= Short-track speed skating at the 1999 Asian Winter Games =

- Venue: Yongpyong Dome
- Dates: 31 January – 1 February 1999
- Competitors: 37 from 6 nations

Short-track speed skating at the 1999 Asian Winter Games took place in the province of Gangwon, South Korea, with ten events contested – five each for men and women.

== Schedule ==
H	Heats	Q	Quarterfinals	S	Semifinals	F	Finals

Event↓/Date →	31st Sun				1st Mon			
Men's 500 m	H	Q	S	F				
Men's 1000 m					H	Q	S	F
Men's 1500 m	H		F					
Men's 3000 m					H		F	
Men's 5000 m relay					F			
Women's 500 m	H	Q	S	F				
Women's 1000 m					H	Q	S	F
Women's 1500 m	H		F					
Women's 3000 m					H		F	
Women's 3000 m relay					F			

== Medalists ==
=== Men ===
Event	Gold	Silver	Bronze
500 m	Lee Jun-hwan; South Korea	Feng Kai; China	Satoru Terao; Japan
1000 m	Feng Kai; China	Kim Dong-sung; South Korea	Hideto Imai; Japan
1500 m	Kim Dong-sung; South Korea	Feng Kai; China	Lee Jun-hwan; South Korea
3000 m	Kim Dong-sung; South Korea	Lee Jun-hwan; South Korea	Yuan Ye; China
5000 m relay	China; Li Jiajun; Feng Kai; An Yulong; Yuan Ye	Japan; Takehiro Kodera; Satoru Terao; Hideto Imai; Hitoshi Uematsu	South Korea; Kim Dong-sung; Lee Jun-hwan; Lee Ho-eung; Kim Sun-tae

=== Women ===
Event	Gold	Silver	Bronze
500 m	Yang Yang; China	Choi Min-kyung; South Korea	Sun Dandan; China
1000 m	Yang Yang; China	Wang Chunlu; China	Kim Yun-mi; South Korea
1500 m	Kim Yun-mi; South Korea	Yang Yang; China	Yang Yang; China
3000 m	Kim Moon-jung; South Korea	Wang Chunlu; China	Choi Min-kyung; South Korea
3000 m relay	South Korea; Choi Min-kyung; Kim Yun-mi; An Sang-mi; Kim Moon-jung	Japan; Yuka Kamino; Chikage Tanaka; Atsuko Takata; Sayuri Yagi	None awarded

== Medal table ==
Rank	Nation	Gold	Silver	Bronze	Total
1	South Korea (KOR)	6	3	4	13
2	China (CHN)	4	5	3	12
3	Japan (JPN)	0	2	2	4
Totals (3 entries)		10	10	9	29

== Participating nations ==
A total of 37 athletes from 6 nations competed in short-track speed skating at the 1999 Asian Winter Games:

- China (8)
- Chinese Taipei (4)
- Hong Kong (3)
- Japan (10)
- Mongolia (2)
- South Korea (10)
