= Short-track speed skating at the 1999 Asian Winter Games – Men's 3000 metres =

Men's 3000 metres at the 1999 Asian Winter Games
- Venue: Yongpyong Dome
- Dates: 1 February 1999
- Competitors: 12 from 3 nations

Medalists
gold medal	Kim Dong-sung	South Korea
silver medal	Lee Jun-hwan	South Korea
bronze medal	Yuan Ye	China

The men's 3000 metres at the 1999 Asian Winter Games was held on February 1, 1999 at Yongpyong Indoor Ice Rink, South Korea.

== Schedule ==
All times are Korea Standard Time (UTC+09:00)

Date	Time	Event
Monday, 1 February 1999	18:34	Heats
Monday, 1 February 1999	19:08	Final

== Results ==
Legend

- ADV — Advanced
- DSQ — Disqualified

=== Heats ===
- Qualification: 1–4 → Final (Q)

==== Heat 1 ====
Rank	Athlete	Time	Notes
1	Feng Kai (CHN)	5:54.999	Q
2	Yuan Ye (CHN)	5:55.026	Q
3	Lee Jun-hwan (KOR)	5:55.339	Q
4	Satoru Terao (JPN)	5:57.310	Q
5	Takehiro Kodera (JPN)	6:12.040	ADV
—	Lee Seung-jae (KOR)	DSQ	

==== Heat 2 ====
Rank	Athlete	Time	Notes
1	Lee Ho-eung (KOR)	6:22.383	Q
2	An Yulong (CHN)	6:22.855	Q
3	Kim Dong-sung (KOR)	6:22.953	Q
4	Hitoshi Uematsu (JPN)	6:22.985	Q
5	Li Jiajun (CHN)	6:23.033	
6	Hayato Sueyoshi (JPN)	6:23.152	

=== Final ===
Rank	Athlete	Time
1st place, gold medalist(s)	Kim Dong-sung (KOR)	6:12.572
2nd place, silver medalist(s)	Lee Jun-hwan (KOR)	6:12.933
3rd place, bronze medalist(s)	Yuan Ye (CHN)	6:14.309
4	An Yulong (CHN)	6:16.188
5	Lee Ho-eung (KOR)	6:17.527
6	Takehiro Kodera (JPN)	6:18.600
7	Feng Kai (CHN)	6:24.180
8	Hitoshi Uematsu (JPN)	6:31.070
9	Satoru Terao (JPN)	6:36.680
