= Short-track speed skating at the 1999 Asian Winter Games – Men's 1500 metres =

Men's 1500 metres at the 1999 Asian Winter Games
- Venue: Yongpyong Dome
- Dates: 31 January 1999
- Competitors: 14 from 4 nations

Medalists
gold medal	Kim Dong-sung	South Korea
silver medal	Feng Kai	China
bronze medal	Lee Jun-hwan	South Korea

The men's 1500 metres at the 1999 Asian Winter Games was held on January 31, 1999, at Yongpyong Indoor Ice Rink, South Korea.

== Schedule ==
All times are Korea Standard Time (UTC+09:00)

Date	Time	Event
Sunday, 31 January 1999	15:25	Heats
Sunday, 31 January 1999	15:55	Final

== Results ==
Legend

- DSQ — Disqualified

=== Heats ===
- Qualification: 1–2 → Final (Q)

==== Heat 1 ====
Rank	Athlete	Time	Notes
1	Hayato Sueyoshi (JPN)	2:24.140	Q
2	Lee Seung-jae (KOR)	2:24.224	Q
3	Hitoshi Uematsu (JPN)	2:24.991	
4	Chang Yung-tai (TPE)	2:33.750	
—	Li Jiajun (CHN)	DSQ	

==== Heat 2 ====
Rank	Athlete	Time	Notes
1	An Yulong (CHN)	2:25.594	Q
2	Lee Jun-hwan (KOR)	2:25.602	Q
3	Satoru Terao (JPN)	2:25.722	
4	Lee Ho-eung (KOR)	2:26.536	

==== Heat 3 ====
Rank	Athlete	Time	Notes
1	Kim Dong-sung (KOR)	2:26.202	Q
2	Feng Kai (CHN)	2:26.331	Q
3	Takehiro Kodera (JPN)	2:27.201	
4	Lin Kuan-hsun (TPE)	2:42.330	
—	Yuan Ye (CHN)	DSQ	

=== Final ===
Rank	Athlete	Time
1st place, gold medalist(s)	Kim Dong-sung (KOR)	2:11.372
2nd place, silver medalist(s)	Feng Kai (CHN)	2:12.137
3rd place, bronze medalist(s)	Lee Jun-hwan (KOR)	2:12.287
4	Hayato Sueyoshi (JPN)	2:12.316
5	An Yulong (CHN)	2:13.693
6	Lee Seung-jae (KOR)	2:30.770
