= 2001–02 ISU Short Track Speed Skating World Cup =

The 2002 Short Track Speed Skating World Cup was a multi-race tournament over a season for short track speed skating. The season began on 21 September and ended on 16 December 2001. The World Cup was organised by the ISU.

== Men ==
=== Events ===
Date	Place	Discipline	Winner	2nd place	3rd place
21-23 September 2001	(China) Changchun	500 m	(China) Li Jiajun	(Japan) Takafumi Nishitani	(Italy) Maurizio Carnino
21-23 September 2001	(China) Changchun	1000 m	(South Korea) Kim Dong-Sung	(South Korea) Min Ryoung	(China) Li Jiajun
21-23 September 2001	(China) Changchun	1500 m	(South Korea) Kim Dong-Sung	(South Korea) Lee Seung-Jae	(China) Li Jiajun
21-23 September 2001	(China) Changchun	3000 m	(South Korea) Min Ryoung	(South Korea) Kim Dong-Sung	(Italy) Fabio Carta
21-23 September 2001	(China) Changchun	5000 m relay	South Korea	Japan	Italy
28-30 September 2001	(Japan) Nobeyama	500 m	(China) Li Jiajun	(Japan) Takafumi Nishitani	(South Korea) Kim Dong-Sung
28-30 September 2001	(Japan) Nobeyama	1000 m	(China) Li Jiajun	(South Korea) Kim Dong-Sung	(China) An Yulong
28-30 September 2001	(Japan) Nobeyama	1500 m	(South Korea) Lee Seung-Jae	(South Korea) Kim Dong-Sung	(China) Li Jiajun
28-30 September 2001	(Japan) Nobeyama	3000 m	(South Korea) Kim Dong-Sung	(China) Li Jiajun	(France) Bruno Loscos
28-30 September 2001	(Japan) Nobeyama	5000 m relay	South Korea	China	Japan
18-20 October 2001	(Canada) Calgary	500 m	(South Korea) Kim Dong-Sung	(Japan) Satoru Terao	(Canada) Éric Bédard
18-20 October 2001	(Canada) Calgary	1000 m	(United States) Apolo Anton Ohno	(South Korea) Kim Dong-Sung	(South Korea) Lee Seung-Jae
18-20 October 2001	(Canada) Calgary	1500 m	(South Korea) Kim Dong-Sung	(Canada) Marc Gagnon	(Italy) Nicola Rodigari
18-20 October 2001	(Canada) Calgary	3000 m	(South Korea) Kim Dong-Sung	(United States) Apolo Anton Ohno	(Italy) Nicola Rodigari
18-20 October 2001	(Canada) Calgary	5000 m relay	Japan	Canada	
7-9 December 2001	(Bulgaria) Sofia	500 m	(South Korea) Kim Dong-Sung	(Canada) Mathieu Turcotte	(Canada) François-Louis Tremblay
7-9 December 2001	(Bulgaria) Sofia	1000 m	(South Korea) Kim Dong-Sung	(South Korea) Min Ryoung	(South Korea) Lee Seung-Jae
7-9 December 2001	(Bulgaria) Sofia	1500 m	(South Korea) Kim Dong-Sung	(Italy) Fabio Carta	(Italy) Nicola Rodigari
7-9 December 2001	(Bulgaria) Sofia	3000 m	(South Korea) Lee Seung-Jae	(South Korea) Kim Dong-Sung	(Italy) Fabio Carta
7-9 December 2001	(Bulgaria) Sofia	5000 m relay	Canada	Italy	China
14-16 December 2001	(Netherlands) Amsterdam	500 m	(Canada) Éric Bédard	(China) Li Jiajun	
14-16 December 2001	(Netherlands) Amsterdam	1000 m	(Japan) Naoya Tamura	(South Korea) Lee Seung-Jae	
14-16 December 2001	(Netherlands) Amsterdam	1500 m	(South Korea) Kim Dong-Sung	(Italy) Fabio Carta	(Canada) Éric Bédard
14-16 December 2001	(Netherlands) Amsterdam	3000 m	(Italy) Nicola Rodigari	(South Korea) Lee Seung-Jae	(South Korea) Kim Dong-Sung
14-16 December 2001	(Netherlands) Amsterdam	5000 m relay	South Korea	Italy	China
11–13 January 2002 European Championships in Grenoble, France
13–23 February 2002 Winter Olympics in Salt Lake City, United States
29–31 March 2002 World Team Championships in Milwaukee, United States
5–7 April 2002 World Championships in Montreal, Canada

=== World Cup Rankings ===
Overall

Rank	Name	Points
1	(South Korea) Kim Dong-Sung	99
2	(South Korea) Lee Seung-Jae	92
3	(China) Li Jiajun	90
4	(South Korea) Min Ryoung	82
5	(Italy) Fabio Carta	78
6	(Japan) Satoru Terao	75
7	(China) Feng Kai	73
8	(China) An Yulong	65
9	(Netherlands) Cees Juffermans	62
10	(Japan) Takafumi Nishitani	61

500 m

Rank	Name	Points
1	(China) Li Jiajun	95
2	(South Korea) Kim Dong-Sung	95
3	(Japan) Takafumi Nishitani	89
4	(South Korea) Min Ryoung	72
5	(Canada) Mathieu Turcotte	69
6	(Japan) Satoru Terao	68
7	(Italy) Fabio Carta	61
8	(South Korea) Lee Seung-Jae	61
9	(China) An Yulong	60
10	(China) Feng Kai	53

1000 m

Rank	Name	Points
1	(South Korea) Kim Dong-Sung	98
2	(South Korea) Min Ryoung	92
3	(South Korea) Lee Seung-Jae	92
4	(China) Li Jiajun	91
5	(China) An Yulong	68
6	(China) Feng Kai	68
7	(Italy) Nicola Rodigari	67
8	(Japan) Satoru Terao	66
9	(Italy) Fabio Carta	63
10	(Canada) Mathieu Turcotte	57

1500 m

Rank	Name	Points
1	(South Korea) Kim Dong-Sung	100
2	(South Korea) Lee Seung-Jae	91
3	(China) Li Jiajun	87
4	(Italy) Fabio Carta	82
5	(China) Feng Kai	76
6	(South Korea) Min Ryoung	76
7	(Netherlands) Cees Juffermans	60
8	(China) An Yulong	59
9	(France) Bruno Loscos	57
10	(Canada) Jonathan Guilmette	56

5000 m relay

Rank	Name	Points
1	South Korea	98
2	Japan	93
3	China	92
4	Italy	91
5	(United Kingdom) Great Britain	79
6	Belgium	79
7	Netherlands	76
8	Russia	66
9	France	63
10	Hungary	54

== Women ==
=== Events ===
Date	Place	Discipline	Winner	2nd place	3rd place
21-23 September 2001	(China) Changchun	500 m	(China) Yang Yang (A)	(Bulgaria) Evgenia Radanova	(China) Yang Yang (S)
21-23 September 2001	(China) Changchun	1000 m	(South Korea) Ko Gi-Hyun	(Bulgaria) Evgenia Radanova	(China) Yang Yang (A)
21-23 September 2001	(China) Changchun	1500 m	(South Korea) Ko Gi-Hyun	(South Korea) Choi Eun-Kyung	(Bulgaria) Evgenia Radanova
21-23 September 2001	(China) Changchun	3000 m	(South Korea) Choi Eun-Kyung	(China) Yang Yang (A)	(South Korea) Ko Gi-Hyun
21-23 September 2001	(China) Changchun	5000 m relay	Japan	Bulgaria	China
28-30 September 2001	(Japan) Nobeyama	500 m	(South Korea) Joo Min-Jin	(Bulgaria) Evgenia Radanova	(South Korea) Choi Min-Kyung
28-30 September 2001	(Japan) Nobeyama	1000 m	(South Korea) Ko Gi-Hyun	(South Korea) Choi Min-Kyung	(Bulgaria) Evgenia Radanova
28-30 September 2001	(Japan) Nobeyama	1500 m	(South Korea) Ko Gi-Hyun	(South Korea) Joo Min-Jin	(China) Yang Yang (A)
28-30 September 2001	(Japan) Nobeyama	3000 m	(South Korea) Ko Gi-Hyun	(South Korea) Joo Min-Jin	(Japan) Chikage Tanaka
28-30 September 2001	(Japan) Nobeyama	5000 m relay	South Korea	Japan	Bulgaria
18-20 October 2001	(Canada) Calgary	500 m	(Bulgaria) Evgenia Radanova	(China) Yang Yang (S)	(Japan) Chikage Tanaka
18-20 October 2001	(Canada) Calgary	1000 m	(China) Yang Yang (A)	(South Korea) Ko Gi-Hyun	(China) Sun Dandan
18-20 October 2001	(Canada) Calgary	1500 m	(China) Yang Yang (A)	(Bulgaria) Evgenia Radanova	(Japan) Chikage Tanaka
18-20 October 2001	(Canada) Calgary	3000 m	(South Korea) Ko Gi-Hyun	(China) Yang Yang (A)	(Japan) Chikage Tanaka
18-20 October 2001	(Canada) Calgary	5000 m relay	South Korea	China	Italy
7-9 December 2001	(Bulgaria) Sofia	500 m	(China) Yang Yang (A)	(China) Yang Yang (S)	(China) Wang Chunlu
7-9 December 2001	(Bulgaria) Sofia	1000 m	(South Korea) Choi Eun-Kyung	(China) Yang Yang (A)	(South Korea) Park Hye-won
7-9 December 2001	(Bulgaria) Sofia	1500 m	(China) Yang Yang (A)	(South Korea) Park Hye-won	(South Korea) Joo Min-Jin
7-9 December 2001	(Bulgaria) Sofia	3000 m	(South Korea) Choi Eun-Kyung	(China) Yang Yang (S)	(United Kingdom) Joanna Williams
7-9 December 2001	(Bulgaria) Sofia	5000 m relay	China	Canada	South Korea
14-16 December 2001	(Netherlands) Amsterdam	500 m	(China) Yang Yang (S)	(China) Yang Yang (A)	(China) Wang Chunlu
14-16 December 2001	(Netherlands) Amsterdam	1000 m	(China) Yang Yang (S)	(China) Yang Yang (A)	(South Korea) Choi Eun-Kyung
14-16 December 2001	(Netherlands) Amsterdam	1500 m	(China) Yang Yang (A)	(South Korea) Choi Eun-Kyung	(Bulgaria) Evgenia Radanova
14-16 December 2001	(Netherlands) Amsterdam	3000 m	(South Korea) Park Hye-won	(China) Yang Yang (A)	(South Korea) Choi Eun-Kyung
14-16 December 2001	(Netherlands) Amsterdam	5000 m relay	China	South Korea	Canada
11–13 January 2002 European Championships in Grenoble, France
13–23 February 2002 Winter Olympics in Salt Lake City, United States
29–31 March 2002 World Team Championships in Milwaukee, United States
5–7 April 2002 World Championships in Montreal, Canada

=== World Cup Rankings ===
Overall

Rank	Name	Points
1	(China) Yang Yang (A)	99
2	(Bulgaria) Evgenia Radanova	88
3	(China) Yang Yang (S)	87
4	(South Korea) Joo Min-Jin	87
5	(Japan) Chikage Tanaka	80
6	(South Korea) Ko Gi-Hyun	73
7	(South Korea) Choi Eun-Kyung	70
8	(United Kingdom) Joanna Williams	62
9	(Italy) Mara Zini	62
10	(United Kingdom) Sarah Lindsay	62

500 m

Rank	Name	Points
1	(China) Yang Yang (S)	96
2	(China) Yang Yang (A)	95
3	(Bulgaria) Evgenia Radanova	90
4	(South Korea) Joo Min-Jin	90
5	(China) Wang Chunlu	90
6	(Japan) Chikage Tanaka	83
7	(Italy) Marta Capurso	62
8	(United Kingdom) Sarah Lindsay	58
9	(South Korea) Choi Min-Kyung	55
10	(South Korea) Choi Eun-Kyung	48

1000 m

Rank	Name	Points
1	(China) Yang Yang (A)	96
2	(China) Yang Yang (S)	86
3	(China) Sun Dandan	85
4	(Bulgaria) Evgenia Radanova	83
5	(South Korea) Joo Min-Jin	81
6	(Japan) Chikage Tanaka	76
7	(South Korea) Ko Gi-Hyun	74
8	(South Korea) Choi Eun-Kyung	69
9	(Japan) Yuka Kamino	60
10	(Russia) Nina Evteeva	58

1500 m

Rank	Name	Points
1	(China) Yang Yang (A)	98
2	(Bulgaria) Evgenia Radanova	90
3	(South Korea) Joo Min-Jin	89
4	(Japan) Chikage Tanaka	83
5	(China) Sun Dandan	83
6	(South Korea) Ko Gi-Hyun	70
7	(United Kingdom) Joanna Williams	64
8	(China) Yang Yang (S)	63
9	(Italy) Mara Zini	57
10	(United Kingdom) Sarah Lindsay	54

5000 m relay

Rank	Name	Points
1	China	100
2	South Korea	97
3	Japan	89
4	Italy	86
5	Bulgaria	84
6	Russia	80
7	Netherlands	77
8	Canada	69
9	Germany	55
10	United States	19

== Podium summary ==
Rank	Nation	Gold	Silver	Bronze	Total
1	South Korea (KOR)	29	18	11	58
2	China (CHN)	13	13	13	39
3	Japan (JPN)	3	5	6	14
4	Canada (CAN)	2	4	4	10
5	Bulgaria (BUL)	1	5	4	10
6	Italy (ITA)	1	4	7	12
7	United States (USA)	1	1	0	2
8	France (FRA)	0	0	1	1
8	Great Britain (GBR)	0	0	1	1
Totals (9 entries)		50	50	47	147
