= Short-track speed skating at the 1999 Asian Winter Games – Men's 500 metres =

Men's 500 metres at the 1999 Asian Winter Games
- Venue: Yongpyong Dome
- Dates: 31 January 1999
- Competitors: 17 from 6 nations

Medalists
gold medal	Lee Jun-hwan	South Korea
silver medal	Feng Kai	China
bronze medal	Satoru Terao	Japan

The men's 500 metres at the 1999 Asian Winter Games was held on January 31, 1999 at the Yongpyong Indoor Ice Rink, South Korea.

== Schedule ==
All times are Korea Standard Time (UTC+09:00)

Date	Time	Event
Sunday, 31 January 1999	17:05	Heats
Sunday, 31 January 1999	17:49	Quarterfinals
Sunday, 31 January 1999	18:14	Semifinals
Sunday, 31 January 1999	18:33	Finals

== Results ==
Legend

- DSQ — Disqualified

=== Heats ===
- Qualification: 1–2 + Two best 3 → Quarterfinals (Q + q)

==== Heat 1 ====
Rank	Athlete	Time	Notes
1	Hideto Imai (JPN)	44.679	Q
2	Lee Seung-jae (KOR)	44.906	Q
3	Lu Shuo (HKG)	1:12.710	
—	Boldyn Sansarbileg (MGL)	DSQ	

==== Heat 2 ====
Rank	Athlete	Time	Notes
1	Satoru Terao (JPN)	42.967	Q
2	Lee Jun-hwan (KOR)	43.154	Q
3	An Yulong (CHN)	43.367	q

==== Heat 3 ====
Rank	Athlete	Time	Notes
1	Kim Dong-sung (KOR)	43.552	Q
2	Yuan Ye (CHN)	43.590	Q
3	Hitoshi Uematsu (JPN)	43.818	q
4	Batchuluuny Bat-Orgil (MGL)	49.077	

==== Heat 4 ====
Rank	Athlete	Time	Notes
1	Li Jiajun (CHN)	44.388	Q
2	Kim Sun-tae (KOR)	44.480	Q
3	Lin Kuan-hsun (TPE)	49.677	

==== Heat 5 ====
Rank	Athlete	Time	Notes
1	Takehiro Kodera (JPN)	45.168	Q
2	Feng Kai (CHN)	45.285	Q
3	Chang Yung-tai (TPE)	48.822	

=== Quarterfinals ===
- Qualification: 1–2 + Two best 3 → Semifinals (Q + q)

==== Heat 1 ====
Rank	Athlete	Time	Notes
1	Satoru Terao (JPN)	43.114	Q
2	An Yulong (CHN)	43.194	Q
3	Kim Sun-tae (KOR)	43.349	q
4	Takehiro Kodera (JPN)	43.553	

==== Heat 2 ====
Rank	Athlete	Time	Notes
1	Feng Kai (CHN)	43.850	Q
2	Lee Jun-hwan (KOR)	43.902	Q
3	Hideto Imai (JPN)	44.017	q
4	Yuan Ye (CHN)	1:03.310	

==== Heat 3 ====
Rank	Athlete	Time	Notes
1	Li Jiajun (CHN)	43.110	Q
2	Kim Dong-sung (KOR)	43.280	Q
3	Lee Seung-jae (KOR)	46.366	
4	Hitoshi Uematsu (JPN)	1:35.080	

=== Semifinals ===
- Qualification: 1–2 → Final A (QA), 3–4 → Final B (QB)

==== Heat 1 ====
Rank	Athlete	Time	Notes
1	Kim Sun-tae (KOR)	43.805	QA
2	Feng Kai (CHN)	1:01.150	QA
—	Kim Dong-sung (KOR)	DSQ	
—	An Yulong (CHN)	DSQ	

==== Heat 2 ====
Rank	Athlete	Time	Notes
1	Satoru Terao (JPN)	42.800	QA
2	Lee Jun-hwan (KOR)	42.949	QA
3	Hideto Imai (JPN)	43.168	QB
—	Li Jiajun (CHN)	DSQ	

=== Finals ===
==== Final B ====
Rank	Athlete	Time
1	Hideto Imai (JPN)	43.609

==== Final A ====
Rank	Athlete	Time
1st place, gold medalist(s)	Lee Jun-hwan (KOR)	45.542
2nd place, silver medalist(s)	Feng Kai (CHN)	52.271
3rd place, bronze medalist(s)	Satoru Terao (JPN)	1:20.960
—	Kim Sun-tae (KOR)	DSQ
