= Short-track speed skating at the 1999 Asian Winter Games – Men's 5000 metre relay =

Men's 5000 metre relay at the 1999 Asian Winter Games
- Venue: Yongpyong Dome
- Dates: 1 February 1999
- Competitors: 12 from 3 nations

Medalists
gold medal	China; Li Jiajun, Feng Kai, An Yulong, Yuan Ye
silver medal	Japan; Takehiro Kodera, Satoru Terao, Hideto Imai, Hitoshi Uematsu
bronze medal	South Korea; Kim Dong-sung, Lee Jun-hwan, Lee Ho-eung, Kim Sun-tae

The men's 5000 metre relay at the 1999 Asian Winter Games was held on February 1, 1999 at the Yongpyong Indoor Ice Rink, South Korea.

== Schedule ==
All times are Korea Standard Time (UTC+09:00)

Date	Time	Event
Monday, 1 February 1999	20:08	Final

== Results ==
Rank	Team	Time
1st place, gold medalist(s)	China (CHN); Li Jiajun; Feng Kai; An Yulong; Yuan Ye	7:29.960
2nd place, silver medalist(s)	Japan (JPN); Takehiro Kodera; Satoru Terao; Hideto Imai; Hitoshi Uematsu	7:30.672
3rd place, bronze medalist(s)	South Korea (KOR); Kim Dong-sung; Lee Jun-hwan; Lee Ho-eung; Kim Sun-tae	7:30.845
