= Short-track speed skating at the 1999 Asian Winter Games – Men's 1000 metres =

Men's 1000 metres at the 1999 Asian Winter Games
- Venue: Yongpyong Dome
- Dates: 1 February 1999
- Competitors: 17 from 6 nations

Medalists
| gold medal | Feng Kai | China |
| silver medal | Kim Dong-sung | South Korea |
| bronze medal | Hideto Imai | Japan |

The men's 1000 metres at the 1999 Asian Winter Games was held on February 1, 1999, at the Yongpyong Indoor Ice Rink, South Korea.

== Schedule ==
All times are Korea Standard Time (UTC+09:00)

| Date | Time | Event |
|---|---|---|
| Monday, 1 February 1999 | 15:30 | Heats |
| Monday, 1 February 1999 | 16:22 | Quarterfinals |
| Monday, 1 February 1999 | 16:52 | Semifinals |
| Monday, 1 February 1999 | 17:14 | Finals |

== Results ==
Legend

- DNS — Did not start
- DSQ — Disqualified

=== Heats ===
- Qualification: 1–2 + Two best 3 → Quarterfinals (Q + q)

==== Heat 1 ====
| Rank | Athlete | Time | Notes |
|---|---|---|---|
| 1 | Li Jiajun (CHN) | 1:38.386 | Q |
| 2 | Hideto Imai (JPN) | 1:38.535 | Q |
| 3 | Batchuluuny Bat-Orgil (MGL) | 1:42.397 | q |
| 4 | Chang Yung-tai (TPE) | 1:42.636 | |

==== Heat 2 ====
| Rank | Athlete | Time | Notes |
|---|---|---|---|
| 1 | Yuan Ye (CHN) | 1:39.001 | Q |
| 2 | Hitoshi Uematsu (JPN) | 1:39.110 | Q |
| 3 | Lee Seung-jae (KOR) | 1:39.191 | q |

==== Heat 3 ====
| Rank | Athlete | Time | Notes |
|---|---|---|---|
| 1 | Kim Dong-sung (KOR) | 1:38.396 | Q |
| 2 | Takehiro Kodera (JPN) | 1:38.579 | Q |
| 3 | Lin Kuan-hsun (TPE) | 2:05.030 | |

==== Heat 4 ====
| Rank | Athlete | Time | Notes |
|---|---|---|---|
| 1 | Satoru Terao (JPN) | 1:42.440 | Q |
| 2 | An Yulong (CHN) | 1:47.778 | Q |
| — | Lee Jun-hwan (KOR) | DSQ | |

==== Heat 5 ====
| Rank | Athlete | Time | Notes |
|---|---|---|---|
| 1 | Kim Sun-tae (KOR) | 1:41.812 | Q |
| 2 | Feng Kai (CHN) | 1:42.035 | Q |
| 3 | Boldyn Sansarbileg (MGL) | 1:43.897 | |
| — | Lu Shuo (HKG) | DNS | |

=== Quarterfinals ===
- Qualification: 1–2 + Two best 3 → Semifinals (Q + q)

==== Heat 1 ====
| Rank | Athlete | Time | Notes |
|---|---|---|---|
| 1 | Feng Kai (CHN) | 1:29.560 | Q |
| 2 | Li Jiajun (CHN) | 1:29.575 | Q |
| 3 | Takehiro Kodera (JPN) | 1:31.528 | |
| 4 | Hitoshi Uematsu (JPN) | 2:07.916 | |

==== Heat 2 ====
| Rank | Athlete | Time | Notes |
|---|---|---|---|
| 1 | Kim Dong-sung (KOR) | 1:27.724 | Q |
| 2 | Satoru Terao (JPN) | 1:27.845 | Q |
| 3 | Hideto Imai (JPN) | 1:29.140 | q |
| 4 | Batchuluuny Bat-Orgil (MGL) | 1:42.477 | |

==== Heat 3 ====
| Rank | Athlete | Time | Notes |
|---|---|---|---|
| 1 | An Yulong (CHN) | 1:28.079 | Q |
| 2 | Yuan Ye (CHN) | 1:28.246 | Q |
| 3 | Kim Sun-tae (KOR) | 1:29.293 | q |
| 4 | Lee Seung-jae (KOR) | 1:30.449 | |

=== Semifinals ===
- Qualification: 1–2 → Final A (QA), 3–4 → Final B (QB)

==== Heat 1 ====
| Rank | Athlete | Time | Notes |
|---|---|---|---|
| 1 | Feng Kai (CHN) | 1:35.828 | QA |
| 2 | An Yulong (CHN) | 1:35.890 | QA |
| 3 | Satoru Terao (JPN) | 1:36.024 | QB |
| 4 | Kim Sun-tae (KOR) | 1:36.759 | QB |

==== Heat 2 ====
| Rank | Athlete | Time | Notes |
|---|---|---|---|
| 1 | Kim Dong-sung (KOR) | 1:35.536 | QA |
| 2 | Hideto Imai (JPN) | 1:35.888 | QA |
| 3 | Li Jiajun (CHN) | 2:24.328 | QB |
| 4 | Yuan Ye (CHN) | 2:49.170 | QB |

=== Finals ===
==== Final B ====
| Rank | Athlete | Time |
|---|---|---|
| 1 | Satoru Terao (JPN) | 1:38.059 |
| 2 | Yuan Ye (CHN) | 1:38.404 |
| 3 | Li Jiajun (CHN) | 1:39.842 |
| 4 | Kim Sun-tae (KOR) | 1:40.257 |

==== Final A ====
| Rank | Athlete | Time |
|---|---|---|
| 1st place, gold medalist(s) | Feng Kai (CHN) | 1:37.194 |
| 2nd place, silver medalist(s) | Kim Dong-sung (KOR) | 1:37.364 |
| 3rd place, bronze medalist(s) | Hideto Imai (JPN) | 1:37.609 |
| — | An Yulong (CHN) | DSQ |
