= Short-track speed skating at the 1999 Asian Winter Games – Women's 1000 metres =

Women's 1000 metres at the 1999 Asian Winter Games
- Venue: Yongpyong Dome
- Dates: 1 February 1999
- Competitors: 16 from 5 nations

Medalists
gold medal	Yang Yang	China
silver medal	Wang Chunlu	China
bronze medal	Kim Yun-mi	South Korea

The women's 1000 metres at the 1999 Asian Winter Games was held on February 1, 1999, at Yongpyong Indoor Ice Rink, South Korea.

== Schedule ==
All times are Korea Standard Time (UTC+09:00)

Date	Time	Event
Monday, 1 February 1999	15:00	Heats
Monday, 1 February 1999	16:00	Quarterfinals
Monday, 1 February 1999	16:44	Semifinals
Monday, 1 February 1999	17:10	Finals

== Results ==
Legend

- DNS — Did not start
- DSQ — Disqualified

=== Heats ===
- Qualification: 1–2 + Two best 3 → Quarterfinals (Q + q)

==== Heat 1 ====
Rank	Athlete	Time	Notes
1	Yang Yang (CHN)	1:54.404	Q
2	Kim Moon-jung (KOR)	1:54.446	Q
3	Chen Ya-wen (TPE)	2:02.404	

==== Heat 2 ====
Rank	Athlete	Time	Notes
1	Wang Chunlu (CHN)	1:46.704	Q
2	Miyuki Ozawa (JPN)	1:46.737	Q
3	Christy Ren (HKG)	2:03.852	

==== Heat 3 ====
Rank	Athlete	Time	Notes
1	Choi Min-kyung (KOR)	1:43.426	Q
2	Sun Dandan (CHN)	1:43.430	Q
3	Atsuko Takata (JPN)	1:43.611	q
4	Hou Hsin-yu (TPE)	1:46.623	

==== Heat 4 ====
Rank	Athlete	Time	Notes
1	Yang Yang (CHN)	1:42.353	Q
2	Kim Yun-mi (KOR)	1:42.429	Q
3	Yuka Kamino (JPN)	1:42.676	q

==== Heat 5 ====
Rank	Athlete	Time	Notes
1	An Sang-mi (KOR)	1:56.512	Q
2	Chikage Tanaka (JPN)	1:56.675	Q
3	Cordia Tsoi (HKG)	2:07.492	

=== Quarterfinals ===
- Qualification: 1–2 + Two best 3 → Semifinals (Q + q)

==== Heat 1 ====
Rank	Athlete	Time	Notes
1	Yang Yang (CHN)	1:32.603	Q
2	Kim Moon-jung (KOR)	1:32.682	Q
3	Choi Min-kyung (KOR)	1:32.993	q
4	Atsuko Takata (JPN)	1:39.542	

==== Heat 2 ====
Rank	Athlete	Time	Notes
1	Yang Yang (CHN)	1:37.018	Q
2	Sun Dandan (CHN)	1:37.120	Q
3	Chikage Tanaka (JPN)	1:38.038	
4	Miyuki Ozawa (JPN)	1:38.259	

==== Heat 3 ====
Rank	Athlete	Time	Notes
1	Kim Yun-mi (KOR)	1:33.139	Q
2	Wang Chunlu (CHN)	1:33.243	Q
3	An Sang-mi (KOR)	1:33.344	q
4	Yuka Kamino (JPN)	1:33.436	

=== Semifinals ===
- Qualification: 1–2 → Final A (QA), 3–4 → Final B (QB)

==== Heat 1 ====
Rank	Athlete	Time	Notes
1	Yang Yang (CHN)	1:34.813	QA
2	Wang Chunlu (CHN)	1:35.045	QA
3	Kim Moon-jung (KOR)	1:35.147	QB
4	Choi Min-kyung (KOR)	1:36.448	QB

==== Heat 2 ====
Rank	Athlete	Time	Notes
1	Yang Yang (CHN)	1:38.549	QA
2	Kim Yun-mi (KOR)	1:38.649	QA
3	Sun Dandan (CHN)	1:38.676	QB
4	An Sang-mi (KOR)	1:44.854	QB

=== Finals ===
==== Final B ====
Rank	Athlete	Time
1	An Sang-mi (KOR)	1:46.560
2	Kim Moon-jung (KOR)	1:53.108
3	Choi Min-kyung (KOR)	1:53.212
4	Sun Dandan (CHN)	1:53.273

==== Final A ====
Rank	Athlete	Time
1st place, gold medalist(s)	Yang Yang (CHN)	1:45.516
2nd place, silver medalist(s)	Wang Chunlu (CHN)	1:45.565
3rd place, bronze medalist(s)	Kim Yun-mi (KOR)	1:45.852
—	Yang Yang (CHN)	DSQ
