= Short-track speed skating at the 1999 Asian Winter Games – Women's 500 metres =

Women's 500 metres at the 1999 Asian Winter Games
- Venue: Yongpyong Dome
- Dates: 31 January 1999
- Competitors: 16 from 5 nations

Medalists
gold medal	Yang Yang	China
silver medal	Choi Min-kyung	South Korea
bronze medal	Sun Dandan	China

The women's 500 metres at the 1999 Asian Winter Games was held on January 31, 1999 at the Yongpyong Indoor Ice Rink, South Korea.

== Schedule ==
All times are Korea Standard Time (UTC+09:00)

Date	Time	Event
Sunday, 31 January 1999	16:40	Heats
Sunday, 31 January 1999	17:30	Quarterfinals
Sunday, 31 January 1999	18:08	Semifinals
Sunday, 31 January 1999	18:30	Finals

== Results ==
Legend

- DSQ — Disqualified

=== Heats ===
- Qualification: 1–2 + Two best 3 → Quarterfinals (Q + q)

==== Heat 1 ====
Rank	Athlete	Time	Notes
1	Yang Yang (CHN)	45.833	Q
2	Kim Yun-mi (KOR)	45.910	Q
3	Atsuko Takata (JPN)	47.760	q
4	Christy Ren (HKG)	58.390	

==== Heat 2 ====
Rank	Athlete	Time	Notes
1	Wang Chunlu (CHN)	46.179	Q
2	An Sang-mi (KOR)	46.294	Q
3	Chen Ya-wen (TPE)	1:02.660	

==== Heat 3 ====
Rank	Athlete	Time	Notes
1	Choi Min-kyung (KOR)	51.190	Q
2	Sayuri Yagi (JPN)	51.338	Q
3	Cordia Tsoi (HKG)	58.653	

==== Heat 4 ====
Rank	Athlete	Time	Notes
1	Yang Yang (CHN)	46.343	Q
2	Yuka Kamino (JPN)	46.571	Q
3	Kim Moon-jung (KOR)	46.584	q

==== Heat 5 ====
Rank	Athlete	Time	Notes
1	Sun Dandan (CHN)	47.285	Q
2	Chikage Tanaka (JPN)	47.524	Q
3	Hou Hsin-yu (TPE)	53.904	

=== Quarterfinals ===
- Qualification: 1–2 + Two best 3 → Semifinals (Q + q)

==== Heat 1 ====
Rank	Athlete	Time	Notes
1	Yang Yang (CHN)	46.027	Q
2	Chikage Tanaka (JPN)	46.108	Q
3	An Sang-mi (KOR)	46.123	q
4	Sayuri Yagi (JPN)	48.196	

==== Heat 2 ====
Rank	Athlete	Time	Notes
1	Yang Yang (CHN)	46.186	Q
2	Choi Min-kyung (KOR)	46.356	Q
3	Kim Yun-mi (KOR)	46.627	
4	Atsuko Takata (JPN)	47.531	

==== Heat 3 ====
Rank	Athlete	Time	Notes
1	Wang Chunlu (CHN)	45.831	Q
2	Sun Dandan (CHN)	45.865	Q
3	Yuka Kamino (JPN)	46.078	q
4	Kim Moon-jung (KOR)	46.752	

=== Semifinals ===
- Qualification: 1–2 → Final A (QA), 3–4 → Final B (QB)

==== Heat 1 ====
Rank	Athlete	Time	Notes
1	Choi Min-kyung (KOR)	45.501	QA
2	An Sang-mi (KOR)	45.748	QA
—	Wang Chunlu (CHN)	DSQ	
—	Yang Yang (CHN)	DSQ	

==== Heat 2 ====
Rank	Athlete	Time	Notes
1	Sun Dandan (CHN)	46.189	QA
2	Yang Yang (CHN)	46.191	QA
3	Chikage Tanaka (JPN)	46.402	QB
4	Yuka Kamino (JPN)	46.457	QB

=== Finals ===
==== Final B ====
Rank	Athlete	Time
1	Yuka Kamino (JPN)	46.466
2	Chikage Tanaka (JPN)	46.482

==== Final A ====
Rank	Athlete	Time
1st place, gold medalist(s)	Yang Yang (CHN)	45.490
2nd place, silver medalist(s)	Choi Min-kyung (KOR)	45.531
3rd place, bronze medalist(s)	Sun Dandan (CHN)	45.576
4	An Sang-mi (KOR)	47.922
