= Short-track speed skating at the Asian Winter Games =

- Governing bodies: ISU (World) / ASU (Asia)
- Events: 9 (men: 4; women: 4; mixed: 1)

Games
- 1986; 1990; 1996; 1999; 2003; 2007; 2011; 2017; 2025
- Medalists; Records

Short-track speed skating has been featured as a sport in the Asian Winter Games since the first winter games in 1986.

== Editions ==
Games	Year	Host city	Best nation
I	1986	Sapporo, Japan	Japan
II	1990	Sapporo, Japan	China
III	1996	Harbin, China	South Korea
IV	1999	Gangwon, South Korea	South Korea
V	2003	Aomori, Japan	South Korea
VI	2007	Changchun, China	South Korea
VII	2011	Astana–Almaty, Kazakhstan	South Korea
VIII	2017	Sapporo, Japan	South Korea
IX	2025	Harbin, China	South Korea

== Events ==
Event	86	90	96	99	03	07	11	17	25	Years
Men's 500 m	X	X	X	X	X	X	X	X	X	9
Men's 1000 m	X	X	X	X	X	X	X	X	X	9
Men's 1500 m	X	X	X	X	X	X	X	X	X	9
Men's 3000 m	X	X	X	X	X					5
Men's 5000 m relay		X	X	X	X	X	X	X	X	8
Women's 500 m	X	X	X	X	X	X	X	X	X	9
Women's 1000 m	X	X	X	X	X	X	X	X	X	9
Women's 1500 m	X	X	X	X	X	X	X	X	X	9
Women's 3000 m	X	X	X	X	X					5
Women's 3000 m relay		X	X	X	X	X	X	X	X	8
Mixed 2000 m relay									X	1
Total	8	10	10	10	10	8	8	8	9	

== Medal table ==
Rank	Nation	Gold	Silver	Bronze	Total
1	South Korea (KOR)	40	39	30	109
2	China (CHN)	31	21	23	75
3	Japan (JPN)	9	17	21	47
4	Kazakhstan (KAZ)	1	2	3	6
5	North Korea (PRK)	0	2	4	6
Totals (5 entries)		81	81	81	243
