= 1999 World Short Track Speed Skating Team Championships =

Short track team championship

- Location: St. Louis, United States
- Start date: 5 April 1999
- End date: 7 April 1999

The 1999 World Short Track Speed Skating Team Championships is the 9th edition of the World Short Track Speed Skating Team Championships, which took place on 5-7 April 1999 in St. Louis, United States.

All teams were represented by four athletes at 500 m and 1000 m as well as by two athletes at 3000 m. At 500 m and 1000 m, athletes were drafted into the heats of four. At 3000 m, athletes were drafted into two heats. All athletes in each heat were from different countries. The best four team advanced for the relay competition.

== Medal winners ==
Event	Gold	Silver	Bronze
Men	China; Li Jiajun; Feng Kai; An Yulong; Yuan Ye	Canada; Jonathan Guilmette; François-Louis Tremblay; Éric Bédard; Derrick Campbell; Andrew Quinn	Japan; Satoru Terao; Takafumi Nishitani; Hayato Sueyoshi; Takehiro Kodera; Hitoshi Uematsu
Women	China; Wang Chunlu; Yang Yang (A); Yang Yang (S); Sun Dandan; Liu Xiaoying	Canada; Isabelle Charest; Christine Boudrias; Annie Perreault; Tania Vicent; Marie-Ève Drolet	South Korea; Kim Yun-mi; An Sang-mi; Kim Moon-jung; Choi Min-kyung; Kim Yang-hee

== Results ==
=== Men ===
Rank	Nation	Total
1st place, gold medalist(s)	China	49
2nd place, silver medalist(s)	Canada	42
3rd place, bronze medalist(s)	Japan	37
4	United States	31
5	South Korea	25
6	Italy	22

=== Women ===
Rank	Nation	Total
1st place, gold medalist(s)	China	69
2nd place, silver medalist(s)	Canada	35
3rd place, bronze medalist(s)	South Korea	34
4	United States	33
5	Italy	21
6	Japan	20
