= Short-track speed skating at the 1999 Asian Winter Games – Women's 1500 metres =

Women's 1500 metres at the 1999 Asian Winter Games
- Venue: Yongpyong Dome
- Dates: 31 January 1999
- Competitors: 14 from 4 nations

Medalists
gold medal	Kim Yun-mi	South Korea
silver medal	Yang Yang	China
bronze medal	Yang Yang	China

The women's 1500 metres at the 1999 Asian Winter Games was held on January 31, 1999 at Yongpyong Indoor Ice Rink, South Korea.

== Schedule ==
All times are Korea Standard Time (UTC+09:00)

Date	Time	Event
Sunday, 31 January 1999	15:00	Heats
Sunday, 31 January 1999	15:50	Final

== Results ==
Legend

- DSQ — Disqualified

=== Heats ===
- Qualification: 1–2 → Final (Q)

==== Heat 1 ====
Rank	Athlete	Time	Notes
1	Yang Yang (CHN)	2:39.640	Q
2	Choi Min-kyung (KOR)	2:39.776	Q
3	Sayuri Yagi (JPN)	2:41.595	
4	Kim Yang-hee (KOR)	2:41.596	
5	Chen Ya-wen (TPE)	2:58.090	

==== Heat 2 ====
Rank	Athlete	Time	Notes
1	Kim Moon-jung (KOR)	2:30.980	Q
2	Wang Chunlu (CHN)	2:31.230	Q
3	Chikage Tanaka (JPN)	2:31.730	
4	Miyuki Ozawa (JPN)	2:32.560	
5	Hou Hsin-yu (TPE)	2:45.370	

==== Heat 3 ====
Rank	Athlete	Time	Notes
1	Yang Yang (CHN)	2:44.111	Q
2	Kim Yun-mi (KOR)	2:44.129	Q
3	Sun Dandan (CHN)	2:44.230	
4	Yuka Kamino (JPN)	2:44.508	

=== Final ===
Rank	Athlete	Time
1st place, gold medalist(s)	Kim Yun-mi (KOR)	2:28.637
2nd place, silver medalist(s)	Yang Yang (CHN)	2:29.648
3rd place, bronze medalist(s)	Yang Yang (CHN)	2:31.648
4	Wang Chunlu (CHN)	2:33.367
5	Choi Min-kyung (KOR)	2:34.568
—	Kim Moon-jung (KOR)	DSQ
