= Short-track speed skating at the 1999 Asian Winter Games – Women's 3000 metres =

Women's 3000 metres at the 1999 Asian Winter Games
- Venue: Yongpyong Dome
- Dates: 1 February 1999
- Competitors: 12 from 3 nations

Medalists
gold medal	Kim Moon-jung	South Korea
silver medal	Wang Chunlu	China
bronze medal	Choi Min-kyung	South Korea

The women's 3000 metres at the 1999 Asian Winter Games was held on February 1, 1999, at Yongpyong Indoor Ice Rink, South Korea.

== Schedule ==
All times are Korea Standard Time (UTC+09:00)

Date	Time	Event
Monday, 1 February 1999	18:08	Heats
Monday, 1 February 1999	19:00	Final

== Results ==
Legend

- DSQ — Disqualified

=== Heats ===
- Qualification: 1–4 → Final (Q)

==== Heat 1 ====
Rank	Athlete	Time	Notes
1	Yang Yang (CHN)	5:53.938	Q
2	Choi Min-kyung (KOR)	5:54.038	Q
3	Kim Yun-mi (KOR)	6:03.924	Q
4	Yang Yang (CHN)	6:03.928	Q
5	Chikage Tanaka (JPN)	6:04.161	
6	Sayuri Yagi (JPN)	6:05.376	

==== Heat 2 ====
Rank	Athlete	Time	Notes
1	Kim Moon-jung (KOR)	6:07.776	Q
2	Wang Chunlu (CHN)	6:07.888	Q
3	An Sang-mi (KOR)	6:07.954	Q
4	Sun Dandan (CHN)	6:08.040	Q
5	Yuka Kamino (JPN)	6:08.598	
6	Miyuki Ozawa (JPN)	6:08.725	

=== Final ===
Rank	Athlete	Time
1st place, gold medalist(s)	Kim Moon-jung (KOR)	5:04.510
2nd place, silver medalist(s)	Wang Chunlu (CHN)	5:08.608
3rd place, bronze medalist(s)	Choi Min-kyung (KOR)	5:20.750
4	Yang Yang (CHN)	5:21.600
5	An Sang-mi (KOR)	5:22.515
6	Yang Yang (CHN)	5:32.870
—	Kim Yun-mi (KOR)	DSQ
—	Sun Dandan (CHN)	DSQ
