= Short-track speed skating at the 1998 Winter Olympics – Men's 500 metres =

Men's 500 metres at the XVIII Olympic Winter Games
- Pictogram for short track
- Venue: White Ring
- Dates: 19–21 February
- Competitors: 30 from 16 nations
- Winning time: 42.862

Medalists
1st place, gold medalist(s)		Takafumi Nishitani	Japan
2nd place, silver medalist(s)		An Yulong	China
3rd place, bronze medalist(s)		Hitoshi Uematsu	Japan

The men's 500 metres in short track speed skating at the 1998 Winter Olympics took place on 19 and 21 February at the White Ring.

== Results ==
=== Heats ===
The first round was held on 19 February. There were eight heats, with the top two finishers moving on to the quarterfinals.

Heat 1

Rank	Athlete	Country	Time	Notes
1	An Yulong	China	43.748	Q
2	Andy Gabel	United States	43.899	Q
3	Yevhen Yakovlev	Ukraine	44.041	
4	Han Sang-guk	North Korea	44.206	

Heat 2

Rank	Athlete	Country	Time	Notes
1	François Drolet	Canada	43.551	Q
2	Kim Dong-sung	South Korea	43.653	Q
3	Martin Johansson	Sweden	44.003	

Heat 3

Rank	Athlete	Country	Time	Notes
1	Dave Versteeg	Netherlands	44.358	Q
2	Feng Kai	China	44.817	Q
3	Maciej Pryczek	Poland	46.652	
4	Nicky Gooch	Great Britain	68.907	

Heat 4

Rank	Athlete	Country	Time	Notes
1	Li Jiajun	China	43.831	Q
2	Maurizio Carnino	Italy	43.927	Q
3	Rusty Smith	United States	44.584	

Heat 5

Rank	Athlete	Country	Time	Notes
1	Lee Jun-hwan	South Korea	43.840	Q
2	Marc Gagnon	Canada	43.901	Q
3	Arian Nachbar	Germany	44.882	
4	Yun Chol	North Korea	45.014	

Heat 6

Rank	Athlete	Country	Time	Notes
1	Satoru Terao	Japan	42.948	Q OR
2	Chae Ji-hoon	South Korea	43.011	Q
3	Steven Bradbury	Australia	43.766	

Heat 7

Rank	Athlete	Country	Time	Notes
1	Éric Bédard	Canada	43.342	Q
2	Hitoshi Uematsu	Japan	43.428	Q
3	Dan Weinstein	United States	43.492	
4	Ludovic Mathieu	France	43.767	

Heat 8

Rank	Athlete	Country	Time	Notes
1	Fabio Carta	Italy	43.000	Q
2	Takafumi Nishitani	Japan	43.348	Q
3	Bruno Loscos	France	43.725	
4	Battulgyn Oktyabri	Mongolia	50.466	

=== Quarterfinals ===
The top two finishers in each of the four quarterfinals advanced to the semifinals. In quarterfinal 2, American Andy Gabel was advanced, and Canada's François Drolet disqualified.

Quarterfinal 1

Rank	Athlete	Country	Time	Notes
1	Marc Gagnon	Canada	43.254	Q
2	Hitoshi Uematsu	Japan	43.657	Q
3	Fabio Carta	Italy	43.763	
4	Lee Jun-hwan	South Korea	44.417	

Quarterfinal 2

Rank	Athlete	Country	Time	Notes
1	An Yulong	China	43.384	Q
2	Chae Ji-hoon	South Korea	43.622	Q
3	Andy Gabel	United States	44.124	ADV
–	François Drolet	Canada	DSQ	

Quarterfinal 3

Rank	Athlete	Country	Time	Notes
1	Li Jiajun	China	42.861	Q OR
2	Takafumi Nishitani	Japan	42.980	Q
3	Éric Bédard	Canada	43.113	
4	Maurizio Carnino	Italy	43.225	

Quarterfinal 4

Rank	Athlete	Country	Time	Notes
1	Dave Versteeg	Netherlands	43.377	Q
2	Kim Dong-sung	South Korea	43.810	Q
3	Feng Kai	China	44.384	
4	Satoru Terao	Japan	65.470	

=== Semifinals ===
The top two finishers in each of the two semifinals qualified for the A final, while the third and fourth place skaters advanced to the B Final.

Semifinal 1

Rank	Athlete	Country	Time	Notes
1	Hitoshi Uematsu	Japan	43.697	QA
2	An Yulong	China	43.796	QA
3	Dave Versteeg	Netherlands	43.850	QB
4	Chae Ji-hoon	South Korea	43.864	QB

Semifinal 2

Rank	Athlete	Country	Time	Notes
1	Takafumi Nishitani	Japan	42.756	QA OR
2	Marc Gagnon	Canada	42.780	QA
3	Kim Dong-sung	South Korea	43.096	QB
4	Andy Gabel	United States	59.811	QB
–	Li Jiajun	China	DSQ	

=== Finals ===
The four qualifying skaters competed in Final A, while four others raced for 5th place in Final B.

Final A

Rank	Athlete	Country	Time	Notes
1st place, gold medalist(s)	Takafumi Nishitani	Japan	42.862	
2nd place, silver medalist(s)	An Yulong	China	43.022	
3rd place, bronze medalist(s)	Hitoshi Uematsu	Japan	43.713	
4	Marc Gagnon	Canada	75.600	

Final B

Rank	Athlete	Country	Time	Notes
5	Chae Ji-hoon	South Korea	42.832	
6	Dave Versteeg	Netherlands	42.933	
7	Andy Gabel	United States	43.072	
8	Kim Dong-sung	South Korea	43.090	
