= China at the 2002 Winter Olympics =

- IOC code: CHN
- NOC: Chinese Olympic Committee
- Website: www.olympic.cn (in Chinese and English)

in Salt Lake City
- Competitors: 66 (21 men, 45 women) in 7 sports
- Flag bearer: Zhang Min (figure skating)
- Medals Ranked 13th: Gold 2 Silver 2 Bronze 4 Total 8

Winter Olympics appearances (overview)
- 1980; 1984; 1988; 1992; 1994; 1998; 2002; 2006; 2010; 2014; 2018; 2022; 2026

The People's Republic of China competed at the 2002 Winter Olympics in Salt Lake City, United States. The team excludes athletes from the Special Administrative Region of Hong Kong, which competed separately as Hong Kong, China. China won its first Winter Olympic gold medal at these Games. It had previously won silver and bronze medals at prior Games.

== Medalists ==
Medal	Name	Sport	Event
Gold	Yang Yang (A)	Short Track Speed Skating	Women's 500m
Gold	Yang Yang (A)	Short Track Speed Skating	Women's 1000m
Silver	Li Jiajun	Short Track Speed Skating	Men's 1500m
Silver	Yang Yang (A); Yang Yang (S); Wang Chunlu; Sun Dandan	Short Track Speed Skating	Women's 3000m Relay
Bronze	Shen Xue; Zhao Hongbo	Figure Skating	Pairs
Bronze	Yang Yang (S)	Short Track Speed Skating	Women's 1000m
Bronze	Wang Chunlu	Short Track Speed Skating	Women's 500m
Bronze	Li Jiajun; An Yulong; Li Ye; Feng Kai; Guo Wei	Short Track Speed Skating	Men's 5000m Relay

== Biathlon ==
Men

Event	Athlete	Misses ^{1}	Time	Rank
10 km sprint	Zhang Qing	3	27:45.3	56
12.5 km pursuit ^{2}	Zhang Qing	5	39:11.1	53

Event	Athlete	Time	Misses	Adjusted time ^{3}	Rank
20 km	Zhang Qing	54:13.9	4	58:13.9	59

Women

Event	Athlete	Misses ^{1}	Time	Rank
7.5 km sprint	Sun Ribo	3	24:32.4	57
7.5 km sprint	Kong Yingchao	3	24:30.2	56
7.5 km sprint	Liu Xianying	1	23:18.9	42
7.5 km sprint	Yu Shumei	1	22:29.9	20
10 km pursuit ^{4}	Yu Shumei	6	37:02.6	44

Event	Athlete	Time	Misses	Adjusted time ^{3}	Rank
15 km	Yu Shumei	48:43.0	5	53:43.0	46
15 km	Kong Yingchao	51:38.0	2	53:38.0	44
15 km	Liu Xianying	50:09.4	0	50:09.4	17
15 km	Sun Ribo	49:04.7	1	50:04.7	15

Women's 4 × 7.5 km relay

Athletes	Race		
Athletes	Misses ^{1}	Time	Rank
Yu Shumei; Sun Ribo; Liu Xianying; Kong Yingchao	0	1'34:45.6	13

^{1} A penalty loop of 150 metres had to be skied per missed target.
^{2} Starting delay based on 10 km sprint results.
^{3} One minute added per missed target.
^{4} Starting delay based on 7.5 km sprint results.

== Cross-country skiing ==
Men

Sprint

Athlete	Qualifying round		Quarterfinals		Semifinals		Finals	
Athlete	Time	Rank	Time	Rank	Time	Rank	Time	Final rank
Han Dawei	3:07.00	52	did not advance					

Pursuit

Athlete	10 km C		10 km F pursuit^{1}	
Athlete	Time	Rank	Time	Final rank
Han Dawei	30:15.7	67	did not advance	

Event	Athlete	Race	
Event	Athlete	Time	Rank
15 km C	Han Dawei	42:34.5	56
30 km F	Han Dawei	1'25:42.4	65
50 km C	Han Dawei	2'44:50.0	54

^{1} Starting delay based on 10 km C. results.
C = Classical style, F = Freestyle

Women

Sprint

Athlete	Qualifying round		Quarterfinals		Semifinals		Finals	
Athlete	Time	Rank	Time	Rank	Time	Rank	Time	Final rank
Luan Zhengrong	3:35.21	50	did not advance					
Hou Yuxia	3:28.71	40	did not advance					

Pursuit

Athlete	5 km C		5 km F pursuit^{2}	
Athlete	Time	Rank	Time	Final rank
Luan Zhengrong	15:40.6	65	did not advance	
Hou Yuxia	14:26.3	46 Q	14:11.1	44

Event	Athlete	Race	
Event	Athlete	Time	Rank
10 km C	Luan Zhengrong	32:35.3	50
10 km C	Hou Yuxia	31:30.6	44
15 km F	Luan Zhengrong	47:43.7	52
15 km F	Hou Yuxia	45:42.2	47
30 km C	Hou Yuxia	1'49:45.8	42
30 km C	Luan Zhengrong	1'49:37.7	41

^{2} Starting delay based on 5 km C. results.
C = Classical style, F = Freestyle

== Figure skating ==
Men

Athlete	Points	SP	FS	Rank
Li Yunfei	30.0	14	23	20
Zhang Min	24.5	19	15	16
Li Chengjiang	12.0	6	9	9

Pairs

Athletes	Points	SP	FS	Rank
Zhang Dan; Zhang Hao	16.5	9	12	11
Pang Qing; Tong Jian	14.0	10	9	9
Shen Xue; Zhao Hongbo	4.5	3	3	3rd place, bronze medalist(s)

Ice Dancing

Athletes	Points	CD1	CD2	OD	FD	Rank
Zhang Weina; Cao Xianming	44.0	23	23	23	21	22

== Freestyle skiing ==
Men

Athlete	Event	Qualification		Final	
Athlete	Event	Points	Rank	Points	Rank
Han Xiaopeng	Aerials	144.91	24	did not advance	
Ou Xiaotao	Aerials	175.01	19	did not advance	
Qiu Sen	Aerials	187.42	18	did not advance	

Women

Athlete	Event	Qualification		Final	
Athlete	Event	Points	Rank	Points	Rank
Guo Xinxin	Aerials	130.31	19	did not advance	
Wang He	Aerials	136.77	18	did not advance	
Xu Nannan	Aerials	160.64	12 Q	135.96	12
Li Nina	Aerials	181.30	4 Q	185.23	5

== Ice hockey ==
=== Women's tournament ===
==== Group stage - Group B ====
Top two teams (shaded) advanced to semifinals.

Team	GP	W	L	T	GF	GA	GD	Pts
United States	3	3	0	0	28	1	+27	6
Finland	3	2	1	0	7	6	+1	4
Germany	3	0	2	1	6	18	−12	1
China	3	0	2	1	6	21	−15	1

All times are local (UTC-7).

12 February 2002; 14:00	Finland	4 – 0 (0–0, 2–0, 2–0)	China	Peaks Ice Arena, Provo; Attendance: 4,977

14 February 2002; 16:00	China	1 – 12 (0–3, 1–5, 0–4)	United States	Peaks Ice Arena, Provo; Attendance: 6,325

16 February 2002; 14:00	Germany	5 – 5 (1–1, 1–4, 3–0)	China	Peaks Ice Arena, Provo; Attendance: 5,418

==== Classification round ====
5th place semifinal

17 February 2002; 14:00	Russia	4 – 1 (0–1, 3–0, 1–0)	China	Peaks Ice Arena, Provo; Attendance: 5,719

7th place match

19 February 2002; 14:00	China 7th	2 – 1 OT (1–0, 0–0, 0–1, 1–0)	Kazakhstan	Peaks Ice Arena, Provo; Attendance: 5,490

Contestants; Chen Jing; Dai Qiuwa; Guan Weinan; Guo Hong; Hu Chunrong; Jin Fengling; Li Xuan; Liu Hongmei; Liu Yanhui; Lu Yan; Ma Xiaojun; Sang Hong; Shen Tiantian; Sun Rui; Wang Linuo; Wang Ying; Xu Lei; Yang Xiuqing; Zhang Jing

== Short track speed skating ==
Men

Athlete	Event	Round one		Quarterfinals		Semifinals		Finals	
Athlete	Event	Time	Rank	Time	Rank	Time	Rank	Time	Final rank
Li Jiajun	500 m	43.690	1 Q	1:04.514	3	did not advance			
Feng Kai	500 m	43.084	1 Q	42.820	2 Q	42.266	2 Q	42.112	4
Feng Kai	1000 m	1:32.554	1 Q	1:28.424	3	did not advance			
Li Jiajun	1000 m	1:30.447	2 Q	1:27.467	2 Q	1:30.592	2 Q	DSQ	–
Li Jiajun	1500 m	2:25.347	2 Q			2:19.877	1 Q	2:18.731	2nd place, silver medalist(s)
Guo Wei	1500 m	2:18.846	1 Q			2:25.321	3 QB	2:27.376	7
Li Jiajun; Feng Kai; Guo Wei; Li Ye; An Yulong	5000 m relay					6:46.625	2 Q	6:59.633	3rd place, bronze medalist(s)

Women

Athlete	Event	Round one		Quarterfinals		Semifinals		Finals	
Athlete	Event	Time	Rank	Time	Rank	Time	Rank	Time	Final rank
Yang Yang (A)	500 m	45.042	1 Q	44.810	1 Q	44.118 OR	1 Q	44.187	1st place, gold medalist(s)
Wang Chunlu	500 m	44.723	1 Q	44.739	1 Q	44.734	2 Q	44.272	3rd place, bronze medalist(s)
Yang Yang (S)	1000 m	1:40.632	1 Q	1:33.561	1 Q	1:35.072	1 Q	1:37.008	3rd place, bronze medalist(s)
Yang Yang (A)	1000 m	1:37.039	1 Q	1:31.235 OR	1 Q	1:38.037	2 Q	1:36.391	1st place, gold medalist(s)
Yang Yang (S)	1500 m	2:26.943 OR	1 Q			2:32.315	1 Q	DSQ	–
Yang Yang (A)	1500 m	2:29.578	2 Q			2:21.690	2 Q	2:31.791	4
Yang Yang (A); Yang Yang (S); Sun Dandan; Wang Chunlu	3000 m relay					4:15.931	1 Q	4:13.326	2nd place, silver medalist(s)

== Speed skating ==
Men

Event	Athlete	Race 1		Race 2		Total	
Event	Athlete	Time	Rank	Time	Rank	Time	Rank
500 m	Yu Fengtong	1:22.11	36	35.30	21	117.41	34
500 m	Li Yu	35.62	21	35.35	23	70.97	21
1000 m	Yu Fengtong					1:12.07	40
1000 m	Li Yu					1:10.78	35
1500 m	Liu Guangbin					1:52.01	46
1500 m	Ma Yongbin					1:51.81	45

Women

Event	Athlete	Race 1		Race 2		Total	
Event	Athlete	Time	Rank	Time	Rank	Time	Rank
500 m	Xing Aihua	1:44.62	31	39.74	28	144.36	30
500 m	Yang Chunyuan	39.56	28	39.07	23	78.63	24
500 m	Jin Hua	39.06	24	39.20	24	78.26	23
500 m	Wang Manli	38.20	11	28.42	14	76.62	13
1000 m	You Yanchun					1:18.74	30
1000 m	Wang Manli					1:17.37	26
1000 m	Jin Hua					1:17.35	25
1000 m	Song Li					1:16.71	22
1500 m	Zhang Xiaolei					2:01.23	28
1500 m	Gao Yang					1:59.51	19
1500 m	Song Li					1:58.31	15
3000 m	Zhang Xiaolei					4:16.53	23
3000 m	Gao Yang					4:12.39	20
