= 1997 World Short Track Speed Skating Team Championships =

Short track team championship

- Location: Seoul, South Korea
- Start date: 4 April 1997
- End date: 6 April 1997

The 1997 World Short Track Speed Skating Team Championships was the 7th edition of the World Short Track Speed Skating Team Championships which took place on 4–6 April 1997 in Seoul, South Korea. The qualifying competition took place on 4 April 1997 for 7 nations in the men's event and 6 nations in the women's event. Three best nations qualified for the final event.

== Medal winners ==
Event	Gold	Silver	Bronze
Men	South Korea; Kim Dong-sung; Lee Ho-eung; Kim Sun-tae; Lee Jun-hwan; Jun Suk-ju	Japan; Satoru Terao; Hitoshi Uematsu; Yugo Shinohara; Naoya Tamura; Jun Uematsu	Italy; Orazio Fagone; Maurizio Carnino; Mirko Vuillermin; Michele Antonioli; Nicola Franceschina
Women	South Korea; Won Hye-kyung; Chun Lee-kyung; An Sang-mi; Kim Yun-mi; Choi Min-kyung	Canada; Nathalie Lambert; Isabelle Charest; Christine Boudrias; Catherine Dussault; Annie Perreault	Japan; Ayako Tsubaki; Ikue Teshigawara; Sachi Ozawa; Nobuko Yamada; Chikage Tanaka

== Results ==
=== Men ===
Rank	Nation	Total
1st place, gold medalist(s)	South Korea	57
2nd place, silver medalist(s)	Japan	40
3rd place, bronze medalist(s)	Italy	39
4	Canada	38
5	China	29
6	Hungary	17
7	Netherlands	15
8	Australia	Qual. comp.
9	United States	Qual. comp.
10	Kazakhstan	Qual. comp.
11	South Africa	Qual. comp.

=== Women ===
Rank	Nation	Total
1st place, gold medalist(s)	South Korea	59
2nd place, silver medalist(s)	Canada	45
3rd place, bronze medalist(s)	Japan	40
4	China	33
5	Netherlands	25
6	Italy	22
7	Austria	11
8	United States	Qual. comp.
9	Ukraine	Qual. comp.
10	Australia	Qual. comp.
