= Short-track speed skating at the 1998 Winter Olympics =

Short Track Speed Skating at the XVIII Olympic Winter Games
- Venue: White Ring
- Dates: 17–21 February
- No. of events: 6
- Competitors: 94 from 18 nations

Short track speed skating at the 1998 Winter Olympics was held from 17 to 21 February. Six events were contested at the White Ring.

== Medal summary ==
=== Medal table ===
Rank	Nation	Gold	Silver	Bronze	Total
1	South Korea	3	1	2	6
2	Canada	2	0	2	4
3	Japan	1	0	1	2
4	China	0	5	1	6
Totals (4 entries)		6	6	6	18

South Korea led the medal table with six, including three golds. Chun Lee-kyung led the individual medal table, with two golds and one bronze. The top men's medalist was Kim Dong-sung, who won one gold and one silver.

=== Men's events ===
Event	Gold		Silver		Bronze	
500 metres	Takafumi Nishitani; Japan	42.862	An Yulong; China	43.022	Hitoshi Uematsu; Japan	43.713
1000 metres	Kim Dong-sung; South Korea	1:32.375	Li Jiajun; China	1:32.428	Éric Bédard; Canada	1:32.661
5000 metre relay	Canada; Éric Bédard; Derrick Campbell; François Drolet; Marc Gagnon	7:06.075	South Korea; Chae Ji-hoon; Lee Jun-hwan; Lee Ho-eung; Kim Dong-sung	7:06.776	China; Li Jiajun; Feng Kai; Yuan Ye; An Yulong	7:11.559

=== Women's events ===
Event	Gold		Silver		Bronze	
500 metres	Annie Perreault; Canada	46.568	Yang Yang (S); China	46.627	Chun Lee-kyung; South Korea	46.335 (Note: Jeon won a medal as the winner of the B Final, as the A final featured two skaters failing to finish.)
1000 metres	Chun Lee-kyung; South Korea	1:42.776	Yang Yang (S); China	1:43.343	Won Hye-kyung; South Korea	1:43.361
3000 metre relay	South Korea; Chun Lee-kyung; Won Hye-kyung; An Sang-mi; Kim Yun-mi	4:16.260	China; Yang Yang (A); Yang Yang (S); Wang Chunlu; Sun Dandan	4:16.383	Canada; Christine Boudrias; Isabelle Charest; Annie Perreault; Tania Vicent	4:21.205

== Participating NOCs ==
Eighteen nations competed in the short track events at Nagano. Belarus, the Germany, Poland and Ukraine made their short track debuts.

- Australia (5)
- Bulgaria (2)
- Canada (8)
- China (8)
- France (2)
- Germany (5)
- Great Britain (5)
- Italy (9)
- Japan (11)
- South Korea (9)
- Mongolia (2)
- Netherlands (5)
- Poland (1)
- North Korea (6)
- Russia (2)
- Sweden (1)
- Ukraine (2)
- United States (11)
