= Short-track speed skating at the 2002 Winter Olympics =

Short Track Speed Skating at the XIX Olympic Winter Games
- Venue: Salt Lake Ice Center
- Dates: 13–23 February 2002
- No. of events: 8
- Competitors: 106 from 26 nations

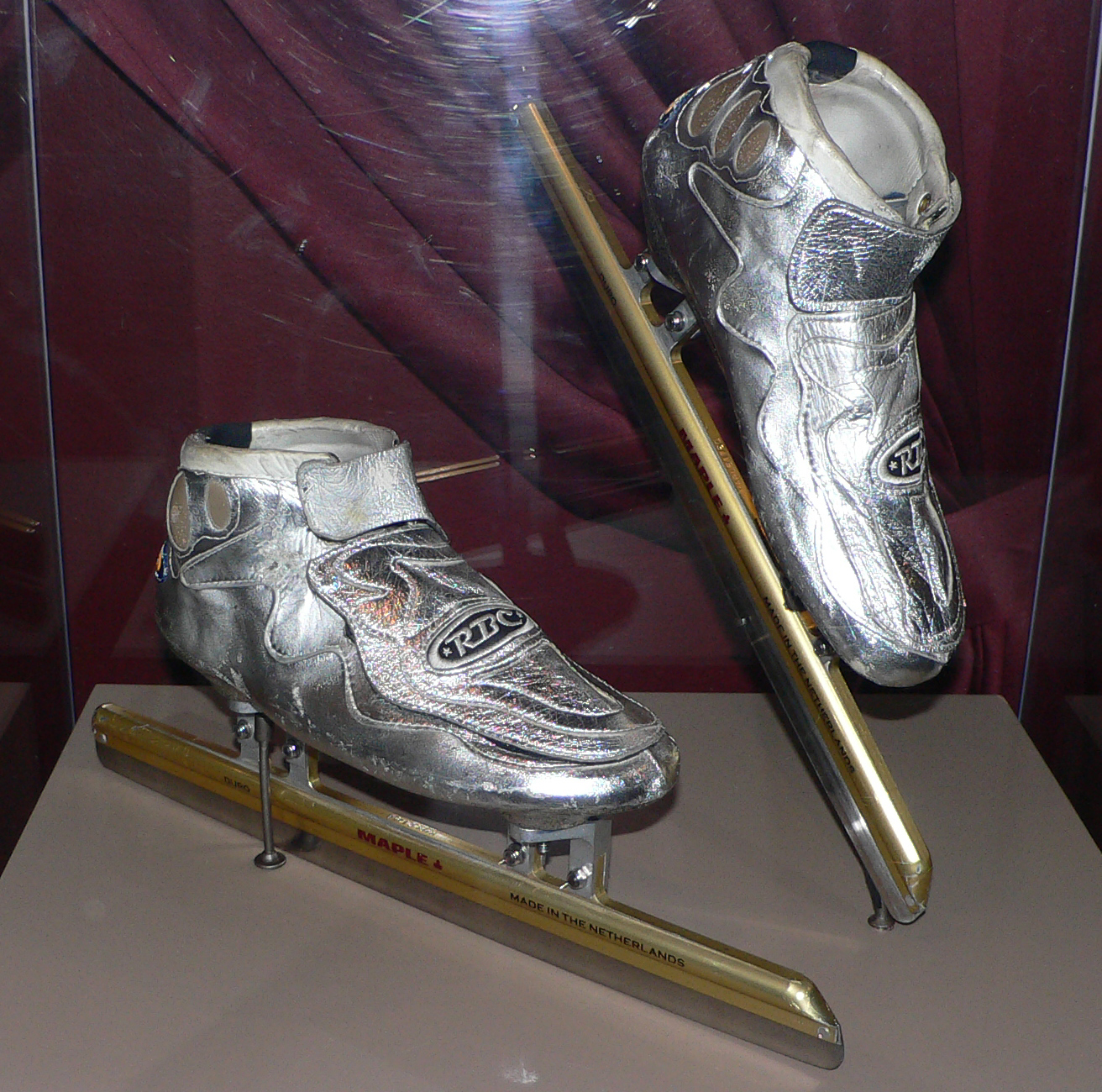
The skates Apolo Anton Ohno wore at the 2002 Winter Olympics are preserved in the Smithsonian Institution National Museum of American History.

For the long track speed skating events, see Speed skating at the 2002 Winter Olympics

Short track speed skating at the 2002 Winter Olympics was held from 13 to 23 February. Eight events were contested at Salt Lake Ice Center (normally called Delta Center). Two new events were added for these games, with the men's and women's 1500 metres making debuts.

== Medal summary ==
=== Medal table ===
Rank	Nation	Gold	Silver	Bronze	Total
1	China	2	2	3	7
2	South Korea	2	2	0	4
3	Canada	2	1	3	6
4	United States	1	1	1	3
5	Australia	1	0	0	1
6	Bulgaria	0	1	1	2
7	Italy	0	1	0	1
Totals (7 entries)		8	8	8	24

China led the overall table with seven medals, while Evgenia Radanova's two medals for Bulgaria were their first in the sport.

=== Men's events ===
Event	Gold		Silver		Bronze	
500 metres	Marc Gagnon; Canada	41.802	Jonathan Guilmette; Canada	41.994	Rusty Smith; United States	42.027
1000 metres	Steven Bradbury; Australia	1:29.109	Apolo Ohno; United States	1:30.160	Mathieu Turcotte; Canada	1:30.563
1500 metres	Apolo Ohno; United States	2:18.541	Li Jiajun; China	2:18.731	Marc Gagnon; Canada	2:18.806
5000 metre relay	Canada; Jonathan Guilmette; Marc Gagnon; François-Louis Tremblay; Mathieu Turcotte; Éric Bédard	6:51.579	Italy; Nicola Franceschina; Nicola Rodigari; Fabio Carta; Maurizio Carnino; Michele Antonioli	6:56.327	China; Li Jiajun; Feng Kai; Guo Wei; Li Ye; An Yulong	6:59.633

=== Women's events ===
Event	Gold		Silver		Bronze	
500 metres	Yang Yang (A); China	44.187	Evgenia Radanova; Bulgaria	44.252	Wang Chunlu; China	44.272
1000 metres	Yang Yang (A); China	1:36.391	Ko Gi-hyun; South Korea	1:36.427	Yang Yang (S); China	1:37.008
1500 metres	Ko Gi-hyun; South Korea	2:31.581	Choi Eun-kyung; South Korea	2:31.610	Evgenia Radanova; Bulgaria	2:31.723
3000 metre relay	South Korea; Choi Eun-kyung; Choi Min-kyung; Park Hye-won; Joo Min-jin	4:12.793	China; Yang Yang (A); Yang Yang (S); Sun Dandan; Wang Chunlu	4:13.326	Canada; Isabelle Charest; Alanna Kraus; Amélie Goulet-Nadon; Marie-Ève Drolet; Tania Vicent	4:15.738

== Records ==
Two world records and fifteen Olympic records were set in Salt Lake City.

Event	Date	Round	Team	Time	OR	WR
Men's 500 metres	23 February	Heat 7	Jonathan Guilmette (CAN)	42.326	OR	
Men's 500 metres	23 February	Quarterfinal 3	Kim Dong-sung (KOR)	41.806	OR	
Men's 500 metres	23 February	A Final	Marc Gagnon (CAN)	41.802	OR	
Men's 1000 metres	13 February	Heat 7	Rusty Smith (USA)	1:28.183	OR	
Men's 1000 metres	16 February	Quarterfinal 3	Mathieu Turcotte (CAN)	1:27.185	OR	
Men's 1500 metres	13 February	Heat 5	Guo Wei (CHN)	2:18.846	OR	
Men's 1500 metres	16 February	Semifinal 1	Mathieu Turcotte (CAN)	2:15.942	OR	
Men's 5000 metre relay	13 February	Heat 1	Canada; Éric Bédard; Marc Gagnon; François-Louis Tremblay; Mathieu Turcotte	6:45.455	OR	
Women's 500 metres	16 February	Heat 3	Wang Chunlu (CHN)	44.723	OR	
Women's 500 metres	16 February	Semifinal 1	Yang Yang (A) (CHN)	44.118	OR	
Women's 1000 metres	23 February	Quarterfinal 1	Yang Yang (A) (CHN)	1:31.235	OR	
Women's 1500 metres	13 February	Heat 1	Yang Yang (S) (CHN)	2:26.943	OR	
Women's 1500 metres	13 February	Semifinal 2	Choi Eun-kyung (KOR)	2:21.069	OR	WR
Women's 3000 metre relay	13 February	Heat 1	South Korea; Choi Eun-kyung; Choi Min-kyung; Park Hye-won; Joo Min-jin	4:14.977	OR	
Women's 3000 metre relay	13 February	A Final	South Korea; Choi Eun-kyung; Choi Min-kyung; Park Hye-won; Joo Min-jin	4:12.793	OR	WR

== Participating NOCs ==
Twenty-six nations competed in the short track events at Salt Lake City. Belarus, the Czech Republic, Hong Kong, Israel, Romania and Slovakia made their short track debuts.

- Australia (5)
- Belarus (1)
- Belgium (4)
- Bulgaria (7)
- Canada (10)
- China (9)
- Czech Republic (1)
- France (4)
- Germany (7)
- Great Britain (5)
- Hong Kong (2)
- Hungary (6)
- Israel (1)
- Italy (10)
- Japan (10)
- South Korea (10)
- Mongolia (2)
- Netherlands (1)
- New Zealand (1)
- Poland (1)
- Romania (1)
- Russia (2)
- Slovakia (1)
- Sweden (1)
- Ukraine (1)
- United States (8)
