= Maciej Pryczek =

Polish speed skater

Personal information
- Nationality: Polish
- Born: 29 April 1976 (age 49); Gliwice, Poland

Sport
- Sport: Short track speed skating

Maciej Pryczek (born 29 April 1976) is a Polish short track speed skater. He competed in two events at the 1998 Winter Olympics.
