= Lee Ho-eung =

Short track speed skater

Medal record

Men's short track speed skating

Representing South Korea

Olympic Games
Silver medal – second place	1998 Nagano	5000 m relay

World Championships
Gold medal – first place	1997 Nagano	5000 m relay
Silver medal – second place	1998 Vienna	5000 m relay

World Team Championships
Gold medal – first place	1997 Seoul	Team
Silver medal – second place	1998 Bormio	Team

Asian Winter Games
Bronze medal – third place	1999 Gangwon	5000 m relay

- Lee Ho-eung
- Hangul: 이호응
- RR: I Hoeung
- MR: I Hoŭng

Lee Ho-eung (born 15 February 1978) is a South Korean short track speed skater.

At the 1998 Winter Olympics he won a silver medal in 5000 m relay, together with teammates Chae Ji-hoon, Lee Jun-hwan and Kim Dong-sung.

== Education ==
- Dankook University
- Seoul Gwangmun High School
