= An Sang-mi =

South Korean short-track speed skater (born 1979)

Personal information
- Born: 12 November 1979 (age 46)
Medal record
Women's short track speed skating
Representing South Korea
Olympic Games
Gold medal – first place	1998 Nagano	3000 m relay
World Championships
Gold medal – first place	2000 Sheffield	3000 m
Silver medal – second place	1997 Nagano	3000 m relay
Silver medal – second place	1998 Vienna	3000 m relay
Silver medal – second place	2000 Sheffield	Overall
Silver medal – second place	2000 Sheffield	3000 m relay
Bronze medal – third place	2000 Sheffield	500 m
World Team Championships
Gold medal – first place	1995 Zoetermeer	Team
Gold medal – first place	1996 Lake Placid	Team
Gold medal – first place	1997 Seoul	Team
Silver medal – second place	1993 Budapest	Team
Silver medal – second place	1998 Bormio	Team
Silver medal – second place	2000 The Hague	Team
Bronze medal – third place	1999 St. Louis	Team
World Junior Championships
Gold medal – first place	1997 Marquette	Overall
Winter Universiade
Gold medal – first place	2001 Zakopane	3000 m
Bronze medal – third place	2001 Zakopane	1000 m
Asian Winter Games
Gold medal – first place	1999 Gangwon	3000 m relay
Silver medal – second place	1996 Harbin	3000 m relay

- An Sang-mi
- Hangul: 안상미
- RR: An Sangmi
- MR: An Sangmi

An Sang-mi (Korean: 안상미, born 12 November 1979) is a retired South Korean short track speed skater.

She won a gold medal in the 3000 m relay at the 1998 Winter Olympics, together with teammates Chun Lee-kyung, Won Hye-kyung and Kim Yun-mi.
