= Takafumi Nishitani =

Japanese short track speed skater (born 1979)

Personal information
- Born: January 17, 1979 (age 47) Japan

Sport
- Country: Japan
- Sport: Short track speed skating
Medal record
Olympic Games
Gold medal – first place	1998 Nagano	500 m
World Championships
Silver medal – second place	2000 Sheffield	5000m relay
World Team Championships
Bronze medal – third place	1999 St. Louis	Team
Asian Winter Games
Silver medal – second place	2003 Aomori	500 m
Bronze medal – third place	2003 Aomori	5000 m relay
Winter Universiade
Gold medal – first place	1999 Poprad-Tatry	5000 m relay
Gold medal – first place	2001 Zakopane	500 m
Silver medal – second place	1999 Poprad-Tatry	3000 m
Bronze medal – third place	1999 Poprad-Tatry	500 m
Bronze medal – third place	2001 Zakopane	5000 m relay

Takafumi Nishitani (西谷 岳文, Nishitani Takafumi) (born January 17, 1979, in Tadaoka, Osaka) is a Japanese short track speed skater. He won a gold medal on the 500 m at the 1998 Winter Olympics in Nagano.

Now, Nishitani practices Keirin.
