= Hayato Sueyoshi =

Japanese speed skater (born 1982)

Personal information
- Nationality: Japanese
- Born: 22 June 1982 (age 42); Osaka, Japan

Sport
- Sport: Short track speed skating

Hayato Sueyoshi (born 22 June 1982) is a Japanese short track speed skater. He competed in the men's 1500 metres event at the 2006 Winter Olympics.
