= Christine Boudrias =

Canadian short-track speed skater

Olympic medal record

Women's short track speed skating

Representing Canada
| Silver medal – second place | 1994 Lillehammer | 3000 m relay |
| Bronze medal – third place | 1998 Nagano | 3000 m relay |

Christine Boudrias (born September 3, 1972, in Montreal, Quebec) is a Canadian short track speed skater who competed in the 1994 Winter Olympics and in the 1998 Winter Olympics.

She was a member of the Canadian 3000 m relay team which won silver in 1994, and bronze during the 1998 Winter Olympics.
