= Atsuko Takata =

Japanese speed skater (born 1977)

Personal information
- Nationality: Japanese
- Born: 18 April 1977 (age 47); Osaka, Japan

Sport
- Sport: Short track speed skating

Atsuko Takata (高田 貴子, Takata Atsuko, born 18 April 1977) is a Japanese short track speed skater. She competed in the women's 3000 metre relay event at the 2002 Winter Olympics.
