= South Korea at the 1999 Asian Winter Games =

- IOC code: KOR
- NOC: Korean Olympic Committee

in Gangwon
- Competitors: 101
- Medals Ranked 2nd: Gold 11 Silver 10 Bronze 14 Total 35

Asian Winter Games appearances (overview)
- 1986; 1990; 1996; 1999; 2003; 2007; 2011; 2017; 2025; 2029

South Korea (IOC designation:Korea) participated in the 1999 Asian Winter Games held in Yongpyong, Chuncheon, and Gangneung in Gangwon, South Korea from January 30, 1999 to February 6, 1999.

== Medal summary ==
=== Medal table ===
| Sport | Gold | Silver | Bronze | Total |
|---|---|---|---|---|
| Short track speed skating | 6 | 3 | 4 | 13 |
| Alpine skiing | 3 | 3 | 4 | 10 |
| Speed skating | 2 | 4 | 2 | 8 |
| Biathlon | 0 | 0 | 2 | 2 |
| Cross-country skiing | 0 | 0 | 1 | 1 |
| Figure skating | 0 | 0 | 1 | 1 |
| Totals (6 entries) | 11 | 10 | 14 | 35 |

=== Medalists ===
==== Gold ====
Alpine skiing

- Men's Slalom - Hur Seung-wook
- Men's Super Giant Slalom - Hur Seung-wook
- Women's Super Giant Slalom - Yoo Hye-min

Short track speed skating

- Men's 500 m - Lee Jun-hwan
- Men's 1500 m - Kim Dong-sung
- Men's 3000 m - Kim Dong-sung
- Women's 1500 m - Kim Yoon-mi
- Women's 3000 m - Kim Moon-jung
- Women's 3000 m Relay - Choi Min-kyung, Kim Yoon-mi, An Sang-mi, Kim Moon-jung

Speed skating

- Men's 1000 m - Choi Jae-bong
- Men's 1500 m - Choi Jae-bong

==== Silver ====
Alpine skiing

- Men's Giant Slalom - Hur Seung-wook
- Women's Giant Slalom - Yoo Hye-min
- Women's Super Giant Slalom - Yang Woo-young

Short track speed skating

- Men's 1000 m - Kim Dong-sung
- Men's 3000 m - Lee Jun-hwan
- Women's 500 m - Choi Min-kyung

Speed skating

- Men's 500 m - Jaegal Sung-yeol
- Men's 1000 m - Lee Kyu-hyuk
- Men's 1500 m - Chun Joo-hyun
- Men's 5000 m - Moon Jun

==== Bronze ====
Alpine skiing

- Men's Slalom - Choi Moon-sung
- Men's Giant Slalom - Lee Ki-hyun
- Men's Super Giant Slalom - Choi Moon-sung

Biathlon

- Men's 4 x 7.5 km Relay - Son Hae-kwon, Shin Byung-kook, Choi Neung-chul, Jeon Jae-won
- Women's 4 x 7.5 km Relay - Kim Ja-youn, Kim Mi-young, Yoo Jea-sun, Choi Mi-jung

Figure skating

- Ice Dancing - Yang Tae-hwa / Lee Chuen-gun

Cross-country skiing

- Men's 4 x 10 km Relay - Park Byeong-ju, Park Byung-chul, Shin Doo-sun, Ahn Jin-soo

Short track speed skating

- Men's 1500 m - Lee Jun-hwan
- Men's 5000 m Relay - Kim Dong-sung, Lee Jun-hwan, Lee Ho-eung, Kim Seon-tae
- Women's 1000 m - Kim Yoon-mi
- Women's 3000 m - Choi Min-kyung

Speed skating

- Men's 1000 m - Chun Joo-hyun
- Men's 10000 m - Moon Jun
