= Yuan Ye (speed skater) =

Chinese short track speed skater

Medal record

Men's short track speed skating

Representing China

Olympic Games
| Bronze medal – third place | 1998 Nagano | 5000 m relay |

World Championships
| Bronze medal – third place | 1998 Vienna | 500 m |
| Bronze medal – third place | 1998 Vienna | 5000 m relay |
| Gold medal – first place | 1999 Sofia | 5000 m relay |
| Gold medal – first place | 2000 Sheffield | 5000 m relay |

World Team Championships
| Gold medal – first place | 1999 St. Louis | Team |

Yuan Ye (Chinese: 袁野; pinyin: Yuán Yě; born 1 July 1979) is a Chinese short track speed skater.

He who won a bronze medal in the 5000 m relay at the 1998 Winter Olympics, together with teammates Li Jiajun, Feng Kai and An Yulong.
