= Lee Seung-jae (speed skater) =

South Korean speed skater

Personal information
- Nationality: South Korean
- Born: 6 April 1982 (age 44)

Sport
- Sport: Short track speed skating

Lee Seung-jae (born 6 April 1982) is a South Korean short track speed skater. He competed in two events at the 2002 Winter Olympics.
