= Kim Moon-jung =

South Korean speed skater (born 1981)

Medal record

Women's short track speed skating

Representing South Korea

World Championships
Bronze medal – third place	1999 Sofia	1000 m
Bronze medal – third place	1999 Sofia	1500 m
Bronze medal – third place	1999 Sofia	Overall

World Team Championships
Bronze medal – third place	1999 St. Louis	Team

Asian Winter Games
Gold medal – first place	1999 Gangwon	3000 m relay
Gold medal – first place	1999 Gangwon	3000 m

World Junior Championships
Gold medal – first place	1998 St. Louis	1500 m
Gold medal – first place	1999 Montreal	1000 m
Silver medal – second place	1996 Courmayeur	1500 m
Silver medal – second place	1998 St. Louis	Overall
Silver medal – second place	1999 Montreal	Overall
Bronze medal – third place	1996 Courmayeur	Overall
Bronze medal – third place	1998 St. Louis	500 m

Kim Moon-jung (Korean: 김문정; RR: Gim Munjeong; born 23 December 1981) is a retired South Korean short track speed skater.

== Career ==
She is 1999 World Championships medallist and 1999 Asian Games champion. After retiring from competitive short-track speed skating she worked as a coach and a video analyst for the Korea national junior team.
