= Lee Jun-hwan =

Short track speed skater (born 1977)

Personal information
- Born: 13 August 1977 (age 48)
Medal record
Men's short track speed skating
Representing South Korea
Olympic Games
Silver medal – second place	1998 Nagano	5000 m relay
World Championships
Gold medal – first place	1997 Nagano	5000 m relay
Silver medal – second place	1997 Nagano	1000 m
Silver medal – second place	1998 Vienna	5000 m relay
World Team Championships
Gold medal – first place	1997 Seoul	Team
Silver medal – second place	1998 Bormio	Team
Silver medal – second place	2000 The Hague	Team
Winter Universiade
Gold medal – first place	2005 Chonju (Jeonju)	5,000 m relay
Asian Winter Games
Gold medal – first place	1996 Harbin	5000 m relay
Gold medal – first place	1999 Gangwon	500 m
Silver medal – second place	1999 Gangwon	3000 m
Bronze medal – third place	1996 Harbin	1500 m
Bronze medal – third place	1999 Gangwon	1500 m
Bronze medal – third place	1999 Gangwon	5000 m relay
World Junior Championships
Silver medal – second place	1994 Seoul	Overall

Lee Jun-Hwan (Korean: 이준환; Hanja: 李濬煥; born 13 August 1977) is a South Korean short track speed skater.

At the 1998 Winter Olympics he won a silver medal in 5000 m relay, together with teammates Chae Ji-Hoon, Lee Ho-Eung and Kim Dong-Sung.
