= Kim Yun-mi (speed skater) =

Short track speed skater (born 1980)

Kim Yunmi (김윤미)
Personal information
- Born: December 1, 1980 (age 45) Seoul, South Korea
- Height: 1.63 m (5 ft 4 in)
- Weight: 49.9 kg (110 lb; 7.86 st)

Sport
- Country: South Korea
- Sport: Speed skating
Medal record
Women's short track speed skating
Representing South Korea
Olympic Games
| Gold medal – first place | 1994 Lillehammer | 3000 m relay |
| Gold medal – first place | 1998 Nagano | 3000 m relay |
World Championships
| Silver medal – second place | 1995 Gjøvik | 3000 m |
| Silver medal – second place | 1995 Gjøvik | 3000 m relay |
| Silver medal – second place | 1997 Nagano | 3000 m relay |
| Silver medal – second place | 1998 Vienna | 3000 m relay |
| Bronze medal – third place | 1994 Guildford | 3000 m relay |
| Bronze medal – third place | 1995 Gjøvik | Overall |
| Bronze medal – third place | 1995 Gjøvik | 500 m |
| Bronze medal – third place | 1998 Vienna | 1000 m |
World Team Championships
| Gold medal – first place | 1995 Zoetermeer | Team |
| Gold medal – first place | 1996 Lake Placid | Team |
| Gold medal – first place | 1997 Seoul | Team |
| Silver medal – second place | 1993 Budapest | Team |
| Silver medal – second place | 1994 Cambridge | Team |
| Silver medal – second place | 1998 Bormio | Team |
World Junior Championships
| Gold medal – first place | 1995 Calgary | Overall |
| Gold medal – first place | 1995 Calgary | 500 m |
| Gold medal – first place | 1995 Calgary | 1000 m |
| Gold medal – first place | 1995 Calgary | 1500 m |
| Silver medal – second place | 1995 Calgary | 1500 m s-final |
Asian Winter Games
| Gold medal – first place | 1996 Harbin | 3000 m |
| Gold medal – first place | 1999 Gangwon | 1500 m |
| Gold medal – first place | 1999 Gangwon | 3000 m relay |
| Silver medal – second place | 1996 Harbin | 3000 m relay |
| Bronze medal – third place | 1996 Harbin | 1500 m |
| Bronze medal – third place | 1999 Gangwon | 1000 m |
International Challenger Cup
| Gold medal – first place | 1997 Canada | 3000M |
| Gold medal – first place | 1997 Canada | 3000M Relay |
| Gold medal – first place | 1997 USA | 1500M |
| Gold medal – first place | 1997 USA | 3000M Relay |
| Gold medal – first place | 1997 Netherlands | 500M |
| Gold medal – first place | 1997 Netherlands | 3000M Relay |
| Gold medal – first place | 1997 Netherlands | Overall |
| Gold medal – first place | 1997 Netherlands | 3000M Relay |
| Silver medal – second place | 1997 USA | 1000M |
| Silver medal – second place | 1997 USA | Overall |
| Silver medal – second place | 1997 Netherlands | 1000M |
| Silver medal – second place | 1997 Netherlands | 3000M |
| Silver medal – second place | 1997 Nobeyama, Japan | 3000M Relay |
| Bronze medal – third place | 1997 Canada | Overall |

Kim Yunmi (Korean: 김윤미; Hanja: 金潤美; born December 1, 1980, in Seoul) is a South Korean short track speed skater, who won gold medals in the 3000 m relay at the 1994 and 1998 Winter Olympics.

Kim won her first Olympic gold medal at the 1994 Winter Olympics in Lillehammer at the age of 13 years and 85 days, making her the youngest-ever Olympic gold medallist and breaking a record previously held by Marjorie Gestring. Due to this, the ISU later set the minimum age limit to be 15 years old.

Since 2004 she has lived in Maryland, United States where she teaches speed skating.
