= Takehiro Kodera =

Japanese speed skater (born 1978)

Personal information
- Nationality: Japanese
- Born: 14 November 1978 (age 47) Aichi, Japan

Sport
- Sport: Short track speed skating
Medal record
World Championships
Silver medal – second place	2000 Sheffield	5000m relay
World Team Championships
Bronze medal – third place	1999 St. Louis	Team
Bronze medal – third place	2004 Saint Petersburg	Team

Takehiro Kodera (小寺 武大, Kodera Takehiro; born 14 November 1978) is a Japanese short track speed skater. He competed at the 1998 Winter Olympics and the 2002 Winter Olympics.
