= Choi Min-kyung =

South Korean speed skater (born 1982)

Personal information
- Born: 25 August 1982 (age 43) Seoul, South Korea
- Height: 162 cm (5 ft 4 in)
- Weight: 60 kg (132 lb)

Sport
- Country: South Korea; France (2004–2006)
- Sport: Short-track speed skating
Medal record
Women's Short Track Speed Skating
Representing South Korea
Olympic Games
Gold medal – first place	2002 Salt Lake City	3000 m relay
World Championships
Gold medal – first place	2002 Montreal	3000 m relay
Silver medal – second place	2000 Sheffield	3000 m relay
Silver medal – second place	2001 Jeonju	3000 m relay
Winter Universiade
Gold medal – first place	2001 Zakopane	1000 m
Gold medal – first place	2001 Zakopane	1500 m
Bronze medal – third place	2001 Zakopane	3000 m
Asian Winter Games
Silver medal – second place	1999 Gangwon	500 m
Bronze medal – third place	1999 Gangwon	3000 m
World Junior Championships
Silver medal – second place	2000 Székesfehérvár	Overall
Bronze medal – third place	2001 Warszawa	Overall
Representing France
World Championships
Bronze medal – third place	2005 Beijing	3000 m relay
European Championships
Silver medal – second place	2005 Turin	3000 m relay
Silver medal – second place	2006 Krynica-Zdrój	3000 m relay

Choi Min-kyung (Korean: 최민경; Hanja: 崔敏敬; born 25 August 1982) is a South Korean short track speed skater.

She competed for South Korea at the 1998 Winter Olympics. At the 2002 Winter Olympics, she won a gold medal in the 3000 m relay with teammates Choi Eun-kyung, Park Hye-won, and Joo Min-jin.

In 2004, Choi joined the French national team. She competed for France at the 2006 Winter Olympics.
