= Chikage Tanaka =

Japanese speed skater (born 1973)

Personal information
- Nationality: Japanese
- Born: 23 June 1973 (age 53) Nagano, Japan

Sport
- Sport: Short track speed skating

Chikage Tanaka (田中 千景, Tanaka Chikage; born 23 June 1973) is a Japanese short track speed skater. She competed at the 1998 Winter Olympics, the 2002 Winter Olympics and the 2006 Winter Olympics.
