= Hitoshi Uematsu =

Japanese short-track speed skater (born 1974)

Medal record

Men's short-track speed skating

Representing Japan

Olympic Games
Bronze medal – third place	1998 Nagano	500 m

Asian Games
Silver medal – second place	1999 Gangwon	5000 m relay

Hitoshi Uematsu (植松 仁, Uematsu Hitoshi) (born 21 June 1974) is a Japanese short-track speed skater. He received a bronze medal on the 500 m at the 1998 Winter Olympics in Nagano.
