= Sun Dandan =

Short track speed skater

Medal record

Women's short track speed skating

Representing China

Olympic Games
Silver medal – second place	1998 Nagano	3000 m relay
Silver medal – second place	2002 Salt Lake City	3000 m relay

Asian Winter Games
Gold medal – first place	1996 Harbin	3000 m relay
Silver medal – second place	1996 Harbin	500 m

Sun Dandan (simplified Chinese: 孙丹丹; traditional Chinese: 孫丹丹; pinyin: Sūn Dāndān, born 3 July 1978 in Changchun) is a Chinese short track speed skater, who won silver medals in the 3000 m relay at the 1998 and 2002 Winter Olympics. As of 2022, she is the head coach for short track speed skating team of Hong Kong, China.
