= Yang Yang (speed skater, born 1976) =

Chinese sports administrator and retired short track speed skater (born 1976)

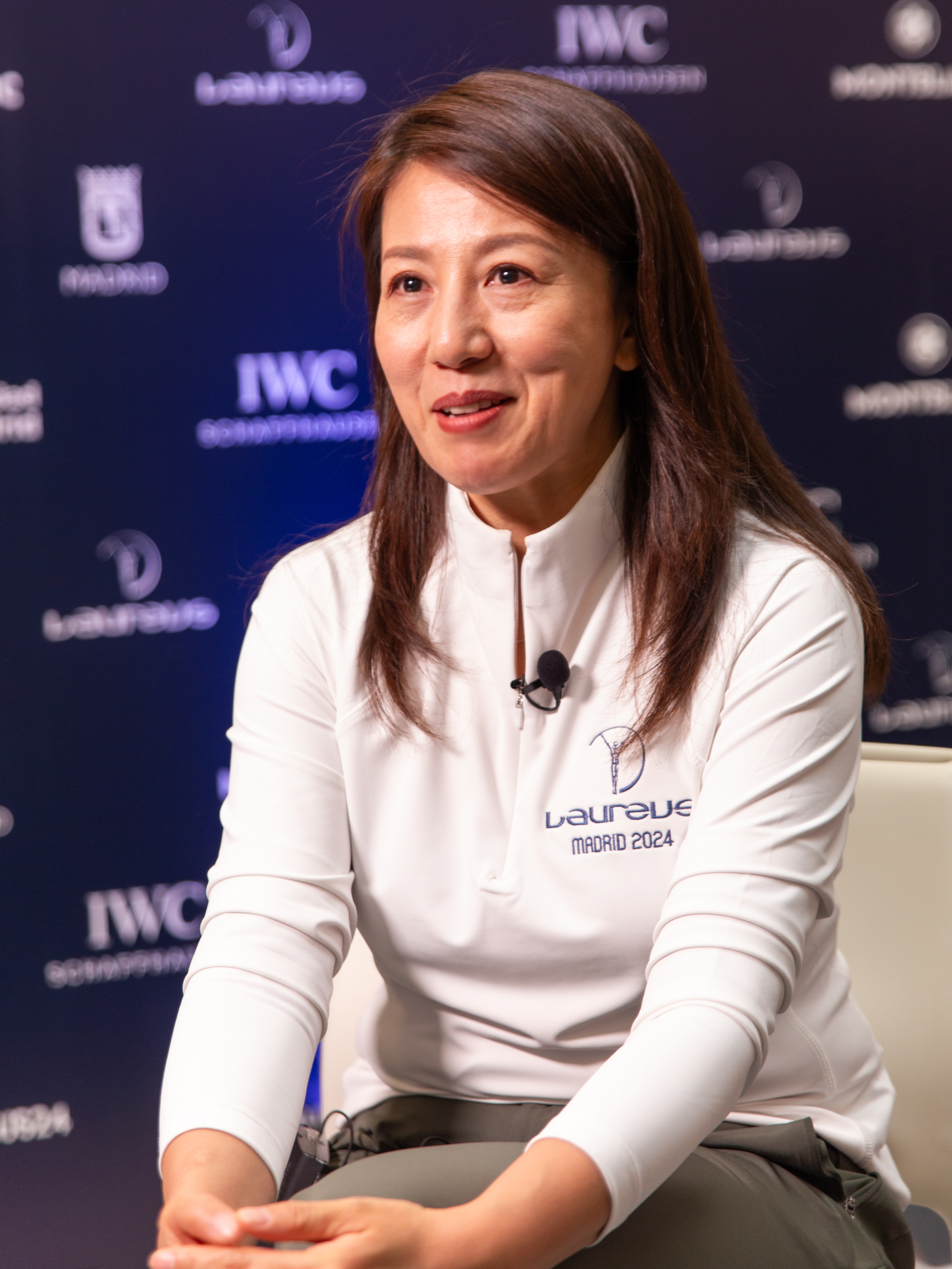
- Yang Yang in 2024

Vice President of World Anti-Doping Agency
- Incumbent
- Assumed office 1 January 2020
- President: Witold Bańka

Vice-chair of the All-China Youth Federation
- In office 25 August 2010 – 17 July 2020
- Chair: Wang Xiao; He Junke

Member of the International Olympic Committee
- In office February 2010 – September 2018
- President: Jacques Rogge; Thomas Bach

Personal details
- Born: 24 August 1976 (age 50) Tangyuan County, Jiamusi, Heilongjiang, China
- Party: Communist
- Spouse: Zhang Zhen (m. 2007)
- Children: 1
- Education: Tsinghua University
- Sports career
- Height: 1.65 m (5 ft 5 in)
- Weight: 60 kg (132 lb; 9 st 6 lb)
- Sport: Women's short track speed skating
- Events: 500 metres, 1000 metres, 1500 metre, 3000 metre, relay
- Retired: 2006

Sports achievements and titles
- Personal bests: 500 m: 44:084; 2002-02-20; Calgary; 1000 m: 1:30.216; 2005-10-02; Hangzhou; 2005 / 2006 World Cup; 1500 m: 2:21.690; 2002-02-13; Salt Lake City; 2002 Winter Olympics; 3000 m: 5:03.652; 2000-12-10; Changchun; 2000 / 2001 World Cup
Medal record
Women's short track speed skating
Representing China
Event	1st	2nd	3rd
Olympic Games	2	2	1
World Championships	28	9	5
World Team Championships	4	4	0
Olympic Games
Gold medal – first place	2002 Salt Lake City	500 m
Gold medal – first place	2002 Salt Lake City	1000 m
Silver medal – second place	1998 Nagano	3000 m Relay
Silver medal – second place	2002 Salt Lake City	3000 m Relay
Bronze medal – third place	2006 Turin	1000 m
World Championships
Gold medal – first place	1997 Nagano	500 m
Gold medal – first place	1997 Nagano	1000 m
Gold medal – first place	1997 Nagano	Overall
Gold medal – first place	1998 Vienna	1500 m
Gold medal – first place	1998 Vienna	1000 m
Gold medal – first place	1998 Vienna	Overall
Gold medal – first place	1998 Vienna	3000 m relay
Gold medal – first place	1999 Sofia	500 m
Gold medal – first place	1999 Sofia	1000 m
Gold medal – first place	1999 Sofia	3000 m
Gold medal – first place	1999 Sofia	Overall
Gold medal – first place	1999 Sofia	3000 m relay
Gold medal – first place	2000 Sheffield	1000 m
Gold medal – first place	2000 Sheffield	1500 m
Gold medal – first place	2000 Sheffield	Overall
Gold medal – first place	2000 Sheffield	3000 m relay
Gold medal – first place	2001 Jeonju	1000 m
Gold medal – first place	2001 Jeonju	1500 m
Gold medal – first place	2001 Jeonju	3000 m
Gold medal – first place	2001 Jeonju	Overall
Gold medal – first place	2001 Jeonju	3000 m relay
Gold medal – first place	2002 Montréal	500 m
Gold medal – first place	2002 Montréal	1000 m
Gold medal – first place	2002 Montréal	1500 m
Gold medal – first place	2002 Montréal	Overall
Gold medal – first place	2003 Warsaw	500 m
Gold medal – first place	2003 Warsaw	3000 m relay
Gold medal – first place	2005 Beijing	500 m
Silver medal – second place	1994 Guildford	3000 m relay
Silver medal – second place	1996 The Hague	3000 m relay
Silver medal – second place	1998 Vienna	3000 m
Silver medal – second place	1999 Sofia	1500 m
Silver medal – second place	2000 Sheffield	3000 m
Silver medal – second place	2001 Jeonju	500 m
Silver medal – second place	2002 Montréal	3000 m relay
Silver medal – second place	2003 Warsaw	Overall
Silver medal – second place	2005 Beijing	3000 m relay
Bronze medal – third place	1994 Guildford	500 m
Bronze medal – third place	1994 Guildford	3000 m
Bronze medal – third place	1997 Nagano	3000 m
Bronze medal – third place	2003 Warsaw	1500 m
Bronze medal – third place	2003 Warsaw	1000 m
World Team Championships
Gold medal – first place	1998 Bormio	Team
Gold medal – first place	1999 St. Louis	Team
Gold medal – first place	2000 The Hague	Team
Gold medal – first place	2001 Nobeyama	Team
Silver medal – second place	1995 Zoetermeer	Team
Silver medal – second place	2002 Milwaukee	Team
Silver medal – second place	2003 Sofia	Team
Silver medal – second place	2005 Chuncheon	Team
Asian Winter Games
Gold medal – first place	1996 Harbin	1500 m
Gold medal – first place	1996 Harbin	3000 m relay

Yang Yang (Chinese: 杨扬; pinyin: Yáng Yáng; born 24 August 1976) is a Chinese sports administrator, retired short track speed skater, and businesswoman. She is a two-time Olympic Champion from 2002 Winter Olympics and a six-time overall world champion for 1997–2002. Known as Yang Yang (A), she was formerly a member of the Chinese national short track team. Yang is one of the most accomplished short track speed skaters of all time having won 34 world titles, including six Overall World Championships. She is the first person to have won six overall world titles and won six consecutively. Her victory in the women's 500 m short track at the 2002 Winter Olympics made her China's first-ever Winter Olympics gold medalist. She added a second gold in the women's 1000 m short track at the same Games and has also won two silver and a bronze medal. Yang retired after 2003 World Championships but was persuaded to return as a player-coach during 2004–2005 season to prepare for 2006 Winter Olympics where she won the bronze medal in 1000 m race. She retired again after the Games.

== Naming ==
Yang, born in 1976, is sometimes known as Yang Yang (A), to differentiate her from the speed skater named Yang Yang, born in 1977 and known as Yang Yang (S). The two share the family name but have distinct characters of their given name. The pinyin romanisation renders the names indistinguishable in letters as well as in tone.

The "(A)" identifier was used as a way to distinguish her from the younger Yang Yang. Originally, the older Yang Yang was known as Yang Yang (L) for "large" (大 or 'big' in Chinese is used to distinguish between younger and older persons of roughly the same age), as she is older than Yang Yang (S) for "small"; however, she objected to the "L" identifier, changing it to "A" for "August", her birth month. Although the younger Yang Yang (S) is now retired from competition and there is no longer a need to distinguish between the two in results, Yang Yang (A) still used the identifier in competition, considering it a part of her identity.

== Retirement ==
Yang Yang (A) was chosen to be one of 12,000 torchbearers to carry the Olympic torch for the Vancouver 2010 Olympics, and on 22 November 2009, she ran a portion of the Prince Edward Island legs.

Yang was elected as an IOC member in 2010 becoming mainland China's fourth IOC member. and founding member of the Chinese Athlete Education Foundation. She held the IOC position until 2018.

In 2013, Yang co-founded the Feiyang Skating Centre in Shanghai, a new double-rink facility with an Olympic-sized rink upstairs and a recreational-sized rink downstairs, built to promote ice sports in China.

On 7 September 2019, Yang was elected to vice-presidency of Wada.

In 2021, Yang became a high profile supporter of UNHCR, the UN refugee agency. She amplifies Chinese social media content highlighting the power of sport to transform the lives of people fleeing conflict and persecution.

== Gallery ==
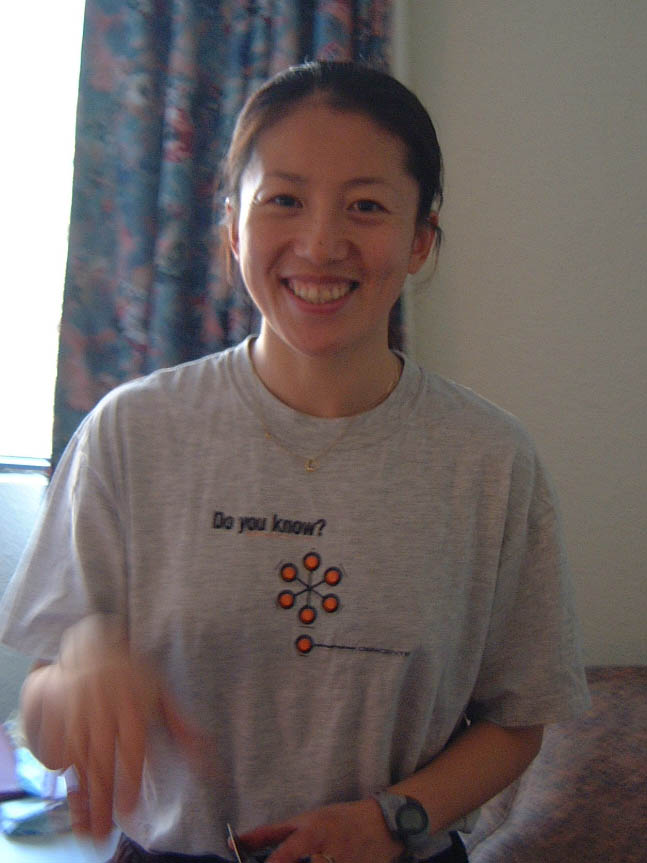
Yang Yang in Montreal, 2002

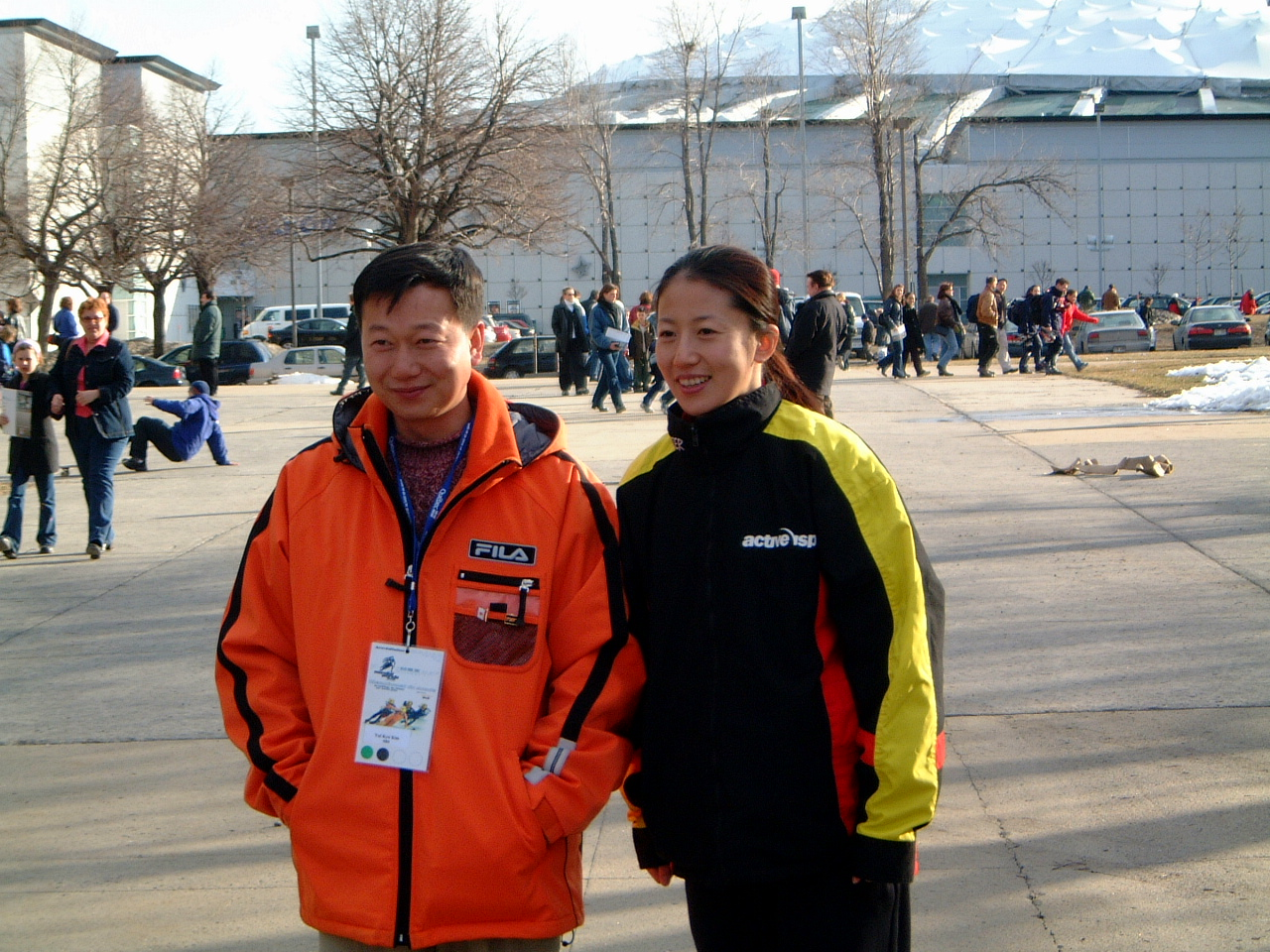
Yang Yang at the Speed Skating World Cup in Montreal, 2002

Yang Yang answering questions from journalists – Speed Skating World Cup, Montreal, 2002

Olympic Games
Preceded by Zhang Min	Flagbearer for China; Turin 2006	Succeeded by Han Xiaopeng
