= Satoru Terao =

Short track speed skater (born 1975)

Personal information
- Nationality: Japanese
- Born: 25 July 1975 (age 51) Aomori, Japan

Sport
- Sport: Short track speed skating
Medal record
Men's short track speed skating
Representing
World Championships
Gold medal – first place	1994 Guildford	5000 m relay
Gold medal – first place	1999 Sofia	1000m
Silver medal – second place	1997 Nagano	3000m
Silver medal – second place	1998 Vienna	1000m
Silver medal – second place	1999 Sofia	1500m
Silver medal – second place	1999 Sofia	3000m
Silver medal – second place	1999 Sofia	Overall
Silver medal – second place	2000 Sheffield	5000m Relay
Silver medal – second place	2001 Jeonju	1500m
Bronze medal – third place	1995 Gjøvik	5000m Relay
Bronze medal – third place	1997 Nagano	500m
Bronze medal – third place	2000 Sheffield	1500m
Bronze medal – third place	2000 Sheffield	500m
World Team Championships
Silver medal – second place	1997 Seoul	Team
Bronze medal – third place	1999 St. Louis	Team
Winter Universiade
Gold medal – first place	1997 Muju-Chonju	500 m
Silver medal – second place	1995 Jaca	5000 m relay
Silver medal – second place	1997 Muju-Chonju	500 m
Silver medal – second place	1997 Muju-Chonju	1000 m
Silver medal – second place	1997 Muju-Chonju	3000 m
Bronze medal – third place	1995 Jaca	3000 m
Asian Winter Games
Silver medal – second place	1996 Harbin	5000 m relay
Silver medal – second place	1999 Gangwon	5000 m relay
Silver medal – second place	2003 Aomori	1000 m
Bronze medal – third place	1999 Gangwon	500m
Bronze medal – third place	2003 Aomori	5000 m relay

Satoru Terao (寺尾 悟, Terao Satoru; born 25 July 1975) is a Japanese short track speed skater. He competed at the 1994, 1998, 2002 and the 2010 Winter Olympics.
