= Kim Dong-sung =

Short track speed skater

Personal information
- Born: February 9, 1980 (age 46) Seoul, South Korea
- Height: 175 cm (5 ft 9 in)
- Weight: 74 kg (163 lb)

Sport
- Country: South Korea
- Sport: Short track speed skating
- Retired: 2005

Achievements and titles
- World finals: World Championship; 2002 Overall; 1997 Overall; World Cup; 2001–02 Overall; 1998–99 Overall
- Personal bests: 500 m: 41.527 (2001); 1000 m: 1:27.307 (1999); 1500 m: 2:15.685 (2000); 3000 m: 4:46.727 (1998)
Medal record
Men's short track speed skating
Representing South Korea
Event	1st	2nd	3rd
Olympic Games	1	1	0
World Championships	11	4	3
World Team Championships	1	3	1
Asian Games	3	3	2
Olympic Games
Gold medal – first place	1998 Nagano	1000 m
Silver medal – second place	1998 Nagano	5000 m relay
World Championships
Gold medal – first place	1997 Nagano	Overall
Gold medal – first place	1997 Nagano	1000 m
Gold medal – first place	1997 Nagano	3000 m
Gold medal – first place	1997 Nagano	5000 m relay
Gold medal – first place	1998 Vienna	3000 m
Gold medal – first place	2002 Montréal	Overall
Gold medal – first place	2002 Montréal	500 m
Gold medal – first place	2002 Montréal	1000 m
Gold medal – first place	2002 Montréal	1500 m
Gold medal – first place	2002 Montréal	3000 m
Gold medal – first place	2002 Montréal	5000 m relay
Silver medal – second place	1997 Nagano	500 m
Silver medal – second place	1998 Vienna	5000 m relay
Silver medal – second place	1999 Sofia	1000 m
Silver medal – second place	1999 Sofia	5000 m relay
Bronze medal – third place	1996 The Hague	5000 m relay
Bronze medal – third place	1998 Vienna	Overall
Bronze medal – third place	1998 Vienna	1500 m
World Team Championships
Gold medal – first place	1997 Seoul	Team
Silver medal – second place	1996 Lake Placid	Team
Silver medal – second place	1998 Bormio	Team
Silver medal – second place	2000 The Hague	Team
Bronze medal – third place	2002 Milwaukee	Team
Asian Winter Games
Gold medal – first place	1996 Harbin	5000 m relay
Gold medal – first place	1999 Gangwon	1500 m
Gold medal – first place	1999 Gangwon	3000 m
Silver medal – second place	1996 Harbin	500 m
Silver medal – second place	1996 Harbin	3000 m
Silver medal – second place	1999 Gangwon	1000 m
Bronze medal – third place	1996 Harbin	1000 m
Bronze medal – third place	1999 Gangwon	5000 m relay
World Junior Championships
Gold medal – first place	1997 Marquette	Overall
Gold medal – first place	1997 Marquette	500 m
Gold medal – first place	1997 Marquette	1000 m
Gold medal – first place	1997 Marquette	1500 m
Gold medal – first place	1997 Marquette	1500 m S.F

Kim Dong-Sung (Korean: 김동성; Hanja: 金東聖, born 9 February 1980) is a South Korean former short track speed skater. He won a gold medal in 1000m race and silver medal in 5000m relay at the 1998 Winter Olympics. He has been a two-time Overall World Champion in 1997 and in 2002 and two-time Overall World Cup Champion (1999-2000, 2001-2002).

== Early life ==
Kim Dong-sung was born in Seoul, the third of three children of Kim Tae-young and his wife Yoo Young-hee. Kim started skating and competing in long track when he was seven years old, but switched to short track two years later.

== Career ==
=== Early career ===
In February 1996, Kim was first called up to the South Korean national team and made his senior debut at the Asian Winter Games in Harbin, China at the age of 16, where he won the gold medal in the men's 5000 metre relay together with Olympic champions Chae Ji-hoon and Song Jae-kun, and three medals in the individual events. In March 1996, Kim also made his first appearance at the World Championships in The Hague, where he won bronze as a member of the 5000 metre relay team.

=== 1996–1997 season ===
==== World Junior Championships ====
In January 1997, Kim competed in the World Junior Short Track Speed Skating Championships held in Marquette, Michigan. In the tourney, Kim won all five events (overall, 500 m, 1000 m, 1500 m, 1500 m super final), easily dominating all other competitors including Rusty Smith, François-Louis Tremblay and Dan Weinstein every race. Kim set two world junior records at the championships. On January 11, he broke the 500 m world junior record, recording a time of 43.491 seconds. Next day, Kim would set another world junior record in the 1500 m super final, skating the 1500 m in 2:19.828.

World Junior Championships Record
1997 World Junior Championships – Overall Champion
Year	Overall	500 m	1000 m	1500 m	Super Final
1997	Winner	Gold medal	Gold medal	Gold medal	Gold medal

==== World Championships ====
Two months after winning the overall world junior championship title, Kim competed in the World Championships in Nagano as a member of the South Korean senior national team. Kim then won his first overall world championship title clinching gold in the 1000 metres, 3000 metres and 5000 metre relay. Kim became the first short track speed skater to win the overall world championship titles both at junior and senior levels in the same year. A week after the World Championships in Nagano, Kim added another world championship gold medal at the World Short Track Speed Skating Team Championships in Seoul as a key member of the South Korean national squad.

World Championships Record
1997 World Championships – Overall Champion
Year	Overall	500 m	1000 m	1500 m	3000 m	Relay
1997	Winner	Silver medal	Gold medal	DQ	Gold medal	Gold medal

=== 1997–1998 season ===
==== Winter Olympics ====
Kim began to be hampered with knee problems after the 1997 World Championships, which caused him to miss most of the 1997–1998 season. In February 1998, a year after winning the overall world championship title, Kim competed in the 1998 Winter Olympics in Nagano as a favorite. While he met disappointment in the 500 metres, he won the gold medal in the 1000 metres. After trailing Li Jiajun of China at the final corner of the last lap in the 1000 m final race, Kim stuck out his foot to get his blade to cross the line first, catching Li off-guard by 0.053 seconds. He also helped the Korean team to win the silver medal in the 5000 metre relay.

=== 1998–1999 season ===
After the Nagano Olympics, Kim underwent his first arthroscopic surgery and was sidelined for the better half of a year. Kim came back from injury for the third race of the 1998–1999 World Cup in Zoetermeer, where he finished first overall winning gold in the 500 metres, 1500 metres and 5000 metre relay. Kim continued to dominate at the fourth race in Székesfehérvár and fifth race in Nobeyama, placing first overall in both with five individual gold medals (one in 1000 m, two in 1500 m, two in 3000 m). Kim, however, had controversial disqualifications in the quarterfinals of the 500 metres and 1000 metres at the final World Cup race in Beijing, China. Since Kim earned 75 points and Li Jiajun was 2 points behind Kim in the overall standings before the Beijing race, Korean media said the disqualification decisions were completely biased toward the Chinese skater for his overall title. Li eventually won the overall 1998–1999 World Cup title and Kim would have to settle for third spot on the overall podium. Ironically, a month after the Beijing World Cup, Li Jiajun did not make any individual medal at the 1999 Winter Asian Games in Gangwon, South Korea, controversially disqualified as well in the 500 metres and 1500 metres.

=== 1999–2000 season ===
==== World Cup ====
At the first race of the 1999–2000 World Cup in Montreal, Kim won the 500 metres and 1000 metres, ranked first in the overall competition. Kim continued his successful run at the second 1999–2000 World Cup race in Salt Lake City, where he won the overall competition again with five gold medals and one silver finishing on podium in all disciplines. At the third race in Nobeyama, Kim finished second in the overall standings winning the 3000 metres and 5000 meter relay. On December 5, 1999, Kim set two world records on the same day at the fourth World Cup race in Changchun. Kim first set a world record time of 1:27.307 when he finished first in the 1000 m final, and then broke another world record in the 5000 m relay with a time of 6:49.618 as a member of the South Korean relay team. He added one 5000 metre relay gold and one 1000 m bronze at the fifth World Cup race in Gothenburg as well. Thus, Kim won his first overall World Cup title edging out two-time overall champion Li Jiajun.

World Cup Record
1999–2000 World Cup – Overall Champion
Season	Place	Overall	500 m	1000 m	1500 m	3000 m	Relay
1999–2000	Montreal	Gold medal	Gold medal	Gold medal	Silver medal	7th	Silver medal
1999–2000	Salt Lake	Gold medal	Silver medal	Gold medal	Gold medal	Gold medal	Gold medal
1999–2000	Nobeyama	Silver medal	Bronze medal	5th	Silver medal	Gold medal	Gold medal
1999–2000	Changchun	Bronze medal	Silver medal	Gold medal	11th	—	5th
1999–2000	Gothenburg	7th	15th	Bronze medal	11th	7th	Gold medal
1999–2000	Heerenveen	—	—	—	—	—	—
Final		Winner	Runner-up	Winner	Third	—	Winner

-The 3000 metres event at the World Cup was not officially awarded overall.

==== World Championships ====
On March 11, 2000, during the 500 metre semifinals at the 2000 World Championships in Sheffield, Kim and Li Jiajun crashed at the corner and Kim's right shoulder was severely cut by Li's skating blade. With blood spurting from Kim's shoulder onto the ice, he left the ice rink on a stretcher. Kim was subsequently taken to hospital and operated on, which ruled him out for the rest of the tournament.

=== 2000–2001 season ===
After recovering from a shoulder injury the prior season, Kim returned to compete in the 2000–2001 World Cup Series. Kim, however, re-injured his knee during a race and decided to sit out the rest of the season after the third World Cup race in Nobeyama. He then underwent his second arthroscopic surgery since 1998.

=== 2001–2002 season ===
==== World Cup ====
Kim bounced back from injury in the 2001–2002 season. At the first race of the 2001–2002 World Cup in Changchun, he won gold in the 1000 metres, 1500 metres and 5000 metre relay, finishing first in the overall competition. At the second race in Nobeyama, he achieved podium finishes in all six disciplines accumulating gold in the 3000 metres and 5000 metre relays. At the third race of the World Cup in Calgary, He placed first overall and won three gold medals. At the fourth race in Sofia, He won gold in all three individual disciplines of the Olympics (500 m, 1000 m, 1500 m), finishing first in the overall competition again. Kim eventually secured his second overall World Cup title at the last race of the season in Amsterdam, where he finished second overall with the 1500 metre gold.

World Cup Record
2001–2002 World Cup – Overall Champion
Season	Place	Overall	500 m	1000 m	1500 m	3000 m	Relay
2001–2002	Changchun	Gold medal	4th	Gold medal	Gold medal	Silver medal	Gold medal
2001–2002	Nobeyama	Silver medal	Bronze medal	Silver medal	Silver medal	Gold medal	Gold medal
2001–2002	Calgary	Gold medal	Gold medal	Silver medal	Gold medal	Gold medal	Bronze medal
2001–2002	Sofia	Gold medal	Gold medal	Gold medal	Gold medal	Silver medal	4th
2001–2002	Amsterdam	Silver medal	4th	5th	Gold medal	Bronze medal	Gold medal
Final		Winner	Runner-up	Winner	Winner	—	Winner

-The 3000 metres event at the World Cup was not officially awarded overall.

==== Winter Olympics ====
Kim made a good recovery through the 2001–02 World Cup Series and was highly expected to win multiple medals at the 2002 Winter Olympics in Salt Lake City. Despite being ranked first in the world for all three Olympic disciplines, Kim ended up being shut out of medals at the Olympics. Controversy surrounded his disqualification at the 1500-metre race, where he crossed the line first in the final but was then disqualified for allegedly blocking Apolo Ohno. Many skating fans felt that Ohno made an exaggerated show to feign being blocked when Ohno realized he wouldn't win otherwise as Kim was then in first place with 0.5 laps left. South Korean media accused Ohno of simulating foul, popularizing the term "Hollywood action" in Korea. The Korean Olympic Committee took the protest to the Court of Arbitration for Sport after an initial appeal to the International Skating Union had been rejected, but the arbitration panel finally dismissed South Korea's appeal of the disqualification of Kim. The South Korean delegation threatened to boycott the Olympic closing ceremony to protest what they believed was biased refereeing. The incident provoked anti-American sentiment among South Koreans.

Ohno was also seen trying to push Kim off course by pushing Kim on the hip with the right hand from behind, which was inexplicably never penalized by the judge.

In Ohno's autobiography, Zero Regrets: Be Greater Than Yesterday, Ohno wrote, "Kim came up to me after one of the races and said, in English, 'You're number one. You are the best.'" Kim denied that in his appearance on the 6 June 2012 episode of MBC's weekly talk show Radio Star. According to Kim, Ohno approached Kim and asked to have a photo taken together, then Ohno subsequently lied in his autobiography.

==== World Championships ====
A month later, Kim won all possible six gold medals in the men's category at the 2002 World Short Track Speed Skating Championships (overall, 500 m, 1000 m, 1500 m, 3000 m, 5000 m relay), a feat achieved by no other man in the history of the competition. Though Canada's Sylvie Daigle achieved the same feat in the women's sport at the 1983 World Championships in Tokyo, no World Championship title was awarded for relays that year. In particular, he astounded spectators and competitors alike when he sprinted ahead during the 1500 m final race and retained his speed throughout, eventually winning the gold by finishing one and a half lap before his competitors. He also showed a remarkable comeback in the 5000 metre relay, after Ahn Hyun-soo fell over with four laps to go, by regaining a 20-metre gap between the Canadian team and the Korean team to seize the gold medal by 0.005 seconds. Kim posted a thread on one of Korean online communities the reason why he made such gap. Kim said, "I wanted to compete against Ohno in the World Championships to prove Ohno made the 'Hollywood action,' but he didn't participate in it. Annoyed with that, I just ran towards the goal whether or not other competitors were disqualified due to the gap."

World Championships Record
2002 World Championships – Overall Champion
Year	Overall	500 m	1000 m	1500 m	3000 m	Relay
2002	Winner	Gold medal	Gold medal	Gold medal	Gold medal	Gold medal

=== Retirement ===
Upon graduation from Korea University in early 2002, Kim signed a contract with the Dongducheon City Sports Club. However, he was continually hampered by knee problems and did not race for another year as a result of the third arthroscopic surgery. Kim competed in domestic competitions sporadically in 2003 and 2004, but finally announced his retirement in 2005 due to a chronic knee injury.

== Post-career ==
After retiring, Kim moved to the U.S. and started his coaching career in Virginia and Maryland. In February 2011, The Washington Post reported that six skaters said Kim abused them or they saw Kim inflict corporal punishment on other skaters. U.S. Speedskating investigated Kim and the board concluded it did not have enough evidence to take legal action; the alleged victims never called the police. Kim strongly denied hitting or abusing any skater through local media, and 32 parents at his club defended him, saying the charges had been manufactured by parents and coaches motivated by financial disputes or jealous of Kim's success in the local area. "I have never physically punished my students," Kim said in an interview with Yonhap News Agency. "If that had happened over here, it should've been a matter of police investigation, not suspension." In the meantime, Kim started a private club not sanctioned by U.S. Speedskating in Washington D.C. Despite the lack of concrete evidence, however, U.S. Speedskating subsequently suspended his coaching credentials and membership. Kim was reinstated in August 2011 when the Maryland Child Protective Services in Montgomery County finally turned down the legal charges against Kim that U.S. Speedskating brought. A series of exhausting confrontations and unfavorable local media reports left him frustrated and he finally came back to South Korea in November 2011. However, U.S. Speedskating continued to investigate and imposed a lifetime ban on Kim, but the American Arbitration Association reduced the ban to six years in May 2012.

Kim is currently serving as a short track speed skating commentator for KBS.

== See also ==
- World Short Track Championships - Gold Medal Sweeps
