= Yongpyong Dome =

Sports venue in South Korea

Pyeongchang Dome
- 평창돔
- Yongpyong Dome; Yongpyong Indoor Ice Rink
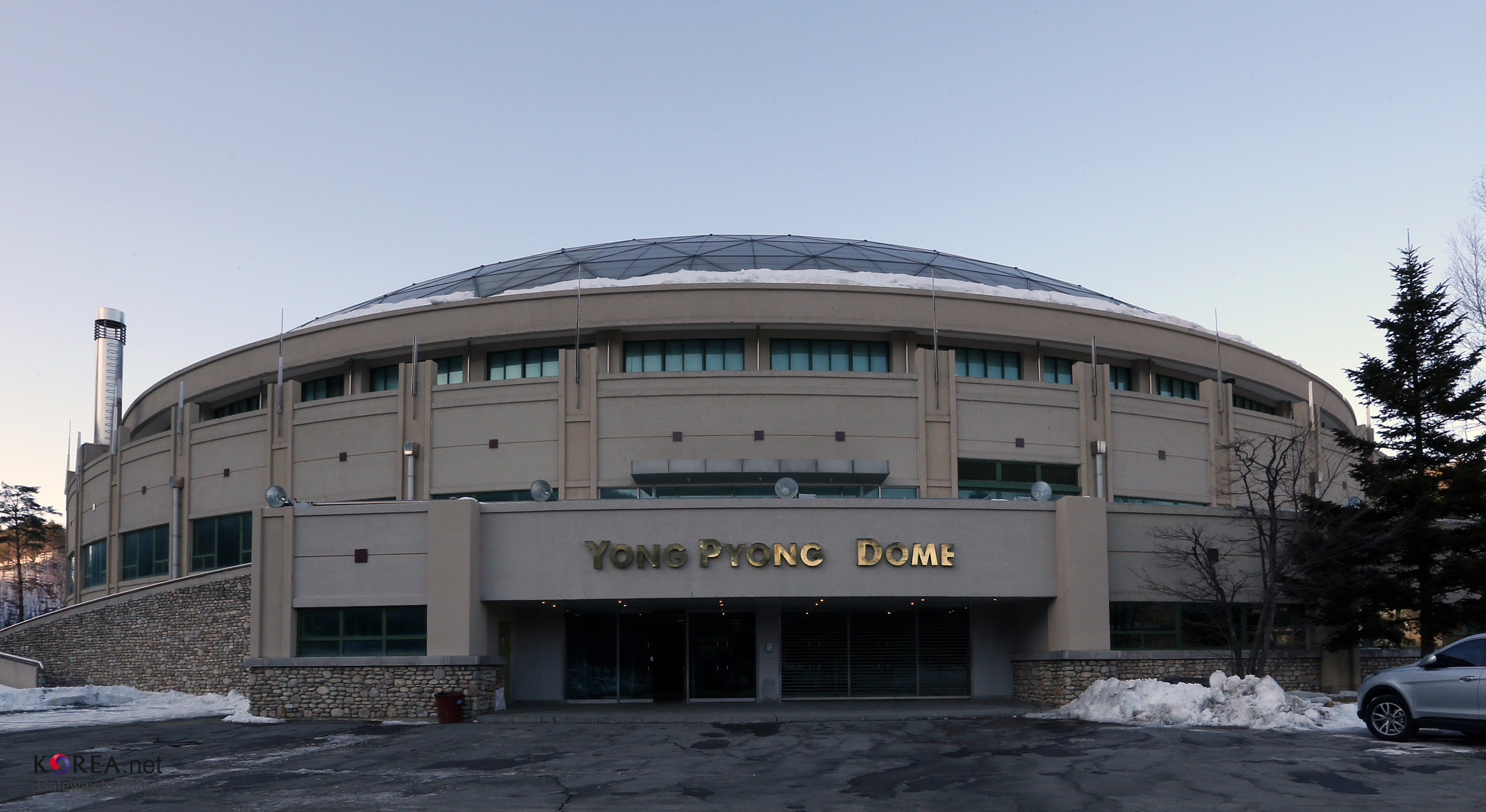
- Yongpyong Dome
- Interactive map of Pyeongchang Dome
- Location: Daegwallyeong-myeon, Pyeongchang-gun, Gangwon-do, South Korea
- Coordinates: 37°39′29″N 128°41′46″E
- Owner: Pyeongchang County
- Surface: Ice

Construction
- Opened: 1998
- Builder: Ssangyong

Website
- www.yongpyong.co.kr/eng/group/group.do

Pyeongchang Dome (Korean: 평창돔) or Yongpyong Dome (Korean: 용평돔) or Yongpyong Indoor Ice Rink (Korean: 용평실내빙상경기장) is an indoor stadium in Daegwallyeong-myeon, Pyeongchang-gun, Gangwon-do, South Korea. Completed in 1998, the stadium was constructed by Ssangyong, the then owner of Yongpyong Resort where the stadium belonged. It was originally built as the main stadium for the 1999 Asian Winter Games. At the games, it was the venue for the opening ceremonies, closing ceremonies, figure skating and short track speed skating events. It was also the main stadium for the 2013 Special Olympics World Winter Games. It is the only international standard indoor stadium in Pyeongchang.

Next to the stadium, Pyeongchang Olympic Village, the main Olympic Village for the 2018 Winter Olympics is located. The stadium was used as the main dining and convenience hall during the Winter Olympics.

In 2020, the Pyeongchang county acquired its ownership from Yongpyong Resort. After the acquisition, the county renamed it to the PyeongChang Dome.
