= Li Jiajun =

Chinese short track speed skater

Personal information
- Born: 15 October 1975 (age 51)

Sport
- Country: China
- Sport: Short track speed skating
Medal record
Men's short track speed skating
Representing China
Event	1st	2nd	3rd
Olympic Games	0	2	3
World Championships	12	4	7
World Team Championships	2	1	2
Olympic Games
Silver medal – second place	1998 Nagano	1000m
Silver medal – second place	2002 Salt Lake City	1500m
Bronze medal – third place	1998 Nagano	5000m relay
Bronze medal – third place	2002 Salt Lake City	5000m relay
Bronze medal – third place	2006 Turin	1500m
World Championships
Gold medal – first place	1996 The Hague	1000 m
Gold medal – first place	1999 Sofia	Overall
Gold medal – first place	1999 Sofia	500 m
Gold medal – first place	1999 Sofia	3000 m
Gold medal – first place	1999 Sofia	5000m relay
Gold medal – first place	2000 Sheffield	1000 m
Gold medal – first place	2000 Sheffield	5000m relay
Gold medal – first place	2001 Jeonju	Overall
Gold medal – first place	2001 Jeonju	500 m
Gold medal – first place	2001 Jeonju	1000 m
Gold medal – first place	2003 Warsaw	500 m
Gold medal – first place	2003 Warsaw	1000 m
Silver medal – second place	2000 Sheffield	3000 m
Silver medal – second place	2003 Warsaw	Overall
Silver medal – second place	2004 Gothenburg	1000 m
Silver medal – second place	2004 Gothenburg	5000m relay
Bronze medal – third place	1998 Vienna	5000m relay
Bronze medal – third place	1999 Sofia	1500 m
Bronze medal – third place	2000 Sheffield	Overall
Bronze medal – third place	2001 Jeonju	5000m relay
Bronze medal – third place	2003 Warsaw	5000m relay
Bronze medal – third place	2004 Gothenburg	Overall
Bronze medal – third place	2005 Beijing	1000 m
World Team Championships
Gold medal – first place	1999 St. Louis	Team
Gold medal – first place	2002 Milwaukee	Team
Silver medal – second place	2001 Nobeyama	Team
Bronze medal – third place	2003 Sofia	Team
Bronze medal – third place	2005 Chuncheon	Team
Asian Winter Games
Gold medal – first place	1996 Harbin	500 m
Gold medal – first place	1996 Harbin	1500 m
Goodwill Games
Bronze medal – third place	2000	1000 m

Li Jiajun (Chinese: 李佳军; pinyin: Lǐ Jiājūn; born October 15, 1975, in Changchun, Jilin) is a former Chinese short track speed skater who has won 5 Olympic medals – two silver and three bronze. He was the overall world champion in 1999 and 2001.

== Career ==
In 1998 Winter Olympics, he led for much of the way during the final race of the 1000m, but was edged out at the finish-line by Korea's Kim Dong-Sung, to win a silver medal. He also won a bronze medal in 5000m relay.

He participated in the 2002 Winter Olympics at Salt Lake City, making the finals of the 1000 meter short course event but failed to win a medal after being disqualified following a collision with Apolo Ohno, which caused Ahn Hyun-Soo and Mathieu Turcotte to also fall and allowed Australian Steven Bradbury to claim the gold medal.

During the opening ceremony of the 2007 Asian Winter Games, Li was given the honour to light the torch. As of August 18, 2006, he officially retired from short track speedskating. According to Li, he went to study in Canada later that year and continued his work as the assistant coach for the national team.
