= Feng Kai =

Chinese short track speed skater

Personal information
- Born: 28 August 1978 (age 48)

Sport
- Country: China
- Sport: Short track speed skating
Medal record
Men's short track speed skating
Representing China
Olympic Games
Bronze medal – third place	1998 Nagano	5000 m relay
Bronze medal – third place	2002 Salt Lake City	5000 m relay
World Championships
Gold medal – first place	1998 Vienna	500 m
Gold medal – first place	1999 Sofia	5000 m relay
Gold medal – first place	2000 Sheffield	5000 m relay
Bronze medal – third place	1997 Nagano	1000 m
Bronze medal – third place	1998 Vienna	5000 m relay
Bronze medal – third place	2001 Jeonju	5000 m relay
World Team Championships
Gold medal – first place	1999 St. Louis	Team
Silver medal – second place	2001 Minamimaki	Team

Feng Kai (simplified Chinese: 冯凯; traditional Chinese: 馮凱; pinyin: Féng Kǎi; born 28 August 1978, in Changchun, Jilin) is a Chinese short track speed skater, who won bronze medals in the 5000 m relay at the 1998 and 2002 Winter Olympics.
