= An Yulong =

Short-track speed skater

Medal record

Men's short track speed skating

Representing China

Olympic Games
Silver medal – second place	1998 Nagano	500 m
Bronze medal – third place	1998 Nagano	5000 m relay
Bronze medal – third place	2002 Salt Lake City	5000 m relay

World Championships
Gold medal – first place	1999 Sofia	5000 m relay
Gold medal – first place	2000 Sheffield	5000 m relay
Silver medal – second place	2000 Sheffield	1000 m
Bronze medal – third place	1998 Vienna	5000 m relay
Bronze medal – third place	2001 Jeonju	5000 m relay

World Team Championships
Gold medal – first place	1999 St. Louis	Team
Silver medal – second place	2001 Nobeyama	Team

Goodwill Games
Silver medal – second place	2000 Lake Placid	1000 m

An Yulong (simplified Chinese: 安玉龙; traditional Chinese: 安玉龍; pinyin: Ān Yùlóng; born 23 July 1978) is a Chinese short track speed skater, who won medals in the 500 m and 5000 m relay at the 1998 Winter Olympics. He also skated for the bronze medal-winning relay team at the 2002 Winter Olympics.
