= China at the 1999 Asian Winter Games =

- IOC code: CHN
- NOC: Chinese Olympic Committee external link (in Chinese and English)

in Gangwon
- Competitors: 147
- Medals Ranked 1st: Gold 15 Silver 10 Bronze 11 Total 36

Asian Winter Games appearances
- 1986; 1990; 1996; 1999; 2003; 2007; 2011; 2017; 2025; 2029

China competed in the 1999 Asian Winter Games which were held in the province of Kangwon, South Korea from January 30, 1999 to February 6, 1999. It won 15 gold, 10 silver and 11 bronze medals.

== See also ==
- China at the Asian Games
- China at the Olympics
- Sports in China
