= Yang Yang (speed skater, born 1977) =

Chinese speed skater

Yang Yang (杨阳)
Personal information
- Born: 14 September 1977 (age 48) Changchun, Jilin, China

Sport
- Country: China
- Sport: Speed skating
- Retired: 2002
Medal record
Women's short track speed skating
Representing China
Event	1st	2nd	3rd
Olympic Games	0	4	1
World Championships	6	5	6
World Team Championships	4	1	0
Olympic Games
Silver medal – second place	1998 Nagano	500 m
Silver medal – second place	1998 Nagano	3000 m relay
Silver medal – second place	1998 Nagano	1000 m
Silver medal – second place	2002 Salt Lake City	3000 m relay
Bronze medal – third place	2002 Salt Lake City	1000 m
World Championships
Gold medal – first place	1995 Gjovik	3000 m relay
Gold medal – first place	1998 Vienna	3000 m relay
Gold medal – first place	1999 Sofia	1500 m
Gold medal – first place	1999 Sofia	3000 m relay
Gold medal – first place	2000 Sheffield	3000 m relay
Gold medal – first place	2001 Jeonju	3000 m relay
Silver medal – second place	1996 The Hague	3000 m relay
Silver medal – second place	1999 Sofia	1000 m
Silver medal – second place	1999 Sofia	Overall
Silver medal – second place	2000 Sheffield	500 m
Silver medal – second place	2000 Sheffield	1000 m
Bronze medal – third place	1997 Nagano	1500 m
Bronze medal – third place	1999 Sofia	500 m
Bronze medal – third place	1999 Sofia	3000 m
Bronze medal – third place	2000 Sheffield	Overall
Bronze medal – third place	2001 Jeonju	500 m
Bronze medal – third place	2001 Jeonju	1000 m
World Team Championships
Gold medal – first place	1998 Bormio	Team
Gold medal – first place	1999 Milwaukee	Team
Gold medal – first place	2000 The Hague	Team
Gold medal – first place	2001 Nobeyama	Team
Silver medal – second place	1995 Zoetermeer	Team
Asian Winter Games
Gold medal – first place	1996 Harbin	3000 m relay
Bronze medal – third place	1996 Harbin	500 m

Yang Yang (Chinese: 杨阳; pinyin: Yáng Yáng; born 14 September 1977 in Changchun, Jilin, China) is a Chinese Olympic speed skater of Hui ethnicity.

Yang competed as a short track speed skater for the Chinese national team at the 1994 Winter Olympics, the 1998 Winter Olympics, and the 2002 Winter Olympics.

Born 1977, Yang is sometimes known as Yang Yang (S), to differentiate her from the speed skater named Yang Yang born in 1976 (known as "Yang Yang (A)").

By coincidence, Yang had a one-year and one month older contemporary on the Chinese short track team also named Yang Yang in English and pinyin, although with a different given name in Chinese characters. They were originally referred to as Yang Yang (L) ("大杨扬") and Yang Yang (S) ("小杨阳"), for "Large" and "Small"; Yang Yang (L) disliked the "L" designation and changed her designation to Yang Yang (A). "A" and "S" also refer to their respective months of birth: August and September respectively.
