= 1999 Asian Winter Games =

Multi-sport event in Gangwon, South Korea

IV Asian Winter Games
- Host city: Kangwon Province, South Korea
- Motto: Asia, Shining brightly through Everlasting Friendship
- Nations: 14
- Athletes: 799
- Events: 43 in 4 sports
- Opening: January 30, 1999
- Closing: February 6, 1999
- Opened by: Kim Dae-jung; President of South Korea
- Torch lighter: Yoo Sun-hee
- Main venue: Yongpyong Indoor Ice Rink
- Website: kangwonasiad.or.kr (Archived)

Summer

Winter

The 4th Asian Winter Games (Korean: 제4회 동계 아시안 게임), also known as Kangwon 1999 (강원 1999), were held from January 30 to February 6, 1999, in the province of Kangwon (now Gangwon), South Korea. The games were staged in three different clusters in the province which were Yongpyong, Kangnung (Gangneung) and Chunchon (Chuncheon). The name Yongpyong was derived from the Yongpyong Resort.

On December 2, 1993, the Olympic Council of Asia announced that South Korea would host the 4th Asian Winter Games in 1999. South Korea initially aimed to host the previous games in 1996 but lost the voting process and awarded the 1999 edition instead.

== Development and preparations ==
=== Marketing ===
==== Mascot ====
Gomdori, the official mascot of the games

The 1999 Winter Asiad mascot is Gomdori (곰돌이), a half-moon black bear cub.

=== Venues ===
==== Yongpyong ====
- Yongpyong Resort – Alpine skiing and organizing committee
- Yongpyong Indoor Ice Rink – Short track speed skating, figure skating, opening and closing ceremonies
- Provincial nordic venue – Cross-country skiing and Biathlon

==== Kangnung (Gangneung) ====
- Kangnung Indoor Ice Rink – Ice hockey

==== Chunchon (Chuncheon) ====
- Chunchon Outdoor Ice Rink – Speed skating

== Games ==
=== Sports ===
A total of 43 medal events in seven sports were played in the Fourth Winter Asian Games. Freestyle skiing was removed from the program while two more events were added to alpine skiing.

- Alpine skiing (6)
- Biathlon (6)
- Cross-country skiing (6)
- Figure skating (4)
- Ice hockey (2)
- Short-track speed skating (10)
- Speed skating (9)

=== Participating National Olympic Committees ===
Names are arranged in alphabetical order. A total of 14 Asian NOCs sent delegations, with those that sent only officials.

- China (147)
- Chinese Taipei (11)
- Hong Kong (4)
- India (8)
- Iran (11)
- Japan (101)
- Kazakhstan (74)
- Kuwait
- Kyrgyzstan (1)
- Lebanon (2)
- Mongolia
- Pakistan (2)
- South Korea (102)
- Uzbekistan (7)

Non-competing nations

- Bhutan
- Macau
- Nepal
- Philippines
- Singapore
- Sri Lanka
- Tajikistan
- Vietnam

== Calendar ==
●	Opening ceremony	Event competitions	●	Event finals	●	Closing ceremony

January / February 1999	30th Sat	31st Sun	1st Mon	2nd Tue	3rd Wed	4th Thu	5th Fri	6th Sat	Gold medals
Alpine skiing		1	1	1	1	1	1		6
Biathlon			2		2		2		6
Cross-country skiing		1	1	1	1	1	1		6
Figure Skating						1	3		4
Ice hockey						1		1	2
Short-track speed skating		4	6						10
Speed skating				2	2	2	3		9
Total gold medals		6	10	4	6	6	10	1	43
Ceremonies	●							●	
January / February 1999	30th Sat	31st Sun	1st Mon	2nd Tue	3rd Wed	4th Thu	5th Fri	6th Sat	Gold medals

== Medal table ==
* Host nation (South Korea)

Rank	Nation	Gold	Silver	Bronze	Total
1	China	15	10	11	36
2	South Korea*	11	10	14	35
3	Kazakhstan	10	8	7	25
4	Japan	6	14	9	29
5	Uzbekistan	1	1	1	3
Totals (5 entries)		43	43	42	128

== See also ==
- 1997 Winter Universiade
- 2013 Special Olympics World Winter Games
- 2018 Winter Olympics
- 2024 Winter Youth Olympics

Preceded by Harbin	Asian Winter Games; Kangwon; IV Asian Winter Games (1999)	Succeeded by Aomori
