= 2002–03 ISU Short Track Speed Skating World Cup =

International speed skating competition

ISU Short Track World Cup
- Dates: 18 October 2002 – 16 February 2003

The 2002–03 ISU Short Track Speed Skating World Cup was a multi-race tournament over a season for short track speed skating. The season began on 18 October 2002 and ended on 16 February 2003. The World Cup was organised by the International Skating Union who also ran world cups and championships in speed skating and figure skating.

The World Cup consisted of six tournaments in this season.

== Calendar ==
=== Men ===
==== Korea ====
Date	Place	Distance	Winner	Second	Third
18 October 2002	(South Korea) Chuncheon	1500m	(South Korea) Ahn Hyun-soo	(Italy) Fabio Carta	(South Korea) Oh Se-jong
19 October 2002	(South Korea) Chuncheon	500m	(South Korea) Ahn Hyun-soo	(China) Liu Yingbao	(Italy) Nicola Franceschina
20 October 2002	(South Korea) Chuncheon	1000m	(South Korea) Ahn Hyun-soo	(South Korea) Yeo Jun-hyung	(Canada) François-Louis Tremblay
20 October 2002	(South Korea) Chuncheon	3000m	(South Korea) Ahn Hyun-soo	(South Korea) Oh Se-jong	(Canada) Mathieu Turcotte
20 October 2002	(South Korea) Chuncheon	5000m relay	Canada	China	Japan

==== China ====
Date	Place	Distance	Winner	Second	Third
25 October 2002	(China) Beijing	1500m	(Italy) Fabio Carta	(South Korea) Ahn Hyun-soo	(South Korea) Lee Seung-Jae
26 October 2002	(China) Beijing	500m	(Canada) François-Louis Tremblay	(China) Li Jiajun	(South Korea) Song Suk-woo
27 October 2002	(China) Beijing	1000m	(Italy) Fabio Carta	(South Korea) Lee Seung-jae	(Italy) Nicola Franceschina
27 October 2002	(China) Beijing	3000m	(South Korea) Lee Seung-jae	(South Korea) Ahn Hyun-soo	(Canada) François-Louis Tremblay
27 October 2002	(China) Beijing	5000m relay	Canada	Italy	Japan

==== Russia ====
Date	Place	Distance	Winner	Second	Third
29 November 2002	(Russia) Saint Petersburg	1500m	(United States) Apolo Anton Ohno	(South Korea) Ahn Hyun-soo	(Canada) Mathieu Turcotte
30 November 2002	(Russia) Saint Petersburg	500m	(China) Li Jiajun	(Canada) Jean-François Monette	(South Korea) Lee Seung-Jae
1 December 2002	(Russia) Saint Petersburg	1000m	(China) Li Jiajun	(United States) Apolo Anton Ohno	(Canada) Jean-François Monette
1 December 2002	(Russia) Saint Petersburg	3000m	(United States) Apolo Anton Ohno	(South Korea) Ahn Hyun-soo	(South Korea) Lee Seung-Jae
1 December 2002	(Russia) Saint Petersburg	5000m relay	China	Canada	South Korea

==== Italy ====
Date	Place	Distance	Winner	Second	Third
6 December 2002	(Italy) Bormio	1500m	(United States) Apolo Anton Ohno	(Canada) Jean-François Monette	(Canada) Jonathan Guilmette
7 December 2002	(Italy) Bormio	500m	(Italy) Fabio Carta	(Italy) Nicola Rodigari	(Italy) Nicola Franceschina
8 December 2002	(Italy) Bormio	1000m	(United States) Apolo Anton Ohno	(South Korea) Ahn Hyun-soo	(Canada) Jean-François Monette
8 December 2002	(Italy) Bormio	3000m	(South Korea) Ahn Hyun-soo	(United States) Apolo Anton Ohno	(Canada) Jean-François Monette
8 December 2002	(Italy) Bormio	5000m relay	Canada	Italy	Germany

==== United States ====
Date	Place	Distance	Winner	Second	Third
7 February 2003	(United States) Salt Lake City	1500m	(China) Sui Baoku	(Canada) Jeff Scholten	(Canada) François-Louis Tremblay
8 February 2003	(United States) Salt Lake City	500m	(Canada) Jeff Scholten	(Canada) Jean-François Monette	(Canada) François-Louis Tremblay
9 February 2003	(United States) Salt Lake City	1000m	(United States) Apolo Anton Ohno	(Canada) Jeff Scholten	(Canada) François-Louis Tremblay
9 February 2003	(United States) Salt Lake City	3000m	(United States) Apolo Anton Ohno	(China) Sui Baoku	(Canada) Jean-François Monette
9 February 2003	(United States) Salt Lake City	5000m relay	Canada	United States	China

==== Canada ====
Date	Place	Distance	Winner	Second	Third
14 February 2003	(Canada) Saguenay	1500m	(China) Li Jiajun	(United States) Apolo Anton Ohno	(Canada) Jonathan Guilmette
15 February 2003	(Canada) Saguenay	500m	(Canada) Jonathan Guilmette	(United States) Apolo Anton Ohno	(South Korea) Lee Seung-jae
16 February 2003	(Canada) Saguenay	1000m	(China) Li Jiajun	(South Korea) Lee Seung-jae	(United States) Apolo Anton Ohno
16 February 2003	(Canada) Saguenay	3000m	(Canada) Jonathan Guilmette	(China) Li Jiajun	(South Korea) Lee Seung-jae
16 February 2003	(Canada) Saguenay	5000m relay	China	Canada	United States

=== Women ===
==== Korea ====
Date	Place	Distance	Winner	Second	Third
18 October 2002	(South Korea) Chuncheon	1500m	(South Korea) Choi Eun-kyung	(China) Liu Xiaoying	(Bulgaria) Evgenia Radanova
19 October 2002	(South Korea) Chuncheon	500m	(South Korea) Joo Min-jin	(China) Wang Chunlu	(China) Wang Meng
20 October 2002	(South Korea) Chuncheon	1000m	(South Korea) Choi Eun-kyung	(China) Liu Xiaoying	(South Korea) Cho Ha-ri
20 October 2002	(South Korea) Chuncheon	3000m	(South Korea) Choi Eun-kyung	(Bulgaria) Evgenia Radanova	(China) Fu Tianyu
20 October 2002	(South Korea) Chuncheon	5000m relay	South Korea	China	Canada

==== China ====
Date	Place	Distance	Winner	Second	Third
25 October 2002	(China) Beijing	1500m	(South Korea) Choi Eun-kyung	(South Korea) Cho Ha-ri	(China) Wang Meng
26 October 2002	(China) Beijing	500m	(Bulgaria) Evgenia Radanova	(China) Fu Tianyu	(China) Wang Meng
27 October 2002	(China) Beijing	1000m	(South Korea) Choi Eun-kyung	(China) Fu Tianyu	(China) Wang Meng
27 October 2002	(China) Beijing	3000m	(South Korea) Choi Eun-kyung	(Canada) Amélie Goulet-Nadon	(South Korea) Cho Ha-ri
27 October 2002	(China) Beijing	3000m relay	China	Canada	South Korea

==== Russia ====
Date	Place	Distance	Winner	Second	Third
29 November 2002	(Russia) Saint Petersburg	1500m	(China) Yang Yang (A)	(Bulgaria) Evgenia Radanova	(South Korea) Cho Ha-ri
30 November 2002	(Russia) Saint Petersburg	500m	(China) Fu Tianyu	(China) Yang Yang (A)	(Canada) Amélie Goulet-Nadon
1 December 2002	(Russia) Saint Petersburg	1000m	(China) Yang Yang (A)	(China) Fu Tianyu	(South Korea) Cho Ha-ri
1 December 2002	(Russia) Saint Petersburg	3000m	(South Korea) Cho Ha-ri	(Bulgaria) Evgenia Radanova	(China) Fu Tianyu
1 December 2002	(Russia) Saint Petersburg	3000m relay	China	South Korea	Canada

==== Italy ====
Date	Place	Distance	Winner	Second	Third
6 December 2002	(Italy) Bormio	1500m	(South Korea) Choi Eun-kyung	(Canada) Amélie Goulet-Nadon	(France) Stephanie Bouvier
7 December 2002	(Italy) Bormio	500m	(Canada) Amélie Goulet-Nadon	(Canada) Alanna Kraus	(Bulgaria) Evgenia Radanova
8 December 2002	(Italy) Bormio	1000m	(South Korea) Choi Eun-kyung	(Bulgaria) Evgenia Radanova	(South Korea) Kim Min-ji
8 December 2002	(Italy) Bormio	3000m	(South Korea) Cho Ha-ri	(South Korea) Choi Eun-kyung	(Canada) Amélie Goulet-Nadon
8 December 2002	(Italy) Bormio	3000m relay	South Korea	Canada	Italy

==== United States ====
Date	Place	Distance	Winner	Second	Third
7 February 2003	(United States) Salt Lake City	1500m	(China) Wang Wei	(Canada) Amélie Goulet-Nadon	(Russia) Nina Evteeva
8 February 2003	(United States) Salt Lake City	500m	(Canada) Amélie Goulet-Nadon	(China) Cheng Xiao Lei	(Canada) Alanna Kraus
9 February 2003	(United States) Salt Lake City	1000m	(China) Wang Wei	(Canada) Amélie Goulet-Nadon	(Canada) Tania Vicent
9 February 2003	(United States) Salt Lake City	3000m	(Canada) Amélie Goulet-Nadon	(China) Wang Wei	(China) Cheng Xiao Lei
9 February 2003	(United States) Salt Lake City	3000m relay	Russia	China	Netherlands

==== Canada ====
Date	Place	Distance	Winner	Second	Third
14 February 2003	(Canada) Saguenay	1500m	(China) Fu Tianyu	(China) Liu Xiaoying	(Canada) Amélie Goulet-Nadon
15 February 2003	(Canada) Saguenay	500m	(China) Wang Meng	(China) Fu Tianyu	(China) Wang Chunlu
16 February 2003	(Canada) Saguenay	1000m	(Canada) Amélie Goulet-Nadon	(China) Wang Meng	(China) Liu Xiaoying
16 February 2003	(Canada) Saguenay	3000m	(China) Fu Tianyu	(Russia) Tatiana Borodulina	(China) Wang Meng
16 February 2003	(Canada) Saguenay	3000m relay	Canada	China	Germany

== Overall standings ==
=== Men ===
Distance	Winner	Second	Third
500m	(Canada) Jean-François Monette	(Canada) François-Louis Tremblay	(South Korea) Ahn Hyun-soo
1000m	(United States) Apolo Anton Ohno	(Canada) Jean-François Monette	(South Korea) Ahn Hyun-soo
1500m	(Italy) Fabio Carta	(South Korea) Ahn Hyun-soo	(United States) Apolo Anton Ohno
5000m relay	Canada	China	Italy
Overall	(United States) Apolo Anton Ohno	(South Korea) Ahn Hyun-soo	(Italy) Fabio Carta

=== Women ===
Distance	Winner	Second	Third
500m	(Canada) Amélie Goulet-Nadon	(Bulgaria) Evgenia Radanova	(Canada) Alanna Kraus
1000m	(Canada) Amélie Goulet-Nadon	(Canada) Alanna Kraus	(Bulgaria) Evgenia Radanova
1500m	(Canada) Amélie Goulet-Nadon	(South Korea) Cho Ha-ri	(Bulgaria) Evgenia Radanova
3000m relay	China	South Korea	Canada
Overall	(China) Fu Tianyu	(Canada) Amélie Goulet-Nadon	(Bulgaria) Evgenia Radanova

== Podium summary ==
Rank	Nation	Gold	Silver	Bronze	Total
1	South Korea (KOR)	19	12	14	45
2	China (CHN)	17	20	11	48
3	Canada (CAN)	13	14	20	47
4	United States (USA)	6	5	2	13
5	Italy (ITA)	3	4	4	11
6	Bulgaria (BUL)	1	4	2	7
7	Russia (RUS)	1	1	1	3
8	Germany (GER)	0	0	2	2
8	Japan (JPN)	0	0	2	2
10	France (FRA)	0	0	1	1
10	Netherlands (NED)	0	0	1	1
Totals (11 entries)		60	60	60	180

== See also ==
- 2003 World Short Track Speed Skating Championships
- 2003 World Short Track Speed Skating Team Championships
- 2003 European Short Track Speed Skating Championships
