= 2003–04 ISU Short Track Speed Skating World Cup =

International speed skating competition

ISU Short Track World Cup
- Dates: 17 October 2003 – 14 February 2004

The 2003–04 ISU Short Track Speed Skating World Cup was a multi-race tournament over a season for short track speed skating. The season began on 17 October 2003 and ended on 14 February 2004. The World Cup was organised by the International Skating Union who also ran world cups and championships in speed skating and figure skating.

The World Cup consisted of six tournaments in this season.

== Calendar ==
=== Men ===
==== Canada ====
Date	Place	Distance	Winner	Second	Third
17 October 2003	(Canada) Calgary	1500m	(South Korea) Lee Seung-jae	(South Korea) Ahn Hyun-soo	(United States) Apolo Anton Ohno
18 October 2003	(Canada) Calgary	500m	(Canada) Jonathan Guilmette	(Canada) Jean-François Monette	(China) Li Ye
19 October 2003	(Canada) Calgary	1000m	(South Korea) Lee Seung-jae	(Canada) Jonathan Guilmette	(South Korea) Ahn Hyun-soo
19 October 2003	(Canada) Calgary	3000m	(South Korea) Lee Seung-jae	(Canada) Jean-François Monette	(South Korea) Ahn Hyun-soo
19 October 2003	(Canada) Calgary	5000m relay	China	Italy	South Korea

==== United States ====
Date	Place	Distance	Winner	Second	Third
24 October 2003	(United States) Marquette	1500m	(South Korea) Ahn Hyun-soo	(Canada) Mathieu Turcotte	(United States) Apolo Anton Ohno
25 October 2003	(United States) Marquette	500m	(United States) Apolo Anton Ohno	(South Korea) Ahn Hyun-soo	(South Korea) Lee Seung-jae
26 October 2003	(United States) Marquette	1000m	(South Korea) Ahn Hyun-soo	(South Korea) Lee Seung-jae	(Canada) Éric Bédard
26 October 2003	(United States) Marquette	3000m	(South Korea) Lee Seung-jae	(Canada) Mathieu Turcotte	(United States) Rusty Smith
26 October 2003	(United States) Marquette	5000m relay	South Korea	Canada	China

==== Korea ====
Date	Place	Distance	Winner	Second	Third
28 November 2003	(South Korea) Jeonju	1500m	(South Korea) Ahn Hyun-soo	(South Korea) Song Suk-woo	(Canada) Jean-François Monette
29 November 2003	(South Korea) Jeonju	500m	(China) Li Jiajun	(Canada) Jonathan Guilmette	(Canada) Jean-François Monette
30 November 2003	(South Korea) Jeonju	1000m	(China) Li Jiajun	(South Korea) Song Suk-woo	(Canada) Mathieu Turcotte
30 November 2003	(South Korea) Jeonju	3000m	(South Korea) Song Suk-woo	(South Korea) Ahn Hyun-soo	(Canada) Jonathan Guilmette
30 November 2003	(South Korea) Jeonju	5000m relay	China	Italy	South Korea

==== China ====
Date	Place	Distance	Winner	Second	Third
5 December 2003	(China) Beijing	1500m	(South Korea) Ahn Hyun-soo	(South Korea) Song Suk-woo	(United States) Apolo Anton Ohno
6 December 2003	(China) Beijing	500m	(South Korea) Song Suk-woo	(Canada) Jeff Scholten	(Japan) Takafumi Nishitani
7 December 2003	(China) Beijing	1000m	(South Korea) Kim Hyun-kon	(South Korea) Ahn Hyun-soo	(Canada) Éric Bédard
7 December 2003	(China) Beijing	3000m	(South Korea) Ahn Hyun-soo	(South Korea) Song Suk-woo	(South Korea) Kim Hyun-kon
7 December 2003	(China) Beijing	5000m relay	China	Canada	South Korea

==== Czech Republic ====
Date	Place	Distance	Winner	Second	Third
6 February 2004	(Czech Republic) Mladá Boleslav	1500m	(South Korea) Ahn Hyun-soo	(United States) Apolo Anton Ohno	(Canada) Jean-François Monette
7 February 2004	(Czech Republic) Mladá Boleslav	500m	(Canada) Jean-François Monette	(South Korea) Song Suk-woo	(China) Li Jiajun
8 February 2004	(Czech Republic) Mladá Boleslav	1000m	(United States) Apolo Anton Ohno	(South Korea) Ahn Hyun-soo	(South Korea) Song Suk-woo
8 February 2004	(Czech Republic) Mladá Boleslav	3000m	(South Korea) Song Suk-woo	(South Korea) Ahn Hyun-soo	(United States) Apolo Anton Ohno
8 February 2004	(Czech Republic) Mladá Boleslav	5000m relay	China	Canada	Italy

==== Italy ====
Date	Place	Distance	Winner	Second	Third
12 February 2004	(Italy) Bormio	1500m	(United States) Apolo Anton Ohno	(South Korea) Song Suk-woo	(Canada) Mathieu Turcotte
13 February 2004	(Italy) Bormio	500m	(Canada) Mathieu Turcotte	(United States) Rusty Smith	(Italy) Nicola Franceschina
14 February 2004	(Italy) Bormio	1000m	(China) Li Jiajun	(Canada) Steve Robillard	(Canada) Charles Hamelin
14 February 2004	(Italy) Bormio	3000m	(United States) Apolo Anton Ohno	(Canada) Steve Robillard	(South Korea) Song Suk-woo
14 February 2004	(Italy) Bormio	5000m relay	Canada	China	United States

=== Women ===
==== Canada ====
Date	Place	Distance	Winner	Second	Third
17 October 2003	(Canada) Calgary	1500m	(South Korea) Byun Chun-sa	(China) Wang Meng	(Bulgaria) Evgenia Radanova
18 October 2003	(Canada) Calgary	500m	(China) Wang Meng	(China) Zhu Mi Lei	(Canada) Amélie Goulet-Nadon
19 October 2003	(Canada) Calgary	1000m	(South Korea) Choi Eun-kyung	(South Korea) Byun Chun-sa	(China) Fu Tianyu
19 October 2003	(Canada) Calgary	3000m	(South Korea) Choi Eun-kyung	(South Korea) Byun Chun-sa	(Bulgaria) Evgenia Radanova
19 October 2003	(Canada) Calgary	5000m relay	South Korea	China	Italy

==== United States ====
Date	Place	Distance	Winner	Second	Third
24 October 2003	(United States) Marquette	1500m	(South Korea) Choi Eun-kyung	(South Korea) Byun Chun-sa	(South Korea) Ko Gi-hyun
25 October 2003	(United States) Marquette	500m	(South Korea) Choi Eun-kyung	(Canada) Amélie Goulet-Nadon	(Bulgaria) Evgenia Radanova
26 October 2003	(United States) Marquette	1000m	(South Korea) Choi Eun-kyung	(Canada) Amélie Goulet-Nadon	(China) Wang Meng
26 October 2003	(United States) Marquette	3000m	(South Korea) Byun Chun-sa	(Canada) Amélie Goulet-Nadon	(South Korea) Choi Eun-kyung
26 October 2003	(United States) Marquette	3000m relay	South Korea	China	Canada

==== Korea ====
Date	Place	Distance	Winner	Second	Third
28 November 2003	(South Korea) Jeonju	1500m	(South Korea) Choi Eun-kyung	(China) Wang Wei	(China) Wang Meng
29 November 2003	(South Korea) Jeonju	500m	(Canada) Amélie Goulet-Nadon	(Russia) Tatiana Borodulina	(China) Fu Tianyu
30 November 2003	(South Korea) Jeonju	1000m	(South Korea) Choi Eun-kyung	(South Korea) Byun Chun-sa	(South Korea) Cho Ha-ri
30 November 2003	(South Korea) Jeonju	3000m	(South Korea) Byun Chun-sa	(South Korea) Choi Eun-kyung	(South Korea) Cho Ha-ri
30 November 2003	(South Korea) Jeonju	3000m relay	South Korea	China	Italy

==== China ====
Date	Place	Distance	Winner	Second	Third
5 December 2003	(China) Beijing	1500m	(South Korea) Byun Chun-sa	(South Korea) Choi Eun-kyung	(South Korea) Ko Gi-hyun
5 December 2003	(China) Beijing	500m	(China) Wang Meng	(China) Fu Tianyu	(Bulgaria) Evgenia Radanova
5 December 2003	(China) Beijing	1000m	(South Korea) Byun Chun-sa	(South Korea) Choi Eun-kyung	(China) Wang Meng
5 December 2003	(China) Beijing	3000m	(South Korea) Choi Eun-kyung	(South Korea) Byun Chun-sa	(China) Wang Meng
5 December 2003	(China) Beijing	3000m relay	South Korea	China	Canada

==== Czech Republic ====
Date	Place	Distance	Winner	Second	Third
6 February 2004	(Czech Republic) Mladá Boleslav	1500m	(South Korea) Choi Eun-kyung	(Italy) Marta Capurso	(China) Cheng Xiao Lei
7 February 2004	(Czech Republic) Mladá Boleslav	500m	(China) Fu Tianyu	(China) Cheng Xiao Lei	(Canada) Alanna Kraus
8 February 2004	(Czech Republic) Mladá Boleslav	1000m	(South Korea) Choi Eun-kyung	(China) Wang Meng	(South Korea) Byun Chun-sa
8 February 2004	(Czech Republic) Mladá Boleslav	3000m	(South Korea) Ko Gi-hyun	(South Korea) Choi Eun-kyung	(South Korea) Byun Chun-sa
8 February 2004	(Czech Republic) Mladá Boleslav	3000m relay	China	Italy	Canada

==== Italy ====
Date	Place	Distance	Winner	Second	Third
12 February 2004	(Italy) Bormio	1500m	(South Korea) Choi Eun-kyung	(South Korea) Kim Min-jee	(China) Wang Meng
13 February 2004	(Italy) Bormio	500m	(China) Fu Tianyu	(China) Wang Meng	(Italy) Marta Capurso
14 February 2004	(Italy) Bormio	1000m	(South Korea) Choi Eun-kyung	(China) Wang Meng	(Italy) Marta Capurso
15 February 2004	(Italy) Bormio	3000m	(South Korea) Kim Min-jee	(South Korea) Choi Eun-kyung	(China) Fu Tianyu
15 February 2004	(Italy) Bormio	5000m relay	China	Italy	(South Korea) Korea

== Overall standings ==
=== Men ===
Distance	Winner	Second	Third
500m	(China) Li Jiajun	(South Korea) Ahn Hyun-soo	(South Korea) Song Suk-woo
1000m	(South Korea) Ahn Hyun-soo	(United States) Apolo Anton Ohno	(Canada) Jonathan Guilmette
1500m	(South Korea) Ahn Hyun-soo	(United States) Apolo Anton Ohno	(South Korea) Song Suk-woo
5000m relay	China	Canada	South Korea
Overall	(South Korea) Ahn Hyun-soo	(South Korea) Song Suk-woo	(United States) Apolo Anton Ohno

=== Women ===
Distance	Winner	Second	Third
500m	(China) Fu Tianyu	(China) Wang Meng	(Canada) Amélie Goulet-Nadon
1000m	(Canada) Choi Eun-kyung	(South Korea) Byun Chun-sa	(China) Wang Meng
1500m	(Canada) Choi Eun-kyung	(South Korea) Byun Chun-sa	(China) Wang Meng
3000m relay	South Korea	China	Italy
Overall	(Canada) Choi Eun-kyung	(South Korea) Byun Chun-sa	(China) Wang Meng

== Podium summary ==
Rank	Nation	Gold	Silver	Bronze	Total
1	South Korea (KOR)	38	24	17	79
2	China (CHN)	13	13	12	38
3	Canada (CAN)	5	15	14	34
4	United States (USA)	4	2	6	12
5	Italy (ITA)	0	5	6	11
6	Russia (RUS)	0	1	0	1
7	Bulgaria (BUL)	0	0	4	4
8	Japan (JPN)	0	0	1	1
Totals (8 entries)		60	60	60	180

== See also ==
- 2004 World Short Track Speed Skating Championships
- 2004 World Short Track Speed Skating Team Championships
- 2004 European Short Track Speed Skating Championships
