= Short-track speed skating at the 2002 Winter Olympics – Men's 5000 metre relay =

Men's 5000 metre relay at the XIX Olympic Winter Games
- Pictogram for short track
- Venue: Salt Lake Ice Center
- Dates: 13–23 February 2002
- Competitors: 36 from 8 nations
- Winning time: 6:51.579

Medalists
1st place, gold medalist(s)		Canada; Éric Bédard; Marc Gagnon; François-Louis Tremblay; Mathieu Turcotte; Jonathan Guilmette
2nd place, silver medalist(s)		Italy; Nicola Franceschina; Nicola Rodigari; Fabio Carta; Maurizio Carnino; Michele Antonioli
3rd place, bronze medalist(s)		China; Li Jiajun; Feng Kai; Guo Wei; Li Ye; An Yulong

The men's 5000 metre relay in short track speed skating at the 2002 Winter Olympics took place on 13 and 23 February at the Salt Lake Ice Center.

== Records ==
Prior to this competition, the existing world and Olympic records were as follows:

World record	Canada (CAN)	6:43.730	Calgary, Canada	14 October 2001
Olympic record	Japan	7:01.660	Nagano, Japan	21 February 1998

The following new Olympic records were set during this competition.

Date	Round	Team	Time	OR	WR
13 February	Heat 1	Canada; Éric Bédard; Marc Gagnon; François-Louis Tremblay; Mathieu Turcotte	6:45.455	OR	

== Results ==
=== Semifinals ===
The semifinals were held on 13 February. The top two teams in each semifinal qualified for the A final, while the third and fourth place teams advanced to the B Final.

Semifinal 1

Rank	Country	Athletes	Time	Notes
1	Canada	Éric Bédard; Marc Gagnon; François-Louis Tremblay; Mathieu Turcotte	6:45.455	QA
2	China	Li Jiajun; Feng Kai; Guo Wei; An Yulong	6:46.625	QA
3	Japan	Takafumi Nishitani; Satoru Terao; Naoya Tamura; Takehiro Kodera	6:50.925	QB
4	Belgium	Pieter Gysel; Simon Van Vossel; Ward Janssens; Wim De Deyne	6:56.389	QB

Semifinal 2

Rank	Country	Athletes	Time	Notes
1	United States	Ron Biondo; Apolo Anton Ohno; Rusty Smith; Dan Weinstein	7:09.788	QA
2	Italy	Nicola Franceschina; Nicola Rodigari; Fabio Carta; Michele Antonioli	7:10.788	QA
3	Australia	Steven Bradbury; Alex McEwan; Andrew McNee; Stephen Lee	7:19.177	QB
–	South Korea	Kim Dong-sung; Min Ryoung; Lee Seung-jae; Oh Se-jong	DQ	

=== Finals ===
The four qualifying teams competed in Final A, while three others raced in Final B.

Final A

Rank	Country	Athletes	Time	Notes
1st place, gold medalist(s)	Canada	Marc Gagnon; Jonathan Guilmette; François-Louis Tremblay; Mathieu Turcotte	6:51.579	
2nd place, silver medalist(s)	Italy	Nicola Franceschina; Nicola Rodigari; Fabio Carta; Maurizio Carnino	6:56.327	
3rd place, bronze medalist(s)	China	Li Jiajun; Feng Kai; Guo Wei; Li Ye	6:59.633	
4	United States	Ron Biondo; Apolo Anton Ohno; Rusty Smith; Dan Weinstein	7:03.926	

Final B

Rank	Country	Athletes	Time	Notes
5	Japan	Takafumi Nishitani; Satoru Terao; Yugo Shinohara; Takehiro Kodera	7:19.893	
6	Australia	Steven Bradbury; Alex McEwan; Andrew McNee; Stephen Lee	7:45.271	
–	Belgium	Pieter Gysel; Simon Van Vossel; Ward Janssens; Wim De Deyne	DQ	
