= 2000–01 ISU Short Track Speed Skating World Cup =

The 2001 Short Track Speed Skating World Cup was a multi-race tournament over a season for short track speed skating. The season began on 20 October 2000 and ended on 4 February 2001. The World Cup was organised by the ISU.

== Men ==
=== Events ===
Date	Place	Discipline	Winner	2nd place	3rd place
20–22 October 2000	(Canada) Calgary	500 m	(United States) Apolo Anton Ohno	(Canada) François-Louis Tremblay	(United States) Rusty Smith
20–22 October 2000	(Canada) Calgary	1000 m	(United States) Apolo Anton Ohno	(South Korea) Kim Dong-Sung	(South Korea) Min Ryoung
20–22 October 2000	(Canada) Calgary	1500 m	(United States) Apolo Anton Ohno	(Canada) Marc Gagnon	(France) Bruno Loscos
20–22 October 2000	(Canada) Calgary	3000 m	(South Korea) Kim Dong-Sung	(South Korea) Min Ryoung	(Canada) François-Louis Tremblay
20–22 October 2000	(Canada) Calgary	5000 m relay	South Korea	Canada	Japan
27–29 October 2000	(United States) Salt Lake City	500 m	(United States) Apolo Anton Ohno	(China) Li Jiajun	(Japan) Takafumi Nishitani
27–29 October 2000	(United States) Salt Lake City	1000 m	(South Korea) Kim Dong-Sung	(China) Li Jiajun	(Canada) Marc Gagnon
27–29 October 2000	(United States) Salt Lake City	1500 m	(China) Li Jiajun	(South Korea) Kim Dong-Sung	(Canada) Marc Gagnon
27–29 October 2000	(United States) Salt Lake City	3000 m	(United States) Apolo Anton Ohno	(China) Li Jiajun	(Canada) Marc Gagnon
27–29 October 2000	(United States) Salt Lake City	5000 m relay	South Korea	Canada	Italy
1–3 December 2000	(Japan) Nobeyama	500 m	(Canada) François-Louis Tremblay	(Japan) Satoru Terao	(Japan) Takafumi Nishitani
1–3 December 2000	(Japan) Nobeyama	1000 m	(Canada) Marc Gagnon	(South Korea) Kim Dong-Sung	(United States) Adam Riedy
1–3 December 2000	(Japan) Nobeyama	1500 m	(United States) Apolo Anton Ohno	(Canada) Marc Gagnon	(South Korea) Kim Dong-Sung
1–3 December 2000	(Japan) Nobeyama	3000 m	(United States) Apolo Anton Ohno	(Canada) Marc Gagnon	(Japan) Satoru Terao
1–3 December 2000	(Japan) Nobeyama	5000 m relay	China	Canada	United States
8–10 December 2000	(China) Changchun	500 m	(Canada) François-Louis Tremblay	(China) Feng Kai	(China) An Yulong
8–10 December 2000	(China) Changchun	1000 m	(Canada) Éric Bédard	(China) An Yulong	(United States) Rusty Smith
8–10 December 2000	(China) Changchun	1500 m	(United States) Apolo Anton Ohno	(South Korea) Min Ryoung	(Canada) Éric Bédard
8–10 December 2000	(China) Changchun	3000 m	(United States) Apolo Anton Ohno	(South Korea) Min Ryoung	(United States) Rusty Smith
8–10 December 2000	(China) Changchun	5000 m relay	China	United States	Canada
19–21 January 2001 European Championships in The Hague, Netherlands
26–28 January 2001	(Slovakia) Trnava	500 m	(Canada) Éric Bédard	(China) An Yulong	(South Korea) Min Ryoung
26–28 January 2001	(Slovakia) Trnava	1000 m	(China) Li Jiajun	(Italy) Fabio Carta	(South Korea) Min Ryoung
26–28 January 2001	(Slovakia) Trnava	1500 m	(China) Li Jiajun	(South Korea) Lee Seung-Jae	(Netherlands) Cees Juffermans
26–28 January 2001	(Slovakia) Trnava	3000 m	(South Korea) An Jung-Hyun	(South Korea) Lee Seung-Jae	(South Korea) Min Ryoung
26–28 January 2001	(Slovakia) Trnava	5000 m relay	Canada	South Korea	Italy
2–4 February 2001	(Austria) Graz	500 m	(United States) Apolo Anton Ohno (Canada) Éric Bédard		(United States) Rusty Smith
2–4 February 2001	(Austria) Graz	1000 m	(United States) Daniel Weinstein	(China) Feng Kai	(United States) Rusty Smith
2–4 February 2001	(Austria) Graz	1500 m	(United States) Apolo Anton Ohno	(China) Li Jiajun	(France) Bruno Loscos (Canada) Éric Bédard
2–4 February 2001	(Austria) Graz	3000 m	(United States) Apolo Anton Ohno	(China) Li Jiajun	(France) Bruno Loscos
2–4 February 2001	(Austria) Graz	5000 m relay	Canada	China	Italy
24–25 March 2001 World Team Championships in Nobeyama, Japan
30 March - 1 April 2001 World Championships in Jeonju, South Korea

=== World Cup Rankings ===
Overall

Rank	Name	Points
1	(United States) Apolo Anton Ohno	99
2	(China) Li Jiajun	92
3	(Canada) François-Louis Tremblay	88
4	(South Korea) Min Ryoung	83
5	(Canada) Marc Gagnon	82
6	(Canada) Éric Bédard	79
7	(United States) Daniel Weinstein	73
8	(China) An Yulong	73
9	(Japan) Satoru Terao	70
10	(South Korea) Kim Dong-Sung	68

500 m

Rank	Name	Points
1	(United States) Apolo Anton Ohno	96
2	(Canada) François-Louis Tremblay	96
3	(China) Li Jiajun	88
4	(China) An Yulong	87
5	(Canada) Éric Bédard	86
6	(Japan) Takafumi Nishitani	76
7	(South Korea) Min Ryoung	72
8	(Japan) Satoru Terao	69
9	(Canada) Marc Gagnon	68
10	(United States) Rusty Smith	66

1000 m

Rank	Name	Points
1	(United States) Apolo Anton Ohno	84
2	(China) Li Jiajun	83
3	(United States) Daniel Weinstein	82
4	(Canada) Marc Gagnon	81
5	(South Korea) Min Ryoung	81
6	(China) An Yulong	78
7	(Canada) François-Louis Tremblay	77
8	(Japan) Satoru Terao	76
9	(South Korea) Kim Dong-Sung	73
10	(United Kingdom) Nicky Gooch	73

1500 m

Rank	Name	Points
1	(United States) Apolo Anton Ohno	100
2	(China) Li Jiajun	93
3	(Canada) Marc Gagnon	93
4	(France) Bruno Loscos	82
5	(South Korea) Min Ryoung	81
6	(South Korea) Lee Seung-Jae	80
7	(Canada) François-Louis Tremblay	76
8	(China) Feng Kai	71
9	(South Korea) Kim Dong-Sung	69
10	(China) An Yulong	60

5000 m relay

Rank	Name	Points
1	Canada	98
2	China	96
3	South Korea	96
4	Italy	91
5	United States	84
6	Japan	84
7	(United Kingdom) Great Britain	82
8	Netherlands	80
9	Australia	72
10	Germany	59

== Women ==
=== Events ===
Date	Place	Discipline	Winner	2nd place	3rd place
20–22 October 2000	(Canada) Calgary	500 m	(Bulgaria) Evgenia Radanova	(Canada) Annie Perreault	(China) Yang Yang (A)
20–22 October 2000	(Canada) Calgary	1000 m	(China) Yang Yang (A)	(China) Sun Dandan	(Bulgaria) Evgenia Radanova
20–22 October 2000	(Canada) Calgary	1500 m	(China) Yang Yang (A)	(China) Yang Yang (S)	(South Korea) Choi Min-Kyung
20–22 October 2000	(Canada) Calgary	3000 m	(South Korea) Choi Min-Kyung	(China) Yang Yang (A)	(Canada) Annie Perreault
20–22 October 2000	(Canada) Calgary	5000 m relay	China	South Korea	Bulgaria
27–29 October 2000	(United States) Salt Lake City	500 m	(China) Yang Yang (A)	(China) Yang Yang (S)	(China) Sun Dandan
27–29 October 2000	(United States) Salt Lake City	1000 m	(China) Yang Yang (A)	(South Korea) Park Hye-won	(South Korea) Joo Min-Jin
27–29 October 2000	(United States) Salt Lake City	1500 m	(South Korea) Park Hye-won	(China) Yang Yang (A)	(Bulgaria) Evgenia Radanova
27–29 October 2000	(United States) Salt Lake City	3000 m	(South Korea) Park Hye-won	(China) Yang Yang (S)	(South Korea) Joo Min-Jin
27–29 October 2000	(United States) Salt Lake City	5000 m relay	China	South Korea	Italy
1–3 December 2000	(Japan) Nobeyama	500 m	(China) Wang Chunlu	(China) Yang Yang (S)	(United States) Amy Peterson
1–3 December 2000	(Japan) Nobeyama	1000 m	(South Korea) Park Hye-won	(China) Sun Dandan	(South Korea) Choi Eun-Kyung
1–3 December 2000	(Japan) Nobeyama	1500 m	(South Korea) Park Hye-won	(South Korea) Choi Eun-Kyung	(China) Yang Yang (S)
1–3 December 2000	(Japan) Nobeyama	3000 m	(South Korea) Park Hye-won	(South Korea) Choi Eun-Kyung	(Japan) Chikage Tanaka
1–3 December 2000	(Japan) Nobeyama	5000 m relay	South Korea	Canada	United States
8–10 December 2000	(China) Changchun	500 m	(China) Yang Yang (A)	(South Korea) Choi Min-Kyung	(China) Sun Dandan
8–10 December 2000	(China) Changchun	1000 m	(China) Yang Yang (A)	(China) Sun Dandan	(South Korea) Park Hye-won
8–10 December 2000	(China) Changchun	1500 m	(China) Sun Dandan	(United States) Julie Goskowicz	(South Korea) Choi Min-Kyung
8–10 December 2000	(China) Changchun	3000 m	(South Korea) Park Hye-won	(China) Yang Yang (A)	(South Korea) Choi Min-Kyung
8–10 December 2000	(China) Changchun	5000 m relay	China	South Korea	Canada
19–21 January 2001 European Championships in The Hague, Netherlands
26–28 January 2001	(Slovakia) Trnava	500 m	(Bulgaria) Evgenia Radanova	(China) Yang Yang (A)	(China) Sun Dandan
26–28 January 2001	(Slovakia) Trnava	1000 m	(China) Yang Yang (A)	(Bulgaria) Evgenia Radanova	(South Korea) Joo Min-Jin
26–28 January 2001	(Slovakia) Trnava	1500 m	(China) Yang Yang (A)	(Canada) Marie-Ève Drolet	(South Korea) Choi Eun-Kyung
26–28 January 2001	(Slovakia) Trnava	3000 m	(South Korea) Choi Eun-Kyung	(Canada) Marie-Ève Drolet	(Bulgaria) Evgenia Radanova
26–28 January 2001	(Slovakia) Trnava	5000 m relay	Canada	South Korea	Bulgaria
2–4 February 2001	(Austria) Graz	500 m	(Bulgaria) Evgenia Radanova	(China) Wang Chunlu	(Italy) Marta Capurso
2–4 February 2001	(Austria) Graz	1000 m	(Bulgaria) Evgenia Radanova	(China) Sun Dandan	(China) Wang Chunlu
2–4 February 2001	(Austria) Graz	1500 m	(Canada) Marie-Ève Drolet	(Italy) Katia Zini	(China) Sun Dandan
2–4 February 2001	(Austria) Graz	3000 m	(China) Wang Chunlu	(China) Yang Yang (S)	(Bulgaria) Evgenia Radanova
2–4 February 2001	(Austria) Graz	5000 m relay	China	Italy	Bulgaria
24–25 March 2001 World Team Championships in Nobeyama, Japan
30 March - 1 April 2001 World Championships in Jeonju, South Korea

=== World Cup Rankings ===
Overall

Rank	Name	Points
1	(China) Yang Yang (A)	99
2	(Bulgaria) Evgenia Radanova	93
3	(South Korea) Park Hye-won	91
4	(South Korea) Choi Eun-Kyung	89
5	(China) Yang Yang (S)	89
6	(China) Sun Dandan	86
7	(Canada) Alanna Kraus	70
8	(Japan) Chikage Tanaka	69
9	(United States) Amy Peterson	68
10	(South Korea) Choi Min-Kyung	62

500 m

Rank	Name	Points
1	(Bulgaria) Evgenia Radanova	97
2	(China) Yang Yang (A)	97
3	(China) Yang Yang (S)	92
4	(China) Sun Dandan	90
5	(South Korea) Park Hye-won	88
6	(South Korea) Choi Eun-Kyung	76
7	(Canada) Alanna Kraus	75
8	(South Korea) Choi Min-Kyung	74
9	(China) Wang Chunlu	71
10	(United States) Amy Peterson	68

1000 m

Rank	Name	Points
1	(China) Yang Yang (A)	100
2	(China) Sun Dandan	96
3	(Bulgaria) Evgenia Radanova	93
4	(South Korea) Park Hye-won	92
5	(China) Yang Yang (S)	80
6	(South Korea) Choi Min-Kyung	79
7	(Japan) Chikage Tanaka	74
8	(Canada) Tania Vicent	71
9	(United States) Amy Peterson	66
10	(Japan) Ikue Teshigawara	66

1500 m

Rank	Name	Points
1	(China) Yang Yang (A)	90
2	(China) Yang Yang (S)	92
3	(South Korea) Park Hye-won	91
4	(South Korea) Choi Eun-Kyung	87
5	(China) Sun Dandan	85
6	(Bulgaria) Evgenia Radanova	85
7	(Japan) Chikage Tanaka	72
8	(South Korea) Choi Min-Kyung	66
9	(United States) Julie Goskowicz	64
10	(United States) Amy Peterson	64

5000 m relay

Rank	Name	Points
1	China	100
2	South Korea	97
3	Canada	94
4	Bulgaria	91
5	Italy	88
6	United States	87
7	Japan	80
8	Netherlands	79
9	Ukraine	53
10	Austria	19

== Podium summary ==
Rank	Nation	Gold	Silver	Bronze	Total
1	China (CHN)	20	24	8	52
2	South Korea (KOR)	14	17	14	45
3	United States (USA)	13	2	9	24
4	Canada (CAN)	10	11	9	30
5	Bulgaria (BUL)	4	1	7	12
6	Italy (ITA)	0	3	5	8
7	Japan (JPN)	0	1	5	6
8	France (FRA)	0	0	3	3
9	Netherlands (NED)	0	0	1	1
Totals (9 entries)		61	59	61	181
