= 1999–2000 ISU Short Track Speed Skating World Cup =

The 2000 Short Track Speed Skating World Cup was a multi-race tournament over a season for short track speed skating. The season began on 19 October 1999 and ended on 4 February 2000. The World Cup was organised by the ISU who also ran world cups and championships in speed skating and figure skating.

== Men ==
=== Events ===
Date	Place	Discipline	Winner	2nd place	3rd place
19-21 October 1999	(Canada) Montreal	500 m	(South Korea) Kim Dong-Sung	(Canada) François-Louis Tremblay	(Italy) Fabio Carta
19-21 October 1999	(Canada) Montreal	1000 m	(South Korea) Kim Dong-Sung	(China) Li Jiajun	(United States) Apolo Anton Ohno
19-21 October 1999	(Canada) Montreal	1500 m	(South Korea) Min Ryoung	(South Korea) Kim Dong-Sung	(China) Li Jiajun
19-21 October 1999	(Canada) Montreal	3000 m	(South Korea) Min Ryoung	(South Korea) Lee Seung-Jae	(Canada) François-Louis Tremblay
19-21 October 1999	(Canada) Montreal	5000 m relay	China	South Korea	Canada
27-29 October 1999	(United States) Salt Lake City	500 m	(China) Li Jiajun	(South Korea) Kim Dong-Sung	(United States) Apolo Anton Ohno
27-29 October 1999	(United States) Salt Lake City	1000 m	(South Korea) Kim Dong-Sung	(Japan) Satoru Terao	(United States) Apolo Anton Ohno
27-29 October 1999	(United States) Salt Lake City	1500 m	(South Korea) Kim Dong-Sung	(Japan) Satoru Terao	(Italy) Fabio Carta
27-29 October 1999	(United States) Salt Lake City	3000 m	(South Korea) Kim Dong-Sung	(Japan) Satoru Terao	(China) Li Jiajun
27-29 October 1999	(United States) Salt Lake City	5000 m relay	South Korea	Japan	Canada
24-26 November 1999	(Japan) Nobeyama	500 m	(Japan) Satoru Terao	(China) Li Jiajun	(South Korea) Kim Dong-Sung
24-26 November 1999	(Japan) Nobeyama	1000 m	(Japan) Satoru Terao	(China) Li Jiajun	(China) Feng Kai
24-26 November 1999	(Japan) Nobeyama	1500 m	(Japan) Satoru Terao	(South Korea) Kim Dong-Sung	(Canada) François-Louis Tremblay
24-26 November 1999	(Japan) Nobeyama	3000 m	(South Korea) Kim Dong-Sung	(South Korea) Min Ryoung	(Japan) Satoru Terao
24-26 November 1999	(Japan) Nobeyama	5000 m relay	South Korea	Canada	China
1-3 December 1999	(China) Changchun	500 m	(China) Li Jiajun	(South Korea) Kim Dong-Sung	(Japan) Satoru Terao
1-3 December 1999	(China) Changchun	1000 m	(South Korea) Kim Dong-Sung	(United States) Apolo Anton Ohno	(South Korea) Min Ryoung
1-3 December 1999	(China) Changchun	1500 m	(United States) Apolo Anton Ohno	(China) Feng Kai	(United States) Rusty Smith
1-3 December 1999	(China) Changchun	3000 m	(China) Feng Kai	(United States) Apolo Anton Ohno	(South Korea) Min Ryoung
1-3 December 1999	(China) Changchun	5000 m relay	China	Japan	United States
21-23 January 2000 European Championships in Bormio, Italy
25-27 January 2000	(Sweden) Gothenburg	500 m	(China) Li Jiajun	(Canada) Mathieu Turcotte	(Italy) Fabio Carta
25-27 January 2000	(Sweden) Gothenburg	1000 m	(China) An Yulong	(Canada) Mathieu Turcotte	(South Korea) Kim Dong-Sung
25-27 January 2000	(Sweden) Gothenburg	1500 m	(Canada) Jonathan Guilmette	(China) Li Jiajun	(Italy) Fabio Carta
25-27 January 2000	(Sweden) Gothenburg	3000 m	(Italy) Fabio Carta	(Canada) Jeff Scholten	(Canada) Jonathan Guilmette
25-27 January 2000	(Sweden) Gothenburg	5000 m relay	South Korea	Italy	Canada
2-4 February 2000	(Netherlands) Heerenveen	500 m	(Canada) Jeff Scholten	(China) Feng Kai	(China) An Yulong
2-4 February 2000	(Netherlands) Heerenveen	1000 m	(South Korea) Min Ryoung	(China) Feng Kai	(Canada) Mathieu Turcotte
2-4 February 2000	(Netherlands) Heerenveen	1500 m	(Italy) Fabio Carta	(China) Li Jiajun	(South Korea) Lee Seung-Jae
2-4 February 2000	(Netherlands) Heerenveen	3000 m	(South Korea) Min Ryoung	(China) Feng Kai	(Italy) Fabio Carta
2-4 February 2000	(Netherlands) Heerenveen	5000 m relay	China	South Korea	Italy
4-5 March 2000 World Team Championships in The Hague, Netherlands
10-12 March 2000 World Championships in (United Kingdom) Sheffield, Great Britain

=== World Cup Rankings ===
Overall

Rank	Name	Points
1	(South Korea) Kim Dong-Sung	97
2	(China) Li Jiajun	94
3	(South Korea) Min Ryoung	92
4	(Italy) Fabio Carta	87
5	(Japan) Satoru Terao	86
6	(China) Feng Kai	86
7	(United States) Apolo Anton Ohno	83
8	(China) An Yulong	80
9	(Canada) François-Louis Tremblay	77
10	(South Korea) Lee Seung-Jae	71

500 m

Rank	Name	Points
1	(China) Li Jiajun	99
2	(South Korea) Kim Dong-Sung	96
3	(Japan) Satoru Terao	86
4	(China) Feng Kai	84
5	(Italy) Fabio Carta	81
6	(China) An Yulong	80
7	(Canada) François-Louis Tremblay	79
8	(United States) Apolo Anton Ohno	71
9	(Japan) Takafumi Nishitani	69
10	(South Korea) Min Ryoung	66

1000 m

Rank	Name	Points
1	(South Korea) Kim Dong-Sung	98
2	(China) Li Jiajun	92
3	(South Korea) Min Ryoung	90
4	(United States) Apolo Anton Ohno	88
5	(China) An Yulong	80
6	(Canada) François-Louis Tremblay	79
7	(Japan) Satoru Terao	77
8	(Italy) Fabio Carta	67
9	(South Korea) Lee Seung-Jae	67
10	(China) Feng Kai	65

1500 m

Rank	Name	Points
1	(China) Li Jiajun	93
2	(Italy) Fabio Carta	92
3	(South Korea) Kim Dong-Sung	88
4	(South Korea) Min Ryoung	87
5	(China) An Yulong	83
6	(China) Feng Kai	82
7	(Japan) Satoru Terao	79
8	(United States) Apolo Anton Ohno	67
9	(Italy) Michele Antonioli	67
10	(France) Bruno Loscos	62

5000 m relay

Rank	Name	Points
1	South Korea	99
2	China	98
3	Canada	93
4	Japan	90
5	United States	85
6	Hungary	79
7	Netherlands	79
8	(United Kingdom) Great Britain	56
9	Germany	54
10	Australia	37

== Women ==
=== Events ===
Date	Place	Discipline	Winner	2nd place	3rd place
19-21 October 1999	(Canada) Montreal	500 m	(South Korea) Joo Min-Jin	(South Korea) Choi Min-kyung	(China) Wang Chunlu
19-21 October 1999	(Canada) Montreal	1000 m	(South Korea) Choi Min-kyung	(South Korea) Joo Min-Jin	(Bulgaria) Evgenia Radanova
19-21 October 1999	(Canada) Montreal	1500 m	(China) Yang Yang (A)	(South Korea) Park Hye-Won	(Bulgaria) Evgenia Radanova
19-21 October 1999	(Canada) Montreal	3000 m	(South Korea) Park Hye-Won	(China) Yang Yang (A)	(South Korea) Joo Min-Jin
19-21 October 1999	(Canada) Montreal	3000 m relay	China	South Korea	Canada
27-29 October 1999	(United States) Salt Lake City	500 m	(China) Yang Yang (S)	(Canada) Annie Perreault	(Japan) Chikage Tanaka
27-29 October 1999	(United States) Salt Lake City	1000 m	(Bulgaria) Evgenia Radanova	(South Korea) Choi Min-kyung	(South Korea) Park Hye-Won
27-29 October 1999	(United States) Salt Lake City	1500 m	(China) Yang Yang (A)	(China) Yang Yang (S)	(South Korea) Choi Min-kyung
27-29 October 1999	(United States) Salt Lake City	3000 m	(South Korea) Choi Min-kyung	(Canada) Tania Vicent	(Bulgaria) Evgenia Radanova
27-29 October 1999	(United States) Salt Lake City	3000 m relay	China	Canada	Bulgaria
24-26 November 1999	(Japan) Nobeyama	500 m	(Bulgaria) Evgenia Radanova	(China) Yang Yang (S)	(China) Wang Chunlu
24-26 November 1999	(Japan) Nobeyama	1000 m	(Bulgaria) Evgenia Radanova	(South Korea) Park Hye-Won	(China) Yang Yang (S)
24-26 November 1999	(Japan) Nobeyama	1500 m	(China) Yang Yang (A)	(Bulgaria) Evgenia Radanova	(South Korea) Choi Min-kyung
24-26 November 1999	(Japan) Nobeyama	3000 m	(South Korea) Park Hye-Won	(South Korea) Kim Yun-mi	(Bulgaria) Evgenia Radanova
24-26 November 1999	(Japan) Nobeyama	3000 m relay	China	South Korea	Japan
1-3 December 1999	(China) Changchun	500 m	(China) Wang Chunlu	(South Korea) Choi Min-kyung	(Canada) Annie Perreault
1-3 December 1999	(China) Changchun	1000 m	(China) Yang Yang (A)	(China) Yang Yang (S)	(China) Wang Chunlu
1-3 December 1999	(China) Changchun	1500 m	(China) Yang Yang (A)	(Bulgaria) Evgenia Radanova	(South Korea) Choi Min-kyung
1-3 December 1999	(China) Changchun	3000 m	(China) Yang Yang (A)	(South Korea) Park Hye-Won	(Bulgaria) Evgenia Radanova
1-3 December 1999	(China) Changchun	3000 m relay	China	South Korea	Japan
21-23 January 2000 European Championships in Bormio, Italy
25-27 January 2000	(Sweden) Gothenburg	500 m	(China) Yang Yang (A)	(China) Wang Chunlu	(South Korea) Joo Min-Jin
25-27 January 2000	(Sweden) Gothenburg	1000 m	(China) Yang Yang (A)	(South Korea) Park Hye-Won	(South Korea) An Sang-Mi
25-27 January 2000	(Sweden) Gothenburg	1500 m	(China) Yang Yang (S)	(South Korea) Joo Min-Jin	(Bulgaria) Evgenia Radanova
25-27 January 2000	(Sweden) Gothenburg	3000 m	(South Korea) An Sang-Mi	(China) Yang Yang (A)	(South Korea) Park Hye-Won
25-27 January 2000	(Sweden) Gothenburg	3000 m relay	China	South Korea	Italy
2-4 February 2000	(Netherlands) Heerenveen	500 m	(Bulgaria) Evgenia Radanova	(China) Yang Yang (S)	(China) Yang Yang (A)
2-4 February 2000	(Netherlands) Heerenveen	1000 m	(China) Yang Yang (A)	(South Korea) Joo Min-Jin	(Bulgaria) Evgenia Radanova
2-4 February 2000	(Netherlands) Heerenveen	1500 m	(China) Yang Yang (A)	(Bulgaria) Evgenia Radanova	(South Korea) Park Hye-Won
2-4 February 2000	(Netherlands) Heerenveen	3000 m	(China) Yang Yang (A)	(South Korea) Park Hye-Won	(South Korea) An Sang-Mi
2-4 February 2000	(Netherlands) Heerenveen	3000 m relay	South Korea	Canada	Netherlands
4-5 March 2000 World Team Championships in The Hague, Netherlands
10-12 March 2000 World Championships in (United Kingdom) Sheffield, Great Britain

=== World Cup Rankings ===
Overall

Rank	Name	Points
1	(China) Yang Yang (A)	97
2	(Bulgaria) Evgenia Radanova	95
3	(South Korea) Park Hye-won	91
4	(South Korea) Choi Min-kyung	90
5	(China) Yang Yang (S)	90
6	(China) Wang Chunlu	83
7	(Canada) Erin Porter	75
8	(South Korea) Joo Min-jin	69
9	(Japan) Chikage Tanaka	65
10	(Italy) Katia Zini	65

500 m

Rank	Name	Points
1	(China) Yang Yang (S)	95
2	(China) Wang Chunlu	95
3	(Bulgaria) Evgenia Radanova	90
4	(Canada) Annie Perreault	90
5	(China) Yang Yang (A)	89
6	(South Korea) Choi Min-kyung	81
7	(Japan) Chikage Tanaka	78
8	(South Korea) Erin Porter	68
9	(Italy) Katia Zini	68
10	(South Korea) Park Hye-won	62

1000 m

Rank	Name	Points
1	(China) Yang Yang (A)	97
2	(Bulgaria) Evgenia Radanova	96
3	(South Korea) Park Hye-won	92
4	(China) Yang Yang (S)	91
5	(South Korea) Choi Min-kyung	87
6	(China) Wang Chunlu	86
7	(United States) Julie Goskowicz	67
8	(Japan) Chikage Tanaka	65
9	(Italy) Katia Zini	64
10	(Italy) Evelina Rodigari	60

1500 m

Rank	Name	Points
1	(China) Yang Yang (A)	100
2	(Bulgaria) Evgenia Radanova	95
3	(China) Yang Yang (S)	92
4	(South Korea) Choi Min-kyung	91
5	(South Korea) Park Hye-won	88
6	(South Korea) Joo Min-jin	76
7	(China) Wang Chunlu	74
8	(United States) Amy Peterson	67
9	(Italy) Katia Zini	61
10	(Japan) Chikage Tanaka	58

3000 m relay

Rank	Name	Points
1	China	100
2	South Korea	97
3	Canada	93
4	Japan	86
5	Italy	84
6	United States	84
7	Netherlands	81
8	Bulgaria	67
9	(United Kingdom) Great Britain	20
10	Austria	19

== Podium summary ==
Rank	Nation	Gold	Silver	Bronze	Total
1	China (CHN)	27	16	10	53
2	South Korea (KOR)	21	24	15	60
3	Bulgaria (BUL)	4	3	8	15
4	Japan (JPN)	3	5	5	13
5	Canada (CAN)	2	9	9	20
6	Italy (ITA)	2	1	7	10
7	United States (USA)	1	2	5	8
8	Netherlands (NED)	0	0	1	1
Totals (8 entries)		60	60	60	180
