= 2002 World Short Track Speed Skating Team Championships =

Short track team championship

- Location: Milwaukee, United States
- Start date: 29 March 2002
- End date: 30 March 2002

The 2002 World Short Track Speed Skating Team Championships is the 12th edition of the World Short Track Speed Skating Team Championships, which took place on 29–30 March 2001 in Milwaukee, United States.

Teams were divided into two brackets of four: the best team from each bracket qualified directly for the final, while the two next teams entered for the repechage round and the last was eliminated. The best two teams in the repechage round qualified for the final. Thus, the final consisted of four teams. Each team was represented by four athletes at both 500 m and 1000 m as well as by two athletes at 3000 m. There were four heats at both 500 m and 1000 m, whereby each heat consisted of athletes representing different countries. There was one heat at 3000 m.

== Medal winners ==
Event	Gold	Silver	Bronze
Men	China; Liu Yingbao; Guo Wei; Li Ye; Li Jiajun; Li Haonan	Canada; Jonathan Guilmette; François-Louis Tremblay; Éric Bédard; Mathieu Turcotte; Jean-François Monette	South Korea; An Jung-hyun; Ahn Hyun-soo; Oh Se-jong; Lee Seung-jae; Kim Dong-sung
Women	South Korea; Ko Gi-hyun; Choi Min-kyung; Joo Min-jin; Choi Eun-kyung; Park Hye-won	China; Wang Chunlu; Yang Yang (A); Fu Tianyu; Liu Xiaoying; Wang Wei	Canada; Marie-Ève Drolet; Alanna Kraus; Annie Perreault; Amélie Goulet-Nadon; Tania Vicent

== Results ==
=== Men ===
Rank	Nation	Total
1st place, gold medalist(s)	China	36
2nd place, silver medalist(s)	Canada	34
3rd place, bronze medalist(s)	South Korea	34
4	Italy	13
5	United States	Rep.
6	Japan	Rep.
7	Belgium	DNQ
8	United Kingdom	DNQ

=== Women ===
Rank	Nation	Total
1st place, gold medalist(s)	South Korea	36
2nd place, silver medalist(s)	China	35
3rd place, bronze medalist(s)	Canada	30
4	United States	18
5	Italy	Rep.
6	Bulgaria	Rep.
7	Japan	DNQ
8	Russia	DNQ
