= Short-track speed skating at the 2003 Asian Winter Games =

International sporting competition

- Venue: Misawa Ice Arena
- Dates: 6–7 February 2003

Short-track speed skating at the 2003 Winter Asian Games took place at the Misawa Ice Arena located in Misawa, Aomori Prefecture, Japan from 6 to 7 February 2003 with ten events contested — five each for men and women.

== Medalists ==
=== Men ===
Event	Gold	Silver	Bronze
500 m	Li Jiajun; China	Takafumi Nishitani; Japan	Song Suk-woo; South Korea
1000 m	Ahn Hyun-soo; South Korea	Li Ye; China	Satoru Terao; Japan
1500 m	Ahn Hyun-soo; South Korea	Li Jiajun; China	Lee Seung-jae; South Korea
3000 m	Song Suk-woo; South Korea	Lee Seung-jae; South Korea	Li Jiajun; China
5000 m relay	South Korea; Lee Seung-jae; Oh Se-jong; Yeo Jun-hyung; Ahn Hyun-soo; Song Suk-woo	China; Li Ye; Guo Wei; Liu Yingbao; Li Jiajun; Li Haonan	Japan; Takafumi Nishitani; Satoru Terao; Yoshiharu Arino; Hayato Sueyoshi; Tomonori Ike

=== Women ===
Event	Gold	Silver	Bronze
500 m	Yang Yang; China	Wang Meng; China	Ri Hyang-mi; North Korea
1000 m	Yang Yang; China	Fu Tianyu; China	Cho Ha-ri; South Korea
1500 m	Choi Eun-kyung; South Korea	Cho Ha-ri; South Korea	Ko Gi-hyun; South Korea
3000 m	Yang Yang; China	Choi Eun-kyung; South Korea	Kim Min-jee; South Korea
3000 m relay	South Korea; Joo Min-jin; Choi Eun-kyung; Kim Min-jee; Cho Ha-ri	North Korea; Ri Hyang-mi; Jong Ok-myong; Mun Sun-ae; Yun Jong-suk	Japan; Ikue Teshigawara; Yuka Kamino; Mika Ozawa; Yoko Iizuka

== Medal table ==
Rank	Nation	Gold	Silver	Bronze	Total
1	South Korea (KOR)	6	3	5	14
2	China (CHN)	4	5	1	10
3	Japan (JPN)	0	1	3	4
4	North Korea (PRK)	0	1	1	2
Totals (4 entries)		10	10	10	30
