= 2001 World Short Track Speed Skating Team Championships =

Short track team championship

- Location: Nobeyama, Japan
- Start date: 24 March 2001
- End date: 25 March 2001

The 2001 World Short Track Speed Skating Team Championships is the 11th edition of the World Short Track Speed Skating Team Championships, which took place on 24-25 March 2001 in Nobeyama, Japan.

New competition format was used. Teams were divided into two brackets of four: the best team from each bracket qualified directly for the final, while the two next teams entered for the repechage round and the last was eliminated. The best two teams in the repechage round qualified for the final. Thus, the final consisted of four teams. Each team was represented by four athletes at both 500 m and 1000 m as well as by two athletes at 3000 m. There were four heats at both 500 m and 1000 m, whereby each heat consisted of athletes representing different countries. There was one heat at 3000 m.

== Medal winners ==
Event	Gold	Silver	Bronze
Men	Canada; Jonathan Guilmette; François-Louis Tremblay; Éric Bédard; Marc Gagnon; Mathieu Turcotte	China; Li Ye; Li Jiajun; An Yulong; Feng Kai; Li Haonan	South Korea; Lee Jae-kyung; An Jung-hyun; Lee Seung-jae; Min Ryoung; Oh Se-jong
Women	China; Wang Chunlu; Yang Yang (A); Yang Yang (S); Sun Dandan; Zhang Juju	South Korea; Choi Eun-kyung; Joo Min-jin; Jeon Da-hye; Park Hye-rim; Park Hye-won	Canada; Alanna Kraus; Tania Vicent; Marie-Ève Drolet; Amélie Goulet-Nadon; Melanie Gagnon

== Results ==
=== Men ===
Rank	Nation	Total
1st place, gold medalist(s)	Canada	35
2nd place, silver medalist(s)	China	31
3rd place, bronze medalist(s)	South Korea	26
4	Japan	24
5	United States	Rep.
6	Italy	Rep.
7	United Kingdom	DNQ
8	Netherlands	DNQ

=== Women ===
Rank	Nation	Total
1st place, gold medalist(s)	China	43
2nd place, silver medalist(s)	South Korea	30
3rd place, bronze medalist(s)	Canada	26
4	Bulgaria	22
5	Japan	Rep.
6	Italy	Rep.
7	United States	DNQ
8	Netherlands	DNQ
