= 2006 World Short Track Speed Skating Championships =

The 2006 World Short Track Speed Skating Championships took place between March 31 and April 2, 2006 in Minneapolis, Minnesota. The World Championships are organised by the ISU which also run world cups and championships in speed skating and figure skating.

== Results ==
=== Men ===
| Event | Gold | | Silver | | Bronze | |
|---|---|---|---|---|---|---|
| Overall* | Ahn Hyun-soo; South Korea | 68 points | Lee Ho-suk; South Korea | 60 points | François-Louis Tremblay; Canada | 55 points |
| 500 m | François-Louis Tremblay; Canada | 41.439 | Li Haonan; China | 41.639 | Lee Ho-suk; South Korea | 41.737 |
| 1000 m | Ahn Hyun-soo; South Korea | 1:27.631 | Lee Ho-suk; South Korea | 1:27.864 | Charles Hamelin; Canada | 1:28.028 |
| 1500 m | Ahn Hyun-soo; South Korea | 2:20.572 | Lee Ho-suk; South Korea | 2:20.581 | Oh Se-jong; South Korea | 2:20.842 |
| 5000 m relay | Canada; Charles Hamelin; Jonathan Guilmette; François-Louis Tremblay; Mathieu Turcotte; Éric Bédard | 6:49.282 | China; Cui Liang; Li Haonan; Li Ye; Sui Baoku | 6:50.332 | United States; Alex Izykowski; J. P. Kepka; Anthony Lobello; Jordan Malone; Rusty Smith | 6:51.703 |

* First place is awarded 34 points, second is awarded 21 points, third is awarded 13 points, fourth is awarded 8 points, fifth is awarded 5 points, sixth is awarded 3 points, seventh is awarded 2 points, and eighth is awarded 1 point in the finals of each individual race to determine the overall world champion. The relays do not count for the overall classification.

=== Women ===
| Event | Gold | | Silver | | Bronze | |
|---|---|---|---|---|---|---|
| Overall* | Jin Sun-yu; South Korea | 102 points | Wang Meng; China | 97 points | Kalyna Roberge; Canada | 34 points |
| 500 m | Wang Meng; China | 44.006 | Fu Tianyu; China | 44.070 | Kalyna Roberge; Canada | 44.116 |
| 1000 m | Jin Sun-yu; South Korea | 1:32.767 | Wang Meng; China | 1:32.874 | Kalyna Roberge; Canada | 1:33.204 |
| 1500 m | Jin Sun-yu; South Korea | 2:21.948 | Wang Meng; China | 2:22.027 | Choi Eun-kyung; South Korea | 2:22.152 |
| 3000 m relay | China; Cheng Xiaolei; Fu Tianyu; Wang Meng; Zhu Milei; Wang Wei | 4:17.194 | Canada; Alanna Kraus; Amanda Overland; Kalyna Roberge; Tania Vicent; Anouk Leblanc-Boucher | 4:17.335 | Italy; Marta Capurso; Arianna Fontana; Katia Zini; Mara Zini; Cecilia Maffei | 4:18.834 |

* First place is awarded 34 points, second is awarded 21 points, third is awarded 13 points, fourth is awarded 8 points, fifth is awarded 5 points, sixth is awarded 3 points, seventh is awarded 2 points and eighth is awarded 1 point in the finals of each individual race to determine the overall world champion. The relays do not count for the overall classification.

== Medal table ==
* Host nation (United States)

| Rank | Nation | Gold | Silver | Bronze | Total |
|---|---|---|---|---|---|
| 1 | South Korea | 6 | 3 | 3 | 12 |
| 2 | China | 2 | 6 | 0 | 8 |
| 3 | Canada | 2 | 1 | 5 | 8 |
| 4 | Italy | 0 | 0 | 1 | 1 |
| 4 | United States* | 0 | 0 | 1 | 1 |
| Totals (5 entries) | | 10 | 10 | 10 | 30 |
