= 2006 World Short Track Speed Skating Team Championships =

Short track team championship

- Location: Montreal, Canada
- Start date: 25 March 2005
- End date: 26 March 2005
- Competitors: 70 from 8 nations

The 2006 World Short Track Speed Skating Team Championships was the 16th edition of the World Short Track Speed Skating Team Championships, which took place on 25–26 March 2006 in Montreal, Canada.

Teams were divided into two brackets of four: the best team from each bracket qualified directly for the final, while the two next teams entered for the repechage round and the last was eliminated. The best two teams in the repechage round qualified for the final. Thus, the final consisted of four teams. Each team was represented by four athletes at both 500 m and 1000 m as well as by two athletes at 3000 m. There were four heats at both 500 m and 1000 m, whereby each heat consisted of athletes representing different countries. There was one heat at 3000 m.

== Medal winners ==
| Event | Gold | Silver | Bronze |
|---|---|---|---|
| Men | South Korea; Ahn Hyun-soo; Lee Ho-suk; Oh Se-jong; Seo Ho-jin; Song Suk-woo | Canada; Éric Bédard; Jonathan Guilmette; Charles Hamelin; François-Louis Tremblay; Mathieu Turcotte | China; Li Ye; Li Haonan; Sui Baoku; Cui Liang; Wang Baojian |
| Women | South Korea; Choi Eun-kyung; Jin Sun-yu; Kang Yun-mi; Byun Chun-sa; Jeon Da-hye | China; Wang Meng; Wang Wei; Cheng Xiaolei; Zhu Mi Lei; Fu Tianyu | Canada; Alanna Kraus; Anouk Leblanc-Boucher; Kalyna Roberge; Tania Vicent; Amanda Overland |

== Results ==
=== Men ===
| Rank | Nation | Total |
|---|---|---|
| 1st place, gold medalist(s) | South Korea | 39 |
| 2nd place, silver medalist(s) | Canada | 36 |
| 3rd place, bronze medalist(s) | China | 27 |
| 4 | Italy | 16 |
| 5 | United States | Rep. |
| 6 | Japan | Rep. |
| 7 | Netherlands | DNQ |

=== Women ===
| Rank | Nation | Total |
|---|---|---|
| 1st place, gold medalist(s) | South Korea | 40 |
| 2nd place, silver medalist(s) | China | 38 |
| 3rd place, bronze medalist(s) | Canada | 26 |
| 4 | Italy | 14 |
| 5 | Japan | Rep. |
| 6 | United States | Rep. |
| 7 | France | DNQ |
