= 2003 World Short Track Speed Skating Team Championships =

Short track team championship

- Location: Sofia, Bulgaria
- Start date: 15 March 2003
- End date: 16 March 2003

The 2003 World Short Track Speed Skating Team Championships is the 13th edition of the World Short Track Speed Skating Team Championships, which took place on 15-16 March 2003 in Sofia, Bulgaria.

Teams were divided into two brackets of four: the best team from each bracket qualified directly for the final, while the two next teams entered for the repechage round and the last was eliminated. The best two teams in the repechage round qualified for the final. Thus, the final consisted of four teams. Each team was represented by four athletes at both 500 m and 1000 m as well as by two athletes at 3000 m. There were four heats at both 500 m and 1000 m, whereby each heat consisted of athletes representing different countries. There was one heat at 3000 m.

== Medal winners ==
Event	Gold	Silver	Bronze
Men	Canada; Jonathan Guilmette; Jean-François Monette; Éric Bédard; Jeff Scholten; Mathieu Turcotte	South Korea; Ahn Hyun-soo; Lee Seung-jae; Oh Se-jong; Song Suk-woo; Yeo Jun-hyung	China; Li Ye; Guo Wei; Li Jiajun; Sui Baoku; Li Haonan
Women	South Korea; Kim Min-jung; Choi Eun-kyung; Ko Gi-hyun; Cho Ha-ri; Kim Min-jee	China; Wang Meng; Fu Tianyu; Wang Chunlu; Yang Yang (A); Liu Xiaoying	Italy; Evelina Rodigari; Katia Zini; Mara Zini; Catia Borrello; Marta Capurso

== Results ==
=== Men ===
Rank	Nation	Total
1st place, gold medalist(s)	Canada	42
2nd place, silver medalist(s)	South Korea	36
3rd place, bronze medalist(s)	China	22
4	Italy	16
5	Japan	Rep.
6	United States	Rep.
7	Bulgaria	DNQ
8	United Kingdom	DNQ

=== Women ===
Rank	Nation	Total
1st place, gold medalist(s)	South Korea	44
2nd place, silver medalist(s)	China	31
3rd place, bronze medalist(s)	Italy	22
4	Canada	21
5	Bulgaria	Rep.
6	United States	Rep.
7	Netherlands	DNQ
8	Russia	DNQ
