= 2000 World Short Track Speed Skating Team Championships =

Short track team championship

- Location: The Hague, Netherlands
- Start date: 4 March 2000
- End date: 5 March 2000

The 2000 World Short Track Speed Skating Team Championships is the 10th edition of the World Short Track Speed Skating Team Championships, which took place on 4-5 March 2000 in The Hague, Netherlands.

All teams were represented by four athletes at 500 m and 1000 m as well as by two athletes at 3000 m. At 500 m and 1000 m, athletes were drafted into the heats of four. At 3000 m, athletes were drafted into two heats. All athletes in each heat were from different countries. The best four team advanced for the relay competition.

== Medal winners ==
Event	Gold	Silver	Bronze
Men	Canada; Jonathan Guilmette; François-Louis Tremblay; Éric Bédard; Marc Gagnon; Mathieu Turcotte	South Korea; Kim Dong-Sung; Lee Jun-Hwan; Lee Seung-Jae; Min Ryoung; Oh Se-Jong	Italy; Maurizio Carnino; Nicola Franceschina; Michele Antonioli; Fabio Carta; Nicola Rodigari
Women	China; Wang Chunlu; Yang Yang (A); Yang Yang (S); Sun Dandan; Liu Xiaoying	South Korea; An Sang-Mi; Choi Min-Kyung; Joo Min-Jin; Park Hye-Won; Jeon Da-hye	Japan; Ikue Teshigawara; Chikage Tanaka; Yuka Kamino; Nobuko Yamada; Miyuki Ozawa

== Results ==
=== Men ===
Rank	Nation	Total
1st place, gold medalist(s)	Canada	46
2nd place, silver medalist(s)	South Korea	46
3rd place, bronze medalist(s)	Italy	37
4	China	28
5	United States	28
6	Japan	27
7	Netherlands	19

=== Women ===
Rank	Nation	Total
1st place, gold medalist(s)	China	60
2nd place, silver medalist(s)	South Korea	53
3rd place, bronze medalist(s)	Japan	34
4	Canada	30
5	Italy	25
6	United States	18
7	Netherlands	16
