= Short-track speed skating at the 2002 Winter Olympics – Women's 3000 metre relay =

Women's 3000 metre relay at the XIX Olympic Winter Games
- Pictogram for short track
- Venue: Salt Lake Ice Center
- Dates: 16–20 February 2002
- Competitors: 35 from 8 nations
- Winning time: 4:12.793

Medalists
1st place, gold medalist(s)		South Korea; Choi Eun-kyung; Choi Min-kyung; Park Hye-won; Joo Min-jin
2nd place, silver medalist(s)		China; Yang Yang (A); Yang Yang (S); Sun Dandan; Wang Chunlu
3rd place, bronze medalist(s)		Canada; Isabelle Charest; Alanna Kraus; Marie-Ève Drolet; Amélie Goulet-Nadon; Tania Vicent

The women's 3000 metre relay in short track speed skating at the 2002 Winter Olympics took place on 16 and 20 February at the Salt Lake Ice Center.

== Records ==
Prior to this competition, the existing world and Olympic records were as follows:

World record	China (CHN)	4:13.541	Calgary, Canada	19 October 2001
Olympic record	South Korea	4:16.260	Nagano, Japan	17 February 1998

The following new Olympic and world records were set during this competition.

Date	Round	Team	Time	OR	WR
16 February	Heat 1	South Korea; Choi Eun-kyung; Choi Min-kyung; Park Hye-won; Joo Min-jin	4:14.977	OR	
20 February	A Final	South Korea; Choi Eun-kyung; Choi Min-kyung; Park Hye-won; Joo Min-jin	4:12.793	OR	WR

== Results ==
=== Semifinals ===
The semi-finals were held on 16 February. The top two teams in each semifinal qualified for the A final, while the third and fourth place teams advanced to the B Final.

Semifinal 1

Rank	Country	Athletes	Time	Notes
1	China	Yang Yang (A); Yang Yang (S); Sun Dandan; Wang Chunlu	4:15.931	QA
2	Japan	Chikage Tanaka; Yuka Kamino; Ikue Teshigawara; Nobuko Yamada	4:17.968	QA
3	Italy	Katia Zini; Mara Zini; Evelina Rodigari; Marinella Canclini	4:18.131	QB
4	Germany	Yvonne Kunze; Christin Priebst; Ulrike Lehmann; Aika Klein	4:22.917	QB

Semifinal 2

Rank	Country	Athletes	Time	Notes
1	South Korea	Choi Eun-kyung; Choi Min-kyung; Park Hye-won; Joo Min-jin	4:14.977	QA OR
2	Canada	Isabelle Charest; Alanna Kraus; Tania Vicent; Marie-Ève Drolet	4:16.920	QA
3	Bulgaria	Evgeniya Radanova; Marina Georgieva-Nikolova; Anna Krasteva; Daniela Vlaeva	4:25.877	QB
4	United States	Julie Goskowicz; Caroline Hallisey; Amy Peterson; Erin Porter	4:36.002	QB

=== Finals ===
The four qualifying teams competed in Final A, while four others raced in Final B.

Final A

Rank	Country	Athletes	Time	Notes
1st place, gold medalist(s)	South Korea	Choi Eun-kyung; Choi Min-kyung; Park Hye-won; Joo Min-jin	4:12.793	WR
2nd place, silver medalist(s)	China	Yang Yang (A); Yang Yang (S); Sun Dandan; Wang Chunlu	4:13.236	
3rd place, bronze medalist(s)	Canada	Isabelle Charest; Alanna Kraus; Marie-Ève Drolet; Amélie Goulet-Nadon	4:15.738	
4	Japan	Chikage Tanaka; Yuka Kamino; Ikue Teshigawara; Atsuko Takata	4:21.107	

Final B

Rank	Country	Athletes	Time	Notes
5	Italy	Mara Zini; Evelina Rodigari; Marinella Canclini; Marta Capurso	4:20.014	
6	Bulgaria	Evgeniya Radanova; Marina Georgieva-Nikolova; Anna Krasteva; Daniela Vlaeva	4:20.703	
7	United States	Julie Goskowicz; Caroline Hallisey; Amy Peterson; Erin Porter	4:20.730	
8	Germany	Yvonne Kunze; Christin Priebst; Ulrike Lehmann; Aika Klein	4:22.222	
