= 2004 World Short Track Speed Skating Team Championships =

Short track team championship

- Location: St. Petersburg, Russia
- Start date: 13 March 2004
- End date: 14 March 2004

The 2004 World Short Track Speed Skating Team Championships is the 14th edition of the World Short Track Speed Skating Team Championships, which took place on 13-14 March 2004 in St. Petersburg, Russia.

Teams were divided into two brackets of four: the best team from each bracket qualified directly for the final, while the two next teams entered for the repechage round and the last was eliminated. The best two teams in the repechage round qualified for the final. Thus, the final consisted of four teams. Each team was represented by four athletes at both 500 m and 1000 m as well as by two athletes at 3000 m. There were four heats at both 500 m and 1000 m, whereby each heat consisted of athletes representing different countries. There was one heat at 3000 m.

== Medal winners ==
Event	Gold	Silver	Bronze
Men	South Korea; Ahn Hyun-soo; Lee Seung-jae; Seo Ho-jin; Song Suk-woo; Kim Hyun-kon	Canada; Jonathan Guilmette; Jean-François Monette; Charles Hamelin; Steve Robillard; Mathieu Turcotte	Italy; Nicola Rodigari; Nicola Franceschina; Fabio Carta; Michele Antonioli; Roberto Serra
Women	South Korea; Choi Eun-kyung; Ko Gi-hyun; Kim Min-jee; Byun Chun-sa; Cho Ha-ri	China; Liu Xiaoying; Fu Tianyu; Cheng Xiaolei; Wang Meng; Zhu Milei	Italy; Katia Zini; Mara Zini; Marta Capurso; Catia Borrello; Evelina Rodigari

== Results ==
=== Men ===
Rank	Nation	Total
1st place, gold medalist(s)	South Korea	42
2nd place, silver medalist(s)	Canada	34
3rd place, bronze medalist(s)	Italy	20
4	China	19
5	Japan	Rep.
6	Russia	Rep.
7	United Kingdom	DNQ
8	France	DNQ

=== Women ===
Rank	Nation	Total
1st place, gold medalist(s)	South Korea	47
2nd place, silver medalist(s)	China	37
3rd place, bronze medalist(s)	Italy	22
4	Canada	15
5	Russia	Rep.
6	Japan	Rep.
7	Hungary	DNQ
