= Canadian short track speed skating all-time medals list =

This is a compilation list of all the notable Canadian male and female all-time ISU World Short Track Speed Skating Championships and Olympic medal list in short track speed skating competition.

== Males ==
Athlete	Born	Olympics				World Ch.				Total			
Athlete	Born				Tot.				Tot.				Tot.
Charles Hamelin	1984	4	1	1	6	13	14	13	40	16	15	14	45
Marc Gagnon	1975	3	0	2	5	19	11	5	35	22	11	6	40
François-Louis Tremblay	1980	2	2	1	5	8	8	4	20	10	10	5	25
Éric Bédard	1976	2	1	1	4	7	8	2	17	10	8	3	21
Mathieu Turcotte	1977	1	1	1	3	7	6	3	16	8	7	1	19
Jonathan Guilmette	1978	1	2	0	3	4	10	1	15	5	12	1	18
Olivier Jean	1984	1	0	0	1	4	2	2	8	5	2	2	9
Samuel Girard	1996	1	0	1	2	0	5	1	6	1	5	2	8

== Females ==
Athlete	Born	Olympics				World Ch.				Total			
Athlete	Born				Tot.				Tot.				Tot.
Nathalie Lambert*	1963	1	2	0	3	16	?	?	?	?	?	?	?
Marianne St-Gelais	1990	0	3	0	3	1	11	4	16	1	15	4	20
Annie Perreault	1971	2	0	1	3	3	4	6	13	5	4	7	16
Kalyna Roberge	1986	0	2	0	2	2	2	12	16	2	3	12	17
Valérie Maltais	1990	0	1	0	1	1	5	6	12	1	6	6	13
Tania Vicent	1976	0	2	2	4	1	5	3	9	1	7	5	13
Kim Boutin	1994	0	1	2	3	0	1	5	6	0	2	7	9
Marie-Ève Drolet	1982	0	1	1	2	0	2	5	7	0	3	6	9
Isabelle Charest*	1971	0	1	2	3	2	2	2	?	?	?	?	?
Sylvie Daigle*	1962	1	1	0	2	?	?	?	?	?	?	?	?

* Incomplete data for Isabelle Charest, Sylvie Daigle, Nathalie Lambert.
