= Liu Yingbao =

Chinese short track speed skater

Medal record
Men's short track speed skating
Representing China
World Team Championships
Gold medal – first place	2002 Milwaukee	Team
Asian Winter Games
Silver medal – second place	2003 Misawa	5000m relay

Liu Yingbao (born 4 September 1988) is a Chinese former short track speed skater. He is a world champion of the World Team Championships.

Liu's World Cup podium was second place in the 500 m race at the 2002-03 World Cup stage in Chuncheon. He also won two team relays and once finished second in relay during the 2002-03 season. He participated only once at the World Championships: in 2002, he finished 6th at 500 m, 9th at 1500 m, 10th at 1000 m, and was 11th in the overall classification.
