= Jean-François Monette =

Short track speed skater

Personal information
- Born: October 28, 1978 (age 47) Pointe-aux-Trembles, Quebec, Canada

Sport
- Country: Canada
- Sport: Short track speed skating
Medal record
Men's short track speed skating
Representing Canada
World Championships
| Silver medal – second place | 2002 Montreal | Team relay |
| Silver medal – second place | 2003 Warsaw | Team relay |
| Silver medal – second place | 2007 Milan | Team relay |
| Silver medal – second place | 2008 Gangneung | Team relay |
| Bronze medal – third place | 2003 Warsaw | 1000 m |
World Team Championships
| Gold medal – first place | 2003 Sofia | Team |
| Gold medal – first place | 2007 Budapest | Team |
| Silver medal – second place | 2002 Milwaukee | Team |
| Silver medal – second place | 2008 Harbin | Team |
Junior World Championships
| Gold medal – first place | 1996 Courmayeur | Overall |

Jean-François Monette (born October 28, 1978) is a Canadian retired short track speed skater and five-time World Championships medallist.

== Career ==
Jean-François Monette started speed skating at the age of 9. The most notable achievement at the junior age is the gold medal of the 1996 World Championships.

During his career he did not manage to compete at the Winter Olympics. He fractured a vertebra three weeks prior to the selection for the 1998 Olympics. He was a reserve athlete in the 2002 Olympic team.

Monette's first World Cup podium was third place in the relay competition in Gothenburg during the 1999–2000 season. His first World Cup relay victory happened at the World Cup stage in Sofia during the 2001–02 season.

His senior career went up in 2002. During the 2002-03 World Cup season, he achieved seven personal podiums as well as four victories and two podiums in relay competitions. He also won the classification in 500 metres and was second in the 1000 m ranking as well as fourth in the general classification. Finally, he clinched two medals at the then-year's World Championships. He was selected as Speed Skating Canada's 2003 Male Skater of the Year - Short Track.

The 2003–04 season brought him his first personal victory (at 500 m in Mladá Boleslav), which was his only personal World Cup victory, and five personal podiums as well as three podiums in team relays. His best rankings were 12th in 500 m and 14th in the overall classification. During the 2004–05 season, Monette had one personal podium in 500 m and two team podiums in relay. He missed the 2005–06 season and therefore was not able to qualify for the 2006 Winter Olympics.

During the 2006–07 season, Monette only once shared a silver medal in relay. The 2007–08 season became last active season in his career, during which he won one bronze in relay. In March 2008 he announced about his retirement that was caused by a pair of concussions suffered previous February and a knee injury that had been slow to heal, though he considered to compete for the spot at the 2010 Winter Olympics in his home country.

In 2022, Monette acted as a panel member of the ISU Disciplinary Commission.

== Personal life ==
Monette graduated with a law degree from the University of Montreal in May 2007 and studied notary law afterwards.
