= Yeo Jun-hyung =

South Korean short track speed skater

Personal information
- Born: 여준형; 25 September 1983 (age 43) Seoul, South Korea
Medal record
Men's short track speed skating
Representing South Korea
World Championships
| Gold medal – first place | 2003 Warsaw | 5000m relay |
World Team Championships
| Silver medal – second place | 2003 Sofia | Team |
Asian Winter Games
| Gold medal – first place | 2003 Misawa | 5000m relay |
Universiade
| Gold medal – first place | 2005 Innsbruck | 5000m relay |

Yeo Jun-hyung (born 25 September 1983) is a South Korean former short track speed skater. He is World Champion, Asian Winter Games champion and Universiade champion.

Yeo's only individual World Cup podium was second place in the 1000 m race at the 2002-03 World Cup stage in Chuncheon. He also finished once second and once third in relay competitions during the next two seasons (one podium by season). He participated only once at the World Championships: in 2002, he won gold in the men's relay.

In 2012, Yeo was named as US National Team interim coach. In 2014, he worked as coach in South Korea.
