= Adam Riedy =

Short track speed skater

Personal information
- Born: December 13, 1981 (age 44) Lakewood, Ohio, U.S.

Sport
- Sport: Short track speed skating

Adam Riedy (born December 13, 1981) is a short track speed skater from the United States. His major international success came in December 2000 when he finished third in a 1000 m race at the 2000-01 World Cup stage in Nobeyama. He was also twice bronze medalist in relay competitions.

He failed to qualify for the 2002 Olympics, which became the reason for him to retire from sports.
