= Ward Janssens =

Belgian speed skater

Personal information
- Nationality: Polish
- Born: 13 July 1982 (age 43) Bruges, Belgium
- Height: 178 cm (5 ft 10 in)

Sport
- Sport: Short track speed skating
Medal record
Men's short track speed skating
Representing Belgium
European Championships
Silver medal – second place	2002 Grenoble	5000 m Relay

Ward Janssens (born 13 July 1982) is a Belgian short track speed skater. He competed in the men's 5000 metre relay event at the 2002 Winter Olympics.
