= Guo Wei (speed skater) =

Chinese short track speed skater

Medal record

Men's short track speed skating

Representing China

Olympic Games
| Bronze medal – third place | 2002 Salt Lake City | 5000 m relay |

World Championships
| Bronze medal – third place | 2002 Montreal | 5000 m relay |
| Bronze medal – third place | 2003 Warsaw | 5000 m relay |

World Team Championships
| Gold medal – first place | 2002 Milwaukee | Team |
| Bronze medal – third place | 2003 Sofia | Team |

Guo Wei (Chinese: 郭偉, born 31 July 1983) is a Chinese short track speed skater.

At the 2002 Winter Olympics he won a bronze medal in 5000 m relay, together with teammates Feng Kai, Li Jiajun, and Li Ye.
