= 2004 World Short Track Speed Skating Championships =

The 2004 World Short Track Speed Skating Championships took place between March 17 and 19, 2004 in Gothenburg, Sweden. The World Championships are organised by the ISU which also run world cups and championships in speed skating and figure skating.

== Results ==
=== Men ===
Event	Gold		Silver		Bronze	
Overall*	Ahn Hyun-soo; South Korea	102 points	Song Suk-woo; South Korea	68 points	Li Jiajun; China	29 points
500 m	Song Suk-woo; South Korea	42.599	Li Haonan; China	42.667	Li Ye; China	43.420
1000 m	Ahn Hyun-soo; South Korea	1:26.813	Li Jiajun; China	1:27.162	Fabio Carta; Italy	1:28.002
1500 m	Ahn Hyun-soo; South Korea	2:16.376	Jonathan Guilmette; Canada	2:16.418	Song Suk-woo; South Korea	2:16.657
3000 m	Ahn Hyun-soo; South Korea	5:03.670	Song Suk-woo; South Korea	5:09.807	Li Ye; China	5:10.089
5000 m relay	South Korea; Ahn Hyun-soo; Song Suk-woo; Cho Nam-kyu; Kim Hyun-kon	6:48.133	China; Sui Baoku; Li Jiajun; Li Haonan; Li Ye	6:49.232	Italy; Roberto Serra; Nicola Franceschina; Nicola Rodigari; Fabio Carta	6:49.563

* First place is awarded 34 points, second is awarded 21 points, third is awarded 13 points, fourth is awarded 8 points, fifth is awarded 5 points, sixth is awarded 3 points, seventh is awarded 2 points, and eighth is awarded 1 point in the finals of each individual race to determine the overall world champion. The relays do not count for the overall classification.

=== Women ===
Event	Gold		Silver		Bronze	
Overall*	Choi Eun-kyung; South Korea	84 points	Wang Meng; China	60 points	Byun Chun-sa; South Korea	55 points
500 m	Wang Meng; China	45.332	Marta Capurso; Italy	45.482	Choi Eun-kyung; South Korea	45.516
1000 m	Choi Eun-kyung; South Korea	1:34.724	Byun Chun-sa; South Korea	1:34.806	Fu Tian Yu; China	1:35.033
1500 m	Choi Eun-kyung; South Korea	2:28.048	Wang Meng; China	2:28.299	Alanna Kraus; Canada	2:29.573
3000 m	Byun Chun-sa; South Korea	5:58.035	Fu Tian Yu; China	5:58.344	Marta Capurso; Italy	5:58.448
3000 m relay^{†}	South Korea; Ko Gi-hyun; Kim Min-jee; Choi Eun-kyung; Byun Chun-sa	4:20.985	China; Cheng Xiao Lei; Fu Tian Yu; Liu Xiaoying; Wang Meng	4:21.112	Italy; Mara Zini; Katia Zini; Catia Borrello; Marta Capurso	DQ

^{†} In the final of the Women's 3000 m relay, the Italian team was disqualified.

* First place is awarded 34 points, second is awarded 21 points, third is awarded 13 points, fourth is awarded 8 points, fifth is awarded 5 points, sixth is awarded 3 points, seventh is awarded 2 points, and eighth is awarded 1 point in the finals of each individual race to determine the overall world champion. The relays do not count for the overall classification.

== Medal table ==
Rank	Nation	Gold	Silver	Bronze	Total
1	South Korea (KOR)	11	3	3	17
2	China (CHN)	1	7	4	12
3	Italy (ITA)	0	1	4	5
4	Canada (CAN)	0	1	1	2
Totals (4 entries)		12	12	12	36
