= 2003 World Short Track Speed Skating Championships =

The 2003 World Short Track Speed Skating Championships took place between March 21 and 23, 2003 in Warsaw, Poland. The World Championships are organised by the ISU which also run world cups and championships in speed skating and figure skating.

== Results ==
=== Men ===
Event	Gold		Silver		Bronze	
Overall*	Ahn Hyun-soo; South Korea	89 points	Li Jiajun; China	76 points	Song Suk-woo; South Korea	52 points
500 m	Li Jiajun; China	43.210	Li Ye; China	43.291	Song Suk-woo; South Korea	43.377
1000 m	Li Jiajun; China	1:28.391	Ahn Hyun-soo (flag) South Korea	1:28.450	Jean-François Monette; Canada	1:28.510
1500 m	Ahn Hyun-soo; South Korea	2:25.271	Song Suk-woo; South Korea	2:25.326	Lee Seung-jae; South Korea	2:25.390
3000 m	Ahn Hyun-soo; South Korea	4:58.297	Apolo Anton Ohno; United States	4:58.699	Song Suk-woo; South Korea	4:59.035
5000 m relay	South Korea; Yeo Jun-hyung; Ahn Hyun-soo; Oh Se-jong; Lee Seung-jae	6:55.975	Canada; Mathieu Turcotte; Jean-François Monette; Jonathan Guilmette; Éric Bédard	6:56.465	China; Sui Baoku; Li Jiajun; Li Haonan; Li Ye	6:57.052

* First place is awarded 34 points, second is awarded 21 points, third is awarded 13 points, fourth is awarded 8 points, fifth is awarded 5 points, sixth is awarded 3 points, seventh is awarded 2 points, and eighth is awarded 1 point in the finals of each individual race to determine the overall world champion. The relays do not count for the overall classification.

=== Women ===
Event	Gold		Silver		Bronze	
Overall*	Choi Eun-kyung; South Korea	76 points	Yang Yang (A); China	68 points	Kim Min-jee; South Korea	55 points
500 m	Yang Yang (A); China	46.270	Amélie Goulet-Nadon; Canada	46.314	Fu Tian Yu; China	46.319
1000 m	Evgenia Radanova; Bulgaria	1:31.594	Choi Eun-kyung; South Korea	1:31.709	Yang Yang (A); China	1:31.784
1500 m	Choi Eun-kyung; South Korea	2:24.866	Kim Min-jee; South Korea	2:24.942	Yang Yang (A); China	2:25.147
3000 m	Kim Min-jee; South Korea	5:31.650	Choi Eun-kyung; South Korea	5:31.660	Cho Ha-ri; South Korea	5:31.755
3000 m relay	China; Wang Chunlu; Fu Tian Yu; Yang Yang (A); Wang Meng	4:22.030	Canada; Tania Vicent; Alanna Kraus; Annie Perreault; Amélie Goulet-Nadon	4:22.653	Bulgaria; Anna Krasteva; Daniela Vlaeva; Evgenia Radanova; Marina Georgieva-Nikolova	4:23.600

* First place is awarded 34 points, second is awarded 21 points, third is awarded 13 points, fourth is awarded 8 points, fifth is awarded 5 points, sixth is awarded 3 points, seventh is awarded 2 points, and eighth is awarded 1 point in the finals of each individual race to determine the overall world champion. The relays do not count for the overall classification.

== Medal table ==
Rank	Nation	Gold	Silver	Bronze	Total
1	South Korea (KOR)	7	5	6	18
2	China (CHN)	4	3	4	11
3	Bulgaria (BUL)	1	0	1	2
4	Canada (CAN)	0	3	1	4
5	United States (USA)	0	1	0	1
Totals (5 entries)		12	12	12	36
