= Cho Ha-ri =

South Korean speed skater (born 1986)

Cho Ha-Ri
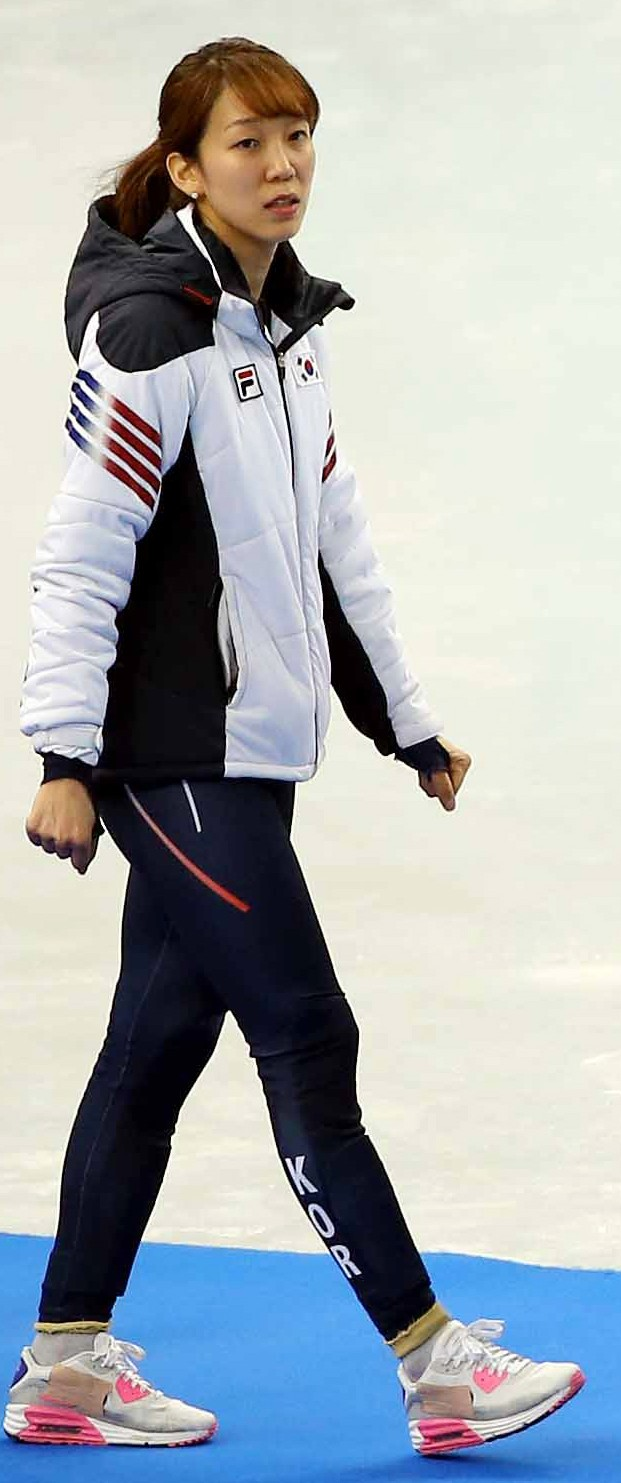
- Cho Ha-Ri in 2014

Personal information
- Born: 29 July 1986 (age 39) Seoul, South Korea
- Height: 1.67 m (5 ft 6 in)
- Weight: 54 kg (119 lb)

Sport
- Country: South Korea
- Sport: Short track speed skating
- Club: Goyang City Hall

Achievements and titles
- World finals: 2011 Overall
Medal record
Women's short track speed skating
Representing South Korea
Event	1st	2nd	3rd
Olympic Games	1	0	0
World Championships	6	2	5
World Team Championships	4	0	0
Asian Games	2	3	1
Olympic Games
Gold medal – first place	2014 Sochi	3000 m relay
World Championships
Gold medal – first place	2004 Gothenburg	3000 m relay
Gold medal – first place	2010 Sofia	3000 m relay
Gold medal – first place	2011 Sheffield	Overall
Gold medal – first place	2011 Sheffield	1000 m
Gold medal – first place	2011 Sheffield	3000 m
Gold medal – first place	2012 Shanghai	1000 m
Silver medal – second place	2010 Sofia	1000 m
Silver medal – second place	2010 Sofia	3000 m
Bronze medal – third place	2003 Warsaw	3000 m
Bronze medal – third place	2010 Sofia	Overall
Bronze medal – third place	2010 Sofia	1500 m
Bronze medal – third place	2011 Sheffield	1500 m
Bronze medal – third place	2012 Shanghai	3000 m Relay
World Team Championships
Gold medal – first place	2003 Sofia	Team
Gold medal – first place	2004 St. Petersberg	Team
Gold medal – first place	2010 Bormio	Team
Gold medal – first place	2011 Warsaw	Team
Winter Universiade
Silver medal – second place	2007 Turin	1000 m
Silver medal – second place	2007 Turin	1500 m
Asian Winter Games
Gold medal – first place	2003 Aomori	3000 m relay
Gold medal – first place	2011 Astana-Almaty	1500 m
Silver medal – second place	2003 Aomori	1500 m
Silver medal – second place	2011 Astana-Almaty	1000 m
Silver medal – second place	2011 Astana-Almaty	3000 m relay
Bronze medal – third place	2003 Aomori	1000 m
World Junior Championships
Bronze medal – third place	2002 Chuncheon	Overall

Cho Ha-Ri (Korean: 조해리; Hanja: 趙海利; pronounced [tɕo.ɦɛ̝.ɾi]; born 29 July 1986) is a short track speed skater who competes for South Korea. She is the 2011 Overall World Champion.

== Career ==
At the 2010 Winter Olympics, Cho finished 4th in the women's 1000 metres and 5th in the 1500 metres. Later that same season, she placed third in the standings for the overall title at the 2010 World Short Track Speed Skating Championships, capturing silver in the 1000 m and 3000 m races, and third in the 1500 m.

At the 2011 World Short Track Speed Skating Championships, Cho won the overall World Championship title, winning the 1000 m and 3000 m races, and finished third in the 1500 m race to capture the overall title. In the following week, Cho helped Korea to win the 2011 World Team Championships (last one to be scheduled into foreseeable future) held in Warsaw.She was part of the Short Track Speed Skating team in the '3000m relay' that won a gold medal in the 2014 Winter Olympics.
