= Andrew McNee (speed skater) =

Australian speed skater

Personal information
- Nationality: Australian
- Born: 11 December 1979 (age 45); Adelaide, Australia

Sport
- Sport: Short track speed skating

Andrew McNee (born 11 December 1979) is an Australian short track speed skater. He competed in two events at the 2002 Winter Olympics.
