= Li Ye (speed skater) =

Chinese short track speed skater

Personal information
- Born: 26 December 1983 (age 42) Changchun, Jilin, China
Medal record
Men's short track speed skating
Representing China
Olympic Games
Bronze medal – third place	2002 Salt Lake City	5000 m relay
World Championships
Silver medal – second place	2003 Warsaw	500 m
Silver medal – second place	2004 Gothenburg	5000 m relay
Bronze medal – third place	2001 Jeonju	5000 m relay
Bronze medal – third place	2002 Montreal	5000 m relay
Bronze medal – third place	2003 Warsaw	5000 m relay
Bronze medal – third place	2004 Gothenburg	500 m
Bronze medal – third place	2004 Gothenburg	3000 m
World Team Championships
Gold medal – first place	2002 Milwaukee	Team
Silver medal – second place	2001 Minamimaki	Team
Bronze medal – third place	2003 Sofia	Team
Bronze medal – third place	2005 Chuncheon	Team
Bronze medal – third place	2006 Montreal	Team
Asian Games
Silver medal – second place	2003 Aomori	1000 m
Silver medal – second place	2003 Aomori	5000 m relay
Silver medal – second place	2007 Changchun	5000 m relay
Bronze medal – third place	2007 Changchun	1500 m
Bronze medal – third place	2007 Changchun	500 m
World Junior Championships
Silver medal – second place	2001 Warsaw	2000 m relay

Li Ye (Chinese: 李野; pinyin: Lǐ Yě; born 26 December 1983 in Changchun, Jilin) is a Chinese short track speed skater.

At the 2002 Winter Olympics he won a bronze medal in 5000 m relay, together with teammates Feng Kai, Li Jiajun and Guo Wei.

At the 2006 Winter Olympics he finished fifth in 1000 m and 5000 m relay. He reached the A final in 1500 metres, but was disqualified there.
