= Alex McEwan =

Australian speed skater

Personal information
- Full name: Alexander McEwan
- Born: 19 July 1977 (age 47); Melbourne, Australia
- Height: 162 cm (5 ft 4 in)

Sport
- Country: Australia
- Sport: Short track speed skating

Alexander McEwan (born 19 July 1977) is an Australian short track speed skater. He competed at the 2002 Winter Olympics and the 2006 Winter Olympics.
