= Dan Weinstein (speed skater) =

American speed skater (born 1981)

Medal record

Men's short track speed skating

Representing United States

World Championships
| Gold medal – first place | 2001 Jeonju | 5000 m relay |
| Silver medal – second place | 2000 Sheffield | 500 m |
| Bronze medal – third place | 2000 Sheffield | 1000 m |
| Bronze medal – third place | 2000 Sheffield | 3000 m |

World Junior Championships
| Silver medal – second place | 1997 Marquette | 500 m |
| Silver medal – second place | 1997 Marquette | 1500 m S.F |
| Bronze medal – third place | 1997 Marquette | Overall |

Daniel Weinstein (born February 4, 1981) is a retired American short track speed skating competitor and two-time Olympian.

== Biography ==
Of the handful of Jewish-American Olympians who competed in the 1998 Winter Olympics at Nagano, Japan, Weinstein was by far the youngest. At 17 years of age, he was not only the youngest athlete on the U.S. speedskating team, he was also the youngest man on the entire U.S. Winter Olympics Team. Four years later, Weinstein competed in the 2002 Winter Olympics in Salt Lake City, Utah.

Weinstein has won multiple individual distance US Championships, and he won the men's overall title at the 2000 U.S. Short Track Speedskating Championships.

In 1994, Weinstein was the youngest person to ever skate in the Olympic trials, but he placed poorly.

Raised in Brookline, Massachusetts, he began skating at age eight, after his parents saw an article about local speedskating in the Boston Globe.

He completed his bachelor's degree at Harvard University in 2004, and his MBA at The Tuck School of Business at Dartmouth in 2009.

== See also ==
- List of select Jewish speed skaters

== Sources ==
- Jewish Sports profile
- Dan Weinstein '03: Go Speed Racer Go, Harvard Crimson, March 2, 2000 (via Google Cache)
- Dan Weinstein at ISU
- Dan Weinstein at the-sports.org
