= Liu Xiaoying =

Former Chinese female short track speed skater

Personal information
- Nationality: Chinese

Sport
- Sport: Short track speed skating
Medal record
Women's short track speed skating
Representing China
World Championships
Silver medal – second place	2004 Gothenburg	3000 m relay
World Team Championships
Gold medal – first place	1999 St. Louis	Team
Gold medal – first place	2000 The Hague	Team
Silver medal – second place	2002 Milwaukee	Team
Silver medal – second place	2003 Sofia	Team
Silver medal – second place	2004 St. Petersburg	Team

Liu Xiaoying is a former Chinese female short track speed skater. She is a silver medallist of the 2004 World Championships in women's relay as well as two-time World Champion in team competitions. She also achieved a number of World Cup podium places.
