= Wang Wei (speed skater) =

Former Chinese female short track speed skater

Personal information
- Nationality: Chinese

Sport
- Sport: Short track speed skating
Medal record
Women's short track speed skating
Representing China
World Team Championships
Silver medal – second place	2002 Milwaukee	Team
Silver medal – second place	2006 Montreal	Team
Universiade
Bronze medal – third place	2005 Innsbruck	1500 m
Bronze medal – third place	2005 Innsbruck	3000 m relay

Wang Wei is a former Chinese female short track speed skater. She is a two-time silver medallist of the World Team Championships and a two-time bronze medallist of the 2005 Winter Universiade. During the 2002–03 World Cup season, Wang won two races at the World Cup stage in Salt Lake City. She also achieved one podium during the 2003–04 World Cup season in Jeonju. She won the 1500 m race and finished second in the 1000 m race at the 2004–05 World Cup's stage in Saguenay.
