= Joo Min-jin =

Short track speed skater

Medal record

Women's short track speed skating

Representing South Korea

Olympic Games
Gold medal – first place	2002 Salt Lake City	3000 m relay

World Championships
Gold medal – first place	2002 Montreal	3000 m relay
Silver medal – second place	2000 Sheffield	3000 m relay
Bronze medal – third place	2000 Sheffield	1000 m
Bronze medal – third place	2000 Sheffield	1500 m

World Team Championships
Gold medal – first place	2002 Milwaukee	Team
Silver medal – second place	2000 The Hague	Team
Silver medal – second place	2001 Minamimaki	Team

Asian Winter Games
Gold medal – first place	2003 Aomori	3000 m relay

World Junior Championships
Gold medal – first place	1999 Montréal	Overall
Gold medal – first place	1998 St. Louis	Overall

Joo Min-jin (Korean: 주민진; Hanja: 朱敏眞; born 1 August 1983 in Seoul) is a retired South Korean short track speed skater.

She won a gold medal in the 3000 metre relay at the 2002 Winter Olympics, together with teammates Choi Eun-kyung, Park Hye-won, and Choi Min-kyung.
