= Ron Biondo =

American short track speed skater

Medal record

Men's short track speed skating

Representing the United States

World Championships
Gold medal – first place	2001 Jeonju	5000 m relay
Bronze medal – third place	2002 Montréal	500 m

Ron Biondo (born August 10, 1981 in Broadview Heights, Ohio) is a short track speed skater from the United States who won bronze in the 500 m at the 2002 World Short Track Speed Skating Championships.
