= Stephen Lee (speed skater) =

Australian speed skater

Stephen Lee (born 5 January 1978 in Brisbane) is an Australian short track speed skater. He has competed at the 2002 and 2006 Winter Olympics and the 2005 World Championships in China.

He is a news cameraman for Channel 7 in Brisbane when not skating.
