= Kim Min-jee (speed skater) =

South Korean speed skater

Medal record

Women's short track speed skating

Representing South Korea

World Championships
Gold medal – first place	2004 Gothenburg	3000 m relay
Gold medal – first place	2004 St. Petersberg	Team
Gold medal – first place	2003 Warsaw	3000 m
Gold medal – first place	2003 Sofia	Team
Silver medal – second place	2003 Warsaw	1500 m
Bronze medal – third place	2003 Warsaw	Overall

World Junior Championships
Gold medal – first place	2002 Chuncheon	Overall

Asian Winter Games
Gold medal – first place	2003 Aomori	3000 m relay
Bronze medal – third place	2003 Aomori	3000 m

Kim Min-Jee (Korean: 김민지; born January 7, 1986) is a South Korean short track speed skater.
