= Alanna Kraus =

Canadian short track speed skater

Medal record

Women's short track speed skating

Representing Canada

Olympic Games
Silver medal – second place	2006 Turin	3000 m relay
Bronze medal – third place	2002 Salt Lake City	3000 m relay

World Championships
Gold medal – first place	2005 Beijing	3000 m relay
Silver medal – second place	2003 Warsaw	3000 m relay
Silver medal – second place	2006 Minneapolis	3000 m relay
Bronze medal – third place	2000 Sheffield	3000 m relay
Bronze medal – third place	2004 Gothenburg	1500 m

World Team Championships
Bronze medal – third place	2001 Nobeyama	Team
Bronze medal – third place	2002 Milwaukee	Team
Bronze medal – third place	2005 Chuncheon	Team
Bronze medal – third place	2006 Montreal	Team

Goodwill Games
Silver medal – second place	2000 Lake Placid	3000 m relay

Alanna Kraus (born June 30, 1977 in Abbotsford, British Columbia) is a Canadian short track speed skater.

== Career achievements ==
She won the bronze medal at the 2002 Winter Olympics in short-track speed skating for the women's 3000 m relay. She competed in three individual events at the 2002 Games. In the 500 m she placed 6th; 8th in the 1000 m and 5th in the 1500 m. She was also a silver medallist at the 2000 Goodwill Winter Games.

In the 2006 Winter Olympics she won silver as part of the short track relay team in the 3000 meter race with Tania Vicent, Kalyna Roberge, and Anouk Leblanc-Boucher. In her only individual event at the Games, the 500 she placed 9th. She won a silver medal in the relay event at the 2006 World Championships.

Personal records
Women's short track speed skating
Event	Result	Date	Location	Notes
500 m	43.839	2005-11-12	Bormio	
1000 m	1:31.130	2004-11-21	Calgary	
1500 m	2:22.640	2004-11-19	Calgary	

== Personal life ==
Kraus first started speed skating at age four. She is one of many Olympic athletes to come from the National Sport School based in Calgary, Alberta.
