= Song Suk-woo =

Short track speed skater

Chae Ji-hoon
Personal information
- Born: 1 March 1983 (age 43)

Sport
- Country: South Korea
- Sport: Short track speed skating
Medal record
Men's short track speed skating
Representing South Korea
Olympic Games
Gold medal – first place	2006 Turin	5000 m relay
World Championships
Gold medal – first place	2004 Gothenburg	500 m
Gold medal – first place	2004 Gothenburg	5000 m relay
Silver medal – second place	2003 Warsaw	1500 m
Silver medal – second place	2004 Gothenburg	Overall
Silver medal – second place	2004 Gothenburg	3000 m
Bronze medal – third place	2003 Warsaw	Overall
Bronze medal – third place	2003 Warsaw	500 m
Bronze medal – third place	2003 Warsaw	3000 m
Bronze medal – third place	2004 Gothenburg	1500 m
World Team Championships
Gold medal – first place	2004 St. Petersburg	Team
Gold medal – first place	2006 Montreal	Team
Silver medal – second place	2003 Sofia	Team
Winter Universiade
Gold medal – first place	2005 Innsbruck	500 m
Gold medal – first place	2005 Innsbruck	5000 m relay
Silver medal – second place	2005 Innsbruck	1500 m
Asian Winter Games
Gold medal – first place	2003 Aomori	3000 m
Gold medal – first place	2003 Aomori	5000 m relay
Bronze medal – third place	2003 Aomori	500 m

Song Suk-Woo (Korean: 송석우; Hanja: 宋錫雨, born 1 March 1983) is a South Korean short track speed skater who won gold in the 5000m relay at the 2006 Winter Olympics in Turin.
