= Ko Gi-hyun =

South Korean short-track speed skater (born 1986)

Personal information
- Born: May 11, 1986 (age 40)
- Height: 168 cm (5 ft 6 in)
- Weight: 58 kg (128 lb)

Sport
- Sport: Short-track speed skating
Medal record
Women's short-track speed skating
Representing South Korea
Olympic Games
Gold medal – first place	2002 Salt Lake City	1500 m
Silver medal – second place	2002 Salt Lake City	1000 m
World Championships
Gold medal – first place	2002 Montréal	3000 m relay
Gold medal – first place	2004 Gothenburg	3000 m relay
Silver medal – second place	2002 Montréal	Overall
Silver medal – second place	2002 Montréal	1000 m
Silver medal – second place	2002 Montréal	1500 m
Bronze medal – third place	2002 Montréal	3000 m
World Team Championships
Gold medal – first place	2002 Milwaukee	Team
Gold medal – first place	2003 Sofia	Team
Gold medal – first place	2004 St. Petersburg	Team

Ko Gi-Hyun (Korean: 고기현; Hanja: 高基鉉; born May 11, 1986) is a South Korean short-track speed skater. Ko remains the second youngest individual gold medalist after Tara Lipinski in the history of the Olympic Winter Games, winning gold in women's 1500 m event at the 2002 Winter Olympics in Salt Lake City, at 15 years and 277 days old.
