= Jeff Scholten =

Short track speed skater

Personal information
- Born: November 6, 1977 (age 48) Canada

Sport
- Sport: Short track speed skating
Medal record
Men's short track speed skating
Representing Canada
World Championships
Bronze medal – third place	1999 Sofia	5000 m relay
World Team Championships
Gold medal – first place	2003 Sofia	Team

Jeff Scholten (born November 6, 1977) is a Canadian short track speed skater who won bronze in the 5000m relay at the 1999 World Championships in Sofia. At the 2003 World Team Championships in Sofia, he won gold with the Canadian team.

Scholten had also several successes at the World Cup, including 3 personal and one team victories. The first podium was during the 1999-00 season when he finished second in the 3000m race in Gothenburg. At the next World Cup leg in Heerenveen, he won in 500m race.
