= Park Hye-won =

Short track speed skater

Medal record

Women's short track speed skating

Representing South Korea

Olympic Games
Gold medal – first place	2002 Salt Lake City	3000 m relay

World Championships
Gold medal – first place	2002 Montreal	3000 m relay
Gold medal – first place	2002 Milwaukee	Team
Silver medal – second place	2000 Sheffield	1500 m
Silver medal – second place	2000 Sheffield	3000 m relay
Silver medal – second place	2000 The Hague	Team
Silver medal – second place	2001 Jeonju	3000 m relay
Silver medal – second place	2001 Nobeyama	Team

Winter Universiade
Gold medal – first place	2003 Tarvisio	3000 m relay

Park Hye-won (Korean: 박혜원; Hanja: 朴慧園; born August 15, 1983, in Seoul) is a retired South Korean short track speed skater.

== Early career ==
Park started skating at the age of 10. In 1997, at 14, she was first called up to the South Korean national short track speed skating team for the 1998 Asian Short Track Speed Skating Championships where she won gold medals in the 3000 metres and 3000 metre relay.

In 1998, Park claimed her spot in Team Korea, ranked 1st in the national trials, and then she competed in the 1998–99 Short Track Speed Skating World Cup series. At the first event held in the Netherlands, Park finished 1st in the 1500 metre race, beating Yang Yang (A). However, at the second event in Hungary, she tore her hamstring, bumping with a British opponent during a race, and was sidelined for a whole year.

== 1999–2001 ==
In 1999, Park came back from the hamstring injury and participated in the Asian Short Track Speed Skating Championships. She won four gold medals (1000 metres, 1500 metres, 3000 metres, and 3000 metre relay), sweeping all the women's events except for the 500 metres. During the 1999–2000 World Cup, Park won two gold medals in the 3000 metres and one silver in the 1500 metres.

In 2000, Park won two silver medals (3000 metre relay and 1500 metres) at the 2000 World Short Track Speed Skating Championships held in Sheffield, England, and added another silver at the World Team Championships held in The Hague, Netherlands. She set the 3000 metre unofficial world record and current Korean national record of an astonishing 4:42.15, a time considered far out of reach of even the best present athletes, on April 8, 2000, in the Korean national championships.

In 2001, Park captured another 3000 metre gold medal on December 17 in the fifth event of the 2001–02 World Cup held in Amsterdam, finishing the race ahead of Yang Yang (A) with a margin of 16 seconds.

== 2002 Winter Olympics ==
Park first participated at the Winter Olympics in February 2002. Since the 3000 metre individual race had not been a part of Olympic events, the 3000 metre specialist competed only in the 3000 metre relay at the 2002 Winter Olympics, combining with Choi Eun-kyung, Choi Min-kyung, and Joo Min-jin. Team Korea eventually won its third consecutive Olympic women's 3000 metre relay gold medal, setting the new world record in the final race.

In April 2002, at the 2002 World Championships, Park led the Korean relay team to its first world championship in the history of the team.

== Retirement ==
Upon entering college at Sungshin Women's University after the Olympics, Park focused mainly on her studies. After winning gold in the 3000 metre relay at the 2003 Winter Universiade, Park retired from skating.
