= Oh Se-jong =

South Korean short track speed skater

Personal information
- Born: 9 October 1982 Seoul, South Korea
- Died: 27 June 2016 (aged 33) Seoul, South Korea
- Height: 180 cm (5 ft 11 in)
- Weight: 69 kg (152 lb)

Sport
- Country: South Korea
- Sport: Short track speed skating
Medal record
Men's short track speed skating
Representing South Korea
Olympic Games
Gold medal – first place	2006 Turin	5000 m relay
World Championships
Gold medal – first place	2003 Warsaw	5000 m relay
Gold medal – first place	2006 Montréal	Team
Silver medal – second place	2000 The Hague	Team
Silver medal – second place	2003 Sofia	Team
Bronze medal – third place	2001 Minamimaki	Team
Bronze medal – third place	2006 Minneapolis	1500 m
Bronze medal – third place	2006 Minneapolis	3000 m
Asian Games
Gold medal – first place	2003 Misawa	5000 m

Oh Se-jong (Korean: 오세종; Hanja: 呉世種; 9 October 1982 – 27 June 2016) was a South Korean short track speed skater who won gold in the 5000 m relay at the 2006 Winter Olympics in Turin. He also competed in 5000 m relay at the 2002 Winter Olympics in Salt Lake City. He died in a traffic accident on 27 June 2016 in Seoul, South Korea.
