= 2000 World Short Track Speed Skating Championships =

The 2000 World Short Track Speed Skating Championships took place between March 10 and 12, 2000 in Sheffield, United Kingdom. The World Championships are organised by the ISU which also run world cups and championships in speed skating and figure skating.

== Results ==
=== Men ===
| Event | Gold | | Silver | | Bronze | |
|---|---|---|---|---|---|---|
| Overall* | Min Ryoung; South Korea | 68 points | Éric Bédard; Canada | 63 points | Li Jiajun; China | 60 points |
| 500 m | Éric Bédard; Canada | 42.009 | Daniel Weinstein; United States | 42.058 | Satoru Terao; Japan | 42.157 |
| 1000 m | Li Jiajun; China | 1:31.098 | An Yulong; China | 1:31.212 | Daniel Weinstein; United States | 1:33.228 |
| 1500 m | Min Ryoung; South Korea | 2:23.098 | Éric Bédard; Canada | 2:23.200 | Satoru Terao; Japan | 2:23.286 |
| 3000 m | Min Ryoung; South Korea | 5:02.496 | Li Jiajun; China | 5:02.934 | Daniel Weinstein; United States | 5:03.416 |
| 5000 m relay | China | 7:09.387 | Japan | 7:09.705 | Italy | 7:09.709 |

* First place is awarded 34 points, second is awarded 21 points, third is awarded 13 points, fourth is awarded 8 points, fifth is awarded 5 points, sixth is awarded 3 points, seventh is awarded 2 points, and eighth is awarded 1 point in the finals of each individual race to determine the overall world champion. The relays do not count for the overall classification.

=== Women ===
| Event | Gold | | Silver | | Bronze | |
|---|---|---|---|---|---|---|
| Overall* | Yang Yang (A); China | 89 points | An Sang-mi; South Korea | 52 points | Yang Yang (S); China | 47 points |
| 500 m | Evgenia Radanova; Bulgaria | 44.626 | Yang Yang (S); China | 44.704 | An Sang-mi; South Korea | 46.523 |
| 1000 m | Yang Yang (A); China | 1:40.363 | Yang Yang (S); China | 1:40.683 | Joo Min-jin; South Korea | 1:40.742 |
| 1500 m | Yang Yang (A); China | 2:32.707 | Park Hye-won; South Korea | 2:32.829 | Joo Min-jin; South Korea | 2:33.175 |
| 3000 m | An Sang-mi; South Korea | 5:24.272 | Yang Yang (A); China | 5:27.445 | Annie Perreault; Canada | 5:30.222 |
| 3000 m relay | China | 4:28.267 | South Korea | 4:28.388 | Canada | 4:35.417 |

* First place is awarded 34 points, second is awarded 21 points, third is awarded 13 points, fourth is awarded 8 points, fifth is awarded 5 points, sixth is awarded 3 points, seventh is awarded 2 points, and eighth is awarded 1 point in the finals of each individual race to determine the overall world champion. The relays do not count for the overall classification.

== Medal table ==
| Rank | Nation | Gold | Silver | Bronze | Total |
|---|---|---|---|---|---|
| 1 | China (CHN) | 6 | 5 | 2 | 13 |
| 2 | South Korea (KOR) | 4 | 3 | 3 | 10 |
| 3 | Canada (CAN) | 1 | 2 | 2 | 5 |
| 4 | Bulgaria (BUL) | 1 | 0 | 0 | 1 |
| 5 | Japan (JPN) | 0 | 1 | 2 | 3 |
| 5 | United States (USA) | 0 | 1 | 2 | 3 |
| 7 | Italy (ITA) | 0 | 0 | 1 | 1 |
| Totals (7 entries) | | 12 | 12 | 12 | 36 |
