= Julie Goskowicz Koons =

American short track speed skater

Personal information
- Born: March 2, 1980 (age 46) New Berlin, Wisconsin, U.S.

Sport
- Country: United States
- Sport: Short track speed skating
- Event: 3000 m relay

Achievements and titles
- Olympic finals: 1998 Nagano, Japan; 2002 Salt Lake City, Utah

Julie Goskowicz Koons (born March 2, 1980) is a retired American short track speed skater and a two-time Winter Olympian. She competed as part of the United States speed skating team in the 3000 meter relay in both the 1998 Winter Olympics in Nagano and the 2002 Winter Olympics in Salt Lake City. Julie's brother is also a former U.S. Olympian.
