= Rusty Smith (speed skater) =

Short track speed skater

Personal information
- Born: August 27, 1979 (age 46) Sunset Beach, California, U.S.

Sport
- Sport: Short track speed skating
Medal record
Men's short track speed skating
Representing the United States
Olympic Games
Bronze medal – third place	2002 Salt Lake City	500m
Bronze medal – third place	2006 Turin	5000m relay
World Championships
Gold medal – first place	2001 Jeonju	5000 m relay
Bronze medal – third place	2002 Montréal	1500 m
Bronze medal – third place	2006 Minneapolis	5000 m relay
World Junior Championships
Silver medal – second place	1997 Marquette	Overall
Silver medal – second place	1997 Marquette	1500 m
Bronze medal – third place	1997 Marquette	1000 m
Bronze medal – third place	1997 Marquette	1500 m S.F
Goodwill Games
Bronze medal – third place	2000	500 m

Rusty Smith (born August 27, 1979) is a short track speed skater from the United States who won bronze in the 500m at the 2002 Winter Olympics in Salt Lake City and another bronze in the 5000m relay at the 2006 Winter Olympics in Turin.

== Olympic qualification race controversy ==
In December 2001, Shani Davis traveled to Utah to race for a spot on the 2002 Winter Olympics short track team. Teammates Smith and Apolo Ohno already had slots on the six-man team due to points earned from earlier races, and Ron Biondo was a lock for the third spot. In order for Davis to qualify, he would have to actually win the final race. As both Ohno and Smith were also participating, Davis would have to beat them both. Since Ohno had been dominant in the meet to this point, winning every race he entered with ease, a win by Davis seemed to be a long shot. However, the 1,000m race would end with Ohno coming in third, Smith second and Davis at the top of the podium.

However, the victory was short-lived, as rumors began to swirl that Ohno and Smith, both good friends of Davis', intentionally threw the race so that Davis would win. After returning to Colorado Springs, O'Hare would file a formal complaint. For three days, Ohno, Smith and Davis stood before an arbitration panel as three of their fellow skaters testified that they heard Ohno telling Smith that he was going to let Davis win.

Ohno would later confess that he subconsciously held back for fear of suddenly crashing into Davis or Smith, a common occurrence in the sport, pointing out that he did not need to win the race because he already had a spot on the team. Question persisted that if Ohno had really held back, why did he keep passing Ron Biondo? Some speculated that Ohno was holding off Biondo from challenging Smith, as Smith also needed to finish ahead of Biondo in order to secure a spot in the 1000m for Salt Lake. Even this scenario would have been a violation of the rules of team skating. Both claims went unproven in the arbitration case, and all three were absolved of guilt.

On February 13, 2002 Sports Illustrated writer Brian Cazeneuve published an article stating that, after reviewing the race, "To this day, there is no concrete proof that any skaters violated the spirit of competition." Cazeneuve would, however, also publish the comments of Outside Life Network commentator Todd Harris and 1998 Winter Olympian speed skater Eric Flaim, which were made during the broadcast of the race; both men agreed that Ohno and Smith had not skated at 100%.
