= Éric Bédard =

Canadian short-track speed skater

Personal information
- Born: December 17, 1976 (age 49) Sainte-Thècle, Quebec, Canada

Sport
- Sport: Short track speed skating
Medal record
Men's short track speed skating
Representing Canada
Olympic Games
Gold medal – first place	1998 Nagano	5000 m relay
Gold medal – first place	2002 Salt Lake City	5000 m relay
Silver medal – second place	2006 Turin	5000 m relay
Bronze medal – third place	1998 Nagano	1000 m
World Championships
Gold medal – first place	1998 Vienna	5000 m relay
Gold medal – first place	2000 Sheffield	500 m
Silver medal – second place	2000 Sheffield	Overall
Silver medal – second place	2000 Sheffield	1500 m
Silver medal – second place	2001 Jeonju	5000 m relay
Silver medal – second place	2002 Montréal	5000 m relay
Silver medal – second place	2003 Warsaw	5000 m relay
Silver medal – second place	1998 Vienna	500 m
Bronze medal – third place	1999 Sofia	5000 m relay
Bronze medal – third place	2002 Montréal	1000 m
World Team Championships
Gold medal – first place	1998 Bormio	Team
Gold medal – first place	2000 The Hague	Team
Gold medal – first place	2001 Nobeyama	Team
Gold medal – first place	2003 Sofia	Team
Gold medal – first place	2005 Chuncheon	Team
Silver medal – second place	1999 St. Louis	Team
Silver medal – second place	2002 Milwaukee	Team

Éric Bédard (born December 17, 1976, in Sainte-Thècle, Quebec) is a Canadian short track speed skater who has won four Olympic medals (2 gold, 1 silver, 1 bronze).

== Career ==
He participated in three individual events at the 2006 Winter Olympics and finished fourth in the 500 meters. He also led a team into the 5000 meter relay, winning the silver medal. He has been a longtime member of Canada's short track team and has won four medals in three Olympic games: bronze in the 1,000 meters in Nagano, and two golds and a silver in the 5,000 meter relay. He has also had a lot of success at the World Championships, capturing 10 medals, including three golds (5,000 m relay in 2005 and 1998 and 500 m in 2000).

Bédard was national squad coach of Germany from 2008 until 2010. From 2010 until 2014 he coached the Italy national team. From 2018 to 2020 Bédard coached the Canadian national team. Since 2020, Bédard has worked for Nagano Skate.

== See also ==
- Canadian short track speed skating all-time medals list
