= Min Ryoung =

South Korean speed skater

Medal record

Men's short track speed skating

Representing South Korea

World Championships
| Gold medal – first place | 2000 Sheffield | Overall |

World Junior Championships
| Gold medal – first place | 2000 Szekesfehervar | Overall |
| Bronze medal – third place | 2001 Warsaw | Overall |

Min Ryoung (Korean: 민룡; Hanja: 閔龍; RR: Min Ryong; born July 14, 1982, in Daegu) is a retired South Korean short track speed skater. He is the 2000 Overall World Champion.

== 2002 Winter Olympics ==
Min participated in the 2002 Winter Olympics held in Salt Lake City, Utah. Prior to the Olympics, he was expected to compete in the 1500 metre or 1000 metre individual events along with the 5000 metre relay. However, the South Korean coach controversially announced that he would send Min to only the relay event in order to give the opportunities of the individual competitions to another prospect Ahn Hyun-Soo.

On February 13, The South Korean relay team raced with United States, Italy, and Australia in the 45-lap semifinal race. During the 17th lap, Min attempted to pass United States team member Rusty Smith on the inside. But Min made a bad pass and bumped Smith's elbow and shoulder with his hip. Min collided with the Italian Nicola Rodigari, and the two fell on the ice and spun out into the boards. Min was sent to a hospital emergency room for evaluation for back and hip injuries. But the Korean team was disqualified.

Due to the injury, Min retired from short track speed skating for good next year.
