= Jonathan Guilmette =

Short track speed skater

Personal information
- Born: August 18, 1978 (age 48) Montreal, Quebec, Canada
- Height: 180 cm (5 ft 11 in)
- Weight: 70 kg (154 lb)
Medal record
Men's short track speed skating
Representing Canada
Olympic Games
Gold medal – first place	2002 Salt Lake City	5000m relay
Silver medal – second place	2002 Salt Lake City	500 m
Silver medal – second place	2006 Turin	5000m relay
World Championships
Gold medal – first place	2006 Minneapolis	5000 m relay
Silver medal – second place	2001 Jeonju	500 m
Silver medal – second place	2001 Jeonju	5000 m relay
Silver medal – second place	2002 Montréal	1500 m
Silver medal – second place	2002 Montréal	5000 m relay
Silver medal – second place	2003 Warsaw	5000 m relay
Silver medal – second place	2004 Gothenburg	1500 m
Bronze medal – third place	2001 Jeonju	3000 m
World Team Championships
Gold medal – first place	2000 The Hague	Team
Gold medal – first place	2001 Nobeyama	Team
Gold medal – first place	2003 Sofia	Team
Silver medal – second place	1999 St. Louis	Team
Silver medal – second place	2002 Milwaukee	Team
Silver medal – second place	2004 St. Petersburg	Team
Silver medal – second place	2006 Montréal	Team
World Junior Championships
Silver medal – second place	1995 Calgary	Overall
Silver medal – second place	1995 Calgary	1500 m
Gold medal – first place	1995 Calgary	1500 m S.F.

Jonathan Guilmette (born August 18, 1978 in Montreal, Quebec) is a Canadian short track speed skater who won silver in the 5000m relay at the 2006 Winter Olympics in Turin. At the 2002 Winter Olympics in Salt Lake, he won Gold in the 5000m relay and silver in the 500m.

Guilmette currently works at the Olympic Oval in Calgary, Alberta, Canada.
