= Amélie Goulet-Nadon =

Short track speed skater

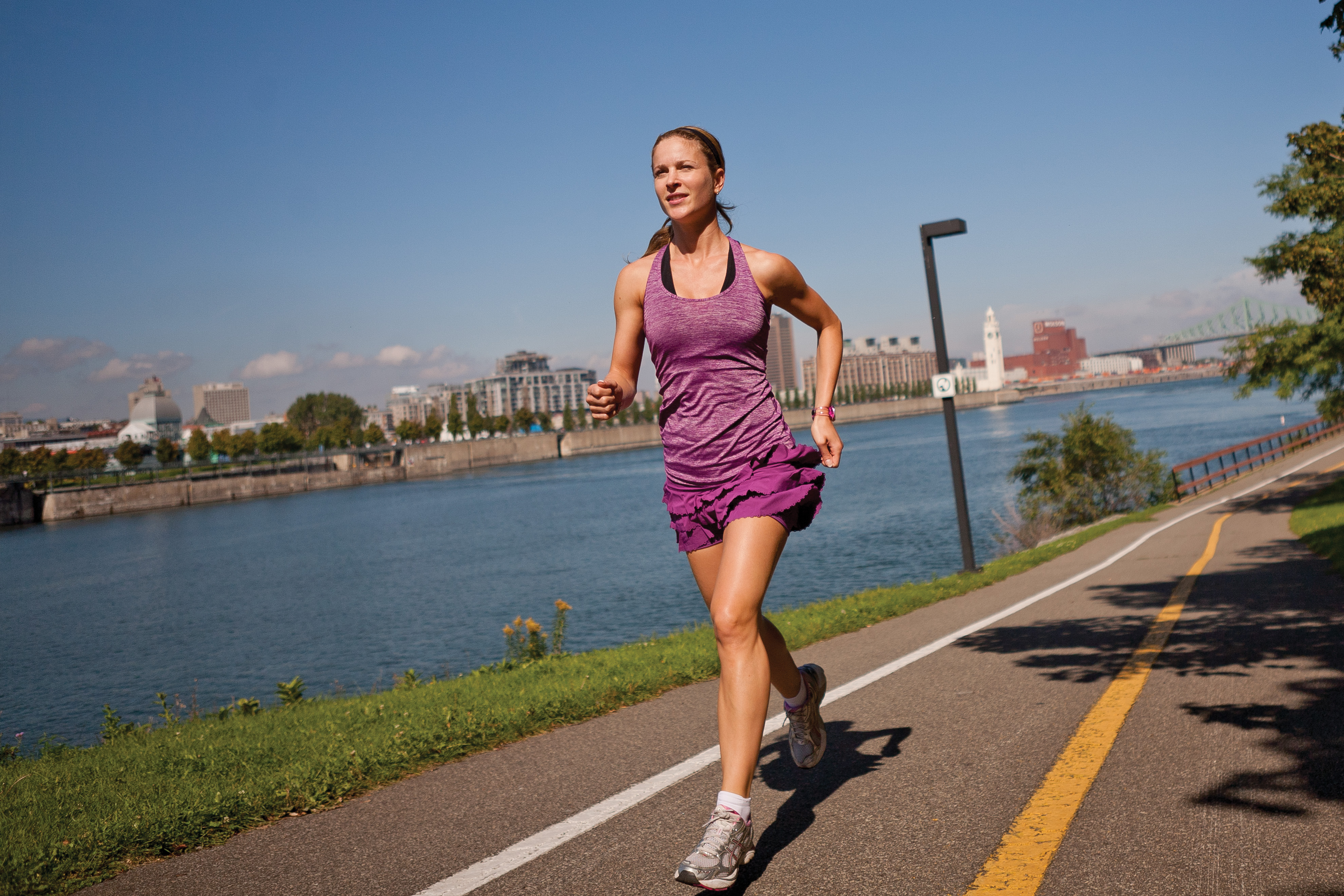

Medal record

Women's short track speed skating

Representing Canada

Olympic Games
Bronze medal – third place	2002 Salt Lake City	3000 m relay

World Championships
Silver medal – second place	2003 Warsaw	500 m
Silver medal – second place	2003 Warsaw	3000 m Relay

Amélie Goulet-Nadon (born January 24, 1983, in Laval, Quebec) is a Canadian short track speed skater who competed in the 2002 Winter Olympics.

In 2002, she was a member of the Canadian relay team which won the bronze medal in the 3000 metre relay competition. Goulet-Nadon was considered one of Canada's rising superstars in short track until a problem arose with her motor problem, forcing her to abandon the 2006 Turin Olympics and eventually retire early at the age of 23. Her accomplishments include winning the overall 500m, 1000, and 1500m world cups in 2002-03 and finishing second overall in the season. As of 2009, Goulet-Nadon is a graduate in naturopathy who would like to help people incorporate sports and healthy living into their lifestyles. Goulet-Nadon resides in Montreal, Quebec.
