= Choi Eun-kyung =

South Korean speed skater (born 1984)

Personal information
- Born: December 26, 1984 (age 41) Daegu, South Korea
- Height: 1.65 m (5 ft 5 in)
- Weight: 62 kg (137 lb; 9.8 st)

Sport
- Country: South Korea
- Sport: Short track speed skating
Medal record
Women's short track speed skating
Representing South Korea
Event	1st	2nd	3rd
Olympic Games	2	2	0
World Championships	9	3	3
World Team Championships	5	1	0
Olympic Games
Gold medal – first place	2002 Salt Lake City	3000 m relay
Gold medal – first place	2006 Turin	3000 m relay
Silver medal – second place	2002 Salt Lake City	1500 m
Silver medal – second place	2006 Turin	1500 m
World Championships
Gold medal – first place	2002 Montréal	3000 m
Gold medal – first place	2002 Montréal	3000 m relay
Gold medal – first place	2003 Warsaw	1500 m
Gold medal – first place	2003 Warsaw	Overall
Gold medal – first place	2004 Gothenburg	1500 m
Gold medal – first place	2004 Gothenburg	1000 m
Gold medal – first place	2004 Gothenburg	Overall
Gold medal – first place	2004 Gothenburg	3000 m relay
Gold medal – first place	2005 Beijing	1000 m
Silver medal – second place	2003 Warsaw	1000 m
Silver medal – second place	2003 Warsaw	3000 m
Silver medal – second place	2005 Beijing	Overall
Bronze medal – third place	2004 Gothenburg	500 m
Bronze medal – third place	2005 Beijing	3000 m
Bronze medal – third place	2006 Minneapolis	1500 m
World Team Championships
Gold medal – first place	2002 Milwaukee	Team
Gold medal – first place	2003 Sofia	Team
Gold medal – first place	2004 St. Petersburg	Team
Gold medal – first place	2005 Chuncheon	Team
Gold medal – first place	2006 Montréal	Team
Silver medal – second place	2001 Nobeyama	Team
Winter Universiade
Gold medal – first place	2005 Innsbruck	500 m
Gold medal – first place	2005 Innsbruck	1000 m
Gold medal – first place	2005 Innsbruck	1500 m
Gold medal – first place	2005 Innsbruck	3000 m
Gold medal – first place	2005 Innsbruck	3000 m relay

- Choi Eun-kyung
- Hangul: 최은경
- Hanja: 崔恩景
- RR: Choe Eungyeong
- MR: Ch'oe Ŭn'gyŏng

Choi Eun-kyung (Korean: 최은경; Hanja: 崔恩景, born December 26, 1984) is a South Korean short track speed skater. She is a double Olympic Champion in relays and a two-time Overall World Champion for 2003 and 2004.

== Biography ==
At the 2002 Winter Olympics, Choi won a silver medal in the 1500 m and was a member of the gold medal-winning relay team in the 3000 m relay. She was the world recordholder for 1500 m at the time.

Choi's career heights came between the 2002 and 2006 Winter Olympics. She was the Overall World Champion in 2003 and in 2004. She also won the Overall World Cup title for the 2003–2004 season.

At the 2006 Winter Olympics, Choi equalled her achievements from the previous Olympics, winning a silver medal in the 1500 m and winning gold in the 3000 m relay. She was disqualified in the finals of the 1000 m.

== Personal records ==
Personal records
Women's short track speed skating
Event	Result	Date	Location	Notes
500 m	44.496	2003-10-24	(United States) Marquette, Michigan	
1000 m	1:31.052	2005-11-13	(Italy) Bormio, Lombardy	
1500 m	2:20.978	2005-03-11	(China) Beijing	

== See also ==
- South Korea women's national short track team
