= 2001 World Short Track Speed Skating Championships =

The 2001 World Short Track Speed Skating Championships took place between March 29 and 31, 2001 in Jeonju, South Korea. The World Championships are organised by the ISU which also runs world cups and championships in speed skating and figure skating.

== Results ==
=== Men ===
Event	Gold		Silver		Bronze	
Overall*	Li Jiajun; China	68 points	Apolo Anton Ohno; United States	63 points (1st in 3000m)	Marc Gagnon; Canada	63 points (2nd in 3000m)
500 m	Li Jiajun; China	43.433	Jonathan Guilmette; Canada	43.465	Maurizio Carnino; Italy	44.691
1000 m	Li Jiajun; China	1:32.034	Apolo Anton Ohno; United States	1:32.160	Min Ryoung; South Korea	1:32.269
1500 m^{†}	Marc Gagnon; Canada	2:20.325	Min Ryoung; South Korea; Satoru Terao; Japan	2:20.677	N/A	
3000 m	Apolo Anton Ohno; United States	5:36.664	Marc Gagnon; Canada	5:36.831	Jonathan Guilmette; Canada	5:37.322
5000 m relay	United States	7:15.885	Canada	7:16.458	China	7:25.312

^{†} In the final of the Men's 1500 m, Min Ryoung and Terao Satoru crossed the finish line at the same time, thus both were awarded silver medals.

* First place is awarded 34 points, second is awarded 21 points, third is awarded 13 points, fourth is awarded 8 points, fifth is awarded 5 points, sixth is awarded 3 points, seventh is awarded 2 points, and eighth is awarded 1 point in the finals of each individual race to determine the overall world champion. The relays do not count for the overall classification.

=== Women ===
Event	Gold		Silver		Bronze	
Overall*	Yang Yang (A); China	123 points	Wang Chunlu; China	81 points	Evgenia Radanova; Bulgaria	50 points
500 m	Wang Chunlu; China	45.779	Yang Yang (A); China	45.872	Yang Yang (S); China	45.949
1000 m	Yang Yang (A); China	1:45.664	Wang Chunlu; China	1:45.734	Yang Yang (S); China	1:45.773
1500 m	Yang Yang (A); China	2:40.448	Evgenia Radanova; Bulgaria	2:40.625	Marie-Ève Drolet; Canada	2:40.643
3000 m	Yang Yang (A); China	5:43.454	Wang Chunlu; China	5:43.549	Evgenia Radanova; Bulgaria	5:43.650
3000 m relay	China	4:25.927	South Korea	4:25.976	Bulgaria	4:27.597

* First place is awarded 34 points, second is awarded 21 points, third is awarded 13 points, fourth is awarded 8 points, fifth is awarded 5 points, sixth is awarded 3 points, seventh is awarded 2 points, and eighth is awarded 1 point in the finals of each individual race to determine the overall world champion. The relays do not count for the overall classification.

== Medal table ==
Rank	Nation	Gold	Silver	Bronze	Total
1	China (CHN)	9	4	3	16
2	United States (USA)	2	2	0	4
3	Canada (CAN)	1	3	3	7
4	South Korea (KOR)	0	2	1	3
5	Bulgaria (BUL)	0	1	3	4
6	Japan (JPN)	0	1	0	1
7	Italy (ITA)	0	0	1	1
Totals (7 entries)		12	13	11	36
