= 2002 World Short Track Speed Skating Championships =

The 2002 World Short Track Speed Skating Championships took place between April 5 and 7, 2002 in Montreal, Quebec, Canada. The World Championships are organised by the ISU which also run world cups and championships in speed skating and figure skating.

== Results ==
=== Men ===
| Event | Gold | | Silver | | Bronze | |
|---|---|---|---|---|---|---|
| Overall* | Kim Dong-sung; South Korea | 136 points | Ahn Hyun-soo; South Korea | 42 points | Fabio Carta; Italy | 34 points |
| 500 m | Kim Dong-sung; South Korea | 41.930 | Fabio Carta; Italy | 42.044 | Ron Biondo; USA | 42.195 |
| 1000 m | Kim Dong-sung; South Korea | 1:31.361 | Ahn Hyun-soo; South Korea | 1:31.435 | Éric Bédard; Canada | 1:31.632 |
| 1500 m | Kim Dong-sung; South Korea | 2:21.736 | Jonathan Guilmette; Canada | 2:31.595 | Rusty Smith; USA | 2:31.706 |
| 3000 m | Kim Dong-sung; South Korea | 5:19.041 | Ahn Hyun-soo; South Korea | 5:19.170 | Fabio Carta; Italy | 5:20.145 |
| 5000 m relay | South Korea | 7:10.751 | Canada | 7:10.756 | China | 7:11.330 |

* First place is awarded 34 points, second is awarded 21 points, third is awarded 13 points, fourth is awarded 8 points, fifth is awarded 5 points, sixth is awarded 3 points, seventh is awarded 2 points, and eighth is awarded 1 point in the finals of each individual race to determine the overall world champion. The relays do not count for the overall classification.

=== Women ===
| Event | Gold | | Silver | | Bronze | |
|---|---|---|---|---|---|---|
| Overall* | Yang Yang (A); China | 105 points | Ko Gi-hyun; South Korea | 63 points | Evgenia Radanova; Bulgaria | 55 points |
| 500 m | Yang Yang (A); China | 44.460 | Evgenia Radanova; Bulgaria | 44.586 | Wang Chunlu; China | 44.676 |
| 1000 m | Yang Yang (A); China | 1:34.732 | Ko Gi-hyun; South Korea | 1:34.734 | Evgenia Radanova; Bulgaria | 1:35.185 |
| 1500 m | Yang Yang (A); China | 2:31.630 | Ko Gi-hyun; South Korea | 2:31.666 | Amélie Goulet-Nadon; Canada | 2:32.234 |
| 3000 m | Choi Eun-kyung; South Korea | 5:17.678 | Evgenia Radanova; Bulgaria | 5:22.718 | Ko Gi-hyun; South Korea | 5:34.285 |
| 3000 m relay | South Korea | 4:18.599 | China | 4:19.516 | Canada | 4:19.587 |

* First place is awarded 34 points, second is awarded 21 points, third is awarded 13 points, fourth is awarded 8 points, fifth is awarded 5 points, sixth is awarded 3 points, seventh is awarded 2 points, and eighth is awarded 1 point in the finals of each individual race to determine the overall world champion. The relays do not count for the overall classification.

== Medal table ==
| Rank | Nation | Gold | Silver | Bronze | Total |
|---|---|---|---|---|---|
| 1 | South Korea (KOR) | 8 | 6 | 1 | 15 |
| 2 | China (CHN) | 4 | 1 | 2 | 7 |
| 3 | Canada (CAN) | 0 | 2 | 3 | 5 |
| 4 | Bulgaria (BUL) | 0 | 2 | 2 | 4 |
| 5 | Italy (ITA) | 0 | 1 | 2 | 3 |
| 6 | United States (USA) | 0 | 0 | 2 | 2 |
| Totals (6 entries) | | 12 | 12 | 12 | 36 |
