= Wang Chunlu =

Short track speed skater

Medal record
Event	1st	2nd	3rd
Olympic Games	0	2	1
World Championships	10	8	1
World Team Championships	4	3	0

Women's short track speed skating

Olympic Games
Silver medal – second place	1998 Nagano	3000 m relay
Silver medal – second place	2002 Salt Lake City	3000 m relay
Bronze medal – third place	2002 Salt Lake City	500 m

World Championships
Gold medal – first place	1995 Gjøvik	500 m
Gold medal – first place	1995 Gjøvik	1000 m
Gold medal – first place	1995 Gjøvik	3000 m relay
Gold medal – first place	1998 Vienna	500 m
Gold medal – first place	1998 Vienna	3000 m relay
Gold medal – first place	1999 Sofia	3000 m relay
Gold medal – first place	2000 Sheffield	3000 m relay
Gold medal – first place	2001 Jeonju	500 m
Gold medal – first place	2001 Jeonju	3000 m relay
Gold medal – first place	2003 Warsaw	3000 m relay
Silver medal – second place	1995 Gjøvik	Overall
Silver medal – second place	1996 The Hague	3000 m relay
Silver medal – second place	1998 Vienna	Overall
Silver medal – second place	1998 Vienna	1500 m
Silver medal – second place	2001 Jeonju	Overall
Silver medal – second place	2001 Jeonju	1000 m
Silver medal – second place	2001 Jeonju	3000 m
Silver medal – second place	2002 Montréal	3000 m relay
Bronze medal – third place	1995 Gjovik	1500 m
Bronze medal – third place	2002 Montréal	500 m

World Team Championships
Gold medal – first place	1998 Bormio	Team
Gold medal – first place	1999 St. Louis	Team
Gold medal – first place	2000 The Hague	Team
Gold medal – first place	2001 Nobeyama	Team
Silver medal – second place	1995 Zoetermeer	Team
Silver medal – second place	2002 Milwaukee	Team
Silver medal – second place	2003 Sofia	Team

Asian Winter Games
Gold medal – first place	1996 Harbin	500 m
Gold medal – first place	1996 Harbin	3000 m relay

Wang Chunlu (Chinese: 王春露; pinyin: Wáng Chūnlù, born 27 September 1978 in Changchun, China) is a Chinese short track speed skater. She won medals in the 500 m and 3000 m relay at the 2002 Winter Olympics. She had also already won a relay silver medal at the 1998 Winter Olympics, at the age of 19.

Her strongest event by far was always the 500 metres, where she won 3 world titles- 1995, 1998, and 2001. In addition to her Olympic bronze in 2002, she was also leading the final and on her way to a likely gold medal in 1998 before a dangerous and poorly executed passing attempt by Isabelle Charest unfortunately led to Charest and Wang both falling. Distraught Wang, despite not being injured, refused to complete her 5 laps, and ceded the bronze medal to Chun Lee Kyung, the winner of the B final. Her strong start and strength on high speed corners are what made the 500 metres Wang's strongest event.

Surprisingly her best major meet performance was at the 1995 World Championships at only 16, where as a relative newcomer she won gold in the 500 meters and 1000 metres, and a bronze in the 1500 metres. Despite this she was narrowly defeated for the Overall points title by Chun Lee Kyung, taking silver overall. She also won silver overall at the 2001 World Championships, and a bronze overall at the 1998 World Championships. She competed in what is perhaps still to this day the strongest era ever in Chinese short track speed skating from 94-2002 due to its depth of established stars such as Wang, both Yang Yang's (the one born in 1976 and the one born in 1977), Zhang Yanmei, and Li Yan.
