= Li Haonan (speed skater) =

Chinese speed skater (born 1981)

Personal information
- Nationality: Chinese
- Born: 1 August 1981 (age 45) Changchun, China

Sport
- Sport: Short track speed skating

Li Haonan (born 1 August 1981) is a Chinese short track speed skater. He competed in two events at the 2006 Winter Olympics and achieved 5th Place in the 5,000 metres Relay.
