= Mathieu Turcotte =

Canadian short-track speed skater

Medal record

Men's short track speed skating

Representing Canada

Olympic Games
Gold medal – first place	2002 Salt Lake City	5000 m relay
Silver medal – second place	2006 Turin	5000 m relay
Bronze medal – third place	2002 Salt Lake City	1000 m

World Championships
Gold medal – first place	1998 Bormio	Team
Gold medal – first place	2000 The Hague	Team
Gold medal – first place	2001 Nobeyama	Team
Gold medal – first place	2003 Sofia	Team
Gold medal – first place	2005 Chuncheon	Team
Gold medal – first place	2005 Beijing	5000 m relay
Gold medal – first place	2006 Minneapolis	5000 m relay
Silver medal – second place	2001 Jeonju	5000 m relay
Silver medal – second place	2002 Montréal	5000 m relay
Silver medal – second place	2002 Milwaukee	Team
Silver medal – second place	2003 Warsaw	5000 m relay
Silver medal – second place	2004 St. Petersburg	Team
Silver medal – second place	2006 Montréal	Team

Mathieu Turcotte (born February 8, 1977) is a Canadian former short track speed skater. He was born in Sherbrooke, Quebec.

Turcotte rose to fame within Canada upon winning the bronze in the men's 1000 m in the short track speed skating at the 2002 Winter Olympics, with a time of 1:30.563 (a race more remembered for the victory of Australian Steven Bradbury), and winning a gold as part of the men's 5000 m relay at the same games, with a team time of 6:51.579.

He placed 6th at the men's 1500 m short track speed skating at the 2006 Winter Olympics with a time of 2:24.558.

Mathieu is now the President of Apex Racing Skates, a company that makes custom short track speed skates.
