= Fu Tianyu =

Chinese speed skater (born 1978)

Personal information
- Nationality: Chinese
- Born: 16 July 1978 (age 46); Heilongjiang, China

Sport
- Sport: Short track speed skating

Fu Tianyu (Chinese: 付天于; pinyin: Fù Tianyú;born 16 July 1978) is a Chinese short track speed skater. She competed in two events at the 2006 Winter Olympics.
