= Korea Skating Union =

Sports governing body in South Korea

- Sport: Figure skating, speed skating, short-track speed skating
- Jurisdiction: South Korea
- Abbreviation: KSU
- Founded: 1945
- Affiliation: International Skating Union
- Affiliation date: 1947
- Headquarters: Olympic Park, Songpa District, Seoul
- President: Yoon Hong-geun

Official website
- skating.or.kr
- (South Korea)

The Korea Skating Union (Korean: 대한빙상경기연맹; RR: Daehan Bingsang Gyeonggi Yeonmaeng) is the national governing body for the sports of figure skating, speed skating and short-track speed skating in South Korea, recognised by the International Skating Union and the Korean Sport & Olympic Committee.

== History ==
Ice skating was introduced to Korea at the end of the 19th century. Early competitions were held in the 1920s on the Taedong River and Han River. The Joseon Skating Union(조선빙상경기연맹) was established under the leadership of Choi Do-yong on November 24, 1945. In April 1946, it was divided into separate organisations for figure skating and speed skating, before merging again in 1947. It joined the International Skating Union the same year. In September 1948, it was renamed the Korea Skating Union (대한빙상경기연맹), in line with changing naming practices at the time.

In 2014, the South Korean government launched an audit into the Korea Skating Union over allegations of corruption and factionalism. Vice president Jun Myung-kyu resigned due to accusations of preferential treatment and encouraging factional conflict. The Korean Sport & Olympic Committee (KSOC) abolished the union's executive committee in 2016 in an effort to avoid factional feuds. In 2018, the Korea Skating Union was again audited by the Ministry of Culture, Sports and Tourism following a series of corruption scandals, resulting in the dismissal of its executives. Jun Myung-kyu resigned yet again, having been reinstated in 2017, after it was found that he had maintained "undue influence" at the union through the operation of an unofficial executive board, in violation of KSOC's 2016 order. The audit found further evidence of wrongdoings, including inappropriate hiring practices and selection of national team athletes, and suspicious processes in choosing sponsors. It was designated as an organisation needing "special care" and came under the management of KSOC. It returned to self-government in November 2020.

== Presidents ==
List of presidents
Name	Term
Lee Il	1945–1950
Choi Jae-eun	1950–1954
Park Young-jin	1954–1958
Lee Seong-deok	1958–1959
Park Jin-seok	1959–1962
Um Jeom-deuk	1962–1963
Park Young-jin	1963–1964
Jang Hyeop	1964–1966
Jang Gi-seop	1966–1968
Lee Jin-yong	1968–1970
Lee Byeong-hee	1970–1971
Jo Dong-ha	1971–1973
Jang Gi-seop	1973–1975
Park Dong-seon	1975–1978
Hwang Chung-hwa	1978–1980
Lee Su-yeong	1980–1993
Chang Myung-hee	1993–1995
Na Seung-ryeol	1995–1997
Park Seong-in	1997–2011
Kim Jae-yeol	2011–2016
Kim Sang-hang	2016–2018
Yoon Hong-geun	2020–present

== Controversies ==
=== Factional strife and abuse ===
Since 1992 to 2022, South Korea won a total of 79 Winter Olympic medals. Out of these, 75 were obtained in ice skating events managed by the Korea Skating Union. The Short track speed skating event alone accounted for a total of 53 medals, with 26 being golds.

However, the Korea Skating Union and short track speed skating have been a stage of controversies since the 1990s. In 1994, Chang Myung-hee, the union president at the time, was accused from athletes and skating professionals for the alleged financial bribery and corruption involving coaches and high-ranking officials of the union. And all these controversies and allegations of assault never ceased. Since then saw officials and national team coaches being investigated by the police for match-fixing, bribery, embezzlement, breach of trust, assault, and sexual assault.

The elite sports system in Korea was characterized by a hierarchical power structure between coaches and athletes, and amongst athlete ranks, surpassing the traditional teacher-student relationship. Athletes who defied, confronted or disobeyed the coaches instructions faced retaliation. Moreover, Incidents of physical and sexual assault were covered up, ignored, and silenced. In January 2019, when the Korea skating union was all over the news by a sexual assault scandal, some athletes who testified to the South Korean media stated that, "Even with guaranteed anonymity, the risk is too high." and "Even a famous athlete like Ahn Hyun-soo had his whole career change after speaking out. The moment I speak up, my career as an athlete could be over."

Within this situation, athletes were divided among coaches, universities, and semi-professional teams, leading to competition and eventually forming factions within the union.

Victims of assaults even included renowned Olympic medalists and world champions. In 2005, Ahn Hyun-soo and Sung Si-bak were assaulted by senior athletes during an international competition. Moreover, two vice-presidents of the Korea Skating Union were investigated for receiving money from the parents of the athlete who was excluded from the national team due to assault. According to statements from six female athletes in November 2004, including Choi Eun-kyung, Yeo Soo-yeon, Byun Chun-sa, Heo Hee-bin, Kang Yun-mi, and Jin Sun-yu, they experienced severe physical abuse, with hair being pulled out and being beaten with hockey sticks by coaches. But these incidents were soon forgotten. The perpetrators of assault were appointed again as national team coaches in subsequent Olympics. The 2004 assault case involving the women's team remained under the surface for a decade until it was brought back to attention in 2014, in connection with Viktor Ahn's naturalization. It caught more attention in 2018 following the assault case by Shim Suk-hee and an interview with Byun Chun-sa, who first reported the assault, on JTBC Newsroom.

In December 2018, Byun Chun-sa testified about the situation at the time, stating the following. "It was even worse than what was reported in the media at the time, in reality. The coaches told us that, 'If you say anything about being assaulted, we will ruin you to the very end, no matter where you go' But we exposed the truth because we felt like we might actually die. After that, my life as an athlete was extremely difficult. Even after retiring, working in the same sports industry was challenging. Even 14 years later, the memories are still vivid. We are all living with a lot of phsycological pain."

==== KNSU and non-KNSU ====
The internal conflicts of Korean short track skating were publicly exposed in 2006. Right until before the Olympics, Ahn Hyun-soo trained with the women's team, while Jin Sun-yu and Byun Chun-sa trained with the men's team.

Ahn Hyun-soo, who was from Korea National Sport University (KNSU), exposed the aiding and abetting assault by the national team coach in 2005 and, after conflicts with the Skating Union, he ended up training with the women's team. Jin Sun-yu, who was not from Korea National Sport University, had her race interfered with on the instructions from the coach. The coach of the national team had ordered her teammates to sabotage Jin Sun-yu's race and prevent her from winning because she had gone against the coach's directives. This incident was exposed through Byun Chun-sa's testimony. The men's national team's athletes and coaching staff were not from Korea National Sport University, while the women's national team's athletes and coaches were from Korea National Sport University. There were two distinct teams within one national representative team: one from Korea National Sport University and the other not.

At Incheon International Airport, Ahn Hyun-soo's father assaulted the vice-president of the Korea Skating Union, after the World Championships. He claimed that coaches and athletes conspired to prevent Ahn Hyun-soo from winning the overall championship. The airport incident and the collision between athletes during the 3000m race at the World Championships were broadcast live in news footage. This led to the Korea Skating Union's Investigation Committee decidung on disciplinary actions for the athletes, but after video reviews and athletes' testimonies, it was concluded that there was no malice in the collisions involving Ahn Hyun-soo, Lee Ho-suk, and Oh Se-jong. However, the media and the Investigation Committee pointed out that the deepening factional issues were due to the leaders trying to showcase their power in the selection process of national athletes and team leaders.

After the 2010 Vancouver Winter Olympics, the Korean short track was embroiled in scandals such as match-fixing and internal factions. Deals for rights of Olympic and World Championship participation took place among athletes and coaches of the same faction. However, this soon caused divisions between the athletes leading to subsequent exposures. The word of these incidents spread among the athletes’ parents and was exposed by Ahn Hyun-soo's father. Ahn Hyun-Soo's father has decided to reveal the match-fixing of the national team trial for the 2010 Winter Olympic Games in Vancouver due to the following reasons.

A family of Lee Jung-Su noticed that Lee lost his opportunity to participate individual event for the World Championship. The family of Lee has informed this event to theother parents of the athletes, and they have decided to report the Korea Skating Union to Korean Sports Council Investigation Committee for thorough investigation. They started a petition for the investigation and more than 200 people agreed to join the petition, yet more than 300 people's engagement was needed in order to file the case to the committee. In this sense, they requested the father of Ahn who is influential to the public to post this scandal on his son’ s Fan Club Page and finally this scandal has been completely revealed to Korean society and the public. This shook the Korean society and sports community. Lee Jung-su revealed that he had not injured his ankle, but the coaches went on to force him to write a statement claiming he could not participate due to his injury. After the Vancouver Olympics, a blame game ensued between the participating athletes and coaches. Although the disciplinary actions for Lee Jung-su and Kwak Yoon-gy were reduced from three years to six months, all coaches, including Kim Ki-hoon and Chun Jae-mok, faced penalties. However, Lee Jung-su who received a penalty, protested that the coercion had turned into collusion.

Ahn Ki-won, Ahn Hyun-soo's father, pointed out the Korea Skating Union's leadership, including the then-resigned vice president Yoo Tae-wook and Jun Myung-kyu, for exerting undue pressure on coaches and athletes.

The aftermath of the 2010 match-fixing incident revolved around Ahn Hyun-soo regardless of his intentions, consequently leading to his naturalization. The scheduled national team selection was moved to accommodate Ahn Hyun-soo's military training, and the selection method changed, leading to controversy. In 2010, the Korean media JoongAng Ilbo and The Chosun Ilbo reported that the Vancouver Olympic qualifier were held when Ahn Hyun-soo, who had won three gold medals at the Torino Olympics, and Jin Sun-yu, were injured, aiming to exclude them. Another South Korean media, MBN reported that Ahn Hyun-soo was excluded from the Olympic qualifiers for not following the faction leader's orders.

In 2010, the Seongnam City Hall Skating Team, which was Ahn Hyun-soo's semi-pro team, was disbanded, and no team wanted him. Together with these controversies, Ahn Hyun-soo changed his nationality to Russia in 2011. After that in the 2014 Winter Olympics, he won three gold medals and one bronze medal, just like in 2006. The South Korean men's team failed to win Olympic medals, and the Korean media and public criticized the Korea Skating Union. Especially, Jun Myung-kyu, the vice president of the Korea Skating Union, who was known to have issues with Ahn Hyun-soo after he graduated from the Korea National Sport University and chose a semi-pro team, became the target of criticism. In March 2014, the day Viktor Ahn won his sixth World Championship overall title, Jun Myung-kyu resigned from his vice-presidential position.

==== Ice godfather ====
The person frequently mentioned at the center of the Korea Skating Union controversies was Jun Myung-kyu, a professor at the Korea National Sport University and former vice president of the Korea Skating Union. He resigned as vice president of the Korea Skating Union after the 2010 Vancouver Olympics match-fixing scandal but soon returned. He resigned again in March 2014 and returned as vice president in 2017 ahead of the Pyeongchang Olympics. But in April 2018, after an expose on SBS's TV program "I Want to Know" about the alleged neglect of former athlete Noh Jin-kyu's osteosarcoma leading to his death, Jun Myung-kyu resigned from his vice-presidential position and decided not to hold any more positions in the Korea Skating Union. Jun Myung-kyu was credited for discovering and coaching Olympic gold medalists and world champions, including Kim Ki-hoon, Kim So-hee, Chun Lee-kyung, Kim Dong-sung, Ahn Hyun-soo, Mo Tae-bum, Lee Sang-hwa, and Lee Seung-hoon. With his disciples winning hundreds of medals on the international stage, he was regarded as the godfather of Korean ice skating.

Jun Myung-kyu and his supporters argued that his disciples achieved great results, and forces that envy him conspired with political powers to defame him. Regarding Ahn Hyun-soo's naturalization controversy, they claimed that Ahn Hyun-soo and Jun Myung-kyu had a good relationship, and further claimed that Ahn Hyun-soo himself stated that he did not change his nationality due to factional issues or problems with Vice President Jun Myung-kyu. Also claiming to the degree that other factions seeking authority in skating used his naturalization for their benefits. Indeed, Viktor Ahn repeatedly denied issues of factionalism, discord with Vice President Jun Myung-kyu, and penalties from the Korea Skating Union during the three Olympic periods from 2014 to 2022.

However, critics against Jun Myung-kyu argued that he exacerbated factional conflicts in the skating community. They claimed that he controlled the Korean National Sport University's ice rink to his will and that the university's influence was already a central power cartel. They accused him of wrongly being involved in the selection of national representatives, college admissions, coaching appointments for national and semi-pro teams, and player admissions to semi-pro teams. Most crucially, he was accused of covering up violence and sexual violence in Korean skating sports.

In 2014, it was revealed that in 2012 a disciple of professor Jun, who was a national coach, attempted to sexually assault a female disciple. The reward for covering up the sexual crime was admission to a semi-pro team. Since 2010, when Ahn Hyun-soo could not find a team after the dissolution of the Sungnam regional team, it was alleged that senior officials of the Korea Skating Union exerted pressure through semi-pro teams, which was linked to players' salaries and career. In 2014, there were accusations of sexual harassment by a coach of the Hwaseong regional team, who had the authority regarding selection and renewal of contracts for the female athletes. The coach faced legal consequences in 2015, but Hwaseong City Hall fired the athletes together with the coaches. The Korea Skating Union permanently banned the coach, but his penalty was later reduced to three years.

Shim Suk-hee exposed the assault by her national team coach in 2018, who had been training her since childhood, and revealed sexual assaults by the coach in 2019. According to Shim Suk-hee's court testimony, she stated, "I was regularly beaten and verbally abused since elementary school. I broke a finger after being hit with a hockey stick. Just before the Olympics, I was beaten so severely that I thought I might die."

The chief director and coaching staff of the 2018 Olympic national team, who led the Korean team to victory, were suspended for their attempts at covering up the incident. It was also confirmed that the Korean Sports Association and Vice President Jun Myung-kyu, tried to cover up his disciple coach's assault and sexual assault. The Korean National Sport University was investigated by the government for abuse of power, embezzlement, and breach of trust. All this led to Jun Myung-kyu's position as a professor at the Korean National Sport University to be dismissed in 2019.

However, during the investigation of the Korea Skating Union and Professor Jun Myung-kyu in February 2018, Viktor Ahn stated that his naturalization was not due to pressure Jun Myung-kyu. And in August 2019, Shim Suk-hee, who was the victim of the case, opposed the dismissal of Professor Jun and submitted a petition. Viktor Ahn and Shim Suk-hee, known to have been subjected to assault and pressure between 2018 and 2019, made these statements defending Professor Jun, leading to a confusing situation.

In 2018–2019, the "Young Ice Skaters' Solidarity" was the first group of ice skaters to accuse Professor Jun Myung-kyu and the Korea Skating Union during the #MeToo movement. On January 21, 2019, the group held a press conference at the Yeouido National Assembly to call for an intense government audit of the Korea National Sports University and the Korea Skating Union. Later that day, Professor Jun Myung-kyu held a press conference at the Olympic Park Hotel in Songpa District, Seoul, to deny allegations of sexual assault cover-ups against him. Professor Jun claimed that the group, which calls him the enemy of the ice-skating community, is a faction with political connections. He also claimed that the Young Ice Skaters' Alliance lured Coach Cho Jae-beom into writing a false statement. In this regard, the young ice skaters' solidarity group emphasized that factionalism has disappeared from the ice skating community, and emphasized the one-man dictatorship of the former professor and the human rights of athletes and the #MeToo movement.

However, in August 2020, a coach assaulted athletes at the Tancheon Ice rink in Seongnam, which was the center of the young ice skaters' solidarity. and it was revealed that the ice coaches and athletes who did not cooperate with them were called "enemies" and wielded power, and some of the coaches who participated in the young ice skaters' solidarity also had a history of assaulting athletes. The athletes and coaches of the Young Ice Skaters Solidarity have since split. In December 2020, Park Ji-hoon, a lawyer who led the charge against Professor Jun Myung-kyu in January 2019 as a spokesperson for the Young Ice Skaters Solidarity, criticized them, saying "They talked about human rights but only used them. They were just pursuing a power struggle in the name of human rights."

From 2020 to 2023, Jun Myung-kyu won most of the lawsuits against the state and the Korean National Sport University over three years. And he returned to his professorship at the Korean National Sport University in 2023. but Although it was later revealed that there was a misdiagnosis at the hospital, he lost the appeal against the verdict that he had pressured and prevented the treatment of No Jin-kyu, who had osteosarcoma, leading to the player's death, as alleged by the families and relatives of No Jin-kyu.

==== South Korean political scandal ====
Between 2016 and 2017, the Korea Skating Union was also mentioned in the national political scandal, known as the "Choi Soon-sil Gate." At that time, Choi Soon-sil's nephew, Jang Si-ho, was criticized for embezzling hundreds of millions of taxes for the construction of a winter center. Because of this, famous speed skating athlete and coach Lee Kyou-hyuk attended a National Assembly hearing and was investigated. Other notable figures in the ice skating community, including Olympic gold medalists and famous commentators, were also mentioned. Ironically, some of them had criticized Jun Myung-kyu. Allegations included political collusion in coaching appointments, embezzlement of public funds, and covering up past sexual scandal.

In relation to this, in February 2018, Congressman Ahn Min-seok, who was investigating the Korea Skating Union, describing it like a clash of the old and new evils, mentioned that former Skating Union President Chang Myung-hee's and Vice President Jun Myung-kyu's faction had been engaged in a power struggle for decades.

In 2021, Korea's National Human Rights Commission pointed out that the main perpetrators of abuse and human rights violations faced by the athletes in the ice skating, were their coaches. The National Human Rights Commission pointed out that "the human rights of ice skaters are particularly serious in the field of sports, where the human rights situation is generally weak. In particular, 75% of semi-professional teams ice skaters were victims of violence, more than double the rate of other sports. Athletes were regularly assaulted "once or twice a month," and 25 percent said they were assaulted "almost every day. And, another sexual violence incident happened. In 2022, former national representative figure skating coach Lee Kyu-hyun was sentenced to four years in prison for attempted rape of a female athlete. During his first trial, the prosecution stated that, "The defendant's family is a famous skating family in Korea, and due to this, the normal life for the victim has become impossible."

== Medal table ==
=== Winter Olympics ===
event	Gold	Silver	Bronze	GoldSilverBronze
Short-track at the Olympic Games	26	16	11	53
Speed skating at the Olympic Games	5	10	5	20
Figure skating at the Olympic Games	1	1		2
total	32	27	16	75

=== World Championship ===
event	Gold medal	Silver medal	Bronze medal	
World Short Track Speed Skating Championships	115	83	71	269
World Short Track Speed Skating Team Championships	20	15	5	40
World Sprint Speed Skating Championships	7	3	4	14
World Single Distances Speed Skating Championships	10	11	7	28
World Figure Skating Championships	2	4	2	8
total	154	116	89	359

== Detailed results ==
=== Winter Olympics ===
==== Short-track speed skating ====
The results from the 1988 demonstration competition are not included in the official Olympic statistics.

Year	1st place, gold medalist(s)	2nd place, silver medalist(s)	3rd place, bronze medalist(s)	total
1988	2			2

Year	1st place, gold medalist(s)	2nd place, silver medalist(s)	3rd place, bronze medalist(s)	total
1992	2		1	3
1994	4		1	5
1998	3	1	2	6
2002	2	2		4
2006	6	3	1	10
2010	2	4	2	8
2014	2	1	2	5
2018	3	1	2	6
2022	2	3		5
total	26	16	11	53

==== Speed skating ====
Year	1st place, gold medalist(s)	2nd place, silver medalist(s)	3rd place, bronze medalist(s)	total
1992		1		1
2006			1	1
2010	3	2		5
2014	1	1		2
2018	1	4	2	7
2022		2	2	4
total	5	10	5	20

==== Figure skating ====
Year	1st place, gold medalist(s)	2nd place, silver medalist(s)	3rd place, bronze medalist(s)	total
2010	1			1
2014		1		1
total	1	1		2
