= South Korea at the 2006 Winter Olympics =

- IOC code: KOR
- NOC: Korean Olympic Committee
- Website: www.sports.or.kr (in Korean and English)

in Turin
- Competitors: 40 in 9 sports
- Flag bearers: Lee Bo-ra (opening); Jeon Da-hye (closing)
- Medals Ranked 7th: Gold 6 Silver 3 Bronze 2 Total 11

Winter Olympics appearances (overview)
- 1948; 1952; 1956; 1960; 1964; 1968; 1972; 1976; 1980; 1984; 1988; 1992; 1994; 1998; 2002; 2006; 2010; 2014; 2018; 2022; 2026

Other related appearances
- Korea (2018)

Athletes from South Korea marched with athletes from North Korea in the opening ceremonies under the Korean Unification Flag.

South Korea competed as Republic of Korea at the 2006 Winter Olympics, while North Korea competed as the Democratic People's Republic of Korea. At the opening ceremony, the athletes of both North and South Korea entered the stadium together behind the Korean Unification Flag.

== Medalists ==
- In terms of medal count, South Korea is the only Asian country in the top ten.
- Ten of the eleven medals were won in short track speed skating. Short track speedskaters Jin Sun-yu and Ahn Hyun-soo were the second and third people to win three gold medals each in Turin. Ahn also won a bronze.

Medal	Name	Sport	Event
Gold	Ahn Hyun-soo	Short track speed skating	Men's 1000 m
Gold	Ahn Hyun-soo	Short track speed skating	Men's 1500 m
Gold	Ahn Hyun-soo; Lee Ho-suk; Oh Se-jong; Seo Ho-jin; Song Suk-woo	Short track speed skating	Men's 5000 m relay
Gold	Jin Sun-yu	Short track speed skating	Women's 1000 m
Gold	Jin Sun-yu	Short track speed skating	Women's 1500 m
Gold	Byun Chun-sa; Choi Eun-kyung; Jeon Da-hye; Jin Sun-yu; Kang Yun-mi	Short track speed skating	Women's 3000 m relay
Silver	Lee Ho-suk	Short track speed skating	Men's 1000 m
Silver	Lee Ho-suk	Short track speed skating	Men's 1500 m
Silver	Choi Eun-kyung	Short track speed skating	Women's 1500 m
Bronze	Ahn Hyun-soo	Short track speed skating	Men's 500 m
Bronze	Lee Kang-seok	Speed skating	Men's 500 m

== Alpine skiing ==
Athlete	Event	Final				
Athlete	Event	Run 1	Run 2	Run 3	Total	Rank
Gang Min-hyeok	Men's giant slalom	did not finish				
Gang Min-hyeok	Men's slalom	58.53	disqualified			
Kim Hyeong-cheol	Men's giant slalom	1:26.09	1:26.37	n/a	2:52.46	28
Kim Woo-sung	Men's giant slalom	did not finish				
O Jae-eun	Women's giant slalom	1:08.22	1:16.25	n/a	2:24.47	33
O Jae-eun	Women's slalom	48.07	53.77	n/a	1:41.84	41

== Biathlon ==
Athlete	Event	Final		
Athlete	Event	Time	Misses	Rank
Park Yun-bae	Men's sprint	31:29.5	3	80
Park Yun-bae	Men's individual	1:07:03.4	6	81

== Cross-country skiing ==
Distance

Athlete	Event	Final	
Athlete	Event	Total	Rank
Choi Im-heon	Men's 15 km classical	46:21.7	78
Choi Im-heon	Men's 30 km pursuit	did not finish	
Jeong Ui-myeong	Men's 15 km classical	46:40.8	80
Jeong Ui-myeong	Men's 30 km pursuit	did not finish	
Jeong Ui-myeong	Men's 50 km freestyle	did not finish	
Lee Chae-won	Women's 10 km classical	32:57.8	62
Lee Chae-won	Women's 15 km pursuit	49:01.2	57
Lee Chae-won	Women's 30 km freestyle	did not finish	
Park Byeong-ju	Men's 15 km classical	46:38.9	79
Park Byeong-ju	Men's 30 km pursuit	did not finish	

Sprint

Athlete	Event	Qualifying		Quarterfinal		Semifinal		Final	
Athlete	Event	Total	Rank	Total	Rank	Total	Rank	Total	Rank
Jeong Ui-myeong	Men's sprint	2:35.39	76	Did not advance					76
Lee Chae-won	Women's sprint	2:35.47	64	Did not advance					64
Park Byeong-ju	Men's sprint	2:28.85	63	Did not advance					63
Choi Im-heon; Park Byeong-ju	Men's team sprint	n/a				19:40.0	10	Did not advance	19

== Freestyle skiing ==
Athlete	Event	Qualifying		Final	
Athlete	Event	Points	Rank	Points	Rank
Yun Chae-rin	Women's moguls	7.07	30	did not advance	30

== Luge ==
Athlete	Event	Final					
Athlete	Event	Run 1	Run 2	Run 3	Run 4	Total	Rank
Kim Min-kyu	Men's singles	53.748	54.961	53.528	53.344	3:35.581	29

== Short track speed skating ==
Men

Athlete	Event	Heats		Quarterfinals		Semifinals		Final	
Athlete	Event	Time	Rank	Time	Rank	Time	Rank	Time	Rank
Ahn Hyun-soo	500 m	42.960	1 Q	42.213	1 Q	41.826	1 Q	42.089	Bronze
Ahn Hyun-soo	1000 m	1:27.372	1 Q	1:29.671	1 Q	1:27.909	1 Q	1:26.739 OR	Gold
Ahn Hyun-soo	1500 m	2:29.808	1 Q	n/a		2:17.718	1 Q	2:25.341	Gold
Lee Ho-suk	500 m	42.676	1 Q	1:22.896	4	did not advance			
Lee Ho-suk	1000 m	1:35.634	1 Q	1:27.265	1 Q	1:29.150	1 Q	1:26.764	Silver
Lee Ho-suk	1500 m	2:31.511	1	n/a		2:20.901	2	2:25.600	Silver
Seo Ho-jin	500 m	disqualified							
Ahn Hyun-soo; Lee Ho-suk; Seo Ho-jin; Oh Se-jong; Song Suk-woo	5000 m relay	n/a				7:01.783	2	6:43.376 OR	Gold

Women

Athlete	Event	Heats		Quarterfinals		Semifinals		Final	
Athlete	Event	Time	Rank	Time	Rank	Time	Rank	Time	Rank
Jin Sun-yu	500 m	45.954	1 Q	46.428	3	did not advance			
Jin Sun-yu	1000 m	1:31.504	1 Q	1:33.351	1 Q	1:32.546	1 Q	1:32.859	Gold
Jin Sun-yu	1500 m	2:29.731	1 Q	n/a		2:31.747	1 Q	2:23.494	Gold
Kang Yun-mi	500 m	45.755	2 Q	Disqualified					
Choi Eun-kyung	1000 m	1:38.414	1 Q	1:32.875	1 Q	1:32.099	1 Q	Disqualified	
Choi Eun-kyung	1500 m	2:37.862	2 Q	n/a		2:22.776	1 Q	2:24.069	Silver
Byun Chun-sa	1500 m	2:41.411	2 Q	n/a		2:26.915	1 Q	Disqualified	
Jin Sun-yu; Choi Eun-kyung; Byun Chun-sa; Kang Yun-mi; Jeon Da-hye	3000 m relay	n/a				4:18.854	1st	4:17.040	Gold

== Skeleton ==
Athlete	Event	Final			
Athlete	Event	Run 1	Run 2	Total	Rank
Kang Kwang-bae	Men's	1:00.41	59.88	2:00.29	23

== Ski jumping ==
Athlete	Event	Qualifying		First Round		Final		
Athlete	Event	Points	Rank	Points	Rank	Points	Total	Rank
Choi Heung-chul	Normal hill	104.0	36	did not advance				36
Choi Heung-chul	Large hill	85.4	23 Q	65.3	47	did not advance		47
Choi Yong-jik	Normal hill	104.0	36	did not advance				36
Choi Yong-jik	Large hill	22.8	53	did not advance				53
Kang Chil-ku	Normal hill	96.5	44	did not advance				44
Kang Chil-ku	Large hill	58.8	45	did not advance				45
Kim Hyun-ki	Normal hill	107.5	30 Q	104.5	43	did not advance		43
Kim Hyun-ki	Large hill	75.3	32 Q	84.4	39	did not advance		39
Choi Heung-chul; Choi Yong-jik; Kang Chil-ku; Kim Hyun-ki	Team	n/a		321.15	13	did not advance		13

== Speed skating ==
Men

Athlete	Event	Race 1		Final	
Athlete	Event	Time	Rank	Time	Rank
Choi Jae-bong	500 m	35.61	35.43	1:11.04	8
Choi Jae-bong	1000 m	n/a		1:10.23	17
Kwon Sun-chun	500 m	58.66	36.13	1:34.79	37
Lee Jin-woo	1500 m	n/a		1:49.85	28
Lee Jong-woo	1500 m	n/a		1:48.11	14
Lee Kang-seok	500 m	35.34	35.09	1:10.43	Bronze medal
Lee Kang-seok	1000 m	n/a		1:10.52	22
Lee Kyou-hyuk	500 m	35.76	35.62	1:11.38	17
Lee Kyou-hyuk	1000 m	n/a		1:09.37	4
Mun Jun	1000 m	n/a		1:10.66	24
Mun Jun	1500 m	n/a		1:48.38	16
Yeo Sang-yeop	5000 m	n/a		6:58.13	28

Women

Athlete	Event	Race 1		Final	
Athlete	Event	Time	Rank	Time	Rank
Choi Seung-yong	500 m	39.65	39.37	1:19.02	18
Kim Yoo-rim	500 m	39.57	39.68	1:19.25	20
Kim Yoo-rim	1000 m	n/a		1:18.77	28
Lee Bo-ra	500 m	40.01	39.72	1:19.73	25
Lee Bo-ra	1000 m	n/a		1:21.19	34
Lee Ju-yeon	1000 m	n/a		1:18.66	26
Lee Ju-yeon	1500 m	n/a		2:00.85	16
Lee Sang-hwa	500 m	38.35	38.69	1:17.04	5
Lee Sang-hwa	1000 m	n/a		1:17.78	19
Noh Seon-yeong	1500 m	n/a		2:03.35	32
Noh Seon-yeong	3000 m	n/a		4:15.68	19
