= Team Korea =

Brand of South Korea

- Current owner: Korean Sport & Olympic Committee
- Website: http://www.sports.or.kr/

Team Korea is the brand name used since 2010 by the Korean Sport & Olympic Committee (KOC) and Korean Paralympic Committee for their Korean Olympic team.

== National teams ==
=== Olympic & Asian Games teams ===
- Badminton
  - Korea national badminton team
- Basketball
  - Korea national basketball team
  - Korea women's national basketball team
- Boxing
  - Korea national amateur boxing athletes
- Field hockey
  - Korea national field hockey team
  - Korea women's national field hockey team
- Football
  - South Korea national under-23 football team
  - South Korea women's national football team
- Handball
  - South Korea men's national handball team
  - South Korea women's national handball team
- Ice hockey
  - South Korea men's national ice hockey team
  - South Korea men's national junior ice hockey team
  - South Korea women's national ice hockey team
- Short track
  - South Korea national short track team
  - South Korea women's national short track team
- Tennis
  - South Korea Davis Cup team
  - South Korea Fed Cup team
- Volleyball
  - South Korea men's national volleyball team
  - South Korea women's national volleyball team
- Water polo
  - South Korea men's national water polo team

=== Other international competitions ===
- A1 GP
  - A1 Team Korea
- American football
  - Korea national American football team
- Baseball
  - South Korea national baseball team
  - South Korea women's national baseball team
- Beach soccer
  - South Korea national beach soccer team
- Cricket
  - South Korea national cricket team
- Football
  - South Korea national football team
  - South Korea national under-20 football team
  - South Korea national under-17 football team
  - South Korea women's national under-20 football team
  - South Korea women's national under-17 football team
- Futsal
  - South Korea national futsal team
  - South Korea women's national futsal team
- Korfball
  - South Korea national korfball team
- Rugby
  - South Korea national rugby union team
  - South Korea national rugby sevens team
  - South Korea women's national rugby union team (sevens)
- Sailing
  - A team representing the Sail Korea Yacht Club in the America's Cup

== See also ==
- Team GB
