= 2005–06 ISU Short Track Speed Skating World Cup =

ISU Short Track World Cup
- Dates: 30 September 2005 – 20 November 2005

The 2005–06 ISU Short Track Speed Skating World Cup was a multi-race tournament for short track speed skating over a season. The season began on 30 September 2005 and ended on 20 November 2005. The World Cup was organised by the International Skating Union which also ran world cups and championships in speed skating and figure skating.

The World Cup consisted of four tournaments this season, rather than six, due to the 2006 Winter Olympics.

== Calendar ==
=== Men ===
==== China ====
Date	Place	Distance	Winner	Second	Third
30 September 2005	(China) Hangzhou	1500m	(United States) Apolo Anton Ohno	(South Korea) Ahn Hyun-soo	(China) Li Ye
1 October 2005	(China) Hangzhou	500m	(China) Li Jiajun	(South Korea) Ahn Hyun-soo	(United States) François-Louis Tremblay
2 October 2005	(China) Hangzhou	1000m	(South Korea) Ahn Hyun-soo	(China) Li Jiajun	(South Korea) Lee Ho-suk
2 October 2005	(China) Hangzhou	3000m	(South Korea) Lee Ho-suk	(South Korea) Ahn Hyun-soo	(China) Li Jiajun
2 October 2005	(China) Hangzhou	5000m relay	South Korea	China	Canada

==== Korea ====
Date	Place	Distance	Winner	Second	Third
7 October 2005	(South Korea) Seoul	1500m	(South Korea) Ahn Hyun-soo	(Canada) Mathieu Turcotte	(South Korea) Lee Ho-suk
8 October 2005	(South Korea) Seoul	500m	(China) Li Haonan	(Canada) Éric Bédard	(South Korea) Song Suk-Woo
9 October 2005	(South Korea) Seoul	1000m	(United States) Apolo Anton Ohno	(China) Li Jiajun	(South Korea) Ahn Hyun-soo
9 October 2005	(South Korea) Seoul	3000m	(United States) Apolo Anton Ohno	(South Korea) Ahn Hyun-soo	(South Korea) Lee Ho-suk
9 October 2005	(South Korea) Seoul	5000m relay	South Korea	China	Canada

==== Italy ====
Date	Place	Distance	Winner	Second	Third
11 November 2005	(Italy) Bormio	1500m	(United States) Apolo Anton Ohno	(South Korea) Lee Ho-suk	(Canada) Charles Hamelin
12 November 2005	(Italy) Bormio	500m	(South Korea) Ahn Hyun-soo	(Canada) Éric Bédard	(United States) Apolo Anton Ohno
13 November 2005	(Italy) Bormio	1000m	(South Korea) Lee Ho-suk	(South Korea) Song Suk-woo	(China) Li Ye
13 November 2005	(Italy) Bormio	3000m	(United States) Apolo Anton Ohno	(South Korea) Lee Ho-suk	(South Korea) Ahn Hyun-soo
13 November 2005	(Italy) Bormio	5000m relay	South Korea	China	United States

==== Netherlands ====
Date	Place	Distance	Winner	Second	Third
18 November 2005	(Netherlands) The Hague	1500m	(South Korea) Ahn Hyun-soo	(South Korea) Lee Ho-suk	(China) Li Jiajun
19 November 2005	(Netherlands) The Hague	500m	(South Korea) Ahn Hyun-soo	(China) Li Jiajun	(United States) JP Kepka
20 November 2005	(Netherlands) The Hague	1000m	(China) Li Jiajun	(United States) JP Kepka	(South Korea) Ahn Hyun-soo
20 November 2005	(Netherlands) The Hague	3000m	(South Korea) Lee Ho-suk	(China) Li Ye	(United States) Apolo Anton Ohno
20 November 2005	(Netherlands) The Hague	5000m relay	United States	(South Korea) Korea	China

=== Women ===
==== China ====
Date	Place	Distance	Winner	Second	Third
30 September 2005	(China) Hangzhou	1500m	(China) Wang Meng	(South Korea) Jin Sun-yu	(South Korea) Byun Chun-sa
1 October 2005	(China) Hangzhou	500m	(China) Wang Meng	(China) Fu Tianyu	(Bulgaria) Evgenia Radanova
2 October 2005	(China) Hangzhou	1000m	(China) Wang Meng	(China) Yang Yang (A)	(South Korea) Jin Sun-yu
2 October 2005	(China) Hangzhou	3000m	(China) Yang Yang (A)	(Bulgaria) Evgenia Radanova	(Russia) Nina Evteeva
2 October 2005	(China) Hangzhou	3000m relay	China	South Korea	Canada

==== Korea ====
Date	Place	Distance	Winner	Second	Third
7 October 2005	(South Korea) Seoul	1500m	(China) Yang Yang (A)	(Italy) Evgenia Radanova	(South Korea) Jin Sun-yu
8 October 2005	(South Korea) Seoul	500m	(China) Wang Meng	(China) Fu Tianyu	(Canada) Kalyna Roberge
9 October 2005	(South Korea) Seoul	1000m	(China) Wang Meng	(South Korea) Byun Chun-sa	(Italy) Evgenia Radanova
9 October 2005	(South Korea) Seoul	3000m	(South Korea) Byun Chun-sa	(Russia) Tatyana Borodulina	
9 October 2005	(South Korea) Seoul	3000m relay	China	South Korea	Canada

==== Italy ====
Date	Place	Distance	Winner	Second	Third
11 November 2005	(Italy) Bormio	1500m	(South Korea) Jin Sun-yu	(South Korea) Choi Eun-kyung	(China) Yang Yang (A)
12 November 2005	(Italy) Bormio	500m	(China) Wang Meng	(Italy) Evgenia Radanova	(Canada) Kalyna Roberge
13 November 2005	(Italy) Bormio	1000m	(South Korea) Jin Sun-yu	(China) Yang Yang (A)	(Russia) Tatyana Borodulina
13 November 2005	(Italy) Bormio	3000m	(South Korea) Jin Sun-yu	(China) Wang Meng	(South Korea) Byun Chun-sa
13 November 2005	(Italy) Bormio	3000m relay	(South Korea) Korea	Canada	Italy

==== Netherlands ====
Date	Place	Distance	Winner	Second	Third
18 November 2005	(Netherlands) The Hague	1500m	(South Korea) Jin Sun-yu	(China) Wang Meng	(South Korea) Byun Chun-sa
19 November 2005	(Netherlands) The Hague	500m	(China) Wang Meng	(Italy) Evgenia Radanova	(Canada) Kalyna Roberge
20 November 2005	(Netherlands) The Hague	1000m	(China) Yang Yang (A)	(China) Wang Meng	(South Korea) Byun Chun-sa
20 November 2005	(Netherlands) The Hague	3000m	(South Korea) Jin Sun-yu	(South Korea) Choi Eun-kyung	(United States) Allison Baver
20 November 2005	(Netherlands) The Hague	3000m relay	Canada	Germany	South Korea

== Overall standings ==
=== Men ===
Distance	Winner	Second	Third
500m	(South Korea) Ahn Hyun-soo	(China) Li Jiajun	(Canada) Éric Bédard
1000m	(South Korea) Lee Ho-suk	(South Korea) Ahn Hyun-soo	(United States) Apolo Anton Ohno
1500m	(South Korea) Ahn Hyun-soo	(South Korea) Lee Ho-suk	(United States) Apolo Anton Ohno
5000m relay	South Korea	China	United States
Overall	(South Korea) Ahn Hyun-soo	(South Korea) Lee Ho-suk	(United States) Apolo Anton Ohno

=== Women ===
Distance	Winner	Second	Third
500m	(China) Wang Meng	(Italy) Evgenia Radanova	(China) Fu Tianyu
1000m	(China) Wang Meng	(South Korea) Byun Chun-sa	(Italy) Evgenia Radanova
1500m	(South Korea) Jin Sun-yu	(China) Yang Yang (A)	(South Korea) Byun Chun-sa
3000m relay	South Korea	Canada	China
Overall	(South Korea) Jin Sun-yu	(Italy) Evgenia Radanova	(United States) Allison Baver

== See also ==
- Short track speed skating at the 2006 Winter Olympics
- 2006 World Short Track Speed Skating Championships
- 2006 World Short Track Speed Skating Team Championships
- 2006 European Short Track Speed Skating Championships
