= South Korea national short track team =

The South Korea national short track team represents South Korea in international short track speed skating team relay competitions like the World Championships and the Winter Olympics. The team's colors are blue and black.

== Olympic record (5000 m relay) ==
Olympics	Medal	Skaters	Time
Albertville 1992	(gold) Gold	Kim Ki-Hoon / Lee Joon-Ho / Mo Ji-Soo / Song Jae-Kun	7:14.020
Nagano 1998	(silver) Silver	Chae Ji-Hoon / Lee Jun-Hwan / Lee Ho-Eung / Kim Dong-Sung	7:06.776
Turin 2006	(gold) Gold	Lee Ho-Suk / Ahn Hyun-Soo / Seo Ho-Jin / Song Suk-Woo / Oh Se-Jong	6:43.376
Vancouver 2010	(silver) Silver	Kim Seoung-Il / Kwak Yoon-Gy / Lee Ho-Suk / Lee Jung-Su / Sung Si-Bak	6:44.446

== Famous players ==
- Kim Dong-Sung
- Lee Ho-Suk
- Ahn Hyun-Soo
- Lee Jung-Su
- Sung Si-Bak
- Shim Suk-hee

== See also ==
- South Korea women's national short track team
