= Jeon Da-hye =

South Korean short track speed skater (born 1983)

Personal information
- Born: November 23, 1983 (age 42) Pohang, South Korea
- Height: 170 cm (5 ft 7 in)
- Weight: 63 kg (139 lb)
Medal record
Women's short track speed skating
Representing South Korea
Olympic Games
Gold medal – first place	2006 Turin	3000 m relay
World Championships
Silver medal – second place	2001 Jeonju	3000 m relay
World Team Championships
Gold medal – first place	2005 Chuncheon	Team
Gold medal – first place	2006 Montreal	Team
Silver medal – second place	2000 The Hague	Team
Silver medal – second place	2001 Minamimaki	Team
Winter Universiade
Gold medal – first place	2003 Tarvisio	3000 m relay
Gold medal – first place	2005 Innsbruck	3000 m relay
Bronze medal – third place	2003 Tarvisio	500 m

Jeon Da-hye (Korean: 전다혜; Hanja: 全多慧; born November 23, 1983) is a South Korean short track speed skater who won gold in the women's 3000 metre relay at the 2006 Winter Olympics.

She was born in Pohang, North Gyeongsang Province, South Korea. In 1999 Jeon earned her first call to the South Korea women's national short track team at the age of 16. In 2001, she won two silver medals at the World Championships as a member of the national team.

In 2001 Jeon was omitted from the national team roster and did not participated in the 2002 Winter Olympics. In February 2002, however, Jeon gained attention again, winning five gold medals at the national collegiate championships.

Jeon first participated at the Winter Olympics in February 2006. She was expected to compete in the 500 metres as well but competed only in the 3000 metre relay due to injuries, combining with Choi Eun-Kyung, Byun Chun-Sa, Jin Sun-Yu and Kang Yun-Mi. Team Korea eventually won its fourth consecutive Olympic women's 3000 metre relay gold medal.

Jeon was selected as the reserve member of the South Korean national team for the 2010 Winter Olympics, ranked sixth overall in the national Olympic trials. However, she did not get a chance to participate in any event at the Olympics. In February 2011, Jeon won the gold medal in the women's senior 500 metres at the 2011 Korean National Sports Festival by .37 of a second to beat out 2006 Olympic gold medalist Kang Yun-Mi.
