= South Korea women's national short track team =

The South Korea women's national short track team represents South Korea in international short track speed skating team relay competitions including the World Championships and the Winter Olympics.

== 3000 metre relay Olympic record ==
| Olympics | Medal | Skaters | Time |
|---|---|---|---|
| Lillehammer 1994 | (gold) Gold | Chun Lee-kyung / Kim Ryang-hee / Kim So-hee / Kim Yoon-mi / Won Hye-kyung | 4:26.640 |
| Nagano 1998 | (gold) Gold | Chun Lee-kyung / Won Hye-kyung / An Sang-mi / Kim Yoon-mi | 4:16.260 |
| Salt Lake City 2002 | (gold) Gold | Choi Min-kyung / Joo Min-jin / Park Hye-won / Choi Eun-kyung | 4:12.793 |
| Turin 2006 | (gold) Gold | Choi Eun-kyung / Jeon Da-hye / Jin Sun-yu / Byun Chun-sa / Kang Yun-mi | 4:17.040 |
| Vancouver 2010 | — | Cho Ha-ri / Kim Min-jung / Lee Eun-byul / Park Seung-hi | DSQ |
| Sochi 2014 | (gold) Gold | Shim Suk-hee / Park Seung-hi / Kong Sang-jeong / Cho Ha-ri / Kim A-lang | 4:09.498 |

== See also ==
- South Korea national short track team
