= 2005 World Short Track Speed Skating Team Championships =

Short track team championship

- Location: Chuncheon, South Korea
- Start date: 5 March 2005
- End date: 6 March 2005

The 2005 World Short Track Speed Skating Team Championships was the 15th edition of the World Short Track Speed Skating Team Championships, which took place on 5-6 March 2005 in Chuncheon, South Korea.

Teams were divided into two brackets of four: the best team from each bracket qualified directly for the final, while the two next teams entered for the repechage round and the last was eliminated. The best two teams in the repechage round qualified for the final. Thus, the final consisted of four teams. Each team was represented by four athletes at both 500 m and 1000 m as well as by two athletes at 3000 m. There were four heats at both 500 m and 1000 m, whereby each heat consisted of athletes representing different countries. There was one heat at 3000 m.

== Medal winners ==
Event	Gold	Silver	Bronze
Men	Canada; François-Louis Tremblay; Mathieu Turcotte; Steve Robillard; Éric Bédard; Charles Hamelin	South Korea; Ahn Hyun-soo; Lee Seung-hoon; Song Kyung-taek; Seo Ho-jin; Lee Jae-kyung	China; Li Ye; Li Jiajun; Li Haonan; Sui Baoku; Cui Liang
Women	South Korea; Choi Eun-kyung; Jin Sun-yu; Kang Yun-mi; Yeo Soo-yeon; Jeon Da-hye	China; Wang Meng; Yang Yang (A); Cheng Xiaolei; Zhu Mi Lei; Fu Tianyu	Canada; Alanna Kraus; Anouk Leblanc-Boucher; Kalyna Roberge; Tania Vicent; Amanda Overland

== Results ==
=== Men ===
Rank	Nation	Total
1st place, gold medalist(s)	Canada	43
2nd place, silver medalist(s)	South Korea	36
3rd place, bronze medalist(s)	China	22
4	Japan	17
5	Italy	Rep.
6	United Kingdom	Rep.
7	Russia	DNQ
8	France	DNQ

=== Women ===
Rank	Nation	Total
1st place, gold medalist(s)	South Korea	43
2nd place, silver medalist(s)	China	35
3rd place, bronze medalist(s)	Canada	24
4	Japan	17
5	Italy	Rep.
6	Russia	Rep.
7	France	DNQ
