= Alex Izykowski =

American short track speed skater

Alex Izykowski OLY
Personal information
- Born: January 26, 1984 (age 42) Bay City, Michigan, U.S.
- Height: 5 ft 9 in (175 cm)
Medal record
Men's short track speed skating
Representing the United States
Olympic Games
Bronze medal – third place	2006 Turin	5000 m relay
World Championships
Bronze medal – third place	2005 Beijing	5000 m relay
Bronze medal – third place	2006 Minneapolis	5000 m relay

Alex "Izzy" Izykowski (born January 26, 1984) is an American short track speed skater. He competed in the 2006 Winter Olympics of Turin in the 1500m, and was also part of the bronze medal winning 5000m relay.
