= Viktor An =

Korean-Russian short track speed skater

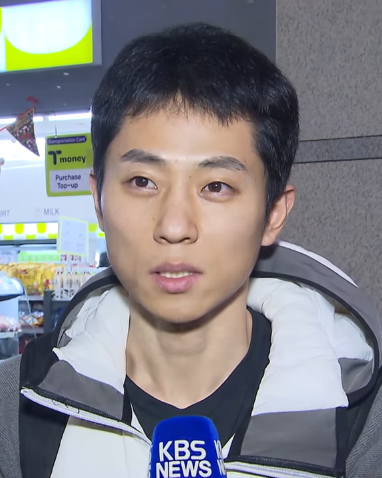
- Ahn in 2016

Personal information
- Born: Ahn Hyun-soo 안현수; November 23, 1985 (age 40) Seoul, South Korea
- Height: 1.70 m (5 ft 7 in)
- Weight: 65 kg (143 lb)
- Spouse: Woo Nari (m. 2014)

Sport
- Country: South Korea (until 2011); Russia (since 2011)
- Sport: Short track speed skating
- Retired: April 27, 2020

Achievements and titles
- World finals: World Championship; 2014 Overall; 2007 Overall; 2006 Overall; 2005 Overall; 2004 Overall; 2003 Overall; World Cup; 2006 Overall; 2004 Overall
- Personal bests: 500 m: 39.961 (2019); 1000 m: 1:23.487 (2013); 1500 m: 2:10.639 (2003, Former WR); 3000 m: 4:32.646 (2003, Former WR)
Medal record
Event	1st	2nd	3rd
Olympic Games	6	0	2
World Championships	20	10	5
World Team Championships	2	3	1
European Championships	8	6	2
World Junior Championships	4	0	1
Winter Universiade	3	0	1
Asian Games	5	1	0
Total	48	20	12
Representing Russia
Olympic Games
Gold medal – first place	2014 Sochi	500 m
Gold medal – first place	2014 Sochi	1000 m
Gold medal – first place	2014 Sochi	5000 m relay
Bronze medal – third place	2014 Sochi	1500 m
World Championships
Gold medal – first place	2014 Montreal	Overall
Gold medal – first place	2014 Montreal	1000 m
Silver medal – second place	2013 Debrecen	500 m
Silver medal – second place	2013 Debrecen	5000 m relay
Bronze medal – third place	2014 Montreal	3000 m
Bronze medal – third place	2017 Rotterdam	3000 m
European Championships
Gold medal – first place	2013 Malmö	5000 m relay
Gold medal – first place	2014 Debrecen	Overall
Gold medal – first place	2014 Debrecen	500 m
Gold medal – first place	2014 Debrecen	1000 m
Gold medal – first place	2014 Debrecen	3000 m
Gold medal – first place	2014 Debrecen	5000 m relay
Gold medal – first place	2015 Dordrecht	500 m
Gold medal – first place	2015 Dordrecht	5000 m relay
Silver medal – second place	2013 Malmö	1000m
Silver medal – second place	2015 Dordrecht	Overall
Silver medal – second place	2015 Dordrecht	3000 m
Silver medal – second place	2017 Turin	5000 m relay
Silver medal – second place	2018 Dresden	500 m
Silver medal – second place	2018 Dresden	5000 m relay
Bronze medal – third place	2013 Malmö	500 m
Bronze medal – third place	2017 Turin	500 m
Representing South Korea
Olympic Games
Gold medal – first place	2006 Turin	1000 m
Gold medal – first place	2006 Turin	1500 m
Gold medal – first place	2006 Turin	5000 m relay
Bronze medal – third place	2006 Turin	500 m
World Championships
Gold medal – first place	2002 Montreal	5000 m relay
Gold medal – first place	2003 Warsaw	Overall
Gold medal – first place	2003 Warsaw	1500 m
Gold medal – first place	2003 Warsaw	3000 m
Gold medal – first place	2003 Warsaw	5000 m relay
Gold medal – first place	2004 Gothenburg	Overall
Gold medal – first place	2004 Gothenburg	1000 m
Gold medal – first place	2004 Gothenburg	1500 m
Gold medal – first place	2004 Gothenburg	3000 m
Gold medal – first place	2004 Gothenburg	5000 m relay
Gold medal – first place	2005 Beijing	Overall
Gold medal – first place	2005 Beijing	1500 m
Gold medal – first place	2006 Minneapolis	Overall
Gold medal – first place	2006 Minneapolis	1000 m
Gold medal – first place	2006 Minneapolis	1500 m
Gold medal – first place	2007 Milan	Overall
Gold medal – first place	2007 Milan	1000 m
Gold medal – first place	2007 Milan	5000 m relay
Silver medal – second place	2002 Montreal	Overall
Silver medal – second place	2002 Montreal	1000 m
Silver medal – second place	2002 Montreal	3000 m
Silver medal – second place	2003 Warsaw	1000 m
Silver medal – second place	2005 Beijing	1000 m
Silver medal – second place	2005 Beijing	3000 m
Silver medal – second place	2005 Beijing	5000 m relay
Silver medal – second place	2007 Milan	3000 m
Bronze medal – third place	2005 Beijing	500 m
Bronze medal – third place	2007 Milan	500 m
Bronze medal – third place	2007 Milan	1500 m
World Team Championships
Gold medal – first place	2004 St. Petersburg	Team
Gold medal – first place	2006 Montréal	Team
Silver medal – second place	2003 Sofia	Team
Silver medal – second place	2005 Chuncheon	Team
Silver medal – second place	2007 Budapest	Team
Bronze medal – third place	2002 Milwaukee	Team
World Junior Championships
Gold medal – first place	2002 Chuncheon	Overall
Gold medal – first place	2002 Chuncheon	1000 m
Gold medal – first place	2002 Chuncheon	1500 m
Gold medal – first place	2002 Chuncheon	2000 m relay
Bronze medal – third place	2002 Chuncheon	1500 m S.F.
Winter Universiade
Gold medal – first place	2005 Innsbruck	1500 m
Gold medal – first place	2005 Innsbruck	3000 m
Gold medal – first place	2005 Innsbruck	5000 m relay
Bronze medal – third place	2005 Innsbruck	1000 m
Asian Winter Games
Gold medal – first place	2003 Aomori	1000 m
Gold medal – first place	2003 Aomori	1500 m
Gold medal – first place	2003 Aomori	5000 m relay
Gold medal – first place	2007 Changchun	1000 m
Gold medal – first place	2007 Changchun	5000 m relay
Silver medal – second place	2007 Changchun	1500 m

- Victor An
- Hangul: 빅토르 안
- Hanja: 빅토르 安
- RR: Biktoreu An
- MR: Pikt'orŭ An

Ahn Hyun-soo
- Hangul: 안현수
- Hanja: 安賢洙
- RR: An Hyeonsu
- MR: An Hyŏnsu

Viktor An (Russian: Виктор Ан; born Ahn Hyun-soo (Korean: 안현수) on November 23, 1985) is a South Korean-born Russian short-track speed skating coach and retired short-track speed skater. With a total of eight Olympic medals, six gold and two bronze, he is the only short track speed skater in Olympic history to win gold in every distance, and the first to win a medal in every distance at a single Games. He has the most Olympic gold medals in the sport, three of which he won in the 2006 Winter Olympics and the other three in the 2014 Winter Olympics. Considered to be the greatest short track speed skater of all time, he is a six-time overall World champion (2003–2007, 2014), two-time overall World Cup winner (2003–04, 2005–06), and the 2014 European champion. He holds the most overall titles at the World Short Track Speed Skating Championships, and is the only male short track skater to win five consecutive world titles.

In 2008, Ahn suffered a knee injury and could not regain his health by the time the national qualifiers for Vancouver 2010 came around. His recovery being slow and his South Korean local team dissolved in 2010, Ahn, aiming for his second Olympics, became a Russian citizen the next year and began racing for the Russian team. After winning gold in Sochi, Ahn explained his reasons for joining the Russian team saying, "I wanted to train in the best possible environment and I proved my decision was not wrong." As expected, a gold-winning athlete leaving the national team caused public uproar in South Korea. However, it was aimed not at Ahn, but at the country's skating union. Most South Korean fans in a poll said they understood his decision. Ahn continued his skating career in his adopted nation until 2019 and declared his retirement in April 2020.

In 2023, Ahn returned to Korea as a short track leader. Ahn returned to South Korea and applied to be a coach for Seongnam's short track speed skating team, despite having renounced his South Korean citizenship when becoming Russian. However, since his change in 2014 he had been increasingly criticized for his work in Russia amid the Russo-Ukrainian War and his coaching position in the Chinese team at the 2022 Winter Olympics in Beijing. Some Korean coaches have formed The Korea Skating Coaches' Union and urged "Seongnam to appoint a coach that meets the public eye level" and criticized Ahn that he "lied during the naturalization process and betrayed his country". He was criticized by the public for betraying his country by transferring Korean sports skills to Russia and China. Ahn was eventually denied the coaching position due to significant public opposition.

After being denied his position as Seongnam City Hall coach due to strong public opposition, Ahn explained the controversy he knew about his loss of nationality in advance and receives a full Olympic medal pension prior to Russian naturalization. He said: "I donated every pension I had received prior to naturalization". According to his explanation and a Korean ice skating official mentioned in Chosun Ilbo shortly thereafter, the entire lump sum pension he received was spent on rehabilitating "children who needed heart surgery and Korean junior players". He made his debut as a Korean sports leader when he was named a coach in the 2023–2024 national team trials at the request of younger members. The Korea Skating Union officially announced this through the Yonhap News Agency, and the Korean media reported it collectively.

== Early life and education ==
Ahn began skating in 1993 in his first year of primary school. The first time he watched the sport on television was during the 1994 Winter Olympics in Lillehammer where one of his heroes, Chae Ji-hoon, took gold in the 500 m and silver in the 1000 m for South Korea. Incidentally, these were the Games where Russia achieved a national record of 11 Olympic golds, a feat that he himself would help to repeat twenty years later. His coach, Kim Ki-hoon, was a three-time Olympic gold medalist who scouted Ahn and continued to train him. He trained ten hours every day from techniques, speed, and endurance to video analysis.

== Career ==
=== 2000s ===
==== Early career and the 2002 Winter Olympics ====
Ahn made his international debut at the World Junior Short Track Speed Skating Championships in 2002. Finishing first in the 1500 m, 1000 m, and 5000 m relay events, he claimed the overall title.

Ahn then participated in the 2002 Winter Olympics in Salt Lake City. He made the finals for the 1000 m event but returned home without a medal, after a controversial fall involving Apolo Ohno, Li Jiajun, and Mathieu Turcotte that allowed Australian Steve Bradbury to sweep the gold medal. Ahn finished in fourth place, behind Ohno and Turcotte.

After the 2002 Olympics, Ahn finished second to Kim Dong-sung at his first senior-level world championship competition the same year, almost duplicating Kim's feat of winning both the Junior and Senior World Championship titles in 1997.

Ahn began dominating the sport from the 2002–2003 season. As well as claiming four overall and 1500 m World Championship titles in a row between 2003 and 2006, Ahn excelled himself at 1000 m and 3000 m during that period and also starred with the Republic of Korea's 5000 m relay team. In all, he won a total of 23 medals in that prolific spell, and took the 2004 and 2006 World Cup titles for good measure. He also set the world records for the 1500 m in 2003 at World Cup #2 in Marquette and the 3000 m at World Cup #4 in Beijing, which he held for the following eight years.

===== National team 'recommendation system' =====
South Korea has produced many outstanding short track speed skaters and is highly competitive in selecting the national team. Their key method of selecting players is to automatically select the best players in advance according to the comprehensive podium rankings of the World Championships. However, there is a system that has disappeared after much controversy and factional fight. It was the 'recommendation system'.

South Korea's elite sports system was strictly a top-down relationship between leaders and athletes. and the factions were formed according to the leaders and the factions of the players were also determined by their universities and leaders. And the players was disadvantaged if he disobeyed the instructions from the factional leader. Viktor Ahn is one of these representative players.

Ahn graduated from Korea National Sport University. His leaders were Kim Ki-hoon, a three-time Olympic champion, and Jun Myung-kyu, former vice president of the Korea Skating Union who was also the head coach of the Korean short track speed skating team from 1987 to 2002. Ahn as a junior, consistently excelled in Korea's domestic competitions and captured the Overall title at the Junior World Championships. Though he initially didn't participate in the national team trial, he was subsequently recommended to join the 2002 national team as a substitute for an injured player. This recommendation came from Park Seong-in, the president of the Korea Skating Union, and Yoo Tae-wook, the federation's director. After observing Ahn's stellar performance at the Junior World Championships, head coach Jun Myung-kyu chose him for the Olympic team. In a bold move, Jun opted for the 16-year-old, who lacked international experience, to compete in the 1000 m individual event, a decision that faced opposition from the Korea Skating Union and others. The 2002 Olympics was his Senior international debut. In addition to Ahn, many athletes and leaders were recommended by the Korea Skating Union. They were Chae Ji-hoon, Chun Lee-kyung, Kim So-hee, Choi Min-kyung Ko Gi-hyun, Lee Ho-suk, and Choi Eun-kyung, and also included were Kim Dong-sung and Kim Sun-tae, who were injured and failed to participate in the national team trials.

This referral system was used to discover talented players and give opportunities to injured players. However, there were players who were alienated, which led to conflict. In 2006, the recommendation system for selection of representative players of the Korea Skating Union disappeared from the national team trials as the conflict of factional fighting was exposed to the public.

==== 2002–2005, KNSU and Non-KNSU ====
Factional fight in South Korean ice skating was allegedly mentioned as a form of Korea National Sport University (KNSU) and non-Korea National Sport University. But it was far more complicated inside. The power struggle of first-generation ice skating leaders, which started in the 1990s, changed form and influenced leaders, their direct disciples and athletes and changed their relationship. In 2002, when Ahn became a member of the national team, it was the time when Korean society was noisy due to the corruption of the ice skating world. Athletes and parents, who were University entrance students, gave money to professors who were influential in the ice skating world, and the professor received it. And the person who reported the case and accused his senior of corruption is Jun Myung-Kyu who becomes professor at the Korea National Sport University. In June 2003, Ahn decided to enter the Korea National Sport University in spite of exceptional conditions, including the guarantee of professor posts in other universities. The recommendation system that selected Ahn for the national team in 2002 had been in place since 1995, even before Ahn's inclusion. but in the process, At 16, he became the emblematic figure of the Korea National Sport University and professor Jun. And those on the other side accused 16-year-old Ahn of being responsible for factional conflicts in Korea's skating world.

In 2003–2004, when Ahn's heyday began, conflicts in the ice skating world and the tyranny of leaders were serious. In the national team Jun Myung-kyu stepped down from his post due to poor performance at the 2002 Salt Lake Olympics, and Olympic medalists Kim Ki-hoon took over the men's national team, but in 2004, Kim was forced to resign due to the controversy over forcing his athletes to wear skates made by the family-run skating company. In November 2004, Choi Eun-kyung, Byun Chun-sa etc. six women's team members left the athletes' village due to the coach's habitual beating scandal. The coaches for the women's team have all been replaced. Two months later, Ahn was assaulted at the Winter Universiade in January 2005. The men's team coach Yoon had to resign after the World Team Championships in March due to controversy over match-fixing and assault allegations raised at the time. Kim Ki-hoon was reelected coach of the men's team for the Turin 2006 Olympics instead of Yoon Jae-Myung. However, in April 2005, seven other non-Korea National Sport University athletes, with the exception of Ahn Hyun-soo, declined to enter the athletes' village. They insisted, The main person is fixed. We can't trust a coach who favours a specific player. At the end of the day, Kim Ki-hoon resigns, saying, "I can't teach these players anymore." Kim Ki-hoon was professor Jun's direct disciple. Kim is known to have passed on special know-how skating skills to Ahn.

Kim Ki-hoon mentioned in an interview in 2018: "Ahn hyun-soo was really outstanding. Teach him one thing and he really absorbs it in like a sponge. Ahn was not the only one to teach more. I coached everyone on the national team, but Ahn came to see me more often."

==== 2005, Conflict with Korea Skating Union ====
Ahn was reported to be the victim of senior player Seo Ho-jin's assault at the 2005 Winter Universiade. Though Seo was expelled from the national team and Yoon Jae-myung, head coach for the event, was dismissed on charges of match-fixing, Seo returned to the national team for the 2006 Winter Olympics the next year.

Ahn refused to join the national team and take training in 2005 and also confronted with the leaders of the Korea Skating Union. In July 2005, parents and coaches, including Ahn and Choi Eun-kyung, Sung Si-bak held a press conference and exposed coach Yoon Jae-myung's Aiding and abetting assault. It also called for the resignation of all federation leaders and announced its absence from the 2006 Turin Olympics. As a result, coach Yoon's appointment has been canceled. However, the conflict at that time was at its peak. At the height of the conflict, the Korea Skating Union dismissed the national team coach Chun Jae-Su, who had called for the resignation of the entire leadership, accusing him of stirring unrest among parents and athletes. He was subsequently suspended for six months. As a result, Ahn declined to train with the national team. Parents further alleged that there was political pressure exerted by a national assembly member associated with the Korean Ministry of Culture, Sports and Tourism. This situation led Ahn to train with the women's team instead of the men's, presenting considerable challenges leading up to the 2006 Olympics. Prior to his naturalization in Russia in 2011, Ahn mentioned that during this difficult time, Sung Si-bak and Lee Seung-hoon, who weren't then part of the national team, supported him.

The issue came back to the fore after Ahn's victory as a Russian in the 2014 Winter Olympics, as the South Korean public questioned the Korea Skating Union of losing their biggest Olympic star. Regarding the uproar against him, Seo argued that the incident was just a form of discipline from senior to junior, but Ahn revealed in 2015 that he and his junior were hit with helmets on.

In 2014, some Korean media outlets criticized that there was a line that went down from Jun Myung-kyu - Kim Ki-hoon - Ahn Hyun-soo and it couldn't just blame the fact that the alienated players who became coaches held Ahn Hyun-soo in check to oppose Jun Myung-kyu, and Ahn Hyun-soo also wanted it or not, he also could not be free from the responsibility of factional fighting. However, in May 2005, The Hankyoreh newspaper reported:

The officials of the Korea Skating Union were investigated by police for receiving money from the father of a player who was disqualified for hitting a junior player at a Universiade in Austria earlier this year to return his son to the national team.

==== 2006 Winter Olympics ====
At the 2006 Winter Olympics, Ahn won gold medals in the 1500 m and 1000 m events. He set a new Olympic record time of 1:26.739 in the 1000 m, finishing ahead of teammate Lee Ho-suk and rival Ohno. Ahn also won gold in men's 5000 m relay along with teammates Lee Ho-suk, Seo Ho-jin, and Song Suk-woo. With his patented outside overtaking maneuver, he overtook defending champion Canada to get his third gold medal of the Games. Ahn became the second South Korean athlete ever to win three gold medals in one Olympics, following Jin Sun-yu who had accomplished this earlier on the same day. He also won a bronze medal in the 500 m event. Ahn was the only athlete in Turin to step on to the podium four times.

Ahn became the first short track speed skater to win a medal in every distance at a single Games, a feat unprecedented by any athlete in his sport. He is the first South Korean man to win at least 3 medals in a single Winter Olympics.

Following the 2006 Olympics, Ahn maintained his record at the 2006 World Championships in Minneapolis. Despite being disqualified in the finals of the 500 m and 3000 m events, his victories in both the 1000 m and 1500 m events helped him defend his title with 68 points, followed by countryman Lee Ho-suk with 60 points. He became the first male short track skater to win four consecutive world titles.

==== After Torino ====
After the 2006 World Championships, Ahn flew back to South Korea. At Incheon International Airport, Ahn's father had a loud quarrel with the vice president of the Korea Skating Union (KSU), claiming that the coach did not associate with Ahn and conspired with other skaters to prevent Ahn from winning the title of overall champion.

Ahn collided with Lee Ho-suk and Oh Se-jong in the World Championship 3000m Super Final. The airport incident, which was reported on news screens, caused a stir in the media and the public along with factional issues. As a result, the Korea Skating Union said it would hold a committee meeting to consider disciplinary action. On April 26, 2006, the reward and punishment committee concluded that "it was not an intentional collision after playing the videos more than 100 times," and that Ahn Hyun-soo, Lee Ho-suk, and Oh Se-jong were all unintentional.

The South Korean short track team was split into two groups, in one of which Ahn was being coached by the women's coach Park Sae-woo due to conflicts with the men's coach Song Jae-kun. even though Ahn was the main player winning the gold medal in the Turin Olympics 5000m relay, the men's team members held a ceremony to their mentor commentator Lee Joon-ho, excluding only Ahn Hyun-soo. The tensions had risen so high that the skaters refused to dine in the same room, sit next to each other on the plane, or even share the same floor with each other. Ahn and Lee Ho-suk used to attend the same high school together, and even shared a room the previous year in skating camps, but due to the conflict they had begun to rarely speak to each other. Ahn mentioned on his personal website that the pressure was too much for him and he contemplated quitting the sport. Due to the issue, KSU stated that starting next season, the team would be united under one head coach to prevent deleterious rivalries.

In spite of the conflicts, Ahn continued to dominate the sport. At the 2007 World Championships held in Milan, Ahn won his fifth world championship, finishing first in the 1000 m and in the 5000 m relay with teammates Kim Byeong-jun, Sung Si-bak, Song Kyung-taek, and Kim Hyun-kon. He also won silver in the 3000 m behind Song, and won two bronze medals in the 500 m and the 1500 m. With this victory, Ahn became the first man to win five consecutive world championships. Ahn is the only male short track skater to have won at least three consecutive world championships; Canadian short track legend Marc Gagnon has won four times, but his titles did not come back to back.

==== Injury in early 2008 ====
On January 16, 2008, the Korea Skating Union (KSU) reported that Ahn had injured his knee after colliding with a fence during national team training at the Korea Training Center in Taeneung. The skate blade got stuck on the ice then the Ahn fell and bumped his knee on the fence. The fence, placed to absorb the shock, froze hard like a rock, causing serious injury rather than absorbing the impact. After being sent to the hospital, the injury was diagnosed as a fractured knee.

Due to the injury, KSU announced that Ahn would not be competing in the ISU Samsung World Cup Series #5 and #6 in Quebec City and Salt Lake City, respectively. It was also reported that he would not be competing in the 2008 World Championships in Gangneung or the 2008 World Team Championships in Harbin, China. As a result of the unexpected injury, it was clear that Ahn would be unable to defend his sixth World title, leaving his countrymen Lee Ho-suk, Song Kyung-taek, and Lee Seung-hoon to make up the ground. After undergoing three surgeries, his rehabilitation period was predicted to be around 2–3 months.

After eight months off the ice, a South Korean news article reported on September 5, 2008, that Ahn was back training, undergoing approximately two hours of physical reinforcement and skating along with around five hours of rehabilitation accompanied by muscular power training. The article also reported that Ahn was eyeing the 2010 Winter Olympics in Vancouver, Canada.

However, his recovery from the injury was much slower than initially expected, and he had to undergo four surgeries in 15 months.

In 2009, Ahn finished seventh overall at the Korean national team trials, which was not enough for him to qualify for the Olympic team. Not having fully recovered from his injury, he again was unable to qualify for the national team in the following season.

=== 2010s ===
==== 2010, Conflict with Korea Skating Union ====
After the 2010 Vancouver Winter Olympics, the Korean short track was embroiled in scandals such as match-fixing and internal factions. Deals for rights of Olympic and World Championship participation took place among athletes and coaches of the same faction. However, this soon caused divisions between the athletes leading to subsequent exposures. The word of these incidents spread among the athletes' parents and was exposed by Ahn Hyun-soo's father. Ahn Hyun-Soo's father has decided to reveal the match-fixing of the national team trial for the 2010 Winter Olympic Games in Vancouver due to various reasons.

A family of Lee Jung-su noticed that Lee lost his opportunity to participate individual event for the World Championship. Moreover, Lee Jung-Su had to forcefully write down an oath stating that he will not participate the World Championship as demanded by his coaches and head coach. The family of Lee has informed this event to the other parents of the athletes, and they have decided to report the Korea Skating Union to Korean Sports Council Investigation Committee for thorough investigation. They started a petition for the investigation and more than 200 people agreed to join the petition, yet more than 300 people's engagement was needed in order to file the case to the committee. In this sense, they requested the father of Ahn who is influential to the public to post this scandal on his son' s Fan Club Page and finally this scandal has been completely revealed to Korean society and the public. This incident had a huge impact. The players involved and the Vancouver Olympic coaches have all been disciplined. The leaders of the Korea Skating Union were all forced to resign.

Ahn Ki-won, Ahn Hyun-soo's father, pointed out the Korea Skating Union's leadership, including the then-resigned vice president Yoo Tae-wook and Jun Myung-kyu, for exerting undue pressure on coaches and athletes.

Ahn became a whistleblower who informed the South Korean society of the dark side of Korean shorttrack speed skating of factional fight and match-fixing regardless of his will. And it took a toll on him, officially or informally. The selection of the national team was suddenly postponed, and Ahn Hyun-soo, overlapped with the four-week basic military training period, disrupted his own training plan. Suspicions have also been raised that he missed an Olympic opportunity by disobeying the factional leader's words. Noise and controversy continued around him regarding factional issues and the way the national team was selected.

And his team Seongnam declared a moratorium in July 2010 and decided to dismantle the ice skating team in December 2010. But there was not a team to scouted Ahn Hyun-soo.

==== Naturalization to Russia ====
Ahn last competed as a South Korean citizen at the national team trials in April 2011, where he took gold in the 500 m. Prior to the trials, his local team Seongnam City Hall dissolved due to financial reasons, and therefore Ahn had to train by himself. Shortly before this competition, he informed the South Korean media that it would be his farewell performance. Ahn finished fifth overall at the national team trials. After the trials, Ahn announced that he will be moving to Russia because he wanted to skate in an environment where he could concentrate on skating, apart from the issues surrounding him.

He moved to Russia in June 2011 and decided to naturalize in July. On December 28, 2011, he was officially granted a Russian nationality by President Dmitry Medvedev. His Korean nationality was automatically extinguished by the South Korean nationality law, which does not allow dual nationality. Since then, South Korean media has reported that he received the full Olympic medal pension in July 2011, and decided to naturalized to Russia in August. Based on this, when the Korea skating coach union pointed out "pension receipt" due to "morality" issues in the process of hiring Seongnam coach in 2023, Viktor Ahn said he decided on everything in July 2011 and donated the entire pension just before Russian naturalization for the first time in 12 years.

In a 2015 documentary aired on South Korea's MBC, Ahn disclosed that there was pressure from a Korea Skating Union official just before his naturalization in Russia. The official warned: "This athlete is a problematic player in South Korea and should never be accepted."

==== 2011, Conflict with the South Korean coaches ====
South Korean coaches and staff were already in Russia before Ahn decided to go to Russia. But in October 2011, the Russian Skating Union fired everyone, leaving Viktor Ahn alone. According to South Korean media reports at the time, 'internal conflicts between leaders', 'South Korean experts never notified Russian coaches how to prepare skating equipment accordingly in shorttrack speed skating', 'compulsory training ' and 'corporal punishment on athletes' were the reasons for the dismissal.

At that time, however, there were rumors in South Korea that Ahn was reluctant to undergo Korean-style training again. After this incident, Ahn's wife Woo Nari and coach Hwang Ik-hwan who were coach of his team for Seongnam just before his naturalization, were invited to Russia for Viktor Ahn's rehabilitation and psychotherapy. Along with this incident during the 2014 Sochi Olympics, the 2004 women's short track team assault incident was re-examined. This is because the assault incident of women player team in 2004, and one of the coaches who had a conflict with Viktor Ahn in Russia in 2011 was on the coaching staff of the South Korea national team.

About this issue, coach Hwang Ik-hwan had an interview as follows. "Hyun-soo won first place in the 500m in the last national trial in Korea before going to Russia. In other words, his physical condition was not bad. However, he was in the worst slump when I met him after six months. Even after they were expelled from the Russian Skating Union, Hyun-soo could not easily get out of that wound for a while."

In 2018, an official from the Korean skating world also revealed the following. "Viktor Ahn had to went through hard time in the early days of settling in Russia. And he was able to train normally only after the Russian Skating Union fired the coach."

==== Heading to Sochi ====
Ahn participated in the Russian national team trials for the 2011–2012 season and was selected as a relay member for the season. He made his debut as a Russian short track speed skater at World Cup #5 in Moscow.

In the national trials for the 2012–2013 season, Ahn won the 1000 m and 3000 m events, successfully pulling off to the national team. At World Cup #1 in Calgary, he won his first individual gold in the international stage since his knee injury four years ago. He also contributed to Russia's first-ever relay gold at World Cup #5 in Sochi, making an inside pass that reminded of performances in his heyday.

Ahn came through the Olympic season with flying colors, finishing second in the overall World Cup rankings and winning four golds at the 2014 European Championships. While his knee injury did not allow him to top the 1500 m races that he had dominated when representing Korea, his experience, technique, and exclusive training on the 500 m helped Ahn lead the distance in the World Cup rankings.

==== 2014 Winter Olympics ====
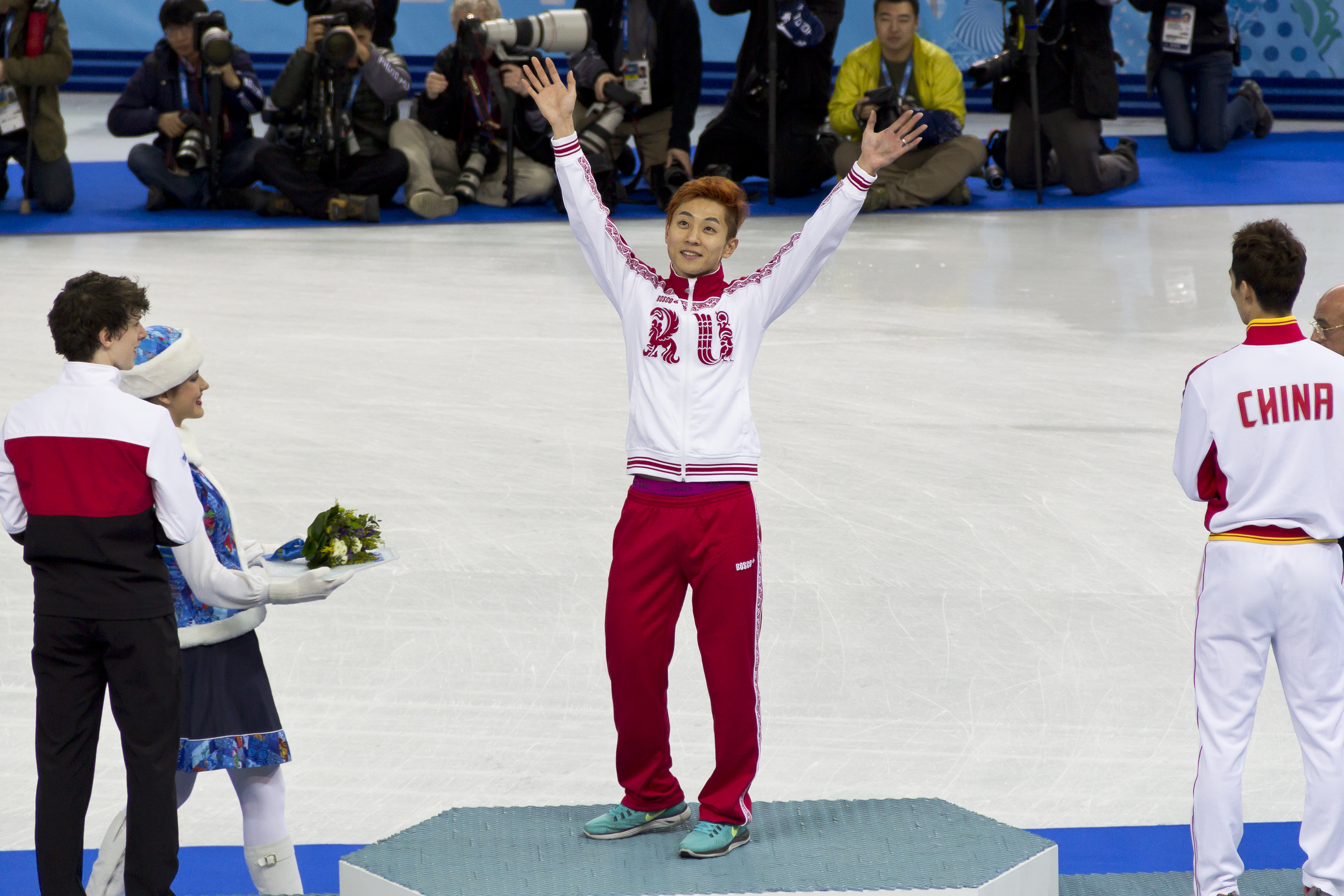
Ahn at the men's 500 m podium at the 2014 Olympics

At the 2014 Winter Olympics, Ahn won the bronze medal in the 1500 m event, which was the first short track speed skating medal that Russia had ever earned. Ahn then won the first Russian gold medal in short track, winning the 1000 m event by leading the first Russian 1–2 finish in short track with Vladimir Grigorev. On February 21, Ahn won his seventh overall and fifth Winter Olympic gold medal when he finished first in the 500 m men's final. With that gold medal, he became the first short track skater to win all four Olympic golds, the 500 m, 1000 m, 1500 m, and 5000 m relay. He also became the short track speed skater with the most Olympic gold medals, with five, which increased to six with a 5000 m relay win later the same day. With that gold, he became the short tracker with the most Olympic medals, at eight, tied with Apolo Ohno; he also became the short tracker with the most Olympic gold medals, at six.

After his victory, Koreans came to an uproar questioning the Korea Skating Union of the reason for Ahn's naturalization, which eventually caused Korean President Park Geun-hye to order an investigation on the issue. Contrary to the public opinion in Korea, Ahn contended that he did not move to Russia because of factionalism. He also added that his father, who had argued Ahn was the victim of faction fight in Korea, was contradicting him, and going to the Olympics was the sole reason why he made the difficult decision to come to Russia. Ahn expressed his concern that though his relationship with the Korean athletes had no problems, the press was making them awkward.

==== After Sochi ====
In the 2014 World Championships held a month after the Olympics, Ahn won the 1000 m and finished third in the 3000 m, grabbing his sixth world title by 63 points. He became the only man to win six world championships in the sport.

After his prolific season, Ahn continued his skating career despite a part-move into coaching. He missed the 2015–2016 season due to knee problems and his wife's pregnancy. In an interview after the 2016 World Championships, which he did not take part in but did watch, he told the press that doctors have warned him undergoing extra surgery would jeopardize his career, and thus he is working on adding muscles to relieve the pain.

Ahn continued to win medals at the World and European championships for Russia. He won bronze in the 500 m and silver in the 5000 m relay at the 2017 European Championships, and won silver in the 500 m race at the 2018 European Championships. Although Ahn had planned to retire after participating the 2018 Winter Olympics in his native South Korea, he missed out the Olympics in the wake of the alleged sports doping in Russia. The IOC did not disclose the specific reasons for banning Ahn, only mentioning "lingering suspicions" about doping use regarding the country. Ahn, who had never tested positive for drugs, challenged the decision writing an open letter to IOC president Thomas Bach, but he was not answered.

==== Retirement ====
Ahn decided to retire from the sport and return to his home country of South Korea after rejecting an offer to coach the Russian team in September 2018.

After stepping off ice, Ahn starred in the South Korean variety-reality show Real Man 300. He was also noticed working as a player-coach at Korea National Sports University.

In 2018, Ahn received an offer as a national team leader from the South Korea as well as the Russia national team. A senior South Korean official revealed in February of that year that there had been informal discussions and the final decision rested with Ahn. However, the Korea Skating Union was soon mired in controversy due to an assault on a female player and a related #MeToo incident involving a national team coach, which drew significant attention in South Korean society and led to government investigations. Amid the tumultuous events within the Korea Skating Union, Viktor Ahn's discussions to lead the South Korean national team were hindered by his controversies and lack of coaching experience. The offer ultimately dissolved when he rejoined the Russian national team for the 2019–2020 season.

In February 2019, Ahn reversed his decision, announcing that he wanted to compete as an athlete.

Aged 33, he won silver in the 500 m and 1000 m races respectively at the ISU Short Track Speed Skating World Cup in Salt Lake City and Shanghai before anchoring Russia to gold in the mixed gender 2,000 m relay and men's 5,000 m relay.

In April 2020, Ahn revealed that knee problems were affecting his ability to train and that it was time for him to finally finish his skating career. In his retirement statement, he announced he will continue to work for the sport.

=== 2020s ===
==== 2022 Winter Olympics ====
In 2018, Ahn was offered a coaching position for China's national speed skating team by Wang Meng, who had been Ahn's acquaintance since 2002. Although Ahn declined the offer in 2018, he accepted the offer in late 2019.

As the top assistant of Kim Sun-tae, head coach for China's short track team in the 2022 Winter Olympics and previous head coach for Korea's short track team in the 2018 Winter Olympics, Ahn helped Chinese players win two gold medals, one silver medal, and one bronze medal in Beijing. His training style was to skate with the athletes throughout the sessions, so that they could naturally learn how to make steps.

When Korean skaters were disqualified during the men's 1000 m semifinals, arousing short track speed skating controversies, South Korean netizens directed anger and criticism towards Ahn, who was seen congratulating his team for winning gold in the 2000 m mixed relay.

In addition, some Korean media and the public have remarked that he received an Olympic medal pension ('sports pension') just prior to his naturalization in Russia. Regarding the Olympic medal pension, he has already been confirmed to have received the most 'sports pension' among South Korean sports athletes through a parliamentary audit by the South Korean National Assembly in October 2012. During his career, he received a pension of more than 370 million won from the state.

"The receipt of the Olympic medal pension" has been raised since his naturalization, but it has not been much controversy. However, in 2021, his junior Lin Xiaojun (Lim Hyo-jun), an Olympic gold medalist, was known to have decided to naturalize to China, and major South Korean media compared Lin XiaoJun, who was naturalized to China over the repeated naturalization of Korean ace athletes to other countries and pensions for the first time in 10 years. And anti-Chinese sentiment during the 2022 Beijing Olympics has raised criticism over his receipt of the Olympic medal pension.

Not responding to interview requests during the Games, Ahn shared his thoughts on the issue in March in an interview with the Korean press by saying, "I kept a stiff upper lip because I didn't want to be an irresponsible person. Due to the nature of the sport, judgment problems can occur at any time. All players come to the game with the mindset that they should be careful about decision issues, but the unexpected often happens on ice." Regarding the accusations that were poured on not only him but also his family, Ahn said, "It suddenly occurred to me that if I gave up short track speed skating, this controversy would end," adding, "I thought I had been supported for my passion and games, but it was heartbreaking to see unexpected things lead to criticism." He yet stated that despite the adversities, he won't be leaving the sport.

After the Olympics, Ahn rejected a four-year coaching position and returned to Korea, having not met his family for 19 months due to the COVID-19 pandemic. Furthermore, Ahn declined long-term leadership offers from third countries outside of South Korea, China, and Russia.

==== Failure to return to South Korea for coaching ====
In 2023, Ahn returned to South Korea and applied to be a coach for Seongnam City's short track speed skating team. However, he is under huge criticism from the South Korean short track speed skating coaches as he has helped South Korean rival China to gain medals during the 2022 Beijing Olympics. The Korea skating coach union urged "Seongnam City to appoint a coach that meets the public eye level" and criticized Ahn that he "lied during the naturalization process and betrayed his country", avoiding the fact that Ahn was mistreated by the Korea Skating Union after his injuries. In late January, Seongnam City's short track speed skating team announced that no one is qualified to be a coach, meaning that Ahn is unlikely to be coach for his homeland. After Seongnam City has since announced that there are no successful candidates, and the city ultimately decided not to fill the vacant coaching position.

since then, the Korea skating coach union has been known as a close aide to a specific candidate, and suspicions have been raised that the disciplinary history of a specific candidate has not been raised. As a result, some South Korean media outlets suggested that there was a factional power struggle and political involvement in the ice skating world.

Following South Korea's rejection of Viktor Ahn, through TASS, Russian Skating Union president expressed that they would like to appoint Ahn. In 2022, Russia invited Viktor Ahn to become an advisor to the Skating Union, but he refused due to objections by Ahn's wife. While Russia sports media outlet Sport Express urged Ahn to return to Russia as a leader.

On February 7, Viktor Ahn expressed his position on the controversy over Russian naturalization on his social network service (SNS) after "received a lump-sum payment of the athletes' pension," which the Korea skating coach union pointed out as a moral issue. At first, he thought dual citizenship was possible. However, when he found out that he had to give up his Korean nationality, he decided that it was right to return the Olympic medal pension he received. And before naturalization in Russia, he made a full donation to "children in need of heart surgery and junior athletes in need of rehabilitation and treatment." Since then, some of the pensions have been delivered to the family of Noh Jin-kyu, his junior athlete at the Korean National Sport University, according to a South Korean ice skating official. Ahn then said that he would humbly accept the criticism of choosing naturalization for any reason, but he said he would raise speak out when there is misunderstanding.

On February 9, The Hankyoreh pointed out Seongnam City's negligence in administration in that Ahn's coaching support was exposed in advance in connection with the recruitment of the ice skating team at Seongnam. While the Korea Skating Coaches Union pointed out that it was not the opinion of the Korean ice skating leaders as a whole, and that it was a serious problem for the media to report the opinions of certain unofficial organizations as the opinions of the entire leaders.

==== South Korean leadership activities ====
On April 13, 2023, South Korean media reported as follows. Viktor Ahn will participate as a coach for multiple skaters in the 2023–24 season for the South Korean national team trials. He personally coached young skaters at the Korea National Sport University after the 2022 Beijing Olympics. Among them, seven players from high school and Korea National Sport University wrote him as a leader on the application form for participation in the national team trials. This is Ahn's first official South Korean leadership activity.

According to JTBC, Ahn completed the Korea Skating Union's "leader's lesson" in Korea after the 2022 Beijing Olympics. According to the Korea Sports Association and the Korea Skating Union Registration Regulations, which have been changed since April 12, 2021 due to years of "violation of human rights of ice sports" and "ethical controversy of ice coaches" in Korea, even a leader who has obtained a "coach national license" must complete a leader course before he can serve as a leader of the Korea Skating Union.

== Conflict with mentor ==
This issue that has been consistently mentioned due to Ahn's choice of naturalization in Russia is the issues of conflict with his mentor, Jun Myung-kyu, vice president of the Korea Skating Union. According to Korean medias, Professor Jun was the planner of all Ahn's career paths. Jun was Ahn's professor. And he was Ahn's personal coach in 2007. However, Ahn disobeyed the professor Jun's words.

In 2014, his father and Lee Joon-ho, who was the former coach of the national team, said the following. : "Ahn, was set to graduate from Korea National Sport University in 2007. Ahn chose the Seongnam City Hall Short track team that Professor Jun did not want, and the relationship between Professor Jun and Ahn was estranged". During the Olympics, Chang Myung-hee, former president of the Korea Skating Union, also said that Vice-president Jun Myung-kyu had abused his authority, and Ahn was disadvantaged. In fact, the conflict with factional leaders was also mentioned by the South Korean media in 2010. In 2018, Another a Korean skating official commented, "A mere 16 days after Viktor Ahn joined the Seongnam City Hall skating team, he sustained a severe injury during training. Subsequently, Seongnam City Hall suspended the team's operations. Ahn's strained relationship with Jun Myung-kyu, the president of Korea Ice Skating, made it challenging for him to find a suitable place to train and compete within the country."

In March 2014, Professor Jun stepped down as vice-president of the Korean Skaters Union. However, in 2014, Ahn and the Korea Skating Union denied any conflicts or factional issues.

The assault of the women's short track team coach during the 2018 PyeongChang Olympics and the athletes' discord over women's speed skating factions raised the issue of the responsibility of Samsung, which had sponsored the Korea Skating Union and the Korea Skating Union. The Korea Skating Union was investigated by the government, including the Ministry of Culture, Sports and Tourism. Viktor Ahn and Professor Jun have returned to the agenda. However, in February 2018, Viktor Ahn sent a text message to South Korean Culture, Sports and Tourism Committee Member of parliament Ahn Min-seok. Ahn Min-seok said that Ahn hyun-soo has a good relationship with Professor Jun Myung-kyu, and released it to the South Korean media.

In March 2022, Viktor Ahn said Yonhap News Agency in an interview that he had never been disadvantaged by the Korea Skating Union.

== Style ==
- "Ahn is a master of short track speed skating, particularly in controlling the track during competition." - Wu Dajing
- "In terms of his racing strategy, when he's following the other skaters, he's not really just following. He's always waiting for that perfect chance to pass." - Chae Ji-hoon
- "Viktor Ahn, as he's now called, is the most beautiful short track skating athlete in the world in terms of his technique and the way he skates." "If there is any athlete that is designed for short track, body-type wise, it is him," "If you watch him stand and jog, his pelvic is tilted forward naturally, which is perfect for a skater. He has incredible technique, tons of experience." - Apolo Anton Ohno

== Awards and honors ==
Representing Korea

Ahn was awarded the Outstanding Player Award at the Sports Chosun Coca-Cola Sports Awards in January 2006. After his victory in Torino, he was selected as Player of the Month by the American Sports Academy. He was also named as honorary ambassador for the PyeongChang Winter Olympics bidding committee with Jin Sun-yu.

In 2008, Ahn was selected as the Most Valuable Player with Lee Kyou-hyuk and Yuna Kim by the Korea Skating Union. In the same year, he also received the Men's Team Award at the Asian Sports Awards. with Lee Ho-seok, Song Suk-woo, Oh Se-jong, and Seo Ho-jin.

Ahn was chosen as the ambassador for the Korea Sports Promotion Foundation in 2009.

Representing Russia

In March 2013, Ahn was named as Merited Master of Sport by the Russian Federation.

After his feat in Sochi, Ahn was awarded the Order "For Merit to the Fatherland" from Russian president Vladimir Putin and the Medal "For Strengthening Military Cooperation". He was also selected Most Valuable Player in the Sochi Winter Olympics by NBC, and 2014 Athlete of the Year by the Russian edition of 'GQ' magazine. In light of his status as a South Korean-born Russian, Ahn was further named as honorary ambassador for the 2014–2015 Korea-Russia Year of Mutual Visit in 2014.

In 2016, Ahn received the Proud Alumnus Award at his alma mater. He was also inducted into the Korea National Sports University Ice Rink Hall of Fame as the 2006 Winter Olympics champion and the Sochi Walk of Fame as the 2014 Winter Olympics champion.

== Personal life ==
Ahn is married to Woo Nari (Korean: 우나리), a Korean born in 1983. Nari was a member of Ahn's fan club. Ahn said that her presence and care helped him adapt to Russia. Their daughter was born in December 2015. But his wife, Woo Nari, couldn't endure the life in Russia and missed South Korea, so eventually left Russia. The Russian media reported that his wife wanted to raise their daughter in South Korea, and Viktor Ahn's choice to go to South Korea was influenced by his wife.

Ahn's younger brother is speed skater Ahn Hyun-Jun. He made the Korean national speed skating team for the 2022–23 season. The younger Ahn switched from short track to speed skating in 2021.

=== Russian citizenship ===
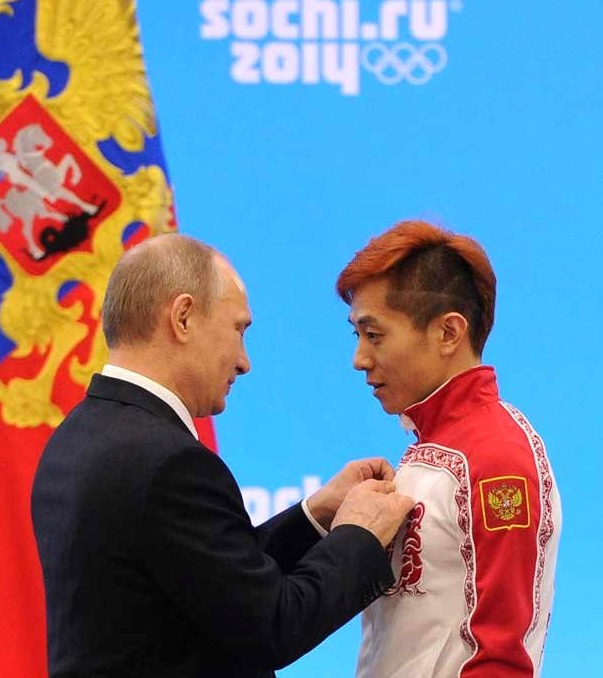
Vladimir Putin and Ahn after the 2014 Olympics

Ahn trained in Russia and received Russian citizenship to compete for Russia in the 2014 Winter Olympics. Ahn's father stated that the decision was due to lack of support from the South Korean skating association. Prior to moving to Russia, Ahn did not know the Russian language and had no familial ties to Russia. He had considered competing for the United States, but found that the process for gaining Russian citizenship was much easier. He chose "Viktor" as his Russian name as it derived from Victory, and to pay tribute to Viktor Tsoi, a Soviet rock star of ethnic Korean descent.

In South Korea, fury erupted over the loss of Ahn to Team Russia, after his participation in the 2014 Winter Olympics. Several newspapers reported the scorn of the South Korean public and newspaper editors on the actions of the skating federation. Right after the Olympics, the Minister of Sports and President Park Geun-hye of South Korea both promised action in rooting out corruption and feuding at the organization that may have led to Ahn's "defection", in a bid to clean it up in preparation for the 2018 Winter Olympics in South Korea. In September 2018, Ahn announced his retirement from short track and moved back to South Korea. The South Korean public was generally supportive of Ahn in early 2014, but he also received online bashing amidst controversies at Sochi and in later years. In 2023, Ahn sought a coaching position in South Korea, despite having renounced his South Korean citizenship when becoming Russian. He was denied that position due to significant public opposition.

=== Political issues ===
In 2011, Ahn's decision to naturalize became a contentious political issue, with some attributing the responsibility to Seongnam Mayor at the time, Lee Jae-myung. By 2014, Lee defended himself by emphasizing that the state-supervised Korea Skating Union should be held accountable rather than the leaders of Local government. A significant development occurred in February 2022 when Won Hee-ryong, associated with Yoon Suk Yeol's People's Power presidential campaign, asserted that Viktor Ahn's choice to become a Russian national was influenced by Lee Jae-myung. Won Hee-ryong further claimed that the halting of operations for the Seongnam City Hall ice skating team was a disguise for bankruptcy and alleged that 30 billion won from Seongnam's funds were diverted to acquire Seongnam FC in a bid to boost the mayor's re-election prospects. The Democratic Party of Korea refuted the allegations, deeming them false. Concurrently, Korean ice skating officials emphasized the difficulty in isolating a single cause, especially when injuries and team disbandments coincided with ongoing factional controversies within the ice skating community. As of 2022, Lee Jae-myung faces legal scrutiny for allegedly accepting 17 billion won in unauthorized bribes from companies, masked as donations to Seongnam FC.

== Notes ==
He can restore his South Korean nationality under the South Korean nationality law. (Note: South Korean nationality law Article 9 (Acquisition of Nationality through Reinstatement of Nationality) (1) A foreigner who was a national of the Republic of Korea may acquire the nationality of the Republic of Korea through obtaining permission of reinstatement of nationality by the Minister of Justice. (2) The Minister of Justice shall not allow the reinstatement of nationality to a person who falls under any of the following subparagraphs, after screening such person who has applied for the reinstatement of nationality.: 1. A person who has inflicted harm on the State or society; 2. A person whose conduct is disorderly; 3. A person who lost or renounced his/her nationality of the Republic of Korea in order to evade military service; 4. A person for whom the Minister of Justice regards the reinstatement of his/her nationality as inappropriate, for the purposes of national security, sustainment of order or public welfare.) In 2003, at the age of 17, he was exempted from military service by winning three gold medals at the Asian Games and finished his four-weeks of basic military training in 2010. For sports personnels who are exempted from active duty are recognized to have completed 34 months of military service if they have spent time as athletes in their field. In September 2018, A South Korean Ministry of National Defense official said in an interview with South Korean media. "Ahn hyun-soo has already completed his military service".

But if Ahn gets his South Korean citizenship back, he has to renounce his Russian citizenship.

== In the media ==
In the 2010–2011 season, Ahn served as a short track commentator for SBS Sports. He covered the World Cup series (#3~#6) and the World Championships.

From 2014 to 2016, he guest-starred in three episodes of Russia's late-night talk show Evening Urgant (episodes S3.E90, S4.E104, S5.E157).

From 2017 to 2018, Ahn guest-starred in the South Korean variety-reality show The Return of Superman (episodes 202~204, 237, 241) with his daughter.

In 2018, he starred in the South Korean variety-reality show Real Man 300 (episodes 1~15, 18).

Other television appearances of Ahn are as follows:

- Han Su-jin's Sunday Click (South Korean talk show) - with Jin Sun-yu (episode 49)
- Human Docu Love (South Korean documentary) - with wife Woo Nari (episodes 44, 45)
- Live Talk Show Taxi (South Korean talk show) - with wife Woo Nari (episode 488)

== Detailed results ==
=== Olympics results ===
Competition Location	Date	Rank	Event	Video
2002 Winter Olympics (United States) Salt Lake Ice Center	13–23 February 2002	13	1500 m	
2002 Winter Olympics (United States) Salt Lake Ice Center	13–23 February 2002	4	1000 m	
2002 Winter Olympics (United States) Salt Lake Ice Center	13–23 February 2002	DNS	500 m	
2002 Winter Olympics (United States) Salt Lake Ice Center	13–23 February 2002	DNS	5000 m relay	
2006 Winter Olympics (Italy) Torino Palavela	February 13, 2006	(gold) 1	1500 m	
2006 Winter Olympics (Italy) Torino Palavela	February 19, 2006	(gold) 1	1000 m (Note: 2006 Winter Olympics – Men's 1000 m Former, (OR).)	
2006 Winter Olympics (Italy) Torino Palavela	February 25, 2006	(bronze) 3	500 m	
2006 Winter Olympics (Italy) Torino Palavela	February 25, 2006	(gold) 1	5000 m relay (Note: 2006 Winter Olympics – Men's 5000 m relay Former, (OR).)	
2014 Winter Olympics (Russia) Iceberg Skating Palace	February 10, 2014	(bronze) 3	1500 m	
2014 Winter Olympics (Russia) Iceberg Skating Palace	February 15, 2014	(gold) 1	1000 m	
2014 Winter Olympics (Russia) Iceberg Skating Palace	February 21, 2014	(gold) 1	500 m	
2014 Winter Olympics (Russia) Iceberg Skating Palace	February 21, 2014	(gold) 1	5000 m relay (Note: 2014 Winter Olympics – Men's 5000 m relay Former, (OR).)	

=== World Championships Podiums results ===
Six-time Overall world champion. 20 world titles. 18 gold medals.

Event	Gold	Silver	Bronze	podiums
Overall	6 x	1 x		7
500m		1 x	2 x	3
1000m	4 x	3 x		7
1500m	4 x		1 x	5
3 000 m (Note: super-final involving eight competitors with highest points after completion of other distances. 2002 (2nd), 2003 (1st), 2004 (1st), 2005 (2nd), 2006 (DSQ), 2007 (2nd), 2013 (7th), 2014 (3rd), 2017 (3rd). The 3000m Super Final is not awarded a medal, but the ranking and record are recognized.)	(2)	(3)	(2)	(7)
distances	14 x	5 x	3 x	22 (29)
relay	4 x	2 x		6
Total	18 (20)	7 (10)	3 (5)	28 (35)

Overall points and medals results

Date	Competition Location	Rank	Event
5-7 April 2002	2002 (Canada) Montreal	2 (42 points) (Note: 42 points : 1000 m (21) + 3000 m (21))	Overall
5-7 April 2002	2002 (Canada) Montreal	2	1000m
5-7 April 2002	2002 (Canada) Montreal	2	3000m
5-7 April 2002	2002 (Canada) Montreal	1	Relay
19-21 March 2003	2003 (Poland) Warsaw	1 (89 points) (Note: 89 points : 1000 m (21) + 1500 m (34) + 3000 m (34))	Overall
19-21 March 2003	2003 (Poland) Warsaw	2	1000m
19-21 March 2003	2003 (Poland) Warsaw	1	1500m
19-21 March 2003	2003 (Poland) Warsaw	1	3000m
19-21 March 2003	2003 (Poland) Warsaw	1	Relay
19–21 April 2004	2004 (Sweden) Gothenburg	1 (102 points) (Note: 102 points : 1000 m (34) + 1500 m (34) + 3000 m (34))	Overall
19–21 April 2004	2004 (Sweden) Gothenburg	1	1000m
19–21 April 2004	2004 (Sweden) Gothenburg	1	1500m
19–21 April 2004	2004 (Sweden) Gothenburg	1	3000m
19–21 April 2004	2004 (Sweden) Gothenburg	1	Relay
5–6 March 2005	2005 (China) Beijing	1 (89 points) (Note: 89 points : 500 m (13) + 1000 m (21) + 1500 m (34) + 3000 m (21))	Overall
5–6 March 2005	2005 (China) Beijing	3	500m
5–6 March 2005	2005 (China) Beijing	2	1000m
5–6 March 2005	2005 (China) Beijing	1	1500m
5–6 March 2005	2005 (China) Beijing	2	3000m
5–6 March 2005	2005 (China) Beijing	2	Relay
29–31 March 2006	2006 (United States) Minneapolis	1 (68 points) (Note: 68 points : 1000 m (34) + 1500 m (34))	Overall
29–31 March 2006	2006 (United States) Minneapolis	1	1000m
29–31 March 2006	2006 (United States) Minneapolis	1	1500m
9–11 March 2007	2007 (Italy) Milan	1 (81 points) (Note: 81 points : 500 m (13) + 1000 m (34) + 1500 m (13) + 3000 m (21))	Overall
9–11 March 2007	2007 (Italy) Milan	3	500m
9–11 March 2007	2007 (Italy) Milan	1	1000m
9–11 March 2007	2007 (Italy) Milan	3	1500m
9–11 March 2007	2007 (Italy) Milan	2	3000m
9–11 March 2007	2007 (Italy) Milan	1	Relay
14–16 March 2013	2013 (Hungary) Debrecen	6 (23 points) (Note: 23 points : 500 m (21) + 3000 m (2))	Overall
14–16 March 2013	2013 (Hungary) Debrecen	2	500m
14–16 March 2013	2013 (Hungary) Debrecen	7	3000m
14–16 March 2013	2013 (Hungary) Debrecen	2	Relay
14–16 March 2014	2014 (Canada) Montreal	1 (63 points) (Note: 63 points : 500 m (8) + 1000 m (34) + 1500 m (8) + 3000 m (13))	Overall
14–16 March 2014	2014 (Canada) Montreal	4	500m
14–16 March 2014	2014 (Canada) Montreal	1	1000m
14–16 March 2014	2014 (Canada) Montreal	4	1500m
14–16 March 2014	2014 (Canada) Montreal	3	3000m
10–12 March 2017	2017 (Hungary) Debrecen	7 (23 points) (Note: 23 points : 500 m (2) + 1500 m (8) + 3000 m (13))	Overall
10–12 March 2017	2017 (Hungary) Debrecen	7	500m
10–12 March 2017	2017 (Hungary) Debrecen	4	1500m
10–12 March 2017	2017 (Hungary) Debrecen	3	3000m

World Team Championships

Team South Korea
date	Competition Location	rank
29-30 March 2002	Team 2002 (United States) Milwaukee	3
15-16 March 2003	Team 2003 (Bulgaria) Sofia	2
13-14 March 2004	Team 2004 (Russia) Saint Petersburg	1
5-6 March 2005	Team 2005 (South Korea) Chuncheon	2
25-26 March 2006	Team 2006 (Canada) Montreal	1
17-18 March 2007	Team 2007 (Hungary) Budapest	2

=== World Cup Podiums results ===
2 times Overall World Cup winner, 6 time individual distances World Cup winner, 67 World Cup victories

World Cup Ranking
Event	1st	2nd	3rd	podiums
Overall	2	3	1	6
500m	2	1	1	4
1000m	2	4	1	7
1500m	2	4	1	7
Total	8	12	4	24
World Cup medals
Event	gold	Silver	bronze	podiums
Overall	7	3	5	15
500m	6	4	2	12
1000m	13	10	5	28
1500m	16	7	5	28
3000m	6	6	2	14
distances	48	30	19	97
Relay	19	7	6	32
medals	67 x	37 x	25 x	129
Total	75 x	49 x	29 x	153

World Cup Ranking Podiums

season	Overall	500m	1000m	1500m
2002-03	2nd	3rd	3rd	2nd
2003-04	1st	2nd	1st	1st
2004-05	3rd	-	2nd	2nd
2005-06	1st	1st	2nd	1st
2007-08	2nd	-	1st	2nd
2012-13	-	-	2nd	2nd
2013-14	2nd	1st	2nd	3rd
Podiums	6	4	7	7
Total	24			

=== World Cup medals results ===
==== 67 Gold medals ====
gold medals
No.	Competition Location	Event
1	2002-03 (South Korea) Chuncheon	Overall
2	2002-03 (South Korea) Chuncheon	500 m
3	2002-03 (South Korea) Chuncheon	1000 m
4	2002-03 (South Korea) Chuncheon	1500 m
5	2002-03 (South Korea) Chuncheon	3000 m S.F.
6	2002-03 (Italy) Bormio	3000 m S.F.
7	2003-04 (United States) Michigan	Overall
8	2003-04 (United States) Michigan	1000 m
9	2003-04 (United States) Michigan	1500 m
10	2003-04 (United States) Michigan	5000 m relay
11	2003-04 (South Korea) Jeonju	1500 m
12	2003-04 (China) Beijing	Overall
13	2003-04 (China) Beijing	1500 m
14	2003-04 (China) Beijing	3000 m S.F.
15	2003-04 (Czech Republic) Mladá Boleslav	Overall
16	2003-04 (Czech Republic) Mladá Boleslav	1500 m
17	2004-05 (China) Harbin	1000 m
18	2004-05 (China) Harbin	3000 m S.F.
19	2004-05 (China) Harbin	5000 m relay
20	2004-05 (China) Beijing	Overall
21	2004-05 (China) Beijing	500 m
22	2004-05 (China) Beijing	1000 m
23	2004-05 (China) Beijing	1500 m
24	2004-05 (China) Beijing	3000 m S.F.
25	2004-05 (China) Beijing	5000 m relay
26	2004-05 (Hungary) Budapest	1500 m
27	2004-05 (Slovakia) Spišská Nová Ves	3000 m S.F.
28	2005–06 (China) Hangzhou	Overall
29	2005–06 (China) Hangzhou	1000 m
30	2005–06 (China) Hangzhou	5000 m relay
31	2005–06 (South Korea) Seoul	1500 m
32	2005–06 (South Korea) Seoul	5000 m relay
33	2005–06 (Italy) Bormio	500 m
34	2005–06 (Italy) Bormio	5000 m relay
35	2005–06 (Netherlands) Hague	Overall
36	2005–06 (Netherlands) Hague	500 m
37	2005–06 (Netherlands) Hague	1500 m
38	2006-07 (China) Changchun	1000 m
39	2006-07 (China) Changchun	1500 m
40	2006-07 (China) Changchun	5000 m relay
41	2006-07 (South Korea) Jeonju	1500 m
42	2006-07 (Canada) Saguenay	1000 m
43	2006-07 (Canada) Saguenay	5000 m relay
44	2006-07 (Canada) Montreal	1500 m (1)
45	2006-07 (Canada) Montreal	5000 m relay
46	2007-08 (China) Harbin	1000 m
47	2007-08 (China) Harbin	1500 m
48	2007-08 (China) Harbin	5000 m relay
49	2007-08 (Japan) Kobe	1000 m
50	2007-08 (Japan) Kobe	1500 m
51	2007-08 (Japan) Kobe	5000 m relay
52	2007-08 (Netherlands) Heerenveen	1000 m
53	2007-08 (Netherlands) Heerenveen	5000 m relay
54	2007-08 (Italy) Turin	1500 m
55	2007-08 (Italy) Turin	5000 m relay
56	2012-13 (Canada) Calgary	1000 m
57	2012-13 (Japan) Nagoya	1000 m
58	2012-13 (China) Shanghai	1500 m
59	2012-13 (Russia) Sochi	5000 m relay
60	2013-14 (South Korea) Seoul	500 m
61	2013-14 (Russia) Kolomna	500 m
62	2014-15 (United States) Salt Lake City	1000 m
63	2014-15 (United States) Salt Lake City	5000 m relay
64	2016-17 (Germany) Dresden	5000 m relay
65	2019-20 (United States) Salt Lake City	2000 m mixed relay
66	2019-20 (United States) Salt Lake City	5000 m relay
67	2019-20 (China) Shanghai	5000 m relay

==== 37 Silver medals ====
Silver medals
No.	Competition Location	Event
1	2002-03 (China) Beijing	1500 m
2	2002-03 (China) Beijing	3000 m S.F.
3	2002-03 (Russia) Saint Petersburg	1500 m
4	2002-03 (Russia) Saint Petersburg	3000 m S.F.
5	2002-03 (Italy) Bormio	Overall
6	2002-03 (Italy) Bormio	1000 m
7	2003-04 (Canada) Calgary	1500 m
8	2003-04 (United States) Michigan	500 m
9	2003-04 (South Korea) Jeonju	3000 m S.F.
10	2003-04 (China) Beijing	1000 m
11	2003-04 (Czech Republic) Mladá Boleslav	1000 m
12	2003-04 (Czech Republic) Mladá Boleslav	3000 m S.F.
13	2004-05 (China) Harbin	Overall
14	2004-05 (China) Harbin	1500 m
15	2004-05 (Slovakia) Spišská Nová Ves	1000 m
16	2004-05 (Slovakia) Spišská Nová Ves	5000 m relay
17	2005–06 (China) Hangzhou	500 m
18	2005–06 (China) Hangzhou	1500 m
19	2005–06 (China) Hangzhou	3000 m S.F.
20	2005–06 (South Korea) Seoul	Overall
21	2005–06 (South Korea) Seoul	3000 m S.F.
22	2005–06 (Netherlands) Hague	5000 m relay
23	2006-07 (Canada) Montreal	1500 m (2)
24	2007-08 (Italy) Turin	1000 m
25	2012-13 (Canada) Calgary	5000 m relay
26	2012-13 (China) Shanghai	1000 m
27	2013-14 (South Korea) Seoul	1000 m
28	2013-14 (Italy) Turin	500 m
29	2013-14 (Italy) Turin	1000 m
30	2013-14 (Italy) Turin	5000 m relay
31	2013-14 (Russia) Kolomna	1500 m
32	2013-14 (Russia) Kolomna	5000 m relay
33	2014-15 (Turkey) Erzurum	1000 m
34	2016-17 (Belarus) Minsk	5000 m relay
35	2019-20 (United States) Salt Lake City	500 m
36	2019-20 (United States) Salt Lake City	1000 m
37	2019-20 (China) Shanghai	2000 m mixed relay

==== 25 Bronze medals ====
Bronze medals
No.	Competition Location	Event
1	2002-03 (Russia) Saint Petersburg	Overall
2	2002-03 (Russia) Saint Petersburg	5000 m relay
3	2003-04 (Canada) Calgary	Overall
4	2003-04 (Canada) Calgary	1000 m
5	2003-04 (Canada) Calgary	3000 m S.F.
6	2003-04 (Canada) Calgary	5000 m relay
7	2003-04 (South Korea) Jeonju	Overall
8	2003-04 (South Korea) Jeonju	5000 m relay
9	2003-04 (China) Beijing	5000 m relay
10	2004-05 (Slovakia) Spišská Nová Ves	Overall
11	2005–06 (South Korea) Seoul	1000 m
12	2005–06 (Italy) Bormio	Overall
13	2005–06 (Italy) Bormio	3000 m S.F
14	2005–06 (Netherlands) Hague	1000 m
15	2006-07 (South Korea) Jeonju	1000 m
16	2006-07 (South Korea) Jeonju	5000 m relay
17	2007-08 (Netherlands) Heerenveen	1500 m
18	2012-13 (Germany) Dresden	1000 m
19	2012-13 (Germany) Dresden	1500 m
20	2012-13 (Germany) Dresden	5000 m relay
21	2013-14 (China) Shanghai	1500 m
22	2013-14 (South Korea) Seoul	1500 m
23	2014-15 (Turkey) Erzurum	1500 m
24	2016-17 (Canada) Calgary	500 m
25	2016-17 (China) Shanghai	500 m

=== National competitions ===
South Korea National Competitions (1996–2011)
Date	Competition	Rank	Event
Myongji Primary School
16 Feb 1996	1996 Korean National Winter Sports Festival	2nd place, silver medalist(s)	1500 m
09~10 Apr 1996	1996 National Student Short Track Championships	1st place, gold medalist(s)	500 m
09~10 Apr 1996	1996 National Student Short Track Championships	1st place, gold medalist(s)	1500 m
09~10 Apr 1996	1996 National Student Short Track Championships	1st place, gold medalist(s)	Overall
03 Feb 1997	1997 Korean National Winter Sports Festival	1st place, gold medalist(s)	1000 m
26 Feb 1998	1998 Korean National Winter Sports Festival	1st place, gold medalist(s)	1500 m
28 Feb 1998	1998 Korean National Winter Sports Festival	1st place, gold medalist(s)	2000 m
Myongji Middle School
12 Feb 1999	1999 Korean National Winter Sports Festival	2nd place, silver medalist(s)	1000 m
12 Feb 1999	1999 Korean National Winter Sports Festival	3rd place, bronze medalist(s)	3000 m
16 Feb 2000	2000 Korean National Winter Sports Festival	1st place, gold medalist(s)	3000 m
22 Feb 2001	2001 Korean National Winter Sports Festival	2nd place, silver medalist(s)	500 m
23 Feb 2001	2001 Korean National Winter Sports Festival	1st place, gold medalist(s)	1000 m
Shinmok High School
18 Apr 2002	2002-03 National Short Track Championships	1st place, gold medalist(s)	1500 m
1 Apr 2003	2003-04 National Short Track Championshipsn	1st place, gold medalist(s)	1500 m
1 Apr 2003	2003-04 National Short Track Championships	2nd place, silver medalist(s)	500 m
2 Apr 2003	2003-04 National Short Track Championships	1st place, gold medalist(s)	3000 m
2 Apr 2003	2003-04 National Short Track Championships	1st place, gold medalist(s)	Overall
Korea National Sports University
9 Sep 2005	2005-06 National Short Track Championships	1st place, gold medalist(s)	1500 m
9 Sep 2005	2005-06 National Short Track Championships	2nd place, silver medalist(s)	500 m
9 Sep 2005	2005-06 National Short Track Championships	2nd place, silver medalist(s)	Overall
15 Apr 2006	2006-07 National Short Track Championships	1st place, gold medalist(s)	1500 m
16 Apr 2006	2006-07 National Short Track Championships	3rd place, bronze medalist(s)	3000 m
16 Apr 2006	2006-07 National Short Track Championships	3rd place, bronze medalist(s)	Overall
27 Sep 2006	2006-07 National Short Track Championships	1st place, gold medalist(s)	1000 m
27 Sep 2006	2006-07 National Short Track Championships	1st place, gold medalist(s)	Overall
5 Jan 2007	2007 Korea Industrial Skating Federation President's Cup	1st place, gold medalist(s)	500 m
6 Jan 2007	2007 Korea Industrial Skating Federation President's Cup	1st place, gold medalist(s)	1000 m
22 Feb 2007	2007 Korean National Winter Sports Festival	1st place, gold medalist(s)	1500 m
22 Feb 2007	2007 Korean National Winter Sports Festival	3rd place, bronze medalist(s)	1000 m
24 Feb 2007	2007 Korean National Winter Sports Festival	1st place, gold medalist(s)	3000 m relay
Seongnam Local Government Team
18 Oct 2009	2009 Korea Industrial Skating Federation President's Cup	1st place, gold medalist(s)	3000 m relay
22 Feb 2010	2010 Korean National Winter Sports Festival	1st place, gold medalist(s)	1500 m
02 Feb 2010	2010 Korean National Winter Sports Festival	1st place, gold medalist(s)	3000 m
02 Feb 2010	2010 Korean National Winter Sports Festival	1st place, gold medalist(s)	5000 m relay
no Team
14 Feb 2011	2011 Korean National Winter Sports Festival	2nd place, silver medalist(s)	1500 m
14 Feb 2011	2011 Korean National Winter Sports Festival	1st place, gold medalist(s)	3000 m
16 Feb 2011	2011 Korean National Winter Sports Festival	2nd place, silver medalist(s)	5000 m relay
25 Mar 2011	2011-12 National Short Track Championships	2nd place, silver medalist(s)	1500 m
26 Mar 2011	2011-12 National Short Track Championships	2nd place, silver medalist(s)	500 m
26 Mar 2011	2011-12 National Short Track Championships	1st place, gold medalist(s)	1000 m
27 Mar 2011	2011-12 National Short Track Championships	3rd place, bronze medalist(s)	3000 m
6 Apr 2011	2011-12 National Short Track Championships	1st place, gold medalist(s)	500 m
Russia National Competitions (2012–2019)
CSKA Moscow
21~23 Mar 2012	2012 National Championships Kolomna	1st place, gold medalist(s)	1000 m
21~23 Mar 2012	2012 National Championships Kolomna	2nd place, silver medalist(s)	1500 m
21~23 Mar 2012	2012 National Championships Kolomna	1st place, gold medalist(s)	3000 m
27~30 Sep 2012	2012 National Championships Novogorsk	2nd place, silver medalist(s)	500 m (1)
27~30 Sep 2012	2012 National Championships Novogorsk	2nd place, silver medalist(s)	500 m (2)
27~30 Sep 2012	2012 National Championships Novogorsk	1st place, gold medalist(s)	1000 m (2)
27~30 Sep 2012	2012 National Championships Novogorsk	1st place, gold medalist(s)	1500 m (1)
27~30 Sep 2012	2012 National Championships Novogorsk	2nd place, silver medalist(s)	1500 m (2)
27~30 Sep 2012	2012 National Championships Novogorsk	1st place, gold medalist(s)	5000 m relay
27~30 Sep 2012	2012 National Championships Novogorsk	2nd place, silver medalist(s)	Overall
19~21 Dec 2012	2012 National Championships Sochi	1st place, gold medalist(s)	1000 m
19~21 Dec 2012	2012 National Championships Sochi	1st place, gold medalist(s)	1500 m
19~21 Dec 2012	2012 National Championships Sochi	1st place, gold medalist(s)	3000 m
19~21 Dec 2012	2012 National Championships Sochi	1st place, gold medalist(s)	Overall
16~18 Oct 2014	2014 National League Russia Cup Kolomna	1st place, gold medalist(s)	500 m (1)
16~18 Oct 2014	2014 National League Russia Cup Kolomna	1st place, gold medalist(s)	500 m (2)
16~18 Oct 2014	2014 National League Russia Cup Kolomna	1st place, gold medalist(s)	1000 m (1)
16~18 Oct 2014	2014 National League Russia Cup Kolomna	2nd place, silver medalist(s)	1000 m (2)
16~18 Oct 2014	2014 National League Russia Cup Kolomna	1st place, gold medalist(s)	1500 m (1)
16~18 Oct 2014	2014 National League Russia Cup Kolomna	3rd place, bronze medalist(s)	1500 m 2)
16~18 Oct 2014	2014 National League Russia Cup Kolomna	1st place, gold medalist(s)	Overall
27~29 Dec 2014	2014 National Championships Kolomna	1st place, gold medalist(s)	1000 m
27~29 Dec 2014	2014 National Championships Kolomna	1st place, gold medalist(s)	1500 m
27~29 Dec 2014	2014 National Championships Kolomna	1st place, gold medalist(s)	3000 m
27~29 Dec 2014	2014 National Championships Kolomna	1st place, gold medalist(s)	5000 m relay
27~29 Dec 2014	2014 National Championships Kolomna	1st place, gold medalist(s)	Overall
09~11 Sep 2016	2016 National Championships Moscow	3rd place, bronze medalist(s)	1500 m
09~11 Sep 2016	2016 National Championships Moscow	1st place, gold medalist(s)	500 m
23~25 Sep 2016	2016 National League Russia Cup Kolomna	1st place, gold medalist(s)	500 m (1)
23~25 Sep 2016	2016 National League Russia Cup Kolomna	2nd place, silver medalist(s)	500 m (2)
23~25 Sep 2016	2016 National League Russia Cup Kolomna	1st place, gold medalist(s)	1500 m (1)
23~25 Sep 2016	2016 National League Russia Cup Kolomna	1st place, gold medalist(s)	1500 m (2)
23~25 Sep 2016	2016 National League Russia Cup Kolomna	1st place, gold medalist(s)	1000 m (1)
23~25 Sep 2016	2016 National League Russia Cup Kolomna	1st place, gold medalist(s)	1000 m (2)
23~25 Sep 2016	2016 National League Russia Cup Kolomna	1st place, gold medalist(s)	Overall
27~29 Dec 2016	2016 National Championships Novogorsk	1st place, gold medalist(s)	500 m
27~29 Dec 2016	2016 National Championships Novogorsk	1st place, gold medalist(s)	1000 m
27~29 Dec 2016	2016 National Championships Novogorsk	1st place, gold medalist(s)	1500 m
27~29 Dec 2016	2016 National Championships Novogorsk	1st place, gold medalist(s)	Overall
11~13 Aug 2017	2017 National League Russia Cup Novogorsk	1st place, gold medalist(s)	500 m (1)
11~13 Aug 2017	2017 National League Russia Cup Novogorsk	1st place, gold medalist(s)	500 m (2)
11~13 Aug 2017	2017 National League Russia Cup Novogorsk	2nd place, silver medalist(s)	1000 m (1)
11~13 Aug 2017	2017 National League Russia Cup Novogorsk	2nd place, silver medalist(s)	1500 m (1)
11~13 Aug 2017	2017 National League Russia Cup Novogorsk	1st place, gold medalist(s)	1500 m (2)
11~13 Aug 2017	2017 National League Russia Cup Novogorsk	2nd place, silver medalist(s)	Overall
31 Mar~1 Apr 2018	2018 Russian Championships Saint Petersburg	1st place, gold medalist(s)	500 m
31 Mar~1 Apr 2018	2018 Russian Championships Saint Petersburg	2nd place, silver medalist(s)	1000 m
31 Mar~1 Apr 2018	2018 Russian Championships Saint Petersburg	2nd place, silver medalist(s)	1500 m
31 Mar~1 Apr 2018	2018 Russian Championships Saint Petersburg	1st place, gold medalist(s)	5000 m relay
27~29 Sep 2019	2019 National League Russia Cup Kolomna	2nd place, silver medalist(s)	1000 m (1)
27~29 Sep 2019	2019 National League Russia Cup Kolomna	1st place, gold medalist(s)	1000 m (2)
27~29 Sep 2019	2019 National League Russia Cup Kolomna	3rd place, bronze medalist(s)	1500 m
27~29 Sep 2019	2019 National League Russia Cup Kolomna	2nd place, silver medalist(s)	Overall
