= 2005 World Short Track Speed Skating Championships =

The 2005 World Short Track Speed Skating Championships took place between 9 and 11 March 2005 in Beijing, China. The World Championships are organised by the ISU which also run world cups and championships in speed skating and figure skating.

== Results ==
=== Men ===
Event	Gold		Silver		Bronze	
Overall*	Ahn Hyun-soo; South Korea	89 points	Apolo Anton Ohno; United States	68 points	François-Louis Tremblay; Canada	60 points
500 m	François-Louis Tremblay; Canada	42.106	Charles Hamelin; Canada	42.135	Ahn Hyun-soo; South Korea	42.185
1000 m	Apolo Anton Ohno; United States	1:30.066	Ahn Hyun-soo; South Korea	1:30.206	Li Jiajun; China	1:30.641
1500 m	Ahn Hyun-soo; South Korea	2:14.396	François-Louis Tremblay; Canada	2:14.992	Lee Seung-hoon; South Korea	2:15.244
5000 m relay	Canada; Charles Hamelin; Steve Robillard; François-Louis Tremblay; Mathieu Turcotte	6:39.990	South Korea; Ahn Hyun-soo; Lee Seung-hoon; Seo Ho-jin; Song Kyung-taek; Lee Jae-kyung	6:40.020	United States; Shani Davis; Alex Izykowski; Jordan Malone; Apolo Anton Ohno	6:52.072

* First place is awarded 34 points, second is awarded 21 points, third is awarded 13 points, fourth is awarded 8 points, fifth is awarded 5 points, sixth is awarded 3 points, seventh is awarded 2 points, and eighth is awarded 1 point in the finals of each individual race to determine the overall world champion. The relays do not count for the overall classification.

=== Women ===
Event	Gold		Silver		Bronze	
Overall*	Jin Sun-yu; South Korea	76 points	Choi Eun-kyung; South Korea	63 points	Kang Yun-mi; South Korea	60 points
500 m	Yang Yang; China	45.038	Wang Meng; China	45.129	Fu Tianyu; China	45.232
1000 m	Choi Eun-kyung; South Korea	1:31.085	Jin Sun-yu; South Korea	1:31.232	Wang Meng; China	1:31.343
1500 m	Jin Sun-yu; South Korea	2:20.461	Kang Yun-mi; South Korea	2:20.743	Wang Meng; China	2:20.876
3000 m relay^{†}	Canada; Alanna Kraus; Chantale Sévigny; Kalyna Roberge; Tania Vicent; Amanda Overland	4:20.767	China; Cheng Xiaolei; Fu Tianyu; Wang Meng; Yang Yang	4:30.654	France; Stéphanie Bouvier; Choi Min-kyung; Myrtille Gollin; Celine Lecompere	4:24.974

^{†} In the final of the Women's 3000 m relay, the South Korean and Japanese teams were disqualified, thus the French team was awarded the bronze medal from its time in the heats.

* First place is awarded 34 points, second is awarded 21 points, third is awarded 13 points, fourth is awarded 8 points, fifth is awarded 5 points, sixth is awarded 3 points, seventh is awarded 2 points, and eighth is awarded 1 point in the finals of each individual race to determine the overall world champion. The relays do not count for the overall classification.

== Medal table ==
* Host nation (China)

Rank	Nation	Gold	Silver	Bronze	Total
1	South Korea	5	5	3	13
2	Canada	3	2	1	6
3	China*	1	2	4	7
4	United States	1	1	1	3
5	France	0	0	1	1
Totals (5 entries)		10	10	10	30
