= Novogorsk =

Coordinates: 55°53′57″N 37°20′56″E

Novogorsk (Russian: Новогорск) is a microdistrict within the city of Khimki, Moscow Oblast. Until 2004, it was a settlement within the Khimki area.

According to the 2002 census, the population of the village was 2,764 people. The residential complex "Olympic Village Novogorsk" is located in the microdistrict. as well as the Civil Defense Academy of the Ministry of Emergency Situations.
