= Korea National Sport University =

University in Seoul, South Korea

- 한국체육대학교
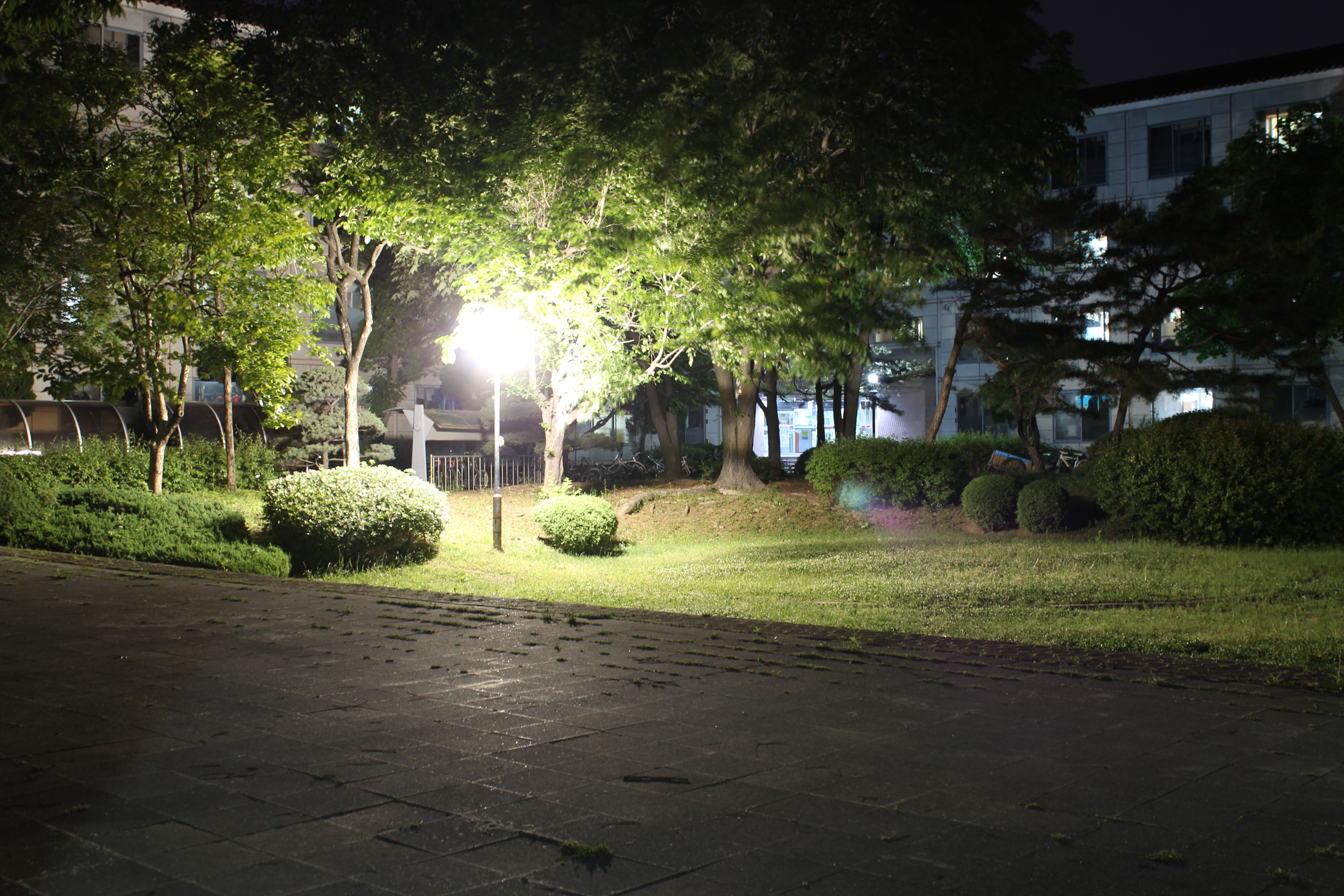
- Type: National university
- Established: December 1977; 48 years ago
- President: Moon Won-jae (문원재)
- Location: Seoul, South Korea
- Campus: Urban
- Website: knsu.ac.kr

Korean name
- Hangul: 한국체육대학교
- Hanja: 韓國體育大學校
- RR: Hanguk cheyuk daehakgyo
- MR: Han'guk ch'eyuk taehakkyo

Korea National Sport University (KNSU) is a South Korean national university located in the neighborhood of Bangi-dong, Songpa-gu, Seoul. It is the only national sport university of South Korea and offers degrees from undergraduate to doctoral level. Its broad range of course offerings caters to amateur athletes, professional athletes representing the national team and accredited physical education teachers.

== History ==
The success of wrestler Yang Jung-mo at the 1976 Summer Olympics prompted the South Korean government to consider opening a government-funded sports school. At that time, sports was still semi-professional and had little oversight by any centralized governing body while student athletics were primarily dominated by Korea University and Yonsei University, both of which are private universities. In December 1977, the South Korean government announced plans to open the Korean National College of Physical Education under the Presidential Decree (No. 8322). Rather than begin as a 2-year junior college and gradually expand, as was the case with many universities, the college was founded as a 4-year degree-granting institution.

Its first students were admitted the following March for the 1978–79 academic year. The campus was then located in Nowon-gu on the outskirts of Seoul and only offered a major in physical education. The 1980s to 1990s saw rapid expansion in its course offerings as coaching, community sports, sports and leisure studies, health management, sports safety management, taekwondo and sports media were added. Graduate programs and evening classes for working students were added. The lack of space in Nowon-gu and construction of facilities for the 1988 Summer Olympics in Songpa-gu led to the decision to relocate the college to its present-day campus. It gained university status in 1993. The evening classes for working students were phased out by the 2000s in favor of other options, such as online learning, short certificate courses and part-time studies.

== Academics ==
The university is organized into two colleges and a division. Its graduate school is organized into three interdisciplinary schools which only oversee master's and doctorate degree programs.

- College of Sports Science
  - Department of Physical Education
- College of Lifetime Sport
  - Department of Community Sport
  - Department of Youth Guidance and Sports Education
  - Department of Dance
  - Department of Adapted Physical Education
  - Department of Taekwondo
  - Department of Sports and Leisure Studies
  - Department of Health and Exercise Science
  - Department of Sport and Healthy Aging
- Division of Liberal Arts and Science

== Research ==
Since 2019, KNSU has been a partner institution of Yonsei Institute of Sports Science & Exercise Medicine (YISSEM). The research institute specializes in sports medicine, pooling its resources from the well-established physical education programs of both universities and Yonsei's College of Medicine and Severance Hospital system. YISSEM was chosen by the International Olympic Committee as a partner research center specializing in athlete health and injury prevention.

== Admissions ==
As a designated national university, tuition fees are low for domestic students. Due to the stipulations of its founding decree, undergraduate students majoring in physical education and sports guidance have different criteria from other national universities and receive a full tuition waiver and fully-subsidized room and board, with the requirement that they reside in the dormitories throughout the duration of their studies.

== Notable alumni ==
- Viktor An, short-track speed skater and coach, former world record holder in the 3000m event and six-time Olympic champion and multiple-times medalist at the Olympics and World Championships
- Lee Sang-hwa, speed skater two-time Olympic champion
- Go Woo-ri, singer (Rainbow)
- Im Sung-jae, professional golfer, 2018–19 PGA Tour Rookie of the Year
- Kim Jung-hwan, sabre fencer and three-time Olympic medalist
- Soo Yeon Lee, table tennis player, coach, and model
- Lim Hyo-jun, short-track gold medalist at the 2018 Pyeongchang Olympics
- Park Sang-young, épée gold medalist at the 2016 Rio de Janeiro Olympics
- Shim Suk-hee, short-track gold medalist at the 2018 Pyeongchang Olympics
- Won Jeong-sik, weightlifting gold medalist at the 2017 World Weightlifting Championships
- Won Woo-young, sabre fencer and Olympic gold medalist
- Yang Hak-seon, former gymnast and gold medalist in the vault at the Olympics and World Championships
- Yun Sung-bin, skeleton gold medalist at the 2018 Pyeongchang Olympics
- Lim Si-hyeon, archery gold medalist at the 2024 Paris Olympics
- Im Ae-ji, amateur boxer bronze medalist at the 2024 Paris Olympics

== See also ==
- Beijing Sport University
- Korea Armed Forces Athletic Corps
- Korea National Training Center
- Korea Sports Council
- List of national universities in South Korea
- List of universities and colleges in South Korea
- Education in Korea
