= Korean National Sports Festival =

Annual sports festival in South Korea

- Hangul: 전국체육대회
- Hanja: 全國體育大會
- RR: Jeonguk cheyuk daehoe
- MR: Chŏn'guk ch'eyuk taehoe

The Korean National Sports Festival is an annual sports competition held in South Korea.

For a full week each October, about 20,000 athletes representing 16 cities and provinces throughout the country compete in about 40 separate sports. The site rotates among the major cities, including Seoul, Busan, Daegu, Gwangju and Incheon. The 2005 festival was held in Ulsan and the 2009 festival in Daejeon.

Competitions are held in High School, College, and Regular Divisions.

== History ==
The current annual numbering originates from the 1920 All-Korea Baseball Series and the formation of the Korean Sports Festival (조선체육회). The Japanese colonial government held a multi-sport competition in 1925, but the Korean Sports Festival first became a national multi-sport competition in 1934, with baseball, soccer, tennis, track and field, and basketball.

In 1938, the Korean Sports Festival was forcibly dissolved by the colonial government. The festival, numbered 26th, resumed upon the 1945 liberation of Korea. With the establishment of South Korea in 1948, the event was renamed the "National Sports Festival," and individual competition was changed to competition among cities and provinces. The festival was cancelled in 1951, during the Korean War.

== List of Korean National Sports Festivals ==
Games	Year	Host	Dates	Competitors			Sports	Events	Ref
Games	Year	Host	Dates	Total	Men	Women	Sports	Events	Ref
1	1920	No Fixed Venue					1	1	
2	1921	No Fixed Venue							
3	1922	No Fixed Venue							
4	1923	No Fixed Venue							
5	1924	No Fixed Venue							
6	1925	No Fixed Venue							
7	1926	No Fixed Venue							
8	1927	No Fixed Venue							
9	1928	No Fixed Venue							
10	1929	No Fixed Venue							
11	1930	No Fixed Venue							
12	1931	No Fixed Venue							
13	1932	No Fixed Venue							
14	1933	No Fixed Venue							
15	1934	Gyeongseong	November 2–5						
16	1935	Gyeongseong	October 22–26						
17	1936	Gyeongseong	September						
18	1937	Gyeongseong	September						
19-25	1938–1944	Discontinued							
26	1945	Seoul	October 27–30						
27	1946	Seoul	October 16–20						
28	1947	Seoul	October 13–19						
29	1948	Seoul	October 20–26						
30	1949	Seoul	October 15–23						
31	1950	Not held due to Korean War							
32	1951	Gwangju	October 27–31						
33	1952	Seoul	October 18–24						
34	1953	Seoul	October 17–22						
35	1954	Seoul	October 19–25						
36	1955	Seoul	October 15–22						
37	1956	Seoul	October 3–9						
38	1957	Busan	October 18–24						
39	1958	Seoul	October 3–9						
40	1959	Seoul	October 3–9						
41	1960	Daejeon	October 10–16						
42	1961	Seoul	October 11–15						
43	1962	Daegu	October 24–29						
44	1963	Jeonju	October 4–9						
45	1964	Gyeonggi	September 3–8						
46	1965	Gwangju	October 5–10						
47	1966	Seoul	October 10–15						
48	1967	Seoul	October 5–10						
49	1968	Seoul	September 12–17						
50	1969	Seoul	October 28-November 2						
51	1970	Seoul	October 6–11						
52	1971	Seoul	October 8–13						
53	1972	Seoul	October 6–11						
54	1973	Busan	October 12–17						
55	1974	Seoul	October 8–13						
56	1975	Daegu	October 7–12						
57	1976	Busan	October 12–17						
58	1977	Gwangju	October 10–15						
59	1978	Incheon	October 12–17						
60	1979	Chungnam	October 12–17						
61	1980	Jeonbuk	October 8–13						
62	1981	Seoul	October 10–15						
63	1982	Gyeongnam	October 14–19						
64	1983	Incheon	October 6–11						
65	1984	Daegu	October 11–16						
66	1985	Gangwon	October 10–15						
67	1986	Seoul, Gyeonggi, Busan	June 20–25						
68	1987	Gwangju	October 13–18						
69	1988	No Fixed Venue	May 9–22						
70	1989	Gyeonggi	September 26-October 1						
71	1990	Chungbuk	October 15–21						
72	1991	Jeonbuk	October 7–13						
73	1992	Daegu	October 10–16						
74	1993	Gwangju	October 11–17						
75	1994	Daejeon	October 27-November 2						
76	1995	Gyeongbuk	October 2–8						
77	1996	Gangwon	October 7–13						
78	1997	Gyeongnam	October 8–14						
79	1998	Jeju	September 25-October 1						
80	1999	Incheon	October 11–17						
81	2000	Busan	October 12–18						
82	2001	Chungnam	October 10–16						
83	2002	Jeju	November 9–15						
84	2003	Jeonbuk	October 10–16						
85	2004	Chungbuk	October 8–14						
86	2005	Ulsan	October 14–20						
87	2006	Gyeongbuk	October 17–23						
88	2007	Gwangju	October 8–14						
89	2008	Jeonnam	October 10–16						
90	2009	Daejeon	October 20–26						
91	2010	Gyeongnam	October 6–12						
92	2011	Gyeonggi	October 6–12						
93	2012	Daegu	October 11–17						
94	2013	Incheon	October 18–24						
95	2014	Jeju	October 28-November 3						
96	2015	Gangwon	October 16–22						
97	2016	Chungnam	October 7–13						
98	2017	Chungbuk	October 20–26						
99	2018	Jeonbuk	October 12–18						
100	2019	Seoul	October 4–10						
101	2020	Gyeongbuk	Not held due to COVID-19 pandemic						
102	2021	Gyeongbuk	October 8–14						
103	2022	Ulsan	October 7–13						
104	2023	Jeonnam	October 13–19						
105	2024	Gyeongnam	October 11-17						
106	2025	Busan	October 17-23						

== Other national sports events ==
Related annual national sports events include:

- The National Winter Sports Festival
- The Children's National Sports Festival
- The National Sports Festival for the Handicapped
