= Seo Ho-jin =

Short track speed skater

Medal record

Men's short track speed skating

Representing South Korea

Olympic Games
Gold medal – first place	2006 Turin	5000 m relay

World Championships
Silver medal – second place	2005 Beijing	5000 m relay

World Team Championships
Gold medal – first place	2004 Beijing	Team
Gold medal – first place	2006 Montreal	Team
Silver medal – second place	2005 St. Petersburg	Team

World Junior Championships
Gold medal – first place	2002 Chuncheon	1500 m S.F.
Gold medal – first place	2002 Chuncheon	2000 m relay
Silver medal – second place	2002 Chuncheon	Overall
Bronze medal – third place	2002 Chuncheon	1000 m
Bronze medal – third place	2002 Chuncheon	1500 m

Seo Ho-Jin (Korean: 서호진; Hanja: 徐昊辰; born June 11, 1983) is a former South Korean short track speed skater who won gold in the 5000m relay at the 2006 Winter Olympics in Turin. He allegedly assaulted compatriot Viktor An during the 2005 Winter Universides, causing him to be banished from the national team. However, this was reinstated.
