= Short-track speed skating at the 2006 Winter Olympics =

Speed skating at the XX Olympic Winter Games
- Venue: Torino Palavela
- Dates: 12–25 February 2006
- No. of events: 8
- Competitors: 106 from 24 nations

Short track speed skating at the 2006 Winter Olympics was held over thirteen days, from 12 to 25 February. Eight events were contested at the Torino Palavela. In the men's competition, Ahn Hyun-soo earned a medal in each event, winning three golds. On the women's side, Jin Sun-yu scored three gold medals.

== Medal summary ==
=== Medal table ===
Rank	Nation	Gold	Silver	Bronze	Total
1	South Korea	6	3	1	10
2	China	1	1	3	5
3	United States	1	0	2	3
4	Canada	0	3	1	4
5	Bulgaria	0	1	0	1
6	Italy	0	0	1	1
Totals (6 entries)		8	8	8	24

=== Men's events ===
Event	Gold		Silver		Bronze	
500 metres	Apolo Anton Ohno; United States	41.935	François-Louis Tremblay; Canada	42.002	Ahn Hyun-soo; South Korea	42.089
1000 metres	Ahn Hyun-soo; South Korea	1:26.739	Lee Ho-suk; South Korea	1:26.764	Apolo Anton Ohno; United States	1:26.927
1500 metres	Ahn Hyun-soo; South Korea	2:25.341	Lee Ho-suk; South Korea	2:25.600	Li Jiajun; China	2:26.005
5000 metre relay	South Korea; Ahn Hyun-soo; Lee Ho-suk; Oh Se-jong*; Seo Ho-jin; Song Suk-woo	6:43.376	Canada; Eric Bédard; Jonathan Guilmette*; Charles Hamelin; François-Louis Tremblay; Mathieu Turcotte	6:43.707	United States; Alex Izykowski; J. P. Kepka; Apolo Anton Ohno; Rusty Smith	6:47.990

* Skaters who did not participate in the final, but received medals.

=== Women's events ===
Event	Gold		Silver		Bronze	
500 metres	Wang Meng; China	44.345	Evgenia Radanova; Bulgaria	44.374	Anouk Leblanc-Boucher; Canada	44.759
1000 metres	Jin Sun-yu; South Korea	1:32.859	Wang Meng; China	1:33.079	Yang Yang (A); China	1:33.937
1500 metres	Jin Sun-yu; South Korea	2:23.494	Choi Eun-kyung; South Korea	2:24.069	Wang Meng; China	2:24.469
3000 metre relay	South Korea; Byun Chun-sa; Choi Eun-kyung; Jeon Da-hye; Jin Sun-yu; Kang Yun-mi*	4:17.040	Canada; Alanna Kraus; Anouk Leblanc-Boucher; Amanda Overland*; Kalyna Roberge; Tania Vicent	4:17.336	Italy; Arianna Fontana; Marta Capurso; Katia Zini; Mara Zini	4:20.030

* Skaters who did not participate in the final, but received medals.

== Records ==
Of the four Olympic records set in Turin, three of them came in the men's 1000 metres.

Event	Date	Round	Team	Time	OR	WR
Men's 1000 metres	15 February	Heat 1	Li Ye (CHN)	1:27.048	OR	
Men's 1000 metres	18 February	Quarterfinal 1	Rusty Smith (USA)	1:27.000	OR	
Men's 1000 metres	18 February	Final A	Ahn Hyun-soo (KOR)	1:26.739	OR	
Men's 5000 metre relay	25 February	Final	South Korea; Ahn Hyun-soo; Lee Ho-suk; Seo Ho-jin; Song Suk-woo	6:43.376	OR	

== Participating NOCs ==
Twenty-four nations competed in the short track at Torino.

- Australia (6)
- Belarus (1)
- Belgium (2)
- Bulgaria (1)
- Canada (10)
- China (8)
- Czech Republic (1)
- France (6)
- Germany (4)
- Great Britain (10)
- Hong Kong (1)
- Hungary (4)
- Italy (9)
- Japan (10)
- South Korea (10)
- Latvia (1)
- Netherlands (3)
- Poland (1)
- North Korea (2)
- Romania (1)
- Russia (3)
- Slovakia (1)
- Ukraine (1)
- United States (10)
