= Kang Yun-mi (speed skater) =

South Korean skater (born 1988)

Kang Yun-Mi
Personal information
- Born: February 10, 1988 (age 38)
Medal record
Women's short track speed skating
Representing South Korea
Olympic Games
Gold medal – first place	2006 Turin	3000 m relay
World Championships
Gold medal – first place	2005 Beijing	3000 m
Gold medal – first place	2005 Chuncheon	Team
Gold medal – first place	2006 Montreal	Team
Silver medal – second place	2005 Beijing	1500 m
Bronze medal – third place	2005 Beijing	Overall
Winter Universiade
Gold medal – first place	2007 Turin	3000 m
World Junior Championships
Gold medal – first place	2003 Budapest	1500 m S-final
Gold medal – first place	2003 Budapest	2000 m relay
Gold medal – first place	2004 Beijing	Overall
Gold medal – first place	2004 Beijing	1000 m
Gold medal – first place	2004 Beijing	2000 m relay
Silver medal – second place	2003 Budapest	Overall
Silver medal – second place	2003 Budapest	1500 m
Silver medal – second place	2004 Beijing	1500 m
Bronze medal – third place	2004 Beijing	500 m

Kang Yun-Mi (Korean: 강윤미; Hanja: 姜允美, born February 10, 1988) is a South Korean short track speed skater who won gold in the 3000m relay at the 2006 Winter Olympics.

Personal records
Women's short track speed skating
Event	Result	Date	Location	Notes
500 m	44:685	2006-03-25	Montreal	
1000 m	1:32.272	2005-10-02	Hangzhou	
1500 m	2:20.455	2004-10-29	Beijing	
