= Jin Sun-yu =

South Korean speed skater (born 1988)

Jin Sun-Yu (진선유)
Personal information
- Born: December 17, 1988 (age 37) Daegu, South Korea
- Height: 164 cm (5 ft 5 in)
- Weight: 54 kg (119 lb)

Sport
- Country: South Korea
- Sport: Short track speed skating
- World Cup wins: 2008 Overall; 2006 Overall
- World championship wins: 2007 Overall; 2006 Overall; 2005 Overall

Achievements and titles
- Personal bests: 500 m: 44.420(2006); 1000 m: 1:30.037(2005, Former WR); 1500 m: 2:20.411(2005); 3000 m: 5:04.798(2004)
Medal record
Women's short track speed skating
Representing South Korea
Event	1st	2nd	3rd
Olympic Games	3	0	0
World Championships	10	3	1
World Team Championships	3	0	0
Olympic Games
Gold medal – first place	2006 Turin	1000 m
Gold medal – first place	2006 Turin	1500 m
Gold medal – first place	2006 Turin	3000 m relay
World Championships
Gold medal – first place	2005 Beijing	Overall
Gold medal – first place	2005 Beijing	1500 m
Gold medal – first place	2006 Minneapolis	Overall
Gold medal – first place	2006 Minneapolis	1000 m
Gold medal – first place	2006 Minneapolis	1500 m
Gold medal – first place	2006 Minneapolis	3000 m
Gold medal – first place	2007 Milan	Overall
Gold medal – first place	2007 Milan	1000 m
Gold medal – first place	2007 Milan	3000 m
Gold medal – first place	2007 Milan	3000 m relay
Silver medal – second place	2005 Beijing	1000 m
Silver medal – second place	2005 Beijing	3000 m
Silver medal – second place	2007 Milan	1500 m
Bronze medal – third place	2005 Beijing	3000 m relay
World Team Championships
Gold medal – first place	2005 Chuncheon	Team
Gold medal – first place	2006 Montréal	Team
Gold medal – first place	2007 Budapest	Team

Jin Sun-Yu (Korean: 진선유; Hanja: 陳善有, born December 17, 1988, in Daegu, South Korea) is a South Korean short-track speed skater. She is a triple Olympic Champion from 2006 and a three-time Overall World Champion (for 2005–2007).

She was the winner of the gold medal in the 1500 meters and the silver medal in the 1000 meters at the 2005 World Championships, as she ended up as the overall champion. At the 2006 World Championships, Jin won the 1000, 1500, and 3000 meters on her way to a second consecutive overall championship. She also finished first in the overall World Cup standings for the 2005–2006 season.

At the 2006 Winter Olympics, she won three gold medals, winning women's individual 1000 meters, and 1500 meters events, and as a member of the South Korean women's victorious 3000 meter relay team. In doing so, Jin became the first athlete (by less than half an hour) from Korea to win three gold medals in one Olympics. Ahn Hyun-Soo matched Jin's achievement later by helping Korea to win men's 5000 meters relay.

== See also ==
- South Korea at the 2006 Winter Olympics
