= List of Asian Games medalists in short-track speed skating =

This is the complete list of Asian Winter Games medalists in short-track speed skating from 1986 to 2025.

== Men ==
=== 500 m ===
Games	Gold	Silver	Bronze
1986 Sapporo	Kenichi Sugio (JPN)	Toshinobu Kawai (JPN)	Kim Chang-hwan (PRK)
1990 Sapporo	Wang Qiang (CHN)	Kim Ki-hoon (KOR)	Wang Quanjun (CHN)
1996 Harbin	Li Jiajun (CHN)	Kim Dong-sung (KOR)	Zhang Hongbo (CHN)
1999 Gangwon	Lee Jun-hwan (KOR)	Feng Kai (CHN)	Satoru Terao (JPN)
2003 Aomori	Li Jiajun (CHN)	Takafumi Nishitani (JPN)	Song Suk-woo (KOR)
2007 Changchun	Hu Ze (CHN)	Song Kyung-taek (KOR)	Li Ye (CHN)
2011 Astana–Almaty	Liang Wenhao (CHN)	Takahiro Fujimoto (JPN)	Ryosuke Sakazume (JPN)
2017 Sapporo	Wu Dajing (CHN)	Seo Yi-ra (KOR)	Park Se-yeong (KOR)
2025 Harbin	Lin Xiaojun (CHN)	Park Ji-won (KOR)	Jang Sung-woo (KOR)

=== 1000 m ===
Games	Gold	Silver	Bronze
1986 Sapporo	Yuichi Akasaka (JPN)	Tatsuyoshi Ishihara (JPN)	Kim Chang-hwan (PRK)
1990 Sapporo	Kim Ki-hoon (KOR)	Ri Won-ho (PRK)	Kwon Young-chul (KOR)
1996 Harbin	Chae Ji-hoon (KOR)	Song Jae-kun (KOR)	Kim Dong-sung (KOR)
1999 Gangwon	Feng Kai (CHN)	Kim Dong-sung (KOR)	Hideto Imai (JPN)
2003 Aomori	Ahn Hyun-soo (KOR)	Li Ye (CHN)	Satoru Terao (JPN)
2007 Changchun	Ahn Hyun-soo (KOR)	Kim Hyun-kon (KOR)	Sui Baoku (CHN)
2011 Astana–Almaty	Song Weilong (CHN)	Daisuke Uemura (JPN)	Sung Si-bak (KOR)
2017 Sapporo	Seo Yi-ra (KOR)	Sin Da-woon (KOR)	Keita Watanabe (JPN)
2025 Harbin	Jang Sung-woo (KOR)	Park Ji-won (KOR)	Liu Shaoang (CHN)

=== 1500 m ===
Games	Gold	Silver	Bronze
1986 Sapporo	Toshinobu Kawai (JPN)	Tatsuyoshi Ishihara (JPN)	Kim Ki-hoon (KOR)
1990 Sapporo	Kim Ki-hoon (KOR)	Lee Joon-ho (KOR)	Kenichi Sugio (JPN)
1996 Harbin	Li Jiajun (CHN)	Chae Ji-hoon (KOR)	Lee Jun-hwan (KOR)
1999 Gangwon	Kim Dong-sung (KOR)	Feng Kai (CHN)	Lee Jun-hwan (KOR)
2003 Aomori	Ahn Hyun-soo (KOR)	Li Jiajun (CHN)	Lee Seung-jae (KOR)
2007 Changchun	Sui Baoku (CHN)	Ahn Hyun-soo (KOR)	Li Ye (CHN)
2011 Astana–Almaty	Noh Jin-kyu (KOR)	Um Cheon-ho (KOR)	Liu Xianwei (CHN)
2017 Sapporo	Park Se-yeong (KOR)	Wu Dajing (CHN)	Lee Jung-su (KOR)
2025 Harbin	Park Ji-won (KOR)	Lin Xiaojun (CHN)	Jang Sung-woo (KOR)

=== 3000 m ===
Games	Gold	Silver	Bronze
1986 Sapporo	Yuichi Akasaka (JPN)	Tatsuyoshi Ishihara (JPN)	Na Un-seop (KOR)
1990 Sapporo	Shuji Kawai (JPN)	Lee Joon-ho (KOR)	Jun Uematsu (JPN)
1996 Harbin	Chae Ji-hoon (KOR)	Kim Dong-sung (KOR)	Song Jae-kun (KOR)
1999 Gangwon	Kim Dong-sung (KOR)	Lee Jun-hwan (KOR)	Yuan Ye (CHN)
2003 Aomori	Song Suk-woo (KOR)	Lee Seung-jae (KOR)	Li Jiajun (CHN)

=== 5000 m relay ===
Games	Gold	Silver	Bronze
1990 Sapporo	South Korea (KOR); Kim Ki-hoon; Kwon Young-chul; Lee Joon-ho; Mo Ji-soo	Japan (JPN)	China (CHN)
1996 Harbin	South Korea (KOR); Chae Ji-hoon; Kim Dong-sung; Kim Sun-tae; Lee Jun-hwan	Japan (JPN); Hideto Imai; Takehiro Kodera; Satoru Terao; Hideharu Yokoyama	China (CHN); Feng Kai; Li Jiajun; Ma Yanjun; Zhang Hongbo
1999 Gangwon	China (CHN); Li Jiajun; Feng Kai; An Yulong; Yuan Ye	Japan (JPN); Takehiro Kodera; Satoru Terao; Hideto Imai; Hitoshi Uematsu	South Korea (KOR); Kim Dong-sung; Lee Jun-hwan; Lee Ho-eung; Kim Sun-tae
2003 Aomori	South Korea (KOR); Lee Seung-jae; Oh Se-jong; Yeo Jun-hyung; Ahn Hyun-soo; Song Suk-woo	China (CHN); Li Ye; Guo Wei; Liu Yingbao; Li Jiajun; Li Haonan	Japan (JPN); Takafumi Nishitani; Satoru Terao; Yoshiharu Arino; Hayato Sueyoshi; Tomonori Ike
2007 Changchun	South Korea (KOR); Song Kyung-taek; Kim Hyun-kon; Ahn Hyun-soo; Lee Ho-suk; Kim Byeong-jun	China (CHN); Li Ye; Sui Baoku; Liu Xiaoliang; Hu Ze; Wang Hongyang	Japan (JPN); Junji Ito; Satoru Terao; Shinichi Tagami; Satoshi Sakashita
2011 Astana–Almaty	South Korea (KOR); Lee Ho-suk; Noh Jin-kyu; Sung Si-bak; Kim Byeong-jun; Um Cheon-ho	Japan (JPN); Yuzo Takamido; Daisuke Uemura; Ryosuke Sakazume; Takahiro Fujimoto	Kazakhstan (KAZ); Aidar Bekzhanov; Artur Sultangaliyev; Nurbergen Zhumagaziyev; Abzal Azhgaliyev; Fedor Andreyev
2017 Sapporo	China (CHN); Wu Dajing; Han Tianyu; Ren Ziwei; Xu Hongzhi; Shi Jingnan	South Korea (KOR); Lee Jung-su; Seo Yi-ra; Sin Da-woon; Park Se-yeong; Han Seung-soo	Japan (JPN); Hiroki Yokoyama; Kazuki Yoshinaga; Keita Watanabe; Ryosuke Sakazume; Takayuki Muratake
2025 Harbin	Kazakhstan (KAZ); Gleb Ivchenko; Denis Nikisha; Mersaid Zhaxybayev; Adil Galiakhmetov; Aibek Nassen; Abzal Azhgaliyev	Japan (JPN); Shun Saito; Daito Ochi; Shuta Matsuzu; Tsubasa Furukawa; Osuke Irie; Kota Kikuchi	China (CHN); Liu Shaoang; Lin Xiaojun; Sun Long; Liu Shaolin; Zhu Yiding; Li Wenlong

== Women ==
=== 500 m ===
Games	Gold	Silver	Bronze
1986 Sapporo	Eiko Shishii (JPN)	Yumiko Yamada (JPN)	Lim Hyon-sook (KOR)
1990 Sapporo	Wang Xiulan (CHN)	Zhang Yanmei (CHN)	Zheng Chunyang (CHN)
1996 Harbin	Wang Chunlu (CHN)	Sun Dandan (CHN)	Yang Yang (CHN)
1999 Gangwon	Yang Yang (CHN)	Choi Min-kyung (KOR)	Sun Dandan (CHN)
2003 Aomori	Yang Yang (CHN)	Wang Meng (CHN)	Ri Hyang-mi (PRK)
2007 Changchun	Wang Meng (CHN)	Fu Tianyu (CHN)	Zhu Mile (CHN)
2007 Changchun	Wang Meng (CHN)	Fu Tianyu (CHN)	Byun Chun-sa (KOR)
2011 Astana–Almaty	Liu Qiuhong (CHN)	Fan Kexin (CHN)	Yui Sakai (JPN)
2017 Sapporo	Zang Yize (CHN)	Ayuko Ito (JPN)	Choi Min-jeong (KOR)
2025 Harbin	Choi Min-jeong (KOR)	Kim Gil-li (KOR)	Lee So-yeon (KOR)

=== 1000 m ===
Games	Gold	Silver	Bronze
1986 Sapporo	Hiromi Takeuchi (JPN)	Yoo Boo-won (KOR)	Lee Hyun-jung (KOR)
1990 Sapporo	Wang Xiulan (CHN)	Lee Hyun-jung (KOR)	Chun Lee-kyung (KOR)
1996 Harbin	Chun Lee-kyung (KOR)	Won Hye-kyung (KOR)	Ikue Teshigawara (JPN)
1999 Gangwon	Yang Yang (CHN)	Wang Chunlu (CHN)	Kim Yun-mi (KOR)
2003 Aomori	Yang Yang (CHN)	Fu Tianyu (CHN)	Cho Ha-ri (KOR)
2007 Changchun	Jin Sun-yu (KOR)	Wang Meng (CHN)	Jung Eun-ju (KOR)
2011 Astana–Almaty	Park Seung-hi (KOR)	Cho Ha-ri (KOR)	Liu Qiuhong (CHN)
2017 Sapporo	Shim Suk-hee (KOR)	Choi Min-jeong (KOR)	Sumire Kikuchi (JPN)
2025 Harbin	Choi Min-jeong (KOR)	Kim Gil-li (KOR)	Zhang Chutong (CHN)

=== 1500 m ===
Games	Gold	Silver	Bronze
1986 Sapporo	Mariko Kinoshita (JPN)	Hiromi Takeuchi (JPN)	Yoo Boo-won (KOR)
1990 Sapporo	Kim So-hee (KOR)	Zhang Yanmei (CHN)	Li Yan (CHN)
1996 Harbin	Yang Yang (CHN)	Chun Lee-kyung (KOR)	Kim Yun-mi (KOR)
1999 Gangwon	Kim Yun-mi (KOR)	Yang Yang (CHN)	Yang Yang (CHN)
2003 Aomori	Choi Eun-kyung (KOR)	Cho Ha-ri (KOR)	Ko Gi-hyun (KOR)
2007 Changchun	Jung Eun-ju (KOR)	Jin Sun-yu (KOR)	Wang Meng (CHN)
2011 Astana–Almaty	Cho Ha-ri (KOR)	Park Seung-hi (KOR)	Biba Sakurai (JPN)
2017 Sapporo	Choi Min-jeong (KOR)	Shim Suk-hee (KOR)	Guo Yihan (CHN)
2025 Harbin	Kim Gil-li (KOR)	Gong Li (CHN)	Zang Yize (CHN)

=== 3000 m ===
Games	Gold	Silver	Bronze
1986 Sapporo	Eiko Shishii (JPN)	Yoo Boo-won (KOR)	Hiromi Takeuchi (JPN)
1990 Sapporo	Zhang Yanmei (CHN)	Keiko Asai (JPN)	Ri Gyong-hui (PRK)
1996 Harbin	Kim Yun-mi (KOR)	Won Hye-kyung (KOR)	Chun Lee-kyung (KOR)
1999 Gangwon	Kim Moon-jung (KOR)	Wang Chunlu (CHN)	Choi Min-kyung (KOR)
2003 Aomori	Yang Yang (CHN)	Choi Eun-kyung (KOR)	Kim Min-jee (KOR)

=== 3000 m relay ===
Games	Gold	Silver	Bronze
1990 Sapporo	China (CHN); Li Yan; Wang Xiulan; Zhang Yanmei; Zheng Chunyang	South Korea (KOR); Chun Lee-kyung; Kim So-hee; Lee Hyun-jung; Lee Yun-sook	Japan (JPN)
1996 Harbin	China (CHN); Sun Dandan; Wang Chunlu; Yang Yang; Yang Yang	South Korea (KOR); An Sang-mi; Kim So-hee; Kim Yun-mi; Won Hye-kyung	Japan (JPN); Miwako Muraoka; Sachi Ozawa; Ikue Teshigawara; Nobuko Yamada
1999 Gangwon	South Korea (KOR); Choi Min-kyung; Kim Yun-mi; An Sang-mi; Kim Moon-jung	Japan (JPN); Yuka Kamino; Chikage Tanaka; Atsuko Takata; Sayuri Yagi	None awarded
2003 Aomori	South Korea (KOR); Joo Min-jin; Choi Eun-kyung; Kim Min-jee; Cho Ha-ri	North Korea (PRK); Ri Hyang-mi; Jong Ok-myong; Mun Sun-ae; Yun Jong-suk	Japan (JPN); Ikue Teshigawara; Yuka Kamino; Mika Ozawa; Yoko Iizuka
2007 Changchun	China (CHN); Wang Meng; Fu Tianyu; Zhu Mile; Cheng Xiaolei; Zhou Yang	South Korea (KOR); Jeon Ji-soo; Byun Chun-sa; Jung Eun-ju; Jin Sun-yu; Kim Min-jung	Japan (JPN); Yuka Kamino; Yuko Koya; Ayuko Ito; Satomi Sakai
2011 Astana–Almaty	China (CHN); Zhou Yang; Liu Qiuhong; Fan Kexin; Zhang Hui; Zhao Nannan	South Korea (KOR); Park Seung-hi; Cho Ha-ri; Yang Shin-young; Hwang Hyun-sun; Kim Dam-min	Kazakhstan (KAZ); Inna Simonova; Xeniya Motova; Darya Volokitina; Anna Samarina
2017 Sapporo	South Korea (KOR); Shim Suk-hee; Choi Min-jeong; Noh Do-hee; Kim Ji-yoo; Kim Geon-hee	China (CHN); Fan Kexin; Qu Chunyu; Zang Yize; Guo Yihan; Lin Yue	Kazakhstan (KAZ); Kim Iong-a; Anastassiya Krestova; Madina Zhanbussinova; Anita Nagay; Olga Tikhonova
2025 Harbin	China (CHN); Fan Kexin; Gong Li; Zhang Chutong; Wang Xinran; Zang Yize; Yang Jingru	Kazakhstan (KAZ); Olga Tikhonova; Yana Khan; Alina Azhgaliyeva; Malika Yermek; Zeinep Kumarkan; Madina Zhanbussinova	Japan (JPN); Rina Shimada; Yuki Ishikawa; Haruna Nagamori; Riho Inuzuka; Miyu Miyashita; Kurumi Shimane

== Mixed ==
=== 2000 m relay ===
Games	Gold	Silver	Bronze
2025 Harbin	South Korea (KOR); Kim Gil-li; Choi Min-jeong; Park Ji-won; Kim Tae-sung; Jang Sung-woo; Noh Do-hee; Shim Suk-hee; Kim Gun-woo	Kazakhstan (KAZ); Yana Khan; Malika Yermek; Denis Nikisha; Adil Galiakhmetov; Alina Azhgaliyeva; Olga Tikhonova; Mersaid Zhaxybayev; Abzal Azhgaliyev	Japan (JPN); Rina Shimada; Riho Inuzuka; Shun Saito; Tsubasa Furukawa; Yuki Ishikawa; Shuta Matsuzu; Miyu Miyashita; Kota Kikuchi
