= Short-track speed skating at the 2007 Asian Winter Games =

- Venue: Wuhuan Gymnasium
- Dates: 29–31 January 2007
- Competitors: 60 from 8 nations

Short-track speed skating at the 2007 Asian Winter Games was held at the Changchun Wuhuan Gymnasium in Changchun, China. Events were held from 29 January to 31 January 2007.

== Schedule ==
H	Heats	Q	Quarterfinals	S	Semifinals	F	Finals

Event↓/Date →	29th Mon			30th Tue				31st Wed			
Men's 500 m				H	Q	S	F				
Men's 1000 m								H	Q	S	F
Men's 1500 m	H	S	F								
Men's 5000 m relay				S				F			
Women's 500 m				H	Q	S	F				
Women's 1000 m								H	Q	S	F
Women's 1500 m	H	S	F								
Women's 3000 m relay	S							F			

== Medalists ==
=== Men ===
Event	Gold	Silver	Bronze
500 m	Hu Ze; China	Song Kyung-taek; South Korea	Li Ye; China
1000 m	Ahn Hyun-soo; South Korea	Kim Hyun-kon; South Korea	Sui Baoku; China
1500 m	Sui Baoku; China	Ahn Hyun-soo; South Korea	Li Ye; China
5000 m relay	South Korea; Song Kyung-taek; Kim Hyun-kon; Ahn Hyun-soo; Lee Ho-suk; Kim Byeong-jun	China; Li Ye; Sui Baoku; Liu Xiaoliang; Hu Ze; Wang Hongyang	Japan; Junji Ito; Satoru Terao; Shinichi Tagami; Satoshi Sakashita

=== Women ===
Event	Gold	Silver	Bronze
500 m	Wang Meng; China	Fu Tianyu; China	Zhu Mile; China
500 m	Wang Meng; China	Fu Tianyu; China	Byun Chun-sa; South Korea
1000 m	Jin Sun-yu; South Korea	Wang Meng; China	Jung Eun-ju; South Korea
1500 m	Jung Eun-ju; South Korea	Jin Sun-yu; South Korea	Wang Meng; China
3000 m relay	China; Wang Meng; Fu Tianyu; Zhu Mile; Cheng Xiaolei; Zhou Yang	South Korea; Jeon Ji-soo; Byun Chun-sa; Jung Eun-ju; Jin Sun-yu; Kim Min-jung	Japan; Yuka Kamino; Yuko Koya; Ayuko Ito; Satomi Sakai

== Medal table ==
Rank	Nation	Gold	Silver	Bronze	Total
1	South Korea (KOR)	4	5	2	11
2	China (CHN)	4	3	5	12
3	Japan (JPN)	0	0	2	2
Totals (3 entries)		8	8	9	25

== Participating nations ==
A total of 60 athletes from 8 nations competed in short-track speed skating at the 2007 Asian Winter Games:

- China (10)
- Chinese Taipei (8)
- Hong Kong (2)
- Japan (8)
- Kazakhstan (10)
- Mongolia (2)
- North Korea (10)
- South Korea (10)
