= Short-track speed skating at the 2007 Asian Winter Games – Women's 1000 metres =

Women's 1000 metres at the 2007 Asian Winter Games
- Venue: Wuhuan Gymnasium
- Dates: 31 January 2007
- Competitors: 20 from 7 nations

Medalists
gold medal	Jin Sun-yu	South Korea
silver medal	Wang Meng	China
bronze medal	Jung Eun-ju	South Korea

The women's 1000 metres at the 2007 Asian Winter Games was held on January 31, 2007 at Wuhuan Gymnasium, China.

== Schedule ==
All times are China Standard Time (UTC+08:00)

Date	Time	Event
Wednesday, 31 January 2007	18:30	Heats
Wednesday, 31 January 2007	19:20	Quarterfinals
Wednesday, 31 January 2007	20:02	Semifinals
Wednesday, 31 January 2007	20:28	Finals

== Results ==
Legend

- DSQ — Disqualified

=== Heats ===
- Qualification: 1–3 → Quarterfinals (Q)

==== Heat 1 ====
Rank	Athlete	Time	Notes
1	Jung Eun-ju (KOR)	1:54.564	Q
2	Zhou Yang (CHN)	1:54.660	Q
3	Xeniya Motova (KAZ)	1:56.150	Q
4	Huang Yu-ting (TPE)	1:56.271	

==== Heat 2 ====
Rank	Athlete	Time	Notes
1	Jin Sun-yu (KOR)	1:40.216	Q
2	Kang Kyong-hwa (PRK)	1:43.398	Q
3	Yang Szu-han (TPE)	1:52.585	Q
—	Yuka Kamino (JPN)	DSQ	

==== Heat 3 ====
Rank	Athlete	Time	Notes
1	Wang Meng (CHN)	1:47.054	Q
2	Yun Jong-suk (PRK)	1:47.471	Q
3	Han Yueshuang (HKG)	1:48.305	Q
4	Kuo Chia-pei (TPE)	1:50.630	

==== Heat 4 ====
Rank	Athlete	Time	Notes
1	Zhu Mile (CHN)	1:41.679	Q
2	Ayuko Ito (JPN)	1:42.059	Q
3	Inna Simonova (KAZ)	1:42.179	Q
4	Chan Suet Ying (HKG)	1:52.083	

==== Heat 5 ====
Rank	Athlete	Time	Notes
1	Byun Chun-sa (KOR)	1:41.793	Q
2	Yuko Koya (JPN)	1:42.306	Q
3	Kim Jong-mi (PRK)	1:42.619	Q
4	Yelena Skachkova (KAZ)	1:47.895	

=== Quarterfinals ===
- Qualification: 1–2 → Semifinals (Q)

==== Heat 1 ====
Rank	Athlete	Time	Notes
1	Jin Sun-yu (KOR)	1:36.384	Q
2	Zhou Yang (CHN)	1:36.700	Q
3	Kang Kyong-hwa (PRK)	1:40.507	

==== Heat 2 ====
Rank	Athlete	Time	Notes
1	Zhu Mile (CHN)	1:38.948	Q
2	Yuko Koya (JPN)	1:39.416	Q
3	Xeniya Motova (KAZ)	1:41.206	
—	Yun Jong-suk (PRK)	DSQ	

==== Heat 3 ====
Rank	Athlete	Time	Notes
1	Byun Chun-sa (KOR)	1:40.137	Q
2	Ayuko Ito (JPN)	1:40.342	Q
3	Inna Simonova (KAZ)	1:40.819	
4	Yang Szu-han (TPE)	1:48.562	

==== Heat 4 ====
Rank	Athlete	Time	Notes
1	Jung Eun-ju (KOR)	1:34.853	Q
2	Wang Meng (CHN)	1:34.919	Q
3	Kim Jong-mi (PRK)	1:39.133	
4	Han Yueshuang (HKG)	1:39.162	

=== Semifinals ===
- Qualification: 1–2 → Final A (QA), 3–4 → Final B (QB)

==== Heat 1 ====
Rank	Athlete	Time	Notes
1	Wang Meng (CHN)	1:33.447	QA
2	Jung Eun-ju (KOR)	1:33.519	QA
3	Byun Chun-sa (KOR)	1:33.573	QB
4	Ayuko Ito (JPN)	1:36.137	QB

==== Heat 2 ====
Rank	Athlete	Time	Notes
1	Jin Sun-yu (KOR)	1:30.547	QA
2	Zhou Yang (CHN)	1:30.560	QA
3	Zhu Mile (CHN)	1:31.376	QB
4	Yuko Koya (JPN)	1:31.479	QB

=== Finals ===
==== Final B ====
Rank	Athlete	Time
1	Byun Chun-sa (KOR)	1:34.503
2	Zhu Mile (CHN)	1:34.577
3	Yuko Koya (JPN)	1:34.955
4	Ayuko Ito (JPN)	1:37.082

==== Final A ====
Rank	Athlete	Time
1st place, gold medalist(s)	Jin Sun-yu (KOR)	1:33.042
2nd place, silver medalist(s)	Wang Meng (CHN)	1:33.115
3rd place, bronze medalist(s)	Jung Eun-ju (KOR)	1:33.143
4	Zhou Yang (CHN)	1:34.021
