= Short-track speed skating at the 2007 Asian Winter Games – Women's 3000 metre relay =

Women's 3000 metre relay at the 2007 Asian Winter Games
- Venue: Wuhuan Gymnasium
- Dates: 29–31 January 2007
- Competitors: 26 from 6 nations

Medalists
gold medal	China; Wang Meng, Fu Tianyu, Zhu Mile, Cheng Xiaolei, Zhou Yang
silver medal	South Korea; Jeon Ji-soo, Byun Chun-sa, Jung Eun-ju, Jin Sun-yu, Kim Min-jung
bronze medal	Japan; Yuka Kamino, Yuko Koya, Ayuko Ito, Satomi Sakai

The women's 3000 metre relay at the 2007 Asian Winter Games was held on January 29 and 31, 2007 at the Wuhuan Gymnasium, China.

== Schedule ==
All times are China Standard Time (UTC+08:00)

Date	Time	Event
Monday, 29 January 2007	20:20	Semifinals
Wednesday, 31 January 2007	20:55	Final

== Results ==
Legend

- DSQ — Disqualified

=== Semifinals ===
- Qualification: 1–2 → Final (Q)

==== Heat 1 ====
Rank	Team	Time	Notes
1	South Korea (KOR); Jeon Ji-soo; Jung Eun-ju; Jin Sun-yu; Kim Min-jung	4:20.673	Q
2	Japan (JPN); Yuka Kamino; Yuko Koya; Ayuko Ito; Satomi Sakai	4:24.225	Q
—	North Korea (PRK); Ri Hyang-mi; Yun Jong-suk; Kang Kyong-hwa; Pang Su-ryon	DSQ	

==== Heat 2 ====
Rank	Team	Time	Notes
1	China (CHN); Wang Meng; Fu Tianyu; Zhu Mile; Zhou Yang	4:20.282	Q
2	Kazakhstan (KAZ); Yelena Skachkova; Yelizaveta Sigulenkova; Xeniya Motova; Inna Simonova	4:46.926	Q
3	Chinese Taipei (TPE); Huang Yu-ting; Kuo Chia-pei; Yang Szu-han; Chang Yu-tzu	4:53.824	

=== Final ===
Rank	Team	Time
1st place, gold medalist(s)	China (CHN); Wang Meng; Fu Tianyu; Zhu Mile; Cheng Xiaolei	4:13.293
2nd place, silver medalist(s)	South Korea (KOR); Jeon Ji-soo; Byun Chun-sa; Jung Eun-ju; Jin Sun-yu	4:13.391
3rd place, bronze medalist(s)	Japan (JPN); Yuka Kamino; Yuko Koya; Ayuko Ito; Satomi Sakai	4:26.020
4	Kazakhstan (KAZ); Yelena Skachkova; Yelizaveta Sigulenkova; Xeniya Motova; Inna Simonova	4:47.924
