= Short-track speed skating at the 2007 Asian Winter Games – Women's 1500 metres =

Women's 1500 metres at the 2007 Asian Winter Games
- Venue: Wuhuan Gymnasium
- Dates: 29 January 2007
- Competitors: 19 from 7 nations

Medalists
| gold medal | Jung Eun-ju | South Korea |
| silver medal | Jin Sun-yu | South Korea |
| bronze medal | Wang Meng | China |

The women's 1500 metres at the 2007 Asian Winter Games was held on January 29, 2007 at Wuhuan Gymnasium, China.

== Schedule ==
All times are China Standard Time (UTC+08:00)

| Date | Time | Event |
|---|---|---|
| Monday, 29 January 2007 | 18:30 | Heats |
| Monday, 29 January 2007 | 19:20 | Semifinals |
| Monday, 29 January 2007 | 19:50 | Finals |

== Results ==
Legend

- DNS — Did not start
- DSQ — Disqualified

=== Heats ===
- Qualification: 1–3 → Semifinals (Q)

==== Heat 1 ====
| Rank | Athlete | Time | Notes |
|---|---|---|---|
| 1 | Wang Meng (CHN) | 3:05.380 | Q |
| 2 | Jin Sun-yu (KOR) | 3:05.680 | Q |
| 3 | Yuko Koya (JPN) | 3:06.490 | Q |
| 4 | Darya Volokitina (KAZ) | 3:09.280 | |
| 5 | Yang Szu-han (TPE) | 3:11.520 | |

==== Heat 2 ====
| Rank | Athlete | Time | Notes |
|---|---|---|---|
| 1 | Byun Chun-sa (KOR) | 2:54.816 | Q |
| 2 | Cheng Xiaolei (CHN) | 2:54.932 | Q |
| 3 | Ayuko Ito (JPN) | 2:56.608 | Q |
| 4 | Ri Hyang-mi (PRK) | 3:14.760 | |

==== Heat 3 ====
| Rank | Athlete | Time | Notes |
|---|---|---|---|
| 1 | Jung Eun-ju (KOR) | 2:39.619 | Q |
| 2 | Zhou Yang (CHN) | 2:39.709 | Q |
| 3 | Kang Kyong-hwa (PRK) | 2:40.139 | Q |
| 4 | Huang Yu-ting (TPE) | 2:45.566 | |
| 5 | Yelena Skachkova (KAZ) | 2:46.772 | |

==== Heat 4 ====
| Rank | Athlete | Time | Notes |
|---|---|---|---|
| 1 | Yuka Kamino (JPN) | 2:45.768 | Q |
| 2 | Yun Jong-suk (PRK) | 2:46.643 | Q |
| 3 | Han Yueshuang (HKG) | 2:46.951 | Q |
| 4 | Inna Simonova (KAZ) | 2:47.400 | |
| 5 | Kuo Chia-pei (TPE) | 2:50.323 | |

=== Semifinals ===
- Qualification: 1–3 → Final A (QA), 4–6 → Final B (QB)

==== Heat 1 ====
| Rank | Athlete | Time | Notes |
|---|---|---|---|
| 1 | Wang Meng (CHN) | 2:34.709 | QA |
| 2 | Jung Eun-ju (KOR) | 2:34.788 | QA |
| 3 | Jin Sun-yu (KOR) | 2:34.878 | QA |
| 4 | Yuko Koya (JPN) | 2:35.335 | QB |
| 5 | Han Yueshuang (HKG) | 2:37.318 | QB |
| 6 | Yun Jong-suk (PRK) | 2:37.445 | QB |

==== Heat 2 ====
| Rank | Athlete | Time | Notes |
|---|---|---|---|
| 1 | Zhou Yang (CHN) | 2:30.251 | QA |
| 2 | Byun Chun-sa (KOR) | 2:30.370 | QA |
| 3 | Cheng Xiaolei (CHN) | 2:30.526 | QA |
| 4 | Yuka Kamino (JPN) | 2:30.765 | QB |
| 5 | Kang Kyong-hwa (PRK) | 2:31.839 | QB |
| 6 | Ayuko Ito (JPN) | 2:38.639 | QB |

=== Finals ===
==== Final B ====
| Rank | Athlete | Time |
|---|---|---|
| 1 | Yuko Koya (JPN) | 3:01.918 |
| 2 | Han Yueshuang (HKG) | 3:03.570 |
| 3 | Yuka Kamino (JPN) | 3:13.246 |
| — | Ayuko Ito (JPN) | DSQ |
| — | Yun Jong-suk (PRK) | DNS |
| — | Kang Kyong-hwa (PRK) | DNS |

==== Final A ====
| Rank | Athlete | Time |
|---|---|---|
| 1st place, gold medalist(s) | Jung Eun-ju (KOR) | 2:24.089 |
| 2nd place, silver medalist(s) | Jin Sun-yu (KOR) | 2:24.124 |
| 3rd place, bronze medalist(s) | Wang Meng (CHN) | 2:24.408 |
| 4 | Cheng Xiaolei (CHN) | 2:32.230 |
| 5 | Zhou Yang (CHN) | 2:58.264 |
| — | Byun Chun-sa (KOR) | DSQ |
