= List of speed skaters =

The following is a list of notable ice speed skaters. The list is sorted by speed skating discipline (long-track or short-track), gender and competing nationality.

== Long-track ==
=== Male ===
==== American ====
- Ryan Bedford
- K. C. Boutiette
- Kip Carpenter
- Joey Cheek
- Shani Davis
- John Farrell
- Casey FitzRandolph
- Eric Flaim
- Tucker Fredricks
- Chad Hedrick
- Eric Heiden
- Ken Henry
- Irving Jaffee
- Dan Jansen
- Charles Jewtraw
- Jonathan Kuck
- Charles Ryan Leveille
- Trevor Marsicano
- Terry McDermott
- Peter Mueller
- Apolo Ohno
- Derek Parra
- Tom Plant
- Andy Roesch
- Jack Shea
- Jordan Stolz
- Nick Thometz

==== Australian ====
- Colin Coates
- Colin Hickey
- Danny Kah
- Kenneth Kennedy
- Michael Richmond
- Phillip Tahmindjis

==== Austrian ====
- Roland Brunner
- Christian Eminger
- Michael Hadschieff
- Werner Jäger
- Heinz Steinberger

==== Belarusian ====
- Igor Zhelezovski (also competed for Soviet Union)

==== Belgian ====
- Bart Veldkamp (also competed in the Netherlands)
- Bart Swings

==== British ====
- Bryan Carbis
- Julian Green
- Wilf O'Reilly

==== Canadian ====
- Andrew Barron
- Gaétan Boucher
- Sylvain Bouchard
- Arne Dankers
- Steven Elm
- Mike Ireland
- Patrick Kelly
- Neal Marshall
- Denny Morrison
- Jason Parker
- Kevin Scott
- Justin Warsylewicz
- Jeremy Wotherspoon

==== Colombian ====
- Pedro Causil

==== Czech ====
- Milan Sáblík

==== Dutch ====
- Henk Angenent
- Jan Bazen
- Jeen van den Berg
- Jelmer Beulenkamp
- Ted-Jan Bloemen (also competed for Canada)
- Jan Blokhuijsen
- Lieuwe de Boer
- Jan Bols
- Jenning de Boo
- Jan Bos
- Thomas Bos
- Kees Broekman
- Ben van der Burg
- Theun Busser
- Lex Cazemier
- Jappie van Dijk
- Hilbert van der Duim
- Jaap Eden
- Arie Eriks
- Co Giling
- Henk van der Grift
- Ton Groot
- Stefan Groothuis
- Hans van Helden (also competed for France)
- Martin Hersman
- Wouter olde Heuvel
- Emiel Hopman
- Jesper Hospes
- Lammert Huitema
- Bob de Jong
- Rein Jonker
- Jorrit Jorritsma
- Gerard Kemkers
- Richard van Kempen
- Rhian Ket
- Piet Kleine
- Coen de Koning
- Sven Kramer
- Yep Kramer
- Jan Roelof Kruithof
- Harm Kuipers
- Simon Kuipers
- Jakko Jan Leeuwangh
- Rudie Liebrechts
- Michel Mulder
- Ronald Mulder
- Jos Niesten
- Beorn Nijenhuis
- Henk Portengen
- Ids Postma
- Tom Prinsen
- Rintje Ritsma
- Gianni Romme
- Henri Ruitenberg
- René Ruitenberg
- Frits Schalij
- Ard Schenk
- Jan Smeekens
- Yuri Solinger
- Mark Tuitert
- Jan Uitham
- Jochem Uytdehaage
- Gerard van Velde
- Bart Veldkamp (also competed for Belgium)
- Hein Vergeer
- Carl Verheijen
- Kees Verkerk
- Koen Verweij
- Leo Visser
- Klaas Vriend
- Erben Wennemars
- Johan Wardenier
- Jan Ykema
- Falko Zandstra

==== Finnish ====
- Janne Hänninen
- Juhani Järvinen
- Pekka Koskela
- Pertti Niittylä
- Urpo Pikkupeura
- Mika Poutala
- Jukka Salmela
- Toivo Salonen
- Julius Skutnabb
- Clas Thunberg
- Jarmo Valtonen
- Jouko Vesterlund

==== French ====
- Alexis Contin
- Jean-Noël Fagot
- Hans van Helden (also competed for the Netherlands)
- Thierry Lamberton
- Emmanuel Michon
- Tonny Monari (also competed for the Netherlands)

==== German ====
- Frank Dittrich (also competed for DDR)
- Jens Boden
- Uwe-Jens Mey (also competed for DDR)
- Samuel Schwarz
- Olaf Zinke (also competed for DDR)

===== DDR (East German) =====
- Andreas Ehrig
- André Hoffmann
- Uwe-Jens Mey

===== BRD (West German) =====
- Erhard Keller

==== Japanese ====
- Toru Aoyanagi
- Manabu Horii
- Junichi Inoue
- Joji Kato
- Yoshihiro Kitazawa
- Akira Kuroiwa
- Toshiyuki Kuroiwa
- Yasunori Miyabe
- Yukinori Miyabe
- Hiroyasu Shimizu
- Keiichi Suzuki

==== Korean ====
===== ROK (South Korean) =====
- Joo Hyong-jun (also competes short-track)
- Kim Cheol-min (also competes short-track)
- Lee Kang-seok
- Lee Kyou-hyuk
- Mo Tae-bum

==== Italian ====
- Enrico Fabris
- Maurizio Marchetto
- Mirko Giacomo Nenzi
- Ippolito Sanfratello
- Roberto Sighel

==== Kazakh ====
- Vadim Sayutin (also competed for Russia)

==== Mexican ====
- Eric Kraan

==== Norwegian ====
- Nils Aaness
- Roald Aas
- Hjalmar Andersen
- Petter Andersen
- Terje Andersen
- Ivar Ballangrud
- Håvard Bøkko
- Thomas Byberg
- Armand Carlsen
- Jørn Didriksen
- Lasse Efskind
- Kai Arne Engelstad
- Ivar Eriksen
- Eskil Ervik
- Bernt Evensen
- Rolf Falk-Larssen
- Sverre Farstad
- Dag Fornæss
- Alv Gjestvang
- Øystein Grødum
- Roar Grønvold
- Rudolf Gundersen
- Per Willy Guttormsen
- Villy Haugen
- Sverre Ingolf Haugli
- Finn Helgesen
- Knut Johannesen
- Arne Johansen
- Geir Karlstad
- Johann Olav Koss
- Roald Larsen
- Reidar Liaklev
- Odd Lundberg
- Fred Anton Maier
- Charles Mathiesen
- Oscar Mathisen
- Per Ivar Moe
- Alfred Næss
- Peder Østlund
- Tom Erik Oxholm
- Frode Rønning
- Lasse Sætre
- Amund Sjøbrend
- Ådne Søndrål
- Michael Staksrud
- Sten Stensen
- Kay Arne Stenshjemmet
- Rune Stordal
- Kjell Storelid
- Jan Egil Storholt
- Harald Strøm
- Kristian Strøm
- Roger Strøm
- Arnulf Sunde
- Magne Thomassen
- Erik Vea
- Even Wetten

==== Polish ====
- Zbigniew Bródka

==== Russian ====
- Dmitry Dorofeyev
- Aleksandr Golubev (also competed for Soviet Union)
- Dmitry Lobkov
- Dmitry Shepel
- Ivan Skobrev
- Aleksey Yesin
- Denis Yuskov

==== Soviet ====
- Ants Antson
- Andrey Bobrov
- Dmitry Bochkaryov
- Oleg Bozhev
- Sergey Fokichev
- Oleg Goncharenko
- Yevgeny Grishin
- Nikolay Gulyayev
- Vasily Ippolitov
- Sergey Klevchenya
- Sergey Khlebnikov
- Viktor Kosichkin
- Yevgeny Kulikov
- Vladimir Lobanov
- Viktor Lyoskin
- Igor Malkov
- Sergey Marchuk
- Eduard Matusevich
- Yuri Mikhaylov
- Valery Muratov
- Dmitry Ogloblin
- Pavel Pegov
- Viktor Shasherin
- Boris Shilkov
- Vladimir Shilykovsky
- Boris Stenin
- Nikolay Strunnikov

==== Swedish ====
- Nils van der Poel
- Per Bengtsson
- Göran Claeson
- Sigvard Ericsson
- Tomas Gustafson
- Johnny Höglin
- Hans Markström
- Jonny Nilsson
- Johan Röjler
- Örjan Sandler
- Jonas Schön
- Åke Seyffarth
- Mats Wallberg

==== Swiss ====
- Franz Krienbühl
- Notger "Nök" Ledergerber
- Roger Schneider

=== Female ===
==== American ====
- Chantal Bailey
- Bonnie Blair
- Rebekah Bradford
- Beth Heiden
- Anne Henning
- Dianne Holum
- Kit Klein
- Maria Lamb
- Leah Poulos-Mueller
- Jennifer Rodriguez
- Chris Witty
- Sheila Young
- Ellie Ochowicz
- Catherine Raney
- Heather Richardson-Bergsma
- Nancy Swider
- Christine Witty

==== Austrian ====
- Emese Antal (born in Romania)
- Emese Hunyady (also competed for Hungary)

==== Canadian ====
- Susan Auch
- Ivanie Blondin
- Lela Brooks
- Sylvia Burka
- Sylvie Daigle
- Eden Donatelli
- Kristina Groves
- Clara Hughes
- Gilmore Junio
- Cindy Klassen
- Catriona Le May Doan
- Christine Nesbitt
- Shannon Rempel
- Brittany Schussler

==== Czech ====
- Martina Sáblíková

==== Danish ====
- Cathrine Grage

==== Dutch ====
- Margot Boer
- Annie Borckink
- Wieteke Cramer
- Paulien van Deutekom
- Carry Geijssen
- Yvonne van Gennip
- Annette Gerritsen
- Renate Groenewold
- Lenie van der Hoorn
- Pien Keulstra
- Tonny de Jong
- Stien Kaiser
- Atje Keulen-Deelstra
- Marrit Leenstra
- Barbara de Loor
- Rixt Meijer
- Jorien ter Mors
- Laurine van Riessen
- Ans Schut
- Klasina Seinstra
- Gretha Smit
- Marianne Timmer
- Diane Valkenburg
- Lotte van Beek
- Renske Vellinga
- Marja Vis
- Ria Visser
- Elma de Vries
- Linda de Vries
- Foske Tamar van der Wal
- Ireen Wüst

==== Finnish ====
- Kaija Mustonen

==== German ====
- Daniela Anschütz-Thoms
- Stephanie Beckert
- Jacqueline Börner (also competed for DDR)
- Anni Friesinger-Postma
- Monique Garbrecht-Enfeldt (also competed for DDR)
- Bente Kraus
- Gunda Niemann-Stirnemann (also competed for DDR)
- Claudia Pechstein (also competed for DDR)
- Christa Luding-Rothenburger (also competed for DDR)
- Franziska Schenk (also competed for DDR)
- Sabine Völker (also competed for DDR)
- Jenny Wolf

===== DDR (East German) =====
- Karin Enke
- Andrea Ehrig-Mitscherlich
- Helga Haase
- Constanze Moser-Scandolo
- Gabi Zange

===== BRD (West German) =====
- Monika Pflug

==== Japanese ====
- Seiko Hashimoto
- Tomomi Okazaki

==== Korean ====
===== DPRK (North Korean) =====
- Han Pil-Hwa

===== ROK (South Korean) =====
- Lee Sang-hwa

==== Norwegian ====
- Hege Bøkko
- Maren Haugli
- Edel Therese Høiseth
- Bjørg Eva Jensen
- Synnøve Lie
- Laila Schou Nilsen

==== Russian ====
- Svetlana Bazhanova
- Svetlana Zhurova

==== Soviet ====
- Inga Artamonova
- Tatyana Averina
- Vera Bryndzei
- Maria Isakova
- Natalya Petrusyova
- Tamara Rylova
- Lidia Skoblikova
- Nina Statkevich
- Valentina Stenina
- Galina Stepanskaya
- Lyudmila Titova
- Rimma Zhukova

==== Swedish ====
- Jasmin Krohn

==== Swiss ====
- Sylvia Brunner

== Short-track ==
=== Male ===
==== American ====
- Apolo Anton Ohno
- JR Celski
- Dan Weinstein
- Anthony Lobello Jr
- Jordan Malone
- Simon Cho
- Rusty Smith
- Alex Izykowski
- Ryan Bedford
- Travis Jayner
- J. P. Kepka
- Kyle Uyehara
- Charles King
- Keith King

==== Australian ====
- Steven Bradbury

==== British ====
- Wilf O'Reilly

==== Canadian ====
- Eric Bedard
- Gaétan Boucher
- Marc Gagnon
- Michael Gilday
- Jonathan Guilmette
- Charles Hamelin
- François Hamelin
- François-Louis Tremblay
- Mathieu Turcotte
- Guillaume Bastille
- Olivier Jean
- Gilmore Junio

==== Chinese ====
- Li Jiajun

==== Dutch ====
- Lieuwe de Boer

==== Korean ====
===== DPRK (North Korean) =====
- Choe Un-song
- Jong Kwang-bom

===== ROK (South Korean) =====
- Ahn Hyun Soo
- Ahn Viktor (also competed for Russia)
- Chae Ji-hoon
- Hwang Dae-heon
- Joo Hyong-jun (also competes long-track)
- Kim Byeong-jun
- Kim Cheol-min (also competes long-track)
- Kim Do-kyoum
- Kim Dong-sung
- Kim Hwan-ee
- Kim Hyun-kon
- Kim Ki-hoon
- Kim Seoung-il
- Kim Tae-hoon
- Kim Yun-jae
- Kwak Yoon-gy
- Lee Han-bin
- Lee Ho-eung
- Lee Ho-Suk
- Lee Joon-ho
- Lee Jun-hwan
- Lee June-seo
- Lee Jung-Su
- Lee Seung-hoon
- Lim Hyo-jun
- Min Ryoung
- Mo Ji-soo
- Noh Jin-kyu
- Oh Se-jong
- Park Ji-won
- Park Se-yeong
- Seo Ho-Jin
- Seo Yi-ra
- Sin Da-woon
- Song Jae-kun
- Song Kyung-taek
- Song Suk-Woo
- Sung Si-Bak
- Um Cheon-ho

==== New Zealand ====
- Mike McMillen
- Andrew Nicholson
- Chris Nicholson
- Tony Smith
- Blake Skjellerup

=== Female ===
==== American ====
- Katherine Reutter
- Allison Baver
- Kimberly Derrick
- Carly Wilson
- Lana Gehring
- Alyson Dudek
- Cathy Turner

==== Bulgarian ====
- Evgenia Radanova

==== Canadian ====
- Susan Auch
- Sylvie Daigle
- Eden Donatelli
- Marie-Ève Drolet
- Jessica Gregg
- Alanna Kraus
- Anouk Leblanc-Boucher
- Valérie Maltais
- Amanda Overland
- Kalyna Roberge
- Marianne St-Gelais
- Tania Vicent

==== Chinese ====
- Wang Meng
- Yang Yang (A)
- Yang Yang (S)

==== Korean ====
===== DPRK (North Korean) =====
- Hwang Ok-sil
- Kim Chun-hwa
- Ri Hyang-mi

===== ROK (South Korean) =====
- An Sang-mi
- Byun Chun-sa
- Cho Ha-ri
- Choi Eun-kyung
- Choi Min-kyung
- Chun Lee-kyung
- Jeon Da-hye
- Jeon Ji-soo
- Jin Sun-Yu
- Joo Min-jin
- Jung Eun-ju
- Kim Alang
- Kim Min-jee
- Ko Gi-hyun
- Park Seung-hi
- Shim Suk-hee
- Noh Ah-Reum
