= Short-track speed skating at the 2007 Asian Winter Games – Women's 500 metres =

Women's 500 metres at the 2007 Asian Winter Games
- Venue: Wuhuan Gymnasium
- Dates: 30 January 2007
- Competitors: 20 from 7 nations

Medalists
gold medal	Wang Meng	China
silver medal	Fu Tianyu	China
bronze medal	Zhu Mile	China
bronze medal	Byun Chun-sa	South Korea

The women's 500 metres at the 2007 Asian Winter Games was held on January 30, 2007, at Wuhuan Gymnasium, China.

== Schedule ==
All times are China Standard Time (UTC+08:00)

Date	Time	Event
Tuesday, 30 January 2007	18:30	Heats
Tuesday, 30 January 2007	19:10	Quarterfinals
Tuesday, 30 January 2007	19:44	Semifinals
Tuesday, 30 January 2007	20:06	Finals

== Results ==
Legend

- DSQ — Disqualified

=== Heats ===
- Qualification: 1–3 → Quarterfinals (Q)

==== Heat 1 ====
Rank	Athlete	Time	Notes
1	Zhu Mile (CHN)	45.131	Q
2	Pang Su-ryon (PRK)	46.585	Q
3	Chan Suet Ying (HKG)	53.784	Q
—	Ayuko Ito (JPN)	DSQ	

==== Heat 2 ====
Rank	Athlete	Time	Notes
1	Wang Meng (CHN)	44.190	Q
2	Byun Chun-sa (KOR)	45.917	Q
3	Han Yueshuang (HKG)	46.980	Q
4	Inna Simonova (KAZ)	47.043	

==== Heat 3 ====
Rank	Athlete	Time	Notes
1	Kim Min-jung (KOR)	45.937	Q
2	Ri Hyang-mi (PRK)	46.018	Q
3	Yuka Kamino (JPN)	46.091	Q
4	Chang Yu-tzu (TPE)	1:04.913	

==== Heat 4 ====
Rank	Athlete	Time	Notes
1	Jeon Ji-soo (KOR)	44.453	Q
2	Kim Jong-mi (PRK)	46.660	Q
3	Yelena Skachkova (KAZ)	49.253	Q
4	Huang Yu-ting (TPE)	49.335	

==== Heat 5 ====
Rank	Athlete	Time	Notes
1	Fu Tianyu (CHN)	45.107	Q
2	Satomi Sakai (JPN)	46.644	Q
3	Xeniya Motova (KAZ)	48.856	Q
4	Kuo Chia-pei (TPE)	49.628	

=== Quarterfinals ===
- Qualification: 1–2 → Semifinals (Q)

==== Heat 1 ====
Rank	Athlete	Time	Notes
1	Wang Meng (CHN)	44.366	Q
2	Kim Jong-mi (PRK)	46.601	Q
—	Satomi Sakai (JPN)	DSQ	

==== Heat 2 ====
Rank	Athlete	Time	Notes
1	Jeon Ji-soo (KOR)	44.476	Q
2	Yuka Kamino (JPN)	46.876	Q
3	Chan Suet Ying (HKG)	53.981	
—	Ri Hyang-mi (PRK)	DSQ	

==== Heat 3 ====
Rank	Athlete	Time	Notes
1	Fu Tianyu (CHN)	44.947	Q
2	Byun Chun-sa (KOR)	45.449	Q
3	Pang Su-ryon (PRK)	46.540	
4	Yelena Skachkova (KAZ)	49.715	

==== Heat 4 ====
Rank	Athlete	Time	Notes
1	Zhu Mile (CHN)	44.686	Q
2	Kim Min-jung (KOR)	44.814	Q
3	Han Yueshuang (HKG)	47.510	
4	Xeniya Motova (KAZ)	48.656	

=== Semifinals ===
- Qualification: 1–2 → Final A (QA), 3–4 → Final B (QB)

==== Heat 1 ====
Rank	Athlete	Time	Notes
1	Wang Meng (CHN)	43.940	QA
2	Fu Tianyu (CHN)	44.054	QA
3	Kim Min-jung (KOR)	44.193	QB
4	Yuka Kamino (JPN)	45.961	QB

==== Heat 2 ====
Rank	Athlete	Time	Notes
1	Zhu Mile (CHN)	44.650	QA
2	Byun Chun-sa (KOR)	44.771	QA
3	Jeon Ji-soo (KOR)	44.818	QB
4	Kim Jong-mi (PRK)	46.274	QB

=== Finals ===
==== Final B ====
Rank	Athlete	Time
1	Jeon Ji-soo (KOR)	44.645
2	Kim Min-jung (KOR)	45.268
3	Kim Jong-mi (PRK)	45.623
4	Yuka Kamino (JPN)	45.673

==== Final A ====
Rank	Athlete	Time
1st place, gold medalist(s)	Wang Meng (CHN)	43.869
2nd place, silver medalist(s)	Fu Tianyu (CHN)	44.060
3rd place, bronze medalist(s)	Zhu Mile (CHN)	44.159
3rd place, bronze medalist(s)	Byun Chun-sa (KOR)	45.278

- Byun Chun-sa was awarded bronze because of no three-medal sweep per country rule.
