= Short-track speed skating at the 2007 Asian Winter Games – Men's 5000 metre relay =

Men's 5000 metre relay at the 2007 Asian Winter Games
- Venue: Wuhuan Gymnasium
- Dates: 30–31 January 2007
- Competitors: 27 from 6 nations

Medalists
gold medal	South Korea; Song Kyung-taek, Kim Hyun-kon, Ahn Hyun-soo, Lee Ho-suk, Kim Byeong-jun
silver medal	China; Li Ye, Sui Baoku, Liu Xiaoliang, Hu Ze, Wang Hongyang
bronze medal	Japan; Junji Ito, Satoru Terao, Shinichi Tagami, Satoshi Sakashita

The men's 5000 metre relay at the 2007 Asian Winter Games was held on January 30 and 31, 2007 at Wuhuan Gymnasium, China.

== Schedule ==
All times are China Standard Time (UTC+08:00)

Date	Time	Event
Tuesday, 30 January 2007	20:28	Semifinals
Wednesday, 31 January 2007	21:10	Final

== Results ==
Legend

- DNF — Did not finish

=== Semifinals ===
- Qualification: 1–2 → Final (Q)

==== Heat 1 ====
Rank	Team	Time	Notes
1	South Korea (KOR); Song Kyung-taek; Kim Hyun-kon; Ahn Hyun-soo; Kim Byeong-jun	6:49.441	Q
2	Kazakhstan (KAZ); Artur Sultangaliyev; Azamat Sultanaliyev; Aslan Daumov; Nurbergen Zhumagaziyev	7:31.321	Q
3	Chinese Taipei (TPE); Cheng Yi-lun; Tsai Ping-yuan; Lin Chueh; Liu Ming-hsien	7:34.973	

==== Heat 2 ====
Rank	Team	Time	Notes
1	China (CHN); Li Ye; Sui Baoku; Wang Hongyang; Hu Ze	6:57.634	Q
2	Japan (JPN); Junji Ito; Satoru Terao; Shinichi Tagami; Satoshi Sakashita	7:13.118	Q
3	North Korea (PRK); Ro Sun-chol; Han Chol-min; Ri Chol-song; Han Sang-guk	7:18.655	

=== Final ===
Rank	Team	Time
1st place, gold medalist(s)	South Korea (KOR); Song Kyung-taek; Kim Hyun-kon; Ahn Hyun-soo; Lee Ho-suk	6:44.839
2nd place, silver medalist(s)	China (CHN); Li Ye; Sui Baoku; Liu Xiaoliang; Hu Ze	6:52.078
3rd place, bronze medalist(s)	Japan (JPN); Junji Ito; Satoru Terao; Shinichi Tagami; Satoshi Sakashita	6:56.422
—	Kazakhstan (KAZ); Andrey Smetanin; Azamat Sultanaliyev; Aslan Daumov; Nurbergen Zhumagaziyev	DNF
