= Short-track speed skating at the 2007 Asian Winter Games – Men's 1000 metres =

Men's 1000 metres at the 2007 Asian Winter Games
- Venue: Wuhuan Gymnasium
- Dates: 31 January 2007
- Competitors: 20 from 7 nations

Medalists
gold medal	Ahn Hyun-soo	South Korea
silver medal	Kim Hyun-kon	South Korea
bronze medal	Sui Baoku	China

The men's 1000 metres at the 2007 Asian Winter Games was held on January 31, 2007, at Wuhuan Gymnasium, China.

== Schedule ==
All times are China Standard Time (UTC+08:00)

Date	Time	Event
Wednesday, 31 January 2007	18:50	Heats
Wednesday, 31 January 2007	19:36	Quarterfinals
Wednesday, 31 January 2007	20:10	Semifinals
Wednesday, 31 January 2007	20:36	Finals

== Results ==
Legend

- DSQ — Disqualified

=== Heats ===
- Qualification: 1–3 → Quarterfinals (Q)

==== Heat 1 ====
Rank	Athlete	Time	Notes
1	Hu Ze (CHN)	1:39.937	Q
2	Satoshi Sakashita (JPN)	1:40.004	Q
3	Ro Sun-chol (PRK)	1:40.547	Q
4	Aslan Daumov (KAZ)	1:41.407	

==== Heat 2 ====
Rank	Athlete	Time	Notes
1	Kim Hyun-kon (KOR)	1:32.128	Q
2	Sui Baoku (CHN)	1:33.178	Q
3	Lin Chueh (TPE)	1:41.561	Q
4	Gantömöriin Mönkhdorj (MGL)	1:48.233	

==== Heat 3 ====
Rank	Athlete	Time	Notes
1	Kim Byeong-jun (KOR)	1:38.769	Q
2	Ri Chol-song (PRK)	1:39.005	Q
3	Cheng Yi-lun (TPE)	1:39.136	Q
4	Artur Sultangaliyev (KAZ)	1:39.360	

==== Heat 4 ====
Rank	Athlete	Time	Notes
1	Ahn Hyun-soo (KOR)	1:39.198	Q
2	Junji Ito (JPN)	1:39.748	Q
3	Han Chol-min (PRK)	1:41.276	Q
4	Tsai Ping-yuan (TPE)	1:43.824	

==== Heat 5 ====
Rank	Athlete	Time	Notes
1	Satoru Terao (JPN)	1:42.671	Q
2	Li Ye (CHN)	1:42.992	Q
3	Nurbergen Zhumagaziyev (KAZ)	1:45.500	Q
4	Ganbatyn Mönkh-Amidral (MGL)	1:50.341	

=== Quarterfinals ===
- Qualification: 1–2 → Semifinals (Q)

==== Heat 1 ====
Rank	Athlete	Time	Notes
1	Kim Hyun-kon (KOR)	1:28.849	Q
2	Li Ye (CHN)	1:29.300	Q
3	Junji Ito (JPN)	1:29.310	

==== Heat 2 ====
Rank	Athlete	Time	Notes
1	Kim Byeong-jun (KOR)	1:32.238	Q
2	Satoshi Sakashita (JPN)	1:34.023	Q
—	Nurbergen Zhumagaziyev (KAZ)	DSQ	
—	Ri Chol-song (PRK)	DSQ	

==== Heat 3 ====
Rank	Athlete	Time	Notes
1	Sui Baoku (CHN)	1:33.323	Q
2	Ahn Hyun-soo (KOR)	1:33.531	Q
3	Han Chol-min (PRK)	1:34.196	
4	Cheng Yi-lun (TPE)	1:34.317	

==== Heat 4 ====
Rank	Athlete	Time	Notes
1	Hu Ze (CHN)	1:35.899	Q
2	Satoru Terao (JPN)	1:35.909	Q
3	Ro Sun-chol (PRK)	1:36.719	
4	Lin Chueh (TPE)	1:40.124	

=== Semifinals ===
- Qualification: 1–2 → Final A (QA), 3–4 → Final B (QB)

==== Heat 1 ====
Rank	Athlete	Time	Notes
1	Kim Hyun-kon (KOR)	1:28.390	QA
2	Li Ye (CHN)	1:28.602	QA
3	Hu Ze (CHN)	1:29.027	QB
4	Satoru Terao (JPN)	1:29.278	QB

==== Heat 2 ====
Rank	Athlete	Time	Notes
1	Ahn Hyun-soo (KOR)	1:30.397	QA
2	Sui Baoku (CHN)	1:30.514	QA
3	Kim Byeong-jun (KOR)	1:30.548	QB
4	Satoshi Sakashita (JPN)	1:32.310	QB

=== Finals ===
==== Final B ====
Rank	Athlete	Time
1	Hu Ze (CHN)	1:31.278
2	Satoru Terao (JPN)	1:31.768
3	Satoshi Sakashita (JPN)	1:32.374
4	Kim Byeong-jun (KOR)	2:24.411

==== Final A ====
Rank	Athlete	Time
1st place, gold medalist(s)	Ahn Hyun-soo (KOR)	1:29.085
2nd place, silver medalist(s)	Kim Hyun-kon (KOR)	1:29.163
3rd place, bronze medalist(s)	Sui Baoku (CHN)	1:29.299
—	Li Ye (CHN)	DSQ
