= Short-track speed skating at the 2007 Asian Winter Games – Men's 500 metres =

Men's 500 metres at the 2007 Asian Winter Games
- Venue: Wuhuan Gymnasium
- Dates: 30 January 2007
- Competitors: 19 from 7 nations

Medalists
gold medal	Hu Ze	China
silver medal	Song Kyung-taek	South Korea
bronze medal	Li Ye	China

The men's 500 metres at the 2007 Asian Winter Games was held on January 30, 2007 at Wuhuan Gymnasium, China.

== Schedule ==
All times are China Standard Time (UTC+08:00)

Date	Time	Event
Tuesday, 30 January 2007	18:45	Heats
Tuesday, 30 January 2007	19:22	Quarterfinals
Tuesday, 30 January 2007	19:50	Semifinals
Tuesday, 30 January 2007	20:12	Finals

== Results ==
Legend

- DNS — Did not start
- DSQ — Disqualified

=== Heats ===
- Qualification: 1–3 → Quarterfinals (Q)

==== Heat 1 ====
Rank	Athlete	Time	Notes
1	Kim Byeong-jun (KOR)	43.209	Q
2	Junji Ito (JPN)	43.312	Q
3	Nurbergen Zhumagaziyev (KAZ)	44.815	Q
4	Om Chol (PRK)	45.123	

==== Heat 2 ====
Rank	Athlete	Time	Notes
1	Song Kyung-taek (KOR)	42.754	Q
2	Satoru Terao (JPN)	42.933	Q
3	Azamat Sultanaliyev (KAZ)	46.392	Q
4	Gantömöriin Mönkhdorj (MGL)	1:01.038	

==== Heat 3 ====
Rank	Athlete	Time	Notes
1	Hu Ze (CHN)	42.610	Q
2	Ahn Hyun-soo (KOR)	42.617	Q
3	Artur Sultangaliyev (KAZ)	44.405	Q
4	Lin Chueh (TPE)	46.585	

==== Heat 4 ====
Rank	Athlete	Time	Notes
1	Liu Xiaoliang (CHN)	43.525	Q
2	Tsai Ping-yuan (TPE)	46.677	Q
3	Ganbatyn Mönkh-Amidral (MGL)	51.828	Q

==== Heat 5 ====
Rank	Athlete	Time	Notes
1	Li Ye (CHN)	42.650	Q
2	Satoshi Sakashita (JPN)	42.826	Q
3	Han Sang-guk (PRK)	44.159	Q
4	Cheng Yi-lun (TPE)	44.378	

=== Quarterfinals ===
- Qualification: 1–2 → Semifinals (Q)

==== Heat 1 ====
Rank	Athlete	Time	Notes
1	Hu Ze (CHN)	42.510	Q
2	Satoru Terao (JPN)	42.659	Q
3	Tsai Ping-yuan (TPE)	46.118	

==== Heat 2 ====
Rank	Athlete	Time	Notes
1	Ahn Hyun-soo (KOR)	42.180	Q
2	Li Ye (CHN)	42.194	Q
3	Junji Ito (JPN)	42.308	
4	Azamat Sultanaliyev (KAZ)	57.724	

==== Heat 3 ====
Rank	Athlete	Time	Notes
1	Song Kyung-taek (KOR)	42.655	Q
2	Han Sang-guk (PRK)	43.212	Q
3	Satoshi Sakashita (JPN)	44.246	
4	Nurbergen Zhumagaziyev (KAZ)	45.168	

==== Heat 4 ====
Rank	Athlete	Time	Notes
1	Kim Byeong-jun (KOR)	42.919	Q
2	Liu Xiaoliang (CHN)	42.950	Q
3	Artur Sultangaliyev (KAZ)	44.473	
—	Ganbatyn Mönkh-Amidral (MGL)	DNS	

=== Semifinals ===
- Qualification: 1–2 → Final A (QA), 3–4 → Final B (QB)

==== Heat 1 ====
Rank	Athlete	Time	Notes
1	Li Ye (CHN)	41.889	QA
2	Ahn Hyun-soo (KOR)	41.966	QA
3	Kim Byeong-jun (KOR)	42.273	QB
4	Han Sang-guk (PRK)	42.639	QB

==== Heat 2 ====
Rank	Athlete	Time	Notes
1	Hu Ze (CHN)	42.559	QA
2	Song Kyung-taek (KOR)	42.645	QA
3	Liu Xiaoliang (CHN)	42.719	QB
4	Satoru Terao (JPN)	42.893	QB

=== Finals ===
==== Final B ====
Rank	Athlete	Time
1	Kim Byeong-jun (KOR)	43.208
2	Liu Xiaoliang (CHN)	43.420
—	Satoru Terao (JPN)	DSQ
—	Han Sang-guk (PRK)	DNS

==== Final A ====
Rank	Athlete	Time
1st place, gold medalist(s)	Hu Ze (CHN)	42.042
2nd place, silver medalist(s)	Song Kyung-taek (KOR)	42.167
3rd place, bronze medalist(s)	Li Ye (CHN)	56.119
—	Ahn Hyun-soo (KOR)	DSQ
