= Short-track speed skating at the 2007 Asian Winter Games – Men's 1500 metres =

Men's 1500 metres at the 2007 Asian Winter Games
- Venue: Wuhuan Gymnasium
- Dates: 29 January 2007
- Competitors: 20 from 7 nations

Medalists
gold medal	Sui Baoku	China
silver medal	Ahn Hyun-soo	South Korea
bronze medal	Li Ye	China

The men's 1500 meters at the 2007 Asian Winter Games was held on January 29, 2007 at Wuhuan Gymnasium, China.

== Schedule ==
All times are China Standard Time (UTC+08:00)

Date	Time	Event
Monday, 29 January 2007	18:50	Heats
Monday, 29 January 2007	19:30	Semifinals
Monday, 29 January 2007	20:00	Finals

== Results ==
Legend

- DNF — Did not finish
- DNS — Did not start

=== Heats ===
- Qualification: 1–3 → Semifinals (Q)

==== Heat 1 ====
Rank	Athlete	Time	Notes
1	Satoru Terao (JPN)	2:28.292	Q
2	Song Kyung-taek (KOR)	2:28.327	Q
3	Aslan Daumov (KAZ)	2:30.142	Q
4	Tsai Ping-yuan (TPE)	2:30.899	
5	Ganbatyn Mönkh-Amidral (MGL)	2:39.405	

==== Heat 2 ====
Rank	Athlete	Time	Notes
1	Li Ye (CHN)	2:43.549	Q
2	Junji Ito (JPN)	2:43.792	Q
3	Ro Sun-chol (PRK)	2:44.971	Q
4	Andrey Smetanin (KAZ)	2:54.732	
5	Liu Ming-hsien (TPE)	2:55.453	

==== Heat 3 ====
Rank	Athlete	Time	Notes
1	Ahn Hyun-soo (KOR)	2:35.516	Q
2	Liu Xiaoliang (CHN)	2:35.739	Q
3	Han Chol-min (PRK)	2:37.767	Q
4	Cheng Yi-lun (TPE)	2:38.546	
5	Artur Sultangaliyev (KAZ)	2:38.585	

==== Heat 4 ====
Rank	Athlete	Time	Notes
1	Lee Ho-suk (KOR)	2:32.124	Q
2	Sui Baoku (CHN)	2:32.451	Q
3	Shinichi Tagami (JPN)	2:32.466	Q
4	Ri Chol-song (PRK)	2:34.221	
—	Gantömöriin Mönkhdorj (MGL)	DNF	

=== Semifinals ===
- Qualification: 1–3 → Final A (QA), 4–6 → Final B (QB)

==== Heat 1 ====
Rank	Athlete	Time	Notes
1	Ahn Hyun-soo (KOR)	2:24.843	QA
2	Song Kyung-taek (KOR)	2:24.960	QA
3	Liu Xiaoliang (CHN)	2:25.261	QA
4	Satoru Terao (JPN)	2:26.853	QB
5	Aslan Daumov (KAZ)	2:31.123	QB
6	Ro Sun-chol (PRK)	2:35.376	QB

==== Heat 2 ====
Rank	Athlete	Time	Notes
1	Lee Ho-suk (KOR)	2:22.000	QA
2	Sui Baoku (CHN)	2:22.288	QA
3	Li Ye (CHN)	2:22.466	QA
4	Shinichi Tagami (JPN)	2:22.728	QB
5	Junji Ito (JPN)	2:23.584	QB
6	Han Chol-min (PRK)	2:28.463	QB

=== Finals ===
==== Final B ====
Rank	Athlete	Time
1	Satoru Terao (JPN)	2:21.918
2	Junji Ito (JPN)	2:22.239
3	Shinichi Tagami (JPN)	2:22.441
4	Aslan Daumov (KAZ)	2:26.328
—	Ro Sun-chol (PRK)	DNS
—	Han Chol-min (PRK)	DNS

==== Final A ====
Rank	Athlete	Time
1st place, gold medalist(s)	Sui Baoku (CHN)	2:20.590
2nd place, silver medalist(s)	Ahn Hyun-soo (KOR)	2:20.679
3rd place, bronze medalist(s)	Li Ye (CHN)	2:21.131
4	Song Kyung-taek (KOR)	2:21.133
5	Liu Xiaoliang (CHN)	2:23.847
6	Lee Ho-suk (KOR)	3:09.786
