= Short-track speed skating at the 2003 Asian Winter Games – Women's 3000 metre relay =

Women's 3000 metre relay at the 2003 Asian Winter Games
- Venue: Misawa Ice Arena
- Dates: 7 February 2003
- Competitors: 16 from 4 nations

Medalists
gold medal	South Korea; Joo Min-jin, Choi Eun-kyung, Kim Min-jee, Cho Ha-ri
silver medal	North Korea; Ri Hyang-mi, Jong Ok-myong, Mun Sun-ae, Yun Jong-suk
bronze medal	Japan; Ikue Teshigawara, Yuka Kamino, Mika Ozawa, Yoko Iizuka

The women's 3000 metre relay at the 2003 Asian Winter Games was held on February 7, 2003 at Misawa Ice Arena, Japan.

== Schedule ==
All times are Japan Standard Time (UTC+09:00)

Date	Time	Event
Friday, 7 February 2003	15:38	Final

== Results ==
Legend

- DNF — Did not finish

Rank	Team	Time
1st place, gold medalist(s)	South Korea (KOR); Joo Min-jin; Choi Eun-kyung; Kim Min-jee; Cho Ha-ri	4:26.759
2nd place, silver medalist(s)	North Korea (PRK); Ri Hyang-mi; Jong Ok-myong; Mun Sun-ae; Yun Jong-suk	4:27.326
3rd place, bronze medalist(s)	Japan (JPN); Ikue Teshigawara; Yuka Kamino; Mika Ozawa; Yoko Iizuka	4:28.485
—	China (CHN); Fu Tianyu; Wang Meng; Wang Chunlu; Yang Yang	DNF
