= Huang Yu-ting =

Taiwanese speed skater

Personal information
- Nationality: Republic of China (Taiwan)
- Born: 29 March 1988 (age 38) Kaohsiung, Taiwan
- Height: 1.70 m (5 ft 7 in)
- Weight: 55 kg (121 lb)

Sport
- Sport: Inline speed skating Short track speed skating Long track speed skating
Medal record
Women's Speed skating
Representing Chinese Taipei
Four Continents Championships
Gold medal – first place	2022 Calgary	1000m
Silver medal – second place	2022 Calgary	500m
Women's inline speed skating
Representing Chinese Taipei
The World Games
Gold medal – first place	2009 Kaohsiung	Track 300 m time trial
Gold medal – first place	2009 Kaohsiung	Track 500 m sprint
Gold medal – first place	2009 Kaohsiung	Track 1000 m sprint
Gold medal – first place	2013 Cali	Track 1000 m sprint
Bronze medal – third place	2013 Cali	Track 500 m sprint

Huang Yu-ting
- Traditional Chinese: 黃郁婷
- Simplified Chinese: 黄郁婷
Transcriptions
Standard Mandarin
- Hanyu Pinyin: Huáng Yùtíng
- IPA: [xwǎŋ ŷ tʰǐŋ]

Huang Yu-ting (Chinese: 黃郁婷; pinyin: Huáng Yùtíng; Mandarin pronunciation: [xwǎŋ ŷ tʰǐŋ]) is a Taiwanese speed skater who has competed in inline speed skating, short track speed skating, and long track speed skating. She was the flagbearer for the Chinese Taipei team at the Beijing 2022 Winter Olympic Games' opening ceremony.

As an inline speed skater, Huang won three gold medals at the 2009 World Games in Kaohsiung, Republic of China (Taiwan) representing the Chinese Taipei team: 300 m time trial, 500 m sprint, and 1000 m sprint. At the 2010 Asian Games, she competed in the women's 300 metres time trial and 500 metres sprint events. She won two medals at the 2013 World Games in Cali, Colombia: a gold in the 1000 m sprint and a bronze in the 500 m sprint.

In short track speed skating at the 2007 Asian Winter Games, Huang competed in the women's 500 metres, 1000 metres, 1500 metres, and 3000 metres relay events.

Huang competed as a long track speed skater at the 2018 Winter Olympics, in the women's 500 metres, 1000 metres, and 1500 metres events.

== Controversy ==
In early 2022, Huang garnered much cyberbullying after a video that she posted on 23 January, went viral of her wearing an outfit labeled "China" during practice, and she was later get bullied heavily by Taiwanese netizens, especially those with pan-green political views, which had flooded her Facebook and Instagram account with hate comments. In response, Huang claimed on Instagram that the outfit was a gift from an athlete on the Chinese team, whom she befriended in Germany. She also posted a Taylor Swift music video, "Shake It Off," which is famed for its lyrics, "Haters gonna hate, hate, hate, hate," and she wrote alongside the video, "My dear haters, this song is for you."

Huang later removed the video post due to the social media backlash afterwards. According to a translation by the South China Morning Post, Huang separately made a post on Facebook where she wrote, "Thank you to everyone who cheered me up...I have removed the video due to too many unnecessary private messages!...Sport is sport and in the world of sports, we do not differentiate between nationalities. After the Games, we all are good friends."

Ho Chih-wei, a Legislative Yuan member of the ruling Democratic Progressive Party (DPP) criticised Huang Yu-ting, calling her "brainless" and demanding that she "shut up", as well as supporting a law that would punish athletes such as Huang with bans from sport events. Taiwan Premier Su Tseng-chang from the ruling DPP called for an investigation and punishment for Huang. After initially claiming that it would not take any action against Huang, the Sports Administration announced on 3 March 2022 that it would suspend Huang's subsidies for training and competition for a two-year period.
