= Inline speed skating at the 2009 World Games – Women's 300 m time trial =

Inline speed skating – women's 300 m time trial at the 2009 World Games
- Venue: Yangming Skating Rink, Kaohsiung, Taiwan
- Date: 17 July 2009
- Competitors: 23 from 11 nations

Medalists
| gold medal | (Chinese Taipei) Huang Yu-ting |
| silver medal | (Chinese Taipei) Hsu Chiao-jen |
| bronze medal | (South Korea) Lim Jin-seon |

The women's 300 m time trial competition in inline speed skating at the 2009 World Games took place on 17 July 2009 at the Yangming Skating Rink in Kaohsiung, Taiwan.

== Competition format ==
A total of 23 athletes entered the competition. Best twelve athletes from preliminary round advances to the final.

== Results ==
=== Preliminary ===
| Rank | Athlete | Nation | Time | Note |
|---|---|---|---|---|
| 1 | Hsu Chiao-jen | Chinese Taipei | 27.798 | Q |
| 2 | Pan Yi-chin | Chinese Taipei | 27.986 | Q |
| 3 | Lim Jin-seon | South Korea | 28.041 | Q |
| 4 | Huang Yu-ting | Chinese Taipei | 28.056 | Q |
| 5 | Sara Sayasane | United States | 28.070 | Q |
| 6 | Yersi Puello | Colombia | 28.232 | Q |
| 7 | Carolina Santibañez Torres | Chile | 28.268 | Q |
| 8 | Erika Zanetti | Italy | 28.443 | Q |
| 9 | Bianca Roosenboom | Netherlands | 28.595 | Q |
| 10 | Estefania Cuervo | Colombia | 28.755 | Q |
| 11 | Desiree Contenti | Italy | 28.776 | Q |
| 12 | Sabine Berg | Germany | 29.015 | Q |
| 13 | Kim Mi-young | South Korea | 29.150 | |
| 14 | Jana Gegner | Germany | 29.194 | |
| 15 | Francesca Bettrone | Italy | 29.370 | |
| 16 | Sheila Posada | Spain | 29.506 | |
| 17 | Lisa Kaluzni | Germany | 29.716 | |
| | Woo Hyo-sook | South Korea | DNS | |
| | Kim Hye-mi | South Korea | DNS | |
| | Nadine Gloor | Switzerland | DNS | |
| | Sara Bak | Denmark | DNS | |
| | Stefanie Nuñez | Chile | DNS | |
| | Marta Ramírez | Colombia | DNS | |

=== Final ===
| Rank | Athlete | Nation | Time |
|---|---|---|---|
| 1st place, gold medalist(s) | Huang Yu-ting | Chinese Taipei | 27.670 |
| 2nd place, silver medalist(s) | Hsu Chiao-jen | Chinese Taipei | 27.676 |
| 3rd place, bronze medalist(s) | Lim Jin-seon | South Korea | 27.968 |
| 4 | Pan Yi-chin | Chinese Taipei | 28.214 |
| 5 | Yersi Puello | Colombia | 28.352 |
| 6 | Sara Sayasane | United States | 28.386 |
| 7 | Carolina Santibañez Torres | Chile | 28.437 |
| 8 | Desiree Contenti | Italy | 28.464 |
| 9 | Erika Zanetti | Italy | 28.493 |
| 10 | Estefania Cuervo | Colombia | 28.687 |
| 11 | Bianca Roosenboom | Netherlands | 28.771 |
| 12 | Sabine Berg | Germany | 28.804 |
