= Short-track speed skating at the 1999 Asian Winter Games – Women's 3000 metre relay =

Women's 3000 metre relay at the 1999 Asian Winter Games
- Venue: Yongpyong Dome
- Dates: 1 February 1999
- Competitors: 12 from 3 nations

Medalists
gold medal	South Korea; Choi Min-kyung, Kim Yun-mi, An Sang-mi, Kim Moon-jung
silver medal	Japan; Yuka Kamino, Chikage Tanaka, Atsuko Takata, Sayuri Yagi

The women's 3000 metre relay at the 1999 Asian Winter Games was held on February 1, 1999 at the Yongpyong Indoor Ice Rink, South Korea.

== Schedule ==
All times are Korea Standard Time (UTC+09:00)

Date	Time	Event
Monday, 1 February 1999	20:00	Final

== Results ==
Legend

- DSQ — Disqualified

Rank	Team	Time
1st place, gold medalist(s)	South Korea (KOR); Choi Min-kyung; Kim Yun-mi; An Sang-mi; Kim Moon-jung	4:27.840
2nd place, silver medalist(s)	Japan (JPN); Yuka Kamino; Chikage Tanaka; Atsuko Takata; Sayuri Yagi	4:28.330
—	China (CHN); Yang Yang; Yang Yang; Wang Chunlu; Sun Dandan	DSQ
