= Tom Plant (speed skater) =

American speed skater (born 1957)

Personal information
- Full name: Thomas John Plant
- Born: November 6, 1957 (age 68) Milwaukee, Wisconsin, U.S.

Sport
- Sport: Speed skating
Medal record
Men's speed skating
Representing the United States
World Sprint Championships
Bronze medal – third place	1980 West Allis	Sprint

Thomas John Plant (born November 6, 1957) is an American former speed skater.

He took part in 1980 Winter Games in Lake Placid, and won a bronze medal at the 1980 Sprint Championships.
