= Jong Kwang-bom =

North Korean short track speed skater (born 2001)

Personal information
- Nationality: North Korean
- Born: 29 July 2001 (age 24)
- Height: 1.76 m (5 ft 9 in)

Sport
- Country: North Korea
- Sport: Short track speed skating
- Coached by: Kim Sung-hee

Jong Kwang-bom (Korean: 정광범, born 29 July 2001) is a North Korean short track speed skater. He competed in the 2018 Winter Olympics.

In the 2018 Winter Olympics, Jong slipped in the start of the 500m heats and tripped over Japanese speed skater Keita Watanabe. Also after restarting the race, Jong bumped into Watanabe before tumbling on the ice.
