= 2007 World Short Track Speed Skating Championships =

The 2007 World Short Track Speed Skating Championships took place between 9 and 11 March 2007 in Milan, Italy. The World Championships were organised by the ISU which also run world cups and championships in speed skating and figure skating.

== Results ==
=== Men ===
Event	Gold		Silver		Bronze	
Overall*	Ahn Hyun-soo; South Korea	81 points	Charles Hamelin; Canada	63 points	Apolo Anton Ohno; United States	60 points
500 m	Charles Hamelin; Canada	41.449	François-Louis Tremblay; Canada	41.514	Ahn Hyun-soo; South Korea	41.625
1000 m	Ahn Hyun-soo; South Korea	1:27.177	Charles Hamelin; Canada	1:27.217	Apolo Anton Ohno; United States	1:27.465
1500 m	Apolo Anton Ohno; United States	2:33.793	Nicola Rodigari; Italy	2:33.841	Ahn Hyun-soo; South Korea	3:22.818
5000 m relay	South Korea; Ahn Hyun-soo; Kim Hyun-kon; Song Kyung-taek; Sung Si-bak; Kim Byeong-jun	6:55.399	Canada; Charles Hamelin; Olivier Jean; Jean-François Monette; François-Louis Tremblay	6:56.130	United States; Ryan Bedford; Travis Jayner; Jordan Malone; Apolo Anton Ohno; Anthony Lobello	6:58.702

* First place is awarded 34 points, second is awarded 21 points, third is awarded 13 points, fourth is awarded 8 points, fifth is awarded 5 points, sixth is awarded 3 points, seventh is awarded 2 points, and eighth is awarded 1 point in the finals of each individual race to determine the overall world champion. The relays do not count for the overall classification.

=== Women ===
Event	Gold		Silver		Bronze	
Overall*	Jin Sun-yu; South Korea	89 points (1st in 3000m)	Jung Eun-ju; South Korea	89 points (2nd in 3000m)	Kalyna Roberge; Canada	43 points
500 m	Kalyna Roberge; Canada	45.329	Arianna Fontana; Italy	45.394	Jung Eun-ju; South Korea	47.865
1000 m	Jin Sun-yu; South Korea	1:31.622	Jung Eun-ju; South Korea	1:31.777	Zhou Yang; China	1:31.810
1500 m	Jung Eun-ju; South Korea	2:22.303	Jin Sun-yu; South Korea	2:22.381	Byun Chun-sa; South Korea	2:22.520
3000 m relay	South Korea; Byun Chun-sa; Jeon Ji-soo; Jin Sun-yu; Jung Eun-ju; Kim Min-jung	4:14.450	China; Cheng Xiaolei; Fu Tianyu; Zhou Yang; Zhu Milei; Meng Xiaoxue	4:17.268	Canada; Anne Maltais; Amanda Overland; Annik Plamondon; Kalyna Roberge; Nita Avrith	4:18.748

* First place is awarded 34 points, second is awarded 21 points, third is awarded 13 points, fourth is awarded 8 points, fifth is awarded 5 points, sixth is awarded 3 points, seventh is awarded 2 points, and eighth is awarded 1 point in the finals of each individual race to determine the overall world champion. The relays do not count for the overall classification.

== Medal table ==
* Host nation (Italy)

Rank	Nation	Gold	Silver	Bronze	Total
1	South Korea	7	3	4	14
2	Canada	2	4	2	8
3	United States	1	0	3	4
4	Italy*	0	2	0	2
5	China	0	1	1	2
Totals (5 entries)		10	10	10	30
