= Andy Roesch =

Andy Roesch (1906-1977) was a champion speed skater in the 1920s.

Roesch was born in Smithtown, New York in 1906, son of Main Street, Smithtown barbershop owner Andrew Roesch and his wife, Johanna Roesch.

== Races ==
He won a three-mile race on Hessian Pond in New York in February 1927. He was a member of the first United States Speed Skating Team In 1929 he won the New York Silver Skates finishing the two-mile course in 6:52.

Roesch was nominated for the 1936 Olympics. He lost his amateur status, however, when he took a job teaching figure skating at the Brooklyn Ice Palace.

== Later life ==
Roesch became a welder at the Jakobson Shipyard in Oyster Bay. In September 1976, at age 70, he fell while skating on a local pond and broke his neck. He died in 1977 in Newton, Massachusetts after spending time at the New England Spinal Cord Rehabilitation Center.

== Additional sources ==
- Chicago Daily News almanac listing of Roesch
