= Zhu Mile =

Former Chinese female short track speed skater

Personal information
- Nationality: Chinese
- Born: 24 August 1984 (age 41) Jilin, China

Sport
- Sport: Short track speed skating
Medal record
Women's short track speed skating
Representing China
World Championships
Gold medal – first place	2006 Minneapolis	3000 m relay
Silver medal – second place	2007 Milan	3000 m relay
World Team Championships
Silver medal – second place	2004 St. Petersburg	Team
Silver medal – second place	2005 Chuncheon	Team
Silver medal – second place	2006 Montreal	Team
Silver medal – second place	2007 Budapest	Team
Asian Winter Games
Gold medal – first place	2007 Changchun	3000 m relay
Bronze medal – third place	2007 Changchun	500 m
Universiade
Gold medal – first place	2003 Tarvisio	3000 m
Silver medal – second place	2003 Tarvisio	1500 m
Silver medal – second place	2003 Tarvisio	3000 m relay
Silver medal – second place	2005 Innsbruck	500 m
Bronze medal – third place	2005 Innsbruck	3000 m relay
World Junior Championships
Silver medal – second place	2002 Chuncheon	3000 m relay
Silver medal – second place	2004 Beijing	3000 m relay

Zhu Mile is a former Chinese female short track speed skater. She is a World champion and a World silver medallist, four-time silver medallist of the World Team Championships, champion and a bronze medallist of the 2007 Asian Winter Games as well as champion and multiple medallist of the Winter Universiade. She was a reserve athlete in the Chinese team at the 2006 Winter Olympics.

During her World Cup career, Zhu Mi Lei achieved four relay victories, five personal and four relay silver podiums as well as two personal bronze podiums. Her first personal World Cup podium was during the 2003–04 season when she finished second in 500 m in Calgary. Her last personal podium was during the 2006–07 season.
