= Eduard Matusevich =

Soviet speed skater

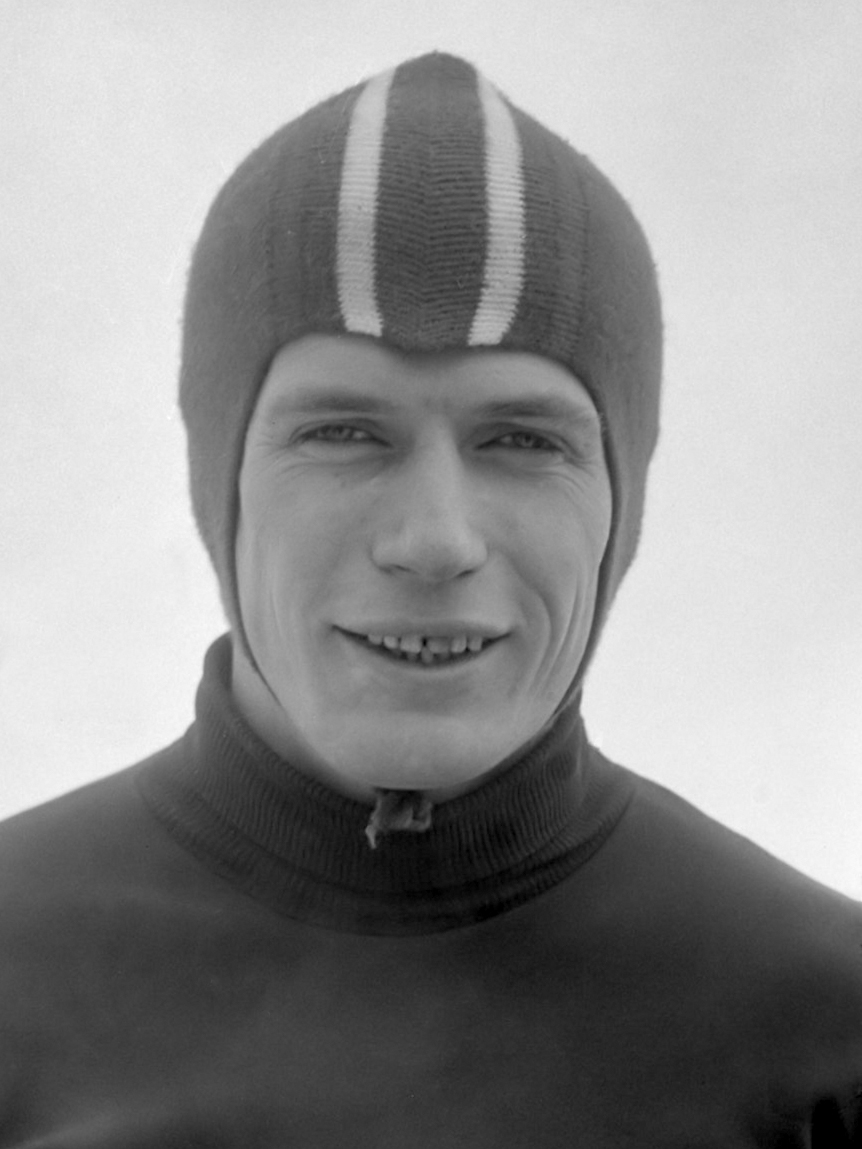
- Eduard Matusevich in 1966

Personal information
- Born: 16 November 1937 (age 88) Minsk, Belarusian SSR, Soviet Union
- Height: 1.89 m (6 ft 2 in)
- Weight: 87 kg (192 lb)

Sport
- Sport: Speed skating
- Club: Dynamo Minsk
Medal record
Representing the Soviet Union
European Speed Skating Championships
| Gold medal – first place | 1965 Gothenburg | All-round |
| Bronze medal – third place | 1967 Lahti | All-round |
| Silver medal – second place | 1968 Oslo | All-round |

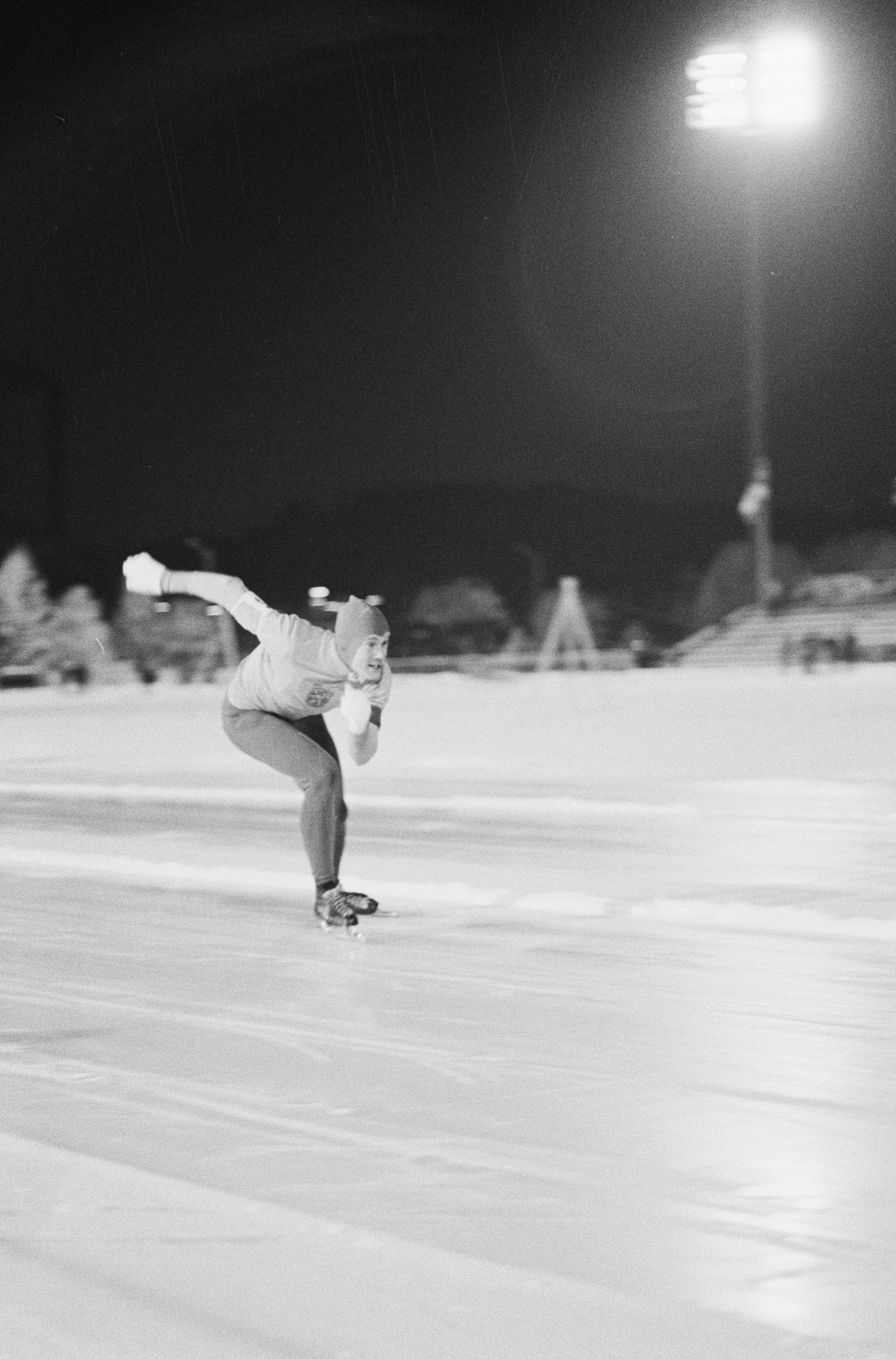
Matusevich competing on 5000 m during the 1967 European Championships in Lathi, Finland

Eduard Antonovich Matusevich (Belarusian: Эдуард Антонавіч Матусевіч; born 16 November 1937) is a retired Soviet speed skater who won a gold, a bronze and a silver medal at the European championships in 1965, 1967 and 1968, respectively. He competed at the 1964 and 1968 Winter Olympics in the 1,500 m event and finished in sixth and eighth place, respectively. He was all-round national champion in 1964–1966 and 1966 and won five individual titles in 1963–1966.

His personal bests were

- 500 m – 40.6 (1968)
- 1500 m – 2:04.5 (1968)
- 5000 m – 7:35.1 (1965)
- 10000 m – 15:43.6 (1968)
