= Han Sang-guk =

North Korean speed skater (born 1978)

Personal information
- Nationality: North Korean
- Born: 2 November 1978 (age 46)

Sport
- Sport: Short track speed skating

Han Sang-guk (born 2 November 1978) is a North Korean short track speed skater. He competed in two events at the 1998 Winter Olympics.
