= Hu Ze =

Chinese short track speed skater

Personal information
- Born: 7 September 1984 (age 41)
Medal record
Men's short track speed skating
Representing China
Asian Games
Gold medal – first place	2007 Changchun	500 m
Silver medal – second place	2007 Changchun	5000 m relay

Hu Ze (Chinese: 胡澤; born 7 September 1984) is a former Chinese short track speed skater. He is a champion and silver medallist of the 2007 Asian Winter Games. He briefly competed at the World Cup, achieving two personal podiums and one team victory during the 2006–07 season.
