= Satoshi Sakashita =

Short track speed skater (born 1989)

Personal information
- Born: December 20, 1989 (age 36) Atsugi, Japan
- Height: 178 cm (5 ft 10 in)
- Weight: 74 kg (163 lb)

Sport
- Country: Japan
- Sport: Short track speed skating
- Coached by: Takehiro Kodera
Medal record
Men's short track speed skating
Representing Japan
Asian Winter Games
Bronze medal – third place	2007 Changchun	5000 m Relay
World Championships
Bronze medal – third place	2009 Vienna	5000 m Relay

Satoshi Sakashita (坂下 里士, Sakashita Satoshi; born 20 December 1989 in Atsugi) is a Japanese male short track speed skater.
