= Kim Hyun-kon =

South Korean speed skater

Medal record

Men's short track speed skating

Representing South Korea

World Short Track Championships
Gold medal – first place	2004 Gothenburg	5000 m relay
Gold medal – first place	2004 St. Petersberg	Team
Gold medal – first place	2007 Milan	5000 m relay
Silver medal – second place	2007 Budapest	Team

Asian Winter Games
Gold medal – first place	2007 Jangchun	5000 m relay
Silver medal – second place	2007 Jangchun	1000 m

World Junior Championships
Silver medal – second place	2003 Budapest	Overall
Silver medal – second place	2005 Belgrade	Overall

Kim Hyun-Kon (Korean: 김현곤; Hanja: 金炫坤, born October 22, 1985, in Seoul) is a South Korean short track speed skater.
