= Sui Baoku =

Chinese speed skater

Personal information
- Born: 25 April 1986 (age 40) Changchun, Jilin, China
Medal record
Men's short track speed skating
Representing China
World Championships
Silver medal – second place	2004 Gothenburg	5000 m relay
Silver medal – second place	2006 Minneapolis	5000 m relay
Silver medal – second place	2009 Vienna	5000 m relay
World Team Championships
Bronze medal – third place	2003 Sofia	Team
Bronze medal – third place	2005 Chuncheon	Team
Bronze medal – third place	2006 Montreal	Team

Sui Baoku (born 25 April 1986) is a Chinese short track speed skater. He competed in the men's 5000 metre relay event at the 2006 Winter Olympics.
