= Yun Jong-suk =

North Korean speed skater (born 1986)

Personal information
- Nationality: North Korean
- Born: 21 December 1986 (age 38)

Sport
- Sport: Short track speed skating

Yun Jong-suk (Korean: 윤정숙; born 21 December 1986) is a North Korean short track speed skater. She competed in the women's 500 metres event at the 2006 Winter Olympics.
