= Kim Byeong-jun (speed skater) =

South Korean short track speed skater

Kim Byeong-Jun
Personal information
- Born: February 8, 1988 (age 38) Seoul, South Korea
Medal record
Men's short track speed skating
Representing South Korea
World Championships
Gold medal – first place	2007 Milan	5000 m relay
World Team Championships
Silver medal – second place	2007 Budapest	Team
Asian Winter Games
Gold medal – first place	2011 Astana-Almaty	5000 m relay
Gold medal – first place	2007 Jangchun	5000 m relay

Kim Byeong-Jun (Korean: 김병준; Hanja: 金秉俊; born February 8, 1988, in Seoul) is a South Korean short track speed skater.
