= Zhou Yang (speed skater) =

Chinese short track speed skater

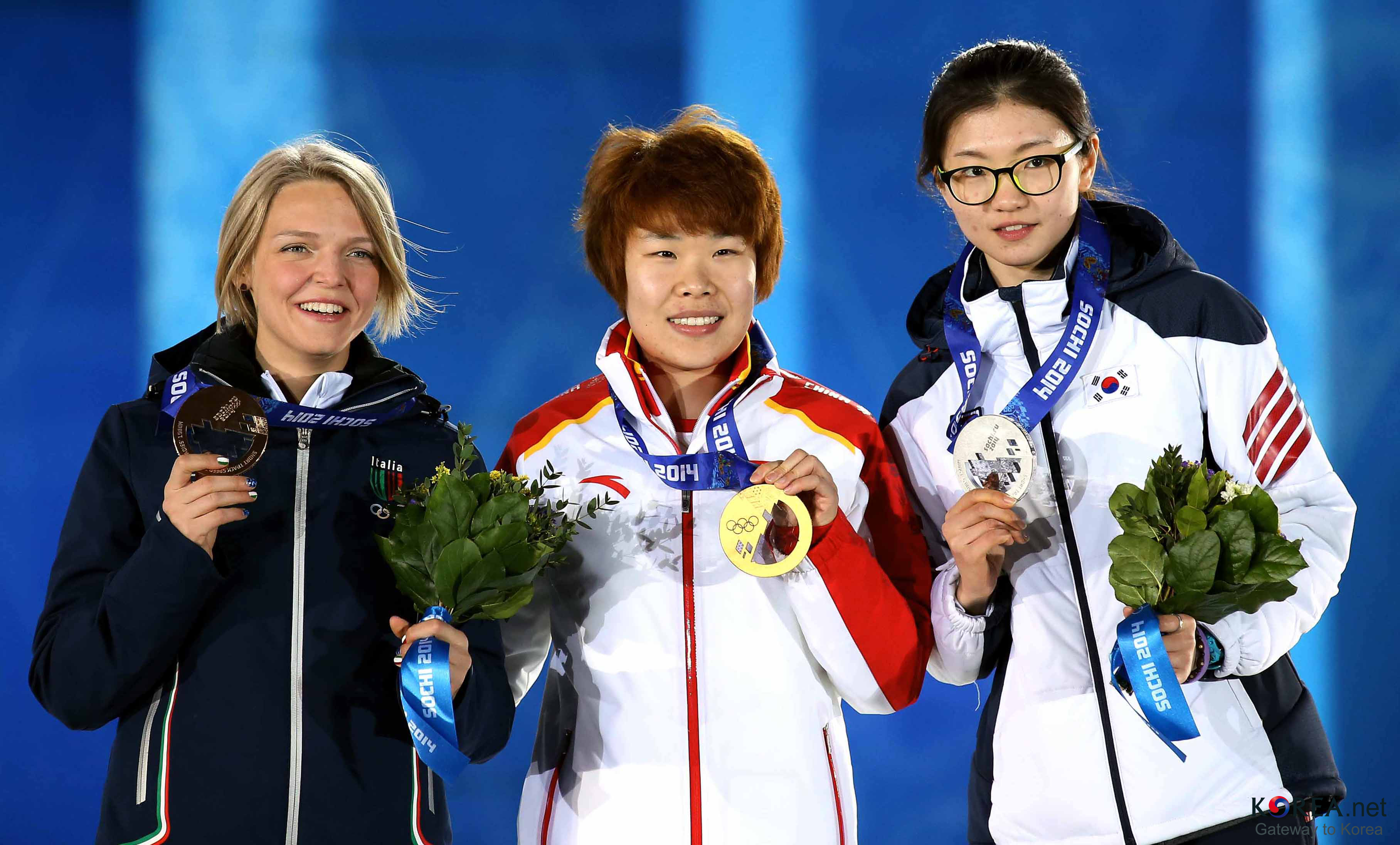
- Zhou Yang (middle) won the gold medal in Ladies' 1500 meters in 2014 Winter Olympics

Personal information
- Born: June 9, 1991 (age 35) Changchun, Jilin
- Height: 1.65 m (5 ft 5 in)
- Weight: 57 kg (126 lb)

Sport
- Country: China
- Sport: Short Track Speed Skating

Achievements and titles
- Personal best(s): 500m: 43.992 (2010); 1000m: 1:29.049 (2010); 1500m: 2:16.729 (2008, WR); 3000m: 4:58.955 (2009)
Medal record
Women's short track speed skating
Representing China
Event	1st	2nd	3rd
Olympic Games	3	0	0
World Championships	4	5	5
Asian Games	2	0	0
Olympic Games
Gold medal – first place	2010 Vancouver	1500m
Gold medal – first place	2010 Vancouver	3000m Relay
Gold medal – first place	2014 Sochi	1500m
World Championships
Gold medal – first place	2008 Gangneung	3000m
Gold medal – first place	2009 Vienna	3000m
Gold medal – first place	2009 Vienna	3000m Relay
Gold medal – first place	2013 Debrecen	3000m Relay
Silver medal – second place	2007 Milan	3000m Relay
Silver medal – second place	2008 Gangneung	Overall
Silver medal – second place	2008 Gangneung	1000m
Silver medal – second place	2009 Vienna	1500m
Silver medal – second place	2015 Moscow	3000 m relay
Bronze medal – third place	2007 Milan	1000m
Bronze medal – third place	2007 Milan	3000m
Bronze medal – third place	2008 Gangneung	1500m
Bronze medal – third place	2008 Gangneung	3000m Relay
Bronze medal – third place	2009 Vienna	Overall
Asian Winter Games
Gold medal – first place	2007 Changchun	3000 m relay
Gold medal – first place	2011 Astana-Almaty	3000 m relay

Zhou Yang (Chinese: 周洋; pinyin: Zhōu Yáng; Mandarin pronunciation: [ʈʂóʊ jǎŋ]; born 9 June 1991) is a female Chinese short track speed skater. She won the gold medal in the 1500 m event at the 2010 Winter Olympics. She also won the gold medal in 1500m event at 2014 Sochi Olympics. Zhou added another gold medal on the Chinese 3000 m relay team. She set a new world and Olympic record in the 1,000 m semifinal. She was bestowed the honour of the national flag bearer for China at the 2018 Winter Olympics in PyeongChang, South Korea as China's most decorated active winter Olympian with 3 gold medals from previous Olympics, after Yang Yang and Wang Meng who have retired from the sport.

== Early life ==
Zhou Yang started skating at age eight. A speed skating coach noticed that she had potential in the sport.

In the 2008 World Short Track Speed Skating Championships, Zhou Yang won the gold medal in the women's 3000 meter super final. Zhou was also ranked second overall, following another Chinese skater Wang Meng.

Olympic Games
Preceded by Tong Jian	Flagbearer for China; Pyeongchang 2018	Succeeded by Zhao Dan; Gao Tingyu
