= Hong Kong at the 2007 Asian Winter Games =

- IOC code: HKG
- NOC: Sports Federation and Olympic Committee of Hong Kong, China

in Changchun
- Competitors: 26
- Medals Ranked 7th: Gold 0 Silver 0 Bronze 0 Total 0

Asian Winter Games appearances
- 1986; 1990; 1996; 1999; 2003; 2007; 2011; 2017; 2025; 2029

Hong Kong, also known as Hong Kong, China, participated in the 2007 Asian Winter Games held in Changchun, China from January 28, 2007 to February 4, 2007.
