= Jeon Ji-soo =

South Korean short track speed skater

Medal record

Women's short track speed skating

Representing South Korea

World Championships
Gold medal – first place	2015 Moscow	3000 m relay
Gold medal – first place	2007 Milano	3000 m relay
Gold medal – first place	2007 Budapest	Team

World Junior Championships
Silver medal – second place	2005 Belgrade	Overall
Gold medal – first place	2005 Belgrade	1000 m
Silver medal – second place	2005 Belgrade	1500 m s-final

Winter Universiade
Gold medal – first place	2011 Erzurum	3000 m relay

Asian Winter Games
Silver medal – second place	2007 Changchun	3000 m relay

Jeon Ji-Soo (Korean: 전지수; Hanja: 全志秀; born December 13, 1985) is a South Korean short track speed skater.

Jeon first gained attention at the 2005 World Junior Short Track Speed Skating Championships in Belgrade, where she won overall runner-up and a gold medal in the 1000 metres.

In 2007, Jeon was selected for the South Korea national team and competed in the World Championships and World Team Championships as a member of the 3000 metre relay squad, where she won gold medals in both events.

In 2011, Jeon was again called up to the South Korea national team, ranked first overall in the 500 metres of the 2010-11 national season. She earned a gold medal in the 3000 metre relay event at the 2011 Winter Universiade held in Erzurum, Turkey.

She currently belongs to the Gangneung City Government short track speed skating team.
