= Ayuko Ito =

Japanese short-track speed-skater (born 1986)

Personal information
- Born: 29 September 1986 (age 39) Hamamatsu, Japan
- Height: 5 ft 3 in (160 cm)
- Weight: 119 lb (54 kg)

Sport
- Country: Japan
- Sport: Short track speed skating

Achievements and titles
- World finals: 2
- Highest world ranking: 8 (1000m)
Medal record
World Championships
Bronze medal – third place	2013 Debrecen	3000 m relay
Bronze medal – third place	2017 Rotterdam	3000 m relay

Ayuko Ito (伊藤 亜由子, Itō Ayuko; born 29 September 1986) is a Japanese short-track speed-skater.

Ito competed at the 2010 Winter Olympics for Japan. She finished third in her opening round race of the 1000 metres, failing to advance and placing 18th. She was also a member of the 3000 metre relay team, which finished third in the semifinals and fourth in the B Final, ending up seventh overall.

As of 2013, Ito has won one bronze medal at the World Championships, as a member of the Japanese relay team in 2013. Her best individual result is 9th, in the 2012 1500 metres.

As of 2013, Ito has ten ISU Short Track Speed Skating World Cup podium finishes, all as part of the Japanese relay team. Her best result is a silver medal, achieved three times. Her best World Cup ranking is eighth, in the 1000 metres in 2011–12.

She also competed in the 2014 Winter Olympics and the 2018 Winter Olympics.

== World Cup podiums ==
Date	Season	Location	Rank	Event
28 October 2007	2007–08	Kobe	3rd place, bronze medalist(s)	3000m Relay
27 September 2009	2008–09	Seoul	2nd place, silver medalist(s)	3000m Relay
30 October 2011	2011–12	Saguenay	3rd place, bronze medalist(s)	3000m Relay
4 December 2011	2011–12	Nagoya	2nd place, silver medalist(s)	3000m Relay
11 December 2011	2011–12	Shanghai	3rd place, bronze medalist(s)	3000m Relay
12 February 2012	2011–12	Dordrecht	3rd place, bronze medalist(s)	3000m Relay
21 October 2012	2012–13	Calgary	3rd place, bronze medalist(s)	3000m Relay
28 October 2012	2012–13	Montreal	3rd place, bronze medalist(s)	3000m Relay
2 December 2012	2012–13	Nagoya	3rd place, bronze medalist(s)	3000m Relay
9 December 2012	2012–13	Shanghai	2nd place, silver medalist(s)	3000m Relay
