= Ri Hyang-mi =

North Korean speed skater

Medal record

Short track speed skating

Representing North Korea

Asian Winter Games
Silver medal – second place	2003 Aomori	3000 m relay
Bronze medal – third place	2003 Aomori	500 m

- Ri Hyang-mi
- Hangul: 리향미
- RR: Ri Hyangmi
- MR: Ri Hyangmi

Ri Hyang-mi (born August 15, 1985) is a North Korean short track speed skater. She won an individual bronze medal at short track at the 2003 Winter Asian Games. She was a competitor at the 2006 Winter Olympics in Torino.
