= South Korea at the 2007 Asian Winter Games =

- IOC code: KOR
- NOC: Korean Olympic Committee

in Changchun
- Competitors: 116
- Medals Ranked 3rd: Gold 9 Silver 13 Bronze 11 Total 33

Asian Winter Games appearances (overview)
- 1986; 1990; 1996; 1999; 2003; 2007; 2011; 2017; 2025; 2029

South Korea, IOC designation:Korea, participated in the 2007 Asian Winter Games held in Changchun, China, from 28 January to 4 February 2007.

== Medal summary ==
=== Medal table ===
Sport	Gold	Silver	Bronze	Total
Short track speed skating	4	5	2	11
Speed skating	3	5	5	13
Curling	2	0	0	2
Alpine skiing	0	3	3	6
Ice hockey	0	0	1	1
Totals (5 entries)	9	13	11	33

=== Medalists ===
==== Gold ====
Curling

- Men – Lee Je-ho, Beak Jong-chul, Yang Se-young, Kwon Young-il, Park Kwon-il
- Women – Jeong Jin-sook, Kim Ji-suk, Park Mi-hee, Lee Hye-in, Ju Yun-hoa

Short track speed skating

- Men's 1000 m – Ahn Hyun-soo
- Men's 5000 m relay – Ahn Hyun-soo, Kim Byung-joon, Kim Hyun-gon, Lee Ho-suk, Song Kyung-taek
- Women's 1000 m – Jin Sun-yu
- Women's 1500 m – Jung Eun-ju

Speed skating

- Men's 500 m – Lee Kang-seok
- Men's 1000 m – Lee Kyou-hyuk
- Men's 1500 m – Lee Kyou-hyuk

==== Silver ====
Alpine skiing

- Men's slalom – Gang Min-hyeok
- Men's giant slalom – Gang Min-hyeok
- Women's giant slalom – Oh Jae-eun

Short track speed skating

- Men's 500 m – Song Kyung-taek
- Men's 1000 m – Kim Hyun-gon
- Men's 1500 m – Ahn Hyun-soo
- Women's 1500 m – Jin Sun-yu
- Women's 3000 m relay – Byun Chun-sa, Jeon Ji-soo, Jin Sun-yu, Jung Eun-ju, Kim Min-jung

Speed skating

- Men's 500 m – Lee Kyou-hyuk
- Men's 1000 m – Mun Jun
- Men's 5000 m – Yeo Sang-yeop
- Women's 500 m – Lee Sang-hwa
- Women's 1500 m – Lee Ju-yeon

==== Bronze ====
Alpine skiing

- Men's giant slalom – Kim Woo-sung
- Women's slalom – Oh Jae-eun
- Women's giant slalom – Kim Sun-joo

Ice hockey

- Men – Choi Jung-sik, Hong Hyun-mook, Hwang Byung-wook, Jeon Jin-ho, Kim Han-sung, Kim Hong-il, Kim Ki-sung, Kim Kyung-tae, Kim Kyu-heon, Kim Yoon-hwan, Lee Kwon-jae, Lee Kwon-jun, Lee Myung-woo, Lee Yong-jun, Oh Hyun-ho, Park Joon-won, Park Sung-min, Park Woo-sang, Seo Sin-il, Son Ho-sung, Um Hyun-seung, Yoon Kyung-won

Short track speed skating

- Women's 500 m – Byun Chun-sa
- Women's 1000 m – Jung Eun-ju

Speed skating

- Men's 100 m – Lee Kang-seok
- Men's 1000 m – Choi Jae-bong
- Men's 1500 m – Mun Jun
- Women's 100 m – Lee Sang-hwa
- Women's 1000 m – Kim Yoo-rim

== Participation details ==
=== Alpine skiing ===
Men

Name	Event	Final	
Name	Event	Time	Rank
Gang Min-hyeok	Giant slalom	2:09.93	Silver
Gang Min-hyeok	Slalom	1:48.54	Silver
Kim Woo-sung	Giant slalom	2:10.79	Bronze
Kim Woo-sung	Slalom	1:50.65	6th
Ahn Sung-joon	Giant slalom	2:12.45	7th
Ahn Sung-joon	Slalom	2:03.34	20th
Kim Min-jung	Giant slalom	2:13.44	8th
Kim Min-jung	Slalom	1:50.87	7th

Women

Name	Event	Final	
Name	Event	Time	Rank
Oh Jae-eun	Giant slalom	2:09.64	Silver
Oh Jae-eun	Slalom	1:27.77	Bronze
Kim Seon-ju	Giant slalom	2:11.80	Bronze
Kim Seon-ju	Slalom	1:32.74	5th
Kim Ye-seul	Giant slalom	2:14.20	6th
Kim Ye-seul	Slalom	1:32.74	9th

=== Short track speed skating ===
Men

Name	Event	Final	
Name	Event	Time	Rank
Ahn Hyun-soo	500 m	Disqualified	
Ahn Hyun-soo	1000 m	1:29.085	Gold
Ahn Hyun-soo	1500 m	2:20.679	Silver
Kim Byung-joon	500 m	43.208	4th
Kim Byung-joon	1000 m	2:24.411	7th
Song Kyung-taek	500 m	42.167	Silver
Song Kyung-taek	1500 m	2:21.133	4th
Kim Hyun-gon	1000 m	1:29.163	Silver
Lee Ho-suk	1500 m	3:09.786	6th
Ahn Hyun-soo; Lee Ho-suk; Kim Hyun-gon; Song Kyung-taek; Kim Byung-joon	5000 m relay	6:44.839	Gold

Women

Name	Event	Final	
Name	Event	Time	Rank
Byun Chun-sa	500 m	45.278	Bronze
Byun Chun-sa	1000 m	1:34.503	5th
Byun Chun-sa	1500 m	Disqualified	
Jeon Ji-soo	500 m	44.645	5th
Kim Min-jung	500 m	45.623	6th
Jin Sun-yu	1000 m	1:33.042	Gold
Jin Sun-yu	1500 m	2:24.124	Silver
Jung Eun-ju	1000 m	1:33.143	Bronze
Jung Eun-ju	1500 m	2:24.089	Gold
Byun Chun-sa; Jeon Ji-soo; Kim Min-jung; Jin Sun-yu; Jung Eun-ju	3000 m relay	4:13.391	Silver

=== Speed skating ===
Men

Name	Event	Final	
Name	Event	Time	Rank
Lee Kang-seok	100 m	9.69	Bronze
Lee Kang-seok	500 m	70.30	Gold
Kwon Soon-chun	100 m	10.50	9th
Lee Ki-ho	100 m	10.30	8th
Lee Ki-ho	500 m	71.11	6th
Lee Kyou-hyuk	500 m	70.50	Silver
Lee Kyou-hyuk	1000 m	1:09.86	Gold
Lee Kyou-hyuk	1500 m	1:49.13	Gold
Choi Jae-bong	500 m	72.11	12th
Choi Jae-bong	1000 m	1:10.92	Bronze
Choi Jae-bong	1500 m	1:50.21	4th
Mun Jun	1000 m	1:10.45	Silver
Mun Jun	1500 m	1:49.79	Bronze
Lee Jong-woo	1000 m	1:11.86	6th
Lee Jong-woo	1500 m	3:00.22	15th
Yeo Sang-yeop	5000 m	6:43.34	Silver
Choi Keun-won	5000 m	6:43.86	4th
Ko Byung-wook	5000 m	6:54.23	8th

Women

Name	Event	Final	
Name	Event	Time	Rank
Lee Sang-hwa	100 m	10.59	Bronze
Lee Sang-hwa	500 m	80.78	11th
Lee Sang-hwa	1000 m	1:19.24	5th
Choi Seung-yong	100 m	10.96	8th
Choi Seung-yong	500 m	79.91	8th
Choi Seung-yong	1000 m	1:20.92	12th
Oh Min-ji	100 m	11.00	10th
Lee Bo-ra	100 m	11.03	11th
Lee Bo-ra	500 m	80.78	11th
Kim Yoo-rim	500 m	80.06	9th
Kim Yoo-rim	1000 m	1:18.96	Bronze
Wang Hee-ji	1000 m	1:20.52	11th
Lee Ju-yeon	1500 m	2:01.60	Silver
Lee Ju-yeon	3000 m	4:18.57	4th
Noh Seon-yeong	1500 m	2:02.80	4th
Noh Seon-yeong	3000 m	4:18.57	5th
Baek Eun-bi	1500 m	2:05.01	9th
Lee So-yeon	1500 m	2:06.80	12th
Lee So-yeon	3000 m	4:27.81	9th
