= Song Kyung-taek =

South Korean speed skater

Personal information
- Born: 10 July 1983 (age 43)

Sport
- Country: South Korea
- Sport: Short track speed skating
Medal record
Men's short track speed skating
Representing South Korea
World Championships
Gold medal – first place	2008 Gangneung	1500 m
Gold medal – first place	2008 Gangneung	5000 m relay
Gold medal – first place	2007 Milan	3000 m
Gold medal – first place	2007 Milan	5000 m relay
Silver medal – second place	2005 Beijing	5000 m relay
Bronze medal – third place	2008 Gangneung	Overall
Bronze medal – third place	2008 Gangneung	500 m
Bronze medal – third place	2008 Gangneung	1000 m
World Team Championships
Silver medal – second place	2007 Budapest	Team
Silver medal – second place	2005 Chuncheon	Team
Bronze medal – third place	2008 Harbin	Team
Asian Winter Games
Gold medal – first place	2007 Changchun	5000 m relay
Silver medal – second place	2007 Changchun	500 m
Winter Universiade
Gold medal – first place	2003 Tarvisio	1500 m
Gold medal – first place	2003 Tarvisio	5000 m relay

Song Kyung-Taek (Korean: 송경택; Hanja: 宋炅澤, born 10 July 1983) is a South Korean short track speed skater. He won four gold medals at the World Championships.

Song currently belongs to the Goyang City Hall short track speed skating team along with 2009 World Champion Lee Ho-Suk.
