= Jung Eun-ju =

South Korean speed skater

Personal information
- Born: September 30, 1988 (age 37)
Medal record
Women's short track speed skating
Representing South Korea
World Championships
Gold medal – first place	2007 Milano	1500 m
Gold medal – first place	2007 Milano	3000 m relay
Gold medal – first place	2007 Budapest	Team
Gold medal – first place	2008 Gangreung	3000 m relay
Silver medal – second place	2007 Milano	Overall
Silver medal – second place	2007 Milano	1000 m
Silver medal – second place	2007 Milano	3000 m
Silver medal – second place	2008 Gangreung	3000 m
Silver medal – second place	2008 Harbin	Team
Bronze medal – third place	2007 Milano	500 m
World Junior Championships
Gold medal – first place	2006 Miercurea-Ciuc	Overall
Gold medal – first place	2006 Miercurea-Ciuc	500m
Gold medal – first place	2006 Miercurea-Ciuc	1000m
Gold medal – first place	2006 Miercurea-Ciuc	1500m
Gold medal – first place	2004 Beijing	1500m
Gold medal – first place	2004 Beijing	1500mSF
Silver medal – second place	2004 Beijing	Overall
Bronze medal – third place	2006 Miercurea-Ciuc	1500mSF
Asian Winter Games
Gold medal – first place	2007 Jangchun	1500 m
Silver medal – second place	2007 Jangchun	3000 m relay
Bronze medal – third place	2007 Jangchun	1000 m

Jung Eun-ju (Korean: 정은주; Hanja: 鄭恩朱, born September 30, 1988) is a South Korean short track speed skater. She is the World Record holder for 3000 m.
