= Byun Chun-sa =

Short-track speed skater

Medal record

Women's short track speed skating

Representing South Korea

Olympic Games
Gold medal – first place	2006 Turin	3000 m relay

World Championships
Gold medal – first place	2004 Göteborg	3000 m
Gold medal – first place	2004 Göteborg	3000 m relay
Gold medal – first place	2007 Milan	3000 m relay
Silver medal – second place	2004 Göteborg	1000 m
Bronze medal – third place	2004 Göteborg	Overall
Bronze medal – third place	2007 Milan	1500 m

World Junior Championships
Gold medal – first place	2003 Budapest	Overall

Asian Winter Games
Silver medal – second place	2007 Changchun	3000 m Relay
Bronze medal – third place	2007 Changchun	500 m

- Byun Chun-sa
- Hangul: 변천사
- RR: Byeon Cheonsa
- MR: Pyŏn Ch'ŏnsa

Byun Chun-sa (Korean: 변천사; born November 23, 1987, in Seoul) is a South Korean short track speed skater who won gold in the 3000m relay at the 2006 Winter Olympics.
