= Yuka Kamino =

Japanese speed skater (born 1980)

Personal information
- Nationality: Japanese
- Born: 8 December 1980 (age 45) Higashiōsaka, Osaka, Japan

Sport
- Sport: Short track speed skating

Yuka Kamino (神野 由佳, Kamino Yuka; born 8 December 1980) is a Japanese short track speed skater. She competed at the 2002 Winter Olympics and the 2006 Winter Olympics.
