= Changchun Wuhuan Gymnasium =

Indoor arena in Changchun, China

Coordinates: 43°52′0″N 125°20′21″E

The Changchun Wuhuan Gymnasium is an indoor arena in Changchun, China. The arena used mainly for indoor sports. The facility has a capacity of 11,428 people and was opened in 1994. It hosted the short-track speed skating and figure skating as well as the opening and closing ceremonies for the 2007 Asian Winter Games.

== See also ==
- Sports in China
