= Chinese Taipei at the 2007 Asian Winter Games =

- IOC code: TPE
- NOC: Chinese Taipei Olympic Committee

in Changchun
- Competitors: 10 in 1 sport

Asian Winter Games appearances
- 1990; 1996; 1999; 2003; 2007; 2011; 2017; 2025; 2029

Flag of the Republic of China

Chinese Taipei is the designated Olympic name for the Republic of China, alternatively known as Taiwan participated in the 2007 Asian Winter Games held in Changchun, China from January 28, 2007 to February 4, 2007.
