= North Korea at the 2007 Asian Winter Games =

- IOC code: PRK
- NOC: Olympic Committee of the Democratic People's Republic of Korea

in Changchun
- Competitors: 66

Asian Winter Games appearances
- 1986; 1990; 1996–1999; 2003; 2007; 2011; 2017; 2025; 2029

North Korea, IOC designation: Democratic People's Republic of Korea, participated in the 2007 Asian Winter Games held in Changchun, China, from January 28, 2007, to February 4, 2007.
