= Short-track speed skating =

Competitive skating on an ice hockey rink

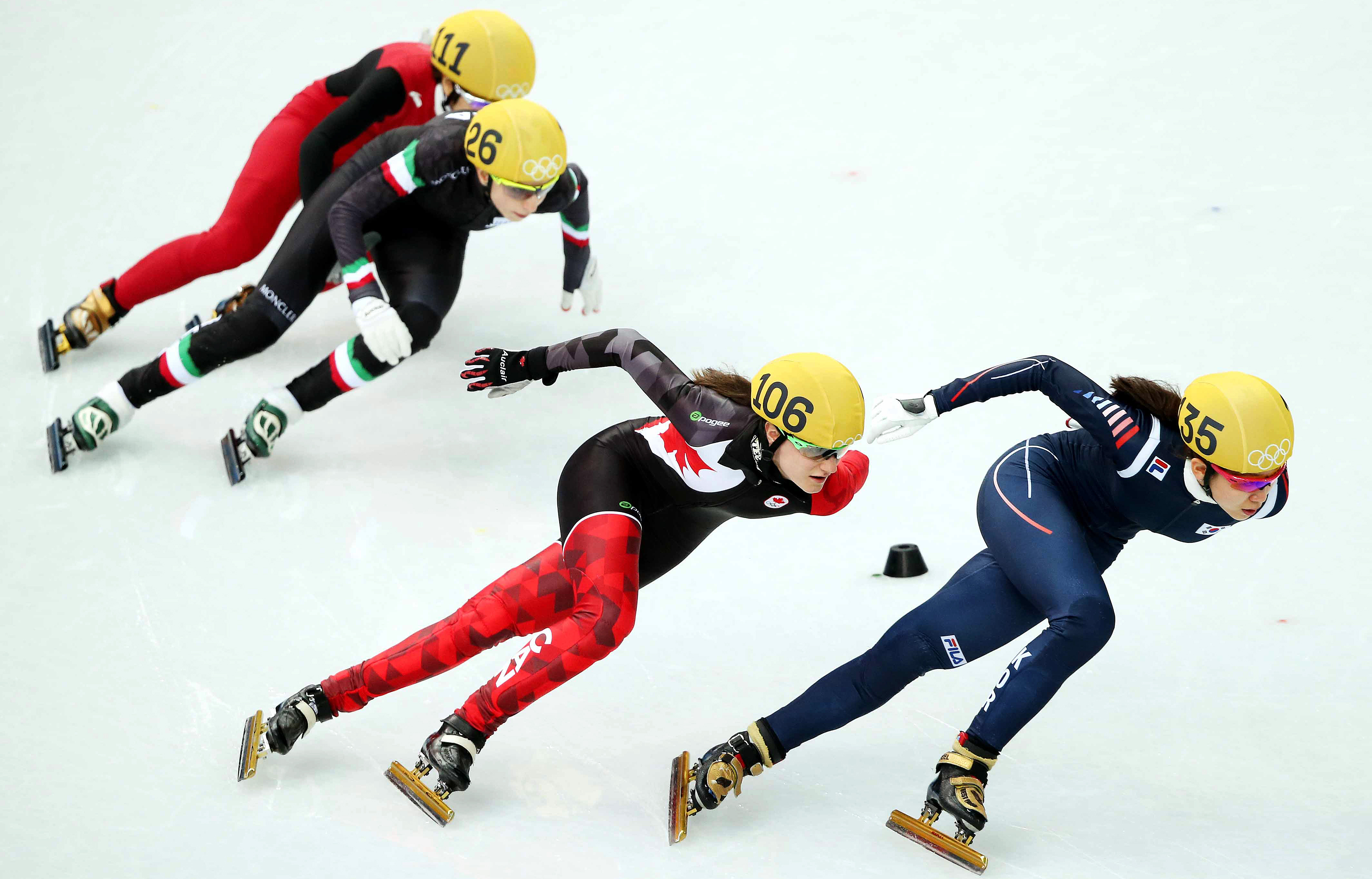
- 3000 meters short-track relay during the 2014 Winter Olympics
- Highest governing body: International Skating Union

Characteristics
- Mixed-sex: Yes
- Type: Separate competitions for male and female
- Equipment: ice skates, helmet, gloves, suit, shin guards, neck guard, safety glasses

Presence
- Olympic: 1988 (demonstration); 1992–present

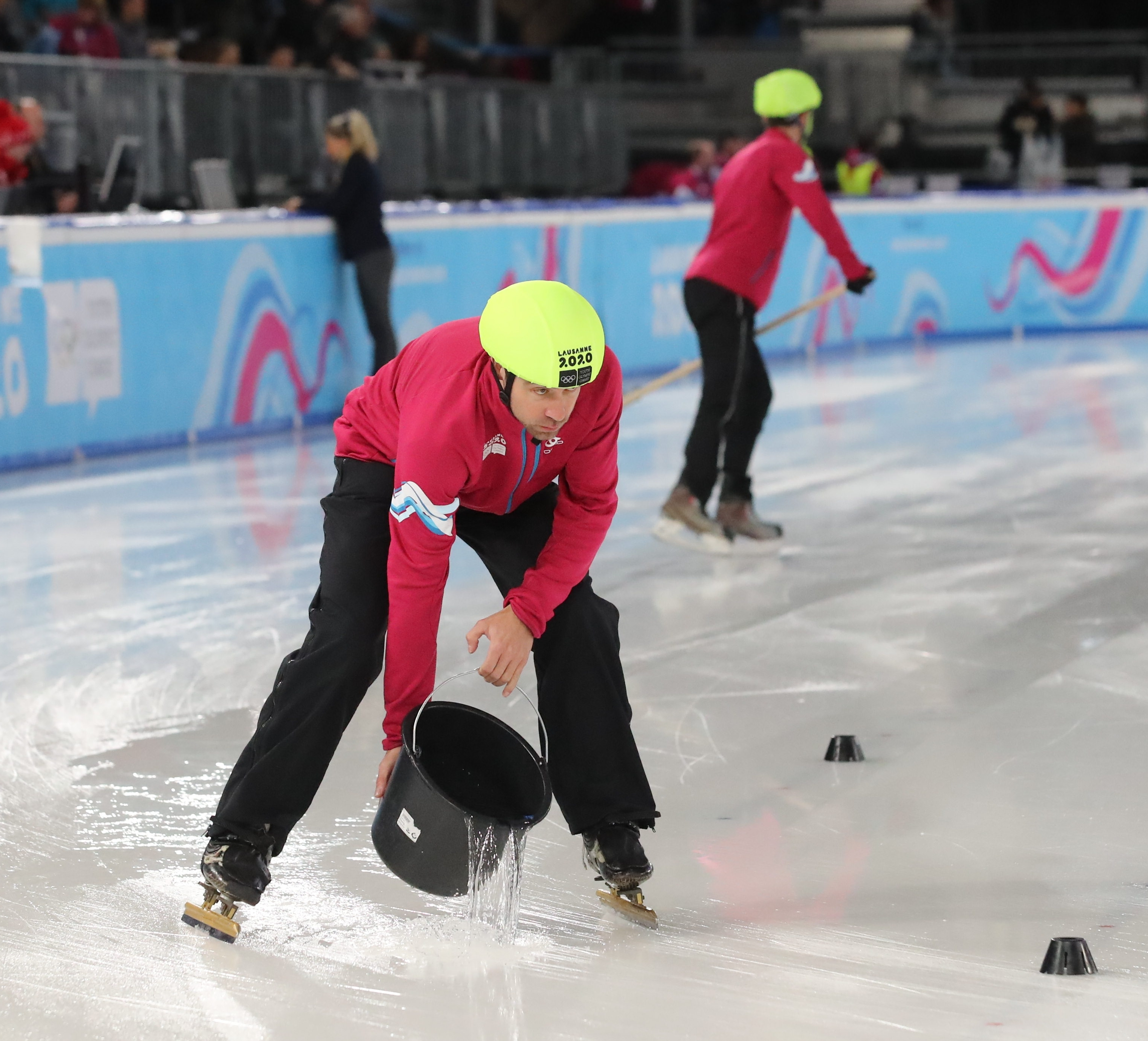
Preparation of the ice

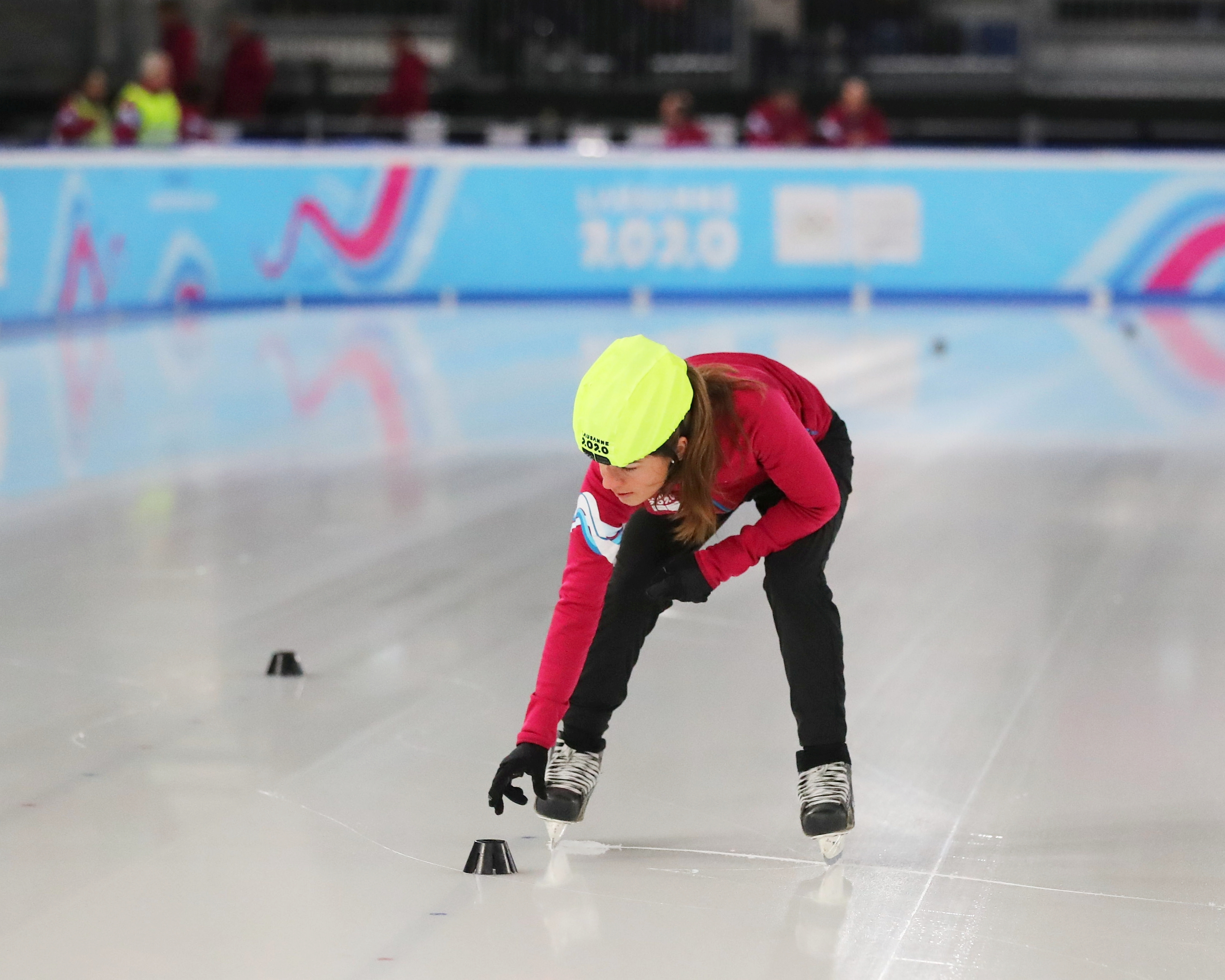
Placement of rubber cones

Short-track speed skating is a form of competitive ice speed skating. In competitions, multiple skaters (typically between four and six) skate on an oval ice track with a length of 111.12 metres (364.57 ft). The rink itself is 60 metres (196.85 ft) long by 30 metres (98.43 ft) wide, which is the same size as an Olympic-sized figure skating rink and an international-sized ice hockey rink. Related sports include long-track speed skating and inline speed skating.

== History ==
Short-track skating developed from speed skating events that were held with mass starts. This form of speed skating was mainly practised in the United States and Canada, as opposed to the international form (derived from Europe), where athletes skated in pairs. At the 1932 Winter Olympics, speed skating events were conducted in the mass start form. Competitions in North America tended to be held indoors, for example in New York's Madison Square Garden III within the arena's ice hockey configuration, requiring a compressed setup reminiscent of the style of roller derby.

In 1967, the International Skating Union (ISU) adopted short-track speed skating, although it did not organize international competitions until 1976. World Championships in short-track speed skating have been officially held since 1981, although events held in 1976–1980 under different names have since received the status of World Championships retrospectively. The name of the competition was changed several times before it was eventually titled the "World Short Track Speed Skating Championships" in 1989; the championships are now held annually.

Short-track speed skating was introduced as a demonstration sport at the 1988 Winter Olympics in Calgary, Canada. It was upgraded to a full Olympic sport in 1992 and has been part of the Winter Olympics ever since. There were only four short-track events in the 1992 Winter Games, but the program was expanded to include six events in 1994 and 1998, and eight events in the 2002 Winter Games. The events are the same for both men and women: 500 meters, 1000 meters, 1500 meters, plus the relay event (5000 meters for men, 3000 meters for women). Since the 2018–19 World Cup season, a 2000-meter mixed-team relay was added, and debuted in the 2022 Winter Olympics. A 3,000-meter super-final event is included in the European Championships, but this is not currently part of the Olympic short-track program.

== Rules ==
Skaters who commit one of the following offenses risk immediate disqualification from a race and having their times rendered invalid and being suspended from playing for a short time.

- Impeding: Intentionally pushing, blocking, tripping or otherwise causing an impediment for another skater
- Off track: Skating outside or inside the designated track
- Assistance: Giving physical assistance to another skater. For example: pushing a teammate from behind for an extra boost, or allowing a teammate to lean on another for stability in corners.
- Shooting the line or Kicking out: Driving the foot in lead ahead to reach the finish faster, resulting in the lead foot lifting off the ice and creating a dangerous situation for others
- Unsportsmanlike conduct: Acting in a manner not befitting an athlete or a role model. Including cursing at a competitor, kicking your feet, striking other skaters or officials, etc.
- Equipment: Not wearing the proper safety equipment, losing equipment during the race, or exposure of skin not on face or neck.
- False Start: Leaving before firing of the starter's pistol. The updated 2023 ISU regulations state that after the first false start, the offender would have to leave.
- Did not finish: Usually due to a fall, the skater did not finish the race.
- Did not skate: The skater did not go to the starting line.
- Finish not timed: The skater's finishing time was not recorded, usually when a skater takes too long to finish the race.

In relay races, each team has four skaters, who can take turns freely by tagging or pushing. A skater may be relayed at any time except during the last two laps. Usually, the outgoing skater pushes the incoming skater to help the teammate to gain speed. If a team member falls, the next person needs to be tagged. A relay team would be penalized if they committed the following:

- Not abiding by previous rules that applied to individual skaters
- Not receiving a tag from a teammate
- Exchanging after the center red line when there are three laps to go

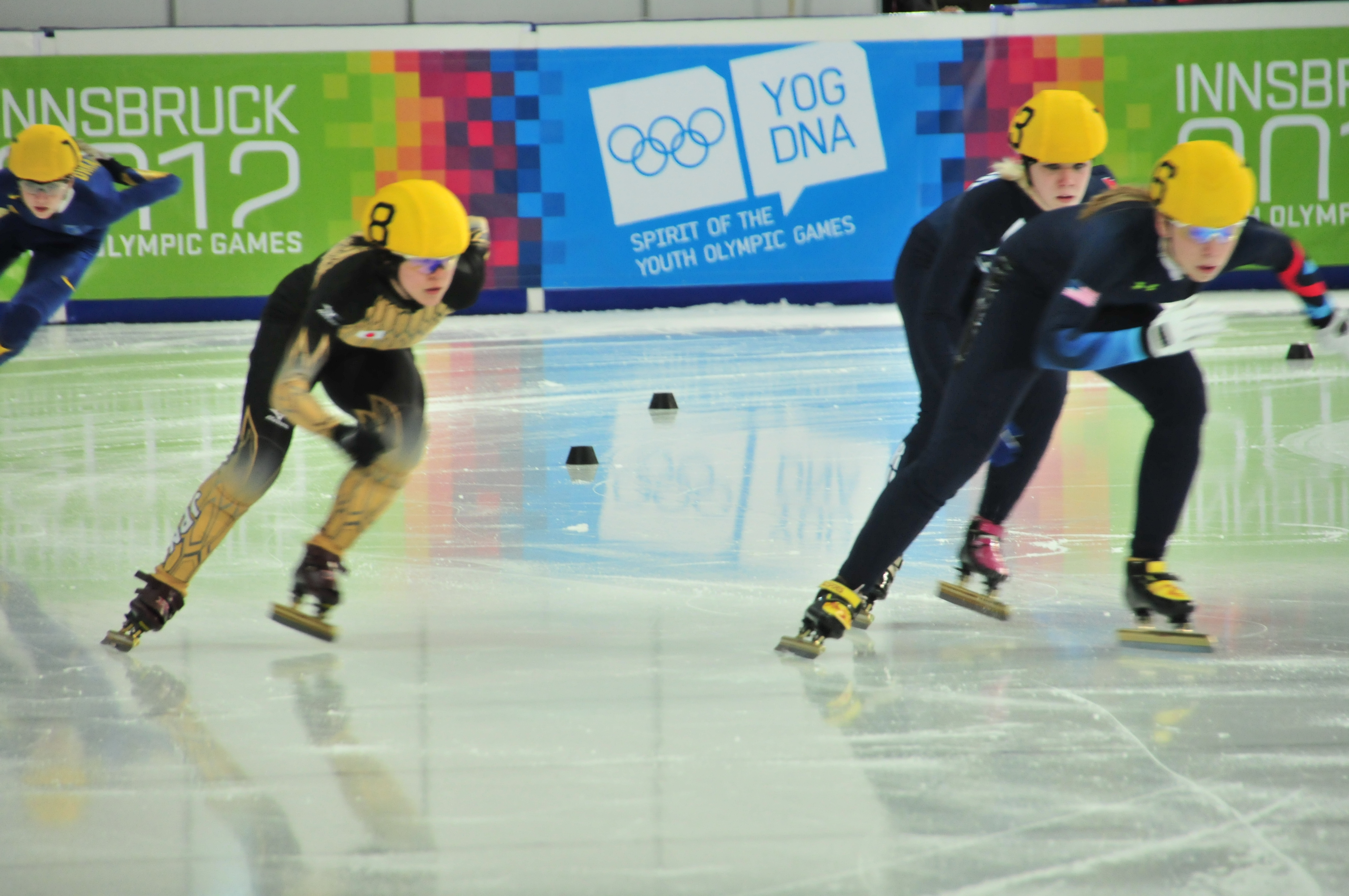
Short-track at the 2012 Winter Youth Olympics, Innsbruck

== World records ==
=== Men ===
Distance	Athlete	Nation	City	Date	Record time	Ref
500 m	Wu Dajing	China	Salt Lake City, United States	11 November 2018	39.505	
1000 m	Hwang Dae-heon	South Korea	Salt Lake City, United States	12 November 2016	1:20.875	
1500 m	Sjinkie Knegt	Netherlands	Salt Lake City, United States	13 November 2016	2:07.943	
3000 m	Noh Jin-kyu	South Korea	Warsaw, Poland	19 March 2011	4:31.891	
5000 m relay	Csaba Burján; Cole Krueger; Shaoang Liu; Shaolin Sándor Liu	Hungary	Calgary, Canada	4 November 2018	6:28.625	

=== Women ===
Distance	Athlete	Nation	City	Date	Record time	Ref
500 m	Xandra Velzeboer	Netherlands	Milan, Italy	12 February 2026	41.399	
1000 m	Suzanne Schulting	Netherlands	Salt Lake City, United States	4 November 2022	1:25.958	
1500 m	Choi Min-jeong	South Korea	Salt Lake City, United States	12 November 2016	2:14.354	
3000 m	Jung Eun-ju	South Korea	Harbin, China	15 March 2008	4:46.983	
3000 m relay	Selma Poutsma; Suzanne Schulting; Yara van Kerkhof; Xandra Velzeboer	Netherlands	Beijing, China	23 October 2021	4:02.809	

=== Mixed ===
Distance	Athlete	Nation	City	Date	Record time	Ref
2000 m relay	Teun Boer; Jens van `t Wout; Xandra Velzeboer; Michelle Velzeboer	Netherlands	Beijing, China	14 March 2025	2:35.339	

== Notable skaters ==
The following is the list of athletes who are Individual gold medalist at the Olympic Winter Games or Overall World Champion and have won Olympic Winter Games or Overall World Championships at least three times.

=== Men ===
Athlete	Nation	Born	Olympics				World Championships (overall)				Olympics + World Championships (overall)				World Championships (distances, relay, team)				Total			
Athlete	Nation	Born	Gold medal	Silver medal	Bronze medal	Total	Gold medal	Silver medal	Bronze medal	Total				Total	Gold medal	Silver medal	Bronze medal	Total				Total
Ahn Hyun-Soo (Viktor Ahn)	South Korea; Russia	1985	6	0	2	8	6	1	0	7	12	1	2	15	22	13	6	41	34	13	9	56
Marc Gagnon	Canada	1975	3	0	2	5	4	2	1	7	7	2	3	12	15	9	4	28	22	11	7	40
Charles Hamelin	Canada	1984	4	1	0	5	1	3	3	7	5	4	3	12	12	15	10	37	16	19	13	48
Kim Ki-hoon	South Korea	1967	3	0	0	3	1	2	1	4	4	2	1	7	2+	1+	2+	5+	6+	3+	3+	12+
Apolo Anton Ohno	United States	1982	2	2	4	8	1	2	1	4	3	4	5	12	8	5	6	19	11	9	11	31
Lee Ho-Suk	South Korea	1986	1	4	0	5	2	2	0	4	3	6	0	9	8	5	4	17	11	11	4	26
Kim Dong-Sung	South Korea	1980	1	1	0	2	2	0	1	3	3	1	1	5	10	7	3	20	13	8	4	25
Shaoang Liu	China	1998	2	0	2	4	1	0	0	1	3	0	2	5	1	5	2	8	4	5	4	13

=== Women ===
Athlete	Nation	Born	Olympics				World Championships (overall)				Olympics + World Championships (overall)				World Championships (distances, relay, team)				Total			
Athlete	Nation	Born	Gold medal	Silver medal	Bronze medal	Total	Gold medal	Silver medal	Bronze medal	Total				Total	Gold medal	Silver medal	Bronze medal	Total				Total
Yang Yang (A)	China	1976	2	2	1	5	6	1	0	7	8	3	1	12	26	12	5	43	34	15	6	55
Choi Min-jeong	South Korea	1998	4	3	0	7	4	1	0	5	8	4	0	12	17	6	1	24	25	10	1	36
Wang Meng	China	1985	4	1	1	6	3	3	0	6	7	4	1	12	18	10	3	32	25	14	4	43
Chun Lee-kyung	South Korea	1976	4	0	1	5	3	2	0	5	7	2	1	10	10	11	3	24	17	13	4	34
Sylvie Daigle	Canada	1962	1	1	0	2	5	2	1	8	6	3	1	10	22+	8+	?	31+	28+	11+	1+	40+
Jin Sun-yu	South Korea	1988	3	0	0	3	3	0	0	3	6	0	0	6	10	3	1	14	16	3	1	20
Suzanne Schulting	Netherlands	1997	3	1	2	6	2	0	0	2	5	1	2	8	5	1	2	8	10	2	3	15
Shim Suk-Hee	South Korea	1997	3	1	1	5	1	1	3	5	4	2	4	12	11	4	1	16	15	6	5	26
Nathalie Lambert	Canada	1962	1	2	0	3	3	2	2	7	4	4	2	10	14+	3+	2+	19+	18+	7+	4+	29+
Choi Eun-kyung	South Korea	1984	2	2	0	4	2	1	0	3	4	3	0	7	12	3	3	18	16	6	3	25
Arianna Fontana	Italy	1990	3	6	5	14	0	1	3	4	3	7	8	18	1	6	10	17	4	13	18	35
Park Seung-hi	South Korea	1992	2	0	3	5	1	2	0	3	3	2	3	8	8	4	1	13	11	6	4	21
Zhou Yang	China	1991	3	0	0	3	0	1	1	2	3	1	1	5	5	4	4	13	8	5	5	18

== See also ==
- Short-track speed skating at the Winter Olympics
- List of short-track speed skaters
