= 2007–08 ISU Short Track Speed Skating World Cup =

International speed skating competition

ISU Short Track World Cup
- Dates: 19 October 2007 – 10 February 2008

The 2008 Short Track Speed Skating World Cup was a multi-race tournament over a season for short track speed skating. The season began on 19 October 2007 and ended on 10 February 2008.

== Men ==
=== Events ===
Date	Location	Discipline	Winner	Second	Third
19–21 October 2007	(China) Harbin	500 m	(Canada) François-Louis Tremblay	(South Korea) Sung Si-bak	(Canada) Alex Boisvert-Lacroix
19–21 October 2007	(China) Harbin	1000 m	(South Korea) Ahn Hyun-soo	(South Korea) Lee Ho-suk	(Canada) François-Louis Tremblay
19–21 October 2007	(China) Harbin	1500 m	(South Korea) Sung Si-bak	(South Korea) Lee Seung-hun	(Canada) Charles Hamelin
19–21 October 2007	(China) Harbin	1500 m	(South Korea) Ahn Hyun-soo	(South Korea) Lee Ho-suk	(South Korea) Song Kyung-taek
19–21 October 2007	(China) Harbin	5000 m relay	South Korea; Ahn Hyun-soo; Song Kyung-taek; Lee Ho-suk; Lee Seung-hoon	Canada; Charles Hamelin; Steve Robillard; Marc-André Monette; François-Louis Tremblay	Italy; Roberto Serra; Claudio Rinaldi; Nicola Rodigari; Yuri Confortola
26–28 October 2007	(Japan) Kōbe	500 m	(South Korea) Sung Si-bak	(Canada) François-Louis Tremblay	(South Korea) Kwak Yoon-gy
26–28 October 2007	(Japan) Kōbe	1000 m	(South Korea) Sung Si-bak	(South Korea) Kwak Yoon-gy	(Canada) Charles Hamelin
26–28 October 2007	(Japan) Kōbe	1000 m	(South Korea) Ahn Hyun-soo	(South Korea) Song Kyung-taek	(Canada) Charles Hamelin
26–28 October 2007	(Japan) Kōbe	1500 m	(South Korea) Ahn Hyun-soo	(South Korea) Lee Ho-suk	(South Korea) Song Kyung-taek
26–28 October 2007	(Japan) Kōbe	5000 m relay	South Korea; Ahn Hyun-soo; Song Kyung-taek; Lee Ho-suk; Lee Seung-hoon	Canada; Charles Hamelin; Steve Robillard; Marc-André Monette; François-Louis Tremblay	China; Sui Baoku; Liu Xiaoliang; Wei Jiguang; Song Weilong
23–25 November 2007	(Netherlands) Heerenveen	500 m	(South Korea) Sung Si-bak	(Canada) Charles Hamelin	(Japan) Satoru Terao
23–25 November 2007	(Netherlands) Heerenveen	500 m	(South Korea) Sung Si-bak	(Canada) François-Louis Tremblay	(South Korea) Kwak Yoon-gy
23–25 November 2007	(Netherlands) Heerenveen	1000 m	(South Korea) Ahn Hyun-soo	(South Korea) Lee Ho-suk	(Canada) Charles Hamelin
23–25 November 2007	(Netherlands) Heerenveen	1500 m	(South Korea) Lee Ho-suk	(South Korea) Song Kyung-taek	(South Korea) Ahn Hyun-soo
23–25 November 2007	(Netherlands) Heerenveen	5000 m relay	South Korea; Sung Si-bak; Song Kyung-taek; Lee Ho-suk; Ahn Hyun-soo	China; Sui Baoku; Liu Xiaoliang; Wei Jiguang; Li Ye	Japan; Satoshi Sakashita; Satoru Terao; Takahiro Fujimoto; Shinichi Tagami
30 November - 2 December 2007	(Italy) Turin	500 m	(Canada) François-Louis Tremblay	(South Korea) Sung Si-bak	(United States) J.P. Kepka
30 November - 2 December 2007	(Italy) Turin	1000 m	(South Korea) Song Kyung-taek	(South Korea) Ahn Hyun-soo	(United States) Jordan Malone
30 November - 2 December 2007	(Italy) Turin	1500 m	(South Korea) Sung Si-bak	(Canada) Charles Hamelin	(Italy) Yuri Confortola
30 November - 2 December 2007	(Italy) Turin	1500 m	(South Korea) Ahn Hyun-soo	(South Korea) Lee Ho-suk	(United States) Jordan Malone
30 November - 2 December 2007	(Italy) Turin	5000 m relay	South Korea; Lee Seung-hoon; Song Kyung-taek; Lee Ho-suk; Ahn Hyun-soo	Canada; Charles Hamelin; Steve Robillard; Marc-André Monette; François-Louis Tremblay	Italy; Roberto Serra; Claudio Rinaldi; Nicola Rodigari; Yuri Confortola
18–20 January 2008 European Championships in (Latvia) Ventspils
1–3 February 2008	(Canada) Quebec City	500 m	(South Korea) Kwak Yoon-gy	(Canada) Charles Hamelin	(United Kingdom) Jon Eley
1–3 February 2008	(Canada) Quebec City	1000 m	(South Korea) Sung Si-bak	(China) Li Ye	(Canada) Guillaume Bastille
1–3 February 2008	(Canada) Quebec City	1000 m	(China) Zhang Zhiqiang	(Canada) Marc-André Monette	(Canada) Guillaume Bastille
1–3 February 2008	(Canada) Quebec City	1500 m	(South Korea) Lee Ho-suk	(South Korea) Lee Seung-hun	(Canada) Charles Hamelin
1–3 February 2008	(Canada) Quebec City	5000 m relay	South Korea; Lee Seung-hoon; Kwak Yoon-gy; Lee Ho-suk; Sung Si-bak	United States; Apolo Anton Ohno; Jeff Simon; Jordan Malone; Charles Leveille	Canada; Charles Hamelin; François Hamelin; Marc-André Monette; Jean-François Monette
8–10 February 2008	(United States) Salt Lake City	500 m	(Canada) Charles Hamelin	(South Korea) Sung Si-bak	(Japan) Satoru Terao
8–10 February 2008	(United States) Salt Lake City	500 m	(South Korea) Sung Si-bak	(South Korea) Kwak Yoon-gy	(Canada) François Hamelin
8–10 February 2008	(United States) Salt Lake City	1000 m	(United States) Apolo Anton Ohno	(South Korea) Lee Seung-hun	(South Korea) Lee Ho-suk
8–10 February 2008	(United States) Salt Lake City	1500 m	(South Korea) Lee Seung-hun	(South Korea) Lee Ho-suk	(United States) Apolo Anton Ohno
8–10 February 2008	(United States) Salt Lake City	5000 m relay	South Korea; Lee Seung-hoon; Kwak Yoon-gy; Lee Ho-suk; Sung Si-bak	China; Sui Baoku; Han Jialiang; Song Weilong; Li Ye	United Kingdom; Jon Eley; Paul Worth; Paul Stanley; Tom Iveson
7–9 March 2008 World Championships in (South Korea) Gangneung
15–16 March 2008 World Team Championships in (China) Harbin

=== World Cup Rankings ===
500 m

Rank	Name	Points
1	(South Korea) Sung Si-bak	5600
2	(South Korea) Kwak Yoon-gy	4104
3	(Canada) François-Louis Tremblay	3600
4	(Canada) Charles Hamelin	3440
5	(Japan) Satoru Terao	2497
6	(United States) J.P. Kepka	1501
7	(United Kingdom) Jon Eley	1438
8	(Canada) Alex Boisvert-Lacroix	1217
9	(China) Han Jialiang	1024
10	(Japan) Satoshi Sakashita	980

1000 m

Rank	Name	Points
1	(South Korea) Ahn Hyun-soo	3800
2	(South Korea) Lee Ho-suk	3592
3	(South Korea) Song Kyung-taek	2824
4	(Canada) Charles Hamelin	2432
5	(South Korea) Sung Si-bak	2000
6	(United States) Jordan Malone	1873
7	(China) Sui Bao Ku	1786
8	(Canada) François-Louis Tremblay	1562
9	(China) Zhang Zhiqiang	1477
10	(South Korea) Lee Seung-hoon	1420

1500 m

Rank	Name	Points
1	(South Korea) Lee Ho-suk	5200
2	(South Korea) Ahn Hyun-soo	3640
3	(South Korea) Lee Seung-hun	2810
4	(South Korea) Song Kyung-taek	2342
5	(United States) Jordan Malone	2231
6	(Italy) Yuri Confortola	2213
7	(Canada) Charles Hamelin	2080
8	(South Korea) Sung Si-bak	2000
9	(China) Song Weilong	1376
10	(United States) Ryan Bedford	1312

5000 m relay

Rank	Team	Points
1	South Korea	4000
2	Canada	3040
3	China	2752
4	United States	2132
5	Italy	2120
6	United Kingdom	1706
7	Russia	1562
8	Japan	1398
9	Germany	1364
10	France	926

== Women ==
=== Events ===
Date	Location	Discipline	Siegerin	Second	Third
19–21 October 2007	(China) Harbin	500 m	(China) Wang Meng	(China) Fu Tianyu	(South Korea) Park Seung-hi
19–21 October 2007	(China) Harbin	1000 m	(China) Wang Meng	(South Korea) Jung Eun-ju	(South Korea) Jin Sun-yu
19–21 October 2007	(China) Harbin	1500 m	(South Korea) Cho Ha-ri	(South Korea) Shin Sae-bom	(China) Zhou Yang
19–21 October 2007	(China) Harbin	1500 m	(South Korea) Jin Sun-yu	(South Korea) Yang Shin-young	(China) Liu Qiuhong
19–21 October 2007	(China) Harbin	3000 m relay	China; Wang Meng; Fu Tianyu; Liu Qiuhong; Zhou Yang	South Korea; Jung Eun-ju; Park Seung-hi; Shin Sae-bom; Yang Shin-young	Canada; Amanda Overland; Jessica Gregg; Kalyna Roberge; Tania Vicent
26–28 October 2007	(Japan) Kōbe	500 m	(China) Wang Meng	(South Korea) Shin Sae-bom	(China) Zhao Nannan
26–28 October 2007	(Japan) Kōbe	1000 m	(South Korea) Park Seung-hi	(China) Wang Meng	(South Korea) Cho Ha-ri
26–28 October 2007	(Japan) Kōbe	1000 m	(South Korea) Jin Sun-yu	(South Korea) Yang Shin-young	(Canada) Amanda Overland
26–28 October 2007	(Japan) Kōbe	1500 m	(South Korea) Jin Sun-yu	(South Korea) Jung Eun-ju	(South Korea) Yang Shin-young
26–28 October 2007	(Japan) Kōbe	3000 m relay	China; Wang Meng; Fu Tianyu; Liu Qiuhong; Zhou Yang	Italy; Arianna Fontana; Cecilia Maffei; Katia Zini; Marta Capurso	Japan; Biba Sakurai; Ayuko Itō; Mika Ozawa; Yuka Kamino
23–25 November 2007	(Netherlands) Heerenveen	500 m	(China) Liu Qiuhong	(China) Zhao Nannan	(China) Fu Tianyu
23–25 November 2007	(Netherlands) Heerenveen	500 m	(China) Wang Meng	(South Korea) Park Seung-hi	(China) Fu Tianyu
23–25 November 2007	(Netherlands) Heerenveen	1000 m	(South Korea) Jin Sun-yu	(China) Wang Meng	(China) Zhou Yang
23–25 November 2007	(Netherlands) Heerenveen	1500 m	(South Korea) Jung Eun-ju	(South Korea) Jin Sun-yu	(China) Zhou Yang
23–25 November 2007	(Netherlands) Heerenveen	3000 m relay	China; Wang Meng; Fu Tianyu; Liu Qiuhong; Zhou Yang	Italy; Arianna Fontana; Cecilia Maffei; Katia Zini; Marta Capurso	Russia; Yekaterina Belova; Valeria Potiomkina; Olga Maskaikina; Nina Yevteyeva
30 November - 2 December 2007	(Italy) Turin	500 m	(China) Wang Meng	(China) Fu Tianyu	(Canada) Kalyna Roberge
30 November - 2 December 2007	(Italy) Turin	1000 m	(South Korea) Yang Shin-young	(South Korea) Jin Sun-yu	(United States) Katherine Reutter
30 November - 2 December 2007	(Italy) Turin	1500 m	(South Korea) Shin Sae-bom	(Canada) Kalyna Roberge	(South Korea) Park Seung-hi
30 November - 2 December 2007	(Italy) Turin	1500 m	(South Korea) Jung Eun-ju	(South Korea) Yang Shin-young	(China) Zhou Yang
30 November - 2 December 2007	(Italy) Turin	3000 m relay	China; Wang Meng; Fu Tianyu; Liu Qiuhong; Zhou Yang	Italy; Arianna Fontana; Cecilia Maffei; Katia Zini; Marta Capurso	United States; Kimberly Derrick; Lana Gehring; Carly Wilson; Katherine Reutter
18–20 January 2008 European Championships in (Latvia) Ventspils
1–3 February 2008	(Canada) Quebec City	500 m	(China) Wang Meng	(Canada) Kalyna Roberge	(China) Zhao Nannan
1–3 February 2008	(Canada) Quebec City	1000 m	(Canada) Kalyna Roberge	(Bulgaria) Evgenia Radanova	(South Korea) Park Seung-hi
1–3 February 2008	(Canada) Quebec City	1000 m	(China) Zhou Yang	(South Korea) Jin Sun-yu	(China) Liu Qiuhong
1–3 February 2008	(Canada) Quebec City	1500 m	(South Korea) Jin Sun-yu	(South Korea) Yang Shin-young	(United States) Allison Baver
1–3 February 2008	(Canada) Quebec City	3000 m relay	China; Wang Meng; Meng Xiaoxue; Liu Qiuhong; Zhou Yang	Canada; Amanda Overland; Jessica Gregg; Kalyna Roberge; Tania Vicent	Bulgaria; Evgenia Radanova; Marina Georgieva-Nikolova; Daniela Ivanova; Gergana Patsova
8–10 February 2008	(United States) Salt Lake City	500 m	(China) Wang Meng	(China) Zhao Nannan	(Australia) Tatiana Borodulina
8–10 February 2008	(United States) Salt Lake City	500 m	(Bulgaria) Evgenia Radanova	(China) Fu Tianyu	(China) Liu Qiuhong
8–10 February 2008	(United States) Salt Lake City	1000 m	(China) Wang Meng	(United States) Katherine Reutter	(South Korea) Yang Shin-young
8–10 February 2008	(United States) Salt Lake City	1500 m	(China) Zhou Yang	(United States) Katherine Reutter	(United States) Allison Baver
8–10 February 2008	(United States) Salt Lake City	3000 m relay	South Korea; Jung Eun-ju; Park Seung-hi; Shin Sae-bom; Yang Shin-young	China; Wang Meng; Meng Xiaoxue; Liu Qiuhong; Fu Tianyu	United States; Kimberly Derrick; Allison Baver; Carly Wilson; Katherine Reutter
7–9 March 2008 World Championships in (South Korea) Gangneung
15–16 March 2008 World Team Championships in (China) Harbin

=== World Cup Rankings ===
500 m

Rank	Name	Points
1	(China) Wang Meng	6000
2	(China) Fu Tianyu	4192
3	(China) Zhao Nannan	3904
4	(South Korea) Park Seung-hi	2732
5	(Canada) Kalyna Roberge	2540
6	(South Korea) Shin Sae-bom	2136
7	(Bulgaria) Evgenia Radanova	2096
8	(China) Liu Qiuhong	1640
9	(Canada) Jessica Gregg	1071
10	(Australia) Tatiana Borodulina	1050

1000 m

Rank	Name	Points
1	(South Korea) Jin Sun-yu	4502
2	(China) Wang Meng	4322
3	(South Korea) Yang Shin-young	3772
4	(China) Zhou Yang	3074
5	(United States) Katherine Reutter	2315
6	(South Korea) Jung Eun-ju	2050
7	(Bulgaria) Evgenia Radanova	1788
8	(South Korea) Park Seung-hi	1640
9	(China) Liu Qiuhong	1312
10	(Canada) Amanda Overland	1305

1500 m

Rank	Name	Points
1	(South Korea) Jin Sun-yu	4172
2	(South Korea) Jung Eun-ju	3882
3	(China) Zhou Yang	3658
4	(South Korea) Yang Shin-young	3315
5	(China) Liu Qiuhong	1993
6	(United States) Katherine Reutter	1904
7	(South Korea) Shin Sae-bom	1800
8	(Japan) Mika Ozawa	1580
9	(Canada) Kalyna Roberge	1574
10	(China) Meng Xiaoxue	1529

3000 m relay

Rank	Team	Points
1	China	4000
2	South Korea	2824
3	Italy	2610
4	Canada	2362
5	United States	2002
6	Japan	1870
7	Russia	1640
8	Bulgaria	1280
9	Netherlands	1128
10	Germany	926

== See also ==
- 2008 World Short Track Speed Skating Championships
- 2008 World Short Track Speed Skating Team Championships
- 2008 European Short Track Speed Skating Championships
