= Great Britain at the 2010 Winter Olympics =

- Flag of the United Kingdom
- IOC code: GBR
- NOC: British Olympic Association

in Vancouver
- Competitors: 50 in 11 sports
- Flag bearers: Shelley Rudman (opening); Amy Williams (closing)
- Medals Ranked 19th: Gold 1 Silver 0 Bronze 0 Total 1

Winter Olympics appearances (overview)
- 1924; 1928; 1932; 1936; 1948; 1952; 1956; 1960; 1964; 1968; 1972; 1976; 1980; 1984; 1988; 1992; 1994; 1998; 2002; 2006; 2010; 2014; 2018; 2022; 2026

Great Britain, represented by the British Olympic Association (BOA), competed in the 2010 Winter Olympics in Vancouver, British Columbia, Canada and sent a team of selected athletes was officially known as Team GB. The team was made up of athletes from the whole United Kingdom including Northern Ireland, whose athletes may elect to hold Irish citizenship, allowing them to represent either Great Britain or Ireland. Additionally some British overseas territories compete separately from Britain in Olympic competition.

Great Britain sent a delegation of fifty athletes to compete in eleven sports and were led by Andy Hunt as Chef de Mission, but despite being set a target of three medals by UK Sport, the team won just one, Amy Williams' gold in the women's skeleton, and finished 19th in the medal table.

== Medallists ==
The following British competitors won medals at the Games. In the discipline sections below, medalists' names are in bold. All results are taken from the official Vancouver 2010 website.

Medal	Name	Sport	Event
Gold	Amy Williams	Skeleton	Women's

== Targets ==
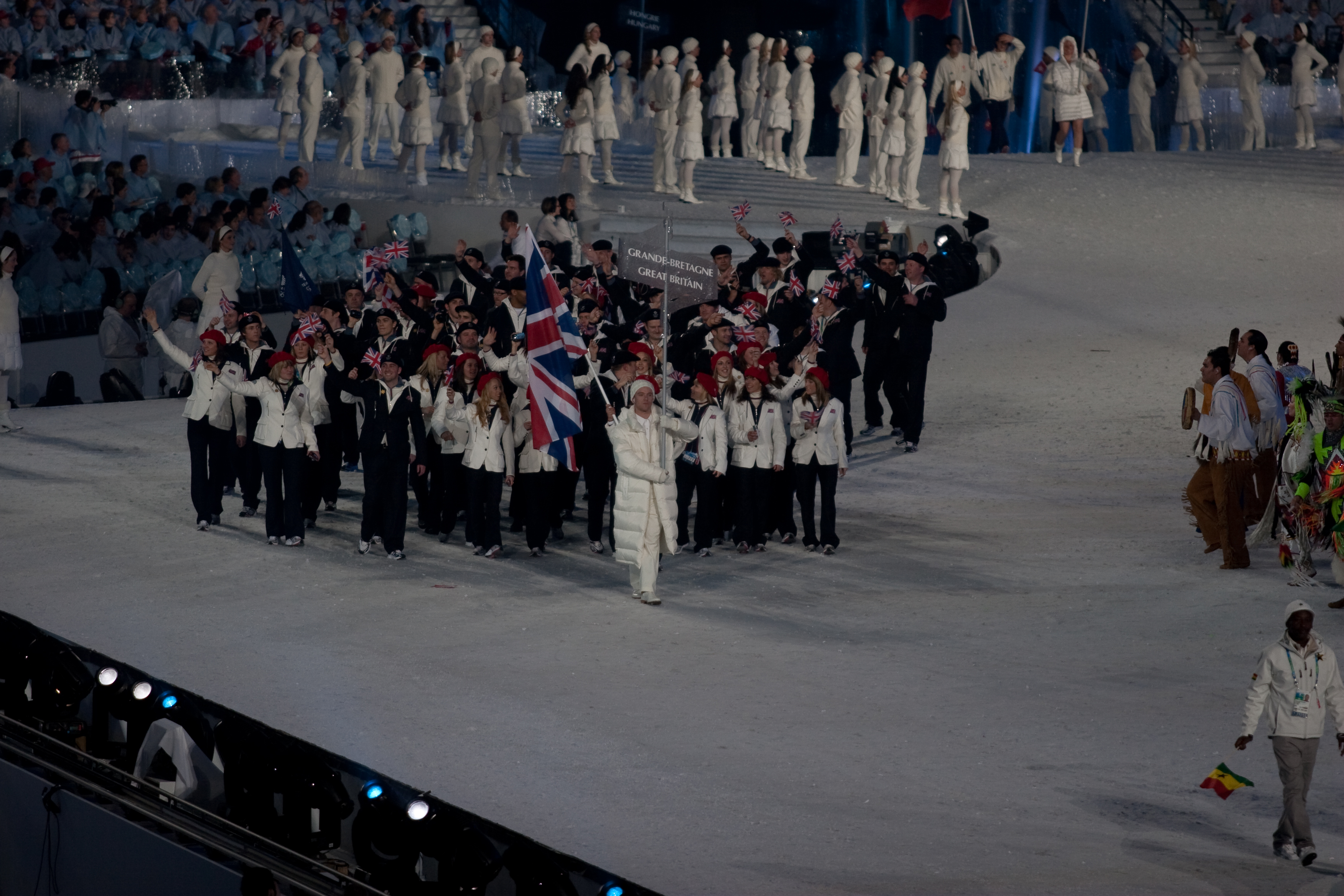
The athletes entering the stadium, led by flagbearer Shelley Rudman, during the opening ceremonies.

UK Sport, the organisation responsible for distributing National Lottery funding to elite sport, set Team GB a target of winning three medals, of any colour, at the Vancouver Games; two more than the single silver medal won in Turin by Shelley Rudman. If achieved this would have been the best performance by a British Winter Olympics team since 1936 when a gold, silver and bronze medal were won. The target was set following £6.5 million of funding in the four years leading up to the Games. Whilst no particular events were targeted as potential sources of medals, the success of British athletes in the previous four years was taken into account when setting the target; the men's curling team and the two-woman bobsleigh team, Nicola Minichiello and Gillian Cooke, won world championships, and in 2008 Kristan Bromley became the first man in the history of bob skeleton to win the World Championship, European Championship and World Cup in the same year.

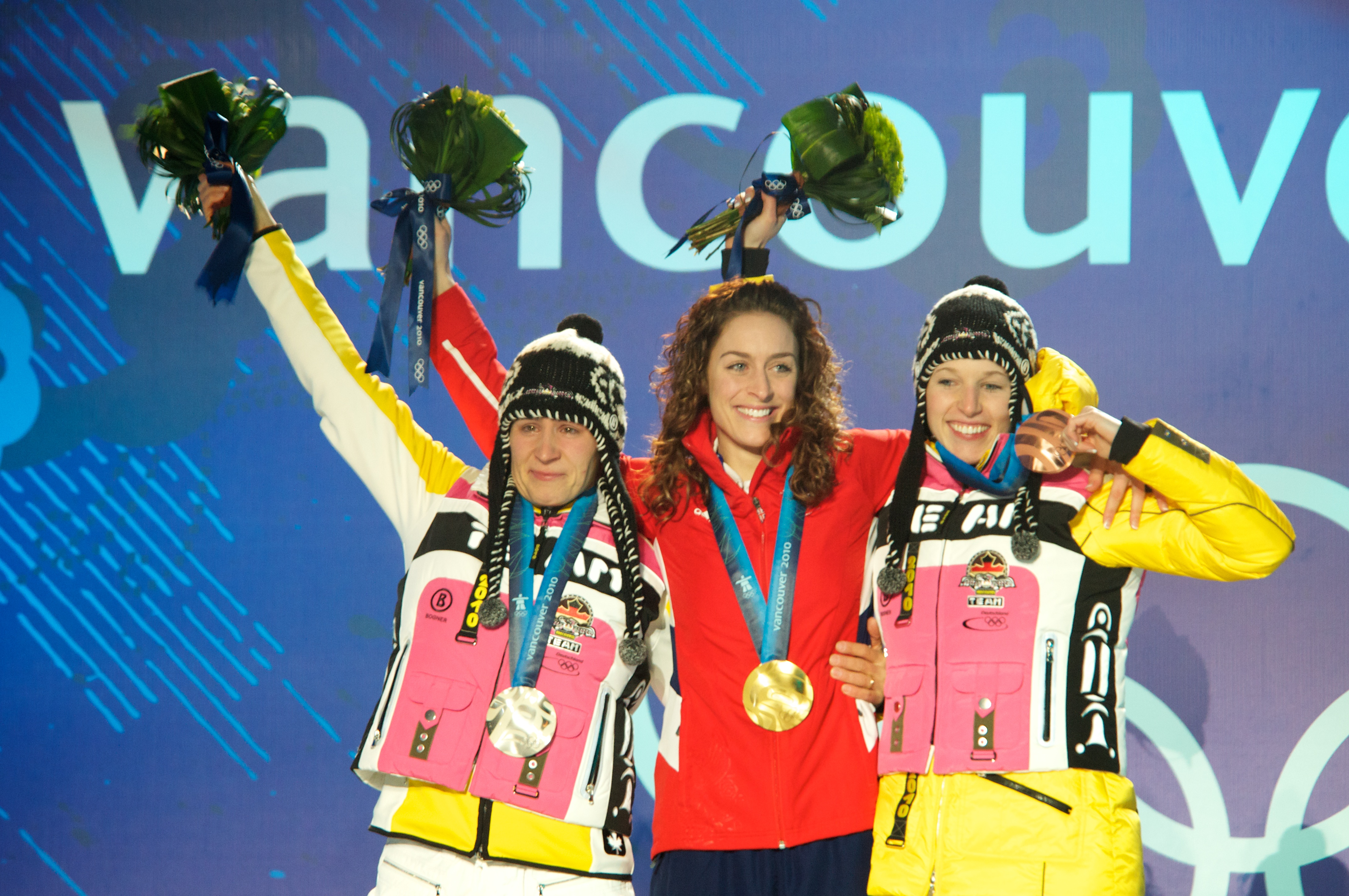
Amy Williams of Great Britain (centre) with the gold medal she won in the women's skeleton alongside silver medalist Kerstin Szymkowiak (left) and bronze medalist Anja Huber (right).

The preparations of Britain's skiers and snowboarders for the Games were hampered by the financial problems of the British Ski and Snowboard Federation (BSSF), operating under the name Snowsport GB, which was responsible for administering the lottery funds received through UK Sport. In August 2009 the BSFF was £300,000 in debt and a number of British skiers, including medal hope Chemmy Alcott, were forced to fund their own summer training camps in New Zealand and Chile. On 5 February 2010, just a week before the opening ceremony of the Games, it was announced that BSSF had entered administration after the Royal Bank of Scotland withdrew the organisation's overdraft facility. This put the participation of British skiers in doubt, as a governing body is a necessity for Olympic competition, but the British Olympic Association (BOA) revived a subsidiary company to take over. The financial difficulties suffered by Alcott, partly as a result of the BSSF collapse, led her to consider her future in the sport at the end of the Games.

On 25 February, having finished 19th overall in the medal table, and 14th out of European countries, head of Team GB Andy Hunt said that despite not reaching UK Sport's target the team "have achieved what we set out to do" by bettering their performance in the 2006 Games. This was in reference to Amy Williams' gold in the women's skeleton, which was the sole medal won by the team.

Steve Redgrave, vice-president of the BOA, added "I don't think there is a sense of disappointment – I think there is a sense of celebration of winning that gold medal. I would take one gold medal over five bronze medals any day." Hunt also announced that the BOA would conduct a strategic review of funding and may support the channeling of more funds towards realistic medal hopes.

== Alpine skiing ==
Four British athletes competed in alpine skiing events at the Games. Andy Noble and David Ryding qualified for two events each whilst Ed Drake and Chemmy Alcott, taking part in her third Olympics, qualified for all five variants. The preparations of Britain's skiers were disrupted by the collapse of Snowsport GB, but all athletes were able to enter the games after the intervention of the British Olympic Association. Alcott, considered a realistic contender for a medal, achieved the squad's best finish coming eleventh in the women's combined.

Men

Athlete	Event	Run 1	Run 2	Total	Rank
Ed Drake	Combined	Downhill; 1:56.63	Slalom; 54.28	2:50.91	29
Ed Drake	Downhill	1:57.91	N/A		38
Ed Drake	Giant slalom	1:21.65	1:23.48	2:45.13	37
Ed Drake	Slalom	did not start			
Ed Drake	Super-G	1:33.20	N/A		32
Andy Noble	Giant slalom	1:20.79	1:24.06	2:44.85	36
Andy Noble	Slalom	51.55	54.58	1:46.13	29
David Ryding	Giant slalom	1:21.97	1:26.06	2:48.03	47
David Ryding	Slalom	51.58	53.55	1:45.13	27

Women

Athlete	Event	Run 1	Run 2	Total	Rank
Chemmy Alcott	Combined	Downhill; 1:27.06	Slalom; 45.45	2:12.51	11
Chemmy Alcott	Downhill	1:47.31	N/A		13
Chemmy Alcott	Giant slalom	1:17.53	1:12.41	2:29.94	27
Chemmy Alcott	Slalom	did not finish			
Chemmy Alcott	Super-G	1:23.46	N/A		20

== Biathlon ==
Britain sent a single biathlete to the Games; Lee-Steve Jackson was the first British competitor to qualify for the Olympic pursuit and finished in 56th position. He also took part in the individual and sprint events.

Athlete	Event	Final		
Athlete	Event	Time	Misses	Rank
Lee-Steve Jackson	Men's individual	55:37.5	1+2+1+0	66
Lee-Steve Jackson	Men's pursuit	39:54.7	0+1+3+0	56
Lee-Steve Jackson	Men's sprint	27:18.1	1+1	55

== Bobsleigh ==
Britain sent eight athletes to compete in the bobsleigh events with entries in the two-man, four-man and two-woman competitions. Allyn Condon competed in the four-man event having previously taken part in the 4 × 100 m relay at the 2000 Summer Olympics in Sydney; the first Briton to take part in both a Summer and Winter Games since Marcus Adam. In the two-man the British pairing of Dan Money and John Jackson suffered a crash on their first run; they escaped serious injury, but were disqualified for failing to complete the run.

Nicola Minichiello and Gillian Cooke went into the two-woman event as the reigning world champions and after two of four runs were placed tenth, one position ahead of Paula Walker and Kelly Thomas. On the third run Minichiello and Cooke lost control, resulting in them crossing the finishing line with their sled on its side, and the pair withdrew from the competition before the final run.

Athlete	Event	Runs								Total	Rank
Athlete	Event	Run 1	Rank	Run 2	Rank	Run 3	Rank	Run 4	Rank	Total	Rank
Dan Money; John Jackson	Two-man	DSQ (crashed)		n/a						DSQ	
Allyn Condon; John Jackson; Henry Nwume; Dan Money	Four-man	51.53	11	54.29 (1:45.82)	22 (21)	52.24 (2:38.06)	14 (18)	52.15	14	3:30.21	17
Nicola Minichiello; Gillian Cooke	Two-woman	53.85	10	53.73 (1:47.58)	12 (10)	55.87 (2:43.45)	21 (16)	did not start		did not finish	
Paula Walker; Kelly Thomas	Two-woman	54.19	14	53.58 (1:47.77)	9 (11)	54.47 (2:42.24)	15 (11)	53.94	11	3:36.18	11

Cumulative time and standings given in brackets.

== Cross-country skiing ==
Three British cross-country skiers went to the Games, all three were competing in their first Olympics. Andrew Young and Andrew Musgrave, aged seventeen and nineteen, entered the team sprint in addition to their individual events but were forced to withdraw as Young, suffering from a cold, was unable to complete his leg.

Men

Athletes	Event	Qualification		Quarterfinals		Semifinals		Finals	
Athletes	Event	Time	Rank	Time	Rank	Time	Rank	Time	Rank
Andrew Musgrave	15 km individual	N/A						36:32.4	55
Andrew Musgrave	30 km pursuit	N/A						1:24:07.9	51
Andrew Musgrave	Sprint	3:58.43	58	did not advance					
Andrew Young	15 km individual	N/A						38:45.1	74
Andrew Young	Sprint	4:02.19	60	did not advance					
Andrew Musgrave, Andrew Young	Team sprint	N/A				did not finish		did not advance	

Women

Athlete	Event	Final	
Athlete	Event	Time	Rank
Fiona Hughes	10 km individual	30:29.8	68

== Curling ==
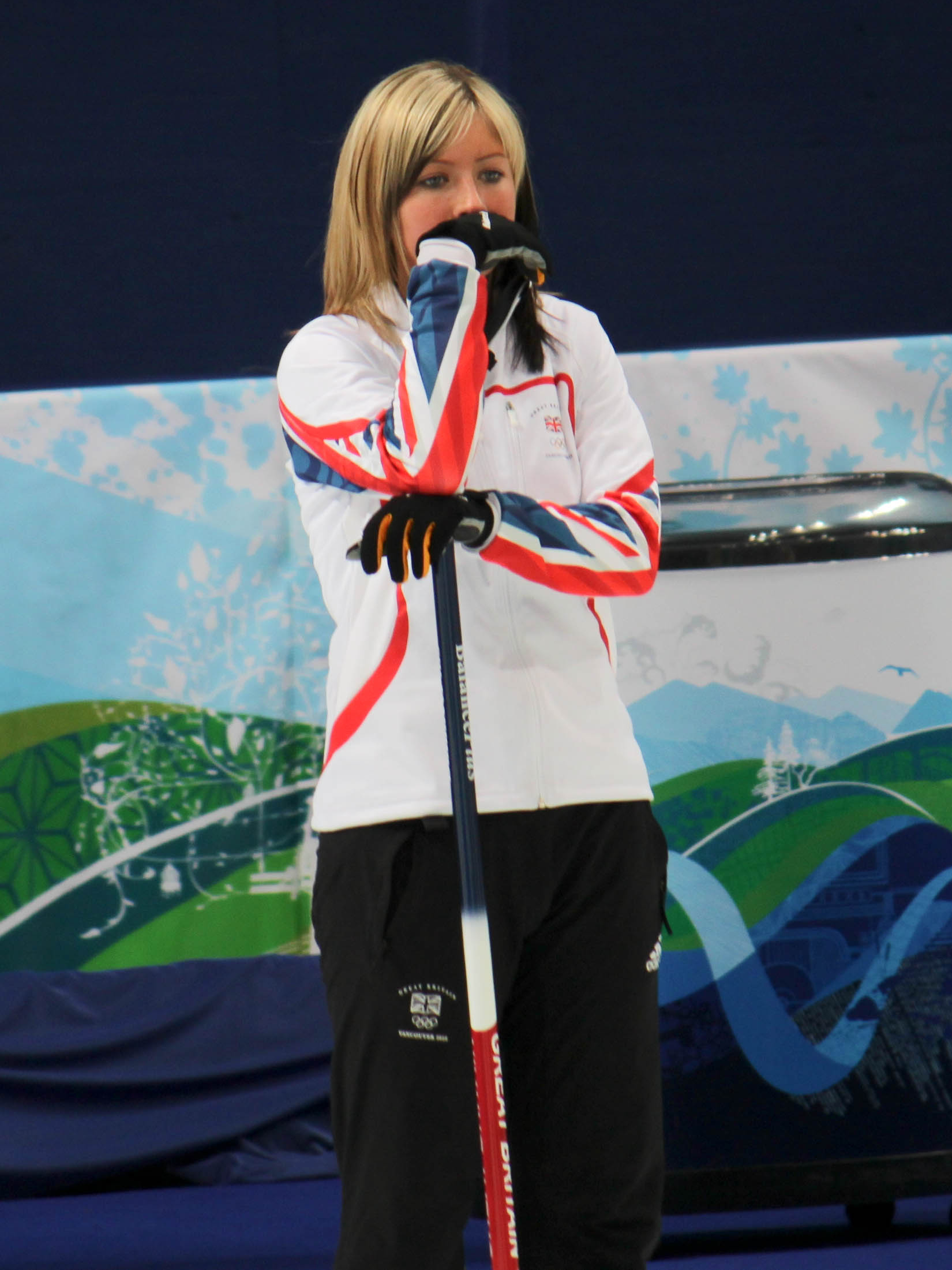
Eve Muirhead, the 19-year-old skip of the women's team.

Curling events at the 2010 Winter Olympics were in the form of a round-robin tournament; each nation played all others in a group stage with the top four qualifying for medal playoffs. The men's team, the reigning world champions, won group stage games against France, Denmark, China, United States and Germany. These five wins left them in a tie for the last semifinal place with Sweden, who beat them in their group game. A single tiebreaker match was played between the two sides which was won by the Swedes in the first extra end. The women's team, skippered by 19-year-old Eve Muirhead, entered the tournament ranked seventh in the world and beat world champions China in their opening match, but won just two of their remaining eight games to finish seventh in the group and miss out on the semifinals.

=== Men's tournament ===
Men's team

Lockerbie CC (curling club), Lockerbie

- Skip: David Murdoch
- Third: Ewan MacDonald
- Second: Peter Smith
- Lead: Euan Byers
- Alternate: Graeme Connal

Results

Round-robin

Draw 1

Sheet A	1	2	3	4	5	6	7	8	9	10	Final
Great Britain (Murdoch) 🔨	0	1	0	0	0	0	1	0	2	0	**4**
**Sweden (Edin)**	0	0	2	0	0	1	0	2	0	1	**6**

Draw 3

Sheet A	1	2	3	4	5	6	7	8	9	10	Final
**Great Britain (Murdoch) 🔨**	1	2	1	0	2	0	0	1	2	x	**9**
France (Dufour)	0	0	0	2	0	1	1	0	0	x	**4**

Draw 4

Sheet D	1	2	3	4	5	6	7	8	9	10	Final
Great Britain (Murdoch)	1	0	0	2	0	0	0	0	0	0	**3**
**Switzerland (Stöckli) 🔨**	0	0	2	0	0	0	0	1	0	1	**4**

Draw 5

Sheet B	1	2	3	4	5	6	7	8	9	10	Final
**Great Britain (Murdoch) 🔨**	0	0	2	0	1	0	0	3	0	3	**9**
Denmark (Schmidt)	0	1	0	1	0	2	0	0	2	0	**6**

Draw 7

Sheet C	1	2	3	4	5	6	7	8	9	10	Final
China (Wang)	0	0	1	0	1	0	0	2	0	x	**4**
**Great Britain (Murdoch) 🔨**	1	0	0	2	0	3	2	0	1	x	**9**

Draw 8

Sheet D	1	2	3	4	5	6	7	8	9	10	Final
**Canada (Martin) 🔨**	0	2	0	1	0	2	0	0	0	2	**7**
Great Britain (Murdoch)	0	0	3	0	1	0	1	1	0	0	**6**

Draw 9

Sheet A	1	2	3	4	5	6	7	8	9	10	Final
United States (Shuster) 🔨	0	1	0	0	0	0	0	1	0	0	**2**
**Great Britain (Murdoch)**	0	0	0	0	2	1	0	0	0	1	**4**

Draw 11

Sheet B	1	2	3	4	5	6	7	8	9	10	Final
Germany (Kapp)	0	0	0	0	1	0	1	0	x	x	**2**
**Great Britain (Murdoch) 🔨**	1	0	1	2	0	2	0	2	x	x	**8**

Draw 12

Sheet C	1	2	3	4	5	6	7	8	9	10	Final
Great Britain (Murdoch) 🔨	0	3	0	1	0	0	0	1	x	x	**5**
**Norway (Ulsrud)**	2	0	2	0	2	0	3	0	x	x	**9**

Tiebreaker

Having finished level with Sweden with five wins Great Britain faced a single match tiebreaker to decide who advanced to the semifinals.

Sheet A	1	2	3	4	5	6	7	8	9	10	11	Final
**Sweden (Edin) 🔨**	2	0	2	1	0	0	0	1	0	0	1	**7**
Great Britain (Murdoch)	0	2	0	0	1	1	1	0	0	1	0	**6**

Standings

Final round robin standings
Team	Skip	Pld	W	L	PF	PA	EW	EL	BE	SE	S%	Qualification
Canada	Kevin Martin	9	9	0	75	36	36	28	14	2	85%	Playoffs
Norway	Thomas Ulsrud	9	7	2	64	43	40	32	15	7	84%	Playoffs
Switzerland	Ralph Stöckli	9	6	3	53	44	35	33	20	8	81%	Playoffs
Sweden	Niklas Edin	9	5	4	50	52	34	36	20	6	82%	Tiebreaker
Great Britain	David Murdoch	9	5	4	57	44	35	29	20	9	81%	Tiebreaker
Germany	Andy Kapp	9	4	5	48	60	35	38	11	9	75%	
France	Thomas Dufour	9	3	6	37	63	22	34	16	7	73%	
China	Wang Fengchun	9	2	7	52	60	37	37	9	7	77%	
Denmark	Ulrik Schmidt	9	2	7	45	63	31	29	12	6	78%	
United States	John Shuster	9	2	7	43	59	32	41	18	9	76%	

=== Women's tournament ===
Women's team

- Skip: Eve Muirhead
- Third: Jackie Lockhart
- Second: Kelly Wood
- Lead: Lorna Vevers
- Alternate: Anne Laird

Results

Draw 2

Sheet A	1	2	3	4	5	6	7	8	9	10	11	Final
China (Wang)	0	1	0	0	0	0	0	1	0	2	0	**4**
**Great Britain (Muirhead) 🔨**	0	0	0	1	2	0	0	0	1	0	1	**5**

Draw 3

Sheet B	1	2	3	4	5	6	7	8	9	10	Final
Great Britain (Muirhead)	0	0	1	0	1	0	1	0	1	0	**4**
**Sweden (Norberg) 🔨**	1	1	0	2	0	0	0	1	0	1	**6**

Draw 4

Sheet C	1	2	3	4	5	6	7	8	9	10	Final
Russia (Privivkova) 🔨	0	0	1	1	0	0	1	0	x	x	**3**
**Great Britain (Muirhead)**	2	3	0	0	2	2	0	1	x	x	**10**

Draw 5

Sheet A	1	2	3	4	5	6	7	8	9	10	Final
Germany (Schöpp)	1	0	0	0	2	0	0	1	0	x	**4**
**Great Britain (Muirhead) 🔨**	0	1	1	1	0	0	1	0	3	x	**7**

Draw 6

Sheet C	1	2	3	4	5	6	7	8	9	10	Final
Great Britain (Muirhead)	0	0	1	0	2	0	0	1	0	x	**4**
**Japan (Meguro) 🔨**	1	0	0	3	0	1	1	0	5	x	**11**

Draw 7

Sheet B	1	2	3	4	5	6	7	8	9	10	11	Final
**United States (McCormick)**	0	0	0	1	1	1	0	0	1	1	1	**6**
Great Britain (Muirhead) 🔨	1	0	2	0	0	0	2	0	0	0	0	**5**

Draw 8

Sheet A	1	2	3	4	5	6	7	8	9	10	Final
Great Britain (Muirhead)	0	1	0	0	1	0	3	1	0	x	**6**
**Switzerland (Ott) 🔨**	2	0	2	4	0	1	0	0	1	x	**10**

Draw 10

Sheet D	1	2	3	4	5	6	7	8	9	10	Final
Great Britain (Muirhead)	0	3	0	2	0	1	0	1	0	1	**8**
**Denmark (Jensen) 🔨**	1	0	2	0	1	0	3	0	2	0	**9**

Draw 11

Sheet D	1	2	3	4	5	6	7	8	9	10	11	Final
**Canada (Bernard)**	0	1	0	1	0	1	1	1	0	0	1	**6**
Great Britain (Muirhead) 🔨	0	0	2	0	0	0	0	0	2	1	0	**5**

Standings

Final round robin standings
Team	Skip	Pld	W	L	PF	PA	EW	EL	BE	SE	S%	Qualification
Canada	Cheryl Bernard	9	8	1	56	37	40	29	20	13	81%	Playoffs
Sweden	Anette Norberg	9	7	2	56	52	36	36	13	5	79%	Playoffs
China	Wang Bingyu	9	6	3	61	47	39	37	12	7	74%	Playoffs
Switzerland	Mirjam Ott	9	6	3	67	48	40	36	7	12	76%	Playoffs
Denmark	Angelina Jensen	9	4	5	49	61	31	40	15	5	74%	
Germany	Andrea Schöpp	9	3	6	52	56	35	40	15	4	75%	
Great Britain	Eve Muirhead	9	3	6	54	59	36	41	11	10	75%	
Japan	Moe Meguro	9	3	6	64	70	36	37	13	5	73%	
Russia	Liudmila Privivkova	9	3	6	53	60	36	40	14	13	77%	
United States	Debbie McCormick	9	2	7	43	65	36	36	12	12	77%	

== Figure skating ==
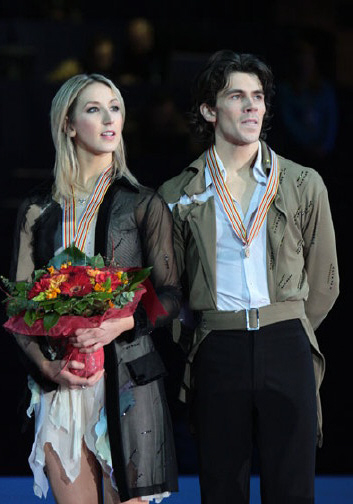
Sinead and John Kerr, who finished eighth in the ice dancing, on the podium at the 2009 European Figure Skating Championships.

Great Britain had qualified seven athletes; one in ladies singles, one pair in the pairs skating, and two pairs in ice dancing. The team was announced as Jenna McCorkell in the ladies singles, Stacey Kemp and David King in the pairs and in the ice dancing Sinead Kerr and John Kerr, and Penny Coomes and Nicholas Buckland. Brother and sister pairing Sinead and John Kerr were considered medal contenders before the Games as they entered the event ranked fifth in the world. The pair, who came third in the 2009 European Championships, went on to finish eighth.

Athlete(s)	Event	CD		SP/OD		FS/FD		Total	
Athlete(s)	Event	Points	Rank	Points	Rank	Points	Rank	Points	Rank
Jenna McCorkell	Ladies'	N/A		40.64	29	did not advance			29
Stacey Kemp, David King	Pairs	N/A		48.28	16	91.66	16	139.94	16
Sinead Kerr, John Kerr	Ice dancing	37.02	8	56.76	8	92.23	9	186.01	8
Penny Coomes, Nicholas Buckland	Ice dancing	25.68	21	46.33	19	71.60	19	143.61	20

== Freestyle skiing ==
Three British women competed in freestyle skiing events, one each in the aerials, moguls and ski cross. Sarah Sauvey became the first Briton to compete in Olympic ski cross, as the sport was making its debut in Vancouver. She finished 34th in the qualifying rounds missing out on the medal rounds by two places.

Women's - Aerials and Moguls

Athlete	Event	Qualifying		Final	
Athlete	Event	Points	Rank	Points	Rank
Sarah Ainsworth	Aerials	105.36	22	did not advance	
Ellie Koyander	Moguls	18.98	24	did not advance	

Women's Ski cross

Athlete	Event	Qualifying		1/8 finals	Quarterfinals	Semifinals	Finals	
Athlete	Event	Time	Rank	Position	Position	Position	Position	Rank
Sarah Sauvey	Ski cross	1:24.52	34	did not advance				

== Luge ==
Britain's sole competitor in luge was Adam Rosen, an American-born athlete who had previously competed at the 2006 Games. The 25-year-old's 16th-place finished equalled his performance in Turin and was just one place off of the highest Winter Olympic finish by any British luger.

Athlete	Event	Runs								Final total	Final rank
Athlete	Event	Run 1	Rank	Run 2	Rank	Run 3	Rank	Run 4	Rank	Final total	Final rank
Adam Rosen	Men's singles	48.896 -	16 -	49.005 (1:37:901)	18 (16)	49.259 (2:27.160)	15 (15)	48.856 (3:16.016)	19 (16)	3:16.016	16

Cumulative time and standings given in brackets.

== Short track speed skating ==
Britain qualified six athletes in individual short track speed skating events. In the men's events four skaters competed, with Jon Eley racing at two distances; a team also qualified for the relay event. Eley achieved the squad's best individual finish, coming sixth in 500 metres, a position matched by the relay team. In the women's events Elise Christie raced in the 500, 1000 and 1500 metres and Sarah Lindsay also took part in the 500 metres but was disqualified in her heat following a clash with Canada's Jessica Gregg.

Men

Athlete	Event	Heat		Quarterfinal		Semifinal		Final		
Athlete	Event	Time	Position	Time	Position	Time	Position	Time	Position	Rank
Anthony Douglas	1500 m	2:16.622	4	N/A		did not advance				
Jon Eley	500 m	42.081	1 **Q**	41.875	1 **Q**	41.504	4 **QB**	42.681	3	6
Jon Eley	1000 m	1:25.588	4	N/A		did not advance				
Tom Iveson	1000 m	1:27.841	4	N/A		did not advance				
Jack Whelbourne	1500 m	2:14.972	3 **Q**	N/A		2:17.156	5	did not advance		
Paul Worth	500 m	42.936	3	N/A		did not advance				
Anthony Douglas; Jon Eley; Tom Iveson; Jack Whelbourne; Paul Worth	5000 m relay	N/A				6:50.618	4 **QB**	6:50.045	1	6

Women

Event	Athlete	Heat		Semifinal		Final	
Event	Athlete	Time	Position	Time	Position	Time	Position
Elise Christie	500 m	44.374	2 **Q**	44.821	3	did not advance	
Elise Christie	1000 m	1:31.363	3	did not advance			
Elise Christie	1500 m	2:23.898	4	did not advance			
Sarah Lindsay	500 m	44.716	2 **Q**	DSQ	4	did not advance	

Key: Q=Qualified for next round, QB=Qualified for B final

== Skeleton ==
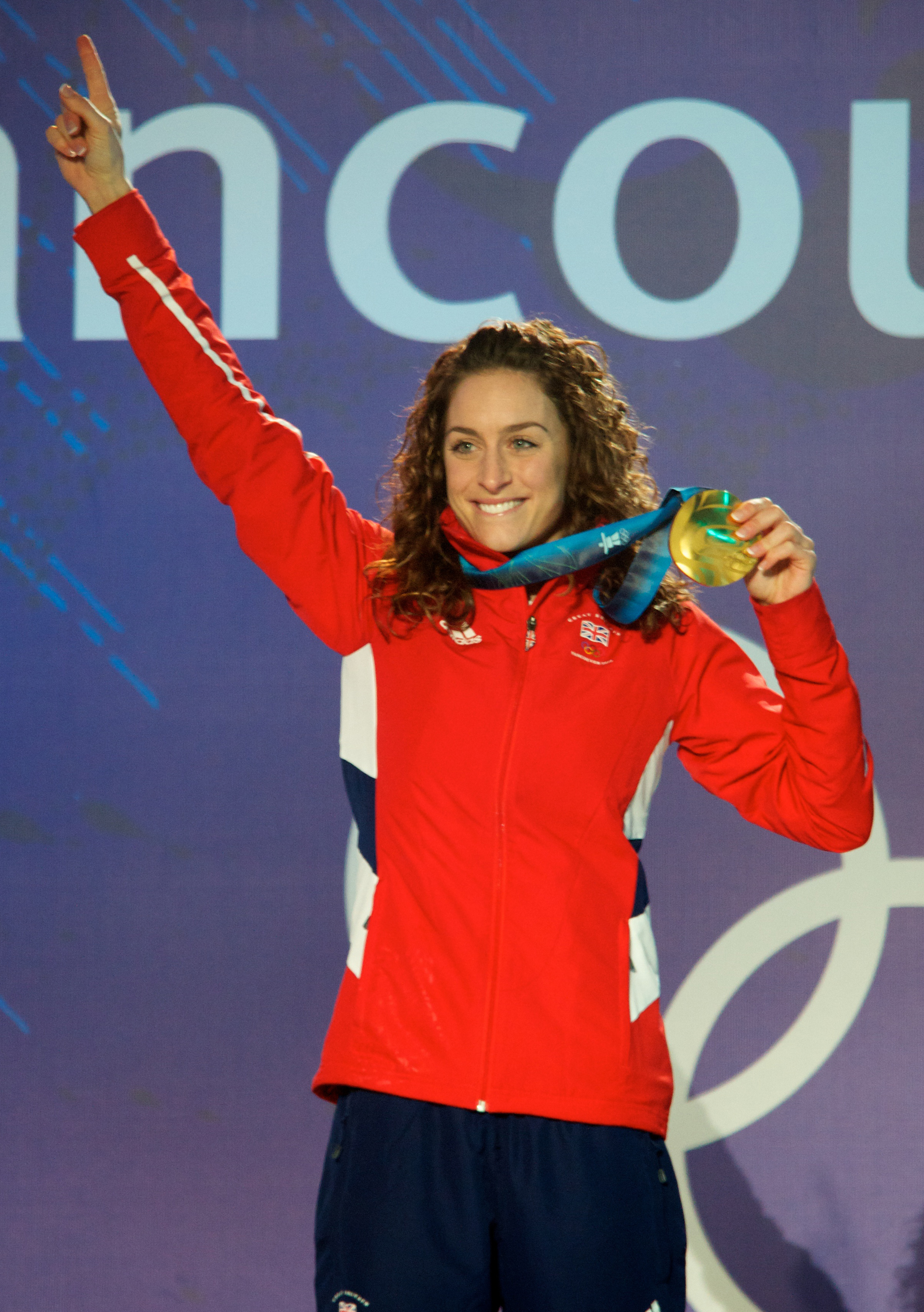
Women's skeleton gold medalist Amy Williams

Four British athletes qualified for the skeleton events. Amy Williams won Britain's only medal of the Games, a gold in the women's skeleton. Williams became the first British gold medalist in an individual event at the Winter Olympics for thirty years, following Robin Cousins' victory in figure skating at the 1980 Winter Olympics in Lake Placid, and the first British female individual Winter Olympics gold medalist since Jeannette Altwegg in 1952. Shelley Rudman, Britain's only medalist at the 2006 Olympics, finished sixth in the women's event and her fiancé, Kristan Bromley, finished in the same position in the men's event.

Athletes	Event	Final								Total	Final rank
Athletes	Event	Run 1	Rank	Run 2	Rank	Run 3	Rank	Run 4	Rank	Total	Final rank
Kristan Bromley	Men's skeleton	52.91 -	7 -	52.89 (1:45.80)	5 (5)	52.70 (2:38.50)	8 (6)	52.80 (3:31.30)	7 (6)	3:31.30	6
Adam Pengilly	Men's skeleton	53.75 -	17 -	54.17 (1:47.92)	22 (20)	53.36 (2:41.28)	18 (18)	52.23 (3:34.51)	14 (18)	3:34.51	18
Shelley Rudman	Women's skeleton	54.66 -	11 -	54.26 (1:48.92)	6 (7)	53.95 (2:42.87)	7 (7)	53.82 (3:36.69)	1 (6)	3:36.69	6
**Amy Williams**	Women's skeleton	53.83* -	1 -	54.13 (1:47.96)	2 (1)	53.68* (2:41.64)	1 (1)	54.00 (3:35.64)	4 (1)	3:35.64	1st place, gold medalist(s)

Cumulative time and standings given in brackets.

Key: * New track records

== Snowboarding ==
Four British snowboarders qualified for the Games. Ben Kilner qualified 7th and progressed through the semifinals, however finished 18th in the Final for the men's halfpipe. Reserve Marcijan Harasymiw crashed on his second run and did not advance due to injury. Zoe Gillings reached the semifinals of the women's snowboard cross and finished in eighth position overall.

Halfpipe

Athlete	Event	Qualification			Semifinals			Final		
Athlete	Event	Run 1	Run 2	Rank	Run 1	Run 2	Rank	Run 1	Run 2	Rank
Ben Kilner	Men's halfpipe	21.5	**32.1**	7 **Q**	3.1	**17.0**	12	did not advance		18
Lesley McKenna	Women's halfpipe	**5.1**	2.8	30	did not advance					

Parallel giant slalom

Athlete	Event	Qualification		1/8 finals	Quarterfinals	Semifinals	Finals	
Athlete	Event	Time	Rank	Opposition margin	Opposition margin	Opposition margin	Opposition margin	Rank
Marcijan Harasymiw	Men's parallel giant slalom	1:21.09	24	did not advance				

Snowboard cross

Athletes	Event	Qualification		Quarterfinals	Semifinals	Small final	Rank
Athletes	Event	Time	Rank	Position	Position	Position	Rank
Zoe Gillings	Women's snowboard cross	1:27.93	8 **Q**	2 **Q**	3	4	8

== See also ==
- Great Britain at the 2010 Winter Paralympics
