= 2011 European Short Track Speed Skating Championships =

- Venue: Heerenveen, Netherlands
- Dates: 14-16 January

The 2011 European Short Track Speed Skating Championships took place between 14 and 16 January 2011 in Heerenveen, Netherlands.

The original winner in men's competition was Thibaut Fauconnet of France but he was later disqualified for doping offence.

== Medal summary ==
=== Medal table ===
* Host nation (Netherlands)

Rank	Nation	Gold	Silver	Bronze	Total
1	Italy	4	0	2	6
2	Netherlands*	3	1	1	5
3	Latvia	2	1	1	4
4	Great Britain	1	1	1	3
5	Hungary	0	3	2	5
6	Russia	0	2	2	4
7	Austria	0	1	0	1
7	Poland	0	1	0	1
9	Bulgaria	0	0	1	1
Totals (9 entries)		10	10	10	30

=== Men's events ===
Event	Gold		Silver		Bronze	
500 metres	Jack Whelbourne (GBR)	42.369	Haralds Silovs (LAT)	42.376	Sjinkie Knegt (NED)	42.506
1000 metres	Haralds Silovs (LAT)	1:26.942	Jack Whelbourne (GBR)	1:27.301	Ruslan Zakharov (RUS)	1:53.610
1500 metres	Sjinkie Knegt (NED)	2:16.733	Ruslan Zakharov (RUS)	2:16.921	Haralds Silovs (LAT)	2:17.829
5000 metre relay	Netherlands; Daan Breeuwsma; Niels Kerstholt; Freek van der Wart; Sjinkie Knegt	6:54.608	Russia; Vladimir Grigorev; Ruslan Zakharov; Sergei Prankevitch; Evgeniy Kozulin; Semion Elistratov	6:54.726	Great Britain; Jon Eley; Richard Shoebridge; Paul Stanley; Anthony Douglas; Jack Whelbourne	6:56.025
Overall Classification	Haralds Silovs (LAT)	50 pts.	Sjinkie Knegt (NED)	47 pts.	Ruslan Zakharov (RUS)	42 pts.

=== Women's events ===
Event	Gold		Silver		Bronze	
500 metres	Martina Valcepina (ITA)	45.457	Patrycja Maliszewska (POL)	45.550	Bernadett Heidum (HUN)	45.623
1000 metres	Arianna Fontana (ITA)	1:35.209	Bernadett Heidum (HUN)	1:35.356	Marina Georgieva-Nikolova (BUL)	1:35.528
1500 metres	Arianna Fontana (ITA)	2:29.292	Veronika Windisch (AUT)	2:29.610	Erika Huszár (HUN)	2:29.941
3000 metre relay	Netherlands; Jorien ter Mors; Sanne van Kerkhof; Annita van Doorn; Yara van Kerkhof	4:19.253	Hungary; Rózsa Darázs; Bernadett Heidum; Erika Huszár; Andrea Keszler; Szandra Lajtos	4:19.284	Italy; Arianna Fontana; Cecilia Maffei; Lucia Peretti; Martina Valcepina; Elena Viviani	4:20.473
Overall Classification	Arianna Fontana (ITA)	115 pts.	Bernadett Heidum (HUN)	42 pts.	Martina Valcepina (ITA)	39 pts.

== Participating nations ==
- Austria
- Belarus
- Belgium
- Bosnia and Herzegovina
- Bulgaria
- Czech Republic
- France
- Germany
- Great Britain
- Hungary
- Israel
- Italy
- Latvia
- Lithuania
- Netherlands
- Poland
- Romania
- Russia
- Slovakia
- Spain
- Turkey
- Ukraine

== See also ==
- Short track speed skating
- European Short Track Speed Skating Championships
