= 2008 European Short Track Speed Skating Championships =

- Venue: Ventspils, Latvia
- Dates: 18–20 January

The 2008 European Short Track Speed Skating Championships took place between 18 and 20 January 2008 in Ventspils, Latvia.

== Medal summary ==
=== Medal table ===
* Host nation (Latvia)

Rank	Nation	Gold	Silver	Bronze	Total
1	Italy	3	2	1	6
2	Great Britain	2	1	0	3
2	Latvia*	2	1	0	3
2	Netherlands	2	1	0	3
5	Bulgaria	1	2	1	4
6	Russia	0	2	3	5
7	Hungary	0	1	1	2
8	Germany	0	0	2	2
9	Czech Republic	0	0	1	1
9	France	0	0	1	1
Totals (10 entries)		10	10	10	30

=== Men's events ===
Event	Gold		Silver		Bronze	
500 metres	Jon Eley (GBR)	42.945	Nicola Rodigari (ITA)	43.073	Tyson Heung (GER)	43.161
1000 metres	Niels Kerstholt (NED)	1:26.625	Haralds Silovs (LAT)	1:26.659	Gábor Galambos (HUN)	1:27.192
1500 metres	Haralds Silovs (LAT)	2:16.377	Vyacheslav Kurginyan (RUS)	2:16.471	Ruslan Zakharov (RUS)	2:16.545
5000 metre relay	Italy; Fabio Carta; Yuri Confortola; Nicola Rodigari; Roberto Serra; Claudio Rinaldi	6:57.853	Great Britain; Jon Eley; Tom Iveson; Paul Stanley; Paul Worth; Anthony Douglas	6:58.408	France; Maxime Chataignier; Thibaut Fauconnet; Jeremy Masson; Stéphane Périer	6:59.256
Overall Classification	Haralds Silovs (LAT)	89 pts.	Niels Kerstholt (NED)	47 pts.	Nicola Rodigari (ITA)	42 pts.

=== Women's events ===
Event	Gold		Silver		Bronze	
500 metres	Annita van Doorn (NED)	46.072	Erika Huszár (HUN)	46.076	Evgenia Radanova (BUL)	46.115
1000 metres	Evgenia Radanova (BUL)	1:38.046	Arianna Fontana (ITA)	1:38.059	Nina Evteeva (RUS)	1:38.532
1500 metres	Arianna Fontana (ITA)	2:28.559	Nina Evteeva (RUS)	2:28.990	Kateřina Novotná (CZE)	2:29.059
3000 metre relay	Great Britain; Elise Christie; Charlotte Gilmartin; Sarah Lindsay; Joanna Williams; Alex Whelbourne	4:23.172	Bulgaria; Daniela Ivanova; Marina Georgieva-Nikolova; Gergana Patsova; Evgenia Radanova	4:23.243	Germany; Tina Grassow; Aika Klein; Christin Priebst; Susanne Rudolph	4:23.417
Overall Classification	Arianna Fontana (ITA)	89 pts.	Evgenia Radanova (BUL)	58 pts.	Nina Evteeva (RUS)	47 pts.

== Participating nations ==
- Austria
- Belgium
- Bosnia and Herzegovina
- Belarus
- Bulgaria
- Croatia
- Czech Republic
- France
- Germany
- Great Britain
- Hungary
- Israel
- Italy
- Latvia
- Lithuania
- Netherlands
- Poland
- Romania
- Russia
- Serbia
- Slovenia
- Slovakia
- Sweden
- Switzerland
- Ukraine

== See also ==
- Short track speed skating
- European Short Track Speed Skating Championships
