= 2009–10 ISU Short Track Speed Skating World Cup =

International speed skating competition

ISU Short Track World Cup
- Dates: 2009 – 2010

The 2009–10 Short Track Speed Skating World Cup was a multi-race tournament over a season for short track speed skating. The season began on 17 September 2009 and ended on 15 November 2009. The World Cup was organised by the ISU who also ran world cups and championships in speed skating and figure skating.

The World Cup consisted of just four competitions this year (rather than six) due to the 2010 Winter Olympics in Vancouver.

== Calendar ==
=== Men ===
==== China ====
Date	Place	Distance	Winner	Second	Third
19 September 2009	(China) Beijing	500m	(South Korea) Kwak Yoon-Gi	(South Korea) Sung Si-Bak	(United States) Jeff Simon
19 September 2009	(China) Beijing	1500m	(South Korea) Sung Si-Bak	(South Korea) Lee Ho-Suk	(South Korea) Lee Jung-Su
20 September 2009	(China) Beijing	1000m	(South Korea) Lee Jung-Su	(Canada) Charles Hamelin	(South Korea) Kim Seoung Il
20 September 2009	(China) Beijing	5000m relay	South Korea	China	Canada

==== South Korea ====
Date	Place	Distance	Winner	Second	Third
26 September 2009	(South Korea) Mokdong Ice Rink, Seoul	500m	(Canada) Charles Hamelin	(China) Han Jialiang	(South Korea) Lee Ho-Suk
26 September 2009	(South Korea) Mokdong Ice Rink, Seoul	1500m	(South Korea) Lee Ho-Suk	(South Korea) Lee Jung-Su	(South Korea) Kim Seoung Il
27 September 2009	(South Korea) Mokdong Ice Rink, Seoul	1000m	(South Korea) Lee Ho-Suk	(United States) Jordan Malone	(South Korea) Kwak Yoon-Gy
27 September 2009	(South Korea) Mokdong Ice Rink, Seoul	5000m relay	South Korea	Canada	China

==== Canada ====
Date	Place	Distance	Winner	Second	Third
7 November 2009	(Canada) Maurice Richard Arena, Montreal	500m	(Canada) Charles Hamelin	(United States) Apolo Anton Ohno	(United States) Jeff Simon
7 November 2009	(Canada) Maurice Richard Arena, Montreal	1500m	(Canada) Charles Hamelin	(South Korea) Sung Si-Bak	(United States) Travis Jayner
8 November 2009	(Canada) Maurice Richard Arena, Montreal	1000m	(South Korea) Sung Si-Bak	(South Korea) Lee Jung-Su	(Canada) Charles Hamelin
8 November 2009	(Canada) Maurice Richard Arena, Montreal	5000m relay	South Korea	Canada	China

==== United States ====
Date	Place	Distance	Winner	Second	Third
14 November 2009	(United States) Berry Events Center, Marquette	500m	(Canada) François-Louis Tremblay	(France) Thibault Fauconnet	(South Korea) Sung Si-Bak
14 November 2009	(United States) Berry Events Center, Marquette	1500m	(South Korea) Lee Jung-Su	(United States) Apolo Anton Ohno	(Canada) Charles Hamelin
15 November 2009	(United States) Berry Events Center, Marquette	1000m	(United States) Apolo Anton Ohno	(South Korea) Lee Jung-Su	(Canada) François Hamelin
15 November 2009	(United States) Berry Events Center, Marquette	5000m relay	Canada	United States	South Korea

=== Women ===
==== China ====
Date	Place	Distance	Winner	Second	Third
19 September 2009	(China) Beijing	500m	(China) Wang Meng	(Canada) Jessica Gregg	(Canada) Marianne St-Gelais
19 September 2009	(China) Beijing	1500m	(China) Zhou Yang	(South Korea) Lee Eun-Byul	(United States) Katherine Reutter
20 September 2009	(China) Beijing	1000m	(United States) Katherine Reutter	(South Korea) Lee Eun-Byul	(United States) Jessica Smith
20 September 2009	(China) Beijing	3000m relay	South Korea	United States	Canada

==== South Korea ====
Date	Place	Distance	Winner	Second	Third
26 September 2009	(South Korea) Mokdong Ice Rink, Seoul	500m	(China) Wang Meng	(China) Zhao Nannan	(Canada) Kalyna Roberge
26 September 2009	(South Korea) Mokdong Ice Rink, Seoul	1500m	(South Korea) Lee Eun-Byul	(China) Sun Linlin	(China) Zhou Yang
27 September 2009	(South Korea) Mokdong Ice Rink, Seoul	1000m	(South Korea) Cho Ha-Ri	(China) Wang Meng	(South Korea) Park Seung-Hi
27 September 2009	(South Korea) Mokdong Ice Rink, Seoul	3000m relay	China	Japan	Canada

==== Canada ====
Date	Place	Distance	Winner	Second	Third
7 November 2009	(Canada) Maurice Richard Arena, Montreal	500m	(China) Wang Meng	(Canada) Kalyna Roberge	(China) Zhao Nannan
7 November 2009	(Canada) Maurice Richard Arena, Montreal	1500m	(United States) Katherine Reutter	(South Korea) Cho Ha-Ri	(China) Liu Qiohong
8 November 2009	(Canada) Maurice Richard Arena, Montreal	1000m	(China) Zhou Yang	(China) Wang Meng	(China) Liu Qiohong
8 November 2009	(Canada) Maurice Richard Arena, Montreal	3000m relay	China	United States	Canada

==== United States ====
Date	Place	Distance	Winner	Second	Third
14 November 2009	(United States) Berry Events Center, Marquette	500m	(China) Wang Meng	(Canada) Kalyna Roberge	(Canada) Marianne St-Gelais
14 November 2009	(United States) Berry Events Center, Marquette	1500m	(China) Zhou Yang	(China) Liu Qiuhong	(South Korea) Lee Eun-Byul
15 November 2009	(United States) Berry Events Center, Marquette	1000m	(China) Wang Meng	(United States) Katherine Reutter	(South Korea) Park Seung-Hi
15 November 2009	(United States) Berry Events Center, Marquette	3000m relay	China	South Korea	Canada

== Overall standings ==
- note: the overall standings are a combination of the athletes best three results over the season

=== Men ===
Distance	Winner	Second	Third
500m	(Canada) Charles Hamelin 2328	(Canada) François-Louis Tremblay 2024	(South Korea) Sung Si-Bak 1608
1000m	(South Korea) Lee Jung-Su 2600	(United States) Apolo Anton Ohno 1722	(Canada) Charles Hamelin 1650
1500m	(South Korea) Lee Jung-Su 2440	(Canada) Charles Hamelin 2152	(South Korea) Sung Si-Bak 1869
5000m relay	South Korea 3000	Canada 2600	China 2080

=== Women ===
Distance	Winner	Second	Third
500m	(China) Wang Meng 3000	(Canada) Kalyna Roberge 2240	(China) Zhao Nannan 1952
1000m	(China) Wang Meng 2600	(United States) Katherine Reutter 2312	(China) Zhou Yang 1738
1500m	(China) Zhou Yang 2640	(South Korea) Lee Eun-Byul 2440	(United States) Katherine Reutter 1968
3000m relay	China 3000	South Korea 2210	United States 2112
