= 2008 World Short Track Speed Skating Team Championships =

- Location: Harbin, China
- Start date: 15 March 2008
- End date: 16 March 2008

The 2008 World Short Track Speed Skating Team Championships was the 18th edition of the World Short Track Speed Skating Team Championships, which took place on 15-16 March 2008 in Harbin, China.

Teams were divided into two brackets of four: the best team from each bracket qualified directly for the final, while the two next teams entered for the repechage round and the last was eliminated. The best two teams in the repechage round qualified for the final. Thus, the final consisted of four teams. Each team was represented by four athletes at both 500 m and 1000 m as well as by two athletes at 3000 m. There were four heats at both 500 m and 1000 m, whereby each heat consisted of athletes representing different countries. There was one heat at 3000 m.

== Medal winners ==
Event	Gold	Silver	Bronze
Men	United States; Apolo Anton Ohno; J.P. Kepka; Charles Leveille; Jordan Malone; Jeff Simon	Canada; Steve Robillard; Jean-François Monette; Charles Hamelin; Marc-André Monette; François Hamelin	South Korea; Song Kyung-Taek; Sung Si-Bak; Lee Ho-Suk; Kwak Yoon-Gy; Lee Seung-Hoon
Women	China; Wang Meng; Fu Tianyu; Zhou Yang; Liu Qiuhong; Zhao Nannan	South Korea; Kim Min-Jung; Jung Eun-Ju; Park Seung-Hi; Shin Sae-Bom; Yang Shin-Young	Canada; Amanda Overland; Anne Maltais; Tania Vicent; Jessica Gregg; Kalyna Roberge

== Results ==
=== Men ===
Rank	Nation	Total
1st place, gold medalist(s)	United States	38
2nd place, silver medalist(s)	Canada	32
3rd place, bronze medalist(s)	South Korea	30
4	China	18
5	Japan	Rep.
6	Italy	Rep.
7	Russia	DNQ
8	United Kingdom	DNQ

=== Women ===
Rank	Nation	Total
1st place, gold medalist(s)	China	45
2nd place, silver medalist(s)	South Korea	35
3rd place, bronze medalist(s)	Canada	27
4	United States	14
5	Italy	Rep.
6	Bulgaria	Rep.
7	Japan	DNQ
8	Russia	DNQ
