= 2009 World Short Track Speed Skating Team Championships =

- Location: Heerenveen, Netherlands
- Start date: 14 March 2009
- End date: 15 March 2009
- Competitors: 79 from 8 nations

The 2009 World Short Track Speed Skating Team Championships was the 19th edition of the World Short Track Speed Skating Team Championships, which took place on 14-15 March 2009 in Heerenveen, Netherlands.

Teams were divided into two brackets of four: the best team from each bracket qualified directly for the final, while the two next teams entered for the repechage round and the last was eliminated. The best two teams in the repechage round qualified for the final. Thus, the final consisted of four teams. Each team was represented by four athletes at both 500 m and 1000 m as well as by two athletes at 3000 m. There were four heats at both 500 m and 1000 m, whereby each heat consisted of athletes representing different countries. There was one heat at 3000 m.

== Medal winners ==
Event	Gold	Silver	Bronze
Men	South Korea; Lee Jung-su; Sung Si-bak; Lee Ho-suk; Kwak Yoon-gy; Park Jin-hwan	Canada; François-Louis Tremblay; Marc-André Monette; Charles Hamelin; Olivier Jean; François Hamelin	United States; Apolo Anton Ohno; Travis Jayner; Jordan Malone; John Celski; Jeff Simon
Women	China; Wang Meng; Fu Tianyu; Zhou Yang; Liu Qiuhong; Zhang Hui	South Korea; Kim Min-jung; Jung Ba-ra; Yang Shin-young; Shin Sae-bom	United States; Jessica Smith; Kimberly Derrick; Lana Gehring; Katherine Reutter; Alyson Dudek

== Results ==
=== Men ===
Rank	Nation	Total
1st place, gold medalist(s)	South Korea	36
2nd place, silver medalist(s)	Canada	34
3rd place, bronze medalist(s)	United States	27
4	China	21
5	Japan	Rep.
6	Germany	Rep.
7	Italy	DNQ
8	Netherlands	DNQ

=== Women ===
Rank	Nation	Total
1st place, gold medalist(s)	China	46
2nd place, silver medalist(s)	South Korea	29
3rd place, bronze medalist(s)	United States	24
4	Canada	22
5	Italy	Rep.
6	Netherlands	Rep.
7	Germany	DNQ
8	Japan	DNQ
