= Short-track speed skating at the 2010 Winter Olympics – Women's 500 metres =

Women's 500 metres at the XXI Olympic Winter Games
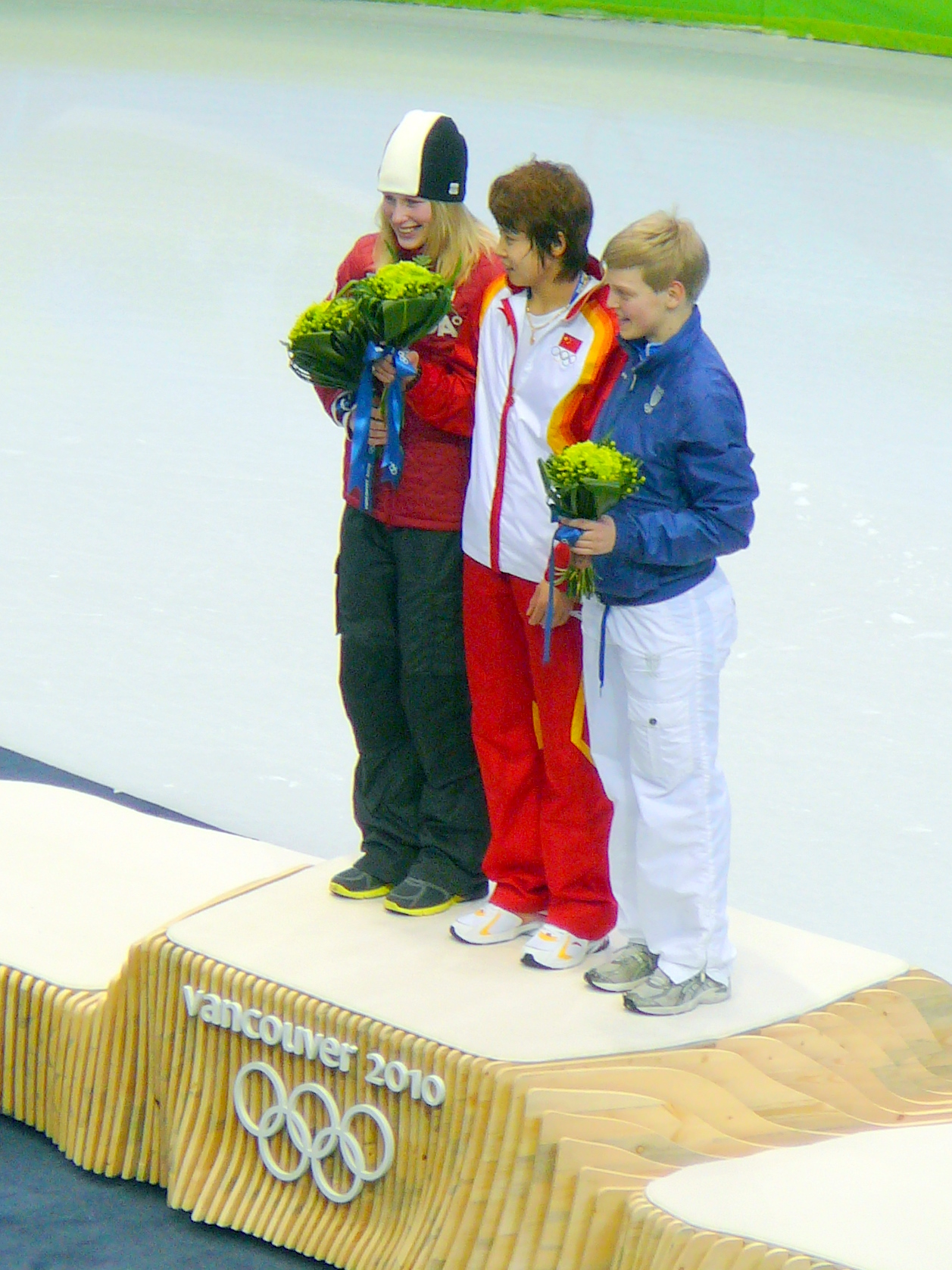
- The presentation of the medals in the 500 metres Women's events. From left: Marianne St-Gelais, Wang Meng, and Arianna Fontana
- Venue: Pacific Coliseum
- Dates: February 13, 17, 2010
- Competitors: 32 from 17 nations
- Winning time: 43.048

Medalists
1st place, gold medalist(s)		Wang Meng	China
2nd place, silver medalist(s)		Marianne St-Gelais	Canada
3rd place, bronze medalist(s)		Arianna Fontana	Italy

The women's 500 metres in short track speed skating at the 2010 Winter Olympics began on 13 February, with the final held on 17 February, at the Pacific Coliseum.

== Results ==
=== Heats ===
Rank	Heat	Name	Country	Time	Notes
1	1	Katherine Reutter	United States	44.187	Q
2	1	Cho Ha-ri	South Korea	44.313	Q
3	1	Stéphanie Bouvier	France	44.376	
4	1	Aika Klein	Germany	45.186	
1	2	Marianne St-Gelais	Canada	44.708	Q
2	2	Sarah Lindsay	Great Britain	44.716	Q
3	2	Tatiana Borodulina	Australia	44.901	
4	2	Valeriya Potemkina	Russia	44.952	
1	3	Wang Meng	China	43.926	Q, OR
2	3	Kateřina Novotná	Czech Republic	44.614	Q
3	3	Cecilia Maffei	Italy	44.948	
4	3	Patrycja Maliszewska	Poland	58.649	
1	4	Lee Eun-byul	South Korea	44.000	Q
2	4	Jessica Gregg	Canada	44.009	Q
3	4	Jorien ter Mors	Netherlands	45.120	
4	4	Martina Valcepina	Italy	1:08.173	
1	5	Arianna Fontana	Italy	44.482	Q
2	5	Alyson Dudek	United States	44.560	Q
3	5	Annita van Doorn	Netherlands	44.751	
4	5	Biba Sakurai	Japan	45.146	
1	6	Zhou Yang	China	44.115	Q
2	6	Kalyna Roberge	Canada	44.254	Q
3	6	Yui Sakai	Japan	44.341	
4	6	Liesbeth Mau Asam	Netherlands	45.135	
1	7	Park Seung-hi	South Korea	44.221	Q
2	7	Elise Christie	Great Britain	44.374	Q
3	7	Erika Huszar	Hungary	44.537	
–	7	Marina Georgieva-Nikolova	Bulgaria		DSQ
1	8	Evgenia Radanova	Bulgaria	45.125	Q
2	8	Veronique Pierron	France	45.218	Q
3	8	Han Yueshuang	Hong Kong	48.625	
4	8	Zhao Nannan	China	1:02.132	

=== Quarterfinals ===
Rank	Heat	Name	Country	Time	Notes
1	1	Katherine Reutter	United States	43.834	Q, OR
2	1	Kalyna Roberge	Canada	44.143	Q
3	1	Kateřina Novotná	Czech Republic	44.438	
–	1	Park Seung-hi	South Korea		DSQ
1	2	Wang Meng	China	43.284	Q, OR
2	2	Jessica Gregg	Canada	43.956	Q
3	2	Evgenia Radanova	Bulgaria	44.047	
–	2	Sarah Lindsay	Great Britain		DSQ
1	3	Zhou Yang	China	44.106	Q
2	3	Arianna Fontana	Italy	44.257	Q
3	3	Cho Ha-ri	South Korea	44.306	
4	3	Alyson Dudek	United States	44.588	
1	4	Marianne St-Gelais	Canada	44.316	Q
2	4	Lee Eun-byul	South Korea	44.582	Q
3	4	Elise Christie	Great Britain	44.821	
4	4	Veronique Pierron	France	1:10.899	

=== Semifinals ===
Rank	Heat	Name	Country	Time	Notes
1	1	Jessica Gregg	Canada	43.854	QA
2	1	Arianna Fontana	Italy	43.991	QA
3	1	Zhou Yang	China	43.992	QB
4	1	Katherine Reutter	United States	44.145	QB
1	2	Wang Meng	China	42.985	QA, OR
2	2	Marianne St-Gelais	Canada	43.241	QA
3	2	Kalyna Roberge	Canada	43.633	QB
4	2	Lee Eun-byul	South Korea	43.899	QB

=== Finals ===
==== Final B (Classification Round) ====
Rank	Name	Country	Time	Notes
5	Zhou Yang	China	44.725	
6	Kalyna Roberge	Canada	44.824	
7	Katherine Reutter	United States	44.846	
8	Lee Eun-byul	South Korea	44.860	

==== Final A (Medal Round) ====
Rank	Name	Country	Time	Notes
1st place, gold medalist(s)	Wang Meng	China	43.048	
2nd place, silver medalist(s)	Marianne St-Gelais	Canada	43.707	
3rd place, bronze medalist(s)	Arianna Fontana	Italy	43.804	
4	Jessica Gregg	Canada	44.204	
