= Zhang Zhiqiang =

Zhang Zhiqiang may refer to:

- Zhang Zhiqiang (rugby union)
- Zhang Zhiqiang (speed skater)
