= Andrew Noble =

Andrew Noble may refer to:

- Sir Andrew Noble, 1st Baronet (1831–1915), Scottish physicist
- Andrew Noble (skier) (born 1984), alpine skier for Great Britain
- Sir Andrew Napier Noble, 2nd Baronet (1904–1987)
- Andrew Noble (diplomat), British diplomat
