= Claudio Rinaldi (speed skater) =

Italian speed skater

Personal information
- Born: 29 November 1987 (age 38) Bormio, Italy
- Height: 5 ft 11 in (1.80 m)
- Weight: 157 lb (71 kg)

Sport
- Country: Italy
- Sport: Short track speed skating

Achievements and titles
- World finals: 1
- Highest world ranking: 18 (1000m)

Claudio Rinaldi (born 29 November 1987) is an Italian short track speed skater.

Rinaldi competed at the 2010 Winter Olympics for Italy. He was a member of the 5000 metre relay team, which was disqualified in its semifinal.

As of 2013, Rinaldi's best performance at the World Championships is 5th, as a member of the Italian 5000 metre relay team in 2009 and 2010. His best individual finish is 20th in the 1000 metres in 2008. He has also won three gold medals as a member of the Italian relay team at the European Short Track Speed Skating Championships.

As of 2013, Rinaldi has one ISU Short Track Speed Skating World Cup podium finish, a bronze medal as part of the 5000 metre relay team in 2007–08 at Turin. His top World Cup ranking is 18th, in the 1000 metres in 2008–09.

== World Cup podiums ==
| Date | Season | Location | Rank | Event |
| 2 December 2007 | 2007–08 | Turin | 3rd place, bronze medalist(s) | 5000m Relay |
