= Short-track speed skating at the 2010 Winter Olympics – Women's 3000 metre relay =

Women's 3000 metre relay at the XXI Olympic Winter Games
- Pictogram for short track speed skating
- Venue: Pacific Coliseum
- Dates: February 13, 24, 2010
- Competitors: from 8 nations
- Teams: 8
- Winning time: 4:06.610

Medalists
| 1st place, gold medalist(s) | | Sun Linlin; Wang Meng; Zhang Hui; Zhou Yang | China |
| 2nd place, silver medalist(s) | | Jessica Gregg; Kalyna Roberge; Marianne St-Gelais; Tania Vicent | Canada |
| 3rd place, bronze medalist(s) | | Allison Baver; Alyson Dudek; Lana Gehring; Katherine Reutter; Kimberly Derrick | United States |

The finals in the women's 3000 metre relay in short track speed skating at the 2010 Winter Olympics took place on 24 February, at the Pacific Coliseum. In the final, the event was controversially won by the Chinese team, which set a new world record. The South Korean team initially finished first but was disqualified due to illegal contact which was deemed to have impeded a Chinese skater. Australian referee James Hewish subsequently received abusive and threatening emails including personal death threats from angry South Korean fans.

== Results ==
=== Semifinals ===
| Rank | Semifinal | Country | Athletes | Time | Notes |
|---|---|---|---|---|---|
| 1 | 1 | South Korea | Cho Ha-ri; Kim Min-jung; Lee Eun-byul; Park Seung-hi | 4:10.753 | QA |
| 2 | 1 | United States | Kimberly Derrick; Alyson Dudek; Lana Gehring; Katherine Reutter | 4:15.376 | QA |
| 3 | 1 | Netherlands | Liesbeth Mau Asam; Jorien ter Mors; Annita van Doorn; Maaike Vos | 4:16.520 | QB |
| 4 | 1 | Italy | Arianna Fontana; Cecilia Maffei; Martina Valcepina; Katia Zini | 4:23.950 | QB |
| 1 | 2 | China | Sun Linlin; Wang Meng; Zhang Hui; Zhou Yang | 4:08.797 | QA, OR |
| 2 | 2 | Canada | Jessica Gregg; Kalyna Roberge; Marianne St-Gelais; Tania Vicent | 4:11.476 | QA |
| 3 | 2 | Japan | Ayuko Ito; Mika Ozawa; Yui Sakai; Biba Sakurai | 4:13.752 | QB |
| 4 | 2 | Hungary | Rózsa Darázs; Bernadett Heidum; Erika Huszár; Andrea Keszler | 4:17.487 | QB |

=== Finals ===
==== Final B (Classification Round) ====
| Rank | Country | Athletes | Time | Notes |
|---|---|---|---|---|
| 4 | Netherlands | Sanne van Kerkhof; Jorien ter Mors; Annita van Doorn; Maaike Vos | 4:16.120 | |
| 5 | Hungary | Rózsa Darázs; Bernadett Heidum; Erika Huszár; Andrea Keszler | 4:17.937 | |
| 6 | Italy | Lucia Peretti; Cecilia Maffei; Martina Valcepina; Katia Zini | 4:18.559 | |
| 7 | Japan | Ayuko Ito; Hiroko Sadakane; Yui Sakai; Biba Sakurai | 4:28.745 | |

==== Final A (Medal Round) ====
| Rank | Country | Athletes | Time | Notes |
|---|---|---|---|---|
| 1st place, gold medalist(s) | China | Sun Linlin; Wang Meng; Zhang Hui; Zhou Yang | 4:06.610 | WR |
| 2nd place, silver medalist(s) | Canada | Jessica Gregg; Kalyna Roberge; Marianne St-Gelais; Tania Vicent | 4:09.137 | |
| 3rd place, bronze medalist(s) | United States | Allison Baver; Alyson Dudek; Lana Gehring; Katherine Reutter | 4:14.081 | |
| – | South Korea | Cho Ha-ri; Kim Min-jung; Lee Eun-byul; Park Seung-hi | | DSQ |
