= Steve Robillard =

Short track speed skater

Personal information
- Born: June 23, 1984 (age 42) Montreal, Quebec, Canada

Sport
- Country: Canada
- Sport: Short track speed skating
Medal record
Men's short track speed skating
Representing Canada
World Championships
Gold medal – first place	2005 Beijing	5000m relay
Silver medal – second place	2008 Gangneung	5000m relay
World Team Championships
Gold medal – first place	2005 Chuncheon	Team
Silver medal – second place	2008 Harbin	Team
Junior World Championships
Silver medal – second place	2002 Chuncheon	2000m relay
Silver medal – second place	2002 Chuncheon	1000 m
Silver medal – second place	2002 Chuncheon	1500 m
Bronze medal – third place	2003 Budapest	2000m relay

Steve Robillard (born June 23, 1984) is a Canadian retired short track speed skater and World Champion in men's relay.

== Career ==
Robillard started speed skating at the age of 3. He was top ranked junior in Canada in 2002 after he won three medals at the 2002 World Junior Short Track Speed Skating Championships.

Robillard debuted in senior competitions during the 1999-2000 season when he first entered World Cup events. During his career, Robillard set world records, including the record of 2.15:383 at 1500 m he set on 12 October 2001 in Calgary.

His senior career went up in 2004. During the 2003-04 World Cup season, he achieved his first personal podiums at the last World Cup stage in Bormio where he was second at both 1000 m and 3000 m as well as third in general classification of the stage. He also won the team relay in Bormio and was second with team Canada in Mladá Boleslav.

The next season brought him more success. During the 2004-05 World Cup season, Robillard was third at 1500 m in Saguenay and then reached top-3 in all races in Spišská Nová Ves: second at both 500 m and 1500 m as well as third both at 1000 m and in general classification. He also helped team Canada to win medals in relays at all six World Cup stages, being victorious in two World Cup relays and winning two silver and two bronze medals. That season he became 2004 World Champion in men's relay as well as World Team Champion.

Robillard missed the 2005-06 season and therefore was not able to qualify for the 2006 Winter Olympics. During the 2006-07 season, Robillard clinched one gold and one silver in men's relays.

Robillard managed to recover in the 2007-08 season when he won a silver in men's relay at the 2008 World Championships and another silver at the World Team Championships as well as two relay medals at the World Cup. That season became the last in his sporting career and he retired from competitive sports.

After his sporting career, Robillard became a coach. He coached Maxime St-Jules.
