= Andrew Noble (skier) =

British alpine skier (born 1984)

Andrew Noble (born 10 March 1984) is an alpine skier from Great Britain. He competed for Great Britain at the 2010 Winter Olympics. His best finish was a 29th place in the slalom.
