= Marina Georgieva-Nikolova =

Bulgarian speed skater

Personal information
- Born: June 10, 1980 (age 46) Sofia, Bulgaria
- Height: 5 ft 3 in (160 cm)
- Weight: 119 lb (54 kg)

Sport
- Country: Bulgaria
- Sport: Short track speed skating

Achievements and titles
- World finals: 4
- Highest world ranking: 12 (overall)
Medal record
Women's short track speed skating
Representing Bulgaria
World Championships
Bronze medal – third place	1999 Sofia	3000 m relay
Bronze medal – third place	2001 Jeonju	3000 m relay
Bronze medal – third place	2003 Warsaw	3000 m relay

Marina Georgieva-Nikolova (Bulgarian: Марина Георгиева-Николова; born June 10, 1980, in Sofia) is a Bulgarian short-track speed-skater.

Georgieva-Nikolova competed at the 2002 and 2010 Winter Olympics for Bulgaria. In 2002, she finished fourth in her opening round race of the 1500 metres, failing to advance. In the 500 metres she finished second and advanced to the quarterfinals, where she finished fourth, failing to advance further. She was also a member of the Bulgarian 3000 metre relay team, which finished third in the semifinals and second in the B Final, ending up sixth overall. In 2010, she was disqualified in the first round of the 500 metres, failing to advance. In the 1500 metres, she finished third in the opening heat, advancing to the quarterfinals, where she finished seventh and did not advance. Her best individual finish, is 15th, in the 2002 500 metres.

As of 2013, Georgieva-Nikolova has won three bronze medals at the World Championships, as part of the Bulgarian 3000 metre relay team. Her best individual performance at a World Championships was in 2008, when she came 11th in the 500 metres. She also won two gold medals as a member of the Bulgarian relay team at the European Championships.

As of 2013, Georgieva-Nikolova has two ISU Short Track Speed Skating World Cup podium finishes. She won bronze in the 1500 metres in 2006–07 at Heerenveen, and as a member of the Bulgarian relay team at Quebec City in 2007–08. Her top World Cup ranking is 12th, in the overall in 2002–03.

== World Cup podiums ==
Date	Season	Location	Rank	Event
4 February 2007	2006–07	Heerenveen	3rd place, bronze medalist(s)	1500m
3 February 2008	2007–08	Madison	3rd place, bronze medalist(s)	3000m Relay
