= Tom Iveson =

British speed skater

Personal information
- Full name: Thomas Iveson
- Born: 9 March 1983 (age 43) Solihull, UK
- Height: 5 ft 9 in (175 cm)
- Weight: 161 lb (73 kg)

Sport
- Country: Great Britain
- Sport: Short track speed skating

Achievements and titles
- World finals: 1
- Highest world ranking: 10 (500m)
Medal record
Men's short track speed skating
Representing Great Britain
World Championships
Bronze medal – third place	2008 Gangneung	5000 m relay

Thomas "Tom" Iveson (born 9 March 1983 in Solihull) is a British short-track speed skater.

Iveson competed at the 2010 Winter Olympics for Great Britain. In the 1000 metres, he placed fourth in his round one heat, failing to advance. He was also a member of the British relay team. He raced in the semifinal, placing 4th, advancing the British to the B Final, which the team won to finish 6th overall.

As of 2013, Iveson's best performance at the World Championships came in 2008, when he won a bronze medal as part of the British relay team. His best individual finish came in 2003, a 12th-place finish in the 500 meters. He also won silver medals as a member of the British relay team at the 2003 and 2008 European Championships.

As of 2013, Iveson has two ISU Short Track Speed Skating World Cup podium finishes, both as part of the British relay team. He won bronze medals in 2007–08 at Salt Lake City and in 2008–09 at Vancouver. His top World Cup ranking is 10th, in the 500 metres in 2002–03.

== World Cup podiums ==
Date	Season	Location	Rank	Event
10 February 2008	2007–08	Salt Lake City	3rd place, bronze medalist(s)	5000m Relay
27 October 2008	2008–09	Vancouver	3rd place, bronze medalist(s)	5000m Relay
