= Cecilia Maffei =

Italian speed skater

Personal information
- Born: 19 November 1984 (age 41) Pinzolo, Italy
- Height: 5 ft 5 in (165 cm)
- Weight: 132 lb (60 kg)

Sport
- Country: Italy
- Sport: Short track speed skating
- Club: Fiamme Azzurre

Achievements and titles
- World finals: 2
- Highest world ranking: 7 (1500m)
Medal record
Women's short track speed skating
Representing Italy
Olympic Games
Silver medal – second place	2018 Pyeongchang	3000 m relay
World Championships
Bronze medal – third place	2006 Minneapolis	3000 m relay
Bronze medal – third place	2014 Montreal	3000 m relay
World Team Championships
Bronze medal – third place	2010 Bormio	Team

Cecilia Maffei (born 19 November 1984) is an Italian short track speed skater.

== Career ==
Maffei competed at the 2010 Winter Olympics for Italy. She placed third in her round one races of the 500 and 1000 metres, and fifth in the first round of the 1500 metres, failing to advance in all three. She was also a member of the Italian 3000 metre relay team, which finished fourth in the semifinals and third in the B Final, ending up sixth overall. Her best overall individual finish, is 21st, in the 1000 metres.

As of 2013, Maffei's best performance at the World Championships came in 2006, when she won a bronze medal as a member of the German relay team. Her best individual performance at a World Championships was in 2010, when she came 15th in the 1000 metres. She also won a bronze medal at the 2010 World Short Track Speed Skating Team Championships for Italy, and eight medals as a member of the Italian relay team at the European Championships.

As of 2013, Maffei has two ISU Short Track Speed Skating World Cup victories, both as part of the Italian relay team. Her first came in 2006–07 at Heerenveen. She also has thirteen other podium finishes as a member of the relay team. Her top World Cup ranking is 7th, in the 1500 metres in 2006–07.

== World Cup podiums ==
Date	Season	Location	Rank	Event
8 December 2002	2002–03	Bormio	3rd place, bronze medalist(s)	3000m Relay
4 February 2007	2006–07	Heerenveen	1st place, gold medalist(s)	3000m Relay
11 February 2007	2006–07	Budapest	3rd place, bronze medalist(s)	3000m Relay
28 October 2007	2007–08	Kobe	2nd place, silver medalist(s)	3000m Relay
25 November 2007	2007–08	Heerenveen	2nd place, silver medalist(s)	3000m Relay
2 December 2007	2007–08	Turin	2nd place, silver medalist(s)	3000m Relay
30 November 2008	2008–09	Beijing	3rd place, bronze medalist(s)	3000m Relay
8 February 2009	2008–09	Sofia	2nd place, silver medalist(s)	3000m Relay
15 February 2009	2008–09	Dresden	2nd place, silver medalist(s)	3000m Relay
12 December 2010	2010–11	Shanghai	3rd place, bronze medalist(s)	3000m Relay
13 February 2011	2010–11	Moscow	3rd place, bronze medalist(s)	3000m Relay
4 December 2011	2011–12	Nagoya	1st place, gold medalist(s)	3000m Relay
9 December 2012	2012–13	Shanghai	3rd place, bronze medalist(s)	3000m Relay
3 February 2013	2012–13	Sochi	3rd place, bronze medalist(s)	3000m Relay
17 November 2013	2013–14	Kolomna	3rd place, bronze medalist(s)	3000m Relay
