= Marc-André Monette =

Canadian short track speed skater

Personal information
- Born: 25 February 1981 (age 45) Canada

Sport
- Country: Canada
- Sport: Short track speed skating
Medal record
Men's short track speed skating
Representing Canada
World Championships
Silver medal – second place	2008 Gangneung	5,000 m relay
World Team Championships
Gold medal – first place	2007 Budapest	Team
Silver medal – second place	2008 Harbin	Team
Silver medal – second place	2009 Heerenveen	Team
Winter Universiade
Silver medal – second place	2003 Tarvisio	1500 m
Silver medal – second place	2003 Tarvisio	3000 m

Marc-André Monette (born 25 February 1981) is a former Canadian short track speed skater.

He was a silver medalist in relay competition at the 2008 World Championships. During the years 2007–2009, he was a member of the Canadian national team. At the World Cup, he finished twice second in 1000 m competitions, and had two victories as well as another four podiums in relay competitions.
