= Alyson Dudek =

American short track speed skater

Personal information
- Born: July 30, 1990 (age 36) Hales Corners, Wisconsin, U.S.
- Height: 5 ft 6 in (168 cm)
- Weight: 130 lb (59 kg)

Sport
- Country: United States
- Sport: Short track speed skating
- Club: APTE
Medal record
Women's short track speed skating
Representing the United States
Olympic Games
Bronze medal – third place	2010 Vancouver	3000 m relay
World Championships
Bronze medal – third place	2010 Sofia	3000 m relay
World Team Championships
Bronze medal – third place	2009 Heerenveen	Team
Bronze medal – third place	2011 Warsaw	Team

Alyson Dudek (born July 30, 1990) is an American short track speed skater and Olympic bronze medallist.

== Biography ==
Dudek, from Hales Corners, Wisconsin, is a fourth-generation Polish American. Dudek attended Divine Savior Holy Angels High School for three and a half years. Dudek qualified for her first World Cup team while still a high school student and finished her high school education through online correspondence course while training in Salt Lake City. As a younger skater, Dudek originally trained in both long track and short track speed skating before choosing to specialize in short track. In late 2014, Dudek competed in the 26th season of the reality show The Amazing Race, which began airing on February 25, 2015, while despite performing well throughout the race, their season has come to an end in Leg 8, where a poor performance in the leg and a U-Turn from Laura & Tyler sent them home in 6th place. Dudek was teamed with her boyfriend, bobsledder Steven Langton, whom Dudek met at the 2014 Winter Olympics in Sochi.

== Career ==
At the 2010 Winter Olympics, Dudek competed in the 500 m and 3000 m relay. In the 500 m, Dudek didn't make it past the quarterfinals. In the 3000 m relay, Dudek was part of the relay team that won bronze due to the disqualification of South Korea behind China and Canada. At the U.S. Olympic trials on January 5, 2014, Dudek qualified for the 2014 Olympic team, her second trip to the Games.
