= Amanda Overland =

Short track speed skater

Personal information
- Born: August 30, 1981 (age 45) Kitchener, Ontario, Canada
- Height: 165 cm (5 ft 5 in)

Sport
- Club: Cambridge Speed Skating Club
Medal record
Women's short track speed skating
Representing Canada
Olympic Games
Silver medal – second place	2006 Turin	3000 m relay
World Championships
Gold medal – first place	2005 Beijing	3000 m relay
Silver medal – second place	2006 Minneapolis	3000 m relay
Silver medal – second place	2008 Gangneung	3000 m relay
Bronze medal – third place	2007 Milan	3000 m relay
World Team Championships
Bronze medal – third place	2005 Chuncheon	Team
Bronze medal – third place	2006 Montreal	Team
Bronze medal – third place	2007 Budapest	Team
Bronze medal – third place	2008 Harbin	Team

Amanda Overland (born August 30, 1981) is a Canadian short track speed skater who competed in the 2006 Winter Olympics. She is the sister of Kevin Overland and Cindy Overland, both Olympic Speed Skaters.

Personal records
Women's short track speed skating
Event	Result	Date	Location	Notes
500 m	44.794	2003-10-18	Calgary	
1000 m	1:30.823	2005-11-13	Bormio	
1500 m	2:21.886	2005-02-04	Budapest	
