= Zhang Zhiqiang (speed skater) =

Chinese short track speed skater (born 1988)

Personal information
- Born: 4 September 1988 (age 37)
Medal record
Men's short track speed skating
Representing China
Winter Universiade
Gold medal – first place	2009 Harbin	5000m relay
World Junior Championships
Bronze medal – third place	2008 Bolzano	2000m relay

Zhang Zhiqiang (born 4 September 1988) is a Chinese short track speed skater.

His career is marked with a victory in a 1000 m race during the 2007-08 World Cup as well as three team podiums.
