= Sarah Sauvey =

British freestyle skier

Personal information
- Born: 10 November 1983 (age 42) Melbourne, Australia

Sport
- Sport: Skiing
- Updated on 31 July 2013

Sarah Sauvey (born 10 November 1983) is an Australian-born British freestyle skier, specializing in ski cross.

Sauvey made her World Cup debut in January 2006, at les Contamines, France, for Australia. In 2007, she changed her nationality from Australia to Great Britain (her parents are both English born), competing first for Great Britain in the 2007/08 season. As of April 2013, her career best is 12th in the 2007 World Championships in Madonna di Campiglio, Italy, racing for Australia. She finished 13th at Valmalenco in 2007/08. Her best World Cup overall finish in ski cross is 21st, in 2005/06.

Sauvey competed at the 2010 Winter Olympics for Great Britain. She placed 34th in the qualifying round in ski cross, and did not advance to the knockout rounds.

As of April 2013, her best finish at the World Championships is 12th, in 2007.
