= J. P. Kepka =

Short track speed skater

Personal information
- Born: March 6, 1984 (age 42) St. Louis, Missouri, U.S.
- Spouse: Caroline Hallisey
Medal record
Men's short track speed skating
Representing the United States
Olympic Games
Bronze medal – third place	2006 Turin	5000 m relay
World Championships
Bronze medal – third place	2006 Minneapolis	5000 m relay
World Team Championships
Gold medal – first place	2008 Harbin	Team

John Paul "J. P." Kepka (born March 6, 1984) is a short track speed skater from the United States who won bronze in the 5000m relay at the 2006 Winter Olympics in Turin. Kepka also represented the U.S. in the 2002 Salt Lake City Winter Olympics.

He was born in St. Louis, Missouri, and skated for the Metros Speed Skating Club. He is the first male St. Louisian to win a medal in speed skating.
