= Sun Linlin =

Chinese short track speed skater

Medal record

Women's short track speed skating

Representing China

Olympic Games
Gold medal – first place	2010 Vancouver	3000 m relay

Sun Linlin (Chinese: 孙琳琳; born October 3, 1988, in Dandong) is a Chinese female short track speed skater. She competed at the 2010 Winter Olympics, winning a gold medal in the women's 3000 metre relay event.
