= Shin Sae-bom =

South Korean speed skater

Medal record

Women's short track speed skating

Representing South Korea

World Championships
Gold medal – first place	2008 Gangreung	3000 m relay
Silver medal – second place	2009 Vienna	3000 m relay
Bronze medal – third place	2009 Vienna	1000 m
Bronze medal – third place	2009 Vienna	1500 m
Bronze medal – third place	2009 Vienna	3000 m

World Team Championships
Silver medal – second place	2008 Harbin	Team
Silver medal – second place	2009 Heerenveen	Team

Winter Universiade
Gold medal – first place	2011 Erzurum	3000 m relay

World Junior Championships
Silver medal – second place	2007 Mladá Boleslav	Overall

Shin Sae-Bom (Korean: 신새봄; born February 28, 1992) is a South Korean short track speed skater.
