= Paul Worth =

British speed skater (born 1986)

Personal information
- Born: 13 January 1986 (age 40) Nottingham, England, United Kingdom
- Height: 5 ft 11 in (180 cm)
- Weight: 187 lb (85 kg)

Sport
- Country: Great Britain
- Sport: Short track speed skating

Achievements and titles
- World finals: 1
- Highest world ranking: 11 (500m)
Medal record
Men's short track speed skating
Representing Great Britain
World Championships
Bronze medal – third place	2008 Gangneung	5000 m relay

Paul Worth (born 13 January 1986 in Nottingham) is a British short track speed skater.

Worth competed at the 2010 Winter Olympics for Great Britain. In the 500 metres, he placed third in his round one heat, failing to advance. He was also a member of the British relay team. He did not race in the semifinal, but did race in the B final, which the British won to finish 6th overall.

As of 2013, Worth's best performance at the World Championships came in 2008, when he won a bronze medal as part of the British relay team. His best individual finish also came in 2008, a 19th-place finish in the 1000 meters. He also won a silver medal as a member of the British relay team at the 2008 European Championships.

As of 2013, Worth has two ISU Short Track Speed Skating World Cup podium finishes, both as part of the British relay team. He has won bronze medals in 2007–08 at Salt Lake City and in 2008-09 at Vancouver. His top World Cup ranking is 11th, in the 500 metres in 2007–08.

== World Cup podiums ==
Date	Season	Location	Rank	Event
10 February 2008	2007–08	Salt Lake City	3rd place, bronze medalist(s)	5000m Relay
27 October 2008	2008–09	Vancouver	3rd place, bronze medalist(s)	5000m Relay
