= Charles Leveille =

American speed skater

Personal information
- Full name: Charles Ryan Leveille
- Born: March 7, 1983 (age 43) Chattanooga, Tennessee
- Website: linkedin.com/in/crleveille

Sport
- Country: United States of America
- Sport: Speed skating
- Retired: 2010
Medal record
Men's short track speed skating
Representing the United States
World Championships
Gold medal – first place	2008 Harbin	Team
Silver medal – second place	2008 Gangneung	3000 m S.F
Bronze medal – third place	2008 Gangneung	1500 m

Charles Ryan Leveille (born March 7, 1983, in Chattanooga, Tennessee) is a retired[4] American short track and long track speed skating competitor and is an Olympian and World Champion medalist (one gold, one silver and one bronze).

== Athletic career ==
First-time Olympian Charles Ryan Leveille is a versatile skater, having participated on the inline and short-track circuits before dedicating himself to the long track. After just two months of training for short track, Leveille—who competed as Ryan Cox in inline and short track—earned a bronze medal in the 500m and 3000m at the 2004 U.S. Championships. The Chattanooga native's progress was delayed just months after Nationals when he broke his back in a freak short track accident and spent four months in a full-body cast. Leveille switched to long track in August 2005.

After competing in long track for just a few months, Leveille finished 10th overall at the 2005 U.S. Championships and qualified for the 2006 Fall World Cup Team. He earned a silver in the 10,000m and ranked third in the men's allround standings at the 2006 U.S. Championships.

He competed in the 2006 Winter Olympics, in both the team pursuit and the 10,000 meter events. He currently resides in Atlanta, Georgia.

As part of the US World Championship team in Gangneung, South Korea, he competed 3/7-3/9/08. Leveille won a bronze medal in the 1500m race, as well as a silver medal in the 3000m superfinal.

== Education ==
Ryan graduated from the University of Georgia with BBAs in Management Information Systems and International Business with a French language emphasis. He was a Leonard Leadership Scholar and Deer Run Fellow, which are the top leadership programs at the university and one of the premier programs in the US.

== Professional career ==
During the final 8 months of Ryan's time at university, he was a consultant for US Speedskating as their Event Coordinator.

== Sponsorships ==
Using his recognition and fame from his sport, he accumulated a list of sponsors that included The Home Depot, Mayfield Dairy, BlueLinx, and Bont
