= Anthony Douglas =

British speed skater

Anthony Douglas (born 1985, in Nottingham) is a British former short track speed skater who competed at the 2010 Winter Olympics. Douglas was a member of the British team that finished sixth in the 5000 meter relay.

== Achievements ==
- 2008 ISU World Cup – Vancouver, British Columbia, Canada
  - (bronze) – Men's 5000m relay
- 2008 ISU European Championships – Ventspils, Latvia
  - (silver) – Men's 5000m relay
- 2010 ISU European Championships – Dresden, Germany
  - (bronze) – Men's 5000m relay
- 2011 ISU European Championships – Heerenveen, Netherlands
  - (bronze) – Men's 5000m relay
- Former British national record holder – 1500m and 5000m relay
