= 2008 World Short Track Speed Skating Championships =

Sports event in Gangneung, South Korea

The 2008 World Short Track Speed Skating Championships took place between 7 and 9 March 2008 in Gangneung, South Korea. The World Championships are organised by the ISU which also run world cups and championships in speed skating and figure skating.

== Results ==
=== Men ===
Event	Gold		Silver		Bronze	
Overall*	Apolo Anton Ohno; United States	68 points	Lee Ho-suk; South Korea	63 points	Song Kyung-taek; South Korea	62 points
500 m	Apolo Anton Ohno; United States	42.568	Charles Hamelin; Canada	42.625	Song Kyung-taek; South Korea	42.632
1000 m	Lee Ho-suk; South Korea	1:26.462	Apolo Anton Ohno; United States	1:26.528	Song Kyung-taek; South Korea	1:26.615
1500 m	Song Kyung-taek; South Korea	2:18.916	Lee Ho-suk; South Korea	2:18.971	Charles Leveille; United States	2:19.066
5000 m relay	South Korea; Lee Ho-suk; Lee Seung-hoon; Song Kyung-taek; Sung Si-bak; Kwak Yoon-gy	6:51.148	Canada; François Hamelin; Jean-François Monette; Marc-André Monette; Steve Robillard; Charles Hamelin	6:52.318	Great Britain; Jon Eley; Tom Iveson; Paul Stanley; Paul Worth	6:56.765

* First place is awarded 34 points, second is awarded 21 points, third is awarded 13 points, fourth is awarded 8 points, fifth is awarded 5 points, sixth is awarded 3 points, seventh is awarded 2 points and eighth is awarded 1 point in the finals of each individual race to determine the overall world champion. The relays do not count for the overall classification.

=== Women ===
Event	Gold		Silver		Bronze	
Overall*	Wang Meng; China	107 points	Zhou Yang; China	76 points	Yang Shin-young; South Korea	37 points
500 m	Wang Meng; China	43.888	Liu Qiuhong; China	43.973	Kalyna Roberge; Canada	44.018
1000 m	Wang Meng; China	1:32.527	Zhou Yang; China	1:32.595	Kalyna Roberge; Canada	1:32.636
1500 m	Wang Meng; China	2:22.819	Yang Shin-young; South Korea	2:22.904	Zhou Yang; China	2:23.191
3000 m relay	South Korea; Jung Eun-ju; Kim Min-jung; Park Seung-hi; Yang Shin-young; Shin Sae-bom	4:16.261	Canada; Jessica Gregg; Anne Maltais; Amanda Overland; Tania Vicent; Kalyna Roberge	4:20.254	China; Fu Tianyu; Liu Qiuhong; Wang Meng; Zhou Yang; Meng Xiaoxue	4:23.022

* First place is awarded 34 points, second is awarded 21 points, third is awarded 13 points, fourth is awarded 8 points, fifth is awarded 5 points, sixth is awarded 3 points, seventh is awarded 2 points, and eighth is awarded 1 point in the finals of each individual race to determine the overall world champion. The relays do not count for the overall classification.

== Medal table ==
* Host nation (South Korea)

Rank	Nation	Gold	Silver	Bronze	Total
1	South Korea*	4	3	4	11
2	China	4	3	2	9
3	United States	2	1	1	4
4	Canada	0	3	2	5
5	Great Britain	0	0	1	1
Totals (5 entries)		10	10	10	30
