= Zhao Nannan =

Chinese speed skater

Zhao Nannan (simplified Chinese: 赵楠楠; traditional Chinese: 趙楠楠; pinyin: Zhào Nánnán; born March 18, 1990, in Changchun, Jilin) is a Chinese female short track speed skater. She competed for China at the 2010 Winter Olympics in the 500 metres.

== Achievements ==
- 2009-2010 season, ISU Short Track Speed Skating World Cup Finals 500 m bronze medal
