= Yang Shin-young =

South Korean speed skater

Medal record

Women's short track speed skating

Representing South Korea

World Championships
| Gold medal – first place | 2008 Gangneung | 3000 m relay |
| Silver medal – second place | 2009 Vienna | 3000 m relay |
| Silver medal – second place | 2008 Gangneung | 1500 m |
| Bronze medal – third place | 2008 Gangneung | Overall |

World Team Championships
| Silver medal – second place | 2009 Heerenveen | Team |
| Silver medal – second place | 2008 Harbin | Team |

Winter Universiade
| Silver medal – second place | 2009 Harbin | 3000 m relay |

Asian Winter Games
| Silver medal – second place | 2011 Astana/Almaty | 5000 m relay |

World Junior Championships
| Gold medal – first place | 2007 Mladá Boleslav | Overall |

- Yang Shin-young
- Hangul: 양신영
- Hanja: 梁信英
- RR: Yang Sinyeong
- MR: Yang Sinyŏng

Yang Shin-young (born 8 November 1990) is a female South Korean short-track and long-track speed skater.
