= Wang Meng (speed skater) =

Chinese short-track speed skater (born 1985)

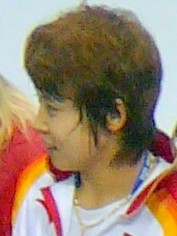

Personal information
- Born: April 10, 1985 (age 41) Qitaihe, Heilongjiang, China
- Height: 167 cm (5 ft 6 in)
- Weight: 58 kg (128 lb)

Sport
- Country: China
- Sport: Short track speed skating

Achievements and titles
- Personal bests: 500 m: 42.597 (2013); 1000 m: 1:29.213 (2010); 1500 m: 2:20.876 (2005); 3000 m: 5:11.515(2004)
Medal record
Women's short track speed skating
Representing China
Event	1st	2nd	3rd
Olympic Games	4	1	1
World Championships	18	10	3
World Team Championships	3	4	0
Asian Games	2	2	1
Olympic Games
Gold medal – first place	2006 Turin	500 m
Gold medal – first place	2010 Vancouver	500 m
Gold medal – first place	2010 Vancouver	1000 m
Gold medal – first place	2010 Vancouver	3000 m relay
Silver medal – second place	2006 Turin	1000 m
Bronze medal – third place	2006 Turin	1500 m
World Championships
Gold medal – first place	2003 Warsaw	3000 m relay
Gold medal – first place	2004 Gothenburg	500 m
Gold medal – first place	2006 Minneapolis	500 m
Gold medal – first place	2006 Minneapolis	3000 m relay
Gold medal – first place	2008 Gangneung	Overall
Gold medal – first place	2008 Gangneung	500 m
Gold medal – first place	2008 Gangneung	1000 m
Gold medal – first place	2008 Gangneung	1500 m
Gold medal – first place	2009 Vienna	Overall
Gold medal – first place	2009 Vienna	500 m
Gold medal – first place	2009 Vienna	1000 m
Gold medal – first place	2009 Vienna	3000 m relay
Gold medal – first place	2010 Sofia	500 m
Gold medal – first place	2010 Sofia	1000 m
Gold medal – first place	2013 Debrecen	Overall
Gold medal – first place	2013 Debrecen	500 m
Gold medal – first place	2013 Debrecen	1000 m
Gold medal – first place	2013 Debrecen	3000 m relay
Silver medal – second place	2004 Gothenburg	Overall
Silver medal – second place	2004 Gothenburg	1500 m
Silver medal – second place	2004 Gothenburg	3000 m relay
Silver medal – second place	2005 Beijing	500 m
Silver medal – second place	2005 Beijing	3000 m relay
Silver medal – second place	2006 Minneapolis	Overall
Silver medal – second place	2006 Minneapolis	1000 m
Silver medal – second place	2006 Minneapolis	1500 m
Silver medal – second place	2006 Minneapolis	3000 m
Silver medal – second place	2010 Sofia	Overall
Bronze medal – third place	2005 Beijing	1000 m
Bronze medal – third place	2005 Beijing	1500 m
Bronze medal – third place	2008 Gangneung	3000 m relay
World Team Championships
Gold medal – first place	2008 Harbin	Team
Gold medal – first place	2009 Heerenveen	Team
Silver medal – second place	2003 Sofia	Team
Silver medal – second place	2004 St. Petersburg	Team
Silver medal – second place	2005 Chuncheon	Team
Silver medal – second place	2006 Montréal	Team
World Junior Championships
Gold medal – first place	2002 Chuncheon	500 m
Silver medal – second place	2002 Chuncheon	Overall
Silver medal – second place	2002 Chuncheon	1500 m
Silver medal – second place	2002 Chuncheon	2000 m relay
Asian Winter Games
Gold medal – first place	2007 Changchun	500 m
Gold medal – first place	2007 Changchun	3000 m relay
Silver medal – second place	2003 Aomori	500 m
Silver medal – second place	2007 Changchun	1000 m
Bronze medal – third place	2007 Changchun	1500 m

Wang Meng (Chinese: 王濛; pinyin: Wáng Méng; born April 10, 1985) is a Chinese short track speed skater. She is a four-time Olympic Champion and 2008 and 2009 Overall World Champion. She is the most decorated Chinese Winter Olympic athlete ever with four Olympic gold medals, a silver and a bronze. Wang won gold in the 500 m event, silver in the 1000 m and bronze in the 1500 m event at the 2006 Winter Olympics. She won 500 m and 1000 m gold medals at the 2010 Vancouver Olympics and added a third gold medal in the 3000 m relay with the China team. Wang has also won 18 gold medals at the World Championships. She is one of the most decorated short track speed skaters of all time.

== Early life ==
Wang Meng started short track speed skating in 1994, when she was nine. In 1998 she entered Heilongjiang Provincial Sports School, which is affiliated with Harbin Institute of Physical Education. She graduated from Harbin Institute of Physical Education.

== 2010 Winter Olympics ==
Wang was considered a strong contender for all short track speed skating events at the 2010 Winter Olympics. She won the gold medal in the 500 m event in which she had previously been dominant and was considered to be the favorite to win. She set three Olympic records in the 500 m heats, while in the finals she led from start to finish accumulating a huge lead ahead of all other competitors. In the 1,500 m race, she failed to finish after having lost her footing and crashing into the barricades. However, she came back to win the 3,000 m relay with the Chinese team and the 1,000 m solo race. She ended up snatching three gold medals, which makes her the most successful Winter Olympian ever for China.

== Conflict with the team manager ==
On 24 July 2011, Wang Meng had a physical conflict with the team manager Wang Chunlu at the hotel in the Qingdao training camp. In the scuffle her arm was injured and she had to be taken to a hospital. There was a lot of speculation in the media as to what had really happened, but both sides involved provided very different stories, which makes the truth unclear to this day.

Ten days after the incident, on 4 August 2011, Wang Meng was expelled from the national short track speed skating team and the same applied to her teammate Liu Xianwei, who actively supported Wang during those ten days. The team manager, Wang Chunlu, was moved to another position, and Liu Hao became the new team manager.

== 2014 Winter Olympics ==
On 16 January 2014, Wang collided with a teammate while training in Shanghai for the 2014 Winter Olympics. She broke her ankle, which required surgery and a recovery period of at least six months. She missed the Olympics as a result.

== International Competition Podiums ==
Date	Competition	Location	Rank	Event	Result
4 Jan 2002	2002 World Junior Championships, Chuncheon	(South Korea) Chuncheon, Korea	Silver medal	1500 m	2:30.709
5 Jan 2002	2002 World Junior Championships, Chuncheon	(South Korea) Chuncheon, Korea	Gold medal	500 m	46.072
6 Jan 2002	2002 World Junior Championships, Chuncheon	(South Korea) Chuncheon, Korea	Silver medal	Overall	55 points
6 Jan 2002	2002 World Junior Championships, Chuncheon	(South Korea) Chuncheon, Korea	Silver medal	2000 m relay	2:54.832
19 Oct 2002	2002–03 ISU World Cup, Chuncheon	(South Korea) Chuncheon, Korea	3rd place, bronze medalist(s)	500 m	45.689
20 Oct 2002	2002–03 ISU World Cup, Chuncheon	(South Korea) Chuncheon, Korea	2nd place, silver medalist(s)	3000 m relay	4:20.382
25 Oct 2002	2002–03 ISU World Cup, Beijing	Beijing, China	3rd place, bronze medalist(s)	1500 m	2:41.008
26 Oct 2002	2002–03 ISU World Cup, Beijing	Beijing, China	3rd place, bronze medalist(s)	500 m	44.838
27 Oct 2002	2002–03 ISU World Cup, Beijing	Beijing, China	3rd place, bronze medalist(s)	1000 m	1:36.181
27 Oct 2002	2002–03 ISU World Cup, Beijing	Beijing, China	1st place, gold medalist(s)	3000 m relay	4:16.214
1 Dec 2002	2002–03 ISU World Cup, St. Petersburg	St. Petersburg, Russia	1st place, gold medalist(s)	3000 m relay	4:19.627
1 Feb 2003	2003 Asian Winter Games, Aomori	(Japan) Misawa Ice Arena	Silver medal	500 m	46.242
15 Feb 2003	2002–03 ISU World Cup, Saguenay	Saguenay, Canada	1st place, gold medalist(s)	500 m	45.532
16 Feb 2003	2002–03 ISU World Cup, Saguenay	Saguenay, Canada	2nd place, silver medalist(s)	1000 m	1:35.236
16 Feb 2003	2002–03 ISU World Cup, Saguenay	Saguenay, Canada	3rd place, bronze medalist(s)	3000 m	6:01.232
16 Feb 2003	2002–03 ISU World Cup, Saguenay	Saguenay, Canada	2nd place, silver medalist(s)	3000 m relay	4:22.375
16 Mar 2003	2003 World Team Championships, Sofia	Sofia, Bulgaria	Silver medal	Team	31 points
23 Mar 2003	2003 World Championships, Poland	Warsaw, Poland	Gold medal	3000 m relay	4:22.030
17 Oct 2003	2003–04 ISU World Cup, Calgary	Calgary, Canada	2nd place, silver medalist(s)	1500 m	2:27.429
18 Oct 2003	2003–04 ISU World Cup, Calgary	Calgary, Canada	1st place, gold medalist(s)	500 m	43.983
19 Oct 2003	2003–04 ISU World Cup, Calgary	Calgary, Canada	2nd place, silver medalist(s)	Overall	71 points
19 Oct 2003	2003–04 ISU World Cup, Calgary	Calgary, Canada	2nd place, silver medalist(s)	3000 m relay	4:11.804
25 Oct 2003	2003–04 ISU World Cup, Marquette	Marquette, United States	3rd place, bronze medalist(s)	1000 m	1:35.371
25 Oct 2003	2003–04 ISU World Cup, Marquette	Marquette, United States	2nd place, silver medalist(s)	3000 m relay	4:16.686
28 Nov 2003	2003–04 ISU World Cup, Jeonju	(South Korea) Hwasan Ice Arena	3rd place, bronze medalist(s)	1500 m	2:41.645
6 Dec 2003	2003–04 ISU World Cup, Beijing	Beijing, China	1st place, gold medalist(s)	500 m	44.658
7 Dec 2003	2003–04 ISU World Cup, Beijing	Beijing, China	3rd place, bronze medalist(s)	1000 m	1:36.777
7 Dec 2003	2003–04 ISU World Cup, Beijing	Beijing, China	3rd place, bronze medalist(s)	3000 m	6:09.238
7 Dec 2003	2003–04 ISU World Cup, Beijing	Beijing, China	3rd place, bronze medalist(s)	Overall	68 points
7 Dec 2003	2003–04 ISU World Cup, Beijing	Beijing, China	2nd place, silver medalist(s)	3000 m relay	4:22.200
8 Feb 2004	2003–04 ISU World Cup, Mladá Boleslav	Mladá Boleslav, Czech Republic	2nd place, silver medalist(s)	1000 m	1:32.350
8 Feb 2004	2003–04 ISU World Cup, Mladá Boleslav	Mladá Boleslav, Czech Republic	1st place, gold medalist(s)	3000 m relay	4:19.859
12 Feb 2004	2003–04 ISU World Cup, Bormio	Bormio, Italy	3rd place, bronze medalist(s)	1500 m	2:26.210
13 Feb 2004	2003–04 ISU World Cup, Bormio	Bormio, Italy	2nd place, silver medalist(s)	500 m	43.892
14 Feb 2004	2003–04 ISU World Cup, Bormio	Bormio, Italy	2nd place, silver medalist(s)	1000 m	1:33.276
14 Feb 2004	2003–04 ISU World Cup, Bormio	Bormio, Italy	1st place, gold medalist(s)	3000 m relay	4:17.147
14 Mar 2004	2004 World Team Championships, St. Petersburg	St. Petersburg, Russia	Silver medal	Team	37 points
19 Mar 2004	2004 World Championships, Gothenburg	Gothenburg, Sweden	Silver medal	1500 m	2:28.299
20 Mar 2004	2004 World Championships, Gothenburg	Gothenburg, Sweden	Gold medal	500 m	45.332
21 Mar 2004	2004 World Championships, Gothenburg	Gothenburg, Sweden	Silver medal	Overall	60 points
21 Mar 2004	2004 World Championships, Gothenburg	Gothenburg, Sweden	Silver medal	3000 m relay	4:21.112
22 Oct 2004	2004–05 ISU World Cup, Harbin	(China) Conference Expo & Sports Center	1st place, gold medalist(s)	1500 m	2:27.619
23 Oct 2004	2004–05 ISU World Cup, Harbin	(China) Conference Expo & Sports Center	1st place, gold medalist(s)	500 m	45.037
24 Oct 2004	2004–05 ISU World Cup, Harbin	(China) Conference Expo & Sports Center	2nd place, silver medalist(s)	1000 m	1:33.872
24 Oct 2004	2004–05 ISU World Cup, Harbin	(China) Conference Expo & Sports Center	1st place, gold medalist(s)	Overall	90 points
29 Oct 2004	2004–05 ISU World Cup, Beijing	(China) Capital Gymnasium	3rd place, bronze medalist(s)	1500 m	2:21.127
31 Oct 2004	2004–05 ISU World Cup, Beijing	(China) Capital Gymnasium	2nd place, silver medalist(s)	3000 m relay	4:18.392
27 Nov 2004	2004–05 ISU World Cup, Madison	Madison, United States	2nd place, silver medalist(s)	500 m	44.733
28 Nov 2004	2004–05 ISU World Cup, Madison	Madison, United States	1st place, gold medalist(s)	3000 m	5:35.568
28 Nov 2004	2004–05 ISU World Cup, Madison	Madison, United States	1st place, gold medalist(s)	3000 m relay	4:16.722
4 Dec 2004	2004–05 ISU World Cup, Saguenay	Saguenay, Canada	1st place, gold medalist(s)	500 m	44.867
5 Dec 2004	2004–05 ISU World Cup, Saguenay	Saguenay, Canada	2nd place, silver medalist(s)	3000 m	5:31.936
5 Dec 2004	2004–05 ISU World Cup, Saguenay	Saguenay, Canada	1st place, gold medalist(s)	Overall	55 points
5 Dec 2004	2004–05 ISU World Cup, Saguenay	Saguenay, Canada	1st place, gold medalist(s)	3000 m relay	4:18.222
5 Feb 2005	2004–05 ISU World Cup, Budapest	Budapest, Hungary	2nd place, silver medalist(s)	500 m	45.259
6 Feb 2005	2004–05 ISU World Cup, Budapest	Budapest, Hungary	1st place, gold medalist(s)	3000 m relay	4:22.012
11 Feb 2005	2004–05 ISU World Cup, Spišská Nová Ves	Spišská Nová Ves, Slovakia	1st place, gold medalist(s)	500 m	44.585
12 Feb 2005	2004–05 ISU World Cup, Spišská Nová Ves	Spišská Nová Ves, Slovakia	1st place, gold medalist(s)	3000 m relay	4:18.116
6 Mar 2005	2005 World Team Championships, Chuncheon	(South Korea) Chuncheon, Korea	Silver medal	Team	35 points
11 Mar 2005	2005 World Championships, Beijing	(China) Capital Gymnasium	Bronze medal	1500 m	2:20.876
12 Mar 2005	2005 World Championships, Beijing	(China) Capital Gymnasium	Silver medal	500 m	44.972
13 Mar 2005	2005 World Championships, Beijing	(China) Capital Gymnasium	Bronze medal	1000 m	1:31.343
13 Mar 2005	2005 World Championships, Beijing	(China) Capital Gymnasium	Silver medal	3000 m relay	4:18.889
30 Sep 2005	2005–06 ISU World Cup, Hangzhou	(China) Yellow Dragon Sports Center	1st place, gold medalist(s)	1500 m	2:23.375
1 Oct 2005	2005–06 ISU World Cup, Hangzhou	(China) Yellow Dragon Sports Center	1st place, gold medalist(s)	500 m	44.185
2 Oct 2005	2005–06 ISU World Cup, Hangzhou	(China) Yellow Dragon Sports Center	1st place, gold medalist(s)	1000 m	1:30.172
2 Oct 2005	2005–06 ISU World Cup, Hangzhou	(China) Yellow Dragon Sports Center	1st place, gold medalist(s)	Overall	102 points
2 Oct 2005	2005–06 ISU World Cup, Hangzhou	(China) Yellow Dragon Sports Center	1st place, gold medalist(s)	3000 m relay	4:14.931
8 Oct 2005	2005–06 ISU World Cup, Seoul	(South Korea) Seoul, Korea	1st place, gold medalist(s)	500 m	44.736
9 Oct 2005	2005–06 ISU World Cup, Seoul	(South Korea) Seoul, Korea	1st place, gold medalist(s)	1000 m	1:34.033
9 Oct 2005	2005–06 ISU World Cup, Seoul	(South Korea) Seoul, Korea	1st place, gold medalist(s)	3000 m relay	4:15.883
12 Nov 2005	2005–06 ISU World Cup, Bormio	Bormio, Italy	1st place, gold medalist(s)	500 m	43.708
13 Nov 2005	2005–06 ISU World Cup, Bormio	Bormio, Italy	2nd place, silver medalist(s)	3000 m	5:47.514
13 Nov 2005	2005–06 ISU World Cup, Bormio	Bormio, Italy	2nd place, silver medalist(s)	Overall	60 points
18 Nov 2005	2005–06 ISU World Cup, The Hague	The Hague, Netherlands	2nd place, silver medalist(s)	1500 m	2:24.219
19 Nov 2005	2005–06 ISU World Cup, The Hague	The Hague, Netherlands	1st place, gold medalist(s)	500 m	44.772
20 Nov 2005	2005–06 ISU World Cup, The Hague	The Hague, Netherlands	2nd place, silver medalist(s)	1000 m	1:32.211
20 Nov 2005	2005–06 ISU World Cup, The Hague	The Hague, Netherlands	1st place, gold medalist(s)	Overall	79 points
15 Feb 2006	2006 Winter Olympics, Turin	(Italy) Torino Palavela	Gold medal	500 m	44.345
18 Feb 2006	2006 Winter Olympics, Turin	(Italy) Torino Palavela	Bronze medal	1500 m	2:24.469
25 Feb 2006	2006 Winter Olympics, Turin	(Italy) Torino Palavela	Silver medal	1000 m	1:31.783
26 Mar 2006	2006 World Team Championships, Montreal	(Canada) Maurice Richard Arena	Silver medal	Team	38 points
31 Mar 2006	2006 World Championships, Minneapolis	(United States) Mariucci Arena	Silver medal	1500 m	2:22.027
1 Apr 2006	2006 World Championships, Minneapolis	(United States) Mariucci Arena	Gold medal	500 m	43.904
2 Apr 2006	2006 World Championships, Minneapolis	(United States) Mariucci Arena	Silver medal	1000 m	1:31.649
2 Apr 2006	2006 World Championships, Minneapolis	(United States) Mariucci Arena	Silver medal	3000 m	5:34.522
2 Apr 2006	2006 World Championships, Minneapolis	(United States) Mariucci Arena	Silver medal	Overall	97 points
2 Apr 2006	2006 World Championships, Minneapolis	(United States) Mariucci Arena	Gold medal	3000 m relay	4:17.143
21 Oct 2006	2006–07 ISU World Cup, Changchun	(China) Changchun Wuhuan Gymnasium	1st place, gold medalist(s)	500 m	44.239
22 Oct 2006	2006–07 ISU World Cup, Changchun	(China) Changchun Wuhuan Gymnasium	1st place, gold medalist(s)	1000 m	1:32.788
22 Oct 2006	2006–07 ISU World Cup, Changchun	(China) Changchun Wuhuan Gymnasium	2nd place, silver medalist(s)	3000 m relay	4:20.422
28 Oct 2006	2006–07 ISU World Cup, Jeonju	(South Korea) Hwasan Ice Arena	1st place, gold medalist(s)	1000 m	1:32.897
29 Oct 2006	2006–07 ISU World Cup, Jeonju	(South Korea) Hwasan Ice Arena	1st place, gold medalist(s)	500 m	44.647
22 Oct 2006	2006–07 ISU World Cup, Changchun	(China) Changchun Wuhuan Gymnasium	1st place, gold medalist(s)	3000 m relay	4:18.524
2 Dec 2006	2006–07 ISU World Cup, Saguenay	(Canada) Centre Georges-Vézina	1st place, gold medalist(s)	500 m	44.064
3 Dec 2006	2006–07 ISU World Cup, Saguenay	(Canada) Centre Georges-Vézina	1st place, gold medalist(s)	500 m	43.953
3 Dec 2006	2006–07 ISU World Cup, Saguenay	(Canada) Centre Georges-Vézina	1st place, gold medalist(s)	3000 m relay	4:14.493
9 Dec 2006	2006–07 ISU World Cup, Montreal	(Canada) Maurice Richard Arena	2nd place, silver medalist(s)	1000 m	1:32.785
10 Dec 2006	2006–07 ISU World Cup, Montreal	(Canada) Maurice Richard Arena	2nd place, silver medalist(s)	3000 m relay	4:15.734
29 Jan 2007	2007 Asian Winter Games, Changchun	(China) Changchun Wuhuan Gymnasium	Bronze medal	1500 m	2:24.408
30 Jan 2007	2007 Asian Winter Games, Changchun	(China) Changchun Wuhuan Gymnasium	Gold medal	500 m	43.869
31 Jan 2007	2007 Asian Winter Games, Changchun	(China) Changchun Wuhuan Gymnasium	Silver medal	1000 m	1:33.115
31 Jan 2007	2007 Asian Winter Games, Changchun	(China) Changchun Wuhuan Gymnasium	Gold medal	3000 m relay	4:13.293
10 Feb 2007	2006–07 ISU World Cup, Budapest	Budapest, Hungary	1st place, gold medalist(s)	500 m	44.158
11 Feb 2007	2006–07 ISU World Cup, Budapest	Budapest, Hungary	1st place, gold medalist(s)	500 m	43.858
11 Feb 2007	2006–07 ISU World Cup, Budapest	Budapest, Hungary	1st place, gold medalist(s)	3000 m relay	4:15.379
20 Oct 2007	2007–08 ISU World Cup, Harbin	(China) Conference Expo & Sports Center	1st place, gold medalist(s)	1000 m	1:30.924
21 Oct 2007	2007–08 ISU World Cup, Harbin	(China) Conference Expo & Sports Center	1st place, gold medalist(s)	500 m	43.694
21 Oct 2007	2007–08 ISU World Cup, Harbin	(China) Conference Expo & Sports Center	1st place, gold medalist(s)	3000 m relay	4:13.357
27 Oct 2007	2007–08 ISU World Cup, Kobe	(Japan) Port Island Sports Center	2nd place, silver medalist(s)	1000 m	1:34.025
28 Oct 2007	2007–08 ISU World Cup, Kobe	(Japan) Port Island Sports Center	1st place, gold medalist(s)	500 m	44.858
28 Oct 2007	2007–08 ISU World Cup, Kobe	(Japan) Port Island Sports Center	1st place, gold medalist(s)	3000 m relay	4:20.799
24 Nov 2007	2007–08 ISU World Cup, Heerenveen	(Netherlands) Thialf	1st place, gold medalist(s)	500 m	44.491
25 Nov 2007	2007–08 ISU World Cup, Heerenveen	(Netherlands) Thialf	2nd place, silver medalist(s)	1000 m	1:30.760
25 Nov 2007	2007–08 ISU World Cup, Heerenveen	(Netherlands) Thialf	1st place, gold medalist(s)	3000 m relay	4:15.008
2 Dec 2007	2007–08 ISU World Cup, Turin	(Italy) Torino Palavela	1st place, gold medalist(s)	500 m	43.326
2 Dec 2007	2007–08 ISU World Cup, Turin	(Italy) Torino Palavela	1st place, gold medalist(s)	3000 m relay	4:15.082
3 Feb 2008	2007–08 ISU World Cup, Quebec City	(Canada) Pavillon de la Jeunesse	1st place, gold medalist(s)	500 m	43.286
3 Feb 2008	2007–08 ISU World Cup, Quebec City	(Canada) Pavillon de la Jeunesse	1st place, gold medalist(s)	3000 m relay	4:12.160
9 Feb 2008	2007–08 ISU World Cup, Salt Lake City	(United States) Utah Olympic Oval	1st place, gold medalist(s)	500 m	43.216
10 Feb 2008	2007–08 ISU World Cup, Salt Lake City	(United States) Utah Olympic Oval	1st place, gold medalist(s)	1000 m	1:31.080
10 Feb 2008	2007–08 ISU World Cup, Salt Lake City	(United States) Utah Olympic Oval	1st place, gold medalist(s)	3000 m relay	4:09.981
7 Mar 2008	2008 World Championships, Gangneung	(South Korea) Gangneung International Ice rink	Gold medal	1500 m	2:22.819
8 Mar 2008	2008 World Championships, Gangneung	(South Korea) Gangneung International Ice rink	Gold medal	500 m	43.888
9 Mar 2008	2008 World Championships, Gangneung	(South Korea) Gangneung International Ice rink	Gold medal	1000 m	1:32.527
9 Mar 2008	2008 World Championships, Gangneung	(South Korea) Gangneung International Ice rink	Gold medal	Overall	107 points
9 Mar 2008	2008 World Championships, Gangneung	(South Korea) Gangneung International Ice rink	Bronze medal	3000 m relay	4:19.568
16 Mar 2008	2008 World Team Championships, Harbin	(China) Conference Expo & Sports Center	Gold medal	Team	45 points
18 Oct 2008	2008–09 ISU World Cup, Salt Lake City	(United States) Utah Olympic Oval	1st place, gold medalist(s)	1000 m	1:29.776
19 Oct 2008	2008–09 ISU World Cup, Salt Lake City	(United States) Utah Olympic Oval	1st place, gold medalist(s)	500 m	43.125
19 Oct 2008	2008–09 ISU World Cup, Salt Lake City	(United States) Utah Olympic Oval	1st place, gold medalist(s)	3000 m relay	4:07.179
25 Oct 2008	2008–09 ISU World Cup, Vancouver	(Canada) Pacific Coliseum	1st place, gold medalist(s)	1000 m	1:30.598
26 Oct 2008	2008–09 ISU World Cup, Vancouver	(Canada) Pacific Coliseum	1st place, gold medalist(s)	500 m	43.449
26 Oct 2008	2008–09 ISU World Cup, Vancouver	(Canada) Pacific Coliseum	1st place, gold medalist(s)	3000 m relay	4:11.386
29 Nov 2008	2008–09 ISU World Cup, Beijing	(China) Capital Gymnasium	1st place, gold medalist(s)	500 m	42.609
30 Nov 2008	2008–09 ISU World Cup, Beijing	(China) Capital Gymnasium	1st place, gold medalist(s)	1000 m	1:30.028
30 Nov 2008	2008–09 ISU World Cup, Beijing	(China) Capital Gymnasium	1st place, gold medalist(s)	3000 m relay	4:07.804
6 Dec 2008	2008–09 ISU World Cup, Nagano	(Japan) Wakasato Multiple Sports Arena	1st place, gold medalist(s)	1000 m	1:30.790
7 Dec 2008	2008–09 ISU World Cup, Nagano	(Japan) Wakasato Multiple Sports Arena	1st place, gold medalist(s)	500 m	43.666
7 Dec 2008	2008–09 ISU World Cup, Nagano	(Japan) Wakasato Multiple Sports Arena	1st place, gold medalist(s)	3000 m relay	4:13.253
7 Feb 2009	2008–09 ISU World Cup, Sofia	(Bulgaria) Winter Sports Hall	1st place, gold medalist(s)	1000 m	1:30.510
7 Mar 2009	2009 World Championships, Vienna	(Austria) Ferry-Dusika-Hallenstadion	Gold medal	500 m	43.182
8 Mar 2009	2009 World Championships, Vienna	(Austria) Ferry-Dusika-Hallenstadion	Gold medal	1000 m	1:29.878
8 Mar 2009	2009 World Championships, Vienna	(Austria) Ferry-Dusika-Hallenstadion	Gold medal	Overall	81 points
8 Mar 2009	2009 World Championships, Vienna	(Austria) Ferry-Dusika-Hallenstadion	Gold medal	3000 m relay	4:10.531
15 Mar 2009	2009 World Team Championships, Heerenveen	(Netherlands) Thialf	Gold medal	Team	46 points
19 Sep 2009	2009–10 ISU World Cup, Beijing	(China) Capital Gymnasium	1st place, gold medalist(s)	500 m	43.430
26 Sep 2009	2009–10 ISU World Cup, Seoul	(South Korea) Mokdong Ice Rink	1st place, gold medalist(s)	500 m	43.603
27 Sep 2009	2009–10 ISU World Cup, Seoul	(South Korea) Mokdong Ice Rink	2nd place, silver medalist(s)	1000 m	1:31.287
27 Sep 2009	2009–10 ISU World Cup, Seoul	(South Korea) Mokdong Ice Rink	1st place, gold medalist(s)	3000 m relay	4:13.889
7 Nov 2009	2009–10 ISU World Cup, Montreal	(Canada) Maurice Richard Arena	1st place, gold medalist(s)	500 m	43.515
8 Nov 2009	2009–10 ISU World Cup, Montreal	(Canada) Maurice Richard Arena	2nd place, silver medalist(s)	1000 m	1:30.731
8 Nov 2009	2009–10 ISU World Cup, Montreal	(Canada) Maurice Richard Arena	1st place, gold medalist(s)	3000 m relay	4:13.406
14 Nov 2009	2009–10 ISU World Cup, Marquette	(United States) Berry Events Center	1st place, gold medalist(s)	500 m	42.961
15 Nov 2009	2009–10 ISU World Cup, Marquette	(United States) Berry Events Center	1st place, gold medalist(s)	1000 m	1:29.723
15 Nov 2009	2009–10 ISU World Cup, Marquette	(United States) Berry Events Center	1st place, gold medalist(s)	3000 m relay	4:09.793
17 Feb 2010	2010 Winter Olympics, Vancouver	(Canada) Pacific Coliseum	Gold medal	500 m	42.985
24 Feb 2010	2010 Winter Olympics, Vancouver	(Canada) Pacific Coliseum	Gold medal	3000 m relay	4:06.610
26 Feb 2010	2010 Winter Olympics, Vancouver	(Canada) Pacific Coliseum	Gold medal	1000 m	1:29.213
20 Mar 2010	2010 World Championships, Sofia	(Bulgaria) Winter Sports Hall	Gold medal	500 m	43.353
21 Mar 2010	2010 World Championships, Sofia	(Bulgaria) Winter Sports Hall	Gold medal	1000 m	1:30.572
21 Mar 2010	2010 World Championships, Sofia	(Bulgaria) Winter Sports Hall	Silver medal	Overall	68 points
21 Oct 2012	2012–13 ISU World Cup, Calgary	(Canada) Olympic Oval	1st place, gold medalist(s)	500 m	43.029
21 Oct 2012	2012–13 ISU World Cup, Calgary	(Canada) Olympic Oval	2nd place, silver medalist(s)	3000 m relay	4:07.530
27 Oct 2012	2012–13 ISU World Cup, Montreal	(Canada) Maurice Richard Arena	1st place, gold medalist(s)	500 m	43.885
28 Oct 2012	2012–13 ISU World Cup, Montreal	(Canada) Maurice Richard Arena	1st place, gold medalist(s)	3000 m relay	4:14.305
2 Dec 2012	2012–13 ISU World Cup, Nagoya	(Japan) Nippon Gaishi Hall	1st place, gold medalist(s)	500 m	43.476
2 Dec 2012	2012–13 ISU World Cup, Nagoya	(Japan) Nippon Gaishi Hall	1st place, gold medalist(s)	3000 m relay	4:11.843
8 Dec 2012	2012–13 ISU World Cup, Shanghai	(China) Oriental Sports Center	2nd place, silver medalist(s)	1000 m	1:30.558
9 Dec 2012	2012–13 ISU World Cup, Shanghai	(China) Oriental Sports Center	1st place, gold medalist(s)	500 m	43.159
9 Dec 2012	2012–13 ISU World Cup, Shanghai	(China) Oriental Sports Center	1st place, gold medalist(s)	3000 m relay	4:07.660
2 Feb 2013	2012–13 ISU World Cup, Sochi	(Russia) Iceberg Skating Palace	1st place, gold medalist(s)	500 m	43.019
3 Feb 2013	2012–13 ISU World Cup, Sochi	(Russia) Iceberg Skating Palace	1st place, gold medalist(s)	3000 m relay	4:10.425
10 Feb 2013	2012–13 ISU World Cup, Dresden	(Germany) EnergieVerbund Arena	1st place, gold medalist(s)	500 m	42.597
10 Feb 2013	2012–13 ISU World Cup, Dresden	(Germany) EnergieVerbund Arena	3rd place, bronze medalist(s)	3000 m relay	4:13.148
9 Mar 2013	2013 World Championships, Debrecen	(Hungary) Főnix Hall	Gold medal	500 m	43.177
10 Mar 2013	2013 World Championships, Debrecen	(Hungary) Főnix Hall	Gold medal	1000 m	1:31.460
10 Mar 2013	2013 World Championships, Debrecen	(Hungary) Főnix Hall	Gold medal	Overall	68 points
10 Mar 2013	2013 World Championships, Debrecen	(Hungary) Főnix Hall	Gold medal	3000 m relay	4:14.104
29 Sep 2013	2013–14 ISU World Cup, Shanghai	(China) Oriental Sports Center	2nd place, silver medalist(s)	3000 m relay	4:08.405
5 Oct 2013	2013–14 ISU World Cup, Seoul	(South Korea) Mokdong Ice Rink	1st place, gold medalist(s)	500 m	42.997
6 Oct 2013	2013–14 ISU World Cup, Seoul	(South Korea) Mokdong Ice Rink	2nd place, silver medalist(s)	3000 m relay	4:08.128
9 Nov 2013	2013–14 ISU World Cup, Turin	(Italy) PalaTazzoli	1st place, gold medalist(s)	500 m	42.934
10 Nov 2013	2013–14 ISU World Cup, Turin	(Italy) PalaTazzoli	2nd place, silver medalist(s)	3000 m relay	4:11.404
16 Nov 2013	2013–14 ISU World Cup, Kolomna	(Russia) Kolomna Speed Skating Centre	1st place, gold medalist(s)	500 m	42.797
17 Nov 2013	2013–14 ISU World Cup, Kolomna	(Russia) Kolomna Speed Skating Centre	1st place, gold medalist(s)	3000 m relay	4:06.785
