= Paul Stanley (speed skater) =

British speed skater

Personal information
- Nationality: British
- Born: 22 August 1983 (age 42) Solihull, England

Sport
- Sport: Short track speed skating
Medal record
Men's short track speed skating
Representing Great Britain
World Championships
| Bronze medal – third place | 2008 Gangneung | 5000 m relay |
| Bronze medal – third place | 2014 Montréal | 5000 m relay |

Paul Stanley (born 22 August 1983) is a British short track speed skater. He competed in two events at the 2006 Winter Olympics.
