= Jessica Gregg =

Canadian speed skater

Personal information
- Born: March 16, 1988 (age 38) Edmonton, Alberta, Canada
- Height: 178 cm (5 ft 10 in)
- Weight: 59 kg (130 lb)

Sport
- Country: Canada
- Sport: Short track speed skating

Achievements and titles
- Personal best(s): 500 m: 43.351(2009) CR; 1000 m: (2009); 1500 m: (2009); 3000 m: (2009)
Medal record
Women's short track speed skating
Representing Canada
Olympic Games
Silver medal – second place	2010 Vancouver	3000 m relay
World Championships
Silver medal – second place	2008 Gangneung	3000 m relay
Silver medal – second place	2010 Sofia	3000 m relay
Silver medal – second place	2010 Bormio	Team
Bronze medal – third place	2009 Vienna	500 m
Bronze medal – third place	2009 Vienna	3000 m relay

Jessica Gregg (born March 16, 1988) is a former Canadian short track speed skater.

== Personal life ==
Born in Edmonton, Alberta, Jessica comes from a strong pedigree of skaters as her mother Kathy Vogt was a two time Olympian in the sport and her father Dr. Randy Gregg was a member of the Edmonton Oilers dynasty in the 1980s. Her sister Sarah Gregg was an international speed skater and her brother Jamie Gregg was a member of the national team for the 500 m in Long Track Speed Skating; who joined his sister at the 2010 and 2014 Winter Olympics.

== Career ==
Jessica Gregg was the only member of the 2010 Canadian Olympic short track team outside of Quebec. Jessica won her first ever World Cup gold medal in 500 m short track speedskating in February 2009.

Gregg won a bronze medal in the 500 metres during the 2009 World Short Track Speed Skating Championships, she also won another bronze in the women's 3000 m relay at the same championship. During the 2008 World Short Track Speed Skating Championships she won a silver medal as participant in the women's relay along with fellow speed skaters Kalyna Roberge, and Tania Vicent. She won her first World Championship gold medal in Sofia in 2009. Going into the 2010 Olympics, Gregg was a medal contender in the 500 m and the 3,000 m relay. In the final at the Vancouver Olympics Gregg suffered through numerous first corner falls and restarts both in the quarterfinals and finals. In the final she was pushed out of the way by Arianna Fontana and was out of the race by the end of the first corner. Gregg finished 4th in the 500 m. On February 24, she won a silver medal in the 3,000 metre relay, along with Tania Vicent, Kalyna Roberge and Marianne St-Gelais.

On February 4, 2016 she announced her retirement.
