= 2006–07 ISU Short Track Speed Skating World Cup =

International speed skating competition

ISU Short Track World Cup
- Dates: 20 October 2006 – 11 February 2007

The 2007 Short Track Speed Skating World Cup was a multi-race tournament over a season for short track speed skating. The season began on 20 October 2006 and ended on 11 February 2007. The World Cup was organised by the ISU who also ran world cups and championships in speed skating and figure skating.

== Calendar ==
=== Men ===
Date	Place	Disc.	Winner	Second	Third
20 October 2006	Changchun, China	1500m (1)	(South Korea) Ahn Hyun-soo	(South Korea) Lee Ho-suk	(China) Li Ye
21 October 2006	Changchun, China	500m	(Canada) François-Louis Tremblay	(Canada) Olivier Jean	(South Korea) Kim Byeong-jun
21 October 2006	Changchun, China	1000m	(South Korea) Ahn Hyun-soo	(Canada) François-Louis Tremblay	(Canada) Mathieu Giroux
22 October 2006	Changchun, China	1500m (2)	(South Korea) Kim Hyun-kon	(South Korea) Song Kyung-taek	(Canada) Charles Hamelin
22 October 2006	Changchun, China	5000m	South Korea; Kim Byeong-jun; Kim Hyun-kon; Song Kyung-taek; Ahn Hyun-soo	Canada; Olivier Jean; Steve Robillard; Charles Hamelin; François-Louis Tremblay	China; Li Ye; Liu Xiaoliang; Sui Baoku; Li Haonan
27 October 2006	Jeonju, South Korea	1000m (1)	(South Korea) Lee Ho-suk	(Canada) Charles Hamelin	(Canada) Olivier Jean
28 October 2006	Jeonju, South Korea	500m	(Canada) François-Louis Tremblay	(Japan) Takahiro Fujimoto	(South Korea) Song Kyung-taek
28 October 2006	Jeonju, South Korea	1500m	(South Korea) Ahn Hyun-soo	(South Korea) Kim Hyun-kon	(South Korea) Song Kyung-taek
29 October 2006	Jeonju, South Korea	1000m (2)	(South Korea) Kim Hyun-kon	(Canada) Marc-André Monette	(South Korea) Ahn Hyun-soo
29 October 2006	Jeonju, South Korea	5000m	Canada; François-Louis Tremblay; Charles Hamelin; Steve Robillard; Olivier Jean	China; Li Ye; Li Haonan; Sui Baoku; Liu Xiaoliang	South Korea; Song Kyung-taek; Kim Hyun-kon; Ahn Hyun-soo; Kim Byeong-jun
1 December 2006	Saguenay, Quebec, Canada	1500m	(South Korea) Kim Hyun-kon	(Canada) Charles Hamelin	(China) Li Ye
2 December 2006	Saguenay, Quebec, Canada	500m (1)	(Canada) François-Louis Tremblay	(Canada) Olivier Jean	(South Korea) Lee Ho-suk
3 December 2006	Saguenay, Quebec, Canada	500m (2)	(Canada) Charles Hamelin	(China) Hu Ze	(Canada) Jeff Scholten
3 December 2006	Saguenay, Quebec, Canada	1000m	(South Korea) Ahn Hyun-soo	(South Korea) Lee Ho-suk	(South Korea) Kim Byeong-jun
3 December 2006	Saguenay, Quebec, Canada	5000m	South Korea; Ahn Hyun-soo; Kim Byeong-jun; Kim Hyun-kon; Song Kyung-taek	China; Li Ye; Wang Hongyang; Sui Baoku; Li Haonan	United States; J. P. Kepka; Jordan Malone; Ryan Bedford; Travis Jayner
8 December 2006	Montreal, Quebec, Canada	1500m (1)	(South Korea) Ahn Hyun-soo	(South Korea) Kim Hyun-kon	(China) Hu Ze
9 December 2006	Montreal, Quebec, Canada	1000m	(Canada) Charles Hamelin	(United States) Jordan Malone	(Italy) Denis Bellotti
10 December 2006	Montreal, Quebec, Canada	1500m (2)	(South Korea) Song Kyung-Taek	(South Korea) Ahn Hyun-Soo	(South Korea) Kim Hyun-Kon
10 December 2006	Montreal, Quebec, Canada	500m	(Canada) Olivier Jean	(Canada) Francois-Louis Tremblay	(Germany) Tyson Heung
10 December 2006	Montreal, Quebec, Canada	5000m	South Korea; Ahn Hyun-Soo; Kim Byeong-jun; Kim Hyun-Kon; Song Kyung-Taek	(Canada) Canada; François-Louis Tremblay; Charles Hamelin; Marc-André Monette; Olivier Jean	(Germany) Germany; Paul Herrmann; Robert Becker; Sebastian Praus; Tyson Heung
2–4 February 2007	Heerenveen, Netherlands	1500m	(United States) Jordan Malone	(Belgium) Pieter Gysel	(United States) Ryan Bedford
2–4 February 2007	Heerenveen, Netherlands	1000m(1)	(Italy) Nicola Rodigari	(Belgium) Wim de Deyne	(United States) J. P. Kepka
2–4 February 2007	Heerenveen, Netherlands	500m	(United Kingdom) Jon Eley	(Germany) Tyson Heung	(Italy) Roberto Serra
2–4 February 2007	Heerenveen, Netherlands	1000m(2)	(United States) Jordan Malone	(Italy) Yuri Confortola	(Latvia) Haralds Silovs
2–4 February 2007	Heerenveen, Netherlands	5000m Relay	(Italy) Italy; Yuri Confortola; Denis Bellotti; Nicola Rodigari; Roberto Serra	(Germany) Germany; Paul Herrmann; Robert Becker; Torsten Kroeger; Tyson Heung	(France) France; Benoit Anterieux; Thibaut Fauconnet; Jean Charles Mattei; Maxime Chataignier
8–10 February 2007	Budapest, Hungary	1500m	(South Korea) Lee Ho-Suk	(South Korea) Song Kyung-Taek	(Canada) Olivier Jean
8–10 February 2007	Budapest, Hungary	500m(1)	(Canada) Charles Hamelin	(Canada) François-Louis Tremblay	(South Korea) Lee Seung-Hoon
8–10 February 2007	Budapest, Hungary	500m(2)	(Canada) Olivier Jean	(Italy) Roberto Serra	(Germany) Tyson Heung
8–10 February 2007	Budapest, Hungary	1000m	(South Korea) Lee Ho-suk	(Canada) Charles Hamelin	(United States) Jordan Malone
8–10 February 2007	Budapest, Hungary	5000m Relay	(China) China; Hu Ze; Li Ye; Liu Xiaoliang; Sui Baoku	(South Korea) South Korea; Kim Hyun-kon; Lee Ho-suk; Lee Seung-hoon; Song Kyung-taek	(United States) United States; Alex Izykowski; Jordan Malone; Ryan Bedford; Travis Jayner

=== Women ===
Date	Place	Disc.	Winner	Second	Third
20 October 2006	Changchun, China	1500m (1)	(South Korea) Jin Sun-Yu	(South Korea) Jung Eun-Ju	(South Korea) Byun Chun-Sa
21 October 2006	Changchun, China	500m	(China) Wang Meng	(China) Fu Tianyu	(China) Zhu Mile
21 October 2006	Changchun, China	1000m	(China) Wang Meng	(South Korea) Jin Sun-Yu	(South Korea) Byun Chun-Sa
22 October 2006	Changchun, China	1500m (2)	(South Korea) Kim Min-Jung	(China) Fu Tianyu	(Czech Republic) Kateřina Novotná
22 October 2006	Changchun, China	3000m	South Korea; Jin Sun-Yu; Jung Eun-Ju; Jeon Ji-Soo; Byun Chun-Sa	China; Zhu Mile; Liu Xiaoying; Wang Meng; Fu Tianyu	Canada; Raphaele Lemieux; Anouk Leblanc-Boucher; Kalyna Roberge; Amanda Overland
27 October 2006	Jeonju, South Korea	1000m (1)	(China) Wang Meng	(China) Zhu Mile	(South Korea) Jeon Ji-Soo
28 October 2006	Jeonju, South Korea	500m	(China) Wang Meng	(China) Fu Tianyu	(Bulgaria) Evgenia Radanova
28 October 2006	Jeonju, South Korea	1500m	(South Korea) Kim Min-Jung	(China) Liu Xiaoying	(China) Cheng Xiaolei
29 October 2006	Jeonju, South Korea	1000m (2)	(South Korea) Jung Eun-Ju	(South Korea) Jin Sun-Yu	(China) Zhu Mile
29 October 2006	Jeonju, South Korea	3000m	China; Liu Xiaoying; Zhu Mile; Fu Tianyu; Wang Meng	South Korea; Jeon Ji-Soo; Byun Chun-Sa; Jung Eun-Ju; Jin Sun-Yu	Japan; Biba Sakurai; Miyuki Ozawa; Mika Ozawa; Yuka Kamino
1 December 2006	Saguenay, Quebec, Canada	1500m	(South Korea) Jin Sun-Yu	(South Korea) Jung Eun-Ju	(South Korea) Byun Chun-Sa
2 December 2006	Saguenay, Quebec, Canada	500m (1)	(China) Wang Meng	(Canada) Kalyna Roberge	(Canada) Jessica Gregg
3 December 2006	Saguenay, Quebec, Canada	500m (2)	(China) Wang Meng	(Bulgaria) Evgenia Radanova	(South Korea) Jeon Ji-Soo
3 December 2006	Saguenay, Quebec, Canada	1000m	(Canada) Kalyna Roberge	(South Korea) Byun Chun-Sa	(South Korea) Jin Sun-Yu
3 December 2006	Saguenay, Quebec, Canada	3000m	China; Fu Tianyu; Cheng Xiaolei; Zhu Mile; Wang Meng	South Korea; Jung Eun-Ju; Jeon Ji-Soo; Kim Min-Jung; Byun Chun-Sa	Canada; Kalyna Roberge; Annik Plamondon; Anne Maltais; Amanda Overland
8 December 2006	Montreal, Quebec, Canada	1500m (1)	(South Korea) Jung Eun-Ju	(South Korea) Kim Min-Jung	(China) Fu Tianyu
9 December 2006	Montreal, Quebec, Canada	1000m	(South Korea) Byun Chun-Sa	(China) Wang Meng	(South Korea) Jin Sun-Yu
10 December 2006	Montreal, Quebec, Canada	1500m (2)	(South Korea) Jin Sun-Yu	(South Korea) Jung Eun-Ju	(South Korea) Byun Chun-Sa
10 December 2006	Montreal, Quebec, Canada	500m	(Canada) Kalyna Roberge	(South Korea) Kim Min-Jung	(China) Cheng Xiao Lei
10 December 2006	Montreal, Quebec, Canada	3000m	(Canada) Canada; Amanda Overland; Anne Maltais; Ivanie Blondin; Kalyna Roberge	(China) China; Cheng Xiao Lei; Fu Tian Yu; Liu Xiao Ying; Zhu Mi Lei	(South Korea) Korea; Byun Chun-Sa; Jeon Ji-Soo; Jin Sun-Yu; Jung Eun-Ju
2–4 February 2006	Heerenveen, Netherlands	1500m	(France) Stéphanie Bouvier	(Austria) Veronika Windisch	(Bulgaria) Marina Georgieva-Nikolova
2–4 February 2006	Heerenveen, Netherlands	1000m(1)	(Bulgaria) Evgenia Radanova	(Italy) Marta Capurso	(Germany) Christin Priebst
2–4 February 2006	Heerenveen, Netherlands	500m	(France) Stéphanie Bouvier	(United Kingdom) Sarah Lindsay	(Italy) Arianna Fontana
2–4 February 2006	Heerenveen, Netherlands	1000m(2)	(Italy) Marta Capurso	(Italy) Katia Zini	(Germany) Christin Priebst
2–4 February 2006	Heerenveen, Netherlands	3000m Relay	(Italy) Italy; Arianna Fontana; Katia Zini; Maffei Cecilia; Marta Capurso	(Russia) Russia; Ekaterina Belova; Olga Belyakova; Olga Maskaikina; Valeriya Reznik	(United States) United States; Cherise Wilkins; Kimberly Derrick; Sophia Milan; Tina Koenig
9–11 February 2006	Budapest, Hungary	1500m	(South Korea) Jung Eun-Ju	(South Korea) Byun Chun-Sa	(South Korea) Kim Min-Jung
9–11 February 2006	Budapest, Hungary	500m(1)	(China) Wang Meng	(China) Zhu Mi Lei	(South Korea) Jeon Ji-Soo
9–11 February 2006	Budapest, Hungary	500m(2)	(China) Wang Meng	(China) Fu Tian Yu	(South Korea) Jeon Ji-Soo
9–11 February 2006	Budapest, Hungary	1000m	(South Korea) Jung Eun-Ju	(South Korea) Byun Chun-Sa	(China) Zhou Yang
9–11 February 2006	Budapest, Hungary	3000m Relay	(China) China; Cheng Xiao Lei; Fu Tian Yu; Wang Meng; Zhu Mi Lei	(South Korea) Korea; Byun Chun-Sa; Jeon Ji-Soo; Jung Eun-Ju; Kim Min-Jung	(Italy) Italy; Arianna Fontana; Katia Zini; Maffei Cecilia; Marta Capurso

== Rankings ==
=== Men ===
500 m

Rank	Name	Points
1	(Germany) Tyson Heung	567
2	(United Kingdom) Jon Eley	566
3	(Italy) Roberto Serra	557
4	(China) Liu Xiaoliang	541
5	(Japan) Satoru Terao	536
6	(France) Benoit Anterieux	524
7	(Belgium) Wim De Deyne	518
8	(Canada) François-Louis Tremblay	498

1000 m

Rank	Name	Points
1	(South Korea) Lee Ho-suk	589
2	(Italy) Denis Bellotti	570
3	(Italy) Nicola Rodigari	568
4	(Netherlands) Niels Kerstholt	499
5	(Belgium) Wim De Deyne	494
6	(United States) Travis Jayner	490
7	(Australia) Ben Southee	483
8	(Ukraine) Volodymyr Cherneha	458

1500 m

Rank	Name	Points
1	(South Korea) Kim Hyun-kon	593
2	(South Korea) Song Kyung-taek	588
3	(Belgium) Pieter Gysel	553
4	(China) Sui Baoku	552
5	(Italy) Yuri Confortola	548
6	(Australia) Alexander Merriman	540
7	(Italy) Fabio Carta	533
8	(United States) Ryan Bedford	532

5000 m relay

Rank	Team	Points
1	Italy	582
2	United States	578
3	Germany	574
4	Ukraine	541
5	South Korea	497
6	China	488
7	Canada	488
8	Australia	463

=== Women ===
500 m

Rank	Name	Points
1	(China) Wang Meng	600
2	(Italy) Arianna Fontana	579
3	(South Korea) Kim Min-jung	573
4	(South Korea) Jeon Ji-soo	573
5	(United Kingdom) Sarah Lindsay	565
6	(Germany) Susanne Rudolph	547
7	(United States) Cherise Wilkins	522
8	(Russia) Ekaterina Belova	519

1000 m

Rank	Name	Points
1	(South Korea) Byun Chun-sa	589
2	(China) Zhu Mi Lei	578
3	(Italy) Marta Capurso	572
4	(United States) Kimberly Derrick	531
5	(Austria) Veronika Windisch	520
6	(South Korea) Jin Sun-yu	499
7	(Australia) Emily Rosemond	490
8	(Canada) Amanda Overland	489

1500 m

Rank	Name	Points
1	(South Korea) Jung Eun-ju	592
2	(China) Liu Xiao Ying	576
3	(Italy) Katia Zini	557
4	(Czech Republic) Kateřina Novotná	554
5	(Japan) Yuka Kamino	547
6	(Austria) Veronika Windisch	529
7	(Italy) Cecilia Maffei	510
8	(Poland) Karolina Regucka	490

3000 m relay

Rank	Team	Points
1	Italy	585
2	Germany	572
3	United States	568
4	China	498
5	South Korea	495
6	Russia	474
7	Canada	393
8	Japan	386

== Podium summary ==
Rank	Nation	Gold	Silver	Bronze	Total
1	South Korea (KOR)	26	21	21	68
2	China (CHN)	12	13	10	35
3	Canada (CAN)	12	12	9	33
4	Italy (ITA)	4	4	4	12
5	United States (USA)	2	1	5	8
6	France (FRA)	2	0	1	3
7	Bulgaria (BUL)	1	1	2	4
8	Great Britain (GBR)	1	1	0	2
9	Germany (GER)	0	2	5	7
10	Belgium (BEL)	0	2	0	2
11	Japan (JPN)	0	1	1	2
12	Austria (AUT)	0	1	0	1
12	Russia (RUS)	0	1	0	1
14	Czech Republic (CZE)	0	0	1	1
14	Latvia (LAT)	0	0	1	1
Totals (15 entries)		60	60	60	180

== See also ==
- 2007 World Short Track Speed Skating Championships
- 2007 World Short Track Speed Skating Team Championships
- 2007 European Short Track Speed Skating Championships
