= 2008–09 ISU Short Track Speed Skating World Cup =

International speed skating competition

ISU Short Track World Cup
- Dates: 18 October 2008 – 15 February 2009

The 2008–09 Short Track Speed Skating World Cup was a multi-race tournament over a season for short track speed skating. The season began on 18 October 2008 and ended on 15 February 2009. The World Cup was organised by the ISU who also ran world cups and championships in speed skating and figure skating.

== Calendar ==
=== Men ===
==== United States ====
Date	Place	Distance	Winner	Second	Third
18 October 2008	(United States) Salt Lake City	1000m	(South Korea) Kwak Yoon-gy	(South Korea) Lee Ho-suk	(South Korea) Lee Jung-su
18 October 2008	(United States) Salt Lake City	1500m (1)	(South Korea) Sung Si-bak	(Canada) Charles Hamelin	(United States) Jeff Simon
19 October 2008	(United States) Salt Lake City	500m	(South Korea) Sung Si-bak	(Canada) Charles Hamelin	(Canada) François-Louis Tremblay
19 October 2008	(United States) Salt Lake City	1500m (2)	(South Korea) Lee Jung-su	(South Korea) Lee Ho-suk	(United States) Apolo Ohno
19 October 2008	(United States) Salt Lake City	5000m relay	South Korea	United States	Canada

==== Canada ====
Date	Place	Distance	Winner	Second	Third
25 October 2008	(Canada) Pacific Coliseum, Vancouver	1000m (1)	(Canada) Charles Hamelin	(United States) Anthony Lobello	(Canada) François Hamelin
25 October 2008	(Canada) Pacific Coliseum, Vancouver	1500m	(South Korea) Lee Jung-su	(South Korea) Sung Si-bak	(United States) Jeff Simon
26 October 2008	(Canada) Pacific Coliseum, Vancouver	500m	(South Korea) Lee Ho-suk	(Canada) François-Louis Tremblay	(South Korea) Kwak Yoon-gy
26 October 2008	(Canada) Pacific Coliseum, Vancouver	1000m (2)	(South Korea) Lee Jung-su	(Canada) Michael Gilday	(Canada) Rémi Beaulieu-Tinker
26 October 2008	(Canada) Pacific Coliseum, Vancouver	5000m relay	United States	Canada	(United Kingdom) Great Britain

==== China ====
Date	Place	Distance	Winner	Second	Third
29 November 2008	(China) Beijing	500m (1)	(Canada) Charles Hamelin	(Canada) François-Louis Tremblay	(China) Wang Hong Yang
29 November 2008	(China) Beijing	500m (2)	(Canada) Olivier Jean	(South Korea) Sung Si-bak	(China) Sui Bao Ku
29 November 2008	(China) Beijing	1500m	(South Korea) Sung Si-bak	(Canada) Olivier Jean	(South Korea) Park Jin-hwan
30 November 2008	(China) Beijing	1000m	(South Korea) Lee Ho-suk	(South Korea) Kwak Yoon-gy	(Canada) Charles Hamelin
30 November 2008	(China) Beijing	5000m relay	United States	Canada	China

==== Japan ====
Date	Place	Distance	Winner	Second	Third
6 December 2008	(Japan) Nagano	1000m	(South Korea) Lee Ho-suk	(South Korea) Kwak Yoon-gy	(Canada) Charles Hamelin
6 December 2008	(Japan) Nagano	1500m (1)	(South Korea) Lee Jung-su	(South Korea) Sung Si-bak	(Canada) François-Louis Tremblay
7 December 2008	(Japan) Nagano	500m	(South Korea) Sung Si-bak	(China) Han Jialiang	(France) Thibaut Fauconnet
7 December 2008	(Japan) Nagano	1500m (2)	(South Korea) Lee Ho-suk	(Canada) Charles Hamelin	(Canada) Olivier Jean
7 December 2008	(Japan) Nagano	5000m relay	Canada	South Korea	China

==== Bulgaria ====
Date	Place	Distance	Winner	Second	Third
7 February 2009	(Bulgaria) Sofia	1000m (1)	(South Korea) Kwak Yoon-gy	(South Korea) Lee Jung-su	(Canada) François-Louis Tremblay
7 February 2009	(Bulgaria) Sofia	1500m	(South Korea) Lee Ho-suk	(South Korea) Sung Si-bak	(Canada) Charles Hamelin
8 February 2009	(Bulgaria) Sofia	500m	(Canada) François-Louis Tremblay	(United Kingdom) Jon Eley	(United States) Jeff Simon
8 February 2009	(Bulgaria) Sofia	1000m (2)	(South Korea) Lee Ho-suk	(United States) Jordan Malone	(South Korea) Lee Jung-su
8 February 2009	(Bulgaria) Sofia	5000m relay	Canada	China	Germany

==== Germany ====
Date	Place	Distance	Winner	Second	Third
14 February 2009	(Germany) Dresden	500m (1)	(South Korea) Lee Ho-suk	(South Korea) Kwak Yoon-gy	(Italy) Nicola Rodigari
14 February 2009	(Germany) Dresden	1500m	(United States) J. R. Celski	(Italy) Yuri Confortola	(Canada) Rémi Beaulieu-Tinker
15 February 2009	(Germany) Dresden	500m (2)	(United States) Anthony Lobello Jr.	(United Kingdom) Jon Eley	(Japan) Satoshi Sakashita
15 February 2009	(Germany) Dresden	1000m	(South Korea) Lee Ho-suk	(United States) J. R. Celski	(Italy) Yuri Confortola
15 February 2009	(Germany) Dresden	5000m relay	China	South Korea	Germany

=== Women ===
==== United States ====
Date	Place	Distance	Winner	Second	Third
18 October 2008	(United States) Salt Lake City	1500m (1)	(China) Zhou Yang	(South Korea) Jung Ba-ra	(South Korea) Yang Shin-young
18 October 2008	(United States) Salt Lake City	1500m (2)	(South Korea) Shin Sae-bom	(China) Zhou Yang	(China) Sun Linlin
19 October 2008	(United States) Salt Lake City	500m	(China) Wang Meng	(China) Liu Qiuhong	(Canada) Jessica Gregg
19 October 2008	(United States) Salt Lake City	1000m	(China) Wang Meng	(South Korea) Shin Sae-bom	(United States) Kimberly Derrick
19 October 2008	(United States) Salt Lake City	3000m relay	China	South Korea	Canada

==== Canada ====
Date	Place	Distance	Winner	Second	Third
25 October 2008	(Canada) Pacific Coliseum, Vancouver	1000m (1)	(China) Wang Meng	(China) Liu Qiuhong	(South Korea) Yang Shin-young
25 October 2008	(Canada) Pacific Coliseum, Vancouver	1500m	(China) Zhou Yang	(South Korea) Jung Eun-ju	(South Korea) Shin Sae-bom
26 October 2008	(Canada) Pacific Coliseum, Vancouver	500m	(China) Wang Meng	(Canada) Marianne St-Gelais	(South Korea) Yang Shin-young
26 October 2008	(Canada) Pacific Coliseum, Vancouver	1000m (2)	(South Korea) Shin Sae-bom	(China) Zhou Yang	(United States) Allison Baver
26 October 2008	(Canada) Pacific Coliseum, Vancouver	3000m relay	China	South Korea	Canada

==== China ====
Date	Place	Distance	Winner	Second	Third
29 November 2008	(China) Beijing	1500m	(South Korea) Jung Eun-ju	(China) Zhou Yang	(United States) Allison Baver
29 November 2008	(China) Beijing	500m (1)	(China) Wang Meng	(China) Liu Qiuhong	(Australia) Tatiana Borodulina
30 November 2008	(China) Beijing	500m (2)	(China) Liu Qiuhong	(China) Fu Tianyu	(China) Zhao Nannan
30 November 2008	(China) Beijing	1000m	(China) Wang Meng	(China) Zhou Yang	(South Korea) Shin Sae-bom
29 October 2008	(China) Beijing	3000m relay	China	South Korea	Italy

==== Japan ====
Date	Place	Distance	Winner	Second	Third
6 December 2008	(Japan) Nagano	1000m	(China) Wang Meng	(China) Liu Qiuhong	(South Korea) Yang Shin-young
6 December 2008	(Japan) Nagano	1500m (1)	(South Korea) Kim Min-jung	(South Korea) Shin Sae-bom	(United States) Allison Baver
7 December 2008	(Japan) Nagano	500m	(China) Wang Meng	(China) Liu Qiuhong	(China) Fu Tianyu
7 December 2008	(Japan) Nagano	1500m (2)	(South Korea) Shin Sae-bom	(United States) Katherine Reutter	(South Korea) Kim Min-jung
7 December 2008	(Japan) Nagano	3000m relay	China	South Korea	Canada

==== Bulgaria ====
Date	Place	Distance	Winner	Second	Third
7 February 2009	(Bulgaria) Sofia	1000m (1)	(China) Wang Meng	(China) Liu Qiuhong	(Canada) Kalyna Roberge
7 February 2009	(Bulgaria) Sofia	1500m	(South Korea) Jung Eun-ju	(United States) Katherine Reutter	(China) Zhou Yang
8 February 2009	(Bulgaria) Sofia	500m	(Canada) Jessica Gregg	(Italy) Arianna Fontana	(China) Meng Xiaoxue
8 February 2009	(Bulgaria) Sofia	1000m (2)	(South Korea) Kim Min-jung	(China) Liu Qiuhong	(United States) Kimberly Derrick
8 February 2009	(Bulgaria) Sofia	3000m relay	Canada	Italy	United States

==== Germany ====
Date	Place	Distance	Winner	Second	Third
14 February 2009	(Germany) Dresden	500m (1)	(Australia) Tatiana Borodulina	(China) Fu Tianyu	(Italy) Arianna Fontana
14 February 2009	(Germany) Dresden	1500m	(South Korea) Kim Min-jung	(United States) Katherine Reutter	(China) Zhang Hui
15 February 2009	(Germany) Dresden	500m (2)	(Australia) Tatiana Borodulina	(Italy) Arianna Fontana	(Bulgaria) Evgenia Radanova
15 February 2009	(Germany) Dresden	1000m	(United States) Kimberly Derrick	(United States) Katherine Reutter	(South Korea) Jung Eun-ju
15 February 2009	(Germany) Dresden	3000m relay	United States	Italy	South Korea

== Overall standings ==
=== Men ===
Distance	Winner	Second	Third
500m	(Canada) François-Louis Tremblay	(South Korea) Sung Si-bak	(United Kingdom) Jon Eley
1000m	(South Korea) Lee Ho-suk	(South Korea) Kwak Yoon-gy	(South Korea) Lee Jung-su
1500m	(South Korea) Sung Si-bak	(South Korea) Lee Jung-su	(South Korea) Lee Ho-suk
5000m relay	Canada	United States	South Korea

=== Women ===
Distance	Winner	Second	Third
500m	(China) Wang Meng	(China) Liu Qiuhong	(Australia) Tatiana Borodulina
1000m	(China) Wang Meng	(China) Liu Qiuhong	(United States) Kimberly Derrick
1500m	(China) Zhou Yang	(South Korea) Shin Sae-bom	(South Korea) Kim Min-jung
3000m relay	China	South Korea	Canada

== See also ==
- 2009 World Short Track Speed Skating Championships
- 2009 World Short Track Speed Skating Team Championships
- 2009 European Short Track Speed Skating Championships
