= Short-track speed skating at the 2010 Winter Olympics – Men's 500 metres =

Men's 500 metres at the XXI Olympic Winter Games
- Pictogram for short track
- Venue: Pacific Coliseum
- Dates: February 24, 2010 (qualifying heats); February 26, 2010 (quarterfinal, semifinal, and final)
- Competitors: 32 from 16 nations
- Winning time: 40.981

Medalists
1st place, gold medalist(s)		Charles Hamelin	Canada
2nd place, silver medalist(s)		Sung Si-bak	South Korea
3rd place, bronze medalist(s)		François-Louis Tremblay	Canada

The men's 500 metres in short track speed skating at the 2010 Winter Olympics was held 24–26 February 2010 at the Pacific Coliseum in Vancouver, British Columbia, Canada.

The qualifying heats were held on 24 February with the quarterfinal, the semifinal and the final were held on 26 February.

== Results ==
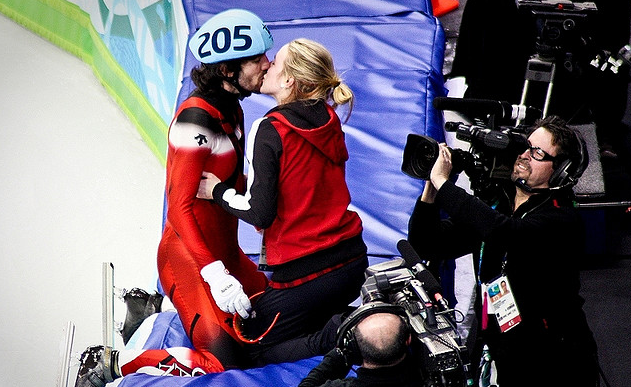
Hamelin kisses his girlfriend after winning the gold medal.

There were thirty-two competitors representing sixteen nations.

=== Heats ===
Rank	Heat	Name	Country	Time	Notes
1	1	Sung Si-bak	South Korea	41.889	Q
2	1	Niels Kerstholt	Netherlands	42.180	Q
3	1	Nicolas Bean	Italy	42.344	
4	1	Takahiro Fujimoto	Japan	42.366	
1	2	Lee Ho-suk	South Korea	41.632	Q
2	2	Simon Cho	United States	41.726	Q
3	2	Semion Elistratov	Russia	42.982	
4	2	Sjinkie Knegt	Netherlands	44.448	
1	3	Kwak Yoon-gy	South Korea	42.147	Q
2	3	Pieter Gysel	Belgium	42.443	Q
3	3	Peter Darazs	Hungary	42.800	
4	3	Jordan Malone	United States	1:03.884	
1	4	Charles Hamelin	Canada	41.463	Q
2	4	Jon Eley	Great Britain	42.081	Q
3	4	Nicola Rodigari	Italy	42.190	
4	4	Ruslan Zakharov	Russia	43.207	
1	5	Thibaut Fauconnet	France	41.730	Q
2	5	Tyson Heung	Germany	41.835	Q
3	5	Blake Skjellerup	New Zealand	42.510	
–	5	Liang Wenhao	China		DSQ
1	6	François-Louis Tremblay	Canada	41.397	Q, OR
2	6	Haralds Silovs	Latvia	41.673	Q
3	6	Ma Yunfeng	China	41.954	
4	6	Yuri Confortola	Italy	1:17.401	
1	7	Apolo Ohno	United States	41.665	Q
2	7	Olivier Jean	Canada	41.737	Q
3	7	Paul Worth	Great Britain	42.936	
–	7	Aidar Bekzhanov	Kazakhstan		DSQ
1	8	Han Jialiang	China	41.869	Q
2	8	Jumpei Yoshizawa	Japan	42.158	Q
3	8	Robert Seifert	Germany	42.181	
4	8	Viktor Knoch	Hungary	42.197	

=== Quarterfinal ===
Rank	Heat	Name	Country	Time	Notes
1	1	Charles Hamelin	Canada	40.770	Q, OR
2	1	Sung Si-bak	South Korea	40.821	Q
3	1	Simon Cho	United States	41.211	
4	1	Niels Kerstholt	Netherlands	42.128	
1	2	Jon Eley	Great Britain	41.875	Q
2	2	Apolo Ohno	United States	42.004	Q
3	2	Tyson Heung	Germany	48.554	ADV
4	2	Thibaut Fauconnet	France	51.339	
1	3	Lee Ho-suk	South Korea	41.269	Q
2	3	Olivier Jean	Canada	41.275	Q
3	3	Han Jialiang	China	41.443	
4	3	Jumpei Yoshizawa	Japan	41.906	
1	4	François-Louis Tremblay	Canada	41.326	Q
2	4	Kwak Yoon-gy	South Korea	41.761	Q
3	4	Haralds Silovs	Latvia	41.837	
4	4	Pieter Gysel	Belgium	41.980	

=== Semifinal ===
Rank	Heat	Name	Country	Time	Notes
1	1	Charles Hamelin	Canada	40.964	QA
2	1	Sung Si-bak	South Korea	41.126	QA
3	1	Tyson Heung	Germany	41.455	QB
4	1	Jon Eley	Great Britain	41.504	QB
–	1	Olivier Jean	Canada		DSQ
1	2	Apolo Ohno	United States	41.460	QA
2	2	François-Louis Tremblay	Canada	41.515	QA
3	2	Kwak Yoon-gy	South Korea	41.620	QB
4	2	Lee Ho-suk	South Korea	1:24.514	QB

=== Finals ===
==== Final B (Classification Round) ====
Rank	Name	Country	Time	Notes
4	Kwak Yoon-gy	South Korea	42.123	
5	Tyson Heung	Germany	42.307	
6	Jon Eley	Great Britain	42.681	
7	Lee Ho-suk	South Korea	49.149	

==== Final A (Medal Round) ====
Rank	Name	Country	Time	Notes
1st place, gold medalist(s)	Charles Hamelin	Canada	40.981	
2nd place, silver medalist(s)	Sung Si-bak	South Korea	41.340	
3rd place, bronze medalist(s)	François-Louis Tremblay	Canada	46.366	
–	Apolo Ohno	United States		DSQ
