= Short-track speed skating at the 2010 Winter Olympics – Men's 1000 metres =

Men's 1000 metres at the XXI Olympic Winter Games
- Venue: Pacific Coliseum
- Dates: February 20, 2010
- Competitors: 32 from 18 nations
- Winning time: 1:23.747

Medalists
1st place, gold medalist(s)		Lee Jung-su	South Korea
2nd place, silver medalist(s)		Lee Ho-suk	South Korea
3rd place, bronze medalist(s)		Apolo Anton Ohno	United States

The men's 1000 metres in short track speed skating at the 2010 Winter Olympics began on February 17. The final was held on February 20 at the Pacific Coliseum.

== Results ==
=== Heats ===
Rank	Heat	Name	Country	Time	Notes
1	1	Charles Hamelin	Canada	1:25.256	Q
2	1	Sjinkie Knegt	Netherlands	1:25.449	Q
3	1	Jon Eley	Great Britain	1:25.588	
4	1	Ma Yunfeng	China	1:25.814	
1	2	François Hamelin	Canada	1:25.714	Q
2	2	Tyson Heung	Germany	1:25.938	Q
3	2	Viktor Knoch	Hungary	1:26.279	
4	2	Aidar Bekzhanov	Kazakhstan	1:26.536	
1	3	Sung Si-bak	South Korea	1:24.245	Q, OR
2	3	Blake Skjellerup	New Zealand	1:27.875	Q
3	3	Nicola Rodigari	Italy	1:41.117	ADV
–	3	Maxime Chataignier	France		DSQ
1	4	Han Jialiang	China	1:26.479	Q
2	4	Nicolas Bean	Italy	1:26.781	Q
3	4	Travis Jayner	United States	1:26.870	
4	4	Tom Iveson	Great Britain	1:27.841	
1	5	Yuri Confortola	Italy	1:27.073	Q
2	5	Thibaut Fauconnet	France	1:27.080	Q
3	5	Semion Elistratov	Russia	1:27.254	
4	5	Assen Pandov	Bulgaria	1:28.580	
1	6	Apolo Anton Ohno	United States	1:25.940	Q
2	6	Liang Wenhao	China	1:26.249	Q
3	6	Paul Herrmann	Germany	1:26.739	
4	6	Ruslan Zakharov	Russia	1:26.883	
1	7	Lee Jung-su	South Korea	1:24.962	Q
2	7	J. R. Celski	United States	1:25.113	Q
3	7	Pieter Gysel	Belgium	1:25.613	
4	7	Takahiro Fujimoto	Japan	1:26.359	
1	8	Lee Ho-suk	South Korea	1:25.925	Q
2	8	Haralds Silovs	Latvia	1:25.951	Q
3	8	Yuzo Takamido	Japan	1:26.074	
4	8	Lachlan Hay	Australia	1:26.132	

=== Quarterfinals ===
Rank	Heat	Name	Country	Time	Notes
1	1	Charles Hamelin	Canada	1:25.300	Q
2	1	Apolo Anton Ohno	United States	1:25.502	Q
3	1	Nicolas Bean	Italy	1:25.827	
4	1	Tyson Heung	Germany	1:26.098	
1	2	Lee Jung-su	South Korea	1:25.822	Q
2	2	Han Jialiang	China	1:25.856	Q
3	2	Sjinkie Knegt	Netherlands	1:26.176	
4	2	Thibaut Fauconnet	France	1:26.213	
–	2	Nicola Rodigari	Italy		DSQ
1	3	Sung Si-bak	South Korea	1:24.570	Q
2	3	J. R. Celski	United States	1:24.621	Q
3	3	Yuri Confortola	Italy	1:24.788	
4	3	Blake Skjellerup	New Zealand	1:27.374	
1	4	Lee Ho-Suk	South Korea	1:24.980	Q
2	4	François Hamelin	Canada	1:25.037	Q
3	4	Liang Wenhao	China	1:25.060	
4	4	Haralds Silovs	Latvia	1:50.292	

=== Semifinals ===
Rank	Heat	Name	Country	Time	Notes
1	1	Lee Ho-suk	South Korea	1:25.347	QA
2	1	Lee Jung-su	South Korea	1:25.560	QA
3	1	François Hamelin	Canada	1:45.324	ADV
–	1	J. R. Celski	United States		DSQ
1	2	Apolo Anton Ohno	United States	1:25.033	QA
2	2	Charles Hamelin	Canada	1:25.062	QA
3	2	Sung Si-bak	South Korea	1:25.068	QB
4	2	Han Jialiang	China	1:25.462	QB

=== Finals ===
==== Final B (Classification round) ====
Rank	Name	Country	Time	Notes
6	Han Jialiang	China	1:32.023	
–	Sung Si-bak	South Korea		DSQ

==== Final A (Medal round) ====
Rank	Name	Country	Time	Notes
1st place, gold medalist(s)	Lee Jung-su	South Korea	1:23.747	OR
2nd place, silver medalist(s)	Lee Ho-suk	South Korea	1:23.801	
3rd place, bronze medalist(s)	Apolo Anton Ohno	United States	1:24.128	
4	Charles Hamelin	Canada	1:24.329	
5	François Hamelin	Canada	1:25.206	
