= Short-track speed skating at the 2006 Winter Olympics – Men's 5000 metre relay =

Men's 5000 metre relay at the XX Olympic Winter Games
- Pictogram for short track
- Venue: Torino Palavela
- Dates: 15–25 February 2006
- Competitors: 35 from 8 nations

Medalists
1st place, gold medalist(s)		South Korea; Ahn Hyun-soo; Lee Ho-suk; Oh Se-jong; Seo Ho-jin; Song Suk-woo
2nd place, silver medalist(s)		Canada; Éric Bédard; Jonathan Guilmette; Charles Hamelin; François-Louis Tremblay; Mathieu Turcotte
3rd place, bronze medalist(s)		United States; Alex Izykowski; J.P. Kepka; Anthony Lobello; Apolo Anton Ohno; Rusty Smith

The men's 5000 metre relay in short track speed skating at the 2006 Winter Olympics began with the semifinals, on 15 February, and concluded with the final on 25 February, at the Torino Palavela.

== Records ==
Prior to this competition, the existing world and Olympic records were as follows:

World record	Canada	6:39.990	Beijing, China	13 March 2005
Olympic record	Canada	6:45.455	Salt Lake City, United States	13 February 2002

The following new world and Olympic records were set during this competition.

Date	Event	Team	Time	OR	WR
25 February	Final	South Korea; Ahn Hyun-soo; Lee Ho-suk; Seo Ho-jin; Song Suk-woo	6:43.376	OR	

== Results ==
=== Semifinals ===
The two semifinals, taking place on 15 February matched four teams, each with four skaters on the ice, with the top two in each advancing to the A final. One team, Italy qualified after being interfered with. The other teams advanced to the B Final.

Semifinal 1

Rank	Athlete	Result	Notes
1	Canada; Éric Bédard; Jonathan Guilmette; Charles Hamelin; François-Louis Tremblay	6:57.004	QA
2	South Korea; Ahn Hyun-soo; Lee Ho-suk; Oh Se-jong; Seo Ho-jin	7:01.783	QA
3	Germany; Thomas Bauer; Tyson Heung; Arian Nachbar; Sebastian Praus	7:02.367	QB
4	Australia; Lachlan Hay; Stephen Lee; Mark McNee; Elliot Shriane	7:03.356	QB

Semifinal 2

Rank	Athlete	Result	Notes
1	United States; Alex Izykowski; J.P. Kepka; Apolo Anton Ohno; Rusty Smith	6:55.082	QA
2	China; Li Haonan; Li Jiajun; Li Ye; Sui Baoku	6:55.476	QA
3	Italy; Fabio Carta; Yuri Confortola; Nicola Franceschina; Nicola Rodigari	7:07.358	ADV
–	Japan; Yoshiharu Arino; Takahiro Fujimoto; Takafumi Nishitani; Satoru Terao	DQ	

=== Finals ===
Two of the teams participating in Final A changed their teams between the semifinal and final rounds; Canada replaced Jonathan Guilmette with Mathieu Turcotte and South Korea replaced Oh Se-jong with Song Suk-woo.

Final A

Rank	Athlete	Result	Notes
1st place, gold medalist(s)	South Korea; Ahn Hyun-soo; Lee Ho-suk; Seo Ho-jin; Song Suk-woo	6:43.376	OR
2nd place, silver medalist(s)	Canada; Éric Bédard; Charles Hamelin; François-Louis Tremblay; Mathieu Turcotte	6:43.707	
3rd place, bronze medalist(s)	United States; Alex Izykowski; J.P. Kepka; Apolo Anton Ohno; Rusty Smith	6:47.990	
4	Italy; Fabio Carta; Yuri Confortola; Nicola Franceschina; Nicola Rodigari	6:48.597	
5	China; Li Haonan; Li Jiajun; Li Ye; Sui Baoku	6:53.989	

Final B

Rank	Athlete	Result	Notes
6	Australia; Lachlan Hay; Stephen Lee; Mark McNee; Elliot Shriane	7:01.666	
7	Germany; Thomas Bauer; Andre Hartwig; Arian Nachbar; Sebastian Praus	7:13.338	
