= 2010 European Short Track Speed Skating Championships =

- Venue: Dresden, Germany
- Dates: 22–24 January

The 2010 European Short Track Speed Skating Championships took place between 22 and 24 January 2010 in Dresden, Germany.

== Medal summary ==
=== Medal table ===
* Host nation (Germany)

Rank	Nation	Gold	Silver	Bronze	Total
1	Italy	6	1	1	8
2	Czech Republic	2	1	0	3
3	France	1	3	2	6
4	Germany*	1	1	0	2
5	Great Britain	0	2	2	4
6	Hungary	0	1	1	2
7	Russia	0	1	0	1
8	Netherlands	0	0	3	3
9	Bulgaria	0	0	1	1
Totals (9 entries)		10	10	10	30

=== Men's events ===
Event	Gold		Silver		Bronze	
500 metres	Maxime Chataignier (FRA)	46.841	Jon Eley (GBR)	46.957	Nicola Rodigari (ITA)	1:07.883
1000 metres	Nicola Rodigari (ITA)	1:27.815	Thibaut Fauconnet (FRA)	1:27.929	Niels Kerstholt (NED)	1:28.689
1500 metres	Nicola Rodigari (ITA)	2:15.682	Thibaut Fauconnet (FRA)	2:15.857	Niels Kerstholt (NED)	2:15.989
5000 metre relay	Italy; Yuri Confortola; Nicola Rodigari; Claudio Rinaldi; Nicolas Bean; Roberto Serra	6:45.195	Germany; Tyson Heung; Sebastian Praus; Paul Herrmann; Robert Seifert; Robert Becker	6:45.256	Great Britain; Jon Eley; Tom Iveson; Paul Worth; Anthony Douglas; Jack Whelbourne	6:47.691
Overall Classification	Nicola Rodigari (ITA)	102 pts.	Thibaut Fauconnet (FRA)	76 pts.	Maxime Chataignier (FRA)	42 pts.

=== Women's events ===
Event	Gold		Silver		Bronze	
500 metres	Arianna Fontana (ITA)	43.877	Kateřina Novotná (CZE)	43.945	Erika Huszár (HUN)	44.088
1000 metres	Kateřina Novotná (CZE)	1:33.897	Bernadett Heidum (HUN)	1:34.316	Véronique Pierron (FRA)	1:34.347
1500 metres	Arianna Fontana (ITA)	2:23.946	Elise Christie (GBR)	2:24.042	Evgenia Radanova (BUL)	2:24.120
3000 metre relay	Germany; Bianca Walter; Aika Klein; Christin Priebst; Julia Riedel	4:15.979	Russia; Nina Yevteyeva; Valeria Potemkina; Ekaterina Belova; Olga Belyakova	4:16.516	Netherlands; Liesbeth Mau-Asam; Maaike Vos; Sanne van Kerkhof; Annita van Doorn; Jorien ter Mors	4:18.263
Overall Classification	Kateřina Novotná (CZE)	89 pts.	Arianna Fontana (ITA)	86 pts.	Elise Christie (GBR)	42 pts.

== Participating nations ==
- Austria
- Belarus
- Belgium
- Bosnia and Herzegovina
- Bulgaria
- Croatia
- Czech Republic
- France
- Germany
- Great Britain
- Hungary
- Israel
- Italy
- Latvia
- Netherlands
- Poland
- Romania
- Russia
- Serbia
- Slovakia
- Slovenia
- Sweden
- Turkey
- Ukraine

== See also ==
- Short track speed skating
- European Short Track Speed Skating Championships
