= Short-track speed skating at the 2014 Winter Olympics – Men's 5000 metre relay =

Men's 5000 metre relay at the XXII Olympic Winter Games
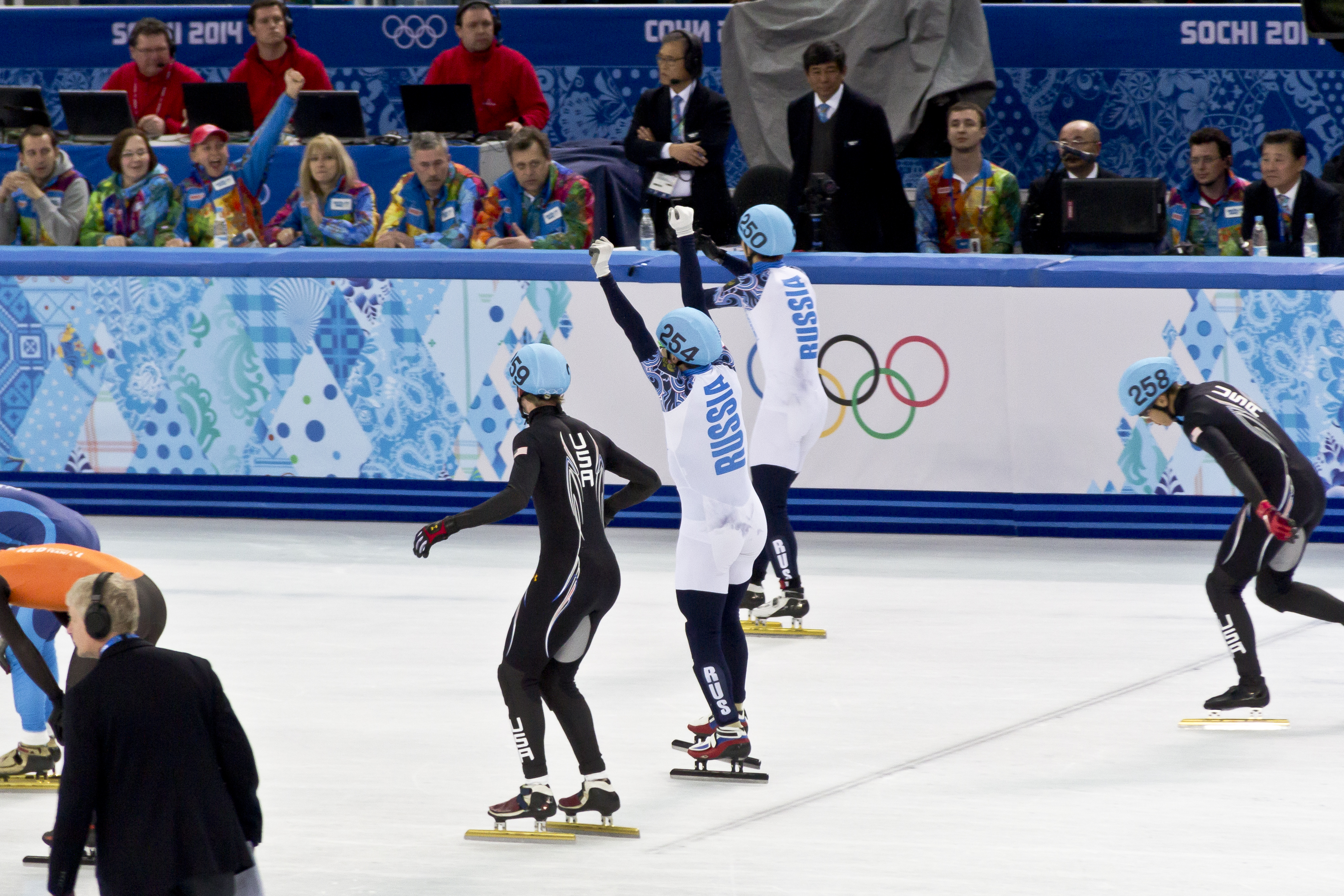
- Venue: Iceberg Skating Palace; Sochi, Russia
- Dates: 13 February 2014 (semifinal); 21 February 2014 (final)
- Competitors: 32 from 8 nations
- Winning time: 6:42.100

Medalists
1st place, gold medalist(s)		Viktor Ahn; Semion Elistratov; Vladimir Grigorev; Ruslan Zakharov	Russia
2nd place, silver medalist(s)		Eddy Alvarez; J. R. Celski; Chris Creveling; Jordan Malone	United States
3rd place, bronze medalist(s)		Chen Dequan; Han Tianyu; Shi Jingnan; Wu Dajing	China

The men's 5000 metre relay in short track speed skating at the 2014 Winter Olympics was held between 13–21 February 2014 at the Iceberg Skating Palace in Sochi, Russia.

The semifinal was held on 13 February with the final on 21 February.

The defending Olympic Champion and World Champion was Canada.

== Qualification ==
Countries were assigned quotas using a combination of the two special Olympic Qualification classifications that were held at two world cups in November 2013. For this event a total of 8 nations qualified to compete.

== Results ==
The final was held at 22:18.

=== Semifinals ===
QA – qualified for Final A
QB – qualified for Final B
ADV – advanced
PEN – penalty

Rank	Semifinal	Country	Athletes	Time	Notes
1	1	Netherlands	Daan Breeuwsma; Niels Kerstholt; Sjinkie Knegt; Freek van der Wart	6:45.385	QA
2	1	Kazakhstan	Abzal Azhgaliyev; Aidar Bekzhanov; Denis Nikisha; Nurbergen Zhumagaziyev	6:47.152	QA
3	1	South Korea	Lee Han-bin; Lee Ho-suk; Park Se-yeong; Sin Da-woon	6:48.206	QB
4	1	United States	Eddy Alvarez; J. R. Celski; Chris Creveling; Jordan Malone	6:50.292	ADV
1	2	Russia	Viktor Ahn; Semion Elistratov; Vladimir Grigorev; Ruslan Zakharov	6:44.331	QA
2	2	China	Chen Dequan; Han Tianyu; Shi Jingnan; Wu Dajing	6:44.521	QA
3	2	Italy	Yuri Confortola; Tommaso Dotti; Anthony Lobello; Nicola Rodigari	6:45.253	QB
4	2	Canada	Michael Gilday; Charles Hamelin; François Hamelin; Olivier Jean	6:48.186	QB

=== Finals ===
==== Final B (Classification Round) ====
Rank	Country	Athletes	Time
6	Canada	Michael Gilday; Charles Hamelin; Charle Cournoyer; Olivier Jean	6:43.747
7	South Korea	Kim Yun-jae; Lee Han-bin; Park Se-yeong; Sin Da-woon	6:43.921
8	Italy	Yuri Confortola; Tommaso Dotti; Anthony Lobello; Davide Viscardi	6:44.904

==== Final A (Medal Round) ====
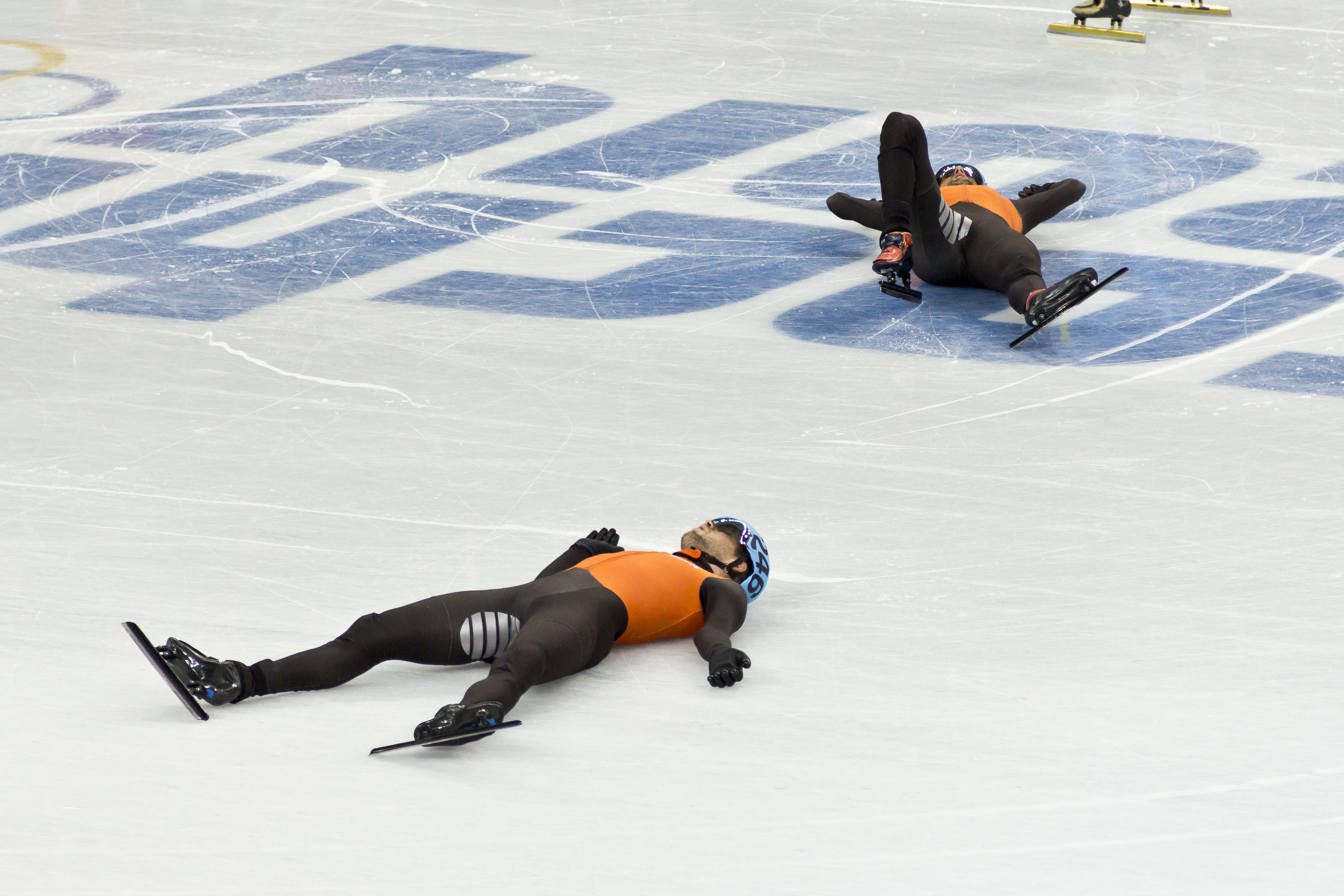
Dutch relay team after finishing fourth

Rank	Country	Athletes	Time	Notes
1st place, gold medalist(s)	Russia	Viktor Ahn; Semion Elistratov; Vladimir Grigorev; Ruslan Zakharov	6:42.100	OR
2nd place, silver medalist(s)	United States	Eddy Alvarez; J. R. Celski; Chris Creveling; Jordan Malone	6:42.371	
3rd place, bronze medalist(s)	China	Chen Dequan; Han Tianyu; Shi Jingnan; Wu Dajing	6:48.341	
4	Netherlands	Daan Breeuwsma; Niels Kerstholt; Sjinkie Knegt; Freek van der Wart	6:49.149	
5	Kazakhstan	Abzal Azhgaliyev; Aidar Bekzhanov; Denis Nikisha; Nurbergen Zhumagaziyev	6:54.630	
