= 2011 World Short Track Speed Skating Championships – Men's 5000 metre relay =

The Men's 5000 metre relay at the 2011 World Short Track Speed Skating Championships began on 12 March, and ended on 13 March at the Sheffield Arena.

The top eight teams from the World Cup season competed.

== Results ==
=== Semifinals ===
Top 2 Athletes from each heat qualified for the final.

Heat 1

Rank	Country	Athlete	Time	Notes
1	United States	Simon Cho; Travis Jayner; Anthony Lobello; Jeff Simon	6:56.274	Q
2	Canada	Michael Gilday; Charles Hamelin; Francois Hamelin; Olivier Jean	6:56.285	Q
3	United Kingdom	Jon Eley; Richard Shoebridge; Paul Stanley; Jack Whelbourne	7:07.931	
4	China	Wenhao Liang; Liu Xianwei; Song Weilong; Yang Jin	7:12.326	

Heat 2

Rank	Country	Athlete	Time	Notes
1	South Korea	Kim Byeong-jun; Kim Cheol-min; Lee Ho-suk; Noh Jin-kyu	7:00.889	Q
2	Germany	Robert Becker; Torsten Kroeger; Robert Seifert; Paul Herrmann	7:02.260	Q
3	Netherlands	Daan Breeuwsma; Niels Kerstholt; Sjinkie Knegt; Freek van der Wart	7:07.527	
4	France	Maxime Chataignier; Thibaut Fauconnet; Sebastien LePape; Jeremy Masson	7:19.283	

=== Final ===
Rank	Country	Athlete	Time	Notes
1st place, gold medalist(s)	Canada	Michael Gilday; Charles Hamelin; Francois Hamelin; Olivier Jean	6:52.731	
2nd place, silver medalist(s)	Germany	Robert Becker; Paul Herrmann; Christoph Milz; Robert Seifert	6:54.693	
3rd place, bronze medalist(s)	United States	Kyle Carr; Travis Jayner; Anthony Lobello; Jeff Simon	7:01.659	
–	South Korea	Kim Byeong-jun; Lee Ho-suk; Noh Jin-kyu; Um Cheon-ho		PEN
