= World and Olympic records set at the 2010 Winter Olympics =

A number of new Olympic and World records were set in various events at the 2010 Winter Olympics in Vancouver.

== Figure skating ==
The following new ISU best scores were set during this competition:

Event	Discipline	Skaters	Score	Date	Ref
Pairs	Short program	Shen Xue / Zhao Hongbo (CHN)	76.66	14 February 2010	
Pairs	Free skating	Pang Qing / Tong Jian (CHN)	141.81	15 February 2010	
Pairs	Total score	Shen Xue / Zhao Hongbo (CHN)	216.57	15 February 2010	
Ladies	Short program	Yuna Kim (KOR)	78.50	23 February 2010	
Ladies	Free skating	Yuna Kim (KOR)	150.06	25 February 2010	
Ladies	Total score	Yuna Kim (KOR)	228.56	25 February 2010	

== Short track speed skating ==
Event	Round	Time	Name	Nation	Date	Record	Ref
Men's 500 metres	Quarterfinal	40.770	Charles Hamelin	Canada	February 25	OR	
Men's 1000 metres	Heats	1:24.245	Sung Si-Bak	South Korea	February 17	OR	
Men's 1000 metres	Final A	1:23.747	Lee Jung-Su	South Korea	February 20	OR	
Men's 1500 metres	Semifinals	2:10.949	Lee Jung-Su	South Korea	February 13	OR	
Women's 500 metres	Heats	43.926	Wang Meng	China	February 13	OR	
Women's 500 metres	Quarterfinals	43.834	Katherine Reutter	United States	February	OR	
Women's 500 metres	Semifinals	42.985	Wang Meng	China	February 17	OR	
Women's 1000 meters	Heats	1:30.508	Katherine Reutter	United States	February 24	OR	
Women's 1000 meters	Quarterfinals	1:29.849	Zhou Yang	China	February	OR	
Women's 1000 meters	Semifinals	1:29.049	Zhou Yang	China	February 25	OR, WR	
Women's 1500 metres	Semifinals	2:20.859	Park Seung-Hi	South Korea	February 20	OR	
Women's 1500 metres	Final A	2:16.993	Zhou Yang	China	February 20	OR	
Women's 3000 metre relay	Semifinals	4:08.797	Sun Linlin; Wang Meng; Zhang Hui; Zhou Yang	China	February 24	OR	
Women's 3000 metre relay	Final A	4:06.610	Sun Linlin; Wang Meng; Zhang Hui; Zhou Yang	China	February 24	OR, WR	

OR = Olympic record, WR = World record

== Speed skating ==
Event	Date	Round	Name	Country	Time	Record
Men's 5000 metres	February 13	Pair 11	Sven Kramer	Netherlands	6:14.60	OR
Men's 10000 metres	February 23	Pair 5	Lee Seung-hoon	South Korea	12:58.55	OR
Men's team pursuit	February 26	Quarterfinal 1	Mathieu Giroux; Lucas Makowsky; Denny Morrison	Canada	3:42.38	OR, TR
Men's team pursuit	February 26	Semifinal 1	Mathieu Giroux; Lucas Makowsky; Denny Morrison	Canada	3:42.22	OR, TR
Men's team pursuit	February 27	Final B	Jan Blokhuijsen; Sven Kramer; Simon Kuipers	Netherlands	3:39.95	OR, TR

OR = Olympic record, TR = track record

== World records set by date ==
Date	Event	Athlete	Nation	Record description	Ref
24 February 2010	Short track speed skating – Women's 3000 metre relay	Sun Linlin; Wang Meng; Zhang Hui; Zhou Yang	China	Set a time of 4:06.610 in Final A (gold medal race)	
24 February 2010	Short track speed skating – Women's 1000 metres	Zhou Yang	China	Set a time of 1:29.049 in the semifinals	
