= J. R. Celski =

Short-track speed skater (born 1990)

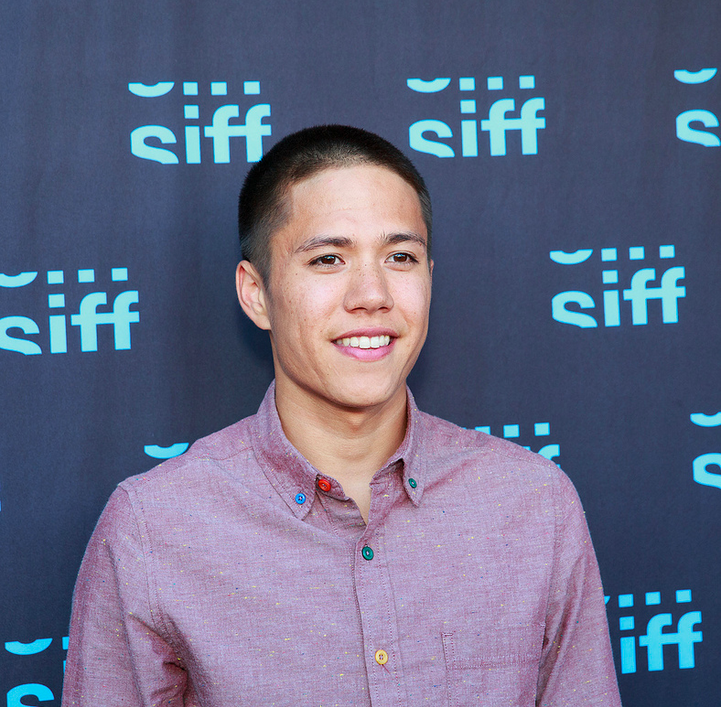
- Celski at the Seattle International Film Festival, May 2013

Personal information
- Born: John Robert Celski; July 17, 1990 (age 36) Monterey, California, U.S.
- Height: 5 ft 8 in (173 cm)
- Weight: 140 lb (64 kg)
- Website: www.jrcelski.com

Sport
- Country: United States
- Sport: Short track speed skating
- Club: U.S. National Racing Program

Achievements and titles
- Personal bests: 500m: 39.937 (2012, Former WR); 1000m: 1:23.087 (2013); 1500m: 2:10.937 (2017); 3000m: 4:41.948 (2009)
Medal record
Men's short track speed skating
Representing the United States
Olympic Games
Silver medal – second place	2014 Sochi	5000 m relay
Bronze medal – third place	2010 Vancouver	1500 m
Bronze medal – third place	2010 Vancouver	5000 m relay
World Championships
Gold medal – first place	2009 Vienna	3000 m
Gold medal – first place	2009 Vienna	5000 m relay
Gold medal – first place	2014 Montreal	3000 m
Silver medal – second place	2009 Vienna	Overall
Silver medal – second place	2010 Sofia	5000 m relay
Silver medal – second place	2014 Montreal	500 m
Silver medal – second place	2014 Montreal	Overall
Bronze medal – third place	2009 Vienna	1000 m
Bronze medal – third place	2009 Vienna	1500 m
Bronze medal – third place	2010 Sofia	1000 m
Bronze medal – third place	2010 Sofia	3000 m
World Team Championships
Bronze medal – third place	2009 Vienna	Team
World Junior Championships
Gold medal – first place	2009 Sherbrooke	500 m
Gold medal – first place	2009 Sherbrooke	5000 m relay
Bronze medal – third place	2006 Miercurea Ciuc	500 m
Bronze medal – third place	2009 Sherbrooke	Overall

John Robert Celski (/ˈsɛlski/, born July 17, 1990) is a retired American short track speed skater, three-time Olympian, and three-time medalist in the Winter Olympics. Celski has held a total of five combined Short Track World and Junior World Records throughout his career including the 500m and 5000m relay World Records as well as the 500m, 1000m and 3000m relay Junior World Records. Celski was a part of the team that broke and currently holds the World Record in the 5000m relay established in Shanghai, China on November 12, 2017.

On October 21, 2012, in Calgary, Canada, Celski became the first person to skate under the 40 second barrier in the 500m event with a time of 39.937 seconds. He held the World Record for this distance for over 5 years from October 2012 to February 2018.

At the 2010 Winter Olympics, Celski won bronze in the 1500 m and the 5000 m relay. Five months before the Olympics, Celski suffered a gruesome injury when he fell during a race and his right skate blade gashed his left thigh all the way to his femur bone and was uncertain if he would be able to skate again.

Celski's breakthrough performance was at the 2009 World Short Track Speed Skating Championships where he won five medals (two gold, one silver, two bronze). Overall, Celski has won three gold medals, four silver medals, and four bronze medals at the World Championships. He also has one bronze medal at the World Team Championships and four medals (two gold, two bronze) at the World Junior Championships.

== Career ==
=== 2009 World Junior Championships ===
In the 500 m, Celski won the final with a time of 41.462 breaking the previous Junior World Record. In the 1000 m semi-final, Celski broke the previous Junior World Record with a time of 1:25.304. Celski finished third overall with 58 points. Celski then combined with Eduardo Alvarez, Jonathan Sermeno, and Robert Lawrence in the 3000 m relay to finish first with a Junior World record time of 4:06.032.

=== 2009 World Championships ===
In the 1500 m, Celski placed third with a time of 2:14.974. In the 1000 m, Celski placed third with a time of 1:26.348. In his third event, the 3000 m, Celski won with a time of 4:48.444. Celski finished second overall with 65 points. Celski then combined with Ryan Bedford, Jordan Malone, and Apolo Ohno in the 5000 m relay to finish first with a time of 6:51.400.

=== 2010 Winter Olympics ===
==== Trials ====
The U.S. Short Track Speed Skating Olympic Trials were held September 8–12, 2009 in Marquette, Michigan. Celski finished second overall and was leading in points after the first two nights of the trials, but was injured during a crash in the semifinals of the 500 m race where his right skate sliced into his left leg; he did not skate in the second 1000 m races. His injury required emergency surgery, 60 stitches, and five months of rehabilitation with the help of Eric Heiden. Celski was unsure if he would ever compete again. During the 1000 m time trial, Celski won with a personal best of 1:23.981. Celski, along with Ohno, Jordan Malone, Travis Jayner and Simon Cho were the top five finishers at the trials. Afterwards, Ohno said about the nominated team: "This is the strongest team we've ever had. I feel really good about how we will do in the next Olympics".

==== Games ====
At the 2010 Winter Olympics in Vancouver, Celski won a pair of bronze medals. One in the 1500 m and another in the 5000 m relay. In the 1500 m final, Celski won the bronze medal after 2006 silver medalist Lee Ho-Suk crashed into fellow Korean skater Sung Si-Bak during the final turn of the last lap. Celski was in fifth place leading into the crash and as a result moved into third place. Apolo Ohno moved into second place. Celski was disqualified in the 1000 m semifinals. The 5000 m relay team for the United States finished with the bronze medal. The team, consisting of Apolo Ohno, Simon Cho, Travis Jayner, Jordan Malone and Celski, was in the fourth position for the majority of the race. With a strong push from Celski with two laps to go, Ohno as the anchor leg was able to pass the Chinese team for third place; Canada won the gold and South Korea took silver.

=== 2010 World Championships ===
Celski advanced to finals of the 1500 m after winning 1st place in the heats, quarterfinals, and semifinals. In the final, Celski finished in 4th place, in front of teammate Travis Jayner, who came in 6th. The next day, Celski competed in the 500 m. During the semifinals, Celski attempted a pass from fourth to third place, but during his pass, François-Louis Tremblay of Canada, in second place at the time, fell, tripping Celski on his way down. Celski finished the race in 3rd, but was then disqualified, while Tremblay advanced. In the 1000 m, Celski finished third behind Lee Ho-Suk and Kwak Yoon-Gy with a time of 1:27.515. In the 3000 m, Celski again placed third behind Lee Ho-Suk and Kwak Yoon-Gy. Celski finished fourth overall with 39 points. Celski then combined with Jordan Malone, Travis Jayner, and Simon Cho in the 5000 m relay to finish second behind South Korea with a time of 6:46.205.

=== 2014 Winter Olympics ===
At the 2014 Winter Olympics in Sochi, Celski competed and placed 4th in the Men's 1500m, 6th in the 500m, and 13th in the 1000m. Celski earned a silver medal in the short track men's 5000m relay.

=== 2018 Winter Olympics ===
At the 2018 Winter Olympics in Pyeongchang, South Korea, Celski competed in the 1500m, 1000m, and the men's 5000m relay.

== Media appearances ==
On February 9, 2010, Celski appeared on the TV show The Biggest Loser where he introduced a pop challenge to the contestants of the show. During the segment, Celski offered words of encouragement, and showed the contestants how to use a slide board.

On February 5, 2014, Celski was featured in a one-hour special on NBC television titled How to Raise an Olympian. The program, hosted by Meredith Vieira, chronicles the journeys of seven U.S. Olympians and features interviews from parents and coaches along with home video and photos from each athlete's childhood. The event was broadcast on television with live social media components to further each segment.

== Personal life ==
Celski was born in Monterey, California, where his father was serving in the U.S. Army. He was raised in Federal Way, Washington. His father, Robert, is of Polish descent and his mother, Sue, is of Filipino descent. Celski has two older brothers. Celski attended Lakewood High School in Lakewood, California, as well as Todd Beamer High School in Federal Way, Washington, graduating from Lakewood with high honors in the Merit Scholars Program. Before switching to speed skating after seeing the 2002 Winter Olympics, Celski was a national champion in-line skater. He missed the minimum age requirement for the 2006 Winter Olympics by 17 days. In September 2021, he was inducted into the National Polish-American Sports Hall of Fame in Troy, Michigan.
