= Short-track speed skating at the 2010 Winter Olympics – Men's 5000 metre relay =

Men's 5000 metre relay at the XXI Olympic Winter Games
- Pictogram for short track
- Venue: Pacific Coliseum
- Dates: February 17, 26, 2010
- Competitors: from 8 nations
- Teams: 8
- Winning time: 6:44.224

Medalists
1st place, gold medalist(s)		Charles Hamelin; François Hamelin; Olivier Jean; François-Louis Tremblay; Guillaume Bastille	Canada
2nd place, silver medalist(s)		Kwak Yoon-gy; Lee Ho-suk; Lee Jung-su; Sung Si-bak; Kim Seoung-il	South Korea
3rd place, bronze medalist(s)		J. R. Celski; Travis Jayner; Jordan Malone; Apolo Ohno; Simon Cho	United States

The men's 5000 metre relay in short track speed skating at the 2010 Winter Olympics began on 17 February, and ended on 26 February at the Pacific Coliseum.

== Results ==
=== Semifinals ===
Rank	Semifinal	Country	Athlete	Time	Notes
1	1	South Korea	Kim Seoung-il; Kwak Yoon-gy; Lee Ho-suk; Sung Si-bak	6:43.845	QA
2	1	United States	J. R. Celski; Simon Cho; Travis Jayner; Apolo Ohno	6:46.369	QA
3	1	France	Maxime Chataignier; Thibaut Fauconnet; Benjamin Macé; Jean Charles Mattei	6:51.071	ADV
–	1	Italy	Nicolas Bean; Yuri Confortola; Claudio Rinaldi; Nicola Rodigari		DSQ
1	2	China	Han Jialiang; Liu Xianwei; Ma Yunfeng; Song Weilong	6:43.601	QA
2	2	Canada	Guillaume Bastille; Charles Hamelin; Olivier Jean; François-Louis Tremblay	6:43.610	QA
3	2	Germany	Paul Herrmann; Tyson Heung; Sebastian Praus; Robert Seifert	6:47.289	QB
4	2	Great Britain	Anthony Douglas; Jon Eley; Tom Iveson; Jack Whelbourne	6:50.618	QB

=== Finals ===
==== Final B (classification round) ====
Rank	Country	Athletes	Time	Notes
6	Great Britain	Anthony Douglas; Jon Eley; Jack Whelbourne; Paul Worth	6:50.045	
7	Germany	Paul Herrmann; Tyson Heung; Sebastian Praus; Robert Seifert	6:50.119	

==== Final A (medal round) ====
Rank	Country	Athletes	Time	Notes
1st place, gold medalist(s)	Canada	Charles Hamelin; François Hamelin; Olivier Jean; François-Louis Tremblay	6:44.224	
2nd place, silver medalist(s)	South Korea	Kwak Yoon-gy; Lee Ho-suk; Lee Jung-su; Sung Si-bak	6:44.446	
3rd place, bronze medalist(s)	United States	J. R. Celski; Travis Jayner; Jordan Malone; Apolo Ohno	6:44.498	
4	China	Han Jialiang; Liu Xianwei; Ma Yunfeng; Song Weilong	6:44.630	
5	France	Maxime Chataignier; Thibaut Fauconnet; Jeremy Masson; Jean Charles Mattei	6:51.566	
