= Travis Jayner =

Short track speed skater

Personal information
- Born: May 9, 1982 (age 44) Riverview, New Brunswick, Canada
- Height: 1.85 m (6 ft 1 in)
- Weight: 74.8 kg (165 lb; 11.78 st)

Sport
- Country: United States
- Sport: Speed skating
- Club: APTE
Medal record
Men's short track speed skating
Representing the United States
Winter Olympics
Bronze medal – third place	2010 Vancouver	5000 m relay
World Championships
Silver medal – second place	2010 Sofia	5000 m relay
Bronze medal – third place	2007 Milan	5000 m relay
Bronze medal – third place	2011 Sheffield	5000 m relay
World Team Championships
Bronze medal – third place	2009 Heerenveen	overall
World Cup
Gold medal – first place	2008 Vancouver	5000 m relay
Silver medal – second place	2009 Marquette	5000 m relay
Silver medal – second place	2010 Montreal	1500 m 2
Silver medal – second place	2010 Quebec	1000 m 2
Silver medal – second place	2010 Quebec	5000 m relay
Silver medal – second place	2010 Changchun	5000 m relay
Silver medal – second place	2011 Moscow	1500 m
Bronze medal – third place	2007 Saguenay	5000 m relay
Bronze medal – third place	2009 Montreal	1500 m
Bronze medal – third place	2010 Montreal	1000 m
Bronze medal – third place	2010 Montreal	5000 m relay
Bronze medal – third place	2011 Moscow	1000 m 2

Travis Jayner (born May 9, 1982 in Riverview, New Brunswick) is a Canadian-born American short track speed skater who is a member of the US Olympic Team for the 2010 Winter Olympics in Vancouver, British Columbia. He earned a bronze medal in the 5000-meter relay with teammates Apolo Ohno, J.R. Celski, Jordan Malone and Simon Cho.

He is currently the Short Track Speedskating Elite Athlete Representative for the US Speedskating Board of Directors.

== Early life ==
Jayner's father, Jack Jayner, was a U.S. and North American short track champion in high school, and Canadian short track champion 11 years later, early in his business career as an architect. In 1975, he founded a speed skating club in Moncton, New Brunswick, Canada, and introduced Travis and his brother Alex to the sport when they were five years old.

Born to unilingual English-speaking parents, Jayner successfully completed the Early Total French Immersion Option of Frank L. Bowser Elementary School in Riverview, New Brunswick – in which only French is spoken in Grades 1, 2, and 3. He cultivated this grounding with speed skaters from Quebec whom he met regularly at youth-age competitions, training camps, and sport summer schools, both in Quebec and New Brunswick cities, achieving fluency in French by the end of high school.

He participated in many sports including volleyball, soccer, cross country running, high-jumping and ball hockey (as goaltender) – earning high school letters while maintaining academic honors.

Jayner graduated in 2000 from Riverview High School. Accepted by both McGill and Concordia Universities, he promptly moved to Montreal and took an apartment off-campus (with Quebec skater Olivier Jean) to be near the National Training Center in the Maurice Richard Arena. They were coached by Dany Lemay and Yves Hamelin. Off-season they inline road-raced often – including the 24-hour team event on the city's Formula One high performance auto track.

During these years Jayner's academics focused on engineering and urban studies while, as a skater, he moved up the ranks, participating in several CanAm competitions. As a result of contacts established at these cross-border invitational meets, Jayner played host to Ryan Bedford (of Michigan) and Jordan Malone (of Texas) in Montreal – showing them around town, introducing them to the local short track skating scene and advising them on dealing with the French language – during times when they sought diverse independence in their training programs and experience.

At the 2003 Canada Winter Games in Bathurst/Campbellton, Jayner represented his home province of New Brunswick, winning a silver medal in the men's short track 3000m.

In 2004, circumstances resulted in Jayner's move to Midland, Michigan – where Ryan Bedford and his family returned hosting favors. Jayner subsequently skated and dryland-trained in the summer in Marquette, Michigan, with Shani Davis – who was active in both short track and long track pursuits at that time. That fall, Jayner accepted an invitation to train at the USA National Center in Colorado Springs, Colorado – in a program directed by Derek Campbell.

== Professional career ==
In September 2005, Jayner qualified for his first World Cup Team – a tour of 4 competitions – the final two being Olympic Qualifier events – determining the Nation Quotas for the 2006 Olympic Games in Torino, Italy. The USA qualified a maximum Olympic squad.

== See also ==
- List of people from Riverview, New Brunswick
