= Park Jin-hwan =

South Korean short-track speedskater

Personal information
- Born: July 15, 1987 (age 38)

Sport
- Country: Korea
- Sport: Speed skating
- Club: Dankook University
Medal record
Men's short track speed skating
Representing Korea
World Team Championships
Gold medal – first place	2009 Heerenveen	Team

Park Jin-hwan (born 15 July 1987) is a former South Korean short-track speedskater. He is the 2009 World Team champion. During the 2008–09 World Cup season, he achieved one relay victory, another two relay podiums as well as one personal podium.

He participated in the 2009 World Championships in Vienna, Austria. In the men's relay, Korean team finished just 6th.

== World Cup podiums ==
Season	Location	Rank	Event
2008–09	(United States) Salt Lake City	1st place, gold medalist(s)	5000m relay
2008–09	(China) Beijing	3rd place, bronze medalist(s)	1500m
2008–09	(Japan) Nagano	2nd place, silver medalist(s)	5000m relay
2008–09	(Germany) Dresden	2nd place, silver medalist(s)	5000m relay
