= Valeriya Reznik =

Russian speed skater

Personal information
- Born: Valeriya Potemkina; June 15, 1985 (age 41) Moscow, Soviet Union
- Height: 5 ft 5 in (165 cm)
- Weight: 110 lb (50 kg)

Sport
- Country: Russia
- Sport: Short track speed skating

Achievements and titles
- Highest world ranking: 13 (1500m)

Valeriya Reznik (born Valeriya Potemkina, June 15, 1985 in Moscow) is a Russian short track speed skater.

Reznik competed at the 2010 Winter Olympics for Russia. She finished fourth in the first round of both the 500 and 1000 metres, and fifth in the first round of the 1500 metres, failing to advance in each event. Her best overall finish came in the 500, where she placed 25th.

As of 2013, Reznik's best finish at the World Championships is 7th, on three occasions as part of the Russian 3000 metre relay team. Her best individual performance at a World Championships came in 2010, when she placed 8th in the 1500 metres. She has also won a silver medal as a member of the Russian relay team at the 2010 European Championships.

As of 2013, Reznik has two ISU Short Track Speed Skating World Cup podium finishes, both of which came as a member of the Russian relay team. Her best finish is a silver medal, at Heerenveen in 2006–07. Her top World Cup ranking is 13th, in the 1500 metres in 2006–07.

== World Cup podiums ==
| Date | Season | Location | Rank | Event |
| 4 February 2007 | 2006–07 | Heerenveen | 2nd place, silver medalist(s) | 3000m Relay |
| 25 November 2007 | 2007–08 | Hangzhou | 3rd place, bronze medalist(s) | 3000m Relay |
