= Takahiro Fujimoto (speed skater) =

Japanese speed skater

Personal information
- Born: March 13, 1985 (age 41) Nishigoshi, Japan
- Height: 5 ft 7 in (170 cm)
- Weight: 139 lb (63 kg)

Sport
- Country: Japan
- Sport: Short track speed skating

Achievements and titles
- World finals: 1
- Highest world ranking: 30 (1500m)
Medal record
Men's short track speed skating
Representing Japan
World Championships
Bronze medal – third place	2009 Vienna	5000 m relay

Takahiro Fujimoto (藤本 貴大, Fujimoto Takahiro; born March 13, 1985 in Nishigoshi) is a Japanese short track speed skater.

Fujimoto competed at the 2006 and 2010 Winter Olympics for Japan. In 2006, he was a member of the 5000 metre relay team, which was disqualified in the semifinal. In 2010, in both the 500 metres and 1000 metres, he placed fourth in his heat, failing to advance. In the 1500 metres, he placed 3rd in his opening heat, advancing to the semifinals, where he finished 6th, again failing to advance. His best overall finish was in the 1500, where he placed 17th.

As of 2013, Fujimoto's best performance at the World Championships came in 2009, when he won a bronze medal as a member of the Japanese 5000 metre relay team. His best individual finish is 11th, in the 2009 1000 metres

As of 2013, Fujimoto has two podium finishes on the ISU Short Track Speed Skating World Cup. His best finish is a silver, in the 500 metres at Jeonju in 2006–07. His top World Cup ranking is 13th, in the 1000 metres in 2008–09.

== World Cup Podiums ==
Date	Season	Location	Rank	Event
29 October 2006	2006–07	Jeonju	2nd place, silver medalist(s)	500m
25 November 2007	2007–08	Heerenveen	3rd place, bronze medalist(s)	5000m Relay
