= Lachlan Hay =

Australian speed skater (born 1986)

Personal information
- Born: 25 May 1986 (age 40) Baulkham Hills, Australia
- Height: 5 ft 10 in (178 cm)
- Weight: 157 lb (71 kg)

Sport
- Country: Australia
- Sport: Short track speed skating

Achievements and titles
- Highest world ranking: 20 (1500m)

Lachlan Hay (born 25 May 1986 in Baulkham Hills) is an Australian short-track speed-skater.

Hay competed at the 2006 and 2010 Winter Olympics for Australia. In 2006, he was a member of the Australian 5000 metre relay team, which placed fourth in the semifinal, then won the B final to end up 6th overall. In 2010, he finished 4th in the opening round of the 1000 metres, failing to advance. His overall finish in the 1000 was 26th.

As of 2013, Hay's best performance at the World Championships came in 2007, when he placed 7th as part of the Australian 5000 metre relay team. His best individual finish is 13th, in the 2012 1500 metres.

As of 2013, Hay has not finished on the podium on the ISU Short Track Speed Skating World Cup. His top World Cup ranking is 20th, in the 1500 metres in 2006–07.
