= Denis Bellotti =

Italian speed skater

Personal information
- Nationality: Italian
- Born: 7 May 1986 (age 40) Sondalo, Italy

Sport
- Sport: Short track speed skating
Medal record
Men's short track speed skating
Representing Italy
European Championships
Bronze medal – third place	2007 Sheffield	1000 m
Winter Universiade
Bronze medal – third place	2007 Turin	5000 m relay
World Junior Championships
Silver medal – second place	2004 Beijing	5000 m relay

Denis Bellotti (born 7 May 1986) is a former Italian short track speed skater. He is bronze medallist of the 2007 European Championships. He represented Italy at the home 2007 Winter Universiade where he won a bronze medal in the relay competition. He briefly competed at the World Cup, achieving one personal podium and one relay victory during the 2006–07 season.
