= Rémi Beaulieu-Tinker =

Canadian short track speed skater

Personal information
- Born: February 20, 1985 (age 41) Sherbrooke, Quebec, Canada

Sport
- Country: Canada

Rémi Beaulieu-Tinker (born February 20, 1985 in Sherbrooke, Quebec, Canada) is a former Canadian short track speed skater.

Beaulieu-Tinker participated at multiple World Cup competitions between 2008 and 2012. He achieved three personal podiums as well as three victories and another six podiums in relay competitions. His best personal finish was second in 500m in Changchun during the 2010–11 season. He was last active in August 2013 when he tried to be selected for the Canadian national team but he did not manage to do that.

He studied at the University of Quebec in Montreal. After finishing his sporting career he was active as a researcher in a project of the Department of Kinanthropology of the University of Quebec in Montreal.

== World Cup podiums ==
Season	Location	Rank	Event
2008–09	(United States) Salt Lake City	3rd place, bronze medalist(s)	5000m relay
2008–09	(Canada) Vancouver	2nd place, silver medalist(s)	5000m relay
2008–09	(Canada) Vancouver	3rd place, bronze medalist(s)	1000m
2008–09	(Germany) Dresden	3rd place, bronze medalist(s)	1500m
2010–11	(Canada) Montreal	1st place, gold medalist(s)	5000m relay
2010–11	(China) Changchun	1st place, gold medalist(s)	5000m relay
2010–11	(China) Changchun	2nd place, silver medalist(s)	500m
2010–11	(Russia) Moscow	2nd place, silver medalist(s)	5000m relay
2010–11	(Germany) Dresden	3rd place, bronze medalist(s)	5000m relay
2011–12	(China) Shanghai	2nd place, silver medalist(s)	5000m relay
2011–12	(Russia) Moscow	1st place, gold medalist(s)	5000m relay
2011–12	(Netherlands) Dordrecht	2nd place, silver medalist(s)	5000m relay
