= Paul Herrmann =

German speed skater

Personal information
- Born: November 16, 1985 (age 40) Dresden, East Germany
- Height: 5 ft 8 in (173 cm)
- Weight: 148 lb (67 kg)

Sport
- Country: Germany
- Sport: Short track speed skating

Achievements and titles
- World finals: 3
- Highest world ranking: 11 (1500m)
Medal record
Men's short track speed skating
Representing Germany
World Championships
Silver medal – second place	2011 Sheffield	5000 m relay
Bronze medal – third place	2010 Sofia	5000 m relay

Paul Herrmann (born November 16, 1985, in Dresden) is a German short-track speed-skater.

Herrmann competed at the 2010 Winter Olympics for Germany. In the 1000 metres he placed third in his opening heat, and in the 1500 metres, he placed sixth in the opening round, both timesfailing to advance. As a member of the German 5000 metre relay team, he finished 3rd in the semifinal and 2nd in the B Final, ending up 5th overall. His best individual performance was in the 1000 metres, where he finished 22nd overall.

As of 2013, Herrmann's best performance at the World Championships came in 2011, when he won a silver medal as a member of the German 5000m relay team. His best individual performance at a World Championships was also in 2011, placing 12th in the 500 metres. He also won a gold medal as a member of the German relay team at the 2007 European Championships.

As of 2013, Herrmann has one ISU Short Track Speed Skating World Cup victory, one as part of the relay team in 2010-2011 at Dresden, and four other podium finishes, also all in relay races. His top World Cup ranking is 11th, in the 1500 metres in 2006–07.

== World Cup podiums ==
Date	Season	Location	Rank	Event
10 December 2006	2006–07	Montreal	3rd place, bronze medalist(s)	5000m Relay
4 February 2007	2006–07	Heerenveen	2nd place, silver medalist(s)	5000m Relay
8 February 2009	2008–09	Sofia	3rd place, bronze medalist(s)	5000m Relay
15 February 2009	2008–09	Dresden	3rd place, bronze medalist(s)	5000m Relay
20 February 2011	2011–12	Dresden	1st place, gold medalist(s)	5000m Relay
