= Meng Xiaoxue =

Chinese speed skater

Personal information
- Born: March 4, 1985 (age 41)

Sport
- Country: China
- Sport: Short track speed skating

Achievements and titles
- Personal best: 500m: 44.042 (2009)
Medal record
Women's short track speed skating
Representing China
World Championships
| Silver medal – second place | 2007 Milan | 3000m relay |
| Bronze medal – third place | 2008 Gangneung | 3000m relay |
World Team Championships
| Bronze medal – third place | 2007 Budapest | Team |
Winter Universiade
| Gold medal – first place | 2007 Turin | 3000m relay |
| Gold medal – first place | 2009 Harbin | 3000m relay |
| Bronze medal – third place | 2007 Turin | 1500m |
| Bronze medal – third place | 2009 Harbin | 500m |

Meng Xiaoxue (Chinese: 孟晓雪, born 4 March 1985) is a retired Chinese female short track speed skater.

She was twice World Championships bronze medalist in relay competitions. Her best personal achievement was third place in a 500 m race during the 2008-09 World Cup. At the World Cup events, she had also three victories as well as one second place in relay competitions.
