= Ma Yunfeng =

Chinese speed skater

Ma Yunfeng (Chinese: 马云峰; born October 17, 1983, in Harbin) is a Chinese male short track speed skater. He competed at the 2010 Winter Olympics in the 500m, 1000m, and 5000m relay events.
