= Olga Belyakova =

Russian short track speed skater (born 1988)

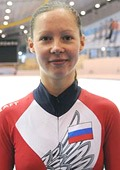

Personal information
- Born: 26 September 1988 (age 37) Rybinsk, Soviet Union
- Height: 5 ft 9 in (175 cm)
- Weight: 130 lb (59 kg)

Sport
- Country: Russia
- Sport: Short track speed skating

Achievements and titles
- World finals: 1
- Highest world ranking: 8 (1500m)

Olga Vladimirovna Belyakova (Russian: Ольга Владимировна Белякова; born 26 September 1988 in Rybinsk) is a Russian short-track speed-skater.

Belyakova competed at the 2010 Winter Olympics for Russia. She finished sixth in the first round of the 1500 metres, failing to advance, and ending up 30th overall.

As of 2013, Belyakova's best finish at the World Championships is fourth, in the 1500 metres in 2012. She has also won a silver medal as a member of the Russian relay team at the 2010 European Championships.

As of 2013, Belyakova has two ISU Short Track Speed Skating World Cup podium finishes, both of which came as a member of the Russian relay team. Her best finish is a silver medal, at Heerenveen in 2006–07. Her top World Cup ranking is 13th, in the 1500 metres in 2006–07.

== World Cup podiums ==
Date	Season	Location	Rank	Event
4 February 2007	2006–07	Heerenveen	2nd place, silver medalist(s)	3000m Relay
23 October 2011	2011–12	Salt Lake City	3rd place, bronze medalist(s)	3000m Relay
