= Gábor Galambos =

Hungarian speed skater (born 1988)

Personal information
- Born: 31 December 1988 (age 37) Budapest, Hungary

Sport
- Country: Hungary
- Sport: Short track speed skating
Medal record
European Championships
Silver medal – second place	2007 Sheffield	5000 m relay
Bronze medal – third place	2007 Sheffield	500 m
Bronze medal – third place	2008 Ventspils	1000 m
Bronze medal – third place	2009 Turin	5000 m relay
European Youth Olympic Winter Festival
Gold medal – first place	2005 Monthey	1500 m
Bronze medal – third place	2005 Monthey	1000 m

Gábor Galambos (born 31 December 1988) is a Hungarian retired short track speed skater. He won four European Championships medals in the sport.
