= 2007 World Short Track Speed Skating Team Championships =

Short track team championship

- Location: Budapest, Hungary
- Start date: 17 March 2007
- End date: 18 March 2007
- Competitors: 80 from 11 nations

The 2007 World Short Track Speed Skating Team Championships was the 17th edition of the World Short Track Speed Skating Team Championships, which took place on 17–18 March 2007 in Budapest, Hungary.

Teams were divided into two brackets of four: the best team from each bracket qualified directly for the Final A, while the two next teams entered the repechage round and the last was eliminated for the Final B. The best two teams in the repechage round qualified for the Final B, while the last two entered the Final B. Each team was represented by four athletes at both 500 m and 1000 m as well as by two athletes at 3000 m. There were four heats at both 500 m and 1000 m, whereby each heat consisted of athletes representing different countries. There was one heat at 3000 m.

== Medal winners ==
Event	Gold	Silver	Bronze
Men	Canada; François-Louis Tremblay; Jean-François Monette; Charles Hamelin; Olivier Jean; Marc-André Monette	Korea; Ahn Hyun-soo; Kim Hyun-kon; Song Kyung-taek; Sung Si-bak; Kim Byeong-jun	Italy; Yuri Confortola; Marco Bertoldi; Fabio Carta; Nicola Rodigari; Roberto Serra
Women	Korea; Kim Min-jung; Byun Chun-sa; Jin Sun-yu; Jung Eun-ju; Jeon Ji-soo	China; Fu Tianyu; Zhu Mi Lei; Cheng Xiaolei; Zhou Yang; Meng Xiaoxue	Canada; Anne Maltais; Annik Plamondon; Kalyna Roberge; Nita Avrith; Amanda Overland

== Results ==
=== Men ===
Rank	Nation	Total
1st place, gold medalist(s)	Canada	43
2nd place, silver medalist(s)	Korea	33
3rd place, bronze medalist(s)	Italy	26
4	United States	18
5	Hungary	FB
6	Germany	FB
7	Australia	FB
8	Ukraine	FB

=== Women ===
Rank	Nation	Total
1st place, gold medalist(s)	Korea	56
2nd place, silver medalist(s)	China	28
3rd place, bronze medalist(s)	Canada	23
4	United States	13
5	Japan	FB
6	Hungary	FB
7	Russia	FB
8	Italy	DNS FB
