= Cheng Xiaolei =

Chinese speed skater

Personal information
- Nationality: Chinese
- Born: 17 April 1981 (age 45) Jilin, China

Sport
- Sport: Short track speed skating
Medal record
Women's short track speed skating
Representing China
World Championships
Gold medal – first place	2006 Minneapolis	3000 m relay
Silver medal – second place	2004 Gothenburg	3000 m relay
Silver medal – second place	2005 Beijing	3000 m relay
Silver medal – second place	2007 Milan	3000 m relay
World Team Championships
Silver medal – second place	2004 St. Petersburg	Team
Silver medal – second place	2005 Chuncheon	Team
Silver medal – second place	2006 Montreal	Team
Silver medal – second place	2007 Budapest	Team

Cheng Xiaolei (born 17 April 1981) is a Chinese short track speed skater. She competed in two events at the 2006 Winter Olympics.
