= Lee Jung-su =

South Korean short track speed skater

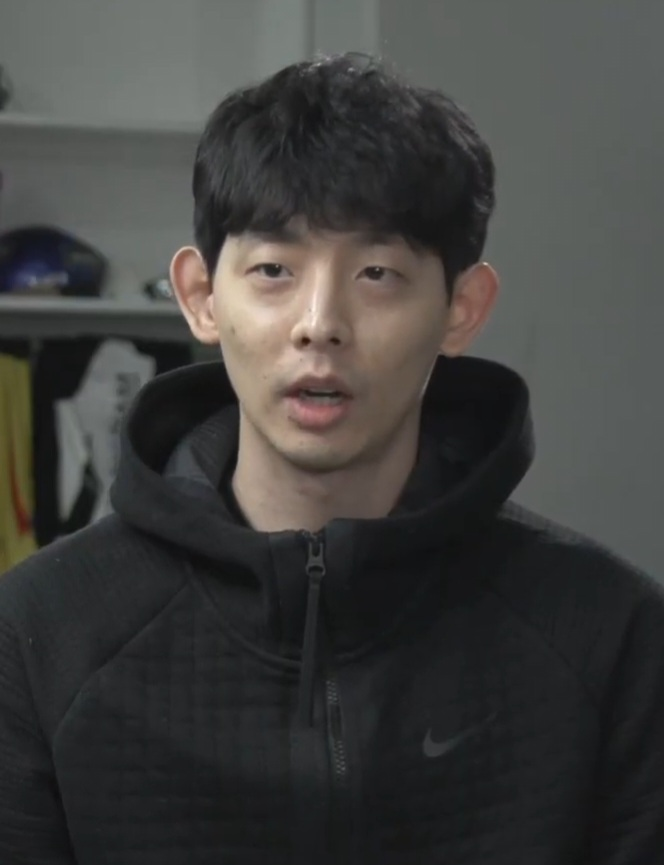

Personal information
- Born: November 30, 1989 (age 36) Seoul, South Korea
- Height: 173 cm (5 ft 8 in)
- Weight: 60 kg (132 lb)

Sport
- Country: South Korea
- Sport: Short track speed skating
Medal record
Event	1st	2nd	3rd
Olympic Games	2	1	0
World Championships	1	0	2
World Team Championships	2	0	0
World Junior Championships	5	6	0
Asian Games	0	1	1
Total	10	8	3
Men's short track speed skating
Representing South Korea
Olympic Games
Gold medal – first place	2010 Vancouver	1000 m
Gold medal – first place	2010 Vancouver	1500 m
Silver medal – second place	2010 Vancouver	5000 m relay
World Championships
Gold medal – first place	2010 Sofia	5000 m relay
Bronze medal – third place	2012 Shanghai	5000 m relay
Bronze medal – third place	2025 Beijing	5000 m relay
World Team Championships
Gold medal – first place	2009 Heerenveen	Team
Gold medal – first place	2010 Bormio	Team
World Junior Championships
Gold medal – first place	2006 Miercurea-Ciuc	Overall
Gold medal – first place	2006 Miercurea-Ciuc	1500m S.F
Gold medal – first place	2007 Mladá Boleslav	1500m
Gold medal – first place	2007 Mladá Boleslav	1500m S.F
Gold medal – first place	2008 Bolzano	500m
Silver medal – second place	2006 Miercurea-Ciuc	1000m
Silver medal – second place	2006 Miercurea-Ciuc	1500m
Silver medal – second place	2007 Mladá Boleslav	Overall
Silver medal – second place	2008 Bolzano	Overall
Silver medal – second place	2008 Bolzano	1500m
Silver medal – second place	2008 Bolzano	1500m S.F
Asian Winter Games
Silver medal – second place	2017 Sapporo	5000 m relay
Bronze medal – third place	2017 Sapporo	1500 m

- Lee Jung-su
- Hangul: 이정수
- Hanja: 李政洙
- RR: I Jeongsu
- MR: I Chŏngsu

Lee Jung-su (Korean: 이정수; Korean pronunciation: [i.dʑʌŋ.su]; born November 30, 1989) is a South Korean short track speed skater. He is a two-time Olympic Champion from 2010 Winter Olympics.

Lee won one distances and became second overall at the 2008 World Junior Championships in Bolzano. He won 2009–2010 Overall World Cup. At the 2010 Olympic Winter Games in Vancouver, Lee won two gold medal in the 1000m and 1500m events.

== Early life and education ==
Lee was born in 1989 as the 25th generation of the Injegong branch in the Hansan Lee clan. Lee's father, Lee Do-won is a department manager at the Kyunghyang Sinmun newspaper. Lee's family members are devoted Buddhists. Lee started skating as a hobby in 2002 when he was in fourth grade at Seongok Elementary School. The school in the neighborhood of Wolgye-dong, Nowon-gu, Seoul is located next to the ice rink at Kwangwoon University. Lee's older sister, Lee Hwa-yeong was a figure skater regarded as a rising rookie, who won an elementary competition at the Korean National Sports Festival when she was in 6th grade. During the time, Lee's coach recommended Lee to be a professional skater. As Lee's school established a skating team, Lee joined it. Two years later, he switched from long track speed skating to short track speed skating.

On the other hand, Lee's parents had financial difficulties in supporting their children's dream. They had to spend over 2,000,000 won (approximately US$1,736) per month for the fees of skating lessons, purchasing skating tools and renting exercising locations. Although Lee's parents worked together, spent all savings and even sold paddy fields in a countryside to support their children, that was not enough to cover all. They finally had to loan mortgages on their house where the family was living. However, Lee's sister eventually gave up due to the financial situation and tried to seek her future in other sport genres that cost less money for training such as inline skating and wakeboarding. The fact that his sister had to drop her dream has stimulated Lee Jung-Su to focus on the skating training.

Lee graduated from Gwangmun High School, and Dankook University.

== Career ==
Lee joined the South Korean national team in 2008. Lee won the short track World Cup in the 2009–2010 season, and got gold in the 1000m and 1500m at the 2010 Vancouver Olympics, and another silver in the 5000m relay.

Lee has been handed a 3-year ban along with his teammate Kwak Yoon-Gy for controversial foulplay. Lee had written a note stating that he was not fit to compete in the World Championships 2010 Sofia, because of an injury. This turned out to be not true, and Lee admitted that his coach forced him to pull out so that he could give teammate Kwak Yoon-Gy a chance to win a medal. Kwak Yoon-gy went on to win Gold in the 1500m.

On May 19, 2010, the Korea Skating Union and the Korean Sport & Olympic Committee reduced the ban on Lee Jung-soo and Kwak Yoon-gy from three years to one year. Through an appeal, it was reduced to six months again on July 20, 2010. But Kwak's coach Jeon Jae-Mok was given a life ban. and 2010 Vancouver Olympic head coach Kim Ki-hoon, who participated in the match-fixing, was suspended for three years, and coaches Song Jae-kun and Choi Kwang-bok were also suspended for one year.

Lee joined the national team again in the 2011–2012 season and won the bronze medal in the 5000m relay at the World Championships.

At the 2017 Sapporo Asian Games, he won the bronze medal in the 1500m and the silver medal in the 5000m relay.

Lee served as a KBS commentator at the 2018 Pyeongchang Olympics and the 2022 Beijing Olympics.

== Switching disclplines ==
After failing to gain selection for the Korean short track team ahead of the 2014 Olympic Winter Games in Sochi, he switched to speed skating in an attempt to qualify for the event. He did not finish high enough at the Olympic trials, and in April 2014 he announced he would be returning to short track. He made the same switch in August 2017 to try and gain selection for the national speed skating team ahead of the 2018 Olympic Winter Games. His focus was specifically the mass start event

== Career highlights ==
ISU World Junior Short Track Speed Skating Championships
2008 – Bolzano, (silver) 2nd overall classification

1st at 500m

Winter Olympic Games
2010 – Vancouver, (gold) Gold at 1000m and 1500m

== See also ==
- South Korea at the 2010 Winter Olympics
- List of 2010 Winter Olympics medal winners
