= 2010 World Short Track Speed Skating Championships =

The 2010 World Short Track Speed Skating Championships took place between 19 and 21 March 2010 in Sofia, Bulgaria. The World Championships are organised by the ISU which also run world cups and championships in speed skating and figure skating.

== Results ==
=== Men ===
Event	Gold		Silver		Bronze	
Overall*	Lee Ho-suk; South Korea	86 points	Kwak Yoon-gy; South Korea	76 points	Liang Wenhao; China	47 points
500 m	Liang Wenhao; China	41.383	François Hamelin; Canada	41.456	François-Louis Tremblay; Canada	41.526
1000 m	Lee Ho-suk; South Korea	1:34.198	Kwak Yoon-gy; South Korea	1:34.231	J. R. Celski; United States	1:34.290
1500 m	Kwak Yoon-gy; South Korea	2:24.316	Sung Si-bak; South Korea	2:24.373	Lee Ho-suk; South Korea	2:24.459
5000 m relay	South Korea; Kwak Yoon-gy; Lee Ho-suk; Lee Jung-su; Kim Seoung-il	6:44.821	United States; J. R. Celski; Simon Cho; Travis Jayner; Jordan Malone	6:47.331	Germany; Paul Herrmann; Tyson Heung; Sebastian Praus; Robert Seifert	6:48.288

* First place is awarded 34 points, second is awarded 21 points, third is awarded 13 points, fourth is awarded 8 points, fifth is awarded 5 points, sixth is awarded 3 points, seventh is awarded 2 points, and eighth is awarded 1 point in the finals of each individual race to determine the overall world champion. The leader after the first 1000m in the 3000m Super-Final is awarded extra 5 points. The relays do not count for the overall classification.

=== Women ===
Event	Gold		Silver		Bronze	
Overall*	Park Seung-hi; South Korea	73 points	Wang Meng; China	68 points	Cho Ha-ri; South Korea	55 points
500 m	Wang Meng; China	43.619	Kalyna Roberge; Canada	43.679	Marianne St-Gelais; Canada	43.747
1000 m	Wang Meng; China	1:30.572	Cho Ha-ri; South Korea	1:30.643	Katherine Reutter; United States	1:31.747
1500 m	Park Seung-hi; South Korea	2:21.570	Lee Eun-byul; South Korea	2:21.665	Cho Ha-ri; South Korea	2:21.821
3000 m relay	South Korea; Cho Ha-ri; Kim Min-jung; Lee Eun-byul; Park Seung-hi; Choi Jung-won	4:08.356	Canada; Jessica Gregg; Kalyna Roberge; Marianne St-Gelais; Tania Vicent; Valérie Maltais	4:09.310	United States; Kimberly Derrick; Alyson Dudek; Lana Gehring; Katherine Reutter	4:14.231

* First place is awarded 34 points, second is awarded 21 points, third is awarded 13 points, fourth is awarded 8 points, fifth is awarded 5 points, sixth is awarded 3 points, seventh is awarded 2 points, and eighth is awarded 1 point in the finals of each individual race to determine the overall world champion. The leader after the first 1000m in the 3000m Super-Final is awarded extra 5 points. The relays do not count for the overall classification.

== Medal table ==
Rank	Nation	Gold	Silver	Bronze	Total
1	South Korea	7	5	3	15
2	China	3	1	1	5
3	Canada	0	3	2	5
4	United States	0	1	3	4
5	Germany	0	0	1	1
Totals (5 entries)		10	10	10	30
