= Kim Min-jung (speed skater) =

South Korean speed skater

Kim Min-Jung
Personal information
- Born: March 20, 1985 (age 41) Seoul, South Korea
- Height: 160 cm (5 ft 3 in)
- Weight: 106 lb (48 kg)

Sport
- Country: South Korea
- Sport: Short track speed skating
Medal record
Women's short track speed skating
Representing South Korea
World Championships
Gold medal – first place	2007 Milan	3000 m relay
Gold medal – first place	2008 Gangneung	3000 m relay
Gold medal – first place	2009 Vienna	1500 m
Gold medal – first place	2010 Sofia	3000 m relay
Silver medal – second place	2009 Vienna	1000 m
Silver medal – second place	2009 Vienna	3000 m
Silver medal – second place	2009 Vienna	Overall
Silver medal – second place	2009 Vienna	3000 m relay
World Team Championships
Gold medal – first place	2003 Sofia	Team
Gold medal – first place	2007 Budapest	Team
Gold medal – first place	2010 Bormio	Team
Silver medal – second place	2008 Harbin	Team
Silver medal – second place	2009 Heerenveen	Team
Winter Universiade
Gold medal – first place	2011 Erzurum	3000 m relay
Silver medal – second place	2005 Innsbruck	3000 m
Silver medal – second place	2011 Erzurum	1000 m
Asian Winter Games
Silver medal – second place	2007 Jangchun	3000 m relay

Kim Min-Jung (Korean: 김민정; Hanja: 金玟廷, born March 20, 1985, in Seoul) is a South Korean short track speed skater.

Kim won her first senior World Championship individual gold medal in the women's 1500 meter at the 2009 World Short Track Speed Skating Championships held in Vienna, edging out future 1500 meter Olympic champion Zhou Yang by 0.503 seconds.

In the 2010 Vancouver Winter Olympics, she competed only in the women's 3000 meter relay, combining with Lee Eun-Byul, Park Seung-Hi and Cho Ha-Ri. The South Korean team finished first but was controversially disqualified due to contact between Kim and Sun Linlin of China.

== See also ==
- South Korea at the 2010 Winter Olympics
