= 2009 World Short Track Speed Skating Championships =

The 2009 World Short Track Speed Skating Championships took place between 5 and 8 March 2009 in Vienna, Austria. The World Championships are organised by the ISU which also run world cups and championships in speed skating and figure skating.

== Results ==
=== Men ===
Event	Gold		Silver		Bronze	
Overall*	Lee Ho-suk; South Korea	89 points	J. R. Celski; United States	65 points	Charles Hamelin; Canada	47 points
500 m	Charles Hamelin; Canada	41.680	Kwak Yoon-gy; South Korea	41.739	Olivier Jean; Canada	41.855
1000 m	Lee Ho-suk; South Korea	1:33.060	Apolo Anton Ohno; United States	1:33.262	J. R. Celski; United States	1:33.478
1500 m	Lee Ho-suk; South Korea	2:20.967	Kwak Yoon-gy; South Korea	2:21.078	J. R. Celski; United States	2:21.133
5000 m relay	United States; Ryan Bedford; J. R. Celski; Jordan Malone; Apolo Ohno	6:51.400	China; Han Jialiang; Liu Xianwei; Song Weilong; Sui Baoku	6:51.957	Japan; Takahiro Fujimoto; Fumihiko Kakubari; Satoshi Sakashita; Yuzo Takamido	6:52.433

* First place is awarded 34 points, second is awarded 21 points, third is awarded 13 points, fourth is awarded 8 points, fifth is awarded 5 points, sixth is awarded 3 points, seventh is awarded 2 points, and eighth is awarded 1 point in the finals of each individual race to determine the overall world champion. The leader after the first 1000m in the 3000m Super-Final is awarded extra 5 points. The relays do not count for the overall classification.

=== Women ===
Event	Gold		Silver		Bronze	
Overall*	Wang Meng; China	81 points	Kim Min-jung; South Korea	76 points	Zhou Yang; China	63 points
500 m	Wang Meng; China	43.182	Liu Qiuhong; China	43.358	Jessica Gregg; Canada	43.437
1000 m	Wang Meng; China	1:29.878	Kim Min-jung; South Korea	1:29.974	Shin Sae-bom; South Korea	1:30.901
1500 m	Kim Min-jung; South Korea	2:21.432	Zhou Yang; China	2:21.935	Shin Sae-bom; South Korea	2:22.012
3000 m relay	China; Liu Qiuhong; Wang Meng; Zhang Hui; Zhou Yang; Fu Tianyu	4:10.531	South Korea; Jung Ba-ra; Kim Min-jung; Shin Sae-bom; Yang Shin-young; Jung Eun-ju	4:11.837	Canada; Jessica Gregg; Jessica Hewitt; Valérie Maltais; Kalyna Roberge; Anne Maltais	4:12.506

* First place is awarded 34 points, second is awarded 21 points, third is awarded 13 points, fourth is awarded 8 points, fifth is awarded 5 points, sixth is awarded 3 points, seventh is awarded 2 points, and eighth is awarded 1 point in the finals of each individual race to determine the overall world champion. The leader after the first 1000m in the 3000m Super-Final is awarded extra 5 points. The relays do not count for the overall classification.

== Medal table ==
Rank	Nation	Gold	Silver	Bronze	Total
1	South Korea	4	5	2	11
2	China	4	3	1	8
3	United States	1	2	2	5
4	Canada	1	0	4	5
5	Japan	0	0	1	1
Totals (5 entries)		10	10	10	30
