= Roberto Serra =

Italian speed skater

Personal information
- Nationality: Italian
- Born: 4 September 1982 (age 43) Aosta, Italy

Sport
- Sport: Short track speed skating
Medal record
Men's short track speed skating
Representing Great Britain
World Championships
Bronze medal – third place	2004 Gothenburg	5000 m relay
World Team Championships
Bronze medal – third place	2007 Budapest	Team

Roberto Serra (born 4 September 1982) is an Italian short track speed skater. He competed in the men's 500 metres event at the 2006 Winter Olympics.
