= François-Louis Tremblay =

Canadian short track speed skater (born 1980)

Personal information
- Born: November 13, 1980 (age 45) Alma, Quebec, Canada
- Height: 174 cm (5 ft 9 in)
- Weight: 72 kg (159 lb)

Sport
- Country: Canada
- Sport: Short track speed skating
- World championship wins: 2008–09 500m

Achievements and titles
- Personal bests: 500 m: 40.684 (2009, former WR); 1000 m: 1:24.298 (2005); 1500 m: 2:13.803 (2004); 3000 m: 4:56.977 (2007)
Medal record
Men's short track speed skating
Representing Canada
Winter Olympics
Gold medal – first place	2002 Salt Lake	5000 m relay
Gold medal – first place	2010 Vancouver	5000 m relay
Silver medal – second place	2006 Turin	500 m
Silver medal – second place	2006 Turin	5000 m relay
Bronze medal – third place	2010 Vancouver	500 m
World Championships
Gold medal – first place	2000 The Hague	Team
Gold medal – first place	2001 Nobeyama	Team
Gold medal – first place	2005 Beijing	500 m
Gold medal – first place	2005 Beijing	5000 m relay
Gold medal – first place	2005 Chuncheon	Team
Gold medal – first place	2006 Minneapolis	500 m
Gold medal – first place	2006 Minneapolis	5000 m relay
Gold medal – first place	2007 Budapest	Team
Gold medal – first place	2012 Shanghai	5000 m Relay
Silver medal – second place	1999 St. Louis	Team
Silver medal – second place	2002 Milwaukee	Team
Silver medal – second place	2005 Beijing	1500 m
Silver medal – second place	2006 Minneapolis	3000 m
Silver medal – second place	2006 Montréal	Team
Silver medal – second place	2007 Milan	500 m
Silver medal – second place	2007 Milan	5000 m relay
Silver medal – second place	2009 Heerenveen	Team
Bronze medal – third place	1999 Sofia	5000 m relay
Bronze medal – third place	2005 Beijing	Overall
Bronze medal – third place	2006 Minneapolis	Overall
Bronze medal – third place	2010 Sofia	500 m
Goodwill Games
Gold medal – first place	2000	500 m
Gold medal – first place	2000	1000 m
Gold medal – first place	2000	5000 m relay

François-Louis Tremblay (French pronunciation: [fʁɑ̃swa lwi tʁɑ̃blɛ]; born November 13, 1980) is a Canadian retired short track speed skater and five-time Olympic medallist who competed at the 2002, 2006 and 2010 Winter Olympics.

Tremblay is one of only three Canadian men to win 5 medals at the Winter Olympic games, the other men being Marc Gagnon and Charles Hamelin. At the 2002 Winter Olympic Games in Salt Lake City, Tremblay was a member of Canada's gold medal-winning 5,000-meter relay team. In Turin, Italy, at the 2006 Olympic Winter Games, he won two silver medals. He won an individual medal by finishing second in the men's 500-meter race and also took part in the men's 5,000-meter relay that finished second behind the South Korean team. He added a bronze medal in the 500 m and gold medal in the 5000 m relay in 2010.

Tremblay was a two-time world champion at 500 meters, having won back-to-back titles at the 2005 World Short Track Championships in Beijing and again at the 2006 World Short Track Championships in Minneapolis.

== Career ==
Tremblay's career has been one as a prominent member of the Canadian short track team. The emphasis is particularly on team, as Tremblay has featured prominently as a member of the relay team helping it to a gold medal during the 2002 Olympics and a silver medal in Turin 2006. It was at the Turin Olympics that Tremblay won his first individual medal finishing 2nd behind Apolo Anton Ohno in the 500 m. Tremblay is currently second on the all-time medals list for Canadian short-trackers in medals received in the Olympics and World Championships, although 7 of his 9 gold medals were either a part of the relay team or World Team Championships. He did win the 500 m world crown back to back in 2005 and 2006, following by a silver medal behind teammate Charles Hamelin in 2007.

The 500 m became Tremblay's premier event, one which he bloomed into late only winning his first individual world medal in the event in 2005. Despite his late arrival as an elite athlete, he has excelled at a point of life in which most short trackers are considering retirement. Tremblay won the 2008-09 World Cup overall in the 500 m, and in the shortened 2009-10 World Cup season he finished second overall in the 500 m to teammate Charles Hamelin again. Tremblay continued to anchor the relay team together with Hamelin. After losing the men's relay at the world cup event in Canada he made a guarantee saying "next time we're going to win...we're going to win the gold medal" in the relay at the 2010 Winter Olympics.

=== 2010 Vancouver Olympics ===
At Tremblay's age of 29 these were likely his last games and therefore his first and last games on home soil. In the opening heat of the 500 m Francois-Louis Tremblay broke Charles Hamelin's Olympic Record which had just been set the heat before. The record was now set at 41.397 seconds. On February 26, he won two medals in one night. He won a bronze medal in the 500 m, with his teammate Charles Hamelin winning gold. He then won a gold medal in the 5000 m relay along with Charles Hamelin, François Hamelin, Olivier Jean and Guillaume Bastille. With the two medals at the Olympics, Tremblay tied a record set by Marc Gagnon as the only Canadian men to win 5 medals in the Winter Olympics.
