= Kwak Yoon-gy =

South Korean short track speed skater

Kwak Yoon-Gy
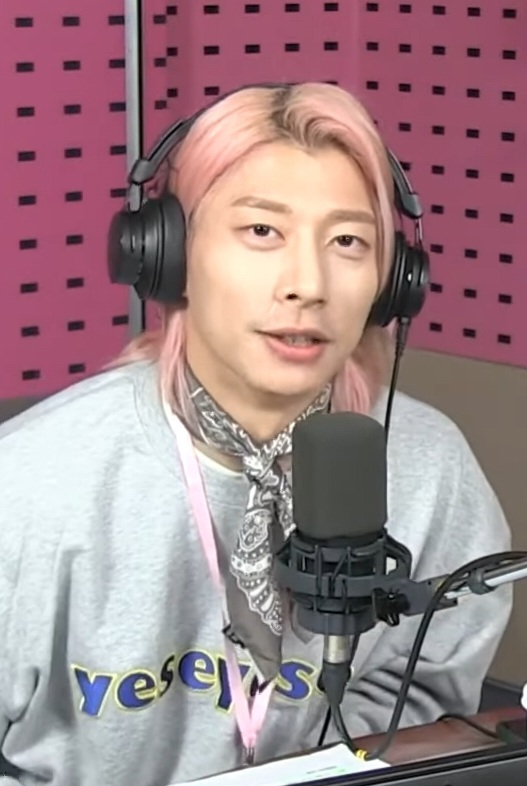

Personal information
- Nationality: South Korean
- Born: 26 December 1989 (age 36) Seoul, South Korea
- Height: 1.65 m (5 ft 5 in)
- Weight: 145 lb (66 kg)

Sport
- Country: South Korea
- Sport: Short track speed skating
- Club: Goyang City Hall
- World championship wins: 2012 Overall
Medal record
Men's short track speed skating
Representing South Korea
Olympic Games
Silver medal – second place	2010 Vancouver	5000 m relay
Silver medal – second place	2022 Beijing	5000 m relay
World Championships
Gold medal – first place	2008 Gangneung	5000 m relay
Gold medal – first place	2010 Sofia	1500 m
Gold medal – first place	2010 Sofia	5000 m relay
Gold medal – first place	2012 Shanghai	Overall
Gold medal – first place	2012 Shanghai	1000 m
Gold medal – first place	2018 Montreal	5000 m relay
Gold medal – first place	2022 Montreal	5000 m relay
Silver medal – second place	2009 Vienna	500 m
Silver medal – second place	2009 Vienna	1500 m
Silver medal – second place	2010 Sofia	Overall
Silver medal – second place	2010 Sofia	1000 m
Silver medal – second place	2012 Shanghai	1500 m
Bronze medal – third place	2012 Shanghai	500 m
Bronze medal – third place	2012 Shanghai	5000 m relay
Bronze medal – third place	2016 Seoul	5000 m relay
Bronze medal – third place	2022 Montreal	1000 m
World Team Championships
Gold medal – first place	2009 Heerenveen	Team
Gold medal – first place	2010 Bormio	Team
Bronze medal – third place	2008 Harbin	Team
World Cup
Silver medal – second place	2021–22 Final	5000 m relay
World Junior Championships
Bronze medal – third place	2005 Belgrade	Overall

- Kwak Yoon-gy
- Hangul: 곽윤기
- Hanja: 郭潤起
- RR: Gwak Yungi
- MR: Kwak Yun'gi

Kwak Yoon-Gy (Korean: 곽윤기; Korean pronunciation: [kwak̚ jun.ɡi] or [kwa.ɡjun.ɡi]; born 26 December 1989) is a South Korean former short track speed skater. He is the 2012 Overall World Champion. He is also the two-time Olympics silver medalist in the 2010 and 2022 Winter Olympic Games.

== Philanthropy ==
On 9 March 2022, Kwak donated ₩30 million to the Hope Bridge Disaster Relief Association to help the victims of the massive wildfires that started in Uljin, Gyeongbuk. and also spread to Samcheok, Gangwon.

== Filmography ==
=== Television shows ===
Year	Title	Role	Ref.
2022	Three Army	Host	
2022	Don't Be Me, Heart	Host	
2022	Tomorrow is a Genius	Cast Member	

== See also ==
- List of 2010 Winter Olympics medal winners
- List of 2022 Winter Olympics medal winners
