= Nicolas Bean =

Short track speed skater

Personal information
- Nationality: Italian
- Born: 1987 (age 38–39) Ottawa, Ontario, Canada

Sport
- Sport: Speed skating

Nicolas (bam-bam) Bean (born 1987) is a Canadian-Italian short track speed skater. He represented Italy at the 2010 Winter Olympics in Vancouver.
