= Jordan Malone =

Short track speed skater (born 1984)

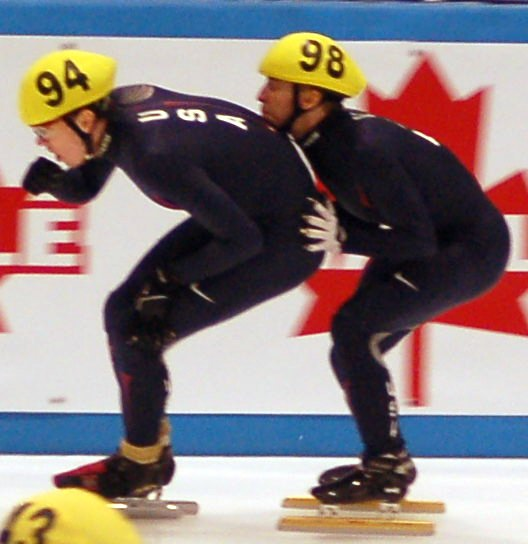
- Malone (#98) & Ryan Bedford (#94) in 2007

Personal information
- Born: April 20, 1984 (age 42) Denton, Texas, U.S.
- Height: 5 ft 6 in (168 cm)
- Weight: 145 lb (66 kg)
- Website: JordanMalone.com

Sport
- Country: United States
- Sport: Short track speed skating
- Club: FAST Team
Medal record
Men's short track speed skating
Representing the United States
Olympic Games
Silver medal – second place	2014 Sochi	5000 m relay
Bronze medal – third place	2010 Vancouver	5000 m relay
World Championships
Gold medal – first place	2009 Vienna	5000 m relay
Silver medal – second place	2010 Sofia	5000 m relay
Bronze medal – third place	2005 Beijing	5000 m relay
Bronze medal – third place	2006 Minneapolis	5000 m relay
Bronze medal – third place	2007 Milan	5000 m relay
World Team Championships
Gold medal – first place	2008 Harbin	Team
Bronze medal – third place	2009 Heerenveen	Team

Jordan Malone (born April 20, 1984) is an American short track speed skater who was a member of the US Olympic Team for the 2010 Winter Olympics in Vancouver, British Columbia. He is from Denton, Texas, and is an alumnus of the Texas Tech University Independent School District. Jordan competed in the 2014 Olympic Games in Sochi, Russia.

== Personal life ==
Jordan is a 42-year-old native of Denton, Texas and the only child of single mother, Peggy Aitken. He has lived in Nante, France; Oldebroek, the Netherlands; Long Beach, California; Colorado Springs, Colorado, and Salt Lake City, Utah. His unusual life has taken him around the world to over 154 cities in 18 countries on 4 continents. Malone studied mechanical engineering at Massachusetts Institute of Technology.

== Inline speed skating ==
Jordan began inline speed skating in 1990 at the age of 5, and participated in his first international race in 1995. He made his first World Team in 2000, and turned professional the following year. In 2001, he earned the title of most decorated junior of all time, and in 2003 he was the fastest man in the world, winning the Senior World Championships.

Jordan left the sport of Inline with a total of 8 Junior and 6 Senior World Championship titles. He also competed on the Rollerblade, Inc. and Mogema WIC (World Inline Cup) Professional teams from 2001 to 2004.

Jordan credits his mother with enabling him to succeed in sports. Although she was not an athlete herself, Jordan says she taught him the life lessons he needed, including attention to detail. She also spent years driving Jordan to practices and meets, including a two-hour trip to Waco, Texas every weekend. She even had a hand in his training: Jordan said she had a moped, which she used to pace him while he skated behind her on inlines.

=== Injuries (Inline Speed Skating) ===
In 2002, as an inline skater, Jordan was twice sidelined by significant injuries. First, while warming up at a meet, Jordan slipped and his left foot hit the boards and twisted, resulting in a spiral fracture. Jordan spent four months in a walking cast, during which he could only train by riding a bike or running in water.

Two weeks after returning, another freak accident left him hospitalized: Jordan tripped over a timing wire during a race, and went headfirst into the timing device that had no padding. When Jordan woke up in a hospital in Switzerland, they told him he broke his upper jaw, lost four teeth, and had been convulsing during the 20 minutes it took to stabilize him at the scene. Jordan ended up with four plates and 16 screws in his head to keep his jaw in place.

Jordan momentarily considered quitting at that point. "And then, 'What am I thinking?' No way am I done," Jordan said. "This is what I love to do."

== Short Track Speed Skating ==
Since his birth into the sport of Short Track Speed skating in 2004, Jordan has been the only skater to compete in all of the past 5 World Championships (2005–2009) for the US, making 2009 his 10th consecutive US World Championship including both Inline and Ice. He is the first skater (still the only male) to ever qualify for both Inline and Short Track World Teams, and he did so in consecutive years. In the past 5 years, he's achieved numerous World titles, including 6 World Championship medals (2009 Men's Relay GOLD). In 2007 he earned 7th overall at the ISU World Championships, and in 2008 was ranked 5th in the 1500m, and 6th in the 1000m ISU World Cup Overall classification.

=== Career highlights ===
2005 World Cup 6: Gold – Men's Relay
2005 World Championships: Bronze – Men's Relay
2006 World Championship: Bronze – Men's Relay
2006-07 World Cup Series: Bronze – Men's Relay (WC3); 1000m Silver (WC4); Gold – 1000m (WC5); Gold – 1500m (WC5); Bronze – 1000m (WC6)
2007 World Championships: 1500m – 4th overall; 500m – 5th overall; 3000m – 8th overall; Bronze – Men's Relay
2007-08 World Cup Series: Bronze – 1000m (WC4); Bronze – 1500m (WC4)
2008 World Team Championship: Gold
2008-09 World Cup Series: Silver – 1000m (WC5)
2009 World Championships: Gold – Men's Relay
2009 World Team Championships – Bronze
