= Ryan Bedford =

American speed skater

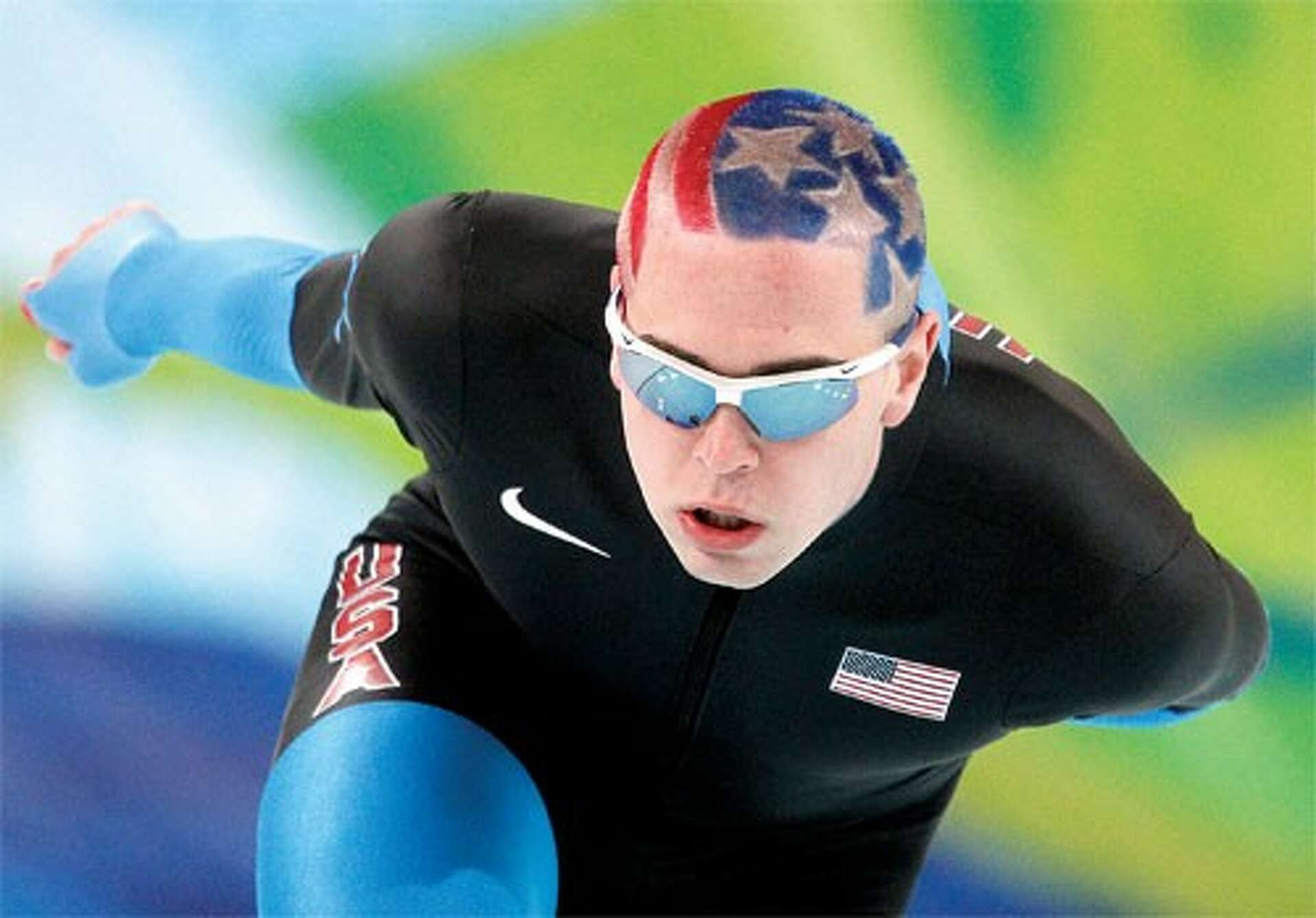
- Ryan Bedford, 2010 Olympics

Personal information
- Born: October 20, 1986 (age 39) Yuma, Arizona, U.S.
- Height: 6 ft 2 in (188 cm)
- Weight: 190 lb (86 kg)

Sport
- Country: United States
- Sport: Speed skating
Medal record
Representing the United States
Men's short track speed skating
World Championships
Gold medal – first place	2009 Vienna	5000 m relay
Men's speed skating
World Single Distance Championships
Bronze medal – third place	2009 Vancouver	Team pursuit

Ryan Bedford (born October 20, 1986) is an American speed skater who competed at the 2010 Winter Olympics. Bedford is now a real estate developer, entrepreneur, and philanthropist.
