= Jon Eley =

British speed skater

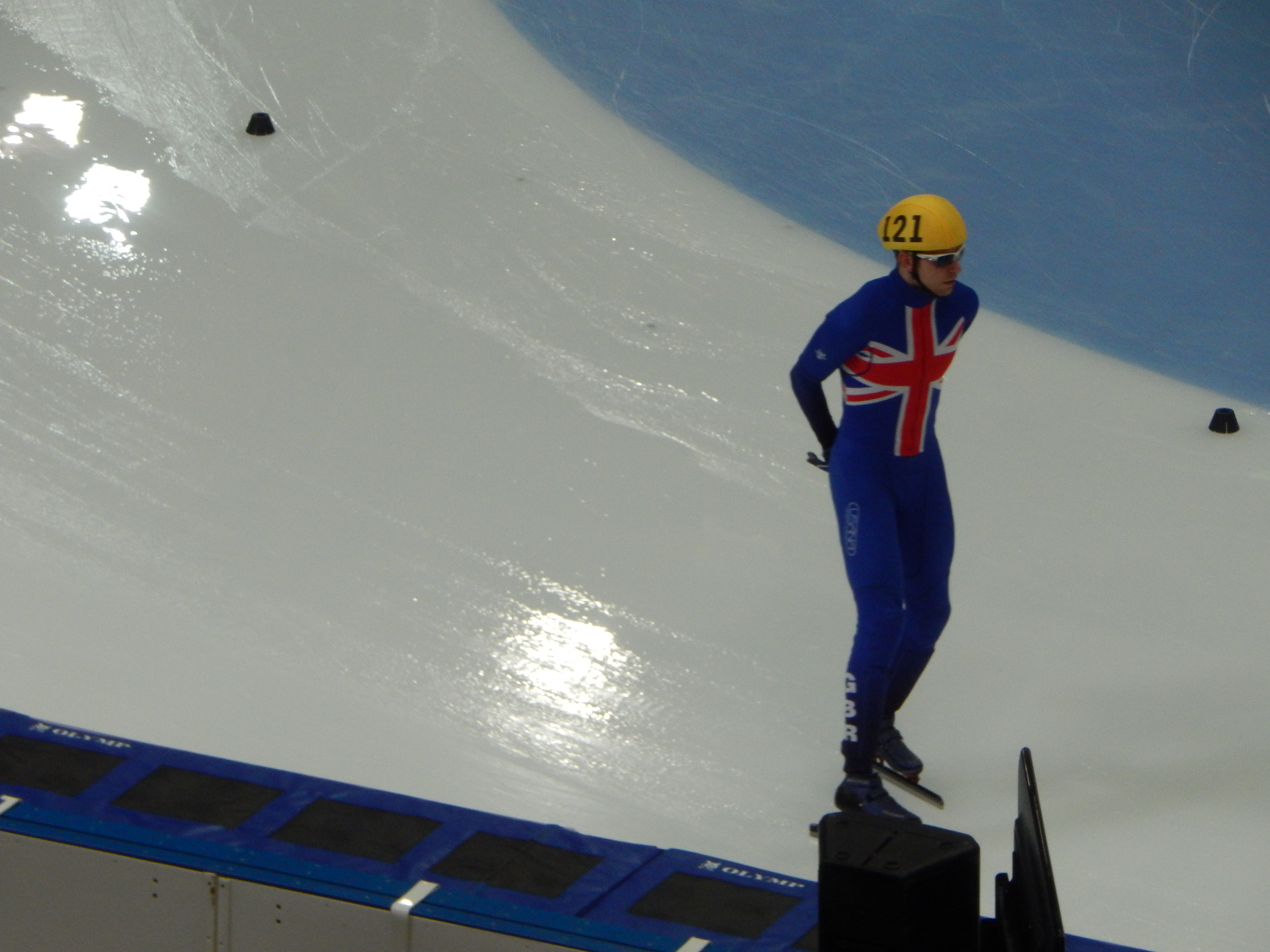
- John Eley, 2015

Medal record

Men's short track speed skating

Representing Great Britain

World Championships
Bronze medal – third place	2008 Gangneung	5000 m relay
Bronze medal – third place	2014 Montreal	5000 m relay

World Junior Championships
Bronze medal – third place	2004 Beijing	Overall

Jon Eley (born 19 August 1984 in Solihull) is a British short track speed skater who competed at the 2006 Winter Olympics, the 2010 Winter Olympics and the 2014 Winter Olympics. Eley finished fifth in the 500 metres in Torino, and was a member of the British team that finished sixth in the 5000 metre relay in Vancouver.

Eley was part of the British 5,000m relay team that broke the world record in February 2011.

On 6 February 2014 it was announced that Eley would be the flagbearer for the Great Britain team at the 2014 Winter Olympics in Sochi, Russia. After retiring, he took up a role as Performance & Talent Manager for British Ice Skating.

Winter Olympics
Preceded by Shelley Rudman	Flagbearer for Great Britain; Sochi 2014	Succeeded by Lizzie Yarnold
