= Lee Ho-suk =

South Korean short track speedskater

Personal information
- Native name: 이호석
- Born: June 25, 1986 (age 40) Seoul, South Korea
- Height: 168 cm (5 ft 6 in)
- Weight: 62 kg (137 lb)

Sport
- Country: South Korea
- Sport: Speed skating
- Club: Goyang City
- Retired: April 12, 2015
- World championship wins: 2010 Overall; 2009 Overall
Medal record
Men's short track speed skating
Representing South Korea
Event	1st	2nd	3rd
Olympic Games	1	4	0
World Championships	9	7	3
World Team Championships	3	0	1
Olympic Games
Gold medal – first place	2006 Turin	5000 m relay
Silver medal – second place	2006 Turin	1000 m
Silver medal – second place	2006 Turin	1500 m
Silver medal – second place	2010 Vancouver	1000 m
Silver medal – second place	2010 Vancouver	5000 m relay
World Championships
Gold medal – first place	2008 Gangneung	1000 m
Gold medal – first place	2008 Gangneung	5000 m relay
Gold medal – first place	2009 Vienna	Overall
Gold medal – first place	2009 Vienna	1000 m
Gold medal – first place	2009 Vienna	1500 m
Gold medal – first place	2010 Sofia	Overall
Gold medal – first place	2010 Sofia	1000 m
Gold medal – first place	2010 Sofia	3000 m
Gold medal – first place	2010 Sofia	5000 m relay
Silver medal – second place	2006 Minneapolis	Overall
Silver medal – second place	2006 Minneapolis	1000 m
Silver medal – second place	2006 Minneapolis	1500 m
Silver medal – second place	2008 Gangneung	Overall
Silver medal – second place	2008 Gangneung	1500 m
Silver medal – second place	2009 Vienna	3000 m
Silver medal – second place	2014 Montreal	5000 m relay
Bronze medal – third place	2006 Minneapolis	500 m
Bronze medal – third place	2010 Sofia	1500 m
Bronze medal – third place	2012 Shanghai	5000 m Relay
World Team Championships
Gold medal – first place	2006 Montréal	Team
Gold medal – first place	2009 Heerenveen	Team
Gold medal – first place	2010 Bormio	Team
Bronze medal – third place	2008 Harbin	Team
World Junior Championships
Gold medal – first place	2003 Budapest	Overall
Gold medal – first place	2004 Beijing	Overall
Gold medal – first place	2005 Belgrade	Overall

Lee Ho-suk (Korean: 이호석, Hanja: 李昊錫, Korean pronunciation: [i.ɦo.sʌk̚]; born June 25, 1986) is a South Korean short track speedskater. He won a gold medal as a part of 5000 m short-track relay team and four silver medals in 2006 Winter Olympics held in Turin, Italy. He is the overall world champion for 2009 and 2010.

== Career ==
Known especially for his dynamic outside pass, Lee is regarded as one of the best young skaters in the world. At the 2006 Winter Olympics, Lee made a thrilling move to pass Apolo Ohno on the final lap of the 1000 m, securing a 1-2 finish for Korea in the event.

Lee won three consecutive overall World Junior titles from 2003 to 2005. In 2006, his first full season on the World Cup circuit, Lee finished second behind Ahn Hyun-Soo in the overall standings. At the 2006 Winter Olympics, Lee earned two individual silver medals in the 1000 and 1500 meters behind his teammate, Ahn Hyun-Soo at the 2006 Winter Olympics in Turin, Italy. Lee also won gold in the 5000 meter relay along with countrymen Ahn Hyun-Soo, Seo Ho-Jin and Song Suk-Woo. The Korean team defeated two-time defending Olympic champion Canada with a powerful pass by Ahn in the closing laps. Lee also finished second overall at the 2006 Short Track World Championships held in Minneapolis, MN.

At the 2009 World Short Track Speed Skating Championships in Vienna, Lee became the Overall World Champion and went on to win his domestic Olympic Trials a few months later, becoming the leader of the Korean Short Track Team, as well as one of the top contenders to win gold in 2010 Winter Olympics in Vancouver, British Columbia, Canada.

At the 2010 Winter Olympics, South Korea was in position to sweep the 1500m until Lee accidentally crashed into Sung Si-Bak and took them both out of contention entering the final turn, giving the silver and bronze medals to Americans Apolo Ohno and J. R. Celski, respectively. He was disqualified because he caused the crash with Sung Si-Bak. He qualified for the final round of the quarter finals of the 1000m short track race with a time of 1:25.925. Lee won his second consecutive Overall World Championships after the Olympics.

== See also ==
- South Korea at the 2006 Winter Olympics
- South Korea at the 2010 Winter Olympics
