= Tyson Heung =

German speed skater (born 1979)

Medal record

Men's short track speed skating

Representing Germany

World Championships
Bronze medal – third place	2010 Sofia	5000 m relay

Tyson Heung (born May 17, 1979, in Brampton, Ontario, Canada) is a German speed skater. He competed at the 2006 Winter Olympics in Turin. He represented Germany at the 2010 Winter Olympics in Vancouver . He finished 5th in the 500m event. He was the winner of the 500m world cup title for the 2006–2007 season. His mother was born in Germany.

Heung is a graduate of McGill University.

Today Heung is now a teacher at SAA(Sainte-Agathe Academy) https://saa.swlauriersb.qc.ca
