= Thibaut Fauconnet =

French speed skater (born 1985)

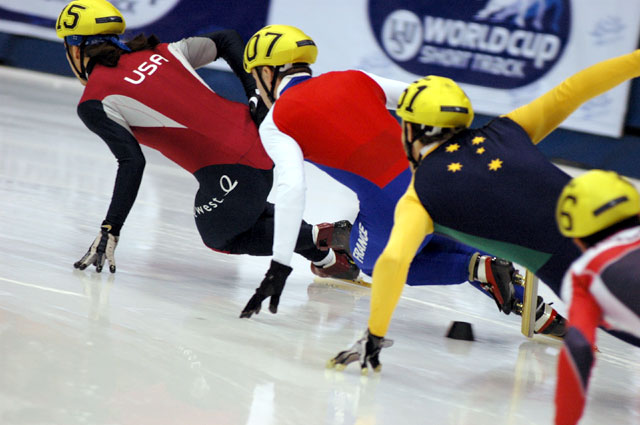
- Fauconnet trailing Apolo Ohno in a World Cup race, 2004.

Personal information
- Born: 23 April 1985 (age 41) Dijon, France
- Height: 5 ft 7 1/2 in (171 cm)
- Weight: 154 lb (70 kg)

Sport
- Country: France
- Sport: Short track speed skating
Medal record
Men's short track speed skating
Representing France
European Championships
Silver medal – second place	2010 Dresden	Overall
Silver medal – second place	2018 Dresden	3000 m SF
Disqualified	2011 Heerenveen	Overall
Disqualified	2012 Mladá Boleslav	Overall

Thibaut Fauconnet (French pronunciation: [tibo fokɔnɛ]; born 23 April 1985) is a French short track speed skater. He represented France at the 2010 Winter Olympics in Vancouver, the 2014 Winter Olympics in Sochi, and the 2018 Winter Olympics in Pyeongchang.
