= Yuri Confortola =

Italian short track speed skater

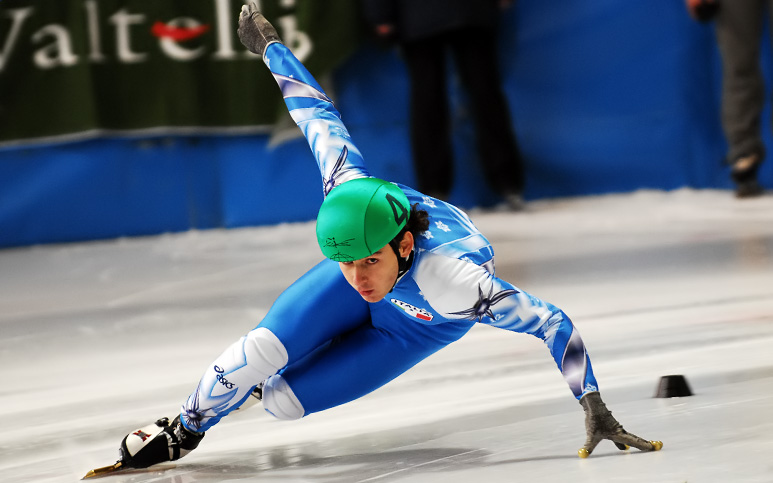
- Confortola at the Alta Valtellina Trophy 2006

Personal information
- Nationality: Italian
- Born: 24 April 1986 (age 40) Tirano, Italy
- Height: 1.69 m (5 ft 7 in)
- Weight: 69 kg (152 lb)

Sport
- Country: Italy
- Sport: Short track speed skating
- Club: CS Carabinieri
Medal record
Men's short track speed skating
Representing Italy
Olympic Games
Silver medal – second place	2022 Beijing	Mixed 2000 m relay
Bronze medal – third place	2022 Beijing	5000 m relay
World Championships
Bronze medal – third place	2021 Dordrecht	5000 m relay
World Team Championships
Bronze medal – third place	2007 Budapest
European Championships
Gold medal – first place	2006 Krynica-Zdrój	5000 m relay
Gold medal – first place	2008 Ventspils	5000 m relay
Gold medal – first place	2009 Turin	5000 m relay
Gold medal – first place	2010 Dresden	5000 m relay
Silver medal – second place	2007 Sheffield	1000 m
Silver medal – second place	2009 Turin	1000 m
Silver medal – second place	2021 Gdańsk	5000 m relay
Bronze medal – third place	2007 Sheffield	Overall
Bronze medal – third place	2009 Turin	500 m
Bronze medal – third place	2013 Malmö	1500 m
Bronze medal – third place	2017 Turin	5000 m relay
Bronze medal – third place	2020 Debrecen	5000 m relay
World Military Games
Silver medal – second place	2017 Sochi	1000 m
Silver medal – second place	2017 Sochi	3000 m mixed

Yuri Confortola (born 24 April 1986) is a short-track speed skater who competed for Italy at the 2006 Winter Olympics, at the 2010 Winter Olympics, at the 2014 Winter Olympics, at the 2018 Winter Olympics and at the 2022 Winter Olympics.
