= Nicola Rodigari =

Italian short-track speed skater

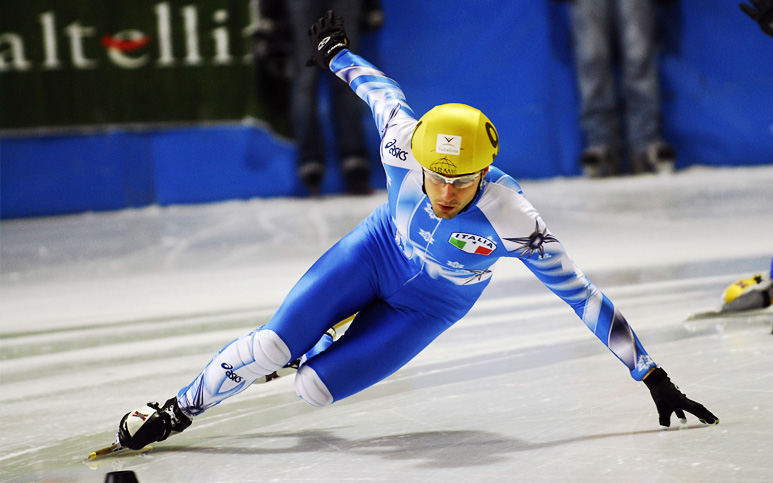
- Rodigari at 15th Alta Valtellina Trophy in 2006

Medal record

Men's Short Track Speed Skating

Representing Italy

Olympic Games
Silver medal – second place	2002 Salt Lake City	5000 m relay

World Championships
Silver medal – second place	2007 Milan	1500 m
Bronze medal – third place	2000 Sheffield	5000 m relay
Bronze medal – third place	2004 Gothenburg	5000 m relay

World Team Championships
Bronze medal – third place	1998 Bormio	Team
Bronze medal – third place	2000 The Hague	Team
Bronze medal – third place	2007 Budapest	Team

European Championships
Gold medal – first place	2004 Zoetermeer	Overall
Gold medal – first place	2006 Krynica-Zdrój	Overall
Gold medal – first place	2007 Sheffield	Overall
Gold medal – first place	2009 Turin	Overall
Gold medal – first place	2010 Dresden	Overall
Silver medal – second place	2002 Grenoble	Overall
Bronze medal – third place	2008 Ventspils	Overall

World Military Games
Silver medal – second place	2017 Sochi	3000 m mixed

World Junior Championships
Silver medal – second place	2000 Székesfehérvár	Overall

Nicola Rodigari (born 7 November 1981) is an Italian short track speed skater who competed in the 2002, 2006 and 2010 Winter Olympics.

He was born in Tirano.

In 2002 he was a member of the Italian relay team which won the silver medal in the 5000 metre relay competition. In the 1000 metre event he finished 13th and in the 1500 metre contest he finished 14th.

Four years later he was part of the Italian team which finished fourth in the 5000 metre relay competition. In the 500 metre event as well as in the 1000 metre contest he finished seventh and in the 1500 metre competition he finished 14th.
