= Chronological summary of the 2014 Winter Olympics =

This article contains a chronological summary of major events from the 2014 Winter Olympics in Sochi, Russia.

== Calendar ==
In the following calendar each blue box represents one or more event competition(s), such as a qualification round, on that day. The yellow boxes represent medal-awarding finals for a sport with in each box the number of finals that were contested on that day.

All dates are MSK (UTC+4)

OC	Opening ceremony	●	Event competitions	1	Event finals	EG	Exhibition gala	CC	Closing ceremony

February	6th Thu	7th Fri	8th Sat	9th Sun	10th Mon	11th Tue	12th Wed	13th Thu	14th Fri	15th Sat	16th Sun	17th Mon	18th Tue	19th Wed	20th Thu	21st Fri	22nd Sat	23rd Sun	Events
Ceremonies		OC																CC	—N/a
Alpine skiing				1	1		1		1	1	1		1	1		1	1		10
Biathlon			1	1	1	1		1	1			1	1	1		1	1		11
Bobsleigh											●	1	●	1			●	1	3
Cross-country skiing			1	1		2		1	1	1	1			2			1	1	12
Curling					●	●	●	●	●	●	●	●	●	●	1	1			2
Figure skating	●		●	1		●	1	●	1		●	1		●	1		EG		5
Freestyle skiing	●		1		1	1		1	1			1	1		2	1			10
Ice hockey			●	●	●	●	●	●	●	●	●	●	●	●	1	●	●	1	2
Luge			●	1	●	1	1	1											4
Nordic combined							1						1		1				3
Short track speed skating					1			1		2			1			3			8
Skeleton								●	1	1									2
Ski jumping			●	1		1			●	1		1							4
Snowboarding	●		1	1		1	1				1		1	2			2		10
Speed skating			1	1	1	1	1	1		1	1		1	1		●	2		12
Daily medal events			5	8	5	8	6	6	6	7	4	5	7	8	6	7	7	3	98
Cumulative total			5	13	18	26	32	38	44	51	55	60	67	75	81	88	95	98	98
February	6th Thu	7th Fri	8th Sat	9th Sun	10th Mon	11th Tue	12th Wed	13th Thu	14th Fri	15th Sat	16th Sun	17th Mon	18th Tue	19th Wed	20th Thu	21st Fri	22nd Sat	23rd Sun	Total events

== Day 0 – Thursday 6 February ==
Twelve new events were added for the games. For this reason competition started a day before the opening ceremony. This marks the first time in the history of the Winter Olympics that competitions were held before the opening ceremony.

Figure skating

- In the team trophy competition, the men's short and the pairs short were held. The Russians led the day with 19 points, with Evgeni Plushenko's nine points in the men's short, and Tatiana Volosozhar and Maxim Trankov's ten points in the pairs short. Japan's Yuzuru Hanyu earned ten points to finish in first place in the men's short, but Narumi Takahashi and Ryuichi Kihara only gained three more points for Japan in the pairs short. Canada and China finish the day holding the second and third overall positions, respectively.

Freestyle skiing

- Hannah Kearney of the United States finished in first place in the first qualifying round of the women's moguls with a score of 23.05. The top ten move on to the third round, while the remaining 20 move onto Round 2.

Snowboarding

- Canada's Maxence Parrot led the qualification round of the men's slopestyle with a best score of 97.50, while Switzerland's Isabel Derungs led the qualification round of the women's slopestyle with a best score of 87.50. The top four in each heat automatically advance to the final, while the remaining athletes progress to the semifinal.

== Day 1 – Friday 7 February ==
Opening ceremony

- The opening ceremony started at 20:14 MSK at Fisht Olympic Stadium, with an audience of 40,000 in attendance. Russian President Vladimir Putin declared the games officially open, while Irina Rodnina and Vladislav Tretiak jointly lit the Olympic cauldron installed at the Sochi Medals Plaza in the Sochi Olympic Park.

== Day 2 – Saturday 8 February ==
Biathlon

- Ole Einar Bjørndalen of Norway won the gold medal in the men's sprint with a time of 24:33.5, while Dominik Landertinger of Austria recorded a time of 24:34.8 to win the silver and Jaroslav Soukup of the Czech Republic earned the bronze with a time of 24:39.2. Bjørndalen tied the record for most Winter Olympics medals.

Cross-country skiing

- Marit Bjørgen of Norway finished the women's 15 km skiathlon with a time of 38:33.6 to win the gold medal. Sweden's Charlotte Kalla finished with the silver with a time of 38:35.4, and Heidi Weng of Norway took the bronze with a time of 38:46.8.

Figure skating

- On the second day of the team trophy competition, Meryl Davis and Charlie White of the United States led the ice dance short program with 10 points. In the women's short program, Yulia Lipnitskaya led all competitors by earning 10 points for Russia. Ksenia Stolbova and Fedor Klimov also earned 10 points for Russia in the pairs free program. The five teams that advanced to the final day of competition were Russia (47 points), Canada (41) USA (34), Italy (31) and Japan (30).

Freestyle skiing

- In the women's moguls, Russia's Ekaterina Stolyarova came in first in the second qualifying round to advance to the final along with nine others. Then in final, Canadian sisters Justine and Chloé Dufour-Lapointe took gold and silver, respectively, while Hannah Kearney of the United States finished third.

Ice hockey

- Women's tournament
  - Preliminary round – Group A
    - United States 3–1 Finland
    - Canada 5–0 Switzerland

Luge

- The first two runs of the men's singles were held.

Ski jumping

- In the qualification round of the men's normal hill individual, Michael Hayböck of Austria led all competitors with a score of 128.6. He will join 39 others, and 10 jumpers from the World Cup, in the finals.

Snowboarding

- In the men's slopestyle, Billy Morgan (Great Britain), Sage Kotsenburg (United States), Mark McMorris (Canada) and Yuki Kadono (Japan) finished in the top four in the semifinal to qualify for the final. Kotsenburg then won the gold in the final with a score of 93.50 on his first run. Ståle Sandbech (Norway) won the silver with a score of 91.75 and McMorris earned the bronze with 88.75.

Speed skating

- Sven Kramer of the Netherlands set an Olympic record of 6:10.76 in the men's 5000 metres to win the gold medal, while fellow Dutch skaters Jan Blokhuijsen and Jorrit Bergsma recorded times of 6:15.71 and 6:16.66 to earn the other two medals, respectively.

Gold medalists
Sport	Event	Competitor(s)	NOC	Rec	Ref
Biathlon	Men's sprint	Ole Einar Bjørndalen	Norway		
Cross-country skiing	Women's 15 km skiathlon	Marit Bjørgen	Norway		
Freestyle skiing	Women's moguls	Justine Dufour-Lapointe	Canada		
Snowboarding	Men's slopestyle	Sage Kotsenburg	United States		
Speed skating	Men's 5000 metres	Sven Kramer	Netherlands	OR	

== Day 3 – Sunday 9 February ==
Alpine skiing

- Matthias Mayer of Austria won the gold in the men's downhill with a time of 2:06.23, beating Christof Innerhofer of Italy by 0.06 seconds, and Kjetil Jansrud of Norway by 0.10 seconds.

Biathlon

- In the women's sprint, Anastasiya Kuzmina of Slovakia became the first female biathlete to repeat as Olympic champion. Russia's Olga Vilukhina finished 19.9 seconds behind to win the silver and Ukraine's Vita Semerenko finished 21.7 seconds behind to win the bronze.

Cross-country skiing

- In the men's 30 km skiathlon, Dario Cologna of Switzerland took home the gold medal with a total time of 1:08:15.4. Marcus Hellner of Sweden finished 0.4 seconds behind Cologna to win the silver, and Martin Johnsrud Sundby of Norway finished 1.4 seconds behind to take the bronze.

Figure skating

- In the third and final day of the team trophy competition, Russia won the gold medal with 75 points, while Canada finished in second with 65 points, and the United States in third with 60 points. For Russia, Evgeni Plushenko scored ten points in the men's free program, and Yulia Lipnitskaya had ten points in the women's free program. Meryl Davis and Charlie White of the United States led the ice dance free program with 10 points.

Ice hockey

- Women's tournament
  - Preliminary round – Group B
    - Sweden 1–0 Japan
    - Russia 4–1 Germany

Luge

- The two final runs of the men's singles were held. Germany's Felix Loch won the gold, with Russia's Albert Demchenko winning silver at 0.088 behind, and Italy's Armin Zöggeler winning bronze at +0.230 behind.

Ski jumping

- Kamil Stoch of Poland recorded a total score of 276.7 in the men's normal hill individual to win the gold medal. Slovenian Peter Prevc finished in second with 265.8, and Anders Bardal of Norway held third place with 264.1.

Snowboarding

- In the women's slopestyle, Šárka Pančochová (Czech Republic), Sina Candrian (Switzerland), Jenny Jones (Great Britain) and Silje Norendal (Norway) finished in the top four in the semifinal to qualify for the final. In the final, Jamie Anderson of the United States won gold with a score of 95.25, while Enni Rukajärvi of Finland finished second with 92.50, and Jones won the bronze medal with 87.25 points.

Speed skating

- Ireen Wüst of the Netherlands won gold in the women's 3000 metres with a time of 4:00.34. Martina Sáblíková of the Czech Republic took the silver medal at 1.61 seconds back, and Russia's Olga Graf came in third place at 3.13 back.

Gold medalists
Sport	Event	Competitor(s)	NOC	Rec	Ref
Alpine skiing	Men's downhill	Matthias Mayer	Austria		
Biathlon	Women's sprint	Anastasiya Kuzmina	Slovakia		
Cross-country skiing	Men's 30 km skiathlon	Dario Cologna	Switzerland		
Figure skating	Team trophy	Evgeni Plushenko; Yulia Lipnitskaya; Tatiana Volosozhar / Maxim Trankov; Ksenia Stolbova / Fedor Klimov; Ekaterina Bobrova / Dmitri Soloviev; Elena Ilinykh / Nikita Katsalapov	Russia		
Luge	Men's singles	Felix Loch	Germany		
Ski jumping	Men's normal hill individual	Kamil Stoch	Poland		
Snowboarding	Women's slopestyle	Jamie Anderson	United States		
Speed skating	Women's 3000 metres	Ireen Wüst	Netherlands		

== Day 4 – Monday 10 February ==
Alpine skiing

- Maria Höfl-Riesch of Germany won the gold medal in the women's combined with a total time of 2:34.62. Nicole Hosp of Austria finished second at 0.40 seconds back, and Julia Mancuso of the United States took away the bronze medal at 0.53 seconds back. Mancuso led the downhill section of the race at 1:42.68, with Lara Gut of Switzerland in second at 1:43.15 and Tina Maze of Slovenia in third at 1:43.54. Šárka Strachová of the Czech Republic finished first in the slalom section at 50.10, Michaela Kirchgasser of Austria in second at 50.69, and Maria Höfl-Riesch of Germany in third at 50.90.

Biathlon

- France's Martin Fourcade won the gold medal in the men's pursuit by a margin of 14.1 seconds. Ondřej Moravec of the Czech Republic finished second, with no penalties in the whole race. The bronze medal went to France's Jean-Guillaume Béatrix, who finished 24.2 seconds back.

Curling

- Men's tournament
  - Round robin, draw 1
    - Russia 4–7 Great Britain
    - Switzerland 5–7 Sweden
    - Denmark 4–7 China
    - Germany 8–11 Canada
  - Round robin, draw 2
    - Sweden 8–4 Great Britain
    - Canada 4–5 Switzerland
    - United States 4–7 Norway
    - Denmark 11–10 Russia
- Women's tournament
  - Round robin, draw 1
    - China 2–9 Canada
    - Switzerland 7–4 United States
    - Sweden 6–4 Great Britain
    - Russia 7–4 Denmark

Freestyle skiing

- In the men's moguls, Alexandre Bilodeau and Mikaël Kingsbury (both Canada), as well as Alexandr Smyshlyaev (Russia), finished in the top three positions in the first qualifying section, to move on to the quarterfinal with seven other competitors. Those who had not made it through competed again, with Patrick Deneen (USA) topping the leaderboard in the second qualifying section. The final consisted of three rounds, with the top 12 of the first round advancing to the second round, and the top six in the second advancing to the third. With a score of 26.31, Alexandre Bilodeau of Canada won the gold medal, while Mikaël Kingsbury of Canada won the silver and Alexandr Smyshlyaev of Russia finishing third, a repeat of the top three positions from the first qualifying round.

Ice hockey

- Women's tournament
  - Preliminary round – Group A
    - United States 9–0 Switzerland
    - Finland 0–3 Canada

Luge

- The first two runs of the women's singles were held. Germany's Natalie Geisenberger finished with the best time from the first two runs, with another German competitor, Tatjana Hüfner, finishing the day in second position (3rd in run 1, 2nd in run 2). Erin Hamlin of the United States was the only other competitor to reach the top three in either of the two runs, leaving her in the bronze medal position at the half-way stage of the competition.

Short track speed skating

- In the men's 1500 metres, Charles Hamelin (Canada) won the gold medal with a time of 2:14.985. Han Tianyu (China) finished second and Viktor Ahn (Russia) finished in third place. The competition began with the qualifying heats, in which the three fastest times were posted by Niels Kerstholt (Netherlands), François Hamelin (Canada) and Thibaut Fauconnet (France), in the 5th heat. In the semifinals, the quickest times were from Charles Hamelin (Canada) and Jack Whelbourne (Great Britain), in heat 3, both qualifying for Final A (the medal round). In Final B (a classification round) Sébastien Lepape (France) finished first.
- In the qualifying heats of the women's 500 metres, Fan Kexin (China), Jessica Hewitt (Canada) and Liu Qiuhong (China) recorded the three fastest times, and were among the 16 to qualify for the next round of the competition.
- In the semifinals of the women's 3000 metre relay, South Korea and Canada came first and second respectively in the first race, qualifying for the medal final. China and Italy finished in the top two in the second semifinal, also qualifying for the medal final.

Speed skating

- The Netherlands finished with all three medals in the men's 500 metres, with Michel Mulder winning the gold with a combined time of just 0.01 seconds faster than Jan Smeekens. Ronald Mulder finished the event 0.15 behind in third place.

Gold medalists
Sport	Event	Competitor(s)	NOC	Rec	Ref
Alpine skiing	Women's combined	Maria Höfl-Riesch	Germany		
Biathlon	Men's pursuit	Martin Fourcade	France		
Freestyle skiing	Men's moguls	Alex Bilodeau	Canada		
Short track speed skating	Men's 1500 metres	Charles Hamelin	Canada		
Speed skating	Men's 500 metres	Michel Mulder	Netherlands		

== Day 5 – Tuesday 11 February ==
Biathlon

- Darya Domracheva of Belarus recorded a time of 29:30.7 to win the gold medal in the women's pursuit. Tora Berger of Norway won the silver at 37.6 seconds back, and Teja Gregorin of Slovenia captured bronze at 42.0 back.

Cross-country skiing

- Norway won gold in both the men's sprint and the women's sprint, with performances by Ola Vigen Hattestad and Maiken Caspersen Falla, respectively. The other two medals in the men's sprint went to Sweden: Teodor Peterson got the silver and Emil Jönsson earned the bronze. Norway's Ingvild Flugstad Østberg also claimed silver in the women's event, while Vesna Fabjan of Slovenia finished in third.

Curling

- Men's tournament
  - Round robin, draw 3
    - Norway 9–8 Russia
    - Canada 6–7 Sweden
    - United States 4–9 China
    - Great Britain 7–6 Germany
- Women's tournament
  - Round robin, draw 2
    - South Korea 12–7 Japan
    - Russia 9–6 United States
    - Switzerland 7–6 Denmark
    - Sweden 3–9 Canada
  - Round robin, draw 3
    - South Korea 6–8 Switzerland
    - China 7–5 Russia
    - Denmark 3–8 Japan
    - Great Britain 12–3 United States
      - Great Britain equalled an Olympic record score with this victory, in which they also scored seven points in one end, something which has never been done before at the Olympics.

Figure skating

- In pairs skating, Russia's Tatiana Volosozhar and Maxim Trankov set a new world record score in the short program with 84.17 points. Germany's Aliona Savchenko and Robin Szolkowy finished in second with 79.64 points, and Russia's Ksenia Stolbova and Fedor Klimov held third with 75.21 points.

Freestyle skiing

- Canada's Dara Howell scored 94.20 points to win the gold medal in the women's slopestyle. Devin Logan finished in second with 85.40, barely finishing 0.40 behind Canada's Kim Lamarre, the bronze medal winner.

Ice hockey

- Women's tournament
  - Preliminary round – Group B
    - Germany 0–4 Sweden
    - Russia 2–1 Japan

Luge

- Germany's Natalie Geisenberger won the gold medal in the women's singles, finishing 1.139 seconds ahead of second place Tatjana Hüfner of Germany, the largest margin in an Olympic luge event since the 1964 Winter Games. Erin Hamlin of the United States finished with the bronze.

Ski jumping

- The first ever Olympic gold medal in ski jumping went to Germany's Carina Vogt for the women's normal hill individual. Austria's Daniela Iraschko-Stolz and France's Coline Mattel won the silver and bronze, respectively.

Snowboarding

- Iouri Podladtchikov (Switzerland) captured the gold in the men's halfpipe. Ayumu Hirano and Taku Hiraoka won the silver and the bronze, respectively, becoming the first Olympic snowboarding medalists from an Asian country.

Speed skating

- South Korea's Lee Sang-hwa set Olympic records in the women's 500 metres with a time of 37.28 in a race, and a combined time of 1:14.70 in two races. She also became the third woman speed skater to win multiple Olympic golds. Olga Fatkulina of Russia finished with the silver and Margot Boer of the Netherlands earned the bronze.

Gold medalists
Sport	Event	Competitor(s)	NOC	Rec	Ref
Biathlon	Women's pursuit	Darya Domracheva	Belarus		
Cross-country skiing	Men's sprint	Ola Vigen Hattestad	Norway		
Cross-country skiing	Women's sprint	Maiken Caspersen Falla	Norway		
Freestyle skiing	Women's slopestyle	Dara Howell	Canada		
Luge	Women's singles	Natalie Geisenberger	Germany		
Ski jumping	Women's normal hill individual	Carina Vogt	Germany		
Snowboarding	Men's halfpipe	Iouri Podladtchikov	Switzerland		
Speed skating	Women's 500 metres	Lee Sang-hwa	South Korea	OR	

== Day 6 – Wednesday 12 February ==
Alpine skiing

- In the women's downhill, Tina Maze of Slovenia and Dominique Gisin of Switzerland both recorded times of 1:41.57, the first time any Olympic alpine event had ended in a tie for the gold. Lara Gut of Switzerland finished 0.10 seconds behind to pick up the bronze medal.

Curling

- Men's tournament
  - Round robin, draw 4
    - Denmark 5–9 United States
    - Norway 8–5 Germany
    - China 5–4 Switzerland
  - Round robin, draw 5
    - Switzerland 2–4 Great Britain
    - Germany 7–11 China
    - Denmark 8–5 Sweden
    - Russia 4–7 Canada
- Women's tournament
  - Round robin, draw 4
    - Japan 8–4 Russia
    - United States 4–7 China
    - South Korea 4–7 Sweden
    - Canada 9–6 Great Britain

Figure skating

- The pair skating gold medal went to Russia's Tatiana Volosozhar and Maxim Trankov. They scored 152.69 in the free program, and combined with their score in the short program, 236.86 overall. Russia's Ksenia Stolbova and Fedor Klimov scored 143.47 in the free program to hold onto the silver with a combined score of 218.68. China's Pang Qing and Tong Jian came third in the free program with a score of 136.58, but Germany's Aliona Savchenko and Robin Szolkowy instead took the bronze with a total score of 215.78.

Ice hockey

- Men's tournament
  - Preliminary round – Group C
    - Czech Republic 2–4 Sweden
    - Latvia 0–1 Switzerland
- Women's tournament
  - Preliminary round – Group A
    - Switzerland 3–4 OT Finland
    - Canada 3–2 United States

Luge

- The doubles event saw Tobias Wendl and Tobias Arlt (Germany) finishing both runs with the fastest times, thus winning the gold with a combined time of 1:38.933. Andreas Linger and Wolfgang Linger (Austria) finished both runs in the second fastest time, finishing second overall. Brothers Andris and Juris Šics (Latvia) finished in third.

Nordic combined

- Eric Frenzel (Germany) won the gold medal in the individual normal hill/10 km. Frenzel recorded the farthest distance (103.0m) in the ski jumping section of the event, with Akito Watabe (Japan) and Evgenii Klimov (Russia) finishing second and third, respectively. The fastest time in the cross-country section was posted by Alessandro Pittin (Italy), but with the combined scores, Frenzel and Watabe were able to stay in the gold and silver positions, respectively. Magnus Krog (Norway) took with the bronze.

Snowboarding

- In the women's halfpipe, Kaitlyn Farrington (USA) won the gold with a score of 91.75, while Torah Bright (Australia) finished second, just 0.25 points behind, and Kelly Clark (USA) finished third with a score of 90.75. The competition began with the qualifying round, with Clark winning Heat 1 with a score of 95.00, and Bright winning the second heat, scoring 93.00. Along with four others, they advanced to the final. The next six best placed athletes in each heat qualified for the semifinal, with Farrington scoring 87.50 to qualify for the final along with five others.

Speed skating

- In the men's 1000 metres, the Netherlands continued their dominance of the speed skating events by picking up another two medals. Stefan Groothuis finished first, with his time of 1:08.39, a track record. Michel Mulder finished third. The silver medal, though, went to Canadian Denny Morrison, just 0.04 seconds behind the leader.

Gold medalists
Sport	Event	Competitor(s)	NOC	Rec	Ref
Alpine skiing	Women's downhill	Tina Maze	Slovenia		
Alpine skiing	Women's downhill	Dominique Gisin	Switzerland		
Figure skating	Pair skating	Tatiana Volosozhar; Maxim Trankov	Russia		
Luge	Doubles	Tobias Arlt; Tobias Wendl	Germany		
Nordic combined	Individual normal hill/10 km	Eric Frenzel	Germany		
Snowboarding	Women's halfpipe	Kaitlyn Farrington	United States		
Speed skating	Men's 1000 metres	Stefan Groothuis	Netherlands		

== Day 7 – Thursday 13 February ==
Biathlon

- The men's individual gold medal went to Martin Fourcade (France), who had a time of 49:31.7. Erik Lesser (Germany) finished with no penalties, in a time of 49:43.9, for the silver medal, and Evgeniy Garanichev (Russia) finishing third at 50:06.2.

Cross-country skiing

- In the women's 10 km classical, Justyna Kowalczyk (Poland) finished first with a time of 28:17.8, with Charlotte Kalla (Sweden) 18.4 seconds behind in second place. Therese Johaug (Norway) finished third.

Curling

- Men's tournament
  - Round robin, draw 6
    - Switzerland 6–7 Russia
    - Canada 7–6 Denmark
    - Norway 4–5 Sweden
    - Great Britain 5–3 United States
- Women's tournament
  - Round robin, draw 5
    - Canada 8–5 Denmark
    - China 7–8 Great Britain
    - Switzerland 8–9 Sweden
  - Round robin, draw 6
    - Sweden 7–6 Denmark
    - Russia 4–8 South Korea
    - Switzerland 5–8 Canada
    - Japan 6–8 United States

Figure skating

- Yuzuru Hanyu (Japan) led the men's singles short program with a score of 101.45, becoming the first skater to break the 100-point mark in the short program. Patrick Chan (Canada) finished the short program in second, with a score of 97.52, and Javier Fernández (Spain) finished third. Overall, 24 athletes advanced to the free skating section of the event.

Freestyle skiing

- All three medals of the men's slopestyle were won by Americans. In the qualification round, Joss Christensen (USA) scored 93.2, with Andreas Håtveit (Norway) finishing second, and James Woods (Great Britain) finished third. The top 12 athletes advanced to the final, where Christensen scored 95.80 to win the gold, American Gus Kenworthy took the silver, and Nick Goepper of USA finished third.

Ice hockey

- Men's tournament
  - Preliminary round – Group A
    - Russia 5–2 Slovenia
    - Slovakia 1–7 United States
  - Preliminary round – Group B
    - Finland 8–4 Austria
    - Canada 3–1 Norway
- Women's tournament
  - Preliminary round – Group B
    - Japan 0–4 Germany
    - Sweden 1–3 Russia

Luge

- The team relay gold medal went to the German team, consisting of Natalie Geisenberger, Felix Loch and Tobias Wendl / Tobias Arlt, with a total time of 2:45.649. The Russian team (Tatiana Ivanova, Albert Demchenko and Alexander Denisyev / Vladislav Antonov) finished second, with Latvia (Elīza Tīruma, Mārtiņš Rubenis and Andris / Juris Šics) picking up the bronze medal.

Short track speed skating

- The women's 500 metres gold medal went to Li Jianrou of China. At the start of the day, the fastest times in the quarterfinals came from Fan Kexin (China), Park Seung-Hi (South Korea) and Elise Christie (Great Britain), with eight athletes advancing to the semifinals overall. The first semifinal was then won by Park Seung-Hi (South Korea), with Elise Christie (Great Britain) winning the second semifinal. The top two in each semifinal advanced to Final A (the medal round), with the other four athletes moving on to Final B (to determine 5th place and below). In Final A, Li Jianrou (China) finished first, in a time of 45.263. Elise Christie (Great Britain) finished the race second, but was later given a penalty, moving her down to 8th position overall. Thus, Arianna Fontana (Italy) finished with the silver medal, and Park Seung-Hi finished with the bronze. In Final B, Liu Quihong (China) finished first in a time of 44.188, moving her up to 4th place overall as a result of Christie's penalty.
- The men's 5000 metre relay semifinals were held. The first semifinal was won by the Netherlands team, consisting of Daan Breeuwsma, Niels Kerstholt, Sjinkie Knegt and Freek van der Wart, in a time of 6:45.385. The second semifinal was won in a faster time of 6:44.331, by Russia (Viktor Ahn, Semen Elistratov, Vladimir Grigorev and Ruslan Zakharov). China, Kazakhstan and USA, as well as these two teams, will compete in Final A, with Italy, Canada and South Korea competing in Final B.
- In the heats of the men's 1000 metres, the fastest times being posted by Charle Cournoyer (Canada) and Wu Dajing (China). The top two from each of the eight heats advanced to the quarterfinals.

Skeleton

- The first two runs of the women's skeleton event were held. Lizzy Yarnold (Great Britain) established a track record (58.43) in the first run, finishing the day with the fastest time. Noelle Pikus-Pace (USA) finished the day in second, whilst Elena Nikitina (Russia) set a new start record (4.89), finishing the day in third.

Speed skating

- In the women's 1000 metres, Zhang Hong (China) set a new track record, taking the gold medal with a time of 1:14.02. Ireen Wüst and Margot Boer (both Netherlands) finished second and third.

Gold medalists
Sport	Event	Competitor(s)	NOC	Rec	Ref
Biathlon	Men's individual	Martin Fourcade	France		
Cross-country skiing	Women's 10 km classical	Justyna Kowalczyk	Poland		
Freestyle skiing	Men's slopestyle	Joss Christensen	United States		
Luge	Team relay	Natalie Geisenberger; Felix Loch; Tobias Wendl / Tobias Arlt	Germany		
Short track speed skating	Women's 500 metres	Li Jianrou	China		
Speed skating	Women's 1000 metres	Zhang Hong	China		

== Day 8 – Friday 14 February ==
Alpine skiing

- Sandro Viletta (Switzerland) won the gold in the men's combined with the fastest overall time, 2:45.20, with Ivica Kostelić (Croatia) finishing second and Christof Innerhofer (Italy) taking the bronze. Kjetil Jansrud (Norway) finished with the fastest downhill time (1:53.24), with Adam Žampa (Slovakia) recording the fastest slalom time (50.11).

Biathlon

- In the women's individual, Darya Domracheva (Belarus) finished the race in 43:19.6 (with 1 penalty), to pick up the gold medal. Selina Gasparin (Switzerland) finished second with no penalties, as did Nadezhda Skardino (Belarus) in third place.

Cross-country skiing

- In the men's 15 km classical, Dario Cologna (Switzerland) finished in 38:29.7 to secure the gold medal, with Johan Olsson and Daniel Richardsson (both Sweden) finishing second and third.

Curling

- Men's tournament
  - Round robin, draw 7
    - Sweden 6–5 China
    - United States 8–5 Germany
    - Canada 10–4 Norway
  - Round robin, draw 8
    - Great Britain 8–6 Denmark
    - Russia 7–6 United States
    - China 7–5 Norway
    - Switzerland 7–8 Germany
- Women's tournament
  - Round robin, draw 7
    - South Korea 3–11 China
    - Great Britain 12–3 Japan
      - Great Britain equalled an Olympic record with this result, a feat they had also achieved in draw 3.
    - United States 2–9 Denmark
    - Russia 6–3 Switzerland

Figure skating

- In the men's singles, Yuzuru Hanyu (Japan) won the gold, finished first in the free skating with a score of 178.64, and a score of 280.09 overall. Patrick Chan (Canada) and Denis Ten (Kazakhstan) posted the next best scores in the free skating, earning them silver and bronze, respectively.

Freestyle skiing

- In the women's aerials, Alla Tsuper (Belarus) won the gold medal. The day began with the first qualifying round, with Ashley Caldwell (USA) finishing with a score of 101.5, and Li Nina (China) and Danielle Scott (Australia) in second and third. Three other athletes advanced to the finals. The other athletes competed in the second qualifying round, with Lydia Lassila (Australia) finishing first with a score of 90.65. Her and five others moved on to the finals. In the first final, Alla Tsuper (Belarus) finished with the highest score (99.18), with the top eight athletes moving on. In the second final, Xu Mengtao (China) posted a score of 101.08, moving on to the final round along with three others. Tsuper then picked up the gold medal with a score of 98.01 in the final round, with Xu Mengtao taking the silver and Lassila the bronze.

Ice hockey

- Men's tournament
  - Preliminary round – Group B
    - Canada 6–0 Austria
    - Norway 1–6 Finland
  - Preliminary round – Group C
    - Czech Republic 4–2 Latvia
    - Sweden 1–0 Switzerland

Skeleton

- In the women's event, Lizzy Yarnold finished with the gold medal, retaining the medal for Great Britain, in a total time of 3:52.89. 0.97 seconds behind was Noelle Pikus-Pace (USA), with Elena Nikitina (Russia) in third. Yarnold continued her form from the first two runs, to finish the third run with the fastest time, beating her own track record from run one. Olga Potylitsina (Russia) completed the third run in the second fastest time, with Noelle Pikus-Pace (USA) third. In the fourth and final run, Lizzy Yarnold (Great Britain) again finished with the fastest time, with Sarah Reid and Mellisa Hollingsworth (both Canada) both recording identical times for second place in this run.

Ski jumping

- In the men's large hill individual qualification round, Michael Hayböck (Austria) finished with a total score of 124.8. Daiki Ito and Reruhi Shimizu (both Japan) finished second and third. The top 40 athletes advanced to the next round.

Gold medalists
Sport	Event	Competitor(s)	NOC	Rec	Ref
Alpine skiing	Men's combined	Sandro Viletta	Switzerland		
Biathlon	Women's individual	Darya Domracheva	Belarus		
Cross-country skiing	Men's 15 km classical	Dario Cologna	Switzerland		
Figure skating	Men's singles	Yuzuru Hanyu	Japan		
Freestyle skiing	Women's aerials	Alla Tsuper	Belarus		
Skeleton	Women's	Lizzy Yarnold	Great Britain		

== Day 9 – Saturday 15 February ==
Alpine skiing

- In the women's super-G, Anna Fenninger (Austria) won the gold with a time of 1:25.52, while Maria Höfl-Riesch (Germany) was 0.55 behind to win the silver and Nicole Hosp (Austria) was 0.66 behind to win the bronze.

Cross-country skiing

- The women's 4 x 5 km relay gold medal was awarded to Sweden. Led by Charlotte Kalla's last leg of 12:10.4, she, Ida Ingemarsdotter, Emma Wikén and Anna Haag recorded a total time of 53:02.7. Finland (Anne Kyllönen, Aino-Kaisa Saarinen, Kerttu Niskanen and Krista Lähteenmäki) finished in second at 0.5 seconds behind, and Germany (Nicole Fessel, Stefanie Böhler, Claudia Nystad and Denise Herrmann) in third at 0.9 behind, but 44.1 seconds ahead of fourth placed France.

Curling

- Men's tournament
  - Round robin, draw 9
    - Sweden 8–4 Germany
    - Canada 7–5 Great Britain
    - Denmark 3–9 Switzerland
    - Russia 6–9 China
- Women's tournament
  - Round robin, draw 8
    - Canada 8–6 Japan
    - China 7–6 Sweden
    - Great Britain 10–8 South Korea
  - Round robin, draw 9
    - Canada 5–3 Russia
    - United States 6–7 Sweden
    - Great Britain 6–8 Switzerland
    - Denmark 9–6 China

Ice hockey

- Men's tournament
  - Preliminary round – Group A
    - Slovakia 1–3 Slovenia
    - United States 3–2 (GWS) Russia
  - Preliminary round – Group C
    - Sweden 5–3 Latvia
    - Switzerland 1–0 Czech Republic
- Women's tournament
  - Play-offs – Quarterfinals
    - Finland 2–4 Sweden
    - Switzerland 2–0 Russia

Short track speed skating

- The women's 1500 metres gold medal went to Zhou Yang (China), while Shim Suk-Hee (South Korea) took silver and Arianna Fontana (Italy) the bronze. At the start of the day, the top three from each of the six heats qualified for the semifinals. The three winning athletes in heat four produced the fastest times, with Jorien ter Mors (Netherlands) recording the fastest with a time of 2:21.626. Elise Christie (Great Britain) was penalised for the second time of the Games, with a DNF, for missing the finish line by about 1 cm, despite appearing to win her heat. In the semifinals, the top two in each of the three races qualified for Final A (medal round), while the next two qualified for Final B (qualification round); Zhou Yang recorded the fastest time (2:18.825). In Final A, Zhou Yang finished first in 2:19.140 with Shim Suk-Hee finishing second at 2:19.239 and Arianna Fontana third at 2:19.416. Valérie Maltais recorded the fastest time in Final B (2:24.711) to place in 6th overall.
- In the men's 1000 metres, Viktor Ahn of Russia finished Final A (medal round) with a time of 1:25.325 to win the gold medal. Russian Vladimir Grigorev earned the silver at 1:25.399 and Dutch Sjinkie Knegt got the bronze at 1:25.611. The day began with the quarterfinals, where the top two from each of the four races advanced to the semifinals; the fastest time was recorded by Charles Hamelin (Canada) in heat three, 1:40.408. The top two in each semifinal then advanced to Final A, with the others competing in classification round Final B. Viktor Ahn recorded the best time (1:24.102) in the second semifinal. Han Tianyu (China) won Final B with a time of 1:29.334 to finish 5th overall.

Skeleton

- The final two runs (runs 3 and 4) of the men's event took place. Aleksandr Tretyakov (Russia) finished with the gold medal with a total time of 3:44.29. Just coming 0.81 seconds behind, Martins Dukurs became the first athlete from Latvia to win two silver medals (previously winning the silver in the same event during the 2010 Olympics). Matthew Antoine of the United States took the bronze. Dukurs recorded the fastest time in the third run at 56.26 while Tretyakov led with 56.02 seconds in the fourth run.

Ski jumping

- In the men's large hill individual, Poland's Kamil Stoch earned his second gold medal in the 2014 Olympics, recording an overall score of 278.7 in the two rounds of the final. Japan's Noriaki Kasai was second at 277.4 overall and Slovenia's Peter Prevc was third overall at 274.8. Stoch led the first round with 143.4 points. Prevc led the final round with 140.3 points, but dropped to the bronze medal because he finished fourth in the first round.

Speed skating

- In the men's 1500 metres, Zbigniew Bródka of Poland finished just 0.003 seconds in front of Koen Verweij of the Netherlands to win the gold medal, while Canada's Denny Morrison took the bronze at 0.022 seconds behind. The track record was broken three times during the day, first by Mark Tuitert (Netherlands) in the 13th pair with a time of 1:45.42, then by Denny Morrison (Canada) by 0.2 seconds in the 13th pair, and finally by Bródka in the 17th pair, en route to his gold medal win, with a time of 1:45.006.

Gold medalists
Sport	Event	Competitor(s)	NOC	Rec	Ref
Alpine skiing	Women's super-G	Anna Fenninger	Austria		
Cross-country skiing	Women's 4 × 5 km relay	Ida Ingemarsdotter; Emma Wikén; Anna Haag; Charlotte Kalla	Sweden		
Short track speed skating	Men's 1000 metres	Viktor Ahn	Russia		
Short track speed skating	Women's 1500 metres	Zhou Yang	China		
Skeleton	Men's	Aleksandr Tretyakov	Russia		
Ski jumping	Men's large hill individual	Kamil Stoch	Poland		
Speed skating	Men's 1500 metres	Zbigniew Bródka	Poland		

== Day 10 – Sunday 16 February ==
Alpine skiing

- The men's super-G gold medal was awarded to Kjetil Jansrud of Norway with a time of 1:18.14. Andrew Weibrecht of the United States finished 0.30 seconds back to earn the silver. Canadian Jan Hudec and American Bode Miller tied for the bronze medal at 0.53 seconds back.

Biathlon

- The men's mass start race was postponed to the following morning due to thick fog.

Bobsleigh

- In the two-man event, the Russian team of Alexandr Zubkov and Alexey Voyevoda recorded the fastest times in the first two runs. Their time of 56.25 in the first run was a track record.

Cross-country skiing

- In the men's 4 × 10 km relay, the Swedish team of Lars Nelson, Daniel Richardsson, Johan Olsson and Marcus Hellner led throughout most of the race to win the gold. The silver went to Russia and the bronze went to France.

Curling

- Men's tournament
  - Round robin, draw 10
    - United States 6–8 Canada
    - Great Britain 6–7 Norway
    - Sweden 8–4 Russia
  - Round robin, draw 11
    - Norway 5–3 Switzerland
    - China 8–9 Canada
    - Germany 3–6 Denmark
    - United States 4–6 Sweden
- Women's tournament
  - Round robin, draw 10
    - Denmark 7–4 South Korea
    - Japan 9–7 Switzerland
    - Sweden 5–4 Russia
    - United States 6–7 Canada

Figure skating

- In the ice dancing competition, Americans Meryl Davis and Charlie White set a world record score of 78.89 in the short program. The top 20 pairs advanced to the free program.

Ice hockey

- Men's tournament
  - Preliminary round – Group A
    - Russia 1–0 (GWS) Slovakia
    - Slovenia 1–5 United States
  - Preliminary round – Group B
    - Austria 3–1 Norway
    - Finland 1–2 Canada
- Women's tournament
  - 5–8th place play-offs – Semifinals
    - Finland 2–1 Germany
    - Russia 6–3 Japan

Snowboarding

- The Czech Republic's Eva Samková won the women's snowboard cross gold medal. She began the day recording the fastest time in the Seeding round. Then, after two rounds of six-person elimination races, with the top three from each race advancing, Samková finished first in the final, while Dominique Maltais of Canada won the silver, and France's Chloé Trespeuch won the bronze.

Speed skating

- The women's 1500 metres medals all went to the Netherlands. Jorien ter Mors set an Olympic record of 1:53.51 to win the gold, while Ireen Wüst took the silver at 0.58 seconds back, and Lotte van Beek finished third at 1.03 seconds back. With this medal sweep, Netherlands became the first country in history to earn three podium sweeps at the same Olympic Winter Games. This was actually a quadruple sweep, because fourth place went to the Netherlands as well, Marrit Leenstra finished fourth with time 1:56.40.

Gold medalists
Sport	Event	Competitor(s)	NOC	Rec	Ref
Alpine skiing	Men's super-G	Kjetil Jansrud	Norway		
Biathlon	Men's mass start	Postponed			
Cross-country skiing	Men's 4 × 10 km relay	Lars Nelson; Daniel Richardsson; Johan Olsson; Marcus Hellner	Sweden		
Snowboarding	Women's snowboard cross	Eva Samková	Czech Republic		
Speed skating	Women's 1500 metres	Jorien ter Mors	Netherlands	OR	

== Day 11 – Monday 17 February ==
Biathlon

- The men's mass start was postponed again to Tuesday afternoon due to more dense fog.
- In the women's mass start, Darya Domracheva (Belarus) finished with one penalty in 35:25.6 to secure the gold medal. Gabriela Soukalová (Czech Republic) finished second, with Tiril Eckhoff (Norway) third.

Bobsleigh

- In the two-man, the Russian pair of Alexandr Zubkov and Alexey Voyevoda finished with 3:45.39 overall to win the gold. They recorded the fastest times in both of the two final runs, and beat the track record in Run 3 that they had previous set in Run 1 of the event. Switzerland's team of Beat Hefti and Alex Baumann took the silver, and Americans Steven Holcomb and Steven Langton got the bronze.

Curling

- Men's tournament
  - Round robin, draw 12
    - China 6–5 Great Britain
    - Germany 7–8 Russia
    - Switzerland 6–3 United States
    - Norway 3–5 Denmark
- Women's tournament
  - Round robin, draw 11
    - Russia 6–9 Great Britain
    - South Korea 11–2 United States
    - Japan 8–5 China
  - Round robin, draw 12
    - China 6–10 Switzerland
    - Denmark 8–7 Great Britain
    - Canada 9–4 South Korea
    - Sweden 8–4 Japan

Figure skating

- The ice dancing gold medal went to Meryl Davis and Charlie White, the first Americans to win the gold in this event. Canadians Tessa Virtue and Scott Moir set a world record in the free program with a score of 114.66 moments before Davis and White broke it with a score of 116.63. The Americans thus secured first overall with a world record score of 195.52. Virtue and Moir received the silver and Russians Elena Ilinykh and Nikita Katsalapov finished with the bronze.

Freestyle

- The men's aerials gold medal was awarded to Anton Kushnir (Belarus). The day began with the two qualification rounds. In the first qualification round, Jia Zongyang (China) and David Morris (Australia) finished with a score of 118.59 each, to progress with four other athletes to the finals. In the second qualification round, Dmitri Dashinski (Belarus) scored 117.19 to progress with five other athletes to the finals. The finals then consisted of three rounds. In the first round of the finals, Qi Guangpu (China) recorded the best score of 121.24, with the best eight remaining in the competition. Jia Zongyang (China) scored 117.70, the highest in the second round, with the top four progressing to the final round. Anton Kushnir then scored 134.50 in the final round to win gold, while David Morris took the silver with 110.41 and Jia Zongyang the bronze at 95.06.

Ice hockey

- Women's tournament
  - Final round – Semifinals
    - United States 6–1 Sweden
    - Canada 3–1 Switzerland

Ski jumping

- In the men's large hill team, Germany won the gold, Austria won the silver, and Japan won the bronze. The first round was led by the German team (Andreas Wank, Marinus Kraus, Andreas Wellinger and Severin Freund), scoring 519.0 points. The top eight teams then advanced to the final round, where the Polish team (Maciej Kot, Piotr Żyła, Jan Ziobro and Kamil Stoch) scored the highest with 522.6 points. But overall, the German team finished with a total of 1041.1 points to secure the gold medal, while Austria (Michael Hayböck, Thomas Morgenstern, Thomas Diethart and Gregor Schlierenzauer) finished second at 1038.4 overall, and Japan (Reruhi Shimizu, Taku Takeuchi, Daiki Ito and Noriaki Kasai) finished third with 1024.9.

Snowboarding

- Because of dense fog, the seeding run of the men's snowboard cross was cancelled. Instead, the seedings for the finals will be based on the latest World Cup standings. The finals were then rescheduled to Tuesday morning.

Gold medalists
Sport	Event	Competitor(s)	NOC	Rec	Ref
Biathlon	Men's mass start	Postponed			
Biathlon	Women's mass start	Darya Domracheva	Belarus		
Bobsleigh	Two-man	Alexander Zubkov; Alexey Voevoda	Russia		
Figure skating	Ice dancing	Meryl Davis; Charlie White	United States	WR	
Freestyle skiing	Men's aerials	Anton Kushnir	Belarus		
Ski jumping	Men's large hill team	Andreas Wank; Marinus Kraus; Andreas Wellinger; Severin Freund	Germany		
Snowboarding	Men's snowboard cross	Postponed			

== Day 12 – Tuesday 18 February ==
Alpine skiing

- In the women's giant slalom, Tina Maze (Slovenia) won the gold medal, with Anna Fenninger (Austria) in second, and Viktoria Rebensburg (Germany) finishing third. Maze recorded the fastest time in the first run with a time of 1:17.88. Rebensburg finished the second run with the fastest time at 1:17.90, but her overall score was 0.27 behind Maze. Fenninger also finished the second run with a faster time than Maze, but ended up with the silver with an overall score that was 0.07 behind.

Biathlon

- After two postponements, the men's mass start was finally held. Emil Hegle Svendsen (Norway) finished first with a time of 42:29.1 and no penalties. Martin Fourcade (France) finished second, with Ondřej Moravec (Czech Republic) third.

Bobsleigh

- In the two-woman competition, the American team of Elana Meyers and Lauryn Williams finished the first and second runs with the fastest times of 57.26 and 57.63, respectively. The Canadian team of Kaillie Humphries and Heather Moyse finished the day in second place, with the second American team of Jamie Greubel and Aja Evans in third.

Curling

- Men's tournament
  - Tiebreaker, to qualify for the semifinals
    - Norway 5–6 Great Britain

Freestyle

- In the men's halfpipe, David Wise (USA) won the gold medal with a score of 92.00 in the final round. Mike Riddle (Canada) finished second at 90.60, with Kevin Rolland (France) in third at 88.60. The day began with the qualification round, where the top twelve athletes advanced to the final; Justin Dorey (Canada) finished the qualification in first place with a score of 91.60 in the first run.

Ice hockey

- Men's tournament
  - Qualification playoffs
    - Slovenia 4–0 Austria
    - Russia 4–0 Norway
    - Switzerland 1–3 Latvia
    - Czech Republic 5–3 Slovakia
- Women's tournament
  - Fifth place game
    - Finland 4–0 Russia
  - Seventh place game
    - Germany 3–2 Japan

Nordic combined

- In the individual large hill/10 km, Jørgen Graabak and Magnus Moan (both Norway) finished with the gold and silver medals. Fabian Rießle (Germany) finished with the bronze. The ski jumping section was led by Eric Frenzel (Germany) with 129.0 points, and Alessandro Pittin (Italy) completed the cross-country section with the fastest time at 22:20.5, but neither Frenzel nor Pittin ranked in the top five overall.

Short track speed skating

- In the women's 1000m qualifying heats, the fastest two athletes in each heat qualified for the quarterfinals. The fastest time was recorded by Valérie Maltais (Canada) in 1:28.771 in the second heat.
- In the men's 500m qualifying heats, the fastest two athletes in each heat qualified for the quarterfinals. The fastest time was recorded by Charle Cournoyer (Canada) in 41.180 in the second heat.
- In the women's 3000 metre relay medal round, South Korea (Shim Suk-Hee, Park Seung-Hi, Kim A-Lang and Cho Ha-Ri) finished in the fastest time, 4:09.498 to win gold. Canada (Marie-Ève Drolet, Jessica Hewitt, Valérie Maltais and Marianne St-Gelais) finished second, and Italy (Arianna Fontana, Lucia Peretti, Martina Valcepina and Elena Viviani) took the bronze medal. This was preceded by the classification final, where the Russian team (Olga Belyakova, Tatiana Borodulina, Sofia Prosvirnova and Valeriya Reznik) finished in the fastest time (4:14.862).

Snowboarding

- In the men's snowboard cross, Pierre Vaultier (France) finished first in the large (medal) final to take the gold, Nikolay Olyunin (Russia) finished with the silver, and Alex Deibold (USA) captured the bronze. Because of the previous day's cancellation of the seeding rounds, all competitors were seeded in the 1/8 finals based on the World Cup standings, with the top three in each heat qualified for the quarterfinals. Alex Pullin (Australia), Lucas Eguibar (Spain), Trevor Jacob (USA), Nikolay Olyunin (Russia), Konstantin Schad (Germany), Pierre Vaultier (France), Paul Berg (Germany) and Cameron Bolton (Australia) were the eight heat winners. In the quarterfinals, the top three qualified for the semifinals. Lucas Eguibar (Spain), Nikolay Olyunin (Russia), Pierre Vaultier (France) and Cameron Bolton (Australia) won their respective quarterfinals. In the semifinals, Nikolay Olyunin (Russia) and Pierre Vaultier (France) were the two winners, with the top three from each qualifying to the large (medal) final. Lucas Eguibar (Spain) won the small final to determine 7th to 12th place.

Speed skating

- In the men's 10000 metres, the top three skaters were from the Netherlands, the fourth time they had won all three medals in a speed skating event during these Olympics. Jorrit Bergsma posted a Track and Olympic record time of 12:44.45 to win the gold. Sven Kramer finished second, with Bob de Jong finished third.

Gold medalists
Sport	Event	Competitor(s)	NOC	Rec	Ref
Alpine skiing	Women's giant slalom	Tina Maze	Slovenia		
Biathlon	Men's mass start	Emil Hegle Svendsen	Norway		
Freestyle	Men's halfpipe	David Wise	United States		
Nordic combined	Individual large hill/10 km	Jørgen Graabak	Norway		
Short track speed skating	Women's 3000 metre relay	Shim Suk-Hee; Park Seung-Hi; Kong Sang-Jeong; Cho Ha-Ri	South Korea		
Snowboarding	Men's snowboard cross	Pierre Vaultier	France		
Speed skating	Men's 10000 metres	Jorrit Bergsma	Netherlands	OR	

== Day 13 – Wednesday 19 February ==
Alpine skiing

- In the men's giant slalom, Ted Ligety (USA) took the gold, Steve Missillier (France) won the silver, and Alexis Pinturault (France) finished with the bronze. Ligety recorded the fastest time in the first run at 1:21.08. The fastest time of the second run came from Missillier at 1:23.19, but ended up being 0.48 seconds behind overall due to his 10th-place performance in the first run.

Biathlon

- In the mixed relay, the Norwegian team of Tora Berger, Tiril Eckhoff, Ole Einar Bjørndalen and Emil Hegle Svendsen finished in a combined time of 1:09:17.0, to win gold. The Czech Republic team (Veronika Vítková, Gabriela Soukalová, Jaroslav Soukup and Ondřej Moravec) finished second at 32.6 seconds behind, and Italy (Dorothea Wierer, Karin Oberhofer, Dominik Windisch and Lukas Hofer) finished third at 58.2 seconds behind.

Bobsleigh

- In the two-woman competition, the Canadian pair of Kaillie Humphries and Heather Moyse won the gold medal, finished both the third and fourth runs with the fastest times. The silver and bronze medals went to two American teams: Elana Meyers and Lauryn Williams came in second, and Jamie Greubel and Aja Evans in third.

Cross-country skiing

- In the men's team sprint semifinals, the top two in each heat qualified for the final, with the fastest other six also advancing. Iivo Niskanen and Sami Jauhojärvi (Finland) finished with the fastest time, 23:26.13. Then in the final, the same pair recorded a time of 23:14.89 to win the gold medal. Maxim Vylegzhanin and Nikita Kriukov (Russia) finished second, with Emil Jönsson and Teodor Peterson (Sweden) in third.
- In the women's team sprint semifinals, the top two in each heat qualified for the final, with the fastest other six also advancing. Aino-Kaisa Saarinen and Kerttu Niskanen (Finland) finished with the fastest time, 16:42.15. Then in the final, the Norwegian pair of Ingvild Flugstad Østberg and Marit Bjørgen finished with the gold medal. Aino-Kaisa Saarinen and Kerttu Niskanen finished second, with Ida Ingemarsdotter and Stina Nilsson (Sweden) third.

Curling

- Men's tournament
  - Semifinals
    - Sweden 5–6 Great Britain
    - Canada 10–6 China
- Women's tournament
  - Semifinals
    - Great Britain 4–6 Canada
    - Sweden 7–5 Switzerland

Figure skating

- In the ladies' singles short program, Yuna Kim (South Korea) recorded the highest score of 74.92. Adelina Sotnikova (Russia) scored 74.64, with Carolina Kostner (Italy) finishing the day third. The top 24 athletes advanced to the free skate section of the competition.

Ice hockey

- Men's tournament
  - Quarterfinals
    - Sweden 5–0 Slovenia
    - Finland 3–1 Russia
    - Canada 2–1 Latvia
    - United States 5–2 Czech Republic

Snowboarding

- In the men's parallel giant slalom, Andrey Sobolev and Vic Wild (both Russia) posted the fastest two combined times in qualification round, with the top sixteen athletes qualifying for the elimination round. The closest two races in the 1/8 finals and quarterfinals were both won by Nevin Galmarini (Switzerland), who beat Benjamin Karl (Austria) by 0.10 seconds, and Rok Marguč (Slovenia) by 0.09 seconds, respectively. But Wild beat Galmarini in the gold medal final by 2.14 seconds. Meanwhile, Žan Košir (Slovenia) beat Patrick Bussler (Germany) by 2.26 seconds in the bronze medal final.
- In the women's parallel giant slalom, Tomoka Takeuchi (Japan) and Patrizia Kummer (Switzerland) finished with the fastest two combined times in qualification round, with the top sixteen athletes qualifying for the elimination rounds. In the 1/8 finals, the closest race was between Ekaterina Ilyukhina (Russia) and Caroline Calvé (Canada), with the latter winning by 0.03 seconds. In the semifinals, Ina Meschik (Austria) and Alena Zavarzina (Russia) were both disqualified from their respective races; Zavarzina then beat Meschik in the bronze medal final. In the gold medal final, Patrizia Kummer beat Tomoka Takeuchi by 7.32 seconds.
- With Alena Zavarzina winning the bronze medal in the women's competition, and Vic Wild winning gold in his race, it meant that a married couple both won medals on the same day, within a few minutes of each other.

Speed skating

- In the women's 5000 metres, Martina Sáblíková (Czech Republic) captured the gold, setting a new track record of 6:51.54. Ireen Wüst and Carien Kleibeuker (both of the Netherlands) finished second and third, respectively.

Gold medalists
Sport	Event	Competitor(s)	NOC	Rec	Ref
Alpine skiing	Men's giant slalom	Ted Ligety	United States		
Biathlon	Mixed relay	Tora Berger; Tiril Eckhoff; Ole Einar Bjørndalen; Emil Hegle Svendsen	Norway		
Bobsleigh	Two-woman	Kaillie Humphries; Heather Moyse	Canada		
Cross-country skiing	Men's team sprint	Iivo Niskanen; Sami Jauhojärvi	Finland		
Cross-country skiing	Women's team sprint	Marit Bjørgen; Ingvild Flugstad Østberg	Norway		
Snowboarding	Men's parallel giant slalom	Vic Wild	Russia		
Snowboarding	Women's parallel giant slalom	Patrizia Kummer	Switzerland		
Speed skating	Women's 5000 metres	Martina Sáblíková	Czech Republic		

== Day 14 – Thursday 20 February ==
Curling

- Women's tournament
  - Bronze medal game
    - Great Britain 6–5 Switzerland
      In the 10th end, Eve Muirhead's last shot landed on button to give Great Britain the one-point victory.
  - Gold medal game
    - Canada 6–3 Sweden
      Canada completed the tournament undefeated, as they stole the 9th end for two points after Sweden's Maria Prytz's final shot bumped her own team's stone out of the button. Canada then took out enough of Sweden's stones in the 10th end to force their opponents to concede the game.

Figure skating

- In the ladies' singles, Adelina Sotnikova became the first Russian woman to win an Olympic gold medal in figure skating, leading the free program with 149.95 points and 224.59 overall. Yuna Kim of South Korea took the silver after recording 144.19 points in the free program and 219.11 overall. Italy's Carolina Kostner finished with the bronze at 74.12 in the free program and 216.73 overall.

Freestyle skiing

- All three medals in the men's ski cross went to France: Jean-Frédéric Chapuis finished first in the final to take the gold, Arnaud Bovolenta won the silver, and Jonathan Midol received the bronze. The day began with the seeding round, where Victor Öhling Norberg of Sweden recorded the fastest time of 1:15.59. The 32 seeds then competed in four-person elimination races, with the top two from each race advancing to the next round.
- In the women's halfpipe, Maddie Bowman (USA) won the gold medal with a score of 89.00 in the final round. Marie Martinod (France) finished second at 85.40, with Ayana Onozuka (Japan) in third at 83.20. The day began with the qualification round, where the top twelve athletes advanced to the final; Martinod finished the qualification in first place with a score of 88.40 in the second run.

Ice hockey

- Women's tournament
  - Bronze medal game
    - Switzerland 4–3 Sweden
      Switzerland overcame a two-goal deficit, scoring four straight goals in the third period.
  - Gold medal game
    - Canada 3–2 (OT) United States
      Canada scored two goals in the final 3:26 of regulation to force overtime. Marie-Philip Poulin then scored the game-winner 8:10 into the extra period.

Nordic combined

- In the team large hill/4 × 5 km, the Norwegian team of Magnus Moan, Magnus Krog, Jørgen Graabak and Håvard Klemetsen led the cross-country section with a time of 46:48.5, and recorded 47:13.5 overall, to win the gold medal. Germany (Fabian Rießle, Björn Kircheisen, Johannes Rydzek and Eric Frenzel) led the ski jumping section with 481.7 points, but fell to 0.3 seconds behind overall to take the silver. Austria (Lukas Klapfer, Christoph Bieler, Mario Stecher, Bernhard Gruber) won the bronze.

Gold medalists
Sport	Event	Competitor(s)	NOC	Rec	Ref
Curling	Women's tournament	Jennifer Jones; Kaitlyn Lawes; Jill Officer; Dawn McEwen; Kirsten Wall	Canada		
Figure skating	Ladies' singles	Adelina Sotnikova	Russia		
Freestyle skiing	Men's ski cross	Jean-Frédéric Chapuis	France		
Freestyle skiing	Women's halfpipe	Maddie Bowman	United States		
Ice hockey	Women's tournament	Canada women's team	Canada		
Nordic combined	Team large hill/4 × 5 km	Magnus Moan; Magnus Krog; Jørgen Graabak; Håvard Klemetsen	Norway		

== Day 15 – Friday 21 February ==
Alpine skiing

- In the women's slalom, Mikaela Shiffrin of the United States captured the gold medal, finishing with the best time in the first run at 51.92, and 1:44.54 overall. Austria's Marlies Schild had the best time in the second run at 51.11, but ended up 0.53 behind overall to finish with the silver. The bronze went to Kathrin Zettel of Austria.

Biathlon

- In the women's relay, the Ukrainian team of Vita Semerenko, Juliya Dzhyma, Valj Semerenko and Olena Pidhrushna finished first with a time of 1:10:02.5. Russia (Yana Romanova, Olga Zaitseva, Ekaterina Shumilova, Olga Vilukhina) was 26.4 seconds behind to capture the silver. Norway (Fanny Welle-Strand Horn, Tiril Eckhoff, Ann Kristin Aafeldt Flatland, Tora Berger) won the bronze.

Curling

- Men's tournament
  - Bronze medal game
    - Sweden 6–4 China
      Sweden tied the game in the 10th end following a close measurement to force an 11th end, then scored two points in the extra end after China's last shot failed to bump Sweden's stone out of the button.
  - Gold medal game
    - Great Britain 3–9 Canada
      Canada won their third consecutive gold medal in men's curling, scoring three points in the 3rd end, and eventually extending their lead to six points in the 8th end to force Great Britain to concede.

Freestyle skiing

- Marielle Thompson (Canada) finished first in the women's ski cross final to take the gold, Kelsey Serwa (Canada) won the silver, and Anna Holmlund (Sweden) received the bronze. The day began with the seeding round, where Serwa recorded the fastest time of 1:21.45. The 32 seeds then competed in four-person elimination races, with the top two from each race advancing to the next round.

Ice hockey

- Men's tournament
  - Final round – Semifinals
    - Sweden 2–1 Finland
    - United States 0–1 Canada

Short track speed skating

- In the women's 1000 metres, Park Seung-hi of South Korea finished Final A (medal round) with a time of 1:30.761 to win the gold medal. Fan Kexin of China earned the silver at 1:30.811 and Shim Suk-hee of South Korea got the bronze at 1:31.027. The day began with the quarterfinals, where the top two from each of the four races advanced to the semifinals; the fastest time was recorded by Valérie Maltais (Canada) in heat two, at 1:29.037. The top two in each semifinal then advanced to Final A, with the others competing in classification round Final B. Park Seung-hi recorded the best time (1:30:202) in the semifinals. Jorien ter Mors (Netherland) won Final B with a time of 1:36.835 to finish 5th overall.
- The men's 500 metres gold medal went to Russia's Victor Ahn, Wu Dajing of China took the silver, and Charle Cournoyer of Canada received the bronze. At the start of the day, the fastest time in the quarterfinals came from Wu Dajing, with eight athletes advancing to the semifinals overall. The first semifinal was then won by Wu Dajing, with Viktor Ahn winning the second semifinal. The top two in each semifinal then advanced to the medal round. Liang Wenhao of China finished last the medal round, thus falling to fourth place overall.
- In the men's 5000 metre relay, the Russian team of Viktor Ahn, Semen Elistratov, Vladimir Grigorev, and Ruslan Zakharov won the gold medal, setting an Olympic record of 6:42.100 in the medal round. This was preceded by them posting the best time in the semifinals at 6:44.331. The United States (Eddy Alvarez, J. R. Celski, Chris Creveling, Jordan Malone) won the silver. And the bronze went to Chen Dequan, Han Tianyu, Shi Jingnan, and Wu Dajing of China.

Speed skating

- The men's team pursuit quarterfinals and semifinals were held, setting up a gold medal final between the Netherlands and South Korea, and a bronze medal final between Poland and Canada. The best time recorded during the day was the Netherlands, who finished at 3:40.79 to defeat Poland in the semifinals.
- The women's team pursuit quarterfinals were held. The Netherlands, Japan, Russia and Poland advanced to the semifinals. The best time recorded during the day was the Netherlands, who set an Olympic record of 2:58.61 to defeat the United States.

Gold medalists
Sport	Event	Competitor(s)	NOC	Rec	Ref
Alpine skiing	Women's slalom	Mikaela Shiffrin	United States		
Biathlon	Women's relay	Vita Semerenko; Juliya Dzhyma; Valj Semerenko; Olena Pidhrushna	Ukraine		
Curling	Men's tournament	Brad Jacobs; Ryan Fry; E. J. Harnden; Ryan Harnden; Caleb Flaxey	Canada		
Freestyle skiing	Women's ski cross	Marielle Thompson	Canada		
Short track speed skating	Women's 1000 metres	Park Seung-hi	South Korea		
Short track speed skating	Men's 500 metres	Viktor Ahn	Russia		
Short track speed skating	Men's 5000 metre relay	Viktor Ahn; Semen Elistratov; Vladimir Grigorev; Ruslan Zakharov	Russia	OR	

== Day 16 – Saturday 22 February ==
Alpine skiing

- In the men's slalom, Mario Matt (Austria) recorded the best time in the first run, 46.70, as well as the best overall time of 1:41.84 to win the gold medal. Austria's Marcel Hirscher finished 0.28 behind overall to win the silver, and Henrik Kristoffersen (Norway) was 0.83 behind to get the bronze. Adam Žampa of Slovakia recorded the best time in the second run, 1:43.28, but ended up in sixth place overall.

Biathlon

- The IOC announced that Evi Sachenbacher-Stehle of Germany tested positive for the banned stimulant methylhexanamine, and thus stripped her fourth-place finish in the women's mass start, as well as the German team's fourth-place result in the mixed relay.
- The gold medal in the men's relay was won by the Russian team of Alexey Volkov, Evgeny Ustyugov, Dmitry Malyshko and Anton Shipulin with a time of 1:12:15.9. Germany (Erik Lesser, Daniel Böhm, Arnd Peiffer, Simon Schempp) was 3.5 seconds behind to take the silver, and the bronze went to Austria (Christoph Sumann, Daniel Mesotitsch, Simon Eder, Dominik Landertinger) at 29.8 seconds behind.

Bobsleigh

- The first two runs of the four-man were held. In the first run, the Russian team of Alexandr Zubkov, Dmitry Trunenkov, Alexey Negodaylo and Alexey Voyevoda set a track record of 54.82.

Cross-country skiing

- All three medals in the women's 30 km freestyle went to Norway. Marit Bjørgen received the gold with a time of 1:11:05.2, Therese Johaug finished second at 2.6 back, and Kristin Størmer Steira finished third at 23.6 back.

Figure skating

- The exhibition gala was held. The 2 1/2-hour show had performances by all individual gold medalists and many others.

Ice hockey

- Men's tournament
  - Bronze medal game
    - United States 0–5 Finland
      Finland scored two goals 11 seconds apart in the second period, and then three successive goals in the third period. Goaltender Tuukka Rask stopped all 27 American shots.

Snowboarding

- In the men's parallel slalom, Vic Wild of Russia beat Žan Košir of Slovenia in the gold medal final by a difference of 0.11. The bronze medal final was won by Benjamin Karl, who beat Italy's Aaron March. The day began with the qualification round, with Vic Wild recording the fastest time at 57.96. The top 16 then advanced to the four round elimination tournament.
- In the women's parallel slalom, Austria's Julia Dujmovits beat Germany's Anke Karstens in the gold medal final by a difference of 0.12. And Amelie Kober of Germany beat Italy's Corinna Boccacini in the bronze medal final. The day began with the qualification round, with Marion Kreiner (Austria) recording the fastest time at 1:03.58. The top 16 then advanced to the four round elimination tournament.

Speed skating

- In the gold medal final of the men's team pursuit, Jan Blokhuijsen, Sven Kramer and Koen Verweij of the Netherlands set an Olympic record of 3:37.71. The South Korean team of Joo Hyong-jun, Kim Cheol-min and Lee Seung-hoon was 3.14 behind to win the silver. In the bronze medal final, Poland (Zbigniew Bródka, Konrad Niedźwiedzki and Jan Szymański) beat Canada (Mathieu Giroux, Lucas Makowsky and Denny Morrison) by 2.33.
- In the women's team pursuit semifinals and finals, the Dutch team of Jorien ter Mors, Marrit Leenstra, Ireen Wüst and Lotte van Beek set Olympic records on their way to winning the gold. They first set the record in the semifinals with a time of 2:58.43 to beat Japan (Misaki Oshigiri, Maki Tabata and Nana Takagi). The Netherlands then broke the record again with a time of 2:58.05 in the final. Poland was 7.50 behind in the final to win the silver. Russia (Olga Graf, Yekaterina Lobysheva and Yuliya Skokova) then beat Japan to win the bronze.

Gold medalists
Sport	Event	Competitor(s)	NOC	Rec	Ref
Alpine skiing	Men's slalom	Mario Matt	Austria		
Biathlon	Men's relay	Alexey Volkov; Evgeny Ustyugov; Dmitry Malyshko; Anton Shipulin	Russia		
Cross-country skiing	Women's 30 km freestyle	Marit Bjørgen	Norway		
Snowboarding	Men's parallel slalom	Vic Wild	Russia		
Snowboarding	Women's parallel slalom	Julia Dujmovits	Austria		
Speed skating	Men's team pursuit	Jan Blokhuijsen; Sven Kramer; Koen Verweij	Netherlands	OR	
Speed skating	Women's team pursuit	Jorien ter Mors; Marrit Leenstra; Ireen Wüst	Netherlands	OR	

== Day 17 – Sunday 23 February ==
Bobsleigh

- The final two runs of the four-man event were held. The Russian team of Alexandr Zubkov, Dmitry Trunenkov, Alexey Negodaylo and Alexey Voyevoda won the gold, recording the best time in the third run, 55.02, as well as the best overall time of 3:40.60. Latvia (Oskars Melbārdis, Arvis Vilkaste, Daumants Dreiškens and Jānis Strenga) finished with the silver, 0.09 seconds behind Russia overall. The United States (Steven Holcomb, Steven Langton, Curtis Tomasevicz and Christopher Fogt) took the bronze, 0.39 seconds behind. The best time recorded in the fourth run was 55.21 by the second Russian team (Alexander Kasjanov, Maxim Belugin, Ilvir Huzin and Aleksei Pushkarev), but they finished fourth overall.

Cross-country skiing

- The medals in the men's 50 km freestyle all went to Russia. Alexander Legkov finished the race at 1:46:55.2 to win the gold. A photo finish determined that Maxim Vylegzhanin finished in second, 0.7 seconds behind, and Ilia Chernousov was third, 0.8 seconds behind the leader.

Ice hockey

- Men's tournament
  - Gold medal game
    - Sweden 0–3 Canada
      Canada got goals from three different players. Goaltender Carey Price stopped all 24 Swedish shots.

Closing ceremony

- The closing ceremony began at 20:14 MSK at Fisht Olympic Stadium. It featured the traditional elements of Olympic closing ceremonies such as the parade of flags and athletes; the handover ceremony to the site of the next Winter Olympics, Pyeongchang, South Korea; and the extinguishing of the Olympic flame. During the ceremony, Russia poked fun at the opening ceremony, where one of the Olympic rings did not open; the fifth group of dancers representing the rings took longer than the others to open. It did eventually open, to cheers from the Russian audience.

Gold medalists
Sport	Event	Competitor(s)	NOC	Rec	Ref
Bobsleigh	Four-man	Alexandr Zubkov; Dmitry Trunenkov; Alexey Negodaylo; Alexey Voyevoda	Russia		
Cross-country skiing	Men's 50 km freestyle	Alexander Legkov	Russia		
Ice hockey	Men's tournament	Canada men's team	Canada		
