= 2013–14 ISU Short Track Speed Skating World Cup =

Multi-race international skating tournament that took place between 2013-2014

ISU Short Track World Cup
- Dates: 2013–14

The 2013–14 ISU Short Track Speed Skating World Cup was a multi-race tournament over a season for short track speed skating. The season began on 28 September 2013 and ended on 17 November 2013. The World Cup was organised by the ISU who also run world cups and championships in speed skating and figure skating. The 3rd and 4th legs of the world cup, held in Turin and Kolomna, acted as qualifying events for the 2014 Winter Olympics.

The World Cup consisted of just four competitions this year (rather than six) due to the 2014 Winter Olympics in Sochi.

== Calendar ==
=== Men ===
==== Shanghai ====
Date	Place	Distance	Winner	Second	Third	Reference
28 September 2013	Shanghai Oriental Sports Center	500m	Charles Hamelin (CAN)	Vladimir Grigorev (RUS)	Eduardo Alvarez (USA)	
29 September 2013	Shanghai Oriental Sports Center	1000m	Charles Hamelin (CAN)	Niels Kerstholt (NED)	Lee Han-Bin (KOR); Jordan Malone (USA)	
28 September 2013	Shanghai Oriental Sports Center	1500m	Noh Jinkyu (KOR)	Charles Hamelin (CAN)	Victor An (RUS)	
29 September 2013	Shanghai Oriental Sports Center	5000m relay	United States	South Korea	Canada	

==== Seoul ====
Date	Place	Distance	Winner	Second	Third	Reference
5 October 2013	Mokdong Ice Rink	500m	Victor An (RUS)	Wu Dajing (CHN)	Park Se-yeong (KOR)	
6 October 2013	Mokdong Ice Rink	1000m	Wu Dajing (CHN)	Victor An (RUS)	Park Se-yeong (KOR)	
5 October 2013	Mokdong Ice Rink	1500m	Charles Hamelin (CAN)	Lee Han-Bin (KOR)	Victor An (RUS)	
6 October 2013	Mokdong Ice Rink	5000m relay	Canada	United States	United Kingdom	

==== Turin ====
Date	Place	Distance	Winner	Second	Third	Reference
7 November 2013	Palaghiaccio Tazzoli Rink	500m	Charles Hamelin (CAN)	Victor An (RUS)	Olivier Jean (CAN)	
7 November 2013	Palaghiaccio Tazzoli Rink	1000m	Charles Hamelin (CAN)	Victor An (RUS)	Vladimir Grigorev (RUS)	
7 November 2013	Palaghiaccio Tazzoli Rink	1500m	Lee Han-Bin (KOR)	John-Henry Krueger (USA)	Sjinkie Knegt (NED)	
7 November 2013	Palaghiaccio Tazzoli Rink	5000m relay	Canada	Russia	Netherlands	

==== Kolomna ====
Date	Place	Distance	Winner	Second	Third	Reference
16 November 2013	Kolomna Speed Skating Centre	500m	Victor An (RUS)	Vladimir Grigorev (RUS)	Wu Dajing (CHN)	
17 November 2013	Kolomna Speed Skating Centre	1000m	Charles Hamelin (CAN)	Thibaut Fauconnet (FRA)	J. R. Celski (USA)	
16 November 2013	Kolomna Speed Skating Centre	1500m	J. R. Celski (USA)	Victor An (RUS)	Thibaut Fauconnet (FRA)	
17 November 2013	Kolomna Speed Skating Centre	5000m relay	United States	Russia	South Korea	

=== Women ===
==== Shanghai ====
Date	Place	Distance	Winner	Second	Third	Reference
28 September 2013	Shanghai Oriental Sports Center	500m	Fan Kexin (CHN)	Park Seung-Hi (KOR)	Marianne St-Gelais (CAN)	
29 September 2013	Shanghai Oriental Sports Center	1000m	Shim Suk Hee (KOR)	Kim Alang (KOR)	Li Jianrou (CHN)	
28 September 2013	Shanghai Oriental Sports Center	1500m	Shim Suk Hee (KOR)	Kim Alang (KOR)	Jorien Ter Mors (NED)	
29 September 2013	Shanghai Oriental Sports Center	3000m relay	South Korea	China	Italy	

==== Seoul ====
Date	Place	Distance	Winner	Second	Third	Reference
5 October 2013	Mokdong Ice Rink	500m	Wang Meng (CHN)	Fan Kexin (CHN)	Arianna Fontana (ITA)	
6 October 2013	Mokdong Ice Rink	1000m	Shim Suk Hee (KOR)	Park Seung-Hi (KOR)	Kim Alang (KOR)	
5 October 2013	Mokdong Ice Rink	1500m	Kim Alang (KOR)	Shim Suk Hee (KOR)	Valérie Maltais (CAN)	
6 October 2013	Mokdong Ice Rink	3000m relay	South Korea	China	Canada	

==== Turin ====
Date	Place	Distance	Winner	Second	Third	Reference
7 November 2013	Palaghiaccio Tazzoli Rink	500m	Wang Meng (CHN)	Arianna Fontana (ITA)	Fan Kexin (CHN)	
7 November 2013	Palaghiaccio Tazzoli Rink	1000m	Shim Suk Hee (KOR)	Kim Alang (KOR)	Park Seung-Hi (KOR)	
7 November 2013	Palaghiaccio Tazzoli Rink	1500m	Shim Suk Hee (KOR)	Park Seung-Hi (KOR)	Zhou Yang (CHN)	
7 November 2013	Palaghiaccio Tazzoli Rink	3000m relay	South Korea	China	Italy	

==== Kolomna ====
Date	Place	Distance	Winner	Second	Third	Reference
16 November 2013	Kolomna Speed Skating Centre	500m	Wang Meng (CHN)	Fan Kexin (CHN)	Shim Suk Hee (KOR)	
17 November 2013	Kolomna Speed Skating Centre	1000m	Arianna Fontana (ITA)	Kim Alang (KOR)	Elise Christie (GBR)	
16 November 2013	Kolomna Speed Skating Centre	1500m	Shim Suk Hee (KOR)	Valérie Maltais (CAN)	Zhou Yang (CHN)	
17 November 2013	Kolomna Speed Skating Centre	3000m relay	China	South Korea	Italy	

== World Cup standings ==
* Note – Standings are calculated on the best 3 out of 4 results for the individual distances

=== Men's 500 metres ===
After 4 of 4 events

Pos	Athlete	Points
1.	Victor An (RUS)	28000
2.	Charles Hamelin (CAN)	21678
3.	Vladimir Grigorev (RUS)	21120
4.	Wu Dajing (CHN)	14424
5.	Olivier Jean (CAN)	11532

=== Women's 500 metres ===
After 4 of 4 events

Pos	Athlete	Points
1.	Wang Meng (CHN)	30000
2.	Fan Kexin (CHN)	26000
3.	Arianna Fontana (ITA)	17677
4.	Park Seung-Hi (KOR)	13438
5.	Shim Suk-Hee (KOR)	12594

=== Men's 1000 metres ===
After 4 of 4 events

Pos	Athlete	Points
1.	Charles Hamelin (CAN)	30000
2.	Victor An (RUS)	16859
3.	Niels Kerstholt (NED)	12099
4.	Wu Dajing (CHN)	11299
5.	Han Tianyu (CHN)	10494

=== Women's 1000 metres ===
After 4 of 4 events

Pos	Athlete	Points
1.	Shim Suk-Hee (KOR)	30000
2.	Kim A-Lang (KOR)	24000
3.	Arianna Fontana (ITA)	19216
4.	Park Seung-Hi (KOR)	16497
5.	Li Jianrou (CHN)	13198

=== Men's 1500 metres ===
After 4 of 4 events

Pos	Athlete	Points
1.	Charles Hamelin (CAN)	22096
2.	Lee Han-Bin (KOR)	21277
3.	Victor An (RUS)	20800
4.	Noh Jin-Kyu (KOR)	14619
5.	Sjinkie Knegt (NED)	11520

=== Women's 1500 metres ===
After 4 of 4 events

Pos	Athlete	Points
1.	Shim Suk-Hee (KOR)	30000
2.	Kim A-Lang (KOR)	19342
3.	Zhou Yang (CHN)	16896
4.	Valérie Maltais (CAN)	16078
5.	Park Seung-Hi (KOR)	12955

=== Men's 5000 metre relay ===
After 4 of 4 events

Pos	Athlete	Points
1.	United States	28000
2.	Canada	26400
3.	Russia	21120
4.	South Korea	18496
5.	Netherlands	14797

=== Women's 3000 metre relay ===
After 4 of 4 events

Pos	Athlete	Points
1.	South Korea	30000
2.	China	26000
3.	Italy	19200
4.	Canada	16640
5.	Russia	10289

== See also ==
2014 World Short Track Speed Skating Championships
