= Short-track speed skating at the 2014 Winter Olympics =

Short track speed skating at the XXII Olympic Winter Games
- Venue: Iceberg Skating Palace; Sochi, Russia
- Dates: 10–21 February 2014
- No. of events: 8
- Competitors: 116 from 25 nations

Short track speed skating at the 2014 Winter Olympics was held at the Iceberg Skating Palace in Sochi, Russia. The eight events took place between 10–21 February 2014.

== Competition schedule ==
The following is the competition schedule for all eight events. Completed events that include the event finals are shown in bold.

All times are (UTC+4).

Date	Time	Event
10 February	13:45	Women's 3000 metre relay
10 February	13:45	Women's 500 metres
10 February	13:45	**Men's 1500 metres**
13 February	14:00	Men's 5000 metre relay
13 February	14:00	Men's 1000 metres
13 February	14:00	**Women's 500 metres**
15 February	14:00	**Women's 1500 metres**
15 February	14:00	**Men's 1000 metres**
18 February	13:30	Women's 1000 metres
18 February	13:30	Men's 500 metres
18 February	13:30	**Women's 3000 metre relay**
21 February	20:30	**Women's 1000 metres**
21 February	20:30	**Men's 500 metres**
21 February	20:30	**Men's 5000 metre relay**

== Medal summary ==
=== Medal table ===
* Host nation (Russia)

Rank	Nation	Gold	Silver	Bronze	Total
1	Russia*	3	1	1	5
2	China	2	3	1	6
3	South Korea	2	1	2	5
4	Canada	1	1	1	3
5	Italy	0	1	2	3
6	United States	0	1	0	1
7	Netherlands	0	0	1	1
Totals (7 entries)		**8**	**8**	**8**	**24**

=== Men's events ===
Event	Gold		Silver		Bronze	
500 metres	Viktor Ahn; Russia	41.312	Wu Dajing; China	41.516	Charle Cournoyer; Canada	41.617
1000 metres	Viktor Ahn; Russia	1:25.325	Vladimir Grigorev; Russia	1:25.399	Sjinkie Knegt; Netherlands	1:25.611
1500 metres	Charles Hamelin; Canada	2:14.985	Han Tianyu; China	2:15.055	Viktor Ahn; Russia	2:15.062
5000 metres relay	Russia; Viktor Ahn; Semion Elistratov; Vladimir Grigorev; Ruslan Zakharov	6:42.100; **OR**	United States; Eddy Alvarez; J. R. Celski; Christopher Creveling; Jordan Malone	6:42.371	China; Chen Dequan; Han Tianyu; Shi Jingnan; Wu Dajing	6:48.341

At 31 years and 191 days, Vladimir Grigorev became the oldest man to win a short track Olympic medal, winning silver at the 1000m event. On 21 February 2014, he won the gold in the 5000m relay, upping the oldest short track male athlete record for both medals and gold medals.

=== Women's events ===
Event	Gold		Silver		Bronze	
500 metres	Li Jianrou; China	45.263	Arianna Fontana; Italy	51.250	Park Seung-hi; South Korea	54.207
1000 metres	Park Seung-hi; South Korea	1:30.761	Fan Kexin; China	1:30.811	Shim Suk-hee; South Korea	1:31.027
1500 metres	Zhou Yang; China	2:19.140	Shim Suk-hee; South Korea	2:19.239	Arianna Fontana; Italy	2:19.416
3000 metre relay	South Korea; Shim Suk-hee; Park Seung-hi; Cho Ha-ri; Kim A-lang; Kong Sang-jeong	4:09.498	Canada; Marie-Ève Drolet; Jessica Hewitt; Valérie Maltais; Marianne St-Gelais	4:10.641	Italy; Arianna Fontana; Lucia Peretti; Martina Valcepina; Elena Viviani	4:14.014

=== Notes ===
Viktor Ahn became the first short track speedskater to win all four Olympic golds (500m, 1000m, 1500m, 5000m relay). He also became the short track speedskater with the most Olympic gold medals, with 6, winning 3 golds in 2014, and 3 in 2006 (for South Korea). With his 4 medals from 2006 and 4 from 2014, he tied Apolo Anton Ohno with the most Olympic short track medals, at 8.

== Qualification ==
A total quota of 120 athletes were allowed to compete at the Games (60 men and 60 women). Countries were assigned quotas using a combination of the four special Olympic Qualification classification that were held at two World cups in November 2013. A nation may have entered a maximum of five athletes per gender if it had qualified a relay team and three if it does not. Hosts Russia were guaranteed the full quota of 10 athletes. For the 500m, and 1000m there were 32 qualifiers, for the 1500m 36 qualifiers, and the relay 8. The ISU released quotas on 22 November 2013.

== Participating nations ==
A total of 116 athletes from 25 nations participated (the numbers of athletes are shown in parentheses). Two nations, Chinese Taipei and Lithuania made their Olympic debuts in the sport, while Hong Kong qualified its first male athlete at the Winter Olympics in this event.

- Australia (2)
- Austria (1)
- Belarus (2)
- Canada (10)
- China (10)
- Czech Republic (2)
- France (4)
- Germany (2)
- Great Britain (5)
- Hong Kong (1)
- Hungary (8)
- Israel (1)
- Italy (10)
- Japan (8)
- Kazakhstan (6)
- Latvia (1)
- Lithuania (1)
- Netherlands (10)
- Poland (1)
- Russia (10)
- Slovakia (1)
- South Korea (10)
- Chinese Taipei (1)
- Ukraine (1)
- United States (8)
