= 2014 World Short Track Speed Skating Championships =

International speed skating competition

- Venue: Maurice Richard Arena; Montreal, Quebec, Canada
- Dates: 14–17 March
- from 31 nations

The 2014 World Short Track Speed Skating Championships took place from 14 to 17 March 2014 at the Maurice Richard Arena in Montreal, Quebec, Canada. They were the 39th World Short Track Speed Skating Championships, the fifth to be held in Canada and the third to be held in Montreal.

== Results ==
The Overall World Champion is determined by adding the points received by the athletes taking part in the final of each event; points are not awarded for any races other than the event finals.

For each final race: 34 points are awarded for first place, 21 points for second place, 13 points for third place, 8 points for fourth place, 5 points for fifth place, 3 points for sixth place, 2 points for seventh place, and 1 point is awarded for eighth place. In the 3000 m super-final, an additional 5 points are awarded to the athlete who is leading the race after the first 1000 m. The relay events do not count towards the overall classification.

The athlete with the second most points wins the overall silver medal, and the next highest point scorer wins overall bronze.

=== Men ===
Event	Gold		Silver		Bronze	
Overall	Victor An; Russia	63 pts	J. R. Celski; United States	55 pts	Charles Hamelin; Canada	48 pts
500 m	Wu Dajing; China	40.526	J. R. Celski; United States	40.582	Charles Hamelin; Canada	40.623
1000 m	Victor An; Russia	1:25.446	Sjinkie Knegt; Netherlands	1:25.626	Park Se-yeong; South Korea	1:25.737
1500 m	Charles Hamelin; Canada	2:15.049	Han Tianyu; China	2:15.138	Park Se-yeong; South Korea	2:15.262
5000 m relay	Netherlands; Daan Breeuwsma; Niels Kerstholt; Sjinkie Knegt; Freek van der Wart	6:52.618	South Korea; Kim Yun-jae; Lee Han-bin; Park Se-yeong; Sin Da-woon; Lee Ho-suk	6:52.651	Great Britain; Jon Eley; Richard Shoebridge; Paul Stanley; Jack Whelbourne	6:52.716

=== Women ===
Event	Gold		Silver		Bronze	
Overall	Shim Suk-hee; South Korea	102 pts	Park Seung-hi; South Korea	73 pts	Valérie Maltais; Canada	39 pts
500 m	Park Seung-hi; South Korea	42.792	Elise Christie; Great Britain	42.870	Fan Kexin; China	42.942
1000 m	Shim Suk-hee; South Korea	1:30.488	Park Seung-hi; South Korea	1:30.597	Valérie Maltais; Canada	1:30.690
1500 m	Shim Suk-hee; South Korea	2:34.423	Kim A-lang; South Korea	2:34.717	Park Seung-hi; South Korea	2:34.838
3000 m relay	China; Fan Kexin; Han Yutong; Kong Xue; Liu Qiuhong	4:10.062	Canada; Marianne St-Gelais; Jessica Gregg; Jessica Hewitt; Valérie Maltais; Marie-Ève Drolet	4:11.568	Italy; Arianna Fontana; Cecilia Maffei; Lucia Peretti; Elena Viviani	4:32.654

== Medal table ==
* Host nation (Canada)

Rank	Nation	Gold	Silver	Bronze	Total
1	South Korea (KOR)	4	4	3	11
2	China (CHN)	2	1	1	4
3	Russia (RUS)	2	0	0	2
4	Canada (CAN)*	1	1	4	6
5	Netherlands (NED)	1	1	0	2
6	United States (USA)	0	2	0	2
7	Great Britain (GBR)	0	1	1	2
8	Italy (ITA)	0	0	1	1
Totals (8 entries)		10	10	10	30
