= Short-track speed skating at the 2014 Winter Olympics – Women's 3000 metre relay =

Women's 3000 metre relay at the XXII Olympic Winter Games
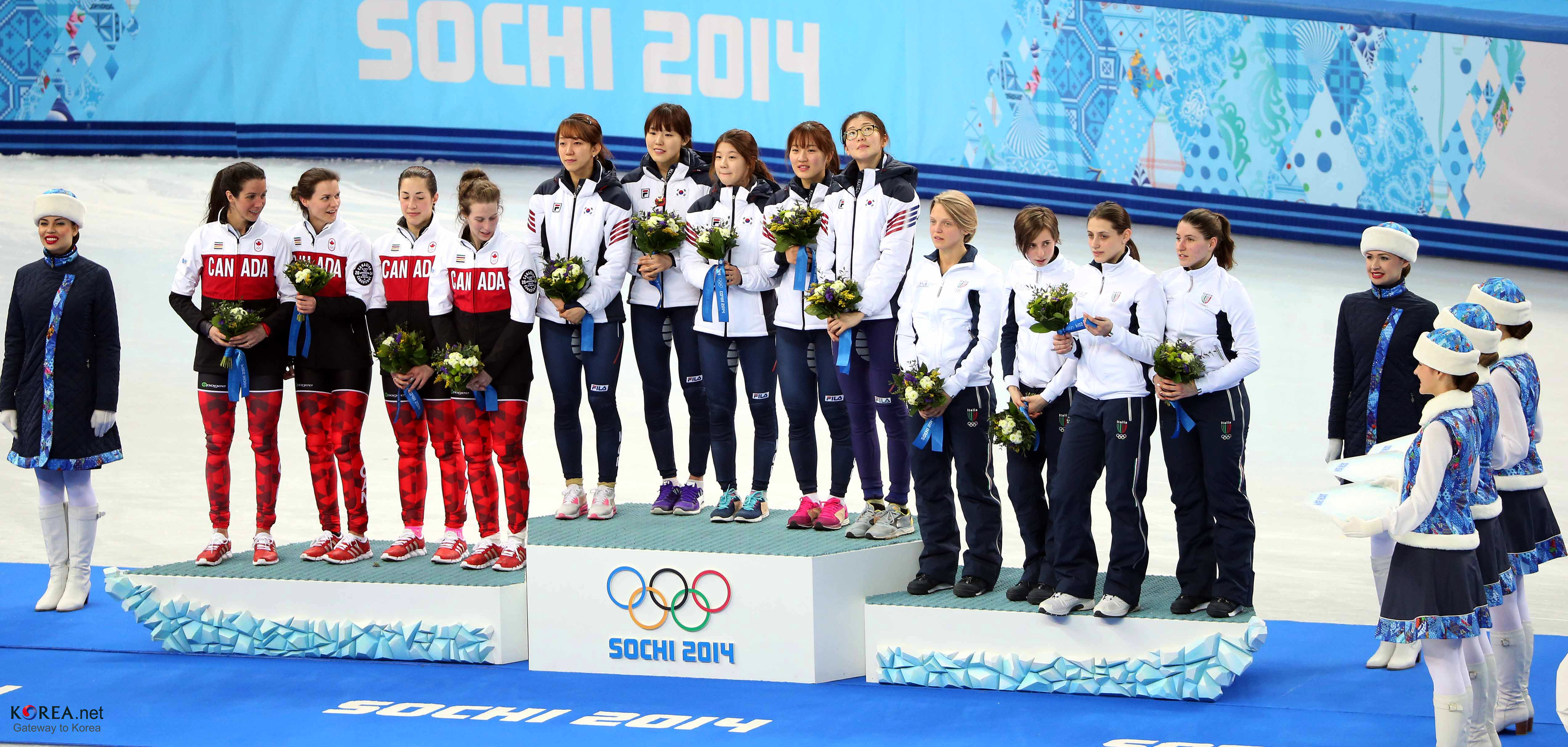
- Podium
- Venue: Iceberg Skating Palace; Sochi, Russia
- Dates: 10 February 2014 (semifinal); 18 February 2014 (final)
- Competitors: 32 from 8 nations
- Winning time: 4:09.498

Medalists
1st place, gold medalist(s)		Shim Suk-hee; Park Seung-hi; Kong Sang-jeong; Cho Ha-ri; Kim A-lang	South Korea
2nd place, silver medalist(s)		Marie-Ève Drolet; Jessica Hewitt; Valérie Maltais; Marianne St-Gelais	Canada
3rd place, bronze medalist(s)		Arianna Fontana; Lucia Peretti; Martina Valcepina; Elena Viviani	Italy

The women's 3000 metre relay in short track speed skating at the 2014 Winter Olympics was held between 10 and 18 February 2014 at the Iceberg Skating Palace in Sochi, Russia.

The semifinal was held on 10 February with the final on 18 February.

The defending Olympic Champion and World Champion was China.

== Qualification ==
Countries were assigned quotas using a combination of the four special Olympic Qualification classifications that were held at two world cups in November 2013. For this event a total of 8 nations qualified to compete.

== Results ==
=== Semifinals ===
The semifinals were held on 10 February.

Rank	Semifinal	Country	Athletes	Time	Notes
1	1	South Korea	Shim Suk-hee; Park Seung-hi; Kong Sang-jeong; Cho Ha-ri	4:08.052	QA
2	1	Canada	Marie-Ève Drolet; Jessica Hewitt; Valérie Maltais; Marianne St-Gelais	4:08.871	QA
3	1	Russia	Olga Belyakova; Tatiana Borodulina; Sofia Prosvirnova; Valeriya Reznik	4:13.938	QB
4	1	Hungary	Rózsa Darázs; Bernadett Heidum; Andrea Keszler; Szandra Lajtos	4:15.473	QB
1	2	China	Fan Kexin; Li Jianrou; Liu Qiuhong; Zhou Yang	4:09.555	QA
2	2	Italy	Arianna Fontana; Lucia Peretti; Martina Valcepina; Elena Viviani	4:11.282	QA
3	2	Japan	Ayuko Ito; Yui Sakai; Biba Sakurai; Sayuri Shimizu	4:11.913	QB
PEN	2	Netherlands	Jorien ter Mors; Sanne van Kerkhof; Yara van Kerkhof; Lara van Ruijven	PEN	

=== Finals ===
The finals were held on 18 February.

==== Final B (Classification Round) ====
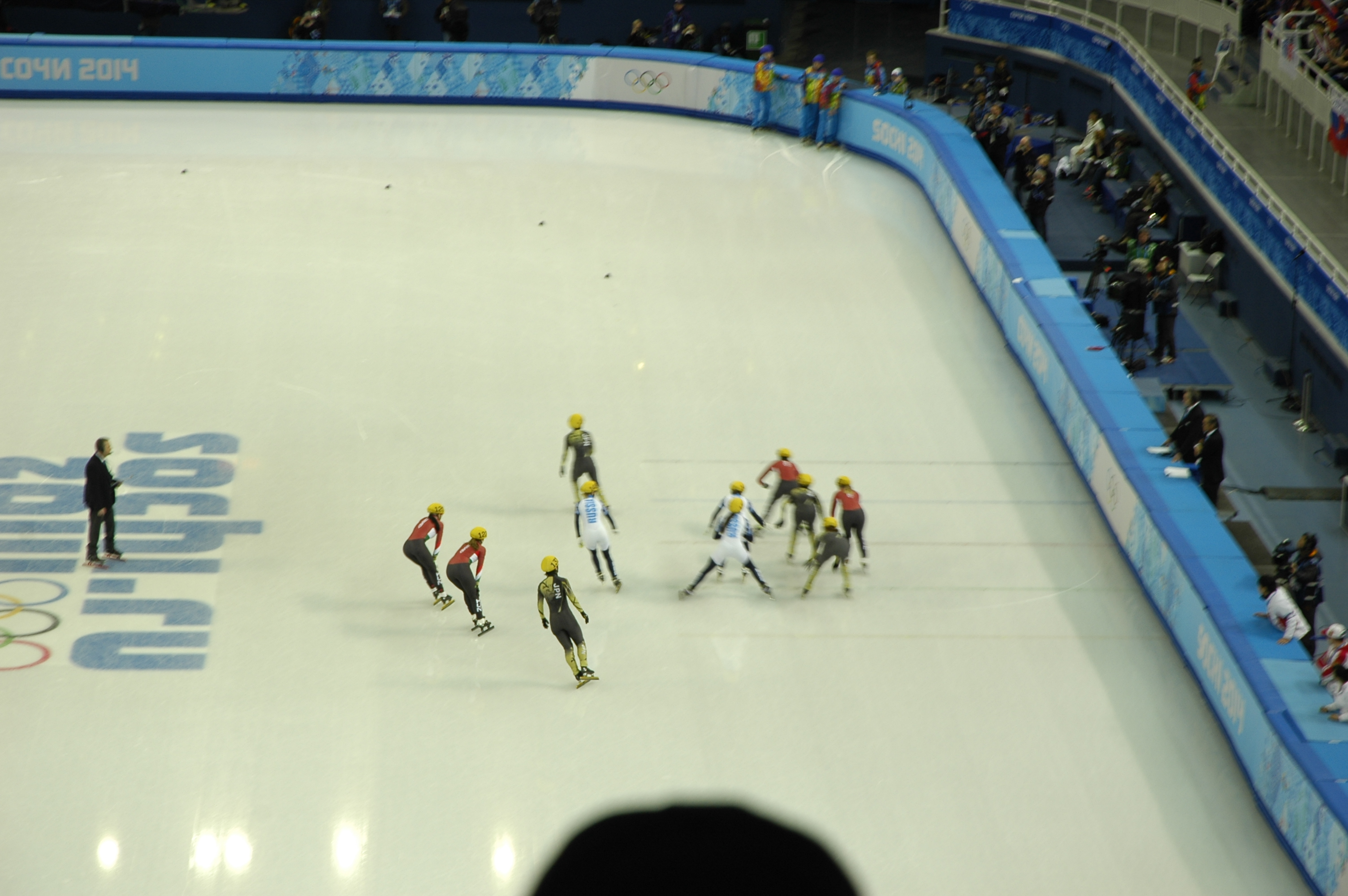
Final B

Rank	Country	Athletes	Time	Notes
4	Russia	Olga Belyakova; Tatiana Borodulina; Sofia Prosvirnova; Valeriya Reznik	4:14.862	
5	Japan	Ayuko Ito; Yui Sakai; Biba Sakurai; Sayuri Shimizu	4:15.253	
6	Hungary	Rózsa Darázs; Bernadett Heidum; Andrea Keszler; Szandra Lajtos	4:24.496	

==== Final A (Medal Round) ====
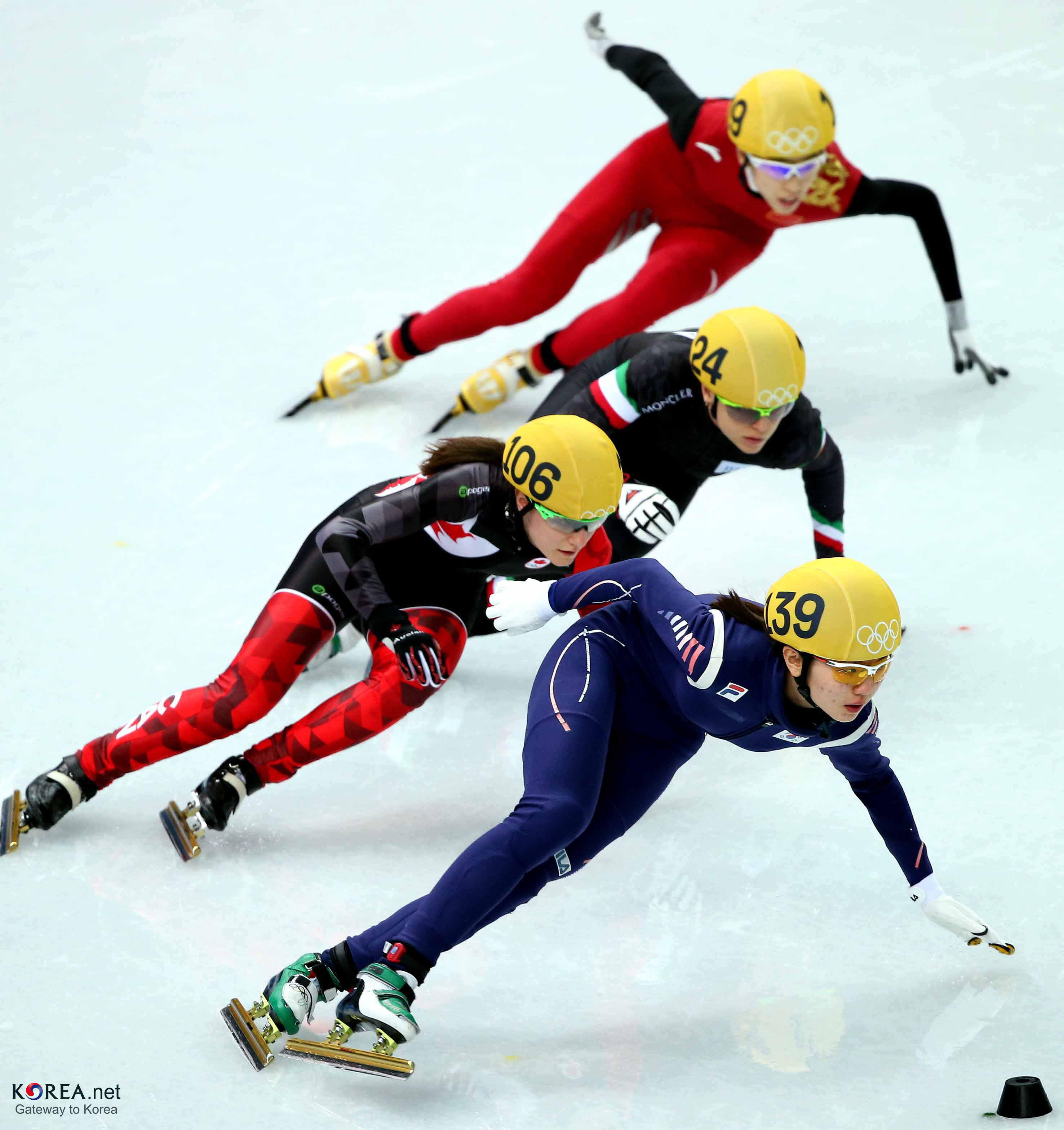
Final A

Rank	Country	Athletes	Time	Notes
1st place, gold medalist(s)	South Korea	Shim Suk-hee; Park Seung-hi; Kim A-lang; Cho Ha-ri	4:09.498	
2nd place, silver medalist(s)	Canada	Marie-Ève Drolet; Jessica Hewitt; Valérie Maltais; Marianne St-Gelais	4:10.641	
3rd place, bronze medalist(s)	Italy	Arianna Fontana; Lucia Peretti; Martina Valcepina; Elena Viviani	4:14.014	
–	China	Fan Kexin; Li Jianrou; Liu Qiuhong; Zhou Yang		PEN
