= World and Olympic records set at the 2014 Winter Olympics =

Six new World records and ten new Olympic records were set at the 2014 Winter Olympics in Sochi.

== Figure skating ==
The following new ISU best scores were set during this competition:

Event	Date	Component	Skaters	Country	Score	Ref
Team trophy	9 February	Ice Dancing - Free dance	Meryl Davis / Charlie White	United States	114.34	
Pairs skating	11 February	Short program	Tatiana Volosozhar / Maxim Trankov	Russia	84.17	
Men's singles	13 February	Short program	Yuzuru Hanyu	Japan	101.45	
Ice dancing	16 February	Short dance	Meryl Davis / Charlie White	United States	78.89	
Ice dancing	17 February	Free dance	Tessa Virtue / Scott Moir	Canada	114.66	
Ice dancing	17 February	Free dance	Meryl Davis / Charlie White	United States	116.63	
Ice dancing	17 February	Total score	Meryl Davis / Charlie White	United States	195.52	

== Short track speed skating ==
Event	Date	Round	Athlete	Country	Time	Record	Ref
Women's 1000 metres	18 February	Heat 3	Valérie Maltais	Canada	1:28.771	OR	
Men's 5000 metre relay	21 February	Final A	Viktor Ahn; Semion Elistratov; Vladimir Grigorev; Ruslan Zakharov	Russia	6:42.100	OR	

OR = Olympic record

== Speed skating ==
Event	Date	Round	Athlete	Country	Time	Record	Ref
Men's 5000 metres	8 February	Pair 10	Sven Kramer	Netherlands	6:10.76	OR	
Men's 500 metres	10 February	Race 1 Pair 19; Race 2 Pair 19	Michel Mulder	Netherlands	1:09.312	WR (sea level)	
Women's 500 metres	11 February	Race 2 Pair 17	Lee Sang-hwa	South Korea	37.28	OR	
Women's 500 metres	11 February	Race 1 Pair 18; Race 2 Pair 17	Lee Sang-hwa	South Korea	1:14.70	OR; WR (sea level)	
Women's 1500 metres	16 February	Pair 9	Jorien ter Mors	Netherlands	1:53.51	OR	
Men's 10000 metres	18 February	Pair 6	Jorrit Bergsma	Netherlands	12:44.45	OR; WR (sea level)	
Women's team pursuit	21 February	Quarterfinal 4	Jorien ter Mors; Lotte van Beek; Ireen Wüst	Netherlands	2:58.61	OR	
Men's team pursuit	22 February	Final A	Jan Blokhuijsen; Sven Kramer; Koen Verweij	Netherlands	3:37.71	OR	
Women's team pursuit	22 February	Semifinal 2	Marrit Leenstra; Jorien ter Mors; Ireen Wüst	Netherlands	2:58.43	OR	
Women's team pursuit	22 February	Final A	Marrit Leenstra; Jorien ter Mors; Ireen Wüst	Netherlands	2:58.05	OR	

OR = Olympic record, WR = World record

== Other records ==
- Ole Einar Bjørndalen won gold at the 10 km sprint and mixed relay biathlon events, becoming the oldest Winter Olympics individual gold medalist at age 40; and the most successful Olympian in the history of the Winter Games with 13 medals, record number of total medals.
- Marit Bjørgen by winning her 6th career gold, in women's 30 km cross country race, equaled the record for most Winter Olympic medals by a woman, with 10. Of those with 10 medals, Stefania Belmondo and Raisa Smetanina, Bjørgen has the most golds. She surpassed the prior record holder for most female Olympic medals in cross country skiing, Lyubov Egorova, who has 9, 6 of them gold.
- Justine Dufour-Lapointe, 19 years 321 days, became the youngest freestyle skiing gold medalist, by winning women's moguls. She finished just ahead of her older sister silver medalist Chloe in women's moguls, her eldest sister, Maxime finished 12th. They became the third pair of sisters to finish 1–2 in an event at the Winter Games. It was the fifth time three siblings have competed at the same event at the Winter Games.
- Alexandre Bilodeau became the first freestyle skiing gold medalist to defend his Olympic title, and first repeat gold medalist, winning the men's moguls.
- Mario Matt, at age 34, became the oldest Olympic alpine skiing gold medalist, by winning the men's slalom.
- Henrik Kristoffersen, at age 19, became the youngest male Olympic alpine skiing medalist, winning bronze in men's slalom.
- Bode Miller, at age 36, became the oldest Olympic medalist in alpine skiing, winning a bronze in men's super-G.
- Mikaela Shiffrin, at age 18, became the youngest Olympic gold medalist in slalom, winning gold in women's slalom.
- Noriaki Kasai became the oldest athlete to win a ski-jumping Olympic medal.
- Armin Zöggeler, by winning bronze in men's luge, became the first Olympian to capture a medal in the same event in six consecutive Olympics, thus holding the record for most consecutive Olympics with medal wins in the same event.
- Vladimir Grigorev, at 31 years and 191 days, became the oldest man to win a short track speedskating Olympic medal, winning silver at the 1000 m event.
- Viktor Ahn became the first short track speedskater to win all four Olympic golds (500 m, 1000 m, 1500 m, 5000 m-relay), winning gold in 2014 in 500 m, 1000 m, 5000 m-relay, having golds from 2006 in 1000 m, 1500 m, 5000 m-relay, with the 500 m gold completing the four. He also became the short track speedskater with the most Olympic gold medals, with 6. He also has the most Olympic medals in short track with 8, tying Apolo Anton Ohno.
- Teemu Selänne, at age 43 years and 234 days, became the oldest ice hockey player to win an Olympic medal, by being part of Team Finland's bronze. He also holds the Olympic record for total ice hockey points, upping it to 43. He also shares the record for most appearances in ice hockey at the Olympics, appearing in 6.
- The Great Britain women's curling team beat both USA and Japan 12–3, equalling the Olympic record. In the game against USA, they scored seven points in one end, a new Olympic record.
- The Canadian women's curling team became the first women's team to win all of their matches in the tournament. They are also the first women's team to win all their round robin matches.
- A total of eight podium sweeps were recorded during the Games, where one nation won the gold, silver and bronze medals in an event. This was three higher than the previous most, during Innsbruck 1964.
