= Park Seung-hi =

South Korean speed skater

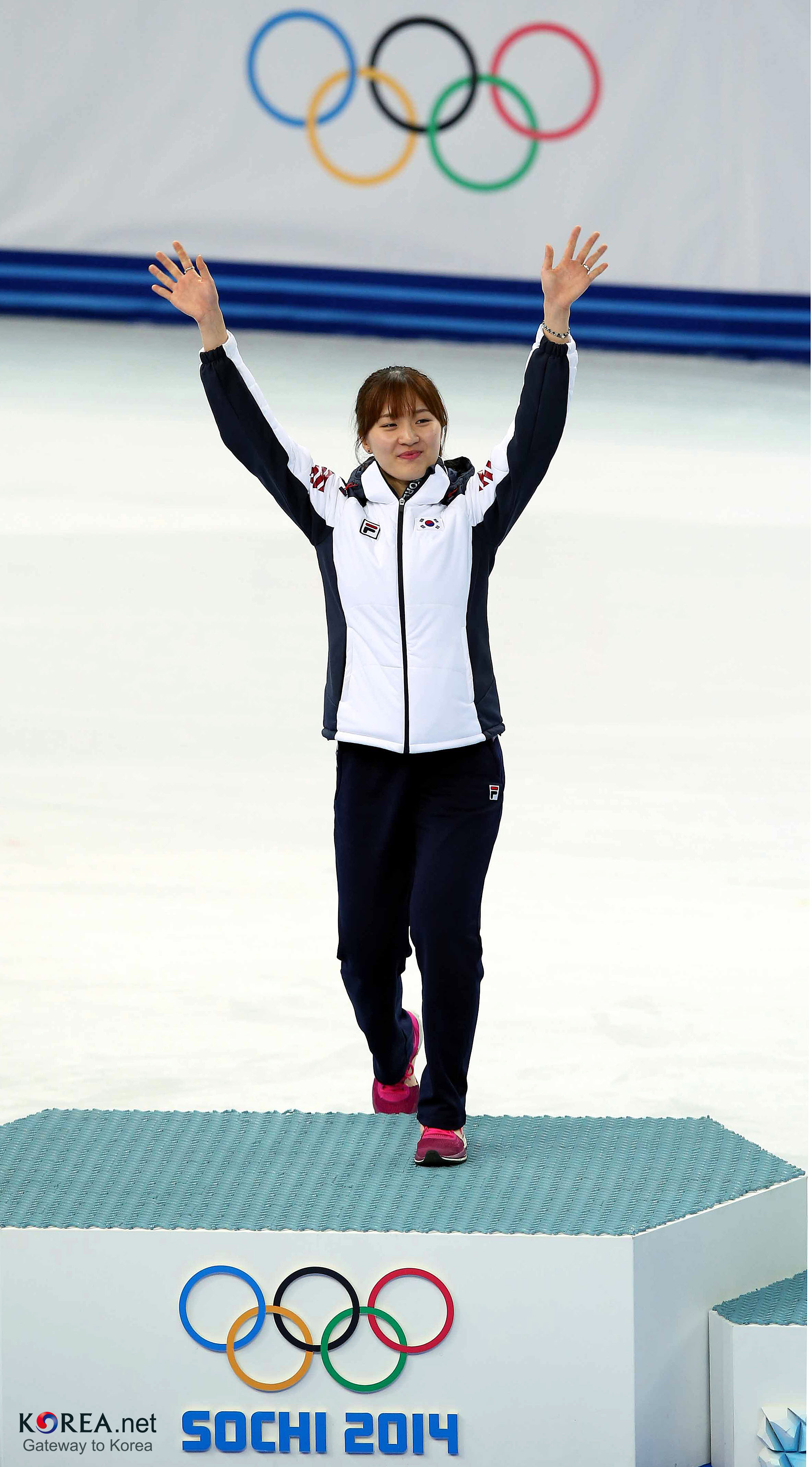
- Park Seung-hi at the 2014 Winter Olympics

Personal information
- Born: 28 March 1992 (age 34) Suwon, Gyeonggi, South Korea
- Height: 5 ft 6 in (168 cm)
- Weight: 121 lb (55 kg)

Sport
- Country: South Korea
- Sport: Speed skating
- Club: Hwaseong City (ST); Sports Toto (SS)
- Coached by: Cho Nam-kyu (ST); Lee Kyou-hyuk (SS)

Achievements and titles
- Personal bests: Short Track; 500m: 42.792 (2014); 1000m: 1:29.165 (2010); 1500m: 2:17.927 (2010); 3000m: 4:53.674 (2014); Long Track; 500m: 38,75 (2014); 1000m: 1.16,93 (2014); 1500m: 2.03,30 (2014)
Medal record
Representing South Korea
Women's short track speed skating
Event	1st	2nd	3rd
Olympic Games	2	0	3
World Championships	7	5	1
World Team Championships	2	1	0
Asian Games	1	2	0
World Junior Championships	1	2	2
Olympic Games
Gold medal – first place	2014 Sochi	1000 m
Gold medal – first place	2014 Sochi	3000 m relay
Bronze medal – third place	2010 Vancouver	1000 m
Bronze medal – third place	2010 Vancouver	1500 m
Bronze medal – third place	2014 Sochi	500 m
World Championships
Gold medal – first place	2008 Gangneung	3000 m relay
Gold medal – first place	2010 Sofia	Overall
Gold medal – first place	2010 Sofia	1500 m
Gold medal – first place	2010 Sofia	3000 m
Gold medal – first place	2010 Sofia	3000 m relay
Gold medal – first place	2013 Debrecen	1500 m
Gold medal – first place	2014 Montreal	500 m
Silver medal – second place	2011 Sheffield	1500 m
Silver medal – second place	2013 Debrecen	Overall
Silver medal – second place	2013 Debrecen	500 m
Silver medal – second place	2014 Montreal	1000 m
Silver medal – second place	2014 Montreal	Overall
Bronze medal – third place	2014 Montreal	1500 m
World Team Championships
Gold medal – first place	2010 Bormio	Team
Gold medal – first place	2011 Warsaw	Team
Silver medal – second place	2008 Harbin	Team
Asian Winter Games
Gold medal – first place	2011 Astana-Almaty	1000 m
Silver medal – second place	2011 Astana-Almaty	1500 m
Silver medal – second place	2011 Astana-Almaty	3000 m relay
World Junior Championships
Gold medal – first place	2007 Mladá Boleslav	2000 m relay
Silver medal – second place	2007 Mladá Boleslav	1000 m
Silver medal – second place	2007 Mladá Boleslav	1500 m SF
Bronze medal – third place	2007 Mladá Boleslav	1500 m
Bronze medal – third place	2007 Mladá Boleslav	Overall

- Park Seung-hi
- Hangul: 박승희
- Hanja: 朴勝羲
- RR: Bak Seunghui
- MR: Pak Sŭnghŭi

Park Seung-hi (Korean: 박승희, Korean pronunciation: [pak̚.s͈ɯŋ.ɦi]; born 28 March 1992) is a former South Korean short track and long track speed skater. She is the 2010 Overall World Champion. She won two gold medals and three bronze medals at 2010 Winter Olympics and 2014 Winter Olympics. Her sister is Park Seung-ju, a long track speed skater, and her brother Park Se-yeong, a short track speed skater. She switched to long-track speed skating after the 2014 Sochi Olympics. After the 2018 Pyeongchang Olympics Park announced her retirement from speedskating.

== Career ==
At the 2010 Winter Olympics, she competed in four events. In her first event, the 500 m, she was disqualified in the quarterfinals. Three days later, she competed in the 1500 m. Despite setting an Olympic record in the semifinals, she finished third in the final. In the 3000 m relay, her team finished first but was disqualified by one of the track judges. In the 1000 m, she won a bronze medal, finishing behind Wang Meng and Katherine Reutter.

At the 2014 Winter Olympics, she won two gold medals and a bronze.

After the 2014–15 season Park switched to long track speed skating where she qualified to represent South Korea at the 2015 World Single Distance Speed Skating Championships. She had originally planned on retiring from speedskating altogether after Sochi but wanted to challenge herself to skate in long track and also have the honor of competing in her home country in the 2018 Winter Olympics. She became the first South Korean athlete to ever compete in short track and long track speedskating at the Olympics.

At the 2018 Winter Olympics in Pyeongchang, Park competed in the women's 1000 metres event for speed skating, finishing 16th overall.

== Personal life ==
In July 2022, Park announced her first child's pregnancy via Instagram. In January 2023, Park's agency announced Park had given birth to their first daughter on January 12.

== International competition podiums ==
=== Short track speed skating ===
Date	Competition	Location	Rank	Event	Result
12 Jan 2007	2007 World Junior Championships	(Czech Republic) Mladá Boleslav	3rd place, bronze medalist(s)	1500 m	2:19.990
14 Jan 2007	2007 World Junior Championships	(Czech Republic) Mladá Boleslav	2nd place, silver medalist(s)	1000 m	1:32.507
14 Jan 2007	2007 World Junior Championships	(Czech Republic) Mladá Boleslav	2nd place, silver medalist(s)	1500m SF	2:19.990
14 Jan 2007	2007 World Junior Championships	(Czech Republic) Mladá Boleslav	3rd place, bronze medalist(s)	Overall	55 points
14 Jan 2007	2007 World Junior Championships	(Czech Republic) Mladá Boleslav	1st place, gold medalist(s)	2000m relay	52:54.136
21 Oct 2007	2007/2008 ISU World Cup 1st	(China) Harbin	3rd place, bronze medalist(s)	500m	43.925
21 Oct 2007	2007/2008 ISU World Cup 1st	(China) Harbin	2nd place, silver medalist(s)	3000m relay	4:13.374
27 Oct 2007	2007/2008 ISU World Cup 2nd	(Japan) Kobe	1st place, gold medalist(s)	1000 m	1:33.723
26 Oct 2002	2007/2008 ISU World Cup 3rd	(Netherlands) Heerenveen	2nd place, silver medalist(s)	500 m	44.819
01 Dec 2007	2007/2008 ISU World Cup 4th	(Italy) Turin	3rd place, bronze medalist(s)	1500 m	2:25.612
02 Feb 2008	2007/2008 ISU World Cup 5th	(Canada) Quebec City	3rd place, bronze medalist(s)	1000 m	1:34.162
10 Feb 2008	2007/2008 ISU World Cup 6th	(United States) Salt Lake City	1st place, gold medalist(s)	3000m relay	4:09.938
21 Oct 2008	2007/2008 ISU World Cup 1st	(China) Harbin	3rd place, bronze medalist(s)	500m	43.925
9 Mar 2008	2008 World Championships	(South Korea) Gangneung	1st place, gold medalist(s)	3000m relay	4:16.261
19 Oct 2008	2008/2009 ISU World Cup 1st	(United States) Salt Lake City	2nd place, silver medalist(s)	3000m relay	4:09.930
26 Oct 2008	2008/2009 ISU World Cup 2nd	(Canada) Vancouver	2nd place, silver medalist(s)	3000m relay	4:12.752
30 Nov 2008	2008/2009 ISU World Cup 3rd	(China) Beijing	2nd place, silver medalist(s)	3000m relay	4:08.230
7 Dec 2008	2008/2009 ISU World Cup 4th	(Japan) Nagano	2nd place, silver medalist(s)	3000m relay	4:13.320
15 Feb 2009	2008/2009 ISU World Cup 6th	(Germany) Dresden	3rd place, bronze medalist(s)	3000m relay	4:10.114
20 Sep 2009	2009/2010 ISU World Cup 1st	(China) Beijing	1st place, gold medalist(s)	3000m relay	4:13.531
26 Sep 2009	2009/2010 ISU World Cup 2nd	(South Korea) Seoul	3rd place, bronze medalist(s)	1000m	1:31.320
15 Nov 2009	2009/2010 ISU World Cup 4th	(United States) Marquette	3rd place, bronze medalist(s)	1000m	1:30.206
15 Nov 2009	2009/2010 ISU World Cup 4th	(United States) Marquette	2nd place, silver medalist(s)	3000 m relay	4:10.467
20 Feb 2010	2010 Winter Olympics	(Canada) Vancouver	Bronze medal	1500m	2:17.927
26 Feb 2010	2010 Winter Olympics	(Canada) Vancouver	Bronze medal	1000m	1:29.379
19 Mar 2010	2010 World Championships	(Bulgaria) Sofia	1st place, gold medalist(s)	1500 m	2:21.570
21 Mar 2010	2010 World Championships	(Bulgaria) Sofia	1st place, gold medalist(s)	3000m SF	5:04.070
21 Mar 2010	2010 World Championships	(Bulgaria) Sofia	1st place, gold medalist(s)	Overall	73 points
05 Dec 2010	2010/2011 ISU World Cup 3rd	(China) Changchun	1st place, gold medalist(s)	3000m relay	4:14.116
12 Dec 2010	2010/2011 ISU World Cup 4th	(China) Shanghai	2nd place, silver medalist(s)	1500m	2:32.607
12 Dec 2010	2010/2011 ISU World Cup 4th	(China) Shanghai	2nd place, silver medalist(s)	3000m relay	4:16.795
31 Jan 2011	2011 Asian Winter Games	(Kazakhstan) Astana	2nd place, silver medalist(s)	1500m	2:38.621
2 Feb 2011	2011 Asian Winter Games	(Kazakhstan) Astana	1st place, gold medalist(s)	1000m	1:33.343
2 Feb 2011	2011 Asian Winter Games	(Kazakhstan) Astana	2nd place, silver medalist(s)	3000m relay	4:30.010
20 Feb 2011	2010/2011 ISU World Cup 6th	(Germany) Dresden	2nd place, silver medalist(s)	3000m relay	4:12.735
11 Mar 2011	2011 World Championships	(United Kingdom) Sheffield	2nd place, silver medalist(s)	1500 m	2:34.218
1 Dec 2012	2012/2013 ISU World Cup 3rd	(Japan) Nagoya	2nd place, silver medalist(s)	1500 m	2:27.692
2 Dec 2012	2012/2013 ISU World Cup 3rd	(Japan) Nagoya	2nd place, silver medalist(s)	3000m relay	4:11.570
8 Dec 2012	2012/2013 ISU World Cup 4th	(China) Shanghai	1st place, gold medalist(s)	1000m	1:30.412
3 Feb 2013	2012/2013 ISU World Cup 5th	(Russia) Sochi	1st place, gold medalist(s)	1000m	1:30.073
9 Feb 2013	2012/2013 ISU World Cup 6th	(Germany) Dresden	3rd place, bronze medalist(s)	1000 m	1:58.954
8 Mar 2013	2013 World Championships	(Hungary) Debrecen	1st place, gold medalist(s)	1500 m	2:23.634
9 Mar 2013	2013 World Championships	(Hungary) Debrecen	2nd place, silver medalist(s)	500 m	43.850
10 Mar 2013	2013 World Championships	(Hungary) Debrecen	2nd place, silver medalist(s)	Overall	58 points
28 Sep 2013	2013/2014 ISU World Cup 1st	(China) Shanghai	2nd place, silver medalist(s)	500m	43.614
29 Sep 2013	2013/2014 ISU World Cup 1st	(China) Shanghai	1st place, gold medalist(s)	3000m relay	4:07.143
6 Oct 2013	2013/2014 ISU World Cup 2nd	(South Korea) Seoul	2nd place, silver medalist(s)	1000m	1:29.459
6 Oct 2013	2013/2014 ISU World Cup 2nd	(South Korea) Seoul	1st place, gold medalist(s)	3000m relay	4:06.824
9 Nov 2013	2013/2014 ISU World Cup 3rd	(Italy) Turin	2nd place, silver medalist(s)	1500 m	2:20.511
10 Nov 2013	2013/2014 ISU World Cup 3rd	(Italy) Turin	3rd place, bronze medalist(s)	1000 m	1:59.828
17 Nov 2013	2013/2014 ISU World Cup 4th	(Russia) Kolomna	2nd place, silver medalist(s)	3000m relay	4:09.794
13 Feb 2014	2014 Winter Olympics	(Russia) Sochi	Bronze medal	500m	54.207
18 Feb 2014	2014 Winter Olympics	(Russia) Sochi	Gold medal	3000m relay	4:09.498
21 Feb 2014	2014 Winter Olympics	(Russia) Sochi	Gold medal	1000m	1:30.761
14 Mar 2014	2014 World Championships	(Canada) Montreal	3rd place, bronze medalist(s)	1500 m	2:34.838
15 Mar 2014	2014 World Championships	(Canada) Montreal	1st place, gold medalist(s)	500m	42.792
16 Mar 2014	2014 World Championships	(Canada) Montreal	2nd place, silver medalist(s)	1000m	1:30.597
16 Mar 2014	2014 World Championships	(Canada) Montreal	2nd place, silver medalist(s)	Overall	73 points
