= Jessica Hewitt =

Canadian speed skater

Personal information
- Born: October 9, 1986 (age 39) Langley, British Columbia
- Height: 165 cm (5 ft 5 in) (2013)
- Weight: 53 kg (117 lb) (2013)
Medal record
Women's short track speed skating
Representing Canada
Olympic Games
Silver medal – second place	2014 Sochi	3000 m relay
World Championships
Silver medal – second place	2013 Debrecen	3000 m relay
Bronze medal – third place	2011 Sheffield	3000 m relay
- Updated on 5 July 2014

Jessica Hewitt (born October 9, 1986) is a Canadian short track speed skater. In February 2013, she qualified to participate in the 2014 Sochi Olympics, representing Canada in the short track speed skating.

== Career ==
Jessica Hewitt started training with the Kamloops Long Blades at the age of 10. In 2006, she moved to Calgary where she trained at the Olympic Oval. She made the national team in 2008.

In 2009, she placed eighth in the 500 m, 12th in the 1000 m and eighth the 1500 m at the 2010 Olympic Qualifiers held in Vancouver. She continued to skate and moved to Montreal in 2011 to train with the national team. In the 2012–13 season, she competed at her third world championships, winning the silver medal in the relay. In the world cup, she won two silver medals in the relay. At the end of the season, she was ranked 31st in the 500 m, 13th in the 1000 m and 16th in the 1500 m. Domestically, she was second overall in September 2012 at the fall world cup selections and ranked third in the Canadian Open Championships. A ranking of third overall in the end of the season.

In February 2013, during the Olympic qualifiers, she was ranked third overall finishing second in the 500 m, allowing her to represent Canada's short track speed skating squad for the 2014 Sochi Olympics. She was joined by Jessica Gregg, Marie-Ève Drolet, Marianne St-Gelais and Valérie Maltais.
