= Kong Sang-jeong =

South Korean speed skater

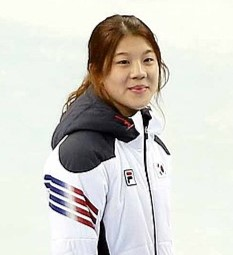

Medal record

Representing South Korea

Women's short track speed skating

Olympic Games
Gold medal – first place	2014 Sochi	3000 m relay

World Junior Championships
Gold medal – first place	2013 Warsaw	3000m relay
Gold medal – first place	2015 Osaka	Overall
Silver medal – second place	2015 Osaka	1000m super final relay
Silver medal – second place	2015 Osaka	1500m super final relay

- Kong Sang-jeong
- Hangul: 공상정
- Hanja: 孔尙貞
- RR: Gong Sangjeong
- MR: Kong Sangjŏng
- IPA: [koŋ sʰaŋdʑʌŋ]

Kong Sang-jeong
- Simplified Chinese: 孔尚贞
Transcriptions
Standard Mandarin
- Hanyu Pinyin: Kǒng Shàngzhēn

Kong Sang-jeong (Korean: 공상정; Korean pronunciation: [koŋ.saŋ.dʑʌŋ]; born 22 June 1996 in Chuncheon, Gangwon Province) is a South Korean short track speed skater who won a gold Olympic medal at the 2014 Winter Olympics in the 3000 metre relay.

== Early life ==
Kong is a third-generation descendant of Chinese immigrants to Korea. Her grandfather fled from mainland China in 1949, after the Chinese communist victory in the Chinese Civil War, and settled in Chuncheon. Her parents also grew up in Chuncheon and currently runs a clinic in the city.

Kong was born with Republic of China nationality. She attended and graduated from Kyongin Elementary School, Wolchon Middle School and Yubong Girls’ High School in Seoul. During her time in school, Kong suffered insults from her classmates due to her Chinese ethnicity.

In 2015, she began her studies for bachelor's degree at the Faculty of International Sports in Korea University. She graduated in 2019.

== Sports career ==
When she was in the 5th grade of elementary school, she was transferred to Seoul for training in skating. While attending Wolchon Middle School, she won the overall championship in the junior national skating team selection. As a result, she was chosen to represent South Korea at the junior level already in 2010, but could not compete in the 2011 World Junior Short Track Speed Skating Championships as she did not have South Korean citizenship at the time. She was granted citizenship by the South Korean Ministry of Justice in December 2011 thanks to a revised nationality law that allowed dual citizenship for individuals of outstanding talent.

She participated in the 2013 World Junior Short Track Speed Skating Championships in Warsaw, where she won gold medal in the 3000m relay.

During the 2014 Winter Olympics in Sochi, she was part of the Short Track Speed Skating team in the '3000m relay' that won a gold medal. After the Olympics, she won the 500m short track at the 95th National Winter Sports Festival in Seongnam-si, Gyeonggi Province. At the 2015 World Junior Short Track Speed Skating Championships in Osaka, she won gold medals in all-around, 1500m and 3000m relays, and silver medal in 1000m and 1500m super final relays. For her performances, she was named the Lady 2015 ISU World Junior Short Track Speed Skating Champion.

On 2016, during selections for junior national skating team, Kong passed the first and second rounds, finishing at fourth position and was selected to the preliminary national team for the 2015–2016 season. However, due to her suffering from a sudden back injury in June, she was not selected for the national team.

On 3 May 2021, in an Instagram post, Kong announced her retirement from international competition.
