= Elena Viviani =

Italian short track speed skater

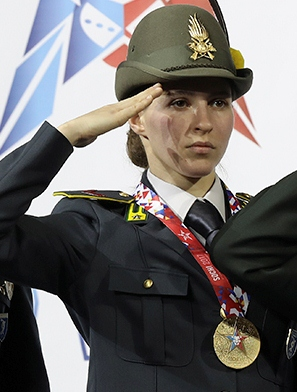
- Elena Viviani at the 2017 Winter World Military Games in Sochi

Medal record

Women's short track speed skating

Representing Italy

Olympic Games
Bronze medal – third place	2014 Sochi	3000 m relay

World Championships
Bronze medal – third place	2014 Montreal	3000 m relay
Bronze medal – third place	2015 Moscow	3000 m relay

World Military Games
Gold medal – first place	2017 Sochi	3000 m mixed

Elena Viviani (born 10 October 1992) is an Italian short track speed skater who won a bronze Olympic medal at the 2014 Winter Olympics in 3000 metre relay.
