= Kim A-lang =

South Korean speed skater (born 1995)

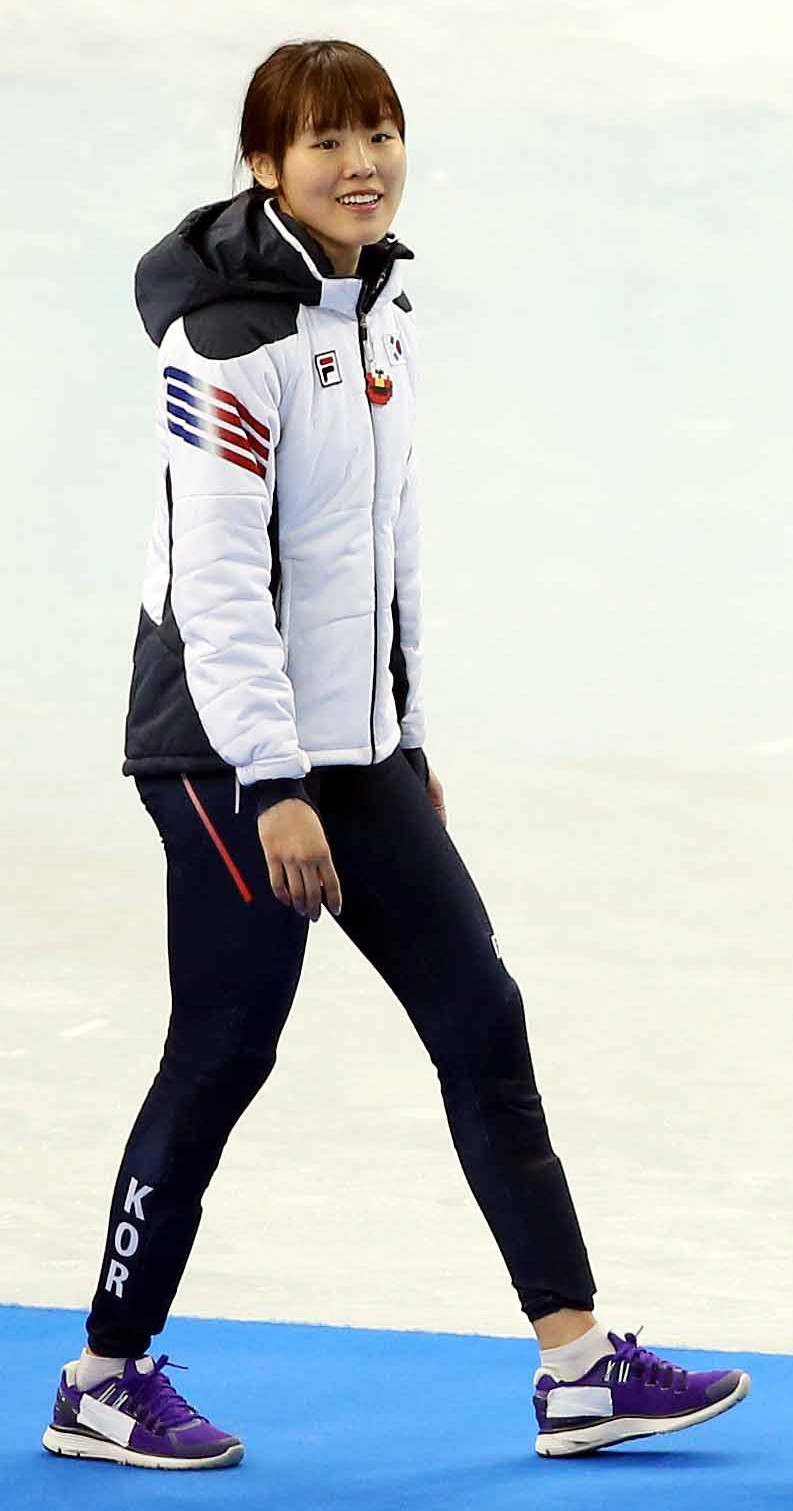
- Kim in 2014

Personal information
- Nationality: South Korean
- Born: 22 August 1995 (age 30) Wansan-gu, Jeonju, Jeollabuk-do, South Korea
- Height: 1.72 m (5 ft 8 in)
- Weight: 60 kg (132 lb)

Sport
- Country: South Korea
- Sport: Short track speed skating
- Club: Goyang City Hall
Medal record
Women's short track speed skating
Representing South Korea
Olympic Games
Gold medal – first place	2014 Sochi	3000 m relay
Gold medal – first place	2018 Pyeongchang	3000 m relay
Silver medal – second place	2022 Beijing	3000 m relay
World Championships
Gold medal – first place	2015 Moscow	3000 m relay
Gold medal – first place	2016 Seoul	3000 m relay
Gold medal – first place	2018 Montreal	3000 m relay
Gold medal – first place	2022 Montreal	3000 m relay
Silver medal – second place	2014 Montreal	1500 m
World Junior Championships
Silver medal – second place	2013 Warsaw	Overall
Winter Universiade
Gold medal – first place	2015 Granada	1000 m
Gold medal – first place	2015 Granada	1500 m
Gold medal – first place	2017 Almaty	3000 m relay
Gold medal – first place	2019 Krasnoyarsk	1500 m
Gold medal – first place	2019 Krasnoyarsk	1000 m
Silver medal – second place	2015 Granada	3000 m relay
Silver medal – second place	2017 Almaty	1500 m
Bronze medal – third place	2017 Almaty	500 m

- Kim A-lang
- Hangul: 김아랑
- RR: Gim Arang
- MR: Kim Arang

Kim A-lang (Korean: 김아랑, born 22 August 1995) is a South Korean former short track speed skater. Kim made her debut on the international stage with two gold medals and one silver medal at the 2013 World Junior Short Track Speed Skating Championships, placing second in the overall ranking. Kim was part of the short track speed skating team in the 3000 m relay that won a gold medal at the 2014 Winter Olympics. Four years later, she won another gold in the relay at the 2018 Winter Olympics.

== Personal life ==
Kim, who was born in Jeonju, went to the skating rink along with her brother during elementary school.

In 2022, Kim signs a contract with Sandbox for YouTube activities.

== Filmography ==
=== Television shows ===
Year	Title	Role	Note(s)	Ref.
2022	Knowing Bros	Guest	Episode 322, with Kwak Yoon-gy and Lee Yu-bin	
2022	I Live Alone	Guest	Appeared in episode 436, she could not participate in the show due to COVID-19 infection	
