= Vladimir Grigoryev =

Russian short track speed skater

Vladimir Grigorev
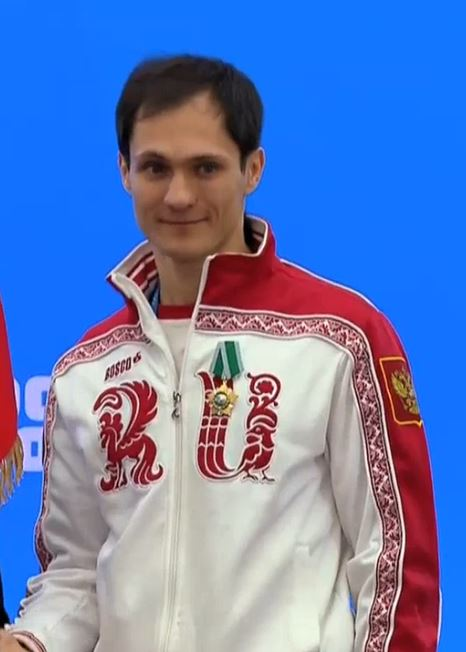

Personal information
- Born: 8 August 1982 (age 44) Shostka, Sumy Oblast, Ukrainian SSR, Soviet Union
- Height: 178 cm (5 ft 10 in)
- Weight: 83 kg (183 lb)

Sport
- Country: Ukraine (until 2007) / Russia (since 2007)
- Sport: Short track speed skating

Achievements and titles
- Personal bests: 500 m: 40.344 (2012, Former WR); 1000 m: 1:23.795 (2013); 1500 m: 2:11.514 (2018); 3000 m: 4:53.771 (2012)
Medal record
Men's short track speed skating
Representing Russia
Olympic Games
Gold medal – first place	2014 Sochi	5000 m relay
Silver medal – second place	2014 Sochi	1000 m
World Championships
Silver medal – second place	2013 Debrecen	5000 m relay
European Championships
Gold medal – first place	2013 Malmö	500m
Gold medal – first place	2013 Malmö	5000m relay
Gold medal – first place	2014 Debrecen	5000m relay
Gold medal – first place	2015 Dordrecht	5000m relay
Silver medal – second place	2011 Heerenveen	5000m relay
Silver medal – second place	2012 Mladá Boleslav	5000m relay
Bronze medal – third place	2013 Malmö	Overall
Bronze medal – third place	2014 Debrecen	500m
Bronze medal – third place	2014 Debrecen	1000m
Representing Ukraine
European Championships
Bronze medal – third place	2005 Turin	5000m relay

Vladimir Viktorovich Grigorev (Russian: Владимир Викторович Григорьев; born 8 August 1982) is a Russian short track speed skater. He previously competed for Ukraine. Grigorev is from Sumy in Ukraine.

== Career ==
Grigorev competed for Ukraine in short track speed skating at the 2002 Winter Olympics, and the 2006 Torino Winter Olympics.

He did not compete at the 2010 Olympics, and, in 2007, switched allegiance to Russia, due to a shortage of skating facilities in Ukraine.

He qualified to compete for Russia at the 2014 Sochi Winter Olympics. On 15 February 2014, he won a silver medal in the 1000m short track speedskating event, as part of the first Russian 1-2 finish in short track, with Viktor Ahn winning gold. With his silver, at 31 years and 191 days of age, Grigorev became the oldest man to win a short track Olympic medal. On 21 February 2014, he won a gold medal in 5000m-relay as part of Team Russia.
