= Marie-Ève Drolet =

Short-track speed skater

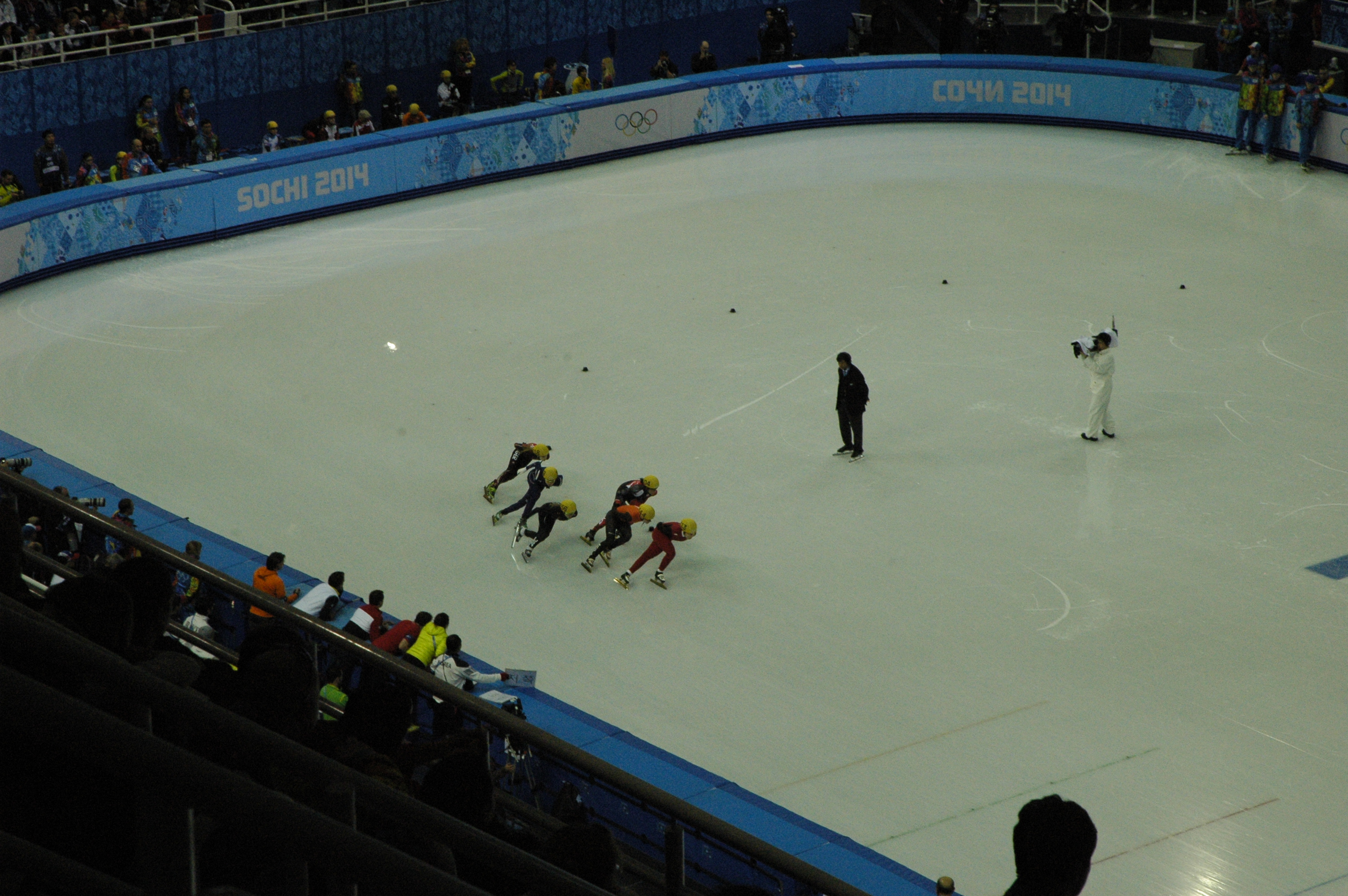

Personal information
- Born: February 3, 1982 (age 44) Chicoutimi, Quebec, Canada
- Height: 167 cm (5 ft 6 in)
- Weight: 60 kg (132 lb)

Sport
- Country: Canada
- Sport: Short track speed skating
Medal record
Women's short track speed skating
Representing Canada
Olympic Games
Silver medal – second place	2014 Sochi	3000 m relay
Bronze medal – third place	2002 Salt Lake City	3000 m relay
World Championships
Silver medal – second place	2014 Montréal	3000 m relay
Silver medal – second place	2013 Debrecen	3000 m relay
Bronze medal – third place	2001 Jeonju	1500 m
Bronze medal – third place	2002 Montreal	3000 m relay
Bronze medal – third place	2011 Sheffield	3000 m relay
Bronze medal – third place	2012 Shanghai	1500 m
Bronze medal – third place	2012 Shanghai	3000 m
World Junior Championships
Gold medal – first place	2000 Szekesfehervar	Overall
Gold medal – first place	2001 Warsaw	Overall

Marie-Ève Drolet (born February 3, 1982) is a Canadian short track speed skater who competed in the 2002 Winter Olympics where she won a bronze in the relay event. She also has six ISU World Championship medals to her name and was a two time overall World Junior Champion in 2000 and again in 2001.

== Career ==
In 2002, she was a member of the Canadian relay team which won the bronze medal in the 3000 metre relay competition. In the 1000 m event she finished fourth and in the 1500 m contest she finished sixth. Surprisingly to most of the public she announced her retirement after the 2002 Olympics. Though Drolet was seen as a successor to Nathalie Lambert, Isabelle Charest and Annie Perreault, she herself did not feel the same way. Instead she said that "I wanted to stop. I no longer wanted to be an athlete; I wanted to be a student. I was only 20, so I wanted to do other things. I wanted to travel, make new experiences."

Drolet took a six-year hiatus that saw her complete a degree in psychology, with time spent in Brazil, Thunder Bay, Ontario, and High Level, Alberta, where she worked planting trees. During this time she spent more time learning English and acupuncture all while working at a day care. Though she watched the 2006 Winter Olympics with no regrets she stated that in 2008 the life of traveling and studies she had lived felt fulfilled and that she had achieved all that she wanted to in those aspects of life, again she wanted a new challenge which was a return to speed skating.

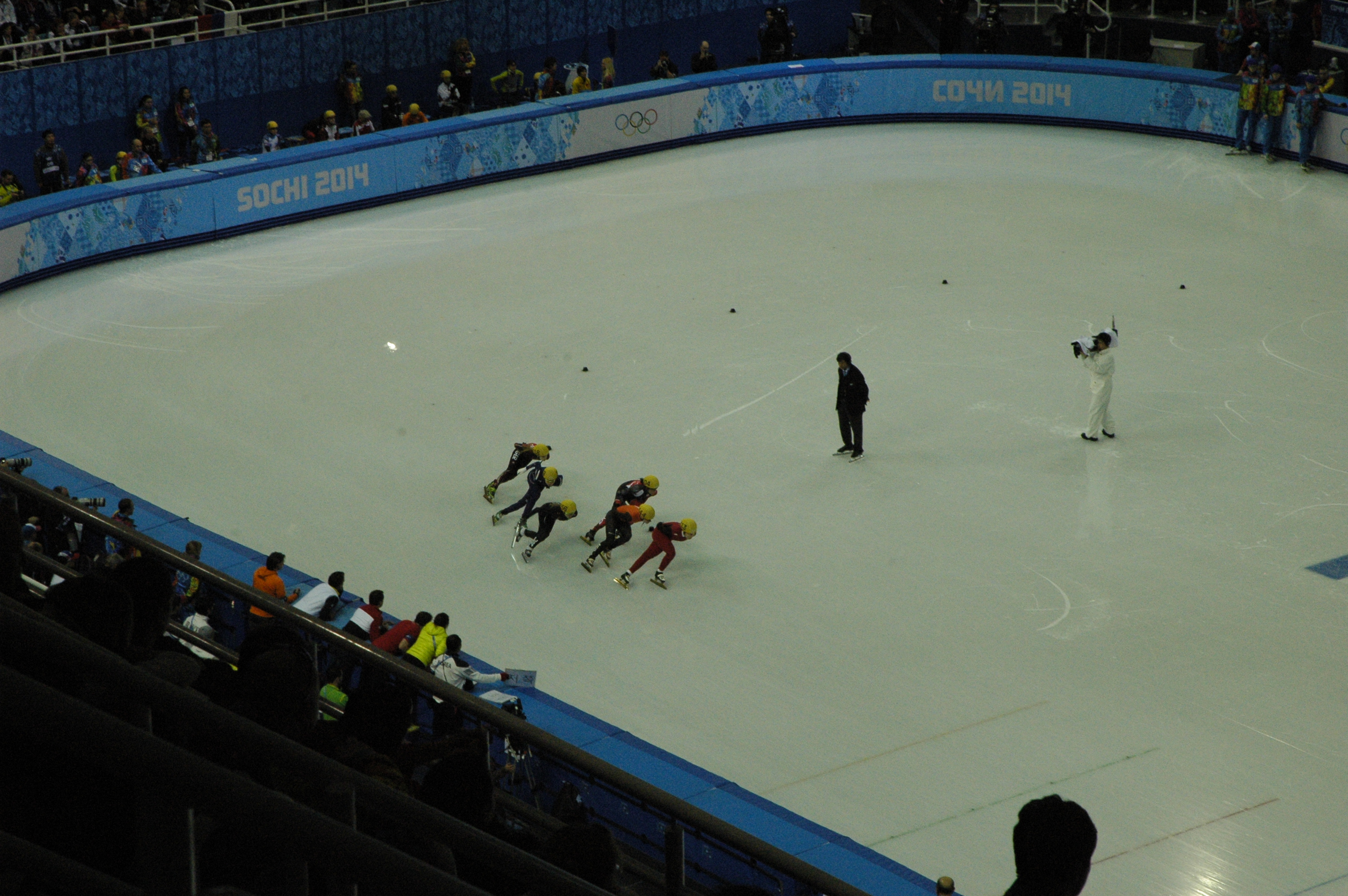
Drolet competing at the 2014 Winter Olympics

This also came with new changes which as an adult meant she no longer trained and lived at home in Chicoutimi, instead she opted to move to Calgary and train and the Olympic Oval. Drolet also found that in her six-year absence the sport had change dramatically as well as the rules and strategy involved which was somewhat disconcerting to the former world junior champion. She said of her new sporting environment that "I was physically strong, but in terms of competing, I wasn’t, I was getting pushed around, it was too aggressive for me. I was not used to getting tossed around. So, I have had to learn to manage this and to remain physically strong when someone touched me. That was a huge change that I had to face in my first year back." All this meant that she failed to qualify for the 2010 Winter Olympics on home soil in Vancouver.

The 2014 Winter Olympics though saw her qualify, despite an injury that meant she missed three World Cup events as well as the national qualifying races. On doing this Drolet said "When I was 20, I would have not realized it. I am proud of what I’ve accomplished, of having taken a detour, and in the end, it all turned out well. I’m happy that I was able to accomplish the challenge that I had given myself." The following season Drolet took the year off with the birth of her first child due in January 2015.
