= 2010–11 ISU Short Track Speed Skating World Cup =

International speed skating competition

ISU Short Track World Cup
- Dates: 22 October 2010 – 19 February 2011

The 2010–11 ISU Short Track Speed Skating World Cup was a multi-race tournament over a season for short track speed skating. The season began on 22 October 2010 and ended on 19 February 2011. The World Cup was organised by the ISU who also ran world cups and championships in speed skating and figure skating.

== Calendar ==
=== Men ===
==== Montreal ====
Date	Place	Distance	Winner	Second	Third	Reference
23 October 2010	Maurice Richard Arena	1000m	Thibaut Fauconnet (FRA)	Michael Gilday (CAN)	Travis Jayner (USA)	
23 October 2010	Maurice Richard Arena	1500m (1)	Jeff Simon (USA)	Simon Cho (USA)	Guillaume Bastille (CAN)	
24 October 2010	Maurice Richard Arena	500m	Charles Hamelin (CAN)	Simon Cho (USA)	Liang Wenhao (CHN)	
24 October 2010	Maurice Richard Arena	1500m (2)	Guillaume Bastille (CAN)	Travis Jayner (USA)	Maxime Chataignier (FRA)	
24 October 2010	Maurice Richard Arena	5000m relay	Canada	France	United States	

==== Quebec City ====
Date	Place	Distance	Winner	Second	Third	Reference
30 October 2010	Pavillon de la Jeunesse	1000m (1)	Thibaut Fauconnet (FRA)	Yu Yongjun (CHN)	Anthony Lobello Jr. (USA)	
30 October 2010	Pavillon de la Jeunesse	1500m	Michael Gilday (CAN)	Nicola Rodigari (ITA)	Maxime Chataignier (FRA)	
31 October 2010	Pavillon de la Jeunesse	500m	François-Louis Tremblay (CAN)	Liang Wenhao (CHN)	François Hamelin (CAN)	
31 October 2010	Pavillon de la Jeunesse	1000m (2)	Charles Hamelin (CAN)	Travis Jayner (USA)	Guillaume Bastille (CAN)	
31 October 2010	Pavillon de la Jeunesse	5000m relay	Canada	United States	Italy	

==== Changchun ====
Date	Place	Distance	Winner	Second	Third	Reference
4 December 2010	Five Loop Palaestra	500m (1)	Han Jialiang (CHN)	Thibaut Fauconnet (FRA)	Ryan Bedford (USA)	
4 December 2010	Five Loop Palaestra	1500m	Lee Ho-suk (KOR)	Liu Xianwei (CHN)	Jeff Simon (USA)	
5 December 2010	Five Loop Palaestra	500m (2)	Semen Elistratov (RUS)	Rémi Beaulieu-Tinker (CAN)	Ryosuke Sakazume (JPN)	
5 December 2010	Five Loop Palaestra	1000m	Kim Byeong-jun (KOR)	Thibaut Fauconnet (FRA)	Maxime Chataignier (FRA)	
5 December 2010	Five Loop Palaestra	5000m relay	Canada	United States	South Korea	

==== Shanghai ====
Date	Place	Distance	Winner	Second	Third	Reference
11 December 2010	Shanghai railway station	1000m	Noh Jin-kyu (KOR)	Sjinkie Knegt (NED)	Lee Ho-suk (KOR)	
11 December 2010	Shanghai railway station	1500m (1)	Kim Cheol-min (KOR)	Song Weilong (CHN)	Maxime Chataignier (FRA)	
12 December 2010	Shanghai railway station	500m	Sung Si-bak (KOR)	Thibaut Fauconnet (FRA)	Lee Ho-suk (KOR)	
12 December 2010	Shanghai railway station	1500m (2)	Noh Jin-kyu (KOR)	Yuzo Takamido (JPN)	Olivier Jean (CAN)	
12 December 2010	Shanghai railway station	5000m relay	South Korea	Canada	Netherlands	

==== Moscow ====
Date	Place	Distance	Winner	Second	Third	Reference
12 February 2011	Megasport Arena	1000m (1)	Kim Byeong-jun (KOR)	François Hamelin (CAN)	Liang Wenhao (CHN)	
12 February 2011	Megasport Arena	1500m	Noh Jin-kyu (KOR)	Travis Jayner (USA)	Michael Gilday (CAN)	
13 February 2011	Megasport Arena	500m	Simon Cho (USA)	Paul Stanley (GBR)	Freek van der Wart (NED)	
13 February 2011	Megasport Arena	1000m (2)	Noh Jin-kyu (KOR)	Thibaut Fauconnet (FRA)	Travis Jayner (USA)	
13 February 2011	Megasport Arena	5000m relay	Netherlands	France	Canada	

==== Dresden ====
Date	Place	Distance	Winner	Second	Third	Reference
19 February 2011	EnergieVerbund Arena	500m (1)	Thibaut Fauconnet (FRA)	Simon Cho (USA)	Travis Jayner (USA)	
19 February 2011	EnergieVerbund Arena	1500m	Liu Xianwei (CHN)	Lee Ho-suk (KOR)	Michael Gilday (CAN)	
20 February 2011	EnergieVerbund Arena	500m (2)	Simon Cho (USA)	Liang Wenhao (CHN)	Thibaut Fauconnet (FRA)	
20 February 2011	EnergieVerbund Arena	1000m	Song Weilong (CHN)	Guillaume Bastille (CAN)	Noh Jin-kyu (KOR)	
20 February 2011	EnergieVerbund Arena	5000m relay	Germany	South Korea	Canada	

=== Women ===
==== Montreal ====
Date	Place	Distance	Winner	Second	Third	Reference
23 October 2010	Maurice Richard Arena	1000m	Katherine Reutter (USA)	Marianne St-Gelais (CAN)	Liu Qiuhong (CHN)	
23 October 2010	Maurice Richard Arena	1500m (1)	Lana Gehring (USA)	Zhou Yang (CHN)	Valérie Maltais (CAN)	
24 October 2010	Maurice Richard Arena	500m	Marianne St-Gelais (CAN)	Arianna Fontana (ITA)	Valérie Lambert (CAN)	
24 October 2010	Maurice Richard Arena	1500m (2)	Katherine Reutter (USA)	Marie-Ève Drolet (CAN)	Zhou Yang (CHN)	
24 October 2010	Maurice Richard Arena	3000m relay	China	United States	Canada	

==== Quebec City ====
Date	Place	Distance	Winner	Second	Third	Reference
30 October 2010	Pavillon de la Jeunesse	1000m (1)	Lana Gehring (USA)	Arianna Fontana (ITA)	Marianne St-Gelais (CAN)	
30 October 2010	Pavillon de la Jeunesse	1500m	Zhou Yang (CHN)	Katherine Reutter (USA)	Biba Sakurai (JPN)	
31 October 2010	Pavillon de la Jeunesse	500m	Marianne St-Gelais (CAN)	Arianna Fontana (ITA)	Fan Kexin (CHN)	
31 October 2010	Pavillon de la Jeunesse	1000m (2)	Zhou Yang (CHN)	Katherine Reutter (USA)	Elise Christie (GBR)	
31 October 2010	Pavillon de la Jeunesse	3000m relay	China	Canada	United States	

==== Changchun ====
Date	Place	Distance	Winner	Second	Third	Reference
4 December 2010	Five Loop Palaestra	500m (1)	Zhao Nannan (CHN)	Liu Qiuhong (CHN)	Fan Kexin (CHN)	
4 December 2010	Five Loop Palaestra	1500m	Katherine Reutter (USA)	Cho Ha-ri (KOR)	Biba Sakurai (JPN)	
5 December 2010	Five Loop Palaestra	500m (2)	Zhao Nannan (CHN)	Fan Kexin (CHN)	Kim Dam-min (KOR)	
5 December 2010	Five Loop Palaestra	1000m	Yang Shin-young (KOR)	Marie-Ève Drolet (CAN)	Zhou Yang (CHN)	
5 December 2010	Five Loop Palaestra	3000m relay	South Korea	China	Netherlands	

==== Shanghai ====
Date	Place	Distance	Winner	Second	Third	Reference
11 December 2010	Shanghai railway station	1000m	Cho Ha-ri (KOR)	Zhou Yang (CHN)	Liu Qiuhong (CHN)	
11 December 2010	Shanghai railway station	1500m (1)	Yang Shin-young (KOR)	Hwang Hyun-sun (KOR)	Kim Dam-min (KOR)	
12 December 2010	Shanghai railway station	500m	Zhao Nannan (CHN)	Liu Qiuhong (CHN)	Jessica Gregg (CAN)	
12 December 2010	Shanghai railway station	1500m (2)	Cho Ha-ri (KOR)	Park Seung-hi (KOR)	Zhou Yang (CHN)	
12 December 2010	Shanghai railway station	3000m relay	China	South Korea	Italy	

==== Moscow ====
Date	Place	Distance	Winner	Second	Third	Reference
12 February 2011	Megasport Arena	1000m (1)	Yang Shin-young (KOR)	Hwang Hyun-sun (KOR)	Li Jianrou (CHN)	
12 February 2011	Megasport Arena	1500m	Katherine Reutter (USA)	Cho Ha-ri (KOR)	Kim Dam-min (KOR)	
13 February 2011	Megasport Arena	500m	Marianne St-Gelais (CAN)	Liu Qiuhong (CHN)	Martina Valcepina (ITA)	
13 February 2011	Megasport Arena	1000m (2)	Katherine Reutter (USA)	Hwang Hyun-sun (KOR)	Kim Dam-min (KOR)	
13 February 2011	Megasport Arena	3000m relay	China	Canada	Italy	

==== Dresden ====
Date	Place	Distance	Winner	Second	Third	Reference
19 February 2011	EnergieVerbund Arena	500m (1)	Marianne St-Gelais (CAN)	Liu Qiuhong (CHN)	Martina Valcepina (ITA)	
19 February 2011	EnergieVerbund Arena	1500m	Yang Shin-young (KOR)	Marie-Ève Drolet (CAN)	Hwang Hyun-sun (KOR)	
20 February 2011	EnergieVerbund Arena	500m (2)	Marianne St-Gelais (CAN)	Martina Valcepina (ITA)	Liu Qiuhong (CHN)	
20 February 2011	EnergieVerbund Arena	1000m	Yang Shin-young (KOR)	Yui Sakai (JPN)	Marie-Ève Drolet (CAN)	
20 February 2011	EnergieVerbund Arena	3000m relay	United States	South Korea	Canada	

== Final standings ==
=== Men ===
Distance	Winner	Points	Second	Points	Third	Points	Reference
500m	Simon Cho (USA)	3978	Thibaut Fauconnet (FRA)	3275	Liang Wenhao (CHN)	2550	
1000m	Thibaut Fauconnet (FRA)	4220	Noh Jin-kyu (KOR)	3152	Travis Jayner (USA)	2411	
1500m	Maxime Chataignier (FRA)	2405	Liu Xianwei (CHN)	2358	Michael Gilday (CAN)	2306	
5000m relay	Canada	3800	South Korea	2850	Netherlands	2460	

=== Women ===
Distance	Winner	Points	Second	Points	Third	Points	Reference
500m	Marianne St-Gelais (CAN)	5000	Liu Qiuhong (CHN)	4250	Zhao Nannan (CHN)	3840	
1000m	Katherine Reutter (USA)	3136	Yang Shin-young (KOR)	3000	Zhou Yang (CHN)	2440	
1500m	Katherine Reutter (USA)	4210	Zhou Yang (CHN)	3490	Cho Ha-ri (KOR)	2600	
3000m relay	China	4000	Canada	2880	United States	2850	

== Podium summary ==
Rank	Nation	Gold	Silver	Bronze	Total
1	South Korea (KOR)	18	10	9	37
2	Canada (CAN)	13	11	15	39
3	China (CHN)	12	13	11	36
4	United States (USA)	11	11	8	30
5	France (FRA)	3	6	5	14
6	Netherlands (NED)	1	1	3	5
7	Germany (GER)	1	0	0	1
7	Russia (RUS)	1	0	0	1
9	Italy (ITA)	0	5	5	10
10	Japan (JPN)	0	2	3	5
11	Great Britain (GBR)	0	1	1	2
Totals (11 entries)		60	60	60	180

== See also ==
- 2011 World Short Track Speed Skating Championships
- 2011 World Short Track Speed Skating Team Championships
- 2011 European Short Track Speed Skating Championships
