= Choi Jung-won =

- Hangul: 최정원
- RR: Choe Jeongwon
- MR: Ch'oe Chŏngwŏn

Choi Jung-won (Korean: 최정원) is a Korean name consisting of the family name Choi and the given name Jung-won, and may refer to:

- Choi Jung-won (actress, born 1969) (born 1969), South Korean actress
- Choi Jung-won (actress, born 1981) (born 1981), South Korean actress
- Choi Jung-won (singer) (born 1981), South Korean singer and actor
- Choi Jung-won (speed skater) (born 1990), South Korean speed skater
- Choi Jung-won (footballer) (born 1995), South Korean footballer
