= Scad =

Scad may refer to:

== Science, technology, and health care ==
- Acronym "SCAD"
  - Spontaneous coronary artery dissection
  - Stable coronary artery disease (stable ischemic heart disease) (see Coronary artery disease § Stable angina)
  - Segmental colitis associated with diverticulosis, a type of colitis
  - Short-chain acyl-CoA dehydrogenase, an enzyme
- Scad, name for various fish in the jack family, Carangidae
  - the common name of the genus Alepes
    - Herring scad, a species of tropical marine fish in this genus
    - Razorbelly scad
    - Smallmouth scad
  - the common name of the jackfish genus Decapterus
    - Round scad
- ".scad" file format used by OpenSCAD

== Sport ==
- Suspended Catch Air Device, a variety of bungee jumping

== Other ==
- Savannah College of Art and Design, a university in the United States
- Security Council Affairs Division, part of the Department of Political and Peacebuilding Affairs of the United Nations
