= 2011 World Short Track Speed Skating Championships – Women's 1000 metres =

The women's 1000 metre at the 2011 World Short Track Speed Skating Championships took place 13 March at the Sheffield Arena.

== Results ==
=== Heats ===
Top 2 Athletes from each heat qualified for quarterfinals.

Heat 1

Rank	Athlete	Country	Time	Notes
1	Katherine Reutter	United States	1:39.845	Q
2	Yui Sakai	Japan	1:39.945	Q
3	Marina Georgieva-Nikolova	Bulgaria	1:40.083	
4	Chung Hsiao-Ying	Chinese Taipei	1:41.518	
5	Ottilia Sillo	Romania	1:44.212	

Heat 3

Rank	Athlete	Country	Time	Notes
1	Yang Shin-young	South Korea	1:33.671	Q
2	Jessica Hewitt	Canada	1:33.707	Q
3	Martina Valcepina	Italy	1:34.353	
4	Tatiana Bodova	Slovakia	1:35.525	

Heat 5

Rank	Athlete	Country	Time	Notes
1	Park Seung-Hi	South Korea	1:36.181	Q
2	Lana Gehring	United States	1:36.320	Q
3	Vera Antanenka	Belarus	1:36.417	
4	Ainara Equisoain	Spain	1:55.472	

Heat 7

Rank	Athlete	Country	Time	Notes
1	Marie-Ève Drolet	Canada	1:36.462	Q
2	Jorien ter Mors	Netherlands	1:36.566	Q
3	Veronika Windisch	Austria	1:36.965	
4	Yesl Jung	Australia	1:42.640	

Heat 9

Rank	Athlete	Country	Time	Notes
1	Arianna Fontana	Italy	1:39.094	Q
2	Bianca Walter	Germany	1:54.582	Q
–	Volha Talayeva	Belarus		PEN
–	Bernadett Heidum	Hungary		DNS

Heat 2

Rank	Athlete	Country	Time	Notes
1	Fan Kexin	China	1:40.357	Q
2	Biba Sakurai	Japan	1:40.451	Q
3	Olga Belyakova	Russia	1:40.467	
4	Raya Zaharieva	Bulgaria	1:41.374	
5	Garazi Ganuza	Spain	1:56.305	

Heat 4

Rank	Athlete	Country	Time	Notes
1	Elise Christie	United Kingdom	1:34.014	Q
2	Liu Qiuhong	China	1:34.321	Q
3	Szandra Lajtos	Hungary	1:34.677	
4	Tuende Balázs	Romania	1:38.669	

Heat 6

Rank	Athlete	Country	Time	Notes
1	Nina Yevteyeva	Russia	1:37.808	Q
2	Li Jianrou	China	1:37.966	Q
3	Patrycja Maliszewska	Poland	1:38.709	
4	Safiya Vlasova	Ukraine	1:39.084	

Heat 8

Rank	Athlete	Country	Time	Notes
1	Cho Ha-Ri	South Korea	1:40.644	Q
2	Annita van Doorn	Netherlands	1:41.608	Q
3	Magdalena Szwajlik	Poland	1:42.823	
4	Olena Pashchenko	Ukraine	1:42.831	

Heat 10

Rank	Athlete	Country	Time	Notes
1	Marianne St-Gelais	Canada	1:37.808	Q
2	Kateřina Novotná	Czech Republic	1:37.966	Q
3	Alex Whelbourne	United Kingdom	1:38.709	
4	Julia Riedel	Germany	1:39.084	

=== Quarterfinals ===
Top 2 Athletes from each heat qualified for Semifinals.

Heat 1

Rank	Athlete	Country	Time	Notes
1	Cho Ha-Ri	South Korea	1:33.241	Q
2	Arianna Fontana	Italy	1:33.474	Q
3	Jessica Hewitt	Canada	1:33.785	
4	Biba Sakurai	Japan	1:33.900	
5	Jorien ter Mors	Netherlands	1:34.113	

Heat 3

Rank	Athlete	Country	Time	Notes
1	Marianne St-Gelais	Canada	1:35.264	Q
2	Fan Kexin	China	1:35.294	Q
3	Yang Shin-young	South Korea	1:35.447	
4	Yui Sakai	Japan	1:35.593	
5	Lana Gehring	United States	2:00.897	ADV

Heat 2

Rank	Athlete	Country	Time	Notes
1	Katherine Reutter	United States	1:33.772	Q
2	Elise Christie	United Kingdom	1:33.953	Q
3	Liu Qiuhong	China	1:34.242	
4	Marie-Ève Drolet	Canada	1:34.527	
5	Annita van Doorn	Netherlands	1:35.736	

Heat 4

Rank	Athlete	Country	Time	Notes
1	Li Jianrou	China	1:37.524	Q
2	Park Seung-Hi	South Korea	1:37.663	Q
3	Nina Yevteyeva	Russia	1:38.010	
4	Kateřina Novotná	Czech Republic	1:38.455	
5	Bianca Walter	Germany	1:39.148	

=== Semifinals ===
Top 2 Athletes from each heat qualified for the Final.

Heat 1

Rank	Athlete	Country	Time	Notes
1	Katherine Reutter	United States	1:32.762	Q
2	Li Jianrou	China	1:32.937	Q
3	Elise Christie	United Kingdom	1:33.191	
4	Park Seung-Hi	South Korea	1:34.300	
5	Marianne St-Gelais	Canada	1:36.163	

Heat 2

Rank	Athlete	Country	Time	Notes
1	Cho Ha-Ri	South Korea	1:34.479	Q
2	Arianna Fontana	Italy	1:34.716	Q
3	Lana Gehring	United States	1:35.703	
–	Fan Kexin	China		PEN

=== Final ===
Rank	Athlete	Country	Time	Notes
1st place, gold medalist(s)	Cho Ha-Ri	South Korea	1:38.895	
2nd place, silver medalist(s)	Arianna Fontana	Italy	1:40.306	
3rd place, bronze medalist(s)	Katherine Reutter	United States	2:23.268	
–	Li Jianrou	China		YC
