= 2011 World Short Track Speed Skating Championships – Women's 1500 metres =

The women's 1500 metre at the 2011 World Short Track Speed Skating Championships took place 11 March at the Sheffield Arena.

== Results ==
=== Quarterfinals ===
Top 2 athletes from each heat and the next 2 fastest riders qualified for the semifinals.

Heat 1

| Rank | Athlete | Country | Time | Notes |
|---|---|---|---|---|
| 1 | Li Jianrou | China | 2:26.832 | Q |
| 2 | Park Seung-Hi | South Korea | 2:26.940 | Q |
| 3 | Marianne St-Gelais | Canada | 2:27.338 | q |
| 4 | Vera Antanenka | Belarus | 2:30.404 | |
| 5 | Yesl Jung | Australia | 2:30.454 | |

Heat 3

| Rank | Athlete | Country | Time | Notes |
|---|---|---|---|---|
| 1 | Fan Kexin | China | 2:33.760 | Q |
| 2 | Olga Belyakova | Russia | 2:34.489 | Q |
| 3 | Wang Xinyue | Hong Kong | 2:34.797 | |
| 4 | Ainara Equisoain | Spain | 2:45.064 | |
| 5 | Ottilia Sillo | Romania | 2:50.436 | |
| – | Martina Valcepina | Italy | | PEN |

Heat 5

| Rank | Athlete | Country | Time | Notes |
|---|---|---|---|---|
| 1 | Yang Shin-young | South Korea | 2:30.598 | Q |
| 2 | Bernadett Heidum | Hungary | 2:30.911 | Q |
| 3 | Marina Georgieva-Nikolova | Bulgaria | 2:32.279 | |
| 4 | Alex Whelbourne | United Kingdom | 2:33.002 | |
| 5 | Olena Pashchenko | Ukraine | 2:41.118 | |

Heat 7

| Rank | Athlete | Country | Time | Notes |
|---|---|---|---|---|
| 1 | Marie-Ève Drolet | Canada | 2:33.542 | Q |
| 2 | Nina Yevteyeva | Russia | 2:33.593 | Q |
| 3 | Veronika Windisch | Austria | 2:33.694 | |
| 4 | Yui Sakai | Japan | 2:34.074 | |
| 5 | Safiya Vlasova | Ukraine | 2:39.008 | |
| 6 | Chung Hsiao-Ying | Chinese Taipei | 2:41.946 | |

Heat 2

| Rank | Athlete | Country | Time | Notes |
|---|---|---|---|---|
| 1 | Arianna Fontana | Italy | 2:29.488 | Q |
| 2 | Kateřina Novotná | Czech Republic | 2:29.603 | Q |
| 3 | Lana Gehring | United States | 2:29.713 | |
| 4 | Bianca Walter | Germany | 2:34.606 | |
| 5 | Tuende Balázs | Romania | 2:35.190 | |
| 6 | Garazi Ganuza | Spain | 2:56.905 | |

Heat 4

| Rank | Athlete | Country | Time | Notes |
|---|---|---|---|---|
| 1 | Liu Qiuhong | China | 2:31.316 | Q |
| 2 | Annita van Doorn | Netherlands | 2:31.395 | Q |
| 3 | Szandra Lajtos | Hungary | 2:31.546 | |
| 4 | Patrycja Maliszewska | Poland | 2:32.240 | |
| 5 | Tatiana Bodova | Slovakia | 2:37.402 | |

Heat 6

| Rank | Athlete | Country | Time | Notes |
|---|---|---|---|---|
| 1 | Cho Ha-Ri | South Korea | 2:31.750 | Q |
| 2 | Jessica Hewitt | Canada | 2:31.819 | Q |
| 3 | Biba Sakurai | Japan | 2:31.976 | |
| 4 | Julia Riedel | Germany | 2:33.661 | |
| 5 | Raya Zaharieva | Bulgaria | 2:36.481 | |

Heat 8

| Rank | Athlete | Country | Time | Notes |
|---|---|---|---|---|
| 1 | Katherine Reutter | United States | 2:24.195 | Q |
| 2 | Elise Christie | United Kingdom | 2:24.702 | Q |
| 3 | Jorien ter Mors | Netherlands | 2:26.807 | q |
| 4 | Magdalena Szwajlik | Poland | 2:30.619 | |
| 5 | Volha Talayeva | Belarus | 2:31.183 | |

=== Semifinals ===
Top 2 athletes from each heat qualified for the final.

Heat 1

| Rank | Athlete | Country | Time | Notes |
|---|---|---|---|---|
| 1 | Yang Shin-young | South Korea | 2:33.297 | Q |
| 2 | Arianna Fontana | Italy | 2:33.402 | Q |
| 3 | Nina Yevteyeva | Russia | 2:33.762 | |
| 4 | Fan Kexin | China | 2:33.974 | |
| 5 | Kateřina Novotná | Czech Republic | 2:34.080 | |
| 6 | Marianne St-Gelais | Canada | 2:34.206 | |

Heat 3

| Rank | Athlete | Country | Time | Notes |
|---|---|---|---|---|
| 1 | Katherine Reutter | United States | 2:26.656 | Q |
| 2 | Park Seung-Hi | South Korea | 2:26.719 | Q |
| 3 | Marie-Ève Drolet | Canada | 2:26.880 | |
| 4 | Annita van Doorn | Netherlands | 2:26.952 | |
| 5 | Liu Qiuhong | China | 2:27.155 | |
| 6 | Olga Belyakova | Russia | 2:28.644 | |

Heat 2

| Rank | Athlete | Country | Time | Notes |
|---|---|---|---|---|
| 1 | Cho Ha-Ri | South Korea | 2:29.349 | Q |
| 2 | Li Jianrou | China | 2:29.435 | Q |
| 3 | Elise Christie | United Kingdom | 2:29.521 | |
| 4 | Jessica Hewitt | Canada | 2:29.738 | |
| 5 | Bernadett Heidum | Hungary | 2:32.129 | |
| 6 | Jorien ter Mors | Netherlands | 2:32.129 | |

=== Final ===
| Rank | Athlete | Country | Time | Notes |
|---|---|---|---|---|
| Gold medal | Katherine Reutter | United States | 2:33.978 | |
| Silver medal | Park Seung-Hi | South Korea | 2:34.218 | |
| Bronze medal | Cho Ha-Ri | South Korea | 2:34.336 | |
| 4 | Arianna Fontana | Italy | 2:34.424 | |
| 5 | Li Jianrou | China | 2:34.486 | |
| 6 | Yang Shin-young | South Korea | 2:35.418 | |
