= Jong-won =

- Hangul: 종원
- RR: Jongwon
- MR: Chongwŏn

Jong-won is a Korean given name. Notable people named Jong-won include:

- Choi Jong-won (born 1950), South Korean actor and politician
- Chon Jong-won (born 1996), South Korean sport climber
- Ha Jong-won (born 1942), North Korean football defender
- Kim Jong-won (born 1975), South Korean judoka
- Lee Jong-won (born 1969), South Korean actor
- Lee Jong-won (actor, born 1994) (born 1994), South Korean actor and model
- Lee Jong-won (footballer) (born 1989), South Korean football player
- Lee Jong-won (volleyball) (born 1952), South Korean former volleyball player
- Paik Jong-won (born 1966), South Korean chef
- Park Jong-won (director) (born 1960), South Korean film director and screenwriter
- Park Jong-won (footballer) (born 1955), South Korean footballer
- Son Jong-won (born 1984), South Korean chef

== See also ==
- Jung-won
- Jungwon (disambiguation)
