= Skadi (disambiguation) =

Skaði is a Scandinavian goddess.

Skadi may also refer to:

== Places ==
- Skadi (moon), a moon of Saturn
- Skadi Mons, formerly thought to be a mountain on Venus, disproven in 2025

== Other uses ==
- Skadi (rowing club), a rowing club from Rotterdam
- FV Skadi (1993–2011), a fish processing vessel
- Ruta Skadi, a character from Philip Pullman's His Dark Materials trilogy
- Skadi Walter (born 1964), German speed skater
- Skadi, a character in the video game Arknights
- SKADI, early avalanche transceiver product

== See also ==
- Skathi (disambiguation)
- Scad (disambiguation)
- Skade (Revelation Space), a character in Alastair Reynolds' Revelation Space novels including Redemption Ark
