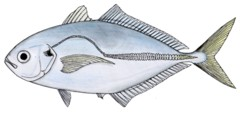

Conservation status
- Least Concern (IUCN 3.1)

Scientific classification
- Kingdom: Animalia
- Phylum: Chordata
- Class: Actinopterygii
- Order: Carangiformes
- Suborder: Carangoidei
- Family: Carangidae
- Genus: Alepes
- Species: A. apercna

Binomial name
- Alepes apercna E. M. Grant, 1987
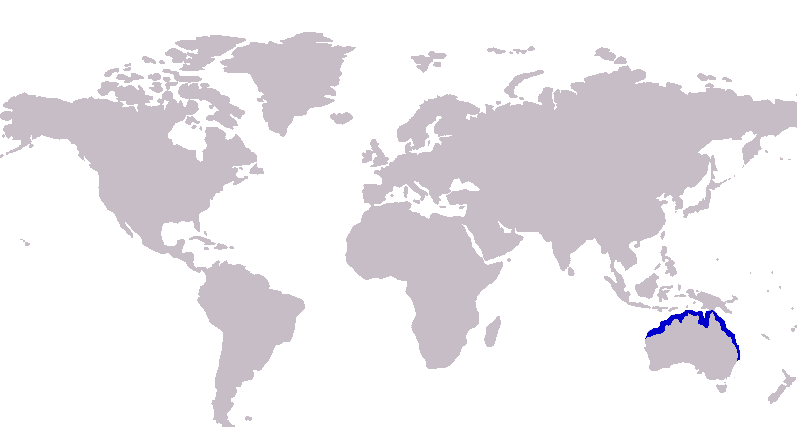
- Range of the smallmouth scad

= Smallmouth scad =

Species of fish

The smallmouth scad (Alepes apercna) (also known as the banded scad and roundfin trevally), is a species of tropical marine fish in the jack family Carangidae. The species is endemic to northern Australia, inhabiting primarily inshore waters. It is similar to other scads in the genus Alepes, and is distinguished by a well-developed posterior adipose eyelid, as well as fin membrane spotting and gill raker counts. It is not a large species, with the maximum length reported to be 29.5 cm. It feeds primarily on a variety of small invertebrates, and is of very minor economic importance.

== Taxonomy and naming ==
The smallmouth scad is one of five members in the scad genus Alepes, which is one of 33 genera of the jack family, Carangidae. The Carangidae are part of the order Carangiformes.

The smallmouth scad has a slightly confusing taxonomic history, with confusion over the classification, the author, and confusion with other species clouding the species past. The first specimen known to science was taken in 1984, and deposited in the Queensland Museum along with photographs of a juvenile as paratypes with no holotype designated. Grant described the species for the first time in 1987 in "Fishes of Australia", crediting the species to Smith-Vaniz, who presumably collected the specimen and wrote a brief description. However, Grant's description of the species is the first publication of the species, making him the correct author under the ICZN rules. Confusion over this species and Alepes kleinii led Sainsbury to refer to the species as Alepes sp., with the placement in the genus considered somewhat dubious. The type locality is listed only as Australia. The common name of the species is related to the small mouth size of the species, with the names banded scad and roundfin trevally used incorrectly, and this is partially due to confusion with A. kleinii, the true banded scad.

== Description ==
The smallmouth scad has an elongate oval to oblong shaped body which is strongly compressed. The snout is blunt, and both the ventral and dorsal profiles are equally convex. The dorsal and anal fins both have a low profile, and are not falcate, while the pectorals are falcate and extend beyond the junction of the curved and straight lateral line. The curved section of the lateral line is strongly arched, rising from the origin at the operculum and terminating at the junction with the straight section. A posterior adipose eyelid is well developed and reaches almost to the center of the eye, and the jaws are filled with fine teeth. The first dorsal fin has 8 spines, and the second dorsal has one spine and 24-26 soft rays. The anal fin has two separate spines posterior to the main anal fin which consists of one spine and 20 to 22 soft rays. There are 51-70 moderately protrusive scutes. It is similar to Atule mate, but lacks the adipose eyelid on both posterior and anterior sides of the orbit. It is also very similar to Alepes melanoptera and is distinguished from it by having dusky to hyaline dorsal intermembranes, compared to A. melanoptera's spotted membranes. Alepes vari is more similar still, and can be clearly distinguished by gill raker counts, having 27-30 compared to A. vari's 37. The largest specimen known was taken by the CSIRO and measured 29.5 cm.

The colour of the body is a blue to green blue above and silver below, with young specimens having dark vertical cross bars. The operculum has a diffuse dark blotch. The spinous and soft dorsal fins, anal fins and caudal fin are a dusky yellow green. The anterior of the soft dorsal and anal fins have white tips and the pelvic fin is a white to grey colour, while the pectoral is hyaline.

== Distribution and habitat ==
The smallmouth scad is known only from Australian waters, inhabiting the tropical north from Exmouth Gulf in Western Australia, north to the Northern Territory and east to Wide Bay in Queensland. There has been a single report of an individual as far down as Botany Bay in New South Wales. The species may also occur in the Gulf of Papua but has not yet reported. It is an abundant fish on the continental shelf in waters from 10 to 150 m in depth, rarely leading a pelagic lifestyle.

== Biology and fishery ==
Smallmouth scad are omnivorous, but take a high proportion of small invertebrates, primarily benthic crustaceans and molluscs. It also frequently ingests algae, a feature which is rare in the Carangidae. Nothing of the reproductive cycle is known. It is of little importance to fisheries, usually caught on hook and line tackle by commercial and recreational fishermen.
