= 2011 World Short Track Speed Skating Championships – Women's 3000 metres =

The women's 3000 metre at the 2011 World Short Track Speed Skating Championships took place March 13, 2011 at the Sheffield Arena.

== Results ==
=== Final ===
Rank	Athlete	Country	Time	Notes
Gold medal	Cho Ha-Ri	South Korea	5:13.353	
Silver medal	Katherine Reutter	United States	5:13.677	
Bronze medal	Liu Qiuhong	China	5:17.206	
4	Li Jianrou	China	5:17.730	
5	Park Seung-Hi	South Korea	5:20.163	
6	Yang Shin-young	South Korea	5:23.957	
7	Arianna Fontana	Italy	5:27.601	
8	Fan Kexin	China	5:29.497	
