= Michael Gilday =

Michael Gilday could refer to:

- Michael M. Gilday, U.S. Chief of Naval Operations
- Michael Gilday (speed skater) (born 1987), Canadian athlete
