= Short-track speed skating at the 2009 Winter Universiade =

Short track speed skating competition

Short track speed skating at the 2009 Winter Universiade was held from 19 to 23 February 2009 in the Harbin University of Science and Technology Gym.

== Men's events ==
Event	Gold		Silver		Bronze	
500 metres	Jang Won-hoon; South Korea	43.973	Gao Ming; China	44.436	Junji Ito; Japan	47.821
1000 metres	Lee Seung-hoon; South Korea	1:28.064	Guillaume Bastille; Canada	1:28.838	Ruslan Zakharov; Russia	1:29.131
1500 metres	Lee Seung-hoon; South Korea	2:18.061	Kim Seoung-il; South Korea	2:18.203	Yun Tae-sik; South Korea	2:33.511
3000 metres	Lee Seung-hoon; South Korea	5:25.608	Kim Seoung-il; South Korea	5:25.775	Yun Tae-sik; South Korea	5:26.187
5000 metre relay	China (CHN); Gao Ming; Chen Xin; Wang Hongyang; Zhang Zhiqiang	7:00.424	Canada (CAN); Guillaume Bastille; Alex Boisvert Lacroix; Richard Schoebridge; Tyler Derraugh	7:03.929	South Korea (KOR); Kim Seoung-il; Lee Seung-hoon; Jang Won-hoon; Yun Tae-sik	7:05.141

== Women's events ==
Event	Gold		Silver		Bronze	
500 metres	Liu Qiuhong; China	44.862	Li Wenwen; China	44.929	Meng Xiaoxue; China	45.084
1000 metres	Liu Qiuhong; China	1:31.657	Zhou Yang; China	1:31.679	Jung Ba-ra; South Korea	1:33.164
1500 metres	Zhou Yang; China	2:32.658	Liu Qiuhong; China	2:32.821	Sun Linlin; China	2:33.201
3000 metres	Choi Jung-won; South Korea	5:26.183	Liu Qiuhong; China	5:26.212	Kim Hye-kyung; South Korea	5:28.094
3000 metre relay	China (CHN); Zhou Yang; Sun Linlin; Meng Xiaoxue; Liu Qiuhong	4:18.676	South Korea (KOR); Yang Shin-young; Jung Ba-ra; Kim Hye-kyung; Choi Jung-won	4:22.824	Canada (CAN); Valérie Lambert; Annik Plamondon; Nita Avrith; Marie Andree	4:32.728

== Medals table ==
Rank	Nation	Gold	Silver	Bronze	Total
1	China	5	5	2	12
2	South Korea	5	3	5	13
3	Canada	0	2	1	3
4	Japan	0	0	1	1
4	Russia	0	0	1	1
Totals (5 entries)		10	10	10	30
