= Lee Jong-won (disambiguation) =

Lee Jong-won (Korean: 이종원) is a Korean name consisting of the family name Lee and the given name Jong-won. It may refer to:

- Lee Jong-won (born 1969), a South Korean actor
- Lee Jong-won (volleyball) (born 1952), a South Korean volleyball player
- Lee Jong-won (footballer) (born 1989), a South Korean football player
- Lee Jong-won (model) (born 1994), a South Korean model and actor

Fictional characters

- Lee Jong-won, a minor character who appeared in Prison Playbook, portrayed by Kang Seung-yoon
