= Jungwon =

Jungwon may refer to:

- Jungwon-gyeong, former name of Chungju, North Chungcheong, South Korea when it was a sub-capital during the United Silla dynasty
- Jungwon Province, one of the former provinces of Korea under the United Silla and Goryeo Dynasties, today North Chungcheong Province, South Korea
- Jungwon Air Base in Chungju
- Jungwon County, former county annexed by Chungju
- Jungwon-gu, Seongnam, Gyeonggi Province, South Korea
- Jung-won, Korean given name
