= World and Olympic records set at the 2018 Winter Olympics =

A number of world records (WR) and Olympic records (OR) were set in various skating events at the 2018 Winter Olympics in Pyeongchang, South Korea.

== Figure skating ==
The following new ISU best scores were set during this competition:

Event	Date	Component	Skater(s)	Country	Score	Ref
Team event	11 February	Short program	Evgenia Medvedeva	Olympic Athletes from Russia	81.06	
Pair skating	15 February	Free skating	Aliona Savchenko; Bruno Massot	Germany	159.31	
Ice dance	19 February	Short dance	Tessa Virtue; Scott Moir	Canada	83.67	
Ice dance	20 February	Free dance	Gabriella Papadakis; Guillaume Cizeron	France	123.35	
Ice dance	20 February	Total score	Tessa Virtue; Scott Moir	Canada	206.07	
Ladies' singles	21 February	Short program	Evgenia Medvedeva	Olympic Athletes from Russia	81.61	
Ladies' singles	21 February	Short program	Alina Zagitova	Olympic Athletes from Russia	82.92	

== Ice hockey ==
- On 13 February 2018, Jocelyne Lamoureux of the United States women's team scored two goals six seconds apart, an Olympic record for the shortest time between goals by any player.
- On 21 February 2018, Susanna Tapani of the Finnish women's team scored a goal ten seconds into the second period, an Olympic record for the shortest time for a goal scored after the beginning of a period.

== Short track speed skating ==
Twelve Olympic records (OR) and three world records (WR) were set during the competition.

Event	Date	Round	Athlete	Country	Time	Record	Ref
Men's 500 metres	20 February	Heat 1	Wu Dajing	China	40.264	OR	
Men's 500 metres	22 February	Quarterfinal 2	Wu Dajing	China	39.800	OR, WR	
Men's 500 metres	22 February	Final A	Wu Dajing	China	39.584	OR, WR	
Men's 1000 metres	13 February	Heat 5	Charles Hamelin	Canada	1:23.407	OR	
Men's 1500 metres	10 February	Final A	Lim Hyo-jun	South Korea	2:10.485	OR	
Men's 5000 metre relay	13 February	Semifinal 2	Hwang Dae-heon; Kim Do-kyoum; Kwak Yoon-gy; Lim Hyo-jun	South Korea	6:34.510	OR	
Men's 5000 metre relay	22 February	Final A	Shaoang Liu; Shaolin Sándor Liu; Viktor Knoch; Csaba Burján	Hungary	6:31.971	OR	
Women's 500 metres	10 February	Heat 8	Choi Min-jeong	South Korea	42.870	OR	
Women's 500 metres	13 February	Quarterfinal 2	Elise Christie	Great Britain	42.703	OR	
Women's 500 metres	13 February	Semifinal 1	Choi Min-jeong	South Korea	42.422	OR	
Women's 3000 metre relay	10 February	Semifinal 2	Fan Kexin; Han Yutong; Qu Chunyu; Zhou Yang	China	4:05.315	OR	
Women's 3000 metre relay	20 February	Final B	Suzanne Schulting; Jorien ter Mors; Lara van Ruijven; Yara van Kerkhof	Netherlands	4:03.471	OR, WR	

== Speed skating ==
Eight Olympic records (OR) and five Sea level world bests (WB) were set during the competition.

Event	Date	Round	Athlete	Country	Time	Record	Ref
Men's 500 metres	19 February	Pair 16	Håvard Holmefjord Lorentzen	Norway	34.41	OR	
Men's 5000 metres	11 February	Pair 10	Sven Kramer	Netherlands	6:09.76	OR	
Men's 10,000 metres	15 February	Pair 5	Ted-Jan Bloemen	Canada	12:39.77	OR	
Men's team pursuit	21 February	Semifinal 2	Håvard Bøkko; Simen Spieler Nilsen; Sverre Lunde Pedersen	Norway	3:37.08	OR; WB (sea level)	
Women's 500 metres	18 February	Pair 14	Nao Kodaira	Japan	36.94	OR; WB (sea level)	
Women's 1000 metres	14 February	Pair 12	Jorien ter Mors	Netherlands	1:13.56	OR; WB (sea level)	
Women's team pursuit	19 February	Quarterfinal 1	Antoinette de Jong; Marrit Leenstra; Ireen Wüst	Netherlands	2:55.61	OR; WB (sea level)	
Women's team pursuit	21 February	Final A	Ayano Sato; Miho Takagi; Nana Takagi	Japan	2:53.89	OR; WB (sea level)	
