= Valérie Lambert =

Short-track speed skater

Personal information
- Born: September 29, 1988 (age 37) Sherbrooke, Quebec, Canada

Sport
- Country: Canada
- Sport: Short track speed skating
Medal record
Women's short track speed skating
Representing Canada
Winter Universiade
Silver medal – second place	2011 Erzurum	500 m
Bronze medal – third place	2009 Harbin	3000 m relay
World Junior Championships
Bronze medal – third place	2007 Mladá Boleslav	Relay
Bronze medal – third place	2008 Bolzano	Relay

Valérie Lambert (born 29 September 1988) is a Canadian former short track speed skater. In the 2010–11 World Cup season, she achieved an individual podium which was 3rd place in the 500 m race. She also achieved four relay podiums at the World Cup. She is a two-time Universiade medallist.
