= Skathi =

Skathi may refer to:

- An anglicized form of the Old Norse goddess name Skaði
- Skadi Mons, a misidentified geologic feature on Venus
- Skathi (moon) is a tiny moon of Saturn discovered in 2000, named after the above goddess

== See also ==
- Skadi (disambiguation)
