= Maxime Chataignier =

French speed skater (born 1988)

Personal information
- Born: 15 September 1988 (age 37) Besançon, France
- Height: 5 ft 5 in (165 cm)
- Weight: 137 lb (62 kg)

Sport
- Country: France
- Sport: Short track speed skating

Achievements and titles
- Olympic finals: 1
- Highest world ranking: 1 (1500m)
Medal record
Men's short track speed skating
Representing France
European Championships
Bronze medal – third place	2010 Dresden	Overall
World Junior Championships
Silver medal – second place	2006 Miercurea-Ciuc	Overall

Maxime Chataignier (born 15 September 1988 in Besançon) is a French short-track speed-skater.

Chataignier competed at the 2006 and 2010 Winter Olympics for France. In 2006, he was disqualified his opening heat of the 1000 metres and finished 4th in his opening heat of the 1500 metres, failing to advance in both.

In the 2010 Olympics, he was disqualified in his opening heat of both the 1000 metres and 1500 metres, failing to advance. He was also part of the French 5000 metre relay team, which placed third in the semifinal, but was advanced to the final, where they finished 5th.

As of 2013, Chataignier's best performance at the World Championships came in 2011, when he finished 4th in the 1000 metres. He also won a silver medal as a member of the French relay team at the 2006 European Championships, and a gold with the relay team at the 2006 World Junior Championships.

As of 2013, Chataignier has five ISU Short Track Speed Skating World Cup podiums, with his best finish two silvers, one as part of the relay team in 2010–2011 at Montreal, and another in the 1000 metres at Changchun that season. He was also the overall champion in the 1500 metres in 2010–11.

== World Cup podiums ==
Date	Season	Location	Rank	Event
4 February 2007	2006–07	Heerenveen	3rd place, bronze medalist(s)	5000m Relay
24 October 2010	2010–11	Montreal	3rd place, bronze medalist(s)	1500m
24 October 2010	2010–11	Montreal	2nd place, silver medalist(s)	5000m Relay
30 October 2010	2010–11	Quebec	3rd place, bronze medalist(s)	1500m
5 December 2010	2010–11	Changchun	2nd place, silver medalist(s)	1000m
