= Anthony Lobello Jr. =

Short track speed skater

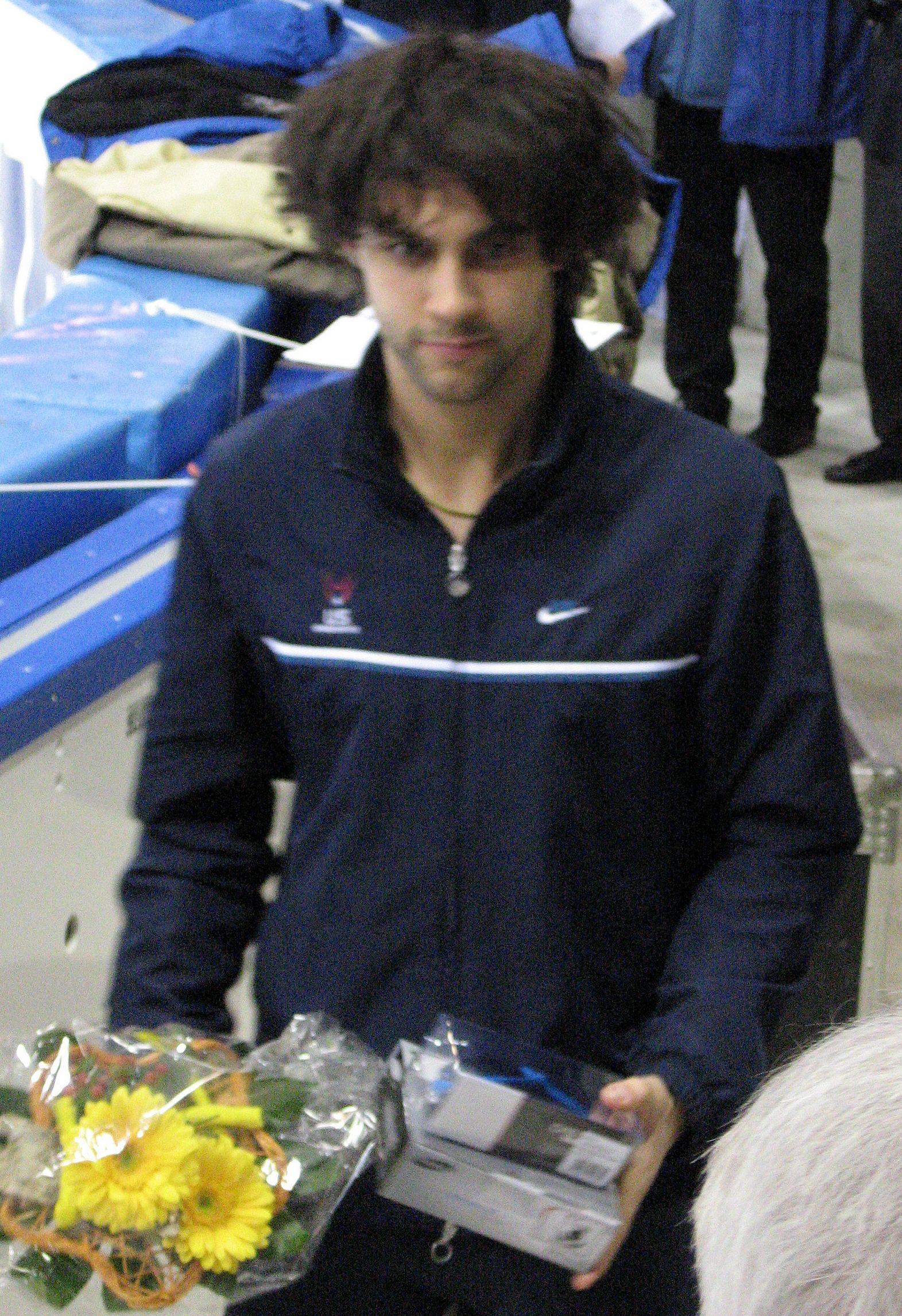
- Lobello at the 2008–09 ISU Short Track Speed Skating World Cup

Medal record

Men's short track speed skating

Representing the United States

World Championships
Bronze medal – third place	2006 Minneapolis	5000 m relay
Bronze medal – third place	2007 Milan	5000 m relay
Bronze medal – third place	2011 Sheffield	5000 m relay

Anthony J. Lobello Jr. (born August 15, 1984, in Tallahassee, Florida) is a retired short track speed skater, inline speed skater, and coach who competed for the United States at the 2006 Winter Olympics and for Italy at the 2014 Winter Olympics. He also competed in the US team's 2010 Olympics qualifying event, held in Marquette, Michigan in September 2009, although he was not selected for the team after being hampered by illness during the trials.

Lobello was educated at Holy Comforter Episcopal School and Maclay School: he was a keen athlete, competing in track and playing soccer as well as becoming an accomplished inline skater. In 2003 he started attending Northern Michigan University on a sports scholarship, with the aim of making the transition from roller to ice skating with the aim of competing at the Winter Olympics.

With only three years of speed skating experience prior to the 2006 Winter Olympic Games in Torino, Italy, Lobello surprised the field and made the team: he placed 23rd in the 500 meters at the Games. He was the highest ranking American (7th) in the 500-meter event for the 2008–2009 World Cup season, ahead of Olympic gold medalist Apolo Anton Ohno.

Lobello was named Colorado's Red-Hot Bachelor by Cosmopolitan magazine in 2005. Lobello was an undergraduate student at the University of Utah, majoring in communications. He began dating Italian skater Arianna Fontana in 2012: the couple were engaged the following year and married in May 2014 in Colico. The couple split their time between homes in Valtellina, Courmayeur and Lobello's hometown of Tallahassee.

After a troubled relationship with US Speedskating, Lobello elected to switch nationality to compete for Italy in 2012, being eligible through his Italian paternal grandfather. His appearance at the 2014 Games made him the first American sportsperson to compete for a second nation at a Winter Games having previously competed for the US national team (Rena Inoue, Clay Ives and Bengt Walden all competed for other nations at the Winter Olympics before representing the US). Following the 2014 Winter Olympics, Lobello began coaching Fontana after his retirement from competition, helping her to a gold medal in the 500 meters at the 2018 Winter Olympics in Pyongchang, South Korea.
