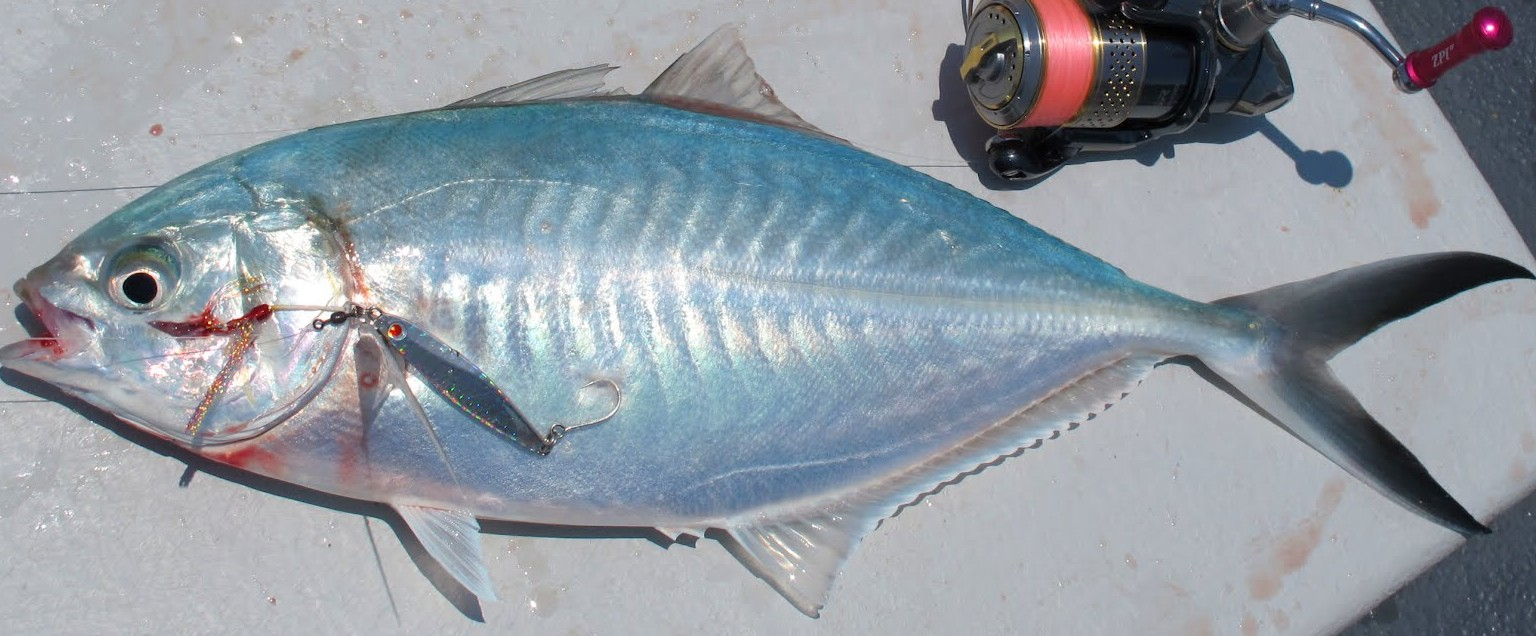

Conservation status
- Least Concern (IUCN 3.1)

Scientific classification
- Kingdom: Animalia
- Phylum: Chordata
- Class: Actinopterygii
- Division: Teleostei
- Order: Carangiformes
- Suborder: Carangoidei
- Family: Carangidae
- Genus: Alepes
- Species: A. vari

Binomial name
- Alepes vari (G. Cuvier, 1833)
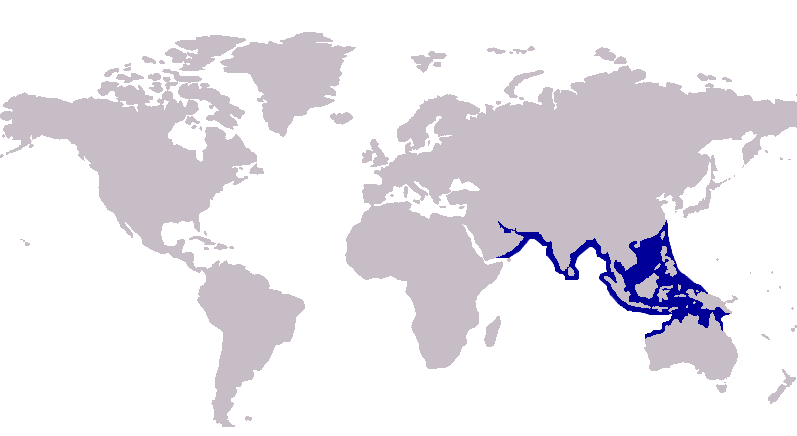
- Approximate range of the herring scad

Synonyms
- Caranx vari, G. Cuvier, 1833; Selar macrurus, Bleeker, 1851; Caranx macrurus, (Bleeker, 1851); Alepes macrurus, (Bleeker, 1851); Alepes glabra, Fowler, 1904

= Herring scad =

Species of fish

The herring scad (Alepes vari) (also known as the duskyfin crevalle and trevally scad), is a common species of tropical marine fish in the jack family Carangidae. The species inhabits the surface waters of coastal regions throughout the Indo-West Pacific region, feeding on a variety of crustaceans and small fishes. It is the largest fish of the scad genus Alepes, growing to a recorded length of 56 cm. The herring scad is identified among the genus Alepes by its more numerous and smaller scutes and the number of gill rakers on the first arch. It is of minor importance to fisheries throughout its range.

== Taxonomy and naming ==
The herring scad is one of five extant species in the scad genus Alepes, a group of fish in the jack family, Carangidae. The Carangidae are part of the order Carangiformes.

The species was first scientifically described by the French naturalist Georges Cuvier in 1833 from a specimen now lost to science. He named the species Caranx vari, believing the fish was closely affiliated with the large jacks of that genus. The species was later transferred to the scad genus Alepes by Gushiken in 1983, and a specimen from Puducherry, India was designated to be the lectotype the following year by Smith-Vaniz. The species was redescribed and renamed twice after Cuvier's description, first by Pieter Bleeker as Selar macrurus and then by Henry Fowler as Alepes glabra, both of which are junior synonyms discarded under ICZN rules. Although commonly called the 'herring scad', the names duskyfin crevalle, trevally scad and, incorrectly, blackfin scad (A. melanoptera) are applied to the species.

== Description ==
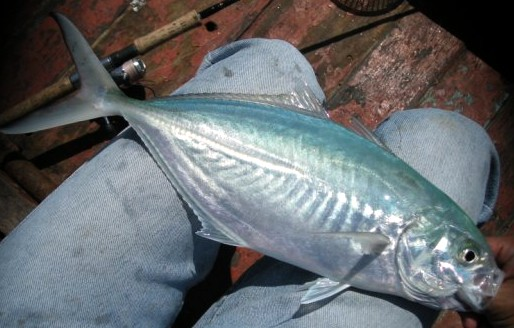
The herring scad is an ovate shape, commonly blue green above and silver below

The herring scad has a body profile very similar to other members of the genus Alepes, having a strongly compressed, ovate body. The ventral and dorsal profiles of the fish are almost evenly convex, joined anteriorally by a pointed snout. There are two separate dorsal fins, the first containing 8 spines while the second has a single spine followed by 24 to 27 soft rays. The anal fin consists of two anteriorally detached small spines followed by a single spine connected to 20 to 23 soft rays. The lateral line is strongly arched anteriorally with the junction of the curved and straight sections located the origin of second dorsal to the third soft ray. The curved section contains 42 to 50 scales and 0 to 2 scutes, while the straight section has 0 to 7 scales and 48 to 69 scutes. There is a well-developed adipose eyelid on the posterior half of the eye. The jaws hold a single row of numerous comb like teeth. There are 32 to 38 gill rakers and a total of 24 vertebrae. The herring scad is by far the largest species in Alepes, growing to 56 cm in total length, although is more commonly encountered at below 30 cm.

The species is an ash blue above, fading to a silvery white below, with a diffuse dusky blotch on margin of operculum. The fins are dusky with the exception of the spinous dorsal fin which is pale to dark dusky. The amount of dark pigment in the fins is sexually dimorphic, with males developing darker spinous dorsal fin, lobes of soft dorsal and anal fins, and pelvic fins than females.

== Distribution and habitat ==
The herring scad is distributed throughout tropical to subtropical regions of the Indo-West Pacific oceans. The species has been recorded from the Red Sea, eastward to Sri Lanka, India, Southeast Asia, China, Indonesia, the Philippines, New Guinea, and as far north as Taiwan and as far south as northern Australia. The herring scad is most commonly found in shallow coastal regions where it inhabits the surface layers of the ocean over a variety of substrates.

== Biology and fishery ==
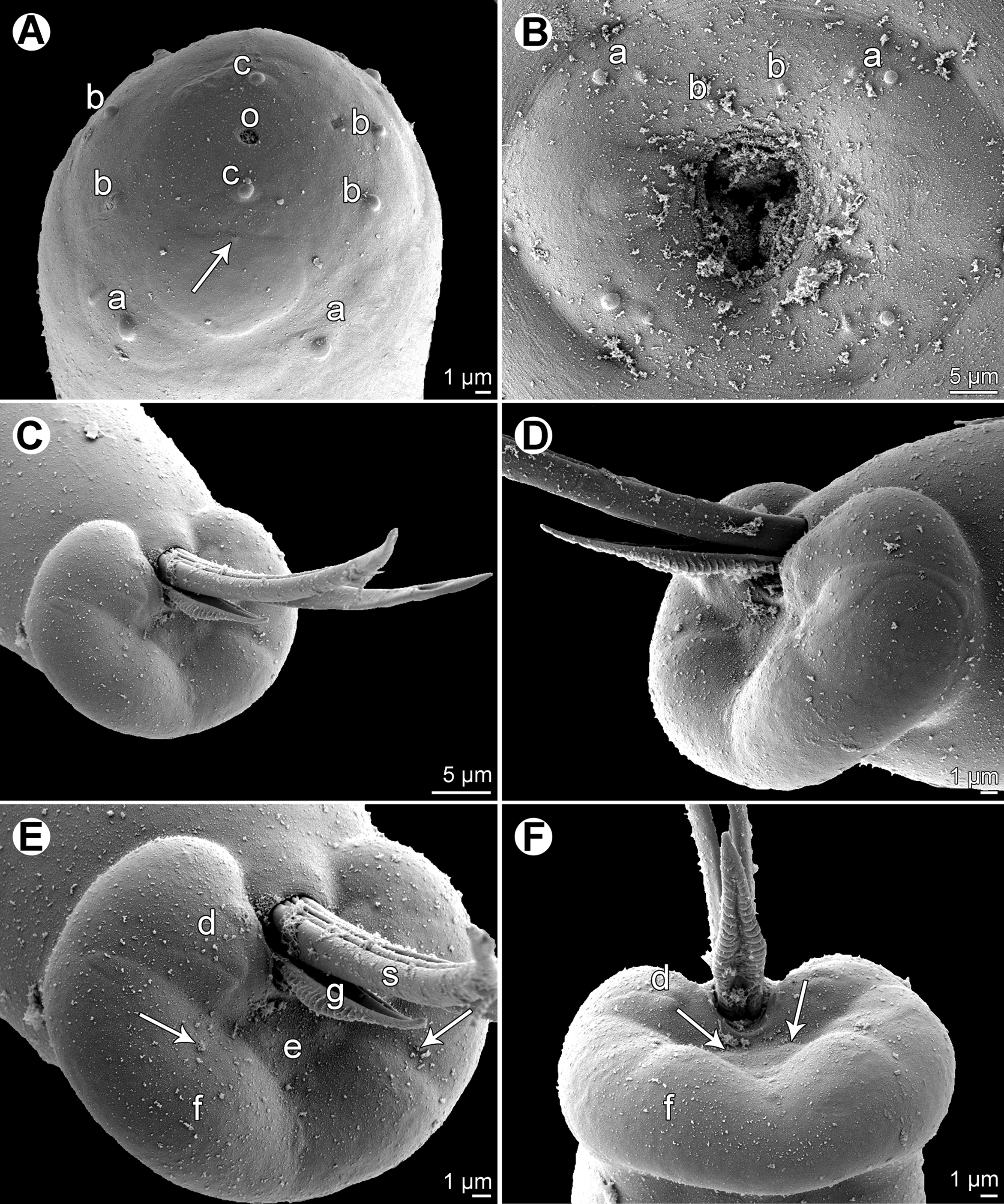
Philometra austropacifica (Nematoda, Philometridae), a parasite of the ovary of the herring scad. SEM.

The herring scad is a carnivorous species, known to consume a variety of crustaceans including shrimps, copepods and decapods as well as other small fishes. It is one of a number of pelagic fish from the Red Sea found to have high numbers of luminescent bacteria in its gut, living symbiotically with the fish as part of the gut flora.

Parasites of the herring scad include the philometrid nematode Philometra austropacifica, which lives inside the ovary of the females.

The species is of little importance to fisheries, taken occasionally on hook and line gear.
