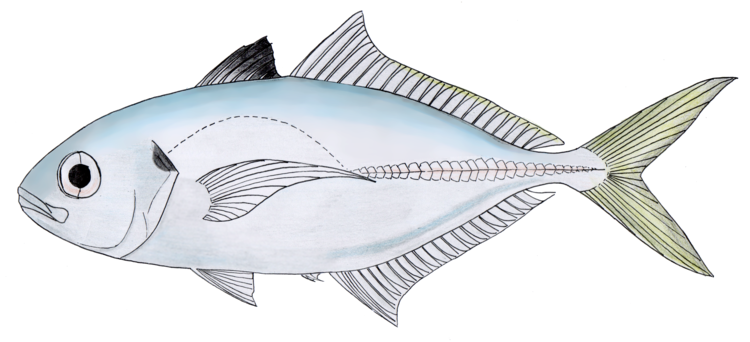

Conservation status
- Least Concern (IUCN 3.1)

Scientific classification
- Kingdom: Animalia
- Phylum: Chordata
- Class: Actinopterygii
- Order: Carangiformes
- Suborder: Carangoidei
- Family: Carangidae
- Genus: Alepes
- Species: A. melanoptera

Binomial name
- Alepes melanoptera (Swainson, 1839)
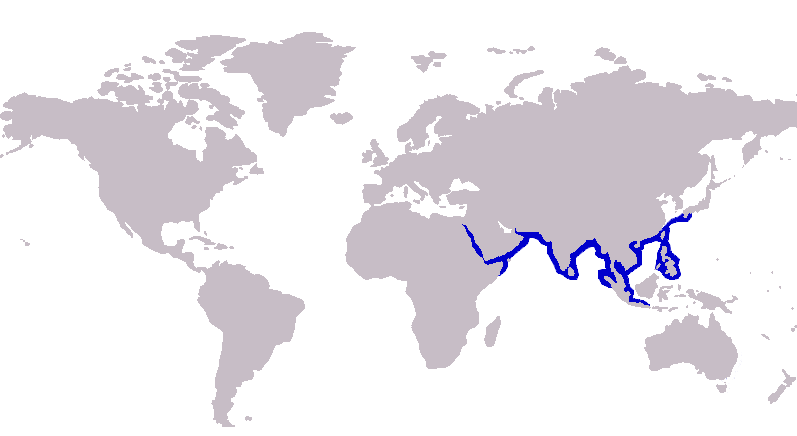
- Range of the blackfin scad

Synonyms
- Trachinus melanoptera, Swainson, 1839; Selar malam, Bleeker, 1851; Caranx malam, (Bleeker, 1851); Atule malam, (Bleeker, 1851); Alepes malam, (Bleeker, 1851); Caranx nigripinnis, (Day, 1876); Caranx pectoralis, (Chu & Cheng, 1958); Atule pectoralis, (Chu & Cheng, 1958)

= Blackfin scad =

Species of fish

The blackfin scad (Alepes melanoptera) (also known as the shortfinned trevally and Chinese trevally) is a species of tropical marine fish of the jack family Carangidae. The species inhabits inshore waters throughout the Indo-Pacific region, although is rare in the western Indian Ocean. It is not a large species, with the largest reported capture being 25 cm, and it is distinguished readily from similar species by the prominent black dorsal fin. It is a predator which feeds on planktonic crustaceans, but little else is known of its biology. The blackfin scad is a minor food fish throughout its range, and is highly valued in Cambodia and Thailand.

== Taxonomy and naming ==
The blackfin scad is one of five species in the scad genus Alepes, which is one of 33 genera of the jack family, Carangidae. The Carangidae are part of the order Carangiformes.

The species was first scientifically described by the English naturalist William Swainson under the name of Trachinus melanoptera, placing the species in a new genus which was found to be already in use by an unrelated species of fish. The species was therefore subsequently placed in the new combination of Alepes melanoptera, becoming the type species of the new genus Alepes. After Swainson's initial description, Pieter Bleeker unknowingly redescribed the species as Selar malam, a name which was revised three times before it too was assigned to Alepes. The species was redescribed twice more by Day in 1876 and Chu and Chen in 1958. Being Swainson is the first author to correctly describe the fish, even though he initially ascribed it to the wrong genus, the ICZN recognises Alepes melanoptera as the correct name, and the rest as invalid junior synonyms. Such synonymy is common in the genus Alepes due to the abundance of similar genera. The specific name 'melanoptera' literally means 'black wing' in Greek; a reference to its distinctive colouration.

== Description ==
The blackfin scad has a body profile very similar to that of the other round scads of the genus Alepes, in particular to Alepes apercna, but can be distinguished quite easily by the prominent black colouration of the dorsal fin. The species has a tendency, like other carangids, to become more elongated with age, thus changing their body proportions slightly. It has an oblong, compressed body with dorsal and ventral profiles that are nearly equally convex in shape. The nose somewhat blunter than others in the genus, and has a mouth full of numerous comb like teeth. Like other members of Alepes, it has an adipose eyelid which is well developed only on the posterior section of the eye. The dorsal fin is split into two sections like in all of the Carangidae, the first with 7 or 8 spines and the second with one spine followed by 23 to 26 soft rays. The anal fin consists of two detached spines followed by a single spine and 18 to 21 soft rays, with both the anal and dorsal fins have a low profile. The pectoral fin is falcate and extends to beyond the junction of the curved and straight sections of the lateral line. The lateral line itself is strongly arched anteriorally, with the curved and straight sections of the line intersecting just after the commencement of the spinous dorsal fin. The curved section of the lateral line holds 31 to 50 scales and up to 2 scutes, while the straight section holds up to 4 scales and 49 to 69 scutes. The gill rakers number 24 to 30 and the species has 24 vertebrae. The blackfin scad has a maximum known length of 25 cm.

The upper body of the fish is silvery blue above grading to a silvery white below with a diffuse black spot. The membranes of the first, spinous dorsal fin are black, giving the species its common name. All other fins are pale to hyaline with the exception of the caudal fin which is a dusky yellow with darker edges.

== Distribution and habitat ==
The blackfin scad is distributed throughout parts of the tropical and subtropical Indo-Pacific region. The species has been recorded as far west as the Persian Gulf (Kuwait) and has a seemingly sparse distribution in the western Indian Ocean up to India and Sri Lanka. It is common around the Asian coast, Malaysia, Thailand, Philippines and as far south as Indonesia. The northernmost captures have been made in Okinawa, Japan and a specimen has also been collected off Taiwan. The species frequents inshore habitats, not found in the open ocean.

== Biology and fisheries ==
The biology and ecology of the blackfin scad are poorly studied, although the diet of the species is known. The species is a planktivorous predator, consuming a variety of pelagic shrimps, prawns and copepods.

The species is caught mainly by hook and line methods but is not considered a major commercial species in any regions. Despite this, the fish is highly esteemed in Cambodia and Thailand, where it is fried, steamed or baked. It may also be salted or dried.
