= Kim Dam-min =

South Korean speed skater

Medal record

Women's short track speed skating

Representing South Korea

World Team Championships
Gold medal – first place	2011 Warsaw	Team

Asian Winter Games
Silver medal – second place	2011 Astana-Almaty	3000 m relay

Kim Dam-Min (Korean: 김담민; Hanja: 金潭民; born February 6, 1995) is a short track speed skater who competes for South Korea.

== Career ==
In 2010, Kim was chosen by the South Korea national team at the age of 15. She won one gold, two silvers and four bronze medals at the World Cup. At the 2011 Asian Winter Games, she also won silver in 3000 m relay. She also won a gold medal at the 2011 World Team Championships in Warsaw.
