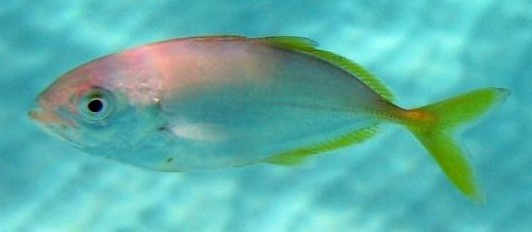

Conservation status
- Least Concern (IUCN 3.1)

Scientific classification
- Kingdom: Animalia
- Phylum: Chordata
- Class: Actinopterygii
- Division: Teleostei
- Order: Carangiformes
- Suborder: Carangoidei
- Family: Carangidae
- Genus: Alepes
- Species: A. djedaba

Binomial name
- Alepes djedaba (Forsskål, 1775)
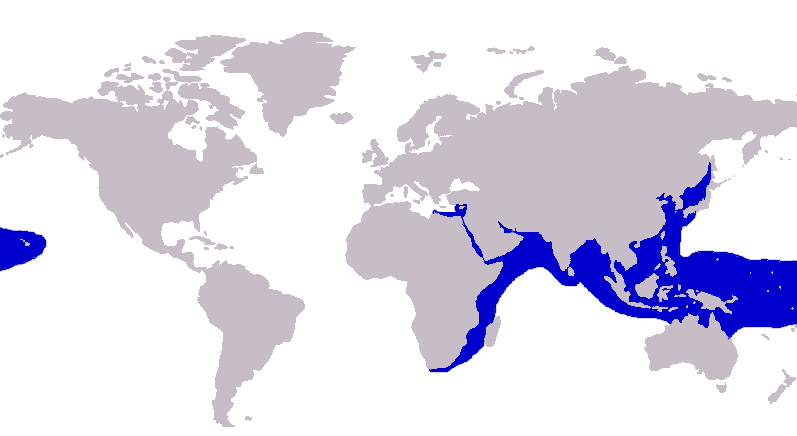
- Range of the shrimp scad

Synonyms
- Scomber djedaba, Forsskål, 1775; Atule djedaba, (Forsskål, 1775); Selar djedaba, (Forsskål, 1775); Atule kalla, (Cuvier, 1833); Caranx kalla, (Cuvier, 1833); Caranx microbrachium, (Fowler, 1934)

= Shrimp scad =

Species of fish

The shrimp scad (Alepes djedaba) (also known as the slender yellowtail kingfish), is a species of widespread tropical marine fish of the jack family, Carangidae. The shrimp scad is widely distributed in the tropical and subtropical western Indian Ocean and areas of the eastern Pacific Ocean, ranging from South Africa in the west to Hawaii in the east, including Japan and Australia to the north and south. The species is commonly found on inshore reefs and sandy substrates. It has the common body profile of a scad, and may be difficult to differentiate from others in the genus Alepes. It is one of the larger scads, growing to 40 cm, but often is encountered at much smaller sizes. The shrimp scad often forms large schools, and is carnivorous, consuming a variety of crustaceans and small fish. It is of moderate importance to fisheries throughout its range.

== Taxonomy and naming ==
The shrimp scad is one of five species of fish in the scad genus Alepes, which itself is one of thirty genera in the jack family Carangidae. The Carangidae are part of the order Carangiformes. A molecular phylogenetic study has confirmed the genus Alepes is supported, at least between A. djedaba and A. kleinii which are closely related.

The shrimp scad was first scientifically described by Swedish naturalist Peter Forsskål from a specimen collected in the Red Sea in 1775, which was designated to be the holotype. He named the species Scomber djedaba, placing it in the mackerel genus, a common practice with carangids at the time, as the family Carangidae was yet to be erected. A number of taxonomists have since tried to reclassify the species in a more parsimonious genus, with a number of carangid genera proposed including Selar, Caranx and Atule. To add to the confusion over the species, the species was redescribed twice after the first naming, once by Cuvier who named it Caranx kalla, and once by Fowler who proposed Caranx microbrachium for the species. Caranx kalla was subsequently placed in the genus Atule, but is now considered, along with Caranx microbrachium to be a junior synonym, unacceptable under the ICZN rules and has been discarded. The currently accepted name of Alepes djedaba was proposed by Gushiken in an extensive review of the carangidae of Japan, identifying a number of morphological features associating it with Alepes. Due to the awkward species name, the species is often misspelt as djeddaba in the literature.

== Description ==
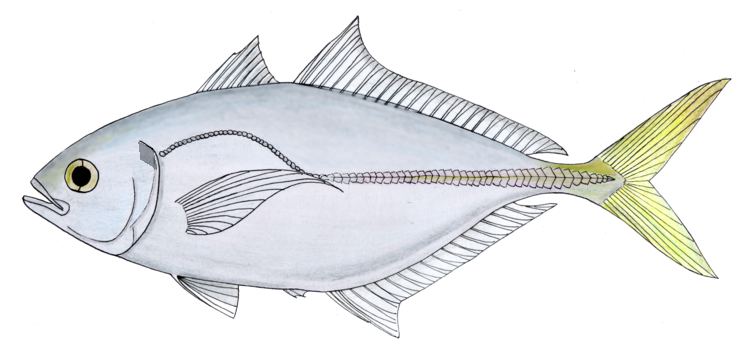

The shrimp scad is can grow to a large size compared to other scads, reaching a maximum known length of 40 cm, but more often seen around 25 cm. The shrimp scad has a body profile very similar to other scads and some other carangids, with an oblong, compressed body and dorsal and ventral profiles which are almost evenly convex. The snout is pointed and the eye diameter is nearly equal to the snout length, with an adipose eyelid well developed on the posterior half of eye. There are two moderately high, separate dorsal fins, the first of which has eight spines, while the second has a single spine followed by 23 to 25 soft rays. The anal fin has two detached spines followed by one spine connected to 18 to 20 soft rays. The anterior section of the lateral line is strongly curved, containing thirty one to thirty six scales, while the straight section consists of seventy seven to eighty five scutes.

The colour of the body is an overall silver colour, with a green-blue tone on the upper body, while the underside fades to a more white colour. There is a diffuse dusky blotch on margin of operculum which is bordered by a smaller white spot. The spinous dorsal fin, including the last dorsal fin spine is blackish or dusky, the soft dorsal fin is blackish or dusky above the scaly sheath and the margin of first to fourth upper soft rays is whitish. The middle portion of the anal fin below the scaly sheath is slightly blackish or dusk. The caudal fin is often a striking yellow, especially when fresh, with the upper caudal lobe often fading to a darker shade. The posterior scutes may also be a yellow to rusty colour, especially after removal from the water.

== Distribution and habitat ==
The Shrimp scad is present in the Indo-Pacific region from the Red Sea and east Africa to the Hawaiian Islands, north to Japan and south to Australia. Observed in the Mediterranean Sea since it was recorded first off Palestine in 1927 as Caranx calla, it later extended to the Aegean Sea, Egypt, Libya and Tunisia. It is also recorded in the Marmara Sea. The species is primarily an inshore inhabitant of reefs and over open sand patches, even in moderately turbid waters, often forming large schools. The species has in isolated circumstances also been found close to shore in surf zones in Japan and in estuarine waters in South Africa. The species is occasionally found in offshore environments, suggesting it can lead a pelagic lifestyle also.

== Biology and fishery ==
The shrimp scad is known to be a migratory species, with records from India indicating the fish resides and feeds in the waters of Madras from September to May, before migrating elsewhere to spawn. The shrimp scad feeds on a variety of prey, with at least two shifts in diet occurring as the fish mature. Older individuals feed mainly on young fishes, crustaceans like decapods, ostracods, amphipods and cladocerans with minor amounts of nematodes, insect body parts and insect larvae taken. Fish within a length range of 150–199 mm and 240–319 mm showed a preference for young fishes, while those in the length range of 200–239 mm primarily consumed ostracods and other crustaceans. Based on the food items taken, the species is an active midwater feeder. There is less food consumed during breeding season, which is indicative of reduced feeding activity during that period. Sexual maturity is attained by about 17 cm fork length and spawning is thought to occur in shallow coastal waters.

The species is of moderate commercial interest in most countries where it is often considered too small to be worthwhile and is often caught on hook and line tackle and in seines as bycatch. In Indian fisheries, the shrimp scad accounts for 43% of the carangid catch in purse seines, however is rarely taken by trawls or gill nets. It is also often taken by subsistence fisheries using various traditional gear such as inter-tidal fixed stake traps. Around the Asian and Indonesian coasts, larger numbers are taken than anywhere else in its range and it is considered a good eating fish.

== Utilization ==
Fishery: Trade; Game: Fishing
