= Katherine Reutter =

American speed skater (born 1988)

Katherine Reutter-Adamek
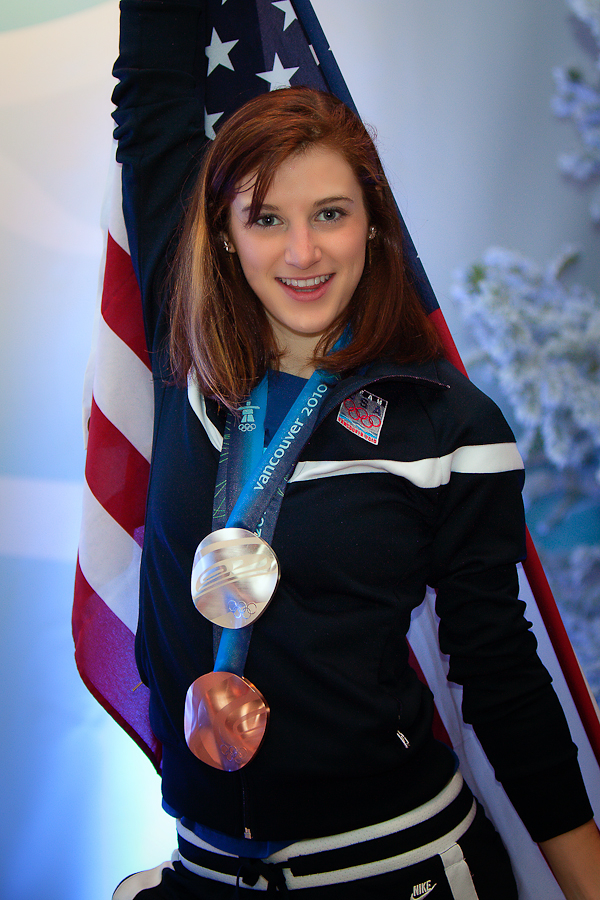
- Reutter with her Olympic medals (February 2010)

Personal information
- Born: July 30, 1988 (age 38) Champaign, Illinois
- Height: 5 ft 7 in (1.70 m)
- Weight: 132 lb (60 kg)

Sport
- Country: United States
- Sport: Speed skating
- World Cup wins: 2010–11 overall
Medal record
Women's short track speed skating
Representing the United States
Olympic Games
Silver medal – second place	2010 Vancouver	1000 m
Bronze medal – third place	2010 Vancouver	3000 m relay
World Championships
Gold medal – first place	2011 Sheffield	1500 m
Silver medal – second place	2011 Sheffield	Overall
Silver medal – second place	2011 Sheffield	3000 m
Bronze medal – third place	2008 Gangneung	3000 m
Bronze medal – third place	2010 Sofia	1000 m
Bronze medal – third place	2010 Sofia	3000 m relay
Bronze medal – third place	2011 Sheffield	1000 m
World Team Championships
Bronze medal – third place	2009 Heerenveen	Team
Bronze medal – third place	2011 Warsaw	Team

Katherine Reutter-Adamek (née Reutter /ˈrɔɪtər/ ROY-tər; born July 30, 1988) is an American short track speed skater. She is a two-time medalist (one silver, one bronze) in the Winter Olympics, 2011 overall world silver medalist and the 2010–2011 overall ISU Short Track Speed Skating World Cup champion.

At the 2010 Winter Olympics, Reutter won silver in the 1000 m and bronze in the 3000 m relay. She has won one gold, two silvers, and four bronze medals at the World Championships, including overall silver medal at the 2011 World Championships. She has also won two bronze medals at the World Team Championships.

== Early life ==
Reutter was born and raised in Champaign, Illinois. Reutter was inspired to become a speed skater after meeting five-time Olympic gold medalist Bonnie Blair at her high school. She learned to skate with her mother during a figure skating class when she was four years old, but immediately found she was more interested in speed skating. Reutter first started speed skating professionally in 2005 at the age of 17. She began training at the Olympic Training Center in Marquette, Michigan that year. Reutter graduated from Champaign Centennial High School in 2006. She trained in Salt Lake City, Utah starting 2007, where she paid for room, board, and training at her own expense, until her retirement in 2013 when she moved to Milwaukee, Wisconsin.

== Career ==
=== 2008–2009 ===
At the 2008 World Short Track Speed Skating Championships, Reutter won a bronze medal in the 3000 m with a time of 5:46.518, finishing behind Zhou Yang and Jung Eun-Ju.

In February 2009, Reutter completed a 1000 m race in 1:29.667 in Dresden, Germany. It was less than 0.2 of a second short of the world record set the previous year by Chinese short track speed skater Wang Meng. At the 2009 World Short Track Speed Skating Team Championships, in March 2009, Reutter won a bronze medal along with Kimberly Derrick, Alyson Dudek, Lana Gehring, and Jessica Smith.

Reutter won four silver medals at the 2009 Short Track Speed Skating World Cup. She won the women's 1500 m at the 2009–10 Short Track Speed Skating World Cup on November 7, 2009, finishing in 2:23.275, beating Cho Ha-Ri of South Korea. Reutter made the 2010 U.S. Olympic team after winning the 1000 and 1500 m at the 2010 U.S. Olympic Team Trials in September 2009.

=== 2010 Winter Olympics ===
Reutter ranked 1st in her qualifying heats for the 500 m with a time of 44.187. She then set an Olympic record in the first quarterfinal with a time of 43.834 but the record was beaten by Wang Meng of China in the next heat, with a time of 43.284. Reutter started slow in the semifinals, resulting in a fourth-place finish, eliminating her from medal contention. She finished seventh overall in the women's 500 m.

Reutter competed in the semifinals for the 3000 m relay with teammates Alyson Dudek, Allison Baver and Kimberly Derrick. The U.S. team qualified for the final in second place behind South Korea with a time of 4:15.376. Reutter finished in fourth place in the 1500 m final, behind Zhou Yang of China, with Lee Eun-Byul of South Korea in second, and Park Seung-Hi of South Korea in third. Reutter got tangled up with Wang Meng in the semifinal, causing both skaters and Cho Ha-Ri of South Korea to fall, resulting in Meng being disqualified from the final. Reutter repeated the same move in the final, bumping into Park, and later expressed remorse for both mistakes, stating "I think the room was there but maybe I just wasn't there. I don't know. But … I messed up and messed up some people around me, which I'm very sorry for." In the heats of the 1000 m, Reutter set an Olympic record and finished first overall in the heats. About an hour and a half later, Reutter competed in the 3000 m relay (with Allison Baver, Alyson Dudek, Lana Gehring) and won bronze behind China and Canada due to the disqualification of South Korea. In the final of the 1000 m, Reutter was edged out for the gold medal by Wang Meng, finishing behind her 1:29.324 to 1:29.213.

=== 2010 World Short Track Speed Skating Championships ===
At the 2010 World Short Track Speed Skating Championships, in Sofia, Bulgaria, Reutter, who was fighting the flu, won bronze medals in the 1000 m and the 3000 m relay. In her first event, the 1000 m, Reutter placed third with a time of 1:31.747, finishing behind Wang Meng and Cho Ha-Ri. Reutter then combined with Alyson Dudek, Kimberly Derrick, and Lana Gehring in the 3000 m relay to finish third behind South Korea and Canada with a time of 4:14.231. Reutter also placed 6th in the 500 m, 4th in the 1500 m, and 4th in the 3000 m.

=== 2011 World Short Track Speed Skating Championships ===
At the 2011 World Short Track Speed Skating Championships in Sheffield, England, Reutter won one gold, two silvers, and one bronze. She finished second overall with 68 points. In her first event, the 1500 m, Reutter won the gold ahead of Koreans Park Seung-Hi and Cho Ha-Ri in a time of 2:33.978. In winning the gold, Reutter became the first American woman to win a gold medal at a World Short Track Speed Skating Championships since Bonnie Blair did in 1986. After the 1500 m, Reutter competed in the 3000 m relay semifinals but fell during the race, resulting in the United States not advancing to the final. In her next event, the 500 m, Reutter did not advance past the semifinals, finishing 6th overall. In the 1000 m, Reutter finished in third place behind Cho Ha-Ri and Italian Arianna Fontana in a time of 2:23.268 even though she tripped on a lane block. In her last event, the 3000 m, Reutter just missed the gold medal, finishing behind Cho Ha-Ri 5:13.677 to 5:13.353.

=== 2013 retirement ===
In early 2013 due to constant injuries, Reutter announced her retirement at the age of 24. After that, she became a coach at the Pettit National Ice Center.

=== 2016 return to competition ===
In mid-2016, Reutter announced her return to competition with the goal of competing in the 2018 Olympics in PyeongChang, South Korea. She was training at the Pettit Center in Milwaukee. Her dreams of competing in the 2018 Olympics came to a crash when she suffered a concussion and had to miss Pre-Olympics qualifying in 2017 and retiring again.

== Appearances and endorsements ==
Reutter appeared as a guest on Comedy Central's The Colbert Report on December 14, 2009. Host Stephen Colbert autographed her thigh, an idea by Reutter that initially caught the comedian off guard (Although Reutter's website suggest that it was her manager's idea and they had discussed it with Colbert beforehand). Colbert began raising funds for the U.S. Speedskating team when their sponsor, the Dutch DSB Bank, went bankrupt.

In the lead up to the 2018 Olympics, Reutter was sponsored by TLC The Littleton Clinic, Rosencutter Ultra Fitness, and Performance. Reutter's past sponsors include U.S. Speedskating, Verizon, EyeCare 20/20, Bioenergy Ribose, Nike, Oakley and the Champaign Police Department, who helped pay the costs of her training in Utah.

== Personal life ==
As of 2021, Reutter lived in Milwaukee with her husband, Mark Adamek.
