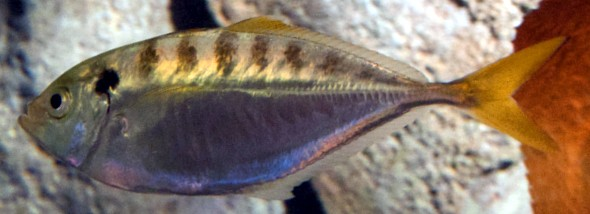

Conservation status
- Least Concern (IUCN 3.1)

Scientific classification
- Kingdom: Animalia
- Phylum: Chordata
- Class: Actinopterygii
- Division: Teleostei
- Order: Carangiformes
- Suborder: Carangoidei
- Family: Carangidae
- Genus: Alepes
- Species: A. kleinii

Binomial name
- Alepes kleinii (Bloch, 1793)
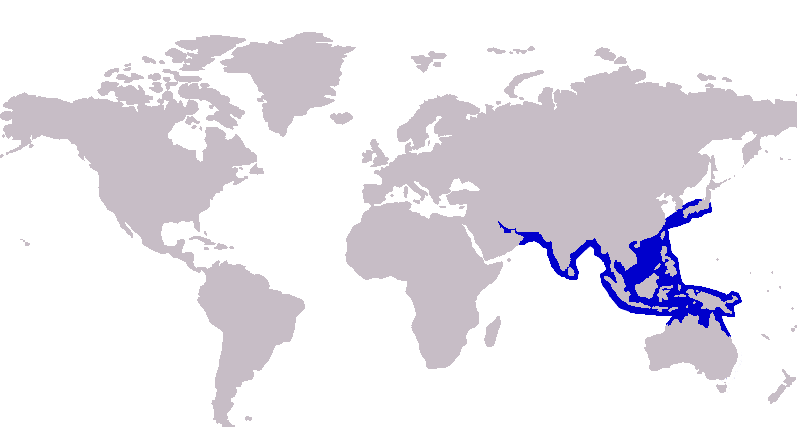
- Approximate range of the razor belly scad

Synonyms
- Scomber kleinii Bloch, 1793; Caranx kleinii (Bloch, 1793); Caranx para Cuvier, 1833; Alepes para (Cuvier, 1833); Caranx microchir Cuvier, 1833; Caranx kalla, Cuvier, 1833; Alepes kalla, (Cuvier, 1833); Selar megalaspis, (Bleeker, 1853); Alepes megalaspis, (Bleeker, 1853); Micropteryx queenslandiae, (De Vis, 1884); Caranx miyakamii, (Wakiya, 1924)

= Razorbelly scad =

Species of fish

The razorbelly scad (Alepes kleinii) (also known as the banded scad, golden scad and goggle-eye scad) is a small species of tropical marine fish in the jack family, Carangidae. The species inhabits coastal waters in the Indo-Pacific, from Pakistan in the west to Japan and Australia in the east, often found over reefs. The razorbelly scad has a complex taxonomic history, and even recently has had its position in the genus Alepes challenged, but appears to be stable after a molecular phylogeny study supported its placement in Alepes. It is very similar to other scads in the same genus, but is readily identified by its unique teeth. Razorbelly scad are predatory fish, taking a variety of crustaceans and shrimps, and show a change in feeding intensity over the year. Reproduction and development have been extensively studied in India, where spawning occurs in a single event from January to September. The species is commonly taken in tropical fisheries, where it is marketed fresh or dried.

== Taxonomy and naming ==
The razorbelly scad is classified in the scad genus Alepes, which is part of the jack family, Carangidae. The Carangidae are part of the order Carangiformes.

Like a number of other members of Alepes, the razorbelly scad suffers from a complicated taxonomic history, in which the species has been described and named no less than seven times, and has had three of those names reassigned to different genera. The first person to describe and name the species was the German naturalist Marcus Elieser Bloch in 1793, assigning the name Scomber kleinii putting the species in a genus of mackerel. This was later transferred to the jack genus Caranx and finally to the genus Alepes, which William Swainson had created in 1839. This is the currently accepted name, as Bloch was the first to describe the fish, even though he put it in the wrong genus. In a marathon effort of synonymy, Georges Cuvier described the species under three separate names in 1833, of which two were reclassified into Alepes, forming the commonly used junior synonyms of Alepes para and Alepes kalla. The razorbelly scad was described and named three times after Cuvier's efforts by Bleeker, De Vis and Wakiya. In a 1942 review of Caranx kalla, Nichols tried to separate and rationalise a number of synonyms, even suggesting a subspecies of De Vis' Caranx queenslandiae be created. The type specimen of A. kleinii was collected from the Malabar Coast off India. Although commonly called razorbelly scad, and recognised as such by Fishbase, the species also is known as banded scad, goggle-eye scad and golden scad.

The identity of the person honoured in the specific name is not known but it is almost certainly the German jurist, historian, botanist, zoologist and mathematician Jacob Theodor Klein (1685–1759), who was the author of a 5-volume history of fishes published in 1740–1749, who was also honoured by Bloch in the name Chaetodon kleinii.

=== Phylogeny ===
Although the species, including many of its synonyms, has been placed in the genus Alepes for some time, the nature of its teeth has made this placement controversial. Two authors have argued that the species should be reassigned to a new monotypic genus due to it having short conical teeth in comparison to the rest of Alepes' comblike teeth. This problem was addressed in a molecular phylogenetic study of the Carangidae in which A. kleinii and A. djedaba (Shrimp scad) were included. The results confirmed the placement of A. kleinii in Alepes, with the authors arguing the two species were too closely related to warrant placement in a new genus.

== Description ==
The razorbelly scad has a series of bars on the upper body

The razorbelly scad is similar in body shape and profile to the rest of Alepes, possessing a strongly compressed ovate body. The dorsal profile of the body is definitively less convex than the ventral profile, giving the upper and lower parts of the body an asymmetry which is further heightened by the different sized lobes of the caudal fin. The head of the fish tapers to a pointed snout, with the large eye having a well-developed posterior adipose eyelid. The teeth of the fish are a major diagnostic feature of the species, with the upper jaw having two irregular rows of small conical teeth at the front of the mouth, transitioning to a paving of blunt teeth at the back. The lower jaw is similar, having two rows of short conical teeth in the front of the jaw changing to one row of blunter teeth further back. There are two separate dorsal fins, the first containing eight weak spines while the second consists of a single spine followed by 23 to 26 soft rays. The anal fin has two detached spines anterior to the main section, which consists of a single spine followed by 19 to 22 soft rays. The upper caudal fin lobe is larger than the lower lobe, whilst the pelvic fin is quite small in comparison to those of other carangids. The lateral line is strongly arched anteriorally, with the arched and straight sections of the line intersecting below the fourth to sixth soft dorsal rays. The curved section of the line contains 32 to 46 scales and up to 2 scutes, while the straight section consists of 35 to 45 scutes and up to 2 scales. The species has 24 vertebrae and a total of 38 to 44 gill rakers. It is a fairly small fish compared to most carangids, only known to reach 16 cm in length.

Whilst alive, the razorbelly scad is a bluish grey to greenish grey on the upper body, becoming lighter and more silvery ventrally. Dark vertical bands are sometimes present on the body above the lateral line, and a large black spot is present on the upper operculum and surrounding shoulder region. The fins are pale to hyaline with the exception of the caudal fin which is yellow to dusky in colour, with the upper lobe generally brighter and having a narrow dusky edge.

== Distribution and habitat ==
The razorbelly scad is broadly distributed over the tropical Eastern Indo-West Pacific region, not as widely distributed as most of the genus Alepes. The species has been recorded from the Red Sea in the west, but is rarely found west of Pakistan. It is common along the Indian, Sri Lankan and South East Asian coasts, extending throughout Indonesia, Philippines, Taiwan, reaching as far north as Japan and as far south as northern Australia. As Caranx kalla, the species was recorded at least once in the Mediterranean Sea, passing through the Suez Canal from the Red Sea as part of the Lessepsian migration. The species inhabits inshore coastal environments, especially reef habitats.

== Biology and fishery ==
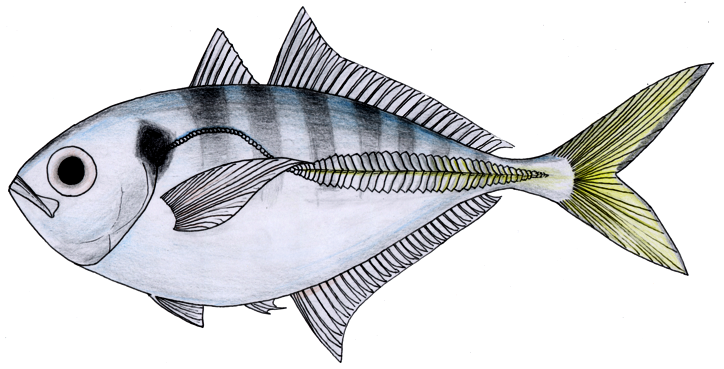
Illustration of the razorbelly scad

The razorbelly scad is a predatory fish, whose feeding activity changes, at least in some regions, over the course of a year. A 1988 study in Indian waters found that the species is an active feeder during February and March, showing only moderate activity for the rest of the year. Their main prey items were small crustaceans, particularly copepods and small or larval fish, with smaller amounts of Lucifer, prawns, amphipods and fish eggs taken.

Reproduction and spawning in the species has been studied only in Indian waters, where razorbelly scad spawn in a single event from January to September, with peaks in February and in June to August. The eggs are pelagic, spherical and transparent, measuring 0.58 to 0.61 mm in diameter. Newly hatched larvae are 1.13 mm in diameter, and the developmental biology of the larvae has been well studied. The fecundity of the species has been shown to be correlated with total length and body weight. The growth of razorbelly scad was also studied off the Indian coast near Mangalore. It was found the species grows to 83–84 mm in its first year, 131 mm in the second and 143 mm in the third year of its life. From the data collected, the growth curve predicts a maximum size of 17.1 cm, although it would require a long lifespan. Each sex reaches sexual maturity at a different size, in males it is 128.5 mm and 126.5 mm in females.

The species is commonly taken as part of a number of fisheries, although catch data is not available. It is taken by methods including hook and line, gill nets as well as other subsistence fishing gear. Razorbelly scad is marketed fresh and dried salted.
