= Pavillon Guy-Lafleur =

Ice arena in Quebec City, Quebec

Coordinates: 46°49′38″N 71°14′53″W

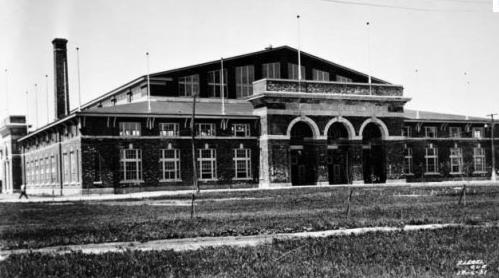

The Pavillon Guy-Lafleur, formerly Pavillon de la Jeunesse, (1970-2024) is an indoor arena, in Quebec City, Quebec on the grounds of ExpoCité. It opened in 1931 as an amphitheatre to replace the Victoria Park Arena destroyed in 1943, it was referred to as Pavillon de l'agriculture (1931 to 1970) for use for agricultural displays for the provincial exhibition or Expo Quebec. Since the 1980s it has been used as a sports venue and has a capacity of 5,000 spectators. It was damaged in a fire in 1949 resulting in restoration work in 1949–1950. The current ice surface was added in 1969–1970.

The Quebec Remparts played a few games here in their last season before folding and has been used by current Quebec Remparts for pre-season games.

It was used by the basketball team Quebec Kebekwa from 2006 to 2009.

Renovations in 2007 have replaced the front entrance with a modern design that mimics the original façade and the taller original roof is now a simpler metal roof structure.

The venue is now used for multiple indoor sports events or concerts. The venue was renamed for Guy Lafleur.
