= Holy Comforter Episcopal School =

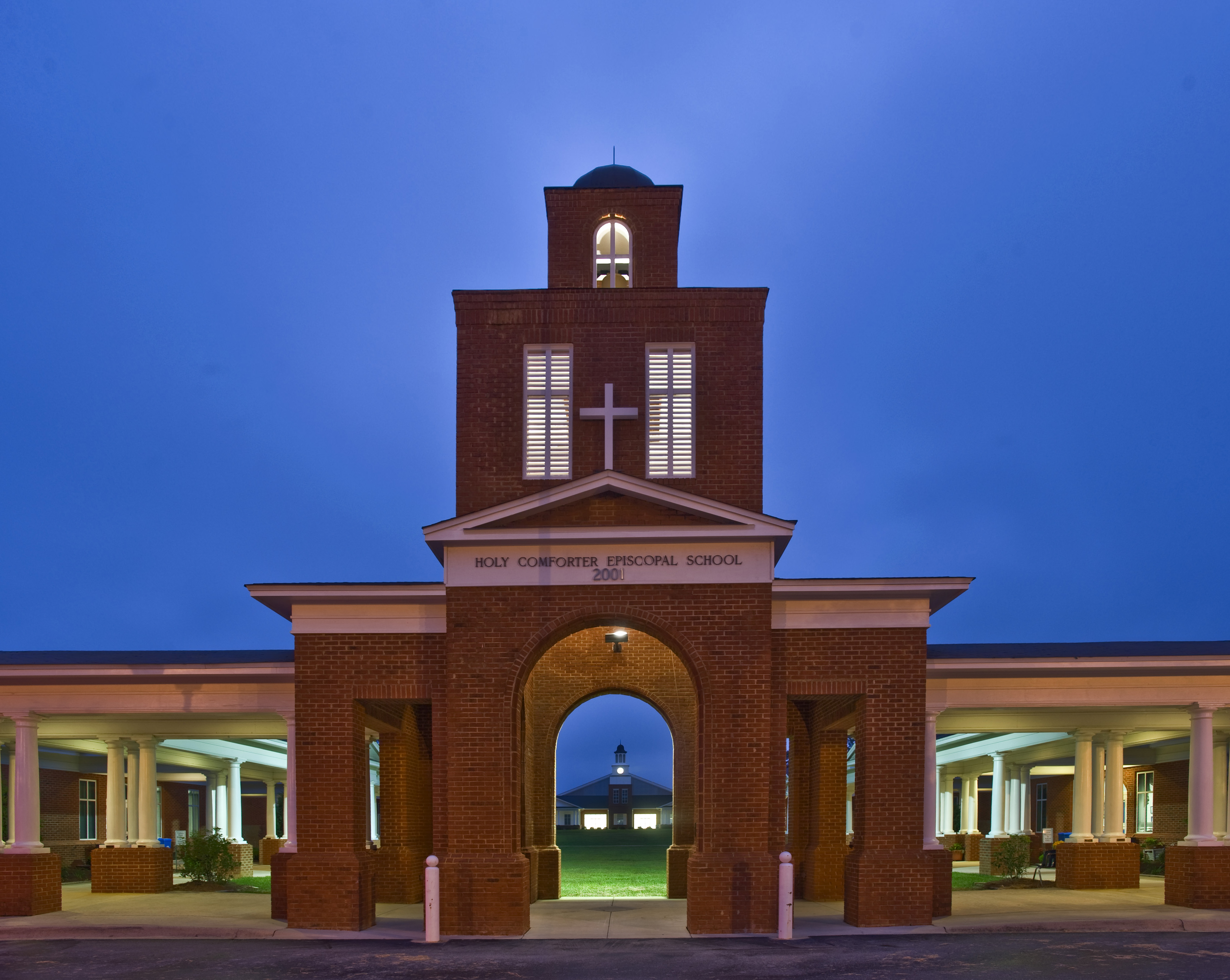

Location
- 2001 Fleischmann Road; Tallahassee, Florida 32308; United States; 30°28′52″N 84°13′23″W,

Information
- Type: Private
- Established: 1955
- Principal: Peter Klekamp
- Grades: PK3 - 8
- Enrollment: ~ 548
- Colors: Red, White, and Blue
- Mascot: Crusaders
- Website: School website
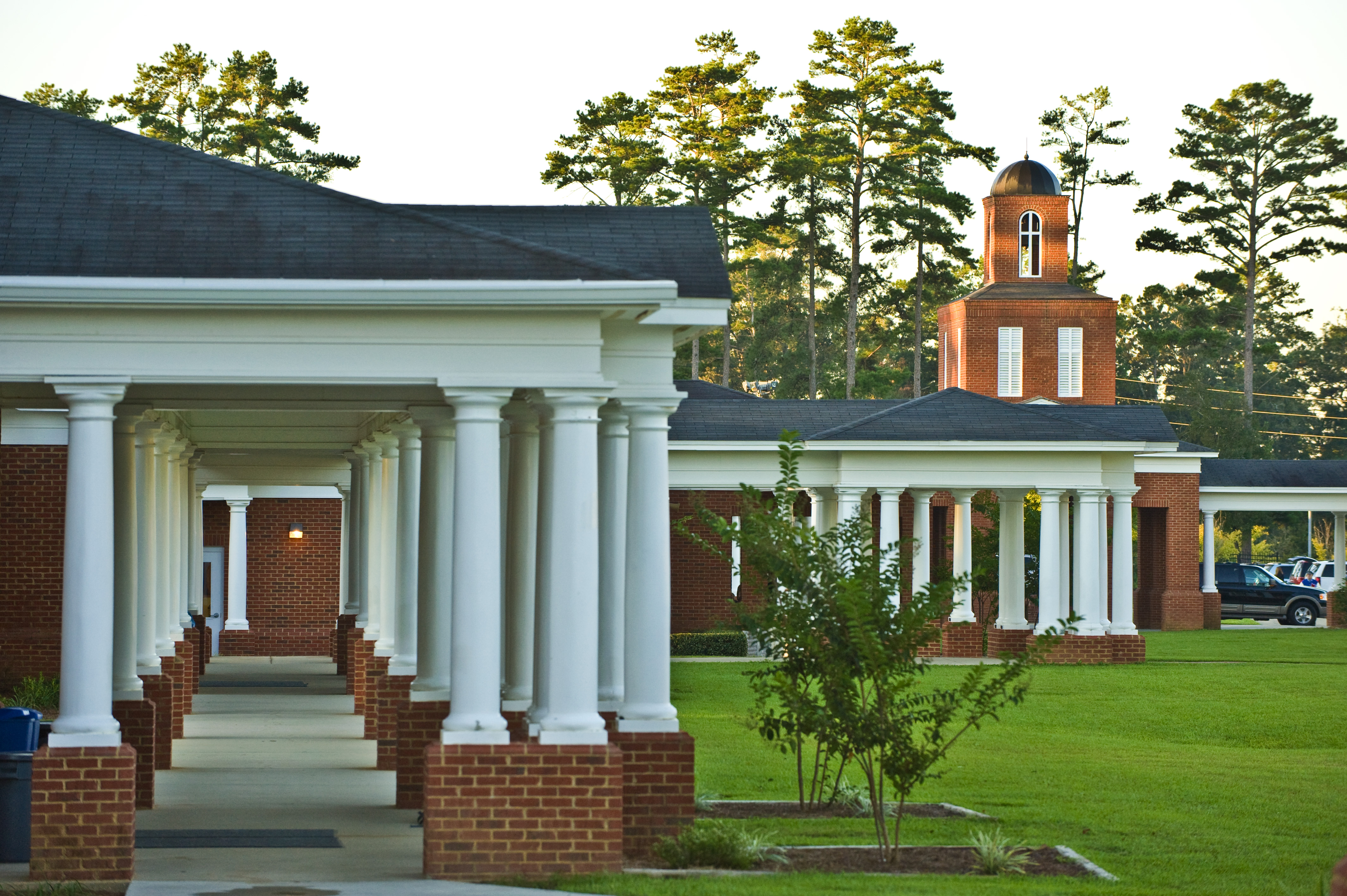

Holy Comforter Episcopal School is a private, Episcopal, coed school in Tallahassee, Florida, located on about 80 acres (0.32 km^{2}) of land in Leon County, Florida, about 7 miles (10 km) northeast of the state capitol building in Tallahassee, FL.

== History ==
Holy Comforter Episcopal School began with the arrival of Father Frank Pisani in the Spring of 1955. Upon completing a Theological Seminary in Alexandria, Va; Warren served as rector at Holy Comforter Episcopal Church in Tallahassee. The school began as a kindergarten held in the basement of the Holy Comforter parish with 25 children and one instructor. Since then, the school has grown to incorporate grades PreK - 8, with a student body of about 548 students. Holy Comforter Episcopal School is accredited by the Southern Association of Colleges and Schools (SACS), the Florida Council of Independent Schools (FCIS), the Florida Kindergarten Council (FKC), Southern Association of Independent Schools (SAIS), and the Board of Regents of the Episcopal Diocese of Florida.

== Students ==
Approximately 550 students are enrolled annually at the school, which includes all grades from Pre-K through 8. There are 50 teaching faculty and guidance counselors at Holy Comforter Episcopal School.
