= Jung-won =

- Hangul: 정원
- RR: Jeongwon
- MR: Chŏngwŏn
- IPA: [tɕʌŋwʌn]

Jung-won, also spelled Jeong-won, is a Korean given name.

== People ==
People with this name include:

- Kim Jung-won (born 1931), South Korean politician
- Ha Jung-won (born 1942), North Korean football defender
- Park Jung-won (born 1962), South Korean businessman, chairman of Doosan Group
- Choi Jung-won (actress, born 1969), South Korean actress
- Seo Jung-won (born 1970), South Korean football coach
- Moon Jeong-won (born 1980), South Korean florist and wife of Lee Hwi-jae
- Choi Jung-won (actress, born 1981), South Korean actress
- Choi Jung-won (singer) (born 1981), South Korean singer
- Cha Jung-won (born Cha Mi-young, 1989), South Korean actress
- Choi Jung-won (speed skater) (born 1990), South Korean female short track speed skater
- Yang Jung-won (born 2004), South Korean singer, member of Enhypen

== Fictional characters ==
Fictional characters with this name include:

- Jung-won, male lead character in 1998 South Korean film Christmas in August
- Kang Jung-won, male lead character in 2003 South Korean film The Uninvited
- Yoo Jung-won, female character in 2008 South Korean film Do Re Mi Fa So La Ti Do
- Ahn Jeong-won, male lead character in 2020 South Korean drama Hospital Playlist

== See also ==
- List of Korean given names
- Hanam Jungwon (하남중원; 1876–1951), dharma name of Korean Buddhist monk
- Kim Jung-won (김중원; born 1973), North Korean long-distance runner
- Lee Jung-won (이중원; born 1989), South Korean male football fullback (K-League)
