= Skadi Walter =

German speed skater (1964–2023)

Personal information
- Nationality: German
- Born: 18 April 1964; Halle, East Germany
- Died: 23 September 2023 (aged 59); Dresden, Germany

Sport
- Sport: Speed skating

Skadi Walter (18 April 1964 – 23 September 2023) was a German speed skater. She competed in the women's 500 metres at the 1984 Winter Olympics. Her daughter is the speed skater Bianca Walter.

Walter died on 23 September 2023, at the age of 59.
