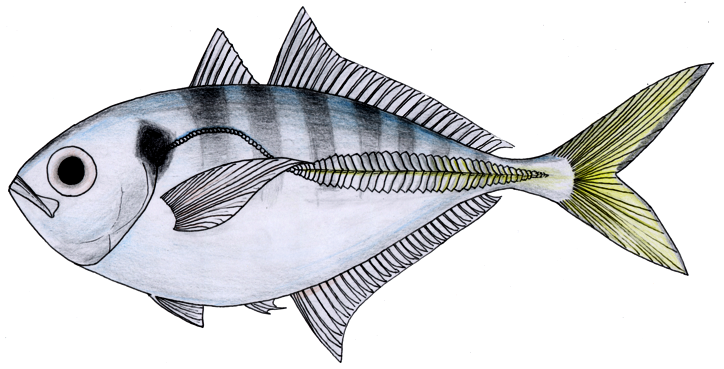
- Razorbelly scad

Scientific classification
- Kingdom: Animalia
- Phylum: Chordata
- Class: Actinopterygii
- Division: Teleostei
- Order: Carangiformes
- Suborder: Carangoidei
- Family: Carangidae
- Subfamily: Caranginae
- Genus: Alepes; Swainson, 1839

Type species
- Trachinus melanoptera, Swainson, 1839

Species
- See text

Synonyms
- Branchialepes Fowler, 1938; Rastrum Fowler, 1904

= Alepes =

Alepes Temporal range: 23–0 Ma Miocene to Present

Genus of fishes

Alepes is a genus containing five extant species of tropical marine fishes in the jack family, Carangidae. They are commonly known as scads, a term applied to many genera of carangid fishes. Their body form, however, differs from these other scads by being much more ovate in shape, more similar to the larger jacks taken as game fish, although scads are generally much smaller. They are found in coastal waters throughout the Indo-West Pacific region.

== Taxonomy and phylogeny ==
Alepes is a genus containing five extant and one extinct species. It is part of the jack family, the Carangidae are part of the order Carangiformes. Recent phylogenetic studies using molecular information have placed Alepes in the subfamily Caranginae (or the tribe Carangini). The most comprehensive study suggests the genus is basal to all other 'scads' and 'horse mackerels' of the genera Trachurus, Decapterus, and Selar, whilst still being closely affiliated with larger members of Caranginae such as Caranx.

Alepes was first created in 1839 by the English naturalist William Swainson, after he initially proposed it to be a subgenus of Trachinus, which he had created to accommodate Trachinus melanoptera, a species he had just described. Trachinus was invalid, however, as it was already in use for a genus of weevers. This makes A. melanoptera the type species of the genus. The other species currently placed in Alepes were not directly classified in the genus, but were transferred from other, often distantly related genera. Many of these species have numerous junior synonyms. "Alepes" comes from the Greek word alepis, 'without scales'.

A single species has been identified from the fossil record; Alepes pin (Bannikov, 1985), described from the Lower Miocene in eastern Crimean Oblast. This area was once part of the Indian Ocean which extended well into Europe at the time.

== Species ==
There are currently five recognized species in this genus:

Image	Scientific name	Common name	Distribution
	Alepes apercna E. M. Grant, 1987	Smallmouth scad	Australian waters, inhabiting the tropical north from Exmouth Gulf in Western Australia, north to the Northern Territory and east to Wide Bay in Queensland.
	Alepes djedaba (Forsskål, 1775)	Shrimp scad	Tropical and subtropical western Indian Ocean and areas of the eastern Pacific Ocean, ranging from South Africa in the west to Hawaii in the east, including Japan and Australia to the north and south
	Alepes kleinii (Bloch, 1793)	Razorbelly scad	Coastal waters in the Indo-Pacific, from Pakistan in the west to Japan and Australia in the east
	Alepes melanoptera (Swainson, 1839)	Blackfin scad	Tropical and subtropical Indo-Pacific region.
	Alepes vari (G. Cuvier, 1833)	Herring scad	Coastal regions throughout the Indo-West Pacific region

== Biology ==
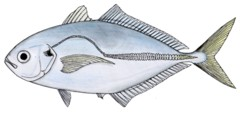
Smallmouth scad, Alepes apercna

The species in Alepes are all relatively small fish, with the largest, A. vari, growing to 56 centimetres (22 in). The other species are much more often encountered at sizes below 20 centimetres (8 in). They have strongly compressed ovate to oblong shaped bodies, with fin arrangements much like the rest of the Carangidae. They have two dorsal fins, the first consisting of weak spines and the second of a single spine followed by a number of soft rays. The anal fin has two detached spines anterior to the main section which consists of one spine and a number of soft rays. Their lateral lines have a moderate to strong anterior curve, with scutes present on the straight section of the lateral line. They are all a blue-green-grey above, fading to silvery white below. Only one, A. kleinni has bands or markings.

The fish in Alepes are all predators, taking a range of crustaceans including copepods, decapods, prawns and shrimp, as well as small fish. At least one species shows a change in feeding intensity over the period of a year. The reproduction of most species is unstudied, except for A. kleinii. This species spawns on a single event over a period of a few months, releasing small transparent, pelagic eggs. Natural spawning behavior in the genus is unknown.

== Distribution and habitat ==
The members of Alepes are all distributed in the tropical to subtropical regions of the Indo-West Pacific region. Their ranges overlap along the Indian, Asian and Indonesian coastlines, although some are distributed as far south as South Africa and northern Australia, while others extend as far north as Japan. Two species, A. djedaba and A. kleinii are known to inhabit the Red Sea, and have passed into the Mediterranean Sea through the Suez Canal as part of the Lessepsian migration. They are all coastal species, not found in the open ocean.

== Relationship to humans ==
The species of Alepes are not of major commercial interest, although Alepes kleinii appears to be taken in substantial enough numbers in India to warrant extensive research. They are taken by a variety of fishing methods including hook and line, trawls and a variety of netting methods. Their flesh is of good quality, and some regions regard various species as high quality and market them fresh, or dried and salted. They are of no interest to recreational fishermen, although occasionally taken as bait or bycatch.
