= Michael Gilday (speed skater) =

Canadian speed skater

Personal information
- Born: 5 January 1987 (age 39) Iqaluit, Northwest Territories (now Nunavut), Canada
- Height: 175 cm (5 ft 9 in)
- Weight: 73 kg (161 lb)
- Website: mgilday.com (archived)

Sport
- Country: Canada
- Club: Yellowknife Speed Skating Club
Medal record
Men's short track speed skating
Representing Canada
World Championships
Gold medal – first place	2011 Sheffield	5000 m relay
Gold medal – first place	2013 Debrecen	5000 m relay

Michael Gilday (born January 5, 1987) is a Canadian former short track speed skater from Yellowknife, Northwest Territories.

After missing a spot on the Vancouver 2010 team by just 13 one-hundredths of a second, Gilday competed at the Sochi Olympics in the 1500m and 5000m relay. He finished 17th in the 1500m after a disqualification in the semi-finals and he finished in 6th as part of the 5000m relay. Michael retired from short track speed skating after the Olympics.

Michael Gilday was inducted into the NWT Sport Hall of Fame in 2017.
