= Choi Jung-won (actress, born 1969) =

South Korean actress

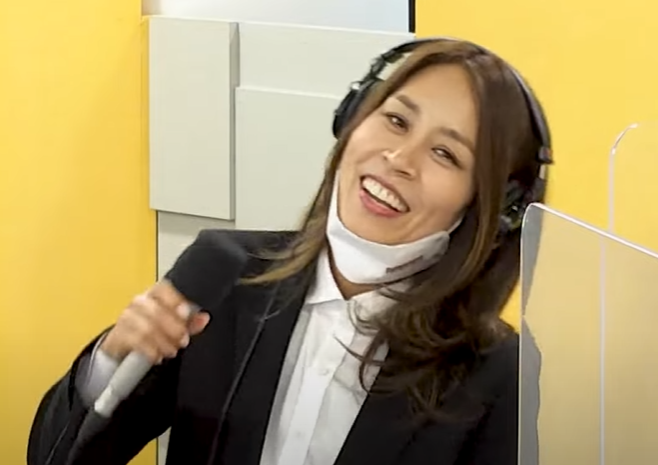
- Choi in April 2021
- Born: August 2, 1969 (age 57); Seoul
- Occupation: Actress
- Years active: 1989–present

Korean name
- Hangul: 최정원
- RR: Choe Jeongwon
- MR: Ch'oe Chŏngwŏn

Choi Jung-won (Korean: 최정원; born August 2, 1969) is a South Korean actress. She is best known in musical theatre, and has starred in Korean productions of Singin' in the Rain, Rent, Chicago, and Kiss Me, Kate.

== Filmography ==
=== Television shows ===
Year	Title	Role	Notes	Ref.
2021	DIMF Musical Star	Judge		

== Theater ==
- Guys and Dolls (1989)-Ensemble
- West Side Story (1994)-Anita
- Grease (1995)-Sandy
- West Side Story (1997)-Anita
- Grease (1998)-Betty Rizzo
- Rent (2000)-Mimi Marquez
- Tick, Tick…Boom! (2001)-Susan
- Rent (2001)-Mimi Marquez
- Chicago (2001)- Roxie Hart
- Cabaret (2002)- Sally Bowles
- The Producers (2006)- Ulla Bloom
- Mamma Mia (2007)- Donna Sheridan
- Chicago (2008)- Velma Kelly
- Mamma Mia (2009)- Donna Sheridan
- Kiss Me, Kate (2010)-Lilli Vanessi
- Chicago (2013)-Velma Kelly
- Ghost (2014)-Oda Mae Brown
- Urinetown (2015)-Penelope Pennywise
- Chicago (2015)-Velma Kelly
- Mamma Mia (2016)- Donna Sheridan
- 42nd Street (2016)-Dorothy Brock
- 42nd Street (2017)-Dorothy Brock
- Billy Elliot (2017)-Mrs. Wilkinson
- Matilda (2018)-Mrs. Wormwood
- Chicago (2018)-Velma Kelly
- 42nd Street (2020)-Dorothy Brock
- Billy Elliot (2021–2022)-Mrs. Wilkinson
- Chicago (2021–2022)-Velma Kelly
- Frida (2022)-Frida
- Next to Normal (2022)- Diana Goodman

== Awards and nominations ==
Year	Award	Category	Nominated work	Result	Ref.
1995	Korea Musical Awards	Female Newcomer Award	Save the Last Dance for Me	Won	
1996	Korea Musical Awards	Best Supporting Actress	Singin' in the Rain	Won	
2001	Korea Musical Awards	Best Leading Actress	Chicago	Won	
2010	Korea Musical Awards	Best Leading Actress	Kiss Me, Kate	Won	
2014	The Musical Awards	Best Supporting Actress	Ghost	Won	
2023	Korea Musical Awards	Best Supporting Actress	Next to Normal	Won	
