= Choi Jung-won (speed skater) =

South Korean speed skater

Medal record

Women's short track speed skating

Representing South Korea

World Championships
| Gold medal – first place | 2010 Sofia | 3000 m relay |
| Bronze medal – third place | 2012 Shanghai | 3000 m relay |

World Team Championships
| Gold medal – first place | 2010 Bormio | Team |

Winter Universiade
| Gold medal – first place | 2009 Harbin | 3000 m |
| Silver medal – second place | 2009 Harbin | 3000 m relay |

World Junior Championships
| Silver medal – second place | 2006 Miercurea-Ciuc | Overall |

Choi Jung-Won (Korean: 최정원; Hanja: 崔貞洹; born March 16, 1990) is a South Korean female short track speed skater.

== See also ==
- South Korea at the 2010 Winter Olympics
