= Lee Jong-won (volleyball) =

South Korean volleyball player (born 1952)

Personal information
- Born: February 13, 1952 (age 74); South Korea

- Lee Jong-won
- Hangul: 이종원
- Hanja: 李琮遠
- RR: I Jongwon
- MR: I Chongwŏn

Lee Jong-won (born 13 February 1952) is a South Korean former volleyball player who competed in the 1976 Summer Olympics.
