= Bianca Walter =

German short track speed skater

Bianca Merker
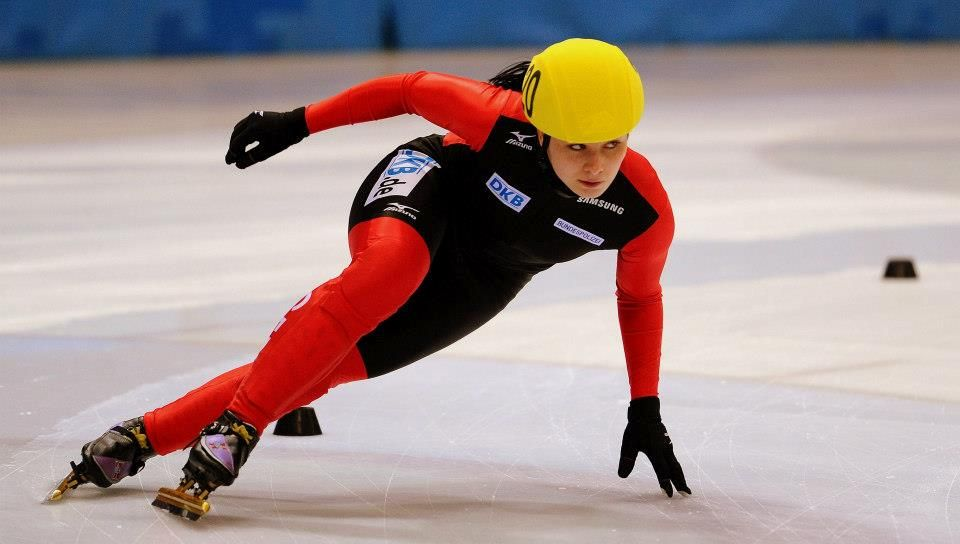
- Walter in 2012

Personal information
- Nationality: German
- Born: Bianca Walter; 31 March 1990 (age 36) Dresden, East Germany

Sport
- Sport: Short track speed skating

Bianca Merker (born Bianca Walter; 31 March 1990) is a German short track speed skater. She competed in the women's 500 metres at the 2018 Winter Olympics.

== Biography ==
Walter was born in 1990 in EV Dresden. She was the daughter of the former speed skater Skadi Walter and she was brought up in an enthusiastic family of skaters. Her mother was a successful skater and her grandmother was a figure skating coach. Walter was on skates at the age of three and by age of nine, she experimented with the short track at the former ESC Dresden.

In 2006 she became a member of the German Ladies Short Track national team when she was 16 and she made her international debut in the 2006/07 World Cup season in Saguenay in Canada, The same year she competed in the Junior World Championships where she was beaten in the heats. Walter won her first silver medal with German team at the European Championships in Turin.
