= Guillaume Bastille =

Canadian short-track speed skater (born 1985)

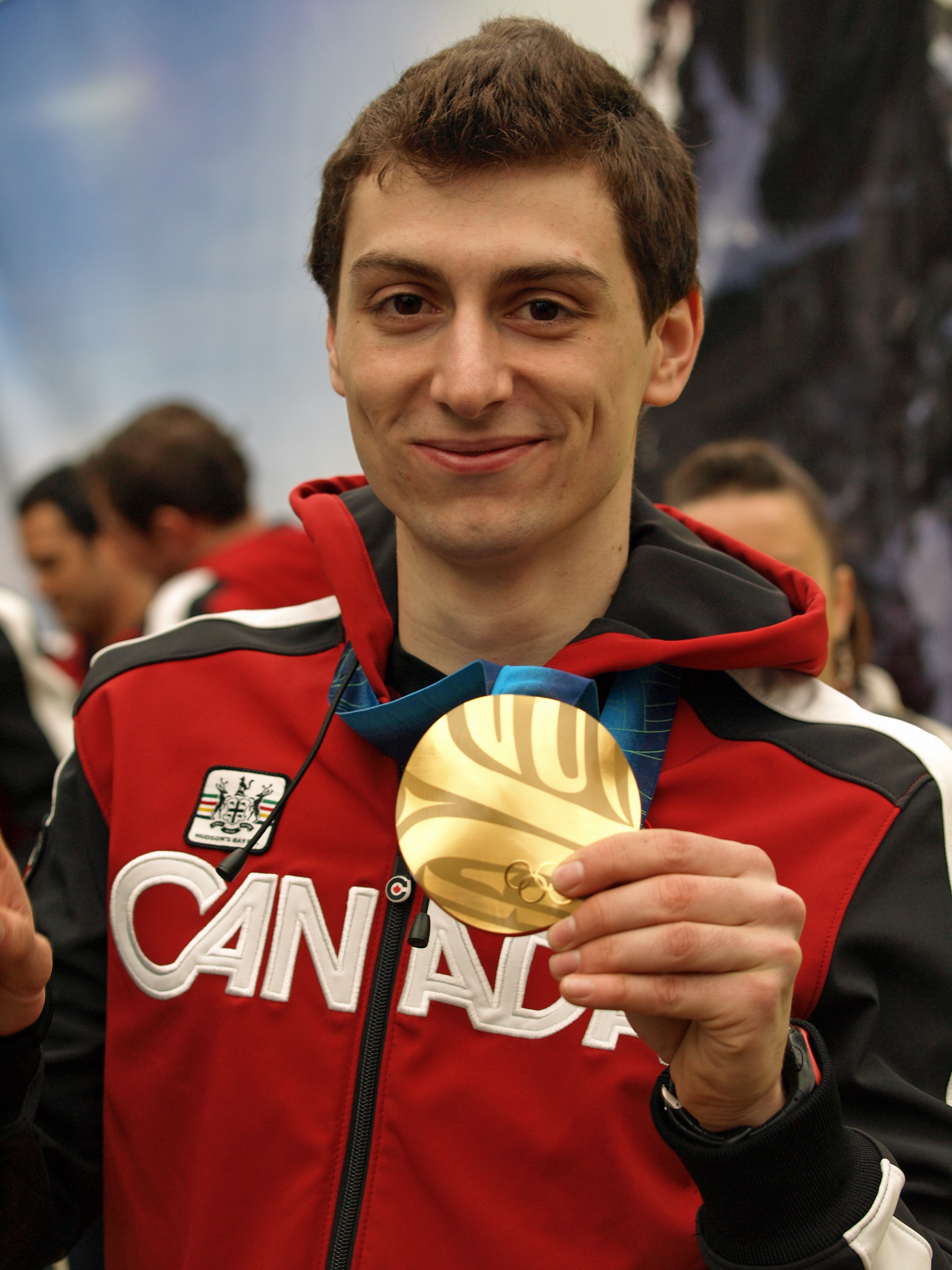

Personal information
- Born: 21 July 1985 (age 40) Rivière-du-Loup, Quebec, Canada
- Height: 176 cm (5 ft 9 in)
- Weight: 70 kg (154 lb)

Sport
- Country: Canada
- Sport: Short track speed skating
- Club: Rivière-du-Loup

Achievements and titles
- Olympic finals: 2010
Medal record
Men's short track speed skating
Representing Canada
Winter Olympics
Gold medal – first place	2010 Vancouver	5,000 m relay
World Championships
Gold medal – first place	2012 Shanghai	5,000 m relay
World Team Championships
Silver medal – second place	2010 Bormio	Team
World Junior Championships
Bronze medal – third place	2005 Belgrade	2000 m relay

Guillaume Bastille (French pronunciation: [ɡijom bastij]; born 21 July 1985) is a Canadian short-track speed skater from Rivière-du-Loup, Quebec who lives in Brossard.

He competed at the 2010 Winter Olympics in Vancouver in the men's 1,500 metre short track and the men's 5,000 metre relay competitions. On 26 February, he won a gold medal in the 5,000 m relay along with Charles Hamelin, François Hamelin, François-Louis Tremblay and Olivier Jean.
