= Elise Christie =

British short-track speed skater

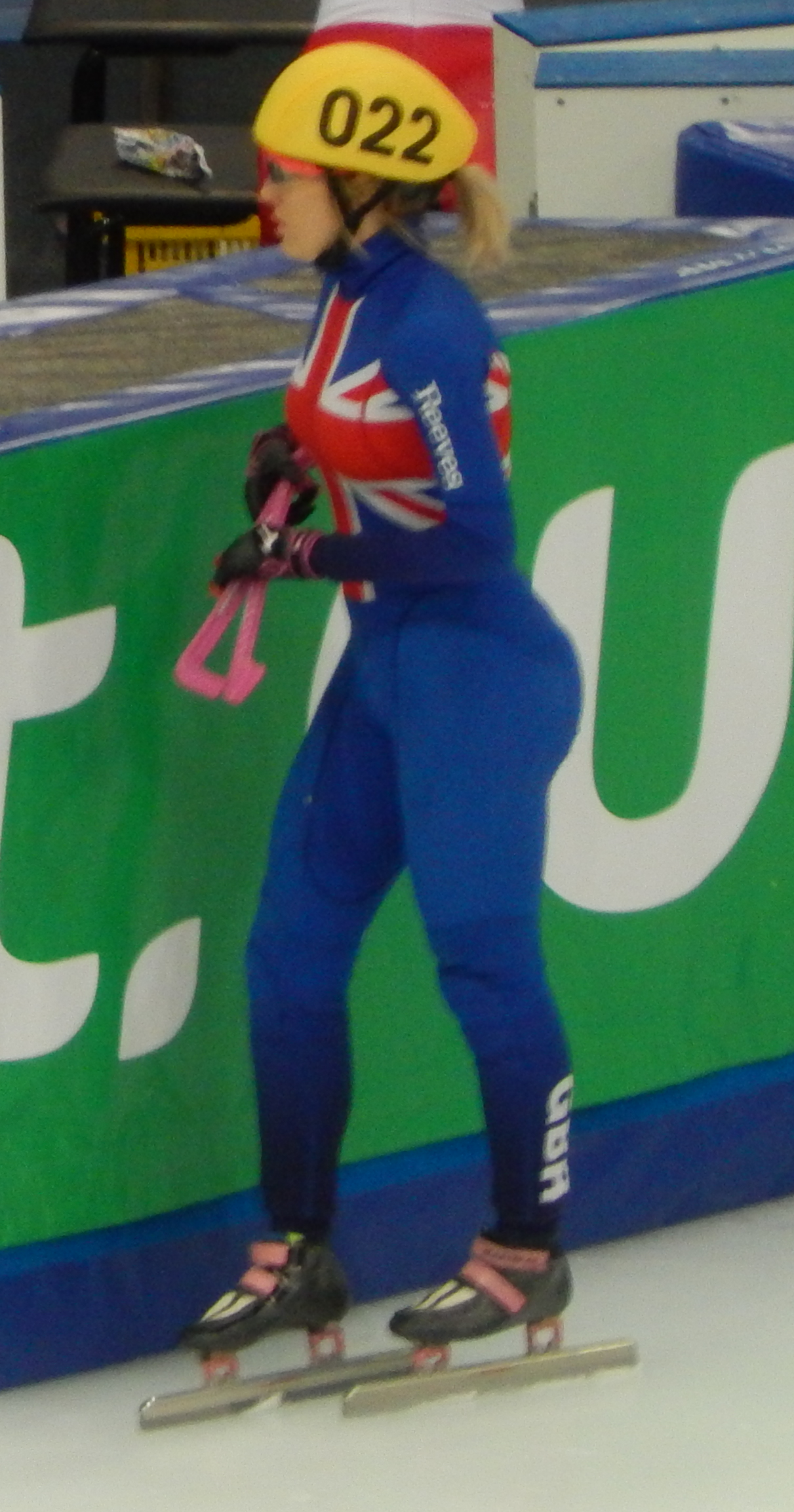

Personal information
- Born: 13 August 1990 (age 36) Livingston, Scotland
- Height: 1.60 m (5 ft 3 in)
- Weight: 54 kg (119 lb)

Sport
- Country: Great Britain
- Sport: Short track speed skating
- Club: Forth Valley

Achievements and titles
- Personal bests: 500 m: 42.335; 1000 m: 1:28.723; 1500 m: 2:18.696; 3000 m: 5:05.419
Medal record
World Championships
| Gold medal – first place | 2017 Rotterdam | Overall |
| Gold medal – first place | 2017 Rotterdam | 1000 m |
| Gold medal – first place | 2017 Rotterdam | 1500 m |
| Silver medal – second place | 2014 Montreal | 500 m |
| Silver medal – second place | 2015 Moscow | 500 m |
| Silver medal – second place | 2015 Moscow | 1000 m |
| Silver medal – second place | 2016 Seoul | 1000 m |
| Bronze medal – third place | 2013 Debrecen | 1000 m |
| Bronze medal – third place | 2016 Seoul | Overall |
| Bronze medal – third place | 2016 Seoul | 1500 m |
| Bronze medal – third place | 2016 Seoul | 3000 m |
| Bronze medal – third place | 2017 Rotterdam | 3000 m |
European Championships
| Gold medal – first place | 2013 Malmo | 1500 m |
| Gold medal – first place | 2013 Malmo | 1000 m |
| Gold medal – first place | 2014 Dresden | 1500 m |
| Gold medal – first place | 2015 Dordrecht | Overall |
| Gold medal – first place | 2015 Dordrecht | 500 m |
| Gold medal – first place | 2015 Dordrecht | 1500 m |
| Gold medal – first place | 2016 Sochi | Overall |
| Gold medal – first place | 2016 Sochi | 1500 m |
| Gold medal – first place | 2016 Sochi | 1000 m |
| Gold medal – first place | 2016 Sochi | 500 m |
| Silver medal – second place | 2010 Dresden | 1500 m |
| Silver medal – second place | 2010 Dresden | 3000 m |
| Silver medal – second place | 2013 Malmo | Overall |
| Silver medal – second place | 2014 Dresden | Overall |
| Silver medal – second place | 2014 Dresden | Relay |
| Silver medal – second place | 2015 Dordrecht | 3000 m |
| Silver medal – second place | 2019 Dordrecht | 1500 m |
| Bronze medal – third place | 2010 Dresden | Overall |

Elise Christie (born 13 August 1990) is a British former short track speed skater. She was coached by Nicky Gooch and she specialised in the 1000m event. She is ten times a European gold medallist, including two overall European titles in 2015 and 2016. In the 2017 World Championships in Rotterdam she won world titles in the 1000m and 1500m events, along with the overall gold, marking her as the first British woman and first European woman to achieve such a feat.

== Early life ==
Christie was born in Livingston, Scotland in 1990. She attended St Margaret's Academy in Livingston for her schooling. Later, she pursued her studies at Loughborough College, participating in the Advanced Level Apprenticeship in Sporting Excellence (AASE) sports programme.

Originally a figure skater, Christie transitioned to speed skating around the age of twelve. At fifteen, she made the decision to fully commit to speed skating, relocating to Nottingham to undergo full-time training at the National Ice Centre. She has given her reason for switching her ice discipline as "I just didn't like the fact figure skating has judging. I prefer the first over the line, wins the race."

== Sporting career ==
=== European Championships ===
At the 2010 European Short Track Speed Skating Championships in Dresden, Germany, Christie won a silver medal in the 1500m and 3000m, and took the overall bronze medal.

At the 2013 European Championships in Malmö, Sweden, Christie won gold in the 1500m and 1000m, and took the overall silver medal behind defending champion Arianna Fontana from Italy.

Christie retained her 1000m title from the previous year at the 2014 European Championships in Dresden. She also won a silver medal as part of the British team in the 3000m relay, and narrowly missed out on a medal in the 1500m where she finished fourth. As a result, she took the overall silver medal behind gold medallist Jorien ter Mors from the Netherlands.

She claimed her first overall European title at the 2015 European Championships in Dordrecht, Netherlands, after winning gold in the 500m and 1500m and finishing second in the 3000m super final.

At the 2016 European Championships in Sochi, Russia, Christie retained her overall European title after winning gold in the 500m, 1000m and 1500m events.

Christie did not participate in the 2017 European Championships because she was concentrating on training for the 2017 World Championships.

=== World Championships ===
At the 2013 World Short Track Speed Skating Championships in Debrecen, Hungary, Christie won a bronze medal in 1000m. In addition Christie was the 1000 metres champion for the 2012–13 World Cup season.

At the 2014 World Short Track Speed Skating Championships in Montreal, Quebec, Canada, Christie won a silver medal in 500m and came 4th overall.

At the 2015 World Short Track Speed Skating Championships in Moscow, Russia, Christie took two silvers in the 500m and 1000m, becoming the first British skater to win two medals at a World Short Track Speed Skating Championships.

At the 2016 World Short Track Speed Skating Championships in Seoul, South Korea, Christie took a total of four medals, winning the bronze in the 1500m before taking a silver in the 1000m and a bronze in the 3000m to take the overall bronze.

At the 2017 World Short Track Speed Skating Championships in Rotterdam, Netherlands, she became the first British woman to win a speed skating world championship when she took the gold medal in the 1500m. She also finished fourth in the 500m before taking a second gold in the 1000m and a bronze in the 3000m to clinch the overall gold, becoming the first non-Asian skater to win the women's overall world title in 23 years.

Earlier that season, on 13 November 2016, Elise Christie set a new world record for the 500m short track speed skating event, clocking 42.335 seconds in the quarter-finals at the second World Cup meeting of the season in Salt Lake City. In recognition of this achievement, Christie was hailed as the "fastest woman on ice" and a special banner celebrating her success was unveiled at the National Ice Centre.

=== Olympic Games ===
==== 2010 Winter Olympics ====
Christie competed in the 2010 Winter Olympics in Vancouver, British Columbia, Canada finishing 11th in the 500m, 19th in the 1000m and 20th in the 1500m.

==== 2014 Winter Olympics ====
At the 2014 Winter Olympics in Sochi, Russia, Christie entered the 500m, 1000m and 1500m events with high hopes of winning a medal. She reached the A final of the 500m, but was disqualified when she collided with Italian skater Arianna Fontana, finishing eighth after being ranked below the B finalists. She was also harassed on Twitter by South Koreans who accused her of causing Park Seung-Hi to crash. This led to calls from the BOA to improve the policing of comments made on athletes' Twitter and Facebook accounts and for Christie to close her Twitter account.

She competed in the 1500m event two days later, where she was disqualified in the heats for not crossing the finishing line, reportedly only 1 cm off the permitted leeway. Christie qualified for the 1000m quarter-finals by comfortably winning her heat, and she won her quarter-final race; but she was then disqualified for the third time, in the semi-final, after colliding with China's Jianrou Li on the final turn of the race.

==== 2018 Winter Olympics ====
At the 2018 Winter Olympics in PyeongChang, South Korea, Christie set the first Olympic record of the games during the qualification round of the 500m event, with a time of 42.872 seconds. This was broken a few minutes later in the same round by Choi Min-jeong by 0.002 seconds. Christie regained the Olympic record in the quarter-finals with a time of 42.703 seconds, only to lose it again to Choi Min-jeong in the semi-finals. Christie finished second in her semi-final before crashing out in the 500 metre final as Yara Van Kerkhof's skate clipped her hand when Van Kerkhof was under-taking her; Christie finished fourth while Van Kerkhof took silver.

In the 1500 metre event, Christie finished first in her heat but crashed out of her semi-final race in a collision with Li Jinyu, for which she was disqualified. Christie was taken to hospital with an injury to her right ankle, putting her participation in the 1000m event in doubt.

In her 1000m heat, Christie fell before the first corner, causing the race to be restarted. On the second attempt, Christie finished second, qualifying for the quarter-finals, but was carried off the track in pain by her coach. However, the judges considered that she had committed an offence by causing two separate collision incidents, which led to her being disqualified from the event.

Christie had stated her intention to return to short track speed skating for the 2022 Winter Olympics in Beijing. She also considered taking up long track speed skating and a possibility to complete in both short and long track in 2022.

=== Retirement ===
On 14 December 2021, Christie announced her retirement from short track speed skating after an ankle injury prevented her from qualifying for the 2022 Winter Olympics in Beijing.

Just over two months after her announcement, during a live TV interview, Christie indicated a potential return to short track speed skating and expressed hopes of competing at the 2026 Winter Olympics in Milan and Cortina d'Ampezzo. She stated that she would have to self-fund her next Olympic bid and is expecting to train outside of the United Kingdom, with an intention to focus on the shorter 500 and 1000 metre distances.

== Personal life ==
Elise Christie was named Nottingham Sportswoman of the Year in 2013 and 2015 (and runner-up in 2014). She was named Sunday Times Sportswoman of the Year in 2017, in recognition of her world title success at the 2017 World Championships.

She was in a relationship with Hungarian short track speed skater Shaolin Sándor Liu from October 2015, before breaking up at the 2018 Winter Olympics.

Christie discussed via a social media post in 2019 highlighting mental health awareness that she had suffered from depression and anxiety for a two-year period, including self-harm.

In September 2021, Christie revealed that she had been raped when she was 19, on a night out in Nottingham in 2010, after having her drink spiked.

== See also ==
- Short track speed skating at the 2018 Winter Olympics
