= Liu Qiuhong =

Chinese speed skater (born 1988)

Personal information
- Born: November 26, 1988 (age 37) Qitaihe, Heilongjiang, China
- Height: 166 cm (5 ft 5 in)
- Weight: 55 kg (121 lb)

Sport
- Country: China
- Sport: Short track speed skating
- Coached by: Li Yan (National Team Coach)

Achievements and titles
- Personal bests: 500m: 43.042 (2008); 1000m: 1:29.339 (2012); 1500m: 2:22.430 (2012); 3000m: 5:12.689 (2009)
Medal record
Women's short track speed skating
Representing China
Event	1st	2nd	3rd
World Championships	5	3	2
World Team Championships	2	1	0
Asian Games	2	0	1
World Championships
Gold medal – first place	2009 Vienna	3000 m relay
Gold medal – first place	2011 Sheffield	3000 m relay
Gold medal – first place	2012 Shanghai	3000 m relay
Gold medal – first place	2013 Debrecen	3000 m relay
Gold medal – first place	2014 Montreal	3000 m relay
Silver medal – second place	2008 Gangneung City	500 m
Silver medal – second place	2009 Vienna	500 m
Silver medal – second place	2012 Shanghai	1500 m
Bronze medal – third place	2008 Gangneung City	3000 m relay
Bronze medal – third place	2011 Sheffield	500 m
Bronze medal – third place	2011 Sheffield	3000 m
World Team Championships
Gold medal – first place	2008 Halbin	Team
Gold medal – first place	2009 Heerenveen	Team
Silver medal – second place	2011 Warsaw	Team
World Junior Championships
Silver medal – second place	2004 Beijing	2000 m relay
Winter Universiade
Gold medal – first place	2007 Turin	3000 m relay
Gold medal – first place	2009 Halbin	500 m
Gold medal – first place	2009 Halbin	1000 m
Gold medal – first place	2009 Halbin	3000 m relay
Silver medal – second place	2009 Halbin	1500 m
Silver medal – second place	2009 Halbin	3000 m
Asian Winter Games
Gold medal – first place	2011 Astana-Almaty	3000 m relay
Gold medal – first place	2011 Astana-Almaty	500 m
Bronze medal – third place	2011 Astana-Almaty	1000 m

Liu Qiuhong (simplified Chinese: 刘秋宏; traditional Chinese: 劉秋宏; pinyin: Liú Qiūhóng; born November 26, 1988, in Mudanjiang, Heilongjiang) is a Chinese female short track speed skater.

Liu made her Olympic debut in Vancouver, skating in all four events: 500m, 1000m, 1500m and 3000m relay. Liu is considered the second-fastest Chinese skater, behind Wang Meng.

In the 2008 ISU world championships, Liu won the silver medal in lady's 500 meter final, and has been a key contributor to China's successful relay efforts. Despite being her least favorite event, Liu's biggest success on the World Cup circuit in the fall of 2009 came in the 1500m, where she was ranked fifth overall and closed out the season with a third-place in Montreal followed by a runner-up finish in Marquette. China's relay team won the last three competitions of the season, and Liu was a member of each of those squads.

Olympic Games
Preceded by Zhao Hongbo	Flagbearer for China at the Olympics closing ceremony Sochi 2014	Succeeded by Wu Dajing
