= Adipose eyelid =

Transparent eyelid found in some species of fish

An adipose eyelid is a transparent eyelid found in some species of fish, that covers some or all of the eye. They are most commonly found on deep sea (benthic) fish, but can also be seen on non-benthic fish. Fish with this feature include milkfish, isospondyls (including herring), jacks, mullets, and mackerel. The overall anatomy of the eyelids plays an important role in understanding their possible purpose.

== Purpose ==
Though the true purpose of these bodily structures is not known, it is generally accepted that the eyelids play some role in affecting the vision of the fish or otherwise serving to protect the fish. There are four proposed theories.

- The eyelid may act as a lens, increasing the fish's ability to focus on specific objects and interpreting its surroundings better.
- It may provide the fish the capability of seeing polarized light.
- It may block out ultraviolet light.
- It may serve as a physical barrier against foreign objects in the waters.

Scientists are still unsure of the biological implications for the second theory. The first theory is more practical because of the presence of this feature on deep sea fish. This ability to see better is crucial for their survival as visibility is severely reduced in the deeper parts of the ocean. The opposite however can be said for the non-benthic fish because there is more light near the surface of the ocean, so there would not necessarily be a need for a stronger sense of sight.

== Anatomy ==
Most adipose eyelids are separated into anterior and posterior parts, commonly referred to as layers. These layers also vary in number, anywhere from three to five, depending on the fish. The layers are arranged in a parallel fashion, relative to the dorsal fin to the fish's belly. This arrangement makes for eyelids that are optically positive, meaning that a certain amount and type of light will be able to enter the eye. The eyelids also are able to filter out certain wavelengths of light and have different refractive indices for light. The skin of the eyelid is the thinnest over the eyeballs and begins to thicken as it moves on to the cheek and face of the fish.

Epithelial tissue and connective tissue formed from several fibers of collagen are the main components of these layers. In some fish, there are three layers, with the middle layer being made of connective tissue, which helps to bind the other two epithelial layers together.

=== Filter specifics ===
One special detail about adipose eyelids is their ability to filter out specific wavelengths of light. For example, different fish have a different concentration of epithelial tissue in their eyelids. However, there is a range that most of the eyelids will filter. Most adipose eyelids can filter out light that has a wavelength shorter than 305 nanometers. Another fact is that these eyelids can also reflect light and this level of reflection corresponds to polarization of the light and the angle at which it is shone. To test for these ranges, different fish eyelids were exposed to light generated from photometers and polarizing microscopes.
