= Short-track speed skating at the 2002 Winter Olympics – Women's 1500 metres =

Women's 1500 metres at the XIX Olympic Winter Games
- Pictogram for short track
- Venue: Salt Lake Ice Center
- Dates: 13 February 2002
- Competitors: 28 from 17 nations
- Winning time: 2:31.581

Medalists
1st place, gold medalist(s)		Ko Gi-hyun	South Korea
2nd place, silver medalist(s)		Choi Eun-kyung	South Korea
3rd place, bronze medalist(s)		Evgeniya Radanova	Bulgaria

The Women's 1500 metres in short track speed skating at the 2002 Winter Olympics took place on 13 February at the Salt Lake Ice Center.

== Records ==
Prior to this competition, the existing world and Olympic records were as follows:

World record	Kim Moon-jung (KOR)	2:21.844	Montreal, Canada	17 January 1999
Olympic record	None	None	None	None

The following new Olympic and World records were set during this competition.

Date	Round	Team	Time	OR	WR
13 February	Heat 1	Yang Yang (S) (CHN)	2:26.943	OR	
13 February	Semifinal 2	Choi Eun-kyung (KOR)	2:21.069	OR	WR

== Results ==
=== Heats ===
The first round was held on 13 February. There were five heats, with the top three finishers moving on to the semifinals.

Heat 1

Rank	Athlete	Country	Time	Notes
1	Yang Yang (S)	China	2:26.943	Q OR
2	Alanna Kraus	Canada	2:26.968	Q
3	Amy Peterson	United States	2:27.062	Q
4	Jo Williams	Great Britain	2:27.845	
5	Yvonne Kunze	Germany	2:29.779	
6	Christy Ren	Hong Kong	2:49.666	

Heat 2

Rank	Athlete	Country	Time	Notes
1	Ko Gi-hyun	South Korea	2:26.980	Q
2	Mara Zini	Italy	2:27.553	Q
3	Christin Priebst	Germany	2:27.649	Q
4	Katalin Kristo	Romania	2:28.709	
5	Nataliya Dmitriyeva	Russia	2:29.086	
6	Eva Farkas	Hungary	2:42.172	

Heat 3

Rank	Athlete	Country	Time	Notes
1	Evgeniya Radanova	Bulgaria	2:32.821	Q
2	Nina Yevteyeva	Russia	2:32.970	Q
3	Kateřina Novotná	Czech Republic	2:35.438	Q
4	Yuka Kamino	Japan	2:52.591	
–	Erin Porter	United States	DQ	

Heat 4

Rank	Athlete	Country	Time	Notes
1	Choi Eun-kyung	South Korea	2:29.460	Q
2	Yang Yang (A)	China	2:29.578	Q
3	Marie-Ève Drolet	Canada	2:29.652	Q
4	Marina Georgieva-Nikolova	Bulgaria	2:33.362	
5	Marianna Nagy	Hungary	2:39.615	

Heat 5

Rank	Athlete	Country	Time	Notes
1	Chikage Tanaka	Japan	2:29.202	Q
2	Stéphanie Bouvier	France	2:30.075	Q
3	Olga Danilov	Israel	2:32.458	Q
4	Yuliya Pavlovich-Yelsakova	Belarus	2:36.058	
5	Sarah Lindsay	Great Britain	3:01.223	
6	Katia Zini	Italy	3:19.248	

=== Semifinals ===
The semifinals were held on 13 February. The top two finishers in each of the three semifinals qualified for the A final, while the third and fourth place skaters advanced to the B Final.

Semifinal 1

Rank	Athlete	Country	Time	Notes
1	Ko Gi-hyun	South Korea	2:31.120	QA
2	Evgeniya Radanova	Bulgaria	2:31.194	QA
3	Stéphanie Bouvier	France	2:31.570	QB
4	Christin Priebst	Germany	2:32.884	QB
5	Kateřina Novotná	Czech Republic	2:35.085	

Semifinal 2

Rank	Athlete	Country	Time	Notes
1	Choi Eun-kyung	South Korea	2:21.069	QA WR
2	Yang Yang (A)	China	2:21.690	QA
3	Marie-Ève Drolet	Canada	2:21.758	QB
4	Chikage Tanaka	Japan	2:21.924	QB
5	Amy Peterson	United States	2:26.118	

Semifinal 3

Rank	Athlete	Country	Time	Notes
1	Yang Yang (S)	China	2:32.315	QA
2	Alanna Kraus	Canada	2:32.411	QA
3	Nina Yevteyeva	Russia	2:32.759	QB
4	Mara Zini	Italy	2:32.899	QB
5	Olga Danilov	Israel	2:36.114	

=== Finals ===
The six qualifying skaters competed in Final A, while six others raced in Final B.

Final A

Rank	Athlete	Country	Time	Notes
1st place, gold medalist(s)	Ko Gi-hyun	South Korea	2:31.581	
2nd place, silver medalist(s)	Choi Eun-kyung	South Korea	2:31.610	
3rd place, bronze medalist(s)	Evgeniya Radanova	Bulgaria	2:31.723	
4	Yang Yang (A)	China	2:31.791	
5	Alanna Kraus	Canada	3:05.002	
–	Yang Yang (S)	China	DQ	

Final B

Rank	Athlete	Country	Time	Notes
6	Marie-Ève Drolet	Canada	2:31.203	
7	Chikage Tanaka	Japan	2:31.479	
8	Christin Priebst	Germany	2:32.442	
9	Mara Zini	Italy	2:32.513	
10	Nina Yevteyeva	Russia	2:32.666	
11	Stéphanie Bouvier	France	2:32.673	
