= Short-track speed skating at the 2002 Winter Olympics – Women's 1000 metres =

Women's 1000 metres at the XIX Olympic Winter Games
- Pictogram for short track
- Venue: Salt Lake Ice Center
- Dates: 20–23 February 2002
- Competitors: 28 from 16 nations
- Winning time: 1:36.391

Medalists
1st place, gold medalist(s)		Yang Yang (A)	China
2nd place, silver medalist(s)		Ko Gi-hyun	South Korea
3rd place, bronze medalist(s)		Yang Yang (S)	China

The women's 1000 metres in short track speed skating at the 2002 Winter Olympics took place from 20 to 23 February at the Salt Lake Ice Center.

== Records ==
Prior to this competition, the existing world and Olympic records were as follows:

World record	Yang Yang (A) (CHN)	1:31.191	Calgary, Canada	3 February 2002
Olympic record	Yang Yang (A) (CHN)	1:31.991	Nagano, Japan	21 February 1998

The following new Olympic records were set during this competition.

Date	Round	Team	Time	OR	WR
23 February	Quarterfinal 1	Yang Yang (A) (CHN)	1:31.235	OR	

== Results ==
=== Heats ===
The first round was held on 20 February. There were eight heats, with the top two finishers moving on to the quarterfinals.

Heat 1

Rank	Athlete	Country	Time	Notes
1	Yang Yang (S)	China	1:40.632	Q
2	Marie-Ève Drolet	Canada	1:40.646	Q
3	Christy Ren	Hong Kong	1:50.094	

Heat 2

Rank	Athlete	Country	Time	Notes
1	Evgeniya Radanova	Bulgaria	1:49.496	Q
2	Christin Priebst	Germany	1:49.569	Q
3	Nataliya Dmitriyeva	Russia	1:50.132	

Heat 3

Rank	Athlete	Country	Time	Notes
1	Jo Williams	Great Britain	1:39.672	Q
2	Nina Yevteyeva	Russia	1:46.673	Q
3	Cordia Tsoi	Hong Kong	1:48.445	
4	Erin Porter	United States	1:56.409	

Heat 4

Rank	Athlete	Country	Time	Notes
1	Choi Eun-kyung	South Korea	1:37.609	Q
2	Caroline Hallisey	United States	1:37.716	Q
3	Anna Krasteva	Bulgaria	1:39.195	
–	Katia Zini	Italy	DQ	

Heat 5

Rank	Athlete	Country	Time	Notes
1	Yang Yang (A)	China	1:37.039	Q
2	Stéphanie Bouvier	France	1:37.684	Q
3	Szandra Lajtos	Hungary	1:40.688	

Heat 6

Rank	Athlete	Country	Time	Notes
1	Ko Gi-hyun	South Korea	1:42.093	Q
2	Sarah Lindsay	Great Britain	1:42.157	Q
3	Katalin Kristo	Romania	1:42.276	
4	Kateřina Novotná	Czech Republic	1:42.495	

Heat 7

Rank	Athlete	Country	Time	Notes
1	Alanna Kraus	Canada	1:33.622	Q
2	Mara Zini	Italy	1:33.697	Q
3	Ikue Teshigawara	Japan	1:33.855	
4	Marianna Nagy	Hungary	1:39.648	

Heat 8

Rank	Athlete	Country	Time	Notes
1	Chikage Tanaka	Japan	1:42.332	Q
2	Yvonne Kunze	Germany	1:42.389	Q
3	Olga Danilov	Israel	1:42.767	

=== Quarterfinals ===
The quarterfinals were held on 23 February. The top two finishers in each of the four quarterfinals advanced to the semifinals.

Quarterfinal 1

Rank	Athlete	Country	Time	Notes
1	Yang Yang (A)	China	1:31.235	Q OR
2	Ko Gi-hyun	South Korea	1:31.349	Q
3	Caroline Hallisey	United States	1:33.007	
4	Nina Yevteyeva	Russia	1:36.519	

Quarterfinal 2

Rank	Athlete	Country	Time	Notes
1	Alanna Kraus	Canada	1:36.683	Q
2	Evgeniya Radanova	Bulgaria	1:36.727	Q
3	Sarah Lindsay	Great Britain	1:36.753	
4	Christin Priebst	Germany	1:36.848	

Quarterfinal 3

Rank	Athlete	Country	Time	Notes
1	Choi Eun-kyung	South Korea	1:34.842	Q
2	Chikage Tanaka	Japan	1:34.960	Q
3	Stéphanie Bouvier	France	1:35.409	
4	Yvonne Kunze	Germany	1:35.830	

Quarterfinal 4

Rank	Athlete	Country	Time	Notes
1	Yang Yang (S)	China	1:33.561	Q
2	Marie-Ève Drolet	Canada	1:33.578	Q
3	Mara Zini	Italy	1:33.880	
4	Jo Williams	Great Britain	1:34.373	

=== Semifinals ===
The semifinals were held on 23 February. The top two finishers in each of the two semifinals qualified for the A final, while the third and fourth place skaters advanced to the B Final.

Semifinal 1

Rank	Athlete	Country	Time	Notes
1	Marie-Ève Drolet	Canada	1:37.916	QA
2	Yang Yang (A)	China	1:38.037	QA
3	Chikage Tanaka	Japan	1:38.269	QB
4	Choi Eun-kyung	South Korea	1:38.523	QB

Semifinal 2

Rank	Athlete	Country	Time	Notes
1	Yang Yang (S)	China	1:35.072	QA
2	Ko Gi-hyun	South Korea	1:35.172	QA
3	Alanna Kraus	Canada	1:35.510	QB
4	Evgeniya Radanova	Bulgaria	1:35.607	QB

=== Finals ===
The five qualifying skaters competed in Final A, while two other raced for 6th place in Final B.

Final A

Rank	Athlete	Country	Time	Notes
1st place, gold medalist(s)	Yang Yang (A)	China	1:36.391	
2nd place, silver medalist(s)	Ko Gi-hyun	South Korea	1:36.427	
3rd place, bronze medalist(s)	Yang Yang (S)	China	1:37.008	
4	Marie-Ève Drolet	Canada	1:37.563	

Final B

Rank	Athlete	Country	Time	Notes
5	Evgeniya Radanova	Bulgaria	1:34.702	
6	Choi Eun-kyung	South Korea	1:34.808	
7	Chikage Tanaka	Japan	1:35.125	
8	Alanna Kraus	Canada	1:35.642	
