= Short-track speed skating at the 2006 Winter Olympics – Women's 1000 metres =

Women's 1000 metres at the XX Olympic Winter Games
- Pictogram for short track
- Venue: Torino Palavela
- Dates: 22–25 February 2006
- Competitors: 29 from 20 nations

Medalists
1st place, gold medalist(s)		Jin Sun-yu	South Korea
2nd place, silver medalist(s)		Wang Meng	China
3rd place, bronze medalist(s)		Yang Yang (A)	China

The women's 1000 metres in short track speed skating at the 2006 Winter Olympics began on 22 February, with the final on 25 February, at the Torino Palavela.

== Records ==
Prior to this competition, the existing world and Olympic records were as follows:

World record	Jin Sun-yu (KOR)	1:30.037	Bormio, Italy	13 November 2005
Olympic record	Yang Yang (A) (CHN)	1:31.235	Salt Lake City, United States	23 February 2002

No new world and Olympic records were set during this competition.

== Results ==
=== Heats ===
The first round was held on 12 February. There were eight heats of three or four skaters each, with the top two finishers moving on to the quarterfinals. One skater, Yvonne Kunze, was advanced after being interfered with.

Heat 1

Heats	Rank	Athlete	Country	Result	Notes
1	1	Tania Vicent	Canada	1:33.904	Q
1	2	Mika Ozawa	Japan	1:33.977	Q
1	3	Ri Hyang-mi	North Korea	1:34.360	
1	4	Katalin Kristo	Romania	1:34.506	
2	1	Yang Yang (A)	China	1:34.878	Q
2	2	Tatiana Borodulina	Russia	1:34.988	Q
2	3	Sarah Lindsay	Great Britain	1:35.539	
3	1	Hyo-jung Kim	United States	1:36.182	Q
3	2	Erika Huszar	Hungary	1:36.515	Q
3	3	Julia Elsakova	Belarus	1:36.885	
3	–	Aika Klein	Germany	DQ	
4	1	Evgenia Radanova	Bulgaria	1:35.765	Q
4	2	Choi Min-kyung	France	1:36.745	Q
4	3	Han Yueshuang	Hong Kong	1:37.883	
5	1	Jin Sun-yu	South Korea	1:31.504	Q
5	2	Arianna Fontana	Italy	1:32.033	Q
5	3	Kateřina Novotná	Czech Republic	1:32.220	
5	4	Stéphanie Bouvier	France	1:33.197	
6	1	Choi Eun-kyung	South Korea	1:38.414	Q
6	2	Emily Rosemond	Australia	1:39.942	Q
6	3	Yvonne Kunze	Germany	1:40.166	
6	–	Marta Capurso	Italy	DQ	
7	1	Wang Meng	China	1:37.161	Q
7	2	Liesbeth Mau Asam	Netherlands	1:38.039	Q
7	3	Evita Krievāne	Latvia	1:38.039	
8	1	Amanda Overland	Canada	1:33.761	Q
8	2	Kimberly Derrick	United States	1:33.812	Q
8	3	Yuka Kamino	Japan	1:33.959	
8	4	Rozsa Darazs	Hungary	1:34.059	

=== Quarterfinals ===
The top two finishers in each of the four quarterfinals advanced to the semifinals. Two skaters, Yang Yang (A) and Tania Vicent, were advanced after other racers were disqualified. One of the disqualified skaters was the 2005 world champion in the 1000 metres, Evgenia Radanova.

Quarterfinal 1

Rank	Athlete	Result	Notes
1	Jin Sun-yu (KOR)	1:33.351	Q
2	Wang Meng (CHN)	1:33.453	Q
3	Emily Rosemond (AUS)	1:37.627	
–	Tatiana Borodulina (RUS)	DQ	

Quarterfinal 2

Rank	Athlete	Result	Notes
1	Choi Eun-Kyung (KOR)	1:32.875	Q
2	Amanda Overland (CAN)	1:33.012	Q
3	Liesbeth Mau Asam (NED)	1:34.034	
–	Kimberly Derrick (USA)	DQ	

Quarterfinal 3

Rank	Athlete	Result	Notes
1	Arianna Fontana (ITA)	1:33.401	Q
2	Yvonne Kunze (GER)	1:33.627	Q
3	Erika Huszar (HUN)	1:34.080	
4	Yang Yang (A) (CHN)	1:59.338	ADV
–	Evgenia Radanova (BUL)	DQ	

Quarterfinal 4

Rank	Athlete	Result	Notes
1	Hyo-Jung Kim (USA)	1:34.164	Q
2	Mika Ozawa (JPN)	1:34.715	Q
3	Tania Vicent (CAN)	1:35.594	ADV
–	Choi Min-Kyung (FRA)	DQ	

=== Semifinals ===
The top two finishers in each of the two semifinals qualified for the A final, while the third and fourth place skaters advanced to the B Final. Since two skaters were advanced from the quarters, each semifinal featured five skaters.

Semifinal 1

Rank	Athlete	Result	Notes
1	Wang Meng (CHN)	1:31.783	QA
2	Choi Eun-kyung (KOR)	1:32.099	QA
3	Tania Vicent (CAN)	1:32.650	QB
4	Yvonne Kunze (GER)	1:36.765	QB
5	Hyo-Jung Kim (USA)	1:54.187	

Semifinal 2

Rank	Athlete	Result	Notes
1	Jin Sun-yu (KOR)	1:32.546	QA
2	Yang Yang (A) (CHN)	1:33.080	QA
3	Amanda Overland (CAN)	1:33.102	QB
4	Arianna Fontana (ITA)	1:33.228	QB
5	Mika Ozawa (JPN)	1:33.337	

=== Finals ===
Choi Eun-kyung was disqualified in the A final, moving Yang Yang (A) up to bronze medal position and the winner of the B final, Tania Vicent, up to 4th.

Final A

Rank	Athlete	Result	Notes
1st place, gold medalist(s)	Jin Sun-yu (KOR)	1:32.859	
2nd place, silver medalist(s)	Wang Meng (CHN)	1:33.079	
3rd place, bronze medalist(s)	Yang Yang (A) (CHN)	1:33.937	
–	Choi Eun-kyung (KOR)	DQ	

Final B

Rank	Athlete	Result	Notes
4	Tania Vicent (CAN)	1:34.099	
5	Amanda Overland (CAN)	1:34.191	
6	Arianna Fontana (ITA)	1:34.269	
7	Yvonne Kunze (GER)	1:34.789	
