= 2001 European Short Track Speed Skating Championships =

- Venue: The Hague, Netherlands
- Dates: 19-21 January

The 2001 European Short Track Speed Skating Championships took place between 19 and 21 January 2000 in The Hague, Netherlands.

== Medal summary ==
=== Medal table ===
* Host nation (Netherlands)

Rank	Nation	Gold	Silver	Bronze	Total
1	Bulgaria (BUL)	6	0	0	6
2	France (FRA)	3	0	3	6
3	Italy (ITA)	2	5	4	11
4	Netherlands (NED)*	1	4	1	6
5	Great Britain (GBR)	0	3	1	4
6	Germany (GER)	0	0	1	1
6	Hungary (HUN)	0	0	1	1
6	Russia (RUS)	0	0	1	1
Totals (8 entries)		12	12	12	36

=== Men's events ===
Event	Gold		Silver		Bronze	
500 metres	Maurizio Carnino (ITA)	43.170	Nicola Rodigari (ITA)	43.200	Dave Versteeg (NED)	43.440
1000 metres	Bruno Loscos (FRA)	1:30.842	Cees Juffermans (NED)	1:31.226	Arian Nachbar (GER)	1:31.322
1500 metres	Bruno Loscos (FRA)	2:19.296	Nicky Gooch (GBR)	2:19.597	Michele Antonioli (ITA)	2:19.723
3000 metres	Cees Juffermans (NED)	5:07.689	Nicky Gooch (GBR)	5:07.874	Nicola Rodigari (ITA)	5:07.988
5000 metre relay	Italy; Nicola Franceschina; Michele Antonioli; Nicola Rodigari; Maurizio Carnino	7:15.968	Great Britain; Nicky Gooch; Leon Flack; Matthew Jasper; Dave Allardice	7:18.248	Hungary; Kornél Szántó; Balázs Knoch; Balázs Kover; Krisztián Szabó	7:23.216
Overall Classification	Bruno Loscos (FRA)	76 pts.	Cees Juffermans (NED)	63 pts.	Nicky Gooch (GBR)	42 pts.

=== Women's events ===
Event	Gold		Silver		Bronze	
500 metres	Evgenia Radanova (BUL)	45.360	Mara Zini (ITA)	45.852	Stéphanie Bouvier (FRA)	46.372
1000 metres	Evgenia Radanova (BUL)	1:36.665	Marta Capurso (ITA)	1:37.116	Mara Zini (ITA)	1:37.478
1500 metres	Evgenia Radanova (BUL)	2:35.542	Mara Zini (ITA)	2:35.968	Marta Capurso (ITA)	2:36.377
3000 metres	Evgenia Radanova (BUL)	5:51.694	Danielle Molendijk (NED)	5:52.535	Stéphanie Bouvier (FRA)	5:54.002
3000 metre relay	Bulgaria; Evgenia Radanova; Marina Georgieva-Nikolova; Anna Stoilkova; Daniela Vlaeva	4:28.970	Netherlands; Anke Jannie Landman; Danielle Molendijk; Melanie de Lange; Anouk Wiegers	4:29.428	Russia; Tatiana Borodulina; Nina Evteeva; Nataliya Dmitriyeva; Yulia Tchatchina	4:30.666
Overall Classification	Evgenia Radanova (BUL)	136 pts.	Mara Zini (ITA)	58 pts.	Stéphanie Bouvier (FRA)	39 pts.

== Participating nations ==
- Austria
- Belgium
- Belarus
- Bulgaria
- Czech Republic
- Estonia
- France
- Germany
- Great Britain
- Hungary
- Israel
- Italy
- Lithuania
- Netherlands
- Norway
- Poland
- Romania
- Russia
- Serbia and Montenegro
- Slovakia
- Slovenia
- Sweden
- Switzerland
- Ukraine

== See also ==
- Short track speed skating
- European Short Track Speed Skating Championships
