= 2000 European Short Track Speed Skating Championships =

- Venue: Bormio, Italy
- Dates: 21-23 January

The 2000 European Short Track Speed Skating Championships took place between 21 and 23 January 2000 in Bormio, Italy.

== Medal summary ==
=== Medal table ===
* Host nation (Italy)

Rank	Nation	Gold	Silver	Bronze	Total
1	Italy (ITA)*	6	7	6	19
2	Bulgaria (BUL)	5	1	0	6
3	Great Britain (GBR)	1	3	2	6
4	Netherlands (NED)	0	1	1	2
5	France (FRA)	0	0	1	1
5	Germany (GER)	0	0	1	1
5	Hungary (HUN)	0	0	1	1
Totals (7 entries)		12	12	12	36

=== Men's events ===
Event	Gold		Silver		Bronze	
500 metres	Fabio Carta (ITA)	42.830	Dave Versteeg (NED)	42.399	Kornél Szántó (HUN)	42.489
1000 metres	Nicola Franceschina (ITA)	1:31.637	Michele Antonioli (ITA)	1:32.180	Cees Juffermans (NED)	1:32.794
1500 metres	Nicky Gooch (GBR)	2:33.339	Nicola Franceschina (ITA)	2:33.366	Michele Antonioli (ITA)	2:33.526
3000 metres	Fabio Carta (ITA)	4:50.374	Nicky Gooch (GBR)	4:51.829	Michele Antonioli (ITA)	4:52.635
5000 metre relay	Italy; Nicola Franceschina; Michele Antonioli; Nicola Rodigari; Maurizio Carnino; Fabio Carta	7:00.928	Great Britain; Nicky Gooch; Leon Flack; Matthew Jasper; Robert Mitchell	7:03.919	France; David Chevalier; Gregory Durand; Ludovic Mathieu; Bruno Loscos	7:06.810
Overall Classification	Fabio Carta (ITA)	73 pts.	Nicky Gooch (GBR)	63 pts.	Nicola Franceschina (ITA)	60 pts.

=== Women's events ===
Event	Gold		Silver		Bronze	
500 metres	Katia Zini (ITA)	44.551	Evgenia Radanova (BUL)	44.563	Debbie Palmer (GBR)	45.709
1000 metres	Evgenia Radanova (BUL)	1:39.261	Evelina Rodigari (ITA)	1:40.007	Yvonne Kunze (GER)	1:40.138
1500 metres	Evgenia Radanova (BUL)	2:30.183	Katia Zini (ITA)	2:30.467	Evelina Rodigari (ITA)	2:31.385
3000 metres	Evgenia Radanova (BUL)	5:57.828	Katia Zini (ITA)	5:58.197	Evelina Rodigari (ITA)	5:59.536
3000 metre relay	Bulgaria; Evgenia Radanova; Marina Georgieva-Nikolova; Anna Stoilkova; Daniela Vlaeva	4:22.540	Italy; Katia Zini; Evelina Rodigari; Mara Zini; Emanuela Giacomelli; Barbara Baldissera	4:23.989	Great Britain; Debbie Palmer; Sarah Lindsay; Joanna Williams; Laura Howell	4:31.872
Overall Classification	Evgenia Radanova (BUL)	123 pts.	Katia Zini (ITA)	76 pts.	Evelina Rodigari (ITA)	47 pts.

== Participating nations ==
- Austria (4/4)
- Belgium (4/0)
- Belarus (0/2)
- Bulgaria (4/4)
- Czech Republic (1/2)
- Estonia (0/1)
- France (4/1)
- Germany (4/2)
- Great Britain (4/4)
- Hungary (4/1)
- Israel (1/1)
- Italy (5/5)
- Lithuania (2/0)
- Netherlands (4/4)
- Norway (1/0)
- Poland (1/0)
- Romania (1/2)
- Russia (4/4)
- Slovakia (4/0)
- Sweden (1/1)
- Switzerland (1/0)
- Ukraine (2/4)

== See also ==
- Short track speed skating
- European Short Track Speed Skating Championships
