= Short-track speed skating at the 2006 Winter Olympics – Women's 1500 metres =

Women's 1500 metres at the XX Olympic Winter Games
- Pictogram for short track
- Venue: Torino Palavela
- Dates: 18 February 2006
- Competitors: 30 from 19 nations

Medalists
1st place, gold medalist(s)		Jin Sun-yu	South Korea
2nd place, silver medalist(s)		Choi Eun-kyung	South Korea
3rd place, bronze medalist(s)		Wang Meng	China

The women's 1500 metres in short track speed skating at the 2006 Winter Olympics took place on 18 February at the Torino Palavela.

== Records ==
Prior to this competition, the existing world and Olympic records were as follows:

World record	Jung Eun-ju (KOR)	2:18.861	Beijing, China	11 January 2004
Olympic record	Choi Eun-kyung (KOR)	2:21.069	Salt Lake City, United States	13 February 2002

No new world and Olympic records were set during this competition.

== Results ==
=== Heats ===
There were six heats of four or five skaters each, with the top three finishers advancing to the semifinals.

Heat	Rank	Athlete	Country	Result	Notes
1	1	Wang Meng	China	2:41.384	Q
1	2	Byun Chun-sa	South Korea	2:41.411	Q
1	3	Katia Zini	Italy	2:41.561	Q
1	4	Rozsa Darazs	Hungary	2:42.256	
1	5	Aika Klein	Germany	2:41.380	
2	1	Allison Baver	United States	2:41.384	Q
2	2	Amanda Overland	Canada	2:27.666	Q
2	3	Liesbeth Mau Asam	Netherlands	2:28.910	Q
2	4	Ikue Teshigawara	Japan	2:30.977	
2	5	Julia Elsakova	Belarus	2:33.564	
3	1	Yang Yang (A)	China	2:37.754	Q
3	2	Choi Eun-kyung	South Korea	2:37.862	Q
3	3	Yuka Kamino	Japan	2:37.865	Q
3	4	Myrtille Gollin	France	2:38.442	
3	5	Emily Rosemond	Australia	2:40.171	
4	1	Evgenia Radanova	Bulgaria	2:27.155	Q
4	2	Hyo-jung Kim	United States	2:27.460	Q
4	3	Tatiana Borodulina	Russia	2:27.757	Q
4	4	Anouk Leblanc-Boucher	Canada	2:28.001	
4	5	Han Yueshuang	Hong Kong	2:36.233	
5	1	Jin Sun-yu	South Korea	2:29.731	Q
5	2	Marta Capurso	Italy	2:31.053	Q
5	3	Kateřina Novotná	Czech Republic	2:31.367	Q
5	4	Katalin Kristo	Romania	2:31.705	
5	5	Evita Krievāne	Latvia	2:36.233	
6	1	Stéphanie Bouvier	France	2:35.410	Q
6	2	Erika Huszar	Hungary	2:35.920	Q
6	3	Sarah Lindsay	Great Britain	2:38.460	Q
6	4	Yvonne Kunze	Germany	2:48.009	
6	5	Cheng Xiaolei	China	2:50.017	

=== Semifinals ===
The top two finishers in each of the three semifinals qualified for the A final, while the third and fourth place skaters advanced to the B Final. Tatiana Borodulina finished fifth in her semifinal, but was advanced due to interference from Stéphanie Bouvier.

Semifinal 1

Rank	Athlete	Result	Notes
1	Jin Sun-yu (KOR)	2:31.747	QA
2	Erika Huszar (HUN)	2:32.504	QA
3	Hyo-jung Kim (USA)	2:32.527	QB
4	Yuka Kamino (JPN)	2:44.05 7	QB
5	Tatiana Borodulina (RUS)	2:45.897	ADV
–	Stéphanie Bouvier (FRA)	DQ	

Semifinal 2

Rank	Athlete	Result	Notes
1	Choi Eun-kyung (KOR)	2:22.776	QA
2	Amanda Overland (CAN)	2:22.946	QA
3	Yang Yang (A) (CHN)	2:23.048	QB
4	Katia Zini (ITA)	2:23.141	QB
5	Allison Baver (USA)	2:23.490	
6	Liesbeth Mau Asam (NED)	2:26.370	

Semifinal 3

Rank	Athlete	Result	Notes
1	Byun Chun-sa (KOR)	2:26.915	QA
2	Wang Meng (CHN)	2:27.095	QA
3	Evgenia Radanova (BUL)	2:27.145	QB
4	Marta Capurso (ITA)	2:27.291	QB
5	Kateřina Novotná (CZE)	2:27.395	
6	Sarah Lindsay (GBR)	2:29.173	

=== Finals ===
The largest short-track race of the Games, with seven women entered, saw two of the skaters disqualified. The most notable of these was Byun Chun-sa, who originally finished third. She was adjudged to have interfered with Wang Meng. Wang, who was originally fourth, moved into the bronze medal position after Byun's disqualification.

Final A

Rank	Athlete	Result	Notes
1st place, gold medalist(s)	Jin Sun-yu (KOR)	2:23.494	
2nd place, silver medalist(s)	Choi Eun-kyung (KOR)	2:24.069	
3rd place, bronze medalist(s)	Wang Meng (CHN)	2:24.469	
4	Erika Huszar (HUN)	2:25.405	
5	Amanda Overland (CAN)	2:26.495	
–	Byun Chun-sa (KOR)	DQ	
–	Tatiana Borodulina (RUS)	DQ	

Final B

Rank	Athlete	Result	Notes
6	Evgenia Radanova (BUL)	2:29.314	
7	Yuka Kamino (JPN)	2:29.540	
8	Hyo-jung Kim (USA)	2:29.978	
9	Marta Capurso (ITA)	2:30.054	
10	Katia Zini (ITA)	2:30.164	
11	Yang Yang (A) (CHN)	2:32.097	
