= 2005 European Short Track Speed Skating Championships =

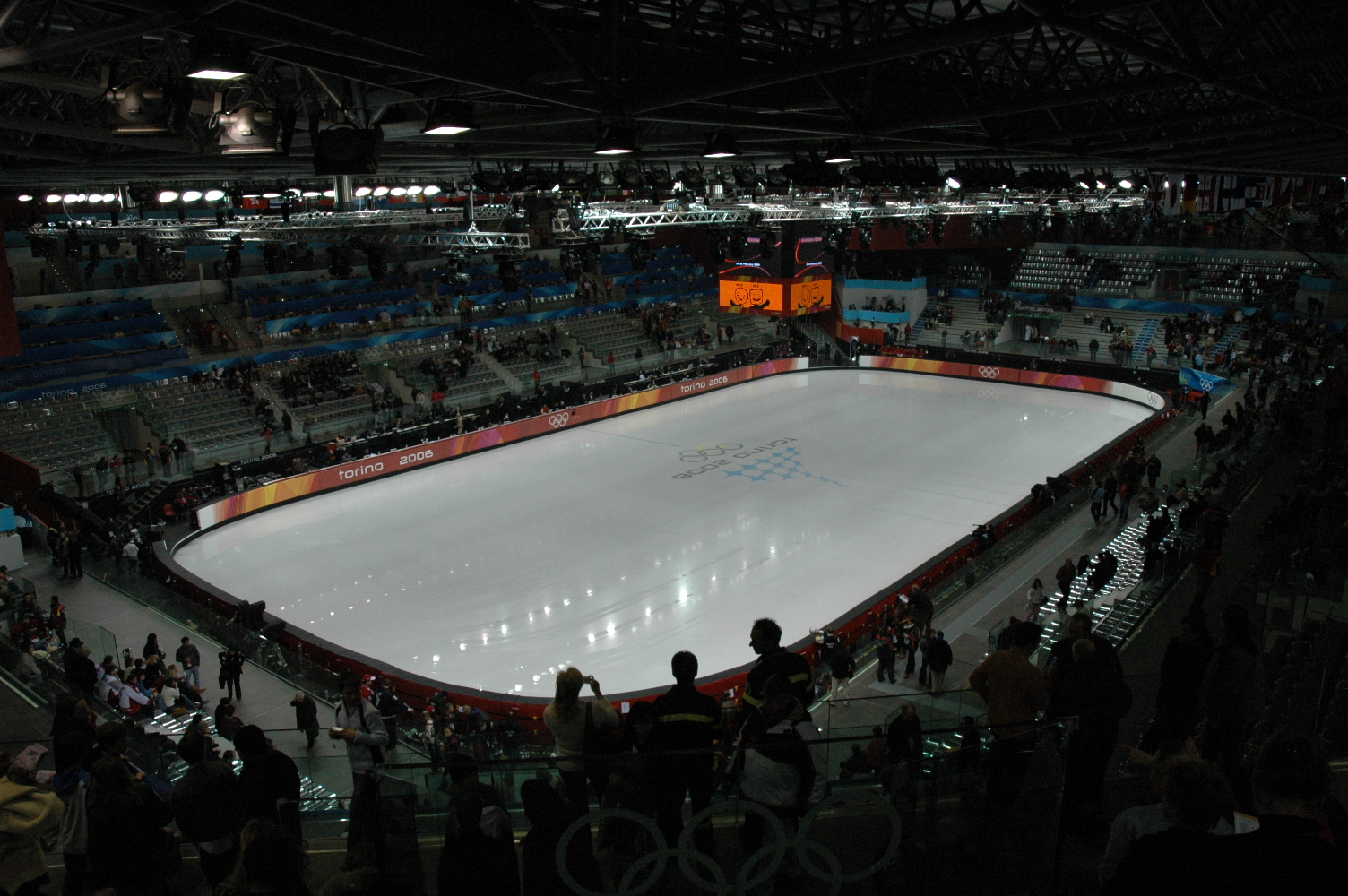
- Venue: Torino Palavela, Turin, Italy
- Dates: 14-16 January

The 2005 European Short Track Speed Skating Championships took place between 14 and 16 January 2005 in Turin, Italy.

== Medal summary ==
=== Medal table ===
* Host nation (Italy)

Rank	Nation	Gold	Silver	Bronze	Total
1	Italy (ITA)*	3	3	3	9
2	Russia (RUS)	3	1	2	6
3	Germany (GER)	2	2	3	7
4	Bulgaria (BUL)	2	1	1	4
5	Netherlands (NED)	0	2	0	2
6	France (FRA)	0	1	0	1
7	Ukraine (UKR)	0	0	1	1
Totals (7 entries)		10	10	10	30

=== Men's events ===
Event	Gold		Silver		Bronze	
500 metres	Fabio Carta (ITA)	43.010	Arian Nachbar (GER)	43.103	Mikhail Rajine (RUS)	45.186
1000 metres	Nicola Franceschina (ITA)	1:33.751	Cees Juffermans (NED)	1:33.809	Arian Nachbar (GER)	1:33.892
1500 metres	Arian Nachbar (GER)	2:22.210	Fabio Carta (ITA)	2:22.243	Nicola Franceschina (ITA)	2:22.485
5000 metre relay	Germany; Arian Nachbar; Sebastian Praus; Thomas Bauer; André Hartwig	7:07.874	Netherlands; Dave Versteeg; Cees Juffermans; Niels Kerstholt; Thomas Mogendorff	7:13.490	Ukraine; Vladimir Grigorev; Yevhen Yakovlev; Volodymyr Cherneha; Mykhaylo Serheyko	7:15.877
Overall Classification	Fabio Carta (ITA)	76 pts.	Arian Nachbar (GER)	73 pts.	Nicola Franceschina (ITA)	55 pts.

=== Women's events ===
Event	Gold		Silver		Bronze	
500 metres	Tatiana Borodulina (RUS)	45.840	Marta Capurso (ITA)	45.885	Evgenia Radanova (BUL)	45.946
1000 metres	Evgenia Radanova (BUL)	1:39.273	Tatiana Borodulina (RUS)	1:39.332	Yvonne Kunze (GER)	1:39.485
1500 metres	Evgenia Radanova (BUL)	2:26.542	Marta Capurso (ITA)	2:26.685	Nina Yevteyeva (RUS)	2:27.042
3000 metre relay	Russia; Marina Tretiakova; Tatiana Borodulina; Nina Yevteyeva; Elizaveta Ivljeva	4:26.415	France; Myrtille Gollin; Stéphanie Bouvier; Céline Lecompére; Choi Min-kyung	4:28.293	Germany; Yvonne Kunze; Christin Priebst; Aika Klein; Tina Grassow	4:34.510
Overall Classification	Tatiana Borodulina (RUS)	89 pts.	Evgenia Radanova (BUL)	89 pts.	Marta Capurso (ITA)	52 pts.

== Participating nations ==
- Austria
- Belgium
- Belarus
- Bulgaria
- Croatia
- Czech Republic
- Denmark
- France
- Germany
- Great Britain
- Hungary
- Israel
- Italy
- Latvia
- Lithuania
- Netherlands
- Poland
- Romania
- Russia
- Slovakia
- Slovenia
- Sweden
- Switzerland
- Ukraine

== See also ==
- Short track speed skating
- European Short Track Speed Skating Championships
