= Short-track speed skating at the 2010 Winter Olympics – Women's 1000 metres =

Women's 1000 metres at the XXI Olympic Winter Games
- Venue: Pacific Coliseum
- Dates: February 24, 26, 2010
- Competitors: 32 from 18 nations

Medalists
1st place, gold medalist(s)		Wang Meng	China
2nd place, silver medalist(s)		Katherine Reutter	United States
3rd place, bronze medalist(s)		Park Seung-hi	South Korea

The women's 1000 metres in short track speed skating at the 2010 Winter Olympics began on 24 February, with the final held on 26 February, at the Pacific Coliseum.

== Records ==
Prior to the competition, the existing world and Olympic records were as follows.

	Name	Nation	Time	Location	Date
World record	Wang Meng	China	1:29.495	Harbin, China	March 15, 2008
Olympic record	Yang Yang	China	1:31.235	Salt Lake City, United States	February 23, 2002

The following records were established during the competition:

Date	Round	Name	Nation	Time	WR	OR
February 24	Heat 2	Kalyna Roberge	Canada	1:31.033		OR
February 24	Heat 5	Katherine Reutter	United States	1:30.508		OR
February 26	Quarterfinals	Zhou Yang	China	1:29.849		OR
February 26	Semifinals	Zhou Yang	China	1:29.049	WR	OR

== Results ==
=== Heats ===
Rank	Heat	Name	Country	Time	Notes
1	1	Park Seung-hi	South Korea	1:31.885	Q
2	1	Tania Vicent	Canada	1:37.561	Q
–	1	Allison Baver	United States		DSQ
–	1	Jorien ter Mors	Netherlands		DSQ
1	2	Kalyna Roberge	Canada	1:31.033	Q
2	2	Bernadett Heidum	Hungary	1:31.125	Q
3	2	Elise Christie	Great Britain	1:31.363	
4	2	Kateřina Novotná	Czech Republic	1:45.300	
1	3	Tatiana Borodulina	Australia	1:32.509	Q
2	3	Mika Ozawa	Japan	1:32.577	Q
3	3	Cecilia Maffei	Italy	1:32.615	
–	3	Liesbeth Mau Asam	Netherlands		DSQ
1	4	Jessica Gregg	Canada	1:32.565	Q
2	4	Arianna Fontana	Italy	1:32.640	Q
3	4	Veronika Windisch	Austria	1:32.775	
4	4	Evgenia Radanova	Bulgaria	1:32.829	
1	5	Katherine Reutter	United States	1:30.508	Q, OR
2	5	Sun Linlin	China	1:30.629	Q
3	5	Ayuko Ito	Japan	1:31.137	
4	5	Nina Yevteyeva	Russia	1:31.302	
1	6	Cho Ha-ri	South Korea	1:35.953	Q
2	6	Stéphanie Bouvier	France	1:36.199	Q
3	6	Biba Sakurai	Japan	1:36.416	
4	6	Valeriya Potemkina	Russia	1:36.438	
1	7	Wang Meng	China	1:30.958	Q
2	7	Annita van Doorn	Netherlands	1:31.516	Q
3	7	Kimberly Derrick	United States	1:31.663	
4	7	Han Yueshuang	Hong Kong	1:38.115	
1	8	Zhou Yang	China	1:30.781	Q
2	8	Paula Bzura	Poland	1:31.338	Q
3	8	Aika Klein	Germany	1:58.857	ADV
–	8	Erika Huszar	Hungary		DSQ

=== Quarterfinals ===
Rank	Heat	Name	Country	Time	Notes
1	1	Park Seung-hi	South Korea	1:30.769	Q
2	1	Kalyna Roberge	Canada	1:30.769	Q
3	1	Annita van Doorn	Netherlands	1:32.067	
4	1	Mika Ozawa	Japan	1:32.183	
1	2	Zhou Yang	China	1:29.849	Q, OR
2	2	Jessica Gregg	Canada	1:30.207	Q
3	2	Bernadett Heidum	Hungary	1:30.313	
4	2	Stéphanie Bouvier	France	1:30.420	
1	3	Katherine Reutter	United States	1:29.955	Q
2	3	Cho Ha-ri	South Korea	1:30.543	Q
3	3	Sun Linlin	China	1:30.589	
4	3	Aika Klein	Germany	1:51.552	
–	3	Tania Vicent	Canada		DSQ
1	4	Wang Meng	China	1:32.267	Q
2	4	Tatiana Borodulina	Australia	1:32.465	Q
3	4	Arianna Fontana	Italy	1:32.472	
4	4	Paula Bzura	Poland	1:32.662	

=== Semifinals ===
Rank	Heat	Name	Country	Time	Notes
1	1	Zhou Yang	China	1:29.049	QA, WR
2	1	Park Seung-hi	South Korea	1:29.165	QA
3	1	Tatiana Borodulina	Australia	1:29.663	QB
4	1	Jessica Gregg	Canada	1:33.139	QB
1	2	Katherine Reutter	United States	1:30.568	QA
2	2	Wang Meng	China	1:30.573	QA
3	2	Kalyna Roberge	Canada	1:30.736	QB
4	2	Cho Ha-ri	South Korea	1:30.792	QB

=== Finals ===
==== Final B (Classification Round) ====
Rank	Name	Country	Time	Notes
4	Cho Ha-ri	South Korea	1:31.932	
5	Kalyna Roberge	Canada	1:32.122	
6	Jessica Gregg	Canada	1:32.333	
7	Tatiana Borodulina	Australia	1:32.661	

==== Final A (Medal Round) ====
Rank	Name	Country	Time	Notes
1st place, gold medalist(s)	Wang Meng	China	1:29.213	
2nd place, silver medalist(s)	Katherine Reutter	United States	1:29.324	
3rd place, bronze medalist(s)	Park Seung-hi	South Korea	1:29.379	
–	Zhou Yang	China		DSQ
