= 2006 European Short Track Speed Skating Championships =

- Venue: Krynica-Zdrój, Poland
- Dates: 20-22 January

The 2006 European Short Track Speed Skating Championships took place between 20 and 22 January 2006 in Krynica-Zdrój, Poland.

== Medal summary ==
=== Medal table ===
* Host nation (Poland)

Rank	Nation	Gold	Silver	Bronze	Total
1	Italy (ITA)	6	5	4	15
2	Bulgaria (BUL)	4	0	0	4
3	France (FRA)	0	3	1	4
4	Belgium (BEL)	0	2	1	3
5	Russia (RUS)	0	0	2	2
6	Germany (GER)	0	0	1	1
6	Hungary (HUN)	0	0	1	1
Totals (7 entries)		10	10	10	30

=== Men's events ===
Event	Gold		Silver		Bronze	
500 metres	Nicola Rodigari (ITA)	42.613	Pieter Gysel (BEL)	43.497	Sergey Prankevich (RUS)	43.590
1000 metres	Fabio Carta (ITA)	1:29.665	Nicola Rodigari (ITA)	1:29.898	Thibaut Fauconnet (FRA)	1:30.427
1500 metres	Nicola Rodigari (ITA)	2:21.500	Pieter Gysel (BEL)	2:21.595	Nicola Franceschina (ITA)	2:21.814
5000 metre relay	Italy; Yuri Confortola; Roberto Serra; Fabio Carta; Nicola Franceschina; Nicola Rodigari	6:58.658	France; Thibaut Fauconnet; Mathieu De Boisset; Jean-Charles Mattei; Maxime Chataignier	7:00.346	Germany; Arian Nachbar; Sebastian Praus; Thomas Bauer; Tyson Heung; André Hartwig	7:00.427
Overall Classification	Nicola Rodigari (ITA)	97 pts.	Fabio Carta (ITA)	78 pts.	Pieter Gysel (BEL)	73 pts.

=== Women's events ===
Event	Gold		Silver		Bronze	
500 metres	Evgenia Radanova (BUL)	45.174	Arianna Fontana (ITA)	45.562	Tatiana Borodulina (RUS)	46.045
1000 metres	Evgenia Radanova (BUL)	1:35.108	Stéphanie Bouvier (FRA)	1:35.453	Marta Capurso (ITA)	1:35.520
1500 metres	Evgenia Radanova (BUL)	2:32.777	Marta Capurso (ITA)	2:33.010	Arianna Fontana (ITA)	2:33.499
3000 metre relay	Italy; Marta Capurso; Mara Zini; Arianna Fontana; Katia Zini	4:27.436	France; Myrtille Gollin; Stéphanie Bouvier; Céline Lecompére; Choi Min-kyung	4:28.388	Hungary; Rózsa Darázs; Bernadett Heidum; Szandra Lajtos; Erika Huszár	4:30.274
Overall Classification	Evgenia Radanova (BUL)	107 pts.	Arianna Fontana (ITA)	55 pts.	Katia Zini (ITA)	50 pts.

== Participating nations ==
- Austria
- Belgium
- Belarus
- Bulgaria
- Czech Republic
- Denmark
- France
- Germany
- Great Britain
- Hungary
- Israel
- Italy
- Latvia
- Lithuania
- Netherlands
- Poland
- Romania
- Russia
- Serbia
- Slovakia
- Slovenia
- Sweden
- Switzerland
- Ukraine

== See also ==
- Short track speed skating
- European Short Track Speed Skating Championships
