= 2009 European Short Track Speed Skating Championships =

- Venue: Turin, Italy
- Dates: 16–18 January

The 2009 European Short Track Speed Skating Championships took place between 16 and 18 January 2009 in Turin, Italy.

== Medal summary ==
=== Medal table ===
* Host nation (Italy)

Rank	Nation	Gold	Silver	Bronze	Total
1	Italy*	6	2	2	10
2	Hungary	1	1	6	8
3	Czech Republic	1	1	0	2
3	Latvia	1	1	0	2
5	Belgium	1	0	0	1
6	France	0	2	1	3
7	Netherlands	0	1	1	2
8	Bulgaria	0	1	0	1
8	Germany	0	1	0	1
Totals (9 entries)		10	10	10	30

=== Men's events ===
Event	Gold		Silver		Bronze	
500 metres	Nicola Rodigari (ITA)	42.254	Viktor Knoch (HUN)	42.286	Yuri Confortola (ITA)	42.668
1000 metres	Wim de Deyne (BEL)	1:28.231	Yuri Confortola (ITA)	1:28.405	Viktor Knoch (HUN)	1:28.558
1500 metres	Haralds Silovs (LAT)	2:16.109	Nicola Rodigari (ITA)	2:16.190	Viktor Knoch (HUN)	2:16.277
5000 metre relay	Italy; Nicola Rodigari; Roberto Serra; Yuri Confortola; Claudio Rinaldi; Edoardo Reggiani	6:56.928	Netherlands; Freek van der Wart; Rudy Koek; Daan Breeuwsma; Niels Kerstholt; Sjinkie Knegt	6:57.314	Hungary; Bence Béres; Péter Darázs; Gábor Galambos; Viktor Knoch	6:57.617
Overall Classification	Nicola Rodigari (ITA)	76 pts.	Haralds Silovs (LAT)	55 pts.	Viktor Knoch (HUN)	55 pts.

=== Women's events ===
Event	Gold		Silver		Bronze	
500 metres	Arianna Fontana (ITA)	45.885	Evgenia Radanova (BUL)	46.107	Erika Huszár (HUN)	46.140
1000 metres	Arianna Fontana (ITA)	1:34.173	Stéphanie Bouvier (FRA)	1:34.574	Bernadett Heidum (HUN)	1:34.761
1500 metres	Kateřina Novotná (CZE)	2:26.503	Stéphanie Bouvier (FRA)	2:26.553	Arianna Fontana (ITA)	2:26.809
3000 metre relay	Hungary; Erika Huszár; Rózsa Darázs; Bernadett Heidum; Andrea Keszler	4:22.769	Germany; Bianca Walter; Aika Klein; Christin Priebst; Susanne Rudolph	4:24.411	Netherlands; Maaike Vos; Annita van Doorn; Liesbeth Mau-Asam; Sanne van Kerkhof	4:28.943
Overall Classification	Arianna Fontana (ITA)	83 pts.	Kateřina Novotná (CZE)	76 pts.	Stéphanie Bouvier (FRA)	63 pts.

== Participating nations ==
- Austria
- Belarus
- Belgium
- Bosnia and Herzegovina
- Bulgaria
- Croatia
- Czech Republic
- France
- Germany
- Great Britain
- Hungary
- Israel
- Italy
- Latvia
- Lithuania
- Netherlands
- Poland
- Romania
- Russia
- Slovakia
- Slovenia
- Sweden
- Ukraine

== See also ==
- Short track speed skating
- European Short Track Speed Skating Championships
