= 2004 European Short Track Speed Skating Championships =

- Venue: Zoetermeer, Netherlands
- Dates: 16-18 January

The 2004 European Short Track Speed Skating Championships took place between 16 and 18 January 2004 in Zoetermeer, Netherlands.

== Medal summary ==
=== Medal table ===
* Host nation (Netherlands)

Rank	Nation	Gold	Silver	Bronze	Total
1	Italy (ITA)	5	6	4	15
2	Bulgaria (BUL)	4	0	0	4
3	Russia (RUS)	1	4	2	7
4	Germany (GER)	0	0	2	2
5	Belgium (BEL)	0	0	1	1
5	Czech Republic (CZE)	0	0	1	1
Totals (6 entries)		10	10	10	30

=== Men's events ===
Event	Gold		Silver		Bronze	
500 metres	Nicola Franceschina (ITA)	42.845	Nicola Rodigari (ITA)	42.933	Sergey Prankevich (RUS)	43.023
1000 metres	Fabio Carta (ITA)	1:35.599	Nicola Franceschina (ITA)	1:35.613	Nicola Rodigari (ITA)	1:35.716
1500 metres	Nicola Rodigari (ITA)	2:23.483	Fabio Carta (ITA)	2:23.501	Pieter Gysel (BEL)	2:23.715
5000 metre relay	Italy; Nicola Franceschina; Roberto Serra; Fabio Carta; Nicola Rodigari; Maurizio Carnino	7:11.688	Russia; Sergey Prankevich; Dmitri Vasilenko; Yaroslav Karpoukhin; Alexandr Gertsikov	7:11.966	Germany; Arian Nachbar; Sebastian Praus; Thomas Bauer; André Hartwig	7:13.883
Overall Classification	Nicola Rodigari (ITA)	81 pts.	Fabio Carta (ITA)	63 pts.	Nicola Franceschina (ITA)	57 pts.

=== Women's events ===
Event	Gold		Silver		Bronze	
500 metres	Evgenia Radanova (BUL)	44.882	Katia Zini (ITA)	45.636	Kateřina Novotná (CZE)	46.050
1000 metres	Evgenia Radanova (BUL)	1:37.158	Tatiana Borodulina (RUS)	1:37.881	Nina Yevteyeva (RUS)	1:37.891
1500 metres	Evgenia Radanova (BUL)	2:48.282	Tatiana Borodulina (RUS)	2:48.429	Marta Capurso (ITA)	2:48.533
3000 metre relay	Russia; Marina Tretiakova; Tatiana Borodulina; Nina Yevteyeva; Elizaveta Ivljeva	4:26.687	Italy; Catia Borrello; Marta Capurso; Evelina Rodigari; Mara Zini; Katia Zini	4:26.764	Germany; Yvonne Kunze; Christin Priebst; Aika Klein; Ulrike Lehmann	4:27.055
Overall Classification	Evgenia Radanova (BUL)	104 pts.	Tatiana Borodulina (RUS)	76 pts.	Marta Capurso (ITA)	34 pts.

== Participating nations ==
- Austria
- Belgium
- Belarus
- Bulgaria
- Croatia
- Czech Republic
- France
- Germany
- Great Britain
- Hungary
- Israel
- Italy
- Latvia
- Netherlands
- Norway
- Poland
- Romania
- Russia
- Serbia and Montenegro
- Slovakia
- Slovenia
- Sweden
- Switzerland
- Ukraine

== See also ==
- Short track speed skating
- European Short Track Speed Skating Championships
