= 2002 European Short Track Speed Skating Championships =

- Venue: Grenoble, France
- Dates: 11-13 January

The 2002 European Short Track Speed Skating Championships took place between 11 and 13 January 2002 in Grenoble, France.

== Medal summary ==
=== Medal table ===
* Host nation (France)

Rank	Nation	Gold	Silver	Bronze	Total
1	Italy (ITA)	6	5	6	17
2	Bulgaria (BUL)	4	1	0	5
3	Great Britain (GBR)	0	2	1	3
4	France (FRA)*	0	1	1	2
5	Belgium (BEL)	0	1	0	1
6	Germany (GER)	0	0	2	2
Totals (6 entries)		10	10	10	30

=== Men's events ===
Event	Gold		Silver		Bronze	
500 metres	Nicola Rodigari (ITA)	43.010	Nicola Franceschina (ITA)	43.057	Fabio Carta (ITA)	43.889
1000 metres	Fabio Carta (ITA)	1:32.915	Bruno Loscos (FRA)	1:33.192	Nicola Rodigari (ITA)	1:33.204
1500 metres	Fabio Carta (ITA)	2:20.849	Nicola Rodigari (ITA)	2:21.041	Nicola Franceschina (ITA)	2:22.392
5000 metre relay	Italy; Nicola Franceschina; Michele Antonioli; Fabio Carta; Nicola Rodigari; Michele Ponti	7:20.752	Belgium; Simon Van Vossel; Pieter Gysel; Wim De Deyne; Ward Janssens	7:22.452	Germany; Arian Nachbar; Holger Helas; André Hartwig; Sebastian Praus	7:33.232
Overall Classification	Fabio Carta (ITA)	115 pts.	Nicola Rodigari (ITA)	81 pts.	Bruno Loscos (FRA)	42 pts.

=== Women's events ===
Event	Gold		Silver		Bronze	
500 metres	Evgenia Radanova (BUL)	45.565	Mara Zini (ITA)	45.673	Marta Capurso (ITA)	45.767
1000 metres	Evgenia Radanova (BUL)	1:38.167	Joanna Williams (GBR)	1:38.626	Katia Zini (ITA)	1:38.711
1500 metres	Evgenia Radanova (BUL)	2:48.183	Joanna Williams (GBR)	2:48.658	Mara Zini (ITA)	2:48.720
3000 metre relay	Italy; Marinella Canclini; Marta Capurso; Evelina Rodigari; Mara Zini; Katia Zini	4:29.255	Bulgaria; Evgenia Radanova; Marina Georgieva-Nikolova; Anna Krasteva; Kristina Vuteva; Daniela Vlaeva	4:31.030	Germany; Yvonne Kunze; Christin Priebst; Susanne Rudolph; Ulrike Lehmann; Yvonne Bolt	4:31.885
Overall Classification	Evgenia Radanova (BUL)	136 pts.	Joanna Williams (GBR)	60 pts.	Mara Zini (ITA)	55 pts.

== Participating nations ==
- Austria
- Belgium
- Belarus
- Bulgaria
- Croatia
- Czech Republic
- France
- Germany
- Great Britain
- Hungary
- Israel
- Italy
- Lithuania
- Netherlands
- Norway
- Poland
- Romania
- Russia
- Serbia and Montenegro
- Slovakia
- Slovenia
- Sweden
- Switzerland
- Ukraine

== See also ==
- Short track speed skating
- European Short Track Speed Skating Championships
