= 2007 European Short Track Speed Skating Championships =

- Venue: Sheffield, United Kingdom
- Dates: 19–21 January

The 2007 European Short Track Speed Skating Championships took place between 19 and 21 January 2007 in Sheffield, United Kingdom.

== Medal summary ==
=== Medal table ===
* Host nation (Great Britain)

Rank	Nation	Gold	Silver	Bronze	Total
1	Italy (ITA)	3	4	4	11
2	Bulgaria (BUL)	3	1	0	4
3	France (FRA)	2	1	1	4
4	Germany (GER)	2	0	0	2
5	Hungary (HUN)	0	2	1	3
6	Great Britain (GBR)*	0	1	1	2
7	Belgium (BEL)	0	1	0	1
8	Netherlands (NED)	0	0	2	2
9	Russia (RUS)	0	0	1	1
Totals (9 entries)		10	10	10	30

=== Men's events ===
Event	Gold		Silver		Bronze	
500 metres	Thibaut Fauconnet (FRA)	42.864	Nicola Rodigari (ITA)	42.910	Gábor Galambos (HUN)	42.946
1000 metres	Nicola Rodigari (ITA)	1:27.518	Yuri Confortola (ITA)	1:27.524	Denis Bellotti (ITA)	1:27.584
1500 metres	Nicola Rodigari (ITA)	2:17.297	Viktor Knoch (HUN)	2:17.377	Niels Kerstholt (NED)	2:17.427
5000 metre relay	Germany; Robert Becker; Paul Herrmann; Sebastian Praus; Tyson Heung	7:03.185	Hungary; Márton Tamus; Gábor Galambos; Péter Darázs; Viktor Knoch	7:05.326	Great Britain; Paul Worth; Tom Iveson; Jon Eley; Paul Stanley	7:09.812
Overall Classification	Nicola Rodigari (ITA)	102 pts.	Pieter Gysel (BEL)	50 pts.	Yuri Confortola (ITA)	47 pts.

=== Women's events ===
Event	Gold		Silver		Bronze	
500 metres	Evgenia Radanova (BUL)	44.595	Sarah Lindsay (GBR)	44.690	Ekaterina Belova (RUS)	44.713
1000 metres	Evgenia Radanova (BUL)	1:33.235	Marina Georgieva-Nikolova (BUL)	1:33.360	Stéphanie Bouvier (FRA)	1:34.026
1500 metres	Stéphanie Bouvier (FRA)	2:28.915	Katia Zini (ITA)	2:28.962	Arianna Fontana (ITA)	2:28.977
3000 metre relay	Germany; Susanne Rudolph; Christin Priebst; Tina Grassow; Julia Riedel	4:26.940	Italy; Marta Capurso; Mara Zini; Arianna Fontana; Katia Zini; Cecilia Maffei	4:37.427	Netherlands; Ellen Wiegers; Maaike Vos; Annita van Doorn; Jorien ter Mors	4:40.141
Overall Classification	Evgenia Radanova (BUL)	102 pts.	Stéphanie Bouvier (FRA)	68 pts.	Katia Zini (ITA)	39 pts.

== Participating nations ==
- Austria
- Belgium
- Belarus
- Bulgaria
- Croatia
- Czech Republic
- Denmark
- France
- Germany
- Great Britain
- Hungary
- Israel
- Italy
- Latvia
- Netherlands
- Poland
- Romania
- Russia
- Serbia
- Slovakia
- Slovenia
- Sweden
- Switzerland
- Ukraine

== See also ==
- Short track speed skating
- European Short Track Speed Skating Championships
