= 2003 European Short Track Speed Skating Championships =

- Venue: Saint Petersburg, Russia
- Dates: 17–19 January

The 2003 European Short Track Speed Skating Championships took place between 17 and 19 January 2003 in Saint Petersburg, Russia.

== Medal summary ==
=== Medal table ===
* Host nation (Russia)

Rank	Nation	Gold	Silver	Bronze	Total
1	Italy (ITA)	6	4	4	14
2	Bulgaria (BUL)	4	0	0	4
3	Russia (RUS)*	0	2	3	5
4	France (FRA)	0	2	2	4
5	Belgium (BEL)	0	1	0	1
5	Great Britain (GBR)	0	1	0	1
7	Netherlands (NED)	0	0	1	1
Totals (7 entries)		10	10	10	30

=== Men's events ===
Event	Gold		Silver		Bronze	
500 metres	Fabio Carta (ITA)	42.699	Pieter Gysel (BEL)	43.240	Michele Antonioli (ITA)	43.286
1000 metres	Michele Antonioli (ITA)	1:30.928	Nicola Franceschina (ITA)	1:30.937	Fabio Carta (ITA)	1:31.035
1500 metres	Fabio Carta (ITA)	2:23.950	Michele Antonioli (ITA)	2:23.999	Nicola Franceschina (ITA)	2:24.055
5000 metre relay	Italy; Nicola Franceschina; Michele Antonioli; Fabio Carta; Nicola Rodigari; Michele Ponti	7:00.303	Great Britain; Tom Iveson; Jon Eley; Leon Flack; Paul Stanley	7:10.708	France; Jean-Charles Mattei; Guillaume Mathieu; Julien Morelle; Thibaut Fauconnet	7:13.842
Overall Classification	Fabio Carta (ITA)	115 pts.	Michele Antonioli (ITA)	69 pts.	Nicola Franceschina (ITA)	47 pts.

=== Women's events ===
Event	Gold		Silver		Bronze	
500 metres	Evgenia Radanova (BUL)	45.086	Tatiana Borodulina (RUS)	45.154	Stéphanie Bouvier (FRA)	49.435
1000 metres	Evgenia Radanova (BUL)	1:43.993	Marta Capurso (ITA)	1:44.483	Nina Yevteyeva (RUS)	1:44.495
1500 metres	Evgenia Radanova (BUL)	2:34.835	Stéphanie Bouvier (FRA)	2:35.488	Nina Yevteyeva (RUS)	2:35.594
3000 metre relay	Italy; Catia Borrello; Marta Capurso; Evelina Rodigari; Mara Zini; Katia Zini	4:22.180	Russia; Marina Tretiakova; Tatiana Borodulina; Nina Yevteyeva; Nataliya Dmitriyeva	4:32.262	Netherlands; Anouk Wiegers; Mariëlle Lootsma; Melanie de Lange; Maureen de Lange	4:37.737
Overall Classification	Evgenia Radanova (BUL)	136 pts.	Stéphanie Bouvier (FRA)	55 pts.	Nina Yevteyeva (RUS)	34 pts.

== Participating nations ==
- Austria
- Belgium
- Belarus
- Bulgaria
- Croatia
- Czech Republic
- France
- Germany
- Great Britain
- Hungary
- Israel
- Italy
- Latvia
- Lithuania
- Netherlands
- Norway
- Poland
- Romania
- Russia
- Slovakia
- Slovenia
- Sweden
- Switzerland
- Ukraine

== See also ==
- Short track speed skating
- European Short Track Speed Skating Championships
