= Juffermans =

Juffermans is a patronymic surname that originated in the Netherlands.

- Cees Juffermans (born 1982) Former Olympic short track speed skater
- Jan Juffermans (born 1945) Author and environmental activist
- Joost Juffermans (born 1975) Speed skater
