= Ulrike Lehmann =

German speed skater

Personal information
- Nationality: German
- Born: 11 June 1982 (age 44) Rostock, East Germany

Sport
- Sport: Short track speed skating
Medal record
Women's short track speed skating
Representing Germany
European Championships
Bronze medal – third place	2002 Grenoble	3000 m relay
Bronze medal – third place	2002 Zoetermeer	3000 m relay

Ulrike Lehmann (born 11 June 1982) is a German short track speed skater. She competed in the women's 3000 metre relay event at the 2002 Winter Olympics.
