= Sebastian Praus =

German speed skater

Personal information
- Born: 31 August 1980 (age 45) Dresden, East Germany
- Height: 5 ft 11 in (180 cm)
- Weight: 163 lb (74 kg)

Sport
- Country: Germany
- Sport: Short track speed skating

Achievements and titles
- World finals: 2
- Highest world ranking: 7 (1500m)
Medal record
Men's short track speed skating
Representing Germany
World Championships
| Bronze medal – third place | 2010 Sofia | 5000 m relay |
European Championships
| Gold medal – first place | 2005 Turin | 5000 m relay |
| Gold medal – first place | 2007 Sheffield | 5000 m relay |
| Silver medal – second place | 2010 Dresden | 5000 m relay |
| Bronze medal – third place | 2002 Grenoble | 5000 m relay |
| Bronze medal – third place | 2004 Zoetermeer | 5000 m relay |
| Bronze medal – third place | 2006 Krynica-Zdrój | 5000 m relay |

Sebastian Praus (born 31 August 1980 in Dresden) is a German short-track speed-skater.

Praus competed at the 2006 and 2010 Winter Olympics for Germany. In 2006, he finished third in the opening heat of the 1000 metres, but was advanced to the quarterfinals, where he finished third again, failing to advance. In the 1500 metres, he finished fourth in his opening race, not advancing. He also competed in the 5000 metre relay, finishing third in the semifinal and second in the B Final to end up 7th overall. In 2010, he finished third in the opening round o fht e1500 metres, then third in the semifinal, advancing to the B Final. He finished 5th in that race to end up 11th overall. He again raced with the German 5000 metre relay team, which had an identical result, ending up 7th. His best overall finish was in the 2006 1000 metres, when he placed 10th overall.

As of 2013, Praus's best performance at the World Championships came in 2010, when he won a bronze medal as a member of the German 5000m relay team. His best individual performance at a World Championships was in 2004, when he came 10th in the 1500 metres. He has also won two gold medals as a member of the German relay team at the European Championships.

As of 2013, Praus has four ISU Short Track Speed Skating World Cup podium finishes, all bronze medals as part of the German relay team. His top World Cup ranking is 7th, in the 1500 metres in 2004–05.

== World Cup podiums ==
| Date | Season | Location | Rank | Event |
| 8 December 2002 | 2002–03 | Bormio | 3rd place, bronze medalist(s) | 5000m Relay |
| 10 December 2006 | 2006–07 | Montreal | 3rd place, bronze medalist(s) | 5000m Relay |
| 8 February 2009 | 2008–09 | Sofia | 3rd place, bronze medalist(s) | 5000m Relay |
| 15 February 2009 | 2008–09 | Dresden | 3rd place, bronze medalist(s) | 5000m Relay |
