= Wim De Deyne =

Belgian speed skater

Personal information
- Nationality: Belgian
- Born: 12 December 1977 (age 48) Bruges, Belgium
- Height: 176 cm (5 ft 9 in)

Sport
- Sport: Short track speed skating
Medal record
Men's short track speed skating
Representing Belgium
European Championships
Gold medal – first place	2009 Torino	1000 m
Silver medal – second place	2002 Grenoble	5000 m relay

Wim De Deyne (born 12 December 1977) is a Belgian short track speed skater. He competed at the 2002 Winter Olympics and the 2006 Winter Olympics.
