= Susanne Rudolph =

German speed skater

Personal information
- Nationality: German
- Born: 10 February 1981 (age 45) Wuppertal, Germany

Sport
- Sport: Short track speed skating
Medal record
Women's short track speed skating
Representing Germany
European Championships
| Bronze medal – third place | 2002 Grenoble | 3000 m relay |
| Gold medal – first place | 2007 Sheffield | 3000 m relay |
| Bronze medal – third place | 2008 Ventspils | 3000 m relay |
| Silver medal – second place | 2009 Turin | 3000 m relay |

Susanne Rudolph (born 10 February 1981) is a German short track speed skater. She competed at the 2002 Winter Olympics and the 2006 Winter Olympics.
