= André Hartwig =

German speed skater

Personal information
- Nationality: German
- Born: 14 March 1983 (age 43) Rostock, Germany
- Height: 184 cm (6 ft 0 in)

Sport
- Sport: Short track speed skating
Medal record
Men's short track speed skating
Representing Germany
European Championships
Gold medal – first place	2005 Turin	5000 m relay
Bronze medal – third place	2002 Grenoble	5000 m relay
Bronze medal – third place	2004 Zoetermeer	5000 m relay
Bronze medal – third place	2006 Krynica-Zdrój	5000 m relay

André Hartwig (born 14 March 1983) is a German short track speed skater. He competed at the 2002 Winter Olympics and the 2006 Winter Olympics.
