= Fabio Carta =

Italian speed skater (born 1977)

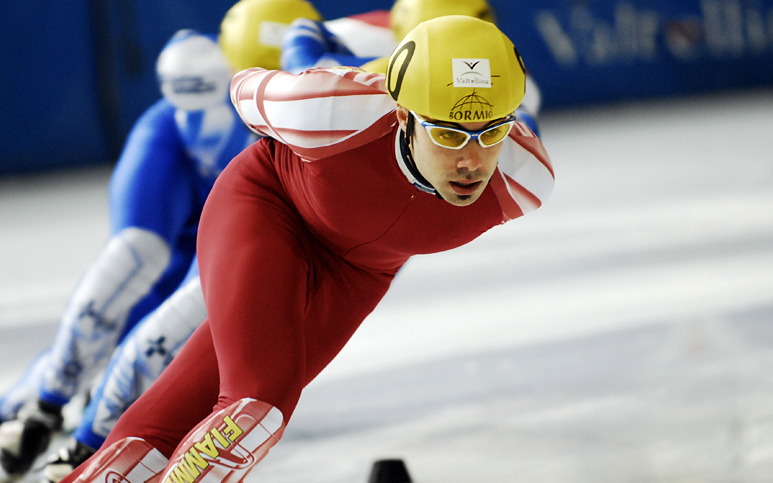
- Carta in 2007

Personal information
- Born: 6 October 1977 (age 49)

Sport
- Country: Italy
- Sport: Short track speed skating
Medal record
Representing Italy
Olympic Games
Silver medal – second place	2002 Salt Lake City	5000 m relay
World Championships
Gold medal – first place	1999 Sofia	1500m
Silver medal – second place	1998 Vienna	Overall
Silver medal – second place	1998 Vienna	1500m
Silver medal – second place	2002 Montreal	500m
Bronze medal – third place	1998 Vienna	1000m
Bronze medal – third place	1998 Vienna	3000m
Bronze medal – third place	1999 Sofia	Overall
Bronze medal – third place	1999 Sofia	500m
Bronze medal – third place	1999 Sofia	3000m
Bronze medal – third place	2002 Montreal	Overall
Bronze medal – third place	2002 Montreal	3000m
Bronze medal – third place	2004 Gothenburg	1000m
Bronze medal – third place	1997 Nagano	5000m Relay
Bronze medal – third place	2000 Sheffield	5000m Relay
Bronze medal – third place	2004 Gothenburg	5000m Relay
World Team Championships
Silver medal – second place	2005 Chuncheon	Team
Bronze medal – third place	1996 Lake Placid	Team
Bronze medal – third place	1998 Bormio	Team
Bronze medal – third place	2000 Hague	Team
Bronze medal – third place	2007 Budapest	Team
European Championships
Gold medal – first place	1997 Malmö	Overall
Gold medal – first place	1997 Malmö	1000m
Gold medal – first place	1997 Malmö	3000m
Gold medal – first place	1998 Budapest	Overall
Gold medal – first place	1999 Oberstdorf	Overall
Gold medal – first place	1999 Oberstdorf	5000m Relay
Gold medal – first place	2000 Bormio	Overall
Gold medal – first place	2000 Bormio	5000m Relay
Gold medal – first place	2002 Grenoble	Overall
Gold medal – first place	2002 Grenoble	1000m
Gold medal – first place	2002 Grenoble	1500m
Gold medal – first place	2002 Grenoble	3000m S.F
Gold medal – first place	2002 Grenoble	5000m Relay
Gold medal – first place	2003 St. Petersburg	Overall
Gold medal – first place	2003 St. Petersburg	500m
Gold medal – first place	2003 St. Petersburg	1500m
Gold medal – first place	2003 St. Petersburg	3000m S.F
Gold medal – first place	2003 St. Petersburg	5000m Relay
Gold medal – first place	2004 Zoetermeer	Overall
Gold medal – first place	2004 Zoetermeer	1000m
Gold medal – first place	2004 Zoetermeer	5000m Relay
Gold medal – first place	2005 Turin	Overall
Gold medal – first place	2005 Turin	500m
Gold medal – first place	2006 Krynica-Zdrój	Overall
Gold medal – first place	2006 Krynica-Zdrój	1000m
Gold medal – first place	2006 Krynica-Zdrój	3000m
Gold medal – first place	2006 Krynica-Zdrój	5000m Relay
Gold medal – first place	2008 Ventspils	5000m Relay
Silver medal – second place	1998 Budapest	500m
Silver medal – second place	1998 Budapest	1000m
Silver medal – second place	1998 Budapest	3000m
Silver medal – second place	1998 Budapest	5000m Relay
Silver medal – second place	2004 Zoetermeer	Overall
Silver medal – second place	2004 Zoetermeer	1500m
Silver medal – second place	2005 Turin	1500m
Silver medal – second place	2006 Krynica-Zdrój	Overall
Bronze medal – third place	1997 Malmö	5000m Relay
Bronze medal – third place	2002 Grenoble	500m
Bronze medal – third place	2003 St. Petersburg	1000m
Bronze medal – third place	2005 Turin	3000m S.F
Goodwill Games
Silver medal – second place	2000	500 m

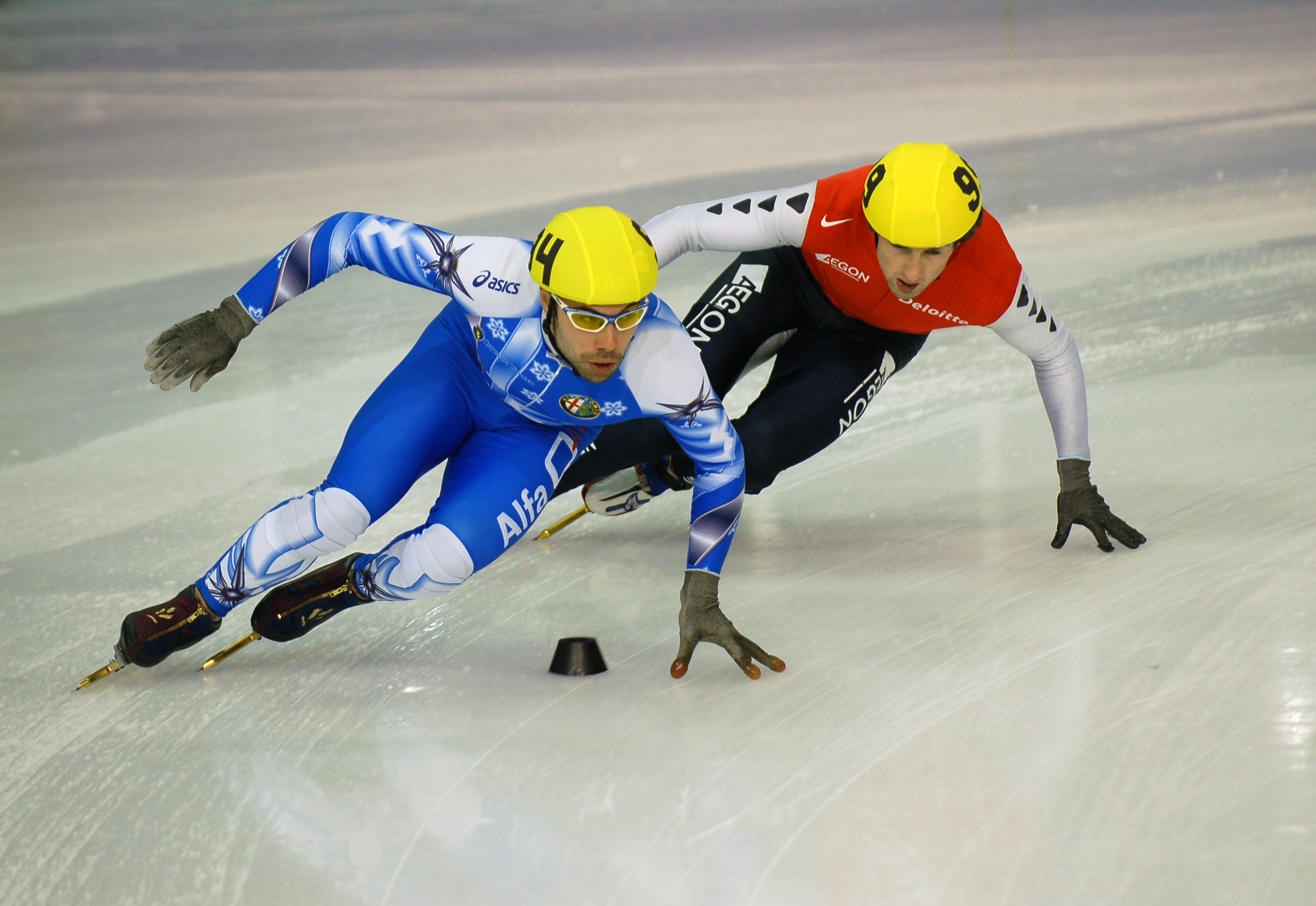
Fabio Carta (left) in Sheffield 2007

Fabio Carta (born 6 October 1977 in Turin) is an Italian short track speed skater who competed in the 1998, the 2002, and the 2006 Winter Olympics.

== 1998 Olympics ==
In 1998 he was a member of the Italian relay team which finished fourth in the 5000 metre relay competition. In the 1000 metre event he finished sixth and in the 500 metre contest he finished eleventh.

== 2002 Olympics ==
Four years later he won the silver medal in the 5000 metre relay contest. In the 1500 metre event he finished fourth, in the 1000 metre contest he finished sixth, and in the 500 metre competition he finished ninth.

== 2006 Olympics ==
At the 2006 Games he was part of the Italian team which finished fourth in the 5000 metre relay competition. In the 1500 metre event he finished seventh and in the 1000 metre contest he finished eighth.
