= Arian Nachbar =

German speed skater

Personal information
- Nationality: German
- Born: 6 January 1977 (age 49) Rostock, Germany
- Height: 173 cm (5 ft 8 in)

Sport
- Sport: Short track speed skating
Medal record
Men's short track speed skating
Representing Germany
European Championships
Silver medal – second place	1999 Oberstdorf	500 m
Bronze medal – third place	2001 The Hague	1000 m
Bronze medal – third place	2002 Grenoble	5000 m relay
Bronze medal – third place	2004 Zoetermeer	5000 m relay
Silver medal – second place	2005 Turin	500 m
Bronze medal – third place	2005 Turin	1000 m
Gold medal – first place	2005 Turin	1500 m
Gold medal – first place	2005 Turin	5000 m relay
Silver medal – second place	2005 Turin	Overall
Bronze medal – third place	2006 Krynica-Zdrój	5000 m relay

Arian Nachbar (born 6 January 1977) is a German short track speed skater. He competed at the 1998 Winter Olympics, the 2002 Winter Olympics and the 2006 Winter Olympics.
