= Eva Farkas (speed skater) =

Hungarian speed skater

Personal information
- Nationality: Hungarian
- Born: 18 June 1986 (age 38); Jászberény, Hungary

Sport
- Sport: Short track speed skating

Eva Farkas (born 18 June 1986) is a Hungarian short track speed skater. She competed in the women's 1500 metres event at the 2002 Winter Olympics.
