= Evita Krievāne =

Latvian short track speed skater

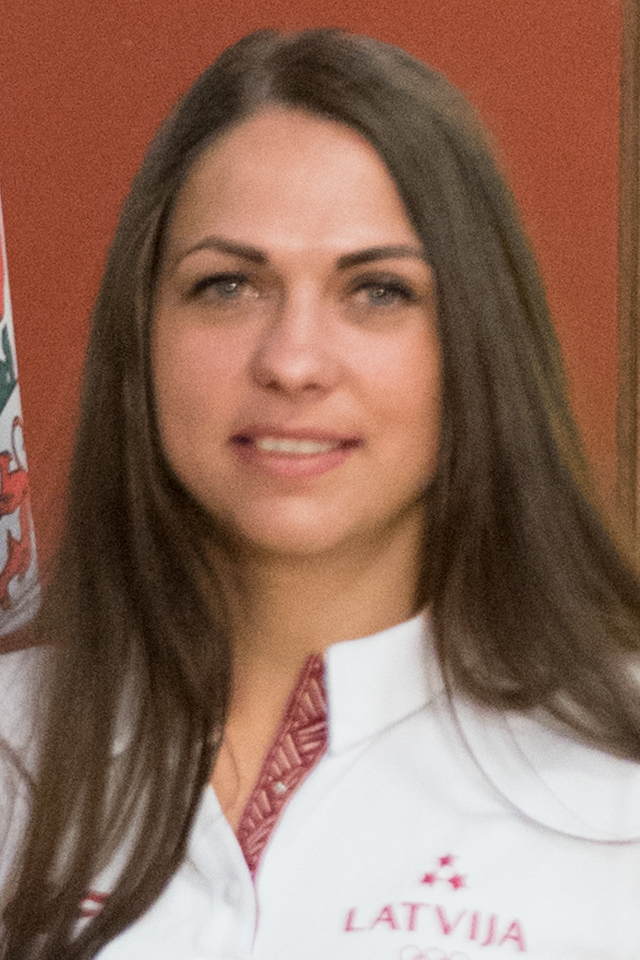
- Krievāne in 2018

Personal information
- Born: 11 June 1987 (age 37); Riga, Latvia
- Height: 167 cm (5 ft 6 in)
- Weight: 58 kg (128 lb)

Sport
- Country: Latvia
- Sport: Speed skating
- Event: Short track

Evita Krievāne (born 11 June 1987) is a Latvian short track speed skater. She was born in Riga. She competed in 1000 metres and 1500 metres at the 2006 Winter Olympics in Turin.
