= 1998 World Short Track Speed Skating Team Championships =

Short track team championship

- Venue: Palaghiaccio Braulio Bormio
- Location: Bormio, Italy
- Start date: 26 March 1998
- End date: 29 March 1998

The 1998 World Short Track Speed Skating Team Championships is the 8th edition of the World Short Track Speed Skating Team Championships which took place on 26-29 March 1998 in Bormio, Italy.

All teams were represented by four athletes at 500 m and 1000 m as well as by two athletes at 3000 m. At 500 m and 1000 m, athletes were drafted into the heats of four. At 3000 m, athletes were drafted into two heats. All athletes in each heat were from different countries. The best four team advanced for the relay competition.

== Medal winners ==
| Event | Gold | Silver | Bronze |
|---|---|---|---|
| Men | Canada; Marc Gagnon; Derrick Campbell; Éric Bédard; François Drolet; Mathieu Turcotte | South Korea; Chae Ji-hoon; Lee Jun-hwan; Lee Ho-eung; Kim Dong-sung; Kim Sun-tae | Italy; Fabio Carta; Michele Antonioli; Nicola Franceschina; Maurizio Carnino; Nicola Rodigari |
| Women | China; Wang Chunlu; Yang Yang (A); Yang Yang (S); Sun Dandan; Qin Na | South Korea; Chun Lee-kyung; Won Hye-kyung; An Sang-mi; Kim Yun-mi; Choi Min-kyung | Canada; Isabelle Charest; Christine Boudrias; Annie Perreault; Tania Vicent; Chantale Sevigny |

== Results ==
=== Men ===
| Rank | Nation | Total |
|---|---|---|
| 1st place, gold medalist(s) | Canada | 48 |
| 2nd place, silver medalist(s) | South Korea | 45 |
| 3rd place, bronze medalist(s) | Italy | 42 |
| 4 | China | 34 |
| 5 | Japan | 32 |
| 6 | Germany | 18 |
| 7 | Hungary | 14 |

=== Women ===
| Rank | Nation | Total |
|---|---|---|
| 1st place, gold medalist(s) | China | 61 |
| 2nd place, silver medalist(s) | South Korea | 49 |
| 3rd place, bronze medalist(s) | Canada | 42 |
| 4 | Italy | 34 |
| 5 | Netherlands | 20 |
| 6 | Bulgaria | 19 |
| 7 | Germany | 14 |
