= Erika Huszár =

Hungarian speed skater

Personal information
- Born: November 22, 1983 (age 42) Jászberény, Hungary
- Height: 5 ft 5 in (165 cm)
- Weight: 130 lb (59 kg)

Sport
- Country: Hungary
- Sport: Short track speed skating

Achievements and titles
- Olympic finals: 2
- Highest world ranking: 6 (overall)

Erika Huszár (born November 22, 1983, in Jászberény) is a Hungarian short track speed skater.

Huszár competed at the 2006 and 2010 Winter Olympics for Hungary. In 2006, she finished second in her opening round race of the 500 metres, advancing to the quarterfinals, where she finished fourth, failing to advance further. In the opening race of the 1000 metres, she finished second and advanced to the quarterfinals, where she finished third, not advancing further. In the 1500 metres, she finished second in her opening race, and second in her semifinal to advance to the A final, where she finished fourth, two seconds behind gold medalist Jin Sun-Yu and one second behind bronze medalist Wang Meng.

In 2010, she was disqualified in the first round of the 1000 metres, and finished third in the first round of the 500 metres, failing to advance in either. In the 1500 metres, she finished third in the opening heat, then won her semifinal, but finished sixth in the A final, again around one second short of a medal. She was also a member of the Hungarian 3000 metre relay team, which finished fourth in the semifinals and second in the B Final, ending up fifth overall.

As of 2013, Huszár's best finish at the World Championships, is 6th, in 2009 as part of the Hungarian 3000 metre relay team. Her best individual performance at a World Championships was also in 2009, when she came 8th in the 500 metres. She has also won a gold medal as a member of the Hungarian relay team at the 2009 European Championships.

As of 2013, Huszár has one ISU Short Track Speed Skating World Cup victory, which came as a member of the Hungarian relay team at Hangzhou in 2005–06. She also has a silver medal from the same event, in the 1500 metres. Her top World Cup ranking is 6th, in the overall in 2005–06.

== World Cup podiums ==
Date	Season	Location	Rank	Event
30 September 2005	2005–06	Hangzhou	2nd place, silver medalist(s)	1500m
3 February 2008	2005–06	Hangzhou	1st place, gold medalist(s)	3000m Relay
