= 1999 World Short Track Speed Skating Championships =

The 1999 World Short Track Speed Skating Championships took place between March 19 and 21, 1999 in Sofia, Bulgaria. The World Championships are organised by the ISU which also run world cups and championships in speed skating and figure skating.

== Results ==
=== Men ===
Event	Gold		Silver		Bronze	
Overall*	Li Jiajun; China	81 Points	Satoru Terao; Japan	76 Points	Fabio Carta; Italy	60 Points
500 m	Li Jiajun; China	42.565	Apolo Anton Ohno; United States	42.679	Fabio Carta; Italy	43.072
1000 m	Satoru Terao; Japan	1:30.913	Kim Dong-sung; South Korea	1:31.242	Andrew Quinn; Canada	1:31.935
1500 m	Fabio Carta; Italy	2:27.533	Satoru Terao; Japan	2:27.673	Li Jiajun; China	2:27.883
3000 m	Li Jiajun; China	5:11.544	Satoru Terao; Japan	5:11.663	Fabio Carta; Italy	5:11.673
5000 m relay	China	7:07.395	South Korea	7:09.725	Canada	7:13.806

* First place is awarded 34 points, second is awarded 21 points, third is awarded 13 points, fourth is awarded 8 points, fifth is awarded 5 points, sixth is awarded 3 points, seventh is awarded 2 points, and eighth is awarded 1 point in the finals of each individual race to determine the overall world champion. The relays do not count for the overall classification.

=== Women ===
Event	Gold		Silver		Bronze	
Overall*	Yang Yang (A); China	123 points	Yang Yang (S); China	81 points	Kim Moon-jung; South Korea	47 points
500 m	Yang Yang (A); China	44.640	Evgenia Radanova; Bulgaria	44.789	Yang Yang (S); China	44.889
1000 m	Yang Yang (A); China	1:37.440	Yang Yang (S); China	1:37.547	Kim Moon-jung; South Korea	1:37.675
1500 m	Yang Yang (S); China	2:34.645	Yang Yang (A); China	2:34.825	Kim Moon-jung; South Korea	2:34.997
3000 m	Yang Yang (A); China	5:48.541	Kim Moon-jung; South Korea	5:48.573	Yang Yang (S); China	5:49.381
3000 m relay	China	4:23.725	Italy	4:25.131	Bulgaria	4:25.930

* First place is awarded 34 points, second is awarded 21 points, third is awarded 13 points, fourth is awarded 8 points, fifth is awarded 5 points, sixth is awarded 3 points, seventh is awarded 2 points, and eighth is awarded 1 point in the finals of each individual race to determine the overall world champion. The relays do not count for the overall classification.

== Medal table ==
Rank	Nation	Gold	Silver	Bronze	Total
1	China (CHN)	10	3	3	16
2	Japan (JPN)	1	3	0	4
3	Italy (ITA)	1	1	3	5
4	South Korea (KOR)	0	3	3	6
5	Bulgaria (BUL)	0	1	1	2
6	United States (USA)	0	1	0	1
7	Canada (CAN)	0	0	2	2
Totals (7 entries)		12	12	12	36
