= Pieter Gysel =

Belgian short track speed skater

Medal record

Men's short track speed skating

Representing Belgium

European Championships
Silver medal – second place	2002 Grenoble	5000 m relay
Silver medal – second place	2003 Saint Petersburg	500 m
Bronze medal – third place	2004 Zoetermeer	1500 m
Silver medal – second place	2006 Krynica-Zdrój	500 m
Silver medal – second place	2006 Krynica-Zdrój	1500 m
Bronze medal – third place	2006 Krynica-Zdrój	Overall
Silver medal – second place	2007 Sheffield	Overall

Pieter Gysel (born 18 December 1980 in Leuven, Flemish Brabant, Belgium) is a Belgian short track speed skater.
