= Nataliya Dmitriyeva =

Russian speed skater

Personal information
- Nationality: Russian
- Born: 23 November 1977 (age 48) Smolensk, Russia

Sport
- Sport: Short track speed skating
Medal record
European Championships
Silver medal – second place	2003 Saint Petersburg	3000 m relay
Bronze medal – third place	2001 The Hague	3000 m relay

Nataliya Vladimirovna Dmitriyeva (Russian: Наталья Владимировна Дмитриева; born 23 November 1977) is a Russian short track speed skater. She competed in three events at the 2002 Winter Olympics.
