= Annita van Doorn =

Dutch speed skater (born 1983)

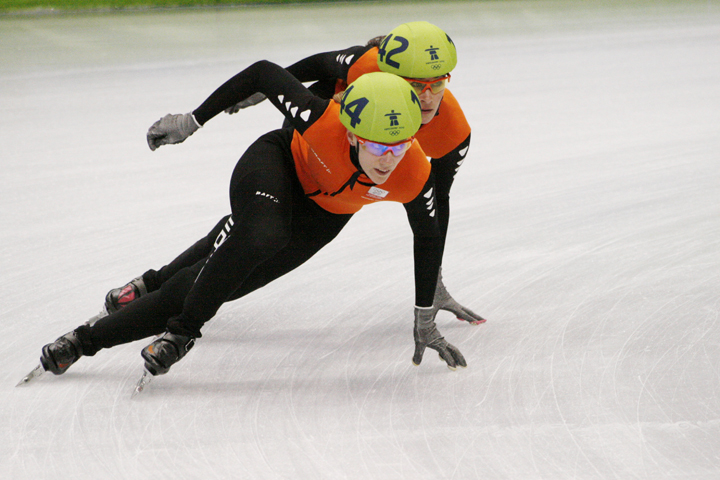
- Annita van Doorn

Personal information
- Born: April 26, 1983 (age 43) Utrecht, Netherlands
- Height: 168 cm (5 ft 6 in)
- Weight: 57 kg (126 lb)

Sport
- Country: Netherlands
- Sport: Speed skating
- Club: Schaats Vereniging Utrecht (SVU)
- Coached by: Jeroen Otter
Medal record
Women's short track speed skating
Representing the Netherlands
World Championships
Silver medal – second place	2011 Sheffield	3000 m relay
European Championships
Gold medal – first place	2008 Ventspils	500 m
Gold medal – first place	2011 Heerenveen	3000 m relay
Bronze medal – third place	2007 Sheffield	3000 m relay
Bronze medal – third place	2009 Torino	3000 m relay
Bronze medal – third place	2010 Dresden	3000 m relay
World Cup
Bronze medal – third place	2010 Changchun	3000 m relay

Annita van Doorn (born 26 April 1983) is a Dutch Short track speed skater. She made her international debut in 2003 at the World Championships for teams. Van Doorn was the first Dutch short track speed skater with a victory on a World Cup distance. She took a lap on her competitors on the 3000 meters and won the super final, surprisingly, at her second World Cup competition. In 2008, she became European Champion in the 500 meters in Ventspils, Latvia. In the overall classification she ended as 5th. She won bronze medals at the European Championships with the relay team in 2007, 2009 en 2010. In 2009 Van Doorn won her first Dutch title.

At the Olympic Games in Vancouver, Van Doorn ended as fourth on the relay with her team, together with teammates Liesbeth Mau Asam, Jorien ter Mors, Sanne van Kerkhof and Maaike Vos. Van Doorn ended as 11th at the 1000 meters. She was close for qualifying for the 2006 Olympics in Torino, but did not make it.

The 2010–2011 season was successful for Van Doorn and the relay team. During the European Championships in their own country (Thialf, Heerenveen) the Dutch (Jorien ter Mors, Sanne van Kerkhof, Yara van Kerkhof and Annita van Doorn) grabbed the European title. Two months later the team surprised at the Worldchampionships. Behind China, the Dutch team took the silver. Earlier in the season the team won bronze at a World Cup competition in Changchun, China. It was the first medal in 8 years for the Netherlands in a World Cup competition.

Van Doorn won the award for the best short track speed skater of the Netherlands twice (2008, 2009).

== Personal records ==
distance	time	date	icerink	country	extra
500 meters	44,247	12–11–09	Marquette	United States	
1000 meters	1.31,516*	24–02–10	Vancouver	Canada	
1500 meters	2.23,893	20–10–07	Harbin	China	
3000 meters	5.08,597	22–03–09	Zoetermeer	Netherlands	
3000 meters relay	4.13,135*	15–11–09	Marquette	United States	Annita van Doorn, Sanne van Kerkhof, Liesbeth Mau Asam, Jorien ter Mors

*: Dutch national record
