= Olga Danilov =

Israeli speed skater

Olga Danilov אולגה דנילוב
Personal information
- Born: November 27, 1973 (age 52) Kharkiv, Ukraine
- Spouses: Aleksandr Danilov, Israeli Olympian shooter

Sport
- Country: Israel
- Sport: Short track speed skating

Olga Danilov (Hebrew: אולגה דנילוב; born November 27, 1973) is an Israeli short track speed skater.

== Personal life ==
She was born in Kharkiv, Ukraine. Danilov moved to Israel in 1994, following her sister. She is married to Olympian shooter Aleksandr Danilov, and has a daughter, Nicole. She has lived in Metulla, Israel.

== Speed skating career ==
Competing for Israel at the 2002 Winter Olympics in Salt Lake City, in short track speed skating women's 1,500 metres Danilov came in 14th, competing in 500 metres she came in 16th, and competing in 1,000 metres she came in 21st.
