= Anna Krasteva =

Bulgarian speed skater

Personal information
- Nationality: Bulgarian
- Born: 17 May 1977 (age 49) Ihtiman, Bulgaria

Sport
- Sport: Short track speed skating
Medal record
Women's short track speed skating
Representing Bulgaria
World Championships
Bronze medal – third place	1999 Sofia	3000 m relay
Bronze medal – third place	2001 Jeonju	3000 m relay
Bronze medal – third place	2003 Warsaw	3000 m relay

Anna Krasteva (born 17 May 1977) is a Bulgarian former short track speed skater. She competed in two events at the 2002 Winter Olympics. Krasteva has won three bronze medals in 3000 metre relay at the 1999, 2001, and 2003 World Championships, respectively.
