= Paula Bzura =

Polish speed skater

Personal information
- Born: September 4, 1990 (age 35) Białystok, Poland
- Height: 5 ft 6 in (168 cm)
- Weight: 134 lb (61 kg)

Sport
- Country: Poland
- Sport: Short track speed skating

Achievements and titles
- Highest world ranking: 23 (1500m)

Paula Bzura (born September 4, 1990 in Białystok) is a Polish short-track speed-skater.

Bzura competed at the 2010 Winter Olympics for Poland. She was disqualified in the first round of the 1500 metres, failing to advance. In the 500 metres, she finished second in the opening round, advancing to the quarterfinals, where she finished fourth, not advancing further and finishing 14th overall.

As of 2013, Bzura's best finish at the World Championships is 14th, in the 1500 metres in 2010. She also has one bronze medal as a member of the Polish relay team at the 2013 European Championships

As of 2013, Bzura has not finished on the podium on the ISU Short Track Speed Skating World Cup. Her top World Cup ranking is 23rd, in the 1500 metres in 2010–11.
