= Nicky Gooch =

British speed skater

Medal record

Men's Short Track Speed Skating

Representing Great Britain

Olympic Games
Bronze medal – third place	1994 Lillehammer	500 m

World Championships
Silver medal – second place	1996 The Hague	1500 m
Silver medal – second place	1992 Denver	5000m Relay
Bronze medal – third place	1991 Sydney	5000m Relay

European Championships
Gold medal – first place	1997 Malmö	5000 m relay
Gold medal – first place	1998 Budapest	5000 m relay
Gold medal – first place	2000 Bormio	1500m
Silver medal – second place	2000 Bormio	1500m
Silver medal – second place	2000 Bormio	Overall
Silver medal – second place	2000 Bormio	5000 m relay
Silver medal – second place	2001 The Hague	1500m
Silver medal – second place	2001 The Hague	3000m
Silver medal – second place	2001 The Hague	5000 m relay
Bronze medal – third place	1997 Malmö	500
Bronze medal – third place	1999 Oberstdorf	5000 m relay
Bronze medal – third place	2001 The Hague	Overall

Nicholas "Nicky" John Gooch (born 30 January 1973) is a British short track speed skater who competed in the 1992 Winter Olympics, 1994 Winter Olympics, 1998 Winter Olympics and 2002 Winter Olympics.

Gooch was born in Roehampton, south-west London, United Kingdom. In 1992 he was a member of the British relay team which finished sixth in the 5000 metre relay competition.

== Olympic Games ==
Two years later he won the bronze medal in the 500 metres contest and finished seventh in the 1000 metres competition at the Lillehammer Olympics.

At the 1998 Games he finished seventh with the British team in the 5000 metre relay event. In the 1000 metres contest he finished 22nd and in the 500 metres competition he finished 29th.

His final Olympic appearance was in 2002 when he finished 17th in the 1500 metres event and 27th in the 1000 metres contest.

== Coaching ==
Gooch coaches the Great Britain short track speed skating team. He coaches Elise Christie, Jack Whelbourne, Jon Eley and Charlotte Gilmartin.
