= Rózsa Darázs =

Hungarian speed skater

Personal information
- Born: November 3, 1987 (age 38) Jászberény, Hungary
- Height: 5 ft 11 in (180 cm)
- Weight: 143 lb (65 kg)

Sport
- Country: Hungary
- Sport: Short track speed skating

Achievements and titles
- Highest world ranking: 16 (1000m)

Rózsa Darázs (born November 3, 1987, in Jászberény) is a Hungarian short track speed skater.

Darázs competed at the 2006 and 2010 Winter Olympics for Hungary. In 2006, she finished third in her opening round race of the 500 metres and fourth in the opening round of the 1000 and 1500 metres, failing to advance.

In 2010, she was disqualified in the first round of the 1500 metres, failing to advance. She was also a member of the Hungarian 3000 metre relay team, which finished fourth in the semifinals and second in the B Final, ending up fifth overall. Her best finish in an individual event is 20th, in the 2006 1500 metres

As of 2013, Darázs's best finish at the World Championships, is 6th, in 2009 as part of the Hungarian 3000 metre relay team. Her best individual performance at a World Championships came in 2004, when she placed 18th in the 500 metres. She has also won a gold medal as a member of the Hungarian relay team at the 2009 European Championships.

As of 2013, Darázs has one ISU Short Track Speed Skating World Cup victory, which came as a member of the Hungarian relay team at Hangzhou in 2005–06. Her top World Cup ranking is 16th, in the 1000 metres in 2005–06.

== World Cup podiums ==
| Date | Season | Location | Rank | Event |
| 3 February 2008 | 2005–06 | Hangzhou | 1st place, gold medalist(s) | 3000m Relay |
