= Christin Priebst =

German speed skater

Personal information
- Nationality: German
- Born: 18 September 1983 (age 42) Dresden, East Germany
- Height: 169 cm (5 ft 7 in)

Sport
- Sport: Short track speed skating
Medal record
Women's short track speed skating
Representing Germany
European Championships
Bronze medal – third place	2002 Grenoble	3000 m relay
Bronze medal – third place	2004 Zoetermeer	3000 m relay
Bronze medal – third place	2005 Turin	3000 m relay
Gold medal – first place	2007 Sheffield	3000 m relay
Bronze medal – third place	2008 Ventspils	3000 m relay
Silver medal – second place	2009 Turin	3000 m relay
Gold medal – first place	2010 Dresden	3000 m relay
Silver medal – second place	2011 Malmö	3000 m relay

Christin Priebst (born 18 September 1983) is a German short track speed skater. She competed at the 2002 Winter Olympics and the 2006 Winter Olympics.
