= Sarah Lindsay (speed skater) =

British speed skater

Sarah Joanne Lindsay (born 8 June 1980 in Kingston upon Thames, London, England) is a British short track speed skater who has competed at the Winter Olympic Games on three occasions.

Lindsay made her debut for the Great Britain team in 1996 and from 2000 was British Ladies Champion for nine consecutive years. She was coached by Nicky Gooch, the winner of the bronze medal in the men's 500 metres event at the 1994 Winter Olympics in Lillehammer, Norway.

Lindsay first appeared at the Winter Olympics in the 2002 Games held in Salt Lake City, Utah. She competed in the women's 500, 1000 and 1500 metres short track speed skating events. She was eliminated in the heats of the 1500 metres and made the quarterfinals of her other two events, achieving a best finish of tenth in the 500 metres competition.

At the 2006 Winter Olympics in Turin, Italy, Lindsay again competed in the 500, 1000 and 1500 metres. She made the semifinals and finished eighth overall in the 500 metres. In the 1000 metres, she failed to make it past the first round after finishing third in her heat and was also eliminated in the first round of the 1500 metres; her final positions in the standings were sixteenth in the 1000 metres and fifteenth in the 1500 metres. In 2007, she suffered a ruptured spinal disc after crashing into the boards around the ice rink where she had been training. The accident caused her to miss fifteen months of competition.

Her third appearance at the Olympics came at the 2010 Games in Vancouver, British Columbia, Canada. Lindsay participated in a single event, the 500 metres. She advanced from her first round heat by finishing second but was disqualified in the quarterfinals after a crash with Canada's Jessica Gregg and finished in sixteenth position overall.

In 2010, Lindsay was part of the British women's team at the World Team Championships in Bormio. The team, which also included Alex Whelbourne, Elise Christie and Charlotte Gilmartin, finished fourth in the opening group stage and did not advance in the tournament.

Sarah Lindsay is now the owner of personal training company ROAR Fitness, operating in London and Dubai.

Sarah appeared on the British TV game show Pointless Celebrities alongside Chemmy Alcott on 13 January 2024 in Series 16, Episode 10

Lindsay is also an Athlete Ambassador for Right to Play, the world's leading sport for development charity.
