= Tatiana Borodulina =

Australian speed skater

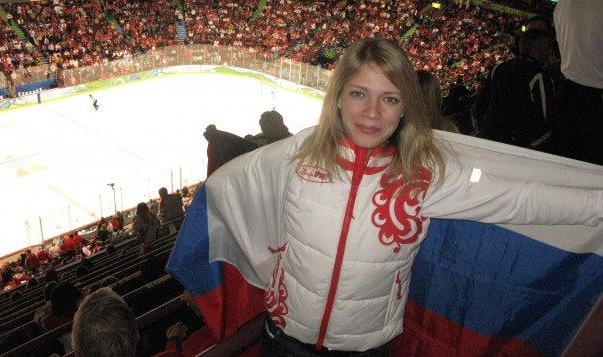
- Borodulina at the 2010 Vancouver Games

Personal information
- Born: 22 December 1984 (age 41) Omsk, Russian SFSR, Soviet Union
- Height: 1.56 m (5 ft 1 in)
- Weight: 52 kg (115 lb)

Sport
- Country: Russia
- Sport: Speed skating
- World Cup wins: 2005 3rd 1000m 2003 2nd 500m
Medal record
Women's short track speed skating
Representing Russia
European Championships
Gold medal – first place	2004 Zoetermeer	3000 m relay
Gold medal – first place	2005 Turin	Overall
Gold medal – first place	2005 Turin	500 m
Gold medal – first place	2005 Turin	3000 m relay
Gold medal – first place	2018 Dresden	3000 m relay
Silver medal – second place	2003 Saint Petersburg	500 m
Silver medal – second place	2003 Saint Petersburg	3000 m relay
Silver medal – second place	2004 Zoetermeer	Overall
Silver medal – second place	2004 Zoetermeer	1000 m
Silver medal – second place	2004 Zoetermeer	1500 m
Silver medal – second place	2005 Turin	1000 m
Silver medal – second place	2014 Dresden	500 m
Silver medal – second place	2016 Sochi	3000 m relay
Bronze medal – third place	2001 Dresden	3000 m relay
Bronze medal – third place	2006 Krynica-Zdrój	500 m
Bronze medal – third place	2014 Dresden	1000 m
- Updated on 25 February 2010

Tatiana Aleksandrovna Borodulina (Russian: Татьяна Александровна Бородулина; born 22 December 1984) is a Russian-Australian short-track speed skater.

== Career ==
Borodulina competed for Russia at the 2006 Winter Olympics in Turin, Italy. She was a finalist in the 1500m, but was disqualified.

=== Move to Australia ===
Borodulina moved to Australia in 2006, having received a ban from Russian short track for being absent for a doping test. She resided in Sunnybank Hills, Queensland. She won two gold medals and a bronze medal in the 2009 Short Track Speed Skating World Cup season. Legislation had to be passed to amend the Australian Citizenship Act so that Borodulina would receive citizenship in time to compete at the 2010 Winter Olympic Games in Vancouver, British Columbia, Canada after missing the cut-off mark by 18 days. Australian Immigration Minister Chris Evans said this amendment benefited a number of athletes who had moved to Australia. She even joined the Australian Army Reserve on April 18, 2009, in an effort to fast-track her Australian citizenship. But she left Australia after the 2010 Olympics.

=== 2010 Winter Olympics ===
At Vancouver 2010 Winter Olympic Games, Borodulina competed for adopted country of Australia. She came 11th in the Women's Short Track Speed Skating 1500m finals. She has qualified for the quarter-finals for the 1000 m. Borodulina failed to qualify for the 500 m event, with a final ranking of 21st.

=== 2014 Winter Olympics ===
Borodulina officially admitted to the Italian news her commitment to compete once again for her native country Russia.
