= Mara Zini =

Italian speed skater

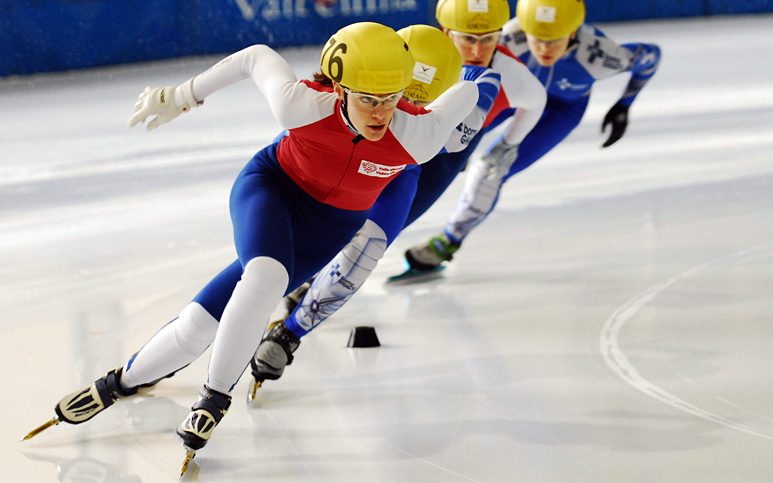

Medal record

Women's short track speed skating

Representing Italy

Olympic Games
| Bronze medal – third place | 2006 Turin | 3000m relay |

World Championships
| Bronze medal – third place | 2004 Gothenburg | 3000 m relay |
| Bronze medal – third place | 2006 Minneapolis | 3000 m relay |

World Team Championships
| Bronze medal – third place | 2003 Sofia | Team |
| Bronze medal – third place | 2004 Saint Petersburg | Team |

European Championships
| Gold medal – first place | 1997 Malmö | 3000 m relay |
| Gold medal – first place | 1998 Budapest | 3000 m relay |
| Silver medal – second place | 2000 Bormio | 3000 m relay |
| Silver medal – second place | 2001 The Hague | 500 m |
| Bronze medal – third place | 2001 The Hague | 1000 m |
| Silver medal – second place | 2001 The Hague | 1500 m |
| Silver medal – second place | 2001 The Hague | Overall |
| Silver medal – second place | 2002 Grenoble | 500 m |
| Bronze medal – third place | 2002 Grenoble | 1500 m |
| Gold medal – first place | 2002 Grenoble | 3000 m relay |
| Bronze medal – third place | 2002 Grenoble | Overall |
| Gold medal – first place | 2003 Saint Petersburg | 3000 m relay |
| Silver medal – second place | 2004 Zoetermeer | 3000 m relay |
| Gold medal – first place | 2006 Krynica-Zdrój | 3000 m relay |
| Silver medal – second place | 2007 Sheffield | 3000 m relay |

Mara Zini (born 26 October 1979 in Sondalo) is an Italian short track speed skater who won a bronze medal in the 3000m relay at the 2006 Winter Olympics. She is a cousin of Katia Zini who was on the same medal winning relay team.
