= Michele Antonioli =

Italian short track speed skater

Medal record

Men's Short Track Speed Skating

Representing Italy

Olympic Games
Silver medal – second place	2002 Salt Lake City	5000 m relay

World Championships
Gold medal – first place	1996 The Hague	5000 m relay
Bronze medal – third place	1997 Nagano	5000 m relay
Bronze medal – third place	2000 Sheffield	5000 m relay
Bronze medal – third place	2004 Gothenburg	5000 m relay

World Team Championships
Bronze medal – third place	1996 Lake Placid	Team
Bronze medal – third place	1997 Seoul	Team
Bronze medal – third place	1998 Bormio	Team
Bronze medal – third place	2000 The Hague	Team

European Championships
Gold medal – first place	2002 Grenoble	5000 m Relay
Silver medal – second place	1998 Budapest	Overall
Silver medal – second place	2003 St. Petersburg	Overall
Bronze medal – third place	1999 Oberstdorf	Overall

Michele Antonioli (born 31 January 1977 in Bormio) is an Italian short track speed skater who competed in the 1998 Winter Olympics and in the 2002 Winter Olympics.

In 1998, he was a member of the Italian relay team which finished fourth in the 5000 metre relay competition. In the 1000 metre event, he finished 30th.

Four years later, he won the silver medal in the 5000 metre relay contest.
