= Kateřina Novotná =

Czech speed skater

Personal information
- Born: 12 August 1984 (age 41) Mladá Boleslav, Czechoslovakia
- Height: 5 ft 4 in (163 cm)
- Weight: 123 lb (56 kg)

Sport
- Country: Czech Republic
- Sport: Short track speed skating Long track speed skating

Achievements and titles
- Highest world ranking: 4 (1500m)
Medal record
Women's short track speed skating
Representing Czech Republic
European Championships
Gold medal – first place	2010 Dresden	Overall
Silver medal – second place	2009 Turin	Overall

Kateřina Novotná (born 12 August 1984) is a Czech short-track speed-skater and long track speed skater.

== Long track speed skating ==
As a long track speed skater she was, who was active between 1995 and 2016.

As a junior she became national champion in 1997 (allround) and in 2005 (500 metres). At the elite level she won the bronze medal at the 2009 Czech Allround Championships. She represented her nation at the 2011 European Speed Skating Championships, finishing 19th overall. She also competed at other international competitions, including at ISU Speed Skating World Cups.

=== Personal records ===
Personal records
Women's speed skating
Event	Result	Date	Location	Notes
500 m	41,09	18.11.2015	Salt Lake City	
1000 m	1.19,41	21.11.2010	Calgary	
1500 m	2.01,50	17.10.2015	Salt Lake City	
3000 m	4.19,88	03.10.2015	Salt Lake City	

== Short track speed skating ==
Novotná competed at the 2002, 2006 and 2010 Winter Olympics for the Czech Republic. In 2002, she finished fourth in her opening round race of both the 500 metres and the 1000 metres, failing to advance. In the 1500 metres she finished third in her first race, and advanced to the semifinals, where she finished fifth, failing to advance further.

In 2006, she finished third in her opening round race of the 1000 metres, failing to advance. In the 1500 metres she finished third in the opening round, and advanced to the semifinals, where she finished fifth, failing to advance. In the 500 metres she finished second in her opening round heat, won her quarterfinal, then placed fourth in her semifinal to advance to the B Final. She placed 3rd in the B Final, and 6th overall, her best Olympic result.

In 2010, she finished fourth in the first round of the 1000 metres, failing to advance. In the 1500 metres, she finished third in the opening heat, advancing to the quarterfinals, where she was disqualified. In the 500 metres, she finished second in her opening round heat, then third in her quarterfinal, failing to advance to the semifinals.

As of 2013, Novotná's best finish at the World Championships is 5th, in the 500 metres in 2009, when she came 11th in the 500 metres. She also won a gold medal as a member of the Czech relay team at the 2010 European Championships.

As of 2013, Novotná has one ISU Short Track Speed Skating World Cup podium finish, a bronze in the 1500 metres in 2006–07 at Changchun. Her top World Cup ranking is 4th, in the 1500 metres in 2006–07.

== World Cup podiums ==
Date	Season	Location	Rank	Event
22 October 2006	2006–07	Changchun	3rd place, bronze medalist(s)	1500m
