= Kornél Szántó =

Hungarian speed skater

Personal information
- Nationality: Hungarian
- Born: 26 May 1978 (age 46); Szombathely, Hungary

Sport
- Sport: Short track speed skating

Kornél Szántó (born 26 May 1978) is a Hungarian short track speed skater. He competed in two events at the 2002 Winter Olympics on track of 1000m and 1500m.
