= Kimberly Derrick =

Short-track speed skater

Personal information
- Born: April 28, 1985 (age 41) Blytheville, Arkansas, U.S.
- Height: 5 ft 4 in (163 cm)

Sport
- Country: United States
- Sport: Short track speed skating
Medal record
Women's short track speed skating
Representing the United States
Olympic Games
| Bronze medal – third place | 2010 Vancouver | 3000 m relay |
World Championships
| Bronze medal – third place | 2010 Sofia | 3000 m relay |
World Team Championships
| Bronze medal – third place | 2009 Heerenveen | Team |

Kimberly Derrick (born April 28, 1985 in Blytheville, Arkansas) is an American short track speed skater.

== Biography ==
Kimberly Derrick grew up on inline skates and, between the ages of 6 and 18, she dominated the women's inline world, winning and placing in numerous National Championships. At 18, Derrick switched to ice and took on the speedskating world with the same ferocity she did with inline competitions.

As a member of the 2006 U.S. Olympic Team in Torino, Italy, Derrick realized her dream of making an Olympic team, and in September 2009, she earned a spot on the 2010 U.S. Olympic Team.

During World Cup competition in the 2008-09 season, Derrick earned three medals in the 1000m, including a gold. She was also part of the ladies relay team that won the gold medal in Dresden, Germany - the first time the U.S. ladies have won gold in this event. During the ISU World Short Track Team Championships in the Netherlands, Derrick was part of the ladies team, earning a bronze medal overall.

Derrick is an instrumental part of the ladies relay team which won a silver medal at World Cup 3 in Montreal.

Derrick is a converted inline skater and the first U.S. Winter Olympian born in Arkansas. She has lived in Arkansas, Tennessee, Ohio, Michigan and Utah. At Northern Michigan University, she majored in elementary education, and she would like to go into teaching one day. Derrick graduated from Northern Michigan University with a degree in elementary education.

== Career ==
=== 2006 Winter Olympics ===
At the 2006 Winter Olympics, Derrick competed in the 1000 meters (in which she was eliminated in the quarterfinals) and the 3000 meter relay (in which her team finished fourth). Derrick became the first U.S. Winter Olympian born in Arkansas. Derrick's grandfather died while in Turin to see her compete. Derrick decided to compete because she believed her grandfather would want her to do so.

=== 2010 Winter Olympics ===
Derrick didn't make it past the heats in the 1000 and 1500 m races. However, Derrick won a bronze medal in the 3000 m relay (she only competed in the semifinals).
