= Aika Klein =

German short track speed skater

Personal information
- Born: November 26, 1982 (age 43) Rostock, East Germany
- Height: 5 ft 7 in (1.70 m)
- Weight: 139 lb (63 kg)

Sport
- Country: Germany
- Sport: Short track speed skating

Achievements and titles
- Highest world ranking: 5 (500m)

Aika Klein (born November 26, 1982 in Rostock) is a German short track speed skater.

Klein competed at the 2002, 2006 and 2010 Winter Olympics for Germany. In 2002, she was a member of the German 3000 metre relay team, which finished fourth in the semifinals and the B Final, ending up 8th overall. In 2006, she finished third in her opening round race of the 500 metres, was disqualified in the 1000 metres and fifth in the first race of the 1500 metres, failing to advance in any of the events. She was also part of the 3000 metre relay team, which finished fourth in the semifinal and third in the B Final to place 6th overall.

In 2010, she placed fourth in her round one race of the 500 metres and was disqualified in the first round of the 1500 metres, failing to advance. In the 1000 metres, she finished third in the opening heat, but was advanced to the quarterfinals, where she finished fourth and did not advance. Her best overall individual finish, is 16th, in the 2010 1000 metres.

As of 2013, Klein's best performance at the World Championships came in 2004, when she finished 5th as a member of the German 3000m relay team. Her best individual performance at a World Championships was in 2009, when she came 17th in the 1000 metres. She also won a gold medal as a member of the German relay team at the 2010 European Championships.

As of 2013, Klein has three ISU Short Track Speed Skating World Cup podium finishes, all as part of the German relay team. Her best finishes are a pair of silver medals, in 2004–05 at Madison, and at The Hague in 2005–06. Her top World Cup ranking is 13th, in the 1500 metres in 2004–05.

== World Cup podiums ==
Date	Season	Location	Rank	Event
16 February 2003	2002–03	Saguenay	3rd place, bronze medalist(s)	3000m Relay
28 November 2004	2004–05	Madison	2nd place, silver medalist(s)	3000m Relay
28 November 2004	2005–06	The Hague	2nd place, silver medalist(s)	3000m Relay
