= Marta Capurso =

Italian short-track speed skater

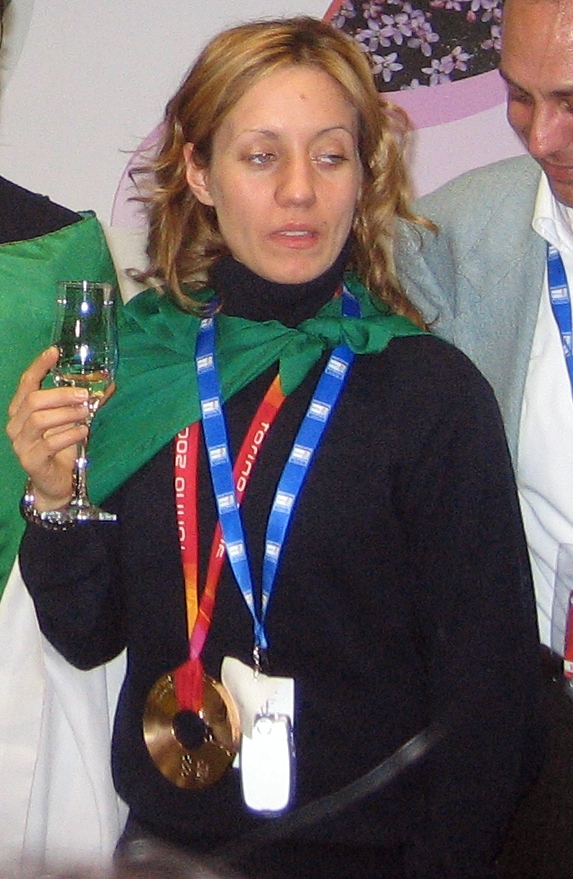

Medal record

Women's short track speed skating

Representing Italy

Olympic Games
Bronze medal – third place	2006 Turin	3000 m relay

World Championships
Bronze medal – third place	2004 Gothenburg	3000 m
Bronze medal – third place	2004 Gothenburg	3000 m relay
Bronze medal – third place	2006 Minneapolis	3000 m relay

World Team Championships
Bronze medal – third place	2003 Sofia	Team
Bronze medal – third place	2004 Saint Petersburg	Team

European Championships
Gold medal – first place	1999 Oberstdorf	3000 m relay
Bronze medal – third place	2002 Grenoble	500 m
Gold medal – first place	2002 Grenoble	3000 m relay
Silver medal – second place	2003 Saint Petersburg	1000 m
Gold medal – first place	2003 Saint Petersburg	3000 m relay
Bronze medal – third place	2004 Zoetermeer	1500 m
Silver medal – second place	2004 Zoetermeer	3000 m relay
Bronze medal – third place	2004 Zoetermeer	Overall
Silver medal – second place	2005 Turin	500 m
Silver medal – second place	2005 Turin	1500 m
Bronze medal – third place	2005 Turin	Overall
Bronze medal – third place	2006 Krynica-Zdrój	1000 m
Silver medal – second place	2006 Krynica-Zdrój	1500 m
Gold medal – first place	2006 Krynica-Zdrój	3000 m relay
Silver medal – second place	2007 Sheffield	3000 m relay

Marta Capurso (born 18 August 1980 in Turin) is an Italian short track speed skater who won bronze in the 3000m relay at the 2006 Winter Olympics.
