= Yvonne Kunze =

German speed skater (born 1978)

Personal information
- Nationality: German
- Born: 5 January 1978 (age 48) Radebeul, East Germany
- Height: 155 cm (5 ft 1 in)

Sport
- Sport: Short track speed skating
Medal record
Women's short track speed skating
Representing Germany
European Championships
Bronze medal – third place	1998 Budapest	3000 m relay
Bronze medal – third place	2000 Bormio	1000 m
Bronze medal – third place	2002 Grenoble	3000 m relay
Bronze medal – third place	2004 Zoetermeer	3000 m relay
Bronze medal – third place	2005 Turin	3000 m relay

Yvonne Kunze (born 5 January 1978 in Radebeul) is a German short track speed skater. She competed at the 1998 Winter Olympics, the 2002 Winter Olympics and the 2006 Winter Olympics.
