= Myrtille Gollin =

French speed skater (born 1984)

Personal information
- Nationality: French
- Born: 8 July 1984 (age 40); Saint-Martin-d'Hères, France

Sport
- Sport: Short track speed skating

Myrtille Gollin (born 8 July 1984) is a French short track speed skater. She competed in two events at the 2006 Winter Olympics.
