= Yuliya Pavlovich-Yelsakova =

Belarusian speed skater

Personal information
- Nationality: Belarusian
- Born: 13 December 1978 (age 46); Vitebsk, Byelorussian SSR, Soviet Union

Sport
- Sport: Short track speed skating

Yuliya Pavlovich-Yelsakova (born 13 December 1978) is a Belarusian short track speed skater. She competed at the 2002 Winter Olympics and the 2006 Winter Olympics.
