= Thomas Bauer (speed skater) =

German speed skater

Personal information
- Nationality: German
- Born: 23 April 1984 (age 40); Munich, Germany

Sport
- Sport: Short track speed skating

Thomas Bauer (born 23 April 1984) is a German short track speed skater. He competed in the men's 5000 metre relay event at the 2006 Winter Olympics.
