= European Short Track Speed Skating Championships =

The European Short Track Speed Skating Championships are a European short track speed skating event held once a year.

== Medal winners ==
=== Men's ===
==== Overall classification ====
Year	Location	Gold	Silver	Bronze
1997	(Sweden) Malmö	(Italy) Fabio Carta	(Italy) Mirko Vuillermin	(France) Bruno Loscos
1998	(Hungary) Budapest	(Italy) Fabio Carta	(Italy) Michele Antonioli (Netherlands) Dave Versteeg	
1999	(Germany) Oberstdorf	(Italy) Fabio Carta	(Italy) Nicola Franceschina	(Italy) Michele Antonioli
2000	(Italy) Bormio	(Italy) Fabio Carta	(United Kingdom) Nicky Gooch	(Italy) Nicola Franceschina
2001	(Netherlands) The Hague	(France) Bruno Loscos	(Netherlands) Cees Juffermans	(United Kingdom) Nicky Gooch
2002	(France) Grenoble	(Italy) Fabio Carta	(Italy) Nicola Rodigari	(France) Bruno Loscos
2003	(Russia) Saint Petersburg	(Italy) Fabio Carta	(Italy) Michele Antonioli	(Italy) Nicola Franceschina
2004	(Netherlands) Zoetermeer	(Italy) Nicola Rodigari	(Italy) Fabio Carta	(Italy) Nicola Franceschina
2005	(Italy) Turin	(Italy) Fabio Carta	(Germany) Arian Nachbar	(Italy) Nicola Franceschina
2006	(Poland) Krynica-Zdrój	(Italy) Nicola Rodigari	(Italy) Fabio Carta	(Belgium) Pieter Gysel
2007	(United Kingdom) Sheffield	(Italy) Nicola Rodigari	(Belgium) Pieter Gysel	(Italy) Yuri Confortola
2008	(Latvia) Ventspils	(Latvia) Haralds Silovs	(Netherlands) Niels Kerstholt	(Italy) Nicola Rodigari
2009	(Italy) Turin	(Italy) Nicola Rodigari	(Latvia) Haralds Silovs	(Hungary) Viktor Knoch
2010	(Germany) Dresden	(Italy) Nicola Rodigari	(France) Thibaut Fauconnet	(France) Maxime Chataignier
2011^{1}	(Netherlands) Heerenveen	(Latvia) Haralds Silovs	(Netherlands) Sjinkie Knegt	(Russia) Ruslan Zakharov
2012^{2}	(Czech Republic) Mladá Boleslav	(Netherlands) Sjinkie Knegt	(Netherlands) Niels Kerstholt	(Russia) Semion Elistratov
2013	(Sweden) Malmö	(Netherlands) Freek van der Wart	(Netherlands) Sjinkie Knegt	(Russia) Vladimir Grigorev
2014	(Germany) Dresden	(Russia) Viktor An	(Russia) Semion Elistratov	(Netherlands) Niels Kerstholt
2015	(Netherlands) Dordrecht	(Netherlands) Sjinkie Knegt	(Russia) Viktor An	(Russia) Semion Elistratov
2016	(Russia) Sochi	(Russia) Semion Elistratov	(Hungary) Shaolin Sándor Liu	(France) Vincent Jeanne
2017	(Italy) Turin	(Russia) Semion Elistratov	(Hungary) Shaolin Sándor Liu	(Netherlands) Sjinkie Knegt
2018	(Germany) Dresden	(Netherlands) Sjinkie Knegt	(Israel) Vladislav Bykanov	(Russia) Semion Elistratov
2019	(Netherlands) Dordrecht	(Hungary) Shaolin Sándor Liu	(Hungary) Shaoang Liu	(Russia) Semion Elistratov
2020	(Hungary) Debrecen	(Hungary) Shaoang Liu	(Hungary) Shaolin Sándor Liu	(Russia) Semion Elistratov
2021	(Poland) Gdańsk	(Russia) Semion Elistratov	(Italy) Pietro Sighel	(Netherlands) Itzhak de Laat
2022	(Germany) Dresden	Event cancelled due to the COVID-19 pandemic		
2023	(Poland) Gdańsk	No overall classification		
2024	(Poland) Gdansk	No overall classification		

^{1} Thibaut Fauconnet of France was originally ranked first overall but was disqualified for failing drug tests.
^{2} Thibaut Fauconnet was originally ranked third overall but was disqualified for failing drug tests.

==== 500 metres ====
Year	Location	Gold	Silver	Bronze
2022	(Germany) Dresden	Event cancelled due to the COVID-19 pandemic		
2023	(Poland) Gdańsk	(Italy) Pietro Sighel	(Netherlands) Jens van 't Wout	(Latvia) Reinis Bērziņš
2024	(Poland) Gdańsk	(Italy) Pietro Sighel	(Netherlands) Teun Boer	(Belgium) Stijn Desmet
2025	(Germany) Dresden	(Netherlands) Jens van 't Wout	(Italy) Pietro Sighel	(France) Quentin Fercoq
2026	(Netherlands) Tilburg	(Netherlands) Jens van 't Wout	(Netherlands) Teun Boer	(Netherlands) Melle van 't Wout

==== 1000 metres ====
Year	Location	Gold	Silver	Bronze
2022	(Germany) Dresden	Event cancelled due to the COVID-19 pandemic		
2023	(Poland) Gdańsk	(Belgium) Stijn Desmet	(Netherlands) Jens van 't Wout	(Turkey) Furkan Akar
2024	(Poland) Gdańsk	(Italy) Pietro Sighel	(United Kingdom) Niall Treacy	(Belgium) Stijn Desmet
2025	(Germany) Dresden	(Italy) Pietro Sighel	(Netherlands) Jens van 't Wout	(Italy) Luca Spechenhauser
2026	(Netherlands) Tilburg	(Netherlands) Jens van 't Wout	(Italy) Luca Spechenhauser	(Italy) Thomas Nadalini

==== 1500 metres ====
Year	Location	Gold	Silver	Bronze
2022	(Germany) Dresden	Event cancelled due to the COVID-19 pandemic		
2023	(Poland) Gdańsk	(Netherlands) Jens van 't Wout	(Belgium) Stijn Desmet	(Netherlands) Friso Emons
2024	(Poland) Gdańsk	(Italy) Pietro Sighel	(Netherlands) Friso Emons	(Netherlands) Itzhak de Laat
2025	(Germany) Dresden	(Netherlands) Jens van 't Wout	(Belgium) Stijn Desmet (Netherlands) Sven Roes	Not awarded
2026	(Netherlands) Tilburg	(Netherlands) Jens van 't Wout	(Latvia) Roberts Krūzbergs	(Italy) Thomas Nadalini

==== 5000 metres relay ====
Year	Location	Gold	Silver	Bronze
2022	(Germany) Dresden	Event cancelled due to the COVID-19 pandemic		
2023	(Poland) Gdańsk	Netherlands Itzhak de Laat; Friso Emons; Jens van 't Wout; Melle van 't Wout	Italy Mattia Antonioli; Tommaso Dotti; Thomas Nadalini; Pietro Sighel; Luca Spechenhauser	Poland Paweł Adamski; Łukasz Kuczyński; Michał Niewiński; Diané Sellier
2024	(Poland) Gdańsk	Netherlands Teun Boer; Itzhak de Laat; Friso Emons; Kay Huisman	Belgium Stijn Desmet; Adriaan Dewagtere; Ward Pétré; Warre Van Damme; Enzo Proost	Poland Łukasz Kuczyński; Michał Niewiński; Félix Pigeon; Diané Sellier
2025	(Germany) Dresden	Italy Thomas Nadalini; Lorenzo Previtali; Pietro Sighel; Luca Spechenhauser; Mattia Antonioli	Poland Łukasz Kuczyński; Michał Niewiński; Diané Sellier; Neithan Thomas; Paweł Adamski	Belgium Stijn Desmet; Warre Noiron; Ward Pétré; Warre Van Damme
2026	(Netherlands) Tilburg	Italy Andrea Cassinelli; Thomas Nadalini; Pietro Sighel; Luca Spechenhauser; Lorenzo Previtali	Netherlands Teun Boer; Itzhak de Laat; Friso Emons; Jens van 't Wout; Melle van 't Wout	Poland Łukasz Kuczyński; Michał Niewiński; Félix Pigeon; Diané Sellier; Neithan Thomas

=== Women's ===
Year	Location	Gold	Silver	Bronze
1997	(Sweden) Malmö	(Italy) Marinella Canclini	(Netherlands) Ellen Wiegers	(Russia) Yelena Tikhanina
1998	(Hungary) Budapest	(Italy) Marinella Canclini	(Netherlands) Anke Jannie Landman (Netherlands) Ellen Wiegers	
1999	(Germany) Oberstdorf	(Italy) Marinella Canclini	(Bulgaria) Evgenia Radanova	(Netherlands) Maureen de Lange
2000	(Italy) Bormio	(Bulgaria) Evgenia Radanova	(Italy) Katia Zini	(Italy) Evelina Rodigari
2001	(Netherlands) The Hague	(Bulgaria) Evgenia Radanova	(Italy) Mara Zini	(France) Stéphanie Bouvier
2002	(France) Grenoble	(Bulgaria) Evgenia Radanova	(Italy) Mara Zini	(United Kingdom) Jo Williams
2003	(Russia) Saint Petersburg	(Bulgaria) Evgenia Radanova	(France) Stéphanie Bouvier	(Russia) Nina Yevteyeva
2004	(Netherlands) Zoetermeer	(Bulgaria) Evgenia Radanova	(Russia) Tatiana Borodulina	(Italy) Marta Capurso
2005	(Italy) Turin	(Russia) Tatiana Borodulina	(Bulgaria) Evgenia Radanova	(Italy) Marta Capurso
2006	(Poland) Krynica-Zdrój	(Bulgaria) Evgenia Radanova	(Italy) Arianna Fontana	(Italy) Katia Zini
2007	(United Kingdom) Sheffield	(Bulgaria) Evgenia Radanova	(France) Stéphanie Bouvier	(Italy) Katia Zini
2008	(Latvia) Ventspils	(Italy) Arianna Fontana	(Bulgaria) Evgenia Radanova	(Russia) Nina Yevteyeva
2009	(Italy) Turin	(Italy) Arianna Fontana	(Czech Republic) Kateřina Novotná	(France) Stéphanie Bouvier
2010	(Germany) Dresden	(Czech Republic) Kateřina Novotná	(Italy) Arianna Fontana	(United Kingdom) Elise Christie
2011	(Netherlands) Heerenveen	(Italy) Arianna Fontana	(Hungary) Bernadett Heidum	(Italy) Martina Valcepina
2012	(Czech Republic) Mladá Boleslav	(Italy) Arianna Fontana	(Netherlands) Jorien ter Mors	(Italy) Martina Valcepina
2013	(Sweden) Malmö	(Italy) Arianna Fontana	(United Kingdom) Elise Christie	(Netherlands) Jorien ter Mors
2014	(Germany) Dresden	(Netherlands) Jorien ter Mors	(United Kingdom) Elise Christie	(Italy) Arianna Fontana
2015	(Netherlands) Dordrecht	(United Kingdom) Elise Christie	(Russia) Sofia Prosvirnova	(Poland) Patrycja Maliszewska
2016	(Russia) Sochi	(United Kingdom) Elise Christie	(United Kingdom) Charlotte Gilmartin	(Netherlands) Suzanne Schulting
2017	(Italy) Turin	(Italy) Arianna Fontana	(Russia) Sofia Prosvirnova	(Russia) Ekaterina Konstantinova
2018	(Germany) Dresden	(Italy) Arianna Fontana	(Italy) Martina Valcepina	(Russia) Sofia Prosvirnova
2019	(Netherlands) Dordrecht	(Netherlands) Suzanne Schulting	(Russia) Sofia Prosvirnova	(United Kingdom) Elise Christie
2020	(Hungary) Debrecen	(Netherlands) Suzanne Schulting	(Italy) Arianna Fontana	(Italy) Martina Valcepina
2021	(Poland) Gdańsk	(Netherlands) Suzanne Schulting	(Germany) Anna Seidel	(Russia) Sofia Prosvirnova
2022	(Germany) Dresden	Event cancelled due to the COVID-19 pandemic		
2023	(Poland) Gdańsk	No overall classification		
2024	(Poland) Gdansk	No overall classification		

=== Mixed ===
==== 2000 metres relay ====
Year	Location	Gold	Silver	Bronze
2023	(Poland) Gdańsk	Netherlands Itzhak de Laat; Suzanne Schulting; Jens van 't Wout; Xandra Velzeboer; Selma Poutsma; Melle van 't Wout	Belgium Tineke den Dulk; Hanne Desmet; Stijn Desmet; Ward Pétré; Alexandra Danneel; Adriaan Dewagtere	Italy Thomas Nadalini; Arianna Sighel; Pietro Sighel; Arianna Valcepina; Elisa Confortola; Luca Spechenhauser
2024	(Poland) Gdańsk	Netherlands Teun Boer; Kay Huisman; Selma Poutsma; Xandra Velzeboer; Yara van Kerkhof	Poland Nikola Mazur; Michał Niewiński; Diané Sellier; Kamila Stormowska; Łukasz Kuczyński; Gabriela Topolska	Belgium Tineke den Dulk; Hanne Desmet; Stijn Desmet; Adriaan Dewagtere; Ward Pétré
2025	(Germany) Dresden	France Étienne Bastier; Quentin Fercoq; Aurélie Lévêque; Cloé Ollivier; Gwendoline Daudet; Tawan Thomas	Netherlands Teun Boer; Zoë Deltrap; Jens van 't Wout; Michelle Velzeboer; Sjinkie Knegt; Diede van Oorschot	Poland Natalia Maliszewska; Michał Niewiński; Diané Sellier; Kamila Stormowska; Łukasz Kuczyński; Nikola Mazur
2026	(Netherlands) Tilburg	Netherlands Teun Boer; Jens van 't Wout; Michelle Velzeboer; Xandra Velzeboer; Selma Poutsma; Melle van 't Wout	Poland Natalia Maliszewska; Michał Niewiński; Félix Pigeon; Gabriela Topolska; Kamila Sellier; Diané Sellier	Hungary Moon Won-jun; Bence Nógrádi; Maja Somodi; Diána Laura Végi; Dániel Tiborcz

== Medal count ==
=== Overall classification (1997-2021) ===
Rank	Nation	Gold	Silver	Bronze	Total
1	Italy	22	15	16	53
2	Netherlands	8	10	6	24
3	Bulgaria	7	3	0	10
4	Russia	5	6	13	24
5	Hungary	2	5	1	8
6	Great Britain	2	4	4	10
7	Latvia	2	1	0	3
8	France	1	3	6	10
9	Poland	1	0	1	2
10	Germany	0	2	0	2
11	Belgium	0	1	1	2
12	Czech Republic	0	1	0	1
12	Israel	0	1	0	1
Totals (13 entries)		50	52	48	150

== See also ==
- Short track speed skating
