= Katia Zini =

Italian short track skater

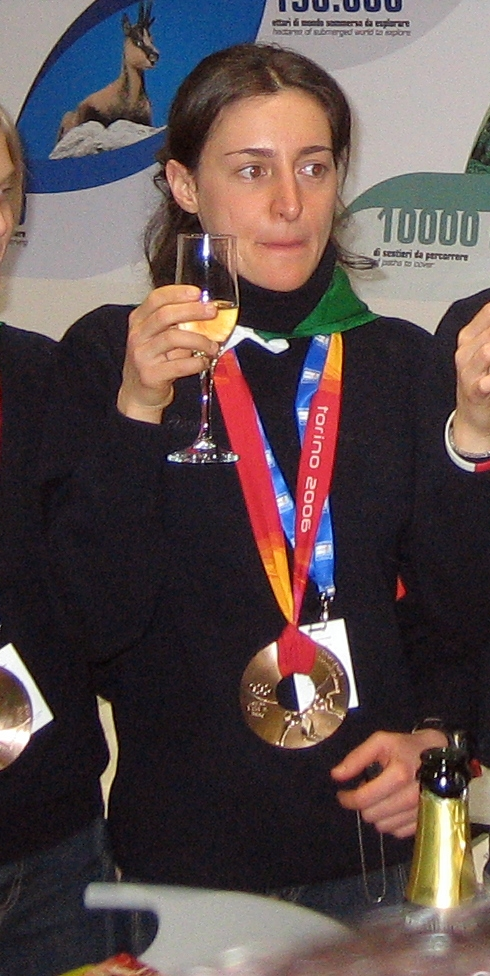

Medal record

Women's short track speed skating

Representing Italy

Olympic Games
| Bronze medal – third place | 2006 Turin | 3000 m relay |

World Championships
| Bronze medal – third place | 2004 Gothenburg | 3000 m relay |
| Bronze medal – third place | 2006 Minneapolis | 3000 m relay |

World Team Championships
| Bronze medal – third place | 2003 Sofia | Team |
| Bronze medal – third place | 2004 Saint Petersburg | Team |

European Championships
| Bronze medal – third place | 2002 Grenoble | 1000 m |
| Gold medal – first place | 2002 Grenoble | 3000 m relay |
| Gold medal – first place | 2003 Saint Petersburg | 3000 m relay |
| Silver medal – second place | 2004 Zoetermeer | 500 m |
| Silver medal – second place | 2004 Zoetermeer | 3000 m relay |
| Gold medal – first place | 2006 Krynica-Zdrój | 3000 m relay |
| Bronze medal – third place | 2006 Krynica-Zdrój | Overall |
| Silver medal – second place | 2007 Sheffield | 1500 m |
| Silver medal – second place | 2007 Sheffield | 3000 m relay |
| Bronze medal – third place | 2007 Sheffield | Overall |

Katia Zini (born 23 June 1981 in Sondalo) is an Italian short track speed skater who won bronze in the 3000m relay at the 2006 Winter Olympics. She also skated in the 2002 Winter Olympics and the 2010 Winter Olympics. She is a cousin of speed skater Mara Zini who was on the same medal winning relay.
