= Katalin Kristó =

Romanian speed skater

Katalin Kristó (born 1 December 1983 in Miercurea Ciuc) is a Romanian short track speed skater of Hungarian ethnicity, who competed at three Winter Olympics in 2002, 2006 and 2010. She achieved her best results in 1,500 meters by finishing 17th and 18th in 2002 and 2006, respectively.

== Personal records ==
As of 28 December 2011

Distance	Time	Date set	Place	Event
500 meters	45.734	9 November 2007	Bormio, Italy	Alta Valtellina Trophy
1000 meters	1:32.987	26 October 2008	Vancouver, Canada	Samsung ISU World Cup
1500 meters	2:24.642	25 October 2008	Vancouver, Canada	Samsung ISU World Cup
3000 meters	5:24.299	19 December 2004	Spišská Nová Ves, Slovakia	Maple Cup
