= Cees Juffermans =

Dutch short track speed skater

Cees Juffermans (born 10 February 1982) is a former Olympian and Dutch short track speed skater. However, in his recent career he is more well known as a marathon speed skater.

Juffermans is one of the most renowned short track speed skaters the Netherlands has ever produced. At the 2001 European Championships, he won the silver medal and competed in the 2002 Winter Olympics in Salt Lake City where he was eliminated in the series at the 500 and 1000 meters. At the 1500 meters, he would reach the semi-finals and would eventually finish in 8th place.

His road to the 2006 Winter Olympics in Turin was not the easiest. Juffermans was nominated by the Dutch Speed Skating Association for both the 1000 and 1500 metres and only had to show he was in form prior to the Olympics at the Speed Skating World Cup meeting in The Hague. He was unable to do so and his 1000 meters ticket was given to Niels Kerstholt instead, who did meet the qualifications to reach the Olympics. On 20 January 2006, he eventually did qualify for the Olympics as during the 2006 European Championships he finished in 6th position at the 1500 meters, which was good enough to qualify. As the Dutch had another starting entry left which was not taken by any other skater he was also allowed to start at the 500 meters in Turin. At the 500 meters, he reached the quarter-finals, while at the 1500 meters he was eliminated in the semi-finals, although he had the final in reach. With only one lap to go Juffermans was in second position when Belgian Pieter Gysel hit him and both fell on the ice. Gysel was disqualified and as a result Juffermans would be able to ride in the final, however, after his fall, he did not pass the finish line, and was eliminated after all. After the Olympics, he would make a surprising switch by giving up on short track speed skating, and starting to participate in marathon speed skating instead.

== Personal life ==
Born 10 February 1982 in Stompwijk, Netherlands. Currently he is in a relationship with short track speed skater, Liesbeth Mau Asam.
