= Bruno Loscos =

French speed skater (born 1975)

Personal information
- Nationality: French
- Born: 28 April 1975 (age 50); Lyon, France

Sport
- Sport: Short track speed skating

Bruno Loscos (born 28 April 1975) is a French short track speed skater. He competed at the 1994 Winter Olympics, the 1998 Winter Olympics and the 2002 Winter Olympics.
