= Jo Williams (speed skater) =

British short-track speed skater

Personal information
- Full name: Joanna Frances Williams
- Nationality: British
- Born: 1 December 1981 (age 43); Isleworth, England
- Height: 171 cm (5 ft 7 in)
- Weight: 64 kg (141 lb)

Sport
- Sport: Short-track speed skating

Joanna Frances "Jo" Williams (born 1 December 1981) is a British short-track speed skater. She competed at the 2002 Winter Olympics and the 2006 Winter Olympics.
