= Liesbeth Mau Asam =

Dutch speed skater

Liesbeth Mau Asam (born 9 April 1982 in The Hague) is a Dutch Short track speed skater who lives in Woubrugge and who has a relationship with Cees Juffermans.

Mau Asam participated at the 2006 Winter Olympics in Turin, but had a hard time qualifying for the Games. She was nominated by the Dutch Speed Skating Association on the 500 metres and had to show form at the Speed Skating World Cup meeting in her city of birth The Hague. She did not succeed in reaching the goals set by the Dutch Olympic Committee and did not qualify directly. She had to wait until the European Championships in January 2006, where she finished in 5th position over 500 metres, which was good enough for her to qualify for the Olympics. As the Dutch had two more starting entries left (at 1000 and 1500 metres) which were not taken by any other skater Mau Asam was also allowed to participate at those distances in Turin.

Eventually she would set her worst performance at the distance she qualified at, the 500 metres as she was eliminated in the series. At the 1000 metres she was able to reach the quarter-finals, while at the 1500 metres she reached the semi-finals. A few weeks after the Olympics she would become Dutch National Champion for the third time in her career and successfully defended the title a year later.
