= Nicola Franceschina =

Italian short track speed skater

Medal record

Men's Short Track Speed Skating

Representing Italy

Olympic Games
Silver medal – second place	2002 Salt Lake City	5000 m relay

World Championships
Bronze medal – third place	1997 Nagano	5000 m relay
Bronze medal – third place	2000 Sheffield	5000 m relay
Bronze medal – third place	2004 Gothenburg	5000 m relay

World Team Championships
Bronze medal – third place	1996 Lake Placid	Team
Bronze medal – third place	1997 Seoul	Team
Bronze medal – third place	1998 Bormio	Team
Bronze medal – third place	2000 The Hague	Team

European Championships
Silver medal – second place	1999 Oberstdorf	Overall
Bronze medal – third place	2000 Bormio	Overall
Bronze medal – third place	2003 St. Petersburg	Overall
Bronze medal – third place	2004 Zoetermeer	Overall
Bronze medal – third place	2005 Turin	Overall

Nicola Franceschina (born 26 May 1977) is an Italian short track speed skater who competed in the 1998 Winter Olympics, in the 2002 Winter Olympics, and in the 2006 Winter Olympics.

He was born in Bormio.

In 1998 he was a member of the Italian relay team which finished fourth in the 5000 metre relay competition.

Four years later he won the silver medal in the 5000 metre relay contest. In the 500 metre event he finished twelfth.

At the 2006 Games he was part of the Italian team which finished fourth in the 5000 metre relay contest.
