= Nina Yevteyeva =

Russian speed skater (born 1982)

Nina Aleksandrovna Yevteyeva (Russian: Нина Александровна Евтеева, born 24 November 1982 in Omsk) is a Russian short track speed skater. She competed at the 2002 Winter Olympics and 2010 Winter Olympics.
