= Stéphanie Bouvier =

French speed skater (born 1981)

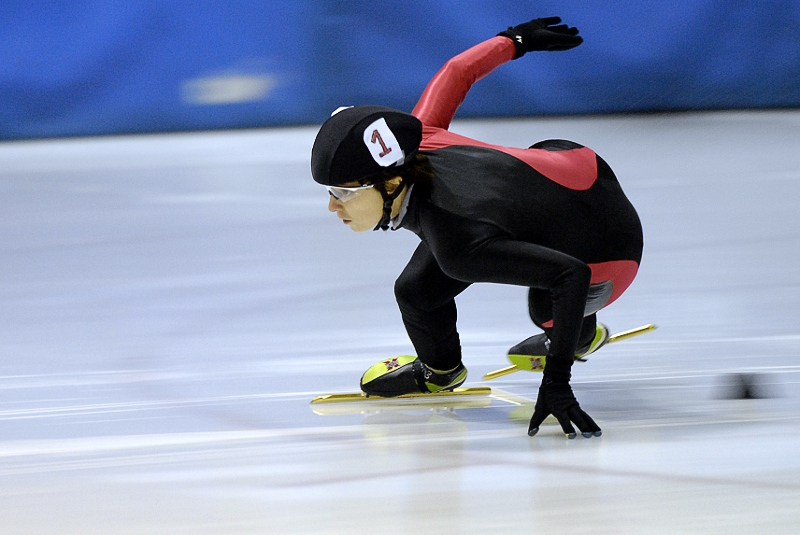

Medal record

Women's short track speed skating

Representing France

World Championships
| Bronze medal – third place | 2005 Beijing | 3000 m relay |

Stéphanie Bouvier (born 15 November 1981) is a short track speed-skater. She represented France at the 2006 Winter Olympics and France at the 2010 Winter Olympics.
