= Evgenia Radanova =

Short track speed skater

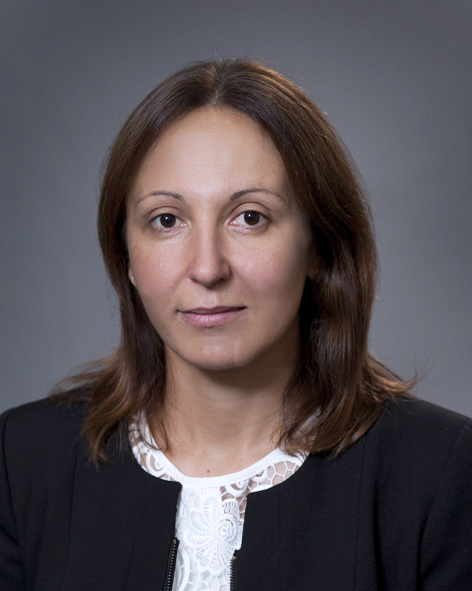

Personal information
- Full name: Evgenia Radanova
- Born: 4 November 1977 (age 48) Sofia, Bulgaria
- Height: 170 cm (5 ft 7 in)
- Weight: 65 kg (143 lb)

Sport
- Sport: Short track speed skating Cycling
Medal record
Women's short track speed skating
Representing Bulgaria
Olympic Games
Silver medal – second place	2002 Salt Lake City	500 meters
Silver medal – second place	2006 Turin	500 meters
Bronze medal – third place	2002 Salt Lake City	1500 meters
World Championships
Gold medal – first place	2000 Sheffield	500 m
Gold medal – first place	2003 Warsaw	1000 m
Silver medal – second place	1999 Sofia	500 m
Silver medal – second place	2001 Jeonju	1500 m
Silver medal – second place	2002 Montréal	500 m
Silver medal – second place	2002 Montréal	3000 m
Bronze medal – third place	1995 Gjovik	3000 m
Bronze medal – third place	1998 Vienna	1500 m
Bronze medal – third place	1998 Vienna	3000 m
Bronze medal – third place	1999 Sofia	3000 m relay
Bronze medal – third place	2001 Jeonju	Overall
Bronze medal – third place	2001 Jeonju	3000 m
Bronze medal – third place	2001 Jeonju	3000 m relay
Bronze medal – third place	2002 Montréal	Overall
Bronze medal – third place	2002 Montréal	1000 m
Bronze medal – third place	2003 Warsaw	3000 m relay

Evgenia Radanova (Bulgarian: Евгения Раданова; born 4 November 1977) is a Bulgarian female short track speed skater and racing cyclist who has participated in both the Summer and Winter Olympics. She was the world record holder in the 500 m short track distance with 43.671s, which she set in Calgary, Canada on 19 October 2001. In the Salt Lake City 2002 Winter Olympic games she won a silver medal at the same distance and a bronze at 1500m. In Athens 2004 Summer games she took part in cycling, but did not get a medal. In the 2010 Vancouver Olympics in the women's 500 m she ended up 7th.

Radanova currently trains in Italy, although most of her career she spent with Slavia Sofia Sports Club and the National Sports Academy in Sofia, Bulgaria. In the Academy she studied coaching. She weighs 65 kg and is 170 cm tall. Radanova has been severely injured at least twice, but has overcome the injuries to come back. In August 2014, Radanova was appointed as Bulgarian Minister of Youth and Sports on a temporary basis as part of the caretaker government of Georgi Bliznashki.
