= Short-track speed skating at the 2002 Winter Olympics – Men's 1500 metres =

Men's 1500 metres at the XIX Olympic Winter Games
- Pictogram for short track
- Venue: Salt Lake Ice Center
- Dates: 20 February 2002
- Competitors: 31 from 19 nations
- Winning time: 2:18.541

Medalists
1st place, gold medalist(s)		Apolo Anton Ohno	United States
2nd place, silver medalist(s)		Li Jiajun	China
3rd place, bronze medalist(s)		Marc Gagnon	Canada

The men's 1500 metres in short track speed skating at the 2002 Winter Olympics took place on 20 February at the Salt Lake Ice Center.

== Records ==
Prior to this competition, the existing world and Olympic records were as follows:

World record	Apolo Anton Ohno (USA)	2:13.728	Kearns, United States	15 December 2001
Olympic record	None	None	None	None

The following new Olympic records were set during this competition.

Date	Round	Team	Time	OR	WR
20 February	Heat 5	Guo Wei (CHN)	2:18.846	OR	
20 February	Semifinal 1	Kim Dong-sung (KOR)	2:15.942	OR	

== Results ==
=== Heats ===
The first round was held on 20 February. There were six heats of five skaters each, with the top three finishers moving on to the semifinals.

Heat 1

Rank	Athlete	Country	Time	Notes
1	Ahn Hyun-soo	South Korea	2:23.287	Q
2	Bruno Loscos	France	2:23.517	Q
3	Satoru Terao	Japan	2:23.680	Q
4	Pieter Gysel	Belgium	2:24.161	
5	Volodymyr Hryhor'iev	Ukraine	2:25.316	

Heat 2

Rank	Athlete	Country	Time	Notes
1	Fabio Carta	Italy	2:26.644	Q
2	Apolo Anton Ohno	United States	2:26.809	Q
3	Nicky Gooch	Great Britain	2:27.084	Q
4	Kornél Szántó	Hungary	2:27.467	
5	Mark McNee	Australia	2:27.840	

Heat 3

Rank	Athlete	Country	Time	Notes
1	Rusty Smith	United States	2:25.179	Q
2	Li Jiajun	China	2:25.347	Q
3	Martin Johansson	Sweden	2:25.824	Q
4	Leon Flack	Great Britain	2:25.832	
5	Kiril Pandov	Bulgaria	2:27.730	

Heat 4

Rank	Athlete	Country	Time	Notes
1	Kim Dong-sung	South Korea	2:22.133	Q
2	André Hartwig	Germany	2:22.541	Q
3	Steven Bradbury	Australia	2:22.632	Q
4	Mark Jackson	New Zealand	2:22.906	
5	Krystian Zdrojkowski	Poland	2:23.015	

Heat 5

Rank	Athlete	Country	Time	Notes
1	Guo Wei	China	2:18.846	Q
2	Nicola Rodigari	Italy	2:19.067	Q
3	Miroslav Boyadzhiev	Bulgaria	2:22.082	Q
4	Balázs Knoch	Hungary	2:40.617	
5	Naoya Tamura	Japan	3:06.585	

Heat 6

Rank	Athlete	Country	Time	Notes
1	Marc Gagnon	Canada	2:20.126	Q
2	Cees Juffermans	Netherlands	2:20.397	Q
3	Gregory Durand	France	2:20.496	Q
4	Matúš Užák	Slovakia	2:22.557	
–	Simon Van Vossel	Belgium	DQ	

=== Semifinals ===
The semifinals were held on 20 February. The top two finishers in each of the three semifinals qualified for the A final, while the third and fourth place skaters advanced to the B Final.

Semifinal 1

Rank	Athlete	Country	Time	Notes
1	Kim Dong-sung	South Korea	2:15.942	QA
2	Bruno Loscos	France	2:15.981	QA
3	Rusty Smith	United States	2:16.906	QB
4	Miroslav Boyadzhiev	Bulgaria	2:23.468	QB
5	Nicola Rodigari	Italy	2:53.907	
–	Satoru Terao	Japan	DQ	

Semifinal 2

Rank	Athlete	Country	Time	Notes
1	Fabio Carta	Italy	2:25.072	QA
2	Apolo Anton Ohno	United States	2:25.152	QA
3	Guo Wei	China	2:25.321	QB
4	Steven Bradbury	Australia	2:25.457	QB
5	Nicky Gooch	Great Britain	2:25.903	
6	André Hartwig	Germany	2:25.936	

Semifinal 3

Rank	Athlete	Country	Time	Notes
1	Li Jiajun	China	2:19.877	QA
2	Marc Gagnon	Canada	2:20.050	QA
3	Cees Juffermans	Netherlands	2:21.726	QB
4	Martin Johansson	Sweden	2:24.032	QB
5	Gregory Durand	France	2:49.994	
–	Ahn Hyun-soo	South Korea	DQ	

=== Finals ===
The six qualifying skaters competed in Final A, while six others raced in Final B.

Final A

Rank	Athlete	Country	Time	Notes
1st place, gold medalist(s)	Apolo Anton Ohno	United States	2:18.541	
2nd place, silver medalist(s)	Li Jiajun	China	2:18.731	
3rd place, bronze medalist(s)	Marc Gagnon	Canada	2:18.806	
4	Fabio Carta	Italy	2:18.947	
5	Bruno Loscos	France	2:19.587	
–	Kim Dong-sung	South Korea	DQ	

Final B

Rank	Athlete	Country	Time	Notes
6	Rusty Smith	United States	2:27.155	
7	Guo Wei	China	2:27.376	
8	Cees Juffermans	Netherlands	2:27.611	
9	Martin Johansson	Sweden	2:28.559	
10	Steven Bradbury	Australia	2:28.604	
11	Miroslav Boyadzhiev	Bulgaria	2:29.307	

== Controversy ==
In the final race A, with one lap remaining and currently in second place, Apolo Ohno of the United States attempted to make a pass on the leader Kim Dong-Sung of South Korea, who then drifted to the inside and as a result, Ohno raised his arms to imply he was blocked. Kim finished first ahead of Ohno, but the Australian referee James Hewish disqualified Kim for what appeared to be impeding, awarding the gold medal to Ohno. Fourth-place finisher of the race, Fabio Carta of Italy, showed his disagreement with the disqualification decision saying it was "absurd that the Korean was disqualified". China's Li Jiajun, who moved from bronze to silver, remained neutral saying: "I respect the decision of the referee, I'm not going to say any more". Australian Steven Bradbury, the 1000 m gold-medal winner, also shared his views: "Whether Dong-Sung moved across enough to be called for cross-tracking, I don't know, he obviously moved across a bit. It's the judge's interpretation. A lot of people will say it was right and a lot of people will say it's wrong. I've seen moves like that before that were not called. But I've seen them called too".

The South Korean team immediately protested the decision of the chief official of the race, but their protests were denied by the International Skating Union (ISU). The South Korean team then appealed to the International Olympic Committee (IOC) and the Court of Arbitration for Sport (CAS). The IOC refused to see the case, stating, "This is a matter for the ISU to decide on. At this time, the IOC has received no proposal and taken no action". The CAS sided with the officials of the race as "there is no provision in the short-track rule book for overturning a judgment call by the referee" after the South Korean team asked to have a video replay be used to determine whether or not there was a rule violation.

The disqualification of Kim upset South Korean supporters, many of whom directed their anger at Ohno and the IOC. A large number of e-mails protesting the race results crashed the IOC's email server, and thousands of accusatory letters, many of which contained death threats, were sent to Ohno and the IOC. South Korean media accused Ohno of simulating foul, using the Konglish word "Hollywood action". Ohno shared his thoughts on the Koreans' hostile reaction by saying, "I was really bothered by it. I grew up around many Asian cultures, Korean one of them. A lot of my best friends were Korean growing up. I just didn't understand. Later on I realized that was built up by certain people and that was directed at me, negative energy from other things, not even resulting around the sport, but around politics, using me to stand on the pedestal as the anti-American sentiment". Earlier the same year, President George Bush had named North Korea as one of three members of the Axis of Evil, which had upset some South Koreans; directing their anger at Ohno was a less direct way of voicing anger against Bush's decision. The controversy continued at the 2002 FIFA World Cup, held jointly in South Korea and Japan several months after the Olympics. When the South Korean soccer team scored a goal during the group stage match against the U.S. team, South Korean players Ahn Jung-Hwan and Lee Chun-Soo made an exaggerated move imitating the move Ohno had made during the speed skating event to imply the other athlete had drifted into his lane.
