= Short-track speed skating at the 2002 Winter Olympics – Men's 1000 metres =

Men's 1000 metres at the XIX Olympic Winter Games
- Pictogram for short track
- Venue: Salt Lake Ice Center
- Dates: 13–16 February 2002
- Competitors: 32 from 20 nations
- Winning time: 1:29.109

Medalists
1st place, gold medalist(s)		Steven Bradbury	Australia
2nd place, silver medalist(s)		Apolo Anton Ohno	United States
3rd place, bronze medalist(s)		Mathieu Turcotte	Canada

The men's 1000 metres in short track speed skating at the 2002 Winter Olympics took place from 13 to 16 February at the Salt Lake Ice Center. This event is remembered for the victory of Australian Steven Bradbury, who benefited from all four other skaters in the final going down ahead of him, while Bradbury stayed on his feet and won gold. It was the first ever Winter Olympics gold medal for Australia.

== Records ==
Prior to this competition, the existing world and Olympic records were as follows:

World record	Steve Robillard (CAN)	1:25.985	Calgary, Canada	14 October 2001
Olympic record	Satoru Terao (JPN)	1:29.398	Nagano, Japan	17 February 1998

The following new Olympic records were set during this competition.

Date	Round	Team	Time	OR	WR
13 February	Heat 7	Rusty Smith (USA)	1:28.183	OR	
16 February	Quarterfinal 3	Mathieu Turcotte (CAN)	1:27.185	OR	

== Results ==
=== Heats ===
The first round was held on 13 February. There were eight heats of four skaters each, with the top two finishers moving on to the quarterfinals.

Heat 1

Rank	Athlete	Country	Time	Notes
1	Wim De Deyne	Belgium	1:30.950	Q
2	Satoru Terao	Japan	1:31.025	Q
3	Mark Jackson	New Zealand	1:32.276	
4	Miroslav Boyadzhiev	Bulgaria	1:32.421	

Heat 2

Rank	Athlete	Country	Time	Notes
1	Steven Bradbury	Australia	1:30.956	Q
2	Nicola Rodigari	Italy	1:30.991	Q
3	Balázs Knoch	Hungary	1:31.061	
4	Pieter Gysel	Belgium	1:31.290	

Heat 3

Rank	Athlete	Country	Time	Notes
1	Feng Kai	China	1:32.554	Q
2	Mark McNee	Australia	1:39.325	Q
–	Gregory Durand	France		DQ
–	Volodymyr Hryhor'iev	Ukraine		DQ

Heat 4

Rank	Athlete	Country	Time	Notes
1	Naoya Tamura	Japan	1:28.867	Q
2	Leon Flack	Great Britain	1:29.584	Q
3	Krystian Zdrojkowski	Poland	1:30.026	
–	Martin Johansson	Sweden		DQ

Heat 5

Rank	Athlete	Country	Time	Notes
1	Fabio Carta	Italy	1:28.520	Q
2	Marc Gagnon	Canada	1:28.718	Q
3	Cees Juffermans	Netherlands	1:29.249	
4	Matúš Užák	Slovakia	2:17.608	

Heat 6

Rank	Athlete	Country	Time	Notes
1	Kim Dong-sung	South Korea	1:32.091	Q
2	Apolo Anton Ohno	United States	1:33.167	Q
3	Arian Nachbar	Germany	1:33.585	
4	Battulgyn Oktyabri	Mongolia	1:47.213	

Heat 7

Rank	Athlete	Country	Time	Notes
1	Rusty Smith	United States	1:28.183	Q OR
2	Mathieu Turcotte	Canada	1:28.229	Q
3	Bruno Loscos	France	1:28.532	
4	Kiril Pandov	Bulgaria	1:31.842	

Heat 8

Rank	Athlete	Country	Time	Notes
1	Ahn Hyun-soo	South Korea	1:30.252	Q
2	Li Jiajun	China	1:30.447	Q
3	Kornél Szántó	Hungary	1:31.391	
4	Nicky Gooch	Great Britain	1:38.034	

=== Quarterfinals ===
The quarterfinals were held on 16 February. The top two finishers in each of the four quarterfinals advanced to the semifinals. In quarterfinal 2, Canada's Marc Gagnon was disqualified and Japan's Naoya Tamura advanced.

Quarterfinal 1

Rank	Athlete	Country	Time	Notes
1	Fabio Carta	Italy	1:28.186	Q
2	Satoru Terao	Japan	1:28.241	Q
3	Feng Kai	China	1:28.424	
4	Leon Flack	Great Britain	1:28.604	

Quarterfinal 2

Rank	Athlete	Country	Time	Notes
1	Apolo Anton Ohno	United States	1:28.650	Q
2	Steven Bradbury	Australia	1:29.265	Q
3	Naoya Tamura	Japan	1:29.864	ADV
–	Marc Gagnon	Canada		DQ

Quarterfinal 3

Rank	Athlete	Country	Time	Notes
1	Mathieu Turcotte	Canada	1:27.185	Q OR
2	Ahn Hyun-soo	South Korea	1:27.201	Q
3	Nicola Rodigari	Italy	1:27.578	
4	Wim De Deyne	Belgium	1:27.785	

Quarterfinal 4

Rank	Athlete	Country	Time	Notes
1	Kim Dong-sung	South Korea	1:27.429	Q
2	Li Jiajun	China	1:27.467	Q
3	Rusty Smith	United States	1:28.078	
4	Mark McNee	Australia	1:46.701	

=== Semifinals ===
The semifinals were held on 16 February. The top two finishers in each of the two semifinals qualified for the A final, while the third and fourth place skaters advanced to the B Final. In the first semifinal, Japan's Satoru Terao was disqualified, with Canada's Mathieu Turcotte, who finished third in the race, advancing to the A final.

Semifinal 1

Rank	Athlete	Country	Time	Notes
1	Steven Bradbury	Australia	1:29.189	QA
2	Li Jiajun	China	1:30.592	QA
3	Mathieu Turcotte	Canada	1:35.156	ADV
4	Kim Dong-sung	South Korea	1:52.645	QB
–	Satoru Terao	Japan	DQ	

Semifinal 2

Rank	Athlete	Country	Time	Notes
1	Apolo Anton Ohno	United States	1:27.428	QA
2	Ahn Hyun-soo	South Korea	1:27.469	QA
3	Fabio Carta	Italy	1:27.492	QB
4	Naoya Tamura	Japan	1:27.751	QB

=== Finals ===
The five qualifying skaters competed in Final A, while three others raced for 6th place in Final B. As a result of Li Jiajun's disqualification, however, the winner of the B final finished 5th.

Final A

Rank	Athlete	Country	Time	Notes
1st place, gold medalist(s)	Steven Bradbury	Australia	1:29.109	
2nd place, silver medalist(s)	Apolo Anton Ohno	United States	1:30.160	
3rd place, bronze medalist(s)	Mathieu Turcotte	Canada	1:30.563	
4	Ahn Hyun-soo	South Korea	1:32.519	
–	Li Jiajun	China		DQ

Final B

Rank	Athlete	Country	Time	Notes
5	Kim Dong-sung	South Korea	1:35.582	
6	Fabio Carta	Italy	1:35.589	
7	Naoya Tamura	Japan	1:35.823	
