= Alpine skiing at the 2002 Winter Olympics – Men's combined =

Men's combined at the XIX Olympic Winter Games
- Pictogram for alpine skiing
- Venue: Snowbasin
- Date: February 13, 2002
- Competitors: 47 from 19 nations
- Winning time: 3:17.56

Medalists
1st place, gold medalist(s)		Kjetil André Aamodt	Norway
2nd place, silver medalist(s)		Bode Miller	United States
3rd place, bronze medalist(s)		Benjamin Raich	Austria

The combined event was held on February 13 at Snowbasin. It consisted of 3 runs, a downhill and two runs in the slalom. American Bode Miller skied from 15th place after the downhill to a silver medal, 0.28 second behind Kjetil André Aamodt, who won a record sixth Olympic medal in alpine skiing.

== Results ==
The results of the men's combined event in Alpine skiing at the 2002 Winter Olympics.

Rank	Name	Country	Downhill	Slalom 1	Slalom 2	Time	Difference
1st place, gold medalist(s)	Kjetil André Aamodt	Norway	1:38.79	46.88	51.89	3:17.56	
2nd place, silver medalist(s)	Bode Miller	United States	1:41.23	46.88	49.73	3:17.84	+0.28
3rd place, bronze medalist(s)	Benjamin Raich	Austria	1:41.05	46.30	50.91	3:18.26	+0.70
4	Rainer Schönfelder	Austria	1:41.90	45.46	51.31	3:18.67	+1.11
5	Lasse Kjus	Norway	1:38.97	47.72	53.11	3:19.80	+2.24
6	Paul Accola	Switzerland	1:39.62	48.73	53.91	3:22.26	+4.70
7	Patrick Staudacher	Italy	1:39.23	49.51	53.73	3:22.47	+4.91
8	Jean-Philippe Roy	Canada	1:43.31	46.87	52.50	3:22.68	+5.12
9	Jernej Koblar	Slovenia	1:41.70	48.42	53.35	3:23.47	+5.91
10	Stanley Hayer	Czech Republic	1:45.30	47.15	51.99	3:24.44	+6.88
11	Kilian Albrecht	Austria	1:43.32	46.13	55.50	3:24.95	+7.39
12	Borek Zakouril	Czech Republic	1:41.64	49.52	54.04	3:25.20	+7.64
13	Alessandro Fattori	Italy	1:40.15	50.30	55.12	3:25.57	+8.01
14	Andrei Filichkin	Russia	1:43.04	50.19	54.91	3:28.14	+10.58
15	Ross Green	Great Britain	1:43.30	49.97	55.84	3:29.11	+11.55
16	Stefan Georgiev	Bulgaria	1:44.25	49.63	55.51	3:29.39	+11.83
17	Darin McBeath	Canada	1:41.07	51.78	56.72	3:29.57	+12.01
18	Pavel Chestakov	Russia	1:41.45	52.24	56.19	3:30.18	+12.62
19	Jakub Fiala	United States	1:41.85	51.24	57.34	3:30.42	+12.87
20	Jan Holicky	Czech Republic	1:42.85	51.78	56.72	3:31.15	+13.59
21	Antoine Dénériaz	France	1:41.91	51.82	58.24	3:31.97	+14.41
22	Sergey Komarov	Russia	1:43.47	51.66	56.90	3:32.03	+14.47
23	Nicolas Arsel	Argentina	1:48.12	51.24	57.22	3:36.58	+19.02
24	Ivan Heimschild	Slovakia	1:44.89	52.72	59.17	3:36.78	+19.22
25	Nikolay Skriabin	Ukraine	1:44.80	55.03	1:01.23	3:41.06	+23.50
	Ondřej Bank	Czech Republic	1:42.71	48.25	DNF		
	AJ Bear	Australia	1:41.02	52.45	DSQ		
	Kurt Sulzenbacher	Italy	1:41.49	DNS			
	Maksim Kedrin	Russia	1:42.81	DNS			
	Michael Walchhofer	Austria	1:39.94	DNF			
	Didier Défago	Switzerland	1:40.04	DNF			
	Bruno Kernen	Switzerland	1:40.07	DNF			
	Gregor Sparovec	Slovenia	1:40.42	DNF			
	Gaetan Llorach	France	1:40.56	DNF			
	Ed Podivinsky	Canada	1:40.59	DNF			
	Casey Puckett	United States	1:41.80	DNF			
	Truls Ove Karlsen	Norway	1:41.85	DNF			
	Andrej Jerman	Slovenia	1:42.42	DNF			
	Alexander Heath	South Africa	1:47.27	DNF			
	Tahir Bisic	Bosnia and Herzegovina	1:48.68	DNF			
	Agustin Garcia Jurjo	Argentina	1:49.77	DNF			
	Cristian Javier Simari Birkner	Argentina	DSQ				
	Craig Branch	Australia	DSQ				
	Mitja Dragšič	Slovenia	DSQ				
	Michal Rajcan	Slovakia	DSQ				
	Paul Schwarzacher-Joyce	Ireland	DSQ				
	Angel Pumpalov	Bulgaria	DSQ				
