= Short-track speed skating at the 2002 Winter Olympics – Men's 500 metres =

Men's 500 metres at the XIX Olympic Winter Games
- Pictogram for short track
- Venue: Salt Lake Ice Center
- Dates: 23 February 2002
- Competitors: 32 from 20 nations
- Winning time: 41.802

Medalists
1st place, gold medalist(s)		Marc Gagnon	Canada
2nd place, silver medalist(s)		Jonathan Guilmette	Canada
3rd place, bronze medalist(s)		Rusty Smith	United States

The men's 500 metres in short track speed skating at the 2002 Winter Olympics took place on 23 February at the Salt Lake Ice Center.

== Records ==
Prior to this competition, the existing world and Olympic records were as follows:

World record	Jeffrey Scholten (CAN)	41.514	Calgary, Canada	13 October 2001
Olympic record	Takafumi Nishitani (JPN)	42.756	Nagano, Japan	21 February 1998

The following new Olympic records were set during this competition.

Date	Round	Team	Time	OR	WR
23 February	Heat 7	Jonathan Guilmette (CAN)	42.326	OR	
23 February	Quarterfinal 3	Kim Dong-sung (KOR)	41.806	OR	
23 February	A Final	Marc Gagnon (CAN)	41.802	OR	

== Results ==
=== Heats ===
The first round was held on 23 February. There were eight heats of four skaters each, with the top two finishers moving on to the quarterfinals.

Heat 1

Rank	Athlete	Country	Time	Notes
1	Li Jiajun	China	43.690	Q
2	Arian Nachbar	Germany	44.057	Q
3	Matúš Užák	Slovakia	44.499	
4	Asen Pandov	Bulgaria	77.124	

Heat 2

Rank	Athlete	Country	Time	Notes
1	Simon Van Vossel	Belgium	43.119	Q
2	Apolo Anton Ohno	United States	43.214	Q
3	Cees Juffermans	Netherlands	43.253	
4	Andrew McNee	Australia	44.289	

Heat 3

Rank	Athlete	Country	Time	Notes
1	Takafumi Nishitani	Japan	43.211	Q
2	Marc Gagnon	Canada	43.395	Q
3	Krisztián Szabó	Hungary	44.143	
4	Volodymyr Hryhor'iev	Ukraine	70.431	

Heat 4

Rank	Athlete	Country	Time	Notes
1	Kim Dong-sung	South Korea	42.834	Q
2	Rusty Smith	United States	42.849	Q
3	Dave Allardice	Great Britain	42.980	
4	Ganbatyn Jargalanchuluun	Mongolia	52.225	

Heat 5

Rank	Athlete	Country	Time	Notes
1	Fabio Carta	Italy	43.787	Q
2	Bruno Loscos	France	43.864	Q
3	Leon Flack	Great Britain	43.965	
4	Mark Jackson	New Zealand	44.064	

Heat 6

Rank	Athlete	Country	Time	Notes
1	Feng Kai	China	43.084	Q
2	Wim De Deyne	Belgium	43.205	Q
3	Martin Johansson	Sweden	43.435	
4	Krystian Zdrojkowski	Poland	44.117	

Heat 7

Rank	Athlete	Country	Time	Notes
1	Jonathan Guilmette	Canada	42.326	Q OR
2	Satoru Terao	Japan	42.334	Q
3	Balázs Knoch	Hungary	42.533	
4	Miroslav Boyadzhiev	Bulgaria	43.462	

Heat 8

Rank	Athlete	Country	Time	Notes
1	Nicola Franceschina	Italy	42.876	Q
2	Steven Bradbury	Australia	43.226	Q
3	Ludovic Mathieu	France	43.790	ADV
–	Lee Seung-jae	South Korea	DQ	

=== Quarterfinals ===
The top two finishers in each of the four quarterfinals advanced to the semifinals.

Quarterfinal 1

Rank	Athlete	Country	Time	Notes
1	Jonathan Guilmette	Canada	42.809	Q
2	Apolo Anton Ohno	United States	42.895	Q
3	Fabio Carta	Italy	43.113	
4	Arian Nachbar	Germany	43.626	

Quarterfinal 2

Rank	Athlete	Country	Time	Notes
1	Rusty Smith	United States	42.359	Q
2	Marc Gagnon	Canada	42.384	Q
3	Takafumi Nishitani	Japan	42.535	
–	Nicola Franceschina	Italy	DQ	

Quarterfinal 3

Rank	Athlete	Country	Time	Notes
1	Kim Dong-sung	South Korea	41.806	Q OR
2	Wim De Deyne	Belgium	41.832	Q
3	Li Jiajun	China	64.514	
4	Bruno Loscos	France	99.879	

Quarterfinal 4

Rank	Athlete	Country	Time	Notes
1	Satoru Terao	Japan	42.692	Q
2	Feng Kai	China	42.820	Q
3	Steven Bradbury	Australia	44.982	
4	Ludovic Mathieu	France	73.328	
–	Simon Van Vossel	Belgium	DQ	

=== Semifinals ===
The top two finishers in each of the two semifinals qualified for the A final, while the third and fourth place skaters advanced to the B Final. In the second semifinal, American Apolo Anton Ohno caused Japan's Satoru Terao to fall, resulting in Ohno's disqualification, while Terao was advanced to the A final.

Semifinal 1

Rank	Athlete	Country	Time	Notes
1	Rusty Smith	United States	41.916	QA
2	Marc Gagnon	Canada	41.981	QA
3	Kim Dong-sung	South Korea	41.990	QB
4	Wim De Deyne	Belgium	42.823	QB

Semifinal 2

Rank	Athlete	Country	Time	Notes
1	Jonathan Guilmette	Canada	42.201	QA
2	Feng Kai	China	42.266	QA
3	Satoru Terao	Japan	65.790	ADV
–	Apolo Anton Ohno	United States	DQ	

=== Finals ===
The five qualifying skaters competed in Final A, while two other raced for 6th place in Final B.

Final A

Rank	Athlete	Country	Time	Notes
1st place, gold medalist(s)	Marc Gagnon	Canada	41.802	
2nd place, silver medalist(s)	Jonathan Guilmette	Canada	41.994	
3rd place, bronze medalist(s)	Rusty Smith	United States	42.027	
4	Feng Kai	China	42.112	
5	Satoru Terao	Japan	42.219	

Final B

Rank	Athlete	Country	Time	Notes
6	Kim Dong-sung	South Korea	42.076	
7	Wim De Deyne	Belgium	42.961	
