= Bulgaria at the 1998 Winter Olympics =

- IOC code: BUL
- NOC: Bulgarian Olympic Committee
- Website: www.bgolympic.org (in Bulgarian and English)

in Nagano
- Competitors: 19 in 6 sports
- Flag bearer: Lyubomir Popov
- Medals Ranked 15th: Gold 1 Silver 0 Bronze 0 Total 1

Winter Olympics appearances (overview)
- 1936; 1948; 1952; 1956; 1960; 1964; 1968; 1972; 1976; 1980; 1984; 1988; 1992; 1994; 1998; 2002; 2006; 2010; 2014; 2018; 2022; 2026; 2030

Bulgaria was represented at the 1998 Winter Olympics in Nagano, Japan by the Bulgarian Olympic Committee.

In total, 19 athletes represented Bulgaria in six different sports including alpine skiing, biathlon, cross-country skiing, figure skating, short track speed skating and snowboarding.

Bulgaria only medal winner at the games was Ekaterina Dafovska who won gold in the women's individual biathlon. It was Bulgaria's first ever gold medal and their first winter Olympic medal since 1980.

== Medalists ==
In total, Bulgaria won one goal medal at the games.

Medal	Name	Sport	Event	Date
Gold	Ekaterina Dafovska	Biathlon	Women's individual	9 February

== Competitors ==
In total, 19 athletes represented Bulgaria at the 1998 Winter Olympics in Nagano, Japan across six different sports.

Sport	Men	Women	Total
Alpine skiing	4	1	5
Biathlon	1	4	5
Cross-country skiing	1	1	2
Figure skating	2	2	4
Short track speed skating	0	2	2
Snowboarding	0	1	1
Total	8	11	19

== Alpine skiing ==
Five Bulgarian athletes participated in the alpine skiing events – Petar Dichev, Stefan Georgiev, Lyubomir Popov, Angel Pumpalov and Nadejda Vassileva.

The men's combined took place on 10 and 13 February 1998. Dichev completed his first slalom run on 10 February in 51.16 seconds but was disqualified following his second run for a gate infringement.

The men's giant slalom took place on 19 February 1998. Georgiev completed his first run in one minute 27.76 seconds. Popov did not finish his first run and did not take part in the second runs. Georgiev completed his second run in one minute 23.13 seconds for a combined time of two minutes 50.89 seconds to finish 32nd overall.

The women's slalom also took place on 19 February 1998. Vassileva completed her first run in 52.68 seconds and her second run in 52.76 seconds for a combined time of one minute 45.44 seconds to finish 26th overall.

The men's slalom took place on 21 February 1998. Georgiev completed his first run in 57.95 seconds and Dichev completed his first run in 59.62 seconds. Popov and Pumpalov did not finish their first runs and did not take part in the second runs. Dichev did not finish his second run. Georgiev completed his second run in 58.17 seconds for a combined time of one minute 56.12 seconds to finish 22nd overall.

Men

Athlete	Event	Race 1	Race 2	Total	
Athlete	Event	Time	Time	Time	Rank
Lyubomir Popov	Giant Slalom	DNF	–	DNF	–
Stefan Georgiev	Giant Slalom	1:27.76	1:23.13	2:50.89	32
Angel Pumpalov	Slalom	DNF	–	DNF	–
Lyubomir Popov	Slalom	DNF	–	DNF	–
Petar Dichev	Slalom	59.62	DNF	DNF	–
Stefan Georgiev	Slalom	57.95	58.17	1:56.12	22

Men's combined

Athlete	Slalom		Downhill	Total	
Athlete	Time 1	Time 2	Time	Total time	Rank
Petar Dichev	51.16	DSQ	–	DSQ	–

Women

Athlete	Event	Race 1	Race 2	Total	
Athlete	Event	Time	Time	Time	Rank
Nadejda Vassileva	Slalom	52.68	52.76	1:45.44	26

== Biathlon ==
Five Bulgarian athletes participated in the biathlon events – Ekaterina Dafovska, Pavlina Filipova, Georgi Kasabov, Valentina Peychinova and Radka Popova.

The women's individual took place on 9 February 1998. Dafovska completed the course in 53 minutes 52 seconds but with one shooting miss for an adjusted time of 54 minutes 52 seconds to win gold. Filipova completed the course in 54 minutes 18.1 seconds but with one shooting miss for an adjusted time of 55 minutes 18.1 seconds to finish fourth overall, 0.2 seconds behind bronze.

The men's individual took place on 11 February 1998. Kasabov completed the course in one hour one minute 59.5 seconds but with five shooting misses for an adjusted time of one hour six minutes 59.5 seconds to finish 67th overall.

The women's sprint took place on 15 February 1998. Dafovska completed the course in 25 minutes 6.7 seconds with two shooting misses to finish 29th overall. Filipova completed the course in 25 minutes 34.8 seconds with three shooting misses to finish 41st overall.

The men's sprint took place on 18 February 1998. Kasabov completed the course in 31 minutes 9.5 seconds with no shooting misses to finish 57th overall.

The women's relay took place on 19 February 1998. Popova, the lead-off, completed the course in 28 minutes six seconds with no shooting misses but one extra shot. On the second leg, Dafovska completed the course in 24 minutes 56.4 seconds with no shooting misses. On the third leg, Filipova completed the course in 27 minutes 52.7 seconds but with three shooting misses and five extra shots. On the anchor leg, Peychinova completed the course in 28 minutes 0.1 seconds with no shooting misses but three extra shots. The team took a combined time of one hour 48 minutes 55.2 seconds to finish 16th overall.

Men

Event	Athlete	Misses ^{1}	Time	Rank
10 km Sprint	Georgi Kasabov	0	31:09.5	57

Event	Athlete	Time	Misses	Adjusted time ^{2}	Rank
20 km	Georgi Kasabov	1'01:59.5	5	1'06:59.5	67

Women

Event	Athlete	Misses ^{1}	Time	Rank
7.5 km Sprint	Pavlina Filipova	3	25:34.8	41
7.5 km Sprint	Ekaterina Dafovska	2	25:06.7	29

Event	Athlete	Time	Misses	Adjusted time ^{2}	Rank
15 km	Pavlina Filipova	54:18.1	1	55:18.1	4
15 km	Ekaterina Dafovska	53:52.0	1	54:52.0	1st place, gold medalist(s)

Women's 4 × 7.5 km relay

Athletes	Race		
Athletes	Misses ^{1}	Time	Rank
Radka Popova; Ekaterina Dafovska; Pavlina Filipova; Valentina Peychinova	3	1'48:55.2	16

^{1} A penalty loop of 150 metres had to be skied per missed target.
^{2} One minute added per missed target.

== Cross-country skiing ==
Two Bulgarian athletes participated in the cross-country skiing events – Slavcho Batinkov and Irina Nikulchina.

The women's 15 km classical also took place on 8 February 1998. Nikulchina completed the course in 57 minutes 7.2 seconds to finish 63rd overall.

The men's 30 km classical took place on 9 February 1998. Batinkov completed the course in one hour 50 minutes 35 seconds to finish 60th overall.

The women's 5 km classical also took place on 9 February 1998. Nikulchina completed the course in 20 minutes 52.6 seconds to finish 70th overall.

The women's 10 km freestyle pursuit took place on 10 February 1998. Nikulchina completed the combined courses in 34 minutes 13.5 seconds to finish 53rd overall.

The men's 10 km classical took place on 12 February 1998. Batinkov completed the course in 33 minutes 23.2 seconds to finish 84th overall.

The men's 15 km freestyle pursuit took place on 14 February 1998. Batinkov completed the combined courses in 49 minutes 41.5 seconds to finish 61st overall.

The women's 30 km freestyle also took place on 20 February 1998. Nikulchina completed the course in one hour 31 minutes 4.7 seconds to finish 28th overall.

Men

Event	Athlete	Race	
Event	Athlete	Time	Rank
10 km C	Slavcho Batinkov	33:23.2	84
15 km pursuit^{1} F	Slavcho Batinkov	49:41.5	61
30 km C	Slavcho Batinkov	1'50:35.0	60

^{1} Starting delay based on 10 km results.
C = Classical style, F = Freestyle

Women

Event	Athlete	Race	
Event	Athlete	Time	Rank
5 km C	Irina Nikulchina	20:52.6	70
10 km pursuit^{2} F	Irina Nikulchina	34:13.5	53
15 km C	Irina Nikulchina	57:07.2	63
30 km F	Irina Nikulchina	1'31:04.7	28

^{2} Starting delay based on 5 km results.
C = Classical style, F = Freestyle

== Figure skating ==
Four Bulgarian athletes participated in the figure skating events – Albena Denkova, Ivan Dinev, Sofia Penkova and Maxim Staviyski.

The men's singles took place on 12 and 14 February 1998. Dinev finished 11th overall.

The women's singles took place on 18 and 20 February 1998. Penkova finished 28th overall.

The ice dance took place on 13, 15 and 16 February 1998. Denkova and Staviyski finished 18th overall.

Men

Athlete	SP	FS	TFP	Rank
Ivan Dinev	7	14	17.5	11

Women

Athlete	SP	FS	TFP	Rank
Sofia Penkova	28	DNF	DNF	–

Ice Dancing

Athletes	CD1	CD2	OD	FD	TFP	Rank
Albena Denkova; Maxim Staviyski	18	18	18	18	36.0	18

== Short track speed skating ==
Two Bulgarian athletes participated in the short track speed skating events – Evgeniya Radanova and Daniela Vlaeva.

The women's 500 m took place on 19 February 1998. In round one, Radanova finished first in heat six to advance to the quarter-finals. Vlaeva finished third in heat eight and did not advance. In the quarter-finals, Radanova was disqualified from heat three.

The women's 1000 m took place on 21 February 1998. In round one, Radanova finished second in heat seven to advance to the quarter-finals. Vlaeva finished third in heat two and did not advance. In the quarter-finals, Radanova finished third in heat two and did not advance.

Women

Athlete	Event	Round one		Quarter–finals		Semi–finals		Finals	
Athlete	Event	Time	Rank	Time	Rank	Time	Rank	Time	Final rank
Evgeniya Radanova	500 m	45.977	1 Q	DSQ	–	did not advance			
Daniela Vlaeva	500 m	46.681	3	did not advance					
Daniela Vlaeva	1000 m	1:37.124	3	did not advance					
Evgeniya Radanova	1000 m	1:39.279	2 Q	1:38.510	3	did not advance			

== Snowboarding ==
One Bulgarian athlete participated in the snowboarding events – Mariya Dimova.

The women's giant slalom took place on 9 February 1998. Dimova completed her first run in one minute 23.31 seconds and her second run in one minute 19.53 seconds for a combined time of two minutes 42.84 seconds to finish 20th overall.

Women's giant slalom

Athlete	Race 1	Race 2	Total	
Athlete	Time	Time	Time	Rank
Mariya Dimova	1:23.31	1:19.53	2:42.84	20

== See also ==
- Official Olympic Reports
- International Olympic Committee results database
- Olympic Winter Games 1998, full results by sports-reference.com
