= List of flag bearers for Bulgaria at the Olympics =

Bulgaria at the Olympics
- IOC code: BUL
- NOC: Bulgarian Olympic Committee
- Website: www.bgolympic.org (in Bulgarian and English)
- Medals: Gold 58 Silver 91 Bronze 90 Total 239

Summer appearances
- 1896; 1900–1920; 1924; 1928; 1932; 1936; 1948; 1952; 1956; 1960; 1964; 1968; 1972; 1976; 1980; 1984; 1988; 1992; 1996; 2000; 2004; 2008; 2012; 2016; 2020; 2024

Winter appearances
- 1936; 1948; 1952; 1956; 1960; 1964; 1968; 1972; 1976; 1980; 1984; 1988; 1992; 1994; 1998; 2002; 2006; 2010; 2014; 2018; 2022; 2026

This is a list of flag bearers who have represented Bulgaria at the Olympics.

Flag bearers carry the national flag of their country at the opening ceremony of the Olympic Games.

| # | Event year | Season | Flag bearer | Sport |
|---|---|---|---|---|
| 1 | 1924 | Summer | Kiril Petrunov | Athletics |
| 2 | 1928 | Summer | Todor Semov | Equestrian |
| 3 | 1936 | Summer | Lyuben Doychev | Athletics |
| 4 | 1952 | Summer | Boris Nikolov | Boxing |
| 5 | 1956 | Summer | Georgi Panov | Basketball |
| 6 | 1960 | Summer | Georgi Panov | Basketball |
| 7 | 1964 | Summer | Enyu Valchev | Wrestling |
| 8 | 1968 | Summer | Prodan Gardzhev | Wrestling |
| 9 | 1972 | Summer | Dimitar Zlatanov | Volleyball |
| 10 | 1976 | Summer | Aleksandar Tomov | Wrestling |
| 11 | 1980 | Winter | Petar Popangelov | Alpine skiing |
| 12 | 1980 | Summer | Aleksandar Tomov | Wrestling |
| 13 | 1984 | Winter | Vladimir Velichkov | Biathlon |
| 14 | 1988 | Winter | Vladimir Velichkov | Biathlon |
| 15 | 1988 | Summer | Vasil Etropolski | Fencing |
| 16 | 1992 | Winter | Iva Karagiozova-Shkodreva | Biathlon |
| 17 | 1992 | Summer | Ivaylo Yordanov | Wrestling |
| 18 | 1994 | Winter | Nadezhda Aleksieva | Biathlon |
| 19 | 1996 | Summer | Dimo Tonev | Volleyball |
| 20 | 1998 | Winter | Lyubomir Popov | Alpine skiing |
| 21 | 2000 | Summer | Ivo Yanakiev | Rowing |
| 22 | 2002 | Winter | Stefan Georgiev | Alpine skiing |
| 23 | 2004 | Summer | Maria Grozdeva | Shooting |
| 24 | 2006 | Winter | Ekaterina Dafovska | Biathlon |
| 25 | 2008 | Summer | Petar Stoychev | Swimming |
| 26 | 2010 | Winter | Aleksandra Zhekova | Snowboarding |
| 27 | 2012 | Summer | Yordan Yovchev | Gymnastics |
| 28 | 2014 | Winter | Maria Kirkova | Alpine skiing |
| 29 | 2016 | Summer | Ivet Lalova | Athletics |
| 30 | 2018 | Winter | Radoslav Yankov | Snowboarding |
| 31 | 2020 | Summer | Maria Grozdeva | Shooting |
| 31 | 2020 | Summer | Josif Miladinov | Swimming |
| 32 | 2022 | Winter | Maria Zdravkova | Biathlon |
| 32 | 2022 | Winter | Radoslav Yankov | Snowboarding |
| 33 | 2024 | Summer | Stanimira Petrova | Boxing |
| 33 | 2024 | Summer | Lyubomir Epitropov | Swimming |
| 34 | 2026 | Winter | Alexandra Feigin | Figure skating |
| 34 | 2026 | Winter | Vladimir Iliev | Biathlon |

== See also ==
- Bulgaria at the Olympics
