= Bulgaria at the 2006 Winter Olympics =

- IOC code: BUL
- NOC: Bulgarian Olympic Committee
- Website: www.bgolympic.org (in Bulgarian and English)

in Turin
- Competitors: 21 in 8 sports
- Flag bearers: Ekaterina Dafovska (opening); Evgenia Radanova (closing)
- Medals Ranked 21st: Gold 0 Silver 1 Bronze 0 Total 1

Winter Olympics appearances (overview)
- 1936; 1948; 1952; 1956; 1960; 1964; 1968; 1972; 1976; 1980; 1984; 1988; 1992; 1994; 1998; 2002; 2006; 2010; 2014; 2018; 2022; 2026

Bulgaria competed at the 2006 Winter Olympics in Turin, Italy.

== Medalists ==
Medal	Name	Sport	Event
Silver	Evgenia Radanova	Short track speed skating	Women's 500 m

== Alpine skiing ==
Athlete	Event					
Athlete	Event	Run 1	Run 2	Run 3	Total	Rank
Stefan Georgiev	Men's slalom	58.30	54.25	n/a	1:52.55	25
Stefan Georgiev	Men's combined	1:43.86	DNF			
Maria Kirkova	Women's slalom	46.58	DNF			
Mihail Sediankov	Men's slalom	DNF				
Mihail Sediankov	Men's combined	1:46.10	49.11	48.69	3:23.90	31
Dean Todorov	Men's slalom	1:00.69	DNF			

Note: In the men's combined, run 1 is the downhill, and runs 2 and 3 are the slalom. In the women's combined, run 1 and 2 are the slalom, and run 3 the downhill.

== Biathlon ==
Men

Athlete	Event			
Athlete	Event	Time	Misses	Rank
Vitaliy Rudenchyk	Sprint	27:59.1	1 (0+1)	21
Vitaliy Rudenchyk	Pursuit	39:04.76	4 (1+1+2+0)	33
Vitaliy Rudenchyk	Individual	1:02:30.0	6 (0+3+1+2)	61

Women

Athlete	Event			
Athlete	Event	Time	Misses	Rank
Ekaterina Dafovska	Sprint	24:23.2	2 (0+2)	33
Ekaterina Dafovska	Pursuit	42:07.68	3 (0+1+3+2)	28
Ekaterina Dafovska	Mass start	42:09.4	3 (1+1+0+1)	8
Ekaterina Dafovska	Individual	52:45.1	3 (0+1+1+1)	11
Pavlina Filipova	Sprint	24:53.2	2 (1+1)	46
Pavlina Filipova	Pursuit	43:04.53	8 (0+1+2+3)	32
Pavlina Filipova	Individual	56:07.7	5 (1+0+1+3)	43
Nina Kadeva	Individual	57:15.0	5 (2+1+0+2)	54
Irina Nikulchina	Sprint	24:30.4	4 (2+2)	36
Irina Nikulchina	Pursuit	42:26.84	7 (1+0+3+3)	30
Irina Nikulchina	Individual	54:29.3	6 (1+2+2+1)	28
Radka Popova	Sprint	26:01.1	2 (0+2)	58
Radka Popova	Pursuit	LAP	3 (0+1+0+2)	n/a
Pavlina Filipova; Radka Popova; Irina Nikulchina; Ekaterina Dafovska	Relay	1:20:38.7	17 (5+12)	8

Key: LAP indicates an athlete was lapped, and did not finish the race.

== Cross-country skiing ==
Distance

Athlete	Event		
Athlete	Event	Total	Rank
Ivan Bariakov	Men's 15 km classical	44:06.3	67
Ivan Bariakov	Men's 30 km pursuit	DNF	

Sprint

Athlete	Event	Qualifying		Quarterfinal		Semifinal		Final	
Athlete	Event	Total	Rank	Total	Rank	Total	Rank	Total	Rank
Ivan Bariakov	Men's sprint	2:32.18	71	did not advance					

== Figure skating ==
Athlete	Event	CD		SP/OD		FS/FD		Total	
Athlete	Event	Points	Rank	Points	Rank	Points	Rank	Points	Rank
Ivan Dinev	Men's	n/a		63.64	15 Q	116.47	18	180.11	17
Albena Denkova; Maxim Staviski	Ice dance	37.65	3	55.85	5	96.03	5	189.53	5
Rumyana Spasova; Stanimir Todorov	Pairs	n/a		37.27	19	73.98	18	111.25	19

Key: CD = Compulsory Dance, FD = Free Dance, FS = Free Skate, OD = Original Dance, SP = Short program

== Luge ==
Athlete	Event						
Athlete	Event	Run 1	Run 2	Run 3	Run 4	Total	Rank
Peter Iliev	Men's singles	54.806	55.189	55.761	53.927	3:39.683	31

== Short track speed skating ==
Athlete	Event	Heat		Quarterfinal		Semifinal		Final	
Athlete	Event	Time	Rank	Time	Rank	Time	Rank	Time	Rank
Evgenia Radanova	Women's 500 m	45.703	1 Q	44.252	1 Q	44.711	2 Q	44.374	Silver medal
Evgenia Radanova	Women's 1000 m	1:35.765	1 Q	disqualified					
Evgenia Radanova	Women's 1500 m	2:27.155	1 Q	n/a		2:27.145	3	Final B 2:29.314	6

Key: 'ADV' indicates a skater was advanced due to being interfered with.

== Ski jumping ==
Athlete	Event	Qualifying		First round		Final		
Athlete	Event	Points	Rank	Points	Rank	Points	Total	Rank
Petar Fartunov	Men's normal hill	85.0	49	Did not advance				
Petar Fartunov	Men's large hill	26.6	52	Did not advance				
Georgi Zharkov	Men's normal hill	77.5	51	Did not advance				
Georgi Zharkov	Men's large hill	59.3	44	Did not advance				

Note: PQ indicates a skier was pre-qualified for the final, based on entry rankings.

== Snowboarding ==
Parallel GS

Athlete	Event	Qualification		Round of 16	Quarterfinals	Semifinals	Finals	
Athlete	Event	Time	Rank	Opposition Time	Opposition Time	Opposition Time	Opposition Time	Rank
Aleksandra Zhekova	Women's parallel giant slalom	1:25.01	25	Did not advance				

Key: '+ Time' represents a deficit; the brackets indicate the results of each run.

Snowboard Cross

Athlete	Event	Qualifying		1/8 Finals	Quarterfinals	Semifinals	Finals	
Athlete	Event	Time	Rank	Position	Position	Position	Position	Rank
Aleksandra Zhekova	Women's snowboard cross	1:35.50	22	Did not advance				
