= Australia at the 2002 Winter Olympics =

- IOC code: AUS
- NOC: Australian Olympic Committee
- Website: www.olympics.com.au

in Salt Lake City
- Competitors: 27
- Flag bearers: Adrian Costa (opening); Steven Bradbury (closing)
- Medals Ranked 15th: Gold 2 Silver 0 Bronze 0 Total 2

Winter Olympics appearances (overview)
- 1936; 1948; 1952; 1956; 1960; 1964; 1968; 1972; 1976; 1980; 1984; 1988; 1992; 1994; 1998; 2002; 2006; 2010; 2014; 2018; 2022; 2026

Australia competed at the 2002 Winter Olympics in Salt Lake City, Utah, United States, winning its first two gold medals in the Winter Games. It was the nation's best performance at the Winter Games prior to the 2010 Winter Olympics in Vancouver.

== Overview ==
Australia's first ever Winter Olympic gold, also the first such medal won by a competitor from any Southern Hemisphere country and semitropical nation was won by Steven Bradbury in the 1000 m short track speed skating. Well off the pace of the medal favourites, Bradbury was positioned at the rear in the semifinal, only to see his competitors crash into each other, allowing him through to the final. Again well off the pace in the final all four other competitors crashed out at the final corner, leaving a shocked Bradbury to take the gold medal. Bradbury was also part of the 1994 relay team that won Australia's first Winter Olympics medal.

Alisa Camplin, who hadn't won a world cup event before and was so nervous she didn't eat dinner the night before the final, won the second gold, in aerial skiing. Jacqui Cooper was previously a favourite, but she injured herself before the competition.

Jenny Owens had a top 10 result, finishing 9th in the combined downhill event, the second best performance by any Australian at an Olympic Games.

Australia competed in alpine skiing, figure skating, freestyle skiing, short track speed skating, and snowboarding. This was the fewest sports Australia had competed in since 1984. No Australian cross-country skiers competed in the Olympics for the first time since 1976, and no bobsledders competed for the first time since Australia's debut in 1988. Australian bobsledder Will Alstergren said "We also beat half the teams currently in Salt Lake City, but unfortunately we couldn't meet the very high standard of the AOC, the Australian Olympic Committee". Australian selection standards was also listed as a factor for Australia not competing in cross-country skiing at Salt Lake City.

During the 2002 Winter Olympics, the Australian broadcaster, the Seven Network, included in its coverage an irreverent talk show called The Ice Dream, which interviewed several celebrities and promoted the Smiggin Holes 2010 Winter Olympic bid. Bradbury's and Camplin's triumphs were celebrated by Australia Post issuing stamps of them, which followed on from them issuing stamps of Australian gold medallists at the 2000 Sydney Olympics. They were produced by high-speed offset stamp-printing, unlike the digitally produced 2000 stamps. Bradbury's stamp was issued on 20 February, and Camplin's was issued on 22 February, four days after their respective victories. Each received A$20,000 for the use of their image. Bradbury said "Should get me a car. I haven't had a car for a long time." and later described having a stamp issued as "a great honour". Camplin was also delighted, saying "For us to be put in with the summer Olympians who had their stamps and the previous 39 sporting legends who've had their stamps is amazing."

== Medalists ==
Medal	Name	Sport	Event	Date
Gold	Steven Bradbury	Short track speed skating	Men's 1000 m	16 February
Gold	Alisa Camplin	Freestyle skiing	Women's aerials	18 February

== Alpine skiing ==
Men

Athlete	Event	Run 1 (DH)		Run 2 (Sl)		Run 3 (Sl)		Final/Total		
Athlete	Event	Time	Rank	Time	Rank	Time	Rank	Time	Diff	Rank
A. J. Bear	Downhill	—N/a						1:43.19	+4.06	37
A. J. Bear	Super-G	—N/a						Disqualified		
A. J. Bear	Combined	1:41.02	12	52.45	24	Disqualified				
Craig Branch	Downhill	—N/a						1:45.34	+6.21	45
Craig Branch	Super-G	—N/a						1:27.15	+5.57	27
Craig Branch	Combined	Disqualified								
Brad Wall	Giant slalom	1:15.69	37	1:14.59	35	—N/a		2:30.28	+7.00	33
Michael Dickson	Slalom	56.88	41	did not finish		—N/a		did not finish		

Women

Athlete	Event	Run 1 (DH)		Run 2 (Sl)		Run 3 (Sl)		Final/Total		
Athlete	Event	Time	Rank	Time	Rank	Time	Rank	Time	Diff	Rank
Alice Jones	Downhill	—N/a						1:43.07	+3.51	27
Alice Jones	Super-G	—N/a						did not finish		
Alice Jones	Combined	47.80	18	44.59	10	1:17.83	15	2:50.22	+6.94	12
Jenny Owens	Downhill	—N/a						1:44.15	+4.59	29
Jenny Owens	Super-G	—N/a						1:17.84	+4.25	29
Jenny Owens	Giant slalom	did not finish				—N/a		did not finish		
Jenny Owens	Combined	47.37	14	44.98	12	1:16.96	9	2:49.31	+6.03	9
Jeannette Korten	Giant slalom	1:19.00	30	Disqualified		—N/a		Disqualified		
Jeannette Korten	Slalom	57.85	34	58.25	24	—N/a		1:56.10	+10.00	25
Rowena Bright	Slalom	1:00.22	42	did not finish		—N/a		did not finish		
Rowena Bright	Combined	1:04.95	29	46.27	20	1:19.46	21	3:10.68	+27.40	30
Kathrin Nikolussi	Slalom	did not finish				—N/a		did not finish		
Zali Steggall	Slalom	did not finish				—N/a		did not finish		

== Figure skating ==
Athlete(s)	Event	CD1	CD2	SP/OD	FS/FD	Total	
Athlete(s)	Event	FP	FP	FP	FP	TFP	Rank
Anthony Liu	Men's	—N/a		10 Q	10	15.0	10
Stephanie Zhang	Ladies'	—N/a		25	did not advance		

== Freestyle skiing ==
Alisa Camplin provided Australia with its second gold medal for the games.

Men

Athlete	Event	Qualifying		Final	
Athlete	Event	Points	Rank	Points	Rank
Adrian Costa	Moguls	24.13	18	did not advance	
Trennon Paynter	Moguls	22.53	23	did not advance	

Women

Athlete	Event	Qualifying		Final	
Athlete	Event	Points	Rank	Points	Rank
Manuela Berchtold	Moguls	19.59	27	did not advance	
Maria Despas	Moguls	21.19	21	did not advance	
Jane Sexton	Moguls	20.47	25	did not advance	
Alisa Camplin	Aerials	183.66	2 Q	193.47	1st place, gold medalist(s)
Lydia Ierodiaconou	Aerials	166.06	10 Q	169.38	8

== Short track speed skating ==
Steven Bradbury won Australia's and the Southern Hemisphere's first Winter Olympics gold medal in the 1000 metres event. Richard Goerlitz also attended these games, but did not compete.

Men

Athlete	Event	Heat		Quarterfinal		Semifinal		Final	
Athlete	Event	Time	Rank	Time	Rank	Time	Rank	Time	Rank
Steven Bradbury	500 m	43.225	2 Q	44.982	3	did not advance			14
Steven Bradbury	1000 m	1:30.956	1 Q	1:29.265	2 Q	1:29.189	1 Q	1:29.109	1st place, gold medalist(s)
Steven Bradbury	1500 m	2:22.632	3 Q	—N/a		2:25.457	4 QB	B Final; 2:28.604	10
Andrew McNee	500 m	44.289	4	did not advance					28
Mark McNee	1000 m	1:39.325	2 Q	1:46.701	4	did not advance			15
Mark McNee	1500 m	2:27.840	5	—N/a		did not advance			28
Steven Bradbury; Alex McEwan; Mark McNee; Stephen Lee	5000 m relay	—N/a				7:19.177	3 QB	B Final; 7:45.271	6

== Snowboarding ==
Parallel GS

Athlete	Event	Qualification		Round of 16	Quarterfinals	Semifinals	Finals	
Athlete	Event	Time	Rank	Opposition Time	Opposition Time	Opposition Time	Opposition Time	Rank
Zeke Steggall	Men's parallel giant slalom	38.69	26	did not advance				26

== See also ==
- Australia at the Winter Olympics
