= Freestyle skiing at the 2002 Winter Olympics – Women's moguls =

Women's moguls at the XIX Olympic Winter Games
- Venue: Park City
- Dates: 9 February
- Competitors: 29 from 14 nations
- Winning score: 25,94

Medalists
1st place, gold medalist(s)		Kari Traa	Norway
2nd place, silver medalist(s)		Shannon Bahrke	United States
3rd place, bronze medalist(s)		Tae Satoya	Japan

The Women's Moguls event in freestyle skiing at the 2002 Winter Olympics in Salt Lake City, United States took place on 9 February at Park City.

== Results ==
=== Qualification ===
The qualification round was held at 09:00, with 29 skiers competing. The top 16 advanced to the final.

Rank	Name	Country	Score	Notes
1	Kari Traa	Norway	25.11	Q
2	Ann Battelle	United States	24.10	Q
3	Hannah Hardaway	United States	23.84	Q
4	Aiko Uemura	Japan	23.82	Q
5	Shannon Bahrke	United States	23.74	Q
6	Tae Satoya	Japan	23.65	Q
7	Sandra Laoura	France	23.54	Q
8	Margarita Marbler	Austria	23.54	Q
9	Jennifer Heil	Canada	23.19	Q
10	Minna Karhu	Finland	22.66	Q
11	Tami Bradley	Canada	22.55	Q
12	Marina Cherkasova	Russia	22.44	Q
12	Sara Kjellin	Sweden	22.44	Q
14	Anna Bolbjerg	Denmark	22.40	Q
15	Kelly Ringstad	Canada	22.40	Q
16	Yelena Vorona	Russia	22.35	Q
17	Ingrid Berntsen	Norway	22.28	
18	Jillian Vogtli	United States	22.16	
19	Nikola Sudová	Czech Republic	21.49	
20	Miyuki Hatanaka	Japan	21.36	
21	Maria Despas	Australia	21.19	
22	Olga Lazarenko	Russia	21.08	
23	Lyudmila Dymchenko	Russia	20.79	
24	Kathleen Allais	France	20.54	
25	Jane Sexton	Australia	20.47	
26	Corinne Bodmer	Switzerland	20.28	
27	Manuela Berchtold	Australia	19.59	
28	Joanne Bromfield	Great Britain	18.75	
29	Laura Donaldson	Great Britain	18.41	

=== Final ===
The final was held at 12:00.

Rank	Athlete	Score
Gold medal	Kari Traa (NOR)	25.94
Silver medal	Shannon Bahrke (USA)	25.06
Bronze medal	Tae Satoya (JPN)	24.85
4	Jennifer Heil (CAN)	24.84
5	Hannah Hardaway (USA)	24.77
6	Aiko Uemura (JPN)	24.66
7	Ann Battelle (USA)	24.62
8	Sandra Laoura (FRA)	24.12
9	Marina Cherkasova (RUS)	23.52
10	Margarita Marbler (AUT)	23.18
11	Elena Vorona (RUS)	23.17
12	Minna Karhu (FIN)	23.07
13	Kelly Ringstad (CAN)	22.86
14	Tami Bradley (CAN)	18.46
-	Sara Kjellin (SWE)	DNF
-	Anna Bolbjerg (DEN)	DNF
