= Canada at the 2002 Winter Olympics =

- IOC code: CAN
- NOC: Canadian Olympic Committee
- Website: www.olympic.ca (in English and French)

in Salt Lake City
- Competitors: 150 (85 men, 65 women) in 13 sports
- Flag bearers: Catriona Le May Doan (opening); Jamie Salé and David Pelletier (closing)
- Medals Ranked 4th: Gold 7 Silver 3 Bronze 7 Total 17

Winter Olympics appearances (overview)
- 1924; 1928; 1932; 1936; 1948; 1952; 1956; 1960; 1964; 1968; 1972; 1976; 1980; 1984; 1988; 1992; 1994; 1998; 2002; 2006; 2010; 2014; 2018; 2022; 2026

Canada competed at the 2002 Winter Olympics in Salt Lake City, Utah, United States. Canada has competed at every Winter Olympic Games.

These games were the second best ever for Canada at the time, as they finished in fourth place in the medal standings with 17 medals, seven of which were gold.

== Medalists ==
Medal	Name	Sport	Event
Gold	Beckie Scott	Cross-country skiing	Women's 2 × 5 kilometre pursuit
Gold	Jamie Salé; David Pelletier	Figure skating	Pairs
Gold	Men's ice hockey team: Ed Belfour; Rob Blake; Eric Brewer; Martin Brodeur; Theoren Fleury; Adam Foote; Simon Gagné; Jarome Iginla; Curtis Joseph; Ed Jovanovski; Paul Kariya; Mario Lemieux; Eric Lindros; Al MacInnis; Scott Niedermayer; Joe Nieuwendyk; Owen Nolan; Michael Peca; Chris Pronger; Joe Sakic; Brendan Shanahan; Ryan Smyth; Steve Yzerman	Ice hockey	Men's tournament
Gold	Women's ice hockey team: Dana Antal; Kelly Béchard; Jennifer Botterill; Thérèse Brisson; Cassie Campbell; Isabelle Chartrand; Lori Dupuis; Danielle Goyette; Geraldine Heaney; Jayna Hefford; Becky Kellar; Caroline Ouellette; Cherie Piper; Cheryl Pounder; Tammy Lee Shewchuk; Sami Jo Small; Colleen Sostorics; Kim St-Pierre; Vicky Sunohara; Hayley Wickenheiser	Ice hockey	Women's tournament
Gold	Marc Gagnon	Short track speed skating	Men's 500 m
Gold	Éric Bédard; Marc Gagnon; Jonathan Guilmette; François-Louis Tremblay; Mathieu Turcotte	Short track speed skating	Men's 5000 m relay
Gold	Catriona Le May Doan	Speed skating	Women's 500 m
Silver	Don Bartlett; Kevin Martin; Carter Rycroft; Ken Tralnberg; Don Walchuk	Curling	Men's
Silver	Veronica Brenner	Freestyle skiing	Women's aerials
Silver	Jonathan Guilmette	Short track speed skating	Men's 500 m
Bronze	Diane Dezura; Kelley Law; Cheryl Noble; Julie Skinner; Georgina Wheatcroft	Curling	Women's
Bronze	Deidra Dionne	Freestyle skiing	Women's aerials
Bronze	Mathieu Turcotte	Short track speed skating	Men's 1000 m
Bronze	Marc Gagnon	Short track speed skating	Men's 1500 m
Bronze	Isabelle Charest; Marie-Ève Drolet; Amélie Goulet-Nadon; Alanna Kraus; Tania Vicent	Short track speed skating	Women's 3000 m relay
Bronze	Cindy Klassen	Speed skating	Women's 3000 m
Bronze	Clara Hughes	Speed skating	Women's 5000 m

Medals by sport
Sport	gold	silver	bronze	Total
Short track speed skating	2	1	3	6
Ice hockey	2	0	0	2
Speed skating	1	0	2	3
Cross-country skiing	1	0	0	1
Figure skating	1	0	0	1
Curling	0	1	1	2
Freestyle skiing	0	1	1	2
Total	7	3	7	17

== Notable events ==
- Canada won double gold in ice hockey after going 50 years without a gold medal. Both the women's and men's teams won gold, beating the United States in both games.
- Marc Gagnon, a short-track speed skater, won double gold, and a bronze medal. One of his golds was for the 5000 m relay team.
- Catriona Le May Doan capped off an impressive speed skating career winning gold in the 500 m. She became the first Canadian to defend their gold medal, which she first won at the 1998 Games.
- Jamie Salé and David Pelletier won gold in the pairs figure skating event. They were given the gold after a controversy involving the French judge of their event. Both the Canadians and their Russian rivals would win gold in the same event.
- Beckie Scott became the first North American to win a medal in cross-country skiing, when she placed third in her event. Later on however, she was bumped up to gold when the two finishers ahead of her were disqualified.
- Clara Hughes made the transition from bronze medalist cyclist to bronze medalist speed skater when she finished 3rd in the 5000 m.
- Jeremy Wotherspoon, expected to win gold in his event, but disappointed many when he tripped and fell after starting in his 500 m event.
- Elvis Stojko finished his career with an 8th-place finish in the men's figure skating event.

== Alpine skiing ==
Men

Athlete	Event	Final				
Athlete	Event	Run 1	Run 2	Run 3	Total	Rank
Dave Anderson	Downhill	n/a			1:43.20	38
Thomas Grandi	Giant slalom	1:13.74	1:11.50	n/a	2:25.24	12
Thomas Grandi	Slalom	51.15	55.08	n/a	1:46.23	16
Thomas Grandi	Super-G	n/a			did not finish	
Darin McBeath	Downhill	n/a			1:42.15	32
Darin McBeath	Super-G	n/a			did not finish	
Darin McBeath	Combined	1:41.07	51.78	56.72	3:29.57	17
Ed Podivinsky	Downhill	n/a			1:41.69	24
Ed Podivinsky	Super-G	n/a			did not finish	
Ed Podivinsky	Combined	1:40.59	did not finish			
Jean-Philippe Roy	Giant slalom	1:14.34	did not finish			
Jean-Philippe Roy	Slalom	did not finish				
Jean-Philippe Roy	Combined	1:43.31	46.87	52.50	3:22.68	8

Women

Athlete	Event	Final				
Athlete	Event	Run 1	Run 2	Run 3	Total	Rank
Sara-Maude Boucher	Downhill	n/a			did not start	
Sara-Maude Boucher	Super-G	n/a			did not finish	
Sara-Maude Boucher	Combined	46.37	44.90	1:18.10	2:49.37	10
Emily Brydon	Giant slalom	1:21.03	1:19.59	n/a	2:40.62	38
Emily Brydon	Slalom	58.58	59.61	n/a	1:58.19	27
Allison Forsyth	Giant slalom	1:17.36	1:15.42	n/a	2:32.78	7
Allison Forsyth	Slalom	did not finish				
Anne-Marie LeFrançois	Downhill	n/a			did not finish	
Anne-Marie LeFrançois	Super-G	n/a			did not finish	
Geneviève Simard	Super-G	n/a			1:15.62	18
Geneviève Simard	Combined	45.76	44.12	1:18.26	2:48.14	7
Melanie Turgeon	Downhill	n/a			1:40.71	8
Melanie Turgeon	Super-G	n/a			1:15.76	20

== Biathlon ==
Athlete	Event	Final		
Athlete	Event	Time	Misses	Rank
Robin Clegg	Men's sprint	27:28.3	2	43
Robin Clegg	Men's pursuit	37:04.6	3	42
Robin Clegg	Men's individual	53:17.5	2	28

== Bobsleigh ==
Athlete	Event	Final					
Athlete	Event	Run 1	Run 2	Run 3	Run 4	Total	Rank
Pierre Lueders; Giulio Zardo	Two-man	47.67	47.70	47.65	47.71	3:10.73	5
Yannik Morin; John Sokolowski	Two-man	48.41	48.50	48.55	48.70	3:14.16	24
Christina Smith; Paula McKenzie	Two-woman	49.60	49.75			1:39.35	9
Pierre Lueders; Ken Leblanc; Giulio Zardo; Pascal Caron	Four-man	47.12	46.97	47.41	47.67	3:09.17	9

== Cross-country skiing ==
Distance

Athlete	Event	Final	
Athlete	Event	Total	Rank
Donald Farley	Men's 15 km classical	41:26.6	46
Donald Farley	Men's 20 km pursuit	did not start	
Donald Farley	Men's 30 km freestyle	1:17:43.6	47
Donald Farley	Men's 50 km classical	2:21:26.5	40
Amanda Fortier	Women's 10 km pursuit	14:30.5	51
Amanda Fortier	Women's 15 km freestyle	43:38.7	35
Amanda Fortier	Women's 30 km classical	1:42:08.1	28
Jamie Fortier	Women's 10 km classical	31:42.1	47
Jamie Fortier	Women's 15 km freestyle	43:54.0	38
Jamie Fortier	Women's 30 km classical	1:44:26.2	34
Sara Renner	Women's 10 km classical	29:46.7	15
Sara Renner	Women's 10 km pursuit	26:10.3	19
Sara Renner	Women's 30 km classical	did not start	
Beckie Scott	Women's 10 km classical	28:49.2	4
Beckie Scott	Women's 10 km pursuit	25:09.9	1st place, gold medalist(s)
Milaine Thériault	Women's 10 km classical	30:12.6	25
Milaine Thériault	Women's 10 km pursuit	26:29.1	35
Milaine Thériault	Women's 30 km classical	1:42:56.9	31
Sara Renner; Milaine Thériault; Amanda Fortier; Beckie Scott	Women's 4 x 5 km relay	50:49.6	8

Sprint

Athlete	Event	Qualifying		Quarterfinal		Semifinal		Final	
Athlete	Event	Total	Rank	Total	Rank	Total	Rank	Total	Rank
Donald Farley	Men's sprint	3:03.02	45	Did not advance					44
Jamie Fortier	Women's sprint	3:23.98	30	Did not advance					30
Sara Renner	Women's sprint	3:18.07	14 Q	3:42.4	2 Q	3:20.0	5	did not advance	9
Beckie Scott	Women's sprint	3:14.62	5 Q	3:15.8	1 Q	3:25.4	4	Final B 3:24.9	5
Milaine Thériault	Women's sprint	3:24.41	31	Did not advance					31

== Curling ==
=== Men's tournament ===
==== Group stage ====
Top four teams advanced to semi-finals.

Country	Skip	W	L
Canada	Kevin Martin	8	1
Norway	Pål Trulsen	7	2
Switzerland	Andreas Schwaller	6	3
Sweden	Peja Lindholm	6	3
Finland	Markku Uusipaavalniemi	5	4
Germany	Sebastian Stock	4	5
Denmark	Ulrik Schmidt	3	6
(United Kingdom) Great Britain	Hammy McMillan	3	6
United States	Tim Somerville	3	6
France	Dominique Dupont-Roc	0	9

Team 1	Score	Team 2
Canada	6–4	United Kingdom
United States	3–8	Canada
Finland	4–9	Canada
Canada	8–1	France
Canada	5–6	Sweden
Germany	7–9	Canada
Canada	7–2	Switzerland
Canada	9–4	Norway
Denmark	3–8	Canada

==== Medal round ====
Semi final

Sheet B	1	2	3	4	5	6	7	8	9	10	Final
Sweden (Lindholm)	0	2	0	0	1	0	1	0	0	0	4
Canada (Martin) 🔨	3	0	0	1	0	1	0	1	0	0	6

Gold medal game

Sheet C	1	2	3	4	5	6	7	8	9	10	Final
Canada (Martin) 🔨 (silver)	0	0	0	0	2	1	0	2	0	0	5
Norway (Trulsen)	0	1	0	2	0	0	1	0	1	1	6

Contestants
Ottewell CC, Edmonton
Skip: Kevin Martin
Third: Don Walchuk
Second: Carter Rycroft
Lead: Don Bartlett
Alternate: Ken Tralnberg

=== Women's tournament ===
==== Group stage ====
Top four teams advanced to semi-finals.

Country	Skip	W	L
Canada	Kelley Law	8	1
Switzerland	Luzia Ebnöther	7	2
United States	Kari Erickson	6	3
(United Kingdom) Great Britain	Rhona Martin	5	4
Germany	Natalie Neßler	5	4
Sweden	Elisabet Gustafson	5	4
Norway	Dordi Nordby	4	5
Japan	Akiko Katoh	2	7
Denmark	Lene Bidstrup	2	7
Russia	Olga Jarkova	1	8

Team 1	Score	Team 2
Sweden	4–5	Canada
Canada	6–5	Norway
Canada	7–6	Russia
United States	4–6	Canada
Canada	9–4	United Kingdom
Germany	4–8	Canada
Canada	9–4	Japan
Canada	9–4	Denmark
Switzerland	7–6	Canada

==== Medal round ====
Semi final

Sheet D	1	2	3	4	5	6	7	8	9	10	Final
Great Britain (Martin)	0	0	1	2	0	0	2	0	0	1	6
Canada (Law) 🔨	1	0	0	0	1	1	0	1	1	0	5

Bronze medal game

Sheet C	1	2	3	4	5	6	7	8	9	10	Final
United States (Erickson)	0	1	1	0	0	1	0	2	0	0	5
Canada (Law) 🔨 (bronze)	2	0	0	2	1	0	2	0	1	1	9

Contestants
Royal City CC, New Westminster
Skip: Kelley Law
Third: Julie Skinner
Second: Georgina Wheatcroft
Lead: Diane Nelson
Alternate: Cheryl Noble

== Figure skating ==
Men

Athlete	Points	SP	FS	Rank
Emanuel Sandhu	DNS	–	DNS	–
Elvis Stojko	11.5	7	8	8

Women

Athlete	Points	SP	FS	Rank
Jennifer Robinson	11.0	8	7	7

Pairs

Athletes	Points	SP	FS	Rank
Anabelle Langlois; Patrice Archetto	18.0	14	11	12
Jacinthe Larivière; Lenny Faustino	16.5	13	10	10
Jamie Salé; David Pelletier	n/a	2	n/a	1st place, gold medalist(s)

Ice Dancing

Athletes	Points	CD1	CD2	OD	FD	Rank
Marie-France Dubreuil; Patrice Lauzon	23.8	11	12	12	12	12
Shae-Lynn Bourne; Victor Kraatz	8.0	4	4	4	4	4

== Freestyle skiing ==
Men

Athlete	Event	Qualification			Final		
Athlete	Event	Time	Points	Rank	Time	Points	Rank
Jean-Luc Brassard	Moguls	28.77	23.31	21	did not advance		
Scott Bellavance	Moguls	28.71	25.14	10 Q	27.19	26.55	6
Stéphane Rochon	Moguls	28.55	25.57	7 Q	26.97	19.80	15
Ryan Johnson	Moguls	28.39	25.60	6 Q	28.11	26.55	7
Nicolas Fontaine	Aerials		212.48	16	did not advance		
Jeff Bean	Aerials		230.28	9 Q		250.97	4
Andy Capicik	Aerials		239.69	6 Q		243.78	8
Steve Omischl	Aerials		242.30	4 Q		222.04	11

Women

Athlete	Event	Qualification			Final		
Athlete	Event	Time	Points	Rank	Time	Points	Rank
Kelly Ringstad	Moguls	39.36	22.40	15 Q	36.94	22.86	13
Tami Bradley	Moguls	37.13	22.55	11 Q	37.99	18.46	14
Jennifer Heil	Moguls	34.87	23.19	9 Q	34.04	24.84	4
Veronika Bauer	Aerials		167.58	9 Q		153.88	10
Veronica Brenner	Aerials		168.03	8 Q		190.02	2nd place, silver medalist(s)
Deidra Dionne	Aerials		174.51	5 Q		189.26	3rd place, bronze medalist(s)

== Ice hockey ==
=== Men's tournament ===
==== First round – Group C ====
Team	GP	W	L	T	GF	GA	GD	Pts
Sweden	3	3	0	0	14	4	+10	6
Czech Republic	3	1	1	1	12	7	+5	3
Canada	3	1	1	1	8	10	−2	3
Germany	3	0	3	0	5	18	−13	0

All times are local (UTC-7).

15 February 2002; 16:10	Canada	2 – 5 (1–1, 0–4, 1–0)	Sweden	E Center, West Valley City; Attendance: 8,597

17 February 2002; 19:00	Canada	3 – 2 (0–0, 3–0, 0–2)	Germany	Peaks Ice Arena, Provo; Attendance: 6,425

18 February 2002; 16:10	Czech Republic	3 – 3 (1–1, 1–1, 1–1)	Canada	E Center, West Valley City; Attendance: 8,599

==== Knock-out stage ====
Quarter final

20 February 2002; 20:15	Finland	1 – 2 (0–1, 1–1, 0–0)	Canada	E Center, West Valley City; Attendance: 8,599

Semi final

22 February 2002; 12:00	Canada	7 – 1 (2–1, 2–0, 3–0)	Belarus	E Center, West Valley City; Attendance: 8,599

Gold medal game

24 February 2002; 13:00	United States	2 – 5 (1–2, 1–1, 0–2)	Canada (gold)	E Center, West Valley City; Attendance: 8,599

Amonte - 08:49; Rafalski - 35:30 / Goals / 14:50 - Kariya; 18:33 - Iginla; 38:19 - Sakic; 56:01 - Iginla; 58:40 - Sakic

Contestants

Gold:
Canada

Mario Lemieux – C
Paul Kariya
Ed Jovanovski
Curtis Joseph
Jarome Iginla
Simon Gagné
Chris Pronger
Michael Peca
Owen Nolan
Joe Nieuwendyk
Scott Niedermayer
Adam Foote
Theo Fleury
Martin Brodeur
Eric Brewer
Rob Blake
Ed Belfour
Steve Yzerman – A
Ryan Smyth
Brendan Shanahan
Joe Sakic – A
Al MacInnis
Eric Lindros

- Gold - "Team members Canada". International Olympic Committee.

=== Women's tournament ===
==== Group stage – Group A ====
Top two teams (shaded) advanced to semifinals.

Team	GP	W	L	T	GF	GA	GD	Pts
Canada	3	3	0	0	25	0	+25	6
Sweden	3	2	1	0	10	13	−3	4
Russia	3	1	2	0	6	11	−5	2
Kazakhstan	3	0	3	0	1	18	−17	0

All times are local (UTC-7).

11 February 2002; 11:00	Canada	7 – 0 (3–0, 2–0, 2–0)	Kazakhstan	E Center, West Valley City; Attendance: 7,321

13 February 2002; 11:00	Russia	0 – 7 (0–2, 0–2, 0–3)	Canada	E Center, West Valley City; Attendance: 8,213

16 February 2002; 19:00	Canada	11 – 0 (1–0, 4–0, 6–0)	Sweden	Peaks Ice Arena, Provo; Attendance: 6,306

==== Knock-out stage ====
Semi final

19 February 2002; 11:05	Canada	7 – 3 (2–1, 0–2, 5–0)	Finland	E Center, West Valley City; Attendance: 7,289

Gold medal game

21 February 2002; 17:10	United States	2 – 3 (0–1, 1–2, 1–0)	Canada (gold)	E Center, West Valley City; Attendance: 8,599

Contestants

Gold
Canada

Sami Jo Small
Becky Kellar
Colleen Sostorics
Thérèse Brisson
Cherie Piper
Cheryl Pounder
Lori Dupuis
Caroline Ouellette
Danielle Goyette
Jayna Hefford
Jennifer Botterill
Hayley Wickenheiser
Dana Antal
Kelly Bechard
Tammy Lee Shewchuk
Kim St-Pierre
Vicky Sunohara
Isabelle Chartrand
Cassie Campbell
Geraldine Heaney

== Luge ==
Athlete	Event	Final					
Athlete	Event	Run 1	Run 2	Run 3	Run 4	Total	Rank
Kyle Connelly	Men's singles	44.945	44.922	44.712	45.144	2:59.723	11
Chris Moffat	Men's singles	45.116	45.145	44.651	45.088	3:00.000	14
Tyler Seitz	Men's singles	45.051	45.169	44.756	45.245	3:00.221	19
Regan Lauscher	Women's singles	44.001	43.681	43.615	43.821	2:55.118	12
Grant Albrecht; Mike Moffat	Doubles	43.645	43.721	n/a		1:27.366	12
Chris Moffat; Eric Pothier	Doubles	43.285	43.216	n/a		1:26.501	5

== Short track speed skating ==
Men

Athlete	Event	Heat		Quarterfinal		Semifinal		Final	
Athlete	Event	Time	Rank	Time	Rank	Time	Rank	Time	Rank
Marc Gagnon	500 m	43.395	2 Q	42.384	2 Q	41.981	2 Q	41.802	1st place, gold medalist(s)
Marc Gagnon	1000 m	1:28.718	2 Q	disqualified					
Marc Gagnon	1500 m	2:20.126	1 Q	n/a		2:20.050	2 Q	2:18.806	3rd place, bronze medalist(s)
Jonathan Guilmette	500 m	42.326	1 Q	42.809	1 Q	42.201	1 Q	41.994	2nd place, silver medalist(s)
Jonathan Guilmette	1500 m	disqualified							
Mathieu Turcotte	1000 m	1:28.229	2 Q	1:27.185	1 Q	1:35.155	3 ADV	1:30.563	3rd place, bronze medalist(s)
Éric Bédard; Marc Gagnon; Jonathan Guilmette; François-Louis Tremblay; Mathieu Turcotte	5000 m relay					6:45.455	1 Q	6:51.579	1st place, gold medalist(s)

Women

Athlete	Event	Heat		Quarterfinal		Semifinal		Final	
Athlete	Event	Time	Rank	Time	Rank	Time	Rank	Time	Rank
Isabelle Charest	500 m	44.964	2 Q	45.011	3 ADV	44.307	2 Q	44.662	4
Marie-Ève Drolet	1000 m	1:40.646	2 Q	1:33.578	2 Q	1:37.916	1 Q	1:37.563	4
Marie-Ève Drolet	1500 m	2:29.652	3 Q	n/a		2:21.758	3	Final B 2:31.203	6
Alanna Kraus	500 m	45.101	1 Q	44.863	2 Q	44.776	3	Final B 44.930	6
Alanna Kraus	1000 m	1:33.622	1 Q	1:36.683	1 Q	1:35.510	3	Final B 1:35.642	8
Alanna Kraus	1500 m	2:26.968	2 Q	n/a		2:32.411	2 Q	3:05.002	5
Isabelle Charest; Marie-Ève Drolet; Amélie Goulet-Nadon; Alanna Kraus; Tania Vicent	3000 m relay					4:16.920	2 Q	4:15.738	3rd place, bronze medalist(s)

== Skeleton ==
Athlete	Event	Final			
Athlete	Event	Run 1	Run 2	Total	Rank
Duff Gibson	Men's	51.40	51.76	1:43.16	10
Jeff Pain	Men's	51.51	51.41	1:42.92	6
Pascal Richard	Men's	51.98	51.86	1:43.84	15
Lindsay Alcock	Women's	52.62	53.07	1:45.69	6
Michelle Kelly	Women's	53.76	53.56	1:47.32	10

== Snowboarding ==
Halfpipe

Athlete	Event	Qualifying run 1		Qualifying run 2		Final		
Athlete	Event	Points	Rank	Points	Rank	Run 1	Run 2	Rank
Trevor Andrew	Men's halfpipe	10.8	33	39.4	11	30.3	38.6	9
Brett Carpentier	Men's halfpipe	29.7	20	31.6	22	did not advance		22
Mike Michalchuk	Men's halfpipe	34.8	11	28.6	27	did not advance		27
Daniel Migneault	Men's halfpipe	19.2	28	28.7	26	did not advance		26
Natasza Zurek	Women's halfpipe	30.3	10	28.6	15	did not advance		15

Parallel GS

Athlete	Event	Qualification		Round of 16	Quarterfinals	Semifinals	Finals	
Athlete	Event	Time	Rank	Opposition Time	Opposition Time	Opposition Time	Opposition Time	Rank
Jasey Jay Anderson	Men's parallel giant slalom	39.09	29	did not advance				29
Mark Fawcett	Men's parallel giant slalom	37.53	17	did not advance				17
Jerome Sylvestre	Men's parallel giant slalom	36.86	6	Klug (USA) (11); L +0.05 (-0.26 +0.31)	did not advance			12
Ryan Wedding	Men's parallel giant slalom	38.61	24	did not advance				24

== Speed skating ==
Men

Athlete	Event	Race 1		Race 2		Final	
Athlete	Event	Time	Rank	Time	Rank	Time	Rank
Pat Bouchard	500 m	35.54	20	35.34	22	70.88	20
Pat Bouchard	1000 m					1:09.21	20
Éric Brisson	500 m	35.86	24	35.68	28	71.54	24
Steven Elm	1500 m					1:46.99	18
Steven Elm	5000 m					6:34.76	23
Mike Ireland	500 m	34.77	6	34.83	9	69.60	7
Mike Ireland	1000 m					1:08.88	14
Mark Knoll	5000 m					6:30.63	18
Philippe Marois	1500 m					1:48.13	28
Kevin Marshall	1000 m					1:09.26	20
Kevin Marshall	1500 m					1:46.75	17
Dustin Molicki	1500 m					1:46.00	12
Dustin Molicki	5000 m					6:26.29	11
Dustin Molicki	10000 m					13:54.49	16
Jeremy Wotherspoon	500 m	DNF	-	34.63	1	-	-
Jeremy Wotherspoon	1000 m					1:08.82	13

Women

Athlete	Event	Race 1		Race 2		Final	
Athlete	Event	Time	Rank	Time	Rank	Time	Rank
Susan Auch	500 m	38.84	20	38.76	19	77.60	21
Susan Auch	1000 m					1:17.89	27
Kristina Groves	1500 m					1:59.54	20
Kristina Groves	3000 m					4:06.44	8
Kristina Groves	5000 m					7:07.16	10
Clara Hughes	3000 m					4:06.57	10
Clara Hughes	5000 m					6:53.53	3rd place, bronze medalist(s)
Cindy Klassen	1000 m					1:15.08	13
Cindy Klassen	1500 m					1:55.59	4
Cindy Klassen	3000 m					3:58.97	3rd place, bronze medalist(s)
Cindy Klassen	5000 m					6:55.89	4
Catriona Le May Doan	500 m	37.30 OR	1	37.45	1	74.75 OR	1st place, gold medalist(s)
Catriona Le May Doan	1000 m					1:14.72	9
Cindy Overland	1500 m					2:00.02	25

== Official outfitter ==
- Roots Canada was the official outfitter of clothing for members of the Canadian Olympic team. The same clothing was also sold at Roots stores in Canada.
