= Bulgaria at the 2002 Winter Olympics =

- IOC code: BUL
- NOC: Bulgarian Olympic Committee
- Website: www.bgolympic.org (in Bulgarian and English)

in Salt Lake City
- Competitors: 23 (13 men and 10 women) in 7 sports
- Flag bearer: Stefan Georgiev
- Medals Ranked 20th: Gold 0 Silver 1 Bronze 2 Total 3

Winter Olympics appearances (overview)
- 1936; 1948; 1952; 1956; 1960; 1964; 1968; 1972; 1976; 1980; 1984; 1988; 1992; 1994; 1998; 2002; 2006; 2010; 2014; 2018; 2022; 2026; 2030

Bulgaria competed at the 2002 Winter Olympics in Salt Lake City, United States.

== Medalists ==
Medal	Name	Sport	Event
Silver	Evgenia Radanova	Short track speed skating	Women's 500m
Bronze	Irina Nikulchina	Biathlon	Women's 10 km Pursuit
Bronze	Evgenia Radanova	Short track speed skating	Women's 1,500 m

== Alpine skiing ==
Men

Athlete	Event	Race 1	Race 2	Total	
Athlete	Event	Time	Time	Time	Rank
Stefan Georgiev	Giant Slalom	1:18.01	1:15.00	2:33.01	38
Stefan Georgiev	Slalom	DNF	–	DNF	–
Angel Pumpalov	Slalom	53.72	58.21	1:51.93	23

Men's combined

Athlete	Downhill	Slalom		Total	
Athlete	Time	Time 1	Time 2	Total time	Rank
Angel Pumpalov	DSQ	–	–	DSQ	–
Stefan Georgiev	1:44.25	49.63	55.51	3:29.39	16

Women

Athlete	Event	Race 1	Race 2	Total	
Athlete	Event	Time	Time	Time	Rank
Nadejda Vassileva	Giant Slalom	1:22.89	1:21.54	2:44.43	42
Nadejda Vassileva	Slalom	59.59	59.45	1:59.04	28

== Biathlon ==
Men

Event	Athlete	Misses ^{1}	Time	Rank
10 km sprint	Georgi Kasabov	1	27:55.8	60
12.5 km pursuit ^{2}	Georgi Kasabov	7	40:38.5	56

Event	Athlete	Time	Misses	Adjusted time ^{3}	Rank
20 km	Georgi Kasabov	55:16.1	4	59:16.1	65

Women

Event	Athlete	Misses ^{1}	Time	Rank
7.5 km sprint	Iva Karagiozova-Shkodreva	1	23:18.0	41
7.5 km sprint	Pavlina Filipova	1	22:20.6	17
7.5 km sprint	Ekaterina Dafovska	2	22:17.7	15
7.5 km sprint	Irina Nikulchina	2	21:57.0	11
10 km pursuit ^{4}	Pavlina Filipova	2	32:35.1	12
10 km pursuit ^{4}	Ekaterina Dafovska	2	32:22.6	10
10 km pursuit ^{4}	Irina Nikulchina	2	31:15.8	3rd place, bronze medalist(s)

Event	Athlete	Time	Misses	Adjusted time ^{3}	Rank
15 km	Irina Nikulchina	47:16.7	6	53:16.7	43
15 km	Iva Karagiozova-Shkodreva	49:59.3	2	51:59.3	32
15 km	Pavlina Filipova	47:47.5	3	50:47.5	20
15 km	Ekaterina Dafovska	47:15.5	1	48:15.5	5

Women's 4 × 7.5 km relay

Athletes	Race		
Athletes	Misses ^{1}	Time	Rank
Pavlina Filipova; Irina Nikulchina; Iva Karagiozova-Shkodreva; Ekaterina Dafovska	0	1'29:25.8	4

^{1} A penalty loop of 150 metres had to be skied per missed target.
^{2} Starting delay based on 10 km sprint results.
^{3} One minute added per missed target.
^{4} Starting delay based on 7.5 km sprint results.

== Bobsleigh ==
Men

Sled	Athletes	Event	Run 1		Run 2		Run 3		Run 4		Total	
Sled	Athletes	Event	Time	Rank	Time	Rank	Time	Rank	Time	Rank	Time	Rank
BUL-1	Miroslav Danov; Stefan Vasilev	Two-man	49.77	36	49.35	32	49.48	31	49.42	33	3:18.02	32

== Cross-country skiing ==
Men

Sprint

Athlete	Qualifying round		Quarter finals		Semi finals		Finals	
Athlete	Time	Rank	Time	Rank	Time	Rank	Time	Final rank
Ivan Bayrakov	3:18.97	62	did not advance					
Slavcho Batinkov	3:14.21	59	did not advance					

Pursuit

Athlete	10 km C		10 km F pursuit^{1}	
Athlete	Time	Rank	Time	Final rank
Slavcho Batinkov	32:12.6	72	did not advance	
Ivan Bayrakov	31:17.1	70	did not advance	

Event	Athlete	Race	
Event	Athlete	Time	Rank
15 km C	Slavcho Batinkov	DNF	–
15 km C	Ivan Bayrakov	45:41.2	60

^{1} Starting delay based on 10 km C. results.
C = Classical style, F = Freestyle

== Figure skating ==
Men

Athlete	Points	SP	FS	Rank
Ivan Dinev	20.0	12	14	13

Ice Dancing

Athletes	Points	CD1	CD2	OD	FD	Rank
Albena Denkova; Maxim Staviyski	14.0	7	7	7	7	7

== Short track speed skating ==
Men

Athlete	Event	Round one		Quarter finals		Semi finals		Finals	
Athlete	Event	Time	Rank	Time	Rank	Time	Rank	Time	Final rank
Asen Pandov	500 m	1:17.124	4	did not advance					
Miroslav Boyadzhiev	500 m	43.462	4	did not advance					
Miroslav Boyadzhiev	1000 m	1:32.421	4	did not advance					
Kiril Pandov	1000 m	1:31.842	4	did not advance					
Kiril Pandov	1500 m	2:27.730	5	did not advance					
Miroslav Boyadzhiev	1500 m	2:22.082	3 Q			2:23.468	4 QB	2:29.307	11

Women

Athlete	Event	Round one		Quarter finals		Semi finals		Finals	
Athlete	Event	Time	Rank	Time	Rank	Time	Rank	Time	Final rank
Marina Georgieva-Nikolova	500 m	45.916	2 Q	46.422	4	did not advance			
Evgeniya Radanova	500 m	45.195	2 Q	44.780	1 Q	44.686	1 QF	44.252	2nd place, silver medalist(s)
Evgeniya Radanova	1000 m	1:49.496	1 Q	1:36.727	2 Q	1:35.607	4 QB	1:34.702	5
Anna Krasteva	1000 m	1:39.195	3	did not advance					
Evgeniya Radanova	1500 m	2:32.821	1 Q			2:31.194	2 QF	2:31.723	3rd place, bronze medalist(s)
Marina Georgieva-Nikolova	1500 m	2:33.362	4	did not advance					
Evgeniya Radanova; Marina Georgieva-Nikolova; Anna Krasteva; Daniela Vlaeva	3000 m relay					4:25.877	3 QB	4:20.703	6

== Ski jumping ==
Athlete	Event	Qualifying jump			Final jump 1			Final jump 2		Total	
Athlete	Event	Distance	Points	Rank	Distance	Points	Rank	Distance	Points	Points	Rank
Georgi Zharkov	Normal hill	73.5	76.5	45	did not advance						
Georgi Zharkov	Large hill	101.0	75.3	39	did not advance						
