= Mark Gee =

Mark Gee may refer to:

- Mark Gee (biathlete) (born 1972), British biathlete
- Mark Gee (scientist), British scientist
