= Snowboarding at the 2002 Winter Olympics – Men's parallel giant slalom =

Men's parallel giant slalom at the XIX Olympic Winter Games
- Venue: Park City
- Date: 14–15 February 2002
- Competitors: 32 from 10 nations

Medalists
1st place, gold medalist(s)		Philipp Schoch	Switzerland
2nd place, silver medalist(s)		Richard Richardsson	Sweden
3rd place, bronze medalist(s)		Chris Klug	United States

The men's parallel giant slalom event in snowboarding at the 2002 Winter Olympics was held in Park City, United States. The qualification runs were held on 14 February and the final rounds on 15 February.

== Medalists ==
Gold	Philipp Schoch; Switzerland
Silver	Richard Richardsson; Sweden
Bronze	Chris Klug; United States

== Qualification ==
The top 16 racers, based on their qualification time, advanced to the elimination rounds.

Rank	Bib	Name	Nationality	1st run (time)	Rank	2nd run (time)	Rank	Total time
1	10	Gilles Jaquet	Switzerland	15.88	1	19.81	3	35.69
2	7	Alexander Maier	Austria	16.60	5	19.68	1	36.28
3	5	Daniel Biveson	Sweden	16.47	3	19.95	6	36.42
4	6	Richard Richardsson	Sweden	16.85	13	19.73	2	36.58
5	2	Dejan Kosir	Slovenia	16.84	12	19.87	4	36.71
6	26	Jérôme Sylvestre	Canada	16.08	2	20.78	19	36.86
7	4	Mathieu Bozzetto	France	16.61	7	20.29	9	36.90
8	12	Sigfried Grabner	Austria	16.60	5	20.34	11	36.94
9	16	Stefan Kaltschütz	Austria	16.64	8	20.33	10	36.97
10	9	Dieter Krassnig	Austria	16.50	4	20.52	13	37.02
11	1	Chris Klug	United States	17.24	20	19.93	5	37.17
12	3	Stephen Copp	Sweden	17.06	16	20.16	7	37.22
13	17	Mathias Behounek	Germany	16.72	9	20.59	16	37.31
14	11	Walter Feichter	Italy	17.10	17	20.23	8	37.33
15	29	Philipp Schoch	Switzerland	16.72	9	20.62	17	37.34
16	14	Nicolas Huet	France	16.83	11	20.66	18	37.49
17	22	Mark Fawcett	Canada	16.94	14	20.59	16	37.53
18	15	Markus Ebner	Germany	16.98	15	20.66	18	37.64
19	32	Roland Fischnaller	Italy	17.15	19	20.55	14	37.70
20	21	Jeff Greenwood	United States	17.37	23	20.47	12	37.84
21	8	Christophe Segura	France	17.28	21	20.78	19	38.06
22	31	Kurt Niederstatter	Italy	17.10	17	21.12	23	38.22
23	28	Charlie Cosnier	France	17.43	24	20.98	22	38.41
24	23	Ryan Wedding	Canada	17.64	26	20.97	21	38.61
25	20	Simon Schoch	Switzerland	17.49	25	21.14	24	38.63
26	30	Zeke Steggall	Australia	17.30	22	21.39	26	38.69
27	27	Peter Thorndike	United States	18.02	28	20.83	20	38.85
28	24	Jonas Aspman	Sweden	18.30	29	20.58	15	38.88
29	13	Jasey Jay Anderson	Canada	17.72	27	21.37	25	39.09
-	18	Ueli Kestenholz	Switzerland	DNF	-	-	-	-
-	25	Tomaz Knafelj	Slovenia	DNF	-	-	-	-
-	19	Simone Salvati	Italy	DSQ	-	-	-	-

== Elimination round ==
In the elimination round, each head-to-head contest consists of two runs. If one competitor wins both runs, that competitor advances. If the runs are split, the racer with the overall fastest time advances.

1/8 finals
1	Jaquet (SUI)	DSQ
16	Huet (FRA)
8	Grabner (AUT)
9	Kaltschütz (AUT)	+1.57
5	Kosir (SLO)
12	Copp (SWE)	+2.12
4	Richardsson (SWE)
13	Behounek (GER)	+1.24
3	Biveson (SWE)	+0.00*
14	Feichter (ITA)
6	Sylvestre (CAN)	+0.05
11	Klug (USA)
7	Bozzetto (FRA)
10	Krassnig (AUT)	+2.24
2	Maier (AUT)	DSQ
15	Schoch (SUI)

Quarterfinals
16	Huet (FRA)
8	Grabner (AUT)	DSQ
5	Kosir (SLO)	+2.45
4	Richardsson (SWE)
14	Feichter (ITA)	+1.03
11	Klug (USA)
7	Bozzetto (FRA)	DSQ
15	Schoch (SUI)

Semifinals
16	Huet (FRA)	DSQ
4	Richardsson (SWE)
11	Klug (USA)	DSQ
15	Schoch (SUI)

Finals
4	Richardsson (SWE)	DSQ
15	Schoch (SUI)
Third place
16	Huet (FRA)
11	Klug (USA)

* In a tie, the winner of the second run advances.
