= Great Britain at the 2002 Winter Olympics =

- Flag of the United Kingdom
- IOC code: GBR
- NOC: British Olympic Association

in Salt Lake City
- Competitors: 49 (31 men, 18 women) in 11 sports
- Flag bearers: Mike Dixon (opening) (biathlon); Rhona Martin (closing) (curling)
- Medals Ranked 18th: Gold 1 Silver 0 Bronze 1 Total 2

Winter Olympics appearances (overview)
- 1924; 1928; 1932; 1936; 1948; 1952; 1956; 1960; 1964; 1968; 1972; 1976; 1980; 1984; 1988; 1992; 1994; 1998; 2002; 2006; 2010; 2014; 2018; 2022; 2026

The United Kingdom of Great Britain and Northern Ireland competed as Great Britain at the 2002 Winter Olympics in Salt Lake City, United States.

== Medallists ==
| Medal | Name | Sport | Event |
|---|---|---|---|
| Gold | Rhona Martin; Deborah Knox; Fiona MacDonald; Janice Rankin; Margaret Morton | Curling | Women's competition |
| Bronze | Alex Coomber | Skeleton | Women's individual |

Alain Baxter came third in the Men's slalom but was subsequently disqualified for use of a stimulant. Baxter's claim that a mix up in the ingredients of the same branded cold medication between the UK and the US was the cause of the ingestion of the stimulant was accepted, and as a result he received the minimum ban of 3 months.

== Alpine skiing ==
Men

| Athlete | Event | Race 1 | Race 2 | Total | |
| Athlete | Event | Time | Time | Time | Rank |
|---|---|---|---|---|---|
| Ross Green | Giant Slalom | 1:15.90 | 1:13.41 | 2:29.31 | 29 |
| Alain Baxter | Slalom | DSQ | – | DSQ | – |
| Gareth Trayner | Slalom | 54.48 | 56.33 | 1:50.91 | 22 |
| Noel Baxter | Slalom | 53.66 | 55.98 | 1:49.64 | 20 |

Men's combined

| Athlete | Downhill | Slalom | | Total | |
| Athlete | Time | Time 1 | Time 2 | Total time | Rank |
|---|---|---|---|---|---|
| Ross Green | 1:43.30 | 49.97 | 55.84 | 3:29.11 | 15 |

Women

| Athlete | Event | Race 1 | Race 2 | Total | |
| Athlete | Event | Time | Time | Time | Rank |
|---|---|---|---|---|---|
| Chemmy Alcott | Downhill | | | 1:45.98 | 32 |
| Chemmy Alcott | Super-G | | | 1:17.34 | 28 |
| Chemmy Alcott | Giant Slalom | 1:20.25 | 1:18.22 | 2:38.47 | 30 |
| Chemmy Alcott | Slalom | DNF | – | DNF | – |
| Emma Carrick-Anderson | Slalom | 56.25 | 57.54 | 1:53.79 | 19 |

Women's combined

| Athlete | Downhill | Slalom | | Total | |
| Athlete | Time | Time 1 | Time 2 | Total time | Rank |
|---|---|---|---|---|---|
| Chemmy Alcott | 1:19.06 | 47.27 | 45.01 | 2:51.34 | 14 |

== Biathlon ==
Men

| Event | Athlete | Misses ^{1} | Time | Rank |
|---|---|---|---|---|
| 10 km sprint | Mike Dixon | 1 | 28:58.7 | 74 |
| 10 km sprint | Mark Gee | 2 | 28:57.8 | 72 |
| 10 km sprint | Jason Sklenar | 4 | 28:43.4 | 71 |

| Event | Athlete | Time | Misses | Adjusted time ^{3} | Rank |
|---|---|---|---|---|---|
| 20 km | Mark Gee | 57:10.2 | 5 | 1'02:10.2 | 81 |
| 20 km | Mike Dixon | 57:04.9 | 5 | 1'02:04.9 | 79 |
| 20 km | Jason Sklenar | 54:27.2 | 3 | 57:27.2 | 48 |

Men's 4 × 7.5 km relay

| Athletes | Race | | |
| Athletes | Misses ^{1} | Time | Rank |
|---|---|---|---|
| Jason Sklenar; Mark Gee; Mike Dixon; Hugh Pritchard | 0 | 1'36:06.0 | 19 |

^{1} A penalty loop of 150 metres had to be skied per missed target.
^{3} One minute added per missed target.

== Bobsleigh ==
Men

| Sled | Athletes | Event | Run 1 | | Run 2 | | Run 3 | | Run 4 | | Total | |
| Sled | Athletes | Event | Time | Rank | Time | Rank | Time | Rank | Time | Rank | Time | Rank |
|---|---|---|---|---|---|---|---|---|---|---|---|---|
| GBR-1 | Marcus Adam; Lee Johnston | Two-man | 48.04 | 10 | 48.16 | 13 | 48.05 | 10 | 48.02 | 10 | 3:12.27 | 10 |
| GBR-2 | Colin Bryce; Neil Scarisbrick | Two-man | 48.44 | 23 | 48.46 | 22 | 48.72 | 26 | 48.50 | 21 | 3:14.12 | 22 |

| Sled | Athletes | Event | Run 1 | | Run 2 | | Run 3 | | Run 4 | | Total | |
| Sled | Athletes | Event | Time | Rank | Time | Rank | Time | Rank | Time | Rank | Time | Rank |
|---|---|---|---|---|---|---|---|---|---|---|---|---|
| GBR-1 | Neil Scarisbrick; Scott Rider; Philip Goedluck; Dean Ward | Four-man | 47.09 | 13 | 47.05 | 13 | 47.44 | 9 | 47.79 | 12 | 3:09.37 | 11 |
| GBR-2 | Lee Johnston; Phil Harries; David McCalla; Paul Attwood | Four-man | 47.06 | 12 | 47.32 | 19 | 47.41 | 7 | 47.98 | 16 | 3:09.77 | 14 |

Women

| Sled | Athletes | Event | Run 1 | | Run 2 | | Total | |
| Sled | Athletes | Event | Time | Rank | Time | Rank | Time | Rank |
|---|---|---|---|---|---|---|---|---|
| GBR-1 | Cheryl Done; Nicola Minichiello | Two-woman | 50.10 | 13 | 49.79 | 12 | 1:39.89 | 12 |
| GBR-2 | Michelle Coy; Jackie Davies | Two-woman | 49.77 | 11 | 49.78 | 11 | 1:39.55 | 11 |

== Curling ==
=== Men's tournament ===
==== Group stage ====
Top four teams advanced to semi-finals.

| Country | Skip | W | L |
|---|---|---|---|
| Canada | Kevin Martin | 8 | 1 |
| Norway | Pål Trulsen | 7 | 2 |
| Switzerland | Andreas Schwaller | 6 | 3 |
| Sweden | Peja Lindholm | 6 | 3 |
| Finland | Markku Uusipaavalniemi | 5 | 4 |
| Germany | Sebastian Stock | 4 | 5 |
| Denmark | Ulrik Schmidt | 3 | 6 |
| (United Kingdom) Great Britain 8th | Hammy McMillan | 3 | 6 |
| United States | Tim Somerville | 3 | 6 |
| France | Dominique Dupont-Roc | 0 | 9 |

| Team 1 | Score | Team 2 |
|---|---|---|
| Canada | 6–4 | Great Britain |
| Sweden | 7–2 | Great Britain |
| Great Britain | 6–7 | Norway |
| Great Britain | 7–6 | Germany |
| Great Britain | 4–6 | Finland |
| Great Britain | 5–6 | Denmark |
| Switzerland | 10–4 | Great Britain |
| France | 3–7 | Great Britain |
| Great Britain | 7–6 | United States |

Contestants

Great Britain
Stranraer CC, Stranraer

Skip: Hammy McMillan*
Third: Warwick Smith
Second: Ewan MacDonald
Lead: Peter Loudon
Alternate: Norman Brown

* Hammy McMillan was replaced by Warwick Smith as skip after Draw 4.

=== Women's tournament ===
==== Group stage ====
Top four teams advanced to semi-finals.

| Country | Skip | W | L |
|---|---|---|---|
| Canada | Kelley Law | 8 | 1 |
| Switzerland | Luzia Ebnöther | 7 | 2 |
| United States | Kari Erickson | 6 | 3 |
| (United Kingdom) Great Britain | Rhona Martin | 5 | 4 |
| Germany | Natalie Neßler | 5 | 4 |
| Sweden | Elisabet Gustafson | 5 | 4 |
| Norway | Dordi Nordby | 4 | 5 |
| Japan | Akiko Katoh | 2 | 7 |
| Denmark | Lene Bidstrup | 2 | 7 |
| Russia | Olga Jarkova | 1 | 8 |

| Team 1 | Score | Team 2 |
|---|---|---|
| United Kingdom | 10–6 | Norway |
| Sweden | 7–4 | United Kingdom |
| United Kingdom | 9–1 | Japan |
| Russia | 5–8 | United Kingdom |
| Canada | 9–4 | United Kingdom |
| United Kingdom | 7–4 | Switzerland |
| United Kingdom | 8–6 | Denmark |
| United Kingdom | 5–6 | United States |
| United Kingdom | 5–7 | Germany |

Tie-breaker 1

| Team 1 | Score | Team 2 |
|---|---|---|
| Sweden | 4–6 | United Kingdom |

Tie-breaker 2

| Team 1 | Score | Team 2 |
|---|---|---|
| United Kingdom | 9–5 | Germany |

==== Medal round ====
Semi-final

| Sheet D | 1 | 2 | 3 | 4 | 5 | 6 | 7 | 8 | 9 | 10 | Final |
|---|---|---|---|---|---|---|---|---|---|---|---|
| Great Britain (Martin) | 0 | 0 | 1 | 2 | 0 | 0 | 2 | 0 | 0 | 1 | 6 |
| Canada (Law) 🔨 | 1 | 0 | 0 | 0 | 1 | 1 | 0 | 1 | 1 | 0 | 5 |

Gold medal game

| Sheet C | 1 | 2 | 3 | 4 | 5 | 6 | 7 | 8 | 9 | 10 | Final |
|---|---|---|---|---|---|---|---|---|---|---|---|
| Switzerland (Ebnöther) | 0 | 0 | 0 | 1 | 0 | 0 | 0 | 1 | 1 | 0 | 3 |
| Great Britain (Martin) 🔨 (gold) | 0 | 0 | 0 | 0 | 2 | 0 | 1 | 0 | 0 | 1 | 4 |

Contestants

Great Britain
Greenacres CC, Howwood

Skip: Rhona Martin
Third: Deborah Knox
Second: Fiona MacDonald
Lead: Janice Rankin
Alternate: Margaret Morton

== Figure skating ==
Ice Dancing

| Athletes | Points | CD1 | CD2 | OD | FD | Rank |
|---|---|---|---|---|---|---|
| Marika Humphreys; Vitali Baranov | 30.4 | 16 | 16 | 15 | 15 | 15 |

== Freestyle skiing ==
Men

| Athlete | Event | Qualification | | | Final | | |
| Athlete | Event | Time | Points | Rank | Time | Points | Rank |
|---|---|---|---|---|---|---|---|
| Sam Temple | Moguls | 51.10 | 9.03 | 29 | did not advance | | |

Women

| Athlete | Event | Qualification | | | Final | | |
| Athlete | Event | Time | Points | Rank | Time | Points | Rank |
|---|---|---|---|---|---|---|---|
| Laura Donaldson | Moguls | 43.57 | 18.41 | 29 | did not advance | | |
| Joanne Bromfield | Moguls | 45.48 | 18.75 | 28 | did not advance | | |

== Luge ==
Men

| Athlete | Run 1 | | Run 2 | | Run 3 | | Run 4 | | Total | |
| Athlete | Time | Rank | Time | Rank | Time | Rank | Time | Rank | Time | Rank |
|---|---|---|---|---|---|---|---|---|---|---|
| Mark Hatton | 45.391 | 24 | 45.509 | 27 | 45.107 | 26 | 45.559 | 25 | 3:01.566 | 25 |

== Short track speed skating ==
Men

| Athlete | Event | Round one | | Quarter-finals | | Semi-finals | | Finals | |
| Athlete | Event | Time | Rank | Time | Rank | Time | Rank | Time | Final rank |
|---|---|---|---|---|---|---|---|---|---|
| Dave Allardice | 500 m | 42.980 | 3 | did not advance | | | | | |
| Leon Flack | 500 m | 43.965 | 3 | did not advance | | | | | |
| Leon Flack | 1000 m | 1:29.584 | 2 Q | 1:28.604 | 4 | did not advance | | | |
| Nicky Gooch | 1000 m | 1:38.034 | 4 | did not advance | | | | | |
| Nicky Gooch | 1500 m | 2:27.084 | 3 Q | | | 2:25.903 | 5 | did not advance | |
| Leon Flack | 1500 m | 2:25.832 | 4 | did not advance | | | | | |

Women

| Athlete | Event | Round one | | Quarter-finals | | Semi-finals | | Finals | |
| Athlete | Event | Time | Rank | Time | Rank | Time | Rank | Time | Final rank |
|---|---|---|---|---|---|---|---|---|---|
| Jo Williams | 500 m | 46.631 | 3 | did not advance | | | | | |
| Sarah Lindsay | 500 m | 45.641 | 1 Q | 44.912 | 3 | did not advance | | | |
| Sarah Lindsay | 1000 m | 1:42.157 | 2 Q | 1:36.753 | 3 | did not advance | | | |
| Jo Williams | 1000 m | 1:39.672 | 1 Q | 1:34.373 | 4 | did not advance | | | |
| Jo Williams | 1500 m | 2:27.845 | 4 | did not advance | | | | | |
| Sarah Lindsay | 1500 m | 3:01.223 | 5 | did not advance | | | | | |

== Skeleton ==
Men

| Athlete | Run 1 | | Run 2 | | Total | |
| Athlete | Time | Rank | Time | Rank | Time | Rank |
|---|---|---|---|---|---|---|
| Kristan Bromley | 52.17 | 19 | 51.26 | 6 | 1:43.43 | 13 |

Women

| Athlete | Run 1 | | Run 2 | | Total | |
| Athlete | Time | Rank | Time | Rank | Time | Rank |
|---|---|---|---|---|---|---|
| Alex Coomber | 52.48 | 3 | 52.89 | 3 | 1:45.37 | 3rd place, bronze medalist(s) |

== Ski jumping ==
| Athlete | Event | Qualifying jump | | | Final jump 1 | | | Final jump 2 | | Total | |
| Athlete | Event | Distance | Points | Rank | Distance | Points | Rank | Distance | Points | Points | Rank |
|---|---|---|---|---|---|---|---|---|---|---|---|
| Glynn Pedersen | Normal hill | 78.5 | 88.0 | 43 | did not advance | | | | | | |
| Glynn Pedersen | Large hill | 91.0 | 56.3 | 48 | did not advance | | | | | | |

== Snowboarding ==
Women's halfpipe

| Athlete | Qualifying round 1 | | Qualifying round 2 | | Final | |
| Athlete | Points | Rank | Points | Rank | Points | Rank |
|---|---|---|---|---|---|---|
| Lesley McKenna | 12.5 | 23 | 25.63 | 11 | did not advance | |
