= Peter Thorndike =

American snowboarder (born 1977)

Personal information
- Born: October 4, 1977 (age 48) Concord, New Hampshire, U.S.

Sport
- Sport: Snowboarding

Peter Thorndike (born October 4, 1977) is an American snowboarder. He competed in the men's parallel giant slalom event at the 2002 Winter Olympics, scoring 27th place in the event.
