= Ryan Wedding =

Canadian snowboarder and alleged drug trafficker (born 1981)

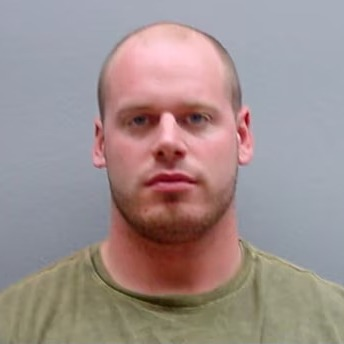
- A photograph of Wedding posted by the Embassy of the United States, Mexico City, in 2025

FBI Ten Most Wanted Fugitive
- Charges: Conspiracy to distribute and possess with intent to distribute controlled substances; Conspiracy to export cocaine; Continuing criminal enterprise; Murder in connection with a continuing criminal enterprise and drug crime; Attempt to commit murder in connection with a continuing criminal enterprise and drug crime
- Alias: James Conrad King, Jesse King, "Giant", "Public Enemy", "El Jefe"

Description
- Born: Ryan James Wedding; September 14, 1981 (age 45); Thunder Bay, Ontario, Canada
- Gender: Male
- Height: 1.91 m (6 ft 3 in)
- Weight: 109 kg (240 lb)
- Occupation: Former Olympic snowboarder

Status
- Added: March 6, 2025
- Caught: January 22, 2026
- Captured

Ryan James Wedding (born September 14, 1981) is a Canadian former Olympic snowboarder and alleged drug lord. He represented Canada at the 2002 Winter Olympics in the men's parallel giant slalom event. After retiring from snowboarding, he allegedly became an international drug trafficker. On March 6, 2025, he was added to the FBI Ten Most Wanted Fugitives list. He was arrested on January 22, 2026, in Mexico City, Mexico, and subsequently extradited to Southern California to face trial in the United States.

== Early life ==
Ryan James Wedding was born on September 14, 1981, in Thunder Bay, Ontario, the eldest of three children. His maternal grandparents owned the Mount Baldy ski resort in Thunder Bay. His uncle was the director of a ski school and coach of the Canadian women's National Alpine Ski Team. His father was an engineer and former competitive skier who, when Ryan was 12, moved his family to the Greater Vancouver suburb of Coquitlam, British Columbia, which is where Ryan began his snowboarding career.

== Snowboarding ==
Wedding won the first snowboarding race he entered and, at 15, made the Canadian National Ski Team. He won a bronze medal in the parallel giant slalom event at the 1999 Junior World Championship and a silver medal in the 2001 Junior World Championships. At the 2002 Winter Olympics in Salt Lake City, he competed for Team Canada in snowboarding men's parallel giant slalom, where he finished in twenty-fourth place. After this, he gave up competitive snowboarding.

== Legal issues ==
=== Marijuana farm ===
After the 2002 Winter Olympics, Wedding moved back to Vancouver and attended Simon Fraser University. He developed an interest in bodybuilding and started working as a bouncer. After two years in university, he dropped out and began to speculate in real estate, which he financed by growing marijuana at a 6,800-plant warehouse on a suburban property called Eighteen Carrot Farms. In 2006, the RCMP raided the farm and found a shotgun, ammunition, and $10 million worth of cannabis. Wedding was not on the property at the time and there was not enough evidence to charge him.

=== Cocaine conviction ===
Wedding expanded his operation when he joined up with Iranian and Russian cocaine smugglers. In 2010, he was convicted of attempting to buy cocaine from a U.S. government agent in 2008, for which he was sentenced to four years in prison. He was released in 2011, and around that time he allegedly began his criminal enterprise.

=== Alleged drug lord ===
A wanted poster for Wedding released by the FBI

On October 17, 2024, Wedding was charged by the U.S. Department of Justice with "leading a transnational organized crime group that engaged in cocaine trafficking and murder, including of innocent civilians". He is charged with multiple felonies, including drug trafficking, leading a criminal organization, three counts of murder, and one attempt to commit murder. He was one of sixteen people to be charged as part of Operation Giant Slalom in a joint investigation by several federal agencies. The murders that Wedding is accused of having carried out were of married couple Jagtar Sidhu, 57, and Harbhajan Sidhu, 55, and of Mohammed Zafar, 39. The Sidhus were killed in November 2023, while Zafar was killed in May 2024. Wedding is believed to have ordered the murders alongside Andrew Clark, who has been charged with the April 2024 murder of Randy Fader, 29.

According to authorities, after his release, Wedding fled to Mexico and became a high-ranking member of the Sinaloa Cartel, Mexico's largest drug cartel, where he was known by the nicknames "El Jefe", "Giant" or "Public Enemy". The alleged second-in-command of Wedding's trafficking ring Andrew Clark was arrested in Zapopan, Jalisco, Mexico, in October 2024.

Wedding is accused of having ordered the assassination of former associate turned federal witness Jonathan Acebedo-Garcia in Medellín, Colombia, in January 2025. On March 6, 2025, Wedding was added to the FBI Ten Most Wanted Fugitives list. He replaced Alexis Flores, who at the time was removed from the list without having been captured. Flores was later caught in February 2026. The FBI initially offered a reward of up to US$10 million for Wedding's capture, which increased to US$15 million in November 2025 after Wedding was indicted on charges of witness intimidation, murder, and money laundering. In November 2025, the FBI announced the arrest of six more defendants in the case, including an attorney for Wedding.

=== Arrest and trial ===
Wedding was arrested in Mexico City on the night of January 22, 2026. He was reported to have turned himself over to authorities, however his attorney Anthony Colombo disputed this claim, saying that Wedding was apprehended non-voluntarily. He first appeared in United States federal court on Monday, January 26, 2026, and pleaded not guilty to the charges against him. In September 2026, US District Court Judge Sherilyn Peace Garnett granted a joint request from the prosecution and defense to delay Wedding's trial until October 2027 due to the circumstances of the case being "so unusual and so complex".

== Personal life ==
While incarcerated in 2011, Wedding married an Iranian-born woman. They have since divorced. Wedding reportedly has a girlfriend from Colombia who is accused of accepting money from him with knowledge that it came from drug trafficking.

== In media ==
In March 2025, it was announced that a television documentary series titled Snow King: From Olympian to Narco was in production, based on a Rolling Stone investigation. It is being developed by Rolling Stone Films in collaboration with the production companies Dogwoof, Visitor Media, the CBC, and Corriente del Golfo. In 2026, Ron Chepesiuk, an author of true crime originally from Thunder Bay, signed a contract to write a book about Wedding.

== See also ==
- FBI Ten Most Wanted Fugitives, 2020s
- List of professional sportspeople convicted of crimes
