= German Glessner =

Argentine/German Olympian (born 1974)

Germán Glessner (born 8 March 1974 in Buenos Aires) is an Argentine former skeleton athlete, businessman and sports administrator. He represented Argentina at the 2002 Winter Olympics in Salt Lake City.

Following his athletic career, he became involved in business and sports governance. He serves as president of the Argentine Bobsleigh, Skeleton and Luge Association and as a councillor of the Argentine Olympic Committee.

== Sports ==
Glessner competed in skeleton from 1996 to 2006, representing Argentina at the 2002 Winter Olympics in Salt Lake City.

He was for many years the only South American athlete to compete in skeleton at the Winter Olympics, until Brazilian athlete Nicole Silveira also competed in the discipline at the 2022 Winter Olympics, in a sport historically dominated by athletes from Europe and North America.

He was featured in an ESPN article by Jim Caple, who described him as one of his "athletes of the year" for 2002.

Since 2018, he has been president of the Argentine Bobsleigh, Skeleton and Luge Association (AABSL). The AABSL was re-founded in 1996 by Christian Atance, Claudio Atance and Germán Glessner.

He is a founding member of the Argentine Olympic Athletes Association.

In 2025, Glessner was appointed as a councillor of the Argentine Olympic Committee (COA), representing bobsleigh, skeleton and luge.

== Business career ==
Glessner is the founder and chief executive officer of Glessner Group, established in 2005.

The company initially focused on architectural visualization and later expanded into international projects, working with international architectural firms and real estate developers.

Over time, the group has been involved in advisory, investment and cross-border business initiatives.

The company has contributed to international architectural visualization projects, including work on developments such as VIA 57 West in New York and proposals for the New Mexico City International Airport.
