= Kurt Niederstätter =

Italian snowboarder

Personal information
- Nationality: Italian
- Born: 3 August 1976 (age 48); Brixen, Italy

Sport
- Sport: Snowboarding

Kurt Niederstätter (born 3 August 1976) is an Italian snowboarder. He competed in the men's parallel giant slalom event at the 2002 Winter Olympics.
