= Olga Lazarenko =

Russian freestyle skier

Personal information
- Nationality: Russian
- Born: 7 January 1980 (age 45)

Sport
- Sport: Freestyle skiing

Olga Lazarenko (born 7 January 1980) is a Russian freestyle skier. She competed in the women's moguls event at the 2002 Winter Olympics.
