= Natalia Lovece =

Argentine biathlete (born 1978)

Personal information
- Nationality: Argentine
- Born: 30 March 1978 (age 46)

Sport
- Sport: Biathlon

Natalia Lovece (born 30 March 1978) is an Argentine biathlete. She competed in two events at the 2002 Winter Olympics.
