= Kelly Ringstad =

Canadian freestyle skier

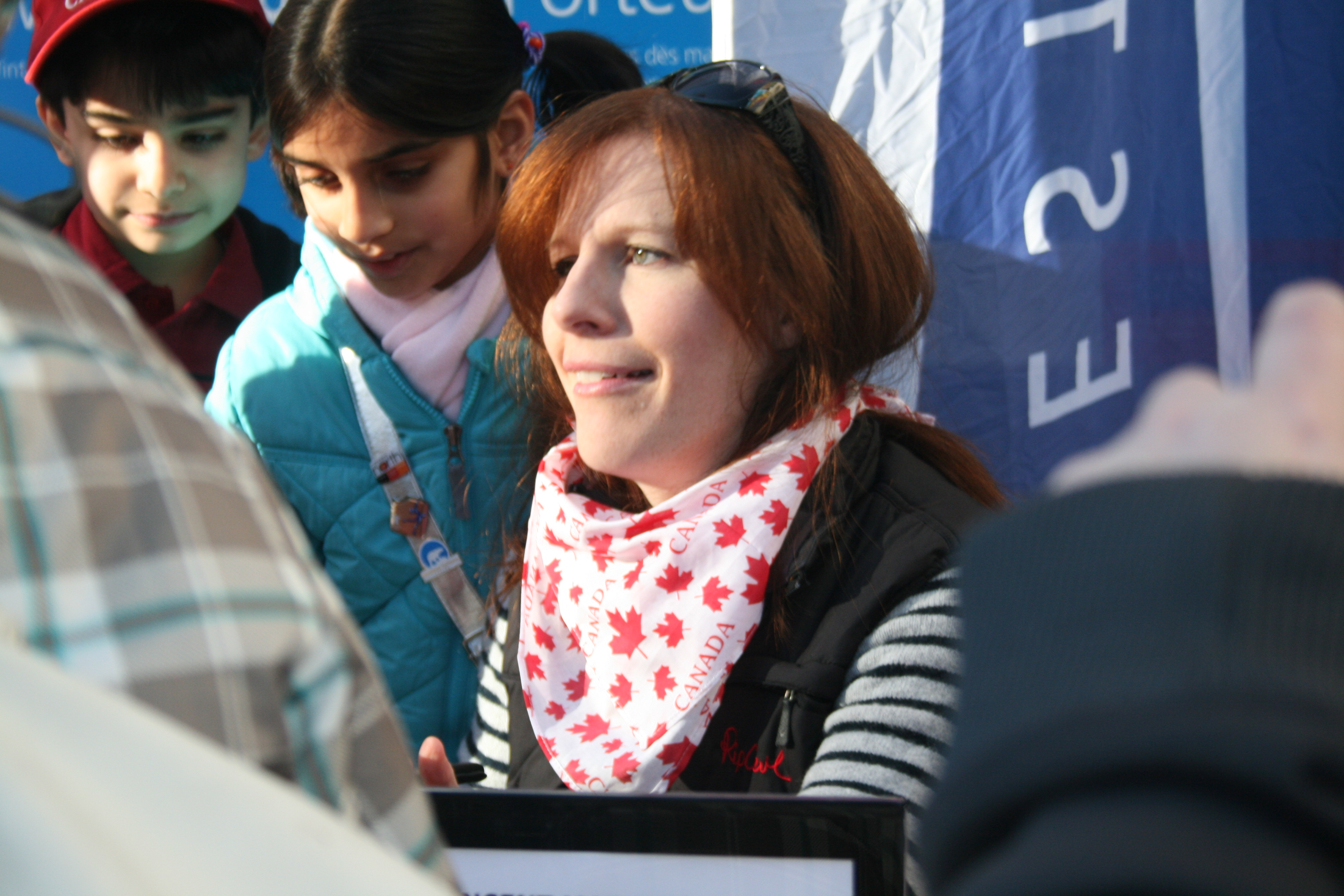

Personal information
- Nationality: Canadian
- Citizenship: Canadian
- Born: 1 March 1974 (age 51) Vancouver, British Columbia, Canada

Sport
- Country: Canada
- Sport: Freestyle skiing

Kelly Ringstad (born 1 March 1974) is a Canadian freestyle skier.

== Biography ==
Ringstad was born in Vancouver, British Columbia on 1 March 1974. She competed at the 2002 Winter Olympics in Salt Lake City, in women's moguls.
