= Maria Kirkova =

Bulgarian alpine skier (born 1986)

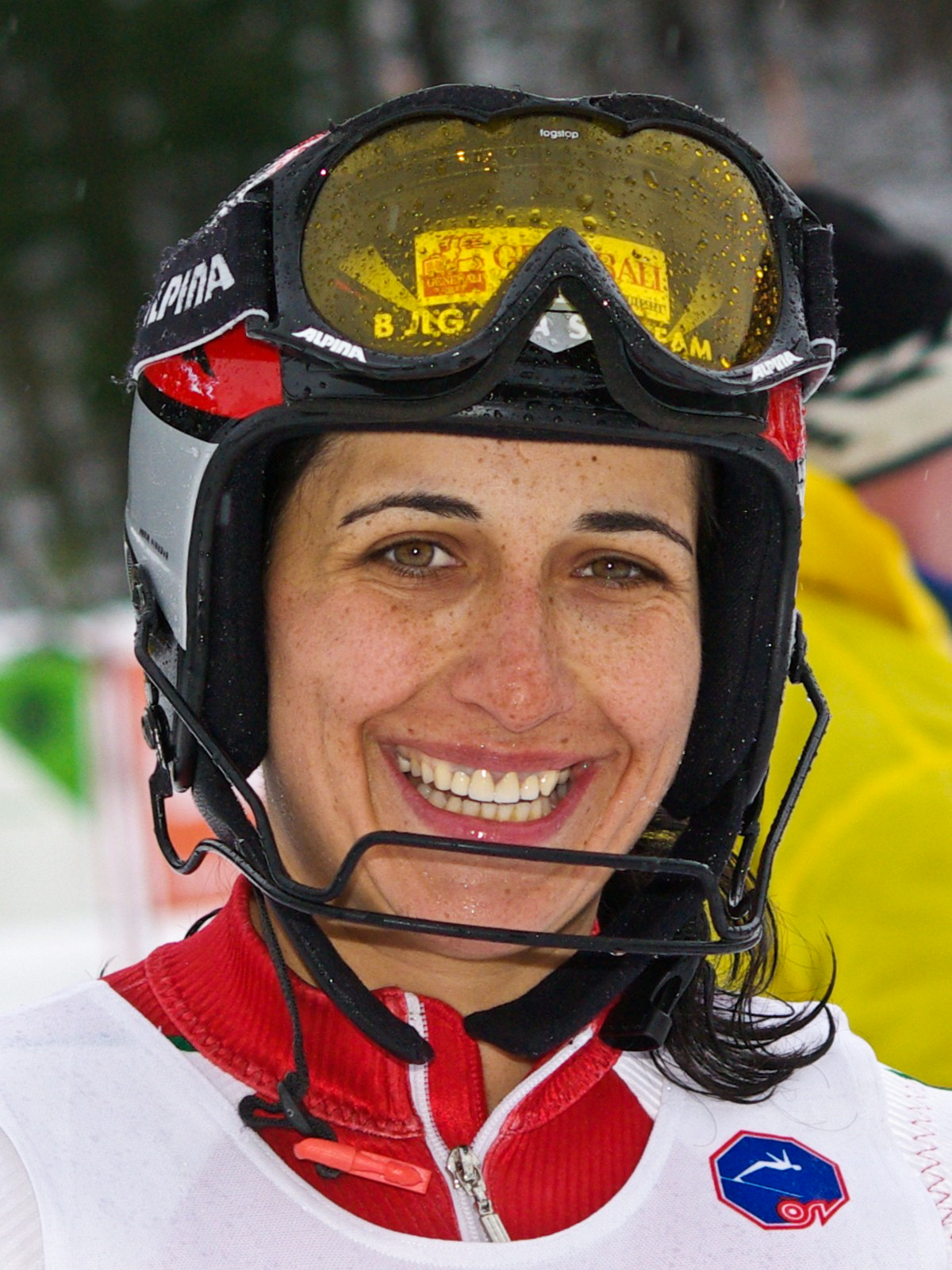

Personal information
- Nickname: Mimi
- Nationality: Bulgarian
- Born: 2 January 1986 (age 40) Sofia, Bulgaria
- Height: 165 cm (5 ft 5 in)
- Weight: 65 kg (143 lb)

Sport
- Country: Bulgaria
- Sport: Alpine skiing
- Event(s): Downhill, super-G, giant slalom, slalom, combined

Achievements and titles
- Olympic finals: 2006 Winter Olympics: Slalom–DNF; 2010 Winter Olympics: Downhill–33; Super-G–DNF; Slalom–DNF; Giant slalom–DNF

Maria Kirkova (Bulgarian: Мария Киркова; born 2 January 1986) is a Bulgarian female skier. She was the flagbearer for Bulgaria and a competitor during the 2014 Winter Olympics and took part in the Alpine skiing events at all four Winter Olympics between 2006 and 2018 as well as the FIS Alpine World Ski Championships in 2003 and six championship from 2007 to 2017.

== Olympic Games ==
Kirkova made her Olympic debut in Slalom during the 2006 Winter Olympics in Turin, but did not finish the course. She then competed in the women's downhill, super-G, slalom and giant slalom in the 2010 Winter Olympics, in all of these she failed to finish, except for the downhill, in which she came 33rd. During the 2014 Winter Olympics, she competed in slalom and giant slalom. She finished 36th in the giant slalom. At the 2018 Winter Olympics she finished 35th in the slalom and 40th in the giant slalom. She also participated at seven world championships between 2003 and 2017.

== Results ==
=== Winter Olympics ===
- 2006 Winter Olympics:
  - Slalom – DNF
- 2010 Winter Olympics:
  - Downhill–33
  - Super-G–DNF
  - Slalom–DNF
  - Giant slalom–DNF
- 2014 Winter Olympics:
  - Slalom–DNF
  - Giant slalom–36
- 2018 Winter Olympics
  - Giant slalom – 40
  - Slalom – 35

=== World Championships ===
- FIS Alpine World Ski Championships 2007:
  - Giant slalom – 44
  - Slalom – 45
  - Super-G – 28
  - Super combined – 22

Year	Age	Slalom	Giant slalom	Super-G	Downhill	Combined
2003	17	43	—	—	—	—
2007	21	45	44	—	—	—
2009	23	DNF1	34	28	—	22
2011	25	DNF1	51	—	—	—
2013	27	46	DNF1	DNS	DNS	DNS
2015	29	DNF1	41	—	—	—
2017	31	45	46	—	—	—

Olympic Games
Preceded by Aleksandra Zhekova	Flagbearer for Bulgaria; Sochi 2014	Succeeded by Radoslav Yankov
