= Jane Sexton =

Australian freestyle skier

Personal information
- Born: 11 August 1978 (age 47) Albury, New South Wales, Australia

Sport
- Country: Australia
- Sport: Freestyle skiing
Medal record
Women's freestyle skiing
Representing Australia

Jane Sexton (born 11 August 1978) is a former Australian freestyle skier who represented Australia at the 2002 Winter Olympics.

Sexton competed internationally in moguls from age 19, first at Valmeinier, France in the European cup in 1998 and then in Switzerland and Germany the following year. Her first world cup appearance was in November 1999 at Tandadalen in Sweden where she finished 29th. In the same season she competed in world cup events in Canada and the USA. In the 2000–01 season she competed in world cup events in France, Canada, the US and Japan, while in 2001 she competed in the world ski championships in Whistler, Canada in 2001.

Sexton competed at the 2002 Winter Olympics in women's moguls, finishing in 25th place.

After the Olympics, Sexton continued to compete nationally and internationally until August 2004.

Sexton married Michael Butko and has three children.
