= Mariya Dimova (snowboarder) =

Bulgarian snowboarder

Personal information
- Nationality: Bulgarian
- Born: 29 October 1974 (age 50)

Sport
- Sport: Snowboarding

Mariya Dimova (born 29 October 1974) is a Bulgarian snowboarder. She competed in the women's giant slalom event at the 1998 Winter Olympics.
