= Nicolás Arsel =

Argentine alpine skier (born 1982)

Personal information
- Born: 9 May 1982 (age 42); Valcheta, Argentina

Sport
- Sport: Alpine skiing

Nicolás Arsel (born 9 May 1982) is an Argentine alpine skier. He competed in three events at the 2002 Winter Olympics.
