= Valentina Peychinova =

Bulgarian biathlete (born 1977)

Personal information
- Nationality: Bulgarian
- Born: 24 April 1977 (age 47)

Sport
- Sport: Biathlon

Valentina Peychinova (Bulgarian: Валентина Пейчинова, born 24 April 1977) is a Bulgarian biathlete. She competed in the women's relay event at the 1998 Winter Olympics.
