= Joanne Bromfield =

British freestyle skier

Personal information
- Nationality: British
- Born: 12 October 1982 (age 42); Lurgan, Northern Ireland

Sport
- Sport: Freestyle skiing

Joanne Bromfield (born 12 October 1982) is a British freestyle skier. She competed in the women's moguls event at the 2002 Winter Olympics.
