= Agustín García (skier) =

Argentine alpine skier (born 1980)

Personal information
- Born: 6 April 1980 (age 44); San Carlos de Bariloche, Argentina

Sport
- Sport: Alpine skiing

Agustín García (born 6 April 1980) is an Argentine alpine skier. He competed in two events at the 2002 Winter Olympics.
