= Laura Donaldson =

British freestyle skier (born 1972)

Personal information
- Born: 12 January 1972 (age 53); Glasgow, Scotland
- Height: 169 cm (5 ft 7 in)
- Weight: 64 kg (141 lb)
- Website: www.lauradonaldson.org

Sport
- Sport: Freestyle skiing

Laura Donaldson (born 12 January 1972) is a British freestyle skier. She competed in the women's moguls event at the 2002 Winter Olympics.

== Career ==
Donaldson made her Winter Olympics debut at 2002 Winter Olympics at Salt Lake City. She was selected for the team late after some qualifying events were cancelled. She completed in women's moguls event, finished 29th. She has skied at Europa Cup, World Cup, and Nor-Am Cup competitions.
