= Neil Scarisbrick =

British bobsledder

Personal information
- Nationality: British
- Born: 6 June 1970 (age 54); Devizes, England

Sport
- Sport: Bobsleigh

Neil Scarisbrick (born 6 June 1970) is a British bobsledder. He competed in the two man and the four man events at the 2002 Winter Olympics.
