= Yelena Vorona =

Russian freestyle skier

Personal information
- Nationality: Russian
- Born: 3 December 1976 (age 48); Moscow, Russia

Sport
- Sport: Freestyle skiing

Yelena Vorona (born 3 December 1976) is a Russian freestyle skier. She competed at the 1998 Winter Olympics and the 2002 Winter Olympics.
