= Mark Gee (scientist) =

British materials scientist

Mark Gee FInstP FIMMM
- Education: University of Oxford
- Awards: Donald Julius Groen Prize (1992); IMechE Tribology Silver Medal (2003); Tom Bell Surface Engineering Medal (2026)
- Scientific career
- Fields: Tribology, Materials science, Metrology
- Workplaces: National Physical Laboratory; University of Southampton; University of Manchester

Mark Gee is a British scientist specialising in tribology, surface engineering and materials metrology. He is a Fellow of the UK's National Physical Laboratory (NPL) and a visiting professor at the University of Southampton, University of Manchester and Beijing University of Technology. He received the Institution of Mechanical Engineers Tribology Silver Medal in 2003.

== Biography ==
Gee completed a DPhil at the University of Oxford, researching creep crack growth in low-alloy steels, before joining NPL.

His research focuses on friction, wear and the characterisation of engineering materials, particularly ceramics and hardmetals. He has contributed to the development of experimental techniques for measuring wear and relating material microstructure to surface degradation. He has also served on international standards committees, including ASTM G02 on Wear and Erosion and ISO TC 206 on Fine Ceramics.

Gee has chaired the Institute of Physics Tribology Group and served on editorial advisory boards of several scientific journals, including Tribology International. He is a Fellow of the Institute of Physics and the Institute of Materials, Minerals and Mining.

Gee received the Donald Julius Groen Prize for Tribology in 1992, the Institution of Mechanical Engineers Tribology Silver Medal in 2003, and the IOM3 Tom Bell Surface Engineering Medal in 2026. He is also an NPL Fellow in Surface Engineering and Tribology.
