= A. J. Bear =

Australian alpine skier (born 1977)

Personal information
- Born: 2 February 1977 (age 49)
- Occupation: Alpine skier

Sport
- Country: Australia

Skiing career
- Disciplines: Super-G, Downhill, Combined

Aaron J. Bear (born 2 February 1977), known as A. J. Bear, is an Australian former alpine skier who competed in the 2002 and 2006 Winter Olympics.

Bear was a three-time Australian national champion, winning in 1997, 2000, and 2001, along with a National Junior Championship in 2001. With these results, Bear qualified for the 2002 Winter Olympics, competing in the men's downhill, combined, and Super-G events. His best result was 37th in the downhill.

In the three years leading up to 2006 Winter Olympics, Bear sustained injuries that ended his seasons early. A 2003 crash put Bear into a coma, while his 2004 and 2005 World Cup seasons were halted due to knee injuries. Despite that, his performance at the 2005–06 FIS Alpine Ski World Cup was enough for him to qualify for the Super-G event at the 2006 Winter Olympics. He completed one run but not the second, and retired following the Games.

== Results ==
=== Olympic Winter Games ===
As of 23 February 2026

Year	Age							
Year	Age	Slalom	Giant slalom	Super-G	Downhill	Combined	Team combined	Team event
(United States) 2002 Utah	25	—	–	DSQ1	37	DSQ3	—N/a	—N/a
(Italy) 2006 Torino	29	—	–	DNF1	–	–	—N/a	—N/a
