= Maksim Kedrin =

Russian alpine skier (born 1982)

Maksim Kedrin (born 21 September 1982 in Beloretsk) is a Russian former alpine skier who competed in the 2002 Winter Olympics.
