= Stefan Georgiev (skier) =

Bulgarian alpine skier (born 1977)

Stefan Georgiev (Bulgarian: Стефан Георгиев; born 20 May 1977) is an alpine skier from Bulgaria. He competed at the 1998 Winter Olympics, 2002 Winter Olympics, 2006 Winter Olympics and the 2010 Winter Olympics. His best result was a 16th place in the combined in 2002.
