= Glynn Pedersen =

British ski jumper

Personal information
- Nationality: British
- Born: 29 April 1981 (age 43); Thunder Bay, Ontario, Canada

Sport
- Sport: Ski jumping

Glynn Pedersen (born 29 April 1981) is a British ski jumper. He competed in the normal hill and large hill events at the 2002 Winter Olympics. His 14th place in the 2nd tier Continental Cup competition on the normal hill at Ishpeming, Michigan, USA on 19 January 2002 is the highest position achieved by a British jumper at an FIS event. He held the British ski jumping record between September 2001 and April 2017 with a jump of 113.50m. The distance was surpassed by Jake Lock.
