= Jérôme Sylvestre =

Canadian snowboarder

Personal information
- Born: 11 July 1979 (age 45); Greenfield Park, Quebec, Canada

Sport
- Sport: Snowboarding

Jérôme Sylvestre (born 11 July 1979) is a Canadian snowboarder. He competed in the men's parallel giant slalom event at the 2002 Winter Olympics.
