= Gregory Durand =

French speed skater (born 1977)

Personal information
- Nationality: French
- Born: 8 December 1977 (age 47); Montreuil-sous-Bois, France

Sport
- Sport: Short track speed skating

Gregory Durand (born 8 December 1977) is a French former short track speed skater. He competed in two events at the 2002 Winter Olympics.
