= Ross Green =

British alpine skier (born 1978)

Ross Green (born 3 January 1978 in Falkirk) is a British former alpine skier who competed in the 2002 Winter Olympics. Ross was a member of the British Alpine Ski Team from 1993-2004 and was briefly ranked British Number 1 in 2000. He was the British Senior Champion in 1999 at the age of 21. Ross qualified for the 1998 Winter Olympics in Nagano at the age of 19 but was deemed to young to go to the games.

Ross has been the Head Coach of the British Ski Academy, the British U16 & U14 Team, Head Coach of the British VI Paralympic World Cup Team, Director of Coaching at MK Ski. He wrote and developed the UK Coaching Pathway for alpine, snowboard and freeski disciplines for the Home Nation Governing Bodies and BASI.
