= Georgi Zharkov (ski jumper) =

Bulgarian ski jumper

Personal information
- Nationality: Bulgarian
- Born: 10 May 1976 (age 50) Samokov, Bulgaria

Sport
- Sport: Ski jumping

Georgi Zharkov (Bulgarian: Георги Жарков; born 10 May 1976) is a Bulgarian former ski jumper. He competed at the 2002 Winter Olympics and the 2006 Winter Olympics.
