= Daniela Vlaeva =

Bulgarian speed skater

Personal information
- Nationality: Bulgarian
- Born: 7 March 1976 (age 50) Sofia, Bulgaria

Sport
- Sport: Short track speed skating
Medal record
Women's short track speed skating
Representing Bulgaria
World Championships
Bronze medal – third place	1999 Sofia	3000 m relay
Bronze medal – third place	2001 Jeonju	3000 m relay
Bronze medal – third place	2003 Warsaw	3000 m relay

Daniela Vlaeva (born 7 March 1976) is a Bulgarian short track speed skater. She competed at the 1998 Winter Olympics and the 2002 Winter Olympics. Vlaeva has won three bronze medals in 3000 metre relay at the 1999, 2001, and 2003 World Championships, respectively.
