= Naoya Tamura (speed skater) =

Japanese speed skater (born 1979)

Personal information
- Nationality: Japanese
- Born: 18 June 1979 (age 45); Hyogo, Japan

Sport
- Sport: Short track speed skating

Naoya Tamura (田村 直也, Tamura Naoya, born 18 June 1979) is a Japanese short track speed skater. He competed at the 1998 Winter Olympics and the 2002 Winter Olympics.
