= Ivan Baryakov =

Bulgarian cross-country skier (born 1983)

Personal information
- Nationality: Bulgarian
- Born: 26 June 1983 (age 41); Bansko, Bulgaria

Sport
- Sport: Cross-country skiing

Ivan Baryakov (born 26 June 1983) is a Bulgarian former cross-country skier. He competed at the 2002 Winter Olympics and the 2006 Winter Olympics.
