= Mark Gee (biathlete) =

British biathlete (born 1972)

Personal information
- Nationality: British
- Born: 21 February 1972 (age 54) Aviemore, Scotland

Sport
- Sport: Biathlon

Mark Gee (born 21 February 1972) is a British biathlete. He competed at the 1994 Winter Olympics, the 1998 Winter Olympics and the 2002 Winter Olympics.
