= Chris Klug =

American snowboarder

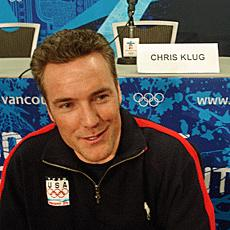
- Klug at the 2010 Winter Olympics

Medal record

Men's snowboarding

Representing United States

Olympic Games
Bronze medal – third place	2002 Salt Lake City	Giant Slalom

Winter X Games
Gold medal – first place	2016 Aspen	Dual Slalom
Gold medal – first place	2018 Aspen	Dual Slalom

Chris Klug (born November 18, 1972) is a professional alpine snowboarder. After receiving a liver transplant in 2000 to treat primary sclerosing cholangitis, he went on to compete in the 2002 Winter Olympics in Salt Lake City, winning a bronze medal in the Parallel Giant Slalom. This was the first and so far only time a transplantee had competed in the Olympics, either winter or summer. He also won a bronze medal, and lit the torch at the 2002 National Kidney Foundation U.S. Transplant Games. He is an alumnus of Deerfield Academy.

In 2004, Klug released a book called To the Edge and Back: My Story from Organ Transplant Survivor to Olympic Snowboarder. He is an active supporter of organ donation and recently founded the Chris Klug Foundation and Donor Dudes to spread awareness of the need for organ donors.

== Personal life ==
Klug is married to Melissa April. They live in Aspen, Colorado and Sisters, Oregon with their two children.

In 2002, he also voiced himself as a one-off guest character in the pilot episode of What's New, Scooby-Doo?

== Chris Klug Foundation ==
In 2003, The Chris Klug Foundation was founded and started by Chris Klug himself, following year after he competed in the Winter Olympics. The start of the foundation was a result on Klug's ambition to help save lives and advertise a healthy, active life after receiving a transplant. The Chris Klug Foundation is devoted, "to promoting lifesaving organ and tissue donation and improving the quality of life for those touched by donation." Through the foundation's programs, they have inspired and influenced over thousands of young adults by sharing facts and information about organ and tissue donation so they can make educated decisions.

Based in Aspen, Colorado, they are able to spread donor awareness at several events throughout the year such as during the Winter X Games and during their own popular event called Summit For Life, a nighttime uphill race up Aspen Mountain.
