= Kiril Pandov (speed skater) =

Bulgarian speed skater

Personal information
- Nationality: Bulgarian
- Born: 7 March 1983 (age 42); Sofia, Poland

Sport
- Sport: Short track speed skating

Kiril Pandov (Bulgarian: Кирил Пандов; born 7 March 1983) is a Bulgarian short track speed skater. He competed in two events at the 2002 Winter Olympics.
