= Pavlina Filipova =

Bulgarian biathlete (born 1975)

Pavlina Ivanova Filipova (Bulgarian: Павлина Иванова Фипипова); born December 20, 1975, in Berkovitsa) is a Bulgarian biathlete. Her professional sporting career began in 1996. She has competed in three Winter Olympic Games. In 1998 and 2002, Filipova posted fourth-place finishes in the 15 km individual and 4 x 7.5 km relay, respectively. Filipova also won an individual gold medal for Bulgaria in the 15 km race at the 2006 Biathlon European Championships in Langdorf-Abersee, Germany. In the same year she was awarded a golden badge by the Bulgarian Olympic Committee. Filipova is married and has a daughter, called Adriana.

== Titles ==
- World Cup
  - No victories in World Cup events. Twice finished 3rd
  - 15th in general classification in 1999-2000 World Cup
