= Martin Johansson (speed skater) =

Swedish speed skater

Personal information
- Nationality: Swedish
- Born: 26 February 1973 (age 52); Malmö, Sweden

Sport
- Sport: Short track speed skating

Martin Johansson (born 26 February 1973) is a Swedish short track speed skater. He competed at the 1994 Winter Olympics, the 1998 Winter Olympics and the 2002 Winter Olympics.
