= Angel Pumpalov =

Bulgarian alpine skier (born 1978)

Personal information
- Nationality: Bulgarian
- Born: 20 February 1978 (age 47); Razlog, Bulgaria

Sport
- Sport: Alpine skiing

Angel Pumpalov (Bulgarian: Ангел Пумпалов, born 20 February 1978) is a Bulgarian alpine skier. He competed at the 1998 Winter Olympics and the 2002 Winter Olympics.
