= Mark Jackson (speed skater) =

New Zealand speed skater

Personal information
- Nationality: New Zealand
- Born: 21 December 1980 (age 44); Christchurch, New Zealand

Sport
- Sport: Short track speed skating

Mark Jackson (born 21 December 1980) is a New Zealand short track speed skater. He competed in three events at the 2002 Winter Olympics.
