= Mark McNee =

Australian speed skater (born 1981)

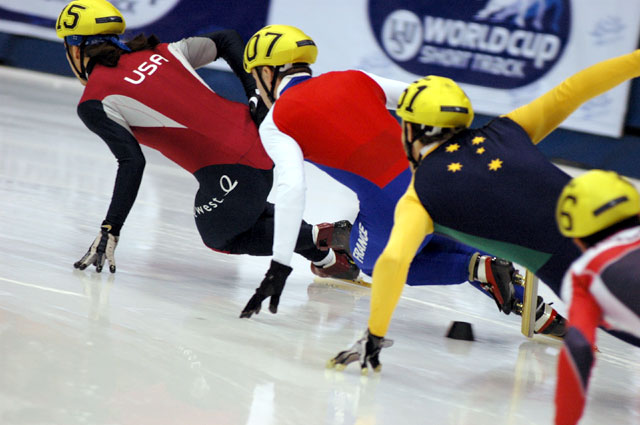
Mark McNee, third from left at the 2004 World Cup in Saguenay

Mark McNee (born 9 July 1981 in Adelaide) is an Australian short track speed skater. He lives in Brisbane where he works as an engineer for Energy Developments Limited. Married to Tasha McNee with two daughters, Elsbeth (eldest) and Jazzy (youngest).

He has competed at the 2002 and 2006 Winter Olympics.

== Results ==
=== 2002 Winter Olympics ===
- 1000 m: 15th/29
- 1500 m: 28th/29

=== 2006 Winter Olympics ===
- 1000 m: 20th/20
- 1500 m: 20th/24
- 5000 m: 6th/8
