= Krystian Zdrojkowski =

Polish speed skater (born 1982)

Personal information
- Nationality: Polish
- Born: 20 December 1982 (age 42); Białystok, Poland

Sport
- Sport: Short track speed skating

Krystian Zdrojkowski (born 20 December 1982) is a Polish short track speed skater. He competed in three events at the 2002 Winter Olympics.
