= Irina Nikulchina =

Bulgarian biathlete (born 1974)

Personal information
- Born: 18 December 1974 (age 51) Razlog, Blagoevgrad Province, Bulgaria
- Height: 1.72 m (5 ft 8 in)
- Weight: 55 kg (121 lb)

Sport
- Sport: Biathlon
- Club: SC Bansko
Medal record
Women's biathlon
Representing Bulgaria
Bronze medal – third place	2002 Salt Lake City	10 km Pursuit

Irina Nikulchina (Bulgarian: Ирина Никулчина) (born 8 December 1974 in Razlog) is a former Bulgarian biathlete.

At the 2002 Winter Olympics in Salt Lake City she won a bronze medal in the 10 km pursuit competition. She also competed in the cross-country skiing events in 1994 and 1998, and the biathlon at the 2006 Winter Olympics.
