= Leon Flack =

British speed skater (born 1981)

Personal information
- Full name: Leon Victor Flack
- Nationality: British
- Born: 25 January 1981 (age 44); Islington, England
- Height: 188 cm (6 ft 2 in)

Sport
- Sport: Short track speed skating

Leon Victor Flack (born 25 January 1981) is a British short track speed skater. He competed in three events at the 2002 Winter Olympics.
