= Miroslav Boyadzhiev =

Bulgarian speed skater

Personal information
- Nationality: Bulgarian
- Born: 18 July 1979 (age 45); Sofia, Bulgaria

Sport
- Sport: Short track speed skating

Miroslav Boyadzhiev (Bulgarian: Мирослав Бояджиев; born 18 July 1979) is a Bulgarian short track speed skater. He competed in three events at the 2002 Winter Olympics.
