= List of flag bearers for Hong Kong at the Olympics =

Hong Kong at the Olympics
- IOC code: HKG
- NOC: Sports Federation and Olympic Committee of Hong Kong, China
- Website: www.hkolympic.org (in Chinese and English)
- Medals: Gold 4 Silver 3 Bronze 6 Total 13

Summer appearances
- 1952; 1956; 1960; 1964; 1968; 1972; 1976; 1980; 1984; 1988; 1992; 1996; 2000; 2004; 2008; 2012; 2016; 2020; 2024

Winter appearances
- 2002; 2006; 2010; 2014; 2018; 2022; 2026

This is a list of flag bearers who have represented Hong Kong at the Olympics.

Flag bearers carry the flag of their national olympic committee at the opening ceremony and the closing ceremony of the Olympic Games.

#	Event year	Season	Ceremony	Flag	Flag bearer	Sport
1	1972	Summer	Opening	(British Hong Kong)	Peter Rull Sr.	Shooting
2	1984	Summer	Opening	(British Hong Kong)	Solomon Lee	Shooting
3	1988	Summer	Opening	(British Hong Kong)	Liu Fuk Man	Table tennis
4	1996	Summer	Opening	(British Hong Kong)	Chan Sau Ying	Athletics
5	1996	Summer	Closing	(British Hong Kong)	Lee Lai Shan	Sailing
6	2000	Summer	Opening	(Hong Kong)	Fenella Ng	Rowing
7	2000	Summer	Closing	(Hong Kong)	Mark Kwok	Swimming
8	2002	Winter	Opening	(Hong Kong)	Cordia Tsoi	Short track speed skating
9	2004	Summer	Opening	(Hong Kong)	Sherry Tsai	Swimming
10	2004	Summer	Closing	(Hong Kong)	Ko Lai Chak/Li Ching	Table tennis
11	2006	Winter	Opening	(Hong Kong)	Han Yueshuang	Short track speed skating
12	2008	Summer	Opening	(Hong Kong)	Wong Kam Po	Cycling
13	2008	Summer	Closing	(Hong Kong)	Law Hiu Fung	Rowing
14	2010	Winter	Opening	(Hong Kong)	Han Yueshuang	Short track speed skating
15	2012	Summer	Opening	(Hong Kong)	Lee Wai Sze	Cycling
16	2012	Summer	Closing	(Hong Kong)	Tang Peng	Table tennis
17	2014	Winter	Opening	(Hong Kong)	Pan-To Barton Lui	Short track speed skating
18	2016	Summer	Opening	(Hong Kong)	Stephanie Au	Swimming
19	2016	Summer	Closing	(Hong Kong)	Chan Chun Hing	Cycling
20	2018	Winter	Opening	(Hong Kong)	Arabella Ng	Alpine skiing
21	2020	Summer	Opening	(Hong Kong)	Ying Suet Tse; Cheung Ka Long	Badminton; Fencing
22	2020	Summer	Closing	(Hong Kong)	Grace Lau Mo-sheung	Karate
23	2022	Winter	Opening	(Hong Kong)	Sidney Chu	Short track speed skating
24	2024	Summer	Opening	(Hong Kong)	Cheung Ka Long; Siobhan Haughey	Fencing; Swimming
25	2024	Summer	Closing	(Hong Kong)	Lee Sze Wing; Lo Wai Fung	Cycling; Taekwondo

== See also ==
- Hong Kong at the Olympics
