= 2010 Winter Olympics Parade of Nations =

During the Parade of Nations at the 2010 Winter Olympics opening ceremony, held beginning at 6:00 PM PST on February 12, 2010, 82 athletes bearing the flags of their respective nations led their national delegations as they paraded into BC Place Stadium in the host city of Vancouver, British Columbia, Canada.

Athletes entered the stadium in an order dictated by tradition. As the originator of the Olympics, Greece entered first. Canadian delegates entered last, representing the host nation. The names of the nations were announced first in French and followed by English, the official languages of the Olympics, which also happened to be the official languages of the host nation. The nations entered in alphabetic order of their country names in English because it is the more dominant of the two languages in Vancouver and in the province of British Columbia.

Delegations from North Korea and South Korea marched in separate delegations, unlike in the 2006 Winter Olympics when they marched together.

Of the flag-bearers who led their respective delegations, all but one were athletes, the exception being Fuad Guliyev, a skating official from Azerbaijan. The sport which was most represented among the flag-bearers was alpine skiing, as alpine skiers led 26 delegations. Only one delegation was led by a short track speed skater, Hong Kong, led by Han Yue Shueng. Marjan Kalhor, an alpine skier and the flag-bearer for Iran, was both the first female flag bearer from her country and the first female athlete from her country to participate in the Winter Olympics. It was erroneously pointed out by a Canadian TV commentator that Tomomi Okazaki was the first female flag bearer for Japan. This title goes to Seiko Hashimoto in Calgary 1988. Other prominent flag bearers included Canadian speed skater and five-time Olympian Clara Hughes, American luger Mark Grimmette, who had helped carry the American flag during the 2002 Winter Olympics, and Czech hockey player Jaromír Jágr. Hughes is the only Olympian ever to win multiple medals at both the Summer and Winter Olympics.

Iason Abramashvili, flag bearer for Georgia, along with the other members of his delegation, wore black armbands during the march and received a standing ovation in memory of Nodar Kumaritashvili, a Georgian luger who was killed in an accident during a training run earlier in the day.

== Parade of Nations ==
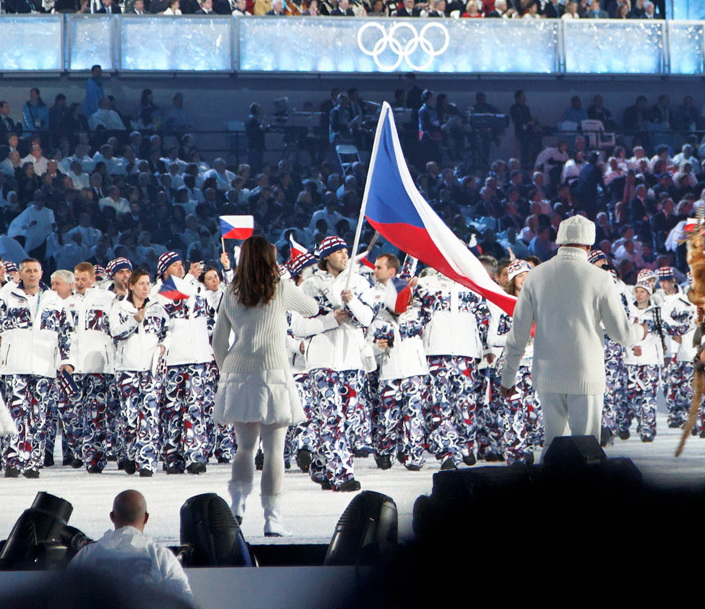
The Czech flag being carried by Jaromír Jágr.

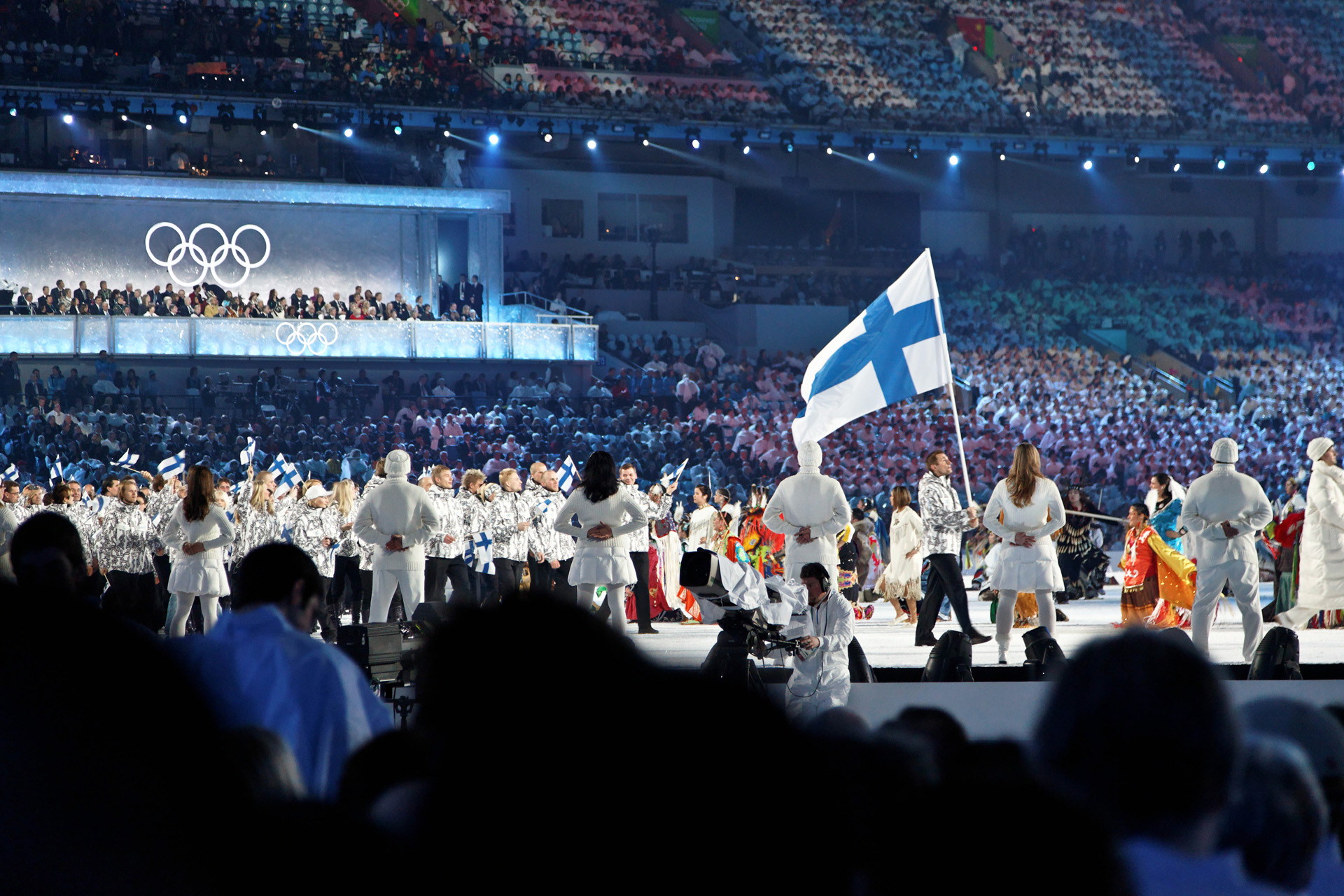
The Finnish flag being carried by Ville Peltonen.

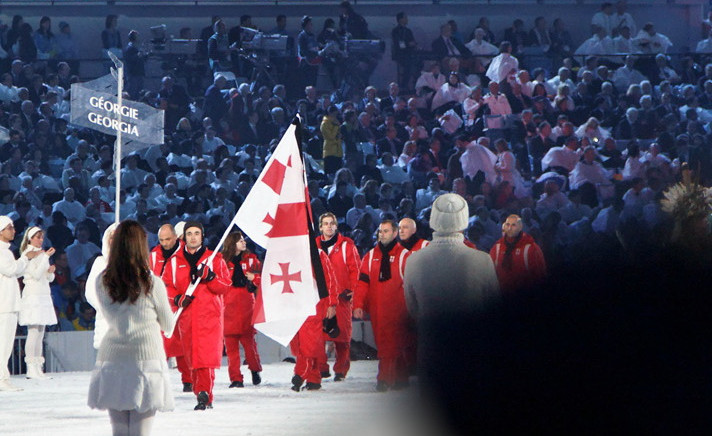
The Georgian flag being carried by Iason Abramashvili. In this picture the flag has a black ribbon.

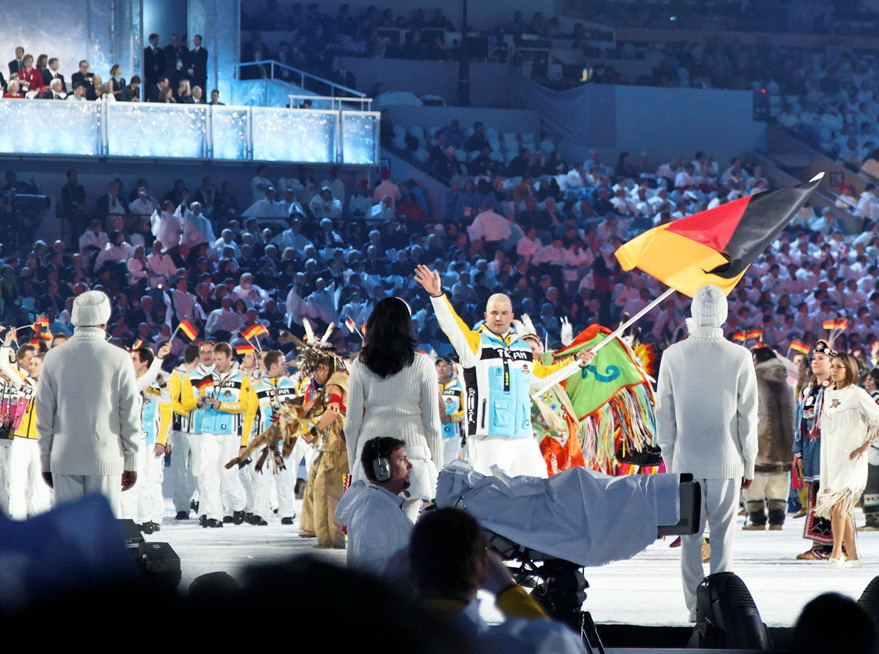
The German flag being carried by André Lange.

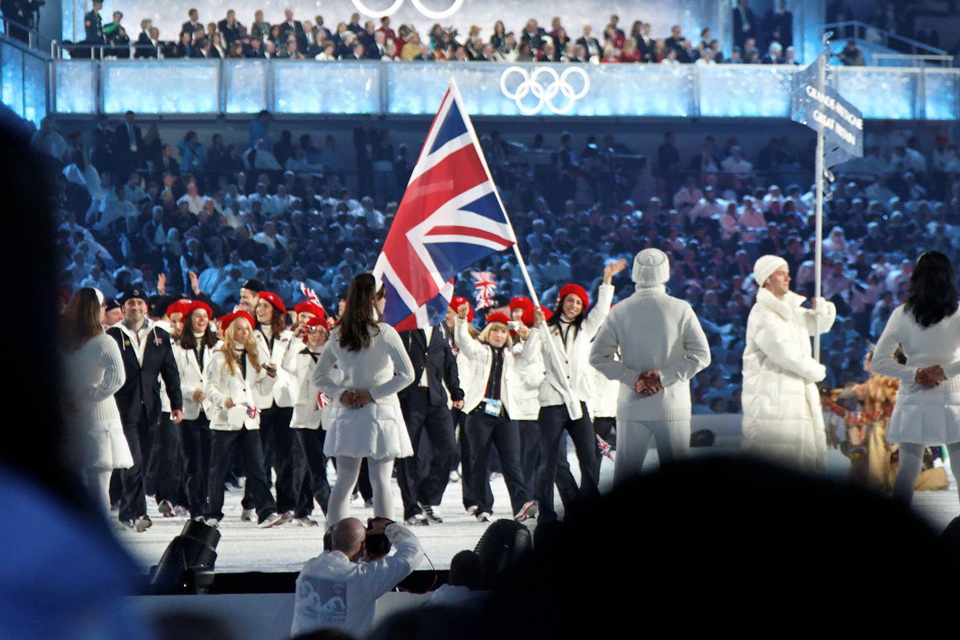
The British flag being carried by Shelley Rudman.

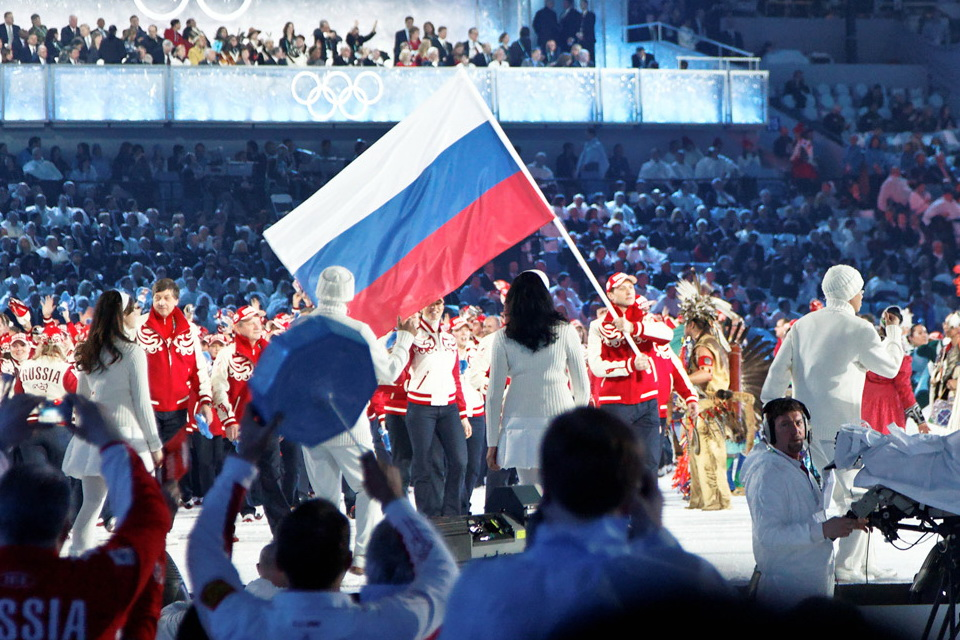
The Russian flag being carried by Aleksey Morozov.

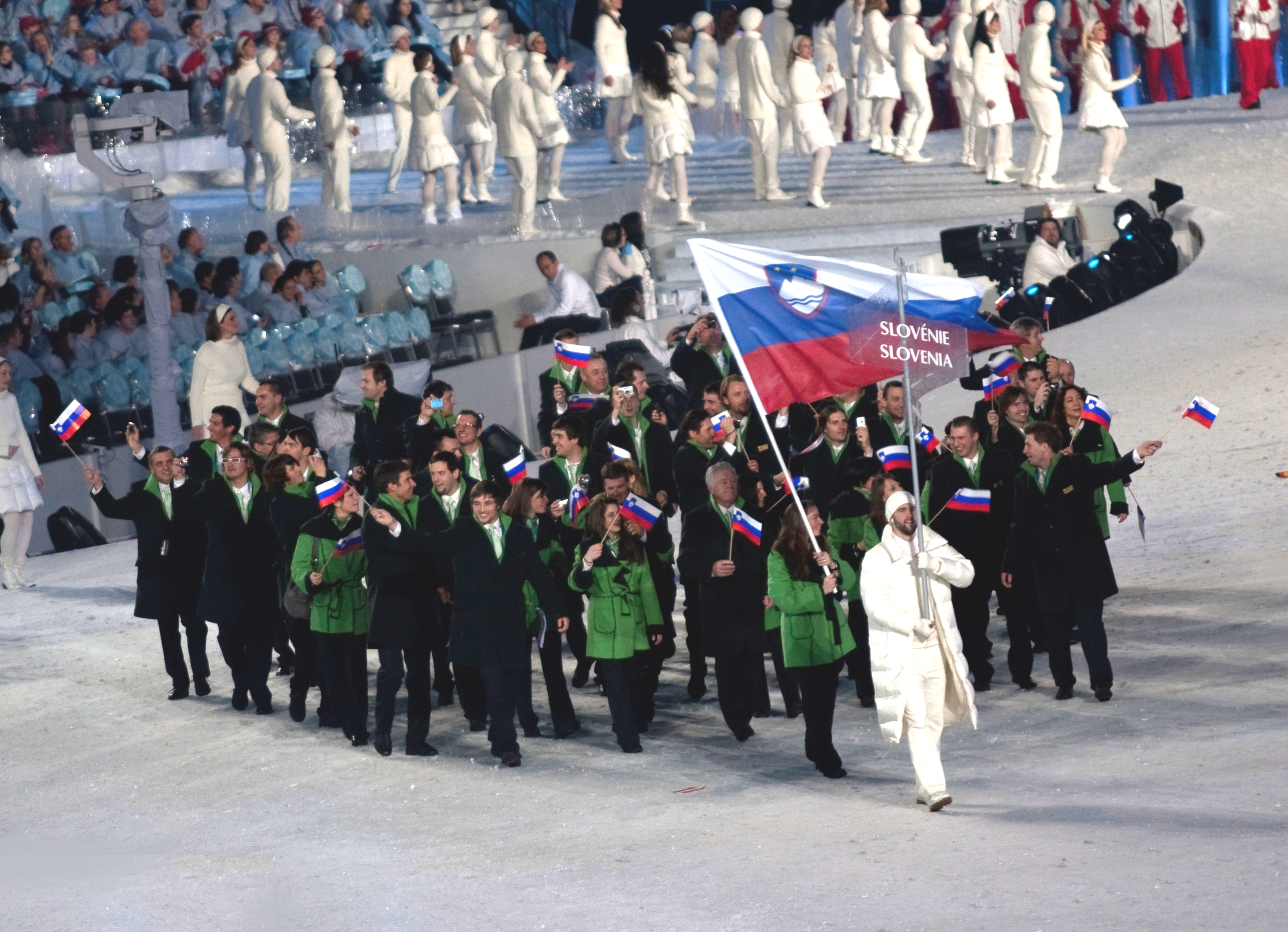
The Slovenian flag being carried by Tina Maze.

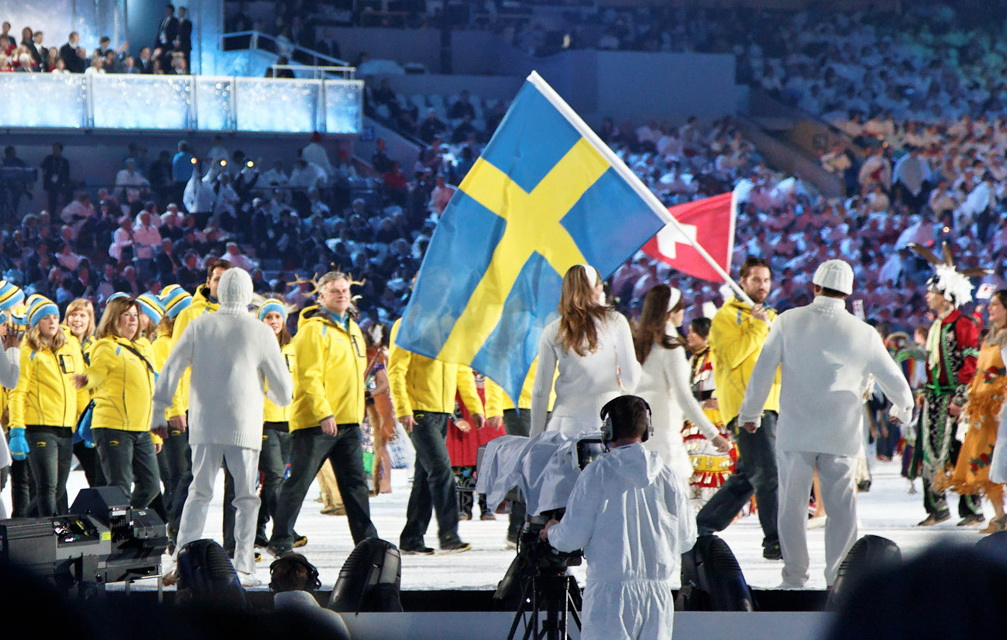
The Swedish flag being carried by Peter Forsberg.

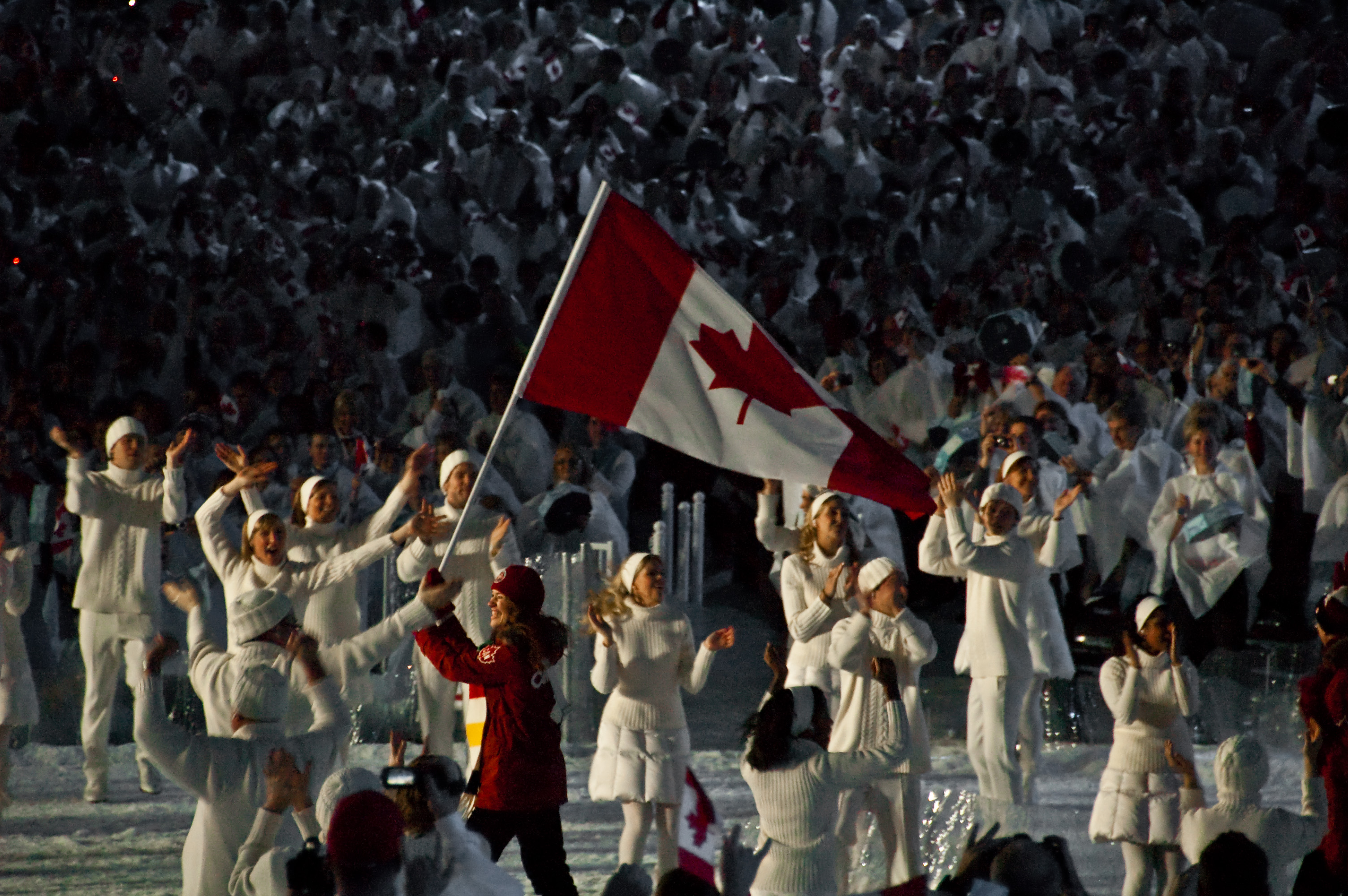
The Canadian flag being carried by Clara Hughes.

Order	Nation	Flag bearer	Sport
1	Greece	Athanassios Tsakiris	Biathlon
2	Albania	Erjon Tola	Alpine skiing
3	Algeria	Mehdi-Selim Khelifi	Cross-country skiing
4	Andorra	Lluis Marin Tarroch	Snowboarding
5	Argentina	Cristian Javier Simari Birkner	Alpine skiing
6	Armenia	Arsen Nersisyan	Alpine skiing
7	Australia	Torah Bright	Snowboarding
8	Austria	Andreas Linger & Wolfgang Linger	Luge
9	Azerbaijan	Fuad Guliyev (Fuad Quliyev)	Skating official
10	Belarus	Oleg Antonenko	Ice hockey
11	Belgium	Kevin van der Perren	Figure skating
12	Bermuda	Tucker Murphy	Cross-country skiing
13	Bosnia and Herzegovina	Žana Novaković	Alpine skiing
14	Brazil	Isabel Clark Ribeiro	Snowboarding
15	Bulgaria	Aleksandra Zhekova	Snowboarding
16	Cayman Islands	Dow Travers	Alpine skiing
17	Chile	Jorge Mandrú	Alpine skiing
18	China	Han Xiaopeng	Freestyle skiing
19	Colombia	Cynthia Denzler	Alpine skiing
20	Croatia	Jakov Fak	Biathlon
21	Cyprus	Christopher Papamichalopoulos	Alpine skiing
22	Czech Republic	Jaromír Jágr	Ice hockey
23	North Korea	Ri Song-Chol	Figure skating
24	Denmark	Sophie Fjellvang-Sølling	Freestyle skiing
25	Estonia	Roland Lessing	Biathlon
26	Ethiopia	Robel Teklemariam	Cross-country skiing
27	Finland	Ville Peltonen	Ice hockey
28	Macedonia	Antonio Ristevski	Alpine skiing
29	France	Vincent Defrasne	Biathlon
30	Georgia	Iason Abramashvili	Alpine skiing
31	Germany	André Lange	Bobsleigh
32	Ghana	Kwame Nkrumah-Acheampong	Alpine skiing
33	Great Britain	Shelley Rudman	Skeleton
34	Hong Kong	Han Yue Shueng	Short track speed skating
35	Hungary	Júlia Sebestyén	Figure skating
36	Iceland	Björgvin Björgvinsson	Alpine skiing
37	India	Shiva Keshavan	Luge
38	Iran	Marjan Kalhor	Alpine skiing
39	Ireland	Aoife Hoey	Bobsleigh
40	Israel	Alexandra Zaretsky	Figure skating
41	Italy	Giorgio Di Centa	Cross-country skiing
42	Jamaica	Errol Kerr	Freestyle skiing
43	Japan	Tomomi Okazaki	Speed skating
44	Kazakhstan	Dias Keneshev	Biathlon
45	South Korea	Kang Kwang-Bae	Bobsleigh
46	Kyrgyzstan	Dmitry Trelevski	Alpine skiing
47	Latvia	Martins Dukurs	Skeleton
48	Lebanon	Chirine Njeim	Alpine skiing
49	Liechtenstein	Richard Wunder	Bobsleigh
50	Lithuania	Irina Terentjeva	Cross-country skiing
51	Mexico	Hubertus von Hohenlohe	Alpine skiing
52	Moldova	Victor Pinzaru	Biathlon
53	Monaco	Alexandra Coletti	Alpine skiing
54	Mongolia	Erdene-Ochir Ochirsuren	Cross-country skiing
55	Montenegro	Bojan Kosić	Alpine skiing
56	Morocco	Samir Azzimani	Alpine skiing
57	Nepal	Dachhiri Sherpa	Cross-country skiing
58	Netherlands	Timothy Beck	Bobsleigh
59	New Zealand	Juliane Bray	Snowboarding
60	Norway	Tommy Jakobsen	Ice hockey
61	Pakistan	Muhammad Abbas	Alpine skiing
62	Peru	Roberto Carcelén	Cross-country skiing
63	Poland	Konrad Niedźwiedzki	Speed skating
64	Portugal	Danny Silva	Cross-country skiing
65	Romania	Éva Tófalvi	Biathlon
66	Russia	Aleksey Morozov	Ice hockey
67	San Marino	Marino Cardelli	Alpine skiing
68	Senegal	Leyti Seck	Alpine skiing
69	Serbia	Jelena Lolović	Alpine skiing
70	Slovakia	Žigmund Pálffy	Ice hockey
71	Slovenia	Tina Maze	Alpine skiing
72	South Africa	Oliver Kraas	Cross-country skiing
73	Spain	Queralt Castellet	Snowboarding
74	Sweden	Peter Forsberg	Ice hockey
75	Switzerland	Stéphane Lambiel	Figure skating
76	Chinese Taipei	Ma Chih-hung	Luge
77	Tajikistan	Alisher Kudratov	Alpine skiing*
78	Turkey	Kelime Aydın	Cross-country skiing
79	Ukraine	Liliya Ludan	Luge
80	United States	Mark Grimmette	Luge
81	Uzbekistan	Oleg Shamaev	Alpine skiing
82	Canada	Clara Hughes	Speed skating

- Kudratov carried the flag even though he wasn't scheduled to compete.

== See also ==
- 2010 Winter Olympics closing ceremony flag bearers
- 2010 Winter Paralympics national flag bearers
- 2008 Summer Olympics national flag bearers
