= Short-track speed skating at the 2014 Winter Olympics – Qualification =

The following is about the qualification rules and the quota allocation for the short track speed skating at the 2014 Winter Olympics.

== Qualification rules ==
A total quota of 120 athletes is allowed to compete at the Games (60 men and 60 women). Countries are assigned quotas using a combination of the four special Olympic Qualification classification that will be held at two world cups in November 2013. A nation may enter a maximum of five athletes per gender if it qualifies a relay team and three if it does not. Hosts Russia are guaranteed the full quota of 10 athletes. For the 500m, and 1000m there will be 32 qualifiers, for the 1500m 36 qualifiers, and the relay 8. Chinese Taipei and Lithuania qualified for the first time ever in the sport. Hong Kong sends its first male athlete in Winter Olympics to this event.

== Quota allocation ==
The ISU released quotas on 22 November 2013. They are as follows:

Nations	Men's 500m	Men's 1000m	Men's 1500m	Men's relay	Women's 500m	Women's 1000m	Women's 1500m	Women's relay	Athletes
Australia	1	0	0		0	1	1		2
Austria	0	0	0		1	1	1		1
Belarus	0	0	1		0	0	1		2
Canada	3	3	3	X	3	3	3	X	10
China	3	3	3	X	3	3	3	X	10
Czech Republic	0	0	1		0	1	1		2
France	2	3	3		1	1	1		4
Germany	1	1	1		0	0	1		2
Great Britain	2	3	1		2	1	2		5
Hong Kong	0	0	1		0	0	0		1
Hungary	2	3	3		1	1	2	X	8
Israel	1	1	1		0	0	0		1
Italy	2	1	2	X	3	3	3	X	10
Japan	1	2	3		3	3	3	X	8
Kazakhstan	2	0	2	X	1	1	1		6
Latvia	0	0	1		0	0	0		1
Lithuania	0	0	0		1	1	1		1
Netherlands	3	3	2	X	3	2	2	X	10
Poland	0	0	0		1	1	0		1
Russia	3	3	2	X	3	3	3	X	10
Slovakia	0	0	0		0	0	1		1
South Korea	2	2	3	X	3	3	3	X	10
Chinese Taipei	1	1	0		0	0	0		1
Ukraine	0	0	0		0	1	0		1
United States	3	3	3	X	3	2	3		8
Total: 25 NOCs	32	32	36	8	32	32	36	8	116
