= Short-track speed skating at the 2022 Winter Olympics – Qualification =

The following is about the qualification rules and the quota allocation for the short track speed skating at the 2022 Winter Olympics.

== Qualification rules ==
A total quota of 112 athletes are allowed to compete at the Games (56 men and 56 women). Countries are assigned quotas based on their performance during the 2021–22 ISU Short Track Speed Skating World Cup. Each nation is permitted to enter a maximum of four athletes per gender if it qualified a relay team and three if it did not. If, in a specific gender, the NOC has qualified eight individual starting places (i.e. 3 in the 500m, 3 in the 1000m, 2 in the 1500m) then they are allowed a maximum of five. Hosts China are guaranteed a quota of one entry per race for a total of eight athletes. There are a maximum of thirty-two qualifiers for the 500m and 1000m events; thirty-six for the 1500m events; eight for the men's and women's relays; and twelve for the mixed relay.

=== Additional quota's for the mixed team relay ===
If there are not twelve NOCs with both two male and two female quotas, and if the maximum allocation limit of 112 has not been reached, then NOCs may receive a maximum of one quota to become eligible for this race. These quotas will be given out in order of the NOCs ranking in the world cup standings until there are twelve qualified teams.

=== Allocation of remaining quotas ===
If the maximum of 112 has not been reached after fulfilling all the above qualification than the remaining quotas will be distributed to NOCs qualified in a relay event that have also qualified seven individual starting places in that specific gender. Following that, if there is still remaining quotas, they will be available to any nation that has qualified four athletes in a gender, with priority given to the rankings in the relay standings.

== Quota allocation ==
The ISU announced the complete breakdown of allocations on 9 December 2021, and the final list after reallocations on January 24, 2022.

| Nation | Men | | | | Women | | | | Mixed | Athletes |
| Nation | 500m | 1000m | 1500m | Relay | 500m | 1000m | 1500m | Relay | Mixed | Athletes |
|---|---|---|---|---|---|---|---|---|---|---|
| Australia | 1 | 1 | | | | | | | | 1 |
| Belgium | 1 | 1 | 1 | | 1 | 1 | 1 | | | 2 |
| Canada | 3 | 2 | 3 | X | 3 | 3 | 3 | X | X | 10 |
| China | 3 | 3 | 3 | X | 3 | 3 | 3 | X | X | 10 |
| Croatia | | | | | 1 | | 1 | | | 1 |
| Czech Republic | | | | | 1 | | 1 | | | 1 |
| France | 2 | 2 | 2 | | 2 | 2 | 2 | | X | 4 |
| Germany | | | | | | | 1 | | | 1 |
| Great Britain | | 2 | 1 | | 1 | 1 | 1 | | | 3 |
| Hong Kong | 1 | | | | | | | | | 1 |
| Hungary | 3 | 3 | 3 | X | 2 | 2 | 2 | | X | 7 |
| Israel | 1 | 1 | 1 | | | | | | | 1 |
| Italy | 2 | 2 | 3 | X (Note: The NOC receives an additional male quota according to the D.4.1 on isu communication 2407.) | 3 | 2 | 3 | X | X | 10 |
| Japan | 2 | 2 | 3 | X | 1 | 3 | 3 | | X | 7 |
| Kazakhstan | 3 | 1 | 2 | | | 1 | 1 | | X (Note: The NOC receives an additional female quota to compete in the mixed relay according to the D.3.2 on isu communication 2407.) | 5 |
| Latvia | 1 | 1 | 2 | | | | | | | 2 |
| Netherlands | 3 | 3 | 3 | X | 3 | 3 | 3 | X | X | 10 |
| Poland | | | 1 | | 3 | 2 | 2 | X | X (Note: The NOC receives an additional male quota to compete in the mixed relay according to the D.3.2 on isu communication 2407.) | 6 |
| ROC | 2 | 2 | 3 | X | 3 | 3 | 3 | X | X | 10 |
| South Korea | 2 | 3 | 3 | X | 2 | 3 | 3 | X | X | 10 |
| Turkey | | 1 | | | | | | | | 1 |
| Ukraine | 1 | | | | | | 1 | | | 2 |
| United States | 1 | 2 | 2 | | 3 | 3 | 2 | X | X | 7 |
| Total: 23 NOCs | 32 | 32 | 36 | 8 | 32 | 32 | 36 | 8 | 12 | 112 (58 men/54 women) |

== Relays ==
Nations could compete in four world cup races, and are ranked by their three best scores. The top eight men's and women's teams qualify while the top twelve mixed teams qualify.

Final standings

=== Men's ===
| Criteria | Athletes per NOC | Total Athletes | NOC |
|---|---|---|---|
| Top 8 and has 8 individual quotas | 5 | 25 | Canada; South Korea; Hungary; China; Netherlands |
| Top 8 and has 7 or less individual quotas | 5 (Note: The NOC receives an additional male quota according to the D.4.1 on isu communication 2407.) | 10 | Italy; ROC |
| Top 8 and has 7 or less individual quotas | 4 | 4 | Japan |
| Next available NOC | | | France; Belgium; United States; Kazakhstan; Germany; Poland; Great Britain; Austria; Ukraine; Turkey; Singapore |
| Total | | 39 | |

=== Women's ===
| Criteria | Athletes per NOC | Total Athletes | NOC |
|---|---|---|---|
| Top 8 and has 8 individual quotas | 5 | 35 | Netherlands; South Korea; Canada; China; Italy; ROC; United States |
| Top 8 and has 7 or less individual quotas | 4 | 4 | Poland |
| Next available NOC | | | Japan; France; Hungary; Kazakhstan; Ukraine; Belarus; Great Britain |
| Total | | 39 | |

=== Mixed team ===
| Criteria | NOC |
|---|---|
| 2 qualified men and women | China; Netherlands; Hungary; ROC; Canada; South Korea; Italy; France; Japan; United States |
| Receives an extra quota to compete in the mixed team relay | Kazakhstan; Poland |
| Needs more than 1 quota | Belgium (Note: The NOC were initially ranked 10th in the Mixed Team Relay SOQC but due to the limitation of extra quota per NOC it has been disqualified. Instead, Kazakhstan and Poland receives an additional female and male quota respectively and are qualified for the event. They were ranked 12th and 13th in the SOQC.); Croatia; Belarus; Germany; Great Britain; Ukraine; Czech Republic; Bulgaria |

== Individual distances ==
The first placed racer (per NOC) is ranked based on the three best world cup results, out of four, for each race. This means that multiple skaters could have a part in that ranking. The second and third best were ranked in the same way. For the 500m and 1000m the top 32 qualify, and for the 1500m the top 36 qualify. The next best six nations for each race are shown.

| Indicates the second best qualifier for a nation |
| Indicates the third best qualifier for a nation |

Final standings after four of four races.

=== Men's ===
| World cup rank | 500m |
|---|---|
| 1 | Hungary |
| 2 | China |
| 3 | Hungary |
| 4 | Canada |
| 5 | South Korea |
| 6 | Kazakhstan |
| 7 | ROC |
| 8 | China |
| 9 | Kazakhstan |
| 10 | ROC |
| 11 | Hungary |
| 12 | Netherlands |
| 13 | Japan |
| 14 | South Korea |
| 15 | Italy |
| 16 | France |
| 17 | Canada |
| 18 | United States |
| 19 | Netherlands |
| 20 | China |
| 21 | Hong Kong |
| 22 | Netherlands |
| 23 | Latvia |
| 24 | Italy |
| 25 | Ukraine |
| 26 | Canada |
| 27 | Belgium |
| 28 | Kazakhstan |
| 29 | France |
| 30 | Israel |
| 31 | Australia |
| 32 | Japan |
| 33 | Germany |
| 34 | United States |
| 35 | Latvia |
| 36 | South Korea |
| 37 | Germany |
| 38 | ROC |

| World cup rank | 1000m |
|---|---|
| 1 | South Korea |
| 2 | Canada |
| 3 | Hungary |
| 4 | Netherlands |
| 5 | China |
| 6 | ROC |
| 7 | Hungary |
| 8 | Italy |
| 9 | Netherlands |
| 10 | United States |
| 11 | Australia |
| 12 | Japan |
| 13 | France |
| 14 | Canada |
| 15 | Great Britain |
| 16 | Israel |
| 17 | Kazakhstan |
| 18 | South Korea |
| 19 | ROC |
| 20 | Netherlands |
| 21 | China |
| 22 | Latvia |
| 23 | Belgium |
| 24 | Hungary |
| 25 | Great Britain |
| 26 | South Korea |
| 27 | France |
| 28 | China |
| 29 | Turkey |
| 30 | Italy |
| 31 | Japan |
| 32 | United States |
| 33 | Canada |
| 34 | Japan |
| 35 | Poland |
| 36 | Belgium |
| 37 | Austria |
| 38 | Kazakhstan |

| World cup rank | 1500m |
|---|---|
| 1 | China |
| 2 | South Korea |
| 3 | ROC |
| 4 | Canada |
| 5 | Netherlands |
| 6 | Italy |
| 7 | Hungary |
| 8 | Belgium |
| 9 | Kazakhstan |
| 10 | France |
| 11 | Hungary |
| 12 | China |
| 13 | South Korea |
| 14 | Canada |
| 15 | Israel |
| 16 | Netherlands |
| 17 | Japan |
| 18 | China |
| 19 | ROC |
| 20 | Latvia |
| 21 | Italy |
| 22 | ROC |
| 23 | United States |
| 24 | Japan |
| 25 | Kazakhstan |
| 26 | Great Britain |
| 27 | Italy |
| 28 | Japan |
| 29 | United States |
| 30 | France |
| 31 | Hungary |
| 32 | Netherlands |
| 33 | Canada |
| 34 | South Korea |
| 35 | Poland |
| 36 | Latvia |
| 37 | Ireland |
| 38 | Turkey |
| 39 | Germany |
| 40 | Austria |
| 41 | Czech Republic |
| 42 | Czech Republic |

=== Women's ===
| World cup rank | 500m |
|---|---|
| 1 | Italy |
| 2 | Canada |
| 3 | Poland |
| 4 | Netherlands |
| 5 | China |
| 6 | ROC |
| 7 | Canada |
| 8 | United States |
| 9 | South Korea |
| 10 | Netherlands |
| 11 | Italy |
| 12 | China |
| 13 | France |
| 14 | Canada |
| 15 | China |
| 16 | Hungary |
| 17 | Netherlands |
| 18 | ROC |
| 19 | South Korea |
| 20 | United States |
| 21 | Japan |
| 22 | Italy |
| 23 | Great Britain |
| 24 | Poland |
| 25 | Hungary |
| 26 | United States |
| 27 | ROC |
| 28 | Poland |
| 29 | France |
| 30 | Belgium |
| 31 | Croatia |
| 32 | Czech Republic |
| 33 | Japan |
| 34 | Great Britain |
| 35 | Kazakhstan |
| 36 | South Korea |
| 37 | Slovakia |
| 38 | Hungary |

| World cup rank | 1000m |
|---|---|
| 1 | Netherlands |
| 2 | South Korea |
| 3 | United States |
| 4 | Canada |
| 5 | Netherlands |
| 6 | Poland |
| 7 | Canada |
| 8 | Italy |
| 9 | ROC |
| 10 | China |
| 11 | South Korea |
| 12 | ROC |
| 13 | Hungary |
| 14 | ROC |
| 15 | China |
| 16 | United States |
| 17 | Italy |
| 18 | Netherlands |
| 19 | France |
| 20 | Japan |
| 21 | South Korea |
| 22 | Hungary |
| 23 | Canada |
| 24 | China |
| 25 | Kazakhstan |
| 26 | Japan |
| 27 | Belgium |
| 28 | France |
| 29 | Japan |
| 30 | Great Britain |
| 31 | United States |
| 32 | Poland |
| 33 | France |
| 34 | Italy |
| 35 | Czech Republic |
| 36 | Germany |
| 37 | Slovakia |
| 38 | Bulgaria |

| World cup rank | 1500m |
|---|---|
| 1 | South Korea |
| 2 | Netherlands |
| 3 | Canada |
| 4 | United States |
| 5 | Italy |
| 6 | China |
| 7 | South Korea |
| 8 | Netherlands |
| 9 | South Korea |
| 10 | ROC |
| 11 | Canada |
| 12 | China |
| 13 | Belgium |
| 14 | Japan |
| 15 | France |
| 16 | Italy |
| 17 | Germany |
| 18 | Hungary |
| 19 | United States |
| 20 | Netherlands |
| 21 | ROC |
| 22 | France |
| 23 | Great Britain |
| 24 | China |
| 25 | Poland |
| 26 | Italy |
| 27 | Hungary |
| 28 | Japan |
| 29 | Canada |
| 30 | Japan |
| 31 | Ukraine |
| 32 | Czech Republic |
| 33 | Kazakhstan |
| 34 | Poland |
| 35 | ~~Germany~~ |
| 36 | ROC |
| 37 | Croatia |
| 38 | United States |
| 39 | Poland |
| 40 | Slovakia |
| 41 | France |
| 42 | Hungary |
