= Short-track speed skating at the 2026 Winter Olympics – Qualification =

The qualification process for the nine short-track speed skating events at the 2026 Winter Olympics is based on performance of skaters at designated 2025–26 ISU Short Track World Tour events. Results at these events determine the Special Olympic Qualification Classifications rankings that are used for quota allocation to National Olympic Committees (NOC).

== Qualification rules ==
=== Maximum quota places per event ===
There will be nine short-track speed skating events at the 2026 Winter Olympics: three individual events each for men and women, one team event each for men and women, and one event for mixed teams. Maximum quota places are established per event, as follows:

Maximum quota places per event
	Men	Women
Individual events
500 meter	32	32
1000 meter	32	32
1500 meter	36	36
Team events
5000 meter relay	8	
3000 meter relay		8
2000 meter relay	12	

The quota places will be assigned to National Olympic Committees following the rankings of the Special Olympic Qualification Classifications.

=== Special Olympic Qualification Classifications ===
The following four stages of the 2025–26 ISU Short Track World Tour count towards the Special Olympic Qualification Classifications.

- Stage 1: Montreal, 9-12 October 2025
- Stage 2: Montreal, 16-19 October 2025
- Stage 3: Gdansk, 20-23 November 2025
- Stage 4: Dordrecht, 27-30 November 2025

For each Olympic event, NOCs or teams are ranked by total points scored in their best three results. The total for individual events is achieved by adding an NOCs (not athlete's) best result in each stage for its first qualifier, then adding their 2nd best result in each stage for their second qualifier, then adding their 3rd best result in each stage for their third qualifier. The points system used for ranking will be the "World Ranking", not the "World Tour Points", numbering from 1000 down to 1, so all competitors who are classified in a race receive points.

=== Maximum number of quota places and athletes per NOC ===
The quota places are assigned to NOC´s in order of the SOQC rankings, taking into account the following rules:

- Each NOC can obtain a maximum of three quota places per individual event and one quota place per team event.
- Each NOC can register a maximum of three men and three women.
- NOC´s with a quota place for a team event register four athletes.
- NOC's with eight starting places in a gender, and qualified for the relay, qualify a fifth athlete.
- After the twelve mixed relay teams are established an additional athlete may be assigned if the NOC has seven starting places in individual races of that gender, and the maximum 112 athletes have not been allocated. Ranking in the relay standings will be used to determine the order for this allocation. Thus, ten athletes is the maximum for NOC´s that qualify for both men and women relay events.
- The host country participates in the qualification events. If it does not qualify for a quota place, it will be assigned one quota place for each individual event and one for each team event.
- A maximum of 112 athletes will be allowed to compete.

== Quota allocation ==
Final ranking, based on World Ranking Points obtained after four qualifying events. The final quota allocation was confirmed by the International Skating Union on 10 December 2025. On 26 January 2026 the ISU confirmed final entry quotas following the conclusion of reallocation.

=== Summary ===
Nation	Men					Women					Mixed	Athletes
Nation	500m	1000m	1500m	Relay	total	500m	1000m	1500m	Relay	total	Mixed	Athletes
Australia	1	1	1		1		~~1~~			~~1~~		1
Austria	1		1		1							1
Belgium	1	1	1	X	4	1	1	2		2	X	6
Canada	3	3	3	X	5	3	3	3	X	5	X	10
China	3	3	3	X	5	3	3	3	X	5	X	10
Croatia						1	1	2		2		2
Czech Republic								1		1		1
France		2	2		2	1	2	2	X	4	X	6
Great Britain	1	1	~~2~~ 1		~~2~~ 1	~~1~~ 0				~~1~~ 0		1
Hong Kong		1	1		1			1		1		2
Hungary	1	2	2	X	4	1	2	2		2	X	6
Individual Neutral Athletes		1	1		1	1	1			1		2
Italy	3	3	3	X	5	3	3	3	X	5	X	10
Japan	2	2	3	X	4	2	3	3	X	5	X	9
Kazakhstan	2	1			2	2	1	2		2	X	4
Latvia	1	2	1		2							2
Netherlands	3	2	3	X	5	3	3	3	X	5	X	10
Poland	2	2	2		2	2	2	3		3	X	5
Slovakia						1				1		1
South Korea	2	3	3	X	5	3	3	3	X	5	X	10
Turkey	2				2							2
Ukraine	1		1		1	1				1		2
United States	2	2	3		3	3	3	3	X	5	X	8
Uzbekistan	1				1							1
Total: 24 NOCs	32	32	35 (Note: unused quota will be filled "on-site" by qualified competitors already at the games, with priority given by their SOQC ranking.)	8	57	31	31	36	8	55	12	112

The first placed racer (per NOC) is ranked based on their best three results out of four for each race. This means that multiple skaters could have a part in that ranking. The second and third best are ranked in the same way. For the 500m and 1000m the top 32 qualify, for the 1500m the top 36 qualify, and for the relay the top 8 qualify. The next best six nations for each race are shown. Russia are allowed to enter one athlete per distance during qualifying and can qualify a maximum of one male and one female skater as neutrals.

=== Men's ===
SOQC rank	500m	points
1	Canada1	30000
2	China1	20771
3	Italy1	19861
4	Canada2	18887
5	United States1	18110
6	Netherlands1	15132
7	China2	13156
8	Japan1	11414
9	Canada3	11182
10	Italy2	10261
11	Poland1	9772
12	Turkey1	6887
13	Netherlands2	6597
14	Belgium1	5046
15	Latvia1	4768
16	United States2	4677
17	Kazakhstan1	4670
18	China3	4600
19	Kazakhstan2	2079
20	South Korea1	1866
21	Netherlands3	1770
22	Japan2	1536
23	Turkey2	1341
24	Uzbekistan1	1096
25	Great Britain1	1084
26	Ukraine1	933
27	South Korea2	894
28	Australia1	853
29	Italy3	836
30	Poland2	668
31	Hungary1	655
32	Austria1	654
33	Philippines1	628
34	Japan3	518
35	Poland3	496
36	France1	471
37	Belgium2	392
38	Latvia2	368

SOQC rank	1000m	points
1	South Korea1	25725
2	Italy1	25725
3	Canada1	22445
4	China1	21866
5	Netherlands1	16087
6	Canada2	15662
7	China2	14567
8	Latvia1	12197
9	South Korea2	10524
10	Italy2	8650
11	Canada3	8306
12	Great Britain1	7800
13	South Korea3	4600
14	Belgium1	4474
15	Australia1	4265
16	France1	3844
17	United States1	3715
18	China3	3324
19	Poland1	2980
20	Japan1	2782
21	Hungary1	2284
22	Individual Neutral Athletes	2111
23	Kazakhstan1	1874
24	Netherlands2	1830
25	Latvia2	1514
26	Japan2	1358
27	Italy3	1315
28	United States2	925
29	Poland2	795
30	France2	764
31	Hong Kong1	727
32	Hungary2	683
33	United States3	477
34	Ukraine1	461
35	Turkey1	452
36	Kazakhstan2	366
37	Great Britain2	289
38	Netherlands3	275

SOQC rank	1500m	points
1	Canada1	30000
2	Italy1	20782
3	Canada2	20162
4	Japan1	19861
5	China1	18221
6	South Korea1	17162
7	Italy2	14387
8	Netherlands1	12113
9	South Korea2	10452
10	Latvia1	10099
11	Netherlands2	8671
12	Australia1	6254
13	China2	6096
14	Japan2	6071
15	United States1	5841
16	United States2	3717
17	Great Britain1	3666
18	South Korea3	3308
19	Italy3	3198
20	Canada3	2711
21	Hungary1	2509
22	Poland1	2361
23	Belgium1	2352
24	Individual Neutral Athletes	1615
25	Japan3	1456
26	Netherlands3	1247
27	United States3	1157
28	China3	937
29	Hong Kong1	914
30	France1	905
31	Great Britain2 (Note: GBR refused one quota in the 1500m that will be filled at the games by the highest ranked eligible NOC.)	643
32	Austria1	613
33	Poland2	590
34	France2	559
35	Hungary2	513
36	Ukraine1	511
37	Uzbekistan1	418
38	Latvia2	416
39	Great Britain3	415
40	Turkey1	326
41	Chinese Taipei1	277
42	Norway1	257

SOQC rank	relay	points
1	China	25500
2	South Korea	25220
3	Netherlands	24641
4	Italy	21675
5	Canada	21361
6	Japan	13428
7	Belgium	13311
8	Hungary	11182
9	United States	9331
10	Great Britain	8247
11	Poland	7760
12	Latvia	6615
13	Kazakhstan	6301
14	Germany	5918

=== Women's ===
SOQC rank	500m	points
1	Netherlands1	30000
2	Canada1	27000
3	United States1	24225
4	Canada2	17665
5	Netherlands2	15798
6	South Korea1	15170
7	United States2	14349
8	Netherlands3	9417
9	Italy1	8812
10	Poland1	7900
11	China1	6402
12	Belgium1	6254
13	China2	5158
14	Italy2	5108
15	South Korea2	4865
16	Italy3	4135
17	Japan1	3756
18	Poland2	3726
19	Croatia1	3047
20	Canada3	2288
21	Kazakhstan1	1996
22	China3	1853
23	United States3	1807
24	France1	1707
25	Hungary1	1167
26	Individual Neutral Athletes	1078
27	Great Britain1 (Note: Great Britain refused one quota in the 500m that will be filled at the games by the highest ranked eligible NOC.)	805
28	South Korea3	738
29	Ukraine1	681
30	Kazakhstan2	592
31	Slovakia1	591
32	Japan2	581
33	France2	540
34	Belgium2	479
35	Hungary2	417
36	Czech Republic1	401
37	Hong Kong1	369
38	Kazakhstan3	279

SOQC rank	1000m	points
1	Canada1	30000
2	Belgium1	23366
3	United States1	22950
4	South Korea1	21437
5	Netherlands1	18586
6	Italy1	15660
7	Canada2	13784
8	Netherlands2	9858
9	Japan2	9137
10	Italy2	7705
11	United States2	7627
12	South Korea2	6254
13	China1	5198
14	Poland2	4924
15	South Korea3	3726
16	Canada3	3168
17	France1	3083
18	Japan2	3081
19	China2	2473
20	Netherlands3	2139
21	Hungary1	2023
22	Italy3	1974
23	France2	1726
24	Croatia1	1441
25	United States3	1162
26	Poland2	967
27	Australia1 (Note: Australia refused one quota in the 1000m that will be filled at the games by the highest ranked eligible NOC.)	815
28	Hungary2	768
29	Individual Neutral Athletes	710
30	China3	700
31	Kazakhstan1	688
32	Japan3	637
33	Poland3	563
34	Great Britain1	497
35	Croatia2	428
36	Kazakhstan2	402
37	Belgium2	304
38	Hong Kong1	253

SOQC rank	1500m	points
1	South Korea1	30000
2	Canada1	25725
3	United States1	21866
4	South Korea2	20162
5	Italy1	14086
6	United States2	12690
7	Belgium1	11881
8	Netherlands1	11414
9	Poland1	11071
10	China1	9293
11	Italy2	6887
12	China2	5841
13	Netherlands2	5607
14	France1	4824
15	Japan1	4670
16	Italy3	4580
17	Czech Republic1	3404
18	Canada2	3324
19	South Korea3	3182
20	Poland2	2519
21	Hungary1	2508
22	Kazakhstan1	2284
23	China3	1723
24	Canada3	1689
25	Croatia1	1344
26	Japan2	1324
27	United States3	1319
28	Kazakhstan2	1072
29	Netherlands3	727
30	Hungary2	705
31	Belgium2	666
32	France2	590
33	Japan3	571
34	Croatia2 (Note: Initial allocations only allowed for 33 quotas in the 1500m. Great Britain and Australia declined their only female quotas which meant that the event quota of 36 could be restored.)	503
35	Hong Kong1	429
36	Poland3	402
37	Great Britain1	386
38	Latvia1	378
39	Slovakia1	357
40	Ukraine1	355
41	Kazakhstan3	278
42	Germany1	252

SOQC rank	relay	points
1	Netherlands	28500
2	South Korea	24641
3	Canada	22445
4	United States	20945
5	Italy	20782
6	Japan	16766
7	China	13165
8	France	12645
9	Hungary	10933
10	Poland	10748
11	Kazakhstan	7491
12	Ukraine	5315
13	Germany	1673
14		

=== Mixed ===
Qualification priority is given to NOCs who have two male and two female athletes already qualified, the top twelve qualify. If less than twelve teams qualify this way then a maximum of one quota per NOC will be allocated to bring the total to twelve.

SOQC rank	relay	points
1	Netherlands	27000
2	South Korea	25725
3	Canada	24450
4	China	21361
5	United States	16708
6	Italy	14877
7	Poland	14767
8	Japan	13428
9	Belgium	9478
10	Kazakhstan	6663
11	France	6463
12	Hungary	6305
13	Croatia	6301
14	Ukraine	5064
15	Germany	4025
16	Great Britain	3627
17	Czech Republic	1771
18		
