= Short-track speed skating at the 2026 Winter Olympics – Women's 1500 metres =

Women's 1500 metres at the XXV Olympic Winter Games
- Short-track speed skating
- Venue: Forum di Milano, Milan
- Date: 20 February
- Competitors: 36 from 15 nations
- Winning time: 2:32.076

Medalists
1st place, gold medalist(s)		Kim Gil-li	South Korea
2nd place, silver medalist(s)		Choi Min-jeong	South Korea
3rd place, bronze medalist(s)		Corinne Stoddard	United States

The women's 1500 metres competition in short-track speed skating at the 2026 Winter Olympics was held on 20 February 2026 at the Forum di Milano in Milan. Kim Gil-li from South Korea won the event, getting her first individual Olympic gold. Her teammate, the defending champion Choi Min-jeong won the silver medal, and Corinne Stoddard of the United States won bronze, her first Olympic medal.

== Background ==
The defending champion, Choi Min-jeong, qualified for the event, as did the silver medalist Arianna Fontana and the bronze medalist Suzanne Schulting. Before the Olympics, Kim Gil-li was leading the 2025–26 ISU Short Track World Tour 1500 m standings, and Courtney Sarault led the overall standings. Choi Min-jeong was also the 1500 m 2025 World champion.

== Qualification ==
Countries were assigned quotas based on their performance during the 2025–26 ISU Short Track World Tour. A total of 36 athletes from 15 nations qualified for the event.

== Records ==
Prior to this competition, the world and Olympic records were as follows.

World record	Choi Min-jeong (KOR)	2:14.354	Salt Lake City, United States	12 November 2016
Olympic record	Choi Min-jeong (KOR)	2:16.831	Beijing, China	16 February 2022

== Results ==
=== Quarterfinals ===
20 February 2026, 20:15 PM

Rank	Heat	Name	Country	Time	Notes
1	1	Kim Gil-li	South Korea	2:32.080	Q
2	1	Kim Boutin	Canada	2:32.209	Q
3	1	Zhang Chutong	China	2:32.321	Q
4	1	Natalia Maliszewska	Poland	2:34.131	
5	1	Valentina Aščić	Croatia	2:58.133	
	1	Michelle Velzeboer	Netherlands		DNF
1	2	Courtney Sarault	Canada	2:29.331	Q
2	2	Yang Jinru	China	2:29.524	Q
3	2	Maja Somodi	Hungary	2:29.673	Q
4	2	Kamryn Lute	United States	2:30.347	
5	2	Yana Khan	Kazakhstan	3:08.414	
	2	Gong Li	China		PEN
1	3	Tineke den Dulk	Belgium	2:28.037	Q
2	3	Choi Min-jeong	South Korea	2:29.010	Q
3	3	Arianna Sighel	Italy	2:29.922	Q
4	3	Diána Laura Végi	Hungary	2:30.078	q
5	3	Ami Hirai	Japan	2:30.194	
	3	Cloé Ollivier	France		PEN
1	4	Corinne Stoddard	United States	2:27.961	Q
2	4	Haruna Nagamori	Japan	2:28.606	Q
3	4	Aurélie Lévêque	France	2:30.023	Q
4	4	Olga Tikhonova	Kazakhstan	2:30.169	
5	4	Mirei Nakashima	Japan	2:53.959	
6	4	Gabriela Topolska	Poland	3:02.875	
1	5	Xandra Velzeboer	Netherlands	2:27.522	Q
2	5	Elisa Confortola	Italy	2:27.605	Q
3	5	Suzanne Schulting	Netherlands	2:27.705	Q
4	5	Danaé Blais	Canada	2:28.266	q
5	5	Katarina Burić	Croatia	2:31.874	
	5	Petra Vaňková	Czech Republic		DNF
1	6	Hanne Desmet	Belgium	2:24.365	Q
2	6	Arianna Fontana	Italy	2:25.024	Q
3	6	Noh Do-hee	South Korea	2:25.152	Q
4	6	Joey Lam Ching Yan	Hong Kong	2:29.027	q
	6	Kristen Santos-Griswold	United States		PEN
	6	Kamila Sellier	Poland		PEN

=== Semifinals ===
20 February 2026, 21:00 PM

Rank	Heat	Name	Country	Time	Notes
1	1	Kim Gil-li	South Korea	2:29.385	QA
2	1	Arianna Fontana	Italy	2:29.512	QA
3	1	Zhang Chutong	China	2:29.578	QB
4	1	Danaé Blais	Canada	2:30.937	QB
5	1	Kim Boutin	Canada	2:33.734	
6	1	Hanne Desmet	Belgium	3:10.532	
7	1	Noh Do-hee	South Korea	No time	
1	2	Yang Jingru	China	2:33.458	QA
2	2	Joey Lam Ching Yan	Hong Kong	2:37.290	QA
3	2	Xandra Velzeboer	Netherlands	2:41.237	QB
4	2	Courtney Sarault	Canada	2:48.617	QB
5	2	Aurélie Lévêque	France	2:54.173	
6	2	Elisa Confortola	Italy	2:55.438	ADVB
7	2	Suzanne Schulting	Netherlands	3:08.987	
1	3	Choi Min-jeong	South Korea	2:20.984	QA
2	3	Corinne Stoddard	United States	2:21.042	QA
3	3	Arianna Sighel	Italy	2:21.120	qA
4	3	Maja Somodi	Hungary	2:21.225	QB
5	3	Haruna Nagamori	Japan	2:21.390	QB
6	3	Diána Laura Végi	Hungary	2:24.688	
7	3	Tineke den Dulk	Belgium	2:26.300	

=== Finals ===
==== Final B ====
20 February 2026, 21:56 PM

Rank	Name	Country	Time	Notes
8	Xandra Velzeboer	Netherlands	2:35.554	
9	Courtney Sarault	Canada	2:35.616	
10	Elisa Confortola	Italy	2:35.836	
11	Zhang Chutong	China	2:37.181	
12	Maja Somodi	Hungary	2:37.291	
13	Haruna Nagamori	Japan	2:37.450	
14	Danaé Blais	Canada	2:42.822	

==== Final A ====
20 February 2026, 22:03 PM

Rank	Name	Country	Time	Notes
1st place, gold medalist(s)	Kim Gil-li	South Korea	2:32.076	
2nd place, silver medalist(s)	Choi Min-jeong	South Korea	2:32.450	
3rd place, bronze medalist(s)	Corinne Stoddard	United States	2:32.578	
4	Yang Jingru	China	2:32.713	
5	Arianna Fontana	Italy	2:32.783	
6	Arianna Sighel	Italy	2:33.052	
7	Joey Lam Ching Yan	Hong Kong	2:35.755	
