= Christy Ren =

Hong Kong speed skater

- Chinese: 任家貝
- Born: August 5, 1983 (age 43); Hong Kong
- Education: Tufts University
- Occupation: Investment banker
- Known for: Olympic short track speed skater

Christy Ren (Chinese: 任家貝; Jyutping: jam^{6} gaa^{1} bui^{3}; born August 5, 1983) is a former short track speed skater Olympian representing Hong Kong at the 2002 Olympics. Ren is an investment banker with HSBC.

== Early life ==
On 05 Aug 1983, Ren was born in Hong Kong. At age 8, Ren started figure skating.

== Education ==
In 2002, as a freshman at Tufts University in Medford, Massachusetts, Ren competed in the 2002 Olympics. In 2005, Ren graduated from Tufts University.

== Career (Sport) ==
She competed at the 2002 Winter Olympics for Hong Kong. Along with teammate Cordia Tsoi Pop-Yee, they became the first athletes to represent Hong Kong at the Winter Olympics.

She was a member of the Hong Kong Speedskating Union.

After the 2002 Games, Ren has since left the sporting world and completed her studies at Tufts. Ren is working in investment banking with HSBC.

Ren is fluent in English, Cantonese and Mandarin.
