= Hong Kong at the 2022 Winter Olympics =

- Flag of Hong Kong
- IOC code: HKG
- NOC: Sports Federation and Olympic Committee of Hong Kong, China
- Website: www.hkolympic.org (in English)

in Beijing, China 4–20 February 2022
- Competitors: 3 (2 men and 1 woman) in 2 sports
- Flag bearer (opening): Sidney Chu
- Flag bearer (closing): Volunteer
- Medals: Gold 0 Silver 0 Bronze 0 Total 0

Winter Olympics appearances (overview)
- 2002; 2006; 2010; 2014; 2018; 2022; 2026

Hong Kong, a special administrative region (SAR) of the People's Republic of China, competed at the 2022 Winter Olympics in Beijing, China, from 4 to 20 February 2022. The delegation competed under the formal name Hong Kong, China (Chinese: 中國香港). This was the SAR's sixth appearance at a Winter Olympic Games, since its first appearance in 2002. Hong Kong's delegation to the 2022 Winter Olympics consisted of three athletes (two men and one woman) competing in two sports (alpine skiing and short track speed skating). This was the largest ever team Hong Kong has sent to the Winter Olympics. Sidney Chu was the country's flagbearer during the opening ceremony, whilst a volunteer was the flagbearer during the closing ceremony.

== Background ==
Hong Kong first competed in the Summer Olympic Games in 1952 and have since participated in every Summer Olympics except the boycotted 1980 Moscow Games. Hong Kong was a British colony until the 1997 transfer of sovereignty from the United Kingdom to the People's Republic of China. The SAR retained the right to send separate teams, under the name "Hong Kong, China", to the Olympics and other international sporting events that it possessed under British rule. Hong Kong made its Winter Olympic Games debut in 2002 at Salt Lake City. Hong Kong has never won a Winter Olympics medal. The Hong Kong delegation to the 2022 Winter Olympics, held from 4 to 20 February 2022 in Beijing, consisted of three athletes, alpine skier Adrian Yung and Audrey King, and short track speed skater Sidney Chu. This is Hong Kong's sixth appearance at a Winter Olympic Games and the largest ever team Hong Kong has sent to the Winter Olympics. Sidney Chu was the country's flagbearer during the opening ceremony, whilst a volunteer was the flagbearer during the closing ceremony.

== Competitors ==
The following is the list of the number of competitors participating at the Games per sport/discipline.

Sport	Men	Women	Total
Alpine skiing	1	1	2
Short track speed skating	1	0	1
Total	2	1	3

== Alpine skiing ==
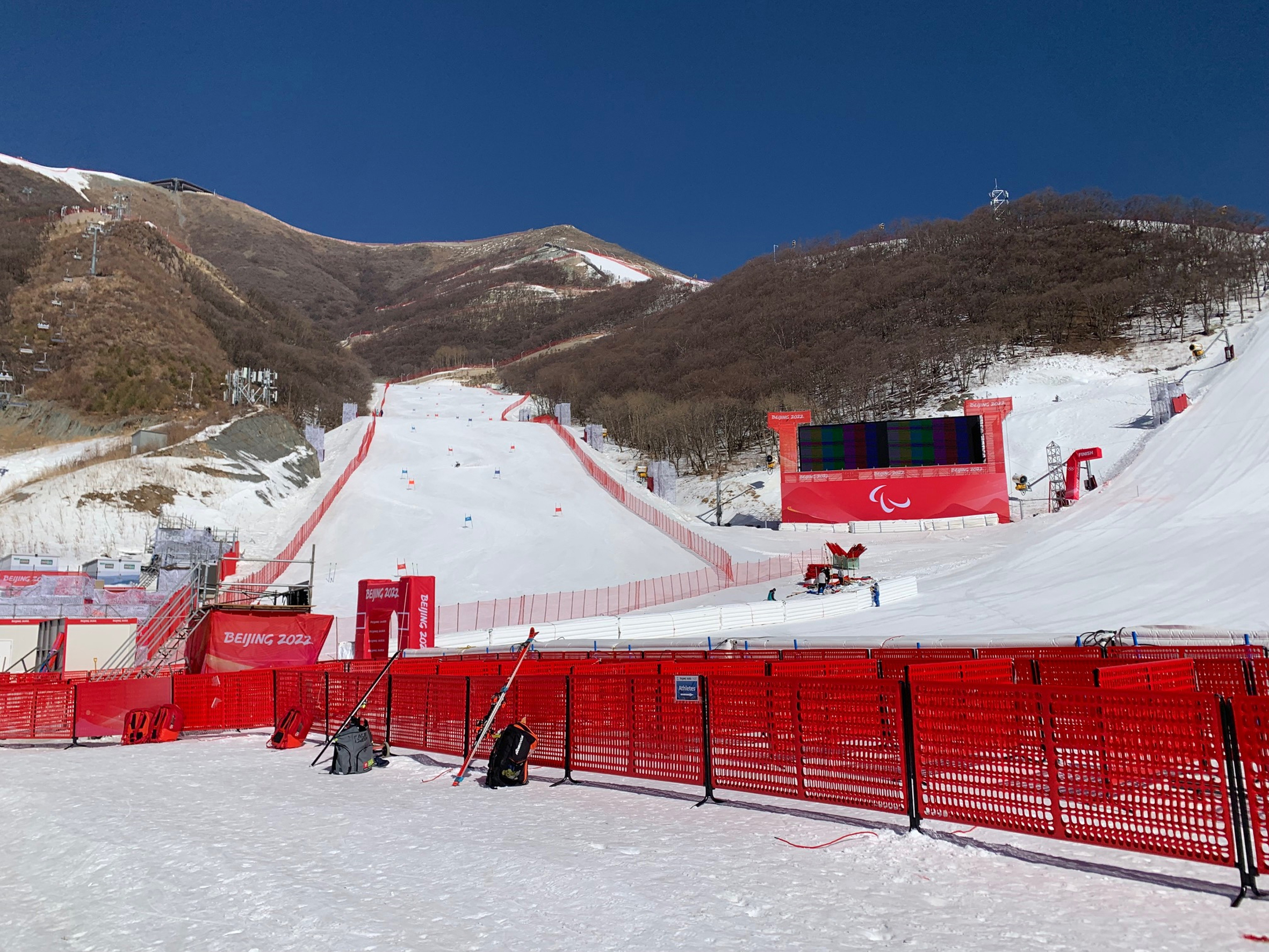
Yanqing National Alpine Skiing Centre, where the alpine skiing events were held.

By meeting the basic qualification standards, Hong Kong qualified one male and one female alpine skier. Audrey King, who had previously represented Hong Kong during the 2020 Winter Youth Olympic Games, and Adrian Yung both met the minimum standard requirements. King was 19 years old at the time of the Beijing Olympics. On 9 February, she participated in the women's slalom event. She missed a gate near the end and did not finish on the first run. Yung was 17 years old at the time of the Beijing Olympics. In an interview, Yung said that it was his childhood dream to participate in the Olympics, and he did not believe he could reach this so quickly. On 13 February, he participated in the men's giant slalom. He missed an early gate and did not finish on the first run. On 16 February, he participated in the men's slalom. He did not finish on the first run.

Athlete	Event	Run 1		Run 2		Total		Ref.
Athlete	Event	Time	Rank	Time	Rank	Time	Rank	Ref.
Adrian Yung	Men's giant slalom	DNF		Did not advance				
Adrian Yung	Men's slalom	DNF		Did not advance				
Audrey King	Women's slalom	DNF		Did not advance				

== Short track speed skating ==
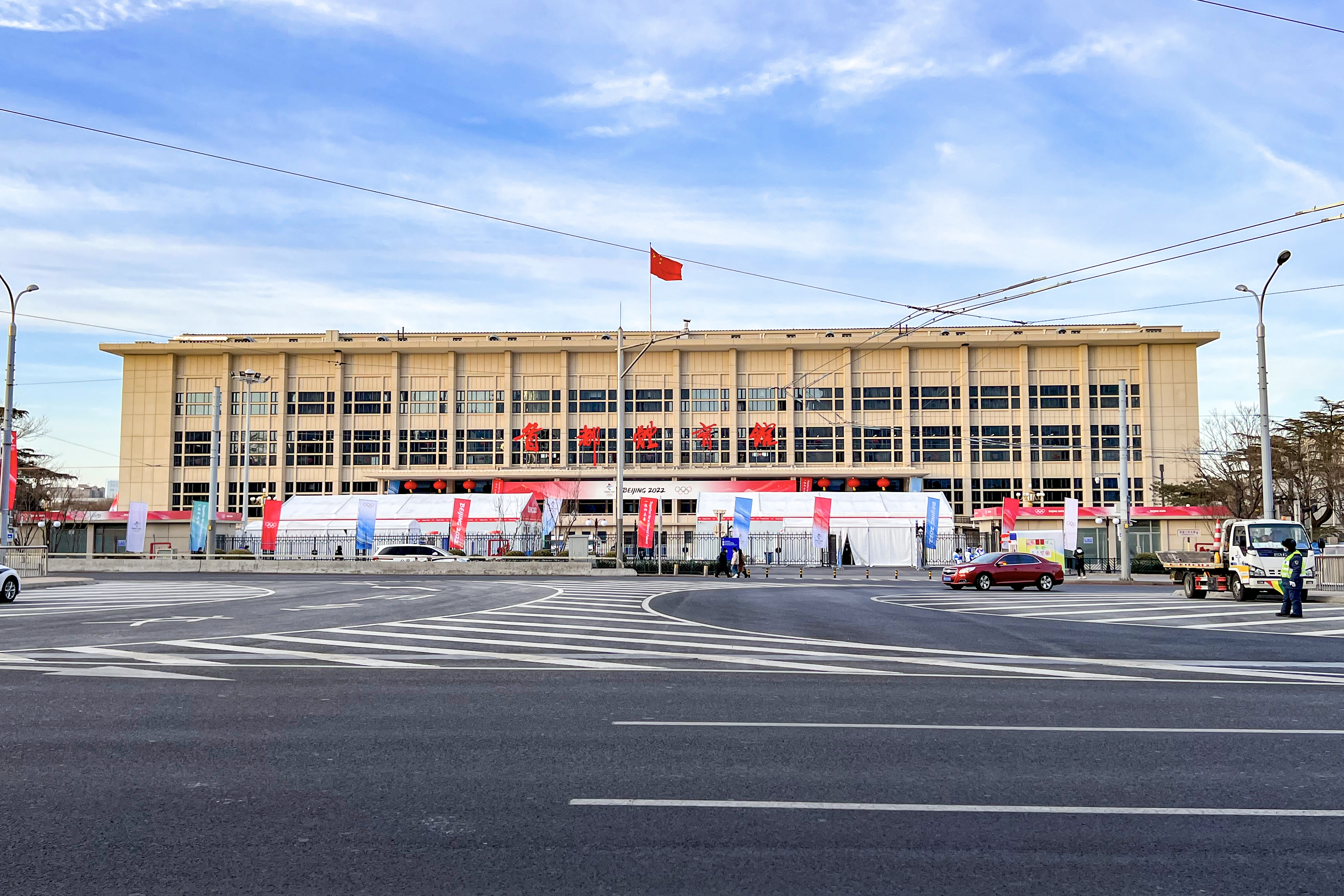
Capital Indoor Stadium, where the short track speed skating events were held.

Hong Kong qualified one male short track speed skater at the 2022 Winter Olympics. As Sui Xin, who originally obtained the quota place, had not obtained a HKSAR passport, Sidney Chu would represent Hong Kong during the 500m short track speed skating event in his place. Sidney Chu was 22 years old at the time of the Beijing Olympics. On 11 February, the heats (preliminary rounds) of the men's 500 meters race were held, Chu was assigned to heat eight. He finished his heat in third place with a time of 44.857 seconds and was eliminated as only the top two in each heat were allowed to proceed to the quarterfinals. He came 24th for this event. After the 2022 Winter Olympics, Chu serves as a executive director in a local speed skating academy aiming to improve the sport’s popularity.

Athlete	Event	Heat		Quarter-final		Semi-final		Final		Ref.
Athlete	Event	Time	Rank	Time	Rank	Time	Rank	Time	Rank	Ref.
Sidney Chu	500 m	44.857	3	Did not advance					24	

== See also ==
- Tropical nations at the Winter Olympics
- Hong Kong at the 2022 Asian Games
