= Adrian Yung =

Hong Kong skier, Olympian

Adrian Yung Hau Tsuen
Personal information
- Born: August 26, 2004 (age 22) Malaysia

Skiing career
- Sport: Alpine skiing ♂

Adrian Yung Hau Tsuen (Chinese: 翁厚全; born 26 Aug 2004) is an alpine skier who represents Hong Kong. He was born in Malaysia and raised in UK. He represented Hong Kong in the 2022 Winter Olympics in Beijing and in the 2026 Winter Olympics in Italy.

Yung was the first male alpine skier representing Hong Kong in the Olympics.

== Early life ==
Yung was born on 26 August 2004 in Malaysia and raised in the United Kingdom. He began skiing at the age of two during a family vacation in Japan, where he took his first lesson. By age 12, he joined the Hong Kong ski team, becoming one of its top prospects. Yung balances his athletic career with academic pursuits, developing interests in scientific fields such as climate change and marine ecology.

== Career ==
Yung has competed in the giant slalom and slalom disciplines. Yung's competitive experience included participating in the 2019 Winter Children of Asia International Sports Games in Yuzhno-Sakhalinsk, Russia, where he represented Hong Kong. He finished in tenth place in men's slalom at the 2025 Asian Winter Games.

=== 2022 Winter Olympics ===
In December 2021, Yung qualified for the 2022 Winter Olympics in Beijing by meeting the basic qualification standards in slalom and giant slalom events, becoming the first male alpine skier to represent Hong Kong at the Winter Olympics.

At the Games, he competed in the men's giant slalom on 13 February 2022 but did not finish (DNF) due to challenging conditions and nerves. He also entered the men's slalom on 16 February but again recorded a DNF. Despite the results, Yung described the experience as motivational, aiming to improve for future competitions.

=== 2026 Winter Olympics ===
Yung again qualified for the 2026 Olympics. He competed in the men's giant slalom, finishing 72nd. He recorded a DNF in the Alpine skiing at the 2026 Winter Olympics – Men's slalom.
