= Arabella Ng =

Hong Kong alpine skier (born 2001)

Personal information
- National team: Hong Kong
- Citizenship: Hong Kong; Canadian
- Born: 8 October 2001 (age 24) Hong Kong

Sport
- Country: Hong Kong
- Sport: Alpine skiing

Achievements and titles
- Olympic finals: 2018 Winter Olympics

Arabella Ng
- Traditional Chinese: 吳一里
- Simplified Chinese: 吴一里
Transcriptions
Yue: Cantonese
- Jyutping: Ng4 Jat1lei5
- IPA: [ŋ̭̍ jɐ́t̚ le̬i]

Arabella Caroline Yili Ng (Chinese: 吳一里; Jyutping: Ng4 Jat1lei5; Cantonese pronunciation: [ŋ̭̍ jɐ́t̚ le̬i]; born 8 October 2001 in Hong Kong) is an alpine skier and the sole athlete who competed for Hong Kong at the 2018 Winter Olympics.

Ng is the niece of Fenella Ng, a Hong Kong swimmer and rower who competed at the 1984 and the 1988 Summer Olympics, as well as a rower at the 2000 Summer Olympics. Her uncle, Michael Tse, is a rower who competed for Hong Kong at the 1996 Summer Olympics in Atlanta. Her aunt and uncle are also active on various sporting committees, including the Hong Kong Triathlon Association.

== Early life ==
Ng was born in Hong Kong and at a young age moved to Whistler, British Columbia, Canada. She took up skiing with the Whistler Mountain Ski Club at a young age — she now attends the Green Mountain Valley School in Vermont.

== FIS tournaments ==
Ng competed in her first FIS tournament in 2017. She ranked 13th in the women's giant slalom and 28th in women's slalom in Sun Peaks, British Columbia. Her best at the Sunday River Resort tournament in slalom was 16th, and 42nd in giant slalom. Arabella then competed at Gore Mountain, New York in January 2018, where she ranked 22nd in giant slalom and 22nd in Super G.

== 2018 Winter Olympics ==
On 25 December 2017, Ng discovered that she will be the only representative from Hong Kong at the games; she is the first athlete from Hong Kong to compete in skiing at the Winter Olympics. She was the flag bearer for Hong Kong in the 2018 Winter Olympics Parade of Nations.

Ng competed in the Women's Giant Slalom and Women's Slalom.
