= Hong Kong at the 2014 Winter Olympics =

- IOC code: HKG
- NOC: Sports Federation and Olympic Committee of Hong Kong, China
- Website: www.hkolympic.org (in Chinese and English)

in Sochi
- Competitors: 1 (1 man) in 1 sport
- Flag bearer: Barton Lui Pan-To
- Medals: Gold 0 Silver 0 Bronze 0 Total 0

Winter Olympics appearances (overview)
- 2002; 2006; 2010; 2014; 2018; 2022; 2026

Hong Kong, a special administrative region (SAR) of the People's Republic of China, sent a delegation to compete at the 2014 Winter Olympics in Sochi, Russia from 7 to 23 February 2014. The delegation competed under the name "Hong Kong, China" (中國香港). This was the SAR's fourth appearance at a Winter Olympics. Barton Lui Pan-To was the only athlete to represent the nation, competing in short track speed skating. Three officials were also a part of the delegation.

== Background ==
Hong Kong began competing in the Summer Olympic Games in 1952, and have participated in every Summer Olympics since, excluding the boycotted 1980 Moscow Games. Hong Kong was a British colony until the 1997 transfer of sovereignty from the United Kingdom to the People's Republic of China. The SAR retained the right to send separate teams to the Olympics and other international sporting events that it possessed under British rule. Hong Kong made its Winter Olympic Games debut in 2002 at Salt Lake City. Hong Kong has never won a Winter Olympic medal. For the 2014 Sochi Olympics held from 7 to 23 February 2014, the SAR's delegation consisted of one short-track speed skater, Barton Lui Pan-To. Lui was chosen as the flag bearer for the opening ceremony, while a ceremony volunteer carried the flag at the closing ceremony. Three officials were also a part of the delegation: Timothy T.T. Fok, President of the Sports Federation & Olympic Committee of Hong Kong, China; Ronnie M. C. Wong, the Chef de Mission; and Chung Pang, Honorary Secretary General of the Hong Kong Olympic Committee.

== Competitors ==
| Sport | Men | Women | Total |
|---|---|---|---|
| Short track speed skating | 1 | 0 | 1 |
| Total | 1 | 0 | 1 |

== Short track speed skating ==
Hong Kong received one quota place. Barton Lui Pan-To became the first male athlete to represent Hong Kong at the Winter Olympics. This was his only time participating in the Olympics.

Lui was 20 years old at the time of the Sochi Olympics. On 10 February, he competed in the men's 1500 m heat two and finished in 5th place out of 6 athletes with a time of 2 minute and 22 seconds. He did not advance to the semifinal and placed 30th overall (out of 36 athletes). Hong Kong did not win a medal at these Games.

| Athlete | Event | Heat | | Semifinal | | Final | |
| Athlete | Event | Time | Rank | Time | Rank | Time | Rank |
|---|---|---|---|---|---|---|---|
| Barton Lui Pan-To | Men's 1500 m | 2:22.139 | 5 | did not advance | | | 30 |

== See also ==
- Hong Kong at the 2014 Asian Games
- Hong Kong at the 2014 Summer Youth Olympics
