= Hong Kong at the 2006 Winter Olympics =

- IOC code: HKG
- NOC: Sports Federation and Olympic Committee of Hong Kong, China
- Website: www.hkolympic.org (in Chinese and English)

in Turin
- Competitors: 1 (1 woman) in 1 sport
- Flag bearers: Han Yueshuang (opening and closing)
- Medals: Gold 0 Silver 0 Bronze 0 Total 0

Winter Olympics appearances (overview)
- 2002; 2006; 2010; 2014; 2018; 2022; 2026

Hong Kong, a special administrative region (SAR) of the People's Republic of China, sent a delegation to compete at the 2006 Winter Olympics in Turin, Italy from 10 to 26 February 2006. The delegation competed under the formal name Hong Kong, China (Chinese: 中國香港). This was the SAR's second appearance at a Winter Olympic Games, and the delegation consisted of a single athlete, short track speed skater Han Yueshuang. Entered in three events, her best performance was 18th in the women's 1,000 metres race.

== Background ==
Hong Kong began competing in the Summer Olympic Games in 1952, and have participated in every Summer Olympics since, excluding the boycotted 1980 Moscow Games. Hong Kong was a British colony until the 1997 transfer of sovereignty from the United Kingdom to the People's Republic of China. The SAR retained the right to send separate teams to the Olympics and other international sporting events that it had enjoyed under British rule. Hong Kong made its Winter Olympic Games debut in 2002 at Salt Lake City. Hong Kong has never won a Winter Olympics medal. The Hong Kong delegation to Turin consisted of a single athlete, short track speed skater Han Yueshuang. She was the flag bearer for both the opening ceremony and the closing ceremony.

== Short track speed skating ==
Han Yueshuang was 23 years old at the time of the Turin Olympics. On 12 February, the heats of the women's 500 metres race were held, Han was assigned to heat six. She finished her heat in fourth place with a time of 47.087 seconds, and was eliminated as only the top two in each heat were allowed to proceed to the quarterfinals. She was ranked 24th for this event. On 18 February, she was placed into the fourth heat of the women's 1500 metres, where she finished with a time of 2 minutes and 36.233 seconds, fifth in her heat. Only the top three from each heat proceeded to the quarterfinals, and Han was eliminated in 24th place. In the heats for the women's 1000 metres held on 22 February, she finished third in the fourth heat with a time of 1 minute and 37.883 seconds, but again, only the top two in each heat could proceed to the quarterfinals. Han was officially classified in 18th place. She would later represent Hong Kong again at the 2010 Winter Olympics.

Athlete	Event	Heat		Quarterfinal		Semifinal		Final	
Athlete	Event	Time	Rank	Time	Rank	Time	Rank	Time	Rank
Han Yueshuang	Women's 500 m	47.087	4	did not advance					24
Han Yueshuang	Women's 1000 m	1:37.883	3	did not advance					18
Han Yueshuang	Women's 1500 m	2:36.233	5	did not advance					24

== See also ==
- Hong Kong at the 2006 Asian Games
