= Björgvin Björgvinsson =

Björgvin Björgvinsson may refer to:

- Björgvin Björgvinsson (handballer) (born 1949), Icelandic handball player
- Björgvin Björgvinsson (skier) (born 1980), Icelandic skier
