= Hong Kong at the 2026 Winter Olympics =

- Flag of Hong Kong
- IOC code: HKG
- NOC: Sports Federation and Olympic Committee of Hong Kong, China
- Website: www.hkolympic.org (in English)

in Milan and Cortina d'Ampezzo, Italy 6 February 2026 – 22 February 2026
- Competitors: 4 (2 men and 2 women) in 2 sports
- Flag bearers (opening): Darren Kwok Tsz Fung; Eloise Yung Shih King
- Flag bearer (closing): Volunteer
- Medals: Gold 0 Silver 0 Bronze 0 Total 0

Winter Olympics appearances (overview)
- 2002; 2006; 2010; 2014; 2018; 2022; 2026

Hong Kong, a special administrative region (SAR) of the People's Republic of China, competed at the 2026 Winter Olympics in Milan and Cortina d'Ampezzo, Italy, from 6 to 22 February 2026. The delegation competed under the formal name Hong Kong, China (Chinese: 中國香港). This was the SAR's 7th appearance at a Winter Olympic Games, since its first appearance in 2002.

The delegation to the 2026 Winter Olympics consisted of four athletes (two men and two woman) competing in two sports (alpine skiing and short-track speed skating). This was the largest ever team Hong Kong has sent to the Winter Olympics. Darren Kwok Tsz Fung and Eloise Yung Shih King were the country's flagbearer during the opening ceremony. Meanwhile, a volunteer was the country's flagbearer during the closing ceremony.

== Background ==
Hong Kong began competing in the Summer Olympic Games in 1952, and have participated in every Summer Olympics since, excluding the boycotted 1980 Moscow Games. Hong Kong was a British colony until the 1997 transfer of sovereignty from the United Kingdom to the People's Republic of China. The SAR retained the right to send separate teams to the Olympics and other international sporting events that it had enjoyed under British rule. Hong Kong made its Winter Olympic Games debut in 2002 at Salt Lake City. Hong Kong has never won a Winter Olympics medal.

== Competitors ==
The following is the list of number of competitors participating at the Games per sport/discipline.

Sport	Men	Women	Total
Alpine skiing	1	1	2
Short-track speed skating	1	1	2
Total	2	2	4

== Alpine skiing ==
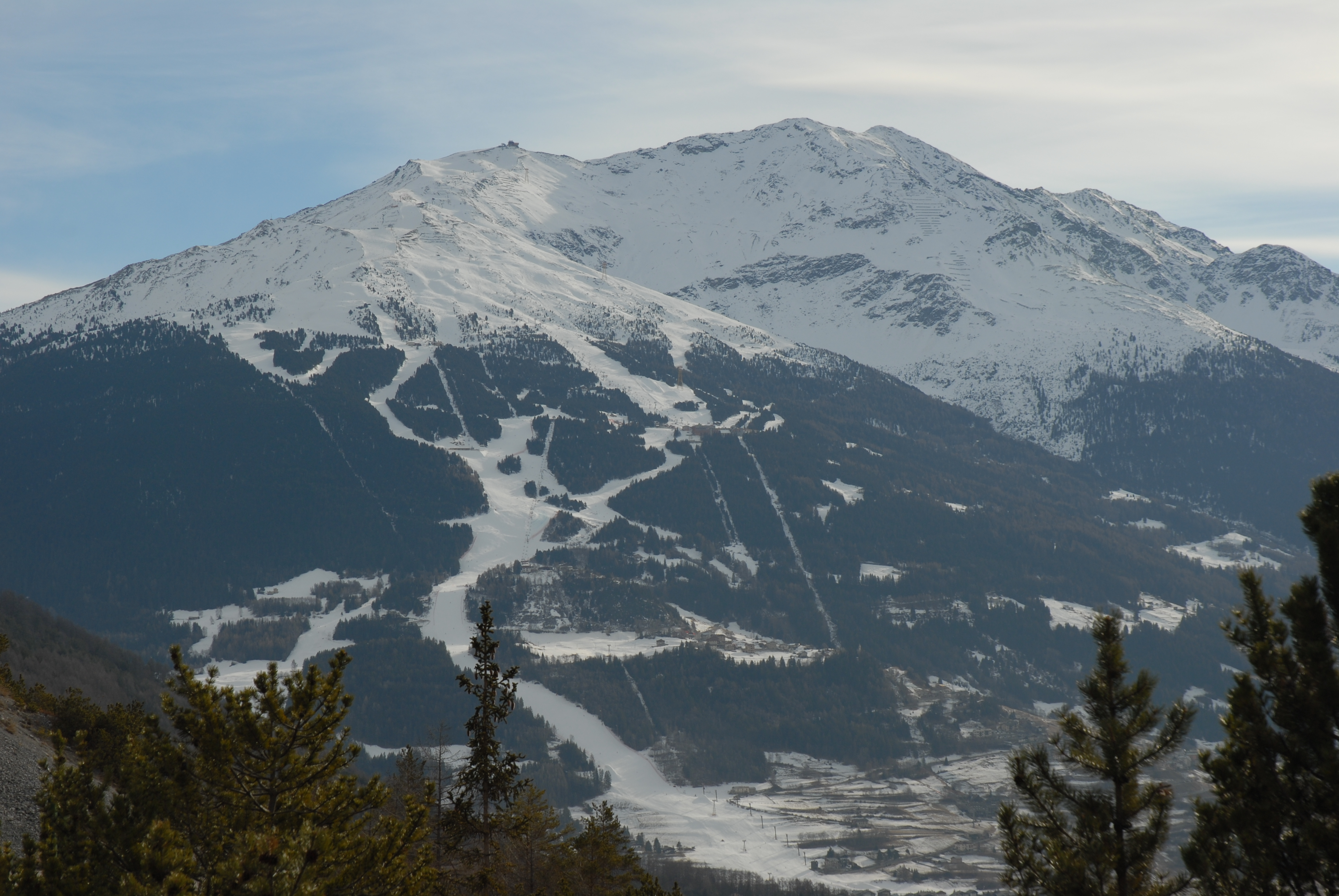
Stelvio hosted the men's alpine skiing events

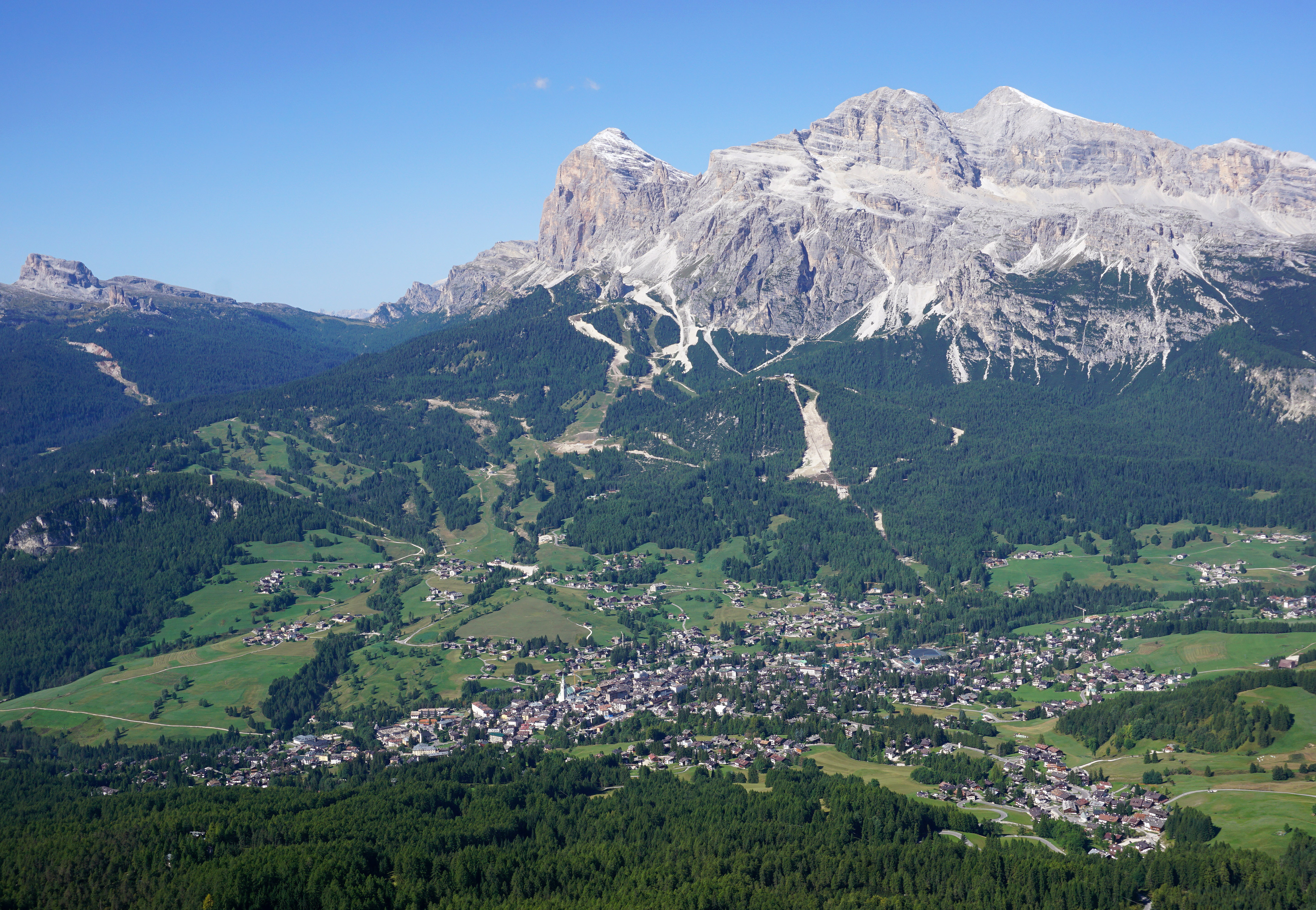
Olimpia delle Tofane hosted the women's alpine skiing events

Hong Kong qualified one male and one female alpine skier, with Adrian Yung and Eloise King both earning qualification through the basic quota.

Athlete	Event	Run 1		Run 2		Total		Ref.
Athlete	Event	Time	Rank	Time	Rank	Time	Rank	Ref.
Hau Tsuen Adrian Yung	Men's giant slalom	1:31.22	72	1:24.99	69	2:56.21	68	
Hau Tsuen Adrian Yung	Men's slalom	DNF						
Eloise Yung Shih King	Women's slalom	1:04.16	62	DNF				

== Short-track speed skating ==
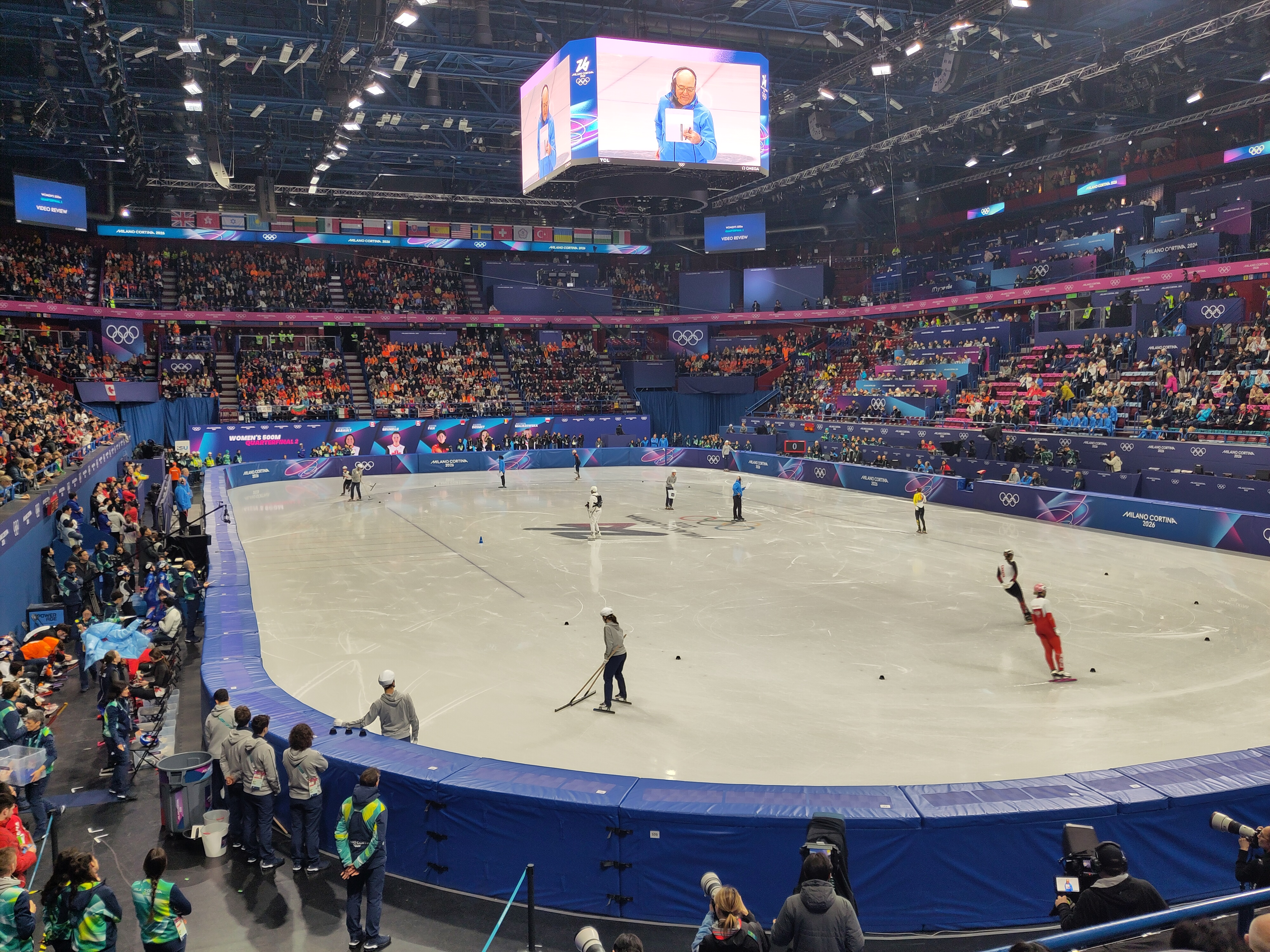
The Milano Ice Skating Arena hosted the short track speed skating events

Hong Kong qualified one male short-track speed skater after the conclusion of the 2025–26 ISU Short Track World Tour. Originally, Joey Lam Ching Yan would have qualified for the women's 1500 metres event, but due to the quota being exceeded, the ISU removed her quota spot. Later, Great Britain declined its quota in the event, which allowed Lam to compete.

Darren Kwok Tsz Fung and Joey Lam Ching Yan were both confirmed to be competing within their respective events. Lam Ching‑yan finished 7th in the final of the women’s 1,500 metres short-track speed skating, the city’s best finish yet at the Winter Olympics.

Athlete	Event	Heat		Quarterfinal		Semifinal		Final		Ref.
Athlete	Event	Time	Rank	Time	Rank	Time	Rank	Time	Rank	Ref.
Darren Kwok Tsz Fung	Men's 1000 m	1:27.237	4	Did not advance						
Darren Kwok Tsz Fung	Men's 1500 m	—N/a		2:25.707	6	Did not advance				
Joey Lam Ching Yan	Women's 1500 m	—N/a		2:29.027	4 q	2:37.290	2 QA	2:35.755	7	

== See also ==
- Tropical nations at the Winter Olympics
