= Cordia Tsoi =

Hong Kong speed skater

Ye Tso is a Hong Kong former short track speed skater who competed for Hong Kong at the 2002 Winter Olympics. Along with teammate Christy Ren, they became the first athletes to represent Hong Kong at the Winter Olympics.

Tso was born in Canada, but grew up in Hong Kong and attended Canadian International School. She competed in Kung Fu (Hong Kong National Team in Wushu 1999–2002) and Triathlon before embarking on a career in speedskating.

Tso is fluent in English, Cantonese, Mandarin and French.
