= Joey Lam Ching Yan =

Hong Kong short track speed skater

Personal information
- Born: Lam Ching Yan; 2 March 2006 (age 20) Hong Kong

Sport
- Sport: Short track speed skating

Lam Ching Yan (born 2 March 2006 in Hong Kong), also known as Joey Lam or Joey Lam Ching‑yan, is a short track speed skater. She represented Hong Kong at the 2026 Winter Olympics, competing in the 1500 m event. In the quarter-finals, she qualified for the next round as the second fastest of all fourth-placed athletes. In the semi-finals, she finished second in her heat and thus reached the A final. Finishing seventh overall, she achieved the best result ever for an athlete competing for Hong Kong at the Winter Olympics.

== Personal records ==
Distance	Nation	City	Date	Record Time
500 meters	Italy	Bormio	16 November 2024	43.956
1000 meters	China	Shanghai	10 March 2023	1:34.058
1500 meters	Canada	Montreal	1 November 2024	2:22.074
