= Hong Kong at the 2010 Winter Olympics =

- IOC code: HKG
- NOC: Sports Federation and Olympic Committee of Hong Kong, China
- Website: www.hkolympic.org (in Chinese and English)

in Vancouver
- Competitors: 1 in 1 sport
- Flag bearers: Han Yueshuang (opening and closing)
- Medals: Gold 0 Silver 0 Bronze 0 Total 0

Winter Olympics appearances (overview)
- 2002; 2006; 2010; 2014; 2018; 2022; 2026

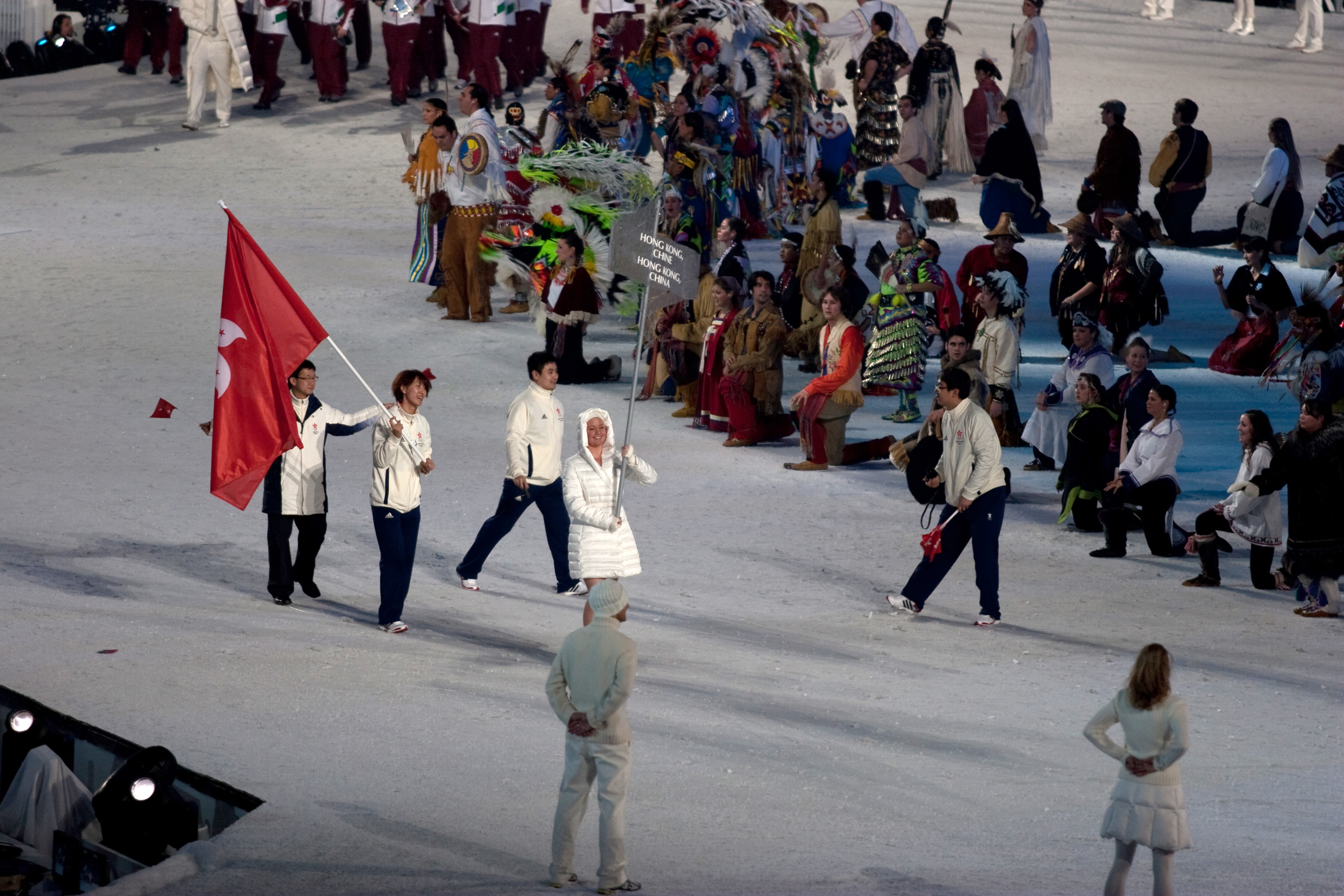
The athlete entering the stadium during the opening ceremonies.

Hong Kong, a special administrative region (SAR) of the People's Republic of China, sent a delegation to compete at the 2010 Winter Olympics in Vancouver, British Columbia, Canada from 12–28 February 2010. The delegation competed under the name "Hong Kong, China" (中國香港). This was the SAR's third appearance at a Winter Olympics, and the delegation consisted of a single short-track speed skater, Han Yueshuang. Han's best performance was 24th in the women's 500 metres.

== Background ==
Hong Kong began competing in the Summer Olympic Games in 1952, and have participated in every Summer Olympics since, excluding the boycotted 1980 Moscow Games. Hong Kong was a British colony until the 1997 transfer of sovereignty from the United Kingdom to the People's Republic of China. The SAR retained the right to send separate teams to the Olympics and other international sporting events that it had enjoyed under British rule. Hong Kong made its Winter Olympic Games debut in 2002 at Salt Lake City. Hong Kong has never won a Winter Olympics medal. For the 2010 Vancouver Olympics, the SAR's delegation consisted of one short-track speed skater, Han Yueshuang. Han was chosen as the flag bearer for both the opening ceremony and the closing ceremony.

== Short track speed skating ==
Han Yueshuang was 27 years old at the time of the Vancouver Olympics. She had previously been the only competitor to represent Hong Kong at the 2006 Winter Olympics. She competed in three events, the 500, 1,000, and 1,500 metre races. On 13 February, in the 500 metres, she was drawn into the 8th heat, and placed third in her heat with a time of 48 seconds. She did not advance to the quarterfinals, and was placed 24th for the event. On 20 February, she participated in the 1,500 metres event, in heat two, she came in last with a time of 2 minutes and 35 seconds, which placed her 32nd for the event. In the 1,000 metres on 24 February, she placed fourth in heat seven, with a time of 1 minute and 38 seconds. This put her in 27th rank for the event.

| Athlete | Event | Heat | | Quarterfinal | | Semifinal | | Final | |
| Athlete | Event | Time | Rank | Time | Rank | Time | Rank | Time | Rank |
|---|---|---|---|---|---|---|---|---|---|
| Han Yueshuang | Women's 500 m | 48.625 | 3 | did not advance | | | | | 24 |
| Han Yueshuang | Women's 1000 m | 1:38.115 | 4 | did not advance | | | | | 27 |
| Han Yueshuang | Women's 1500 m | 2:35.742 | 6 | did not advance | | | | | 32 |

== See also ==
- Hong Kong at the 2010 Asian Games
- Hong Kong at the 2010 Summer Youth Olympics
