= Hong Kong at the 2002 Winter Olympics =

- IOC code: HKG
- NOC: Sports Federation and Olympic Committee of Hong Kong, China
- Website: www.hkolympic.org (in Chinese and English)

in Salt Lake City
- Competitors: 2 (2 women) in 1 sport
- Flag bearers: Cordia Tsoi (opening and closing)
- Medals: Gold 0 Silver 0 Bronze 0 Total 0

Winter Olympics appearances (overview)
- 2002; 2006; 2010; 2014; 2018; 2022; 2026

Hong Kong, a special administrative region (SAR) of the People's Republic of China, competed at the Winter Olympic Games for the first time at the 2002 Winter Olympics for Hong Kong in Salt Lake City, United States from 8 to 24 February 2002. This delegation, separated from the China team that consisted of athletes from mainland China only, competed under the name Hong Kong, China (Chinese: 中國香港). This was the SAR's first appearance at a Winter Olympic Games. The delegation consisted of two athletes, Tsoi Po Yee "Cordia" (蔡寶儀) and Christy Ren (任家貝). Both of them competed in the short track speed skating event.

== Background ==
Hong Kong began competing in the Summer Olympic Games in 1952, and have participated in every Summer Olympics since, excluding the boycotted 1980 Moscow Games. Hong Kong was a British colony until the 1997 transfer of sovereignty from the United Kingdom to the People's Republic of China. The SAR retained the right to send separate teams, under the name "Hong Kong, China", to the Olympics and other international sporting events that it possessed under British rule. In this 2002 Winter Olympics held from 8 to 24 February in Salt Lake City, Hong Kong made its Winter Olympic Games debut. Hong Kong has never won a Winter Olympics medal. The Hong Kong delegation to Salt Lake City consisted of two athletes, Tsoi Po Yee and Christy Ren. Both of them competed in the short track speed skating event. Tsoi was chosen as the flag bearer for both the opening ceremony and the closing ceremony.

== Short track speed skating ==
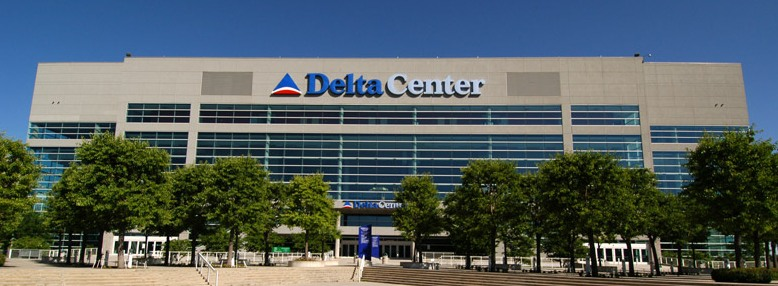
Delta Center, where the short track speed skating events were held.

Born in Canada, Tsoi Po Yee "Cordia" was 17 years old at the time of the Salt Lake City Olympics. Christy Ren, born in Hong Kong, was 18 years old. Both of them were making their Olympic debut. Both Tsoi and Ren participated in the women's 500 m and 1000 m short track, while Ren also participated in women's 1500 m short track.

On 13 February, Ren competed in the women's 1500 metres short track. She was assigned to heat one. She finished in 2 minutes and 49.666 seconds, finishing last in her group of six skaters. This result was not high enough to advance, and she was placed 26th overall. On 16 February, both Tsoi and Ren took part in the women's 500 metres short track. Tsoi was assigned to heat two. She finished in 52.496 seconds, placed 3rd out of 3 in her heat. Only the top two in each heat were allowed to advance to the quarterfinal, and therefore Tsoi did not advance, placed 24th overall. Ren, in the heat seven, finished in 55.423 seconds, placed 4th out of 4 in her heat, did not advance and was placed 29th overall. On 20 February, both Tsoi and Ren took part in the women's 1000 metres short track. Tsoi, racing in the third heat, finished in 1 minute and 48.445 seconds, placed 3rd out of 4 in her heat. Like the 500 metres race, only the top two in each heat were allowed to advance to the quarterfinal, and therefore Tsoi did not advance. She was placed 22 overall. Ren was assigned to heat one. She finished in 1 minute and 50.094 seconds, finishing third out of three, did not advance and was placed 23 overall. Hong Kong team did not win any medals in this Winter Olympic Game.

After the Olympics, Ren founded a speed skating school in Hong Kong to provide training to local youths.

Athlete	Event	Heat		Quarterfinal		Semifinal		Final		Ref.
Athlete	Event	Time	Rank	Time	Rank	Time	Rank	Time	Rank	Ref.
Cordia Tsoi	Women's 500 m short track	52.496	3	did not advance					24	
Cordia Tsoi	Women's 1000 m short track	1:48.445	3	did not advance					22	
Christy Ren	Women's 500 m short track	55.423	4	did not advance					29	
Christy Ren	Women's 1000 m short track	1:50.094	3	did not advance					23	
Christy Ren	Women's 1500 m short track	2:49.666	6	did not advance					26	

== See also ==
- Sport in Hong Kong
- Hong Kong at the 2002 Asian Games
