= Hong Kong at the 2018 Winter Olympics =

- Flag of Hong Kong
- IOC code: HKG
- NOC: Sports Federation and Olympic Committee of Hong Kong, China
- Website: www.hkolympic.org (in English)

in Pyeongchang, South Korea 9–25 February 2018
- Competitors: 1 in 1 sport
- Flag bearer: Arabella Ng
- Medals: Gold 0 Silver 0 Bronze 0 Total 0

Winter Olympics appearances (overview)
- 2002; 2006; 2010; 2014; 2018; 2022; 2026

Hong Kong, a special administrative region (SAR) of the People's Republic of China, sent a delegation to compete at the 2018 Winter Olympics in Pyeongchang, South Korea, from 9 to 25 February 2018. The delegation competed under the name "Hong Kong, China" (中國香港). This was the SAR's 5th appearance at a Winter Olympics. Hong Kong's team consisted of one female alpine skier, Arabella Ng.

== Background ==
Hong Kong first competed in the Summer Olympic Games in 1952, and have since participated in every Summer Olympics except the boycotted 1980 Moscow Games. Hong Kong was a British colony until the 1997 transfer of sovereignty from the United Kingdom to the People's Republic of China. The SAR retained the right to send separate teams, under the name "Hong Kong, China", to the Olympics and other international sporting events that it possessed under British rule. Hong Kong made its Winter Olympic Games debut in 2002 at Salt Lake City. Hong Kong has never won a Winter Olympics medal. 2018 Pyeongchang Olympics was the SAR's 5th appearance at a Winter Olympics. For this Olympics held from 9 to 25 February 2018, the SAR's delegation consisted of one alpine skier, Arabella Ng.

In the Parade of Nations, teams marched in based on their names in the traditional Korean Hangul alphabet, which placed Hong Kong last before the host nation. Ng was chosen as the flag bearer for the opening ceremony. A volunteer carried the flag for the closing ceremony.

== Competitors ==
The following is the list of number of competitors participating in the Hong Kong delegation per sport.

Sport	Men	Women	Total
Alpine skiing	0	1	1
Total	0	1	1

== Alpine skiing ==
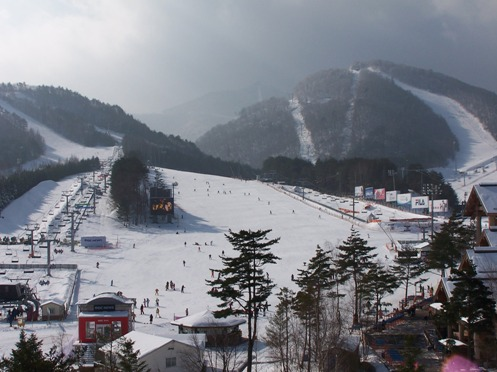
PyeongChang Dragon Valley ski resort, where the alpine skiing events were held.

Hong Kong qualified one female athlete, Arabella Ng. This is the first time Hong Kong competed in alpine skiing, as it has only competed in short track speed skating at its first four appearances. Ng came from an Olympics family. Her aunt, Fenella Ng, competed in the 1984, 1988 and 2000 Summer Olympics. Her uncle, Michael Tse, competed in the 1996 Summer Olympics. They travelled to Pyeongchang to support Arabella.

Ng was 16 years old at the time of the Pyeongchang Olympics. On 15 February, she competed in the women's giant slalom and finished with a time of 1 minute and 27 seconds in the first run and 1 minute and 23 seconds in the second run. This placed her at the 56th overall. On 16 February, she competed in the women's slalom but did not finish the event.

Athlete	Event	Run 1		Run 2		Total	
Athlete	Event	Time	Rank	Time	Rank	Time	Rank
Arabella Ng	Women's giant slalom	1:27:25	63	1:23:29	55	2:50:54	56
Arabella Ng	Women's slalom	DNF					

== See also ==
- Hong Kong at the 2017 Asian Winter Games
- Hong Kong at the 2018 Asian Games
- Hong Kong at the 2018 Summer Youth Olympics
