= Alpine skiing at the 2022 Winter Olympics – Qualification =

The following is about the qualification rules and the quota allocation for the alpine skiing events at the 2022 Winter Olympics.

== Qualification rules ==
=== Quotas ===
A maximum of 306 athletes are allowed to compete at the Olympic Games. A maximum of 22 athletes per nation will be allowed to compete with a maximum of 11 males or 11 females from a nation being permitted. A nation may not enter more than four athletes in any single event. Each nation may also enter a maximum of one team in the Mixed Team Parallel event.

To qualify a nation must have at least one athlete meet basic eligibility requirements of age, medical fitness, and be under the prescribed maximum points on the FIS points list that takes into account results from July 1, 2019, to January 16, 2022. The Points List is calculated by taking the average of five best event results for technical events (giant slalom and slalom) and two best results for speed events (downhill, super G, and super combined). To compete in giant slalom or slalom an athlete must have a point average of less than 160 in those disciplines. To compete in downhill or super G an athlete must have a point total less than 80 disciplines. To compete in super combined an athlete must have a point average less than 160, but a point average of less than 80 in downhill.

On January 24, 2022, the IOC granted four extra male quotas while the FIS began investigating the legitimacy of some low level qualifying events.

=== Allocation of quotas ===
Basic quota

Every NOC will be assigned one male and one female quota spot meeting the minimum basic standards.

Host nation

The host nation (China) is awarded an additional quota per gender, granted all athletes meet the standard above.

Top 30 on Points list

Every NOC with at least one male and/or female in the top 30 of any event will be allocated one additional male and/or female quota in addition to the basic quota. If an athlete is ranked in the top 30 in more than one event a second additional quota for that sex will be given or if two different athletes are in the top 30.

Remaining quotas

The remaining quotas will be assigned using the Olympic Quota allocation list on 16 January 2022. The spots will be assigned until a maximum of 306 quotas are reached including the above. When a nation reaches its maximum, remaining athletes from that country will be skipped over. The list is a table of athletes in the top 500 in their two best events (including both male and female athletes). These additional quotas are gender specific, and will be used to create a maximum of 153 male and 153 female competitors.

An athlete can be counted only once for the above criteria. For example, if a country has only one athlete meeting all three criteria then only one quota will be given (not 3).

Team event

The top 16 nations in the overall FIS World Cup Nations Standings as of 17 January 2022 will permitted to enter a team of two male and two female athletes in the mixed team event. If China is not among the top 16, then the top 15 along with China will qualify. In the event one of these nations have only 3 quota spots earned above then they will be awarded a fourth quota to allow them to participate in the team event in addition to the prescribed total of 306.

== Qualification summary ==
As of 30 January 2022.

Nations	Women (basic + top 30)	Men (basic + top 30)	Additional women	Additional men	Team event	Athletes
Albania		1				1
Andorra	1	1				2
Argentina	1	1				2
Armenia		1				1
Australia	2	1	1			4
Austria	3	3	8	8	Yes	22
Belarus	1	~~1~~				1
Belgium	~~1~~	3				3
Bolivia		1				1
Bosnia and Herzegovina	1	1	1			3
Brazil		1				1
Bulgaria	1	2				3
Canada	3	3	5	2	Yes	13
Chile	1	1				2
China	2 (Note: China qualifies one additional male and female quota by status as host.)	2			Yes	4
Chinese Taipei	1	1				2
Colombia		1				1
Croatia	2	3	1			6
Cyprus		1				1
Czech Republic	3	2	3		Yes	8
Denmark	~~1~~	1				1
Timor-Leste		1				1
Ecuador	1					1
Eritrea		1				1
Estonia	1	1				2
Finland	1	1	2			4
France	3	3	5	7	Yes	18
Georgia	1	1				2
Germany	3	3	~~4~~ 2	5	Yes	13
Ghana		1				1
Great Britain	2	2			Yes	4
Greece	1	1				2
Haiti		1				1
Hong Kong	1	1				2
Hungary	1	1				2
Iceland	1	1				2
India		1				1
Iran	1	1				2
Ireland	1	1				2
Israel	1	~~2~~ 1				2
Italy	3	3	6	4	Yes	16
Jamaica		1				1
Japan	1	1	1			3
Kazakhstan	1	1				2
Kosovo	1	1				2
Kyrgyzstan		1				1
Latvia	1	1				2
Lebanon	1	1				2
Liechtenstein	~~2~~	1				1
Lithuania	1	1				2
Luxembourg	1	1				2
Madagascar	1	1				1
Malaysia	1	1				2
Mexico	1	1				2
Monaco		1				1
Montenegro	1	1				2
Morocco		1				1
Netherlands	1	1				2
New Zealand	~~3~~ 1	~~1~~				1
North Macedonia		1				1
Norway	3	3	~~6~~ 1	7	Yes	14
Pakistan	~~1~~	1				1
Peru	1					1
Philippines		1				1
Poland	3	1	1	1 (Note: One additional quota is allocated to participate in the team event.)	Yes	6
Portugal	1	1				2
Puerto Rico		1				1
ROC	1	3	3		Yes	7
Romania	1	1				2
San Marino	1	1				2
Saudi Arabia		1				1
Serbia	1	1				2
Slovakia	3	2			Yes	5
Slovenia	3	3	4	2	Yes	12
South Korea	1	1	1			3
Spain	1	2				3
Sweden	3	2	~~6~~ 3		Yes	8
Switzerland	3	3	8	8	Yes	22
Thailand	1	1				2
Turkey	1	1				2
Ukraine	1	1				2
United States	3	3	8	3	Yes	17
Uzbekistan	0	1				1
Total: 83 NOCs	89	110	64	47	16	310

- Both Kenya and Malta refused a female quota, their only allocations.

=== Team event ===
Rank	NOC	Points
1	Austria	6237
2	Switzerland	5671
3	Italy	3865
4	Norway	2907
5	United States	2343
6	France	2229
7	Germany	1577
8	Slovenia	1264
9	Canada	1159
10	Sweden	1120
11	Slovakia	951
12	~~Croatia~~	405
13	Czech Republic	220
14	Great Britain	164
15	Poland	163
16	New Zealand	128
17	ROC	84
18	Belgium	82
19	Bulgaria	73
20	Japan	52
21	Spain	32
22	Finland	28
23	Bosnia and Herzegovina	13
24	Belarus	11
25	Netherlands	6
26	China	0

- Croatia declined a spot in the team event, their allocation passed to the next eligible NOC which was ROC.

=== Next eligible NOC per event ===
A country can be eligible for more than one quota spot per event in the reallocation process. A strike through indicates the NOC refused, bolded NOCs accepted a reallocation. NOCs that had already refused a quota are omitted. Only the reallocation process and the next five eligible NOCs are shown.

Women's	Men's
**ROC**; ~~Slovenia~~; **France**; ~~Italy~~; ~~France~~; **Croatia**; **Japan**; **Canada**; ~~Netherlands~~; ~~Serbia~~; ~~Great Britain~~; **United States**; **United States**; **Canada**; **Finland**; ~~Croatia~~; **ROC**; **Australia**; **ROC**; **Canada**; ~~Canada~~; **Finland**; **Poland**; **Bosnia and Herzegovina**; ~~Finland~~; ~~Japan~~; ~~Romania~~; ~~Andorra~~; ~~ROC~~; **South Korea**; **Czech Republic**; **Czech Republic**; Czech Republic; Spain	**Canada**; **Germany**; **Norway**; **Austria**; **Germany**; **Austria**; **France**; Italy; Norway; France; United States; Canada
