= Han Yueshuang =

Hong Kong short track speed skater

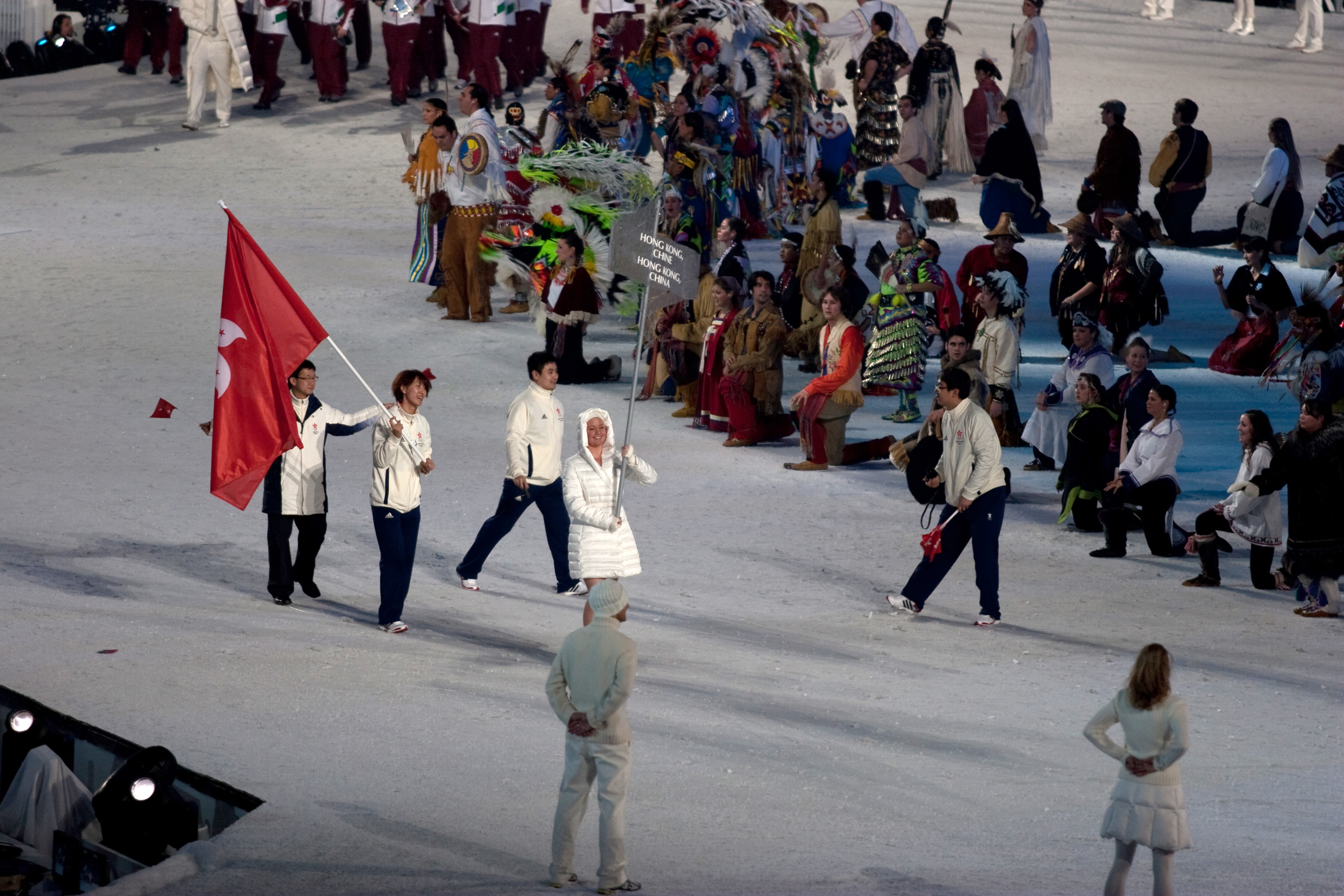
Han Yueshuang at the 2010 Winter Olympics opening ceremony.

Han Yueshuang (simplified Chinese: 韩月双; traditional Chinese: 韓月雙; pinyin: Hán Yuèshāng; Jyutping: hon^{4} jyut^{6} soeng^{1}; born 6 November 1982) is a short track speed skater from Hong Kong.

She was the only athlete to represent Hong Kong at the 2006 and 2010 Winter Olympics, competing in the 500m, 1000m and 1500m events. She was a fill in at the 2010 Winter Olympics after her teammate Wang Xinxue failed to meet the residency requirement and Wang qualified for an Olympic berth at the World Cup event in Marquette.

Originally from Jilin, she moved to Hong Kong in 2003. She needed a special exemption from the International Olympic Committee to solve her own passport situation in 2006. She eventually gained her Hong Kong passport in October 2009 and trained mostly in the mainland for lack of skating facilities in Hong Kong.

She caught a cold at the 2010 Winter Olympics opening ceremony due to a sponsorship contract, having had to wear a light jacket instead of a warm jacket provided by the Hong Kong Olympic Committee.

Han has retired after the 2010 Asian Short Track Speed Skating Championships in Japan in March 2010. Han currently coaches at various venues in the mainland and in Hong Kong.
