= Barton Lui Pan-To =

Hong Kong short track speed skater

Barton Lui
Personal information
- Native name: 呂品韜
- Born: Lui Pan-To Barton; April 8, 1993 (age 33) Hong Kong

Sport
- Sport: Short track speed skating

Barton Lui Pan-To (Chinese: 呂品韜; born April 8, 1993, in Hong Kong) is a short track speed skater who has competed since 2010. Barton Lui has also qualified to compete for Hong Kong at the 2014 Winter Olympics in Sochi, Russia. By doing so he became the first male athlete to qualify from Hong Kong in short track speed skating, and has also carried the flag during the opening ceremony.

== Life ==
Barton Lui first moved to Vancouver Canada when he was 2 years old and went back to Hong Kong for 6 years attending primary school over there. He picked up the sport while he was in primary school and in 2007 he moved back to Vancouver where he continues to skate in Burnaby and Coquitlam while attending high school. In 2010, he decided to put the school on a hiatus and began his professional short track speed skating career and trained in Jilin, China and Seoul, Korea. He then qualified for the Winter Olympics in 2014. He is fluent in Cantonese, English, and Mandarin Chinese.

== Career ==
Lui began short-track skating training at age 10 in Hong Kong. However, due to lack of venue for proper training, he moved to Vancouver in his teens for training. Later, he moved to train in Changchun, Jilin in China before moving to train at Korea National Sports University in Seoul, South Korea in 2012. He became a member of Hong Kong's official skating team in 2008. His international competition debut took place in 2010 World Championships in the 1000m event. His first medal was won at the 2012 Asian Junior Championships. At November's 2012 World Cup Championship in Turin and Kolomna, Russia, he qualified for the 1500m event for the short track speed skating at the 2014 Winter Olympics. He is currently the record holder in 500m, 1000m, and 1500m in short track speed skating for Hong Kong.

He is now a realtor working in Vancouver at Oakwyn Realty Downtown Ltd.

== Personal records ==
Distance	Nation	City	Date	Record Time
500 meters	Russia	Kolomna	November 14, 2013	41.771
1000 meters	China	Shanghai	September 27, 2013	1:28.268
1500 meters	Italy	Turin	November 9, 2013	2:15.111
