= 1998 European Short Track Speed Skating Championships =

- Venue: Budapest, Hungary
- Dates: 23–25 January

The 1998 European Short Track Speed Skating Championships took place between 23 and 25 January 1998 in Budapest, Hungary.

== Medal summary ==
=== Medal table ===
* Host nation (Hungary)

Rank	Nation	Gold	Silver	Bronze	Total
1	Italy (ITA)	9	6	3	18
2	Great Britain (GBR)	2	1	1	4
3	Netherlands (NED)	1	7	5	13
4	Germany (GER)	0	0	1	1
Totals (4 entries)		12	14	10	36

=== Men's events ===
Event	Gold		Silver		Bronze	
500 metres	Dave Versteeg (NED)	42.648	Fabio Carta (ITA)	42.651	Michele Antonioli (ITA)	42.831
1000 metres	Nicky Gooch (GBR)	1:32.480	Fabio Carta (ITA)	1:32.623	Michele Antonioli (ITA)	1:32.818
1500 metres	Fabio Carta (ITA)	2:26.390	Nicola Franceschina (ITA)	2:26.622	Dave Versteeg (NED)	2:27.094
3000 metres	Michele Antonioli (ITA)	5:29.078	Fabio Carta (ITA)	5:29.179	Nicky Gooch (GBR)	5:29.291
5000 metre relay	Great Britain; Robert Mitchell; Nicky Gooch; Matthew Jasper; Matthew Rowe; Dave Allardice	7:09.168	Italy; Maurizio Carnino; Fabio Carta; Nicola Franceschina; Michele Antonioli; Diego Cattani	7:11.402	Netherlands; Patrick Vergeer; Dave Versteeg; Alex Velzeboer; Joost Smit; Vincent Wolvers	7:18.727
Overall Classification	Fabio Carta (ITA)	14 pts.	Dave Versteeg (NED) Michele Antonioli (ITA)	9 pts.		

=== Women's events ===
Event	Gold		Silver		Bronze	
500 metres	Barbara Baldissera (ITA)	46.262	Anke Jannie Landman (NED)	46.334	Marinella Canclini (ITA)	46.337
1000 metres	Marinella Canclini (ITA)	1:33.542	Ellen Wiegers (NED)	1:33.803	Anke Jannie Landman (NED)	1:33.991
1500 metres	Marinella Canclini (ITA)	2:25.291	Ellen Wiegers (NED)	2:25.690	Anke Jannie Landman (NED)	2:26.580
3000 metres	Marinella Canclini (ITA)	5:44.256	Debbie Palmer (GBR)	5:45.895	Ellen Wiegers (NED)	5:55.697
3000 metre relay	Italy; Marinella Canclini; Mara Zini; Mara Urbani; Evelina Rodigari; Barbara Baldissera	4:25.090	Netherlands; Ellen Wiegers; Anke Jannie Landman; Maureen de Lange; Melanie de Lange	4:26.246	Germany; Yvonne Kunze; Katrin Weber; Susanne Busch; Anna Eckner	4:26.903
Overall Classification	Marinella Canclini (ITA)	17 pts.	Anke Jannie Landman (NED) Ellen Wiegers (NED)	8 pts.		

== Participating nations ==
- Austria
- Belgium
- Belarus
- Bulgaria
- Denmark
- France
- Germany
- Great Britain
- Hungary
- Israel
- Italy
- Lithuania
- Netherlands
- Norway
- Poland
- Romania
- Russia
- Sweden
- Switzerland
- Ukraine

== See also ==
- Short track speed skating
- European Short Track Speed Skating Championships
