= 1998–99 ISU Short Track Speed Skating World Cup =

The 1998–99 Short Track Speed Skating World Cup was a multi-race tournament in short track speed skating. The season began on 25 September 1998 and ended on 6 December 1998.

== Men ==
=== Events ===
Date	Place	Discipline	Winner	2nd place	3rd place
25-27 September 1998	(Canada) Montreal	500 m	(Italy) Fabio Carta	(China) Li Jiajun	(Belgium) Simon Van Vossel
25-27 September 1998	(Canada) Montreal	1000 m	(China) Li Jiajun	(Italy) Nicola Franceschina	
25-27 September 1998	(Canada) Montreal	1500 m	(Japan) Satoru Terao	(Italy) Fabio Carta	(United Kingdom) Nicky Gooch
25-27 September 1998	(Canada) Montreal	3000 m	(China) Li Jiajun	(Japan) Satoru Terao	(Italy) Fabio Carta
25-27 September 1998	(Canada) Montreal	5000 m relay	China	Italy	Japan
2-4 October 1998	(United States) Saratoga Springs	500 m	(Italy) Fabio Carta	(United States) Daniel Weinstein	(China) Li Jiajun
2-4 October 1998	(United States) Saratoga Springs	1000 m	(Italy) Fabio Carta	(Japan) Satoru Terao	(Netherlands) Dave Versteeg
2-4 October 1998	(United States) Saratoga Springs	1500 m	(China) Li Jiajun	(Italy) Michele Antonioli	(Italy) Nicola Franceschina
2-4 October 1998	(United States) Saratoga Springs	3000 m	(China) Li Jiajun	(Italy) Nicola Franceschina	(Italy) Fabio Carta
2-4 October 1998	(United States) Saratoga Springs	5000 m relay	Italy	Canada	Japan
30 October - 1 November 1998	(Netherlands) Zoetermeer	500 m	(South Korea) Kim Dong-Sung	(Italy) Fabio Carta	(Canada) Mathieu Turcotte
30 October - 1 November 1998	(Netherlands) Zoetermeer	1000 m	(Italy) Nicola Franceschina	(Italy) Fabio Carta	(South Korea) Kim Dong-Sung
30 October - 1 November 1998	(Netherlands) Zoetermeer	1500 m	(South Korea) Kim Dong-Sung	(Italy) Nicola Franceschina	(South Korea) Lee Seung-Jae
30 October - 1 November 1998	(Netherlands) Zoetermeer	3000 m	(South Korea) An Jung-Hyun	(Italy) Fabio Carta	(South Korea) Kim Dong-Sung
30 October - 1 November 1998	(Netherlands) Zoetermeer	5000 m relay	South Korea	Italy	
6-8 November 1998	(Hungary) Székesfehérvár	500 m	(Italy) Fabio Carta	(Canada) Marc Gagnon	(South Korea) Lee Seung-Jae
6-8 November 1998	(Hungary) Székesfehérvár	1000 m	(United States) Apolo Anton Ohno	(South Korea) Kim Dong-Sung	(South Korea) Lee Seung-Jae
6-8 November 1998	(Hungary) Székesfehérvár	1500 m	(South Korea) Kim Dong-Sung	(Italy) Fabio Carta	(United States) Apolo Anton Ohno
6-8 November 1998	(Hungary) Székesfehérvár	3000 m	(South Korea) Kim Dong-Sung	(Italy) Fabio Carta	(Italy) Michele Antonioli
6-8 November 1998	(Hungary) Székesfehérvár	5000 m relay	Italy	Canada	Hungary
27-28 November 1998	(Japan) Nobeyama	500 m	(China) Li Jiajun	(Japan) Takafumi Nishitani	(Japan) Satoru Terao
27-28 November 1998	(Japan) Nobeyama	1000 m	(South Korea) Kim Dong-Sung	(Japan) Satoru Terao	(Japan) Takafumi Nishitani
27-28 November 1998	(Japan) Nobeyama	1500 m	(South Korea) Kim Dong-Sung	(Belgium) Simon Van Vossel	(South Korea) Lee Jun-Hwan
27-28 November 1998	(Japan) Nobeyama	3000 m	(South Korea) Kim Dong-Sung	(China) Li Jiajun	(China) Feng Kai
27-28 November 1998	(Japan) Nobeyama	5000 m relay	China	Japan	Canada
4-6 December 1998	(China) Beijing	500 m	(China) Li Jiajun	(China) An Yulong	(Japan) Satoru Terao (Japan) Takafumi Nishitani
4-6 December 1998	(China) Beijing	1000 m	(China) Li Jiajun	(Japan) Satoru Terao	(South Korea) Kim Dong-Sung
4-6 December 1998	(China) Beijing	1500 m	(China) Li Jiajun	(Japan) Satoru Terao	(China) An Yulong
4-6 December 1998	(China) Beijing	3000 m	(South Korea) Lee Jun-Hwan	(Belgium) Simon Van Vossel	(Japan) Takafumi Nishitani
4-6 December 1998	(China) Beijing	5000 m relay	Japan	China	United States
22-24 January 1999 European Championships in Oberstdorf, Germany
19-21 March 1999 World Championships in Sofia, Bulgaria
5-7 April 1999 World Team Championships in St. Louis, United States

=== World Cup Rankings ===
Overall

Rank	Name	Points
1	(China) Li Jiajun	98
2	(Italy) Fabio Carta	97
3	(South Korea) Kim Dong-Sung	93
4	(Japan) Satoru Terao	92
5	(Italy) Nicola Franceschina	84
6	(Belgium) Simon Van Vossel	80
7	(China) Feng Kai	77
8	(United States) Apolo Anton Ohno	71
9	(United Kingdom) Nicky Gooch	71
10	(United States) Daniel Weinstein	68

500 m

Rank	Name	Points
1	(Italy) Fabio Carta	99
2	(China) Li Jiajun	97
3	(Japan) Takafumi Nishitani	86
4	(China) Feng Kai	84
5	(Japan) Satoru Terao	78
6	(South Korea) Kim Dong-Sung	75
7	(Belgium) Simon Van Vossel	74
8	(China) An Yulong	72
9	(United States) Daniel Weinstein	72
10	(Italy) Nicola Franceschina	68

1000 m

Rank	Name	Points
1	(South Korea) Kim Dong-Sung	95
2	(Italy) Fabio Carta	93
3	(Japan) Satoru Terao	89
4	(China) Li Jiajun	85
5	(Italy) Nicola Franceschina	85
6	(China) Feng Kai	79
7	(South Korea) Lee Seung-Jae	75
8	(Canada) Mathieu Turcotte	74
9	(United States) Apolo Anton Ohno	71
10	(Netherlands) Dave Versteeg	62

1500 m

Rank	Name	Points
1	(South Korea) Kim Dong-Sung	89
2	(Italy) Fabio Carta	89
3	(Japan) Satoru Terao	83
4	(Belgium) Simon Van Vossel	81
5	(Italy) Michele Antonioli	80
6	(United States) Apolo Anton Ohno	76
7	(Canada) Mathieu Turcotte	76
8	(China) Feng Kai	74
9	(Italy) Nicola Franceschina	73
10	(United Kingdom) Nicky Gooch	73

5000 m relay

Rank	Name	Points
1	Italy	98
2	China	96
3	Japan	95
4	Canada	93
5	United States	90
6	Hungary	84
7	(United Kingdom) Great Britain	83
8	South Korea	68
9	Germany	57
10	Netherlands	56

== Women ==
=== Events ===
Date	Place	Discipline	Winner	2nd place	3rd place
25-27 September 1998	(Canada) Montreal	500 m	(China) Yang Yang (A)	(China) Yang Yang (S)	(Canada) Annie Perreault
25-27 September 1998	(Canada) Montreal	1000 m	(China) Wang Chunlu	(Italy) Marinella Canclini	(China) Yang Yang (S)
25-27 September 1998	(Canada) Montreal	1500 m	(Bulgaria) Evgenia Radanova	(China) Yang Yang (A)	(China) Yang Yang (S)
25-27 September 1998	(Canada) Montreal	3000 m	(China) Yang Yang (A)	(Bulgaria) Evgenia Radanova	(China) Wang Chunlu
25-27 September 1998	(Canada) Montreal	3000 m relay	China	Italy	United States
2-4 October 1998	(United States) Saratoga Springs	500 m	(China) Wang Chunlu	(China) Yang Yang (S)	(China) Yang Yang (A)
2-4 October 1998	(United States) Saratoga Springs	1000 m	(China) Yang Yang (A)	(China) Wang Chunlu	(China) Yang Yang (S)
2-4 October 1998	(United States) Saratoga Springs	1500 m	(China) Yang Yang (A)	(Bulgaria) Evgenia Radanova	(Italy) Marinella Canclini
2-4 October 1998	(United States) Saratoga Springs	3000 m	(China) Yang Yang (A)	(Bulgaria) Evgenia Radanova	(China) Yang Yang (S)
2-4 October 1998	(United States) Saratoga Springs	3000 m relay	China	Italy	United States
30 October - 1 November 1998	(Netherlands) Zoetermeer	500 m	(Bulgaria) Evgenia Radanova	(United States) Amy Peterson	(South Korea) Joo Min-Jin
30 October - 1 November 1998	(Netherlands) Zoetermeer	1000 m	(Italy) Marinella Canclini	(Bulgaria) Evgenia Radanova	(South Korea) Choi Min-kyung
30 October - 1 November 1998	(Netherlands) Zoetermeer	1500 m	(South Korea) Park Hye-Won	(Bulgaria) Evgenia Radanova	(Italy) Marinella Canclini
30 October - 1 November 1998	(Netherlands) Zoetermeer	3000 m	(South Korea) Joo Min-Jin	(Bulgaria) Evgenia Radanova	(Netherlands) Danielle Molendijk
30 October - 1 November 1998	(Netherlands) Zoetermeer	3000 m relay	South Korea	United States	Netherlands
6-8 November 1998	(Hungary) Székesfehérvár	500 m	(Bulgaria) Evgenia Radanova	(South Korea) Choi Min-kyung	(United States) Amy Peterson
6-8 November 1998	(Hungary) Székesfehérvár	1000 m	(Bulgaria) Evgenia Radanova	(South Korea) Choi Min-kyung	(South Korea) Joo Min-Jin
6-8 November 1998	(Hungary) Székesfehérvár	1500 m	(Bulgaria) Evgenia Radanova	(United States) Amy Peterson	(Netherlands) Danielle Molendijk
6-8 November 1998	(Hungary) Székesfehérvár	3000 m	(South Korea) Choi Min-kyung	(South Korea) Joo Min-Jin	(United States) Amy Peterson
6-8 November 1998	(Hungary) Székesfehérvár	3000 m relay	South Korea	Bulgaria	Italy
27-28 November 1998	(Japan) Nobeyama	500 m	(China) Wang Chunlu	(China) Yang Yang (S)	(South Korea) Choi Min-kyung
27-28 November 1998	(Japan) Nobeyama	1000 m	(China) Yang Yang (A)	(China) Yang Yang (S)	(South Korea) Choi Min-kyung
27-28 November 1998	(Japan) Nobeyama	1500 m	(China) Yang Yang (A)	(China) Yang Yang (S)	(China) Wang Chunlu
27-28 November 1998	(Japan) Nobeyama	3000 m	(China) Yang Yang (A)	(South Korea) Choi Min-kyung	(South Korea) An Sang-Mi
27-28 November 1998	(Japan) Nobeyama	3000 m relay	China	Canada	United States
4-6 December 1998	(China) Beijing	500 m	(China) Yang Yang (A)	(China) Wang Chunlu	(South Korea) Choi Min-kyung
4-6 December 1998	(China) Beijing	1000 m	(China) Yang Yang (A)	(China) Yang Yang (S)	(China) Wang Chunlu
4-6 December 1998	(China) Beijing	1500 m	(China) Yang Yang (A)	(South Korea) Choi Min-kyung	(China) Yang Yang (S)
4-6 December 1998	(China) Beijing	3000 m	(China) Yang Yang (A)	(South Korea) Choi Min-kyung	(China) Yang Yang (S)
4-6 December 1998	(China) Beijing	3000 m relay	China	South Korea	Canada
22-24 January 1999 European Championships in Oberstdorf, Germany
19-21 March 1999 World Championships in Sofia, Bulgaria
5-7 April 1999 World Team Championships in St. Louis, United States

=== World Cup Rankings ===
Overall

Rank	Name	Points
1	(China) Yang Yang (A)	100
2	(Bulgaria) Evgenia Radanova	98
3	(China) Yang Yang (S)	93
4	(South Korea) Choi Min-kyung	92
5	(Italy) Marinella Canclini	87
6	(United States) Amy Peterson	85
7	(United States) Erin Porter	76
8	(Canada) Annie Perreault	74
9	(Japan) Ikue Teshigawara	74
10	(China) Wang Chunlu	67

500 m

Rank	Name	Points
1	(China) Wang Chunlu	96
2	(China) Yang Yang (A)	94
3	(South Korea) Choi Min-kyung	92
4	(Bulgaria) Evgenia Radanova	89
5	(China) Yang Yang (S)	87
6	(United States) Amy Peterson	86
7	(Canada) Christine Boudrias	78
8	(United States) Erin Porter	74
9	(Canada) Annie Perreault	71
10	(Italy) Marinella Canclini	68

1000 m

Rank	Name	Points
1	(China) Yang Yang (S)	94
2	(China) Yang Yang (A)	93
3	(Bulgaria) Evgenia Radanova	93
4	(South Korea) Choi Min-kyung	91
5	(Italy) Marinella Canclini	87
6	(China) Wang Chunlu	84
7	(United States) Amy Peterson	83
8	(Netherlands) Danielle Molendijk	77
9	(Japan) Sachi Ozawa	77
10	(Japan) Ikue Teshigawara	67

1500 m

Rank	Name	Points
1	(China) Yang Yang (A)	99
2	(Bulgaria) Evgenia Radanova	98
3	(South Korea) Choi Min-kyung	87
4	(United States) Amy Peterson	85
5	(Italy) Marinella Canclini	83
6	(United States) Erin Porter	83
7	(Japan) Ikue Teshigawara	76
8	(China) Yang Yang (S)	70
9	(Netherlands) Danielle Molendijk	64
10	(Canada) Tania Vicent	62

5000 m relay

Rank	Name	Points
1	China	100
2	South Korea	96
3	Italy	93
4	United States	93
5	Canada	91
6	Japan	84
7	Netherlands	83
8	Bulgaria	45
9	Chinese Taipei	20
10	Hungary	19

== Podium summary ==
Rank	Nation	Gold	Silver	Bronze	Total
1	China (CHN)	29	13	13	55
2	South Korea (KOR)	15	8	14	37
3	Italy (ITA)	8	15	7	30
4	Bulgaria (BUL)	5	7	0	12
5	Japan (JPN)	2	7	7	16
6	United States (USA)	1	4	7	12
7	Canada (CAN)	0	4	1	5
8	Belgium (BEL)	0	2	4	6
9	Netherlands (NED)	0	0	4	4
10	Great Britain (GBR)	0	0	1	1
10	Hungary (HUN)	0	0	1	1
Totals (11 entries)		60	60	59	179
