= Caroline Hallisey =

American short track speed skater

Personal information
- Full name: Caroline Hallisey-Kepka
- Born: September 24, 1980 (age 45) Natick, Massachusetts, U.S.
- Height: 5 ft 4 in (163 cm)
- Weight: 132 lb (60 kg)
- Spouse: J P Kepka

Sport
- Country: United States
- Sport: Short track speed skating

Caroline Hallisey-Kepka (born September 24, 1980) is an American speed skater and three-time Olympian. She competed for the United States at the 1998, 2002, and 2006 Winter Olympics in short track speed skating.

== Biography ==
Hallisey grew up in Natick, Massachusetts and began speed skating at a young age. Hallisey met bronze medallist J P Kepka at the United States Olympic Training Center in Colorado Springs; the two later married. She is the cousin of figure skater, Stephen Carriere. She is currently a member and coach at the Bay State Skate Club.

Following her retirement from speed skating in 2006, Hallisey attended the University of Colorado Boulder. She is currently a teacher at Glen Urquhart School in Beverly, Massachusetts.

== Career ==
=== 1998 Winter Olympics ===
At the 1998 Winter Olympics in Nagano, Hallisey competed in short track speed skating in the women's 3000 metre relay. She competed alongside teammates Amy Peterson, Erin Porter, and Cathy Turner. The team qualified for the small finals with a time of 4:33.352, and finished in fifth place with a time of 4:26.253.

=== 2002 Winter Olympics ===
Hallisey returned in Salt Lake City, where she participated in her first individual Olympics events. Hallisey competed in the women's 500-metres, where she qualified for the finals. She finished in fifth place with a time of 44.679, five hundredths of a second behind first place. She also competed in the women's 1000-metres, and made it to the quarterfinals, but falling short of qualifying for the finals.

In the women's 3000 metre relay, Hallisey competed with Julie Goskowicz, Amy Peterson, and Erin Porter. The team placed fourth in the semifinals with a time of 4:36.002, qualifying them for the small finals. Overall, the team ranked seventh at a time of 4:20.730.

=== 2006 Winter Olympics ===
Hallisey's final Olympics was in Turin. The United States' women's 3000 metre relay team consisted of Hallisey, Allison Baver, Maria Garcia, and Hyo-jung Kim. In the semi-finals, the team placed third, qualifying for the small finals with a time of 4:18.333. The team ranked fourth overall due to the disqualification of the Chinese team, with a time of 4:18.740.
