= Short-track speed skating at the 1994 Winter Olympics – Women's 3000 metre relay =

Women's 3000 metre relay at the XVII Olympic Winter Games
- Pictogram for short track
- Venue: Hamar Olympic Amphitheatre
- Dates: 22 February 1994
- Competitors: 33 from 8 nations
- Winning time: 4:26.64

Medalists
1st place, gold medalist(s)		South Korea; Chun Lee-kyung; Kim So-hee; Kim Yun-mi; Won Hye-kyung
2nd place, silver medalist(s)		Canada; Christine Boudrias; Isabelle Charest; Sylvie Daigle; Nathalie Lambert
3rd place, bronze medalist(s)		United States; Amy Peterson; Cathy Turner; Nikki Ziegelmeyer; Karen Cashman

The Women's 3000 metre relay in short track speed skating at the 1994 Winter Olympics took place on 24 February at the Hamar Olympic Amphitheatre.

== Results ==
=== Semifinals ===
The semifinals were held on 24 February. The top two teams in each semifinal qualified for the A final, while the third and fourth place teams advanced to the B Final.

Semifinal 1

Rank	Country	Athlete	Result	Notes
1	Canada	Christine Boudrias; Isabelle Charest; Sylvie Daigle; Nathalie Lambert	4:26.94	Q OR
2	South Korea	Chun Lee-kyung; Kim So-hee; Kim Yun-mi; Won Hye-kyung	4:27.15	Q
3	Russia	Yekaterina Mikhaylova; Marina Pylayeva; Yelena Tikhanina; Viktoriya Troitskaya-Taranina	4:33.47	
4	Italy	Barbara Baldissera; Marinella Canclini; Katia Mosconi; Mara Urbani	4:45.18	

Semifinal 2

Rank	Country	Athlete	Result	Notes
1	China	Su Xiaohua; Wang Xiulan; Yang Yang (S); Zhang Yanmei	4:32.14	Q
2	United States	Amy Peterson; Cathy Turner; Nikki Ziegelmeyer; Karen Cashman	4:35.52	Q
3	Netherlands	Penèlope di Lella; Priscilla Ernst; Anke Jannie Landman; Esmeralda Ossendrijver	4:45.56	
4	France	Valérie Barizza; Sandrine Daudet; Sandra Deleglise; Laure Drouet	4:55.24	

=== Finals ===
The four qualifying teams competed in Final A, while four others raced in Final B.

Final A

Rank	Country	Athlete	Result	Notes
1st place, gold medalist(s)	South Korea	Chun Lee-kyung; Kim So-hee; Kim Yun-mi; Won Hye-kyung	4:26.64	
2nd place, silver medalist(s)	Canada	Christine Boudrias; Isabelle Charest; Sylvie Daigle; Nathalie Lambert	4:32.04	
3rd place, bronze medalist(s)	United States	Amy Peterson; Cathy Turner; Nikki Ziegelmeyer; Karen Cashman	4:39.34	Shana Sundstrom was an alternate of the American team but didn't compete and didn't get a medal.
–	China	Su Xiaohua; Wang Xiulan; Yang Yang (S); Zhang Yanmei	DQ	

Final B

Rank	Country	Athlete	Result	Notes
4	Italy	Barbara Baldissera; Marinella Canclini; Katia Mosconi; Katia Colturi	4:34.46	
5	Russia	Yekaterina Mikhaylova; Marina Pylayeva; Yelena Tikhanina; Viktoriya Troitskaya-Taranina	4:34.60	
6	Netherlands	Penèlope di Lella; Priscilla Ernst; Anke Jannie Landman; Esmeralda Ossendrijver	4:45.40	
7	France	Valérie Barizza; Sandrine Daudet; Sandra Deleglise; Laure Drouet	4:59.94	
