= Short-track speed skating at the 1998 Winter Olympics – Women's 3000 metre relay =

Women's 3000 metre relay at the XVIII Olympic Winter Games
- Pictogram for short track
- Venue: White Ring
- Dates: 17 February 1998
- Competitors: 33 from 8 nations
- Winning time: 4:16.260

Medalists
1st place, gold medalist(s)		South Korea; Chun Lee-kyung; Won Hye-kyung; An Sang-mi; Kim Yun-mi
2nd place, silver medalist(s)		China; Yang Yang (A); Yang Yang (S); Wang Chunlu; Sun Dandan
3rd place, bronze medalist(s)		Canada; Christine Boudrias; Isabelle Charest; Annie Perreault; Tania Vicent

The women's 3000 metre relay in short track speed skating at the 1998 Winter Olympics took place on 17 February at the White Ring.

== Results ==
=== Semifinals ===
The semifinals were held on 17 February. The top two teams in each semifinal qualified for the A final, while the third and fourth place teams advanced to the B Final.

Semifinal 1

Rank	Country	Athlete	Result	Notes
1	Japan	Ikue Teshigawara; Chikage Tanaka; Nobuko Yamada; Sachi Ozawa	4:24.087	QA
2	Canada	Christine Boudrias; Isabelle Charest; Annie Perreault; Tania Vicent	4:24.152	QA
3	Netherlands	Anke Jannie Landman; Maureen de Lange; Melanie de Lange; Ellen Wiegers	4:28.018	QB
4	Germany	Susanne Busch; Anne Eckner; Yvonne Kunze; Katrin Weber	4:38.776	QB

Semifinal 2

Rank	Country	Athlete	Result	Notes
1	South Korea	Chun Lee-kyung; Won Hye-kyung; An Sang-mi; Kim Yun-mi	4:21.510	QA
2	China	Yang Yang (A); Yang Yang (S); Wang Chunlu; Sun Dandan	4:22.342	QA
3	North Korea	Jong Ok-myong; Ho Jong-hae; Hwang Ok-sil; Han Ryon-hui	4:25.126	QB
4	United States	Caroline Hallisey; Amy Peterson; Erin Porter; Cathy Turner	4:33.352	QB

=== Finals ===
The four qualifying teams competed in Final A, while four others raced in Final B.

Final A

Rank	Country	Athlete	Result	Notes
1st place, gold medalist(s)	South Korea	Chun Lee-kyung; Won Hye-kyung; An Sang-mi; Kim Yun-mi	4:16.260	
2nd place, silver medalist(s)	China	Yang Yang (A); Yang Yang (S); Wang Chunlu; Sun Dandan	4:16.383	
3rd place, bronze medalist(s)	Canada	Christine Boudrias; Isabelle Charest; Annie Perreault; Tania Vicent	4:21.205	
4	Japan	Ikue Teshigawara; Chikage Tanaka; Nobuko Yamada; Sachi Ozawa	4:30.612	

Final B

Rank	Country	Athlete	Result	Notes
5	United States	Amy Peterson; Erin Porter; Cathy Turner; Erin Gleason	4:26.253	
6	Netherlands	Anke Jannie Landman; Maureen de Lange; Melanie de Lange; Ellen Wiegers	4:26.592	
7	North Korea	Jong Ok-myong; Ho Jong-hae; Hwang Ok-sil; Han Ryon-hui	4:27.030	
8	Germany	Susanne Busch; Anne Eckner; Yvonne Kunze; Katrin Weber	4:37.110	
