= 1997 European Short Track Speed Skating Championships =

- Venue: Malmö, Sweden
- Dates: 17-19 January
- from 19 nations

The 1997 European Short Track Speed Skating Championships took place between 17 and 19 January 1997 in Malmö, Sweden. It was the inaugural tournament.

== Medal summary ==
=== Medal table ===
* Host nation (Sweden)

Rank	Nation	Gold	Silver	Bronze	Total
1	Italy (ITA)	10	2	3	15
2	Netherlands (NED)	1	3	1	5
3	Great Britain (GBR)	1	1	1	3
4	Russia (RUS)	0	2	3	5
5	Bulgaria (BUL)	0	2	1	3
6	France (FRA)	0	1	2	3
7	Sweden (SWE)*	0	1	1	2
Totals (7 entries)		12	12	12	36

=== Men's events ===
Event	Gold		Silver		Bronze	
500 metres	Mirko Vuillermin (ITA)	43.393	Fabio Carta (ITA)	43.594	Nicky Gooch (GBR)	43.629
1000 metres	Fabio Carta (ITA)	1:40.996	Nicky Gooch (GBR)	1:41.112	Mirko Vuillermin (ITA)	1:41.188
1500 metres	Mirko Vuillermin (ITA)	2:33.215	Martin Johansson (SWE)	2:33.311	Bruno Loscos (FRA)	2:33.440
3000 metres	Fabio Carta (ITA)	5:08.091	Bruno Loscos (FRA)	5:10.348	Martin Johansson (SWE)	5:10.458
5000 metre relay	Great Britain; Robert Mitchell; Nicky Gooch; Matthew Jasper; Matthew Rowe	7:15.850	Netherlands; Harold Janssen; Dave Versteeg; Marc Velzeboer; Joost Smit	7:16.019	Italy; Orazio Fagone; Fabio Carta; Hugo Herrnhof; Michele Antonioli	7:25.008
Overall Classification	Fabio Carta (ITA)	13 pts.	Mirko Vuillermin (ITA)	12 pts.	Bruno Loscos (FRA)	7 pts.

=== Women's events ===
Event	Gold		Silver		Bronze	
500 metres	Marinella Canclini (ITA)	46.187	Evgenia Radanova (BUL)	46.259	Elena Tikhanina (RUS)	46.339
1000 metres	Marinella Canclini (ITA)	1:38.535	Elena Tikhanina (RUS)	1:38.797	Ellen Wiegers (NED)	1:39.241
1500 metres	Ellen Wiegers (NED)	2:41.571	Elena Tikhanina (RUS)	2:41.819	Evgenia Radanova (BUL)	2:42.070
3000 metres	Marinella Canclini (ITA)	5:36.987	Ellen Wiegers (NED)	5:37.341	Katia Colturi (ITA)	5:37.555
3000 metre relay	Italy; Marinella Canclini; Mara Zini; Katia Colturi; Evelina Rodigari	4:31.565	Bulgaria; Daniela Vlaeva; Evgenia Radanova; Anna Krasteva; Kristina Vuteva	4:32.217	Russia; Elena Tikhanina; Marina Pylayeva; Anastasia Razina; Yekaterina Mikhaylova	4:34.649
Overall Classification	Marinella Canclini (ITA)	15 pts.	Ellen Wiegers (NED)	11 pts.	Elena Tikhanina (RUS)	9 pts.

== Participating nations ==
- Austria
- Belgium
- Belarus
- Bulgaria
- Denmark
- Estonia
- France
- Germany
- Great Britain
- Hungary
- Israel
- Italy
- Lithuania
- Netherlands
- Norway
- Poland
- Russia
- Sweden
- Ukraine

== See also ==
- Short track speed skating
- European Short Track Speed Skating Championships
