= Short-track speed skating at the 2006 Winter Olympics – Women's 3000 metre relay =

Women's 3000 metre relay at the XX Olympic Winter Games
- Pictogram for short track
- Venue: Torino Palavela
- Dates: 12–22 February 2006
- Competitors: 36 from 8 nations

Medalists
1st place, gold medalist(s)		South Korea; Byun Chun-sa; Choi Eun-kyung; Jeon Da-hye; Jin Sun-yu; Kang Yun-mi
2nd place, silver medalist(s)		Canada; Alanna Kraus; Anouk Leblanc-Boucher; Amanda Overland; Kalyna Roberge; Tania Vicent
3rd place, bronze medalist(s)		Italy; Marta Capurso; Arianna Fontana; Katia Zini; Mara Zini

The women's 3000 metre relay in short track speed skating at the 2006 Winter Olympics began with the semifinals, on 12 February, and concluded with the final on 22 February, at the Torino Palavela.

== Records ==
Prior to this competition, the existing world and Olympic records were as follows:

World record	South Korea	4:11.742	Calgary, Canada	19 October 2003
Olympic record	South Korea	4:12.793	Salt Lake City, United States	20 February 2002

No new world and Olympic records were set during this competition.

== Results ==
=== Semifinals ===
The two semifinals, taking place on 12 February, matched four teams, each with four skaters on the ice, with the top two in each advancing to the A final. The other teams advanced to the B Final.

Semifinal 1

Rank	Athletes	Result	Notes
1	China; Cheng Xiaolei; Fu Tianyu; Wang Meng; Yang Yang (A)	4:16.739	QA
2	Canada; Alanna Kraus; Amanda Overland; Kalyna Roberge; Tania Vicent	4:17.231	QA
3	United States; Allison Baver; Maria Garcia; Caroline Hallisey; Hyo-jung Kim	4:18.333	QB
4	Japan; Yuka Kamino; Mika Ozawa; Chikage Tanaka; Nobuka Yamada	4:21.413	QB

Semifinal 2

Rank	Athletes	Result	Notes
1	South Korea; Byun Chun-sa; Choi Eun-kyung; Jin Sun-yu; Kang Yun-mi	4:18.854	QA
2	Italy; Marta Capurso; Arianna Fontana; Katia Zini; Mara Zini	4:19.797	QA
3	France; Stéphanie Bouvier; Choi Min-kyung; Myrtille Gollin; Celine Lecompere	4:20.030	QB
4	Germany; Tina Grassow; Aika Klein; Yvonne Kunze; Christin Priebst	DQ	QB

=== Finals ===
Two of the teams participating in Final A changed their teams between the semifinal and final rounds; Canada replaced Amanda Overland with Anouk Leblanc-Boucher and South Korea replaced Kang Yun-mi with Jeon Da-hye. China crossed the line in third place, but was disqualified when Wang Meng was adjudged to have interfered with a Canadian skater. This moved Italy up to the bronze medal position.

Final A

Rank	Athletes	Result	Notes
1st place, gold medalist(s)	South Korea; Byun Chun-sa; Choi Eun-kyung; Jeon Da-hye; Jin Sun-yu	4:17.040	
2nd place, silver medalist(s)	Canada; Alanna Kraus; Anouk Leblanc-Boucher; Kalyna Roberge; Tania Vicent	4:17.336	
3rd place, bronze medalist(s)	Italy; Marta Capurso; Arianna Fontana; Katia Zini; Mara Zini	4:20.030	
–	China; Cheng Xiaolei; Fu Tianyu; Wang Meng; Yang Yang (A)	DQ	

Final B

Rank	Athletes	Result	Notes
4	United States; Allison Baver; Maria Garcia; Caroline Hallisey; Hyo-jung Kim	4:18.740	
5	France; Stéphanie Bouvier; Choi Min-kyung; Myrtille Gollin; Celine Lecompere	4:18.971	
6	Germany; Tina Grassow; Aika Klein; Yvonne Kunze; Christin Priebst	4:24.896	
7	Japan; Yuka Kamino; Mika Ozawa; Chikage Tanaka; Nobuka Yamada	4:35.096	
