= 1999 European Short Track Speed Skating Championships =

- Venue: Oberstdorf, Germany
- Dates: 22-24 January

The 1999 European Short Track Speed Skating Championships took place between 22 and 24 January 1999 in Oberstdorf, Germany.

== Medal summary ==
=== Medal table ===
* Host nation (Germany)

Rank	Nation	Gold	Silver	Bronze	Total
1	Italy (ITA)	10	4	4	18
2	Bulgaria (BUL)	2	4	0	6
3	Netherlands (NED)	0	1	4	5
4	Great Britain (GBR)	0	1	3	4
5	France (FRA)	0	1	1	2
6	Germany (GER)*	0	1	0	1
Totals (6 entries)		12	12	12	36

=== Men's events ===
Event	Gold		Silver		Bronze	
500 metres	Nicola Franceschina (ITA)	42.152	Arian Nachbar (GER)	42.399	Michele Antonioli (ITA)	42.489
1000 metres	Fabio Carta (ITA)	1:31.783	Bruno Loscos (FRA)	1:32.011	Nicky Gooch (GBR)	1:32.034
1500 metres	Fabio Carta (ITA)	2:24.676	Nicky Gooch (GBR)	2:25.186	Nicola Franceschina (ITA)	2:25.215
3000 metres	Fabio Carta (ITA)	5:18.155	Michele Antonioli (ITA)	5:18.498	Bruno Loscos (FRA)	5:18.518
5000 metre relay	Italy; Maurizio Carnino; Fabio Carta; Nicola Franceschina; Michele Antonioli; Nicola Rodigari	7:01.859	Netherlands; Cees Juffermans; Dave Versteeg; Alex Velzeboer; Vincent Wolvers	7:11.129	Great Britain; Robert Mitchell; Nicky Gooch; Matthew Jasper; James Ellis	7:16.582
Overall Classification	Fabio Carta (ITA)	102 pts.	Nicola Franceschina (ITA)	47 pts.	Michele Antonioli (ITA)	39 pts.

=== Women's events ===
Event	Gold		Silver		Bronze	
500 metres	Marinella Canclini (ITA)	44.620	Evgenia Radanova (BUL)	44.622	Katia Colturi (ITA)	44.761
1000 metres	Evgenia Radanova (BUL)	1:46.739	Marinella Canclini (ITA)	1:46.783	Maureen de Lange (NED)	1:47.163
1500 metres	Evgenia Radanova (BUL)	2:26.553	Marinella Canclini (ITA)	2:26.800	Debbie Palmer (GBR)	2:27.225
3000 metres	Marinella Canclini (ITA)	5:17.223	Evgenia Radanova (BUL)	5:17.349	Danielle Molendijk (NED)	5:17.383
3000 metre relay	Italy; Marta Capurso; Marinella Canclini; Barbara Baldissera; Katia Colturi	4:21.513	Bulgaria; Daniela Vlaeva; Evgenia Radanova; Anna Krasteva; Marina Georgieva	4:22.465	Netherlands; Melanie de Lange; Danielle Molendijk; Maureen de Lange; Anouk Wiegers	4:25.087
Overall Classification	Marinella Canclini (ITA)	110 pts.	Evgenia Radanova (BUL)	110 pts.	Maureen de Lange (NED)	26 pts.

== Participating nations ==
- Austria (2/4)
- Belgium (1/0)
- Belarus (1/1)
- Bulgaria (2/4)
- Czech Republic (1/0)
- Estonia (0/1)
- France (2/1)
- Germany (4/4)
- Great Britain (4/4)
- Hungary (4/2)
- Israel (1/0)
- Italy (5/4)
- Lithuania (4/0)
- Netherlands (4/4)
- Norway (2/0)
- Poland (2/0)
- Russia (2/4)
- Slovakia (1/0)
- Sweden (4/0)
- Switzerland (1/0)
- Ukraine (1/4)

== See also ==
- Short track speed skating
- European Short Track Speed Skating Championships
