= Short-track speed skating at the 1998 Winter Olympics – Men's 1000 metres =

Men's 1000 metres at the XVIII Olympic Winter Games
- Pictogram for short track
- Venue: White Ring
- Dates: 17 February 1998
- Competitors: 30 from 16 nations
- Winning time: 1:32.375

Medalists
1st place, gold medalist(s)		Kim Dong-sung	South Korea
2nd place, silver medalist(s)		Li Jiajun	China
3rd place, bronze medalist(s)		Éric Bédard	Canada

The men's 1000 metres in short track speed skating at the 1998 Winter Olympics took place on 17 February at the White Ring.

== Results ==
=== Heats ===
The first round was held on 17 February. There were eight heats, with the top two finishers moving on to the quarterfinals.

Heat 1

Rank	Athlete	Country	Time	Notes
1	Chae Ji-hoon	South Korea	1:35.240	Q
2	Satoru Terao	Japan	1:35.323	Q
3	Yevhen Yakovlev	Ukraine	1:36.005	
4	Ludovic Mathieu	France	1:36.076	

Heat 2

Rank	Athlete	Country	Time	Notes
1	Naoya Tamura	Japan	1:31.168	Q
2	Fabio Carta	Italy	1:31.315	Q
3	Arian Nachbar	Germany	1:32.493	
4	Maciej Pryczek	Poland	1:33.555	

Heat 3

Rank	Athlete	Country	Time	Notes
1	Martin Johansson	Sweden	1:31.515	Q
2	Andy Gabel	United States	1:31.672	Q
3	Feng Kai	China	1:31.724	
4	Yun Chol	North Korea	1:33.133	

Heat 4

Rank	Athlete	Country	Time	Notes
1	Lee Jun-hwan	South Korea	1:32.879	Q
2	Éric Bédard	Canada	1:32.975	Q
3	Steven Bradbury	Australia	1:33.108	

Heat 5

Rank	Athlete	Country	Time	Notes
1	François Drolet	Canada	1:32.949	Q
2	Kim Dong-sung	South Korea	1:33.039	Q
3	Nicky Gooch	Great Britain	1:33.638	

Heat 6

Rank	Athlete	Country	Time	Notes
1	Matt Jasper	Great Britain	1:32.709	Q
2	An Yulong	China	1:32.731	Q
3	Dave Versteeg	Netherlands	1:32.748	
4	Boldyn Sansarbileg	Mongolia	1:39.913	

Heat 7

Rank	Athlete	Country	Time	Notes
1	Hitoshi Uematsu	Japan	1:30.466	Q
2	Marc Gagnon	Canada	1:30.476	Q
3	Bruno Loscos	France	1:30.805	
4	Scott Koons	United States	1:31.110	

Heat 8

Rank	Athlete	Country	Time	Notes
1	Rusty Smith	United States	1:33.326	Q
2	Li Jiajun	China	1:34.023	Q
3	Han Sang-guk	North Korea	1:34.220	
–	Michele Antonioli	Italy	DSQ	

=== Quarterfinals ===
The quarterfinals were held on 17 February. The top two finishers in each of the four quarterfinals advanced to the semifinals. In quarterfinal 1, Canada's Marc Gagnon was disqualified, and South Korea's Lee Jun-hwan was advanced. In quarterfinal 4, Japan's Hiotshi Uematsu was disqualified, and USA's Andy Gabel was advanced.

Quarterfinal 1

Rank	Athlete	Country	Time	Notes
1	Satoru Terao	Japan	1:29.398	Q OR
2	Matt Jasper	Great Britain	1:31.798	Q
3	Lee Jun-hwan	South Korea	1:38.115	ADV
–	Marc Gagnon	Canada	DSQ	

Quarterfinal 2

Rank	Athlete	Country	Time	Notes
1	Fabio Carta	Italy	1:32.358	Q
2	Kim Dong-sung	South Korea	1:32.423	Q
3	François Drolet	Canada	1:32.513	
4	Martin Johansson	Sweden	1:33.047	

Quarterfinal 3

Rank	Athlete	Country	Time	Notes
1	Naoya Tamura	Japan	1:29.509	Q
2	Éric Bédard	Canada	1:29.622	Q
3	An Yulong	China	1:29.784	
4	Rusty Smith	United States	1:39.775	

Quarterfinal 4

Rank	Athlete	Country	Time	Notes
1	Li Jiajun	China	1:34.510	Q
2	Chae Ji-hoon	South Korea	1:34.902	Q
3	Andy Gabel	United States	1:35.641	ADV
–	Hitoshi Uematsu	Japan	DSQ	

=== Semifinals ===
The semifinals were held on 16 February. The top two finishers in each of the two semifinals qualified for the A final, while the third and fourth place skaters advanced to the B Final.

Semifinal 1

Rank	Athlete	Country	Time	Notes
1	Andy Gabel	United States	1:32.985	QA
2	Éric Bédard	Canada	1:36.233	QA
3	Fabio Carta	Italy	1:39.402	QB
4	Naoya Tamura	Japan	1:42.908	QB
–	Chae Ji-hoon	South Korea	DSQ	

Semifinal 2

Rank	Athlete	Country	Time	Notes
1	Kim Dong-sung	South Korea	1:32.036	QA
2	Li Jiajun	China	1:32.183	QA
3	Matt Jasper	Great Britain	1:32.549	QB
4	Lee Jun-hwan	South Korea	1:32.634	QB
5	Satoru Terao	Japan	1:32.636	

=== Finals ===
The four qualifying skaters competed in Final A, while four others raced for 5th place in Final B.

Final A

Rank	Athlete	Country	Time	Notes
1st place, gold medalist(s)	Kim Dong-sung	South Korea	1:32.375	
2nd place, silver medalist(s)	Li Jiajun	China	1:32.428	
3rd place, bronze medalist(s)	Éric Bédard	Canada	1:32.661	
4	Andy Gabel	United States	1:33.518	

Final B

Rank	Athlete	Country	Time	Notes
5	Naoya Tamura	Japan	1:32.927	
6	Fabio Carta	Italy	1:33.015	
7	Lee Jun-hwan	South Korea	1:33.131	
8	Matt Jasper	Great Britain	1:34.285	
