= Short-track speed skating at the 1998 Winter Olympics – Men's 5000 metre relay =

Men's 5000 metre relay at the XVIII Olympic Winter Games
- Pictogram for short track
- Venue: White Ring
- Dates: 19–21 February 1998
- Competitors: 34 from 8 nations
- Winning time: 6:51.579

Medalists
1st place, gold medalist(s)		Canada; Éric Bédard; Derrick Campbell; François Drolet; Marc Gagnon
2nd place, silver medalist(s)		South Korea; Chae Ji-hoon; Lee Jun-hwan; Lee Ho-eung; Kim Dong-sung
3rd place, bronze medalist(s)		China; Li Jiajun; Feng Kai; Yuan Ye; An Yulong

The men's 5000 metre relay in short track speed skating at the 1998 Winter Olympics took place on 19 and 21 February at the White Ring.

== Results ==
=== Semifinals ===
The semifinals were held on 19 February. The top two teams in each semifinal qualified for the A final, while the third and fourth place teams advanced to the B Final.

Semifinal 1

Rank	Country	Athlete	Result	Notes
1	Canada	Éric Bédard; Derrick Campbell; François Drolet; Marc Gagnon	7:05.766	QA OR
2	China	Li Jiajun; Feng Kai; Yuan Ye; An Yulong	7:05.797	QA
3	Great Britain	Nicky Gooch; Matt Jasper; Matthew Rowe; Robert Mitchell	7:11.955	QB
4	Japan	Satoru Terao; Naoya Tamura; Takehiro Kodera; Yugo Shinohara	7:17.223	QB

Semifinal 2

Rank	Country	Athlete	Result	Notes
1	South Korea	Chae Ji-hoon; Lee Jun-hwan; Lee Ho-eung; Kim Dong-sung	7:07.457	QA
2	Italy	Michele Antonioli; Maurizio Carnino; Fabio Carta; Nicola Franceschina	7:07.770	QA
3	Australia	Steven Bradbury; Richard Goerlitz; Kieran Hansen; Richard Nizielski	7:11.691	QB
4	United States	Andy Gabel; Tommy O'Hare; Rusty Smith; Eric Flaim	7:16.724	QB

=== Finals ===
The four qualifying teams competed in Final A, while four others raced in Final B.

Final A

Rank	Country	Athlete	Result	Notes
1st place, gold medalist(s)	Canada	Éric Bédard; Derrick Campbell; François Drolet; Marc Gagnon	7:06.075	
2nd place, silver medalist(s)	South Korea	Chae Ji-hoon; Lee Jun-hwan; Lee Ho-eung; Kim Dong-sung	7:06.776	
3rd place, bronze medalist(s)	China	Li Jiajun; Feng Kai; Yuan Ye; An Yulong	7:11.559	
4	Italy	Michele Antonioli; Maurizio Carnino; Fabio Carta; Diego Cattani	7:15.212	

Final B

Rank	Country	Athlete	Result	Notes
5	Japan	Satoru Terao; Naoya Tamura; Takehiro Kodera; Yugo Shinohara	7:01.660	OR
6	United States	Andy Gabel; Tommy O'Hare; Rusty Smith; Eric Flaim	7:02.014	
7	Great Britain	Dave Allardice; Nicky Gooch; Matt Jasper; Matthew Rowe	7:06.462	
8	Australia	Steven Bradbury; Richard Goerlitz; Kieran Hansen; Richard Nizielski	7:15.907	
