= Short-track speed skating at the 2006 Winter Olympics – Women's 500 metres =

Women's 500 metres at the XX Olympic Winter Games
- Venue: Torino Palavela
- Dates: 12–15 February 2006
- Competitors: 28 from 17 nations

Medalists
1st place, gold medalist(s)		Wang Meng	China
2nd place, silver medalist(s)		Evgenia Radanova	Bulgaria
3rd place, bronze medalist(s)		Anouk Leblanc-Boucher	Canada

The women's 500 metres in short track speed skating at the 2006 Winter Olympics began on 12 February, with the final on 15 February, at the Torino Palavela.

== Records ==
Prior to this competition, the existing world and Olympic records were as follows:

World record	Evgenia Radanova (BUL)	43.671	Calgary, Canada	19 October 2001
Olympic record	Yang Yang (A) (CHN)	44.118	Salt Lake City, United States	16 February 2002

No new world and Olympic records were set during this competition.

== Results ==
=== Heats ===
The first round was held on 12 February. There were eight heats of three or four skaters each, with the top two finishers moving on to the quarterfinals.

Heat 1

Heat	Rank	Athlete	Country	Result	Notes
1	1	Wang Meng	China	45.011	Q
1	2	Marta Capurso	Italy	45.217	Q
1	3	Joanna Williams	Great Britain	46.857	
2	1	Alanna Kraus	Canada	45.688	Q
2	2	Kang Yun-mi	South Korea	45.755	Q
2	3	Susanne Rudolph	Germany	46.503	
2	4	Katalin Kristo	Romania	46.531	
3	1	Evgenia Radanova	Bulgaria	45.703	Q
3	2	Kateřina Novotná	Czech Republic	46.279	Q
3	3	Chikage Tanaka	Japan	46.387	
4	1	Anouk Leblanc-Boucher	Canada	45.929	Q
4	2	Hyo-jung Kim	United States	46.077	Q
4	3	Aika Klein	Germany	57.732	
4	–	Stéphanie Bouvier	France	DQ	
5	1	Fu Tianyu	China	45.636	Q
5	2	Yuka Kamino	Japan	45.848	Q
5	3	Rozsa Darazs	Hungary	1:10.558	
6	1	Allison Baver	United States	45.998	Q
6	2	Erika Huszar	Hungary	46.113	Q
6	3	Yun Jong-suk	North Korea	46.177	
6	4	Han Yue Shueng	Hong Kong	47.087	
7	1	Kalyna Roberge	Canada	45.396	Q
7	2	Arianna Fontana	Italy	45.398	Q
7	3	Liesbeth Mau Asam	Netherlands	45.500	
8	1	Jin Sun-yu	South Korea	45.954	Q
8	2	Sarah Lindsay	Great Britain	46.290	Q
8	3	Julia Elsakova	Belarus	47.726	
8	–	Ri Hyang-mi	North Korea	DQ	

=== Quarterfinals ===
The top two finishers in each of the four quarterfinals advanced to the semifinals. In quarterfinal #2, Sarah Lindsay of Great Britain was advanced after she was impeded during the race.

Quarterfinal 1

Rank	Athlete	Result	Notes
1	Fu Tianyu (CHN)	44.760	Q
2	Anouk Leblanc-Boucher (CAN)	44.821	Q
3	Arianna Fontana (ITA)	44.948	
4	Erika Huszar (HUN)	45.382	

Quarterfinal 2

Rank	Athlete	Result	Notes
1	Wang Meng (CHN)	45.257	Q
2	Allison Baver (USA)	53.135	Q
3	Sarah Lindsay (GBR)	1:01.289	
–	Kang Yun-mi (KOR)	DQ	

Quarterfinal 3

Rank	Athlete	Result	Notes
1	Evgenia Radanova (BUL)	44.252	Q
2	Marta Capurso (ITA)	44.438	Q
3	Alanna Kraus (CAN)	45.172	
4	Hyo-jung Kim (USA)	45.339	

Quarterfinal 4

Rank	Athlete	Result	Notes
1	Kateřina Novotná (CZE)	45.596	Q
2	Kalyna Roberge (CAN)	45.710	Q
3	Jin Sun-yu (KOR)	46.428	
4	Yuka Kamino (JPN)	47.356	

=== Semifinals ===
The top two finishers in each of the two semifinals qualified for the A final, while the third and fourth place skaters advanced to the B Final. The fifth-place finisher in semifinal #1, Sarah Lindsay, did not advance.

Semifinal 1

Rank	Athlete	Result	Notes
1	Fu Tianyu (CHN)	45.130	QA
2	Anouk Leblanc-Boucher (CAN)	45.234	QA
3	Allison Baver (USA)	45.512	QB
4	Kateřina Novotná (CZE)	45.718	QB
5	Sarah Lindsay (GBR)	46.060	

Semifinal 2

Rank	Athlete	Result	Notes
1	Wang Meng (CHN)	44.650	QA
2	Evgenia Radanova (BUL)	44.711	QA
3	Kalyna Roberge (CAN)	44.960	QB
4	Marta Capurso (ITA)	45.204	QB

=== Finals ===
Fu Tianyu originally placed third in final A, but was disqualified, moving Anouk Leblanc-Boucher up to third, and the Final B winner, Kalyna Roberge, to fourth.

On 16 February, Canada filed a protest with the Court of Arbitration for Sport over the results of the Final A, but it was dismissed. Evgenia Radanova of Bulgaria, who won the silver, crossed the finish line with part of one of her skates in the air, which is against the rules. This protest would have moved the winner of the B Final, Kalyna Roberge, to the bronze medal place, a bronze medal winner Anouk Leblanc-Boucher up to silver. The CAS ultimately dismissed this appeal, and the results stood.

Final A

Rank	Athlete	Result	Notes
1st place, gold medalist(s)	Wang Meng (CHN)	44.345	
2nd place, silver medalist(s)	Evgenia Radanova (BUL)	44.374	
3rd place, bronze medalist(s)	Anouk Leblanc-Boucher (CAN)	44.759	
–	Fu Tianyu (CHN)	DQ	

Final B

Rank	Athlete	Result	Notes
4	Kalyna Roberge (CAN)	46.605	
5	Marta Capurso (ITA)	46.899	
6	Kateřina Novotná (CZE)	55.378	
7	Allison Baver (USA)	55.689	
