= 2004–05 ISU Short Track Speed Skating World Cup =

International speed skating competition

ISU Short Track World Cup
- Dates: 22 October 2004 – 12 February 2005

The 2004–05 ISU Short Track Speed Skating World Cup was a multi-race tournament over a season for short track speed skating. The season began on 22 October 2004 and ended on 12 February 2005. The World Cup was organised by the International Skating Union who also ran world cups and championships in speed skating and figure skating.

The World Cup consisted of six tournaments in this season.

== Calendar ==
=== Men ===
==== China ====
Date	Place	Distance	Winner	Second	Third
22 October 2004	(China) Harbin	1500m	(United States) Apolo Anton Ohno	(South Korea) Ahn Hyun-soo	(China) Li Jiajun
23 October 2004	(China) Harbin	500m	(United States) Apolo Anton Ohno	(South Korea) Lee Seung-jae	(United States) Rusty Smith
24 October 2004	(China) Harbin	1000m	(South Korea) Ahn Hyun-soo	(South Korea) Song Kyung-taek	(China) Li Jiajun
24 October 2004	(China) Harbin	3000m	(South Korea) Ahn Hyun-soo	(United States) Apolo Anton Ohno	(South Korea) Lee Seung-jae
24 October 2004	(China) Harbin	5000m relay	South Korea	Canada	China

==== Beijing, China ====
Date	Place	Distance	Winner	Second	Third
29 October 2004	(China) Beijing	1500m	(South Korea) Ahn Hyun-soo	(United States) Apolo Anton Ohno	(China) Li Jiajun
30 October 2004	(China) Beijing	500m	(South Korea) Ahn Hyun-soo	(United States) Apolo Anton Ohno	(Canada) Jean-François Monette
31 October 2004	(China) Beijing	1000m	(South Korea) Ahn Hyun-soo	(United States) Apolo Anton Ohno	(South Korea) Song Kyung-taek
31 October 2004	(China) Beijing	3000m	(South Korea) Ahn Hyun-soo	(South Korea) Song Kyung-taek	(United States) Apolo Anton Ohno
31 October 2004	(China) Beijing	5000m relay	South Korea	United States	Canada

==== United States ====
Date	Place	Distance	Winner	Second	Third
26 November 2004	(United States) Madison	1500m	(United States) Apolo Anton Ohno	(Canada) Mathieu Turcotte	(Canada) Charles Hamelin
27 November 2004	(United States) Madison	500m	(Canada) Mathieu Turcotte	(United States) Apolo Anton Ohno	(Japan) Takafumi Nishitani
28 November 2004	(United States) Madison	1000m	(United States) Apolo Anton Ohno	(Canada) Mathieu Turcotte	(Canada) Charles Hamelin
28 November 2004	(United States) Madison	3000m	(United States) Apolo Anton Ohno	(China) Li Jiajun	(Canada) Charles Hamelin
28 November 2004	(United States) Madison	5000m relay	Canada	China	Japan

==== Canada ====
Date	Place	Distance	Winner	Second	Third
3 December 2004	(Canada) Saguenay	1500m	(United States) Apolo Anton Ohno	(Canada) Mathieu Turcotte	(Canada) Steve Robillard
4 December 2004	(Canada) Saguenay	500m	(Canada) Mathieu Turcotte	(United States) Apolo Anton Ohno	(China) Li Jiajun
5 December 2004	(Canada) Saguenay	1000m	(Canada) Charles Hamelin	(United States) Apolo Anton Ohno	(China) Li Jiajun
5 December 2004	(Canada) Saguenay	3000m	(Canada) Mathieu Turcotte	(United States) Apolo Anton Ohno	(China) Li Jiajun
5 December 2004	(Canada) Saguenay	5000m relay	Canada	China	Japan

==== Hungary ====
Date	Place	Distance	Winner	Second	Third
4 February 2005	(Hungary) Budapest	1500m	(South Korea) Ahn Hyun-soo	(United States) Apolo Anton Ohno	(Canada) Charles Hamelin
5 February 2005	(Hungary) Budapest	500m	(Canada) Mathieu Turcotte	(Canada) François-Louis Tremblay	(South Korea) Lee Seung-jae
6 February 2005	(Hungary) Budapest	1000m	(Canada) Charles Hamelin	(South Korea) Song Suk-woo	(Canada) François-Louis Tremblay
6 February 2005	(Hungary) Budapest	3000m	(United States) Apolo Anton Ohno	(Canada) François-Louis Tremblay	(Canada) Mathieu Turcotte
6 February 2005	(Hungary) Budapest	5000m relay	Italy	Canada	

==== Slovakia ====
Date	Place	Distance	Winner	Second	Third
10 February 2005	(Slovakia) Spišská Nová Ves	1500m	(United States) Apolo Anton Ohno	(Canada) Steve Robillard	(Canada) François-Louis Tremblay
11 February 2005	(Slovakia) Spišská Nová Ves	500m	(Canada) Charles Hamelin	(Canada) Steve Robillard	(Japan) Satoru Terao
12 February 2005	(Slovakia) Spišská Nová Ves	1000m	(United States) Apolo Anton Ohno	(South Korea) Ahn Hyun-soo	(Canada) Steve Robillard
12 February 2005	(Slovakia) Spišská Nová Ves	3000m	(South Korea) Ahn Hyun-soo	(United States) Apolo Anton Ohno	(Canada) Steve Robillard
12 February 2005	(Slovakia) Spišská Nová Ves	5000m relay	United States	South Korea	Canada

=== Women ===
==== China ====
Date	Place	Distance	Winner	Second	Third
29 October 2004	(China) Beijing	1500m	(China) Wang Meng	(South Korea) Choi Eun-kyung	(South Korea) Kang Yun-mi
30 October 2004	(China) Beijing	500m	(China) Wang Meng	(China) Fu Tianyu	(Italy) Marta Capurso
31 October 2004	(China) Beijing	1000m	(South Korea) Choi Eun-kyung	(China) Wang Meng	(South Korea) Kang Yun-mi
31 October 2004	(China) Beijing	3000m	(South Korea) Jin Sun-yu	(United States) Allison Baver	(Italy) Marta Capurso
31 October 2004	(China) Beijing	3000m relay	South Korea	Canada	Japan

==== Beijing, China ====
Date	Place	Distance	Winner	Second	Third
29 October 2004	(China) Beijing	1500m	(South Korea) Kang Yun-mi	(South Korea) Jin Sun-yu	(China) Wang Meng
30 October 2004	(China) Beijing	500m	(China) Fu Tianyu	(China) Zhu Mi Lei	(Canada) Tania Vicent
31 October 2004	(China) Beijing	1000m	(South Korea) Choi Eun-kyung	(South Korea) Kang Yun-mi	(South Korea) Jin Sun-yu
31 October 2004	(China) Beijing	3000m	(South Korea) Choi Eun-kyung	(South Korea) Kang Yun-mi	(South Korea) Jin Sun-yu
31 October 2004	(China) Beijing	3000m relay	South Korea	Other finalists were disqualified	

==== United States ====
Date	Place	Distance	Winner	Second	Third
26 November 2004	(United States) Madison	1500m	(China) Yang Yang (A)	(United States) Allison Baver	(Japan) Yuka Kamino
27 November 2004	(United States) Madison	500m	(China) Yang Yang (A)	(China) Wang Meng	(Italy) Marta Capurso
28 November 2004	(United States) Madison	1000m	(United States) Hyo-jung Kim	(Canada) Amanda Overland	(Bulgaria) Evgenia Radanova
28 November 2004	(United States) Madison	3000m	(China) Wang Meng	(United States) Hyo-jung Kim	(United States) Allison Baver
28 November 2004	(United States) Madison	3000m relay	China	Germany	Japan

==== Canada ====
Date	Place	Distance	Winner	Second	Third
3 December 2004	(Canada) Saguenay	1500m	(China) Wang Wei	(United States) Allison Baver	(United States) Hyo-jung Kim
4 December 2004	(Canada) Saguenay	500m	(China) Wang Meng	(United States) Allison Baver	(Bulgaria) Evgenia Radanova
5 December 2004	(Canada) Saguenay	1000m	(China) Yang Yang (A)	(China) Wang Wei	(United States) Hyo-jung Kim
5 December 2004	(Canada) Saguenay	3000m	(Netherlands) Annita van Doorn	(China) Wang Meng	(China) Yang Yang (A)
5 December 2004	(Canada) Saguenay	3000m relay	China	Russia	Canada

==== Hungary ====
Date	Place	Distance	Winner	Second	Third
4 February 2005	(Hungary) Budapest	1500m	(South Korea) Jin Sun-yu	(South Korea) Kang Yun-mi	(South Korea) Choi Eun-kyung
5 February 2005	(Hungary) Budapest	500m	(China) Fu Tianyu	(China) Wang Meng	(Bulgaria) Evgenia Radanova
6 February 2005	(Hungary) Budapest	1000m	(South Korea) Choi Eun-kyung	(South Korea) Kang Yun-mi	(South Korea) Jin Sun-yu
6 February 2005	(Hungary) Budapest	3000m	(South Korea) Jin Sun-yu	(South Korea) Choi Eun-kyung	(South Korea) Kang Yun-mi
6 February 2005	(Hungary) Budapest	3000m relay	China	(South Korea) Korea	Canada

==== Slovakia ====
Date	Place	Distance	Winner	Second	Third
10 February 2005	(Slovakia) Spišská Nová Ves	1500m	(South Korea) Jin Sun-yu	(South Korea) Yeo Soo-yeon	(Canada) Amanda Overland
11 February 2005	(Slovakia) Spišská Nová Ves	500m	(China) Wang Meng	(Bulgaria) Evgenia Radanova	(Canada) Anouk Leblanc-Boucher
12 February 2005	(Slovakia) Spišská Nová Ves	1000m	(South Korea) Jin Sun-yu	(South Korea) Yeo Soo-yeon	(China) Yang Yang (A)
12 February 2005	(Slovakia) Spišská Nová Ves	3000m	(South Korea) Yeo Soo-yeon	(South Korea) Jin Sun-yu	(Bulgaria) Evgenia Radanova
12 February 2005	(Slovakia) Spišská Nová Ves	3000m relay	China	Canada	South Korea

== Overall standings ==
=== Men ===
Distance	Winner	Second	Third
500m	(Canada) Mathieu Turcotte	(United States) Apolo Anton Ohno	(Canada) Charles Hamelin
1000m	(United States) Apolo Anton Ohno	(South Korea) Ahn Hyun-soo	(Canada) Mathieu Turcotte
1500m	(United States) Apolo Anton Ohno	(South Korea) Ahn Hyun-soo	(Canada) Mathieu Turcotte
5000m relay	Canada	South Korea	United States
Overall	(United States) Apolo Anton Ohno	(Canada) Mathieu Turcotte	(South Korea) Ahn Hyun-soo

=== Women ===
Distance	Winner	Second	Third
500m	(China) Wang Meng	(China) Fu Tianyu	(China) Yang Yang (A)
1000m	(South Korea) Choi Eun-kyung	(China) Wang Meng	(South Korea) Jin Sun-yu
1500m	(South Korea) Jin Sun-yu	(China) Wang Meng	(China) Yang Yang (A)
3000m relay	China	South Korea	Canada
Overall	(China) Wang Meng	(South Korea) Jin Sun-yu	(China) Yang Yang (A)

== Podium summary ==
Rank	Nation	Gold	Silver	Bronze	Total
1	South Korea (KOR)	23	18	11	52
2	China (CHN)	15	10	10	35
3	United States (USA)	11	16	5	32
4	Canada (CAN)	9	12	18	39
5	Italy (ITA)	1	0	3	4
6	Netherlands (NED)	1	0	0	1
7	Bulgaria (BUL)	0	1	4	5
8	Germany (GER)	0	1	0	1
8	Russia (RUS)	0	1	0	1
10	Japan (JPN)	0	0	7	7
Totals (10 entries)		60	59	58	177

== See also ==
- 2005 World Short Track Speed Skating Championships
- 2005 World Short Track Speed Skating Team Championships
- 2005 European Short Track Speed Skating Championships
