= Short-track speed skating at the 2010 Winter Olympics – Women's 1500 metres =

Women's 1500 metres at the XXI Olympic Winter Games
- Pictogram for short track
- Venue: Pacific Coliseum
- Date: February 20, 2010
- Competitors: 36 from 18 nations
- Winning time: 2:16.993

Medalists
1st place, gold medalist(s)		Zhou Yang	China
2nd place, silver medalist(s)		Lee Eun-byul	South Korea
3rd place, bronze medalist(s)		Park Seung-hi	South Korea

The women's 1500 metres in short track speed skating at the 2010 Winter Olympics was held on 20 February at the Pacific Coliseum.

== Results ==
=== Heats ===
Rank	Heat	Name	Country	Time	Notes
1	1	Sun Linlin	China	2:24.031	Q
2	1	Tania Vicent	Canada	2:24.100	Q
3	1	Nina Yevteyeva	Russia	2:24.277	Q
4	1	Kimberly Derrick	United States	2:24.375	
5	1	Veronika Windisch	Austria	2:24.440	
6	1	Patrycja Maliszewska	Poland	2:25.586	
1	2	Park Seung-hi	South Korea	2:24.129	Q
2	2	Zhou Yang	China	2:24.246	Q
3	2	Kateřina Novotná	Czech Republic	2:24.504	Q
4	2	Stéphanie Bouvier	France	2:24.966	
5	2	Valeriya Potemkina	Russia	2:28.405	
6	2	Han Yueshuang	Hong Kong	2:35.742	
1	3	Wang Meng	China	2:29.199	Q
2	3	Katherine Reutter	United States	2:29.316	Q
3	3	Jessica Gregg	Canada	2:30.321	Q
4	3	Bernadett Heidum	Hungary	2:30.332	
5	3	Biba Sakurai	Japan	2:30.458	
6	3	Katia Zini	Italy	2:30.606	
1	4	Cho Ha-ri	South Korea	2:22.928	Q
2	4	Kalyna Roberge	Canada	2:23.619	Q
3	4	Evgenia Radanova	Bulgaria	2:23.698	Q
4	4	Elise Christie	Great Britain	2:23.898	
5	4	Cecilia Maffei	Italy	2:24.931	
6	4	Olga Belyakova	Russia	2:26.762	
1	5	Arianna Fontana	Italy	2:27.120	Q
2	5	Tatiana Borodulina	Australia	2:27.408	Q
3	5	Erika Huszar	Hungary	2:27.487	Q
4	5	Katalin Kristo	Romania	2:36.022	
–	5	Paula Bzura	Poland		DSQ
–	5	Mika Ozawa	Japan		DSQ
1	6	Lee Eun-byul	South Korea	2:27.286	Q
2	6	Hiroko Sadakane	Japan	2:28.046	Q
3	6	Marina Georgieva-Nikolova	Bulgaria	2:28.732	Q
4	6	Allison Baver	United States	2:44.915	ADV
–	6	Aika Klein	Germany		DSQ
–	6	Rozsa Darazs	Hungary		DSQ

=== Semifinals ===
Rank	Heat	Name	Country	Time	Notes
1	1	Lee Eun-byul	South Korea	2:24.318	QA
2	1	Tania Vicent	Canada	2:24.742	QA
3	1	Sun Linlin	China	2:24.777	QB
4	1	Hiroko Sadakane	Japan	2:24.901	QB
5	1	Allison Baver	United States	2:45.053	
6	1	Nina Yevteyeva	Russia	2:25.414	
7	1	Marina Georgieva-Nikolova	Bulgaria	2:25.604	
1	2	Erika Huszar	Hungary	2:24.192	QA
2	2	Evgenia Radanova	Bulgaria	2:24.376	QA
3	2	Cho Ha-ri	South Korea	2:35.492	ADV
4	2	Katherine Reutter	United States	2:37.060	ADV
5	2	Kalyna Roberge	Canada	2:47.998	
–	2	Wang Meng	China		DSQ
1	3	Park Seung-hi	South Korea	2:20.859	QA, OR
2	3	Zhou Yang	China	2:21.049	QA
3	3	Arianna Fontana	Italy	2:21.522	QB
4	3	Tatiana Borodulina	Australia	2:21.617	QB
5	3	Valérie Maltais	Canada	2:23.722	
–	3	Kateřina Novotná	Czech Republic		DSQ

=== Finals ===
==== Final B (Classification round) ====
Rank	Name	Country	Time	Notes
9	Arianna Fontana	Italy	2:42.801	
10	Sun Linlin	China	2:42.960	
11	Tatiana Borodulina	Australia	2:43.051	
12	Hiroko Sadakane	Japan	2:43.135	

==== Final A (Medal round) ====
Rank	Name	Country	Time	Notes
1st place, gold medalist(s)	Zhou Yang	China	2:16.993	OR
2nd place, silver medalist(s)	Lee Eun-byul	South Korea	2:17.849	
3rd place, bronze medalist(s)	Park Seung-hi	South Korea	2:17.927	
4	Katherine Reutter	United States	2:18.396	
5	Cho Ha-ri	South Korea	2:18.831	
6	Erika Huszár	Hungary	2:19.251	
7	Evgenia Radanova	Bulgaria	2:19.411	
8	Tania Vicent	Canada	2:23.035	
