= 1995 European Youth Olympic Winter Days =

1995 edition of the European Youth Olympic Winter Festival

- Host city: Andorra la Vella
- Country: Andorra
- Nations: 40
- Athletes: 740
- Sport: 4
- Events: 17
- Opening: 4 February 1995
- Closing: 10 February 1995

Summer

Winter

The 1995 Winter European Youth Olympic Winter Days was an international multi-sport event held between 4 and 10 February 1995, in Andorra la Vella, Andorra.

== Sports ==
1995 European Youth Olympic Winter Days Sports Programme
- Alpine skiing (6)
- Cross-country skiing (5)
- Figure skating (3)
- Short track speed skating (3)

== Medalists ==
=== Alpine skiing ===
Event	Gold	Silver	Bronze
Boys giant slalom	Patrick Thaler; Italy	Beni Hofer; Switzerland	Andrej Jerman; Slovenia
Girls giant slalom	Daniela Huber; Austria	Marion Berger; Italy	Chiara Gronda; Italy
Boys slalom	Stephane Deslandes; France	Mitja Valencic; Slovenia	Markus Larsson; Sweden
Girls slalom	Dalia Lorbek; Slovenia	Chiara Gronda; Italy	Stina Dahelgren; Sweden
Boys super-G	Beni Hofer; Switzerland	Simone Arfino; Italy	Sondre Elvestrad; Norway
Girls slalom	Severine Remondet; France	Chiara Gronda; Italy	Melanie Lenor; France

=== Cross-country skiing ===
Event	Gold	Silver	Bronze
Boys 10 km classic	Martin Koukal; Czech Republic	Kostantin Gostiaev; Russia	Serguei Chtechoutchkine; Russia
Girls 7,5 km classic	Zuzana Kocumova; Czech Republic	Jenny Wissting; Sweden	Marianna Longa; Italy
Boys 10 km free	Filippo Cagnati; Italy	Martin Koukal; Czech Republic	Alexei Louchtine; Russia
Girls 7,5 km free	Olga Moskalenko; Russia	Katrin Šmigun; Estonia	Eva Tofalvi; Romania
Mixed relay 5 km free	Team Sweden; Sweden	Team Italy; Italy	Team Czech Republic; Czech Republic

=== Figure skating ===
Event	Gold	Silver	Bronze
Boys	Szabolcs Vidrai; Hungary	Vitaly Danilchenko; Ukraine	David Jäschke; Germany
Girls	Nadezda Kanaeva; Russia	Vanessa Gusmeroli; France	Krisztina Czakó; Hungary
Ice dancing	Isabelle Delobel; Olivier Schoenfelder; France	Jolanta Bury; Łukasz Zalewski; Poland	Krisztina Szabó; Tamás Sári; Hungary

=== Short track speed skating ===
Event	Gold	Silver	Bronze
Boys 500 m	Fabio Carta; Italy	Artem Morozov; Russia	Claude Romain Farys; France
Girls 500 m	Ellen Wiegers; Netherlands	Szilvia Szabolcsi; Hungary	Melanie De Lange; Netherlands
Mixed 3000 m relay	Team Italy; Italy	Team Hungary; Hungary	Team Great Britain; Great Britain

== Medal table ==
Rank	Nation	Gold	Silver	Bronze	Total
1	Italy (ITA)	4	5	2	11
2	France (FRA)	3	1	2	6
3	Russia (RUS)	2	2	2	6
4	Czech Republic (CZE)	2	1	1	4
5	Hungary (HUN)	1	2	2	5
6	Sweden (SWE)	1	1	2	4
7	Slovenia (SLO)	1	1	1	3
8	Switzerland (SUI)	1	1	0	2
9	Netherlands (NED)	1	0	1	2
10	Austria (AUT)	1	0	0	1
11	Estonia (EST)	0	1	0	1
11	Poland (POL)	0	1	0	1
11	Ukraine (UKR)	0	1	0	1
14	Germany (GER)	0	0	1	1
14	Great Britain (GBR)	0	0	1	1
14	Norway (NOR)	0	0	1	1
14	Romania (ROM)	0	0	1	1
Totals (17 entries)		17	17	17	51
