= 1996 World Short Track Speed Skating Team Championships =

Short track team championship

- Venue: Olympic Center
- Location: Lake Placid, United States
- Start date: 31 March 1996

The 1996 World Short Track Speed Skating Team Championships was the 6th edition of the World Short Track Speed Skating Team Championships which took place on 31 March 1996 in Lake Placid, United States.

== Medal winners ==
Event	Gold	Silver	Bronze
Men	Canada; Frédéric Blackburn; Derrick Campbell; Marc Gagnon; Bryce Holbech; François Drolet	Korea; Lee Sang-jun; Kim Dong-sung; Chae Ji-hoon; Kim Sun-tae	Italy; Orazio Fagone; Nicola Franceschina; Mirko Vuillermin; Michele Antonioli; Fabio Carta
Women	Korea; Won Hye-kyung; Chun Lee-kyung; An Sang-mi; Kim Yun-mi; Kim Soo-hee	Italy; Mara Urbani; Marinella Canclini; Katia Colturi; Barbara Baldisser; Evelina Rodigari	United States; Julie Goskowicz; Erin Gleason; Amy Peterson; Erin Porter; Karen Cashman

== Results ==
=== Men ===
Rank	Nation	Total
1st place, gold medalist(s)	Canada	58
2nd place, silver medalist(s)	Korea	42
3rd place, bronze medalist(s)	Italy	39
4	United States	29
5	China	24
6	France	23
7	Hungary	17

=== Women ===
Rank	Nation	Total
1st place, gold medalist(s)	Korea	50
2nd place, silver medalist(s)	Italy	48
3rd place, bronze medalist(s)	United States	34
4	Canada	33
5	China	25
6	Japan	24
7	Netherlands	17
