= Baldissera =

Baldissera is an Italian surname. Notable people with the surname include:

- Antonio Baldissera (1838–1917), Italian general
- Barbara Baldissera (born 1978), Italian short track speed skater

== See also ==
- Castellini Baldissera Italian family
