= Matthew Rowe =

Matthew or Matt Rowe may refer to:

- Matthew Rowe (cyclist)
- Matthew Rowe (speed skater)
- Matthew Rowe (rower)
