= 1994 World Short Track Speed Skating Team Championships =

Short track team championship

- Location: Cambridge, Canada
- Start date: 20 March 1994
- Competitors: 63 from 8 nations

The 1994 World Short Track Speed Skating Team Championships was the 4th edition of the World Short Track Speed Skating Team Championships which took place on 20 March 1994 in Cambridge, Canada.

== Medal winners ==
Event	Gold	Silver	Bronze
Men	Korea; Lee Joon-ho; Chae Ji-hoon; Lee Song-uk; Kim Ki-hoon; Chun Jae-mok	Canada; Frédéric Blackburn; Marc Gagnon; Derrick Campbell; Stephen Gough; Denis Mouraux	Italy; Mirko Vuillermin; Orazio Fagone; Hugo Herrnhof; Maurizio Carnino; Diego Cattani
Women	Canada; Angela Cutrone; Isabelle Charest; Christine Boudrias; Sylvie Daigle; Nathalie Lambert	Korea; Chun Lee-kyung; Won Hye-kyung; Kim Ryang-hee; Kim Yun-mi; Kim Soo-hee	Italy; Marinella Canclini; Barbara Baldissera; Katia Mosconi; Katia Colturi; Mara Urbani

== Results ==
=== Men ===
Rank	Nation	Total
1st place, gold medalist(s)	Korea	59
2nd place, silver medalist(s)	Canada	54
3rd place, bronze medalist(s)	Italy	40
4	United States	31
5	Japan	22
6	Norway	17
7	United Kingdom	12

=== Women ===
Rank	Nation	Total
1st place, gold medalist(s)	Canada	61
2nd place, silver medalist(s)	Korea	46
3rd place, bronze medalist(s)	Italy	34
4	United States	32
5	Netherlands	24
6	Japan	14
