= Mika Ozawa =

Japanese short track speed skater

Personal information
- Born: August 9, 1985 (age 40) Shiojiri, Nagano, Japan
- Height: 5 ft 6 in (168 cm)
- Weight: 128 lb (58 kg)

Sport
- Country: Japan
- Sport: Short track speed skating

Achievements and titles
- World finals: 1
- Highest world ranking: 8 (1500m)
Medal record
Women's short track speed skating
Representing Japan
World Team Championships
Silver medal – second place	2005 Chuncheon	Team

Mika Ozawa (小澤 美夏, Ozawa Mika; born August 9, 1985 in Shiojiri, Nagano) is a Japanese short-track speed-skater.

Ozawa competed at the 2006 and 2010 Winter Olympics for Japan. In 2006, she finished second in the opening round of the 1000 metres, then second in her quarterfinal, advancing to the semifinals, where she placed fifth, to end up ninth overall. She was also a member of the Japanese 3000 metre relay team, which finished fourth in the semifinals and fourth in the B Final, ending up seventh overall.

In 2010, she was disqualified in her round one race of the 1500 metres, failing to advance. In the 1000 metres, she finished second in the opening round, then fourth in the quarterfinals, failing to advance. She again participated in the 3000 metre relay team, which finished third in the semifinals and fourth in the B Final, ending up seventh overall.

As of 2013, Ozawa's best performance at the World Championships is fourth, as a member of the Japanese relay team in 2005. Her best individual result is 11th, in the 2003 1500 metres. She also won a silver medal at the 2005 World Short Track Speed Skating Team Championships for Japan, and a bronze medal at the World Junior Championships.

As of 2013, Ozawa has six ISU Short Track Speed Skating World Cup podium finishes, all as part of the Japanese relay team. Her best finish is a pair of silver medals. She finished eighth in the World Cup rankings in the 1500 metres in two seasons.

== World Cup podiums ==
Date	Season	Location	Rank	Event
24 October 2004	2004–05	Harbin	3rd place, bronze medalist(s)	3000m Relay
31 October 2004	2004–05	Beijing	2nd place, silver medalist(s)	3000m Relay
28 November 2004	2004–05	Madison	3rd place, bronze medalist(s)	3000m Relay
29 October 2006	2006–07	Jeonju	3rd place, bronze medalist(s)	3000m Relay
28 October 2007	2007–08	Kobe	3rd place, bronze medalist(s)	3000m Relay
27 September 2009	2008–09	Seoul	2nd place, silver medalist(s)	3000m Relay
