= Anne Eckner =

German speed skater

Personal information
- Nationality: German
- Born: 26 December 1979 (age 45); Rostock, Germany

Sport
- Sport: Short track speed skating

Anne Eckner (born 26 December 1979) is a German short track speed skater. She competed in the women's 3000 metre relay event at the 1998 Winter Olympics.
