= Danielle Molendijk =

Dutch short track speed skater

Personal information
- Nationality: Dutch
- Born: 10 December 1980 (age 45)

Sport
- Country: Netherlands
- Sport: Short track speed skating

Achievements and titles
- Personal best(s): 500 meter — 46.334; 1000 meter — 1:36.243; 1500 meter — 2:24.423; 3000 meter — 5:17.383
Medal record
Women's short track speed skating
Representing Netherlands
European Championships
Silver medal – second place	2001 The Hague	3000m relay
Bronze medal – third place	1999 Oberstdorf	3000m relay
World Junior Championships
Silver medal – second place	1999 Montreal	1500m
European Youth Olympic Winter Festival
Bronze medal – third place	1997 Sundsvall	1000m

Danielle Molendijk (born 10 December 1980) is a former Dutch short track speed skater. She was twice European Championships medalists in relays: bronze in 1999 and silver in 2001. During the 1998-99 season, she twice achieved the third place — in 3000m race in Zoetermeer and then in 1500m race in Székesfehérvár — thus becoming the first Dutch female short track speed skater reaching podium at the World Cup. She also went to the 1998 Olympic Games in Nagano, Japan.
