= Evelina Rodigari =

Italian speed skater

Personal information
- Nationality: Italian
- Born: 14 September 1978 (age 47) Bormio, Italy

Sport
- Sport: Short track speed skating
Medal record
Women's short track speed skating
Representing Italy
World Team Championships
Silver medal – second place	1996 Lake Placid	Team
Bronze medal – third place	2003 Sofia	Team
Bronze medal – third place	2004 Saint Petersburg	Team
European Championships
Gold medal – first place	1997 Malmö	3000 m relay
Gold medal – first place	1998 Budapest	3000 m relay
Silver medal – second place	2000 Bormio	1000 m
Bronze medal – third place	2000 Bormio	1500 m
Bronze medal – third place	2000 Bormio	3000 m
Silver medal – second place	2000 Bormio	3000 m relay
Bronze medal – third place	2000 Bormio	Overall
Gold medal – first place	2002 Grenoble	3000 m relay
Gold medal – first place	2003 Saint Petersburg	3000 m relay
Silver medal – second place	2004 Zoetermeer	3000 m relay

Evelina Rodigari (born 14 September 1978) is an Italian former short track speed skater. She competed in the women's 3000 metre relay event at the 2002 Winter Olympics.
