= Short-track speed skating at the 2002 Winter Olympics – Women's 500 metres =

Women's 500 metres at the XIX Olympic Winter Games
- Pictogram for short track
- Venue: Salt Lake Ice Center
- Dates: 16 February 2002
- Competitors: 29 from 17 nations
- Winning time: 44.187

Medalists
| 1st place, gold medalist(s) | | Yang Yang (A) | China |
| 2nd place, silver medalist(s) | | Evgeniya Radanova | Bulgaria |
| 3rd place, bronze medalist(s) | | Wang Chunlu | China |

The women's 500 metres in short track speed skating at the 2002 Winter Olympics took place on 16 February at the Salt Lake Ice Center.

== Records ==
Prior to this competition, the existing world and Olympic records were as follows:

| World record | Evgeniya Radanova (BUL) | 43.671 | Calgary, Canada | 19 October 2001 |
| Olympic record | Isabelle Charest (CAN) | 44.991 | Nagano, Japan | 19 February 1998 |

The following new Olympic records were set during this competition.

| Date | Round | Team | Time | OR | WR |
|---|---|---|---|---|---|
| 16 February | Heat 3 | Wang Chunlu (CHN) | 44.723 | OR | |
| 16 February | Semifinal 1 | Yang Yang (A) (CHN) | 44.118 | OR | |

== Results ==
=== Heats ===
The first round was held on 16 February. There were eight heats, with the top two finishers moving on to the quarterfinals.

Heat 1

| Rank | Athlete | Country | Time | Notes |
|---|---|---|---|---|
| 1 | Yang Yang (A) | China | 45.042 | Q |
| 2 | Marina Georgieva-Nikolova | Bulgaria | 45.916 | Q |
| 3 | Katalin Kristo | Romania | 46.956 | |

Heat 2

| Rank | Athlete | Country | Time | Notes |
|---|---|---|---|---|
| 1 | Joo Min-jin | South Korea | 45.547 | Q |
| 2 | Yvonne Kunze | Germany | 45.717 | Q |
| 3 | Cordia Tsoi | Hong Kong | 52.496 | |

Heat 3

| Rank | Athlete | Country | Time | Notes |
|---|---|---|---|---|
| 1 | Wang Chunlu | China | 44.723 | Q OR |
| 2 | Isabelle Charest | Canada | 44.964 | Q |
| 3 | Nataliya Dmitriyeva | Russia | 46.574 | |
| 4 | Kateřina Novotná | Czech Republic | 47.122 | |

Heat 4

| Rank | Athlete | Country | Time | Notes |
|---|---|---|---|---|
| 1 | Marta Capurso | Italy | 46.313 | Q |
| 2 | Olga Danilov | Israel | 46.422 | Q |
| 3 | Jo Williams | Great Britain | 46.631 | |
| 4 | Marianna Nagy | Hungary | 46.980 | |

Heat 5

| Rank | Athlete | Country | Time | Notes |
|---|---|---|---|---|
| 1 | Alanna Kraus | Canada | 45.101 | Q |
| 2 | Evgeniya Radanova | Bulgaria | 45.195 | Q |
| 3 | Susanne Rudolph | Germany | 45.288 | |

Heat 6

| Rank | Athlete | Country | Time | Notes |
|---|---|---|---|---|
| 1 | Chikage Tanaka | Japan | 45.193 | Q |
| 2 | Amy Peterson | United States | 45.448 | Q |
| 3 | Nina Yevteyeva | Russia | 46.180 | |
| 4 | Szandra Lajtos | Hungary | 48.488 | |

Heat 7

| Rank | Athlete | Country | Time | Notes |
|---|---|---|---|---|
| 1 | Sarah Lindsay | Great Britain | 45.461 | Q |
| 2 | Mara Zini | Italy | 45.556 | Q |
| 3 | Yuliya Pavlovich-Yelsakova | Belarus | 47.273 | |
| 4 | Christy Ren | Hong Kong | 55.423 | |

Heat 8

| Rank | Athlete | Country | Time | Notes |
|---|---|---|---|---|
| 1 | Choi Eun-kyung | South Korea | 45.395 | Q |
| 2 | Caroline Hallisey | United States | 45.535 | Q |
| 3 | Stéphanie Bouvier | France | 45.723 | |
| 4 | Yuka Kamino | Japan | 45.933 | |

=== Quarterfinals ===
The top two finishers in each of the four quarterfinals advanced to the semifinals. Canada's Isabelle Charest was advanced to the semifinals, with Japan's Chikage Tanaka disqualified.

Quarterfinal 1

| Rank | Athlete | Country | Time | Notes |
|---|---|---|---|---|
| 1 | Wang Chunlu | China | 44.739 | Q |
| 2 | Caroline Hallisey | United States | 44.826 | Q |
| 3 | Marta Capurso | Italy | 45.137 | |
| 4 | Olga Danilov | Israel | 46.695 | |

Quarterfinal 2

| Rank | Athlete | Country | Time | Notes |
|---|---|---|---|---|
| 1 | Yang Yang (A) | China | 44.810 | Q |
| 2 | Joo Min-jin | South Korea | 44.992 | Q |
| 3 | Amy Peterson | United States | 46.120 | |
| 4 | Marina Georgieva-Nikolova | Bulgaria | 46.422 | |

Quarterfinal 3

| Rank | Athlete | Country | Time | Notes |
|---|---|---|---|---|
| 1 | Evgeniya Radanova | Bulgaria | 44.780 | Q |
| 2 | Alanna Kraus | Canada | 44.863 | Q |
| 3 | Sarah Lindsay | Great Britain | 44.912 | |
| 4 | Yvonne Kunze | Germany | 46.465 | |

Quarterfinal 4

| Rank | Athlete | Country | Time | Notes |
|---|---|---|---|---|
| 1 | Choi Eun-kyung | South Korea | 44.846 | Q |
| 2 | Mara Zini | Italy | 44.876 | Q |
| 3 | Isabelle Charest | Canada | 45.011 | ADV |
| – | Chikage Tanaka | Japan | DSQ | |

=== Semifinals ===
The top two finishers in each of the two semifinals qualified for the A final, while the third and fourth place skaters advanced to the B Final. In the first semifinal, a dead heat for second place, between Canada's Isabelle Charest and Caroline Hallisey of the United States, meant that both advanced to the final.

Semifinal 1

| Rank | Athlete | Country | Time | Notes |
|---|---|---|---|---|
| 1 | Yang Yang (A) | China | 44.118 | QA OR |
| 2 | Isabelle Charest | Canada | 44.307 | QA |
| 2 | Caroline Hallisey | United States | 44.307 | QA |
| 4 | Mara Zini | Italy | 44.531 | QB |
| 5 | Choi Eun-kyung | South Korea | 44.647 | QB |

Semifinal 2

| Rank | Athlete | Country | Time | Notes |
|---|---|---|---|---|
| 1 | Evgeniya Radanova | Bulgaria | 44.686 | QA |
| 2 | Wang Chunlu | China | 44.734 | QA |
| 3 | Alanna Kraus | Canada | 44.776 | QB |
| 4 | Joo Min-jin | South Korea | 68.184 | QB |

=== Finals ===
The five qualifying skaters competed in Final A, while four other raced for 6th place in Final B.

Final A

| Rank | Athlete | Country | Time | Notes |
|---|---|---|---|---|
| 1st place, gold medalist(s) | Yang Yang (A) | China | 44.187 | |
| 2nd place, silver medalist(s) | Evgeniya Radanova | Bulgaria | 44.252 | |
| 3rd place, bronze medalist(s) | Wang Chunlu | China | 44.272 | |
| 4 | Isabelle Charest | Canada | 44.662 | |
| 5 | Caroline Hallisey | United States | 44.679 | |

Final B

| Rank | Athlete | Country | Time | Notes |
|---|---|---|---|---|
| 6 | Alanna Kraus | Canada | 44.930 | |
| 7 | Choi Eun-kyung | South Korea | 45.383 | |
| 8 | Mara Zini | Italy | 45.494 | |
| 9 | Joo Min-jin | South Korea | 46.893 | |
