= North Korea at the 1998 Winter Olympics =

- IOC code: PRK
- NOC: Olympic Committee of the Democratic People's Republic of Korea

in Nagano
- Competitors: 8 (2 men, 6 women) in 2 sports
- Flag bearer: Yun Chol (short track speed skating)
- Medals: Gold 0 Silver 0 Bronze 0 Total 0

Winter Olympics appearances (overview)
- 1964; 1968; 1972; 1976–1980; 1984; 1988; 1992; 1994; 1998; 2002; 2006; 2010; 2014; 2018; 2022–2026

Other related appearances
- Korea (2018)

North Korea competed as the Democratic People's Republic of Korea at the 1998 Winter Olympics in Nagano, Japan.

== Competitors ==
The following is the list of number of competitors in the Games.

Sport	Men	Women	Total
Short track speed skating	2	4	6
Speed skating	0	2	2
Total	2	6	8

== Short track speed skating ==
Men

Athlete	Event	Round one		Quarter finals		Semi finals		Finals	
Athlete	Event	Time	Rank	Time	Rank	Time	Rank	Time	Final rank
Han Sang-Guk	500 m	44.206	4	did not advance					
Yun Chol	500 m	45.014	4	did not advance					
Yun Chol	1000 m	1:33.133	4	did not advance					
Han Sang-Guk	1000 m	1:34.220	3	did not advance					

Women

Athlete	Event	Round one		Quarter finals		Semi finals		Finals	
Athlete	Event	Time	Rank	Time	Rank	Time	Rank	Time	Final rank
Jong Ok-Myong	500 m	46.835	2 Q	DSQ	–	did not advance			
Han Ryon-Hui	500 m	DNF	–	did not advance					
Hwang Ok-Sil	500 m	46.987	3	did not advance					
Han Ryon-Hui	1000 m	1:34.493	2 Q	1:34.405	4	did not advance			
Jon Ok-Myong	1000 m	DSQ	–	did not advance					
Ho Jong-Hae	1000 m	1:44.256	2 Q	1:38.546	4	did not advance			
Jong Ok-Myong; Ho Jong-Hae; Hwang Ok-Sil; Han Ryon-Hui	3000 m relay					4:25.126	3 QB	4:27.030	7

== Speed skating ==
Women

Event	Athlete	Race 1		Race 2		Total	
Event	Athlete	Time	Rank	Time	Rank	Time	Rank
500 m	Kim Jong-Hui	42.17	35	41.57	36	83.74	35
1000 m	Kin Jong-Hui					1:23.88	37
1000 m	Kim Ok-hui					1:23.37	36
