= 1993 World Short Track Speed Skating Team Championships =

Short track team championship

- Location: Budapest, Hungary
- Start date: 20 March 1993
- Competitors: 69 from 9 nations

The 1993 World Short Track Speed Skating Team Championships was the 3rd edition of the World Short Track Speed Skating Team Championships which took place on 20 March 1993 in Budapest, Hungary.

== Medal winners ==
Event	Gold	Silver	Bronze
Men	Italy; Mirko Vuillermin; Orazio Fagone; Hugo Herrnhof; Roberto Peretti; Diego Cattani	Canada; Bryce Holbech; François Drolet; Patrice LaPointe; Simon Allard; Denis Mouraux	South Korea; Kim Sun-tae; Choi Kwang-bok; Lee Seung-chan; Park Sae-woo; Jeon Jae-mok
Women	Italy; Marinella Canclini; Maria Rosa; Katia Mosconi; Katia Colturi; Mara Urbani	South Korea; Kim Yun-mi; An Sang-mi; Kim Na-young; Shin So-ja; Hyun Hye-sook	Russia; Svetlana Golokhmatova; Tatiana Nesterova; Anastasia Razina; Yekaterina Mikhaylova; Yelena Tikhanina

== Results ==
=== Men ===
Rank	Nation	Total
1st place, gold medalist(s)	Italy	63
2nd place, silver medalist(s)	Canada	46
3rd place, bronze medalist(s)	South Korea	37
4	Japan	36
5	Netherlands	21
6	Hungary	17
7	United Kingdom	17

=== Women ===
Rank	Nation	Total
1st place, gold medalist(s)	Italy	63
2nd place, silver medalist(s)	South Korea	49
3rd place, bronze medalist(s)	Russia	35
4	Canada	33
5	United States	21
6	Netherlands	21
7	Hungary	14
