= Céline Lecompére =

French speed skater (born 1983)

Personal information
- Nationality: French
- Born: 8 June 1983 (age 41); Troyes, France

Sport
- Sport: Short track speed skating

Céline Lecompére (born 8 June 1983) is a French short track speed skater. She competed in the women's 3000 metre relay event at the 2006 Winter Olympics.
