= Tommy O'Hare =

American speed skater

Personal information
- Born: July 10, 1977 (age 49) St. Louis, Missouri, United States

Sport
- Sport: Short track speed skating

Tommy O'Hare (born July 10, 1977) is an American short track speed skater. He competed in the men's 5000 metre relay event at the 1998 Winter Olympics.

In January 2025, he was appointed sports and special events director for the city of San Jose, California. He previously was the general manager of ClipperVision, the direct-to-consumer streaming platform for the Los Angeles Clippers.
