= Su Xiaohua =

Chinese speed skater

Personal information
- Nationality: Chinese
- Born: 14 November 1977 (age 47)

Sport
- Sport: Short track speed skating

Su Xiaohua (born 14 November 1977) is a Chinese short track speed skater. She competed in the women's 3000 metre relay event at the 1994 Winter Olympics.
