= Scott Koons =

American speed skater

Personal information
- Nationality: American
- Born: April 11, 1976 (age 50) Cleveland, Ohio, United States

Sport
- Sport: Short track speed skating

Scott Koons (born April 11, 1976) is an American short track speed skater. He competed in the men's 1000 metres event at the 1998 Winter Olympics.

On September 12, 2004, Koons road his bicycle for 16 and one quarter miles, in 60 minutes, without touching the handlebars. The Guinness Book of World Records recognized this as the longest distance cycled in one hour without touching the handlebars, although this record has since been broken.
