= Sandra Deleglise =

French speed skater (born 1976)

Personal information
- Nationality: French
- Born: 9 February 1976 (age 49); Saint-Jean-de-Maurienne, France

Sport
- Sport: Short track speed skating

Sandra Deleglise (born 9 February 1976) is a French short track speed skater. She competed in the women's 3000 metre relay event at the 1994 Winter Olympics.
