= Tina Grassow =

German speed skater

Personal information
- Nationality: German
- Born: 1 May 1988 (age 36); Sebnitz, Germany

Sport
- Sport: Short track speed skating

Tina Grassow (born 1 May 1988) is a German former short track speed skater. She competed in the women's 3000 metre relay event at the 2006 Winter Olympics.
