= Esmeralda Ossendrijver =

Dutch speed skater

Personal information
- Nationality: Dutch
- Born: 2 October 1968 (age 56); The Hague, Netherlands

Sport
- Sport: Short track speed skating

Esmeralda Ossendrijver (born 2 October 1968) is a Dutch short track speed skater. She competed in the women's 3000 metre relay event at the 1994 Winter Olympics.
