= Robert Mitchell (speed skater) =

British speed skater (1972–2022)

Personal information
- Full name: Robert Wright Mitchell
- Nationality: British
- Born: 9 June 1972 Portsmouth, England
- Died: 27 August 2022 (aged 50) Lincolnshire, England

Sport
- Sport: Short track speed skating

Achievements and titles
- Olympic finals: 1998 Winter Olympics
Medal record
Men's short track speed skating
Representing Great Britain
European Championships
Gold medal – first place	1997 Malmö	5000 m relay
Gold medal – first place	1998 Budapest	5000 m relay
Bronze medal – third place	1999 Oberstdorf	5000 m relay
Silver medal – second place	2000 Bormio	5000 m relay

Robert Wright "Rob" Mitchell (9 June 1972 – 27 August 2022) was a British short track speed skater. He competed in the men's 5000 metre relay event at the 1998 Winter Olympics.

Mitchell had a distinguished career as a speed skater, achieving success at the junior, senior, and masters levels. He first took an interest in the sport at the age of seven after watching leading racers taking part in an event in Scotland and subsequently joined the Peterborough Ice Racing Club at the age of 13. In 1986 he won the East of England Junior Championship and retained the title the following year. In 1988, at the age of 15, he won an international event at Den Haag in the Netherlands. Mitchell’s brother Graeme was also a competitive speed skater and member of the Peterborough club. The siblings competed against each other at the 1986 British Championships.

While studying as a medical student at the University of Birmingham, Mitchell joined the Mohawks Ice Racing Club in Solihull and became part of the Great Britain squad in 1993. Two years later he was part of the successful 5,000 metres relay squad that won three European titles and set a 5,000 metre world record of 7:09.54 in 1996. Accompanying Mitchell that day were Nicky Gooch, Matt Jasper, and Wilf O’Reilly. Between 1996 and 1998, Mitchell took a two-year sabbatical from university to concentrate on speed skating with the hope of joining the Team GB Olympic squad. Ultimately his dedication paid off and he represented Great Britain at the 1998 Winter Olympics in Nagano, Japan, finishing 7th with the GB relay squad. The following September, Mitchell returned to university to complete the final three years of his studying and eventually qualified as a doctor.

Mitchell continued speed skating and enjoyed success in Masters events. In 2017 he won the World Masters outdoor long track title, the British Masters, and also the 500m and 5000m titles at the Dutch Masters. He subsequently retained his British title in 2018. Mitchell’s last competition was at Heerenveen, Netherlands in March 2020 at age of 48.
