= Hiroko Sadakane =

Japanese short-track speed-skater

Personal information
- Born: May 16, 1986 (age 40) Aichi, Japan
- Height: 5 ft 3 in (160 cm)
- Weight: 119 lb (54 kg)

Sport
- Country: Japan
- Sport: Short track speed skating

Achievements and titles
- Highest world ranking: 16 (1500m)

Hiroko Sadakane (貞包 紘子, Sadakane Hiroko; born May 16, 1986 in Aichi) is a Japanese short-track speed-skater.

Sadakane competed at the 2010 Winter Olympics for Japan. She finished second in her opening round race of the 1500 metres, moving on to the semifinal. In the semifinal, she finished fourth, qualifying for the B Final, where she finished fourth again to end up twelfth overall. She was also a member of the 3000 metre relay team. She did not race in the semifinal, in which the team finished third, but did race in the B Final, with the team finishing fourth and ending up seventh overall.

As of 2013, Sadakane's best finish at the World Championships, is sixth, as a member of the Japanese relay team in 2010.

As of 2013, Sadakane has one ISU Short Track Speed Skating World Cup podium finish, a silver medal with the Japanese relay team, in 2009–10 at Seoul. Her best World Cup ranking is 16th, in the 1500 metres in 2009–10.

== World Cup podiums ==
Date	Season	Location	Rank	Event
27 September 2009	2008–09	Seoul	2nd place, silver medalist(s)	3000m Relay
