= An Jung-hyun =

South Korean speed skater (born 1983)

Personal information
- Born: November 30, 1983 (age 42) South Korea

Sport
- Sport: Short track speed skating
Medal record
Men's short track speed skating
Representing South Korea
World Championships
| Gold medal – first place | 2002 Montréal | 5000 m relay |
World Team Championships
| Bronze medal – third place | 2001 Minamimaki | Team |
| Bronze medal – third place | 2002 Milwaukee | Team |
World Junior Championships
| Silver medal – second place | 1999 Montreal | Overall |
| Silver medal – second place | 1999 Montreal | 1500m |
| Bronze medal – third place | 2001 Warsaw | 2000 m relay |

An Jung-hyun (Korean: 안중현; born 30 November 1983) is a South Korean former short track speed skater. He won a gold medal in 5000 m relay race at the 2002 World Championships.

He had also several successes at the World Cup. His first podium came during the 1998–99 World Cup when he won 3000 m race in Zoetermeer.

- 1998/1999 ISU World Cup Zoetermeer 3000M 1
- 2000/2001 ISU World Cup Trnava 3000m 1
- 2000/2001 ISU World Cup Nobeyama 5000m Relay 1
- 2000/2001 ISU World Cup Trnava Overall 3
