= Matthew Rowe (speed skater) =

British speed skater

Personal information
- Full name: Matthew Erick Rowe
- Nationality: British
- Born: 19 May 1977 (age 49) Isleworth, England

Sport
- Sport: Short track speed skating
Medal record
Men's short track speed skating
Representing Great Britain
European Championships
Gold medal – first place	1997 Malmö	5000 m relay
Gold medal – first place	1998 Budapest	5000 m relay

Matthew Erick Rowe (born 19 May 1977) is a British short track speed skater. He competed in the men's 5000 metre relay event at the 1998 Winter Olympics.
