= Yugo Shinohara =

Japanese speed skater (born 1978)

Personal information
- Born: 2 November 1978 (age 47) Japanese
Medal record
Men's short track speed skating
Representing Japan
World Championships
Silver medal – second place	1997 Nagano	5000 m relay
World Team Championships
Silver medal – second place	2000 The Hague	Team

Yugo Shinohara (篠原 祐剛, Shinohara Yūgō; born 2 November 1978) is a Japanese short track speed skater. He competed at the 1998 Winter Olympics and the 2002 Winter Olympics.
