= François Drolet =

Short-track speed skater

Medal record

Men's short track speed skating

Representing Canada

Olympic Games
Gold medal – first place	1998 Nagano	5000 m relay

World Championships
Gold medal – first place	1998 Vienna	5000 m relay
Silver medal – second place	1996 Hague	5000 m relay
Silver medal – second place	1997 Nagano	5000 m relay

World Team Championships
Gold medal – first place	1998 Bormio	Team
Gold medal – first place	1996 Lake Placid	Team
Silver medal – second place	1993 Budapest	Team

François Louis Drolet (born July 16, 1972) is a Canadian short track speed skater who competed in the 1998 Winter Olympics.

He was born in Sainte-Foy, Quebec City.

In 1998 he was a member of the Canadian relay team which won the gold medal in the 5000 metre relay competition. In the 1000 m event he finished eleventh and in the 500 m contest he finished 16th.
