= Yekaterina Mikhaylova =

Russian speed skater

Personal information
- Nationality: Russian
- Born: 28 August 1973 (age 52)

Sport
- Sport: Short track speed skating
Medal record
Women's short track speed skating
Representing Russia
World Team Championships
Bronze medal – third place	1993 Budapest	Team

Yekaterina Mikhaylova (born 28 August 1973) is a Russian short track speed skater. She competed in the women's 3000 metre relay event at the 1994 Winter Olympics.
