= Simon Van Vossel =

Belgian speed skater

Personal information
- Nationality: Belgian
- Born: 28 February 1979 (age 47) Ghent, Belgium

Sport
- Sport: Short track speed skating
Medal record
Men's short track speed skating
Representing Belgium
European Championships
Silver medal – second place	2002 Grenoble	5000 m relay

Simon Van Vossel (born 28 February 1979) is a Belgian short track speed skater. He competed in three events at the 2002 Winter Olympics.
