= Maria Garcia (speed skater) =

American speed skater

Personal information
- Nationality: American
- Born: September 20, 1985 (age 39); Los Angeles, California, United States

Sport
- Sport: Short track speed skating

Maria Garcia (born September 20, 1985) is an American short track speed skater. She competed in the women's 3000 metre relay event at the 2006 Winter Olympics.
