= Glen Urquhart School =

Coordinates: 42.5692°N 70.8161°W

- Beverly Farms, Massachusetts; United States

Information
- Motto: Mean well. Speak well. Do better.
- Founded: 1977
- Head of school: Gretchen Forsyth
- Grades: Pre-K-8
- Enrollment: 209
- Campus size: 23 acres
- Team name: Boars
- Website: https://www.gus.org
- (Final line of motto changed from "well" to "better" in recent years)

Glen Urquhart School is an independent, coeducational day school for students in grades pre-K through grade eight, located in Beverly Farms, Massachusetts.

== History ==
Glen Urquhart School (GUS) was established in a local church in 1977 as North Shore Middle School, and later took residence on the former 23-acre Orchidvale Estate in Beverly Farms in 1982.

When the school moved to the former Orchidvale property, it adopted its present name, Glen Urquhart School. The name combines the surname of Urquhart from the Urquhart Clan in Scotland, ancestors of the founders David and Lynne Warren, and "glen," the word for a green, shady place (replacing the word "vale" in the property's former name), creating the name Glen Urquhart.

The school's motto, "Mean Well. Speak Well. Do Well." is adapted from the Urquhart Clan. "Trust and go forward" is the school's slogan and a Clan Urquhart battle cry. Both phrases appear in the GUS school song, written by Georgia Bills.

Today, Glen Urquhart School has approximately 200 students from 30 towns and cities on the North Shore of Boston.

== Academics ==
GUS offers an academic program beginning with pre-k through 8th grade. The school enrolls approximately 200 students across lower school (K–5) classrooms and upper school (6–8) grades. An experiential and theme-based curriculum unfolds year by year, with kindergarten students studying "The World Around Us," then progressing through "Who Am I?' (First Grade), "Where Do I Live?" (Second Grade), "Where Am I Going?" (Third Grade), "The Sea" (Fourth Grade), "The Land" (Fifth Grade), "The People" (Sixth Grade) and returning to "Who Am I?" (Seventh Grade) and "Where Do I Live? Where am I going?" (Eighth Grade). These themes are based on child development theory such as the work of Jean Piaget and John Dewey and are enhanced by Harvard's Project Zero, which all GUS teachers participate in as part of their professional development.

All students take a course of study including math, English/language arts, science, social studies, Spanish. Most students also take Latin in grades six through eight. Spanish culture and language instruction is offered in all grades, beginning in kindergarten. Service learning projects beginning in kindergarten and culminating in an eighth grade work week teach students about their community and global responsibilities. The school's partners include The Food Project and Beverly Bootstraps. An outdoor classroom, nature trail, and 7,000 square foot greenhouse provide settings for hands-on environmental and science study.
