= Katrin Weber =

German speed skater

Personal information
- Nationality: German
- Born: 27 September 1976 (age 48); Rostock, East Germany

Sport
- Sport: Short track speed skating

Katrin Weber (born 27 September 1976) is a German short track speed skater. She competed in the women's 3000 metre relay event at the 1998 Winter Olympics.
