= Kim Jong-hui =

North Korean speed skater (born 1980)

Personal information
- Nationality: North Korean
- Born: 6 June 1980 (age 45)

Sport
- Sport: Speed skating

Kim Jong-hui (born 6 June 1980) is a North Korean speed skater. She competed in two events at the 1998 Winter Olympics.
