= Dave Allardice =

British speed skater (born 1975)

Personal information
- Born: 11 February 1975 (age 50) Paisley, Scotland

Sport
- Sport: Short track speed skating

Dave Allardice (born 11 February 1975) is a British short track speed skater. He competed at the 1998 Winter Olympics and the 2002 Winter Olympics.
