= Kalyna Roberge =

Short track speed skater

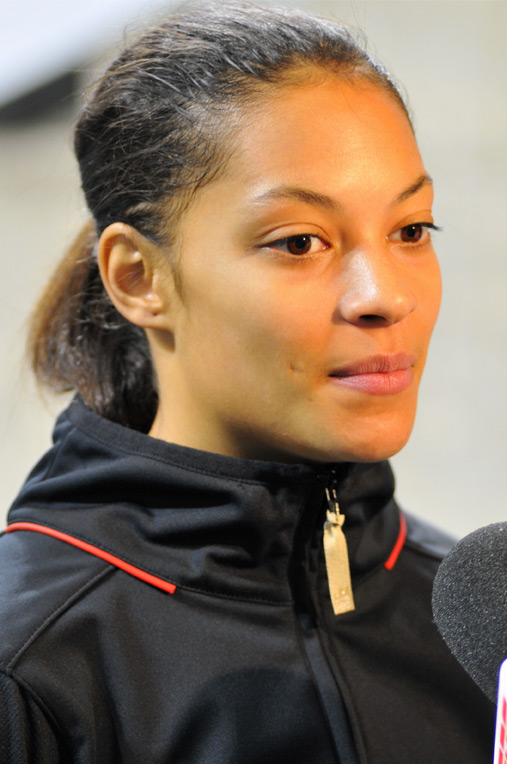

Personal information
- Born: October 1, 1986 (age 39) Saint-Étienne-de-Lauzon, Quebec, Canada
- Height: 1.60 m (5 ft 3 in)
- Weight: 49 kg (108 lb; 7.7 st)

Sport
- Country: Canada
- Sport: Speed skating

Achievements and titles
- Personal best(s): 500 m: 44.116 (2006); 1000 m: 1:31.031 (2006); 1500 m: 2:22.899 (2005); 3000 m: 5:16.804 (2006)
Medal record
Women's short track speed skating
Representing Canada
Olympic Games
Silver medal – second place	2006 Turin	3000 m relay
Silver medal – second place	2010 Vancouver	3000 m relay
World Championships
Gold medal – first place	2005 Beijing	3000 m relay
Gold medal – first place	2007 Milan	500 m
Silver medal – second place	2006 Minneapolis	3000 m relay
Silver medal – second place	2008 Gangneung	3000 m relay
Silver medal – second place	2010 Sofia	500 m
Silver medal – second place	2010 Sofia	3000 m relay
Bronze medal – third place	2006 Minneapolis	Overall
Bronze medal – third place	2006 Minneapolis	500 m
Bronze medal – third place	2006 Minneapolis	1000 m
Bronze medal – third place	2007 Milan	Overall
Bronze medal – third place	2007 Milan	3000 m
Bronze medal – third place	2008 Gangneung	500 m
Bronze medal – third place	2008 Gangneung	1000 m
Bronze medal – third place	2009 Vienna	3000 m relay
World Team Championships
Silver medal – second place	2010 Bormio	Team
Bronze medal – third place	2005 Chuncheon	Team
Bronze medal – third place	2006 Montreal	Team
Bronze medal – third place	2007 Budapest	Team
Bronze medal – third place	2008 Harbin	Team

Kalyna Roberge (born October 1, 1986) is a Canadian short track speed skater.

Born in Saint-Étienne-de-Lauzon, Quebec, Roberge has won a gold medal in the 3000m relay at the 2005 World Championships. She also placed third overall at the 2005 World Junior Championships including a gold medal in the 500m. She also won a gold medal at a World Cup event in the Netherlands in the 3000m relay. At the 2006 Winter Olympics, Roberge placed fourth in the 500m. Along with Alanna Kraus, Tania Vicent and Anouk Leblanc-Boucher, Roberge won a silver medal in the 3000m relay.

She skated for Canada at the 2010 Winter Olympics. On February 24, she won a silver medal in the 3000 metre relay, along with Jessica Gregg, Tania Vicent and Marianne St-Gelais.

== See also ==
- List of Canadian sports personalities
