= Matthew Jasper =

British speed skater

Personal information
- Full name: Matthew James Jasper
- Nationality: British
- Born: 12 September 1972 (age 53) Long Eaton, England
- Height: 165 cm (5 ft 5 in)

Sport
- Sport: Short track speed skating
Medal record
Men's short track speed skating
Representing Great Britain
World Championships
Silver medal – second place	1991 Sydney	1000 m
Bronze medal – third place	1991 Sydney	5000 m relay
Silver medal – second place	1992 Denver	5000 m relay
European Championships
Gold medal – first place	1997 Malmö	5000 m relay
Gold medal – first place	1998 Budapest	5000 m relay
Bronze medal – third place	1999 Oberstdorf	5000 m relay
Silver medal – second place	2000 Bormio	5000 m relay
Silver medal – second place	2001 The Hague	5000 m relay

Matthew James "Matt" Jasper (born 12 September 1972) is a British short track speed skater. He competed at the 1992 Winter Olympics and the 1998 Winter Olympics.
