= Yun Chol =

North Korean speed skater (born 1975)

Personal information
- Nationality: North Korean
- Born: 1 January 1975 (age 50)

Sport
- Sport: Short track speed skating

Yun Chol (born 1 January 1975,Korean: 윤철) is a North Korean short track speed skater. He competed in two events at the 1998 Winter Olympics.
