= Maureen de Lange =

Dutch speed skater

Personal information
- Nationality: Dutch
- Born: 25 October 1978 (age 46); Leiderdorp, Netherlands

Sport
- Sport: Short track speed skating

Maureen de Lange (born 25 October 1978) is a Dutch short track speed skater. She competed in the women's 3000 metre relay event at the 1998 Winter Olympics.
