= Yelena Tikhanina =

Russian speed skater

Personal information
- Nationality: Russian
- Born: 27 May 1977 (age 49) Leningrad, Soviet Union

Sport
- Sport: Short track speed skating
Medal record
Women's short track speed skating
Representing Russia
World Team Championships
Bronze medal – third place	1993 Budapest	Team

Yelena Tikhanina (Russian: Елена Валерьевна Тиханина, born 27 May 1977) is a Russian short track speed skater. She competed at the 1994 Winter Olympics and the 1998 Winter Olympics.
