= Karen Cashman =

Short-track speed skater

Personal information
- Born: December 15, 1971 (age 54)
Medal record
Women's short track speed skating
Representing the United States
Olympic Games
Bronze medal – third place	1994 Lillehammer	3000 m relay

Karen Cashman (born December 15, 1971) is an American short track speed skater. She won a bronze medal in the 3000m Short Track Relay Women at the 1994 Lillehammer Winter Olympics. She then suffered a career-ending injury after a bad crash. After her speedskating career, she became a high school French teacher.
