= Marinella Canclini =

Italian speed skater

Personal information
- Born: 27 February 1974 (age 52) Bormio, Italy

Sport
- Country: Italy
- Sport: Short track speed skating
Medal record
Women's short track speed skating
Representing Italy
World Championships
Gold medal – first place	1996 The Hague	1000 m
Bronze medal – third place	1996 The Hague	500 m
World Team Championships
Gold medal – first place	1993 Budapest	Team
Silver medal – second place	1996 Lake Placid	Team
Bronze medal – third place	1994 Cambridge	Team
European Championships
Gold medal – first place	1997 Malmö	500 m
Gold medal – first place	1997 Malmö	1000 m
Gold medal – first place	1997 Malmö	3000 m
Gold medal – first place	1997 Malmö	3000 m relay
Gold medal – first place	1997 Malmö	Overall
Bronze medal – third place	1998 Budapest	500 m
Gold medal – first place	1998 Budapest	1000 m
Gold medal – first place	1998 Budapest	1500 m
Gold medal – first place	1998 Budapest	3000 m
Gold medal – first place	1998 Budapest	3000 m relay
Gold medal – first place	1998 Budapest	Overall
Gold medal – first place	1999 Oberstdorf	500 m
Silver medal – second place	1999 Oberstdorf	1000 m
Silver medal – second place	1999 Oberstdorf	1500 m
Gold medal – first place	1999 Oberstdorf	3000 m
Gold medal – first place	1999 Oberstdorf	3000 m relay
Gold medal – first place	1999 Oberstdorf	Overall
Gold medal – first place	2002 Grenoble	3000 m relay

Marinella Canclini (born 27 February 1974) is an Italian short track speed skater. She competed at the 1992, 1994, 1998 and the 2002 Winter Olympics.
