= Anouk Leblanc-Boucher =

Short track speed skater

Medal record

Women's short track speed skating

Representing Canada

Olympic Games
Silver medal – second place	2006 Turin	3000m relay
Bronze medal – third place	2006 Turin	500m

World Championships
Silver medal – second place	2006 Minneapolis	3000m relay

World Team Championships
Bronze medal – third place	2005 Chuncheon	Team
Bronze medal – third place	2006 Montreal	Team

Anouk Leblanc-Boucher (born October 21, 1984, in Prévost, Quebec) is a Canadian short track speed skating athlete at the 2006 Winter Olympics.

A student in ecology at the Université du Québec à Montréal (UQAM), she won a bronze medal in the 500m short track speed skating event on February 15, 2006, at the Winter Olympics. She finished ahead of fellow Canadian Kalyna Roberge with a time of 0:44.759.

On February 22, along with Alanna Kraus, Tania Vicent, Amanda Overland and Kalyna Roberge, Leblanc-Boucher helped win a silver medal for Canada in the women's 3000m relay.

Leblanc-Boucher announced her pregnancy in 2006 and gave birth to her first child, William, born in late June 2007. She went on to have two more children, Ben and Stella, and had planned to compete at the 2010 Winter Olympics in her home country but could not qualify.

Leblanc-Boucher made headlines in February 2014 when she posted an advertisement on Kijiji selling her Olympic silver medal and the skates she competed in from the 2006 Winter Olympics. After being inspired watching the 2014 Winter Olympics in Russia, she expressed interest in competing in the sport once again, seeking offers that would help with her finances. Her asking prices were listed at $1 million for the medal and $7,000 for the skates, excluding the individual bronze medal she won in the 500m race. In March 2014, it was reported she would not have to sell her medal or skates as her Kijiji advertisement resulted in sponsor offers to help fund her comeback at the 2018 Winter Olympics in South Korea.

Leblanc-Boucher now plans to resume training to return to competition in preparation for the upcoming Olympic season.
