= Hyo-Jung Kim =

American speed skater

Personal information
- Nationality: American
- Born: November 6, 1988 (age 36); Seoul, South Korea

Sport
- Sport: Short track speed skating

Hyo-Jung Kim (born November 6, 1988) is an American short track speed skater. She competed in four events at the 2006 Winter Olympics. Her father Soo-Hong, a construction executive, lived for twelve years in Orange County, California, and naturalized as a U.S. citizen. He returned to South Korea in 1988 due to his job, shortly before Hyo-Jung was born. She grew up in both Seoul and southern California, and did her early training in skating in South Korea before moving to Colorado Springs, Colorado, where she continued her training at the United States Olympic Training Center.
