= Ellen Wiegers =

Dutch speed skater

Personal information
- Nationality: Dutch
- Born: 1 May 1980 (age 44); Hengelo, Netherlands

Sport
- Sport: Short track speed skating

Ellen Wiegers (born 1 May 1980) is a Dutch short track speed skater. She competed in three events at the 1998 Winter Olympics.
