= Erin Porter (speed skater) =

American speed skater

Personal information
- Born: December 12, 1978 (age 46); Saratoga Springs, New York, United States

Sport
- Sport: Short track speed skating

Erin Porter (born December 12, 1978) is an American short track speed skater. She competed at the 1998 Winter Olympics and the 2002 Winter Olympics.
