= Melanie de Lange =

Dutch speed skater

Personal information
- Nationality: Dutch
- Born: 25 October 1978 (age 46); Leiderdorp, Netherlands

Sport
- Sport: Short track speed skating

Melanie de Lange (born 25 October 1978) is a Dutch former short track speed skater. She competed in two events at the 1998 Winter Olympics.
