= Barbara Baldissera =

Italian speed skater

Personal information
- Nationality: Italian
- Born: 12 January 1978 (age 47); Bormio, Italy

Sport
- Sport: Short track speed skating

Barbara Baldissera (born 12 January 1978) is an Italian former short track speed skater. She competed at the 1994 Winter Olympics and the 1998 Winter Olympics.
