= Tania Vicent =

Short track speed skater

Personal information
- Born: January 13, 1976 (age 50) Laval, Quebec
- Height: 1.65 m (5 ft 5 in)

Sport
- Country: Canada
- Sport: Speed skating
Medal record
Women's Short track speed skating
Representing Canada
Olympic Games
Silver medal – second place	2006 Turin	3000 m relay
Silver medal – second place	2010 Vancouver	3000 m relay
Bronze medal – third place	1998 Nagano	3000 m relay
Bronze medal – third place	2002 Salt Lake City	3000 m relay
World Championships
Gold medal – first place	2005 Beijing	3000 m relay
Silver medal – second place	2003 Warsaw	3000 m relay
Silver medal – second place	2006 Minneapolis	3000 m relay
Silver medal – second place	2008 Gangneung	3000 m relay
Silver medal – second place	2010 Bormio	Team
Silver medal – second place	2010 Sofia	3000 m relay
Bronze medal – third place	1995 Gjøvik	3000 m relay
Bronze medal – third place	2000 Sheffield	3000 m relay
Bronze medal – third place	2002 Montreal	3000 m relay

Tania Vicent (born January 13, 1976, in Laval, Quebec) is a Canadian short track speed skater, who competed at the 2006 Winter Olympics. On February 22, along with Alanna Kraus, Anouk Leblanc-Boucher and Kalyna Roberge, Vicent won a silver medal for Canada in the 3000m relay. She won the bronze medal in Nagano and at Salt Lake City.

She won her fourth consecutive Olympic 3,000 metre relay medal at the 2010 Winter Olympics, skating alongside Jessica Gregg, Kalyna Roberge and Marianne St-Gelais.
