= Dave Versteeg =

Dutch speed skater

Personal information
- Nationality: Dutch
- Born: 27 March 1976 (age 48); Leiden, Netherlands

Sport
- Sport: Short track speed skating

Dave Versteeg (born 27 March 1976) is a Dutch short track speed skater. He competed in two events at the 1998 Winter Olympics.
