= Allison Baver =

Short-track speed skater

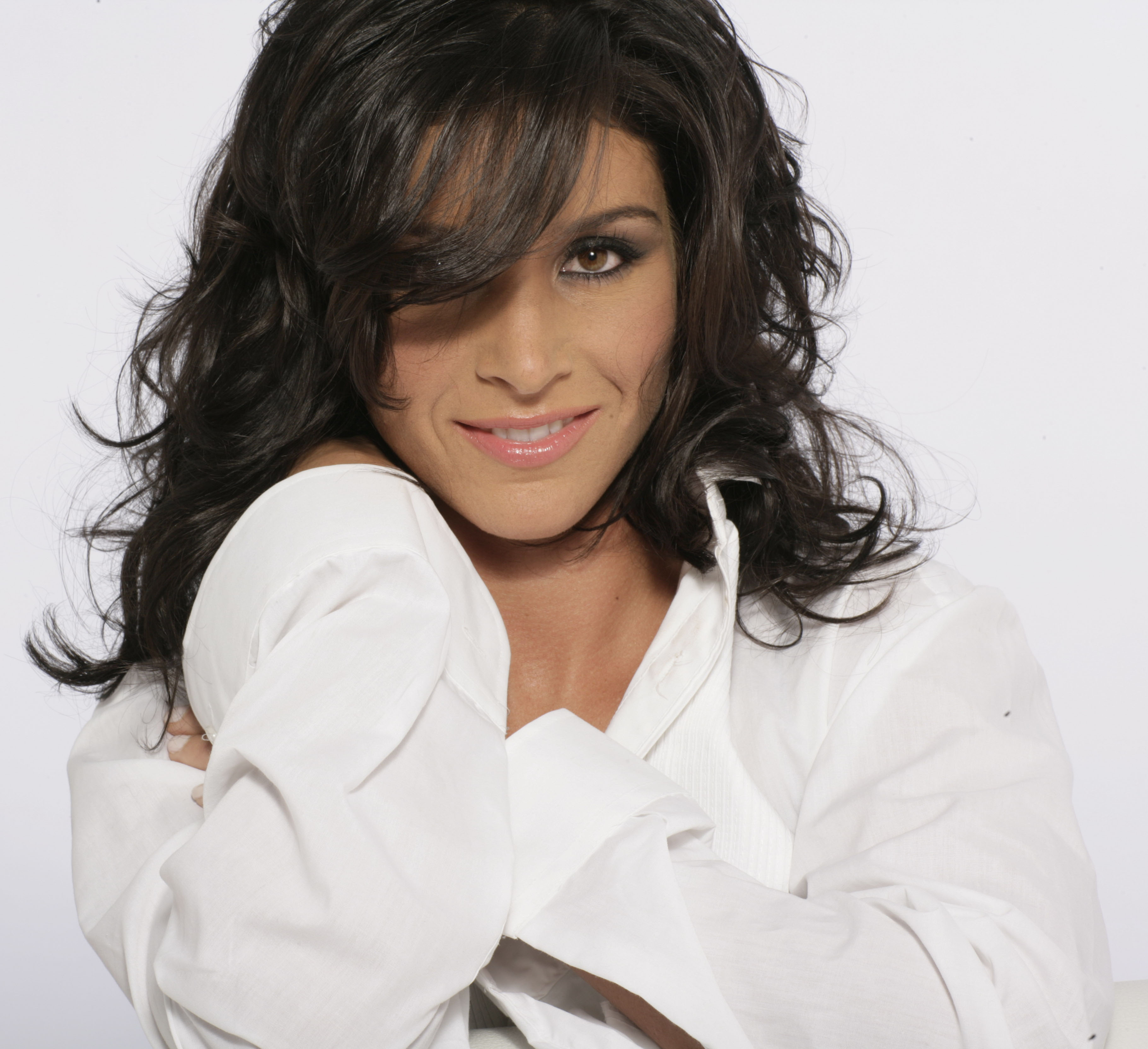
- Baver by Fadil Barisha for Wilhelmina Models New York

Personal information
- Born: August 11, 1980 (age 46) Reading, Pennsylvania, U.S.
- Height: 5 ft 3 in (1.60 m)
- Weight: 126 lb (57 kg)
- Website: www.allisonbaver.com

Sport
- Country: United States of America
- Sport: Short track speed skating
- Events: Women's 500m, 1000m, 1500m, 3000m relay
- Retired: 2014

Achievements and titles
- Personal bests: 500 m: 44.535 (2008) 1000 m: 1:31.151 (2008) 1500 m: 2:20.015 (2008)
Medal record
Women's short track speed skating
Representing the United States
Olympic Games
| Bronze medal – third place | 2010 Vancouver | 3000 m relay |

Allison Baver (born August 11, 1980) is an American retired short track speed skater. A member of the U.S. short track speed skating squad beginning in 2002, Baver earned multiple medals in ISU World Cup competition. Baver competed in the 500m, 1000m, 1500m, and 3000m relay events and trained with the US permanent winter sports Olympic team in Salt Lake City, Utah. In the 2005–2006 season, she was ranked third overall in world rankings. In 2010, she won a bronze medal at the 2010 Winter Olympics in Vancouver.

In December 2021, Baver was indicted for allegedly defrauding the U.S. government during COVID-19 with fraudulent business claims in order to receive $10 million. According to the indictment, she claimed that her company, which she formed in 2019, had as many as 430 employees and a monthly payroll of over $4 million. On June 29, 2023, a federal jury convicted Baver of two counts of making false statements designed to influence a bank, one count of money laundering, and one count of contempt. She faces up to 40 years in prison. In October 2024, Baver's sentencing was delayed after her defense counsel withdrew. The judge in her case raised the possibility that Baver could file an appeal on the grounds of ineffective counsel. In September 2025, Baver requested a new trial.

== Early life and education ==
Baver was born in Reading, Pennsylvania, on August 11, 1980. At age eleven, Baver competed in the National Roller Skating Championships in Philadelphia. At Wilson High School, she was a soccer player and cheerleader. She did not take up short track speed skating until her junior year of high school. In 2003, Baver graduated from Penn State with a Bachelor of Arts degree in marketing and management. Baver earned an MBA from the New York Institute of Technology.

== Athletic career ==
Baver competed in the 2002 Winter Olympics in Salt Lake City. At the 2006 Winter Olympics, in Turin, Italy, Baver finished seventh in the Women's 500 m competition, following a third-place finish in Semifinal A and a collision with the Czech Republic's Kateřina Novotná in Final B, which took her out of the race for fifth place.

On February 25, 2007, Baver won her first U.S. National Championship. Between 2008 and 2010, Baver was represented by Wilhelmina Sports.

On February 8, 2009, Baver and teammate Katherine Reutter collided on the third lap of the 1500 m race in Sofia, Bulgaria. Baver fractured her leg in multiple places.

At the 2010 Winter Olympics in Vancouver, Baver competed in three events. In the 1500 m, Baver did not make it past the semifinals. In the 1000 m, Baver was disqualified in the heats. In the 3000 m relay, Baver's U.S. team finished fourth but were awarded the bronze medal after one of the teams was disqualified for an infraction. Baver competed in the relay heats and qualified for a medal.

Baver in 2016 was elected to a four-year term as one of seven vice presidents of the U.S. Olympians and Paralympians Association.

== Film industry ==
On December 1, 2020, Variety reported that Baver's production company announced an upcoming slate of movies, television shows and documentaries. In addition to executive producing and acting, Baver serves as a series creator.

Baver appeared as a nurse and stand-in actress on Season 3 of Yellowstone, released in 2020, with Kevin Costner.

In 2020, Baver appeared as Summer Sanders, a reporter, in the film Six Feet Apart. It was filmed and took place during the COVID-19 pandemic.

In 2021, Baver appeared in an uncredited role as Marsha Tanner in the film No Man of God. It had its world premiere at the Tribeca Film Festival on June 11, 2021, and was released in the United States on August 27, 2021, by RLJE Films. It was also executive produced by Allison Baver Entertainment.

== Fraud conviction ==
On December 15, 2021, Baver was charged with fraudulently applying for $10 million in COVID relief payments and funneling some of the money to Elijah Wood's production company SpectreVision to fund the 2021 film, No Man of God, starring Wood. Prosecutors said Baver submitted eight Paycheck Protection Program loan applications in April 2020 seeking $10 million for her entertainment firm. In each request, Baver said her average monthly payroll was as much as $4.7 million, but she actually had no payroll at all, court documents show. Her criminal case is filed as United States v. Baver (2:21-cr-00520).

On January 18, 2022, Baver pled not guilty to nine federal charges. Following two postponements, her trial began on June 26, 2023. On June 29, 2023, a federal jury convicted Baver of two counts of making false statements to a bank, one count of money laundering, and one count of contempt. She will remain out of custody until her sentencing. Baver could spend up to 40 years in prison. It is expected she will receive 78 months in federal prison followed by 5 years supervised release. In October 2024, Baver's sentencing was delayed after her defense counsel withdrew. The judge in her case raised the possibility that Baver could file an appeal on the grounds of ineffective counsel. In September 2025, Baver requested a new trial.

== See also ==
- List of Pennsylvania State University Olympians
- World Fit
