= List of World Short Track Speed Skating Championships medalists =

The International Skating Union has organised the World Short Track Speed Skating Championships since 1976.

== Current program ==
=== Men ===
==== 500 m ====
Year	Gold	Silver	Bronze
1976	(United States) Alan Rattray	(Canada) Gaetan Boucher	(United States) Bob Fenn
1977	(Canada) Gaetan Boucher	(United States) Craig Kressler	(Japan) Hiroshi Toda
1978	(United States) Alan Rattray	(United Kingdom) Harry Spragg	(Australia) Jim Lynch
1979	(Australia) Jim Lynch	(Canada) Louis Grenier	(Canada) Louis Baril
1980	(France) Marc Bella	(Australia) Shane Warren	(Canada) Gaetan Boucher
1981	(Australia) Michael Richmond	(United Kingdom) Stuart Horsepool	(Netherlands) Menno Boelsma
1982	(Canada) Guy Daignault	(Canada) Gaetan Boucher	(Canada) Louis Grenier
1983	(Canada) Louis Grenier	(Canada) Guy Daignault	(United States) Patrick Moore
1984	(Canada) Guy Daignault	(Canada) Michel Daignault	(United States) David Besteman
1985	(Canada) Louis Grenier	(Japan) Toshinobu Kawai	(Japan) Tatsuyoshi Ishihara
1986	(Japan) Tatsuyoshi Ishihara	(Canada) Robert Dubreuil	(United Kingdom) Wilf O'Reilly
1987	(Canada) Robert Dubreuil	(Canada) Louis Grenier	(Canada) Michel Daignault
1988			
1989	(Canada) Mark Lackie	(Canada) Michel Daignault	(Japan) Yuichi Akasaka
1990	(United Kingdom) Wilf O'Reilly	(Italy) Hugo Herrnhof	(Italy) Orazio Fagone
1991	(South Korea) Kim Ki-hoon	(United Kingdom) Wilf O'Reilly	(Canada) Mark Lackie
1992	(South Korea) Kim Ki-hoon	(United Kingdom) Wilf O'Reilly	(South Korea) Lee Joon-ho
1993	(Italy) Mirko Vuillermin	(Canada) Marc Gagnon	(United States) Andy Gabel
1994	(Canada) Frédéric Blackburn	(Canada) Derrick Campbell	(South Korea) Kim Ki-hoon
1995	(South Korea) Chae Ji-hoon	(Italy) Mirko Vuillermin	(Italy) Maurizio Carnino
1996	(Italy) Orazio Fagone	(Italy) Mirko Vuillermin	(Canada) Frédéric Blackburn
1997	(Canada) Derrick Campbell	(South Korea) Kim Dong-sung	(Japan) Satoru Terao
1998	(China) Feng Kai	(Canada) Éric Bédard	(China) Yuan Ye
1999	(China) Li Jiajun	(United States) Apolo Anton Ohno	(Italy) Fabio Carta
2000	(Canada) Éric Bédard	(United States) Daniel Weinstein	(Japan) Satoru Terao
2001	(China) Li Jiajun	(Canada) Jonathan Guilmette	(Italy) Maurizio Carnino
2002	(South Korea) Kim Dong-sung	(Italy) Fabio Carta	(United States) Ron Biondo
2003	(China) Li Haonan	(China) Li Ye	(South Korea) Song Suk-woo
2004	(South Korea) Song Suk-woo	(China) Li Haonan	(China) Li Ye
2005	(Canada) François-Louis Tremblay	(Canada) Charles Hamelin	(South Korea) Ahn Hyun-soo
2006	(Canada) François-Louis Tremblay	(China) Li Haonan	(South Korea) Lee Ho-suk
2007	(Canada) Charles Hamelin	(Canada) François-Louis Tremblay	(South Korea) Ahn Hyun-soo
2008	(United States) Apolo Anton Ohno	(Canada) Charles Hamelin	(South Korea) Song Kyung-taek
2009	(Canada) Charles Hamelin	(South Korea) Kwak Yoon-gy	(Canada) Olivier Jean
2010	(China) Liang Wenhao	(Canada) François Hamelin	(Canada) François-Louis Tremblay
2011	(United States) Simon Cho	(Canada) Olivier Jean	(China) Liang Wenhao
2012	(Canada) Olivier Jean	(Canada) Charles Hamelin	(South Korea) Kwak Yoon-gy
2013	(China) Liang Wenhao	(Russia) Victor An	(Netherlands) Freek van der Wart
2014	(China) Wu Dajing	(United States) J. R. Celski	(Canada) Charles Hamelin
2015	(China) Wu Dajing	(Hungary) Shaolin Sándor Liu	(China) Han Tianyu
2016	(Hungary) Shaolin Sándor Liu	(China) Wu Dajing	(Hungary) Shaoang Liu
2017	(Netherlands) Sjinkie Knegt	(China) Wu Dajing	(South Korea) Seo Yi-ra
2018	(South Korea) Hwang Dae-heon	(China) Ren Ziwei	(Russia) Semion Elistratov
2019	(South Korea) Hwang Dae-heon	(China) Wu Dajing	(China) Ren Ziwei
2021	(Hungary) Shaoang Liu	RSU Semion Elistratov	(Italy) Pietro Sighel
2022	(Hungary) Shaoang Liu	(France) Quentin Fercoq	(Belgium) Stijn Desmet
2023	(Italy) Pietro Sighel	(Canada) Steven Dubois	(Netherlands) Jens van 't Wout
2024	(China) Lin Xiaojun	(Kazakhstan) Denis Nikisha	(Canada) Jordan Pierre-Gilles
2025	(Canada) Steven Dubois	(Kazakhstan) Denis Nikisha	(Netherlands) Jens van 't Wout
2026	(Canada) Steven Dubois	(Netherlands) Jens van 't Wout	(Turkey) Furkan Akar
2027			

==== 1000 m ====
Year	Gold	Silver	Bronze
1976	(United States) Alan Rattray	(Canada) Gaetan Boucher	(United Kingdom) Philip Walker
1977	(Canada) Gaetan Boucher	(United Kingdom) Steve Pearce	(United States) Craig Kressler
1978	(Australia) Jim Lynch	(United States) Alan Rattray	(United Kingdom) Malcom Power
1979	(Canada) Louis Baril	(Japan) Hiroshi Toda	(Canada) Gaetan Boucher
1980	(Canada) Gaetan Boucher	(Canada) Louis Baril	(Japan) Kenichi Sugio
1981	(Canada) Benoît Baril	(Canada) Gaetan Boucher	(United Kingdom) Stuart Horsepool
1982	(Canada) Guy Daignault	(Canada) Gaetan Boucher	(United Kingdom) Stuart Horsepool
1983	(Canada) Louis Grenier	(Canada) Guy Daignault	(Canada) Michel Delisle
1984	(Japan) Tatsuyoshi Ishihara	(Canada) Guy Daignault	(Canada) Michel Daignault
1985	(Japan) Toshinobu Kawai	(Canada) Louis Grenier	(Canada) Michel Delisle
1986	(Canada) Guy Daignault	(Japan) Yuichi Akasaka	(Japan) Tatsuyoshi Ishihara
1987	(Japan) Toshinobu Kawai	(Italy) Orazio Fagone	(Japan) Yuichi Akasaka
1988			
1989	(South Korea) Kim Ki-hoon	(United Kingdom) Wilf O'Reilly	(Canada) Mark Lackie
1990	(Japan) Tsutomu Kawasaki	(Canada) Michel Daignault	(South Korea) Lee Joon-ho
1991	(United Kingdom) Wilf O'Reilly	(United Kingdom) Matthew Jasper	(Belgium) Geert Blanchart
1992	(South Korea) Kim Ki-hoon	(New Zealand) Michael McMillen	(South Korea) Lee Joon-ho
1993	(Canada) Marc Gagnon	(South Korea) Lee Joon-ho	(Canada) Sylvain Gagnon
1994	(Canada) Marc Gagnon	(Canada) Frédéric Blackburn	(Canada) Derrick Campbell
1995	(Canada) Marc Gagnon	(Canada) Frédéric Blackburn	(Italy) Maurizio Carnino
1996	(China) Li Jiajun	(Canada) Marc Gagnon	(South Korea) Chae Ji-hoon
1997	(South Korea) Kim Dong-sung	(South Korea) Lee Jun-hwan	(China) Feng Kai
1998	(Canada) Marc Gagnon	(Japan) Satoru Terao	(Italy) Fabio Carta
1999	(Japan) Satoru Terao	(South Korea) Kim Dong-sung	(Canada) Andrew Quinn
2000	(China) Li Jiajun	(China) An Yulong	(United States) Daniel Weinstein
2001	(China) Li Jiajun	(United States) Apolo Anton Ohno	(South Korea) Min Ryoung
2002	(South Korea) Kim Dong-sung	(South Korea) Ahn Hyun-soo	(Canada) Éric Bédard
2003	(China) Li Jiajun	(South Korea) Ahn Hyun-soo	(Canada) Jean-François Monette
2004	(South Korea) Ahn Hyun-soo	(China) Li Jiajun	(Italy) Fabio Carta
2005	(United States) Apolo Anton Ohno	(South Korea) Ahn Hyun-soo	(China) Li Jiajun
2006	(South Korea) Ahn Hyun-soo	(South Korea) Lee Ho-suk	(Canada) Charles Hamelin
2007	(South Korea) Ahn Hyun-soo	(Canada) Charles Hamelin	(United States) Apolo Anton Ohno
2008	(South Korea) Lee Ho-suk	(United States) Apolo Anton Ohno	(South Korea) Song Kyung-taek
2009	(South Korea) Lee Ho-suk	(United States) Apolo Anton Ohno	(United States) J. R. Celski
2010	(South Korea) Lee Ho-suk	(South Korea) Kwak Yoon-gy	(United States) J. R. Celski
2011	(South Korea) Noh Jin-kyu	(Canada) Charles Hamelin	(China) Liang Wenhao
2012	(South Korea) Kwak Yoon-gy	(South Korea) Noh Jin-kyu	(Canada) Charles Hamelin
2013	(South Korea) Sin Da-woon	(Netherlands) Sjinkie Knegt	(Canada) Charles Hamelin
2014	(Russia) Victor An	(Netherlands) Sjinkie Knegt	(South Korea) Park Se-yeong
2015	(South Korea) Park Se-yeong	(Canada) Charles Hamelin	(China) Shi Jingnan
2016	(Canada) Charles Hamelin	(Canada) Samuel Girard	(China) Wu Dajing
2017	(South Korea) Seo Yi-ra	(Hungary) Shaoang Liu	(Canada) Charles Hamelin
2018	(Canada) Charles Hamelin	(South Korea) Lim Hyo-jun	(Netherlands) Sjinkie Knegt
2019	(South Korea) Lim Hyo-jun	(South Korea) Hwang Dae-heon	(Russia) Semion Elistratov
2021	(Hungary) Shaolin Sándor Liu	(Hungary) Shaoang Liu	(Italy) Pietro Sighel
2022	(Hungary) Shaoang Liu	(South Korea) Lee June-seo	(South Korea) Kwak Yoon-gy
2023	(South Korea) Park Ji-won	(Belgium) Stijn Desmet	(Canada) Steven Dubois
2024	(Canada) William Dandjinou	(Italy) Pietro Sighel	(Italy) Luca Spechenhauser
2025	(Canada) Steven Dubois	(Canada) William Dandjinou	(Italy) Pietro Sighel
2026	(South Korea) Rim Jong-un	(Netherlands) Jens van 't Wout	(United Kingdom) Niall Treacy
2027			

==== 1500 m ====
Year	Gold	Silver	Bronze
1976	(United States) Alan Rattray	(Australia) Colin Coates	(United States) Jack Mortell
1977	(Japan) Hiroshi Toda	(United States) Craig Kressler	(Canada) Gaetan Boucher
1978	(Australia) Jim Lynch	(United Kingdom) Harry Spragg	(United Kingdom) Alan Luke
1979	(Japan) Hiroshi Toda	(United States) Nick Thometz	(Canada) Louis Baril
1980	(Canada) Gaetan Boucher	(Canada) Louis Grenier	(Australia) Rodney Bates
1981	(Canada) Louis Baril	(Canada) Benoît Baril	(Japan) Kenichi Sugio
1982	(Canada) Guy Daignault	(Canada) Gaetan Boucher	(United States) Steve Merrifield
1983	(Canada) Michel Delisle	(Japan) Toshinobu Kawai	(Canada) Louis Grenier
1984	(Japan) Yuichi Akasaka	(United Kingdom) Wilf O'Reilly	(Australia) Danny Kah
1985	(Japan) Tatsuyoshi Ishihara	(Netherlands) Charles Veldhoven	(Japan) Toshinobu Kawai
1986	(Japan) Tatsuyoshi Ishihara	(Canada) Michel Daignault	(Canada) Robert Dubreuil
1987	(Canada) Guy Daignault	(Netherlands) Charles Veldhoven	(Japan) Toshinobu Kawai
1988			
1989	(Canada) Michel Daignault	(South Korea) Kim Ki-hoon	(Canada) Mark Lackie
1990	(Japan) Tatsuyoshi Ishihara	(Japan) Yuichi Akasaka	(Belgium) Geert Blanchart
1991	(South Korea) Lee Joon-ho	(Japan) Tsutomu Kawasaki	(Italy) Hugo Herrnhof
1992	(South Korea) Kim Ki-hoon	(South Korea) Mo Ji-soo	(Japan) Tatsuyoshi Ishihara
1993	(Canada) Sylvain Gagnon	(South Korea) Kim Ki-hoon	(South Korea) Chae Ji-hoon
1994	(South Korea) Chae Ji-hoon	(Canada) Marc Gagnon	(Canada) Derrick Campbell
1995	(South Korea) Chae Ji-hoon	(United States) Eric Flaim	(South Korea) Lee Joon-ho
1996	(Canada) Marc Gagnon	(United Kingdom) Nicky Gooch	(South Korea) Chae Ji-hoon
1997	(Canada) Marc Gagnon	(Italy) Orazio Fagone	(Italy) Mirko Vuillermin
1998	(Canada) Marc Gagnon	(Italy) Fabio Carta	(South Korea) Kim Dong-sung
1999	(Italy) Fabio Carta	(Japan) Satoru Terao	(China) Li Jiajun
2000	(South Korea) Min Ryoung	(Canada) Éric Bédard	(Japan) Satoru Terao
2001	(Canada) Marc Gagnon	(South Korea) Min Ryoung (Japan) Satoru Terao	—N/a
2002	(South Korea) Kim Dong-sung	(Canada) Jonathan Guilmette	(United States) Rusty Smith
2003	(South Korea) Ahn Hyun-soo	(South Korea) Song Suk-woo	(South Korea) Lee Seung-jae
2004	(South Korea) Ahn Hyun-soo	(Canada) Jonathan Guilmette	(South Korea) Song Suk-woo
2005	(South Korea) Ahn Hyun-soo	(Canada) François-Louis Tremblay	(South Korea) Lee Seung-hoon
2006	(South Korea) Ahn Hyun-soo	(South Korea) Lee Ho-suk	(South Korea) Oh Se-jong
2007	(United States) Apolo Anton Ohno	(Italy) Nicola Rodigari	(South Korea) Ahn Hyun-soo
2008	(South Korea) Song Kyung-taek	(South Korea) Lee Ho-suk	(United States) Charles Leveille
2009	(South Korea) Lee Ho-suk	(South Korea) Kwak Yoon-gy	(United States) J. R. Celski
2010	(South Korea) Kwak Yoon-gy	(South Korea) Sung Si-bak	(South Korea) Lee Ho-suk
2011	(South Korea) Noh Jin-kyu	(Canada) Charles Hamelin	(United States) Jeff Simon
2012	(South Korea) Noh Jin-kyu	(South Korea) Kwak Yoon-gy	(South Korea) Sin Da-woon
2013	(South Korea) Sin Da-woon	(South Korea) Kim Yun-jae	(Canada) Charles Hamelin
2014	(Canada) Charles Hamelin	(China) Han Tianyu	(South Korea) Park Se-yeong
2015	(Russia) Semion Elistratov	(Netherlands) Sjinkie Knegt	(Canada) Charles Hamelin
2016	(China) Han Tianyu	(Hungary) Shaoang Liu	(South Korea) Park Se-yeong
2017	(South Korea) Sin Da-woon	(Canada) Samuel Girard	(South Korea) Seo Yi-ra
2018	(Canada) Charles Hamelin	(South Korea) Lim Hyo-jun	(Russia) Semion Elistratov
2019	(South Korea) Lim Hyo-jun	(Canada) Samuel Girard	(South Korea) Lee June-seo
2021	(Canada) Charles Hamelin	(Netherlands) Itzhak de Laat	RSU Semion Elistratov
2022	(Hungary) Shaoang Liu	(Canada) Pascal Dion	(Belgium) Stijn Desmet
2023	(South Korea) Park Ji-won	(Italy) Pietro Sighel	(Canada) Pascal Dion
2024	(China) Sun Long	(Netherlands) Jens van 't Wout	(Australia) Brendan Corey
2025	(Canada) William Dandjinou	(Belgium) Stijn Desmet	(China) Liu Shaoang
2026	(South Korea) Rim Jong-un	(Italy) Thomas Nadalini	(Belgium) Stijn Desmet
2027			

==== 5000 m relay ====
Year	Gold	Silver	Bronze
1976	United States	Great Britain	Belgium
1977	Great Britain	Canada	Japan
1978			
1979			
1980	Canada	Australia	Japan
1981	Canada	Great Britain	Japan
1982			
1983	Canada	Australia	Japan
1984	Canada	Netherlands	Netherlands
1985	Japan	Canada	Great Britain
1986	Netherlands	Canada	Japan
1987	Netherlands	Italy	United States
1988	Italy	Netherlands	South Korea
1989	Netherlands	Canada	South Korea
1990	Netherlands	Canada	China
1991	Australia	New Zealand	Great Britain
1992	Japan	Great Britain	France
1993	New Zealand	Italy	Australia
1994	Japan	Australia	Canada
1995	Canada	Italy	Japan
1996	Italy	South Korea	Canada
1997	South Korea	Canada	Italy
1998	Canada	South Korea	China
1999	China	South Korea	Canada
2000	China	Japan	Italy
2001	United States	Canada	China
2002	South Korea	Canada	China
2003	South Korea; Yeo Jun-hyung; Ahn Hyun-soo; Oh Se-jong; Lee Seung-jae	Canada; Mathieu Turcotte; Jean-François Monette; Jonathan Guilmette; Éric Bédard	China; Sui Baoku; Li Jiajun; Li Haonan; Li Ye
2004	South Korea; Ahn Hyun-soo; Song Suk-woo; Cho Nam-kyu; Kim Hyun-kon	China; Sui Baoku; Li Jiajun; Li Haonan; Li Ye	Italy; Roberto Serra; Nicola Franceschina; Nicola Rodigari; Fabio Carta
2005	Canada; Charles Hamelin; Steve Robillard; François-Louis Tremblay; Mathieu Turcotte	South Korea; Ahn Hyun-soo; Lee Seung-hoon; Seo Ho-jin; Song Kyung-taek; Lee Jae-kyung	United States; Shani Davis; Alex Izykowski; Jordan Malone; Apolo Anton Ohno
2006	Canada; Charles Hamelin; Jonathan Guilmette; François-Louis Tremblay; Mathieu Turcotte; Éric Bédard	China; Cui Liang; Li Haonan; Li Ye; Sui Baoku	United States; Alex Izykowski; J. P. Kepka; Anthony Lobello; Jordan Malone; Rusty Smith
2007	South Korea; Ahn Hyun-soo; Kim Hyun-kon; Song Kyung-taek; Sung Si-bak; Kim Byeong-jun	Canada; Charles Hamelin; Olivier Jean; Jean-François Monette; François-Louis Tremblay	United States; Ryan Bedford; Travis Jayner; Jordan Malone; Apolo Anton Ohno; Anthony Lobello
2008	South Korea; Lee Ho-suk; Lee Seung-hoon; Song Kyung-taek; Sung Si-bak; Kwak Yoon-gy	Canada; François Hamelin; Jean-François Monette; Marc-André Monette; Steve Robillard; Charles Hamelin	Great Britain; Jon Eley; Tom Iveson; Paul Stanley; Paul Worth
2009	United States; Ryan Bedford; J. R. Celski; Jordan Malone; Apolo Ohno	China; Han Jialiang; Liu Xianwei; Song Weilong; Sui Baoku	Japan; Takahiro Fujimoto; Fumihiko Kakubari; Satoshi Sakashita; Yuzo Takamido
2010	South Korea; Kwak Yoon-gy; Lee Ho-suk; Lee Jung-su; Kim Seoung-il	United States; J. R. Celski; Simon Cho; Travis Jayner; Jordan Malone	Germany; Paul Herrmann; Tyson Heung; Sebastian Praus; Robert Seifert
2011	Canada; Michael Gilday; Charles Hamelin; François Hamelin; Olivier Jean	Germany; Robert Becker; Paul Herrmann; Christoph Milz; Robert Seifert; Torsten Kröger	United States; Kyle Carr; Travis Jayner; Anthony Lobello; Jeff Simon; Simon Cho
2012	Canada; Guillaume Bastille; François-Louis Tremblay; Olivier Jean; Liam McFarlane; Charles Hamelin	Netherlands; Niels Kerstholt; Daan Breeuwsma; Freek van der Wart; Sjinkie Knegt	South Korea; Kwak Yoon-gy; Lee Ho-suk; Noh Jin-kyu; Sin Da-woon; Lee Jung-su
2013	Canada; Olivier Jean; Charle Cournoyer; Michael Gilday; Charles Hamelin	Russia; Victor An; Vyacheslav Kurginyan; Semen Elistratov; Vladimir Grigorev	Netherlands; Daan Breeuwsma; Niels Kerstholt; Sjinkie Knegt; Freek van der Wart
2014	Netherlands; Daan Breeuwsma; Niels Kerstholt; Sjinkie Knegt; Freek van der Wart	South Korea; Kim Yun-jae; Lee Han-bin; Park Se-yeong; Sin Da-woon; Lee Ho-suk	Great Britain; Jon Eley; Richard Shoebridge; Paul Stanley; Jack Whelbourne
2015	China; Wu Dajing; Chen Dequan; Xu Hongzhi; Han Tianyu; Shi Jingnan	Hungary; Viktor Knoch; Csaba Burján; Shaolin Sándor Liu; Shaoang Liu	Netherlands; Daan Breeuwsma; Freek van der Wart; Sjinkie Knegt; Mark Prinsen
2016	China; Shi Jingnan; Wu Dajing; Han Tianyu; Xu Hongzhi	Canada; Charle Cournoyer; Alexander Fathoullin; Samuel Girard; Charles Hamelin	South Korea; Kwak Yoon-Gy; Seo Yi-ra; Park Ji-won; Park Se-yeong; Kim Joon-chun
2017	Netherlands; Daan Breeuwsma; Sjinkie Knegt; Itzhak de Laat; Dennis Visser	China; Wu Dajing; Xu Hongzhi; Han Tianyu; Ren Ziwei	Hungary; Viktor Knoch; Csaba Burján; Shaolin Sándor Liu; Shaoang Liu
2018	South Korea; Hwang Dae-heon; Kim Do-kyoum; Kwak Yoon-gy; Lim Hyo-jun; Seo Yi-ra	Canada; Charle Cournoyer; Pascal Dion; Samuel Girard; Charles Hamelin	Japan; Ryosuke Sakazume; Kazuki Yoshinaga; Keita Watanabe; Hiroki Yokoyama
2019	South Korea; Hwang Dae-heon; Lee June-seo; Lim Hyo-jun; Park Ji-won; Hong Kyung-hwan	China; Ren Ziwei; Wu Dajing; Xu Hongzhi; Yang Shuai; Sun Long	Hungary; Csaba Burján; Cole Krueger; Shaolin Sándor Liu; Alex Varnyú
2021	Netherlands; Daan Breeuwsma; Itzhak de Laat; Sjinkie Knegt; Jens van 't Wout	Hungary; Csaba Burján; John-Henry Krueger; Shaoang Liu; Shaolin Sándor Liu; Alex Varnyú	Italy; Yuri Confortola; Tommaso Dotti; Pietro Sighel; Luca Spechenhauser
2022	South Korea; Han Seung-soo; Kwak Yoon-gy; Lee June-seo; Park In-wook	Netherlands; Itzhak de Laat; Friso Emons; Sjinkie Knegt; Sven Roes	Canada; Pascal Dion; Steven Dubois; Charles Hamelin; Jordan Pierre-Gilles; Maxime Laoun
2023	China; Li Wenlong; Lin Xiaojun; Liu Guanyi; Zhong Yuchen; Song Jiahua	Italy; Andrea Cassinelli; Tommaso Dotti; Pietro Sighel; Luca Spechenhauser; Thomas Nadalini	South Korea; Hong Kyung-hwan; Lee June-seo; Lim Yong-jin; Park Ji-won; Lee Dong-hyun
2024	China; Lin Xiaojun; Liu Shaoang; Liu Shaolin; Sun Long; Li Wenlong	South Korea; Hwang Dae-heon; Kim Gun-woo; Lee Jeong-min; Seo Yi-ra; Park Ji-won	Poland; Łukasz Kuczyński; Michał Niewiński; Félix Pigeon; Diané Sellier
2025	Canada; William Dandjinou; Steven Dubois; Maxime Laoun; Félix Roussel; Jordan Pierre-Gilles	China; Li Wenlong; Liu Guanyi; Liu Shaoang; Sun Long; Liu Shaolin	South Korea; Jang Sung-woo; Kim Gun-woo; Lee Jung-su; Park Ji-won; Seo Yi-ra
2026	Canada; Maxime Laoun; William Dandjinou; Félix Roussel; Steven Dubois; Jordan Pierre-Gilles	China; Zhang Bohao; Li Kun; Zhu Yiding; Li Yuheng; Song Guixu	Italy; Pietro Sighel; Luca Spechenhauser; Lorenzo Previtali; Thomas Nadalini
2027			

=== Women ===
==== 500 m ====
Year	Gold	Silver	Bronze
1976	(Canada) Kathy Vogt	(United States) Celeste Chlapaty	(United States) Peggy Hartrich
1977	(Canada) Brenda Webster	(Canada) Kathy Vogt	(Canada) Nancy Dernin
1978	(United States) Patty Lyman	(Canada) Brenda Webster	(United Kingdom) Kay Dibling
1979	(Canada) Sylvie Daigle	(Canada) Kathy Turnbull	(Canada) Anne Girard
1980	(Japan) Mika Kato	(United States) Gloria Bogacki	(Canada) Kathy Turnbull
1981	(Japan) Mika Kato	(Canada) Louise Begin	(United States) Pam Mercer
1982	(Canada) Sylvie Daigle	(Canada) Maryse Perreault	(Canada) Louise Begin
1983	(Canada) Sylvie Daigle	(Japan) Mika Kato	(Canada) Maryse Perreault
1984	(Japan) Mariko Kinoshita	(Canada) Sylvie Daigle	(Japan) Hiromi Takeuchi
1985	(Japan) Eiko Shishii	(United States) Bonnie Blair	(Canada) Susan Auch
1986	(United States) Bonnie Blair	(Canada) Maryse Perreault	(Italy) Cristina Sciolla
1987	(Canada) Eden Donatelli	(Netherlands) Manuela Ossendrijver	(Italy) Cristina Sciolla
1988			
1989	(Italy) Cristina Sciolla	(Canada) Sylvie Daigle	(Canada) Maryse Perreault
1990	(Canada) Sylvie Daigle	(Canada) Eden Donatelli	(Italy) Cristina Sciolla
1991	(China) Zhang Yanmei	(Netherlands) Monique Velzeboer	(China) Guo Hongru
1992	(China) Li Yan	(South Korea) Kim So-hee	(China) Zhen Chunyang
1993	(China) Zhang Yanmei	(Canada) Isabelle Charest	(Canada) Angela Cutrone
1994	(Italy) Marinella Canclini	(Canada) Nathalie Lambert	(China) Yang Yang (A)
1995	(China) Wang Chunlu	(Canada) Isabelle Charest	(South Korea) Kim Yun-mi
1996	(Canada) Isabelle Charest	(Canada) Annie Perreault	(Italy) Marinella Canclini
1997	(China) Yang Yang (A)	(Canada) Isabelle Charest	(Italy) Marinella Canclini
1998	(China) Wang Chunlu	(Canada) Annie Perreault	(Italy) Marinella Canclini
1999	(China) Yang Yang (A)	(Bulgaria) Evgenia Radanova	(China) Yang Yang (S)
2000	(Bulgaria) Evgenia Radanova	(China) Yang Yang (S)	(South Korea) An Sang-mi
2001	(China) Wang Chunlu	(China) Yang Yang (A)	(China) Yang Yang (S)
2002	(China) Yang Yang (A)	(Bulgaria) Evgenia Radanova	(China) Wang Chunlu
2003	(China) Yang Yang (A)	(Canada) Amélie Goulet-Nadon	(China) Fu Tianyu
2004	(China) Wang Meng	(Italy) Marta Capurso	(South Korea) Choi Eun-kyung
2005	(China) Yang Yang (A)	(China) Wang Meng	(China) Fu Tianyu
2006	(China) Wang Meng	(China) Fu Tianyu	(Canada) Kalyna Roberge
2007	(Canada) Kalyna Roberge	(Italy) Arianna Fontana	(South Korea) Jung Eun-ju
2008	(China) Wang Meng	(China) Liu Qiuhong	(Canada) Kalyna Roberge
2009	(China) Wang Meng	(China) Liu Qiuhong	(Canada) Jessica Gregg
2010	(China) Wang Meng	(Canada) Kalyna Roberge	(Canada) Marianne St-Gelais
2011	(China) Fan Kexin	(Italy) Arianna Fontana	(China) Liu Qiuhong
2012	(China) Fan Kexin	(Italy) Arianna Fontana	(United States) Lana Gehring
2013	(China) Wang Meng	(South Korea) Park Seung-hi	(China) Fan Kexin
2014	(South Korea) Park Seung-hi	(United Kingdom) Elise Christie	(China) Fan Kexin
2015	(China) Fan Kexin	(United Kingdom) Elise Christie	(Italy) Arianna Fontana
2016	(China) Fan Kexin	(Canada) Marianne St-Gelais	(China) Qu Chunyu
2017	(China) Fan Kexin	(Canada) Marianne St-Gelais	(South Korea) Kim Ji-yoo
2018	(South Korea) Choi Min-jeong	(Poland) Natalia Maliszewska	(China) Qu Chunyu
2019	(Netherlands) Lara van Ruijven	(China) Fan Kexin	(Netherlands) Suzanne Schulting
2021	(Netherlands) Suzanne Schulting	(Italy) Arianna Fontana	(Netherlands) Selma Poutsma
2022	(Netherlands) Xandra Velzeboer	(Canada) Kim Boutin	(Netherlands) Yara van Kerkhof
2023	(Netherlands) Xandra Velzeboer	(Netherlands) Suzanne Schulting	(Netherlands) Selma Poutsma
2024	(Canada) Kim Boutin	(Netherlands) Xandra Velzeboer	(United States) Kristen Santos-Griswold
2025	(Netherlands) Xandra Velzeboer	(Canada) Rikki Doak	(Poland) Natalia Maliszewska
2026	(Netherlands) Xandra Velzeboer	(Netherlands) Selma Poutsma	(Italy) Chiara Betti
2027			

==== 1000 m ====
Year	Gold	Silver	Bronze
1976	(United States) Celeste Chlapaty	(United States) Denise Chlapaty	(Canada) Margaret Hanson
1977	(Canada) Kathy Vogt	(United States) Peggy Hartrich	(Canada) Brenda Webster
1978	(Japan) Miyoshi Kato	(United States) Peggy Hartrich	(United States) Patty Lyman
1979	(Canada) Kathy Turnbull	(Canada) Sylvie Daigle	(Canada) Brenda Webster
1980	(Japan) Mika Kato	(Japan) Miyoshi Kato	(Canada) Kathy Turnbull
1981	(Japan) Miyoshi Kato	(Japan) Mika Kato	(Canada) Nathalie Grondin
1982	(Canada) Maryse Perreault	(Canada) Sylvie Daigle	(Canada) Louise Begin
1983	(Canada) Sylvie Daigle	(United States) Bonnie Blair	(Japan) Mika Kato
1984	(United States) Bonnie Blair	(Canada) Marie Jose Martin	(Canada) Nathalie Lambert
1985	(Japan) Eiko Shishii	(Australia) Karen Gardiner	(United States) Bonnie Blair
1986	(United States) Bonnie Blair	(Canada) Nathalie Lambert	(United States) Tara Laszlo
1987	(Japan) Mariko Kinoshita	(Japan) Eiko Shishii	(Canada) Maryse Perreault
1988			
1989	(Canada) Maryse Perreault	(Canada) Sylvie Daigle	(China) Guo Hongru
1990	(Canada) Sylvie Daigle	(Netherlands) Manuela Ossendrijver	(Netherlands) Joëlle van Koetsveld
1991	(Canada) Sylvie Daigle	(Canada) Nathalie Lambert	(China) Guo Hongru
1992	(China) Li Yan	(Japan) Nobuko Yamada	(Canada) Nathalie Lambert
1993	(Canada) Nathalie Lambert	(China) Li Yan	(United States) Amy Peterson
1994	(Canada) Nathalie Lambert	(South Korea) Kim So-hee	(South Korea) Kim Ryang-hee
1995	(China) Wang Chunlu	(South Korea) Chun Lee-kyung	(South Korea) Kim So-hee
1996	(Italy) Marinella Canclini	(South Korea) Chun Lee-kyung	(Canada) Isabelle Charest
1997	(China) Yang Yang (A)	(South Korea) Won Hye-kyung	(South Korea) Chun Lee-kyung
1998	(China) Yang Yang (A)	(South Korea) Chun Lee-kyung	(South Korea) Kim Yun-mi
1999	(China) Yang Yang (A)	(China) Yang Yang (S)	(South Korea) Kim Moon-jung
2000	(China) Yang Yang (A)	(China) Yang Yang (S)	(South Korea) Joo Min-jin
2001	(China) Yang Yang (A)	(China) Wang Chunlu	(China) Yang Yang (S)
2002	(China) Yang Yang (A)	(South Korea) Ko Gi-hyun	(Bulgaria) Evgenia Radanova
2003	(Bulgaria) Evgenia Radanova	(South Korea) Choi Eun-kyung	(China) Yang Yang (A)
2004	(South Korea) Choi Eun-kyung	(South Korea) Byun Chun-sa	(China) Fu Tianyu
2005	(South Korea) Choi Eun-kyung	(South Korea) Jin Sun-yu	(China) Wang Meng
2006	(South Korea) Jin Sun-yu	(China) Wang Meng	(Canada) Kalyna Roberge
2007	(South Korea) Jin Sun-yu	(South Korea) Jung Eun-ju	(China) Zhou Yang
2008	(China) Wang Meng	(China) Zhou Yang	(Canada) Kalyna Roberge
2009	(China) Wang Meng	(South Korea) Kim Min-jung	(South Korea) Shin Sae-bom
2010	(China) Wang Meng	(South Korea) Cho Ha-ri	(United States) Katherine Reutter
2011	(South Korea) Cho Ha-ri	(Italy) Arianna Fontana	(United States) Katherine Reutter
2012	(South Korea) Cho Ha-ri	(China) Li Jianrou	(Canada) Valérie Maltais
2013	(China) Wang Meng	(Netherlands) Jorien ter Mors	(United Kingdom) Elise Christie
2014	(South Korea) Shim Suk-hee	(South Korea) Park Seung-hi	(Canada) Valérie Maltais
2015	(South Korea) Choi Min-jeong	(United Kingdom) Elise Christie	(Italy) Arianna Fontana
2016	(South Korea) Choi Min-jeong	(United Kingdom) Elise Christie	(Canada) Kasandra Bradette
2017	(United Kingdom) Elise Christie	(Canada) Marianne St-Gelais	(Netherlands) Suzanne Schulting
2018	(South Korea) Shim Suk-hee	(Russia) Sofia Prosvirnova	(China) Li Jinyu
2019	(Netherlands) Suzanne Schulting	(South Korea) Choi Min-jeong	(Canada) Kim Boutin
2021	(Netherlands) Suzanne Schulting	(Belgium) Hanne Desmet	(Canada) Courtney Sarault
2022	(South Korea) Choi Min-jeong	(Canada) Kim Boutin	(Netherlands) Xandra Velzeboer
2023	(Netherlands) Xandra Velzeboer	(South Korea) Choi Min-jeong	(Canada) Courtney Sarault
2024	(United States) Kristen Santos-Griswold	(South Korea) Kim Gil-li	(Italy) Arianna Fontana
2025	(Belgium) Hanne Desmet	(Canada) Courtney Sarault	(Netherlands) Xandra Velzeboer
2026	(South Korea) Kim Gil-li	(Netherlands) Xandra Velzeboer	(Italy) Elisa Confortola
2027			

==== 1500 m ====
Year	Gold	Silver	Bronze
1976	(United States) Celeste Chlapaty	(Canada) Kathy Vogt	(United States) Peggy Hartrich
1977	(Canada) Brenda Webster	(United States) Valerie Reimann	(United States) Vicki Reimann
1978	(United States) Sarah Docter	(Canada) Brenda Webster	(Japan) Miyoshi Kato
1979	(Japan) Miyoshi Kato	(Canada) Kathy Turnbull	(Canada) Sylvie Daigle
1980	(Japan) Miyoshi Kato	(Japan) Mika Kato	(Canada) Kathy Turnbull
1981	(Japan) Miyoshi Kato	(Japan) Mika Kato	(Canada) Louise Begin
1982	(Canada) Maryse Perreault	(Canada) Louise Begin	(Japan) Mika Kato
1983	(Canada) Sylvie Daigle	(Japan) Miyoshi Kato	(Japan) Hiromi Takeuchi
1984	(Japan) Eiko Shishii	(Japan) Mariko Kinoshita	(United States) Lydia Stephans
1985	(United States) Bonnie Blair	(Japan) Eiko Shishii	(Canada) Maryse Perreault
1986	(United States) Bonnie Blair	(Canada) Nathalie Lambert	(United States) Tara Laszlo
1987	(Japan) Eiko Shishii	(Canada) Nathalie Lambert	(Netherlands) Manuela Ossendrijver
1988			
1989	(Canada) Sylvie Daigle	(Netherlands) Joëlle van Koetsveld	(Canada) Maryse Perreault
1990	(Canada) Nathalie Lambert	(Netherlands) Joëlle van Koetsveld	(Canada) Eden Donatelli
1991	(Canada) Nathalie Lambert	(Canada) Sylvie Daigle	(Italy) Maria Rosa Candido
1992	(South Korea) Kim So-hee	(Netherlands) Monique Velzeboer	(United States) Amy Peterson
1993	(Canada) Nathalie Lambert	(South Korea) Chun Lee-kyung	(China) Wang Xiulan
1994	(South Korea) Kim So-hee	(Canada) Nathalie Lambert	(South Korea) Kim Ryang-hee
1995	(South Korea) Chun Lee-kyung	(South Korea) Kim So-hee	(China) Wang Chunlu
1996	(South Korea) Chun Lee-kyung	(South Korea) Won Hye-kyung	(China) Sun Dandan
1997	(South Korea) Chun Lee-kyung	(South Korea) Won Hye-kyung	(China) Yang Yang (S)
1998	(China) Yang Yang (A)	(China) Wang Chunlu	(Bulgaria) Evgenia Radanova
1999	(China) Yang Yang (S)	(China) Yang Yang (A)	(South Korea) Kim Moon-jung
2000	(China) Yang Yang (A)	(South Korea) Park Hye-won	(South Korea) Joo Min-jin
2001	(China) Yang Yang (A)	(Bulgaria) Evgenia Radanova	(Canada) Marie-Ève Drolet
2002	(China) Yang Yang (A)	(South Korea) Ko Gi-hyun	(Canada) Amélie Goulet-Nadon
2003	(South Korea) Choi Eun-kyung	(South Korea) Kim Min-jee	(China) Yang Yang (A)
2004	(South Korea) Choi Eun-kyung	(China) Wang Meng	(Canada) Alanna Kraus
2005	(South Korea) Jin Sun-yu	(South Korea) Kang Yun-mi	(China) Wang Meng
2006	(South Korea) Jin Sun-yu	(China) Wang Meng	(South Korea) Choi Eun-kyung
2007	(South Korea) Jung Eun-ju	(South Korea) Jin Sun-yu	(South Korea) Byun Chun-sa
2008	(China) Wang Meng	(South Korea) Yang Shin-young	(China) Zhou Yang
2009	(South Korea) Kim Min-jung	(China) Zhou Yang	(South Korea) Shin Sae-bom
2010	(South Korea) Park Seung-hi	(South Korea) Lee Eun-byul	(South Korea) Cho Ha-ri
2011	(United States) Katherine Reutter	(South Korea) Park Seung-hi	(South Korea) Cho Ha-ri
2012	(China) Li Jianrou	(China) Liu Qiuhong	(Canada) Marie-Ève Drolet
2013	(South Korea) Park Seung-hi	(South Korea) Shim Suk-hee	(Canada) Marianne St-Gelais
2014	(South Korea) Shim Suk-hee	(South Korea) Kim A-lang	(South Korea) Park Seung-hi
2015	(Italy) Arianna Fontana	(South Korea) Shim Suk-hee	(South Korea) Choi Min-jeong
2016	(Canada) Marianne St-Gelais	(South Korea) Choi Min-jeong	(United Kingdom) Elise Christie
2017	(United Kingdom) Elise Christie	(Canada) Marianne St-Gelais	(South Korea) Shim Suk-hee
2018	(South Korea) Choi Min-jeong	(South Korea) Shim Suk-hee	(Canada) Kim Boutin
2019	(South Korea) Choi Min-jeong	(Canada) Kim Boutin	(Russia) Sofia Prosvirnova
2021	(Netherlands) Suzanne Schulting	(Canada) Courtney Sarault	(Netherlands) Xandra Velzeboer
2022	(South Korea) Choi Min-jeong	(Canada) Kim Boutin	(South Korea) Seo Whi-min
2023	(Netherlands) Suzanne Schulting	(South Korea) Choi Min-jeong	(Canada) Kim Boutin
2024	(South Korea) Kim Gil-li	(United States) Kristen Santos-Griswold	(United States) Corinne Stoddard
2025	(South Korea) Choi Min-jeong	(Canada) Courtney Sarault	(South Korea) Kim Gil-li
2026	(South Korea) Kim Gil-li	(Netherlands) Xandra Velzeboer	(United States) Corinne Stoddard
2027			

==== 3000 m relay ====
Year	Gold	Silver	Bronze
1976	United States	Canada	—N/a
1977	United States	Canada	Japan
1978			
1979			
1980	Italy	Japan	United States
1981	Canada	United States	Great Britain
1982			
1983	Canada	Japan	United States
1984	Canada	Japan	United States
1985	Japan	Canada	Netherlands
1986	Canada	Japan	Netherlands
1987	Canada	Japan	Italy
1988	Canada	Japan	China
1989	Canada	Netherlands	South Korea
1990	Canada	Japan	Netherlands
1991	Canada	Soviet Union	Italy
1992	Canada	Netherlands	United States
1993	Canada	China	South Korea
1994	Canada	China	South Korea
1995	China	South Korea	Canada
1996	Italy	China	United States
1997	Canada	South Korea	Japan
1998	China	South Korea	United States
1999	China	Italy	Bulgaria
2000	China	South Korea	Canada
2001	China	South Korea	Bulgaria
2002	South Korea	China	Canada
2003	China; Wang Chunlu; Fu Tianyu; Yang Yang (A); Wang Meng	Canada; Tania Vicent; Alanna Kraus; Annie Perreault; Amélie Goulet-Nadon	Bulgaria; Anna Krasteva; Daniela Vlaeva; Evgenia Radanova; Marina Georgieva-Nikolova
2004	South Korea; Ko Gi-hyun; Kim Min-jee; Choi Eun-kyung; Byun Chun-sa	China; Cheng Xiaolei; Fu Tianyu; Liu Xiaoying; Wang Meng	Italy; Mara Zini; Katia Zini; Catia Borrello; Marta Capurso
2005	Canada; Alanna Kraus; Chantale Sévigny; Kalyna Roberge; Tania Vicent; Amanda Overland	China; Cheng Xiaolei; Fu Tianyu; Wang Meng; Yang Yang	France; Stéphanie Bouvier; Choi Min-kyung; Myrtille Gollin; Celine Lecompere
2006	China; Cheng Xiaolei; Fu Tianyu; Wang Meng; Zhu Milei; Wang Wei	Canada; Alanna Kraus; Amanda Overland; Kalyna Roberge; Tania Vicent; Anouk Leblanc-Boucher	Italy; Marta Capurso; Arianna Fontana; Katia Zini; Mara Zini; Cecilia Maffei
2007	South Korea; Byun Chun-sa; Jeon Ji-soo; Jin Sun-yu; Jung Eun-ju; Kim Min-jung	China; Cheng Xiaolei; Fu Tianyu; Zhou Yang; Zhu Milei; Meng Xiaoxue	Canada; Anne Maltais; Amanda Overland; Annik Plamondon; Kalyna Roberge; Nita Avrith
2008	South Korea; Jung Eun-ju; Kim Min-jung; Park Seung-hi; Yang Shin-young; Shin Sae-bom	Canada; Jessica Gregg; Anne Maltais; Amanda Overland; Tania Vicent; Kalyna Roberge	China; Fu Tianyu; Liu Qiuhong; Wang Meng; Zhou Yang; Meng Xiaoxue
2009	China; Liu Qiuhong; Wang Meng; Zhang Hui; Zhou Yang; Fu Tianyu	South Korea; Jung Ba-ra; Kim Min-jung; Shin Sae-bom; Yang Shin-young; Jung Eun-ju	Canada; Jessica Gregg; Jessica Hewitt; Valérie Maltais; Kalyna Roberge; Anne Maltais
2010	South Korea; Cho Ha-ri; Kim Min-jung; Lee Eun-byul; Park Seung-hi; Choi Jung-won	Canada; Jessica Gregg; Kalyna Roberge; Marianne St-Gelais; Tania Vicent; Valérie Maltais	United States; Kimberly Derrick; Alyson Dudek; Lana Gehring; Katherine Reutter
2011	China; Fan Kexin; Li Jianrou; Liu Qiuhong; Zhang Hui; Xiao Han	Netherlands; Jorien ter Mors; Annita van Doorn; Sanne van Kerkhof; Yara van Kerkhof	Canada; Marie-Ève Drolet; Jessica Hewitt; Valérie Maltais; Marianne St-Gelais
2012	China; Liu Qiuhong; Kong Xue; Fan Kexin; Li Jianrou; Xiao Han	United States; Lana Gehring; Jessica Smith; Emily Scott; Tamara Frederick	South Korea; Cho Ha-ri; Choi Jung-won; Son Soo-min; Lee Eun-byul; Kim Dam-min
2013	China; Wang Meng; Fan Kexin; Zhou Yang; Liu Qiuhong; Li Jianrou	Canada; Marianne St-Gelais; Valérie Maltais; Jessica Hewitt; Marie-Ève Drolet	Japan; Biba Sakurai; Ayuko Ito; Sayuri Shimizu; Yui Sakai
2014	China; Fan Kexin; Han Yutong; Kong Xue; Liu Qiuhong	Canada; Marianne St-Gelais; Jessica Gregg; Jessica Hewitt; Valérie Maltais; Marie-Ève Drolet	Italy; Arianna Fontana; Cecilia Maffei; Lucia Peretti; Elena Viviani
2015	South Korea; Noh Do-hee; Shim Suk-hee; Kim A-lang; Choi Min-jeong; Jeon Ji-soo	China; Fan Kexin; Han Yutong; Lin Yue; Tao Jiaying; Zhou Yang	Italy; Arianna Fontana; Lucia Peretti; Elena Viviani; Arianna Valcepina
2016	South Korea; Noh Do-hee; Shim Suk-hee; Choi Min-jeong; Lee Eun-byul; Kim A-lang	Canada; Marianne St-Gelais; Valérie Maltais; Audrey Phaneuf; Kasandra Bradette; Namasthée Harris-Gauthier	Russia; Sofia Prosvirnova; Ekaterina Efremenkova; Emina Malagich; Evgeniya Zakharova
2017	China; Fan Kexin; Guo Yihan; Lin Yue; Zang Yize; Qu Chunyu	Hungary; Bernadett Heidum; Andrea Keszler; Sára Bácskai; Petra Jászapáti	Japan; Ayuko Ito; Hitomi Saito; Sumire Kikuchi; Aoi Watanabe; Moemi Kikuchi
2018	South Korea; Choi Min-jeong; Kim A-lang; Kim Ye-jin; Shim Suk-hee; Lee Yu-bin	Netherlands; Suzanne Schulting; Yara van Kerkhof; Lara van Ruijven; Rianne de Vries	Canada; Kim Boutin; Kasandra Bradette; Valérie Maltais; Marianne St-Gelais; Jamie Macdonald
2019	South Korea; Choi Min-jeong; Kim Geon-hee; Kim Ji-yoo; Shim Suk-hee; Choi Ji-hyun	Russia; Ekaterina Efremenkova; Ekaterina Konstantinova; Emina Malagich; Sofia Prosvirnova	Canada; Kim Boutin; Camille de Serres-Rainville; Alyson Charles; Courtney Sarault; Kasandra Bradette
2021	Netherlands; Selma Poutsma; Suzanne Schulting; Yara van Kerkhof; Xandra Velzeboer; Rianne de Vries	France; Gwendoline Daudet; Tifany Huot-Marchand; Aurélie Lévêque; Aurélie Monvoisin	Italy; Arianna Fontana; Cynthia Mascitto; Arianna Sighel; Martina Valcepina; Arianna Valcepina
2022	South Korea; Choi Min-jeong; Kim A-lang; Seo Whi-min; Shim Suk-hee; Park Ji-yun	Canada; Kim Boutin; Florence Brunelle; Alyson Charles; Courtney Sarault; Danaé Blais	Netherlands; Rianne De Vries; Selma Poutsma; Yara van Kerkhof; Xandra Velzeboer
2023	Netherlands; Selma Poutsma; Suzanne Schulting; Yara van Kerkhof; Xandra Velzeboer; Michelle Velzeboer	South Korea; Choi Min-jeong; Kim Geon-hee; Kim Gil-li; Shim Suk-hee; Lee So-youn	Canada; Kim Boutin; Claudia Gagnon; Courtney Sarault; Renée Steenge; Rikki Doak
2024	Netherlands; Selma Poutsma; Yara van Kerkhof; Michelle Velzeboer; Xandra Velzeboer; Suzanne Schulting	United States; Eunice Lee; Julie Letai; Kristen Santos-Griswold; Corinne Stoddard	Canada; Danaé Blais; Kim Boutin; Rikki Doak; Renée Steenge; Courtney Sarault
2025	Canada; Kim Boutin; Florence Brunelle; Rikki Doak; Courtney Sarault	Poland; Natalia Maliszewska; Nikola Mazur; Kamila Stormowska; Gabriela Topolska	Netherlands; Zoë Deltrap; Diede van Oorschot; Michelle Velzeboer; Xandra Velzeboer
2026	Netherlands; Zoë Deltrap; Michelle Velzeboer; Xandra Velzeboer; Selma Poutsma; Diede van Oorschot	Italy; Elisa Confortola; Arianna Sighel; Chiara Betti; Gloria Ioriatti; Margherita Betti	China; Wang Xinran; Gong Li; Zhang Chutong; Wang Ye; Yang Jinru
2027			

=== Mixed ===
==== 2000 m relay ====
Year	Gold	Silver	Bronze
2023	Netherlands; Teun Boer; Suzanne Schulting; Jens van 't Wout; Xandra Velzeboer; Itzhak de Laat; Selma Poutsma	China; Gong Li; Li Wenlong; Lin Xiaojun; Zang Yize; Wang Xinran; Zhong Yuchen	Italy; Andrea Cassinelli; Arianna Sighel; Pietro Sighel; Arianna Valcepina; Chiara Betti
2024	China; Fan Kexin; Gong Li; Lin Xiaojun; Liu Shaoang; Sun Long; Wang Ye	Italy; Chiara Betti; Andrea Cassinelli; Arianna Sighel; Pietro Sighel; Gloria Ioriatti	United States; Andrew Heo; Marcus Howard; Kristen Santos-Griswold; Corinne Stoddard
2025	Canada; Kim Boutin; Florence Brunelle; William Dandjinou; Steven Dubois; Danaé Blais; Félix Roussel	Italy; Chiara Betti; Gloria Ioriatti; Thomas Nadalini; Pietro Sighel; Elisa Confortola; Luca Spechenhauser	Poland; Natalia Maliszewska; Michal Niewinski; Diane Sellier; Kamila Stormowska; Łukasz Kuczyński
2026	Italy; Elisa Confortola; Pietro Sighel; Chiara Betti; Thomas Nadalini; Luca Spechenhauser; Arianna Sighel	Canada; Florence Brunelle; Danaé Blais; William Dandjinou; Steven Dubois; Courtney Sarault; Félix Roussel	Belgium; Stijn Desmet; Hanne Desmet; Ward Pétré; Tineke den Dulk; Adriaan Dewagtere
2027			

== See also ==
- World Short Track Speed Skating Team Championships
- World Junior Short Track Speed Skating Championships
