= Short-track speed skating at the 1994 Winter Olympics – Women's 1000 metres =

Women's 1000 metres at the XVII Olympic Winter Games
- Pictogram for short track
- Venue: Hamar Olympic Amphitheatre
- Dates: 26 February 1994
- Competitors: 30 from 15 nations
- Winning time: 1:36.87

Medalists
1st place, gold medalist(s)		Chun Lee-kyung	South Korea
2nd place, silver medalist(s)		Nathalie Lambert	Canada
3rd place, bronze medalist(s)		Kim So-hee	South Korea

The Women's 1000 metres in short track speed skating at the 1994 Winter Olympics took place on 26 February at the Hamar Olympic Amphitheatre.

== Results ==
=== Heats ===
The first round was held on 26 February. There were eight heats, with the top two finishers moving on to the quarterfinals.

Heat 1

Rank	Athlete	Country	Time	Notes
1	Sylvie Daigle	Canada	1:41.88	Q
2	Sandrine Daudet	France	1:41.91	Q
3	Evgeniya Radanova	Bulgaria	1:45.67	
4	Viktoriya Troitskaya-Taranina	Russia	1:59.84	

Heat 2

Rank	Athlete	Country	Time	Notes
1	Isabelle Charest	Canada	1:39.55	Q OR
2	Zhang Yanmei	China	1:39.72	Q
3	Katia Mosconi	Italy	1:41.51	
–	Yelena Sinitsina	Kazakhstan	DQ	

Heat 3

Rank	Athlete	Country	Time	Notes
1	Kim So-hee	South Korea	1:43.76	Q
2	Amy Peterson	United States	1:45.38	Q
3	Katia Colturi	Italy	1:46.89	
4	Penèlope di Lella	Netherlands	1:47.54	

Heat 4

Rank	Athlete	Country	Time	Notes
1	Marina Pylayeva	Russia	1:44.38	Q
2	Yang Yang (S)	China	1:46.53	Q
3	Cindy Meyer	South Africa	1:47.85	
4	Anke Jannie Landman	Netherlands	1:58.09	

Heat 5

Rank	Athlete	Country	Time	Notes
1	Ayako Tsubaki	Japan	1:39.61	Q
2	Marinella Canclini	Italy	1:39.74	Q
3	Sofie Pintens	Belgium	1:41.12	
4	Laure Drouet	France	1:41.21	

Heat 6

Rank	Athlete	Country	Time	Notes
1	Karen Gardiner-Kah	Australia	1:41.64	Q
2	Cathy Turner	United States	1:47.03	Q
3	Yelena Tikhanina	Russia	1:53.92	

Heat 7

Rank	Athlete	Country	Time	Notes
1	Won Hye-kyung	South Korea	1:42.75	Q
2	Wang Xiulan	China	1:43.71	Q
3	Debbie Palmer	Great Britain	1:44.72	
4	Valérie Barizza	France	1:52.30	

Heat 8

Rank	Athlete	Country	Time	Notes
1	Nathalie Lambert	Canada	1:40.45	Q
2	Chun Lee-kyung	South Korea	1:40.49	Q
3	Bea Pintens	Belgium	1:43.16	

=== Quarterfinals ===
The quarterfinals were held on 26 February. The top two finishers in each of the four quarterfinals advanced to the semifinals.

Quarterfinal 1

Rank	Athlete	Country	Time	Notes
1	Nathalie Lambert	Canada	1:38.75	Q
2	Yang Yang (S)	China	1:38.96	Q
3	Won Hye-kyung	South Korea	1:39.03	
4	Marinella Canclini	Italy	1:39.20	

Quarterfinal 2

Rank	Athlete	Country	Time	Notes
1	Isabelle Charest	Canada	1:40.29	Q
2	Chun Lee-kyung	South Korea	1:40.30	Q
3	Wang Xiulan	China	1:40.58	
4	Marina Pylayeva	Russia	1:42.15	

Quarterfinal 3

Rank	Athlete	Country	Time	Notes
1	Kim So-hee	South Korea	1:38.61	Q OR
2	Cathy Turner	United States	1:38.98	Q
3	Ayako Tsubaki	Japan	1:39.12	
4	Sandrine Daudet	France	1:40.83	

Quarterfinal 4

Rank	Athlete	Country	Time	Notes
1	Sylvie Daigle	Canada	1:38.82	Q
2	Zhang Yanmei	China	1:39.02	Q
3	Amy Peterson	United States	1:39.51	
4	Karen Gardiner-Kah	Australia	1:39.93	

=== Semifinals ===
The semifinals were held on 26 February. The top two finishers in each of the two semifinals qualified for the A final, while the third and fourth place skaters advanced to the B Final. In semifinal 2, China's Yang Yang (S) was advanced to the final, and Canada's Sylvie Daigle was disqualified.

Semifinal 1

Rank	Athlete	Country	Time	Notes
1	Kim So-hee	South Korea	1:37.17	QA OR
2	Zhang Yanmei	China	1:37.26	QA
3	Isabelle Charest	Canada	1:37.89	QB
–	Cathy Turner	United States	DQ	

Semifinal 2

Rank	Athlete	Country	Time	Notes
1	Nathalie Lambert	Canada	1:38.82	QA
2	Chun Lee-kyung	South Korea	1:55.07	QA
3	Yang Yang (S)	China	2:12.06	QB
–	Sylvie Daigle	Canada	DQ	

=== Finals ===
The five qualifying skaters competed in Final A, while Canada's Isabelle Charest raced alone for 5th place in Final B.

Final A

Rank	Athlete	Country	Time	Notes
1st place, gold medalist(s)	Chun Lee-kyung	South Korea	1:36.87	OR
2nd place, silver medalist(s)	Nathalie Lambert	Canada	1:36.97	
3rd place, bronze medalist(s)	Kim So-hee	South Korea	1:37.09	
4	Zhang Yanmei	China	1:37.80	
5	Yang Yang (S)	China	1:47.10	

Final B

Rank	Athlete	Country	Time	Notes
6	Isabelle Charest	Canada	1:37.49	
