= 1994 World Short Track Speed Skating Championships =

The 1994 World Short Track Speed Skating Championships took place between March 31 and April 2, 1994, in Guildford, United Kingdom.

== Participating nations ==
1. Australia (5)
2. Austria (10)
3. Belgium (6)
4. Bulgaria (4)
5. Canada (10)
6. China (6)
7. France (8)
8. Germany (7)
9. Great Britain (7)
10. Hungary (9)
11. Italy (10)
12. Japan (10)
13. Kazakhstan (3)
14. Mongolia (1)
15. Netherlands (9)
16. New Zealand (2)
17. Norway (5)
18. Russia (9)
19. South Africa (1)
20. South Korea (10)
21. Sweden (4)
22. Switzerland (2)
23. Ukraine (6)
24. United States (7)

== Results ==
=== Men ===
Event	Gold		Silver		Bronze	
Overall	Marc Gagnon; Canada	10 points	Frederic Blackburn; Canada	9 points	Chae Ji-hoon; South Korea	9 points
500 m	Frédéric Blackburn; Canada	44.07	Derrick Campbell; Canada	44.10	Kim Ki-hoon; South Korea	44.24
1000 m	Marc Gagnon; Canada	1:33.08	Frederic Blackburn; Canada	1:33.08	Derrick Campbell; Canada	1:33.13
1500 m	Chae Ji-hoon; South Korea	2:26.45	Marc Gagnon; Canada	2:27.15	Derrick Campbell; Canada	2:27.55
3000 m	Orazio Fagone; Italy	5:55.56	Chae Ji-hoon; South Korea	5:55.58	Marc Gagnon; Canada	5:55.77
5000 m relay	Japan; Hideto Imai; Yuichi Akasaka; Satoru Terao; Tatsuyoshi Ishihara	7:20.11	Australia; Steven Bradbury; Andrew Murtha; Richard Nizielski; Kieran Hansen	7:22.57	Canada; Stephen Gough; Frédéric Blackburn; Denis Mouraux; Derrick Campbell; Marc Gagnon	7:31.06

=== Women ===
Event	Gold		Silver		Bronze	
Overall	Nathalie Lambert; Canada	16 points	Kim So-hee; South Korea	8 points	Kim Ryang-hee; South Korea	7 points
500 m	Marinella Canclini; Italy	47.09	Nathalie Lambert; Canada	47.43	Yang Yang (A); China	48.16
1000 m	Nathalie Lambert; Canada	1:45.46	Kim So-hee; South Korea	1:45.54	Kim Ryang-hee; South Korea	1:45.56
1500 m	Kim So-hee; South Korea	2:43.03	Nathalie Lambert; Canada	2:43.12	Kim Ryang-hee; South Korea	2:43.14
3000 m	Nathalie Lambert; Canada	6:23.21	Kim Ryang-hee; South Korea	6:23.23	Yang Yang (A); China	6:24.46
3000 m relay	Canada; Christine Boudrias; Sylvie Daigle; Isabelle Charest; Angela Cutrone; Nathalie Lambert	4:30.89	China; Su Xiaohua; Wang Xiulan; Yang Yang (A); Zhang Yanmei; Zhang Jing	4:31.16	South Korea; Kim Yun-mi; Chun Lee-kyung; Kim So-hee; Won Hye-kyung	4:31.28

== Medal table ==
Rank	Nation	Gold	Silver	Bronze	Total
1	Canada (CAN)	7	6	4	17
2	South Korea (KOR)	2	4	6	12
3	Italy (ITA)	2	0	0	2
4	Japan (JPN)	1	0	0	1
5	China (CHN)	0	1	2	3
6	Australia (AUS)	0	1	0	1
Totals (6 entries)		12	12	12	36
