= 1997 World Short Track Speed Skating Championships =

The 1997 World Short Track Speed Skating Championships took place between March 29 and 30, 1997, in Nagano, Japan, one year before the 1998 Winter Olympics. The event was hosted in White Ring.

== Results ==
=== Men ===
Event	Gold		Silver		Bronze	
Overall	Kim Dong-sung; South Korea		Marc Gagnon; Canada		Satoru Terao; Japan; Derrick Campbell; Canada	
500 m	Derrick Campbell; Canada	43.424	Kim Dong-sung; South Korea	43.557	Satoru Terao; Japan	43.697
1000 m	Kim Dong-sung; South Korea	1:35.187	Lee Jun-hwan; South Korea	1:35.303	Feng Kai; China	1:50.706
1500 m	Marc Gagnon; Canada	2:21.322	Orazio Fagone; Italy	2:21.617	Mirko Vuillermin; Italy	2:22.063
3000 m	Kim Dong-sung; South Korea	5:14.057	Satoru Terao; Japan	5:14.353	Marc Gagnon; Canada	5:14.484
5000 m relay	South Korea; Kim Dong-sung; Lee Ho-eung; Kim Sun-tae; Lee Jun-hwan	7:00.042	Canada; Jonathan Guilmette; Derrick Campbell; Marc Gagnon; Éric Bédard; François Drolet	7:07.206	Italy; Orazio Fagone; Nicola Franceschina; Mirko Vuillermin; Fabio Carta; Michele Antonioli	7:09.028

=== Women ===
Event	Gold		Silver		Bronze	
Overall	Chun Lee-kyung; South Korea; Yang Yang (A); China				Won Hye-kyung; South Korea	
500 m	Yang Yang (A); China	45.946	Isabelle Charest; Canada	52.050	Marinella Canclini; Italy	54.374
1000 m	Yang Yang (A); China	1:35.394	Won Hye-kyung; South Korea	1:35.461	Chun Lee-kyung; South Korea	1:35.463
1500 m	Chun Lee-kyung; South Korea	2:29.426	Won Hye-kyung; South Korea	2:29.554	Yang Yang (S); China	2:30.467
3000 m	Chun Lee-kyung; South Korea	5:44.161	Won Hye-kyung; South Korea	5:44.261	Yang Yang (A); China	5:44.358
3000 m relay	Canada; Nathalie Lambert; Isabelle Charest; Christine Boudrias; Annie Perreault	4:21.232	South Korea; Won Hye-kyung; Chun Lee-kyung; An Sang-mi; Kim Yoon-mi	4:21.362	Japan; Ayako Tsubaki; Ikue Teshigawara; Chikage Tanaka; Nobuko Yamada	4:21.606

== Medal table ==
Rank	Nation	Gold	Silver	Bronze	Total
1	South Korea (KOR)	7	6	2	15
2	Canada (CAN)	3	3	2	8
3	China (CHN)	3	0	3	6
4	Italy (ITA)	0	1	3	4
4	Japan (JPN)	0	1	3	4
Totals (5 entries)		13	11	13	37
