= 1992 World Short Track Speed Skating Championships =

The 1992 World Short Track Speed Skating Championships took place between April 2 and 4, 1992, in Denver, United States.

== Participating nations ==
1. Australia (6)
2. Austria (1)
3. Belgium (10)
4. Bulgaria (1)
5. Canada (10)
6. China (6)
7. CIS (4)
8. France (10)
9. Germany (9)
10. Great Britain (5)
11. Hungary (1)
12. Italy (9)
13. Japan (10)
14. Netherlands (10)
15. New Zealand (2)
16. North Korea (1)
17. Norway (4)
18. Romania (1)
19. South Africa (3)
20. South Korea (10)
21. Sweden (1)
22. Switzerland (1)
23. United States (10)

== Results ==
=== Men ===
Event	Gold		Silver		Bronze	
Overall	Kim Ki-hoon; South Korea	20	Mo Ji-soo; South Korea	6	Lee Joon-ho; South Korea	4
500 m	Kim Ki-hoon; South Korea	43.86	Wilf O'Reilly; Great Britain	44.07	Lee Joon-ho; South Korea	44.19
1000 m	Kim Ki-hoon; South Korea	1:37.26	Michael McMillen; New Zealand	1:37.73	Lee Joon-ho; South Korea	1:54.59
1500 m	Kim Ki-hoon; South Korea	2:27.03	Mo Ji-soo; South Korea	2:27.21	Tatsuyoshi Ishihara; Japan	2:27.73
3000 m	Kim Ki-hoon; South Korea	5:05.90	Mo Ji-soo; South Korea	5:06.04	Frédéric Blackburn; Canada	5:06.09
5000 m relay	Japan; Toshinobu Kawai; Yuichi Akasaka; Tatsuyoshi Ishihara; Tsutomu Kawasaki; Jun Uematsu	7:20.57	Great Britain; Wilf O'Reilly; Nicky Gooch; Matthew Jasper; Jamie Fearn	7:23.01	France; Claude Nicouleau; Marc Bella; Rémi Ingres; Arnaud Drouet	7:25.33

=== Women ===
Event	Gold		Silver		Bronze	
Overall	Kim So-hee; South Korea	13	Li Yan; China	10	Nobuko Yamada; Japan	5
500 m	Li Yan; China	47.23	Kim So-hee; South Korea	48.95	Zhen Chunyang; China	1:16.01
1000 m	Li Yan; China	1:46.83	Nobuko Yamada; Japan	1:51.84	Nathalie Lambert; Canada	1:57.37
1500 m	Kim So-hee; South Korea	2:44.24	Monique Velzeboer; Netherlands	2:44.42	Amy Peterson; United States	2:44.66
3000 m	Kim So-hee; South Korea	5:26.71	Kim Yang-hee; South Korea	5:29.59	Nobuko Yamada; Japan	5:29.62
3000 m relay	Canada; Sylvie Daigle; Eden Donatelli; Nathalie Lambert; Angela Cutrone; Annie Perreault	4:35.74	Netherlands; Monique Velzeboer; Simone Velzeboer; Penèlope di Lella; Joëlle van Koetsveld	4:42.02	United States; Valérie Barizza; Gaëlle Deléglise; Sandrine Daudet; Karine Rubini; Laure Drouet	4:43.16

== Medal table ==
* Host nation (United States)

Rank	Nation	Gold	Silver	Bronze	Total
1	South Korea (KOR)	8	5	3	16
2	China (CHN)	2	1	1	4
3	Japan (JPN)	1	1	3	5
4	Canada (CAN)	1	0	2	3
5	Great Britain (GBR)	0	2	0	2
5	Netherlands (NED)	0	2	0	2
7	New Zealand (NZL)	0	1	0	1
8	France (FRA)	0	0	2	2
9	United States (USA)*	0	0	1	1
Totals (9 entries)		12	12	12	36
