= Speed Skating Canada =

Body overseeing speed skating in Canada

- Sport: Speed skating
- Jurisdiction: Canada
- Abbreviation: SSC
- Founded: 1887
- Affiliation: International Skating Union
- Affiliation date: 1894
- Headquarters: Ottawa, Ontario
- President: Ron Weiser
- CEO: Joe Morissette

Official website
- www.speedskating.ca
- (Canada)

Speed Skating Canada (SSC) is the governing body for competitive long track and short track speed skating in Canada. It was founded in 1887, five years before the International Skating Union of which SSC later became a member in 1894.

== History ==
In 1854, three British army officers raced on the St. Lawrence River, going from Montreal to Quebec City, which marked Canada's first recorded ice skating race. It is believed that from then on, ice skating races became a part of Canadian culture.

In 1887, the Amateur Skating Association of Canada was formed. That year, the first official speed skating championships took place. At that time, figure skating and speed skating shared an organization, however the needs of the speed skaters were predominant. In 1894, the Amateur Skating Association of Canada became the first non-European organization to be a member of the International Skating Union.

In 1905, short track speed skating was created and gaining popularity in Canada and the United States.

In 1939, the figure skaters formed their own organization and thus the Amateur Skating Association of Canada was made up of speed skaters only. Now that it was a speed skating only organization, the name was changed to the Canadian Amateur Speed Skating Association (or CASSA) in 1960.

It was not until 2000 that CASSA changed their name, yet again, to Speed Skating Canada.

== Structure ==
The organization is governed by the Board of Directors which is elected by the members. It is composed of the President, the Athletes Director, the Treasurer, and five Directors at Large.

=== Branches ===
Speed Skating Canada is split up into thirteen branches, each representing a Canadian province or territory, as follows:

- Alberta Amateur Speed Skating Association
- British Columbia Speed Skating Association
- Manitoba Speed Skating Association
- Newfoundland & Labrador Speed Skating Association
- Nunavut Speed Skating Association
- NWT Amateur Speed Skating Association
- Ontario Speed Skating Association
- Quebec Speed Skating Federation
- Saskatchewan Amateur Speed Skating Association
- Speed Skate New-Brunswick
- Speed Skate Nova Scotia
- Speed Skate PEI
- Yukon Amateur Speed Skating Association

=== Hall of Fame ===
The Speed Skating Canada Hall of Fame recognizes the following athletes and contributors to the sport:

==== Builders ====
- Jack Barber (1968)
- Clarence Downey (1968)
- Patricia Underhill (1972)
- Harold P. Costin (1973)
- Arthur W. Panting (1980)
- William E. Roughton (1980)
- Harry Cody (1983)
- Donald McCannell (1983)
- Carl Hennigar (1985)
- Bob Hodges (1985)
- Louis Rubenstein (1986)
- Wally Boschuk (1987)
- Bruno Comis (1987)
- John Hurdis (1987)
- René Marleau (1987)
- Leonard B. Morris (1987)
- Clara Overend (1987)
- Howard Overend (1987)
- Jack Walters (1987)
- Ken West (1987)
- Eugene Hearn (1988)
- Jean Grenier (1991)
- Marcel Laberge (1991)
- Robert Planert (1991)
- Michel Verrault (1991)
- Harold Augustine (1992)
- Howard Comfort (1992)
- Henrietta Goplen (1992)
- Peter Williamson (1992)
- Jack Jayner (1993)
- Yves Nadeau (1993)
- Iris Fletcher (1994)
- André Lamothe (1995)
- Elsie Barlow (1996)
- Bob Boucher (1996)
- Pierre Gagné (1996)
- Brian Thususka (1996)
- Doug Gordon (1997)
- Guy Marcoux (1997)
- Ron Thompson (1997)
- Ottavio Cinquanta (2000)
- William Dyer (2000)
- Jacques Thibault (2004)
- Debbie Fisher (2005)
- Ernie Overland (2016)
- Pat Leech (2019)
- David Gilday (2020)
- Marcel Lacroix (2021)

==== Long track ====
- Charles I. Gorman (1965)
- Jack McCullough (1965)
- Betty Mitchell (1965)
- Lot Roe (1965)
- Frank Stack (1965)
- Gordon Audley (1966)
- Percy Johnston (1966)
- Fred Robson (1970)
- Lela Brooks (1972)
- Ross Robinson (1975)
- Doreen Ryan (1975)
- Craig MacKay (1976)
- Alex Hurd (1978)
- Fred Logan (1978)
- William Logan (1978)
- Doreen McCannell (1978)
- Phyllis Fitzgerald (1980)
- Maurice Gagné (1980)
- Ralf Olin (1980)
- Sylvia Burka-Lovell (1981)
- Cathy Priestner (1982)
- John Sands (1983)
- Gaétan Boucher (1984)
- Kevin Sirois (1992)
- Liz Appleby (1993)
- Susan Auch (1994)
- Cathy Turnbull Spence (1994)
- Gerry Cassan (1995)
- Kevin Scott (1995)
- Sylvain Bouchard (1997)
- Jean Pichette (1997)
- Catriona Le May Doan (1998)
- Kevin Overland (1998)
- Jeremy Wotherspoon (1998)
- Steven Elm (1999)
- Ariane Loignon (1999)
- Philippe Marois (2000)
- Neal Marshall (2001)
- Clara Hughes (2004)
- Mike Ireland (2005)
- Cindy Klassen (2005)
- Shannon Rempel (2005)
- Justin Warsylewicz (2005)
- Kristina Groves (2006)
- Christine Nesbitt (2017)
- Jean Wilson (2020)
- Wilfrid Mathieu (2021)

==== Short track ====
- Sylvie Daigle (1987)
- Guy Daignault (1987)
- Benoit Baril (1990)
- Michel Daignault (1990)
- Louis Grenier (1990)
- Maryse Perreault (1990)
- Brenda Webster (1990)
- Nathalie Lambert (1991)
- Frédéric Blackburn (1992)
- Marc Gagnon (1993)
- Mark Lackie (1993)
- Michael Murray (1993)
- Eden Donatelli Green (1994)
- Shelley Rhead Skarvan (1994)
- Isabelle Charest (1997)
- Éric Bédard (1998)
- Annie Perreault (1998)
- Jean-François Monette (1999)
- François-Louis Tremblay (1999)
- Marie-Ève Drolet (2000)
- Andrew Quinn (2000)
- Steve Robillard (2000)
- Jeff Scholten (2000)
- Jonathan Guilmette (2005)
- Mathieu Turcotte (2005)
- Anouk Leblanc-Boucher (2006)
- Tania Vicent (2018)
