= 1998 World Short Track Speed Skating Championships =

The 1998 World Short Track Speed Skating Championships took place between March 20 and 22, 1998, in Vienna, Austria. The event was hosted by Steffl Arena.

== Results ==
=== Men ===
Event	Gold		Silver		Bronze	
Overall	Marc Gagnon; Canada		Fabio Carta; Italy		Kim Dong-sung; South Korea	
500 m	Feng Kai; China	42.458	Éric Bédard; Canada	42.675	Yuan Ye; China	42.724
1000 m	Marc Gagnon; Canada	1:34.117	Satoru Terao; Japan	1:34.123	Fabio Carta; Italy	1:34.193
1500 m	Marc Gagnon; Canada	2:16.929	Fabio Carta; Italy	2:17.046	Kim Dong-sung; South Korea	2:17.341
3000 m	Kim Dong-sung; South Korea	5:15.007	Michele Antonioli; Italy	5:18.609	Fabio Carta; Italy	5:21.546
5000 m relay	Canada; Derrick Campbell; Mathieu Turcotte; Marc Gagnon; François Drolet; Éric Bédard	7:01.557	South Korea; Kim Dong-sung; Chae Ji-hoon; Lee Jun-hwan; Lee Ho-eung; Kim Sun-tae	7:01.738	China; Li Jiajun; Feng Kai; Yuan Ye; An Yulong	7:02.455

=== Women ===
Event	Gold		Silver		Bronze	
Overall	Yang Yang (A); China		Wang Chunlu; China; Chun Lee-kyung; South Korea			
500 m	Wang Chunlu; China	45.087	Annie Perreault; Canada	45.180	Marinella Canclini; Italy	45.266
1000 m	Yang Yang (A); China	1:33.562	Chun Lee-kyung; South Korea	1:33.584	Kim Yun-mi; South Korea	1:34.198
1500 m	Yang Yang (A); China	2:26.063	Wang Chunlu; China	2:26.347	Evgenia Radanova; Bulgaria	2:26.501
3000 m	Chun Lee-kyung; South Korea	5:19.340	Yang Yang (A); China	5:20.057	Evgenia Radanova; Bulgaria	5:20.387
3000 m relay	China; Wang Chunlu; Yang Yang (A); Yang Yang (S); Sun Dandan; Qin Na	4:21.122	South Korea; Won Hye-kyung; Chun Lee-kyung; Kim Yun-mi; An Sang-mi	4:23.135	United States; Sarah Lang; Caroline Hallisey; Amy Peterson; Erin Porter	4:28.251

== Medal table ==
Rank	Nation	Gold	Silver	Bronze	Total
1	China (CHN)	5	2	2	9
2	Canada (CAN)	3	2	0	5
3	South Korea (KOR)	2	3	2	7
4	Italy (ITA)	0	2	3	5
5	Japan (JPN)	0	1	0	1
6	Bulgaria (BUL)	0	0	2	2
7	United States (USA)	0	0	1	1
Totals (7 entries)		10	10	10	30
