= Short-track speed skating at the 1994 Winter Olympics – Men's 500 metres =

Men's 500 metres at the XVII Olympic Winter Games
- Pictogram for short track
- Venue: Hamar Olympic Amphitheatre
- Dates: 24–26 February 1994
- Competitors: 31 from 16 nations
- Winning time: 43.45

Medalists
1st place, gold medalist(s)		Chae Ji-hoon	South Korea
2nd place, silver medalist(s)		Mirko Vuillermin	Italy
3rd place, bronze medalist(s)		Nicky Gooch	Great Britain

The men's 500 metres in short track speed skating at the 1994 Winter Olympics took place on 24 and 26 February at the Hamar Olympic Amphitheatre.

== Results ==
=== Heats ===
The first round was held on 24 February. There were eight heats, with the top two finishers moving on to the quarterfinals.

Heat 1

Rank	Athlete	Country	Time	Notes
1	Richard Nizielski	Australia	44.86	Q
2	Martin Johansson	Sweden	44.94	Q
3	John Coyle	United States	45.42	
4	Li Lianli	China	63.44	

Heat 2

Rank	Athlete	Country	Time	Notes
1	Marc Gagnon	Canada	44.69	Q
2	Steven Bradbury	Australia	45.43	Q
3	Erik Duyvelshoff	Netherlands	45.83	
4	Wilf O'Reilly	Great Britain	46.41	

Heat 3

Rank	Athlete	Country	Time	Notes
1	Derrick Campbell	Canada	44.72	Q
2	Lee Joon-ho	South Korea	45.41	Q
3	Bruno Loscos	France	45.54	

Heat 4

Rank	Athlete	Country	Time	Notes
1	Chae Ji-hoon	South Korea	44.36	Q
2	Jun Uematsu	Japan	44.50	Q
3	Batchuluuny Bat–Orgil	Mongolia	48.63	
–	Orazio Fagone	Italy	DQ	

Heat 5

Rank	Athlete	Country	Time	Notes
1	Li Jiajun	China	44.67	Q
2	Kim Ki-hoon	South Korea	45.32	Q
3	Igor Ozerov	Russia	45.48	
4	Andrew Nicholson	New Zealand	54.21	

Heat 6

Rank	Athlete	Country	Time	Notes
1	Mirko Vuillermin	Italy	44.29	Q
2	Frédéric Blackburn	Canada	44.38	Q
3	Sergey Kobyzev	Russia	44.54	
4	Eric Flaim	United States	44.71	

Heat 7

Rank	Athlete	Country	Time	Notes
1	Nicky Gooch	Great Britain	44.03	Q
2	Andy Gabel	United States	44.31	Q
3	Mike McMillen	New Zealand	44.98	
4	Stephan Huygen	Belgium	45.04	

Heat 8

Rank	Athlete	Country	Time	Notes
1	Bjørnar Elgetun	Norway	44.01	Q OR
2	Satoru Terao	Japan	44.88	Q
3	Kieran Hansen	Australia	46.30	
4	Chris Nicholson	New Zealand	63.43	

=== Quarterfinals ===
The top two finishers in each of the four quarterfinals advanced to the semifinals.

Quarterfinal 1

Rank	Athlete	Country	Time	Notes
1	Marc Gagnon	Canada	43.84	Q OR
2	Mirko Vuillermin	Italy	43.85	Q
3	Kim Ki-hoon	South Korea	44.04	
4	Jun Uematsu	Japan	44.20	

Quarterfinal 2

Rank	Athlete	Country	Time	Notes
1	Steven Bradbury	Australia	44.18	Q
2	Nicky Gooch	Great Britain	44.25	Q
3	Satoru Terao	Japan	44.27	
4	Derrick Campbell	Canada	80.27	

Quarterfinal 3

Rank	Athlete	Country	Time	Notes
1	Chae Ji-hoon	South Korea	44.69	Q
2	Martin Johansson	Sweden	44.96	Q
3	Andy Gabel	United States	48.91	
–	Li Jiajun	China	DQ	

Quarterfinal 4

Rank	Athlete	Country	Time	Notes
1	Frédéric Blackburn	Canada	45.20	Q
2	Lee Joon-ho	South Korea	45.27	Q
3	Bjørnar Elgetun	Norway	45.35	
4	Richard Nizielski	Australia	45.57	

=== Semifinals ===
The top two finishers in each of the two semifinals qualified for the A final, while the third and fourth place skaters advanced to the B Final.

Semifinal 1

Rank	Athlete	Country	Time	Notes
1	Mirko Vuillermin	Italy	43.58	QA
2	Chae Ji-hoon	South Korea	43.72	QA
3	Frédéric Blackburn	Canada	44.40	QB
4	Martin Johansson	Sweden	46.04	QB

Semifinal 2

Rank	Athlete	Country	Time	Notes
1	Marc Gagnon	Canada	44.08	QA
2	Nicky Gooch	Great Britain	44.40	QA
3	Lee Joon-ho	South Korea	45.97	QB
4	Steven Bradbury	Australia	63.51	QB

=== Finals ===
The four qualifying skaters competed in Final A, while four others raced for 5th place in Final B.

Final A

Rank	Athlete	Country	Time	Notes
1st place, gold medalist(s)	Chae Ji-hoon	South Korea	43.45	OR
2nd place, silver medalist(s)	Mirko Vuillermin	Italy	43.47	
3rd place, bronze medalist(s)	Nicky Gooch	Great Britain	43.68	
4	Marc Gagnon	Canada	52.73	

Final B

Rank	Athlete	Country	Time	Notes
5	Frédéric Blackburn	Canada	44.97	
6	Lee Joon-ho	South Korea	45.13	
7	Martin Johansson	Sweden	45.24	
8	Steven Bradbury	Australia	45.33	
