= 1977 World Short Track Speed Skating Championships =

1977 sports event (skiing)

- Venue: Grenoble, France
- Dates: 15-17 April

Medalist men
1st place, gold medalist(s)		Gaetan Boucher	CAN
2nd place, silver medalist(s)		Craig Kressler	USA
3rd place, bronze medalist(s)		Hiroshi Toda	JPN

Medalist women
1st place, gold medalist(s)		Brenda Webster	CAN
2nd place, silver medalist(s)		Kathy Vogt	CAN
3rd place, bronze medalist(s)		Valerie Reimann	USA

The 1977 World Short Track Speed Skating Championships were the second championships and took place between April 15 and 17, 1977, in Grenoble, France.

== Results ==
=== Men ===
Event	Gold		Silver		Bronze	
Overall	Gaetan Boucher; Canada		Craig Kressler; United States		Hiroshi Toda; Japan	
500 m	Gaetan Boucher; Canada	46.440	Craig Kressler; United States	46.760	Hiroshi Toda; Japan	47.150
1000 m	Gaetan Boucher; Canada	1:55.690	Steve Pearce; Great Britain	1:56.410	Craig Kressler; United States	1:56.410
1500 m	Hiroshi Toda; Japan	2:27.430	Craig Kressler; United States	2:28.990	Gaetan Boucher; Canada	2:29.610
5000 m	Great Britain	7:34.860	Canada	7:40.490	Japan	7:44.280

=== Women ===
Event	Gold		Silver		Bronze	
Overall	Brenda Webster; Canada		Kathy Vogt; Canada		Valerie Reimann; United States	
500 m	Brenda Webster; Canada	49.540	Kathy Vogt; Canada	49.740	Nancy Dernin; Canada	49.760
1000 m	Kathy Vogt; Canada	1:43.410	Peggy Hartrich; United States	1:43.590	Brenda Webster; Canada	1:47.610
1500 m	Brenda Webster; Canada	2:44.640	Valerie Reimann; United States	2:44.970	Vicki Reimann; United States	2:45.260
3000 m relay	United States	4:47.300	Canada	4:47.520	Japan	5:03.970

== Medal table ==
Rank	Nation	Gold	Silver	Bronze	Total
1	Canada (CAN)	7	4	3	14
2	United States (USA)	1	5	3	9
3	Great Britain (GBR)	1	1	0	2
4	Japan (JPN)	1	0	4	5
Totals (4 entries)		10	10	10	30

== Participating nations ==
- Australia
- Belgium
- Canada
- France
- Great Britain
- Japan
- United States
