= Maurizio Carnino =

Italian speed skater (born 1975)

Medal record

Men's Short Track Speed Skating

Representing Italy

Olympic Games
| Gold medal – first place | 1994 Lillehammer | 5000 m relay |
| Silver medal – second place | 2002 Salt Lake City | 5000 m relay |

World Championships
| Gold medal – first place | 1996 The Hague | 5000 m relay |
| Silver medal – second place | 1995 Gjøvik | 5000 m relay |
| Bronze medal – third place | 1995 Gjøvik | 500 m |
| Bronze medal – third place | 1995 Gjøvik | 1000 m |
| Bronze medal – third place | 2001 Jeonju | 500 m |

World Team Championships
| Bronze medal – third place | 1994 Cambridge | Team |
| Bronze medal – third place | 1997 Seoul | Team |
| Bronze medal – third place | 1998 Bormio | Team |
| Bronze medal – third place | 2000 The Hague | Team |

European Championships
| Gold medal – first place | 1999 Oberstdorf | 5000 m relay |
| Gold medal – first place | 2000 Bormio | 5000 m relay |
| Gold medal – first place | 2001 The Hague | 5000 m relay |
| Gold medal – first place | 2004 Zoetermeer | 5000 m relay |
| Silver medal – second place | 1998 Budapest | 5000 m relay |

Maurizio Carnino (born 7 March 1975 in Turin) is an Italian short track speed skater and long track speed skater. He is a four-time Olympian, competing in the 1994 Lillehammer, 1998 Nagano, 2002 Salt Lake City, and 2006 Turin Winter Olympics.

== Career ==
=== Short track career ===
A specialist in the shorter distances, Carnino was long a dependable member of the Italian short track speed skating relay team. At the 1994 Winter Olympics in Lillehammer, Carnino, as an 18-year-old, was a member of the Italian relay team which won the gold medal in the 5000 metre relay competition along with Orazio Fagone, Hugo Herrnhof and Mirko Vuillermin.

Four years later Carnino competed in the 1998 Winter Olympics where he finished fourth in the 5000 metre relay and 15th in the 500 metres.

At the 2002 Winter Olympics in Salt Lake City, Canino was part of the Italian relay team along with Nicola Franceschina, Nicola Rodigari, Fabio Carta and Michele Antonioli, and the team won the silver medal in the 5000 metre relay competition. Carnino was the only skater from 1994 still on the team.

=== Long track career ===
With the 2006 Winter Olympics being held in his native Turin, Carnino decided to switch to long track speed skating. He placed second at the 2005 and 2006 national sprint speed skating championships, and qualified for the Olympics, where he finished 30th in the 1000 metres and 31st in the 500 metres.
