= Stephan Huygen =

Belgian speed skater

Personal information
- Nationality: Belgian
- Born: 7 February 1968 (age 58) Ekeren, Belgium

Sport
- Sport: Short track speed skating

Stephan Huygen (born 7 February 1968) is a Belgian short track speed skater. He competed in the men's 500 metres event at the 1994 Winter Olympics.
