= 1976 World Short Track Speed Skating Championships =

1976 sports event (skiing)

- Venue: University of Illinois Ice Arena, Champaign, Illinois
- Dates: 9–11 April

Medalist men
1st place, gold medalist(s)		Alan Rattray	USA
2nd place, silver medalist(s)		Gaetan Boucher	CAN
3rd place, bronze medalist(s)		Andre Chabrerie	FRA

Medalist women
1st place, gold medalist(s)		Celeste Chlapaty	USA
2nd place, silver medalist(s)		Kathy Vogt	CAN
3rd place, bronze medalist(s)		Peggy Hartrich	USA

The 1976 World Short Track Speed Skating Championships were the first ever championships and took place between April 9 and 11, 1976 in Champaign, Illinois. The World Championships are organised by the ISU which also run world cups and championships in speed skating and figure skating.

== Results ==
=== Men ===
Event	Gold		Silver		Bronze	
Overall*	Alan Rattray; USA		Gaetan Boucher; Canada		Andre Chabrerie; France	
500 m	Alan Rattray; USA	45.870	Gaetan Boucher; Canada	-	Bob Fenn; USA	-
1000 m	Alan Rattray; USA	1:45.780	Gaetan Boucher; Canada	-	Philip Walker; GBR	-
1500 m	Alan Rattray; USA	2:27.310	Colin Coates; Australia	-	Jack Mortell; USA	-
3000 m	Andre Chabrerie; France	5:34.200	Pat Maxwell; USA	-	Jack Mortell; USA	-
3000 m relay	GBR	4:41.010	USA	4:43.470	Belgium	4:44.600
5000 m relay	USA	7:53.200	GBR	7:54.050	Belgium	-

* First place is awarded 5 points, second is awarded 3 points, third is awarded 2 points, fourth is awarded 1 point in the finals of each individual race to determine the overall world champion. The relays do not count for the overall classification.

=== Women ===
Event	Gold		Silver		Bronze	
Overall*	Celeste Chlapaty; USA		Kathy Vogt; Canada		Peggy Hartrich; USA	
500 m	Kathy Vogt; Canada	50.570	Celeste Chlapaty; USA	-	Peggy Hartrich; USA	-
1000 m	Celeste Chlapaty; USA	1:50.390	Denise Chlapaty; USA	-	Margaret Hanson; Canada	-
1500 m	Celeste Chlapaty; USA	2:40.120	Kathy Vogt; Canada	-	Peggy Hartrich; USA	-
3000 m	Kathy Vogt; Canada	6:06.310	Peggy Hartrich; USA	-	Celeste Chlapaty; USA	-
3000 m relay	USA	4:42.490	Canada	4:49.470		

* First place is awarded 5 points, second is awarded 3 points, third is awarded 2 points, fourth is awarded 1 point in the finals of each individual race to determine the overall world champion. The relays do not count for the overall classification.

== Medal table ==
Rank	Nation	Gold	Silver	Bronze	Total
1	United States (USA)	9	5	7	21
2	Canada (CAN)	2	6	1	9
3	Great Britain (GBR)	1	1	1	3
4	France (FRA)	1	0	1	2
5	Australia (AUS)	0	1	0	1
6	Belgium (BEL)	0	0	2	2
Totals (6 entries)		13	13	12	38
