= Cindy Meyer =

South African speed skater

Personal information
- Nationality: South African
- Born: 21 June 1964 (age 60); Boksburg, South Africa

Sport
- Sport: Short track speed skating

Cindy Meyer (born 21 June 1964) is a South African short track speed skater. She competed in two events at the 1994 Winter Olympics.
