= Mirko Vuillermin =

Short track speed skater

Medal record

Men's Short Track Speed Skating

Representing Italy

Olympic Games
Gold medal – first place	1994 Lillehammer	5000 m relay
Silver medal – second place	1994 Lillehammer	500 m

World Championships
Gold medal – first place	1993 Beijing	500 m
Gold medal – first place	1996 Den Haag	5000 relay
Silver medal – second place	1995 Gjøvik	500 m
Silver medal – second place	1996 Den Haag	500 m
Silver medal – second place	1993 Beijing	5000 relay
Silver medal – second place	1995 Gjøvik	5000 relay
Bronze medal – third place	1996 Den Haag	3000 m
Bronze medal – third place	1997 Nagano	1500 m
Bronze medal – third place	1997 Nagano	5000 relay

World Team Championships
Gold medal – first place	1993 Budapest	Team
Silver medal – second place	1992 Minamimaki	Team
Bronze medal – third place	1994 Cambridge	Team
Bronze medal – third place	1996 Lake Placid	Team
Bronze medal – third place	1997 Seoul	Team

European Championships
Gold medal – first place	1997 Malmö	1500m
Gold medal – first place	1997 Malmö	500m
Silver medal – second place	1997 Malmö	Overall
Bronze medal – third place	1997 Malmö	1000m

Mirko Vuillermin (born 2 August 1973) is a retired Italian short track speed skater who competed in the 1992 Winter Olympics and in the 1994 Winter Olympics.

== Career ==
Vuillermin was born in Aosta. At the 1992 Winter Olympics in Albertville, Vuillermin was a member of the Italian relay team that finished eighth in the 5000 metre relay.

On 27 March 1993, at the World Short Track Speed Skating Championships in Beijing, Vuillermin broke Mark Lackie's 500 m world record, recording a time of 43.08, with the gold medal in the 500 metres, which was Italy's first individual world championship gold medal in short track speed skating.

At the 1994 Winter Olympics in Lillehammer, Vuillermin won the gold medal in the 5000 metre relay along with Maurizio Carnino, Orazio Fagone and Hugo Herrnhof. He also claimed the silver medal in the 500 metres, and finished 21st In the 1000 metres.

On 29 March 1996 Vuillermin captured another 500 m world record, winning the 500-meter race in 42.68 seconds at the World Short Track Speed Skating Team Championships in Lake Placid.

In 1997, Vuillermin competed in newly established European Short Track Speed Skating Championships, where he won the 500 metres and 1500 metres, and took the runner-up spot behind Italian fellow Fabio Carta in the overall competition.

== Retirement ==
Vuillermin's career suddenly ended on 20 June 1997. Just weeks after teammate Orazio Fagone had his right leg amputated in a motorcycle accident, Vuillermin nearly suffered the same fate. He crashed his motorcycle into a truck in Quart, Aosta Valley, suffering severe injuries. It took him a year and a half to recover, but he would never again ice skate competitively.
