= Jim Lynch (speed skater) =

Australian speed skater

Personal information
- Born: 16 March 1948 (age 78) Sydney, Australia

Sport
- Sport: Speed skating

James Anthony Lynch (born 16 March 1948) is an Australian speed skater. He competed in two events at the 1972 Winter Olympics. Lynch became part of the Sports Australia Hall of Fame in 1991.
