= 2027 World Short Track Speed Skating Championships =

Short track speed skating championships

- Venue: Mokdong Ice Rink
- Location: Seoul, South Korea
- Dates: 12–14 March

The 2027 World Short Track Speed Skating Championships will be held from 12 to 14 March 2027 at the Mokdong Ice Rink in Seoul, South Korea.

== Schedule ==
The Championships consists of nine events: three individual events for men and women and three team events.

== Medal summary ==
=== Men ===
Event	Gold	Silver	Bronze
500 m			
1000 m			
1500 m			
5000 m relay			

=== Women ===
Event	Gold	Silver	Bronze
500 m			
1000 m			
1500 m			
3000 m relay			

=== Mixed ===
Event	Gold	Silver	Bronze
2000 m relay			
