= Colin Coates =

Australian speed skater

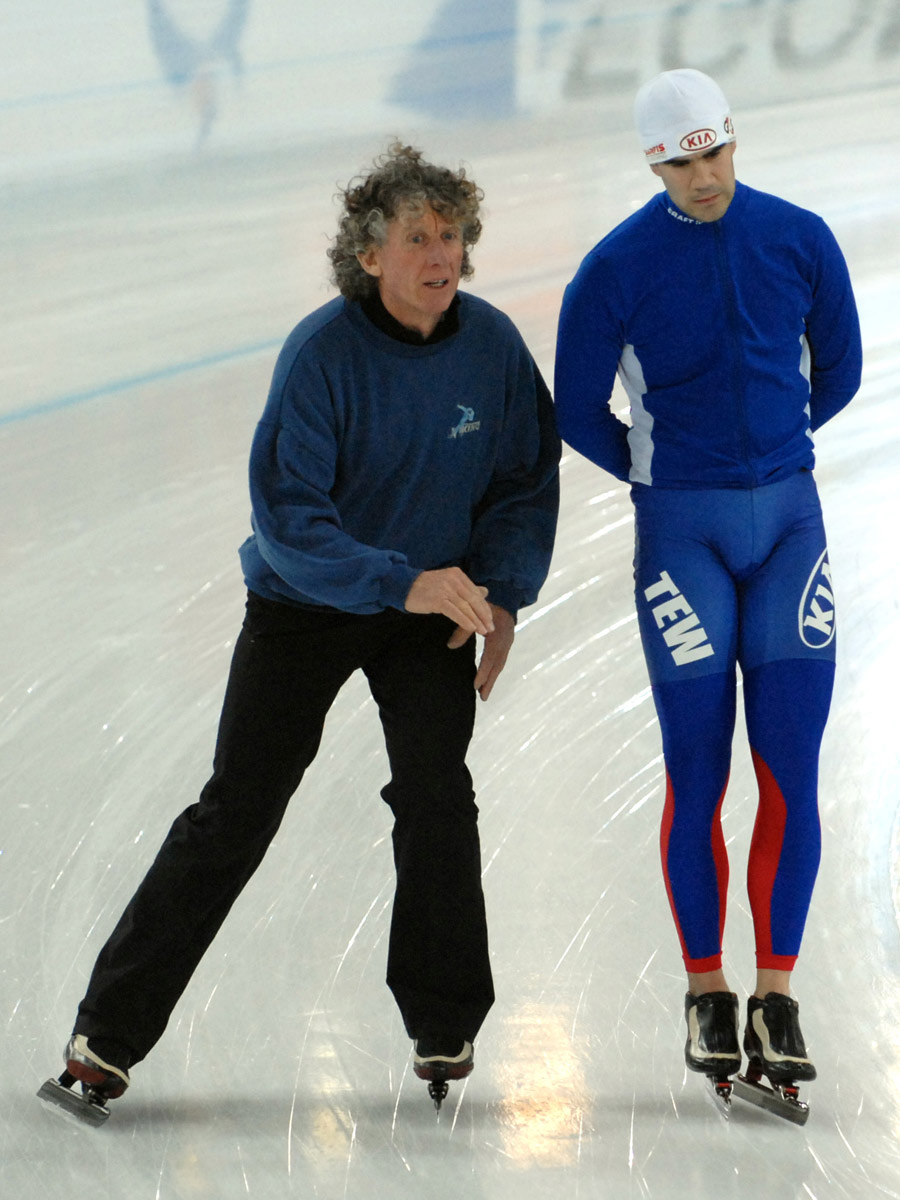
- Coates coaching Pascal Briand at the World Allround Championships in Hamar in 2009.

Medal record

Men's short track speed skating

Representing Australia

World Championships
Silver medal – second place	1976 Champaign	1500 m

Colin Victor Coates, OAM (born 4 April 1946) is a former ice speed skater from Australia, who represented his native country in a record six consecutive Winter Olympics, starting in 1968 in Grenoble, France.

== Skating career ==
Coates competed in six Winter Olympics, starting in 1968 at Grenoble, at age 21, before finishing at the 1988 Winter Olympics in Calgary, Canada, aged 41. He competed over 10,000m, 5000m, 1500m, 1000m and the 500m, for a best placing of 6th in the 10,000m in Innsbruck, Austria, during the 1976 Winter Olympics, this was also at the time, Australia's best ever placing in a Winter Olympics. He would finish his Olympic career in controversial circumstances, as although technically listed as an athlete for the 1988 Winter Olympics in the 10,000m, he was in reality a coach, with his athletic listing simply to make up numbers so that the Olympic team could take more support staff and also to allow Coates the ability to skate on the ice with the rest of the team during practice. He was told by Chef de Mission Geoff Henke that he was not to compete, due to the Australian Skating Union refusing to give their permission. After multiple denied requests by Coates, he gave the impression of having accepted his fate. He would instead take part in the event, without Henke's knowledge. Henke was furious and attempted to take him off the ice mid race. Henke instead decided to wait until Coates had finished. Coates would finish with an Australian Record time of 14:41.88, to place 26th out of 32. After being admonished by Henke, Coates received a telegram from then Australian Prime Minister, Bob Hawke, congratulating him on a great performance at his sixth Olympic Games.

Coates was awarded the Australian Sports Medal in 2000, and the Medal of the Order of Australia in the 2022 Queen's Birthday Honours.

== Achievements ==
- World Allround Speed Skating Championships for Men (13 participations):
  - 1968, 1972, 1973, 1974, 1975, 1976, 1977, 1978, 1979, 1980, 1981, 1983, 1984
    - Best result 11th in 1974
- World Sprint Speed Skating Championships for Men (7 participations):
  - 1972, 1973, 1974, 1975, 1978, 1979, 1980
    - Best result 21st in 1972

== Personal records ==
Personal records
Men's Speed skating
Event	Result	Date	Location	Notes
500 m	40.14	1976-03-13	Inzell	
1,000 m	1:19.47	1976-03-13	Inzell	
1,500 m	2:00.79	1979-01-26	Davos	
5,000 m	7:12.95	1984-01-07	Inzell	
10,000 m	14:41.88	1988-02-21	Calgary	

== See also ==
- List of athletes with the most appearances at Olympic Games
