= Alex Varnyú =

Hungarian short track speed skater

Personal information
- Nationality: Hungarian
- Born: 1 August 1995 (age 30) Budapest, Hungary

Sport
- Country: Hungary
- Sport: Short track speed skating
- Club: Ferencvárosi Torna Club
Medal record
World Championships
Silver medal – second place	2021 Dordrecht	5000 m relay
Bronze medal – third place	2019 Sofia	5000 m relay
European Championships
Gold medal – first place	2019 Dordrecht	5000 m relay

Alex Varnyú (born 1 August 1995) is a Hungarian short track speed skater. He participated at the 2019 World Short Track Speed Skating Championships, winning a medal.
