= Maryse Perreault =

Canadian short track speed skater

Maryse Perreault (born June 4, 1964) is a former short track speed skater who competed on the Canadian speed skating team from 1981 to 1990. At the World Short Track Speed Skating Championships during these years, she won over twenty combined medals in individual races and the 3000 metres relay. In the overall World Championships classification, Perreault was the 1982 ladies champion and had a top three placing in 1983, 1986 and 1989. Outside of the World Championships, Perreault won bronze at the 1988 Winter Olympics in the 3000 metres relay when short track speed skating was a demonstration sport. Perreault was named to the Speed Skating Canada Hall of Fame in 1990 and the Canadian Olympic Hall of Fame in 1992.

== Biography ==
Perreault was born on 4 June 1964 in Windsor, Quebec and began her speed skating career when she was eleven. From 1981 to 1990, Perreault competed on the Canadian speed skating team. At the World Short Track Speed Skating Championships, Perreault won fourteen individual medals between 1982 and 1989, ranging from the 500 metres to 3000 metres events. These medals included silver at the 500 metres in 1986 and gold for the 1000 metres in 1989.

With the Canadian team, Perreault won consecutive golds in the 3000 metres relay from 1981 to 1990 except for a silver medal in 1985. In the overall classification, Perreault was the 1982 ladies champion and won bronze in 1983. Her additional classification medals was a shared silver in 1986 and a silver in 1989. At individual world championships, Perreault broke the 1000 metres record for women short track speed skaters in 1986.

Following the 1982 world championships, Perreault did not win an individual gold medal until 1987. During this time period, Perreault won bronze in the 500 metres and silver in the 1500 metres at the 1985 Winter Universiade . Years later, Perreault competed at the 1988 Winter Olympics when speed skating was a demonstration sport. During her races, Perreault attempted to win silver during the 1000 meters final when she fell after Jinyan Li collided with her.

Apart from her fifth place Olympic finish in the 1000 metres, Perreault won bronze in the 3000 metres relay and was eighth in the 3000 metres. She also was eliminated during the heats of the 500 metres and 1500 metres events. In October 1990, Perreault was suspended from the Canadian Amateur Skating Association. The following month, Perreault stated she ended her speed skating career during a press conference. Perreault was named one of the Short Track Athletes of the Year in 1986 for Speed Skating Canada. She was inducted into the Speed Skating Canada Hall of Fame in 1990 and the Canadian Olympic Hall of Fame in 1992.
