= Miyoshi Kato =

Japanese speed skater (born 1962)

Personal information
- Nationality: Japanese
- Born: 31 July 1962 (age 62); Aichi, Japan

Sport
- Sport: Speed skating

Miyoshi Kato (加藤 美善, Katō Miyoshi, born 31 July 1962) is a Japanese speed skater. She competed in three events at the 1980 Winter Olympics.
