= 1995 World Short Track Speed Skating Championships =

Speed skating championship

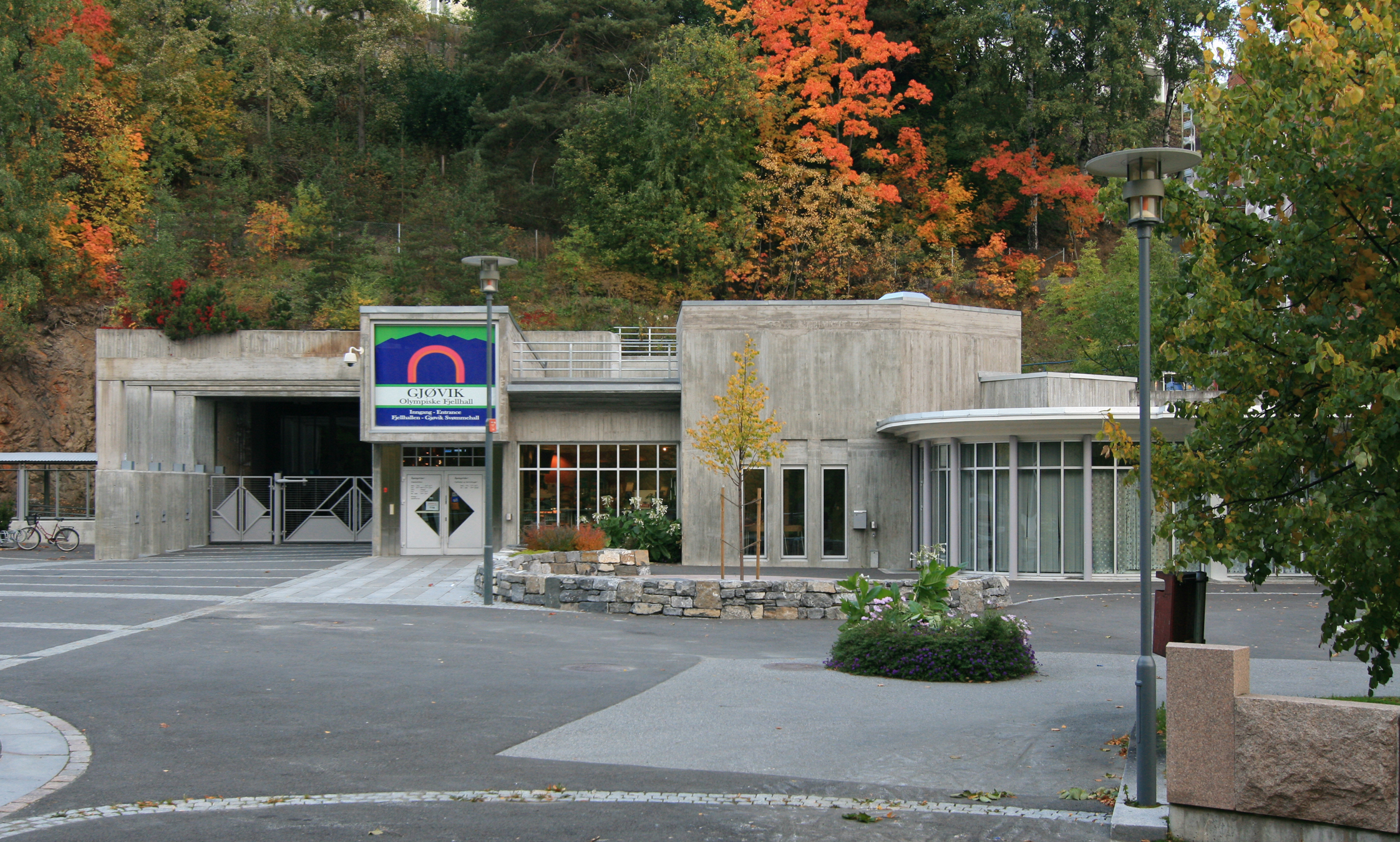
The tournament was held at Gjøvik Olympic Cavern Hall

The 1995 World Short Track Speed Skating Championships were held from 17 to 19 March 1995 at the Gjøvik Olympic Cavern Hall in Gjøvik, Norway. They were the twentieth World Short Track Speed Skating Championships and the first to be held in Norway. It consisted of ten events, five for men and five for women, including one relay each. The overall winner of the men's races was South Korea's Chae Ji-hoon, who won three of the men's four individual events, with the last gold going to Canada's Marc Gagnon. In the women's events, South Korea's Chun Lee-kyung won ahead of China's Wang Chunlu, with both winning two individual races. The men's relay was won by Canada, while the women's relay was won by China. The overall medal table was topped by South Korea with five first places and twelve medals overall.

Originally the event was planned to take place at the Hamar Olympic Amphitheatre in Hamar, the same venue which hosted short track speed skating at the 1994 Winter Olympics. However, because Storhamar was at scheduled time playing play-offs in the Norwegian Ice Hockey Championship, it was in December 1994 decided to move the tournament to Gjøvik. The events were held in Gjøvik Olympic Cavern Hall, the world's largest room within a mountain. It was opened in 1993 for the 1994 Winter Olympics, where it had hosted 16 ice hockey matches. The hall is located within walking distance of the city center of Gjøvik, and has a capacity for 5,500 spectators.

The championship opened on Friday 17 March with the 1500 meter races, and was followed by the 500 meter races the following day. The remaining events were held on 19 March. It is the only time the world championship has been held in Norway. There were set six world records during the championship. Chae Ji-hoon's time 4:56.29 in the men's 3000 meter and Chun Lee-kyung at 5:02.18 in the women's 3000 meter. Kim Yun-mi set the record on the women's 500 meter at 45.33 in an introductory race, while Frederic Blackburn set a world record at 2:19.71 in the semi-final of the 1500 meter. Both the relay teams also set world records: Canada with the men's record at 7:09.76 and the China with the women's at 4:26.68.

== Results ==
=== Men ===
Event	Gold		Silver		Bronze	
Overall	Chae Ji-hoon; South Korea	15 points	Marc Gagnon; Canada	6 points	Frederic Blackburn; Canada; Song Jae-kun; South Korea	5 points
500 m	Chae Ji-hoon; South Korea	43.98	Mirko Vuillermin; Italy	44.25	Maurizio Carnino; Italy	44.40
1000 m	Marc Gagnon; Canada	1:35.38	Frederic Blackburn; Canada	1:35.42	Maurizio Carnino; Italy	1:35.57
1500 m	Chae Ji-hoon; South Korea	2:30.47	Eric Flaim; United States	2:30.52	Lee Joon-ho; South Korea	2:31.11
3000 m	Chae Ji-hoon; South Korea	4:56.29	Song Jae-kun; South Korea	4:58.97	Frederic Blackburn; Canada	5:03.39
5000 m	Canada	7:09.76 (WR)	Italy	7:11.44	Japan	7:11.71

=== Women ===
Event	Gold		Silver		Bronze	
Overall	Chun Lee-kyung; South Korea	13 points	Wang Chunlu; China	12 points	Kim Yun-mi; South Korea	6 points
500 m	Wang Chunlu; China	45.72	Isabelle Charest; Canada	45.80	Kim Yun-mi; South Korea	45.82
1000 m	Wang Chunlu; China	1:45.21	Chun Lee-kyung; South Korea	1:45.39	Kim So-hee; South Korea	1:45.47
1500 m	Chun Lee-kyung; South Korea	2:46.73	Kim So-hee; South Korea	2:46.75	Wang Chunlu; China	2:46.99
3000 m	Chun Lee-kyung; South Korea	5:02.18	Kim Yun-mi; South Korea	5:06.54	Evgenia Radanova; Bulgaria	5:07.93
3000 m relay	China	4:24.68 (WR)	South Korea	4:24.75	Canada	4:26.57

== Medal table ==
Rank	Nation	Gold	Silver	Bronze	Total
1	South Korea (KOR)	7	5	5	17
2	China (CHN)	3	1	1	5
3	Canada (CAN)	2	3	3	8
4	Italy (ITA)	0	2	2	4
5	United States (USA)	0	1	0	1
6	Bulgaria (BUL)	0	0	1	1
6	Japan (JPN)	0	0	1	1
Totals (7 entries)		12	12	13	37
