= Craig Kressler =

American speed skater

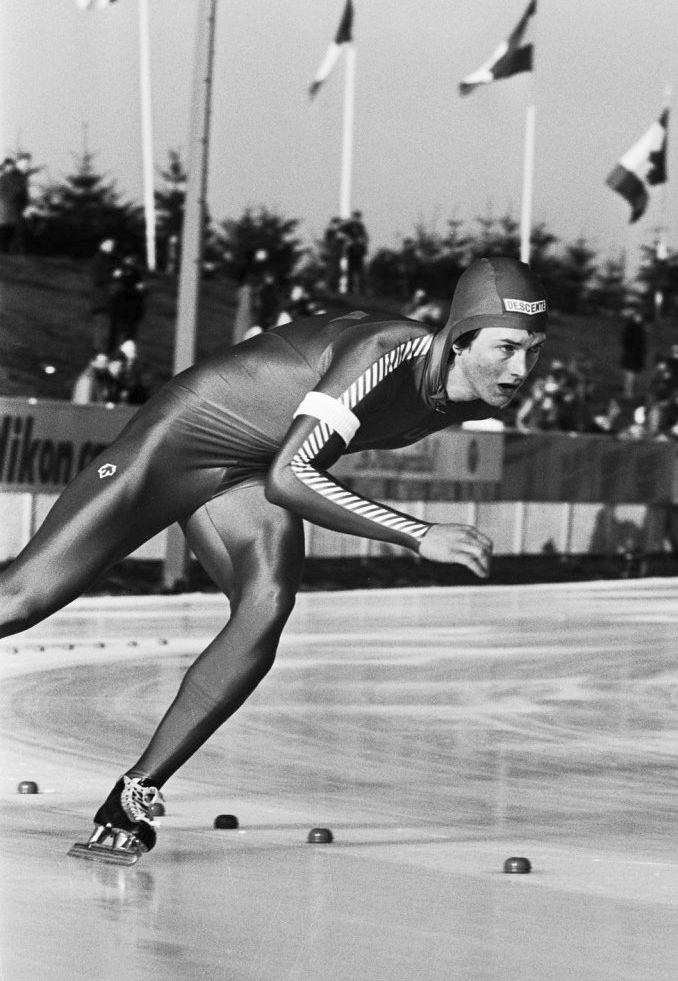
- Craig Kressler in 1980

Personal information
- Born: June 23, 1961 (age 65) Midland, Michigan, United States
- Height: 1.81 m (5 ft 11 in)
- Weight: 68 kg (150 lb)

Sport
- Sport: Speed skating
- Club: Midland

Craig Ross Kressler (born June 23, 1961) is a retired American speed skater. At the 1979 World Junior Championships he won the 500 and 3000 m distances and finished third all-around. He competed in four speed skating events at the 1980 Winter Olympics with the best achievement of 11th place in the 500 m. Two weeks later he won a silver all-around medal at the World Junior Championships and retired from competitions.

Personal bests:

- 500 m – 38.72 (1980)
- 1000 m – 1:16.45 (1980)
- 1500 m – 1:58.34 (1980)
- 5000 m – 7:15.90 (1980)
- 10000 m – 15:49.11 (1980)
