= Sandrine Daudet =

French short track speed skater (1972–2019)

Personal information
- Nationality: French
- Born: 21 June 1972; Fontenay-sous-Bois, Val-de-Marne, France
- Died: 18 November 2019 (aged 47)

Sport
- Sport: Short track speed skating

Sandrine Daudet (21 June 1972 – 18 November 2019) was a French short track speed skater. She competed at the 1992 Winter Olympics and the 1994 Winter Olympics.
