= Ayako Tsubaki =

Japanese speed skater (born 1969)

Personal information
- Nationality: Japanese
- Born: 3 December 1969 (age 55); Hokkaido, Japan

Sport
- Sport: Short track speed skating

Ayako Tsubaki (椿 文子, Tsubaki Ayako, born 3 December 1969) is a Japanese short track speed skater. She competed at the 1994 Winter Olympics and the 1998 Winter Olympics.
