= Joëlle van Koetsveld van Ankeren =

Dutch speed skater

Personal information
- Nationality: Dutch
- Born: 2 June 1973 (age 51); Amsterdam, Netherlands

Sport
- Sport: Short track speed skating

Joëlle van Koetsveld van Ankeren (born 2 June 1973) is a Dutch short track speed skater. She competed in two events at the 1992 Winter Olympics.
