= Valérie Barizza =

French speed skater (born 1967)

Personal information
- Nationality: French
- Born: 14 August 1967 (age 57); La Tronche, France

Sport
- Sport: Short track speed skating

Valérie Barizza (born 14 August 1967) is a French short track speed skater. She competed at the 1992 Winter Olympics and the 1994 Winter Olympics.
