= Brenda Webster (speed skater) =

Canadian speed skater

Personal information
- Born: 21 July 1961 (age 63); Regina, Saskatchewan, Canada

Sport
- Sport: Speed skating

Brenda Webster (born 21 July 1961) is a Canadian former short track and long track speed skater. She competed in three events at the 1980 Winter Olympics. She became the world champion at the World Short Track Speed Skating Championships in 1977.

She was inducted into the Saskatchewan Sport Hall of Fame in 1991.
