= Guy Daignault =

Canadian speed skater

Guy Daignault (died 27 January 2005) was a Canadian short track speed skater. He was the world champion short track speed skater in 1982 and 1984, having been the men's gold medal winner in the 1982 and 1984 World Short Track Speed Skating Championships. He was also a member of the Canadian men's short track relay teams which took the gold medal in the 1981, 1982, 1983, and 1984 at the World Short Track Speed Skating Championships, though no world championship titles for men's relay were awarded in those years.

Daignault was killed in a car crash in 2005.
