= Laure Drouet =

French speed skater (born 1970)

Personal information
- Nationality: French
- Born: 5 May 1970 (age 54); Ermont, France

Sport
- Sport: Short track speed skating

Laure Drouet (born 5 May 1970) is a French short track speed skater. She competed in three events at the 1994 Winter Olympics.
