= Chun Lee-kyung =

Short-track speed skater

Personal information
- Born: January 6, 1976 (age 50)
- Height: 1.63 m (5 ft 4 in)
- Weight: 58 kg (128 lb; 9.1 st)

Sport
- Country: South Korea
- Sport: Speed skating
- Retired: 1998
Medal record
Women's short-track speed skating
Representing South Korea
Event	1st	2nd	3rd
Olympic Games	4	0	1
World Championships	9	11	3
World Team Championships	4	2	0
Olympic Games
Gold medal – first place	1998 Nagano	1000 m
Gold medal – first place	1998 Nagano	3000 m relay
Gold medal – first place	1994 Lillehammer	1000 m
Gold medal – first place	1994 Lillehammer	3000 m relay
Bronze medal – third place	1998 Nagano	500 m
World Championships
Gold medal – first place	1995 Gjøvik	1500 m
Gold medal – first place	1995 Gjøvik	3000 m
Gold medal – first place	1995 Gjøvik	Overall
Gold medal – first place	1996 The Hague	1500 m
Gold medal – first place	1996 The Hague	Overall
Gold medal – first place	1997 Nagano	1500 m
Gold medal – first place	1997 Nagano	3000 m
Gold medal – first place	1997 Nagano	Overall
Gold medal – first place	1998 Vienna	3000 m
Silver medal – second place	1993 Beijing	1500 m
Silver medal – second place	1993 Beijing	3000 m
Silver medal – second place	1993 Beijing	Overall
Silver medal – second place	1995 Gjovik	1000 m
Silver medal – second place	1995 Gjovik	3000 m relay
Silver medal – second place	1996 The Hague	1000 m
Silver medal – second place	1996 The Hague	3000 m
Silver medal – second place	1997 Nagano	3000 m relay
Silver medal – second place	1998 Vienna	1000 m
Silver medal – second place	1998 Vienna	Overall
Silver medal – second place	1998 Vienna	3000 m relay
Bronze medal – third place	1993 Beijing	3000 m relay
Bronze medal – third place	1994 Guildford	3000 m relay
Bronze medal – third place	1997 Nagano	1000 m
World Team Championships
Gold medal – first place	1992 Nobeyama	Team
Gold medal – first place	1995 Zoetermeer	Team
Gold medal – first place	1996 Lake Placid	Team
Gold medal – first place	1997 Seoul	Team
Silver medal – second place	1994 Cambridge	Team
Silver medal – second place	1998 Bormio	Team
Asian Winter Games
Gold medal – first place	1996 Harbin	1000 m
Silver medal – second place	1990 Sapporo	3000 m relay
Silver medal – second place	1996 Harbin	1500 m
Bronze medal – third place	1990 Sapporo	1000 m
Bronze medal – third place	1996 Harbin	3000 m

- Chun Lee-kyung
- Hangul: 전이경
- Hanja: 全利卿
- RR: Jeon Igyeong
- MR: Chŏn Igyŏng

Chun Lee-kyung (Korean: 전이경; Hanja: 全利卿; born January 6, 1976, in Okcheon, Chungcheongbuk-do) is a retired South Korean short track speed skater. She is a four-time Olympic Champion and three-time Overall World Champion for 1995–1997. She was a dominant force in International Short Track Speed Skating during the mid-1990s.

Chun took part in the 1992 Winter Olympics in Albertville, France, at the age of 15, but failed to win much attention. In 1994, however, Chun won two gold medals at the Lillehammer Winter Olympic Games. She won the women's 1000 m final, defeating the reigning World Champion Nathalie Lambert and former World Champion Kim So-hee, and was part of the team that won the 3000 m relay in a world record time along with Kim.

Between 1994 and 1998 Winter Olympics, Chun won the Overall World Championship three times in a row, in 1995, 1996 and 1997 (becoming the second person to have won three consecutive Overall World Championships). She shared the 1997 title though with Yang Yang (A), her most significant career rival. She also won the Overall World Cup title for 1997–1998 season.

In 1998, at the Nagano Winter Olympics, Chun successfully defended both of her Olympic titles, by defeating China's Yang Yang (A) and Yang Yang (S) in the 1000 m final after trailing for most of the race. Yang Yang (A) crossed the line together with Chun in what was ruled and reviewed as a photo finish, but was then disqualified for cross tracking Chun at the very end as Chun tried to pass on the inside (although the photo finish seemed to show Chun having defeated her for the gold regardless). She led the relay team to another Olympic victory with world record time, completing the first "double-double" in Olympic short track history. She also added a 5th Olympic medal, a surprising bronze in the 500 metres, her weakest event and which she had never won a World Championship medal in. She was advanced to the bronze after winning the B final, due to a major fall in the A final leading to the disqualification of Isabelle Charest, and the refusal to finish of Wang Chunlu. She became the first quadruple Olympic Champion in Short Track Speed Skating and the first one from Korea. One month later at the 1998 World Championships, her final major international meet, Chun won 4 medals including her 3rd title at 3000 metres, but was still narrowly denied a 4th consecutive Overall World Championship by Yang Yang (A) (the 2nd of Yang Yang (A)'s own 6 consecutive titles, after having tied Chun for the 97 title). The key event to the final overall result was the 1000 metres, where just as in Nagano Chun and Yang Yang (A) crossed in a virtual dead heat over the distance, but this time with Yang emerging the victor and getting the crucial 1st place points to the overall title with it. This provided the final chapter to the intense rivalry of the 2 all-time greats, as Chun would retire immediately after the meet.

In 2002, Chun was elected to the Athletes' Committee of the International Olympic Committee.
