= 1996 World Short Track Speed Skating Championships =

The 1996 World Short Track Speed Skating Championships took place between March 1 and 3, 1996 in The Hague, Netherlands. The World Championships are organised by the ISU which also run world cups and championships in speed skating and figure skating.

== Results ==
=== Men ===
Event	Gold		Silver		Bronze	
Overall*	Marc Gagnon; Canada	11 points	Chae Ji-hoon; South Korea	9 points	Orazio Fagone; Italy	5 points
500 m	Orazio Fagone; Italy	43.071	Mirko Vuillermin; Italy	43.252	Frederic Blackburn; Canada	43.603
1000 m	Li Jiajun; China	1:32.028	Marc Gagnon; Canada	1:32.107	Chae Ji-hoon; South Korea	1:32.143
1500 m	Marc Gagnon; Canada	2:18.160	Nicky Gooch; United Kingdom	2:18.291	Chae Ji-hoon; South Korea	2:18.491
3000 m	Chae Ji-hoon; South Korea	5:00.557	Marc Gagnon; Canada	5:01.046	Mirko Vuillermin; Italy	5:01.078
5000 m relay	Italy	7:04.914	Canada	7:05.133	South Korea	7:07.598

* First place is awarded 5 points, second is awarded 3 points, third is awarded 2 points, fourth is awarded 1 point in the finals of each individual race to determine the overall world champion. The relays do not count for the overall classification.

=== Women ===
Event	Gold		Silver		Bronze	
Overall*	Chun Lee-kyung; South Korea	11 points	Won Hye-kyung; South Korea	9 points	Isabelle Charest; Canada	7 points
500 m	Isabelle Charest; Canada	45.650	Annie Perreault; Canada	46.015	Marinella Canclini; Italy	46.181
1000 m	Marinella Canclini; Italy	1:39.656	Chun Lee-kyung; South Korea	1:39.858	Isabelle Charest; Canada	1:39.995
1500 m	Chun Lee-kyung; South Korea	2:35.494	Won Hye-kyung; South Korea	2:35.506	Sun Dandan; China	2:37.286
3000 m	Won Hye-kyung; South Korea	5:23.666	Chun Lee-kyung; South Korea	5:34.939	Sun Dandan; China	5:40.709
3000 m relay	Italy	4:21.494	China	4:22.067	USA	4:27.128

* First place is awarded 5 points, second is awarded 3 points, third is awarded 2 points, fourth is awarded 1 point in the finals of each individual race to determine the overall world champion. The relays do not count for the overall classification.

== Medal table ==
Rank	Nation	Gold	Silver	Bronze	Total
1	South Korea (KOR)	4	5	3	12
2	Italy (ITA)	4	1	3	8
3	Canada (CAN)	3	4	3	10
4	China (CHN)	1	1	2	4
5	Great Britain (GBR)	0	1	0	1
6	United States (USA)	0	0	1	1
Totals (6 entries)		12	12	12	36
