= Kathy Vogt =

Canadian speed skater

Personal information
- Nationality: Canadian
- Born: March 7, 1959 (age 66); Elkhart, Indiana, United States

Sport
- Sport: Speed skating

Kathy Vogt (born March 7, 1959) is an American-born Canadian speed skater. She competed at the 1976 Winter Olympics and the 1980 Winter Olympics.

== Personal life ==
Vogt married Canadian hockey player Randy Gregg on June 9, 1984, in Edmonton. They have four children: Ryan, Sarah, and speed-skaters Jessica Gregg, and Jamie Gregg. Vogt and her family reside in Edmonton, Alberta.
