= Annie Perreault =

Canadian short track speed skater

Medal record

Women's short track speed skating

Representing Canada

Olympic Games
Gold medal – first place	1998 Nagano	500 m
Gold medal – first place	1992 Albertville	3000 m relay
Bronze medal – third place	1998 Nagano	3000 m relay

World Championships
Gold medal – first place	1997 Nagano	3000 m relay
Gold medal – first place	1992 Denver	3000 m relay
Gold medal – first place	1991 Sydney	3000 m relay
Gold medal – first place	1990 Amsterdam	3000 m relay
Silver medal – second place	1998 Vienna	500 m
Silver medal – second place	1996 The Hague	500 m
Bronze medal – third place	2000 Sheffield	3000 m
Bronze medal – third place	2002 Montreal	3000 m relay
Bronze medal – third place	2000 Sheffield	3000 m relay
Bronze medal – third place	1995 Gjovik	3000 m relay

World Team Championships
Gold medal – first place	1991 Seoul	Team
Silver medal – second place	1999 St. Louis	Team
Silver medal – second place	1997 Seoul	Team
Bronze medal – third place	2002 Milwaukee	Team
Bronze medal – third place	1998 Bormio	Team
Bronze medal – third place	1995 Zoetermeer	Team

Annie Perreault (born 28 July 1971 in Windsor, Quebec) is a Canadian short track speed skater, who won medals in the 500 m and 3000 m relay at the 1998 Winter Olympics. She had already won a relay gold medal at the 1992 Winter Olympics.

In 2016, Perreault was awarded the Order of Sport, marking her induction into Canada's Sports Hall of Fame.
