= Derrick Campbell =

Short-track speed skater

Personal information
- Born: February 18, 1972 (age 54)

Sport
- Country: Canada
- Sport: Short track speed skating
Medal record
Men's short track speed skating
Representing Canada
Olympic Games
Gold medal – first place	1998 Nagano	5000 m relay
World Championships
Gold medal – first place	1997 Nagano	500 m
Gold medal – first place	1998 Vienna	5000 m relay
Silver medal – second place	1994 Guildford	500 m
Silver medal – second place	1996 Hague	5000 m relay
Silver medal – second place	1997 Nagano	5000 m relay
Bronze medal – third place	1994 Guildford	1000 m
Bronze medal – third place	1994 Guildford	1500 m
Bronze medal – third place	1997 Nagano	Overall
Bronze medal – third place	1994 Guildford	5000 m relay
Bronze medal – third place	1999 Sofia	5000 m relay
World Team Championships
Gold medal – first place	1995 Zoetermeer	Team
Gold medal – first place	1996 Lake Placid	Team
Silver medal – second place	1994 Cambridge	Team
Silver medal – second place	1999 St. Louis	Team
Bronze medal – third place	1991 Seoul	Team

Derrick Nathan Campbell (born February 18, 1972) is a Canadian short track speed skater who competed in the 1994 Winter Olympics and in the 1998 Winter Olympics.

== Career ==
He was born in Cambridge, Ontario.

In 1994 he was a member of the Canadian relay team which finished fourth in the 5000 metre relay competition. In the 1000 m event he finished sixth and in the 500 m contest he finished eleventh. In the 1000 m contest Campbell was obstructed by the Briton Nicky Gooch, who was disqualified. Campbell got up and thought he finished the race, and was celebrating his bronze medal with a Canadian Broadcasting Corporation reporter live on television when he discovered he hadn't completed the race. He had miscounted and left the track one lap short of the finish line, and was classified as a non-finisher. This meant that Marc Gagnon was a surprise bronze medallist, even though he wasn't even in the A final. Gagnon was first place in the B final so he received the bronze medal.

Four years later he won the gold medal with the Canadian team in the 5000 metre relay competition.

He was also training Francois Hamelin.
