= Orazio Fagone =

Italian short-track speed skater and wheelchair curler

- Curler ♂
- Born: 13 November 1968 (age 58); Catania, Italy

Curling career
- Member Association: Italy
- World Wheelchair Championship: 2 (2004, 2005)
Medal record
Men's short track speed skating
Representing Italy
Olympic Games
Gold medal – first place	1994 Lillehammer	5000 m relay
Olympic Games (Demonstration)
Bronze medal – third place	1988 Calgary	1500m
Silver medal – second place	1988 Calgary	5000 m relay
World Championships
Gold medal – first place	1994 Guildford	3000 m
Gold medal – first place	1988 St. Louis	5000 m relay
Gold medal – first place	1996 Den Haag	500 m
Gold medal – first place	1996 Den Haag	5000 m relay
Silver medal – second place	1987 Montreal	1000 m
Silver medal – second place	1987 Montreal	5000 m relay
Silver medal – second place	1993 Beijing	5000 m relay
Silver medal – second place	1995 Gjøvik	5000 m relay
Silver medal – second place	1997 Nagano	1500 m
Bronze medal – third place	1990 Amsterdam	500 m
Bronze medal – third place	1996 Den Haag	Overall
Bronze medal – third place	1997 Nagano	5000 m relay
World Team Championships
Gold medal – first place	1993 Budapest	Team
Silver medal – second place	1992 Minamimaki	Team
Bronze medal – third place	1994 Cambridge	Team
Bronze medal – third place	1996 Lake Placid	Team
Bronze medal – third place	1997 Seoul	Team
European Championships
Bronze medal – third place	1997 Malmö	5000 m relay

Orazio Fagone (born 13 November 1968) is an Italian sledge hockey player and former short track speed skater who competed in the 1988 Winter Olympics, 1992 Winter Olympics and 1994 Winter Olympics. After a motorcycle accident, he also competed as paralympic hockey player and wheelchair curler.

== Short track career ==
Fagone competed in the first short track speed skating events at the 1988 Winter Olympics when this sport was a demonstration sport. He finished third in the 1500 metres and as a member of the Italian relay team, he finished second in the 5000 metre relay.

At the 1992 Winter Olympics in Albertville, Fagone finished eighth with the Italian team in the 5000 metre relay competition. In the 1000 metres, he finished 24th.

At the 1994 Winter Olympics in Lillehammer, Fagone was part of the Italian team which won the gold medal in the 5000 metre relay competition. In the 1000 metres, he finished 15th and in the 500 metres, he finished 31st.

== Accident ==
In 1997, Fagone's right leg was amputated after a motorcycle accident, ending his hopes for a return to the 1998 Winter Olympics. After the accident, Fagone started to play sledge hockey and competed in the 2006 Winter Paralympics as a member of the Italian national sledge hockey team. This made Fagone the third Winter Olympian to also compete in the Paralympics and the first disabled one (the other two were sighted guides).

== Wheelchair curling teams and events ==
Season	Skip	Third	Second	Lead	Alternate	Coach	Events
2003–04	Egidio Marchese	Orazio Fagone	Rita Dal Monte	Fabio Tripodi	Pierino Gaspard	Mauro Maino	WWhCC 2004 (6th)
2004–05	Egidio Marchese	Orazio Fagone	Lucrezia Celentano	Danilo Destro	Pierino Gaspard	Mauro Maino	WWhCC 2005 (9th)

== See also ==
- List of athletes who have competed in the Paralympics and Olympics
