= Chae Ji-hoon =

South Korean speed skater (born 1974)

Personal information
- Born: March 5, 1974 (age 52)

Sport
- Country: South Korea
- Sport: Short track speed skating
Medal record
Men's short track speed skating
Representing South Korea
Olympic Games
Gold medal – first place	1994 Lillehammer	500 m
Silver medal – second place	1994 Lillehammer	1000 m
Silver medal – second place	1998 Nagano	5000 m relay
World Championships
Gold medal – first place	1993 Beijing	3000m
Gold medal – first place	1994 Guildford	1500m
Gold medal – first place	1995 Gjøvik	1500m
Gold medal – first place	1995 Gjøvik	500m
Gold medal – first place	1995 Gjøvik	3000m
Gold medal – first place	1995 Gjøvik	Overall
Gold medal – first place	1996 Den Haag	3000m
Silver medal – second place	1994 Guildford	3000m
Silver medal – second place	1994 Guildford	Overall
Silver medal – second place	1996 Den Haag	Overall
Silver medal – second place	1998 Vienna	5000m relay
Bronze medal – third place	1993 Beijing	1500m
Bronze medal – third place	1993 Beijing	Overall
Bronze medal – third place	1996 Den Haag	1500m
Bronze medal – third place	1996 Den Haag	1000m
Bronze medal – third place	1996 Den Haag	5000m relay
Winter Universiade
Gold medal – first place	1995 Jaca	1500 m
Gold medal – first place	1995 Jaca	1000 m
Gold medal – first place	1995 Jaca	3000 m
Gold medal – first place	1995 Jaca	5000 m relay
Gold medal – first place	1997 Muju	5000 m relay
Asian Winter Games
Gold medal – first place	1996 Harbin	1000 m
Gold medal – first place	1996 Harbin	3000 m
Gold medal – first place	1996 Harbin	5000 m relay
Silver medal – second place	1996 Harbin	1500 m

- Chae Ji-hoon
- Hangul: 채지훈
- Hanja: 蔡智薰
- RR: Chae Jihun
- MR: Ch'ae Chihun

Chae Ji-hoon (Korean: 채지훈; Hanja: 蔡智薰; born 5 March 1974) is a retired South Korean short-track speed skater.

== Skating career ==
Chae won a gold medal in the 500 m and a silver medal in 1000 m at the 1994 Winter Olympics in Lillehammer. He is the 1995 Overall World Champion. He then won a silver medal in 5000 m relay at the 1998 Winter Olympics in Nagano.
