= Won Hye-kyung =

Short track speed skater

Medal record

Women's short track speed skating

Representing South Korea

Olympic Games
Gold medal – first place	1998 Nagano	3000 m relay
Gold medal – first place	1994 Lillehammer	3000 m relay
Bronze medal – third place	1998 Nagano	1000 m

World Championships
Gold medal – first place	1996 The Hague	3000 m
Silver medal – second place	1998 Vienna	3000 m relay
Silver medal – second place	1997 Nagano	1000 m
Silver medal – second place	1997 Nagano	1500 m
Silver medal – second place	1997 Nagano	3000 m
Silver medal – second place	1997 Nagano	3000 m relay
Silver medal – second place	1996 The Hague	Overall
Silver medal – second place	1996 The Hague	1500 m
Silver medal – second place	1995 Gjovik	3000 m relay
Bronze medal – third place	1997 Nagano	Overall
Bronze medal – third place	1994 Guildford	3000 m relay

World Team Championships
Gold medal – first place	1997 Seoul	Team
Gold medal – first place	1996 Lake Placid	Team
Gold medal – first place	1995 Zoetermeer	Team
Silver medal – second place	1998 Bormio	Team
Silver medal – second place	1994 Cambridge	Team

World Junior Championships
Gold medal – first place	1997 Marquette	Overall
Silver medal – second place	1995 Calgary	Overall
Silver medal – second place	1994 Seoul	Overall

Asian Winter Games
Silver medal – second place	1996 Harbin	1000 m
Silver medal – second place	1996 Harbin	3000 m
Silver medal – second place	1996 Harbin	3000 m relay

Won Hye-Kyung (Korean: 원혜경; Hanja: 元蕙敬, born 14 October 1979) is a South Korean short track speed skater, who won medals in the 1000 m and 3000 m relay at the 1998 Winter Olympics. She had already won a relay gold medal at the 1994 Winter Olympics, at the age of 14.
