= Frédéric Blackburn =

Short-track speed skater

Medal record

Men's short track speed skating

Representing Canada

Olympic Games
Silver medal – second place	1992 Albertville	1000 m
Silver medal – second place	1992 Albertville	5000 m relay

World Championships
Gold medal – first place	1994 Guildford	500m
Gold medal – first place	1995 Gjøvik	5000 m relay
Silver medal – second place	1990 Amsterdam	5000 m relay
Silver medal – second place	1994 Guildford	Overall
Silver medal – second place	1994 Guildford	1000m
Silver medal – second place	1996 Hague	5000 m relay
Silver medal – second place	1995 Gjøvik	1000m
Bronze medal – third place	1994 Guildford	5000 m relay
Bronze medal – third place	1995 Gjøvik	3000m
Bronze medal – third place	1995 Gjøvik	Overall
Bronze medal – third place	1996 Hague	500m

Frédéric Blackburn (born December 21, 1972, in Chicoutimi, Quebec) is a Canadian short track speed skater who competed in the 1992 Winter Olympics and in the 1994 Winter Olympics.

In 1992 he won a silver medal in the 1000 metre short track event. He was also a member of the Canadian relay team which won the silver medal in the 5000 metre relay competition.

Two years later he finished fifth in the 500 m event and eighth in the 1000 m competition. He was also a member of the Canadian relay team which finished fourth in the 5000 metre relay contest.
