= Sylvie Daigle =

Canadian speed skater

Medal record

Women's short track speed skating

Representing Canada

Olympic Games
Gold medal – first place	1992 Albertville	3000 m relay
Silver medal – second place	1994 Lillehammer	3000 m relay

World Championships
Gold medal – first place	1990 Amsterdam	Overall
Gold medal – first place	1989 Solihull	Overall
Gold medal – first place	1988 St. Louis	Overall
Gold medal – first place	1983 Tokyo	Overall
Gold medal – first place	1979 Québec	Overall
Silver medal – second place	1991 Sydney	Overall
Silver medal – second place	1984 Peterborough	Overall
Bronze medal – third place	1982 Halifax	Overall

Sylvie Daigle (born December 1, 1962) is a Canadian speed skater. She is a member of the Canadian short track relay team that won gold at the 1992 Winter Olympics and silver at the 1994 Winter Olympics. She is also a five-time Overall World Champion (for 1979, 1983, 1988–1990). She was born in Sherbrooke, Quebec.

== Career ==
First competing in 1979, she has participated, and triumphed, in long-track events during the Canada Winter Games that year, winning gold in the 500-metre, 1000-metre and 1500-metre competitions. The following year in Lake Placid at the 1980 Winter Olympics, Sylvie Daigle finished 19th in the 500-metre.

At Sarajevo in the 1984 Winter Olympics, she was 20th in the 500-metre, 25th in the 1000-metre and 22nd in the 1500-metre. A pair of operations in 1985 and 1987, aimed at relieving the pain in her knees, led her to re-direct her career. Consequently, in 1987, she decided to devote herself to short-track speed skating (having won the Overall Short-track World Championships in 1979 and in 1983), which was introduced the following year as a demonstration sport at the 1988 Winter Olympics in Calgary. There, Sylvie won a gold in the 1500-metre, silver in the 1000-metre and 3000-metre, and bronze in the 500-metre and 3000-metre relay. Daigle re-claimed the Overall World Championship after 5-year hiatus in 1988 and defended the title in 1989 and in 1990, becoming the first person to have won five Overall World Titles, including three consecutive titles. (Two other athletes have equalled her number of World Titles since.)

At the 1992 Winter Olympics in Albertville, short-track speed skating was an officially registered sport. There, Sylvie won the gold medal in the 3000-metre relay, but finished in 18th place in the 500-metre after a collision with American skater Cathy Turner during the preliminary round.

Following the Albertville Games, she started medical studies at the Université de Montréal, but suspended it to resume her training, with the goal of participating in the 1994 Winter Olympics in Lillehammer. There, she won a silver medal.

Daigle left the world of skating following the Lillehammer Games in order to finish her studies, obtaining a medical degree from the Université de Montréal in 1998.

== Titles ==
- All-Around World Champion in 1979, 1983, 1988, 1989, 1990, becoming the first five-time Overall Short track World Champion, and the first person to have won three World Championships consecutively. In 1983 World Championships, Daigle became the first person to have won all six gold medals available (Overall, 500m, 1000m, 1500m, 3000m, 3000m relay), though World Championship Titles were not awarded for relays in 1983.
- Ten-time Canadian National Champion

== Awards ==
- Elaine Tanner (best Canadian junior athlete): 1979, 1983
- Female Athlete of the Year (Canadian Speed Skating Association): 1988, 1989, 1991
- Velma Springstead Trophy: 1990
- Olympic Hall of Fame: 1991
