= Isabelle Charest =

Canadian short-track speed skater and politician

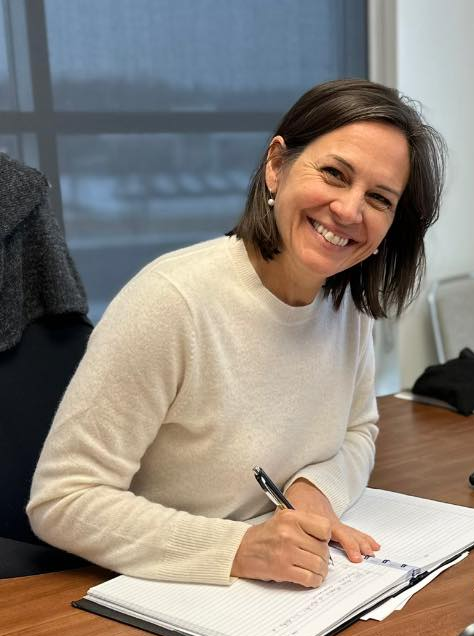
- Charest in 2023

Member of the National Assembly of Quebec for Brome-Missisquoi
- In office October 1, 2018 – August 27, 2026
- Preceded by: Pierre Paradis
- Succeeded by: Fred Beauchemin

Personal details
- Born: January 3, 1971 (age 55) Rimouski, Quebec, Canada
- Party: Coalition Avenir Québec
- Profession: Athlete
- Sports career
Medal record
Women's short track speed skating
Representing Canada
Olympic Games
Silver medal – second place	1994 Lillehammer	3000 m relay
Bronze medal – third place	1998 Nagano	3000 m relay
Bronze medal – third place	2002 Salt Lake City	3000 m relay
World Championships
Gold medal – first place	1996 The Hague	500 m
Gold medal – first place	1997 Nagano	500 m
Gold medal – first place	1997 Nagano	3000 m relay
Silver medal – second place	1996 The Hague	1000 m
Bronze medal – third place	1996 The Hague	Overall
World Team Championships
Silver medal – second place	1999 St Louis	Team
Bronze medal – third place	1998 Bormio	Team

Isabelle Charest (born January 3, 1971) is a Canadian athlete and politician. A short track speed skater who competed in the 1994 Winter Olympics, the 1998 Winter Olympics, and the 2002 Winter Olympics, she was elected to the National Assembly of Quebec in the 2018 provincial election as a member of the Coalition Avenir Québec.

== Sports ==
In 1994, she was a member of the Canadian relay team which won the silver medal in the 3000 metre relay competition. In the 1000 m event she finished sixth and in the 500 m contest she finished seventh.

Four years later, she won the bronze medal with the Canadian team in the 3000 metre relay competition. In the 500 m event as well as in the 1000 m contest she finished seventh.

At the 2002 Games she won her second bronze medal with the Canadian relay team in the 3000 metre relay competition. In the 500 m event she finished fourth.

Charest was the Chef de Mission for Team Canada at the 2018 Winter Olympics.

== Politics ==
She was elected to the National Assembly of Quebec in 2018 and was re-elected in 2022.

In February 2019, Charest was criticized by members of the Quebec Liberal Party over comments she made calling hijabs a symbol of oppression. She said that wearing a hijab does not correspond to Quebec values and keeps women from flourishing. "For me, the hijab is not something women should be wearing because it does have, at some point, significance of oppression of women and the fact they have to cover themselves," she said.

She did not seek re-election in the 2026 general election.

== Electoral record ==
2022 Quebec general election: Brome-Missisquoi
Party	Candidate	Votes	%	±%
Coalition Avenir Québec	Isabelle Charest	20,576	45.87	+1.49
Québec solidaire	Alexandre Legault	7,318	15.91	-1.37
Parti Québécois	Guillaume Paquet	5,359	11.95	+1.23
Liberal	Claude Vadeboncoeur	5,344	11.91	-12.29
Conservative	Stéphanie Prévost	4,875	10.87	–
Canadian	Lynn Moore	642	1.43	–
Green	Caitlin Moynan	487	1.09	-1.27
Independent	Sébastien Houle	209	0.47	–
Climat Québec	Tommy Quirion-Bouchard	121	0.27	–
Démocratie directe	Pierre Fontaine	105	0.23	–
Total valid votes		44,856	98.82	–
Total rejected ballots		537	1.18	–
Turnout		45,393	67.99	
Electors on the lists		66,769		
