= Nathalie Lambert =

Short track speed skater

Medal record

Women's short track speed skating

Representing Canada

Olympic Games
Gold medal – first place	1992 Albertville	3000m relay
Silver medal – second place	1994 Lillehammer	1000m
Silver medal – second place	1994 Lillehammer	3000m relay

World Championships
Gold medal – first place	1986 Chamonix	3000m relay
Gold medal – first place	1987 Montreal	3000m relay
Gold medal – first place	1988 St. Louis	3000m relay
Gold medal – first place	1989 Solihull	3000m relay
Gold medal – first place	1990 Amsterdam	3000m relay
Gold medal – first place	1991 Sydney	1500m
Gold medal – first place	1991 Sydney	1000m
Gold medal – first place	1991 Sydney	3000m
Gold medal – first place	1991 Sydney	Overall
Gold medal – first place	1991 Sydney	3000m relay
Gold medal – first place	1992 Denver	3000m relay
Gold medal – first place	1993 Beijing	Overall
Gold medal – first place	1993 Beijing	3000m relay
Gold medal – first place	1994 Guildford	Overall
Gold medal – first place	1994 Guildford	3000m relay
Gold medal – first place	1997 Nagano	3000m relay
Silver medal – second place	1986 Chamonix	Overall
Silver medal – second place	1987 Montreal	Overall
Bronze medal – third place	1984 Peterborough	Overall
Bronze medal – third place	1985 Amsterdam	Overall

Nathalie Brigitte Lambert, OC (born December 1, 1963, in Montreal, Quebec) is a Canadian Olympic medalist in short-track speed skating. She won one Gold medal and two Silver medals at the Winter Olympics, and was Canada's flag bearer at the 1992 Albertville Olympics closing ceremony. She is also a three-time Overall World Champion for 1991, 1993 and 1994.

Lambert won the 11 international competitions in which she participated, between 1992 and 1994. She won the all-around world championship three times: in 1991, 1993 and 1994. In 1991 she dethroned her legendary teammate, the 5 time overall World Champion Sylvie Daigle, whom she had been chasing for years, and often finished 2nd to.

Despite it not typically being her best event she was one of the gold medal favorites for the 500 metre gold at the 1992 Olympics and then became the favorite after fellow leading contenders- her teammate Sylvie Daigle and Zhang Yanmei of China both were eliminated in the heats. Unfortunately she had a fall in the semis when she got caught up with Yan Li of China, and as a result did not make the final. She rebounded from the disappointment to lead the Canadian team to gold in the relay. In 1994 she went in as the favorite in both the 500 and 1000 metres but again fell in the semis of the 500, and was just nipped for the 1000 metre gold in the last lap by Chun Lee Kyung of Korea (the winner of the next 3 world overall titles, and a 4 time Olympic Gold medalist), settling for silver. She added another silver in the relay, after the Chinese team which finished 2nd was disqualified.

After retiring, she made a comeback to the sport in 1997, and performed respectably at the 1997 World Short Track Championships. She seemed to be on pace for a place on the 1998 Canadian Olympic team, but an injury took her out of the running.

Despite her failure to win an individual Olympic gold medal, Natalie is regarded by many as one of the best short track speed skaters in history. She was most well known for her burst of speeds and power, as well as her technical brilliance, and her longevity as a top competitor reached rare heights in the sport.

On June 30, 2016, Lambert was made an Officer of the Order of Canada by Governor General David Johnston. Her citation read: "For her achievements in Olympic Sport and for her tremendous contributions to athletics in Canada as a renowned mentor and spokesperson."

== Records ==
- 1985 - World championship, Amsterdam (Netherland) - 1000 m : 1m43s.58
- 1987 - World championship, Montréal (Quebec) - 3000 m : 5m31s.65
- 1993 - International Competition, Hamar (Norway) - 1000 m : 1m34s.07
- 1993 - World championship, Beijing (China) - relay 3000 m : 4m26s.56

== Awards ==
- 1992 - Inducted into the Canadian Olympic Committee Hall of Fame
- 1994 - Named Athlete of the Year by the 'Mérite Sportif Québécois'
- From 1985 to 1987 and 1990 to 1994. Named Athlete of the Year by the Canadian Speed Skating Association
- 2001 - Inducted into Quebec's Sports Hall of Fame
- 2002 - Inducted into Canada's Sports Hall of Fame

== Personal life ==
Lambert is currently married to Daniel Gaudette, a physical education teacher, and adopted two daughters from China.
