= Kim So-hee (speed skater) =

South Korean skater (born 1976)

Medal record

Women's short track speed skating

Representing South Korea

Olympic Games
Gold medal – first place	1994 Lillehammer	3000m relay
Bronze medal – third place	1994 Lillehammer	1000m

World Championships
Gold medal – first place	1992 Denver	Overall
Silver medal – second place	1994 Guildford	Overall

Asian Winter Games
Gold medal – first place	1990 Sapporo	1500 m
Silver medal – second place	1990 Sapporo	3000 m relay
Silver medal – second place	1996 Harbin	3000 m relay

Kim So-Hee (Korean: 김소희; Hanja: 金昭希; born September 16, 1976) is a retired female South Korean short track speed skater who competed in the 1992 Winter Olympics and in the 1994 Winter Olympics. She won one gold medal and one bronze medal from the Olympics. She is the 1992 overall world champion for short-track speed skating, and is the first woman from South Korea to have become one.

She was born in Daegu, South Korea. In 1992, she finished ninth in the 500 m competition.

Two years later she was a member of the Korean relay team which won the gold medal in the 3000 m relay event. In the 1000 m discipline she won the bronze medal and in the 500 m competition she finished fifth.

Kim retired soon after 1997 Winter Universiade, where she won Gold medal for 1000m Short-track speed skating.
