= List of Olympic medalists in short-track speed skating =

Short-track speed skating is a sport that is contested at the Winter Olympic Games. The first Winter Olympics, held in 1924, included speed skating, but the first official short-track speed skating events were not held until the 1992 Winter Olympics in Albertville, France. Before 1992, short-track speed skating events were held at the 1988 Winter Olympics as a demonstration sport. At those games, events for both men and women were held in five disciplines: 500-metre, 1000-metre, 1500-metre, 3000-metre and the relay (3000 metres for women, 5000 metres for men). The Netherlands, United Kingdom and South Korea won two gold medals each, with Canada, Italy, Japan and China picking up a gold medal each. The results of those demonstration events are not considered official and are not included in this list. At the 1992 Winter Olympics, there were four medal events: men's 1000 metres, men's 5000-metre relay, women's 500 metres and women's 3000-metre relay. Men's 500 metres and women's 1000 metres were added in 1994. The men's and women's 1500 metres were added in 2002 and these eight events have been held at every Olympic Games since. In 2022, a ninth event was added to the program: the mixed 2000-metre relay.

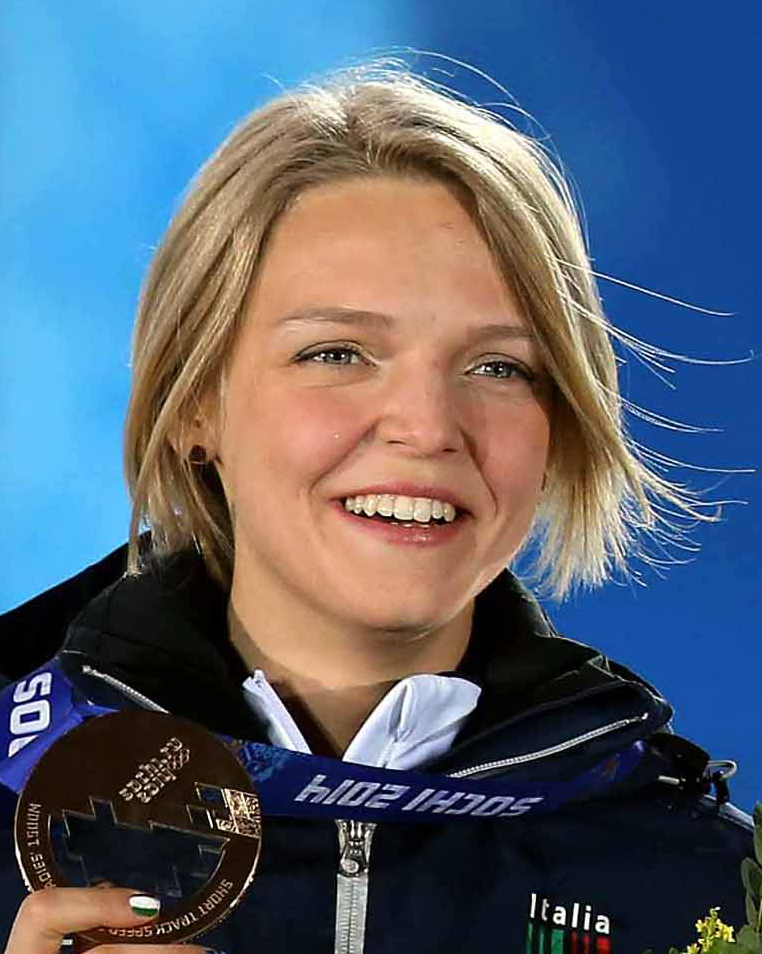
Arianna Fontana won 14 Olympic medals in short track.

Arianna Fontana of Italy is the most decorated short-tracker in Olympic history, having won thirteen medals, including two gold medals, four silver medals, and five bronze medals. Viktor An of Russia, formerly of South Korea with his birth name of Ahn Hyun-soo, is the most decorated male short-tracker in Olympic history, having won eight medals including six gold medals and two bronze. Apolo Ohno of the United States also has eight Olympic medals (two gold, two silver, four bronze). Tania Vicent of Canada is the oldest athlete to medal; she was 34 in 2010 when she won a silver medal in the 3000-metre relay. Kim Yoon-Mi of South Korea is the youngest; she was 13 when she won a gold in the same event in 1994.

At the 1992 Winter Olympics, South Korea's Kim Ki-hoon became the first short-track speed skater to win two gold medals, by winning gold medals in both of the available events (1000 m, 5000 m relay). In 1994 Kim (1000 m) and American Cathy Turner (500 m) became the first to successfully defend their respective Olympic title; Kim thus became the first short-tracker to win three Olympic gold medals. In 1998, Chun and Yang Yang (S) of China became the first short-tracker to win three medals in one Olympic. By helping South Korea to defend 3000 m relay title as well as defending her 1000 m gold medal, Chun became the first (and thus far, only) athlete to successfully defend two Olympic titles. In 2006, South Korea's Jin Sun-Yu and then Ahn Hyun-Soo became the first two short-trackers to have won three gold medals in one Olympic. Ahn also won a bronze medal in the same Games, becoming the first (and thus far, only) short-tracker to win four medals in one Olympic; he repeated the same feat in 2014. In 2010, Wang Meng became the first athlete to have won three individual gold medals in the sport, and in 2014 Ahn became the first to have won four individual gold medals, and six gold medals overall in the sport. South Korean short-track speed skaters have won a combined 49 medals, including 25 golds, more than any other nation in both measures. South Korea is also the only country to have won at least one gold medal at every Olympics in which short-track speed skating has been held; Canada and China share with South Korea the honour of being the only nations to have athletes win a medal at every Olympics in the sport. As of the 2018 Winter Olympics, 192 medals (64 of each color) have been awarded and have been won by short-track speed skaters from 14 National Olympic Committees (NOC).

== Men ==
=== 500 metres ===
Games	Gold	Silver	Bronze
1994 Lillehammer	Chae Ji-Hoon; South Korea	Mirko Vuillermin; Italy	Nicky Gooch; Great Britain
1998 Nagano	Takafumi Nishitani; Japan	An Yulong; China	Hitoshi Uematsu; Japan
2002 Salt Lake City	Marc Gagnon; Canada	Jonathan Guilmette; Canada	Rusty Smith; United States
2006 Turin	Apolo Anton Ohno; United States	François-Louis Tremblay; Canada	Ahn Hyun-Soo; South Korea
2010 Vancouver	Charles Hamelin; Canada	Sung Si-Bak; South Korea	François-Louis Tremblay; Canada
2014 Sochi	Viktor An; Russia	Wu Dajing; China	Charle Cournoyer; Canada
2018 PyeongChang	Wu Dajing; China	Hwang Dae-heon; South Korea	Lim Hyo-jun; South Korea
2022 Beijing	Shaoang Liu; Hungary	Konstantin Ivliev; ROC	Steven Dubois; Canada
2026 Milan Cortina	Steven Dubois; Canada	Melle van 't Wout; Netherlands	Jens van 't Wout; Netherlands

Medals
Rank	Nation	Gold	Silver	Bronze	Total
1	Canada	3	2	3	8
2	South Korea	1	2	2	5
3	China	1	2	0	3
4	Japan	1	0	1	2
4	United States	1	0	1	2
6	Netherlands	0	1	1	2
7	Hungary	1	0	0	1
7	Russia	1	0	0	1
8	Italy	0	1	0	1
8	ROC (ROC)	0	1	0	1
10	Great Britain	0	0	1	1
Total	11 nations	9	9	9	27

=== 1000 metres ===
Games	Gold	Silver	Bronze
1992 Albertville	Kim Ki-hoon; South Korea	Frédéric Blackburn; Canada	Lee Joon-Ho; South Korea
1994 Lillehammer	Kim Ki-hoon; South Korea	Chae Ji-Hoon; South Korea	Marc Gagnon; Canada
1998 Nagano	Kim Dong-Sung; South Korea	Li Jiajun; China	Éric Bédard; Canada
2002 Salt Lake City	Steven Bradbury; Australia	Apolo Anton Ohno; United States	Mathieu Turcotte; Canada
2006 Turin	Ahn Hyun-Soo; South Korea	Lee Ho-Suk; South Korea	Apolo Anton Ohno; United States
2010 Vancouver	Lee Jung-Su; South Korea	Lee Ho-Suk; South Korea	Apolo Anton Ohno; United States
2014 Sochi	Viktor Ahn; Russia	Vladimir Grigorev; Russia	Sjinkie Knegt; Netherlands
2018 PyeongChang	Samuel Girard; Canada	John-Henry Krueger; United States	Seo Yi-ra; South Korea
2022 Beijing	Ren Ziwei; China	Li Wenlong; China	Shaoang Liu; Hungary
2026 Milano Cortina	Jens van 't Wout; Netherlands	Sun Long; China	Rim Jong-un; South Korea

Medals
Rank	Nation	Gold	Silver	Bronze	Total
1	South Korea	5	3	3	11
2	China	1	3	0	4
3	Canada	1	1	3	5
4	Russia	1	1	0	2
5	Netherlands	1	0	1	2
6	Australia	1	0	0	1
7	United States	0	2	2	4
8	Hungary	0	0	1	1
Total	8 nations	10	10	10	30

=== 1500 metres ===
Games	Gold	Silver	Bronze
2002 Salt Lake City	Apolo Anton Ohno; United States	Li Jiajun; China	Marc Gagnon; Canada
2006 Turin	Ahn Hyun-Soo; South Korea	Lee Ho-Suk; South Korea	Li Jiajun; China
2010 Vancouver	Lee Jung-Su; South Korea	Apolo Anton Ohno; United States	J. R. Celski; United States
2014 Sochi	Charles Hamelin; Canada	Han Tianyu; China	Viktor An; Russia
2018 PyeongChang	Lim Hyo-jun; South Korea	Sjinkie Knegt; Netherlands	Semion Elistratov; Olympic Athletes from Russia
2022 Beijing	Hwang Dae-heon; South Korea	Steven Dubois; Canada	Semion Elistratov; ROC
2026 Milano Cortina	Jens van 't Wout; Netherlands	Hwang Dae-heon; South Korea	Roberts Krūzbergs; Latvia

Medals
Rank	Nation	Gold	Silver	Bronze	Total
1	South Korea	4	2	0	6
2	United States	1	1	1	3
2	Canada	1	1	1	3
4	Netherlands	1	1	0	2
5	China	0	2	1	3
6	Latvia	0	0	1	1
6	Olympic Athletes from Russia	0	0	1	1
6	Russia	0	0	1	1
6	ROC	0	0	1	1
Total	9 nations	7	7	7	21

=== 5000-metre relay ===
Games	Gold	Silver	Bronze
1992 Albertville	South Korea; Kim Ki-hoon; Lee Joon-Ho; Mo Ji-Soo; Song Jae-Kun	Canada; Frédéric Blackburn; Laurent Daignault; Michel Daignault; Sylvain Gagnon; Mark Lackie	Japan; Yuichi Akasaka; Tatsuyoshi Ishihara; Toshinobu Kawai; Tsutomu Kawasaki
1994 Lillehammer	Italy; Maurizio Carnino; Orazio Fagone; Hugo Herrnhof; Mirko Vuillermin	United States; Randy Bartz; John Coyle; Eric Flaim; Andrew Gabel	Australia; Steven Bradbury; Kieran Hansen; Andrew Murtha; Richard Nizielski
1998 Nagano	Canada; Éric Bédard; Derrick Campbell; François Drolet; Marc Gagnon	South Korea; Chae Ji-Hoon; Lee Jun-Hwan; Lee Ho-Eung; Kim Dong-Sung	China; Li Jiajun; Feng Kai; Yuan Ye; An Yulong
2002 Salt Lake City	Canada; Éric Bédard; Marc Gagnon; Jonathan Guilmette; François-Louis Tremblay; Mathieu Turcotte	Italy; Michele Antonioli; Maurizio Carnino; Fabio Carta; Nicola Franceschina; Nicola Rodigari	China; An Yulong; Feng Kai; Guo Wei; Li Jiajun; Li Ye
2006 Turin	South Korea; Ahn Hyun-Soo; Lee Ho-Suk; Oh Se-Jong; Seo Ho-Jin; Song Suk-Woo	Canada; Éric Bédard; Jonathan Guilmette; Charles Hamelin; François-Louis Tremblay; Mathieu Turcotte	United States; Alex Izykowski; J. P. Kepka; Apolo Anton Ohno; Rusty Smith
2010 Vancouver	Canada; Charles Hamelin; François Hamelin; Olivier Jean; François-Louis Tremblay; Guillaume Bastille	South Korea; Kwak Yoon-Gy; Lee Ho-Suk; Lee Jung-Su; Sung Si-Bak; Kim Seoung-Il	United States; J. R. Celski; Travis Jayner; Jordan Malone; Apolo Anton Ohno; Simon Cho
2014 Sochi	Russia; Viktor An; Semion Elistratov; Vladimir Grigorev; Ruslan Zakharov	United States; Eddy Alvarez; J. R. Celski; Christopher Creveling; Jordan Malone	China; Chen Dequan; Han Tianyu; Shi Jingnan; Wu Dajing
2018 PyeongChang	Hungary; Shaoang Liu; Shaolin Sándor Liu; Viktor Knoch; Csaba Burján	China; Wu Dajing; Han Tianyu; Chen Dequan; Xu Hongzhi; Ren Ziwei	Canada; Samuel Girard; Charles Hamelin; Charle Cournoyer; Pascal Dion
2022 Beijing	Canada; Charles Hamelin; Steven Dubois; Pascal Dion; Jordan Pierre-Gilles; Maxime Laoun	South Korea; Lee June-seo; Hwang Dae-heon; Kwak Yoon-gy; Park Jang-hyuk; Kim Dong-wook	Italy; Pietro Sighel; Yuri Confortola; Tommaso Dotti; Andrea Cassinelli
2026 Milano Cortina	Netherlands; Teun Boer; Friso Emons; Jens van 't Wout; Melle van 't Wout; Itzhak de Laat^{[a]}	South Korea; Hwang Dae-heon; Lee Jeong-min; Lee June-seo; Rim Jong-un; Shin Dong-min	Italy; Pietro Sighel; Thomas Nadalini; Luca Spechenhauser; Andrea Cassinelli

Medals
Rank	Nation	Gold	Silver	Bronze	Total
1	Canada	4	2	1	7
2	South Korea	2	3	0	5
3	Italy	1	1	1	3
4	Hungary	1	0	0	1
4	Russia	1	0	0	1
6	United States	0	2	2	4
7	China	0	1	3	4
8	Australia	0	0	1	1
8	Japan	0	0	1	1
Total	9 nations	9	9	9	27

== Women ==
=== 500 metres ===
Games	Gold	Silver	Bronze
1992 Albertville	Cathy Turner; United States	Li Yan; China	Hwang Ok-Sil; North Korea
1994 Lillehammer	Cathy Turner; United States	Zhang Yanmei; China	Amy Peterson; United States
1998 Nagano	Annie Perreault; Canada	Yang Yang (S); China	Chun Lee-Kyung; South Korea
2002 Salt Lake City	Yang Yang (A); China	Evgenia Radanova; Bulgaria	Wang Chunlu; China
2006 Turin	Wang Meng; China	Evgenia Radanova; Bulgaria	Anouk Leblanc-Boucher; Canada
2010 Vancouver	Wang Meng; China	Marianne St-Gelais; Canada	Arianna Fontana; Italy
2014 Sochi	Li Jianrou; China	Arianna Fontana; Italy	Park Seung-Hi; South Korea
2018 PyeongChang	Arianna Fontana; Italy	Yara van Kerkhof; Netherlands	Kim Boutin; Canada
2022 Beijing	Arianna Fontana; Italy	Suzanne Schulting; Netherlands	Kim Boutin; Canada
2026 Milano Cortina	Xandra Velzeboer; Netherlands	Arianna Fontana; Italy	Courtney Sarault; Canada

Medals
Rank	Nation	Gold	Silver	Bronze	Total
1	China	4	3	1	8
2	Italy	2	2	1	5
3	United States	2	0	1	3
4	Netherlands	1	2	0	3
5	Canada	1	1	4	6
6	Bulgaria	0	2	0	2
7	South Korea	0	0	2	2
8	North Korea	0	0	1	1
Total	8 nations	10	10	10	30

=== 1000 metres ===
Games	Gold	Silver	Bronze
1994 Lillehammer	Chun Lee-kyung; South Korea	Nathalie Lambert; Canada	Kim So-hui; South Korea
1998 Nagano	Chun Lee-kyung; South Korea	Yang Yang (S); China	Won Hye-kyung; South Korea
2002 Salt Lake City	Yang Yang (A); China	Ko Gi-hyun; South Korea	Yang Yang (S); China
2006 Turin	Jin Sun-yu; South Korea	Wang Meng; China	Yang Yang (A); China
2010 Vancouver	Wang Meng; China	Katherine Reutter; United States	Park Seung-hi; South Korea
2014 Sochi	Park Seung-hi; South Korea	Fan Kexin; China	Shim Suk-hee; South Korea
2018 PyeongChang	Suzanne Schulting; Netherlands	Kim Boutin; Canada	Arianna Fontana; Italy
2022 Beijing	Suzanne Schulting; Netherlands	Choi Min-jeong; South Korea	Hanne Desmet; Belgium
2026 Milano Cortina	Xandra Velzeboer; Netherlands	Courtney Sarault; Canada	Kim Gil-li; South Korea

Medals
Rank	Nation	Gold	Silver	Bronze	Total
1	South Korea	4	2	5	11
2	China	2	3	2	7
3	Netherlands	3	0	0	3
4	Canada	0	3	0	3
5	United States	0	1	0	1
6	Italy	0	0	1	1
6	Belgium	0	0	1	1
Total	7 nations	9	9	9	27

=== 1500 metres ===
Games	Gold	Silver	Bronze
2002 Salt Lake City	Ko Gi-hyun; South Korea	Choi Eun-kyung; South Korea	Evgenia Radanova; Bulgaria
2006 Turin	Jin Sun-yu; South Korea	Choi Eun-kyung; South Korea	Wang Meng; China
2010 Vancouver	Zhou Yang; China	Lee Eun-byul; South Korea	Park Seung-hi; South Korea
2014 Sochi	Zhou Yang; China	Shim Suk-hee; South Korea	Arianna Fontana; Italy
2018 PyeongChang	Choi Min-jeong; South Korea	Li Jinyu; China	Kim Boutin; Canada
2022 Beijing	Choi Min-jeong; South Korea	Arianna Fontana; Italy	Suzanne Schulting; Netherlands
2026 Milano Cortina	Kim Gil-li; South Korea	Choi Min-jeong; South Korea	Corinne Stoddard; United States

Medals
Rank	Nation	Gold	Silver	Bronze	Total
1	South Korea	4	4	1	9
2	China	2	1	1	4
3	Italy	0	1	1	2
4	Bulgaria	0	0	1	1
4	Canada	0	0	1	1
4	Netherlands	0	0	1	1
Total	6 nations	6	6	6	18

=== 3000-metre relay ===
Games	Gold	Silver	Bronze
1992 Albertville	Canada; Angela Cutrone; Sylvie Daigle; Nathalie Lambert; Annie Perreault	United States; Darcie Dohnal; Amy Peterson; Cathy Turner; Nikki Ziegelmeyer	Unified Team; Yuliya Allagulova; Natalya Isakova; Viktoriya Taranina; Yuliya Vlasova
1994 Lillehammer	South Korea; Chun Lee-kyung; Kim So-hui; Kim Yoon-mi; Won Hye-kyung	Canada; Christine Boudrias; Isabelle Charest; Sylvie Daigle; Nathalie Lambert	United States; Karen Cashman; Amy Peterson; Cathy Turner; Nikki Ziegelmeyer
1998 Nagano	South Korea; Chun Lee-kyung; Won Hye-kyung; An Sang-mi; Kim Yun-mi	China; Sun Dandan; Wang Chunlu; Yang Yang (A); Yang Yang (S)	Canada; Christine Boudrias; Isabelle Charest; Annie Perreault; Tania Vicent
2002 Salt Lake City	South Korea; Choi Eun-kyung; Choi Min-kyung; Joo Min-jin; Park Hye-won	China; Sun Dandan; Wang Chunlu; Yang Yang (A); Yang Yang (S)	Canada; Isabelle Charest; Marie-Ève Drolet; Amélie Goulet-Nadon; Alanna Kraus; Tania Vicent
2006 Turin	South Korea; Byun Chun-sa; Choi Eun-kyung; Jeon Da-hye; Jin Sun-yu; Kang Yun-mi	Canada; Alanna Kraus; Anouk Leblanc-Boucher; Amanda Overland; Kalyna Roberge; Tania Vicent	Italy; Marta Capurso; Arianna Fontana; Katia Zini; Mara Zini
2010 Vancouver	China; Sun Linlin; Wang Meng; Zhang Hui; Zhou Yang	Canada; Jessica Gregg; Kalyna Roberge; Marianne St-Gelais; Tania Vicent	United States; Allison Baver; Alyson Dudek; Lana Gehring; Katherine Reutter; Kimberly Derrick
2014 Sochi	South Korea; Shim Suk-hee; Park Seung-hi; Cho Ha-ri; Kim A-lang; Kong Sang-jeong	Canada; Marie-Ève Drolet; Jessica Hewitt; Valérie Maltais; Marianne St-Gelais	Italy; Arianna Fontana; Lucia Peretti; Martina Valcepina; Elena Viviani
2018 PyeongChang	South Korea; Shim Suk-hee; Choi Min-jeong; Kim Ye-jin; Kim A-lang; Lee Yu-bin	Italy; Arianna Fontana; Lucia Peretti; Cecilia Maffei; Martina Valcepina	Netherlands; Suzanne Schulting; Yara van Kerkhof; Lara van Ruijven; Jorien ter Mors
2022 Beijing	Netherlands; Suzanne Schulting; Selma Poutsma; Xandra Velzeboer; Yara van Kerkhof	South Korea; Seo Whi-min; Choi Min-jeong; Kim A-lang; Lee Yu-bin	China; Qu Chunyu; Han Yutong; Fan Kexin; Zhang Yuting; Zhang Chutong
2026 Milano Cortina	South Korea; Choi Min-jeong; Kim Gil-li; Shim Suk-hee; Lee So-yeon; Noh Do-hee	Italy; Elisa Confortola; Arianna Fontana; Chiara Betti; Arianna Sighel	Canada; Danaé Blais; Florence Brunelle; Kim Boutin; Courtney Sarault

Medals
Rank	Nation	Gold	Silver	Bronze	Total
1	South Korea	7	1	0	8
2	Canada	1	4	3	8
3	China	1	2	1	4
4	Netherlands	1	0	1	2
5	Italy	0	2	2	4
5	United States	0	1	2	3
7	Unified Team	0	0	1	1
Total	7 nations	9	9	9	27

== Mixed ==
=== Mixed 2000-metre relay ===
Games	Gold	Silver	Bronze
2022 Beijing	China; Qu Chunyu; Fan Kexin; Wu Dajing; Ren Ziwei; Zhang Yuting^{[a]}	Italy; Arianna Fontana; Martina Valcepina; Pietro Sighel; Andrea Cassinelli; Arianna Valcepina^{[a]} Yuri Confortola^{[a]}	Hungary; Petra Jászapáti; Zsófia Kónya; Shaoang Liu; Shaolin Sándor Liu; John-Henry Krueger^{[a]}
2026 Milano Cortina	Italy; Elisa Confortola; Arianna Fontana; Thomas Nadalini; Pietro Sighel; Chiara Betti^{[a]} Luca Spechenhauser^{[a]}	Canada; Kim Boutin; William Dandjinou; Félix Roussel; Courtney Sarault; Florence Brunelle^{[a]} Steven Dubois^{[a]}	Belgium; Hanne Desmet; Stijn Desmet; Tineke den Dulk; Ward Pétré

^{a} Skaters who did not participate in the final, but received medals

Medals
Rank	Nation	Gold	Silver	Bronze	Total
1	Italy	1	1	0	2
2	China	1	0	0	1
3	Canada	0	1	0	1
4	Belgium	0	0	1	1
4	Hungary	0	0	1	1
Total	5 nations	2	2	2	6

== Statistics ==
At 31 years and 191 days, Vladimir Grigorev became the oldest man to win a short-track Olympic medal, winning silver at the 1000 m event, at the 2014 Olympics on 15 February 2014. On 21 February 2014, he won the gold in the 5000 m relay, upping the oldest male short-track athlete record for both medals and gold medals.

=== Athlete medal leaders ===
Include athletes with at least 3 medals of any colour.

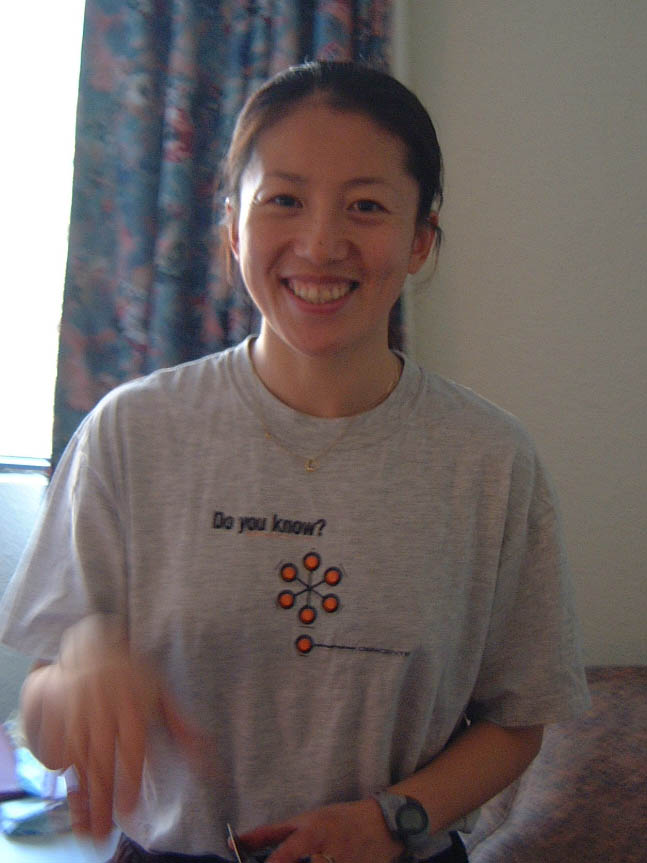
Chinese Yang Yang (A) is one of thirteen athletes to win five or more medals in short-track speed skating.

Athlete	Nation	Olympics	Gold	Silver	Bronze	Total
Arianna Fontana	Italy	2006–2026	3	6	5	14
Ahn Hyun-Soo; Viktor An	South Korea; Russia	2002–2006; 2014	6	0	2	8
Apolo Anton Ohno	United States	2002–2010	2	2	4	8
Choi Min-jeong	South Korea	2018–2026	4	3	0	7
Charles Hamelin	Canada	2006–2022	4	1	1	6
Wang Meng	China	2006–2010	4	1	1	6
Suzanne Schulting	Netherlands	2018–2022	3	1	2	6
Kim Boutin	Canada	2018–2026	0	2	4	6
Chun Lee-Kyung	South Korea	1994–1998	4	0	1	5
Shim Suk-hee	South Korea	2014–2026	3	1	1	5
Marc Gagnon	Canada	1994–2002	3	0	2	5
Wu Dajing	China	2014–2022	2	2	1	5
Yang Yang (A)	China	1998–2006	2	2	1	5
François-Louis Tremblay	Canada	2002–2010	2	2	1	5
Steven Dubois	Canada	2022–2026	2	2	1	5
Park Seung-hi	South Korea	2010–2014	2	0	3	5
Lee Ho-Suk	South Korea	2006–2014	1	4	0	5
Hwang Dae-heon	South Korea	2018–2026	1	4	0	5
Yang Yang (S)	China	1994–2002	0	4	1	5
Li Jiajun	China	1998–2006	0	2	3	5
Jens van 't Wout	Netherlands	2026	3	0	1	4
Choi Eun-Kyung	South Korea	2002–2006	2	2	0	4
Éric Bédard	Canada	1998–2006	2	1	1	4
Cathy Turner	United States	1992–1998	2	1	1	4
Shaoang Liu	Hungary	2018–2022	2	0	2	4
Pietro Sighel	Italy	2022–2026	1	1	2	4
Tania Vicent	Canada	1998–2010	0	2	2	4
Courtney Sarault	Canada	2026	0	2	2	4
Jin Sun-yu	South Korea	2006	3	0	0	3
Zhou Yang	China	2010–2014	3	0	0	3
Kim Ki-hoon	South Korea	1992–1994	3	0	0	3
Xandra Velzeboer	Netherlands	2022–2026	3	0	0	3
Lee Jung-su	South Korea	2010	2	1	0	3
Kim A-lang	South Korea	2014–2022	2	1	0	3
Ren Ziwei	China	2018–2022	2	1	0	3
Annie Perreault	Canada	1992–1998	2	0	1	3
Won Hye-kyung	South Korea	1994–1998	2	0	1	3
Kim Gil-li	South Korea	2026	2	0	1	3
Nathalie Lambert	Canada	1992–1994	1	2	0	3
Chae Ji-hoon	South Korea	1994–1998	1	2	0	3
Fan Kexin	China	2014–2022	1	1	1	3
Yara van Kerkhof	Netherlands	2018–2022	1	1	1	3
Mathieu Turcotte	Canada	2002–2006	1	1	1	3
Semion Elistratov	Russia; Olympic Athletes from Russia; ROC (ROC)	2014–2022	1	0	2	3
Marianne St-Gelais	Canada	2010–2014	0	3	0	3
Wang Chunlu	China	1998–2002	0	2	1	3
Evgenia Radanova	Bulgaria	2002–2006	0	2	1	3
Han Tianyu	China	2014–2018	0	2	1	3
Isabelle Charest	Canada	1994–2002	0	1	2	3
Amy Peterson	United States	1992–1994	0	1	2	3
J. R. Celski	United States	2010–2014	0	1	2	3
Andrea Cassinelli	Italy	2022–2026	0	1	2	3

=== Medals per year ===
Key

- Numbers in **bold** indicate the highest medal count at that year's Olympic Games.

Nation	24–88	92	94	98	02	06	10	14	18	22	26	Total
Australia		–	1	–	1	–	–	–	–	–	–	2
Bulgaria		–	–	–	2	1	–	–	–	–	–	3
Belgium		–	–	–	–	–	–	–	–	1	1	2
Canada		**3**	3	4	6	4	5	3	5	4	5	42
China		1	1	**6**	**7**	5	4	**6**	3	4	1	38
Great Britain		–	1	–	–	–	–	–	–	–	–	1
Hungary		–	–	–	–	–	–	–	1	3	–	4
Italy		–	2	–	1	1	1	3	3	4	4	19
Japan		1	–	2	–	–	–	–	–	–	–	3
Latvia		–	–	–	–	–	–	–	–	–	1	1
Netherlands		–	–	–	–	–	–	1	4	4	7	16
North Korea		1		–		–	–		–			1
Olympic Athletes from Russia									1			1
ROC (ROC)										2		2
Russia		–	–	–	–	–	–	5				5
South Korea		**3**	**6**	**6**	4	**10**	**8**	5	**6**	**5**	7	60
Unified Team		1										1
United States		2	4	–	3	3	6	1	1	–	1	21
