= List of 1992 Winter Olympics medal winners =

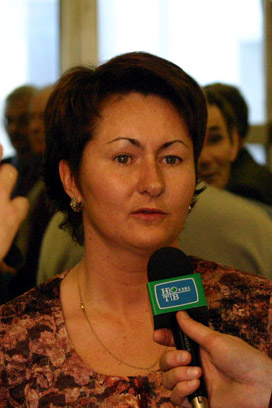
Yelena Välbe won five medals in Albertville.

The 1992 Winter Olympics, officially known by the International Olympic Committee as the XVI Olympic Winter Games, were a multi-sport event held in Albertville, France, from February 8 through February 23, 1992. A total of 1,801 athletes representing 64 National Olympic Committees (NOCs) participated at the Games in 57 events across 12 disciplines.

Two disciplines were contested for medals for the first time after being demonstration sports four years prior in Calgary: freestyle skiing and short track speed skating. In addition, the first women's events were held in biathlon and a pursuit event was added in cross-country skiing for both men and women.

Following the late-1991 dissolution of the Soviet Union, six of the newly independent countries participated together as the Unified Team, the only Winter Olympics at which they would do so. The three Baltic states of Estonia, Latvia, and Lithuania chose to compete independently from the Unified Team. The republics of Croatia and Slovenia made their Olympic debuts, being newly independent from Yugoslavia. Following German reunification, the combined Federal Republic of Germany was represented by one combined team.

Germany was the most successful team at these Olympics, winning 10 gold medals out of 26 total; both were the most of any nation. The Unified Team came in second in both tallies, with 9 golds and 23 total medals – Norway tied the Unified Team with 9 golds, but had only 20 total medals. New Zealand's Annelise Coberger won the country's first Winter Olympics medal, the first by someone representing a Southern Hemisphere nation. Lyubov Yegorova was the most successful athlete, with five medals: three golds and two silvers. Her teammate on the Unified Team and fellow cross-country skier Yelena Välbe also won five medals; she had one gold and four bronze medals. Thirty-eight athletes won more than one medal in Albertville, and twenty NOCs won at least one medal.

== Alpine skiing ==
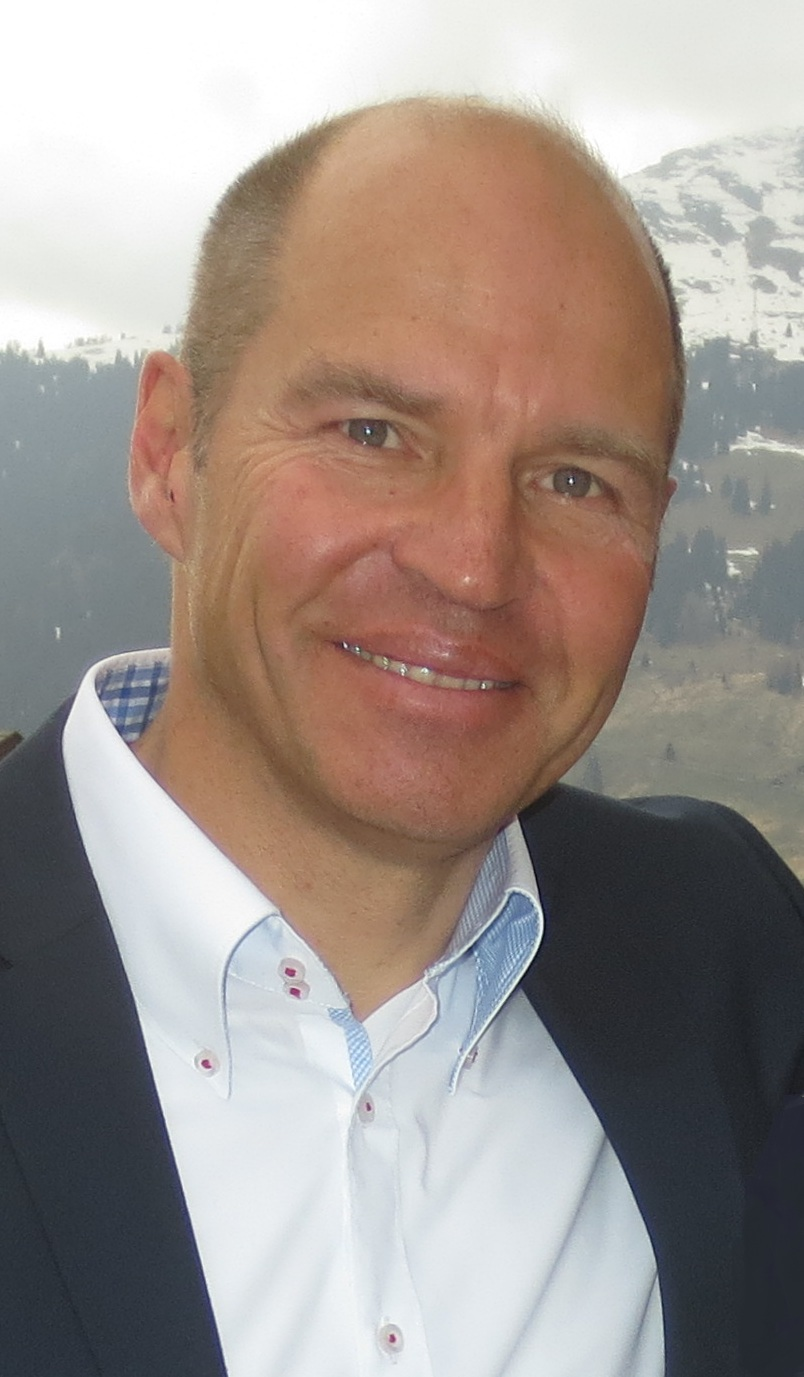
Marc Girardelli of Luxembourg won two silver medals in Albertville.

Event	Gold	Silver	Bronze
Men's downhill	Patrick Ortlieb; Austria	Franck Piccard; France	Günther Mader; Austria
Men's super-G	Kjetil André Aamodt; Norway	Marc Girardelli; Luxembourg	Jan Einar Thorsen; Norway
Men's giant slalom	Alberto Tomba; Italy	Marc Girardelli; Luxembourg	Kjetil André Aamodt; Norway
Men's slalom	Finn Christian Jagge; Norway	Alberto Tomba; Italy	Michael Tritscher; Austria
Men's combined	Josef Polig; Italy	Gianfranco Martin; Italy	Steve Locher; Switzerland
Women's downhill	Kerrin Lee-Gartner; Canada	Hilary Lindh; United States	Veronika Wallinger; Austria
Women's super-G	Deborah Compagnoni; Italy	Carole Merle; France	Katja Seizinger; Germany
Women's giant slalom	Pernilla Wiberg; Sweden	Anita Wachter; Austria Diann Roffe; United States	Not awarded^{[a]}
Women's slalom	Petra Kronberger; Austria	Annelise Coberger; New Zealand	Blanca Fernández Ochoa; Spain
Women's combined	Petra Kronberger; Austria	Anita Wachter; Austria	Florence Masnada; France

== Biathlon ==
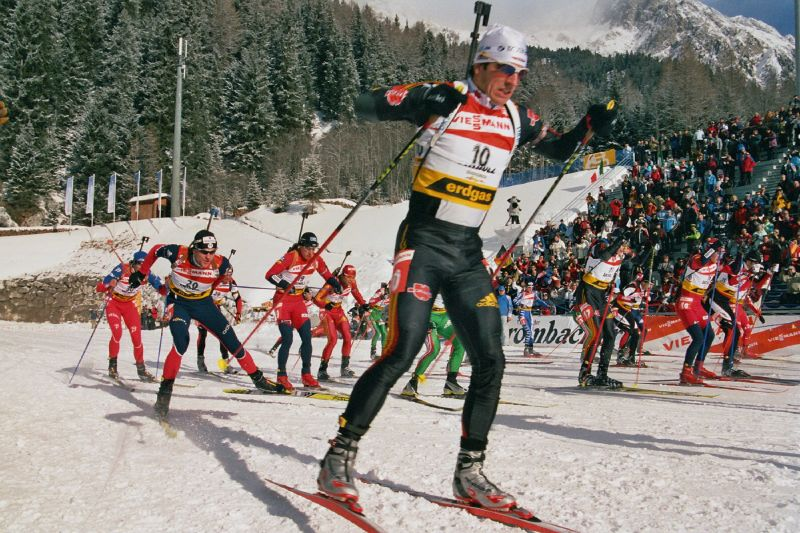
Ricco Groß won the first two of his ultimate eight Olympic medals in Albertville.

Event	Gold	Silver	Bronze
Men's individual	Evgeny Redkin; Unified Team	Mark Kirchner; Germany	Mikael Löfgren; Sweden
Men's sprint	Mark Kirchner; Germany	Ricco Groß; Germany	Harri Eloranta; Finland
Men's relay	Germany; Ricco Groß; Jens Steinigen; Mark Kirchner; Fritz Fischer	Unified Team; Valeriy Medvedtsev; Alexandr Popov; Valeri Kiriyenko; Sergei Tchepikov	Sweden; Ulf Johansson; Leif Andersson; Tord Wiksten; Mikael Löfgren
Women's individual	Antje Misersky-Harvey; Germany	Svetlana Petcherskaia; Unified Team	Myriam Bédard; Canada
Women's sprint	Anfisa Reztsova; Unified Team	Antje Misersky-Harvey; Germany	Elena Belova; Unified Team
Women's relay	France; Corinne Niogret; Véronique Claudel; Anne Briand-Bouthiaux	Germany; Uschi Disl; Antje Misersky-Harvey; Petra Behle-Schaaf	Unified Team; Elena Belova; Anfisa Reztsova; Yelena Melnikova

== Bobsleigh ==
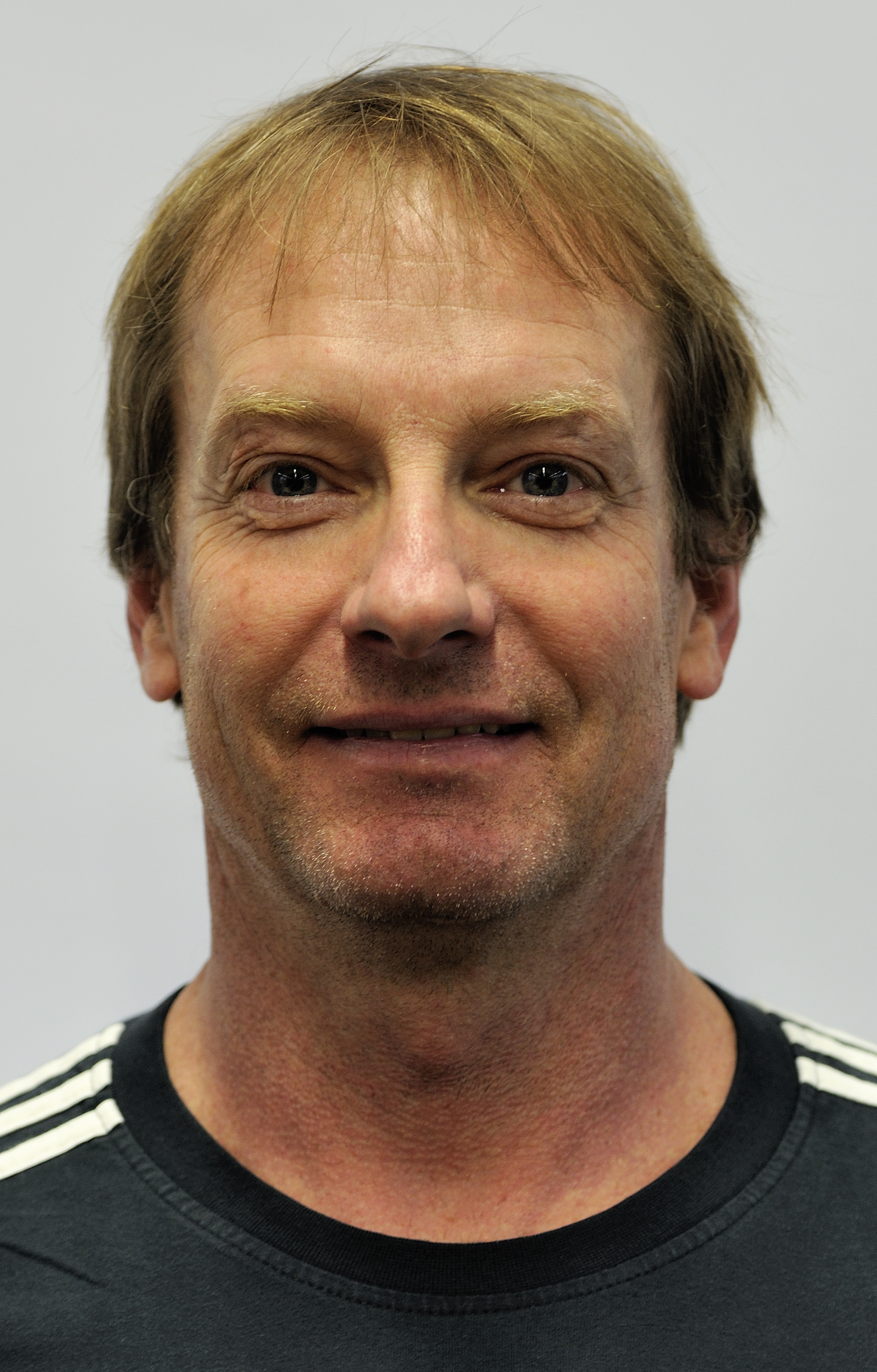
Christoph Langen, bronze medalist in the two-man race

Event	Gold	Silver	Bronze
Two-man	Switzerland (SUI-1); Gustav Weder; Donat Acklin	Germany (GER-1); Rudi Lochner; Markus Zimmermann	Germany (GER-2); Christoph Langen; Günther Eger
Four-man	Austria (AUT-1); Ingo Appelt; Harald Winkler; Gerhard Haidacher; Thomas Schroll	Germany (GER-1); Wolfgang Hoppe; Bogdan Musioł; Axel Kühn; René Hannemann	Switzerland (SUI-1); Gustav Weder; Donat Acklin; Lorenz Schindelholz; Curdin Morell

== Cross-country skiing ==
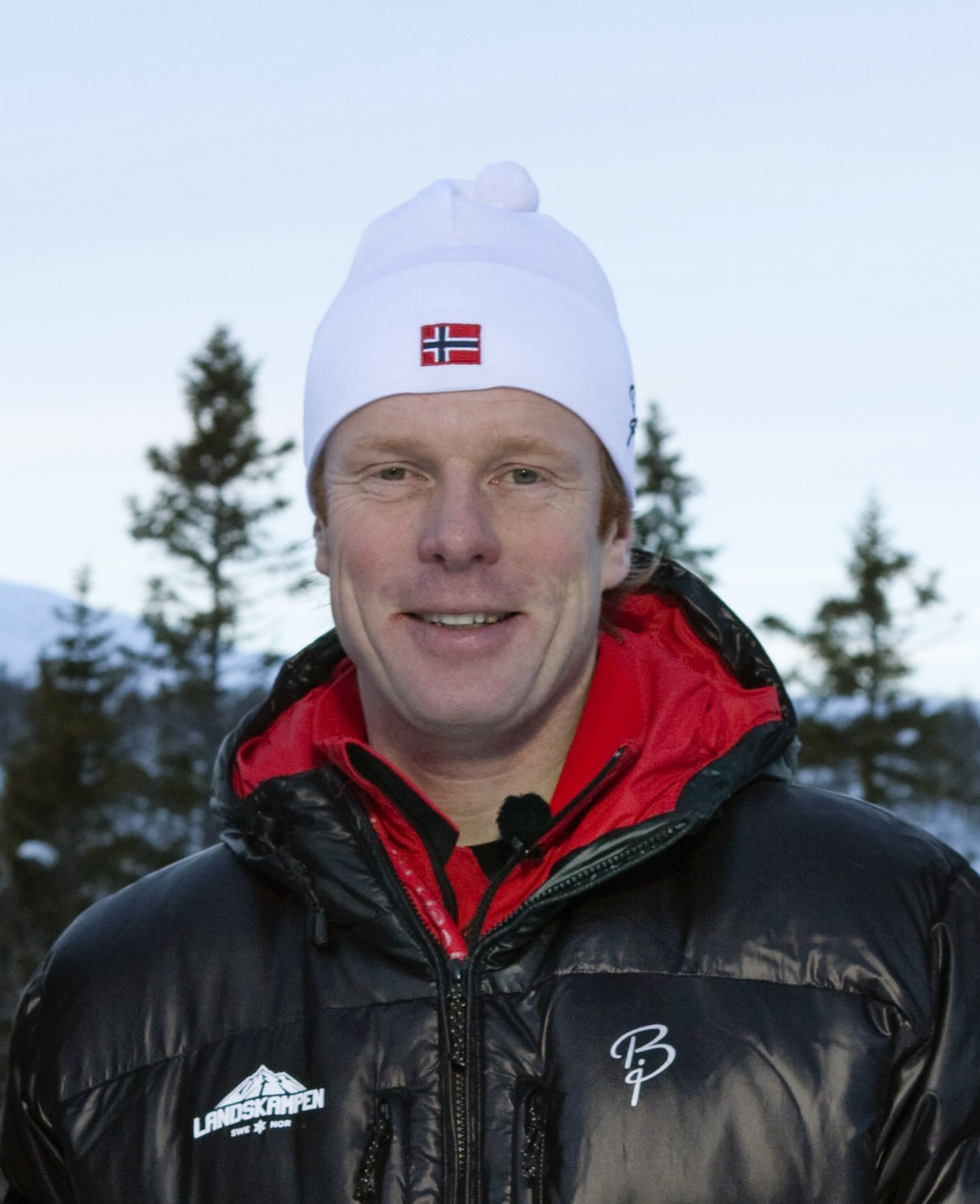
Bjørn Dæhlie won three gold and a silver medal in Albertville.

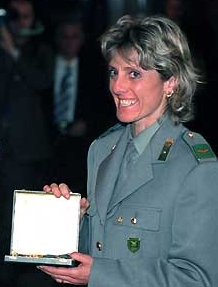
Stefania Belmondo won one medal of each color in Albertville.

Event	Gold	Silver	Bronze
Men's 10 kilometre classical	Vegard Ulvang; Norway	Marco Albarello; Italy	Christer Majbäck; Sweden
Men's 15 kilometre freestyle pursuit	Bjørn Dæhlie; Norway	Vegard Ulvang; Norway	Giorgio Vanzetta; Italy
Men's 30 kilometre classical	Vegard Ulvang; Norway	Bjørn Dæhlie; Norway	Terje Langli; Norway
Men's 50 kilometre freestyle	Bjørn Dæhlie; Norway	Maurilio De Zolt; Italy	Giorgio Vanzetta; Italy
Men's 4 × 10 km relay	Norway; Terje Langli; Vegard Ulvang; Kristen Skjeldal; Bjørn Dæhlie	Italy; Giuseppe Pulie; Marco Albarello; Giorgio Vanzetta; Silvio Fauner	Finland; Mika Kuusisto; Harri Kirvesniemi; Jari Räsänen; Jari Isometsä
Women's 5 kilometre classical	Marjut Lukkarinen; Finland	Lyubov Yegorova; Unified Team	Yelena Välbe; Unified Team
Women's 10 kilometre freestyle pursuit	Lyubov Yegorova; Unified Team	Stefania Belmondo; Italy	Yelena Välbe; Unified Team
Women's 15 kilometre classical	Lyubov Yegorova; Unified Team	Marjut Lukkarinen; Finland	Yelena Välbe; Unified Team
Women's 30 kilometre freestyle	Stefania Belmondo; Italy	Lyubov Yegorova; Unified Team	Yelena Välbe; Unified Team
Women's 4 × 5 km relay	Unified Team; Yelena Välbe; Raisa Smetanina; Larisa Lazutina; Lyubov Yegorova	Norway; Solveig Pedersen; Inger Helene Nybråten; Trude Dybendahl; Elin Nilsen	Italy; Bice Vanzetta; Manuela Di Centa; Gabriella Paruzzi; Stefania Belmondo

== Figure skating ==
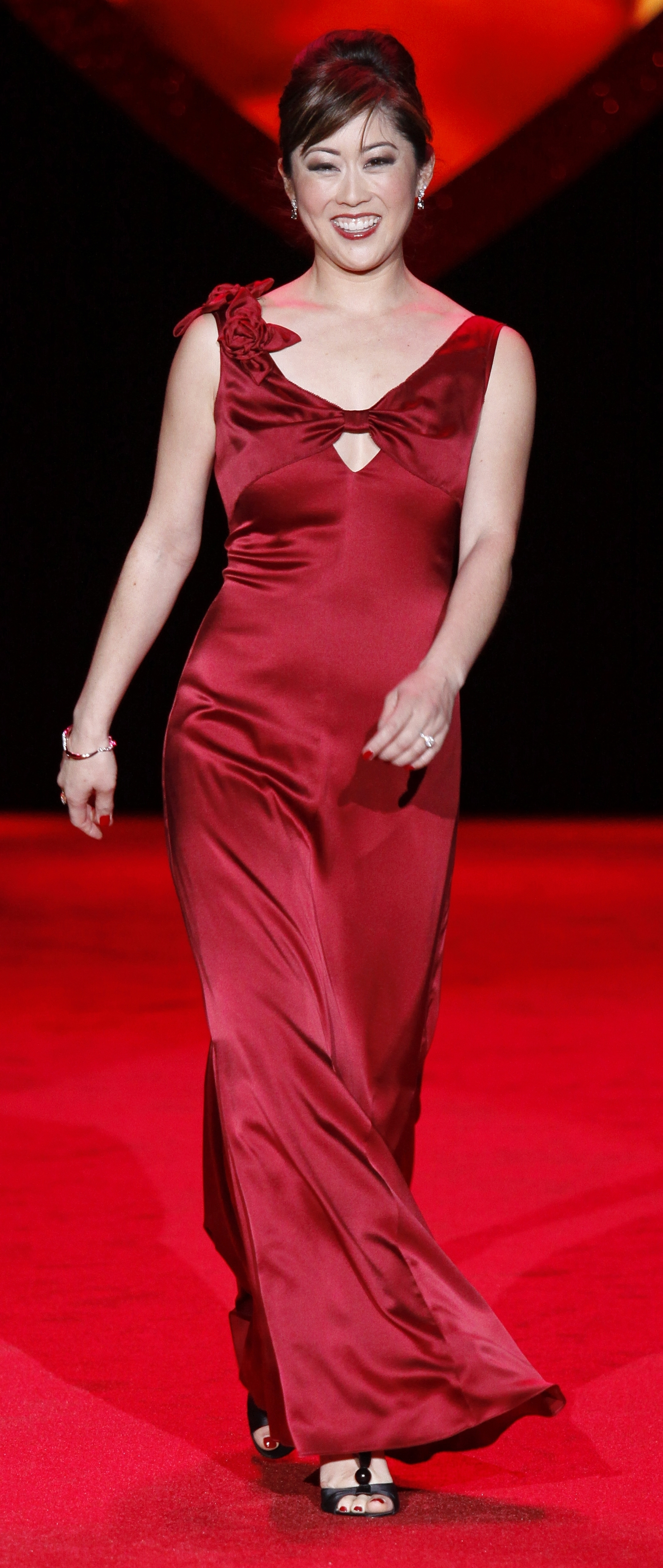
Kristi Yamaguchi won gold in ladies' singles in Albertville.

Event	Gold	Silver	Bronze
Ladies' singles	Kristi Yamaguchi; United States	Midori Ito; Japan	Nancy Kerrigan; United States
Men's singles	Viktor Petrenko; Unified Team	Paul Wylie; United States	Petr Barna; Czechoslovakia
Pairs	Unified Team; Natalia Mishkutionok; Artur Dmitriev	Unified Team; Elena Bechke; Denis Petrov	Canada; Isabelle Brasseur; Lloyd Eisler
Ice dance	Unified Team; Marina Klimova; Sergei Ponomarenko	France; Isabelle Duchesnay; Paul Duchesnay	Unified Team; Maya Usova; Alexander Zhulin

== Freestyle skiing ==
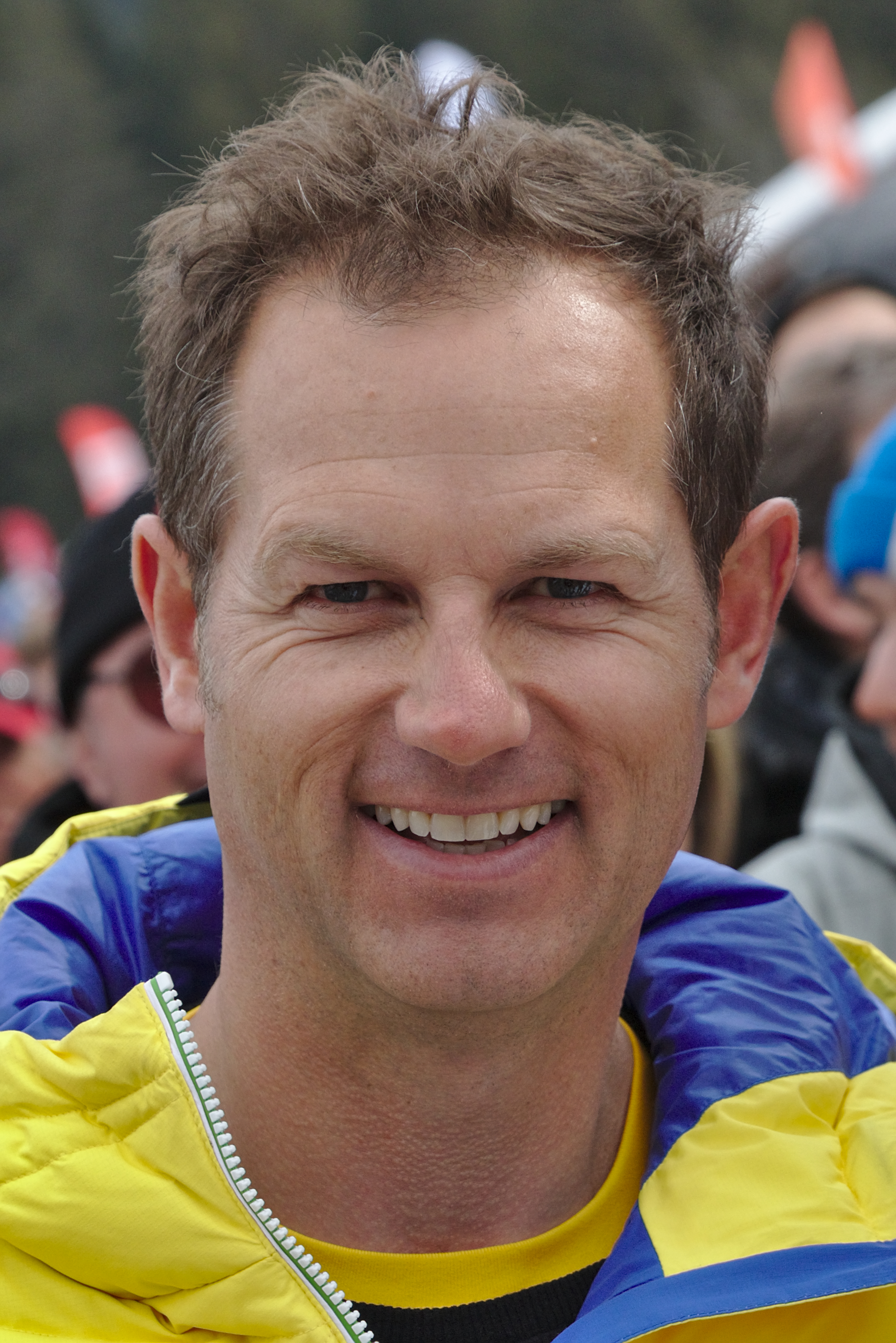
Edgar Grospiron of France won the men's gold medal

Event	Gold	Silver	Bronze
Men's moguls	Edgar Grospiron; France	Olivier Allamand; France	Nelson Carmichael; United States
Women's moguls	Donna Weinbrecht; United States	Yelizaveta Kozhevnikova; Unified Team	Stine Lise Hattestad; Norway

== Ice hockey ==
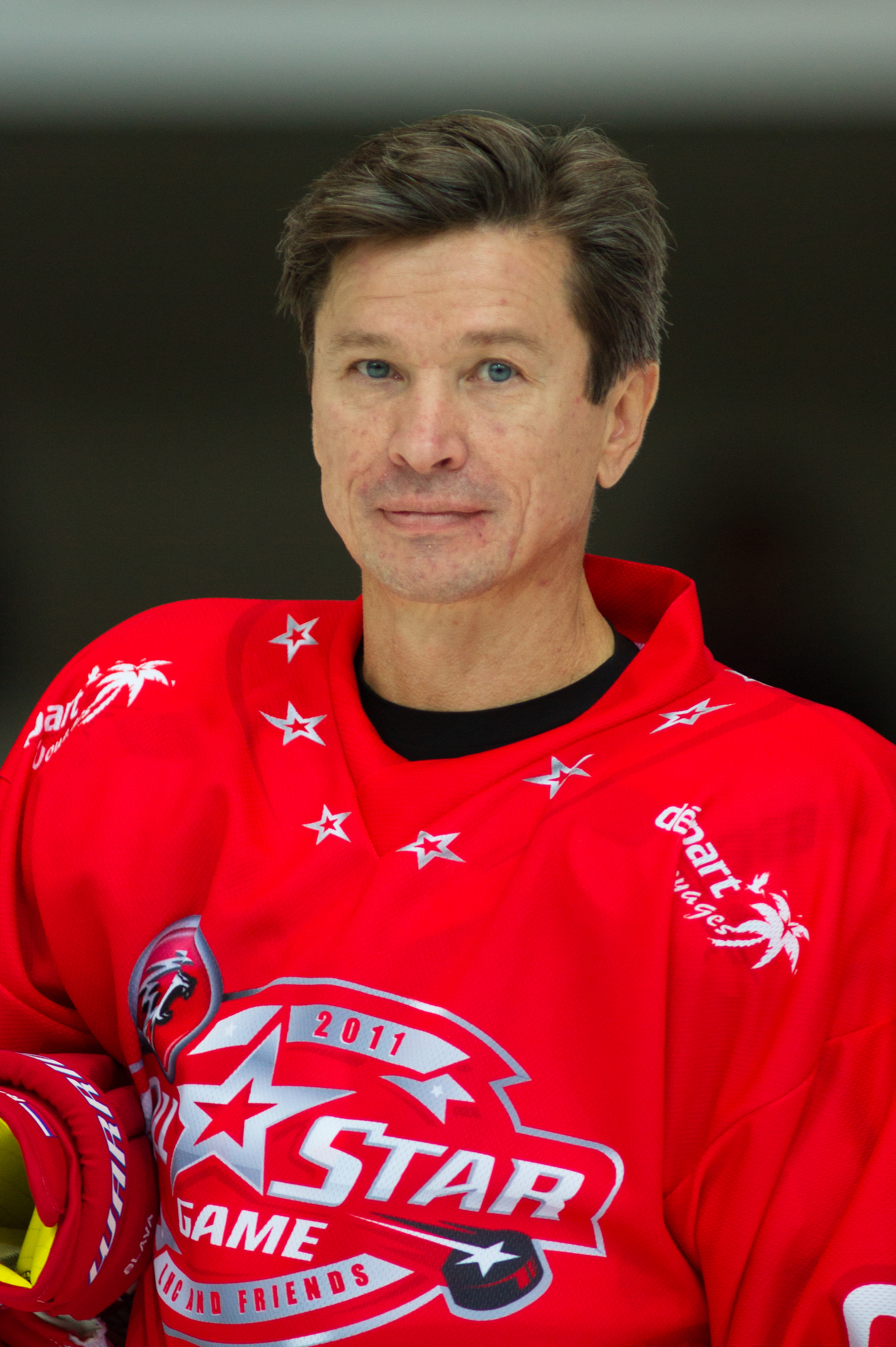
Vyacheslav Bykov was part of the Unified Team's gold medal-winning ice hockey squad.

Event	Gold	Silver	Bronze
Men's team	Unified Team; Sergei Bautin; Igor Boldin; Nikolai Borschevsky; Vyacheslav Butsayev; Vyacheslav Bykov; Evgeni Davydov; Darius Kasparaitis; Nikolai Khabibulin; Yuri Khmylev; Andrei Khomutov; Andrei Kovalenko; Alexei Kovalev; Igor Kravchuk; Vladimir Malakhov; Dmitri Mironov; Sergei Petrenko; Vitali Prokhorov; Mikhail Shtalenkov; Andrei Trefilov; Dmitri Yushkevich; Alexei Zhamnov; Alexei Zhitnik; Sergei Zubov	Canada; Dave Archibald; Todd Brost; Sean Burke; Kevin Dahl; Curt Giles; David Hannan; Gordon Hynes; Fabian Joseph; Joe Juneau; Trevor Kidd; Patrick Lebeau; Chris Lindberg; Eric Lindros; Kent Manderville; Adrien Plavsic; Dan Ratushny; Sam Saint-Laurent; Brad Schlegel; Wallace Schreiber; Randy Smith; David Tippett; Brian Tutt; Jason Woolley	Czechoslovakia; Patrik Augusta; Petr Bříza; Jaromír Dragan; Leo Gudas; Miloslav Hořava; Petr Hrbek; Otakar Janecký; Tomáš Jelínek; Drahomír Kadlec; Kamil Kašťák; Robert Lang; Igor Liba; Ladislav Lubina; František Procházka; Petr Rosol; Bedřich Ščerban; Jiří Šlégr; Richard Šmehlík; Róbert Švehla; Oldřich Svoboda; Radek Ťoupal; Peter Veselovský; Richard Žemlička

== Luge ==
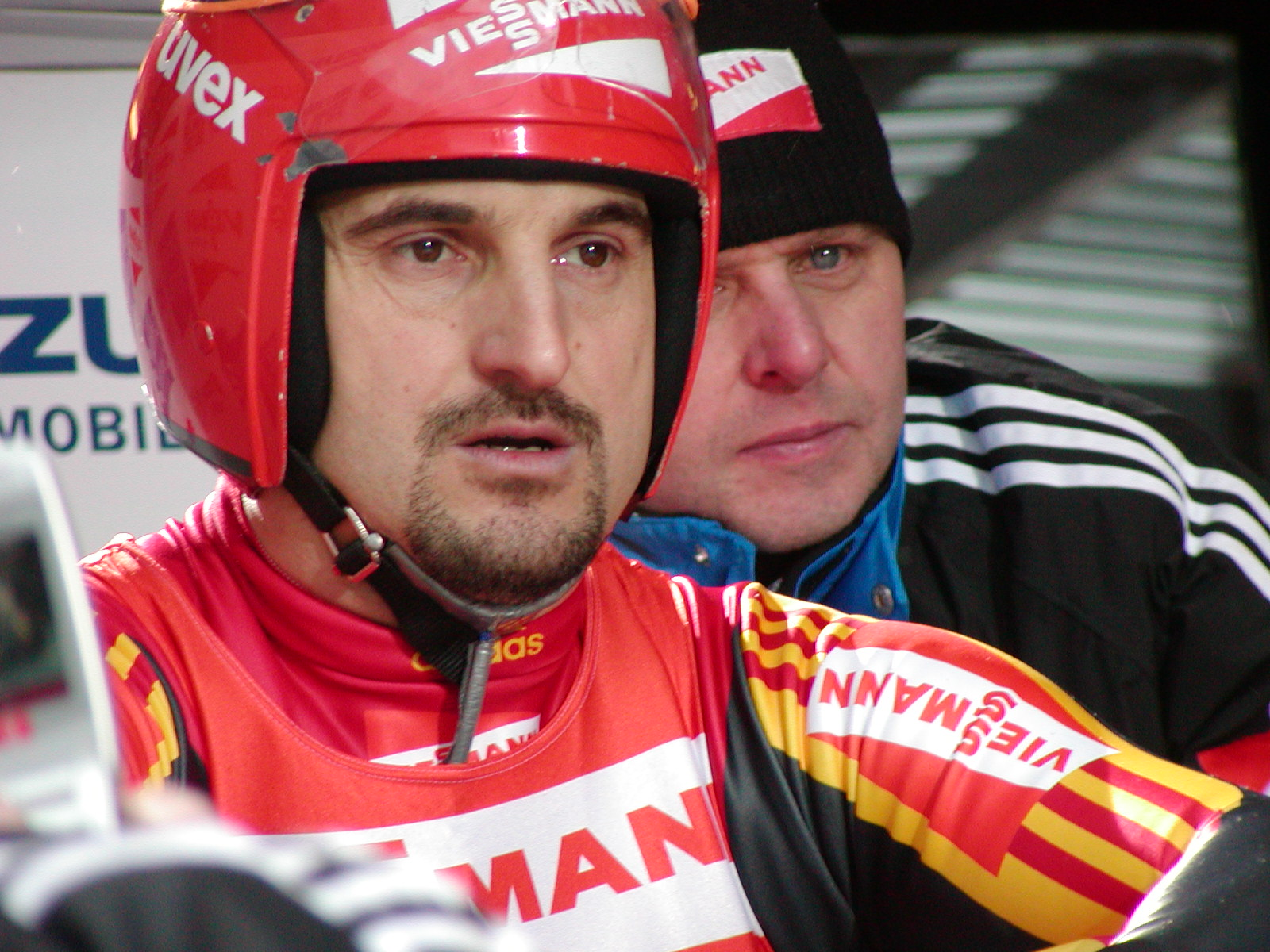
Georg Hackl, gold medalist in men's singles

Event	Gold	Silver	Bronze
Men's singles	Georg Hackl; Germany	Markus Prock; Austria	Markus Schmidt; Austria
Women's singles	Doris Neuner; Austria	Angelika Neuner; Austria	Susi Erdmann; Germany
Doubles	Germany; Stefan Krauße; Jan Behrendt	Germany; Yves Mankel; Thomas Rudolph	Italy; Hansjörg Raffl; Norbert Huber

== Nordic combined ==
Event	Gold	Silver	Bronze
Individual	Fabrice Guy; France	Sylvain Guillaume; France	Klaus Sulzenbacher; Austria
Team	Japan; Reiichi Mikata; Takanori Kono; Kenji Ogiwara	Norway; Knut Tore Apeland; Fred Børre Lundberg; Trond Einar Elden	Austria; Klaus Ofner; Stefan Kreiner; Klaus Sulzenbacher

== Short track speed skating ==
Event	Gold	Silver	Bronze
Men's 1000 metres	Kim Ki-hoon; South Korea	Frédéric Blackburn; Canada	Lee Joon-ho; South Korea
Men's 5000 metre relay	South Korea; Song Jae-kun; Kim Ki-hoon; Lee Joon-ho; Mo Ji-soo	Canada; Mark Lackie; Frédéric Blackburn; Michel Daignault; Laurent Daignault; Sylvain Gagnon	Japan; Yuichi Akasaka; Tatsuyoshi Ishihara; Toshinobu Kawai; Tsutomu Kawasaki
Women's 500 metres	Cathy Turner; United States	Li Yan; China	Hwang Ok-sil; North Korea
Women's 3000 metre relay	Canada; Angela Cutrone; Sylvie Daigle; Nathalie Lambert; Annie Perreault	United States; Darcie Dohnal; Amy Peterson; Cathy Turner; Nikki Ziegelmeyer	Unified Team; Yuliya Allagulova; Natalya Isakova; Viktoriya Troitskaya-Taranina; Yuliya Vlasova

== Ski jumping ==
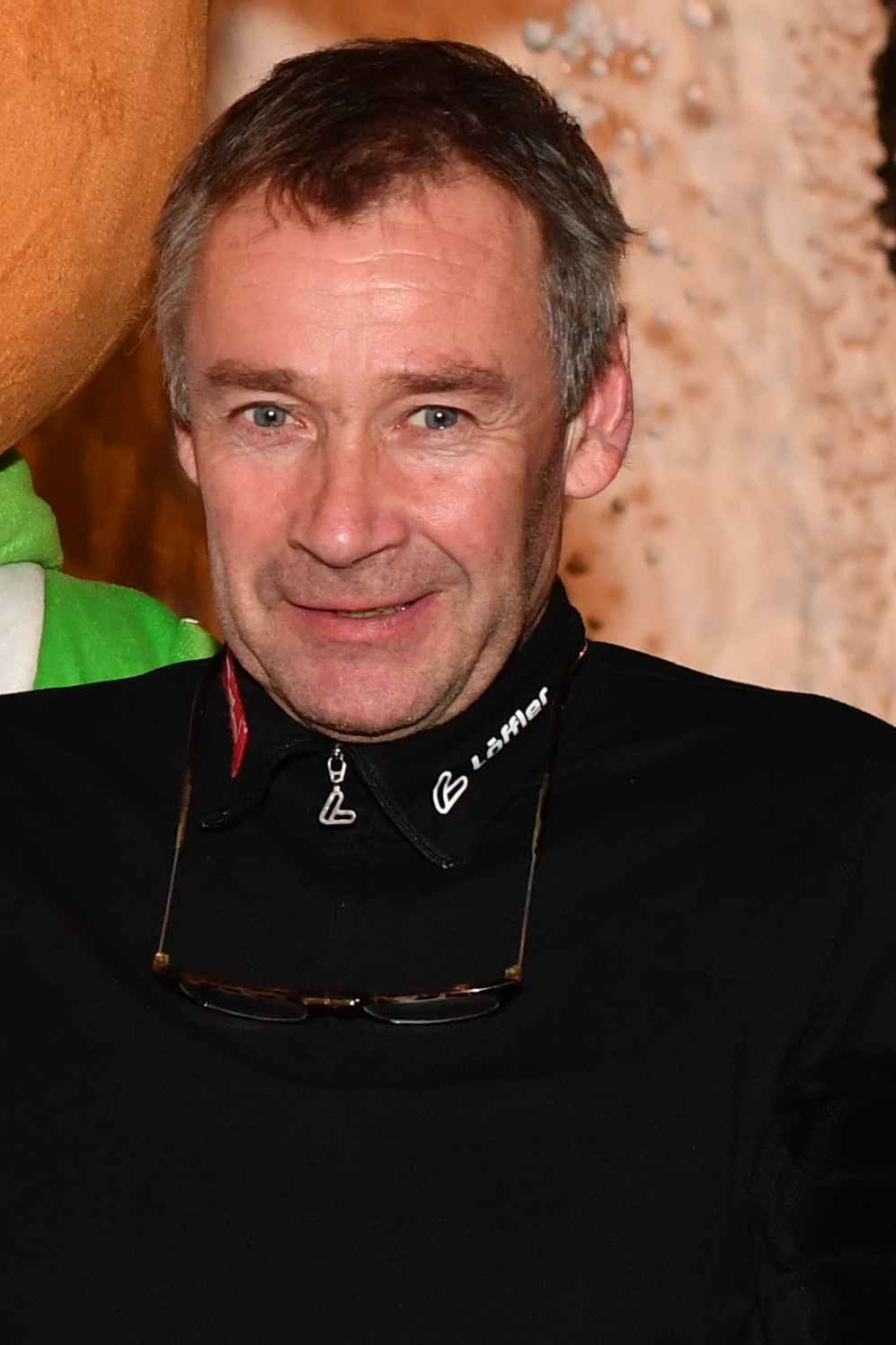
Ernst Vettori won two medals in Albertville.

Event	Gold	Silver	Bronze
Normal hill individual	Ernst Vettori; Austria	Martin Höllwarth; Austria	Toni Nieminen; Finland
Large hill individual	Toni Nieminen; Finland	Martin Höllwarth; Austria	Heinz Kuttin; Austria
Large hill team	Finland; Ari-Pekka Nikkola; Mika Laitinen; Risto Laakkonen; Toni Nieminen	Austria; Heinz Kuttin; Ernst Vettori; Martin Höllwarth; Andreas Felder	Czechoslovakia; Tomáš Goder; František Jež; Jaroslav Sakala; Jiří Parma

== Speed skating ==
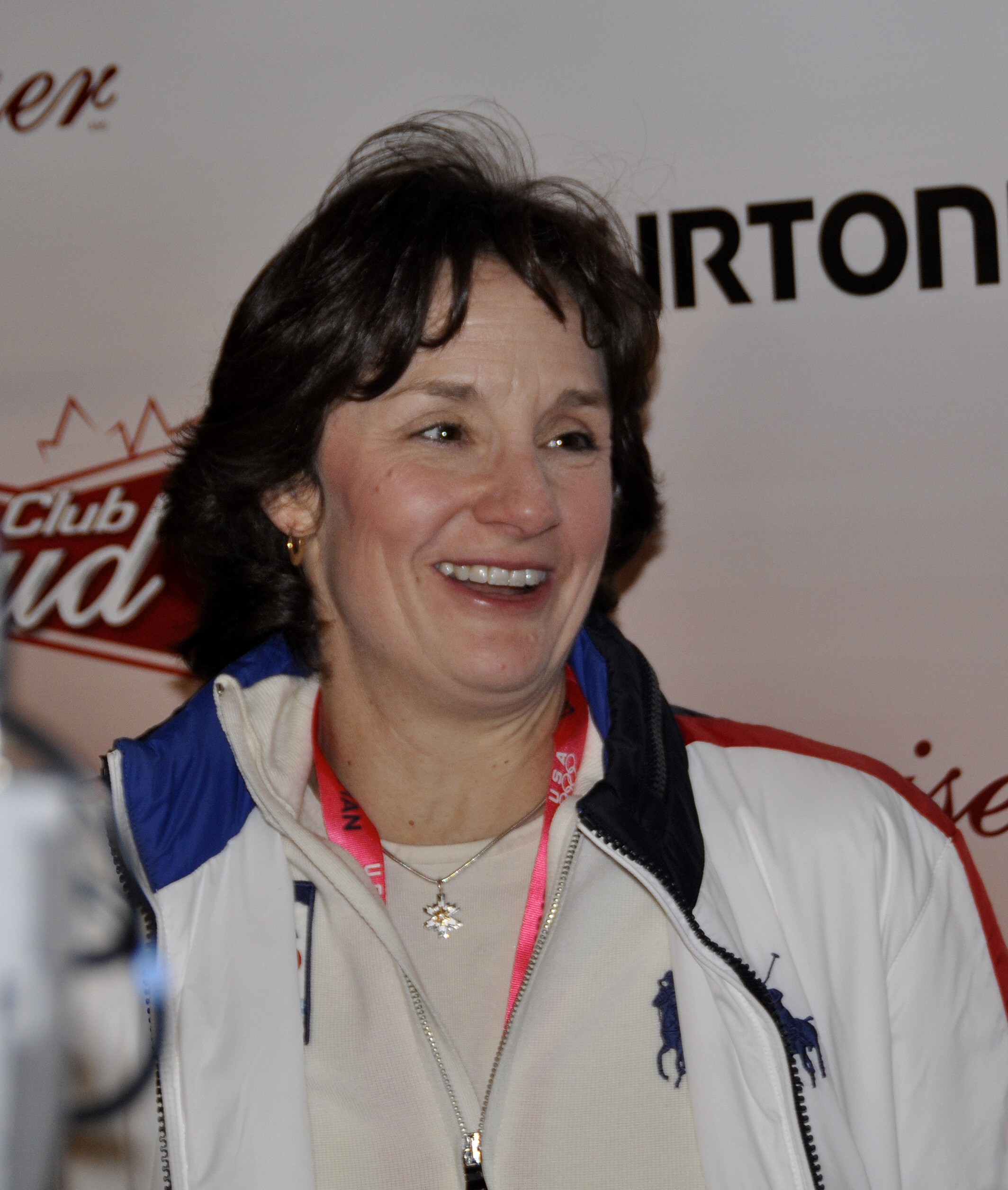
Bonnie Blair was a double gold medalist in Albertville.

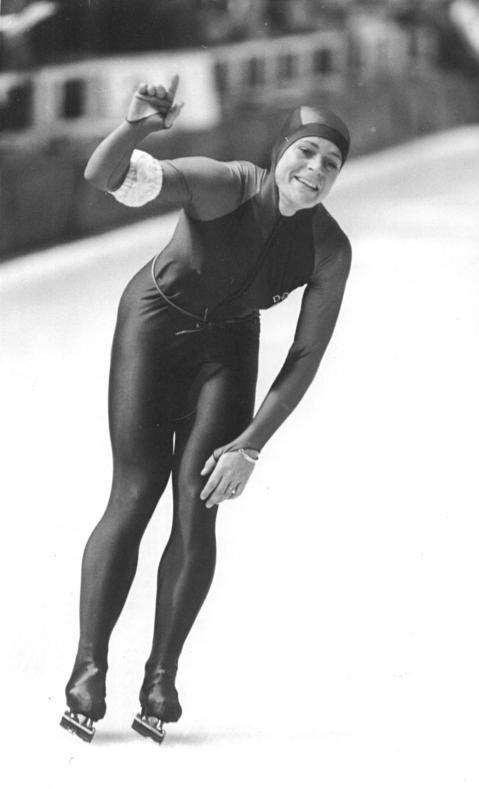
Gunda Niemann-Stirnemann won three medals, including two golds.

Event	Gold	Silver	Bronze
Men's 500 metres	Uwe-Jens Mey; Germany	Toshiyuki Kuroiwa; Japan	Junichi Inoue; Japan
Men's 1000 metres	Olaf Zinke; Germany	Kim Yoon-man; South Korea	Yukinori Miyabe; Japan
Men's 1500 metres	Johann Olav Koss; Norway	Ådne Søndrål; Norway	Leo Visser; Netherlands
Men's 5000 metres	Geir Karlstad; Norway	Falko Zandstra; Netherlands	Leo Visser; Netherlands
Men's 10000 metres	Bart Veldkamp; Netherlands	Johann Olav Koss; Norway	Geir Karlstad; Norway
Women's 500 metres	Bonnie Blair; United States	Ye Qiaobo; China	Christa Luding-Rothenburger; Germany
Women's 1000 metres	Bonnie Blair; United States	Ye Qiaobo; China	Monique Garbrecht; Germany
Women's 1500 metres	Jacqueline Börner; Germany	Gunda Niemann-Stirnemann; Germany	Seiko Hashimoto; Japan
Women's 3000 metres	Gunda Niemann-Stirnemann; Germany	Heike Warnicke; Germany	Emese Hunyady; Austria
Women's 5000 metres	Gunda Niemann-Stirnemann; Germany	Heike Warnicke; Germany	Claudia Pechstein; Germany

== Multiple medalists ==
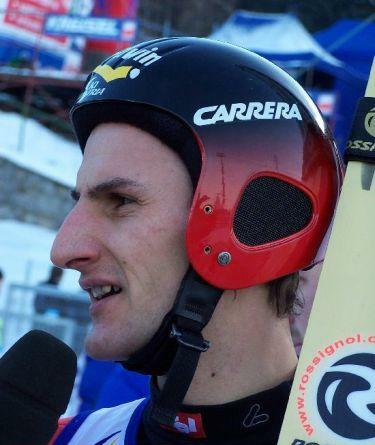
Martin Höllwarth won three silver medals in 1992.

Athletes who won three or more medals during the 1992 Winter Olympics are listed below.

Athlete	Nation	Sport	Gold	Silver	Bronze	Total
Lyubov Yegorova	Unified Team	Cross-country skiing	3	2	0	5
Yelena Välbe	Unified Team	Cross-country skiing	1	0	4	5
Bjørn Dæhlie	Norway	Cross-country skiing	3	1	0	4
Vegard Ulvang	Norway	Cross-country skiing	3	1	0	4
Gunda Niemann-Stirnemann	Germany	Speed skating	2	1	0	3
Mark Kirchner	Germany	Biathlon	2	1	0	3
Toni Nieminen	Finland	Ski jumping	2	0	1	3
Antje Misersky-Harvey	Germany	Biathlon	1	2	0	3
Stefania Belmondo	Italy	Cross-country skiing	1	1	1	3
Martin Höllwarth	Austria	Ski jumping	0	3	0	3
Giorgio Vanzetta	Italy	Cross-country skiing	0	1	2	3

== Notes ==
- ^{a} No bronze medal was awarded in this event because two competitors tied for the silver medal with a time of 2 minutes and 13.71 seconds.

== See also ==
- 1992 Winter Olympics medal table
