= Short-track speed skating at the 1992 Winter Olympics – Women's 3000 metre relay =

Women's 3000 metre relay at the XVI Olympic Winter Games
- Pictogram for short track
- Venue: La halle de glace Olympique
- Dates: 20 February 1992
- Competitors: 32 from 8 nations
- Winning time: 4:36.62

Medalists
| 1st place, gold medalist(s) | | Canada; Angela Cutrone; Sylvie Daigle; Nathalie Lambert; Annie Perreault |
| 2nd place, silver medalist(s) | | United States; Darcie Dohnal; Amy Peterson; Cathy Turner; Nikki Ziegelmeyer |
| 3rd place, bronze medalist(s) | | Unified Team; Yuliya Allagulova; Nataliya Isakova; Viktoriya Troitskaya-Taranina; Yuliya Vlasova |

The Women's 3000 metre relay in short track speed skating at the 1992 Winter Olympics took place on 20 February at La halle de glace Olympique.

== Results ==
=== Semifinals ===
The semifinals were held on 20 February. The top two teams in each semifinal qualified for the A final.

Semifinal 1

| Rank | Country | Athlete | Result | Notes |
|---|---|---|---|---|
| 1 | Canada | Angela Cutrone; Sylvie Daigle; Nathalie Lambert; Annie Perreault | 4:42.10 | QA |
| 2 | United States | Darcie Dohnal; Amy Peterson; Cathy Turner; Nikki Ziegelmeyer | 4:42.56 | QA |
| 3 | Netherlands | Priscilla Ernst; Joëlle van Koetsveld van Ankeren; Monique Velzeboer; Simone Velzeboer | 4:47.21 | QB |
| 4 | Italy | Marinella Canclini; Maria Rosa Candido; Ketty La Torre; Cristina Sciolla | 4:47.31 | QB |

Semifinal 2

| Rank | Country | Athlete | Result | Notes |
|---|---|---|---|---|
| 1 | Japan | Mie Naito; Rie Sato; Hiromi Takeuchi; Nobuko Yamada | 4:37.08 | QA OR |
| 2 | Unified Team | Yuliya Allagulova; Nataliya Isakova; Viktoriya Troitskaya-Taranina; Yuliya Vlasova | 4:38.37 | QA |
| 3 | France | Valérie Barizza; Sandrine Daudet; Murielle Leyssieux; Karine Rubini | 4:43.32 | QB |
| – | China | Li Yan; Wang Xiulan; Zhang Yanmei; Li Changxiang | DQ | |

=== Finals ===
The four qualifying teams competed in Final A.

Final A

| Rank | Country | Athlete | Result | Notes |
|---|---|---|---|---|
| 1st place, gold medalist(s) | Canada | Angela Cutrone; Sylvie Daigle; Nathalie Lambert; Annie Perreault | 4:36.62 | |
| 2nd place, silver medalist(s) | United States | Darcie Dohnal; Amy Peterson; Cathy Turner; Nikki Ziegelmeyer | 4:37.85 | |
| 3rd place, bronze medalist(s) | Unified Team | Yuliya Allagulova; Nataliya Isakova; Viktoriya Troitskaya-Taranina; Yuliya Vlasova | 4:42.69 | |
| 4 | Japan | Mie Naito; Rie Sato; Hiromi Takeuchi; Nobuko Yamada | 4:44.50 | |
