= Short-track speed skating at the 1992 Winter Olympics – Women's 500 metres =

Women's 500 metres at the XVI Olympic Winter Games
- Pictogram for short track
- Venue: La halle de glace Olympique
- Dates: 18–22 February 1992
- Competitors: 27 from 14 nations
- Winning time: 47.04

Medalists
1st place, gold medalist(s)		Cathy Turner	United States
2nd place, silver medalist(s)		Li Yan	China
3rd place, bronze medalist(s)		Hwang Ok-sil	North Korea

The women's 500 metres in short track speed skating at the 1992 Winter Olympics took place on 18 and 20 February at La halle de glace Olympique.

== Results ==
=== Heats ===
The first round was held on 18 February. There were eight heats, with the top two finishers moving on to the quarterfinals.

Heat 1

Rank	Athlete	Country	Time	Notes
1	Kim So-hui	South Korea	50.99	Q
2	Joëlle van Koetsveld van Ankeren	Netherlands	60.29	Q
–	Zhang Yanmei	China	DQ	

Heat 2

Rank	Athlete	Country	Time	Notes
1	Cathy Turner	United States	47.69	Q
2	Chun Lee-kyung	South Korea	48.18	Q
3	Sylvie Daigle	Canada	48.50	

Heat 3

Rank	Athlete	Country	Time	Notes
1	Wang Xiulan	China	47.49	Q
2	Annie Perreault	Canada	48.41	Q
3	Felicity Campbell	Australia	50.11	
4	Debbie Palmer	Great Britain	52.24	

Heat 4

Rank	Athlete	Country	Time	Notes
1	Li Yan	China	48.33	Q
2	Nathalie Lambert	Canada	48.41	Q
3	Nataliya Isakova	Unified Team	48.49	
4	Tamara Kaszala	Hungary	52.38	

Heat 5

Rank	Athlete	Country	Time	Notes
1	Nobuko Yamada	Japan	48.79	Q
2	Bea Pintens	Belgium	48.98	Q
3	Cristina Sciolla	Italy	52.53	

Heat 6

Rank	Athlete	Country	Time	Notes
1	Hwang Ok-sil	North Korea	48.70	Q
2	Karine Rubini	France	49.25	Q
3	Amy Peterson	United States	51.05	
4	Simone Velzeboer	Netherlands	55.43	

Heat 7

Rank	Athlete	Country	Time	Notes
1	Marinella Canclini	Italy	47.00	Q OR
2	Marina Pylayeva	Unified Team	47.48	Q
–	Karen Gardiner-Kah	Australia	DQ	

Heat 8

Rank	Athlete	Country	Time	Notes
1	Monique Velzeboer	Netherlands	48.09	Q
2	Yuliya Vlasova	Unified Team	48.29	Q
3	Kim Chun-hwa	North Korea	49.10	

=== Quarterfinals ===
The top two finishers in each of the four quarterfinals advanced to the semifinals.

Quarterfinal 1

Rank	Athlete	Country	Time	Notes
1	Cathy Turner	United States	48.51	Q
2	Nathalie Lambert	Canada	51.04	Q
3	Nobuko Yamada	Japan	57.69	
4	Karine Rubini	France	68.41	

Quarterfinal 2

Rank	Athlete	Country	Time	Notes
1	Li Yan	China	48.33	Q
2	Yuliya Vlasova	Unified Team	48.63	Q
3	Joëlle van Koetsveld van Ankeren	Netherlands	67.23	
4	Marinella Canclini	Italy	87.18	

Quarterfinal 3

Rank	Athlete	Country	Time	Notes
1	Wang Xiulan	China	47.56	Q
2	Hwang Ok-sil	North Korea	47.95	Q
3	Chun Lee-kyung	South Korea	48.25	
4	Bea Pintens	Belgium	48.49	

Quarterfinal 4

Rank	Athlete	Country	Time	Notes
1	Marina Pylayeva	Unified Team	47.95	Q
2	Monique Velzeboer	Netherlands	53.46	Q
3	Kim So-hui	South Korea	54.90	
–	Annie Perreault	Canada	DQ	

=== Semifinals ===
The top two finishers in each of the two semifinals qualified for the A final, while the third and fourth place skaters advanced to the B Final.

Semifinal 1

Rank	Athlete	Country	Time	Notes
1	Hwang Ok-sil	North Korea	47.74	QA
2	Li Yan	China	48.33	QA
3	Nathalie Lambert	Canada	61.90	QB
4	Marina Pylayeva	Unified Team	67.56	QB

Semifinal 2

Rank	Athlete	Country	Time	Notes
1	Cathy Turner	United States	47.41	QA
2	Monique Velzeboer	Netherlands	47.52	QA
3	Wang Xiulan	China	48.04	QB
4	Yuliya Vlasova	Unified Team	68.90	QB

=== Finals ===
The four qualifying skaters competed in Final A, while four others raced for 5th place in Final B.

Final A

Rank	Athlete	Country	Time	Notes
1st place, gold medalist(s)	Cathy Turner	United States	47.04	
2nd place, silver medalist(s)	Li Yan	China	47.08	
3rd place, bronze medalist(s)	Hwang Ok-sil	North Korea	47.23	
4	Monique Velzeboer	Netherlands	47.28	

Final B

Rank	Athlete	Country	Time	Notes
5	Marina Pylayeva	Unified Team	48.42	
6	Nathalie Lambert	Canada	48.50	
7	Yuliya Vlasova	Unified Team	48.70	
8	Wang Xiulan	China	94.12	
