= 1992 World Short Track Speed Skating Team Championships =

Short track team championship

- Location: Minamimaki, Japan
- Start date: 14-15 March 1992

The 1992 World Short Track Speed Skating Team Championships was the 2nd edition of the World Short Track Speed Skating Team Championships which took place on 14-15 March 1992 in Minamimaki, Japan.

== Medal winners ==
Event	Gold	Silver	Bronze
Men	South Korea; Mo Ji-soo; Song Jae-kun; Lee Song-uk; Kim Ki-hoon; Kwon Young-chui	Italy; Mirko Vuillermin; Orazio Fagone; Hugo Herrnhof; Diego Cattani	Japan; Toshinobu Kawai; Tatsuyoshi Ishihara; Tsutomu Kawasaki; Yuichi Akasaka; Jun Uematsu
Women	South Korea; Lee Yoon-sook; Kim Soo-hee; Shin So-ja; Chun Lee-kyung; Kim Ryang-hee	Japan; Hiromi Takeuchi; Tsugumi Watanabe; Nobuko Yamada; Mie Naito; Rie Sato	China; Li Yan; Zheng Chunyang; Wang Xiulan; Li Changxiang

== Results ==
=== Men ===
Rank	Nation	Total
1st place, gold medalist(s)	South Korea	79
2nd place, silver medalist(s)	Italy	66
3rd place, bronze medalist(s)	Japan	61
4	United States	44
5	France	40
6	North Korea	40
7	Netherlands	23

=== Women ===
Rank	Nation	Total
1st place, gold medalist(s)	South Korea	79
2nd place, silver medalist(s)	Japan	63
3rd place, bronze medalist(s)	China	58
4	North Korea	47
5	Italy	42
6	CIS	41
7	France	24
