= Velzeboer =

Velzeboer is a Dutch surname. Notable people with the surname include:

- Mark Velzeboer (born 1968), Dutch short track speed skater
- Michelle Velzeboer (born 2003), Dutch short track speed skater
- Monique Velzeboer (born 1969), Dutch short track speed skater
- Simone Velzeboer (born 1967), Dutch short track speed skater
- Xandra Velzeboer (born 2001), Dutch short track speed skater
