= Short-track speed skating at the 1994 Winter Olympics – Women's 500 metres =

Women's 500 metres at the XVII Olympic Winter Games
- Pictogram for short track
- Venue: Hamar Olympic Amphitheatre
- Dates: 24 February 1994
- Competitors: 30 from 13 nations
- Winning time: 45.98

Medalists
1st place, gold medalist(s)		Cathy Turner	United States
2nd place, silver medalist(s)		Zhang Yanmei	China
3rd place, bronze medalist(s)		Amy Peterson	United States

The women's 500 metres in short track speed skating at the 1994 Winter Olympics took place on 24 February at the Hamar Olympic Amphitheatre.

== Results ==
=== Heats ===
The first round was held on 24 February. There were eight heats, with the top two finishers moving on to the quarterfinals.

Heat 1

Rank	Athlete	Country	Time	Notes
1	Wang Xiulan	China	47.32	Q
2	Nathalie Lambert	Canada	47.38	Q
3	Evgeniya Radanova	Bulgaria	50.67	

Heat 2

Rank	Athlete	Country	Time	Notes
1	Cathy Turner	United States	46.22	Q
2	Won Hye-kyung	South Korea	48.08	Q
3	Anke Jannie Landman	Netherlands	48.36	
4	Bea Pintens	Belgium	49.59	

Heat 3

Rank	Athlete	Country	Time	Notes
1	Sylvie Daigle	Canada	46.98	Q
2	Chun Lee-kyung	South Korea	47.14	Q
3	Yelena Tikhanina	Russia	47.79	
4	Debbie Palmer	Great Britain	47.93	

Heat 4

Rank	Athlete	Country	Time	Notes
1	Isabelle Charest	Canada	46.92	Q
2	Sandrine Daudet	France	49.06	Q
3	Barbara Baldissera	Italy	79.96	
–	Sofie Pintens	Belgium	DQ	

Heat 5

Rank	Athlete	Country	Time	Notes
1	Ayako Tsubaki	Japan	48.49	Q
2	Karen Gardiner-Kah	Australia	48.56	Q
3	Viktoriya Troitskaya-Taranina	Russia	48.59	
4	Valérie Barizza	France	50.30	

Heat 6

Rank	Athlete	Country	Time	Notes
1	Marinella Canclini	Italy	47.19	Q
2	Kim So-hee	South Korea	47.77	Q
3	Yelena Sinitsina	Kazakhstan	50.36	

Heat 7

Rank	Athlete	Country	Time	Notes
1	Yang Yang (S)	China	47.23	Q
2	Marina Pylayeva	Russia	47.47	Q
3	Katia Mosconi	Italy	47.90	
4	Penèlope di Lella	Netherlands	48.44	

Heat 8

Rank	Athlete	Country	Time	Notes
1	Amy Peterson	United States	47.02	Q
2	Zhang Yanmei	China	47.35	Q
3	Laure Drouet	France	50.47	
4	Cindy Meyer	South Africa	77.18	

=== Quarterfinals ===
The top two finishers in each of the four quarterfinals advanced to the semifinals.

Quarterfinal 1

Rank	Athlete	Country	Time	Notes
1	Isabelle Charest	Canada	47.25	Q
2	Yang Yang (S)	China	47.25	Q
3	Karen Gardiner-Kah	Australia	47.90	
4	Chun Lee-kyung	South Korea	69.56	

Quarterfinal 2

Rank	Athlete	Country	Time	Notes
1	Amy Peterson	United States	46.59	Q OR
2	Zhang Yanmei	China	46.64	Q
3	Sandrine Daudet	France	47.97	
4	Marinella Canclini	Italy	88.77	

Quarterfinal 3

Rank	Athlete	Country	Time	Notes
1	Kim So-hee	South Korea	46.97	Q
2	Cathy Turner	United States	47.24	Q
3	Ayako Tsubaki	Japan	47.51	
4	Nathalie Lambert	Canada	65.45	

Quarterfinal 4

Rank	Athlete	Country	Time	Notes
1	Wang Xiulan	China	48.40	Q
2	Won Hye-kyung	South Korea	48.87	Q
3	Sylvie Daigle	Canada	55.59	
–	Marina Pylayeva	Russia	DQ	

=== Semifinals ===
The top two finishers in each of the two semifinals qualified for the A final, while the third and fourth place skaters advanced to the B Final.

Semifinal 1

Rank	Athlete	Country	Time	Notes
1	Zhang Yanmei	China	46.01	QA OR
2	Amy Peterson	United States	46.28	QA
3	Kim So-hee	South Korea	46.36	QB
–	Yang Yang (S)	China	DQ	

Semifinal 2

Rank	Athlete	Country	Time	Notes
1	Cathy Turner	United States	47.54	QA
2	Won Hye-kyung	South Korea	47.63	QA
3	Wang Xiulan	China	48.00	QB
–	Isabelle Charest	Canada	DQ	

=== Finals ===
The four qualifying skaters competed in Final A, while four others raced for 5th place in Final B.

Final A

Rank	Athlete	Country	Time	Notes
1st place, gold medalist(s)	Cathy Turner	United States	45.98	OR
2nd place, silver medalist(s)	Zhang Yanmei	China	46.44	
3rd place, bronze medalist(s)	Amy Peterson	United States	46.76	
4	Won Hye-kyung	South Korea	47.60	

Final B

Rank	Athlete	Country	Time	Notes
5	Kim So-hee	South Korea	49.01	
6	Wang Xiulan	China	49.03	
