= Cutrone =

Cutrone is a surname. Notable people with the surname include:

- Angela Cutrone (born 1969), Canadian speed skater
- Kelly Cutrone (born 1965), American fashion publicist, television personality and writer
- Ronnie Cutrone (1948–2013), American artist
- Patrick Cutrone (born 1998), Italian footballer who plays for Parma
