= Rie Sato =

Rie Sato may refer to:

- Rie Sato (ice hockey) (佐藤 理絵, born 1972), Japanese ice hockey player
- Rie Sato (softball) (佐藤 理恵, born 1980), Japanese softball player
- Rie Sato (speed skater) (佐藤 利江, born 1972), Japanese speed skater
