= Luobei County =

Luobei County 萝北县
- County
- Mingshan Scenic Area county bus terminal street view Baoquanling Jiangbin Farm

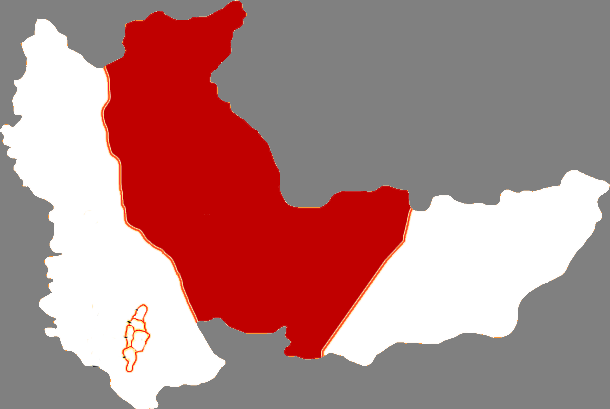

- Location in Heilongjiang
- Coordinates: 47°40′N 130°42′E
- Country: People's Republic of China
- Province: Heilongjiang
- Prefecture-level city: Hegang

Area
  - Land: 6,761 km^{2} (2,610 sq mi)

Population
  - Total: 220,131
  - Density: 32.56/km^{2} (84.33/sq mi)
- Time zone: UTC+8 (China Standard)
- Website: www.luobei.gov.cn

Luobei County (simplified Chinese: 萝北县; traditional Chinese: 蘿北縣; pinyin: Luóběi Xiàn) is a county of eastern Heilongjiang province, People's Republic of China, bordering Russia's Jewish Autonomous Oblast to the north. It is under the jurisdiction of the prefecture-level city of Hegang.

== Administrative divisions ==
Luobei County is divided into 6 towns, 1 township and 1 ethnic township.

6 towns

- Fengxiang (凤翔镇), Hebei (鹤北镇), Mingshan (名山镇), Tuanjie (团结镇), Zhaoxing (肇兴镇), Yunshan (云山镇)

1 township

- Taipinggou (太平沟乡)

1 ethnic township

- Dongming Korean (东明朝鲜族乡)

== Demographics ==
The population of the district was 231,620 in 1999.

== Climate ==
Climate data for Luobei, elevation 83 m (272 ft), (1991–2020 normals, extremes 1981–2010)
Month	Jan	Feb	Mar	Apr	May	Jun	Jul	Aug	Sep	Oct	Nov	Dec	Year
Record high °C (°F)	1.5 (34.7)	8.7 (47.7)	19.2 (66.6)	30.1 (86.2)	33.3 (91.9)	38.0 (100.4)	39.0 (102.2)	36.1 (97.0)	31.5 (88.7)	25.5 (77.9)	15.9 (60.6)	3.2 (37.8)	39.0 (102.2)
Mean daily maximum °C (°F)	−12.8 (9.0)	−7.4 (18.7)	1.3 (34.3)	12.1 (53.8)	20.0 (68.0)	24.6 (76.3)	27.1 (80.8)	25.5 (77.9)	20.4 (68.7)	11.0 (51.8)	−2.1 (28.2)	−12.1 (10.2)	9.0 (48.1)
Daily mean °C (°F)	−18.8 (−1.8)	−14.0 (6.8)	−4.6 (23.7)	5.8 (42.4)	13.7 (56.7)	19.1 (66.4)	22.1 (71.8)	20.3 (68.5)	14.1 (57.4)	5.0 (41.0)	−7.3 (18.9)	−17.3 (0.9)	3.2 (37.7)
Mean daily minimum °C (°F)	−24.4 (−11.9)	−20.7 (−5.3)	−11 (12)	−0.3 (31.5)	7.5 (45.5)	13.9 (57.0)	17.5 (63.5)	15.7 (60.3)	8.3 (46.9)	−0.5 (31.1)	−12.1 (10.2)	−22.3 (−8.1)	−2.4 (27.7)
Record low °C (°F)	−41.4 (−42.5)	−36.6 (−33.9)	−31.1 (−24.0)	−13.5 (7.7)	−4.2 (24.4)	3.7 (38.7)	10.1 (50.2)	5.5 (41.9)	−4.3 (24.3)	−14.5 (5.9)	−31.0 (−23.8)	−38.0 (−36.4)	−41.4 (−42.5)
Average precipitation mm (inches)	4.0 (0.16)	3.9 (0.15)	10.4 (0.41)	26.7 (1.05)	70.3 (2.77)	108.9 (4.29)	140.4 (5.53)	149.8 (5.90)	74.7 (2.94)	27.1 (1.07)	12.3 (0.48)	7.1 (0.28)	635.6 (25.03)
Average precipitation days (≥ 0.1 mm)	4.2	3.1	5.1	7.6	12.1	13.8	13.9	14.5	10.7	7.1	4.8	5.7	102.6
Average snowy days	8.0	6.1	7.9	3.8	0.1	0	0	0	0	2.7	7.9	9.6	46.1
Average relative humidity (%)	68	62	57	55	61	73	81	82	75	63	64	69	68
Mean monthly sunshine hours	187.3	212.5	256.5	237.7	248.2	234.7	234.4	227.8	221.9	197.6	171.0	163.5	2,593.1
Percentage possible sunshine	68	73	69	58	53	49	49	52	60	60	62	62	60
Source: China Meteorological Administration

== Crush video ==
In 2006 an Internet crush video surfaced in which a woman stomps on a kitten with stiletto high-heels. Eventually the woman drives her heel into the kitten's eye and penetrates the eye socket, leading to loss of blood and the death of the kitten. Internet users discovered and revealed the identity of the woman as Wang Jue (simplified Chinese: 王珏; traditional Chinese: 王玨; pinyin: Wáng Jué), a Chinese nurse, and revealed that the cameraman is a provincial television employee. Wang Jue posted an apology on the Luobei county government official website, claiming that she was susceptible to persuasion to crush the kitten, being despondent from her recent divorce. Both Wang Jue and the cameraman lost their jobs as a result of the incident, although their actions were not illegal under Chinese animal cruelty laws.
