= Felicity Campbell (speed skater) =

Australian speed skater

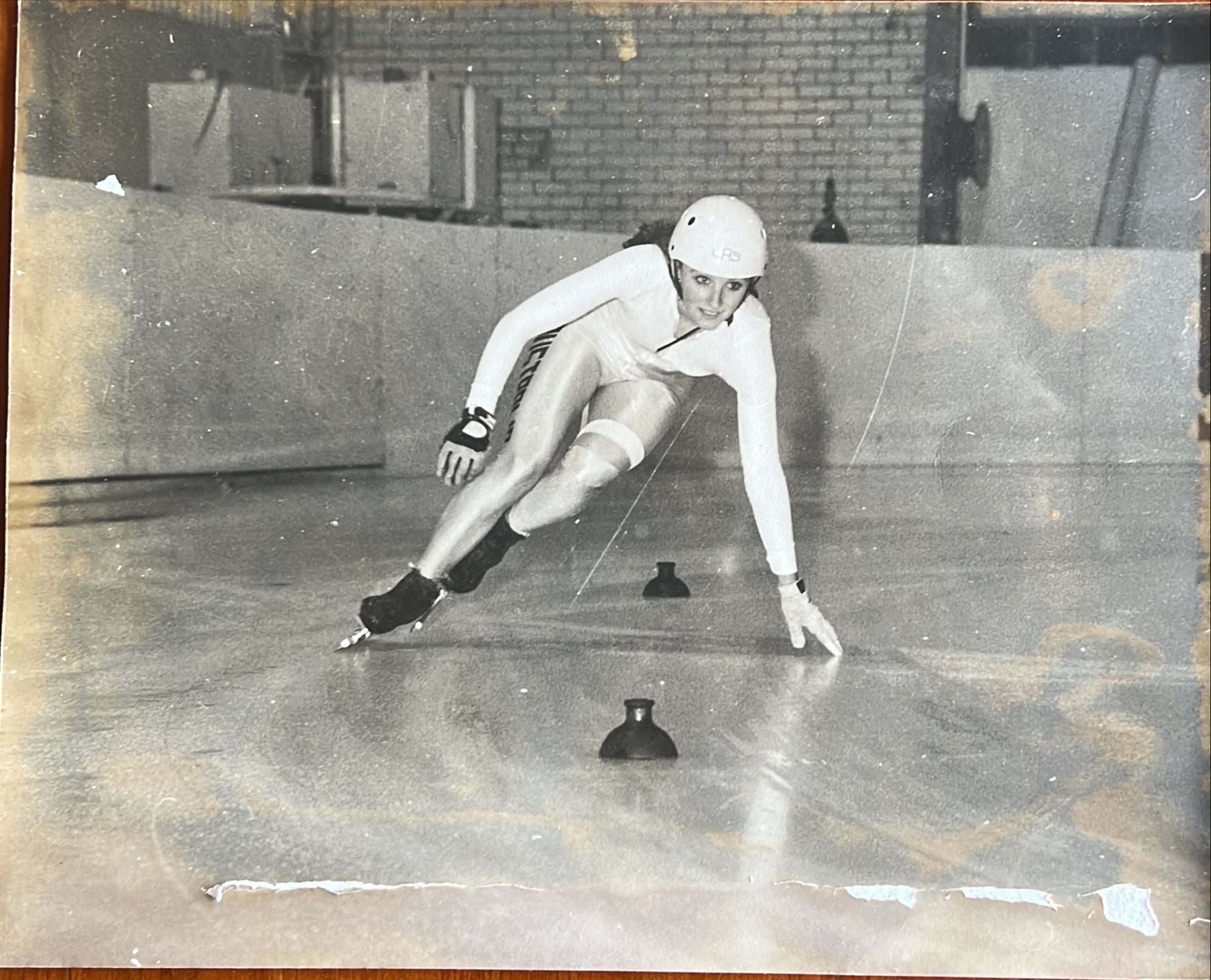

Personal information
- Nationality: Australian
- Born: 23 April 1974 (age 50); Lismore, New South Wales, Australia

Sport
- Sport: Short track speed skating

Felicity Campbell (born 23 April 1974) is an Australian short track speed skater. She competed in the women's 500 metres event at the 1992 Winter Olympics.
