= Ketty La Torre =

Italian speed skater

Personal information
- Nationality: Italian
- Born: 25 December 1972 (age 52); Monza, Italy

Sport
- Sport: Short track speed skating

Ketty La Torre (born 25 December 1972) is an Italian short track speed skater. She competed in the women's 3000 metre relay event at the 1992 Winter Olympics.
