= Michelle Velzeboer =

Dutch speed skater (born 2003)

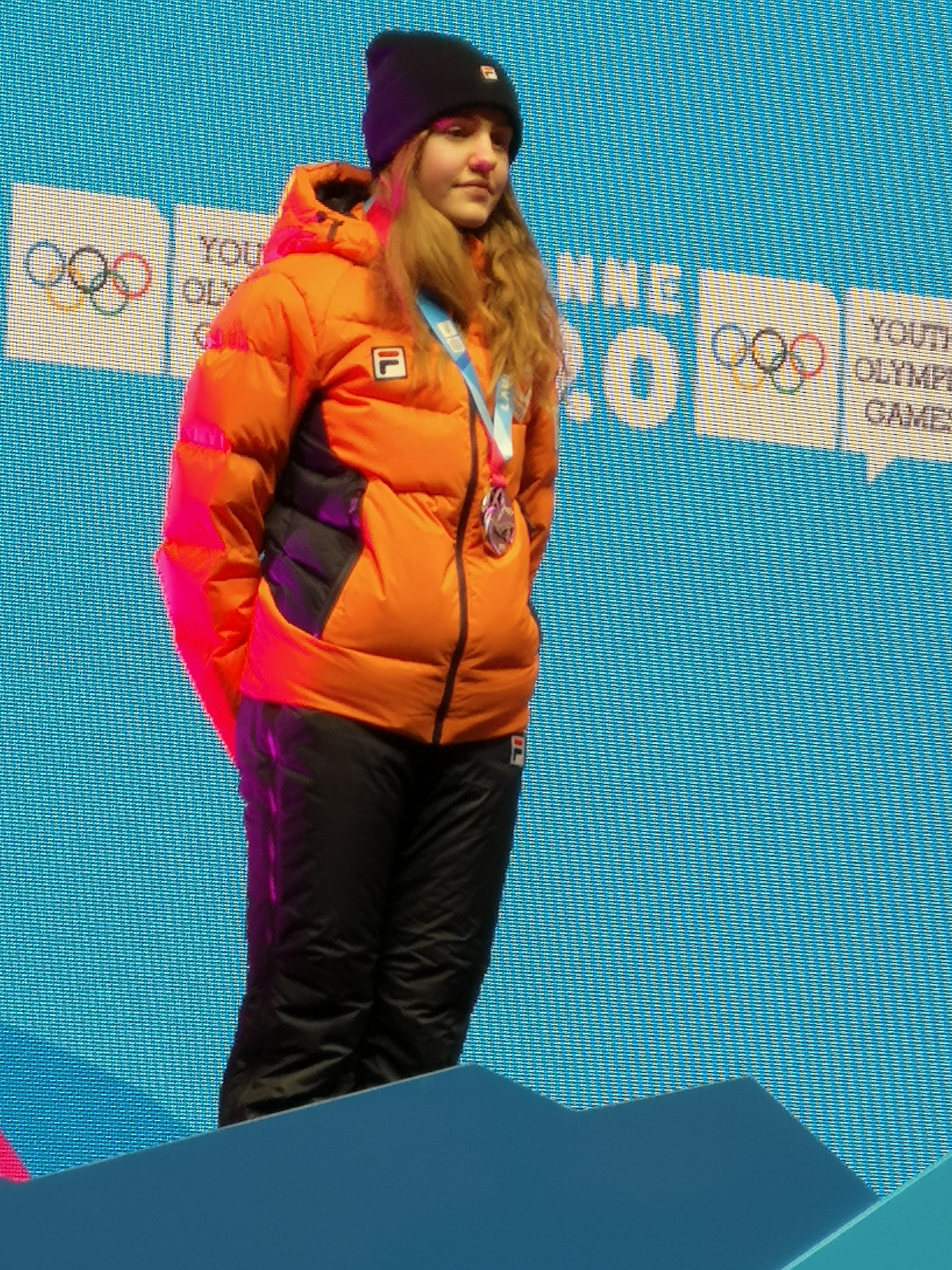

Personal information
- Nationality: Dutch
- Born: 9 March 2003 (age 23) Culemborg, Netherlands

Sport
- Country: Netherlands
- Sport: Short track speed skating
Medal record
Women's short-track speed skating
Representing the Netherlands
World Championships
Gold medal – first place	2023 Seoul	3000 m relay
Gold medal – first place	2024 Rotterdam	3000 m relay
Gold medal – first place	2026 Montreal	3000 m relay
Bronze medal – third place	2025 Beijing	3000 m relay
European Championships
Gold medal – first place	2023 Gdańsk	3000 m relay
Gold medal – first place	2026 Tilburg	3000 m relay
Gold medal – first place	2026 Tilburg	2000 m mixed relay
Silver medal – second place	2025 Dresden	2000 m mixed relay
Silver medal – second place	2026 Tilburg	500 m
Silver medal – second place	2026 Tilburg	1000 m
World Junior Championships
Silver medal – second place	2022 Gdańsk	3000 m relay
Bronze medal – third place	2022 Gdansk	500 m
Youth Olympic Games
Silver medal – second place	2020 Lausanne	500m

Michelle Velzeboer (born 9 March 2003) is a Dutch short track speed skater. She is member of the Dutch team that won the 3000 meter relay event at the World Championships in 2023 and 2024.

== Biography ==
Michelle is the second child of Mark Velzeboer and his wife Carianne. Her older sister Xandra Velzeboer and her aunts Simone and Monique are also short track speed skaters. Velzeboer started short track speed skating at age 6, with her father as the trainer. She studies psychology at the Open Universiteit.

== Career ==
Velzeboer participated in the 2020 Youth Olympic Games and the 2022 World Junior Championships.

In 2022 she was selected for the Dutch national team. In 2023 and 2024 Velzeboer was part of the relay team that won the gold medal at the World Championships.

In 2025 Velzeboer became Dutch national champion at the 500, 1000 and 1500 meters.
