= Murielle Leyssieux =

French speed skater (born 1966)

Personal information
- Nationality: French
- Born: 21 July 1966 (age 58); Grenoble, France

Sport
- Sport: Short track speed skating

Murielle Leyssieux (born 21 July 1966) is a French short track speed skater. She competed in the women's 3000 metre relay event at the 1992 Winter Olympics.
