= Zhang Yanmei =

Chinese speed skater

Medal record

Women's short track speed skating

Representing China

Olympic Games
Silver medal – second place	1994 Lillehammer	500 m

Asian Winter Games
Gold medal – first place	1990 Sapporo	3000 m
Gold medal – first place	1990 Sapporo	3000 m relay
Silver medal – second place	1990 Sapporo	500 m
Silver medal – second place	1990 Sapporo	1500 m

Zhang Yanmei (Chinese: 张艳梅, born October 26, 1970) is a female Chinese short track speed skater. She competed in the 1992 Winter Olympics and in the 1994 Winter Olympics.

== Biography ==
Zhang was born in Shulan, Jilin, China. In 1992, she was a member of the Chinese relay team in the 3000 m relay competition. She also competed in the 500 m event.

Zhang won a silver medal in the 500 m competition, accusing gold medal winner Cathy Turner of the U.S. of grabbing her leg during the race before stalking off the ceremonial stand, taking her medal off, and flinging her flower bouquet to the ground. Zhang in her protest was saying she felt Turner should have been disqualified for her move and she been awarded the gold medal. This drew a mixed reaction from the fans, some who jeered her display of poor sportsmanship, and others who applauded her taking a stand against Turner's controversial skating style and win.

She also finished eighth in the 3000m relay event.
