= Tamara Kaszala =

Hungarian speed skater

Personal information
- Nationality: Hungarian
- Born: 29 November 1975 (age 49); Budapest, Hungary

Sport
- Sport: Short track speed skating

Tamara Kaszala (born 29 November 1975) is a Hungarian short track speed skater. She competed in the women's 500 metres event at the 1992 Winter Olympics.
