= Li Changxiang =

Chinese speed skater

Personal information
- Nationality: Chinese
- Born: 2 July 1971 (age 53)

Sport
- Sport: Short track speed skating

Li Changxiang (born 2 July 1971) is a Chinese short track speed skater. She competed in the women's 3000 metre relay event at the 1992 Winter Olympics.
