= Mie Naito =

Japanese speed skater (born 1976)

Personal information
- Nationality: Japanese
- Born: 13 October 1976 (age 48); Nagano, Japan

Sport
- Sport: Short track speed skating

Mie Naito (内藤 三恵, Naitō Mie, born 13 October 1976) is a Japanese short track speed skater. She competed in the women's 3000 metre relay event at the 1992 Winter Olympics.
