= Simone Velzeboer =

Dutch speed skater

Personal information
- Nationality: Dutch
- Born: 15 April 1967 (age 58) Oud Ade, Netherlands

Sport
- Sport: Short track speed skating

Simone Velzeboer (born 15 April 1967) is a Dutch short track speed skater.

She won medals at four different world championships in the 1980s and 1990s.

She competed in two events at the 1992 Winter Olympics. Earlier she already participated in short track events at the 1988 Winter Olympics where it was a demonstration event.

Simone Velzeboer is the sister of short track speed skaters Monique Velzeboer, Mark Velzeboer and Alexander Velzeboer. Her nieces Xandra Velzeboer and Michelle Velzeboer (the daughters of Marc Velzeboer) are also short track speed skaters.
