= Karine Rubini =

French speed skater (born 1970)

Personal information
- Nationality: French
- Born: 11 October 1970 (age 54); Montreuil-sous-Bois, France

Sport
- Sport: Short track speed skating

Karine Rubini (born 11 October 1970) is a French short track speed skater. She competed in two events at the 1992 Winter Olympics.
