= Viktoriya Troytskaya =

Short track speed skater

Olympic medal record

Women's Short Track Speed Skating
Bronze medal – third place	1992 Albertville	3000 m relay

Viktoriya Troytskaya (née Taranina, Russian: Виктория Троицкая, née Таранина; born April 18, 1969) is a Russian short track speed skater who competed for the Unified Team in the 1992 Winter Olympics and for Russia in the 1994 Winter Olympics.

In 1992 she was a member of the relay team for the Unified Team which won the bronze medal in the 3000 metre relay competition. In the 500 m event she finished 17th.

Two years later she finished fifth with the Russian relay team in the 3000 metre relay contest. In the 500 m competition she finished 20th and in the 1000 m event she finished 29th.
