= Monique Velzeboer =

Dutch speed skater

Medal record

Women's short track speed skating

Representing Netherlands

Olympic Games
Gold medal – first place	1988 Calgary	500 m
Silver medal – second place	1988 Calgary	1500 m
Bronze medal – third place	1988 Calgary	1000 m

Monique Cornelia Annamaria Velzeboer (born in Oud Ade on 18 October 1969) is a Dutch skater and photographer.

At the Winter Olympics in Calgary in 1988 she won Gold, silver and bronze in the short track skating discipline, when short-track speed skating was held as a demonstration sport. She ranked also 4th in the 500 metres of the 1992 Winter Olympics. Her life as an sport star ended early, during a training for the 1994 Winter Olympics Monique had a bad fall in Font-Romeu and she broke both her wrists and became paraplegic.

Monique as a photographer, travels around the world to photograph, she has been in Mexico, India, Rwanda, Bangladesh and Nepal. Monique photographs for the Liliane Fund, a Fund which is committed to children with disabilities in developing countries. Through the Monique Velzeboer Foundation, she sells photos, calendars, cards and the proceeds are going to the Liliane Fund.

Her three siblings, Simone, Mark and Alex were also speed skaters. As are her nieces Xandra and Michelle.
