= Short-track speed skating at the 1992 Winter Olympics =

Short track speed skating at the XVI Olympic Winter Games
- Pictogram for short track speed skating
- Venue: La halle de glace Olympique
- Dates: 18–22 February
- Competitors: 86 from 16 nations

Short track speed skating at the 1992 Winter Olympics was held from 18 to 22 February. Four events were contested at La halle de glace Olympique, located next to the Théâtre des Cérémonies, a couple of kilometers west of downtown Albertville. After it was a 1988 demonstration event, it was the first time short track speed skating was contested at the Winter Olympics.

== Medal summary ==
=== Medal table ===
Rank	Nation	Gold	Silver	Bronze	Total
1	South Korea	2	0	1	3
2	Canada	1	2	0	3
3	United States	1	1	0	2
4	China	0	1	0	1
5	Japan	0	0	1	1
5	North Korea	0	0	1	1
5	Unified Team	0	0	1	1
Totals (7 entries)		4	4	4	12

South Korea led the medal table with three, including two golds. Kim Ki-hoon's gold medal in the men's 1000 metre was the first Winter gold medal for South Korea. Kim also led the individual medal table, with two gold medals. The top women's medalist was American Cathy Turner, who won one gold and one silver.

=== Men's events ===
Event	Gold		Silver		Bronze	
1000 metres	Kim Ki-hoon; South Korea	1:30.76	Frédéric Blackburn; Canada	1:31.11	Lee Joon-ho; South Korea	1:31.16
5000 metre relay	South Korea; Song Jae-kun; Kim Ki-hoon; Lee Joon-ho; Mo Ji-soo	7:14.02	Canada; Mark Lackie; Frédéric Blackburn; Michel Daignault; Laurent Daignault; Sylvain Gagnon	7:14.06	Japan; Yuichi Akasaka; Tatsuyoshi Ishihara; Toshinobu Kawai; Tsutomu Kawasaki	7:18.18

=== Women's events ===
Event	Gold		Silver		Bronze	
500 metres	Cathy Turner; United States	47.04	Li Yan; China	47.08	Hwang Ok-Sil; North Korea	47.23
3000 metre relay	Canada; Angela Cutrone; Sylvie Daigle; Nathalie Lambert; Annie Perreault	4:36.62	United States; Darcie Dohnal; Amy Peterson; Cathy Turner; Nikki Ziegelmeyer	4:39.34	Unified Team; Yuliya Allagulova; Nataliya Isakova; Viktoriya Troitskaya-Taranina; Yuliya Vlasova	4:42.69

== Participating NOCs ==
Sixteen nations competed in the short track events at Albertville.

- Australia (6)
- Belgium (5)
- Canada (9)
- China (5)
- Unified Team (6)
- France (8)
- Great Britain (5)
- Hungary (2)
- Italy (8)
- Japan (8)
- South Korea (6)
- Netherlands (5)
- New Zealand (5)
- Norway (1)
- North Korea (3)
- United States (5)
