= Hwang Ok-sil =

Short track speed skater (born 1972)

Medal record

Women's short track speed skating

Representing North Korea

Olympic Games
Bronze medal – third place	1992 Albertville	500 m

- Hwang Ok-sil
- Hangul: 황옥실
- RR: Hwang Oksil
- MR: Hwang Oksil

Hwang Ok-sil (born 25 March 1972 in Pyongyang) is a North Korean short track speed skater, who won bronze in the 500 m at the 1992 Winter Olympics.
