= Li Yan (speed skater) =

Short track speed skater

Medal record

Women's short track speed skating

Representing China

Olympic Games
Silver medal – second place	1992 Albertville	500 m

Olympic Games (Demonstration)
Gold medal – first place	1988 Calgary	1000m
Bronze medal – third place	1988 Calgary	1500m
Bronze medal – third place	1988 Calgary	500m

Asian Winter Games
Bronze medal – third place	1990 Sapporo	1500 m

Li Yan (Chinese: 李琰; pinyin: Lǐ Yǎn; Mandarin pronunciation: [lì jɛ̀n]; born September 18, 1968) is a Chinese speed skating and short track speed skating coach, also a retired skater. She competed in the 1988 and 1992 Winter Olympics for China. She coached Slovakia for a short time the Club USSV in Vienna and the United States. After the 2006 Winter Olympic Games, she came back to China and became the head coach of Chinese national short track speed skating team. In 2010 and 2014 Winter Olympic Games, her team won 6 gold, 3 silver and 1 bronze medals in total. On May 16, 2014, a press release provided by the Chinese Skating Association announced that "Li would remain as the head coach of the Chinese short track team until the Pyeongchang Games".

== Athletic career ==
She was born in the city of Dalian in Liaoning Province. and as she was two years old, moved to Baoquanling collective farm in Heilongjiang where her father worked as a military officer. She attended the local school, which maintained a speed skating team. From that team she was recruited to attend a sports school in Jiamusi in 1979. According to her coach in Jiamusi, He Peicheng, Li trained very hard and could withstand extremely cold temperatures. "She would cry but she would finish all of her exercises." In 1982, she finished second at a national youth speed skating competition.

Li joined China's national short track speed skating team in 1987. In 1988, when short track speed skating first appeared at the Winter Olympics in Calgary as a demonstration sport, she competed and won the 1000m and finished third in the 500m and 1500m events.

In 1992, after short skating sport became an official Olympic sport in Albertville, she won the silver medal in the 500m event, finishing 0.04 s behind Cathy Turner of the United States. It was the third ever medal for China at the Winter Olympic Games. Li was also a member of the Chinese women's short track relay team that finished eighth.

Li retired from the sport after 14 years and attended Dongbei University of Finance and Economics in Dalian where she majored in international finance. She said she chose the major because the international nature of the subject ensured she could study English and finance was a popular major at the time. After graduation, she worked for the Dalian tax bureau for one and half years.

== Coaching career ==
In 2000, she received a telephone call which asked whether she would be interested in a short track coaching exchange program with Slovakia. Other Chinese coaches had refused to take this opportunity, but Li agreed "after thinking about it for 10 seconds." She became the coach of the Slovak national team from 2000 to 2002 and led the team to qualify for the 2002 Winter Olympics in Salt Lake City.

After the 2002 Winter Olympics, she became the coach for an Austrian short track speed skating club in Vienna. Shortly after, Li Yan joined U.S. Speedskating's staff in January 2003 as the Short Track Development Coach based at the U.S. Olympic Education Center in Marquette, Michigan. She became the U.S. National Team Coach in June 2003, which is based in Colorado Springs. In 2005, she was named the U.S. Speedskating's coach of the Year after guiding the U.S. men's team to an eighth-place finish at the World Cup and the women's team to the sixth-place finish. The team combined to win 30 World Cup medals. At the 2006 Winter Olympics in Turin, Li's student Apolo Anton Ohno won gold in the men's 500m.

In 2006, she signed a four-year contract to coach the Chinese national short track speed skating team. Under her supervision, the talented but temperamental Wang Meng obtained great improvement by breaking the world record of 500m repeatedly. Moreover, a young star in Zhou Yang was fostered and dominated the fields of 1000m and 1500m of women short track speed skating during the time of 2008 to 2010. At the 2010 Winter Olympics in Vancouver, Wang Meng won the 500m and 1000m gold, while Zhou won the 1500m gold. The Chinese women's team won the 3000m short track relay, after the South Korean team was disqualified for impeding. The Chinese women's team completed an unprecedented sweep of all four short track speed skating events at the Olympics. The four gold medals her team won made Li the most decorated Chinese coach in one Olympic game.

In May 2010, she renewed a four-year contract as coach of the Chinese short track speed skating team.

== Personal ==
Li Yan is married to Tang Guoliang, a former Chinese skier. They have one daughter and maintain a residence in Colorado. Her family is moving back to China in 2010 following her contract extension with the Chinese national team.
