= Baoquanling =

Baoquanling is a district located in the northeast of Heilongjiang Province, China. Heilongjiang and joins Songhua River triangle. North to Heilongjiang and Russia for the sector, the border line of 160 kilometers. South to Songhua River from the southwest to the northeast to flow through, west of Xingan mountains, is located in Harbin, Hegang Jia Musi, three cities and Suibin, Luobei, Yilan, tangyuan Counties, the total area of 6115 square kilometers. It is a famous Agricultural area of Heilongjiang Province.
