= Marina Pylayeva =

Russian speed skater

Personal information
- Nationality: Russian
- Born: 12 August 1966 (age 58); Syktyvkar, Russia

Sport
- Sport: Short track speed skating

Marina Pylayeva (born 12 August 1966) is a Russian short track speed skater. She competed at the 1992 Winter Olympics, the 1994 Winter Olympics and the 1998 Winter Olympics.
