= Yuliya Vlasova =

Russian speed skater (born 1967)

Olympic medal record

Women's Short Track Speed Skating
Bronze medal – third place	1992 Albertville	3000 m relay

Yuliya Ivanovna Vlasova (Russian: Юлия Ивановна Власова; born May 1, 1967) is a Russian short track speed skater who competed for the Unified Team in the 1992 Winter Olympics.

She was a member of the Unified squad's relay squad that won the bronze medal in the 3000 metre relay competition in 1992. In the 500m event she finished seventh.
