= La halle de glace Olympique =

Indoor arena in Albertville, France

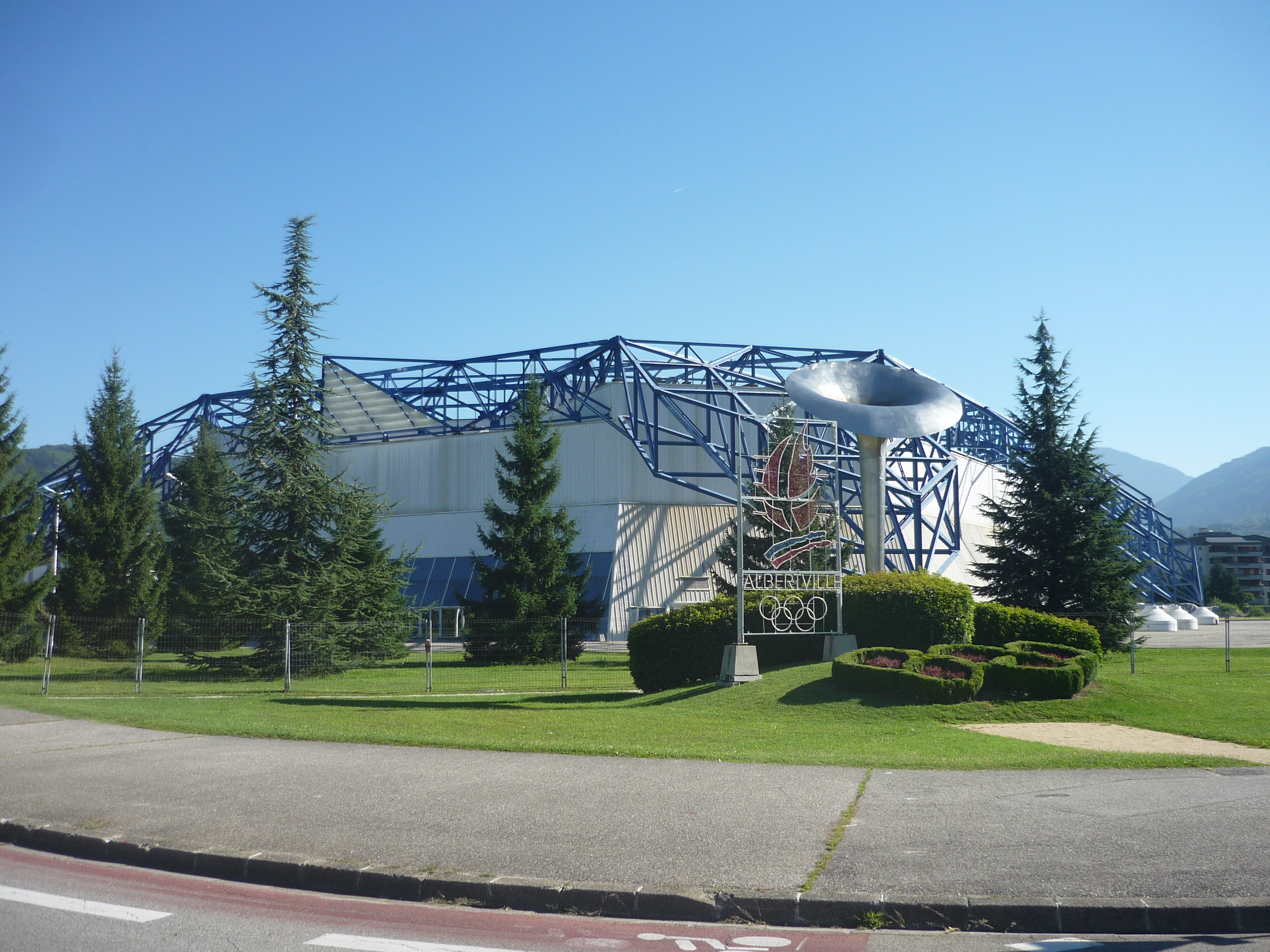
- Interactive map of La halle de glace Olympique
- Location: Albertville, France
- Coordinates: 45°39′49″N 6°22′25″E
- Capacity: 5,500

Construction
- Opened: 1991
- Renovated: 2015

Halle Olympique (French: Olympic Hall) is an indoor arena located in Albertville, France. For the 1992 Winter Olympics, it hosted the figure skating and the short track speed skating events. It was first use for the 1991 Trophée Lalique, which was staged as a test event for the Olympics. The venue also hosted selected matches of the 2017 World Men's Handball Championship.

== Construction ==
The site was constructed on ten internal pillars. Its ice was laid down on 14 cm (5.5 in) foundation, then 7 cm (2.8 in) of insulation, 7 cm (2.8 in) of screed, and finally, 4 cm (1.6 in) of ice. The ice temperature was kept between −4 and −7 °C (25 and 19 °F) depending upon the sporting discipline. The Halle Olympique underwent a major overhaul in 2014 and was reopened the following spring.

== In fiction ==
In the film, I, Tonya, the scenes which take place in La halle de glace Olympique have not been shot in Albertville, but in the Macon Coliseum in Macon, Georgia.

== See also ==
- List of indoor arenas in France
