= Rie Sato (speed skater) =

Japanese speed skater (born 1972)

Personal information
- Nationality: Japanese
- Born: 24 May 1972 (age 52); Kanagawa, Japan

Sport
- Sport: Short track speed skating

Rie Sato (佐藤 利江, Satō Rie, born 24 May 1972) is a Japanese short track speed skater. She competed in the women's 3000 metre relay event at the 1992 Winter Olympics.
