= Yuliya Allagulova =

Short-track speed skater (born 1972)

Olympic medal record

Women's Short Track Speed Skating
Bronze medal – third place	1992 Albertville	3000 m relay

Yuliya Yakunovna Allagulova (Russian: Юлия Аллагулова; born June 25, 1972) is a Russian short track speed skater who competed for the Unified Team in the 1992 Winter Olympics.

In 1992 she was a member of the relay team for the Unified Team which won the bronze medal in the 3000 metre relay competition.
