= Karen Gardiner-Kah =

Australian speed skater

Personal information
- Nationality: Australian
- Born: 17 May 1960 (age 65) Adelaide, Australia

Sport
- Sport: Short track speed skating

Karen Gardiner-Kah (born 17 May 1960) is an Australian short track speed skater and long track speed skater.

== Career ==
She competed in short track speed skating at the 1992 Winter Olympics and the 1994 Winter Olympics.

Gardiner represented her nation twice at the World Allround Speed Skating Championships for Women. In 1986, finishing 30th overall and in 1987, finishing 28th overall. She competed at World Sprint Speed Skating Championships for Women in 1987 (30th overall). She also competed at other international competitions, including at ISU Speed Skating World Cups.

She set a total of 15 national records in 1986 and 1987.

== Personal life ==
She is married to fellow Australian speed skater John Kah. Their daughter Jamie Melham is a leading jockey.

Personal records
Women's speed skating
Event	Result	Date	Location	Notes
500 m	45,42	17.01.1987	Davos	
1000 m	1.32,30	06.01.1987	Inzell	
1500 m	2.18,13	17.01.1987	Davos	
3000 m	4.51,69	18.01.1987	Davos	
