= Natalya Isakova =

Short track speed skater

Olympic medal record

Women's Short Track Speed Skating
Bronze medal – third place	1992 Albertville	3000 m relay

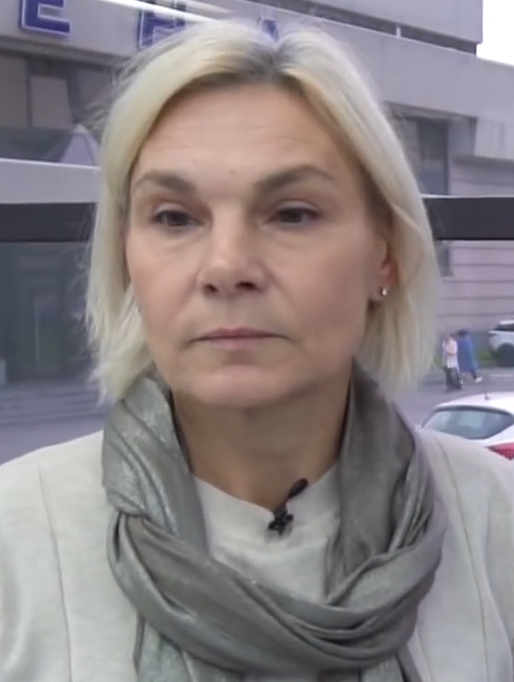
Natalya Komiachilova (Isakova) in October 2019

Natalya Isakova (Russian: Наталья Исакова, born October 23, 1966) is a Russian short track speed skater who competed for the Unified Team in the 1992 Winter Olympics.

In 1992 she was a member of the relay team for the Unified Team which won the bronze medal in the 3000 metre relay competition. In the 500 m event she finished 17th.
