= Nikki Ziegelmeyer =

American short track speed skater

Personal information
- Full name: Nicole Ziegelmeyer
- Born: September 24, 1975 (age 50) Imperial, Missouri, U.S.
Medal record
Women's short track speed skating
Representing the United States
Olympic Games
Silver medal – second place	1992 Albertville	3000 m relay
Bronze medal – third place	1994 Lillehammer	3000 m relay

Nicole "Nikki" Ziegelmeyer (born September 24, 1975) is an American short track speed skater who competed in the 1992 Winter Olympics and 1994 Winter Olympics.

She was born in Imperial, Missouri, and she graduated from Windsor Senior High in 1993, becoming a Hall of Fame inductee in 2006.

She was a member of the American relay team at the 1992 Olympics in Albertville, France, which won the silver medal in the 3000 metre relay competition.

Two years later she won the bronze medal with the American team in the 3000 metre relay event.

Ziegelmeyer planned to compete for the 1998 Winter Olympic Games in Nagano, Japan, but suffered a severe break to her back when she fell to the ice and skidded into the boards at 35 mph during a training session in Lake Placid, New York, in 1997. Doctors weren't optimistic that she would ever walk again, but she recovered enough to walk eight weeks after surgery. She decided upon a broadcasting career but started her own residential and commercial painting company, Elite Painting Inc., instead. She attempted a comeback for the 2002 Winter Olympics Games in Salt Lake City, Utah, in July 2000, but retired again on the day before she was to report to training camp. She ran her painting business for nine years and now owns Casa Di Vino wine bar in Imperial.
