= Cathy Turner =

Short track speed skater Olympian from Rochester, NY

Personal information
- Born: Cathy Ann Turner; April 10, 1962 (age 64) Rochester, New York, U.S.
Medal record
Women's short track speed skating
Representing the United States
Olympic Games
Gold medal – first place	1992 Albertville	500 m
Gold medal – first place	1994 Lillehammer	500 m
Silver medal – second place	1992 Albertville	3000 m relay
Bronze medal – third place	1994 Lillehammer	3000 m relay

Cathy Ann Turner (born April 10, 1962, in Rochester, New York) is an American short track speed skater, who won gold medals at the 1992 Winter Olympics and 1994 Winter Olympics.

Turner was the American short-track champion in 1979, but short-track speed skating was not then an Olympic discipline, and in 1980 she left skating to pursue a career as a singer. She sang in bands, shows and then began writing her own songs. She became a studio singer and songwriter under the stage name Nikki Newland. After short-track was exhibited at the 1988 Winter Olympics, she decided to return to the sport. " After nine years away from her sports, she resumed training. She qualified for the Albertville Olympics, where she won the 500-meter short track race and was a member of the silver medal-winning 3000-meter relay team.

Turner retired from competitive skating after the 1992 Games to star with the Ice Capades as a singer and skater in the "Made In America" tour, but then returned yet again for the 1994 Games. She won another gold in the 500 meters in a controversial race in which silver medalist Zhang Yanmei accused Turner of grabbing her leg as Turner passed her; however, the judges did not see it that way. Turner was disqualified from the 1000-meter race when accused of impeding a South Korean skater Kim So-hee in a heat. She took a bronze in the 3000-meter team relay. Turner then placed fifth in the 3000-meter relay at the 1998 Winter Olympics in Nagano.

Turner now lives in Parma, New York and works as a Database Administrator at Paychex Inc., a motivational speaker, and a product spokesperson. She has also been a skating commentator for ESPN. Turner holds a bachelor's degree in computer science from Northern Michigan University, and is a contributor to the book Awaken The Olympian Within, among others.
