= Darcie Dohnal =

Short-track speed skater

Personal information
- Born: June 28, 1972 (age 53)
Medal record
Women's short track speed skating
Representing the United States
Olympic Games
Silver medal – second place	1992 Albertville	3000 m relay

Darcie Dohnal (later Sharapova; born June 28, 1972) is an American short track speed skater who competed in the 1992 Winter Olympics.

At the age of 10 she began skating in Wauwatosa, Wisconsin, her hometown. In 1992 she was a member of the American relay team which won the silver medal in the 3000 metre relay competition.
