= Short-track speed skating at the Winter Olympics =

- IOC Code: STK
- Governing body: ISU
- Events: 9 (men: 4; women: 4; mixed: 1)

Winter Olympics
- 1924; 1928; 1932; 1936; 1948; 1952; 1956; 1960; 1964; 1968; 1972; 1976; 1980; 1984; 1988; 1992; 1994; 1998; 2002; 2006; 2010; 2014; 2018; 2022; 2026; Note: demonstration or exhibition sport years indicated in italics
- Medalists; Records

Short-track speed skating has been a contest at the Winter Olympics since the 1992 Winter Games in Albertville, France. Prior to that, it was a demonstration sport at the 1988 games. The results from the 1988 demonstration competition are not included in the official Olympic statistics. The sport has been dominated by South Korea, which leads the medal tally with 53 medals including 26 golds since 1992. The majority of medals that South Korea have won at the Winter Olympics come from short-track speed skating.

At the 2010 Winter Olympics, Haralds Silovs of Latvia became the first athlete in Olympic history to participate in both short track (1500m) and long track (5000m) speed skating, and the first to compete in two disciplines on the same day. After winning the 500m event at the 2014 Winter Olympics, Viktor Ahn became the first short track speedskater to have won gold medals in all four short track disciplines (500m, 1000m, 1500m, 5000m-relay). He had won 3 golds in 2014 representing Russia, and 3 in 2006 representing South Korea.

In July 2018, the International Olympic Committee (IOC) officially added the mixed relay held over a distance of 2000 metres, increasing the total number of events to nine. Due to the addition of the event, the competition schedule was increased to six days from five.

== Summary ==
Games	Year	Events	Best nation
1 → 14			
15	1988	10	Netherlands (1)
16	1992	4	South Korea (1)
17	1994	6	South Korea (2)
18	1998	6	South Korea (3)
19	2002	8	China (1)

Games	Year	Events	Best nation
20	2006	8	South Korea (4)
21	2010	8	China (2)
22	2014	8	Russia (1)
23	2018	8	South Korea (5)
24	2022	9	South Korea (6)
25	2026	9	Netherlands (2)

== Events ==
=== Men's ===
• = official event, (d) = demonstration event

Event	24	28	32	36	48	52	56	60	64	68	72	76	80	84	88	92	94	98	02	06	10	14	18	22	26	Years
500 metres															(d)		•	•	•	•	•	•	•	•	•	9
1000 metres															(d)	•	•	•	•	•	•	•	•	•	•	10
1500 metres															(d)				•	•	•	•	•	•	•	7
3000 metres															(d)											0
5000-metre relay															(d)	•	•	•	•	•	•	•	•	•	•	10
Total events															5	2	3	3	4	4	4	4	4	4	4	

=== Women's ===
• = official event, (d) = demonstration event

Event	24	28	32	36	48	52	56	60	64	68	72	76	80	84	88	92	94	98	02	06	10	14	18	22	26	Years
500 metres															(d)	•	•	•	•	•	•	•	•	•	•	10
1000 metres															(d)		•	•	•	•	•	•	•	•	•	9
1500 metres															(d)				•	•	•	•	•	•	•	7
3000 metres															(d)											0
3000-metre relay															(d)	•	•	•	•	•	•	•	•	•	•	10
Total events															5	2	3	3	4	4	4	4	4	4	4	

=== Mixed ===
• = official event, (d) = demonstration event

Event	24	28	32	36	48	52	56	60	64	68	72	76	80	84	88	92	94	98	02	06	10	14	18	22	26	Years
2000-metre relay																								•	•	2
Total events																								1	1	

== Medal table ==
Accurate as of 2026 Winter Olympics.

Rank	Nation	Gold	Silver	Bronze	Total
1	South Korea	28	19	13	60
2	China	12	17	9	38
3	Canada	11	15	16	42
4	Netherlands	8	4	4	16
5	Italy	4	8	7	19
6	United States	4	7	10	21
7	Russia	3	1	1	5
8	Hungary	2	0	2	4
9	Japan	1	0	2	3
10	Australia	1	0	1	2
11	Bulgaria	0	2	1	3
12	ROC	0	1	1	2
13	Belgium	0	0	2	2
14	Great Britain	0	0	1	1
14	Latvia	0	0	1	1
14	North Korea	0	0	1	1
14	Olympic Athletes from Russia	0	0	1	1
14	Unified Team	0	0	1	1
Totals (18 entries)		74	74	74	222

=== Notes ===
- Viktor Ahn, with 6 gold medals, has the most Olympic golds in short track.
- Italian Arianna Fontana, with fourteen medals among the women's and Viktor Ahn and Apolo Anton Ohno among the men's, with eight medals each have the most Olympic medals in short track.

== Number of athletes by nation ==
Nation	24	28	32	36	48	52	56	60	64	68	72	76	80	84	88	92	94	98	02	06	10	14	18	22	26	Years
Individual Neutral Athletes																									2	1
Australia																6	5	5	5	6	2	2	2	1	1	10
Austria																					1	1			1	3
Belarus																			1	1		2	1			4
Belgium																5	4		4	2	1		2	2	6	8
Bulgaria																	1	2	7	1	3					5
Canada																9	8	8	10	10	10	10	10	10	10	10
China																5	8	8	9	8	10	10	10	10	10	10
Croatia																								1	2	2
Czech Republic																			1	1	1	2	1	1	1	7
Unified Team																6										1
France																8	5	2	4	6	7	4	4	4	6	10
Germany																		5	7	10	5	2	2	1		7
Great Britain																5	3	5	5	4	7	5	5	3	1	10
Hong Kong																			2	1	1	1		1	2	6
Hungary																2			6	4	6	8	10	7	6	7
Israel																			1			1	1	1		4
Italy																8	9	9	10	9	9	10	7	10	10	10
Japan																8	5	11	10	10	8	8	10	7	9	10
Kazakhstan																	1				1	6	7		4	5
South Korea																6	7	9	10	10	9	10	10	10	10	10
Latvia																				1	1	1	2	2	2	6
Lithuania																						1				1
Mongolia																	1	2	2							3
Netherlands																5	5	5	1	3	7	10	10	10	10	10
New Zealand																4	4		1		1					4
Norway																1	5									2
Poland																		1	1	1	3	1	3	6	5	8
North Korea																3		6		2			2			4
Romania																			1	1	1					3
South Africa																	1									1
Russia																	6	2	2	3	5	10	7	10		8
Singapore																							1			1
Slovakia																			1	1		1			1	4
Sweden																	1	1	1							3
Chinese Taipei																						1				1
Turkey																								1	2	2
Ukraine																		2	1	1		1		1	2	6
United States																5	8	11	8	10	10	8	8	7	8	10
Uzbekistan																									1	1
Nations	-	-	-	-	-	-	-	-	-	-	-	-	-	-	-	16	19	18	26	24	23	25	22	22	23	
Athletes	-	-	-	-	-	-	-	-	-	-	-	-	-	-	-	86	87	94	111	106	109	116	115	112	112	
Year	24	28	32	36	48	52	56	60	64	68	72	76	80	84	88	92	94	98	02	06	10	14	18	22	26	

== See also ==
- List of Olympic venues in short track speed skating
