= Nobuko Yamada =

Japanese speed skater (born 1971)

Personal information
- Nationality: Japanese
- Born: 4 August 1971 (age 54) Fukuoka, Japan

Sport
- Sport: Short track speed skating

Nobuko Yamada (山田 乃玞子, Yamada Nobuko; born 4 August 1971) is a Japanese short track speed skater. She competed at the 1988, 1992, 1998, 2002 and the 2006 Winter Olympics.

Her daughter, Kei, is a competitive figure skater.
