= Amy Peterson =

American short track speed skater

Personal information
- Born: November 29, 1971 (age 54) Maplewood, Minnesota, U.S.
- Height: 5 ft 4 in (163 cm)
Medal record
Women's short track speed skating
Representing the United States
Olympic Games
Silver medal – second place	1992 Albertville	3000 metre relay
Bronze medal – third place	1994 Lillehammer	500 metres
Bronze medal – third place	1994 Lillehammer	3000 metre relay

Amy Peterson (born November 29, 1971) is an American short track speed skater. Peterson competed in five consecutive Olympic games from when short track speed skating was exhibition sport in 1988 to 2002.

Peterson qualified for her first Olympic Games in 1988 for the 1988 Winter Olympics in Calgary at age 16. In 1988 short track speed skating was just a demonstration sport and no medals were awarded. Peterson won the 1,000 meters, and 1,500 meters US speed skating titles at the U.S. Olympic Festival in 1989. She also placed third in the 500 meters.

Peterson was born in Maplewood, Minnesota. She attended Johnson Senior High School in Saint Paul, Minnesota and graduated in 1990. Her uncle, Gene Sandvig, competed in speed skating in the 1952 and 1956 Olympic Games.

Peterson returned to qualify for the 1998 Winter Olympics in Nagano, Japan after overcoming chronic fatigue syndrome. Peterson's performance suffered during the time with her dropping from the number one U.S. woman to eighth.

In 2000, Peterson won all four distances at U.S. short track speed skating championships. Peterson qualified for the 2000 Winter Goodwill Games while winning the 500, 1,000, 1,500 and 3,000 meter races. She held the American record in 1,000, 1,500 and 3,000 meters races in June 2000. In 2001, she won her eighth U.S. women's championship.

By the end of the 2000–2001 season Peterson was ranked ninth in the world and ranked in the top ten for each distance.

In the 2002 Winter Olympics in Salt Lake City, Utah, Peterson was elected to carry the US flag at the opening ceremony of the 2002 Winter Olympics. She planned for the Olympics to be her last one. Peterson failed to win a medal in any of her individual events or in the relay.

Peterson failed to qualify for her sixth Olympic games in 2005.

== Family ==
Her mother, Joan Sandvig, was a speed skater competing at national level. Her uncle Gene Sandvig competed in speed skating at the 1956 Winter Olympics. The daughter of Gene, Susan Sandvig was also a speed skater who competed at international level.

Olympic Games
Preceded by Cliff Meidl	Flagbearer for United States; Salt Lake City 2002	Succeeded by Dawn Staley
