= Mark Velzeboer =

Dutch speed skater

Personal information
- Nationality: Dutch
- Born: 29 October 1968 (age 56); Oud Ade, Netherlands

Sport
- Sport: Short track speed skating

Mark Velzeboer (born 29 October 1968) is a Dutch short track speed skater. He competed in the men's 1000 metres event at the 1992 Winter Olympics.
