= Angela Cutrone =

Short-track speed skater

Olympic medal record

Women's short track speed skating

Representing Canada
Gold medal – first place	1992 Albertville	3000 m relay

Angela Cutrone (born January 19, 1969) is a Canadian short track speed skater who competed in the 1992 Winter Olympics.

Cutrone was born in Saint-Leonard, Quebec. In 1994, she was qualified as an alternate of the Canadian relay team which won the gold medal in the 3000 metre relay competition, however, and was therefore not awarded a silver medal with the rest of the team at the tournament.
