= Wang Xiulan =

Chinese speed skater

Personal information
- Nationality: Chinese
- Born: 24 November 1971 (age 53)

Sport
- Sport: Short track speed skating

Wang Xiulan (simplified Chinese: 王秀兰; traditional Chinese: 王秀蘭; pinyin: Wáng Xiùlán; born 24 November 1971) is a Chinese short track speed skater. She competed at the 1992 Winter Olympics and the 1994 Winter Olympics.
