= 1993 World Short Track Speed Skating Championships =

The 1993 World Short Track Speed Skating Championships took place between March 26 and 28, 1993, in Beijing, China.

== Participating nations ==
1. Australia (9)
2. Austria (5)
3. Belgium (7)
4. Bulgaria (1)
5. Canada (10)
6. China (10)
7. France (10)
8. Germany (3)
9. Great Britain (6)
10. Hungary (2)
11. Italy (10)
12. Japan (10)
13. Kazakhstan (3)
14. Mongolia (1)
15. Netherlands (10)
16. New Zealand (5)
17. North Korea (10)
18. Norway (6)
19. Romania (1)
20. Russia (9)
21. South Africa (1)
22. South Korea (10)
23. Sweden (2)
24. United States (10)

== Results ==
=== Men ===
| Event | Gold | | Silver | | Bronze | |
|---|---|---|---|---|---|---|
| Overall | Marc Gagnon; Canada | 10 points | Sylvain Gagnon; Canada | 8 points | Chae Ji-hoon; South Korea; Kim Ki-hoon; South Korea | 7 points |
| 500 m | Mirko Vuillermin; Italy | 43.10 | Marc Gagnon; Canada | 43.68 | Andy Gabel; United States | 43.69 |
| 1000 m | Marc Gagnon; Canada | 1:32.84 | Lee Joon-ho; South Korea | 1:33.19 | Sylvain Gagnon; Canada | 1:33.27 |
| 1500 m | Sylvain Gagnon; Canada | 2:30.22 | Kim Ki-hoon; South Korea | 2:30.43 | Chae Ji-hoon; South Korea | 2:30.44 |
| 3000 m | Chae Ji-hoon; South Korea | 5:13.66 | Kim Ki-hoon; South Korea | 5:14.89 | Marc Gagnon; Canada | 5:15.84 |
| 5000 m relay | New Zealand; Andrew Nicholson; Michael McMillen; Chris Nicholson; Matthew Biggs | 7:10.95 | Italy; Orazio Fagone; Hugo Herrnhof; Mirko Vuillermin; Roberto Peretti | 7:11.08 | Australia; Andrew Murtha; Kieran Hansen; Steven Bradbury; John Kah | 7:18.79 |

=== Women ===
| Event | Gold | | Silver | | Bronze | |
|---|---|---|---|---|---|---|
| Overall | Nathalie Lambert; Canada | 15 points | Chun Lee-kyung; South Korea | 6 points | Zhang Yanmei; China | 5 points |
| 500 m | Zhang Yanmei; China | 46.37 | Isabelle Charest; Canada | 47.44 | Angela Cutrone; Canada | 1:08.33 |
| 1000 m | Nathalie Lambert; Canada | 1:39.33 | Li Yan; China | 1:39.88 | Amy Peterson; United States | 1:41.21 |
| 1500 m | Nathalie Lambert; Canada | 2:39.42 | Chun Lee-kyung; South Korea | 2:39.66 | Wang Xiulan; China | 2:39.71 |
| 3000 m | Nathalie Lambert; Canada | 5:45.80 | Chun Lee-kyung; South Korea | 5:45.88 | Wang Xiulan; China | 5:46.14 |
| 3000 m relay | Canada; Nathalie Lambert; Angela Cutrone; Isabelle Charest; Christine Boudrias; Tania Vicent | 4:26.56 | China; Li Yan; Wang Xiulan; Zheng Chunyang; Zhang Jie; Zhang Yanmei | 4:29.36 | South Korea; Kim So-hee; Kim Ryang-hee; Chun Lee-kyung; Lee Yoon-sook | 4:31.25 |

== Medal table ==
* Host nation (China)

| Rank | Nation | Gold | Silver | Bronze | Total |
|---|---|---|---|---|---|
| 1 | Canada (CAN) | 8 | 3 | 3 | 14 |
| 2 | South Korea (KOR) | 1 | 6 | 4 | 11 |
| 3 | China (CHN)* | 1 | 2 | 3 | 6 |
| 4 | Italy (ITA) | 1 | 1 | 0 | 2 |
| 5 | New Zealand (NZL) | 1 | 0 | 0 | 1 |
| 6 | United States (USA) | 0 | 0 | 2 | 2 |
| 7 | Australia (AUS) | 0 | 0 | 1 | 1 |
| Totals (7 entries) | | 12 | 12 | 13 | 37 |
