= Short-track speed skating at the 1992 Winter Olympics – Men's 5000 metre relay =

Men's 5000 metre relay at the XVI Olympic Winter Games
- Pictogram for short track
- Venue: La halle de glace Olympique
- Dates: 18–22 February 1992
- Competitors: 37 from 9 nations
- Winning time: 7:14.02

Medalists
1st place, gold medalist(s)		South Korea; Song Jae-kun; Kim Ki-hoon; Lee Joon-ho; Mo Ji-soo
2nd place, silver medalist(s)		Canada; Frédéric Blackburn; Michel Daignault; Laurent Daignault; Sylvain Gagnon; Mark Lackie
3rd place, bronze medalist(s)		Japan; Yuichi Akasaka; Tatsuyoshi Ishihara; Toshinobu Kawai; Tsutomu Kawasaki

The men's 5000 metre relay in short track speed skating at the 1992 Winter Olympics took place on 18 and 22 February at La halle de glace Olympique.

== Results ==
=== Heats ===
The round one heats were held on 18 February. The top two teams and two fastest third place teams advanced to the semifinals.

Heat 1

Rank	Country	Athlete	Result	Notes
1	South Korea	Song Jae-kun; Kim Ki-hoon; Lee Joon-ho; Mo Ji-soo	7:14.07	Q WR
2	Australia	Kieran Hansen; John Kah; Andrew Murtha; Richard Nizielski	7:15.10	Q
3	Canada	Frédéric Blackburn; Michel Daignault; Laurent Daignault; Sylvain Gagnon	7:15.25	

Heat 2

Rank	Country	Athlete	Result	Notes
1	Great Britain	Nicky Gooch; Stuart Horsepool; Matthew Jasper; Wilf O'Reilly	7:27.87	Q
2	Italy	Orazio Fagone; Hugo Herrnhof; Roberto Peretti; Mirko Vuillermin	7:28.32	Q
3	France	Marc Bella; Arnaud Drouet; Rémi Ingres; Claude Nicouleau	7:38.32	

Heat 3

Rank	Country	Athlete	Result	Notes
1	New Zealand	Mike McMillen; Andrew Nicholson; Chris Nicholson; Tony Smith	7:21.31	Q
2	Japan	Yuichi Akasaka; Tatsuyoshi Ishihara; Toshinobu Kawai; Tsutomu Kawasaki	7:22.43	Q
3	Belgium	Geert Blanchart; Alain De Ruyter; Geert Dejonghe; Franky Vanhooren	8:32.51	

=== Semifinals ===
The semifinals were held on 22 February. The top two teams in each semifinal qualified for the A final, while the third and fourth place teams advanced to the B Final.

Semifinal 1

Rank	Country	Athlete	Result	Notes
1	South Korea	Song Jae-kun; Kim Ki-hoon; Lee Joon-ho; Mo Ji-soo	7:20.57	QA
2	New Zealand	Mike McMillen; Andrew Nicholson; Chris Nicholson; Tony Smith	7:22.38	QA
3	France	Marc Bella; Arnaud Drouet; Rémi Ingres; Claude Nicouleau	7:26.09	QB
4	Australia	Kieran Hansen; John Kah; Andrew Murtha; Richard Nizielski	7:32.57	QB

Semifinal 2

Rank	Country	Athlete	Result	Notes
1	Japan	Yuichi Akasaka; Tatsuyoshi Ishihara; Toshinobu Kawai; Tsutomu Kawasaki	7:22.84	QA
2	Canada	Frédéric Blackburn; Michel Daignault; Laurent Daignault; Sylvain Gagnon	7:24.69	QA
3	Great Britain	Nicky Gooch; Stuart Horsepool; Matthew Jasper; Wilf O'Reilly	7:29.40	QB
4	Italy	Orazio Fagone; Hugo Herrnhof; Roberto Peretti; Mirko Vuillermin	7:32.80	QB

=== Finals ===
The four qualifying teams competed in Final A, while four others raced in Final B.

Final A

Rank	Country	Athlete	Result	Notes
1st place, gold medalist(s)	South Korea	Song Jae-kun; Kim Ki-hoon; Lee Joon-ho; Mo Ji-soo	7:14.02	
2nd place, silver medalist(s)	Canada	Frédéric Blackburn; Michel Daignault; Mark Lackie; Sylvain Gagnon	7:14.06	
3rd place, bronze medalist(s)	Japan	Yuichi Akasaka; Tatsuyoshi Ishihara; Toshinobu Kawai; Tsutomu Kawasaki	7:18.18	
4	New Zealand	Mike McMillen; Andrew Nicholson; Chris Nicholson; Tony Smith	7:18.91	

Final B

Rank	Country	Athlete	Result	Notes
5	France	Marc Bella; Arnaud Drouet; Rémi Ingres; Claude Nicouleau	7:26.09	
6	Great Britain	Nicky Gooch; Stuart Horsepool; Matthew Jasper; Wilf O'Reilly	7:29.46	
7	Australia	Kieran Hansen; John Kah; Andrew Murtha; Richard Nizielski	7:32.57	
8	Italy	Orazio Fagone; Hugo Herrnhof; Roberto Peretti; Mirko Vuillermin	7:32.80	
