= Short-track speed skating at the 1992 Winter Olympics – Men's 1000 metres =

Men's 1000 metres at the XVI Olympic Winter Games
- Pictogram for short track
- Venue: La halle de glace Olympique
- Dates: February 18–20, 1992
- Competitors: 28 from 16 nations
- Winning time: 1:30.76

Medalists
1st place, gold medalist(s)		Kim Ki-hoon	South Korea
2nd place, silver medalist(s)		Frédéric Blackburn	Canada
3rd place, bronze medalist(s)		Lee Joon-ho	South Korea

The men's 1000 metres in short track speed skating at the 1992 Winter Olympics took place from 18 to 20 February at the La halle de glace Olympique.

== Results ==
=== Heats ===
The first round was held on 18 February. There were eight heats, with the top two finishers moving on to the quarterfinals.

Heat 1

Rank	Athlete	Country	Time	Notes
1	Michel Daignault	Canada	1:33.21	Q OR
2	Hugo Herrnhof	Italy	1:33.35	Q
3	Chris Nicholson	New Zealand	1:33.45	
4	Tibor Kun Bálint	Hungary	1:36.86	

Heat 2

Rank	Athlete	Country	Time	Notes
1	Frédéric Blackburn	Canada	1:38.67	Q
2	Tsutomu Kawasaki	Japan	1:38.75	Q
3	Gisle Elvebakken	Norway	1:41.50	
4	Nicky Gooch	Great Britain	2:24.43	

Heat 3

Rank	Athlete	Country	Time	Notes
1	Matthew Jasper	Great Britain	1:36.82	Q
2	Dmitry Yershov	Unified Team	1:37.71	Q
3	Toshinobu Kawai	Japan	1:42.28	
–	Li Won-ho	North Korea	DQ	

Heat 4

Rank	Athlete	Country	Time	Notes
1	Geert Blanchart	Belgium	1:38.66	Q
2	Mark Velzeboer	Netherlands	1:38.74	Q
3	Richard Nizielski	Australia	1:38.80	

Heat 5

Rank	Athlete	Country	Time	Notes
1	Mark Lackie	Canada	1:39.19	Q
2	Lee Joon-ho	South Korea	1:39.30	Q
–	Andy Gabel	United States	DQ	

Heat 6

Rank	Athlete	Country	Time	Notes
1	Wilf O'Reilly	Great Britain	1:37.79	Q
2	Li Lianli	China	1:37.85	Q
3	Song Jae-kun	South Korea	1:37.86	

Heat 7

Rank	Athlete	Country	Time	Notes
1	Kim Ki-hoon	South Korea	1:33.79	Q
2	Tatsuyoshi Ishihara	Japan	1:34.11	Q
3	Andrew Murtha	Australia	1:34.71	

Heat 8

Rank	Athlete	Country	Time	Notes
1	Mike McMillen	New Zealand	1:33.57	Q
2	Alain De Ruyter	Belgium	1:34.18	Q
3	Marc Bella	France	1:34.22	
4	Orazio Fagone	Italy	1:34.91	

=== Quarterfinals ===
The quarterfinals were held on 20 February. The top two finishers in each of the four quarterfinals advanced to the semifinals.

Quarterfinal 1

Rank	Athlete	Country	Time	Notes
1	Lee Joon-ho	South Korea	1:33.51	Q
2	Michel Daignault	Canada	1:33.66	Q
3	Matthew Jasper	Great Britain	1:34.69	
4	Tatsuyoshi Ishihara	Japan	1:34.86	

Quarterfinal 2

Rank	Athlete	Country	Time	Notes
1	Wilf O'Reilly	Great Britain	1:33.62	Q
2	Frédéric Blackburn	Canada	1:33.71	Q
3	Dmitry Yershov	Unified Team	1:34.02	
4	Alain De Ruyter	Belgium	1:34.60	

Quarterfinal 3

Rank	Athlete	Country	Time	Notes
1	Kim Ki-hoon	South Korea	1:32.67	Q
2	Mike McMillen	New Zealand	1:32.69	Q
3	Mark Velzeboer	Netherlands	1:33.86	
4	Li Lianli	China	1:33.90	

Quarterfinal 4

Rank	Athlete	Country	Time	Notes
1	Mark Lackie	Canada	1:34.68	Q
2	Geert Blanchart	Belgium	1:34.83	Q
3	Hugo Herrnhof	Italy	1:34.85	
4	Tsutomu Kawasaki	Japan	1:35.66	

=== Semifinals ===
The semifinals were held on 20 February. The top two finishers in each of the two semifinals qualified for the A final, while the third and fourth place skaters advanced to the B Final.

Semifinal 1

Rank	Athlete	Country	Time	Notes
1	Lee Joon-ho	South Korea	1:31.27	QA
2	Mike McMillen	New Zealand	1:31.60	QA
3	Michel Daignault	Canada	1:32.10	QB
4	Wilf O'Reilly	Great Britain	2:05.04	QB

Semifinal 2

Rank	Athlete	Country	Time	Notes
1	Kim Ki-hoon	South Korea	1:32.12	QA
2	Frédéric Blackburn	Canada	1:32.23	QA
3	Mark Lackie	Canada	1:32.30	QB
4	Geert Blanchart	Belgium	1:33.04	QB

=== Finals ===
The four qualifying skaters competed in Final A, while four others raced for 5th place in Final B.

Final A

Rank	Athlete	Country	Time	Notes
1st place, gold medalist(s)	Kim Ki-hoon	South Korea	1:30.76	
2nd place, silver medalist(s)	Frédéric Blackburn	Canada	1:31.11	
3rd place, bronze medalist(s)	Lee Joon-ho	South Korea	1:31.16	
4	Mike McMillen	New Zealand	1:31.32	

Final B

Rank	Athlete	Country	Time	Notes
5	Wilf O'Reilly	Great Britain	1:36.24	
6	Geert Blanchart	Belgium	1:36.28	
7	Mark Lackie	Canada	1:36.28	
8	Michel Daignault	Canada	1:37.10	
