= Short-track speed skating at the 1994 Winter Olympics – Men's 1000 metres =

Men's 1000 metres at the XVII Olympic Winter Games
- Pictogram for short track
- Venue: Hamar Olympic Amphitheatre
- Dates: 22 February 1994
- Competitors: 31 from 16 nations
- Winning time: 1:34.57

Medalists
1st place, gold medalist(s)		Kim Ki-hoon	South Korea
2nd place, silver medalist(s)		Chae Ji-hoon	South Korea
3rd place, bronze medalist(s)		Marc Gagnon	Canada

The men's 1000 metres in short track speed skating at the 1994 Winter Olympics took place on 22 February at the Hamar Olympic Amphitheatre.

== Results ==
=== Heats ===
The first round was held on 22 February. There were eight heats, with the top two finishers moving on to the quarterfinals.

Heat 1

Rank	Athlete	Country	Time	Notes
1	Marc Gagnon	Canada	1:32.52	Q
2	Kieran Hansen	Australia	1:32.96	Q
3	Mirko Vuillermin	Italy	1:33.51	
4	Batchuluuny Bat–Orgil	Mongolia	1:40.41	

Heat 2

Rank	Athlete	Country	Time	Notes
1	Andy Gabel	United States	1:32.32	Q
2	Richard Nizielski	Australia	1:32.42	Q
3	Martin Johansson	Sweden	1:32.50	
4	Mike McMillen	New Zealand	1:32.65	

Heat 3

Rank	Athlete	Country	Time	Notes
1	Satoru Terao	Japan	1:31.11	Q
2	Nicky Gooch	Great Britain	1:32.05	Q
3	John Coyle	United States	1:32.92	
4	Igor Ozerov	Russia	1:44.38	

Heat 4

Rank	Athlete	Country	Time	Notes
1	Kim Ki-hoon	South Korea	1:33.63	Q
2	Eric Flaim	United States	1:33.71	Q
3	Erik Duyvelshoff	Netherlands	1:34.37	

Heat 5

Rank	Athlete	Country	Time	Notes
1	Frédéric Blackburn	Canada	1:32.11	Q
2	Orazio Fagone	Italy	1:32.19	Q
3	Sergey Kobyzev	Russia	1:33.07	
4	Andrew Nicholson	New Zealand	1:34.18	

Heat 6

Rank	Athlete	Country	Time	Notes
1	Lee Joon-ho	South Korea	1:33.67	Q
2	Li Lianli	China	1:34.52	Q
3	Steven Bradbury	Australia	2:01.89	
–	Geert Blanchart	Belgium	DQ	

Heat 7

Rank	Athlete	Country	Time	Notes
1	Derrick Campbell	Canada	1:33.00	Q
2	Li Jiajun	China	1:33.14	Q
3	Wilf O'Reilly	Great Britain	1:33.57	
4	Bruno Loscos	France	1:33.93	

Heat 8

Rank	Athlete	Country	Time	Notes
1	Chae Ji-hoon	South Korea	1:32.11	Q
2	Bjørnar Elgetun	Norway	1:32.35	Q
3	Jun Uematsu	Japan	1:32.67	
4	Chris Nicholson	New Zealand	1:34.91	

=== Quarterfinals ===
The quarterfinals were held on 22 February. The top two finishers in each of the four quarterfinals advanced to the semifinals.

Quarterfinal 1

Rank	Athlete	Country	Time	Notes
1	Chae Ji-hoon	South Korea	1:31.40	Q
2	Derrick Campbell	Canada	1:31.82	Q
3	Kieran Hansen	Australia	1:32.34	
–	Orazio Fagone	Italy	DQ	

Quarterfinal 2

Rank	Athlete	Country	Time	Notes
1	Lee Joon-ho	South Korea	1:29.58	Q OR
2	Satoru Terao	Japan	1:29.64	Q
3	Eric Flaim	United States	1:29.70	
4	Richard Nizielski	Australia	1:29.93	

Quarterfinal 3

Rank	Athlete	Country	Time	Notes
1	Frédéric Blackburn	Canada	1:30.83	Q
2	Kim Ki-hoon	South Korea	1:30.89	Q
3	Bjørnar Elgetun	Norway	1:30.96	
4	Li Lianli	China	1:32.16	

Quarterfinal 4

Rank	Athlete	Country	Time	Notes
1	Marc Gagnon	Canada	1:31.93	Q
2	Nicky Gooch	Great Britain	1:32.00	Q
3	Andy Gabel	United States	1:33.59	
–	Li Jiajun	China	DQ	

=== Semifinals ===
The semifinals were held on 22 February. The top two finishers in each of the two semifinals qualified for the A final, while the third and fourth place skaters advanced to the B Final.

Semifinal 1

Rank	Athlete	Country	Time	Notes
1	Kim Ki-hoon	South Korea	1:31.69	QA
2	Nicky Gooch	Great Britain	1:31.77	QA
3	Lee Joon-ho	South Korea	1:31.93	QB
4	Marc Gagnon	Canada	2:16.27	QB

Semifinal 2

Rank	Athlete	Country	Time	Notes
1	Chae Ji-hoon	South Korea	1:31.56	QA
2	Derrick Campbell	Canada	1:36.12	QA
3	Frédéric Blackburn	Canada	1:41.71	QB
4	Satoru Terao	Japan	1:43.58	QB

=== Finals ===
The four qualifying skaters competed in Final A, while four others raced for 5th place in Final B. Having left the track early due to a lap counting error, Derrick Campbell failed to finish the final, not completing the sufficient number of laps, and Nicky Gooch was disqualified, so the winner of the B final, Marc Gagnon was awarded the bronze medal.

Final A

Rank	Athlete	Country	Time	Notes
1st place, gold medalist(s)	Kim Ki-hoon	South Korea	1:34.57	
2nd place, silver medalist(s)	Chae Ji-hoon	South Korea	1:34.92	
–	Nicky Gooch	Great Britain		DQ
–	Derrick Campbell	Canada		DNF

Final B

Rank	Athlete	Country	Time	Notes
3rd place, bronze medalist(s)	Marc Gagnon	Canada	1:33.03	
4	Satoru Terao	Japan	1:33.39	
5	Lee Joon-ho	South Korea	1:44.99	
–	Frédéric Blackburn	Canada		DQ
