= Short-track speed skating at the 1988 Winter Olympics =

1988 Olympic demonstration event

Short track speed skating was a demonstration sport at the 1988 Winter Olympic Games. Those competition events took place at the Max Bell Arena in Calgary. This was the only time in the history of Olympic Games that the short track venue was shared with curling.

== Medal table ==
Rank	Nation	Gold	Silver	Bronze	Total
1	Netherlands	2	2	1	5
2	Great Britain	2	0	0	2
2	South Korea	2	0	0	2
4	Canada	1	6	3	10
5	Italy	1	1	2	4
6	Japan	1	1	1	3
7	China	1	0	2	3
8	France	0	0	1	1
Totals (8 entries)		10	10	10	30

== Men's events ==
=== 500 m ===
==== Final A ====
February 23, 1988

Rank	Name	Country	Time
1	Wilfred O'Reilly	Great Britain	44.80
2	Mario Vincent	Canada	45.15
3	Tatsuyoshi Ishihara	Japan	45.37
4	Robert Dubreuil	Canada	45.38

==== Final B ====
Rank	Name	Country	Time
5	Michel Daignault	Canada	45.10
6	Orazio Fagone	Italy	46.35
7	Kim Ki-hoon	South Korea	48.82
8	Toshinobu Kawai	Japan	49.12

=== 1000 m ===
==== Final A ====
February 24, 1988

Rank	Name	Country	Time
1	Wilf O'Reilly	Great Britain	1:33.44
2	Michel Daignault	Canada	1:33.66
3	Marc Bella	France	1:34.45
4	Tatsuyoshi Ishihara	Japan	1:35.72
5	Louis Grenier	Canada	1:37.17
6	Roberto Peretti	Italy	1:48.33
7	Lee Joon-ho	South Korea	DQ

==== Final B ====
Rank	Name	Country	Time
8	Kim Ki-hoon	South Korea	1:37.20
9	Richard Suyten	Netherlands	1:37.52
10	Didier Claeys	Belgium	1:38.10
11	Orazio Fagone	Italy	1:38.35
12	Tsutomu Kawasaki	Japan	1:38.40

=== 1500 m ===
==== Final A ====
February 22, 1988

Rank	Name	Country	Time
1	Kim Ki-hoon	South Korea	2:26.68
2	Louis Grenier	Canada	2:26.99
3	Orazio Fagone	Italy	2:27.16
4	Roberto Peretti	Italy	2:27.24
5	Mario Vincent	Canada	2:27.34
6	Michel Daignault	Canada	2:28.15

==== Final B ====
Rank	Name	Country	Time
7	Lee Joon-ho	South Korea	2:38.19
8	Tatsuyoshi Ishihara	Japan	2:38.65
9	Yuichi Akasaka	Japan	2:38.88
10	Kawai Toshinobu	Japan	2:39.93
11	Tsutomu Kawasaki	Japan	2:43.67
12	Pat Moore	United States	2:51.21

=== 3000 m ===
==== Final ====
February 25, 1988

Rank	Name	Country	Time
1	Lee Joon-ho	South Korea	5:21.63
2	Charles Veldhoven	Netherlands	5:22.39
3	Michel Daignault	Canada	5:30.68
4	Peter van der Velde	Netherlands	5:31.07
5	Mario Vincent	Canada	5:31.15
6	Mo Ji-soo	South Korea	5:32.24
7	Tatsuyoshi Ishihara	Japan	5:32.70
8	Jaco Mos	Netherlands	5:36.16

=== 5000 m relay ===
==== Final ====
February 25, 1988

Rank	Country	Name	Time
1	Netherlands	Charles Veldhoven; Peter van der Velde; Jaco Mos; Richard Suyten	7:29.05
2	Italy	Roberto Peretti; Enrico Peretti; Orazio Fagone; Hugo Herrnhof	7:30.39
3	Canada	Louis Grenier; Robert Dubreuil; Mario Vincent; Michel Daignault	7:35.47
4	United States	Andy Gabel; Patrick Moore; Brian Arseneau; David Besteman	7:47.59
5	Japan	Yuichi Akasaka; Tochinobu Kawai; Tsutomu Kawasaki; Tatsuyoshi Ishihara	
6	Great Britain	Robert Blair; Wilf O'Reilly; Ian Ellis; Stuart Horsepool	

== Women's events ==
=== 500 m ===
==== Final A ====
February 22, 1988

Rank	Name	Country	Time
1	Monique Velzeboer	Netherlands	48.28
2	Eden Donatelli	Canada	48.34
3	Li Yan	China	48.84
4	Sylvie Daigle	Canada	49.64

==== Final B ====
Rank	Name	Country	Time
5	Yumiko Yamada	Japan	49.57
6	Cristina Sciolla	Italy	49.75
7	Simone Velzeboer	Netherlands	DNF
7	Eiko Shishii	Japan	DNF

=== 1000 m ===
==== Final A ====
February 25, 1988

Rank	Name	Country	Time
1	Li Yan	China	1:39.00
2	Sylvie Daigle	Canada	1:41.15
3	Monique Velzeboer	Netherlands	1:43.10
4	Jing Qiao	China	1:46.38
5	Maryse Perreault	Canada	2:25.50
6	Jinyan Li	China	DQ

==== Final B ====
Rank	Name	Country	Time
7	Eden Donatelli	Canada	1:40.06
8	Maria Rosa Candido	Italy	1:40.21
9	Nathalie Lambert	Canada	1:40.49
10	Viktoriya Troytskaya	Soviet Union	1:41.47
11	Valérie Barizza	France	1:43.12
12	Yumiko Yamada	Japan	DNF

=== 1500 m ===
==== Final A ====
February 23, 1988

Rank	Name	Country	Time
1	Sylvie Daigle	Canada	2:37.61
2	Monique Velzeboer	Netherlands	2:37.77
3	Li Yan	China	2:37.92
4	Eiko Shishii	Japan	2:38.19
5	Yumiko Yamada	Japan	2:39.49
6	Nathalie Lambert	Canada	2:44.77

==== Final B ====
Rank	Name	Country	Time
7	Maria Rosa Candido	Italy	2:43.64
8	Maryse Perreault	Canada	2:43.91
9	Jinyan Li	China	2:44.04
10	Yoo Boo-won	South Korea	2:44.28
11	Jing Qiao	China	2:48.89
AC	Lee Yoon-sook	South Korea	– DNF

=== 3000 m ===
February 24, 1988

Rank	Name	Country	Time
1	Eiko Shishii	Japan	5:25.44
2	Sylvie Daigle	Canada	5:25.82
3	Maria Rosa Candido	Italy	5:25.89
4	Hiromi Takeuchi	Japan	5:26.52
5	Li Yan	China	5:28.68
6	Nathalie Lambert	Canada	5:37.36
7	Nobuko Yamada	Japan	5:47.29
8	Maryse Perreault	Canada	5:51.97

=== 3000 m relay ===
February 24, 1988

Rank	Country	Name	Time
1	Italy	Maria Rosa Candido; Gabriella Monteduro; Barbara Mussio; Maria Cristina Sciolla	4:45.88
2	Japan	Hiromi Takeuchi; Eiko Shishii; Yumiko Yamada; Nobuko Yamada	4:46.91
3	Canada	Susan Auch; Nathalie Lambert; Eden Donatelli; Maryse Perreault	4:49.77
