= Australia at the 1994 Winter Olympics =

- IOC code: AUS
- NOC: Australian Olympic Committee
- Website: www.olympics.com.au

in Lillehammer
- Competitors: 25 (18 men, 7 women) in 9 sports
- Flag bearer: Kirstie Marshall
- Medals Ranked 22nd: Gold 0 Silver 0 Bronze 1 Total 1

Winter Olympics appearances (overview)
- 1936; 1948; 1952; 1956; 1960; 1964; 1968; 1972; 1976; 1980; 1984; 1988; 1992; 1994; 1998; 2002; 2006; 2010; 2014; 2018; 2022; 2026

Australia competed at the 1994 Winter Olympics in Lillehammer, Norway.

Australia won a bronze medal in the men's 5000 metres short track relay, the nation's first medal at the Winter Olympic Games. A total of 25 Australian athletes competed, participating in alpine skiing, biathlon, bobsleigh, cross-country skiing, figure skating, freestyle skiing (in both aerials and moguls), luge, short track speed skating, and speed skating.

== Medalists ==
Medal	Name	Sport	Event	Date
Bronze	Steven Bradbury; Kieran Hansen; Andrew Murtha; Richard Nizielski	Short track speed skating	Men's 5000 metre relay	26 February

== Competitors ==
The following is the list of number of competitors in the Games.

Sport	Men	Women	Total
Alpine skiing	1	1	2
Biathlon	0	2	2
Bobsleigh	4	–	4
Cross-country skiing	2	0	2
Figure skating	1	1	2
Freestyle skiing	3	2	5
Luge	1	0	1
Short track speed skating	4	1	5
Speed skating	2	0	2
Total	18	7	25

== Alpine skiing ==
Men

Athlete	Event	Run 1 (DH)		Run 2 (Sl)		Run 3 (Sl)		Final/Total		
Athlete	Event	Time	Rank	Time	Rank	Time	Rank	Time	Diff	Rank
Anthony Huguet	Super-G	—N/a						4:37.44	+4.91	37
Anthony Huguet	Giant slalom	1:33.60	37	did not finish		—N/a		did not finish		

Women

Athlete	Event	Run 1 (DH)		Run 2 (Sl)		Run 3 (Sl)		Final/Total		
Athlete	Event	Time	Rank	Time	Rank	Time	Rank	Time	Diff	Rank
Zali Steggall	Giant slalom	1:28.68	35	1:17.46	24	—N/a		2:46.14	+15.17	24
Zali Steggall	Slalom	1:03.16	28	59.88	22	—N/a		2:03.04	+7.03	22
Zali Steggall	Combined	1:33.46	31	52.34	12	did not finish				

== Biathlon ==
Women

Athlete	Event	Final		
Athlete	Event	Time	Misses	Rank
Sandra Paintin-Paul	Individual	1:01:21.7	7	64
Sandra Paintin-Paul	Sprint	28:31.1	1	40
Kerryn Rim	Individual	54:10.1	2	8
Kerryn Rim	Sprint	27:32.3	2	21

== Bobsleigh ==
Athlete	Event	Run 1		Run 2		Run 3		Run 4		Total	
Athlete	Event	Time	Rank	Time	Rank	Time	Rank	Time	Rank	Time	Rank
Justin McDonald; Glenn Carroll	Two-man	54.03	28	53.96	27	54.21	29	54.27	27	3:36.47	27
Justin McDonald; Glenn Carroll; Scott Walker; Adam Barclay	Four-man	52.48	16	52.67	21	52.85	20	53.02	20	3:31.02	20

== Cross-country skiing ==
Men

Athlete	Event	Race	
Athlete	Event	Time	Rank
Anthony Evans	10 km classical	27:09.9	51
Anthony Evans	15 km freestyle pursuit	1:08:22.9	57
Anthony Evans	50 km classical	2:22:05.2	43
Mark Gray	10 km classical	27:54.0	67
Mark Gray	15 km freestyle pursuit	1:10:01.1	66
Mark Gray	30 km freestyle	1:24:49.9	61
Mark Gray	50 km classical	2:28:51.6	59

== Figure skating ==
Athlete(s)	Event	CD1	CD2	SP/OD	FS/FD	Total	
Athlete(s)	Event	FP	FP	FP	FP	TFP	Rank
Stephen Carr	Men's	—N/a		20 Q	18	28.0	18
Danielle Carr & Stephen Carr	Pairs	—N/a		10	11	16.0	11

== Freestyle skiing ==
Men

Athlete	Event	Qualifying		Final	
Athlete	Event	Points	Rank	Points	Rank
Nick Cleaver	Moguls	24.34	15 Q	23.02	16
Adrian Costa	Moguls	25.46	7 Q	23.38	14
Paul Costa	Moguls	22.20	26	did not advance	

Women

Athlete	Event	Qualifying		Final	
Athlete	Event	Points	Rank	Points	Rank
Jacqui Cooper	Aerials	139.67	16	did not advance	
Kirstie Marshall	Aerials	166.12	q Q	150.76	6

== Luge ==
Athlete(s)	Event	Run 1	Run 2	Run 3	Run 4	Total	
Athlete(s)	Event	Time	Time	Time	Time	Time	Rank
Roger White	Men's	55.674	54.546	54.842	58.000	3:43.062	32

== Short track speed skating ==
The relay result was Australia's first Winter Olympics medal. In the semi-final, they beat Japan and New Zealand to qualify behind Canada. They went into the final with three objectives: to stay on their feet (to avoid a repeat of what happened in Albertville), to remain undisqualified, and to beat at least one of the other three finalists. With 21 of 45 laps to go, a Canadian crashed into the side, and was out of contention. With 12 laps to go, Italian Mirko Vuillermin accelerated away, creating a gap such that Australia was unlikely to win gold. Until the last change, it seemed that Australia might win silver. Nizielski was the final skater, and said later that "At the last change [American] Eric Flaim got a good push-away and he stepped underneath my feet and stopped me. I thought, well I'm not going to fight him for this. I didn't want to let the team down. And I was very aware that I had taken a fall in Albertville. I just wanted to get through and get the medal." Team member Steven Bradbury went on to win Australia's first winter gold in 2002.

Men

Athlete	Event	Heat		Quarterfinal		Semifinal		Final	
Athlete	Event	Time	Rank	Time	Rank	Time	Rank	Time	Rank
Steven Bradbury	500m	45.43	2 Q	44.18	1 Q	1:03.51	4 QB	B Final; 45.33	8
Steven Bradbury	1000m	2:01.89	3	did not advance					24
Kieran Hansen	500m	46.30	3	did not advance					23
Kieran Hansen	1000m	1:32.96	2 Q	1:32.34	3	did not advance			12
Richard Nizielski	500m	44.86 OR	1 Q	45.57	4	did not advance			10
Richard Nizielski	1000m	1:32.42	2 Q	1:29.93	4	did not advance			13
Steven Bradbury; Kieran Hansen; Andrew Murtha; Richard Nizielski	5000m relay	—N/a				7:14.41	2 Q	7:13.68	3rd place, bronze medalist(s)

Women

Athlete	Event	Heat		Quarterfinal		Semifinal		Final	
Athlete	Event	Time	Rank	Time	Rank	Time	Rank	Time	Rank
Karen Kah	500m	48.56	2 Q	47.90	3	did not advance			12
Karen Kah	1000m	1:41.64	1 Q	1:39.93	4	did not advance			11

== Speed skating ==
Men

Athlete	Event	Final	
Athlete	Event	Time	Rank
Phillip Tahmindjis	1000 m	1:16.29	37
Phillip Tahmindjis	1500 m	1:57.59	36
Danny Kah	1500 m	1:56.04	25
Danny Kah	5000 m	7:00.02	25
