= Italy national short track team =

National sports team

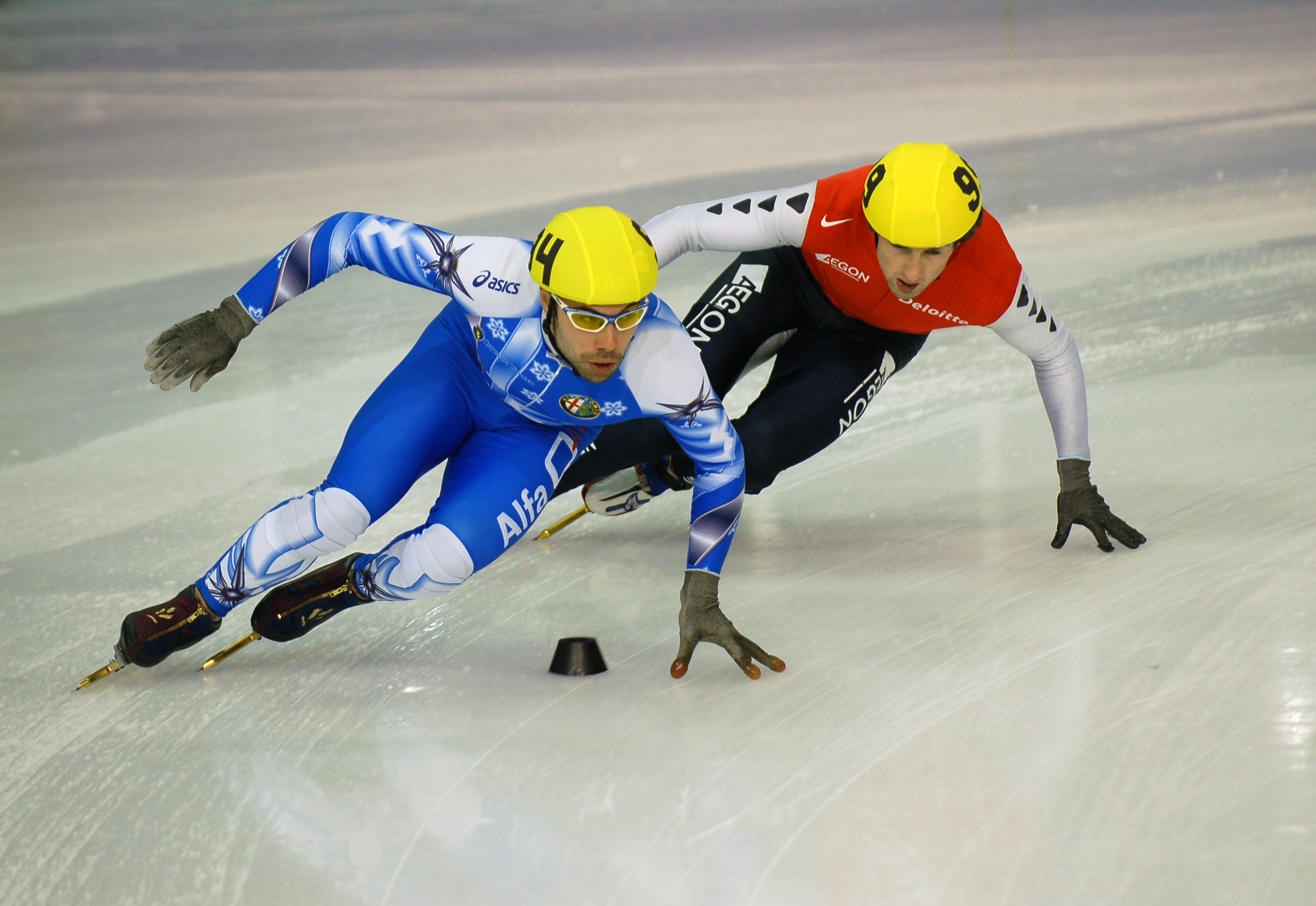
Fabio Carta in a race in 2007

The Italy national short track team represents Italy in International short track competitions such as Olympic Games or World Short Track Speed Skating Championships and World Short Track Speed Skating Team Championships.

== Olympic Games ==
Edition	Event	Team	Medal
(Norway) 1994 Lillehammer	5000 metres relay	Maurizio Carnino, Diego Cattani, Orazio Fagone, Hugo Herrnhof, Mirko Vuillermin	1st
(United States) 2002 Salt Lake City	5000 metres relay	Maurizio Carnino, Fabio Carta, Nicola Franceschina, Nicola Rodigari, Michele Antonioli	2nd
(Italy) 2006 Turin	3000 metres relay	Marta Capurso, Arianna Fontana, Katia Zini, Mara Zini	3rd
(Russia) 2014 Sochi	3000 metres relay	Arianna Fontana, Lucia Peretti, Martina Valcepina, Elena Viviani	3rd
(Italy) 2026 Milano-Cortina	Mixed 2000 metres relay	Elisa Confortola, Chiara Betti, Arianna Fontana, Thomas Nadalini, Pietro Sighel, Luca Spechenhauser	1st

== World Team Championships ==
Edition	Event	Team	Medal
(Japan) 1992 Nagano	Overall	Orazio Fagone, Mirko Vuillermin, Hugo Herrnhof, Diego Cattani	2nd
(Hungary) 1993 Budapest	Overall	Hugo Herrnhof, Orazio Fagone, Mirko Vuillermin, Roberto Peretti, Diego Cattani	1st
(Canada) 1994 Cambridge	Overall	Orazio Fagone, Mirko Vuillermin, Hugo Herrnhof, Diego Cattani, Maurizio Carnino	3rd
(United States) 1996 Lake Placid	Overall	Michele Antonioli, Orazio Fagone, Mirko Vuillermin, Nicola Franceschina, Fabio Carta	3rd
(South Korea) 1997 Seoul	Overall	Michele Antonioli, Orazio Fagone, Mirko Vuillermin, Nicola Franceschina, Maurizio Carnino	3rd
(Italy) 1998 Bormio	Overall	Fabio Carta, Michele Antonioli, Nicola Franceschina, Maurizio Carnino, Nicola Rodigari	3rd
(Netherlands) 2000 The Hague	Overall	Fabio Carta, Michele Antonioli, Nicola Franceschina, Maurizio Carnino, Nicola Rodigari	3rd
(Hungary) 2007 Budapest	Overall	Marco Bertoldi, Fabio Carta, Yuri Confortola, Nicola Rodigari, Roberto Serra	3rd

== World Championships ==
Edition	Event	Team	Medal
(Canada) 1987 Montreal	5000 metres relay	Orazio Fagone, Luca Bolognesi, Roberto Peretti, Enrico Peretti, Hugo Herrnhof	2nd
(United States) 1988 St. Louis	5000 metres relay	Orazio Fagone, Roberto Peretti, Enrico Peretti, Hugo Herrnhof, Michele Rubino	1st
(United States) 1993 Beijing	5000 metres relay	Orazio Fagone, Mirko Vuillermin, Roberto Peretti, Hugo Herrnhof	2nd
(Norway) 1995 Gjøvik	5000 metres relay	Orazio Fagone, Mirko Vuillermin, Maurizio Carnino, Diego Cattani	2nd
(Netherlands) 1996 The Hague	5000 metres relay	Michele Antonioli, Orazio Fagone, Maurizio Carnino, Mirko Vuillermin	1st
(Japan) 1997 Nagano	5000 metres relay	Orazio Fagone, Mirko Vuillermin, Fabio Carta, Michele Antonioli, Nicola Franceschina	3rd
(United Kingdom) 2000 Sheffield	5000 metres relay	Nicola Rodigari, Fabio Carta, Michele Antonioli, Nicola Franceschina	3rd
(Sweden) 2004 Gothenburg	5000 metres relay	Roberto Serra, Michele Antonioli, Nicola Franceschina, Nicola Rodigari, Fabio Carta	3rd

=== Medallists ===
Athlete	Class	Olympics				Team WC				WC				Total			
Athlete	Class	1st place, gold medalist(s)	2nd place, silver medalist(s)	3rd place, bronze medalist(s)	Tot.	1st place, gold medalist(s)	2nd place, silver medalist(s)	3rd place, bronze medalist(s)	Tot.	1st place, gold medalist(s)	2nd place, silver medalist(s)	3rd place, bronze medalist(s)	Tot.	1st place, gold medalist(s)	2nd place, silver medalist(s)	3rd place, bronze medalist(s)	Tot.
Orazio Fagone	1968	1	0	0	1	1	1	3	5	2	3	1	6	4	4	4	12
Mirko Vuillermin	1973	1	0	0	1	1	1	3	5	1	2	1	4	3	3	4	10
Hugo Herrnhof	1964	1	0	0	1	1	1	1	3	1	2	0	3	3	3	1	7
Maurizio Carnino	1975	1	1	0	2	0	0	4	4	1	1	0	1	2	2	4	8
Diego Cattani	1971	1	0	0	1	1	1	1	3	0	1	0	1	2	2	1	5
Roberto Peretti	1966	0	0	0	0	1	0	0	1	1	2	0	3	2	2	0	4
Michele Antonioli	1977	0	1	0	1	0	0	4	4	1	0	3	4	1	1	7	9
Enricoo Peretti	-	0	0	0	0	0	0	0	0	1	1	0	2	1	1	0	2
Michele Rubino	-	0	0	0	0	0	0	0	0	1	0	0	1	1	0	0	1
Fabio Carta	1977	0	1	0	1	0	0	4	4	0	0	3	3	0	1	7	8
Nicola Franceschina	1977	0	1	0	1	0	0	4	4	0	0	3	3	0	1	7	8
Nicola Rodigari	1981	0	1	0	1	0	0	3	3	0	0	2	2	0	1	5	6
Marco Bertoldi	-	0	0	0	0	0	0	0	3	0	1	0	1	0	1	0	1
Roberto Serra	1982	0	0	0	0	0	0	1	1	0	0	1	1	0	0	2	2
Luca Bolognesi	-	0	0	0	0	0	0	1	1	0	0	0	0	0	0	1	1

== See also ==
- Short track speed skating at the Winter Olympics
