= Australia at the 1992 Winter Olympics =

- IOC code: AUS
- NOC: Australian Olympic Committee
- Website: www.olympics.com.au

in Albertville
- Competitors: 23 in 9 sports
- Flag bearer: Danny Kah
- Medals: Gold 0 Silver 0 Bronze 0 Total 0

Winter Olympics appearances (overview)
- 1936; 1948; 1952; 1956; 1960; 1964; 1968; 1972; 1976; 1980; 1984; 1988; 1992; 1994; 1998; 2002; 2006; 2010; 2014; 2018; 2022; 2026

Australia competed at the 1992 Winter Olympics in Albertville, France. 23 athletes competed, participating in alpine skiing, biathlon, bobsleigh, cross-country skiing, figure skating, freestyle skiing, luge, short track speed skating, and speed skating. Freestyle skiing and short-track speed skating were medal events for the first time, and Australia has competed in these events in every games since. Australia's best result at these games was seventh in the 5000 metres short-track relay.

== Competitors ==
The following is the list of number of competitors in the Games.

Sport	Men	Women	Total
Alpine skiing	1	1	2
Biathlon	0	2	2
Bobsleigh	2	–	2
Cross-country skiing	2	0	2
Figure skating	2	1	3
Freestyle skiing	2	0	2
Luge	0	1	1
Short track speed skating	4	2	6
Speed skating	2	0	2
Total	15	7	22

== Alpine skiing ==
Men

Athlete	Event	Run 1		Run 2		Final/Total		
Athlete	Event	Time	Rank	Time	Rank	Time	Diff	Rank
Steven Lee	Downhill	—N/a				1:58.55	+8.18	36
Steven Lee	Super-G	—N/a				1:16.58	+3.54	30

Men's combined

Athlete	Event	Downhill			Slalom					Total	
Athlete	Event	Time	Points	Rank	Time 1	Time 2	Total	Points	Rank	Points	Rank
Steven Lee	Combined	1:46.64	17.02	14	55.76	57.34	1:53.10	68.03	22	85.05	19

Women

Athlete	Event	Run 1		Run 2		Final/Total		
Athlete	Event	Time	Rank	Time	Rank	Time	Diff	Rank
Zali Steggall	Giant slalom	1:10.54	30	1:11.66	49	2:22.20	+9.46	23
Zali Steggall	Slalom	did not finish						

Women's combined

Athlete	Event	Downhill			Slalom					Total	
Athlete	Event	Time	Points	Rank	Time 1	Time 2	Total	Points	Rank	Points	Rank
Zali Steggall	Combined	1:31.30	68.06	29	did not finish						

== Biathlon ==
Women

Athlete	Event	Final		
Athlete	Event	Time	Misses	Rank
Sandra Paintin	Individual	58:55.3	3	40
Sandra Paintin	Sprint	28:50.0	2	54
Kerryn Pethybridge	Individual	57:49.7	2	32
Kerryn Pethybridge	Sprint	27:58.7	2	39

== Bobsleigh ==
Paul Narracott was the first person to have represented Australia at both the Summer and Winter Olympic Games, having competed in the 100 metres at the 1984 Summer Olympics.

Athlete	Event	Run 1		Run 2		Run 3		Run 4		Total	
Athlete	Event	Time	Rank	Time	Rank	Time	Rank	Time	Rank	Time	Rank
Paul Narracott; Glenn Turner	Two-man	62.17	28	62.61	31	62.81	31	62.66	29	4:10.25	30

== Cross-country skiing ==
Men

Athlete	Event	Race	
Athlete	Event	Time	Rank
Anthony Evans	10 km classical	30:54.2	37
Anthony Evans	15 km freestyle pursuit	43:29.2	39
Anthony Evans	30 km classical	1:32:29.9	54
Anthony Evans	50 km freestyle	2:15:46.9	34
Paul Gray	10 km classical	33:12.2	73
Paul Gray	15 km freestyle pursuit	47:08.9	65
Paul Gray	50 km freestyle	2:25:29.0	55

== Curling ==
Curling was a demonstration sport at the 1992 Winter Olympics.

Australia
Melbourne CC, Melbourne

Skip: Hugh Millikin
Third: Thomas Kidd
Second: Daniel Joyce
Lead: Stephen Hewitt
Alternate: Brian Stuart

== Figure skating ==
Athlete(s)	Event	CD1	CD2	SP/OD	FS/FD	Total	
Athlete(s)	Event	FP	FP	FP	FP	TFP	Rank
Cameron Medhurst	Men's	—N/a		16 Q	16	24.0	16
Stephen Carr & Danielle Carr	Pairs	—N/a		13	13	19.5	13

== Freestyle skiing ==
This was the first time freestyle skiing was a medal event at the Winter Olympics, and Australia has competed in it in every Winter Olympics since. Aerials was a demonstration sport at these Olympics, which Kirstie Marshall participated in.

Men

Athlete	Event	Qualifying		Final	
Athlete	Event	Points	Rank	Points	Rank
Nick Cleaver	Moguls	23.25	9 Q	22.04	11
Adrian Costa	Moguls	22.39	15 Q	21.18	14

== Luge ==
Athlete(s)	Event	Run 1	Run 2	Run 3	Run 4	Total	
Athlete(s)	Event	Time	Time	Time	Time	Time	Rank
Diane Ogle	Women's	47.573	47.682	47.680	47.530	3:10.465	21

== Short track speed skating ==
This was the first time short track was a medal event at the Winter Olympics. Australia has competed in it in every games since, winning Australia's first ever medal and Australia's first gold medal. However, at these games, the unpredictable nature of short track acted against Australia, when a fall in the semi-finals denied the team a chance at the medals.

Men

Athlete	Event	Heat		Quarterfinal		Semifinal		Final	
Athlete	Event	Time	Rank	Time	Rank	Time	Rank	Time	Rank
Andrew Murtha	1000m	1:34.71	3	did not advance					19
Richard Nizielski	1000m	1:32.42	2 Q	1:29.93	4	did not advance			13
Kieran Hansen; John Kah; Andrew Murtha; Richard Nizielski	5000m relay	—N/a		7:15.10	2 Q	7:32.57	4 Q	Final B 7:32.57	7

Women

Athlete	Event	Heat		Quarterfinal		Semifinal		Final	
Athlete	Event	Time	Rank	Time	Rank	Time	Rank	Time	Rank
Felicity Campbell	500m	50.11	3	did not advance					20
Karen Gardiner	500m	Disqualified							

== Speed skating ==
Men

Athlete	Event	Final	
Athlete	Event	Time	Rank
Danny Kah	1000 m	1:17.96	34
Danny Kah	1500 m	1:59.33	23
Danny Kah	5000 m	7:22.86	20
Danny Kah	10000 m	14:42.32	12
Phillip Tahmindjis	1000 m	1:18.77	38
Phillip Tahmindjis	1500 m	2:02.08	38
Phillip Tahmindjis	5000 m	7:26.56	25
Phillip Tahmindjis	10000 m	Disqualified	

== See also ==
- Australia at the Winter Olympics
