= Daignault =

Daignault is a surname. Notable people with the surname include:

- Cynthia Daignault (born 1978), American painter
- Eugène Daignault (1895–1960), American-Canadian radio actor
- Guy Daignault (died 2005), Canadian speed skater
- Laurent Daignault (born 1968), Canadian speed skater
- Michel Daignault (born 1966), Canadian speed skater
