= Mo Ji-soo =

Short track speed skater

Personal information
- Born: June 3, 1969 (age 57) South Korea

Sport
- Country: South Korea
- Sport: Short track speed skating
- Retired: 1993
Medal record
Men's short track speed skating
Representing South Korea
Olympic Games
Gold medal – first place	1992 Albertville	5000 m relay
World Championships
Silver medal – second place	1992 Denver	Overall
Silver medal – second place	1992 Denver	1500 m
Silver medal – second place	1992 Denver	3000 m
Bronze medal – third place	1988 St. Louis	5000 m relay
Bronze medal – third place	1989 Solihull	5000 m relay
World Team Championships
Gold medal – first place	1992 Minamimaki	Team
Silver medal – second place	1991 Seoul	Team
Winter Universiade
Gold medal – first place	1989 Sofia	5000 m relay
Silver medal – second place	1989 Sofia	1500 m
Bronze medal – third place	1991 Sapporo	3000 m
Bronze medal – third place	1989 Sofia	3000 m
Asian Winter Games
Gold medal – first place	1990 Sapporo	5000 m relay

Mo Ji-soo (Korean: 모지수; born 3 June 1969) is a South Korean short track speed skater, who won a gold medal in the 5000 m relay at the 1992 Winter Olympics together with teammates Kim Ki-hoon, Lee Joon-ho, and Song Jae-kun.
