= Choi Yong-koo =

South Korean short track speed skater

Personal information
- Full name: Choi Yong-koo
- Nationality: South Korea

Sport
- Sport: Short track speed skating

Choi Yong-Koo is a South Korean short track speed skater. He won a silver medal in the 1991 World Short Track Speed Skating

Team Championships.

== International wins ==
World Team Championships
Year	Place	Medal	Category
1991	Seoul	Silver	Teams
