= Horsepool =

Horsepool may refer to:

== Places in the United Kingdom ==
- Horsepool, a lost settlement in Nottinghamshire, England
- Horsepool Farmhouse, Chevington, Suffolk
- Horsepools, a place in Gloucestershire, England

== People ==
- Mandy Horsepool (born 1959), a British speed skater
- Stuart Horsepool, a British speed skater at the 1988 and 1992 Olympics

== Other uses ==
- Beryl Horsepool-Worthingham, a character in The Ear, the Eye and the Arm
