= Andrew Nicholson =

Andrew or Andy Nicholson may refer to:

== Sports ==
- Andrew Nicholson (basketball) (born 1989), Canadian basketball player
- Andrew Nicholson (equestrian) (born 1961), New Zealand Olympic equestrian
- Andrew Nicholson (speed skater) (born 1970), New Zealand Olympic speed skater

== Others ==
- Andrew J. Nicholson, American Indologist (redirect)
- Andy Nicholson (active from 2002), English musician, formerly with the Arctic Monkeys
- Andy Nicholson (production designer) (active from 1993), American
