= 1995 World Short Track Speed Skating Team Championships =

Short track team championship

- Location: Zoetermeer, Netherlands
- Start date: 24 March 1995
- End date: 26 March 1995

The 1995 World Short Track Speed Skating Team Championships was the 5th edition of the World Short Track Speed Skating Team Championships which took place on 24–26 March 1995 in Zoetermeer, Netherlands.

== Medal winners ==
Event	Gold	Silver	Bronze
Men	Canada; Frédéric Blackburn; Derrick Campbell; Sylvain Gagnon; Marc Gagnon; Bryce Holbech	South Korea; Lee Joon-ho; Chae Ji-hoon; Park Sae-woo; Song Jae-kun; Lee Song-uk	United States; John Coyle; Andrew Gabel; Eric Flaim; J. P. Shilling; Charles King
Women	South Korea; Won Hye-kyung; Chun Lee-kyung; An Sang-mi; Kim Yun-mi; Kim Soo-hee	China; Wang Chunlu; Yang Yang (A); Zhang Yanmei; Yang Yang (S); Zhang Dongxiang	Canada; Chantale Sévig; Isabelle Charest; Christine Boudrias; Tania Vicent; Annie Perreault
