= 1991 World Short Track Speed Skating Team Championships =

Short track team championship

- Location: Seoul, South Korea
- Start date: 30-31 March 1991
- Competitors: 88 from 10 nations

The 1991 World Short Track Speed Skating Team Championships was the inaugural edition of the World Short Track Speed Skating Team Championships which took place on 30-31 March 1991 in Seoul, South Korea.

== Medal winners ==
Event	Gold	Silver	Bronze
Men	Japan; Toshinobu Kawai; Tatsuyoshi Ishihara; Tsutomu Kawasaki; Yuichi Akasaka; Shuji Kawai	South Korea; Mo Ji-soo; Lee Joon-ho; Song Jae-kun; Kim Ki-hoon; Choi Young-g	Canada; Frédéric Blackburn; Derrick Campbell; Laurent Daignault; Mark Lackie; Shawn Holman
Women	Canada; Sylvie Daigle; Nathalie Lambert; Eden Donatelli; Annie Perreault; Angela Cutrone	China; Li Yan; Zheng Chunyang; Wang Xiulan; Zhang Yanmei; Guo Hongru	Netherlands; Monique Velzeboer; Simone Velzeboer; Claudia Wolvers; Penèlope di Lella; Priscilla Ernst

== Results ==
=== Men ===
Rank	Nation	Total
1st place, gold medalist(s)	Japan	64
2nd place, silver medalist(s)	South Korea	63
3rd place, bronze medalist(s)	Canada	57
4	Italy	56
5	Australia	41
6	Netherlands	40
7	New Zealand	37
7	Soviet Union	37
9	Belgium	31

=== Women ===
Rank	Nation	Total
1st place, gold medalist(s)	Canada	79
2nd place, silver medalist(s)	China	65
3rd place, bronze medalist(s)	Netherlands	57
4	Soviet Union	52
5	South Korea	46
6	Japan	44
7	Italy	37
8	Australia	28
9	Belgium	25
