= Hugo Herrnhof =

Italian short track speed skater

Medal record

Men's short track speed skating

Representing Italy

Olympic Games
Gold medal – first place	1994 Lillehammer	5000 m relay

World Championships
Gold medal – first place	1988 St. Louis	5000 m relay
Silver medal – second place	1987 Montreal	5000 m relay
Silver medal – second place	1990 Amsterdam	500 m
Bronze medal – third place	1990 Amsterdam	3000 m
Bronze medal – third place	1991 Sydney	1500 m
Silver medal – second place	1993 Beijing	5000 m relay

World Team Championships
Gold medal – first place	1993 Budapest	Team
Silver medal – second place	1992 Minamimaki	Team
Bronze medal – third place	1994 Cambridge	Team

European Championships
Bronze medal – third place	1997 Malmö	5000 m relay

Hugo Herrnhof (born 21 September 1964 in Bolzano) is an Italian retired short track speed skater who competed in the 1988 Winter Olympics, 1992 Winter Olympics and 1994 Winter Olympics.

== Career ==
Herrnhof competed in the short track speed skating events at the 1988 Winter Olympics when this sport was a demonstration sport. He was a member of the Italian relay team which finished second in the 5000 metre relay.

Though he never reached the top individually in major international competitions, he finished second in 500 m and third in 3000 m and fourth in the overall standings at the 1990 World Short Track Speed Skating Championships. One year later he earns a bronze medal over 1500 m and finishing 7th in the overall classification at the World Short Track Speed Skating Championships 1991 in Sydney Australia. Two years later Herrnhof finished eighth with the Italian team in the 5000 metre relay at the 1992 Winter Olympics. In the 1000 metres he finished 12th.

At the 1994 Winter Olympics Herrnhof won the gold medal in the 5000 metre relay as a member of the Italian team alongside Maurizio Carnino, Orazio Fagone and Mirko Vuillermin.

== Post-career ==
After his skating career, Herrnhof became an administrator. From 2002 to 2006 he was working as Sports Manager for Speed Skating and Short Track at the Organizing committee of the 2006 Torino Olympic Winter Games. In September 2006, Hernnhof became Speed Skating Sports Director for the International Skating Union, having served for several years as a board member in the Italian Ice Sports Federation. Originate from Brunico, Herrnhof today is living in Piemonte and is married to a former short track speed skater, Cristina Sciolla, who participated in the 1988 and 1992 Winter Olympics.
