= Franky Vanhooren =

Belgian speed skater

Personal information
- Nationality: Belgian
- Born: 27 October 1963 (age 61); Bruges, Belgium

Sport
- Sport: Short track speed skating

Franky Vanhooren (born 27 October 1963) is a Belgian short track speed skater. He competed in the men's 5000 metre relay event at the 1992 Winter Olympics.
