= Diego Cattani =

Italian speed skater

Personal information
- Nationality: Italian
- Born: 9 September 1971 (age 54) Milan, Italy

Sport
- Sport: Short track speed skating
Medal record
Men's short track speed skating
Representing Italy
World Team Championships
Gold medal – first place	1993 Budapest	Team
Silver medal – second place	1992 Minamimaki	Team
Bronze medal – third place	1994 Cambridge	Team

Diego Cattani (born 9 September 1971) is an Italian short track speed skater. He competed in the men's 5000 metre relay event at the 1998 Winter Olympics.
