= Tibor Kun Bálint =

Hungarian speed skater

Personal information
- Nationality: Hungarian
- Born: 12 June 1972 (age 52); Budapest, Hungary

Sport
- Sport: Short track speed skating

Tibor Kun Bálint (born 12 June 1972) is a Hungarian short track speed skater. He competed in the men's 1000 metres event at the 1992 Winter Olympics.
