= Tsutomu Kawasaki =

Japanese short track speed skater

Medal record

Men's short track speed skating

Representing Japan

Olympic Games
Bronze medal – third place	1992 Albertville	5000 m relay

World Championships
Gold medal – first place	1990 Amsterdam	1000 m
Gold medal – first place	1992 Denver	5000m Relay
Silver medal – second place	1991 Sydney	1500 m

World Team Championships
Gold medal – first place	1991 Seoul	Team
Bronze medal – third place	1992 Minamimaki	Team

Tsutomu Kawasaki (川崎 努, Kawasaki Tsutomu; born 13 June 1969) is a Japanese short track speed skater, who won a bronze medal in the 5000 m relay at the 1992 Winter Olympics together with teammates Yuichi Akasaka, Tatsuyoshi Ishihara and Toshinobu Kawai. Kawasaki was also the flag bearer for the Japanese team at the game.
