= Maria Rosa Candido =

Italian speed skater

Personal information
- Nationality: Italian
- Born: 10 February 1967; Auronzo di Cadore, Italy
- Died: 18 October 1993 (aged 26); Silandro, Italy

Sport
- Sport: Short track speed skating

Maria Rosa Candido (10 February 1967 – 18 October 1993) was an Italian short track speed skater. She won the gold medal at the women's 3000 metre relay event at the 1988 Winter Olympics and bronze medal in individual 3000 metre relay. She competed in the women's 3000 metre relay event at the 1992 Winter Olympics.
