= Sergey Kobyzev =

Russian speed skater

Personal information
- Nationality: Russian
- Born: 3 June 1973 (age 51); Omsk, Russia

Sport
- Sport: Short track speed skating

Sergey Kobyzev (born 3 June 1973) is a Russian short track speed skater. He competed in two events at the 1994 Winter Olympics.
