= Geert Dejonghe =

Belgian speed skater

Personal information
- Nationality: Belgian
- Born: 21 October 1965 (age 59); Ghent, Belgium

Sport
- Sport: Short track speed skating

Geert Dejonghe (born 21 October 1965) is a Belgian short track speed skater. He competed in the men's 5000 metre relay event at the 1992 Winter Olympics.
