= Ann Zhang =

Chinese speed skater

Ann Zhang (Chinese: 張元元; born 21 June 1957) is a retired Chinese short track speed skating athlete and coach, who worked as the coach of the Australian short track team from 1996 to 2014.

== Early life ==
Zhang Yuanyuan was born on 21 June 1957. She hails from Heilongjiang. According to her Facebook profile, she studied at Harbin Sport University from 1981 to 1985. In 1988 she immigrated to Australia. Initially she took other jobs while she was teaching skating in sports clubs.

== Coaching career ==
Zhang, living in Brisbane, Australia, began her coaching career as the junior coach of the New South Wales selection in 1992. Four years later she was promoted to become the Australia national coach. At that time, the country's short track team had already achieved considerable success, including the first medal for Australia at the Winter Olympics, a bronze medal in the relay at the Games in Lillehammer in 1994. After Zhang took over the team, an Australian short tracker was able to finish fourth in the Short Track World Cup in 1996. Zhang achieved her greatest successes as a coach at the Olympic Games. The short track team was successful in the 2002 Games in Salt Lake City. Steven Bradbury surprisingly won the first Winter Olympics gold medal for his country.

On 15 April 2014, Zhang stepped down as the Australian head coach and retired.

In 2019, Zhang briefly worked as an interim coach for the Singaporean national team.
