= John Kah =

Australian short track speed skater

John Kah (born 22 July 1968) is an Australian former short track speed skater, who represented Australia at the 1992 Winter Olympics in the relay team.

== Career ==
In 1991, Kah was part of the Australian quartet that won the 5,000m relay at the World Championships in 1991 in Sydney. It was the first time that Australia had won a World Championship in a winter sport.

Australia's short track relay team went into the 1992 Olympics as world champion, but crashed in the semi-finals. The Australians were in third place when Richard Nizielski lost his footing and fell. They finished fourth, more than 10 seconds off the pace and failed to reach the final.

In 1994, Australia's short track relay team won Australia's first Winter Olympic medal, a bronze. The team scraped into the four-team final after edging out Japan and New Zealand to finish second in their semi-final. It adopted a plan of them staying on their feet as first priority, remaining undisqualified and beating at least one of the other three finalists. During the race, the Canadians fell and lost significant time, meaning that Australia would win its first medal if they raced conservatively and avoided a crash. Late in the race, Nizielski was fighting with his American counterpart for track position for the silver medal, but took the safe option and yielded, mindful of the lost opportunity following the crash in Albertville. Unlike Nizielski, Kah was not given an opportunity for redemption. He was named in the squad but remained on the bench and was not used in any of the races, and was not awarded a medal. His brother Danny Kah was also an Olympic speed skater for Australia, although he competed in the long track format at the 1988 Winter Olympics in Calgary.

== Personal life ==
Kah's parents were born in the Netherlands. He is married to fellow Australian speed skater Karen Gardiner-Kah. Their daughter Jamie Melham is a leading jockey.
