= Rémi Ingres =

French speed skater (born 1969)

Personal information
- Nationality: French
- Born: 30 July 1969 (age 55); Paris, France

Sport
- Sport: Short track speed skating

Rémi Ingres (born 30 July 1969) is a French short track speed skater. He competed in the men's 5000 metre relay event at the 1992 Winter Olympics.
