= Dmitry Yershov =

Russian speed skater

Personal information
- Nationality: Russian
- Born: 15 January 1971 (age 54); Nizhny Novgorod, Russia

Sport
- Sport: Short track speed skating

Dmitry Yershov (born 15 January 1971) is a Russian short track speed skater. He competed in the men's 1000 metres event at the 1992 Winter Olympics.
