= Arnaud Drouet =

French speed skater (born 1973)

Personal information
- Nationality: French
- Born: 6 June 1973 (age 51); Ermont, France

Sport
- Sport: Short track speed skating

Arnaud Drouet (born 6 June 1973) is a French short track speed skater. He competed in the men's 5000 metre relay event at the 1992 Winter Olympics.
