= Short-track speed skating at the 1994 Winter Olympics =

Short Track Speed Skating at the XVII Olympic Winter Games
- Venue: Hamar Olympic Amphitheatre
- Dates: 22–26 February
- Competitors: 87 from 19 nations

Short track speed skating at the 1994 Winter Olympics was held from 22 to 26 February. Six events were contested at the Hamar Olympic Amphitheatre. In short track speed skating's second Olympic appearance, two events were added, the 500 metres for the men and the 1000 metres for the women.

== Medal summary ==
=== Medal table ===
Rank	Nation	Gold	Silver	Bronze	Total
1	South Korea	4	1	1	6
2	United States	1	1	2	4
3	Italy	1	1	0	2
4	Canada	0	2	1	3
5	China	0	1	0	1
6	Australia	0	0	1	1
6	Great Britain	0	0	1	1
Totals (7 entries)		6	6	6	18

South Korea led the medal table with six, including four golds. The medal for the Australian men's relay team was the country's first in the Winter Olympics. Chun Lee-kyung led the individual medal table, with two gold medals. The top men's medalists were Chae Ji-hoon and Mirko Vuillermin, who won one gold and one silver.

=== Men's events ===
Event	Gold		Silver		Bronze	
500 metres	Chae Ji-hoon; South Korea	43.45	Mirko Vuillermin; Italy	43.47	Nicky Gooch; Great Britain	43.68
1000 metres	Kim Ki-hoon; South Korea	1:34.57	Chae Ji-hoon; South Korea	1:34.92	Marc Gagnon; Canada (Note: Derrick Campbell of Canada was obstructed by the Briton Nicky Gooch, who was disqualified. Campbell got up and thought he finished the race, and was celebrating his bronze medal with a Canadian Broadcasting Corporation reporter live on television when he discovered he hadn't completed the race. He had miscounted and left the track one lap short of the finish line, and was classified as a non-finisher. This meant that Marc Gagnon was a surprise bronze medalist, even though he wasn't even in the A final.)	1:33.03
5000 metre relay	Italy; Maurizio Carnino; Orazio Fagone; Hugo Herrnhof; Mirko Vuillermin	7:11.74	United States; Randy Bartz; John Coyle; Eric Flaim; Andy Gabel	7:13.37	Australia; Steven Bradbury; Kieran Hansen; Andrew Murtha; Richard Nizielski	7:13.68

=== Women's events ===
Event	Gold		Silver		Bronze	
500 metres	Cathy Turner; United States	45.98	Zhang Yanmei; China	46.44	Amy Peterson; United States	46.76
1000 metres	Chun Lee-kyung; South Korea	1:36.87	Nathalie Lambert; Canada	1:36.97	Kim So-hee; South Korea	1:37.09
3000 metre relay	South Korea; Chun Lee-kyung; Kim So-hee; Kim Yun-mi; Won Hye-kyung	4:26.64	Canada; Christine Boudrias; Isabelle Charest; Sylvie Daigle; Nathalie Lambert	4:32.04	United States; Amy Peterson; Cathy Turner; Nikki Ziegelmeyer; Karen Cashman	4:39.34

== Participating NOCs ==
Nineteen nations competed in the short track events at Lillehammer. Bulgaria, Mongolia, South Africa and Sweden made their short track debuts, while Russia and Kazakhstan competed for the first time as independent countries after having been part of the Unified Team in 1992.

- Australia (5)
- Belgium (4)
- Bulgaria (3)
- Canada (10)
- China (8)
- France (5)
- Great Britain (3)
- Italy (9)
- Japan (5)
- Kazakhstan (1)
- South Korea (7)
- Mongolia (1)
- Netherlands (5)
- New Zealand (5)
- Norway (4)
- South Africa (1)
- Russia (6)
- Sweden (1)
- United States (8)
