= Sylvain Gagnon =

Canadian short-track speed skater

Personal information
- Born: May 30, 1970 (age 56)

Sport
- Country: Canada
- Sport: Short track speed skating
Medal record
Men's short track speed skating
Representing Canada
Olympic Games
Silver medal – second place	1992 Albertville	5000 m relay
World Championships
Gold medal – first place	1993 Beijing	500m
Gold medal – first place	1993 Beijing	1000m
Gold medal – first place	1993 Beijing	1500m
Gold medal – first place	1995 Gjøvik	5000m Relay
Silver medal – second place	1993 Beijing	Overall
Silver medal – second place	1989 Solihull	5000m Relay
Silver medal – second place	1990 Amsterdam	5000m Relay
Bronze medal – third place	1993 Beijing	3000m
World Team Championships
Gold medal – first place	1995 Zoetermeer	Team

Sylvain Gagnon (born May 30, 1970) is a Canadian short track speed skater who competed in the 1992 Winter Olympics.

== Career ==
In 1992 Gagnon was a member of the Canadian relay team which won the silver medal in the 5000 metre relay competition.

== Personal life ==
Gagnon was born in Dolbeau-Mistassini, Quebec and is the older brother of Marc Gagnon.
