= Cristina Sciolla =

Italian speed skater

Personal information
- Nationality: Italian
- Born: 29 June 1965 (age 60); Turin, Italy

Sport
- Sport: Short track speed skating

Cristina Sciolla (born 29 June 1965) is an Italian short track speed skater. She competed in two events at the 1992 Winter Olympics.

At the 1988 Winter Olympic Games in Calgary, Cristina Sciolla won, together with teammates Maria Rosa Candido, Gabriella Monteduro and Barbara Mussio, the gold medal in the 3000m short track relay.
