= Justin McDonald (bobsleigh) =

Australian bobsledder

Personal information
- Nationality: Australian
- Born: 12 December 1969 (age 55); Adelaide, Australia

Sport
- Sport: Bobsleigh

Justin McDonald (born 12 December 1969) is an Australian bobsledder. He competed in the two man and the four man events at the 1994 Winter Olympics. After loaning some ballast to the Swedish team, McDonald was awarded the International Fair Play Committee's Pierre de Coubertin World Trophy.
