= Claude Nicouleau =

French speed skater (born 1961)

Personal information
- Nationality: French
- Born: 22 December 1961 (age 63); Neuilly-sur-Seine, France

Sport
- Sport: Speed skating

Claude Nicouleau (born 22 December 1961) is a French speed skater. He competed at the 1988 Winter Olympics and the 1992 Winter Olympics.
