= Glenn Carroll =

Australian bobsledder

Personal information
- Nationality: Australian
- Born: 15 June 1967 (age 57); Newcastle, New South Wales, Australia

Sport
- Sport: Bobsleigh

Australian bobsledder Glenn Carroll (born 15 June 1967) competed in the two man, and the four man events at the 1994 Winter Olympics.
