= Roberto Peretti =

Italian speed skater

Personal information
- Nationality: Italian
- Born: 12 April 1966 (age 60) Turin, Italy

Sport
- Sport: Short track speed skating
Medal record
Men's short track speed skating
Representing Italy
World Team Championships
Gold medal – first place	1993 Budapest	Team

Roberto Peretti (born 12 April 1966) is an Italian short track speed skater. He competed in the men's 5000 metre relay event at the 1992 Winter Olympics.
