= Marc Gagnon =

Canadian short track speed skater (born 1975)

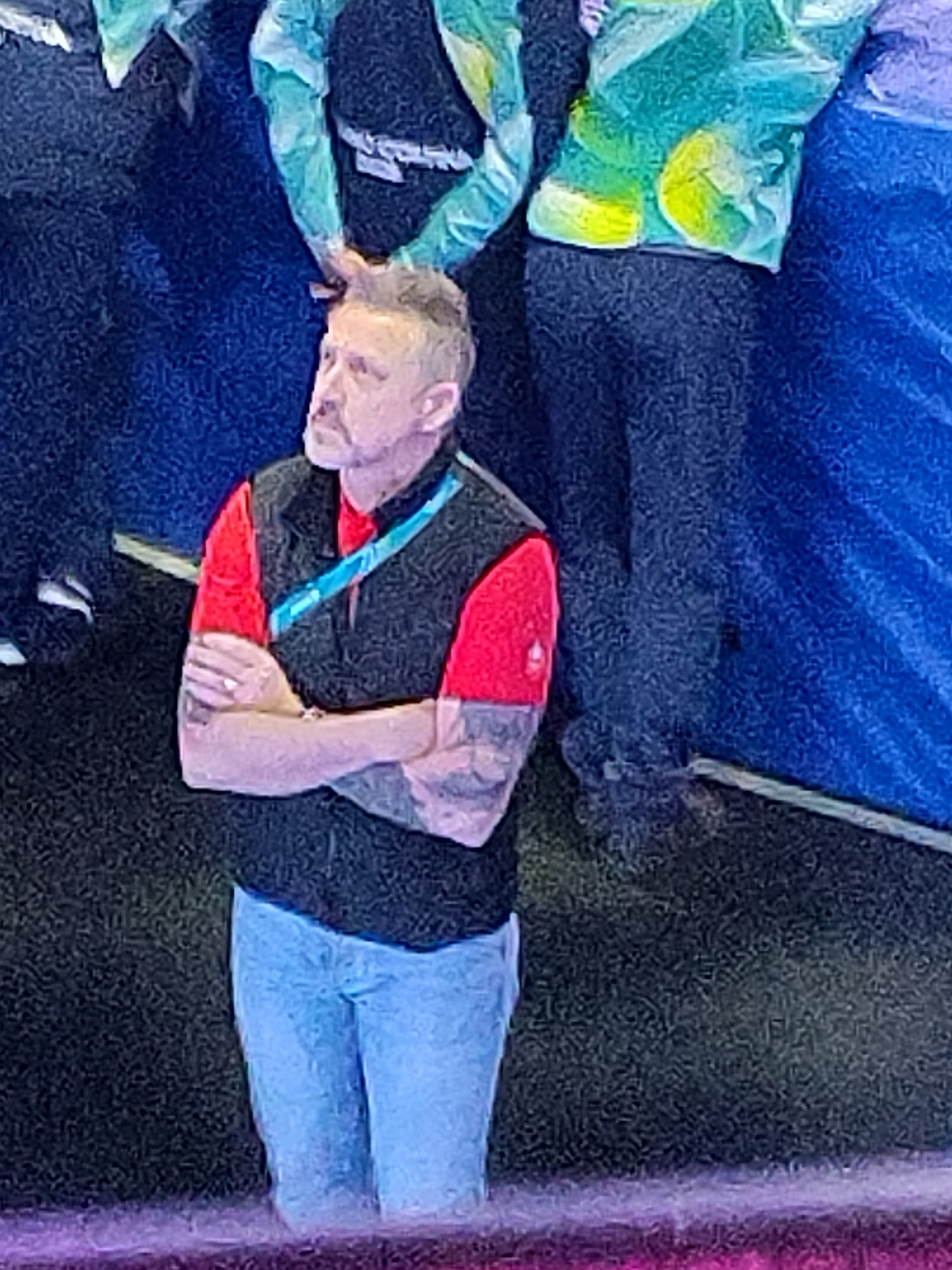
- Gagnon at the 2026 Olympics

Personal information
- Born: May 24, 1975 (age 51) Chicoutimi, Quebec, Canada

Sport
- Sport: Short track speed skating
Medal record
Men's short track speed skating
Representing Canada
Event	1st	2nd	3rd
Olympic Games	3	0	2
World Championships	14	10	5
World Team Championships	5	1	0
Olympic Games
Gold medal – first place	1998 Nagano	5000 m relay
Gold medal – first place	2002 Salt Lake City	500 m
Gold medal – first place	2002 Salt Lake City	5000 m relay
Bronze medal – third place	1994 Lillehammer	1000 m
Bronze medal – third place	2002 Salt Lake City	1500 m
World Championships
Gold medal – first place	1993 Beijing	Overall
Gold medal – first place	1993 Beijing	1000 m
Gold medal – first place	1994 Guildford	Overall
Gold medal – first place	1994 Guildford	1000 m
Gold medal – first place	1995 Gjøvik	1000 m
Gold medal – first place	1995 Gjøvik	5000 m relay
Gold medal – first place	1996 The Hague	Overall
Gold medal – first place	1996 The Hague	1500 m
Gold medal – first place	1997 Nagano	1500 m
Gold medal – first place	1998 Vienna	Overall
Gold medal – first place	1998 Vienna	1500 m
Gold medal – first place	1998 Vienna	1000 m
Gold medal – first place	1998 Vienna	5000 m relay
Gold medal – first place	2001 Jeonju	1500 m
Silver medal – second place	1993 Beijing	500 m
Silver medal – second place	1994 Guildford	1500 m
Silver medal – second place	1995 Gjøvik	Overall
Silver medal – second place	1996 The Hague	1000 m
Silver medal – second place	1996 The Hague	3000 m
Silver medal – second place	1996 The Hague	5000 m relay
Silver medal – second place	1997 Nagano	Overall
Silver medal – second place	1997 Nagano	5000 m relay
Silver medal – second place	2001 Jeonju	3000 m
Silver medal – second place	2001 Jeonju	5000 m relay
Bronze medal – third place	1993 Beijing	3000 m
Bronze medal – third place	1994 Guildford	3000 m
Bronze medal – third place	1994 Guildford	5000 m relay
Bronze medal – third place	1997 Nagano	3000 m
Bronze medal – third place	2001 Jeonju	Overall
World Team Championships
Gold medal – first place	1995 Zoetermeer	Team
Gold medal – first place	1996 Lake Placid	Team
Gold medal – first place	1998 Bormio	Team
Gold medal – first place	2000 The Hague	Team
Gold medal – first place	2001 Nobeyama	Team
Silver medal – second place	1994 Cambridge	Team

Marc Gagnon (French pronunciation: [maʁk ɡaɲɔ̃]; born May 24, 1975) is a Canadian former short track speed skater. He is a four-time Overall World Champion for 1993, 1994, 1996 and 1998, and winner of three Olympic gold medals.

== Career ==
Born in Chicoutimi, Quebec, Gagnon started his Olympic career in 1994, when he had already won the 1993 World Championships. He won a bronze in the 1000 m event. Four years later, in Nagano, Japan, Gagnon won a gold medal with the Canadian relay team. The 2002 Salt Lake City Games proved to be Gagnon's best Olympics, with a total of three medals. A bronze in the inaugural 1500 m event, and two golds; in the 500 m and again as a part of the relay team. Even his disqualification in the 1000 m was memorable, as it was the first of an improbable series of events that led to Australian Steven Bradbury winning arguably the most unlikely gold medal in Olympic history.

Winning a total of five medals in three consecutive Winter Games made him the most decorated Canadian athlete in Winter Olympic history until 2006. He has now been overtaken by long track speed skater Cindy Klassen, long track speed skater Clara Hughes and short track speed skater Charles Hamelin, who each have a total of 6 medals. Tied with track and field athlete Phil Edwards and fellow short track speed skater François-Louis Tremblay, he is one of the five most decorated Canadian athletes in all Olympic Games.

Gagnon won his World Championships in 1993, 1994, 1996 and 1998. He is the first man to have become a four-time Overall World Champion. In addition, he finished 2nd twice, and third once.

In 2007, Gagnon was inducted into the Canadian Olympic Hall of Fame and inducted into Canada's Sports Hall of Fame in 2008.
