= Mike McMillen =

New Zealand speed skater

Personal information
- Full name: Michael Rex McMillen
- Born: April 12, 1964 (age 62) Las Vegas, Nevada, U.S.

Sport
- Country: New Zealand
- Sport: Short track speed skating
Medal record
Men's short track speed skating
Representing New Zealand
World Championships
Gold medal – first place	1993 Beijing	5000 m relay
Silver medal – second place	1992 Denver	1000 m
Silver medal – second place	1991 Sydney	5000 m relay

Michael Rex McMillen (born April 12, 1964, in Las Vegas, Nevada), known as Mike McMillen, is a short track speed skater from New Zealand who has represented New Zealand at two Olympic Games.

In the 1992 Winter Olympics at Albertville, France, he was on the team which came fourth in the 5000m short-track relay event. The team narrowly missed the bronze medal by just 0.7sec. He also was a finalist in the men's 1000m event, again narrowly missing the bronze medal. He broke the world record for the 1000m during 1992.

In the 1994 Winter Olympics at Lillehammer, Norway he was in the 500m, 1000m and 5000m short-track relay events.
