= Stuart Horsepool =

British speed skater

Personal information
- Full name: Stuart James Horsepool
- Nationality: British
- Born: 18 August 1961 (age 63); Nottingham, England
- Height: 170 cm (5 ft 7 in)

Sport
- Sport: Short track speed skating

Stuart James Horsepool (born 18 August 1961) is a British short track speed skater. He competed in the men's 5000 metre relay event at the 1992 Winter Olympics.
