= Steven Bradbury =

Australian short-track speed skater (born 1973)

Steven Bradbury OAM
Personal information
- Born: 14 October 1973 (age 53) Camden, New South Wales, Australia
- Height: 5 ft 10 in (178 cm)
- Weight: 176 lb (80 kg)

Sport
- Country: Australia
- Sport: Short track speed skating
Medal record
Men's Short track speed skating
Representing Australia
Olympic Games
Gold medal – first place	2002 Salt Lake City	1000 m
Bronze medal – third place	1994 Lillehammer	5000 m relay
World Championships
Gold medal – first place	1991 Sydney	5000 m relay
Silver medal – second place	1994 Guildford	5000 m relay
Bronze medal – third place	1993 Beijing	5000 m relay

Steven John Bradbury OAM (born 14 October 1973) is an Australian former short-track speed skater and four-time Olympian. He won the gold medal at the 1,000 m event at the 2002 Winter Olympics. He was the first athlete from Australia and also the first from the Southern Hemisphere to win a Winter Olympic gold medal, and he was also part of the short-track relay team that won Australia's first Winter Olympic medal, a bronze in 1994. The nature of his gold medal win – a relative veteran and 50:1 rank outsider who had come through from last place in the final straight as the entire field ahead crashed out on the final corner – became iconic of underdog success and perseverance at the Olympic Games and in life in general, especially in Australian culture.

== 1991 World Championships and 1992 Winter Olympics ==
In 1991, Bradbury was part of the Australian quartet that won the 5,000 m relay at the World Championships in Sydney. It was Australia's first world championship in a winter sport. Australia's short-track relay team went into the 1992 Albertville Winter Olympics as world champions, but the team crashed in the semi-finals. The Australians were in third place when Richard Nizielski lost his footing; they finished fourth and failed to reach the final. Bradbury was unable to help, as he had been named as the reserve for the team and was sitting on the bench. He was not selected for any individual events.

== 1994 Winter Olympics ==
At the 1994 Winter Olympics in Norway, Bradbury was part of the short-track relay team that won Australia's first Winter Olympic medal, a bronze. It scraped into the four-team final after edging out Japan and New Zealand to finish second in its semi-final. It adopted a plan of staying on its feet as first priority, and remaining non-disqualified and beating at least one of the other three finalists. During the race, the Canadians fell and lost significant time, meaning that Australia would win their first medal if they raced conservatively and avoided a crash. Late in the race, Nizielski was fighting with his American counterpart for track position for the silver medal, but took the safe option and yielded, mindful of the lost opportunity following the crash in Albertville. Thus Bradbury, Nizielski, Andrew Murtha and Kieran Hansen became Australia's first Winter Olympics medallists.

Bradbury was also entered in the 500 m and 1,000 m individual events and was the favourite going into the latter. In the first event, Bradbury came second in his heat in a time of 45.43 s and then won his quarterfinal in a time of 44.18 s to qualify for the semifinal. In the semifinal, Bradbury was knocked over by a rival and he limped home fourth, in a time of 1 m 03.51 s and was eliminated. He came fourth in the B final and was classified eighth overall out of 31 competitors. In the 1,000 m event, Bradbury fell in his heat after being illegally pushed by a competitor who was later disqualified. He came home in 2 m 01.89 s, more than 30 s off the leaders' pace and was eliminated. Nevertheless, because of the high rate of accidents, Bradbury came 24th out of 31 competitors.

During a 1994 World Cup event in Montreal, another skater's blade sliced through Bradbury's right thigh after a collision; it cut through to the other side, resulting in him losing four litres of blood. Bradbury's heart rate had been close to 200 bpm at the end of the race and this meant that blood was being pumped out fast. All four of his quadriceps muscles had been sliced through, and Bradbury thought that he would die if he lost consciousness. The injury required 111 stitches and Bradbury could not move the leg for three weeks. His leg needed 18 months before it was back to full strength.

== 1998 Winter Olympics ==
Bradbury, Nizielski and Kieran Hansen, three of the quartet that won Australia's maiden medal in 1994, returned for the 1998 Winter Olympics in Japan with new teammate Richard Goerlitz. There were hopes that they could repeat their Lillehammer performance. However, in their qualifying race, they placed third in a time of 7 m 11.691 s and missed the final by one place, even though they had been two seconds faster than their medal-winning performance of 1994. They completed the course four seconds slower in the B final and came last in the race, and thus last out of eight teams overall.

Bradbury was again regarded as a medal contender in the individual events, but was impeded in collisions with other racers in both the 500 m and 1,000 m events. He came third in the heats of both races, posting times of 43.766 s and 1 m 33.108 s in each race. Neither of these times were fast enough to advance him to the quarterfinals and he came 19th and 21st out of 30 competitors respectively.

In September 2000, Bradbury broke his neck in a training accident. Another skater fell in front of him and Bradbury tried to jump over him, but instead clipped him and tripped head first into the barriers. As a result, Bradbury fractured his C4 and C5 vertebrae. He spent a month and a half in a halo brace, and needed four pins to be inserted in his skull and screws and plates bolted into his back and chest. Doctors told Bradbury that he would not be able to take to the ice again, but he was determined to reach another Olympics. He wanted redemption after the crashes in the individual races in 1994 and 1998, even though he conceded that he would be past his best in terms of challenging for the medals.

== 2002 Winter Olympics ==
Bradbury took an unlikely gold medal win in the men's short-track 1000 metres event at the Salt Lake City 2002 Winter Olympic Games. He won his heat convincingly in the 1,000 m, posting a time of 1:30.956. However, in the quarter-finals, Bradbury was allocated to the same race as Apolo Anton Ohno, the favourite from the host nation, and Marc Gagnon of Canada, the defending world champion. Only the top two finishers from each race would proceed to the semifinals. Bradbury finished third in his race and thought himself to be eliminated, but Gagnon was disqualified for obstructing another racer, allowing the Australian to advance to the semi-finals.

After consulting his national coach Ann Zhang, Bradbury's strategy from the semi-final onwards was to cruise behind his opponents and hope that they crashed, as he could not match their pace. His reasoning was that risk-taking by the favourites could cause a collision due to a racing incident, and, if two skaters fell, the remaining three would all get medals; additionally, as he was slower than his opponents, trying to challenge them directly would only increase his own chances of becoming part of a crash entanglement. Bradbury said that he was satisfied with his result, and he felt that, as the second-oldest competitor in the field, he was not able to match his opponents in four races on the same night.

In his semi-final race, Bradbury was in last place, well off the pace of the medal favourites. However, defending champion Kim Dong-sung of South Korea, multiple Olympic medallist Li Jiajun of China, and Mathieu Turcotte of Canada all crashed, paving the way for Bradbury to take first place and advancing him through to the final. In the final, Bradbury was again well off the pace when all four of his competitors (Ohno, Ahn Hyun-Soo, Li, and Turcotte) crashed out at the final corner while jostling for the gold medal. This allowed Bradbury, who was around 15 m behind with only 50 m to go, to avoid the pile-up and take the victory. Bradbury became the first person from a southern-hemisphere country to win a Winter Olympic event. After a period of delay, the judges upheld the result and did not order a re-race, confirming Bradbury's victory.

In an interview after winning his gold, referring to his two career- and life-threatening accidents, Bradbury said: "Obviously I wasn't the fastest skater. I don't think I'll take the medal as the minute-and-a-half of the race I actually won. I'll take it as the last decade of the hard slog I put in." He also said, "I was the oldest bloke in the field and I knew that, skating four races back to back, I wasn't going to have any petrol left in the tank. So there was no point in getting there and mixing it up because I was going to be in last place anyway. So [I figured] I might as well stay out of the way and be in last place and hope that some people get tangled up."

He later said that he never expected all of his opponents to fall, but added that he felt that the other four racers were under extreme pressure and might have over-attacked and taken too many risks. Bradbury cited the host-nation pressure on Ohno, who was expected to win all four of his events. Li, much like Bradbury himself, had won Olympic medals but was yet to take a gold medal, Turcotte only had one individual event, and Ahn had been the form racer at the Olympics so far. Bradbury felt that none would be willing to settle for less than gold and that, as a result, they might collide.

Bradbury had three other events at the 2002 Winter Olympics. In the relay event, the Australians came third in their heat in a time of 7:19.177 and failed to make the final. They came second in the B final and finished sixth out of seven teams. In the 1,500 m event, Bradbury came third in his heat, before placing fourth in the semi-final and being eliminated. He then came fifth in the B final to finish 10th out of 29 entrants. He was unable to maintain his speed through the competition; after posting a time of 2:22.632 in the heats, Bradbury slowed by three seconds in each of his next two races. In the 500 m event, Bradbury came second in his heat and was eliminated after coming third in his quarter-final. He finished 14th out of 31 overall.

=== Legacy ===
The unlikely win turned Bradbury into something of a folk hero. Many newspapers hailed Bradbury and held him as an example of the value of an underdog never giving up—regardless of the odds against them. The unusual manner of his victory made news across the world. However, some unhappy American commentators also made fun of the race and used it to criticise what they perceived as a lack of merit required to win a short-track event. USA Today said: "The first winter gold medal in the history of Australia fell out of the sky like a bagged goose. He looked like the tortoise behind four hares", while the Boston Globe said that "multiple crashes that allow the wrong person to win are part of the deal".

Bradbury's feat has entered the Australian colloquial vernacular in the phrase "doing a Bradbury", meaning an unexpected or unusual success. "Do a Bradbury" has been given the official stamp of recognition when the second edition of the Australian National Dictionary included the phrase along with more than 6,000 new words and phrases in 2016. Bradbury's triumph was celebrated by Australia Post issuing a 45-cent stamp of him, which followed on from it issuing stamps of Australian gold medallists at the 2000 Sydney Olympics. Bradbury's stamp was issued on 20 February 2002, four days after his victory. He received $20,000 for the use of his image. He said the fee "should get me a car. I haven’t had a car for a long time", and later described having a stamp issued as "a great honour". Before the Olympics, Bradbury had needed to borrow $1,000 from his parents to fix his old car to go to training.

Bradbury was courted for sponsorship after his triumph and was interviewed on many American television shows. He had previously supported himself by making skating boots in a backyard workshop; his Revolutionary Boot Company supplied Ohno with free boots, and Bradbury had asked Ohno to endorse his boots when he won in Salt Lake City, not thinking that he would defeat the American.

== Retirement ==
Bradbury retired after the 2002 Olympics. He commentated at the 2006 Winter Olympics and for the Nine Network and Foxtel at the 2010 Winter Olympics. In 2005, Bradbury was a contestant in the second series of the Australian television show Dancing with the Stars. In 2019, he competed in the sixth season of Australian Survivor. He was eliminated on Day 12 and finished in 20th place.

In March 2022, Bradbury rescued four teenage girls from drowning whilst out surfing with his son Flyn on the Sunshine Coast. For this act, he was awarded with a Commendation for Brave Conduct.

== Motor racing career ==
After retiring from skating, Bradbury participated in competitive motor racing. After placing fourth in the 2005 Australian Grand Prix Celebrity Race, he competed in Queensland state-level Formula Vee championship events in 2006 and 2007, placing sixth in both years. In 2007, he raced in the National Formula Vee Championships at Morgan Park Raceway, placing 15th.

In 2009, Bradbury competed in the Australian Mini Challenge at the Tasmanian round and 2010 at Queensland Raceway as their Uber Star. He also made a one-off appearance in the V8 Ute Series at Adelaide in March 2010, driving with regular Ute racer Jason Gomersall on the support program of the 2010 Clipsal 500.

== Honours ==
In recognition of his Olympic medal win, Bradbury was awarded the key to the City of Brisbane in 2002 and a Medal of the Order of Australia in 2007. He was also inducted into the Sport Australia Hall of Fame in that year.

In 2009, Bradbury was inducted into the Queensland Sport Hall of Fame.

In the 2023 August Bravery Honours List, Bradbury was awarded the Commendation for Brave Conduct. This recognised his role in rescuing four teenage girls caught in a rip off of King’s Beach in Caloundra, Queensland, in 2022.

== Sources ==
- Andrews, Malcolm (2000). Australia at the Olympic Games. Australian Broadcasting Corporation. ISBN 0-7333-0884-8.
- Gordon, Harry (1994). Australia and the Olympic Games. University of Queensland. ISBN 0-7022-2627-0.
- Gordon, Harry (2003). The time of our lives: inside the Sydney Olympics : Australia and the Olympic Games 1994–2002. University of Queensland. ISBN 0-7022-3412-5.
- McAvaney, Bruce (1992). The Sportsworld Year 2. Text Publishing. ISBN 1-86372-010-3.
- The Compendium: Official Australian Olympic Statistics 1896–2002. Australian Olympic Committee. 2003. ISBN 0-7022-3425-7.
- Smart, Gary; Bradbury, Steven (2005). Steven Bradbury: Last Man Standing. Geoff Slattery. ISBN 0-9757287-8-4.
