= Alain De Ruyter =

Belgian speed skater

Personal information
- Nationality: Belgian
- Born: 5 May 1969 (age 55); Knokke, Belgium

Sport
- Sport: Short track speed skating

Alain De Ruyter (born 5 May 1969) is a Belgian short track speed skater. He competed in two events at the 1992 Winter Olympics.
