= Geert Blanchart =

Belgian speed skater

Personal information
- Nationality: Belgian
- Born: 30 October 1966 (age 59) Leuven, Belgium

Sport
- Sport: Short track speed skating
Medal record
World Championships
Silver medal – second place	1991 Sydney	3000 m
Bronze medal – third place	1990 Amsterdam	1500 m
Bronze medal – third place	1990 Amsterdam	5000m Relay
Bronze medal – third place	1991 Sydney	1000 m

Geert Blanchart (born 30 October 1966) is a Belgian short track speed skater. He competed at the 1992 Winter Olympics and the 1994 Winter Olympics.

In 1993 Blanchart released his first and only single called Relax. There is not much to find about his short lived music careers except a live performance on the still popular music show called 10 om te zien.
