= Robert Dubreuil =

Canadian speed skater

Personal information
- Born: 20 April 1967 (age 59) Quebec City, Quebec, Canada

Sport
- Sport: Speed skating

Robert Dubreuil (born 20 April 1967) is a Canadian speed skater. He competed in the men's 500 metres event at the 1992 Winter Olympics.
