= Andrew Nicholson (speed skater) =

New Zealand speed skater

Andrew Thomas Nicholson (born 12 July 1970 in Auckland) is a speed skater and short track speed skater from New Zealand. He competed for New Zealand in three Winter Olympic Games. Nicholson is also an endurance cyclist and previously held the Guinness world record for around the world cycling. Nicholson started and ended this journey at Auckland International Airport, New Zealand, between 12 August and 13 December 2015. This was an unsupported ride.

In the 1992 Winter Olympics at Albertville; the team he was in came 4th in the 5000m short track speed skating relay.

In the 1994 Winter Olympics at Lillehammer; he came 27th in the 1000m short track speed skating.

In the 1998 Winter Olympics at Nagano; he came 35th in the 1000m speed skating and 40th in the 1500m speed skating.

He is a brother of cyclist and speed skater Chris Nicholson.
