= Andrew Gabel =

American short track speed skater

Andy Gabel
Personal information
- Full name: Andrew Alexander Gabel
- Born: December 23, 1964 (age 61) Chicago, Illinois, U.S.
- Height: 5 ft 11 in (180 cm)
- Weight: 170 lb (77 kg)

Sport
- Sport: Speed skating
Medal record
Men's short track speed skating
Representing the United States
Olympic Games
Silver medal – second place	1994 Lillehammer	5000 meter relay
World Championships
Bronze medal – third place	1987 Montréal	5000 m relay
Bronze medal – third place	1993 Beijing	500 m
World Team Championships
Bronze medal – third place	1995 Zoetermeer	Team

Andrew Alexander "Andy" Gabel (born December 23, 1964) is a four-time, short track speedskating U.S. Olympian (1988, 1992, 1994, 1998), and holds a silver medal as a member of the 1994 5000 meter Short Track relay team. Gabel was also a member of the National Short Track Team for the longest in U.S. Speedskating history in either Long or Short Track.

In 2013, Gabel was accused of, and to a degree acknowledged, improper sexual relations with two female skaters in the Olympic speedskating program, both aged 15 and respectively 18 and 11 years his junior at the times of the beginnings of the relationships. As a result of the accusations, Gabel resigned from the International Skating Union (ISU) and U.S. Speedskating.

== Early life ==
Gabel grew up in Northbrook, Illinois, and is the son of Andy Gabel, Sr., and Evie Gabel. He has one brother and three sisters.

Gabel attended Glenbrook North High School, and received a Bachelor of Science in Business Administration from Marquette University.

== Speedskating career ==
Gabel was a member of the National Short Track Team from 1979 to 1998, the longest in U.S. Speedskating history in either Long or Short Track; he was also a member of the National Long Track Team from 1981 to 1989. Gabel won over 75 international medals as a member of the World Short Track Team from 1987 to 1998. He also competed in 12 World Championships.

At the 1994 Lillehammer Games, Gabel won a silver medal as a member of the 5000 meter Short Track relay team, skating the fastest leg in the relay.

In 1994, Gabel was elected to the U.S. Speedskating's 15-member governing Board of Directors as an athlete representative. He was elected as the Office of Vice President in 1999 and became the sixth President in 2002, succeeding Fred Benjamin. Gabel negotiated sponsorship agreements with ADT and Qwest, during his tenure as President.

Gabel secured his Olympic Team spot during the 1998 Olympic trials in Lake Placid, NY by winning the 1000-meter and 500-meter heats, including the final 500-meter heat in 43.032 seconds, beating the old U.S. mark of 43.250 set in 1996 by Scott Koons of Cleveland, OH. The Associated Press called a 33-year-old Gabel "something of a geriatric marvel in a sport that now normally is dominated by much younger skaters."

During the 1998 Winter Games in Nagano, Japan, Gabel and Amy Peterson, the last American prospects for a medal in short track speedskating, were eliminated in the semifinals; Gabel, called "Grandpa" or "the Godfather" by his younger teammates, was knocked out in the men's 500 meter race after clipping a lane marker and tumbling into the padded boards.

Three-time Olympic medalist Peterson fell behind in the women's 1000 meter semifinal heat; that year, the U.S. Olympic team received 13 medals, matching the record set in Lillehammer.

For the 2002 Olympic Winter Games, Gabel was the Director of Figure Skating and Short Track speedskating. Gabel served as a member of the ISU Short Track World Cup Management Commission from 1998 to 2002, and is presently the Chairman of the ISU Short Track Technical Committee.

On April 26, 2003, at Anaheim, CA, Gabel was elected to the speedskating hall of fame.

=== Results ===
Olympic record
Rank	Olympic Games	Event
Also Completed / Disqualified	1992 Albertville	1000 m
14	1994 Lillehammer	500 m
9	1994 Lillehammer	1000 m
2	1994 Lillehammer	5000 m relay
7	1998 Nagano	500 m
4	1998 Nagano	1000 m
6	1998 Nagano	5000 m Relay

== Sexual misconduct ==
In late February 2013, speedskater Bridie Farrell, 31, "allege[d] she was 15 when she and Gabel, then in his 30s and a teammate, first had improper sexual contact that she said occurred multiple times in 1997 and 1998. Gabel told the [Chicago] Tribune in a statement … that he had a 'brief, inappropriate relationship with a female teammate', made no excuses for his behavior and apologized to her for it". Farrell had informed the U.S. Olympic Committee what had happened the day before the public statement. Farrell, who said "neither rape nor sexual intercourse had taken place", said she appreciated the apology from Gabel, but replied: "Adults who abuse children should not have access to children. They shouldn't be allowed in the skating rink, they shouldn't be allowed in the gym, they shouldn't be allowed on the soccer fields, the softball fields." USOC CEO Scott Blackmun "said he was glad [Farrell] chose to tell her story because it would help others in similar circumstances hear they are not alone". Farrell said, "For me to receive a phone call from Scott at the USOC meant the world to me, not because he was calling me but because maybe the U.S. Olympic Committee is understanding the amount of devastation this wreaks within our sport.… Maybe it is finally time for true, true change."

In early March 2013, Gabel resigned from the International Skating Union and U.S. Speedskating.

Also in March 2013, a second report emerged. Having heard of Farrell's experience, "Nikki Meyer, who was known by her maiden name of Nikki Ziegelmeyer when she won short track relay medals for the U.S. at the Albertville and Lillehammer Games," accused Gabel of raping her soon after she joined the Olympic training program, summer 1991. She described the alleged attack and ensuing three-year relationship in explicit detail and said, "He’s a child molester … rapist … sexual abuser [and] … pedophile". Gabel acknowledged "he made mistakes during his skating career, but strongly denied forcing himself on anyone". Meyer said she was not sure if she would "pursue criminal charges" or if she even could "because of the possible statute of limitations". But she hoped Gabel would receive "a lifetime ban from U.S. Speedskating and [removal] from the … Hall of Fame".

U.S. Speedskating said in a statement it "will not tolerate abuse of any kind [and], through a referral from the U.S. Olympic Committee’s Safe Sport program", and hired the law firm Sidley Austin LLP "to investigate all accusations involving Gabel".

== Post-skating career ==
Gabel was also Principal and Client Relationship Officer for Barclays Global Investors.

In August 2004, he joined The Bonham Group, a Denver-based sports marketing company; he was responsible for new business development, business planning and budgeting.

Gabel has also been a commentator for various short track speedskating events on ABC's Wide World of Sports, ESPN, and the Outdoor Life Network. He served as commentator and analyst for short track events at the 2010 Winter Games in Vancouver.

== See also ==
- List of select Jewish speed skaters
