= Li Lianli =

Chinese speed skater

Personal information
- Nationality: Chinese
- Born: 6 October 1974 (age 50); Changchun, China

Sport
- Sport: Short track speed skating

Li Lianli (born 6 October 1974) is a Chinese short track speed skater. He competed at the 1992 Winter Olympics and the 1994 Winter Olympics.
