= Michel Daignault =

Short-track speed skater

Personal information
- Born: June 25, 1966 (age 60) Montreal, Quebec, Canada

Sport
- Sport: Short track speed skating
Medal record
Men's short track speed skating
Representing Canada
Olympic Games
Silver medal – second place	1992 Albertville	5000 m relay
World Championships
Gold medal – first place	1984 Peterborough	5000 m relay
Gold medal – first place	1987 Montréal	Overall
Gold medal – first place	1989 Solihul	Overall
Silver medal – second place	1985 Amsterdam	5000 m relay
Silver medal – second place	1986 Chamonix	5000 m relay
Silver medal – second place	1989 Solihul	5000 m relay
Silver medal – second place	1990 Amsterdam	1000 m
Silver medal – second place	1990 Amsterdam	5000 m relay
Bronze medal – third place	1984 Peterborough	Overall

Michel Daignault (born June 25, 1966) is a Canadian short track speed skater who competed in the 1988 Winter Olympics and in the 1992 Winter Olympics. He is a two-time Overall World Champion, having won the titles in 1987 (shared) and 1989.

== Career ==
In 1988 he competed in the first short track speed skating events at the Olympics when this sport was a demonstration sport. He was a member of the Canadian relay team which finished third in the 5000 metre relay competition. He also finished third in the 3000 metres event and second in the 1000 metres contest.

In 1992 he was a member of the Canadian relay team which won the silver medal in the 5000 metre relay competition. In the 1000 m event he finished eighth.

== Personal life ==
He was born in Montreal, Quebec and is the older brother of Laurent Daignault.
