= Nicholas Cleaver =

Australian freestyle skier

Nicholas Cleaver (born 9 May 1975) is an Australian freestyle skier, who represented Australia in the Winter Olympics, in 1992 and 1994. He competed in the men's moguls and placed 11th out of 47 in 1992. He came 16th out of 29 in 1994.
