= World Short Track Speed Skating Championships =

Senior international short track speed skating competition

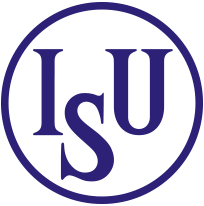
- Status: Active
- Genre: Sporting event
- Date: Varying
- Frequency: Annual
- Country: Varying
- Inaugurated: 1976
- Organiser: International Skating Union

The World Short Track Speed Skating Championships are a senior international short track speed skating competition held once a year to determine the World Champion in individual distances, relays and Overall Classification. It is sanctioned by the International Skating Union and is usually held in March or April.

In 1967, the International Skating Union adopted short track speed skating, although it did not organise international competitions until 1976. World Championships have been held since 1981, though earlier events later received that status.

Skaters perform individual races in the 500 meters, 1000 meters, 1500 meters, 3000 meters (super-final involving eight competitors with highest points after completion of other distances) and a four-person race, in the 3000 meters relay for women, and the 5000 meters relay for men. Points are given for each placings in the finals of individual distances (currently 34 points for 1st, 21 for 2nd, 13 for 3rd, 8 for 4th, 5 for 5th, 3 for 6th, 2 for 7th, 1 for 8th). From 2009, the leader after first 1000m in the 3000m super-final is given extra 5 points. The athlete with the highest points after the points for all individual distances are added up (maximum 141 points, 136 points before 2009) is declared the Men's or Ladies' Overall World Short-track Speed Skating Champion. In case of a tie in points, precedence is given to the athlete with higher placing in the 3000m super-final.

The 2020 edition was supposed to be held in Seoul, South Korea, from 13 to 15 March 2020 but had been postponed after authorities ordered the closure of the Mokdong Ice Rink due to the outbreak of the coronavirus. The International Skating Union initially announced they were trying to reschedule the tournament to the beginning of the 2020–21 season but cancelled the event on 16 April 2020.

== Summary ==
1976-1977: as a world event (World Competition)

1978-1980: as ISU championship

1981-now: as ISU World Championship

Edition	Year	Host	Events
1	1976	(United States) Champaign	13
2	1977	(France) Grenoble	10
3	1978	(United Kingdom) Solihull	4
4	1979	(Canada) Québec	4
5	1980	(Italy) Milan	4
6	1981	(France) Meudon	4
7	1982	(Canada) Moncton	10
8	1983	(Japan) Tokyo	12
9	1984	(United Kingdom) Peterborough	12
10	1985	(Netherlands) Amsterdam	4
11	1986	(France) Chamonix	4
12	1987	(Canada) Montréal	5
13	1988	(United States) St. Louis	4
14	1989	(United Kingdom) Solihull	4
15	1990	(Netherlands) Amsterdam	4
16	1991	(Australia) Sydney	4
17	1992	(United States) Denver	4
18	1993	(China) Beijing	4
19	1994	(United Kingdom) Guildford	4
20	1995	(Norway) Gjøvik	12
21	1996	(Netherlands) The Hague	12
22	1997	(Japan) Nagano	10
23	1998	(Austria) Vienna	10
24	1999	(Bulgaria) Sofia	12
25	2000	(United Kingdom) Sheffield	12
26	2001	(South Korea) Jeonju	12

Edition	Year	Host	Events
27	2002	(Canada) Montreal	12
28	2003	(Poland) Warsaw	12
29	2004	(Sweden) Gothenburg	12
30	2005	(China) Beijing	10
31	2006	(United States) Minneapolis	10
32	2007	(Italy) Milan	10
33	2008	(South Korea) Gangneung	10
34	2009	(Austria) Vienna	10
35	2010	(Bulgaria) Sofia	10
36	2011	(United Kingdom) Sheffield	10
37	2012	(China) Shanghai	10
38	2013	(Hungary) Debrecen	10
39	2014	(Canada) Montréal	10
40	2015	(Russia) Moscow	10
41	2016	(South Korea) Seoul	10
42	2017	(Netherlands) Rotterdam	10
43	2018	(Canada) Montréal	10
44	2019	(Bulgaria) Sofia	10
45	2021	(Netherlands) Dordrecht	10
46	2022	(Canada) Montréal	10
47	2023	(South Korea) Seoul	9
48	2024	(Netherlands) Rotterdam	9
49	2025	(China) Beijing	9
50	2026	(Canada) Montréal	9
51	2027	(South Korea) Seoul	9

- 2020 Edition in Seoul was cancelled.

== Overall classification medalists ==
=== Men ===
Season	Location	Winner	Runner-up	Third
1976	Champaign	(United States) Alan Rattray	(Canada) Gaetan Boucher	(France) Andre Chabrerie
1977	Grenoble	(Canada) Gaetan Boucher	(United States) Craig Kressler	(Japan) Hiroshi Toda
1978	Solihull	(Australia) James Lynch	(United Kingdom) Harry Spragg	(United States) Alan Rattray
1979	Québec	(Japan) Hiroshi Toda	(Canada) Louis Baril	(United States) Nick Thometz
1980	Milan	(Canada) Gaetan Boucher (2)	(Canada) Louis Gernier	(France) Marc Bella
1981	Meudon	(Canada) Benoit Baril	(Canada) Gaetan Boucher	(Australia) Michael Richmond
1982	Moncton	(Canada) Guy Daignault	(Canada) Gaetan Boucher	(Canada) Louis Gernier
1983	Tokyo	(Canada) Louis Gernier	(Canada) Michel Delisle	(Canada) Guy Daignault
1984	Peterborough	(Canada) Guy Daignault (2)	(Japan) Tatsuyoshi Ishihara	(Canada) Michel Daignault
1985	Amsterdam	(Japan) Toshinobu Kawai	(Japan) Tatsuyoshi Ishihara	(Canada) Louis Gernier
1986	Chamonix	(Japan) Tatsuyoshi Ishihara	(Canada) Guy Daignault	(Canada) Robert Dubreuil
1987	Montréal	(Canada) Michel Daignault (Japan) Toshinobu Kawai (2)	none awarded	(Netherlands) Charles Veldhoven
1988	St. Louis	(Netherlands) Peter van der Velde	(Netherlands) Richard Suyten	(Japan) Tatsuyoshi Ishihara
1989	Solihull	(Canada) Michel Daignault (2)	(South Korea) Kim Ki-Hoon	(Canada) Mark Lackie
1990	Amsterdam	(South Korea) Lee Joon-Ho	(Japan) Yuichi Akasaka (United Kingdom) Wilf O'Reilly	none awarded
1991	Sydney	(United Kingdom) Wilf O'Reilly	(South Korea) Kim Ki-Hoon	(South Korea) Lee Joon-Ho
1992	Denver	(South Korea) Kim Ki-Hoon	(South Korea) Mo Ji-Soo	(South Korea) Lee Joon-Ho
1993	Beijing	(Canada) Marc Gagnon	(Canada) Sylvain Gagnon	(South Korea) Chae Ji-Hoon (South Korea) Kim Ki-Hoon
1994	Guildford	(Canada) Marc Gagnon	(South Korea) Chae Ji-Hoon (Canada) Frederic Blackburn	none awarded
1995	Gjøvik	(South Korea) Chae Ji-Hoon	(Canada) Marc Gagnon	(South Korea) Song Jae-Kun
1996	The Hague	(Canada) Marc Gagnon	(South Korea) Chae Ji-Hoon	(Italy) Orazio Fagone
1997	Nagano	(South Korea) Kim Dong-Sung	(Canada) Marc Gagnon	(Canada) Derrick Campbell
1998	Vienna	(Canada) Marc Gagnon (4)	(Italy) Fabio Carta	(South Korea) Kim Dong-Sung
1999	Sofia	(China) Li Jiajun	(Japan) Satoru Terao	(Italy) Fabio Carta
2000	Sheffield	(South Korea) Min Ryoung	(Canada) Éric Bédard	(China) Li Jiajun
2001	Jeonju	(China) Li Jiajun (2)	(United States) Apolo Anton Ohno	(Canada) Marc Gagnon
2002	Montreal	(South Korea) Kim Dong-Sung (2)	(South Korea) Ahn Hyun-Soo	(Italy) Fabio Carta
2003	Warsaw	(South Korea) Ahn Hyun-Soo	(China) Li Jiajun	(South Korea) Song Suk-Woo
2004	Gothenburg	(South Korea) Ahn Hyun-Soo	(South Korea) Song Suk-Woo	(China) Li Jiajun
2005	Beijing	(South Korea) Ahn Hyun-Soo	(United States) Apolo Anton Ohno	(Canada) François-Louis Tremblay
2006	Minneapolis	(South Korea) Ahn Hyun-Soo	(South Korea) Lee Ho-Suk	(Canada) François-Louis Tremblay
2007	Milan	(South Korea) Ahn Hyun-Soo	(Canada) Charles Hamelin	(United States) Apolo Anton Ohno
2008	Gangneung	(United States) Apolo Anton Ohno	(South Korea) Lee Ho-Suk	(South Korea) Song Kyung-Taek
2009	Vienna	(South Korea) Lee Ho-Suk	(United States) J.R. Celski	(Canada) Charles Hamelin
2010	Sofia	(South Korea) Lee Ho-Suk (2)	(South Korea) Kwak Yoon-Gy	(China) Liang Wenhao
2011	Sheffield	(South Korea) Noh Jin-Kyu	(Canada) Charles Hamelin	(China) Liang Wenhao
2012	Shanghai	(South Korea) Kwak Yoon-Gy	(South Korea) Noh Jin-Kyu	(Canada) Olivier Jean
2013	Debrecen	(South Korea) Sin Da-Woon	(South Korea) Kim Yun-Jae	(Canada) Charles Hamelin
2014	Montréal	(Russia) Viktor An (6)	(United States) J.R. Celski	(Canada) Charles Hamelin
2015	Moscow	(Netherlands) Sjinkie Knegt	(South Korea) Park Se-yeong	(China) Wu Dajing
2016	Seoul	(China) Han Tianyu	(Canada) Charles Hamelin	(Hungary) Shaolin Sándor Liu
2017	Rotterdam	(South Korea) Seo Yi-ra	(Netherlands) Sjinkie Knegt	(Canada) Samuel Girard
2018	Montréal	(Canada) Charles Hamelin	(Hungary) Shaolin Sándor Liu	(South Korea) Hwang Dae-Heon
2019	Sofia	(South Korea) Lim Hyo-jun	(South Korea) Hwang Dae-heon	(Russia) Semion Elistratov
2020	Seoul	Cancelled due to the COVID-19 pandemic		
2021	Dordrecht	(Hungary) Shaoang Liu	(Hungary) Shaolin Sándor Liu	RSU Semion Elistratov
2022	Montréal	(Hungary) Shaoang Liu (2)	(Canada) Pascal Dion	(South Korea) Lee June-seo

=== Ladies ===
Season	Location	Winner	Runner-up	Third
1976	Champaign	(United States) Celeste Chlapaty	(Canada) Kathy Vogt	(United States) Peggy Hartrich
1977	Grenoble	(Canada) Brenda Webster	(Canada) Kathy Vogt	(United States) Valie Reimann
1978	Solihull	(United States) Sarah Docter	(Japan) Miyoshi Kato	(United States) Patty Lyman
1979	Québec	(Canada) Sylvie Daigle	(Canada) Cathy Turnbull	(Japan) Miyoshi Kato
1980	Milan	(Japan) Miyoshi Kato	(Japan) Mika Kato	(Canada) Cathy Turnbull
1981	Meudon	(Japan) Miyoshi Kato (2)	(Japan) Mika Kato	(Canada) Louise Begin
1982	Moncton	(Canada) Maryse Perreault	(Canada) Louise Begin	(Canada) Sylvie Daigle
1983	Tokyo	(Canada) Sylvie Daigle	(Japan) Mika Kato	(Japan) Miyoshi Kato (Canada) Maryse Perreault
1984	Peterborough	(Japan) Mariko Kinoshita	(Canada) Sylvie Daigle	(United States) Bonnie Blair (Canada) Nathalie Lambert
1985	Amsterdam	(Japan) Eiko Shishii	(United States) Bonnie Blair	(Canada) Nathalie Lambert
1986	Chamonix	(United States) Bonnie Blair	(Canada) Nathalie Lambert (Canada) Maryse Perreault	none awarded
1987	Montréal	(Japan) Eiko Shishii (2)	(Canada) Nathalie Lambert	(Japan) Mariko Kinoshita
1988	St. Louis	(Canada) Sylvie Daigle	(Japan) Yumiko Yamada	(Japan) Eiko Shishii
1989	Solihull	(Canada) Sylvie Daigle	(Canada) Maryse Perreault	(China) Guo Hongru
1990	Amsterdam	(Canada) Sylvie Daigle (5)	(Netherlands) Joelle van Koestveld	(Canada) Eden Donatelli
1991	Sydney	(Canada) Nathalie Lambert	(Canada) Sylvie Daigle	(China) Zhang Yanmei
1992	Denver	(South Korea) Kim So-hee	(China) Yan Li	(Japan) Nobuku Yamada
1993	Beijing	(Canada) Nathalie Lambert	(South Korea) Chun Lee-kyung	(China) Zhang Yanmei
1994	Guildford	(Canada) Nathalie Lambert (3)	(South Korea) Kim So-hee	(South Korea) Kim Ryang-hee
1995	Gjøvik	(South Korea) Chun Lee-kyung	(China) Wang Chunlu	(South Korea) Kim Yoon-mi
1996	The Hague	(South Korea) Chun Lee-kyung	(South Korea) Won Hye-kyung	(Canada) Isabelle Charest
1997	Nagano	(South Korea) Chun Lee-kyung (3) (China) Yang Yang (A)	none awarded	(South Korea) Won Hye-kyung
1998	Vienna	(China) Yang Yang (A)	(South Korea) Chun Lee-kyung (China) Wang Chunlu	none awarded
1999	Sofia	(China) Yang Yang (A)	(China) Yang Yang (S)	(South Korea) Kim Moon-jung
2000	Sheffield	(China) Yang Yang (A)	(South Korea) An Sang-mi	(China) Yang Yang (S)
2001	Jeonju	(China) Yang Yang (A)	(China) Wang Chunlu	(Bulgaria) Evgenia Radanova
2002	Montréal	(China) Yang Yang (A) (6)	(South Korea) Ko Gi-hyun	(Bulgaria) Evgenia Radanova
2003	Warsaw	(South Korea) Choi Eun-kyung	(China) Yang Yang (A)	(South Korea) Kim Min-jee
2004	Gothenburg	(South Korea) Choi Eun-kyung (2)	(China) Wang Meng	(South Korea) Byun Chun-sa
2005	Beijing	(South Korea) Jin Sun-yu	(South Korea) Choi Eun-kyung	(South Korea) Kang Yun-mi
2006	Minneapolis	(South Korea) Jin Sun-yu	(China) Wang Meng	(Canada) Kalyna Roberge
2007	Milan	(South Korea) Jin Sun-yu (3)	(South Korea) Jung Eun-ju	(Canada) Kalyna Roberge
2008	Gangneung	(China) Wang Meng	(China) Zhou Yang	(South Korea) Yang Shin-young
2009	Vienna	(China) Wang Meng	(South Korea) Kim Min-jung	(China) Zhou Yang
2010	Sofia	(South Korea) Park Seung-hi	(China) Wang Meng	(South Korea) Cho Ha-ri
2011	Sheffield	(South Korea) Cho Ha-ri	(United States) Katherine Reutter	(Italy) Arianna Fontana
2012	Shanghai	(China) Li Jianrou	(Canada) Valérie Maltais	(Italy) Arianna Fontana
2013	Debrecen	(China) Wang Meng (3)	(South Korea) Park Seung-hi	(South Korea) Shim Suk-hee
2014	Montréal	(South Korea) Shim Suk-hee	(South Korea) Park Seung-hi	(Canada) Valérie Maltais
2015	Moscow	(South Korea) Choi Min-jeong	(Italy) Arianna Fontana	(South Korea) Shim Suk-hee
2016	Seoul	(South Korea) Choi Min-jeong	(Canada) Marianne St-Gelais	(United Kingdom) Elise Christie
2017	Rotterdam	(United Kingdom) Elise Christie	(Canada) Marianne St-Gelais	(South Korea) Shim Suk-hee
2018	Montréal	(South Korea) Choi Min-jeong	(South Korea) Shim Suk-hee	(China) Li Jinyu
2019	Sofia	(Netherlands) Suzanne Schulting	(South Korea) Choi Min-jeong	(Canada) Kim Boutin
2020	Seoul	Cancelled due to the COVID-19 pandemic		
2021	Dordrecht	(Netherlands) Suzanne Schulting (2)	(Canada) Courtney Sarault	(Italy) Arianna Fontana
2022	Montréal	(South Korea) Choi Min-jeong (4)	(Canada) Kim Boutin	(Netherlands) Xandra Velzeboer

== All-time medal count ==
After the 2025 World Short Track Speed Skating Championships.

Rank	Nation	Gold	Silver	Bronze	Total
1	South Korea	117	85	74	276
2	Canada	73	89	75	237
3	China	69	51	45	165
4	Netherlands	26	18	21	65
5	United States	17	18	33	68
6	Japan	13	19	22	54
7	Great Britain	7	10	20	37
8	Hungary	7	4	2	13
9	Italy	6	17	25	48
10	Russia	3	5	9	17
11	Australia	2	5	4	11
12	Belgium	1	3	2	6
13	Poland	0	2	3	5
14	Kazakhstan	0	2	0	2
15	France	0	1	0	1
Totals (15 entries)		341	329	335	1,005

== Hosting tally ==
Times hosted	Host country
7	Canada
6	Great Britain
5	Netherlands
4	United States, South Korea (Note: Includes the cancelled 2020 edition), China
3	France, Bulgaria
2	Austria, Italy, Japan
1	Sweden, Norway, Hungary, Poland, Australia, Russia

== Records ==
=== Largest number of titles ===
- Men: (South Korea) Ahn Hyun Soo / (Russia) Viktor An: 6 (2003–2007, 2014)
- Ladies: (China) Yang Yang (A) : 6 (1997–2002)

=== Most consecutive titles ===
- Men: (South Korea) Ahn Hyun-Soo: 5 (2003–2007)
- Ladies: (China) Yang Yang (A): 6 (1997–2002)

=== Gold medal sweeps ===
- Men: 2002 ( (South Korea) Kim Dong-Sung)
- Men: 1992 ( (South Korea) Kim Ki-Hoon)
- Ladies: 1983 ( (Canada) Sylvie Daigle) – relay title not awarded despite the win in the race
- Ladies: 2021 ( (Netherlands) Suzanne Schulting)

=== Medal sweeps ===
- Men: 1982–1983 ( Canada), 1992 ( South Korea), 2025 ( Canada)
- Ladies: 1982 ( Canada), 2005 ( South Korea)

== See also ==
- List of World Short Track Speed Skating Championships medalists
- World Short Track Speed Skating Team Championships
- World Junior Short Track Speed Skating Championships
- World Speed Skating Championships
- Short Track Speed Skating World Cup
- Short Track World Tour
- Short track speed skating
