= Kim Ki-hoon =

Short-track speed skater (born 1967)

Personal information
- Born: July 14, 1967 (age 59)

Sport
- Country: South Korea
- Sport: Short track speed skating
- Retired: 1998

Achievements and titles
- World finals: World Championship; 1992 Overall
Medal record
Event	1st	2nd	3rd
Olympic Games	3	0	0
World Championships	7	6	3
World Team Championships	2	1	0
Winter Universiade	7	0	1
Asian Games	3	1	1
Total	19	7	4
Representing South Korea
Olympic Games
Gold medal – first place	1994 Lillehammer	1000 m
Gold medal – first place	1992 Albertville	1000 m
Gold medal – first place	1992 Albertville	5000 m relay
Olympic Games (Demonstration)
Gold medal – first place	1988 Calgary	1500m
World Championships
Gold medal – first place	1989 Solihull	1000m
Gold medal – first place	1991 Sydney	500m
Gold medal – first place	1992 Denver	Overall
Gold medal – first place	1992 Denver	500m
Gold medal – first place	1992 Denver	1000m
Gold medal – first place	1992 Denver	1500m
Gold medal – first place	1992 Denver	3000m SF
Silver medal – second place	1989 Solihul	Overall
Silver medal – second place	1989 Solihul	1500m
Silver medal – second place	1989 Solihul	3000m SF
Silver medal – second place	1991 Sydney	Overall
Silver medal – second place	1993 Beijing	1500m
Silver medal – second place	1993 Beijing	3000m SF
Bronze medal – third place	1988 St. Louis	5000 m relay
Bronze medal – third place	1989 Solihull	5000 m relay
Bronze medal – third place	1994 Gilford	500m
World Team Championships
Gold medal – first place	1992 Minamimaki	Team
Gold medal – first place	1994 Cambridge	Team
Silver medal – second place	1991 Seoul	Team
Winter Universiade
Gold medal – first place	1989 Sofia	1000 m
Gold medal – first place	1989 Sofia	1500 m
Gold medal – first place	1989 Sofia	5000 m relay
Gold medal – first place	1991 Sapporo	500 m
Gold medal – first place	1991 Sapporo	1000 m
Gold medal – first place	1991 Sapporo	1500 m
Gold medal – first place	1991 Sapporo	3000 m
Bronze medal – third place	1989 Sofia	500 m
Asian Games
Gold medal – first place	1990 Sapporo	1000 m
Gold medal – first place	1990 Sapporo	1500 m
Gold medal – first place	1990 Sapporo	5000 m relay
Silver medal – second place	1990 Sapporo	500 m
Bronze medal – third place	1986 Sapporo	1500 m

- Kim Ki-hoon
- Hangul: 김기훈
- Hanja: 金琪焄
- RR: Gim Gihun
- MR: Kim Kihun

Kim Ki-hoon (born July 14, 1967) is a retired short-track speed skater and the first gold medalist in the Winter Olympics for South Korea. Kim is a three-time Olympic Champion and 1992 Overall World Champion.

== Career ==
Kim first garnered attention when he participated in the short-track demonstration event at the 1988 Winter Olympics in Calgary, winning the gold medal in the 1500 metres.

Kim swept all the gold medals available in short-track speed skating at the 1992 Winter Olympics in Albertville, winning won the gold medal in the 1000 metres in a world record time of 1:30.76, and claiming another gold in the 5000 metre relay in a world record time of 7:14.02. Kim went on to win his first world overall champion at the 1992 World Short Track Speed Skating Championships in Denver. At the championships, Kim captured all five individual gold medals (overall, 500 m, 1000 m, 1500 m, 3000 m), which made him become the second skater to sweep all five individual world championship gold medals available (Canada's Sylvie Daigle first achieved the feat at the 1983 World Championships), and the first male one.

Kim Ki-hoon defended his gold medal at the 1994 Winter Olympics in Lillehammer, winning the 1000 metres with a time of 1:34.57.

== Post career ==
In 2002, Kim was appointed as a coach of the Korean national short-track speed-skating team. He participated in the 2010 Winter Olympics in Vancouver as the head coach of the South Korean national team.

Kim Ki-hoon is known as the leader who helped Viktor An (Ahn Hyun-soo) to become a world-class player.

In addition, the Korean national team won two gold, four silver and two bronze medals at the 2010 Vancouver Olympics, while he headed the team. However, in March 2010, the match-fixing between the two Olympic medalists, Lee Jung-su and Kwak Yoon-gy, and the deal for the right to participate in the Olympics and the World Championships became a big issue in the Korean society, and they received a three-years suspension from the Korea Sports Council after it was confirmed that it took place under the instructions and supervision of the coaches. The Korean Sport & Olympic Committee did not pay Kim the reward that successfully led the Olympics at the time. In August 2012, Kim filed a lawsuit with the Korean Sport & Olympic Committee and won a court lawsuit and was able to receive his Olympic reward three years later.

He was the head of the Gangneung Athletes' Village during the 2018 Pyeongchang Olympics.

Kim is currently serving as a full professor at Ulsan College.
