= Andrew Murtha =

Short track speed skater

Medal record

Men's short track speed skating

Representing Australia

Olympic Games
Bronze medal – third place	1994 Lillehammer	5,000 m relay

Andrew Murtha (born 19 October 1965 in Parramatta, New South Wales) is an Australian short track speed skater who competed in the 1992 Winter Olympics and in the 1994 Winter Olympics.

In 1991, Murtha was part of the Australian quartet that won the 5,000 m relay at the World Championships in 1991 in Sydney. It was the first time that Australia had won a World Championship in a winter sport.

Australia's short track relay team went into the 1992 Olympics as world champions, but the team crashed in the semi-finals. The Australians were in third place when Richard Nizielski lost his footing; they finished fourth and failed to reach the final. Murtha and his teammates finished seventh overall.

Murtha also competed in the individual 1,000 metre event along with Nizielski and finished 19th out of 27 competitors.

In 1994, Murtha was part of the short track relay team won Australia's first Winter Olympic medal, a bronze. They scraped into the four-team final after edging out Japan and New Zealand to finish second in their semi-final. They adopted a plan of staying on their feet as first priority, and remaining undisqualified and beating at least one of the other three finalists. During the race, the Canadians fell and lost significant time, meaning that Australia would win their first medal if they raced conservatively and avoided a crash. Late in the race, Nizielski was fighting with his American counterpart for track position for the silver medal, but took the safe option and yielded, mindful of the lost opportunity following the crash in Albertville. Thus Murtha, Nizielski, Kieran Hansen and Steven Bradbury became Australia's first Winter Olympics medallists. Murtha did not compete in the individual events in 1994, as his three teammates were preferred instead.

In 1998, Murtha attended the Olympics as the section manager of Australia's short track team. The remaining three members of the Lillehammer relay team, Bradbury, Nizielski and Hansen, returned with new teammate Richard Goerlitz, and there were hopes that they could repeat their Lillehammer performance. However, in their qualifying race, they placed third in a time of 7 m 11.691 s and missed the final by one place, even though they had been two seconds faster than their medal-winning performance in 1994. They completed the course four seconds slower in the B final and came last in the race, and thus last out of eight teams overall. Bradbury was the only Australian entered into the individual events and he came 19th and 21st out of 30 in the two races.

In his early years, Murtha and Hansen learned to skate at the Blacktown Ice Racing Club, in the outer western working-class suburb of Blacktown. Hansen's mother Helen said "These boys are pure western suburbs – kids with a one-track mind", attributing their success to their determination.

During his career, Murtha trained at Canterbury Olympic Rink, in the western Sydney suburb of Canterbury, New South Wales. His training colleagues included Hansen and Winter Olympic figure skaters Steven and Danielle Carr. Murtha supported himself by working for the City of Canterbury local government association. In 2008, a plaque in honour of Murtha was unveiled by the City of Canterbury. In 1991 and 1994, the years that Australia won medals in the short track relay, Murtha was named by the City of Blacktown as their Sportsperson of the Year.
