= Kieran Hansen =

Short track speed skater

Olympic medal record

Men's Short Track Speed Skating

Representing Australia
Bronze medal – third place	1994 Lillehammer	5,000 m relay

Kieran Hansen (born 16 November 1971, in Sydney) is an Australian short track speed skater who competed in the 1992 Winter Olympics, in the 1994 Winter Olympics, and in the 1998 Winter Olympics.

In 1991, Hansen was part of the Australian quartet that won the 5,000 m relay at the World Championships in 1991 in Sydney. It was the first time that Australia had won a World Championship in a winter sport.

Australia's short track relay team went into the 1992 Olympics as world champions, but the team crashed in the semi-finals. The Australians were in third place when Richard Nizielski lost his footing; they finished fourth and failed to reach the final. Hansen and his teammates finished seventh overall.

In 1994, Hansen was part of the short track relay team won Australia's first Winter Olympic medal, a bronze. They scraped into the four-team final after edging out Japan and New Zealand to finish second in their semi-final. They adopted a plan of staying on their feet as first priority, and remaining undisqualified and beating at least one of the other three finalists. During the race, the Canadians fell and lost significant time, meaning that Australia would win their first medal if they raced conservatively and avoided a crash. Late in the race, Nizielski was fighting with his American counterpart for track position for the silver medal, but took the safe option and yielded, mindful of the lost opportunity following the crash in Albertville. Thus Hansen, Nizielski, Andrew Murtha and Steven Bradbury became Australia's first Winter Olympics medallists.

In the 1,000 m event he came second in his heat and then came third in his quarterfinal and was eliminated; he finished eleventh. In the 500-metre contest he came third in his heat and was eliminated and finished 23rd.

Bradbury, Nizielski and Hansen, three of the quartet that won Australia's maiden medal in 1994 returned with new teammate Richard Goerlitz, and there were hopes that they could repeat their Lillehammer performance. However, in their qualifying race, they placed third in a time of 7 m 11.691 s and missed the final by one place, even though they had been two seconds faster than their medal-winning performance in 1994. They completed the course four seconds slower in the B final and came last in the race, and thus last out of eight teams overall. Hansen was not selected in any of the individual events. At this Olympics, Hansen skated under Murtha, who acted as the manager of the team.

In his early years, Murtha and Hansen learned to skate at the Blacktown Ice Racing Club, in the outer western working-class suburb of Blacktown. Hansen's mother Helen said "These boys are pure western suburbs – kids with a one-track mind", attributing their success to their determination. During his career, Hansen trained at Canterbury Olympic Rink, in the western Sydney suburb of Canterbury, New South Wales. His training colleagues included Murtha and Winter Olympic figure skaters Steven and Danielle Carr.

Hansen later introduced Jeremy Rolleston to winter sports. Rolleston was a rugby sevens player and had trouble believing Hansen at first, but eventually agreed to submit himself to physical aptitude tests. Rolleston went on to compete at the 2006 Winter Olympics in the two-man bobsled.
