= Laurent Daignault =

Short-track speed skater

Personal information
- Born: October 30, 1968 (age 57) Montreal, Quebec, Canada
Medal record
Men's short track speed skating
Representing Canada
Silver medal – second place	1992 Albertville	5000 m relay

Laurent Daignault (born October 30, 1968) is a Canadian short track speed skater who competed in the 1992 Winter Olympics.

He was born in Montreal, Quebec and is the younger brother of Michel Daignault.

In 1992 he was a member of the Canadian relay team which won the silver medal in the 5000 metre relay competition.
