= Song Jae-kun =

Short track speed skater

Olympic medal record

Representing South Korea

Men's short track speed skating
Gold medal – first place	1992 Albertville	5000 m relay

Song Jae-Kun (Korean: 송재근; Hanja: 宋在根; born 15 February 1974) is a South Korean short track speed skater, who won a gold medal in the 5000 m relay at the 1992 Winter Olympics together with teammates Ki-Hoon Kim, Lee Joon-Ho and Moo Ji-Soo.
