= Lee Joon-ho (speed skater) =

South Korean short track speed skater (born 1965)

Personal information
- Born: September 7, 1965 (age 61) Seoul, South Korea
- Height: 1.71 m (5 ft 7 in)
- Weight: 65 kg (143 lb; 10.2 st)

Korean name
- Hangul: 이준호
- Hanja: 李準鎬
- RR: I Junho
- MR: I Chunho

Sport
- Country: South Korea
- Sport: Short track speed skating
- Retired: 1995

Achievements and titles
- World finals: World Championship; 1990 (Overall)
Medal record
Event	1st	2nd	3rd
Olympic Games	1	0	1
World Championships	3	1	8
World Team Championships	1	2	0
Winter Universiade	5	2	1
Asian Games	1	2	0
Total	11	7	11
Men's short track speed skating
Representing South Korea
Olympic Games
Gold medal – first place	1992 Albertville	5000 m relay
Bronze medal – third place	1992 Albertville	1000 m
Olympic Games (Demonstration)
Gold medal – first place	1988 Calgary	3000m
World Championships
Gold medal – first place	1990 Amsterdam	Overall
Gold medal – first place	1990 Amsterdam	3000 m
Gold medal – first place	1991 Sydney	1500 m
Silver medal – second place	1992 Denver	1000 m
Bronze medal – third place	1988 St. Louis	5000 m relay
Bronze medal – third place	1989 Solihull	5000 m relay
Bronze medal – third place	1990 Amsterdam	1500 m
Bronze medal – third place	1991 Sydney	Overall
Bronze medal – third place	1992 Denver	Overall
Bronze medal – third place	1992 Denver	500 m
Bronze medal – third place	1993 Beijing	1000 m
Bronze medal – third place	1995 Gjøvik	1500 m
World Team Championships
Gold medal – first place	1994 Cambridge	Team
Silver medal – second place	1991 Seoul	Team
Silver medal – second place	1995 Zoetermeer	Team
Winter Universiade
Gold medal – first place	1989 Sofia	500 m
Gold medal – first place	1989 Sofia	5000 m relay
Gold medal – first place	1993 Zakopane	1000 m
Gold medal – first place	1993 Zakopane	1500 m
Gold medal – first place	1993 Zakopane	3000 m
Silver medal – second place	1989 Sofia	1000 m
Silver medal – second place	1989 Sofia	3000 m
Bronze medal – third place	1993 Zakopane	500 m
Asian Winter Games
Gold medal – first place	1990 Sapporo	5000 m relay
Silver medal – second place	1990 Sapporo	1500 m
Silver medal – second place	1990 Sapporo	3000 m

Lee Joon-ho (Korean: 이준호; Hanja: 李準鎬, born 7 September 1965) is a South Korean short track speed skater. In 1990, he became the first Korean to win the Overall World Short Track Speed Skating Championships. Lee won a gold medal in 1992 Winter Olympics as a member of 5000m relay team. He also won an individual bronze medal in 1000m.
