= Richard Goerlitz =

Australian speed skater

Richard Goerlitz (born 2 August 1970) is a former Olympic ice speed skater from Australia.

Goerlitz represented Australia in short track Speed Skating at both the 1998 Winter Olympics and the 2002 Winter Olympics. He came 6th in the 1500m and placed 9th overall at the 1998 World Championships in Vienna, Austria. Goerlitz was also a National Champion, Australian International Record Holder and member of the national team for more than 10 years.

Goerlitz also briefly held the national long track speed skating records in the 500, 1,000 and 1,500 meters in an attempt to become the first Australian to represent Australia at the Winter Olympics in both long and short track Speed Skating.

Goerlitz also represented Australia at the 2006 World Sprint Speed Skating Championships in long track Speed Skating before retiring in 2010 from international competition.
