= Marc Bella =

French speed skater (born 1961)

Personal information
- Nationality: French
- Born: 7 October 1961 (age 65) Turin, Italy

Sport
- Sport: Short track speed skating

Marc Bella (born 7 October 1961) is a French short track speed skater. He competed in two events at the 1992 Winter Olympics.
