= Chris Nicholson (athlete) =

New Zealand cyclist and speed skater

Christopher John Nicholson (born 16 March 1967 in Bexleyheath, England) is a New Zealand sportsman who has represented the country at both the Winter Olympics as a short track speed skater and at the Summer Olympics as a cyclist. He competed at the 1992 Summer Olympic Games in Barcelona, the 1992 Winter Olympic Games in Albertville, and the 1994 Winter Olympic Games in Lillehammer. The only other New Zealander to compete at both the Summer and Winter Olympics is Madonna Harris.

Nicholson was the New Zealand flag bearer at the opening ceremony of the 1992 Winter Olympics, and is a brother of speed skater Andrew Nicholson.

In 1990, Nicholson was awarded the New Zealand 1990 Commemoration Medal.
