= Richard Nizielski =

Short track speed skater

Olympic medal record

Men's Short track speed skating

Representing Australia
Bronze medal – third place	1994 Lillehammer	5000 m relay

Richard Nizielski (born 27 July 1968) is an Australian short track speed skater who competed in the 1992 Winter Olympics, in the 1994 Winter Olympics, and in the 1998 Winter Olympics.

== Early life ==
He was born in Nottingham, Great Britain. He immigrated to Australia with his father Jerzy and mother Anne. They sailed on the Australis and arrived on 23 June 1971, in Perth. They settled in the suburb of Maylands, Western Australia.

== Skating ==
In 1991, Nizielski was part of the Australian quartet that won the 5,000 m relay at the World Championships in 1991 in Sydney. It was the first time that Australia had won a World Championship in a winter sport.

Australia's short track relay team went into the 1992 Olympics as world champions, but the team crashed in the semi-finals. The Australians were in third place when Nizielski lost his footing; they finished fourth and failed to reach the final. Nizielski competed in the individual 1,000 m event, but was eliminated in the first round, placing 21st out of 27 competitors.

In 1994, Nizielski was part of the short track relay team won Australia's first Winter Olympic medal, a bronze. They scraped into the four-team final after edging out Japan and New Zealand to finish second in their semi-final. They adopted a plan of staying on their feet as first priority, and remaining undisqualified and beating at least one of the other three finalists. During the race, the Canadians fell and lost significant time, meaning that Australia would win their first medal if they raced conservatively and avoided a crash. Late in the race, Nizielski was fighting with his American counterpart for track position for the silver medal, but took the safe option and yielded, mindful of the lost opportunity following the crash in Albertville. Nizielski recollected "At the last change [American] Eric Flaim got a good push-away and he stepped underneath my feet and stopped me. I thought, well I'm not going to fight him for this. I didn't want to let the team down. And I was very aware that I had taken a fall in Albertville. I just wanted to get through and get the medal." Thus Steven Bradbury, Nizielski, Andrew Murtha and Kieran Hansen became Australia's first Winter Olympics medallists.

Nizielski was also entered in the 500 m and 1,000 m individual events. In the first event, he won his heat in a time of 44.86 s and then came fourth in his quarterfinal in a slower time of 45.57 s to be eliminated. He was classified tenth overall out of 31 competitors. In the 1,000 m event, Nizielski came second in his heat in a time of 1 m 32.42 s. He came fourth in his quarterfinal in a time of 1 m 29.93 s and was eliminated. He came 13th out of 31 competitors.

Bradbury, Nizielski and Kieran Hansen, three of the quartet that won Australia's maiden medal in 1994 returned with new teammate Richard Goerlitz, and there were hopes that they could repeat their Lillehammer performance. However, in their qualifying race, they placed third in a time of 7 m 11.691 s and missed the final by one place, even though they had been two seconds faster than their medal-winning performance in 1994. They completed the course four seconds slower in the B final and came last in the race, and thus last out of eight teams overall. Nizielski did not compete in the individual events.

Nizielski was Australia's flag bearer at the opening ceremony of the 1998 Nagano Winter Olympics.

== Honours ==
Based in Western Australia at the Western Australian Institute of Sport, Nizielski was named the Athlete of the Year for 1993–94. He was the first Western Australian to compete at the Winter Olympics.

== Post sporting career ==
In retirement Nizielski went into the theatre industry. He works for Way Out Theatreworks, an award-winning company in Brisbane. According to their website, Nizielski is a "trained Fight Director. He has performed in tv, commercials and corporate entertainment. Richard is a trainer at The Actors Conservatory". Nizielski also became a golf instructor and writes articles about biomechanical and sporting posture for golf magazines. He remains involved in helping to mentor the next generation of Australian speed skaters.
