= World Short Track Speed Skating Team Championships =

Speed skating championship

The World Short Track Speed Skating Team Championships were a professional team short track speed skating event. They were held once a year in a different country.

The top eight countries from the ISU Short Track Speed Skating World Cup qualified automatically. Four skaters from each country raced in the 500 meter, and 1000 meters, two skaters from each country race in the 3000 meters and there was a team effort in the 3000 meters relay, for women, and the 5000 meters relay for men. Eight countries are divided into two brackets, and do races. Countries with a first placed skater got 5 points, and 3 points, 2 points, 1 points respectively, the sum of each skater for the races determined the rank. The first placed countries qualified for Final A, last placed country qualified for Final B. Repechage were held for the remaining two qualified countries for Final A.

The Championships was first held in 1991 and was discontinued until further notice by ISU after the 2011 season.

== Past results ==
=== Men's ===
Year	Host	Gold	Silver	Bronze
1991	Seoul	Japan	South Korea	Canada
1992	Minamimaki	South Korea	Italy	Japan
1993	Budapest	Italy	Canada	South Korea
1994	Cambridge	South Korea	Canada	Italy
1995	Zoetermeer	Canada	South Korea	United States
1996	Lake Placid	Canada	South Korea	Italy
1997	Seoul	South Korea	Japan	Italy
1998	Bormio	Canada	South Korea	Italy
1999	St. Louis	China	Canada	Japan
2000	The Hague	Canada	South Korea	Italy
2001	Minamimaki	Canada	China	South Korea
2002	Milwaukee	China	Canada	South Korea
2003	Sofia	Canada	South Korea	China
2004	Saint Petersburg	South Korea	Canada	Italy
2005	Chuncheon	Canada	South Korea	China
2006	Montreal	South Korea	Canada	China
2007	Budapest	Canada	South Korea	Italy
2008	Harbin	United States	Canada	South Korea
2009	Heerenveen	South Korea	Canada	United States
2010	Bormio	South Korea	Canada	China
2011	Warsaw	South Korea	China	Canada

=== Women's ===
Year	Host	Gold	Silver	Bronze
1991	Seoul	Canada	China	Netherlands
1992	Minamimaki	South Korea	Japan	China
1993	Budapest	Italy	South Korea	Russia
1994	Cambridge	Canada	South Korea	Italy
1995	Zoetermeer	South Korea	China	Canada
1996	Lake Placid	South Korea	Italy	United States
1997	Seoul	South Korea	Canada	Japan
1998	Bormio	China	South Korea	Canada
1999	St. Louis	China	Canada	South Korea
2000	The Hague	China	South Korea	Japan
2001	Minamimaki	China	South Korea	Canada
2002	Milwaukee	South Korea	China	Canada
2003	Sofia	South Korea	China	Italy
2004	Saint Petersburg	South Korea	China	Italy
2005	Chuncheon	South Korea	China	Canada
2006	Montreal	South Korea	China	Canada
2007	Budapest	South Korea	China	Canada
2008	Harbin	China	South Korea	Canada
2009	Heerenveen	China	South Korea	United States
2010	Bormio	South Korea	Canada	Italy
2011	Warsaw	South Korea	China	United States

== Medals (1991-2011) ==
Rank	Nation	Gold	Silver	Bronze	Total
1	South Korea	20	15	5	40
2	Canada	10	11	10	31
3	China	8	11	5	24
4	Italy	2	3	11	16
5	Japan	1	2	4	7
6	United States	1	0	5	6
7	Netherlands	0	0	1	1
7	Russia	0	0	1	1
Totals (8 entries)		42	42	42	126
