= List of Australian Winter Olympians =

A list of Australian Winter Olympians.

== A ==
- Chris Allan: Cross-country skiing (1984)
- Mitchell Allan: Snowboard (2006)
- Jenny Altermatt: Alpine (1980)
- Bob Arnott: Alpine (1952)
- Tony Aslangal: Alpine (1956)

== B ==
- Adam Barclay: Bobsleigh
- Aaron Bear: Alpine
- Dale Begg-Smith: Freestyle skier (moguls)
- Jason Begg-Smith: Freestyle (moguls) (2006)
- Manuela Berchtold: Freestyle (Moguls)
- Richard Biggins: Alpine (1988)
- Colleen Bolton: Cross-country skiing (1980)
- Tatiana Borodulina: Short track (2010)
- Esther Bottomley: Cross-country skiing (2006)
- Mervyn Bower: Figure skating (1956, 1960)
- Shaun Boyle: Skeleton (2006)
- Steven Bradbury: Short track
- Craig Branch: Alpine
- Jonathon Brauer: Alpine (2006)
- Rowena Bright: Alpine
- Torah Bright: Snowboard
- Peter Brockhoff: Alpine (1960, 1964)
- Tracy Brook: Figure skating (1988)
- Simon Brown: Alpine (1964)
- Clare-Louise Brumley: Cross-country skiing (2006)
- Sharon Burley: Figure skating (1976)
- Andrew Burton: Snowboard

== C ==
- Elizabeth Cain: Figure skating (1980)
- Peter Cain: Figure skating (1980)
- Felicity Campbell: Short track (1992)
- Hannah Campbell-Pegg: Luge (2006)
- Alisa Camplin: Freestyle skier (aerials)
- Danielle Carr: Figure skating
- Stephen Carr: Figure skating
- Glenn Carroll: Bobsleigh (1994)
- Joanne Carter: Figure skating
- Bill Cherrell: Figure skating (1960)
- Rodney Clarke: Figure skating (1988)
- Nick Cleaver: Freestyle (moguls) (1992, 1994)
- Kim Clifford: Alpine (1976, 1980)
- Steven Clifford: Alpine (1972)
- Stephen Craig: Bobsleigh (1988)
- Colin Coates: Long track (1968, 1972, 1976, 1980, 1984, 1988)
- Jacqui Cooper: Freestyle (aerials)
- Adrian Costa: Freestyle (moguls)
- Paul Costa: Freestyle (moguls)
- Jacqui Cowderoy: Alpine (1980)
- Holly Crawford: Snowboard

== D ==
- Janet Daly: Short track
- Christine Davy: Alpine (1956, 1960)
- Bill Day: Alpine (1952, 1956, 1960)
- Anthony Deane: Skeleton (2010)
- Maria Despas: Freestyle (moguls)
- Michael Dickson: Alpine
- Adrian DiPiazza: Bobsleigh (1988)
- Simon Dodd: Bobsleigh (1988)

== E ==
- Anthony Evans: Cross-country skiing

== F ==
- Nicholas Fisher: Freestyle (moguls) (2006)
- Judy Forras: Alpine (1964)
- Peter Forras: Alpine (1988)

== G ==
- Allan Ganter: Figure skating (1956)
- Elizabeth Gardner: Freestyle (aerials) (2006)
- Karen Gardiner: Short track (1992)
- Jason Giobbi: Bobsleigh
- Richard Goerlitz: Short track speed skating
- Mark Gray: Cross-country skiing
- Paul Gray: Cross-country skiing
- David Griff: Alpine (1976)
- Alistair Guss: Alpine (1984)
- Antony Guss: Alpine (1980)
- Marilla Guss: Alpine (1984)
- Daniel Guerin Speed ski 1992

== H ==
- Nancy Hallam: Figure skating (1952)
- Kieran Hansen: Short track (1992, 1994)
- Martin Harland: Bobsleigh (1988)
- Duncan Harvey: Bobsleigh (2010)
- Bruce Haslingden: Cross-country skiing (1952)
- Lachlan Hay: Short track (2006)
- Damon Hayler: Snowboard (2006)
- Chris Heberle: Cross-country skiing (1988)
- Joanne Henke: Alpine skiing (1976)
- Damon Hayler: Snowboard
- Colin Hickey: Long track (1952, 1956, 1960)
- Stephanie Hickey: Snowboard (2010)
- David Hislop: Cross-country skiing (1984, 1988)
- Melissa Hoar: Skeleton (2010)
- Vicki Holland: Figure skating (1984)
- Jarryd Hughes: Snowboard (2018)
- Anthony Huguet: Alpine (1994)
- Les Herstik Speed ski 1992

== I ==
- Lydia Ierodiaconou: Freestyle (aerials)

== J ==
- Scott James: Snowboard (2010)
- Alice Jones: Alpine
- Andy Jung: Short track speed skating (2018)

== K ==
- Danny Kah: Long track (1988, 1992, 1994)
- John Kah: Short track (1992)
- Karen Kah: Short track (1994)
- Charles Keeble: Figure skating (1956)
- Kenneth Kennedy: Long track (1936)
- Scott Kneller: Freestyle skiing (2010)
- Jeannette Korten: Alpine

== L ==
- Cheltzie Lee: Figure skating (2010)
- Stephen Lee: Short track (2002, 2006)
- Steven Lee: Alpine (1984, 1988, 1992)
- Emma Lincoln-Smith: Skeleton (2010)
- Anthony Liu: Figure skating
- Astrid Loch-Wilkinson: Bobsleigh (2006)
- Jim Lynch: Long track (1972)

== M ==
- Monica MacDonald: Figure skating (1988)
- Kirstie Marshall: Freestyle (aerials)
- Ross Martin: Cross-country skiing (1968)
- Bob Mongoloid: Freestyle (aerials) (1984)
- Jacqueline Mason: Figure skating (1956, 1960)
- Ben Mates: Snowboard (2006)
- Justin McDonald: Bobsleigh (1994)
- Frederick J McEvoy: Australian competitor for Britain in bobsleigh (1936)
- Alex McEwan: Short track speed skating
- Ondine McGlashan: Alpine (1984)
- Cecilia McIntosh: Bobsleigh (2010)
- Rob McIntyre: Alpine (1976, 1980)
- Shane McKenzie: Bobsleigh (2006)
- Andrew McNee: Short track speed skating
- Mark McNee: Short track speed skating
- Cameron Medhurst: Figure skating (1984, 1988, 1992)
- Malcolm Milne: Alpine (1968, 1972)
- Ross Milne: Died in training for 1964 Winter Olympics (alpine)
- Gweneth Molony: Figure skating (1952)
- Cameron Morton: Biathlon (2006)
- David Morris: Freestyle-aerials (2010)
- Sophie Muir: Short track (2010)
- Andrew Murtha: Short track (1992, 1994)
- Paul Murray: Cross-country skiing (2006, 2010)

== N ==
- Paul Narracott: Bobsleigh (1992) (also competed in 1984 Summer Olympics)
- Hal Nerdal: Nordic combined (1960)
- Kathrin Nikolussi: Alpine
- Richard Nizielski: Short track (1992, 1994)

== O ==
- Diane Ogle: Luge (1992)
- Emanuel Oppliger: Snowboard (2006)
- Jenny Owens: Alpine

== P ==
- Sandra Paintin-Paul (also Sandra Paintin): Biathlon (1992, 1994)
- Barry Patten: Alpine (1952)
- Andrew Paul: Biathlon (1984, 1988)
- Trennon Paynter: Moguls
- Frank Prihoda: Alpine (1956)
- Ted Polgaze: Bobsleigh
- Duncan Pugh: Bobsleigh (2010)
- Alex Pullin: Snowboard(2010)

== R ==
- Kylie Reed: Bobsleigh (2006)
- Lachlan Reidy: Bobsleigh (2018)
- Michael Richmond: Long track (1980, 1984, 1988)
- Kerryn Rim (also Kerryn Pethybridge): Biathlon
- Michael Robertson: Freestyle (moguls) (2006)
- Sally Rodd: Alpine (1976)
- Jeremy Rolleston: Bobsleigh (2006, 2010)
- Emily Rosemond: Short track (2006)
- Anthony Ryan: Bobsleigh (2010)

== S ==
- William Schober: Figure skating (1976)
- Jane Sexton: Moguls
- Aileen Shaw: Figure skating (1960)
- Johanna Shaw: Snowboard (2006)
- Elliott Shriane: Short track (2006)
- Ben Sim: Cross-country skiing (2010)
- Cedric Sloane: Cross-country skiing (1952)
- Christine Smith: Alpine (1964)
- Tim Spencer: Figure skating (1960)
- Christopher Spring: Bobsleigh (2010)
- Michelle Steele: Skeleton (2006)
- Zali Steggall: Alpine
- Zeke Steggall: Snowboard
- Angus Stuart: Bobsleigh (1988)
- Adrian Swan: Figure skating (1952)
- Jono Sweet: Freestyle (aerials)(1998)

== T ==
- Phillip Tahmindjis: Long track (1988, 1992, 1994)
- Emily Thomas: Snowboard (2006)
- Glenn Turner: Bobsleigh (1992)
- Roy Tutty: Long track (1960)

== W ==
- James Walker: Alpine (1956)
- Scott Walker: Bobsleigh
- Bradley Wall: Alpine
- Richard Walpole: Cross-country skiing
- Peter Wenzel: Alpine (1964)
- Roger White: Luge
- Mary Wilson: Figure skating (1960)

== Z ==
- Stephanie Zhang: Figure skating

== See also ==
- Australia at the Winter Olympics
