= Australia at the 1998 Winter Olympics =

- IOC code: AUS
- NOC: Australian Olympic Committee
- Website: www.olympics.com.au

in Nagano
- Competitors: 23 in 8 sports
- Flag bearer: Richard Nizielski
- Medals Ranked 22nd: Gold 0 Silver 0 Bronze 1 Total 1

Winter Olympics appearances (overview)
- 1936; 1948; 1952; 1956; 1960; 1964; 1968; 1972; 1976; 1980; 1984; 1988; 1992; 1994; 1998; 2002; 2006; 2010; 2014; 2018; 2022; 2026

Australia was represented at the 1998 Winter Olympics in Nagano, Japan by the Australian Olympic Committee.

In total, 23 athletes including 15 men and eight women represented Australia in eight different sports including alpine skiing, biathlon, cross-country skiing, figure skating, freestyle skiing, short track speed skating and snowboarding.

Australia won one medal at the games after Zali Steggall claimed bronze in the alpine skiing women's slalom.

== Competitors ==
In total, 23 athletes represented Australia at the 1998 Winter Olympics in Nagano, Japan across eight different sports.

Sport	Men	Women	Total
Alpine skiing	0	1	1
Biathlon	0	1	1
Bobsleigh	4	–	4
Cross-country skiing	2	0	2
Figure skating	2	2	4
Freestyle skiing	2	3	5
Short track speed skating	4	1	5
Snowboarding	1	0	1
Total	15	8	23

== Medalists ==
Australia won one medal at the games after Zali Steggall claimed bronze in the alpine skiing women's slalom.

Medal	Name	Sport	Event
Bronze	Zali Steggall	Alpine skiing	Women's slalom

== Alpine skiing ==
In total, one Australian athlete participated in the alpine skiing events – Zali Steggall in the women's slalom.

Athlete	Event	Run 1 (DH)		Run 2 (Sl)		Run 3 (Sl)		Final/Total		
Athlete	Event	Time	Rank	Time	Rank	Time	Rank	Time	Diff	Rank
Zali Steggall	Slalom	45.96	3	46.71	4	—N/a		1:32.67	+0.27	3rd place, bronze medalist(s)

== Biathlon ==
In total, one Australian athlete participated in the biathlon events – Kerryn Rim in the women's individual and the women's sprint.

Athlete	Event	Final		
Athlete	Event	Time	Misses	Rank
Kerryn Rim	Individual	1:01:38.1	4	43
Kerryn Rim	Sprint	25:49.1	2	47

== Bobsleigh ==
In total, four Australian athletes participated in the bobsleigh events – Adam Barclay, Jason Giobbi, Ted Polglaze and Scott Walker.

Athlete	Event	Final					
Athlete	Event	Run 1	Run 2	Run 3	Run 4	Total	Rank
Jason Giobbi; Adam Barclay	Two-man	55.56	55.47	55.26	55.31	3:41.60	22
Jason Giobbi; Scott Walker; Ted Polglaze; Adam Barclay	Four-man	54.72	54.93	55.23	—N/a	2:44.88	23

== Cross-country skiing ==
In total, two Australian athletes participated in the cross-country skiing events – Anthony Evans and Paul Gray.

Athlete	Event	Race	
Athlete	Event	Time	Rank
Anthony Evans	10 km classical	31:12.7	66
Anthony Evans	15 km freestyle pursuit	47:43.4	55
Anthony Evans	30 km classical	1:45:26.3	51
Anthony Evans	50 km freestyle	2:21:44.4	48
Paul Gray	10 km classical	34:45.1	88
Paul Gray	15 km freestyle pursuit	did not finish	
Paul Gray	50 km freestyle	2:29:08.2	59

== Figure skating ==
In total, four Australian athletes participated in the figure skating events – Danielle Carr and Stephen Carr in the pairs, Joanne Carter in the women's singles and Anthony Liu in the men's singles.

Athlete(s)	Event	CD1	CD2	SP/OD	FS/FD	Total	
Athlete(s)	Event	FP	FP	FP	FP	TFP	Rank
Anthony Liu	Men's	—N/a		25	did not advance		
Joanne Carter	Ladies'	—N/a		11	12	17.5	12
Danielle Carr; Stephen Carr	Pairs	—N/a		15	13	20.5	13

== Freestyle skiing ==
In total, five Australian athletes participated in the freestyle skiing events – Jacqui Cooper and Kirstie Marshall in the women's aerials, Adrian Costa in the men's moguls, Maria Despas in the women's moguls and Jonathan Sweet in the men's aerials.

Athlete	Event	Qualifying		Final	
Athlete	Event	Points	Rank	Points	Rank
Adrian Costa	Men's moguls	23.45	21	did not advance	
Jonathan Sweet	Men's aerials	did not finish			
Maria Despas	Women's moguls	18.94	23	did not advance	
Jacqui Cooper	Women's aerials	101.19	23	did not advance	
Kirstie Marshall	Women's aerials	148.99	14	did not advance	

== Short track speed skating ==
In total, five Australian athletes participated in the short track speed skating events – Steven Bradbury, Janet Daly, Richard Goerlitz, Kieran Hansen and Richard Nizielski.

Athlete	Event	Heat		Quarterfinal		Semifinal		Final	
Athlete	Event	Time	Rank	Time	Rank	Time	Rank	Time	Rank
Steven Bradbury	Men's 500 m	43.766	3	did not advance					19
Steven Bradbury	Men's 1,000 m	1:33.108	3	did not advance					21
Steven Bradbury; Richard Goerlitz; Kieran Hansen; Richard Nizielski	Men's 5,000 m relay	—N/a				7:11.691	3 QB	B Final; 7:15.907	8
Janet Daly	Women's 500 m	49.158	4	did not advance					27
Janet Daly	Women's 1,000 m	1:59.990	4	did not advance					29

== Snowboarding ==
In total, one Australian athlete participated in the snowboarding events – Zeke Steggall in the men's giant slalom.

Athlete	Event	Run 1		Run 2		Total	
Athlete	Event	Time	Rank	Time	Rank	Time	Rank
Zeke Steggall	Men's giant slalom	1:08.10	27	did not finish			
