= Australia at the 2010 Winter Olympics =

- IOC code: AUS
- NOC: Australian Olympic Committee
- Website: www.olympics.com.au

in Vancouver
- Competitors: 40 in 11 sports
- Flag bearers: Torah Bright (opening); Lydia Lassila (closing)
- Medals Ranked 13th: Gold 2 Silver 1 Bronze 0 Total 3

Winter Olympics appearances (overview)
- 1936; 1948; 1952; 1956; 1960; 1964; 1968; 1972; 1976; 1980; 1984; 1988; 1992; 1994; 1998; 2002; 2006; 2010; 2014; 2018; 2022; 2026

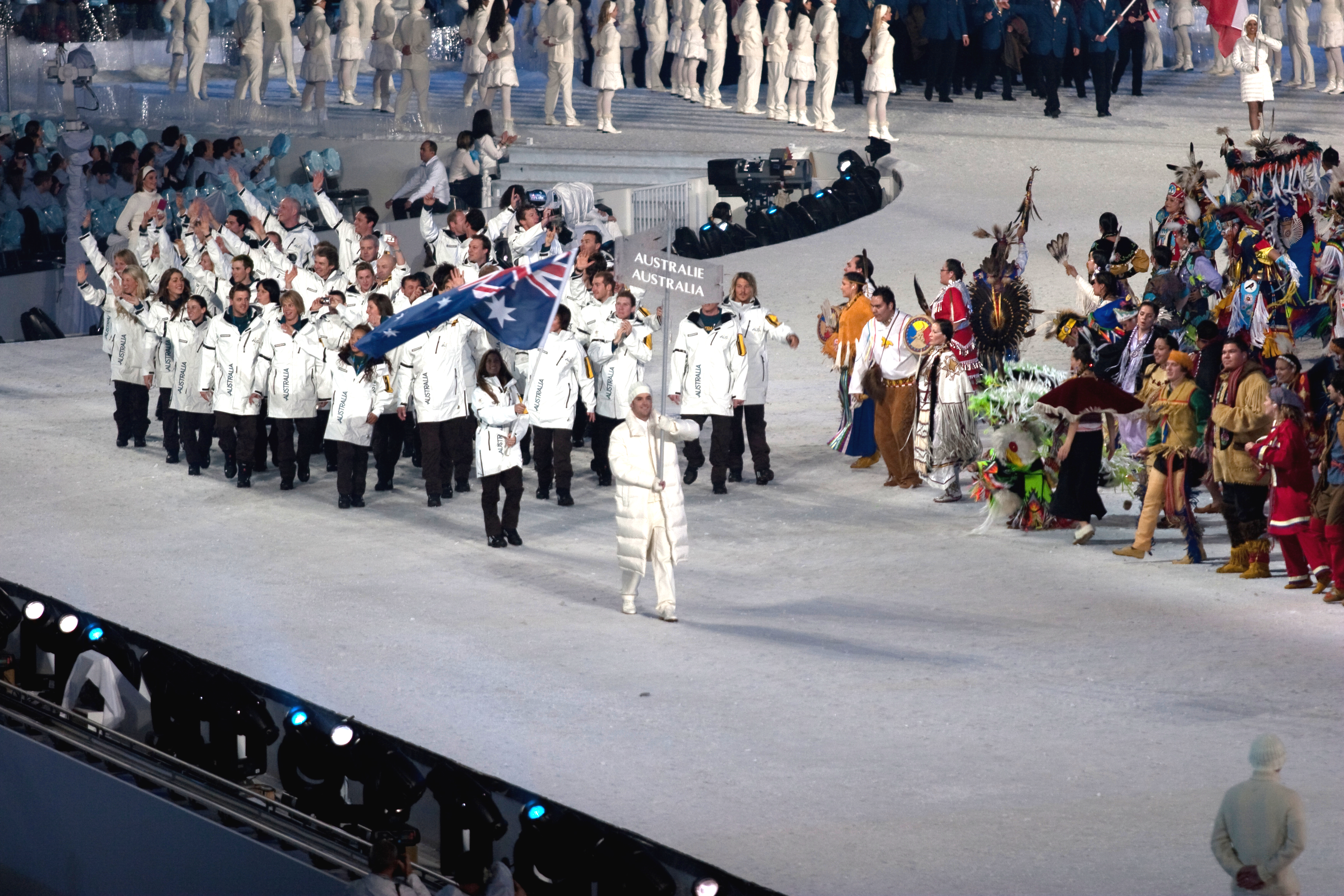
The athletes entering the stadium during the opening ceremonies.

Australia participated at the 2010 Winter Olympics in Vancouver, British Columbia, Canada. A team of forty athletes was selected to compete in eleven sports. The Chef de Mission was Ian Chesterman who has held the position since the 1998 Winter Olympics.

Australia achieved its at the time best ever results, winning two gold medals; in the women's aerials (Lydia Lassila) and women's snowboard halfpipe (Torah Bright); and a silver in the men's moguls. This would later be surpassed in the 2026 Olympics.

== Medalists ==
Medal	Name	Sport	Event	Date
Gold	Torah Bright	Snowboarding	Women's halfpipe	18 February
Gold	Lydia Lassila	Freestyle skiing	Women's aerials	24 February
Silver	Dale Begg-Smith	Freestyle Skiing	Men's moguls	14 February

== Alpine skiing ==
Athlete	Event	Time	Rank
Craig Branch	Men's downhill	1:57.19	34
Craig Branch	Men's super-G	1:32:89	29
Jono Brauer	Men's downhill	1:58.08	39
Jono Brauer	Men's super-G	1:32:92	30

== Biathlon ==
Athlete	Event	Final		
Athlete	Event	Time	Misses	Rank
Alexei Almoukov	Men's sprint	30:57.9	4	87

== Bobsleigh ==
Athlete	Event	Final					
Athlete	Event	Run 1	Run 2	Run 3	Run 4	Time	Rank
Chris Spring; Duncan Harvey (heats 1 and 2); Anthony Ryan (heat 3)	Two-man	53.14	54.41	53.18	DNQ	2:40.73	22
Jeremy Rolleston; Duncan Pugh	Two-man	DNF	DNS				
Jeremy Rolleston; Duncan Pugh; Duncan Harvey; Anthony Ryan	Four-man	DNS					
Astrid Loch-Wilkinson; Cecilia Mcintosh	Two-woman	54.85	54.66	55.16	DNQ	2:44.67	19

== Cross-country skiing ==
Athlete	Event	Qualification		Quarterfinals		Semifinals		Final	
Athlete	Event	Time	Rank	Time	Rank	Time	Rank	Time	Rank
Esther Bottomley	Women's sprint	4:05.12	50	Did not advance					50
Paul Murray	Men's sprint	3:52.96	55	Did not advance					55
Ben Sim	15 km freestyle	N/A						35:48.6	45
Ben Sim	30 km pursuit	N/A						1:23:25.8	47
Paul Murray; Ben Sim	Men's team sprint	19:57.0	10	N/A				Did not advance	20

== Figure skating ==
Athlete(s)	Event	CD		SP/OD		FS/FD		Total	
Athlete(s)	Event	Points	Rank	Points	Rank	Points	Rank	Points	Rank
Cheltzie Lee	Ladies'	N/A		52.16	18	86.00	20	138.16	20

== Freestyle skiing ==
Men's team – aerials and moguls

Athlete	Event	Qualifying		Final	
Athlete	Event	Points 663	Rank	Points	Rank
Dale Begg-Smith	Moguls	25.03	4 Q	26.58	Silver medal
Ramone Cooper	Moguls	21.11	27	Did not advance	
David Morris	Aerials	221.02	13	Did not advance	

Men's team – ski cross

Athlete	Event	Qualifying		1/8 final	Quarterfinal	Semifinal	Final	
Athlete	Event	Time	Rank	Rank	Rank	Rank	Final	Rank
Scott Kneller	Ski cross	1:13.85	12 Q	2 Q	2 Q	3 q	Small Final; 3	7

Women's team – aerials and moguls

Athlete	Event	Qualifying		Final	
Athlete	Event	Points	Rank	Points	Rank
Britteny Cox	Moguls	19.87	23	Did not advance	
Jacqui Cooper	Aerials	162.99	11 Q	194.29	5
Elizabeth Gardner	Aerials	164.60	10 Q	86.70	12
Lydia Lassila	Aerials	167.55	9 Q	214.74	Gold medal
Bree Munro	Aerials	143.46	18	Did not advance	

Women's team – ski cross

Athlete	Event	Qualifying		1/8 final	Quarterfinal	Semifinal	Final	
Athlete	Event	Time	Rank	Rank	Rank	Rank	Final	Rank
Katya Crema	Ski cross	1:20.19	17 Q	2 Q	3	Did not advance		15
Jenny Owens	Ski cross	1:19.80	15 Q	2 Q	3	Did not advance		13

== Luge ==
Athlete	Event	Finals					
Athlete	Event	Run 1	Run 2	Run 3	Run 4	Time	Rank
Hannah Campbell-Pegg	Women's singles	42.527	42.570	42.606	42.519	2:50.222	23

== Short track speed skating ==
Athlete	Event	Heat		Quarterfinal		Semifinal		Final		Ranking
Athlete	Event	Time	Rank	Time	Rank	Time	Rank	Time	Rank	Ranking
Tatiana Borodulina	Women's 500 metres	44.901	3	did not advance						21
Tatiana Borodulina	Women's 1000 metres	1:32.509	1 Q	1:32.465	2 Q	1:29.663	3 QB	Final B 1:32.661	4	7
Tatiana Borodulina	Women's 1500 metres	2:27:408	2 Q	N/A		2:21.617	4 QB	Final B 2:43.051	3	11
Lachlan Hay	Men's 1000 metres	1:26.132	4	Did not advance						26

== Skeleton ==
Athlete	Event	Final					
Athlete	Event	Run 1	Run 2	Run 3	Run 4	Total	Rank
Anthony Deane	Men's	54.55	54.12	54.68	DNQ	2:43.45	23
Melissa Hoar	Women's	54.73	54.48	54.48	54.53	3:38.22	12
Emma Lincoln-Smith	Women's	54.28	54.41	54.54	54.40	3:37.63	10

== Snowboarding ==
Halfpipe

Athlete	Event	Qualification			Semifinals			Finals		
Athlete	Event	Run 1	Run 2	Rank	Run 1	Run 2	Rank	Run 1	Run 2	Rank
Torah Bright	Women's	41.3	45.8	1 QF	Bye			5.9	45.0	1st place, gold medalist(s)
Holly Crawford	Women's	38.6	39.5	7 QS	17.3	41.7	1 QF	23.9	30.3	8
Scott James	Men's	7.6	28.2	12	Did not advance					
Ben Mates	Men's	28.3	29.6	9 QS	3.6	27.5	11	Did not advance		

Parallel giant slalom

Athlete	Event	Qualification		Round of 16	Quarterfinals	Semifinals	Finals	
Athlete	Event	Time	Rank	Opposition Time	Opposition Time	Opposition Time	Opposition Time	Rank
Johanna Shaw	Women's	1:26:10	19	Did not advance				19

Snowboard cross

Athlete	Event	Qualification		1/8 finals	Quarterfinals	Semifinals	Finals
Athlete	Event	Time	Rank	Rank	Rank	Rank	Rank
Damon Hayler	Men's	1.21.81	9	2 Q	4	Did not advance	10
Stephanie Hickey	Women's	1:35.26	18	Did not advance			18
Alex Pullin	Men's	1.20.15	1	3	Did not advance		17

== Speed skating ==
Athlete	Event	Race 1		Race 2		Final	
Athlete	Event	Time	Rank	Time	Rank	Time	Rank
Sophie Muir	Women's 500 metres	39.649	31	39.400	27	1:19.04	29
Sophie Muir	Women's 1000 metres	N/A				1:18.79	30

== See also ==
- Australia at the 2010 Winter Paralympics
