= Anthony Ryan =

Anthony Ryan may refer to:

- Anthony Ryan (bobsleigh) (born 1980), Australian bobsledder
- Anthony Ryan (Treasury official), United States banker
- Anthony Ryan (writer) (born 1970), British fantasy writer
- Anthony Ryan (philanthropist), Australian philanthropist
- Tony Ryan (1936–2007), co-founder of Ryanair
- Tony Ryan (scientist) (born 1962), polymer chemist and broadcaster

== See also ==
- Ryan Anthony (1969–2020), American trumpet player
