= Astrid Radjenovic =

Australian bobsledder

Astrid Loch-Wilkinson
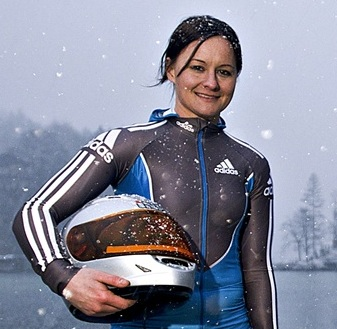
- Astrid (Loch-Wilkinson) Radjenovic, 11 January 2013, in Königssee.

Personal information
- Born: 14 September 1982 (age 44) Sydney, New South Wales, Australia
- Education: University of Sydney
- Occupation: Veterinarian
- Years active: 2003-2014
- Height: 168 cm (5 ft 6 in) (2014)
- Weight: 60 kg (132 lb) (2014)

Sport
- Country: Australia
- Sport: Bobsleigh
- Event: Two Woman Bobsleigh
- Coached by: Will Alstergren
- Retired: 2014
Medal record
	Two-Women's Bobsleigh
	Australia
2005-2006 Europa Cup
Silver medal – second place	Igls – 27 November
2009-2010 America's Cup
Silver medal – second place	Park City – 1 December
Bronze medal – third place	Park City – 2 December
Silver medal – second place	Park City – 3 December
Silver medal – second place	Lake Placid – 18 December
2010-2011 Europa Cup
Bronze medal – third place	St. Moritz – 21 January
- Updated on 6 February 2014

Astrid Loch-Wilkinson (born 14 September 1982), also known as Astrid Radjenovic, is an Australian veterinarian and athlete best known for piloting the Australian bobsleigh in the 2006, 2010, and 2014 Winter Olympics. Australia entered its first women's bobsleigh team into the FIBT World Championships with the team of Loch-Wilkinson and brake-woman Brigitte Egan in the 2004-2005 competition. In 2006, Loch-Wilkinson and brake-woman Kylie Reed represented Australia as the first women's bobsleigh team for the nation at the Winter Olympics.

In 1999 and 2000 she competed in various track and field running events, earning both a bronze and a silver in the 400 metres hurdles in the Australian Athletics Championships.

While a student at the University of Sydney, she played soccer, continuing the sport later as a member of the Sunshine Coast FC and Port Darwin FC women's teams.

Following the 2006 Winter Olympics, she competed in the 2006 Australian national weightlifting titles, earning a bronze in the 69 kg division.

== Background ==
She grew up in Sydney and was educated at Abbotsleigh, Wahroonga and the University of Sydney, where she qualified in veterinary science, graduating in 2006. Loch-Wilkinson was a national finalist in 400 metres hurdles. She took up bobsleigh at the suggestion of Hannah Campbell-Pegg, Australia's first Olympic woman luge competitor.

Loch-Wilkinson is a dual-citizen of both Australia and Sweden.

== Bobsleigh ==
Loch-Wilkinson took up bobsleigh racing in 2003 and initially financed her own entry into competition each season.

=== 2003-2004 season ===
In the 2003-2004 Europa Cup, she and brake-woman Kylie Reed finished 9th in the opening event, the best of the three two-woman bobsleigh teams Australia entered into the event.

=== 2004-2005 season ===
Loch-Wilkinson and brake-woman Kylie Reed secured 5th place at the opening 2004-2005 Europa Cup race in Igls. The pair finished 4th at Königssee in December 2004.

When they debuted on the World Cup circuit as a team in the 2004–2005 season, Loch-Wilkinson and Reed achieved Australia's first top 20 result in the World Cup with a ranking of 19th at Igls on 10 December with a time of 1:50.11. (Note: The official standings list the location as Nagano, not Igls.) Competing at Cesana Pariol on 21 January with brake-woman Danielle Lynch, Loch-Wilkinson ranked 22nd with a time of 1:01.05. The pair ranked 17th at St. Moritz on 28 January with a time of 2:22.24.

==== 2005 FIBT World Championships ====
With brake-woman Brigitte Egan, Loch-Wilkinson finished 23rd at the 2005 FIBT World Championships in the two-woman event at Calgary, finishing with a total time of 2:52.36. Loch-Wilkinson and Egan were the first women's bobsleigh team to compete in the event for Australia. Loch-Wilkinson finished the 2004–2005 season with an Olympic-adjusted ranking of 17th.

=== 2005-2006 season ===
During the 2005-2006 Europa Cup, Loch-Wilkinson and brake-woman Reed won the first medal for the Australian bobsleigh team at the opening track in Igls with a time of 1:50.96, securing a silver for the 27 November run.

Loch-Wilkinson and brake-woman Reed finished 19th in the first event of the 2005-2006 World Cup in Calgary with a time of 1:56.04. On 18 November at Lake Placid, the pair finished 19th with a time of 1:58.81. (Note: The same time and rank are recorded for the Intercontinental Cup taking place on the same date at the same location.) On 9 December at Igls, Loch-Wilkinson and Reed placed 18th with a time of 1:51.27. (Note: The official standings list the location as Nagano, not Igls.) At Cortina d'Ampezzo on 16 December the pair placed 18th with a time of 1:52.18. On 13 January at Königssee, they placed 17th with a time of 1:44.49, securing a slot in the 2006 Winter Olympics at Turin. On 20 January in St. Moritz, the duo placed 14th with a time of 2:20.02.

==== 2006 Winter Olympics ====
Loch-Wilkinson and brake-woman Reed earned a finish of 14th in the two-woman event at the 2006 Winter Olympics in Turin with a time of 3:55.11. (Note: The official standings on the IBSF website state that the competition took place at Cesana Pariol, which was the location used for bobsleigh, luge, and skeleton.) They were the first women's bobsleigh representatives at the Olympics for Australia. After Turin, Reed retired and Loch-Wilkinson did not compete the following season because of the high costs involved. She had competed in the 2006 Winter Olympics through the support of the NSWIS Campaign's Individual Scholarship Program.

=== 2009-2010 season ===
In the America's Cup on 1 December, Loch-Wilkinson and brake-woman Cecilia McIntosh scored silver with a time of 1:43.57. They scored bronze on 2 December with a time of 1:44.92. On 3 December, they scored silver with a time of 1:43.78. All three races took place in Park City, Utah. They ranked 4th at Calgary on 11 December with a time of 1:59.87, and took silver at Lake Placid on 18 December with a time of 1:58.02. They competed in one race for the Europa Cup at Cesana Pariol, ranking 6th with a time of 1:58.98.

At the end of December 2009, Loch-Wilkinson ranked 33rd in the world. By the end of January 2010, Loch-Wilkinson ranked 22nd in the world.

==== 2010 Winter Olympics ====
Initially, the FIBT had stated that competitors would only need to rank in the top 40 to qualify for the 2010 Winter Olympics, but the number was dropped to 20 just before the end of the qualifying period, immediately removing Loch-Wilkinson and McIntosh from the competition. After an appeal to the Court of Arbitration for Sport which rested on the fact that without allowing them to compete there would be no representatives for Oceania, Loch-Wilkinson and McIntosh were allowed to compete in Vancouver. They placed 19th with a time of 2:44.67 (Note: The official standings on the IBSF website state that the competition took place at Whistler, which was the location used for bobsleigh, luge, and skeleton.) in an event marred by spectacular crashes by the Great Britain1 and Germany2 teams, as well as a near-miss for Loch-Wilkinson that resulted in her completing one run without her visor.

Following the Winter Olympics, Loch-Wilkinson was named Sunshine Coast Sport Star of the year alongside Natasha Harrison.

=== 2010-2011 season ===
After attracting corporate sponsor Avante IT, Loch-Wilkinson set about rebuilding a new team with better equipment and competed in Europe in 2010–2011. She competed in 11 races – 8 in the Europa Cup and 3 in the World Cup – in addition to the 2011 FIBT World Championships during the season. Her brake-women were Fiona Cullen, Jamie Hedge, Gemma Ryde, and Sascha Lahey.

==== 2010-2011 Europa Cup ====
On 18 November, Loch-Wilkinson and brake-woman Jamie Hedge finished 10th with a time of 1:51.01 at Igls. On 20 November at the same track, the pair placed 9th with a time of 1:50.75. On 24 November at Cesana Pariol, they placed 8th with a time of 1:59.55.

On 8 December at Winterberg Loch-Wilkinson and brake-woman Gemma Ryde placed 12th with a time of 2:00.01. The next day at the same track but with brake-woman Hedge, Loch-Wilkinson placed 12th with a time of 2:00.40. On 16 December at Altenberg, Loch-Wilkinson and brake-woman Ryde placed 7th with a time of 1:57.64.

On 21 January, Loch-Wilkinson and brake-woman Hedge won a bronze medal in at St. Moritz with a time of 2:22.20. The next day on the same track, the pair placed 5th with a time of 2:22.52.

==== 2010-2011 World Cup ====
In January 2011 Loch-Wilkinson and Hedge were readmitted to the elite World Cup Tour for the 2010–11 Bobsleigh World Cup. On 14 January they competed at Igls, ranking 16th with a time of 1:51.19. On 29 January they competed at St. Moritz, ranking 16th with a time of 2:18.48. On 2 February, they competed at Cesana Pariol, ranking 13th with a time of 1:55.89.

==== 2011 FIBT World Championships ====
At Königssee on 18 and 19 February, Loch-Wilkinson and brake-woman Fiona Cullen ranked 14th with a time of 3:29.47.

=== 2011-2012 season ===
Loch-Wilkinson competed in 12 races over the season – 4 in the Europa Cup and 8 in the World Cup – in addition to the 2012 FIBT World Championships.

==== 2011-2012 Europa Cup ====
On 17 November 2011, Loch-Wilkinson and brake-woman Jamie Hedge ranked 6th in the Europa Cup on the track at Igls with a time of 1:49.48. The pair placed 7th on the same track two days later, with a time of 1:49.81.

On 25 November Loch-Wilkinson and brake-woman Jaclyn Narracott tied for the 8th rank with Canada's driver Jennifer Ciochetti and brake-woman Kate Obrien, with a time of 1:44.59 at Königssee. The duo placed 7th the next day at Königssee with a time of 1:44.89.

==== 2011-2012 World Cup ====
In the 2011–12 Bobsleigh World Cup, Loch-Wilkinson and brake-woman Hedge placed 13th in the first race at Igls 2 on December with a time of 1:48.80. At the 9 December race in La Plagne, the duo placed 14th with a time of 2:04.63. At the 17 December race in Winterberg, the pair placed 16th with a time of 1:59.54.

At the 6 January race in Altenberg, Loch-Wilkinson and brake-woman Ebony Gorincu placed 9th with a time of 1:56.83. At the 13 January race in Königssee, the duo placed 10th with a time of 1:45.18. At the 20 January race in St. Moritz the pair again placed 10th with a time of 2:19.46.

At the 3 February race in Whistler, Loch-Wilkinson and brake-woman Hedge placed 10th with a time of 1:48.24. At the 10 February race in Calgary, the pair placed 13th with a time of 1:55.77.

At season's end, she was placed 11th overall in the World Cup rankings.

==== 2012 FIBT World Championships ====
At Lake Placid on 16–17 February, Loch-Wilkinson and brake-woman Gorincu placed 15th with a time of 3:54.37.

=== 2012-2013 season ===
At the end of the 2011–2012 season, Loch-Wilkinson's personal sponsor, Energy Watch, ended their arrangement. She issued a press statement explaining the need for funding, and later received notification from the Olympic Winter Institute of Australia that she would have a funding increase for the next season.

At the first race of the 2012–13 Bobsleigh World Cup on 9 November, Loch-Wilkinson and brake-woman Fiona Harrison ranked 15th at Lake Placid with a time of 1:56.66. On 17 November at Park City, the pair placed 14th with a time of 1:41.15. On 24 November at Whistler, they ranked 14th with a time of 1:51.21. On 8 December, the duo placed 15th at Winterberg with a time of 1:55.43. On 14 December, they placed 17th with a time of 2:05.90 at La Plagne.

In late December 2012 the team was joined by former world champion 400-metre hurdler, Jana Pittman, who knew Loch-Wilkinson previously from their time in track and field. With Pittman as brake-woman, they took 7th place in a field of 13 sleds on 4 January at Altenberg with a time of 1:58.34. On 11 January, the duo placed 14th at Königssee with a time of 1:44.66. On 18 January in Igls, they ranked 17th with a time of 1:50.42. On 15 February in Sochi, they ranked 15th with a time of 1:58.48.

Overall, Loch-Wilkinson ranked 18th in the 2012-2013 World Cup.

==== 2013 FIBT World Championships ====
In the 2013 World Championships in St Moritz, Loch-Wilkinson and Pittman ranked 16th with a time of 4:34.31.

=== 2013-2014 season ===
A public appeal was launched in Australia for sponsorships to buy a new sled and runners prior to the Sochi 2014 Games. Loch-Wilkinson had announced a goal of $80,000 and used crowd-funding site sportaroo.com in her fundraising effort. A fundraising event at the Castle Hill RSL Luxe Lounge in Castle Hill, NSW helped the team raise funds toward a new sled for the 2013–2014 season. The Icebirds were able to purchase a sled for around $60,000.

Loch-Wilkinson's 2013–2014 team included three brake-women: Jana Pittman, Ebony Gorincu, and Janina Strauts. Loch-Wilkinson competed in a total of 11 races – 3 in the North America Cup and 8 in the World Cup – in addition to the 2014 Winter Olympics.

==== 2013-2014 North America Cup ====
On 21 November Loch-Wilkinson and brake-woman Pittman ranked 6th with a time of 1:42.44 at Park City, Utah. On 22 November at the same track, Loch-Wilkinson and brake-woman Gorincu placed 9th with a time of 1:41.42. On 23 November still on the same track, Loch-Wilkinson and brake-woman Pittman placed 4th with a time of 1:40.23.

==== 2013-2014 World Cup ====
During the 2013–14 Bobsleigh World Cup Loch-Wilkinson and brake-woman Pittman placed 17th – dead last – at Calgary with a time of 1:54.94 on 30 November. On 6 December, back in Park City, they placed 14th with a time of 1:39.35. The next day at the same track, Loch-Wilkinson and brake-woman Gorincu placed 17th with a time of 1:40.92. At Lake Placid on 14 December, Loch-Wilkinson and Pittman finished 15th in a field of 20 sleds with a time of 1:55.59. On 5 January, they placed 20th in the race at Winterberg with a time of 1:58.86. On 11 January, they placed 12th at St. Mortiz with a time of 2:18.03. On 19 January, the duo placed 13th with a time of 1:47.84 at Igls. On 26 January, they ranked 14th at Königssee with a time of 1:46.18.

==== 2014 Winter Olympics ====
Loch-Wilkinson and brake-woman Pittman ultimately placed 14th at the 2014 Winter Olympics, with a time of 3:54.55. Loch-Wilkinson retired from the sport afterward.

Over the course of her time in bobsleigh, Loch-Wilkinson had trained and competed with 17 brake-women.

== Soccer ==
Loch-Wilkinson played as a striker for the University of Sydney. In September 2003, she played for the University of Sydney Women's Soccer Club Under 21 team, who lost to the University of New South Wales. She also played in the grand final of the 21 and over team, as many of the under 21 team filled in for injured players on the older team, who won their first NSW State League title. In 2004, she scored one of two goals in the University of Sydney team's shutout win against the Blacktown Districts, and the only goal in a shutout game against the Central Coast United.

She played for the Sunshine Coast Fire in its founding year, 2007. In 2009, Loch-Wilkinson was still a member of the women's team when they won a premiership. She was named women's player of the year in a ceremony on 24 October 2009.

During the 2008 premier league season, she played for the Port Darwin women's team as a midfielder. Going into round 10 of the Northern Zone Women's Premiers League, Port Darwin was in third, but 2 goals each by Loch-Wilkinson and teammate Niki Cotis moved them into second in round 11.

== Track and field ==
In the youth track and field championships held in Perth 25–28 March 1999, Lock-Wilkinson competed in the under 18 women's 400 metres, finishing with a time of 59.64.

Loch-Wilkinson competed in the 400 metres hurdles for the 1999-2000 Australia Junior track and field Australian Athletics Championships, taking bronze with a time of 64.56 in December 1999 and silver with the final in February 2000 and a time of 62.31.

On 25 February 2000, she competed in the 4 × 100 metres relay with the New South Wales team Sydney Pacific, achieving a time of 50.46.

== Weightlifting ==
After being encouraged by Australian bobsleigh coach Will Alstergren to increase her strength following the 2006 Winter Olympics, Loch-Wilkinson was named to the New South Wales weightlifting team for the national titles in September 2006. She won a bronze medal in the 69 kg division.

== Personal life ==
Following the 2010 Winter Olympics, Loch-Wilkinson married Vuk Rađenović, of the Serbian bobsleigh team. After the 2014 Sochi Olympic Games, and 4 years of marriage, Vuk had an affair with German Bobsledder Stefanie Szczurek, ultimately resulting in their divorce.

== Sources ==
- "Astrid leads team to a world cup chance". Caloundra Journal. 28 January 2011. p. 31. NewsBank 13872A9B57295DF8.
- "Astrid Radjenovic". Australian Olympic Committee. n.d.
- "Athletics: Australian All Schools Championships at SIAC, Sydney". The Sydney Morning Herald. No. 50632. 13 December 1999. p. 33. ISSN 0312-6315. ProQuest 2527576218.
- "Athletics: Australian Track & Field Championships at the Olympic Stadium, Homebush Bay". The Sydney Morning Herald. No. 50697. 28 February 2000. p. 33. ISSN 0312-6315. ProQuest 2674375825.
- "Aussie Ice Maidens receive podium finish in Switzerland with Sochi 2014 in their sights". Australian Bobsleigh & Skeleton Association. 24 February 2011 – via Trove.
- "Australia set to make Olympic skeleton and bobsleigh debut". Winter Sports. Olympic Winter Institute of Australia. 14 January 2006 – via Trove.
- "Australia's 2-woman bobsled team gets OK for Olympics after winning appeal before sports court". Guelph Mercury. 9 February 2010.
- "Australian women contest World Bobsleigh Championships in Calgary". Australian Olympic Committee. 28 February 2005.
- "Azzurri lose, - Wharfies - unstoppable". Sunday Territorian. 5 August 2008. p. 36. NewsBank 1225C23BC933B680.
- "Bobsleigh: Bob duo continue their progress toward the Games". Winter Sports. Olympic Winter Institute of Australia. 17 December 2005 – via Trove.
- "Bobsleigh international season preparation update". Winter Sports. Olympic Winter Institute of Australia. 8 October 2013 – via Trove.
- "Bobsleigh pair place 15th in Winterberg World Cup". Winter Sports. Olympic Winter Institute of Australia. 9 December 2012 – via Trove.
- "Bobsleigh - Radjenovic/Pittman 14th in Park City". Winter Sports. Olympic Winter Institute of Australia. 6 December 2013 – via Trove.
- "Bobsleigh: Record entry by Australian bobsledders". Winter Sports. Olympic Winter Institute of Australia. 3 December 2003 – via Trove.
- "Bobsleigh woman in weightlifting team". The Sydney Morning Herald. 8 September 2006.
- "Coast runnings". Sunshine Coast Daily. 27 May 2009.
- "Cool runnings island style". Torres News. No. 992. 30 November 2011 – via Trove.
- "Europe Cup: Altenberg – 16.12.2010 - 09:00 – 2-woman bobsleigh". International Bobsleigh and Skeleton Federation.
- "Europe Cup: Cesana – 14.01.2010 - 14:00 – 2-woman bobsleigh". International Bobsleigh and Skeleton Federation.
- "Europe Cup: Cesana – 24.11.2010 - 14:00 – 2-woman bobsleigh". International Bobsleigh and Skeleton Federation.
- "Europe Cup: Innsbruck – 18.11.2010 - 15:00 – 2-woman bobsleigh". International Bobsleigh and Skeleton Federation.
- "Europe Cup: Innsbruck – 20.11.2010 - 10:00 – 2-woman bobsleigh". International Bobsleigh and Skeleton Federation.
- "Europe Cup: Innsbruck – 17.11.2011 - 15:00 – 2-woman bobsleigh". International Bobsleigh and Skeleton Federation.
- "Europe Cup: Innsbruck – 19.11.2011 - 10:00 – 2-woman bobsleigh". International Bobsleigh and Skeleton Federation.
- "Europe Cup: Königssee – 25.11.2011 - 09:00 – 2-woman bobsleigh". International Bobsleigh and Skeleton Federation.
- "Europe Cup: Königssee – 26.11.2011 - 15:00 – 2-woman bobsleigh". International Bobsleigh and Skeleton Federation.
- "Europe Cup: St. Moritz – Celerina – 21.01.2011 - 09:00 – 2-woman bobsleigh". International Bobsleigh and Skeleton Federation.
- "Europe Cup: St. Moritz – Celerina – 22.01.2011 - 09:00 – 2-woman bobsleigh". International Bobsleigh and Skeleton Federation.
- "Europe Cup: Winterberg – 08.12.2010 - 10:00 – 2-woman bobsleigh". International Bobsleigh and Skeleton Federation.
- "Europe Cup: Winterberg – 09.12.2010 - 10:00 – 2-woman bobsleigh". International Bobsleigh and Skeleton Federation.
- "First Aussie women at World Bobsleigh Championships". Winter Sports. Olympic Winter Institute of Australia. 15 February 2005 – via Trove.
- "First top 20 bobsleigh result for Australian duo". Winter Sports. Olympic Winter Institute of Australia. 11 December 2004 – via Trove.
- "Germany take women's bobsleigh gold, Aussies 14th". ABC News. Agence France-Presse. 21 February 2006.
- "Historical Results: Astrid LOCH-WILKINSON (NSW)". Australian Athletics. n.d.
- "Historical Results: Australian Youth Track & Field Championships - 1998-99". Australian Athletics. n.d.
- "Historical Results: Australian Track & Field Championships - 1999-2000". Australian Athletics. n.d.
- "IBSF World Cup: Altenberg – 06.01.2012 - 13:30 – 2-woman bobsleigh". International Bobsleigh and Skeleton Federation.
- "IBSF World Cup: Altenberg – 04.01.2013 - 10:00 – 2-woman bobsleigh". International Bobsleigh and Skeleton Federation.
- "IBSF World Cup: Calgary – 10.11.2005 - 17:00 – 2-woman bobsleigh". International Bobsleigh and Skeleton Federation.
- "IBSF World Cup: Calgary – 10.02.2012 - 22:00 – 2-woman bobsled". International Bobsleigh and Skeleton Federation.
- "IBSF World Cup: Calgary – 30.11.2013 - 22:00 – 2-woman bobsleigh". International Bobsleigh and Skeleton Federation.
- "IBSF World Cup: Cesana Pariol – 21.01.2005 - 16:05 – 2-woman bobsleigh". International Bobsleigh and Skeleton Federation.
- "IBSF World Cup: Cesana – 05.02.2011 - 10:00 – 2-woman bobsleigh". International Bobsleigh and Skeleton Federation.
- "IBSF World Cup: Cortina – 16.12.2005 - 09:35 – 2-woman bobsleigh". International Bobsleigh and Skeleton Federation.
- "IBSF World Cup: Innsbruck – 14.01.2011 - 14:20 – 2-woman bobsleigh". International Bobsleigh and Skeleton Federation.
- "IBSF World Cup: Innsbruck – 02.12.2011 - 12:00 – 2-woman bobsleigh". International Bobsleigh and Skeleton Federation.
- "IBSF World Cup: Innsbruck – 18.01.2013 - 12:00 – 2-woman bobsleigh". International Bobsleigh and Skeleton Federation.
- "IBSF World Cup: Innsbruck – 19.01.2014 - 14:00 – 2-woman bobsleigh". International Bobsleigh and Skeleton Federation.
- "IBSF World Cup: Königssee – 13.01.2006 - 20:35 – 2-woman bobsleigh". International Bobsleigh and Skeleton Federation.
- "IBSF World Cup: Königssee –13.01.2012 - 12:00 – 2-woman bobsleigh". International Bobsleigh and Skeleton Federation.
- "IBSF World Cup: Königssee – 11.01.2013 - 13:30 – 2-woman bobsleigh". International Bobsleigh and Skeleton Federation.
- "IBSF World Cup: Königssee – 26.01.2014 - 10:00 – 2-woman bobsleigh". International Bobsleigh and Skeleton Federation.
- "IBSF World Cup: La Plagne – 09.12.2011 - 15:30 – 2-woman bobsleigh". International Bobsleigh and Skeleton Federation.
- "IBSF World Cup: La Plagne – 14.12.2012 - 13:25 – 2-woman bobsleigh". International Bobsleigh and Skeleton Federation.
- "IBSF World Cup: Lake Placid – 18.11.2005 - 15:05 – 2-woman bobsleigh". International Bobsleigh and Skeleton Federation.
- "IBSF World Cup: Lake Placid – 09.11.2012 - 15:00 – 2-woman bobsleigh". International Bobsleigh and Skeleton Federation.
- "IBSF World Cup: Lake Placid – 14.12.2013 - 19:00 – 2-woman bobsleigh". International Bobsleigh and Skeleton Federation.
- "IBSF World Cup: Nagano – 10.12.2004 - 17:05 – 2-woman bobsleigh". International Bobsleigh and Skeleton Federation.
- "IBSF World Cup: Nagano – 09.12.2005 - 18:04 – 2-woman bobsleigh". International Bobsleigh and Skeleton Federation.
- "IBSF World Cup: Park City – 17.11.2012 - 01:00 – 2-woman bobsleigh". International Bobsleigh and Skeleton Federation.
- "IBSF World Cup: Park City – 06.12.2013 - 23:00 – 2-woman bobsleigh". International Bobsleigh and Skeleton Federation.
- "IBSF World Cup: Park City – 07.12.2013 - 18:00 – 2-woman bobsleigh". International Bobsleigh and Skeleton Federation.
- "IBSF World Cup: Sochi – 15.02.2013 - 17:00 – 2-woman bobsleigh". International Bobsleigh and Skeleton Federation.
- "IBSF World Cup: St. Moritz – Celerina – 28.01.2005 - 11:37 – 2-woman bobsleigh". International Bobsleigh and Skeleton Federation.
- "IBSF World Cup: St. Moritz – Celerina – 20.01.2006 - 14:17 – 2-woman bobsleigh". International Bobsleigh and Skeleton Federation.
- "IBSF World Cup: St. Moritz – Celerina – 29.01.2011 - 13:15 – 2-woman bobsleigh". International Bobsleigh and Skeleton Federation.
- "IBSF World Cup: St. Moritz – Celerina – 20.01.2012 - 13:00 – 2-woman bobsled". International Bobsleigh and Skeleton Federation.
- "IBSF World Cup: St. Moritz - Celerina – 11.01.2014 - 09:45 – 2-woman bobsleigh". International Bobsleigh and Skeleton Federation.
- "IBSF World Cup: Whistler – 03.02.2012 - 03:30 – 2-woman bobsleigh". International Bobsleigh and Skeleton Federation.
- "IBSF World Cup: Whistler – 24.11.2012 - 03:30 – 2-woman bobsleigh". International Bobsleigh and Skeleton Federation.
- "IBSF World Cup: Winterberg – 17.12.2011 - 09:00 – 2-woman bobsleigh". International Bobsleigh and Skeleton Federation.
- "IBSF World Cup: Winterberg – 08.12.2012 - 09:00 – 2-woman bobsleigh". International Bobsleigh and Skeleton Federation.
- "IBSF World Cup: Winterberg – 05.01.2014 - 09:00 – 2-woman bobsleigh". International Bobsleigh and Skeleton Federation.
- "IMG VOWG Athletes Australian Astrid Loch-Wilkinson a-feature". Foxtel. 26 February 2010. Archived from the original on 26 February 2010.
- "Intercontinental Cup: Lake Placid – 18.11.2005 - 15:05 – 2-woman bobsleigh". International Bobsleigh and Skeleton Federation.
- "Loch-Wilkinson 14th after two runs". New South Wales Institute of Sport. 21 February 2006 – via Trove.
- "North American Cup: Calgary – 11.12.2009 - 02:00 – 2-woman bobsleigh". International Bobsleigh and Skeleton Federation.
- "North American Cup: Lake Placid 18.12.2009 – 2-woman bobsleigh results". International Bobsleigh and Skeleton Federation. 18 December 2009.
- "North American Cup: Park City 01.12.2009 – 2-woman bobsleigh results". International Bobsleigh and Skeleton Federation. 1 December 2009.
- "North American Cup: Park City 02.12.2009 – 2-woman bobsleigh results". International Bobsleigh and Skeleton Federation. 2 December 2009.
- "North American Cup: Park City 03.12.2009 – 2-woman bobsleigh results". International Bobsleigh and Skeleton Federation. 3 December 2009.
- "North American Cup: Park City – 21.11.2013 - 22:00 – 2-woman bobsleigh". International Bobsleigh and Skeleton Federation.
- "North American Cup: Park City – 22.11.2013 - 22:00 – 2-woman bobsleigh". International Bobsleigh and Skeleton Federation.
- "North American Cup: Park City – 23.11.2013 - 22:00 – 2-woman bobsleigh". International Bobsleigh and Skeleton Federation.
- "NT rep helps Litchfield wreck University". Sunday Territorian. 22 July 2008. p. 36. NewsBank 1221248B52CEBE38.
- "Olympic final speed all in a day's work". University of Sydney. 8 March 2006 – via Trove.
- "Olympic Winter Games: Cesana Pariol – 20.02.2006 - 01:30 / 21.02.2006 - 01:30 – 2-woman bobsleigh". International Bobsleigh and Skeleton Federation.
- "Olympic Winter Games: Whistler – 24.02.2010 - 02:00 / 24.02.2010 - 17:00 – 2-woman Bobsleigh". International Bobsleigh and Skeleton Federation.
- "Pittman looks to trade up in dash for bobsleigh glory". Sunshine Coast Daily. 7 March 2013.
- "Record team picked for Winter Games". ABC News. 24 January 2006.
- "Record top five finish by women's bob duo". Australian Olympic Committee. 30 November 2004.
- "Scot in the running for Aussie bobsleigh". The Scotsman. 4 September 2010.
- "Sex and drugs rock Olympics!". Hindustan Times. 28 January 2006.
- "Shooting bobsleigh stars take aim at Sochi". Sydney Observer Magazine (Interview). 13 February 2014.
- "Slim Win Makes Uni Champions". Australian & British Soccer Weekly. Vol. 23, no. 1151. 2 September 2003. p. 19 – via Internet Archive.
- "Sochi 2014: Jana Pittman, Astrid Radjenovic finish 14th in women's bobsleigh". ABC News. 19 February 2014.
- "Solid result for Australia's bobsleigh team". Winter Sports. Olympic Winter Institute of Australia. 15 December 2013 – via Trove.
- "St. Moritz a tough course for skeleton pair". Winter Sports. Olympic Winter Institute of Australia. 10 January 2014 – via Trove.
- "Third consecutive podium for Aussie pilot". Australian Olympic Committee. 3 December 2009.
- "Thrilling finish for student Olympic bobsledder". University of Sydney. 23 February 2006 – via Trove.
- "Torino 2006: Australia at the Games". Australian Olympic Committee.
- "Two of three bob teams make Torino start list". Winter Sports. Olympic Winter Institute of Australia. 23 January 2006 – via Trove.
- "UNSW Win Under 21's". Australian & British Soccer Weekly. Vol. 23, no. 1151. 2 September 2003. p. 19 – via Internet Archive.
- "Weighting game for ice queen". The Australian. 8 September 2006 – via Trove.
- "Wharfie women's Charity surprise". Sunday Territorian. 1 April 2008. p. 34. NewsBank 11FC3ECC2D605D10.
- "Women bobbers race to season-best". Winter Sports. Olympic Winter Institute of Australia. 13 December 2005 – via Trove.
- "Women's bob duo delivers Australia's first medal". Australian Olympic Committee. 26 November 2005.
- "Women's bob pair make top 20 in World Cup". Winter Sports. Olympic Winter Institute of Australia. 11 November 2005 – via Trove.
- "World Championships: Calgary – 25.02.2005 - 18:05 / 26.02.2005 - 10:05 – 2-woman bobsleigh". International Bobsleigh and Skeleton Federation.
- "World Championships: Königssee – 18.02.2011 - 10:30 / 19.02.2011 - 10:30 – 2-woman bobsleigh". International Bobsleigh and Skeleton Federation.
- "World Championships: Lake Placid – 16.02.2012 - 23:00 / 17.02.2012 - 17:00 - 2-woman bobsled". International Bobsleigh and Skeleton Federation.
- "World Championships: St. Moritz – Celerina – 25.01.2013 - 10:05 / 26.01.2013 - 10:05 – 2-woman bobsleigh". International Bobsleigh and Skeleton Federation.
- Bastians, Kate (20 February 2014). "Local competitors knocked out of Winter Olympics but learn lots". The Daily Telegraph.
- Baum, Greg (25 February 2010). "Two bobs' worth". The Sydney Morning Herald.
- Bode, Mark (1 June 2012). "Call for funding works a treat". Sunshine Coast Daily.
- "Canada gold and silver in women's bobsled". The West Australian. 25 February 2010.
- Brown, Aimee (10 August 2004). "Sydney Uni edge out Coasties". Australian & British Soccer Weekly. Vol. 24, no. 1200. p. 22 – via Internet Archive.
- Brown, Aimee (8 June 2004). "Saints decimate lowly raptors". Australian & British Soccer Weekly. Vol. 24, no. 1191. p. 22 – via Internet Archive.
- Brunt, Kasey (11 January 2007). "Bobsledder keeps her cool in tropics". Northern Territory News. p. 3. NewsBank 11693EEF630C07D8.
- Croker, Graham (5 September 2003). "Historic grand final win for women's soccer club". University of Sydney – via Trove.
- Cullen, Glenn (5 December 2012). "Former track star Jana Pittman could be set for a move to the Winter Olympics in a bobsled". Fox Sports (Australia). Australian Associated Press.
- Herbertson, Lisa (15 January 2014). "Astrid Radjenovic looks to steer Australia to gold in the bobsleigh". The Daily Telegraph.
- Holmberg, Walle (10 February 2006). "Down under och utför" [Down under and out]. Helsingborgs Dagblad (in Swedish).
- Jordan, Bev (16 October 2013). "Aussie Icebirds member Jana Pittman hopes to blaze new trail at Sochi Winter Olympics". Herald Sun.
- Lulham, Amanda (5 September 2013). "Former athletics champion Jana Pittman wants her own miracle on ice as Olympic bobsledder". News.com.au.
- Magnay, Jacquelin (20 February 2006). "Grieving Reed still keeping her focus". Sport Monday. The Sydney Morning Herald. Vol. 175, no. 52, 551. p. 13. ProQuest 3294454707.
- Meyn, Travis (25 October 2009). "Cross fires to wrap up top honour". Sunshine Coast Daily.
- Meyn, Travis (23 December 2009). "From beach to bobsleigh". Sunshine Coast Daily.
- Meyn, Travis (29 January 2010). "Kawana winter olympian excluded". Sunshine Coast Daily.
- Meyn, Travis (26 February 2010). "Sledder's hopes went sliding away". Sunshine Coast Daily.
- "Jamie Flying in the snow among world's best". Torres News. No. 946. 12 January 2011. p. 23 – via Trove.
- "Jamie Hedge off to World Cup". Torres News. No. 959. 13 April 2011. p. 10 – via Trove.
- Mobbs, Adam (13 January 2013). "Jana Pittman switches from athletics to bobsleigh for a shot of representing Australian at the Olympics". News.com.au.
- Nedimovic, Aneta (19 August 2010). "Warm weather snow problem for Brisbane bobsleigh team". The Sydney Morning Herald. Archived from the original on 2 March 2026.
- Powers, Catie (12 December 2025). "Jana Pittman was one of Australia's greatest athletes. Then she lost everything and moved into her garage". Mamamia.
- Sharwood, Anthony (20 February 2014). "Fresh from Sochi games Jana Pittman considers tilt at Rio Olympics". Herald Sun.
- Sharwood, Anthony; Lehmann, John (18 February 2014). "Jana Pittman's first bobsleigh run was almost her last". The Daily Telegraph.
- Stanley, Arthur (28 November 2005). "Bobsleigh team win silver and stun rivals". The Daily Telegraph, Sunday Style Magazine. p. 64. NewsBank 10E272793B7B9D88.
- Welsh, Fiona (11 March 2010). "Taking the lead". The Australian, Weekender. p. 13. NewsBank 12EF4F0D614E0040.
- Zemek, Steve (25 January 2012). "Astrid has Games spot in her sights". Sunshine Coast Daily. p. A-44.
- Zemek, Steve (25 January 2011). "Aussies earn place in World Cup". Sunshine Coast Daily.
- Zemek, Steve (3 June 2010). "Bobsledder hunt's on". Sunshine Coast Daily.
- Zemek, Steve (12 May 2010). "Team hopes for 2014 Olympics". Sunshine Coast Daily.
