= Hershtik =

Herstik, Hershtik (Hebrew: הרשטיק) is a Jewish family and surname Magyarized from Yiddish: Hershshtok (German: Hirschstock, or Herzstock):

- Gustav Herstik
- Moshe Menachem Herstik, a chazzan
  - Naftali Hershtik, a Hungarian-Israeli chazzan
    - Netanel Herstik, a chazzan
    - Shraga Herstik, a chazzan
- Ron Herstik, rabbi, founder of Dor Ḥadash
- Les Herstik, speed skier
