= Ellie Gaffney =

Torres Strait Islander-Indonesian nurse, writer and activist (1932-2007)

Ellie Joan Gaffney, also affectionately known as Bebe Ellie, (18 August 1932 - 13 October 2007) was a Torres Strait Islander-Indonesian nurse, midwife, writer and Indigenous rights activist.

She is the author of numerous publications, including her autobiography: Somebody Now: The autobiography of Ellie Gaffney, a woman of the Torres Strait (1989).

== Early life ==
Gaffney was born on Thursday Island (Waiben) and she was the last child of nine children born to Thomas and Gertrude (née Summers) Loban. Her father's birth name was Simeon Sadir and he had been kidnapped as a child from Banda Neira and, later, was recruited to work as a spy for the Australian Naval Intelligence Service during World War I. Because of this service Loban was granted a permanent exemption to the White Australia policy and, as a side effect, this also granted his family exceptions from restrictions on them based on their Aboriginality.

This put the family in a unique position for, as a mixed Asian-Indigenous family they were not allowed to live on Mabuiag Island, her mothers Country, as this was designated to be for Islanders only. Instead, in 1937, they moved to the Cape York Peninsula, where they lived nearby to Injinoo and Gaffney was able to attend school nearby.

At the outbreak of World War II, in which her eldest brother served, the family returned to Waiben but, following the bombing of Darwin, Gaffney along with her mother and her sister Jean, were evacuated and sent to Cherbourg Aboriginal Settlement and, from there, moved to Brisbane until they were able to return home in 1947.

The disruption of the war meant that Gaffney had been unable to complete her schooling so in Waiben caught up on her studies, with the help of a Catholic nun, and also began working as an assistant nurse. Finally, in 1954 at the age of 22, Gaffney was able to enrol in nursing training at the Royal Brisbane Hospital.

== Career as a nurse ==
As a trainee nurse Gaffney excelled in her training and, following the completion of her studies in 1957, she first took her skills to the hospital at Waiben before returning to Brisbane to complete midwifery training. She returned home in 1961 and began working as a double certified nurse at the Thursday Island Hospital. While at the hospital Gaffney was the first Torres Strait Islander nurse allowed to live in the nurses quarters, generally only allowed for white staff, and in the quarters there were notices displayed telling residents that ‘[n]ursing sisters must not attend coloured Islander's parties or homes’.

Despite her skills and qualifications, and still in the early 1960s, Gaffney was fired from the hospital and banned from working there for six years as she had given birth to two children outside of marriage. She appealed this decision but it was not overturned. Of this she wrote in her autobiography:

The incentive to return home to work was killed because of the parochial and discriminatory attitudes inflicted on us [herself and the other Islander nurses] by the pseudo experts. I was banned by these experts from working at this tin pot hospital on Thursday Island for six years, for the sole reason that they disapproved of my private life, not because of any defect in my nursing, which I believe was some of the best nursing care, if not the best they ever had at the Thursday Island Hospital, at that time.

— Ellie Gaffney, Somebody Now (1989)

Initially after losing her job Gaffney stayed on Waiben and took a job in the kitchen of a local hotel but soon after, in 1963, took a role as a hospital matron at Yarrabah. On 8 July 1967 she married Anthony Gaffney, who had moved with her from Waiben, in nearby Cairns and together they had one child. They moved around regularly, following Gaffney's work and spent some time together in the Northern Territory.

In 1979, while working at Royal Darwin Hospital, Gaffney found out that the role of nursing superintendent at the Thursday Island Hospital would soon be available and she was encouraged to apply. Wanting more chance to win the position, Gaffney undertook a diploma of nursing administration at the Queensland Institute of Technology and returned to live at Waiben. Despite the diploma, she was still not successful in her application for the role, and a non-Torres Strait Islander nurse was appointed. The hospital board claimed that the candidate selected had superior qualifications but this was challenged by the advocacy group Torres Strait Forum.

Gaffney decided to remain at Waiben and that, because of this experience, she would not longer pursue a career in nursing, despite her love for it, and accused the hospital board of practicing 'dirty politics'.

== Post nursing career ==
In 1980 Gaffney began working for Aboriginal Hostels Ltd and, in this role, helped to establish and run the Jumula Dubbins Aboriginal Hostel. At the hostel she assisted in providing accommodation and also hosted community events and workshops. She also became a public advocate from her community and wrote letters to the editor to the Torres News showing her support for her community alongside demanding change.

In 1982, in addition to her work at the hostel, Gaffney also became an agent for the Department of Social Services and would assist people in registering for and claiming Commonwealth benefits (such as what is now known as Centrelink). She also advocated for change in this field and asked that the government to pay Torres Strait Islander people directly; before this time lump sum cheques had been paid to other government departments to administer rather than to individuals.

In the early 1980s Gaffney was also an active member of the Island Coordinating Council and was a member of the Queensland Advisory Council for the Australian Broadcasting Commission. In 1985 she was instrumental in establishing the Torres Strait Islander Media Association and, also in 1985, attended the United Nations World Conference on Women in Nairobi, Kenya.

In 1986 she was appointed to the Council of the Australian Institute of Aboriginal Studies on which she worked for national recognition of Torres Strait Islander people and, in 1988, joined a movement for the Torres Strait to secede from Australia.

Also in 1988 Gaffney established the Mura Kosker Sorority, an organisation aimed at raising the status of Torres Strait Islander Women and, in her role as president, attended the 1989 United Nations World Council of Indigenous People meeting which was held in Geneva, Switzerland.

In 1989 Gaffney published her autobiography: Somebody Now: The autobiography of Ellie Gaffney, a woman of the Torres Strait (1989).

In the 1990 Gaffney began to step down from numerous community roles, however, despite this continued to work hard and was instrumental in establishing two more homes on Waiben; the Lena Passi Women’s Shelter (1994), and Star of the Sea Home (1995). In 1997, when a new community health centre was opened, she returned to healthcare and became its manager until her retirement in 2000.

In 2006 Gaffney published Mura solwata kosker: We Saltwater Women about the history of the Mura Kosker Sorority, and the struggle for Indigenous women's rights in the region and their story is told in the contest of the broader struggle for Aboriginal rights.

Gaffney died on 13 October 2007 and her obituary stated:

Bebe Ellie was a very strong, determined and proud Torres Strait Islander woman. She saw the injustices her people endured and went out to bring justice back into their lives

— Obituary; taken from eulogy read by Aven S Noah, Torres News, 31 October 2007

== Awards and honours ==
On 11 June 1990 Gaffney was appointed a Member of the Order of Australia in "recognition of service to the community, particularly the Aboriginal and Torres Strait Islander communities".

== Publications ==
- Somebody Now: The autobiography of Ellie Gaffney, a woman of the Torres Strait (1989).
- Mura solwata kosker: We Saltwater Women (2006).
- Determination to Succeed (2005), appears in: In Our Own Right : Black Australian Nurses' Stories 2005; (p. 98-102).
- The Learning Time (2024) (an autobiography extract) appears in: Growing Up Torres Strait Islander in Australia; (p. 121-126).
