= Emily Thomas =

Emily Thomas may refer to:

- Emily Thomas (gymnast) (born 2001), Welsh gymnast
- Emily Thomas (snowboarder) (born 1973), Australian snowboarder
- Emily Thomas (swimmer), New Zealand swimmer
- Emily Thomas (Harukuna Receive), a character in Japanese manga series Harukana Receive
