= Yoshiharu Arino =

Japanese speed skater (born 1980)

Personal information
- Nationality: Japanese
- Born: 15 August 1980 (age 44); Tokyo, Japan

Sport
- Sport: Short track speed skating

Yoshiharu Arino (born 15 August 1980) is a Japanese short track speed skater. He competed in the men's 5000 metre relay event at the 2006 Winter Olympics.
