= Duncan Pugh =

Australian bobsledder (1974–2023)

Personal information
- Nationality: Australian
- Born: 2 December 1974; Cheltenham, Gloucestershire, England
- Died: 25 January 2023 (aged 48); Perth, Western Australia, Australia
- Height: 1.90 m (6 ft 3 in)
- Weight: 105 kg (231 lb)

Sport
- Country: Australia (2007–2010)
- Sport: Bobsleigh

Achievements and titles
- Olympic finals: Vancouver 2010

Duncan Michael Pugh (2 December 1974 – 25 January 2023) was an Australian bobsledder.

== Early life ==
Pugh was born in Cheltenham, Gloucestershire. In 1981, he and his family moved to Perth, Western Australia. As a youth, he competed in athletics. At age 12, he represented Western Australia at the Australian track and field championships. He specialised in the 400m hurdles.

Pugh attended Trinity College and Edith Cowan University. After completing university with a degree in physical and outdoor education, he returned to England to work at several schools in London.

== Career ==
Pugh was introduced to bobsleigh by Ted Polglaze and debuted on the international circuit in 2007 at the age of 32. He won bronze at the 2009 America's Cup in Canada with Christopher Spring. He then qualified for the 2010 Vancouver Games but was knocked out in the first round when he and pilot Jeremy Rolleston's sled flipped over and saw them slide down the course upside-down.

== Personal life ==
Pugh was the son of Diane and David. He had two sisters, Rebecca and Hannah.

Pugh and his wife McKenzie had two sons.

Pugh taught at Newman College in Perth for 17 years. He was also a surf lifesaver and a volunteer rugby coach at Wests Scarborough Rugby Union Club.

== Death ==
On 24 January 2023, Pugh suffered a brain aneurysm in his hometown, Perth. He died the following day at the age of 48.
