= Sydney Observer Magazine =

Australian magazine

Sydney Observer
- Type: Monthly magazine
- Format: A4
- Owner: Kamdha Pty Ltd
- Editor: Jay Houhlias
- Staff writers: 6
- Founded: 1996
- Language: English
- Circulation: 35,000
- Readership: 100,000
- ISSN: 2207-8991
- Website: www.sydneyobserver.com

Sydney Observer, previously known as the Ku-ring-gai Observer, is Sydney North Shore's free monthly magazine, distributed in the council areas of Ku-ring-gai, Hornsby and Willoughby. It is the only free monthly magazine in the Ku-ring-gai Council local government area.

Since 2002 Sydney Observer magazine has been published by Kamdha Pty Ltd. It is a lifestyle magazine which contains news and current affairs relating to the North Shore and has other sections related to property and finance, health, travel, fashion and beauty, dining, music and theatre, arts and entertainment, seniors and a diary of events.

It publishes news and local items of interest to North Shore local readers and covers additional topics of broader interest to people within the greater Sydney metropolitan area. In the past, articles have been submitted to the Australian Senate for further discussion.

The magazine is distributed free of charge to households, retail stores, major shopping centres, libraries, and community centres in the first week of the month. It is also available on-line in portable document format (PDF).

In February 2020, the magazine was redesigned.
