= Elliott Shriane =

Australian speed skater

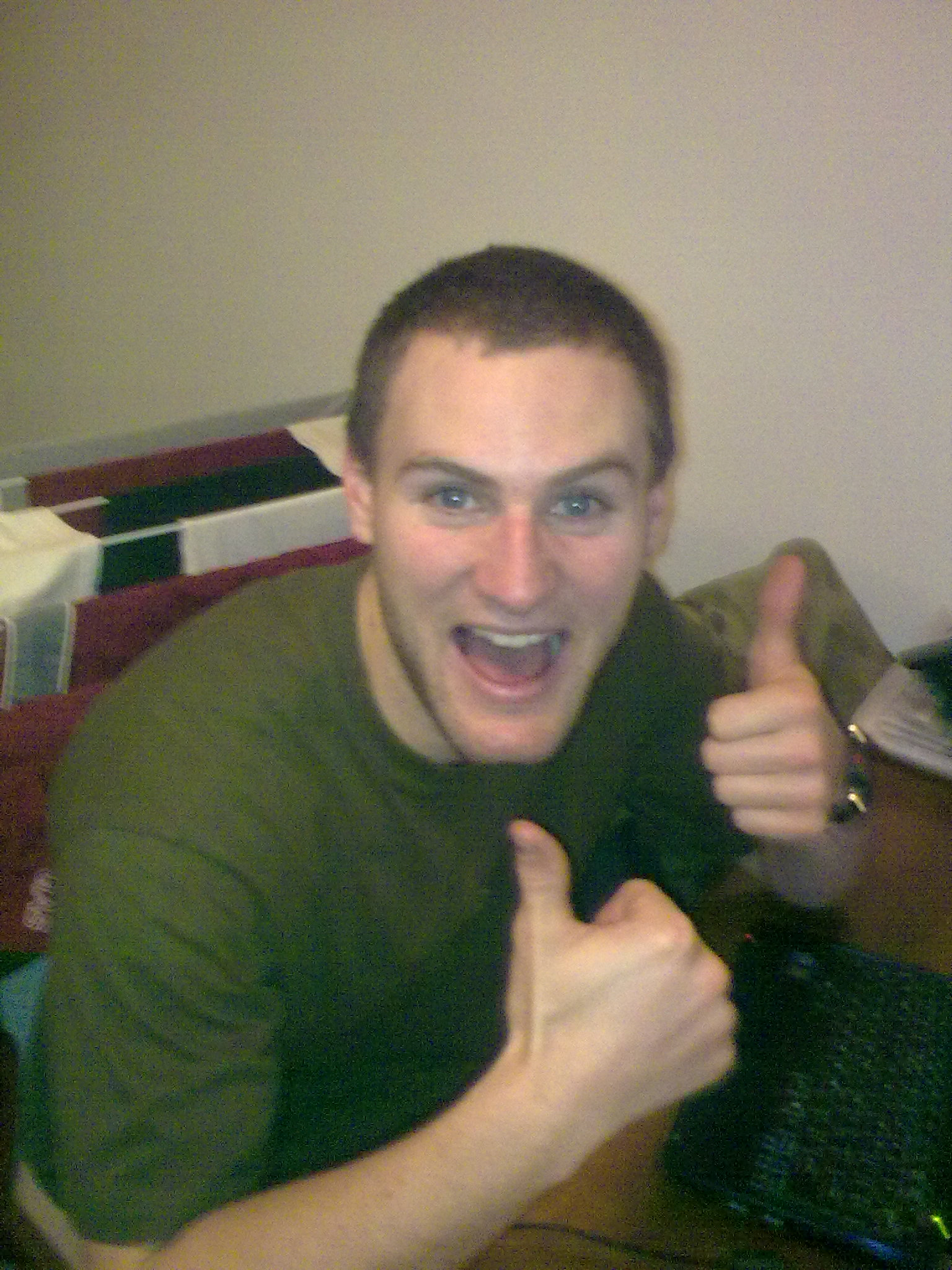
- Shriane in 2009

Personal information
- Born: 27 April 1987 (age 39)

Sport
- Country: Australia
- Sport: Short track speed skating

Elliott Shriane (born 27 April 1987) is an Olympic short track speed skater from Brisbane, Australia.

== 2006 Winter Olympics ==
Shriane represented Australia in the 2006 Winter Olympic Games in Turin, Italy, competing in the men's 5000m relay event. The relay team achieved fourth in the semi-final, and first in the B final in a time of 7:01.666 for a final placing of sixth for the competition.

== 2005 World Cup ==
He was a skater in the World Cup relay team which placed fifth in the Bormio World Cup in November 2005, qualifying Australia for the event in the 2006 Winter Olympic Games and setting the Australian national record in the process.

== 2010 Winter Olympics ==
Shriane was just outside selection for the Australian team in 2010.

== Individual competition ==
Shriane competed on the international circuit for four years as an individual, specialising in the 500m event. He was placed 27th in the 500m in the 2005/06 China World Cup, and 15th in the 2007/08 China World Cup. Other notable results included 2nd place in the 2005 Australian Open Championships, and 8th place in the 2000m relay event at the Junior World Championships in Belgrade, Serbia in 2005.

== Later career ==
Shriane retired from competitive short track speed skating after the 2009/10 season.
