= Jonathan Sweet (skier) =

Australian freestyle skier

Personal information
- Nationality: Australian
- Born: 21 August 1973 (age 52) Melbourne, Australia

Sport
- Sport: Freestyle skiing

Jonathan Sweet (born 21 August 1973) is an Australian freestyle skier. He competed in the men's aerials event at the 1998 Winter Olympics.
