= Anthony Ryan (writer) =

Scottish writer (born 1970)

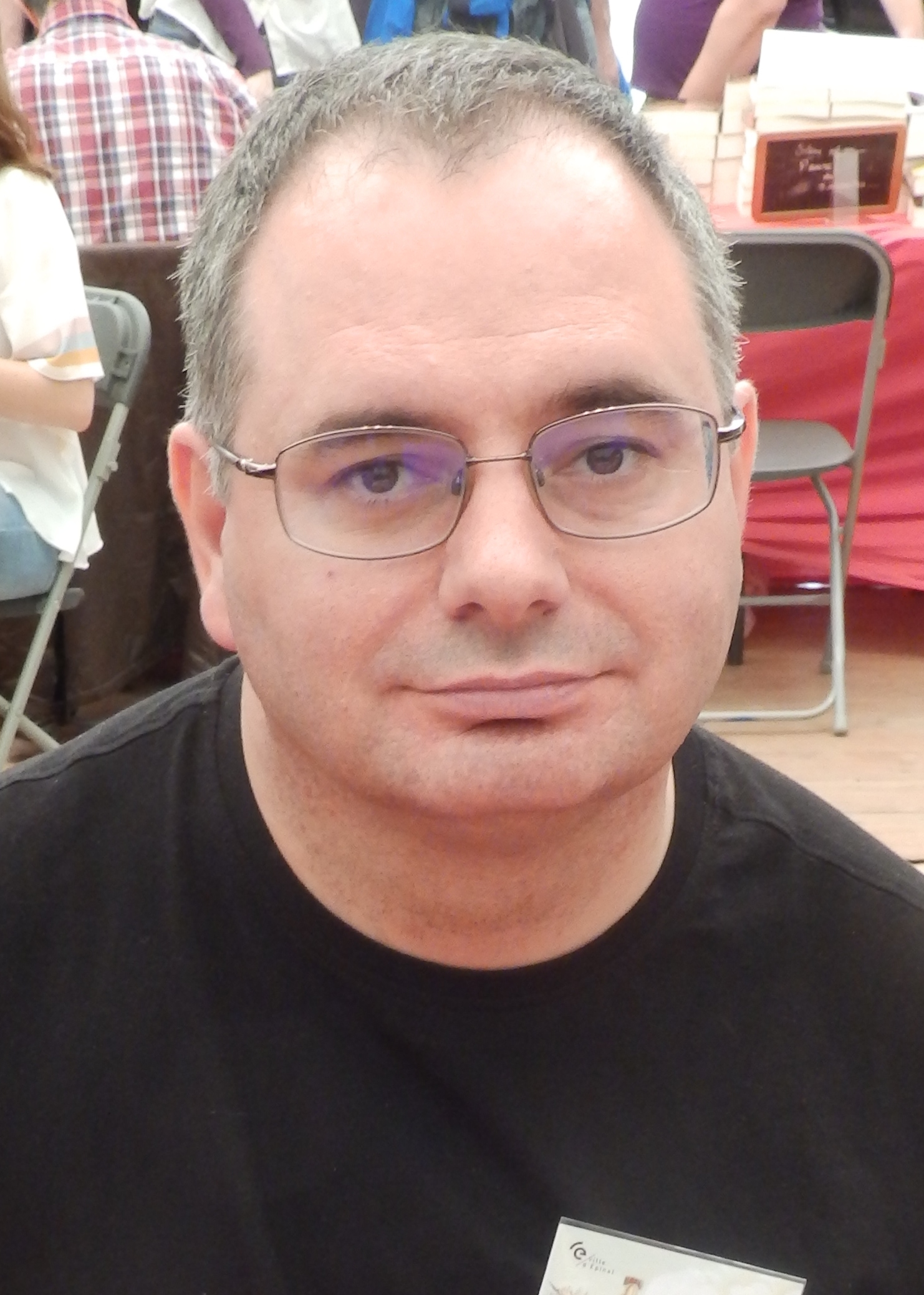
- Anthony Ryan, 2016
- Born: 1970 (age 55–56); Scotland, United Kingdom
- Writing career
- Genres: Fantasy and science fiction
- Notable work: Raven's Shadow series
- Website: anthonyryan.net

Anthony Ryan is a Scottish writer of fantasy and science fiction, best known for his books about Vaelin Al Sorna, which started in 2013 with Blood Song. He worked as a full-time researcher before switching to full-time writing. He currently lives in London, England. He has a degree in Medieval History.

== Biography ==
Anthony Ryan was born in Scotland in 1970 but has spent much of his adult life in London. Anthony Ryan initially self-published Blood Song, however, he switched to major publication when Penguin books offered him a three-book deal in May 2012. He started writing full-time after the success of the publication. He continues to self-publish a series of SF Noir novellas.

== Bibliography ==
=== Raven's Shadow Universe ===
==== Raven's Shadow ====
- Blood Song (2012)
- Tower Lord (2014)
- Queen of Fire (2015)

==== Raven's Blade ====
- The Wolf's Call (2019)
- The Black Song (2020)

=== Slab City Blues ===
- Slab City Blues (2011)
- A Song for Madame Choi (2011)
- A Hymn to Gods Long Dead (2012)
- The Ballad of Bad Jack (2013)
- An Aria for Ragnarok (2015)
- Slab City Blues: The Collected Stories (2015)

=== The Draconis Memoria ===
- The Waking Fire (2016)
- The Legion of Flame (2017)
- The Empire of Ashes (2018)

=== Seven Swords series ===
- The Scarlet Ziggurat (2023)
- A Pilgrimage of Swords (2019)
- The Kraken’s Tooth (2020)
- City of Songs (2021)
- To Blackfyre Keep (2022)
- Across the Sorrow Sea (2023)
- The Road of Storms (2024)
- The Infernus Gate (2025)

=== The Covenant of Steel ===
- The Pariah (2021)
- The Martyr (2022)
- The Traitor (2023)

=== Age of Wrath ===
- A Tide of Black Steel (2024)
- Born of an Iron Storm (2025)
- Upon the Forge of Battle (2026}

=== Short stories ===
Raven's Shadow

- The Lord Collector. Available in Blackguards Anthology.
- A Duel of Evils. Available in Unfettered II Anthology.
- The Lady of Crows
- Many Are the Dead
- Songs of the Dark (Subterranean Press 2020) Collects four stories listed above.

The Draconis Memoria

- Sandrunners. Available in Legends II Anthology - Stories in Honour of David Gemmell.
