= Ramone Cooper =

Australian freestyle skier and sport administrator

Personal information
- Nationality: Australian
- Born: May 3, 1988 (age 37) Australia

Sport
- Sport: Freestyle skiing
- Event: Moguls

Achievements and titles
- Olympic finals: Vancouver 2010
- Updated on April 2025

Ramone Cooper OLY (born 3 May 1988) is an Australian former freestyle skier and sport administrator. He is the current General Director of the International Ski Mountaineering Federation (ISMF), the global governing body for ski mountaineering, recognised by the International Olympic Committee (IOC). Cooper represented Australia in the men's moguls event at the 2010 Winter Olympics in Vancouver.

== Early life and skiing career ==
Cooper competed internationally in freestyle skiing from 2003 to 2011. He appeared in 21 FIS Freestyle World Cup events and two FIS Freestyle World Ski Championships (2007, 2009). His best career result came with an 8th-place finish in moguls at the World Cup in Lake Placid, United States, on 18 January 2008.

He was a scholarship holder with the New South Wales Institute of Sport, Australian Institute of Sport and the Olympic Winter Institute of Australia. Despite sustaining a serious knee injury just weeks before the Games, Cooper recovered in time to represent Australia in moguls at the 2010 Winter Olympics in Vancouver, where he placed 27th.

== Olympic movement roles ==
Cooper has served the Australian Olympic Committee (AOC) in multiple leadership capacities. He was Chef de Mission for the Australian team at the 2020 Winter Youth Olympics in Lausanne and the 2024 Winter Youth Olympics in Gangwon. He also served as Performance Manager for the Australian Olympic Teams at Sochi 2014, PyeongChang 2018, and Beijing 2022.

He was selected as a Young Ambassador for the Innsbruck 2012 Winter Youth Olympics. From 2014 to 2016, Cooper served as Deputy Chair of the AOC Athletes’ Commission and remained involved in athlete development and advocacy work beyond his term.

== International Ski Mountaineering Federation ==
In 2023, Cooper was elected vice president for Marketing and Communications of the International Ski Mountaineering Federation.

In January 2025, he was appointed as the ISMF's full-time General Director, based in Lausanne, Switzerland.
