= Sunshine Coast Daily =

Daily newspaper serving the Sunshine Coast, Queensland

- Type: Newspaper
- Owner: News Corp Australia
- Editor: Nadja Fleet
- Language: English
- Headquarters: Maroochydore QLD 4558
- Website: sunshinecoastdaily.com.au

The Sunshine Coast Daily is an online newspaper specifically serving the Sunshine Coast region of Queensland, Australia. It is owned by News Corp Australia. It was originally founded as a print newspaper, however since 2020 the publication is only available in digital forms.

In 2008, the circulation of the Sunshine Coast Daily was 21,604 Monday to Friday and 34,716 on Saturday. In 2015, those figures were down to 12,200 Monday to Friday and just under 18,000 on Saturday.

There were also a number of community publications attached to the newspaper, the Caloundra Weekly, Maroochy Weekly, Nambour Weekly, and Buderim Chronicle. The Sunshine Coast Daily was also responsible for producing the Caboolture News, Noosa News, and Bribie Weekly. These had all been closed by News Limited by mid-2020.

== History ==
=== 1980-1988 Provincial Newspapers Queensland Ownership ===
On 7 July 1980, Provincial Newspapers Queensland used the presence it had been building up on the Sunshine Coast through the purchase of various weeklies in the 1970s, combined with the 1964 purchase of the Nambour Chronicle (another local Sunshine Coast newspaper) to launch a new publication, published from Maroochydore, the Sunshine Coast Daily. The Sunshine Coast Daily steadily became a strong performer, building its circulation to 21,052 by September 1992 in a region with a population of 125,000. It gave fierce competition to the long-established Brisbane daily, the Courier Mail. The success of the Sunshine Coast Daily acquisition was reflective in Provincial Newspaper Queensland's annual net profit. In 1985 its annual net profit increased from $1,919,000 in 1980 to $4,510,000. In 1987–88, its final year of operation as Provincial Newspaper's Queensland, profit was $4million.

=== 1999-2016 Australian Regional Media and 2016-present NewsCorp Ownership ===
In June 2016, the sale of Australian Regional Media to News Corp was approved by 99.94% of shareholders who voted, not including News Limited and its associated shareholders. In June 2016, Australian Regional Media was sold to News Corp Australia for $36.6 million.

=== NewsCorp Attempted Sale of Regional Newspapers 2020 ===
In May 2020, due to the already challenged regional newspaper sector suffering from significant declines in advertising spend before the COVID-19 crisis and even more significant advertising booking cancellations caused by the pandemic, NewsCorp Australia to enter discussions to sell their regional newspaper publication.

NewsCorp was in discussion with Australian Community Media to reach an agreement on the sale of the portfolio of more than 100 regional and community newspapers. However, on 12 May 2020, News Corp Australasia executive chairman Michael Miller said the talks with Australian Community Media had failed to result in a sale.

== Digitisation ==
On 28 May 2020, NewsCorp announced that there were to be significant job cuts to restructure the company towards the digitisation of regional newspapers. On 27 June 2020, the final print Sunshine Coast Daily was published. Many long-time local residents were disappointed in the action saying that the paper had been a “source of community connection for generations, documenting both small and large events in [people’s] lives”. Local publications including the Caloundra Weekly and Nambour Weekly ceased as part of this restructure.

As of 2020, The Sunshine Coast Daily has three major online platforms: website, app and digital edition.

=== Website ===
The website follows the same format as the former print version. All members of the public can access the titles and blurbs of the major news articles of the day on the website however access to the articles on the website are only accessible to people who purchase the unlimited digital access Sunshine Coast Daily subscription. The subscription rate is $1 a week for the first four weeks and $7 a week thereafter. This subscription allows users unlimited digital access on any device, access to apps and unrestricted digital access to the Courier Mail.

=== App ===
In September 2016, the Sunshine Coast Daily launched an app for readers to access major news stories online rather than in print. The app is available on both the Apple App Store and Google Play. It is compatible with ioS and Android. There have been multiple updates to the app since its production in 2016 which have allowed users to access the major articles of the day from their smart device.

=== Digital Edition ===
The Digital Edition of the Sunshine Coast Daily is an online flip book. It was launched in 2016 and aims to replicate the print version of the publication. When the digital edition was initially launched it was a four-page interactive digital edition highlighting major stories as they would have appeared in paper. As of July 2020, due to positive feedback from locals, the digital edition is sixteen pages and also features nation and world news, puzzles, horoscopes, shares, TV guides and cartoons.

== Organisation ==
The editor of the Sunshine Coast Daily is Nadja Fleet. She has been the Editor in Chief at the Sunshine Coast Daily since 2020 and currently resides on the Sunshine Coast.

== Headquarters ==
The Sunshine Coast Daily Headquarters were located in Maroochydore, Queensland on Newspaper Place and Dalton Drive. As of June 2020, due to the significant decline in revenue due to COVID-19, employees of the Sunshine Coast Daily were being moved out of the headquarters as it was announced that NewsCorp Australia were to lease the space.

== Circulation ==
The readership of the print Sunshine Coast Daily increased in the early 2000s to 2014. From 2014 to the introduction of the online-only paper, the news publication had seen a steady decline in readership.

The weekly Monday-Friday print Sunshine Coast Daily decreased from 45,000 to 42,000 from March 2014 to March 2015 and the readership of the weekend (Saturday) print Sunshine Coast Daily decreased from 46,000 to 37,000 from March 2014 to March 2015

The reasons for this decline in circulation is because of competition from other media and because newspapers represent a “mature” industry approaching its end. Furthermore, population declines, closure of major industries in regional areas and reductions in editorial space may have also contributed to the decline in readership.

== Controversies ==
A controversy faced by the Sunshine Coast Daily was the front-page sniper shot depiction targeted at Anastasia Palaszczuk in 2019. This dispute was taken to the Australian Press Council that concluded that the Sunshine Coast Daily apology and the fact that the publication removed the image from its digital platforms and published letters to the editor that were critical of the page resolved the issue.

== Reputation ==
The Sunshine Coast Daily has won the following awards:

Award	Journalist	Article	Date	Citation
Walkley Foundation	Tenille Bonoguore	N/A	2005	
PANPA Newspaper of the Year	N/A	N/A	2007	
PANPA Newspaper of the Year	N/A	N/A	2011	
Regional News Brand of the Year Finalist	N/A	N/A	2019	

== See also ==
- List of newspapers in Australia
