= Paul Gray (skier) =

Australian cross-country skier (born 1969)

Personal information
- Nationality: Australian
- Born: 12 August 1969 (age 55); Melbourne, Australia

Sport
- Sport: Cross-country skiing

Paul Gray (born 12 August 1969) is an Australian cross-country skier. He competed at the 1992 Winter Olympics and the 1998 Winter Olympics.
