= Adam Barclay =

Australian bobsledder (born 1970)

Personal information
- Nationality: Australian
- Born: 26 January 1970 (age 55); Madang, Papua New Guinea

Sport
- Sport: Bobsleigh

Adam Barclay (born 26 January 1970) is an Australian bobsledder. He competed at the 1994 Winter Olympics and the 1998 Winter Olympics.
