= Torres News =

Thursday Island newspaper, (Queensland, Australia)

- Type: Weekly newspaper
- Founder: G. Moloney
- Founded: 19 March 1957
- Ceased publication: 27 December 2015
- Headquarters: Thursday Island, Queensland

Torres News was a weekly newspaper published on Thursday Island, Queensland, Australia. Subtitled the Bulletin of Thursday Island and Torres Strait News, it was first published on 19 March 1957 by G. Moloney. The paper has been digitised as part of the Australian Newspapers Digitisation Program of the National Library of Australia.
