= Adrian Costa =

Australian freestyle skier

Personal information
- Born: 2 June 1972 (age 54)

Sport
- Country: Australia
- Sport: Freestyle skiing
Medal record
Representing Australia

Adrian Costa (born 2 June 1972) is an Australian freestyle skier, who represented Australia in four Winter Olympics in 1992, 1994, 1998 and 2002.

He competed in the men's moguls and placed 14th out of 47 in 1992. He came 14th out of 29 in 1994 and 21st of 30 in 1998. In his final event in 2002, he came 18th out of 30.
