= Scott Walker (bobsleigh) =

Australian bobsledder (born 1970)

Personal information
- Nationality: Australian
- Born: 6 August 1970 (age 55) Perth, Western Australia

Sport
- Sport: Bobsleigh

Scott Walker (born 6 August 1970) is an Australian bobsledder. He competed at the 1994 Winter Olympics and the 1998 Winter Olympics.
