= Ted Polglaze =

Australian bobsledder

Personal information
- Nationality: Australian
- Born: 3 May 1968 (age 56); Perth, Western Australia

Sport
- Sport: Bobsleigh

Ted Polglaze (born 3 May 1968) is an Australian bobsledder. He competed in the four man event at the 1998 Winter Olympics.
