= Cecilia McIntosh =

Australian athlete (born 1979)

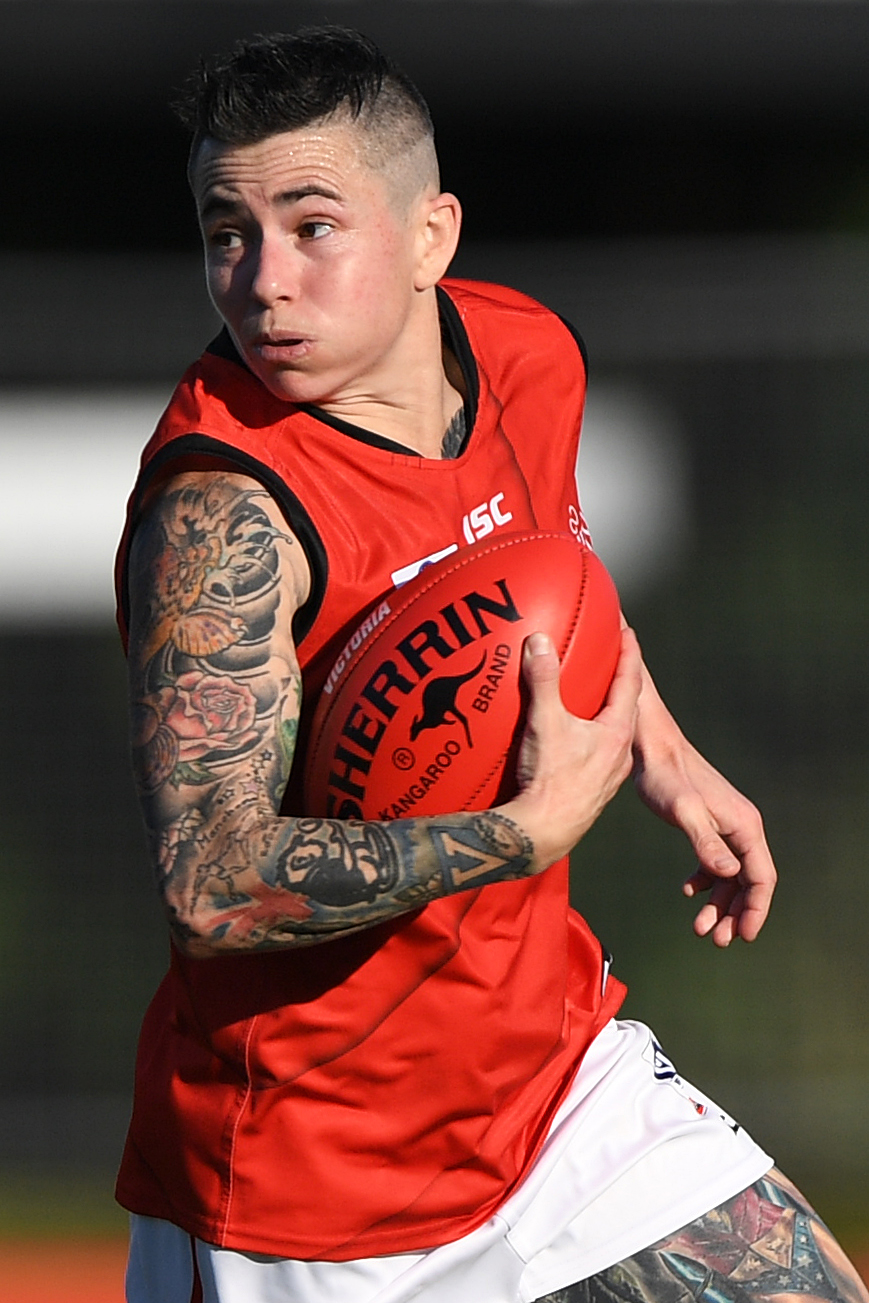
- McIntosh playing Australian rules football with Essendon VFLW in June 2019
- Born: 21 June 1979 (age 47)
- Height: 161 cm (5 ft 3 in)
Australian rules football career
Personal information
- Original team: Melbourne Uni (VFLW)
- Draft: No. 123, 2016 national draft
- Debut: Round 1, 2017, Collingwood vs. Carlton, at IKON Park
- Position: Defender
Playing career
Years	Club	Games (Goals)
2017–2019	Collingwood	17 (1)
Sports career
- Nickname: C-Bomb
- Country: Australia
- Sport: Track and field, bobsleigh, weightlifting and baseball
- Coached by: Gus Puopolo

Sports achievements and titles
- Olympic finals: 2010 Winter Olympics
Medal record
Women's athletics
Commonwealth Games
Silver medal – second place	2002 Manchester	Javelin throw

Cecilia McIntosh (born 21 June 1979) is an Australian athlete who won a silver medal in the javelin throw at the 2002 Commonwealth Games, represented Australia in bobsled at the 2010 Winter Olympics in Vancouver, was a runner-up at the 1997 Australian Weightlifting Championships and is an Australian rules footballer who played for the Collingwood Football Club in the AFL Women's competition (AFLW).

== Early life ==
McIntosh was born in Victoria, Australia and hails from the eastern Melbourne suburb of Nunawading. She attended Eumemmerring Secondary College in Fountain Gate, Melbourne.

== Athletics ==
McIntosh first stepped onto the world stage in 1996 for the World Junior Track & Field Championships in Sydney Australia placing 19th as a 17yo. Two years later in 1998 she qualified for her 2nd World Junior team to compete in Annecy, France where she went into the Championships ranked 4th with the hopes of finishing on the podium, but it wasn't to be as McIntosh snapped and dislocated her elbow on the first throw of the qualifying round. At the time not knowing how bad the injury was she continued to throw in all 3 rounds. Following straight after the World Juniors was the Commonwealth games Australian Qualifying Championships where Cecilia was the 3rd ranked Australian and because was still a junior athlete was highly enough ranked that if she could just make top 3 with a decent throw would have made her first Australian Commonwealth games team at the age of 19. But due to the seriousness of the elbow injury she endured at the worlds she could not compete and withdrew from the competition. On arrival back to Melbourne a few days later scans showed how bad an injury she had and went straight into surgery with Greg Hoy for an Elbow reconstruction.

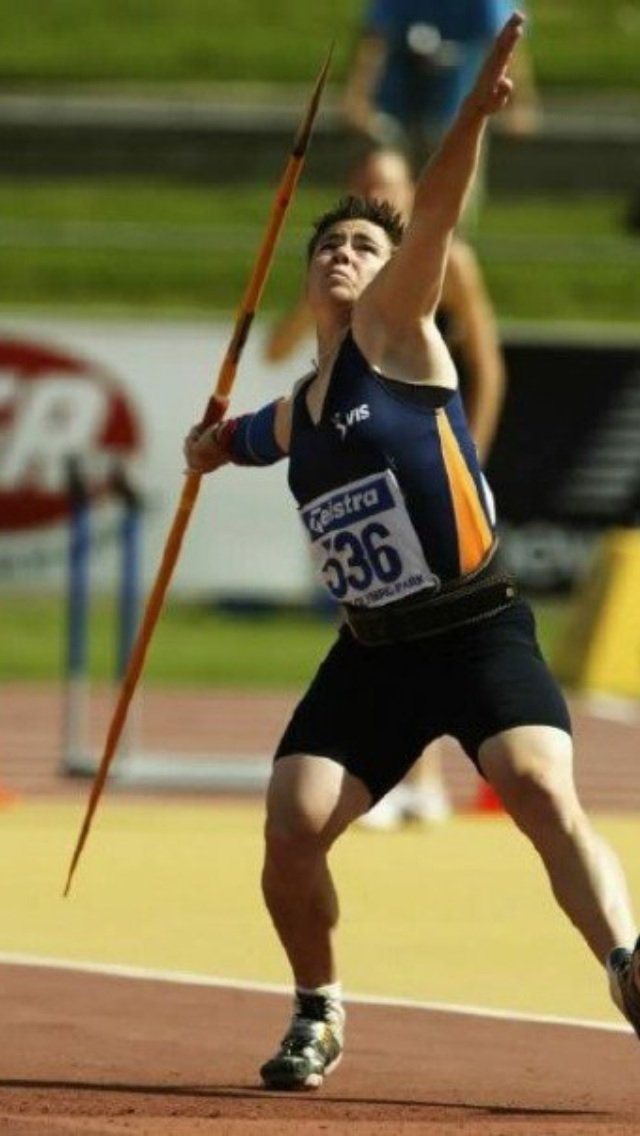
McIntosh competing in javelin during the Australian National Championships in August 2013

Planning to make a comeback for the Sydney Olympics McIntosh worked hard but was faced with some complications towards returning to competition meaning she wasn't able to get in good enough form before the Olympic trials. Sitting in the stands at the Sydney Olympic Games Cecilia vowed she would make it to the big stage. In the coming 2 years in the 2001/2002 seasons saw her take on a grueling schedule and train 6 days a week for a total of 10 sessions a week, this paid off as she went from being a 54m Javelin thrower to a 57m thrower and the new Australian National Open Champion. In a lead up meet to the Commonwealth Games McIntosh threw a Personal Best of 58.95m at a meet in Szombathy, Hungary to rank her 4th in the Commonwealth not 2 weeks out from the games. She competed at the 2002 Commonwealth Games in javelin where she won a silver medal, with a mark of 57.42. Five weeks after the games Cecilia competed at the World Cup in Madrid, Spain finishing 9th.

Following the World Cup McIntosh came home to have her shoulder checked out by Doctors after it had been giving her grief for 8 months leading into and during the games & World Cup. Scans showed McIntosh needed surgery but due to the fact that she was the only B qualifier for Australia for the upcoming 2004 Athens Olympic Games the surgeon Greg Hoy tried to do as little as possible to not hamper her preparations for the Olympics. But 3 months to go before Athens and the pain was too much and Cecilia just couldn't get a decent pre-departure throw out and needed to go back into surgery for a full shoulder reconstruction meaning she would miss the 2004 Olympic Games. Ten months later saw her have more complications with the shoulder forcing her to go in for surgery yet again. Trying desperately hard to return to her best and qualify for the 2006 Melbourne, Australia Commonwealth Games Cecilia just couldn't get over the shoulder injury that had plagued her for 4 years. She then left the sport because of the problems with her shoulder.

== Australian rules football ==
Following her retirement from athletics, McIntosh took up Australian rules football. She played for the Melbourne University Mugars in the Victorian Women's Football League. In 2007, her first season in the league, she earned the best first year player award while playing 15 games. Early on, she played in a defensive role before moving up to the forward line where she scored 31 goals. In 2008, she earned the league's best-and-fairest award. In 2009, she was named to the All Australian team. On 20 April 2015 McIntosh was drafted to Melbourne FC. In the first of the 2 exhibition matches for 2015 McIntosh tore her ACL on the MCG at the 14-minute mark of the first quarter and would take no further part in the game. Having had Julian Feller reconstruct the knee 3 weeks later, McIntosh was back at training straight after surgery in a well documented series of Road to Recovery videos. 10 and a half months later on 1 May 2016 McIntosh played her first game back for her VFL club Melbourne University in a match winning performance. Four days on she received a call from Michelle Cowan (Melbourne FC Women's Coach) welcoming her back to the Melbourne FC team and in her first game back for the Melbourne Demons 3 weeks later on the same ground she tore her ACL almost exactly 12 months to the day McIntosh had a field day off the half back line. McIntosh later played for the Melbourne side in the Women's All-Star match at Whitten Oval in September 2016.

=== AFL Women's ===
McIntosh was drafted by Collingwood with the 123rd pick in the 2016 AFL Women's draft. She made her AFLW debut in round 1, 2017, in the club and the league's inaugural match at IKON Park against Carlton. In May 2017, Collingwood signed her for the 2018 season. In May 2018, McIntosh was re-signed by Collingwood for the 2019 season. At the end of the 2019 season, McIntosh retired from AFLW following three seasons at Collingwood that included 17 matches.

She continued to play state-league football, moving to play with Essendon in the VFL Women's league in 2019, and came third in the league best and fairest Lambert–Pearce Medal that year.

=== Statistics ===
Legend
G	Goals	K	Kicks	D	Disposals	T	Tackles
B	Behinds	H	Handballs	M	Marks

Season	Team	No.	Games	Totals							Averages (per game)						
Season	Team	No.	Games	G	B	K	H	D	M	T	G	B	K	H	D	M	T
2017	Collingwood	20	6	1	0	21	17	38	6	17	0.2	0.0	3.5	2.8	6.3	1.0	2.8
2018	Collingwood	20	7	0	0	31	28	59	11	19	0.0	0.0	4.4	4.0	8.4	1.6	2.7
2019	Collingwood	20	4	0	0	12	12	24	2	15	0.0	0.0	3.0	3.0	6.0	0.5	3.8
Career			17	1	0	64	57	121	19	51	0.1	0.0	3.8	3.4	7.1	1.1	3.0

== Weightlifting ==
McIntosh has competed in weightlifting, where she finished second at the Victorian championships and second at the national championships. In 1997, she won the U20 (under 20) division at the Australian Weightlifting Championships, and finished second in the open division.

== Bobsleigh ==
She first tried bobsledding following her retirement from athletics at the suggest of athletics club teammate and 2006 Winter Olympics bobsledder Shane McKenzie. She was coached by Gus Puopolo. In 2009, she took up the sport again, moved to the United States and trained full-time in preparation for the 2010 Winter Olympics. She is her sled's brakeman. When in Australia, she based her training in Ringwood, Melbourne.

At the 2009 America's Cup in Lake Placid, her 2-man sled finished second. At the Calgary hosted 2009 Americas Cup, she finished fourth in the 2-man bobsleigh. Competing at the 2009 America's Cup in Park City, Utah, she had two second-place finishes and a third-place finish. At the 2010 European Cup in Cesana, Italy, her 2-man sled finished sixth. McIntosh and Astrid Loch-Wilkinson had to appeal to the Court of Arbitration for Sport in order to gain the right to compete at the 2010 Winter Olympics because the International Bobsleigh and Skeleton Federation had not allocated a spot for Oceania during the qualification process.

Following the first two heats of the women's two person bobsleigh event, her sled was in nineteenth place out of twenty-one sleds. The first run had a time of 54.85 seconds and the second run had a time of 54.66 seconds. Despite finishing 21st after their third run, their sled finished nineteenth overall at the conclusion of their fourth and final run, after one team failed to finish and another was disqualified.
