= Les Herstik =

Australian speed skier (born 1963)

Leslie Herstik
Personal information
- Nationality: Australian
- Born: 25 August 1963 (age 61)

Sport
- Sport: Speed skiing

Leslie Herstik (born 25 August 1963) is an Australian speed skier. He competed at the 1992 Winter Olympics in the demonstration sport of Speed skiing with a run of 183.299 km/h (113.897 mph)
