= Emily Thomas (snowboarder) =

Australian snowboarder (born 1973)

Emily Thomas (born 19 July 1973) is an Australian snowboarder. At the 2006 Winter Olympics in Turin, she competed in the snowboard cross, placed 19th and 21st in her two qualifying runs to finish 21st out of 23 competitors, and did not qualify for the final.
