= Maria Despas =

Australian freestyle skier

Personal information
- Nationality: Australian
- Born: 3 May 1967 (age 59) Sydney, Australia

Sport
- Country: Australia
- Sport: Freestyle skiing
Medal record
Women's freestyle skiing
Representing Australia
World Championships
Silver medal – second place	2001 Whistler-Blackcomb	Moguls

Maria Despas (born 3 May 1967) is an Australian freestyle skier. She was born in Sydney. She competed at the 1998 and 2002 Winter Olympics, in women's moguls.
