= Janet Daly =

Australian speed skater

Personal information
- Nationality: Australian
- Born: 12 January 1969 (age 56); Brisbane, Australia

Sport
- Sport: Short track speed skating

Janet Daly (born 12 January 1969) is an Australian short track speed skater. She competed in two events at the 1998 Winter Olympics.
