= Jason Giobbi =

Australian bobsledder

Personal information
- Nationality: Australian
- Born: 16 September 1968 (age 57) Broken Hill, New South Wales, Australia

Sport
- Sport: Bobsleigh

Jason Giobbi (born 16 September 1968) is an Australian former bobsledder. He competed in the two man and the four man events at the 1998 Winter Olympics.
