= Jeremy Rolleston =

Australian bobsledder

Jeremy Rolleston (born 13 December 1972) is an Australian sportsman who played rugby professionally before changing to bobsleigh. He competed for Australia from 1999 to 2006, then returned in 2008 to prepare to compete in the 2010 Winter Olympics. Competing in two Winter Olympics, he finished 22nd in the two-man event at the 2006 Winter Olympics in Turin.

Rolleston also finished 31st in the two-man event at the FIBT World Championships 2005 in Calgary.

He is the author of "A Life That Counts".
