= Anthony Ryan (bobsleigh) =

Australian bobsledder (born 1980)

Anthony Ryan (born 7 April 1980) is an Australian bobsledder who has competed since 2009. He finished 22nd in the two-man event at the 2010 Winter Olympics in Vancouver.

Ryan's best finish was second in a lesser event in the two-man event at Park City, Utah in November 2009.
