= Short-track speed skating at the 2022 Winter Olympics =

Short track speed skating at the XXIV Olympic Winter Games
- Short track speed skating pictogram
- Venue: Capital Indoor Stadium
- Dates: 5–16 February 2022
- No. of events: 9 (4 men, 4 women, 1 mixed)
- Competitors: 112 from 23 nations (58 men and 54 women)

Short track speed skating at the 2022 Winter Olympics was held at the Capital Indoor Stadium in Beijing, China. The events took place between 5 and 16 February 2022. A total of nine short track speed skating events were held.

In July 2018, the International Olympic Committee (IOC) officially added the mixed relay held over a distance of 2000 metres, increasing the total number of events to nine. Due to the addition of the event, the competition schedule was increased to six days from five.

A total of 112 quota spots (56 per gender) were distributed to the sport, a decline of eight from the 2018 Winter Olympics. A total of nine events were contested, four for men, four for women and one mixed.

== Qualification ==
A total quota of 112 athletes were scheduled to compete (56 men and 56 women). Countries were assigned quotas using the results of the entire 2020–21 World Cup in the autumn of 2021. Each nation was permitted to enter a maximum of five athletes per gender if it qualified a relay team and three if it did not. There were a maximum of thirty-two qualifiers for the 500m and 1000m events; thirty-six for the 1500m events; eight for the single gender relays, and 12 for the mixed relay. At the end of qualification, the International Skating Union confirmed 58 men and 54 women earned quota spots, which meant two quota spots were transferred from women to men.

== Competition schedule ==
The following was the competition schedule for all nine events. Sessions that included the event finals are shown in bold.

All times are (UTC+8).

Date	Time	Event
5 February	19:00	Women's 500 metres
5 February	19:00	Men's 1000 metres
5 February	19:00	**Mixed team relay**
7 February	19:30	**Women's 500 metres**
7 February	19:30	**Men's 1000 metres**
9 February	19:00	**Men's 1500 metres**
9 February	19:00	Women's 1000 metres
9 February	19:00	Women's 3000 metre relay
11 February	19:00	**Women's 1000 metres**
11 February	19:00	Men's 500 metres
11 February	19:00	Men's 5000 metre relay
13 February	19:00	**Men's 500 metres**
13 February	19:00	**Women's 3000 metre relay**
16 February	19:30	**Women's 1500 metres**
16 February	19:30	**Men's 5000 metre relay**

== Medal summary ==
=== Medal table ===
* Host nation (China)

Rank	Nation	Gold	Silver	Bronze	Total
1	South Korea	2	3	0	5
2	China*	2	1	1	4
2	Netherlands	2	1	1	4
4	Italy	1	2	1	4
5	Canada	1	1	2	4
6	Hungary	1	0	2	3
7	ROC	0	1	1	2
8	Belgium	0	0	1	1
Totals (8 entries)		**9**	**9**	**9**	**27**

=== Men's events ===
Event	Gold		Silver		Bronze	
500 metres	Shaoang Liu; Hungary	40.338	Konstantin Ivliev; ROC	40.431	Steven Dubois; Canada	40.669
1000 metres	Ren Ziwei; China	1:26.768	Li Wenlong; China	1:29.917	Shaoang Liu; Hungary	1:35.693
1500 metres	Hwang Dae-heon; South Korea	2:09.219	Steven Dubois; Canada	2:09.254	Semion Elistratov; ROC	2:09.267
5000 metre relay	Canada; Charles Hamelin; Steven Dubois; Jordan Pierre-Gilles; Pascal Dion; Maxime Laoun^{[a]}	6:41.257	South Korea; Lee June-seo; Hwang Dae-heon; Kwak Yoon-gy; Park Jang-hyuk; Kim Dong-wook^{[a]}	6:41.679	Italy; Pietro Sighel; Yuri Confortola; Tommaso Dotti; Andrea Cassinelli	6:43.431

=== Women's events ===
Event	Gold		Silver		Bronze	
500 metres	Arianna Fontana; Italy	42.488	Suzanne Schulting; Netherlands	42.559	Kim Boutin; Canada	42.724
1000 metres	Suzanne Schulting; Netherlands	1:28.391	Choi Min-jeong; South Korea	1:28.443	Hanne Desmet; Belgium	1:28.928
1500 metres	Choi Min-jeong; South Korea	2:17.789	Arianna Fontana; Italy	2:17.862	Suzanne Schulting; Netherlands	2:17.865
3000 metre relay	Netherlands; Suzanne Schulting; Selma Poutsma; Xandra Velzeboer; Yara van Kerkhof	4:03.409	South Korea; Seo Whi-min; Choi Min-jeong; Kim A-lang; Lee Yu-bin	4:03.627	China; Qu Chunyu; Zhang Chutong; Fan Kexin; Zhang Yuting; Han Yutong^{[a]}	4:03.863

=== Mixed event ===
Event	Gold		Silver		Bronze	
2000 metre relay	China; Qu Chunyu; Fan Kexin; Wu Dajing; Ren Ziwei; Zhang Yuting^{[a]}	2:37.348	Italy; Arianna Fontana; Martina Valcepina; Pietro Sighel; Andrea Cassinelli; Arianna Valcepina^{[a]} Yuri Confortola^{[a]}	2:37.364	Hungary; Petra Jászapáti; Zsófia Kónya; Shaoang Liu; Shaolin Sándor Liu; John-Henry Krueger^{[a]}	2:40.900

^{a} Skaters who did not participate in the final, but received medals.

== Records ==
World records (WR) and Olympic records (OR) set during the competition.

Event	Date	Round	Athlete	Country	Time	Record	Ref
Women's 500 metres	5 February	Heat 4	Suzanne Schulting	Netherlands	42.379	**OR**	
Men's 1000 metres	5 February	Heat 5	Hwang Dae-heon	South Korea	1:23.042	**OR**	
Mixed 2000 metre relay	5 February	Heat 2	Suzanne Schulting; Xandra Velzeboer; Itzhak de Laat; Jens van 't Wout	Netherlands	2:36.437	**OR**	
Women's 1000 metres	9 February	Heat 2	Suzanne Schulting	Netherlands	1:27.292	**OR**	
Men's 1500 metres	9 February	Quarterfinal 1	Shaolin Sándor Liu	Hungary	2:09.213	**OR**	
Women's 1000 metres	11 February	Quarterfinal 1	Suzanne Schulting	Netherlands	1:26.514	**WR**, **OR**	
Women's 3000 metre relay	13 February	Final A	Suzanne Schulting; Selma Poutsma; Xandra Velzeboer; Yara van Kerkhof	Netherlands	4:03.409	**OR**	
Women's 1500 metres	16 February	Semifinal 3	Choi Min-jeong	South Korea	2:16.831	**OR**	

== Participating nations ==
A total of 112 athletes from 22 nations (including the IOC's designation of ROC for the Russian Olympic Committee) qualified to participate. Turkey made its debut in the sport at these Winter Olympics.

The numbers in parentheses represents the number of participants entered.

- Australia (1)
- Belgium (2)
- Canada (10)
- China (10)
- Croatia (1)
- Czech Republic (1)
- France (4)
- Germany (1)
- Great Britain (3)
- Hong Kong (1)
- Hungary (7)
- Israel (1)
- Italy (10)
- Japan (7)
- Latvia (2)
- Netherlands (10)
- Poland (6)
- ROC (10)
- South Korea (10)
- Turkey (1)
- Ukraine (2)
- United States (7)

== Controversy ==
The Men's 1000 meters event was marred by controversy. During the semifinals, Hwang Dae-heon of South Korea was disqualified for an "illegal late pass causing contact", and Lee June-seo of South Korea were penalized for a lane change that caused contact, allowing Li Wenlong from China to qualify for the A final joining two countrymen. Then, after the conclusion of the A final, Shaolin Sandor Liu of Hungary was disqualified for a "straight lane change from inside to out causing contact” and an “arm block at the finish", resulting in Ren Ziwei and Li from China being awarded the gold and silver medals respectively The International Skating Union received and rejected two protests from Hungary and South Korea on February 7, 2022. The International Skating Union stated that they reviewed the incident with the Video Referee and rejected the protests, standing by the original decisions made by the Chief Referee.

Australian former Olympic gold medalist Steven Bradbury said, "nothing could be more favorable for the Chinese team with the judges than what’s happened tonight here in Beijing". While Stephen Gough, head coach of the U.S. team, stated that he did not believe that the Chinese team should have been penalized.

However, the Korean Sport & Olympic Committee later filed an official appeal with the Court of Arbitration for Sport over the disqualification of two of the South Korean athletes from the men's 1000 metres speedskating event semifinals.

During the 5000 metres relay event, in the semifinals of the event, the Chinese team fell with 10 laps to go. There was no obvious obstruction on the Chinese skater, but they were advanced to the A final, with no team disqualified during the race. The Chinese team were advanced, even though they finished last in the race and there was no impeding action on the team.
