= Concerns and controversies at the 2022 Winter Olympics =

The 2022 Winter Olympics took place between the 4 and 20 February 2022 and were hosted by in China in the capital city of Beijing. The country selected was the subject of various concerns and controversies about their cost, environmental impact, censorship, espionage, COVID-19, sportswashing, and human rights issues.

There have been diplomatic boycotts of the Olympics largely due to the human rights situation in China, and the persecution of Uyghurs in China in particular. Additional reasons for diplomatic boycotts include China's alleged politicization of the games.

== Criticism of host selection ==
American sportscaster Bob Costas criticized the International Olympic Committee's (IOC) decision to award the games to China saying "The IOC deserves all of the disdain and disgust that comes their way for going back to China yet again" referencing China's human rights record.

After winning two gold medals and returning to his home country of Sweden skater Nils van der Poel criticized the IOC's selection of China as the host saying "I think it is extremely irresponsible to give it to a country that violates human rights as blatantly as the Chinese regime is doing." He had declined to criticize China before leaving for the games saying "I don't think it would be particularly wise for me to criticize the system I'm about to transition to, if I want to live a long and productive life."

== Organizing concerns and controversies ==
=== Cost and climate ===
Several cities withdrew their applications during the bidding process, citing the high costs or the lack of local support to host the 2022 games, leaving Almaty in Kazakhstan and Beijing as the only candidate cities by 1 October 2014.

The decision to bid for the Olympics was controversial in China (and outside), because Beijing itself, and especially some of the proposed outdoor venues, would not have reliable snowfall in winter for snow sports. Concerns have been raised that snow may need to be transported to the venues at great cost and with uncertain environmental consequences.

=== Promotional song ===
Some commentators alleged that one of the early promotional songs for the 2022 Winter Olympics, "The Snow and Ice Dance", sung by Sun Nan and Tan Jing, had suspicious similarities with "Let It Go", one of the songs from the 2013 Disney film, Frozen. A Chinese media outlet cited technical analysis of the two songs: both songs employ a piano as the major instrument, have similar prelude chords and an eight-beat introduction, and they run at almost exactly the same tempo.

== Diplomatic boycotts or non-attendance ==
Countries and regions that announced a diplomatic boycott of the 2022 Winter Olympics

Several countries declined to send any diplomats or official representatives to the games. The following countries have either specifically called their non-attendance a "boycott" or have explicitly stated that their non-attendance is due to human rights concerns:

- Australia
- Belgium
- Canada
- Denmark
- Estonia
- India
- Kosovo
- Lithuania
- United Kingdom
- United States

The following countries and regions also did not send any official representatives, but stated that their non-attendance was due to the COVID-19 pandemic or explicitly denied that they considered their non-attendance to be a diplomatic boycott:

- Austria
- Czech Republic
- Germany
- Hong Kong
- Japan
- Latvia
- Netherlands
- New Zealand
- Norway
- Slovenia
- Sweden
- Switzerland

Specifically:

- Austria, Hong Kong, Norway, the Netherlands, New Zealand, Slovenia, Sweden, and Switzerland have stated that their non-attendance is due to the pandemic.
- Various Czech politicians have publicly disagreed on whether they consider the Czech position to be a boycott, due to the attendance of Czech ambassador to Beijing Vladimír Tomšík.
- Germany has cited both the pandemic and the Peng Shuai case, but also stated that a diplomatic boycott would be "ineffective".
- Japan has explicitly denied that they consider their position to be a boycott.
- Latvia's president and cabinet refused to attend the games, officially due to "various circumstances including COVID-19 restrictions", but also explicitly denied that their position was a boycott and sent Latvian ambassador to China Maija Manika.
- North Korea also stated that they would not attend the games due to the pandemic; however due to the suspension of their NOC, their officials would not have been permitted to attend regardless.

=== Background ===
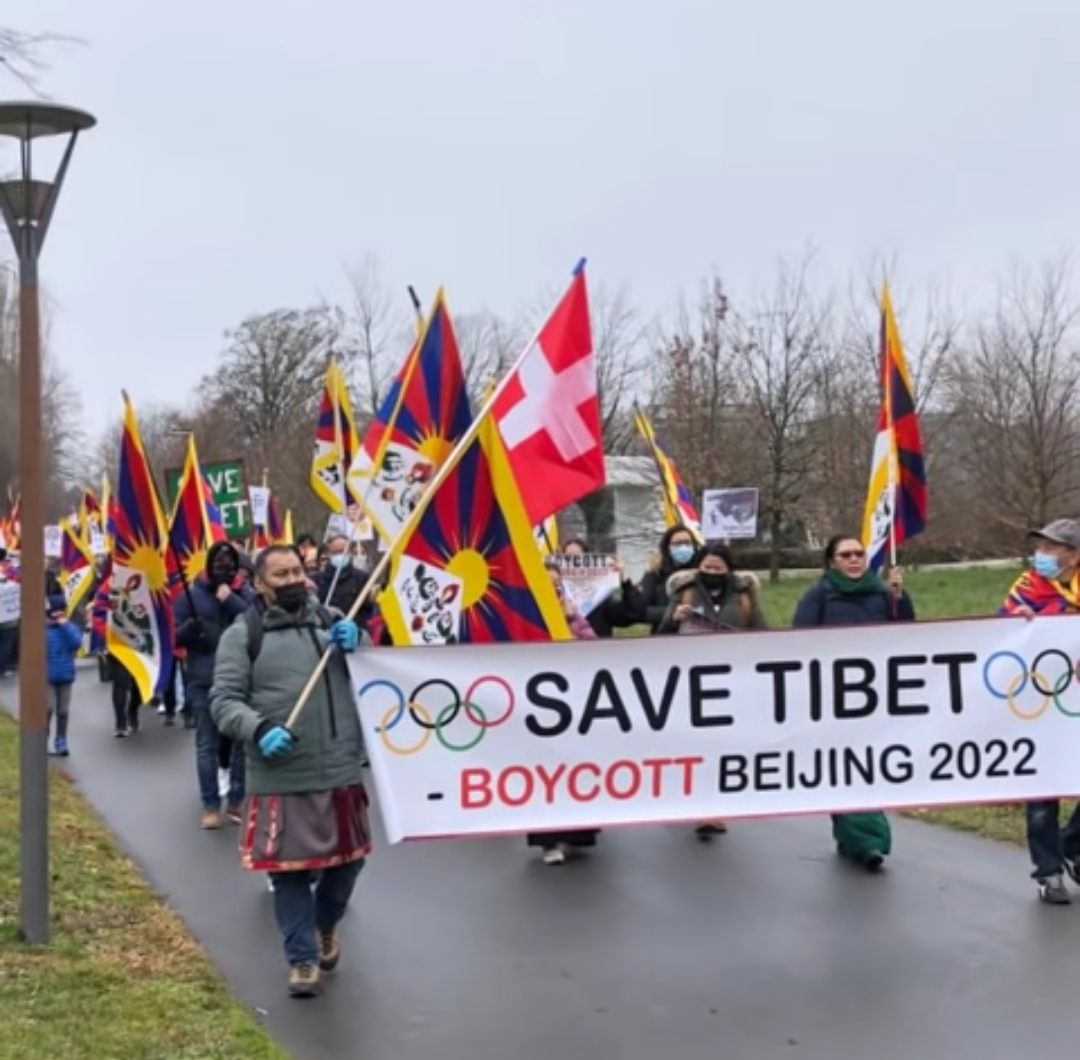
Protests against Chinese Winter Olympics held in Lausanne, Switzerland

After China had won the bid to host the 2022 Olympics, many Tibetan protesters had criticized the IOC for allowing China to host the games again due to its policies against Tibetans. In the aftermath of the 2019 leak of the Xinjiang papers, the 2019–20 Hong Kong protests, China's hostage diplomacy and the alleged persecution of Uyghurs in China, calls were made for a boycott of the 2022 Games. In November 2021 the disappearance of former Olympian Peng Shuai after she made allegations of sexual assault against Zhang Gaoli, former Vice Premier of China and a high ranking Chinese Communist Party (CCP) member, has put pressure on the International Olympic Committee.

Some human rights organizations have called for a diplomatic boycott that would mean countries not sending their heads of state or high-ranking officials to the Olympics but still sending athletes. In a 30 July 2020 letter, the World Uyghur Congress urged the IOC to reconsider holding the 2022 Winter Olympics in Beijing because of the Uyghur genocide. The World Uyghur Congress does not support a full boycott; instead, they want athletes to use the games as a chance to raise awareness about the Uyghur genocide, similar to the way that athletes have raised the profile of the Black Lives Matter movement. The IOC met with activists in late 2020 about their request to move the Olympics. In March 2021, the IOC president Thomas Bach opposed a boycott, which would also damage the IOC image and finances, and said that the IOC must stay out of politics. On 14 October 2021, the executive vice-president of the IOC, John Coates, said that the IOC would not challenge the Chinese government over the issue of the Uyghurs, stating that it was "not within the IOC's remit".

On 23 June 2021 (Olympic Day), multiple Tibetan, Uyghur, Hongkonger, Chinese, Taiwanese and Inner Mongolia representatives staged protests in 50 cities worldwide, calling for a mass boycott.

On 7 September 2021, human rights groups called on Olympics broadcasters, including NBC, to cancel the broadcasting plans for 2022 Olympics due to China's human rights issue.

In January 2022, it was reported that the United States is considering legislation to strip the IOC of its federal tax-exempt status in response to the IOC's "refusal to challenge China on human rights abuses".

More than 200 human rights organizations have voiced support for a boycott of the games. Groups protesting the games have called them the "Genocide Games."

=== United States ===
In October 2018, Senator Marco Rubio, on behalf of the U.S. Congressional-Executive Commission on China, asked that China be deprived of the hosting rights for the 2022 Olympics due to the "dire human rights situation" there. In September 2020, United States Senator Rick Scott spoke with the IOC Vice President about reconsidering the IOC's decision to host the 2022 Winter Olympics in China. On 25 February 2021, U.S. Representative John Katko stated that China is "a country that's engaged in genocide" and called upon the United States to boycott participation in the 2022 Winter Olympics. In March 2021, Senator Mitt Romney called for an "economic and diplomatic boycott" of the 2022 Winter Olympics, in which U.S. athletes would still participate, but no American spectators or dignitaries would attend. In May 2021, Speaker of the House Nancy Pelosi called for a diplomatic boycott and said heads of state should not "honor China" by attending the Olympic Games. In July 2021, the Congressional-Executive Commission on China called on the IOC to relocate or postpone the games.

In April 2021, it was reported that the Biden administration was "not discussing any joint boycott with allies and partners."

In a survey taken in August 2021, 49 per cent of Americans believe that China's human rights record should prevent it from hosting the winter Olympics in 2022 and 33 per cent are not sure.

On 18 November 2021, President Joe Biden said the U.S. is "considering" a diplomatic boycott of the 2022 Winter Olympics in Beijing. Some, like US senator Tom Cotton, called for a full boycott of the games, which would bar U.S. athletes from competing and bar U.S. companies from sponsoring the games. Due to a change in the last version of the Olympic Charter, a full boycott by the United States, like the one at the 1980 Summer Olympics, could result in the most severe punishment, which is the suspension by the National Olympic Committee for 2 years of the Olympic Games, a similar situation to what happened with North Korea in the 2020 games.

On 6 December 2021, White House Press Secretary, Jen Psaki, announced that the Biden administration would initiate a diplomatic boycott of the 2022 Winter Olympics and the 2022 Winter Paralympics. The diplomatic boycott would bar all US government officials from attending the games in an official capacity. The White House cited China's mistreatment of the Uyghur people as the reason for the boycott. The White House said it stopped short of a full boycott, because "it would not be fair to punish athletes who have trained for years".

On 27 December 2021, the Chinese foreign ministry said it has received visa applications for 18 US officials to attend the games. The US said that the visa applications were consistent with its diplomatic boycott as the applicants would only be providing "consular and diplomatic security services" to its athletes.

=== Australia ===
China's alleged use of coercive diplomacy against Australia has led to increased calls within Australia to boycott the 2022 Winter Olympics. In November 2020, Australian Senators Jacqui Lambie and Rex Patrick officially proposed a boycott, but their proposal was voted down. Australia has decided that no Australian based politician or officials will be attending the games, and Canberra has also refused to sign the Olympic Truce for the 2022 Winter Olympics.

On 7 December 2021, Australian Prime Minister Scott Morrison stated that Australia would join with the United States in the diplomatic boycott of the 2022 games. He stated that it was "human rights abuses," referencing the ongoing genocide of Uyghur Muslims in China's Xinjiang region, as well as "many other issues that Australia has consistently raised". He went on to state that it was "no surprise" that Canberra would do this following consistent deterioration of relations between Canberra and Beijing. Morrison also stated that the decision was "in Australia's national interest," and that it is the "right thing to do."

=== India ===
After it was revealed that People's Liberation Army regimental commander Qi Fabao, who led the Chinese troops during skirmishes against Indian troops during the 2020 Galwan Valley clash, would be one of the torchbearers during the opening ceremony of the games, Indian Ministry of External Affairs spokesperson Arindam Bagchi stated: "It is indeed regrettable that the Chinese side has chosen to politicize an event like the Olympics". Bagchi also stated that the chargé d'affaires of the Embassy of India in Beijing will not attend the opening or closing ceremony of the Winter Olympics. The CEO of Prasar Bharati, India's public broadcaster, announced that they will not air the 2022 Winter Olympics opening and closing ceremony.

Qi Fabao had been captured in June 2020 by Indian forces when he tried to mount an attack on Indian forces in the Galwan Valley, according to an investigative report by the Australian newspaper The Klaxon. According to the report, 38 Chinese troops drowned in the early stages of the 15–16 June face-off between Indian and Chinese forces while attempting to cross the Galwan River at Line of Actual Control in the dark. The Chinese government accepted four casualties.

=== Calls for boycotts by other countries ===
In a non-binding motion in February 2021, the Canadian House of Commons called for the IOC to move the Olympics to a new location. In a nationwide survey conducted in March 2021, 54% of Canadians said the country should boycott the 2022 Winter Olympics in Beijing, while 24% believed it should not and 21% were not sure.

In July 2021, the European Parliament and the Parliament of the United Kingdom voted in favor of a diplomatic boycott of the 2022 Winter Olympics.

On 19 November 2021, 17 members of the Lithuanian national parliament Seimas released an official letter encouraging Lithuania to withdraw from the 2022 Olympics due human rights violations in China. Daina Gudzinevičiūtė, president of National Olympic Committee of Lithuania, released a statement that Olympic games should be politically neutral and confirmed that committee has no plans to boycott the games. Lithuania's president, Gitanas Nauseda, released a statement confirming the Lithuanian diplomatic boycott on 3 December 2021. This was due to concerns of human rights abuses in China.

On 8 December 2021, the United Kingdom and Canada joined the United States and Australia, whom both announced diplomatic boycotts of the 2022 Winter Olympics.

In December 2021, the government of Latvia announced that it would not send diplomats to the games.

In January 2022, the governments of Sweden, Denmark, and the Netherlands separately announced that they will not send diplomats to the games.

=== Chinese Government response ===
In February 2021, the Chinese Communist Party-owned tabloid Global Times warned that China could "seriously sanction any country that follows a boycott." In March 2021, Chinese spokesperson Guo Weimin stated that any attempt to boycott the Olympics would be doomed to fail. Chinese Foreign Minister Wang Yi also told the EU's foreign policy chief Josep Borrell that they should attend the games to "enhance exchanges on winter sport," and to "foster new highlights" in bilateral cooperation.

On 29 November 2021, Chinese media reported that China reportedly does not plan to invite Western politicians who threaten a diplomatic boycott to the Beijing Winter Olympics.

=== IOC response ===
The IOC has stated that the diplomatic boycotts are "a purely political decision for each government, which the IOC in its political neutrality fully respects." It has also stated that the award of hosting the games does not signal agreement with the host country's political or social situation or its human rights standards. When prompted by Agence France-Presse, the IOC responded: "We've repeatedly said it: the IOC isn't responsible for the government. It only gives the rights and opportunity for the staging of the Olympic Games. That doesn't mean we agree with all the politics, all the social or human rights issues in the country. And it doesn't mean we approve of all the human rights violations of a person or people." This position has generated criticism, with Jules Boykoff accusing the IOC of hypocrisy by saying that it ignores its charter that promotes equality and anti-discrimination when it is convenient to do so and that the IOC has shown an "unfortunate propensity for turning away from human rights atrocities to make sure that the games go on."

On 8 September 2021, after the IOC suspended the North Korean NOC for not being present at the 2020 Summer Olympics, there was speculation about whether the IOC was also intending to send a message to nations considering a boycott of the games that they could be banned from participation in future Olympic Games if they chose to boycott this edition. On 14 October 2021, the executive vice-president of the IOC, Australian John Coates, said that the IOC would not challenge the Chinese government over the issue of the Uyghurs, stating that it was "not within the IOC's remit".

However, during the opening ceremony, IOC president, Thomas Bach had called for the end of various types of discrimination during his speech indirectly referring to the human rights abuses in China. On 17 February 2022 towards the end of the Games, when a BOCOG spokesperson referred to questions about Xinjiang as "lies", the IOC reminded BOCOG to remain politically neutral.

== Athletes and team officials complaints ==
Athletes participating have said, the games "are not living up to the hype — especially considering how China promised the world a "streamlined, safe and most splendid Games." Team officials from delegations including Belgium, Germany and the Russian Olympic Committee have all brought up issues facing their athletes in quarantine hotels, among them no internet, low-quality food, insufficient facilities and no training equipment.

=== Quarantine facilities ===
Polish short track speed skater Natalia Maliszewska posted on Twitter, "I don't believe in anything anymore. In no tests. No games. It's a big joke for me" after a series of mistakes by Chinese officials conducting COVID-19 tests on her. Meanwhile, Finnish men's ice hockey team's coach Jukka Jalonen accused China of not respecting the human rights of athlete Marko Anttila, who had not received food and was under a lot of stress while in quarantine.

On February 2, Belgian skeleton athlete Kim Meylemans posted on social media and was in tears about the conditions she faced while in quarantine. Meylemans was supposed to be transported to the village after her time in quarantine was over, but was transported to a different quarantine facility instead. After the video was posted, Belgian Olympic team officials and the International Olympic Committee had to intervene, and Meylemans was moved to the Athletes Village in Yanqing. Moreover, Dirk Schimmelpfennig, Germany's chef de mission called the hotel accommodations provided for Olympic gold medalist in Nordic Combined Eric Frenzel as "unreasonable".

=== Food ===
The food being served at the games was also criticized. During the men's downhill event in alpine skiing, German coach Christian Schweiger said the following, "the catering is extremely questionable. I would have expected that the Olympic Committee is capable of providing hot meals, there are crisps, some nuts and chocolate and nothing else. This shows a lack of focus on high-performance sport". Also, Russian Olympic Committee biathlete Valeria Vasnetsova posted on social media that she was served the same food for all three meals and posted "My stomach hurts, I'm very pale and I have huge black circles around my eyes". Vasnetsova said she was only able to eat the pasta served as the rest of the food was inedible. The United States delegation brought extra food, such as bags of pasta, anticipating issues with the food at the games. Also, a manager from a restaurant in the "bubble" for the games admitted the food served there was "disgusting" and only low quality packaged food items were available at the Main Media Centre. The International Olympic Committee would release a statement acknowledging the issues raised by athletes, "particularly with regard to food temperature, variety and portion size".

=== Weather conditions ===
Other complaints included the weather conditions at the games, with athletes raising complaints about competing in unsafe weather conditions. The Swedish team requested the races be moved to earlier in the day to protect athletes from the cold weather. This was done after athlete Frida Karlsson nearly fainted at the conclusion of the women's skiathlon cross-country race. Some athletes resorted to putting tape on their faces and noses to protect them from the bitter cold.

== Team Russia ==
On 9 December 2019, the World Anti-Doping Agency (WADA) banned Russia from all international sport for a period of four years, after the Russian government was found to have tampered with lab data that it provided to WADA in January 2019 as a condition of the Russian Anti-Doping Agency being reinstated. As a result of the ban, WADA will allow individually cleared Russian athletes to take part in the 2022 Winter Olympics under a neutral banner, as instigated at the 2018 Winter Olympics. The title of the neutral banner was yet to be determined; WADA Compliance Review Committee head Jonathan Taylor stated that the IOC would not be able to use "Olympic Athletes from Russia" (OAR) as it did in 2018, emphasizing that neutral athletes cannot be portrayed as representing a specific country.

Russia later filed an appeal to the Court of Arbitration for Sport (CAS) against the WADA decision. The Court of Arbitration for Sport, on review of Russia's appeal of its case from WADA, ruled on 17 December 2020, to reduce the penalty that WADA had placed from four to two years. Instead of banning Russia from sporting events, the ruling allowed Russia to participate at the Olympics and other international events, but for a period of two years, the team cannot use the Russian name, flag, or anthem and must present themselves as "Neutral Athlete" or "Neutral Team". The ruling does allow for team uniforms to display "Russia" on the uniform as well as the use of the Russian flag colors within the uniform's design, although the name should be up to equal predominance as the "Neutral Athlete/Team" designation.

The IOC announced on 19 February 2021 that Russia would compete in both the 2020 Summer Olympics (which was postponed to 2021 due to the COVID-19 pandemic) and 2022 Winter Olympics under the acronym "ROC", after the name of the Russian Olympic Committee. The ROC team would be represented by the flag of the Russian Olympic Committee. On 22 April 2021, the IOC approved a fragment of Pyotr Tchaikovsky's Piano Concerto No. 1 to be used in place of the Russian national anthem.

=== Russian invasion of Ukraine ===
Russia was criticized for its troops build-up near the Ukrainian border. There were also calls to remove Russia from the Olympic sports committees. On 24 February 2022, 4 days after the Games finished, Russian President Vladimir Putin commenced a full-scale invasion of Ukraine, resulting in sporting sanctions against Russia. Many news outlets have alleged that China requested Russia not to conduct the latter's invasion of Ukraine before the conclusion of the Beijing Olympics.

== Environmental and health issues ==
=== Effects of the COVID-19 pandemic ===
There were mixed reactions towards the measures being used to contain the COVID-19 virus at the games. The Times reported that many athletes had welcomed the infection control protocols, including American freestyle skier Aaron Blunck and Britt Cox giving positive feedback, although some athletes have pushed back. Overall, the event had a 0.01% infection rate and was able to successfully keep Omicron variant at bay. Among athletes who tested positive, many were able to recover in the loop and compete, but a few were unable to compete.

The COVID-19 pandemic resulted in changes in qualifying for curling and women's ice hockey due to the cancellation of tournaments in 2020. The World Curling Federation proposed that qualification for curling be based on placement in the 2021 world championships and a dedicated qualification tournament to complete the field (in place of points earned across the 2020 and 2021 world championships). The IIHF based its qualification for the women's tournament upon existing IIHF World Rankings, without holding the 2020 Women's World Championship. The Asian Winter Games was also not held before this Olympics, potentially affecting the qualifications for some athletes.

On 23 December 2021, the National Hockey League (NHL) announced it will not be sending players to the Games, citing health and safety concerns, and a need to use the timeframe of the Olympics to make up the large number of games postponed since December 2021 due to Omicron variant.

=== Insufficient snowfall ===
During the bidding process, critics questioned the Beijing bid, citing that the proposed outdoor venue sites do not have reliable snowfall in winter for snow sports. Concerns have been raised that snow may need to be transported to the venues at great cost and with uncertain environmental consequences.

=== Energy crisis ===
The 2021 global energy crisis has intensified pressures on China ahead of the Winter Olympics. Al-Jazeera reported that "China's energy crisis is partially of its own making as President Xi Jinping tries to ensure blue skies at the Winter Olympics in Beijing next February and show the international community he's serious about de-carbonizing the economy."

=== Impact on Songshan National Nature Reserve ===
The environmental impact of hosting the Games near Beijing has been questioned. Some of the proposed venues will be adjacent to the Songshan National Nature Reserve and part of the same mountain system, and the environmental impact on the nature reserve of construction, and artificially covering parts of the mountain with snow, is uncertain. The Government of China has responded to these concerns by expanding the nature reserve by 31% of its original size.

== Human rights issues ==
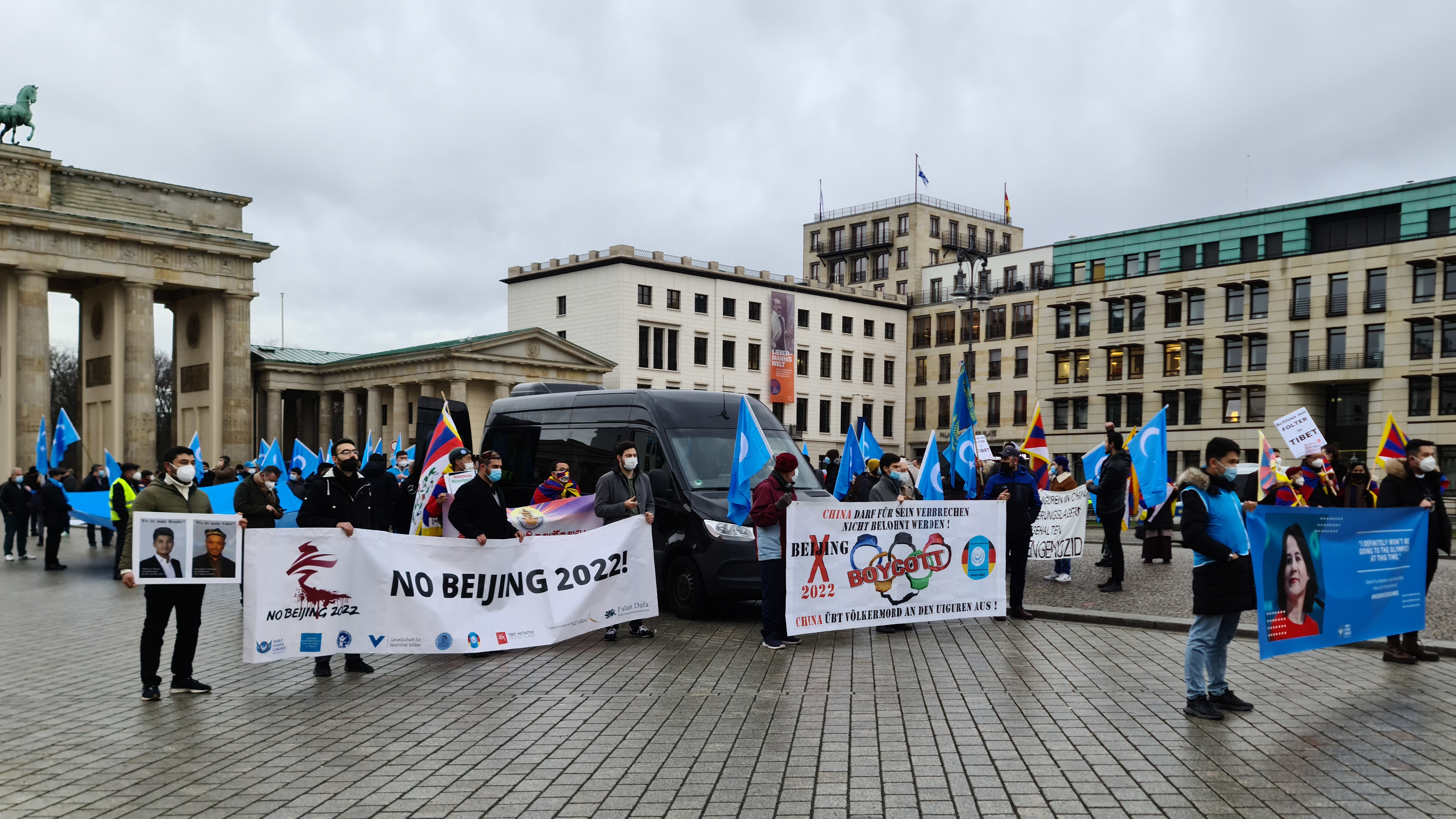
Demonstration of Uyghurs and Tibetans in front of the Brandenburg Gate in Berlin, 2 February 2022

Concerns over China's human rights record have cast a shadow over Beijing's Olympic Games, including a diplomatic boycott over serious human rights abuses against Uyghurs and other Muslim minorities in the country. Rights experts stated that crackdowns on human rights defenders, which can range from closing social media accounts to enforced disappearances, were typical in the lead up to sensitive events in China, where the Chinese Communist Party kept a tight lid on dissent.

=== Sportswashing ===
Critics say that the 2022 Winter Olympics is being used by the Chinese government for the purpose of sportswashing, a practice by which a country uses sporting events to distract from human rights abuses or other issues.

In January 2022 Amnesty International warned the international community against participating in China's sportswashing efforts. According to Amnesty "China is hoping for sportswashing gold and it's vital that every effort is made to counteract that." Amnesty also criticized the IOC directly.

=== Athlete safety ===
Members of the American congress from both major parties have expressed concerns about athlete safety. Retired Olympic cross-country skier Noah Hoffman has also expressed concerns about athlete safety citing China's human rights record and a lack of concern shown by the IOC.

=== Athletes' freedom of speech ===
In January 2022 the Beijing Organizing Committee warned that "Any behavior or speech that is against the Olympic spirit, especially against Chinese laws and regulations, are also subject to certain punishment."

A Human Rights Watch seminar warned athletes about speaking about human rights issues while in China. For their protection, the American team has been shielded from questions related to human rights.

Activists representing Chinese dissidents and the minority Uyghur and Tibetan populations encouraged athletes, sponsors, and other international participants in the games to use the platform to speak out on human rights.

=== Protests ===
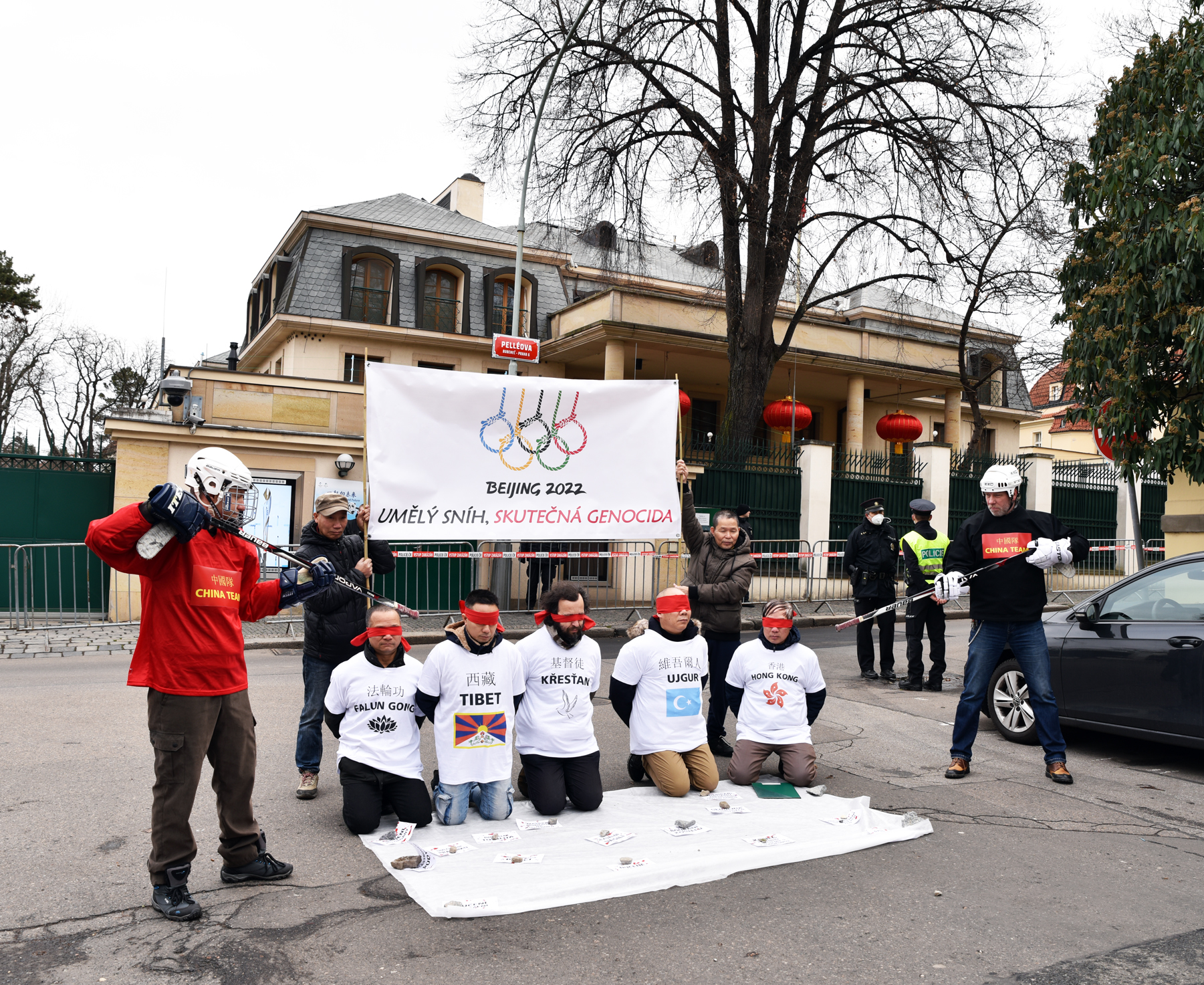
Demonstration in front of the Chinese embassy, Prague (4.2.2022). The banner reads, "Artificial snow, real genocide"

On 17 October 2021, Hong Kong American human rights activist Joey Siu, Tibetan-American student Tsela Zoksang and a Vietnamese-American activist protested against the hosting of the 2022 Winter Olympics by unfurling the Tibetan flag and a banner with the 2019–2020 Hong Kong protests' slogan 'Liberate Hong Kong, revolution of our times' at the Acropolis during the Olympic Flame ceremony. They were detained by the Greek Police. Siu was released after being detained for 26 hours while the others were released after 48 hours. Accused of "attempting to pollute, damage, and distort a historical monument", a Greek court acquitted them of all charges on 17 November 2022.

On 18 October 2021 activists from Free Tibet and Students for a Free Tibet disrupted the Olympic flame lighting ceremony again at Olympia in Greece. Three people, Chemi Lhamo, Fern MacDougal and Jason Leith, were arrested and detained for several days. They were charged and their trial was set to occur immediately before the games opened but it was immediately adjourned and a new date set for 1 December 2022.

In November 2021 activists held a 57-hour vigil outside the White House in Washington D.C.

In January 2022 a protest against China's hosting of the games was held in Washington, D.C. outside the Chinese embassy. Attendees included civil rights activist Chen Guangcheng and New Jersey politician Chris Smith. Smith described the 2022 Olympics as the "Genocide Games."

To protest the games and China's human rights record the artist Badiucao created an NFT collection entitled "Beijing 2022 Olympic" which featured works mixing Olympic imagery with human rights messaging.

A number of athletes have stated that they would boycott the Olympics opening ceremony.

On 4 February, a large protest against the games was held in Istanbul. Protesters included members of Turkey's Uyghur diaspora community. Hundreds of people in several countries protested against China's repression of its Uyghur minority and Tibetans.

After the games, Swedish Olympic champion Nils van der Poel gave his Beijing 2022 gold medal to the daughter of a Hong Kong dissident "to protest the Chinese Government's devastating human rights record".

== Propaganda and information operations issues ==
=== Propaganda and information operations ===
The Chinese government's internet troll networks were mobilized before the Games to support government messaging. This has included campaigns of intimidation against human rights activists abroad. The Ministry of Public Security's Spamouflage disinformation network transitioned to primarily push Olympic messaging in December 2021.

In the run up to the Olympics, the Chinese government deployed dozens of fake Twitter accounts to push the Government's position in the Peng Shuai scandal and the IOC's involvement. The New York Times and ProPublica identified a network of more than 3,000 inauthentic-looking Twitter accounts that appeared to be coordinating. Such accounts appeared to operate solely to amplify state media, as most of these accounts were recently created with very few followers, and their activity consisted solely of reposting China comments including from one account called "Spicy Panda" whose cartoons and videos rallied against the Olympic boycott. A Twitter spokesperson said that hundreds of accounts included in the investigation's findings have since been suspended for violating the "platform manipulation and spam policy," which prohibits "coordinated activity that attempts to artificially influence conversations through the use of multiple accounts, fake accounts and automation."

=== Censorship ===
Domestic Chinese criticism and debate on the potential environmental impacts caused by the Games are censored by the Chinese government on the press and internet. In recent years, censorship has been significantly stepped up. The government has banned, for example, Facebook, Twitter, Instagram, and, since 2019, Wikipedia.

The Citizen Lab report on the My2022 app (see below) discovered a "censorship keywords" list built into the app, and a feature that allows people to flag other "politically sensitive" expressions. The list of words included the names of Chinese leaders and government agencies, as well as references to the 1989 killing of pro-democracy protesters in Tiananmen Square, and the religious group Falun Gong.

==== Negative news censored during the games ====
On 28 January 2022, a few days before the opening ceremony, the Xuzhou chained woman incident was exposed on Chinese social media. Several media figures, including Han Song from the state-controlled Xinhua News Agency argued that people should be more concerned about the incident than the Winter Olympics. However, to avoid any negative news that could divert the public's attention from the Olympics, Chinese news media outlets were ordered by authorities to avoid reporting such cases, with many social media posts related to the incident censored. Some people who tried to dig into the story by investigating the case in Feng County were even detained by the police.

==== Alleged suspension of US athlete's Twitter account ====
US athlete Aaron Blunck alleged that he was suspended by Twitter after he praised the 2022 Beijing Olympics. He reposted a fan's comment that read: "Aaron Blunck [is] out here telling the truth and getting punished by his own government." He later also shared a commentator's tweet accusing the US government of causing his account to be shut down: "Twitter has executed the order of the Western ruling cabals... Punishment comes pretty fast." In his Instagram post, he tagged Twitter and asked: "What'd I do?"

However, it was revealed that the account had been suspended in September the previous year, over five months prior to the games. Twitter responded to the allegations saying that the account had been suspended in error and had since been recovered.

=== Espionage directed at athletes ===
China's espionage of athletes serves its political interests as well as addresses safety and COVID concerns. The smartphone app associated with the games, My2022, has been a particular subject of espionage concern.

All attendees to the Games, including athletes, audience members, and media, are required to use the My2022 app purportedly for daily Covid monitoring. The cybersecurity group Citizen Lab, a research institute at the University of Toronto's Munk School of Global Affairs and Public Policy, warned that the My2022 app fails to provide encryption on many of its files, and has security weaknesses that leave users exposed to data breaches. The Citizen Lab disclosed the concerns about the app on 3 December 2021, giving the organizing 15 days to respond and 45 days to fix the issues. A new iOS version of MY2022 was released on 6 January 2022, which failed to fix these problems, while adding a new "Green Health Code", feature that collects more medical data and also lacks SSL certificate validation making it vulnerable to attacks.

Numerous Olympic committees, including the British Olympic Association, the Australian Olympic Committee, Canadian Olympic Committee, NOC*NSF, and United States Olympic & Paralympic Committee, have recommended that attendees use burner phones, virtual private networks (VPNs), and create email accounts for their time in China, while leaving personal smartphones and laptops at home.

Cyber security firm Internet 2.0 has also warned of potential security risks during the Olympics, when it examined the technology sponsors of the Games and their products that show "the sophisticated and broad surveillance culture that exists in China". Internet 2.0 noted that "China's national data security laws are not designed with the Western values of privacy and liberty and do not offer the same level of protection" as the laws allow the government to request access to the user data captured by these products.

=== Sjoerd den Daas incident ===
During the Games, China enforced strict COVID-19 measures, requiring all participants including athletes, officials, and media to remain within a "closed loop" system that included competition venues, the media center, and designated accommodations to limit virus transmission.

On February 4, 2022, a Dutch journalist, Sjoerd den Daas was dragged away by a Chinese security guard while reporting live on the Beijing Olympic opening ceremony, stating "We have just been expelled from another area, so I'm afraid we'll have to come back to you later". His employer, the Dutch broadcaster NOS later addressed the incident on Twitter, stating: "Our correspondent [den Daas] was pulled away from the camera by security guards at 12:00 p.m. [6:00 a.m. ET] live in the NOS Journaal. Unfortunately, this is increasingly becoming a daily reality for journalists in China. He is fine and was able to finish his story a few minutes later".

IOC spokesman Mark Adams said that he thinks the security guard may have been "overzealous" and that the incident is a one-off and reassured that journalists could continue their work freely as long as they remained within the closed loop. Yan Jiarong, spokeswoman for the Beijing Olympics, said "we welcome all the international media to cover the Beijing 2022 Games and we will also protect the legal rights of the international journalists".

Den Daas pushed back against the IOC's characterization of the incident as an "isolated" case, asserting that he and other journalists had been “hindered or stopped multiple times” by police while covering topics related to the Games.

== Olympic torch relay ==
The choice of Qi Fabao, a People's Liberation Army commander who had been seriously injured after participating in the 2020–2021 China–India skirmishes, as one of the torchbearers has been controversial in India. As a result, India joined the diplomatic boycott of the games.

Amid human rights scrutiny, China chose a Uyghur athlete to help deliver the Olympic flame. For the final torch lighting, the Olympic flame was placed inside a giant snowflake in the "Bird's Nest" National Stadium by two athletes, Uyghur cross-country skier Dinigeer Yilamujiang from Xinjiang and Nordic combined competitor Zhao Jiawen.

Kamaltürk Yalqun, a torchbearer in the 2008 Olympics of Uyghur descent, supported a full boycott of the 2022 games and heavily criticized the Chinese government's treatment of his people.

== Hanbok row ==
During the opening ceremony and the parade representing the 56 ethnic groups of China, one of the performers, reportedly representing Korean Chinese, wore a hanbok. The display of the hanbok has drawn criticism and anger among some South Koreans and their politicians, who accused China of misappropriating the country's traditional clothing. Lee So-young, MP of the ruling Democratic Party of Korea, said he regretted seeing the use of a hanbok during the ceremony. Presidential candidate Lee Jae-myung referred to it as cultural appropriation. The opposition People Power Party also called the move a "rude act" and urged the Moon Jae-in government to act tough on China. Hwang Hee, the South Korean Minister of Culture, Sports and Tourism, attended the ceremony while dressed in a hanbok himself.

However, some South Koreans saw the hanbok-wearing woman as a representation of the estimated 2 million ethnic Koreans living in China and felt that the reactions were unnecessary. The Chinese Embassy in South Korea later responded that China respected the historical and cultural traditions of South Korea and that the hanbok belongs to ethnic Koreans everywhere, including those in China.

== Accidents ==
During training at the Yanqing National Sliding Centre in November 2021, Polish luger Mateusz Sochowicz encountered a closed gate despite being given a green light. He suffered a fractured knee cap and a cut to the leg bone. The track team "didn't know what to do", and Sochowicz spent half an hour on the ice before being transported to surgery. Had he not taken evasive action during the run, the incident could have ended in "tragedy". At the 2010 Vancouver Winter Games, Georgian luger Nodar Kumaritashvili was killed during training after he lost control and was thrown into a support pole. Following Sochowicz's injury, the International Luge Federation announced additional safety measures such as setting up "blockades at a start height" and installing a screen where lanes merge "to identify the exact position of the switch/barrier".

== Taiwan athlete outfit row ==
In early 2022, Huang Yu-Ting garnered much controversy after a video that she posted on 23 January, went viral of her wearing an outfit labeled "China" during practice, and she was later criticised heavily by Taiwanese netizens, especially those with pan-green political views, who had flooded her Facebook and Instagram account with hate comments. In response, Huang claimed on Instagram that the outfit was a gift from an athlete who was on the Chinese team, whom she befriended in Germany. She also posted a Taylor Swift music video, "Shake It Off," which is famed for its lyrics, "Haters gonna hate, hate, hate, hate," and she wrote alongside the video, "My dear haters, this song is for you."

Huang later removed the video post of her wearing the outfit, due to the social media backlash that came afterwards. According to a translation by the South China Morning Post, Huang separately made a post on Facebook where she wrote, "Thank you to everyone who cheered me up...I have removed the video due to too many unnecessary private messages!..."Sport is sport and in the world of sports, we do not differentiate between nationalities. After the Games, we all are good friends."

Ho Chih-wei, a Legislative Yuan member of the ruling Democratic Progressive Party (DPP) criticised Huang Yu-Ting, calling her "brainless" and demanding that she "shut up", as well as supporting a law that would punish athletes such as Huang with bans from sport events. Taiwan Premier Su Tseng-chang from the ruling DPP called for an investigation and punishment for Huang.

National identity is a highly sensitive issue in Taiwan. After the communist forces won the Chinese Civil War, the mainland was not represented at the Olympics, and the only Chinese team competing came from Taiwan. After most nations and the UN switched their recognition to Beijing, however, Taiwan has been competing as Chinese Taipei.

== Participation of women ==
Nordic combined remained the only Winter discipline that women could not compete in, with World Cup champion Tara Geraghty-Moats quoted as saying, "The IOC (International Olympic Committee) lets transgendered people into the Olympics in all sports, but not women into all sports." The International Ski Federation has said that it has been developing women's Nordic combined and intends for it to be added to the Olympic programme in the future. A previous request was rejected in 2018. According to the IOC, female quota positions for the 2022 Winter Games increased from 41 per cent to 45.44 per cent.

== Sporting controversies ==
By the end of the Beijing Olympics, a total five athletes were reported for doping violations.

=== Mixed team ski jumping normal hill event ===
During the mixed team normal hill event of ski jumping, the previous Olympic medalists, Daniela Iraschko-Stolz of Austria, Katharina Althaus of Germany, and Sara Takanashi of Japan, as well as the former world championship medalists Anna Odine Stroem and Silje Opseth of Norway were all disqualified prior to the start due to the concern that their jumpsuits were not tight enough. According to the officials at the event, jumpsuits had to fit tight enough to not yield the advantage over air, which was part of the newly updated International Ski Federation (FIS) regulations. The Japanese, Austrian, Norwegian, and German teams all suffered the heavy impact as their disqualified athletes automatically received 0 point for failing to make an attempt, which placed the four teams in fourth, fifth, eight, and ninth place respectively, while the Russian and Canadian teams capitalized on that and won silver and bronze medals respectively.

After the game, Althaus expressed her dissatisfaction with the disqualification, emphasizing that she wore the same jumpsuit which was approved for the individual normal hill event that took place two days before. Clas Brede Bråthen, the former ski jumper and manager of the Norwegian team who had the two team members disqualified, also raised the complaint, claiming the event as one of the sport's darker days. Bråthen added that "this is something we should have cleaned up in before the Olympics". After her disqualification, Opseth also said "I am just shocked. I do not understand anything about what happened today". Takanashi deeply apologized for her suit violation as the Japanese team could have been in the medal zone if it was not for her disqualification. After the controversy, Aga Baczkowska from FIS told the Norway's media NRK that the inspections at the event followed the new regulation. Baczkowska stated that it was the responsibility of the participating athletes to ensure that their jumpsuits were in compliance.

=== Mixed team 2000 metre short-track speed-skating event ===
In the semi-final heat of the 2000 metre mixed team relay in short-track speed-skating, the United States was disqualified after narrowly finishing in the second place behind Hungary. This allowed the Chinese team, who came in third, to claim the second place and advance to the finals to eventually win the gold medal. According to the officials at the event, the team was disqualified for causing the "interference inside the track with skaters coming in to take an exchange" upon the replay review. Ryan Pivirotto, the skater who was identified as the cause of the penalty, stated "The call came to me, on what I did. I don't even know really what I did, because there was no contact". Maame Biney, who was representing the United States in the Olympics but did not participate in the relay, found the decision to be an "interesting call". Andrew Heo, another member of the relay team, said "Obviously things didn't work out, but I think we believe that we belonged there. And I think we could've done really well in the final".

=== Men's 1000 metre short-track speedskating event ===
During the Heat 1 of the semi-finals in the men's 1000 metres short track speedskating event, Hwang Dae-heon of South Korea was disqualified after finishing first, which was followed in the Heat 2 by his countryman Lee June-seo being disqualified for a lane change that caused contact. As a result of their disqualifications, Li Wenlong and Wu Dajing of China advanced to the Final A race. In the Final A race, Shaolin Sándor Liu from Hungary was disqualified after crossing the finish line first, ultimately resulting in Ren Ziwei and Li Wenlong of China who finished after Liu to be awarded with the gold and silver medal, respectively. After the event, both the South Korean and the Hungarian team filed protests to the International Skating Union.

The International Skating Union (ISU) received and rejected the two protests from Hungary and South Korea on February 7, 2022. The ISU stated that the decisions in regards to any disqualification for rule violations cannot be challenged, adding that their Chief Referee had reviewed the incident with the Video Referee and stood by the final decisions. According to the ISU, Hwang Dae-heon was disqualified for the "illegal late pass causing contact" while the disqualification of Shaolin Sándor Liu was due to a "straight lane change from inside to out causing contact" and an "arm block at the finish". The Korean Sport & Olympic Committee later filed an official appeal to the Court of Arbitration for Sport.

=== Women's 500 metre short-track speed-skating event ===
After the close-up video of the incident surfaced on Reddit, some viewers of the quarter-finals in the women's 500 metres short track speedskating event noticed and accused the Chinese skater Fan Kexin of reaching over the leg of another competitor to flick a track marker at the Canadian skater Alyson Charles, which seemingly caused Charles to trip and crash along with Fan during the race. While no call was made on the incident, Charles was advanced to the semi-finals after it was assessed that she was impeded by another Canadian skater Florence Brunelle who got disqualified. Fan, who came in third after the crash, failed to advance.

=== Men's 5000 metres relay short-track speed skating event ===
During the 5000 metres relay event, also in short track speed skating, in the semifinals of the event, the Chinese team fell with 10 laps to go. This happened at a point in the race where Pascal Dion (from Canada) and a Chinese skater had their skates come into contact. The team was advanced to the A final, with no team disqualified during the race. The Chinese team were advanced, even though they finished last in the race and there was no impeding action on the team.

=== Men's snowboard slopestyle ===
In the men's snowboard slopestyle, Canada's Max Parrot had won the gold medal and China's Su Yiming won the silver. However the medal results stirred controversy on social media when BBC commentator Ed Leigh believed the gold medal should have been awarded to Su, and pointed out that Parrot, during his frontside 1440 in his second run, had actually committed a 'cardinal sin' by grabbing his knee instead of the board, and should have been deducted for it, but the judges had apparently failed to spot it. Replays showed him "failing to grab his board and instead clutching around his lower leg, meaning that the maneuver was incomplete and should have been marked down. Leigh wrote in the BBC, "The judges have put execution at such a premium that something like that should have cost him two or three points. So the gold has gone wrong there. ... I think Su Yiming actually took the gold there. This is a mistake on the judges' part."

Moreover, bronze medalist Mark McMorris felt he had the best run of the day, and should have been the gold medalist, "but knowing that I kind of had the run of the day and one of the best rounds of my life and the whole industry knows what happened". Parrot, acknowledged the error and still felt like he deserved the gold medal, "But in the end, it's a judged sport and the fact is I had the most technical run of the day on pretty much every feature". Lead judge for the event, Iztok Sumatic said, "there are so many factors. All I can say, in Max's defence, regarding this specific run, is that it was still an insane run. He killed it, especially on the rails." Ultimately the blame lay with the organizers, who failed to provide multiple angles of the event. Parrot reviewed the runs by the three medalists and, "he spotted three "little mistakes" during McMorris' turn, and also noted a few errors by Su", while Parrot, "didn't have any mistakes on five of the six features, and on the one jump, I had a bigger mistake".

=== Men's snowboard halfpipe ===
Public outrage was sparked by the controversially low judgment of Japanese snowboarder Ayumu Hirano's second run scoring which had made commentators and fans cry "foul" on the judges. Hirano then had to repeat the exceptional performance in his third run, and successfully landing the very "dangerous" triple cork again, this time under greater public scrutiny of the judges, and moving from second place to winning the gold medal.

=== Men's speed skating 500 metres ===
In the men's 500 metres speed skating event, a false start was called in the last two heats, one of which included current World Cup champion Laurent Dubreuil. This was questioned by 1992 Winter Olympics Champion Bart Veldkamp, who called it "very suspicious". According to Yetta Claytone of the Taylor Daily Press, due to the false start, Dubreuil had to be more cautious on his start, and his reaction time was slower than the initial start. According to Sportnieuws.nl, a false start would have disrupted the athletes' concentration, and also used up energy. However, Dubreuil believed the false start shouldn't be used as an excuse as it was, "something that's totally possible to overcome and that it shouldn't make a difference".

=== Figure skating ===
The medal ceremony for the figure skating team event, originally scheduled for Tuesday, 8 February, was delayed over what International Olympic Committee (IOC) spokesperson Mark Adams described as a situation that required "legal consultation" with the International Skating Union. Several media outlets reported on Wednesday that the issue was over a positive test, held in December 2021, for trimetazidine by the ROC's Kamila Valieva, which was officially confirmed on February 11. The results are pending investigation. The Russian Anti-Doping Agency (RUSADA), previously under suspension from the World Anti-Doping Agency (WADA) since 2015 for its years of serving solely to hide the positive doping results of Russian athletes (re-instated in September 2018), cleared Valieva on February 9, a day after the December test results were released, two months after the test. The IOC, WADA, and International Skating Union (ISU) are appealing RUSADA's decision.

On February 14, the Court of Arbitration for Sport (CAS) ruled that Valieva should be allowed to compete in the women's single event, deciding that preventing her from competing "would cause her irreparable harm in the circumstances", though her gold medal in the team event was still under consideration. The favorable decision from the court was made in part due to her age, as minor athletes are subject to different rules than adult athletes. The IOC announced that the medal ceremony would not take place until the investigation is over and there is a concrete decision whether to strip Russia of their medals.

By 9 March 2022, Travis Tygart of the USADA reported that Valieva had not requested that her "B" sample be tested, apparently accepting the results of initial testing and relying on her explanation that the banned substance TMZ belonged to her grandfather and only accidentally contaminated or became mixed into her own use of allowed nutrients and supplements. Tygart further stated that as a minor Valieva could still be either fully exculpated or given a warning concerning her testing positive depending on the extent of findings in the on-going RUSADA investigation of doping. According to Tygart, an adverse finding against her as a first offense could still be assessed as a two-year suspension, which is half of the suspension time which could be assessed for adults.

On 29 January 2024, the CAS disqualified Valieva for four years retroactive to 25 December 2021 for an anti-doping rule violation. On 30 January 2024, the ISU reallocated medals, upgrading the United States to gold and Japan to silver while downgrading ROC to bronze, but this decision has not yet been ratified by the IOC. Valieva would be made eligible for participation in the 2026 Winter Olympics following her four-year suspension. However, the previous full-scale invasion of Ukraine by Russia in 2022 resulted in further sporting sanctions against Russia which remain in effect as of February 2024. Russian athletes are currently allowed to compete at the Olympics as neutrals, with the Russian delegation called Individual Neutral Athletes at the 2024 Summer Olympics.

=== Men's mass start ===
The U.S. speedskater Joey Mantia alleged that the South Korean speedskater Lee Seung-hoon made contact by pulling his arm back, costing him the bronze medal during the mass start final. Mantia lost by a 0.002-second margin. According to Mantia, he felt contact and told his coach "He got me" after the race. Mantia recalled "Coming up on him, I thought my blade was in front of his, and then he put his back in front of mine. I don't know if there was contact ... it felt like maybe a little bit, maybe not on purpose, but it happens." When asked if he made the contact with Mantia, Lee said he could not remember since he was flustered during the final moment at the finish line. Mantia and his coaches watched the replay several times, and protested that he had been pulled back at the finish line. However, the team did not expect any changes to the result because the Mass Final is a new event with minimal precedent for rules. The United States team lodged a challenge, but Lee was awarded with the bronze medal.
