= Short-track speed skating at the 2022 Winter Olympics – Men's 1500 metres =

Men's 1500 metres at the XXIV Olympic Winter Games
- Short track speed skating
- Venue: Capital Indoor Stadium, Beijing
- Date: 9 February 2022
- Competitors: 36 from 16 nations
- Winning time: 2:09.219

Medalists
1st place, gold medalist(s)		Hwang Dae-heon	South Korea
2nd place, silver medalist(s)		Steven Dubois	Canada
3rd place, bronze medalist(s)		Semion Elistratov	ROC

The men's 1500 metres competition in short track speed skating at the 2022 Winter Olympics was held on 9 February, at the Capital Indoor Stadium in Beijing. Hwang Dae-heon of South Korea became the Olympic champion, this was his first Olympic gold. Steven Dubois of Canada won silver, his first Olympic medal, and Semion Elistratov, representing the Russian Olympic Committee, bronze. Due to unusually high number of penalties and advancements in semi-finals, 10 athletes were competing in Final A.

The defending champion and the Olympic record holder Lim Hyo-jun, who now represents China after playing as a South Korean athlete at the 2018 Winter Olympics, did not enter the event. The silver medalist and world record holder, Sjinkie Knegt, and the bronze medalist, Semion Elistratov, qualified as well. Charles Hamelin was the 2021 World Short Track Speed Skating champion at the 1500 m distance. Itzhak de Laat and Elistratov were the silver and bronze medalists, respectively. Many top athletes did not participate in the championship, however. Ren Ziwei was leading the 2021–22 ISU Short Track Speed Skating World Cup at the 1500 m distance with four races completed before the Olympics, followed by Elistratov and Park Jang-hyuk.

== Qualification ==
Countries were assigned quotas based on their performance during the 2021–22 ISU Short Track Speed Skating World Cup, with the top 36 athletes (maximum of three per country qualifying quotas. If a NOC declined a quota spot, it was distributed to the next available athlete, only if the maximum quota of 56 athletes per gender was not surpassed.

== Records ==
Prior to this competition, the existing world and Olympic records were as follows.

World record	Sjinkie Knegt (NED)	2:07.943	Salt Lake City, United States	13 November 2016
Olympic record	Lim Hyo-jun (KOR)	2:10.485	Gangneung, South Korea	10 February 2018

The following records were set during the competition.

Date	Round	Athlete	Country	Time	Record	Ref
9 February	Quarterfinal 1	Shaolin Sándor Liu	Hungary	2:09.213	OR	

== Results ==
=== Quarterfinals ===
Q – qualified for the semifinals
ADV – advanced
PEN – penalty
OR - olympic record

Rank	Heat	Name	Country	Time	Notes
1	1	Shaolin Sándor Liu	Hungary	2:09.213	Q, OR
2	1	Pascal Dion	Canada	2:09.723	Q
3	1	Denis Ayrapetyan	ROC	2:09.776	Q
4	1	Vladislav Bykanov	Israel	2:09.932	q
5	1	Roberts Krūzbergs	Latvia	2:10.999	
6	1	Michał Niewiński	Poland	2:12.852	
1	2	Lee June-seo	South Korea	2:18.630	Q
2	2	Sven Roes	Netherlands	2:18.687	Q
3	2	Stijn Desmet	Belgium	2:19.112	Q
4	2	Sun Long	China	2:19.244	
5	2	Andrew Heo	United States	2:19.482	
	2	Pietro Sighel	Italy		PEN
1	3	Hwang Dae-heon	South Korea	2:14.910	Q
2	3	Semion Elistratov	ROC	2:15.094	Q
3	3	Steven Dubois	Canada	2:15.123	Q
4	3	Kota Kikuchi	Japan	2:15.243	
5	3	Reinis Bērziņš	Latvia	2:15.371	ADV
	3	Ryan Pivirotto	United States		PEN
1	4	Charles Hamelin	Canada	2:11.239	Q
2	4	Adil Galiakhmetov	Kazakhstan	2:11.823	Q
3	4	Park Jang-hyuk	South Korea	2:12.116	Q
4	4	Quentin Fercoq	France	2:15.347	
5	4	Itzhak de Laat	Netherlands	3:08.907	
	4	Denis Nikisha	Kazakhstan		PEN
1	5	Sjinkie Knegt	Netherlands	2:12.208	Q
2	5	Kazuki Yoshinaga	Japan	2:12.450	Q
3	5	John-Henry Krueger	Hungary	2:12.525	Q
4	5	Yuri Confortola	Italy	2:12.853	q
5	5	Shogo Miyata	Japan	2:13.799	
6	5	Zhang Tianyi	China	No time	
1	6	Ren Ziwei	China	2:15.084	Q
2	6	Shaoang Liu	Hungary	2:15.376	Q
3	6	Farrell Treacy	Great Britain	2:16.880	Q
4	6	Daniil Eibog	ROC	2:16.975	
5	6	Sébastien Lepape	France	2:41.547	
6	6	Luca Spechenhauser	Italy	2:56.796	

=== Semifinals ===
QA – qualified for Final A
QB – qualified for Final B

Rank	Heat	Name	Country	Time	Notes
1	1	Lee June-seo	South Korea	2:10.586	QA
2	1	Shaolin Sándor Liu	Hungary	2:10.685	QA
3	1	Denis Ayrapetyan	ROC	2:10.773	QB
4	1	Sven Roes	Netherlands	2:10.841	QB
5	1	Stijn Desmet	Belgium	2:11.169	QB
6	1	Vladislav Bykanov	Israel	2:13.491	
7	1	Pascal Dion	Canada	2:15.271	
1	2	Hwang Dae-heon	South Korea	2:13.188	QA
2	2	Semion Elistratov	ROC	2:13.229	QA
3	2	Kazuki Yoshinaga	Japan	2:14.014	QB
4	2	Reinis Bērziņš	Latvia	2:14.714	QB
5	2	John-Henry Krueger	Hungary	2:18.671	ADVB
6	2	Steven Dubois	Canada	2:38.000	ADVA
	2	Sjinkie Knegt	Netherlands		PEN
1	3	Shaoang Liu	Hungary	2:12.519	QA
2	3	Park Jang-hyuk	South Korea	2:12.751	QA
3	3	Farrell Treacy	Great Britain	2:13.736	ADVA
4	3	Adil Galiakhmetov	Kazakhstan	2:18.291	ADVA
5	3	Yuri Confortola	Italy	No time	ADVA
	3	Ren Ziwei	China		PEN
	3	Charles Hamelin	Canada		PEN

=== Finals ===
==== Final B ====
Rank	Name	Country	Time	Notes
11	John-Henry Krueger	Hungary	2:18.059	
12	Denis Ayrapetyan	ROC	2:18.076	
13	Stijn Desmet	Belgium	2:18.278	
14	Sven Roes	Netherlands	2:18.299	
15	Reinis Bērziņš	Latvia	2:18.499	
16	Kazuki Yoshinaga	Japan	2:18.585	

==== Final A ====
Rank	Name	Country	Time	Notes
1st place, gold medalist(s)	Hwang Dae-heon	South Korea	2:09.219	
2nd place, silver medalist(s)	Steven Dubois	Canada	2:09.254	
3rd place, bronze medalist(s)	Semion Elistratov	ROC	2:09.267	
4	Shaoang Liu	Hungary	2:09.409	
5	Lee June-seo	South Korea	2:09.622	
6	Shaolin Sándor Liu	Hungary	2:09.953	
7	Park Jang-hyuk	South Korea	2:10.176	
8	Adil Galiakhmetov	Kazakhstan	2:11.584	
9	Farrell Treacy	Great Britain	2:11.988	
10	Yuri Confortola	Italy	2:12.384	
