= Short-track speed skating at the 2022 Winter Olympics – Men's 1000 metres =

Men's 1000 metres at the XXIV Olympic Winter Games
- Short track speed skating
- Venue: Capital Indoor Stadium, Beijing
- Date: 5 and 7 February 2022
- Competitors: 32 from 17 nations
- Winning time: 1:26.768

Medalists
1st place, gold medalist(s)		Ren Ziwei	China
2nd place, silver medalist(s)		Li Wenlong	China
3rd place, bronze medalist(s)		Shaoang Liu	Hungary

The men's 1000 metres competition in short track speed skating at the 2022 Winter Olympics was held on 5 February (heats) and 7 February (finals), at the Capital Indoor Stadium in Beijing. Ren Ziwei of China won the event, achieving his first individual Olympic gold medal. His teammate, Li Wenlong took the silver – his first Olympic medal, and Shaoang Liu of Hungary won the bronze.

The 2018 champion, Samuel Girard, retired from competitions. The 2018 silver medalist, John-Henry Krueger, qualified for the Olympics but was representing Hungary rather than the United States, which he represented in 2018. The bronze medalist, Seo Yi-ra, was not competing. Shaolin Sándor Liu was the 2021 World Short Track Speed Skating champion at the 1000 m distance. Shaoang Liu and Pietro Sighel were the silver and bronze medalists, respectively. Many top athletes did not participate in the championship, however. Pascal Dion was leading the 2021–22 ISU Short Track Speed Skating World Cup at the 1000 m distance with four races completed before the Olympics, followed by Hwang Dae-heon, the world record holder, and Itzhak de Laat.

== Qualification ==
Countries were assigned quotas based on their performance during the 2021–22 ISU Short Track Speed Skating World Cup, with the top 32 athletes (maximum of three per country qualifying quotas. If a NOC declined a quota spot, it was distributed to the next available athlete, only if the maximum quota of 56 athletes per gender was not surpassed.

== Records ==
Prior to this competition, the existing world and Olympic records were as follows.

World record	Hwang Dae-heon (KOR)	1:20.875	Salt Lake City, United States	12 November 2016
Olympic record	Charles Hamelin (CAN)	1:23.407	Gangneung, South Korea	13 February 2018

The following records were set during the competition.

Date	Round	Athlete	Country	Time	Record	Ref
5 February	Heat 5	Hwang Dae-heon	South Korea	1:23.042	OR	

== Results ==
=== Heats ===
Rank	Heat	Name	Country	Time	Notes
1	1	Park Jang-hyuk	South Korea	1:24.081	Q
2	1	Andrew Heo	United States	1:24.106	Q
3	1	Itzhak de Laat	Netherlands	1:24.332	ADV
4	1	Niall Treacy	Great Britain	1:32.243	
1	2	Ren Ziwei	China	1:23.772	Q
2	2	Quentin Fercoq	France	1:23.917	Q
3	2	Jens van 't Wout	Netherlands	1:23.946	
4	2	Farrell Treacy	Great Britain	1:24.935	
1	3	Wu Dajing	China	1:23.927	Q
2	3	Jordan Pierre-Gilles	Canada	1:24.067	Q
3	3	Semion Elistratov	ROC	1:24.077	
4	3	Shogo Miyata	Japan	1:24.367	
1	4	Lee June-seo	South Korea	1:24.698	Q
2	4	Pascal Dion	Canada	1:24.771	Q
3	4	Adil Galiakhmetov	Kazakhstan	1:24.855	
4	4	Vladislav Bykanov	Israel	1:24.875	
1	5	Hwang Dae-heon	South Korea	1:23.042	Q, OR
2	5	Sjinkie Knegt	Netherlands	1:23.097	Q
3	5	Li Wenlong	China	1:23.140	q
4	5	Sébastien Lepape	France	1:26.069	
1	6	John-Henry Krueger	Hungary	1:25.236	Q
2	6	Furkan Akar	Turkey	1:25.462	Q
3	6	Kazuki Yoshinaga	Japan	1:25.574	ADV
	6	Denis Ayrapetyan	ROC		PEN
1	7	Shaolin Sándor Liu	Hungary	1:25.262	Q
2	7	Ryan Pivirotto	United States	1:54.437	Q
3	7	Pietro Sighel	Italy	2:10.039	ADV
	7	Stijn Desmet	Belgium		PEN
1	8	Shaoang Liu	Hungary	1:23.796	Q
2	8	Brendan Corey	Australia	1:23.908	Q
3	8	Roberts Krūzbergs	Latvia	1:23.979	
	8	Luca Spechenhauser	Italy		PEN

=== Quarterfinals ===
Rank	Heat	Name	Country	Time	Notes
1	1	Andrew Heo	United States	1:24.603	Q
2	1	Wu Dajing	China	1:33.302	Q
3	1	Park Jang-hyuk	South Korea	No time	ADV
	1	Pietro Sighel	Italy		PEN
	1	Jordan Pierre-Gilles	Canada		PEN
1	2	Lee June-seo	South Korea	1:23.682	Q
2	2	Shaoang Liu	Hungary	1:23.940	Q
3	2	Quentin Fercoq	France	1:24.411	
4	2	Pascal Dion	Canada	No time	
	2	Kazuki Yoshinaga	Japan		PEN
1	3	Furkan Akar	Turkey	1:25.490	Q
2	3	Ren Ziwei	China	1:34.211	Q
3	3	Itzhak de Laat	Netherlands	1:42.490	ADV
	3	John-Henry Krueger	Hungary		PEN
	3	Brendan Corey	Australia		PEN
1	4	Hwang Dae-heon	South Korea	1:24.693	Q
2	4	Li Wenlong	China	1:30.550	Q
3	4	Shaolin Sándor Liu	Hungary	1:55.248	ADV
4	4	Ryan Pivirotto	United States	2:08.364	
	4	Sjinkie Knegt	Netherlands		YC

=== Semifinals ===
Rank	Heat	Name	Country	Time	Notes
1	1	Ren Ziwei	China	1:26.576	QA
2	1	Li Wenlong	China	1:26.722	QA
3	1	Furkan Akar	Turkey	1:27.102	QB
	1	Hwang Dae-heon	South Korea		PEN
	1	Park Jang-hyuk	South Korea	DNS	
1	2	Shaolin Sándor Liu	Hungary	1:23.567	QA
2	2	Wu Dajing	China	1:23.928	QA
3	2	Andrew Heo	United States	1:24.023	QB
4	2	Itzhak de Laat	Netherlands	1:24.229	QB
5	2	Shaoang Liu	Hungary	1:35.384	ADVA
	2	Lee June-seo	South Korea		PEN

=== Finals ===
==== Final B ====
Rank	Name	Country	Time	Notes
5	Itzhak de Laat	Netherlands	1:35.925	
6	Furkan Akar	Turkey	1:36.052	
7	Andrew Heo	United States	1:36.140	

==== Final A ====
Rank	Name	Country	Time	Notes
1st place, gold medalist(s)	Ren Ziwei	China	1:26.768	
2nd place, silver medalist(s)	Li Wenlong	China	1:29.917	
3rd place, bronze medalist(s)	Shaoang Liu	Hungary	1:35.693	
4	Wu Dajing	China	1:42.937	
	Shaolin Sándor Liu	Hungary		YC

== Concerns and controversies ==
Two Korean competitors were penalized during the semifinals and Shaolin Sándor Liu of Hungary at the conclusion of the A final. Two skaters from China advanced to the A final as a result of the penalties during the semifinals.

Both the Korean team and Hungarian teams filed a protest against the penalty and yellow card decisions and the ISU (International Skating Union) posted a statement regarding these protests. Based on the ISU General Regulations, Rule 123, paragraphs 4 and 5, the Referee confirmed that the protests are being rejected. More specifically,

- A protest from the Korean team inquiring for the reasons for the penalty during the 1000 m semi-final of HWANG Daeheon. As announced on the video screen in the arena, the Skater got a penalty for an “illegal late pass causing contact”.
- A protest from the Hungarian team against the yellow card for LIU Shaolin Sandor in the 1000 m Final A. As announced on the video screen in the arena, the Skater received a yellow card for two penalties in the same race. The first penalty: “in the straight lane change from inside to out causing contact” and the second penalty was for an “arm block at the finish”.

The Korean Sport & Olympic Committee did not accept this statement however and later filed an official appeal with the Court of Arbitration for Sport over the disqualification of two of the South Korean athletes from the event's semifinals.
