= Short-track speed skating at the 2022 Winter Olympics – Men's 5000 metre relay =

Men's 5000 metre relay at the XXIV Olympic Winter Games
- Short track speed skating
- Venue: Capital Indoor Stadium, Beijing
- Date: 11 and 16 February 2022
- Competitors: 34 from 8 nations
- Teams: 8
- Winning time: 6:41.257

Medalists
1st place, gold medalist(s)		Charles Hamelin; Steven Dubois; Pascal Dion; Jordan Pierre-Gilles; Maxime Laoun	Canada
2nd place, silver medalist(s)		Lee June-seo; Kim Dong-wook; Hwang Dae-heon; Kwak Yoon-gy; Park Jang-hyuk	South Korea
3rd place, bronze medalist(s)		Pietro Sighel; Yuri Confortola; Tommaso Dotti; Andrea Cassinelli	Italy

The men's 5000 metre relay competition in short track speed skating at the 2022 Winter Olympics was held on 11 February (semifinals) and 16 February (finals), at the Capital Indoor Stadium in Beijing. The Canadian team won gold, with South Korea winning silver and Italy the bronze.

The defending champion were Hungary, with China and Canada being second and third in 2018. The Netherlands were the 2021 World Short Track Speed Skating champion, Hungary and Italy were the silver and bronze medalists, respectively. Many top athletes did not participate in the championship, however. Canada were leading the 2021–22 ISU Short Track Speed Skating World Cup with four races completed before the Olympics, followed by South Korea and Hungary.

== Qualification ==
The top with the top 8 countries qualified a relay through the 2021–22 ISU Short Track Speed Skating World Cup, including host nation China.

== Records ==
Prior to this competition, the existing world and Olympic records were as follows.

World record	Hungary; Csaba Burján; Cole Krueger; Shaoang Liu; Shaolin Sándor Liu	6:28.625	Calgary, Canada	4 November 2018
Olympic record	Hungary; Shaoang Liu; Shaolin Sándor Liu; Viktor Knoch; Csaba Burján	6:31.971	Gangneung, South Korea	22 February 2018

== Results ==
=== Semifinals ===
Rank	Heat	Country	Athletes	Time	Notes
1	1	Canada	Charles Hamelin; Maxime Laoun; Steven Dubois; Pascal Dion	6:38.752	QA
2	1	Italy	Pietro Sighel; Yuri Confortola; Tommaso Dotti; Andrea Cassinelli	6:38.899	QA
3	1	Japan	Kazuki Yoshinaga; Shogo Miyata; Kota Kikuchi; Katsunori Koike	6:40.446	QB
4	1	China	Wu Dajing; Ren Ziwei; Sun Long; Li Wenlong	6:51.040	ADVA
1	2	South Korea	Lee June-seo; Kim Dong-wook; Hwang Dae-heon; Kwak Yoon-gy	6:37.879	QA
2	2	ROC	Semen Elistratov; Konstantin Ivliev; Pavel Sitnikov; Denis Ayrapetyan	6:37.925	QA
3	2	Netherlands	Itzhak de Laat; Sjinkie Knegt; Sven Roes; Jens van 't Wout	6:37.927	QB
4	2	Hungary	Shaoang Liu; Shaolin Sándor Liu; John-Henry Krueger; Bence Nógrádi	6:45.172	QB

=== Finals ===
==== Final B ====
Rank	Country	Athletes	Time	Notes
6	Hungary	Shaoang Liu; Shaolin Sándor Liu; John-Henry Krueger; Bence Nógrádi	6:39.713	
7	Netherlands	Itzhak de Laat; Sjinkie Knegt; Sven Roes; Jens van 't Wout	6:39.780	
8	Japan	Kazuki Yoshinaga; Shogo Miyata; Kota Kikuchi; Katsunori Koike	6:40.545	

==== Final A ====
Rank	Country	Athletes	Time	Notes
1st place, gold medalist(s)	Canada	Charles Hamelin; Steven Dubois; Jordan Pierre-Gilles; Pascal Dion	6:41.257	
2nd place, silver medalist(s)	South Korea	Lee June-seo; Hwang Dae-heon; Kwak Yoon-gy; Park Jang-hyuk	6:41.679	
3rd place, bronze medalist(s)	Italy	Pietro Sighel; Yuri Confortola; Tommaso Dotti; Andrea Cassinelli	6:43.431	
4	ROC	Semen Elistratov; Konstantin Ivliev; Pavel Sitnikov; Denis Ayrapetyan	6:43.440	
5	China	Wu Dajing; Ren Ziwei; Sun Long; Li Wenlong	6:51.654	

== Controversy ==
During the semifinals of the event, the Chinese team fell with 10 laps to go. There was no obvious obstruction on the Chinese skater, but they were advanced to the A final, with no team disqualified during the race. The Chinese team were advanced, even though they finished last in the race and there was no impeding action on the team.
