= Kim Dong-wook (disambiguation) =

Kim Dong-wook (born 1983) is a South Korean actor.

Kim Dong-wook may also refer to:

- JK Kim Dong-wook (born 1975), South Korean singer
- Kim Dong-wook (footballer) (born 1989), South Korean footballer
- Kim Dong-wook (speed skater) (born 1993), South Korean short track speed skater
