= Kim Dong-wook (speed skater) =

South Korean speed skater (born 1993)

Personal information
- Nationality: South Korean
- Born: 23 April 1993 (age 33) Yeosu-si, South Korea
- Height: 168 cm (5 ft 6 in)

Sport
- Country: South Korea
- Sport: Short track speed skating
Medal record
Men's short track speed skating
Representing South Korea
Olympic Games
Silver medal – second place	2022 Beijing	5000 m relay
World Cup
Silver medal – second place	2019–20 Final	5000 m relay
Silver medal – second place	2021–22 Final	5000 m relay
Bronze medal – third place	2019–20 Final	2000 m mixed relay

Kim Dong-wook (born 23 April 1993) is a South Korean short track speed skater.

He participated at the 2019–20 ISU Short Track Speed Skating World Cup, winning a medal.

== Filmography ==
=== Television show ===
Year	Title	Role	Notes	Ref.
2022	Radio Star	Guest	Episode 759, with Kwak Yoon-gy, Hwang Dae-heon, Park Jang-hyuk and Lee June-seo	
