= Xuzhou chained woman incident =

Human trafficking event in China

Douyin video screenshot, showing Feng County woman Yang was chained to the neck, locked in a shed.

The Xuzhou chained woman incident (Chinese: 徐州铁链女事件), also known as the Xuzhou eight-child mother incident (Chinese: 徐州八孩母亲事件), is a case of human trafficking, false imprisonment, sexual assault, severe mistreatment, and subsequent events that came to light in late January 2022 in Xuzhou's Feng County, Jiangsu, People's Republic of China. The video of a mentally disturbed and unlawfully imprisoned woman who was chained to a wall and who gave birth to eight children went viral on China's internet and sparked a huge public outcry.

Due to strict political control and censorship of media in China, many of the country's top investigative journalists left the profession in the 2010s. As a result, Chinese internet users who demanded answers had to dig into the story themselves. Some netizens were arrested while investigating the case, as the incident unfolded during the politically sensitive period of the 2022 Winter Olympics.

Local officials first dismissed the human trafficking claims on 28 January, by saying the woman had been legitimately married to a local man and was mentally ill. However, facing continuous public pressure, Chinese authorities later conducted two higher-level investigations that led to the arrests of two people suspected of human trafficking, as well as the woman's husband for "illegal detention". Authorities have also punished 17 officials in the county for "dereliction of duty" in the handling of the case. Public opinion used this incident to call on the Chinese government to protect rural women and individuals with mental illnesses, and to combat the issues of trafficking women and children as well as sexual assault in rural areas of China. There are also voices of skepticism questioning the actions of local government and official media in handling this event.

== Background ==
In the 1980s, as the relaxation of the dual urban-rural household registration system after the Opening Up and Reform Policies loosened restrictions on population movement and rural residents gained access to tradable currency in the shift towards a market economy, human trafficking gradually proliferated across mainland China. Despite Strike Hard Against Crime Campaign in 1983 that led to a temporary decline in such criminal activities, human trafficking began to resurge in the latter half of 1985. Northern districts of Jiangsu Province was an underdeveloped region where many impoverished men, seeking to continue their family lineage, took risky measures to purchase wives from even poorer regions such as Yunnan, Guizhou, and Sichuan. Located at the intersection of Jiangsu, Shandong, Henan, and Anhui provinces, Northern districts of Jiangsu Province, including Feng County, was a vital railway hub in mainland China, facilitating the influx of "bride imports". Consequently, since 1985, numerous women were abducted and trafficked into Northern Jiangsu, with a peak during the period from 1988 to 1990 when as many as 2,000 to 3,000 Yunnan women were abducted to the region in a single year. After 1993, a phenomenon known as "people bringing people" even emerged, where women who had been brought to Northern Jiangsu earlier started introducing women from their hometowns to the area. In 2000, the Chinese government launched a targeted crackdown on human trafficking, coupled with technological advancements and the integration of household registration information, resulting in a decline in nationwide human trafficking activities, including in Feng County.

== Incident ==
On January 28, 2022, a Douyin user published a video in which Dong Zhimin (Chinese: 董志民) dresses his children and eats in his room, while his wife, known as Yang, is chained by Dong to a wall in a dilapidated hut next to the family's large house in the middle of winter. Yang wears no shoes, has messy hair and muddy cheeks, and her food is seen scattered on the floor.

After the video went viral, the Feng County propaganda department issued a statement, saying that Yang is legally married to Dong, that there is no human trafficking involved, and that Yang was diagnosed with mental illness.

Two days later, local authorities issued another statement, saying that Yang was a beggar and was taken in by Dong's late father in 1998, though her identity was not verified when Dong registered for marriage, adding that Yang's condition has been worsening since 2021, hence the dog chain to "prevent her from hurting others".

== Investigations ==
On February 7, 2022, the Chinese Communist Party (CCP) committee of Xuzhou and its municipal government issued a statement, saying that Yang originally came from Fugong County, Yunnan, and got divorced in 1996. A woman surnamed Sang from the same village took Yang to Jiangsu for medical treatment. According to Sang, Yang wandered off when they got off the train, but she neither called the police nor informed Yang's family.

On February 10, 2022, the Xuzhou official investigation team gave another statement saying that the incident is indeed human trafficking. Dong, Sang, and her husband are the suspects of the case. The three people have since been arrested and detained.

The Xuzhou authorities' report, however, has not quelled the public's skepticism, including questions over the true identity of the woman in chains.

Due to strict political control and censorship of media in China, many of the country's top investigative journalists left the profession in the 2010s. As a result, Chinese internet users who demanded answers had to dig into the story themselves. Some visited Yang's home village and other places to conduct interviews. On February 11, two female volunteers were reportedly detained by the police in Feng County while investigating the case.

On February 17, 2022, the CCP committee of Jiangsu province was reported to have set up another investigation team to conduct a "full investigation into the incident of the chained woman in Feng County". The investigation found the true identity of the woman as Xiao Huamei from Yagu Village (亚谷村), Zilijia Township, Fugong County, Nujiang Lisu Autonomous Prefecture, western Yunnan Province, southwest China (bordering Myanmar's Kachin State to the west), and confirmed that she was a victim of multiple human trafficking crimes and released a detailed timeline. The police have detained six people and fired eight lower-level Communist Party officials during the investigation, for various reasons including failing to protect the public's interest and publishing false information.

On April 7, 2023, six people, including Dong, were sentenced to prison terms ranging from 8 to 13 years for abduction, with Dong receiving a 9-year sentence.

== Reactions ==
The incident has been reported by a number of media outlets outside of China, including The New York Times, The Wall Street Journal, BBC News, and Deutsche Welle. Commentators expressed concern over Chinese women's wellbeing. Radio Free Asia commented that the incident reflects the lack of protection of women's rights in China, adding that almost no official media in China investigated or reported on the incident.

The event is particular in that it unfolded during the already controversial 2022 Winter Olympics in Beijing, with people demanding answers despite the increasingly censored and politically sensitive space of Chinese internet. Even through early 2023 journalists were still not allowed to independently investigate the incident.

Geling Yan, a renowned Chinese-American author and screenwriter, was censored on China's internet after commenting on the incident.

Mo Shaoping, a Chinese lawyer who previously represented Liu Xiaobo, said that if Yang was mentally ill, a rape investigation against Dong should also be conducted.

Some commentators questioned whether there was female infanticide involved in the case, since seven of the eight children by Yang and Dong are boys, a highly unlikely event. (Note: Binomial(7; 8, 0.5) = 3.125%.)

== See also ==
- Blind Mountain
