= Zhang Jing (speed skater) =

Chinese short-track speed skater and coach

Zhang Jing (simplified Chinese: 张晶; traditional Chinese: 張晶; pinyin: Zhāng Jīng; born 18 October 1973), also known as Lina Zhang, is a Chinese short-track speed skating coach and former skater. Since 2012 she has been the head coach of the Hungarian speed skating team, which won a gold medal in Men's 5000 metre relay at the 2018 Winter Olympics over China. This was Hungary's first ever Winter Olympic gold medal.

Before she was hired by the Hungarian National Skating Federation, she trained the Hungarian brothers Shaolin Sándor Liu and Shaoang Liu in her home province of Jilin with other Chinese youth skaters.
