= Maxime Laoun =

Canadian speed skater (born 1996)

Personal information
- Born: August 12, 1996 (age 29) Montreal, Quebec, Canada
- Height: 1.79 m (5 ft 10 in)

Sport
- Country: Canada
- Sport: Short-track speed skating
Medal record
Men's short-track speed skating
Representing Canada
Olympic Games
Gold medal – first place	2022 Beijing	5000 m relay
World Championships
Gold medal – first place	2025 Beijing	5000 m relay
Gold medal – first place	2026 Montreal	5000 m relay
Bronze medal – third place	2022 Montreal	5000 m relay

Maxime Laoun (born August 12, 1996) is a Canadian short-track speed skater.

== Career ==
=== Junior ===
Laoun first represented Canada on the international stage at the 2014 World Junior Short Track Speed Skating Championships and competed for Canada at the 2015 and 2016 editions. Laoun's top placement came in 2016 when he finished fourth in the 500 metres event.

=== Senior ===
Laoun made his World Cup debut in 2018, helping Canada to a bronze medal in the 5000 metres relay at the Salt Lake City stop.

In November 2019, Laoun was injured, suffering a triple fracture to his tibia and fibula, and underwent three surgeries and rehab to return to training in May 2020.

On January 18, 2022, Laoun was named to Canada's 2022 Olympic team. Laoun won a gold medal as part of Canada's team in the 5000 m relay event.

On December 17, 2025, Laoun was named to Canada's 2026 Olympic team.
