= 2021–22 ISU Short Track Speed Skating World Cup =

International speed skating competition

- Dates: 21 October 2021 – 28 November 2021

The 2021–22 ISU Short Track Speed Skating World Cup is a multi-race tournament over a season for short track speed skating. The season began on 21 October 2021 in China and ended on 28 November 2021 in Netherlands. The World Cup is organised by the ISU who also runs world cups and championships in speed skating and figure skating.

The World Cup consisted of four competitions this year.

== Calendar ==
=== Men ===
==== Beijing 21–24 October 2021 ====
Date	Place	Distance	Winner	Second	Third	Reference
23 October 2021	Capital Indoor Stadium	500m	(Hungary) Shaolin Sándor Liu	(Hungary) John-Henry Krueger	(Kazakhstan) Denis Nikisha	
24 October 2021	Capital Indoor Stadium	1000m	(South Korea) Hwang Dae-heon	(Russia) Semen Elistratov	(Canada) Pascal Dion	
23 October 2021	Capital Indoor Stadium	1500m	(Russia) Semen Elistratov	(Kazakhstan) Adil Galiakhmetov	(China) An Kai	
24 October 2021	Capital Indoor Stadium	5000m relay	Netherlands	Hungary	Italy	

==== Nagoya 28–31 October 2021 ====
Date	Place	Distance	Winner	Second	Third	Reference
30 October 2021	Nippon Gaishi Arena	500m	(South Korea) Hwang Dae-heon	(China) Ren Ziwei	(Kazakhstan) Denis Nikisha	
31 October 2021	Nippon Gaishi Arena	1000m	(China) Ren Ziwei	(Netherlands) Itzhak de Laat	(Canada) Pascal Dion	
30 October 2021	Nippon Gaishi Arena	1500m	(Italy) Yuri Confortola	(South Korea) Hwang Dae-heon	(China) Sun Long	
31 October 2021	Nippon Gaishi Arena	5000m relay	Canada	China	Hungary	

==== Debrecen 18–21 November 2021 ====
Date	Place	Distance	Winner	Second	Third	Reference
20 November 2021	Főnix Hall	500m	(Hungary) Shaolin Sándor Liu	(Hungary) Shaoang Liu	(China) Ren Ziwei	
21 November 2021	Főnix Hall	1000m	(South Korea) Hwang Dae-heon	(Canada) Pascal Dion	(Netherlands) Itzhak de Laat	
20 November 2021	Főnix Hall	1500m	(China) Ren Ziwei	(Canada) Pascal Dion	(South Korea) Jang Hyuk	
21 November 2021	Főnix Hall	5000m relay	Canada	South Korea	Hungary	

==== Dordrecht 25–28 November 2021 ====
Date	Place	Distance	Winner	Second	Third	Reference
27 November 2021	Sportboulevard Dordrecht	500m	(China) Wu Dajing	(Canada) Steven Dubois	(Russia) Konstantin Ivliev	
28 November 2021	Sportboulevard Dordrecht	1000m	(Hungary) Shaoang Liu	(Hungary) John-Henry Krueger	(Italy) Pietro Sighel	
27 November 2021	Sportboulevard Dordrecht	1500m	(China) Ren Ziwei	(Netherlands) Sjinkie Knegt	(South Korea) Park Jang-hyuk	
28 November 2021	Sportboulevard Dordrecht	5000m relay	South Korea	Canada	Hungary	

=== Women ===
==== Beijing 21–24 October 2021 ====
Date	Place	Distance	Winner	Second	Third	Reference
23 October 2021	Capital Indoor Stadium	500m	(Poland) Natalia Maliszewska	(Italy) Arianna Fontana	(South Korea) Choi Min-jeong	
24 October 2021	Capital Indoor Stadium	1000m	(Netherlands) Suzanne Schulting	(South Korea) Kim Ji-yoo	(United States) Kristen Santos	
23 October 2021	Capital Indoor Stadium	1500m	(South Korea) Lee Yu-bin	(Canada) Courtney Sarault	(United States) Kristen Santos	
24 October 2021	Capital Indoor Stadium	3000m relay	China	Netherlands	South Korea	

==== Nagoya 28–31 October 2021 ====
Date	Place	Distance	Winner	Second	Third	Reference
30 October 2021	Nippon Gaishi Arena	500m	(Italy) Arianna Fontana	(Poland) Natalia Maliszewska	(China) Fan Kexin	
31 October 2021	Nippon Gaishi Arena	1000m	(United States) Kristen Santos	(Netherlands) Suzanne Schulting	(Netherlands) Xandra Velzeboer	
30 October 2021	Nippon Gaishi Arena	1500m	(Netherlands) Suzanne Schulting	(Italy) Arianna Fontana	(South Korea) Kim A-lang	
31 October 2021	Nippon Gaishi Arena	3000m relay	Netherlands	South Korea	Italy	

==== Debrecen 18–21 November 2021 ====
Date	Place	Distance	Winner	Second	Third	Reference
20 November 2021	Főnix Hall	500m	(Netherlands) Suzanne Schulting	(Italy) Arianna Fontana	(Canada) Kim Boutin	
21 November 2021	Főnix Hall	1000m	(Netherlands) Suzanne Schulting	(South Korea) Choi Min-jeong	(Poland) Natalia Maliszewska	
20 November 2021	Főnix Hall	1500m	(Netherlands) Suzanne Schulting	(South Korea) Lee Yu-bin	(Canada) Courtney Sarault	
21 November 2021	Főnix Hall	3000m relay	Netherlands	Canada	China	

==== Dordrecht 25–28 November 2021 ====
Date	Place	Distance	Winner	Second	Third	Reference
27 November 2021	Sportboulevard Dordrecht	500m	(Canada) Kim Boutin	(Italy) Arianna Fontana	(Russia) Elena Seregina	
28 November 2021	Sportboulevard Dordrecht	1000m	(South Korea) Choi Min-jeong	(Canada) Kim Boutin	(Netherlands) Suzanne Schulting	
27 November 2021	Sportboulevard Dordrecht	1500m	(South Korea) Lee Yu-bin	(Canada) Courtney Sarault	(Netherlands) Suzanne Schulting	
28 November 2021	Sportboulevard Dordrecht	3000m relay	Netherlands	Canada	Italy	

=== Mixed ===
==== Beijing 21–24 October 2021 ====
Date	Place	Distance	Winner	Second	Third	Reference
24 October 2021	Capital Indoor Stadium	2000m relay	China	Netherlands	South Korea	

==== Nagoya 28–31 October 2021 ====
Date	Place	Distance	Winner	Second	Third	Reference
31 October 2021	Nippon Gaishi Arena	2000m relay	Russia	China	Hungary	

==== Debrecen 18–21 November 2021 ====
Date	Place	Distance	Winner	Second	Third	Reference
21 November 2021	Főnix Hall	2000m relay	China	Canada	France	

==== Dordrecht 25–28 November 2021 ====
Date	Place	Distance	Winner	Second	Third	Reference
28 November 2021	Sportboulevard Dordrecht	2000m relay	Netherlands	Hungary	China	

== World Cup standings ==
=== Men's 500 metres ===
Final standings after 4 events

Pos	Athlete	Points
1.	Shaolin Sándor Liu (HUN)	25120
2.	Wu Dajing (CHN)	20240
3.	Ren Ziwei (CHN)	17677
4.	Shaoang Liu (HUN)	16192
5.	Hwang Dae-heon (KOR)	15438

=== Women's 500 metres ===
Final standings after 4 events

Pos	Athlete	Points
1.	Arianna Fontana (ITA)	26000
2.	Kim Boutin (CAN)	21520
3.	Natalia Maliszewska (POL)	21277
4.	Suzanne Schulting (NED)	19216
5.	Kexin Fan (CHN)	11019

=== Men's 1000 metres ===
Final standings after 4 events

Pos	Athlete	Points
1.	Pascal Dion (CAN)	20800
2.	Hwang Dae-heon (KOR)	20115
3.	Itzhak de Laat (NED)	16078
4.	Semen Elistratov (RUS)	11480
5.	John-Henry Krueger (HUN)	10721

=== Women's 1000 metres ===
Final standings after 4 events

Pos	Athlete	Points
1.	Suzanne Schulting (NED)	28000
2.	Kristen Santos (USA)	19677
3.	Choi Min-jeong (KOR)	18144
4.	Xandra Velzeboer (NED)	15616
5.	Courtney Sarault (CAN)	14336

=== Men's 1500 metres ===
Final standings after 4 events

Pos	Athlete	Points
1.	Ren Ziwei (CHN)	21678
2.	Semen Elistratov (RUS)	17741
3.	Park Jang Hyuk (KOR)	15421
4.	Sjinkie Knegt (NED)	12102
5.	Sun Long (CHN)	11642

=== Women's 1500 metres ===
Final standings after 4 events

Pos	Athlete	Points
1.	Lee Yu-bin (KOR)	28000
2.	Suzanne Schulting (NED)	26400
3.	Courtney Sarault (CAN)	22400
4.	Kristen Santos (USA)	16640
5.	Arianna Fontana (ITA)	15741

=== Men's 5000 metre relay ===
Final standings after 4 events

Pos	Athlete	Points
1	Canada	28000
2	(South Korea) Korea	22096
3	Hungary	20800
4	China	18240
5	Italy	15616

=== Women's 3000 metre relay ===
Final standings after 4 events

Pos	Athlete	Points
1	Netherlands	30000
2	South Korea	19520
3	Canada	19277
4	China	18497
5	Italy	17920

=== Mixed 2000 metre relay ===
Final standings after 4 events

Pos	Country	Points
1	China	28000
2	Netherlands	21277
3	Hungary	19520
4	Russia	15979
5	Canada	14717

== See also ==
- Short track speed skating at the 2022 Winter Olympics
- 2022 World Short Track Speed Skating Championships
