= Tommaso Dotti =

Italian short-track speed skater

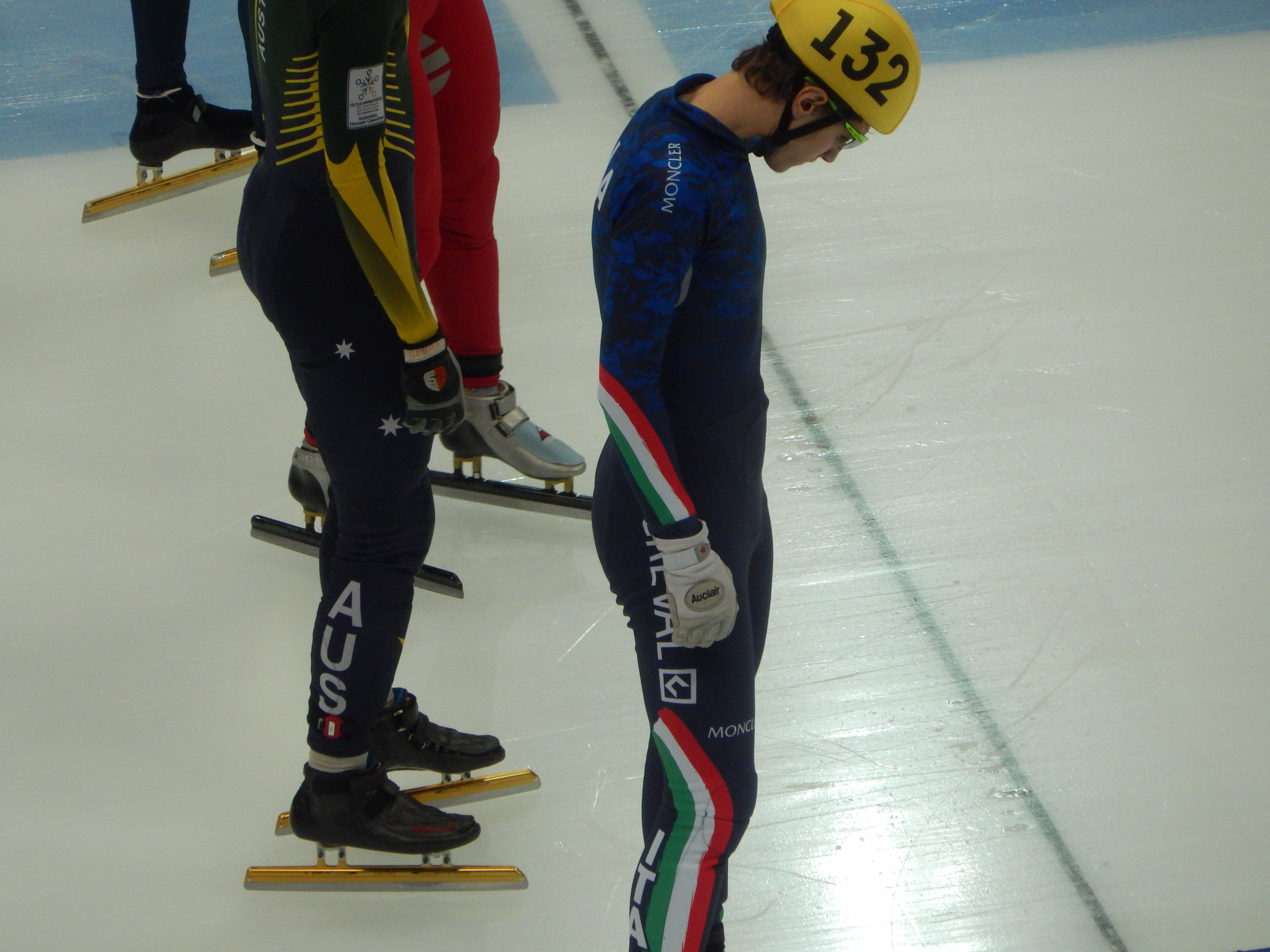
- Dotti in 2015

Personal information
- Nationality: Italian
- Born: 11 July 1993 (age 32) Milan, Italy
- Height: 187 cm (6 ft 2 in)
- Weight: 79 kg (174 lb)

Sport
- Country: Italy
- Sport: Short track speed skating
- Club: GS Fiamme Oro
- Coached by: Kenan Gouadec, Eric Bedard
Medal record
Men's short-track speed skating
Representing Italy
Olympic Games
Bronze medal – third place	2022 Beijing	5000 m relay
World Championships
Silver medal – second place	2023 Seoul	5000 m relay
Bronze medal – third place	2021 Dordrecht	5000 m relay
European Championships
Silver medal – second place	2023 Gdańsk	5000 m relay
Bronze medal – third place	2017 Turin	5000 m relay
Bronze medal – third place	2020 Debrecen	5000 m relay

Tommaso Dotti (born 11 July 1993) is an Italian male short track speed skater.
