= Park Jang-hyuk =

South Korean short track speed skater

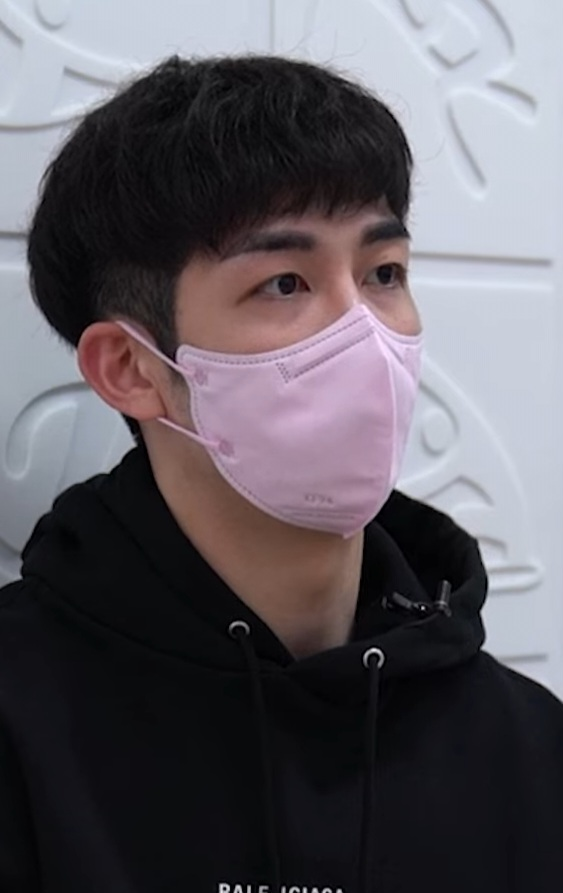
- Park in 2022

Personal information
- Born: 31 October 1998 (age 27) Seoul, South Korea

Sport
- Country: South Korea
- Sport: Short track speed skating
- Events: 500 m; 1000 m; 1500 m; 5000 m Relay
- College team: Korea National Sport University
Medal record
Men's short track speed skating
Representing South Korea
Olympic Games
Silver medal – second place	2022 Beijing	5000 m relay
World Cup
Silver medal – second place	2021–22 Final	5000 m relay
Bronze medal – third place	2021–22 Final	1500 m

Park Jang-hyuk (Korean: 박장혁; born 31 October 1998) is a South Korean short track speed skater. He won a silver medal at the 2022 Winter Olympics in the men's 5000 metre relay.

== Filmography ==
=== Television show ===
Year	Title	Role	Notes	Ref.
2022	Radio Star	Guest	Episode 759, with Kwak Yoon-gy, Hwang Dae-heon, Kim Dong-wook and Lee June-seo	
