= Lee June-seo =

South Korean speed skater (born 2000)

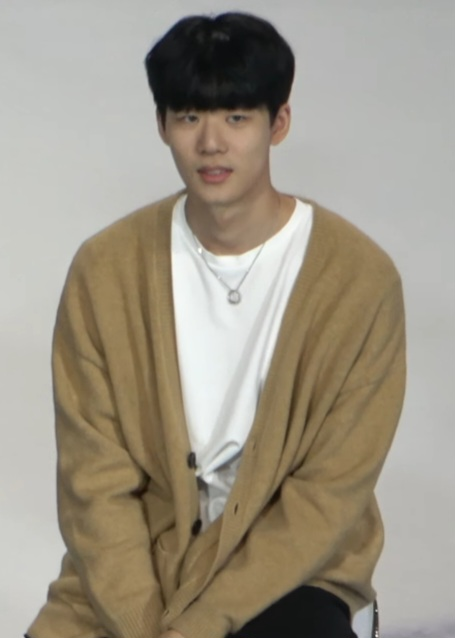
- Lee in 2022

Personal information
- Born: 3 June 2000 (age 26) Daejeon, South Korea

Sport
- Country: South Korea
- Sport: Short-track speed skating
- Club: Korea National Sport University
Medal record
Men's short-track speed skating
Representing South Korea
Olympic Games
Silver medal – second place	2022 Beijing	5000 m relay
Silver medal – second place	2026 Milano Cortina	5000 m relay
World Championships
Gold medal – first place	2019 Sofia	5000 m relay
Gold medal – first place	2022 Montreal	5000 m relay
Silver medal – second place	2022 Montreal	1000 m
Bronze medal – third place	2019 Sofia	1500 m
Bronze medal – third place	2022 Montreal	Overall
Bronze medal – third place	2023 Seoul	5000 m relay
Winter Universiade
Gold medal – first place	2023 Lake Placid	5000 m relay
World Junior Championships
Gold medal – first place	2018 Tomaszów Mazowiecki	500 m
Silver medal – second place	2018 Tomaszów Mazowiecki	Overall
Bronze medal – third place	2018 Tomaszów Mazowiecki	1500 m

Lee June-seo (Korean: 이준서; born 3 June 2000) is a South Korean short track speed skater. He is a two-time Winter Olympic silver medalist in the 5000 m relay (2022, 2026).

He participated at the 2019 World Short Track Speed Skating Championships, winning a medal.

== Filmography ==
=== Television show ===
Year	Title	Role	Notes	Ref.
2022	Radio Star	Guest	Episode 759, with Kwak Yoon-gy, Hwang Dae-heon, Kim Dong-wook and Park Jang-hyuk	
