= Ryan Pivirotto =

American short track speed skater

Personal information
- Full name: Ryan Alexander Pivirotto
- Born: May 4, 1995 (age 31) Ann Arbor, Michigan, U.S.
- Height: 5 ft 5 in (165 cm)

Sport
- Country: United States
- Sport: Short track speed skating

Ryan Alexander Pivirotto (born May 14, 1995) is an American short track speed skater.

== Career ==
Pivirotto won a bronze medal at the 2020 Four Continents Short Track Speed Skating Championships in the 5000 metre relay.

Pivirotto was named to the roster for the United States at the 2018 Winter Olympics, however, he did not compete in any events. He represented the United States at the 2022 Winter Olympics.
