= Shaoang Liu =

Hungarian-Chinese speed skater (born 1998)

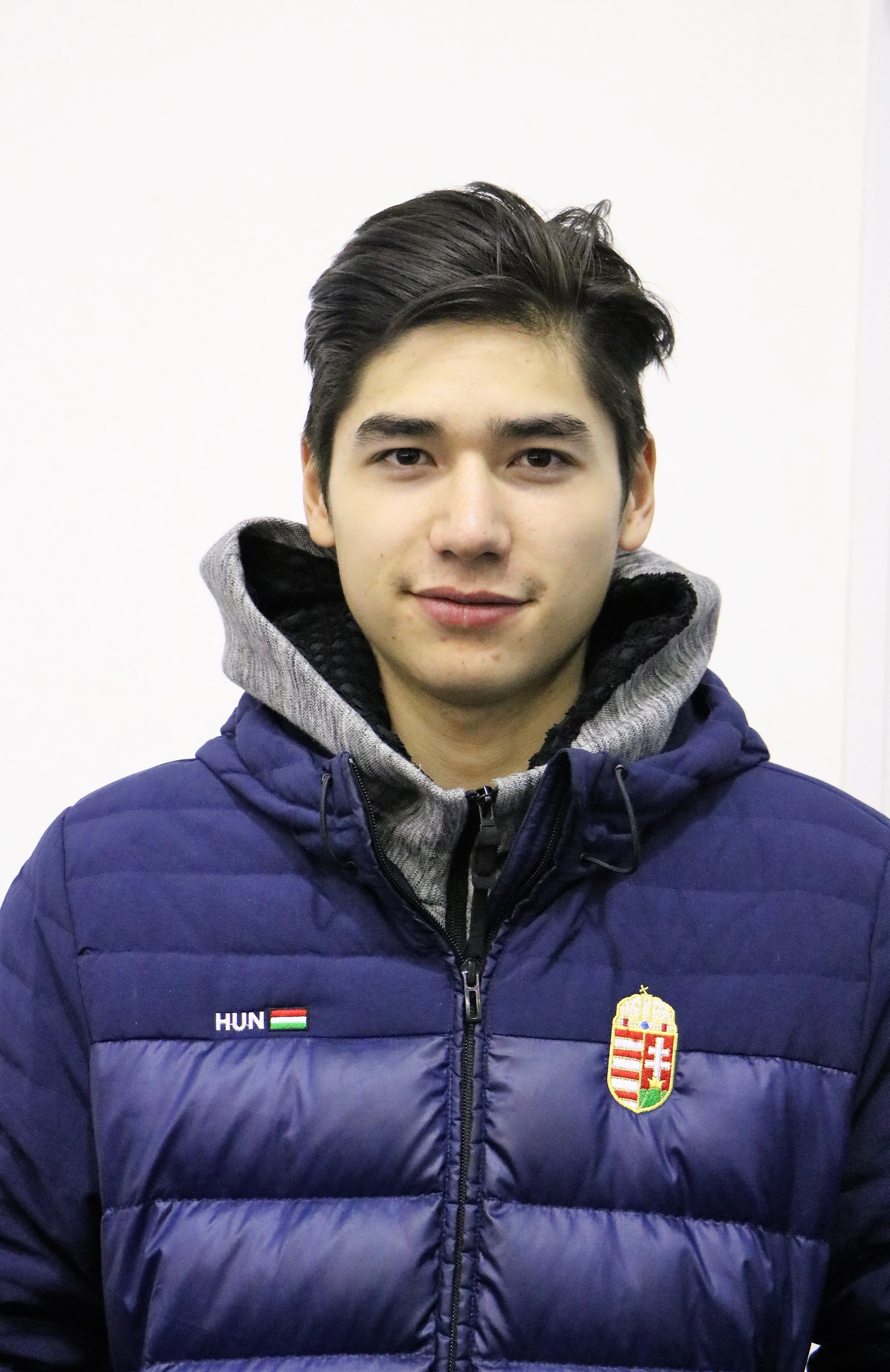
- Liu in 2017

Personal information
- Nickname: Ádó
- Nationality: Chinese
- Born: 13 March 1998 (age 28) Budapest, Hungary
- Height: 1.82 m (6 ft 0 in)
- Weight: 78 kg (172 lb)

Sport
- Country: Hungary (2015–2022); China (2023–)
- Sport: Short track speed skating
- Club: Tianjin Winter and Water Sports Management Center
- Coached by: Zhang Jing (speed skater)

Achievements and titles
- Personal bests: 500 m: 39.699 (2018); 1,000 m: 1:23.021 (2016); 1,500 m: 2:12.826 (2018); 3,000 m: 4:46.026 (2019)
Medal record
Men's short track speed skating
Event	1st	2nd	3rd
Olympic Games	2	0	2
World Championships	8	6	3
European Championships	4	8	1
Total	14	14	6
Representing China
World Championships
Gold medal – first place	2024 Rotterdam	5000 m relay
Gold medal – first place	2024 Rotterdam	2000 m mixed relay
Silver medal – second place	2025 Beijing	5000 m relay
Bronze medal – third place	2025 Beijing	1500 m
Asian Games
Bronze medal – third place	2025 Harbin	1000 m
Bronze medal – third place	2025 Harbin	5000 m relay
Representing Hungary
Olympic Games
Gold medal – first place	2018 Pyeongchang	5000 m relay
Gold medal – first place	2022 Beijing	500 m
Bronze medal – third place	2022 Beijing	1000 m
Bronze medal – third place	2022 Beijing	2000 m mixed relay
World Championships
Gold medal – first place	2021 Dordrecht	Overall
Gold medal – first place	2021 Dordrecht	500 m
Gold medal – first place	2022 Montréal	Overall
Gold medal – first place	2022 Montréal	500 m
Gold medal – first place	2022 Montréal	1000 m
Gold medal – first place	2022 Montréal	1500 m
Silver medal – second place	2015 Moscow	5000 m relay
Silver medal – second place	2016 Seoul	1500 m
Silver medal – second place	2017 Rotterdam	1000 m
Silver medal – second place	2021 Dordrecht	1000 m
Silver medal – second place	2021 Dordrecht	5000 m relay
Bronze medal – third place	2016 Seoul	500 m
Bronze medal – third place	2017 Rotterdam	5000 m relay
European Championships
Gold medal – first place	2019 Dordrecht	500 m
Gold medal – first place	2019 Dordrecht	5000 m relay
Gold medal – first place	2020 Debrecen	Overall
Gold medal – first place	2020 Debrecen	1500 m
Silver medal – second place	2015 Dordrecht	5000 m relay
Silver medal – second place	2016 Sochi	5000 m relay
Silver medal – second place	2017 Turin	1000 m
Silver medal – second place	2017 Turin	1500 m
Silver medal – second place	2019 Dordrecht	Overall
Silver medal – second place	2019 Dordrecht	1500 m
Silver medal – second place	2020 Debrecen	500 m
Silver medal – second place	2020 Debrecen	1000 m
Bronze medal – third place	2018 Dresden	5000 m relay
Youth Olympic Games
Bronze medal – third place	2016 Lillehammer	1000 m

Shaoang Liu
- Simplified Chinese: 刘少昂
- Traditional Chinese: 劉少昂
Transcriptions
Standard Mandarin
- Hanyu Pinyin: Liú Shào'áng
- IPA: [ljǒʊ ʂâʊ ǎŋ]

Shaoang Liu (Note: Chinese: 刘少昂; pinyin: Liú Shào'áng; Mandarin pronunciation: [ljǒʊ ʂâʊ ǎŋ]) (born 13 March 1998) is a Hungarian-born Chinese Olympic gold medalist short track speed skater. He is the younger brother of teammate Shaolin Sándor Liu, and has won two golds and two bronzes representing Hungary at the Winter Olympics in 2018 and 2022 in short track speed skating. The gold medals were the first-ever team gold, and the first ever individual gold at the Winter Olympics for Hungary. Since 2023, Liu has represented China.

== Early life ==
Liu was born to a Chinese father and a Hungarian mother in Budapest on 13 March 1998. Before taking up skating, Liu and his brother Shaolin swam for two years, but they frequently got colds as a result. After looking for different sports to compete in, they took up short track speed skating in 2006.

In 2006, the World Championships were held in Hungary. Their father assisted the Chinese team during their stay, helping with their stay and guiding them around. After the Chinese team suggested his two sons should go train in China due to their half-Chinese ethnicity, Liu's father agreed to take the boys to China in 2006 where they trained for one and a half years. After returning from China, they began to win various minor European competitions. In 2012, Zhang Jing came from China to coach Liu and his brother.

He studied sports management at the University of Debrecen.

== Career ==
At the 2018 Winter Olympics held in At Pyeongchang, Liu represented Hungary in short track speed skating. 2018, he won gold with Team Hungary in the 5000 m men's relay, whose winning time was a world record. This team gold was also the first ever gold medal won at the Winter Olympics by Hungary.

At the 2022 Winter Olympics held in Beijing, he became Hungary's most successful winter Olympian in 2022 after winning two bronze medals and one gold at the Beijing Olympics in 2022. He won a gold in 500 m, having led from start to finish. This win was the first ever individual gold medal at the Winter Olympics for Hungary. He won an individual bronze in the 1,000 m, and as part of the team in the 2,000m mixed relay.

In November 2022, Liu and his brother requested consent from the Hungarian National Skating Federation to allow them to change nationality, a request which was granted in December, but they would need to sit out of competing for 12 months after when the nationality would be changed.

== See also ==
- List of Olympic medalist families
