= Pascal Dion =

Canadian short-track speed skater (born 1994)

Personal information
- Nationality: Canadian
- Born: August 8, 1994 (age 31) Montreal, Quebec
- Height: 1.72 m (5 ft 8 in)
- Weight: 69 kg (152 lb)

Sport
- Country: Canada
- Sport: Short track speed skating
Medal record
Men's short track speed skating
Representing Canada
Olympic Games
Gold medal – first place	2022 Beijing	5000 m relay
Bronze medal – third place	2018 Pyeongchang	5000 m relay
World Championships
Silver medal – second place	2022 Montreal	Overall
Silver medal – second place	2022 Montreal	1500 m
Silver medal – second place	2018 Montreal	5000 m relay
Bronze medal – third place	2022 Montreal	5000 m relay
Bronze medal – third place	2023 Seoul	1500 m

Pascal Dion (born December 22, 1994) is a Canadian former short-track speed skater and Olympic gold medalist.

== Career ==
=== 2015 ===
Dion competed at the 2015 Winter Universiade in Granada, Spain, where he finished in fourth place in the 1,500 m event.

=== 2016 ===
As part of the 2015–16 ISU Short Track Speed Skating World Cup, Dion won his first medal as part of the 5,000 m relay team.

=== 2017 ===
Dion was named to Canada's 2018 Olympic team in August 2017. This marked his Olympic debut. Dion would win the bronze medal as part of the 5000 m relay team.

=== 2022 ===
On January 17, 2022, Dion was named to Canada's 2022 Olympic team. Dion won a gold medal as part of Canada's team in the 5000 m relay event. Later in the season, Dion would win his first individual World Championships medal, a silver in the 1500 m.

=== 2024 ===
Dion announced his retirement in June 2024.
