= Shaolin Sándor Liu =

Hungarian speed skater (born 1995)

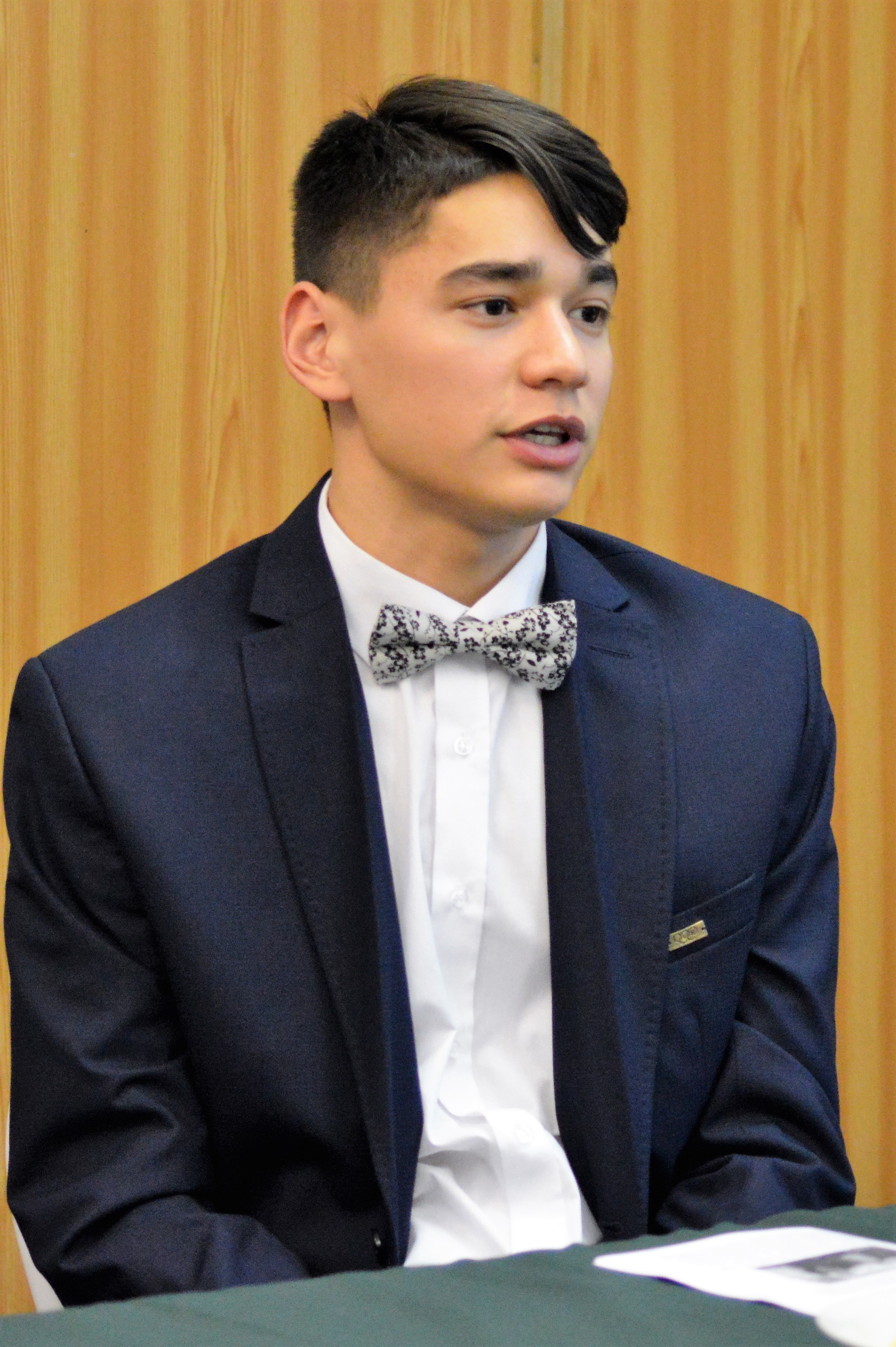
- Liu in 2014

Personal information
- Born: 20 November 1995 (age 30) Budapest, Hungary
- Height: 1.81 m (5 ft 11 in)
- Weight: 76 kg (168 lb)

Sport
- Country: Hungary (2013–2022); China (2023–)
- Sport: Short track speed skating
- Club: Ferencvárosi Torna Club (2019-2022); Tianjin Winter and Water Sports Management Center (2022-)
- Coached by: Zhang Jing (speed skater)

Achievements and titles
- Personal bests: 500 m: 39.732 (2019); 1,000 m: 1:22.490 (2023); 1,500 m: 2:09.213 (2022); 3,000 m: 4:46.110 (2019)
Medal record
Event	1st	2nd	3rd
Olympic Games	1	0	1
World Championships	3	5	3
European Championships	6	8	2
Total	10	13	6
Representing China
World Championships
Gold medal – first place	2024 Rotterdam	5000 m relay
Asian Games
Bronze medal – third place	2025 Harbin	5000 m relay
Representing Hungary
Olympic Games
Gold medal – first place	2018 Pyeongchang	5000 m relay
Bronze medal – third place	2022 Beijing	2000 m mixed relay
World Championships
Gold medal – first place	2016 Seoul	500 m
Gold medal – first place	2021 Dordrecht	1000 m
Silver medal – second place	2015 Moscow	500 m
Silver medal – second place	2015 Moscow	5000 m relay
Silver medal – second place	2018 Montreal	Overall
Silver medal – second place	2021 Dordrecht	Overall
Silver medal – second place	2021 Dordrecht	5000 m relay
Bronze medal – third place	2016 Seoul	Overall
Bronze medal – third place	2017 Rotterdam	5000 m relay
Bronze medal – third place	2019 Sofia	5000 m relay
European Championships
Gold medal – first place	2017 Turin	1000 m
Gold medal – first place	2019 Dordrecht	Overall
Gold medal – first place	2019 Dordrecht	1500 m
Gold medal – first place	2019 Dordrecht	5000 m relay
Gold medal – first place	2020 Debrecen	500 m
Gold medal – first place	2020 Debrecen	1000 m
Silver medal – second place	2015 Dordrecht	5000 m relay
Silver medal – second place	2016 Sochi	1000 m
Silver medal – second place	2016 Sochi	1500 m
Silver medal – second place	2016 Sochi	5000 m relay
Silver medal – second place	2017 Turin	Overall
Silver medal – second place	2019 Dordrecht	500 m
Silver medal – second place	2019 Dordrecht	1000 m
Silver medal – second place	2020 Debrecen	Overall
Bronze medal – third place	2013 Malmö	5000 m relay
Bronze medal – third place	2018 Dresden	5000 m relay
World Junior Championships
Gold medal – first place	2014 Erzurum	500 m
Silver medal – second place	2013 Warsaw	1000 m
Bronze medal – third place	2014 Erzurum	Overall
Bronze medal – third place	2014 Erzurum	1000 m

Shaolin Sándor Liu
- Simplified Chinese: 刘少林
- Traditional Chinese: 劉少林
Transcriptions
Standard Mandarin
- Hanyu Pinyin: Liú Shàolín
- IPA: [ljǒʊ ʂâʊ lǐn]

Shaolin Sándor Liu (Note: Chinese: 劉少林; pinyin: Liú Shàolín; Mandarin pronunciation: [ljǒʊ ʂâʊ lǐn]) (born 20 November 1995) is a Chinese-Hungarian Olympic champion short track speed skater. He has won one gold and one bronze as part of the Hungarian team in short track speed skating relays at the 2018 and 2022 Winter Olympics. He has represented China internationally since 2023.

== Career ==
Born and raised in Hungary to a Chinese father and a Hungarian mother, Liu started the sport in 2006. Before taking up skating, Liu and his brother Shaoang swam for two years, but they frequently got colds as a result. After looking for different sports to compete in, they took up short track speed skating.

In 2006, the World Championships were held in Hungary. Their father assisted the Chinese team during their stay, helping with their stay and guiding them around. After the Chinese team suggested his two sons should go train in China due to their half-Chinese ethnicity, Liu's father agreed to take the boys to China, where they trained for one and a half years. After returning from China, they began to win various minor European competitions. In 2012, Zhang Jing came from China to coach Liu and his brother.

Liu represented Hungary at the 2014 Winter Olympics. He has won multiple medals at the World Junior Short Track Speed Skating Championships, and placed third overall at the 2016 World Short Track Speed Skating Championships.

He finished in fifth position at the 2018 Winter Olympics in the men's 1500 m event before winning gold in the 5000 m relay, which was also Hungary's first-ever Winter Olympics title.

At the 2022 Winter Olympics held in Beijing, Liu was disqualified for an infringement despite finishing first in the men's 1000m final. He won a bronze in the mixed 2000 m relay.

In November 2022, Liu and his brother requested consent from the Hungarian National Skating Federation to allow them to change nationality, a request which was granted a month later in December, but they would need to sit out for 12 months with the change in nationality.

== Personal life ==
Liu's younger brother Shaoang Liu is also a short track speed skater. He was second in the 1500 m, third in the 500 m, and fifth overall at the 2016 World Short Track Speed Skating Championships. Though born to a Chinese father from Tianjin, Liu speaks Chinese with a noticeable Northeastern accent due to his year and a half spent in the Northeastern region of China. He was in a relationship with fellow speed skater Elise Christie from 2015 to 2018.

== See also ==
- List of Olympic medalist families

== Notes ==
Awards
Preceded by Balázs Baji	Hungarian Sportsman of The Year; 2018	Succeeded by Kristóf Milák
