= Hwang Dae-heon =

South Korean speed skater (born 1999)

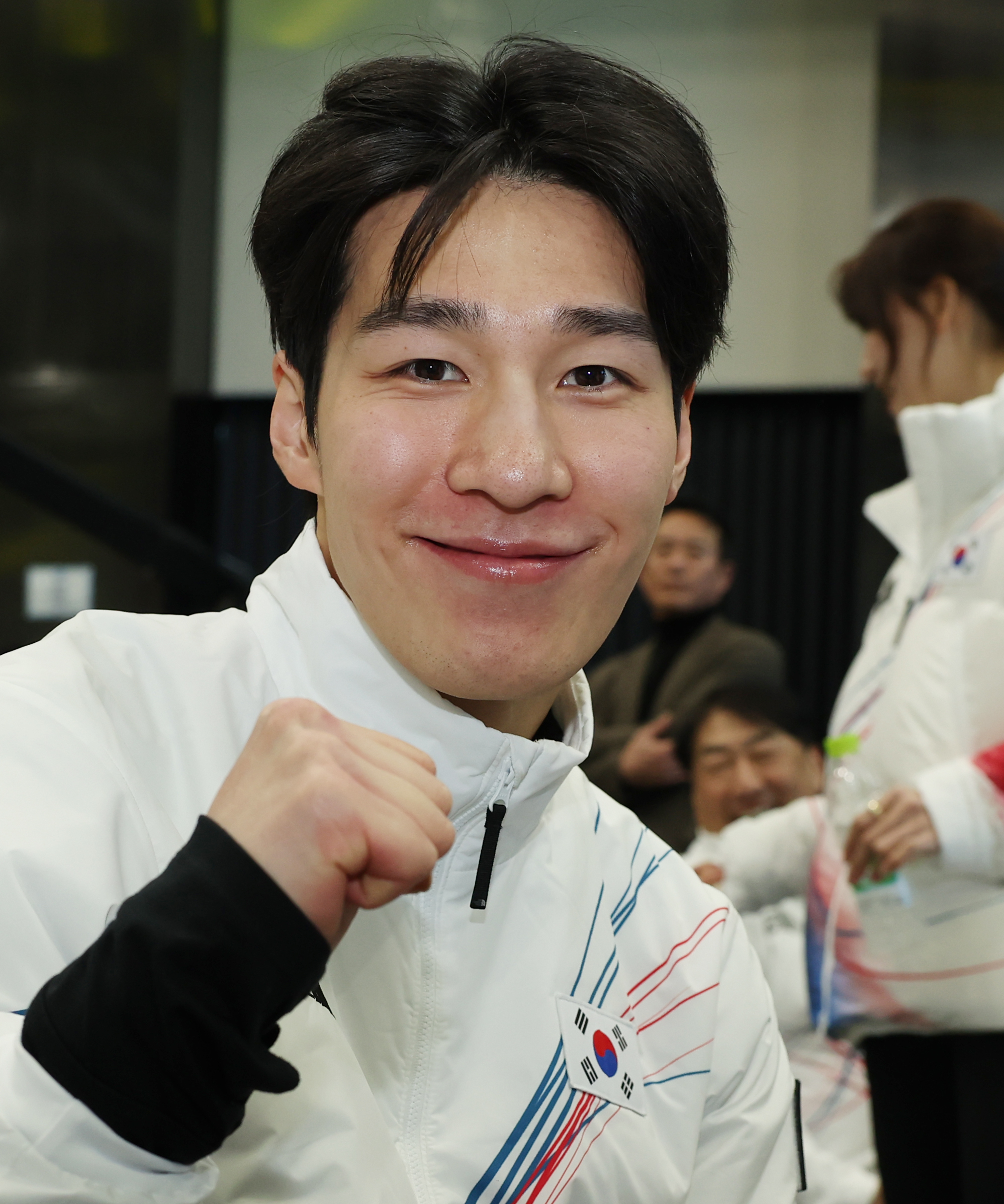

Personal information
- Nationality: South Korean
- Born: 5 July 1999 (age 27) Anyang, South Korea
- Height: 1.80 m (5 ft 11 in)
- Weight: 73 kg (161 lb)

Korean name
- Hangul: 황대헌
- Hanja: 黃大憲
- RR: Hwang Daeheon
- MR: Hwang Taehŏn

Sport
- Country: South Korea
- Sport: Short track speed skating
- Events: 500 m; 1000 m; 1500 m; 5000 m Relay
- Club: Korea National Sport University

Achievements and titles
- Personal bests: 500 m: 39.688 (2019); 1,000 m: 1:20.875 WR (2016); 1,500 m: 2:09.219 (2022); 3,000 m: 5:40.218 (2018)
Medal record
Men's short track speed skating
Representing South Korea
Olympic Games
Gold medal – first place	2022 Beijing	1500 m
Silver medal – second place	2018 Pyeongchang	500 m
Silver medal – second place	2022 Beijing	5000 m relay
Silver medal – second place	2026 Milano Cortina	1500 m
Silver medal – second place	2026 Milan-Cortina	5000 m relay
World Championships
Gold medal – first place	2018 Montreal	500 m
Gold medal – first place	2018 Montreal	5000 m relay
Gold medal – first place	2019 Sofia	500 m
Gold medal – first place	2019 Sofia	5000 m relay
Silver medal – second place	2019 Sofia	Overall
Silver medal – second place	2019 Sofia	1000 m
Silver medal – second place	2024 Rotterdam	5000 m relay
Bronze medal – third place	2018 Montreal	Overall
Youth Olympic Games
Gold medal – first place	2016 Lillehammer	1000 m

Hwang Dae-heon (Korean: 황대헌; born 5 July 1999) is a South Korean short track speed skater. He also currently holds the world record in men's 1000 metres short track speed skating.

He represented South Korea in the 2018 Winter Olympics and won the silver medal in the men's 500 metres short track speed skating.

In the 2022 Winter Olympics, he won the gold medal in the 1500 metres event and the silver medal in the 5000 metres relay event of men's short track speed skating while on the South Korean team. During the games he also set the Olympic record for the men's 1000 metres event.

Hwang withdrew from the 2021–22 season world championships after getting infected with COVID-19 in March. He also failed to win any of the qualification events for the 2022–23 season national team due to long covid syndromes.

At the 2026 Winter Olympics, he won two silver medals in the 1500 metres event and 5000 metres relay event.

== Results ==
=== Olympic Games ===
Only top 5 finishes are shown

Year	Location	Event	Position	Ref.
2018	(South Korea) Pyeongchang	500 m	2nd place, silver medalist(s)	
2018	(South Korea) Pyeongchang	5000 m relay	4th	
2022	(China) Beijing	1500 m	1st place, gold medalist(s)	
2022	(China) Beijing	5000 m relay	2nd place, silver medalist(s)	
2026	(Italy) Milano Cortina	1500 m	2nd place, silver medalist(s)	
2026	(Italy) Milano Cortina	5000 m relay	2nd place, silver medalist(s)	

=== World Cup ===
Only top 5 finishes are shown

Season	Event	Position	Ref.
2016–17	1000 m	4th	
2016–17	5000 m relay	5th	
2017–18	500 m	4th	
2017–18	1000 m	3rd place, bronze medalist(s)	
2017–18	1500 m	1st place, gold medalist(s)	
2017–18	5000 m relay	2nd place, silver medalist(s)	
2018–19	500 m	4th	
2018–19	1000 m	5th	
2018–19	Mixed 2000 m relay	5th	
2019–20	1000 m	4th	
2019–20	5000 m relay	2nd place, silver medalist(s)	
2019–20	Mixed 2000 m relay	3rd place, bronze medalist(s)	
2020–21	Cancelled due to COVID-19 pandemic		
2021–22	500 m	5th	
2021–22	1000 m	2nd place, silver medalist(s)	
2021–22	5000 m relay	2nd place, silver medalist(s)	

=== World Championship ===
Only top 5 finishes are shown

Year	Location	Event	Position	Ref.
2018	(Canada) Montreal	500 m	1st place, gold medalist(s)	
2018	(Canada) Montreal	5000 m relay	1st place, gold medalist(s)	
2018	(Canada) Montreal	Overall	3rd place, bronze medalist(s)	
2019	(Bulgaria) Sofia	500 m	1st place, gold medalist(s)	
2019	(Bulgaria) Sofia	1000 m	2nd place, silver medalist(s)	
2019	(Bulgaria) Sofia	5000 m relay	1st place, gold medalist(s)	
2019	(Bulgaria) Sofia	Overall	2nd place, silver medalist(s)	
2020	(South Korea) Seoul	Cancelled due to COVID-19 pandemic		
2021	(Netherlands) Dordrecht	South Korea did not participated due to COVID-19 pandemic		

=== Four Continents Championship ===
Only top 5 finishes are shown

Year	Location	Event	Position	Ref.
2020	(Canada) Montreal	500 m	1st place, gold medalist(s)	
2020	(Canada) Montreal	1000 m	1st place, gold medalist(s)	
2020	(Canada) Montreal	1500 m	1st place, gold medalist(s)	
2020	(Canada) Montreal	5000 m relay	1st place, gold medalist(s)	
2020	(Canada) Montreal	Overall	1st place, gold medalist(s)	
2021	(United States) Salt Lake City	Cancelled due to COVID-19 pandemic		
2022	(United States) Salt Lake City	Cancelled due to COVID-19 pandemic		

== Filmography ==
=== Television show ===
Year	Title	Role	Notes	Ref.
2022	With the Silk of Dohpo Flying	Cast Member	with Kim Jong-kook, Ji Hyun-woo, Noh Sang-hyun and Joo Woo-jae	

== Awards and nominations ==
Name of the award ceremony, year presented, category, nominee of the award, and the result of the nomination
Award ceremony	Year	Category	Nominee / Work	Result	Ref.
Anyang City Youth Award	2022	Anyang City's Youth Award in Athletics	Hwang Dae-heon	Won	

== See also ==
- List of Youth Olympic Games gold medalists who won Olympic gold medals
- List of 2018 Winter Olympics medal winners
- List of 2022 Winter Olympics medal winners
