= Capital Indoor Stadium =

Arena in Beijing

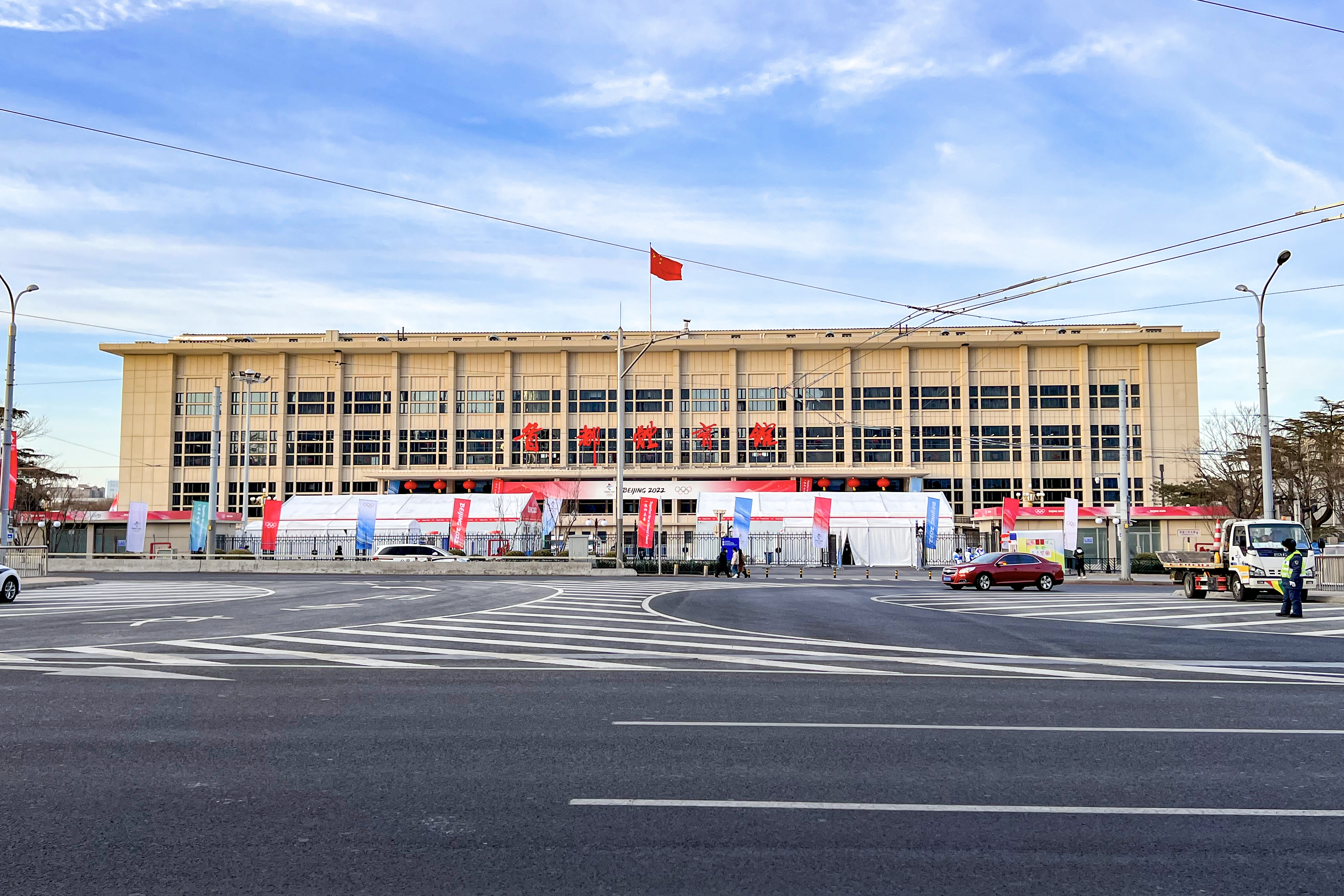
- The arena during the 2022 Winter Olympics
- Interactive map of Capital Indoor Stadium
- Location: Beijing, China
- Coordinates: 39°56′20″N 116°19′16″E
- Capacity: 17,345
- Public transit: National Library

Construction
- Opened: 1968; 58 years ago
- Renovated: 2007, 2021

The Capital Indoor Stadium (simplified Chinese: 首都体育馆; traditional Chinese: 首都體育館; pinyin: Shǒudū Tǐyùguǎn) is an indoor arena in 56 Zhongguancun South Street, Beijing, China, that was built in 1968. It hosted matches between national table tennis teams of China and the United States in 1971; these matches were part of the exchange program known as ping pong diplomacy.

== History ==
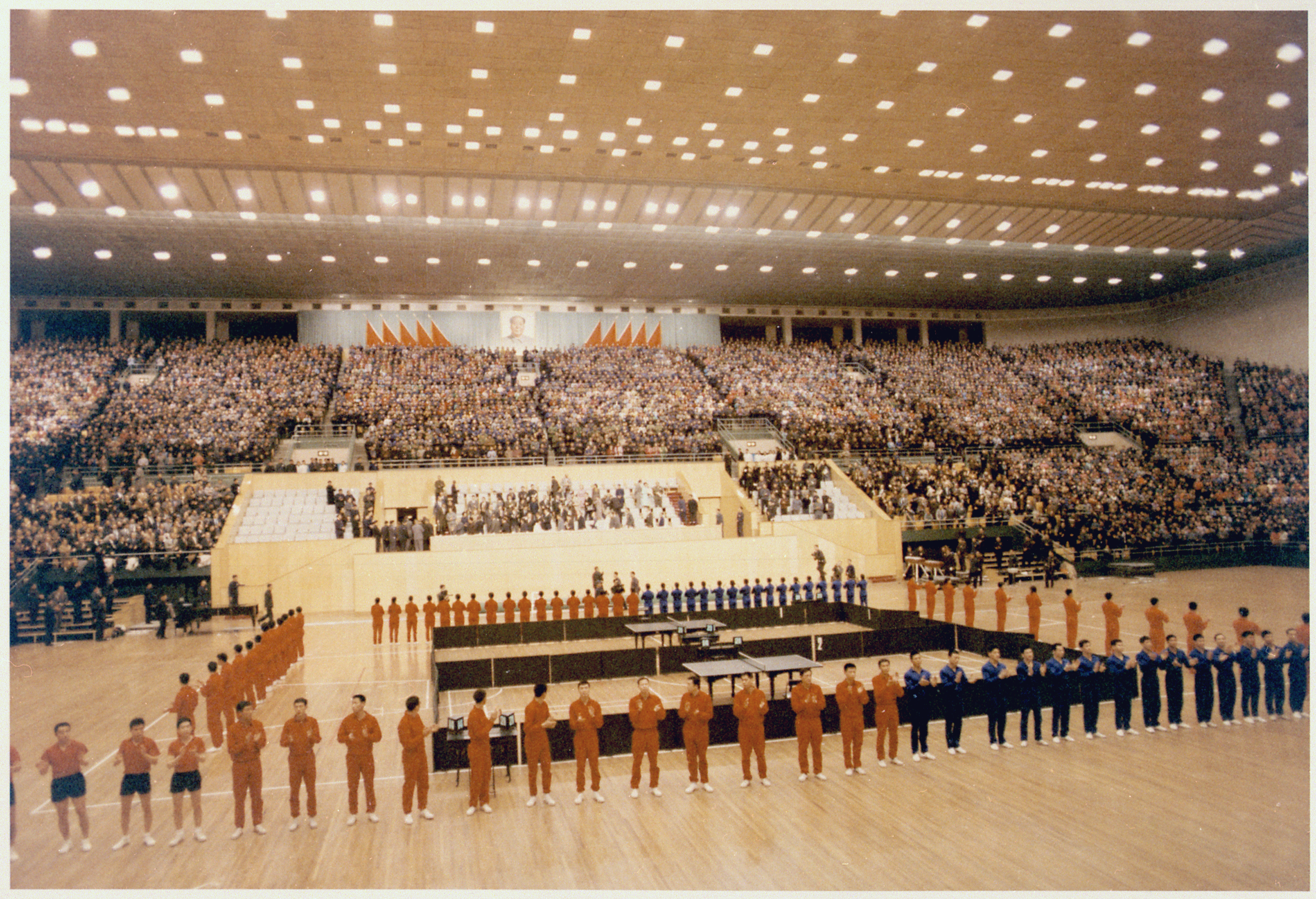
During Nixon's visit to China in 1972, he and Zhou Enlai watched a sports performance organized by the State Physical Culture and Sports Commission at the Capital Gymnasium.

It has a capacity of 15,000 (reduced from the previous 17,345) and a floor space of 54,707 square meters expanded from the original 53,000. It was renovated for the first time between 2000 and 2001 to become a venue for the 2001 Summer Universiade.

It was also the venue for the 1981 Ice Hockey World Championship Pool C tournament, which marked a historic breakthrough for Chinese ice hockey.

The stadium hosted one of the first NBA games in China, hosted on 17 October 2004, in front of a sellout capacity of 17,903. It also hosted the first-ever professional football game featuring all-stars from the Arena Football League to help promote the new AFL China league (now known as the China Arena Football League.

Capital Indoor Stadium underwent a new renovation and expansion that was completed in late 2007 for the 2008 Summer Olympics, where it hosted volleyball tournaments.

The venue hosted the 2017 World Women's Curling Championship. The venue is also used for figure skating and short track speed skating, and was used for these competitions during the 2022 Winter Olympics.

== See also ==
- List of indoor arenas in China
- List of indoor arenas by capacity
