= Chronological summary of the 2022 Winter Olympics =

This is a chronological summary of the major events of the 2022 Winter Olympics in Beijing and venues near neighboring towns of Yanqing and Chongli in the People's Republic of China. Competition began on 2 February with the first matches in the group stages of the curling events. The opening ceremony was held two days later on 4 February. The last day of competition and the closing ceremony were on 20 February.

The games featured 109 events in 7 different sports, encompassing a total of 15 disciplines. New events included men's and women's big air freestyle skiing, women's monobob, mixed team competitions in freestyle skiing aerials, ski jumping, and snowboard cross, and the mixed relay in short track speed skating.

About 91 National Olympic Committees qualified athletes, with Haiti and Saudi Arabia each making their Winter Olympics debuts. As a result of the 2020 ruling by the Court of Arbitration for Sport on the Russian doping scandal, Russian athletes competed in both the 2020 Summer Olympics and the 2022 Winter Olympics under the acronym "ROC" after the name of the Russian Olympic Committee, and under the flag of the Russian Olympic Committee.

== Calendar ==
Competition began two days before the opening ceremony on 2 February, and ended on 20 February 2022. Organizers went through several revisions of the schedule, and each edition needed to be approved by the IOC.

All times and dates use China Standard Time (UTC+8)

OC	Opening ceremony	●	Event competitions	1	Event finals	EG	Exhibition gala	CC	Closing ceremony

February 2022	2nd Wed	3rd Thu	4th Fri	5th Sat	6th Sun	7th Mon	8th Tue	9th Wed	10th Thu	11th Fri	12th Sat	13th Sun	14th Mon	15th Tue	16th Wed	17th Thu	18th Fri	19th Sat	20th Sun	Events
Ceremonies			OC																CC	—N/a
Alpine skiing						2	1	1	1	1		1		1	1	1			1	11
Biathlon				1		1	1			1	1	2		1	1		2			11
Bobsleigh												●	1	1			●	1	1	4
Cross-country skiing				1	1		2		1	1	1	1			2			1	1	12
Curling	●	●	●	●	●	●	1	●	●	●	●	●	●	●	●	●	●	1	1	3
Figure skating			●		●	1	●		1		●		1	●		1	●	1	EG	5
Freestyle skiing		●		1	1	●	1	1	1				1	1	2	1	2	1		13
Ice hockey		●	●	●	●	●	●	●	●	●	●	●	●	●	●	1	●	●	1	2
Luge				●	1	●	1	1	1											4
Nordic combined								1						1		1				3
Short track speed skating				1		2		1		1		2			2					9
Skeleton									●	1	1									2
Ski jumping				1	1	1				●	1		1							5
Snowboarding				●	1	1	2	1	2	1	1		●	2						11
Speed skating				1	1	1	1		1	1	1	1		2		1	1	2		14
Daily medal events	0	0	0	6	6	9	10	6	8	7	6	7	4	9	8	6	5	7	5	109
Cumulative total	0	0	0	6	12	21	31	37	45	52	58	65	69	78	86	92	97	104	109	109
February 2022	2nd Wed	3rd Thu	4th Fri	5th Sat	6th Sun	7th Mon	8th Tue	9th Wed	10th Thu	11th Fri	12th Sat	13th Sun	14th Mon	15th Tue	16th Wed	17th Thu	18th Fri	19th Sat	20th Sun	Total events

== Medal table ==
* Host nation (China)

2022 Winter Olympics medal table
Rank	NOC	Gold	Silver	Bronze	Total
1	Norway	16	8	13	37
2	Germany	12	10	5	27
3	United States‡	9	9	7	25
4	China*	9	4	2	15
5	Sweden	8	5	5	18
6	Netherlands	8	5	4	17
7	Austria	7	7	4	18
8	Switzerland	7	2	6	15
9	ROC‡	5	12	15	32
10	France	5	7	2	14
11–29	Remaining	23	40	47	110
Totals (29 entries)		109	109	110	328

== Day-by-day summaries ==
=== Day (−2) — Wednesday 2 February ===
Curling

- The first matches in the round-robin stage of the mixed doubles tournament.

=== Day (−1) — Thursday 3 February ===
Curling

- Second day of the round-robin stage of the mixed doubles tournament.

Freestyle skiing

- The first day of competition in both the men's moguls and the women's moguls.

Ice hockey

- The first matches in the group stage of the women's tournament.

=== Day 0 — Friday 4 February ===
Curling

- Third day of the round-robin stage of the mixed doubles tournament.

Figure skating

- The first day of competition in the team event.

Ice hockey

- Second day of the group stage of the women's tournament.

Opening ceremony

- The opening ceremony was held at Beijing National Stadium.

=== Day 1 — Saturday 5 February ===
Curling

- Fourth day of the round robin stage of the mixed doubles tournament.

Ice hockey

- Third day of the group stage of the women's tournament.

Luge

- Heats 1 and 2 of the men's singles.

Short track speed skating

- The first day of competition in both the men's 1000 metres and the women's 500 metres.

Ski jumping

- The first day of competition in the men's normal hill individual.

Snowboarding

- The first day of competition in the women's slopestyle.

Sport	Event	Gold medalist(s)			Silver medalist(s)		Bronze medalist(s)		Ref
Sport	Event	Competitor(s)	Team	Rec	Competitor(s)	Team	Competitor(s)	Team	Ref
Biathlon	Mixed relay	Marte Olsbu Røiseland; Tiril Eckhoff; Tarjei Bø; Johannes Thingnes Bø	Norway		Anaïs Chevalier-Bouchet; Julia Simon; Émilien Jacquelin; Quentin Fillon Maillet	France	Uliana Nigmatullina; Kristina Reztsova; Alexander Loginov; Eduard Latypov	ROC	
Cross-country skiing	Women's skiathlon	Therese Johaug	Norway		Natalya Nepryayeva	ROC	Teresa Stadlober	Austria	
Freestyle skiing	Men's moguls	Walter Wallberg	Sweden		Mikaël Kingsbury	Canada	Ikuma Horishima	Japan	
Short track speed skating	Mixed relay	Qu Chunyu; Fan Kexin; Zhang Yuting; Wu Dajing; Ren Ziwei	China		Arianna Fontana; Arianna Valcepina; Martina Valcepina; Yuri Confortola; Pietro Sighel; Andrea Cassinelli	Italy	Petra Jászapáti; Zsófia Kónya; John-Henry Krueger; Shaoang Liu; Shaolin Sándor Liu	Hungary	
Ski jumping	Women's normal hill individual	Urša Bogataj	Slovenia		Katharina Althaus	Germany	Nika Križnar	Slovenia	
Speed skating	Women's 3000m	Irene Schouten	Netherlands	OR	Francesca Lollobrigida	Italy	Isabelle Weidemann	Canada	

=== Day 2 — Sunday 6 February ===
Alpine skiing

- The men's downhill is postponed to the following day due to high winds.

Curling

- Fifth day of the round-robin stage of the mixed doubles tournament.

Figure skating

- The second day of competition in the team event.

Ice hockey

- Fourth day of the group stage of the women's tournament.

Snowboarding

- The first day of competition in the men's slopestyle.

Sport	Event	Gold medalist(s)			Silver medalist(s)		Bronze medalist(s)		Ref
Sport	Event	Competitor(s)	Team	Rec	Competitor(s)	Team	Competitor(s)	Team	Ref
Cross-country skiing	Men's skiathlon	Alexander Bolshunov	ROC		Denis Spitsov	ROC	Iivo Niskanen	Finland	
Freestyle skiing	Women's moguls	Jakara Anthony	Australia		Jaelin Kauf	United States	Anastasia Smirnova	ROC	
Luge	Men's singles	Johannes Ludwig	Germany		Wolfgang Kindl	Austria	Dominik Fischnaller	Italy	
Ski jumping	Men's normal hill individual	Ryōyū Kobayashi	Japan		Manuel Fettner	Austria	Dawid Kubacki	Poland	
Snowboarding	Women's slopestyle	Zoi Sadowski-Synnott	New Zealand		Julia Marino	United States	Tess Coady	Australia	
Speed skating	Men's 5000m	Nils van der Poel	Sweden	OR	Patrick Roest	Netherlands	Hallgeir Engebråten	Norway	

=== Day 3 — Monday 7 February ===
Curling

- Final day of the round-robin stage and Semifinals of the mixed doubles tournament.

Freestyle skiing

- The first day of competition in both the men's big air and the women's big air.

Ice hockey

- Fifth day of the group stage of the women's tournament.

Luge

- Heats 1 and 2 of the women's singles.

Short track speed skating

- After several skaters in the men's 1000m receive penalty or yellow card decisions, Korea and Hungary file protests against those specific decisions that were handed to Hwang Dae-heon and Shaolin Sándor Liu, respectively. Because Ren Ziwei and Li Wenlong of China finish with gold and silver, respectively, and no other skater from the host country was penalized, other athletes accuse the officiating of bias. The International Skating Union (ISU) later rejects both protests, supporting the original decisions.

Sport	Event	Gold medalist(s)			Silver medalist(s)		Bronze medalist(s)		Ref
Sport	Event	Competitor(s)	Team	Rec	Competitor(s)	Team	Competitor(s)	Team	Ref
Alpine skiing	Men's downhill	Beat Feuz	Switzerland		Johan Clarey	France	Matthias Mayer	Austria	
Alpine skiing	Women's giant slalom	Sara Hector	Sweden		Federica Brignone	Italy	Lara Gut-Behrami	Switzerland	
Biathlon	Women's individual	Denise Herrmann	Germany		Anaïs Chevalier-Bouchet	France	Marte Olsbu Røiseland	Norway	
Figure skating	Team event	Nathan Chen; Vincent Zhou; Karen Chen; Alexa Knierim; Brandon Frazier; Madison Hubbell; Zachary Donohue; Madison Chock; Evan Bates	United States		Shoma Uno; Yuma Kagiyama; Wakaba Higuchi; Kaori Sakamoto; Riku Miura; Ryuichi Kihara; Misato Komatsubara; Tim Koleto	Japan	Mark Kondratiuk; ~~Kamila Valieva~~; Anastasia Mishina; Aleksandr Galliamov; Victoria Sinitsina; Nikita Katsalapov	ROC	
Short track speed skating	Men's 1000m	Ren Ziwei	China		Li Wenlong	China	Shaoang Liu	Hungary	
Short track speed skating	Women's 500m	Arianna Fontana	Italy		Suzanne Schulting	Netherlands	Kim Boutin	Canada	
Ski jumping	Mixed team	Nika Križnar; Timi Zajc; Urša Bogataj; Peter Prevc	Slovenia		Irma Makhinia; Danil Sadreev; Irina Avvakumova; Evgenii Klimov	ROC	Alexandria Loutitt; Matthew Soukup; Abigail Strate; Mackenzie Boyd-Clowes	Canada	
Snowboarding	Men's slopestyle	Max Parrot	Canada		Su Yiming	China	Mark McMorris	Canada	
Speed skating	Women's 1500m	Ireen Wüst	Netherlands	OR	Miho Takagi	Japan	Antoinette de Jong	Netherlands	

=== Day 4 — Tuesday 8 February ===
Figure skating

- Short program for the men's singles.

Ice hockey

- Final day of the group stage of the women's tournament.

Sport	Event	Gold medalist(s)			Silver medalist(s)		Bronze medalist(s)		Ref
Sport	Event	Competitor(s)	Team	Rec	Competitor(s)	Team	Competitor(s)	Team	Ref
Alpine skiing	Men's super-G	Matthias Mayer	Austria		Ryan Cochran-Siegle	United States	Aleksander Aamodt Kilde	Norway	
Biathlon	Men's individual	Quentin Fillon Maillet	France		Anton Smolski	Belarus	Johannes Thingnes Bø	Norway	
Cross-country skiing	Men's sprint	Johannes Høsflot Klæbo	Norway		Federico Pellegrino	Italy	Alexander Terentyev	ROC	
Cross-country skiing	Women's sprint	Jonna Sundling	Sweden		Maja Dahlqvist	Sweden	Jessie Diggins	United States	
Curling	Mixed doubles	Stefania Constantini; Amos Mosaner	Italy		Kristin Skaslien; Magnus Nedregotten	Norway	Almida de Val; Oskar Eriksson	Sweden	
Freestyle skiing	Women's big air	Eileen Gu	China		Tess Ledeux	France	Mathilde Gremaud	Switzerland	
Luge	Women's singles	Natalie Geisenberger	Germany		Anna Berreiter	Germany	Tatiana Ivanova	ROC	
Snowboarding	Men's parallel giant slalom	Benjamin Karl	Austria		Tim Mastnak	Slovenia	Vic Wild	ROC	
Snowboarding	Women's parallel giant slalom	Ester Ledecká	Czech Republic		Daniela Ulbing	Austria	Glorija Kotnik	Slovenia	
Speed skating	Men's 1500m	Kjeld Nuis	Netherlands	OR	Thomas Krol	Netherlands	Kim Min-seok	South Korea	

=== Day 5 — Wednesday 9 February ===
Curling

- The first matches in the round-robin stage of the men's tournament.

Ice hockey

- The first matches in the group stage of the men's tournament.

Snowboarding

- The first day of competition in both the women's halfpipe and the men's halfpipe.

Sport	Event	Gold medalist(s)			Silver medalist(s)		Bronze medalist(s)		Ref
Sport	Event	Competitor(s)	Team	Rec	Competitor(s)	Team	Competitor(s)	Team	Ref
Alpine skiing	Women's slalom	Petra Vlhová	Slovakia		Katharina Liensberger	Austria	Wendy Holdener	Switzerland	
Freestyle skiing	Men's big air	Birk Ruud	Norway		Colby Stevenson	United States	Henrik Harlaut	Sweden	
Luge	Doubles	Tobias Wendl; Tobias Arlt	Germany		Toni Eggert; Sascha Benecken	Germany	Thomas Steu; Lorenz Koller	Austria	
Nordic combined	Individual normal hill	Vinzenz Geiger	Germany		Jørgen Graabak	Norway	Lukas Greiderer	Austria	
Short track speed skating	Men's 1500m	Hwang Dae-heon	South Korea		Steven Dubois	Canada	Semion Elistratov	ROC	
Snowboarding	Women's snowboard cross	Lindsey Jacobellis	United States		Chloé Trespeuch	France	Meryeta O'Dine	Canada	

=== Day 6 — Thursday 10 February ===
Curling

- Second day of the round-robin stage of the men's tournament.
- The first matches in the round-robin stage of the women's tournament.

Ice hockey

- Second day of the group stage of the men's tournament.

Skeleton

- Runs 1 and 2 of the Men's.

Sport	Event	Gold medalist(s)			Silver medalist(s)		Bronze medalist(s)		Ref
Sport	Event	Competitor(s)	Team	Rec	Competitor(s)	Team	Competitor(s)	Team	Ref
Alpine skiing	Men's combined	Johannes Strolz	Austria		Aleksander Aamodt Kilde	Norway	James Crawford	Canada	
Cross-country skiing	Women's 10km classical	Therese Johaug	Norway		Kerttu Niskanen	Finland	Krista Pärmäkoski	Finland	
Figure skating	Men's singles	Nathan Chen	United States		Yuma Kagiyama	Japan	Shoma Uno	Japan	
Freestyle skiing	Mixed team aerials	Ashley Caldwell; Christopher Lillis; Justin Schoenefeld	United States		Xu Mengtao; Jia Zongyang; Qi Guangpu	China	Marion Thénault; Miha Fontaine; Lewis Irving	Canada	
Luge	Team relay	Natalie Geisenberger; Johannes Ludwig; Tobias Wendl; Tobias Arlt	Germany		Madeleine Egle; Wolfgang Kindl; Thomas Steu; Lorenz Koller	Austria	Elīza Tīruma; Kristers Aparjods; Mārtiņš Bots; Roberts Plūme	Latvia	
Snowboarding	Men's snowboard cross	Alessandro Hämmerle	Austria		Éliot Grondin	Canada	Omar Visintin	Italy	
Snowboarding	Women's halfpipe	Chloe Kim	United States		Queralt Castellet	Spain	Sena Tomita	Japan	
Speed skating	Women's 5000m	Irene Schouten	Netherlands	OR	Isabelle Weidemann	Canada	Martina Sáblíková	Czech Republic	

=== Day 7 — Friday 11 February ===
Curling

- Third day of the round-robin stage of the men's tournament.
- Second day of the round-robin stage of the women's tournament.

Ice hockey

- Third day of the group stage of the men's tournament.
- Quarterfinals of the women's tournament.

Skeleton

- Runs 1 and 2 of the Women's.

Sport	Event	Gold medalist(s)			Silver medalist(s)		Bronze medalist(s)		Ref
Sport	Event	Competitor(s)	Team	Rec	Competitor(s)	Team	Competitor(s)	Team	Ref
Alpine skiing	Women's super-G	Lara Gut-Behrami	Switzerland		Mirjam Puchner	Austria	Michelle Gisin	Switzerland	
Biathlon	Women's sprint	Marte Olsbu Røiseland	Norway		Elvira Öberg	Sweden	Dorothea Wierer	Italy	
Cross-country skiing	Men's 15km classical	Iivo Niskanen	Finland		Alexander Bolshunov	ROC	Johannes Høsflot Klæbo	Norway	
Short track speed skating	Women's 1000m	Suzanne Schulting	Netherlands		Choi Min-jeong	South Korea	Hanne Desmet	Belgium	
Skeleton	Men's	Christopher Grotheer	Germany		Axel Jungk	Germany	Yan Wengang	China	
Snowboarding	Men's halfpipe	Ayumu Hirano	Japan		Scotty James	Australia	Jan Scherrer	Switzerland	
Speed skating	Men's 10,000m	Nils van der Poel	Sweden	WR, OR	Patrick Roest	Netherlands	Davide Ghiotto	Italy	

=== Day 8 — Saturday 12 February ===
Curling

- Fourth day of the round-robin stage of the men's tournament.
- Third day of the round-robin stage of the women's tournament.

Figure skating

- Rhythm dance for the ice dance.

Ice hockey

- Fourth day of the group stage of the men's tournament.
- Quarterfinals of the women's tournament.

Sport	Event	Gold medalist(s)			Silver medalist(s)		Bronze medalist(s)		Ref
Sport	Event	Competitor(s)	Team	Rec	Competitor(s)	Team	Competitor(s)	Team	Ref
Biathlon	Men's sprint	Johannes Thingnes Bø	Norway		Quentin Fillon Maillet	France	Tarjei Bø	Norway	
Cross-country skiing	Women's 4×5km relay	Yuliya Stupak; Natalya Nepryayeva; Tatiana Sorina; Veronika Stepanova	ROC		Katherine Sauerbrey; Katharina Hennig; Victoria Carl; Sofie Krehl	Germany	Maja Dahlqvist; Ebba Andersson; Frida Karlsson; Jonna Sundling	Sweden	
Skeleton	Women's	Hannah Neise	Germany		Jaclyn Narracott	Australia	Kimberley Bos	Netherlands	
Ski jumping	Men's large hill individual	Marius Lindvik	Norway		Ryōyū Kobayashi	Japan	Karl Geiger	Germany	
Snowboarding	Mixed team snowboard cross	Nick Baumgartner; Lindsey Jacobellis	United States		Omar Visintin; Michela Moioli	Italy	Éliot Grondin; Meryeta O'Dine	Canada	
Speed skating	Men's 500m	Gao Tingyu	China	OR	Cha Min-kyu	South Korea	Wataru Morishige	Japan	

=== Day 9 — Sunday 13 February ===
Bobsleigh

- Heats 1 and 2 of the women's monobob.

Curling

- Fifth day of the round-robin stage of the men's tournament.
- Fourth day of the round-robin stage of the women's tournament.

Freestyle skiing

- The first day of competition in both the women's aerials and the women's slopestyle is postponed to the following day due to high winds and heavy snow.

Ice hockey

- Last day of the group stage of the Men's tournament.

Sport	Event	Gold medalist(s)			Silver medalist(s)		Bronze medalist(s)		Ref
Sport	Event	Competitor(s)	Team	Rec	Competitor(s)	Team	Competitor(s)	Team	Ref
Alpine skiing	Men's giant slalom	Marco Odermatt	Switzerland		Žan Kranjec	Slovenia	Mathieu Faivre	France	
Biathlon	Men's pursuit	Quentin Fillon Maillet	France		Tarjei Bø	Norway	Eduard Latypov	ROC	
Biathlon	Women's pursuit	Marte Olsbu Røiseland	Norway		Elvira Öberg	Sweden	Tiril Eckhoff	Norway	
Cross-country skiing	Men's 4×10km relay	Aleksey Chervotkin; Alexander Bolshunov; Denis Spitsov; Sergey Ustiugov	ROC		Emil Iversen; Pål Golberg; Hans Christer Holund; Johannes Høsflot Klæbo	Norway	Richard Jouve; Hugo Lapalus; Clément Parisse; Maurice Manificat	France	
Short track speed skating	Men's 500m	Shaoang Liu	Hungary		Konstantin Ivliev	ROC	Steven Dubois	Canada	
Short track speed skating	Women's 3000m relay	Suzanne Schulting; Selma Poutsma; Xandra Velzeboer; Yara van Kerkhof	Netherlands	OR	Seo Whi-min; Choi Min-jeong; Kim A-lang; Lee Yu-bin	South Korea	Qu Chunyu; Han Yutong; Fan Kexin; Zhang Yuting	China	
Speed skating	Women's 500m	Erin Jackson	United States		Miho Takagi	Japan	Angelina Golikova	ROC	

=== Day 10 — Monday 14 February ===
Bobsleigh

- Heats 1 and 2 of the Two-man.

Curling

- Sixth day of the round-robin stage of the men's tournament.
- Fifth day of the round-robin stage of the women's tournament.

Freestyle skiing

- The first day of competition of the women's aerials (rescheduled from the previous day). The originally scheduled final for this event is then held in the evening.
- The first day of competition of the women's slopestyle (rescheduled from the previous day). The originally scheduled final for this event is thus postponed to the next day.
- Due to the rescheduled women's slopestyle event, the first day of competition of the men's slopestyle is postponed to the following day.

Ice hockey

- Semifinals of the Women's tournament.

Snowboarding

- The first day of competition in both the women's big air and the men's big air.

Sport	Event	Gold medalist(s)			Silver medalist(s)		Bronze medalist(s)		Ref
Sport	Event	Competitor(s)	Team	Rec	Competitor(s)	Team	Competitor(s)	Team	Ref
Bobsleigh	Women's monobob	Kaillie Humphries	United States		Elana Meyers Taylor	United States	Christine de Bruin	Canada	
Figure skating	Ice dance	Gabriella Papadakis; Guillaume Cizeron	France		Victoria Sinitsina; Nikita Katsalapov	ROC	Madison Hubbell; Zachary Donohue	United States	
Freestyle skiing	Women's aerials	Xu Mengtao	China		Hanna Huskova	Belarus	Megan Nick	United States	
Ski jumping	Men's large hill team	Stefan Kraft; Daniel Huber; Jan Hörl; Manuel Fettner	Austria		Lovro Kos; Cene Prevc; Timi Zajc; Peter Prevc	Slovenia	Constantin Schmid; Stephan Leyhe; Markus Eisenbichler; Karl Geiger	Germany	

=== Day 11 — Tuesday 15 February ===
Curling

- Seventh day of the round-robin stage of the men's tournament.
- Sixth day of the round-robin stage of the women's tournament.

Figure skating

- Short program for the women's singles.

Freestyle skiing

- The first day of competition of the men's aerials.
- The first day of competition of the men's slopestyle (rescheduled from the previous day). The originally scheduled final for this event is thus postponed to the next day.

Ice hockey

- Playoff round of the Men's tournament.

Sport	Event	Gold medalist(s)			Silver medalist(s)		Bronze medalist(s)		Ref
Sport	Event	Competitor(s)	Team	Rec	Competitor(s)	Team	Competitor(s)	Team	Ref
Alpine skiing	Women's downhill	Corinne Suter	Switzerland		Sofia Goggia	Italy	Nadia Delago	Italy	
Biathlon	Men's relay	Sturla Holm Lægreid; Tarjei Bø; Johannes Thingnes Bø; Vetle Sjåstad Christiansen	Norway		Fabien Claude; Émilien Jacquelin; Simon Desthieux; Quentin Fillon Maillet	France	Said Karimulla Khalili; Alexander Loginov; Maxim Tsvetkov; Eduard Latypov	ROC	
Bobsleigh	Two-man	Francesco Friedrich; Thorsten Margis	Germany		Johannes Lochner; Florian Bauer	Germany	Christoph Hafer; Matthias Sommer	Germany	
Freestyle skiing	Women's slopestyle	Mathilde Gremaud	Switzerland		Eileen Gu	China	Kelly Sildaru	Estonia	
Nordic combined	Individual large hill	Jørgen Graabak	Norway		Jens Lurås Oftebro	Norway	Akito Watabe	Japan	
Snowboarding	Men's big air	Su Yiming	China		Mons Røisland	Norway	Max Parrot	Canada	
Snowboarding	Women's big air	Anna Gasser	Austria		Zoi Sadowski-Synnott	New Zealand	Kokomo Murase	Japan	
Speed skating	Men's team pursuit	Hallgeir Engebråten; Peder Kongshaug; Sverre Lunde Pedersen	Norway		Daniil Aldoshkin; Sergey Trofimov; Ruslan Zakharov	ROC	Ethan Cepuran; Casey Dawson; Emery Lehman	United States	
Speed skating	Women's team pursuit	Ivanie Blondin; Valérie Maltais; Isabelle Weidemann	Canada	OR	Ayano Sato; Miho Takagi; Nana Takagi	Japan	Marijke Groenewoud; Irene Schouten; Ireen Wüst	Netherlands	

=== Day 12 — Wednesday 16 February ===
Curling

- Eighth day of the round-robin stage of the men's tournament.
- Seventh day of the round-robin stage of the women's tournament.

Ice hockey

- Quarterfinals of the men's tournament.
- Bronze medal game of the Women's tournament.

Sport	Event	Gold medalist(s)			Silver medalist(s)		Bronze medalist(s)		Ref
Sport	Event	Competitor(s)	Team	Rec	Competitor(s)	Team	Competitor(s)	Team	Ref
Alpine skiing	Men's slalom	Clément Noël	France		Johannes Strolz	Austria	Sebastian Foss-Solevåg	Norway	
Biathlon	Women's relay	Linn Persson; Mona Brorsson; Hanna Öberg; Elvira Öberg	Sweden		Irina Kazakevich; Kristina Reztsova; Svetlana Mironova; Uliana Nigmatullina	ROC	Vanessa Voigt; Vanessa Hinz; Franziska Preuß; Denise Herrmann	Germany	
Cross-country skiing	Men's team sprint	Erik Valnes; Johannes Høsflot Klæbo	Norway		Iivo Niskanen; Joni Mäki	Finland	Alexander Bolshunov; Alexander Terentyev	ROC	
Cross-country skiing	Women's team sprint	Katharina Hennig; Victoria Carl	Germany		Maja Dahlqvist; Jonna Sundling	Sweden	Yuliya Stupak; Natalya Nepryayeva	ROC	
Freestyle skiing	Men's aerials	Qi Guangpu	China		Oleksandr Abramenko	Ukraine	Ilya Burov	ROC	
Freestyle skiing	Men's slopestyle	Alex Hall	United States		Nick Goepper	United States	Jesper Tjäder	Sweden	
Short track speed skating	Men's 5000m relay	Charles Hamelin; Steven Dubois; Jordan Pierre-Gilles; Pascal Dion	Canada		Lee June-seo; Hwang Dae-heon; Kwak Yoon-gy; Park Jang-hyuk	South Korea	Pietro Sighel; Yuri Confortola; Tommaso Dotti; Andrea Cassinelli	Italy	
Short track speed skating	Women's 1500m	Choi Min-jeong	South Korea		Arianna Fontana	Italy	Suzanne Schulting	Netherlands	

=== Day 13 — Thursday 17 February ===
Curling

- Last day of the round-robin stage and Semifinals of the men's tournament.
- Last day of the round-robin stage of the women's tournament.

Freestyle skiing

- The first day of competition for both the women's halfpipe and the men's halfpipe.

Sport	Event	Gold medalist(s)			Silver medalist(s)		Bronze medalist(s)		Ref
Sport	Event	Competitor(s)	Team	Rec	Competitor(s)	Team	Competitor(s)	Team	Ref
Alpine skiing	Women's combined	Michelle Gisin	Switzerland		Wendy Holdener	Switzerland	Federica Brignone	Italy	
Figure skating	Women's singles	Anna Shcherbakova	ROC		Alexandra Trusova	ROC	Kaori Sakamoto	Japan	
Freestyle skiing	Women's ski cross	Sandra Näslund	Sweden		Marielle Thompson	Canada	Daniela Maier	Germany	
Ice hockey	Women's (Note: bronze medalist(s) determined on the previous day.)	Canada women's team	Canada		United States women's team	United States	Finland women's team	Finland	
Nordic combined	Team	Espen Bjørnstad; Espen Andersen; Jens Lurås Oftebro; Jørgen Graabak	Norway		Manuel Faißt; Julian Schmid; Eric Frenzel; Vinzenz Geiger	Germany	Yoshito Watabe; Hideaki Nagai; Akito Watabe; Ryota Yamamoto	Japan	
Speed skating	Women's 1000m	Miho Takagi	Japan	OR	Jutta Leerdam	Netherlands	Brittany Bowe	United States	

=== Day 14 — Friday 18 February ===
Bobsleigh

- Heats 1 and 2 of the Two-woman.

Curling

- Bronze medal game of the Men's tournament.
- Semifinals of the Women's tournament.

Figure skating

- Short program for the pair skating.

Ice hockey

- Semifinals of the Men's tournament.

Sport	Event	Gold medalist(s)			Silver medalist(s)		Bronze medalist(s)		Ref
Sport	Event	Competitor(s)	Team	Rec	Competitor(s)	Team	Competitor(s)	Team	Ref
Biathlon	Men's mass start	Johannes Thingnes Bø	Norway		Martin Ponsiluoma	Sweden	Vetle Sjåstad Christiansen	Norway	
Biathlon	Women's mass start	Justine Braisaz-Bouchet	France		Tiril Eckhoff	Norway	Marte Olsbu Røiseland	Norway	
Freestyle skiing	Men's ski cross	Ryan Regez	Switzerland		Alex Fiva	Switzerland	Sergey Ridzik	ROC	
Freestyle skiing	Women's halfpipe	Eileen Gu	China		Cassie Sharpe	Canada	Rachael Karker	Canada	
Speed skating	Men's 1000m	Thomas Krol	Netherlands		Laurent Dubreuil	Canada	Håvard Holmefjord Lorentzen	Norway	

=== Day 15 — Saturday 19 February ===
Alpine skiing

- The mixed team event is postponed to the following day due to high winds.

Bobsleigh

- Heats 1 and 2 of the Four-man.

Cross-country skiing

- Due to high winds, the men's 50km freestyle is delayed by an hour and shortened to 30 km.

Curling

- Bronze medal game of the Women's tournament.

Ice hockey

- Bronze medal game of the Men's tournament.

Sport	Event	Gold medalist(s)			Silver medalist(s)		Bronze medalist(s)		Ref
Sport	Event	Competitor(s)	Team	Rec	Competitor(s)	Team	Competitor(s)	Team	Ref
Bobsleigh	Two-woman	Laura Nolte; Deborah Levi	Germany		Mariama Jamanka; Alexandra Burghardt	Germany	Elana Meyers Taylor; Sylvia Hoffman	United States	
Cross-country skiing	Men's 50km freestyle	Alexander Bolshunov	ROC		Ivan Yakimushkin	ROC	Simen Hegstad Krüger	Norway	
Curling	Men's	Niklas Edin; Oskar Eriksson; Rasmus Wranå; Christoffer Sundgren; Daniel Magnusson	Sweden		Bruce Mouat; Grant Hardie; Bobby Lammie; Hammy McMillan Jr. Ross Whyte	Great Britain	Brad Gushue; Mark Nichols; Brett Gallant; Geoff Walker; Marc Kennedy	Canada	
Figure skating	Pair skating	Sui Wenjing; Han Cong	China		Evgenia Tarasova; Vladimir Morozov	ROC	Anastasia Mishina; Aleksandr Galliamov	ROC	
Freestyle skiing	Men's halfpipe	Nico Porteous	New Zealand		David Wise	United States	Alex Ferreira	United States	
Speed skating	Men's mass start	Bart Swings	Belgium		Chung Jae-won	South Korea	Lee Seung-hoon	South Korea	
Speed skating	Women's mass start	Irene Schouten	Netherlands		Ivanie Blondin	Canada	Francesca Lollobrigida	Italy	

=== Day 16 — Sunday 20 February ===
Closing ceremony

- The closing ceremony was held at Beijing National Stadium.

Sport	Event	Gold medalist(s)			Silver medalist(s)		Bronze medalist(s)		Ref
Sport	Event	Competitor(s)	Team	Rec	Competitor(s)	Team	Competitor(s)	Team	Ref
Alpine skiing	Mixed team	Katharina Huber; Katharina Liensberger; Katharina Truppe; Stefan Brennsteiner; Michael Matt; Johannes Strolz	Austria		Emma Aicher; Lena Dürr; Julian Rauchfuß; Alexander Schmid; Linus Straßer	Germany	Mina Fürst Holtmann; Thea Louise Stjernesund; Maria Therese Tviberg; Timon Haugan; Fabian Wilkens Solheim; Rasmus Windingstad	Norway	
Bobsleigh	Four-man	Francesco Friedrich; Thorsten Margis; Candy Bauer; Alexander Schüller	Germany		Johannes Lochner; Florian Bauer; Christopher Weber; Christian Rasp	Germany	Justin Kripps; Ryan Sommer; Cam Stones; Ben Coakwell	Canada	
Cross-country skiing	Women's 30km freestyle	Therese Johaug	Norway		Jessie Diggins	United States	Kerttu Niskanen	Finland	
Curling	Women's	Eve Muirhead; Vicky Wright; Jennifer Dodds; Hailey Duff; Mili Smith	Great Britain		Satsuki Fujisawa; Chinami Yoshida; Yumi Suzuki; Yurika Yoshida; Kotomi Ishizaki	Japan	Anna Hasselborg; Sara McManus; Agnes Knochenhauer; Sofia Mabergs; Johanna Heldin	Sweden	
Ice hockey	Men's	Finland men's team	Finland		ROC men's team	ROC	Slovakia men's team	Slovakia	
