= List of 2022 Winter Olympics medal winners =

The 2022 Winter Olympics was held in Beijing, China, between 4–20 February 2022. The Games officially opened on 4 February with preliminary events beginning on 2 February.

== Alpine skiing ==
=== Men's events ===
Event	Gold	Silver	Bronze
Downhill	Beat Feuz; Switzerland	Johan Clarey; France	Matthias Mayer; Austria
Super-G	Matthias Mayer; Austria	Ryan Cochran-Siegle; United States	Aleksander Aamodt Kilde; Norway
Giant slalom	Marco Odermatt; Switzerland	Žan Kranjec; Slovenia	Mathieu Faivre; France
Slalom	Clément Noël; France	Johannes Strolz; Austria	Sebastian Foss-Solevåg; Norway
Combined	Johannes Strolz; Austria	Aleksander Aamodt Kilde; Norway	James Crawford; Canada

=== Women's events ===
Event	Gold	Silver	Bronze
Downhill	Corinne Suter; Switzerland	Sofia Goggia; Italy	Nadia Delago; Italy
Super-G	Lara Gut-Behrami; Switzerland	Mirjam Puchner; Austria	Michelle Gisin; Switzerland
Giant slalom	Sara Hector; Sweden	Federica Brignone; Italy	Lara Gut-Behrami; Switzerland
Slalom	Petra Vlhová; Slovakia	Katharina Liensberger; Austria	Wendy Holdener; Switzerland
Combined	Michelle Gisin; Switzerland	Wendy Holdener; Switzerland	Federica Brignone; Italy

=== Team event ===
Event	Gold	Silver	Bronze
Mixed team	Austria; Katharina Huber; Katharina Liensberger; Katharina Truppe; Stefan Brennsteiner; Michael Matt; Johannes Strolz	Germany; Emma Aicher; Lena Dürr; Julian Rauchfuß; Alexander Schmid; Linus Straßer	Norway; Mina Fürst Holtmann; Thea Louise Stjernesund; Maria Therese Tviberg; Timon Haugan; Fabian Wilkens Solheim; Rasmus Windingstad

== Biathlon ==
=== Men's events ===
Event	Gold	Silver	Bronze
Individual	Quentin Fillon Maillet; France	Anton Smolski; Belarus	Johannes Thingnes Bø; Norway
Sprint	Johannes Thingnes Bø; Norway	Quentin Fillon Maillet; France	Tarjei Bø; Norway
Pursuit	Quentin Fillon Maillet; France	Tarjei Bø; Norway	Eduard Latypov; ROC
Mass start	Johannes Thingnes Bø; Norway	Martin Ponsiluoma; Sweden	Vetle Sjåstad Christiansen; Norway
Relay	Norway; Sturla Holm Lægreid; Tarjei Bø; Johannes Thingnes Bø; Vetle Sjåstad Christiansen	France; Fabien Claude; Émilien Jacquelin; Simon Desthieux; Quentin Fillon Maillet	ROC; Said Karimulla Khalili; Alexander Loginov; Maxim Tsvetkov; Eduard Latypov

=== Women's events ===
Event	Gold	Silver	Bronze
Individual	Denise Herrmann; Germany	Anaïs Chevalier-Bouchet; France	Marte Olsbu Røiseland; Norway
Sprint	Marte Olsbu Røiseland; Norway	Elvira Öberg; Sweden	Dorothea Wierer; Italy
Pursuit	Marte Olsbu Røiseland; Norway	Elvira Öberg; Sweden	Tiril Eckhoff; Norway
Mass start	Justine Braisaz-Bouchet; France	Tiril Eckhoff; Norway	Marte Olsbu Røiseland; Norway
Relay	Sweden; Linn Persson; Mona Brorsson; Hanna Öberg; Elvira Öberg	ROC; Irina Kazakevich; Kristina Reztsova; Svetlana Mironova; Uliana Nigmatullina	Germany; Vanessa Voigt; Vanessa Hinz; Franziska Preuß; Denise Herrmann

=== Mixed event ===
Event	Gold	Silver	Bronze
Relay	Norway; Marte Olsbu Røiseland; Tiril Eckhoff; Tarjei Bø; Johannes Thingnes Bø	France; Anaïs Chevalier-Bouchet; Julia Simon; Émilien Jacquelin; Quentin Fillon Maillet	ROC; Uliana Nigmatullina; Kristina Reztsova; Alexander Loginov; Eduard Latypov

== Bobsleigh ==
Event	Gold	Silver	Bronze
Two-man	Germany; Francesco Friedrich; Thorsten Margis	Germany; Johannes Lochner; Florian Bauer	Germany; Christoph Hafer; Matthias Sommer
Four-man	Germany; Francesco Friedrich; Thorsten Margis; Candy Bauer; Alexander Schüller	Germany; Johannes Lochner; Florian Bauer; Christopher Weber; Christian Rasp	Canada; Justin Kripps; Ryan Sommer; Cam Stones; Ben Coakwell
Women's monobob	Kaillie Humphries; United States	Elana Meyers Taylor; United States	Christine de Bruin; Canada
Two-woman	Germany; Laura Nolte; Deborah Levi	Germany; Mariama Jamanka; Alexandra Burghardt	United States; Elana Meyers Taylor; Sylvia Hoffman

== Cross-country skiing ==
=== Men's events ===
Games	Gold	Silver	Bronze
15 kilometre classical	Iivo Niskanen; Finland	Alexander Bolshunov; ROC	Johannes Høsflot Klæbo; Norway
30 kilometre skiathlon	Alexander Bolshunov; ROC	Denis Spitsov; ROC	Iivo Niskanen; Finland
50 kilometre freestyle	Alexander Bolshunov; ROC	Ivan Yakimushkin; ROC	Simen Hegstad Krüger; Norway
4 × 10 kilometre relay	ROC; Aleksey Chervotkin; Alexander Bolshunov; Denis Spitsov; Sergey Ustiugov	Norway; Emil Iversen; Pål Golberg; Hans Christer Holund; Johannes Høsflot Klæbo	France; Richard Jouve; Hugo Lapalus; Clément Parisse; Maurice Manificat
Sprint freestyle	Johannes Høsflot Klæbo; Norway	Federico Pellegrino; Italy	Alexander Terentyev; ROC
Team sprint classical	Norway; Erik Valnes; Johannes Høsflot Klæbo	Finland; Iivo Niskanen; Joni Mäki	ROC; Alexander Bolshunov; Alexander Terentyev

=== Women's events ===
Games	Gold	Silver	Bronze
10 kilometre classical	Therese Johaug; Norway	Kerttu Niskanen; Finland	Krista Pärmäkoski; Finland
15 kilometre skiathlon	Therese Johaug; Norway	Natalya Nepryayeva; ROC	Teresa Stadlober; Austria
30 kilometre freestyle	Therese Johaug; Norway	Jessie Diggins; United States	Kerttu Niskanen; Finland
4 × 5 kilometre relay	ROC; Yuliya Stupak; Natalya Nepryayeva; Tatiana Sorina; Veronika Stepanova	Germany; Katherine Sauerbrey; Katharina Hennig; Victoria Carl; Sofie Krehl	Sweden; Maja Dahlqvist; Ebba Andersson; Frida Karlsson; Jonna Sundling
Sprint freestyle	Jonna Sundling; Sweden	Maja Dahlqvist; Sweden	Jessie Diggins; United States
Team sprint classical	Germany; Katharina Hennig; Victoria Carl	Sweden; Maja Dahlqvist; Jonna Sundling	ROC; Yuliya Stupak; Natalya Nepryayeva

== Curling ==
Event	Gold	Silver	Bronze
Men	Sweden; Niklas Edin; Oskar Eriksson; Rasmus Wranå; Christoffer Sundgren; Daniel Magnusson	Great Britain; Bruce Mouat; Grant Hardie; Bobby Lammie; Hammy McMillan Jr. Ross Whyte	Canada; Brad Gushue; Mark Nichols; Brett Gallant; Geoff Walker; Marc Kennedy
Women	Great Britain; Eve Muirhead; Vicky Wright; Jennifer Dodds; Hailey Duff; Mili Smith	Japan; Satsuki Fujisawa; Chinami Yoshida; Yumi Suzuki; Yurika Yoshida; Kotomi Ishizaki	Sweden; Anna Hasselborg; Sara McManus; Agnes Knochenhauer; Sofia Mabergs; Johanna Heldin
Mixed doubles	Italy; Stefania Constantini; Amos Mosaner	Norway; Kristin Skaslien; Magnus Nedregotten	Sweden; Almida de Val; Oskar Eriksson

== Figure skating ==
Event	Gold	Silver	Bronze
Men's singles	Nathan Chen; United States	Yuma Kagiyama; Japan	Shoma Uno; Japan
Women's singles	Anna Shcherbakova; ROC	Alexandra Trusova; ROC	Kaori Sakamoto; Japan
Pair skating	China; Sui Wenjing; Han Cong	ROC; Evgenia Tarasova; Vladimir Morozov	ROC; Anastasia Mishina; Aleksandr Galliamov
Ice dance	France; Gabriella Papadakis; Guillaume Cizeron	ROC; Victoria Sinitsina; Nikita Katsalapov	United States; Madison Hubbell; Zachary Donohue
Team event	United States; Nathan Chen*; Vincent Zhou**; Karen Chen; Alexa Knierim; Brandon Frazier; Madison Hubbell*; Zachary Donohue*; Madison Chock**; Evan Bates**	Japan; Shoma Uno*; Yuma Kagiyama**; Wakaba Higuchi*; Kaori Sakamoto**; Riku Miura; Ryuichi Kihara; Misato Komatsubara; Tim Koleto	ROC; Mark Kondratiuk; Anastasia Mishina; Aleksandr Galliamov; Victoria Sinitsina; Nikita Katsalapov

^{*} Skaters who only competed in the short program/rhythm dance.
^{**} Skaters who only competed in the free skating/dance.

== Freestyle skiing ==
=== Men's events ===
Games	Gold	Silver	Bronze
Aerials	Qi Guangpu; China	Oleksandr Abramenko; Ukraine	Ilya Burov; ROC
Big air	Birk Ruud; Norway	Colby Stevenson; United States	Henrik Harlaut; Sweden
Halfpipe	Nico Porteous; New Zealand	David Wise; United States	Alex Ferreira; United States
Slopestyle	Alex Hall; United States	Nick Goepper; United States	Jesper Tjäder; Sweden
Moguls	Walter Wallberg; Sweden	Mikaël Kingsbury; Canada	Ikuma Horishima; Japan
Ski cross	Ryan Regez; Switzerland	Alex Fiva; Switzerland	Sergey Ridzik; ROC

=== Women's events ===
Games	Gold	Silver	Bronze
Aerials	Xu Mengtao; China	Hanna Huskova; Belarus	Megan Nick; United States
Big air	Eileen Gu; China	Tess Ledeux; France	Mathilde Gremaud; Switzerland
Halfpipe	Eileen Gu; China	Cassie Sharpe; Canada	Rachael Karker; Canada
Slopestyle	Mathilde Gremaud; Switzerland	Eileen Gu; China	Kelly Sildaru; Estonia
Moguls	Jakara Anthony; Australia	Jaelin Kauf; United States	Anastasia Smirnova; ROC
Ski cross	Sandra Näslund; Sweden	Marielle Thompson; Canada	Daniela Maier; Germany
Ski cross	Sandra Näslund; Sweden	Marielle Thompson; Canada	Fanny Smith; Switzerland

=== Mixed team event ===
Games	Gold	Silver	Bronze
Aerials	United States; Ashley Caldwell; Christopher Lillis; Justin Schoenefeld	China; Xu Mengtao; Jia Zongyang; Qi Guangpu	Canada; Marion Thénault; Miha Fontaine; Lewis Irving

== Ice hockey ==
Games	Gold	Silver	Bronze
Men's tournament	Finland; Ville Pokka; Niklas Friman; Mikko Lehtonen; Marko Anttila; Valtteri Kemiläinen; Miro Aaltonen; Niko Ojamäki; Hannes Björninen; Toni Rajala; Joonas Nättinen; Harri Säteri; Frans Tuohimaa; Juuso Hietanen; Petteri Lindbohm; Sami Vatanen; Juho Olkinuora; Valtteri Filppula; Atte Ohtamaa; Markus Granlund; Sakari Manninen; Teemu Hartikainen; Leo Komarov; Saku Mäenalanen; Iiro Pakarinen; Harri Pesonen	ROC; Sergei Andronov; Timur Bilyalov; Andrei Chibisov; Ivan Fedotov; Stanislav Galiev; Mikhail Grigorenko; Arseni Gritsyuk; Nikita Gusev; Pavel Karnaukhov; Artur Kayumov; Artyom Minulin; Nikita Nesterov; Alexander Nikishin; Sergei Plotnikov; Alexander Samonov; Kirill Semyonov; Damir Sharipzyanov; Vadim Shipachyov; Anton Slepyshev; Sergei Telegin; Vladimir Tkachyov; Dmitri Voronkov; Slava Voynov; Egor Yakovlev; Alexander Yelesin	Slovakia; Branislav Konrád; Patrik Rybár; Matej Tomek; Michal Čajkovský; Peter Čerešňák; Marek Ďaloga; Martin Gernát; Mario Grman; Samuel Kňažko; Martin Marinčin; Šimon Nemec; Peter Cehlárik; Marko Daňo; Adrián Holešinský; Marek Hrivík; Libor Hudáček; Tomáš Jurčo; Miloš Kelemen; Michal Krištof; Kristián Pospíšil; Pavol Regenda; Miloš Roman; Juraj Slafkovský; Samuel Takáč; Peter Zuzin
Women's tournament	Canada; Erin Ambrose; Ashton Bell; Kristen Campbell; Emily Clark; Mélodie Daoust; Ann-Renée Desbiens; Renata Fast; Sarah Fillier; Brianne Jenner; Rebecca Johnston; Jocelyne Larocque; Emma Maltais; Emerance Maschmeyer; Sarah Nurse; Marie-Philip Poulin; Jamie Lee Rattray; Jill Saulnier; Ella Shelton; Natalie Spooner; Laura Stacey; Claire Thompson; Blayre Turnbull; Micah Zandee-Hart	United States; Cayla Barnes; Megan Bozek; Hannah Brandt; Dani Cameranesi; Alexandra Carpenter; Alex Cavallini; Jesse Compher; Kendall Coyne Schofield; Brianna Decker; Jincy Roese; Savannah Harmon; Caroline Harvey; Nicole Hensley; Megan Keller; Amanda Kessel; Hilary Knight; Abbey Murphy; Kelly Pannek; Maddie Rooney; Abby Roque; Hayley Scamurra; Lee Stecklein; Grace Zumwinkle	Finland; Sanni Hakala; Jenni Hiirikoski; Elisa Holopainen; Sini Karjalainen; Michelle Karvinen; Anni Keisala; Nelli Laitinen; Julia Liikala; Eveliina Mäkinen; Petra Nieminen; Tanja Niskanen; Jenniina Nylund; Meeri Räisänen; Sanni Rantala; Ronja Savolainen; Sofianna Sundelin; Susanna Tapani; Noora Tulus; Minttu Tuominen; Viivi Vainikka; Sanni Vanhanen; Emilia Vesa; Ella Viitasuo

== Luge ==
Event	Gold	Silver	Bronze
Men's singles	Johannes Ludwig; Germany	Wolfgang Kindl; Austria	Dominik Fischnaller; Italy
Open doubles	Germany; Tobias Wendl; Tobias Arlt	Germany; Toni Eggert; Sascha Benecken	Austria; Thomas Steu; Lorenz Koller
Women's singles	Natalie Geisenberger; Germany	Anna Berreiter; Germany	Tatiana Ivanova; ROC
Team relay	Germany; Natalie Geisenberger; Johannes Ludwig; Tobias Wendl; Tobias Arlt	Austria; Madeleine Egle; Wolfgang Kindl; Thomas Steu; Lorenz Koller	Latvia; Elīza Tīruma; Kristers Aparjods; Mārtiņš Bots; Roberts Plūme

== Nordic combined ==
Games	Gold	Silver	Bronze
Individual large hill / 10 km	Jørgen Graabak; Norway	Jens Lurås Oftebro; Norway	Akito Watabe; Japan
Individual normal hill / 10 km	Vinzenz Geiger; Germany	Jørgen Graabak; Norway	Lukas Greiderer; Austria
Team large hill / 4 x 5 km	Norway; Espen Bjørnstad; Espen Andersen; Jens Lurås Oftebro; Jørgen Graabak	Germany; Manuel Faißt; Julian Schmid; Eric Frenzel; Vinzenz Geiger	Japan; Yoshito Watabe; Hideaki Nagai; Akito Watabe; Ryota Yamamoto

== Short track speed skating ==
=== Men's events ===
Games	Gold	Silver	Bronze
500 metres	Shaoang Liu; Hungary	Konstantin Ivliev; ROC	Steven Dubois; Canada
1000 metres	Ren Ziwei; China	Li Wenlong; China	Shaoang Liu; Hungary
1500 metres	Hwang Dae-heon; South Korea	Steven Dubois; Canada	Semion Elistratov; ROC
5000 metre relay	Canada; Charles Hamelin; Steven Dubois; Jordan Pierre-Gilles; Pascal Dion	South Korea; Lee June-seo; Hwang Dae-heon; Kwak Yoon-gy; Park Jang-hyuk	Italy; Pietro Sighel; Yuri Confortola; Tommaso Dotti; Andrea Cassinelli

=== Women's events ===
Games	Gold	Silver	Bronze
500 metres	Arianna Fontana; Italy	Suzanne Schulting; Netherlands	Kim Boutin; Canada
1000 metres	Suzanne Schulting; Netherlands	Choi Min-jeong; South Korea	Hanne Desmet; Belgium
1500 metres	Choi Min-jeong; South Korea	Arianna Fontana; Italy	Suzanne Schulting; Netherlands
3000 metre relay	Netherlands; Suzanne Schulting; Selma Poutsma; Xandra Velzeboer; Yara van Kerkhof	South Korea; Seo Whi-min; Choi Min-jeong; Kim A-lang; Lee Yu-bin	China; Qu Chunyu; Han Yutong; Fan Kexin; Zhang Yuting

=== Mixed event ===
Games	Gold	Silver	Bronze
2000 metre relay	China; Qu Chunyu; Fan Kexin; Wu Dajing; Ren Ziwei; Zhang Yuting^{[a]}	Italy; Arianna Fontana; Martina Valcepina; Pietro Sighel; Andrea Cassinelli; Arianna Valcepina^{[a]} Yuri Confortola^{[a]}	Hungary; Petra Jászapáti; Zsófia Kónya; Shaoang Liu; Shaolin Sándor Liu; John-Henry Krueger^{[a]}

^{a} Skaters who did not participate in the final, but received medals.

== Skeleton ==
Games	Gold	Silver	Bronze
Men's	Christopher Grotheer; Germany	Axel Jungk; Germany	Yan Wengang; China
Women's	Hannah Neise; Germany	Jaclyn Narracott; Australia	Kimberley Bos; Netherlands

== Ski jumping ==
Games	Gold	Silver	Bronze
Men's normal hill individual	Ryōyū Kobayashi; Japan	Manuel Fettner; Austria	Dawid Kubacki; Poland
Men's large hill individual	Marius Lindvik; Norway	Ryōyū Kobayashi; Japan	Karl Geiger; Germany
Men's large hill team	Austria; Stefan Kraft; Daniel Huber; Jan Hörl; Manuel Fettner	Slovenia; Lovro Kos; Cene Prevc; Timi Zajc; Peter Prevc	Germany; Constantin Schmid; Stephan Leyhe; Markus Eisenbichler; Karl Geiger
Women's normal hill individual	Urša Bogataj; Slovenia	Katharina Althaus; Germany	Nika Križnar; Slovenia
Mixed normal hill team	Slovenia; Nika Križnar; Timi Zajc; Urša Bogataj; Peter Prevc	ROC; Irma Makhinia; Danil Sadreev; Irina Avvakumova; Evgenii Klimov	Canada; Alexandria Loutitt; Matthew Soukup; Abigail Strate; Mackenzie Boyd-Clowes

== Snowboarding ==
=== Men's events ===
Games	Gold	Silver	Bronze
Big air	Su Yiming; China	Mons Røisland; Norway	Max Parrot; Canada
Halfpipe	Ayumu Hirano; Japan	Scotty James; Australia	Jan Scherrer; Switzerland
Slopestyle	Max Parrot; Canada	Su Yiming; China	Mark McMorris; Canada
Parallel giant slalom	Benjamin Karl; Austria	Tim Mastnak; Slovenia	Vic Wild; ROC
Snowboard cross	Alessandro Hämmerle; Austria	Éliot Grondin; Canada	Omar Visintin; Italy

=== Women's events ===
Games	Gold	Silver	Bronze
Big air	Anna Gasser; Austria	Zoi Sadowski-Synnott; New Zealand	Kokomo Murase; Japan
Halfpipe	Chloe Kim; United States	Queralt Castellet; Spain	Sena Tomita; Japan
Slopestyle	Zoi Sadowski-Synnott; New Zealand	Julia Marino; United States	Tess Coady; Australia
Parallel giant slalom	Ester Ledecká; Czech Republic	Daniela Ulbing; Austria	Glorija Kotnik; Slovenia
Snowboard cross	Lindsey Jacobellis; United States	Chloé Trespeuch; France	Meryeta O'Dine; Canada

=== Mixed event ===
Games	Gold	Silver	Bronze
Team snowboard cross	United States; Nick Baumgartner; Lindsey Jacobellis	Italy; Omar Visintin; Michela Moioli	Canada; Éliot Grondin; Meryeta O'Dine

== Speed skating ==
=== Men's events ===
Games	Gold	Silver	Bronze
500 metres	Gao Tingyu; China	Cha Min-kyu; South Korea	Wataru Morishige; Japan
1000 metres	Thomas Krol; Netherlands	Laurent Dubreuil; Canada	Håvard Holmefjord Lorentzen; Norway
1500 metres	Kjeld Nuis; Netherlands	Thomas Krol; Netherlands	Kim Min-seok; South Korea
5000 metres	Nils van der Poel; Sweden	Patrick Roest; Netherlands	Hallgeir Engebråten; Norway
10,000 metres	Nils van der Poel; Sweden	Patrick Roest; Netherlands	Davide Ghiotto; Italy
Mass start	Bart Swings; Belgium	Chung Jae-won; South Korea	Lee Seung-hoon; South Korea
Team pursuit	Norway; Hallgeir Engebråten; Peder Kongshaug; Sverre Lunde Pedersen	ROC; Daniil Aldoshkin; Sergey Trofimov; Ruslan Zakharov	United States; Ethan Cepuran; Casey Dawson; Emery Lehman

=== Women's events ===
Games	Gold	Silver	Bronze
500 metres	Erin Jackson; United States	Miho Takagi; Japan	Angelina Golikova; ROC
1000 metres	Miho Takagi; Japan	Jutta Leerdam; Netherlands	Brittany Bowe; United States
1500 metres	Ireen Wüst; Netherlands	Miho Takagi; Japan	Antoinette de Jong; Netherlands
3000 metres	Irene Schouten; Netherlands	Francesca Lollobrigida; Italy	Isabelle Weidemann; Canada
5000 metres	Irene Schouten; Netherlands	Isabelle Weidemann; Canada	Martina Sáblíková; Czech Republic
Mass start	Irene Schouten; Netherlands	Ivanie Blondin; Canada	Francesca Lollobrigida; Italy
Team pursuit	Canada; Ivanie Blondin; Valérie Maltais; Isabelle Weidemann	Japan; Ayano Sato; Miho Takagi; Nana Takagi	Netherlands; Marijke Groenewoud; Antoinette de Jong; Irene Schouten; Ireen Wüst

== Changes in medals ==
German skier Daniela Maier was initially awarded the bronze medal in the women's ski cross after Swiss skier Fanny Smith was penalised for a clash with Maier during the race. On 26 February 2022, the International Ski Federation rescinded the penalty, with Smith receiving the bronze medal, and Maier being downgraded to fourth place. On 13 December 2022, the Court of Arbitration for Sport changed the results, ruling that Maier and Smith would both receive bronze medals.

On 29 January 2024, the Court of Arbitration for Sport disqualified ROC figure skater Kamila Valieva for four years retroactive for an anti-doping violation. The team figure skating medals were re-allocated by the International Skating Union, with the United States and Japan being promoted to gold and silver, respectively, and ROC being downgraded to bronze. Both the Canadian Olympic Committee and Russia appealed the re-allocation of the medals, with Russia's appeals dismissed on 25 July 2024 and Canada's appeal dismissed on 1 August 2024.

== See also ==
- 2022 Winter Olympics medal table
