= Short-track speed skating at the 2022 Winter Olympics – Women's 500 metres =

Women's 500 metres at the XXIV Olympic Winter Games
- Short track speed skating
- Venue: Capital Indoor Stadium, Beijing
- Date: 5 and 7 February 2022
- Competitors: 32 from 15 nations
- Winning time: 42.488

Medalists
1st place, gold medalist(s)		Arianna Fontana	Italy
2nd place, silver medalist(s)		Suzanne Schulting	Netherlands
3rd place, bronze medalist(s)		Kim Boutin	Canada

The women's 500 metres competition in short track speed skating at the 2022 Winter Olympics was held on 5 February (heats) and 7 February (finals), at the Capital Indoor Stadium in Beijing. Arianna Fontana of Italy won the event, replicating her success in 2018. Suzanne Schulting of the Netherlands took the silver, setting the Olympic record in one of the heats, and Kim Boutin of Canada won the bronze.

The defending champion was Fontana. The silver medalist, Yara van Kerkhof, and the bronze medalist, Boutin, who was also the world record holder, qualified as well. Van Kerkhof, however, was not selected to skate this distance. Schulting was the 2021 World Short Track Speed Skating champion at all distances, including 1500 m. Fontana and Selma Poutsma were the silver and bronze medalists, respectively. Many top athletes did not participate in the championship, however. Fontana was leading the 2021–22 ISU Short Track Speed Skating World Cup at the 500 m distance with four races completed before the Olympics, followed by Boutin and Natalia Maliszewska. Maliszewska was not allowed to compete as she tested positive for COVID-19 shortly after her arrival in Beijing.

== Qualification ==
Countries were assigned quotas based on their performance during the 2021–22 ISU Short Track Speed Skating World Cup, with the top 32 athletes (maximum of three per country qualifying quotas. If a NOC declined a quota spot, it was distributed to the next available athlete, only if the maximum quota of 56 athletes per gender was not surpassed.

== Records ==
Prior to this competition, the existing world and Olympic records were as follows.

World record	Kim Boutin (CAN)	41.936	Salt Lake City, United States	3 November 2019
Olympic record	Choi Min-jeong (KOR)	42.422	Gangneung, South Korea	13 February 2018

A new Olympic record was set during the competition.

Date	Round	Athlete	Country	Time	Record	Ref
5 February	Heat 4	Suzanne Schulting	Netherlands	42.379	OR	

== Results ==
=== Heats ===
Rank	Heat	Name	Country	Time	Notes
1	1	Selma Poutsma	Netherlands	43.472	Q
2	1	Florence Brunelle	Canada	43.477	Q
3	1	Valentina Aščić	Croatia	44.681	
4	1	Tifany Huot-Marchand	France	54.758	
1	2	Fan Kexin	China	43.275	Q
2	2	Sofia Prosvirnova	ROC	43.331	Q
3	2	Zsófia Kónya	Hungary	43.905	
4	2	Gwendoline Daudet	France	45.515	
1	3	Kim Boutin	Canada	42.732	Q
2	3	Petra Jászapáti	Hungary	42.848	Q
3	3	Maame Biney	United States	42.919	q
4	3	Kamila Stormowska	Poland	44.053	
1	4	Suzanne Schulting	Netherlands	42.379	Q, OR
2	4	Alyson Charles	Canada	42.991	Q
3	4	Arianna Valcepina	Italy	43.070	q
4	4	Ekaterina Efremenkova	ROC	43.140	
1	5	Arianna Fontana	Italy	42.940	Q
2	5	Zhang Yuting	China	43.233	Q
3	5	Michaela Hrůzová	Czech Republic	45.060	
4	5	Corinne Stoddard	United States	No time	
1	6	Choi Min-jeong	South Korea	42.853	Q
2	6	Martina Valcepina	Italy	43.606	Q
3	6	Patrycja Maliszewska	Poland	44.130	
4	6	Kathryn Thomson	Great Britain	1:06.594	
1	7	Xandra Velzeboer	Netherlands	42.563	Q
2	7	Qu Chunyu	China	42.691	Q
3	7	Sumire Kikuchi	Japan	42.829	q
4	7	Lee Yu-bin	South Korea	43.141	
1	8	Kristen Santos	United States	43.579	Q
2	8	Elena Seregina	ROC	43.605	Q
3	8	Hanne Desmet	Belgium	43.702	q
4	8	Nikola Mazur	Poland	43.732	

=== Quarterfinals ===
Rank	Heat	Name	Country	Time	Notes
1	1	Kim Boutin	Canada	42.391	Q
2	1	Arianna Valcepina	Italy	42.891	Q
3	1	Fan Kexin	China	1:03.594	
4	1	Alyson Charles	Canada	1:07.206	ADV
	1	Florence Brunelle	Canada		PEN
1	2	Petra Jászapáti	Hungary	43.476	Q
2	2	Elena Seregina	ROC	43.712	Q
3	2	Maame Biney	United States	46.099	
4	2	Selma Poutsma	Netherlands	1:07.285	
	2	Xandra Velzeboer	Netherlands		PEN
1	3	Arianna Fontana	Italy	42.635	Q
2	3	Hanne Desmet	Belgium	42.991	Q
3	3	Zhang Yuting	China	54.211	ADV
4	3	Choi Min-jeong	South Korea	1:04.939	
	3	Sofia Prosvirnova	ROC		PEN
1	4	Suzanne Schulting	Netherlands	42.922	Q
2	4	Qu Chunyu	China	43.029	Q
3	4	Sumire Kikuchi	Japan	56.092	
	4	Kristen Santos	United States		PEN
	4	Martina Valcepina	Italy		PEN

=== Semifinals ===
Rank	Heat	Name	Country	Time	Notes
1	1	Arianna Fontana	Italy	42.387	QA
2	1	Kim Boutin	Canada	42.664	QA
3	1	Elena Seregina	ROC	42.685	QB
4	1	Alyson Charles	Canada	42.829	QB
5	1	Arianna Valcepina	Italy	44.044	
1	2	Suzanne Schulting	Netherlands	42.475	QA
2	2	Zhang Yuting	China	43.196	QA
3	2	Petra Jászapáti	Hungary	43.198	QB
4	2	Hanne Desmet	Belgium	55.304	ADVA
	2	Qu Chunyu	China		PEN

=== Finals ===
==== Final B ====
Rank	Name	Country	Time	Notes
6	Elena Seregina	ROC	42.972	
7	Petra Jászapáti	Hungary	43.004	
8	Alyson Charles	Canada	43.273	

==== Final A ====
Rank	Name	Country	Time	Notes
1st place, gold medalist(s)	Arianna Fontana	Italy	42.488	
2nd place, silver medalist(s)	Suzanne Schulting	Netherlands	42.559	
3rd place, bronze medalist(s)	Kim Boutin	Canada	42.724	
4	Zhang Yuting	China	42.803	
5	Hanne Desmet	Belgium	42.941	
