= Italy at the 2022 Winter Olympics =

- Flag of Italy
- IOC code: ITA
- NOC: Italian National Olympic Committee
- Website: www.coni.it/en

in Beijing, China 4–20 February 2022
- Competitors: 119 (72 men and 47 women) in 14 sports
- Flag bearer (opening): Michela Moioli
- Flag bearer (closing): Francesca Lollobrigida
- Medals Ranked 13th: Gold 2 Silver 7 Bronze 8 Total 17

Winter Olympics appearances (overview)
- 1924; 1928; 1932; 1936; 1948; 1952; 1956; 1960; 1964; 1968; 1972; 1976; 1980; 1984; 1988; 1992; 1994; 1998; 2002; 2006; 2010; 2014; 2018; 2022; 2026

Italy competed at the 2022 Winter Olympics in Beijing, China, from 4 to 20 February 2022. As Milan-Cortina d'Ampezzo will host the 2026 Winter Olympics, Italy was the penultimate nation to enter the stadium, before the host country China during the parade of nations at the opening ceremony. Additionally, an Italian segment was performed at the closing ceremony.

== Competitors ==
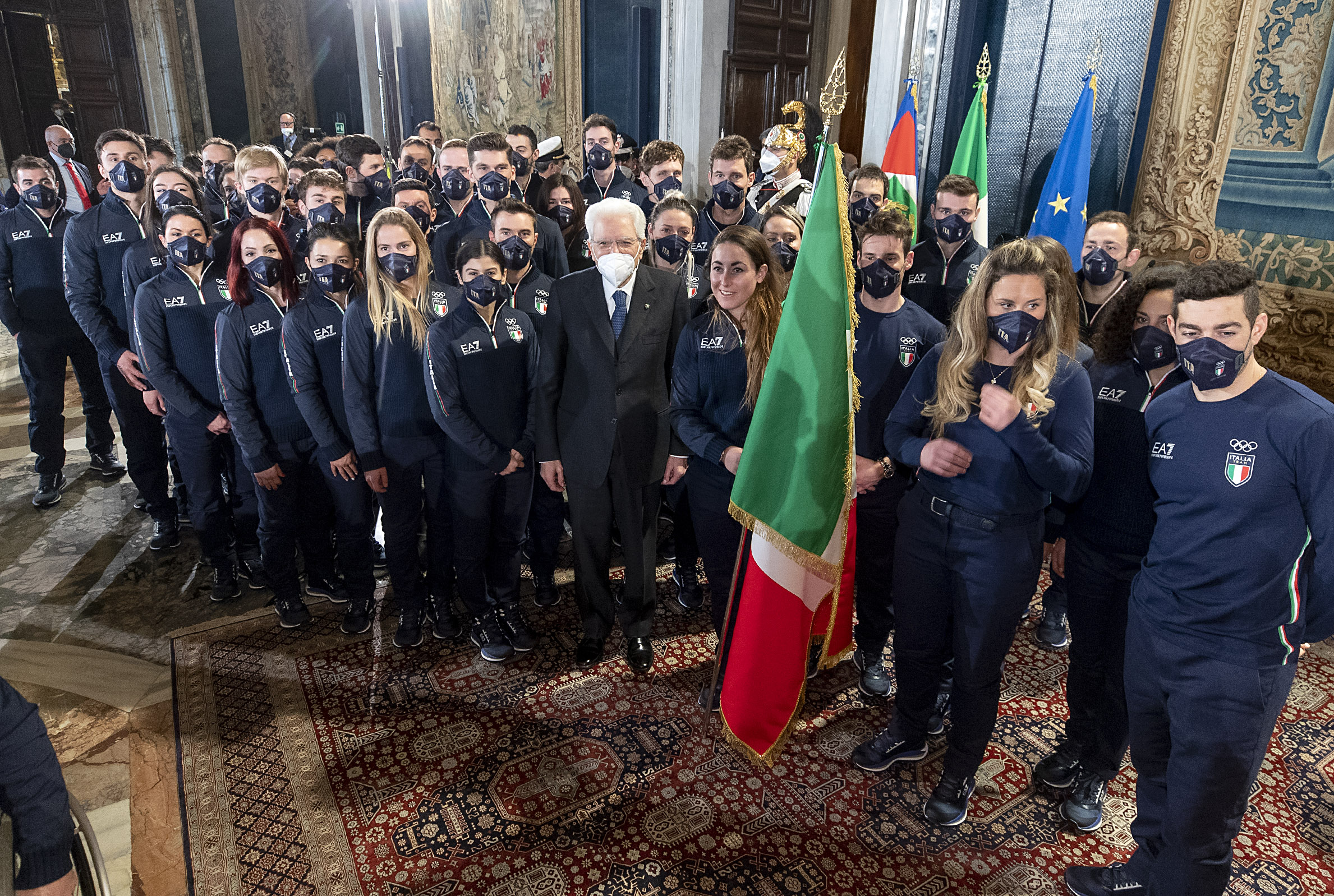
President of Italy Sergio Mattarella delivers the national flag to the Italian Olympic team departing for Beijing 2022.

The following is the list of number of competitors participating at the Games per sport.

Sport	Men	Women	Total
Alpine skiing	7	9	16
Biathlon	5	5	10
Bobsleigh	8	1	9
Cross-country skiing	6	6	12
Curling	5	1	6
Figure skating	5	4	9
Freestyle skiing	2	4	6
Luge	5	3	8
Nordic combined	4	—N/a	4
Short track speed skating	5	5	10
Skeleton	2	1	3
Ski jumping	1	1	2
Snowboarding	11	6	17
Speed skating	6	1	7
Total	72	47	119

== Medalists ==
The following Italian competitors won medals at the games. In the discipline sections below, the medalists' names are bolded.

Medal	Name	Sport	Event	Date
Gold	Arianna Fontana	Short track speed skating	Women's 500 metres	7 February
Gold	Stefania Constantini; Amos Mosaner	Curling	Mixed doubles	8 February
Silver	Francesca Lollobrigida	Speed skating	Women's 3000 metres	5 February
Silver	Arianna Fontana; Arianna Valcepina; Martina Valcepina; Pietro Sighel; Andrea Cassinelli; Yuri Confortola	Short track speed skating	Mixed 2000 metre relay	5 February
Silver	Federica Brignone	Alpine skiing	Women's giant slalom	7 February
Silver	Federico Pellegrino	Cross-country skiing	Men's sprint	8 February
Silver	Omar Visintin; Michela Moioli	Snowboarding	Mixed team snowboard cross	12 February
Silver	Sofia Goggia	Alpine skiing	Women's downhill	15 February
Silver	Arianna Fontana	Short track speed skating	Women's 1500 metres	16 February
Bronze	Dominik Fischnaller	Luge	Men's singles	6 February
Bronze	Omar Visintin	Snowboarding	Men's snowboard cross	10 February
Bronze	Davide Ghiotto	Speed skating	Men's 10,000 metres	11 February
Bronze	Dorothea Wierer	Biathlon	Women's sprint	11 February
Bronze	Nadia Delago	Alpine skiing	Women's downhill	15 February
Bronze	Pietro Sighel; Andrea Cassinelli; Yuri Confortola; Tommaso Dotti	Short track speed skating	Men's 5000 metre relay	16 February
Bronze	Federica Brignone	Alpine skiing	Women's combined	17 February
Bronze	Francesca Lollobrigida	Speed skating	Women's mass start	19 February

Medals by sport
**Sport**	1st place, gold medalist(s)	2nd place, silver medalist(s)	3rd place, bronze medalist(s)	Total
Alpine skiing	0	2	2	4
Biathlon	0	0	1	1
Cross-country skiing	0	1	0	1
Curling	1	0	0	1
Luge	0	0	1	1
Short track	1	2	1	4
Snowboarding	0	1	1	2
Speed skating	0	1	2	3
Total	2	7	8	17

Medals by date
**Day**	**Date**	1st place, gold medalist(s)	2nd place, silver medalist(s)	3rd place, bronze medalist(s)	Total
Day 1	February 5	0	2	0	2
Day 2	February 6	0	0	1	1
Day 3	February 7	1	1	0	2
Day 4	February 8	1	1	0	2
Day 5	February 9	0	0	0	0
Day 6	February 10	0	0	1	1
Day 7	February 11	0	0	2	2
Day 8	February 12	0	1	0	1
Day 9	February 13	0	0	0	0
Day 10	February 14	0	0	0	0
Day 11	February 15	0	1	1	2
Day 12	February 16	0	1	1	2
Day 13	February 17	0	0	1	1
Day 14	February 18	0	0	0	0
Day 15	February 19	0	0	1	1
Day 16	February 20	0	0	0	0
Total		2	7	8	17

Medals by gender
**Gender**	1st place, gold medalist(s)	2nd place, silver medalist(s)	3rd place, bronze medalist(s)	**Total**
Male	0	1	4	**5**
Female	1	4	4	**9**
Mixed	1	2	0	**3**
Total	2	7	8	17

== Alpine skiing ==
Italy qualified seven male and nine female alpine skiers.

Men

Athlete	Event	Run 1		Run 2		Total	
Athlete	Event	Time	Rank	Time	Rank	Time	Rank
Christof Innerhofer	Combined	1:44.19	7	51.61	11	2:35.80	10
Christof Innerhofer	Downhill	—N/a				DNF	
Matteo Marsaglia	Downhill	—N/a				1:44.06	15
Dominik Paris	Downhill	—N/a				1:43:21	6
Luca De Aliprandini	Men's giant slalom	1:03.42	6	DNF			
Tommaso Sala	Men's giant slalom	DNF		Did not advance			
Alex Vinatzer	Men's giant slalom	DNF		Did not advance			
Giuliano Razzoli	Men's slalom	54.79	12	50.26	4	1:45.05	8
Tommaso Sala	Men's slalom	54.37	8	51.00	19	1:45.37	11
Alex Vinatzer	Men's slalom	55.39	17	DNF			
Christof Innerhofer	Men's super-G	—N/a				DNF	
Matteo Marsaglia	Men's super-G	—N/a				1:22.16	18
Dominik Paris	Men's super-G	—N/a				1:22.62	21

Women

Athlete	Event	Run 1		Run 2		Total	
Athlete	Event	Time	Rank	Time	Rank	Time	Rank
Marta Bassino	Combined	1:33.45	13	DNF			
Federica Brignone	Combined	1:33.11	8	54.41	4	2:27.52	3rd place, bronze medalist(s)
Elena Curtoni	Combined	DNF		Did not advance			
Nicol Delago	Combined	1:33.12	9	DNF			
Elena Curtoni	Downhill	—N/a				1:32.87	5
Nadia Delago	Downhill	—N/a				1:32.44	3rd place, bronze medalist(s)
Nicol Delago	Downhill	—N/a				1:33.69	11
Sofia Goggia	Downhill	—N/a				1:32.03	2nd place, silver medalist(s)
Marta Bassino	Giant slalom	DNF		Did not advance			
Federica Brignone	Giant slalom	57.98	3	57.99	5	1:55.97	2nd place, silver medalist(s)
Elena Curtoni	Giant slalom	1:00.50	24	59.41	21	1:59.91	20
Federica Brignone	Slalom	54.41	20	DNF			
Lara Della Mea	Slalom	56.00	35	54.53	30	1:50.53	30
Anita Gulli	Slalom	55.46	32	54.32	29	1:49.78	29
Marta Bassino	Women's super-G	—N/a				1:15.08	17
Federica Brignone	Women's super-G	—N/a				1:14.17	7
Elena Curtoni	Women's super-G	—N/a				1:14.34	10
Francesca Marsaglia	Women's super-G	—N/a				1:15.61	22

Mixed

Athlete	Event	Round of 16	Quarterfinal	Semifinal	Final / BM	
Athlete	Event	Opposition Result	Opposition Result	Opposition Result	Opposition Result	Rank
Marta Bassino; Federica Brignone; Luca De Aliprandini; Alex Vinatzer	Team	ROC; W 3–1	United States; L 1-3	Did not advance		8

== Biathlon ==
Men

Athlete	Event	Time	Misses	Rank
Didier Bionaz	Individual	54:44.7	3 (1+1+1+0)	48
Thomas Bormolini	Individual	55:48.6	5 (0+1+2+2)	63
Lukas Hofer	Individual	52:43.6	2 (0+2+0+0)	27
Dominik Windisch	Individual	51:25.6	2 (0+0+1+1)	14
Lukas Hofer	Mass start	42:58.8	6 (1+1+2+2)	27
Dominik Windisch	Mass start	39:52.8	3 (0+2+1+0)	5
Thomas Bormolini	Pursuit	44:04.5	6 (0+1+1+4)	33
Lukas Hofer	Pursuit	39:58.6	0 (0+0+0+0)	4
Dominik Windisch	Pursuit	43:41.9	7 (1+1+3+2)	26
Thomas Bormolini	Sprint	25:44.1	1 (1+0)	23
Tommaso Giacomel	Sprint	26:52.2	4 (1+3)	61
Lukas Hofer	Sprint	25:19.6	1 (0+1)	14
Dominik Windisch	Sprint	25:51.6	2 (0+2)	30
Thomas Bormolini; Tommaso Giacomel; Lukas Hofer; Dominik Windisch	Men's relay	1:21:48.8	2+13	7

Women

Athlete	Event	Time	Misses	Rank
Michela Carrara	Individual	51:29.1	5 (1+2+1+1)	60
Federica Sanfilippo	Individual	50:09.3	5 (0+2+1+2)	49
Lisa Vittozzi	Individual	52:57.1	8 (5+1+2+0)	76
Dorothea Wierer	Individual	46:45.0	3 (0+1+0+2)	18
Dorothea Wierer	Mass start	43:41.0	8 (2+2+2+2)	22
Samuela Comola	Pursuit	40:10.4	3 (0+1+1+1)	37
Lisa Vittozzi	Pursuit	39:21.2	4 (1+2+0+1)	32
Dorothea Wierer	Pursuit	36:56.0	3 (0+0+2+1)	6
Samuela Comola	Sprint	23:30.7	1 (1+0)	57
Federica Sanfilippo	Sprint	24:57.1	5 (3+2)	82
Lisa Vittozzi	Sprint	23:09.1	4 (4+0)	36
Dorothea Wierer	Sprint	21:21.5	0 (0+0)	3rd place, bronze medalist(s)
Lisa Vittozzi; Dorothea Wierer; Samuela Comola; Federica Sanfilippo	Women's relay	1:12:37.0	0+5	5

Mixed

Athlete	Event	Time	Misses	Rank
Thomas Bormolini; Lukas Hofer; Lisa Vittozzi; Dorothea Wierer	Relay	1:09:25.3	2+14	9

== Bobsleigh ==
Athlete	Event	Run 1		Run 2		Run 3		Run 4		Total	
Athlete	Event	Time	Rank	Time	Rank	Time	Rank	Time	Rank	Time	Rank
Patrick Baumgartner*; Robert Mircea	Two-man	1:00.08	20	1:00.47	24	1:00.38	21	Did not advance		3:00.93	21
Patrick Baumgartner*; Eric Fantazzini; Alex Verginer; Lorenzo Bilotti	Four-man	59.36	17	59.72	20	59.34	15	59.28	4	3:57.70	15
Mattia Variola*; Robert Mircea; Alex Pagnini; Delmas Obou	Four-man	1:00.25	27	1:00.33	27	1:00.07	26	Did not advance		3:00.65	27
Giada Andreutti	Monobob	1:06.07	17	1:05.77	10	1:06.57	16	1:06.38	12	4:24.79	15

* – Denotes the driver of each sled

== Cross-country skiing ==
Italy has qualified six male and six female cross-country skiers.

Distance
Men

Athlete	Event	Classical		Freestyle		Final		
Athlete	Event	Time	Rank	Time	Rank	Time	Deficit	Rank
Francesco De Fabiani	Men's 15 km classical	—N/a				40:16.4	+2:21.6	18
Maicol Rastelli	Men's 15 km classical	—N/a				42:25.4	+4:30.6	52
Giandomenico Salvadori	Men's 15 km classical	—N/a				40:33.2	+2:38.4	22
Paolo Ventura	Men's 15 km classical	—N/a				41:12.2	+3:17.4	34
Francesco De Fabiani	30 km skiathlon	40:12.4	6	39:06.0	22	1:19:47.6	+3:37.8	8
Giandomenico Salvadori	30 km skiathlon	43:23.4	48	42:13.0	43	1:26:10.7	+10:00.9	48
Paolo Ventura	30 km skiathlon	42:41.0	40	40:46.8	30	1:24:00.4	+7.50.6	34
Giandomenico Salvadori	50 km freestyle	—N/a				1:14:49.1	+3:16.4	18
Paolo Ventura	50 km freestyle	—N/a				1:16:05.4	+4:32.7	32
Francesco De Fabiani; Davide Graz; Federico Pellegrino; Giandomenico Salvadori	4 × 10 km relay	—N/a				2:00:16.6	+5:25.9	8

Women

Athlete	Event	Classical		Freestyle		Final		
Athlete	Event	Time	Rank	Time	Rank	Time	Deficit	Rank
Anna Comarella	10 km classical	—N/a				30:45.0	+2:38.7	26
Martina Di Centa	10 km classical	—N/a				31:08.8	+3:02.5	37
Caterina Ganz	10 km classical	—N/a				31:08.1	+3:01.8	35
Lucia Scardoni	10 km classical	—N/a				31:09.5	+3:03.2	38
Anna Comarella	15 km skiathlon	24:24.1	26	24:19.0	44	49:27.8	+5:14.1	37
Martina Di Centa	15 km skiathlon	25:02.2	37	23:40.4	33	49:22.8	+5:09.1	36
Caterina Ganz	15 km skiathlon	24:37.1	31	24:29.4	48	49:53.9	+5:40.2	42
Cristina Pittin	15 km skiathlon	25:01.1	36	24:05.8	41	49:48.6	+5:34.9	41
Anna Comarella	30 km freestyle	—N/a				1:36:12.4	+11:18.4	40
Martina Di Centa	30 km freestyle	—N/a				1:33:56.6	+9:02.6	34
Caterina Ganz	30 km freestyle	—N/a				1:38:19.5	+13:25.5	45
Cristina Pittin	30 km freestyle	—N/a				1:33:54.8	+9:00.8	33
Anna Comarella; Caterina Ganz; Martina Di Centa; Lucia Scardoni	4 x 5 km relay	—N/a				57:20.5	+3:39.5	8

Sprint

Athlete	Event	Qualification		Quarterfinal		Semifinal		Final	
Athlete	Event	Time	Rank	Time	Rank	Time	Rank	Time	Rank
Francesco De Fabiani	Men's	2:55.56	35	Did not advance					
Davide Graz	Men's	2:53.58	25 Q	2:56.09	6	Did not advance			28
Federico Pellegrino	Men's	2:49.55	6 Q	2:53.08	1 Q	2:52.17	1 Q	2:58.32	2nd place, silver medalist(s)
Maicol Rastelli	Men's	3:02.04	51	Did not advance					
Francesco De Fabiani; Federico Pellegrino	Men's team	—N/a				20:06.99	1 Q	19:48.42	6
Caterina Ganz	Women's	3:24.13	30 Q	3:24.04	6	Did not advance			30
Greta Laurent	Women's	3:22.84	25 Q	3:26.96	6	Did not advance			28
Cristina Pittin	Women's	3:30.64	47	Did not advance					
Lucia Scardoni	Women's	3:23.61	29 Q	3:27.07	6	Did not advance			29
Caterina Ganz; Lucia Scardoni	Women's team	—N/a				23:47.06	7	Did not advance	13

== Curling ==
Summary

Team	Event	Group stage										Semifinal	Final / BM	
Team	Event	Opposition Score	Opposition Score	Opposition Score	Opposition Score	Opposition Score	Opposition Score	Opposition Score	Opposition Score	Opposition Score	Rank	Opposition Score	Opposition Score	Rank
Joël Retornaz; Amos Mosaner; Sebastiano Arman; Simone Gonin; Mattia Giovanella	Men's tournament	GBR; L 5–7	SWE; L 3–9	CHN; L 9–12	ROC; L 7–10	SUI; W 8–4	CAN; L 3–7	USA; W 10–4	DEN; W 10–3	NOR; L 4–9	9	Did not advance		
Stefania Constantini; Amos Mosaner	Mixed doubles tournament	USA; W 8–4	SUI; W 8–7	NOR; W 11–8	CZE; W 10–2	AUS; W 7–3	GBR; W 7–5	CHN; W 8–4	SWE; W 12–8	CAN; W 8–7	1 Q	SWE; W 8–1	NOR; W 8–5	1st place, gold medalist(s)

=== Men's tournament ===
Italy has qualified their men's team (five athletes), by finishing second in the 2021 Olympic Qualification Event.

Final Round Robin Standings
Team	Skip	Pld	W	L	W–L	PF	PA	EW	EL	BE	SE	S%	DSC	Qualification
Great Britain	Bruce Mouat	9	8	1	–	63	44	39	31	5	10	88.0%	18.81	Playoffs
Sweden	Niklas Edin	9	7	2	–	64	44	43	30	10	11	85.7%	14.02	Playoffs
Canada	Brad Gushue	9	5	4	1–0	58	50	34	38	7	7	84.4%	26.49	Playoffs
United States	John Shuster	9	5	4	0–1	56	61	35	41	4	5	83.0%	32.29	Playoffs
China	Ma Xiuyue	9	4	5	2–1; 1–0	59	62	39	36	6	4	85.4%	23.55	
Norway	Steffen Walstad	9	4	5	2–1; 0–1	58	53	40	36	0	11	84.4%	20.96	
Switzerland	Peter de Cruz	9	4	5	1–2; 1–0	51	54	33	38	13	3	84.5%	15.74	
ROC	Sergey Glukhov	9	4	5	1–2; 0–1	58	58	33	38	6	6	81.2%	33.72	
Italy	Joël Retornaz	9	3	6	–	59	65	36	35	3	8	81.7%	30.76	
Denmark	Mikkel Krause	9	1	8	–	36	71	30	39	3	2	78.1%	32.84	

Round robin

Italy had a bye in draws 1, 4 and 9.

Draw 2

Thursday, 10 February, 14:05

Sheet D	1	2	3	4	5	6	7	8	9	10	Final
Great Britain (Mouat)	0	1	0	2	0	0	2	1	0	1	7
Italy (Retornaz) 🔨	2	0	1	0	0	1	0	0	1	0	5

Draw 3

Friday, 11 February, 9:05

Sheet C	1	2	3	4	5	6	7	8	9	10	Final
Sweden (Edin) 🔨	0	1	0	2	0	3	0	3	X	X	9
Italy (Retornaz)	0	0	1	0	1	0	1	0	X	X	3

Draw 5

Saturday, 12 February, 14:05

Sheet A	1	2	3	4	5	6	7	8	9	10	Final
Italy (Retornaz)	0	1	0	3	0	2	1	0	2	0	9
China (Ma) 🔨	2	0	3	0	3	0	0	3	0	1	12

Draw 6

Sunday, 13 February, 9:05

Sheet D	1	2	3	4	5	6	7	8	9	10	Final
Italy (Retornaz)	0	0	3	0	3	0	0	1	0	X	7
ROC (Glukhov) 🔨	0	3	0	3	0	0	1	0	3	X	10

Draw 7

Sunday, 13 February, 20:05

Sheet B	1	2	3	4	5	6	7	8	9	10	Final
Switzerland (de Cruz) 🔨	1	0	1	0	2	0	0	0	0	X	4
Italy (Retornaz)	0	1	0	1	0	3	0	1	2	X	8

Draw 8

Monday, 14 February, 14:05

Sheet A	1	2	3	4	5	6	7	8	9	10	Final
Canada (Gushue)	1	0	1	0	0	2	0	0	3	X	7
Italy (Retornaz) 🔨	0	1	0	1	0	0	0	1	0	X	3

Draw 10

Tuesday, 15 February, 20:05

Sheet B	1	2	3	4	5	6	7	8	9	10	Final
Italy (Retornaz) 🔨	1	0	2	0	2	0	1	4	X	X	10
United States (Shuster)	0	2	0	1	0	1	0	0	X	X	4

Draw 11

Wednesday, 16 February, 14:05

Sheet C	1	2	3	4	5	6	7	8	9	10	Final
Italy (Retornaz)	0	2	2	1	0	4	1	X	X	X	10
Denmark (Krause) 🔨	2	0	0	0	1	0	0	X	X	X	3

Draw 12

Thursday, 17 February, 9:05

Sheet D	1	2	3	4	5	6	7	8	9	10	Final
Norway (Walstad)	0	0	2	0	1	0	2	2	2	X	9
Italy (Retornaz) 🔨	1	1	0	2	0	0	0	0	0	X	4

=== Mixed doubles tournament ===
Italy has qualified their mixed doubles team (two athletes), by finishing in the top seven teams in the 2021 World Mixed Doubles Curling Championship.

Final Round Robin Standings
Team	Athletes	Pld	W	L	W–L	PF	PA	EW	EL	BE	SE	S%	DSC	Qualification
Italy	Stefania Constantini / Amos Mosaner	9	9	0	–	79	48	43	28	0	17	79%	25.34	Playoffs
Norway	Kristin Skaslien / Magnus Nedregotten	9	6	3	1–0	68	50	40	28	0	15	82%	24.48	Playoffs
Great Britain	Jennifer Dodds / Bruce Mouat	9	6	3	0–1	60	50	38	33	0	12	79%	22.48	Playoffs
Sweden	Almida de Val / Oskar Eriksson	9	5	4	1–0	55	54	35	33	0	10	76%	21.77	Playoffs
Canada	Rachel Homan / John Morris	9	5	4	0–1	57	54	33	39	0	8	78%	53.73	
Czech Republic	Zuzana Paulová / Tomáš Paul	9	4	5	–	50	65	29	39	1	7	75%	33.41	
Switzerland	Jenny Perret / Martin Rios	9	3	6	1–0	55	58	32	39	0	6	73%	39.04	
United States	Vicky Persinger / Chris Plys	9	3	6	0–1	50	67	34	36	0	9	74%	27.29	
China	Fan Suyuan / Ling Zhi	9	2	7	1–0	51	64	34	36	0	7	74%	17.81	
Australia	Tahli Gill / Dean Hewitt	9	2	7	0–1	52	67	31	38	1	8	72%	50.51	

Round robin

Italy had a bye in draws 1, 4, 7 and 10.

Draw 2

Thursday, 3 February, 9:05

Sheet C	1	2	3	4	5	6	7	8	Final
United States (Persinger / Plys) 🔨	1	0	0	1	1	1	0	0	4
Italy (Constantini / Mosaner)	0	4	1	0	0	0	1	2	8

Draw 3

Thursday, 3 February, 14:05

Sheet A	1	2	3	4	5	6	7	8	9	Final
Italy (Constantini / Mosaner)	0	3	0	1	1	0	2	0	1	8
Switzerland (Perret / Rios) 🔨	1	0	2	0	0	3	0	1	0	7

Draw 5

Friday, 4 February, 8:35

Sheet D	1	2	3	4	5	6	7	8	Final
Italy (Constantini / Mosaner)	3	0	2	0	2	2	0	2	11
Norway (Skaslien / Nedregotten) 🔨	0	5	0	1	0	0	2	0	8

Draw 6

Friday, 4 February, 13:35

Sheet A	1	2	3	4	5	6	7	8	Final
Czech Republic (Paulová / Paul)	0	0	1	0	0	1	X	X	2
Italy (Constantini / Mosaner) 🔨	4	1	0	4	1	0	X	X	10

Draw 8

Saturday, 5 February, 14:05

Sheet D	1	2	3	4	5	6	7	8	Final
Australia (Gill / Hewitt)	1	0	0	1	0	1	0	X	3
Italy (Constantini / Mosaner) 🔨	0	2	1	0	1	0	3	X	7

Draw 9

Saturday, 5 February, 20:05

Sheet A	1	2	3	4	5	6	7	8	Final
Great Britain (Dodds / Mouat)	0	1	1	0	0	2	0	1	5
Italy (Constantini / Mosaner) 🔨	1	0	0	2	1	0	3	0	7

Draw 11

Sunday, 6 February, 14:05

Sheet C	1	2	3	4	5	6	7	8	Final
Italy (Constantini / Mosaner)	3	1	0	1	0	1	1	1	8
China (Fan / Ling) 🔨	0	0	1	0	3	0	0	0	4

Draw 12

Sunday, 6 February, 20:05

Sheet B	1	2	3	4	5	6	7	8	Final
Italy (Constantini / Mosaner)	0	1	1	1	0	5	0	4	12
Sweden (de Val / Eriksson) 🔨	2	0	0	0	3	0	3	0	8

Draw 13

Monday, 7 February, 9:05

Sheet B	1	2	3	4	5	6	7	8	9	Final
Canada (Homan / Morris)	0	2	0	0	2	0	3	0	0	7
Italy (Constantini / Mosaner) 🔨	1	0	1	2	0	1	0	2	1	8

Semifinal

Monday, 7 February, 20:05

Sheet C	1	2	3	4	5	6	7	8	Final
Italy (Constantini / Mosaner) 🔨	1	1	2	1	1	0	2	X	8
Sweden (de Val / Eriksson)	0	0	0	0	0	1	0	X	1

Final

Tuesday, 8 February, 20:05

Sheet B	1	2	3	4	5	6	7	8	Final
Italy (Constantini / Mosaner) 🔨	0	2	1	3	0	1	0	1	8
Norway (Skaslien / Nedregotten)	2	0	0	0	1	0	2	0	5

== Figure skating ==
In the 2021 World Figure Skating Championships in Stockholm, Sweden, Italy secured two quota in both the men's and pairs competitions, and one quota in the ice dance competition.

Singles

Athlete	Event	SP		FS		Total	
Athlete	Event	Points	Rank	Points	Rank	Points	Rank
Daniel Grassl	Men's	90.64	12 Q	187.43	5	278.07	7
Matteo Rizzo	Men's	88.63	13 Q	158.90	17	247.53	16
Charlène Guignard; Marco Fabbri	Ice dance	82.68	7 Q	124.37	5	207.05	5
Nicole Della Monica; Matteo Guarise	Pairs	63.58	10 Q	116.29	13	179.87	13
Rebecca Ghilardi; Filippo Ambrosini	Pairs	55.83	16 Q	109.60	14	165.43	14

Team event

Athlete	Event	Short program/Short dance						Free skate/Free dance					
Athlete	Event	Men's	Ladies'	Pairs	Ice dance	Total		Men's	Ladies'	Pairs	Ice dance	Total	
Athlete	Event	Points Team points	Points Team points	Points Team points	Points Team points	Points	Rank	Points Team points	Points Team points	Points Team points	Points Team points	Points	Rank
Daniel Grassl; Lara Naki Gutmann; Nicole Della Monica / Matteo Guarise; Charlène Guignard / Marco Fabbri	Team event	88.10; 6	58.52; 2	60.30; 4	83.83; 8	20	7	Did not advance					

== Freestyle Skiing ==
Freeski

Athlete	Event	Qualification					Final				
Athlete	Event	Run 1	Run 2	Run 3	Best	Rank	Run 1	Run 2	Run 3	Best	Rank
Leonardo Donaggio	Men's big air	90.25	~~70.25~~	80.25	170.50	10 Q	91.00	81.00	~~17.25~~	172.00	5
Leonardo Donaggio	Men's slopestyle	63.48	~~42.88~~	—N/a	63.48	18	Did not advance				
Silvia Bertagna	Women's big air	17.00	~~16.75~~	DNS	17.00	25	Did not advance				
Silvia Bertagna	Women's slopestyle	65.25	68.90	—N/a	68.90	8 Q	48.50	61.85	7.83	61.85	10
Elisa Maria Nakab	Women's slopestyle	8.60	32.70	—N/a	32.70	24	Did not advance				

Ski cross

Athlete	Event	Seeding		1/8 final	Quarterfinal	Semifinal	Final	
Athlete	Event	Time	Rank	Position	Position	Position	Position	Rank
Simone Deromedis	Men's	1:12.48	8	1 Q	2 Q	3 SF	1	5
Lucrezia Fantelli	Women's	1:18.17	6	DNF	Did not advance			17
Jole Galli	Women's	1:19.20	12	2 Q	3	Did not advance		10

== Luge ==
Men

Athlete	Event	Run 1		Run 2		Run 3		Run 4		Total	
Athlete	Event	Time	Rank	Time	Rank	Time	Rank	Time	Rank	Time	Rank
Leon Felderer	Singles	57.814	12	58.211	11	57.855	11	57.960	14	3:51.840	11
Dominik Fischnaller	Singles	57.361	3	57.444	3	57.461	5	57.420	3	3:49.686	3rd place, bronze medalist(s)
Kevin Fischnaller	Singles	DNS									-
Emanuel Rieder; Simon Kainzwaldner	Doubles	58.602	4	58.995	7	—N/a				1:57.597	6

Women

Athlete	Event	Run 1		Run 2		Run 3		Run 4		Total	
Athlete	Event	Time	Rank	Time	Rank	Time	Rank	Time	Rank	Time	Rank
Verena Hofer	Singles	58.960	9	59.037	9	58.961	16	59.584	16	3:56.542	13
Andrea Vötter	Singles	59.145	14	59.045	10	58.852	10	58.935	11	3:55.977	10
Nina Zöggeler	Singles	59.464	18	59.160	16	59.085	19	59.275	14	3:56.984	15

Mixed

Athlete	Event	Run 1		Run 2		Run 3		Total	
Athlete	Event	Time	Rank	Time	Rank	Time	Rank	Time	Rank
Andrea Vötter; Leon Felderer; Emanuel Rieder / Simon Kainzwaldner	Team relay	1:00.618	5	1:01.960	5	1:02.274	4	3:04.852	5

== Nordic combined ==
Athlete	Event	Ski jumping			Cross-country		Total	
Athlete	Event	Distance	Points	Rank	Time	Rank	Time	Rank
Iacopo Bortolas	Individual large hill/10 km	121.5	87.7	29	29:01.6	43	32:29.6	39
Raffaele Buzzi	Individual large hill/10 km	124.0	98.7	21	26:34.9	16	29:18.9	22
Samuel Costa	Individual large hill/10 km	110.0	64.3	40	27:20.3	25	32:22.3	38
Alessandro Pittin	Individual large hill/10 km	105.0	55.8	43	25:55.8	6	31:31.8	33
Iacopo Bortolas	Individual normal hill/10 km	93.5	97.0	26	27:30.8	38	29:54.8	33
Raffaele Buzzi	Individual normal hill/10 km	93.0	99.9	22	24:47.3	10	26:59.3	16
Alessandro Pittin	Individual normal hill/10 km	75.5	62.9	40	24:53.4	12	29:33.4	32
Iacopo Bortolas; Raffaele Buzzi; Samuel Costa; Alessandro Pittin	Team large hill/4 × 5 km	455.0	320.1	9	53:40.0	9	57:07.0	9

== Short track speed skating ==
Italy has qualified the maximum five male and five female athletes and will participate in the men's, women's, and mixed relays.

Men

Athlete	Event	Heat		Quarterfinal		Semifinal		Final	
Athlete	Event	Time	Rank	Time	Rank	Time	Rank	Time	Rank
Andrea Cassinelli	500 m	42.791	3	Did not advance					23
Pietro Sighel	500 m	40.350	2 Q	40.644	2 Q	40.847	2 QA	No time	5
Pietro Sighel	1000 m	2:10.039	3 AA	PEN		Did not advance			18
Luca Spechenhauser	1000 m	PEN		Did not advance					
Yuri Confortola	1500 m	—N/a		2:12.853	4 q	5 ADVA		2:12.384	10
Pietro Sighel	1500 m	—N/a		PEN		Did not advance			
Luca Spechenhauser	1500 m	—N/a		2:56.796	6	Did not advance			32
Andrea Cassinelli; Yuri Confortola; Tommaso Dotti; Pietro Sighel	5000 m relay	—N/a				6:38.899	2 FA	6:43.431	3rd place, bronze medalist(s)

Women

Athlete	Event	Heat		Quarterfinal		Semifinal		Final	
Athlete	Event	Time	Rank	Time	Rank	Time	Rank	Time	Rank
Arianna Fontana	500 m	42.940	1 Q	42.635	1 Q	42.387	1 QA	42.488	1st place, gold medalist(s)
Arianna Valcepina	500 m	43.070	3 q	42.891	2 Q	44.044	5	Did not advance	9
Martina Valcepina	500 m	43.606	2 Q	PEN		Did not advance			20
Arianna Fontana	1000 m	1:30.066	1 Q	1:29.324	1 Q	1:26.811	2 FA	PEN	10
Cynthia Mascitto	1000 m	1:28.471	3	Did not advance					21
Arianna Fontana	1500 m	—N/a		2:32.946	2 Q	2:22.196	2 FA	2:17.862	2nd place, silver medalist(s)
Cynthia Mascitto	1500 m	—N/a		2:20.268	3 Q	2:20.272	3 FB	2:45.697	12
Arianna Sighel	1500 m	—N/a		2:22.318	5	Did not advance			28
Arianna Fontana; Cynthia Mascitto; Arianna Valcepina; Martina Valcepina	3000 m relay	—N/a				4:17.438	4 FB	4:09.688	5

Mixed

Athlete	Event	Quarterfinal		Semifinal		Final	
Athlete	Event	Time	Rank	Time	Rank	Time	Rank
Andrea Cassinelli; Yuri Confortola; Arianna Fontana; Pietro Sighel; Arianna Valcepina; Martina Valcepina	2000 m relay	2:38.308	2 Q	2:36.895	2 QA	2:37.364	2nd place, silver medalist(s)

== Skeleton ==
Athlete	Event	Run 1		Run 2		Run 3		Run 4		Total	
Athlete	Event	Time	Rank	Time	Rank	Time	Rank	Time	Rank	Time	Rank
Amedeo Bagnis	Men's	1:01.05	10	1:01.19	14	1:00.83	11	1:01.01	12	4:04.08	11
Mattia Gaspari	Men's	1:01.20	12	1:01.31	15	1:01.16	15	1:01.36	16	4:05.03	14
Valentina Margaglio	Women's	1:02.84	17	1:03.04	15	1:02.45	14	1:02.05	3	4:10.38	12

== Ski jumping ==
Men

Athlete	Event	Qualification			First round			Final			Total	
Athlete	Event	Distance	Points	Rank	Distance	Points	Rank	Distance	Points	Rank	Points	Rank
Giovanni Bresadola	Large hill	117.5	97.0	35 Q	127.0	114.6	35	Did not advance				
Giovanni Bresadola	Normal hill	94.0	91.8	21 Q	93.5	110.3	41	Did not advance				

Women

Athlete	Event	First round			Final			Total	
Athlete	Event	Distance	Points	Rank	Distance	Points	Rank	Points	Rank
Jessica Malsiner	Normal hill	76.5	62.0	30 Q	75.5	62.4	27	124.4	29

== Snowboarding ==
Freestyle

Athlete	Event	Qualification					Final				
Athlete	Event	Run 1	Run 2	Run 3	Best	Rank	Run 1	Run 2	Run 3	Best	Rank
Emiliano Lauzi	Men's big air	~~23.50~~	80.75	12.25	93.00	22	Did not advance				
Lorenzo Gennero	Men's halfpipe	34.75	2.00	—N/a	34.75	19	Did not advance				
Louie Vito	Men's halfpipe	60.25	3.25	—N/a	60.25	13	Did not advance				
Emiliano Lauzi	Men's slopestyle	71.71	47.76	—N/a	71.71	7 Q	80.01	27.48	39.48	80.01	5

Parallel

Athlete	Event	Qualification		Round of 16	Quarterfinal	Semifinal	Final	
Athlete	Event	Time	Rank	Opposition Time	Opposition Time	Opposition Time	Opposition Time	Rank
Daniele Bagozza	Men's giant slalom	1:22.48	16 Q	Lee (KOR); L +0.92	Did not advance			15
Edwin Coratti	Men's giant slalom	1:22.49	17	Did not advance				
Mirko Felicetti	Men's giant slalom	1:22.26	12 Q	Kwiatkowski (POL); L DNF	Did not advance			12
Roland Fischnaller	Men's giant slalom	1:21.59	6 Q	Košir (SLO); W	Prommegger (AUT); W	Karl (AUT); L DNF	Wild (ROC); L DNF	4
Lucia Dalmasso	Women's giant slalom	1:47.68	29	Did not advance				
Nadya Ochner	Women's giant slalom	1:28.84	16 Q	Ledecká (CZE); L DNF	Did not advance			16

Snowboard cross

Athlete	Event	Seeding		1/8 final	Quarterfinal	Semifinal	Final	
Athlete	Event	Time	Rank	Position	Position	Position	Position	Rank
Filippo Ferrari	Men's	1:24.77	31	DNS	Did not advance			31
Tommaso Leoni	Men's	1:18.13	19	1 Q	2 Q	4 FB	4	8
Lorenzo Sommariva	Men's	1:17.98	9	DNF	Did not advance			26
Omar Visintin	Men's	1:17.68	6	1 Q	1 Q	2 FA	3	3rd place, bronze medalist(s)
Sofia Belingheri	Women's	1:27.81	29	3	Did not advance			24
Caterina Carpano	Women's	1:24.87	11	2 Q	3	Did not advance		10
Francesca Gallina	Women's	1:25.27	22	3	Did not advance			22
Michela Moioli	Women's	1:22.19	1	1 Q	1 Q	3 FB	DNF	8
Omar Visintin; Michela Moioli	Mixed team	—N/a			1 Q	1 FA	2	2nd place, silver medalist(s)
Lorenzo Sommariva; Caterina Carpano	Mixed team	—N/a			2 Q	1 FA	4	4

== Speed skating ==
Men

Athlete	Event	Race	
Athlete	Event	Time	Rank
David Bosa	500 m	35.168	23
Jeffrey Rosanelli	500 m	35.08	19
David Bosa	1000 m	1:09.35	15
Alessio Trentini	1500 m	1:48.33	25
Davide Ghiotto	5000 m	6:16.92	8
Andrea Giovannini	5000 m	6:30.11	20
Michele Malfatti	5000 m	6:21.47	15
Davide Ghiotto	10,000 m	12:45.98 NR	3rd place, bronze medalist(s)
Michele Malfatti	10,000 m	13:01.42	9

Women

Athlete	Event	Race	
Athlete	Event	Time	Rank
Francesca Lollobrigida	1500 m	1:55.20	6
Francesca Lollobrigida	3000 m	3:58.06	2nd place, silver medalist(s)
Francesca Lollobrigida	5000 m	6:51.76	4

Mass start

Athlete	Event	Semifinals			Finals		
Athlete	Event	Points	Time	Rank	Points	Time	Rank
Andrea Giovannini	Men's	60	7:43.58	1 Q	0	7:47.93	11
Michele Malfatti	Men's	1	8:02.09	11	Did not advance		20
Francesca Lollobrigida	Women's	62	8:34.19	1 Q	20	8:14.98	3rd place, bronze medalist(s)

Team Pursuit

Athlete	Event	Quarterfinal		Semifinal		Final	
Athlete	Event	Opposition Time	Rank	Opposition Time	Rank	Opposition Time	Rank
Davide Ghiotto; Andrea Giovannini; Michele Malfatti	Men's	3:42.04	7 FD	Did not advance		Final D China; W 3:44.20	7

== See also ==
- Italy at the 2022 Winter Paralympics
