= Short-track speed skating at the 2022 Winter Olympics – Women's 3000 metre relay =

Women's 3000 metre relay at the XXIV Olympic Winter Games
- Short track speed skating
- Venue: Capital Indoor Stadium, Beijing
- Date: 9 and 13 February 2022
- Competitors: 34 from 8 nations
- Teams: 8
- Winning time: 4:03.409

Medalists
1st place, gold medalist(s)		Selma Poutsma; Suzanne Schulting; Yara van Kerkhof; Xandra Velzeboer	Netherlands
2nd place, silver medalist(s)		Choi Min-jeong; Kim A-lang; Lee Yu-bin; Seo Whi-min	South Korea
3rd place, bronze medalist(s)		Fan Kexin; Han Yutong; Qu Chunyu; Zhang Chutong; Zhang Yuting	China

The women's 3000 metre relay competition in short track speed skating at the 2022 Winter Olympics was held on 9 February (semifinals) and 13 February (finals), at the Capital Indoor Stadium in Beijing. The event was won by Suzanne Schulting, Selma Poutsma, Xandra Velzeboer, and Yara van Kerkhof, representing the Netherlands. They set a new Olympic record in Final A. It was the first time a European team won the event. South Korea won silver, and China bronze.

The defending champions were South Korea, with Italy and the Netherlands being second and third in 2018. The Netherlands were the 2021 World Short Track Speed Skating champion, France and Italy are the silver and bronze medalists, respectively. Many top athletes did not participate in the championship, however. The Netherlands were leading the 2021–22 ISU Short Track Speed Skating World Cup with four races completed before the Olympics, followed by South Korea and Canada.

== Qualification ==
The top with the top 8 countries qualified a relay through the 2021–22 ISU Short Track Speed Skating World Cup, including host nation China.

== Records ==
Prior to this competition, the existing world and Olympic records were as follows.

World record	Netherlands; Selma Poutsma; Suzanne Schulting; Yara van Kerkhof; Xandra Velzeboer	4:02.809	Beijing, China	23 October 2021
Olympic record	Netherlands; Suzanne Schulting; Yara van Kerkhof; Lara van Ruijven; Jorien ter Mors	4:03.471	Gangneung, South Korea	20 February 2018

A new Olympic record was set during the competition.

Date	Round	Athlete	Time	Record	Ref
13 February	Final A	Netherlands; Suzanne Schulting; Selma Poutsma; Xandra Velzeboer; Yara van Kerkhof	4:03.409	OR	

== Results ==
=== Semifinals ===
Rank	Heat	Country	Athletes	Time	Notes
1	1	Netherlands	Suzanne Schulting; Selma Poutsma; Xandra Velzeboer; Yara van Kerkhof	4:04.133	QA
2	1	China	Han Yutong; Qu Chunyu; Fan Kexin; Zhang Yuting	4:04.383	QA
3	1	Poland	Nikola Mazur; Natalia Maliszewska; Kamila Stormowska; Patrycja Maliszewska	4:10.074	QB
4	1	Italy	Arianna Fontana; Cynthia Mascitto; Martina Valcepina; Arianna Valcepina	4:17.438	QB
1	2	Canada	Courtney Sarault; Florence Brunelle; Kim Boutin; Alyson Charles	4:05.893	QA
2	2	South Korea	Seo Whi-min; Choi Min-jeong; Kim A-lang; Lee Yu-bin	4:05.904	QA
3	2	ROC	Sofia Prosvirnova; Ekaterina Efremenkova; Elena Seregina; Anna Vostrikova	4:06.064	QB
4	2	United States	Kristen Santos; Corinne Stoddard; Maame Biney; Julie Letai	4:06.098	QB

=== Finals ===
==== Final B ====
Rank	Country	Athletes	Time	Notes
5	Italy	Arianna Fontana; Martina Valcepina; Arianna Sighel; Arianna Valcepina	4:09.688	
6	Poland	Nikola Mazur; Natalia Maliszewska; Kamila Stormowska; Patrycja Maliszewska	4:10.210	
	ROC	Sofia Prosvirnova; Ekaterina Efremenkova; Elena Seregina; Anna Vostrikova		PEN
	United States	Kristen Santos; Corinne Stoddard; Maame Biney; Julie Letai		PEN

==== Final A ====
Rank	Country	Athletes	Time	Notes
1st place, gold medalist(s)	Netherlands	Suzanne Schulting; Selma Poutsma; Xandra Velzeboer; Yara van Kerkhof	4:03.409	OR
2nd place, silver medalist(s)	South Korea	Seo Whi-min; Choi Min-jeong; Kim A-lang; Lee Yu-bin	4:03.627	
3rd place, bronze medalist(s)	China	Qu Chunyu; Zhang Chutong; Fan Kexin; Zhang Yuting	4:03.863	
4	Canada	Courtney Sarault; Florence Brunelle; Kim Boutin; Alyson Charles	4:04.329	
