= Valcepina =

Valcepina is a surname. Notable people with the surname include:

- Arianna Valcepina (born 1994), Italian short-track speed skater
- Martina Valcepina (born 1992), Italian short-track speed skater
