= 2017 World Junior Short Track Speed Skating Championships =

International speed skating competition

- Venue: OlympiaWorld Innsbruck, Innsbruck, Austria
- Dates: 27–29 January
- Competitors: 198 from 40 nations

The 2017 World Junior Short Track Speed Skating Championships took place from 27 to 29 January 2017 in Innsbruck, Austria.

== Medal summary ==
=== Medal table ===
Rank	Nation	Gold	Silver	Bronze	Total
1	South Korea	5	4	0	9
2	Hungary	4	0	1	5
3	China	1	2	1	4
4	Russia	0	3	2	5
5	United States	0	1	2	3
6	Japan	0	0	4	4
Totals (6 entries)		10	10	10	30

=== Men's events ===
The results of the Championships:

Event	Gold		Silver		Bronze	
500 metres	Shaoang Liu (HUN)	40.483	Thomas Hong (USA)	40.601	Kazuki Yoshinaga (JPN)	40.657
1000 metres	Shaoang Liu (HUN)	1:25.020	Kim Si-un (KOR)	1:25.183	Wang Pengyu (CHN)	1:25.269
1500 metres	Shaoang Liu (HUN)	2:18.542	Alexander Shulginov (RUS)	2:18.647	Kazuki Yoshinaga (JPN)	2:19.829
3000 metre relay	South Korea; Moon Won-jun; Park Noh-won; Kim Si-un; Jung Hok-young	3:57.047	China; Jia Haidong; Wang Haotian; Wang Pengyu; Xu Chongyang	3:58.312	United States; Aaron Heo; Thomas Hong; Brandon Kim; Benjamin Thornock	3:59.000
Overall Classification	Shaoang Liu (HUN)	123 pts.	Kim Si-un (KOR)	56 pts.	Kazuki Yoshinaga (JPN)	39 pts.

=== Women's events ===
The results of the Championships:

Event	Gold		Silver		Bronze	
500 metres	Lee Yu-bin (KOR)	44.075	Sofia Prosvirnova (RUS)	44.118	Maame Biney (USA)	44.201
1000 metres	Lee Yu-bin (KOR)	1:30.276	Seo Whi-min (KOR)	1:30.730	Sofia Prosvirnova (RUS)	1:30.791
1500 metres	Seo Whi-min (KOR)	2:24.563	Li Jinyu (CHN)	2:24.720	Petra Jászapáti (HUN)	2:24.901
3000 metre relay	China; Gong Li; Li Jinyu; Luo Linyun; Song Yang	4:13.625	Russia; Ekaterina Efremenkova; Sofia Prosvirnova; Yulia Shishkina; Angelina Tarasova	4:14.270	Japan; Ami Hirai; Shione Kaminaga; Aoi Watanabe; Miwako Yamaura	4:14.347
Overall Classification	Lee Yu-bin (KOR)	104 pts.	Seo Whi-min (KOR)	61 pts.	Sofia Prosvirnova (RUS)	42 pts.

== Participating nations ==
- Australia
- Austria
- Belgium
- Bosnia and Herzegovina
- Belarus
- Bulgaria
- Canada
- China
- Croatia
- Czech Republic
- Spain
- France
- Great Britain
- Germany
- Hong Kong
- Hungary
- Ireland
- India
- Italy
- Japan
- Kazakhstan
- Korea Republic
- Latvia
- Lithuania
- Luxembourg
- Malaysia
- Netherlands
- New Zealand
- Poland
- Romania
- Russia
- Singapore
- Slovenia
- Serbia
- Slovakia
- Sweden
- Chinese Taipei
- Turkey
- Ukraine
- United States of America

== See also ==
- Short track speed skating
- World Junior Short Track Speed Skating Championships
