= Short-track speed skating at the 2022 Winter Olympics – Mixed 2000 metre relay =

Mixed 2000 metre relay at the XXIV Olympic Winter Games
- Short track speed skating
- Venue: Capital Indoor Stadium, Beijing
- Date: 5 February 2022
- Competitors: 59 from 12 nations
- Teams: 12
- Winning time: 2:37.348

Medalists
1st place, gold medalist(s)		Qu Chunyu; Fan Kexin; Wu Dajing; Ren Ziwei; Zhang Yuting	China
2nd place, silver medalist(s)		Arianna Fontana; Arianna Valcepina; Martina Valcepina; Pietro Sighel; Andrea Cassinelli; Yuri Confortola	Italy
3rd place, bronze medalist(s)		Petra Jászapáti; Zsófia Kónya; Shaoang Liu; Shaolin Sándor Liu; John-Henry Krueger	Hungary

The mixed 2000 metre relay competition in short track speed skating at the 2022 Winter Olympics was held on 5 February, at the Capital Indoor Stadium in Beijing. This will be the first time a mixed short track speed skating event is featured at the Olympics.

In July 2018, the International Olympic Committee (IOC) officially added the mixed relay to the Olympic program held over a distance of 2000 metres. Due to the addition of the event, the competition schedule was increased to six days from five.

China was favored after leading the 2021–22 ISU Short Track Speed Skating World Cup with four races completed before the Olympics, followed by the Netherlands and Hungary.

The Dutch team set an Olympic record in the quarterfinals, but after a fall finished last in their semifinal. South Korea did not advance to semifinals, also after a fall. In the semi-finals, the United States was disqualified for "blocking by infield skater" and the Russian Olympic Committee was disqualified because of "extra team skater causing obstruction", after finishing second and fourth, respectively. This resulted in China, who finished third in their semifinal, having been promoted to Final A.

In Final A, Hungary and Canada crashed in the first turn, forcing the officials to call a restart. In the repeat, Italy and China were leading more than halfway through the race when Canada's Florence Brunelle and Hungary's Petra Jászapáti collided, with both sliding off the course. Both teams recovered to finish the race, but after review, Canada received a penalty for a push from behind and Hungary finished at third place.

China won gold ahead of a late sprint by Italy’s Pietro Sighel at the finish line.

== Qualification ==
The top 12 countries qualified a relay through the 2021–22 ISU Short Track Speed Skating World Cup, including host nation China. If a county needed an additional quota spot to complete a relay, it was awarded an additional quota. Italy and the ROC were awarded an additional male athlete spot, while Kazakhstan and Poland were awarded an additional female spot.

== Records ==
Prior to this competition, the existing world and Olympic records were as follows:

World record	South Korea; Kim A-lang; Kim Dong-wook; Kim Ji-yoo; Kwak Yoon-gy	2:35.951	Beijing, China	24 October 2021
Olympic record	Not Established			

The following records were set during the competition:

Date	Round	Athletes	Country	Time	Record	Ref.
5 February	Heat 2	Suzanne Schulting; Xandra Velzeboer; Itzhak de Laat; Jens van 't Wout	Netherlands	OR	2:36.437	

== Results ==
=== Quarterfinals ===
Rank	Heat	Country	Athletes	Time	Notes
1	1	China	Qu Chunyu; Fan Kexin; Wu Dajing; Ren Ziwei	2:37.535	Q
2	1	Italy	Arianna Fontana; Arianna Valcepina; Yuri Confortola; Andrea Cassinelli	2:38.308	Q
3	1	South Korea	Choi Min-jeong; Lee Yu-bin; Hwang Dae-heon; Park Jang-hyuk	2:48.308	
4	1	Poland	Nikola Mazur; Kamila Stormowska; Michał Niewiński; Łukasz Kuczyński	2:50.513	
1	2	Netherlands	Suzanne Schulting; Xandra Velzeboer; Itzhak de Laat; Jens van 't Wout	2:36.437	Q, OR
2	2	Canada	Courtney Sarault; Florence Brunelle; Steven Dubois; Pascal Dion	2:36.747	Q
3	2	Kazakhstan	Yana Khan; Olga Tikhonova; Denis Nikisha; Abzal Azhgaliyev	2:43.004	q
4	2	France	Tifany Huot-Marchand; Gwendoline Daudet; Sébastien Lepape; Quentin Fercoq	2:51.221	
1	3	Hungary	Petra Jászapáti; Zsófia Kónya; Shaolin Sándor Liu; John-Henry Krueger	2:38.396	Q
2	3	ROC	Sofia Prosvirnova; Ekaterina Efremenkova; Semion Elistratov; Konstantin Ivliev	2:38.445	Q
3	3	United States	Kristen Santos; Maame Biney; Andrew Heo; Ryan Pivirotto	2:39.043	q
4	3	Japan	Yuki Kikuchi; Sumire Kikuchi; Kazuki Yoshinaga; Kota Kikuchi	2:39.112	

=== Semifinals ===
QA – qualified for Final A
QB – qualified for Final B
PEN – penalty

Rank	Heat	Country	Athletes	Time	Notes
1	1	Canada	Courtney Sarault; Kim Boutin; Jordan Pierre-Gilles; Pascal Dion	2:36.808	QA
2	1	Italy	Arianna Fontana; Martina Valcepina; Pietro Sighel; Andrea Cassinelli	2:36.895	QA
3	1	Kazakhstan	Yana Khan; Olga Tikhonova; Denis Nikisha; Abzal Azhgaliyev	2:42.575	QB
4	1	Netherlands	Suzanne Schulting; Selma Poutsma; Sjinkie Knegt; Jens van 't Wout	2:51.919	QB
1	2	Hungary	Petra Jászapáti; Zsófia Kónya; Shaoang Liu; Shaolin Sándor Liu	2:38.052	QA
2	2	China	Qu Chunyu; Zhang Yuting; Wu Dajing; Ren Ziwei	2:38.783	QA
	2	ROC	Sofia Prosvirnova; Elena Seregina; Semion Elistratov; Konstantin Ivliev		PEN
	2	United States	Kristen Santos; Corinne Stoddard; Andrew Heo; Ryan Pivirotto		PEN

=== Finals ===
==== Final B ====
Rank	Country	Athletes	Time	Notes
4	Netherlands	Suzanne Schulting; Selma Poutsma; Sjinkie Knegt; Jens van 't Wout	2:36.966	
5	Kazakhstan	Yana Khan; Olga Tikhonova; Adil Galiakhmetov; Denis Nikisha	2:44.148	

==== Final A ====
Rank	Country	Athletes	Time	Notes
1st place, gold medalist(s)	China	Qu Chunyu; Fan Kexin; Wu Dajing; Ren Ziwei	2:37.348	
2nd place, silver medalist(s)	Italy	Arianna Fontana; Martina Valcepina; Pietro Sighel; Andrea Cassinelli	2:37.364	
3rd place, bronze medalist(s)	Hungary	Petra Jászapáti; Zsófia Kónya; Shaoang Liu; Shaolin Sándor Liu	2:40.900	
	Canada	Florence Brunelle; Kim Boutin; Steven Dubois; Jordan Pierre-Gilles		PEN

==== Final ranking ====
Rank	Country	Athletes	QF	SF	FB	FA	Best Time
1st place, gold medalist(s)	China	Qu Chunyu; Fan Kexin; Zhang Yuting; Wu Dajing; Ren Ziwei	1	2		1	2:37.348
2nd place, silver medalist(s)	Italy	Arianna Fontana; Martina Valcepina; Arianna Valcepina; Pietro Sighel; Yuri Confortola; Andrea Cassinelli	2	2		2	2:36.895
3rd place, bronze medalist(s)	Hungary	Petra Jászapáti; Zsófia Kónya; Shaoang Liu; Shaolin Sándor Liu; John-Henry Krueger	1	1		3	2:38.052
4	Netherlands	Suzanne Schulting; Selma Poutsma; Xandra Velzeboer; Itzhak de Laat; Sjinkie Knegt; Jens van 't Wout	1	4	1		2:36.437
5	Kazakhstan	Yana Khan; Olga Tikhonova; Denis Nikisha; Abzal Azhgaliyev	3	3	2		2:42.575
6	Canada	Courtney Sarault; Florence Brunelle; Kim Boutin; Steven Dubois; Jordan Pierre-Gilles; Pascal Dion	2	1		PEN	2:36.747
7	ROC	Sofia Prosvirnova; Ekaterina Efremenkova; Elena Seregina; Semion Elistratov; Konstantin Ivliev	2	PEN			2:38.445
8	United States	Kristen Santos; Corinne Stoddard; Maame Biney; Andrew Heo; Ryan Pivirotto	3	PEN			2:39.043
9	South Korea	Choi Min-jeong; Lee Yu-bin; Hwang Dae-heon; Park Jang-hyuk	3				2:48.308
10	Japan	Yuki Kikuchi; Sumire Kikuchi; Kazuki Yoshinaga; Kota Kikuchi	4				2:39.112
11	Poland	Nikola Mazur; Kamila Stormowska; Michal Niewinski; Lukasz Kuczynski	4				2:50.513
12	France	Tifany Huot-Marchand; Gwendoline Daudet; Sébastien Lepape; Quentin Fercoq	4				2:51.221
