= Raffaele Buzzi =

Italian Nordic combined skier (born 1995)

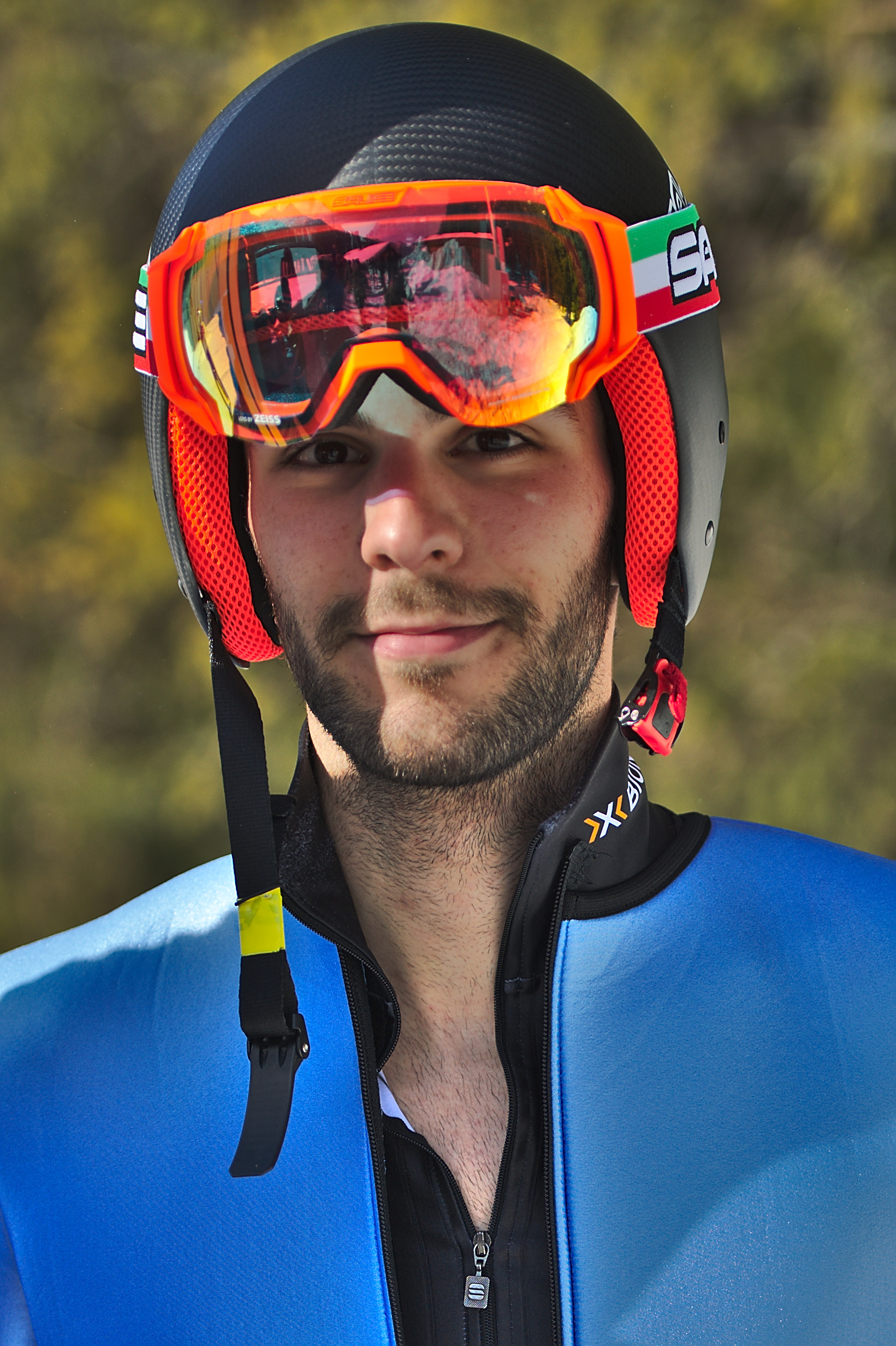
- Buzzi in 2017

Personal information
- Nationality: Italy
- Born: 17 July 1995 (age 31) Tolmezzo, Italy

Sport
- Sport: Skiing
- Club: C.S. CARABINIERI SEZ. SCI

World Cup career
- Seasons: 2016–2026
- Indiv. starts: 127

Raffaele Buzzi (born 17 July 1995) is an Italian former Nordic combined skier.

He competed at the 2018 Winter Olympics.
