= Iacopo Bortolas =

Italian Nordic combined skier (born 2003)

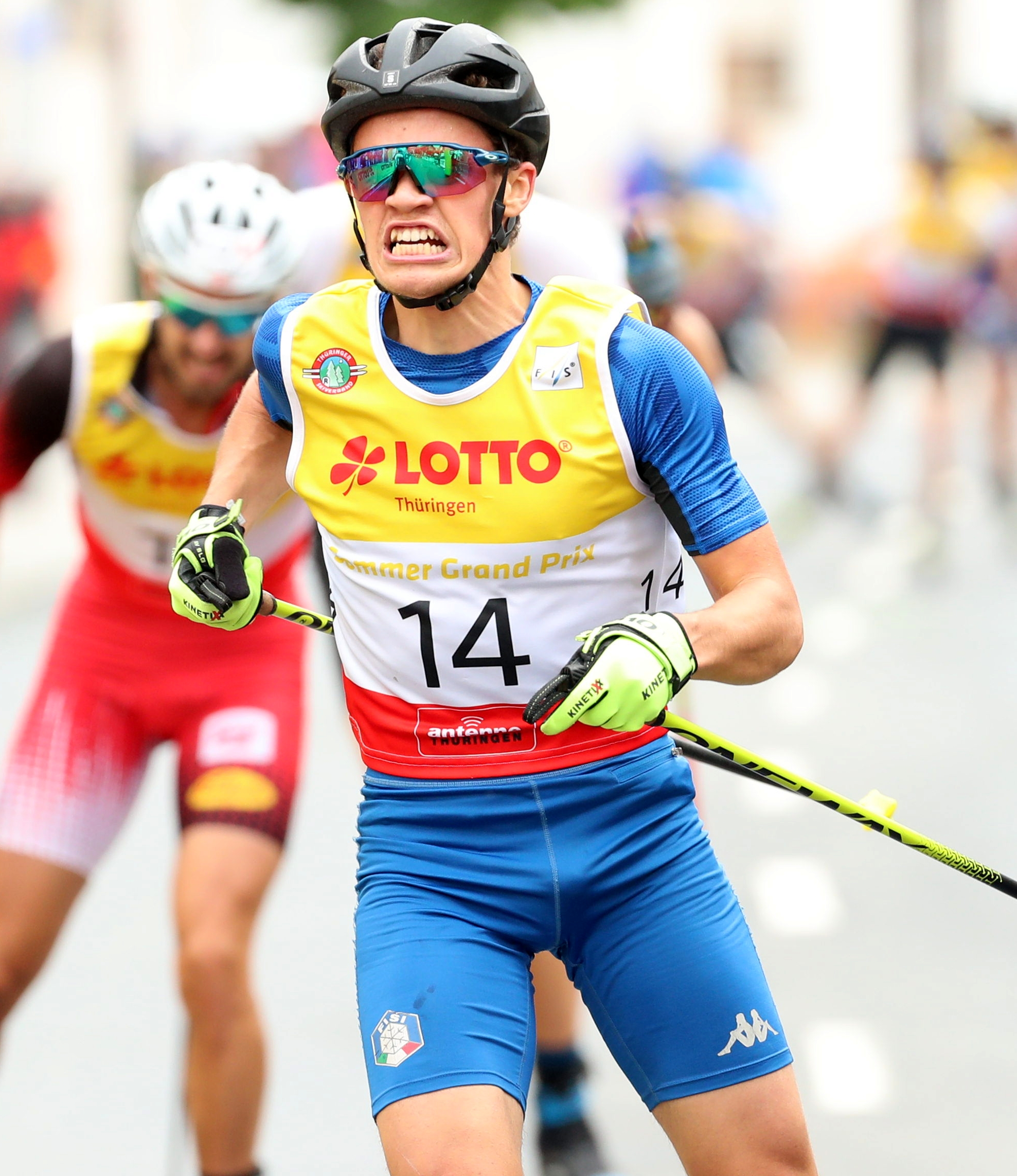
- Bortolas in 2021

Personal information
- Nationality: Italian
- Born: 7 June 2003 (age 23) Tesero, Italy

Sport
- Sport: Skiing
- Club: HSV Absam Bergisel-Tirol
Medal record
Men's Nordic combined
Representing Italy
World Junior Championships
Gold medal – first place	2023 Whistler	Individual NH
Silver medal – second place	2022 Zakopane	Mixed team NH
Bronze medal – third place	2021 Lahti	Mixed team NH
Bronze medal – third place	2023 Whistler	Mixed team NH

Iacopo Bortolas (born 7 June 2003) is an Italian Nordic combined skier who represented Italy at the 2022 Winter Olympics. He was the 2023 World Junior Champion in the Individual normal hill event.
