= Cynthia Mascitto =

Italian short track speed skater

Personal information
- Nationality: Italian
- Born: 4 October 1992 (age 33) Montreal, Quebec, Canada
- Height: 1.76 m (5 ft 9 in)
- Weight: 63 kg (139 lb)

Sport
- Country: Italy
- Sport: Short track speed skating
- Club: Skating Club Courmayeur
Medal record
World Championships
| Bronze medal – third place | 2021 Dordrecht | 3000 m relay |
European Championships
| Silver medal – second place | 2020 Debrecen | 3000 m relay |
| Bronze medal – third place | 2021 Gdańsk | 3000 m relay |

Cynthia Mascitto (born 4 October 1992) is an Italian short track speed skater. She competed in the 2018 Winter Olympics.
