= Maame Biney =

American short track speed skater

Personal information
- Born: January 28, 2000 (age 26) Accra, Ghana
- Home town: Reston, Virginia, U.S.
- Height: 5 ft 6 in (168 cm)

Sport
- Country: United States
- Sport: Short track speed skating
- Events: 500 m 1000 m 1500 m
- Turned pro: 2017
- Retired: 2024

Achievements and titles
- Olympic finals: 2018 Winter Olympics; 2022 Winter Olympics

Maame Biney (born January 28, 2000) is a former American short track speed skater who competed in the 2018 Winter Olympics in PyeongChang.

== Early life ==
Biney was born in Accra, Ghana. At age five, she relocated to the United States to live with her father. Biney began skating when she was six years old in Northern Virginia, where she began figure skating. She later switched to speed skating on a coach's recommendation.

== Career ==
Biney won the bronze medal in the 500-meters at the 2017 World Junior Short Track Speed Skating Championships. She made her senior team debut later that year winning the America's Cup at the U.S Speedskating Short Track World Cup Qualifier. On December 16, 2017, Biney qualified for the 2018 Olympics by winning the 500-meters at the U.S. Olympic Trials, becoming the second African-born athlete to represent the U.S. at the Winter Olympics, after Madagascar-born biathlete Dan Westover in 1998.

In the 2018 Olympics, Biney did not make it past her qualifying heat in the 1500-meters and was ousted from the 500-meter race in the quarterfinals.

Coming back from the 2018 Olympics, Biney did well at the 2018 World Junior Short Track Speed Skating Championships, winning gold in the 500-meters, bronze in the 1000-meters, and bronze overall.

Biney qualified for the 2022 Winter Olympics at the 2022 US Olympic Team Trials - Short Track Speedskating.

On October 18, 2024, Biney announced her retirement on social media.
