= Qu Chunyu =

Chinese speed skater (born 1996)

Personal information
- Born: 20 July 1996 (age 30) Heihe, Heilongjiang, China
- Height: 173 cm (5 ft 8 in)

Sport
- Country: China
- Sport: Short-track speed skating
Medal record
Women's short-track speed skating
Representing China
Olympic Games
Gold medal – first place	2022 Beijing	2000 m mixed relay
Bronze medal – third place	2022 Beijing	3000 m relay
World Championships
Gold medal – first place	2017 Rotterdam	3000 m relay
Bronze medal – third place	2016 Seoul	500 m
Bronze medal – third place	2018 Montreal	500 m
Asian Games
Silver medal – second place	2017 Sapporo	3000 m relay
Representing Mixed-NOCs
Youth Olympic Games
Bronze medal – third place	2012 Innsbruck	Mixed team relay

Qu Chunyu (Chinese: 曲春雨; pinyin: Qū Chūnyǔ; Mandarin pronunciation: [tɕʰý ʈʂʰwə́n ỳ]; born 20 July 1996) is a Chinese short track speed skater. She competed in the women's 500 metres at the 2018 Winter Olympics. and at the 2022 Winter Olympics, in 2000 metre mixed relay winning a gold medal, and Women's 3000 metre relay, winning a bronze medal.
