= Zhang Yuting =

Chinese short track speed skater

Personal information
- Nationality: Chinese
- Born: 4 August 1999 (age 26) Harbin, China
- Height: 185 cm (6 ft 1 in)

Sport
- Sport: Short track speed skating
Medal record
Women's short-track speed skating
Representing China
Olympic Games
Gold medal – first place	2022 Beijing	Mixed 2000 m relay
Bronze medal – third place	2022 Beijing	3000 m relay

Zhang Yuting (born 4 August 1999) is a Chinese short track speed skater. She won a gold medal at the 2022 Winter Olympics in the mixed team relay.
