= Zsófia Kónya =

Hungarian short track speed skater

Personal information
- Full name: Zsófia Lilla Kónya
- Nationality: Hungarian
- Born: 6 February 1995 (age 31) Szeged, Hungary
- Height: 158 cm (5 ft 2 in)
- Weight: 56 kg (123 lb)

Sport
- Country: Hungary
- Sport: Short track speed skating
- Club: Szegedi Korcsolyázó Egyesület
Medal record
Women's short-track speed skating
Representing Hungary
Olympic Games
Bronze medal – third place	2022 Beijing	2000 m mixed relay
European Championships
Silver medal – second place	2017 Turin	3000 m relay
Silver medal – second place	2018 Dresden	3000 m relay
Silver medal – second place	2023 Gdańsk	3000 m relay
Silver medal – second place	2025 Dresden	3000 m relay
Bronze medal – third place	2014 Dresden	3000 m relay

Zsófia Lilla Kónya (born 6 February 1995) is a Hungarian short track speed skater, member of the national team. She was 3rd place on the European Championships in 2014 and 3rd placed in the Winter Universiade in 2013. She competed in the 2014, 2018 and 2022 Winter Olympic Games, representing Hungary.

== Personal life ==
She was born in Szeged, Hungary. She lived in the city until she was 16. She began skating sports at the age of 7. She took up short track speed skating at the age of 8. She decided to compete in short track because of the possibility of participating at the Olympic Games. In 2011 she moved to Budapest because of the better training facilities. Meanwhile, she also switched clubs; she became the skater of Sportország SC. By this time, she was already a member of the national team.

== Sports career ==
She won Hungarian Junior Championships 6 times. She also celebrated winning the European Junior Cup twice, finishing second twice at the competition.

She finished on the podium in 2009 at the Hungarian Championships for the first time. She achieved two bronzes at this event in 1500 and in 3000 meters. In 2011 she finished third overall while winning a gold medal with the relay team.

Her best result at the Junior World Championships is 8th place. In Melbourne (2012), she took this position in the 500 meters. One year later, in Warsaw, she achieved the 8th position in 1500 meters, while she took 11th place overall. Since season 2011/12, she has been competing at the World Cup events. Her best position until now is 15th place in Nagoya (2012).

2013 was a big success thanks to the relay bronze gained in the Winter Universiade in Trentino, Italy. She also achieved the 8th position on 1000 meters.

The year's main events were the two qualification World Cups for the Olympic Games. She was able to win a quota for her country in 1500 meters. She also helped the women's relay team to qualify for Sochi according to the results of the World Cups held in Turin, Italy and in Kolomna, Russia.

Her best result so far is the two bronze medals gained at the European Championships (Dresden, 2014): individual in 1500 m. and a team relay race on 3000 meters. In the overall classification, she took 6th place.

== Best times ==
Distance	Time	Date	Place	Event
222m	25.958	17 December 2005	Spišská Nová Ves (Slovakia)	Slovak Open
333m	38.205	17 December 2005	Spišská Nová Ves (Slovakia)	Slovak Open
500m	44.144	28 October 2023	Montreal (Canada)	ISU World Cup 2
777m	1:12.389	28 September 2019	Budapest (Hungary)	National Championships Hungary
1000m	1:28.859	26 October 2024	Montreal (Canada)	ISU World Tour 1
1500m	2:23.080	20 September 2025	Heerenveen (Netherlands)	Dutch Open Shorttrack National Championships
3000m	5:32.880	30 December 2011	Budapest (Hungary)	National Championships Hungary

== Results ==
Event	Position					
Event	Overall	500m	1000m	1500m	3000m	3000m relay
Hungarian Championships, Budapest, 2008	10th	9th	12th	11th	–	
Hungarian Championships, Budapest, 2009	4th	Bronze medal	5th	4th	Bronze medal	
World Junior Championship, Taipei (TPE), 2010	34th	21st	33rd	43rd	7th	
Hungarian Championships, Budapest, 2011	Bronze medal	Bronze medal	Bronze medal	5th	4th	Gold medal
World Cup, Salt Lake City (USA), 2011			25th	25th		9th
World Cup, Saguenay (CAN), 2011		20th	26th			
World Junior Championships, Courmayeur (ITA), 2011	19th	30th	16th	11th	-	6th
World Cup, Moscow (RUS), 2012			23rd	24th		
Hungarian Championships, Budapest, 2012	4th	4th	4th	4th		
World Junior Championships, Melbourne (AUS), 2012	33rd	8th	DQ	DQ	-	
World Cup, Calgary (CAN), 2012			27th	23rd		6th
World Cup, Montreal (CAN), 2012		28th		26th		11th
World Cup, Nagoya (JPN), 2012			15th	28th		8th
World Cup, Shanghai (CHI), 2012			18th	22nd		6th
European Championships, Malmö (SWE), 2013	26th	33rd	27th	14th	-	4th
World Championships, Debrecen (HUN), 2013					-	8th
World Junior Championships, Warsaw (POL), 2013	11th	13th	14th	8th	-	
World Cup, Shanghai (CHI), 2013		25th		23rd		10th
World Cup, Seoul (KOR), 2013		27th		28th		7th
World Cup, Turin (ITA), 2013 - Olympics qualification		30th		16th		DQ
World Cup, Kolomna (RUS), 2013 - Olympics qualification		33rd	47th	21st		6th
Winter Universiade, Trentino (ITA), 2013			8th	19th		Bronze medal
European Championships, Dresden (GER), 2014	6th	12th	9th	Bronze medal	7th	Bronze medal
