= Andrea Cassinelli =

Italian speed skater (born 1993)

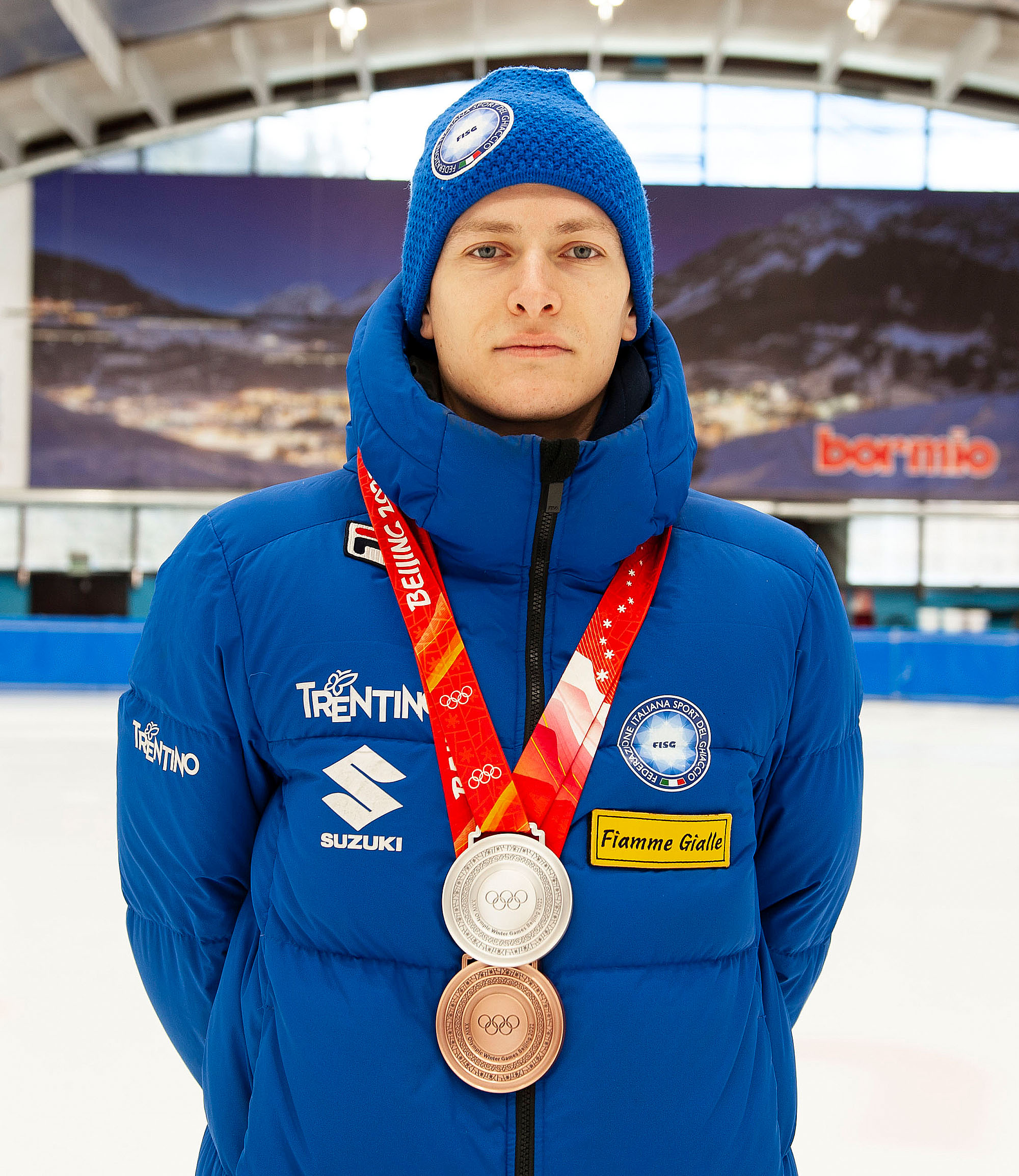
- Cassinelli in 2022

Personal information
- Born: 2 September 1993 (age 32) Moncalieri, Italy
- Height: 1.85 m (6 ft 1 in)
- Weight: 80 kg (176 lb)

Sport
- Country: Italy
- Sport: Short track speed skating
- Club: G.S. Fiamme Gialle
Medal record
Men's short-track speed skating
Representing Italy
Olympic Games
Silver medal – second place	2022 Beijing	Mixed 2000 m relay
Bronze medal – third place	2022 Beijing	5000 m relay
Bronze medal – third place	2026 Milano Cortina	5000 m relay
World Championships
Silver medal – second place	2023 Seoul	5000 m relay
Silver medal – second place	2024 Rotterdam	2000 m mixed relay
Bronze medal – third place	2023 Seoul	2000 m mixed relay
European Championships
Gold medal – first place	2026 Tilburg	5000 m relay
Silver medal – second place	2021 Gdańsk	5000 m relay
Bronze medal – third place	2017 Turin	5000 m relay
Bronze medal – third place	2020 Debrecen	5000 m relay

Andrea Cassinelli (born 2 September 1993) is an Italian short-track speed skater. A relay specialist, he won three medals at the Winter Olympic Games.

== Biography ==
Born in Moncalieri and competing for the Gruppo Sportivo Fiamme Gialle, Cassinelli won his first international medal at the 2017 European Championships in Turin, a bronze in the 5000 m relay, followed by another bronze in 2020 and a silver in 2021.

At the 2022 Winter Olympics he won the bronze medal in the 5000 m relay and the silver medal in the mixed team relay.

After claiming three World Championships medals in 2023 and 2024 and the gold medal in the 5000 m relay at the 2026 European Championships, Cassinelli competed in the 2026 Winter Olympics, earning another bronze medal in the 5000 m relay. Shortly after, he announced his retirement.
