= Lee Yu-bin =

South Korean short track speedskater

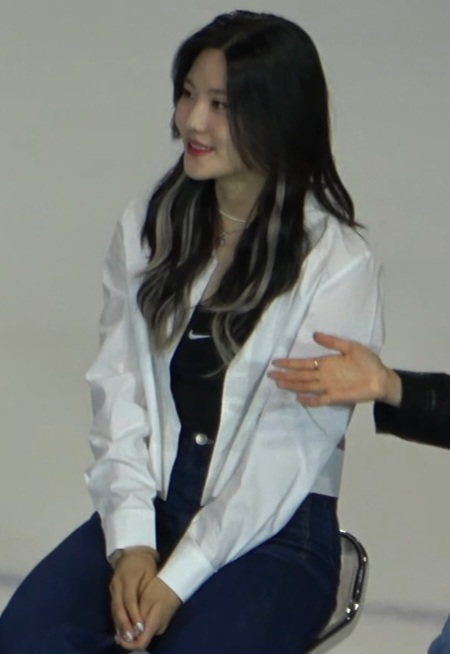

Personal information
- Nationality: South Korean
- Born: 23 April 2001 (age 25) Bucheon, South Korea
- Height: 1.62 m (5 ft 4 in)
- Weight: 53 kg (117 lb)

Sport
- Country: South Korea
- Sport: Short track speed skating
Medal record
Women's short track speed skating
Representing South Korea
Olympic Games
Gold medal – first place	2018 Pyeongchang	3000 m relay
Silver medal – second place	2022 Beijing	3000 m relay
World Championships
Gold medal – first place	2018 Montreal	3000 m relay

- Lee Yu-bin
- Hangul: 이유빈
- RR: I Yubin
- MR: I Yubin

Lee Yu-bin (Korean: 이유빈; born 23 April 2001) is a South Korean short track speed skater. She competed in the 2018 Winter Olympics and 2022 Winter Olympics in the Women's 1500 metres and Women's 3000 metre relay winning a silver medal.
