= Arianna Valcepina =

Italian short track speed skater

Personal information
- Nationality: Italian
- Born: 9 May 1994 (age 32) Sondalo, Italy

Sport
- Country: Italy
- Sport: Short track speed skating
- Club: CS Fiamme Gialle
Medal record
Women's short-track speed skating
Representing Italy
Olympic Games
Silver medal – second place	2022 Beijing	Mixed 2000 m relay
World Championships
Bronze medal – third place	2015 Moscow	3000 m relay
Bronze medal – third place	2021 Dordrecht	3000 m relay
Bronze medal – third place	2023 Seoul	2000 m mixed relay
European Championships
Gold medal – first place	2017 Turin	3000 m relay
Silver medal – second place	2012 Mladá Boleslav	3000 m relay
Bronze medal – third place	2016 Sochi	3000 m relay
Bronze medal – third place	2023 Gdańsk	500 m
Bronze medal – third place	2023 Gdańsk	3000 m relay
Bronze medal – third place	2023 Gdańsk	2000 m mixed relay

Arianna Valcepina (born 9 May 1994) is an Italian short track speed skater. She won a silver medal at the 2022 Winter Olympics in the mixed team relay.
