= World and Olympic records set at the 2022 Winter Olympics =

There were 2 world records (WR) and 21 Olympic records (OR) that were set in various skating events at the 2022 Winter Olympics in Beijing, China.

== Figure skating ==
The following new ISU best scores and Olympic records were set during this competition:

| Event | Date | Component | Skater(s) | Country | Score | Ref |
|---|---|---|---|---|---|---|
| Team event | 4 February | Pairs – Short program | Sui Wenjing / Han Cong | China | 82.83 | |
| Team event | 4 February | Women – Short program | Kamila Valieva | ROC | 90.18 OR | |
| Team event | 4 February | Women – Free skating | Kamila Valieva | ROC | 178.92 OR | |
| Men's singles | 8 February | Short program | Nathan Chen | United States | 113.97 | |
| Men's singles | 8 February | Short program TES | Nathan Chen | United States | 65.98 | |
| Men's singles | 10 February | Free skating PCS | Nathan Chen | United States | 97.22 | |
| Ice dance | 12 February | Rhythm dance | Gabriella Papadakis / Guillaume Cizeron | France | 90.83 | |
| Ice dance | 12 February | Rhythm dance TES | Gabriella Papadakis / Guillaume Cizeron | France | 51.65 | |
| Ice dance | 14 February | Combined total | Gabriella Papadakis / Guillaume Cizeron | France | 226.98 | |
| Women's singles | 17 February | Free skating | Alexandra Trusova | ROC | 177.13 OR | |
| Women's singles | 17 February | Free skating TES | Alexandra Trusova | ROC | 106.16 OR | |
| Pair skating | 18 February | Short program | Sui Wenjing / Han Cong | China | 82.83 | |
| Pair skating | 19 February | Combined total | Sui Wenjing / Han Cong | China | 239.82 | |

TES = Technical Element Score
PCS = Program Component Score

== Short track speed skating ==
| Event | Date | Round | Athlete | Country | Time | Record | Ref |
|---|---|---|---|---|---|---|---|
| Women's 500 metres | 5 February | Heat 4 | Suzanne Schulting | Netherlands | 42.379 | OR | |
| Men's 1000 metres | 5 February | Heat 5 | Hwang Dae-heon | South Korea | 1:23.042 | OR | |
| Mixed 2000 metre relay | 5 February | Heat 2 | Suzanne Schulting; Xandra Velzeboer; Itzhak de Laat; Jens van 't Wout | Netherlands | 2:36.437 | OR | |
| Women's 1000 metres | 9 February | Heat 2 | Suzanne Schulting | Netherlands | 1:27.292 | OR | |
| Men's 1500 metres | 9 February | Quarterfinal 1 | Shaolin Sándor Liu | Hungary | 2:09.213 | OR | |
| Women's 1000 metres | 11 February | Quarterfinal 1 | Suzanne Schulting | Netherlands | 1:26.514 | WR, OR | |
| Women's 3000 metre relay | 13 February | Final A | Suzanne Schulting; Selma Poutsma; Xandra Velzeboer; Yara van Kerkhof | Netherlands | 4:03.409 | OR | |
| Women's 1500 metres | 16 February | Semifinal 3 | Choi Min-jeong | South Korea | 2:16.831 | OR | |

== Speed skating ==
| Event | Date | Round | Athlete | Country | Time | Record | Ref |
|---|---|---|---|---|---|---|---|
| Women's 3000 metres | 5 February | Pair 10 | Irene Schouten | Netherlands | 3:56.93 | OR | |
| Men's 5000 metres | 6 February | Pair 5 | Patrick Roest | Netherlands | 6:09.31 | OR | |
| Men's 5000 metres | 6 February | Pair 10 | Nils van der Poel | Sweden | 6:08.84 | OR | |
| Women's 1500 metres | 7 February | Pair 12 | Ireen Wüst | Netherlands | 1:53.28 | OR | |
| Men's 1500 metres | 8 February | Pair 10 | Thomas Krol | Netherlands | 1:43.55 | OR | |
| Men's 1500 metres | 8 February | Pair 11 | Kjeld Nuis | Netherlands | 1:43.21 | OR | |
| Women's 5000 metres | 10 February | Pair 6 | Irene Schouten | Netherlands | 6:43.51 | OR | |
| Men's 10,000 metres | 11 February | Pair 5 | Nils van der Poel | Sweden | 12:30.74 | WR, OR | |
| Men's 500 metres | 12 February | Pair 7 | Gao Tingyu | China | 34.32 | OR | |
| Women's team pursuit | 12 February | Quarterfinal 1 | Ayano Sato; Miho Takagi; Nana Takagi | Japan | 2:53.61 | OR | |
| Men's team pursuit | 15 February | Semifinal 2 | Daniil Aldoshkin; Sergey Trofimov; Ruslan Zakharov | ROC | 3:36.62 | OR | |
| Women's team pursuit | 15 February | Final A | Ivanie Blondin; Valérie Maltais; Isabelle Weidemann | Canada | 2:53.44 | OR | |
| Women's 1000 metres | 17 February | Pair 13 | Miho Takagi | Japan | 1:13.19 | OR | |
