= Speed skating at the 2022 Winter Olympics – Men's 1000 metres =

Speed skating event at the 2022 Winter Olympics

Men's 1000 metres at the XXIV Olympic Winter Games
- Venue: National Speed Skating Oval, Beijing
- Date: 18 February 2022
- Competitors: 30 from 16 nations
- Winning time: 1:07.92

Medalists
1st place, gold medalist(s)		Thomas Krol; Netherlands
2nd place, silver medalist(s)		Laurent Dubreuil; Canada
3rd place, bronze medalist(s)		Håvard Holmefjord Lorentzen; Norway

The men's 1000 m competition in speed skating at the 2022 Winter Olympics will be held on 18 February, at the National Speed Skating Oval ("Ice Ribbon") in Beijing. Thomas Krol of the Netherlands won the event, it was his first Olympic gold medal. Laurent Dubreuil of Canada won the silver medal, his first Olympic medal. Håvard Holmefjord Lorentzen of Norway won bronze.

The reigning champion, Kjeld Nuis, qualified for the Olympics, but will not be able to defend his title as he did not qualify for this distance. The 2018 silver medalist, Håvard Holmefjord Lorentzen, qualified, as did the bronze medalist, Kim Tae-yun. Kai Verbij is the 2021 World Single Distances champion at the 1000m distance. The silver medalist and the world record holder was Pavel Kulizhnikov. Thomas Krol was leading the 2021–22 ISU Speed Skating World Cup at the 1000m distance with four races completed before the Olympics, followed by Nuis and Holmefjord Lorentzen. Krol skated the season best time, 1:06.44 in Salt Lake City on 5 December 2021.

Piotr Michalski in pair 4 was the first skater out of 1:09 and took an early lead. Only in pair 13 Krol and Holmefjord Lorentzen both improved his time. Krol became the first skater to go below 1:08, with two pairs to go. The winner of pair 14, Ning Zhongyan, had the time just 0.04 worse than Michalski's. In the last pair, Laurent Dubreuil had the second overall time, shifting Michalski off the podium.

== Qualification ==
A total of 30 entry quotas were available for the event, with a maximum of three athletes per NOC. The first 20 athletes qualified through their performance at the 2021–22 ISU Speed Skating World Cup, while the last ten earned quotas by having the best times among athletes not already qualified. A country could only earn the maximum three spots through the World Cup rankings.

The qualification time for the event (1:10.50) was released on July 1, 2021, and was unchanged from 2018. Skaters had the time period of July 1, 2021 – January 16, 2022 to achieve qualification times at valid International Skating Union (ISU) events.

== Records ==
Prior to this competition, the existing world, Olympic and track records were as follows.

World record	Pavel Kulizhnikov (RUS)	1:05.69	Salt Lake City, United States	15 February 2020
Olympic record	Gerard van Velde (NED)	1:07.18	Salt Lake City, United States	16 February 2002
Track record	Xu Fu (CHN)	1:11.40		8 April 2021

== Results ==
The races were started at 16:30.

Rank	Pair	Lane	Name	Country	Time	Time behind	Notes
1st place, gold medalist(s)	13	I	Thomas Krol	Netherlands	1:07.92	—	TR
2nd place, silver medalist(s)	15	I	Laurent Dubreuil	Canada	1:08.32	+0.40	
3rd place, bronze medalist(s)	13	O	Håvard Holmefjord Lorentzen	Norway	1:08.48	+0.56	
4	4	I	Piotr Michalski	Poland	1:08.56	+0.64	
5	14	I	Ning Zhongyan	China	1:08.60	+0.68	
6	12	I	Ignat Golovatsiuk	Belarus	1:08.64	+0.71	
7	11	I	Marten Liiv	Estonia	1:08.65	+0.73	
8	12	O	Viktor Mushtakov	ROC	1:08.74	+0.82	
9	10	O	Cornelius Kersten	Great Britain	1:08.79	+0.87	
10	14	O	Hein Otterspeer	Netherlands	1:08.80	+0.88	
11	6	I	Pavel Kulizhnikov	ROC	1:08.87	+0.95	
12	11	O	Connor Howe	Canada	1:08.97	+1.05	
13	1	O	Damian Żurek	Poland	1:09.08	+1.16	
14	7	I	Jordan Stolz	United States	1:09.12	+1.20	
15	5	I	David Bosa	Italy	1:09.35	+1.43	
16	3	I	Wataru Morishige	Japan	1:09.47	+1.55	
17	2	I	Dmitriy Morozov	Kazakhstan	1:09.61	+1.69	
18	10	I	Cha Min-kyu	South Korea	1:09.69	+1.77	
19	4	O	Lian Ziwen	China	1:09.93	+2.01	
20	9	I	Ryota Kojima	Japan	1:09.97	+2.05	
21	1	I	Tatsuya Shinhama	Japan	1:10.00	+2.08	
22	8	I	Antoine Gélinas-Beaulieu	Canada	1:10.075	+2.15	
23	5	O	Denis Kuzin	Kazakhstan	1:10.077	+2.15	
24	7	O	Kim Min-seok	South Korea	1:10.08	+2.16	
25	3	O	Bjørn Magnussen	Norway	1:10.14	+2.22	
26	8	O	Joel Dufter	Germany	1:10.16	+2.24	
27	6	O	Mathias Vosté	Belgium	1:10.22	+2.30	
28	9	O	Allan Dahl Johansson	Norway	1:10.34	+2.42	
29	2	O	Austin Kleba	United States	1:10.67	+2.65	
30	15	O	Kai Verbij	Netherlands	1:14.17	+6.25	
