= Poland at the 2022 Winter Olympics =

- Flag of Poland
- IOC code: POL
- NOC: Polish Olympic Committee
- Website: www.olimpijski.pl (in Polish)

in Beijing, China 4–20 February 2022
- Competitors: 57 (27 men and 30 women) in 10 sports
- Flag bearers (opening): Aleksandra Król; Zbigniew Bródka
- Flag bearer (closing): Piotr Michalski
- Medals Ranked 27th: Gold 0 Silver 0 Bronze 1 Total 1

Winter Olympics appearances (overview)
- 1924; 1928; 1932; 1936; 1948; 1952; 1956; 1960; 1964; 1968; 1972; 1976; 1980; 1984; 1988; 1992; 1994; 1998; 2002; 2006; 2010; 2014; 2018; 2022; 2026

Poland competed at the 2022 Winter Olympics in Beijing, China, from 4 to 20 February 2022.

On January 25, 2022, long track speed skaters Zbigniew Bródka and Natalia Czerwonka were named as the Polish flagbearers during the opening ceremony. On February 2, 2022, snowboarder Aleksandra Król replaced Czerwonka, who tested positive for COVID-19 at the arrival. Meanwhile Piotr Michalski was the flagbearer during the closing ceremony.

== Medalists ==
The following Polish competitors won medals at the games. In the discipline sections below, the medalists' names are bolded.

Medal	Name	Sport	Event	Date
Bronze	Dawid Kubacki	Ski jumping	Men's normal hill individual	6 February

== Competitors ==
The following is the list of number of competitors participating at the Games per sport.

Sport	Men	Women	Total
Alpine skiing	2	4	6
Biathlon	1	4	5
Cross-country skiing	4	5	9
Figure skating	1	2	3
Luge	3	1	4
Nordic combined	2	—N/a	2
Short track speed skating	2	4	6
Ski jumping	5	2	7
Snowboarding	2	3	5
Speed skating	5	5	10
Total	27	30	57

== Alpine skiing ==
Poland qualified one male and three female alpine skiers. They also received an additional male quota to compete in the team event and claimed one more female quota during reallocation.

Men

Athlete	Event	Run 1		Run 2		Total	
Athlete	Event	Time	Rank	Time	Rank	Time	Rank
Michał Jasiczek	Giant slalom	DNF		Did not advance			
Michał Jasiczek	Slalom	57.40	30	DSQ			
Paweł Pyjas	Giant slalom	DNF		Did not advance			
Paweł Pyjas	Slalom	DNF		Did not advance			

Women

Athlete	Event	Run 1		Run 2		Total	
Athlete	Event	Time	Rank	Time	Rank	Time	Rank
Zuzanna Czapska	Giant slalom	1:03.63	37	1:01.52	29	2:05.15	30
Maryna Gąsienica-Daniel	Giant slalom	59.24	11	57.87	4	1:57.11	8
Magdalena Łuczak	Giant slalom	1:01.96	32	1:00.89	26	2:02.85	26
Hanna Zięba	Giant slalom	DNS		Did not advance			
Zuzanna Czapska	Slalom	DNF		Did not advance			
Magdalena Łuczak	Slalom	DNF		Did not advance			
Maryna Gąsienica-Daniel	Super-G	—N/a				1:15.81	26

Mixed

Athlete	Event	Round of 16	Quarterfinal	Semifinal	Final / BM	
Athlete	Event	Opposition Result	Opposition Result	Opposition Result	Opposition Result	Rank
Maryna Gąsienica-Daniel; Michał Jasiczek; Magdalena Łuczak; Paweł Pyjas	Team	Norway; **L** 2–2 (+0.96)	Did not advance			10

== Biathlon ==
Based on their Nations Cup ranking in the 2020–21 and 2020–21 Biathlon World Cup, Poland has qualified 4 women and 1 man.

Men

Athlete	Event	Time	Misses	Rank
Grzegorz Guzik	Individual	54:47.9	3 (0+1+1+1)	49
Grzegorz Guzik	Sprint	26:36.2	1 (0+1)	48
Grzegorz Guzik	Pursuit	47:07.0	8 (2+3+1+2)	54

Women

Athlete	Event	Time	Misses	Rank
Monika Hojnisz-Staręga	Individual	46:55.3	2 (0+0+1+1)	20
Monika Hojnisz-Staręga	Sprint	22:12.9	1 (1+0)	16
Monika Hojnisz-Staręga	Pursuit	37:15.7	2 (2+0+0+0)	9
Monika Hojnisz-Staręga	Mass start	44:06.6	8 (2+3+1+2)	27
Anna Mąka	Individual	58:18.3	9 (2+2+2+3)	85
Anna Mąka	Sprint	23:55.4	3 (1+2)	66
Kinga Zbylut	Individual	50:54.7	3 (0+1+1+1)	55
Kinga Zbylut	Sprint	24:05.1	2 (1+1)	69
Kamila Żuk	Individual	49:02.7	3 (0+2+1+0)	36
Kamila Żuk	Sprint	23:22.9	1 (1+0)	53
Kamila Żuk	Pursuit	DNS		
Monika Hojnisz-Staręga; Anna Mąka; Kinga Zbylut; Kamila Żuk	Team relay	1:17:12.1	11 (1+10)	14

== Cross-country skiing ==
Poland has qualified four male and five female cross-country skiers.

Men

Athlete	Event	Classical		Freestyle		Final		
Athlete	Event	Time	Rank	Time	Rank	Time	Deficit	Rank
Dominik Bury	15 km classical	—N/a				40:48.4	+2:53.6	27
Dominik Bury	30 km skiathlon	42:08.2	35	39:57.9	26	1:22:40.6	+6:30.8	26
Dominik Bury	50 km freestyle	—N/a				1:16:01.0	+4:28.3	30
Mateusz Haratyk	15 km classical	—N/a				43:00.3	+5:05.5	60
Mateusz Haratyk	30 km skiathlon	45:40.0	59	LAP				51
Mateusz Haratyk	50 km freestyle	—N/a				1:20:24.0	+8:51.3	50

Women

Athlete	Event	Classical		Freestyle		Final		
Athlete	Event	Time	Rank	Time	Rank	Time	Deficit	Rank
Magdalena Kobielusz	10 km classical	—N/a				35:40.3	+7:34.0	78
Magdalena Kobielusz	15 km skiathlon	27:32.7	59	25:45.8	59	54:12.0	+9:58.3	59
Magdalena Kobielusz	30 km freestyle	—N/a				1:44:48.8	+19:54.8	57
Karolina Kukuczka	10 km classical	—N/a				33:16.6	+5:10.3	64
Izabela Marcisz	10 km classical	—N/a				30:54.6	+2:48.3	29
Izabela Marcisz	15 km skiathlon	24:01.6	17	22:52.8	18	47:30.7	+3:17.0	16
Izabela Marcisz	30 km freestyle	—N/a				1:31:43.0	+6:49.0	21
Monika Skinder	10 km classical	—N/a				31:49.9	+3:43.6	49
Weronika Kaleta; Karolina Kukuczka; Izabela Marcisz; Monika Skinder	4×5 km relay	—N/a				1:00:21.5	+6:40.5	14

Sprint

Athlete	Event	Qualification		Quarterfinal		Semifinal		Final	
Athlete	Event	Time	Rank	Time	Rank	Time	Rank	Time	Rank
Kamil Bury	Men's sprint	3:02.73	58	Did not advance					
Maciej Staręga	Men's sprint	2:53.61	26 **Q**	2:58.56	4	Did not advance			19
Kamil Bury; Maciej Staręga	Men's team sprint	—N/a				20:19.87	8	Did not advance	15
Weronika Kaleta	Women's sprint	3:32.28	50	Did not advance					
Izabela Marcisz	Women's sprint	3:25.62	39	Did not advance					
Monika Skinder	Women's sprint	3:27.93	42	Did not advance					
Izabela Marcisz; Monika Skinder	Women's team sprint	—N/a				23:32.34	6 **q**	23:48.01	9

== Figure skating ==
In the 2021 World Figure Skating Championships in Stockholm, Sweden, Poland secured one quota in the ice dance competition. At the 2021 CS Nebelhorn Trophy, Poland secured one quota in women's singles.

Athlete	Event	SP/SD		FP/FD		Total	
Athlete	Event	Points	Rank	Points	Rank	Points	Rank
Ekaterina Kurakova	Women's singles	59.08	24 **Q**	126.76	12	185.84	12
Natalia Kaliszek; Maksym Spodyriev	Ice dance	70.32	15 **Q**	96.99	20	167.31	17

== Luge ==
Based on the results from the fall World Cups during the 2021–22 Luge World Cup season, Poland earned the following start quotas:

Athlete	Event	Run 1		Run 2		Run 3		Run 4		Total	
Athlete	Event	Time	Rank	Time	Rank	Time	Rank	Time	Rank	Time	Rank
Mateusz Sochowicz	Men's singles	58.863	24	59.196	26	58.867	24	Did not advance		2:56.926	25
Wojciech Chmielewski; Jakub Kowalewski	Men's doubles	58.992	8	59.073	9	—N/a				1:58.065	9
Klaudia Domaradzka	Women's singles	59.871	25	59.892	25	1:01.313	31	Did not advance		3:01.076	27

Mixed team relay

Athlete	Event	Run 1		Run 2		Run 3		Total	
Athlete	Event	Time	Rank	Time	Rank	Time	Rank	Time	Rank
Klaudia Domaradzka; Mateusz Sochowicz; Wojciech Chmielewski; Jakub Kowalewski	Team relay	1:01.448	10	1:02.727	9	1:02.961	7	3:07.136	8

== Nordic combined ==
Two athletes from Poland qualified.

Athlete	Event	Ski jumping			Cross-country		Total	
Athlete	Event	Distance	Points	Rank	Time	Rank	Time	Rank
Szczepan Kupczak	Normal hill/10 km	89.5	87.5	32	27:22.3	37	30:24.3	34
Szczepan Kupczak	Large hill/10 km	121.5	86.3	30	28:25.8	42	31:59.8	35
Andrzej Szczechowicz	Normal hill/10 km	82.5	76.4	37	26:40.2	33	30:26.2	35
Andrzej Szczechowicz	Large hill/10 km	93.0	44.6	45	29:27.5	44	35:48.5	45

== Short track speed skating ==
Poland has qualified four skaters for women's 500 m, 1000 m and 1500 m events and relay for the Olympics. They have also qualified a men's quota for the 1500 m and an additional men's quota to compete in the mixed relay.

Men

Athlete	Event	Heat		Quarterfinal		Semifinal		Final	
Athlete	Event	Time	Rank	Time	Rank	Time	Rank	Time	Rank
Michał Niewiński	1500 m	—N/a		2:12.852	6	Did not advance			31

Women

Athlete	Event	Heat		Quarterfinal		Semifinal		Final	
Athlete	Event	Time	Rank	Time	Rank	Time	Rank	Time	Rank
Patrycja Maliszewska	500 m	44.130	3	Did not advance					22
Nikola Mazur	500 m	43.732	4	Did not advance					27
Kamila Stormowska	500 m	44.053	4	Did not advance					28
Natalia Maliszewska	1000 m	1:29.610	1 **Q**	1:48.908	5	Did not advance			17
Kamila Stormowska	1000 m	1:28.567	4	Did not advance					26
Natalia Maliszewska	1500 m	—N/a		2:25.850	5	Did not advance			29
Kamila Stormowska	1500 m	—N/a		2:33.603	4	Did not advance			24
Natalia Maliszewska; Patrycja Maliszewska; Nikola Mazur; Kamila Stormowska	3000 m relay	—N/a				4:10.074	3 **FB**	4:10.210	6

Mixed

Athlete	Event	Quarterfinal		Semifinal		Final	
Athlete	Event	Time	Rank	Time	Rank	Time	Rank
Łukasz Kuczyński; Nikola Mazur; Michał Niewiński; Kamila Stormowska	2000 m relay	2:50.513	4	Did not advance			11

== Ski jumping ==
Five male and two female ski jumpers from Poland qualified.

Men

Athlete	Event	Qualification			First round			Final			Total	
Athlete	Event	Distance	Points	Rank	Distance	Points	Rank	Distance	Points	Rank	Points	Rank
Stefan Hula Jr.	Normal hill	90.5	87.9	27 **Q**	103.0	127.0	23 **Q**	93.5	110.8	27	237.8	26
**Dawid Kubacki**	Normal hill	94.0	98.3	16 **Q**	104.0	133.1	8 **Q**	103.0	132.8	2	265.9	3rd place, bronze medalist(s)
Kamil Stoch	Normal hill	83.5	78.7	36 **Q**	101.5	136.3	3 **Q**	97.5	124.6	13	260.9	6
Piotr Żyła	Normal hill	102.5	112.1	3 **Q**	95.0	121.6	27 **Q**	99.0	123.9	14	245.5	21
Dawid Kubacki	Large hill	125.5	112.5	22 **Q**	131.0	123.7	25 **Q**	131.5	127.5	23	251.2	26
Kamil Stoch	Large hill	128.0	122.5	8 **Q**	137.5	140.3	4 **Q**	133.5	136.9	8	277.2	4
Paweł Wąsek	Large hill	117.5	96.5	36 **Q**	129.0	121.9	28 **Q**	134.5	132.4	16	254.3	21
Piotr Żyła	Large hill	120.0	106.3	27 **Q**	134.0	129.7	14 **Q**	131.0	125.8	25	255.5	18
Dawid Kubacki; Kamil Stoch; Paweł Wąsek; Piotr Żyła	Team large hill	—N/a			508.5	434.5	6 **Q**	499.0	445.6	5	880.1	6

Women

Athlete	Event	First round			Final			Total	
Athlete	Event	Distance	Points	Rank	Distance	Points	Rank	Points	Rank
Nicole Konderla	Normal hill	64.0	37.8	36	Did not advance			37.8	36
Kinga Rajda	Normal hill	69.0	40.9	35	Did not advance			40.9	35

Mixed

Athlete	Event	First round			Final			Total	
Athlete	Event	Distance	Points	Rank	Distance	Points	Rank	Points	Rank
Nicole Konderla; Dawid Kubacki; Kinga Rajda; Kamil Stoch	Team normal hill	351.5	386.1	5 **Q**	349.5	377.1	6	763.2	6

== Snowboarding ==
According to the quota allocation list, Poland qualified five athletes.

Parallel

Athlete	Event	Qualification		Round of 16	Quarterfinal	Semifinal	Final / BM	
Athlete	Event	Time	Rank	Opposition Time	Opposition Time	Opposition Time	Opposition Time	Rank
Oskar Kwiatkowski	Men's giant slalom	1:21.52	5 **Q**	Felicetti (ITA); **W** DNF	Mastnak (SLO); **L** DNF	Did not advance		7
Michał Nowaczyk	Men's giant slalom	1:21.64	7 **Q**	Payer (AUT); **L** +0.09	Did not advance			9
Weronika Biela-Nowaczyk	Women's giant slalom	1:30.75	22	Did not advance				
Aleksandra Król	Women's giant slalom	1:28.10	8 **Q**	Smolentsova (ROC); **W** –0.16	Ledecká (CZE); **L** DNF	Did not advance		8
Aleksandra Michalik	Women's giant slalom	1:37.11	24	Did not advance				

== Speed skating ==
Based on the results from the fall World Cups during the 2021–22 ISU Speed Skating World Cup season, Poland earned the following start quotas:

Men

Athlete	Event	Final	
Athlete	Event	Time	Rank
Zbigniew Bródka	1500 m	Did not start	
Marek Kania	500 m	34.92	16
Piotr Michalski	500 m	34.52	5
Piotr Michalski	1000 m	1:08.56	4
Damian Żurek	500 m	34.73	11
Damian Żurek	1000 m	1:09.08	13

Women

Athlete	Event	Final	
Athlete	Event	Time	Rank
Karolina Bosiek	1000 m	1:16.54	17
Natalia Czerwonka	1500 m	1:59.03	19
Magdalena Czyszczoń	1500 m	2:05.64	30
Magdalena Czyszczoń	5000 m	7:21.49	12
Andżelika Wójcik	500 m	37.78	11
Andżelika Wójcik	1000 m	1:16.79	20
Kaja Ziomek	500 m	37.70	9

Mass start

Athlete	Event	Semifinal			Final		
Athlete	Event	Points	Time	Rank	Points	Time	Rank
Zbigniew Bródka	Men's mass start	0	8:17.49	14	Did not advance		27
Artur Janicki	Men's mass start	0	7:44.48	11	Did not advance		22
Karolina Bosiek	Women's mass start	6	8:34.43	5 **Q**	DSQ		17
Magdalena Czyszczoń	Women's mass start	4	8:31.77	6 **Q**	2	8:21.07	10

Team pursuit

Athlete	Event	Quarterfinal		Semifinal		Final	
Athlete	Event	Opposition Time	Rank	Opposition Time	Rank	Opposition Time	Rank
Karolina Bosiek; Natalia Czerwonka; Magdalena Czyszczoń	Women's team pursuit	ROC; **L** 3:01.92	7	Did not advance		Final D Belarus; **L** 3:03.19	8
