= Speed skating at the 2022 Winter Olympics – Women's 1000 metres =

Women's 1000 metres at the XXIV Olympic Winter Games
- Speed skating
- Venue: National Speed Skating Oval, Beijing
- Date: 17 February 2022
- Competitors: 30 from 17 nations
- Winning time: 1:13.19

Medalists
1st place, gold medalist(s)		Miho Takagi	Japan
2nd place, silver medalist(s)		Jutta Leerdam	Netherlands
3rd place, bronze medalist(s)		Brittany Bowe	United States

The women's 1000 m competition in speed skating at the 2022 Winter Olympics was held on 17 February, at the Beijing National Speed Skating Oval ("Ice Ribbon") in Beijing. Miho Takagi of Japan won the event, becoming the first Japanese Olympic gold medalist in this event, and second Asian gold medalist after Zhang Hong in 2014. It was also her first Olympic gold medal in an individual event. Jutta Leerdam of the Netherlands won the silver medal, her first Olympic medal. Brittany Bowe of the United States was third, her first individual Olympic medal.

The 2018 champion and the Olympic record holder, Jorien ter Mors, retired from competitions. The silver medalist, Nao Kodaira, and the bronze medalist, Takagi, were both competing. Bowe was the 2021 World Single Distances champion at the 1000 m distance and also the world record holder at the beginning of the Olympics. Leerdam and Elizaveta Golubeva were the silver and bronze medalists, respectively. Bowe was leading the 2021–22 ISU Speed Skating World Cup at the 1000 m distance with four races completed before the Olympics, followed by Kodaira and Takagi. Takagi skated the season best time, 1:11.83 in Salt Lake City on 4 December 2021.

In pair 3, Antoinette de Jong took the lead with the first time below 1:15. This time was improved only in pair 11, when Jutta Leerdam skated 1:13.83, with four pairs to go. In pair 13, Takagi set the new Olympic record with 1:13.19, and Angelina Golikova had provisionally third time, shifting de Jong off the podium. In the last pair, Bowe skated the third time of the day.

== Qualification ==
A total of 30 entry quotas were available for the event, with a maximum of three athletes per NOC. The first 20 athletes qualified through their performance at the 2021–22 ISU Speed Skating World Cup, while the last ten earned quotas by having the best times among athletes not already qualified. A country could only earn the maximum three spots through the World Cup rankings.

The qualification time for the event (1:18.00) was released on July 1, 2021, and was unchanged from 2018. Skaters had the time period of July 1, 2021 – January 16, 2022 to achieve qualification times at valid International Skating Union (ISU) events.

== Records ==
Prior to this competition, the existing world and Olympic records were as follows.

World record	Brittany Bowe (USA)	1:11.61	Salt Lake City, United States	9 March 2019
Olympic record	Jorien ter Mors (NED)	1:13.56	Gangneung, South Korea	14 February 2018
Track record	Isabel Grevelt (NED)	1:17.89		9 October 2021

A new Olympic record was set during the competition.

Date	Round	Athlete	Country	Time	Record
17 February	Pair 11	Miho Takagi	Japan	1:13.19	OR, TR

== Results ==
The races were started at 16:30.

Rank	Pair	Lane	Name	Country	Time	Time behind	Notes
1st place, gold medalist(s)	13	I	Miho Takagi	Japan	1:13.19	—	OR
2nd place, silver medalist(s)	11	O	Jutta Leerdam	Netherlands	1:13.83	+0.64	
3rd place, bronze medalist(s)	15	O	Brittany Bowe	United States	1:14.61	+1.42	
4	13	O	Angelina Golikova	ROC	1:14.71	+1.52	
5	3	O	Antoinette de Jong	Netherlands	1:14.92	+1.73	
6	12	O	Ireen Wüst	Netherlands	1:15.11	+1.92	
7	11	I	Kimi Goetz	United States	1:15.40	+2.21	
8	5	I	Vanessa Herzog	Austria	1:15.644	+2.45	
9	15	I	Daria Kachanova	ROC	1:15.649	+2.45	
10	14	O	Nao Kodaira	Japan	1:15.65	+2.46	
11	6	I	Nadezhda Morozova	Kazakhstan	1:15.69	+2.50	
12	2	I	Alexa Scott	Canada	1:15.79	+2.60	
13	10	I	Olga Fatkulina	ROC	1:15.87	+2.68	
14	14	I	Li Qishi	China	1:15.99	+2.80	
15	5	O	Yin Qi	China	1:16.00	+2.81	
16	8	I	Kim Min-sun	South Korea	1:16.49	+3.30	
17	8	O	Karolina Bosiek	Poland	1:16.54	+3.35	
18	4	O	Ragne Wiklund	Norway	1:16.59	+3.40	
19	10	O	Yekaterina Aidova	Kazakhstan	1:16.70	+3.51	
20	12	I	Andżelika Wójcik	Poland	1:16.79	+3.60	
21	4	I	Ekaterina Sloeva	Belarus	1:16.83	+3.64	
22	9	O	Jin Jingzhu	China	1:16.90	+3.71	
23	2	O	Ellia Smeding	Great Britain	1:17.17	+3.98	
24	9	I	Huang Yu-ting	Chinese Taipei	1:17.35	+4.16	
25	7	O	Kim Hyun-yung	South Korea	1:17.50	+4.31	
26	6	O	Maddison Pearman	Canada	1:17.66	+4.47	
27	7	I	Nikola Zdráhalová	Czech Republic	1:18.75	+5.56	
28	1	O	Sandrine Tas	Belgium	1:18.79	+5.60	
29	3	I	Mihaela Hogaş	Romania	1:19.33	+6.14	
30	1	I	Park Ji-woo	South Korea	1:19.39	+6.20	
