= Speed skating at the 2022 Winter Olympics – Men's 1500 metres =

Men's 1500 metres at the XXIV Olympic Winter Games
- Speed skating
- Venue: National Speed Skating Oval, Beijing
- Date: 8 February
- Competitors: 29 from 14 nations

Medalists
1st place, gold medalist(s)		Kjeld Nuis	Netherlands
2nd place, silver medalist(s)		Thomas Krol	Netherlands
3rd place, bronze medalist(s)		Kim Min-seok	South Korea

The men's 1500 m competition in speed skating at the 2022 Winter Olympics will be held on 8 February, at the National Speed Skating Oval ("Ice Ribbon") in Beijing. Kjeld Nuis of the Netherlands defended his 2018 title and became again the Olympic champion. Thomas Krol, also of the Netherlands, won the silver medal. Kim Min-seok of South Korea won bronze.

The 2018 silver medalist, Patrick Roest, qualified for the Olympics as well, but did not skate this distance. The bronze medalist, Kim Min-seok, qualified as well. Nuis was also the world record holder at the start of the Olympics. Thomas Krol is the 2021 World Single Distances champion at the 1500 m distance, with Nuis and Roest being the silver and bronze medalist, respectively. Joey Mantia was leading the 2021–22 ISU Speed Skating World Cup at the 1500 m distance with four races completed before the Olympics, followed by Ning Zhongyan and Connor Howe. Mantia also skated the season best time, 1:41.15 in Salt Lake City on 4 December 2021.

The early leader was Ruslan Zakharov in pair 3, overtaken by Marcel Bosker in pair 4. Bosker was the first skater in the event with the time faster than the track record. Sergey Trofimov briefly took the lead in pair 9, before in pair 10 both Thomas Krol and Peter Kongshaug skated better than he. Krol skated faster than the Olympic record, but Nuis improved his time in pair 11. Kim, who skated in pair with Nuis, finished provisionally third. In the four pairs afterwards, Howe showed the best time and finished fifth.

== Qualification ==
A total of 30 entry quotas were available for the event, with a maximum of three athletes per NOC. The first 20 athletes qualified through their performance at the 2021–22 ISU Speed Skating World Cup, while the last ten earned quotas by having the best times among athletes not already qualified. A country could only earn the maximum three spots through the World Cup rankings.

The qualification time for the event (1:48.00) was released on July 1, 2021, and was unchanged from 2018. Skaters had the time period of July 1, 2021 – January 16, 2022 to achieve qualification times at valid International Skating Union (ISU) events.

== Records ==
Prior to this competition, the existing world, Olympic and track records were as follows.

World record	Kjeld Nuis (NED)	1:40.17	Salt Lake City, United States	10 March 2019
Olympic record	Derek Parra (USA)	1:43.95	Salt Lake City, United States	19 February 2002
Track record	Ning Zhongyan (CHN)	1:46.81		10 April 2021

A new Olympic record was set during the competition; the previous record was set twenty years earlier and was broken by 0.74 seconds; the top two finishers were under the previous record.

Date	Round	Athlete	Country	Time	Record
8 February	Pair 11	Kjeld Nuis	Netherlands	1:43.21	OR, TR

== Results ==
The races were held at 18:30.

Rank	Pair	Lane	Name	Country	Time	Time behind	Notes
1st place, gold medalist(s)	11	O	Kjeld Nuis	Netherlands	1:43.21		OR
2nd place, silver medalist(s)	10	I	Thomas Krol	Netherlands	1:43.55	+0.34	
3rd place, bronze medalist(s)	11	I	Kim Min-seok	South Korea	1:44.24	+1.03	
4	10	O	Peder Kongshaug	Norway	1:44.39	+1.18	
5	15	O	Connor Howe	Canada	1:44.86	+1.65	
6	13	O	Joey Mantia	United States	1:45.26	+2.05	
7	14	O	Ning Zhongyan	China	1:45.28	+2.07	
8	9	O	Sergey Trofimov	ROC	1:45.32	+2.11	
9	4	O	Marcel Bosker	Netherlands	1:45.42	+2.21	
10	13	I	Seitaro Ichinohe	Japan	1:45.53	+2.32	
11	9	I	Emery Lehman	United States	1:45.78	+2.57	
12	15	I	Allan Dahl Johansson	Norway	1:45.81	+2.60	
13	12	O	Bart Swings	Belgium	1:45.82	+2.61	
14	7	I	Daniil Aldoshkin	ROC	1:46.33	+3.12	
15	3	I	Ruslan Zakharov	ROC	1:46.46	+3.25	
16	12	I	Kristian Ulekleiv	Norway	1:46.56	+3.35	
17	14	I	Takuro Oda	Japan	1:46.60	+3.39	
18	5	I	Dmitriy Morozov	Kazakhstan	1:47.01	+3.80	
19	4	I	Cornelius Kersten	Great Britain	1:47.11	+3.90	
20	6	O	Wang Haotian	China	1:47.13	+3.92	
21	3	O	Park Seong-hyeon	South Korea	1:47.59	+4.38	
22	8	O	Tyson Langelaar	Canada	1:47.81	+4.60	
23	2	O	Antoine Gélinas-Beaulieu	Canada	1:48.00	+4.79	
24	2	I	Haralds Silovs	Latvia	1:48.24	+5.03	
25	6	I	Alessio Trentini	Italy	1:48.33	+5.12	
26	1	I	Peter Michael	New Zealand	1:48.68	+5.47	
27	5	O	Lian Ziwen	China	1:49.15	+5.94	
28	7	O	Casey Dawson	United States	1:49.45	+6.24	
29	8	I	Mathias Vosté	Belgium	1:49.93	+6.72	
