= Kazakhstan at the 2022 Winter Olympics =

- Flag of Kazakhstan
- IOC code: KAZ
- NOC: National Olympic Committee of the Republic of Kazakhstan
- Website: www.olympic.kz (in Kazakh, Russian, and English)

in Beijing, China 4–20 February 2022
- Competitors: 34 (17 men and 17 women) in 8 sports
- Flag bearers (opening): Yekaterina Aidova; Abzal Azhgaliyev
- Flag bearer (closing): Abzal Azhgaliyev
- Medals: Gold 0 Silver 0 Bronze 0 Total 0

Winter Olympics appearances (overview)
- 1994; 1998; 2002; 2006; 2010; 2014; 2018; 2022; 2026; 2030

Other related appearances
- Soviet Union (1956–1988); Unified Team (1992)

Kazakhstan competed at the 2022 Winter Olympics in Beijing, China, from 4 to 20 February 2022.

On January 21, 2022, speed skater Yekaterina Aidova and short track speed skater Abzal Azhgaliyev were named as the country's flagbearer during the opening ceremony. Meanwhile Azhgaliev was also the flagbearer during the closing ceremony.

== Competitors ==
The following is the list of number of competitors participating at the Games per sport/discipline.

Sport	Men	Women	Total
Alpine skiing	1	1	2
Biathlon	2	1	3
Cross-country skiing	2	5	7
Freestyle skiing	3	6	9
Nordic combined	1	0	1
Short track speed skating	3	2	5
Ski jumping	2	0	2
Speed skating	3	2	5
Total	17	17	34

== Alpine skiing ==
By meeting the basic qualification standards Kazakhstan qualified one male and one female alpine skier.

Athlete	Event	Run 1		Run 2		Total	
Athlete	Event	Time	Rank	Time	Rank	Time	Rank
Zakhar Kuchin	Men's giant slalom	DNF		Did not advance			
Zakhar Kuchin	Men's slalom	1:03.68	43	58.98	37	2:02.66	36
Alexandra Troitskaya	Women's slalom	DNF		Did not advance			

== Biathlon ==
Based on their Nations Cup rankings in the 2020–21 Biathlon World Cup and 2021–22 Biathlon World Cup, Kazakhstan has qualified a team of 2 men and 1 women.

Athlete	Event	Time	Misses	Rank
Vladislav Kireyev	Men's individual	52:29.2	0 (0+0+0+0)	25
Alexandr Mukhin	Men's individual	55:00.4	4 (1+1+0+2)	52
Alexandr Mukhin	Men's pursuit	47:45.0	8 (3+1+2+2)	57
Vladislav Kireyev	Men's sprint	27:21.7	1 (1+0)	77
Alexandr Mukhin	Men's sprint	26:37.2	1 (1+0)	49
Galina Vishnevskaya	Women's individual	49:32.3	1 (0+1+0+0)	44
Galina Vishnevskaya	Women's pursuit	41:47.9	4 (1+0+0+3)	52
Galina Vishnevskaya	Women's sprint	23:22.6	1 (1+0)	52

== Cross-country skiing ==
Kazakhstan qualified two male and five female cross-country skiers.

Men

Athlete	Event	Classical		Freestyle		Final		
Athlete	Event	Time	Rank	Time	Rank	Time	Deficit	Rank
Vitaliy Pukhkalo	Men's 15 km classical	—				40:39.6	+2:44.8	25
Yevgeniy Velichko	Men's 15 km classical	—				41:27.3	+3:32.5	40
Vitaliy Pukhkalo	30 km skiathlon	41:36.8	24	41:32.1	39	1:23:45.1	+7:35.3	32
Yevgeniy Velichko	30 km skiathlon	44:20.9	53	LAP				57
Yevgeniy Velichko	50 km freestyle	—				1:18:43.8	+7:11.1	43

Women

Athlete	Event	Classical		Freestyle		Total		
Athlete	Event	Time	Rank	Time	Rank	Time	Deficit	Rank
Kseniya Shalygina	10 km classical	—				32:09.9	+4:03.6	53
Angelina Shuryga	10 km classical	—				32:08.8	+4:02.5	52
Nadezhda Stepashkina	10 km classical	—				32:27.2	+4:20.9	57
Valeriya Tyuleneva	10 km classical	—				32:52.1	+4:45.8	59
Kseniya Shalygina	15 km skiathlon	25:25.9	44	24:21.5	45	50:37.7	+6:24.0	48
Angelina Shuryga	15 km skiathlon	26:05.6	50	24:13.2	43	50:55.3	+6:41.6	49
Nadezhda Stepashkina	15 km skiathlon	27:26.4	58	25:20.1	58	53:35.3	+9:21.6	58
Valeriya Tyuleneva	15 km skiathlon	26:07.8	51	24:41.6	52	51:30.8	+7:17.1	51
Irina Bykova	30 km freestyle	—				1:42:42.0	+17:48.0	54
Angelina Shuryga	30 km freestyle	—				1:36:29.6	+11:35.6	42
Nadezhda Stepashkina	30 km freestyle	—				1:39:38.8	+14:44.8	49
Kseniya Shalygina; Angelina Shuryga; Nadezhda Stepashkina; Irina Bykova	4 × 5 km relay	—				1:01:15.4	+7:34.4	15

Sprint
Men

Athlete	Event	Qualification		Quarterfinal		Semifinal		Final	
Athlete	Event	Time	Rank	Time	Rank	Time	Rank	Time	Rank
Vitaliy Pukhkalo	Sprint	3:06.31	66	Did not advance					
Yevgeniy Velichko	Sprint	3:04.52	62	Did not advance					

Women

Athlete	Event	Qualification		Quarterfinal		Semifinal		Final	
Athlete	Event	Time	Rank	Time	Rank	Time	Rank	Time	Rank
Irina Bykova	Sprint	3:42.70	68	Did not advance					
Kseniya Shalygina	Sprint	3:41.55	67	Did not advance					
Angelina Shuryga	Sprint	3:35.93	60	Did not advance					
Nadezhda Stepashkina	Sprint	3:32.56	51	Did not advance					
Kseniya Shalygina; Nadezhda Stepashkina	Team sprint	—				24:57.59	10	Did not advance	19

== Freestyle skiing ==
Aerials
Men

Athlete	Event	Qualification				Final			
Athlete	Event	Jump 1		Jump 2		Jump 1		Jump 2	
Athlete	Event	Points	Rank	Points	Rank	Points	Rank	Points	Rank
Sherzod Khashyrbayev	Aerials	109.74	15	69.23	13	Did not advance			19

Women

Athlete	Event	Qualification				Final					
Athlete	Event	Jump 1		Jump 2		Jump 1		Jump 2		Final	
Athlete	Event	Points	Rank	Points	Rank	Points	Rank	Points	Rank	Points	Rank
Zhanbota Aldabergenova	Aerials	80.56	12	80.56	7	Did not advance					13
Akmarzhan Kalmurzayeva	Aerials	70.86	19	98.68	1 Q	71.23	11	Did not advance			11

Mixed

Athlete	Event	Final			
Athlete	Event	Jump 1		Jump 2	
Athlete	Event	Points	Rank	Points	Rank
Sherzod Khashyrbayev; Zhanbota Aldabergenova; Akmarzhan Kalmurzayeva	Mixed team	DNS		Did not advance	

Moguls
Men

Athlete	Event	Qualification								Final											
Athlete	Event	Run 1				Run 2				Run 1				Run 2				Run 3			
Athlete	Event	Time	Points	Total	Rank	Time	Points	Total	Rank	Time	Points	Total	Rank	Time	Points	Total	Rank	Time	Points	Total	Rank
Pavel Kolmakov	Moguls	24.85	58.86	74.09	17	25.18	54.74	69.54	11	Did not advance											21
Dmitriy Reiherd	Moguls	25.25	60.73	75.43	12	25.24	60.18	74.90	7 Q	24.78	61.58	76.90	9 QF	25.32	62.16	76.77	8	Did not advance			8

Women

Athlete	Event	Qualification								Final											
Athlete	Event	Run 1				Run 2				Run 1				Run 2				Run 3			
Athlete	Event	Time	Points	Total	Rank	Time	Points	Total	Rank	Time	Points	Total	Rank	Time	Points	Total	Rank	Time	Points	Total	Rank
Ayaulym Amrenova	Moguls	29.97	52.59	66.82	16	30.45	52.09	65.78	12	Did not advance											22
Yuliya Galysheva	Moguls	DNS				30.47	55.55	69.21	9 Q	29.61	60.34	74.97	7 Q	29.83	35.36	49.74	11	Did not advance			11
Anastassiya Gorodko	Moguls	DNF				28.97	52.12	67.47	11	Did not advance											21
Olessya Graur	Moguls	33.29	44.69	57.18	23	32.05	26.60	38.48	18	Did not advance											28

== Nordic combined ==
Athlete	Event	Ski jumping			Cross-country		Total	
Athlete	Event	Distance	Points	Rank	Time	Rank	Time	Rank
Chingiz Rakparov	Individual normal hill/10 km	79.5	69.9	38	27:51.1	41	32:03.1	41
Chingiz Rakparov	Individual large hill/10 km	111.5	69.6	38	30:07.5	46	34:48.5	43

== Short track speed skating ==
Kazakhstan has qualified three male and one female short track speed skater in the individual races. They received one additional female quota to allow them to participate in the mixed relay.

Athlete	Event	Heat		Quarterfinal		Semifinal		Final	
Athlete	Event	Time	Rank	Time	Rank	Time	Rank	Time	Rank
Abzal Azhgaliyev	Men's 500 m	40.870	1 Q	40.643	3 q	40.462	2 FA	40.869	4
Adil Galiakhmetov	Men's 500 m	40.722	2 Q	40.925	5	Did not advance			19
Denis Nikisha	Men's 500 m	40.482	1 Q	40.355	1 Q	41.005	4 FB	41.329	8
Adil Galiakhmetov	Men's 1000 m	1:24.855	3	Did not advance					22
Adil Galiakhmetov	Men's 1500 m	—		2:11.823	2 Q	2:18.291	4 ADVA	2:11.584	8
Denis Nikisha	Men's 1500 m	—		PEN		Did not advance			
Olga Tikhonova	Women's 1000 m	1:56.438	3	Did not advance					24
Olga Tikhonova	Women's 1500 m	—		PEN		Did not advance			

Mixed

Athlete	Event	Quarterfinal		Semifinal		Final	
Athlete	Event	Time	Rank	Time	Rank	Time	Rank
Abzal Azhgaliyev; Yana Khan; Denis Nikisha; Olga Tikhonova	2000 m relay	2:43.004	3 q	2:42.575	3 QB	2:44.148	5

== Ski jumping ==
Men

Athlete	Event	Qualification			First round			Final			Total	
Athlete	Event	Distance	Points	Rank	Distance	Points	Rank	Distance	Points	Rank	Points	Rank
Sergey Tkachenko	Large hill	103.0	60.7	54	Did not advance							
Danil Vassilyev	Large hill	98.5	69.4	51	Did not advance							
Sergey Tkachenko	Normal hill	68.0	43.1	50 Q	95.0	110.3	41	Did not advance				
Danil Vassilyev	Normal hill	70.5	46.2	49 Q	92.0	101.0	46	Did not advance				

== Speed skating ==
Athlete	Event	Race	
Athlete	Event	Time	Rank
Ivan Arzhanikov	Men's 500 m	35.82	28
Denis Kuzin	Men's 1000 m	1:10.077	23
Dmitriy Morozov	Men's 1000 m	1:09.61	17
Dmitriy Morozov	Men's 1500 m	1:47.01	18
Yekaterina Aidova	Women's 500 m	1:59.01	18
Yekaterina Aidova	Women's 1000 m	1:16.70	19
Nadezhda Morozova	Women's 1000 m	1:15.69	11
Yekaterina Aidova	Women's 1500 m	38.54	20
Nadezhda Morozova	Women's 1500 m	1:56.85	14
Nadezhda Morozova	Women's 3000 m	4:04.97	13

Mass start

Athlete	Event	Semifinals			Finals		
Athlete	Event	Points	Time	Rank	Points	Time	Rank
Dmitriy Morozov	Men's	2	8:08.73	10	Did not advance		19
Nadezhda Morozova	Women's	3	8:42.23	8 Q	0	8:21.05	14
