= Speed skating at the 2022 Winter Olympics – Women's 3000 metres =

Speed skating event at the 2022 Winter Olympics

Women's 3000 metres at the XXIV Olympic Winter Games
- Speed skating
- Venue: National Speed Skating Oval, Beijing
- Date: 5 February 2022
- Competitors: 20 from 12 nations
- Winning time: 3:56.93

Medalists
1st place, gold medalist(s)		Irene Schouten	Netherlands
2nd place, silver medalist(s)		Francesca Lollobrigida	Italy
3rd place, bronze medalist(s)		Isabelle Weidemann	Canada

The women's 3000 m competition in speed skating at the 2022 Winter Olympics was held on 5 February, at the National Speed Skating Oval ("Ice Ribbon") in Beijing. The event was won by Irene Schouten representing the Netherlands for whom it was the first Olympic gold medal. Schouten also set the new Olympic record. Francesca Lollobrigida of Italy was second, and Isabelle Weidemann of Canada third. For both of them, it was the first Olympic medal. In addition, Lollobrigida's medal was the first ever Italian Olympic medal in women's speed skating.

The defending champion was Carlijn Achtereekte. The 2018 silver medalist Ireen Wüst, who is also the 2006 and 2014 Olympic champion at this distance, and the bronze medalist, Antoinette de Jong, also qualified for the Olympics, however, Wüst was not selected to skate 3000 m. De Jong is the 2021 World Single Distances champion at the 3000 m distance. Martina Sáblíková, the world record holder at the beginning of the Olympics and the 2010 Olympic champion at this distance, and Irene Schouten are the silver and bronze medalist, respectively. Isabelle Weidemann was leading the 2021–22 ISU Speed Skating World Cup in long distances with three races completed before the Olympics, followed by Ragne Wiklund, Schouten, and Francesca Lollobrigida. Schouten skated the season best time, 3:52.89 in Salt Lake City on 3 December 2021.

The first pair featured the 2002 champion at this distance and the Olympic record holder Claudia Pechstein, skating at the age of 49, however, she was not in medal contention. Achtereekte in pair 3 lost to Miho Takagi and thus was not able to defend the title. Takagi's time was improved only in pair 8 by Sáblíková, who took the lead with Achtereekte still in the third position, and two pairs to go. In pair 9, Weidemann became the first skater to finish below 4 minutes, leaving Sáblíková second, and Wiklund finished with the provisionally third time. In the last pair, both Schouten and Lollobrigida improved on the Weidemann's time, pushing her to the bronze medal position.

== Qualification ==
A total of 20 entry quotas were available for the event, with a maximum of three athletes per NOC. The first 14 athletes qualified through their performance at the 2021–22 ISU Speed Skating World Cup, while the last six earned quotas by having the best times among athletes not already qualified. A country could only earn the maximum three spots through the World Cup rankings.

The qualification time for the event (4:12.00) was released on July 1, 2021, and was unchanged from 2018. Skaters had the time period of July 1, 2021 – January 16, 2022 to achieve qualification times at valid International Skating Union (ISU) events.

== Records ==
Prior to this competition, the existing world, Olympic and track records were as follows.

World record	Martina Sáblíková (CZE)	3:52.02	Salt Lake City, United States	9 March 2019
Olympic record	Claudia Pechstein (GER)	3:57.70	Salt Lake City, United States	20 February 2002
Track record	Han Mei (CHN)	4:16.87		7 April 2021

A new Olympic record was set in the competition.

Date	Round	Athlete	Country	Time	Record
5 February	Pair 10	Irene Schouten	Netherlands	3:56.93	OR, TR

== Results ==
The races were started at 16:30.

Rank	Pair	Lane	Name	Country	Time	Time behind	Notes
1st place, gold medalist(s)	10	O	Irene Schouten	Netherlands	3:56.93		OR
2nd place, silver medalist(s)	10	I	Francesca Lollobrigida	Italy	3:58.06	+1.13	
3rd place, bronze medalist(s)	9	I	Isabelle Weidemann	Canada	3:58.64	+1.71	
4	8	I	Martina Sáblíková	Czech Republic	4:00.34	+3.41	
5	9	O	Ragne Wiklund	Norway	4:01.44	+4.51	
6	3	I	Miho Takagi	Japan	4:01.77	+4.84	
7	3	O	Carlijn Achtereekte	Netherlands	4:02.21	+5.28	
8	6	O	Antoinette de Jong	Netherlands	4:02.37	+5.44	
9	6	I	Ayano Sato	Japan	4:03.40	+6.47	
10	4	O	Evgeniia Lalenkova	ROC	4:03.42	+6.49	
11	5	O	Natalya Voronina	ROC	4:03.84	+6.91	
12	5	I	Valérie Maltais	Canada	4:04.27	+7.34	
13	2	O	Nadezhda Morozova	Kazakhstan	4:04.97	+8.04	
14	8	O	Ivanie Blondin	Canada	4:06.40	+9.47	
15	7	O	Han Mei	China	4:07.74	+10.81	
16	7	I	Maryna Zuyeva	Belarus	4:08.70	+11.77	
17	1	I	Adake Ahenaer	China	4:12.28	+15.35	
18	4	I	Nikola Zdráhalová	Czech Republic	4:13.13	+16.20	
19	2	I	Mia Kilburg	United States	4:13.42	+16.49	
20	1	O	Claudia Pechstein	Germany	4:17.16	+20.23	
