= Belarus at the 2022 Winter Olympics =

- Flag of Belarus
- IOC code: BLR
- NOC: Belarus Olympic Committee
- Website: www.noc.by/en

in Beijing, China 4–20 February 2022
- Competitors: 26 (11 men and 15 women) in 6 sports
- Flag bearers (opening): Ignat Golovatsiuk; Hanna Nifantava
- Flag bearer (closing): Ignat Golovatsiuk
- Medals Ranked 24th: Gold 0 Silver 2 Bronze 0 Total 2

Winter Olympics appearances (overview)
- 1994; 1998; 2002; 2006; 2010; 2014; 2018; 2022; 2026

Other related appearances
- Poland (1924–1936); Soviet Union (1952–1988); Unified Team (1992); Individual Neutral Athletes (2026)

Belarus competed at the 2022 Winter Olympics in Beijing, China, from 4 to 20 February 2022. This was Belarus' last appearance at the Winter Olympics as Belarus along with Russia was barred from competing at the 2026 Winter Olympics in Milan and Cortina d'Ampezzo as a result of the ongoing Russian invasion of Ukraine.

Speed skaters Ignat Golovatsiuk and Hanna Nifantava were the country's flagbearer during the opening ceremony. Golovatsiuk was also the flagbearer during the closing ceremony.

== Competitors ==
The following is a list of the number of competitors who participated at the Games per sport/discipline.

Sport	Men	Women	Total
Alpine skiing	0	1	1
Biathlon	4	4	8
Cross-country skiing	2	2	4
Figure skating	1	1	2
Freestyle skiing	3	3	6
Speed skating	1	4	5
Total	11	15	26

== Medalists ==
The following Belarus competitors won medals at the games. In the discipline sections below, the medalists' names are bolded.

Medal	Name	Sport	Event	Date
Silver	Anton Smolski	Biathlon	Men's individual	8 February
Silver	Hanna Huskova	Freestyle skiing	Women's aerials	14 February

== Alpine skiing ==
By meeting the basic qualification standards Belarus qualified one male and one female alpine skier, but chose to only use their female quota.

Athlete	Event	Run 1		Run 2		Total	
Athlete	Event	Time	Rank	Time	Rank	Time	Rank
Maria Shkanova	Women's slalom	54.79	25	53.10	11	1:47.89	20

== Biathlon ==
Based on their Nations Cup rankings in the 2020–21 Biathlon World Cup and 2021–22 Biathlon World Cup, Belarus has qualified a team of 4 men and 4 women.

Men

Athlete	Event	Time	Misses	Rank
Mikita Labastau	Individual	54:29.7	4 (1+2+0+1)	47
Dzmitry Lazouski	Individual	55:26.4	4 (3+0+1+0)	58
**Anton Smolski**	Individual	49:02.2	0 (0+0+0+0)	2nd place, silver medalist(s)
Maksim Varabei	Individual	58:59.5	8 (1+3+2+2)	86
Anton Smolski	Mass start	41:22.3	4 (1+1+0+2)	17
Mikita Labastau	Pursuit	45:42.0	6 (3+0+1+2)	45
Anton Smolski	Pursuit	42:48.2	6 (1+1+3+1)	14
Mikita Labastau	Sprint	26:47.0	4 (2+2)	57
Dzmitry Lazouski	Sprint	27:22.9	3 (0+3)	78
Anton Smolski	Sprint	25:12.9	1 (0+1)	10
Maksim Varabei	Sprint	27:10.4	4 (3+1)	71
Mikita Labastau; Dzmitry Lazouski; Anton Smolski; Maksim Varabei	Relay	1:21:49.2	2+11	8

Women

Athlete	Event	Time	Misses	Rank
Dzinara Alimbekava	Individual	44:44.4	1 (0+0+0+1)	5
Elena Kruchinkina	Individual	49:56.8	4 (0+3+0+1)	48
Iryna Leshchanka	Individual	49:10.3	4 (1+1+1+1)	41
Hanna Sola	Individual	50:35.9	7 (3+2+1+1)	54
Dzinara Alimbekava	Mass start	42:19.2	6 (1+1+2+2)	12
Hanna Sola	Mass start	41:57.2	8 (2+2+1+3)	10
Dzinara Alimbekava	Pursuit	38:13.7	3 (0+0+3+0)	19
Iryna Leshchanka	Pursuit	38:16.9	2 (0+0+0+2)	20
Hanna Sola	Pursuit	36:45.8	3 (1+1+1+0)	4
Dzinara Alimbekava	Sprint	22:12.8	1 (0+1)	15
Elena Kruchinkina	Sprint	24:10.1	4 (1+3)	70
Iryna Leshchanka	Sprint	23:32.5	3 (2+1)	60
Hanna Sola	Sprint	22:36.4	4 (1+3)	26
Dzinara Alimbekava; Elena Kruchinkina; Iryna Leshchanka; Hanna Sola	Relay	1:16:34.4	5+16	13

Mixed

Athlete	Event	Time	Misses	Rank
Dzinara Alimbekava; Mikita Labastau; Anton Smolski; Hanna Sola	Relay	1:08:00.2	2+10	6

== Cross-country skiing ==
Belarus qualified two male and two female cross-country skiers.

Distance

Athlete	Event	Classical		Freestyle		Final		
Athlete	Event	Time	Rank	Time	Rank	Time	Deficit	Rank
Yahor Shpuntau	Men's 15 km classical	—N/a				44:05.2	+6:10.4	68
Aliaksandr Voranau	Men's 15 km classical	—N/a				DNS		
Hanna Karaliova	Women's 30 km freestyle	—N/a				DNS		

Sprint

Athlete	Event	Qualification		Quarterfinal		Semifinal		Final		
Athlete	Event	Time	Rank	Time	Rank	Time	Rank	Time	Deficit	Rank
Yahor Shpuntau	Men's Individual	3:02.17	53	Did not advance						
Aliaksandr Voranau	Men's Individual	DNS		Did not advance						
Yahor Shpuntau; Aliaksandr Voranau	Men's Team	—N/a				20:34.07	6	Did not advance		12
Hanna Karaliova; Anastasia Kirillova	Women's Team	—N/a				DNS		Did not advance		

== Figure skating ==
In the 2021 World Figure Skating Championships in Stockholm, Sweden, Belarus secured one quota in the men's singles competition.

Athlete	Event	SP / SD		FS / FD		Total	
Athlete	Event	Points	Rank	Points	Rank	Points	Rank
Konstantin Milyukov	Men's singles	78.49	21 **Q**	143.73	20	222.22	20
Viktoriia Safonova	Ladies' singles	61.46	16 **Q**	123.37	13	184.83	13

== Freestyle skiing ==
Belarus qualified 3 men and 3 women.

Aerials

Athlete	Event	Qualification				Final					
Athlete	Event	Jump 1		Jump 2		Jump 1		Jump 2		Final	
Athlete	Event	Points	Rank	Points	Rank	Points	Rank	Points	Rank	Total	Rank
Pavel Dzik	Men's	106.20	18	81.45	16	Did not advance					22
Maksim Gustik	Men's	109.74	16	97.20	14	Did not advance					20
Stanislau Hladchenka	Men's	115.49	10	107.69	6 **Q**	115.93	9	116.29	6	Did not advance	11
Anastasiya Andryianava	Women's	81.58	11	81.58	6 **Q**	59.22	11	70.11	12	Did not advance	12
Anna Derugo	Women's	58.59	24	58.59	18	Did not advance					24
Hanna Huskova	Women's	92.00	6 **Q**	—N/a		89.41	5	92.00	6	107.95	2nd place, silver medalist(s)
Hanna Huskova; Stanislau Hladchenko; Maxim Gustik	Mixed team	—N/a				273.67	6	Did not advance			

== Speed skating ==
Belarus qualified 1 man and 4 women.

Distance

Athlete	Event	Race	
Athlete	Event	Time	Rank
Ignat Golovatsiuk	Men's 500 m	37.05	30
Ignat Golovatsiuk	Men's 1000 m	1:08.64	6
Hanna Nifantava	Women's 500 m	38.30	19
Ekaterina Sloeva	Women's 1000 m	1:16.83	21
Ekaterina Sloeva	Women's 1500 m	1:58.41	16
Maryna Zuyeva	Women's 1500 m	1:59.82	23
Maryna Zuyeva	Women's 3000 m	4:08.70	16
Maryna Zuyeva	Women's 5000 m	7:02.91	9

Mass start

Athlete	Event	Semifinal			Final		
Athlete	Event	Points	Time	Rank	Points	Time	Rank
Ignat Golovatsiuk	Men's	0	7:53.59	13	Did not advance		24
Yauheniya Varabyova	Women's	2	8:43.65	9	Did not advance		18
Maryna Zuyeva	Women's	2	8:31.54	8 **Q**	4	8:20.10	6

Team pursuit

Athlete	Event	Quarterfinal		Semifinal		Final	
Athlete	Event	Opposition Time	Rank	Opposition Time	Rank	Opposition Time	Rank
Ekaterina Sloeva; Yauheniya Varabyova; Maryna Zuyeva	Women's	Canada; **L** 3:02.00	8	Did not advance		Final D Poland; **L** 3:03.19	8
