= Speed skating at the 2022 Winter Olympics =

Speed skating at the XXIV Olympic Winter Games
- Speed skating pictogram
- Venue: National Speed Skating Oval
- Dates: 5–19 February 2022
- No. of events: 14 (7 men, 7 women)

Speed skating at the 2022 Winter Olympics was held at the National Speed Skating Oval ("Ice Ribbon") in Beijing, China between 5 and 19 February 2022. It was the 24th time speed skating was held at the Winter Olympics (17th time for women).

A total of 166 quota spots (83 per gender) were distributed to the sport, a decline of 14 from the 2018 Winter Olympics. For the first time, gender equality was achieved in terms of quotas. A total of 14 events were contested, seven for men and seven for women.

== Qualification ==
A total quota of 166 athletes was allowed to compete at the Games (maximum 83 men and 83 women). For the 2018 Winter Olympics the total quota was 180 athletes (maximum 100 men and 80 women). The maximum total number of athletes per gender per nation was 9, compared to 10 in 2018. Countries were assigned quotas based on the results of ISU Speed Skating World Cup competitions. When quota were reached, each nation was permitted to enter a maximum of three athletes per gender for all events apart from the 5000m (women), 10,000m (men) and mass start events, for which they could enter a maximum of two athletes per event.

=== Qualification times ===
The following qualification times were released on July 1, 2021, and were unchanged from 2018.

Event	Men	Women
500 metres	35.70	39.50
1000 metres	1:10.50	1:18.00
1500 metres	1:48.00	1:59.50
3000 metres	—N/a	4:12.00
5000 metres	6:30.00	7:20.00 or 4:08.00 (3000 m)
10,000 metres	13:30.00 or 6:25.00 (5000 m)	—N/a
Mass start	1:57.50 (1500 m)	2:10.00 (1500 m)

== Competition schedule ==
The following was the competition schedule for all speed skating events. With the exception of the Team pursuit events, all rounds of each event were concluded within a single session.

All times are local times.

Day	Date	Time	Event
Day 1	Saturday, 5 February	16:30-18:05	Women's 3000 metres
Day 2	Sunday, 6 February	16:30-18:25	Men's 5000 metres
Day 3	Monday, 7 February	16:30-18:05	Women's 1500 metres
Day 4	Tuesday, 8 February	18:30-20:00	Men's 1500 metres
Day 6	Thursday, 10 February	20:00-21:30	Women's 5000 metres
Day 7	Friday, 11 February	16:00-18:05	Men's 10,000 metres
Day 8	Saturday, 12 February	16:00-17:45	Team pursuit women – Quarterfinals
Day 8	Saturday, 12 February	16:00-17:45	Men's 500 metres
Day 9	Sunday, 13 February	21:00-22:50	Team pursuit men – Quarterfinals
Day 9	Sunday, 13 February	21:00-22:50	Women's 500 metres
Day 11	Tuesday, 15 February	14:30-17:15	Team pursuit men – Finals
Day 11	Tuesday, 15 February	14:30-17:15	Team pursuit women – Finals
Day 13	Thursday, 17 February	16:30-17:55	Women's 1000 metres
Day 14	Friday, 18 February	16:30-17:50	Men's 1000 metres
Day 15	Saturday, 19 February	15:00-17:35	Mass start men
Day 15	Saturday, 19 February	15:00-17:35	Mass start women

== Medal summary ==
=== Medal table ===
* Host nation (China)

Rank	Nation	Gold	Silver	Bronze	Total
1	Netherlands	6	4	2	12
2	Sweden	2	0	0	2
3	Canada	1	3	1	5
3	Japan	1	3	1	5
5	Norway	1	0	2	3
5	United States	1	0	2	3
7	Belgium	1	0	0	1
7	China*	1	0	0	1
9	South Korea	0	2	2	4
10	Italy	0	1	2	3
11	ROC	0	1	1	2
12	Czech Republic	0	0	1	1
Totals (12 entries)		14	14	14	42

=== Men's events ===
Event	Gold		Silver		Bronze	
500 metres	Gao Tingyu; China	34.32 OR	Cha Min-kyu; South Korea	34.39	Wataru Morishige; Japan	34.49
1000 metres	Thomas Krol; Netherlands	1:07.92	Laurent Dubreuil; Canada	1:08.32	Håvard Holmefjord Lorentzen; Norway	1:08.48
1500 metres	Kjeld Nuis; Netherlands	1:43.21 OR	Thomas Krol; Netherlands	1:43.55	Kim Min-seok; South Korea	1:44.24
5000 metres	Nils van der Poel; Sweden	6:08.84 OR	Patrick Roest; Netherlands	6:09.31	Hallgeir Engebråten; Norway	6:09.88
10,000 metres	Nils van der Poel; Sweden	12:30.74 WR, OR	Patrick Roest; Netherlands	12:44.59	Davide Ghiotto; Italy	12:45.98
Mass start	Bart Swings; Belgium	63 points	Chung Jae-won; South Korea	40 points	Lee Seung-hoon; South Korea	20 points
Team pursuit	Norway; Hallgeir Engebråten; Peder Kongshaug; Sverre Lunde Pedersen	3:38.08	ROC; Daniil Aldoshkin; Sergey Trofimov; Ruslan Zakharov	3:40.46	United States; Casey Dawson; Emery Lehman; Joey Mantia; Ethan Cepuran^{[a]}	3:38.81

=== Women's events ===
Event	Gold		Silver		Bronze	
500 metres	Erin Jackson; United States	37.04	Miho Takagi; Japan	37.12	Angelina Golikova; ROC	37.21
1000 metres	Miho Takagi; Japan	1:13.19 OR	Jutta Leerdam; Netherlands	1:13.83	Brittany Bowe; United States	1:14.61
1500 metres	Ireen Wüst; Netherlands	1:53.28 OR	Miho Takagi; Japan	1:53.72	Antoinette de Jong; Netherlands	1:54.82
3000 metres	Irene Schouten; Netherlands	3:56.93 OR	Francesca Lollobrigida; Italy	3:58.06	Isabelle Weidemann; Canada	3:58.64
5000 metres	Irene Schouten; Netherlands	6:43.51 OR	Isabelle Weidemann; Canada	6:48.18	Martina Sáblíková; Czech Republic	6:50.09
Mass start	Irene Schouten; Netherlands	60 points	Ivanie Blondin; Canada	40 points	Francesca Lollobrigida; Italy	20 points
Team pursuit	Canada; Ivanie Blondin; Valérie Maltais; Isabelle Weidemann	2:53.44 OR	Japan; Ayano Sato; Miho Takagi; Nana Takagi	3:04.47	Netherlands; Marijke Groenewoud; Irene Schouten; Ireen Wüst; Antoinette de Jong^{[a]}	2:56.86

^{a} Skaters who did not participate in the final of the team pursuit event, but received medals as part of the team, having taken part in an earlier round.

== Participating nations ==
27 nations sent speed skaters to compete in the speed skating events.

- Argentina
- Austria
- Belarus
- Belgium
- Canada
- China
- Chinese Taipei
- Colombia
- Czech Republic
- Denmark
- Estonia
- Germany
- Great Britain
- Italy
- Japan
- Kazakhstan
- Latvia
- Netherlands
- New Zealand
- Norway
- Poland
- ROC
- Romania
- South Korea
- Sweden
- Switzerland
- United States

== Records ==
=== Olympic records ===
Event	Date	Round	Athlete	Country	Time	Record	Ref
Women's 3000 metres	5 February	Pair 10	Irene Schouten	Netherlands	3:56.93	OR	
Men's 5000 metres	6 February	Pair 5	Patrick Roest	Netherlands	6:09.31	OR	
Men's 5000 metres	6 February	Pair 10	Nils van der Poel	Sweden	6:08.84	OR	
Women's 1500 metres	7 February	Pair 12	Ireen Wüst	Netherlands	1:53.28	OR	
Men's 1500 metres	8 February	Pair 11	Kjeld Nuis	Netherlands	1:43.21	OR	
Women's 5000 metres	10 February	Pair 6	Irene Schouten	Netherlands	6:43.51	OR	
Men's 10,000 metres	11 February	Pair 5	Nils van der Poel	Sweden	12:30.74	WR, OR	
Men's 500 metres	12 February	Pair 7	Gao Tingyu	China	34.32	OR	
Women's team pursuit	12 February	Quarterfinal 1	Ayano Sato; Miho Takagi; Nana Takagi	Japan	2:53.61	OR	
Men's team pursuit	15 February	Semifinal 2	Daniil Aldoshkin; Sergey Trofimov; Ruslan Zakharov	ROC	3:36.62	OR	
Women's team pursuit	15 February	Final A	Ivanie Blondin; Valérie Maltais; Isabelle Weidemann	Canada	2:53.44	OR	
Women's 1000 metres	17 February	Pair 13	Miho Takagi	Japan	1:13.19	OR	

== Controversy ==
In the men's 500 metres event, a false start was called in the last two heats, one of which included current World Cup champion Laurent Dubreuil. This was questioned by 1992 Winter Olympics Champion Bart Veldkamp.
