= 2022 Winter Olympics closing ceremony flag bearers =

During the closing ceremony of the 2022 Winter Olympics in Beijing, China the flag bearers of 91 National Olympic Committees (NOCs) arrived into Beijing National Stadium on February 20. The flag bearers from each participating country entered the stadium informally in single file, and behind them marched all the athletes. The flags of each country were not necessarily carried by the same flag bearer as in the opening ceremony.

The parade order was identical to the opening ceremony's Parade of Nations.

== List ==
The following is a list of each country's flag bearer. The list is sorted by the sequence that each nation appeared in the Ceremony. The names are given in their official designations by the IOC, and the Chinese names follow their official designations by the Beijing Organizing Committee for the 2022 Olympic and Paralympic Winter Games.

| Order | Nation | Chinese name | Pinyin | Flag bearer | Sport | Ref. |
|---|---|---|---|---|---|---|
| 1 | Greece | 希腊 | Xīlà | Ioannis Antoniou | Alpine skiing | |
| 2 | Turkey | 土耳其 | Tǔěrqí | Volunteer | —N/a | |
| 3 | Malta | 马耳他 | Mǎěrtā | Volunteer | —N/a | |
| 4 | Madagascar | 马达加斯加 | Mǎdájiāsījiā | Mathieu Neumuller | Alpine skiing | |
| 5 | Malaysia | 马来西亚 | Mǎláixīyà | Jeffrey Webb | Alpine skiing | |
| 6 | Ecuador | 厄瓜多尔 | Èguāduōěr | Volunteer | —N/a | |
| 7 | Eritrea | 厄立特里亚 | Èlìtélǐyà | Shannon-Ogbnai Abeda | Alpine skiing | |
| 8 | Jamaica | 牙买加 | Yámǎijiā | Rolando Reid | Bobsleigh | |
| 9 | Belgium | 比利时 | Bǐlìshí | Hanne Desmet | Short track speed skating | |
| 10 | Japan | 日本 | Rìběn | Arisa Go | Speed skating | |
| 11 | Chinese Taipei | 中华台北 | Zhōnghuá Táiběi | Wen-Yi Lee | Alpine skiing | |
| 12 | Hong Kong | 中国香港 | Zhōngguó Xiānggǎng | Volunteer | —N/a | |
| 13 | Denmark | 丹麦 | Dānmài | Stefan Due Schmidt | Speed skating | |
| 14 | Ukraine | 乌克兰 | Wūkèlán | Olena Bilosiuk | Biathlon | |
| 15 | Uzbekistan | 乌兹别克斯坦 | Wūzībiékèsītǎn | Volunteer | —N/a | |
| 16 | Brazil | 巴西 | Bāxī | Manex Silva | Cross-country skiing | |
| 17 | Pakistan | 巴基斯坦 | Bājīsītǎn | Muhammad Karim | Alpine skiing | |
| 18 | Israel | 以色列 | Yǐsèliè | Volunteer | —N/a | |
| 19 | Timor-Leste | 东帝汶 | Dōngdìwèn | Yohan Goutt Gonçalves | Alpine skiing | |
| 20 | North Macedonia | 北马其顿 | Běimǎqídùn | Volunteer | —N/a | |
| 21 | Luxembourg | 卢森堡 | Lúsēnbǎo | Matthieu Osch | Alpine skiing | |
| 22 | Belarus | 白俄罗斯 | Báiéluósī | Ignat Golovatsiuk | Speed skating | |
| 23 | India | 印度 | Yìndù | Volunteer | —N/a | |
| 24 | Lithuania | 立陶宛 | Lìtáowǎn | Modestas Vaiciulis | Cross-country skiing | |
| 25 | Nigeria | 尼日利亚 | Nírìlìyà | Samuel Ikpefan | Cross-country skiing | |
| 26 | Ghana | 加纳 | Jiānà | Volunteer | —N/a | |
| 27 | Canada | 加拿大 | Jiānádà | Isabelle Weidemann | Speed skating | |
| 28 | San Marino | 圣马力诺 | Shèng Mǎlìnuò | Matteo Gatti | Alpine skiing | |
| 29 | Kyrgyzstan | 吉尔吉斯斯坦 | Jíěrjísīsītǎn | Volunteer | —N/a | |
| 30 | Armenia | 亚美尼亚 | Yàměiníyà | Volunteer | —N/a | |
| 31 | Spain | 西班牙 | Xībānyá | Adrián Díaz | Figure skating | |
| 32 | Liechtenstein | 列支敦士登 | Lièzhīdūnshìdēng | Volunteer | —N/a | |
| 33 | Iran | 伊朗 | Yīlǎng | Volunteer | —N/a | |
| 34 | Hungary | 匈牙利 | Xiōngyálì | Adam Konya | Cross-country skiing | |
| 35 | Iceland | 冰岛 | Bīngdǎo | Snorri Einarsson | Cross-country skiing | |
| 36 | Andorra | 安道尔 | Āndàoěr | Volunteer | —N/a | |
| 37 | Finland | 芬兰 | Fēnlán | Krista Pärmäkoski | Cross-country skiing | |
| 38 | Croatia | 克罗地亚 | Kèluódìyà | Tena Hadzic | Cross-country skiing | |
| 39 | Saudi Arabia | 沙特 | Shātè | Volunteer | —N/a | |
| 40 | Albania | 阿尔巴尼亚 | Āěrbāníyà | Volunteer | —N/a | |
| 41 | Argentina | 阿根廷 | Āgēntíng | Maria Victoria Rodriguez | Speed skating | |
| 42 | Azerbaijan | 阿塞拜疆 | Āsāibàijiāng | Volunteer | —N/a | |
| 43 | Latvia | 拉脱维亚 | Lātuōwéiyà | Matīss Miknis | Bobsleigh | |
| 44 | Great Britain | 英国 | Yīngguó | Bruce Mouat | Curling | |
| 45 | Romania | 罗马尼亚 | Luōmǎníyà | Andreea Grecu | Bobsleigh | |
| 46 | ROC | 罗克 (Note: ROC was sorted under a Chinese transcription of its English abbreviation, 罗克 (Luōkè).) | Luōkè | Alexander Bolshunov | Cross-country skiing | |
| 47 | France | 法国 | Fǎguó | Quentin Fillon Maillet | Biathlon | |
| 48 | Poland | 波兰 | Bōlán | Piotr Michalski | Speed skating | |
| 49 | Puerto Rico | 波多黎各 | Bōduō Lígè | Kellie Delka | Skeleton | |
| 50 | Bosnia and Herzegovina | 波黑 | Bōhēi | Strahinja Erić | Cross-country skiing | |
| 51 | Bolivia | 玻利维亚 | Bōlìwéiyà | Volunteer | —N/a | |
| 52 | Norway | 挪威 | Nuówēi | Marte Olsbu Røiseland | Biathlon | |
| 53 | Kazakhstan | 哈萨克斯坦 | Hāsàkèsītǎn | Abzal Azhgaliyev | Short track speed skating | |
| 54 | Kosovo | 科索沃 | Kēsuǒwò | Volunteer | —N/a | |
| 55 | Bulgaria | 保加利亚 | Bǎojiālìyà | Volunteer | —N/a | |
| 56 | United States | 美国 | Měiguó | Elana Meyers Taylor | Bobsleigh | |
| 57 | American Samoa | 美属萨摩亚 | Měishǔ Sàmóyà | Nathan Crumpton | Skeleton | |
| 58 | Virgin Islands | 美属维尔京群岛 | Měishǔ Wéiěrjīng Qúndǎo | Volunteer | —N/a | |
| 59 | Thailand | 泰国 | Tàiguó | Volunteer | —N/a | |
| 60 | Netherlands | 荷兰 | Hélán | Irene Schouten | Speed skating | |
| 61 | Georgia | 格鲁吉亚 | Gélǔjíyà | Luka Berulava | Figure skating | |
| 62 | Colombia | 哥伦比亚 | Gēlúnbǐyà | Laura Gómez | Speed skating | |
| 63 | Trinidad and Tobago | 特立尼达和多巴哥 | Tèlìnídá hé Duōbāgē | Volunteer | —N/a | |
| 64 | Peru | 秘鲁 | Bìlǔ | Volunteer | —N/a | |
| 65 | Ireland | 爱尔兰 | Aìěrlán | Thomas Maloney Westgård | Cross-country skiing | |
| 66 | Estonia | 爱沙尼亚 | Aìshāníyà | Kelly Sildaru | Freestyle skiing | |
| 67 | Haiti | 海地 | Hǎidì | Richardson Viano | Alpine skiing | |
| 68 | Czech Republic | 捷克 | Jiékè | Martina Sáblíková | Speed skating | |
| 69 | Philippines | 菲律宾 | Fēilǜbīn | Asa Miller | Alpine skiing | |
| 70 | Slovenia | 斯洛文尼亚 | Sīluòwénníyà | Anita Klemenič | Cross-country skiing | |
| 71 | Slovakia | 斯洛伐克 | Sīluòfákè | Peter Cehlárik | Ice hockey | |
| 72 | Portugal | 葡萄牙 | Pútáoyá | Volunteer | —N/a | |
| 73 | South Korea | 韩国 | Hánguó | Cha Min-kyu | Speed skating | |
| 74 | Montenegro | 黑山 | Hēishān | Volunteer | —N/a | |
| 75 | Chile | 智利 | Zhìlì | Volunteer | —N/a | |
| 76 | Austria | 奥地利 | Aòdìlì | Katharina Liensberger | Alpine skiing | |
| 76 | Austria | 奥地利 | Aòdìlì | Johannes Strolz | Alpine skiing | |
| 77 | Switzerland | 瑞士 | Ruìshì | Ryan Regez | Freestyle skiing | |
| 78 | Sweden | 瑞典 | Ruìdiǎn | Elvira Öberg | Biathlon | |
| 79 | Mongolia | 蒙古 | Měnggǔ | Batmönkhiin Achbadrakh | Cross-country skiing | |
| 80 | New Zealand | 新西兰 | Xīn Xīlán | Nico Porteous | Freestyle skiing | |
| 81 | Serbia | 塞尔维亚 | Sàiěrwéiyà | Volunteer | —N/a | |
| 82 | Cyprus | 塞浦路斯 | Sàipǔlùsī | Volunteer | —N/a | |
| 83 | Mexico | 墨西哥 | Mòxīgē | Rodolfo Dickson | Alpine skiing | |
| 84 | Lebanon | 黎巴嫩 | Líbānèn | Volunteer | —N/a | |
| 85 | Germany | 德国 | Déguó | Thorsten Margis | Bobsleigh | |
| 86 | Moldova | 摩尔多瓦 | Móěrduōwǎ | Alina Stremous | Biathlon | |
| 87 | Monaco | 摩纳哥 | Mónàgē | Volunteer | —N/a | |
| 88 | Morocco | 摩洛哥 | Móluògē | Volunteer | —N/a | |
| 89 | Australia | 澳大利亚 | Àodàlìyǎ | Sami Kennedy-Sim | Freestyle skiing | |
| 90 | Italy | 意大利 | Yìdàlì | Francesca Lollobrigida | Speed skating | |
| 91 | China | 中国 | Zhōngguó | Xu Mengtao | Freestyle skiing | |
| 91 | China | 中国 | Zhōngguó | Gao Tingyu | Speed skating | |
