= Speed skating at the 2022 Winter Olympics – Men's 5000 metres =

Men's 5000 metres at the XXIV Olympic Winter Games
- Speed skating
- Venue: National Speed Skating Oval, Beijing
- Date: 6 February 2022
- Competitors: 20 from 12 nations
- Winning time: 6:08.84 OR

Medalists
1st place, gold medalist(s)		Nils van der Poel	Sweden
2nd place, silver medalist(s)		Patrick Roest	Netherlands
3rd place, bronze medalist(s)		Hallgeir Engebråten	Norway

The men's 5000 m competition in speed skating at the 2022 Winter Olympics was held on 6 February, at the National Speed Skating Oval ("Ice Ribbon") in Beijing. The event was won by Nils van der Poel of Sweden. Patrick Roest of the Netherlands won the silver medal, and Hallgeir Engebråten of Norway the bronze medal. For van der Poel and Engebråten these are the first Olympic medals. Van der Poel's medal was the first Olympic medal in speed skating for Sweden since 1988, when Tomas Gustafson won both 5000 m and 10000 m.

The defending champion and the Olympic record holder was Sven Kramer. The silver medalist, Ted-Jan Bloemen, qualified for the Olympics as well. The bronze medalist, Sverre Lunde Pedersen, was not selected to skate at the event. Nils van der Poel is the 2021 World Single Distances champion at the 5000 m distance, with Patrick Roest and Sergey Trofimov being the silver and bronze medalist, respectively. Van der Poel was also the world record holder at the start of the Olympics. He was leading the 2021–22 ISU Speed Skating World Cup at long distances with four races completed before the Olympics, followed by Bloemen and Davide Ghiotto. Van der Poel's world record, 6:01.56 in Salt Lake City on 3 December 2021, was thus the season best time.

Sven Kramer was skating in the first pair and set the lead in the event. In pair 3, Hallgeir Engebråten improved Kramer's time by over 7 seconds, 0.12 seconds short of Kramer's Olympic record, and Sergey Trofimov became second. In pair 5, Patrick Roest, skating essentially alone, since his competitor was far behind, took the lead, setting a new Olympic record. This situation remained until the last pair, when Nils van der Poel, skating behind the Roest's scheme most of the distance, caught up at the last kilometer and became the champion with the new Olympic record.

In the flower ceremony after the race, the three medalists were handed an olympic mascot to take themselves from a board held by Jan Dijkema, President of the International Skating Union, dressed in face mask due to the ongoing pandemic. The medal ceremony was scheduled for the day after the race.

== Qualification ==
A total of 20 entry quotas were available for the event, with a maximum of three athletes per NOC. The first 14 athletes qualified through their performance at the 2021–22 ISU Speed Skating World Cup, while the last six earned quotas by having the best times among athletes not already qualified. A country could only earn the maximum three spots through the World Cup rankings.

The qualification time for the event (6:30.00) was released on July 1, 2021, and was unchanged from 2018. Skaters had the time period of July 1, 2021 – January 16, 2022 to achieve qualification times at valid International Skating Union (ISU) events.

== Records ==
Prior to this competition, the existing world and Olympic records were as follows.

World record	Nils van der Poel (SWE)	6:01.56	Salt Lake City, United States	3 December 2021
Olympic record	Sven Kramer (NED)	6:09.76	Gangneung, South Korea	11 February 2018
Track record	Hanahati Muhamaiti (CHN)	6:37.80		7 April 2021

A new Olympic record was set in the competition.

Date	Round	Athlete	Country	Time	Record
6 February	Pair 10	Nils van der Poel	Sweden	6:08.84	OR, TR

== Results ==
The races were started at 16:30.

Rank	Pair	Lane	Name	Country	Time	Time behind	Notes
1st place, gold medalist(s)	10	I	Nils van der Poel	Sweden	6:08.84		OR
2nd place, silver medalist(s)	5	O	Patrick Roest	Netherlands	6:09.31	+0.47	
3rd place, bronze medalist(s)	3	O	Hallgeir Engebråten	Norway	6:09.88	+1.04	
4	3	I	Sergey Trofimov	ROC	6:10.27	+1.43	
5	6	I	Jorrit Bergsma	Netherlands	6:13.18	+4.34	
6	8	I	Aleksandr Rumyantsev	ROC	6.15.02	+6.18	
7	10	O	Bart Swings	Belgium	6:16.90	+8.06	
8	8	O	Davide Ghiotto	Italy	6:16.92	+8.08	
9	1	I	Sven Kramer	Netherlands	6:17.04	+8.20	
10	9	O	Ted-Jan Bloemen	Canada	6:19.11	+10.27	
11	7	I	Patrick Beckert	Germany	6:19.58	+10.74	
12	6	O	Seitaro Ichinohe	Japan	6:19.81	+10.97	
13	2	O	Felix Rijhnen	Germany	6:19.86	+11.02	
14	9	I	Ruslan Zakharov	ROC	6:21.00	+12.16	
15	7	O	Michele Malfatti	Italy	6:21.47	+12.63	
16	2	I	Emery Lehman	United States	6:21.80	+12.96	
17	4	O	Ethan Cepuran	United States	6:25.97	+17.13	
18	4	I	Livio Wenger	Switzerland	6:27.01	+18.17	
19	1	O	Viktor Hald Thorup	Denmark	6:28.87	+20.03	
20	5	I	Andrea Giovannini	Italy	6:30.11	+21.27	
