= Speed skating at the 2022 Winter Olympics – Women's 1500 metres =

Speed skating event at the 2022 Winter Olympics

Women's 1500 metres at the XXIV Olympic Winter Games
- Speed skating
- Venue: National Speed Skating Oval, Beijing
- Date: 7 February 2022
- Competitors: 30 from 16 nations
- Winning time: 1:53.28

Medalists
1st place, gold medalist(s)		Ireen Wüst	Netherlands
2nd place, silver medalist(s)		Miho Takagi	Japan
3rd place, bronze medalist(s)		Antoinette de Jong	Netherlands

The women's 1500 m competition in speed skating at the 2022 Winter Olympics was held on 7 February, at the National Speed Skating Oval ("Ice Ribbon") in Beijing. Ireen Wüst of the Netherlands won the distance. She set a new Olympic record and won her sixth Olympic gold medal, thereby becoming the first person to win individual gold medals at five different Olympics. Miho Takagi of Japan won silver, and Antoinette de Jong of the Netherlands bronze.

The defending champion was Wüst, who was also the 2010 champion, the 2014 silver medalist, and the 2018 champion. The world record holder, Takagi, was also competing. The bronze medalist, Marrit Leenstra, retired from competitions. Ragne Wiklund was the 2021 World Single Distances champion at the 1500 m distance. Brittany Bowe and Evgeniia Lalenkova were the silver and bronze medalist, respectively. Ayano Sato was leading the 2021–22 ISU Speed Skating World Cup at the 1500 m distance with four races completed before the Olympics, followed by Bowe and Takagi. Takagi skated the season best time, 1:49.99 in Salt Lake City on 5 December 2021.

== Qualification ==
A total of 30 entry quotas were available for the event, with a maximum of three athletes per NOC. The first 20 athletes qualified through their performance at the 2021–22 ISU Speed Skating World Cup, while the last ten earned quotas by having the best times among athletes not already qualified. A country could only earn the maximum three spots through the World Cup rankings.

The qualification time for the event (1:59.50) was released on July 1, 2021, and was unchanged from 2018. Skaters had the time period of July 1, 2021 – January 16, 2022 to achieve qualification times at valid International Skating Union (ISU) events.

== Records ==
Prior to this competition, the existing world, Olympic and track records were as follows.

World record	Miho Takagi (JPN)	1:49.83	Salt Lake City, United States	10 March 2019
Olympic record	Jorien ter Mors (NED)	1:53.51	Sochi, Russia	16 February 2014
Track record	Yin Qi (CHN)	2:00.43		10 April 2021

A new Olympic record was set in the competition.

Date	Round	Athlete	Country	Time	Record
7 February	Pair 12	Ireen Wüst	Netherlands	1:53.28	OR, TR

== Results ==
The races were started at 16:30.

Rank	Pair	Lane	Name	Country	Time	Time behind	Notes
1st place, gold medalist(s)	12	I	Ireen Wüst	Netherlands	1:53.28		OR
2nd place, silver medalist(s)	15	O	Miho Takagi	Japan	1:53.72	+0.44	
3rd place, bronze medalist(s)	11	I	Antoinette de Jong	Netherlands	1:54.82	+1.54	
4	13	I	Ayano Sato	Japan	1:54.92	+1.64	
5	9	I	Marijke Groenewoud	Netherlands	1:54.97	+1.69	
6	13	O	Francesca Lollobrigida	Italy	1:55.20	+1.92	
7	15	I	Elizaveta Golubeva	ROC	1:55.30	+2.02	
8	10	O	Nana Takagi	Japan	1:55.34	+2.06	
9	7	I	Evgeniia Lalenkova	ROC	1:55.74	+2.46	
10	14	I	Brittany Bowe	United States	1:55.81	+2.53	
11	10	I	Han Mei	China	1:56.08	+2.80	
12	14	O	Ragne Wiklund	Norway	1:56.46	+3.18	
13	12	O	Ivanie Blondin	Canada	1:56.49	+3.21	
14	11	O	Nadezhda Morozova	Kazakhstan	1:56.85	+3.57	
15	9	O	Yin Qi	China	1:57.00	+3.72	
16	4	O	Ekaterina Sloeva	Belarus	1:58.41	+5.13	
17	6	O	Adake Ahenaer	China	1:58.59	+5.31	
18	7	O	Yekaterina Aidova	Kazakhstan	1:59.01	+5.73	
19	8	O	Natalia Czerwonka	Poland	1:59.03	+5.75	
20	5	I	Mia Kilburg	United States	1:59.11	+5.83	
21	8	I	Nikola Zdráhalová	Czech Republic	1:59.54	+6.26	
22	4	I	Elena Sokhryakova	ROC	1:59.58	+6.30	
23	5	O	Maryna Zuyeva	Belarus	1:59.82	+6.54	
24	6	I	Maddison Pearman	Canada	1:59.89	+6.61	
25	3	O	Michelle Uhrig	Germany	2:00.20	+6.92	
26	1	O	Huang Yu-ting	Chinese Taipei	2:00.78	+7.50	
27	1	I	Ellia Smeding	Great Britain	2:01.09	+7.81	
28	3	I	Sofie Karoline Haugen	Norway	2:01.57	+8.29	
29	2	I	Sandrine Tas	Belgium	2:03.39	+10.11	
30	2	O	Magdalena Czyszczoń	Poland	2:05.64	+12.36	
