= Beijing National Speed Skating Oval =

Speed skating arena in Beijing

National Speed Skating Oval
- 国家速滑馆
- The Ice Ribbon
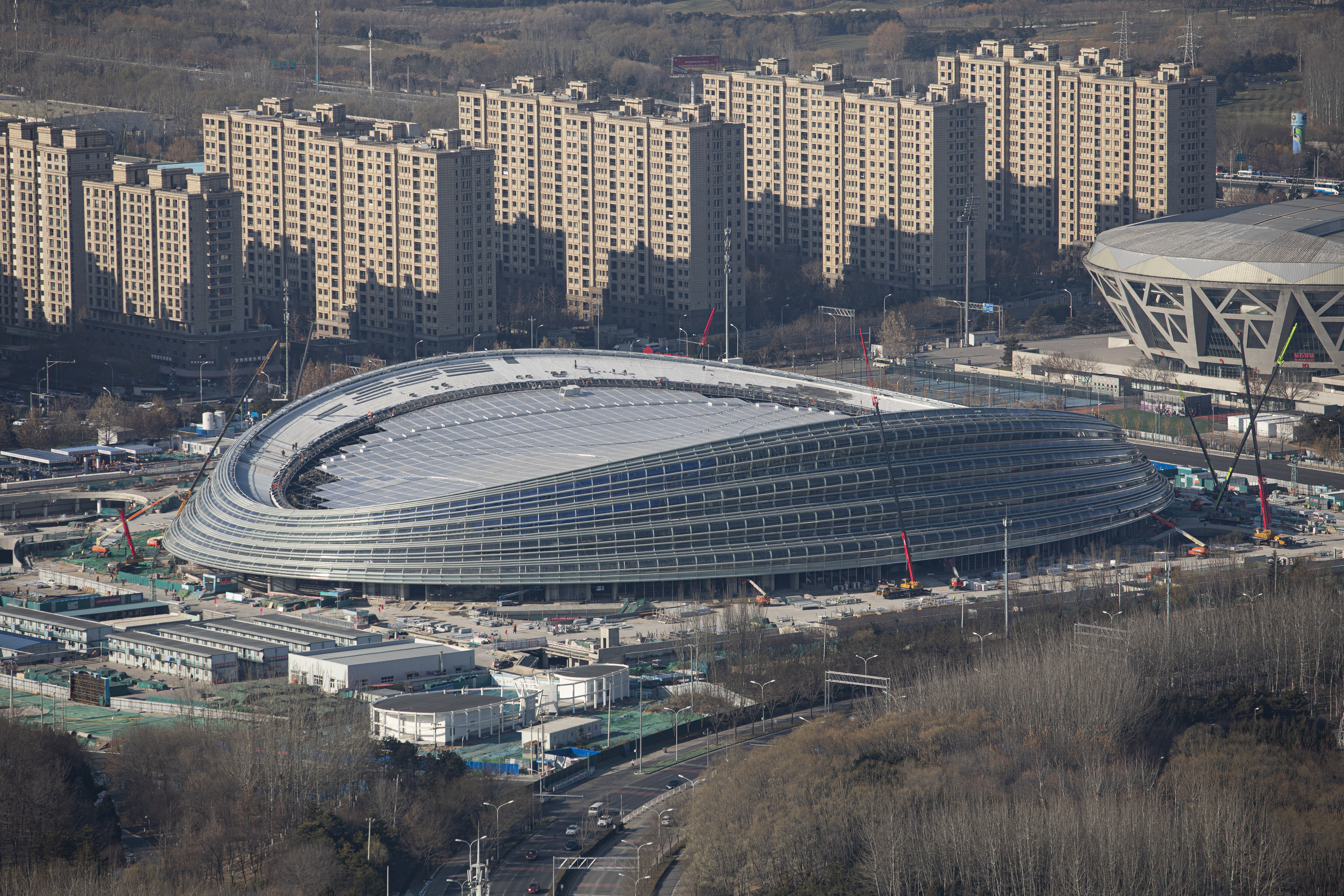
- National Speed Skating Oval (2019)
- Interactive map of National Speed Skating Oval
- Location: Olympic Green, Chaoyang District, Beijing, China
- Coordinates: 40°0′57.21″N 116°22′17.09″E
- Capacity: 5,200 seats (temporary); 6,800 (permanent)
- Public transit: 8 Lincuiqiao station

Construction
- Groundbreaking: April 2017; 9 years ago
- Opened: 8 October 2021; 4 years ago
- Architects: Populous; Beijing Institute of Architectural Design

Tenant
- 2022 Winter Olympics

The National Speed Skating Oval (The Ice Ribbon) is a speed skating arena which is the only new venue built on Beijing's Olympic Green for the Winter Olympics. It hosted the speed skating competitions at the 2022 Winter Olympics. It was built on the location of the former Olympic Green Hockey Field used for field hockey event and the Olympic Green Archery Field used for the archery event.

It can accommodate 12,000 spectators (6,800 permanent and 5,200 temporary seats) according to the bid book. After the games it is foreseen to use it as a public skating venue and for ice hockey clubs.

Designed by Populous and Beijing Institute of Architectural Design, construction began in mid-2017, and was completed in 2019. First competition was held on 8 October 2021. It has an area of 12,000 square meters, being the largest speed skating venue in Asia. The facade is highlighted by 22 "ice ribbon" with a length of 622 meters each. The second floor has a Temple of Heaven-inspired curved curtain wall system.

== Technologies ==
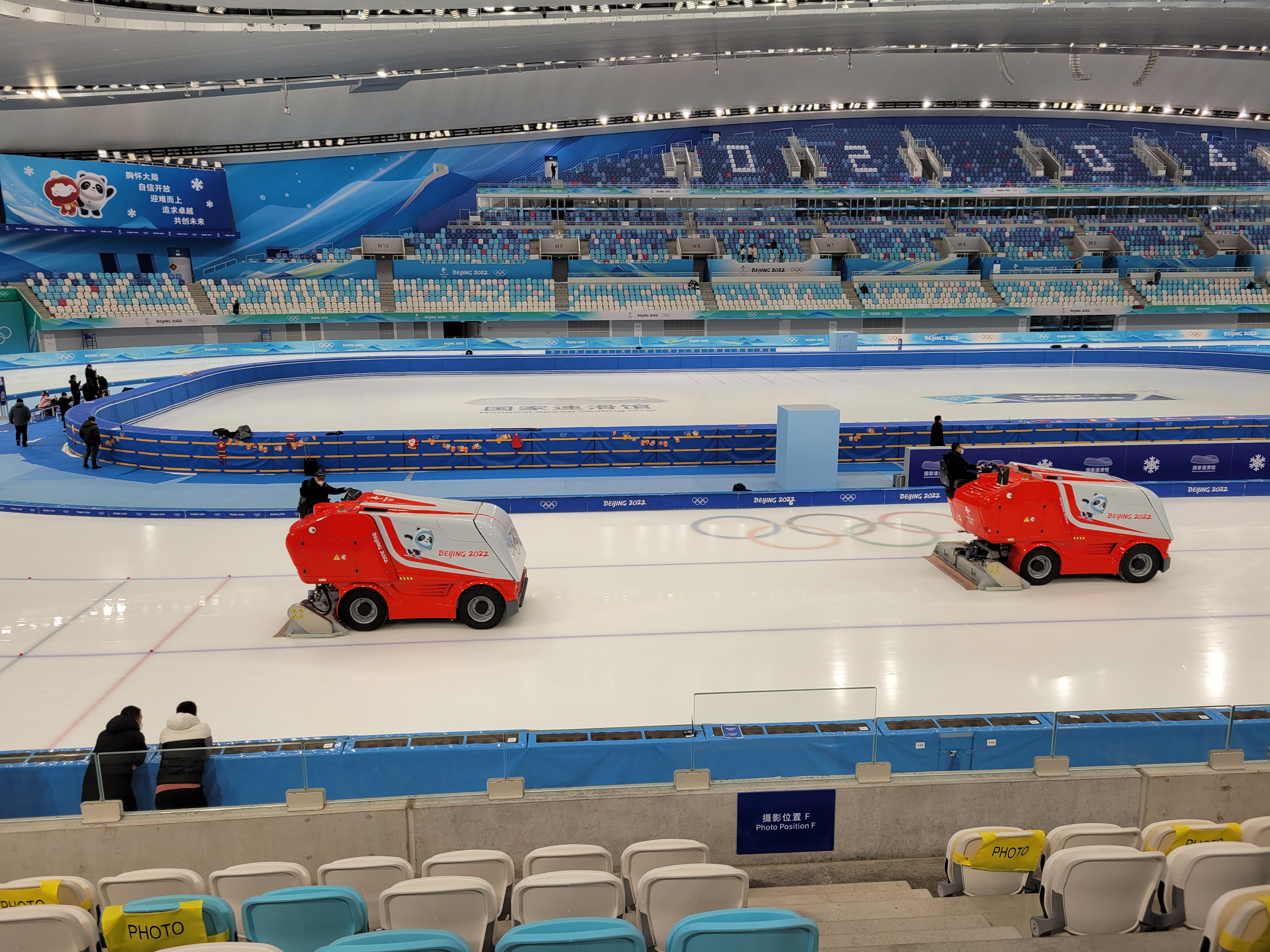
Inside the National Speed Skating Oval

This Olympic venue is one of the few large-size ice arenas in the world that uses CO_{2} refrigerant. CO_{2} is used as both refrigerant in cooling system and secondary refrigerant in cooling distribution system, including the rink pipes. The arena has been completed with a heat recovery function, that can cover arena heating demands like ventilation, air dehumidification, hot water production, etc. The refrigeration CO_{2} rack, including cooling machines, has 4 MW max cooling capacity.

== Track records ==
=== Men ===
Event	Time	Name	Country	Date	Meet	Ref
500 metres	34.27	Jordan Stolz	United States	29 November 2024	World Cup	
1000 metres	1:07.62	Jordan Stolz	United States	30 November 2024	World Cup	
1500 metres	1:43.21	Kjeld Nuis	Netherlands	8 February 2022	Olympic Games	
5000 metres	6.08.84	Nils van der Poel	Sweden	6 February 2022	Olympic Games	
10000 metres	12:30.74	Nils van der Poel	Sweden	11 February 2022	Olympic Games	
Team pursuit (8 laps)	3:36.62	Daniil Aldoshkin; Sergey Trofimov; Ruslan Zakharov	ROC	15 February 2022	Olympic Games	

=== Women ===
Event	Time	Name	Country	Date	Meet	Ref
500 metres	37.04	Erin Jackson	United States	13 February 2022	Olympic Games	
1000 metres	1:13.19	Miho Takagi	Japan	17 February 2022	Olympic Games	
1500 metres	1:53.28	Ireen Wüst	Netherlands	7 February 2022	Olympic Games	
3000 metres	3:56.93	Irene Schouten	Netherlands	5 February 2022	Olympic Games	
5000 metres	6:43.51	Irene Schouten	Netherlands	10 February 2022	Olympic Games	
Team pursuit (6 laps)	2.53.44	Ivanie Blondin; Valérie Maltais; Isabelle Weidemann	Canada	15 February 2022	Olympic Games	
