= Dzmitry Lazouski =

Belarusian biathlete (born 1998)

Personal information
- Nationality: Belarusian
- Born: 9 September 1998 (age 27) Minsk, Belarus
- Height: 1.88 m (6 ft 2 in)

Sport
- Sport: Skiing

World Cup career
- Team podiums: 1

Dzmitry Lazouski (born 9 September 1998) is a Belarusian biathlete who represented Belarus at the 2022 Winter Olympics. His first world cup podium finish was in 2022 for the men's 4x7.5 km relay event at Ruhpolding.

== Biathlon results ==
All results are sourced from the International Biathlon Union.

=== Olympic Games ===
0 medals

| Event | Individual | Sprint | Pursuit | Mass start | Relay | Mixed relay |
|---|---|---|---|---|---|---|
| (China) 2022 Beijing | 58th | 78th | — | — | 8th | — |

=== World Championships ===
0 medals

| Event | Individual | Sprint | Pursuit | Mass start | Relay | Mixed relay | Single mixed relay |
|---|---|---|---|---|---|---|---|
| (Slovenia) 2021 Pokljuka | — | 85th | — | — | 9th | — | — |

*During Olympic seasons competitions are only held for those events not included in the Olympic program.
