= Netherlands at the 2022 Winter Olympics =

- Flag of the Netherlands
- IOC code: NED
- NOC: Dutch Olympic Committee*; Dutch Sports Federation
- Website: www.nocnsf.nl/en

in Beijing, China 4–20 February 2022
- Competitors: 41 (21 men and 20 women) in 7 sports
- Flag bearers (opening): Kjeld Nuis; Lindsay van Zundert
- Flag bearer (closing): Irene Schouten
- Officials: Carl Verheijen, Head of mission
- Medals Ranked 6th: Gold 8 Silver 5 Bronze 4 Total 17

Winter Olympics appearances (overview)
- 1928; 1932; 1936; 1948; 1952; 1956; 1960; 1964; 1968; 1972; 1976; 1980; 1984; 1988; 1992; 1994; 1998; 2002; 2006; 2010; 2014; 2018; 2022; 2026

The Netherlands competed at the 2022 Winter Olympics in Beijing, China, from 4 to 20 February 2022.

The Netherlands won eight gold medals at these Games, matching their gold medal hauls from 2014 and 2018, although the total number of medals won decreased from 24 in 2014 to 20 in 2018 and 17 in 2022.

Speed skater Irene Schouten was the flagbearer during the closing ceremony.

== Medalists ==
The following Dutch competitors won medals at the games. In the discipline sections below, the medalists' names are bolded.

Medal	Name	Sport	Event	Date
Gold	Irene Schouten	Speed skating	Women's 3000 metres	5 February
Gold	Ireen Wüst	Speed skating	Women's 1500 metres	7 February
Gold	Kjeld Nuis	Speed skating	Men's 1500 metres	8 February
Gold	Irene Schouten	Speed skating	Women's 5000 metres	10 February
Gold	Suzanne Schulting	Short track speed skating	Women's 1000 metres	11 February
Gold	Suzanne Schulting; Selma Poutsma; Xandra Velzeboer; Yara van Kerkhof	Short track speed skating	Women's 3000 metre relay	13 February
Gold	Thomas Krol	Speed skating	Men's 1000 metres	18 February
Gold	Irene Schouten	Speed skating	Women's mass start	19 February
Silver	Patrick Roest	Speed skating	Men's 5000 metres	6 February
Silver	Patrick Roest	Speed skating	Men's 10,000 metres	11 February
Silver	Suzanne Schulting	Short track speed skating	Women's 500 metres	7 February
Silver	Thomas Krol	Speed skating	Men's 1500 metres	8 February
Silver	Jutta Leerdam	Speed skating	Women's 1000 metres	17 February
Bronze	Antoinette de Jong	Speed skating	Women's 1500 metres	7 February
Bronze	Kimberley Bos	Skeleton	Women's	12 February
Bronze	Marijke Groenewoud; Antoinette de Jong; Irene Schouten; Ireen Wüst	Speed skating	Women's team pursuit	15 February
Bronze	Suzanne Schulting	Short track speed skating	Women's 1500 metres	16 February

**Medals by sport**
**Sport**	1st place, gold medalist(s)	2nd place, silver medalist(s)	3rd place, bronze medalist(s)	**Total**
Speed skating	6	4	2	**12**
Short track	2	1	1	**4**
Skeleton	0	0	1	**1**
**Total**	**8**	**5**	**4**	**17**

**Medals by date**
**Day**	**Date**	1st place, gold medalist(s)	2nd place, silver medalist(s)	3rd place, bronze medalist(s)	Total
Day 1	February 5	1	0	0	1
Day 2	February 6	0	1	0	1
Day 3	February 7	1	1	1	3
Day 4	February 8	1	1	0	2
Day 5	February 9	0	0	0	0
Day 6	February 10	1	0	0	1
Day 7	February 11	1	1	0	2
Day 8	February 12	0	0	1	1
Day 9	February 13	1	0	0	1
Day 10	February 14	0	0	0	0
Day 11	February 15	0	0	1	1
Day 12	February 16	0	0	1	1
Day 13	February 17	0	1	0	1
Day 14	February 18	1	0	0	1
Day 15	February 19	1	0	0	1
Day 16	February 20	0	0	0	0

== Competitors ==
The following is the list of number of competitors participating at the Games per sport/discipline.

Sport	Men	Women	Total
Alpine skiing	1	1	2
Bobsleigh	4	1	5
Figure skating	0	1	1
Short track speed skating	5	5	10
Skeleton	0	1	1
Snowboarding	2	2	4
Speed skating	9	9	18
Total	21	20	41

== Alpine skiing ==
By meeting the basic qualification standards The Netherlands qualified one male and one female alpine skier.

Athlete	Event	Run 1		Run 2		Total	
Athlete	Event	Time	Rank	Time	Rank	Time	Rank
Maarten Meiners	Men's giant slalom	1:06.03	22	1:09.45	20	2:15.48	18
Adriana Jelinkova	Women's giant slalom	DNF		Did not advance			
Adriana Jelinkova	Women's slalom	Did not start					

== Bobsleigh ==
The Netherlands qualified three sleds (two-man, four-man and women's monobob) over the course of the 2021–22 Bobsleigh World Cup.

Athlete	Event	Run 1		Run 2		Run 3		Run 4		Total	
Athlete	Event	Time	Rank	Time	Rank	Time	Rank	Time	Rank	Time	Rank
Ivo de Bruin; Jelen Franjic	Two-man	1:00.46	27	1:00.36	18	1:00.35	20	Did not advance		3:01.17	23
Ivo de Bruin; Janko Franjic; Jelen Franjic; Dennis Veenker	Four-man	59.85	26	1:00.07	24	1:00.08	26	Did not advance		3:00.00	26
Karlien Sleper	Women's monobob	1:05.88	16	1:06.59	16	1:05.85	11	1:06.65	18	4:24.97	16

== Figure skating ==
In the 2021 World Figure Skating Championships in Stockholm, Sweden, the Netherlands secured one quota in the ladies singles competition.

Athlete	Event	SP		FS		Total	
Athlete	Event	Points	Rank	Points	Rank	Points	Rank
Lindsay van Zundert	Women's singles	59.24	22	116.57	16	175.81	18

== Short track speed skating ==
The Netherlands qualified all three relays and the maximum of five athletes in each gender.

Men

Athlete	Event	Heat		Quarterfinal		Semifinal		Final	
Athlete	Event	Time	Rank	Time	Rank	Time	Rank	Time	Rank
Itzhak de Laat	500 m	No Time	4	Did not advance					=28
Dylan Hoogerwerf	500 m	No Time	4	Did not advance					=28
Jens van 't Wout	500 m	PEN	Did not advance						
Itzhak de Laat	1000 m	1:24.332	3 AA	1:42.490	3 AA	1:24.229	3 FB	1:35.925	5
Sjinkie Knegt	1000 m	1:23.097	2 Q	YC	5	Disqualified			
Jens van 't Wout	1000 m	1:23.946	3	Did not advance					19
Sjinkie Knegt	1500 m	—N/a		2:12.208	1 Q	PEN	7	Did not advance	20
Sven Roes	1500 m	—N/a		2:18.687	2 Q	2:10.841	4 FB	2:18.299	14
Itzhak de Laat	1500 m	—N/a		3:08.907	5	Did not advance			30
Itzhak de Laat; Sjinkie Knegt; Sven Roes; Jens van 't Wout	5000 m relay	—N/a				6:37.927	3 FB	6:39.780	7

Women

Athlete	Event	Heat		Quarterfinal		Semifinal		Final	
Athlete	Event	Time	Rank	Time	Rank	Time	Rank	Time	Rank
Selma Poutsma	500 m	43.472	1 Q	1:07.285	4	Did not advance			15
Suzanne Schulting	500 m	42.379 OR	1 Q	42.922	1 Q	42.475	1 FA	42.559	2nd place, silver medalist(s)
Xandra Velzeboer	500 m	42.563	1 Q	PEN	5	Did not advance			16
Selma Poutsma	1000 m	1:28.115	2 Q	1:29.09	3	Did not advance			14
Suzanne Schulting	1000 m	1:27.292 OR	1 Q	1:26.514 WR	1 Q	1:28.10	1 FA	1:28.391	1st place, gold medalist(s)
Xandra Velzeboer	1000 m	1:30.454	2 Q	1:26.592	2 Q	1:27.80	5 FB	1:29.668	5
Suzanne Schulting	1500 m	—N/a		2:18.810	1 Q	2:18.942	1 FA	2:17.865	3rd place, bronze medalist(s)
Xandra Velzeboer	1500 m	—N/a		2:21.148	2 Q	2:18.303	3 FA	2:18.781	5
Rianne de Vries	1500 m	—N/a		2:22.244	4 ADV	2:18.712	5	Did not advance	16
Selma Poutsma; Suzanne Schulting; Yara van Kerkhof; Xandra Velzeboer	3000 m relay	—N/a				4:03.409	1 FA	4:04.133 OR	1st place, gold medalist(s)

Mixed

Athlete	Event	Quarterfinal		Semifinal		Final	
Athlete	Event	Time	Rank	Time	Rank	Time	Rank
Itzhak de Laat; Sjinkie Knegt; Selma Poutsma; Suzanne Schulting; Jens van 't Wout; Xandra Velzeboer	2000 m relay	2:36.437 OR	1 Q	2:51.919	4 FB	2:36.966	4

Key: AA = Advanced to medal round due to being impeded by another skater; DNF = Did not finish; FA = Qualified to medal round; FB = Qualified to consolation round; PEN = Penalty; Q = Qualified to next round

== Skeleton ==
The Netherlands qualified one female skeleton racer over the course of the 2021–22 Skeleton World Cup.

Athlete	Event	Run 1		Run 2		Run 3		Run 4		Total	
Athlete	Event	Time	Rank	Time	Rank	Time	Rank	Time	Rank	Time	Rank
Kimberley Bos	Women's	1:02.51	10	1:02.22	2	1:01.86	4	1:01.87	2	4:08.46	3rd place, bronze medalist(s)

== Snowboarding ==
The Netherlands have qualified for 4 quota places (2 men, 2 women) racer over the course of the 2021–22 Snowboard World Cup.

Freestyle

Athlete	Event	Qualification					Final				
Athlete	Event	Run 1	Run 2	Run 3	Best/Total	Rank	Run 1	Run 2	Run 3	Best/Total	Rank
Niek van der Velden	Men's slopestyle	26.51	46.03	—N/a	46.03	22	did not advance				
Niek van der Velden	Men's big air	79.00	~~60.00~~	63.75	142.75	11	83.75	78.25	~~26.75~~	162.00	6
Melissa Peperkamp	Women's slopestyle	61.26	60.18	—N/a	61.26	13	did not advance				
Melissa Peperkamp	Women's big air	60.00	68.25	~~58.00~~	128.25	11	~~64.25~~	72.00	69.75	141.75	6

Parallel

Athlete	Event	Qualification		Round of 16	Quarterfinal	Semifinal	Final / BM	
Athlete	Event	Time	Rank	Opposition Time	Opposition Time	Opposition Time	Opposition Time	Rank
Michelle Dekker	Women's giant slalom	1:28.73	13 Q	Nadyrshina (ROC); W +0.03	Dujmovits (AUT); W +4.29	Ledecká (CZE); L DNF	Kotnik (SLO); L DNF	4

Snowboard cross

Athlete	Event	Seeding		1/8 final	Quarterfinal	Semifinal	Final	
Athlete	Event	Time	Rank	Position	Position	Position	Position	Rank
Glenn de Blois	Men's	1:19.69	27 Q	4	Did not advance			28

== Speed skating ==
The Dutch Olympic Committee selected the maximum allowed delegation of nine men and nine women, largely based on the results of the Olympic qualification tournament, held in December 2021.

Men

Athlete	Event	Race	
Athlete	Event	Time	Rank
Jorrit Bergsma	5000 m	6:13.18	5
Jorrit Bergsma	10000 m	12:48.94	4
Marcel Bosker	1500 m	1:45.42	9
Sven Kramer	5000 m	6:17.04	9
Thomas Krol	500 m	35.06	18
Thomas Krol	1000 m	1:07.92	1st place, gold medalist(s)
Thomas Krol	1500 m	1:43.55	2nd place, silver medalist(s)
Kjeld Nuis	1500 m	1:43.21 OR	1st place, gold medalist(s)
Hein Otterspeer	1000 m	1:08.80	10
Patrick Roest	5000 m	6:09.31	2nd place, silver medalist(s)
Patrick Roest	10000 m	12:44.59	2nd place, silver medalist(s)
Merijn Scheperkamp	500 m	34.736	12
Kai Verbij	500 m	34.87	14
Kai Verbij	1000 m	1:14.17	30

Women

Athlete	Event	Race	
Athlete	Event	Time	Rank
Carlijn Achtereekte	3000 m	4:02.21	7
Marijke Groenewoud	1500 m	1:54.97	5
Sanne in 't Hof	5000 m	6:59.77	7
Antoinette de Jong	1000 m	1:14.92	5
Antoinette de Jong	1500 m	1:54.82	3rd place, bronze medalist(s)
Antoinette de Jong	3000 m	4:02.37	8
Michelle de Jong	500 m	37.97	13
Femke Kok	500 m	37.39	6
Jutta Leerdam	500 m	37.34	5
Jutta Leerdam	1000 m	1:13.83	2nd place, silver medalist(s)
Irene Schouten	3000 m	3:56.93 OR	1st place, gold medalist(s)
Irene Schouten	5000 m	6:43.51 OR	1st place, gold medalist(s)
Ireen Wüst	1000 m	1:15.11	6
Ireen Wüst	1500 m	1:53.28 OR	1st place, gold medalist(s)

Mass start

Athlete	Event	Semifinal			Final		
Athlete	Event	Points	Time	Rank	Points	Time	Rank
Jorrit Bergsma	Men's mass start	3	7:44.42	8 Q	3	7:50.25	9
Sven Kramer	Men's mass start	3	7:58.22	7 Q	0	7:13.37	16
Irene Schouten	Women's mass start	13	8:34.43	4 Q	60	8:14.73	1st place, gold medalist(s)
Marijke Groenewoud	Women's mass start	9	8:30.92	5 Q	1	9:12.86	11

Team pursuit

Athlete	Event	Quarterfinal		Semifinal		Final	
Athlete	Event	Opposition Time	Rank	Opposition Time	Rank	Opposition Time	Rank
Marcel Bosker; Sven Kramer; Patrick Roest	Men's team pursuit	Canada; W 3:38.90	4 Q	Norway; L 3:39.62	2 FB	United States; L 3:41.62	4
Marijke Groenewoud; Antoinette de Jong; Irene Schouten; Ireen Wüst	Women's team pursuit	Norway; W 2:57.26	3 Q	Canada; L 2:55.93	2 FB	ROC; W 2:56.86	3rd place, bronze medalist(s)

Key: FA = Qualified to gold medal round; FB = Qualified to bronze medal round; L = Lost; OR = Olympic record; Q = Qualified to next round; W = Won
