= 2022 Winter Olympics medal table =

2022 Winter Olympics medals
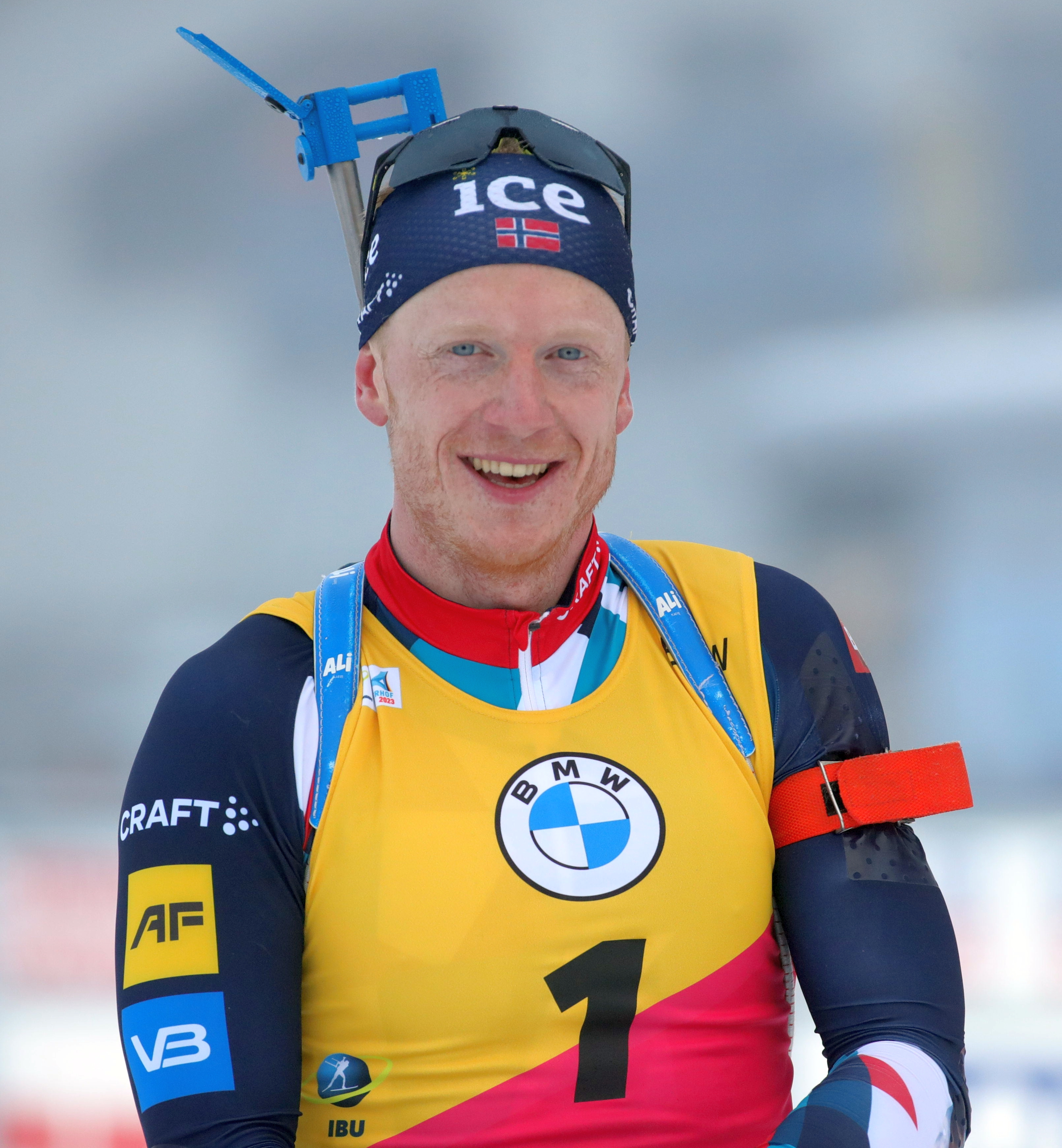
- Johannes Thingnes Bø (pictured) tied with Quentin Fillon Maillet, Marte Olsbu Røiseland, and Alexander Bolshunov for most overall medals won at the 2022 Winter Olympics at five apiece. Bø led the gold medal count with four.
- Location: Beijing, China

Highlights
- Most gold medals: Norway (16)
- Most total medals: Norway (37)
- Medalling NOCs: 29

World map showing the medal achievements of each country during the 2022 Winter Olympics. Legend: represents countries that won at least one gold medal. represents countries that won at least one silver medal but no gold medals. represents countries that won only at least one bronze medal. represents countries that did not win any medals.

The 2022 Winter Olympics, officially known as the XXIV Olympic Winter Games, were a winter multi-sport event held in Beijing, China, from 31 January to 20 February. A total of 2,871 athletes from 91 nations participated in 109 medal events in seven sports across 15 disciplines.

Overall 29 nations received at least one medal, and 23 of them won at least one gold medal. Athletes from Norway won the most medals overall, with 37, and the most gold medals, with 16. The latter record was the highest gold medal tally at a single Winter Games. Host nation China won nine gold medals surpassing its gold medal tally of five at the 2010 winter edition. Athletes from that nation also won 15 medals overall, which eclipsed its record of 11 at both the 2006 and 2010 winter editions.

Biathletes Johannes Thingnes Bø, Quentin Fillon Maillet, and Marte Olsbu Røiseland, and cross-country skier Alexander Bolshunov won the most total medals at the games with five each. Bø also earned the most gold medals with four. Snowboarder Zoi Sadowski-Synnott of New Zealand won the first Winter Olympic gold medal for that nation. Germany achieved a podium sweep in the men's two-man bobsleigh competition with Francesco Friedrich and Thorsten Margis winning gold, Johannes Lochner and Florian Bauer earning silver, and Christoph Hafer and Matthias Sommer attaining bronze.

== Medal table ==
The medal table is based on information provided by the International Olympic Committee (IOC) and is consistent with IOC conventional sorting in its published medal tables. The table uses the Olympic medal table sorting method. By default, the table is ordered by the number of gold medals the athletes from a nation have won, where a nation is an entity represented by a NOC. The number of silver medals is taken into consideration next and then the number of bronze medals. If teams are still tied, equal ranking is given and they are listed alphabetically by their IOC country code.

Two bronze medals were awarded to Daniela Maier and Fanny Smith for a third-place tie in the freestyle women's ski cross event following a decision by the Court of Arbitration for Sport.

Key

‡ Changes in medal standings (see below)

* Host nation (China)

2022 Winter Olympics medal table
Rank	NOC	Gold	Silver	Bronze	Total
1	Norway	16	8	13	37
2	Germany	12	10	5	27
3	United States‡	9	9	7	25
4	China*	9	4	2	15
5	Sweden	8	5	5	18
6	Netherlands	8	5	4	17
7	Austria	7	7	4	18
8	Switzerland	7	2	6	15
9	ROC‡	5	12	15	32
10	France	5	7	2	14
11	Canada	4	8	14	26
12	Japan‡	3	7	8	18
13	Italy	2	7	8	17
14	South Korea	2	5	2	9
15	Slovenia	2	3	2	7
16	Finland	2	2	4	8
17	New Zealand	2	1	0	3
18	Australia	1	2	1	4
19	Great Britain	1	1	0	2
20	Hungary	1	0	2	3
21	Belgium	1	0	1	2
21	Czech Republic	1	0	1	2
21	Slovakia	1	0	1	2
24	Belarus	0	2	0	2
25	Spain	0	1	0	1
25	Ukraine	0	1	0	1
27	Estonia	0	0	1	1
27	Latvia	0	0	1	1
27	Poland	0	0	1	1
Totals (29 entries)		109	109	110	328

== Changes in medal standings ==
Changes in medals glossary
Key
Color/Symbol	Meaning
§	Athlete whose medal was downgraded
※	Disqualified athlete

List of official changes in medal standings
Ruling date	Sport/Event	Athlete (NOC)	1st place, gold medalist(s)	2nd place, silver medalist(s)	3rd place, bronze medalist(s)	Total	Notes
29 January 2024	Figure skating Team event	ROC Mark Kondratiuk § Kamila Valieva ※ Anastasia Mishina § Aleksandr Galliamov § Victoria Sinitsina § Nikita Katsalapov §	-1		+1	0	On 29 January 2024, the Court of Arbitration for Sport (CAS) disqualified Kamila Valieva for four years retroactive to 25 December 2021 for an anti-doping rule violation. On 30 January 2024, the ISU re-allocated medals in the figure skating team event, upgrading the United States to gold and Japan to silver while downgrading the Russian Olympic Committee (ROC) to bronze.
29 January 2024	Figure skating Team event	United States Nathan Chen; Vincent Zhou; Karen Chen; Alexa Knierim; Brandon Frazier; Madison Hubbell; Zachary Donohue; Madison Chock; Evan Bates	+1	-1		0	On 29 January 2024, the Court of Arbitration for Sport (CAS) disqualified Kamila Valieva for four years retroactive to 25 December 2021 for an anti-doping rule violation. On 30 January 2024, the ISU re-allocated medals in the figure skating team event, upgrading the United States to gold and Japan to silver while downgrading the Russian Olympic Committee (ROC) to bronze.
29 January 2024	Figure skating Team event	Japan Shoma Uno; Yuma Kagiyama; Wakaba Higuchi; Kaori Sakamoto; Riku Miura; Ryuichi Kihara; Misato Komatsubara; Tim Koleto		+1	-1	0	On 29 January 2024, the Court of Arbitration for Sport (CAS) disqualified Kamila Valieva for four years retroactive to 25 December 2021 for an anti-doping rule violation. On 30 January 2024, the ISU re-allocated medals in the figure skating team event, upgrading the United States to gold and Japan to silver while downgrading the Russian Olympic Committee (ROC) to bronze.

List of official changes by country
NOC	Gold	Silver	Bronze	Net change
ROC	−1	0	+1	0
United States	+1	−1	0	0
Japan	0	+1	−1	0

== See also ==
- 2022 Winter Paralympics medal table
- List of 2022 Winter Olympics medal winners
