= Daniil Aldoshkin =

Russian speed skater (born 2001)

Personal information
- Nationality: Russian
- Born: 19 June 2001 (age 25) Kolomna, Moscow Oblast, Russia

Sport
- Country: Russia
- Sport: Speed skating
- Event: 1500—10000 m
Medal record
Representing ROC
Men's speed skating
Olympic Games
Silver medal – second place	2022 Beijing	Team pursuit

Daniil Alexeyevich Aldoshkin (Russian: Даниил Алексеевич Алдошкин; born 19 June 2001) is a Russian speed skater. He is a silver medalist of the Winter Olympics (2022), bronze medalist of the World Cup in the team race, champion of Russia in the classical all-around, and a silver medalist at a distance of 1500 m.

== Biography ==
Aldoshkin was born on 19 June 2001 in Kolomna. At the age of five, hiss father gave him his first skating lesson, after which he took him to the Kolomna Olympic Reserve Sports School "Kometa". Aldoshkin's first coach was Viktor Sivkov. He cites Sven Kramer as his idol.

On 21 November 2021, Aldoshkin finished first in the 1500-meter race in division B at the second stage of the World Cup in Stavanger, Norway. In 2022, he took part in the Winter Olympics for the first time, becoming the youngest member of the speed skating team and won a silver medal in the team pursuit.

Alodoshkin lives in his native Kolomna, plays for the Comet Sports School. He has been a part-time student of the Faculty of Physical Culture and Sports of the State Social and Humanitarian University (Kolomna).

== Personal records ==
Personal records
Speed skating
Event	Result	Date	Location	Notes
500 metres	36.51	19 March 2022		
1000 metres	1:12.07	11 January 2023	Chelyabinsk	
1500 metres	1:43.66	11 December 2021	Calgary	
3000 metres	3:48.36	15 February 2020	Minsk	
5000 metres	6:17.54	11 February 2021	Heerenveen	
10000 metres	13:27.50	31 October 2021	Kolomna	

He is currently in 64th position in the adelskalender with 149.192 points.
