= List of Olympic records in speed skating =

Speed skating has been contested at the Winter Olympics since the first edition in Chamonix, France, in 1924. The events are held on a long track, which is a 400-metre double-lane ice rink. Olympic records are recognised by the International Skating Union in the individual distances of 500 m, 1000 m, 1500 m, 3000 m (women only), 5000 m, and 10,000 m (men only) and in the team pursuit. Per round of an event, one Olympic record can be set; when the record is broken more than once in the same round, only the best result is considered to be an Olympic record.

== Men's records ==
Men's records
| Event | Time | Name | Nation | Games | Date | Ref. |
|---|---|---|---|---|---|---|
| 500 metres | 33.77 | Jordan Stolz | United States | 2026 Milano Cortina | 14 February 2026 | |
| 500 metres × 2 (Note: From 1998 until 2014, a double-race format was used for the 500 m.) | 69.23 | Casey FitzRandolph | United States | 2002 Salt Lake City | 11 February 2002 | |
| 1000 metres | 1:06.28 | Jordan Stolz | United States | 2026 Milano Cortina | 11 February 2026 | |
| 1500 metres | 1:41.98 | Ning Zhongyan | China | 2026 Milano Cortina | 19 February 2026 | |
| 5000 metres | 6:03.95 | Sander Eitrem | Norway | 2026 Milano Cortina | 8 February 2026 | |
| 10,000 metres | 12:30.74 | Nils van der Poel | Sweden | 2022 Beijing | 11 February 2022 | |
| Team pursuit (Note: In the team pursuit, men skate eight laps on a 400-metre ice rink.) | 3:36.62 | Daniil Aldoshkin; Sergey Trofimov; Ruslan Zakharov | ROC | 2022 Beijing | 15 February 2022 | |

== Women's records ==
Women's records
| Event | Time | Name | Nation | Games | Date | Ref. |
|---|---|---|---|---|---|---|
| 500 metres | 36.49 | Femke Kok | Netherlands | 2026 Milano Cortina | 15 February 2026 | |
| 500 metres × 2 | 74.70 | Lee Sang-hwa | South Korea | 2014 Sochi | 11 February 2014 | |
| 1000 metres | 1:12.31 | Jutta Leerdam | Netherlands | 2026 Milano Cortina | 9 February 2026 | |
| 1500 metres | 1:53.28 | Ireen Wüst | Netherlands | 2022 Beijing | 7 February 2022 | |
| 3000 metres | 3:54.28 | Francesca Lollobrigida | Italy | 2026 Milano Cortina | 7 February 2026 | |
| 5000 metres | 6:43.51 | Irene Schouten | Netherlands | 2022 Beijing | 10 February 2022 | |
| Team pursuit (Note: In the team pursuit, women skate six laps on a 400-metre ice rink.) | 2:53.44 | Ivanie Blondin; Valérie Maltais; Isabelle Weidemann | Canada | 2022 Beijing | 15 February 2022 | |

== See also ==
- List of world records in speed skating
- List of Olympic records in short-track speed skating
