= 2021–22 ISU Speed Skating World Cup =

World speed skating tournament in Europe and North-America

- Dates: 12 November 2021 – 13 March 2022

The 2021–22 ISU Speed Skating World Cup was a series of speed skating competitions held from November 2021 to March 2022. The series began on 12 November 2021 in Poland and ended on 13 March 2022 in Netherlands. The World Cup is organised by the ISU who also runs world cups and championships in short track speed skating and figure skating.

The 2021-22 World Cup series consisted of five competitions. Four of these were held prior to the Olympic Games, while the World Cup Final was held after the Games.

World Cup titles were awarded to the top point earners in the 500m, 1000m, 1500m, Long Distances (combined 5000m/10000m), Mass Start, and Team Pursuit for men. Titles were awarded to the top point earning women for the same distances (Long Distances combined 3000m/5000m for women).

The competitions (except the finals in Heerenveen) were qualifying events for the 2022 Olympic Winter Games in Beijing, China.

== Calendar ==
=== Men ===
==== Tomaszów Mazowiecki 12–14 November 2021 ====
Place	Distance	Winner	Second	Third	Reference
Ice Arena Tomaszów Mazowiecki	500m	(China) Tingyu Gao	(Japan) Tatsuya Shinhama	(Canada) Laurent Dubreuil	
Ice Arena Tomaszów Mazowiecki	500m	(Japan) Tatsuya Shinhama	(Canada) Laurent Dubreuil	(Japan) Wataru Morishige	
Ice Arena Tomaszów Mazowiecki	1000m	(Netherlands) Hein Otterspeer	(Netherlands) Thomas Krol	(Netherlands) Kjeld Nuis	
Ice Arena Tomaszów Mazowiecki	1500m	(South Korea) Kim Min-seok	(China) Ning Zhongyan	(United States) Joey Mantia	
Ice Arena Tomaszów Mazowiecki	5000m	(Sweden) Nils van der Poel	(Canada) Ted-Jan Bloemen	(Netherlands) Patrick Roest	
Ice Arena Tomaszów Mazowiecki	Mass Start	(Japan) Masahito Obayashi	(Russia) Ruslan Zakharov	(Poland) Zbigniew Bródka	
Ice Arena Tomaszów Mazowiecki	Team Pursuit	Netherlands	Canada	Japan	

==== Stavanger 19–21 November 2021 ====
Place	Distance	Winner	Second	Third	Reference
Sørmarka Arena	500m	(Canada) Laurent Dubreuil	(Russia) Artem Arefyev	(Poland) Marek Kania	
Sørmarka Arena	500m	(Japan) Tatsuya Shinhama	(Russia) Artem Arefyev	(Canada) Laurent Dubreuil	
Sørmarka Arena	1000m	(Netherlands) Thomas Krol	(Netherlands) Kai Verbij	(Netherlands) Kjeld Nuis	
Sørmarka Arena	1500m	(China) Ning Zhongyan	(United States) Joey Mantia	(South Korea) Kim Min-seok	
Sørmarka Arena	10000m	(Sweden) Nils van der Poel	(Netherlands) Jorrit Bergsma	(Canada) Ted-Jan Bloemen	
Sørmarka Arena	Team Sprint	China	Norway	Poland	

==== Salt Lake City 3–5 December 2021 ====
Place	Distance	Winner	Second	Third	Reference
Utah Olympic Oval	500m	(Japan) Yamato Matsui	(Japan) Wataru Morishige	(Canada) Laurent Dubreuil	
Utah Olympic Oval	500m	(Japan) Wataru Morishige	(Russia) Artem Arefyev	(Canada) Laurent Dubreuil	
Utah Olympic Oval	1000m	(Netherlands) Thomas Krol	(Netherlands) Kjeld Nuis	(Netherlands) Hein Otterspeer	
Utah Olympic Oval	1500m	(United States) Joey Mantia	(China) Ning Zhongyan	(Netherlands) Thomas Krol	
Utah Olympic Oval	5000m	(Sweden) Nils van der Poel	(Netherlands) Patrick Roest	(Italy) Davide Ghiotto	
Utah Olympic Oval	Mass Start	(Belgium) Bart Swings	(Denmark) Viktor Hald Thorup	(Russia) Ruslan Zakharov	
Utah Olympic Oval	Team Pursuit	United States	Norway	Italy	

==== Calgary 10–12 December 2021 ====
Place	Distance	Winner	Second	Third	Reference
Calgary Olympic Oval	500m	(Canada) Laurent Dubreuil	(China) Tingyu Gao	(Japan) Yuma Murakami	
Calgary Olympic Oval	500m	(Russia) Viktor Mushtakov	(Japan) Yuma Murakami	(Canada) Laurent Dubreuil	
Calgary Olympic Oval	1000m	(China) Ning Zhongyan	(United States) Jordan Stolz	(Russia) Viktor Mushtakov	
Calgary Olympic Oval	1500m	(United States) Joey Mantia	(Canada) Connor Howe	(Norway) Allan Dahl Johansson	
Calgary Olympic Oval	5000m	(Sweden) Nils van der Poel	(Italy) Davide Ghiotto	(Canada) Ted-Jan Bloemen	
Calgary Olympic Oval	Mass Start	(Netherlands) Albertus Hoolwerf	(Belgium) Bart Swings	(Germany) Felix Rijhnen	
Calgary Olympic Oval	Team Pursuit	United States	Norway	Canada	

==== Heerenveen 12–13 March 2022 ====
Place	Distance	Winner	Second	Third	Reference
Thialf	500m	(Japan) Tatsuya Shinhama	(Canada) Laurent Dubreuil (Japan) Wataru Morishige	Not awarded	
Thialf	500m	(Japan) Tatsuya Shinhama	(Poland) Piotr Michalski	(Japan) Wataru Morishige	
Thialf	1000m	(Netherlands) Kjeld Nuis	(Netherlands) Thomas Krol	(Netherlands) Hein Otterspeer	
Thialf	1500m	(Netherlands) Kjeld Nuis	(Netherlands) Thomas Krol	(Canada) Connor Howe	
Thialf	5000m	(Sweden) Nils van der Poel	(Belgium) Bart Swings	(Italy) Davide Ghiotto	
Thialf	Mass Start	(Belgium) Bart Swings	(Italy) Andrea Giovannini	(Netherlands) Jorrit Bergsma	

=== Women ===
==== Tomaszów Mazowiecki 12–14 November 2021 ====
Place	Distance	Winner	Second	Third	Reference
Ice Arena Tomaszów Mazowiecki	500m	(United States) Erin Jackson	(Japan) Nao Kodaira	(Russia) Olga Fatkulina	
Ice Arena Tomaszów Mazowiecki	500m	(United States) Erin Jackson	(Russia) Angelina Golikova	(Japan) Nao Kodaira	
Ice Arena Tomaszów Mazowiecki	1000m	(United States) Brittany Bowe	(Japan) Miho Takagi	(Japan) Nao Kodaira	
Ice Arena Tomaszów Mazowiecki	1500m	(Japan) Miho Takagi	(United States) Brittany Bowe	(Kazakhstan) Nadezhda Morozova	
Ice Arena Tomaszów Mazowiecki	3000m	(Netherlands) Irene Schouten	(Canada) Isabelle Weidemann	(Italy) Francesca Lollobrigida	
Ice Arena Tomaszów Mazowiecki	Mass Start	(Netherlands) Irene Schouten	(Canada) Ivanie Blondin	(Italy) Francesca Lollobrigida	
Ice Arena Tomaszów Mazowiecki	Team Pursuit	Canada	Japan	Netherlands	

==== Stavanger 19–21 November 2021 ====
Place	Distance	Winner	Second	Third	Reference
Sørmarka Arena	500m	(United States) Erin Jackson	(Japan) Nao Kodaira	(Poland) Kaja Ziomek	
Sørmarka Arena	500m	(Japan) Nao Kodaira	(United States) Erin Jackson	(Russia) Angelina Golikova	
Sørmarka Arena	1000m	(United States) Brittany Bowe	(Japan) Miho Takagi	(Japan) Nao Kodaira	
Sørmarka Arena	1500m	(Japan) Miho Takagi	(Netherlands) Ireen Wüst	(Japan) Ayano Sato	
Sørmarka Arena	5000m	(Netherlands) Irene Schouten	(Canada) Isabelle Weidemann	(Norway) Ragne Wiklund	
Sørmarka Arena	Team Sprint	Poland	Canada	China	

==== Salt Lake City 3–5 December 2021 ====
Place	Distance	Winner	Second	Third	Reference
Utah Olympic Oval	500m	(United States) Erin Jackson	(Russia) Angelina Golikova	(Netherlands) Femke Kok	
Utah Olympic Oval	500m	(Poland) Andżelika Wójcik	(Russia) Angelina Golikova	(Russia) Olga Fatkulina	
Utah Olympic Oval	1000m	(Japan) Miho Takagi	(Netherlands) Jutta Leerdam	(United States) Brittany Bowe	
Utah Olympic Oval	1500m	(Japan) Miho Takagi	(Japan) Ayano Sato	(Netherlands) Jutta Leerdam	
Utah Olympic Oval	3000m	(Netherlands) Irene Schouten	(Netherlands) Antoinette de Jong	(Norway) Ragne Wiklund	
Utah Olympic Oval	Mass Start	(Canada) Ivanie Blondin	(Netherlands) Marijke Groenewoud	(Norway) Sofie Karoline Haugen	
Utah Olympic Oval	Team Pursuit	Canada	Netherlands	Russia	

==== Calgary 10–12 December 2021 ====
Place	Distance	Winner	Second	Third	Reference
Calgary Olympic Oval	500m	(Russia) Olga Fatkulina	(Japan) Nao Kodaira	(Russia) Angelina Golikova	
Calgary Olympic Oval	500m	(Russia) Angelina Golikova	(Japan) Nao Kodaira	(United States) Erin Jackson	
Calgary Olympic Oval	1000m	(Japan) Nao Kodaira	(United States) Brittany Bowe	(Russia) Olga Fatkulina	
Calgary Olympic Oval	1500m	(United States) Brittany Bowe	(Japan) Nana Takagi	(Japan) Ayano Sato	
Calgary Olympic Oval	3000m	(Italy) Francesca Lollobrigida	(Canada) Isabelle Weidemann	(Czech Republic) Martina Sáblíkova	
Calgary Olympic Oval	Mass Start	(Italy) Francesca Lollobrigida	(Canada) Ivanie Blondin	(Russia) Elizaveta Golubeva	
Calgary Olympic Oval	Team Pursuit	Canada	Japan	China	

==== Heerenveen 12–13 March 2022 ====
Place	Distance	Winner	Second	Third	Reference
Thialf	500m	(United States) Erin Jackson	(Netherlands) Femke Kok	(Japan) Nao Kodaira	
Thialf	500m	(United States) Erin Jackson	(United States) Brittany Bowe	(South Korea) Kim Min Sun	
Thialf	1000m	(Japan) Miho Takagi	(United States) Brittany Bowe	(United States) Kimi Goetz	
Thialf	1500m	(Japan) Miho Takagi	(Netherlands) Antoinette de Jong	(Norway) Ragne Wiklund	
Thialf	3000m	(Netherlands) Irene Schouten	(Norway) Ragne Wiklund	(Czech Republic) Martina Sáblíková	
Thialf	Mass Start	(Netherlands) Irene Schouten	(Netherlands) Marijke Groenewoud	(Italy) Francesca Lollobrigida	

== World Cup standings ==
=== Men's 500 metres ===
Final standings after 10 events

Pos	Athlete	Points
1.	(Canada) Laurent Dubreuil	614
2.	(Japan) Tatsuya Shinhama	586
3.	(Japan) Wataru Morishige	555
4.	(Japan) Yuma Murakami	477
5.	(Poland) Piotr Michalski	439

=== Women's 500 metres ===
Final standings after 10 events

Pos	Athlete	Points
1.	(United States) Erin Jackson	660
2.	(Japan) Nao Kodaira	572
3.	(Poland) Kaja Ziomek	432
4.	(Netherlands) Femke Kok	410
5.	(Russia) Angelina Golikova	404

=== Men's 1000 metres ===
Final standings after 5 events

Pos	Athlete	Points
1.	(Netherlands) Thomas Krol	282
2.	(Netherlands) Kjeld Nuis	270
3.	(Netherlands) Hein Otterspeer	238
4.	(Norway) Håvard Holmefjord Lorentzen	230
5.	(Netherlands) Kai Verbij	210

=== Women's 1000 metres ===
Final standings after 5 events

Pos	Athlete	Points
1.	(United States) Brittany Bowe	330
2.	(Japan) Miho Takagi	288
3.	(Japan) Nao Kodaira	268
4.	(United States) Kimi Goetz	227
5.	(Kazakhstan) Yekaterina Aidova	204

=== Men's 1500 metres ===
Final standings after 5 events

Pos	Athlete	Points
1.	(United States) Joey Mantia	280
2.	(Canada) Connor Howe	256
3.	(Netherlands) Kjeld Nuis	224
4.	(Netherlands) Thomas Krol	221
5.	(Belgium) Bart Swings	215

=== Women's 1500 metres ===
Final standings after 5 events

Pos	Athlete	Points
1.	(Japan) Miho Takagi	300
2.	(United States) Brittany Bowe	256
3.	(Japan) Ayano Sato	252
4.	(Norway) Ragne Wiklund	238
5.	(Netherlands) Antoinette de Jong	235

=== Men's long distances ===
Final standings after 5 events

Pos	Athlete	Points
1	(Sweden) Nils van der Poel	360
2	(Italy) Davide Ghiotto	272
3	(Canada) Ted-Jan Bloemen	264
4	(Belgium) Bart Swings	259
5	(Netherlands) Jorrit Bergsma	211

=== Women's long distances ===
Final standings after 5 events

Pos	Athlete	Points
1	(Netherlands) Irene Schouten	300
2	(Norway) Ragne Wiklund	290
3	(Italy) Francesca Lollobrigida	266
4	(Czech Republic) Martina Sáblíková	265
5	(Netherlands) Joy Beune	210

=== Men's mass start ===
Final standings after 4 events

Pos	Athlete	Points
1.	(Belgium) Bart Swings	652
2.	(Italy) Andrea Giovannini	550
3.	(Russia) Ruslan Zakharov	425
4.	(South Korea) Chung Jae-won	376
5.	(Netherlands) Jorrit Bergsma	371

=== Women's mass start ===
Final standings after 4 events

Pos	Athlete	Points
1.	(Italy) Francesca Lollobrigida	602
2.	(Canada) Ivanie Blondin	578
3.	(Netherlands) Irene Schouten	506
4.	(Netherlands) Marijke Groenewoud	476
5.	(Canada) Valérie Maltais	362

=== Men's team pursuit ===
Final standings after 3 events

Pos	Athlete	Points
1	United States	312
2	Norway	302
3	Canada	284
4	Netherlands	268
5	Italy	252

=== Women's team pursuit ===
Final standings after 3 events

Pos	Athlete	Points
1	Canada	360
2	Japan	284
3	Netherlands	280
4	Russia	262
5	Norway	242

=== Men's team sprint ===
Final standings after 1 event

Pos	Athlete	Points
1	China	120
2	Norway	108
3	Poland	96
4	Italy	86
5	Belarus	80

=== Women's team sprint ===
Final standings after 1 event

Pos	Athlete	Points
1	Poland	120
2	Canada	108
3	China	96
4	Netherlands	86
5	Russia	80

== See also ==
- 2023 World Single Distances Speed Skating Championships
