= Ski jumping at the 2022 Winter Olympics – Men's normal hill individual =

Men's normal hill individual at the XXIV Olympic Winter Games
- Ski jumping
- Venue: Snow Ruyi, Zhangjiakou
- Date: 5–6 February 2022
- Competitors: 53 from 20 nations
- Winning points: 275.0

Medalists
1st place, gold medalist(s)		Ryōyū Kobayashi	Japan
2nd place, silver medalist(s)		Manuel Fettner	Austria
3rd place, bronze medalist(s)		Dawid Kubacki	Poland

The men's normal hill individual competition of the Beijing 2022 Olympics was held on 5–6 February, at the Snow Ruyi hill in Zhangjiakou. The event was won by Ryōyū Kobayashi of Japan became the Olympic champion. Manuel Fettner of Austria won the silver medal, and Dawid Kubacki of Poland the bronze medal. For Kobayashi and Fettner this was the first ever Olympic medal, and for Kubacki the first individual Olympic medal.

== Summary ==
The 2018 champion, Andreas Wellinger, did not qualify for the Olympics. The silver medalist, Johann André Forfang, and the bronze medalist, Robert Johansson, qualified, but Forfang did not participate in this event. Piotr Żyła is the 2021 World champion. Karl Geiger and Anže Lanišek are the silver and bronze medalists, respectively. Geiger was leading the 2021–22 FIS Ski Jumping World Cup at the start of the Olympics, followed by Ryōyū Kobayashi, Halvor Egner Granerud, and Marius Lindvik.

Kobayashi won the first spring, six points ahead of Peter Prevc. Kamil Stoch, the 2014 champion, was in the third position. In the second jump, Dawid Kubacki, who was eighth in the first round, jumped at 103 m and took the lead. Manuel Fettner, who was fifth, jumped at 104 m, and took the lead as well. Evgenii Klimov, Stoch, and Prevc all demonstrated jumps insufficient for a medal, but Kobayashi with a 99.5 m jump won gold. Kobayashi became the first Japanese athlete to win the ski jumping event after the 1998 games in Nagano, Japan, and second Japanese athlete to win the individual normal hill event after Yukio Kasaya in 1972. This was also the first time that a Japanese athlete won a gold medal in a ski jumping event outside of Japan.

== Schedule ==
=== Official training ===
GMT	Date	Event	Round	Country	Winner	Distance
12:00 PM	3 February 2022	Official training 1	R1	Austria	Manuel Fettner	101.0 m (331.4 ft)
12:00 PM	3 February 2022	Official training 1	R2	Norway	Halvor Egner Granerud	103.5 m (340 ft)
12:00 PM	3 February 2022	Official training 1	R3	ROC	Evgenii Klimov	101.5 m (333 ft)
6:00 AM	4 February 2022	Official training 2	R1	Poland	Kamil Stoch	101.0 m (331.4 ft)
6:00 AM	4 February 2022	Official training 2	R2	Slovenia	Peter Prevc	103.0 m (337.9 ft)
6:00 AM	4 February 2022	Official training 2	R3	Slovenia	Lovro Kos	104.5 m (343 ft)

=== Qualifying ===
GMT	Date	Event	Round	Country	Winner	Distance
5:15 AM	5 February 2022	Trial round	TR	Japan	Ryōyū Kobayashi	106.5 m (349 ft)
6:20 AM	5 February 2022	Qualifications	Q	Norway	Marius Lindvik	100.5 m (330 ft)

=== Competition ===
GMT	Date	Event	Round	Country	Winner	Distance
10:00 AM	6 February 2022	Trial round	TR	ROC	Evgenii Klimov	96.0 m (315.0 ft)
11:00 AM	6 February 2022	1st round	1R	Japan	Ryōyū Kobayashi	104.5 m (343 ft)
12:00 PM	6 February 2022	Final round	2R	Austria	Manuel Fettner	104.0 m (341.2 ft)

== Results ==
=== Qualifying ===
50 ski jumpers qualified for the finals.

Rank	Bib	Name	Country	Distance (m)	Distance points	Judges points	Total	Notes
1	50	Marius Lindvik	Norway	100.5	71.0	54.5	116.7	Q
2	43	Robert Johansson	Norway	103.0	76.0	56.0	116.6	Q
3	34	Piotr Żyła	Poland	102.5	75.0	55.5	112.1	Q
4	52	Ryōyū Kobayashi	Japan	99.0	68.0	54.0	111.4	Q
5	46	Stefan Kraft	Austria	100.0	70.0	55.5	108.5	Q
6	37	Manuel Fettner	Austria	102.0	74.0	54.0	107.5	Q
7	32	Gregor Deschwanden	Switzerland	96.5	63.0	52.5	106.4	Q
8	21	Antti Aalto	Finland	98.5	67.0	53.5	105.0	Q
9	53	Karl Geiger	Germany	97.5	65.0	54.0	103.9	Q
10	41	Yukiya Satō	Japan	100.0	70.0	53.5	103.6	Q
11	39	Stephan Leyhe	Germany	95.5	61.0	52.0	101.6	Q
12	27	Simon Ammann	Switzerland	96.0	62.0	48.5	100.4	Q
13	26	Vladimir Zografski	Bulgaria	97.5	65.0	52.5	99.7	Q
14	30	Evgenii Klimov	ROC	95.5	61.0	52.5	99.5	Q
15	49	Anže Lanišek	Slovenia	94.0	58.0	52.5	98.5	Q
16	28	Dawid Kubacki	Poland	94.0	58.0	52.0	98.3	Q
17	22	Mackenzie Boyd-Clowes	Canada	94.5	59.0	51.5	97.1	Q
18	29	Danil Sadreev	ROC	92.5	55.0	49.0	97.0	Q
19	17	Roman Koudelka	Czech Republic	93.5	57.0	52.5	93.4	Q
20	44	Killian Peier	Switzerland	93.0	56.0	52.0	92.8	Q
21	18	Giovanni Bresadola	Italy	94.0	58.0	52.0	91.8	Q
22	7	Čestmír Kožíšek	Czech Republic	93.0	56.0	51.5	91.4	Q
23	48	Markus Eisenbichler	Germany	91.0	52.0	51.0	90.8	Q
23	45	Daniel Huber	Austria	90.0	50.0	51.0	90.8	Q
25	24	Dominik Peter	Switzerland	91.5	53.0	51.0	88.9	Q
26	31	Junshirō Kobayashi	Japan	93.0	56.0	51.0	88.2	Q
27	16	Stefan Hula	Poland	90.5	51.0	51.0	87.9	Q
28	51	Halvor Egner Granerud	Norway	90.0	50.0	50.5	87.4	Q
29	33	Naoki Nakamura	Japan	88.5	47.0	50.0	87.0	Q
30	42	Timi Zajc	Slovenia	88.0	46.0	51.0	84.3	Q
31	19	Mikhail Nazarov	ROC	86.5	43.0	47.0	81.4	Q
32	3	Kevin Maltsev	Estonia	89.5	49.0	49.5	80.2	Q
33	25	Roman Trofimov	ROC	86.0	42.0	49.5	80.0	Q
33	23	Artti Aigro	Estonia	86.0	42.0	49.5	80.0	Q
35	40	Lovro Kos	Slovenia	87.0	44.0	49.5	79.0	Q
36	35	Kamil Stoch	Poland	83.5	37.0	49.5	78.7	Q
37	47	Jan Hörl	Austria	87.0	44.0	49.5	78.5	Q
38	36	Peter Prevc	Slovenia	82.0	34.0	49.0	77.0	Q
39	38	Constantin Schmid	Germany	86.5	43.0	49.5	76.0	Q
40	12	Daniel Cacina	Romania	83.5	37.0	48.5	70.9	Q
41	2	Casey Larson	United States	79.0	28.0	48.0	69.8	Q
42	20	Decker Dean	United States	81.0	32.0	48.0	66.6	Q
43	11	Kevin Bickner	United States	78.0	26.0	47.5	61.8	Q
44	8	Patrick Gasienica	United States	81.5	33.0	48.0	61.2	Q
45	6	Andrei Feldorean	Romania	76.5	23.0	48.0	55.0	Q
46	15	Fatih Arda İpcioğlu	Turkey	74.5	19.0	43.5	52.8	Q
47	14	Matthew Soukup	Canada	75.0	20.0	46.5	52.7	Q
48	4	Yevhen Marusiak	Ukraine	73.0	16.0	46.0	49.8	Q
49	13	Danil Vassilyev	Kazakhstan	70.5	11.0	46.5	46.2	Q
50	5	Sergey Tkachenko	Kazakhstan	68.0	6.0	43.5	43.1	Q
51	9	Filip Sakala	Czech Republic	67.5	5.0	46.5	39.2	
52	1	Anton Korchuk	Ukraine	67.5	5.0	46.0	38.0	
53	10	Song Qiwu	China	61.5	-7.0	45.0	24.3	

=== Final ===
The final was held on 6 February at 19:00.

Rank	Bib	Name	Country	Round 1			Final round			Total
Rank	Bib	Name	Country	Distance (m)	Points	Rank	Distance (m)	Points	Rank	Points
1st place, gold medalist(s)	49	Ryōyū Kobayashi	Japan	104.5	145.4	1	99.5	129.6	5	275.0
2nd place, silver medalist(s)	34	Manuel Fettner	Austria	102.5	134.5	5	104.0	136.3	1	270.8
3rd place, bronze medalist(s)	25	Dawid Kubacki	Poland	104.0	133.1	8	103.0	132.8	2	265.9
4	33	Peter Prevc	Slovenia	103.0	139.2	2	99.5	126.2	8	265.4
5	27	Evgenii Klimov	ROC	104.0	135.0	4	100.0	126.5	7	261.5
6	32	Kamil Stoch	Poland	101.5	136.3	3	97.5	124.6	13	260.9
7	47	Marius Lindvik	Norway	96.5	128.4	17	102.5	132.3	3	260.7
8	26	Danil Sadreev	ROC	107.5	134.1	7	98.0	125.3	11	259.4
9	39	Timi Zajc	Slovenia	97.0	128.2	18	104.5	131.1	4	259.3
10	43	Stefan Kraft	Austria	98.0	129.2	14	99.5	128.9	6	258.1
11	35	Constantin Schmid	Germany	102.0	134.4	6	98.0	122.9	18	257.3
12	18	Antti Aalto	Finland	101.5	130.5	10	99.5	125.6	9	256.1
13	42	Daniel Huber	Austria	96.0	128.1	19	101.5	125.5	10	253.6
13	46	Anže Lanišek	Slovenia	99.0	130.6	9	98.0	123.0	17	253.6
15	50	Karl Geiger	Germany	96.0	127.5	21	99.0	125.3	11	252.8
16	19	Mackenzie Boyd-Clowes	Canada	100.5	129.8	12	100.0	122.8	19	252.6
17	29	Gregor Deschwanden	Switzerland	99.5	127.6	20	99.0	123.2	16	250.8
18	14	Roman Koudelka	Czech Republic	102.0	130.4	11	97.5	119.1	22	249.5
19	44	Jan Hörl	Austria	98.0	128.9	15	97.0	119.9	20	248.8
20	40	Robert Johansson	Norway	97.0	128.8	16	96.0	119.5	21	248.3
21	31	Piotr Żyła	Poland	95.0	121.6	27	99.0	123.9	14	245.5
22	23	Vladimir Zografski	Bulgaria	99.0	126.7	24	97.0	118.6	23	245.3
23	22	Roman Trofimov	ROC	97.5	120.8	29	98.0	123.9	14	244.7
24	36	Stephan Leyhe	Germany	97.5	129.3	13	95.0	115.1	25	244.4
25	24	Simon Ammann	Switzerland	101.0	123.7	25	97.0	115.8	24	239.5
26	13	Stefan Hula	Poland	103.0	127.0	23	93.5	110.8	27	237.8
27	28	Junshirō Kobayashi	Japan	97.5	123.0	26	92.5	111.0	26	234.0
28	37	Lovro Kos	Slovenia	95.0	120.9	28	92.0	108.7	28	229.6
29	6	Čestmír Kožíšek	Czech Republic	100.0	119.3	30	85.0	92.6	29	211.9
30	48	Halvor Egner Granerud	Norway	97.5	127.4	22	Disqualified			127.4
31	45	Markus Eisenbichler	Germany	92.0	118.4	31	did not advance			
32	16	Mikhail Nazarov	ROC	97.0	118.1	32	did not advance			
32	38	Yukiya Satō	Japan	95.0	118.1	32	did not advance			
34	20	Artti Aigro	Estonia	97.0	116.7	34	did not advance			
35	21	Dominik Peter	Switzerland	95.5	116.0	35	did not advance			
36	12	Fatih Arda İpcioğlu	Turkey	99.0	115.0	36	did not advance			
37	41	Killian Peier	Switzerland	90.5	114.6	37	did not advance			
38	30	Naoki Nakamura	Japan	93.5	114.5	38	did not advance			
39	1	Casey Larson	United States	96.5	113.2	39	did not advance			
40	2	Kevin Maltsev	Estonia	96.5	112.5	40	did not advance			
41	4	Sergey Tkachenko	Kazakhstan	95.0	110.3	41	did not advance			
41	15	Giovanni Bresadola	Italy	93.5	110.3	41	did not advance			
43	8	Kevin Bickner	United States	95.0	108.1	43	did not advance			
44	17	Decker Dean	United States	90.0	106.6	44	did not advance			
45	11	Matthew Soukup	Canada	92.0	103.0	45	did not advance			
46	10	Danil Vassilyev	Kazakhstan	92.0	101.0	46	did not advance			
47	3	Yevhen Marusiak	Ukraine	91.5	97.4	47	did not advance			
48	9	Daniel Cacina	Romania	89.5	95.8	48	did not advance			
49	7	Patrick Gasienica	United States	87.0	89.8	49	did not advance			
50	5	Andrei Feldorean	Romania	82.0	84.3	50	did not advance			
