= Ski jumping at the 2022 Winter Olympics – Qualification =

Qualification rules for ski jumping events Winter Olympics 2022

The following is about the qualification rules and the quota allocation for the ski jumping events at the 2022 Winter Olympics.

== Qualification rules ==
=== Host quota ===
The host, China, will be allowed to enter at least one male and one female competitor provided they meet minimum standards. They must have at least 1 career World Cup or Grand Prix point, or have 1 Continental Cup point during the qualification timeline (1 July 2020 – 16 January 2022). To participate in the men's team event they must earn the required four quotas through the process below.

=== Quotas ===
The quotas will be allocated using the Olympic Quota Allocation List, which is first made up of World Cup and Summer Grand Prix events from 1 July 2020, until 16 January 2022. Then, if there are no athletes remaining on the list, Continental Cup results from the same time period are used. The allocation will be made by assigning one quota place per athlete from the top of the standings downwards until the total of 65 male and 40 female athletes is reached, including the host country individual and/or additional team places. During this allocation no nation may qualify more than five male or four female competitors. If there are less than 12 nations with at least four male competitors, then the next nation with three allocated quota places will be allocated an additional quota place until there are twelve qualified teams. Any remaining quotas will be distributed to nations not yet represented, with a maximum of one each, until the quota limit of 65 is reached.

=== Mixed team event ===
To participate in this event each nation must qualify two male, and two female athletes through the process above. However, if the host (China) does not have the required two male athletes they may use competitors who have qualified in Nordic combined.

== Quota allocation ==
Allocation as of 26 January 2022.

=== Current standings ===
NOC	Athletes				Total
NOC	Men	Women	Men's team	Mixed team	Total
Austria	5	4	X	X	9
Bulgaria	1				1
Canada	2	2		X	4
China	1	2	X (Note: Despite not meeting qualifying criteria China was included in the men's team event using three athletes who had not qualified for the Olympics)	X (Note: China, as the host, is eligible to participate in the mixed team competition as it qualified one male and two female athletes, and one male athlete qualified for Nordic combined events.)	3
Czech Republic	5 (Note: One quota added to be able to participate in the team event.)	3	X	X	8
Estonia	2				2
Finland	~~3~~ 2	2		X	4
France	~~1~~ 0	2			2
Germany	5	4	X	X	9
Italy	~~3~~ 1	~~2~~ 1			2
Japan	5	4	X	X	9
Kazakhstan	2				2
Norway	5	~~4~~ 3	X	X	8
Poland	5	2	X	X	7
Romania	2	1			3
ROC	5	4	X	X	9
Slovenia	5	4	X	X	9
Sweden		1			1
Switzerland	~~5~~ 4		X		4
Turkey	1				1
Ukraine	3				3
United States	4	1	X		5
Total: 22 NOCs	65	40	11	11	105

=== Next eligible NOC per event ===
A country can be eligible for more than one quota spot per event in the reallocation process. Only the first eight spots are listed.

Women's	Men's
Czech Republic; ~~France~~; ~~Poland~~; ~~Czech Republic~~; ~~Poland~~; United States; China; Sweden	~~Finland~~; United States; ~~Finland~~; Romania; Ukraine; Czech Republic; ~~Romania~~; United States
