= Snow Ruyi National Ski Jumping Centre =

Ski jumping hill in Zhangjiakou, China

Coordinates: 40.908528°N 115.465694°E

National Ski Jumping Centre 国家跳台滑雪中心
- Snow Ruyi (雪如意)
- Constructor: China Railway Construction Engineering Company
- Location: Chongli District, Zhangjiakou, Hebei Province, China
- Opened: 3 December 2021 (FIS Continental Cup)

Size
- K–point: 125 metres (410 ft); 95 metres (312 ft)
- Hill size: 140 metres (460 ft); 106 metres (348 ft)
- Hill record: LARGE HILL: 142 metres (466 ft) (Japan) Ryōyū Kobayashi (12 February 2022): - - - - - - - - - - - - - - - - - - -; NORMAL HILL (W): 108 metres (354 ft) (Slovenia) Urša Bogataj (5 February 2022): - - - - - - - - - - - - - - - - - - -; NORMAL HILL (M): 107.5 metres (353 ft) (Russia) Danil Sadreev (6 February 2022): - - - - - - - - - - - - - - - - - - -; LARGE HILL (NOR.KB): 142.5 metres (468 ft) (Germany) Vinzenz Geiger (14 February 2022): - - - - - - - - - - - - - - - - - - -; NORMAL HILL (NO.KB): 108 metres (354 ft) (Japan) Ryōta Yamamoto (9 February 2022)

Top events
- Olympics: 2022

The National Ski Jumping Centre (Chinese: 国家跳台滑雪中心; pinyin: Guójiā Tiàotái Huáxuě Zhōngxīn), nicknamed Snow Ruyi (Chinese: 雪如意; pinyin: Xuě Rúyì), is a Chinese ski jumping hill in Chongli District, Zhangjiakou, Hebei Province, China, opened in 2021.

It is located 180 kilometres (110 mi) northwest from Beijing and hosted the 2022 Winter Olympics in ski jumping and Nordic combined. After the Olympics, the facilities shall serve as a national training centre, potentially also including junior hills to be built. Hill was designed by Zhiang Li, and got its widely known name after "Ruyi", a traditional Chinese ornament symbolizing good luck.

Beside summer ski jumping on plastic, the flat finish (jump out) area of the hill stadium, with grandstand capacity for 6,000 people, will be also used as a football (soccer) pitch in the summer.

== History ==
In 2017, construction started and was planned to be completed in 2019. But due to the unconventional location in between two hills, the elaborate works were done in November 2020.

The Olympic ski jumping stadium was then inaugurated with a celebration on 21 December 2020. One month later, on 19 January 2021, CCP general secretary Xi Jinping visited the Olympic sports facilities.

Due to the COVID-19 pandemic, all international test events, including World Cup and Continental Cup, in the 2020–21 season had to be cancelled. Premiere jumps were hosted at Continental Cup in December 2021.

German ski jumper David Siegel, also a hill record holder at 141 metres (463 ft), won the premiere event on large hill at Continental Cup.

On 5 February 2022, Slovenian female ski jumper Urša Bogataj, became the first olympic champion with gold at new normal hill (HS106) and also set hill record at 108 metres (354 ft) in the first round.

On 6 February 2022, Japan ski jumper Ryōyū Kobayashi became the Olympic champion at men's normal hill (HS106) event. Danil Sadreev from Russia set hil record in 1st round at 107.5 metres (353 ft).

On 7 February 2022, Slovenian national team (Nika Križnar, Timi Zajc, Urša Bogataj and Peter Prevc) won historic first ever ski jumping mixed team event in Olympics history with the outstanding record advantage of 111.2 points in front of the runner-up Russia. Third place took Canada, a totally unexpected result. Four women's disqualifications due to the irregular dress equipment in teams of Japan, Austria, Germany and Norway, did change the course of the event, especially for the podiums, but did not in any way influenced in a battle for gold, where Slovenia firmly held strong lead from the beginning of the competition.

Due to controversy of four disqualifications at the ski jumping mixed team event and complaints of several national teams, Agnieszka Aga Baczkowska who is responsible for equipment control, told the media what was actually happening behind the scenes. She explained that some of the four disqualified female had the dresses even up to 10 cm too big according to the FIS rules, it was obvious even on the eye.

On 9 February 2022, German Vinzenz Geiger won gold medal at Nordic combined Individual normal hill/10 km (HS 106) event. Japanese Ryōta Yamamoto tied absolute hill record at 108 metres (354 ft).

On 12 February 2022, Marius Lindvik became the Olympic champion at men's large hill (HS140) event. Ryōyū Kobayashi was leading after 1st run, where he set absolute hill record at 142 metres (466 ft).

On 14 February 2022, German Vinzenz Geiger set the absolute hill record at 142.5 metres (468 ft) on Nordic combined training. Austria won gold medal at Men's large hill team (HS 140) event later that day.

== Olympics ==
=== Ski jumping ===
Location in China
Location in Asia

No.	Date	Hill	Gold	Silver	Bronze
Women's individual
3	5 February 2022	HS106	(Slovenia) Urša Bogataj	(Germany) Katharina Althaus	(Slovenia) Nika Križnar
Men's individual
16	6 February 2022	HS106	(Japan) Ryōyū Kobayashi	(Austria) Manuel Fettner	(Poland) Dawid Kubacki
24	12 February 2022	HS140	(Norway) Marius Lindvik	(Japan) Ryōyū Kobayashi	(Germany) Karl Geiger
Mixed team
1	7 February 2022	HS106	Slovenia Nika Križnar; Timi Zajc; Urša Bogataj; Peter Prevc	ROC Irma Makhinia; Danil Sadreev; Irina Avvakumova; Evgenii Klimov	Canada Alexandria Loutitt; Matthew Soukup; Abigail Strate; Mackenzie Boyd-Clowes
Men's team
10	14 February 2022	HS140	Austria Stefan Kraft; Daniel Huber; Jan Hörl; Manuel Fettner	Slovenia Lovro Kos; Cene Prevc; Timi Zajc; Peter Prevc	Germany Constantin Schmid; Stephan Leyhe; Markus Eisenbichler; Karl Geiger

=== Nordic combined ===
Cross-country skiing was held in Kuyangshu Nordic Center.

No.	Date	Hill	Gold	Silver	Bronze
Men's individual 10 km
24	9 February 2022	HS106	(Germany) Vinzenz Geiger	(Norway) Jørgen Graabak	(Austria) Lukas Greiderer
6	15 February 2022	HS140	(Norway) Jørgen Graabak	(Norway) Jens Lurås Oftebro	(Japan) Akito Watabe
Men's team relay 4 x 5 km
10	17 February 2022	HS140	Norway Espen Bjørnstad; Espen Andersen; Jens Lurås Oftebro; Jørgen Graabak	Germany Manuel Faißt; Julian Schmid; Eric Frenzel; Vinzenz Geiger	Japan Yoshito Watabe; Hideaki Nagai; Akito Watabe; Ryota Yamamoto

== World Cup ==
=== Women ===
No.	Date	Hillsize	Winner	Second	Third
	13 February 2021	HS106	cancelled due to the COVID-19 pandemic		
	14 February 2021	HS106	cancelled due to the COVID-19 pandemic		
236	14 December 2024	HS106	(Germany) Katharina Schmid	(Norway) Eirin Maria Kvandal	(Slovenia) Nika Prevc
237	15 December 2024	HS106	(Germany) Katharina Schmid	(Slovenia) Ema Klinec	(Austria) Lisa Eder
274	16 January 2026	HS140	(Slovenia) Nika Prevc	(Japan) Nozomi Maruyama	(Germany) Selina Freitag
275	17 January 2026	HS140	(Slovenia) Nika Prevc	(Norway) Anna Odine Strøm	(Japan) Nozomi Maruyama

=== Men ===
No.	Date	Hillsize	Winner	Second	Third
	13 February 2021	HS140	cancelled due to the COVID-19 pandemic		
	14 February 2021	HS140	cancelled due to the COVID-19 pandemic		

== Profile ==
=== Normal hill ===
Inrun
Length	100 m
Speed	90.8 km/h
Incline	35°
Take-off table
Height	2.37 m
Length	6.5 m
Incline	11°
Landing zone
Max incline	34°
Size
Top to bottom difference	114.7 m
Hill size (HS)	106 m
Construction point (K-point)	95 m
Hill record
Men (SKI JUMPING) (6 February 2022)	107.5 m (353 ft) (Russia) Danil Sadreev
Men (NORDIC COMBINED) (9 February 2022)	108 m (354 ft) (Japan) Ryōta Yamamoto
Women (5 February 2022)	108 m (354 ft) (Slovenia) Urša Bogataj

=== Large hill ===
Inrun
Length	105.2 m
Speed	94.6 km/h
Incline	35°
Take-off table
Height	3.12 m
Length	6.98 m
Incline	11°
Landing zone
Max incline (K-point)	34°
HS incline	31°
Size
Top to bottom difference	136.2 m
Hill size (HS)	140 m
Construction point (K-point)	125 m
Hill record
Men (SKI JUMPING) (12 February 2022)	142 m (466 ft) (Japan) Ryōyū Kobayashi
Men (NORDIC COMBINED) (14 February 2022)	142.5 m (468 ft) (Germany) Vinzenz Geiger
Women	no events held yet there
