= Ski jumping at the 2022 Winter Olympics – Men's large hill team =

Men's large hill team at the XXIV Olympic Winter Games
- Ski jumping
- Venue: Snow Ruyi, Zhangjiakou
- Date: 14 February 2022
- Competitors: 44 from 11 nations
- Teams: 11
- Winning points: 942.7

Medalists
1st place, gold medalist(s)		Stefan Kraft; Daniel Huber; Jan Hörl; Manuel Fettner	Austria
2nd place, silver medalist(s)		Lovro Kos; Cene Prevc; Timi Zajc; Peter Prevc	Slovenia
3rd place, bronze medalist(s)		Constantin Schmid; Stephan Leyhe; Markus Eisenbichler; Karl Geiger	Germany

The men's large hill team competition of the Beijing 2022 Olympics was held on 14 February, at the Snow Ruyi hill in Zhangjiakou. Austria became the Olympic champion, with Slovenia and Germany being the silver and bronze medalist, respectively.

The defending champion were Norway. The silver medalist was Germany, and the bronze medalist were Poland. Germany were the 2021 World champion. Austria and Poland were the silver and bronze medalists, respectively. Only three men's team events were held in the framework of the 2021–22 FIS Ski Jumping World Cup before the Olympics; two were won by Austria and one by Slovenia.

== Schedule ==
=== Competition ===
GMT	Date	Event	Round
10:00 AM	14 February 2022	Trial round	TR
11:00 AM	14 February 2022	1st round	1R
12:23 PM	14 February 2022	Final round	2R

== Results ==
Rank	Bib	Country	Round 1			Final round			Total
Rank	Bib	Country	Distance (m)	Points	Rank	Distance (m)	Points	Rank	Points
1st place, gold medalist(s)	10; 10–1; 10–2; 10–3; 10–4	Austria; Stefan Kraft; Daniel Huber; Jan Hörl; Manuel Fettner	127.5; 130.5; 133.0; 128.0	458.4; 111.6; 116.1; 120.2; 110.5	2	121.5; 129.0; 137.5; 128.0	484.3; 119.7; 115.1; 130.5; 119.0	1	942.7; 231.3; 231.2; 250.7; 229.5
2nd place, silver medalist(s)	8; 8–1; 8–2; 8–3; 8–4	Slovenia; Lovro Kos; Cene Prevc; Timi Zajc; Peter Prevc	134.0; 132.0; 124.0; 129.0	467.4; 126.7; 119.3; 110.6; 110.8	1	120.0; 132.0; 126.0; 127.0	467.0; 107.7; 126.3; 117.0; 116.0	3	934.4; 234.4; 245.6; 227.6; 226.8
3rd place, bronze medalist(s)	11; 11–1; 11–2; 11–3; 11–4	Germany; Constantin Schmid; Stephan Leyhe; Markus Eisenbichler; Karl Geiger	126.5; 127.5; 136.0; 121.0	446.5; 112.7; 108.7; 119.4; 105.7	4	122.0; 129.0; 139.5; 128.0	476.4; 106.6; 113.3; 137.5; 119.0	2	922.9; 219.3; 222.0; 256.9; 224.7
4	9; 9–1; 9–2; 9–3; 9–4	Norway; Halvor Egner Granerud; Daniel-André Tande; Robert Johansson; Marius Lindvik	138.0; 130.5; 125.5; 121.0	456.5; 128.3; 118.2; 109.7; 100.3	3	118.5; 124.0; 136.5; 126.5	465.6; 108.5; 113.7; 127.8; 115.6	4	922.1; 236.8; 231.9; 237.5; 215.9
5	7; 7–1; 7–2; 7–3; 7–4	Japan; Yukiya Satō; Naoki Nakamura; Junshirō Kobayashi; Ryōyū Kobayashi	126.0; 124.5; 128.5; 134.0	438.5; 110.8; 96.6; 105.1; 126.0	5	124.0; 122.0; 120.0; 132.5	444.3; 114.9; 97.8; 99.0; 132.6	6	882.8; 225.7; 194.4; 204.1; 258.6
6	6; 6–1; 6–2; 6–3; 6–4	Poland; Piotr Żyła; Paweł Wąsek; Dawid Kubacki; Kamil Stoch	118.0; 131.5; 122.0; 137.0	434.5; 96.4; 116.1; 95.5; 126.5	6	125.5; 120.0; 126.0; 127.5	445.6; 119.5; 97.2; 107.5; 121.4	5	880.1; 215.9; 213.3; 203.0; 247.9
7	4; 4–1; 4–2; 4–3; 4–4	ROC; Danil Sadreev; Roman Trofimov; Mikhail Nazarov; Evgenii Klimov	128.5; 127.0; 120.0; 118.0	410.6; 115.4; 103.1; 92.8; 99.3	7	119.0; 119.5; 117.0; 121.0	395.9; 100.4; 99.7; 89.3; 106.5	8	806.5; 215.8; 202.8; 182.1; 205.8
8	5; 5–1; 5–2; 5–3; 5–4	Switzerland; Dominik Peter; Gregor Deschwanden; Simon Ammann; Killian Peier	112.0; 122.0; 116.0; 118.5	367.0; 87.7; 103.6; 87.5; 88.2	8	119.0; 123.5; 121.5; 124.0	424.5; 103.4; 110.6; 104.9; 105.6	7	791.5; 191.1; 214.2; 192.4; 193.8
9	3; 3–1; 3–2; 3–3; 3–4	Czech Republic; Viktor Polášek; Čestmír Kožíšek; Filip Sakala; Roman Koudelka	108.0; 109.0; 101.0; 107.5	279.5; 76.8; 70.9; 55.4; 76.4	9	did not advance			
10	2; 2–1; 2–2; 2–3; 2–4	United States; Decker Dean; Patrick Gasienica; Kevin Bickner; Casey Larson	92.5; 105.5; 103.0; 106.0	261.0; 69.3; 59.7; 63.5; 68.5	10	did not advance			
11	1; 1–1; 1–2; 1–3; 1–4	China; Zhen Weijie; Lyu Yixin; Song Qiwu; Zhou Xiaoyang	84.0; 90.0; 86.0; 86.0	115.0; 13.5; 35.3; 31.7; 34.5	11	did not advance			
