= FIS Nordic World Ski Championships 2023 – Men's team large hill =

Men's team large hill at the FIS Nordic World Ski Championships 2023
- Venue: Bloudkova velikanka (HS138)
- Location: Planica, Slovenia
- Dates: 4 March
- Competitors: 44 from 11 nations
- Teams: 11
- Winning points: 1178.9

Medalists
gold medal	Lovro Kos; Žiga Jelar; Timi Zajc; Anže Lanišek	Slovenia
silver medal	Johann André Forfang; Kristoffer Eriksen Sundal; Marius Lindvik; Halvor Egner Granerud	Norway
bronze medal	Daniel Tschofenig; Michael Hayböck; Jan Hörl; Stefan Kraft	Austria

The Men's team large hill competition at the FIS Nordic World Ski Championships 2023 was held on 4 March 2023.

== Results ==
The first round was started at 16:30 and the final round at 17:35.

Rank	Bib	Country	Round 1			Final round			Total
Rank	Bib	Country	Distance (m)	Points	Rank	Distance (m)	Points	Rank	Points
1st place, gold medalist(s)	8	Slovenia; Lovro Kos; Žiga Jelar; Timi Zajc; Anže Lanišek	135.0; 133.5; 132.0; 138.0	597.6; 141.1; 145.6; 154.4; 156.5	1	131.0; 138.0; 136.0; 135.5	581.3; 129.0; 146.9; 153.3; 152.1	1	1178.9
2nd place, silver medalist(s)	10	Norway; Johann André Forfang; Kristoffer Eriksen Sundal; Marius Lindvik; Halvor Egner Granerud	137.0; 133.5; 125.5; 136.5	587.8; 144.5; 143.5; 145.4; 154.4	2	139.5; 133.5; 131.5; 135.5	578.2; 148.0; 137.5; 143.0; 149.7	2	1166.0
3rd place, bronze medalist(s)	11	Austria; Daniel Tschofenig; Michael Hayböck; Jan Hörl; Stefan Kraft	136.0; 134.0; 126.5; 135.0	587.0; 142.0; 148.4; 144.3; 152.3	3	135.5; 136.0; 129.5; 127.0	552.4; 141.7; 142.5; 139.6; 128.6	5	1139.4
4	9	Poland; Kamil Stoch; Piotr Żyła; Aleksander Zniszczoł; Dawid Kubacki	136.0; 131.5; 122.0; 137.0	572.9; 142.7; 140.3; 134.3; 155.6	5	135.0; 133.0; 131.5; 128.5	556.2; 141.4; 139.4; 140.0; 135.4	3	1129.1
5	7	Germany; Constantin Schmid; Markus Eisenbichler; Andreas Wellinger; Karl Geiger	137.0; 133.0; 126.5; 136.0	574.9; 138.4; 141.7; 140.4; 154.4	4	130.5; 129.5; 131.0; 135.5	552.8; 131.5; 134.5; 139.9; 146.9	4	1127.7
6	4	Switzerland; Gregor Deschwanden; Killian Peier; Remo Imhof; Simon Ammann	128.5; 122.0; 123.0; 129.5	522.3; 130.1; 124.1; 132.1; 136.0	6	129.5; 118.0; 121.5; 127.5	489.9; 127.1; 114.0; 121.1; 127.7	7	1012.2
7	6	Japan; Naoki Nakamura; Junshiro Kobayashi; Ren Nikaido; Ryōyū Kobayashi	124.0; 123.0; 118.0; 133.0	508.7; 115.5; 120.1; 124.0; 149.1	7	122.5; 117.0; 124.0; 136.0	502.3; 114.0; 110.1; 125.1; 153.1	6	1011.0
8	3	United States; Decker Dean; Casey Larson; Andrew Urlaub; Erik Belshaw	117.0; 124.5; 125.5; 126.5	497.3; 105.2; 122.9; 134.5; 134.7	8	120.0; 122.0; 118.0; 129.0	478.1; 107.1; 119.3; 114.8; 136.9	8	975.4
9	5	Finland; Eetu Nousiainen; Vilho Palosaari; Antti Aalto; Niko Kytösaho	125.0; 116.5; 117.0; 124.5	483.7; 123.0; 106.1; 122.9; 131.7	9	Did not qualify			
10	2	Romania; Andrei Feldorean; Nicolae Mitrofan; Mihnea Spulber; Daniel Cacina	110.0; 112.0; 100.5; 117.0	384.7; 95.3; 94.4; 78.7; 116.3	10	Did not qualify			
11	1	Kazakhstan; Svyastoslav Nazarenko; Sabirżan Muminow; Sergey Tkachenko; Danil Vassilyev	NPS; 109.0; 105.0; 120.0	298.9 90.2; 89.0; 119.7	11	Did not qualify			
