= Ski jumping at the 2022 Winter Olympics =

Ski jumping at the XXIV Olympic Winter Games
- Ski jumping pictogram
- Venue: Snow Ruyi
- Dates: 5–14 February 2022
- No. of events: 5 (3 men, 1 women, 1 mixed)
- Competitors: 105

Ski jumping at the 2022 Winter Olympics was held at the Snow Ruyi hill in Zhangjiakou, China. The events were held between 5 and 14 February 2022.

In July 2018, the International Olympic Committee (IOC) officially added the mixed team event to the Olympic program, increasing the total number of events to 5. A total of 105 quota spots (65 men and 40 women) were distributed to the sport, the same as the 2018 Winter Olympics. A total of five events were contested, three for men, one for women and one mixed.

On 7 February, Canada won the bronze medal in the mixed team competition, the first ever ski jumping medal for the country at the Winter Olympics.

== Qualification ==
A maximum of 105 athletes (65 male and 40 female) will be allowed to qualify for the ski jumping events. The quotas will be allocated using the Olympic Quota Allocation List, which is calculated using the FIS World Cup, FIS Ski Jumping Grand Prix and Continental Cup Standings from seasons 2020–21 and 2021–22 added together.

== Competition schedule ==
The following was the competition schedule for the five ski jumping events.

All times are (UTC+8).

Date	Time	Event
5 February	14:20	Men's individual normal hill qualification
5 February	18:45	Women's individual normal hill
6 February	19:00	Men's individual normal hill
7 February	19:45	Mixed team normal hill
11 February	19:00	Men's individual large hill qualification
12 February	19:00	Men's individual large hill
14 February	19:00	Men's team large hill

== Medal summary ==
=== Medal table ===
Rank	Nation	Gold	Silver	Bronze	Total
1	Slovenia	2	1	1	4
2	Austria	1	1	0	2
2	Japan	1	1	0	2
4	Norway	1	0	0	1
5	Germany	0	1	2	3
6	ROC	0	1	0	1
7	Canada	0	0	1	1
7	Poland	0	0	1	1
Totals (8 entries)		5	5	5	15

=== Medalists ===
Event	Gold		Silver		Bronze	
Men's normal hill individual	Ryōyū Kobayashi; Japan	275.0	Manuel Fettner; Austria	270.8	Dawid Kubacki; Poland	265.9
Men's large hill individual	Marius Lindvik; Norway	296.1	Ryōyū Kobayashi; Japan	292.8	Karl Geiger; Germany	281.3
Men's large hill team	Austria; Stefan Kraft; Daniel Huber; Jan Hörl; Manuel Fettner	942.7	Slovenia; Lovro Kos; Cene Prevc; Timi Zajc; Peter Prevc	934.4	Germany; Constantin Schmid; Stephan Leyhe; Markus Eisenbichler; Karl Geiger	922.9
Women's normal hill individual	Urša Bogataj; Slovenia	239.0	Katharina Althaus; Germany	236.8	Nika Križnar; Slovenia	232.0
Mixed normal hill team	Slovenia; Nika Križnar; Timi Zajc; Urša Bogataj; Peter Prevc	1001.5	ROC; Irma Makhinia; Danil Sadreev; Irina Avvakumova; Evgenii Klimov	890.3	Canada; Alexandria Loutitt; Matthew Soukup; Abigail Strate; Mackenzie Boyd-Clowes	844.6

== Participating nations ==
A total of 110 athletes (70 men and 40 women) from 22 nations (including the IOC's designation of ROC for the Russian Olympic Committee) qualified to participate.

The numbers in parentheses represent the number of participants entered.

- Austria (9)
- Bulgaria (1)
- Canada (4)
- China (7)
- Czech Republic (8)
- Estonia (2)
- Finland (4)
- France (2)
- Germany (9)
- Italy (2)
- Japan (9)
- Kazakhstan (2)
- Norway (9)
- Poland (7)
- ROC (9)
- Romania (3)
- Slovenia (9)
- Sweden (1)
- Switzerland (4)
- Turkey (1)
- Ukraine (3)
- United States (5)
