= Nordic combined at the 2022 Winter Olympics – Qualification =

Qualification Rules For Olympics

The following is about the qualification rules and the quota allocation for the Nordic combined events at the 2022 Winter Olympics.

== Qualification ==
A total of 55 quota spots are available to athletes to compete at the games. A maximum of 5 athletes can be entered by a National Olympic Committee. Competitors are eligible to compete if they have scored a World or Grand Prix point in their career, or at least one Continental cup event during the qualification period of July 2020 to 16 January 2022. The top 50 on the Olympic quota allocation list respecting the maximum of 5 per country will qualify to compete, including the host. The host will be allowed to enter one competitor in each competition including the relay provided the athletes are on the allocation list. Following the top 50, if there is not ten nations with enough athletes to form a relay team, then nations with 3 qualified athletes will be granted an additional quota. If at that point, the maximum has not been achieved the highest ranking athletes from unrepresented nations will be chosen.

== Quota allocation ==
Allocation as of 17 January 2022.

=== Summary ===
Nations	Athletes	Team
Austria	**5**	X
China	**1**	X (Note: Despite not meeting qualifying criteria China was included in the men's team event using three athletes who had not qualified for the Olympics)
Czech Republic	**4**	X
Estonia	**1**	
Finland	**5**	X
France	**5**	X
Germany	**5**	X
Italy	**4**	X
Japan	**5**	X
Kazakhstan	**1**	
Latvia	**1**	
Norway	**5**	X
Poland	**2**	
ROC	**3**	
Slovenia	**1**	
South Korea	**1**	
Switzerland	~~1~~ **0**	
Ukraine	**1**	
United States	**5**	X
Total: 19 NOCs	55	10

=== Next eligible NOC ===
Ona quotas was rejected and made available for reallocation. Bold indicates the acceptance of a quota.

Men's
**France**
Italy
ROC
Czech Republic
Estonia
