= United States at the 2022 Winter Olympics =

- Flag of the United States
- IOC code: USA
- NOC: United States Olympic & Paralympic Committee
- Website: www.teamusa.org

in Beijing, China February 4–20, 2022
- Competitors: 224 (116 men and 108 women) in 8 sports
- Flag bearers (opening): John Shuster; Brittany Bowe
- Flag bearer (closing): Elana Meyers Taylor
- Medals Ranked 3rd: Gold 9 Silver 9 Bronze 7 Total 25

Winter Olympics appearances (overview)
- 1924; 1928; 1932; 1936; 1948; 1952; 1956; 1960; 1964; 1968; 1972; 1976; 1980; 1984; 1988; 1992; 1994; 1998; 2002; 2006; 2010; 2014; 2018; 2022; 2026

The United States competed at the 2022 Winter Olympics in Beijing, China, from February 4 to 20, 2022.

On January 24, 2022, the United States Olympic & Paralympic Committee named a team of 224 athletes. Curler John Shuster and speed skater Brittany Bowe were named U.S. flagbearers for the opening ceremony. (Note: Bowe replaced Elana Meyers Taylor, who withdrew from the ceremony after testing positive for COVID-19.) Bobsledder Elana Meyers Taylor was named flagbearer for the closing ceremony.

The United States won nine gold and 25 medals overall at the 2022 Winter Olympics, finishing third in the medal standings, an improvement from fourth in the previous two Winter Olympics and matching the gold medal totals from the four previous Games. Notable successes included Jessie Diggins becoming the first American female skier to win individual cross-country medals, figure skater Nathan Chen breaking the short program world record en route to the Olympic gold medal in the men's singles, Erin Jackson becoming the first Black female athlete of any country to win an Olympic gold (in speed skating), and Chloe Kim defending her title in the snowboarding women's halfpipe. Veteran snowboarder Lindsey Jacobellis, who last medaled at the 2006 Winter Olympics in Turin, was one of just two U.S. athletes with multiple gold medals, winning the women's snowboard cross event, and sharing the gold with teammate Nick Baumgartner in the mixed snowboard cross event. Figure skater Nathan Chen won gold in both the team and individual men's events. Kaillie Humphries won gold in women's monobob, with the event having made its debut at these games.

== Medalists ==
The following U.S. competitors won medals at the games. In the by discipline sections below, medalists' names are bolded.

Medal	Name	Sport	Event	Date
Gold	Evan Bates; Karen Chen; Nathan Chen^{[a]} Madison Chock; Zachary Donohue^{[a]} Brandon Frazier; Madison Hubbell^{[a]} Alexa Knierim; Vincent Zhou	Figure skating	Team event	February 7
Gold	Lindsey Jacobellis	Snowboarding	Women's snowboard cross	February 9
Gold	Nathan Chen	Figure skating	Men's singles	February 10
Gold	Ashley Caldwell; Christopher Lillis; Justin Schoenefeld	Freestyle skiing	Mixed team aerials	February 10
Gold	Chloe Kim	Snowboarding	Women's halfpipe	February 10
Gold	Nick Baumgartner; Lindsey Jacobellis	Snowboarding	Mixed team snowboard cross	February 12
Gold	Erin Jackson	Speed skating	Women's 500 m	February 13
Gold	Kaillie Humphries	Bobsleigh	Women's monobob	February 14
Gold	Alex Hall	Freestyle skiing	Men's slopestyle	February 16
Silver	Jaelin Kauf	Freestyle skiing	Women's moguls	February 6
Silver	Julia Marino	Snowboarding	Women's slopestyle	February 6
Silver	Ryan Cochran-Siegle	Alpine skiing	Men's super-G	February 8
Silver	Colby Stevenson	Freestyle skiing	Men's big air	February 9
Silver	Elana Meyers Taylor	Bobsleigh	Women's monobob	February 14
Silver	Nick Goepper	Freestyle skiing	Men's slopestyle	February 16
Silver	United States women's national ice hockey team: Cayla Barnes; Megan Bozek; Hannah Brandt; Dani Cameranesi; Alexandra Carpenter; Alex Cavallini; Jesse Compher; Kendall Coyne Schofield; Brianna Decker; Jincy Roese; Savannah Harmon; Caroline Harvey; Nicole Hensley; Megan Keller; Amanda Kessel; Hilary Knight; Abbey Murphy; Kelly Pannek; Maddie Rooney; Abby Roque; Hayley Scamurra; Lee Stecklein; Grace Zumwinkle	Ice hockey	Women's tournament	February 17
Silver	David Wise	Freestyle skiing	Men's halfpipe	February 19
Silver	Jessie Diggins	Cross-country skiing	Women's 30 km freestyle	February 20
Bronze	Jessie Diggins	Cross-country skiing	Women's sprint	February 8
Bronze	Zachary Donohue; Madison Hubbell	Figure skating	Ice dance	February 14
Bronze	Megan Nick	Freestyle skiing	Women's aerials	February 14
Bronze	Ethan Cepuran^{[a]} Casey Dawson; Emery Lehman; Joey Mantia	Speed skating	Men's team pursuit	February 15
Bronze	Brittany Bowe	Speed skating	Women's 1000 m	February 17
Bronze	Sylvia Hoffman; Elana Meyers Taylor	Bobsleigh	Two-woman	February 19
Bronze	Alex Ferreira	Freestyle skiing	Men's halfpipe	February 19

Medals by sport
Sport	1st place, gold medalist(s)	2nd place, silver medalist(s)	3rd place, bronze medalist(s)	Total
Snowboarding	3	1	0	**4**
Freestyle skiing	2	4	2	**8**
Figure skating	2	0	1	**3**
Bobsleigh	1	1	1	**3**
Speed skating	1	0	2	**3**
Cross-country skiing	0	1	1	**2**
Alpine skiing	0	1	0	**1**
Ice hockey	0	1	0	**1**
Total	9	9	7	25

Medals by day
Day	Date	1st place, gold medalist(s)	2nd place, silver medalist(s)	3rd place, bronze medalist(s)	Total
1	February 5	0	0	0	**0**
2	February 6	0	2	0	**2**
3	February 7	1	0	0	**1**
4	February 8	0	1	1	**2**
5	February 9	1	1	0	**2**
6	February 10	3	0	0	**3**
7	February 11	0	0	0	**0**
8	February 12	1	0	0	**1**
9	February 13	1	0	0	**1**
10	February 14	1	1	2	**4**
11	February 15	0	0	1	**1**
12	February 16	1	1	0	**2**
13	February 17	0	1	1	**2**
14	February 18	0	0	0	**0**
15	February 19	0	1	2	**3**
16	February 20	0	1	0	**1**
Total		9	9	7	25

Medals by gender
Gender	1st place, gold medalist(s)	2nd place, silver medalist(s)	3rd place, bronze medalist(s)	Total	Percentage
Female	4	5	4	**13**	52.0%
Male	2	4	2	**8**	32.0%
Mixed	3	0	1	**4**	16.0%
Total	9	9	7	25	100%

Multiple medalists
Name	Sport	1st place, gold medalist(s)	2nd place, silver medalist(s)	3rd place, bronze medalist(s)	Total
Lindsey Jacobellis	Snowboarding	2	0	0	**2**
Nathan Chen	Figure skating	2	0	0	**2**
Madison Hubbell	Figure skating	1	0	1	**2**
Zachary Donohue	Figure skating	1	0	1	**2**
Elana Meyers Taylor	Bobsleigh	0	1	1	**2**
Jessie Diggins	Cross-country skiing	0	1	1	**2**

^{a} Athletes that competed in preliminary/qualification rounds but not final round.

== Competitors ==
The following is the list of number of competitors participating at the Games per sport.

Sport	Men	Women	Total
Alpine skiing	6	11	17
Biathlon	4	4	8
Bobsleigh	8	4	12
Cross-country skiing	6	8	14
Curling	5	6	11
Figure skating	8	8	16
Freestyle skiing	16	16	32
Ice hockey	25	23	48
Luge	5	3	8
Nordic combined	5	—N/a	5
Short track speed skating	2	5	7
Skeleton	1	2	3
Ski jumping	4	1	5
Snowboarding	14	12	26
Speed skating	7	5	12
Total	116	108	224

== Alpine skiing ==
The United States qualified a team of six men and 12 women.

The most decorated skier on the U.S. side was Mikaela Shiffrin, who was favored to win gold in several of the six events she was planning to compete in (especially slalom and giant slalom). However, she uncharacteristically crashed out of those races and then finished ninth in the super-G. In the remaining events, Shiffrin did not win a medal.

Nina O'Brien badly fractured her leg and was hospitalized. Top U.S. downhiller Breezy Johnson also qualified for the team, but had to withdraw due to a knee injury sustained in January.

Men

Athlete	Event	Run 1		Run 2		Total	
Athlete	Event	Time	Rank	Time	Rank	Time	Rank
Bryce Bennett	Downhill	—N/a				1:44.25	19
Ryan Cochran-Siegle	Downhill	—N/a				1:43.91	14
Travis Ganong	Downhill	—N/a				1:44.39	20
Bryce Bennett	Super-G	—N/a				1:21.80	17
Ryan Cochran-Siegle	Super-G	—N/a				1:19.98	2nd place, silver medalist(s)
Travis Ganong	Super-G	—N/a				1:21.37	12
River Radamus	Super-G	—N/a				1:21.63	15
Ryan Cochran-Siegle	Giant slalom	DNF					
Tommy Ford	Giant slalom	1:05.07	19	1:07.34	7	2:12.41	12
River Radamus	Giant slalom	1:03.79	9	1:07.16	5	2:10.95	4
Luke Winters	Giant slalom	DNF					
Luke Winters	Slalom	DNF					

Women

Athlete	Event	Run 1		Run 2		Total	
Athlete	Event	Time	Rank	Time	Rank	Time	Rank
Keely Cashman	Downhill	—N/a				1:34.13	17
Mikaela Shiffrin	Downhill	—N/a				1:34.36	18
Jacqueline Wiles	Downhill	—N/a				1:34.60	21
Alix Wilkinson	Downhill	—N/a				DNF	
Keely Cashman	Super-G	—N/a				1:15.99	27
Mikaela Shiffrin	Super-G	—N/a				1:14.30	9
Alix Wilkinson	Super-G	—N/a				DNF	
Isabella Wright	Super-G	—N/a				1:15.37	21
Keely Cashman	Combined	1:33.09	7	DNF			
Tricia Mangan	Combined	1:35.89	=20	57.05	=8	2:32.94	11
Mikaela Shiffrin	Combined	1:32.98	5	DNF			
Isabella Wright	Combined	1:33.72	15	DNF			
AJ Hurt	Giant slalom	DNF					
Paula Moltzan	Giant slalom	59.57	17	58.50	12	1:58.07	=12
Nina O'Brien	Giant slalom	58.61	6	DSQ			
Mikaela Shiffrin	Giant slalom	DNF					
Katie Hensien	Slalom	55.43	31	53.88	23	1:49.31	26
AJ Hurt	Slalom	56.68	40	55.51	34	1:52.19	34
Paula Moltzan	Slalom	52.79	6	53.39	20	1:46.18	8
Mikaela Shiffrin	Slalom	DNF					

Mixed

Athlete	Event	Round of 16	Quarterfinal	Semifinal	Final / BM	
Athlete	Event	Opposition Result	Opposition Result	Opposition Result	Opposition Result	Rank
Tommy Ford; Paula Moltzan; River Radamus; Mikaela Shiffrin	Team	Slovakia; W 3–1	Italy; W 3–1	Germany; L 1–3	Norway; L 2–2* (+0.42)	4

== Biathlon ==
The United States qualified a team of four men and four women.

Men

Athlete	Event	Time	Misses	Rank
Jake Brown	Sprint	26:04.7	0+2	36
Sean Doherty	Sprint	26:35.2	1+3	47
Leif Nordgren	Sprint	27:31.8	0+3	83
Paul Schommer	Sprint	27:13.3	1+3	74
Jake Brown	Pursuit	45:14.1	3+1+2+0	40
Sean Doherty	Pursuit	45:38.8	1+1+3+2	43
Jake Brown	Individual	52:45.4	0+0+2+0	28
Sean Doherty	Individual	53:55.8	1+1+1+1	42
Leif Nordgren	Individual	59:29.8	2+2+1+2	87
Paul Schommer	Individual	53:27.6	0+1+0+2	35
Jake Brown; Sean Doherty; Leif Nordgren; Paul Schommer	Relay	1:25:33.0	3+13	13

Women

Athlete	Event	Time	Misses	Rank
Susan Dunklee	Sprint	22:39.5	0+0	27
Clare Egan	Sprint	23:16.4	1+2	46
Deedra Irwin	Sprint	23:10.1	0+2	37
Joanne Reid	Sprint	22:54.9	0+2	34
Susan Dunklee	Pursuit	40:18.9	0+0+2+1	40
Clare Egan	Pursuit	40:17.0	0+0+2+2	38
Deedra Irwin	Pursuit	41:01.0	0+0+1+3	47
Joanne Reid	Pursuit	39:06.7	0+0+0+3	29
Susan Dunklee	Individual	51:46.0	1+1+0+2	63
Clare Egan	Individual	49:08.9	1+0+3+1	39
Deedra Irwin	Individual	45:14.1	0+0+0+1	7
Joanne Reid	Individual	51:06.3	0+3+0+2	57
Deedra Irwin	Mass start	43:42.1	1+3+1+1	23
Susan Dunklee; Clare Egan; Deedra Irwin; Joanne Reid	Relay	1:15:51.3	2+9	11

Mixed

Athlete	Event	Time	Misses	Rank
Sean Doherty; Susan Dunklee; Clare Egan; Paul Schommer	Relay	1:08:58.3	1+12	7

== Bobsleigh (bobsled) ==
The United States qualified two sleds each in all four events over the course of the 2021–22 Bobsleigh World Cup.

Men

Athlete	Event	Run 1		Run 2		Run 3		Run 4		Total	
Athlete	Event	Time	Rank	Time	Rank	Time	Rank	Time	Rank	Time	Rank
Hunter Church*; Charlie Volker	Two-man	1:00.38	25	1:01.40	30	1:00.53	25	Did not advance		3:02.31	27
Hakeem Abdul-Saboor; Frank Del Duca*	Two-man	59.87	13	1:00.22	15	59.86	11	1:00.15	12	4:00.10	13
Hunter Church*; Kris Horn; Charlie Volker; Josh Williamson	Four-man	58.91	11	59.70	19	58.96	8	59.49	13	3:57.06	10
Hakeem Abdul-Saboor; Frank Del Duca*; Jimmy Reed; Carlo Valdes	Four-man	59.26	14	59.56	15	59.39	17	59.44	9	3:57.65	13

Women

Athlete	Event	Run 1		Run 2		Run 3		Run 4		Total	
Athlete	Event	Time	Rank	Time	Rank	Time	Rank	Time	Rank	Time	Rank
Kaillie Humphries	Monobob	1:04.44	1	1:04.66	1	1:04.87	1	1:05.30	3	4:19.27	1st place, gold medalist(s)
Elana Meyers Taylor	Monobob	1:05.12	3	1:05.30	3	1:05.28	3	1:05.11	1	4:20.81	2nd place, silver medalist(s)
Kaillie Humphries*; Kaysha Love	Two-Woman	1:01.41	4	1:01.97	9	1:01.75	6	1:01.91	8	4:07.04	7
Sylvia Hoffman; Elana Meyers Taylor*	Two-Woman	1:01.26	3	1:01.53	3	1:01.13	3	1:01.56	3	4:05.48	3rd place, bronze medalist(s)

== Cross-country skiing ==
The United States qualified six male and eight female cross-country skiers.

Distance
Men

Athlete	Event	Classical		Freestyle		Total	
Athlete	Event	Time	Rank	Time	Rank	Time	Rank
Ben Ogden	15 km classical	—N/a				41:29.8	42
Scott Patterson	15 km classical	—N/a				41:23.1	38
JC Schoonmaker	15 km classical	—N/a				43:31.6	66
Gus Schumacher	15 km classical	—N/a				41:53.4	48
Scott Patterson	30 km skiathlon	41:17.4	19	38:18.9	4	1:20:10.0	11
Gus Schumacher	30 km skiathlon	42:26.3	38	42:16.6	44	1:25:14.3	39
Scott Patterson	30 km freestyle	—N/a				1:12:06.6	8
Kevin Bolger; Luke Jager; Scott Patterson; Gus Schumacher	4 × 10 km relay	—N/a				2:02:56.3	9

Women

Athlete	Event	Classical		Freestyle		Total	
Athlete	Event	Time	Rank	Time	Rank	Time	Rank
Rosie Brennan	10 km classical	—N/a				29:28.6	13
Jessie Diggins	10 km classical	—N/a				29:15.1	8
Novie McCabe	10 km classical	—N/a				30:34.9	24
Hailey Swirbul	10 km classical	—N/a				31:05.3	32
Rosie Brennan	15 km skiathlon	23:32.0	13	22:48.8	15	47:05.4	14
Jessie Diggins	15 km skiathlon	23:26.4	11	21:01.8	1	45:04.2	6
Julia Kern	15 km skiathlon	26:31.7	53	24:53.7	55	52:05.5	53
Hailey Swirbul	15 km skiathlon	24:17.6	22	24:45.2	54	49:42.5	40
Rosie Brennan	30 km freestyle	—N/a				1:27:32.7	6
Jessie Diggins	30 km freestyle	—N/a				1:26:37.3	2nd place, silver medalist(s)
Sophia Laukli	30 km freestyle	—N/a				1:31:21.2	15
Novie McCabe	30 km freestyle	—N/a				1:31:22.5	18
Rosie Brennan; Jessie Diggins; Novie McCabe; Hailey Swirbul	4 × 5 km relay	—N/a				55:09.2	6

Sprint
Men

Athlete	Event	Qualification		Quarterfinal		Semifinal		Final	
Athlete	Event	Time	Rank	Time	Rank	Time	Rank	Time	Rank
Kevin Bolger	Sprint	2:52.50	22 Q	2:58.54	4	Did not advance			17
Luke Jager	Sprint	2:54.44	30 Q	2:59.14	5	Did not advance			25
Ben Ogden	Sprint	2:52.21	19 Q	2:53.00	4 q	2:53.41	6	Did not advance	12
JC Schoonmaker	Sprint	2:51.15	13 Q	2:58.13	3	Did not advance			15
Ben Ogden; JC Schoonmaker	Team sprint	—N/a				20:11.42	6 q	20:28.07	9

Qualification legend: Q - Qualify based on position in heat; q - Qualify based on time in field

Women

Athlete	Event	Qualification		Quarterfinal		Semifinal		Final	
Athlete	Event	Time	Rank	Time	Rank	Time	Rank	Time	Rank
Rosie Brennan	Sprint	3:14.83	2 Q	3:17.90	2 Q	3:13.29	4 q	3:14.17	4
Jessie Diggins	Sprint	3:17.72	5 Q	3:16.30	1 Q	3:15.63	2 Q	3:12.84	3rd place, bronze medalist(s)
Hannah Halvorsen	Sprint	3:29.13	43	Did not advance					
Julia Kern	Sprint	3:20.69	14 Q	3:21.68	4	Did not advance			18
Rosie Brennan; Jessie Diggins	Team sprint	—N/a				23:06.1	2 Q	22:22.7	5

Qualification legend: Q - Qualify based on position in heat; q - Qualify based on time in field

== Curling ==
Summary

Team	Event	Group stage										Semifinal	Final / BM	
Team	Event	Opposition Score	Opposition Score	Opposition Score	Opposition Score	Opposition Score	Opposition Score	Opposition Score	Opposition Score	Opposition Score	Rank	Opposition Score	Opposition Score	Rank
Matt Hamilton; Colin Hufman; John Landsteiner; Chris Plys; John Shuster (S)	Men's tournament	ROC; W 6–5	SWE; L 4–7	GBR; W 9–7	NOR; L 6–7	CAN; L 5–10	CHN; W 8–6	SUI; W 7–4	ITA; L 4–10	DEN; W 7–5	4 Q	GBR; L 4–8	CAN; L 5–8	4
Aileen Geving; Becca Hamilton; Tabitha Peterson (S); Tara Peterson; Nina Roth	Women's tournament	ROC; W 9–3	DEN; W 7–5	CHN; W 8–4	GBR; L 5–10	SWE; L 4–10	KOR; W 8–6	SUI; L 6–9	CAN; L 6–7	JPN; L 7–10	6	Did not advance		
Vicky Persinger; Chris Plys	Mixed doubles tournament	AUS; W 6–5	ITA; L 4–8	NOR; L 6–11	SWE; W 8–7	CHN; W 7–5	CAN; L 2–7	CZE; L 8–10	SUI; L 5–6	GBR; L 4–8	8	Did not advance		

=== Men's tournament ===
The United States qualified their men's team (five athletes), by finishing in the top six teams in the 2021 World Men's Curling Championship. Team John Shuster qualified as United States representatives by winning the 2021 United States Olympic Curling Trials, defeating Korey Dropkin 2–1 in the best-of-three final.

Final Round Robin Standings
Team	Skip	Pld	W	L	W–L	PF	PA	EW	EL	BE	SE	S%	DSC	Qualification
Great Britain	Bruce Mouat	9	8	1	–	63	44	39	31	5	10	88.0%	18.81	Playoffs
Sweden	Niklas Edin	9	7	2	–	64	44	43	30	10	11	85.7%	14.02	Playoffs
Canada	Brad Gushue	9	5	4	1–0	58	50	34	38	7	7	84.4%	26.49	Playoffs
United States	John Shuster	9	5	4	0–1	56	61	35	41	4	5	83.0%	32.29	Playoffs
China	Ma Xiuyue	9	4	5	2–1; 1–0	59	62	39	36	6	4	85.4%	23.55	
Norway	Steffen Walstad	9	4	5	2–1; 0–1	58	53	40	36	0	11	84.4%	20.96	
Switzerland	Peter de Cruz	9	4	5	1–2; 1–0	51	54	33	38	13	3	84.5%	15.74	
ROC	Sergey Glukhov	9	4	5	1–2; 0–1	58	58	33	38	6	6	81.2%	33.72	
Italy	Joël Retornaz	9	3	6	–	59	65	36	35	3	8	81.7%	30.76	
Denmark	Mikkel Krause	9	1	8	–	36	71	30	39	3	2	78.1%	32.84	

Round robin
The United States had a bye in draws 4, 8, and 11.

Draw 1
Wednesday, February 9, 20:05

Sheet B	1	2	3	4	5	6	7	8	9	10	11	Final
United States (Shuster) 🔨	1	0	0	0	1	1	0	2	0	0	1	6
ROC (Glukhov)	0	0	1	2	0	0	1	0	0	1	0	5

Draw 2
Thursday, February 10, 14:05

Sheet A	1	2	3	4	5	6	7	8	9	10	Final
United States (Shuster) 🔨	1	0	1	0	0	2	0	0	0	X	4
Sweden (Edin)	0	2	0	2	1	0	1	1	0	X	7

Draw 3
Friday, February 11, 9:05

Sheet B	1	2	3	4	5	6	7	8	9	10	Final
Great Britain (Mouat)	0	0	2	0	2	2	0	1	0	X	7
United States (Shuster) 🔨	0	2	0	3	0	0	2	0	2	X	9

Draw 5
Saturday, February 12, 14:05

Sheet D	1	2	3	4	5	6	7	8	9	10	Final
United States (Shuster)	0	2	0	1	0	0	2	0	0	1	6
Norway (Walstad) 🔨	1	0	1	0	2	2	0	1	0	0	7

Draw 6
Sunday, February 13, 9:05

Sheet C	1	2	3	4	5	6	7	8	9	10	Final
United States (Shuster)	0	0	1	0	0	3	0	1	0	X	5
Canada (Gushue) 🔨	1	4	0	1	1	0	1	0	2	X	10

Draw 7
Sunday, February 13, 20:05

Sheet D	1	2	3	4	5	6	7	8	9	10	Final
China (Ma) 🔨	1	0	1	0	1	0	0	2	1	0	6
United States (Shuster)	0	2	0	3	0	2	0	0	0	1	8

Draw 9
Tuesday, February 15, 9:05

Sheet C	1	2	3	4	5	6	7	8	9	10	Final
Switzerland (de Cruz) 🔨	1	0	0	1	0	2	0	0	0	X	4
United States (Shuster)	0	2	0	0	1	0	2	1	1	X	7

Draw 10
Tuesday, February 16, 20:05

Sheet B	1	2	3	4	5	6	7	8	9	10	Final
Italy (Retornaz) 🔨	1	0	2	0	2	0	1	4	X	X	10
United States (Shuster)	0	2	0	1	0	1	0	0	X	X	4

Draw 12
Thursday, February 17, 9:05

Sheet A	1	2	3	4	5	6	7	8	9	10	Final
Denmark (Krause) 🔨	1	1	0	0	1	0	0	0	2	X	5
United States (Shuster)	0	0	2	3	0	0	1	1	0	X	7

Semifinal
Thursday, February 17, 20:05

Sheet C	1	2	3	4	5	6	7	8	9	10	Final
United States (Shuster)	0	2	0	2	0	0	0	0	0	0	4
Great Britain (Mouat) 🔨	0	0	3	0	2	0	0	0	1	2	8

Bronze medal game
Friday, February 18, 14:05

Sheet B	1	2	3	4	5	6	7	8	9	10	Final
Canada (Gushue) 🔨	2	0	1	0	1	0	0	2	2	X	8
United States (Shuster)	0	1	0	2	0	2	0	0	0	X	5

=== Women's tournament ===
The United States qualified their women's team (five athletes), by finishing in the top six teams in the 2021 World Women's Curling Championship. Team Tabitha Peterson qualified as United States representatives by winning the 2021 United States Olympic Curling Trials, defeating Cory Christensen 2–0 in the best-of-three final.

Final Round Robin Standings
Team	Skip	Pld	W	L	W–L	PF	PA	EW	EL	BE	SE	S%	DSC	Qualification
Switzerland	Silvana Tirinzoni	9	8	1	–	67	46	44	36	4	12	81.6%	19.14	Playoffs
Sweden	Anna Hasselborg	9	7	2	–	64	49	39	35	6	12	82.0%	25.02	Playoffs
Great Britain	Eve Muirhead	9	5	4	1–1	63	47	39	33	4	9	80.6%	35.27	Playoffs
Japan	Satsuki Fujisawa	9	5	4	1–1	64	62	40	36	2	13	82.3%	36.00	Playoffs
Canada	Jennifer Jones	9	5	4	1–1	71	59	42	41	1	14	80.4%	45.44	
United States	Tabitha Peterson	9	4	5	2–0	60	64	40	39	2	12	79.5%	33.87	
China	Han Yu	9	4	5	1–1	56	67	38	41	3	10	79.6%	30.06	
South Korea	Kim Eun-jung	9	4	5	0–2	62	66	40	42	3	10	80.8%	27.79	
Denmark	Madeleine Dupont	9	2	7	–	50	68	33	41	7	0	77.2%	23.36	
ROC	Alina Kovaleva	9	1	8	–	50	79	34	45	2	7	78.9%	29.34	

Round robin
The United States had a bye in draws 4, 8, and 12.

Draw 1
Thursday, February 10, 9:05

Sheet D	1	2	3	4	5	6	7	8	9	10	Final
ROC (Kovaleva)	0	1	0	0	0	2	0	X	X	X	3
United States (Peterson) 🔨	2	0	1	1	2	0	3	X	X	X	9

Draw 2
Thursday, February 10, 20:05

Sheet C	1	2	3	4	5	6	7	8	9	10	Final
United States (Peterson)	1	0	2	0	0	1	0	2	0	1	7
Denmark (Dupont) 🔨	0	1	0	2	0	0	1	0	1	0	5

Draw 3
Friday, February 11, 14:05

Sheet A	1	2	3	4	5	6	7	8	9	10	Final
United States (Peterson)	2	0	1	1	1	1	0	2	0	X	8
China (Han) 🔨	0	1	0	0	0	0	2	0	1	X	4

Draw 5
Saturday, February 12, 20:05

Sheet C	1	2	3	4	5	6	7	8	9	10	Final
Great Britain (Muirhead) 🔨	2	2	0	0	1	0	2	0	3	X	10
United States (Peterson)	0	0	0	2	0	2	0	1	0	X	5

Draw 6
Sunday, February 13, 14:05

Sheet B	1	2	3	4	5	6	7	8	9	10	Final
United States (Peterson)	0	0	2	1	0	0	1	0	0	X	4
Sweden (Hasselborg) 🔨	0	2	0	0	1	2	0	2	3	X	10

Draw 7
Monday, February 14, 9:05

Sheet D	1	2	3	4	5	6	7	8	9	10	Final
United States (Peterson)	0	0	1	0	1	3	0	2	0	1	8
South Korea (Kim) 🔨	0	1	0	1	0	0	2	0	2	0	6

Draw 9
Tuesday, February 15, 14:05

Sheet C	1	2	3	4	5	6	7	8	9	10	Final
United States (Peterson) 🔨	1	0	1	1	0	1	0	2	0	0	6
Switzerland (Tirinzoni)	0	2	0	0	1	0	1	0	4	1	9

Draw 10
Wednesday, February 16, 9:05

Sheet A	1	2	3	4	5	6	7	8	9	10	Final
Canada (Jones)	0	2	2	0	0	1	1	0	0	1	7
United States (Peterson) 🔨	1	0	0	1	1	0	0	2	1	0	6

Draw 11
Wednesday, February 16, 20:05

Sheet B	1	2	3	4	5	6	7	8	9	10	Final
Japan (Fujisawa) 🔨	1	3	0	2	0	1	0	2	1	X	10
United States (Peterson)	0	0	2	0	1	0	4	0	0	X	7

=== Mixed doubles tournament ===
The United States qualified their mixed doubles team (two athletes), by finishing in the top two teams in the 2021 Olympic Qualification Event. Vicky Persinger and Chris Plys qualified as the United States representatives by winning the 2021 United States Mixed Doubles Curling Olympic Trials, defeating Jamie Sinclair and Rich Ruohonen 7–6 in the final.

Final Round Robin Standings
Team	Athletes	Pld	W	L	W–L	PF	PA	EW	EL	BE	SE	S%	DSC	Qualification
Italy	Stefania Constantini / Amos Mosaner	9	9	0	–	79	48	43	28	0	17	79%	25.34	Playoffs
Norway	Kristin Skaslien / Magnus Nedregotten	9	6	3	1–0	68	50	40	28	0	15	82%	24.48	Playoffs
Great Britain	Jennifer Dodds / Bruce Mouat	9	6	3	0–1	60	50	38	33	0	12	79%	22.48	Playoffs
Sweden	Almida de Val / Oskar Eriksson	9	5	4	1–0	55	54	35	33	0	10	76%	21.77	Playoffs
Canada	Rachel Homan / John Morris	9	5	4	0–1	57	54	33	39	0	8	78%	53.73	
Czech Republic	Zuzana Paulová / Tomáš Paul	9	4	5	–	50	65	29	39	1	7	75%	33.41	
Switzerland	Jenny Perret / Martin Rios	9	3	6	1–0	55	58	32	39	0	6	73%	39.04	
United States	Vicky Persinger / Chris Plys	9	3	6	0–1	50	67	34	36	0	9	74%	27.29	
China	Fan Suyuan / Ling Zhi	9	2	7	1–0	51	64	34	36	0	7	74%	17.81	
Australia	Tahli Gill / Dean Hewitt	9	2	7	0–1	52	67	31	38	1	8	72%	50.51	

Round robin
The United States had a bye in draws 4, 5, 7, and 11.

Draw 1
Wednesday, February 2, 20:05

Sheet B	1	2	3	4	5	6	7	8	Final
Australia (Gill / Hewitt) 🔨	1	0	1	0	0	3	0	0	5
United States (Persinger / Plys)	0	1	0	1	1	0	2	1	6

Draw 2
Thursday, February 3, 9:05

Sheet C	1	2	3	4	5	6	7	8	Final
United States (Persinger / Plys) 🔨	1	0	0	1	1	1	0	0	4
Italy (Constantini / Mosaner)	0	4	1	0	0	0	1	2	8

Draw 3
Thursday, February 3, 14:05

Sheet B	1	2	3	4	5	6	7	8	Final
United States (Persinger / Plys) 🔨	1	0	2	0	3	0	0	0	6
Norway (Skaslien / Nedregotten)	0	1	0	2	0	3	3	2	11

Draw 6
Friday, February 4, 13:35

Sheet D	1	2	3	4	5	6	7	8	9	Final
Sweden (de Val / Eriksson) 🔨	1	0	1	0	0	3	0	2	0	7
United States (Persinger / Plys)	0	1	0	1	2	0	3	0	1	8

Draw 8
Saturday, February 5, 14:05

Sheet A	1	2	3	4	5	6	7	8	Final
China (Fan / Ling)	0	1	0	2	0	2	0	X	5
United States (Persinger / Plys) 🔨	2	0	1	0	3	0	1	X	7

Draw 9
Saturday, February 5, 20:05

Sheet D	1	2	3	4	5	6	7	8	Final
United States (Persinger / Plys) 🔨	1	0	1	0	0	0	0	X	2
Canada (Homan / Morris)	0	1	0	1	1	1	3	X	7

Draw 10
Sunday, February 6, 9:05

Sheet A	1	2	3	4	5	6	7	8	Final
United States (Persinger / Plys)	1	0	3	0	3	0	1	0	8
Czech Republic (Paulová / Paul) 🔨	0	3	0	4	0	0	0	3	10

Draw 12
Sunday, February 6, 20:05

Sheet C	1	2	3	4	5	6	7	8	Final
Switzerland (Perret / Rios) 🔨	3	0	0	1	0	1	0	1	6
United States (Persinger / Plys)	0	1	1	0	1	0	2	0	5

Draw 13
Monday, February 7, 9:05

Sheet C	1	2	3	4	5	6	7	8	Final
United States (Persinger / Plys) 🔨	0	1	0	0	2	1	0	0	4
Great Britain (Dodds / Mouat)	3	0	1	1	0	0	1	2	8

== Figure skating ==
In the 2021 World Figure Skating Championships in Stockholm, Sweden, the United States secured two quotas in the men's, ladies', and pairs competitions, and three quotas in the ice dance competition. Third quotas for men's and ladies' were secured at the 2021 CS Nebelhorn Trophy.

Vincent Zhou withdrew from the men's singles event due to a positive COVID-19 test.

The U.S. won silver medals in the team event, which were not awarded at the Olympics due to pending investigation into a Russian doping scandal involving gold medalist Kamila Valieva. The investigation concluded in early 2024, with the Court of Arbitration for Sport (CAS) disqualifying Valieva and recommending the International Olympic Committee (IOC) to upgrade the U.S. team to gold, which it did, bringing the country's gold medal tally to nine.

Individual

Athlete	Event	SP		FS		Total	
Athlete	Event	Points	Rank	Points	Rank	Points	Rank
Jason Brown	Men's singles	97.24	6 Q	184.00	6	281.24	6
Nathan Chen	Men's singles	113.97 WR	1 Q	218.63	1	332.60	1st place, gold medalist(s)
Vincent Zhou	Men's singles	DNS		Did not advance			
Mariah Bell	Women's singles	65.38	10 Q	136.92	7	202.30	9
Karen Chen	Women's singles	64.11	12 Q	115.82	16	179.94	15
Alysa Liu	Women's singles	69.50	7 Q	139.45	6	208.95	6

Mixed

Athlete	Event	SP / RD		FS / FD		Total	
Athlete	Event	Points	Rank	Points	Rank	Points	Rank
Ashley Cain-Gribble; Timothy LeDuc	Pairs	74.13	7 Q	123.92	9	198.05	8
Alexa Knierim; Brandon Frazier	Pairs	74.23	6 Q	138.45	7	212.68	6
Madison Chock; Evan Bates	Ice dance	84.14	4 Q	130.63	4	214.77	4
Kaitlin Hawayek; Jean-Luc Baker	Ice dance	74.58	11 Q	115.16	10	189.74	11
Madison Hubbell; Zachary Donohue	Ice dance	87.13	3 Q	130.89	3	218.02	3rd place, bronze medalist(s)

Team

Athlete	Event	Short program / Rhythm dance						Free skate / Free dance				Total	
Athlete	Event	Men's	Ladies'	Pairs	Ice dancing	Total		Men's	Ladies'	Pairs	Ice dancing	Total	
Athlete	Event	Points Team points	Points Team points	Points Team points	Points Team points	Points	Rank	Points Team points	Points Team points	Points Team points	Points Team points	Points	Rank
Nathan Chen (M) (SP); Vincent Zhou (M) (FS); Karen Chen (W); Alexa Knierim / Brandon Frazier (P); Madison Hubbell / Zachary Donohue (ID) (RD); Madison Chock / Evan Bates (ID) (FD)	Team event	111.71; 10	65.20; 6	75.00; 8	86.56; 10	34	2 Q	171.44; 8	131.52; 7	128.97; 6	129.07; 10	65	1st place, gold medalist(s)

== Freestyle skiing ==
The United States qualified a full team of 16 men and 16 women as well as a position in the mixed team aerials event.

Aerials
Men

Athlete	Event	Qualification				Final			
Athlete	Event	Jump 1		Jump 2		Jump 1		Jump 2	
Athlete	Event	Points	Rank	Points	Rank	Points	Rank	Points	Rank
Christopher Lillis	Aerials	119.91	6 Q	Bye		125.67	3 Q	103.00	6
Eric Loughran	Aerials	121.24	4 Q	Bye		111.95	12	Did not advance	
Justin Schoenefeld	Aerials	118.59	8	105.88	5 Q	123.53	6 Q	106.50	5

Women

Athlete	Event	Qualification				Final			
Athlete	Event	Jump 1		Jump 2		Jump 1		Jump 2	
Athlete	Event	Points	Rank	Points	Rank	Points	Rank	Points	Rank
Ashley Caldwell	Aerials	101.31	2 Q	Bye		105.60	1 Q	83.71	4
Kaila Kuhn	Aerials	84.24	8	86.62	3 Q	85.68	8	Did not advance	
Megan Nick	Aerials	89.18	7	89.18	2 Q	95.17	5 Q	93.76	3rd place, bronze medalist(s)
Winter Vinecki	Aerials	78.96	13	78.96	9	Did not advance			15

Mixed

Athlete	Event	Jump 1		Jump 2	
Athlete	Event	Points	Rank	Points	Rank
Ashley Caldwell; Christopher Lillis; Justin Schoenefeld	Team aerials	330.55	2 Q	338.34	1st place, gold medalist(s)

Freeskiing
Men

Athlete	Event	Qualification					Final				
Athlete	Event	Run 1	Run 2	Run 3	Best	Rank	Run 1	Run 2	Run 3	Best	Rank
Mac Forehand	Big air	77.75	92.00	79.00	171.00	8 Q	60.75	19.50	42.00	80.25	11
Nick Goepper	Big air	78.25	49.50	21.75	127.75	22	Did not advance				
Alex Hall	Big air	87.00	90.75	89.50	180.25	2 Q	68.25	92.50	27.00	160.75	8
Colby Stevenson	Big air	83.75	90.50	56.00	174.25	5 Q	34.75	91.75	91.25	183.00	2nd place, silver medalist(s)
Aaron Blunck	Halfpipe	26.25	92.00	—N/a	92.00	1 Q	70.25	78.25	13.50	78.25	7
Alex Ferreira	Halfpipe	84.25	69.50	—N/a	84.25	7 Q	86.75	83.75	67.75	86.75	3rd place, bronze medalist(s)
Birk Irving	Halfpipe	83.25	89.75	—N/a	89.75	3 Q	80.00	32.50	48.00	80.00	5
David Wise	Halfpipe	88.75	89.00	—N/a	89.00	4 Q	90.75	7.75	40.00	90.75	2nd place, silver medalist(s)
Mac Forehand	Slopestyle	51.21	37.80	—N/a	51.21	20	Did not advance				
Nick Goepper	Slopestyle	82.51	80.23	—N/a	82.51	3 Q	45.75	86.48	53.45	86.48	2nd place, silver medalist(s)
Alex Hall	Slopestyle	79.13	40.60	—N/a	79.13	5 Q	90.01	86.38	31.41	90.01	1st place, gold medalist(s)
Colby Stevenson	Slopestyle	78.01	35.80	—N/a	78.01	6 Q	74.48	41.73	55.18	74.48	7

Women

Athlete	Event	Qualification					Final				
Athlete	Event	Run 1	Run 2	Run 3	Best	Rank	Run 1	Run 2	Run 3	Best	Rank
Caroline Claire	Big air	20.00	17.25	DNS	20.00	24	Did not advance				
Marin Hamill	Big air	61.50	66.00	66.25	132.25	14	Did not advance				
Darian Stevens	Big air	84.75	10.00	67.25	152.00	8 Q	56.75	50.75	18.25	75.00	11
Maggie Voisin	Big air	16.25	60.00	68.00	128.00	15	Did not advance				
Hanna Faulhaber	Halfpipe	84.25	82.00	—N/a	84.25	9 Q	85.25	84.50	19.00	85.25	6
Devin Logan	Halfpipe	71.00	62.00	—N/a	71.00	13	Did not advance				
Carly Margulies	Halfpipe	79.00	82.25	—N/a	82.25	10 Q	24.75	1.75	61.00	61.00	11
Brita Sigourney	Halfpipe	80.50	84.50	—N/a	84.50	8 Q	70.75	60.00	12.25	70.75	10
Caroline Claire	Slopestyle	DNS		—N/a	DNS		Did not advance				
Marin Hamill	Slopestyle	69.43	37.36	—N/a	69.43	7 Q	DNS				
Darian Stevens	Slopestyle	6.18	50.01	—N/a	50.01	18	Did not advance				
Maggie Voisin	Slopestyle	72.78	65.93	—N/a	72.78	4 Q	35.48	74.28	66.03	74.28	5

Moguls
Men

Athlete	Event	Qualification								Final											
Athlete	Event	Run 1				Run 2				Run 1				Run 2				Run 3			
Athlete	Event	Time	Points	Total	Rank	Time	Points	Total	Rank	Time	Points	Total	Rank	Time	Points	Total	Rank	Time	Points	Total	Rank
Cole McDonald	Moguls	25.41	61.78	76.27	5 Q	Bye				25.29	61.13	75.78	14	Did not advance							
Nick Page	Moguls	24.36	54.83	70.71	21	25.30	62.72	77.36	3 Q	25.98	63.06	76.80	10 Q	25.63	62.72	76.92	6 Q	25.68	64.76	78.90	5
Dylan Walczyk	Moguls	25.03	60.87	75.86	10 Q	Bye				25.13	60.27	75.13	16	Did not advance							
Bradley Wilson	Moguls	DNF				25.29	58.29	72.94	15	Did not advance											25

Women

Athlete	Event	Qualification								Final											
Athlete	Event	Run 1				Run 2				Run 1				Run 2				Run 3			
Athlete	Event	Time	Points	Total	Rank	Time	Points	Total	Rank	Time	Points	Total	Rank	Time	Points	Total	Rank	Time	Points	Total	Rank
Olivia Giaccio	Moguls	29.56	63.42	78.11	4 Q	Bye				29.73	63.87	78.37	5 Q	29.50	62.81	77.57	6 Q	29.60	60.97	75.61	6
Jaelin Kauf	Moguls	26.97	61.54	79.15	3 Q	Bye				27.00	65.75	79.32	4 Q	26.49	61.97	80.12	2 Q	26.37	62.00	80.28	2nd place, silver medalist(s)
Kai Owens	Moguls	DNS				29.67	55.36	69.92	8 Q	28.34	59.20	75.26	6 Q	28.54	49.65	65.49	10	Did not advance			
Hannah Soar	Moguls	29.25	59.49	74.53	7 Q	Bye				29.70	59.17	73.70	11 Q	28.95	59.78	75.16	7	Did not advance			

Ski cross

Athlete	Event	Seeding		1/8 final	Quarterfinal	Semifinal	Final	
Athlete	Event	Time	Rank	Position	Position	Position	Position	Rank
Tyler Wallasch	Men's ski cross	1:13.55	24	4	Did not advance			28

== Ice hockey ==
The United States qualified 25 male and 23 female competitors to the ice hockey tournaments as part of the country's two teams.

Summary

Team	Event	Group play					Playoff	Quarterfinal	Semifinal	Final / BM	
Team	Event	Opposition Result	Opposition Result	Opposition Result	Opposition Result	Rank	Opposition Result	Opposition Result	Opposition Result	Opposition Result	Rank
United States men	Men's tournament	China; W 8–0	Canada; W 4–2	Germany; W 3–2	—N/a	1 QQ	Bye	Slovakia; L 2–3 SO	Did not advance		5
United States women	Women's tournament	Finland; W 5–2	ROC; W 5–0	Switzerland; W 8–0	Canada; L 2–4	2 Q	—N/a	Czech Republic; W 4–1	Finland; W 4–1	Canada; L 2–3	2nd place, silver medalist(s)

=== Men's tournament ===
The United States men's national ice hockey team qualified by being ranked 6th in the 2019 IIHF World Rankings.

Team roster The following is the American roster in the men's ice hockey tournament of the 2022 Winter Olympics. The roster was announced on January 13, 2022.

Head coach: David Quinn

No.	Pos.	Name	Height	Weight	Birthdate	Team
4	D	Drew Helleson	6 ft 3 in (191 cm)	190 lb (86 kg)	March 26, 2001 (aged 20)	(United States) Boston College Eagles
5	D	David Warsofsky	5 ft 9 in (175 cm)	171 lb (78 kg)	May 30, 1990 (aged 31)	(Germany) ERC Ingolstadt
6	D	Nick Perbix	6 ft 4 in (193 cm)	201 lb (91 kg)	June 15, 1998 (aged 23)	(United States) St. Cloud State Huskies
8	D	Jake Sanderson	6 ft 2 in (188 cm)	185 lb (84 kg)	July 8, 2002 (aged 19)	(United States) North Dakota Fighting Hawks
10	F	Matty Beniers	6 ft 1 in (185 cm)	175 lb (79 kg)	November 5, 2002 (aged 19)	(United States) Michigan Wolverines
11	F	Kenny Agostino	6 ft 0 in (183 cm)	202 lb (92 kg)	April 30, 1992 (aged 29)	(Russia) Torpedo Nizhny Novgorod
12	F	Sam Hentges	6 ft 0 in (183 cm)	174 lb (79 kg)	July 26, 1999 (aged 22)	(United States) St. Cloud State Huskies
13	F	Nathan Smith	6 ft 1 in (185 cm)	190 lb (86 kg)	October 18, 1998 (aged 23)	(United States) Minnesota State Mavericks
14	D	Brock Faber	6 ft 0 in (183 cm)	190 lb (86 kg)	August 22, 2002 (aged 19)	(United States) Minnesota Golden Gophers
16	F	Nick Abruzzese	5 ft 10 in (178 cm)	174 lb (79 kg)	June 4, 1999 (aged 22)	(United States) Harvard Crimson
19	F	Brendan Brisson	6 ft 0 in (183 cm)	180 lb (82 kg)	October 22, 2001 (aged 20)	(United States) Michigan Wolverines
20	D	Steven Kampfer (A)	5 ft 11 in (180 cm)	197 lb (89 kg)	September 24, 1988 (aged 33)	(Russia) Ak Bars Kazan
21	F	Brian O'Neill	5 ft 9 in (175 cm)	175 lb (79 kg)	June 1, 1988 (aged 33)	(Finland) Jokerit
23	D	Brian Cooper	5 ft 10 in (178 cm)	196 lb (89 kg)	November 1, 1993 (aged 28)	(Sweden) IK Oskarshamn
25	F	Marc McLaughlin	6 ft 0 in (183 cm)	205 lb (93 kg)	July 26, 1999 (aged 22)	(United States) Boston College Eagles
26	F	Sean Farrell	5 ft 9 in (175 cm)	174 lb (79 kg)	November 2, 2001 (aged 20)	(United States) Harvard Crimson
27	F	Noah Cates (A)	6 ft 2 in (188 cm)	188 lb (85 kg)	February 5, 1999 (aged 23)	(United States) Minnesota Duluth Bulldogs
29	G	Drew Commesso	6 ft 2 in (188 cm)	181 lb (82 kg)	July 19, 2002 (aged 19)	(United States) Boston University Terriers
31	G	Strauss Mann	6 ft 0 in (183 cm)	174 lb (79 kg)	August 18, 1998 (aged 23)	(Sweden) Skellefteå AIK
35	G	Pat Nagle	6 ft 3 in (191 cm)	185 lb (84 kg)	September 21, 1987 (aged 34)	(United States) Lehigh Valley Phantoms
37	F	Nick Shore	6 ft 1 in (185 cm)	195 lb (88 kg)	September 26, 1992 (aged 29)	(Russia) HC Sibir Novosibirsk
39	F	Ben Meyers	5 ft 11 in (180 cm)	194 lb (88 kg)	November 15, 1998 (aged 23)	(United States) Minnesota Golden Gophers
42	D	Aaron Ness	5 ft 10 in (178 cm)	170 lb (77 kg)	May 18, 1990 (aged 31)	(United States) Providence Bruins
51	F	Andy Miele (C)	5 ft 7 in (170 cm)	169 lb (77 kg)	April 15, 1988 (aged 33)	(Russia) Torpedo Nizhny Novgorod
67	F	Matthew Knies	6 ft 3 in (191 cm)	212 lb (96 kg)	October 17, 2002 (aged 19)	(United States) Minnesota Golden Gophers
89	F	Justin Abdelkader	6 ft 2 in (188 cm)	212 lb (96 kg)	January 25, 1987 (aged 35)	(United States) Grand Rapids Griffins

Group play

Pos	Team	Pld	W	OTW	OTL	L	GF	GA	GD	Pts	Qualification
1	United States	3	3	0	0	0	15	4	+11	9	Quarterfinals
2	Canada	3	2	0	0	1	12	5	+7	6	Playoffs
3	Germany	3	1	0	0	2	6	10	−4	3	Playoffs
4	China (H)	3	0	0	0	3	2	16	−14	0	Playoffs

Source: IIHF
Rules for classification: Preliminary round tiebreakers
(H) Host

February 10, 2022; 21:10 v	United States	8–0 (1–0, 3–0, 4–0)	China	Beijing National Indoor Stadium, Beijing; Attendance: 947

Game reference

Drew Commesso
Goalies
Jeremy Smith
Referees:
(Finland) Mikko Kaukokari
(Switzerland) Michael Tscherrig
Linesmen:
(Finland) Lauri Nikulainen
(Russia) Dmitri Shishlo

Brisson (Knies) (PP) – 10:38	1–0
Cates (Farrell, Meyers) – 25:32	2–0
O'Neill (Miele, Faber) – 31:13	3–0
Farrell (Abruzzese) – 38:07	4–0
Farrell (Kampfer, Meyers) – 41:06	5–0
Meyers (Farrell) – 50:19	6–0
Beniers (Abruzzese, Cooper) – 52:00	7–0
Farrell (Abdelkader, Helleson) (PP) – 58:27	8–0

10 min
Penalties
10 min
55
Shots
29

February 12, 2022; 12:10 v	Canada	2–4 (1–2, 1–1, 0–1)	United States	Beijing National Indoor Stadium, Beijing; Attendance: 948

Game reference

Edward Pasquale
Goalies
Strauss Mann
Referees:
(Latvia) Andris Ansons
(Sweden) Tobias Björk
Linesmen:
(Czech Republic) Daniel Hynek
(Canada) Dustin McCrank

Robinson (Ho-Sang, Staal) – 01:24	1–0
	1–1	02:34 – Miele (O'Neill, Kampfer)
	1–2	18:44 – Meyers (Farrell, Sanderson)
	1–3	22:37 – Brisson (Shore)
Knight (Winnik) (SH) – 34:13	2–3
	2–4	46:13 – Agostino (Miele)

4 min
Penalties
6 min
37
Shots
27

February 13, 2022; 21:10 v	United States	3–2 (1–1, 1–0, 1–1)	Germany	Wukesong Arena, Beijing; Attendance: 708

Game reference

Drew Commesso
Goalies
Danny aus den Birken
Referees:
(Russia) Evgenii Romasko
(Belarus) Maxim Sidorenko
Linesmen:
(Switzerland) David Obwegeser
(Czech Republic) Jiří Ondráček

	0–1	02:00 – Hager (Plachta, Kahun) (PP)
Kampfer (Miele, O'Neill) (PP) – 04:26	1–1
Knies (Abruzzese, Ness) – 24:50	2–1
Smith – 42:47	3–1
	3–2	57:31 – Kühnhackl (Bergmann, Müller)

12 min
Penalties
10 min
32
Shots
26

Quarterfinals

February 16, 2022; 12:10 v	United States	2–3 GWS (1–1, 1–0, 0–1) (OT: 0–0) (SO: 0–1)	Slovakia	Beijing National Indoor Stadium, Beijing; Attendance: 1,059

Game reference

Strauss Mann
Goalies
Patrik Rybár
Referees:
(Sweden) Tobias Björk
(Russia) Roman Gofman
Linesmen:
(Canada) Dustin McCrank
(Russia) Nikita Shalagin

	0–1	11:45 – Slafkovský (Čerešňák, Regenda)
Abruzzese (Beniers, Kampfer) – 19:14	1–1
Hentges (Perbix, Smith) – 28:56	2–1
	2–2	59:16 – Hrivík (Čajkovský, Hudáček) (EA)

Brisson (miss)
Farrell (miss)
Knies (miss)
Smith (miss)
Miele (miss)
Shootout
(miss) Hudáček
(miss) Čajkovský
(miss) Krištof
Cehlárik
2 min
Penalties
10 min
35
Shots
37

=== Women's tournament ===
The United States women's national ice hockey team qualified by being ranked 1st in the 2020 IIHF World Rankings.

Team roster The roster was announced on 2 January 2022.

Head coach: Joel Johnson

No.	Pos.	Name	Height	Weight	Birthdate	Birthplace	Team
2	D	Lee Stecklein	1.83 m (6 ft 0 in)	77 kg (170 lb)	23 April 1994 (aged 27)	Roseville, Minnesota	(United States) PWHPA Minnesota
3	D	Cayla Barnes	1.57 m (5 ft 2 in)	63 kg (139 lb)	7 January 1999 (aged 23)	Corona, California	(United States) Boston College Eagles
4	D	Caroline Harvey	1.70 m (5 ft 7 in)	73 kg (161 lb)	14 October 2002 (aged 19)	Pelham, New Hampshire	(United States) North American Hockey Academy
5	D	Megan Keller	1.80 m (5 ft 11 in)	75 kg (165 lb)	1 May 1996 (aged 25)	Farmington Hills, Michigan	(United States) PWHPA New Hampshire
9	D	Megan Bozek	1.73 m (5 ft 8 in)	80 kg (180 lb)	27 March 1991 (aged 30)	Buffalo Grove, Illinois	(China) KRS Vanke Rays
11	F	Abby Roque	1.70 m (5 ft 7 in)	82 kg (181 lb)	25 September 1997 (aged 24)	Sault Ste. Marie, Michigan	(United States) PWHPA Minnesota
12	F	Kelly Pannek	1.73 m (5 ft 8 in)	75 kg (165 lb)	29 December 1995 (aged 26)	Plymouth, Minnesota	(United States) PWHPA Minnesota
13	F	Grace Zumwinkle	1.75 m (5 ft 9 in)	75 kg (165 lb)	23 April 1999 (aged 22)	Excelsior, Minnesota	(United States) Minnesota Golden Gophers
14	F	Brianna Decker *	1.63 m (5 ft 4 in)	67 kg (148 lb)	13 May 1991 (aged 30)	Dousman, Wisconsin	(United States) PWHPA New Hampshire
15	D	Savannah Harmon	1.60 m (5 ft 3 in)	67 kg (148 lb)	27 October 1995 (aged 26)	Downers Grove, Illinois	(United States) PWHPA Minnesota
16	F	Hayley Scamurra	1.73 m (5 ft 8 in)	73 kg (161 lb)	14 December 1994 (aged 27)	Buffalo, New York	(United States) PWHPA New Hampshire
18	F	Jesse Compher	1.73 m (5 ft 8 in)	68 kg (150 lb)	1 July 1999 (aged 22)	Northbrook, Illinois	(United States) Boston University Terriers
19	D	Jincy Roese	1.68 m (5 ft 6 in)	70 kg (150 lb)	15 May 1997 (aged 24)	O'Fallon, Missouri	(United States) PWHPA New Hampshire
20	F	Hannah Brandt	1.68 m (5 ft 6 in)	68 kg (150 lb)	27 November 1993 (aged 28)	Vadnais Heights, Minnesota	(United States) PWHPA Minnesota
21	F	Hilary Knight	1.80 m (5 ft 11 in)	78 kg (172 lb)	12 July 1989 (aged 32)	Sun Valley, Idaho	(United States) PWHPA Minnesota
24	F	Dani Cameranesi	1.65 m (5 ft 5 in)	70 kg (150 lb)	30 June 1995 (aged 26)	Plymouth, Minnesota	(United States) PWHPA Minnesota
25	F	Alex Carpenter	1.70 m (5 ft 7 in)	70 kg (150 lb)	13 April 1994 (aged 27)	North Reading, Massachusetts	(China) KRS Vanke Rays
26	F	Kendall Coyne Schofield – C	1.57 m (5 ft 2 in)	57 kg (126 lb)	25 May 1992 (aged 29)	Palos Heights, Illinois	(United States) PWHPA Minnesota
28	F	Amanda Kessel	1.68 m (5 ft 6 in)	59 kg (130 lb)	28 August 1991 (aged 30)	Madison, Wisconsin	(United States) PWHPA New Hampshire
29	G	Nicole Hensley	1.68 m (5 ft 6 in)	70 kg (150 lb)	23 June 1994 (aged 27)	Lakewood, Colorado	(United States) PWHPA New Hampshire
33	G	Alex Cavallini	1.70 m (5 ft 7 in)	70 kg (150 lb)	3 January 1992 (aged 30)	Delafield, Wisconsin	(United States) PWHPA Minnesota
35	G	Maddie Rooney	1.65 m (5 ft 5 in)	66 kg (146 lb)	7 July 1997 (aged 24)	Andover, Minnesota	(United States) PWHPA Minnesota
37	F	Abbey Murphy	1.65 m (5 ft 5 in)	66 kg (146 lb)	14 April 2002 (aged 19)	Evergreen Park, Illinois	(United States) Minnesota Golden Gophers

* Missed the remainder of the tournament after a knee injury in the first preliminary round game on February 3.

Group play

Pos	Team	Pld	W	OTW	OTL	L	GF	GA	GD	Pts	Qualification
1	Canada	4	4	0	0	0	33	5	+28	12	Quarterfinals
2	United States	4	3	0	0	1	20	6	+14	9	Quarterfinals
3	Finland	4	1	0	0	3	10	19	−9	3 (Note: Finland 3 Pts, +4 GD; ROC 3 Pts, −2 GD; Switzerland 3 Pts, −2 GD. ROC defeated Switzerland 5–2.)	Quarterfinals
4	ROC	4	1	0	0	3	6	18	−12	3	Quarterfinals
5	Switzerland	4	1	0	0	3	6	27	−21	3	Quarterfinals

Source: IIHF
Rules for classification: Tiebreakers
Notes:

3 February 2022; 21:10 v	Finland	2–5 (0–2, 0–2, 2–1)	United States	Wukesong Arena, Beijing; Attendance: 335

Game reference

Anni Keisala
Goalies
Maddie Rooney
Referees:
(United States) Kelly Cooke
(Canada) Lacey Senuk
Linesmen:
(Canada) Alex Clarke
(United States) Sara Strong

	0–1	10:37 – Kessel (Harmon)
	0–2	13:00 – Carpenter (Pannek, Dunne) (PP)
	0–3	25:32 – Coyne Schofield (Barnes, Compher)
	0–4	26:36 – Coyne Schofield (Harmon, Knight)
Tapani (Laitinen, Nieminen) (PP) – 43:15	1–4
	1–5	48:01 – Carpenter (Roque, Kessel)
Tapani (Karvinen) (PP) – 57:40	2–5

8 min
Penalties
6 min
12
Shots
52

5 February 2022; 21:10 v	United States	5–0 (1–0, 1–0, 3–0)	ROC	Wukesong Arena, Beijing; Attendance: 581

Game reference

Nicole Hensley
Goalies
Maria Sorokina
Daria Gredzen
Referees:
(Germany) Tijana Haack
(Finland) Anniina Nurmi
Linesmen:
(Sweden) Anna Hammar
(Finland) Jenni Heikkinen

Harmon (Knight, Brandt) – 12:29	1–0
Knight (Harmon, Coyne Schofield) – 28:51	2–0
Zumwinkle (Cameranesi, Bozek) – 43:57	3–0
Compher (Murphy, Scamurra) – 46:15	4–0
Carpenter (Kessel, Harmon) – 48:44	5–0

6 min
Penalties
14 min
62
Shots
12

6 February 2022; 21:10 v	Switzerland	0–8 (0–5, 0–2, 0–1)	United States	Wukesong Arena, Beijing; Attendance: 545

Game reference

Andrea Brändli
Saskia Maurer
Goalies
Alex Cavallini
Referees:
(Sweden) Maria Furberg
(Canada) Lacey Senuk
Linesmen:
(Canada) Alex Clarke
(United States) Sara Strong

0–1	05:40 – Knight (Brandt, Keller) (PP)
0–2	14:04 – Compher (Scamurra, Bozek)
0–3	14:13 – Knight
0–4	16:15 – Pannek
0–5	19:38 – Kessel (Dunne, Barnes)
0–6	22:11 – Pannek (Kessel, Carpenter)
0–7	37:12 – Compher (Bozek, Dunne)
0–8	57:29 – Cameranesi (Pannek, Barnes)

8 min
Penalties
4 min
12
Shots
66

8 February 2022; 12:10 v	United States	2–4 (0–1, 2–3, 0–0)	Canada	Wukesong Arena, Beijing; Attendance: 591

Game reference

Maddie Rooney
Goalies
Ann-Renée Desbiens
Referees:
(Canada) Cianna Lieffers
(Canada) Lacey Senuk
(Canada) Elizabeth Mantha
Linesmen:
(United States) Kendall Hanley
(United States) Jacqueline Spresser

	0–1	14:10 – Jenner (Fillier, Poulin) (PP)
Cameranesi (Pannek, Barnes) – 29:17	1–1
Carpenter (Kessel, Keller) (PP) – 31:34	2–1
	2–2	32:00 – Jenner (Nurse)
	2–3	34:25 – Rattray (Spooner, Zandee-Hart)
	2–4	37:25 – Poulin (PS)

2 min
Penalties
12 min
53
Shots
27

Quarterfinals

11 February 2022; 12:10 v	United States	4–1 (0–0, 1–1, 3–0)	Czech Republic	Wukesong Arena, Beijing; Attendance: 636

Game reference

Alex Cavallini
Goalies
Klára Peslarová
Referees:
(Canada) Elizabeth Mantha
(Finland) Anniina Nurmi
Linesmen:
(Sweden) Anna Hammar
(United States) Kendall Hanley

	0–1	24:59 – Pejzlová (Vanišová, Křížová)
Knight (Coyne Schofield) – 25:47	1–1
Stecklein (Pannek, Keller) – 46:49	2–1
Harmon (Brandt, Knight) (PP) – 56:51	3–1
Coyne Schofield (Keller) (ENG) – 59:54	4–1

11 min
Penalties
10 min
59
Shots
6

Semifinals

14 February 2022; 21:10 v	United States	4–1 (0–0, 2–0, 2–1)	Finland	Wukesong Arena, Beijing; Attendance: 642

Game reference

Alex Cavallini
Goalies
Anni Keisala
Referees:
(United States) Kelly Cooke
(Canada) Cianna Lieffers
Linesmen:
(Sweden) Anna Hammar
(Austria) Julia Kainberger

Barnes (Brandt, Knight) (PP) – 23:39	1–0
Knight (Harmon, Coyne Schofield) – 38:53	2–0
Scamurra (Barnes) – 55:20	3–0
	3–1	59:34 – Tapani (Karvinen, Hiirikoski) (EA)
Roque (Carpenter, Kessel) (ENG) – 59:55	4–1

6 min
Penalties
6 min
42
Shots
26

Gold medal game

17 February 2022; 12:10	Canada	3–2 (2–0, 1–1, 0–1)	United States	Wukesong Arena, Beijing; Attendance: 834

Game reference

Ann-Renee Desbiens
Goalies
Alex Cavallini
Referees:
(United States) Kelly Cooke
(Switzerland) Anna Wiegand
Linesmen:
(Sweden) Anna Hammar
(United States) Kendall Hanley

Nurse (Thompson, Poulin) – 07:50	1–0
Poulin – 15:02	2–0
Poulin (Jenner, Nurse) – 29:08	3–0
	3–1	36:39 – Knight (Brandt) (SH)
	3–2	59:47 – Kessel (Roque, Carpenter) (PP, EA)

6 min
Penalties
4 min
21
Shots
40

== Luge ==
The United States qualified three men's and three women's entries as well as a men's doubles entry over the course of the 2021–22 Luge World Cup. Qualifying at least one sled in each discipline also qualified the United States for the team relay.

Men

Athlete	Event	Run 1		Run 2		Run 3		Run 4		Total	
Athlete	Event	Time	Rank	Time	Rank	Time	Rank	Time	Rank	Time	Rank
Jonathan Gustafson	Singles	57.845	13	59.330	27	58.496	20	58.275	18	3:53.946	19
Chris Mazdzer	Singles	57.780	10	58.039	9	57.779	10	57.779	10	3:51.377	8
Tucker West	Singles	58.079	15	57.831	8	58.534	21	57.916	13	3:52.360	13

Women

Athlete	Event	Run 1		Run 2		Run 3		Run 4		Total	
Athlete	Event	Time	Rank	Time	Rank	Time	Rank	Time	Rank	Time	Rank
Summer Britcher	Singles	1:00.986	29	59.156	15	59.152	20	Did not advance		2:59.294	23
Ashley Farquharson	Singles	59.972	26	59.024	8	58.768	8	58.643	7	3:56.407	12
Emily Sweeney	Singles	58.971	10	1:02.439	32	58.882	12	Did not advance		3:00.292	26

Mixed/Open

Athlete	Event	Run 1		Run 2		Run 3		Total	
Athlete	Event	Time	Rank	Time	Rank	Time	Rank	Time	Rank
Zack DiGregorio; Sean Hollander	Doubles	59.389	12	59.126	10	—N/a		1:58.515	11
Ashley Farquharson; Chris Mazdzer; Zack DiGregorio; Sean Hollander	Team relay	1:00.332	4	1:00.119	6	1:01.182	9	3:05.741	7

== Nordic combined ==
The United States qualified a team of five Nordic combined athletes.

Athlete	Event	Ski jumping			Cross-country		Total	
Athlete	Event	Distance	Points	Rank	Time	Rank	Time	Rank
Taylor Fletcher	Normal hill/10 km	86.5	83.3	34	24:31.9	6	27:50.9	24
Ben Loomis	Normal hill/10 km	94.5	105.6	17	25:07.8	16	26:57.8	15
Stephen Schumann	Normal hill/10 km	88.5	86.4	33	24:46.4	8	27:52.4	25
Jared Shumate	Normal hill/10 km	93.5	99.2	24	24:55.0	13	27:10.0	19
Taylor Fletcher	Large hill/10 km	117.0	81.2	35	25:42.7	5	29:36.7	23
Jasper Good	Large hill/10 km	115.5	79.8	36	27:32.9	32	31:32.9	34
Ben Loomis	Large hill/10 km	129.0	103.4	17	26:51.2	19	29:17.2	19
Jared Shumate	Large hill/10 km	127.5	101.3	19	26:24.5	13	28:58.5	17
Taylor Fletcher; Jasper Good; Ben Loomis; Jared Shumate	Team large hill/4 × 5 km	484.5	387.1	7	51:09.1	2	53:07.1	6

== Short track speed skating ==
The United States qualified a team of two men and five women based on performance in the 2021–22 ISU Short Track Speed Skating World Cup. Additionally, the United States qualified in the women's and mixed relays.

Men

Athlete	Event	Heat		Quarterfinal		Semifinal		Final	
Athlete	Event	Time	Rank	Time	Rank	Time	Rank	Time	Rank
Ryan Pivirotto	500 m	41.018	3 q	41.841	4	Did not advance			16
Andrew Heo	1000 m	1:24.106	2 Q	1:24.603	1 Q	1:24.023	3 FB	1:36.140	7
Ryan Pivirotto	1000 m	1:54.437	2 Q	2:08.364	4	Did not advance			13
Andrew Heo	1500 m	—N/a		2:19.482	5	Did not advance			28
Ryan Pivirotto	1500 m	—N/a		DSQ		Did not advance			NR

Qualification legend: Q - Qualify based on position in heat; q - Qualify based on time in field; FA - Qualify to medal final; FB - Qualify to consolation final

Women

Athlete	Event	Heat		Quarterfinal		Semifinal		Final	
Athlete	Event	Time	Rank	Time	Rank	Time	Rank	Time	Rank
Maame Biney	500 m	42.919	3 q	46.099	3	Did not advance			13
Kristen Santos	500 m	43.579	1 Q	DSQ		Did not advance			17
Corinne Stoddard	500 m	DNF		Did not advance					32
Maame Biney	1000 m	1:27.859	1 Q	1:29.225	2 Q	1:28.806	4 FB	1:30.736	8
Kristen Santos	1000 m	1:28.237	1 Q	1:28.393	1 Q	1:26.783	1 FA	1:42.745	4
Corinne Stoddard	1000 m	1:27.528	3 q	1:27.912	3 q	1:27.626	4 FB	1:29.845	7
Julie Letai	1500 m	—N/a		2:36.214	5 ADV	2:23.315	8	Did not advance	21
Kristen Santos	1500 m	—N/a		2:21.027	1 Q	2:31.067	5 ADV B	2:45.492	9
Corinne Stoddard	1500 m	—N/a		2:33.329	3 Q	2:22.632	6	Did not advance	18
Maame Biney; Julie Letai; Kristen Santos; Corinne Stoddard	3000 m relay	—N/a				4:06.098	4 FB	DSQ	8

Qualification legend: Q - Qualify based on position in heat; q - Qualify based on time in field; ADV - Advanced to next round on referee decision; FA - Qualify to medal final; FB - Qualify to consolation final; ADV A - Advanced to medal final on referee decision; ADV B - Advanced to consolation final on referee decision

Mixed

Athlete	Event	Quarterfinal		Semifinal		Final	
Athlete	Event	Time	Rank	Time	Rank	Time	Rank
Maame Biney; Andrew Heo; Ryan Pivirotto; Kristen Santos	2000 m relay	2:39.043	3 q	DSQ		Did not advance	8

Qualification legend: Q - Qualify based on position in heat; q - Qualify based on time in field; FA - Qualify to medal final; FB - Qualify to consolation final

== Skeleton ==
The United States qualified one male and two female skeleton racers over the course of the 2021–22 Skeleton World Cup.

Athlete	Event	Run 1		Run 2		Run 3		Run 4		Total	
Athlete	Event	Time	Rank	Time	Rank	Time	Rank	Time	Rank	Time	Rank
Andrew Blaser	Men's	1:01.80	20	1:02.08	21	1:02.10	22	Did not advance		3:05.98	21
Kelly Curtis	Women's	1:02.94	19	1:03.05	16	1:03.24	23	Did not advance		3:09.23	21
Katie Uhlaender	Women's	1:02.41	9	1:02.46	8	1:02.15	6	1:02.21	5	4:09.23	6

== Ski jumping ==
The United States qualified a team of four men and one woman in ski jumping.

Men

Athlete	Event	Qualification			First round			Final			Total	
Athlete	Event	Distance	Points	Rank	Distance	Points	Rank	Distance	Points	Rank	Points	Rank
Kevin Bickner	Normal hill	78.0	61.8	43 Q	95.0	108.1	43	Did not advance				
Decker Dean	Normal hill	81.0	66.6	42 Q	90.0	106.6	44	Did not advance				
Patrick Gasienica	Normal hill	81.5	61.2	44 Q	87.0	89.8	49	Did not advance				
Casey Larson	Normal hill	79.0	69.8	41 Q	96.5	113.2	39	Did not advance				
Kevin Bickner	Large hill	110.5	84.3	45 Q	125.0	110.0	39	Did not advance				
Decker Dean	Large hill	112.0	94.9	38 Q	120.0	100.9	45	Did not advance				
Patrick Gasienica	Large hill	101.5	63.6	53	Did not advance							
Casey Larson	Large hill	116.5	89.2	43 Q	123.0	107.5	43	Did not advance				
Kevin Bickner; Decker Dean; Patrick Gasienica; Casey Larson	Team large hill	—N/a			407.0	261.0	10	Did not advance				

Women

Athlete	Event	First round			Final			Total	
Athlete	Event	Distance	Points	Rank	Distance	Points	Rank	Points	Rank
Anna Hoffman	Normal hill	64.5	36.2	37	Did not advance			36.2	37

== Snowboarding ==
The United States confirmed quota spots for 13 men and 12 women snowboarders.

Freestyle
Men

Athlete	Event	Qualification					Final				
Athlete	Event	Run 1	Run 2	Run 3	Best	Rank	Run 1	Run 2	Run 3	Best	Rank
Chris Corning	Big air	64.25	17.50	81.75	146.00	10 Q	92.00	35.50	64.00	156.00	7
Sean FitzSimons	Big air	53.25	68.75	16.25	122.00	17	Did not advance				
Red Gerard	Big air	75.50	80.00	78.75	158.75	3 Q	82.50	19.25	83.25	165.75	5
Dusty Henricksen	Big air	23.00	72.75	20.75	93.50	21	Did not advance				
Lucas Foster	Halfpipe	42.00	21.50	—N/a	42.00	17	Did not advance				
Taylor Gold	Halfpipe	81.25	83.50	—N/a	83.50	7 Q	81.75	25.00	20.00	81.75	5
Chase Josey	Halfpipe	15.75	69.50	—N/a	69.50	12 Q	62.50	23.00	79.50	79.50	7
Shaun White	Halfpipe	24.25	86.25	—N/a	86.25	4 Q	72.00	85.00	14.75	85.00	4
Chris Corning	Slopestyle	48.48	69.30	—N/a	69.30	11 Q	31.58	20.78	65.11	65.11	6
Sean FitzSimons	Slopestyle	78.76	26.75	—N/a	78.76	3 Q	29.48	29.61	26.61	29.61	12
Red Gerard	Slopestyle	78.20	43.95	—N/a	78.20	5 Q	83.25	71.86	28.65	83.25	4
Dusty Henricksen	Slopestyle	37.46	58.46	—N/a	58.46	17	Did not advance				

Women

Athlete	Event	Qualification					Final				
Athlete	Event	Run 1	Run 2	Run 3	Best	Rank	Run 1	Run 2	Run 3	Best	Rank
Jamie Anderson	Big air	30.00	29.50	89.75	119.75	15	Did not advance				
Hailey Langland	Big air	62.00	65.50	21.25	127.50	12 Q	25.25	31.00	22.25	53.25	12
Julia Marino	Big air	DNS					Did not advance				
Courtney Rummel	Big air	44.75	56.25	38.75	101.00	19	Did not advance				
Zoe Kalapos	Halfpipe	20.00	51.75	—N/a	51.75	17	Did not advance				
Chloe Kim	Halfpipe	87.75	8.75	—N/a	87.75	1 Q	94.00	27.00	26.25	94.00	1st place, gold medalist(s)
Maddie Mastro	Halfpipe	65.75	51.50	—N/a	66.75	13	Did not advance				
Tessa Maud	Halfpipe	53.50	10.00	—N/a	53.50	16	Did not advance				
Jamie Anderson	Slopestyle	74.35	53.26	—N/a	74.35	5 Q	22.98	60.78	36.88	60.78	9
Hailey Langland	Slopestyle	28.31	68.71	—N/a	68.71	9 Q	32.05	48.35	29.93	48.35	11
Julia Marino	Slopestyle	2.91	71.78	—N/a	71.78	6 Q	30.61	87.68	60.35	87.68	2nd place, silver medalist(s)
Courtney Rummel	Slopestyle	37.18	48.30	—N/a	48.30	18	Did not advance				

Parallel

Athlete	Event	Qualification		Round of 16	Quarterfinal	Semifinal	Final	
Athlete	Event	Time	Rank	Opposition Time	Opposition Time	Opposition Time	Opposition Time	Rank
Robby Burns	Men's giant slalom	1:36.22	31	Did not advance				
Cody Winters	Men's giant slalom	1:27.80	29	Did not advance				

Snowboard cross
Men

Athlete	Event	Seeding		1/8 final	Quarterfinal	Semifinal	Final	
Athlete	Event	Time	Rank	Position	Position	Position	Position	Rank
Nick Baumgartner	Snowboard cross	1:18.01	10	2 Q	3	Did not advance		10
Mick Dierdorff	Snowboard cross	1:18.64	20	1 Q	DNF	Did not advance		15
Hagen Kearney	Snowboard cross	1:17.81	7	3	Did not advance			17
Jake Vedder	Snowboard cross	1:17.88	18	1 Q	2 Q	3 FB	2	6

Women

Athlete	Event	Seeding		1/8 final	Quarterfinal	Semifinal	Final	
Athlete	Event	Time	Rank	Position	Position	Position	Position	Rank
Stacy Gaskill	Snowboard cross	1:23.14	4	1 Q	2 Q	4 FB	3	7
Faye Gulini	Snowboard cross	1:23.98	7	1 Q	4	Did not advance		13
Lindsey Jacobellis	Snowboard cross	1:23.44	5	1 Q	1 Q	1 FA	1	1st place, gold medalist(s)
Meghan Tierney	Snowboard cross	1:25.16	16	2 Q	3	Did not advance		12

Mixed

Athlete	Event	Quarterfinal	Semifinal	Final	
Athlete	Event	Position	Position	Position	Rank
Nick Baumgartner; Lindsey Jacobellis	Team snowboard cross	1 Q	2 FA	1	1st place, gold medalist(s)
Faye Gulini; Jake Vedder	Team snowboard cross	3	Did not advance		=9

Qualification legend: Q - Qualify to next round; FA - Qualify to medal final; FB - Qualify to consolation final

== Speed skating ==
The United States qualified seven men, including a team in the Team pursuit event, and five women over the course of the 2021–22 ISU Speed Skating World Cup.

Casey Dawson was replaced by Emery Lehman in the 5000 meters due to a positive test for COVID-19.

Erin Jackson became the first Black female athlete to win a medal in speed skating after her gold medal performance in the 500 meters.

Distance
Men

Athlete	Event	Time	Rank
Austin Kleba	500 m	35.40	27
Jordan Stolz	500 m	34.85	13
Austin Kleba	1000 m	1:10.67	29
Jordan Stolz	1000 m	1:09.12	14
Casey Dawson	1500 m	1:49.45	28
Emery Lehman	1500 m	1:45.78	11
Joey Mantia	1500 m	1:45.26	6
Ethan Cepuran	5000 m	6:25.97	17
Emery Lehman	5000 m	6:21.80	16

Women

Athlete	Event	Time	Rank
Brittany Bowe	500 m	38.04	16
Kimi Goetz	500 m	38.26	18
Erin Jackson	500 m	37.04	1st place, gold medalist(s)
Brittany Bowe	1000 m	1:14.61	3rd place, bronze medalist(s)
Kimi Goetz	1000 m	1:15.40	7
Brittany Bowe	1500 m	1:55.81	10
Mia Manganello-Kilburg	1500 m	1:59.11	20
Mia Manganello-Kilburg	3000 m	4:13.42	19

Mass start

Athlete	Event	Semifinal			Final		
Athlete	Event	Points	Time	Rank	Points	Time	Rank
Joey Mantia	Men's mass start	6	7:44.37	7 Q	10	7:47.20	4
Ian Quinn	Men's mass start	0	7:58.03	13	Did not advance		26
Giorgia Birkeland	Women's mass start	3	8:34.43	6 Q	0	8:18.10	13
Mia Manganello-Kilburg	Women's mass start	10	8:29.93	4 Q	10	8:16.15	4

Team pursuit

Athlete	Event	Quarterfinal		Semifinal	Final	
Athlete	Event	Opposition Time	Rank	Opposition Time	Opposition Time	Rank
Ethan Cepuran; Casey Dawson; Emery Lehman; Joey Mantia	Men's	3:37.51	2 Q	ROC; L +0.43 FB	Netherlands; W 3:38.81	3rd place, bronze medalist(s)

Qualification legend: Q - Qualify to the next round; FA - Qualify to the gold medal final; FB - Qualify to the bronze medal final; FC - Qualify to the 5th place final; FD - Qualify to the 7th place final

== Calls for Olympic boycott ==
On 22 February 2021, U.S. Representative John Katko from New York called for a United States boycott of the 2022 Olympic Games, citing human rights concerns and the Chinese Communist Party's actions against the country's own Uyghur population, including displacement and imprisonment of civilians in the Xinjiang re-education camps. Representative Katko published an open letter recommending a boycott to the House Committee on Homeland Security, as well as President Biden, National Security Advisor Jake Sullivan, U.S. Secretary of State Antony Blinken, Secretary of Homeland Security Alejandro Mayorkas, and the International Olympic Committee. In the open letter, Katko cited an earlier 19 January 2021 statement from then-serving U.S. Secretary of State Mike Pompeo, in which Pompeo stated that, "since at least March 2017, the People's Republic of China (PRC), under the direction and control of the Chinese Communist Party (CCP), has committed crimes against humanity against the predominantly Muslim Uyghurs and other members of ethnic and religious minority groups in Xinjiang."

Former United States Ambassador to the United Nations, Republican Nikki Haley, announced her support of a possible boycott, authoring a 25 February 2021 op-ed for Fox News titled "Amb. Nikki Haley: Biden should boycott China's Winter Olympics next year", comparing the government and ideology of Nazi Germany to that of "Communist China", urging President Biden to boycott the Olympics in collaboration with American-allied nations. Haley further compared the future 2022 Beijing Games to the 1936 Berlin Olympics, the last Olympics to be held before the outbreak of World War II.

In an unrelated interview on 5 March 2021, former Secretary Pompeo stated that the United States should withdraw from the 2022 Olympic Games. In an interview with conservative talk radio host Hugh Hewitt, Pompeo cited "nasty activity" by the Chinese government as evidence to support a boycott.

In a Politico article published on 10 March 2021, Texas Senator Ted Cruz spoke against a possible boycott, stating, "I don't think we should be punishing athletes who have spent their entire lives training. We should go to Beijing, compete, and win." Florida Senator Marco Rubio previously signed a resolution authored by Senator Rick Scott which "demanded the International Olympic Committee move the 2022 Winter Olympics out of Communist China", but also refused to support a boycott, stating that he did not make a formal decision yet. Democratic Senator Ben Cardin, a ranking member of the Senate Foreign Relations Committee, stated that "It's important that we use every opportunity to advance global support against what China is doing", recognizing that "[boycotting the 2022 Olympics] may be not a realistic path forward, but it's certainly something we should be talking about."

On 15 March 2021, the New York Times published an op-ed by U.S. Senator and former 2012 Republican presidential candidate, Mitt Romney, titled "The Right Way to Boycott the Beijing Olympics." In the piece, Romney stated that the United States should pursue a partial "economic and diplomatic boycott" of the Olympics, with athletes participating in the games but "limiting spectators, selectively shaping our respective delegations and refraining from broadcasting Chinese propaganda." Romney ended the piece criticizing the International Olympic Committee for their selection of host countries, commenting that "In authoritarian states, the Olympics has more often been a tool of propaganda than a lever of reform."

On 19 October 2021, American figure skater Evan Bates described the situation in Xinjiang as "terrible" and "awful", and Vincent Zhou and Nathan Chen, skaters of Chinese descent, echoed Bates' statement over the human rights situation in Xinjiang.

On 6 December 2021, President Biden announced that the United States would diplomatically boycott the Olympic Games. Unlike a complete boycott, it did not have any impact for any athletes from the United States attending the Winter Games.

A boycott of the 2022 Olympic Games would have been the second American-led boycott of the modern Olympic Games. The United States and 65 other nations boycotted the 1980 Summer Olympics, which were primarily held in Moscow, Russian SFSR, Soviet Union, in present-day Russia. The bloc cited the Soviet Invasion of Afghanistan as their rationale for the boycott, with the United States hosting a substitute track and field event called the Liberty Bell Classic, with China in attendance. Four years later, the Soviet Union and 14 of its allies then boycotted the 1984 Summer Olympics, which were held in Los Angeles, United States. The Soviet-allied countries then substituted the 1984 Olympics by organizing the Friendship Games (which was attended by China). The Friendship Games were held in a variety of venues, including the Soviet Union, Bulgaria, Czechoslovakia (now the Czech Republic and Slovakia), Cuba, Hungary, Mongolia, Poland, and East Germany (now part of Germany). Despite participating in the Friendship Games, China also participated at the 1984 Summer Olympics in Los Angeles, participating for the first time since 1952 and having boycotted the 1980 Summer Games in Moscow due to the Sino-Soviet split.

== Athlete safety ==
Competitors were warned by Human Rights Watch that speaking out was not tolerated in China and as a result if they spoke out about human rights or other issues in China they faced significant legal penalties. For their protection the American team was shielded from questions related to human rights.

Members of Congress expressed their concerns about athlete safety. Retired Olympic cross-country skier Noah Hoffman also expressed concerns about athlete safety, citing China's human rights record and a lack of concern shown by the IOC.

== See also ==
- United States at the 2022 Winter Paralympics
