= Lovro Kos =

Slovenian ski jumper (born 1999)

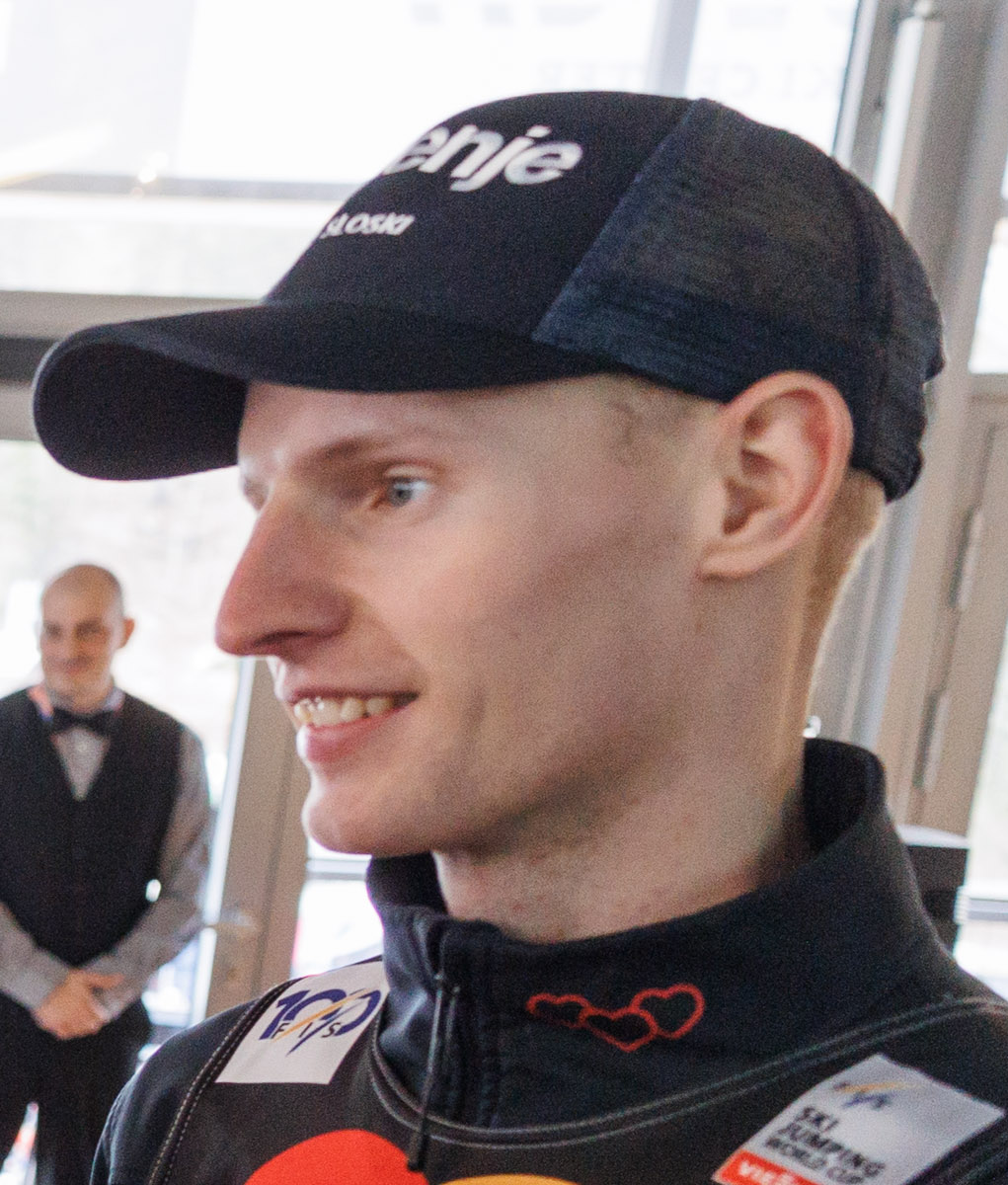
- Kos in 2024

Personal information
- Born: 23 July 1999 (age 26) Ljubljana, Slovenia

Sport
- Sport: Ski jumping
- Club: SSK Ilirija

World Cup career
- Seasons: 2021–present
- Indiv. starts: 117
- Indiv. podiums: 4
- Indiv. wins: 2
- Team starts: 14
- Team podiums: 10
- Team wins: 4

Achievements and titles
- Personal bests: 236 m (774 ft); Planica, 24 March 2021
Medal record
Representing Slovenia
Men's ski jumping
Olympic Games
Silver medal – second place	2022 Beijing	Team LH
World Championships
Gold medal – first place	2023 Planica	Team LH
Gold medal – first place	2025 Trondheim	Team LH
Men's ski flying
World Championships
Gold medal – first place	2024 Bad Mitterndorf	Team
- Updated on 21 December 2025

Lovro Kos (born 23 July 1999) is a Slovenian ski jumper.

== Career ==
Kos made his FIS Ski Jumping World Cup debut in January 2021 in Willingen. Three years later, on 10 February 2024, he won his first individual World Cup event in Lake Placid.

He competed at the 2022 Winter Olympics in Beijing and won a silver medal in the men's large hill team event, together with his teammates Peter Prevc, Timi Zajc, and Cene Prevc.

== Major tournament results ==
=== Winter Olympics ===
Year	Place	Individual		Team	
Year	Place	Normal	Large	Men	Mixed
2022	(China) Beijing	28	11	2nd place, silver medalist(s)	—

=== FIS Nordic World Ski Championships ===
Year	Place	Individual		Team	
Year	Place	Normal	Large	Men	Mixed
2023	(Slovenia) Planica	17	—	1st place, gold medalist(s)	—
2025	(Norway) Trondheim	13	10	1st place, gold medalist(s)	—

=== FIS Ski Flying World Championships ===
Year	Place	Individual	Team
2024	(Austria) Bad Mitterndorf	5	1st place, gold medalist(s)

== World Cup results ==
=== Standings ===
Season	Overall	4H	SF	RA
2020–21	62	—	27	N/A
2021–22	18	7	26	26
2022–23	22	12	24	30
2023–24	9	7	16	14
2024–25	30	35	22	29
2025–26	—	—	—	N/A

=== Individual wins ===
No.	Season	Date	Location	Hill	Size
1	2023–24	10 February 2024	(United States) Lake Placid	MacKenzie Intervale Complex HS128	LH
2	2023–24	1 March 2024	(Finland) Lahti	Salpausselkä HS130	LH

=== Individual starts ===
winner (1); second (2); third (3); did not compete (–); failed to qualify (q); disqualified (DQ)
Season	1	2	3	4	5	6	7	8	9	10	11	12	13	14	15	16	17	18	19	20	21	22	23	24	25	26	27	28	29	30	31	32	Points
2020–21	Wisła	Ruka	Ruka	Nizhny Tagil	Nizhny Tagil	Engelberg	Engelberg	Oberstdorf	Garmisch-Partenkirchen	Innsbruck	Bischofshofen	Titisee-Neustadt	Titisee-Neustadt	Zakopane	Lahti	Willingen	Willingen	Klingenthal	Klingenthal	Zakopane	Zakopane	Râșnov	Planica	Planica	Planica								14
2020–21	–	–	–	–	–	–	–	–	–	–	–	–	–	–	–	q	39	–	–	–	–	–	27	21	–								14
2021–22	Nizhny Tagil	Nizhny Tagil	Ruka	Ruka	Wisła	Klingenthal	Klingenthal	Engelberg	Engelberg	Oberstdorf	Garmisch-Partenkirchen	Bischofshofen	Bischofshofen	Bischofshofen	Zakopane	Titisee-Neustadt	Titisee-Neustadt	Willingen	Willingen	Lahti	Lahti	Lillehammer	Oslo	Oslo	Oberstdorf	Oberstdorf	Planica	Planica					403
2021–22	34	34	15	39	8	39	17	16	30	6	3	25	9	41	16	7	12	7	10	42	q	22	15	37	28	19	27	20					403
2022–23	Wisła	Wisła	Ruka	Ruka	Klingenthal	Klingenthal	Engelberg	Engelberg	Oberstdorf	Garmisch-Partenkirchen	Bischofshofen	Bischofshofen	Zakopane	Sapporo	Sapporo	Sapporo	Bischofshofen	Bischofshofen	Garmisch-Partenkirchen	Garmisch-Partenkirchen	Lake Placid	Lake Placid	Râșnov	Lillehammer	Oslo	Oslo	Lillehammer	Oslo	Oslo	Lahti	Planica	Planica	309
2022–23	33	28	15	24	36	16	19	11	7	13	12	22	13	29	44	16	16	24	19	19	q	27	–	35	q	46	30	30	19	8	30	20	309
2023–24	Ruka	Ruka	Lillehammer	Lillehammer	Klingenthal	Klingenthal	Engelberg	Engelberg	Oberstdorf	Garmisch-Partenkirchen	Innsbruck	Bischofshofen	Wisła	Zakopane	Willingen	Willingen	Lake Placid	Lake Placid	Sapporo	Sapporo	Oberstdorf	Oberstdorf	Lahti	Lahti	Oslo	Oslo	Trondheim	Trondheim	Vikersund	Vikersund	Planica	Planica	792
2023–24	–	–	–	–	30	4	DQ	7	4	15	4	26	4	9	10	16	1	2	23	9	15	24	1	24	18	13	27	27	18	16	12	10	792
