= Patrick Gasienica =

American freestyle skier (1998–2023)

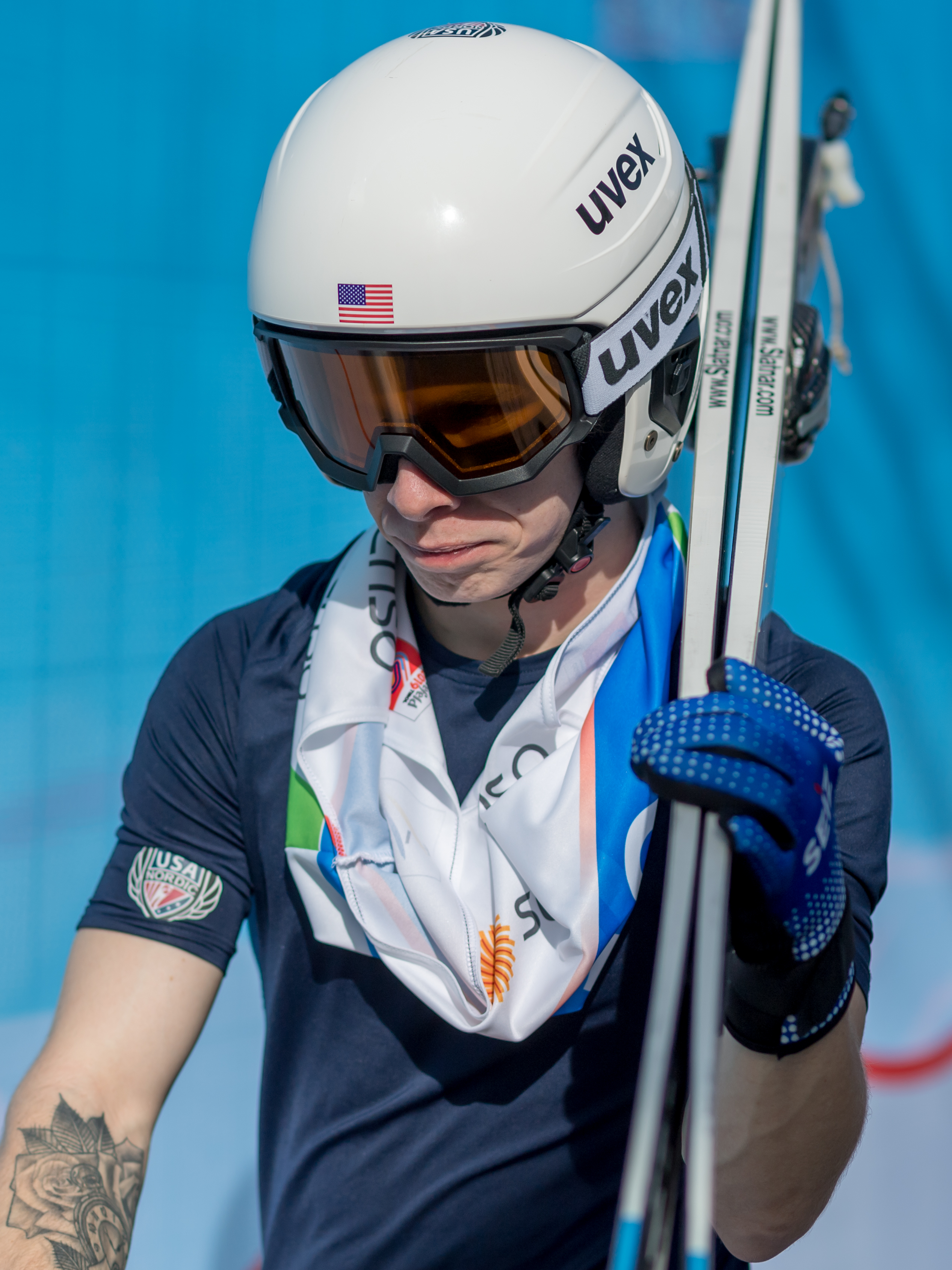
- Gasienica in 2019

Personal information
- Nationality: American
- Born: November 28, 1998; McHenry, Illinois, U.S.
- Died: June 12, 2023 (aged 24); Bull Valley, Illinois, U.S.

Sport
- Sport: Ski jumping
- Club: Norge Ski Club

Patrick Gasienica (November 28, 1998 – June 12, 2023) was an American ski jumper. He competed in the 2022 Winter Olympics in Beijing.

== Personal life and death ==
Gasienica was born in the United States to a family of Polish immigrants from Zakopane. He died in a motorcycle accident in Bull Valley, Illinois, on June 12, 2023, at the age of 24.
