= Matthew Soukup =

Canadian ski jumper

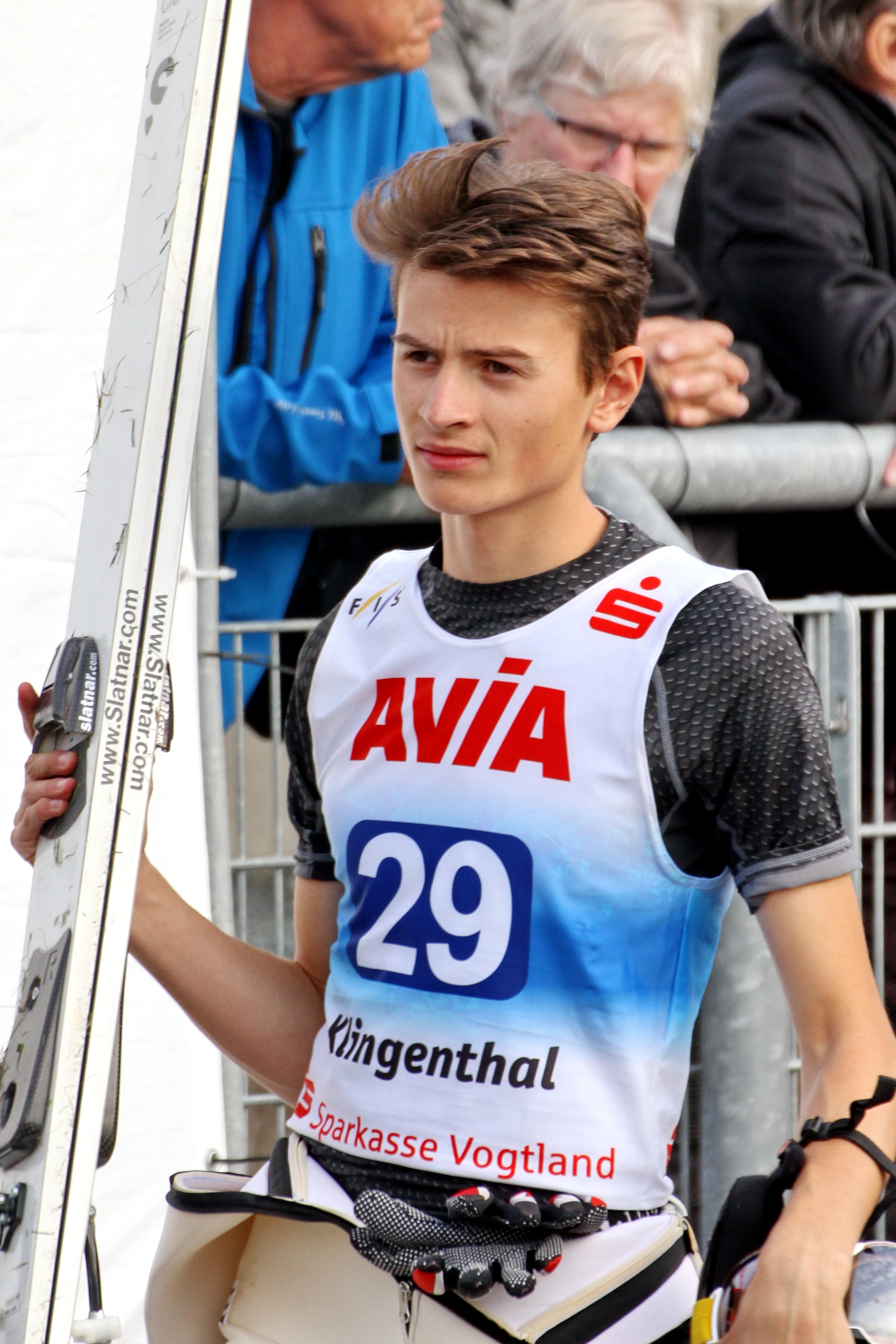
- Soukup in 2017

Personal information
- Born: 31 August 1997 (age 29) Calgary, Alberta, Canada

Sport
- Country: Canada
- Sport: Ski jumping
Medal record
Winter Olympics
Bronze medal – third place	2022 Beijing	Mixed team

Matthew Soukup (born 31 August 1997) is a Canadian former ski jumper. Soukup started skiing at the age of three, and later on picked up the sport of ski jumping.

== Career ==
Soukup has competed at two World Championships. Soukup trains in Slovenia, as the jumps at the Canada Olympic Park in Calgary were shut down.

=== 2022 Winter Olympic Games ===
In January 2022, Soukup was named to Canada's 2022 Olympic team.

On February 7, Soukup won the bronze medal as part of Canada's entry into the mixed team competition. This was Canada's first ever Olympic medal in the sport of ski jumping.
