= Decker Dean =

American ski jumper (born 2000)

Personal information
- Nationality: United States
- Born: August 8, 2000 (age 26) Steamboat Springs, Colorado, U.S.

Sport
- Sport: Skiing
- Club: Steamboat Springs WSC

World Cup career
- Seasons: 2020–present
- Indiv. starts: 12
- Team starts: 1

Achievements and titles
- Personal bests: 211 m (692 ft); Planica, March 24, 2021
- Updated on March 6, 2022

Decker Dean (born August 8, 2000) is an American ski jumper.

== Career ==
He made his world cup debut in the 2019/20 season. His best result is 2nd place from the Continental Cup event in Willingen 2020. He set his personal best at 188.5 metres (618 ft) in Planica world championships.

In January 2022, USA Nordic nominated him to be a member of the US Olympic Team in ski jumping for the February 2022 Olympic Games in Beijing. It was his first Olympics.

== World Cup ==
=== Standings ===
Season	Overall	4H	SF	RA	W6	T5	P7
2019/20	—	—	—	—	—	—	N/A
2020/21	—	59	—	N/A	—	N/A	53
2020/21	62	—	—		N/A	N/A	53

=== Individual starts (12) ===
winner (1); second (2); third (3); did not compete (–); failed to qualify (q)
Season	1	2	3	4	5	6	7	8	9	10	11	12	13	14	15	16	17	18	19	20	21	22	23	24	25	26	27	28	Points
2019/20	Wisła	Kuusamo	Nizhny Tagil	Nizhny Tagil	Klingenthal	Engelberg	Engelberg	Oberstdorf	Garmisch-Partenkirchen	Innsbruck	Bischofshofen	Val di Fiemme	Val di Fiemme	Titisee-Neustadt	Titisee-Neustadt	Zakopane	Sapporo	Sapporo	Willingen	Tauplitz	Tauplitz	Râșnov	Râșnov	Lahti	Lahti	Oslo	Lillehammer		0
2019/20	q	–	–	–	–	–	–	–	–	–	–	–	–	–	–	–	–	–	–	–	–	–	–	–	–	–	–		0
2020/21	Wisła	Ruka	Ruka	Nizhny Tagil	Nizhny Tagil	Engelberg	Engelberg	Oberstdorf	Garmisch-Partenkirchen	Innsbruck	Bischofshofen	Titisee-Neustadt	Titisee-Neustadt	Zakopane	Lahti	Willingen	Willingen	Klingenthal	Klingenthal	Szczyrk	Szczyrk	Râșnov	Planica	Planica	Planica				0
2020/21	–	–	–	–	–	–	–	–	q	48	47	–	–	46	46	–	–	–	–	46	41	–	q	51	–				0
2021/22	Nizhny Tagil	Nizhny Tagil	Ruka	Ruka	Wisła	Klingenthal	Klingenthal	Engelberg	Engelberg	Oberstdorf	Garmisch-Partenkirchen	Bischofshofen	Bischofshofen	Bischofshofen	Zakopane	Titisee-Neustadt	Titisee-Neustadt	Willingen	Willingen	Lahti	Lahti	Lillehammer	Oslo	Oslo	Oberstdorf	Oberstdorf	Planica	Planica	8
2021/22	q	–	–	–	q	q	35	47	48	q	–	–	q	q	–	q	q	26	28	–	–	–	–	–					8
