= 2023–24 ISU Short Track Speed Skating World Cup =

Short track speed skating series

2023–24 Short Track Speed Skating World Cup
| Discipline | Men | Women |
| Overall | (South Korea) Park Ji-won (3) | (South Korea) Kim Gil-li (1) |
| 500 m | (Canada) Jordan Pierre-Gilles (1) | (Netherlands) Xandra Velzeboer (2) |
| 1000 m | (South Korea) Park Ji-won (4) | (United States) Kristen Santos-Griswold (1) |
| 1500 m | (Canada) William Dandjinou (1) | (South Korea) Kim Gil-li (2) |
| Relay | Canada (11) | Netherlands (3) |
- 2000 m Mixed: Netherlands (1)

Competition
| Edition | 26th | 26th |
| Locations | 5 | 5 |
| Individual | 18 | 18 |
| Relay/Team | 6 | 6 |
| Mixed | 6 | 6 |

The 2023–24 ISU Short Track Speed Skating World Cup was a multi-race series over a season of short track speed skating, organised by the International Skating Union (ISU), which organised also runs world cups and championships in speed skating and figure skating. It was the 26th edition for men and women of the highest international race series in short track organised by the ISU.

The season started on 20 October 2023 in Montréal, Canada and ended on 18 February 2024 in Gdańsk, Poland.

The highlight of the season are the 2024 World Short Track Speed Skating Championships in Rotterdam, Netherlands, whose results are not included in the World Cup standings.

Park Ji-won from South Korea (men's) and Suzanne Schulting from The Netherlands (women's) were the reigning champions from the previous season, winning the first Crystal Globe. The Korean successfully defended his title, while the Dutch finished the season in 20th place in the general classification. Korean Kim Gil-li won the Crystal Globe in the category Women.

== Men ==
=== Calendar ===
| Stage | # | Date | Place | Discipline | Winner | Second | Third | R. |
|---|---|---|---|---|---|---|---|---|
| 1 | 1 | 21 October 2023 | (Canada) Montréal (Maurice Richard Arena) | 1000 m (1) | (South Korea) Park Ji-won | (Canada) Steven Dubois | (Italy) Pietro Sighel | |
| 1 | 2 | 21 October 2023 | (Canada) Montréal (Maurice Richard Arena) | 1500 m | (South Korea) Hwang Dae-heon | (Belgium) Stijn Desmet | (Latvia) Reinis Bērziņš | |
| 1 | 3 | 22 October 2023 | (Canada) Montréal (Maurice Richard Arena) | 500 m | (China) Liu Shaoang | (Canada) Félix Roussel | (France) Quentin Fercoq | |
| 1 | 4 | 22 October 2023 | (Canada) Montréal (Maurice Richard Arena) | 1000 m (2) | (South Korea) Kim Gun-woo | (Italy) Luca Spechenhauser | (Canada) William Dandjinou | |
| 1 | 5 | 22 October 2023 | (Canada) Montréal (Maurice Richard Arena) | 5000 m Relay | Canada | South Korea | Japan | |
| 2 | 6 | 28 October 2023 | (Canada) Montréal (Maurice Richard Arena) | 500 m | (Canada) Jordan Pierre-Gilles | (China) Liu Shaolin | (China) Lin Xiaojun | |
| 2 | 7 | 28 October 2023 | (Canada) Montréal (Maurice Richard Arena) | 1500 m (1) | (Canada) William Dandjinou | (South Korea) Hwang Dae-heon | (South Korea) Kim Gun-woo | |
| 2 | 8 | 29 October 2023 | (Canada) Montréal (Maurice Richard Arena) | 1000 m | (Netherlands) Jens van 't Wout | (South Korea) Hwang Dae-heon | (South Korea) Lee Jeongmin | |
| 2 | 9 | 29 October 2023 | (Canada) Montréal (Maurice Richard Arena) | 1500 m (2) | (South Korea) Kim Gun-woo | (South Korea) Park Ji-won | (Canada) Steven Dubois | |
| 2 | 10 | 29 October 2023 | (Canada) Montréal (Maurice Richard Arena) | 5000 m Relay | China | Canada | Kazakhstan | |
| 3 | 11 | 9 December 2023 | (China) Beijing (Capital Indoor Stadium) | 500 m (1) | (Canada) Jordan Pierre-Gilles | (France) Quentin Fercoq | (Netherlands) Jens van 't Wout | |
| 3 | 12 | 9 December 2023 | (China) Beijing (Capital Indoor Stadium) | 1500 m | (South Korea) Kim Gun-woo | (China) Li Wenlong | (Canada) William Dandjinou | |
| 3 | 13 | 10 December 2023 | (China) Beijing (Capital Indoor Stadium) | 500 m (2) | (Canada) Jordan Pierre-Gilles | (Canada) Steven Dubois | (China) Sun Long | |
| 3 | 14 | 10 December 2023 | (China) Beijing (Capital Indoor Stadium) | 1000 m | (China) Liu Shaoang | (South Korea) Park Ji-won | (South Korea) Jang Sungwoo | |
| 3 | 15 | 10 December 2023 | (China) Beijing (Capital Indoor Stadium) | 5000 m Relay | Canada | South Korea | China | |
| 4 | 16 | 16 December 2023 | (South Korea) Seoul (Mokdong Ice Rink) | 1000 m | (Canada) Steven Dubois | (South Korea) Hwang Dae-heon | (Canada) Pascal Dion | |
| 4 | 17 | 16 December 2023 | (South Korea) Seoul (Mokdong Ice Rink) | 1500 m (1) | (South Korea) Park Ji-won | (Canada) William Dandjinou | (Canada) Félix Roussel | |
| 4 | 18 | 17 December 2023 | (South Korea) Seoul (Mokdong Ice Rink) | 500 m | (China) Liu Shaoang | (South Korea) Seo Yi-ra | (Kazakhstan) Denis Nikisha | |
| 4 | 19 | 17 December 2023 | (South Korea) Seoul (Mokdong Ice Rink) | 1500 m (2) | (Canada) William Dandjinou | (South Korea) Park Ji-won | (Canada) Steven Dubois | |
| 4 | 20 | 17 December 2023 | (South Korea) Seoul (Mokdong Ice Rink) | 5000 m Relay | China | Netherlands | Belgium | |
| 5 | 21 | 10 February 2024 | (Germany) Dresden (Joynext Arena) | 1000 m (1) | (South Korea) Park Ji-won | (Canada) Félix Roussel | (Canada) Steven Dubois | |
| 5 | 22 | 10 February 2024 | (Germany) Dresden (Joynext Arena) | 1500 m | (Canada) William Dandjinou | (Belgium) Stijn Desmet | (South Korea) Kim Gun-woo | |
| 5 | 23 | 11 February 2024 | (Germany) Dresden (Joynext Arena) | 500 m | (Canada) Félix Roussel | (Canada) Jordan Pierre-Gilles | (Poland) Łukasz Kuczyński | |
| 5 | 24 | 11 February 2024 | (Germany) Dresden (Joynext Arena) | 1000 m (2) | (South Korea) Park Ji-won | (South Korea) Jang Sungwoo | (Kazakhstan) Adil Galiakhmetov | |
| 5 | 25 | 11 February 2024 | (Germany) Dresden (Joynext Arena) | 5000 m Relay | South Korea | Japan | Hungary | |
| 6 | 26 | 17 February 2024 | (Poland) Gdańsk (Hala Olivia) | 500 m (1) | (South Korea) Seo Yi-ra | (Canada) Steven Dubois | (Poland) Łukasz Kuczyński | |
| 6 | 27 | 17 February 2024 | (Poland) Gdańsk (Hala Olivia) | 1500 m | (Canada) Pascal Dion | (South Korea) Jang Sungwoo | (Netherlands) Friso Emons | |
| 6 | 28 | 18 February 2024 | (Poland) Gdańsk (Hala Olivia) | 1000 m | (South Korea) Park Ji-won | (South Korea) Kim Gun-woo | (Japan) Kosei Hayashi | |
| 6 | 29 | 18 February 2024 | (Poland) Gdańsk (Hala Olivia) | 500 m (2) | (Canada) Steven Dubois | (Kazakhstan) Denis Nikisha | (Poland) Michał Niewiński | |
| 6 | 30 | 18 February 2024 | (Poland) Gdańsk (Hala Olivia) | 5000 m Relay | Canada | South Korea | Japan | |
| 26th ISU Short Track World Cup Overall (21 October 2023 – 18 February 2024) | | | | | (South Korea) Park Ji-won | (Canada) Steven Dubois | (Canada) William Dandjinou | |
2024 World Short Track Speed Skating Championships (15–17 March) (Note: not included in the World Cup)

=== Standings ===
==== Overall ====
| Rank | after all 24 events | Points |
|---|---|---|
| 1 | (South Korea) Park Ji-won | 1071 |
| 2 | (Canada) Steven Dubois | 1052 |
| 3 | (Canada) William Dandjinou | 784 |
| 4 | (South Korea) Kim Gun-woo | 692 |
| 5 | (Canada) Félix Roussel | 576 |

==== 500 m ====
| Rank | after all 8 events | Points |
|---|---|---|
| 1 | (Canada) Jordan Pierre-Gilles | 486 |
| 2 | (Canada) Steven Dubois | 433 |
| 3 | (Canada) Félix Roussel | 369 |
| 4 | (Kazakhstan) Denis Nikisha | 355 |
| 5 | (South Korea) Seo Yi-ra | 337 |

==== 1000 m ====
| Rank | after all 8 events | Points |
|---|---|---|
| 1 | (South Korea) Park Ji-won | 625 |
| 2 | (Canada) Steven Dubois | 399 |
| 3 | (Italy) Luca Spechenhauser | 306 |
| 4 | (South Korea) Jang Sungwoo | 305 |
| 5 | (Canada) William Dandjinou | 284 |

==== 1500 m ====
| Rank | after all 8 events | Points |
|---|---|---|
| 1 | (Canada) William Dandjinou | 500 |
| 2 | (South Korea) Kim Gun-woo | 456 |
| 3 | (South Korea) Park Ji-won | 446 |
| 4 | (Canada) Pascal Dion | 329 |
| 5 | (Belgium) Stijn Desmet | 315 |

==== 5000 m Relay ====
| Rank | after all 6 events | Points |
|---|---|---|
| 1 | Canada | 380 |
| 2 | South Korea | 340 |
| 3 | China | 330 |
| 4 | Japan | 260 |
| 5 | Netherlands | 226 |

== Women ==
=== Calendar ===
| Stage | # | Date | Place | Discipline | Winner | Second | Third | R. |
|---|---|---|---|---|---|---|---|---|
| 1 | 1 | 21 October 2023 | (Canada) Montréal (Maurice Richard Arena) | 1000 m (1) | (United States) Kristen Santos-Griswold | (South Korea) Lee So-youn | (South Korea) Seo Whi-min | |
| 1 | 2 | 21 October 2023 | (Canada) Montréal (Maurice Richard Arena) | 1500 m | (Belgium) Hanne Desmet | (South Korea) Kim Gil-li | (United States) Corinne Stoddard | |
| 1 | 3 | 22 October 2023 | (Canada) Montréal (Maurice Richard Arena) | 500 m | (Netherlands) Xandra Velzeboer | (Netherlands) Selma Poutsma | (Italy) Martina Valcepina | |
| 1 | 4 | 22 October 2023 | (Canada) Montréal (Maurice Richard Arena) | 1000 m (2) | (South Korea) Kim Gil-li | (Belgium) Hanne Desmet | (United States) Kristen Santos-Griswold | |
| 1 | 5 | 22 October 2023 | (Canada) Montréal (Maurice Richard Arena) | 3000 m Relay | Canada | United States | Netherlands | |
| 2 | 6 | 28 October 2023 | (Canada) Montréal (Maurice Richard Arena) | 500 m | (Canada) Rikki Doak | (Netherlands) Selma Poutsma | (Italy) Martina Valcepina | |
| 2 | 7 | 28 October 2023 | (Canada) Montréal (Maurice Richard Arena) | 1500 m (1) | (South Korea) Kim Gil-li | (United States) Kristen Santos-Griswold | (Canada) Danae Blais | |
| 2 | 8 | 29 October 2023 | (Canada) Montréal (Maurice Richard Arena) | 1000 m | (South Korea) Seo Whi-min | (Canada) Danae Blais | (South Korea) Park Ji-yun | |
| 2 | 9 | 29 October 2023 | (Canada) Montréal (Maurice Richard Arena) | 1500 m (2) | (Belgium) Hanne Desmet | (South Korea) Kim Gil-li | (United States) Kristen Santos-Griswold | |
| 2 | 10 | 29 October 2023 | (Canada) Montréal (Maurice Richard Arena) | 3000 m Relay | South Korea | Netherlands | United States | |
| 3 | 11 | 9 December 2023 | (China) Beijing (Capital Indoor Stadium) | 500 m (1) | (United States) Kristen Santos-Griswold | (China) Fan Kexin | (China) Wang Ye | |
| 3 | 12 | 9 December 2023 | (China) Beijing (Capital Indoor Stadium) | 1500 m | (South Korea) Kim Gil-li | (China) Gong Li | (Netherlands) Xandra Velzeboer | |
| 3 | 13 | 10 December 2023 | (China) Beijing (Capital Indoor Stadium) | 500 m (2) | (Netherlands) Xandra Velzeboer | (Netherlands) Selma Poutsma | (China) Fan Kexin | |
| 3 | 14 | 10 December 2023 | (China) Beijing (Capital Indoor Stadium) | 1000 m | (United States) Kristen Santos-Griswold | (United States) Corinne Stoddard | (China) Gong Li | |
| 3 | 15 | 10 December 2023 | (China) Beijing (Capital Indoor Stadium) | 3000 m Relay | Netherlands | South Korea | Poland | |
| 4 | 16 | 16 December 2023 | (South Korea) Seoul (Mokdong Ice Rink) | 1000 m | (Belgium) Hanne Desmet | (United States) Kristen Santos-Griswold | (Netherlands) Xandra Velzeboer | |
| 4 | 17 | 16 December 2023 | (South Korea) Seoul (Mokdong Ice Rink) | 1500 m (1) | (South Korea) Kim Gil-li | (United States) Corinne Stoddard | (China) Gong Li | |
| 4 | 18 | 17 December 2023 | (South Korea) Seoul (Mokdong Ice Rink) | 500 m | (Netherlands) Xandra Velzeboer (Netherlands) Selma Poutsma | – | (China) Wang Ye | |
| 4 | 19 | 17 December 2023 | (South Korea) Seoul (Mokdong Ice Rink) | 1500 m (2) | (South Korea) Kim Gil-li | (United States) Kristen Santos-Griswold | (Belgium) Hanne Desmet | |
| 4 | 20 | 17 December 2023 | (South Korea) Seoul (Mokdong Ice Rink) | 3000 m Relay | Netherlands | South Korea | China | |
| 5 | 21 | 10 February 2024 | (Germany) Dresden (Joynext Arena) | 1000 m (1) | (South Korea) Kim Gil-li | (Netherlands) Xandra Velzeboer | (Poland) Kamila Stormowska | |
| 5 | 22 | 10 February 2024 | (Germany) Dresden (Joynext Arena) | 1500 m | (Belgium) Hanne Desmet | (United States) Kristen Santos-Griswold | (Netherlands) Suzanne Schulting | |
| 5 | 23 | 11 February 2024 | (Germany) Dresden (Joynext Arena) | 500 m | (Netherlands) Xandra Velzeboer | (China) Wang Ye | (Poland) Kamila Stormowska | |
| 5 | 24 | 11 February 2024 | (Germany) Dresden (Joynext Arena) | 1000 m (2) | (South Korea) Kim Gil-li | (Netherlands) Suzanne Schulting | (United States) Corinne Stoddard | |
| 5 | 25 | 11 February 2024 | (Germany) Dresden (Joynext Arena) | 3000 m Relay | Netherlands | Canada | United States | |
| 6 | 26 | 17 February 2024 | (Poland) Gdańsk (Hala Olivia) | 500 m (1) | (Netherlands) Selma Poutsma | (Belgium) Hanne Desmet | (Canada) Kim Boutin | |
| 6 | 27 | 17 February 2024 | (Poland) Gdańsk (Hala Olivia) | 1500 m | (United States) Kristen Santos-Griswold | (Netherlands) Suzanne Schulting | (United States) Corinne Stoddard | |
| 6 | 28 | 18 February 2024 | (Poland) Gdańsk (Hala Olivia) | 1000 m | (United States) Kristen Santos-Griswold | (South Korea) Kim Gil-li | (United States) Corinne Stoddard | |
| 6 | 29 | 18 February 2024 | (Poland) Gdańsk (Hala Olivia) | 500 m (2) | (Netherlands) Xandra Velzeboer | (Netherlands) Selma Poutsma | (South Korea) Shim Suk-hee | |
| 6 | 30 | 18 February 2024 | (Poland) Gdańsk (Hala Olivia) | 3000 m Relay | Netherlands | South Korea | United States | |
| 26th ISU Short Track World Cup Overall (21 October 2023 – 18 February 2024) | | | | | (South Korea) Kim Gil-li | (United States) Kristen Santos-Griswold | (Netherlands) Xandra Velzeboer | |
2024 World Short Track Speed Skating Championships (15–17 March)

=== Standings ===
==== Overall ====
| Rank | after all 24 events | Points |
|---|---|---|
| 1 | (South Korea) Kim Gil-li | 1211 |
| 2 | (United States) Kristen Santos-Griswold | 1180 |
| 3 | (Netherlands) Xandra Velzeboer | 1085 |
| 4 | (Belgium) Hanne Desmet | 999 |
| 5 | (United States) Corinne Stoddard | 791 |

==== 500 m ====
| Rank | after all 8 events | Points |
|---|---|---|
| 1 | (Netherlands) Xandra Velzeboer | 650 |
| 2 | (Netherlands) Selma Poutsma | 610 |
| 3 | (China) Wang Ye | 377 |
| 4 | (China) Fan Kexin | 308 |
| 5 | (Netherlands) Michelle Velzeboer | 279 |

==== 1000 m ====
| Rank | after all 8 events | Points |
|---|---|---|
| 1 | (United States) Kristen Santos-Griswold | 585 |
| 2 | (South Korea) Kim Gil-li | 540 |
| 3 | (United States) Corinne Stoddard | 372 |
| 4 | (Belgium) Hanne Desmet | 355 |
| 5 | (South Korea) Seo Whi-min | 283 |

==== 1500 m ====
| Rank | after all 8 events | Points |
|---|---|---|
| 1 | (South Korea) Kim Gil-li | 655 |
| 2 | (Belgium) Hanne Desmet | 504 |
| 3 | (United States) Kristen Santos-Griswold | 495 |
| 4 | (United States) Corinne Stoddard | 419 |
| 5 | (South Korea) Shim Suk Hee | 339 |

==== 3000 m Relay ====
| Rank | after all 6 events | Points |
|---|---|---|
| 1 | Netherlands | 400 |
| 2 | South Korea | 320 |
| 3 | Canada | 300 |
| 4 | United States | 290 |
| 5 | China | 214 |

== Mixed Relay ==
=== Calendar ===
| Stage | # | Date | Place | Winner | Second | Third | Ref. |
|---|---|---|---|---|---|---|---|
| 1 | 1 | 21 October 2023 | (Canada) Montréal (Maurice Richard Arena) | China | South Korea | Italy | |
| 2 | 2 | 28 October 2023 | (Canada) Montréal (Maurice Richard Arena) | China | Netherlands | Italy | |
| 3 | 3 | 9 December 2023 | (China) Beijing (Capital Indoor Stadium) | Netherlands | China | United States | |
| 4 | 4 | 16 December 2023 | (South Korea) Seoul (Mokdong Ice Rink) | Netherlands | Italy | United States (Note: Penalised); South Korea | |
| 5 | 5 | 10 February 2024 | (Germany) Dresden (Joynext Arena) | United States | Netherlands | South Korea | |
| 6 | 6 | 17 February 2024 | (Poland) Gdańsk (Hala Olivia) | Netherlands | South Korea | Canada | |
2024 World Short Track Speed Skating Championships (15–17 March)

=== Standings ===
| Rank | after all 6 events | Points |
|---|---|---|
| 1 | Netherlands | 380 |
| 2 | China | 330 |
| 3 | South Korea | 300 |
| 4 | United States | 284 |
| 5 | Italy | 280 |

== Podium table by nation ==
Table showing the World Cup podium places by the countries represented by the athletes.

| Rank | Nation | Gold | Silver | Bronze | Total |
|---|---|---|---|---|---|
| 1 | South Korea | 19 | 23 | 9 | 51 |
| 2 | Netherlands | 16 | 10 | 6 | 32 |
| 3 | Canada | 15 | 10 | 10 | 35 |
| 4 | China | 7 | 6 | 9 | 22 |
| 5 | United States | 6 | 7 | 11 | 24 |
| 6 | Belgium | 4 | 4 | 2 | 10 |
| 7 | Italy | 0 | 2 | 5 | 7 |
| 8 | Japan | 0 | 1 | 3 | 4 |
| 8 | Kazakhstan | 0 | 1 | 3 | 4 |
| 10 | France | 0 | 1 | 1 | 2 |
| 11 | Poland | 0 | 0 | 6 | 6 |
| 12 | Hungary | 0 | 0 | 1 | 1 |
| 12 | Latvia | 0 | 0 | 1 | 1 |
| Totals (13 entries) | | 67 | 65 | 67 | 199 |

== See also ==
- 2024 Four Continents Short Track Speed Skating Championships
- 2024 European Short Track Speed Skating Championships
- 2024 World Short Track Speed Skating Championships
