= 2025–26 ISU Short Track World Tour =

Short track speed skating series

Discipline	Men	Women
Overall	(Canada) William Dandjinou	(Canada) Courtney Sarault
500 m	(Canada) William Dandjinou	(Netherlands) Xandra Velzeboer
1000 m	(Italy) Pietro Sighel	(Canada) Courtney Sarault
1500 m	(Canada) William Dandjinou	(South Korea) Kim Gil-li
Relay	South Korea	Netherlands
- 2000 m Mixed: Netherlands

Competition
Edition	2nd	2nd
Locations	4	4
Individual	12	12
Relay/Team	4	4
Mixed	4	4

The 2025–26 ISU Short Track World Tour was a series of four short track speed skating events, organised by the International Skating Union (ISU). It was the second edition of the ISU Short Track World Tour. It started on 9 October 2025 and ended on 30 November 2025. Performance at the 2025–26 World Tour determined qualification for short track speed skating at the 2026 Winter Olympics.

== Events calendar ==
ISU communication 2717 designated the following events as World Tour Competitions:

Event	City	Date
1	(Canada) Montreal	9–12 October 2025
2	(Canada) Montreal	16–19 October 2025
3	(Poland) Gdańsk	20–23 November 2025
4	(Netherlands) Dordrecht	27–30 November 2025

== Format ==
Each event consists of a qualifying session and a main session. The qualifying session is held on the first two days and the morning of the third day. The main session is held on the third and fourth days. World Tour Points are awarded for performance in the main session only.

The qualifying session may consist of preliminaries, heats and quarterfinals, depending on the number of registered competitors per distance. The main session may consist of a repechage, quarterfinals, semifinals and finals.

Event format		Qualifying session	Main session	
Event format		Qualifying session	Day 3	Day 4
Men	500 m	H	R, QF, SF, F	
Men	1000 m	H		R, QF, SF, F
Men	1500 m	QF	R, SF, F	
Men	5000 m relay	QF	SF	F
Women	500 m	H		R, QF, SF, F
Women	1000 m	H	R, QF, SF, F	
Women	1500 m	QF		R, SF, F
Women	3000 m relay		SF, F	
Mixed	2000 m relay	QF	SF	F

== Entry rules ==
=== Maximum number of competitors ===
Each ISU member country may register up to a maximum of 6 men and 6 women per event. Each ISU member determines its own selection procedure. For team USA, national qualifiers are held from 11-14 September 2025. Team Canada is selected based on performance in the previous season. A maximum of three competitors per country can participate in any individual distance.

=== Qualifying times ===
All competitors must have achieved a qualifying time over 500 meters at an official ISU event after July 1st, 2023. Competitors must achieve a time of 45.04 seconds (men) or 47.21 seconds (women) if they are their country´s sole representative. Competitors from ISU member countries that register more than one competitor per category must meet a qualifying time of 43.46 seconds (men) or 45.56 seconds (women).

	Qualifying times in seconds over 500 meter	
	ISU members with only one competitor	ISU members with more than one competitor
men	45.04	43.46
women	47.21	45.56

== Points and classifications ==
Skaters and teams score points per distance in each of the four events.

=== World Tour rankings ===
The World Tour ranking per distance is established by the sum of the best three scores of each competitor. An overall individual ranking is established by the best nine scores of each skater across all individual distances.The winner is awarded the Crystal Globe for best short-track speed skater of the World Tour. An overall World Team Classification is computed by adding all individual results from all categories plus three times the score in each team event. The winning team is awarded the Crystal Globe for best short-track team of the World Tour.

=== Special Olympic Qualification Classifications ===
The Olympic Qualification Classification uses the points awarded for the World Ranking. In each race, the highest placed skater of a country earns points for the first olympic quota place of that country. The country´s second placed skater earns points for the second quota place of that country and the country´s third placed skater earns points for the third quota place of that country. The best three of four results count to determine quota place allocation for the 2026 Winter Olympics.

World Tour Points		World Ranking and Olympic Classification points					
Place	Points	Place	Points	Place	Points	Place	Points
1	100	1	10,000	25	269	49	21
2	80	2	8,500	26	242	50	19
3	70	3	7,225	27	218	51	18
4	60	4	6,141	28	196	52	17
5	50	5	5,220	29	177	53	16
6	44	6	4,437	30	159	54	15
7	40	7	3,771	31	143	55	14
8	36	8	3,206	32	129	56	13
9	32	9	2,725	33	116	57	12
10	28	10	2,316	34	104	58	11
11	24	11	1,969	35	94	59	10
12	20	12	1,673	36	84	60	9
13	18	13	1,422	37	76	61	8
14	16	14	1,209	38	68	62	7
15	14	15	1,028	39	62	63	6
16	12	16	874	40	55	64	5
17	10	17	743	41	50	65	4
18	8	18	631	42	45	66	3
19	6	19	536	43	40	67	2
20	5	20	456	44	36	68 and above	1
21	4	21	410	45	33		
22	3	22	369	46	29		
23	2	23	332	47	27		
24	1	24	299	48	24		

== Men ==
=== Results ===
Stage	#	Date	Place	Discipline	Winner	Second	Third	R.
1	1	11 October	(Canada) Montréal (Maurice Richard Arena)	1500m	(South Korea) Rim Jong-un	(South Korea) Hwang Dae-heon	(China) Sun Long	
1	2	11 October	(Canada) Montréal (Maurice Richard Arena)	500m	(Canada) William Dandjinou	(Italy) Pietro Sighel	(Canada) Steven Dubois	
1	3	12 October	(Canada) Montréal (Maurice Richard Arena)	1000m	(Italy) Pietro Sighel	(South Korea) Rim Jong-un	(China) Liu Shaoang	
1	4	12 October	(Canada) Montréal (Maurice Richard Arena)	5000m relay	South Korea	China	Italy	
2	1	18 October	(Canada) Montréal (Maurice Richard Arena)	1500m	(Canada) William Dandjinou	(Japan) Shogo Miyata	(Canada) Steven Dubois	
2	2	18 October	(Canada) Montréal (Maurice Richard Arena)	500m	(Canada) William Dandjinou	(China) Liu Shaoang	(China) Sun Long	
2	3	19 October	(Canada) Montréal (Maurice Richard Arena)	1000m	(Canada) William Dandjinou	(Canada) Steven Dubois	(South Korea) Hwang Dae-heon	
2	4	19 October	(Canada) Montréal (Maurice Richard Arena)	5000m relay	Canada	Netherlands	Italy	
3	1	22 November	(Poland) Gdansk (Hala Olivia)	1500m	(Canada) William Dandjinou	(Italy) Thomas Nadalini	(Italy) Pietro Sighel	
3	2	22 November	(Poland) Gdansk (Hala Olivia)	500m	(Canada) William Dandjinou	(China) Lin Xiaojun	(Canada) Steven Dubois	
3	3	23 November	(Poland) Gdansk (Hala Olivia)	1000m	(Netherlands) Jens van 't Wout	(Italy) Pietro Sighel	(Canada) Steven Dubois	
3	4	23 November	(Poland) Gdansk (Hala Olivia)	5000m relay	South Korea	China	Italy	
4	1	29 November	(Netherlands) Dordrecht (Sportboulevard)	1500m	(Canada) William Dandjinou	(Canada) Félix Roussel	(China) Sun Long	
4	2	29 November	(Netherlands) Dordrecht (Sportboulevard)	500m	(United States) Andrew Heo	(Canada) William Dandjinou	(Poland) Félix Pigeon	
4	3	30 November	(Netherlands) Dordrecht (Sportboulevard)	1000m	(South Korea) Rim Jong-un	(China) Liu Shaoang	(Italy) Pietro Sighel	
4	4	30 November	(Netherlands) Dordrecht (Sportboulevard)	5000m relay	Netherlands	China	Italy	

=== Standings ===
==== Overall ====
Rank	after 16 of 16 events	Points
1	(Canada) William Dandjinou	876
2	(Italy) Pietro Sighel	664
3	(Canada) Steven Dubois	590
4	(China) Sun Long	510
5	(China) Liu Shaoang	460

==== 500m ====
Rank	after 4 of 4 events	Points
1	(Canada) William Dandjinou	300
2	(Italy) Pietro Sighel	190
3	(Canada) Steven Dubois	184
4	(China) Liu Shaoang	152
5	(China) Sun Long	146

==== 1000m ====
Rank	after 4 of 4 events	Points
1	(Italy) Pietro Sighel	300
2	(Canada) Steven Dubois	244
3	(China) Liu Shaoang	232
4	(South Korea) Rim Jong-un	224
5	(Canada) William Dandjinou	186

==== 1500m ====
Rank	after 4 of 4 events	Points
1	(Canada) William Dandjinou	300
2	(Italy) Thomas Nadalini	200
3	(Japan) Shogo Miyata	190
4	(China) Sun Long	180
5	(Canada) Felix Roussel	164

==== 5000m Relay ====
Rank	after 4 of 4 events	Points
1	South Korea	250
2	Netherlands	240
3	China	240
4	Italy	210
5	Canada	210

== Women ==
=== Results ===
Stage	#	Date	Place	Discipline	Winner	Second	Third	R.
1	1	11 October	(Canada) Montréal (Maurice Richard Arena)	1500m	(Canada) Courtney Sarault	(South Korea) Kim Gil-li	(United States) Corinne Stoddard	
1	2	11 October	(Canada) Montréal (Maurice Richard Arena)	500m	(Netherlands) Xandra Velzeboer	(Canada) Kim Boutin	(United States) Corinne Stoddard	
1	3	12 October	(Canada) Montréal (Maurice Richard Arena)	1000m	(Canada) Courtney Sarault	(South Korea) Kim Gil-li	(United States) Corinne Stoddard	
1	4	12 October	(Canada) Montréal (Maurice Richard Arena)	3000m relay	South Korea	Netherlands	Canada	
2	1	18 October	(Canada) Montréal (Maurice Richard Arena)	1500m	(South Korea) Choi Min-jeong	(United States) Corinne Stoddard	(United States) Kristen Santos-Griswold	
2	2	18 October	(Canada) Montréal (Maurice Richard Arena)	500m	(Netherlands) Xandra Velzeboer	(Canada) Courtney Sarault	(United States) Kristen Santos-Griswold	
2	3	19 October	(Canada) Montréal (Maurice Richard Arena)	1000m	(Canada) Courtney Sarault	(South Korea) Choi Min-jeong	(Netherlands) Xandra Velzeboer	
2	4	19 October	(Canada) Montréal (Maurice Richard Arena)	3000m relay	Canada	South Korea	Japan	
3	1	22 November	(Poland) Gdansk (Hala Olivia)	1500m	(South Korea) Kim Gil-li	(South Korea) Choi Min-jeong	(Canada) Courtney Sarault	
3	2	22 November	(Poland) Gdansk (Hala Olivia)	500m	(Netherlands) Xandra Velzeboer	(United States) Corinne Stoddard	(South Korea) Choi Min-jeong	
3	3	23 November	(Poland) Gdansk (Hala Olivia)	1000m	(Belgium) Hanne Desmet	(Canada) Courtney Sarault	(United States) Corinne Stoddard	
3	4	23 November	(Poland) Gdansk (Hala Olivia)	3000m relay	Netherlands	United States	Japan	
4	1	29 November	(Netherlands) Dordrecht (Sportboulevard)	1500m	(South Korea) Kim Gil-li	(Canada) Courtney Sarault	(South Korea) Choi Min-jeong	
4	2	29 November	(Netherlands) Dordrecht (Sportboulevard)	500m	(Canada) Courtney Sarault	(United States) Corinne Stoddard	(Canada) Florence Brunelle	
4	3	30 November	(Netherlands) Dordrecht (Sportboulevard)	1000m	(Canada) Courtney Sarault	(United States) Corinne Stoddard	(Belgium) Hanne Desmet	
4	4	30 November	(Netherlands) Dordrecht (Sportboulevard)	3000m relay	Netherlands	Italy	United States	

=== Standings ===
==== Overall ====
Rank	after 16 of 16 events	Points
1	(Canada) Courtney Sarault	980
2	(United States) Corinne Stoddard	830
3	(Netherlands) Xandra Velzeboer	708
4	(South Korea) Choi Min-jeong	650
5	(South Korea) Kim Gil-li	546

==== 500m ====
Rank	after 4 of 4 events	Points
1	(Netherlands) Xandra Velzeboer	300
2	(Canada) Courtney Sarault	240
3	(United States) Corinne Stoddard	230
4	(Netherlands) Michelle Velzeboer	154
5	(United States) Kristen Santos-Griswold	154

==== 1000m ====
Rank	after 4 of 4 events	Points
1	(Canada) Courtney Sarault	300
2	(Belgium) Hanne Desmet	230
3	(United States) Corinne Stoddard	220
4	(Netherlands) Xandra Velzeboer	180
5	(South Korea) Choi Min-jeong	152

==== 1500m ====
Rank	after 4 of 4 events	Points
1	(South Korea) Kim Gil-li	280
2	(Canada) Courtney Sarault	250
3	(South Korea) Choi Min-jeong	250
4	(United States) Corinne Stoddard	210
5	(Italy) Elisa Confortola	142

==== 3000m Relay ====
Rank	after 4 of 4 events	Points
1	Netherlands	280
2	South Korea	240
3	Canada	220
4	Italy	200
5	United States	200

== Mixed ==
=== Results ===
Stage	Date	Place	Winner	Second	Third	R.
1	11 October	(Canada) Montréal (Maurice Richard Arena)	China	Netherlands	Canada	
2	18 October	(Canada) Montréal (Maurice Richard Arena)	Canada	South Korea	Poland	
3	22 November	(Poland) Gdansk (Hala Olivia)	South Korea	Netherlands	Canada	
4	30 November	(Netherlands) Dordrecht (Sportboulevard)	Netherlands	United States	South Korea	

=== Standings ===
==== Overall teams ====
Rank	after 36 of 36 events	Points
1	Canada	5656
2	Netherlands	4807
3	South Korea	4682
4	Italy	4099
5	China	3769

==== 2000m Mixed Team Relay ====
Rank	after 4 of 4 events	Points
1	Netherlands	260
2	South Korea	250
3	Canada	240
4	China	210
5	United States	164

== Podium table by nation ==
Table showing the World Tour podium places per country after 36 of 36 medal races.

Rank	Nation	Gold	Silver	Bronze	Total
1	Canada	15	7	9	31
2	South Korea	9	8	4	21
3	Netherlands	8	4	1	13
4	United States	1	6	7	14
5	China	1	6	4	11
6	Italy	1	4	6	11
7	Belgium	1	0	1	2
8	Japan	0	1	2	3
9	Poland	0	0	2	2
Totals (9 entries)		36	36	36	108
