= Four Continents Short Track Speed Skating Championships =

Annual short-track speed-skating competition

Four Continents Short Track Speed Skating Championships is an annual short-track speed-skating competition. It was established by the International Skating Union in 2019 to allow athletes from outside Europe to compete at the event. Its inaugural event was held in 2020, while its second and third editions were cancelled in 2021 and 2022 due to the coronavirus pandemic. The second edition of the event was held from 10–12 November 2022 in Salt Lake City, United States of America. The 2025 edition, scheduled for November 2024, was cancelled due to track safety concerns.

== Editions of the games ==
- 2020: Montreal, Canada
- 2023: Salt Lake City, United States
- 2024: Laval, Canada
- ~~2025: Salt Lake City, United States~~
- ~~2026: Montreal, Canada~~

== Medal holders ==
=== Men's events ===
==== 500 metres ====
| Event | Gold | | Silver | | Bronze | |
|---|---|---|---|---|---|---|
| 2020 | Hwang Dae-heon; South Korea | 40.695 | Steven Dubois; Canada | 40.799 | Kim Da-gyeom; South Korea | 40.923 |
| 2023 | Steven Dubois; Canada | 40.316 | Andrew Heo; United States | 40.687 | Pascal Dion; Canada | 41.482 |
| 2024 | Steven Dubois; Canada | 40.149 | Jordan Pierre-Gilles; Canada | 40.183 | Andrew Heo; United States | 40.299 |

==== 1000 metres ====
| Event | Gold | | Silver | | Bronze | |
|---|---|---|---|---|---|---|
| 2020 | Hwang Dae-heon; South Korea | 1:27.719 | Steven Dubois; Canada | 1:27.897 | Park Ji-won; South Korea | 1:28.033 |
| 2023 | Park Ji-won; South Korea | 1:27.548 | Pascal Dion; Canada | 1:27.592 | William Dandjinou; Canada | 1:27.816 |
| 2024 | William Dandjinou; Canada | 1:28.338 | Park Ji-won; South Korea | 1:28.664 | Yui Matsubayashi; Japan | 1:28.939 |

==== 1500 metres ====
| Event | Gold | | Silver | | Bronze | |
|---|---|---|---|---|---|---|
| 2020 | Hwang Dae-heon; South Korea | 2:21.140 | Steven Dubois; Canada | 2:21.475 | Thomas Hong; United States | 2:21.627 |
| 2023 | Park Ji-won; South Korea | 2:16.409 | Hong Kyung-hwan; South Korea | 2:16.471 | Steven Dubois; Canada | 2:16.702 |
| 2024 | Park Ji-won; South Korea | 2:33.158 | Steven Dubois; Canada | 2:33.228 | Kim Gun-woo; South Korea | 2:33.324 |

==== 5000 metre relay ====
| Event | Gold | | Silver | | Bronze | |
|---|---|---|---|---|---|---|
| 2020 | South Korea; Hwang Dae-heon; Lee June-seo; Park Ji-won; Kim Da-gyeom | 6:58.666 | Canada; Steven Dubois; Charles Hamelin; Pascal Dion; Cédrik Blais | 6:58.892 | United States; Aaron Tran; Thomas Hong; Andrew Heo; Ryan Pivirotto | 6:59.891 |
| 2023 | China; Li Kun; Liu Guanyi; Song Jiahua; Zhong Yuchen | 6:54.766 | Japan; Hayashi Kosei; Iwasa Dan; Shigehiro Kiichi; Oshinaga Kazuki | 6:56.071 | South Korea; Lee June-seo; Park Ji-won; Lim Yong-jin; Lee Dong-hyun | 7:12.956 |
| 2024 | South Korea; Park Ji-won; Kim Gun-woo; Lee Jeongmin; Jang Sung-woo; Seo Yi-ra | 7:13.143 | China; Li Wenlong; Liu Guanyi; Liu Jinxun; Zhu Yiding; Zhong Yuchen | 7:13.463 | Canada; Jérôme Courtemanche; Steven Dubois; Jordan Pierre-Gilles; William Dandjinou | 7:13.556 |

=== Women's events ===
==== 500 metres ====
| Event | Gold | | Silver | | Bronze | |
|---|---|---|---|---|---|---|
| 2020 | Choi Min-jeong; South Korea | 43.684 | Alyson Charles; Canada | 43.787 | Courtney Sarault; Canada | 44.007 |
| 2023 | Shim Suk-hee; South Korea | 43.273 | Kristen Santos-Griswold; United States | 43.302 | Zhang Chutong; China | 43.503 |
| 2024 | Kristen Santos-Griswold; United States | 42.76 | Park Ji-won; South Korea | 44.192 | Shim Suk-hee; South Korea | 45.873 |

==== 1000 metres ====
| Event | Gold | | Silver | | Bronze | |
|---|---|---|---|---|---|---|
| 2020 | Choi Min-jeong; South Korea | 1:32.712 | Courtney Sarault; Canada | 1:33.014 | Kim A-lang; South Korea | 1:33.108 |
| 2023 | Courtney Sarault; Canada | 1:28.615 | Gong Li; China | 1:28.840 | Claudia Gagnon; Canada | 1:28.963 |
| 2024 | Kristen Santos-Griswold; United States | 1:28.706 | Courtney Sarault; Canada | 1:29.208 | Danae Blais; Canada | 1:30.613 |

==== 1500 metres ====
| Event | Gold | | Silver | | Bronze | |
|---|---|---|---|---|---|---|
| 2020 | Choi Min-jeong; South Korea | 2:41.270 | Seo Whi-min; South Korea | 2:41.367 | Maame Biney; United States | 2:41.417 |
| 2023 | Courtney Sarault; Canada | 2:25.614 | Kristen Santos-Griswold; United States | 2:25.708 | Choi Min-jeong; South Korea | 2:25.737 |
| 2024 | Kristen Santos-Griswold; United States | 2:26.191 | Courtney Sarault; Canada | 2:26.657 | Danae Blais; Canada | 2:26.765 |

==== 3000 metre relay ====
| Event | Gold | | Silver | | Bronze | |
|---|---|---|---|---|---|---|
| 2020 | South Korea; Choi Min-jeong; Kim Ji-yoo; Noh Ah-reum; Kim A-lang | 4:11.404 | Canada; Courtney Sarault; Alyson Charles; Claudia Gagnon; Danaé Blais | 4:12.028 | China China; Li Xuan; Guo Yihan; Song Yang; Xu Aili | 4:12.239 |
| 2023 | South Korea; Choi Min-jeong; Kim Gil-li; Lee So-youn; Shim Suk-hee | 4:04.767 | Canada; Ann-Sophie Bachand; Claudia Gagnon; Courtney Sarault; Renee Marie Steenge | 4:05.049 | United States; Eunice Lee; Julie Lethal; Kristen Santos; Corinne Stoddard | 4:06.964 |
| 2024 | Canada; Danae Blais; Florence Brunelle; Cynthia Mascitto; Courtney Sarault; Karina Montminy | 4:14.513 | South Korea; Lee So-youn; Park Ji-won; Park Ji-yun; Shim Suk-hee; Kim A-lang | 4:14.567 | Kazakhstan; Alina Azhgalieva; Yana Khan; Malika Yermek; Madina Zhanbussinova; Olga Tikhonova | 4:16.200 |

=== Mixed 2000m relay ===
| Event | Gold | | Silver | | Bronze | |
|---|---|---|---|---|---|---|
| 2023 | United States; Andrew Heo; Marcus Howard; Kristen Santos; Corinne Stoddard | 2:38.095 | China; Gong Li; Li Kun; Wang Xinran; Zhong Yuchen | 2:38.244 | Canada; Steven Dubois; Maxime Laoun; Courtney Sarault; Lea Tessier | 2:48.548 |
| 2024 | Canada; Florence Brunelle; Steven Dubois; Jordan Pierre-Gilles; Courtney Sarault; William Sohier | 2:39.752 | United States; Andrew Heo; Marcus Howard; Kristen Santos; Julie Letai | 2:40.243 | China; Hao Weiying; Li Wenlong; Liu Guanyi; Song Jiarui; Zhang Yuting; Zhong Yuchen | 2:40.306 |

== Accumulative medal summary ==
| Rank | Nation | Gold | Silver | Bronze | Total |
|---|---|---|---|---|---|
| 1 | South Korea (KOR) | 14 | 5 | 7 | 26 |
| 2 | Canada (CAN) | 7 | 13 | 9 | 29 |
| 3 | United States (USA) | 4 | 4 | 5 | 13 |
| 4 | China (CHN) | 1 | 3 | 3 | 7 |
| 5 | Japan (JPN) | 0 | 1 | 1 | 2 |
| 6 | Kazakhstan (KAZ) | 0 | 0 | 1 | 1 |
| Totals (6 entries) | | 26 | 26 | 26 | 78 |

== Sources ==
- 2020: Results book
- 2023: Results book
