= 2024 Four Continents Short Track Speed Skating Championships =

- Location: Laval, Canada
- Dates: 4–5 November 2023
- Competitors: 64 from 9 nations

The 2024 Four Continents Short Track Speed Skating Championships was the third edition of the Four Continents Short Track Speed Skating Championships, which was held from 4 to 5 November 2023 in Laval, Canada. Skaters from 9 countries participated in the competition.

== Medal summary ==
=== Men's events ===
Event	Gold		Silver		Bronze	
500 metres	Steven Dubois; Canada	40.149	Jordan Pierre-Gilles; Canada	40.183	Andrew Heo; United States	40.299
1000 metres	William Dandjinou; Canada	1:28.338	Park Ji-won; South Korea	1:28.664	Yui Matsubayashi; Japan	1:28.939
1500 metres	Park Ji-won; South Korea	2:33.158	Steven Dubois; Canada	2:33.228	Kim Gun-woo; South Korea	2:33.324
5000 metres relay	South Korea; Jang Sung-woo; Kim Gun-woo; Lee Jeong-min; Park Ji-won; Seo Yi-ra	7:13.143	China; Li Wenlong; Liu Guanyi; Liu Jinxun; Zhu Yiding; Zhong Yuchen	7:13.463	Canada; Jérôme Courtemanche; William Dandjinou; Steven Dubois; Jordan Pierre-Gilles	7:13.556

=== Women's events ===
Event	Gold		Silver		Bronze	
500 metres	Kristen Santos-Griswold; United States	42.760	Park Ji-won; South Korea	44.192	Shim Suk-hee; South Korea	45.873
1000 metres	Kristen Santos-Griswold; United States	1:28.706	Courtney Sarault; Canada	1:29.208	Danae Blais; Canada	1:30.613
1500 metres	Kristen Santos-Griswold; United States	2:26.191	Courtney Sarault; Canada	2:26.657	Danae Blais; Canada	2:26.765
3000 metres relay	Canada; Danae Blais; Florence Brunelle; Cynthia Mascitto; Courtney Sarault; Karina Montminy	4:14.513	South Korea; Lee So-youn; Park Ji-won; Park Ji-yun; Shim Suk-hee; Kim A-lang	4:14.567	Kazakhstan; Alina Azhgalieva; Yana Khan; Malika Yermek; Madina Zhanbussinova; Olga Tikhonova	4:16.200

=== Mixed event ===
Event	Gold		Silver		Bronze	
2000 metre relay	Canada; Florence Brunelle; Steven Dubois; Jordan Pierre-Gilles; Courtney Sarault; William Sohier	2:39.752	United States; Andrew Heo; Marcus Howard; Kristen Santos-Griswold; Julie Letai	2:40.243	China; Hao Weiying; Li Wenlong; Liu Guanyi; Song Jiarui; Zhang Yuting; Zhong Yuchen	2:40.306

== Medal table ==
* Host nation (Canada)

Rank	Nation	Gold	Silver	Bronze	Total
1	Canada*	4	4	3	11
2	United States	3	1	1	5
3	South Korea	2	3	2	7
4	China	0	1	1	2
5	Japan	0	0	1	1
5	Kazakhstan	0	0	1	1
Totals (6 entries)		9	9	9	27
