= 2024–25 ISU Short Track World Tour =

Short track speed skating series

Discipline	Men	Women
Overall	(Canada) William Dandjinou	(United States) Kristen Santos-Griswold
500 m	(Canada) Steven Dubois	(United States) Kristen Santos-Griswold
1000 m	(Canada) William Dandjinou	(Netherlands) Xandra Velzeboer
1500 m	(Canada) William Dandjinou	(Belgium) Hanne Desmet
Relay	Canada	Italy and Canada
- 2000 m Mixed: Netherlands

Competition
Edition	1st	1st
Locations	6	6
Individual	18	18
Relay/Team	6	6
Mixed	6	6

The 2024–25 ISU Short Track World Tour was a multi-race series over a season of short track speed skating, organised by the International Skating Union (ISU), which also ran World Cups and Championships in speed skating and figure skating. It was the 1st edition of the ISU Short Track World Tour. It started on 25 October 2024 and ended on 16 February 2025. The Crystal Globe for overall winners of the World Tour were awarded to William Dandjinou, Kristen Santos-Griswold and Team Canada.

== Calendar ==
As per the Communication No. 2648 of ISU, the ISU has designated the following competitions as "World Tour Competitions" as part of the world tour.

Event	City	Date	Remark
1	(Canada) Montreal	25–27 October 2024	
2	(Canada) Montreal	1–3 November 2024	Relocated from (United States) Salt Lake City
3	(China) Beijing	6–8 December 2024	
4	(South Korea) Seoul	13–15 December 2024	
5	(Netherlands) Tilburg	7–9 February 2025	
6	(Italy) Milan	14–16 February 2025	2026 Olympics test event

== Men ==
=== Calendar ===
Stage	#	Date	Place	Discipline	Winner	Second	Third	R.
1	1	26 October	(Canada) Montreal (Maurice Richard Arena)	1500m	(Canada) William Dandjinou	(South Korea) Park Ji-won	(Canada) Steven Dubois	
1	2	26 October	(Canada) Montreal (Maurice Richard Arena)	500m	(Canada) William Dandjinou	(Canada) Steven Dubois	(China) Lin Xiaojun	
1	3	27 October	(Canada) Montreal (Maurice Richard Arena)	1000m	(Netherlands) Jens van 't Wout	(Latvia) Roberts Krūzbergs	(Poland) Michał Niewiński	
1	4	27 October	(Canada) Montreal (Maurice Richard Arena)	5000m relay	Canada	China	Netherlands	
2	1	2 November	(Canada) Montreal (Maurice Richard Arena)	1500m	(Canada) William Dandjinou	(Latvia) Roberts Krūzbergs	(Italy) Pietro Sighel	
2	2	2 November	(Canada) Montreal (Maurice Richard Arena)	500m	(Canada) Steven Dubois	(Canada) William Dandjinou	(Italy) Pietro Sighel	
2	3	3 November	(Canada) Montreal (Maurice Richard Arena)	1000m	(Canada) William Dandjinou	(South Korea) Jang Sung-woo	(Canada) Jordan Pierre-Gilles	
2	4	3 November	(Canada) Montreal (Maurice Richard Arena)	5000m relay	Canada	South Korea	Italy	
3	1	7 December	(China) Beijing (Capital Indoor Stadium)	1500m	(South Korea) Park Ji-won	(Canada) William Dandjinou	(China) Sun Long	
3	2	7 December	(China) Beijing (Capital Indoor Stadium)	500m	(China) Sun Long	(Canada) Steven Dubois	(China) Shaoang Liu	
3	3	8 December	(China) Beijing (Capital Indoor Stadium)	1000m	(Canada) Félix Roussel	(Poland) Michał Niewiński	(United Kingdom) Niall Treacy	
3	4	8 December	(China) Beijing (Capital Indoor Stadium)	5000m relay	China	South Korea	Netherlands	
4	1	14 December	(South Korea) Seoul (Mokdong Ice Rink)	1500m	(Canada) William Dandjinou	(South Korea) Park Ji-won	(Netherlands) Jens van 't Wout	
4	2	14 December	(South Korea) Seoul (Mokdong Ice Rink)	500m	(Canada) Steven Dubois	(Canada) Jordan Pierre-Gilles	(Latvia) Roberts Krūzbergs	
4	3	15 December	(South Korea) Seoul (Mokdong Ice Rink)	1000m	(Canada) William Dandjinou	(Netherlands) Jens van 't Wout	(South Korea) Jang Sung-woo	
4	4	15 December	(South Korea) Seoul (Mokdong Ice Rink)	5000m relay	China	Japan	South Korea	
5	1	8 February	(Netherlands) Tilburg (IJssportcentrum Tilburg)	1500m	(Canada) William Dandjinou	(Netherlands) Jens van ´t Wout	(Italy) Pietro Sighel	
5	2	8 February	(Netherlands) Tilburg (IJssportcentrum Tilburg)	500m	(Canada) Steven Dubois	(Canada) Jordan Pierre-Gilles	(Netherlands) Jens van ´t Wout	
5	3	9 February	(Netherlands) Tilburg (IJssportcentrum Tilburg)	1000m	(Netherlands) Jens van ´t Wout	(Latvia) Roberts Krūzbergs	(Netherlands) Daan Kos	
5	4	9 February	(Netherlands) Tilburg (IJssportcentrum Tilburg)	5000m relay	Netherlands	Belgium	Italy	
6	1	15 February	(Italy) Milan (Forum di Milano)	1500m	(Netherlands) Jens van ´t Wout	(Japan) Kosei Hayashi	(South Korea) Jang Sung-woo	
6	2	15 February	(Italy) Milan (Forum di Milano)	500m	(China) Sun Long	(Netherlands) Teun Boer	(Italy) Pietro Sighel	
6	3	16 February	(Italy) Milan (Forum di Milano)	1000m	(Canada) William Dandjinou	(Italy) Pietro Sighel	(South Korea) Jang Sung-woo	
6	4	16 February	(Italy) Milan (Forum di Milano)	5000m relay	Italy	Canada	Kazakhstan	

=== Standings ===
==== Overall ====
Rank	after 24 of 24 events	Points
1	(Canada) William Dandjinou	1148
2	(Netherlands) Jens van 't Wout	950
3	(Italy) Pietro Sighel	764
4	(Canada) Steven Dubois	740
5	(Japan) Shogo Miyata	614

==== 500m ====
Rank	after 6 of 6 events	Points
1	(Canada) Steven Dubois	460
2	(Canada) William Dandjinou	312
3	(Canada) Jordan Pierre-Gilles	268
3	(Italy) Pietro Sighel	268
3	(Netherlands) Jens van 't Wout	268

==== 1000m ====
Rank	after 6 of 6 events	Points
1	(Canada) William Dandjinou	380
2	(Netherlands) Jens van 't Wout	360
3	(Latvia) Roberts Krūzbergs	294
4	(South Korea) Jang Sung-woo	248
5	(Canada) Félix Roussel	246

==== 1500m ====
Rank	after 6 of 6 events	Points
1	(Canada) William Dandjinou	480
2	(South Korea) Park Ji-won	320
3	(Netherlands) Jens van 't Wout	314
4	(Italy) Pietro Sighel	256
5	(South Korea) Jang Sung-woo	254

==== 5000 m Relay ====
Rank	after 6 of 6 events	Points
1	Canada	400
2	China	390
3	Italy	360
4	Netherlands	336
5	South Korea	304

== Women ==
=== Calendar ===
Stage	#	Date	Place	Discipline	Winner	Second	Third	R.
1	1	26 October	(Canada) Montreal (Maurice Richard Arena)	1000m	(Netherlands) Xandra Velzeboer	(United States) Kristen Santos-Griswold	(United States) Corinne Stoddard	
1	2	26 October	(Canada) Montreal (Maurice Richard Arena)	3000m relay	Italy	South Korea	Netherlands	
1	3	27 October	(Canada) Montreal (Maurice Richard Arena)	1500m	(South Korea) Kim Gil-li	(Belgium) Hanne Desmet	(South Korea) Choi Min-jeong	
1	4	27 October	(Canada) Montreal (Maurice Richard Arena)	500m	(Netherlands) Xandra Velzeboer	(United States) Kristen Santos-Griswold	(Belgium) Hanne Desmet	
2	1	2 November	(Canada) Montreal (Maurice Richard Arena)	1000m	(South Korea) Choi Min-jeong	(Netherlands) Xandra Velzeboer	(United States) Corinne Stoddard	
2	2	2 November	(Canada) Montreal (Maurice Richard Arena)	3000m relay	Canada	Italy	China	
2	3	3 November	(Canada) Montreal (Maurice Richard Arena)	1500m	(Belgium) Hanne Desmet	(South Korea) Kim Gil-li	(United States) Corinne Stoddard	
2	4	3 November	(Canada) Montreal (Maurice Richard Arena)	500m	(Netherlands) Xandra Velzeboer	(South Korea) Choi Min-jeong	(South Korea) Kim Gil-li	
3	1	7 December	(China) Beijing (Capital Indoor Stadium)	1000m	(Canada) Danae Blais	(Netherlands) Xandra Velzeboer	(United States) Corinne Stoddard (South Korea) Choi Min-jeong	
3	2	7 December	(China) Beijing (Capital Indoor Stadium)	3000m relay	Canada	South Korea	Kazakhstan	
3	3	8 December	(China) Beijing (Capital Indoor Stadium)	1500m	(United States) Corinne Stoddard	(United States) Kristen Santos-Griswold	(South Korea) Kim Gil-li	
3	4	8 December	(China) Beijing (Capital Indoor Stadium)	500m	(Netherlands) Xandra Velzeboer	(Canada) Florence Brunelle	(Canada) Rikki Doak	
4	1	14 December	(South Korea) Seoul (Mokdong Ice Rink)	1000m	(South Korea) Kim Gil-li	(Canada) Danae Blais	(South Korea) Choi Min-jeong	
4	2	14 December	(South Korea) Seoul (Mokdong Ice Rink)	3000m relay	Canada	Italy	South Korea	
4	3	15 December	(South Korea) Seoul (Mokdong Ice Rink)	1500m	(United States) Kristen Santos-Griswold	(Belgium) Hanne Desmet	(United States) Corinne Stoddard	
4	4	15 December	(South Korea) Seoul (Mokdong Ice Rink)	500m	(United States) Kristen Santos-Griswold	(Canada) Florence Brunelle	(Belgium) Hanne Desmet	
5	1	8 February	(Netherlands) Tilburg (Ireen Wüst Ijsbaan)	1000m	(Belgium) Hanne Desmet	(United States) Corinne Stoddard	(Netherlands) Xandra Velzeboer	
5	2	8 February	(Netherlands) Tilburg (Ireen Wüst Ijsbaan)	3000m relay	Netherlands	Italy	United States	
5	3	9 February	(Netherlands) Tilburg (Ireen Wüst Ijsbaan)	1500m	(Canada) Courtney Sarault	(Italy) Elisa Confortola	(United States) Corinne Stoddard	
5	4	9 February	(Netherlands) Tilburg (Ireen Wüst Ijsbaan)	500m	(Canada) Florence Brunelle	(Netherlands) Michelle Velzeboer	(United States) Kristen Santos-Griswold	
6	1	15 February	(Italy) Milan (Forum di Milano)	1000m	(United States) Kristen Santos-Griswold	(United States) Corinne Stoddard	(Italy) Elisa Confortola	
6	2	15 February	(Italy) Milan (Forum di Milano)	3000m relay	Netherlands	Italy	China	
6	3	16 February	(Italy) Milan (Forum di Milano)	1500m	(Belgium) Hanne Desmet	(United States) Kristen Santos-Griswold	(Italy) Arianna Fontana	
6	4	16 February	(Italy) Milan (Forum di Milano)	500m	(United States) Kristen Santos-Griswold	(Italy) Arianna Fontana	(Netherlands) Xandra Velzeboer	

=== Standings ===
==== Overall ====
Rank	after 24 of 24 events	Points
1	(United States) Kristen Santos-Griswold	1120
2	(Netherlands) Xandra Velzeboer	950
3	(United States) Corinne Stoddard	948
4	(Belgium) Hanne Desmet	918
5	(South Korea) Choi Min-jeong	692

==== 500m ====
Rank	after 6 of 6 events	Points
1	(United States) Kristen Santos-Griswold	410
2	(Netherlands) Xandra Velzeboer	398
3	(Canada) Florence Brunelle	360
4	(Belgium) Hanne Desmet	256
5	(Netherlands) Michelle Velzeboer	242

==== 1000m ====
Rank	after 6 of 6 events	Points
1	(Netherlands) Xandra Velzeboer	374
2	(United States) Corinne Stoddard	370
3	(Canada) Danae Blais	320
4	(South Korea) Choi Min-jeong	300
5	(United States) Kristen Santos-Griswold	268

==== 1500m ====
Rank	after 6 of 6 events	Points
1	(Belgium) Hanne Desmet	404
2	(United States) Kristen Santos-Griswold	380
3	(United States) Corinne Stoddard	360
4	(South Korea) Kim Gil-li	310
5	(Italy) Elisa Confortola	274

==== 3000 m Relay ====
Rank	after 6 of 6 events	Points
1	Italy	420
1	Canada	420
3	Netherlands	366
4	South Korea	340
5	China	286

== Mixed ==
=== Calendar ===
Stage	Date	Place	Winner	Second	Third	R.
1	27 October	(Canada) Montréal (Maurice Richard Arena)	Netherlands	South Korea	Canada	
2	3 November	(Canada) Montréal (Maurice Richard Arena)	Canada	Netherlands	Japan	
3	8 December	(China) Beijing (Capital Indoor Stadium)	China	South Korea	United States	
4	15 December	(South Korea) Seoul (Mokdong Ice Rink)	South Korea	China	Canada	
5	9 February	(Netherlands) Tilburg (Ireen Wüst Ijsbaan)	Netherlands	Italy	United States	
6	16 February	(Italy) Milan (Forum di Milano)	Netherlands	Canada	Japan	

=== Standings ===
Rank	after 6 of 6 events	Points
1	Netherlands	440
2	Canada	370
3	South Korea	322
4	China	304
5	United States	276

== Podium table by nation ==
Table showing the World tour podium places by the countries represented by the athletes.

Rank	Nation	Gold	Silver	Bronze	Total
1	Canada	21	11	5	37
2	Netherlands	13	7	8	28
3	South Korea	5	11	10	26
4	United States	5	6	10	21
5	China	5	2	5	12
6	Belgium	3	3	2	8
7	Italy	2	8	8	18
8	Latvia	0	3	1	4
9	Japan	0	2	2	4
10	Poland	0	1	1	2
11	Kazakhstan	0	0	2	2
12	Great Britain	0	0	1	1
Totals (12 entries)		54	54	55	163
