= 2019–20 ISU Short Track Speed Skating World Cup =

Multi-race tournament

- Dates: 1 November 2019 – 14 February 2020

The 2019–20 ISU Short Track Speed Skating World Cup was a multi-race tournament over a season for short track speed skating. The season began on 1 November 2019 in United States and ended on 14 February 2020 in Netherlands. The World Cup was organised by the ISU who also runs world cups and championships in speed skating and figure skating.

The World Cup consisted of six competitions this year.

== Calendar ==
=== Men ===
==== Salt Lake City 1–3 November 2019 ====
Date	Place	Distance	Winner	Second	Third	Reference
2 November 2019	Utah Olympic Oval	500m (1)	(South Korea) Hwang Dae-heon	(Russia) Victor An	(Hungary) Shaoang Liu	
3 November 2019	Utah Olympic Oval	500m (2)	(China) Wu Dajing	(Hungary) Shaolin Sandor Liu	(Kazakhstan) Abzal Azhgaliyev	
3 November 2019	Utah Olympic Oval	1000m	(South Korea) Hwang Dae-heon	(Russia) Victor An	(South Korea) Park Ji-won	
2 November 2019	Utah Olympic Oval	1500m	(Russia) Semen Elistratov	(South Korea) Kim Dong-wook	(Russia) Aleksandr Shulginov	
3 November 2019	Utah Olympic Oval	5000m relay	Russia	South Korea	Canada	

==== Montreal 8–10 November 2019 ====
Date	Place	Distance	Winner	Second	Third	Reference
10 November 2019	Maurice Richard Arena	500m	(Hungary) Shaolin Sandor Liu	(South Korea) Hwang Dae-heon	(Russia) Pavel Sitnikov	
9 November 2019	Maurice Richard Arena	1000m (1)	(South Korea) Hwang Dae-heon	(Canada) Steven Dubois	(China) Han Tianyu	
10 November 2019	Maurice Richard Arena	1000m (2)	(Russia) Semen Elistratov	(South Korea) Park In-wook	(South Korea) Park Ji-won	
9 November 2019	Maurice Richard Arena	1500m	(South Korea) Park Ji-won	(China) An Kai	(South Korea) Lee June-seo	
10 November 2019	Maurice Richard Arena	5000m relay	Hungary	South Korea	Russia	

==== Nagoya 29 November–1 December 2019 ====
Date	Place	Distance	Winner	Second	Third	Reference
1 December 2019	Nippon Gaishi Arena	500m	(Hungary) Shaoang Liu	(Russia) Pavel Sitnikov	(South Korea) Park In-wook	
30 November 2019	Nippon Gaishi Arena	1000m	(South Korea) Park Ji-won	(Hungary) Shaoang Liu	(Russia) Semen Elistratov	
30 November 2019	Nippon Gaishi Arena	1500m (1)	(South Korea) Kim Dong-wook	(South Korea) Park In-wook	(Japan) Keita Watanabe	
1 December 2019	Nippon Gaishi Arena	1500m (2)	(South Korea) Park Ji-won	(South Korea) Lee June-seo	(Japan) Ibuki Hayashi	
1 December 2019	Nippon Gaishi Arena	5000m relay	China	South Korea	Russia	

==== Shanghai 6–8 December 2019 ====
Date	Place	Distance	Winner	Second	Third	Reference
7 December 2019	Oriental Sports Center	500m (1)	(Hungary) Shaolin Sandor Liu	(China) Wu Dajing	(Hungary) Shaoang Liu	
8 December 2019	Oriental Sports Center	500m (2)	(Hungary) Shaolin Sandor Liu	(South Korea) Lee June-seo	(Canada) Steven Dubois	
8 December 2019	Oriental Sports Center	1000m	(China) Han Tianyu	(Hungary) Shaoang Liu	(South Korea) Park Ji-won	
7 December 2019	Oriental Sports Center	1500m	(South Korea) Lee June-seo	(China) Han Tianyu	(China) An Kai	
8 December 2019	Oriental Sports Center	5000m relay	Russia	Hungary	South Korea	

==== Dresden 7–9 February 2020 ====
Date	Place	Distance	Winner	Second	Third	Reference
8 February 2020	EnergieVerbund Arena	500m	(Canada) Steven Dubois	(Hungary) Shaolin Sandor Liu	(Netherlands) Melle van't Wout	
9 February 2020	EnergieVerbund Arena	1000m	(South Korea) Park Ji-won	(Hungary) Shaolin Sandor Liu	(Japan) Kazuki Yoshinaga	
8 February 2020	EnergieVerbund Arena	1500m (1)	(China) Ren Ziwei	(Netherlands) Sven Roes	(South Korea) Kim Da-gyeom	
9 February 2020	EnergieVerbund Arena	1500m (2)	(South Korea) Park Ji-won	(Russia) Semen Elistratov	(United States) John-Henry Krueger	
9 February 2020	EnergieVerbund Arena	5000m relay	South Korea	Russia	Netherlands	

==== Dordrecht 14–16 February 2020 ====
Date	Place	Distance	Winner	Second	Third	Reference
15 February 2020	Sportboulevard Dordrecht	500m	(South Korea) Lee June-seo	(Belgium) Stijn Desmet	(Kazakhstan) Abzal Azhgaliyev	
15 February 2020	Sportboulevard Dordrecht	1000m (1)	(South Korea) Kim Da-gyeom	(Canada) Cedrik Blais	(Netherlands) Itzhak de Laat	
16 February 2020	Sportboulevard Dordrecht	1000m (2)	(South Korea) Park Ji-won	(South Korea) Kim Dong-wook	(Canada) Steven Dubois	
16 February 2020	Sportboulevard Dordrecht	1500m	(South Korea) Park Ji-won	(South Korea) Lee June-seo	(China) Ren Ziwei	
16 February 2020	Sportboulevard Dordrecht	5000m relay	Canada	Netherlands	China	

=== Women ===
==== Salt Lake City 1–3 November 2019 ====
Date	Place	Distance	Winner	Second	Third	Reference
2 November 2019	Utah Olympic Oval	500m (1)	(Italy) Martina Valcepina	(Netherlands) Yara van Kerkhof	(Hungary) Petra Jaszapati	
3 November 2019	Utah Olympic Oval	500m (2)	(Canada) Kim Boutin	(China) Qu Chunyu	(Netherlands) Lara van Ruijven	
3 November 2019	Utah Olympic Oval	1000m	(Netherlands) Suzanne Schulting	(China) Han Yutong	(China) Zhang Chutong	
2 November 2019	Utah Olympic Oval	1500m	(Canada) Kim Boutin	(Netherlands) Suzanne Schulting	(China) Han Yutong	
3 November 2019	Utah Olympic Oval	3000m relay	China	South Korea	Canada	

==== Montreal 8–10 November 2019 ====
Date	Place	Distance	Winner	Second	Third	Reference
10 November 2019	Maurice Richard Arena	500m	(Canada) Kim Boutin	(Italy) Martina Valcepina	(Poland) Natalia Maliszewska	
9 November 2019	Maurice Richard Arena	1000m (1)	(Canada) Kim Boutin	(South Korea) Seo Whi-min	(China) Fan Kexin	
10 November 2019	Maurice Richard Arena	1000m (2)	(China) Han Yutong	(Canada) Courtney Lee Sarault	(Russia) Ekaterina Efremenkova	
9 November 2019	Maurice Richard Arena	1500m	(South Korea) Kim Ji-yoo	(Italy) Arianna Fontana	(South Korea) Noh Do-hee	
10 November 2019	Maurice Richard Arena	3000m relay	China	Russia	South Korea	

==== Nagoya 29 November–1 December 2019 ====
Date	Place	Distance	Winner	Second	Third	Reference
1 December 2019	Nippon Gaishi Arena	500m	(Canada) Kim Boutin	(Italy) Arianna Fontana	(South Korea) Kim Ji-yoo	
30 November 2019	Nippon Gaishi Arena	1000m	(South Korea) Noh Ah-reum	(Netherlands) Suzanne Schulting	(United States) Kristen Santos	
30 November 2019	Nippon Gaishi Arena	1500m (1)	(South Korea) Kim Ji-yoo	(Canada) Kim Boutin	(Italy) Arianna Fontana	
1 December 2019	Nippon Gaishi Arena	1500m (2)	(Netherlands) Suzanne Schulting	(Canada) Courtney Lee Sarault	(China) Han Yutong	
1 December 2019	Nippon Gaishi Arena	3000m relay	Italy	Canada	Russia	

==== Shanghai 6–8 December 2019 ====
Date	Place	Distance	Winner	Second	Third	Reference
7 December 2019	Oriental Sports Center	500m (1)	(Canada) Kim Boutin	(Netherlands) Suzanne Schulting	(Italy) Martina Valcepina	
8 December 2019	Oriental Sports Center	500m (2)	(China) Fan Kexin	(Netherlands) Yara van Kerkhof	(China) Qu Chunyu	
8 December 2019	Oriental Sports Center	1000m	(Netherlands) Suzanne Schulting	(South Korea) Seo Whi-min	(Canada) Kim Boutin	
7 December 2019	Oriental Sports Center	1500m	(South Korea) Kim A-lang	(South Korea) Choi Min-jeong	(Canada) Courtney Lee Sarault	
8 December 2019	Oriental Sports Center	3000m relay	Canada	Netherlands	United States	

==== Dresden 7–9 February 2020 ====
Date	Place	Distance	Winner	Second	Third	Reference
8 February 2020	EnergieVerbund Arena	500m	(Canada) Kim Boutin	(China) Qu Chunyu	(Netherlands) Lara van Ruijven	
9 February 2020	EnergieVerbund Arena	1000m	(South Korea) Kim Ji-yoo	(Canada) Courtney Lee Sarault	(Netherlands) Suzanne Schulting	
8 February 2020	EnergieVerbund Arena	1500m (1)	(South Korea) Choi Min-jeong	(South Korea) Noh Ah-reum	(China) Han Yutong	
9 February 2020	EnergieVerbund Arena	1500m (2)	(Netherlands) Suzanne Schulting	(Russia) Sofia Prosvirnova	(France) Tifany Huot-Marchand	
9 February 2020	EnergieVerbund Arena	3000m relay	Netherlands	China	Japan	

==== Dordrecht 14–16 February 2020 ====
Date	Place	Distance	Winner	Second	Third	Reference
15 February 2020	Sportboulevard Dordrecht	500m	(Netherlands) Lara van Ruijven	(Netherlands) Yara van Kerkhof	(Poland) Kamila Stormowska	
15 February 2020	Sportboulevard Dordrecht	1000m (1)	(South Korea) Lee Yu-bin	(China) Zhang Chutong	(Poland) Natalia Maliszewska	
16 February 2020	Sportboulevard Dordrecht	1000m (2)	(South Korea) Kim Ji-yoo	(China) Han Yutong	(Russia) Sofia Prosvirnova	
16 February 2020	Sportboulevard Dordrecht	1500m	(Netherlands) Suzanne Schulting	(South Korea) Kim Ji-yoo	(South Korea) Noh Ah-reum	
16 February 2020	Sportboulevard Dordrecht	3000m relay	Netherlands	Canada	South Korea	

=== Mixed ===
==== Salt Lake City 1–3 November 2019 ====
Date	Place	Distance	Winner	Second	Third	Reference
2 November 2019	Utah Olympic Oval	2000m relay	Russia	China	South Korea	

==== Montreal 8–10 November 2019 ====
Date	Place	Distance	Winner	Second	Third	Reference
9 November 2018	Maurice Richard Arena	2000m relay	China	Russia	South Korea	

==== Nagoya 29 November–1 December 2019 ====
Date	Place	Distance	Winner	Second	Third	Reference
30 November 2019	Nippon Gaishi Arena	2000m relay	South Korea	Russia	Netherlands	

==== Shanghai 6–8 December 2019 ====
Date	Place	Distance	Winner	Second	Third	Reference
7 December 2019	Oriental Sports Center	2000m relay	Netherlands	Russia	Japan	

==== Dresden 7–9 February 2020 ====
Date	Place	Distance	Winner	Second	Third	Reference
8 February 2019	EnergieVerbund Arena	2000m relay	Hungary	Russia	France	

==== Dordrecht 14–16 February 2020 ====
Date	Place	Distance	Winner	Second	Third	Reference
8 February 2019	Sportboulevard Dordrecht	2000m relay	China	South Korea	Japan	

== World Cup standings ==
=== Men's 500 metres ===
Standings after 5 events

Pos	Athlete	Points
1.	Shaolin Sandor Liu (HUN)	50096
2.	Wu Dajing (CHN)	32171
3.	Abzal Azhgaliyev (KAZ)	24664
4.	Lee June-seo (KOR)	23774
5.	Pavel Sitnikov (RUS)	23319

=== Women's 500 metres ===
Standings after 5 events

Pos	Athlete	Points
1.	Kim Boutin (CAN)	50000
2.	Martina Valcepina (ITA)	38736
3.	Yara van Kerkhof (NED)	34289
4.	Qu Chunyu (CHN)	34074
5.	Lara van Ruijven (NED)	29248

=== Men's 1000 metres ===
Standings after 5 events

Pos	Athlete	Points
1.	Park Ji-won (KOR)	49200
2.	Han Tianyu (CHN)	29752
3.	Semen Elistratov (RUS)	25451
4.	Hwang Dae-heon (KOR)	21522
5.	Steven Dubois (CAN)	19612

=== Women's 1000 metres ===
Standings after 5 events

Pos	Athlete	Points
1.	Suzanne Schulting (NED)	39355
2.	Han Yutong (CHN)	31120
3.	Seo Whi-min (KOR)	24447
4.	Kim Ji-yoo (KOR)	23227
5.	Sofia Prosvirnova (RUS)	21271

=== Men's 1500 metres ===
Standings after 5 events

Pos	Athlete	Points
1.	Park Ji-won (KOR)	42621
2.	Lee June-seo (KOR)	37642
3.	An Kai (CHN)	27580
4.	Kim Dong-wook (KOR)	27216
5.	Semen Elistratov (RUS)	24815

=== Women's 1500 metres ===
Standings after 5 events

Pos	Athlete	Points
1.	Suzanne Schulting (NED)	38000
2.	Kim Ji-yoo (KOR)	30621
3.	Han Yutong (CHN)	29031
4.	Choi Min-jeong (KOR)	22744
5.	Kim Boutin (CAN)	20621

=== Men's 5000 metre relay ===
Standings after 5 events

Pos	Athlete	Points
1	Russia	34400
2	South Korea	34000
3	China	26640
4	Hungary	25373
5	Netherlands	24640

=== Women's 3000 metre relay ===
Standings after 5 events

Pos	Athlete	Points
1	Netherlands	33120
2	Canada	32420
3	China	31277
4	South Korea	24640
5	Russia	23616

=== Mixed 2000 metre relay ===
Standings after 5 events

Pos	Athlete	Points
1	Russia	34000
2	China	33120
3	South Korea	30800
4	Netherlands	26640
5	Japan	17869

== See also ==
- 2020 World Short Track Speed Skating Championships
- 2020 Four Continents Short Track Speed Skating Championships
- 2020 European Short Track Speed Skating Championships
