= ISU Short Track World Tour =

Short track speed skating competition

ISU Short Track World Tour is a series of international short track speed skating competitions, organised yearly by the International Skating Union since the 2024–2025 short track speed skating season, replacing the world cup. Skaters can earn points at each competition and the skater who has the most points on a given distance at the end of the series is the winner.

== History ==
On the 59th ISU Congress in 2024, it is announced that the Short Track World Tour will replace the World Cup series, with new modern helmet designs and racing suits for each short track team to differentiate the Short Track World Tour season from the Championships. Moreover, to enrich fan experience, event concepts, TV broadcast presentation and digital engagement channels will be upgraded as well.

== Competition format ==
- The world's top ranking athletes are allowed to miss the initial qualifying rounds, with other non-seeded competing towards the quarterfinals (for 1500m event) or heats.
- Each competing team will be represented by an animal which associates with the nation's country, where the animals will be printed on the team's suit and helmet.

== Overall world tour winners ==
=== Men ===
Season	Overall	500 m	1,000 m	1,500 m	5,000 m relay
2024–25	(Canada) William Dandjinou	(Canada) Steven Dubois	(Canada) William Dandjinou	(Canada) William Dandjinou	Canada
2025–26	(Canada) William Dandjinou (2)	(Canada) William Dandjinou	(Italy) Pietro Sighel	(Canada) William Dandjinou (2)	South Korea

=== Women ===
Season	Overall	500 m	1,000 m	1,500 m	3,000 m relay
2024–25	(United States) Kristen Santos-Griswold	(United States) Kristen Santos-Griswold	(Netherlands) Xandra Velzeboer	(Belgium) Hanne Desmet	Italy; Canada
2025–26	(Canada) Courtney Sarault	(Netherlands) Xandra Velzeboer	(Canada) Courtney Sarault	(South Korea) Kim Gil-li	Netherlands

=== Mixed ===
Season	2,000 m relay
2024–25	Netherlands
2025–26	Netherlands (2)

== All-time medal count ==
Updated after 2025–26 ISU Short Track World Tour result.

Rank	Nation	Gold	Silver	Bronze	Total
1	Canada	36	18	14	68
2	Netherlands	21	11	9	41
3	South Korea	14	19	14	47
4	United States	6	12	17	35
5	China	6	8	9	23
6	Belgium	4	3	3	10
7	Italy	3	12	14	29
8	Japan	0	3	4	7
9	Latvia	0	3	1	4
10	Poland	0	1	3	4
11	Kazakhstan	0	0	2	2
12	Great Britain	0	0	1	1
Totals (12 entries)		90	90	91	271
