= Crystal Globe (Short Track Speed Skating) =

- Awarded for: Overall winner of ISU Short Track World Tour
- Presented by: International Skating Union
- First award: 2023
- Website: https://www.isu-skating.com/short-track/events/isu-crystal-globe

The Crystal Globe is an annual award for the overall winner of the ISU Short Track World Tour. The Crystal Globe is awarded in the individual men and women categories since the 2022-23 World Cup. The team award, based on results of individual and team races in the men and women categories and the mixed team event, was created in the 2024-25 season.

== Crystal Globe Winners ==
The first Crystal Globes were awarded in 2023 to South Korean Park Ji-won and Suzanne Schulting from the Netherlands. South Korean skaters Park Ji-won and Kim Gil-li won respectively the men and women categories in 2023-2024. In 2024-25, Kristen Santos-Griswold from the United States and William Dandjinou from Canada were the overall winners of the World Tour. The first team to win the Crystal Globe was Canada. In th 2025-26 season, team Canada and William Dandjinou repeated their success in winning the Crystal Globe. Courtney Sarault won the title in the women´s competition.

Crystal Globe Winners
	Man	Woman	Team
2022-23	(South Korea) Park Ji-won	(Netherlands) Suzanne Schulting	Not awarded
2023-24	(South Korea) Park Ji-won	(South Korea) Kim Gil-li	Not awarded
2024-25	(Canada) William Dandjinou	(United States) Kristen Santos-Griswold	Canada
2025-26	(Canada) William Dandjinou	(Canada) Courtney Sarault	Canada
