= 2020 Four Continents Short Track Speed Skating Championships =

- Venue: Maurice Richard Arena, Montreal, Canada
- Dates: 11–12 January
- Competitors: 53 from 8 nations

Medalist men
1st place, gold medalist(s)		Hwang Dae-heon	South Korea
2nd place, silver medalist(s)		Steven Dubois	Canada
3rd place, bronze medalist(s)		Park Ji-won	South Korea

Medalist women
1st place, gold medalist(s)		Choi Min-jeong	South Korea
2nd place, silver medalist(s)		Seo Whi-min	South Korea
3rd place, bronze medalist(s)		Courtney Sarault	Canada

The 2020 Four Continents Short Track Speed Skating Championships were the inaugural Four Continents Short Track Speed Skating Championships and held from 11 to 12 January 2020 in Montreal, Canada. Skaters from eight countries (Canada, China, Colombia, Japan, the Philippines, Singapore, South Korea, United States) competed, of which South Korea was the most successful team, winning all ten events.

== Medal summary ==
=== Medal table ===
* Host nation (Canada)

Rank	Nation	Gold	Silver	Bronze	Total
1	South Korea (KOR)	10	2	4	16
2	Canada (CAN)*	0	8	2	10
3	United States (USA)	0	0	3	3
4	China (CHN)	0	0	1	1
Totals (4 entries)		10	10	10	30

=== Men's events ===
Event	Gold		Silver		Bronze	
500 metres	Hwang Dae-heon; South Korea	40.695	Steven Dubois; Canada	40.799	Kim Da-gyeom; South Korea	40.923
1000 metres	Hwang Dae-heon; South Korea	1:27.719	Steven Dubois; Canada	1:27.897	Park Ji-won; South Korea	1:28.033
1500 metres	Hwang Dae-heon; South Korea	2:21.140	Steven Dubois; Canada	2:21.475	Thomas Hong; United States	2:21.627
5000 metre relay	South Korea; Hwang Dae-heon; Lee June-seo; Park Ji-won; Kim Da-gyeom	6:58.666	Canada; Steven Dubois; Charles Hamelin; Pascal Dion; Cédrik Blais	6:58.892	United States; Aaron Tran; Thomas Hong; Andrew Heo; Ryan Pivirotto	6:59.891
Overall Classification	Hwang Dae-heon South Korea	103 pts	Steven Dubois Canada	65 pts	Park Ji-won South Korea	47 pts

=== Women's events ===
Event	Gold		Silver		Bronze	
500 metres	Choi Min-jeong; South Korea	43.684	Alyson Charles; Canada	43.787	Courtney Sarault; Canada	44.007
1000 metres	Choi Min-jeong; South Korea	1:32.712	Courtney Sarault; Canada	1:33.014	Kim A-lang; South Korea	1:33.108
1500 metres	Choi Min-jeong; South Korea	2:41.270	Seo Whi-min; South Korea	2:41.367	Maame Biney; United States	2:41.417
3000 metre relay	South Korea; Choi Min-jeong; Kim Ji-yoo; Noh Ah-reum; Kim A-lang	4:11.404	Canada; Courtney Sarault; Alyson Charles; Claudia Gagnon; Danaé Blais	4:12.028	China; Li Xuan; Guo Yihan; Song Yang; Xu Aili	4:12.239
Overall Classification	Choi Min-jeong South Korea	136 pts	Seo Whi-min South Korea	47 pts	Courtney Sarault Canada	44 pts
