= Andrew Heo =

American speed skater (born 2001)

Personal information
- Born: March 7, 2001 (age 25) Warrington Township, Pennsylvania, U.S.
- Height: 5 ft 7 in (170 cm)

Sport
- Country: United States
- Sport: Short track speed skating
Medal record
Men's short-track speed skating
Representing the United States
World Short Track Championships
Bronze medal – third place	2024 Rotterdam	2000 m mixed relay
Four Continents Championships
Gold medal – first place	2023 Salt Lake City	2000 m mixed relay
Silver medal – second place	2023 Salt Lake City	500 m
Silver medal – second place	2024 Laval	2000 m mixed relay
Bronze medal – third place	2020 Montreal	5000 m relay
Bronze medal – third place	2024 Laval	500 m

Andrew Heo (/ˈændruː ˈhiːoʊ/; born March 7, 2001) is an American short track speed skater. He represented the United States at the 2022 Winter Olympics and 2026 Winter Olympics.

Heo is of South Korean descent. His Korean name is Heo Jae-yeong (Korean: 허재영).

== Career ==
Heo won a bronze medal at the 2020 Four Continents Short Track Speed Skating Championships in the 5000 metre relay.

Heo represented the United States at the 2022 Winter Olympics in the men's 1000 metres.

Heo won a gold medal in 2000 metres mixed relay and silver medal in 500 metres at the 2023 Four Continents Short Track Speed Skating Championships. In 2024, he competed at the 2024 World Short Track Speed Skating Championships and won bronze medal in 2000 metres mixed relay.

During the 2025–26 ISU Short Track World Tour, he won a gold medal in the 500 metres, his first-ever podium finish on the circuit. He became the first U.S. man to win a top-level individual race in 11 years. On December 13, 2025, he was named to team USA's roster for the 2026 Winter Olympics.

== Personal life ==
Heo's older brother, Aaron, is a short track speed skater and represented the United States at the 2016 Winter Youth Olympics.

== World Tour medal record ==
Season	Location	500 meter
2025–2026	(Netherlands) Dordrecht	1st place, gold medalist(s)

Season	Location	Mixed relay
2024–2025	(China) Beijing	3rd place, bronze medalist(s)
2024–2025	(Netherlands) Tilburg	3rd place, bronze medalist(s)
2025–2026	(Netherlands) Dordrecht	2nd place, silver medalist(s)
