= Marcus Howard (speed skater) =

American short track speed skater

Personal information
- Born: October 22, 2003 (age 22) Federal Way, Washington, U.S.
- Height: 5 ft 8 in (173 cm)

Sport
- Country: United States
- Sport: Short track speed skating
Medal record
Men's short-track speed skating
Representing the United States
World Short Track Championships
Bronze medal – third place	2024 Rotterdam	2000 m mixed relay
Four Continents Championships
Gold medal – first place	2023 Salt Lake City	2000 m mixed relay
World Junior Championships
Silver medal – second place	2023 Dresden	500 m
Bronze medal – third place	2023 Dresden	3000 m relay

Marcus Howard (born October 22, 2003) is an American short track speed skater.

== Career ==
At the junior level, Howard competed at the 2023 World Junior Short Track Speed Skating Championships, won the silver medal in 500 metre and bronze medal in 3000 metre relay.

At the senior level in 2023, Howard competed at the 2023 Four Continents Short Track Speed Skating Championships and won gold medal in 2000 metre mixed relay. In 2024, he competed at the 2024 World Short Track Speed Skating Championships and won bronze medal in 2000 metre mixed relay.

== World Tour medal record ==
Season	Location	Mixed relay
2024–2025	(China) Beijing	3rd place, bronze medalist(s)
2024–2025	(Netherlands) Tilburg	3rd place, bronze medalist(s)
2025–2026	(Netherlands) Dordrecht	2nd place, silver medalist(s)
