= Daan Kos =

Dutch short track speed skater

Personal information
- Nationality: Netherlands
- Born: February 4, 2003 (age 23)

Sport
- Sport: Short track speed skating
- Club: RTC Noord Shorttrack
Medal record
Men's short-track speed skating
Representing the Netherlands
Winter Universiade
Bronze medal – third place	2023 Lake Placid	5000 m relay
World Tour
Bronze medal – third place	2025 Tilburg	1000m

Daan Kos (born 2003) is a Dutch short track speed skater. He won a bronze medal in the 1000 meter event at the 5th stage of the 2024-25 World Tour.

== Career ==
Kos is member of the Dutch short track team since 2023. With the Dutch relay team he won a bronze medal at the 2023 Winter World University Games in Lake Placid. Kos won his first international prize at the senior level in Tilburg in February 2025, at the 5th stage of the 2024-25 ISU Short Track World Tour.
