= 2020–21 ISU Short Track Speed Skating World Cup =

Multi-race tournament

- Dates: 6 November 2020 – 28 February 2021

The 2020–21 ISU Short Track Speed Skating World Cup was planned to be a multi-race tournament over a season for short track speed skating. Due to the COVID-19 pandemic, the ISU did not manage to organize the competitions.

On 7 August 2020, the International Skating Union announced the calendar for the 2020-21 season. On 31 August 2020, it was announced that the first two stages in Canada were cancelled. On 30 September 2020, the World Cup stage in Seoul was cancelled as well, and the stage in Beijing which had previously been planned as an Olympic Test event was postponed. The 2021 Four Continents Championships in Salt Lake City was cancelled on 16 October 2020. The last two World Cup events were cancelled on 27 November 2020 due to the German Ice Skating Union being unable to organize the competition amid the pandemic. The Olympic Test Event was rescheduled for 21-24 October 2021.

== Calendar ==
Stage	Location	Date
1	(Canada) Montreal	6–8 November
2	(Canada) Laval	13–15 November
3	(South Korea) Seoul	11–13 December
4	(China) Beijing	18–20 December
5	(Germany) Bietigheim-Bissingen	19–21 February
6	(Germany) Dresden	26–28 February

== See also ==
- 2021 World Short Track Speed Skating Championships
- 2021 European Short Track Speed Skating Championships
