= Corinne Stoddard =

American speed skater (born 2001)

Personal information
- Nickname: Corie
- Born: August 15, 2001 (age 24) Seattle, Washington, U.S.

Sport
- Country: United States
- Sport: Short track speed skating
Medal record
Women's short-track speed skating
Representing the United States
Olympic Games
| Bronze medal – third place | 2026 Milano Cortina | 1500 m |
World Championships
| Silver medal – second place | 2024 Rotterdam | 3000 m relay |
| Bronze medal – third place | 2024 Rotterdam | 1500 m |
| Bronze medal – third place | 2024 Rotterdam | 2000 m mixed relay |
| Bronze medal – third place | 2026 Montreal | 1500 m |
Four Continents Championships
| Gold medal – first place | 2023 Salt Lake City | 2000 m mixed relay |
| Bronze medal – third place | 2023 Salt Lake City | 3000 m relay |
Winter World University Games
| Bronze medal – third place | 2023 Lake Placid | 3000 m relay |
World Junior Championships
| Silver medal – second place | 2020 Bormio | 1000 m |
| Bronze medal – third place | 2020 Bormio | 500 m |

Corinne Stoddard (born August 15, 2001) is an American short track speed skater. She represented the United States at the 2022 and 2026 Winter Olympics, where she won a bronze medal in the 1500 m. She is a three-time World Championships medalist, two-time Four Continents medalist, and two-time World Junior Championships medalist.

== Career ==
Stoddard competed at the 2019 Inline World Junior Championship, winning a gold medal in the 10K elimination race. During the 2019–20 season, she won a bronze medal with the relay team in Shanghai, along with Maame Biney, Kristen Santos and Julie Letai. This was the United States' first World Cup medal in the event in eight years.

She competed at the 2020 World Junior Short Track Speed Skating Championships, where she won a silver medal in the 1000 metres and a bronze medal in the 500 metres.

She represented the United States at the 2022 Winter Olympics. She suffered a broken nose during the 500 metres event.

In 2023, Stoddard competed at the 2023 Four Continents Short Track Speed Skating Championships and won gold medal in 2000 metres mixed relay & bronze medal in 3000 metres relay.

In 2024, she competed at the 2024 World Short Track Speed Skating Championships and won three medals, a silver medal in 3000 metres relay and bronze medal in the 1500 metres & 2000 metres mixed relay. Stoddard and Kristen Santos-Griswold became the first Americans to win a medal at the World Short Track Speed Skating Championships since J. R. Celski in 2014 and the first American women to do so since Lana Gehring in 2012.

During the 2025–26 ISU Short Track World Tour, she won eight individual medals (3 silver, 5 bronze) and finished the season ranked second overall. On December 13, 2025, she was named to Team USA's roster for the 2026 Winter Olympics.

== World Tour medal record ==
| Season | Location | 500 meter |
|---|---|---|
| 2025–2026 | (Canada) Montreal | 3rd place, bronze medalist(s) |
| 2025–2026 | (Poland) Gdańsk | 2nd place, silver medalist(s) |
| 2025–2026 | (Netherlands) Dordrecht | 2nd place, silver medalist(s) |

| Season | Location | 1000 meter |
|---|---|---|
| 2024–2025 | (Canada) Montreal | 3rd place, bronze medalist(s) |
| 2024–2025 | (Canada) Montreal | 3rd place, bronze medalist(s) |
| 2024–2025 | (China) Beijing | 3rd place, bronze medalist(s) |
| 2024–2025 | (Netherlands) Tilburg | 2nd place, silver medalist(s) |
| 2024–2025 | (Italy) Milan | 2nd place, silver medalist(s) |
| 2025–2026 | (Canada) Montreal | 3rd place, bronze medalist(s) |
| 2025–2026 | (Poland) Gdańsk | 3rd place, bronze medalist(s) |
| 2025–2026 | (Netherlands) Dordrecht | 2nd place, silver medalist(s) |

| Season | Location | 1500 meter |
|---|---|---|
| 2024–2025 | (Canada) Montreal | 3rd place, bronze medalist(s) |
| 2024–2025 | (China) Beijing | 1st place, gold medalist(s) |
| 2024–2025 | (South Korea) Seoul | 3rd place, bronze medalist(s) |
| 2024–2025 | (Netherlands) Tilburg | 3rd place, bronze medalist(s) |
| 2025–2026 | (Canada) Montreal | 3rd place, bronze medalist(s) |
| 2025–2026 | (Canada) Montreal | 2nd place, silver medalist(s) |

| Season | Location | 3000m relay |
|---|---|---|
| 2024–2025 | (Netherlands) Tilburg | 3rd place, bronze medalist(s) |
| 2025–2026 | (Poland) Gdańsk | 2nd place, silver medalist(s) |
| 2025–2026 | (Netherlands) Dordrecht | 3rd place, bronze medalist(s) |

| Season | Location | Mixed relay |
|---|---|---|
| 2024–2025 | (China) Beijing | 3rd place, bronze medalist(s) |
| 2024–2025 | (Netherlands) Tilburg | 3rd place, bronze medalist(s) |
| 2025–2026 | (Netherlands) Dordrecht | 2nd place, silver medalist(s) |

== Personal life ==
Stoddard is from Federal Way, Washington.
