= ISU Short Track Speed Skating World Cup =

Annual series of speed-skating races

The Short Track Speed Skating World Cup was a series of international short track speed skating competitions, organised yearly by the International Skating Union since the winter of 1998/1999. Every year during the winter, a number of competitions on a number of different distances are held. Skaters can earn points at each competition and the skater who has the most points on a given distance at the end of the series is the winner.

The ISU Short Track Speed Skating World Cup was replaced by ISU Short Track World Tour starting since the 2024-25 season.

== Overall World Cup winners ==
=== Men ===
Season	Overall	500 m	1,000 m	1,500 m	5,000 m relay	Nations
1998–99	(China) Li Jiajun	(Italy) Fabio Carta	(South Korea) Kim Dong-Sung	(South Korea) Kim Dong-Sung	Italy	Italy
1999–00	(South Korea) Kim Dong-Sung	(China) Li Jiajun	(South Korea) Kim Dong-Sung	(China) Li Jiajun	South Korea	South Korea
2000–01	(United States) Apolo Anton Ohno	(United States) Apolo Anton Ohno	(United States) Apolo Anton Ohno	(United States) Apolo Anton Ohno	Canada	Canada
2001–02	(South Korea) Kim Dong-Sung (2)	(South Korea) Kim Dong-Sung	(South Korea) Kim Dong-Sung (3)	(South Korea) Kim Dong-Sung (2)	South Korea	South Korea
2002–03	(United States) Apolo Anton Ohno	(Canada) Jean-François Monette	(United States) Apolo Anton Ohno	(Italy) Fabio Carta	Canada	Canada
2003–04	(South Korea) Ahn Hyun-soo	(China) Li Jiajun (2)	(South Korea) Ahn Hyun-soo	(South Korea) Ahn Hyun-soo	China	China
2004–05	(United States) Apolo Anton Ohno (3)	(Canada) Mathieu Turcotte	(United States) Apolo Anton Ohno (3)	(United States) Apolo Anton Ohno (2)	Canada	Canada
2005–06	(South Korea) Ahn Hyun-soo (2)	(South Korea) Ahn Hyun-soo	(South Korea) Lee Ho-suk	(South Korea) Ahn Hyun-soo (2)	South Korea	South Korea
2006–07	(Germany) Tyson Heung	(Germany) Tyson Heung	(South Korea) Lee Ho-suk (2)	(South Korea) Kim Hyun-Kon	Italy (2)	South Korea
2007–08	(South Korea) Lee Ho-suk	(South Korea) Sung Si-Bak	(South Korea) Ahn Hyun-soo (2)	(South Korea) Lee Ho-Suk	South Korea	South Korea
2008–09	(South Korea) Sung Si-Bak	(Canada) François-Louis Tremblay	(South Korea) Lee Ho-Suk (3)	(South Korea) Sung Si-Bak	Canada	South Korea
2009–10	(South Korea) Lee Jung-su	(Canada) Charles Hamelin	(South Korea) Lee Jung-Su	(South Korea) Lee Jung-Su	South Korea	South Korea
2010–11*	~~(France) Thibaut Fauconnet~~	(United States) Simon Cho	~~(France) Thibaut Fauconnet~~	(France) Maxime Chataignier	Canada	Canada
2011–12	(South Korea) Noh Jin-Kyu	(Canada) Olivier Jean	(South Korea) Kwak Yoon-Gy	(South Korea) Noh Jin-Kyu	Canada	South Korea
2012–13	(South Korea) Noh Jin-Kyu (2)	(Canada) Charles Hamelin (2)	(South Korea) Kwak Yoon-Gy (2)	(South Korea) Noh Jin-Kyu (2)	South Korea (6)	South Korea
2013–14	(Canada) Charles Hamelin	(Russia) Victor An (2)	(Canada) Charles Hamelin	(South Korea) Lee Han-bin	United States	Canada
2014–15	(South Korea) Sin Da-woon	(Russia) Dmitry Migunov	(Russia) Semion Elistratov	(South Korea) Sin Da-woon	Netherlands	South Korea
2015–16	(South Korea) Kwak Yoon-Gy	(Russia) Dmitry Migunov (2)	(Russia) Semion Elistratov (2)	(South Korea) Kwak Yoon-gy	Canada	Canada (6)
2016–17	(Hungary) Shaoang Liu	(China) Wu Dajing	(Hungary) Shaoang Liu	(Netherlands) Sjinkie Knegt	Netherlands (2)	South Korea
2017–18	(South Korea) Hwang Dae-heon	(China) Wu Dajing (2)	(Hungary) Shaolin Sándor Liu	(South Korea) Hwang Dae-heon	Canada	South Korea
2018–19	(South Korea) Lim Hyo-jun	(South Korea) Lim Hyo-jun	(South Korea) Park Ji-won	(South Korea) Kim Gun-woo	Hungary	South Korea
2019–20	(South Korea) Park Ji-won	(Hungary) Shaolin Sándor Liu	(South Korea) Park Ji-won	(South Korea) Park Ji-won	Russia	South Korea
2020–21	Cancelled					
2021–22		(Hungary) Shaolin Sándor Liu (2)	(Canada) Pascal Dion	(China) Ren Ziwei	Canada	
2022–23	(South Korea) Park Ji-won	(Kazakhstan) Denis Nikisha	(South Korea) Park Ji-won	(South Korea) Park Ji-won (2)	Canada	South Korea
2023–24	(South Korea) Park Ji-won (3)	(Canada) Jordan Pierre-Gilles	(South Korea) Park Ji-won (4)	(Canada) William Dandjinou	Canada (11)	South Korea (16)

*no results available
*Thibaut Fauconnet was disqualified after failing doping tests.

- Medals:
- World Cup Results - Country Medal Table

Rank	Nation	Gold	Silver	Bronze	Total
1	South Korea	326	232	167	725
2	Canada	142	162	170	474
3	China	105	108	104	317
4	United States	75	64	88	227
5	Russia	31	39	39	109
6	Italy	24	36	48	108
7	Hungary	23	28	22	73
8	Netherlands	14	34	31	79
9	Japan	9	28	38	75
10	France	3	7	13	23
Totals (10 entries)		752	738	720	2,210

=== Women ===
Season	Overall	500 m	1,000 m	1,500 m	3,000 m relay	Nations
1998–99	(China) Yang Yang (A)	(China) Wang Chunlu	(China) Yang Yang (S)	(China) Yang Yang (A)	China	China
1999–00	(China) Yang Yang (A)	(China) Yang Yang (S)	(China) Yang Yang (A)	(China) Yang Yang (A)	China	China
2000–01	(China) Yang Yang (A)	(Bulgaria) Evgenia Radanova	(China) Yang Yang (A)	(China) Yang Yang (A)	China	China
2001–02	(China) Yang Yang (A) (4)	(China) Yang Yang (S) (2)	(China) Yang Yang (A) (3)	(China) Yang Yang (A) (4)	South Korea	China
2002–03	(China) Fu Tianyu	(Canada) Amélie Goulet-Nadon	(Canada) Amélie Goulet-Nadon	(Canada) Amélie Goulet-Nadon	China	China
2003–04	(South Korea) Choi Eun-Kyung	(China) Fu Tianyu	(South Korea) Choi Eun-Kyung	(South Korea) Choi Eun-Kyung	South Korea	South Korea
2004–05	(China) Wang Meng	(China) Wang Meng	(South Korea) Choi Eun-Kyung (2)	(South Korea) Jin Sun-Yu	China	China
2005–06	(South Korea) Jin Sun-Yu	(China) Wang Meng	(China) Wang Meng	(South Korea) Jin Sun-Yu	South Korea	South Korea
2006–07	(South Korea) Byun Chun-Sa	(China) Wang Meng	(South Korea) Byun Chun-Sa	(South Korea) Jung Eun-Ju	Italy	China
2007–08	(South Korea) Jin Sun-Yu (2)	(China) Wang Meng	(South Korea) Jin Sun-Yu	(South Korea) Jin Sun-Yu (3)	China	China
2008–09	(China) Wang Meng	(China) Wang Meng	(China) Wang Meng	(China) Zhou Yang	China	China
2009–10	(China) Wang Meng (3)	(China) Wang Meng	(China) Wang Meng (3)	(China) Zhou Yang (2)	China	China
2010–11	(United States) Katherine Reutter	(Canada) Marianne St-Gelais	(United States) Katherine Reutter	(United States) Katherine Reutter	China	China
2011–12	(Italy) Arianna Fontana	(Italy) Arianna Fontana	(Japan) Yui Sakai	(South Korea) Cho Ha-Ri	China	China (12)
2012–13	(South Korea) Shim Suk Hee	(China) Wang Meng	(United Kingdom) Elise Christie	(South Korea) Shim Suk Hee	China (11)	South Korea
2013–14	(South Korea) Shim Suk Hee	(China) Wang Meng (8)	(South Korea) Shim Suk Hee	(South Korea) Shim Suk Hee	South Korea	South Korea
2014–15	(South Korea) Shim Suk Hee (3)	(China) Fan Kexin	(South Korea) Shim Suk Hee (2)	(South Korea) Choi Min-jeong	South Korea	South Korea
2015–16	(South Korea) Choi Min-jeong	(Canada) Marianne St-Gelais	(South Korea) Choi Min-jeong	(South Korea) Choi Min-jeong	South Korea	South Korea
2016–17	(Netherlands) Suzanne Schulting	(Canada) Marianne St-Gelais (3)	(Netherlands) Suzanne Schulting	(South Korea) Shim Suk Hee (3)	South Korea	South Korea
2017–18	(South Korea) Choi Min-jeong (2)	(South Korea) Choi Min-jeong	(South Korea) Choi Min-jeong (2)	(South Korea) Choi Min-jeong (3)	South Korea (8)	South Korea
2018–19	(Netherlands) Suzanne Schulting	(Poland) Natalia Maliszewska	(Netherlands) Suzanne Schulting	(Netherlands) Suzanne Schulting	Russia	Netherlands
2019–20	(Netherlands) Suzanne Schulting	(Canada) Kim Boutin	(Netherlands) Suzanne Schulting	(Netherlands) Suzanne Schulting (2)	Netherlands	Netherlands
2020–21	Cancelled					
2021–22		(Italy) Arianna Fontana (2)	(Netherlands) Suzanne Schulting	(South Korea) Lee Yu-bin	Netherlands	
2022–23	(Netherlands) Suzanne Schulting (4)	(Netherlands) Xandra Velzeboer	(Netherlands) Suzanne Schulting (5)	(South Korea) Kim Gil-li	Canada	Netherlands (3)
2023–24	(South Korea) Kim Gil-li	(Netherlands) Xandra Velzeboer (2)	(United States) Kristen Santos-Griswold	(South Korea) Kim Gil-li (2)	Netherlands (3)	South Korea (9)

*no results available

- Medals:
- World Cup Results - Country Medal Table

Rank	Nation	Gold	Silver	Bronze	Total
1	South Korea	285	243	169	697
2	China	280	209	158	647
3	Canada	63	110	147	320
4	Netherlands	30	27	28	85
5	Italy	23	50	59	132
6	United States	22	31	51	104
7	Bulgaria	21	34	44	99
8	Great Britain	13	12	13	38
9	Russia	5	16	21	42
10	Japan	3	9	32	44
Totals (10 entries)		745	741	722	2,208

=== Mixed ===
Season	2,000 m relay
2018–19	Russia
2019–20	Russia (2)
2020–21	Cancelled
2021–22	China
2022-23	South Korea
2023-24	Netherlands

- Medals:

Rank	Nation	Gold	Silver	Bronze	Total
1	China	5	2	2	9
2	Russia	4	4	0	8
3	Netherlands	2	3	1	6
4	Hungary	2	2	1	5
5	South Korea	1	2	4	7
6	Canada	1	2	0	3
7	France	0	0	3	3
8	Great Britain	0	0	1	1
8	Japan	0	0	1	1
8	United States	0	0	1	1
Totals (10 entries)		15	15	14	44

== All-time medal count ==
The all-time medal count is updated as at 2023-24 season, the finale edition of the world cup.

Rank	Nation	Gold	Silver	Bronze	Total
1	South Korea	666	528	383	1,577
2	China	406	334	284	1,024
3	Canada	257	312	351	920
4	United States	108	114	168	390
5	Netherlands	106	92	82	280
6	Italy	49	91	120	260
7	Russia	40	59	60	159
8	Hungary	27	33	31	91
9	Bulgaria	21	34	44	99
10	Great Britain	15	19	23	57
11	Japan	12	39	80	131
12	Belgium	11	23	6	40
13	France	5	9	23	37
13	Poland	5	9	23	37
15	Kazakhstan	4	14	18	36
16	Germany	2	10	15	27
17	Latvia	2	2	11	15
18	Australia	2	0	3	5
19	Israel	1	2	2	5
20	New Zealand	1	0	0	1
21	Austria	0	2	0	2
22	Czech Republic	0	0	1	1
22	Lithuania	0	0	1	1
Totals (23 entries)		1,740	1,726	1,729	5,195

== Crystal Globe Awardees ==
Season	Men	Women
2022-23	(South Korea) Park Ji-won	(Netherlands) Suzanne Schulting
2023-24	(South Korea) Park Ji-won	(South Korea) Kim Gil-li

=== Medal count ===
Rank	Nation	Gold	Silver	Bronze	Total
1	South Korea	3	0	0	3
2	Canada	1	0	0	1
2	Netherlands	1	0	0	1
2	United States	1	0	0	1
Totals (4 entries)		6	0	0	6

== See also ==
- Short track speed skating
- World Short Track Speed Skating Championships
- World Cup Ranking statistics
