= 2018 World Junior Short Track Speed Skating Championships =

Sports competition

- Location: Tomaszów Mazowiecki, Poland
- Venue: Ice Arena Tomaszów Mazowiecki
- Dates: 2–4 March
- Competitors: 181 from 38 nations

Medalist men
1st place, gold medalist(s)		Hong Kyung-hwan	South Korea
2nd place, silver medalist(s)		Lee June-seo	South Korea
3rd place, bronze medalist(s)		Park Jang-hyuk	South Korea

Medalist women
1st place, gold medalist(s)		Kim Ji-yoo	South Korea
2nd place, silver medalist(s)		Courtney Lee Sarault	Canada
3rd place, bronze medalist(s)		Maame Biney	United States

The 2018 World Junior Short Track Speed Skating Championships took place from 2 to 4 March 2018 in Tomaszów Mazowiecki, Poland.

== Medal summary ==
=== Medal table ===
Rank	Nation	Gold	Silver	Bronze	Total
1	South Korea	7	3	4	14
2	Canada	1	3	0	4
3	Japan	1	2	0	3
4	United States	1	0	2	3
5	Hungary	0	1	0	1
5	Russia	0	1	0	1
7	Netherlands	0	0	2	2
8	France	0	0	1	1
8	Italy	0	0	1	1
Totals (9 entries)		10	10	10	30

=== Men's events ===
The results of the Championships:

Event	Gold		Silver		Bronze	
500 metres	Lee June-seo (KOR)	41.659	Hong Kyung-hwan (KOR)	41.837	Quentin Fercoq (FRA)	42.206
1000 metres	Hong Kyung-hwan (KOR)	1:30.743	Park Jang-hyuk (KOR)	1:30.839	Lee June-seo (KOR)	1:30.898
1500 metres	Hong Kyung-hwan (KOR)	2:32.908	Kazuki Yoshinaga (JPN)	2:33.017	Park Jang-hyuk (KOR)	2:33.020
3000 metre relay	Japan; Kazuki Yoshinaga; Katsunori Koike; Ryota Inoue; Shuta Matsuzu	4:01.417	Russia; Pavel Sitnikov; Sergey Milovanov; Konstantin Ivliev; Vladimir Moskvitsev	4:01.625	Netherlands; Jasper Brunsmann; Friso Emons; Bram Steenaart; Hugo Bosma	4:15.319
Overall Classification	Hong Kyung-hwan (KOR)	102 pts.	Lee June-seo (KOR)	83 pts.	Park Jang-hyuk (KOR)	55 pts.

=== Women's events ===
The results of the Championships:

Event	Gold		Silver		Bronze	
500 metres	Maame Biney (USA)	44.305	Petra Jászapáti (HUN)	44.359	Xandra Velzeboer (NED)	44.544
1000 metres	Kim Ji-yoo (KOR)	1:34.251	Courtney Lee Sarault (CAN)	1:34.301	Maame Biney (USA)	1:34.592
1500 metres	Kim Ji-yoo (KOR)	2:46.542	Courtney Lee Sarault (CAN)	2:46.667	Han Soo-lim (KOR)	2:46.768
3000 metre relay	Canada; Alyson Charles; Danaé Blais; Courtney Sarault; Claudia Gagnon	4:17.775	Japan; Shione Kaminaga; Aoi Watanabe; Seina Yokoyama; Rina Yamana	4:18.275	Italy; Gloria Confortola; Gloria Ioriatti; Ilaria Cotza; Elisa Confortola	4:25.775
Overall Classification	Kim Ji-yoo (KOR)	94 pts.	Courtney Lee Sarault (CAN)	84 pts.	Maame Biney (USA)	52 pts.

== Participating nations ==
- Australia (5)
- Austria (3)
- Belarus (8)
- Belgium (4)
- Bosnia and Herzegovina (1)
- Bulgaria (4)
- Canada (8)
- Chinese Taipei (6)
- Croatia (3)
- Czech Republic (6)
- France (7)
- Germany (6)
- Great Britain (3)
- Hong Kong (1)
- Hungary (8)
- Italy (8)
- Japan (8)
- Kazakhstan (8)
- Latvia (3)
- Lithuania (1)
- Luxembourg (1)
- Malaysia (7)
- Netherlands (8)
- New Zealand (2)
- Philippines (1)
- Poland (8)
- Qatar (1)
- Russia (5)
- Serbia (5)
- Singapore (4)
- Slovakia (4)
- Slovenia (2)
- South Korea (8)
- Sweden (1)
- Thailand (3)
- Turkey (5)
- Ukraine (8)
- United States (8)

== See also ==
- Short track speed skating
- World Junior Short Track Speed Skating Championships
