= 2024 World Short Track Speed Skating Championships =

Speed skating event in the Netherlands

- Venue: Rotterdam Ahoy
- Location: Rotterdam, Netherlands
- Dates: 15–17 March
- Nations: 36

The 2024 World Short Track Speed Skating Championships were held from 15 to 17 March 2024 at the Rotterdam Ahoy in Rotterdam, Netherlands. A total of 36 nations competed.

== Schedule ==
All times are local (UTC+1).

Date	Time	Event
15 March	12:00	Qualifying
16 March	14:23	1500 m women
16 March	14:23	1500 m men
16 March	15:47	500 m women
16 March	15:47	500 m men
17 March	15:22	1000 m women
17 March	15:22	1000 m men
17 March	16:04	2000 m mixed relay
17 March	16:37	3000 m relay women
17 March	16:37	5000 m relay men

== Medal summary ==
=== Medal table ===
* Host nation (Netherlands)

Rank	Nation	Gold	Silver	Bronze	Total
1	China	4	0	0	4
2	Canada	2	0	2	4
3	United States	1	2	3	6
4	Netherlands*	1	2	0	3
4	South Korea	1	2	0	3
6	Italy	0	2	2	4
7	Kazakhstan	0	1	0	1
8	Australia	0	0	1	1
8	Poland	0	0	1	1
Totals (9 entries)		9	9	9	27

=== Men ===
Event	Gold		Silver		Bronze	
500 m	Lin Xiaojun; China	41.592	Denis Nikisha; Kazakhstan	41.676	Jordan Pierre-Gilles; Canada	52.289
1000 m	William Dandjinou; Canada	1:25.534	Pietro Sighel; Italy	1:25.555	Luca Spechenhauser; Italy	1:26.026
1500 m	Sun Long; China	2:23.009	Jens van 't Wout; Netherlands	2:23.260	Brendan Corey; Australia	2:23.428
5000 m relay	China; Lin Xiaojun; Liu Shaoang; Liu Shaolin; Sun Long; Li Wenlong	7:18.468	South Korea; Hwang Dae-heon; Kim Gun-woo; Lee Jeong-min; Seo Yi-ra; Park Ji-won	7:18.641	Poland; Łukasz Kuczyński; Michał Niewiński; Félix Pigeon; Diané Sellier	7:19.103

=== Women ===
Event	Gold		Silver		Bronze	
500 m	Kim Boutin; Canada	42.626	Xandra Velzeboer; Netherlands	42.833	Kristen Santos-Griswold; United States	42.929
1000 m	Kristen Santos-Griswold; United States	1:42.717	Kim Gil-li; South Korea	1:43.049	Arianna Fontana; Italy	1:43.074
1500 m	Kim Gil-li; South Korea	2:21.192	Kristen Santos-Griswold; United States	2:21.413	Corinne Stoddard; United States	2:22.244
3000 m relay	Netherlands; Selma Poutsma; Yara van Kerkhof; Michelle Velzeboer; Xandra Velzeboer; Suzanne Schulting	4:07.788	United States; Eunice Lee; Julie Letai; Kristen Santos-Griswold; Corinne Stoddard	4:08.061	Canada; Danaé Blais; Kim Boutin; Rikki Doak; Renée Steenge; Courtney Sarault	4:12.675

=== Mixed ===
Event	Gold		Silver		Bronze	
2000 m relay	China; Fan Kexin; Gong Li; Lin Xiaojun; Liu Shaoang; Sun Long; Wang Ye	2:37.697	Italy; Chiara Betti; Andrea Cassinelli; Arianna Sighel; Pietro Sighel; Gloria Ioriatti	2:37.747	United States; Andrew Heo; Marcus Howard; Kristen Santos-Griswold; Corinne Stoddard	2:39.369

== Participating nations ==
A total of 36 nations competed.

- Australia
- Austria
- Belgium
- Bosnia and Herzegovina
- Bulgaria
- Canada
- China
- Croatia
- Czech Republic
- France
- Great Britain
- Germany
- Hong Kong
- Hungary
- India
- Ireland
- Italy
- Japan
- Kazakhstan
- Korea Republic
- Latvia
- Luxembourg
- Mongolia
- Netherlands
- Norway
- New Zealand
- Poland
- Serbia
- Singapore
- Slovenia
- Slovakia
- Switzerland
- Thailand
- Turkey
- Ukraine
- United States
