= William Dandjinou =

Canadian speed skater (born 2001)

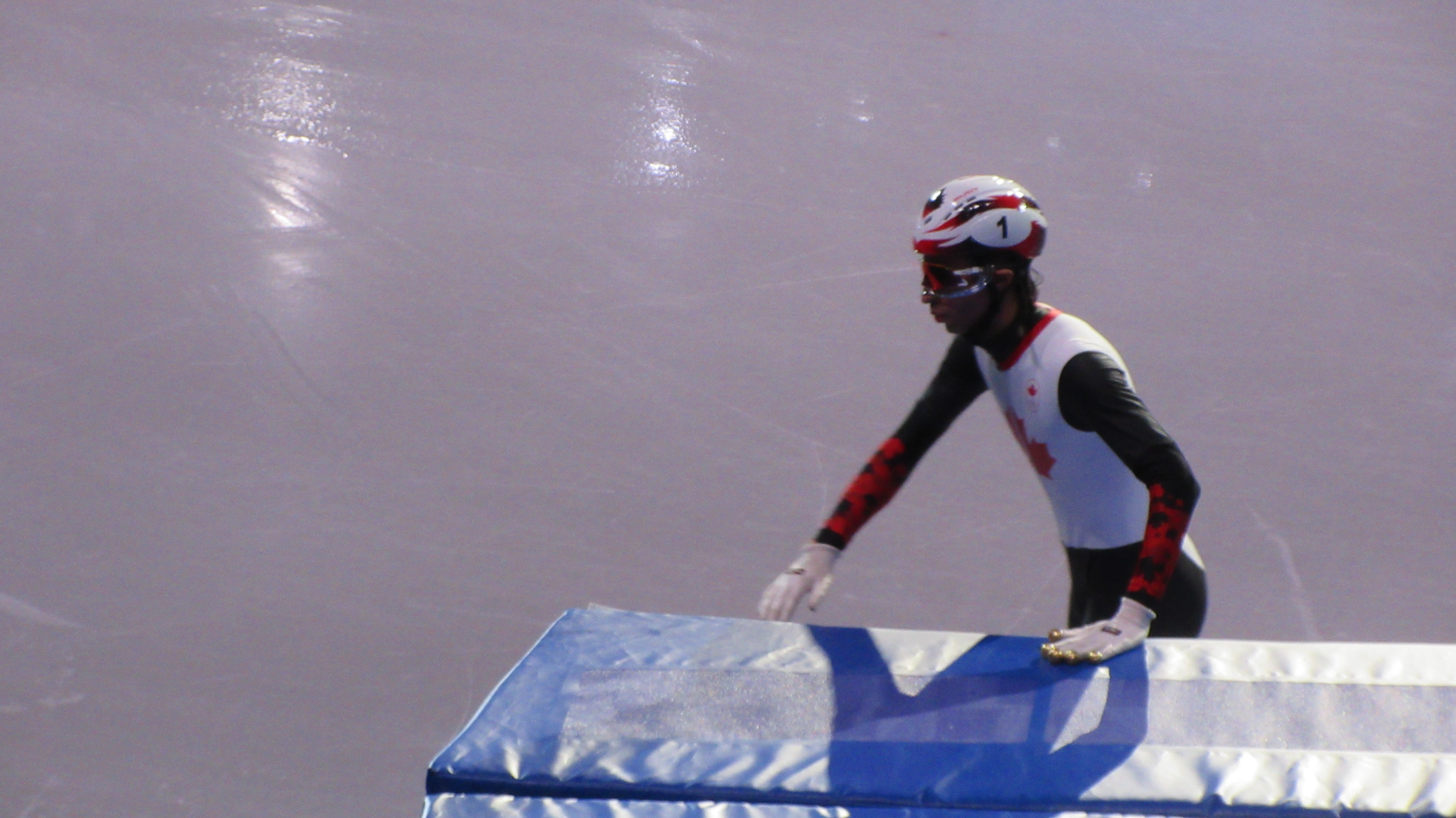
- Dandjinou at the 2026 Winter Olympics

Personal information
- Born: October 1, 2001 (age 25) Sherbrooke, Quebec, Canada
- Height: 191 cm (6 ft 3 in)

Sport
- Country: Canada
- Sport: Short track speed skating
Medal record
Men's short track speed skating
Representing Canada
Olympic Games
Silver medal – second place	2026 Milano Cortina	Mixed 2000 m relay
World Championships
Gold medal – first place	2024 Rotterdam	1000 m
Gold medal – first place	2025 Beijing	1500 m
Gold medal – first place	2025 Beijing	5000 m relay
Gold medal – first place	2025 Beijing	Mixed 2000 m relay
Gold medal – first place	2026 Montreal	5000 m relay
Silver medal – second place	2025 Beijing	1000 m
Silver medal – second place	2026 Montreal	2000 m mixed relay
Four Continents Championships
Gold medal – first place	2024 Laval	1000 m
Bronze medal – third place	2024 Laval	5000 m relay
Bronze medal – third place	2023 Salt Lake City	1000 m

William Dandjinou (born October 1, 2001) is a Canadian short-track speed skater. At the 2026 Winter Olympics, Dandjinou won a silver medal in the gold in the mixed team relay. Dandjinou is a five-time World Champion. Dandjinou is noted for being "unusually tall for a short-tracker" measuring 6-foot-3 without skates, considerably above the 5-foot-9 height he considers ideal for the sport.

== Career ==
Dandjinou was left off the Canadian team at the 2022 Winter Olympics and was listed as a reserve, although he did not compete. He would later cite this as a career low point, but a moment which allowed him to gain perspective on what he wanted from his career. Dandjinou later said of the experience that "I'm not here for the medals, although winning is nice. I'm here for the experience in the long run.”

He began the 2023-2024 season with a victory at the Canadian Championships. As part of the 2023–24 ISU Short Track Speed Skating World Cup, Dandjinou won multiple medals across various legs of the competition. At the 2024 Four Continents Short Track Speed Skating Championships in Laval, Quebec, Dandjinou won the gold medal in the 1000 metres event and was part of the bronze medal winning 5000 metres relay team.

Dandjinou would cap the season with a dramatic gold medal on last day of the 2024 World Short Track Speed Skating Championships in Rotterdam, Netherlands, after earlier missing out on medals in the 500 m, 1,500 m and relay event. With two South Korean skaters in the lead with three laps to go, the two Koreans bumped into each other which opened the door for Dandjinou to get into the lead where he stuck his skate out to beat Pietro Sighel of Italy by 0.021 seconds. After the race he said that "Honestly, I didn't expect to have this result today. After the day I had yesterday — probably the worst day I could have imagined with bad results in the 500, 1,500 and relay — I'm just happy to be back. It's not the first time I have had a bad day. It's my first world championships so I had to adjust to the calibre of the races. I wanted to make sure I was locked in for this last day and do my best. No matter what the results were today, I wanted to be happy with myself, so it's just a blessing that I finished as world champion.

In the 2024–25 ISU Short Track World Tour (the replacement for the ISU Short Track Speed Skating World Cup season) Dandjinou became the first Canadian to win the Crystal Globe as the season’s overall top skater, competing in all six World Cup stops, winning eight gold medals and two silver; he took gold in the 500, 1000, and 1500-metre events, the only skater to win gold in each length. His wins led the "Ice Maples" (the team identity for the Canadian national short track speed skating team) to win the team Crystal Globe, awarded to the group of skaters who earn the most points across the six international stops.

At the 2025 World Short Track Speed Skating Championships, Dandjinou broke through with a three gold and one silver medal performance. In his signature 1,500 m event, he won gold ahead of Stijn Desmet and Liu Shaoang. He also won a gold medal in the men's and mixed relay events and won a silver medal in the 1,000 m behind teammate Steven Dubois. Following his four medal haul and three golds for Canada on the same day, Dandjinou said that "I was super happy with my level of execution today; it was probably my best 1,500m of the season. I am happy to share a world title with my teammate Steven and with the girls' relay team."

On December 17, 2025, Dandinjou was named to Canada's 2026 Olympic team. In February 2026, he won a silver medal in the mixed 2000-metre relay.

== Personal life ==
Dandjinou was born in Sherbrooke, Quebec to an Ivorian father and Canadian mother. His mother, Mirabelle Kelly, is a medical biologist.
