= Kristen Santos-Griswold =

American speed skater (born 1994)

Personal information
- Born: Kristen Santos; November 2, 1994 (age 31) Fairfield, Connecticut, U.S.
- Height: 168 cm (5 ft 6 in)

Sport
- Country: United States
- Sport: Short track speed skating
Medal record
Women's short-track speed skating
Representing the United States
World Short Track Championships
Gold medal – first place	2024 Rotterdam	1000 m
Silver medal – second place	2024 Rotterdam	1500 m
Silver medal – second place	2024 Rotterdam	3000 m relay
Bronze medal – third place	2024 Rotterdam	500 m
Bronze medal – third place	2024 Rotterdam	2000 m mixed relay
Four Continents Championships
Gold medal – first place	2023 Salt Lake City	2000 m mixed relay
Gold medal – first place	2024 Laval	500 m
Gold medal – first place	2024 Laval	1000 m
Gold medal – first place	2024 Laval	1500 m
Silver medal – second place	2023 Salt Lake City	500 m
Silver medal – second place	2023 Salt Lake City	1500 m
Silver medal – second place	2024 Laval	2000 m mixed relay
Bronze medal – third place	2023 Salt Lake City	3000 m relay

Kristen Santos-Griswold (born November 2, 1994) is an American short-track speed skater.

== Biography ==
Santos started figure skating at the age of three and became interested in short-track speed skating when she saw a television commercial featuring Dutch short-track speed skater Wilma Boomstra, who later became her coach. She started the sport at the age of nine in her hometown of Fairfield, Connecticut. After high school, she moved to Salt Lake City to combine her sport with a degree in kinesiology at the University of Utah.

== Career ==
Santos entered her first professional competition in 2013 and entered the US Olympic qualifying tournament in early 2014 but failed to qualify for the 2014 Winter Olympics in Russia. In 2015, she participated in her first World Cup. In Dresden, she raced the 500 and 1500 meters and placed 32nd and 28th, respectively. A few days later, she took part in the 2015 Winter Universiade for the United States. In February 2019, Santos was on the podium for the first time in the World Cup. With the mixed relay team, Santos, Aaron Tran, Jonathan So, and Maame Biney won bronze in Turin. Later that year, she became American champion in the 1000 and 1500 meters and therefore also won the all-round classification. In the 2019–20 season, she won her first individual medal in the World Cup: bronze in Nagoya in the 1000 meters. She also won bronze that season with the relay team (Santos, Biney, Julie Letai, and Corinne Stoddard) in Shanghai.

Santos experienced her breakthrough in 2021 by finishing eighth in the final standings during the 2021 World Championships in Dordrecht. She was also second in the final standings of the 2021–22 World Cup behind Suzanne Schulting due to a third place in Beijing and a win in Nagoya over 1000 meters. In the 1500 meters, she finished fourth in the final standings with a bronze medal over that distance in Beijing. She also qualified for her first Olympics.

In 2023, Santos completed the Four Continents Short Track Speed Skating Championships and won three gold medals in the 500 meters, 1000 meters and 1500 meters, and the silver medal in the 2000 meter mixed relay. That year she became the first American female short track speed skater to win a World Cup 500m race.

In 2024, Santos completed the 2024 World Short Track Speed Skating Championships and won five medals, the gold in the 1000 meters, the silver in the 1500 meters and the 3000 meter relay, and the bronze in the 500 meters and the 2000 meter mixed relay.

Also in 2024, Santos won her first World Cup 1500m race, making her the second, and the first female, U.S. short track speed skater to win in all three distances in the circuit's history.

In 2026, her hometown of Fairfield recognized her accomplishments with a proclamation declaring March 24, 2026 as "Kristen Santos-Griswold Day."

== World Tour medal record ==
Crystal Globe title

In the 2024–25, Santos won the Crystal Globe for best overall skater of the World Tour.

Season		
Season	Discipline	Points
2024–2025	Overall champion & 500 m winner	1120

Season	Location	500 meter
2024–2025	(Canada) Montreal	2nd place, silver medalist(s)
2024–2025	(South Korea) Seoul	1st place, gold medalist(s)
2024–2025	(Netherlands) Tilburg	3rd place, bronze medalist(s)
2024–2025	(Italy) Milan	1st place, gold medalist(s)
2025–2026	(Canada) Montreal	3rd place, bronze medalist(s)

Season	Location	1000 meter
2024–2025	(Canada) Montreal	2nd place, silver medalist(s)
2024–2025	(Italy) Milan	1st place, gold medalist(s)

Season	Location	1500 meter
2024–2025	(China) Beijing	2nd place, silver medalist(s)
2024–2025	(South Korea) Seoul	1st place, gold medalist(s)
2024–2025	(Italy) Milan	2nd place, silver medalist(s)
2025–2026	(Canada) Montreal	3rd place, bronze medalist(s)

Season	Location	3000m relay
2024–2025	(Netherlands) Tilburg	3rd place, bronze medalist(s)
2025–2026	(Poland) Gdańsk	2nd place, silver medalist(s)
2025–2026	(Netherlands) Dordrecht	3rd place, bronze medalist(s)

Season	Location	Mixed relay
2024–2025	(China) Beijing	3rd place, bronze medalist(s)
2024–2025	(Netherlands) Tilburg	3rd place, bronze medalist(s)
2025–2026	(Netherlands) Dordrecht	2nd place, silver medalist(s)
