= Alyson Charles =

Canadian short track speed skater

Personal information
- Nationality: Canadian
- Born: October 30, 1998 (age 27) Montreal, Quebec
- Height: 170 cm (5 ft 7 in)

Sport
- Country: Canada
- Sport: Short track speed skating
- Club: Patinage de Vitesse St-Michel

Achievements and titles
- Personal best(s): 500m: 42.934 (2018); 1000m: 1:28.214 (2018); 1500m: 2:25.134 (2017); 3000m: 5:52.221 (2016)
Medal record
Women's short track speed skating
Representing Canada
World Championships
| Silver medal – second place | 2022 Montreal | 3000 m relay |
| Bronze medal – third place | 2019 Sofia | 3000 m relay |
World Junior Championships
| Gold medal – first place | 2018 Tomaszów Mazowiecki | 3000 m relay |

Alyson Charles (born October 30, 1998) is a Canadian short track speed skater. She participated at the 2019 World Short Track Speed Skating Championships, winning a bronze medal in the 3,000 m relay.

== Career ==
Charles competed at the 2016 and 2017 ISU World Junior Championships. Charles won the gold medal in the 3000m relay at the 2018 ISU World Junior Championships.

Charles won her first-ever World Cup medal in 500m at Calgary in 2018. She participated at the 2019 World Short Track Speed Skating Championships, winning a bronze medal in the 3000m relay.

== Personal life ==
Charles began skating at the age of six in Montreal, Quebec.
