= Noh Ah-reum =

South Korean speed skater

Noh Ah-Reum
Personal information
- Born: December 18, 1991 (age 34) South Korea
- Height: 1.59 m (5 ft 3 in)

Sport
- Country: South Korea
- Sport: Short track speed skating
Medal record
Women's short track speed skating
Representing South Korea
World Junior Championships
Gold medal – first place	2008 Bolzano	Overall
Gold medal – first place	2009 Sherbrooke	Overall

- Noh Ah-reum
- Hangul: 노아름
- RR: No Areum
- MR: No Arŭm

Noh Ah-Reum (Korean: 노아름; born December 18, 1991) is a South Korean female short track speed skater.

== Career ==
Noh won three distances and the overall classification at the 2008 World Junior Championships in Bolzano. She became the overall champion again at the 2009 World Junior Championships in Sherbrooke.

== Career highlights ==
ISU World Junior Short Track Speed Skating Championships
2008 - Bolzano, (gold) 1st overall classification

1st at 1500m, 1500m super final and 1000m

== Filmography ==
=== Television series ===
Year	Title	Role	Notes	Ref.
2022	Mental Coach Jegal	Mo Ah-reum	Debut as an actress	
