= Félix Roussel =

Canadian speed skater (born 2001)

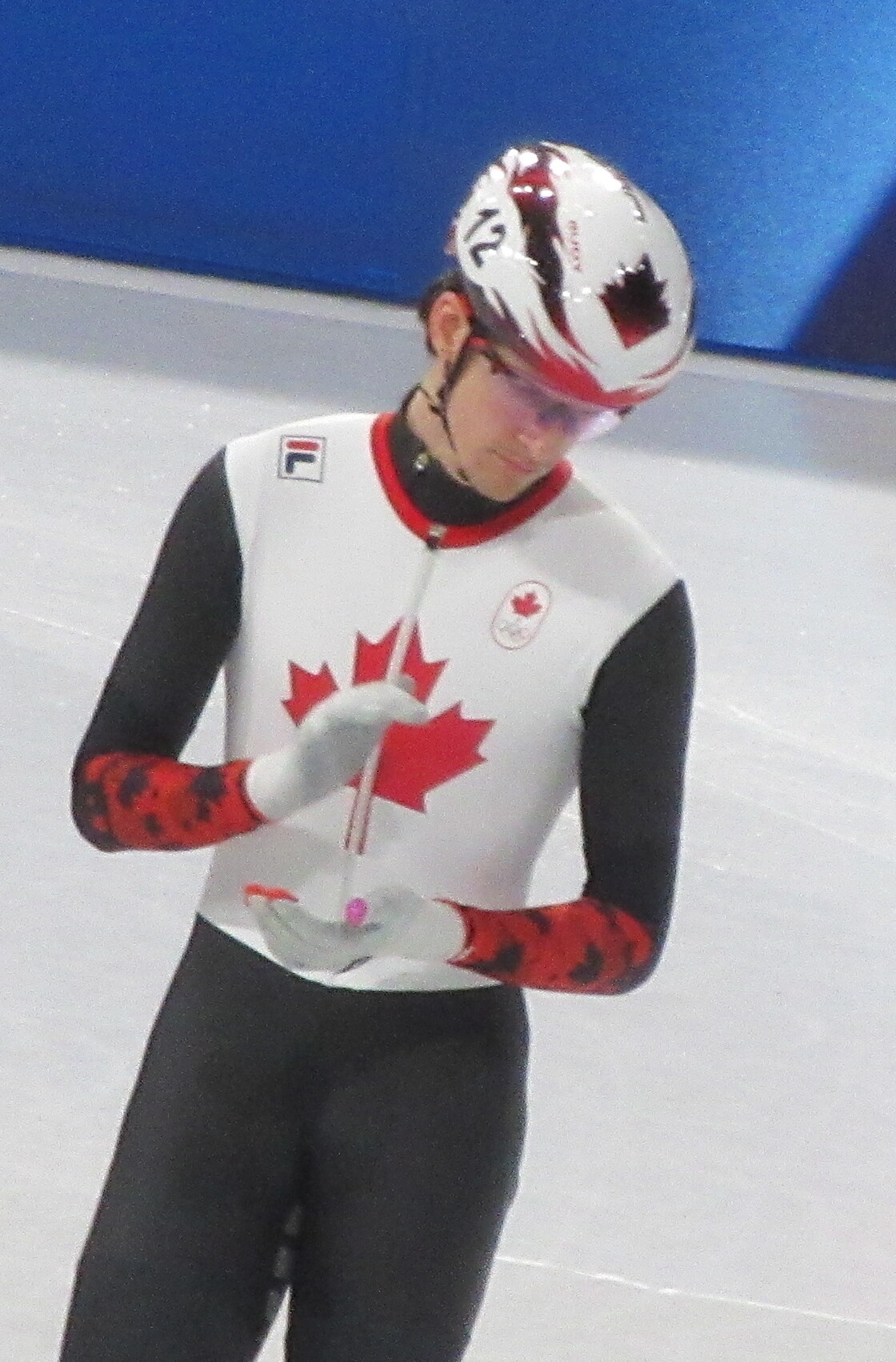
- Roussel at the 2026 Winter Olympics

Personal information
- Born: August 10, 2001 (age 24) Sherbrooke, Quebec, Canada

Sport
- Country: Canada
- Sport: Short track speed skating
Medal record
Men's short track speed skating
Representing Canada
Olympic Games
Silver medal – second place	2026 Milano Cortina	Mixed 2000 m relay
World Championships
Gold medal – first place	2025 Beijing	5000 m relay
Gold medal – first place	2026 Montreal	5000 m relay
Silver medal – second place	2026 Montreal	2000 m mixed relay

Félix Roussel (French pronunciation: [feliks ʁusɛl]; born August 10, 2001) is a Canadian short-track speed skater. He is a two-time world champion.

== Career ==
He won a gold medal as a member of the Canadian men's relay team at the 2025 world championships.

On December 17, 2025, Roussel was named to Canada's 2026 Olympic team. In February 2026, he won a silver medal in the mixed 2000-metre relay.
