= Jordan Pierre-Gilles =

Canadian short-track speed skater

Personal information
- Born: May 24, 1998 (age 28) Sherbrooke, Quebec, Canada

Sport
- Country: Canada
- Sport: Short-track speed skating
Medal record
Men's short-track speed skating
Representing Canada
Olympic Games
Gold medal – first place	2022 Beijing	5000 m relay
World Championships
Gold medal – first place	2025 Beijing	5000 m relay
Gold medal – first place	2026 Montreal	5000 m relay
Bronze medal – third place	2022 Montreal	5000 m relay
Bronze medal – third place	2024 Rotterdam	500 m

Jordan Pierre-Gilles (born May 24, 1998) is a Canadian short-track speed skater.

== Career ==
Pierre-Gilles made his World Cup debut in the 2019–2020 season, helping Canada to a bronze medal in the mixed relay at the Shanghai stop and gold in the men's 5000 metres relay at the last stop in Dordrecht.

Pierre-Gilles made his World Championships debut at the 2021 World Short Track Speed Skating Championships. Pierre-Gilles followed this up with a third-place finish at the Canadian Championships in August 2021, allowing him to be named to the Canadian team for the upcoming World Cup season.

On January 18, 2022, Pierre-Gilles was named to Canada's 2022 Olympic team. Pierre-Gilles won a gold medal as part of Canada's team in the 5000 m relay event. On December 17, 2025, Piere-Gilles was named to Canada's 2026 Olympic team.
