= Maurice Richard Arena =

Multi-purpose arena at Olympic Park in Montreal, Quebec

Coordinates: 45°33′44″N 73°32′50″W

- Aréna Maurice-Richard
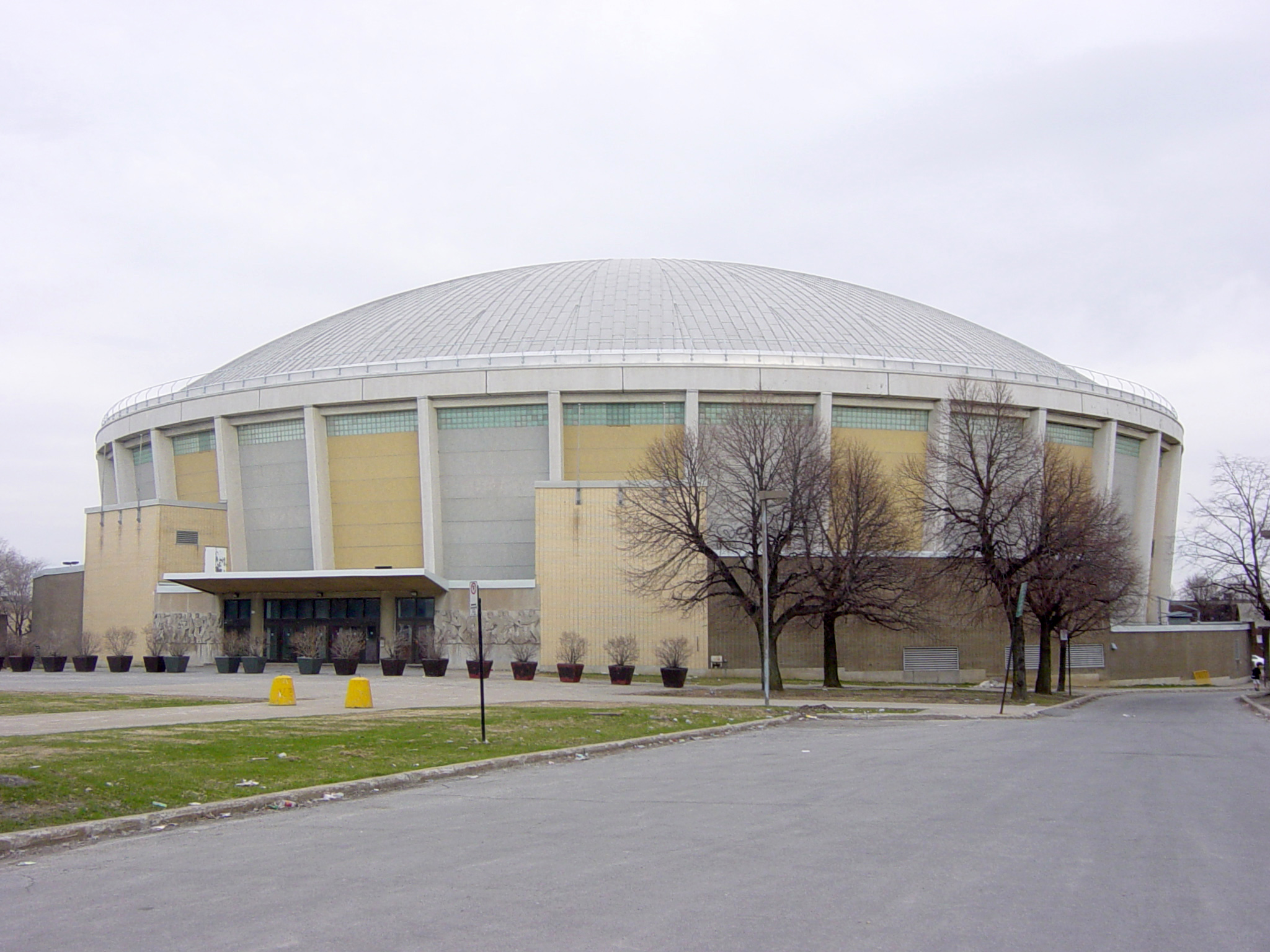
- Maurice Richard Arena seen in 2007
- Interactive map of Maurice Richard Arena
- Address: 2800, rue Viau
- Location: Montreal, Quebec, Canada
- Owner: City of Montreal
- Capacity: Hockey: 4,750

Construction
- Opened: 1962
- Architect: Jean-Julien Perrault

Tenant
- Montreal Rocket (QMJHL) (1999-2003)

Maurice Richard Arena (French: Aréna Maurice-Richard) is a 4,750-seat multi-purpose arena at Olympic Park in Montreal, Quebec, Canada. It was built in 1962. It is named in honour of Maurice Richard.

The rink was renovated in 1994, the arena includes a multi-media exhibition on the life of the Montreal Canadiens great. Entrance to the arena is free and there is a souvenir shop onsite. Formerly home to the Montreal Rocket, the ice rink is also used for training by speed and figure skaters. It can host corporate events, with banquet seating for up to 2,000.

The arena also hosted boxing and wrestling events at the 1976 Summer Olympics. The building is located on the same massive city block that is home to Olympic Stadium and Saputo Stadium. It is situated in the south east corner, next to the Biodome (formerly the cycling Velodrome) and the Olympic Stadium. The arena still hosts fight cards and concerts, and hosted the 2014 Scotties Tournament of Hearts.
