= Steven Dubois =

Canadian speed skater (born 1997)

Personal information
- Born: May 1, 1997 (age 29) Laval, Quebec, Canada
- Height: 1.68 m (5 ft 6 in)

Sport
- Country: Canada
- Sport: Short-track speed skating
Medal record
Men's short-track speed skating
Representing Canada
Olympic Games
Gold medal – first place	2022 Beijing	5000 m relay
Gold medal – first place	2026 Milano Cortina	500 m
Silver medal – second place	2022 Beijing	1500 m
Silver medal – second place	2026 Milano Cortina	Mixed 2000 m relay
Bronze medal – third place	2022 Beijing	500 m
World Championships
Gold medal – first place	2025 Beijing	1000 m
Gold medal – first place	2025 Beijing	5000 m relay
Gold medal – first place	2025 Beijing	2000 m mixed relay
Gold medal – first place	2025 Beijing	500 m
Gold medal – first place	2026 Montreal	500 m
Gold medal – first place	2026 Montreal	5000 m relay
Silver medal – second place	2023 Seoul	500 m
Silver medal – second place	2026 Montreal	2000 m mixed relay
Bronze medal – third place	2022 Montreal	5000 m relay
Bronze medal – third place	2023 Seoul	1000 m
World Junior Championships
Bronze medal – third place	2016 Sofia	500 m

Steven Dubois (French pronunciation: [stivœn dybwa]; born May 1, 1997) is a Canadian short-track speed skater. He is a five-time Olympic medalist and six-time world champion. He is the reigning world champion in the 500 m event, winning gold at the 2026 Milano-Cortina Olympic Games.

== Career ==
=== Junior ===
At the 2016 World Junior Short Track Speed Skating Championships in Sofia, Bulgaria, Dubois won the bronze medal in the 500 m event.

=== Senior ===
Dubois joined Canada's World Cup team for the first time in 2017 and was a reserve for the 2018 Winter Olympics. His first full season as part of the World Cup team was in the 2018–19 season, winning bronze in three of the World Cup stops in the 1500 m event.

The following season, Dubois won his first individual World Cup race, the 500 m event in Dresden, among a silver and two bronze individual (versus team) medals he won at other stops during the season. At the 2020 Four Continents Short Track Speed Skating Championships, the first edition of the event, Dubois won silver in all five events (500 m, 1000m, 1500 m, 5000 m relay and overall). Dubois also took top place at the 2021 Canadian Short Track Speed Skating Championships, .

On January 18, 2022, Dubois was named to Canada's 2022 Olympic team. At the Olympics, he won the silver medal in the 1,500 metres event. He followed up his silver medal win with a bronze medal in the 500 metres event. Dubois finished his Olympics with a gold medal win as part of Canada's team in the 5000 m relay event.

In the summer of 2025, Dubois began suffering from a partial tear of the labrum in his hip, which forced him to miss the start of the season so he could recover in the lead up to the 2026 Winter Olympics. On December 17, 2025, Dubois was named to Canada's 2026 Olympic team. In February 2026, he won a silver medal in the mixed 2000-metre relay and the gold medal in the 500 m individual at the Milano-Cortina Olympics. He was selected as Canada's flag-bearer for the closing ceremony of the Games, alongside Valérie Maltais.
