= Courtney Sarault =

Canadian speed skater (born 2000)

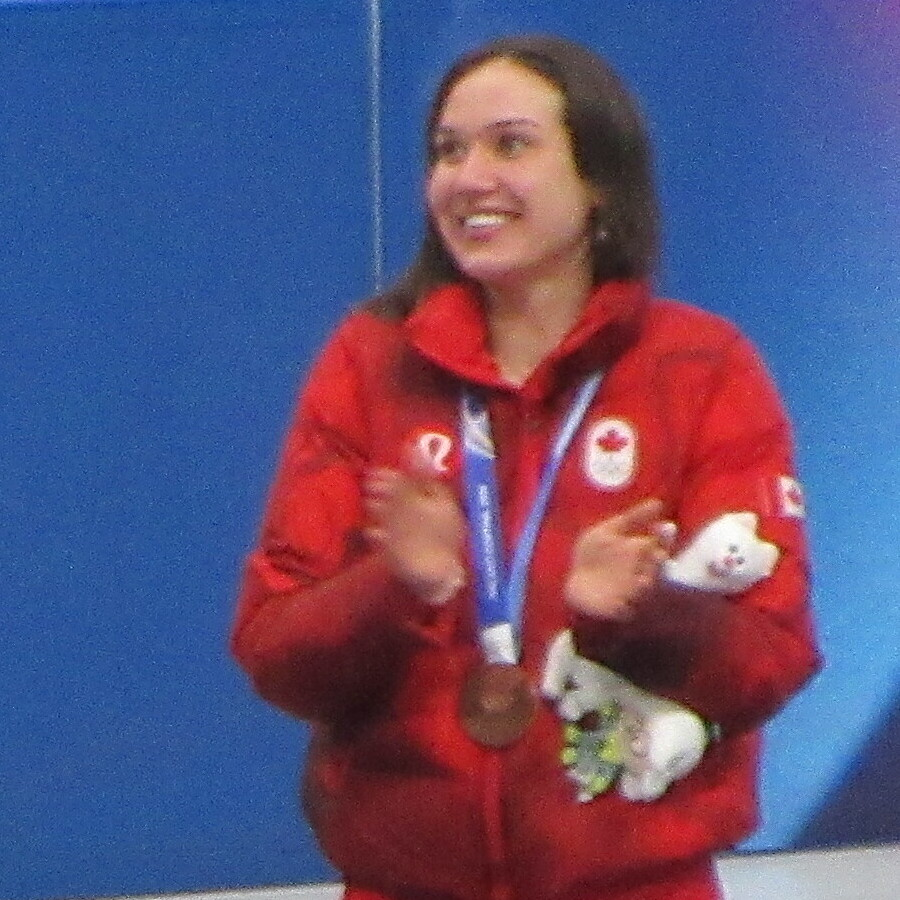
- Sarault at the 2026 Winter Olympics

Personal information
- Nationality: Canadian
- Born: April 24, 2000 (age 26) Grand Rapids, Michigan, U.S.
- Home town: Moncton, New Brunswick, Canada
- Height: 174 cm (5 ft 9 in)

Sport
- Country: Canada
- Sport: Short track speed skating
- Club: Codiac Cyclones

Achievements and titles
- Personal bests: 500m: 42.176 (2025); 1000m: 1:27:470 (2021); 1500m: 2:17:707 (2021); 3000m: 5:07:250 (2022)
Medal record
Women's short-track speed skating
Representing Canada
Event	1st	2nd	3rd
Olympic Games	0	2	2
World Championships	1	6	5
World Junior Championships	1	3	1
Total	2	11	8
Olympic Games
Silver medal – second place	2026 Milano Cortina	1000 m
Silver medal – second place	2026 Milano Cortina	Mixed 2000 m relay
Bronze medal – third place	2026 Milano Cortina	500 m
Bronze medal – third place	2026 Milano Cortina	3000 m relay
World Championships
Gold medal – first place	2025 Beijing	3000 m relay
Silver medal – second place	2021 Dordrecht	1500 m
Silver medal – second place	2021 Dordrecht	Overall
Silver medal – second place	2022 Montreal	3000 m relay
Silver medal – second place	2025 Beijing	1000 m
Silver medal – second place	2025 Beijing	1500 m
Silver medal – second place	2026 Montreal	2000 m mixed relay
Bronze medal – third place	2019 Sofia	3000 m relay
Bronze medal – third place	2021 Dordrecht	1000 m
Bronze medal – third place	2023 Seoul	1000 m
Bronze medal – third place	2023 Seoul	3000 m relay
Bronze medal – third place	2024 Rotterdam	3000 m relay
World Junior Championships
Gold medal – first place	2018 Tomaszów Mazowiecki	3000 m relay
Silver medal – second place	2018 Tomaszów Mazowiecki	Overall
Silver medal – second place	2018 Tomaszów Mazowiecki	1000 m
Silver medal – second place	2018 Tomaszów Mazowiecki	1500 m
Bronze medal – third place	2019 Montréal	1500 m

Courtney Lee Sarault (born April 24, 2000) is a Canadian short track speed skater. She is a four-time Olympic medalist and winner of the Crystal Globe title for the 2025 Short Track World Tour. As of February 2026, she is ranked as the world #1 in the women's 1,000m short track distance.

== Career ==
=== Junior ===
Sarault competed at the 2015 Canada Games at the age of 14. She placed 30th, 8th, and 7th in 500m, 1000m and 1500m, respectively, and won a silver medal in the 3000m relay.

Sarault participated in the 2017 World Junior Championships. She had her breakout moment at the 2018 World Junior Championships, where she finished second overall after winning two thousand silver medals in the 1000m and 1500m. She also captured gold with the 3000m relay team. Sarault was named Short Track Rising Star of the Year by Speed Skating Canada.

Sarault won a bronze medal in 1500m at the 2019 World Junior Championships.

=== Senior ===
Sarault made her world cup debut during the 2018–19 season and won her first-ever World Cup medal in 1500m in Calgary. She made her world championship debut at the 2019 World Short Track Speed Skating Championships, winning a bronze medal in the 3000m relay. At the inaugural Four Continents Short Track Speed Skating Championships in 2020, Sarault won 500m bronze and 1000m silver to finish third overall behind Choi Min-jeong and Seo Whi-Min of South Korea.

Sarault finished second overall behind Suzanne Schulting at the 2021 World Championships; Sarault won 1500m silver and 1000m bronze at the only international short track event of the season.

Sarault was named to Team Canada and made her Olympic debut at the 2022 Beijing Olympic Games in February. She participated in the 1000 and 1500 metre events and was a member of the 3000 metre relay team.

On December 17, 2025, Sarault was named to Canada's 2026 Olympic team. In February 2026, she won a silver medal in the mixed 2000-metre relay, a silver medal in the women's 1000-meter, a bronze medal in the women's 500-metre and a bronze medal in the women's 3000-metre relay at the Milano Cortina Olympic Games.

== Personal life ==
Sarault is the daughter of former NHL player Yves Sarault, and was born in Grand Rapids, Michigan while he was a under contract to the Ottawa Senators playing part of a season in the minors with the Grand Rapids Griffins. She began skating at a very young age and took up speed skating at the age of seven.
