= Short-track speed skating at the 2026 Winter Olympics – Mixed 2000 metre relay =

Mixed 2000 metre relay at the XXV Olympic Winter Games
- Short-track speed skating
- Venue: Forum di Milano, Milan
- Date: 10 February
- Competitors: 60 from 12 nations
- Winning time: 2:39.019

Medalists
1st place, gold medalist(s)		Elisa Confortola; Arianna Fontana; Thomas Nadalini; Pietro Sighel; Chiara Betti; Luca Spechenhauser	Italy
2nd place, silver medalist(s)		Kim Boutin; William Dandjinou; Félix Roussel; Courtney Sarault; Florence Brunelle; Steven Dubois	Canada
3rd place, bronze medalist(s)		Hanne Desmet; Stijn Desmet; Tineke den Dulk; Ward Pétré	Belgium

The Mixed 2000 metre relay competition in short-track speed skating at the 2026 Winter Olympics was held on 10 February 2026 at the Forum di Milano in Milan. Italy, represented by Elisa Confortola, Arianna Fontana, Chiara Betti, Thomas Nadalini, Pietro Sighel, and Luca Spechenhauser, won the event. Canada were second and Belgium third.

== Background ==
The 2022 medalists were China (champions), Italy (silver) and Hungary (bronze). Before the Olympics, the Netherlands were leading the 2025–26 ISU Short Track World Tour mixed relay standings. Canada were the 2025 World champion in mixed relay.

== Qualification ==
Countries qualified for the relay competition at the Winter Olympics during the 2025–26 ISU Short Track World Tour. A total of 12 nations qualified for the event.

== Records ==
Prior to this competition, the world and Olympic records were as follows.

World record	Netherlands; Michelle Velzeboer; Xandra Velzeboer; Teun Boer; Jens van 't Wout	2:35.339	Beijing, China	15 March 2025
Olympic record	Netherlands; Suzanne Schulting; Xandra Velzeboer; Itzhak de Laat; Jens van 't Wout	2:36.437	Beijing, China	5 February 2022

The Netherlands established a new Olympic record of 2:35.537 the Final B race.

Date	Round	Athlete	Country	Time	Record	Ref
10 February	Final B	Teun Boer; Selma Poutsma; Xandra Velzeboer; Jens van 't Wout	Netherlands	2:35.537	OR	

== Results ==
=== Quarterfinals ===
10 February 2026, 11:59 AM

Rank	Heat	Country	Athletes	Time	Notes
1	1	Netherlands	Selma Poutsma; Xandra Velzeboer; Jens van 't Wout; Melle van 't Wout	2:36.517	Q
2	1	Italy	Elisa Confortola; Arianna Fontana; Pietro Sighel; Luca Spechenhauser	2:36.581	Q
3	1	Poland	Natalia Maliszewska; Michal Niewinski; Felix Pigeon; Kamila Sellier	2:40.955	
4	1	Hungary	Wonjun Moon; Bence Nogradi; Maja Dora Somodi; Diana Laura Vegi	2:41.327	
1	2	South Korea	Choi Min-jeong; Kim Gil-li; Rim Jong-un; Shin Dong-min	2:39.337	Q
2	2	United States	Andrew Heo; Brandon Kim; Kristen Santos-Griswold; Corinne Stoddard	2:43.894	Q
3	2	France	Etienne Bastier; Berenice Comby; Quentin Fercoq; Cloe Ollivier	2:46.871	ADV
-	2	Japan	Rika Kanai; Shogo Miyata; Mirei Nakashima; Kazuki Yoshinaga	PEN	
1	3	Canada	Florence Brunelle; William Dandjinou; Félix Roussel; Courtney Sarault	2:39.034	Q
2	3	China	Gong Li; Lim Hyo-jun; Sun Long; Zhang Chutong	2:39.193	Q
3	3	Belgium	Hanne Desmet; Stijn Desmet; Tineke den Dulk; Ward Pétré	2:39.932	q
4	3	Kazakhstan	Abzal Azhgaliyev; Yana Khan; Denis Nikisha; Olga Tikhonova	2:42.199	

=== Semifinals ===
10 February 2026, 12:34 PM

Rank	Heat	Country	Athletes	Time	Notes
1	1	Italy	Chiara Betti; Arianna Fontana; Thomas Nadalini; Pietro Sighel	2:37.482	QA
2	1	China	Gong Li; Liu Shaoang; Sun Long; Wang Xinran	2:38.375	QA
3	1	Netherlands	Teun Boer; Michelle Velzeboer; Xandra Velzeboer; Jens van 't Wout	2:53.319	QB
4	1	France	Etienne Bastier; Berenice Comby; Quentin Fercoq; Cloe Ollivier	3:05.547	QB
1	2	Canada	Kim Boutin; William Dandjinou; Steven Dubois; Courtney Sarault	2:39.607	QA
2	2	Belgium	Hanne Desmet; Stijn Desmet; Tineke den Dulk; Ward Pétré	2:39.974	QA
3	2	South Korea	Choi Min-jeong; Hwang Dae-heon; Kim Gil-li; Rim Jong-un	2:46.554	QB
4	2	United States	Andrew Heo; Brandon Kim; Kristen Santos-Griswold; Corinne Stoddard	2:53.341	QB

=== Finals ===
==== Final B ====
10 February 2026, 13:00 PM

Rank	Country	Athletes	Time	Notes
1	Netherlands	Teun Boer; Selma Poutsma; Xandra Velzeboer; Jens van 't Wout	2:35.537	OR
2	South Korea	Choi Min-jeong; Hwang Dae-heon; Noh Do-hee; Shin Dong-min	2:40.319	
3	France	Etienne Bastier; Quentin Fercoq; Aurelie Leveque; Cloe Ollivier	2:47.708	
4	United States	Andrew Heo; Brandon Kim; Julie Letai; Kristen Santos-Griswold	2:57.160	

==== Final A ====
10 February 2026, 13:09 PM

Rank	Country	Athletes	Time	Notes
1st place, gold medalist(s)	Italy	Elisa Confortola; Arianna Fontana; Thomas Nadalini; Pietro Sighel	2:39.019	
2nd place, silver medalist(s)	Canada	Kim Boutin; William Dandjinou; Félix Roussel; Courtney Sarault	2:39.258	
3rd place, bronze medalist(s)	Belgium	Hanne Desmet; Stijn Desmet; Tineke den Dulk; Ward Pétré	2:39.353	
4	China	Gong Li; Liu Shaoang; Sun Long; Zhang Chutong	2:39.601	

==== Final ranking ====
Rank	Country	Athletes	QF	SF	FB	FA	Best Time
1st place, gold medalist(s)	Italy	Elisa Confortola; Chiara Betti; Arianna Fontana; Thomas Nadalini; Pietro Sighel; Luca Spechenhauser	2	1		1	2:36.581
2nd place, silver medalist(s)	Canada	Kim Boutin; William Dandjinou; Félix Roussel; Courtney Sarault; Florence Brunelle; Steven Dubois	1	1		2	2:39.034
3rd place, bronze medalist(s)	Belgium	Hanne Desmet; Stijn Desmet; Tineke den Dulk; Ward Pétré	3	2		3	2:39.353
4	China	Gong Li; Liu Shaoang; Sun Long; Zhang Chutong; Wang Xinran; Lin Xiaojun	2	2		4	2:38.375
5	Netherlands	Teun Boer; Selma Poutsma; Michelle Velzeboer; Xandra Velzeboer; Jens van 't Wout; Melle van 't Wout	1	3	1		2:35.537
6	South Korea	Choi Min-jeong; Kim Gil-li; Hwang Dae-heon; Noh Do-hee; Shin Dong-min; Rim Jong-un	1	3	2		2:39.337
7	France	Etienne Bastier; Quentin Fercoq; Aurelie Leveque; Cloe Ollivier; Bérénice Comby	3	4	3		2:46.871
8	United States	Andrew Heo; Brandon Kim; Julie Letai; Kristen Santos-Griswold; Corinne Stoddard	2	4	4		2:43.894
9	Poland	Natalia Maliszewska; Michal Niewinski; Felix Pigeon; Kamila Sellier	3				2:40.955
10	Hungary	Wonjun Moon; Bence Nogradi; Maja Dora Somodi; Diana Laura Vegi	4				2:41.327
11	Kazakhstan	Abzal Azhgaliyev; Yana Khan; Denis Nikisha; Olga Tikhonova	4				2:42.199
12	Japan	Rika Kanai; Shogo Miyata; Mirei Nakashima; Kazuki Yoshinaga	PEN				-
