= Short-track speed skating at the 2026 Winter Olympics =

Short-track speed skating at the XXV Olympic Winter Games
- Short-track speed skating pictogram
- Venue: Milano Ice Skating Arena
- Dates: 10–20 February
- No. of events: 9 (4 men, 4 women, 1 mixed)
- Competitors: 112

Short-track speed skating at the 2026 Winter Olympics was held at the Milano Ice Skating Arena in Milan, Italy. The races took place between 10 and 20 February 2026. A total of nine short-track speed skating competitions were held, the same as in 2022. Also the number of quota spots, a total of 112 (56 per gender) stayed the same.

== Qualification ==
A total quota of 112 athletes are scheduled to compete (57 men and 55 women). Countries were assigned quotas using the results of the 2025–26 World Tour in the autumn of 2025.

== Competition schedule ==
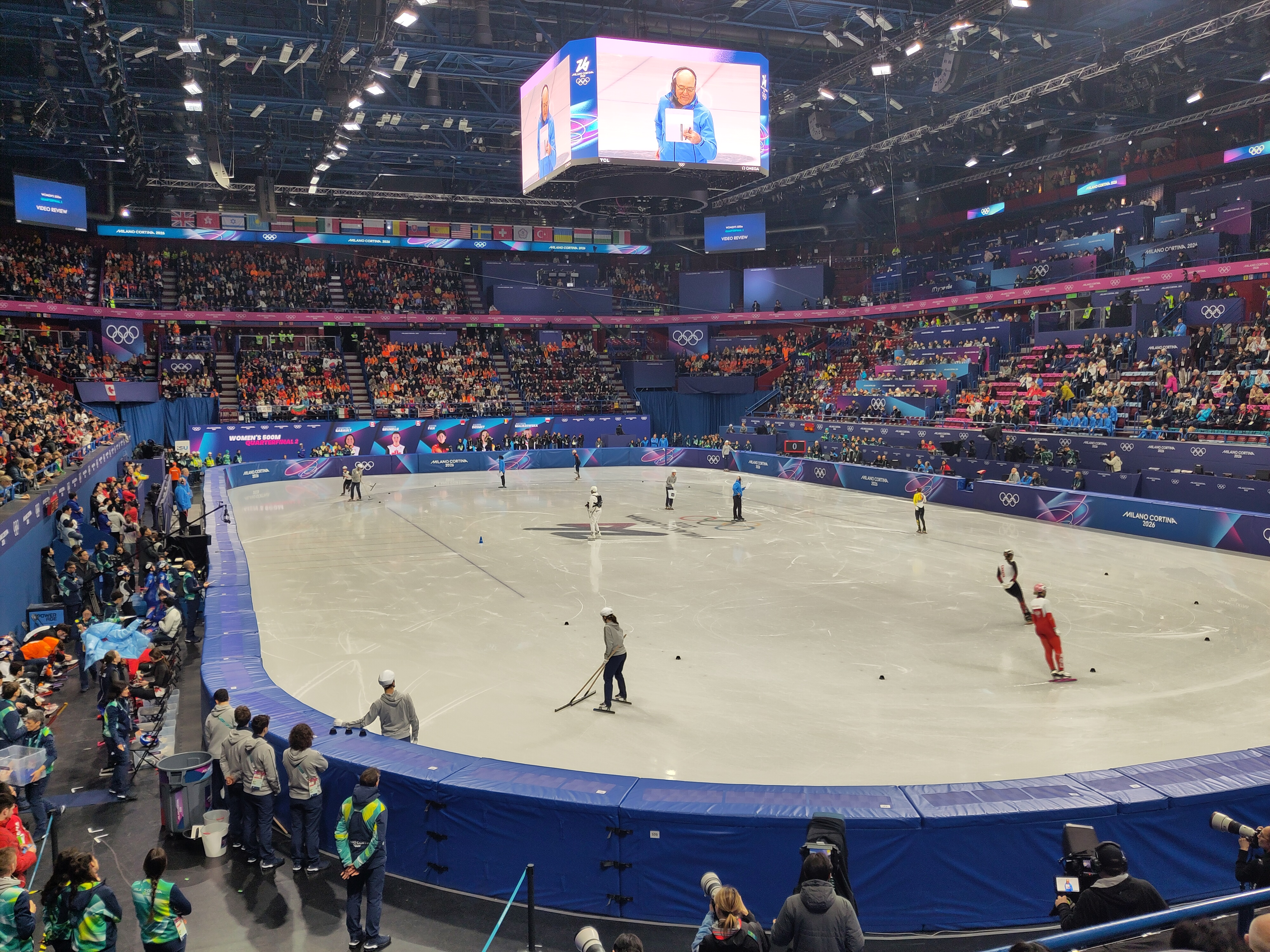
The Milano Ice Skating Arena hosted the short track speed skating events

The following is the competition schedule for all nine events. Sessions that included the event finals are shown in bold.

All times are (UTC+1).

Date	Time	Event	Round
10 February	10:30	Women's 500 metres	Heats
10 February	11:08	Men's 1000 metres	Heats
10 February	11:53	**Mixed team relay**	Quarterfinals
10 February	12:23	**Mixed team relay**	Semifinals
10 February	12:48	**Mixed team relay**	Finals
12 February	20:15	**Women's 500 metres**	Quarterfinals
12 February	20:58	**Women's 500 metres**	Semifinals
12 February	21:16	**Women's 500 metres**	Finals
12 February	20:29	**Men's 1000 metres**	Quarterfinals
12 February	21:05	**Men's 1000 metres**	Semifinals
12 February	21:37	**Men's 1000 metres**	Finals
14 February	20:15	**Men's 1500 metres**	Quarterfinals
14 February	21:44	**Men's 1500 metres**	Semifinals
14 February	22:27	**Men's 1500 metres**	Finals
14 February	20:59	Women's 1000 metres	Heats
14 February	22:00	Women's 3000 metre relay	Semifinals
16 February	11:00	**Women's 1000 metres**	Quarterfinals
16 February	11:55	**Women's 1000 metres**	Semifinals
16 February	12:36	**Women's 1000 metres**	Finals
16 February	11:18	Men's 500 metres	Heats
16 February	12:04	Men's 5000 metre relay	Semifinals
18 February	20:15	**Men's 500 metres**	Quarterfinals
18 February	20:42	**Men's 500 metres**	Semifinals
18 February	21:24	**Men's 500 metres**	Finals
18 February	20:50	**Women's 3000 metre relay**	Finals
20 February	20:15	**Women's 1500 metres**	Quarterfinals
20 February	21:00	**Women's 1500 metres**	Semifinals
20 February	21:56	**Women's 1500 metres**	Finals
20 February	21:17	**Men's 5000 metre relay**	Finals

== Participating nations ==
A total of 112 athletes qualified to participate, including 110 athletes representing 23 nations and two Individual Neutral Athletes.

The numbers in parentheses represents the number of participants entered.

- Australia (1)
- Austria (1)
- Belgium (6)
- Canada (10)
- China (10)
- Croatia (2)
- Czech Republic (1)
- France (6)
- Great Britain (1)
- Hong Kong (2)
- Hungary (6)
- Individual Neutral Athletes (2)
- Italy (10)
- Japan (9)
- Kazakhstan (4)
- Latvia (2)
- Netherlands (10)
- Poland (5)
- Slovakia (1)
- South Korea (10)
- Turkey (2)
- Ukraine (2)
- United States (8)
- Uzbekistan (1)

== Medal summary ==
=== Medal table ===
* Host nation (Italy)

Rank	Nation	Gold	Silver	Bronze	Total
1	Netherlands	5	1	1	7
2	South Korea	2	3	2	7
3	Canada	1	2	2	5
4	Italy*	1	2	1	4
5	China	0	1	0	1
6	Belgium	0	0	1	1
6	Latvia	0	0	1	1
6	United States	0	0	1	1
Totals (8 entries)		9	9	9	27

=== Men's events ===
Event	Gold		Silver		Bronze	
500 metres	Steven Dubois; Canada	40.835	Melle van 't Wout; Netherlands	40.912	Jens van 't Wout; Netherlands	41.908
1000 metres	Jens van 't Wout; Netherlands	1:24.537	Sun Long; China	1:24.565	Rim Jong-un; South Korea	1:24.611
1500 metres	Jens van 't Wout; Netherlands	2:12.219	Hwang Dae-heon; South Korea	2:12.304	Roberts Krūzbergs; Latvia	2:12.376
5000 metre relay	Netherlands; Teun Boer; Friso Emons; Jens van 't Wout; Melle van 't Wout; Itzhak de Laat^{[a]}	6:51.847	South Korea; Hwang Dae-heon; Lee Jeong-min; Lee June-seo; Rim Jong-un; Shin Dong-min^{[a]}	6:52.239	Italy; Pietro Sighel; Thomas Nadalini; Luca Spechenhauser; Andrea Cassinelli	6:52.335

=== Women's events ===
Event	Gold		Silver		Bronze	
500 metres	Xandra Velzeboer; Netherlands	41.609	Arianna Fontana; Italy	42.294	Courtney Sarault; Canada	42.427
1000 metres	Xandra Velzeboer; Netherlands	1:28.437	Courtney Sarault; Canada	1:28.523	Kim Gil-li; South Korea	1:28.614
1500 metres	Kim Gil-li; South Korea	2:32.076	Choi Min-jeong; South Korea	2:32.450	Corinne Stoddard; United States	2:32.578
3000 metre relay	South Korea; Choi Min-jeong; Kim Gil-li; Shim Suk-hee; Noh Do-hee; Lee So-yeon^{[a]}	4:04.014	Italy; Elisa Confortola; Arianna Fontana; Chiara Betti; Arianna Sighel	4:04.107	Canada; Danaé Blais; Florence Brunelle; Kim Boutin; Courtney Sarault	4:04.314

=== Mixed event ===
Event	Gold		Silver		Bronze	
2000 metre relay	Italy; Elisa Confortola; Arianna Fontana; Thomas Nadalini; Pietro Sighel; Chiara Betti^{[a]} Luca Spechenhauser^{[a]}	2.39.019	Canada; Kim Boutin; William Dandjinou; Félix Roussel; Courtney Sarault; Florence Brunelle^{[a]} Steven Dubois^{[a]}	2.39.258	Belgium; Hanne Desmet; Stijn Desmet; Tineke den Dulk; Ward Pétré	2.39.353

^{a} Skaters who did not participate in the final, but received medals.

== Records ==
World records (WR) and Olympic records (OR) set during the competition.

Event	Date	Round	Athlete	Country	Time	Record	Ref
Mixed 2000 metre relay	10 February	Final B	Xandra Velzeboer; Michelle Velzeboer; Teun Boer; Jens van 't Wout	Netherlands	2:35.537	OR	
Women's 500 metres	12 February	Semifinal 1	Xandra Velzeboer	Netherlands	41.399	WR, OR	
