= Short-track speed skating at the 2026 Winter Olympics – Men's 500 metres =

Men's 500 metres at the XXV Olympic Winter Games
- Short-track speed skating
- Venue: Forum di Milano, Milan
- Date: 16 and 18 February
- Competitors: 32 from 18 nations

Medalists
1st place, gold medalist(s)		Steven Dubois	Canada
2nd place, silver medalist(s)		Melle van 't Wout	Netherlands
3rd place, bronze medalist(s)		Jens van 't Wout	Netherlands

The men's 500 metres competition in short-track speed skating at the 2026 Winter Olympics will be held on 16 February (heats) and 18 February (finals), 2026 at the Forum di Milano in Milan. Steven Dubois of Canada won the event, with brothers Melle van 't Wout and Jens van 't Wout, both of the Netherlands, winning the silver and bronze medal, respectively.

== Background ==
The defending champion Shaoang Liu qualified, though he switched from representing Hungary to China. The 2022 bronze medalist, Steven Dubois, qualified as well. The silver medalist, Konstantin Ivliev, did not compete internationally since the start of the Russian invasion of Ukraine. Before the Olympics, William Dandjinou was leading the 2025–26 ISU Short Track World Tour 500 m standings as well as the overall standings. Steven Dubois was the 500 m 2025 World champion.

== Qualification ==
Countries were assigned quotas based on their performance during the 2025–26 ISU Short Track World Tour. A total of 32 athletes from 18 nations qualified for the event.

== Records ==
Prior to this competition, the world and Olympic records were as follows.

World record	Wu Dajing (CHN)	39.505	Salt Lake City, United States	11 November 2018
Olympic record	Wu Dajing (CHN)	39.584	Gangneung, South Korea	22 February 2018

== Results ==
=== Heats ===
16 February 2026, 11:18 AM

Rank	Heat	Name	Country	Time	Notes
1	1	William Dandjinou	Canada	40.593	Q
2	1	Teun Boer	Netherlands	52.425	Q
3	1	Kazuki Yoshinaga	Japan	1:09.908	ADV
	1	Stijn Desmet	Belgium		PEN
1	2	Abzal Azhgaliyev	Kazakhstan	40.934	Q
2	2	Pietro Sighel	Italy	40.942	Q
3	2	Reinis Bērziņš	Latvia	41.758	
	2	Furkan Akar	Turkey		PEN
1	3	Steven Dubois	Canada	40.284	Q
2	3	Won-jun Moon	Hungary	40.718	Q
3	3	Denis Nikisha	Kazakhstan	40.818	q
4	3	Shōgo Miyata	Japan	40.886	
1	4	Shaoang Liu	China	41.100	Q
2	4	Félix Pigeon	Poland	41.179	Q
3	4	Dae-heon Hwang	South Korea	41.191	
4	4	Nico Andermann	Austria	41.450	
1	5	Maxime Laoun	Canada	40.943	Q
2	5	Lorenzo Previtali	Italy	40.993	Q
3	5	Denis Örs	Turkey	44.651	ADV
	5	Sun Long	China		PEN
1	6	Melle van 't Wout	Netherlands	40.809	Q
2	6	Thomas Nadalini	Italy	40.921	Q
3	6	Michał Niewiński	Poland	41.174	
4	6	Brendan Corey	Australia	41.845	
1	7	Jens van 't Wout	Netherlands	40.567	Q
2	7	Oleh Handei	Ukraine	49.020	Q
3	7	Daniil Eibog	Uzbekistan	1:01.577	ADV
	7	Brandon Kim	United States		PEN
1	8	Andrew Heo	United States	41.136	Q
2	8	Lin Xiaojun	China	41.242	Q
3	8	Jong-un Rim	South Korea	41.829	
4	8	Niall Treacy	Great Britain	56.712	

=== Quarterfinals ===
18 February 2026, 20:15 PM

Rank	Heat	Name	Country	Time	Notes
1	1	Steven Dubois	Canada	40.377	Q
2	1	Teun Boer	Netherlands	40.412	Q
3	1	Denis Nikisha	Kazakhstan	40.562	q
4	1	Andrew Heo	United States	40.724	
	1	Won-jun Moon	Hungary		PEN
1	2	Jens van 't Wout	Netherlands	40.408	Q
2	2	Shaoang Liu	China	40.461	Q
3	2	Thomas Nadalini	Italy	40.619	
4	2	Oleh Handei	Ukraine	41.164	
5	2	Denis Örs	Turkey	41.532	
1	3	William Dandjinou	Canada	40.330	Q
2	3	Pietro Sighel	Italy	40.392	Q
3	3	Maxime Laoun	Canada	40.454	q
4	3	Lin Xiaojun	China	40.638	
5	3	Daniil Eybog	Uzbekistan	1:07.497	
1	4	Melle van 't Wout	Netherlands	40.554	Q
2	4	Félix Pigeon	Poland	40.770	Q
3	4	Lorenzo Previtali	Italy	40.847	
4	4	Kazuki Yoshinaga	Japan	40.895	
5	4	Abzal Azhgaliyev	Kazakhstan	41.549	

=== Semifinals ===
18 February 2026, 20:42 PM

Rank	Heat	Name	Country	Time	Notes
1	1	William Dandjinou	Canada	40.752	QA
2	1	Melle van 't Wout	Netherlands	40.916	QA
3	1	Félix Pigeon	Poland	41.026	QB
4	1	Maxime Laoun	Canada	58.859	QB
5	1	Pietro Sighel	Italy	1:07.239	QB
1	2	Jens van 't Wout	Netherlands	40.064	QA
2	2	Steven Dubois	Canada	40.163	QA
3	2	Teun Boer	Netherlands	40.295	qA
4	2	Denis Nikisha	Kazakhstan	40.871	QB
5	2	Liu Shaoang	China	1:10.008	QB

=== Finals ===
==== Final B ====
18 February 2026, 21:24 PM

Rank	Name	Country	Time	Notes
1	Liu Shaoang	China	41.525	
2	Denis Nikisha	Kazakhstan	41.948	
3	Félix Pigeon	Poland	45.345	
4	Maxime Laoun	Canada	1:22.896	
5	Pietro Sighel	Italy	DNS	

==== Final A ====
18 February 2026, 21:29 PM

Rank	Name	Country	Time	Notes
1st place, gold medalist(s)	Steven Dubois	Canada	40.835	
2nd place, silver medalist(s)	Melle van 't Wout	Netherlands	40.912	
3rd place, bronze medalist(s)	Jens van 't Wout	Netherlands	41.908	
4	Teun Boer	Netherlands	1:05.360	
5	William Dandjinou	Canada	PEN	
