= Short-track speed skating at the 2022 Winter Olympics – Women's 1000 metres =

Women's 1000 metres at the XXIV Olympic Winter Games
- Short track speed skating
- Venue: Capital Indoor Stadium, Beijing
- Date: 9 and 11 February 2022
- Competitors: 32 from 14 nations
- Winning time: 1:28.391

Medalists
1st place, gold medalist(s)		Suzanne Schulting	Netherlands
2nd place, silver medalist(s)		Choi Min-jeong	South Korea
3rd place, bronze medalist(s)		Hanne Desmet	Belgium

The women's 1000 metres competition in short track speed skating at the 2022 Winter Olympics was held on 9 February (heats) and 11 February (finals), at the Capital Indoor Stadium in Beijing. Suzanne Schulting of the Netherlands won the gold medal and thereby successfully defended her 2018 title. In the semifinal, Schulting set the new world record. Choi Min-jeong won the silver medal, and Hanne Desmet of Belgium the bronze. Desmet's medal was the first ever Belgian medal in short track speed skating and only the seventh Belgian medal at the Winter Olympics.

The 2018 silver medalist, Kim Boutin, and the bronze medalist, Arianna Fontana, qualified as well. Schulting was the 2021 World Short Track Speed Skating champion at all distances, including 1500 m. Desmet and Courtney Sarault were the silver and bronze medalists, respectively. Many top athletes did not participate in the championship, however. Schulting was also leading the 2021–22 ISU Short Track Speed Skating World Cup at the 1000 m distance with four races completed before the Olympics, followed by Kristen Santos and Choi Min-jeong.

== Qualification ==
Countries were assigned quotas based on their performance during the 2021–22 ISU Short Track Speed Skating World Cup, with the top 32 athletes (maximum of three per country qualifying quotas. If a NOC declined a quota spot, it was distributed to the next available athlete, only if the maximum quota of 56 athletes per gender was not surpassed.

== Records ==
Prior to this competition, the existing world and Olympic records were as follows.

World record	Shim Suk-hee (KOR)	1:26.661	Calgary, Canada	21 October 2012
Olympic record	Valérie Maltais (CAN)	1:28.771	Sochi, Russia	18 February 2014

The following records were set during the competition.

Date	Round	Athlete	Country	Time	Record	Ref
9 February	Heat 2	Suzanne Schulting	Netherlands	1:27.292	OR	
11 February	Quarterfinal 1	Suzanne Schulting	Netherlands	1:26.514	WR, OR	

== Results ==
=== Heats ===
Rank	Heat	Name	Country	Time	Notes
1	1	Choi Min-jeong	South Korea	1:28.053	Q
2	1	Selma Poutsma	Netherlands	1:28.115	Q
3	1	Anna Vostrikova	ROC	1:28.290	q
4	1	Kathryn Thomson	Great Britain	1:30.037	
1	2	Suzanne Schulting	Netherlands	1:27.292	Q, OR
2	2	Han Yutong	China	1:27.401	Q
3	2	Corinne Stoddard	United States	1:27.528	q
4	2	Shione Kaminaga	Japan	1:28.465	
1	3	Qu Chunyu	China	1:30.342	Q
2	3	Xandra Velzeboer	Netherlands	1:30.454	Q
3	3	Gwendoline Daudet	France	1:31.734	
4	3	Zsófia Kónya	Hungary	No time	
1	4	Arianna Fontana	Italy	1:30.066	Q
2	4	Sumire Kikuchi	Japan	1:30.154	Q
3	4	Olga Tikhonova	Kazakhstan	1:56.438	
	4	Sofia Prosvirnova	ROC		PEN
1	5	Maame Biney	United States	1:27.859	Q
2	5	Lee Yu-bin	South Korea	1:27.862	Q
3	5	Zhang Chutong	China	1:27.910	q
4	5	Kim Boutin	Canada	No time	
1	6	Courtney Sarault	Canada	1:27.798	Q
2	6	Hanne Desmet	Belgium	1:27.836	Q
3	6	Kim A-lang	South Korea	1:28.680	
4	6	Yuki Kikuchi	Japan	1:28.764	
1	7	Natalia Maliszewska	Poland	1:29.610	Q
2	7	Ekaterina Efremenkova	ROC	1:29.734	Q
3	7	Alyson Charles	Canada	1:29.863	ADV
	7	Tifany Huot-Marchand	France		PEN
1	8	Kristen Santos	United States	1:28.237	Q
2	8	Petra Jászapáti	Hungary	1:28.392	Q
3	8	Cynthia Mascitto	Italy	1:28.471	
4	8	Kamila Stormowska	Poland	1:28.567	

=== Quarterfinals ===
Rank	Heat	Name	Country	Time	Notes
1	1	Suzanne Schulting	Netherlands	1:26.514	Q, WR
2	1	Xandra Velzeboer	Netherlands	1:26.592	Q
3	1	Corinne Stoddard	United States	1:27.912	q
4	1	Qu Chunyu	China	1:28.355	
5	1	Han Yutong	China	1:31.638	
1	2	Lee Yu-bin	South Korea	1:29.120	Q
2	2	Maame Biney	United States	1:29.225	Q
3	2	Ekaterina Efremenkova	ROC	1:29.434	
4	2	Anna Vostrikova	ROC	1:30.021	
5	2	Natalia Maliszewska	Poland	1:48.908	
1	3	Arianna Fontana	Italy	1:29.324	Q
2	3	Hanne Desmet	Belgium	1:29.388	Q
3	3	Courtney Sarault	Canada	1:29.450	
4	3	Zhang Chutong	China	1:29.755	
5	3	Sumire Kikuchi	Japan	1:37.170	
1	4	Kristen Santos	United States	1:28.393	Q
2	4	Choi Min-jeong	South Korea	1:28.722	Q
3	4	Petra Jászapáti	Hungary	1:28.786	q
4	4	Selma Poutsma	Netherlands	1:29.077	
5	4	Alyson Charles	Canada	1:30.161	

=== Semifinals ===
Rank	Heat	Name	Country	Time	Notes
1	1	Suzanne Schulting	Netherlands	1:28.108	QA
2	1	Hanne Desmet	Belgium	1:28.166	QA
3	1	Lee Yu-bin	South Korea	1:28.170	QB
4	1	Maame Biney	United States	1:28.806	QB
5	1	Petra Jászapáti	Hungary	1:28.827	QB
1	2	Kristen Santos	United States	1:26.783	QA
2	2	Arianna Fontana	Italy	1:26.811	QA
3	2	Choi Min-jeong	South Korea	1:26.850	QA
4	2	Corinne Stoddard	United States	1:27.626	QB
5	2	Xandra Velzeboer	Netherlands	1:27.777	QB

=== Finals ===
==== Final B ====
Rank	Name	Country	Time	Notes
5	Xandra Velzeboer	Netherlands	1:29.668	
6	Lee Yu-bin	South Korea	1:29.739	
7	Corinne Stoddard	United States	1:29.845	
8	Petra Jászapáti	Hungary	1:30.249	
9	Maame Biney	United States	1:30.736	

==== Final A ====
Rank	Name	Country	Time	Notes
1st place, gold medalist(s)	Suzanne Schulting	Netherlands	1:28.391	
2nd place, silver medalist(s)	Choi Min-jeong	South Korea	1:28.443	
3rd place, bronze medalist(s)	Hanne Desmet	Belgium	1:28.928	
4	Kristen Santos	United States	1:42.745	
	Arianna Fontana	Italy		PEN
