= List of Olympic records in short-track speed skating =

This is the list of current Olympic records in short track speed skating.

== Men's records ==
Men's records
Event	Time	Name	Nation	Games	Date	Ref.
500 metres	39.584	Wu Dajing	China	2018 Pyeongchang	22 February 2018	
1000 metres	1:23.042	Hwang Dae-heon	South Korea	2022 Beijing	5 February 2022	
1500 metres	2:09.213	Shaolin Sándor Liu	Hungary	2022 Beijing	9 February 2022	
5000 metre relay	6:31.971	Shaoang Liu; Shaolin Sándor Liu; Viktor Knoch; Csaba Burján	Hungary	2018 Pyeongchang	22 February 2018	

== Women's records ==
♦ denotes a performance that is also a current world record.

Women's records
Event	Time	Name	Nation	Games	Date	Ref.
500 metres	41.399 ♦	Xandra Velzeboer	Netherlands	2026 Milano Cortina	12 February 2026	
1000 metres	1:26.514	Suzanne Schulting	Netherlands	2022 Beijing	11 February 2022	
1500 metres	2:16.831	Choi Min-jeong	South Korea	2022 Beijing	16 February 2022	
3000 metre relay	4:03.409	Suzanne Schulting; Selma Poutsma; Xandra Velzeboer; Yara van Kerkhof	Netherlands	2022 Beijing	13 February 2022	

== Mixed records ==
Mixed records
Event	Time	Name	Nation	Games	Date	Ref.
2000 metre relay	2:35.537	Xandra Velzeboer; Selma Poutsma; Jens van 't Wout; Teun Boer	Netherlands	2026 Milano Cortina	10 February 2026	

== See also ==
- Short-track speed skating § World records
- List of Olympic records in speed skating
