= Short-track speed skating at the 2026 Winter Olympics – Men's 5000 metre relay =

Men´s 5000 metre relay at the XXV Olympic Winter Games
- Short-track speed skating
- Venue: Forum di Milano, Milan
- Date: 16, 20 February
- Competitors: 32 from 8 nations
- Winning time: 6:51.847

Medalists
1st place, gold medalist(s)		Jens van 't Wout; Teun Boer; Friso Emons; Melle van 't Wout	Netherlands
2nd place, silver medalist(s)		Hwang Dae-heon; Lee Jeong-min; Lee June-seo; Rim Jong-un	South Korea
3rd place, bronze medalist(s)		Pietro Sighel; Thomas Nadalini; Luca Spechenhauser; Andrea Cassinelli	Italy

The men's 5000 metre relay competition in short-track speed skating at the 2026 Winter Olympics was held on 16 (semifinals) and 20 February 2026 (finals) at the Forum di Milano in Milan. The Netherlands, represented by Jens van 't Wout, Teun Boer, Friso Emons, and Melle van 't Wout, won the event. South Korea were second and Italy third.

== Background ==
The defending champions were Canada. South Korea were the 2022 silver medalists, and Italy the bronze medalists. Before the Olympics, South Korea were leading the 2025–26 ISU Short Track World Tour men's relay standings. Canada were the 2025 World champion in men's relay.

== Qualification ==
Countries qualified for the relay competition at the Winter Olympics during the 2025–26 ISU Short Track World Tour. A total of 8 nations qualified for the event.

== Records ==
Prior to this competition, the world and Olympic records were as follows.

World record	Hungary; Csaba Burján; Cole Krueger; Shaolin Sándor Liu; Shaoang Liu	6:28.625	Calgary, Canada	4 November 2018
Olympic record	Hungary; Csaba Burján; Viktor Knoch; Shaolin Sándor Liu; Shaoang Liu	6:31.971	Pyeongchang, South Korea	22 February 2018

== Results ==
=== Semifinals ===
16 February 2026, 12:04 PM

Rank	Heat	Country	Athletes	Time	Notes
1	1	Canada	William Dandjinou; Steven Dubois; Maxime Laoun; Félix Roussel	6:54.075	QA
2	1	Italy	Andrea Cassinelli; Thomas Nadalini; Pietro Sighel; Luca Spechenhauser	6:54.454	QA
3	1	China	Shaoang Liu; Lin Xiaojun; Li Wenlong; Zhang Bohao	6:55.278	QB
4	1	Hungary	Dominik Major; Moon Won-jun; Bence Nógrádi; Dániel Tiborcz	7:11.211	QB
1	2	South Korea	Lee Jeong-min; Lee June-seo; Rim Jong-un; Shin Dong-min	6:52.708	QA
2	2	Netherlands	Teun Boer; Itzhak de Laat; Friso Emons; Jens van 't Wout	6:52.751	QA
3	2	Belgium	Adriaan Dewagtere; Stijn Desmet; Ward Pétré; Warre Van Damme	6:52.978	QB
4	2	Japan	Dan Iwasa; Shōgo Miyata; Kazuki Yoshinaga; Keita Watanabe	6:53.090	QB

=== Finals ===
==== Final B ====
20 February 2026, 21:17 PM

Rank	Country	Athletes	Time	Notes
1	China	Sun Long; Shaoang Liu; Lin Xiaojun; Zhang Bohao	6:49.894	
2	Belgium	Adriaan Dewagtere; Stijn Desmet; Ward Pétré; Warre Van Damme	6:51.672	
3	Japan	Dan Iwasa; Shōgo Miyata; Kazuki Yoshinaga; Keita Watanabe	6:52.083	
4	Hungary	Dominik Major; Moon Won-jun; Bence Nógrádi; Dániel Tiborcz	6:52.209	

==== Final A ====
20 February 2026, 21:29 PM

Rank	Country	Athletes	Time	Notes
1st place, gold medalist(s)	Netherlands	Jens van 't Wout; Teun Boer; Friso Emons; Melle van 't Wout	6:51.847	
2nd place, silver medalist(s)	South Korea	Hwang Dae-heon; Lee Jeong-min; Lee June-seo; Rim Jong-un	6:52.239	
3rd place, bronze medalist(s)	Italy	Pietro Sighel; Thomas Nadalini; Luca Spechenhauser; Andrea Cassinelli	6:52.335	
4	Canada	William Dandjinou; Steven Dubois; Félix Roussel; Maxime Laoun	6:52.425	

==== Final ranking ====
Rank	Country	Athletes	SF	FB	FA	Best Time
1st place, gold medalist(s)	Netherlands	Teun Boer; Friso Emons; Jens van 't Wout; Melle van 't Wout; Itzhak de Laat	2		1	6:51.847
2nd place, silver medalist(s)	South Korea	Hwang Dae-heon; Lee Jeong-min; Lee June-seo; Rim Jong-un; Shin Dong-min	1		2	6:52.239
3rd place, bronze medalist(s)	Italy	Pietro Sighel; Thomas Nadalini; Luca Spechenhauser; Andrea Cassinelli	2		3	6:52.335
4	Canada	William Dandjinou; Steven Dubois; Félix Roussel; Maxime Laoun	1		4	6:52.425
5	China	Shaoang Liu; Lin Xiaojun; Zhang Bohao; Sun Long; Li Wenlong	3	1		6:49.894
6	Belgium	Adriaan Dewagtere; Stijn Desmet; Ward Pétré; Warre Van Damme	3	2		6:51.672
7	Japan	Dan Iwasa; Shōgo Miyata; Kazuki Yoshinaga; Keita Watanabe	4	3		6:52.083
8	Hungary	Dominik Major; Moon Won-jun; Bence Nógrádi; Dániel Tiborcz	4	4		6:52.209
