= 2023 World Short Track Speed Skating Championships =

- Venue: Mokdong Ice Rink
- Location: Seoul, South Korea
- Dates: 10–12 March
- Competitors: 160 from 34 nations

The 2023 World Short Track Speed Skating Championships were held from 10 to 12 March 2023 in Seoul, South Korea. Seoul were originally scheduled to host the 2020 Championships, but they were cancelled due to the COVID-19 pandemic.

== Medal summary ==
=== Medal table ===
* Host nation (South Korea)

Rank	Nation	Gold	Silver	Bronze	Total
1	Netherlands	5	1	2	8
2	South Korea*	2	3	1	6
3	Italy	1	2	1	4
4	China	1	1	0	2
5	Canada	0	1	5	6
6	Belgium	0	1	0	1
Totals (6 entries)		9	9	9	27

=== Men ===
Event	Gold		Silver		Bronze	
500 m	Pietro Sighel; Italy	41.166	Steven Dubois; Canada	41.223	Jens van 't Wout; Netherlands	41.243
1000 m	Park Ji-won; South Korea	1:27.741	Stijn Desmet; Belgium	1:27.974	Steven Dubois; Canada	1:28.069
1500 m	Park Ji-won; South Korea	2:17.792	Pietro Sighel; Italy	2:17.898	Pascal Dion; Canada	2:17.986
5000 m relay	China; Li Wenlong; Lin Xiaojun; Liu Guanyi; Zhong Yuchen; Song Jiahua	7:04.412	Italy; Andrea Cassinelli; Tommaso Dotti; Pietro Sighel; Luca Spechenhauser; Thomas Nadalini	7:04.484	South Korea; Hong Kyung-hwan; Lee June-seo; Lim Yong-jin; Park Ji-won; Lee Dong-hyun	7:04.884

=== Women ===
Event	Gold		Silver		Bronze	
500 m	Xandra Velzeboer; Netherlands	41.977	Suzanne Schulting; Netherlands	42.450	Selma Poutsma; Netherlands	42.567
1000 m	Xandra Velzeboer; Netherlands	1:29.361	Choi Min-jeong; South Korea	1:29.679	Courtney Sarault; Canada	1:29.794
1500 m	Suzanne Schulting; Netherlands	2:31.349	Choi Min-jeong; South Korea	2:31.448	Kim Boutin; Canada	2:31.575
3000 m relay	Netherlands; Selma Poutsma; Suzanne Schulting; Yara van Kerkhof; Xandra Velzeboer; Michelle Velzeboer	4:09.056	South Korea; Choi Min-jeong; Kim Geon-hee; Kim Gil-li; Shim Suk-hee; Lee So-youn	4:09.151	Canada; Kim Boutin; Claudia Gagnon; Courtney Sarault; Renée Steenge; Rikki Doak	4:09.372

=== Mixed ===
Event	Gold		Silver		Bronze	
2000 m relay	Netherlands; Teun Boer; Suzanne Schulting; Jens van 't Wout; Xandra Velzeboer; Itzhak de Laat; Selma Poutsma	2:41.646	China; Gong Li; Li Wenlong; Lin Xiaojun; Zang Yize; Wang Xinran; Zhong Yuchen	2:41.821	Italy; Andrea Cassinelli; Arianna Sighel; Pietro Sighel; Arianna Valcepina; Chiara Betti	2:41.907
