= 2023 European Short Track Speed Skating Championships =

2023 European Championships
- Venue: Hala Olivia
- Location: Gdańsk, Poland
- Dates: 13–15 January

The 2023 European Short Track Speed Skating Championships were held from 13 to 15 January 2023 in Gdańsk, Poland.

== Medal summary ==
* Host nation (Poland)

Rank	Nation	Gold	Silver	Bronze	Total
1	Netherlands	6	3	1	10
2	Belgium	2	3	0	5
3	Italy	1	1	3	5
4	Hungary	0	1	1	2
4	Poland*	0	1	1	2
6	Germany	0	0	1	1
6	Latvia	0	0	1	1
6	Turkey	0	0	1	1
Totals (8 entries)		9	9	9	27

=== Men ===
Event	Gold		Silver		Bronze	
500 metres	Pietro Sighel; Italy	41.514	Jens van 't Wout; Netherlands	41.631	Reinis Bērziņš; Latvia	41.915
1000 metres	Stijn Desmet; Belgium	1:27.652	Jens van 't Wout; Netherlands	1:27.785	Furkan Akar; Turkey	1:34.780
1500 metres	Jens van 't Wout; Netherlands	2:19.858	Stijn Desmet; Belgium	2:19.876	Friso Emons; Netherlands	2:19.977
5000 metre relay	Netherlands; Itzhak de Laat; Friso Emons; Jens van 't Wout; Melle van 't Wout	7:19.783	Italy; Mattia Antonioli; Tommaso Dotti; Thomas Nadalini; Pietro Sighel; Luca Spechenhauser	7:24.210	Poland; Paweł Adamski; Łukasz Kuczyński; Michał Niewiński; Diané Sellier	7:27.891

=== Women ===
Event	Gold		Silver		Bronze	
500 metres	Suzanne Schulting; Netherlands	43.825	Natalia Maliszewska; Poland	43.938	Arianna Valcepina; Italy	44.011
1000 metres	Hanne Desmet; Belgium	1:32.443	Suzanne Schulting; Netherlands	1:32.514	Petra Jaszapati; Hungary	1:32.640
1500 metres	Suzanne Schulting; Netherlands	2:32.756	Hanne Desmet; Belgium	2:32.781	Anna Seidel; Germany	2:32.884
3000 metre relay	Netherlands; Selma Poutsma; Suzanne Schulting; Yara van Kerkhof; Xandra Velzeboer; Michelle Velzeboer	4:13.118	Hungary; Sára Bácskai; Petra Jászapáti; Zsófia Kónya; Rebeka Sziliczei-Német	4:13.355	Italy; Elisa Confortola; Gloria Ioriatti; Arianna Sighel; Arianna Valcepina; Nicole Botter Gomez	4:13.407

=== Mixed ===
Event	Gold		Silver		Bronze	
2000 metre relay	Netherlands; Itzhak de Laat; Suzanne Schulting; Jens van 't Wout; Xandra Velzeboer; Selma Poutsma; Melle van 't Wout	2:43.870	Belgium; Tineke den Dulk; Hanne Desmet; Stijn Desmet; Ward Pétré; Alexandra Danneel; Adriaan Dewagtere	2:43.920	Italy; Thomas Nadalini; Arianna Sighel; Pietro Sighel; Arianna Valcepina; Elisa Confortola; Luca Spechenhauser	2:44.117

== Participating nations ==
- Austria
- Belgium
- Bosnia and Herzegovina
- Bulgaria
- Croatia
- Czech Republic
- France
- Germany
- Great Britain
- Hungary
- Ireland
- Italy
- Latvia
- Lithuania
- Luxembourg
- Netherlands
- Norway
- Poland
- Serbia
- Slovakia
- Slovenia
- Sweden
- Switzerland
- Turkey
- Ukraine
