= 2026 European Short Track Speed Skating Championships =

Speed skating event in Tilburg, Netherlands

2026 ISU European Short Track Speed Skating Championships
- Venue: IJssportcentrum Tilburg
- Location: Tilburg, Netherlands
- Dates: 16–18 January
- Competitors: 120 from 25 nations

The 2026 European Short Track Speed Skating Championships took place from 16 to 18 January 2026 in the IJssportcentrum in Tilburg. The event is seen as a test for the 2026 Winter Olympics.

== Schedule ==
The Championships has nine events: three individual events for men and women and three team events. The schedule is:

		Fri 16	Sat 17	Sun 18
Men	500 m	H	R, QF, SF, F	
Men	1000 m	H		R, QF, SF, F
Men	1500 m	QF	R, SF, F	
Men	5000 m relay	QF	SF	F
Women	500 m	H		R, QF, SF, F
Women	1000 m	H	R, QF, SF, F	
Women	1500 m	QF		R, SF, F
Women	3000 m relay		SF, F	
Mixed	2000 m relay	QF	SF	F

== Participating nations ==
The final entry list totalled 120 athletes from 25 countries.

- Austria (2)
- Belgium (5)
- Bosnia and Herzegovina (1)
- Bulgaria (4)
- Croatia (4)
- Czech Republic (5)
- France (9)
- Germany (6)
- Great Britain (6)
- Hungary (10)
- Ireland (2)
- Italy (10)
- Latvia (5)
- Lithuania (1)
- Luxembourg (1)
- Netherlands (10)
- Norway (6)
- Poland (10)
- Romania (1)
- Serbia (1)
- Slovakia (3)
- Slovenia (1)
- Switzerland (2)
- Turkey (5)
- Ukraine (9)

== Medal summary ==
=== Medal table ===
* Host nation (Netherlands)

Rank	Nation	Gold	Silver	Bronze	Total
1	Netherlands*	7	5	2	14
2	Italy	2	2	4	8
3	Poland	0	1	1	2
4	Latvia	0	1	0	1
5	Hungary	0	0	2	2
Totals (5 entries)		9	9	9	27

=== Men ===
Event	Gold		Silver		Bronze	
500 metres	Jens van 't Wout; Netherlands	40.848	Teun Boer; Netherlands	40.936	Melle van 't Wout; Netherlands	41.046
1000 metres	Jens van 't Wout; Netherlands	1:24.470	Luca Spechenhauser; Italy	1:24.928	Thomas Nadalini; Italy	1:24.990
1500 metres	Jens van 't Wout; Netherlands	2:28.011	Roberts Krūzbergs; Latvia	2:28.126	Thomas Nadalini; Italy	2:28.321
5000 metre relay	Italy; Andrea Cassinelli; Thomas Nadalini; Pietro Sighel; Luca Spechenhauser; Lorenzo Previtali	6:47.817	Netherlands; Teun Boer; Itzhak de Laat; Friso Emons; Jens van 't Wout; Melle van 't Wout	6:48.185	Poland; Łukasz Kuczyński; Michał Niewiński; Félix Pigeon; Diané Sellier; Neithan Thomas	6:51.085

=== Women ===
Event	Gold		Silver		Bronze	
500 metres	Xandra Velzeboer; Netherlands	41.859	Michelle Velzeboer; Netherlands	42.009	Selma Poutsma; Netherlands	42.020
1000 metres	Xandra Velzeboer; Netherlands	1:29.394	Michelle Velzeboer; Netherlands	1:29.471	Elisa Confortola; Italy	1:29.499
1500 metres	Arianna Fontana; Italy	2:42.479	Zoë Deltrap; Netherlands	2:42.718	Arianna Sighel; Italy	2:42.762
3000 metre relay	Netherlands; Zoë Deltrap; Selma Poutsma; Michelle Velzeboer; Xandra Velzeboer; Diede van Oorschot	4:12.126	Italy; Chiara Betti; Elisa Confortola; Arianna Fontana; Martina Valcepina; Arianna Sighel	4:12.596	Hungary; Sára Bácskai; Maja Somodi; Rebeka Sziliczei-Német; Diána Laura Végi	4:36.126

=== Mixed ===
Event	Gold		Silver		Bronze	
2000 metre relay	Netherlands; Teun Boer; Jens van 't Wout; Michelle Velzeboer; Xandra Velzeboer; Selma Poutsma; Melle van 't Wout	2:37.896	Poland; Natalia Maliszewska; Michał Niewiński; Félix Pigeon; Gabriela Topolska; Kamila Sellier; Diané Sellier	2:38.342	Hungary; Moon Won-jun; Bence Nógrádi; Maja Somodi; Diána Laura Végi; Dániel Tiborcz	2:38.828
