= Łukasz Kuczyński =

Polish short track speed skater

Personal information
- Born: 23 June 1999 (age 27) Sokółka, Poland
- Home town: Białystok, Poland
- Height: 171 cm (5 ft 7 in)

Sport
- Country: Poland
- Sport: Short track speed skating
Medal record
Men's short-track speed skating
Representing Poland
World Championships
Bronze medal – third place	2024 Rotterdam	5000 m relay
Bronze medal – third place	2025 Beijing	2000 m mixed relay
European Championships
Silver medal – second place	2024 Gdańsk	2000 m mixed relay
Silver medal – second place	2025 Dresden	5000 m relay
Bronze medal – third place	2023 Gdańsk	5000 m relay
Bronze medal – third place	2024 Gdańsk	5000 m relay
Bronze medal – third place	2025 Dresden	2000 m mixed relay
Bronze medal – third place	2026 Tilburg	5000 m relay

Łukasz Kuczynski (born June 1999) is a Polish short track speed skater. He competed at the 2022 Winter Olympics, in Mixed 2000 metre relay. He was born in Sokółka. Lukasz’s Olympic debut was at the Winter Olympics 2022 in Beijing
