= Warre Van Damme =

Belgian speed skater (born 2003)

Personal information
- Born: 14 January 2003 (age 23) Bruges, Belgium

Sport
- Country: Belgium
- Sport: Short-track speed skating
Medal record
Men's short-track speed skating
Representing Belgium
European Championships
Silver medal – second place	2024 Gdańsk	5000 m relay
Bronze medal – third place	2025 Dresden	5000 m relay

Warre Van Damme (born 14 January 2003) is a Belgian short-track speed skater. He represented Belgium at the 2026 Winter Olympics.

== Career ==
Van Damme competed at the 2025 European Short Track Speed Skating Championships and won a bronze medal in the 5000 metre relay.

In January 2026, he was selected to represent Belgium at the 2026 Winter Olympics. He competed in the 5000 metre relay.
