= Adriaan Dewagtere =

Belgian speed skater (born 2001)

Personal information
- Born: 4 July 2001 (age 25) Ghent, Belgium

Sport
- Country: Belgium
- Sport: Short-track speed skating
- Club: Shorttrackclub Kristallijn Gent
Medal record
Men's short-track speed skating
Representing Belgium
World Championships
| Bronze medal – third place | 2026 Montreal | 2000 m mixed relay |
European Championships
| Silver medal – second place | 2023 Gdańsk | 2000 m mixed relay |
| Silver medal – second place | 2024 Gdańsk | 5000 m relay |
| Bronze medal – third place | 2024 Gdańsk | 2000 m mixed relay |

Adriaan Dewagtere (born 4 July 2001) is a Belgian short-track speed skater. He represented Belgium at the 2026 Winter Olympics.

== Personal life ==
Dewagtere, the son of a police officer and an interior architect, grew up in Lochristi, Belgium where he attended the local primary school. Subsequently, he studied electromechanics and electricity at “De Brug” and Campus Glorieux (EDUGO) in Oostakker, Belgium. After graduation, he postulated for and was selected to become a member of the Belgian Armed Forces's topsportprogram where 30 young talents receive a lifeline through the army to live as professional athletes and hopefully rise to the world elite.

== Career ==
In January 2026, Dewagtere was selected to represent Belgium at the 2026 Winter Olympics. He competed in the 5000 metre relay.
