= Short-track speed skating at the 2017 European Youth Olympic Winter Festival =

Short track speed skating at the European Youth Olympic Winter Festival is held at the Erzurum Ice Skating Arena in Erzurum, Turkey from 15 to 17 February 2017.

== Medal table ==
Rank	Nation	Gold	Silver	Bronze	Total
1	Russia (RUS)	3	3	1	7
2	Poland (POL)	1	1	1	3
3	Luxembourg (LUX)	1	1	0	2
4	France (FRA)	1	0	1	2
5	Lithuania (LTU)	1	0	0	1
6	Netherlands (NED)	0	1	1	2
7	Turkey (TUR)	0	1	0	1
8	Italy (ITA)	0	0	3	3
Totals (8 entries)		7	7	7	21

== Results ==
=== Boys events ===
Event	Gold		Silver		Bronze	
1500m	Peter Murphy (LUX)	2:24.536	Konstantin Ivliev (RUS)	2:24.712 +0.176	Luca Spechenhauser (ITA)	2:24.956 +0.420
1000m	Diané Sellier (FRA)	1:35.643	Hazar Karagöl (TUR)	1:35.854 +0.211	Aleksei Simakin (RUS)	1:45.728 +10.085
500m	Salvijus Ramanauskas (LTU)	43.242	Peter Murphy (LUX)	43.414 +0.172	Diané Sellier (FRA)	43.703 +0.461

=== Ladies events ===
Event	Gold		Silver		Bronze	
1500m	Vera Rasskazova (RUS)	2:35.111	Sofya Boytsova (RUS)	2:35.255 +0.144	Melissa Tunno (ITA)	2:35.411 +0.300
1000m	Kamila Stormowska (POL)	1:44.485	Vera Rasskazova (RUS)	1:44.537 +0.052	Patrycja Markiewicz (POL)	1:44.784 +0.299
500m	Vera Rasskazova (RUS)	45.716	Georgie Dalrymple (NED)	55.951 +10.235	Melissa Tunno (ITA)	56.446 +10.730

=== Mixed events ===
Event	Gold		Silver		Bronze	
Relay	Russia; Konstantin Ivliev; Aleksei Simakin; Sofya Boytsova; Vera Rasskazova	4:22.578	Poland; Jan Bogdanowicz; Krystian Giszka; Patrycja Markiewicz; Kamila Stormowska	4:24.843 +2.265	Netherlands; Hugo Bosma; Melle van 't Wout; Georgie Dalrymple; Sara van Zuijlen	4:25.880 +3.302
