= 2024 European Short Track Speed Skating Championships =

2024 European Championships
- Venue: Hala Olivia
- Location: Gdańsk, Poland
- Dates: 12–14 January

The 2024 European Short Track Speed Skating Championships were held from 12 to 14 January 2024 in Gdańsk, Poland.

== Medal summary ==
* Host nation (Poland)

Rank	Nation	Gold	Silver	Bronze	Total
1	Netherlands	4	4	2	10
2	Italy	4	2	0	6
3	Belgium	1	1	4	6
4	Poland*	0	1	1	2
5	Great Britain	0	1	0	1
6	France	0	0	1	1
6	Hungary	0	0	1	1
Totals (7 entries)		9	9	9	27

=== Men ===
Event	Gold		Silver		Bronze	
500 metres	Pietro Sighel; Italy	41.428	Teun Boer; Netherlands	41.512	Stijn Desmet; Belgium	41.623
1000 metres	Pietro Sighel; Italy	1:26.008	Niall Treacy; Great Britain	1:26.111	Stijn Desmet; Belgium	1:26.151
1500 metres	Pietro Sighel; Italy	2:21.555	Friso Emons; Netherlands	2:21.583	Itzhak de Laat; Netherlands	2:21.623
5000 metre relay	Netherlands; Teun Boer; Itzhak de Laat; Friso Emons; Kay Huisman	7:24.370	Belgium; Stijn Desmet; Adriaan Dewagtere; Ward Pétré; Warre Van Damme; Enzo Proost	7:24.393	Poland; Łukasz Kuczyński; Michał Niewiński; Félix Pigeon; Diané Sellier	7:30.056

=== Women ===
Event	Gold		Silver		Bronze	
500 metres	Xandra Velzeboer; Netherlands	42.587	Selma Poutsma; Netherlands	42.734	Hanne Desmet; Belgium	42.825
1000 metres	Hanne Desmet; Belgium	1:33.675	Selma Poutsma; Netherlands	1:34.293	Xandra Velzeboer; Netherlands	1:34.453
1500 metres	Elisa Confortola; Italy	2:45.511	Gloria Ioriatti; Italy	2:45.514	Rebeka Sziliczei-Német; Hungary	2:46.890
3000 metre relay	Netherlands; Selma Poutsma; Yara van Kerkhof; Diede van Oorschot; Xandra Velzeboer	4:14.234	Italy; Chiara Betti; Elisa Confortola; Gloria Ioriatti; Arianna Sighel; Katia Filippi	4:14.426	France; Bérénice Comby; Gwendoline Daudet; Aurélie Lévêque; Cloé Ollivier	4:18.934

=== Mixed ===
Event	Gold		Silver		Bronze	
2000 metre relay	Netherlands; Teun Boer; Kay Huisman; Selma Poutsma; Xandra Velzeboer; Yara van Kerkhof	2:41.376	Poland; Nikola Mazur; Michał Niewiński; Diané Sellier; Kamila Stormowska; Łukasz Kuczyński; Gabriela Topolska	2:41.385	Belgium; Tineke den Dulk; Hanne Desmet; Stijn Desmet; Adriaan Dewagtere; Ward Pétré	2:41.474
