= Hanne Desmet =

Belgian speed skater (born 1996)

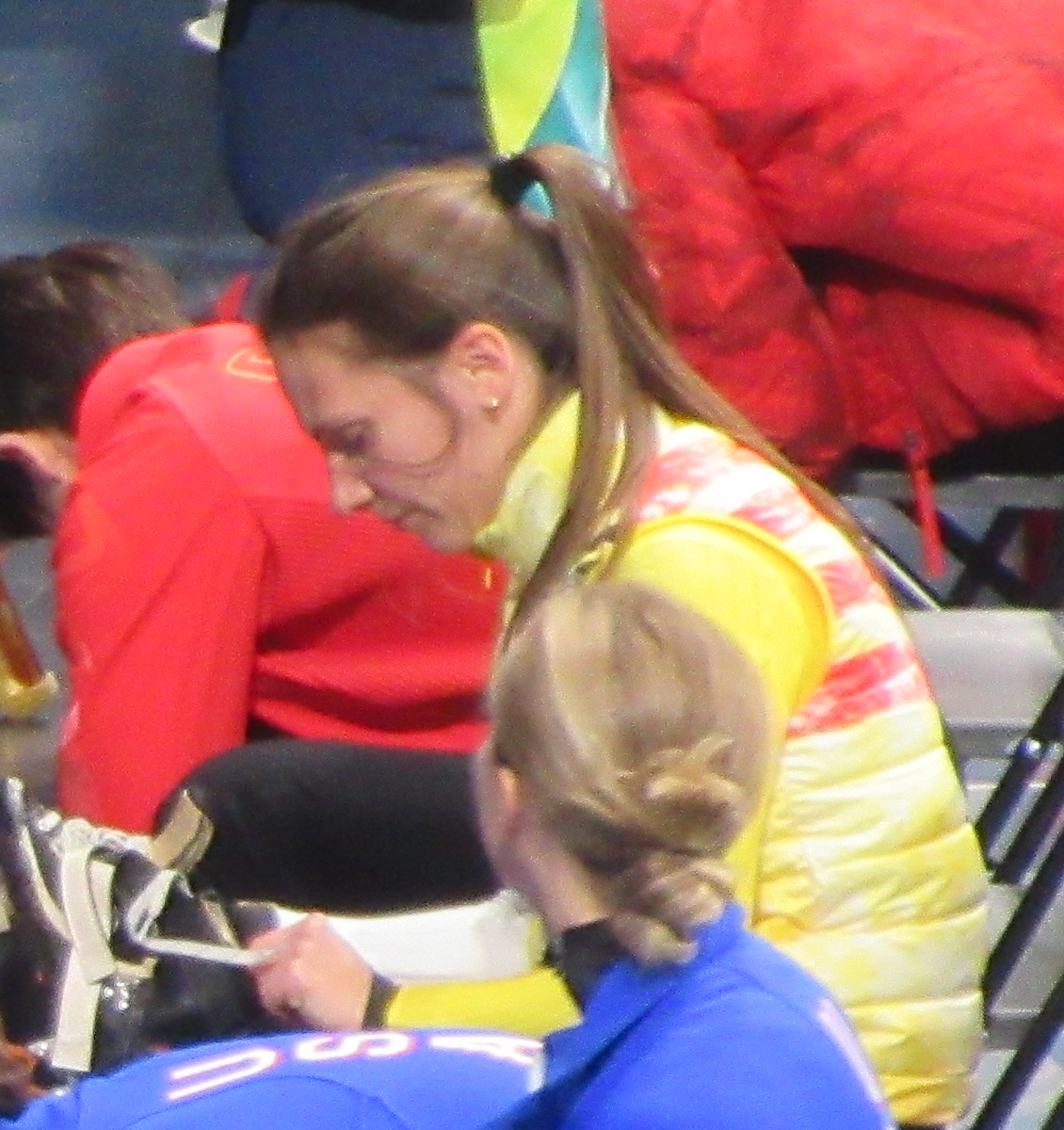
- Desmet at the 2026 Winter Olympics

Personal information
- Nationality: Belgian
- Born: 26 October 1996 (age 29) Wilrijk, Belgium

Sport
- Country: Belgium
- Sport: Short track speed skating
Medal record
Women's short-track speed skating
Representing Belgium
Olympic Games
Bronze medal – third place	2022 Beijing	1000 m
Bronze medal – third place	2026 Milano Cortina	Mixed 2000 m relay
World Championships
Gold medal – first place	2025 Beijing	1000 m
Silver medal – second place	2021 Dordrecht	1000 m
Bronze medal – third place	2026 Montreal	2000 m mixed relay
European Championships
Gold medal – first place	2023 Gdańsk	1000 m
Gold medal – first place	2024 Gdańsk	1000 m
Silver medal – second place	2023 Gdańsk	1500 m
Silver medal – second place	2023 Gdańsk	2000 m mixed relay
Bronze medal – third place	2024 Gdańsk	500 m
Bronze medal – third place	2024 Gdańsk	2000 m mixed relay

Hanne Desmet (born 26 October 1996) is a Belgian short track speed skater.

In the 1000 m event, she is the 2022 Winter Olympics bronze medalist, 2025 World Champion, and two-time European champion (2023, 2024). In the mixed relay, she is a 2026 Winter Olympics bronze medalist and two-time European medalist.

== Biography ==
Desmet was born in Wilrijk, lives in Mechelen, and is the older sister of short track speed skater Stijn Desmet. When Stijn was scouted by Pieter Gysel, Desmet started short track speed herself. Her partner is her coach and retired US long-track speed skater Joey Mantia.

Desmet is a three-time Belgian all-round champion, and in 2018, she became this by winning all individual distances. Moreover, she holds the Belgian records for all distances. At the 2019 European Championships, she took second place in the unofficial 3000m distance.

Desmet took silver in the 1000 meters at the 2021 World Short Track Speed Skating Championships. On 11 February 2022, Desmet took a historic bronze medal in the Women's 1000 metres at the 2022 Winter Olympics in Beijing, becoming the first Belgian woman to win a medal at a Winter Olympic Games in an individual event.

In March 2025, she won the gold medal in the 1000 metres at the 2025 World Short Track Speed Skating Championships in Beijing, China. In doing so, she became the first Belgian women skating world champion since Micheline Lannoy won golds in the pairs at the 1947 and 1948 World Figure Skating Championships together with her partner Pierre Baugniet, and the first in a speed skating event.

In February 2026, she became the first Belgian woman to have won two Winter Olympics medals, winning the bronze medal with the Belgian team, which also included her brother, in the mixed 2000 metre relay short-track speed skating at the 2026 Winter Olympics in Milano and Cortina d'Ampezzo, Italy, adding to the bronze medal she won four years before. A month later the Belgian mixed relay team with Desmet and her brother took another bronze medal on a world stage coming in third in the 2000 m relay at the 2026 World Short Track Speed Skating Championships in Montreal, Canada.
