= Teun Boer =

Dutch speed skater (born 2001)

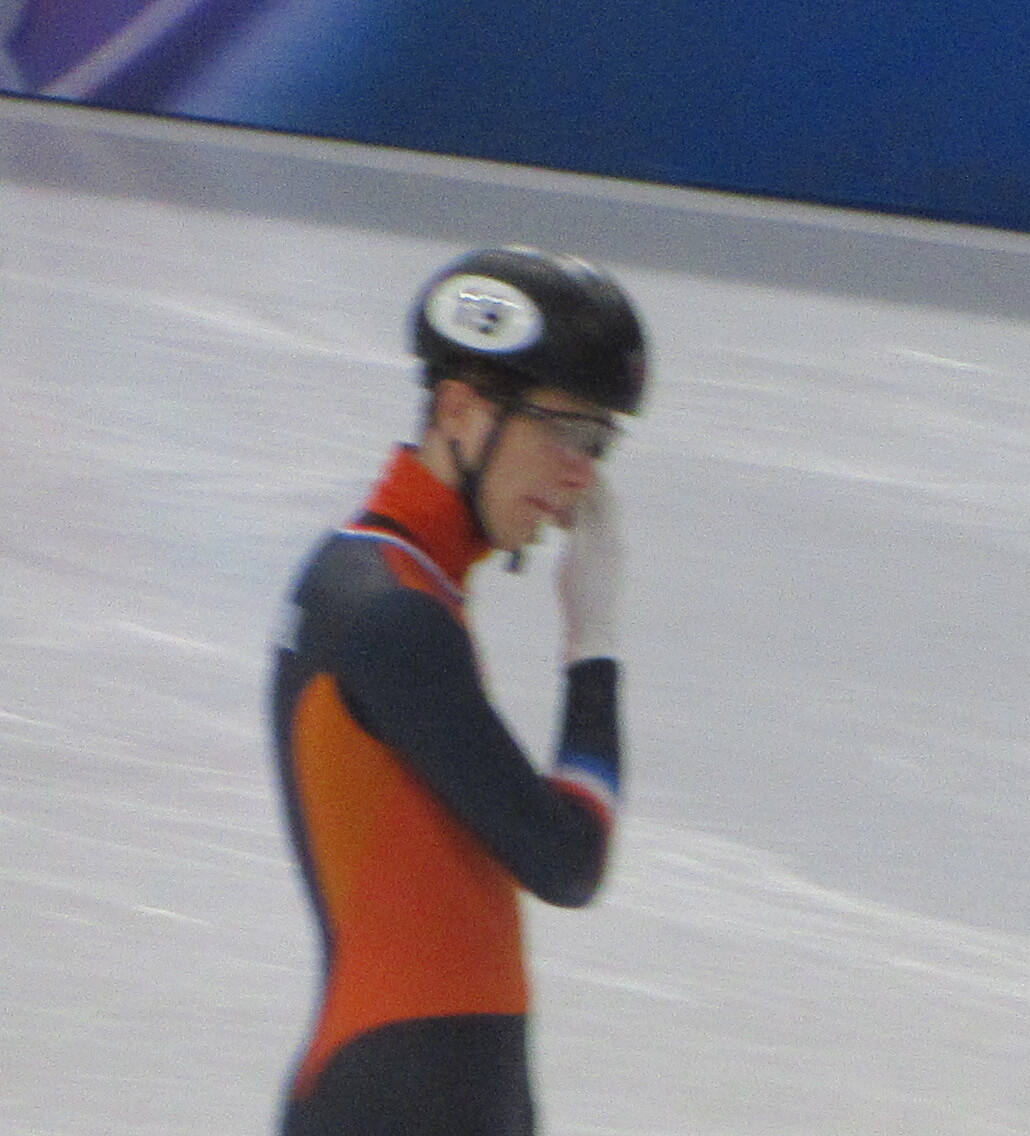
- Boer at the 2026 Winter Olympics

Personal information
- Born: 5 May 2001 (age 25) Nijmegen, Netherlands

Sport
- Country: Netherlands
- Sport: Short-track speed skating
- Club: RTC Noord Shorttrack
Medal record
Men's short-track speed skating
Representing the Netherlands
Olympic Games
Gold medal – first place	2026 Milano Cortina	5000 m relay
World Championships
Gold medal – first place	2023 Seoul	2000 m mixed relay
European Championships
Gold medal – first place	2024 Gdańsk	5000 m relay
Gold medal – first place	2024 Gdańsk	2000m mixed relay
Gold medal – first place	2026 Tilburg	2000m mixed relay
Silver medal – second place	2024 Gdańsk	500 m
Silver medal – second place	2025 Dresden	2000 m mixed relay
Silver medal – second place	2026 Tilburg	5000 m relay
Silver medal – second place	2026 Tilburg	500 m

Teun Boer (born 5 May 2001) is a Dutch short-track speed skater. At the 2026 Winter Olympics, he won a gold medal in the 5000 m relay. He won the gold medal with the mixed relay team at the 2023 World Championships.

== Career ==
Boer joined in 2017 the Regionaal Talentencentrum (RTC) in Dordrecht, a training facility for young talents. Three years later, he moved to the RTC in Heerenveen and enrolled at the Johan Cruyff Academy of the Hanze University of Applied Sciences.

He made his international debut at the 2020 World Junior Short-track Championships in Bormio. In 2021 he joined the national senior short-track speed skating team. Boer was part of the Dutch team with Suzanne Schulting, Xandra Velzeboer and Jens van ´t Wout that won the 2000 metre relay race at the 2023 World Championships. In 2025 and 2026 he won silver at the European Championships 500m race. Boer represented the Netherlands at the 2026 Winter Olympics.
