= Lorenzo Previtali =

Italian speed skater (born 2005)

Personal information
- Born: 18 July 2005 (age 20) Merate, Italy

Sport
- Country: Italy
- Sport: Short-track speed skating
Medal record
Men's short-track speed skating
Representing Italy
World Championships
Bronze medal – third place	2026 Montreal	5000 m relay
European Championships
Gold medal – first place	2025 Dresden	5000 m relay
Gold medal – first place	2026 Tilburg	5000 m relay
World Junior Championships
Gold medal – first place	2022 Gdańsk	3000 m

Lorenzo Previtali (born 18 July 2005) is an Italian short-track speed skater. He represented Italy at the 2026 Winter Olympics.

== Career ==
In January 2026, he represented Italy at the 2026 European Short Track Speed Skating Championships and won a gold medal in the 5000 metre relay.

He was selected to represent Italy at the 2026 Winter Olympics.
