= Elisa Confortola =

Italian speed skater (born 2002)

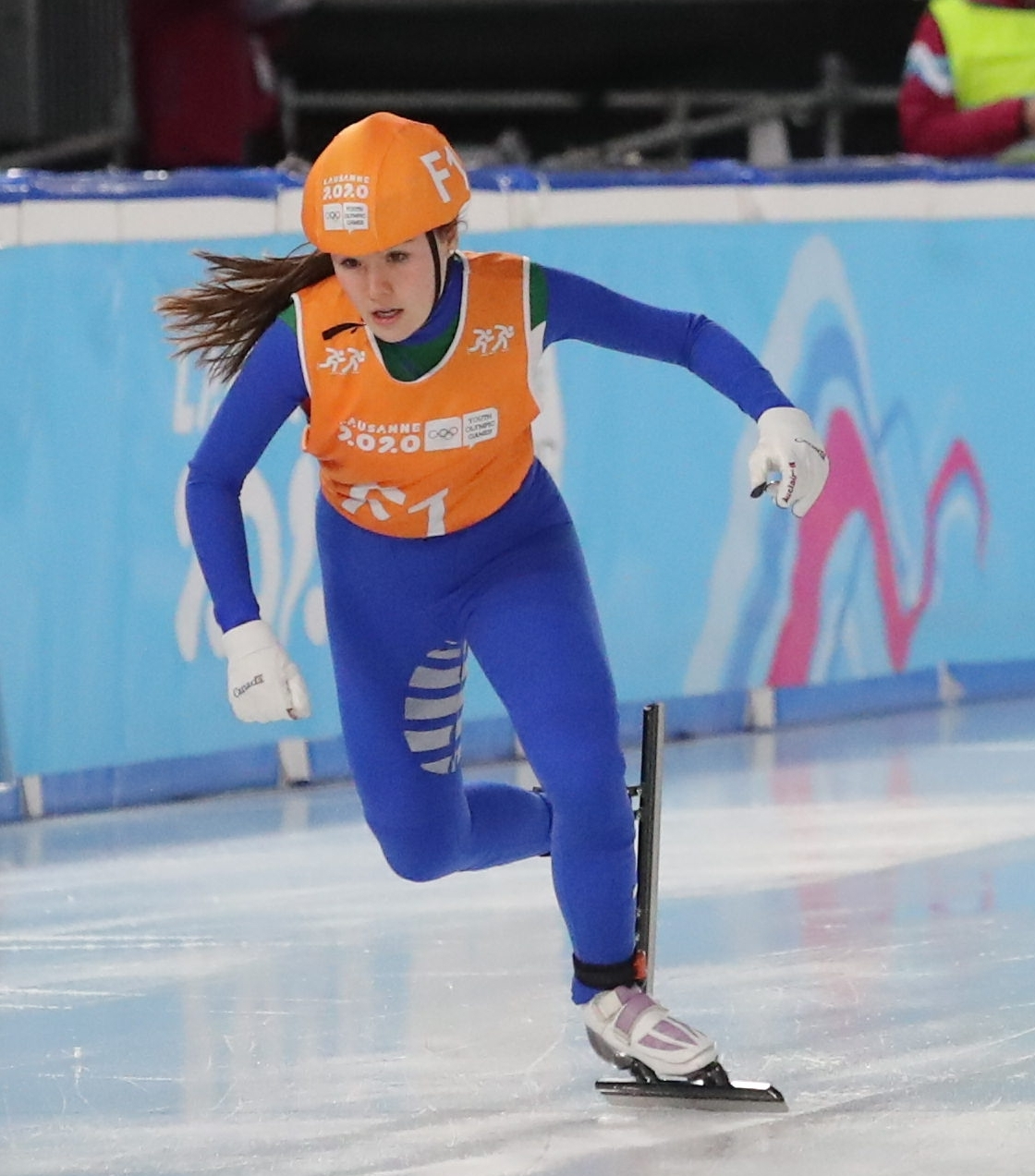
- Confortola at the 2020 Youth Olympics

Personal information
- Born: 2 April 2002 (age 24) Sondalo, Italy

Sport
- Country: Italy
- Sport: Short track speed skating
- Club: Gruppo Sportivo Fiamme Oro
Medal record
Women's short track speed skating
Representing Italy
Olympic Games
Gold medal – first place	2026 Milano Cortina	2000 m mixed relay
Silver medal – second place	2026 Milano Cortina	3000 m relay
World Championships
Gold medal – first place	2026 Montreal	2000 m mixed relay
Silver medal – second place	2025 Beijing	2000 m mixed relay
Silver medal – second place	2026 Montreal	3000 m relay
Bronze medal – third place	2026 Montreal	1000 m
European Championships
Gold medal – first place	2024 Gdansk	1500 m
Gold medal – first place	2025 Dresden	3000 m relay
Silver medal – second place	2024 Gdansk	3000 m relay
Silver medal – second place	2026 Tilburg	3000 m relay
Bronze medal – third place	2023 Gdansk	3000 m relay
Bronze medal – third place	2023 Gdansk	2000 m mixed relay
Bronze medal – third place	2025 Dresden	1000 m
Bronze medal – third place	2025 Dresden	1500 m
Bronze medal – third place	2026 Tilburg	1000 m
World Junior Championships
Bronze medal – third place	2018 Tomaszow Mazowiecki	3000 m relay
Bronze medal – third place	2019 Montreal	3000 m relay
European Youth Olympics
Gold medal – first place	2019 Sarajevo	1500 m

Elisa Confortola (born 2 April 2002) is an Italian short-track speed skater. Confortola is the 2024 and 2025 European Champion over 1500 metres. With the Italian mixed relay team she won the silver medal at the 2025 World Championships and the gold medal at the 2026 Winter Olympics.

== Career ==
=== Junior ===
Confortola started competitive speed skating at the age of 12 on the ice rink in Bormio, trained by Nicola Rodigari. She represented Italy at the 2018 World Junior Championships, obtaining the bronze medal at the women's relay race. In 2019, team Italy with Confortola again won third place. At the 2019 European Youth Olympics in Sarajevo, Confortola won an individual gold medal at the 1500m race.

=== Senior ===
Confortola joined Gruppo Sportivo Fiamme Oro and represented Italy at the European Championships from 2023 to 2026, obtaining the individual gold medal in 2024 at the 1500 metre race. Confortola was recognized with the Giulio Onesti award for outstanding contribution to Italian sports. In 2025 she was part of team Italy that won the women's relay race.

At the 2025 World Championships, Confortola was part of team Italy that won the silver medal at the mixed team relay race. She represents Italy at the 2026 Winter Olympics. Confortola was part of the Italian mixed relay team that won gold at the 2026 Winter Olympics.

== See also ==
- Italian sportswomen multiple medalists at Olympics and World Championships
