= 2021 World Short Track Speed Skating Championships =

International speed skating competition

- Venue: Optisport Sportboulevard Dordrecht
- Location: Dordrecht, Netherlands
- Dates: 5–7 March

The 2021 World Short Track Speed Skating Championships were held from 5 to 7 March 2021 in Dordrecht, Netherlands.

== Criticism and controversies ==
Many prominent countries didn’t attend or boycotted the world championship for various reasons, some related to the COVID-19 pandemic, such as Japan, China and South Korea. The Netherlands, Italy, France, Hungary and Russia (as Russian Skating Union) were the only countries with all their top skaters and roster, hence raising the question of the validity of this world championship results. Some heats in preliminary rounds were misbalanced and tended to favour athletes of countries who were put in the same or easiest heats like Netherlands and Italy.

Many elite athletes from last year World Cup standings were missing and some countries were limited to only two skaters per gender instead of usual three despite lack of entries. Some countries such as Canada and the United States entered mostly developmental skaters because of lack of training available for their skaters. Because those athletes were not ranked in the previous last year world cup rankings, they were put in tougher heats in the preliminary rounds. The lack of training of North American countries has also been criticized. European countries had significant advantages as they have previous possibilities and opportunities to compete, notably in European Championships, unlike North American countries. The disparity of the control measures of COVID-19 by the different federations in this year lead to a misbalance in level of field’s performances.

== Russia doping ban ==
On 9 December 2019, the World Anti-Doping Agency (WADA) banned Russia from all international sport for a period of four years, after the Russian government was found to have tampered with laboratory data that it provided to WADA in January 2019 as a condition of the Russian Anti-Doping Agency being reinstated. As a result of the ban, WADA plans to allow individually cleared Russian athletes to take part in the 2021–2022 World Championships and 2022 Winter Olympics under a neutral banner, as instigated at the 2018 Winter Olympics, but they will not be permitted to compete in team sports. The title of the neutral banner has yet to be determined; WADA Compliance Review Committee head Jonathan Taylor stated that the IOC would not be able to use "Olympic Athletes from Russia" (OAR) as it did in 2018, emphasizing that neutral athletes cannot be portrayed as representing a specific country. Russia later filed an appeal to the Court of Arbitration for Sport (CAS) against the WADA decision. The Court of Arbitration for Sport, on review of Russia's appeal of its case from WADA, ruled on December 17, 2020 to reduce the penalty that WADA had placed. Instead of banning Russia from sporting events, the ruling allowed Russia to participate at the Olympics and other international events, but for a period of two years, the team cannot use the Russian name, flag, or anthem and must present themselves as "Neutral Athlete" or "Neutral Team". The ruling does allow for team uniforms to display "Russia" on the uniform as well as the use of the Russian flag colors within the uniform's design, although the name should be up to equal predominance as the "Neutral Athlete/Team" designation.

== Schedule ==
All times are local (UTC+1).

Date	Time	Event
5 March	10:00	Qualifying
5 March	16:00	Qualifying
6 March	13:47	1500 m women
6 March	13:47	1500 m men
6 March	13:47	500 m women
6 March	13:47	500 m men
7 March	14:02	1000 m women
7 March	14:02	1000 m men
7 March	14:02	3000 m women
7 March	14:02	3000 m men
7 March	14:02	3000 m relay women
7 March	14:02	5000 m relay men

== Medal summary ==
=== Medal table ===
* Host nation (Netherlands)

Rank	Nation	Gold	Silver	Bronze	Total
1	Netherlands*	6	1	2	9
2	Hungary	3	3	0	6
3	Canada	1	2	1	4
4	Italy	0	1	5	6
5	Russian Skating Union	0	1	2	3
6	Belgium	0	1	0	1
6	France	0	1	0	1
Totals (7 entries)		10	10	10	30

=== Men ===
Event	Gold		Silver		Bronze	
Overall	Shaoang Liu; Hungary	60 pts	Shaolin Sándor Liu; Hungary	55 pts	Semion Elistratov; Russian Skating Union	44 pts
500 m	Shaoang Liu; Hungary	40.524	Semion Elistratov; Russian Skating Union	40.603	Pietro Sighel; Italy	40.673
1000 m	Shaolin Sándor Liu; Hungary	1:25.901	Shaoang Liu; Hungary	1:26.000	Pietro Sighel; Italy	1:26.083
1500 m	Charles Hamelin; Canada	2:18.143	Itzhak de Laat; Netherlands	2:18.202	Semion Elistratov; Russian Skating Union	2:18.296
5000 m relay	Netherlands; Daan Breeuwsma; Itzhak de Laat; Sjinkie Knegt; Jens van 't Wout	6:46.161	Hungary; Csaba Burján; John-Henry Krueger; Shaoang Liu; Shaolin Sándor Liu; Alex Varnyú	6:55.809	Italy; Yuri Confortola; Tommaso Dotti; Pietro Sighel; Luca Spechenhauser	6:56.554

=== Women ===
Event	Gold		Silver		Bronze	
Overall	Suzanne Schulting; Netherlands	136 pts	Courtney Sarault; Canada	58 pts	Arianna Fontana; Italy	39 pts
500 m	Suzanne Schulting; Netherlands	42.661	Arianna Fontana; Italy	42.719	Selma Poutsma; Netherlands	42.850
1000 m	Suzanne Schulting; Netherlands	1:26.854	Hanne Desmet; Belgium	1:26.993	Courtney Sarault; Canada	1:27.470
1500 m	Suzanne Schulting; Netherlands	2:36.884	Courtney Sarault; Canada	2:37.089	Xandra Velzeboer; Netherlands	2:37.109
3000 m relay	Netherlands; Selma Poutsma; Suzanne Schulting; Yara van Kerkhof; Xandra Velzeboer; Rianne de Vries	4:08.024	France; Gwendoline Daudet; Tifany Huot-Marchand; Aurélie Lévêque; Aurélie Monvoisin	4:10.267	Italy; Arianna Fontana; Cynthia Mascitto; Arianna Sighel; Martina Valcepina; Arianna Valcepina	4:17.631
