= Bence Nógrádi =

Hungarian speed skater (born 2002)

Personal information
- Born: 29 July 2002 (age 23) Orosháza, Hungary
- Height: 1.75 m (5 ft 9 in)

Sport
- Country: Hungary
- Sport: Short-track speed skating
- Club: Ferencvarosi Torna Club
Medal record
Men's short-track speed skating
Representing Hungary
European Championships
Bronze medal – third place	2026 Tilburg	2000 m mixed relay
World Junior Championships
Silver medal – second place	2022 Gdańsk	500 m
Silver medal – second place	2022 Gdańsk	3000 m relay

Bence Nógrádi (born 29 July 2002) is a Hungarian short-track speed skater. He represented Hungary at the 2022 and 2026 Winter Olympics.

== Career ==
Nógrádi represented Hungary at the 2022 Winter Olympics in the 5000 metre relay and advanced to the B Final, finishing in sixth place.

In January 2026, Nógrádi competed at the 2026 European Short Track Speed Skating Championships and won a bronze medal in the 2000 metre mixed relay. He was selected to represent Hungary at the 2026 Winter Olympics, and served as flagbearer during the 2026 Winter Olympics Parade of Nations. He competed in the mixed 2000 metre relay and was eliminated in the quarterfinals.
