= Stijn Desmet =

Belgian speed skater (born 1998)

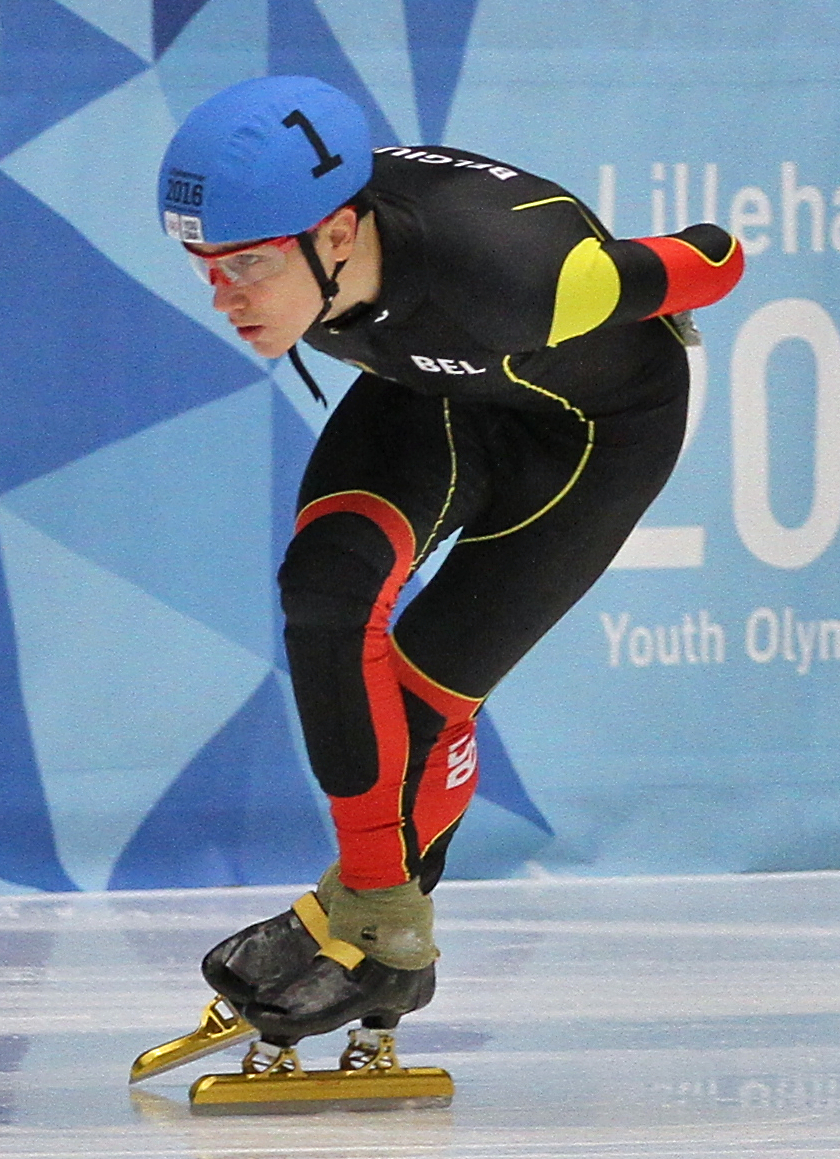
- Desmet in 2016

Personal information
- Nationality: Belgian
- Born: 10 April 1998 (age 28) Duffel, Belgium

Sport
- Country: Belgium
- Sport: Short track speed skating
- Club: IRTA
Medal record
Men's and mixed short-track speed skating
Representing Belgium
Olympic Games
Bronze medal – third place	2026 Milano Cortina	2000 m mixed relay
World Championships
Silver medal – second place	2023 Seoul	1000 m
Silver medal – second place	2025 Beijing	1500 m
Bronze medal – third place	2022 Montreal	500 m
Bronze medal – third place	2022 Montreal	1500 m
Bronze medal – third place	2026 Montreal	1500 m
Bronze medal – third place	2026 Montreal	2000 m mixed relay
European Championships
Gold medal – first place	2023 Gdańsk	1000 m
Silver medal – second place	2023 Gdańsk	1500 m
Silver medal – second place	2023 Gdańsk	2000 m mixed relay
Silver medal – second place	2024 Gdańsk	5000 m relay
Silver medal – second place	2025 Dresden	1500 m
Bronze medal – third place	2024 Gdańsk	500 m
Bronze medal – third place	2024 Gdańsk	1000 m
Bronze medal – third place	2024 Gdańsk	2000 m mixed relay
Bronze medal – third place	2025 Dresden	5000 m relay
Representing Mixed-NOCs
Winter Youth Olympics
Gold medal – first place	2016 Lillehammer	Mixed team relay

Stijn Desmet (born 10 April 1998) is a Belgian olympic medal winning short track speed skater.

== Biography ==
Desmet was born in Duffel, lives in Mechelen, and is the younger brother of short track speed skater and Olympic bronze medalist Hanne Desmet. Together with her he won an Olympic bronze medal at the 2026 Winter Olympics as part of the Belgian mixed relay shorttrack team.

Desmet started short track speed skating at a club in Wilrijk at the age of 10. In 2012, he was scouted by the Belgian short track national team coach Pieter Gysel to participate in the Sport Vlaanderen supported project "Be Gold" to train talented youth professionally in Hasselt, with the Winter Olympics as the main goal.

Desmet is the Belgian record holder in the 500 meters. At the 2016 Winter Youth Olympics in Lillehammer, Norway, he won a gold medal in the mixed relay event in an international team, alongside Desmet consisting of Quentin Fercoq (France), Ane Farstad (Norway) and Kim Ji-yoo (South Korea).

At the 2020 European Short Track Speed Skating Championships, Desmet finished 2nd in the closing super final, making him 5th in the final standings. At the 2021 European Short Track Speed Skating Championships, he was 12th in the final standings, and at the World Cup that year, Desmet finished in 9th place.

At the Short track speed skating at the 2022 Winter Olympics in Beijing, Desmet was eliminated in the heats of the 1000 metres due to a penalty, ended 13th in the 1500 metres and was eliminated in the Quarterfinals of the 500 metres.

In April 2022, at the 2022 World Short Track Speed Skating Championships in Montreal, he won two bronze medals in one day, the 500 metres and the 1500 metres.

In February 2026, he was part of the Belgian team, that also featured his sister, which won a bronze medal in the mixed team relay at the winter olympics. A month later the Belgian mixed relay team with Desmet and his sister again took a bronze medal on a world stage coming in third in the 2000 m relay at the 2026 World Short Track Speed Skating Championships in Montreal, Canada. He also won an individual bronze medal during the event on the 1500 m.
