= Itzhak de Laat =

Dutch speed skater (born 1994)

Personal information
- Nationality: Dutch
- Born: 13 June 1994 (age 32) Leeuwarden, Netherlands
- Height: 175 cm (5 ft 9 in)
- Weight: 63 kg (139 lb)

Sport
- Country: Netherlands
- Sport: Short-track speed skating
- Club: Trias Short Track Club
Medal record
Men's short-track speed skating
Representing the Netherlands
Olympic Games
Gold medal – first place	2026 Milano Cortina	5000 m relay
World Championships
Gold medal – first place	2017 Rotterdam	5000 m relay
Gold medal – first place	2021 Dordrecht	5000 m relay
Gold medal – first place	2023 Seoul	2000 m mixed relay
Silver medal – second place	2021 Dordrecht	1500 m
Silver medal – second place	2022 Montreal	5000 m relay
European Championships
Gold medal – first place	2017 Turin	5000 m relay
Gold medal – first place	2018 Dresden	5000 m relay
Gold medal – first place	2021 Gdańsk	5000 m relay
Gold medal – first place	2023 Gdańsk	5000 m relay
Gold medal – first place	2023 Gdańsk	2000 m mixed relay
Gold medal – first place	2024 Gdańsk	5000 m relay
Silver medal – second place	2019 Dordrecht	5000 m relay
Silver medal – second place	2020 Debrecen	1500 m
Silver medal – second place	2020 Debrecen	5000 m relay
Silver medal – second place	2026 Tilburg	5000 m relay
Bronze medal – third place	2015 Dordrecht	5000 m relay
Bronze medal – third place	2021 Gdańsk	500 m
Bronze medal – third place	2021 Gdańsk	1000 m
Bronze medal – third place	2021 Gdańsk	Overall
Bronze medal – third place	2024 Gdańsk	1500 m

Itzhak de Laat (born 13 June 1994) is a Dutch short-track speed skater. At the 2026 Winter Olympics, he won a gold medal in the 5000 m relay.

== Career ==
Influenced by his father, De Laat started with speed skating when he was eight years old, starting at the Trias Short Track Club in Leeuwarden. He won the gold medal in the 5000m relay event at the 2017 World Championships in Rotterdam in his own country.

He qualified for the 2018 Winter Olympics in the men's 1000 m, men's 1500 m and 5000 m relay event.

Inspired by metal music, he designs the images on his own helmets.
