= Rikki Doak =

Canadian speed skater

Personal information
- Born: October 27, 1998 (age 27) Fredericton, New Brunswick

Sport
- Country: Canada
- Sport: Short track speed skating
Medal record
Women's short track speed skating
Representing Canada
Event	1st	2nd	3rd
World Championships	1	1	0
Total	1	1	0
World Championships
Gold medal – first place	2025 Beijing	3000 m relay
Silver medal – second place	2025 Beijing	500 m

Rikki Doak (born October 10, 1997) is a Canadian short track speed skater. She is a two-time world championships medallist after winning a gold medal as part of the women's relay team at the 2025 world championships, as well as a bronze medal in the women's 500 m.

== Career ==
Doak represented New Brunswick at the 2015 Canada Winter Games where she helped the provincial team win a silver in the women's relay. She then began training at the Canada Regional Training Centre in Montreal with Speed Skating Canada before earning a spot on the national team in 2019. During the 2019-20 world cup season, Doak and teammate Courtney Sarault made history as the first two New Brunswick skaters to be on the national team at the same time since the year 2000.

Doak won her first world championships medals at the 2025 world championships where she won gold in the women's relay and a silver in the 500 m. After winning her silver medal she told CBC Sports that "I'm very happy with how I raced today. Winning my first world championship medal is crazy. I felt really good going into my races, which gave me confidence to be able to do what I did."

On December 17, 2025, Doak was named to Canada's 2026 Olympic team.
