= Friso Emons =

Dutch speed skater (born 1998)

Personal information
- Born: 5 October 1998 (age 28) Tilburg, Netherlands

Sport
- Country: Netherlands
- Sport: Short-track speed skating
Medal record
Men's short-track speed skating
Representing the Netherlands
Olympic Games
Gold medal – first place	2026 Milano Cortina	5000 m relay
World Championships
Silver medal – second place	2022 Montreal	5000 m relay
European Championships
Gold medal – first place	2021 Gdańsk	5000 m relay
Gold medal – first place	2023 Gdańsk	5000 m relay
Bronze medal – third place	2023 Gdańsk	1500 m
Silver medal – second place	2024 Gdańsk	5000 m relay
Silver medal – second place	2024 Gdańsk	1500 m
Silver medal – second place	2026 Tilburg	5000 m relay

Friso Emons (born 5 October 1998) is a Dutch short-track speed skater. He won the silver medal at the relay competition of the 2022 World Championships with the Dutch men's team. He placed second at the 1500 metre competition of the 2024 European Championships. He represented the Netherlands at the 2026 Winter Olympics, winning a gold medal in the 5000 m relay.

== Career ==
Emons started competitive speed skating at the age of 7 in IJssportcentrum Tilburg. He switched to short-track at the age of 10. At 15, Emons was selected for the young talent programme at Regionaal Talenten Centrum (RTC) in Dordrecht, a training facility for young talents.

In 2018 Emons joined the national senior team in Heerenveen. That year, he won a bronze medal with the relay team at the 2018 World Junior Championships. He was part of the national team that won a gold medal at the 2021 European Championships and a silver medal at the 2022 World Championships, but he was not selected for the 2022 Winter Olympics.

At the 2023 and 2024 European Championships, Emons won individual bronze and silver medals at the 1500 metre event. In 2026 he was part of the team that won the silver medal at these championships. Emons was selected to represent the Netherlands at the 2026 Winter Olympics.
