= Wang Xinran =

Chinese speed skater (born 2001)

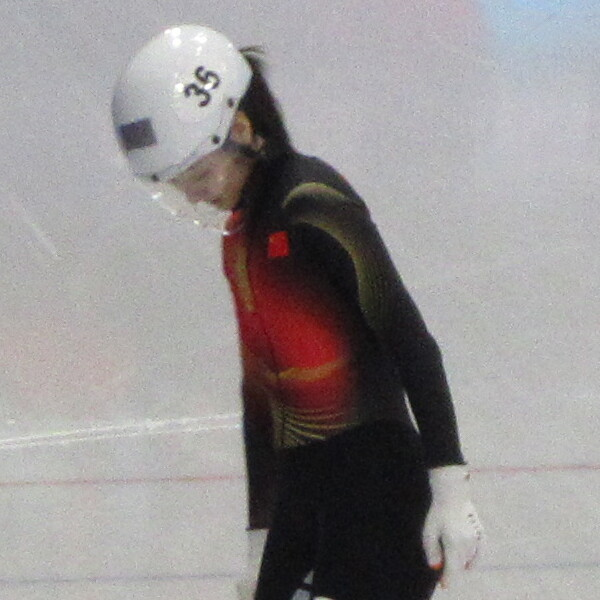
- Wang at the 2026 Winter Olympics

Personal information
- Born: 3 August 2001 (age 24) Shandong, China

Sport
- Country: China
- Sport: Short track speed skating
Medal record
Women's short-track speed skating
Representing China
World Championships
Silver medal – second place	2023 Seoul	2000 m mixed relay
Bronze medal – third place	2026 Montreal	3000 m relay
Four Continents Championships
Silver medal – second place	2023 Salt Lake City	2000 m mixed relay
Asian Games
Gold medal – first place	2025 Harbin	3000 m relay

Wang Xinran (王欣然, born 3 August 2001) is a Chinese short track speed-skater.

== Career ==
Wang competed at the 2023 World Short Track Speed Skating Championships and won a silver medal in the 2000 metre mixed relay, with a time of 2:41.821. She represented China at the 2025 Asian Winter Games and won a gold medal in the 3000 metre relay with a time of 4:11.371.

In January 2026, she was selected to represent China at the 2026 Winter Olympics.
