= 2021 European Short Track Speed Skating Championships =

2021 European Championships
- Venue: Hala Olivia
- Location: Gdańsk, Poland
- Dates: 22–24 January

The 2021 European Short Track Speed Skating Championships were held from 22 to 24 January 2021 in Gdańsk, Poland.

Due to fears around the COVID-19 pandemic seven time European champion Arianna Fontana will not take part. Neither will two time European champion Elise Christie and the rest of the British team.

== Medal summary ==
* Host nation (Poland)

Rank	Nation	Gold	Silver	Bronze	Total
1	Netherlands	5	2	5	12
2	Russia	4	1	3	8
3	France	1	0	0	1
4	Italy	0	3	1	4
5	Germany	0	2	1	3
6	Hungary	0	1	0	1
6	Poland*	0	1	0	1
Totals (7 entries)		10	10	10	30

=== Men ===
Event	Gold		Silver		Bronze	
Overall	Semion Elistratov; Russia	71 pts	Pietro Sighel; Italy	55 pts	Itzhak de Laat; Netherlands	55 pts
500 metres	Konstantin Ivliev; Russia	40.779	Pietro Sighel; Italy	40.896	Itzhak de Laat; Netherlands	41.056
1000 metres	Semion Elistratov; Russia	1:24.885	John-Henry Krueger; Hungary	1:25.232	Itzhak de Laat; Netherlands	1:25.280
1500 metres	Semion Elistratov; Russia	2:18.384	Denis Ayrapetyan; Russia	2:18.521	Sjinkie Knegt; Netherlands	2:18.561
5000 metre relay	Netherlands; Itzhak de Laat; Dylan Hoogerwerf; Sjinkie Knegt; Jens van 't Wout; Friso Emons	6:56.420	Italy; Andrea Cassinelli; Yuri Confortola; Pietro Sighel; Luca Spechenhauser	6:56.544	Russia; Semion Elistratov; Daniil Eybog; Konstantin Ivliev; Pavel Sitnikov; Denis Ayrapetyan	6:56.653

=== Women ===
Event	Gold		Silver		Bronze	
Overall	Suzanne Schulting; Netherlands	102 pts	Anna Seidel; Germany	55 pts	Sofia Prosvirnova; Russia	53 pts
500 metres	Suzanne Schulting; Netherlands	43.317	Natalia Maliszewska; Poland	43.441	Xandra Velzeboer; Netherlands	43.474
1000 metres	Suzanne Schulting; Netherlands	1:28.573	Selma Poutsma; Netherlands	1:28.873	Anna Seidel; Germany	1:29.357
1500 metres	Suzanne Schulting; Netherlands	2:24.446	Anna Seidel; Germany	2:24.777	Sofia Prosvirnova; Russia	2:25.468
3000 metre relay	France; Gwendoline Daudet; Tifany Huot-Marchand; Aurélie Lévêque; Aurélie Monvoisin	4:17.135	Netherlands; Rianne de Vries; Selma Poutsma; Suzanne Schulting; Xandra Velzeboer; Georgie Dalrymple	4:23.161	Italy; Gloria Ioriatti; Cynthia Mascitto; Arianna Sighel; Martina Valcepina; Elena Viviani	4:28.234
