= Natalia Maliszewska =

Polish speed skater (born 1995)

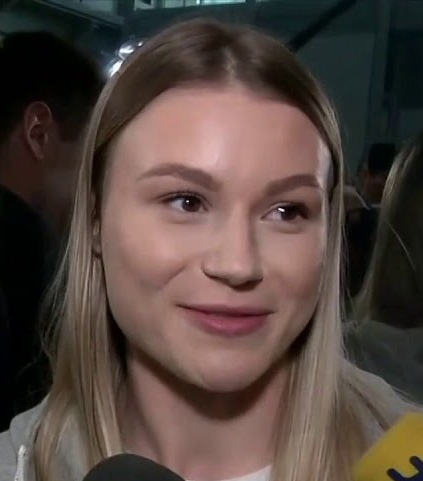
- Maliszewska in 2019

Personal information
- Born: 16 September 1995 (age 31) Białystok, Poland
- Height: 1.74 m (5 ft 9 in)
- Weight: 64 kg (141 lb)

Sport
- Country: Poland
- Sport: Short track speed skating

Achievements and titles
- Personal bests: 500 m: 42.587 (3 Nov 2018 Calgary); 1000 m: 1:31.041; 1500 m: 2:24.889; 3000 m: 5:16.546
Medal record
Women's short-track speed skating
Representing Poland
World Championships
Silver medal – second place	2018 Montreal	500 m
Silver medal – second place	2025 Beijing	3000 m relay
Bronze medal – third place	2025 Beijing	500 m
Bronze medal – third place	2025 Beijing	2000 m mixed relay
European Championships
Gold medal – first place	2019 Dordrecht	500 m
Silver medal – second place	2021 Gdańsk	500 m
Silver medal – second place	2023 Gdańsk	500 m
Silver medal – second place	2026 Tilburg	2000 m mixed relay
Bronze medal – third place	2013 Malmö	3000 m relay
Bronze medal – third place	2020 Debrecen	500 m
Bronze medal – third place	2025 Dresden	3000 m relay
Bronze medal – third place	2025 Dresden	2000 m mixed relay

Natalia Maliszewska (born 16 September 1995) is a Polish short track speed skater. She won silver medal at the 2018 World Short Track Speed Skating Championships and gold medal at the 2019 European Short Track Speed Skating Championships.

== Career ==
She started her career in short track speed skating in 2007. She made her debut in the 2012-13 ISU Short Track Speed Skating World Cup. In 2015, she became the first short track skater representing Poland to finish on the podium at a World Cup event when she placed second in the 500m in Montreal, Canada.

She competed in the women's 500 metres at the 2018 Winter Olympics. She won a silver medal in the 500 metres event at the 2018 World Short Track Speed Skating Championships held in Montreal. In 2019, she won a gold medal at the European Short Track Speed Skating Championships in Dordrecht in the 500 metre event.

She ended the 2018-19 ISU Short Track Speed Skating World Cup season by winning the general classification and becoming the 500 meter World Cup Champion. At the 2021 European Short Track Speed Skating Championships in Gdańsk she won silver medal in the 500 meters. At the 2022 Winter Olympics she was among the favourites to win an Olympic medal in the Women's 500 m event but was unable to compete as she tested positive for COVID-19 shortly after her arrival in Beijing.

== Personal life ==
Her older sister Patrycja Maliszewska is also a short track speed skater.

== See also ==
- Sport in Poland
- List of Poles
