= Thomas Nadalini =

Italian speed skater (born 2002)

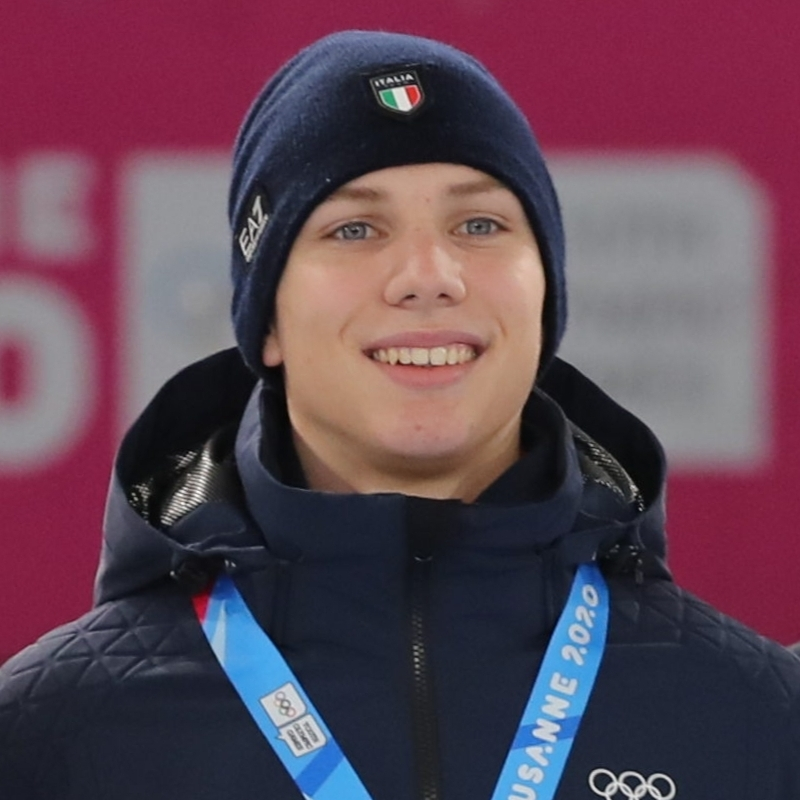
- Nadalini at the 2020 Winter Youth Olympics

Personal information
- Born: 2 May 2002 (age 24) Trento, Italy

Sport
- Country: Italy
- Sport: Short-track speed skating
- Club: Gruppo Sportivo Fiamme Oro
Medal record
Men's short-track speed skating
Representing Italy
Olympic Games
Gold medal – first place	2026 Milano Cortina	Mixed 2000 m relay
Bronze medal – third place	2026 Milano Cortina	5000 m relay
World Championships
Gold medal – first place	2026 Montreal	2000 m mixed relay
Silver medal – second place	2023 Seoul	5000 m
Silver medal – second place	2025 Beijing	2000 m mixed relay
Silver medal – second place	2026 Montreal	1500 m
Bronze medal – third place	2026 Montreal	5000 m relay
European Championships
Gold medal – first place	2025 Dresden	5000 m relay
Gold medal – first place	2026 Tilburg	5000 m relay
Silver medal – second place	2023 Gdańsk	5000 m relay
Bronze medal – third place	2023 Gdańsk	2000 m mixed relay
Bronze medal – third place	2026 Tilburg	1000 m
Bronze medal – third place	2026 Tilburg	1500 m
Representing Mixed-NOCs
Winter Youth Olympics
Bronze medal – third place	2020 Lausanne	Mixed team relay

Thomas Nadalini (born 2 May 2002) is an Italian short-track speed skater. He represented Italy at the 2026 Winter Olympics.

== Career ==
During the 2025–26 ISU Short Track World Tour, Nadalini earned his first career World Tour podium on 22 November 2025, finishing in second place.

In January 2026, he represented Italy at the 2026 European Short Track Speed Skating Championships and won a gold medal in the 5000 metre relay and bronze medals in the 1000 metres and 1500 metres.

He was selected to represent Italy at the 2026 Winter Olympics. On 10 February, 2026, he won a gold medal in the mixed 2000 metre relay with a time of 2:36.581. He also won a bronze medal in the 5000 metre relay with a time of 6:52.335.
