= Kamila Sellier =

Polish speed skater (born 2000)

Personal information
- Born: 12 April 2000 (age 26) Elbląg, Poland

Sport
- Country: Poland
- Sport: Short-track speed skating
Medal record
Women's short-track speed skating
Representing Poland
World Championships
Silver medal – second place	2025 Beijing	3000 m relay
Bronze medal – third place	2025 Beijing	2000 m mixed relay
European Championships
Silver medal – second place	2024 Gdańsk	2000 m mixed relay
Silver medal – second place	2026 Tilburg	2000 m mixed relay
Bronze medal – third place	2025 Dresden	3000 m relay
Bronze medal – third place	2025 Dresden	2000 m mixed relay
European Youth Olympics
Gold medal – first place	2017 Erzurum	1000 m
Silver medal – second place	2017 Erzurum	mixed relay

Kamila Sellier (née Stormowska; born 12 April 2000) is a Polish short-track speed skater. She is a two-time World Championship medalist and a four-time European Championship medalist.

== Career ==
Sellier made her World Cup debut in October 2015 in Calgary. At the 2017 European Youth Olympic Winter Festival in Erzurum, she won a gold medal in the 1000 meters and silver in the mixed relay. That same year, she was one of five athletes nominated for the Piotr Nurowski Award for the best young athlete in Europe, awarded by the Association of European Olympic Committees. On 16 February 2020, in Dordrecht, she stood on the podium in a World Cup competition for the first time, taking third place in the 500 meters. On 14 January 2024, Sellier, together with Nikola Mazur, Diané Sellier, and Michał Niewiński, won a silver medal in the 2000m at the European Short Track Speed Skating Championships.

In January 2026, Sellier competed at the 2026 European Short Track Speed Skating Championships and won a silver medal in the 2000 metre mixed relay. She was subsequently selected to represent Poland at the 2026 Winter Olympics. On 20 February during the Winter Olympics at the Milano Ice Skating Arena, Sellier was immobilized on a stretcher and wheeled out of the arena after a competitor's blade sliced her below her left eye during the 1,500 meters. She received stitches at the arena before going to the hospital for more tests. Sellier was forced to undergo facial surgery as a result of the crash.

== Personal life ==
In 2025, she married French short track speed skater, Diané Sellier.
