= Pietro Sighel =

Italian speed skater (born 1999)

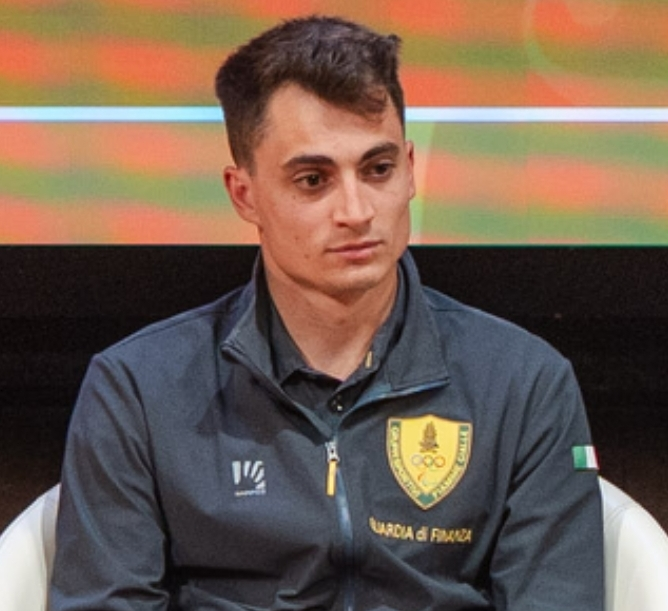
- Sighel in 2026

Personal information
- Born: 15 July 1999 (age 27) Trento, Italy
- Height: 1.71 m (5 ft 7 in)
- Weight: 66 kg (146 lb)

Sport
- Country: Italy
- Sport: Short-track speed skating
- Club: G.S. Fiamme Gialle
Medal record
Men's short-track speed skating
Representing Italy
Olympic Games
Gold medal – first place	2026 Milano Cortina	Mixed 2000 m relay
Silver medal – second place	2022 Beijing	Mixed 2000 m relay
Bronze medal – third place	2022 Beijing	5000 m relay
Bronze medal – third place	2026 Milano Cortina	5000 m relay
World Championships
Gold medal – first place	2023 Seoul	500 m
Gold medal – first place	2026 Montreal	2000 m mixed relay
Silver medal – second place	2023 Seoul	1500 m
Silver medal – second place	2023 Seoul	5000 m relay
Silver medal – second place	2024 Rotterdam	1000 m
Silver medal – second place	2024 Rotterdam	2000 m mixed relay
Silver medal – second place	2025 Beijing	2000 m mixed relay
Bronze medal – third place	2021 Dordrecht	500 m
Bronze medal – third place	2021 Dordrecht	1000 m
Bronze medal – third place	2021 Dordrecht	5000 m relay
Bronze medal – third place	2023 Seoul	2000 m mixed relay
Bronze medal – third place	2025 Beijing	1000 m
Bronze medal – third place	2026 Montreal	5000 m relay
European Championships
Gold medal – first place	2023 Gdańsk	500 m
Gold medal – first place	2024 Gdańsk	500 m
Gold medal – first place	2024 Gdańsk	1000 m
Gold medal – first place	2024 Gdańsk	1500 m
Gold medal – first place	2025 Dresden	1000 m
Gold medal – first place	2025 Dresden	5000 m relay
Gold medal – first place	2026 Tilburg	5000 m relay
Silver medal – second place	2021 Gdańsk	Overall
Silver medal – second place	2021 Gdańsk	500 m
Silver medal – second place	2021 Gdańsk	5000 m relay
Silver medal – second place	2023 Gdańsk	5000 m relay
Silver medal – second place	2025 Dresden	500 m
Bronze medal – third place	2023 Gdańsk	2000 m mixed relay
World Junior Championships
Bronze medal – third place	2019 Montreal	500 m
Bronze medal – third place	2019 Montreal	1500 m

Pietro Sighel (born 15 July 1999) is an Italian short track speed skater. He is a four-time Winter Olympic medalist, including gold in the 2026 mixed team relay. He was second in the overall classification at the 2021 European Championships in Gdańsk, where he also secured silver medals in both 500 m and 5000 m relay competitions. He won three bronze medals at the 2021 World Championships in Dordrecht.

== Career ==
Sighel's first World Cup successes came during the 2021-22 season. 24 October 2021 he together with Andrea Cassinelli, Yuri Confortola, and Tommaso Dotti finished third in 5000 m men's relay in Beijing. His first personal podium occurred on 28 November 2021 in Dordrecht, where he finished third in 1000 m.

Sighel also competes in long track speed skating. At the 2019 World Junior Speed Skating Championships in Baselga di Piné, he finished 37th in 1500 m competition and 33rd in 3000 m competition.

Sighel began skating at age four in Baselga di Pinè, Italy. His father Roberto competed in speed skating at top international level from 1988 to 2002, including all Olympic Winter Games between 1988 and 2002. His older sister Arianna also competes in short track speed skating; she was part of the women's 3000m relay teams that won bronze at both the world and European championships in 2021.

Sighel is law enforcement officer of Guardia di Finanza and member of Gruppi Sportivi Fiamme Gialle since 2019.
