= Suzanne Schulting =

Dutch speed skater (born 1997)

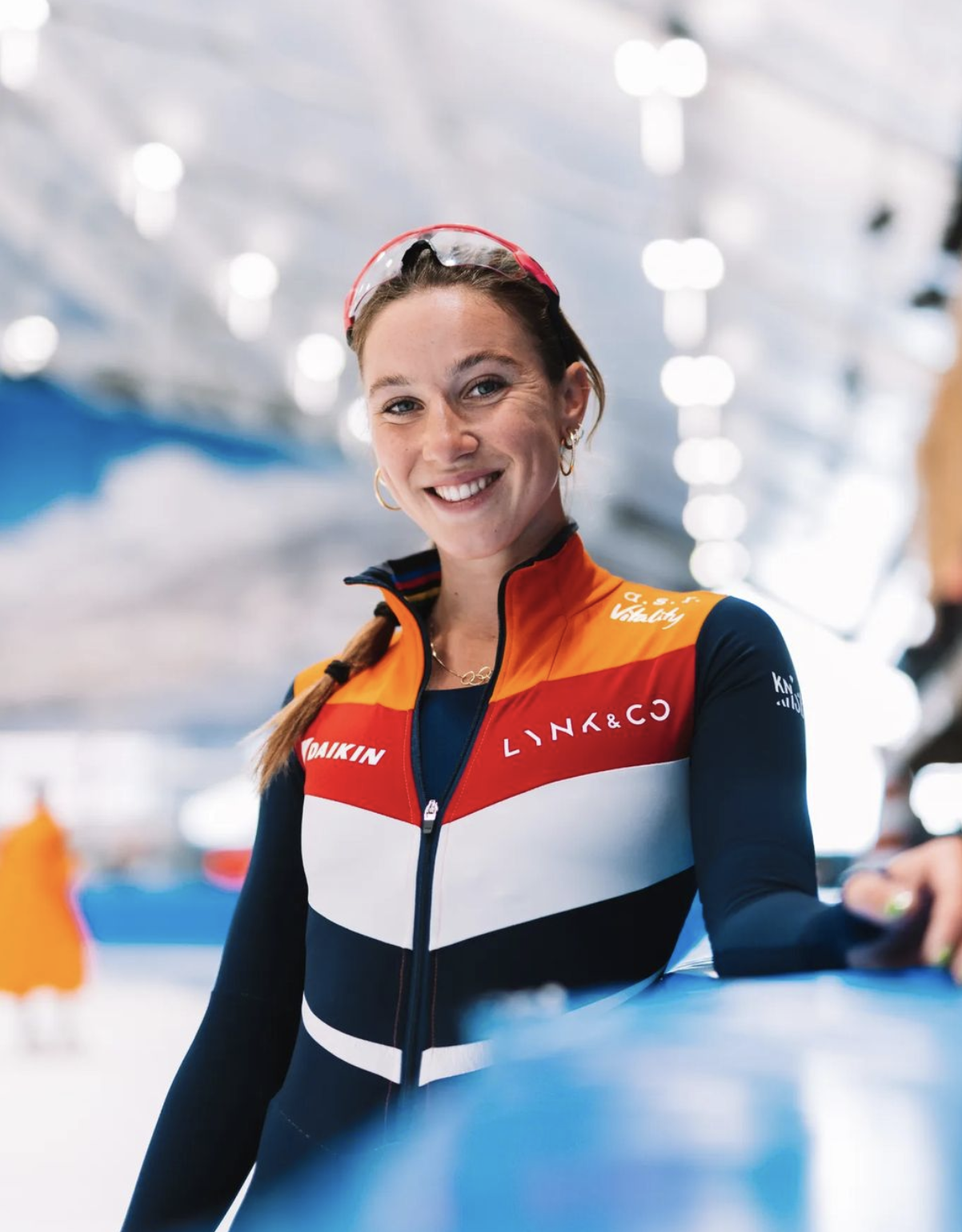
- Schulting in 2022

Personal information
- Nationality: Dutch
- Born: 25 September 1997 (age 28) Groningen, Netherlands
- Height: 1.70 m (5 ft 7 in)
- Weight: 65 kg (143 lb)

Sport
- Country: Netherlands
- Sport: Short track speed skating Long track speed skating
- Club: Team Essent
- Coached by: Jac Orie

Achievements and titles
- Personal bests: Short track speed skating: 500 m: 42.330 (2021); 1000 m: 1:26:514 WR (2022); 1500 m: 2:18:594 (2021); 3000 m: 5:06:350 (2019)
Medal record
Representing the Netherlands
Women's short-track speed skating
Senior level
Event	1st	2nd	3rd
Olympic Games	3	1	2
World Championships	11	2	2
European Championships	17	5	3
Total	31	8	7
Olympic Games
Gold medal – first place	2018 Pyeongchang	1000 m
Gold medal – first place	2022 Beijing	1000 m
Gold medal – first place	2022 Beijing	3000 m relay
Silver medal – second place	2022 Beijing	500 m
Bronze medal – third place	2018 Pyeongchang	3000 m relay
Bronze medal – third place	2022 Beijing	1500 m
World Championships
Gold medal – first place	2019 Sofia	Overall
Gold medal – first place	2019 Sofia	1000 m
Gold medal – first place	2021 Dordrecht	Overall
Gold medal – first place	2021 Dordrecht	1500 m
Gold medal – first place	2021 Dordrecht	500 m
Gold medal – first place	2021 Dordrecht	1000 m
Gold medal – first place	2021 Dordrecht	3000 m relay
Gold medal – first place	2023 Seoul	1500 m
Gold medal – first place	2023 Seoul	3000 m relay
Gold medal – first place	2023 Seoul	2000 m mixed relay
Gold medal – first place	2024 Rotterdam	3000 m relay
Silver medal – second place	2018 Montreal	3000 m relay
Silver medal – second place	2023 Seoul	500 m
Bronze medal – third place	2017 Rotterdam	1000 m
Bronze medal – third place	2019 Sofia	500 m
European Championships
Gold medal – first place	2016 Sochi	3000 m relay
Gold medal – first place	2019 Dordrecht	Overall
Gold medal – first place	2019 Dordrecht	1500 m
Gold medal – first place	2019 Dordrecht	3000 m relay
Gold medal – first place	2020 Debrecen	Overall
Gold medal – first place	2020 Debrecen	500 m
Gold medal – first place	2020 Debrecen	1000 m
Gold medal – first place	2020 Debrecen	1500 m
Gold medal – first place	2020 Debrecen	3000 m relay
Gold medal – first place	2021 Gdańsk	Overall
Gold medal – first place	2021 Gdańsk	500 m
Gold medal – first place	2021 Gdańsk	1000 m
Gold medal – first place	2021 Gdańsk	1500 m
Gold medal – first place	2023 Gdańsk	500 m
Gold medal – first place	2023 Gdańsk	1500 m
Gold medal – first place	2023 Gdańsk	3000 m relay
Gold medal – first place	2023 Gdańsk	2000 m mixed relay
Silver medal – second place	2015 Dordrecht	3000 m relay
Silver medal – second place	2016 Sochi	1000 m
Silver medal – second place	2018 Dresden	1000 m
Silver medal – second place	2021 Gdansk	3000 m relay
Silver medal – second place	2023 Gdańsk	1000 m
Bronze medal – third place	2016 Sochi	Overall
Bronze medal – third place	2016 Sochi	1500 m
Bronze medal – third place	2017 Turin	3000 m relay
World Junior Championships
Gold medal – first place	2016 Sofia	1500 m
Gold medal – first place	2016 Sofia	1500 m super final
Silver medal – second place	2015 Osaka	1500 m
Silver medal – second place	2016 Sofia	Overall
Bronze medal – third place	2016 Sofia	3000 m relay
Women's speed skating
World Single Distances Championships
Gold medal – first place	2025 Hamar	Team sprint
World Sprint Championships
Silver medal – second place	2026 Heerenveen	Sprint
European Championships
Bronze medal – third place	2025 Heerenveen	Sprint

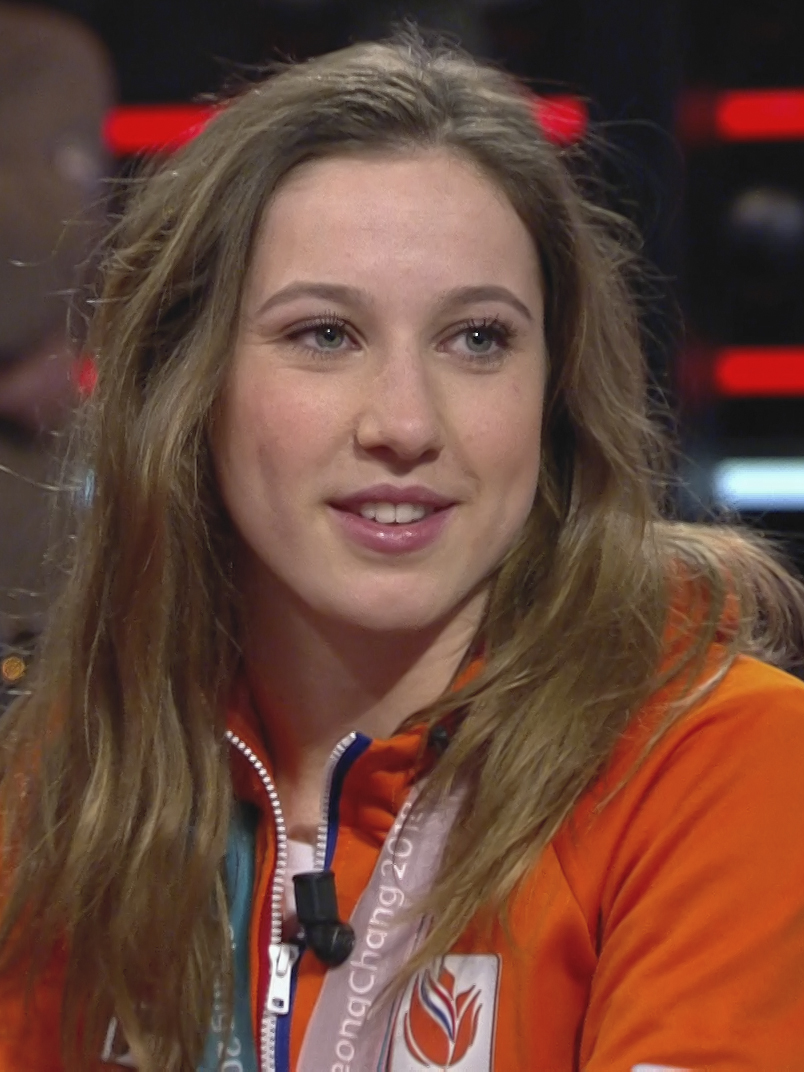
On a television show in 2018

Suzanne Schulting (Dutch pronunciation: [syˈzɑnə ˈsxʏltɪŋ]; born 25 September 1997) is a Dutch short track speed skater, who is also active as a long track speed skater. At the 2018 Winter Olympics, she won the Netherlands' first-ever gold medal in short track speed skating and became one of the youngest-ever Dutch Winter Olympic champions. She is also a two-time overall World Champion (2019, 2021) and three-time overall European Champion (2019, 2020, 2021), and the current world record holder over 1000 metres.

== Biography ==
Schulting took up short track speed skating when she was eight years old in Thialf, Heerenveen. She won a gold medal in the 1500m event at the 2016 World Junior Championships in Sofia.

At the 2018 Winter Olympics, she won a bronze medal in the 3000 m relay and a gold medal in the 1000 m. This was the first time the Netherlands had ever won a gold medal in short track speed skating. At just 20 years old, she became the second youngest Dutch Olympic gold medalist in any discipline at a Winter Olympics. In December 2018, she was named the Dutch Sportswoman of the Year.

During the 2018–19 season, she finished first overall at the 2019 European Championships and 2019 World Championships. The following season, Schulting successfully defended her title at the 2020 European Championships, while the World Championships in Seoul was cancelled due to the COVID-19 pandemic. Schulting was once again crowned overall champion after winning every single race she started in at both the 2021 European Championships and 2021 World Championships, though many prominent countries didn't attend or boycotted the latter for various reasons, including the COVID-19 pandemic.

Schulting competed for Netherlands in short track speed skating at the 2022 Beijing Olympic Winter Games in February 2022, winning gold in the 1000 metres as well as the 3000 metre relay, setting a new world and Olympic record for the 1000 metres during the quarterfinal. She also won a silver medal in the 500 metres, setting a new Olympic record during the heats, and a bronze in the 1500 metres.

Schulting did not compete at the 2022 World Championships in Montreal after testing positive for COVID-19. She won the Crystal Globe for best overall skater at the 2022-23 World Cup.

Since the 2024–25 season, Schulting has gradually shifted her focus away from short track speed skating to improve as a long track speed skater. She managed to qualify for the 2026 Winter Olympics in both disciplines. She competed in the long track 1000 metres event, finishing in eighth. In short track, Schulting was selected to skate the 1500 metres, where she was eliminated in the semifinals. Schulting concluded her season by winning a silver medal at the 2026 World Sprint Speed Skating Championships. In April 2026, Schulting extended her contract with Team Essent until the 2027–28 season. Upon signing, Schulting stated that she planned to continue combining both speed skating disciplines.

== Personal records ==
Personal records
Speed skating
Event	Result	Date	Location	Notes
500 metre	0:37.24	28 February 2026	Thialf, Heerenveen	
1000 metre	1:13.81	28 February 2026	Thialf, Heerenveen	
1500 metre	1:57.02	25 September 2021	Thialf, Heerenveen	
3000 metre	4:13.22	4 October 2025	Thialf, Heerenveen	

== Tournament overview: long track speed skating ==
Season	Dutch Championships Single Distances	Dutch Championships Sprint	World Championships Single Distances
2015–16	11th 1000m 11th Mass start		
2016–17	6th 500m 4th 1000m (bronze) Mass start		
2017–18	8th 1000m		
2018–19	15th 500m 13th 1000m 16th Mass start		
2019–20	(bronze) Mass start		
2020–21	6th 1000m	5th 500m (bronze) 1000m 4th 500m 4th 1000m (bronze) overall	HEERENVEEN 14th 500m 8th 1000m
