= Selma Poutsma =

Dutch speed skater (born 1999)

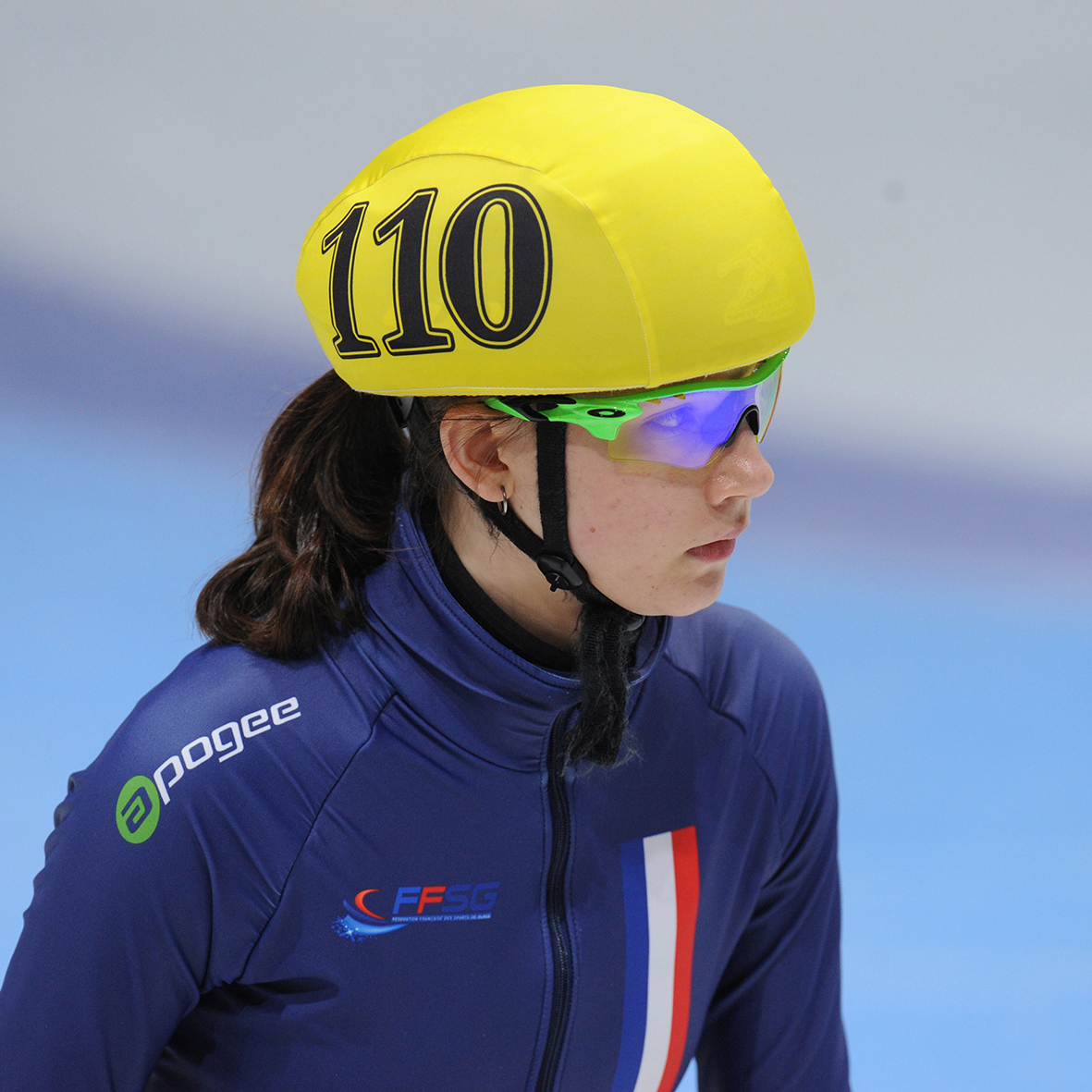
- Poutsma in 2016

Personal information
- Nationality: Dutch
- Born: 14 May 1999 (age 27) The Hague, Netherlands

Sport
- Country: France (2014–2018); Netherlands (2019–)
- Sport: Short track speed skating
- Club: Shorttrack Brabant
Medal record
Women's short-track speed skating
Representing the Netherlands
Olympic Games
Gold medal – first place	2022 Beijing	3000 m relay
World Championships
Gold medal – first place	2021 Dordrecht	3000 m relay
Gold medal – first place	2023 Seoul	3000 m relay
Gold medal – first place	2024 Rotterdam	3000 m relay
Gold medal – first place	2023 Seoul	2000 m mixed relay
Gold medal – first place	2026 Montreal	3000 m relay
Silver medal – second place	2026 Montreal	500 m
Bronze medal – third place	2021 Dordrecht	500 m
Bronze medal – third place	2022 Montreal	3000 m relay
Bronze medal – third place	2023 Seoul	500 m
European Championships
Gold medal – first place	2023 Gdańsk	3000 m relay
Gold medal – first place	2023 Gdańsk	2000 m mixed relay
Gold medal – first place	2024 Gdańsk	3000 m relay
Gold medal – first place	2024 Gdańsk	2000 m mixed relay
Gold medal – first place	2026 Tilburg	3000 m relay
Gold medal – first place	2026 Tilburg	2000 m mixed relay
Silver medal – second place	2021 Gdańsk	1000 m
Silver medal – second place	2021 Gdańsk	3000 m relay
Silver medal – second place	2024 Gdańsk	500 m
Silver medal – second place	2024 Gdańsk	1000 m
Bronze medal – third place	2026 Tilburg	500 m
Representing France
European Championships
Bronze medal – third place	2018 Dresden	3000 m relay

Selma Poutsma (born 14 May 1999) is a Dutch short track speed skater who previously competed for France.

== Biography ==
In 2014 Poutsma moved to France and competed for the French short track speed skating team, winning the bronze medal in the relay at the 2018 European Short Track Speed Skating Championships. In 2018 she moved back to the Netherlands and in 2020 started competing for the Netherlands. She won several medals at the 2021 European Short Track Speed Skating Championships and 2021 World Short Track Speed Skating Championships. In 2022 she won a gold medal in the relay at the Olympics in Beijing.
