= 2025 World Short Track Speed Skating Championships =

Speed skating event in China

- Venue: Capital Indoor Stadium
- Location: Beijing, China
- Dates: 14–16 March
- Nations: 36

The 2025 World Short Track Speed Skating Championships were held from 14 to 16 March 2025 at the Capital Indoor Stadium in Beijing, China.

== Schedule ==
The Championships consisted of nine events: three individual events for men and women and three team events.

		Fri 14	Sat 15	Sun 16
Men	500 m	H	R, QF, SF, F	
Men	1000 m	H		R, QF, SF, F
Men	1500 m	QF	R, SF, F	
Men	5000 m relay	QF	SF	F
Women	500 m	H		R, QF, SF, F
Women	1000 m	H	R, QF, SF, F	
Women	1500 m	QF		R, SF, F
Women	3000 m relay		SF, F	
Mixed	2000 m relay	QF	SF	F

== Medal summary ==
=== Medal table ===
* Host nation (China)

Rank	Nation	Gold	Silver	Bronze	Total
1	Canada	6	4	0	10
2	Belgium	1	1	0	2
3	Netherlands	1	0	3	4
4	South Korea	1	0	2	3
5	Poland	0	1	2	3
6	China*	0	1	1	2
6	Italy	0	1	1	2
8	Kazakhstan	0	1	0	1
Totals (8 entries)		9	9	9	27

=== Men ===
Event	Gold		Silver		Bronze	
500 m	Steven Dubois; Canada	40.008	Denis Nikisha; Kazakhstan	40.096	Jens van 't Wout; Netherlands	40.163
1000 m	Steven Dubois; Canada	1:23.348	William Dandjinou; Canada	1:23.352	Pietro Sighel; Italy	1:23.417
1500 m	William Dandjinou; Canada	2:15.064	Stijn Desmet; Belgium	2:15.176	Shaoang Liu; China	2:15.871
5000 m relay	Canada; William Dandjinou; Steven Dubois; Maxime Laoun; Félix Roussel; Jordan Pierre-Gilles	6:41.271	China; Li Wenlong; Liu Guanyi; Shaoang Liu; Sun Long; Shaolin Sándor Liu	6:41.840	South Korea; Jang Sung-woo; Kim Gun-woo; Lee Jung-su; Park Ji-won; Seo Yi-ra	6:41.891

=== Women ===
Event	Gold		Silver		Bronze	
500 m	Xandra Velzeboer; Netherlands	42.132	Rikki Doak; Canada	42.286	Natalia Maliszewska; Poland	42.561
1000 m	Hanne Desmet; Belgium	1:28.641	Courtney Sarault; Canada	1:28.929	Xandra Velzeboer; Netherlands	1:28.991
1500 m	Choi Min-jeong; South Korea	2:27.136	Courtney Sarault; Canada	2:27.194	Kim Gil-li; South Korea	2:27.257
3000 m relay	Canada; Kim Boutin; Florence Brunelle; Rikki Doak; Courtney Sarault	4:09.254	Poland; Natalia Maliszewska; Nikola Mazur; Kamila Stormowska; Gabriela Topolska	4:09.321	Netherlands; Zoë Deltrap; Diede van Oorschot; Michelle Velzeboer; Xandra Velzeboer	4:09.392

=== Mixed ===
Event	Gold		Silver		Bronze	
2000 m relay	Canada; Kim Boutin; Florence Brunelle; William Dandjinou; Steven Dubois; Danaé Blais; Félix Roussel	2:36.232	Italy; Chiara Betti; Gloria Ioriatti; Thomas Nadalini; Pietro Sighel; Elisa Confortola; Luca Spechenhauser	2:36.619	Poland; Natalia Maliszewska; Michal Niewinski; Diane Sellier; Kamila Stormowska; Łukasz Kuczyński	2:41.860

== Participating nations ==
The final entry list contained 36 participating nations and almost 200 participants, including substitutes:

- Australia (3)
- Austria (3)
- Belgium (9)
- Bosnia and Herzegovina (1)
- Bulgaria (4)
- Canada (12)
- China (12)
- Croatia (2)
- Czech Republic (3)
- France (4)
- Great Britain (6)
- Germany (4)
- Hong Kong (2)
- Hungary (8)
- Ireland (1)
- Italy (12)
- Japan (12)
- Kazakhstan (10)
- South Korea (16)
- Latvia (2)
- Luxembourg (1)
- Mongolia (3)
- Netherlands (16)
- Norway (3)
- New Zealand (2)
- Poland (10)
- Singapore (2)
- Slovenia (1)
- Serbia (1)
- Slovakia (2)
- Thailand (2)
- Taiwan (2)
- Turkey (4)
- Ukraine (8)
- United States (15)
- Uzbekistan (1)
