= Jens van 't Wout =

Dutch speed skater (born 2001)

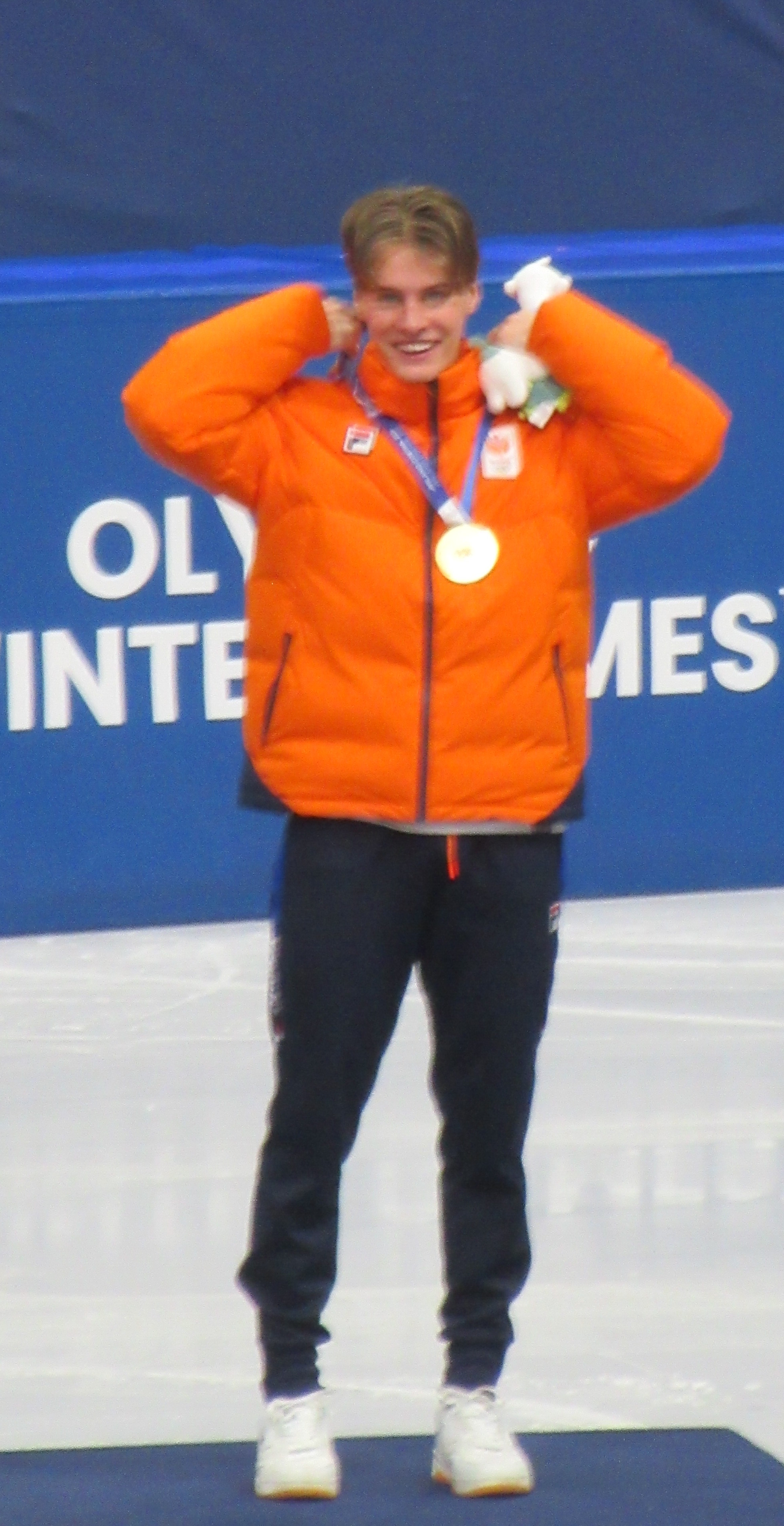
- van 't Wout at the 2026 Winter Olympics

Personal information
- Born: 6 October 2001 (age 24) Laren, Netherlands
- Home town: Sintjohannesga, Netherlands

Sport
- Country: Netherlands
- Sport: Short-track speed skating
- Club: RTC Noord Shorttrack
Medal record
Men's short-track speed skating
Representing the Netherlands
Olympic Games
Gold medal – first place	2026 Milano Cortina	1000 m
Gold medal – first place	2026 Milano Cortina	1500 m
Gold medal – first place	2026 Milano Cortina	5000 m relay
Bronze medal – third place	2026 Milano Cortina	500 m
World Championships
Gold medal – first place	2021 Dordrecht	5000 m relay
Gold medal – first place	2023 Seoul	2000 m mixed relay
Silver medal – second place	2024 Rotterdam	1500 m
Silver medal – second place	2026 Montreal	500 m
Silver medal – second place	2026 Montreal	1000 m
Bronze medal – third place	2023 Seoul	500 m
Bronze medal – third place	2025 Beijing	500 m
European Championships
Gold medal – first place	2021 Gdańsk	5000 m relay
Gold medal – first place	2023 Gdańsk	1500 m
Gold medal – first place	2023 Gdańsk	5000 m relay
Gold medal – first place	2023 Gdańsk	2000 m mixed relay
Gold medal – first place	2025 Dresden	500 m
Gold medal – first place	2025 Dresden	1500 m
Gold medal – first place	2026 Tilburg	500 m
Gold medal – first place	2026 Tilburg	1000 m
Gold medal – first place	2026 Tilburg	1500 m
Gold medal – first place	2026 Tilburg	2000 m mixed relay
Silver medal – second place	2023 Gdańsk	500 m
Silver medal – second place	2023 Gdańsk	1000 m
Silver medal – second place	2025 Dresden	1000 m
Silver medal – second place	2025 Dresden	2000 m mixed relay
Silver medal – second place	2026 Tilburg	5000 m relay

Jens van 't Wout (born 6 October 2001) is a Dutch short track speed skater. He became a three time Olympic champion and also won a bronze medal at the 2026 Winter Olympics. He set an Olympic Record with the Dutch team in the Mixed 2000 metre relay at the 2022 Winter Olympics.

== Personal life ==
Van 't Wout's older brother Melle is also a short-track speed skater.

Olympic Games
Preceded by Femke Bol; Harrie Lavreysen	Flag bearer for the Netherlands; 2026 opening ceremony With: Kimberley Bos	Succeeded by Jorrit Bergsma; Xandra Velzeboer
