= Moon Won-jun =

South Korean-Hungarian speed skater (born 2001)

Personal information
- Born: 7 March 2001 (age 25) Gimhae, South Korea

Sport
- Country: South Korea; Hungary
- Sport: Short track speed skating
Medal record
Men's short-track speed skating
Representing Hungary
European Championships
Bronze medal – third place	2026 Tilburg	2000 m mixed relay

Moon Won-jun (Korean: 문원준; born 7 March 2001) is a short-track speed skater. Born in South Korea, he represented Hungary at the 2026 Winter Olympics.

== Career ==
Moon became a naturalized citizen of Hungary along with Kim Min-seok. In January 2026, he competed at the 2026 European Short Track Speed Skating Championships and won a bronze medal in the 2000 metre mixed relay. He was selected to represent Hungary at the 2026 Winter Olympics.
