= Xandra Velzeboer =

Dutch speed skater (born 2001)

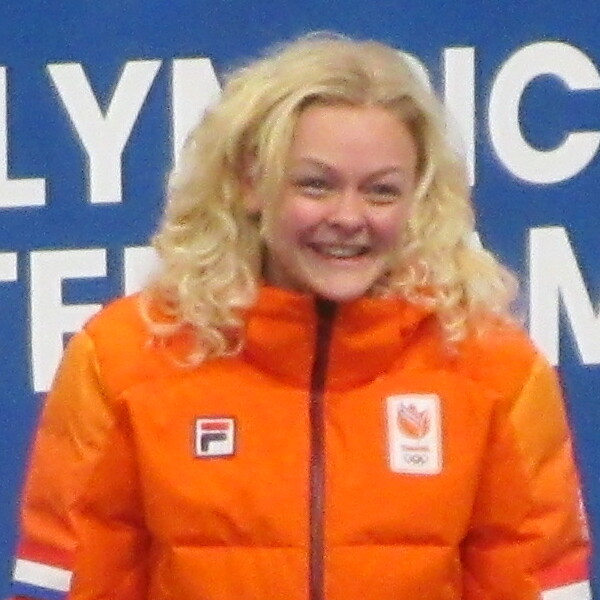
- Velzeboer at the 2026 Winter Olympics

Personal information
- Nationality: Dutch
- Born: 7 September 2001 (age 25) Culemborg, Netherlands

Sport
- Country: Netherlands
- Sport: Short-track speed skating
- Club: Shorttrack Brabant
Medal record
Women's short-track speed skating
Representing the Netherlands
Olympic Games
Gold medal – first place	2022 Beijing	3000 m relay
Gold medal – first place	2026 Milano Cortina	500 m
Gold medal – first place	2026 Milano Cortina	1000 m
World Championships
Gold medal – first place	2021 Dordrecht	3000 m relay
Gold medal – first place	2022 Montreal	500 m
Gold medal – first place	2023 Seoul	500 m
Gold medal – first place	2023 Seoul	1000 m
Gold medal – first place	2023 Seoul	3000 m relay
Gold medal – first place	2023 Seoul	2000 m mixed relay
Gold medal – first place	2024 Rotterdam	3000 m relay
Gold medal – first place	2025 Beijing	500 m
Gold medal – first place	2026 Montreal	500 m
Gold medal – first place	2026 Montreal	3000 m relay
Silver medal – second place	2024 Rotterdam	500 m
Silver medal – second place	2026 Montreal	1000 m
Silver medal – second place	2026 Montreal	1500 m
Bronze medal – third place	2022 Montreal	Overall
Bronze medal – third place	2022 Montreal	1000 m
Bronze medal – third place	2022 Montreal	3000 m relay
Bronze medal – third place	2021 Dordrecht	1500 m
Bronze medal – third place	2025 Beijing	1000 m
Bronze medal – third place	2025 Beijing	3000 m relay
European Championships
Gold medal – first place	2023 Gdańsk	3000 m relay
Gold medal – first place	2023 Gdańsk	2000 m mixed relay
Gold medal – first place	2024 Gdańsk	500 m
Gold medal – first place	2024 Gdańsk	3000 m relay
Gold medal – first place	2024 Gdańsk	2000 m mixed relay
Gold medal – first place	2025 Dresden	1500 m
Gold medal – first place	2026 Tilburg	500 m
Gold medal – first place	2026 Tilburg	1000 m
Gold medal – first place	2026 Tilburg	3000 m relay
Gold medal – first place	2026 Tilburg	2000 m mixed relay
Silver medal – second place	2021 Gdańsk	3000 m relay
Bronze medal – third place	2021 Gdańsk	500 m
Bronze medal – third place	2024 Gdańsk	1000 m

Xandra Velzeboer (born 7 September 2001) is a Dutch short track speed skater. Velzeboer won a gold medal in the 500 metres at the 2026 Winter Olympics, setting a world record in the semi-finals, as well as a gold medal in the 1000 metres. She was a member of the gold medal-winning 3,000 metre relay women's short track team at the 2022 Winter Olympics.

Velzeboer is the older sister of Michelle Velzeboer, also a short track speed skater, who won the silver medal in the girls' 500 metres at the 2020 Winter Youth Olympics. Monique Velzeboer, 1988 Olympic gold medalist, is her aunt.

Velzeboer is a former student of the University of Groningen.

Olympic Games
Preceded by Kimberley Bos; Jens van 't Wout	Flag bearer for the Netherlands; 2026 closing ceremony With: Jorrit Bergsma	Most recent
