= Short-track speed skating at the Winter World University Games =

- Events: 9 (men: 4; women: 4; mixed: 1)

Games
- 1959; 1960; 1961; 1962; 1963; 1964; 1965; 1966; 1967; 1968; 1970; 1970; 1973; 1972; 1975; 1975; 1977; 1978; 1979; 1981; 1983; 1985; 1987; 1989; 1991; 1993; 1995; 1997; 1999; 2001; 2003; 2005; 2007; 2009; 2011; 2013; 2015; 2017; 2019; 2023; 2025

Short-track speed skating events have been contested at the Universiade since 1985 as an optional sport. Starting in 1991, it has been a mandatory sport.

== Events ==
Event	85	89	91	93	95	97	99	01	03	05	07	09	11	13	15	17	19	23	25	Years
Men's 500 metres	•	•	•	•	•	•	•	•	•	•	•	•	•	•	•	•	•	•	•	19
Men's 1000 metres	•	•	•	•	•	•	•	•	•	•	•	•	•	•	•	•	•	•	•	19
Men's 1500 metres	•	•	•	•	•	•	•	•	•	•	•	•	•	•	•	•	•	•	•	19
Men's 3000 metres	•	•	•	•	•	•	•	•	•	•	•	•								12
Men's 5000 metres relay		•	•	•	•	•	•	•	•	•	•	•	•	•	•	•	•	•	•	18
Women's 500 metres	•	•	•	•	•	•	•	•	•	•	•	•	•	•	•	•	•	•	•	19
Women's 1000 metres	•	•	•	•	•	•	•	•	•	•	•	•	•	•	•	•	•	•	•	19
Women's 1500 metres	•	•	•	•	•	•	•	•	•	•	•	•	•	•	•	•	•	•	•	19
Women's 3000 metres	•	•	•	•	•	•	•	•	•	•	•	•								12
Women's 3000 metres relay		•	•	•	•	•	•	•	•	•	•	•	•	•	•	•	•	•	•	18
Mixed team 2000 metres relay																		•	•	2
Total	8	10	10	10	10	10	10	10	10	10	10	10	8	8	8	8	8	9	9	

== Medalists ==
=== Men ===
==== 500 m ====
Year	Gold	Silver	Bronze
1985	(Canada) Louis Grenier	(Australia) Danny Kah	(Netherlands) Charles Veldhoven
1987	not included in the program		
1989	(South Korea) Lee Joon-ho	(United States) Andrew Gabel	(South Korea) Kim Ki-hoon
1991	(South Korea) Kim Ki-hoon	(United Kingdom) Wilf O'Reilly	(Italy) Hugo Herrnhof
1993	(South Korea) Park Sae-woo	(United States) Eric Flaim	(South Korea) Lee Joon-ho
1995	(Canada) Andrew Quinn	(South Korea) Park Sae-woo	(South Korea) Song Jae-kun
1997	(Japan) Satoru Terao	(Italy) Nicola Franceschina	(China) An Yulong
1999	(Italy) Nicola Franceschina	(Canada) Jeff Scholten	(Japan) Takafumi Nishitani
2001	(Japan) Takafumi Nishitani	(Italy) Nicola Rodigari	(China) Li Haonan
2003	(Canada) Jeff Scholten	(Canada) Daryl Rasmussen	(China) Liu Lantian
2005	(South Korea) Song Suk-woo	(South Korea) Seo Ho-jin	(China) Sui Baoku
2007	(South Korea) Sung Si-bak	(China) Zhao Qiunyi	(China) Han Jaliang
2009	(South Korea) Jang Won-hoon	(China) Gao Ming	(Japan) Junji Ito
2011	(France) Thibaut Fauconnet	(Canada) Liam McFarlane	(China) Gao Ming
2013	(South Korea) Lee Hyo-Been	(Canada) Patrick Duffy	(China) Shi Jingnan
2015	(South Korea) Seo Yi-ra	(South Korea) Han Seung-soo	(China) Chen Guang
2017	(South Korea) Kim Do-kyoum	(Kazakhstan) Abzal Azhgaliyev	(Kazakhstan) Denis Nikisha
2019	(South Korea) Park Ji-won	(South Korea) Lim Yong-jin	(Russia) Konstantin Ivliev
2023	(Japan) Shogo Miyata	(South Korea) Kim Tae-sung	(China) Li Kongchao
2025	(South Korea) Kim Tae-sung	(Japan) Shogo Miyata	(South Korea) Lee Dong-hyun

==== 1000 m ====
Year	Gold	Silver	Bronze
1985	(Netherlands) Charles Veldhoven	(Canada) Louis Grenier	(Canada) Guy Daignault
1987	not included in the program		
1989	(South Korea) Kim Ki-hoon	(South Korea) Lee Joon-ho	(United States) Andrew Gabel
1991	(South Korea) Kim Ki-hoon	(United Kingdom) Wilf O'Reilly	(Japan) Toshinobu Kawai
1993	(South Korea) Lee Joon-ho	(South Korea) Song Jae-kun	(North Korea) Kim Chang-hwan
1995	(South Korea) Chae Ji-hoon	(South Korea) Park Sae-woo	(Canada) Francois Drolet
1997	(China) Li Jiajun	(Japan) Satoru Terao	(Italy) Nicola Franceschina
1999	(Canada) Jeff Scholten	(China) Lu Yan	(Italy) Nicola Franceschina
2001	(South Korea) Min Ryoung	(France) Bruno Loscos	(South Korea) Lee Seung-jae
2003	(China) Li Ye	(Canada) Jeff Scholten	(Canada) Daryl Rasmussen
2005	(South Korea) Sung Si-bak	(South Korea) Seo Ho-jin	(South Korea) Ahn Hyun-soo
2007	(South Korea) Sung Si-bak	(South Korea) Lee Seung-hoon	(South Korea) Lee Hyeon-sung
2009	(South Korea) Lee Seung-hoon	(Canada) Guillaume Bastille	(Russia) Ruslan Zakharov
2011	(South Korea) Kim Tae-Hoon	(China) Sui Baoku	(South Korea) Kim Seoung-il
2013	(South Korea) Noh Jin-kyu	(South Korea) Um Cheon-ho	(Canada) Guillaume Bastille
2015	(South Korea) Park Se-yeong	(South Korea) Seo Yi-ra	(China) Chen Guang
2017	(South Korea) Lim Kyoung-won	(South Korea) Park Ji-won	(Kazakhstan) Denis Nikisha
2019	(South Korea) Hong Kyung-hwan	(South Korea) Lim Yong-jin	(South Korea) Park Ji-won
2023	(South Korea) Jang Sung-woo	(South Korea) Lee Jeong-min	(South Korea) Kim Tae-sung
2025	(South Korea) Kim Tae-sung	(South Korea) Lee Dong-hyun	(South Korea) Bae Seo-chan

==== 1500 m ====
Year	Gold	Silver	Bronze
1985	(Canada) Guy Daignault	(Canada) Louis Grenier	(Canada) Michel Daignault
1987	not included in the program		
1989	(China) Jiang Zhibin	(South Korea) Mo Ji-soo	(United States) Andrew Gabel
1991	(South Korea) Kim Ki-hoon	(United States) Andrew Gabel	(Japan) Toshinobu Kawai
1993	(South Korea) Lee Joon-ho	(South Korea) Song Jae-kun	(South Korea) Jun Jai-mok
1995	(South Korea) Chae Ji-hoon	(China) Li Jiajun	(Canada) Francois Drolet
1997	(China) Li Jiajun	(France) Bruno Loscos	(Italy) Michele Antonioli
1999	(Italy) Nicola Franceschina	(Belgium) Simon van Vossel	(China) Guo Wei
2001	(South Korea) Lee Seung-jae	(South Korea) Min Ryoung	(China) Li Ye
2003	(South Korea) Song Kyung-taek	(Canada) Marc-André Monette	(South Korea) Lee Jae-kyung
2005	(South Korea) Ahn Hyun-soo	(South Korea) Song Suk-woo	(South Korea) Seo Ho-jin
2007	(South Korea) Sung Si-bak	(South Korea) Cho Nam-kyu	(South Korea) Lee Seung-hoon
2009	(South Korea) Lee Seung-hoon	(South Korea) Kim Seoung-il	(South Korea) Yun Tae-sik
2011	(South Korea) Kim Hwan-ee	(South Korea) Kim Tae-hoon	(South Korea) Kim Seoung-il
2013	(South Korea) Noh Jin-kyu	(South Korea) Um Cheon-ho	(Canada) Yoan Gauthier
2015	(South Korea) Park Se-yeong	(South Korea) Han Seung-soo	(China) Chen Guang
2017	(South Korea) Park Ji-won	(South Korea) Kim Do-kyoum	(Kazakhstan) Nurbergen Zhumagaziyev
2019	(China) An Kai	(France) Quentin Fercoq	(Japan) Kiichi Shigehiro
2023	(South Korea) Kim Tae-sung	(South Korea) Lee Jeong-min	(South Korea) Jang Sung-woo
2025	(South Korea) Kim Tae-sung	(South Korea) Lee Dong-hyun	(South Korea) Bae Seo-chan

==== 3000 m ====
Year	Gold	Silver	Bronze
1985	(Australia) Danny Kah	(Canada) Louis Grenier	(Canada) Michel Daignault
1987	not included in the program		
1989	(South Korea) Kim Ki-hoon	(South Korea) Lee Joon-ho	(South Korea) Mo Ji-soo
1991	(South Korea) Kim Ki-hoon	(Italy) Roberto Peretti	(South Korea) Mo Ji-soo
1993	(South Korea) Lee Joon-ho	(North Korea) Kim Chang-hwan	(South Korea) Park Sae-woo
1995	(South Korea) Chae Ji-hoon	(United States) Eric Flaim	(Japan) Satoru Terao
1997	(South Korea) Lee Ho-eung	(Japan) Satoru Terao	(China) Li Jiajun
1999	(France) Bruno Loscos	(Japan) Takafumi Nishitani	(Japan) Yuno Shinohara
2001	(South Korea) Lee Seung-jae	(South Korea) Min Ryoung	(China) Li Haonan
2003	(China) Ma Yunfeng	(Canada) Marc-André Monette	(Japan) Yoshiharu Arino
2005	(South Korea) Ahn Hyun-soo	(South Korea) Seo Ho-jin	(China) Sui Baoku
2007	(South Korea) Sung Si-bak	(South Korea) Lee Seung-hoon	(South Korea) Lee Hyeon-sung
2009	(South Korea) Lee Seung-hoon	(South Korea) Kim Seoung-il	(South Korea) Yun Tae-sik
2011-2025	not included in the program		

==== 5000 m relay ====
Year	Gold	Silver	Bronze
1985-1987	not included in the program		
1989	South Korea	China	United States
1991	Italy	United States	Canada
1993	South Korea	North Korea	United States
1995	South Korea	Japan	China
1997	South Korea	Japan	United States
1999	Japan	United States	China
2001	South Korea	Italy	Japan
2003	South Korea	Italy	China
2005	South Korea	China	Japan
2007	South Korea	China	Italy
2009	China	Canada	South Korea
2011	China	Canada	France
2013	Hungary	Canada	Russia
2015	China	Russia	France
2017	China	Russia	Kazakhstan
2019	South Korea	Russia	Kazakhstan
2023	South Korea	Kazakhstan	Netherlands
2025	China	Japan	Kazakhstan

=== Women ===
==== 500 m ====
Year	Gold	Silver	Bronze
1985	(United States) Becky Mane	(Canada) Susan Auch	(Canada) Maryse Perreault
1987	not included in the program		
1989	(Italy) Cristina Sciolla	(North Korea) Chong Hye-ral	(China) Guo Hongru
1991	(China) Li Changxiang	(United States) Amy Peterson	(China) Wang Xuemei
1993	(China) Wang Xiulan	(North Korea) Kim Chun-hwa	(North Korea) Hwang Ok-sil
1995	(China) Zhang Dongxiang	(China) Yang Yang	(South Korea) Chun Lee-kyung
1997	(China) Wang Chunlu	(Italy) Marinella Canclini	(China) Yang Yang (A)
1999	(Bulgaria) Evgenia Radanova	(China) Liu Xiaoying	(China) Cai Wei
2001	(Bulgaria) Evgenia Radanova	(China) Zhang Juju	(China) Liu Yunnuan
2003	(China) Cheng Xiaolei	(South Korea) Kim Hye-kyung	(South Korea) Jeon Da-hye
2005	(South Korea) Choi Eun-Kyung	(China) Zhu Mile	(France) Stephanie Bouvier
2007	(South Korea) Kim Hye-kyung	(China) Liu Cuijia	(Canada) Anne Maltais
2009	(China) Liu Qiuhong	(China) Li Wenwen	(China) Meng Xiaoxue
2011	(China) Xue Kong	(Canada) Valérie Lambert	(South Korea) Lee Eun-byul
2013	(China) Wang Xue	(Canada) Caroline Truchon	(Lithuania) Agnė Sereikaitė
2015	(China) Han Yutong	(South Korea) Son Ha-kyung	(Lithuania) Agnė Sereikaitė
2017	(China) Zang Yize	(China) Xu Aili	(South Korea) Kim A-lang
2019	(France) Aurélie Monvoisin	(Russia) Ekaterina Efremenkova	(South Korea) Park Ji-yun
2023	(South Korea) Choi Min-jeong	(China) Wang Yichao	(South Korea) Park Ji-yun
2025	(South Korea) Kim Gil-li	(China) Hao Weiying	(South Korea) Seo Whi-min

==== 1000 m ====
Year	Gold	Silver	Bronze
1985	(Canada) Susan Auch	(United States) Lydia Rosa Stephans	(Canada) Chantal Cote
1987	not included in the program		
1989	(China) Guo Hongru	(China) Li Jinyan	(Japan) Keiko Asai
1991	(North Korea) Hwang Ok-sil	(China) Li Changxiang	(Italy) Maria Rosa Candido
1993	(China) Wang Xiulan	(United States) Amy Peterson	(Italy) Maria Rosa Candido
1995	(China) Yang Yang (S)	(China) Zhang Dongxiang	(South Korea) Kim So-hee
1997	(South Korea) Kim So-hee	(China) Yang Yang (S)	(South Korea) Chun Lee-kyung
1999	(China) Cai Wei	(Japan) Ikue Teshigawara	(China) Liu Xiaoying
2001	(South Korea) Choi Min-kyung	(Bulgaria) Evgenia Radanova	(South Korea) An Sang-mi
2003	(China) Cheng Xiaolei	(Italy) Marta Capurso	(South Korea) Kim Hye-kyung
2005	(South Korea) Choi Eun-kyung	(South Korea) Yeo Soo-yeon	(South Korea) Cho Ha-ri
2007	(China) Liu Cuijia	(South Korea) Cho Ha-ri	(Italy) Marta Capurso
2009	(China) Liu Qiuhong	(China) Zhou Yang	(South Korea) Jung Ba-ra
2011	(South Korea) Lee Eun-byul	(South Korea) Kim Min-jung	(Japan) Marie Yoshida
2013	(China) Guo Yihan	(South Korea) Lee Eun-byul	(China) Tao Jiaying
2015	(South Korea) Kim A-lang	(South Korea) Lee Eun-byul	(South Korea) Son Ha-kyung
2017	(South Korea) Son Ha-kyung	(China) Xu Aili	(Japan) Ayame Nakano
2019	(South Korea) Kim A-lang	(France) Aurélie Monvoisin	(Russia) Ekaterina Efremenkova
2023	(South Korea) Choi Min-jeong	(Germany) Anna Seidel	(South Korea) Seo Whi-min
2025	(South Korea) Kim Gil-li	(South Korea) Seo Whi-min	(China) Hao Weiying

==== 1500 m ====
Year	Gold	Silver	Bronze
1985	(United States) Becky Mane	(Canada) Maryse Perreault	(Canada) Marie-Jose Martin
1987	not included in the program		
1989	(China) Guo Hongru	(Soviet Union) Marina Pylaeva	(China) Li Jinyan
1991	(North Korea) Kim Chun-hwa	(Italy) Maria Rosa Candido	(North Korea) Kim Jong-hui
1993	(United States) Amy Peterson	(North Korea) Hwang Ok-sil	(Italy) Maria Rosa Candido
1995	(South Korea) Chun Lee-kyung	(China) Zhang Dongxiang	(China) Yang Yang
1997	(China) Wang Chunlu	(Bulgaria) Evgenia Radanova	(Russia) Elena Tikhanina
1999	(Bulgaria) Evgenia Radanova	(China) Liu Xiaoying	(Japan) Ikue Teshigawara
2001	(South Korea) Choi Min-kyung	(Bulgaria) Evgenia Radanova	(China) Zhang Juju
2003	(China) Cheng Xiaolei	(China) Zhu Mile	(Italy) Marta Capurso
2005	(South Korea) Choi Eun-kyung	(South Korea) Yeo Soo-yeon	(China) Wang Wei
2007	(South Korea) Kim Hye-kyung	(South Korea) Cho Ha-ri	(China) Meng Xiaoxue
2009	(China) Zhou Yang	(China) Liu Qiuhong	(China) Sun Linlin
2011	(South Korea) Lee Eun-byul	(South Korea) Jung Ba-ra	(China) Li Jianrou
2013	(China) Tao Jiaying	(Hungary) Bernadett Heidum	(South Korea) Hwang Hyun-sun
2015	(South Korea) Kim A-lang	(South Korea) Lee Eun-byul	(China) Han Yutong
2017	(South Korea) Son Ha-kyung	(South Korea) Kim A-lang	(Japan) Moemi Kikuchi
2019	(South Korea) Kim A-lang	(France) Aurélie Monvoisin	(Russia) Ekaterina Efremenkova
2023	(South Korea) Choi Min-jeong	(South Korea) Kim Geon-hee	(South Korea) Seo Whi-min
2025	(South Korea) Kim Gil-li	(South Korea) Seo Whi-min	(South Korea) Kim Geon-hee

==== 3000 m ====
Year	Gold	Silver	Bronze
1985	(China) Zhan Huanli	(United States) Lydia Rosa Stephans	(Canada) Susan Auch
1987	not included in the program		
1989	(China) Li Jinyan	(Italy) Maria Rosa Candido	(Japan) Keiko Asai
1991	(North Korea) Hwang Ok-sil	(North Korea) Li Gyong-hui	(North Korea) Kim Chun-hwa
1993	(China) Zhang Chunyang	(China) Zhang Jing	(North Korea) Li Gyong-hui
1995	(South Korea) Kim So-hee	(South Korea) Chun Lee-kyung	(South Korea) Shin So-ja
1997	(South Korea) Chun Lee-kyung	(Italy) Marinella Canclini	(South Korea) Shin So-ja
1999	(China) Liu Xiaoying	(Japan) Sachi Ozawa	(China) Fu Tianyu
2001	(South Korea) An Sang-mi	(Bulgaria) Evgenia Radanova	(South Korea) Choi Min-kyung
2003	(China) Zhu Mile	(South Korea) Kim Hye-kyung	(Italy) Marta Capurso
2005	(South Korea) Choi Eun-kyung	(South Korea) Kim Min-jung	(South Korea) Cho Ha-ri
2007	(South Korea) Kang Yun-mi	(China) Sun Linlin	(South Korea) Hur Hee-been
2009	(South Korea) Choi Jung-won	(China) Liu Qiuhong	(South Korea) Kim Hye-kyung
2011-2025	not included in the program		

==== 3000 m relay ====
Year	Gold	Silver	Bronze
1985-1987	not included in the program		
1989	China	United States	North Korea
1991	China	Soviet Union	South Korea
1993	China	North Korea	United States
1995	China	South Korea	United States
1997	China	South Korea	Russia
1999	Bulgaria	China	Japan
2001	South Korea	China	Japan
2003	South Korea	China	Japan
2005	South Korea	Japan	China
2007	China	Japan	South Korea
2009	China	South Korea	Canada
2011	South Korea	China	Hungary
2013	South Korea	Russia	Hungary
2015	China	South Korea	Canada
2017	South Korea	China	Kazakhstan
2019	Russia	Japan	Kazakhstan
2023	South Korea	China	United States
2025	South Korea	China	France

=== Mixed ===
==== 2000 m Relay ====
Year	Gold	Silver	Bronze
2023	France	Kazakhstan	Japan
2025	South Korea	China	Kazakhstan

== Medal table ==
Last updated after the 2025 Winter World University Games

Rank	Nation	Gold	Silver	Bronze	Total
1	South Korea (KOR)	96	56	51	203
2	China (CHN)	48	38	39	125
3	Canada (CAN)	6	18	16	40
4	France (FRA)	5	5	4	14
5	Italy (ITA)	4	10	11	25
6	Bulgaria (BUL)	4	4	0	8
7	Japan (JPN)	3	12	18	33
8	United States (USA)	3	11	8	22
9	North Korea (PRK)	3	6	7	16
10	Russia (RUS)	1	5	7	13
11	Hungary (HUN)	1	1	2	4
12	Australia (AUS)	1	1	0	2
13	Netherlands (NED)	1	0	2	3
14	Kazakhstan (KAZ)	0	3	9	12
15	Great Britain (GBR)	0	2	0	2
15	Soviet Union (URS)	0	2	0	2
17	Belgium (BEL)	0	1	0	1
17	Germany (GER)	0	1	0	1
19	Lithuania (LTU)	0	0	2	2
Totals (19 entries)		176	176	176	528
