= Short-track speed skating at the 2020 Winter Youth Olympics =

Short track speed skating at the III Winter Youth Olympic Games
- Venue: CIG de Malley
- Dates: 18–22 January
- Competitors: 61 from 32 nations

Short track speed skating at the 2020 Winter Youth Olympics took place at the CIG de Malley in Lausanne, Switzerland from 18 to 22 January 2020.

== Medal summary ==
=== Medal table ===
Rank	Nation	Gold	Silver	Bronze	Total
1	South Korea	4	3	0	7
–	Mixed-NOCs	1	1	1	3
2	Netherlands	0	1	0	1
3	Canada	0	0	2	2
3	China	0	0	2	2
Totals (4 entries)		5	5	5	15

=== Events ===
Event	Gold		Silver		Bronze	
Boys' 500 metres	Lee Jeong-min; South Korea	40.772	Jang Sung-woo; South Korea	41.000	Zhang Tianyi; China	48.570
Boys' 1000 metres	Jang Sung-woo; South Korea	1:33.531	Lee Jeong-min; South Korea	1:33.646	Li Kongchao; China	1:33.851
Girls' 500 metres	Seo Whi-min; South Korea	43.483	Michelle Velzeboer; Netherlands	45.235	Florence Brunelle; Canada	45.314
Girls' 1000 metres	Seo Whi-min; South Korea	1:29.439	Kim Chan-seo; South Korea	1:29.538	Florence Brunelle; Canada	1:30.024
Mixed NOC team relay	Team B (MIX); Kim Chan-seo (KOR); Diede van Oorschot (NED); Shogo Miyata (JPN); Jonathan So (USA)	4:12.378	Team G (MIX); Iuliia Beresneva (RUS); Chang Hui (TPE); Jang Sung-woo (KOR); Gabriel Volet (FRA)	4:12.972	Team A (MIX); Olivia Weedon (GBR); Seo Whi-min (KOR); Thomas Nadalini (ITA); Ethan De Rose (NZL)	4:16.115

== Qualification ==
64 skaters (32 per gender) will qualify to compete. The top four countries ranked in the women's 500 metres and men's 1000 metres events at the 2019 World Junior Short Track Speed Skating Championships qualified two athletes for the respective gender. The rest of the spots were awarded one per NOC until the total quota was complete. The host nation has the right to enter one athlete in each event if not qualified.

Event		Quotas	Boys'	Girls'
2019 World Junior Short Track Speed Skating Championships	Top 4	2	China; Japan; Russia; South Korea	Netherlands; Poland; South Korea; United States
2019 World Junior Short Track Speed Skating Championships		1	Australia; Austria; Belgium; Bulgaria; Canada; Croatia; France; Germany; Great Britain; Hungary; Italy; Kazakhstan; Latvia; ~~Luxembourg~~; Malaysia; Netherlands; New Zealand; Philippines; Poland; ~~Serbia~~; Singapore; Slovenia; Switzerland; Chinese Taipei; Thailand; Ukraine; United States	~~Australia~~; Canada; China; Croatia; Czech Republic; France; Germany; Great Britain; Hungary; Italy; Japan; Kazakhstan; Latvia; Luxembourg; Malaysia; Russia; Serbia; Singapore; Slovakia; ~~Slovenia~~; ~~Sweden~~; Switzerland; Chinese Taipei; Ukraine
Total			32	29

- Switzerland did not qualify a male skater. However, as host nation is entitled to enter one male athlete. If the country chooses to do so, it would replace Bulgaria in the competition. Switzerland did decide to use its men's quota.
- Australia, Slovenia and Sweden declined girls' quotas. These spots were not reallocated.
- Luxembourg, Serbia and Slovenia did not use boys' quotas. These were reallocated to Bulgaria, Singapore and Croatia

=== Summary ===
A total of 32 countries qualified skaters.

NOC	Boys'	Girls'	Total
Australia	1		1
Austria	1		1
Belgium	1		1
Bulgaria	1		1
Canada	1	1	2
China	2	1	3
Croatia	1	1	2
Czech Republic		1	1
France	1	1	2
Germany	1	1	2
Great Britain	1	1	2
Hungary	1	1	2
Italy	1	1	2
Japan	2	1	3
Kazakhstan	1	1	2
Latvia	1	1	2
Luxembourg		1	1
Malaysia	1	1	2
Netherlands	1	2	3
New Zealand	1		1
Philippines	1		1
Poland	1	2	3
Russia	2	1	3
Serbia		1	1
Singapore	1	1	2
Slovakia		1	1
South Korea	2	2	4
Switzerland	1	1	2
Chinese Taipei	1	1	2
Thailand	1		1
Ukraine	1	1	2
United States	1	2	3
Total: 32 NOCs	32	29	61
