= Short-track speed skating at the 2020 Winter Youth Olympics – Boys' 1000 metres =

Boys' 1000 metres at the III Winter Youth Olympic Games
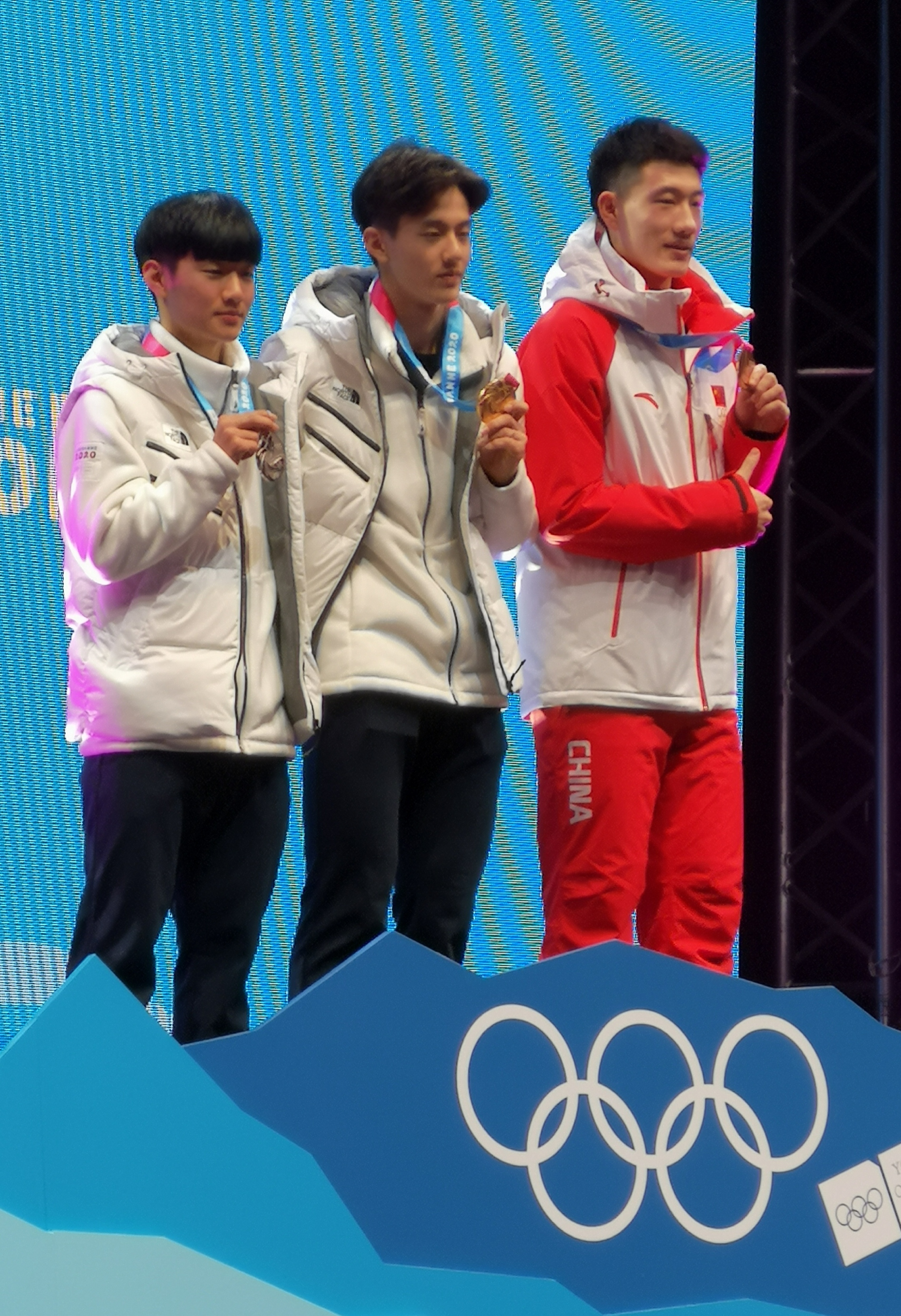
- Venue: Lausanne Skating Arena
- Dates: 18 January
- Competitors: 32 from 28 nations
- Winning time: 1:33.531

Medalists
1st place, gold medalist(s)		Jang Sung-woo	South Korea
2nd place, silver medalist(s)		Lee Jeong-min	South Korea
3rd place, bronze medalist(s)		Li Kongchao	China

The boys' 1000 metres in short track speed skating at the 2020 Winter Youth Olympics was held on 18 January at the Lausanne Skating Arena.

== Results ==
=== Heats ===
Q – qualified for the quarterfinals

Rank	Heat	Name	Country	Time	Notes
1	1	Kosei Hayashi	Japan	1:37.849	Q
2	1	Sanzhar Zhanissov	Kazakhstan	1:37.947	Q
3	1	Trevor Tan	Singapore	1:38.032	
4	1	Julian Macaraeg	Philippines	1:38.100	
1	2	Vladimir Balbekov	Russia	1:29.692	Q
2	2	Natthapat Kancharin	Thailand	1:30.038	Q
3	2	Sean Yeo	Malaysia	1:31.117	
4	2	Matt Gardner	Great Britain	1:33.305	
1	3	Daniil Nikolaev	Russia	1:32.620	Q
2	3	Danylo Fedorenko	Ukraine	1:33.042	Q
3	3	Gabriel Volet	France	1:33.083	
4	3	Tobias Wolf	Austria	1:34.496	
1	4	Ethan De Rose	New Zealand	1:34.230	Q
2	4	Félix Pigeon	Canada	1:34.547	Q
3	4	Stribor Suman	Croatia	1:36.199	
4	4	Till Schäfer	Germany	1:37.232	
1	5	Lee Jeong-min	South Korea	1:41.031	Q
2	5	Jenning de Boo	Netherlands	1:41.247	Q
3	5	Liao Wei-cheng	Chinese Taipei	1:43.625	
4	5	Mateusz Krzemiński	Poland	2:02.106	
1	6	Jonathan So	United States	1:30.428	Q
2	6	Kieran Guan	Australia	1:30.932	Q
3	6	Péter Jászapáti	Hungary	1:30.944	
4	6	Thibault Métraux	Switzerland	1:31.137	
1	7	Zhang Tianyi	China	1:27.261	Q
2	7	Jang Sung-woo	South Korea	1:27.573	Q
3	7	Warre Van Damme	Belgium	1:31.276	
4	7	Shogo Miyata	Japan	DNF	
1	8	Li Kongchao	China	1:32.916	Q
2	8	Thomas Nadalini	Italy	1:33.065	Q
3	8	Lubomir Kalchev	Bulgaria	1:33.231	
4	8	Māris Jānis Šternmanis	Latvia	1:38.222	

=== Quarterfinals ===
Q – qualified for the semifinals

Rank	Heat	Name	Country	Time	Notes
1	1	Jang Sung-woo	South Korea	1:34.626	Q
2	1	Lee Jeong-min	South Korea	1:34.714	Q
3	1	Zhang Tianyi	China	1:34.762	
4	1	Jenning de Boo	Netherlands	1:35.114	
1	2	Vladimir Balbekov	Russia	1:31.256	Q
2	2	Kosei Hayashi	Japan	1:31.554	Q
3	2	Sanzhar Zhanissov	Kazakhstan	1:32.521	
4	2	Natthapat Kancharin	Thailand	1:49.235	
1	3	Li Kongchao	China	1:31.134	Q
2	3	Daniil Nikolaev	Russia	1:31.496	Q
3	3	Thomas Nadalini	Italy	1:31.728	
4	3	Danylo Fedorenko	Ukraine	1:32.144	
1	4	Jonathan So	United States	1:31.616	Q
2	4	Ethan De Rose	New Zealand	1:31.751	Q
3	4	Félix Pigeon	Canada	1:31.925	
4	4	Kieran Guan	Australia	1:33.258	

=== Semifinals ===
QA – qualified for Final A
QB – qualified for Final B

Rank	Heat	Name	Country	Time	Notes
1	1	Li Kongchao	China	1:31.705	QA
2	1	Jonathan So	United States	1:31.810	QA
3	1	Kosei Hayashi	Japan	1:32.308	QB
4	1	Ethan De Rose	New Zealand	1:33.167	QB
1	2	Jang Sung-woo	South Korea	1:45.114	QA
2	2	Lee Jeong-min	South Korea	1:45.220	QA
3	2	Vladimir Balbekov	Russia	1:45.319	QB
4	2	Daniil Nikolaev	Russia	1:45.468	QB

=== Final B ===
Rank	Name	Country	Time	Notes
5	Vladimir Balbekov	Russia	1:36.157	
6	Daniil Nikolaev	Russia	1:36.555	
7	Ethan De Rose	New Zealand	1:36.892	
8	Kosei Hayashi	Japan	1:36.969	

=== Final A ===
The final A was held at 13:51.

Rank	Name	Country	Time	Notes
1st place, gold medalist(s)	Jang Sung-woo	South Korea	1:33.531	
2nd place, silver medalist(s)	Lee Jeong-min	South Korea	1:33.646	
3rd place, bronze medalist(s)	Li Kongchao	China	1:33.851	
4	Jonathan So	United States	1:33.896	
