= Short-track speed skating at the 2020 Winter Youth Olympics – Mixed team relay =

Mixed NOC team relay at the III Winter Youth Olympic Games
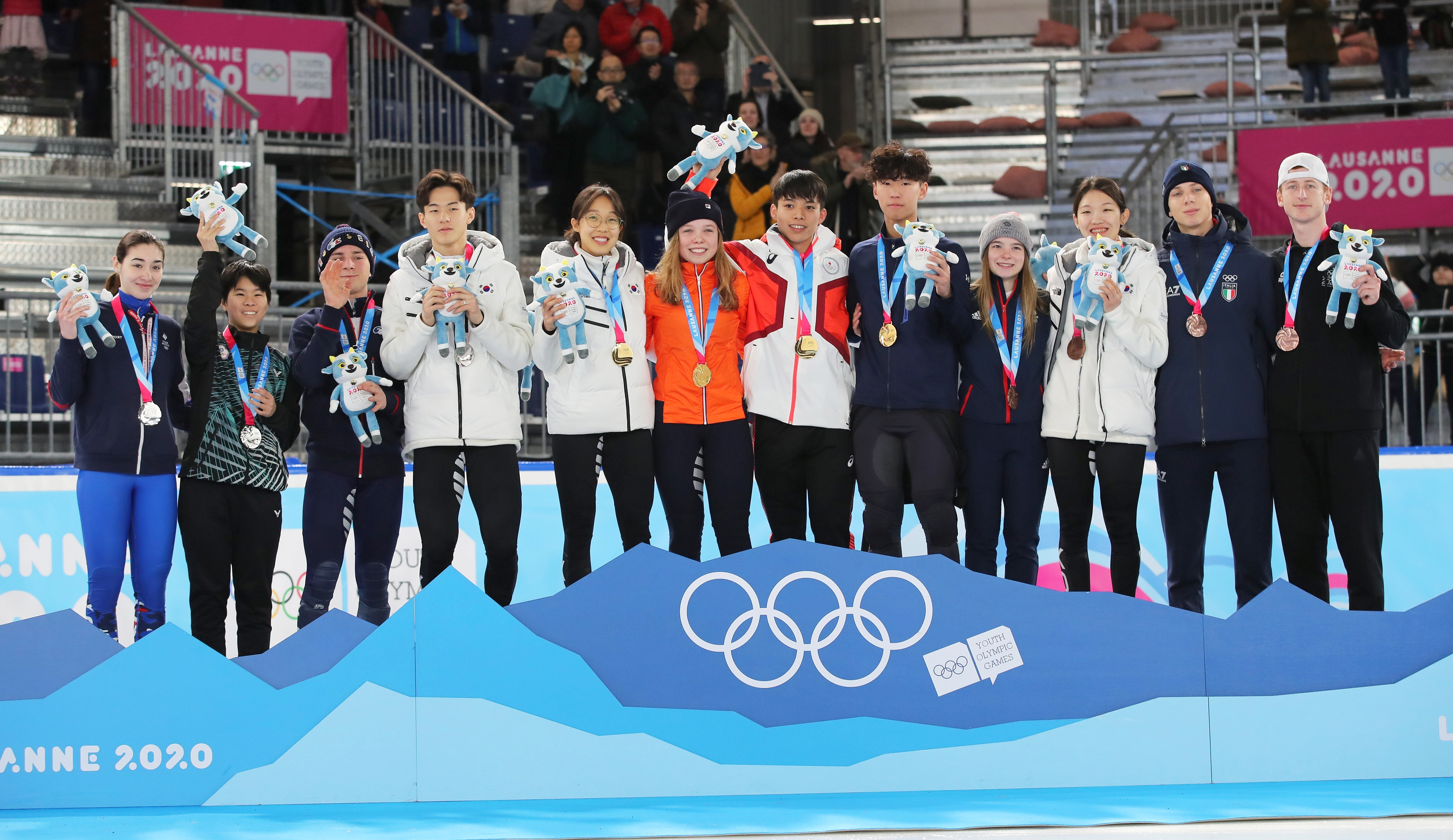
- Venue: Lausanne Skating Arena
- Dates: 22 January
- Competitors: 32 from 18 nations
- Teams: 8
- Winning time: 4:12.378

Medalists
1st place, gold medalist(s)		Kim Chan-seo; Diede van Oorschot; Shogo Miyata; Jonathan So	Mixed-NOCs
2nd place, silver medalist(s)		Iuliia Beresneva; Chang Hui; Jang Sung-woo; Gabriel Volet	Mixed-NOCs
3rd place, bronze medalist(s)		Olivia Weedon; Seo Whi-min; Thomas Nadalini; Ethan De Rose	Mixed-NOCs

The mixed NOC team relay in short track speed skating at the 2020 Winter Youth Olympics was held on 22 January at the Lausanne Skating Arena.

== Results ==
=== Semifinals ===
QA – qualified for Final A
QB – qualified for Final B

Rank	Semifinal	Team	Time	Notes
1	1	Team G Iuliia Beresneva (RUS); Chang Hui (TPE); Jang Sung-woo (KOR); Gabriel Volet (FRA)	4:11.042	QA
2	1	Team A Olivia Weedon (GBR); Seo Whi-min (KOR); Thomas Nadalini (ITA); Ethan De Rose (NZL)	4:15.427	QA
3	1	Team C Florence Brunelle (CAN); Anna Ruysschaert (LUX); Kosei Hayashi (JPN); Daniil Nikolaev (RUS)	4:15.601	QB
4	1	Team E Haruna Nagamori (JPN); Petra Rusnáková (SVK); Li Kongchao (CHN); Julian Macaraeg (PHI)	4:22.054	QB
1	2	Team B Kim Chan-seo (KOR); Diede van Oorschot (NED); Shogo Miyata (JPN); Jonathan So (USA)	4:11.095	QA
2	2	Team F Barbara Somogyi (HUN); Elisa Confortola (ITA); Félix Pigeon (CAN); Vladimir Balbekov (RUS)	4:11.169	QA
3	2	Team D Michelle Velzeboer (NED); Jenell Berhorst (USA); Zhang Tianyi (CHN); Sanzhar Zhanissov (KAZ)	4:13.578	QB
4	2	Team H Zhang Chutong (CHN); Hailey Choi (USA); Lee Jeong-min (KOR); Natthapat Kancharin (THA)	4:31.666	QB

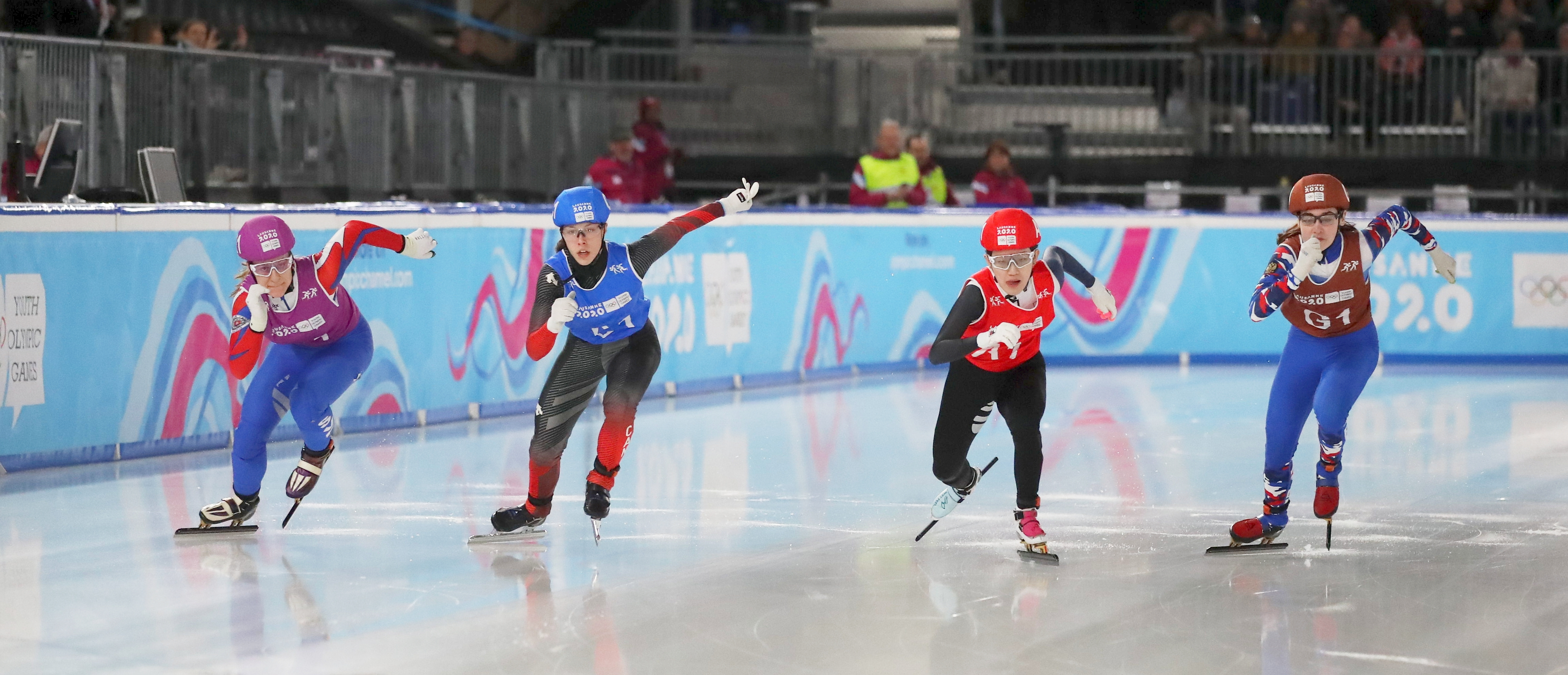
Start of Semifinal 1

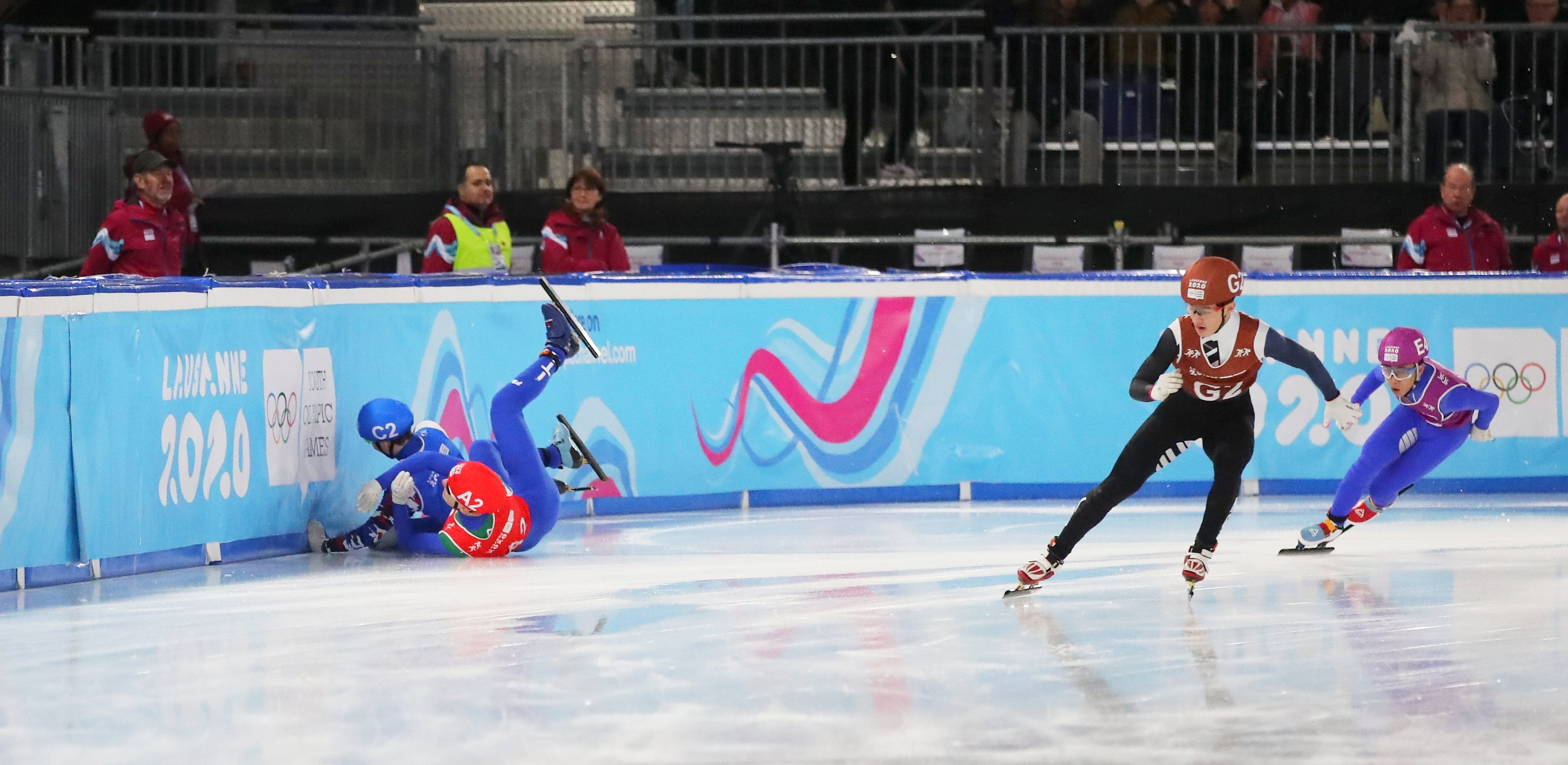
Crash in Semifinal 1

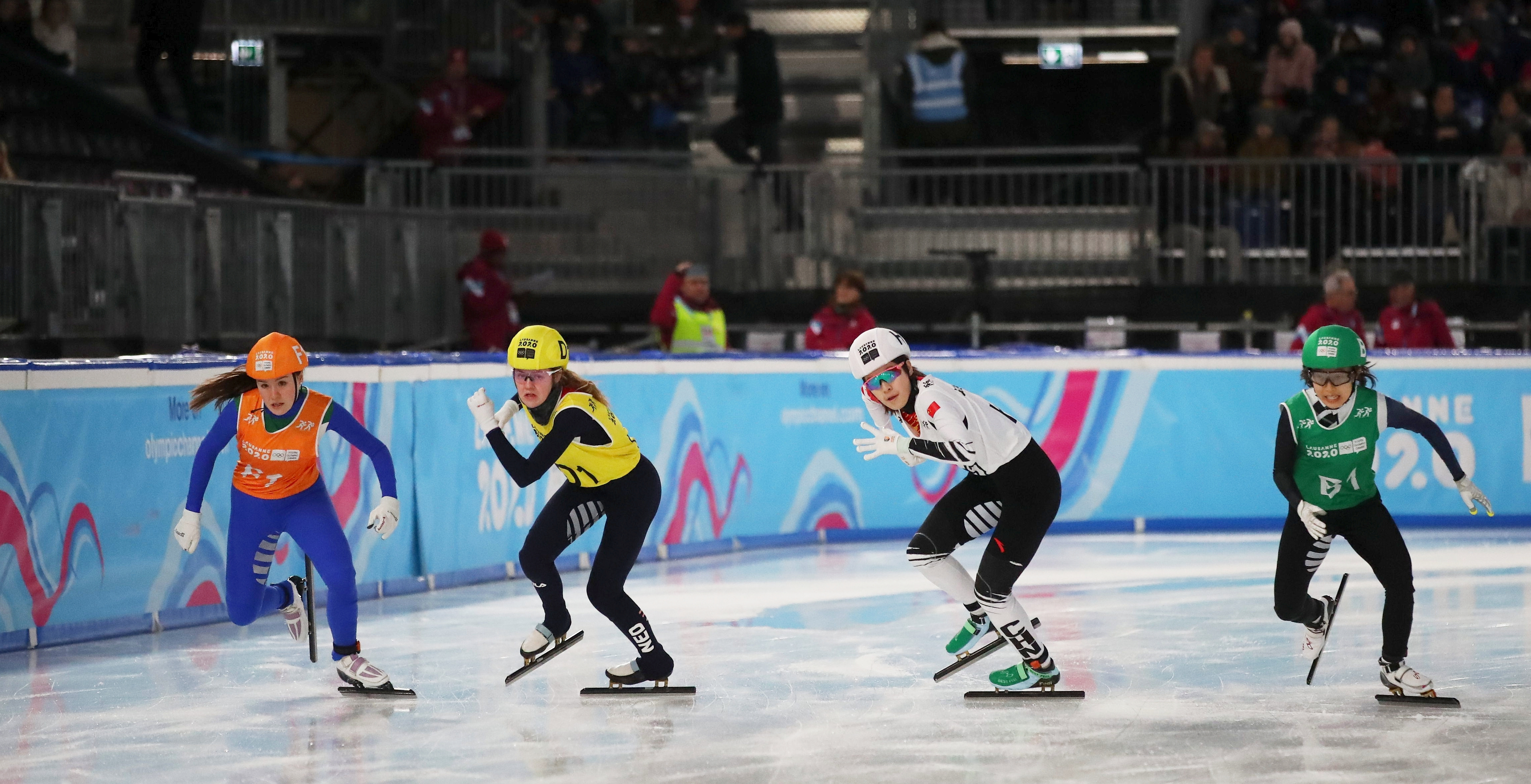
Start of Semifinal 2

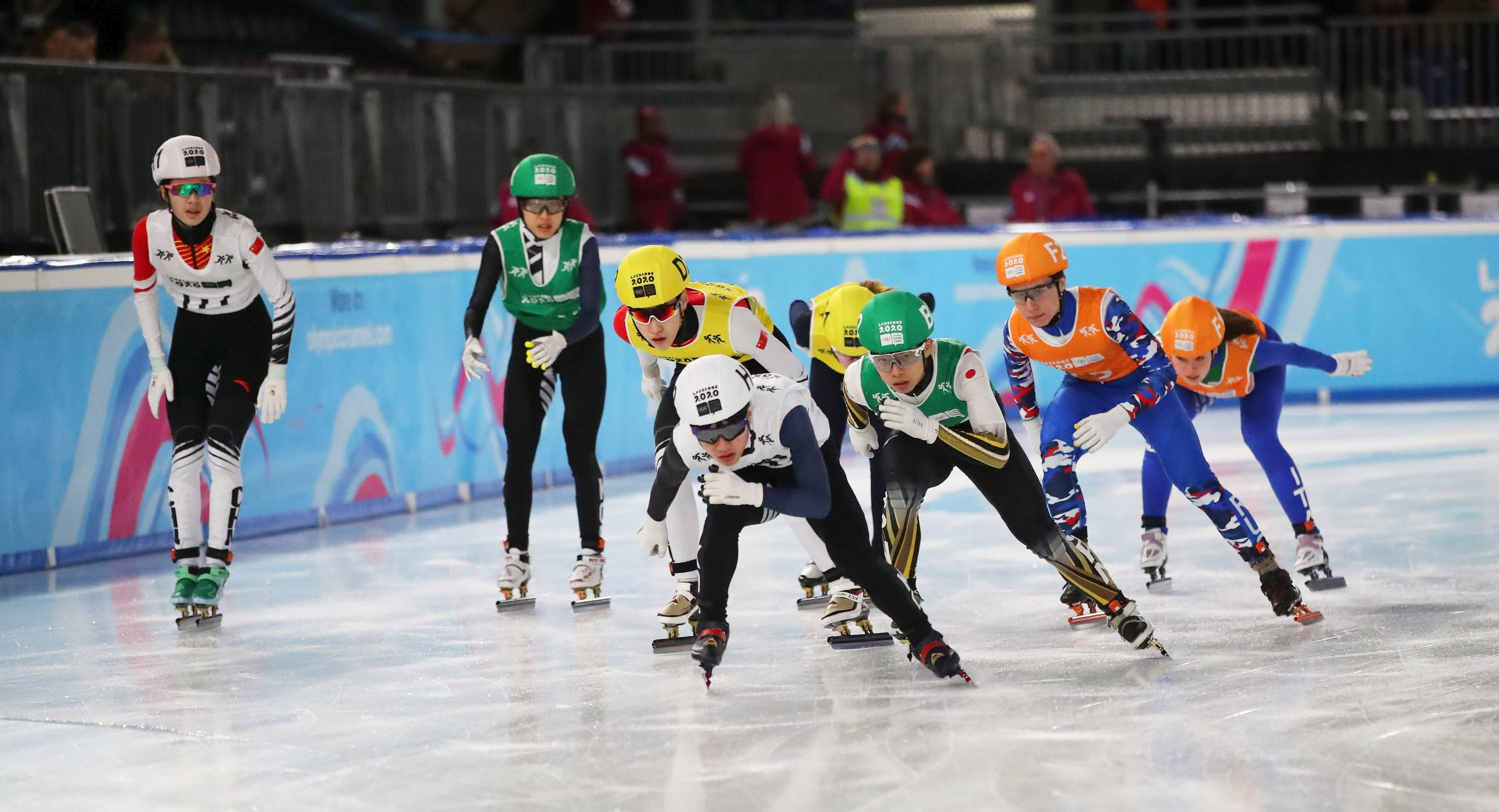
Changeover from girls to boys in Semifinal 2

=== Final B ===
PEN – penalty

Rank	Team	Time	Notes
5	Team H Zhang Chutong (CHN); Hailey Choi (USA); Lee Jeong-min (KOR); Natthapat Kancharin (THA)	4:15.234	
6	Team C Florence Brunelle (CAN); Anna Ruysschaert (LUX); Kosei Hayashi (JPN); Daniil Nikolaev (RUS)	4:16.893	
	Team E Haruna Nagamori (JPN); Petra Rusnáková (SVK); Li Kongchao (CHN); Julian Macaraeg (PHI)	PEN	
	Team D Michelle Velzeboer (NED); Jenell Berhorst (USA); Zhang Tianyi (CHN); Sanzhar Zhanissov (KAZ)	PEN	

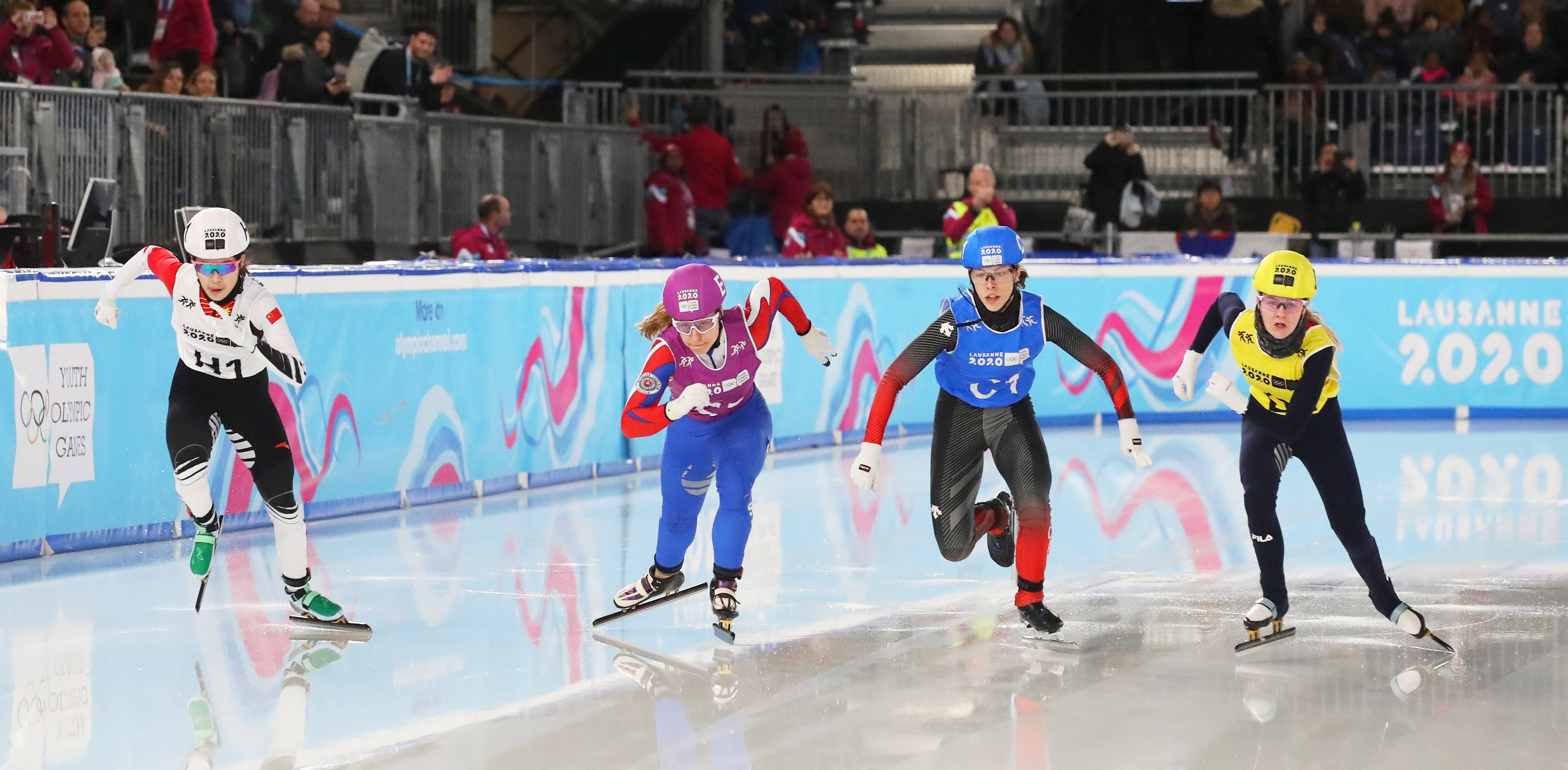
Start of the girls

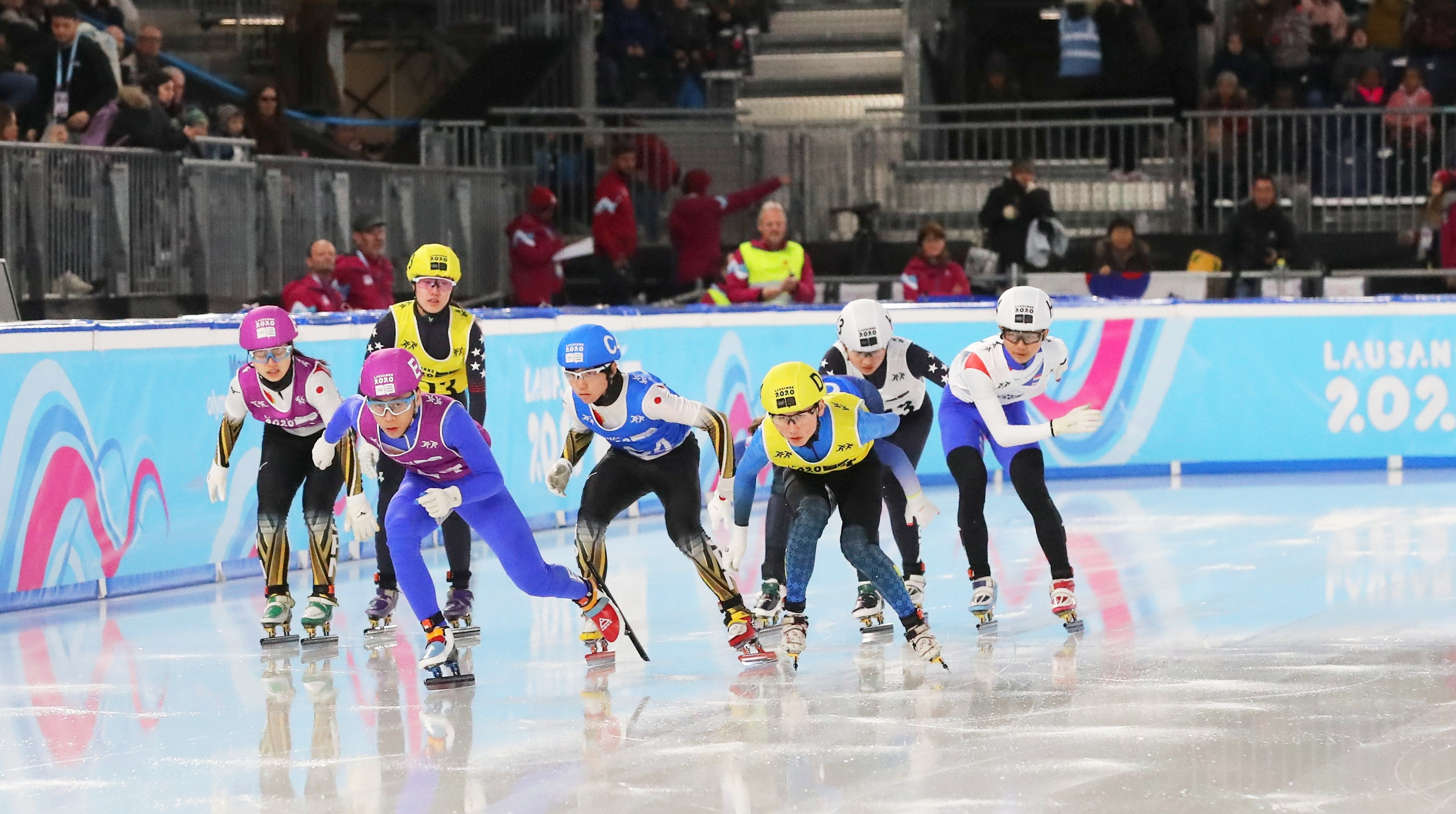
Changeover from girls to boys

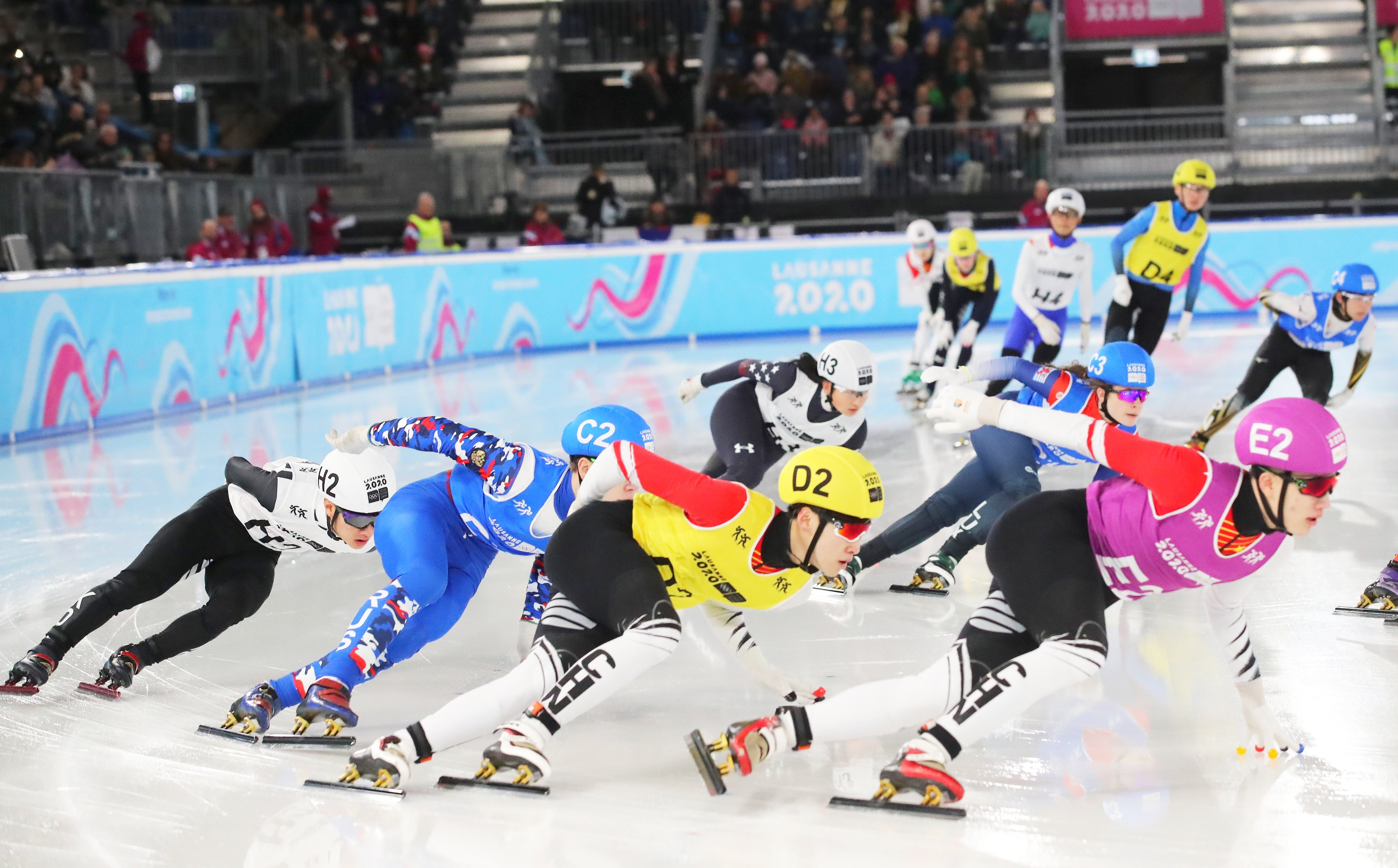
Boys skating in the curve

=== Final A ===
The final A was held at 10:37.

Rank	Team	Time	Notes
1st place, gold medalist(s)	Team B Kim Chan-seo (KOR); Diede van Oorschot (NED); Shogo Miyata (JPN); Jonathan So (USA)	4:12.378	
2nd place, silver medalist(s)	Team G Iuliia Beresneva (RUS); Chang Hui (TPE); Jang Sung-woo (KOR); Gabriel Volet (FRA)	4:12.972	
3rd place, bronze medalist(s)	Team A Olivia Weedon (GBR); Seo Whi-min (KOR); Thomas Nadalini (ITA); Ethan De Rose (NZL)	4:16.115	
4	Team F Barbara Somogyi (HUN); Elisa Confortola (ITA); Félix Pigeon (CAN); Vladimir Balbekov (RUS)	4:22.471	

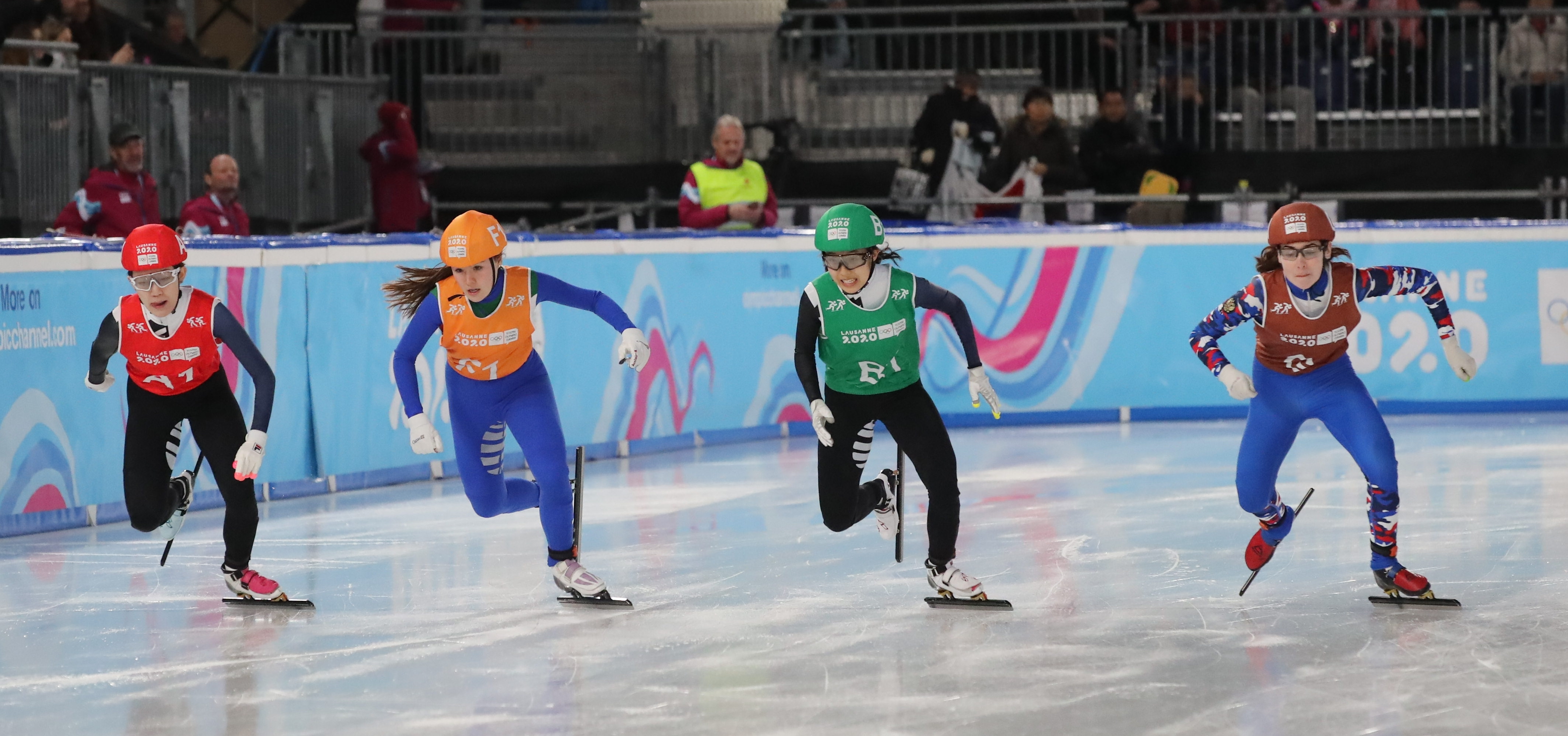
Start of the girls

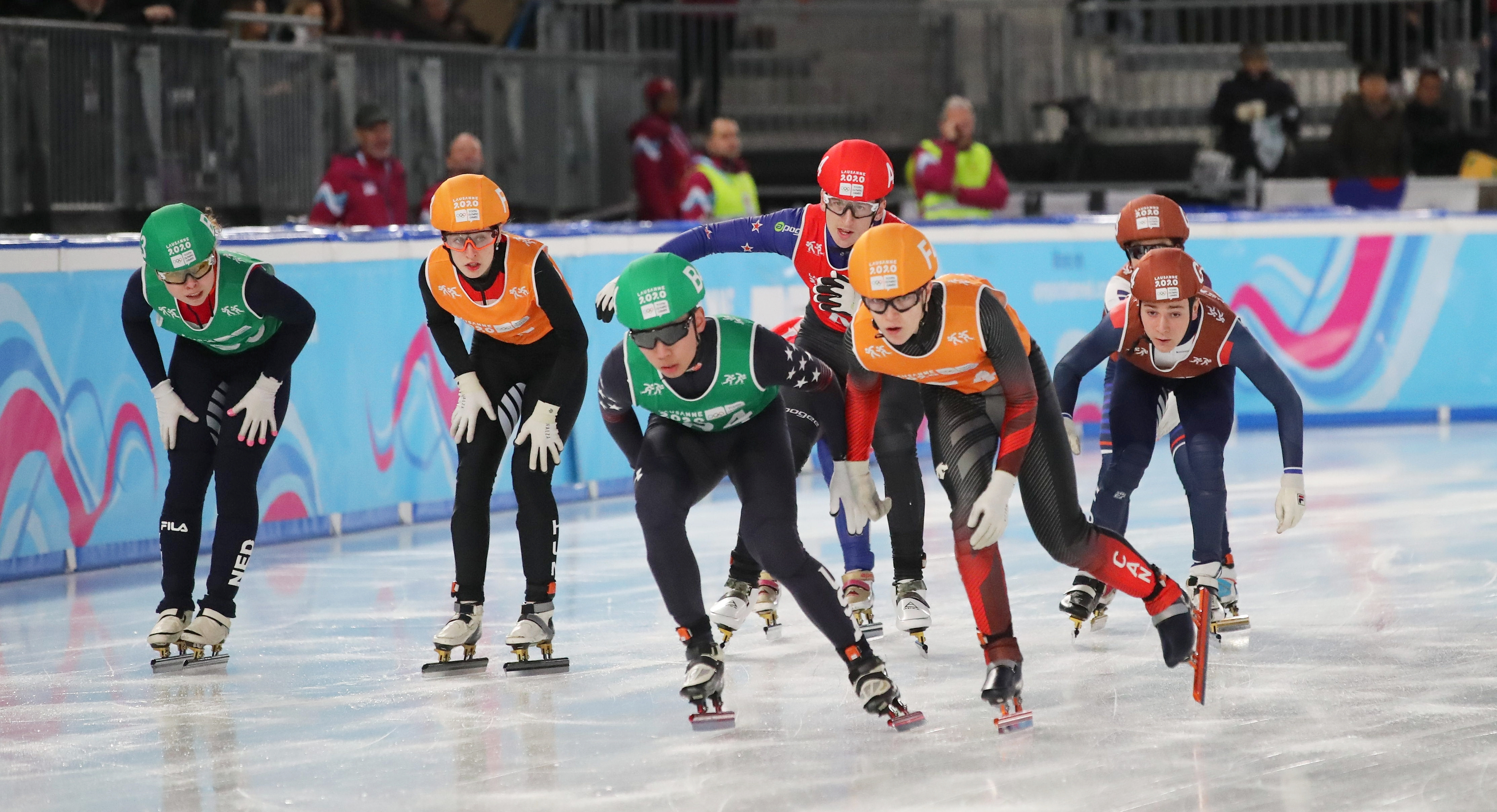
Changeover from girls to boys

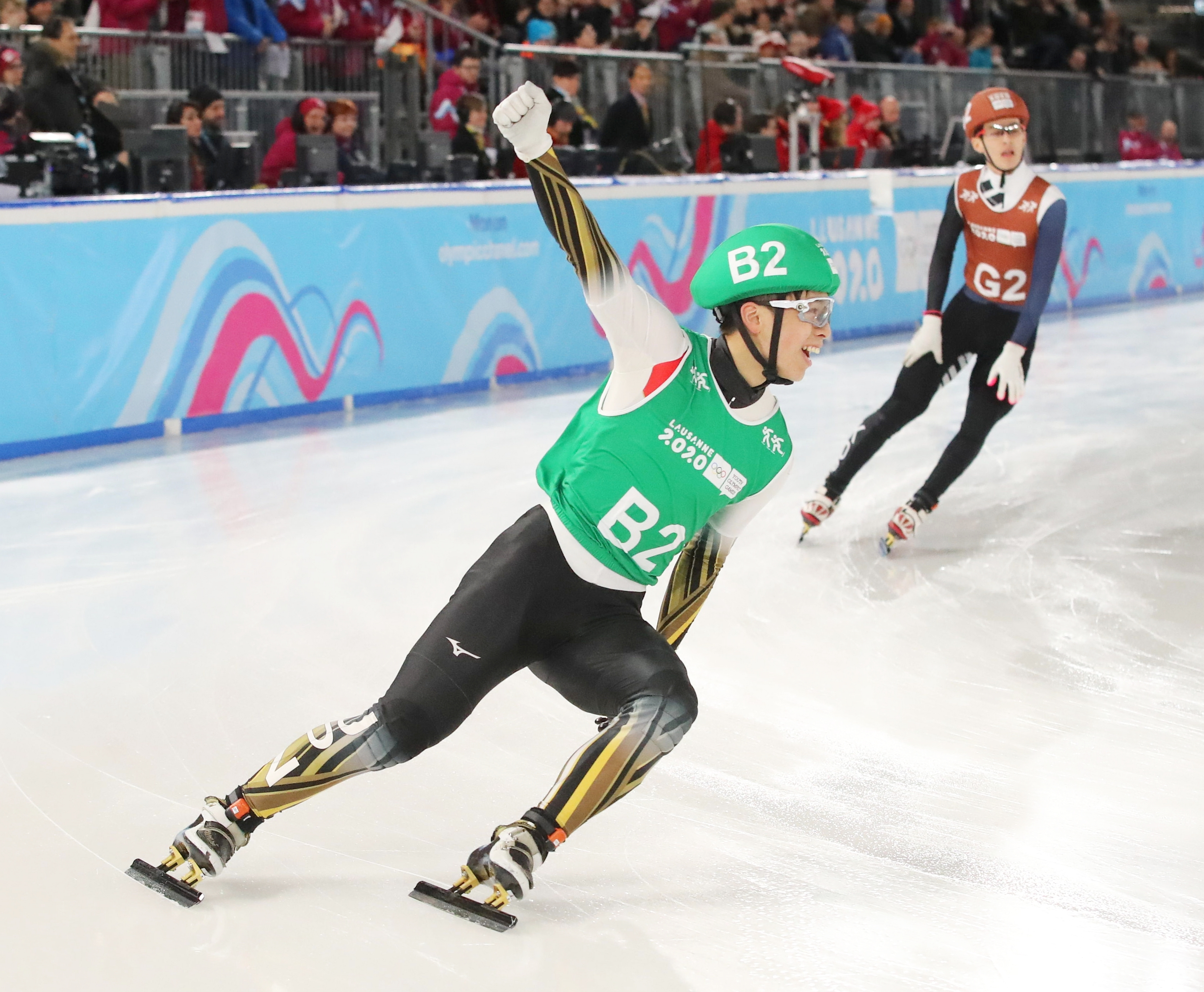
Shogo Miyata celebrates the victory of his team
