= Chun-hwa =

- Hangul: 춘화
- RR: Chunhwa
- MR: Ch'unhwa

Chun-hwa is a Korean given name.

== People ==
People with this name include:

- Kim Chun-hwa (born 1974), North Korean short track speed skater
- Ryang Chun-hwa (born 1991), North Korean weightlifter
- Pak Chun-hwa, North Korean politician

Fictional characters with this name include:

- Ha Chun-hwa, in 2011 South Korean film Sunny

== See also ==
- List of Korean given names
