= Short-track speed skating at the 2020 Winter Youth Olympics – Boys' 500 metres =

Boys' 500 metres at the III Winter Youth Olympic Games
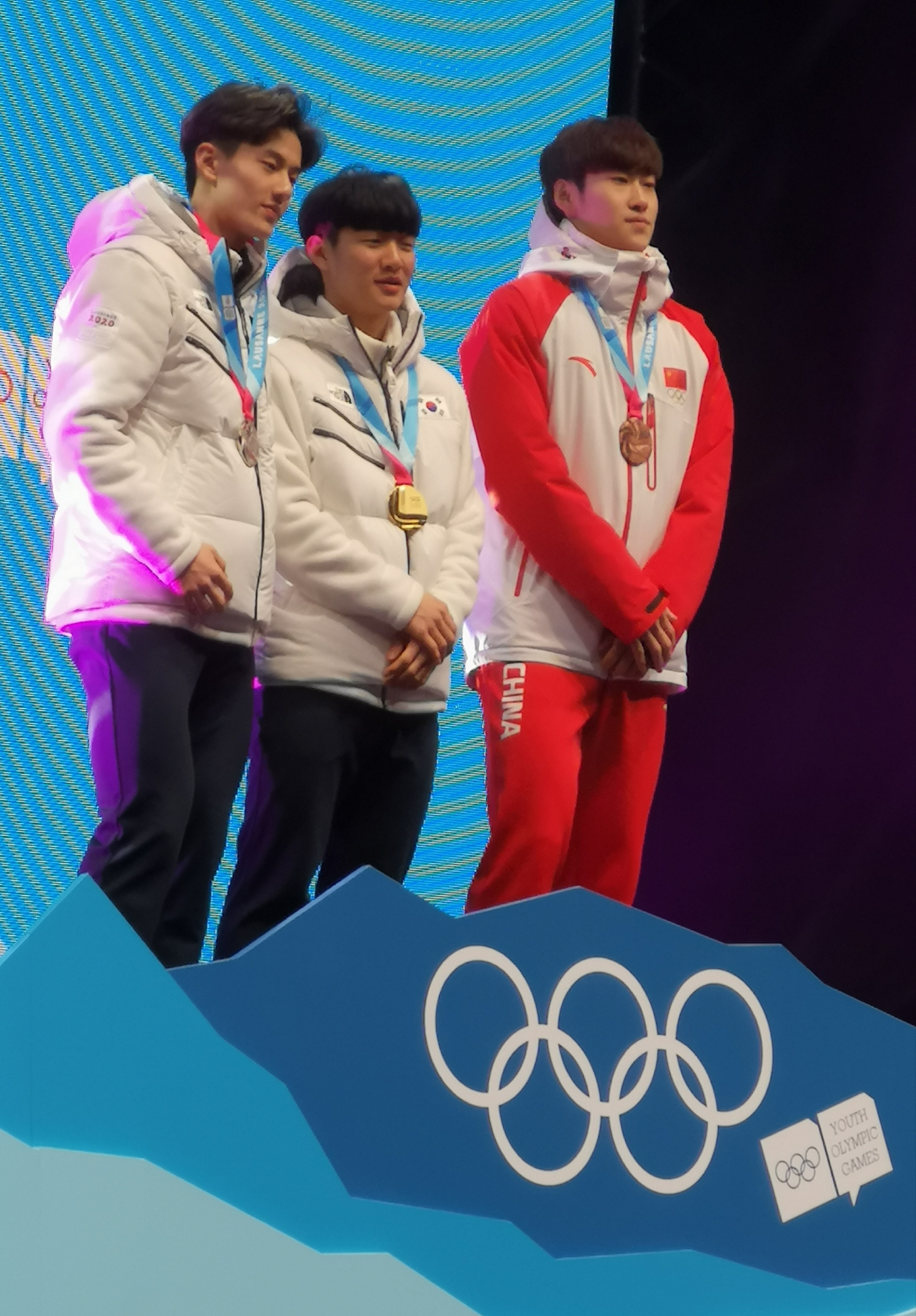
- Venue: Lausanne Skating Arena
- Dates: 20 January
- Competitors: 32 from 28 nations
- Winning time: 40.772

Medalists
1st place, gold medalist(s)		Lee Jeong-min	South Korea
2nd place, silver medalist(s)		Jang Sung-woo	South Korea
3rd place, bronze medalist(s)		Zhang Tianyi	China

The boys' 500 metres in short track speed skating at the 2020 Winter Youth Olympics was held on 20 January at the Lausanne Skating Arena.

== Results ==
=== Heats ===
Q – qualified for the quarterfinals
PEN – penalty

Rank	Heat	Name	Country	Time	Notes
1	1	Julian Macaraeg	Philippines	43.235	Q
2	1	Péter Jászapáti	Hungary	43.496	Q
3	1	Liao Wei-cheng	Chinese Taipei	44.147	
4	1	Stribor Suman	Croatia	DNF	
1	2	Jang Sung-woo	South Korea	42.070	Q
2	2	Sanzhar Zhanissov	Kazakhstan	43.141	Q
3	2	Mateusz Krzemiński	Poland	43.245	
4	2	Till Schäfer	Germany	44.292	
1	3	Shogo Miyata	Japan	41.605	Q
2	3	Thomas Nadalini	Italy	41.929	Q
3	3	Félix Pigeon	Canada	42.140	
4	3	Tobias Wolf	Austria	45.338	
1	4	Lee Jeong-min	South Korea	41.625	Q
2	4	Kosei Hayashi	Japan	43.912	Q
3	4	Sean Yeo	Malaysia	44.026	
	4	Jonathan So	United States	PEN	
1	5	Vladimir Balbekov	Russia	41.828	Q
2	5	Gabriel Volet	France	42.812	Q
3	5	Danylo Fedorenko	Ukraine	44.844	
4	5	Kieran Guan	Australia	53.958	
1	6	Ethan De Rose	New Zealand	43.280	Q
2	6	Trevor Tan	Singapore	43.424	Q
3	6	Warre Van Damme	Belgium	43.829	
4	6	Matt Gardner	Great Britain	45.460	
1	7	Zhang Tianyi	China	41.263	Q
2	7	Natthapat Kancharin	Thailand	43.008	Q
3	7	Thibault Métraux	Switzerland	45.226	
4	7	Lubomir Kalchev	Bulgaria	DNF	
1	8	Li Kongchao	China	41.722	Q
2	8	Daniil Nikolaev	Russia	41.820	Q
3	8	Jenning de Boo	Netherlands	41.973	
4	8	Māris Jānis Šternmanis	Latvia	47.046	

=== Quarterfinals ===
Q – qualified for the semifinals
YC – yellow card

Rank	Heat	Name	Country	Time	Notes
1	1	Lee Jeong-min	South Korea	40.972	Q
2	1	Jang Sung-woo	South Korea	41.040	Q
3	1	Gabriel Volet	France	43.583	
	1	Trevor Tan	Singapore	YC	
1	2	Zhang Tianyi	China	40.614	Q
2	2	Daniil Nikolaev	Russia	41.334	Q
3	2	Ethan De Rose	New Zealand	42.689	
4	2	Kosei Hayashi	Japan	42.878	
1	3	Shogo Miyata	Japan	41.662	Q
2	3	Thomas Nadalini	Italy	41.926	Q
3	3	Julian Macaraeg	Philippines	42.046	
4	3	Péter Jászapáti	Hungary	42.357	
1	4	Vladimir Balbekov	Russia	41.357	Q
2	4	Li Kongchao	China	41.524	Q
3	4	Sanzhar Zhanissov	Kazakhstan	42.973	
4	4	Natthapat Kancharin	Thailand	DNF	

=== Semifinals ===
QA – qualified for Final A
QB – qualified for Final B

Rank	Heat	Name	Country	Time	Notes
1	1	Vladimir Balbekov	Russia	41.399	QA
2	1	Lee Jeong-min	South Korea	41.454	QA
3	1	Daniil Nikolaev	Russia	41.613	QB
4	1	Li Kongchao	China	41.639	QB
1	2	Zhang Tianyi	China	40.908	QA
2	2	Jang Sung-woo	South Korea	40.989	QA
3	2	Shogo Miyata	Japan	41.663	QB
4	2	Thomas Nadalini	Italy	43.147	QB

=== Final B ===
Rank	Name	Country	Time	Notes
5	Daniil Nikolaev	Russia	42.266	
6	Shogo Miyata	Japan	42.386	
7	Li Kongchao	China	42.419	
8	Thomas Nadalini	Italy	42.553	

=== Final A ===
The final A was held at 15:20.

Rank	Name	Country	Time	Notes
1st place, gold medalist(s)	Lee Jeong-min	South Korea	40.772	
2nd place, silver medalist(s)	Jang Sung-woo	South Korea	41.000	
3rd place, bronze medalist(s)	Zhang Tianyi	China	48.570	
4	Vladimir Balbekov	Russia	56.847	
