= Ekaterina Efremenkova =

Russian short-track speed skater (born 1997)

- Efremenkova in 2018

Personal information
- Nationality: Russian
- Born: 31 December 1997 (age 28) Chelyabinsk, Russia
- Height: 1.68 m (5 ft 6 in)
- Weight: 58 kg (128 lb)

Sport
- Country: Russia
- Sport: Short track speed skating
- Event(s): 500 m, 1000 m, 1500 m
- Club: Lidia Skoblikova Speed Skating Sports School of Olympic Reserve
Medal record
Women's short track speed skating
Representing Russia
World Championships
| Silver medal – second place | 2019 Sofia | 3000 m relay |
| Bronze medal – third place | 2016 Seoul | 3000 m relay |
European Championships
| Gold medal – first place | 2018 Dresden | 3000 m relay |
| Silver medal – second place | 2019 Dordrecht | 3000 m relay |
| Bronze medal – third place | 2020 Debrecen | 3000 m relay |
Winter Universiade
| Gold medal – first place | 2019 Krasnoyarsk | 3000 m relay |
| Silver medal – second place | 2019 Krasnoyarsk | 500 m |
| Bronze medal – third place | 2019 Krasnoyarsk | 1000 m |
| Bronze medal – third place | 2019 Krasnoyarsk | 1500 m |

Ekaterina Olegovna Efremenkova (Russian: Екатерина Олеговна Ефременкова; born 31 December 1997) is a Russian short track speed skater. She won a bronze medal in the 3,000 meters relay at the 2016 World Short Track Speed Skating Championships.

== World Cup podiums ==
| Date | Season | Location | Rank | Event |
|---|---|---|---|---|
| 14 February 2016 | 2015–16 | Dordrecht | 2nd place, silver medalist(s) | 1500 m |
| 12 February 2017 | 2016–17 | Minsk | 2nd place, silver medalist(s) | 1500 m |
| 1 October 2017 | 2017–18 | Budapest | 3rd place, bronze medalist(s) | 3000 m relay |
| 19 November 2017 | 2017–18 | Seoul | 2nd place, silver medalist(s) | 3000 m relay |
| 3 November 2018 | 2018–19 | Calgary | 3rd place, bronze medalist(s) | 1500 m |
| 4 November 2018 | 2018–19 | Calgary | 1st place, gold medalist(s) | 3000 m relay |
| 11 November 2018 | 2018–19 | Salt Lake City | 2nd place, silver medalist(s) | 3000 m relay |
| 8 December 2018 | 2018–19 | Almaty | 2nd place, silver medalist(s) | 1500 m |
| 3 February 2019 | 2018–19 | Dresden | 1st place, gold medalist(s) | 3000 m relay |
| 10 February 2019 | 2018–19 | Turin | 1st place, gold medalist(s) | 2000 m mixed relay |

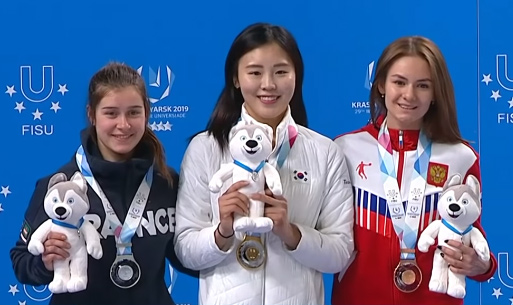
Aurélie Monvoisin (left), Kim A-lang (centre) and Ekaterina Efremenkova (right), in speed skating short track 1500m, 29th Winter Universiade (2019), Krasnoyarsk, Russia
