= 2022 World Short Track Speed Skating Championships =

Speed skating competition

- Venue: Maurice Richard Arena
- Location: Montréal, Canada
- Dates: April 8–10

Champions
- Men: (Hungary) Shaoang Liu
- Women: (South Korea) Choi Min-jeong

The 2022 World Short Track Speed Skating Championships were the 46th edition, held from April 8 to 10, 2022 at Maurice Richard Arena in Montreal, Canada. World Short Track Speed Skating Championships have been contested since 1976.

Due to the COVID-19 pandemic, the event was moved back three weeks from the original dates of March 18 to 20.

== Schedule ==
All times are local (UTC−4).

Date	Event
April 8	Qualifying
9 April	1500 m women
9 April	1500 m men
9 April	500 m women
9 April	500 m men
10 April	1000 m women
10 April	1000 m men
10 April	3000 m women
10 April	3000 m men
10 April	3000 m relay women
10 April	5000 m relay men

== Medal summary ==
=== Medal table ===
* Host nation (Canada)

Rank	Nation	Gold	Silver	Bronze	Total
1	South Korea	5	1	3	9
2	Hungary	4	0	0	4
3	Netherlands	1	1	4	6
4	Canada*	0	7	1	8
5	France	0	1	0	1
6	Belgium	0	0	2	2
Totals (6 entries)		10	10	10	30

=== Men ===
Event	Gold		Silver		Bronze	
Overall	Shaoang Liu; Hungary	104 points	Pascal Dion; Canada	63 points	Lee June-seo; South Korea	55 points
500 m	Shaoang Liu; Hungary	40.573	Quentin Fercoq; France	40.674	Stijn Desmet; Belgium	40.710
1000 m	Shaoang Liu; Hungary	1:25.462	Lee June-seo; South Korea	1:25.529	Kwak Yoon-gy; South Korea	1:25.662
1500 m	Shaoang Liu; Hungary	2:15.096	Pascal Dion; Canada	2:15.644	Stijn Desmet; Belgium	2:15.716
5000 m relay	South Korea; Han Seung-soo; Kwak Yoon-gy; Lee June-seo; Park In-wook	6:56.709	Netherlands; Itzhak de Laat; Friso Emons; Sjinkie Knegt; Sven Roes	6:56.786	Canada; Pascal Dion; Steven Dubois; Charles Hamelin; Jordan Pierre-Gilles; Maxime Laoun	6:56.807

=== Women ===
Event	Gold		Silver		Bronze	
Overall	Choi Min-jeong; South Korea	107 points	Kim Boutin; Canada	84 points	Xandra Velzeboer; Netherlands	53 points
500 m	Xandra Velzeboer; Netherlands	42.476	Kim Boutin; Canada	42.570	Yara van Kerkhof; Netherlands	42.642
1000 m	Choi Min-jeong; South Korea	1:27.956	Kim Boutin; Canada	1:28.076	Xandra Velzeboer; Netherlands	1:29.144
1500 m	Choi Min-jeong; South Korea	2:23.594	Kim Boutin; Canada	2:24.201	Seo Whi-min; South Korea	2:24.455
3000 m relay	South Korea; Choi Min-jeong; Kim A-lang; Seo Whi-min; Shim Suk-hee; Park Ji-yun	4:09.683	Canada; Kim Boutin; Florence Brunelle; Alyson Charles; Courtney Sarault; Danaé Blais	4:09.717	Netherlands; Rianne De Vries; Selma Poutsma; Yara van Kerkhof; Xandra Velzeboer	4:09.779

== Nations ==
The following nations sent skaters to these Championships. Due to the Russian invasion of Ukraine, skaters representing Russia or Belarus were not allowed to participate.

1. Australia
2. Austria
3. Belgium
4. Bosnia and Herzegovina
5. Bulgaria
6. Canada
7. Croatia
8. Czech Republic
9. France
10. Germany
11. Great Britain
12. Hungary
13. Ireland
14. Israel
15. Italy
16. Latvia
17. Netherlands
18. Philippines
19. Poland
20. Serbia
21. Singapore
22. Slovenia
23. South Korea
24. Switzerland
25. Turkey
26. Ukraine
27. United States
