= Luxembourg at the 2020 Winter Youth Olympics =

- IOC code: LUX
- NOC: Luxembourg Olympic and Sporting Committee
- Website: teamletzebuerg.lu

in Lausanne
- Competitors: 4 in 3 sports
- Flag bearer: Lina Meijer
- Medals: Gold 0 Silver 0 Bronze 0 Total 0

Winter Youth Olympics appearances
- 2012; 2016; 2020; 2024

Luxembourg competed at the 2020 Winter Youth Olympics in Lausanne, Switzerland from 9 to 22 January 2020.

== Alpine skiing ==
Boys

Athlete	Event	Run 1		Run 2		Total	
Athlete	Event	Time	Rank	Time	Rank	Time	Rank
Joachim Keghian	Giant slalom	1:12.10	43	1:10.98	36	2:23.08	37
Joachim Keghian	Slalom	46.40	45	DNF			

== Ice hockey ==
=== Mixed NOC 3x3 tournament ===
Boys

- Nicolas Elgas

Girls

- Lina Meijer

== Short track speed skating ==
One Luxembourgian skater achieved a quota place for Luxembourg based on the results of the 2019 World Junior Short Track Speed Skating Championships.

Girls

Athlete	Event	Heats		Quarterfinal		Semifinal		Final	
Athlete	Event	Time	Rank	Time	Rank	Time	Rank	Time	Rank
Anna Ruysschaert	500 m	46.801	2 Q	47.241	3	did not advance			
Anna Ruysschaert	1000 m	1:48.993	2 Q	1:40.537	4	did not advance			

Mixed team relay

Athlete	Event	Semifinal		Final	
Athlete	Event	Time	Rank	Time	Rank
Team C Florence Brunelle (CAN); Anna Ruysschaert (LUX); Kosei Hayashi (JPN); Daniil Nikolaev (RUS)	Mixed team relay	4:15.601	3 QB	4:16.893	6

== See also ==
- Luxembourg at the 2020 Summer Olympics
