= Malaysia at the 2016 Winter Youth Olympics =

- IOC code: MAS
- NOC: Olympic Council of Malaysia
- Website: www.olympic.org.my (in English)

in Lillehammer
- Competitors: 1 in 1 sport
- Flag bearer: Chew Kai Xiang
- Medals: Gold 0 Silver 0 Bronze 0 Total 0

Winter Youth Olympics appearances (overview)
- 2016; 2020; 2024

Malaysia competed at the 2016 Winter Youth Olympics in Lillehammer, Norway from 12 to 21 February 2016. The country made its debut in the Winter Olympics. The Malaysian team consisted of one figure skater and two officials.

== Figure skating ==
Malaysia had qualified one figure skater.

Boys

Athlete	Event	SP		FS		Total	
Athlete	Event	Points	Rank	Points	Rank	Points	Rank
Chew Kai Xiang	Singles	46.53	11	90.94	13	137.47	11

Mixed NOC team trophy

Athletes	Event	Free skate/Free dance					
Athletes	Event	Ice dance	Pairs	Girls	Boys	Total	
Athletes	Event	Points Team points	Points Team points	Points Team points	Points Team points	Points	Rank
Team Motivation; Guoste Damuleviciute / Deividas Kizala (LTU); Ekaterina Borisova / Dmitry Sopot (RUS); Byun Ji-hyun (KOR); Chew Kai Xiang (MAS)	Team trophy	55.56; 2	104.80; 8	99.94; 6	86.56; 2	18	4

== See also ==
- Malaysia at the 2016 Summer Olympics
