= Kim Seoung-il =

Short track speed skater (born 1990)

Personal information
- Born: 19 December 1990 (age 35) Daegu, South Korea
- Height: 174 cm (5 ft 9 in)
- Weight: 60 kg (132 lb)

Sport
- Country: South Korea
- Sport: Short track speed skating
Medal record
Men's short track speed skating
Representing South Korea
Olympic Games
Silver medal – second place	2010 Vancouver	5000 m relay
World Championships
Gold medal – first place	2010 Sofia	5000 m relay
World Team Championships
Gold medal – first place	2010 Bormio	Team
Winter Universiade
Silver medal – second place	2009 Harbin	1500 m
Silver medal – second place	2009 Harbin	3000 m
Bronze medal – third place	2009 Harbin	5000 m relay
Bronze medal – third place	2011 Erzurum	1000 m
Bronze medal – third place	2011 Erzurum	1500 m

- Kim Seoung-il
- Hangul: 김성일
- Hanja: 金成一
- RR: Gim Seongil
- MR: Kim Sŏngil

Kim Seoung-il (Korean: 김성일; Korean pronunciation: [kim.sʌŋ.il]; born 19 December 1990 in Daegu) is a South Korean short track speed skater.

At the 2009 Winter Universiade, Kim won silver medals behind future Olympic speed skating gold medalist Lee Seung-hoon in the men's 1500 metre and 300 metre events. He added bronze in the 5000 metre relay, combining with Lee Seung-hoon.

Kim earned a silver medal at the 2010 Winter Olympics after skating in the semifinals of the 5000 metre relay.
