= Konstantin Ivliev =

Russian short-track speed skater

Personal information
- Full name: Konstantin Alekseyevich Ivliev
- Nationality: Russian
- Born: 7 August 2000 (age 25) Moscow, Russia

Sport
- Country: Russia
- Sport: Short track speed skating
Medal record
Men's short track speed skating
Representing ROC
Olympic Games
Silver medal – second place	2022 Beijing	500 m
Representing Russia
European Championships
Gold medal – first place	2021 Gdańsk	500 m
Bronze medal – third place	2019 Dordrecht	5000 m relay
Bronze medal – third place	2021 Gdańsk	5000 m relay
World Junior Championships
Silver medal – second place	2018 Tomaszów Mazowiecki	3000 m relay
Silver medal – second place	2020 Bormio	3000 m relay
Bronze medal – third place	2019 Montreal	3000 m relay
Winter Universiade
Silver medal – second place	2019 Krasnoyarsk	5000 m relay
Bronze medal – third place	2019 Krasnoyarsk	500 m

Konstantin Alekseyevich Ivliev (Russian: Константин Алексеевич Ивлиев; born 7 August 2000) is a Russian short track speed skater. He competed at the 2022 Winter Olympics.

== Career ==
Ivliev competed at the 2021 European Championships where he won a gold medal in the 500 metres, and a bronze medal in the 5000 metre relay.

He represented the Russian Olympic Committee athletes at the 2022 Winter Olympics and won a silver medal in the 500 metres event.
