= Short-track speed skating at the 2005 Winter Universiade =

Short track speed skating competition

Short track speed skating at the 2005 Winter Universiade was held from 20 to 22 January 2005.

== Men's events ==
Event	Gold		Silver		Bronze	
500 metres	Song Suk-woo; South Korea	42.510	Seo Ho-jin; South Korea	42.568	Sui Baoku; China	42.636
1000 metres	Sung Si-bak; South Korea	1:27.895	Seo Ho-jin; South Korea	1:27.900	Ahn Hyun-Soo; South Korea	1:28.329
1500 metres	Ahn Hyun-Soo; South Korea	2:26.991	Song Suk-woo; South Korea	2:27.120	Seo Ho-jin; South Korea	2:27.154
3000 metres	Ahn Hyun-Soo; South Korea	4:39.485	Seo Ho-jin; South Korea	4:39.591	Sui Baoku; China	4:40.513
5000 metre relay	South Korea (KOR); Ahn Hyun-Soo; Song Suk-woo; Sung Si-bak; Seo Ho-jin; Yeo Jun-hyung	6:55.561	China (CHN); Liu Xiaoliang; Qi Xin; Sui Baoku; Yang Zhanyu; Ye Liming	6:57.777	Japan (JPN); Takahiro Fujimoto; Hayato Sueyoshi; Shinichi Tagami; Jumpei Yoshizawa	6:58.439

== Women's events ==
Event	Gold		Silver		Bronze	
500 metres	Choi Eun-kyung; South Korea	45.233	Zhu Mi Lei; China	45.242	Stephanie Bouvier; France	45.300
1000 metres	Choi Eun-kyung; South Korea	1:37.810	Yeo Soo-yeon; South Korea	1:37.966	Cho Ha-Ri; South Korea	1:38.115
1500 metres	Choi Eun-kyung; South Korea	2:22.249	Yeo Soo-yeon; South Korea	2:22.329	Wang Wei; China	2:22.349
3000 metres	Choi Eun-kyung; South Korea	5:07.573	Kim Min-Jung; South Korea	5:07.683	Cho Ha-Ri; South Korea	5:07.941
3000 metre relay	South Korea (KOR); Choi Eun-kyung; Jeon Da-Hye; Cho Ha-Ri; Yeo Soo-yeon	4:26.376	Japan (JPN); Miyuki Ozawa; Satomi Sakai; Mariko Uzawa; Hitomi Takeda	4:28.523	China (CHN); Wang Wei; Zhu Mi Lei; Liu Cuijia; Geng Li	4:30.320

== Medals table ==
Rank	Nation	Gold	Silver	Bronze	Total
1	South Korea	10	7	4	21
2	China	0	2	4	6
3	Japan	0	1	1	2
4	France	0	0	1	1
Totals (4 entries)		10	10	10	30
