= Quentin Fercoq =

French speed skater (born 1999)

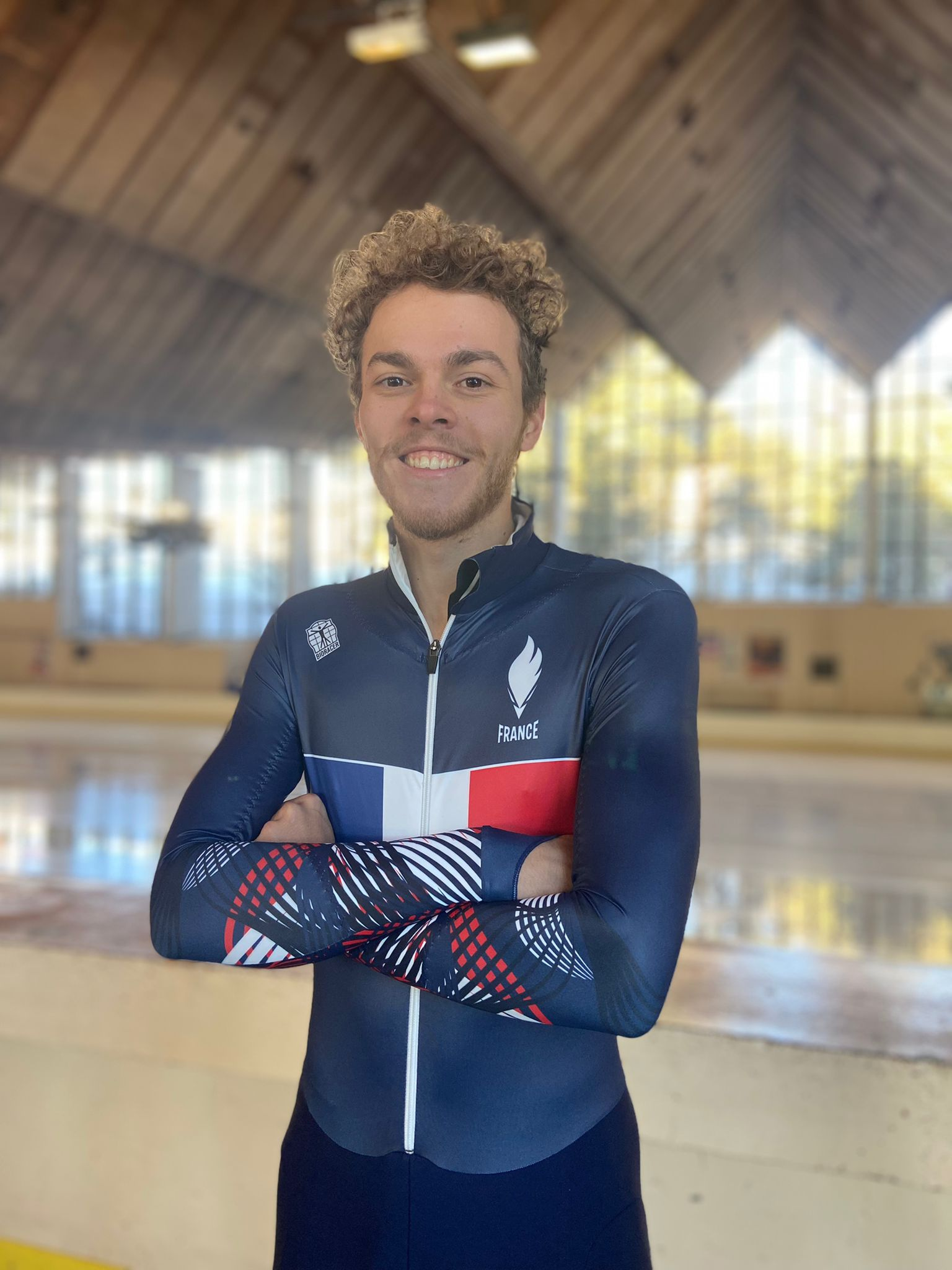
- Fercoq in 2022

Personal information
- Nationality: French
- Born: 5 March 1999 (age 27) Harfleur, France

Sport
- Country: France
- Sport: Short track speed skating
- Club: CVGH
Medal record
Men's short-track speed skating
Representing France
World Championships
Silver medal – second place	2022 Montreal	500 m
European Championships
Gold medal – first place	2025 Dresden	2000 m mixed relay
Bronze medal – third place	2025 Dresden	500 m
Winter World University Games
Gold medal – first place	2023 Lake Placid	2000 m mixed relay
Silver medal – second place	2019 Krasnoyarsk	1500 m
Representing Mixed-NOCs
Winter Youth Olympics
Gold medal – first place	2016 Lillehammer	Mixed team relay

Quentin Fercoq (French pronunciation: [kɑ̃tɛ̃ fɛʁkɔk]; born 5 March 1999) is a French short track speed skater.

He participated at the 2022 Winter Olympics, and won a medal at the 2022 World Short Track Speed Skating Championships.
