= Yeo Soo-yeon =

South Korean short-track speed skater

Personal information
- Born: 19 November 1985 (age 40)

Sport
- Country: South Korea
- Sport: Short track speed skating

Achievements and titles
- Personal bests: 1000 m: 1:30.812 (2005); 1500 m: 2:22.329 (2005); 3000 m: 5:13.541 (2005)
Medal record
Women's short track speed skating
Representing South Korea
World Team Championships
Gold medal – first place	2005 Chuncheon	Team
Universiade
Gold medal – first place	2005 Innsbruck	3000 m relay
Silver medal – second place	2005 Innsbruck	1000 m
Silver medal – second place	2005 Innsbruck	1500 m
World Junior Championships
Gold medal – first place	2003 Budapest	3000 m relay

Yeo Soo-yeon is a former South Korean short-track speed skater. She is a Team World champion as well as a champion and a two-time silver medalist of the Winter Universiade.

During the 2004–05 World Cup season, she won a 3000 m race and finished second in both 1000 m and 1500 m races at the last World Cup stage in Spišská Nová Ves, Slovakia. She also achieved several victories and podiums in relay during that season.

After retiring from competitive sports Yeo worked as a teenagers' coach in Middleburg, Virginia, US. In September 2013, she was also appointed as Sport Manager for the ISU disciplines within the Sports Operation Department for the 2018 Winter Olympics.
