= Short-track speed skating at the 2007 Winter Universiade =

Short track speed skating competition

Short track speed skating at the 2007 Winter Universiade was held from 23 to 26 January 2007.

== Men's events ==
Event	Gold		Silver		Bronze	
500 metres	Sung Si-bak; South Korea	43.136	Zhao Qinyu; China	43.924	Han Jaliang; China	44.535
1000 metres	Sung Si-bak; South Korea	1:28.169	Lee Seung-hoon; South Korea	1:28.177	Lee Hyeon-sung; South Korea	1:28.181
1500 metres	Sung Si-bak; South Korea	2:36.361	Cho Nam-kyu; South Korea	2:36.509	Lee Seung-hoon; South Korea	2:36.590
3000 metres	Sung Si-bak; South Korea	5:54.190	Lee Seung-hoon; South Korea	5:54.240	Lee Hyeon-sung; South Korea	5:54.725
5000 metre relay	South Korea (KOR); Cho Nam-kyu; Lee Seung-hoon; Sung Si-bak; Lee Sung-hoon	6:55.024	China (CHN); Han Jialiang; Ma Yunfeng; Wang Yuxiao; Zhao Qinyu	6:59.931	Italy (ITA); Denis Bellotti; Yuri Confortola; Gianluigi Nover; Nicola Rodigari	7:05.051

== Women's events ==
Event	Gold		Silver		Bronze	
500 metres	Kim Hye-kyung; South Korea	44.557	Liu Cuilja; China	44.889	Anne Maltais; Canada	45.249
1000 metres	Liu Cuilja; China	1:36.620	Cho Ha-ri; South Korea	1:37.466	Marta Capurso; Italy	1:38.270
1500 metres	Kim Hye-kyung; South Korea	2:35.218	Cho Ha-ri; South Korea	2:35.532	Meng Xiaoxue; China	2:35.960
3000 metres	Kang Yun-mi; South Korea	5:04.406	Sun Linlin; China	5:05.097	Hur Hee-been; South Korea	5:05.337
3000 metre relay	China (CHN); Liu Qiuhong; Meng Xiaoxue; Liu Cuijia; Sun Linlin	4:20.345	Japan (JPN); Mika Ozawa; Hiroko Sadakane; Yui Sakai; Hitomi Takeda	4:23.232		

== Medals table ==
Rank	Nation	Gold	Silver	Bronze	Total
1	South Korea	8	5	4	17
2	China	2	4	2	8
3	Japan	0	1	0	1
4	Italy	0	0	2	2
5	Canada	0	0	1	1
Totals (5 entries)		10	10	9	29
