= Short-track speed skating at the 2023 Winter World University Games =

Short track speed skating at the Lake Placid 2023 FISU World University Games
- Short track speed skating pictogram
- Venue: Jack Shea Speed Skating Track
- Dates: 19–21 January 2023

Short track speed skating at the 2023 Winter World University Games was held at the Jack Shea Speed Skating Track from 19 to 21 January 2023.

== Medal summary ==
=== Men ===
Event	Gold		Silver		Bronze	
500 metres	Shogo Miyata; Japan	41.377	Kim Tae-sung; South Korea	41.791	Li Kongchao; China	41.886
1000 metres	Jang Sung-woo; South Korea	1:25.937	Lee Jeong-min; South Korea	1:26.029	Kim Tae-sung; South Korea	1:25.937
1500 metres	Kim Tae-sung; South Korea	2:18.016	Lee Jeong-min; South Korea	2:18.130	Jang Sung-woo; South Korea	2:18.164
5000 metre relay	South Korea; Jang Sung-woo; Jeong Won-sik; Kim Tae-sung; Lee June-seo; Lee Jeong-min	7:10.689	Kazakhstan; Adil Galiakhmetov; Valeriy Klimenko; Yerkebulan Shamukhanov; Sanzhar Zhanissov	7:12.409	Netherlands; Zeno de Boer; Niels Kingma; Daan Kos; Bram Steenaart	7:12.450

=== Women ===
Event	Gold		Silver		Bronze	
500 metres	Choi Min-jeong; South Korea	44.050	Wang Yichao; China	44.568	Park Ji-yun; South Korea	44.723
1000 metres	Choi Min-jeong; South Korea	1:38.107	Anna Seidel; Germany	1:38.134	Seo Whi-min; South Korea	1:38.252
1500 metres	Choi Min-jeong; South Korea	2:40.301	Kim Geon-hee; South Korea	2:40.382	Seo Whi-min; South Korea	2:40.530
3000 metre relay	South Korea; Choi Min-jeong; Kim Geon-hee; Park Ji-yun; Seo Whi-min; Kim Chan-seo	4:12.557	China; Cai Shenyi; Hao Weiying; Jia Huiling; Wang Yichao; Zhang Yan	4:14.642	United States; Julie Letai; Isabella Main; Corinne Stoddard; Una Willhoite	4:24.015

=== Mixed ===
Event	Gold		Silver		Bronze	
2000 metre relay	France; Gwendoline Daudet; Quentin Fercoq; Mathéo Grall; Aurélie Lévêque	2:50.946	Kazakhstan; Alina Azhgaliyeva; Adil Galiakhmetov; Yerkebulan Shamukhanov; Malika Yermek; Yana Khan	2:47.757 (Final B)	Japan; Shuta Matsuzu; Mirei Nakashima; Hana Takahashi; Takumi Wada; Shogo Miyata; Haruna Nagamori	2:48.561 (Final B)

=== Medal table ===
* Host nation (United States)

Rank	Nation	Gold	Silver	Bronze	Total
1	South Korea	7	4	5	16
2	Japan	1	0	1	2
3	France	1	0	0	1
4	China	0	2	1	3
5	Kazakhstan	0	2	0	2
6	Germany	0	1	0	1
7	Netherlands	0	0	1	1
7	United States*	0	0	1	1
Totals (8 entries)		9	9	9	27

== Participating nations ==
A total of 23 nations competed:

- Argentina (1)
- Bulgaria (1)
- Canada (10)
- China (10)
- Chinese Taipei (4)
- Czech Republic (2)
- France (5)
- Germany (4)
- Great Britain (2)
- Hungary (1)
- Italy (2)
- Japan (10)
- Kazakhstan (10)
- Latvia (1)
- Mongolia (3)
- Netherlands (5)
- Norway (1)
- Philippines (1)
- South Korea (7)
- Switzerland (3)
- Turkey (1)
- Ukraine (4)
- United States (10)
