= Short-track speed skating at the 2019 Winter Universiade =

Short track speed skating at the XXIX Winter Universiade
- Dates: 4–6 March 2019

Short track speed skating at the 2019 Winter Universiade was held at the Arena Sever in Krasnoyarsk from 4 to 6 March.

== Men's events ==
Event	Gold		Silver		Bronze	
500 metres	(South Korea) Park Ji-won	40.927	(South Korea) Lim Yong-jin	41.015	(Russia) Konstantin Ivliev	41.149
1000 metres	(South Korea) Hong Kyung-hwan	1:43.727	(South Korea) Lim Yong-jin	1:43.745	(South Korea) Park Ji-won	1:43.837
1500 metres	(China) An Kai	2:34.350	(France) Quentin Fercoq	2:35.460	(Japan) Kiichi Shigehiro	2:36.058
5000 metres relay	South Korea; Hong Kyung-hwan; Lee Seong-hun; Lim Yong-jin; Park Ji-won	6:50.062	Russia; Artem Denisov; Daniil Eibog; Konstantin Ivliev; Sergei Milovanov	6:53.940	Kazakhstan; Nurtilek Kazhgali; Denis Nikisha; Yerkebulan Shamukhanov; Mersaid Zhaxybayev	7:01.344

== Women's events ==
Event	Gold		Silver		Bronze	
500 metres	(France) Aurélie Monvoisin	43.919	(Russia) Ekaterina Efremenkova	44.087	(South Korea) Park Ji-yun	44.813
1000 metres	(South Korea) Kim A-lang	1:32.100	(France) Aurélie Monvoisin	1:32.155	(Russia) Ekaterina Efremenkova	1:32.173
1500 metres	(South Korea) Kim A-lang	2:38.363	(France) Aurélie Monvoisin	2:38.426	(Russia) Ekaterina Efremenkova	2:38.581
3000 metres relay	Russia; Ekaterina Efremenkova; Emina Malagich; Sofia Prosvirnova; Evgeniya Zakharova	4:14.105	Japan; Yuna Koike; Saemi Tanaka; Hikari Tanimoto; Miwako Yamaura; Hinako Matsuyama	4:18.869	Kazakhstan; Aliya Amirgaliyeva; Kadisha Bakhitkereyeva; Yana Khan; Alyona Volkovitskaya	4:27.719

== Medal table ==
* Host nation (Russia)

Rank	Nation	Gold	Silver	Bronze	Total
1	South Korea	5	2	2	9
2	France	1	3	0	4
3	Russia*	1	2	3	6
4	China	1	0	0	1
5	Japan	0	1	1	2
6	Kazakhstan	0	0	2	2
Totals (6 entries)		8	8	8	24
