= Pak Chun-hwa =

North Korean politician

- Hangul: 박춘화
- RR: Bak Chunhwa
- MR: Pak Ch'unhwa

Pak Chun Hwa is the chairperson of the Management Board of the Ripsok Cooperative Farm in Sungho district. On 4 January 2007, in Pyongyang, he gave a speech at a mass rally, with other high government officials, praising Songun Korea.
