= Malaysia at the 2020 Winter Youth Olympics =

- IOC code: MAS
- NOC: Olympic Council of Malaysia
- Website: olympic.org.my

in Lausanne
- Competitors: 2 in 1 sport
- Flag bearer: Dione Tan (closing)
- Medals: Gold 0 Silver 0 Bronze 0 Total 0

Winter Youth Olympics appearances (overview)
- 2016; 2020; 2024

Malaysia competed at the 2020 Winter Youth Olympics in Lausanne, Switzerland from 9 to 22 January 2020.

Malaysia's team consisted of two short track speed skaters (one boy and one girl), marking the country's sport debut at the Winter Youth Olympics.

== Short track speed skating ==
Athlete	Event	Heats		Quarterfinal		Semifinal		Final	
Athlete	Event	Time	Rank	Time	Rank	Time	Rank	Time	Rank
Sean Yeo	Boys' 500 m	44.026	3	did not advance					
Sean Yeo	Boys' 1000 m	1:31.117	3	did not advance					
Dione Tan	Girls' 500 m	48.317	3	did not advance					
Dione Tan	Girls' 1000 m	1:47.536	3	did not advance					

== See also ==
- Malaysia at the 2020 Summer Olympics
