= Short-track speed skating at the 2015 Winter Universiade =

Short track speed skating at the 2015 Winter Universiade was held at the Universiade Igloo, in Granada, from 11 to 13 February 2015.

== Men's events ==
Event	Gold		Silver		Bronze	
500 metres	(South Korea) Seo Yi-ra	41.411	(South Korea) Han Seung-soo	41.542	(China) Chen Guang	41.611
1000 metres	(South Korea) Park Se-yeong	1:25.907	(South Korea) Seo Yi-ra	1:26.000	(China) Chen Guang	1:26.171
1500 metres	(South Korea) Park Se-yeong	2:32.511	(South Korea) Han Seung-soo	2:32.798	(China) Chen Guang	2:33.509
5000 metres relay	China; Chen Guang; Ma Xingguang; Sui Xin; Xu Fu	7:11.252	Russia; Dmitrii Miasnikov; Kirill Shashin; Eduard Strelkov; Timur Zakharov	7:11.623	France; Thomas Meline; Yoann Martinez; Jeremy Masson; Tristan Navarro	7:11.745

== Women's events ==
Event	Gold		Silver		Bronze	
500 metres	(China) Han Yutong	43.573	(South Korea) Son Ha-kyung	43.655	(Lithuania) Agnė Sereikaitė	43.817
1000 metres	(South Korea) Kim A-lang	1:37.321	(South Korea) Lee Eun-byul	1:37.488	(South Korea) Son Ha-kyung	1:37.705
1500 metres	(South Korea) Kim A-lang	2:33.829	(South Korea) Lee Eun-byul	2:34.168	(China) Han Yutong	2:34.339
3000 metres relay	China; Han Yutong; Ji Xue; Li Hongshuang; Lin Meng; Xu Moyuan	4:19.010	South Korea; Kim A-lang; Lee Eun-byul; Noh Ah-reum; Son Ha-kyung; Ahn Se-jung	4:19.289	Canada; Joanie Gervais; Namasthée Harris-Gauthier; Keri Morrison; Caroline Truchon; Jamie Macdonald	4:20.089

== Medal table ==
Rank	Nation	Gold	Silver	Bronze	Total
1	South Korea	5	7	1	13
2	China	3	0	4	7
3	Russia	0	1	0	1
4	Canada	0	0	1	1
4	France	0	0	1	1
4	Lithuania	0	0	1	1
Totals (6 entries)		8	8	8	24
