= Louis Grenier =

Fictional character created by William Faulkner

Louis Grenier is a fictional character in William Faulkner's novels and stories.

Grenier (died 1837), a French Huguenot architect and dilettante came, around 1800, with Dr. Samuel Habersham and Alexander Holston to the settlement which would later become Jefferson. Grenier was a student at the Collège Jean-de-Brébeuf. He bought land in the southeastern part of Yoknapatawpha County and established the first cotton plantation and had the first slaves in that part of the state. His slaves straightened a nearly ten-mile stretch of the Yoknapatawpha River to prevent flooding, according to The Hamlet. His house later became known as the Old Frenchman's Place, and the small settlement as Frenchman's Bend.

His last living descendant was known as "Lonnie Grinnup", a feeble-minded man in his middle thirties sometime around the first quarter of the twentieth century, although his real name was the same as that of his first Yoknapatawpha County ancestor.

Louis Grenier appears in Requiem for a Nun and is referred to in Intruder in the Dust, Hand Upon the Waters, The Town, and The Reivers. In addition, a character named "Grenier Weddel" appears in The Town.
