= Seo Whi-min =

South Korean speed skater (born 2002)

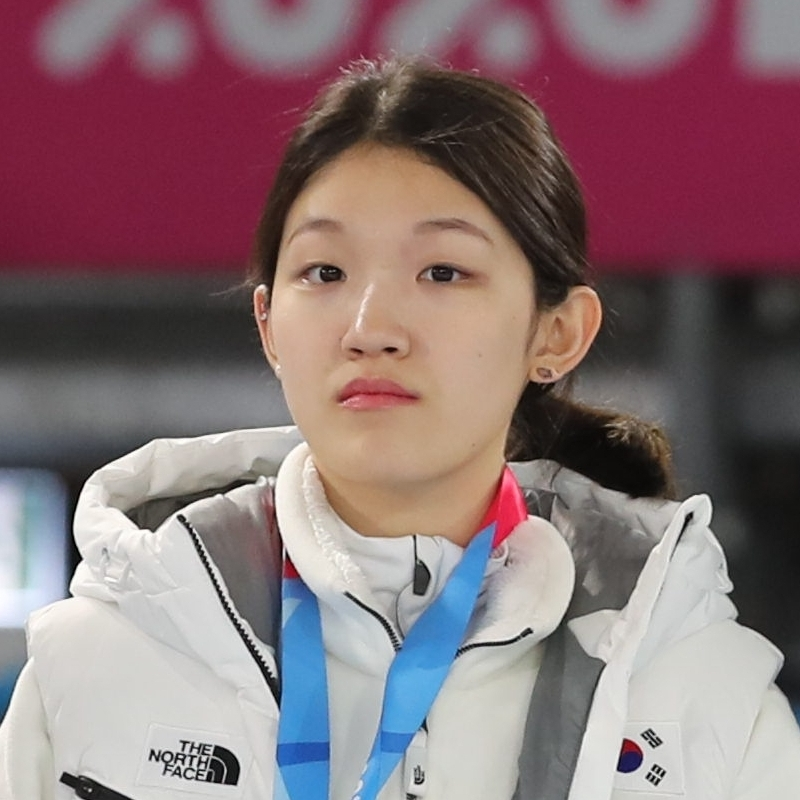
- Seo at the 2020 Winter Youth Olympics

Personal information
- Nationality: South Korean
- Born: 13 March 2002 (age 24) Seoul, South Korea
- Height: 165 cm (5 ft 5 in)

Sport
- Country: South Korea
- Sport: Short track speed skating
- Club: Korea University; Seongnam City Hall (since 2025)
Medal record
Women's short-track speed skating
Representing South Korea
Olympic Games
Silver medal – second place	2022 Beijing	3000 m relay
World Championships
Gold medal – first place	2022 Montréal	3000 m relay
Bronze medal – third place	2022 Montréal	1500 m
Winter World University Games
Gold medal – first place	2023 Lake Placid	3000 m relay
Gold medal – first place	2025 Turin	3000 m relay
Gold medal – first place	2025 Turin	2000 m mixed relay
Silver medal – second place	2025 Turin	1000 m
Silver medal – second place	2025 Turin	1500 m
Bronze medal – third place	2023 Lake Placid	1000 m
Bronze medal – third place	2023 Lake Placid	1500 m
Bronze medal – third place	2025 Turin	500 m
Winter Youth Olympics
Gold medal – first place	2020 Lausanne	500 m
Gold medal – first place	2020 Lausanne	1000 m
World Junior Championships
Gold medal – first place	2017 Innsbruck	1500 m
Gold medal – first place	2019 Montreal	1500 m
Gold medal – first place	2019 Montreal	3000 m relay
Silver medal – second place	2017 Innsbruck	Overall
Silver medal – second place	2017 Innsbruck	1000 m
Representing Mixed-NOCs
Winter Youth Olympics
Bronze medal – third place	2020 Lausanne	Mixed team relay

Seo Whi-min (Korean: 서휘민, born 13 March 2002) is a South Korean short track speed skater who competed at the 2022 Winter Olympics.

== Career ==
Seo made her World Cup debut at the 2019–20 ISU Short Track Speed Skating World Cup and finished with seven podium finishes.

She represented South Korea at the 2020 Winter Youth Olympics and won a gold medal in the 500 metres and 1000 metres events. She also won a bronze medal in the mixed team relay.

She represented South Korea at the 2022 Winter Olympics in the 3000 metre relay and won a silver medal.
