= Jang Sung-woo (speed skater) =

South Korean short-track speed skater (born 2002)

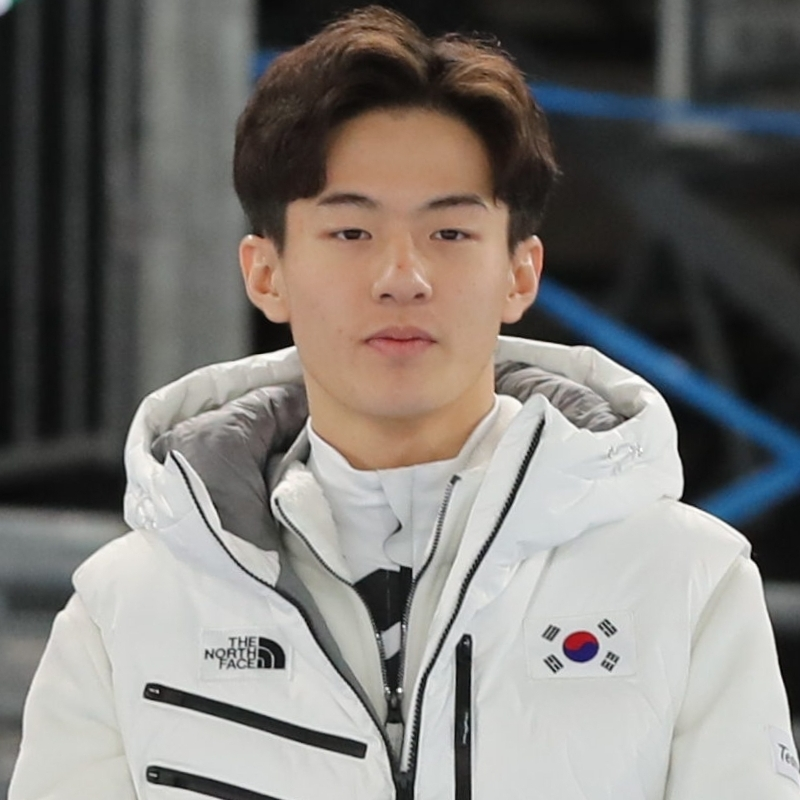
- Jang at the 2020 Winter Youth Olympics

Personal information
- Born: 19 March 2002 (age 24) Daegu, South Korea

Sport
- Country: South Korea
- Sport: Short-track speed skating
Medal record
Men's short-track speed skating
Representing South Korea
World Championships
Bronze medal – third place	2025 Beijing	5000 m relay
Asian Winter Games
Gold medal – first place	2025 Harbin	1000 m
Gold medal – first place	2025 Harbin	2000 m mixed relay
Bronze medal – third place	2025 Harbin	500 m
Bronze medal – third place	2025 Harbin	1500 m
Winter World University Games
Gold medal – first place	2023 Lake Placid	1000 m
Gold medal – first place	2023 Lake Placid	5000 m relay
Bronze medal – third place	2023 Lake Placid	1500 m
Four Continents Championships
Gold medal – first place	2024 Laval	5000 m relay
Winter Youth Olympics
Gold medal – first place	2020 Lausanne	1000 m
Silver medal – second place	2020 Lausanne	500 m
World Junior Championships
Gold medal – first place	2020 Bormio	3000 m relay
Representing Mixed-NOCs
Winter Youth Olympics
Silver medal – second place	2020 Lausanne	Mixed team relay

Jang Sung-woo (Korean: 장성우, born 19 March 2002) is a South Korean short-track speed skater.

== Career ==
Jang represented South Korea at the 2020 Winter Youth Olympics and won a gold medal in the 1000 metres and a silver medal in the 500 metres events. He also won a silver medal in the mixed team relay.

He represented South Korea at the 2025 Asian Winter Games and won gold medals in the 1000 metres with a time of 1:28.304, and the 2000 metre mixed relay. He also won bronze medals in the 500 metres and 1500 metres.

Jang fell during the selection trials for the 2026 Winter Olympics and suffered an ankle injury. As a result he failed to qualify for the Olympics.
