= Kim Chun-hwa =

North Korean speed skater

Personal information
- Born: 14 July 1974 (age 50); Haeju, Hamgyeongnam, South Hamgyong Province, North Korea

Sport
- Country: North Korea
- Sport: Short track speed skating

Kim Chun-hwa (born 14 July 1974) is a former North Korean female short track speed skater. She was one of twenty North Korean athletes at the 1992 Winter Olympics in Albertville, France, where she competed in the 500m short track speed skating event. She finished in 19th place, behind another of her teammates, bronze medalist Hwang Ok-sil.

She also competed in the 1991 Winter Universiade in Sapporo, Japan. There, she earned a gold medal in the 1500m short track, and a bronze medal in the 3000m, giving North Korea two of its seven medals. In the 1993 Winter Universiade in Zakopane, Poland she won a silver medal in the 500m, one of the best results by a North Korean at that event.

Kim is a graduate of the Sosong district extramural sports school in Pyongyang.
