= Lee Jeong-min (speed skater) =

South Korean speed skater (born 2002)

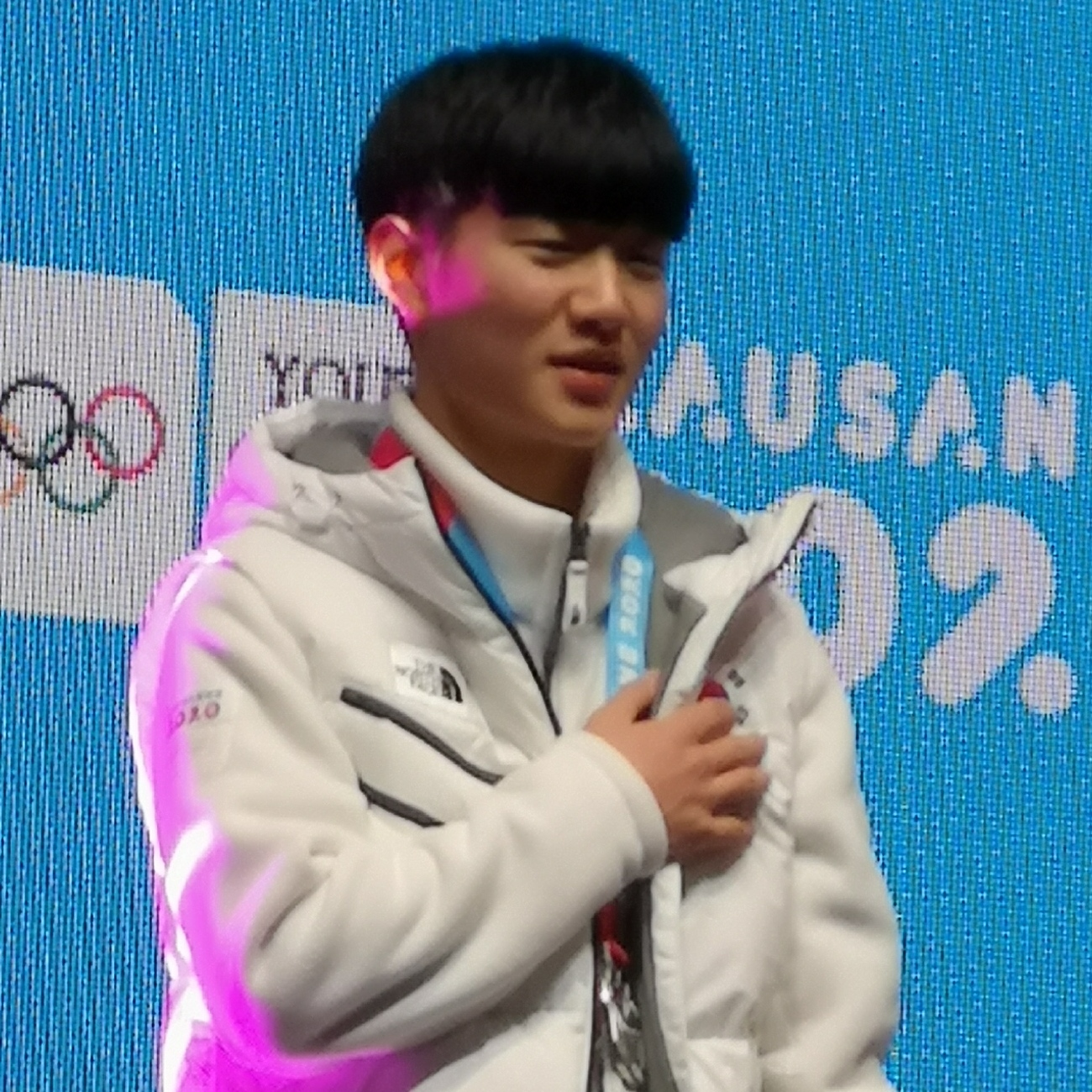
- Lee at the 2020 Winter Youth Olympics

Personal information
- Born: 25 January 2002 (age 24) Seoul, South Korea

Sport
- Country: South Korea
- Sport: Short-track speed skating
- Club: Seongnam City Hall
Medal record
Men's short-track speed skating
Representing South Korea
Olympic Games
Silver medal – second place	2026 Milano Cortina	5000 m relay
World Championships
Silver medal – second place	2024 Rotterdam	5000 m relay
Winter World University Games
Gold medal – first place	2023 Lake Placid	5000 m relay
Silver medal – second place	2023 Lake Placid	1000 m
Silver medal – second place	2023 Lake Placid	1500 m
Winter Youth Olympics
Gold medal – first place	2020 Lausanne	500 m
Silver medal – second place	2020 Lausanne	1000 m
World Junior Championships
Gold medal – first place	2020 Bormio	500 m
Gold medal – first place	2020 Bormio	3000 m relay

Lee Jeong-min (Korean: 이정민; born 25 January 2002) is a South Korean short-track speed skater. He represented South Korea at the 2026 Winter Olympics, winning a silver medal in the 5000 m relay.

== Career ==
Lee represented South Korea at the 2020 Winter Youth Olympics and won a gold medal in the 500 metres and a silver medal in the 1000 metres events.

In January 2026, he was selected to represent South Korea at the 2026 Winter Olympics.
