= Shogo Miyata =

Japanese speed skater (born 2003)

Shōgo Miyata
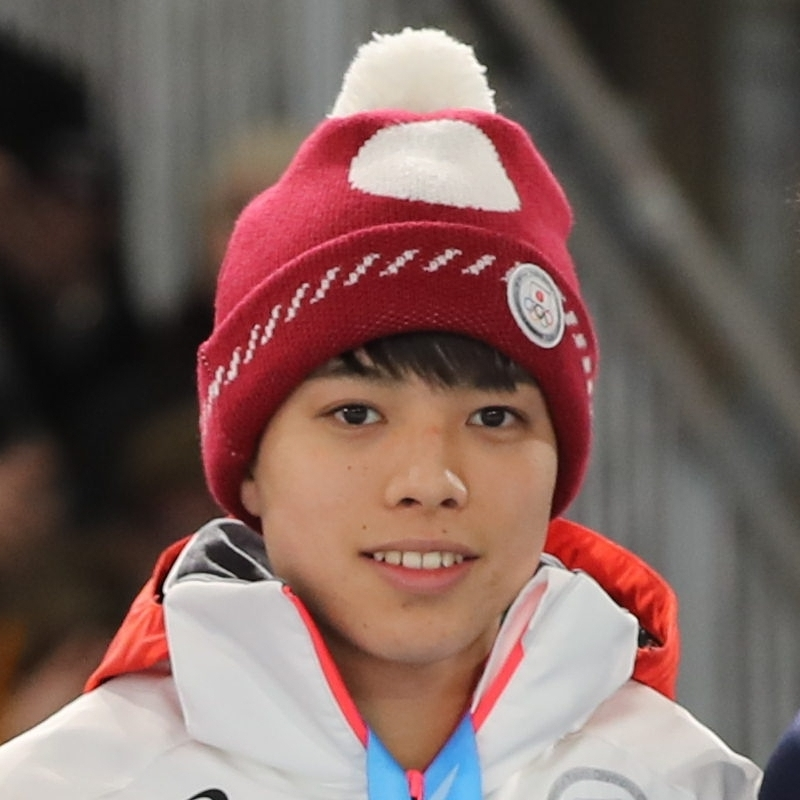
- Miyata at the 2020 Winter Youth Olympics

Personal information
- Nationality: Japanese
- Born: 27 January 2003 (age 23) Osaka

Sport
- Country: Japan
- Sport: Short track speed skating
Medal record
Representing Japan
World Junior Championships
Bronze medal – third place	2020 Bormio	5000 m relay
FISU World University Games
Gold medal – first place	2023 Lake Placid	500 m
Bronze medal – third place	2023 Lake Placid	Mixed Relay
Silver medal – second place	2025 Turin	500 m
Silver medal – second place	2025 Turin	Mixed Relay
Representing Mixed-NOCs
Youth Olympic Games
Gold medal – first place	2020 Lausanne	Mixed team relay

Shōgo Miyata (宮田 将吾 (Miyata Shōgo) born 27 January 2003) is a Japanese short-track speed skater. He has represented his country at the 2022 Winter Olympics. At the 2020 Winter Youth Olympics he won a gold medal in the relay for mixed teams.

== Career ==
Miyata made his international debut at the 2019 Junior World Championships in Montreal where his best result was a fourth place at the 1500 meter race. The next season he won the gold medal in the mixed relay at the 2020 Winter Youth Olympics and a bronze medal at the 2020 Junior World Championships. In 2022 Miyata represented Japan at the 2022 Winter Olympics. He won two silver medals at the 2025 Winter World University Games.
