= 2019 World Junior Short Track Speed Skating Championships =

International speed skating competition

- Venue: Maurice Richard Arena, Montreal, Canada
- Dates: January 25–27, 2019
- Competitors: 171 from 36 nations

The 2019 World Junior Short Track Speed Skating Championships took place between January 25 and 27, 2019 in Maurice Richard Arena, Montreal, Canada.

== Medal summary ==
=== Medal table ===
* Host nation (Canada)

| Rank | Nation | Gold | Silver | Bronze | Total |
|---|---|---|---|---|---|
| 1 | South Korea (KOR) | 5 | 2 | 0 | 7 |
| 2 | China (CHN) | 2 | 3 | 0 | 5 |
| 3 | United States (USA) | 1 | 0 | 0 | 1 |
| 4 | Netherlands (NED) | 0 | 2 | 1 | 3 |
| 5 | Russia (RUS) | 0 | 1 | 1 | 2 |
| 6 | Italy (ITA) | 0 | 0 | 3 | 3 |
| 7 | Canada (CAN)* | 0 | 0 | 2 | 2 |
| 8 | Japan (JPN) | 0 | 0 | 1 | 1 |
| Totals (8 entries) | | 8 | 8 | 8 | 24 |

== Men's events ==
| Event | Gold | | Silver | | Bronze | |
|---|---|---|---|---|---|---|
| 500 metres | Kim Tae-sung; South Korea | 40.943 | Sun Long; China | 41.252 | Pietro Sighel; Italy | 41.263 |
| 1000 metres | Jung Ho-kyoung; South Korea | 1:28.042 | Kim Tae-sung; South Korea | 1:28.307 | Kazuki Yoshinaga; Japan | 1:28.446 |
| 1500 metres | Chang Hyun-woo; South Korea | 2:26.047 | Wang Pengyu; China | 2:26.443 | Pietro Sighel; Italy | 2:26.457 |
| 3000 metre relay | China; Li Wenlong; Song Jian; Sun Long; Wang Pengyu | 3:58.501 | Netherlands; Sven Roes; Bram Steenaart; Jens van 't Wout; Melle van 't Wout | 3:58.570 | Russia; Konstantin Ivliev; Daniil Krasnokutskiy; Sergei Milovanov; Aleksey Simakin | 3:58.602 |

== Women's events ==
| Event | Gold | | Silver | | Bronze | |
|---|---|---|---|---|---|---|
| 500 metres | Maame Biney; United States | 43.800 | Xandra Velzeboer; Netherlands | 45.350 | Georgia Dalrymple; Netherlands | 1:04.495 |
| 1000 metres | Li Jinyu; China | 1:31.258 | Park Yoon-jung; South Korea | 1:31.784 | Claudia Heeney; Canada | 1:32.422 |
| 1500 metres | Seo Whi-min; South Korea | 2:25.251 | Li Jinyu; China | 2:25.320 | Courtney Lee Sarault; Canada | 2:25.770 |
| 3000 metre relay | South Korea; Jeon Yu-min; Kim Chae-hyun; Park Yoon-jung; Seo Whi-min | 4:14.699 | Russia; Sofya Boytsova; Liudmila Kozulina; Anna Matveeva; Vera Rasskazova | 4:15.361 | Italy; Chiara Betti; Elisa Confortola; Gloria Confortola; Gloria Ioriatti | 4:15.553 |

== Participating nations ==
- Argentina (1)
- Australia (8)
- Austria (3)
- Belgium (2)
- Bulgaria (2)
- Canada (8)
- China (8)
- Chinese Taipei (5)
- Croatia (2)
- Czech Republic (2)
- France (3)
- Germany (4)
- Great Britain (8)
- Hong Kong (2)
- Hungary (8)
- Italy (8)
- Japan (8)
- Kazakhstan (8)
- Latvia (3)
- Luxembourg (4)
- Malaysia (6)
- Netherlands (8)
- New Zealand (1)
- Philippines (2)
- Poland (8)
- Russia (8)
- Singapore (5)
- Serbia (4)
- Slovakia (2)
- Slovenia (2)
- South Korea (8)
- Sweden (1)
- Switzerland (1)
- Thailand (2)
- Ukraine (8)
- United States (8)

== See also ==
- Short track speed skating
- World Junior Short Track Speed Skating Championships
