= Félix Pigeon =

Canadian-Polish speed skater (born 2002)

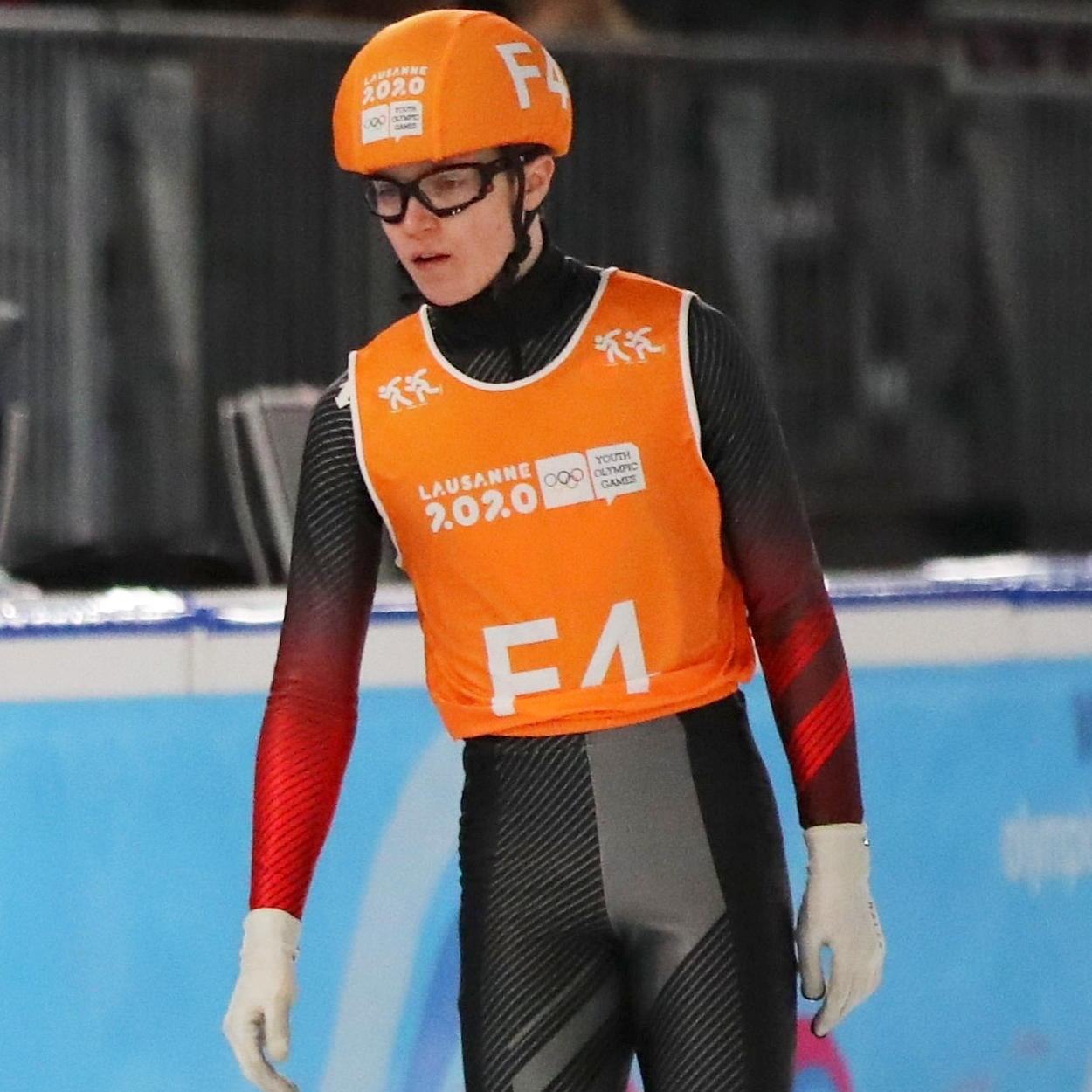
- Pigeon at the 2020 Winter Youth Olympics

Personal information
- Born: 18 June 2002 (age 24) Granby, Quebec, Canada

Sport
- Country: Poland
- Sport: Short-track speed skating
Medal record
Men's short-track speed skating
Representing Poland
World Championships
Bronze medal – third place	2024 Rotterdam	5000 m relay
European Championships
Silver medal – second place	2026 Tilburg	2000 m mixed relay
Bronze medal – third place	2024 Gdańsk	5000 m relay
Bronze medal – third place	2026 Tilburg	5000 m relay

Félix Pigeon (born 18 June 2002) is a Canadian and Polish short-track speed skater who represented Poland at the 2026 Winter Olympics.

== Early life ==
Pigeon was born in Granby, Quebec, Canada and moved to Poland in 2022.

== Career ==
In January 2024, Pigeon competed at the 2024 European Short Track Speed Skating Championships and won a bronze medal in the 5000 metre relay. In March 2024, he competed at the 2024 World Short Track Speed Skating Championships and won a bronze medal in the 5000 metre relay.

During the 2025–26 ISU Short Track World Tour, he earned his first career World Tour podium on 29 November 2025, finishing in third place in the 500 metres.

In January 2026, he competed at the 2026 European Short Track Speed Skating Championships and won a silver medal in the 2000 metre mixed relay and a bronze medal in the 5000 metre relay. He was subsequently selected to represent Poland at the 2026 Winter Olympics.
