= Short-track speed skating at the 2026 Winter Olympics – Men's 1500 metres =

Men's 1500 metres at the XXV Olympic Winter Games
- Short-track speed skating
- Venue: Forum di Milano, Milan
- Date: 14 February
- Competitors: 36 from 19 nations
- Winning time: 2:12.219

Medalists
1st place, gold medalist(s)		Jens van 't Wout	Netherlands
2nd place, silver medalist(s)		Hwang Dae-heon	South Korea
3rd place, bronze medalist(s)		Roberts Krūzbergs	Latvia

The Men's 1500 metres competition in short-track speed skating at the 2026 Winter Olympics was held on 14 February 2026 at the Forum di Milano in Milan. Jens van 't Wout of the Netherlands won the event. Hwang Dae-heon of South Korea won silver and Roberts Krūzbergs of Latvia bronze. Krūzbergs's medal became the first Olympic medal for Latvia in short-track speed skating. Final A, unusually, featured nine athletes since some of them, including Krūzbergs, were advanced there as a result of collisions.

== Background ==
The defending champion, Hwang Dae-heon, qualified for the Olympics, as did the silver medalist. Steven Dubois. The bronze medalist, Semion Elistratov, did not compete internationally after the start of the Russian invasion of Ukraine. Before the Olympics, William Dandjinou led the 2025–26 ISU Short Track World Tour 1500 m standings as well as the overall standings. He was also the 1500 m 2025 World champion.

== Qualification ==
Countries were assigned quotas based on their performance during the 2025–26 ISU Short Track World Tour. A total of 35 athletes from 18 nations qualified for the event.

== Records ==
Prior to this competition, the world and Olympic records were as follows.

World record	Sjinkie Knegt (NLD)	2:07.943	Salt Lake City, United States	13 November 2016
Olympic record	Shaolin Sándor Liu (HUN)	2:09.213	Beijing, China	9 February 2022

== Results ==
=== Quarterfinals ===
14 February 2026, 20:15

Rank	Heat	Name	Country	Time	Notes
1	1	Luca Spechenhauser	Italy	2:12.485	Q
2	1	William Dandjinou	Canada	2:12.610	Q
3	1	Brendan Corey	Australia	2:12.741	Q
4	1	Keita Watanabe	Japan	2:12.851	q
5	1	Itzhak de Laat	Netherlands	2:12.974	
6	1	Michał Niewiński	Poland	2:15.853	
1	2	Roberts Krūzbergs	Latvia	2:18.237	Q
2	2	Thomas Nadalini	Italy	2:18.543	Q
3	2	Félix Pigeon	Poland	2:18.687	Q
4	2	Stijn Desmet	Belgium	2:18.802	
5	2	Ivan Posashkov	Individual Neutral Athletes	2:19.117	
6	2	Clayton DeClemente	United States	2:32.539	
1	3	Hwang Dae-heon	South Korea	2:23.283	Q
2	3	Shaoang Liu	China	2:23.370	Q
3	3	Shogo Miyata	Japan	2:23.454	Q
4	3	Étienne Bastier	France	2:23.760	
5	3	Moon Won-jun	Hungary	2:23.997	
6	3	Kwok Tsz Fung	Hong Kong	2:25.707	
1	4	Jens van 't Wout	Netherlands	2:20.657	Q
2	4	Andrew Heo	United States	2:20.826	Q
3	4	Sun Long	China	2:20.897	Q
4	4	Kazuki Yoshinaga	Japan	2:21.044	
5	4	Bence Nógrádi	Hungary	2:22.207	
6	4	Lin Xiaojun	China	No time	
1	5	Félix Roussel	Canada	2:17.276	Q
2	5	Niall Treacy	Great Britain	2:17.365	Q
3	5	Shin Dong-min	South Korea	2:17.365	Q
4	5	Nicolas Andermann	Austria	2:17.869	q
5	5	Quentin Fercoq	France	2:18.492	
6	5	Rim Jong-un	South Korea	2:38.452	
1	6	Steven Dubois	Canada	2:15.888	Q
2	6	Brandon Kim	United States	2:16.154	Q
3	6	Daniil Eybog	Uzbekistan	2:16.963	Q
4	6	Oleh Handei	Ukraine	2:58.831	ADV
5	6	Pietro Sighel	Italy	3:09.757	
	6	Friso Emons	Netherlands		PEN

=== Semifinals ===
14 February 2026, 21:49

Rank	Heat	Name	Country	Time	Notes
1	1	William Dandjinou	Canada	2:15.619	QA
2	1	Hwang Dae-heon	South Korea	2:15.823	QA
3	1	Luca Spechenhauser	Italy	2:15.895	QB
4	1	Andrew Heo	United States	2:16.150	QB
5	1	Keita Watanabe	Japan	2:16.368	QB
6	1	Shaoang Liu	China	2:31.859	ADVA
	1	Shogo Miyata	Japan		PEN
1	2	Jens van 't Wout	Netherlands	2:14.988	QA
2	2	Sun Long	China	2:15.160	QA
3	2	Brandon Kim	United States	2:15.817	QB
4	2	Nicolas Andermann	Austria	2:16.519	QB
5	2	Brendan Corey	Australia	2:16.575	
6	2	Steven Dubois	Canada	2:19.273	ADVA
	2	Thomas Nadalini	Italy		PEN
1	3	Niall Treacy	Great Britain	2:16.816	QA
2	3	Shin Dong-min	South Korea	2:17.192	QA
3	3	Daniil Eybog	Uzbekistan	2:18.000	QB
4	3	Oleh Handei	Ukraine	2:18.408	QB
5	3	Félix Pigeon	Poland	2:40.503	
6	3	Roberts Krūzbergs	Latvia	2:53.239	ADVA
	3	Félix Roussel	Canada		YC

=== Finals ===
==== Final B ====
14 February 2026, 22:37

Rank	Name	Country	Time	Notes
10	Luca Spechenhauser	Italy	2:34.359	
11	Andrew Heo	United States	2:34.460	
12	Keita Watanabe	Japan	2:34.631	
13	Nicolas Andermann	Austria	2:34.939	
14	Daniil Eybog	Uzbekistan	2:35.103	
15	Brandon Kim	United States	2:35.254	
16	Oleh Handei	Ukraine	2:37.184	

==== Final A ====
14 February 2026, 22:45

Rank	Name	Country	Time	Notes
1st place, gold medalist(s)	Jens van 't Wout	Netherlands	2:12.219	
2nd place, silver medalist(s)	Hwang Dae-heon	South Korea	2:12.304	
3rd place, bronze medalist(s)	Roberts Krūzbergs	Latvia	2:12.376	
4	Shin Dong-min	South Korea	2:12.556	
5	William Dandjinou	Canada	2:12.639	
6	Steven Dubois	Canada	2:36.955	
7	Shaoang Liu	China	3:15.414	
8	Sun Long	China	DNF	
9	Niall Treacy	Great Britain		PEN
