= Short-track speed skating at the 2026 Winter Olympics – Men's 1000 metres =

Men's 1000 metres at the XXV Olympic Winter Games
- Short-track speed skating
- Venue: Forum di Milano, Milan
- Date: 10 and 12 February
- Competitors: 32 from 17 nations
- Winning time: 1:24.537

Medalists
1st place, gold medalist(s)		Jens van 't Wout	Netherlands
2nd place, silver medalist(s)		Sun Long	China
3rd place, bronze medalist(s)		Rim Jong-un	South Korea

The men's 1000 metres competition in short-track speed skating at the 2026 Winter Olympics was held on 10 February (heats) and 12 February (finals), 2026 at the Forum di Milano in Milan. Jens van 't Wout of the Netherlands won the event. Sun Long of China won the silver medal and Rim Jong-un of South Korea bronze. For all of them, these were the first Olympic medals.

== Background ==
The defending champion, Ren Ziwei, was not available to defend the title. The 2022 silver medalist, Li Wenlong, was selected for the Olympics but did not race 1000 m. The bronze medalist Shaoang Liu qualified, though he switched from representing Hungary to China. Before the Olympics, Pietro Sighel was leading the 2025–26 ISU Short Track World Tour 1000 m standings, and William Dandjinou led the overall standings. Steven Dubois was the 1000 m 2025 World champion.

== Qualification ==
Countries were assigned quotas based on their performance during the 2025–26 ISU Short Track World Tour. A total of 32 athletes from 17 nations qualified for the event.

== Records ==
Prior to this competition, the world and Olympic records were as follows.

World record	Hwang Dae-heon (KOR)	1:20.875	Salt Lake City, United States	12 November 2016
Olympic record	Hwang Dae-heon (KOR)	1:23.042	Beijing, China	5 February 2022

== Results ==
=== Heats ===
10 February 2026, 11:10

Rank	Heat	Name	Country	Time	Notes
1	1	Pietro Sighel	Italy	1:25.740	Q
2	1	Quentin Fercoq	France	1:25.818	Q
3	1	Denis Nikisha	Kazakhstan	1:25.987	
4	1	Brendan Corey	Australia	1:26.052	
1	2	Luca Spechenhauser	Italy	1:25.422	Q
2	2	Rim Jong-un	South Korea	1:25.558	Q
3	2	Stijn Desmet	Belgium	1:25.581	
4	2	Kwok Tsz Fung	Hong Kong	1:27.237	
1	3	Shaoang Liu	China	1:26.814	Q
2	3	Thomas Nadalini	Italy	1:26.882	Q
3	3	Shogo Miyata	Japan	1:26.997	
4	3	Bence Nógrádi	Hungary	1:27.132	
1	4	Kazuki Yoshinaga	Japan	1:25.944	Q
2	4	Clayton DeClemente	United States	1:26.189	Q
3	4	Steven Dubois	Canada	1:50.137	
4	4	Niall Treacy	Great Britain	1:54.040	
1	5	William Dandjinou	Canada	1:24.672	Q
2	5	Shin Dong-min	South Korea	1:24.870	Q
3	5	Moon Won-jun	Hungary	1:25.048	q
4	5	Étienne Bastier	France	1:25.908	
1	6	Félix Roussel	Canada	1:23.828	Q
2	6	Hwang Dae-heon	South Korea	1:24.133	Q
3	6	Teun Boer	Netherlands	1:24.395	q
4	6	Félix Pigeon	Poland	1:26.271	
1	7	Jens van 't Wout	Netherlands	1:25.237	Q
2	7	Reinis Bērziņš	Latvia	1:25.741	Q
3	7	Lin Xiaojun	China	1:26.314	ADV
	7	Ivan Posashkov	Individual Neutral Athletes		PEN
1	8	Michał Niewiński	Poland	1:25.135	Q
2	8	Sun Long	China	1:25.339	Q
3	8	Roberts Krūzbergs	Latvia	1:25.341	ADV
	8	Brandon Kim	United States		PEN

=== Quarterfinals ===
12 February 2026, 20:34

Rank	Heat	Name	Country	Time	Notes
1	1	Félix Roussel	Canada	1:24.227	Q
2	1	Shaoang Liu	China	1:24.292	Q
3	1	Teun Boer	Netherlands	1:26.638	ADV
4	1	Thomas Nadalini	Italy	1:34.487	
	1	Hwang Dae-heon	South Korea		PEN
1	2	William Dandjinou	Canada	1:23.781	Q
2	2	Shin Dong-min	South Korea	1:23.971	Q
3	2	Moon Won-jun	Hungary	1:23.988	
4	2	Kazuki Yoshinaga	Japan	1:24.079	
5	2	Clayton DeClemente	United States	1:24.244	
1	3	Sun Long	China	1:26.563	Q
2	3	Roberts Krūzbergs	Latvia	1:27.133	Q
3	3	Michał Niewiński	Poland	1:46.369	ADV
	3	Pietro Sighel	Italy		PEN
	3	Quentin Fercoq	France		PEN
1	4	Jens van 't Wout	Netherlands	1:25.199	Q
2	4	Rim Jong-un	South Korea	1:25.213	Q
3	4	Luca Spechenhauser	Italy	1:25.260	
4	4	Reinis Bērziņš	Latvia	1:25.379	
5	4	Lin Xiaojun	China	1:25.782	

=== Semifinals ===
12 February 2026, 21:12

Rank	Heat	Name	Country	Time	Notes
1	1	William Dandjinou	Canada	1:23.520	QA
2	1	Sun Long	China	1:23.585	QA
3	1	Roberts Krūzbergs	Latvia	1:23.700	qA
4	1	Teun Boer	Netherlands	1:24.209	QB
5	1	Shin Dong-min	South Korea	1:24.327	QB
1	2	Rim Jong-un	South Korea	1:24.025	QA
2	2	Jens van 't Wout	Netherlands	1:24.664	QA
3	2	Michał Niewiński	Poland	1:25.617	QB
4	2	Shaoang Liu	China	1:26.102	QB
5	2	Félix Roussel	Canada	1:57.163	QB

=== Finals ===
==== Final B ====
12 February 2026, 21:52

Rank	Name	Country	Time	Notes
6	Shaoang Liu	China	1:27.211	
7	Teun Boer	Netherlands	1:27.267	
8	Shin Dong-min	South Korea	1:27.453	
9	Michał Niewiński	Poland	1:27.521	
10	Félix Roussel	Canada	1:28.007	

==== Final A ====
12 February 2026, 21:58

Rank	Name	Country	Time	Notes
1st place, gold medalist(s)	Jens van 't Wout	Netherlands	1:24.537	
2nd place, silver medalist(s)	Sun Long	China	1:24.565	
3rd place, bronze medalist(s)	Rim Jong-un	South Korea	1:24.611	
4	William Dandjinou	Canada	1:24.671	
5	Roberts Krūzbergs	Latvia	1:24.681	
