= Short-track speed skating at the 2024 Winter Youth Olympics – Women's 500 metres =

Women's 500 metres at the IV Winter Youth Olympic Games
- Venue: Gangneung Ice Arena
- Dates: 22 January
- Competitors: 35 from 22 nations
- Winning time: 44.314

Medalists
1st place, gold medalist(s)		Anna Falkowska	Poland
2nd place, silver medalist(s)		Kang Min-ji	South Korea
3rd place, bronze medalist(s)		Chung Jae-hee	South Korea

The women's 500 metres competition in short track speed skating at the 2024 Winter Youth Olympics was held on 22 January, at the Gangneung Ice Arena in Gangneung.

== Results ==
=== Heats ===
Q – qualified for the quarterfinals

Rank	Heat	Name	Country	Time	Notes
1	1	Anna Falkowska	Poland	44.870	Q
2	1	Anastassiya Astrakhantseva	Kazakhstan	45.832	Q
3	1	Dina Špan	Slovenia	47.449	
4	1	Valentina Levickytė	Lithuania	49.057	
1	2	Yang Jingru	China	45.444	Q
2	2	Courtney Charlong	Canada	45.542	Q
3	2	Maiwenn Langevin	France	47.377	
4	2	Sonya Stoyanova	Bulgaria	1:07.821	
1	3	Angel Daleman	Netherlands	44.658	Q
2	3	Kyung Eun Jang	United States	46.246	Q
3	3	Nonomi Inoue	Japan	46.250	q
1	4	Kang Min-ji	South Korea	44.514	Q
2	4	Diána Laura Végi	Hungary	44.585	Q
3	4	Diana Demochko	Ukraine	48.370	
4	4	Kamilla Salmiņa	Latvia	48.443	
1	5	Chung Jae-hee	South Korea	44.739	Q
2	5	Eliza Rhodehamel	United States	46.358	Q
3	5	Sara Martinelli	Italy	47.074	
4	5	Madara Gintere	Latvia	49.949	
1	6	Dóra Szigeti	Hungary	45.216	Q
2	6	Océane Guerard	Canada	45.367	Q
3	6	Eva Bláhová	Czech Republic	47.996	
4	6	Veronika Kremer	Ukraine	48.844	
1	7	Kornelia Woźniak	Poland	45.021	Q
2	7	Birgit Radt	Netherlands	46.143	Q
3	7	Sara Merazzi	Italy	46.919	
4	7	Punpreeda Prempreecha	Thailand	47.029	
1	8	Li Jinzi	China	45.287	Q
2	8	Paula Torzewski-Kuhnt	Germany	45.590	Q
3	8	Lea Popovičová	Slovakia	45.839	q
4	8	Chan Sin Ying	Hong Kong	1:00.292	
1	9	Polina Omelchuk	Kazakhstan	45.230	Q
2	9	Aoi Yoshizawa	Japan	45.320	Q
3	9	Amelia Chua	Singapore	48.311	
4	9	Michaela Ižarová	Slovakia	1:07.347	

=== Quarterfinals ===
Q – qualified for the semifinals

Rank	Heat	Name	Country	Time	Notes
1	1	Anna Falkowska	Poland	44.545	Q
2	1	Kornelia Woźniak	Poland	44.637	Q
3	1	Océane Guerard	Canada	44.861	q
4	1	Courtney Charlong	Canada	45.019	
5	1	Nonomi Inoue	Japan	45.557	
1	2	Chung Jae-hee	South Korea	44.327	Q
2	2	Dóra Szigeti	Hungary	44.401	Q
3	2	Aoi Yoshizawa	Japan	44.554	q
4	2	Paula Torzewski-Kuhnt	Germany	46.028	
5	2	Lea Popovičová	Slovakia	46.220	
1	3	Angel Daleman	Netherlands	44.565	Q
2	3	Diána Laura Végi	Hungary	45.030	Q
3	3	Polina Omelchuk	Kazakhstan	45.062	
4	3	Eliza Rhodehamel	United States	45.841	
5	3	Anastassiya Astrakhantseva	Kazakhstan	1:04.707	
1	4	Kang Min-ji	South Korea	44.760	Q
2	4	Li Jinzi	China	44.878	Q
3	4	Yang Jingru	China	44.975	
4	4	Birgit Radt	Netherlands	45.101	
5	4	Kyung Eun Jang	South Korea	45.181	

=== Semifinals ===
QA – qualified for Final A
QB – qualified for Final B

Rank	Heat	Name	Country	Time	Notes
1	1	Anna Falkowska	Poland	44.231	QA
2	1	Kang Min-ji	South Korea	44.328	QA
3	1	Kornelia Woźniak	Poland	44.403	QA
4	1	Li Jinzi	China	44.501	QB
5	1	Océane Guerard	Canada	44.639	QB
1	2	Dóra Szigeti	Hungary	44.306	QA
2	2	Chung Jae-hee	South Korea	44.637	QA
3	2	Diána Laura Végi	Hungary	44.664	QB
4	2	Aoi Yoshizawa	Japan	44.935	QB
5	2	Angel Daleman	Netherlands	1:18.211	QB

=== Final B ===
Rank	Name	Country	Time	Notes
6	Océane Guerard	Canada	45.854	
7	Li Jinzi	China	45.888	
8	Diána Laura Végi	Hungary	45.932	
9	Aoi Yoshizawa	Japan	46.137	
	Angel Daleman	Netherlands	DNS	

=== Final A ===
Rank	Name	Country	Time	Notes
1st place, gold medalist(s)	Anna Falkowska	Poland	44.314	
2nd place, silver medalist(s)	Kang Min-ji	South Korea	44.484	
3rd place, bronze medalist(s)	Chung Jae-hee	South Korea	45.018	
4	Kornelia Woźniak	Poland	45.179	
5	Dóra Szigeti	Hungary	1:07.592	
