= Latvia at the 2026 Winter Olympics =

- Flag of Latvia
- IOC code: LAT
- NOC: Latvian Olympic Committee
- Website: www.olimpiade.lv (in Latvian)

in Milan and Cortina d'Ampezzo, Italy 6 February 2026 – 22 February 2026
- Competitors: 67 (52 men and 15 women) in 9 sports
- Flag bearers (opening): Kaspars Daugaviņš & Dženifera Ģērmane
- Flag bearers (closing): Roberts Kruzbergs & Patrīcija Eiduka
- Medals Ranked 24th: Gold 0 Silver 1 Bronze 1 Total 2

Winter Olympics appearances (overview)
- 1924; 1928; 1932; 1936; 1948–1988; 1992; 1994; 1998; 2002; 2006; 2010; 2014; 2018; 2022; 2026

Other related appearances
- Soviet Union (1956–1988)

Latvia competed at the 2026 Winter Olympics in Milan and Cortina d'Ampezzo, Italy, from 6 to 22 February 2026. This was the nation's thirteenth appearance at the Olympic Winter Games. The nation made its debut at Chamonix 1924, and except for missing the Lake Placid games in 1932 because of the Great Depression, participated in every winter games until World War II, making its return to the 1936 games in Garmisch Partenkirchen. After the war, the nation was occupied by the Soviet Union. Except for St Moritz 1948, from the 1956 Cortina games through Calgary 1988, Latvians competed as part of Soviet teams. Following the Fall of the USSR in 1991, Latvia regained independence, and it has competed in every Winter Olympics since the Albertville games in 1992.

Kaspars Daugaviņš and Dženifera Ģērmane were the country's flagbearers during the opening ceremony. Meanwhile, Roberts Kruzbergs and Patrīcija Eiduka were the country's flagbearers during the closing ceremony.

== Competitors ==
The following is the list of number of competitors participating at the Games per sport/discipline.

Sport	Men	Women	Total
Alpine skiing	1	2	3
Biathlon	4	4	8
Bobsleigh	8	0	8
Cross-country skiing	3	4	7
Figure skating	2	0	2
Ice hockey	25	0	25
Luge	6	4	10
Short-track speed skating	2	0	2
Skeleton	1	1	2
Total	52	15	67

== Medallists ==
The following Latvian competitors won medals at the games. In the discipline sections below, the medallists' names are bolded.

Medal	Name	Sport	Event	Date
Silver	Elīna Ieva Bota	Luge	Women's singles	10 February
Bronze	Roberts Krūzbergs	Short-track speed skating	Men's 1500 metres	14 February

== Alpine skiing ==
Latvia qualified one male and one female alpine skier through the basic quota.

Athlete	Event	Run 1		Run 2		Total	
Athlete	Event	Time	Rank	Time	Rank	Time	Rank
Elvis Opmanis	Men's downhill	—N/a				1:59.24	32
Elvis Opmanis	Men's super-G	—N/a				1:32.05	35
Elvis Opmanis	Men's giant slalom	1:24.90	48	1:18.20	45	2:43.10	45
Liene Bondare	Women's slalom	53.95	53	58.30	42	1:52.25	43
Dženifera Ģērmane	Women's slalom	DNF					

== Biathlon ==
Latvia qualified four female and four male biathletes through the 2024–25 Biathlon World Cup score.

Men

Athlete	Event	Time	Misses	Rank
Renārs Birkentāls	Men's individual	57:00.7	2 (1+1+0+0)	31
Rihards Lozbers	Men's individual	1:05:25.7	8 (3+4+1+0)	88
Edgars Mise	Men's individual	1:04:51.0	6 (1+1+1+3)	83
Andrejs Rastorgujevs	Men's individual	57:51.4	3 (1+0+1+1)	41
Renārs Birkentāls	Men's sprint	26:41.4	5 (3+2)	77
Rihards Lozbers	Men's sprint	25:05.2	2 (1+1)	32
Edgars Mise	Men's sprint	25:42.9	1 (0+1)	52
Andrejs Rastorgujevs	Men's sprint	24:56.9	1 (0+1)	30
Rihards Lozbers	Men's pursuit	36:29.2	7 (3+1+1+2)	47
Edgars Mise	Men's pursuit	LAP		
Andrejs Rastorgujevs	Men's pursuit	34:40.8	3 (0+0+1+2)	29
Andrejs Rastorgujevs; Renārs Birkentāls; Rihards Lozbers; Edgars Mise	Team relay	1:26:39.1	18 (5+13)	18

Women

Athlete	Event	Time	Misses	Rank
Baiba Bendika	Women's individual	44:20.8	4 (0+1+2+1)	22
Sanita Buliņa	Women's individual	46:55.5	3 (1+0+1+1)	58
Annija Keita Sabule	Women's individual	47:21.1	3 (1+1+1+0)	64
Estere Volfa	Women's individual	45:07.7	3 (1+1+0+1)	36
Baiba Bendika	Women's sprint	22:03.5	2 (0+2)	15
Sanita Buliņa	Women's sprint	22:48.2	0 (0+0)	38
Annija Keita Sabule	Women's sprint	24:00.3	2 (1+1)	71
Estere Volfa	Women's sprint	22:07.6	1 (0+1)	16
Baiba Bendika	Women's pursuit	34:17.2	7 (2+2+1+2)	42
Sanita Buliņa	Women's pursuit	35:08.1	4 (0+1+0+3)	53
Estere Volfa	Women's pursuit	31:49.9	1 (0+0+1+0)	11
Baiba Bendika	Women's mass start	39:49.8	5 (3+1+1+0)	22
Estere Volfa	Women's mass start	39:50.1	4 (0+0+2+2)	23
Estere Volfa; Baiba Bendika; Sanita Buliņa; Annija Keita Sabule	Team relay	1:15:59.4	17 (3+14)	17

Mixed

Athlete	Event	Time	Misses	Rank
Andrejs Rastorgujevs; Renārs Birkentāls; Baiba Bendika; Estere Volfa	Relay	1:07:28.5	11 (2+9)	12

== Bobsleigh ==
Athlete	Event	Run 1		Run 2		Run 3		Run 4		Total	
Athlete	Event	Time	Rank	Time	Rank	Time	Rank	Time	Rank	Time	Rank
Jēkabs Kalenda*; Matīss Miknis	Two-man	55.68	9	55.75	4	55.64	10	55.61	7	3:42.68	8
Jēkabs Kalenda*; Mairis Kļava; Matīss Miknis; Lauris Kaufmanis	Four-man	54.64	10	55.23	17	54.85	10	55.00	9	3:39.72	10

== Cross-country skiing ==
Latvia qualified one male and one female cross-country skier through the basic quota. Following the completion of the 2024–25 FIS Cross-Country World Cup, Latvia qualified a further two female and two male athletes.

Distance

Men

Athlete	Event	Classical		Freestyle		Final		
Athlete	Event	Time	Rank	Time	Rank	Time	Deficit	Rank
Lauris Kaparkalējs	Men's freestyle	—N/a		24:36.2	76	—N/a		
Niks Saulītis	Men's freestyle	—N/a		24:33.4	75	—N/a		
Niks Saulītis	Men's classical	LAP	51	—N/a				
Raimo Vīgants	Men's freestyle	—N/a		22:48.3	46	—N/a		
Raimo Vīgants	Men's skiathlon	25:29.2	46	25:57.2	54	52:01.8	5:50.8	51
Raimo Vīgants	Men's classical	2:22:20.2	31	—N/a				

Women

Athlete	Event	Classical		Freestyle		Final		
Athlete	Event	Time	Rank	Time	Rank	Time	Deficit	Rank
Kitija Auziņa	Women's freestyle	—N/a		26:36.6	61	—N/a		
Patrīcija Eiduka	Women's freestyle	—N/a		24:33.3	15	—N/a		
Patrīcija Eiduka	Women's skiathlon	29:42.1	29	27:46.4	14	58:02.4	+4:17.2	23
Patrīcija Eiduka	Women's classical	2:25:42.1	11	—N/a				
Linda Kaparkalēja	Women's freestyle	—N/a		29:53.3	94	—N/a		
Samanta Krampe	Women's freestyle	—N/a		31:20.7	101	—N/a		
Patrīcija Eiduka; Kitija Auziņa; Linda Kaparkalēja; Samanta Krampe	4 × 7.5 km relay	—N/a				LAP		17

Sprint

Men

Athlete	Event	Qualification		Quarterfinal		Semifinal		Final	
Athlete	Event	Time	Rank	Time	Rank	Time	Rank	Time	Rank
Lauris Kaparkalējs	Men's sprint	3:28.33	57	Did not advance					
Niks Saulītis	Men's sprint	3:38.38	77	Did not advance					
Raimo Vīgants	Men's sprint	3:26.26	52	Did not advance					
Lauris Kaparkalējs; Raimo Vīgants	Men's team sprint	6:05.25	17	—N/a				Did not advance	

Women

Athlete	Event	Qualification		Quarterfinal		Semifinal		Final	
Athlete	Event	Time	Rank	Time	Rank	Time	Rank	Time	Rank
Kitija Auziņa	Women's sprint	4:16.03	70	Did not advance					
Linda Kaparkalēja	Women's sprint	4:27.62	82	Did not advance					
Samanta Krampe	Women's sprint	4:22.81	76	Did not advance					
Kitija Auziņa; Patrīcija Eiduka	Women's team sprint	6:59.90	12 **Q**	—N/a				21:56.05	13

== Figure skating ==
In the 2025 World Figure Skating Championships in Boston, the United States, Latvia secured two quota in each of the men's singles.

Athlete	Event	SP/SD		FP/FD		Total	
Athlete	Event	Points	Rank	Points	Rank	Points	Rank
Fedirs Kuļišs	Men's singles	66.86	28	Did not advance			
Deniss Vasiļjevs	Men's singles	82.44	17 **Q**	144.02	18	226.46	18

== Ice hockey ==
Summary

Key:

- OT – Overtime
- GWS – Match decided by penalty-shootout

Team	Event	Group stage				Qualification playoff	Quarterfinal	Semifinal	Final / BM	
Team	Event	Opposition Score	Opposition Score	Opposition Score	Rank	Opposition Score	Opposition Score	Opposition Score	Opposition Score	Rank
Latvia men's	Men's tournament	United States; **L** 5–1	Germany; **W** 4–3	Denmark; **L** 4–2	4 **Q**	Sweden; **L** 5–1	Did not advance			10

=== Men's tournament ===
Latvia men's national ice hockey team qualified a team of 25 players by winning a final qualification tournament.

Roster

The first six players of Latvia's roster were announced on 16 June 2025. The remaining roster was named on 6 January 2026. On 12 January, forward Eriks Mateiko was ruled out for the remainder of the season and Olympics after his Achilles tendon was accidentally cut by a skate blade during a Hershey Bears game; he was replaced on the roster by Anrī Ravinskis. On 18 January, forward Rodrigo Ābols was ruled out after suffering a lower-body injury the previous day, and was replaced by Rihards Bukarts. On 10 February, Kaspars Daugaviņš was named Latvia's captain, with Uvis Balinskis and Zemgus Girgensons serving as alternate captains.

Head coach: Harijs Vītoliņš

No.	Pos.	Name	Height	Weight	Birthdate	Team
3	D	Alberts Šmits	1.93 m (6 ft 4 in)	93 kg (205 lb)	2 December 2007 (aged 18)	(Finland) Jukurit
9	F	Renārs Krastenbergs	1.83 m (6 ft 0 in)	87 kg (192 lb)	26 December 1998 (aged 27)	(Czech Republic) HC Olomouc
11	F	Dans Ločmelis	1.85 m (6 ft 1 in)	81 kg (179 lb)	21 January 2004 (aged 22)	(United States) Providence Bruins
13	F	Rihards Bukarts	1.80 m (5 ft 11 in)	84 kg (185 lb)	31 December 1995 (aged 30)	(Slovakia) HC Prešov
16	F	Kaspars Daugaviņš – **C**	1.83 m (6 ft 0 in)	102 kg (225 lb)	18 May 1988 (aged 37)	(Germany) Kassel Huskies
17	F	Mārtiņš Dzierkals	1.83 m (6 ft 0 in)	91 kg (201 lb)	4 April 1997 (aged 28)	(Czech Republic) Sparta Praha
21	F	Rūdolfs Balcers	1.80 m (5 ft 11 in)	80 kg (176 lb)	8 April 1997 (aged 28)	(Switzerland) ZSC Lions
22	F	Sandis Vilmanis	1.85 m (6 ft 1 in)	88 kg (194 lb)	23 January 2004 (aged 22)	(United States) Florida Panthers
23	F	Teodors Bļugers	1.85 m (6 ft 1 in)	86 kg (190 lb)	15 August 1994 (aged 31)	(Canada) Vancouver Canucks
26	D	Uvis Balinskis – **A**	1.85 m (6 ft 1 in)	90 kg (198 lb)	1 August 1996 (aged 29)	(United States) Florida Panthers
27	D	Oskars Cibuļskis	1.88 m (6 ft 2 in)	94 kg (207 lb)	9 April 1988 (aged 37)	(Denmark) Herning Blue Fox
28	F	Zemgus Girgensons – **A**	1.88 m (6 ft 2 in)	90 kg (198 lb)	5 January 1994 (aged 32)	(United States) Tampa Bay Lightning
29	D	Ralfs Freibergs	1.83 m (6 ft 0 in)	88 kg (194 lb)	17 May 1991 (aged 34)	(Czech Republic) Vítkovice Ridera
30	G	Elvis Merzļikins	1.91 m (6 ft 3 in)	90 kg (198 lb)	13 April 1994 (aged 31)	(United States) Columbus Blue Jackets
31	G	Artūrs Šilovs	1.93 m (6 ft 4 in)	93 kg (205 lb)	22 March 2001 (aged 24)	(United States) Pittsburgh Penguins
34	F	Eduards Tralmaks	1.93 m (6 ft 4 in)	100 kg (220 lb)	17 February 1997 (aged 28)	(United States) Grand Rapids Griffins
43	F	Anrī Ravinskis	1.93 m (6 ft 4 in)	94 kg (207 lb)	2 January 2003 (aged 23)	(Canada) Abbotsford Canucks
50	G	Kristers Gudļevskis	1.93 m (6 ft 4 in)	97 kg (214 lb)	31 July 1992 (aged 33)	(Germany) Fischtown Pinguins
55	D	Roberts Mamčics	1.98 m (6 ft 6 in)	104 kg (229 lb)	6 April 1995 (aged 30)	(Czech Republic) Energie Karlovy Vary
71	F	Roberts Bukarts	1.83 m (6 ft 0 in)	84 kg (185 lb)	27 June 1990 (aged 35)	(Slovakia) Dukla Trenčín
72	D	Jānis Jaks	1.83 m (6 ft 0 in)	89 kg (196 lb)	22 August 1995 (aged 30)	(Czech Republic) Energie Karlovy Vary
77	D	Kristaps Zīle	1.85 m (6 ft 1 in)	90 kg (198 lb)	24 December 1997 (aged 28)	(Czech Republic) Bílí Tygři Liberec
94	D	Kristiāns Rubīns	1.93 m (6 ft 4 in)	99 kg (218 lb)	11 December 1997 (aged 28)	(Czech Republic) Škoda Plzeň
95	F	Oskars Batņa	1.96 m (6 ft 5 in)	106 kg (234 lb)	7 May 1995 (aged 30)	(Finland) Pelicans
97	F	Haralds Egle	1.80 m (5 ft 11 in)	86 kg (190 lb)	11 May 1996 (aged 29)	(Czech Republic) Energie Karlovy Vary

Group play

Pos	Team	Pld	W	OTW	OTL	L	GF	GA	GD	Pts	Qualification
1	United States	3	3	0	0	0	16	5	+11	**9**	Advance to quarterfinals
2	Germany	3	1	0	0	2	7	10	−3	**3 (Note: Head-to-head points: 3 each. Head-to-head goal difference: Germany +1; Denmark 0; Latvia −1.)**	Advance to qualification playoffs
3	Denmark	3	1	0	0	2	8	11	−3	**3**	Advance to qualification playoffs
4	Latvia	3	1	0	0	2	7	12	−5	**3**	Advance to qualification playoffs

Source: IIHF
Rules for classification: Tiebreak criteria
Notes:

12 February 2026; 21:10	Latvia	**1–5** (1–1, 0–3, 0–1)	**United States**	PalaItalia, Milan; Attendance: 11,288

Game reference

Elvis Merzļikins
Artūrs Šilovs
Goalies
Connor Hellebuyck
Referees:
(Canada) Michael Campbell
(United States) Kyle Rehman
Linesmen:
(Denmark) Albert Ankerstjerne
(Czech Republic) Libor Suchánek

	0–1	05:29 – B. Tkachuk (M. Tkachuk, Werenski)
Krastenbergs (Girgensons) – 07:25	1–1
	1–2	30:38 – Nelson (J. Hughes, Trocheck)
	1–3	37:35 – Thompson (Eichel, Q. Hughes) (PP)
	1–4	39:48 – Nelson (J. Hughes, M. Tkachuk)
	1–5	42:35 – Matthews (Eichel, Q. Hughes) (PP)

8 min
Penalties
8 min
18
Shots
38

14 February 2026; 12:10	Germany	**3–4** (2–1, 0–1, 1–2)	**Latvia**	Fiera Milano, Milan; Attendance: 4,033

Game reference

Philipp Grubauer
Goalies
Artūrs Šilovs
Referees:
(Canada) Gord Dwyer
(United States) Sean MacFarlane
Linesmen:
(Canada) Scott Cherrey
(Finland) Onni Hautamäki

Reichel (Kahun, Kälble) – 02:06	1–0
	1–1	15:48 – Ločmelis (Girgensons, Krastenbergs) (PP)
Kälble (Tiffels) – 16:56	2–1
	2–2	28:02 – Ločmelis (Balcers, Balinskis) (PP2)
	2–3	48:32 – Tralmaks (Girgensons, Jaks)
	2–4	51:37 – Krastenbergs (Daugaviņš, Šmits)
Stützle (Draisaitl, Peterka) (EA) – 57:41	3–4

8 min
Penalties
8 min
29
Shots
22

15 February 2026; 19:10	**Denmark**	**4–2** (3–1, 0–1, 1–0)	Latvia	Fiera Milano, Milan; Attendance: 3,983

Game reference

Frederik Andersen
Goalies
Artūrs Šilovs
Referees:
(Canada) Eric Furlatt
(Germany) André Schrader
Linesmen:
(Canada) David Brisebois
(United States) Jake Davis

Olesen (Aagaard) – 00:23	1–0
Aagaard (Olesen, Wejse) (PP) – 04:54	2–0
Ehlers (Bjorkstrand, Lauridsen) – 16:28	3–0
	3–1	19:44 – Zīle (Jaks, Tralmaks) (EA)
	3–2	26:47 – Tralmaks (Zīle, Girgensons)
Olesen (Lauridsen, Eller) (EN) – 57:38	4–2

10 min
Penalties
10 min
21
Shots
35

Qualification play-offs

17 February 2026; 21:10	**Sweden**	**5–1** (2–0, 1–1, 2–0)	Latvia	PalaItalia, Milan; Attendance: 11,088

Game reference

Jacob Markström
Goalies
Elvis Merzļikins
Referees:
(Canada) Gord Dwyer
(United States) Sean MacFarlane
Linesmen:
(Czech Republic) Daniel Hynek
(United States) Jonny Murray

Kempe (Eriksson Ek, Nylander) – 10:55	1–0
Landeskog (Raymond, Zibanejad) – 11:36	2–0
Forsberg (Karlsson, Broberg) – 27:36	3–0
	3–1	30:47 – Tralmaks (Smits, Bļugers)
Zibanejad (Raymond, Landeskog) – 45:54	4–1
Nylander (Raymond, Dahlin) – 53:18	5–1

6 min
Penalties
4 min
28
Shots
21

== Luge ==
Men

Athlete	Event	Run 1		Run 2		Run 3		Run 4		Total	
Athlete	Event	Time	Rank	Time	Rank	Time	Rank	Time	Rank	Time	Rank
Kristers Aparjods	Singles	53.221	4	53.113	4	53.208	7	53.070	4	3:32.612	4
Gints Bērziņš	Singles	53.462	10	53.424	9	53.415	9	53.742	17	3:34.043	10
Mārtiņš Bots; Roberts Plūme	Doubles	52.604	6	52.680	5	—N/a				1:45.284	5
Lūkass Krasts; Eduards Ševics-Mikeļševics	Doubles	52.749	9	52.934	11	—N/a				1:45.683	9

Women

Athlete	Event	Run 1		Run 2		Run 3		Run 4		Total	
Athlete	Event	Time	Rank	Time	Rank	Time	Rank	Time	Rank	Time	Rank
Kendija Aparjode	Singles	55.059	24	52.961	8	53.049	8	52.919	5	3:33.988	16
**Elīna Ieva Bota**	Singles	52.878	5	52.805	3	52.939	4	52.921	6	3:31.543	2nd place, silver medalist(s)
Kitija Bogdanova; Marta Robežniece	Doubles	53.492	4	53.304	3	—N/a				1:46.796	4

Mixed

Athlete	Event	Women's singles		Men's doubles		Men's singles		Women's doubles		Total	
Athlete	Event	Time	Rank	Time	Rank	Time	Rank	Time	Rank	Time	Rank
Elīna Ieva Bota; Mārtiņš Bots / Roberts Plūme; Kristers Aparjods; Marta Robežniece / Kitija Bogdanova	Team relay	55.684	2	55.800	5	54.989	3	56.276	4	3:42.749	4

== Short-track speed skating ==
Latvia qualified two male short-track speed skaters after the conclusion of the 2025–26 ISU Short Track World Tour.

Athlete	Event	Heat		Quarterfinal		Semifinal		Final	
Athlete	Event	Time	Rank	Time	Rank	Time	Rank	Time	Rank
Reinis Bērziņš	Men's 500 m	41.758	3	Did not advance					
Reinis Bērziņš	Men's 1000 m	1:25.741	2 **Q**	1:25.379	4	Did not advance			
**Roberts Krūzbergs**	Men's 1000 m	1:25.341	3 **ADV**	1:27.133	2 **Q**	1:23.700	3 **q FA**	1:24.681	5
**Roberts Krūzbergs**	Men's 1500 m	—N/a		2:18.237	1 **Q**	2:53.239	3 **ADV FA**	2:12.376	3rd place, bronze medalist(s)

Qualification legend: Q - Qualify based on position in heat; q - Qualify based on time in field; FA - Qualify to medal final; ADV - Advanced based on referee decision

== Skeleton ==
Athlete	Event	Run 1		Run 2		Run 3		Run 4		Total	
Athlete	Event	Time	Rank	Time	Rank	Time	Rank	Time	Rank	Time	Rank
Emīls Indriksons	Men's	57.29	17	57.11	17	56.95	16	57.15	18	3:48.50	18
Marta Andžāne	Women's	58.37	19	58.15	18	58.32	18	58.09	12	3:52.93	17
Emīls Indriksons; Marta Andžāne	Mixed team	1:01.67	12	59.99	13	—N/a				2:01.66	13

== See also ==
- Latvia at the 2026 Winter Paralympics
