= Short-track speed skating at the 2022 Winter Olympics – Men's 500 metres =

Men's 500 metres at the XXIV Olympic Winter Games
- Short track speed skating
- Venue: Capital Indoor Stadium, Beijing
- Date: 11 and 13 February 2022
- Competitors: 32 from 17 nations
- Winning time: 40.338

Medalists
1st place, gold medalist(s)		Shaoang Liu	Hungary
2nd place, silver medalist(s)		Konstantin Ivliev	ROC
3rd place, bronze medalist(s)		Steven Dubois	Canada

The men's 500 metres competition in short track speed skating at the 2022 Winter Olympics was held on 11 February (heats) and 13 February (finals), at the Capital Indoor Stadium in Beijing. Shaoang Liu of Hungary won the event, his first individual Olympic gold. Konstantin Ivliev, representing the Russian Olympic committee, won silver, his first Olympic medal. Steven Dubois of Canada won the bronze medal.

The defending champion is Wu Dajing. The bronze medalist, Lim Hyo-jun, qualified for the Olympics as well but will be representing China rather than South Korea, which he represented in 2018. Shaoang Liu is the 2021 World Short Track Speed Skating champion at the 500 m distance. Semion Elistratov and Pietro Sighel are the silver and bronze medalists, respectively. Many top athletes did not participate in the championship, however. Shaolin Sándor Liu was leading the 2021–22 ISU Short Track Speed Skating World Cup at the 500 m distance with four races completed before the Olympics, followed by Wu Dajing and Ren Ziwei. Wu Dajing is also the world and Olympic record holder.

== Qualification ==
Countries were assigned quotas based on their performance during the 2021–22 ISU Short Track Speed Skating World Cup, with the top 32 athletes (maximum of three per country qualifying quotas. If a NOC declined a quota spot, it was distributed to the next available athlete, only if the maximum quota of 56 athletes per gender was not surpassed.

== Records ==
Prior to this competition, the existing world and Olympic records were as follows.

World record	Wu Dajing (CHN)	39.505	Salt Lake City, United States	11 November 2018
Olympic record	Wu Dajing (CHN)	39.584	Gangneung, South Korea	22 February 2018

== Results ==
=== Heats ===
Rank	Heat	Name	Country	Time	Notes
1	1	Shaolin Sándor Liu	Hungary	40.948	Q
2	1	Sébastien Lepape	France	42.081	Q
3	1	Kota Kikuchi	Japan	42.176	
	1	Lee June-seo	South Korea		PEN
1	2	Ren Ziwei	China	40.669	Q
2	2	Adil Galiakhmetov	Kazakhstan	40.722	Q
3	2	Brendan Corey	Australia	41.097	
4	2	Maxime Laoun	Canada	No time	
1	3	Steven Dubois	Canada	40.399	Q
2	3	Pavel Sitnikov	ROC	40.591	Q
3	3	Andrea Cassinelli	Italy	42.791	
4	3	Oleh Handei	Ukraine	44.163	
1	4	Denis Nikisha	Kazakhstan	40.482	Q
2	4	Jordan Pierre-Gilles	Canada	40.488	Q
3	4	Stijn Desmet	Belgium	40.585	q
4	4	Katsunori Koike	Japan	41.199	
1	5	Konstantin Ivliev	ROC	40.272	Q
2	5	John-Henry Krueger	Hungary	40.407	Q
3	5	Roberts Krūzbergs	Latvia	40.430	q
4	5	Quentin Fercoq	France	40.548	
1	6	Abzal Azhgaliyev	Kazakhstan	40.870	Q
2	6	Hwang Dae-heon	South Korea	40.971	Q
3	6	Ryan Pivirotto	United States	41.018	q
4	6	Itzhak de Laat	Netherlands	No time	
1	7	Shaoang Liu	Hungary	40.797	Q
2	7	Vladislav Bykanov	Israel	40.900	Q
3	7	Sun Long	China	42.871	ADV
	7	Jens van 't Wout	Netherlands		PEN
1	8	Wu Dajing	China	40.230	Q
2	8	Pietro Sighel	Italy	40.350	Q
3	8	Sidney Chu	Hong Kong	44.857	
4	8	Dylan Hoogerwerf	Netherlands	No time	

=== Quarterfinals ===
Rank	Heat	Name	Country	Time	Notes
1	1	Denis Nikisha	Kazakhstan	40.355	Q
2	1	Pavel Sitnikov	ROC	40.643	Q
3	1	Ren Ziwei	China	40.714	
4	1	Sun Long	China	40.779	
5	1	Adil Galiakhmetov	Kazakhstan	40.925	
1	2	Wu Dajing	China	40.528	Q
2	2	Pietro Sighel	Italy	40.644	Q
3	2	Roberts Krūzbergs	Latvia	40.694	q
4	2	Shaolin Sándor Liu	Hungary	40.700	
5	2	Sébastien Lepape	France	46.814	
1	3	Konstantin Ivliev	ROC	40.351	Q
2	3	Hwang Dae-heon	South Korea	40.636	Q
3	3	Abzal Azhgaliyev	Kazakhstan	40.643	q
4	3	Stijn Desmet	Belgium	40.718	
5	3	John-Henry Krueger	Hungary	40.844	
1	4	Shaoang Liu	Hungary	40.386	Q
2	4	Steven Dubois	Canada	40.494	Q
3	4	Vladislav Bykanov	Israel	41.157	
4	4	Ryan Pivirotto	United States	41.841	
5	4	Jordan Pierre-Gilles	Canada	No time	

=== Semifinals ===
Rank	Heat	Name	Country	Time	Notes
1	1	Konstantin Ivliev	ROC	40.655	QA
2	1	Pietro Sighel	Italy	40.847	QA
3	1	Pavel Sitnikov	ROC	40.848	QB
4	1	Denis Nikisha	Kazakhstan	41.005	QB
5	1	Roberts Krūzbergs	Latvia	41.870	
1	2	Shaoang Liu	Hungary	40.157	QA
2	2	Abzal Azhgaliyev	Kazakhstan	40.462	QA
3	2	Wu Dajing	China	40.478	QB
4	2	Steven Dubois	Canada	40.825	ADVA
	2	Hwang Dae-heon	South Korea		PEN

=== Finals ===
==== Final B ====
Rank	Name	Country	Time	Notes
6	Wu Dajing	China	41.157	
7	Pavel Sitnikov	ROC	41.217	
8	Denis Nikisha	Kazakhstan	41.329	
9	Roberts Krūzbergs	Latvia	41.465	

==== Final A ====
Rank	Name	Country	Time	Notes
1st place, gold medalist(s)	Shaoang Liu	Hungary	40.338	
2nd place, silver medalist(s)	Konstantin Ivliev	ROC	40.431	
3rd place, bronze medalist(s)	Steven Dubois	Canada	40.669	
4	Abzal Azhgaliyev	Kazakhstan	40.869	
5	Pietro Sighel	Italy	No time	
