= 2023 World Junior Short Track Speed Skating Championships =

2023 speed skating competition in Dresden, Germany

- Venue: Dresden, Germany
- Dates: 27–29 January
- Competitors: 165 from 36 nations

The 2023 World Junior Short Track Speed Skating Championships took place between 27 and 29 January 2023 in Joynext Arena in Dresden, Germany.

== Medal summary ==
=== Medal table ===
Rank	Nation	Gold	Silver	Bronze	Total
1	South Korea	6	2	3	11
2	Canada	1	3	0	4
3	Poland	1	0	1	2
4	China	0	1	2	3
5	United States	0	1	1	2
6	Japan	0	1	0	1
7	Hungary	0	0	1	1
Totals (7 entries)		8	8	8	24

=== Medalists ===
==== Men ====
Event	Gold		Silver		Bronze	
500 metres	Michał Niewiński; Poland	41.093	Marcus Howard; United States	41.286	Li Kun; China	41.425
1000 metres	Lee Dong-hyun; South Korea	1:23.549 JWR	Shin Dong-min; South Korea	1:23.701	Michał Niewiński; Poland	1:23.814
1500 metres	Lee Dong-hyun; South Korea	2:11.934	Shin Dong-min; South Korea	2:12.064	Lee Dong-min; South Korea	2:12.167
3000 metres relay	South Korea; Lee Do-gyu; Lee Dong-hyun; Lee Dong-min; Shin Dong-min	3:57.263	Japan; Kosei Hayashi; Teruhisa Miyoshi; Emu Natsume; Takumi Wada	4:01.665	United States; Marcus Howard; Justin Liu; Ryan Shane; Seung-min Kwon	4:01.863

==== Women ====
Event	Gold		Silver		Bronze	
500 metres	Florence Brunelle; Canada	44.827	Ann-Sophie Bachand; Canada	45.273	Song Jiarui; China	45.360
1000 metres	Kim Gil-li; South Korea	1:32.294	Florence Brunelle; Canada	1:32.780	Oh Song-mi; South Korea	1:32.960
1500 metres	Kim Gil-li; South Korea	2:36.639	Florence Brunelle; Canada	2:36.786	Oh Song-mi; South Korea	2:36.873
3000 metres relay	South Korea; Kim Gil-li; Kim Ji-won; Oh Song-mi; Seo Su-ah	4:15.635	China; Cai Shenyi; Song Jiarui; Wang Ye; Zhang Jianing	4:16.342	Hungary; Eszter Tóth; Maja Somodi; Melinda Schönborn; Dóra Szigeti	4:20.310
