= Short-track speed skating at the 2024 Winter Youth Olympics – Women's 1000 metres =

Women's 1000 metres at the IV Winter Youth Olympic Games
- Venue: Gangneung Ice Arena
- Dates: 21 January
- Competitors: 35 from 22 nations
- Winning time: 1:40.803

Medalists
| 1st place, gold medalist(s) | | Li Jinzi | China |
| 2nd place, silver medalist(s) | | Yang Jingru | China |
| 3rd place, bronze medalist(s) | | Polina Omelchuk | Kazakhstan |

The women's 1000 metres competition in short track speed skating at the 2024 Winter Youth Olympics was held on 21 January, at the Gangneung Ice Arena in Gangneung.

== Results ==
=== Heats ===
Q – qualified for the quarterfinals

| Rank | Heat | Name | Country | Time | Notes |
|---|---|---|---|---|---|
| 1 | 1 | Kang Min-ji | South Korea | 1:37.969 | Q |
| 2 | 1 | Eliza Rhodehamel | United States | 1:38.247 | Q |
| 3 | 1 | Birgit Radt | Netherlands | 1:38.369 | |
| 4 | 1 | Punpreeda Prempreecha | Thailand | 1:39.344 | |
| 1 | 2 | Chung Jae-hee | South Korea | 1:37.899 | Q |
| 2 | 2 | Kornelia Woźniak | Poland | 1:38.167 | Q |
| 3 | 2 | Sonya Stoyanova | Bulgaria | 1:56.596 | |
| 4 | 2 | Kamilla Salmiņa | Latvia | 1:56.768 | |
| 1 | 3 | Angel Daleman | Netherlands | 1:36.804 | Q |
| 2 | 3 | Kyung Eun Jang | United States | 1:38.262 | Q |
| 3 | 3 | Sara Martinelli | Italy | 1:38.426 | |
| 4 | 3 | Chan Sin Ying | Hong Kong | 2:00.656 | |
| 1 | 4 | Anastassiya Astrakhantseva | Kazakhstan | 1:39.806 | Q |
| 2 | 4 | Sara Merazzi | Italy | 1:40.850 | Q |
| 3 | 4 | Dina Špan | Slovenia | 1:42.319 | |
| 4 | 4 | Madara Gintere | Latvia | 1:47.534 | |
| 1 | 5 | Nonomi Inoue | Japan | 1:36.646 | Q |
| 2 | 5 | Courtney Charlong | Canada | 1:36.743 | Q |
| 3 | 5 | Michaela Ižarová | Slovakia | 1:39.144 | |
| 4 | 5 | Diana Demochko | Ukraine | 1:58.732 | |
| 1 | 6 | Anna Falkowska | Poland | 1:39.019 | Q |
| 2 | 6 | Dóra Szigeti | Hungary | 1:39.192 | Q |
| 3 | 6 | Eva Bláhová | Czech Republic | 1:40.187 | |
| 4 | 6 | Veronika Kremer | Ukraine | 1:40.527 | |
| 1 | 7 | Diána Laura Végi | Hungary | 1:36.259 | Q |
| 2 | 7 | Paula Torzewski-Kuhnt | Germany | 1:36.323 | Q |
| 3 | 7 | Lea Popovičová | Slovakia | 1:37.907 | q |
| 4 | 7 | Amelia Chua | Singapore | 1:38.738 | |
| 1 | 8 | Li Jinzi | South Korea | 1:35.908 | Q |
| 2 | 8 | Polina Omelchuk | Kazakhstan | 1:36.334 | Q |
| 3 | 8 | Océane Guerard | Canada | 1:37.336 | q |
| 1 | 9 | Yang Jingru | China | 1:37.155 | Q |
| 2 | 9 | Aoi Yoshizawa | Japan | 1:37.171 | Q |
| 3 | 9 | Maiwenn Langevin | France | 1:38.924 | |
| 4 | 9 | Valentina Levickytė | Lithuania | 1:42.426 | |

=== Quarterfinals ===
Q – qualified for the semifinals

| Rank | Heat | Name | Country | Time | Notes |
|---|---|---|---|---|---|
| 1 | 1 | Chung Jae-hee | South Korea | 1:32.608 | Q |
| 2 | 1 | Océane Guerard | Canada | 1:33.025 | Q |
| 3 | 1 | Polina Omelchuk | Kazakhstan | 1:33.253 | q |
| 4 | 1 | Kornelia Woźniak | Poland | 1:33.350 | |
| 5 | 1 | Nonomi Inoue | Japan | 1:33.523 | |
| 1 | 2 | Kang Min-ji | South Korea | 1:32.476 | Q |
| 2 | 2 | Diána Laura Végi | Hungary | 1:32.552 | Q |
| 3 | 2 | Paula Torzewski-Kuhnt | Germany | 1:33.491 | q |
| 4 | 2 | Eliza Rhodehamel | United States | 1:33.595 | |
| 5 | 2 | Sara Merazzi | Italy | 1:35.603 | |
| 1 | 3 | Yang Jingru | China | 1:33.558 | Q |
| 2 | 3 | Angel Daleman | Netherlands | 1:33.625 | Q |
| 3 | 3 | Courtney Charlong | Canada | 1:33.719 | |
| 4 | 3 | Aoi Yoshizawa | Japan | 1:33.904 | |
| 5 | 3 | Lea Popovičová | Slovakia | 1:36.441 | |
| 1 | 4 | Li Jinzi | China | 1:36.258 | Q |
| 2 | 4 | Anna Falkowska | Poland | 1:36.283 | Q |
| 3 | 4 | Dóra Szigeti | Hungary | 1:36.527 | |
| 4 | 4 | Anastassiya Astrakhantseva | Kazakhstan | 1:37.164 | |
| 5 | 4 | Kyung Eun Jang | United States | 1:39.875 | |

=== Semifinals ===
QA – qualified for Final A
QB – qualified for Final B
ADVA – advanced to Final A

| Rank | Heat | Name | Country | Time | Notes |
|---|---|---|---|---|---|
| 1 | 1 | Yang Jingru | China | 1:32.344 | QA |
| 2 | 1 | Anna Falkowska | Poland | 1:32.543 | QA |
| 3 | 1 | Paula Torzewski-Kuhnt | Germany | 1:32.641 | QB |
| 4 | 1 | Chung Jae-hee | South Korea | 1:49.337 | QB |
| 5 | 1 | Angel Daleman | Netherlands | 1:53.033 | ADVA |
| 1 | 2 | Li Jinzi | China | 1:32.783 | QA |
| 2 | 2 | Polina Omelchuk | Kazakhstan | 1:32.918 | QA |
| 3 | 2 | Diána Laura Végi | Hungary | 1:32.921 | QB |
| 4 | 2 | Océane Guerard | Canada | 1:33.209 | QB |
| 5 | 2 | Kang Min-ji | South Korea | 2:13.974 | QB |

=== Final B ===
| Rank | Name | Country | Time | Notes |
|---|---|---|---|---|
| 6 | Kang Min-ji | South Korea | 1:32.012 | |
| 7 | Chung Jae-hee | South Korea | 1:32.447 | |
| 8 | Diána Laura Végi | Hungary | 1:32.509 | |
| 9 | Paula Torzewski-Kuhnt | Germany | 1:33.378 | |
| 10 | Océane Guerard | Canada | 1:33.401 | |

=== Final A ===
| Rank | Name | Country | Time | Notes |
|---|---|---|---|---|
| 1st place, gold medalist(s) | Li Jinzi | China | 1:40.803 | |
| 2nd place, silver medalist(s) | Yang Jingru | China | 1:40.996 | |
| 3rd place, bronze medalist(s) | Polina Omelchuk | Kazakhstan | 1:41.600 | |
| 4 | Anna Falkowska | Poland | 1:41.897 | |
| | Angel Daleman | Netherlands | PEN | |
