= Oleh Handei =

Ukrainian speed skater (born 1999)

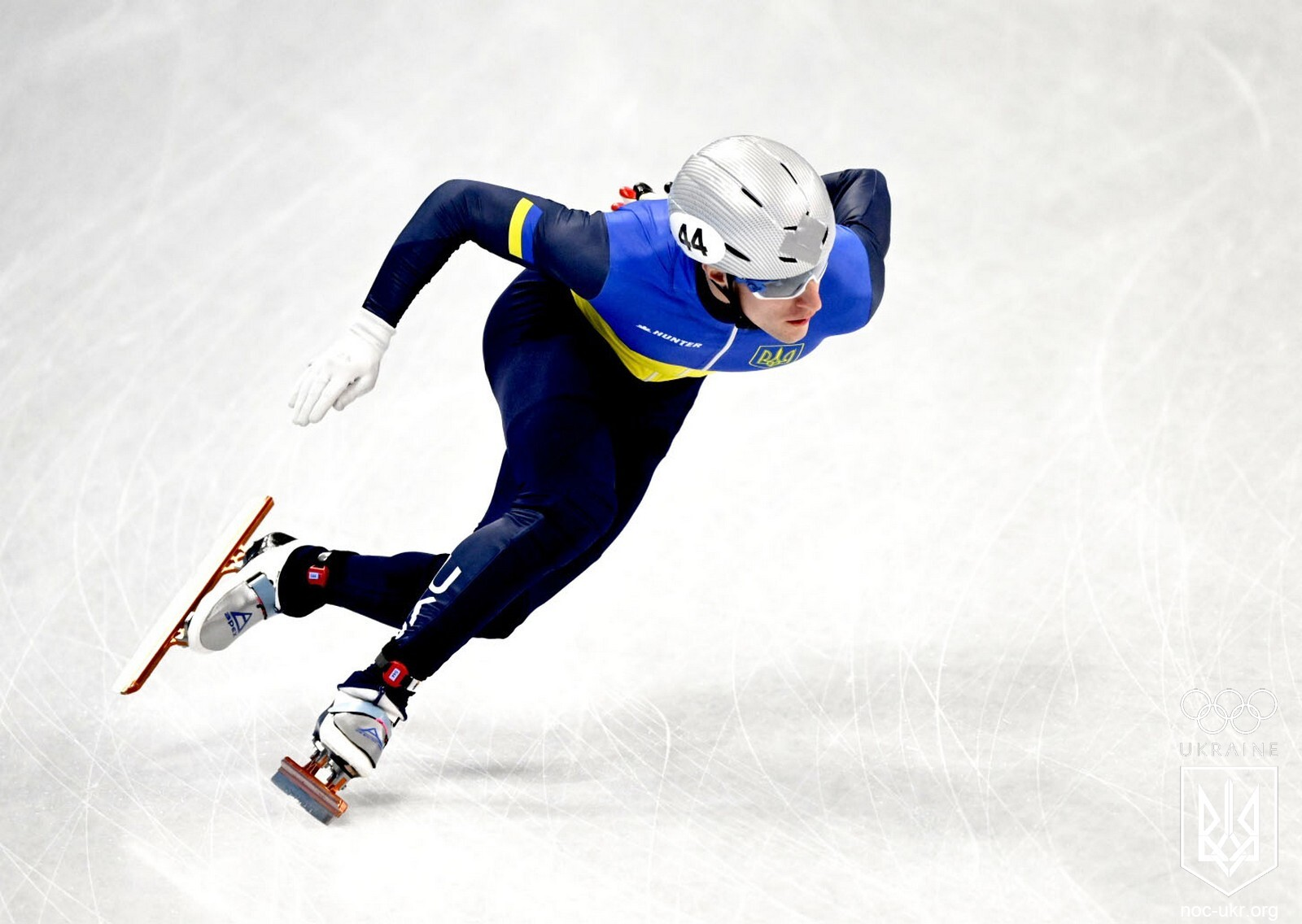
- Handei at the 2022 Winter Olympics

Personal information
- Full name: Гандей Олег Володимирович
- Nationality: Ukrainian
- Born: 5 March 1999 (age 27) Kyiv, Ukraine

Sport
- Sport: Short track speed skating

Oleh Volodymyrovych Handei (born March 5, 1999, in Kyiv, Ukraine) is a Ukrainian short track speed skater. He competed in the 500 metres event at the 2022 Winter Olympics, where he did not advance from the heat.

== Sporting career ==
Handei took up the sport in 2009 in his home city, Kyiv. Before that, he tried figure skating.

He started his international sporting career in late 2016 when he skated at the World Cup. He debuted during that season at the World Junior Championships. He represented Ukraine in various competitions over the following seasons.

Handei qualified for his first Winter Games in Beijing based on his performances during the 2021–22 World Cup.

Handei qualified for the 2026 Winter Olympics in the 500-meter and 1,500-meter events. He planned to wear a helmet with the phrase "Where there is heroism, there is no final defeat" by Ukrainian poet Lina Kostenko, but was forbidden by the International Skating Union as a political slogan. He disputed the order, asserting it was a motivational quote rather than being related to the Russo-Ukrainian war.

== Results ==
=== Winter Olympics ===
Year	Host	500 m	1000 m	1500 m	Relay	Mixed relay
2022	Beijing, China	26	—	—	—	—
2026	(Italy) Milano Cortina	15	—	16	—	—

=== World Championships ===
Year	Host	500 m	1000 m	1500 m	Allround	Relay	Mixed relay
2018	Montreal, Canada	25	26	32	26	—	—N/a
2019	Sofia, Bulgaria	39	26	38	36	—	—N/a
2021	Dordrecht, Netherlands	PEN	PEN	29	44	—	—N/a
2022	Montréal, Canada	10	29	PEN	27	—	—N/a
2023	Seoul, South Korea	24	28	31	—N/a	—	–
2024	Rotterdam, Netherlands	54	22	15	—N/a	—	–
2025	Beijing, China	52	30	56	—N/a	—	11
2026	Montréal, Canada	24	38	34	—N/a	—	–

=== European Championships ===
Year	Host	500 m	1000 m	1500 m	Allround	Relay	Mixed relay
2018	Dresden, Germany	29	31	38	30	9	—N/a
2019	Dordrecht, Netherlands	21	33	PEN	35	10	—N/a
2020	Debrecen, Hungary	PEN	17	19	24	7	—N/a
2021	Gdańsk, Poland	PEN	27	PEN	44	—	—N/a
2023	Gdańsk, Poland	12	17	23	—N/a	8	10
2024	Gdańsk, Poland	8	23	38	—N/a	10	8
2025	Dresden, Germany	PEN	27	30	—N/a	—	7
2026	Tilburg, Netherlands	14	28	25	—N/a	10	7

== Personal life ==
His two-year-older brother, Volodymyr, is also a short track speed skater who represented Ukraine at both World and European championships. Oleh and Volodymyr took up short track speed skating almost together in 2009.

Handei is a student at the National University of Physical Education and Sport of Ukraine and studies physical culture.

== See also ==
- Vladyslav Heraskevych, Ukrainian skeleton racer and 2026 Olympian, who was disqualified for wearing a helmet with images of athletes killed in the war
- Kateryna Kotsar, Ukrainian freestyle skier and 2026 Olympian, who had to change her helmet with a pro-Ukrainian phrase
