= Short-track speed skating at the 2024 Winter Youth Olympics – Women's 1500 metres =

Women's 1500 metres at the IV Winter Youth Olympic Games
- Venue: Gangneung Ice Arena
- Dates: 20 January
- Competitors: 35 from 22 nations
- Winning time: 2:33.148

Medalists
1st place, gold medalist(s)		Yang Jingru	China
2nd place, silver medalist(s)		Li Jinzi	China
3rd place, bronze medalist(s)		Nonomi Inoue	Japan

The women's 1500 metres competition in short track speed skating at the 2024 Winter Youth Olympics was held on 20 January, at the Gangneung Ice Arena in Gangneung.

== Results ==
=== Quarterfinals ===
Q – qualified for the semifinals

Rank	Heat	Name	Country	Time	Notes
1	1	Aoi Yoshizawa	Japan	2:28.337	Q
2	1	Courtney Charlong	Canada	2:28.428	Q
3	1	Océane Guerard	Canada	2:28.482	Q
4	1	Eliza Rhodehamel	United States	2:28.560	q
5	1	Maiwenn Langevin	France	2:35.484	
6	1	Madara Gintere	Latvia	2:46.802	
1	2	Diána Laura Végi	Hungary	2:33.577	Q
2	2	Anna Falkowska	Poland	2:33.821	Q
3	2	Polina Omelchuk	Kazakhstan	2:33.959	Q
4	2	Diana Demochko	Ukraine	2:41.971	q
5	2	Kamilla Salmiņa	Latvia	3:03.054	
	2	Birgit Radt	Netherlands		PEN
1	3	Chung Jae-hee	South Korea	2:22.608	Q
2	3	Angel Daleman	Netherlands	2:24.088	Q
3	3	Punpreeda Prempreecha	Thailand	2:27.267	Q
4	3	Sara Martinelli	Italy	2:27.789	q
5	3	Kornelia Woźniak	Poland	2:28.759	
6	3	Chan Sin Ying	Hong Kong	No time	
1	4	Nonomi Inoue	Japan	2:38.688	Q
2	4	Anastassiya Astrakhantseva	Kazakhstan	2:38.781	Q
3	4	Lea Popovičová	Slovakia	2:42.482	Q
4	4	Sara Merazzi	Italy	2:42.755	
5	4	Veronika Kremer	Ukraine	2:44.426	
6	4	Valentina Levickytė	Lithuania	2:48.487	
1	5	Paula Torzewski-Kuhnt	Germany	2:38.374	Q
2	5	Dóra Szigeti	Hungary	2:38.540	Q
3	5	Kyung Eun Jang	United States	2:38.672	Q
4	5	Michaela Ižarová	Slovakia	2:42.115	
5	5	Sonya Stoyanova	Bulgaria	2:42.443	
6	5	Amelia Chua	Singapore	2:42.567	
1	6	Kang Min-ji	South Korea	2:40.028	Q
2	6	Li Jinzi	China	2:40.035	Q
3	6	Yang Jingru	China	2:40.098	Q
4	6	Eva Bláhová	Czech Republic	2:45.156	
5	6	Dina Špan	Slovenia	2:48.096	

=== Semifinals ===
QA – qualified for Final A
QB – qualified for Final B
ADVA – advanced to Final A
ADVB – advanced to Final B

Rank	Heat	Name	Country	Time	Notes
1	1	Yang Jingru	China	2:25.980	QA
2	1	Nonomi Inoue	Japan	2:26.311	QA
3	1	Anastassiya Astrakhantseva	Kazakhstan	2:26.914	QB
4	1	Aoi Yoshizawa	Japan	2:27.287	QB
5	1	Eliza Rhodehamel	United States	2:28.955	
6	1	Courtney Charlong	Canada	3:05.219	ADVB
7	1	Océane Guerard	Canada	PEN	
1	2	Diána Laura Végi	Hungary	2:25.683	QA
2	2	Polina Omelchuk	Kazakhstan	2:26.749	QA
3	2	Paula Torzewski-Kuhnt	Germany	2:27.391	QB
4	2	Kyung Eun Jang	United States	2:33.880	QB
5	2	Diana Demochko	Ukraine	2:41.167	
6	2	Dóra Szigeti	Hungary	3:12.408	ADVA
7	2	Anna Falkowska	Poland	PEN	
1	3	Chung Jae-hee	South Korea	2:26.762	QA
2	3	Li Jinzi	China	2:27.079	QA
3	3	Angel Daleman	Netherlands	2:27.134	QB
4	3	Kang Min-ji	South Korea	2:27.378	QB
5	3	Lea Popovičová	Slovakia	2:33.281	
6	3	Punpreeda Prempreecha	Thailand	2:33.336	
7	3	Sara Martinelli	Italy	2:34.007	

=== Final B ===
Rank	Name	Country	Time	Notes
8	Kang Min-ji	South Korea	2:42.962	
9	Paula Torzewski-Kuhnt	Germany	2:44.645	
10	Aoi Yoshizawa	Japan	2:44.661	
11	Courtney Charlong	Canada	2:44.733	
12	Kyung Eun Jang	United States	2:46.518	
13	Anastassiya Astrakhantseva	Kazakhstan	2:46.816	
14	Angel Daleman	Netherlands	3:12.937	

=== Final A ===
Rank	Name	Country	Time	Notes
1st place, gold medalist(s)	Yang Jingru	China	2:33.148	
2nd place, silver medalist(s)	Li Jinzi	China	2:41.543	
3rd place, bronze medalist(s)	Nonomi Inoue	Japan	2:42.293	
4	Diána Laura Végi	Hungary	2:42.818	
5	Dóra Szigeti	Hungary	2:42.954	
6	Polina Omelchuk	Kazakhstan	2:43.162	
7	Chung Jae-hee	South Korea	2:54.809	
