= Zhang Bohao =

Chinese speed skater (born 2006)

Personal information
- Born: 20 October 2006 (age 20)

Sport
- Country: China
- Sport: Short track speed skating
Medal record
Men's short-track speed skating
Representing China
World Championships
Silver medal – second place	2026 Montreal	5000 m relay
Winter Youth Olympics
Gold medal – first place	2024 Gangwon	Mixed relay
World Junior Championships
Gold medal – first place	2024 Gdansk	2000 m mixed relay
Silver medal – second place	2024 Gdansk	3000 m relay
Silver medal – second place	2025 Calgary	2000 m mixed relay
Silver medal – second place	2025 Calgary	3000 m relay

Zhang Bohao (Chinese: 张柏浩; born 20 October 2006) is a Chinese short track speed skater.

== Career ==
Zhang competed in the 2024 Winter Youth Olympics, where he finished fourth in the 500 meters and fifth in both the 1,000 and 1,500 meters. In the mixed relay, he won the competition with Li Jinzi, Yang Jingru, and Zhang Xinzhe. That same year, at the World Junior Championships, he finished sixth in the 500 meters and seventh in the 1,500 meters, won a gold medal in the 2000 m mixed relay and a silver medal in the 3000 m relay. At the 2025 Junior World Championships in Calgary, he won two silver medals.

During the 2025–26 ISU Short Track World Tour, Zhang's best result was fifteenth place in the 1,500 meters. He competed in the men's 5000 metre relay event at the 2026 Winter Olympics. In March 2026, at the World Championships in Montreal, Zhang won a silver medal as part of the Chinese men's relay team.
