= Short-track speed skating at the 2024 Winter Youth Olympics – Mixed team relay =

Mixed Relay at the IV Winter Youth Olympic Games
- Venue: Gangneung Ice Arena
- Dates: 24 January
- Competitors: 32 from 8 nations
- Winning time: 2:46.156

Medalists
1st place, gold medalist(s)		Li Jinzi; Yang Jingru; Zhang Bohao; Zhang Xinzhe	China
2nd place, silver medalist(s)		Kyung Eun Jang; Eliza Rhodehamel; Julius Kazanecki; Sean Shuai	United States
3rd place, bronze medalist(s)		Nonomi Inoue; Aoi Yoshizawa; Yuta Fuchigami; Raito Kida	Japan

The mixed relay competition in short track speed skating at the 2024 Winter Youth Olympics was held on 24 January, at the Gangneung Ice Arena in Gangneung.

== Results ==
=== Semifinals ===
QA – qualified for Final A
QB – qualified for Final B

Rank	Heat	Country	Name	Time	Notes
1	1	Japan	Nonomi Inoue; Aoi Yoshizawa; Yuta Fuchigami; Raito Kida	2:46.957	QA
2	1	United States	Kyung Eun Jang; Eliza Rhodehamel; Julius Kazanecki; Sean Shuai	2:51.078	QA
3	1	Netherlands	Angel Daleman; Birgit Radt; Jonas de Jong; Nick Endeveld	2:58.684	QB
4	1	South Korea	Chung Jae-hee; Kang Min-ji; Joo Jae-hee; Kim You-sung	3:14.302	QB
1	2	China	Li Jinzi; Yang Jingru; Zhang Bohao; Zhang Xinzhe	2:46.403	QA
2	2	Canada	Courtney Charlong; Océane Guerard; Victor Chartrand; Alexis Dubuc-Bilodeau	2:47.966	QA
3	2	Hungary	Dóra Szigeti; Diána Laura Végi; Dávid Keszthelyi; Dominik Major	2:58.201	QB
	2	Kazakhstan	Anastassiya Astrakhantseva; Polina Omelchuk; Yerassyl Shynggyskhan; Meiirzhan Tolegen	PEN	

=== Final B ===
Rank	Country	Name	Time	Notes
5	South Korea	Chung Jae-hee; Kang Min-ji; Joo Jae-hee; Kim You-sung	2:45.830	
6	Netherlands	Angel Daleman; Birgit Radt; Jonas de Jong; Nick Endeveld	2:47.593	
7	Hungary	Dóra Szigeti; Diána Laura Végi; Dávid Keszthelyi; Dominik Major	2:54.403	

=== Final A ===
Rank	Country	Name	Time	Notes
1st place, gold medalist(s)	China	Li Jinzi; Yang Jingru; Zhang Bohao; Zhang Xinzhe	2:46.516	
2nd place, silver medalist(s)	United States	Kyung Eun Jang; Eliza Rhodehamel; Julius Kazanecki; Sean Shuai	2:47.124	
3rd place, bronze medalist(s)	Japan	Nonomi Inoue; Aoi Yoshizawa; Yuta Fuchigami; Raito Kida	2:47.412	
4	Canada	Courtney Charlong; Océane Guerard; Victor Chartrand; Alexis Dubuc-Bilodeau	3:00.867	
