= 2022–23 Biathlon World Cup – Mixed Relay =

The 2022–23 Biathlon World Cup – Mixed Relay started on 8 January 2023 in Pokljuka and will conclude on 5 March 2023 in Nové Město.

== Competition format ==
The relay teams consist of four biathletes. Legs 1 and 2 are skied by either the two men or the two women; legs 3 and 4 are skied by the remaining athletes. The race consists of either four 6 kilometres (3.7 mi) legs or four 7.5 kilometres (4.7 mi) legs. Every athlete's leg is skied over three laps, with two shooting rounds: one prone and one standing. For every round of five targets there are eight bullets available, though the last three can only be single-loaded manually from the spare round holders or from bullets deposited by the athlete into trays or onto the mat at the firing line. If after eight bullets there are still standing targets, one 150 metres (490 ft) penalty loop must be taken for each remaining target. The first-leg participants all start at the same time, and as in cross-country skiing relays, every athlete of a team must touch the team's next-leg participant to perform a valid changeover. On the first shooting stage of the first leg, the participant must shoot in the lane corresponding to their bib number (bib #10 shoots at lane #10 regardless of their position in the race), then for the remainder of the relay, the athletes shoot at the lane corresponding to the position they arrived (arrive at the range in 5th place, shoot at lane five).

The single mixed relay involves one male and one female biathlete each completing two legs consisting of one prone and one standing shoot. The starting biathletes all start the race at the same time and complete one 3 kilometres (1.9 mi) leg before exchanging with their partner who completes another 3 kilometres (1.9 mi) leg. The athlete then exchanges back with their partner who completes another 3 kilometres (1.9 mi) leg before exchanging back and completing a final 4.5 kilometres (2.8 mi) leg, which includes an extra lap after the final shoot. The rules regarding shooting are the same as in the regular mixed relay.

== 2022–23 Top 3 standings ==
Medal	Athlete	Points
Gold:	France	165
Silver:	Norway	130
Bronze:	Switzerland	110

== Events summary ==
Event	Gold	Time	Silver	Time	Bronze	Time
Pokljuka (SR) details	Norway; Vetle Sjåstad Christiansen; Ingrid Landmark Tandrevold	38:54.1 (0+0) (0+2) (0+0) (0+1) (0+0) (0+2) (0+0) (0+0)	France; Antonin Guigonnat; Lou Jeanmonnot	39:35.1 (0+1) (0+2) (0+1) (0+0) (0+0) (0+1) (0+0) (0+1)	Switzerland; Niklas Hartweg; Amy Baserga	39:43.7 (0+2) (0+1) (0+1) (0+1) (0+0) (0+3) (0+0) (0+0)
Pokljuka (MR) details	France; Fabien Claude; Quentin Fillon Maillet; Anaïs Chevalier-Bouchet; Julia Simon	1:19:48.9 (0+1) (0+0) (1+3) (0+1) (0+1) (0+0) (0+0) (0+1)	Italy; Didier Bionaz; Tommaso Giacomel; Dorothea Wierer; Lisa Vittozzi	1:20:13.5 (0+1) (0+1) (0+0) (0+2) (0+2) (0+0) (0+0) (0+1)	Sweden; Jesper Nelin; Martin Ponsiluoma; Mona Brorsson; Elvira Öberg	1:20:36.1 (0+0) (0+0) (1+3) (0+1) (0+0) (0+1) (0+0) (0+0)
Nové Město (MR) details	France; Lou Jeanmonnot; Caroline Colombo; Éric Perrot; Fabien Claude	1:06:32.3 (0+0) (0+0) (0+3) (0+1) (0+3) (0+0) (0+0) (0+0)	Sweden; Anna Magnusson; Hanna Öberg; Martin Ponsiluoma; Sebastian Samuelsson	1:07:05.9 (0+0) (0+3) (0+3) (0+2) (0+3) (0+3) (0+2) (0+2)	Norway; Karoline Offigstad Knotten; Ingrid Landmark Tandrevold; Johannes Dale; Endre Strømsheim	1:07:10.6 (0+1) (0+2) (0+1) (0+3) (0+3) (0+3) (0+3) (0+0)
Nové Město (SR) details	Norway; Marte Olsbu Røiseland; Vetle Sjåstad Christiansen	36:40.5 (0+2) (0+0) (0+2) (0+2) (0+0) (0+1) (0+0) (0+0)	Switzerland; Amy Baserga; Niklas Hartweg	36:58.1 (0+0) (0+2) (0+1) (0+2) (0+1) (0+3) (0+1) (0+0)	Latvia; Baiba Bendika; Andrejs Rastorgujevs	37:10.0 (0+0) (0+1) (0+0) (0+1) (0+2) (0+3) (0+0) (0+2)

== Standings ==
Final standings after 4 competitions.

#	Name	POK SR	POK MR	NOV MR	NOV SR	Total
1.	France	75	90	90	50	305
2.	Norway	90	40	60	90	280
3.	Switzerland	60	50	32	75	217
4.	Sweden	31	60	75	32	198
5.	Italy	30	75	45	23	173
6.	Germany	28	45	50	36	159
7.	Austria	45	32	34	45	156
8.	Ukraine	36	30	40	40	146
9.	Finland	50	26	31	30	137
10.	Czech Republic	26	36	36	29	127
11.	United States	40	28	23	25	116
12.	Poland	29	34	26	24	113
13.	Slovenia	27	29	29	26	111
14.	Romania	25	19	25	31	100
15.	Slovakia	22	27	27	20	96
16.	Estonia	23	24	30	17	94
17.	Japan	34	–	22	27	83
18.	South Korea	24	22	21	16	83
19.	Lithuania	20	21	24	18	83
20.	Kazakhstan	21	17	20	21	79
21.	Latvia	DNS	18	–	60	78
22.	Moldova	32	23	DNS	22	77
23.	Canada	18	20	–	34	72
24.	Bulgaria	19	25	28	–	72
25.	Belgium	–	31	–	28	59
26.	China	–	–	19	19	38
27.	Croatia	17	–	–	–	17
