= 2025 World Junior Short Track Speed Skating Championships =

International speed skating competition

ISU World Junior Short Track Speed Skating Championships 2025
- Venue: Olympic Oval, Calgary, Canada
- Dates: 27 February - 2 March 2025

The 2025 World Junior Short Track Speed Skating Championships took place from 27 February to 2 March 2025 at the Olympic Oval in Calgary, Canada. South Korea dominated the championship, winning 7 gold medals. Mathieu Pelletier and Qi Miao from Canada won the 500 metre events.

== Medal summary ==
=== Medal table ===
* Host nation (Canada)

Rank	Nation	Gold	Silver	Bronze	Total
1	South Korea	7	3	1	11
2	Canada	2	0	2	4
3	China	0	4	2	6
4	Kazakhstan	0	1	3	4
5	Japan	0	1	1	2
Totals (5 entries)		9	9	9	27

=== Medalists ===
==== Men ====
Event	Gold		Silver		Bronze	
500 metres	Mathieu Pelletier; Canada	41.647	Li Xinyu; China	41.869	Kim Min-woo; South Korea	50.312
1000 metres	Rim Jong-un; South Korea	1:24.450	Zhang Bohao; China	1:24.657	Victor Chartrand; Canada	1:26.147
1500 metres	Rim Jong-un; South Korea	2:18.477	Kim Min-woo; South Korea	2:19.057	Sun Xiao; China	2:19.178
3000 metres relay	South Korea; Joo Jae-hee; Kim Min-woo; Rim Jong-un; Koo Min-seung	3:59.645	China; Li Xinyu; Lyu Yanpeng; Zhang Bohao; Sun Xiao; Tian Minshuo	3:59.690	Kazakhstan; Nurłan Kajyrbekow; Dynmuchamed Täżybaj; Maksat Uäliułła; Bogdan Wiechow	3:59.798

==== Women ====
Event	Gold		Silver		Bronze	
500 metres	Ayisha Miao Qi; Canada	43.390	Ayano Sekiguchi; Japan	43.509	Lü Wanyu; China	44.168
1000 metres	Kim Min-ji; South Korea	1:33.123	Oh Song-mi; South Korea	1:33.401	Alina Ażgalijewa; Kazakhstan	1:33.435
1500 metres	Oh Song-mi; South Korea	2:28.128	Kim Min-ji; South Korea	2:28.215	Ayisha Miao Qi; Canada	2:28.270
3000 metres relay	South Korea; Chung Jae-hee; Kang Min-ji; Kim Min-ji; Oh Song-mi	4:13.083	Kazakhstan; Alina Ażgalijewa; Anastasija Galeczina; Zejnep Kumarkan; Polina Omielczuk	4:13.651	Japan; Nonomi Inoue; Sarasa Kinami; Ayano Sekiguchi; Aoi Yoshizawa	4:13.771

==== Mixed ====
Event	Gold		Silver		Bronze	
2000 metre relay	South Korea; Kim Min-ji; Kim Min-woo; Oh Song-mi; Rim Jong-un; Joo Jae-hee; Kang Min-ji	2:41.178	China; Li Xinyu; Lin Jingyi; Zhang Bohao; Lü Wanyu; Tian Minshuo	2:41.438	Kazakhstan; Alina Ażgalijewa; Zejnep Kumarkan; Dynmuchamed Täżyba; Bogdan Wiechow; Anastasija Galeczina; Nurłan Kajyrbekow	2:44.071
