= Hong Kong at the 2024 Winter Youth Olympics =

- Flag of Hong Kong
- IOC code: HKG
- NOC: Hong Kong Olympic Committee

in Gangwon, South Korea 19 January 2024 – 1 February 2024
- Competitors: 3 in 2 sports
- Flag bearers (opening): Lucas Wong & Chan Sin Ying
- Flag bearer (closing): TBD
- Medals: Gold 0 Silver 0 Bronze 0 Total 0

Winter Youth Olympics appearances (overview)
- 2020; 2024

Hong Kong competed at the 2024 Winter Youth Olympics in Gangwon, South Korea, from January 19 to February 1, 2024, This was Hong Kong's second appearance at the Winter Youth Olympic Games, having debuted at the last edition in 2020.

The Hong Kong team consisted of three athletes (two men and one woman) competing in two sports. Alpine skier Lucas Wong and short track speed skater Chan Sin Ying were the country's flagbearers during the opening ceremony.

== Competitors ==
The following is the list of number of competitors (per gender) participating at the games per sport/discipline.

Sport	Men	Women	Total
Alpine skiing	1	1	2
Short track speed skating	0	1	1
Total	2	1	3

== Alpine skiing ==
Hong Kong qualified two alpine skiers (one per gender).

Athlete	Event	Run 1		Run 2		Total	
Athlete	Event	Time	Rank	Time	Rank	Time	Rank
Lucas Wong	Men's giant slalom	1:00.43	58	56.72	45	1:57.15	43
Lucas Wong	Men's slalom	57.11	54	1:03.56	36	2:00.67	36
Aerin Alexandra King	Women's giant slalom	1:00.92	47	DNF			
Aerin Alexandra King	Women's slalom	1:08.38	58	1:03.67	42	2:12.05	42

== Short track speed skating ==
Hong Kong qualified one female short track speed skater. This marked Hong Kong's sport debut at the Winter Youth Olympics.

Athlete	Event	Heats		Quarterfinal		Semifinal		Final	
Athlete	Event	Time	Rank	Time	Rank	Time	Rank	Time	Rank
Chan Sin Ying	500 m	1:00.292	4	Did not advance					
Chan Sin Ying	1000 m	2:00.656	4	Did not advance					
Chan Sin Ying	1500 m	—N/a		No Time		Did not advance			

- Results are within the heat.

== See also ==
- Hong Kong at the 2024 Summer Olympics
