= 2024 World Junior Short Track Speed Skating Championships =

International speed skating competition

ISU World Junior Short Track Speed Skating Championships 2024
- Venue: Hala Olivia, Gdańsk, Poland
- Dates: 22–25 February

The 2024 World Junior Short Track Speed Skating Championships took place from 22 to 25 February 2024 at the Hala Olivia in Gdańsk, Poland.

== Medal summary ==
=== Medal table ===
* Host nation (Poland)

Rank	Nation	Gold	Silver	Bronze	Total
1	South Korea	4	4	2	10
2	China	3	1	1	5
3	Hungary	2	0	0	2
4	Italy	0	2	0	2
5	Kazakhstan	0	1	0	1
5	United States	0	1	0	1
7	Canada	0	0	3	3
8	Japan	0	0	1	1
8	Netherlands	0	0	1	1
8	Poland*	0	0	1	1
Totals (10 entries)		9	9	9	27

=== Medalists ===
==== Men ====
Event	Gold		Silver		Bronze	
500 metres	Shin Dong-min; South Korea	42.122	Sean Shuai; United States	42.174	Rim Jong-un; South Korea	42.407
1000 metres	Shin Dong-min; South Korea	1:26.490	Rim Jong-un; South Korea	1:26.596	Han Byeong-chan; South Korea	1:26.999
1500 metres	Rim Jong-un; South Korea	2:20.640	Lorenzo Previtali; Italy	2:21.312	Gabriel Jones; Canada	2:21.439
3000 metres relay	South Korea; Han Byeong-chan; Kim Min-woo; Rim Jong-un; Shin Dong-min	4:03.893	China; Li Kun; Lyu Yanpeng; Zhang Bohao; Zhang Tianyi	4:04.009	Japan; Yuta Fuchigami; Raito Kida; Teruhisa Miyoshi; Shomu Sasaki	4:04.871

==== Women ====
Event	Gold		Silver		Bronze	
500 metres	Wang Ye; China	43.921	Chung Jae-hee; South Korea	44.292	Victoria Jean-Baptiste; Canada	44.824
1000 metres	Wang Ye; China	1:50.684	Yu Su-min; South Korea	1:50.792	Angel Daleman; Netherlands	DNF
1500 metres	Maja Somodi; Hungary	2:48.391	Alina Azhgaliyeva; Kazakhstan	2:48.478	Lyu Wanyu; China	2:48.481
3000 metres relay	Hungary; Melinda Schönborn; Maja Somodi; Dóra Szigeti; Diána Laura Végi	4:27.839	Italy; Margherita Betti; Federica Cola; Sara Martinelli; Viola Simonini	4:29.189	Poland; Natalia Bielicka; Anna Falkowska; Michalina Wawer; Kornelia Woźniak	4:42.373

==== Mixed ====
Event	Gold		Silver		Bronze	
2000 metre relay	China; Li Kun; Song Jiarui; Wang Ye; Zhang Bohao; Zhang Jianing; Zhang Tianyi	2:44.239	South Korea; Chung Jae-hee; Han Byeong-chan; Rim Jong-un; Yu Su-min; Kim Min-woo; Oh Song-mi	2:44.326	Canada; Victoria Jean-Baptiste; Gabriel Jones; Ayisha Miao Qi; Mathieu Pelletier; Courtney Charlong; Adam Law	PEN
