= Wang Ye (speed skater) =

Chinese speed skater (born 2005)

Personal information
- Born: 29 August 2005 (age 20) Beijing, China

Sport
- Country: China
- Sport: Short track speed skating
Medal record
Women's short-track speed skating
Representing China
World Championships
Gold medal – first place	2024 Rotterdam	2000 m mixed relay
Bronze medal – third place	2026 Montreal	3000 m relay
World Junior Championships
Gold medal – first place	2024 Gdansk	500 m
Gold medal – first place	2024 Gdansk	1000 m
Gold medal – first place	2024 Gdansk	2000 m mixed relay
Silver medal – second place	2023 Dresden	3000 m relay

Wang Ye (Chinese: 王晔; pinyin: Wáng Yè; born 29 August 2005) is a Chinese short track speed skater. She is a world champion and three-time world junior champion. She competes for Team Beijing.

== Early life ==
Wang Ye was born in the Haidian district of Beijing. At the age of 2, her parents bought her a pair of roller skates so she could practice the sport. She began skating at age 4. In addition to roller skating and ice skating, Wang also studied piano, dance, drawing, singing, skiing, swimming, and more as a child. At the time of her passion for speed skating, there was no indoor rink suitable for short track speed skating in Beijing, so she trained in the frozen ditches of local rivers. In sixth grade, at the age of 11, Wang chose between skating and piano.

== Career ==
In 2017, Wang was selected for the short track speed skating team and competed in the National Youth League. In the 2017–2018 season, she won 12 medals, including seven gold. She trained in Qingdao, Changchun, and other places, and her mother, Wang Lihua, was always by her side. In 2018, Wang served as an alternate at the Beijing Winter Olympics due to her young age. In April 2018, Wang was selected for the National Junior Short Track Speed Skating Team "Genius" and began her professional training at the Beijing Normal University Affiliated Middle School.

In November of that year, Wang won the relay, 500m, 1000m, 1500m, and overall all-around titles among juniors at the Beijing Winter Games. In 2019, she was selected for the National Junior Short Track Speed Skating Team, becoming the youngest athlete on the Chinese team. In August, at the Second National Youth Games, she took first place in the 500m, 1500m, and women's relay. In July 2020, Wang Ye injured both knees during training and spent over a year in rehabilitation.

In September 2022, Wang was selected for the national team and in November went to the World Cup stage in Montreal, but was unable to participate due to a cold. In January 2023, at her debut at the World Junior Championships in Dresden, she won silver in the women's relay. In April 2023, she won the 500-meter race at the Chinese National Championships, and also won gold in the mixed relay and bronze in the women's relay. In October, at the World Cup stage in Montreal, as part of the team, Wang won two mixed relays, and in December, she finished in third place in the 500-meter race at the Beijing and Seoul stages.

In January, at the 14th Chinese Winter Games, as part of the Jilin team, Wang won gold in the mixed relay and the 500-meter race. On 11 February 2024, she took second place in the 500 meters at the Dresden event, setting a new Chinese record with a time of 42.378 seconds. At the end of the month, at the World Junior Championships in Gdansk, she won gold medals in the 500 meters, 1000 meters, and mixed relay.[9] In March, at the World Championships in Rotterdam, Wang won gold in the mixed relay, taking sixth place in the 500 meters and fifth in the women's relay. In September 2024, she became the Chinese national champion in the 500 meters for the second time in a row, and on October 20, she was selected to the national team for the 2024–2025 season.

In November 2024, at the second leg of the ISU Short Track Speed Skating World Tour, Wang Ye was part of the Chinese women's team that won a bronze medal in the 3000 m relay with a time of 4:09.376.

On 7 December 2024, during the women's 3000 m relay final at the ISU Short Track Speed Skating World Tour in Beijing, Wang Ye sustained a serious leg injury after a collision with a Polish skater and was taken to hospital for treatment.

In January 2026, Wang Ye made her return to competition at the 2025–26 National Short Track Speed Skating Championships, winning the women's 500 m A-final with a time of 43.778 seconds.

In March 2026, at the World Championships in Montreal, Wang won a bronze medal as part of the Chinese women's relay team.
