= Renārs Birkentāls =

Latvian biathlete (born 2001)

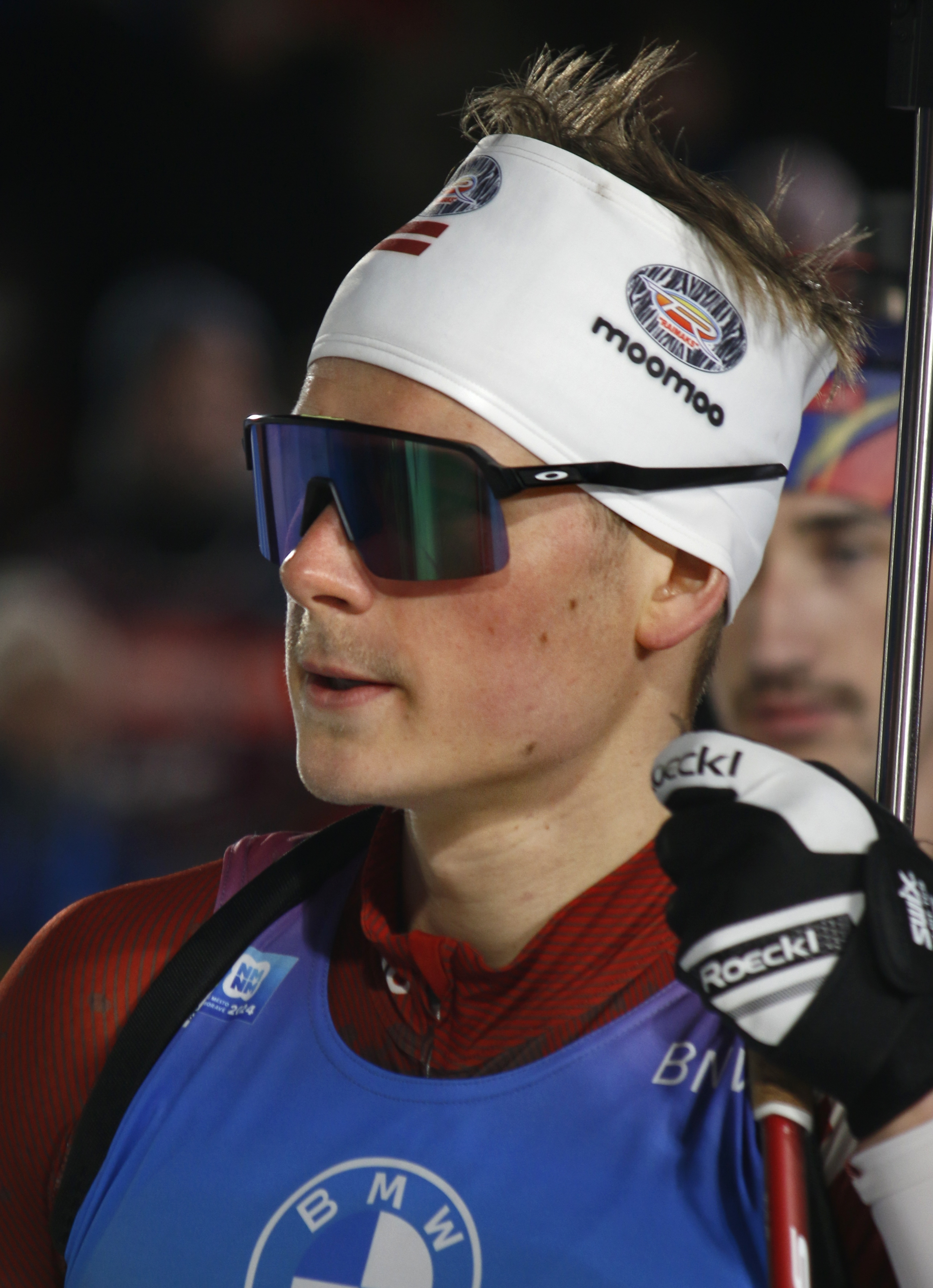
- Birkentāls in 2024

Personal information
- Nationality: Latvian
- Born: 23 May 2001 (age 24) Talsi, Latvia

Sport
- Country: Latvia
- Sport: Biathlon

Renārs Birkentāls (born 23 May 2001) is a Latvian biathlete who has competed in the Biathlon World Cup since 2020. He is participating in the 2026 Olympic Games. Together with his teammates Andrejs Rastorgujevs, Baiba Bendika and Estere Volfa he finished 12th in the mixed relay, which is currently the best Latvian result in history in this discipline.

== Biathlon results ==
All results are sourced from the International Biathlon Union.

=== Olympic Games ===
0 medal

Event	Individual	Sprint	Pursuit	Mass start	Relay	Mixed relay
(Italy) 2026 Milano Cortina	31st	77th	—	—	18th	12th

=== World Championships ===
0 medal

Event	Individual	Sprint	Pursuit	Mass start	Relay	Mixed relay	Single mixed relay
(Czech Republic) 2024 Nove Mesto	68th	70th	—	—	16th	19th	—
(Switzerland) 2025 Lenzerheide	48th	34th	52nd	—	19th	22nd	9th
