= 2026 World Short Track Speed Skating Championships =

Short track speed skating championships

- Venue: Maurice Richard Arena
- Location: Montreal, Canada
- Dates: 13–15 March

The 2026 World Short Track Speed Skating Championships were held from 13 to 15 March 2026 at the Maurice Richard Arena in Montreal, Canada.

== Schedule ==
The Championships consisted of nine events: three individual events for men and women and three team events.

		Fri 13	Sat 14	Sun 15
Men	500 m	H	R, QF, SF, F	
Men	1000 m	H		R, QF, SF, F
Men	1500 m	QF	R, SF, F	
Men	5000 m relay	QF	SF	F
Women	500 m	H		R, QF, SF, F
Women	1000 m	H	R, QF, SF, F	
Women	1500 m	QF		R, SF, F
Women	3000 m relay		SF, F	
Mixed	2000 m relay	QF	SF	F

== Medal summary ==
=== Medal table ===
* Host nation (Canada)

Rank	Nation	Gold	Silver	Bronze	Total
1	South Korea	4	0	0	4
2	Netherlands	2	5	0	7
3	Canada*	2	1	0	3
4	Italy	1	2	3	6
5	China	0	1	1	2
6	Belgium	0	0	2	2
7	Great Britain	0	0	1	1
7	Turkey	0	0	1	1
7	United States	0	0	1	1
Totals (9 entries)		9	9	9	27

=== Men ===
Event	Gold		Silver		Bronze	
500 m	Steven Dubois; Canada	40.153	Jens van 't Wout; Netherlands	40.329	Furkan Akar; Turkey	40.641
1000 m	Rim Jong-un; South Korea	1:25.805	Jens van 't Wout; Netherlands	1:26.315	Niall Treacy; Great Britain	1:26.660
1500 m	Rim Jong-un; South Korea	2:14.974	Thomas Nadalini; Italy	2:15.218	Stijn Desmet; Belgium	2:15.327
5000 m relay	Canada; Maxime Laoun; William Dandjinou; Félix Roussel; Steven Dubois; Jordan Pierre-Gilles	6:56.578	China; Zhang Bohao; Li Kun; Zhu Yiding; Li Yuheng; Song Guixu	6:58.309	Italy; Pietro Sighel; Luca Spechenhauser; Lorenzo Previtali; Thomas Nadalini	7.36.693

=== Women ===
Event	Gold		Silver		Bronze	
500 m	Xandra Velzeboer; Netherlands	41.761	Selma Poutsma; Netherlands	42.026	Chiara Betti; Italy	42.228
1000 m	Kim Gil-li; South Korea	1:28.843	Xandra Velzeboer; Netherlands	1:28.852	Elisa Confortola; Italy	1:28.920
1500 m	Kim Gil-li; South Korea	2:31.003	Xandra Velzeboer; Netherlands	2:31.298	Corinne Stoddard; United States	2:31.386
3000 m relay	Netherlands; Zoë Deltrap; Michelle Velzeboer; Xandra Velzeboer; Selma Poutsma; Diede van Oorschot	4:10.519	Italy; Elisa Confortola; Arianna Sighel; Chiara Betti; Gloria Ioriatti; Margherita Betti	4:10.570	China; Wang Xinran; Gong Li; Zhang Chutong; Wang Ye; Yang Jinru	4:11.185

=== Mixed ===
Event	Gold		Silver		Bronze	
2000 m relay	Italy; Elisa Confortola; Pietro Sighel; Chiara Betti; Thomas Nadalini; Luca Spechenhauser; Arianna Sighel	2:39.275	Canada; Florence Brunelle; Danaé Blais; William Dandjinou; Steven Dubois; Courtney Sarault; Félix Roussel	2:39.405	Belgium; Stijn Desmet; Hanne Desmet; Ward Pétré; Tineke den Dulk; Adriaan Dewagtere	2:40.184

== Participating nations ==
The final entry list contains 38 participating nations and more than 200 participants, including substitutes:

- Australia (3)
- Austria (2)
- Belgium (11)
- Bosnia and Herzegovina (1)
- Brazil (1)
- Bulgaria (4)
- Canada (12)
- China (11)
- Croatia (3)
- Czech Republic (3)
- France (7)
- Great Britain (6)
- Germany (3)
- Hong Kong (2)
- Hungary (15)
- India (1)
- Ireland (1)
- Italy (16)
- Japan (16)
- Kazakhstan (9)
- South Korea (16)
- Latvia (4)
- Lithuania (1)
- Luxembourg (1)
- Netherlands (19)
- Norway (3)
- New Zealand (1)
- Philippines (1)
- Poland (9)
- Singapore (1)
- Slovenia (1)
- Serbia (1)
- Switzerland (1)
- Slovakia (3)
- Thailand (2)
- Turkey (2)
- Ukraine (6)
- United States (13)
