= Luca Spechenhauser =

Italian speed skater (born 2000)

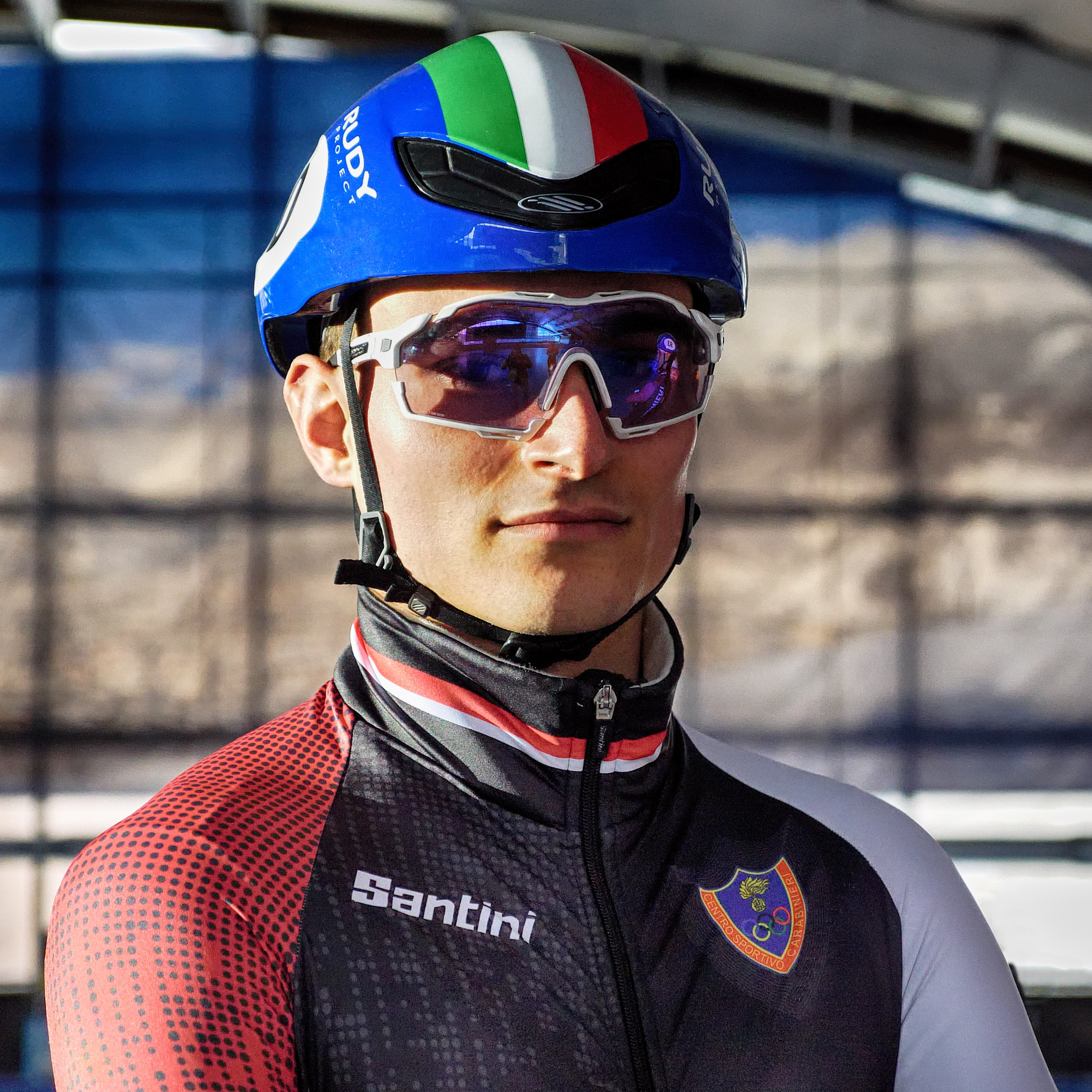

Personal information
- Born: 14 December 2000 (age 25) Bormio, Italy

Sport
- Country: Italy
- Sport: Short track speed skating
- Club: CS Carabinieri
Medal record
Men's short-track speed skating
Representing Italy
Olympic Games
Gold medal – first place	2026 Milano Cortina	Mixed 2000 m relay
Bronze medal – third place	2026 Milano Cortina	5000 m relay
World Championships
Gold medal – first place	2026 Montreal	2000 m mixed relay
Silver medal – second place	2023 Seoul	5000 m relay
Silver medal – second place	2025 Beijing	2000 m mixed relay
Bronze medal – third place	2021 Dordrecht	5000 m relay
Bronze medal – third place	2024 Rotterdam	1000 m
Bronze medal – third place	2026 Montreal	5000 m relay
European Championships
Gold medal – first place	2025 Dresden	5000 m relay
Gold medal – first place	2026 Tilburg	5000 m relay
Silver medal – second place	2021 Gdańsk	5000 m relay
Silver medal – second place	2023 Gdańsk	5000 m relay
Silver medal – second place	2026 Tilburg	1000 m
Bronze medal – third place	2023 Gdańsk	2000 m mixed relay
Bronze medal – third place	2025 Dresden	1000 m

Luca Spechenhauser (born 14 December 2000) is an Italian short track speed skater. He represented Italy at the 2022 and 2026 Winter Olympics.

== Career ==
In January 2026, he represented Italy at the 2026 European Short Track Speed Skating Championships and won a gold medal in the 5000 metre relay and a silver medal in the 1000 metres with a time of 1:24.928.

He was selected to represent Italy at the 2026 Winter Olympics. On 10 February, 2026, he won a gold medal in the mixed 2000 metre relay with a time of 2:36.581. On 14 February, he competed in the 1500 metres and won the B Final with a time of 2:34.359.
