= Rim Jong-un =

South Korean speed skater (born 2007)

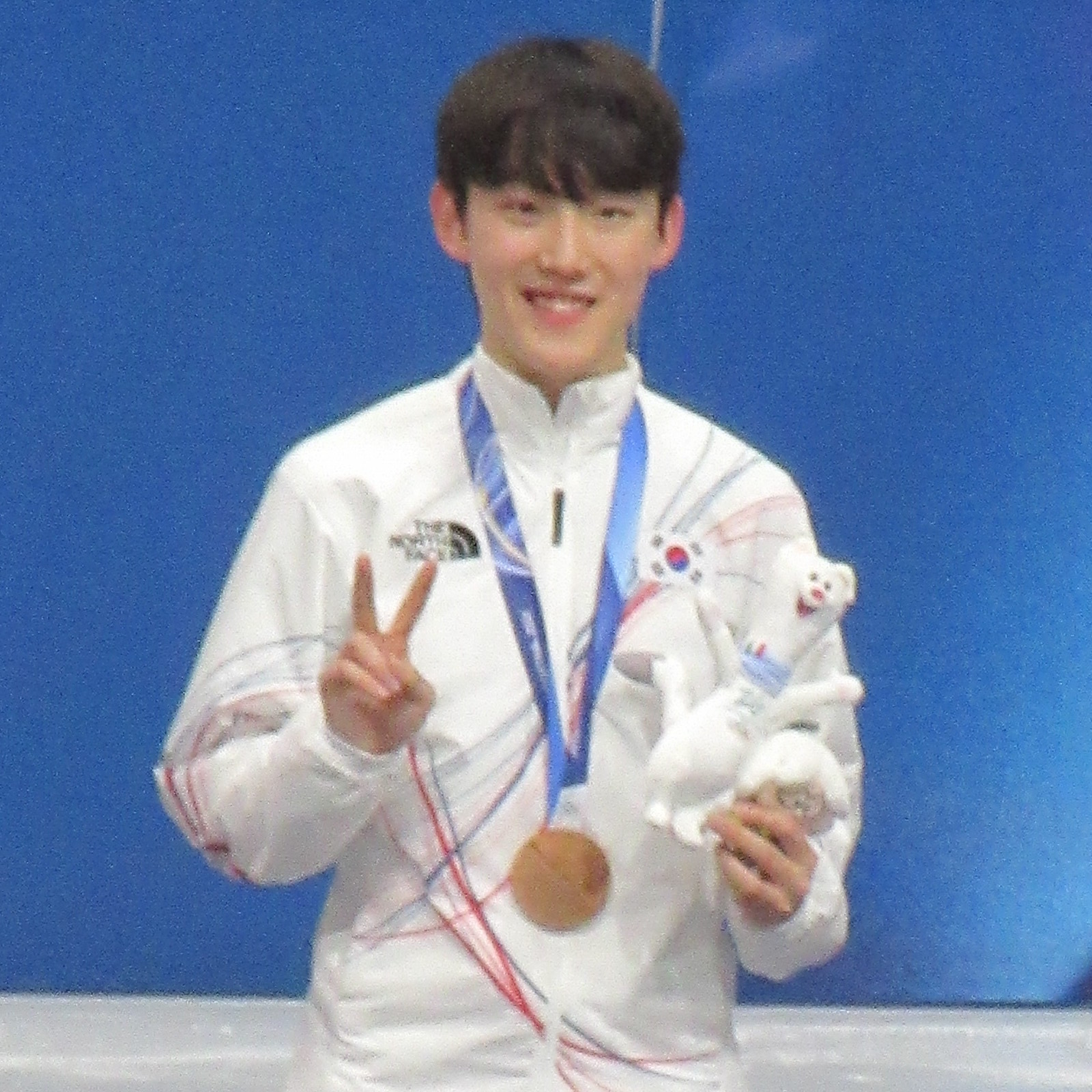
- Rim at the 2026 Winter Olympics

Personal information
- Nationality: South Korean
- Born: 30 October 2007 (age 19) Seoul, South Korea

Sport
- Country: South Korea
- Sport: Short track speed skating
Medal record
Men's short track speed skating
Representing South Korea
Olympic Games
Silver medal – second place	2026 Milano Cortina	5000 m relay
Bronze medal – third place	2026 Milano Cortina	1000 m
World Championships
Gold medal – first place	2026 Montreal	1500 m
Gold medal – first place	2026 Montreal	1000 m
World Junior Championships
Gold medal – first place	2024 Gdansk	1500 m
Gold medal – first place	2024 Gdansk	3000 m relay
Gold medal – first place	2025 Calgary	1500 m
Gold medal – first place	2025 Calgary	1000 m
Gold medal – first place	2025 Calgary	3000 m relay
Gold medal – first place	2025 Calgary	2000 m mixed relay
Silver medal – second place	2024 Gdansk	1000 m
Bronze medal – third place	2024 Gdansk	500 m

Rim Jong-un (Korean: 임종언; born 30 October 2007), is a short-track speed skater from South Korea. He is 2026 World Champion at the 1000 and 1500 meter and individual bronze medalist at the 2026 Winter Olympics.

== Career ==
Rim made his international debut at the 2024 Junior World Championships in Gdaṅsk. He won the 1500 meter event and was part of the winning relay team. He also won two silver medals and one bronze medal. At the 2025 Junior World Championships in Calgary, he won four gold medals.

At the senior level in 2025, Rim secured a spot on the national team by winning the South Korean trials. At the first 2025-26 World Tour event in Montreal, Rim won the 1500 meter race and placed second at the 1000 meter race.

Rim Jong-un obtained a bronze medal at the 1000 meter race of the 2026 Winter Olympics in Milan. At the same Winter Olympics, Rim was part of the Korean team that won the silver medal at the 5000 meter relay event.

At the 2026 World Championships in Montreal, Rim won gold medals at the 1000 and 1500 meter races.
