= Shin Dong-min =

South Korean speed skater (born 2005)

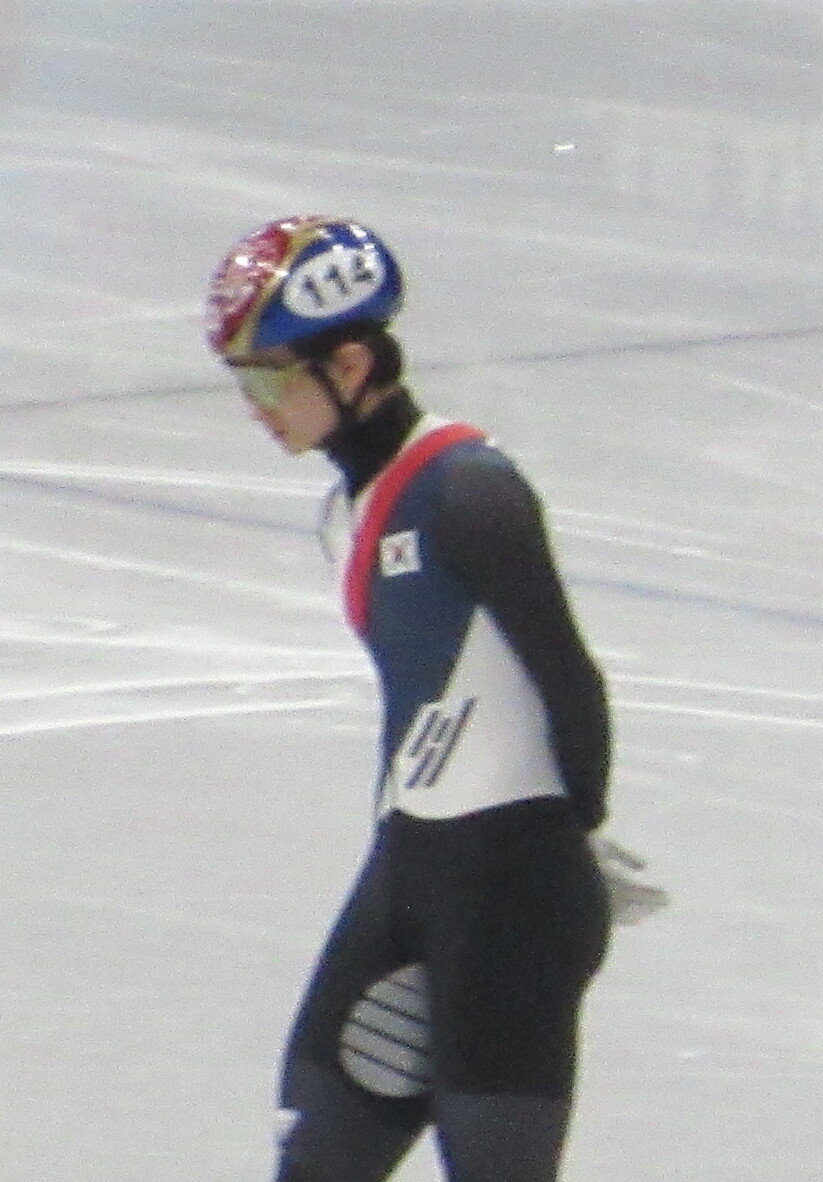
- Shin at the 2026 Winter Olympics

Personal information
- Born: 22 February 2005 (age 21) Seoul, South Korea
- Education: Korea University
- Height: 1.75 m (5 ft 9 in)

Sport
- Country: South Korea
- Sport: Short-track speed skating
- Club: Hwaseong City Hall
Medal record
Men's short-track speed skating
Representing South Korea
Olympic Games
Silver medal – second place	2026 Milano Cortina	5000 m relay
World Junior Championships
Gold medal – first place	2023 Dresden	3000 m relay
Gold medal – first place	2024 Gdansk	500 m
Gold medal – first place	2024 Gdansk	1000 m
Gold medal – first place	2024 Gdansk	3000 m relay
Silver medal – second place	2023 Dresden	1000 m
Silver medal – second place	2023 Dresden	1500 m

Shin Dong-min (Korean: 신동민; born 22 February 2005) is a South Korean short-track speed skater. He represented South Korea at the 2026 Winter Olympics, winning a silver medal in the 5000 m relay.

== Career ==
Shin competed at the 2024 World Junior Short Track Speed Skating Championships and won gold medals in the 500 metres, 1000 metres and 3000 metres relay.

In January 2026, he was selected to represent South Korea at the 2026 Winter Olympics. He competed in the mixed 2000 metre relay and advanced to the B Final, finishing in sixth place. He then competed in the 1000 metres. During the heats, he ranked second in group 5 with a time of 1:24.870 and advanced to the quarterfinals.
