= Maja Somodi =

Hungarian speed skater (born 2004)

Personal information
- Full name: Maja Dóra Somodi
- Born: 15 October 2004 (age 21) Szeged, Hungary
- Height: 1.59 m (5 ft 3 in)

Sport
- Country: Hungary
- Sport: Short-track speed skating
- Club: Szegedi Korcsolyazo Egyesulet
Medal record
Men's short-track speed skating
Representing Hungary
European Championships
Bronze medal – third place	2026 Tilburg	3000 m relay
Bronze medal – third place	2026 Tilburg	2000 m mixed relay
World Junior Championships
Gold medal – first place	2024 Gdańsk	1500 m
Gold medal – first place	2024 Gdańsk	3000 m relay
Bronze medal – third place	2022 Gdańsk	3000 m relay
Bronze medal – third place	2023 Dresden	3000 m relay

Maja Dóra Somodi (born 15 October 2004) is a Hungarian short-track speed skater. She represented Hungary at the 2026 Winter Olympics.

== Career ==
Somodi competed at the 2024 World Junior Short Track Speed Skating Championships and won a gold medal in the 15000 metres and 3000 metres relay.

In January 2026, Nógrádi competed at the 2026 European Short Track Speed Skating Championships and won a bronze medal in the 3000 metre relay and 2000 metre mixed relay events. She was selected to represent Hungary at the 2026 Winter Olympics. On 14 February 2026, she competed in the 1000 metres and was eliminated in the heats.
