= Yang Jingru (speed skater) =

Chinese speed skater (born 2006)

Personal information
- Born: 10 July 2006 (age 19) Qitaihe, Heilongjiang, China

Sport
- Sport: Speed skating
Medal record
Women's short-track speed skating
Representing China
World Championships
Bronze medal – third place	2026 Montreal	3000 m relay
Asian Winter Games
Gold medal – first place	2025 Harbin	3000 m relay
Winter Youth Olympics
Gold medal – first place	2024 Gangwon	1500 m
Gold medal – first place	2024 Gangwon	Mixed relay
Silver medal – second place	2024 Gangwon	1000 m

Yang Jingru (Chinese: 杨婧茹; pinyin: Yáng Jìngrú; born 10 July 2006) is a Chinese speed skater who won the gold medal for short track speed skating at the 2024 Winter Youth Olympics – Women's 1500 metres.

== Early life ==
Born in 2006 in Qitaihe city in Heilongjiang, Yang was raised by her grandmother as her parents worked away from home. She attended Changxing School in Qitaihe where she joined the school's skating team. Both her parents and grandmother were not supportive in her decision to do skating but due to her persistence, they agreed with her decision. She later trained at a short track speed skating school in Qitaihe.

== Sports career ==
On 18 December 2022, at the 3rd Russian–Chinese Winter Youth Games in Changchun, China, the Chinese team consisting of Yang, Sun Yiming, Pang Siyu, Hou Yuming and Wang Jiajing won first place in the women's 3000m short track speed skating relay competition.

Yang won in the U-19 women's 1000m short track speed skating at the National Skating U Series Inter-school League which was held in Hulunbuir, China in February 2023. On 5 March, she won the women's 1500m in the 2022-2023 National Short Track Speed Skating Youth Championship held in Qitaihe. At the 15th Heilongjiang Provincial Games in April 2023, Yang won the gold medal for women's 1000m short track speed skating.

In October 2023, she won the championship in the women's 1500m group A of the China Cup Short Track Speed Skating Elite League Youth Group in Qitaihe. At the 14th Chinese National Winter Games taking place in Hulunbuir in January 2024, Yang won third place at women's 1500m with a time of a time of 2:29.103 and at the women's 3000m at the games, the Heilongjiang team consisting of Yang, Yan Tongyao, Lin Jingyi, Yang Jingru, Wang Kexin and Li Jing, won second place with a time of 4:18.422. In the group A of women's 1500m at the games, she won first place with a time of 1 minute 30.770 seconds.

At the 2024 Winter Youth Olympics in Gangwon, South Korea on 20 January 2024, she won gold medal in the 1500m finals with a time of 2 minutes 33.148 seconds, which was the first gold medal won by a member of the Chinese sports delegation at the 2024 Youth Olympic Games. On 21 January, in the 1000m finals at the games, Yang won silver medal with a time of 1 minute 40.996 seconds. On 24 January, in the final of the mixed 2000m relay at the games, the Chinese team consisting of Yang, Li Jinzi, Zhang Baihao and Zhang Xinzhe won the gold medal with a time of 2 minutes 46.516 seconds.

For the 1500 m race, Yang was praised and received attention from the media. At the beginning of the race, Yang accelerated suddenly and swiftly gliding past all of her competition before she lapped the full field while in the remaining 10 laps she maintained her position in the back of other competitors. When the last lap bell went off for Yang, the other competitors completed their penultimate lap, thinking that the race was over. At this point, while appearing to have stayed at the back of the pack, Yang actually finished first with her extra lap. Her teammate Li received hand signs from her trainer, signalling that she has one more lap to go, and eventually finished second. The TikTok account of the International Olympic Committee posted the footage from the game, praising it for the "incredible strategy", with the video receiving a viewership of over 10 million.

On 18 February, at the third ISU Junior Short Track Speed Skating World Cup in Heerenveen, Netherlands, she won first place with a time of 2:21.73.

== Other honors ==
On 25 April 2024, the Heilongjiang Federation of Trade Unions awarded her the "Heilongjiang Province 1 May Labor Medal".

== See also ==
- 2024 Winter Youth Olympics medal table
