= Roberts Krūzbergs =

Latvian speed skater (born 2001)

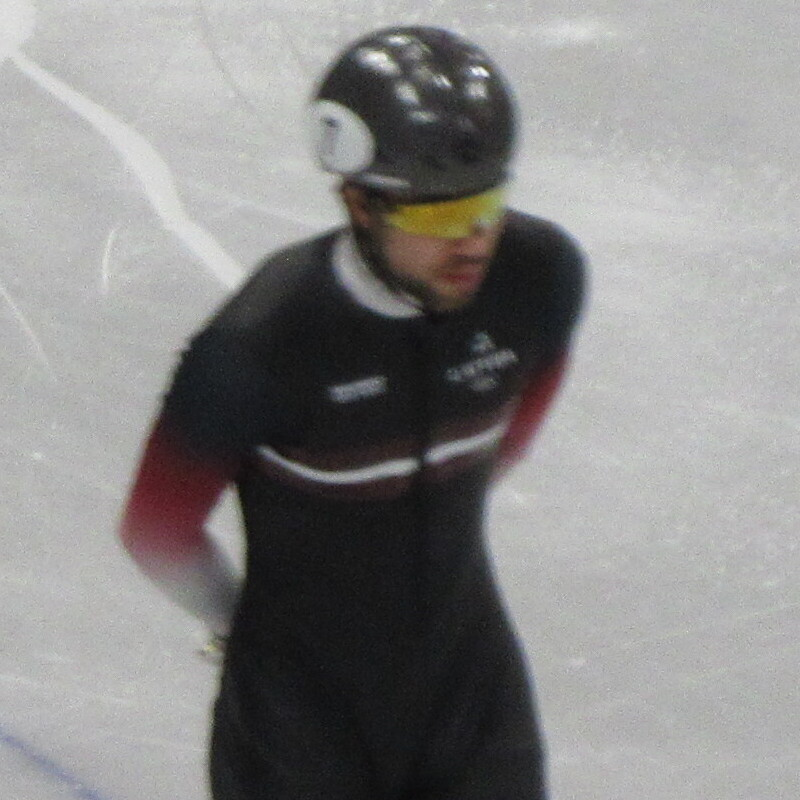
- Krūzbergs at the 2026 Winter Olympics

Personal information
- Born: 18 April 2001 (age 25) Ventspils, Latvia

Sport
- Country: Latvia
- Sport: Short-track speed skating
Medal record
Men's short-track speed skating
Representing Latvia
Olympic Games
Bronze medal – third place	2026 Milano Cortina	1500 m
European Championships
Silver medal – second place	2026 Tilburg	1500 m

Roberts Krūzbergs (born 18 April 2001) is a Latvian short-track speed skater. He represented Latvia at the 2022 and 2026 Winter Olympics. At the 2026 Winter Olympics, he won a bronze medal in the 1500 metres event.

== Career ==
In January 2026, Krūzbergs competed at the 2026 European Short Track Speed Skating Championships and won a silver medal in the 1500 metres. He was selected to represent Latvia at the 2026 Winter Olympics. He competed in the 1000 metres and finished in fifth place with a time of 1:24.681. He suffered a torn knee ligament and was injured at the start of the competition. Despite his injury, he won a bronze medal in the 1500 metres with a time of 2:12.376. He became the first Latvian to earn an Olympic medal in short-track speed skating. He did not compete in the 500 metres due to his injury.

== Personal life ==
Krūzbergs' brother, Kārlis, is also a short-track speed skater.
