= Baiba Bendika =

Latvian biathlete (born 1991)

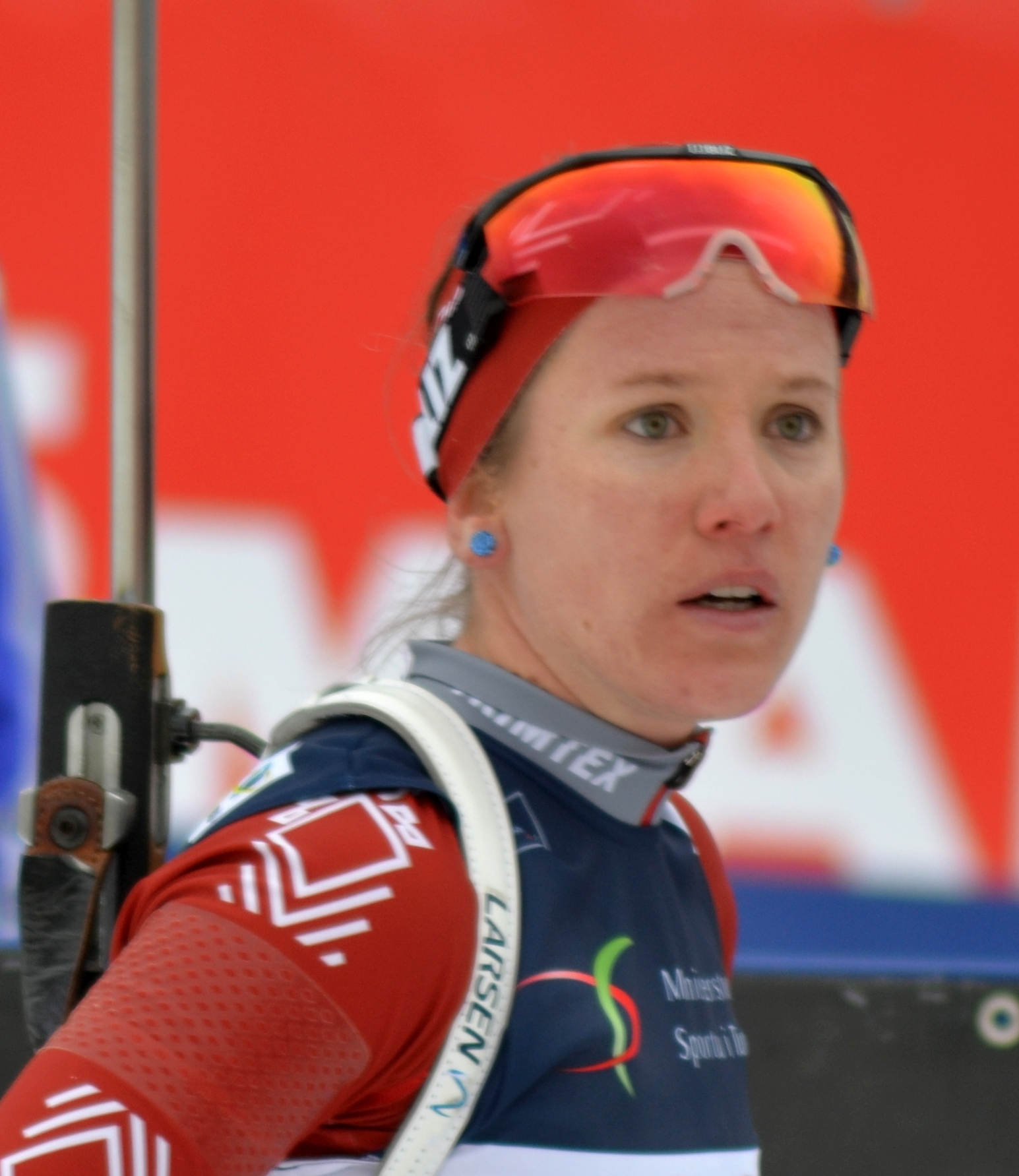
- Bendika in 2017

Personal information
- Full name: Baiba Bendika
- Born: 27 June 1991 (age 35) Cēsis, Latvia
- Height: 1.56 m (5 ft 1 in)

Sport

Professional information
- Sport: Biathlon
- World Cup debut: 2011

Olympic Games
- Teams: 3
- Medals: 0

World Championships
- Teams: 8
- Medals: 0

World Cup
- Seasons: 8 (2011/12–)
- All podiums: 1
Medal record
Women's biathlon
Representing Latvia
European Championships
Gold medal – first place	2021 Duszniki-Zdrój	7.5 km sprint
Gold medal – first place	2025 Val Martello	10 km pursuit
Bronze medal – third place	2025 Val Martello	7.5 km sprint
World Cup
Bronze medal – third place	2023 Nové Město na Moravě	Single Mixed Relays (W+M)
- Updated on 19 February 2026

Baiba Bendika (born 27 June 1991) is a Latvian biathlete and cross-country skier.

She made her Biathlon World Cup debut in 2011. During the 2015–16 World Cup season, she reached her career first Top 10, finishing fifth at the 7.5 km spring in Canmore. This was the first time she gained World Cup points. Already next week in Presque Isle, she finished 15th at the 7.5 km sprint and 13th at the 10 km pursuit.

She competed at the 2022 Winter Olympics, in the biathlon women's sprint, and women's 4 × 5 kilometre relay.

Baiba Bendika and Andrejs Rastorgujevs used nine spare rounds and the usual whirlwind dynamics accompanying the fiercest competition in the BMW IBU World Cup placed in Nové Město na Moravě, clinching third place in the single mixed relays and a first-ever relay podium for Latvia.

Since 2017 Baiba Bendika partner is a former Latvian biathlete and coach Ilmārs Bricis. Couples son Emīls was born in 2023.

== Biathlon results ==
All results are sourced from the International Biathlon Union.

=== Olympic Games ===
0 medals

Event	Individual	Sprint	Pursuit	Mass start	Relay	Mixed relay
(South Korea) 2018 Pyeongchang	39th	39th	33rd	—	—	—
(China) 2022 Beijing	58th	50th	48th	—	—	—
(Italy) 2026 Milano Cortina	22nd	15th	42nd	22nd	17th	12th

=== World Championships ===
0 medals

Event	Individual	Sprint	Pursuit	Mass start	Relay	Mixed relay	Single mixed relay
(Germany) 2012 Ruhpolding	99th	95th	—	—	LPD	LPD	—N/a
(Czech Republic) 2013 Nové Město	98th	91st	—	—	—	LPD	—N/a
(Finland) 2015 Kontiolahti	92nd	82nd	—	—	—	—	—N/a
(Norway) 2016 Oslo Holmenkollen	65th	78th	—	—	—	LPD	—N/a
(Austria) 2017 Hochfilzen	65th	50th	27th	—	—	LPD	—N/a
(Sweden) 2019 Östersund	52nd	17th	23rd	27th	—	LPD	10th
(Italy) 2020 Antholz-Anterselva	25th	12th	9th	18th	LPD	LPD	17th
(Slovenia) 2021 Pokljuka	52nd	26th	18th	9th	LPD	23rd	14th
(Germany) 2023 Oberhof	44th	62nd	—	—	—	25th	19th
(Czech Republic) 2024 Nové Město na Moravě	67th	5th	11th	23rd	15th	19th	8th
(Switzerland) 2025 Lenzerheide	25th	55th	41st	—	16th	22nd	9th

*During Olympic seasons competitions are only held for those events not included in the Olympic program.
**The single mixed relay was added as an event in 2019.

=== World Cup ===
Season	Individual		Sprint		Pursuit		Mass start		Overall	
Season	Points	Position	Points	Position	Points	Position	Points	Position	Points	Position
2011–12	—	—	—	—	—	—	—	—	—	—
2012–13	—	—	—	—	—	—	—	—	—	—
2014–15	—	—	—	—	—	—	—	—	—	—
2015–16	—	—	70	38th	35	51st	18	43rd	123	49th
2016–17	6	65th	—	—	39	49th	—	—	45	69th
2017–18	43	16th	25	63rd	10	69th	4	49th	82	55th
2018–19	43	24th	61	44th	18	64th	8	45th	130	46th
2019–20	33	32nd	85	34th	86	20th	23	38th	227	32nd

*Key:Points—won World Cup points; Position—World Cup season ranking.

== World Cup record ==
=== Finish in the Top 15 ===
Season	Position	Event	Competition
2022–23	3rd	(Czech Republic) Nové Město na Moravě	Single Mixed Relays (W+M)
2015–16	5th	(Canada) Canmore	7.5 km sprint
2018–19	5th	(Slovenia) Pokljuka	15 km individual
2021–22	9th	(Austria) Hochfilzen	7.5 km sprint
2017–18	10th	(Germany) Ruhpolding	15 km individual
2018–19	12th	(Slovenia) Pokljuka	7.5 km sprint
2015–16	13th	(United States) Presque Isle	10 km pursuit
2021–22	13th	(Norway) Oslo	7.5 km sprint
2021–22	14th	(Sweden) Östersund	7.5 km sprint
2015–16	15th	(United States) Presque Isle	7.5 km sprint
2019–20	15th	(Finland) Kontiolahti	7.5 km sprint
