= Brendan Corey =

Australian speed skater (born 1997)

Brendan Corey, OLY
Personal information
- Born: 21 January 1997 (age 29) Fredericton, New Brunswick, Canada

Sport
- Country: Australia
- Sport: Short track speed skating
- Club: Olympic Southern Flyers
Medal record
Representing Australia
World Championships
Bronze medal – third place	2024 Rotterdam	1500 m

Brendan Ronald Corey (born 21 January 1997, in Fredericton) is an Australian short track speed skater who represented Australia at the 2022 Olympics in Beijing and the 2026 Olympics in Milano-Cortina. He claimed bronze in the 1500m event at the 2024 World Championships in Rotterdam. At the 2025 World Championships he suffered a severe neck injury when an accident caused a competitor's blade to slice open his throat. Despite this setback, he recovered himself to be able to compete at the 2026 Olympics a year later.

== Personal life ==
Born in Canada, Corey moved to Australia in 2019 and holds dual Canadian and Australian citizenship.
