= Lea Popovičová =

Slovak speed skater (born 2007)

Personal information
- Born: 23 December 2007 (age 18) Prešov, Slovakia
- Height: 1.72 m (5 ft 8 in)
- Weight: 61 kg (134 lb)

Sport
- Country: Slovakia
- Sport: Speed skating
- Events: 500m, 1000m, 1500 m

Lea Popovičová (born 23 December 2007) is a Slovak speed skater who competes in short track.

== Biography ==
Lea Popovičová was born on 23 December 2007 in Prešov. She started skating at the age of 8. She studies at a gymnasium in Prešov, where she was supposed to graduate in 2026, but opted to delay her graduation by one year due to participation at the Olympics.

=== Career ===
In 2023, Popovičová qualified for the 1500m short-track finals at the 2023 European Youth Olympic Winter Festival in Friuli, Italy, eventually placing sixth.

In 2024, Popovičová placed 15th in 1500m short-track at the 2024 Winter Youth Olympics in the Gangwon Province, South Korea.

On 21 January 2026, the Slovak Speedskating Association chose Popovičová to represent Slovakia at the 2026 Winter Olympics over Tamara Tokárová, on account of Popovičová's better overall results.
