= Diána Laura Végi =

Hungarian speed skater (born 2006)

Personal information
- Born: 30 December 2006 (age 19) Debrecen, Hungary

Sport
- Country: Hungary
- Sport: Short-track speed skating
- Club: Ferencvarosi Torna Club
Medal record
Men's short-track speed skating
Representing Hungary
European Championships
Bronze medal – third place	2026 Tilburg	3000 m relay
Bronze medal – third place	2026 Tilburg	2000 m mixed relay
World Junior Championships
Gold medal – first place	2024 Gdansk	3000 m relay
Bronze medal – third place	2022 Gdańsk	3000 m relay

Diána Laura Végi (born 30 December 2006) is a Hungarian short-track speed skater. She represented Hungary at the 2026 Winter Olympics.

== Career ==
Végi represented Hungary at the 2024 Winter Youth Olympics, with her best finish being fourth place in the 1500 metres with a time of 2:42.818. She then competed at the 2024 World Junior Short Track Speed Skating Championships and won a gold medal in the 3000 metre relay.

In January 2026, Végi competed at the 2026 European Short Track Speed Skating Championships and won bronze medals in the 3000 metre relay and 2000 metre mixed relay events. She was subsequently selected to represent Hungary at the 2026 Winter Olympics. She competed in the mixed 2000 metre relay and was eliminated in the quarterfinals. During the heats of the 1000 metres she posted a time of 1:28.779 and advanced to the quarterfinals.
