= Michał Niewiński =

Polish speed skater (born 2003)

Personal information
- Born: 12 July 2003 (age 22) Białystok, Poland

Sport
- Country: Poland
- Sport: Short track speed skating
Medal record
Men's short-track speed skating
Representing Poland
World Championships
Bronze medal – third place	2024 Rotterdam	5000 m relay
Bronze medal – third place	2025 Beijing	2000 m mixed relay
European Championships
Silver medal – second place	2024 Gdańsk	2000 m mixed relay
Silver medal – second place	2025 Dresden	5000 m relay
Silver medal – second place	2026 Tilburg	2000 m mixed relay
Bronze medal – third place	2023 Gdańsk	5000 m relay
Bronze medal – third place	2024 Gdańsk	5000 m relay
Bronze medal – third place	2025 Dresden	2000 m mixed relay
Bronze medal – third place	2026 Tilburg	5000 m relay

Michał Niewiński (born 12 July 2003) is a Polish short-track speed-skater. He has won multiple medals at the European and World Championships.

== Early life ==
Niewíński was born in Białystok, where he first started skating at the age of one and a half, when his parents took him and his older brothers to the rink. He began short track skating at the age of five at a local rink under the guidance of coach Darek Kuleš.

== Career ==
By 2011, Niewíński had already competed in his first competition, and in 2014, he competed in the Polish Junior Championships, finishing third in the 500m.

Over the course of five years, Niewíński gained experience, winning various Polish junior competitions, and in 2019, he competed in his first senior Polish Championships. In 2020, he made his debut at the World Junior Championships in Bormio. In October of that year, Niewíński finished in second place in the 1000m at the Polish Championships, after which he was invited to the national team. In March 2021, at the World Championships in Dordrecht, he only finished 27th in the all-around.

In the 2021/22 season, Niewíński made his World Cup debut, and in October and November 2021, he qualified for the 2022 Winter Olympics. In February 2022, at the Beijing Winter Olympics, he finished 11th in the mixed relay and 31st in the 1500m. In March, he competed at the World Junior Championships in Gdansk, finishing fourth in the 1000m, and a month later, at the World Championships in Montreal, he finished 29th in the all-around. In December 2023, at the World Cup stage in Almaty, he made his first podium finish, finishing third in the mixed relay.

In January 2023, at his debut European Championships in Gdansk, Niewíński won a bronze medal as part of the men's relay team. His best place in the individual race was 10th in the 1000 m. Two weeks later, at the World Junior Championships in Dresden, Michal became world champion in the 500 m, won a bronze medal in the 1000 m, and finished 4th in the 1500 m. He became the first Pole to win the Junior World Championships. At the World Championships in Seoul, he finished 6th in the mixed relay and 8th in the men's relay.

In 2024, at the European Championships in Gdansk, Niewíński won a silver medal in the mixed relay and a bronze medal in the men's relay, and finished 5th in the 500 m. In February, at the World Cup in Gdansk, he and his team won bronze in the relay and in the 500 m. On 17 March, he won a bronze medal in the men's relay at the World Championships in Rotterdam. He finished 8th in the 1000 m.
