= Freestyle skiing at the 2026 Winter Olympics – Women's dual moguls =

Women's dual moguls at the XXV Olympic Winter Games
- Freestyle skiing
- Venue: Livigno Aerials & Moguls Park, Valtellina
- Date: 14 February 2026
- Competitors: 30 from 13 nations

Medalists
1st place, gold medalist(s)		Jakara Anthony	Australia
2nd place, silver medalist(s)		Jaelin Kauf	United States
3rd place, bronze medalist(s)		Elizabeth Lemley	United States

The women's dual moguls competition in freestyle skiing at the 2026 Winter Olympics was held on 14 February at the Livigno Aerials & Moguls Park in Valtellina. It was the inaugural edition of this event at the Olympics. Jakara Anthony of Australia won gold, adding to her gold medal in moguls four years earlier. Jaelin Kauf of the United States won silver, her second medal of that color at these Games, and her teammate Elizabeth Lemley won bronze.

== Background ==
There was only one event in 2025–26 FIS Freestyle Ski World Cup in dual moguls before the Olympics. It was won by Jaelin Kauf, with Elizabeth Lemley second and Tess Johnson third. Kauf was also the 2025 World champion.

Dual moguls is scored differently than individual moguls. Four judges are assigned to turns, two to air and one to speed. Judges are given five points to split between the two skiers based on the comparison between the two. The skier with the most overall points wins the round.

== Seeding ==
Rank	Bib	Name	Country
1	1	Jaelin Kauf	United States
2	2	Elizabeth Lemley	United States
3	3	Jakara Anthony	Australia
4	4	Tess Johnson	United States
5	5	Perrine Laffont	France
6	6	Olivia Giaccio	United States
7	7	Hinako Tomitaka	Japan
8	8	Anastassiya Gorodko	Kazakhstan
9	9	Maïa Schwinghammer	Canada
10	10	Rino Yanagimoto	Japan
11	11	Charlotte Wilson	Australia
12	12	Avital Carroll	Austria
13	13	Jessica Linton	Canada
14	14	Ashley Koehler	Canada
15	15	Hina Fujika	Japan
16	16	Yuliya Galysheva	Kazakhstan
17	17	Laurianne Desmarais-Gilbert	Canada
18	18	Camille Cabrol	France
19	19	Emma Bosco	Australia
20	20	Haruka Nakao	Japan
21	21	Elis Lundholm	Sweden
22	22	Ayaulym Amrenova	Kazakhstan
23	23	Marie Duaux	France
24	24	Makayla Gerken Schofield	Great Britain
25	25	Li Ruilin	China
26	26	Yun Shin-ee	South Korea
27	27	Katharina Ramsauer	Austria
28	28	Yang Ya	China
29	29	Manuela Passaretta	Italy
30	30	Malica Malherbe	South Africa

== Results ==
=== Finals ===
1/16 Finals
1	Jaelin Kauf (USA)
Bye
19	Emma Bosco (AUS)	29
11	Charlotte Wilson (AUS)	6
18	Rino Yanagimoto (JPN)	16
7	Camille Cabrol (FRA)	19
8	Anastassiya Gorodko (KAZ)	26
28	Yang Ya (CHN)	9

1/8 Finals
1	Jaelin Kauf (USA)	29
19	Emma Bosco (AUS)	6
7	Camille Cabrol (FRA)	13
8	Anastassiya Gorodko (KAZ)	22

Quarterfinals
1	Jaelin Kauf (USA)	35
8	Anastassiya Gorodko (KAZ)	DNF

1/16 Finals
5	Perrine Laffont (FRA)	29
27	Katharina Ramsauer (AUT)	6
9	Maïa Schwinghammer (CAN)	21
23	Marie Duaux (FRA)	14
15	Haruka Nakao (JPN)	16
7	Hina Fujiki (JPN)	19
17	Laurianne Desmarais-Gilbert (CAN)	13
4	Tess Johnson (USA)	22

1/8 Finals
5	Perrine Laffont (FRA)	21
9	Maïa Schwinghammer (CAN)	14
15	Hina Fujiki (JPN)	15
4	Tess Johnson (USA)	20

Quarter Finals
5	Perrine Laffont (FRA)	18
4	Tess Johnson (USA)	17

1/16 Finals
3	Jakara Anthony (AUS)	35
30	Malica Malherbe (RSA)	DNF
13	Jessica Linton (CAN)	21
22	Ayaulym Amrenova (KAZ)	14
24	Makayla Gerken Schofield (GBR)	12
12	Avital Carroll (AUT)	23
29	Manuela Passaretta (ITA)	DNF
6	Olivia Giaccio (USA)	35

1/8 Finals
3	Jakara Anthony (AUS)	27
13	Jessica Linton (CAN)	8
12	Avital Carroll (AUT)	14.5
6	Olivia Giaccio (USA)	20.5

Quarter Finals
3	Jakara Anthony (AUS)	20
6	Olivia Giaccio (USA)	15

1/16 Finals
21	Elis Lundholm (SWE)	6
7	Hinako Tomitaka (JPN)	29
16	Yuliya Galysheva (KAZ)	29
26	Yun Shin-Ee (KOR)	6
25	Li Ruilin (CHN)	DNF
14	Ashley Koehler (CAN)	35
2	Elizabeth Lemley (USA)
Bye

1/8 Finals
7	Hinako Tomitaka (JPN)	23
16	Yuliya Galysheva (KAZ)	12
25	Ashley Koehler (CAN)	10
2	Elizabeth Lemley (USA)	25

Quarter Finals
7	Hinako Tomitaka (JPN)	DNF
2	Elizabeth Lemley (USA)	35

=== Medal Rounds ===
Semifinals
1	Jaelin Kauf (USA)	35
5	Perrine Laffont (FRA)	DNF
3	Jakara Anthony (AUS)	35
2	Elizabeth Lemley (USA)	DNF

Big Final
1	Jaelin Kauf (USA)	15 (silver)
3	Jakara Anthony (AUS)	20 (gold)
Small Final
5	Perrine Laffont (FRA)	17
2	Elizabeth Lemley (USA)	18 (bronze)
