= Kazakhstan at the 2026 Winter Olympics =

- Flag of Kazakhstan
- IOC code: KAZ
- NOC: National Olympic Committee of the Republic of Kazakhstan
- Website: www.olympic.kz (in Kazakh, Russian, and English)

in Milan and Cortina d'Ampezzo, Italy 6 February 2026 – 22 February 2026
- Competitors: 36 (18 men and 18 women) in 9 sports
- Flag bearers (opening): Denis Nikisha & Ayaulym Amrenova
- Flag bearer (closing): Mikhail Shaidorov
- Medals Ranked =19th: Gold 1 Silver 0 Bronze 0 Total 1

Winter Olympics appearances (overview)
- 1994; 1998; 2002; 2006; 2010; 2014; 2018; 2022; 2026

Other related appearances
- Soviet Union (1956–1988); Unified Team (1992)

Kazakhstan competed at the 2026 Winter Olympics in Milan and Cortina d'Ampezzo, Italy, from 6 to 22 February 2026.

Short-track speed skaters Denis Nikisha and Ayaulym Amrenova were the country's flagbearers during the opening ceremony. Meanwhile, figure skater Mikhail Shaidorov was the country's flagbearer during the closing ceremony.

== Medalists ==
The following Kazakhstan competitors won medals at the games. In the discipline sections below, the medalists' names are bolded.

| Medal | Name | Sport | Event | Date |
|---|---|---|---|---|
| Gold | Mikhail Shaidorov | Figure skating | Mens singles | 13 February |

== Competitors ==
The following is the list of number of competitors participating at the Games per sport/discipline.

| Sport | Men | Women | Total |
|---|---|---|---|
| Alpine skiing | 1 | 1 | 2 |
| Biathlon | 2 | 2 | 4 |
| Cross-country skiing | 3 | 4 | 7 |
| Figure skating | 1 | 1 | 2 |
| Freestyle skiing | 5 | 4 | 9 |
| Nordic combined | 1 | —N/a | 1 |
| Short-track speed skating | 2 | 2 | 4 |
| Ski jumping | 2 | 0 | 2 |
| Speed skating | 1 | 4 | 5 |
| Total | 18 | 18 | 36 |

== Alpine skiing ==
Kazakhstan qualified one female and one male alpine skier through the basic quota.

| Athlete | Event | Run 1 | | Run 2 | | Total | |
| Athlete | Event | Time | Rank | Time | Rank | Time | Rank |
|---|---|---|---|---|---|---|---|
| Rostislav Khokhlov | Men's giant slalom | 1:26.38 | 55 | 1:20.98 | 56 | 2:47.36 | 51 |
| Rostislav Khokhlov | Men's slalom | DNF | | | | | |
| Alexandra Skorokhodova | Women's super-G | —N/a | | | | 1:31.22 | 25 |
| Alexandra Skorokhodova | Women's giant slalom | 1:08.82 | 43 | 1:14.49 | 36 | 2:23.31 | 37 |
| Alexandra Skorokhodova | Women's slalom | DNF | | | | | |

== Biathlon ==
| Athlete | Event | Time | Misses | Rank |
|---|---|---|---|---|
| Asset Dyussenov | Men's individual | 1:01:20.2 | 5 (2+2+1+0) | 74 |
| Vladislav Kireyev | Men's individual | 58:49.4 | 3 (1+2+0+0) | 53 |
| Vladislav Kireyev | Men's pursuit | 35:52.0 | 4 (1+2+1+0) | 42 |
| Asset Dyussenov | Men's sprint | 26:00.3 | 2 (2+0) | 61 |
| Vladislav Kireyev | Men's sprint | 25:41.6 | 2 (1+1) | 51 |
| Milana Geneva | Women's individual | 54:22.4 | 9 (1+2+3+3) | 89 |
| Aisha Rakisheva | Women's individual | 53:52.8 | 9 (3+3+1+2) | 90 |
| Milana Geneva | Women's sprint | 25:18.5 | 3 (1+2) | 88 |
| Aisha Rakisheva | Women's sprint | 25:52.3 | 5 (2+3) | 91 |
| Vladislav Kireyev; Asset Dyussenov; Milana Geneva; Aisha Rakisheva | Mixed relay | LAP 15:05.6 15:48.3 19:36.4 LAP | 1+7 0+6 | 21 |

== Cross-country skiing ==
Kazakhstan qualified one female and one male cross-country skier through the basic quota. Following the completion of the 2024–25 FIS Cross-Country World Cup, Kazakhstan qualified further three female and two male athletes.

Distance
Men

| Athlete | Event | Classical | | Freestyle | | Final | | |
| Athlete | Event | Time | Rank | Time | Rank | Time | Deficit | Rank |
|---|---|---|---|---|---|---|---|---|
| Nail Bashmakov | Men's freestyle | —N/a | | 24:27.8 | 74 | —N/a | | |
| Nail Bashmakov | Men's skiathlon | 25:54.6 | 50 | 24:49.5 | 49 | 51:12.6 | 5:01.6 | 49 |
| Nail Bashmakov | Men's 50 kilometre classical | —N/a | | | | DNF | | |
| Amirgali Muratbekov | Men's freestyle | —N/a | | 22:38.2 | 43 | —N/a | | |
| Amirgali Muratbekov | Men's skiathlon | 25:29.8 | 47 | 24:33.746 | 46 | 50:39.0 | 4:28.0 | 45 |
| Amirgali Muratbekov | Men's 50 kilometre classical | —N/a | | | | LAP | | 46 |
| Vitaliy Pukhkalo | Men's freestyle | —N/a | | 23:25.9 | 57 | —N/a | | |

Women

| Athlete | Event | Classical | | Freestyle | | Final | | |
| Athlete | Event | Time | Rank | Time | Rank | Time | Deficit | Rank |
|---|---|---|---|---|---|---|---|---|
| Anna Melnik | Women's freestyle | —N/a | | 28:28.7 | 81 | —N/a | | |
| Anna Melnik | Women's 50 kilometre classical | —N/a | | | | LAP | | 35 |
| Darya Ryazhko | Women's freestyle | —N/a | | 27:42.6 | 75 | —N/a | | |
| Xeniya Shalygina | Women's freestyle | —N/a | | 27:19.8 | 71 | —N/a | | |
| Xeniya Shalygina | Women's skiathlon | 32:18.3 | 52 | LAP | | | | 53 |
| Nadezhda Stepashkina | Women's freestyle | —N/a | | 26:42.6 | 63 | —N/a | | |
| Nadezhda Stepashkina | Women's skiathlon | 33:53.1 | 59 | LAP | | | | 60 |
| Nadezhda Stepashkina | Women's 50 kilometre classical | —N/a | | | | 2:40:22.6 | 23:54.4 | 31 |
| Xeniya Shalygina; Anna Melnik; Nadezhda Stepashkina; Darya Ryazhko | 4 × 7.5 km relay | —N/a | | | | LAP | | 15 |

Sprint

Men

| Athlete | Event | Qualification | | Quarterfinal | | Semifinal | | Final | |
| Athlete | Event | Time | Rank | Time | Rank | Time | Rank | Time | Rank |
|---|---|---|---|---|---|---|---|---|---|
| Nail Bashmakov | Men's sprint | 3:43.00 | 85 | Did not advance | | | | | |
| Amirgali Muratbekov | Men's sprint | 3:38.17 | 76 | Did not advance | | | | | |
| Vitaliy Pukhkalo | Men's sprint | 3:38.02 | 75 | Did not advance | | | | | |
| Nail Bashmakov; Amirgali Muratbekov | Men's team sprint | 6:35.34 | 27 | Did not advance | | | | | |

Women

| Athlete | Event | Qualification | | Quarterfinal | | Semifinal | | Final | |
| Athlete | Event | Time | Rank | Time | Rank | Time | Rank | Time | Rank |
|---|---|---|---|---|---|---|---|---|---|
| Anna Melnik | Women's sprint | 4:07.23 | 58 | Did not advance | | | | | |
| Darya Ryazhko | Women's sprint | 4:04.22 | 55 | Did not advance | | | | | |
| Xeniya Shalygina | Women's sprint | 4:16.26 | 71 | Did not advance | | | | | |
| Nadezhda Stepashkina | Women's sprint | 4:10.15 | 63 | Did not advance | | | | | |
| Darya Ryazhko; Nadezhda Stepashkina | Women's team sprint | 7:14.61 | 17 | Did not advance | | | | | |

== Figure skating ==
In the 2025 World Figure Skating Championships in Boston, the United States, Kazakhstan secured one quota in each of the men's and women's singles.

| Athlete | Event | SP/SD | | FP/FD | | Total | |
| Athlete | Event | Points | Rank | Points | Rank | Points | Rank |
|---|---|---|---|---|---|---|---|
| **Mikhail Shaidorov** | Men's singles | 92.94 | 5 **Q** | 198.64 | 1 | 291.58 | 1st place, gold medalist(s) |
| Sofia Samodelkina | Women's singles | 68.47 | 12 **Q** | 138.99 | 10 | 207.46 | 10 |

== Freestyle skiing ==
Aerials

| Athlete | Event | Qualification | | | | Final | | | |
| Athlete | Event | Jump 1 | | Jump 2 | | Jump 1 | | Jump 2 | |
| Athlete | Event | Points | Rank | Points | Rank | Points | Rank | Points | Rank |
|---|---|---|---|---|---|---|---|---|---|
| Assylkhan Assan | Men's aerials | 88.94 | 15 | 93.21 | 8 | Did not advance | | | |
| Roman Ivanov | Men's aerials | 105.75 | 11 | 81.45 | 12 | Did not advance | | | |
| Sherzod Khashirbayev | Men's aerials | 98.67 | 13 | 92.74 | 9 | Did not advance | | | |
| Dinmukhammed Raimkulov | Men's aerials | 69.47 | 22 | 90.50 | 10 | Did not advance | | | |
| Ayana Zholdas | Women's aerials | 61.11 | 17 | 57.10 | 18 | Did not advance | | | |

Team aerials

| Athlete | Event | Qualification | | Final | |
| Athlete | Event | Jump 1 | | Jump 2 | |
| Athlete | Event | Points | Rank | Points | Rank |
|---|---|---|---|---|---|
| Ayana Zholdas; Roman Ivanov; Assylkhan Assan | Mixed team aerials | 213.93 | 7 | Did not advance | |

Moguls

| Athlete | Event | Qualification | | | | | | | | Final | | | | | | | |
| Athlete | Event | Run 1 | | | | Run 2 | | | | Run 1 | | | | Run 2 | | | Rank |
| Athlete | Event | Time | Points | Total | Rank | Time | Points | Total | Rank | Time | Points | Total | Rank | Time | Points | Total | Rank |
|---|---|---|---|---|---|---|---|---|---|---|---|---|---|---|---|---|---|
| Pavel Kolmakov | Men's moguls | 23.55 | 59.94 | 76.24 | 9 | Bye | | | | 23.26 | 59.01 | 75.70 | 16 | Did not advance | | | |
| Ayaulym Amrenova | Women's moguls | 27.77 | 48.15 | 63.50 | 20 | 27.96 | 53.85 | 68.98 | 10 **Q** | 27.52 | 52.83 | 68.47 | 18 | Did not advance | | | |
| Yuliya Galysheva | Women's moguls | 27.63 | 54.09 | 69.60 | 14 | 27.68 | 57.63 | 73.08 | 5 **Q** | 26.92 | 55.99 | 72.34 | 14 | Did not advance | | | |
| Anastassiya Gorodko | Women's moguls | 26.95 | 54.67 | 70.98 | 12 | 26.54 | 54.73 | 71.52 | 7 **Q** | 25.44 | 54.06 | 72.15 | 15 | Did not advance | | | |

Dual moguls

| Athlete | Event | 1/16 Final | 1/8 Final | Quarterfinal | Semifinal | Final | |
| Athlete | Event | Opposition Result | Opposition Result | Opposition Result | Opposition Result | Opposition Result | Rank |
|---|---|---|---|---|---|---|---|
| Pavel Kolmakov | Men's dual moguls | de Villaucourt (FRA); **W** 22–13 | Kingsbury (CAN); L 12–23 | Did not advance | | | |
| Ayaulym Amrenova | Women's dual moguls | Linton (CAN); L 14–21 | Did not advance | | | | |
| Yuliya Galysheva | Women's dual moguls | Yun (KOR); **W** 29–6 | Tomitaka (JPN); L 12–23 | Did not advance | | | |
| Anastassiya Gorodko | Women's dual moguls | Yang (CHN); **W** 26–9 | Cabrol (FRA); **W** 22–13 | Kauf (USA); L DNF–35 | Did not advance | | |

== Nordic combined ==
| Athlete | Event | Ski jumping | | | Cross-country | | Total | |
| Athlete | Event | Distance | Points | Rank | Time | Rank | Time | Rank |
|---|---|---|---|---|---|---|---|---|
| Chingiz Rakparov | Individual normal hill/10 km | 84.0 | 87.9 | 35 | 35:49.0 | 32 | 38:48.0 | 32 |
| Chingiz Rakparov | Individual large hill/10 km | 108.0 | 88.4 | 35 | 28:36.0 | 32 | 32:42.0 | 32 |

== Short-track speed skating ==
Kazakhstan qualified four short-track speed skaters (two per gender) after the conclusion of the 2025–26 ISU Short Track World Tour.

| Athlete | Event | Heat | | Quarterfinal | | Semifinal | | Final | |
| Athlete | Event | Time | Rank | Time | Rank | Time | Rank | Time | Rank |
|---|---|---|---|---|---|---|---|---|---|
| Abzal Azhgaliyev | Men's 500 m | 40.934 | 1 **Q** | 41.549 | 5 | Did not advance | | | |
| Denis Nikisha | Men's 500 m | 40.818 | 3 **q** | 40.562 | 3 **q** | 40.871 | 4 **QB** | 41.948 | 2 |
| Denis Nikisha | Men's 1000 m | 1:25.987 | 3 | Did not advance | | | | | |
| Yana Khan | Women's 500 m | 1:19.722 | 4 | Did not advance | | | | | |
| Olga Tikhonova | Women's 500 m | 46.352 | 4 | Did not advance | | | | | |
| Olga Tikhonova | Women's 1000 m | 1:31.771 | 4 | Did not advance | | | | | |
| Yana Khan | Women's 1500 m | —N/a | | 3:08.414 | 4 | Did not advance | | | |
| Olga Tikhonova | Women's 1500 m | —N/a | | 2:30.169 | 5 | Did not advance | | | |
| Abzal Azhgaliyev; Yana Khan; Denis Nikisha; Olga Tikhonova | Mixed 2000 m relay | —N/a | | 2.42.199 | 4 | Did not advance | | | |

== Ski jumping ==
| Athlete | Event | First round | | | Final round | | | Total | |
| Athlete | Event | Distance | Points | Rank | Distance | Points | Rank | Points | Rank |
|---|---|---|---|---|---|---|---|---|---|
| Ilya Mizernykh | Men's normal hill | 100.0 | 117.0 | 39 | Did not advance | | | | |
| Ilya Mizernykh | Men's large hill | 140.5 | 137.0 | 8 **Q** | 136.0 | 144.6 | 6 | 281.6 | 8 |
| Danil Vassilyev | Men's normal hill | 101.0 | 120.3 | 34 | Did not advance | | | | |
| Danil Vassilyev | Men's large hill | 131.5 | 66.3 | 29 **Q** | 126.5 | 57.3 | 26 | 235.9 | 27 |

| Athlete | Event | First round | | | Second round | | | Final round | | | Total | |
| Athlete | Event | Distance | Points | Rank | Distance | Points | Rank | Distance | Points | Rank | Points | Rank |
|---|---|---|---|---|---|---|---|---|---|---|---|---|
| Ilya Mizernykh; Danil Vassilyev | Men's super team large hill | 257.5 | 250.6 | 11 **Q** | 246.5 | 231.8 | 12 | Did not advance | | | | |

== Speed skating ==
Kazakhstan qualified five speed skaters (one men and four women) through performances at the 2025-26 ISU Speed Skating World Cup.

| Athlete | Event | Race | |
| Athlete | Event | Time | Rank |
|---|---|---|---|
| Yevgeniy Koshkin | Men's 500 m | 34.56 | 9 |
| Arina Ilyachshenko | Women's 500 m | 39.38 | 29 |
| Kristina Silaeva | Women's 500 m | 38.33 | 18 |
| Elizaveta Golubeva | Women's 1000 m | 1:16.40 | 19 |
| Nadezhda Morozova | Women's 1000 m | 1:16.00 | 14 |
| Kristina Silaeva | Women's 1000 m | 1:17.57 | 28 |
| Elizaveta Golubeva | Women's 1500 m | 1:54.868 | 7 |
| Arina Ilyachshenko | Women's 1500 m | 1:58.43 | 24 |
| Nadezhda Morozova | Women's 1500 m | 1:55.76 | 12 |
| Elizaveta Golubeva | Women's 3000 m | 4:03.30 | 10 |
| Nadezhda Morozova | Women's 3000 m | 4:01.20 | 6 |
| Nadezhda Morozova | Women's 5000 m | 7:04.81 | 10 |

Mass start

| Athlete | Event | Semifinal | | | Final | | |
| Athlete | Event | Points | Time | Rank | Points | Time | Rank |
|---|---|---|---|---|---|---|---|
| Elizaveta Golubeva | Women's | 3 | 8:44.66 | 7 **Q** | 0 | 8:38.07 | 16 |

Team pursuit

| Athlete | Event | Quarterfinal | | Semifinal | | Final | |
| Athlete | Event | Opposition Time | Rank | Opposition Time | Rank | Opposition Time | Rank |
|---|---|---|---|---|---|---|---|
| Elizaveta Golubeva; Arina Ilyachshenko; Nadezhda Morozova | Women's | DNF | 8 **FD** | Did not advance | | Final D China; **L*** | 8 |

* - Kazakhstan withdrew from Women's team pursuit and the Final D didn't take place.

== See also ==
- Kazakhstan at the 2026 Winter Paralympics
