= FIS Freestyle Ski and Snowboarding World Championships 2023 – Women's dual moguls =

Women's dual moguls at the FIS Freestyle Ski and Snowboarding World Championships 2023
- Location: Bakuriani, Georgia
- Dates: 26 February
- Competitors: 25 from 11 nations

Medalists
gold medal	Perrine Laffont	France
silver medal	Jaelin Kauf	United States
bronze medal	Avital Carroll	Austria

The Women's dual moguls competition at the FIS Freestyle Ski and Snowboarding World Championships 2023 was held on 26 February 2023.

== Results ==
=== Finals ===
Semifinals
(France) Perrine Laffont	35
(Austria) Avital Carroll	DNF
(United States) Hannah Soar	7
(United States) Jaelin Kauf	28

Final
(France) Perrine Laffont	20
(United States) Jaelin Kauf	15
Third place
(Austria) Avital Carroll	22
(United States) Hannah Soar	13

=== Top half ===
==== Section 1 ====
Round of 32
(China) Cao Tianqing	10
(Finland) Riikka Voutilainen	25
(China) Yang Ya	7
(Canada) Laurianne Desmarais-Gilbert	28
(United Kingdom) Makayla Gerken Schofield	30
(China) Ma Zhuoni	5

Round of 16
(France) Perrine Laffont	30
(Finland) Riikka Voutilainen	5
(Canada) Laurianne Desmarais-Gilbert	15
(United Kingdom) Makayla Gerken Schofield	20

Quarterfinals
(France) Perrine Laffont	20
(United Kingdom) Makayla Gerken Schofield	15

==== Section 2 ====
Round of 32
(France) Fantine Degroote	13
(Germany) Annika Merz	22
(China) Li Ruilin	DNF
(Kazakhstan) Ayaulym Amrenova	35

Round of 16
(Japan) Rino Yanagimoto	29
(Germany) Annika Merz	6
(Kazakhstan) Ayaulym Amrenova	10
(Austria) Avital Carroll	25

Quarterfinals
(Japan) Rino Yanagimoto	12
(Austria) Avital Carroll	23

=== Bottom half ===
==== Section 3 ====
Round of 32
(Japan) Hinako Tomitaka	24
(Canada) Berkley Brown	11
(Germany) Hanna Weese	13
(United States) Hannah Soar	22

Round of 16
(United States) Elizabeth Lemley	24
(Japan) Hinako Tomitaka	11
(United States) Hannah Soar	19
(United States) Olivia Giaccio	16

Quarterfinals
(United States) Elizabeth Lemley	17
(United States) Hannah Soar	18

==== Section 4 ====
Round of 32
(Netherlands) Janneke Berghuis	8
(France) Camille Cabrol	27
(Japan) Haruka Nakao	22
(Austria) Katharina Ramsauer	13

Round of 16
(Canada) Maïa Schwinghammer	35
(France) Camille Cabrol	DNF
(Japan) Haruka Nakao	8
(United States) Jaelin Kauf	27

Quarterfinals
(Canada) Maïa Schwinghammer	2
(United States) Jaelin Kauf	33
