= FIS Freestyle Ski and Snowboarding World Championships 2023 – Women's moguls =

Women's moguls at the FIS Freestyle Ski and Snowboarding World Championships 2023
- Location: Bakuriani, Georgia
- Dates: 25 February

Medalists
gold medal	Perrine Laffont	France
silver medal	Jaelin Kauf	United States
bronze medal	Avital Carroll	Austria

The Women's moguls competition at the FIS Freestyle Ski and Snowboarding World Championships 2023 was held on 25 February 2023.

== Qualification ==
The qualification was started at 09:30. The best 18 skiers qualified for the final.

Rank	Bib	Start order	Name	Country	Q1	Q2	Notes
1	1	4	Perrine Laffont	France	83.93		Q
2	4	3	Jaelin Kauf	United States	79.73		Q
3	7	18	Olivia Giaccio	United States	78.70		Q
4	11	2	Hannah Soar	United States	76.03		Q
5	5	1	Elizabeth Lemley	United States	74.50		Q
6	2	15	Jakara Anthony	Australia	73.47		Q
7	8	17	Avital Carroll	Austria	72.47		Q
8	12	12	Hinako Tomitaka	Japan	72.28		Q
9	9	24	Makayla Gerken Schofield	Great Britain	67.53		Q
10	6	25	Rino Yanagimoto	Japan	17.02	74.08	Q
11	10	22	Maïa Schwinghammer	Canada	62.15	73.56	Q
12	14	11	Fantine Degroote	France	67.26	67.31	Q
13	20	9	Berkley Brown	Canada	63.88	67.26	Q
14	16	10	Camille Cabrol	France	63.09	65.09	Q
15	15	23	Ayaulym Amrenova	Kazakhstan	64.56	64.09	Q
16	13	20	Haruka Nakao	Japan	21.43	62.97	Q
17	17	13	Laurianne Desmarais-Gilbert	Canada	57.15	61.87	Q
18	26	8	Hanna Weese	Germany	58.53	56.96	Q
19	21	7	Annika Merz	Germany	51.85	54.93	
20	18	13	Katharina Ramsauer	Austria	52.40	50.04	
21	27	26	Riikka Voutilainen	Finland	50.60	11.46	
22	19	6	Janneke Berghuis	Netherlands	49.54	50.48	
23	23	19	Cao Tianqing	China	49.09	DNF	
24	22	14	Ma Zhuoni	China	40.86	46.55	
25	24	16	Yang Ya	China	41.53	42.50	
26	25	21	Li Ruilin	China	40.86	27.76	

== Final ==
The final was started at 11:30.

Rank	Bib	Name	Country	Final 1	Final 2
1st place, gold medalist(s)	1	Perrine Laffont	France	87.60	87.40
2nd place, silver medalist(s)	4	Jaelin Kauf	United States	81.90	83.56
3rd place, bronze medalist(s)	8	Avital Carroll	Austria	79.32	80.19
4	6	Rino Yanagimoto	Japan	79.52	79.67
5	10	Maïa Schwinghammer	Canada	79.10	13.37
6	5	Elizabeth Lemley	United States	77.48	DNF
7	14	Fantine Degroote	France	76.10	—
8	11	Hannah Soar	United States	76.08	—
9	9	Makayla Gerken Schofield	Great Britain	74.75	—
10	16	Camille Cabrol	France	72.83	—
11	17	Laurianne Desmarais-Gilbert	Canada	72.59	—
12	7	Olivia Giaccio	United States	71.31	—
13	13	Haruka Nakao	Japan	69.77	—
14	26	Hanna Weese	Germany	69.98	—
15	20	Berkley Brown	Canada	67.18	—
16	12	Hinako Tomitaka	Japan	64.97	—
17	2	Jakara Anthony	Australia	55.29	—
18	15	Ayaulym Amrenova	Kazakhstan	48.59	—
