= Jakara Anthony =

Australian freestyle skier (born 1998)

Jakara Anthony OAM
Personal information
- Born: 8 July 1998 (age 28) Cairns, Queensland, Australia
- Height: 1.70 m (5 ft 7 in)

Sport
- Country: Australia
- Sport: Freestyle skiing
- Event: Moguls

World Cup career
- Seasons: 11 (2015 to 2026)
- Indiv. starts: 89 (MO – 58, DM – 31)
- Indiv. podiums: 46 (MO – 30, DM – 16)
- Indiv. wins: 26 (MO – 17, DM – 9)
- Discipline titles: 2 – overall moguls (2022, 2024); 3 – moguls (2023, 2024, 2026); 2 – dual moguls (2022, 2024)
Medal record
Women's freestyle skiing
Representing Australia
World Cup race podiums
Event	1st	2nd	3rd
Moguls	17	10	3
Dual moguls	9	3	4
Total	26	13	7
International freestyle ski competitions
Event	1st	2nd	3rd
Olympic Games	2	0	0
World Championships	0	1	0
Total	2	1	0
Olympic Games
Gold medal – first place	2022 Beijing	Moguls
Gold medal – first place	2026 Milano Cortina	Dual moguls
World Championships
Silver medal – second place	2019 Utah	Moguls
- Updated on 11 March 2026

Jakara Anthony OAM (born 8 July 1998) is an Australian freestyle skier and two-time Olympic gold medallist. She is the Olympic champion from the women's moguls event at the 2022 Winter Olympics, becoming Australia's sixth Winter Olympic Games gold medallist. She holds the record for the most World Cup circuit victories in a season in women's moguls, achieved during the 2023/24 season. At the 2019 FIS World Championships, she finished with a silver medal. She also won gold at the inaugural women's dual moguls event at the 2026 Winter Olympics in Milan, becoming Australia's first Winter Olympics double gold medalist.

Anthony was awarded the Medal of the Order of Australia in the 2022 Queen's Birthday Honours for service to sport as a gold medallist at the Beijing Winter Olympic Games in 2022.

== Early years ==
Born in the tropical North Queensland city of Cairns, Anthony's family moved to Barwon Heads, her hometown, when she was in pre-school. She began skiing at the age of four, as her parents worked as seasonal workers at Mount Buller, spending the winter months skiing and attending primary school and relocated back to Barwon Heads for the summer. At the age of 11, Anthony joined Mount Buller's moguls program.

== Career beginnings (2015–2021) ==
Anthony made her World Cup circuit debut in 2015 at the age of 16, finishing 33rd.

In 2017, she made her World Championship debut, finishing 12th overall in the standings in the moguls.

In January 2018, in the lead-up to her first Olympic Games, Anthony achieved a personal-best fifth-place finish at the World Cup event in Deer Valley, reaching the super-final for the first time in her career.

=== 2018 Winter Olympics ===
Anthony entered the women's moguls event at the Olympics as the 14th seed, finishing 14th in her first qualifying event and advancing to the second qualifying round with 69.49 points.

She progressed through to her second-ever Super Final, finishing fourth with a score of 75.35, only 2.05 points behind bronze medallist Yuliya Galysheva, and 3.30 points behind Olympic champion Perrine Laffont. Her fourth-place finish was considered a surprise, which included finishing ahead of compatriot and defending World Champion, Britt Cox, by 0.27 points. Anthony was pleased with her fourth-place finish, noting that it was her personal best across all her events in her career thus far.

=== 2018/19 season ===
The 2018/19 season continued Anthony's upwards trajectory, winning her first World Cup medal in Thaiwoo, China; as well as her first World Cup circuit victory in Lake Placid.

At the 2019 World Championships, Anthony finished as the top qualifier during the moguls qualification round. She finished with the silver medal, the first major championship medal in her career, behind Kazakhstan's Yuliya Galysheva.

== Breakthrough and Olympic gold medal (2021–2023) ==
=== 2021/2022 season ===
In the final event before the Olympics at Deer Valley, Anthony won the silver medal behind Anri Kawamura, ahead of defending Olympic champion Perrine Laffont, with the three medallists finishing less than a point apart. This meant she entered the Olympic competition as the third seed overall, behind first-seeded Kawamura and second-seeded Laffont, having won one event throughout the World Cup season.

==== 2022 Winter Olympics ====
During qualification, Anthony finished first overall. Unlike at the 2018 Olympics, Anthony felt it was "tough" during the waiting period between qualification and the finals, as COVID-19 restrictions in China meant athletes were not able to train on snow until competition day. Once the training period began for the athletes participating in the final, Anthony recalled feeling, "we’re on here, I can do this," which continued as the finals competition began that evening.

In the first finals round, Anthony finished as the top competitor again, with an 81.91-point run; repeating this during the second finals round, finishing first with 81.29 points. As the last skier to go in the Super Final, Anthony described the "state of flow" she felt during her final run and knew that her run was good enough for gold from the moment she finished. Scoring 83.09 points, Anthony became the Olympic champion, with American Jaelin Kauf finishing second, 2.81 points behind.

Anthony's "cork 720 mute" was notably the most difficult aerial trick throughout the women's event, making her the first woman in history to land one at an Olympic Games. This trick proved pivotal to Anthony's dominance throughout the event, a dominance her rivals, including Laffont and Kawamura, could not match. When discussing her aerial skills, which contributed to her high-scoring run at the Olympics, Anthony noted the need to improve them to match the rest of the field, commenting, "The women’s aerial packages have progressed so much since PyeongChang – it’s like night and day." She also credited the then-newly installed aerial water ramp in Brisbane, built for Australia's moguls and aerial skiing teams, as "a game-changing" development, particularly during the COVID-19 pandemic when they were unable to access overseas resources.

The final was attended by fellow Australian Winter Olympic champions, Alisa Camplin and Lydia Lassila. Camplin, who also acted as Anthony's mentor at the Olympics, praised her for being "steely under pressure." Lassila praised Anthony's "controlled" and "pure dominance" over the competition.

Anthony's gold medal made her the sixth Australian to win a Winter Olympic event and Australia's first Winter Olympic gold medal since 2010. In addition, along with Tess Coady's bronze medal in the women's slopestyle event earlier in the day, they became the first Australians in Winter Olympic history to win medals on the same day. She also became the first Australian to win gold in the women's moguls event.

==== Post-Olympics ====
Anthony's 12th medal of the season, from the women's moguls final in Megève, France, made her season the most successful by an Australian winter sports athlete, surpassing Alisa Camplin and Britt Cox in 2016/17. She also won her first Crystal Globe for overall moguls and dual moguls, finishing ahead of Laffont in both events, while Laffont won the Crystal Globe in the singles event.

=== 2022/23 season ===
Anthony continued her momentum from her Olympic victory, winning three of the first four events of the season and earning her first Crystal Globe in the mogul event. She earned her first victory at Ruka, Finland, earning most of her points in her aerial and turn sections, finishing three points ahead of her closest competitor. Her win at Deer Valley coincided with Matt Graham's victory in the men's event, marking only the second time in history that the Australian team won the men's and women's event in the moguls discipline.

== Record-breaking winning streak and injury (2023–present) ==
=== 2023/24 season ===
Anthony's World Cup season became not only the most outstanding of her career, but also one of the best mogul seasons of all time, achieving a record haul of wins and the highest points tally in the sport's history.

Anthony's second moguls win came at Idre Fjäll, Sweden, winning with a 79.74-point run during the final round, with Rino Yanagimoto and Olivia Giaccio finishing second and third, respectively. Her fourth win of the season came in Bakuriani, Georgia, after qualifying and finishing first in all rounds of the competition, with a two-point gap between her and silver medallist Yanagimoto in the Super Final.

Anthony's only one of two losses during the season came at the dual moguls competition in Deer Valley, losing to Olympic silver medallist Jaelin Kauf. She rebounded in the dual moguls event, beating Kauf with a score of 22–13, with a run that Anthony called "one of my best competition runs I have ever done."

In Kazakhstan, Anthony achieved her 12th and 13th victories of the season, surpassing Hannah Kearney's record of most victories in a season, winning seven singles and five dual events. These victories guaranteed that she would win all three Crystal Globes on offer for the season. Her mogul win in Kazakhstan left her 6.57 points ahead of second-place Hannah Soar and gave her a 220-point lead on the World Cup circuit, ahead of Jaelin Kauf, with only one dual moguls event to take place in Italy in March, when Anthony took the victory over Kauf for the fifth consecutive time.

Overall, Anthony at the end of the season had won fourteen of the sixteen moguls events held throughout the entire season, with a points total of 1480, 416 points ahead of Kauf, who finished second. She won all three Crystal Globes in moguls, dual moguls and overall points, saying, "The season’s been absolutely wild," while also joking "I’m going to have some big luggage issues getting back to Australia tomorrow.” When asked about her next goal, she stated her focus for the next season was to achieve a World Championship title, her only missing major title. Anthony's total victories on the World Cup circuit rose to 21 overall, leaving her three behind the all-time Australian record by aerial skier Jacqui Cooper. When reflecting on the record-breaking season, she said, "It was the longest season I’ve ever competed in with 16 starts, [...] it was really about taking it literally one run at a time and trying to not get too far ahead of ourselves."

=== 2024/25 season ===
Anthony continued her podium streak into the beginning of the 2024/25 season, with a silver to Perrine Laffont, who was returning from a year-long absence, in Ruka, Finland. Anthony welcomed the return of Laffont to competition, citing it as an extra form of motivation to continue the high standards she set after her Olympic gold in Beijing, adding, "I think it's great to have so many chicks up there at that top end of the sport, that's what makes it exciting." This medal made her the most successful Australian winter athlete in FIS World Cup history, with 42 podiums, breaking the record set by aerial skier Kirstie Marshall.

After a win in Idre Fjäll, Sweden, marking Anthony's 15th win in the past 18 overall moguls events, her incredible run of form came to a sudden end when she broke her collarbone during a training session before the dual moguls event, which was later cancelled due to poor visibility conditions. She had surgery in Oslo and missed the rest of the season, returning home to Australia. During her injury recovery, she was the prominent athlete promoting the 2026 Winter Olympics in Australia, remaining at home for the entire Australian summer to access specialised medical facilities to aid her recovery and promote the Olympics. When discussing her injury during the Australian Open, she said, "While it's always very frustrating being injured, this is the biggest injury I've had, so I've actually had a pretty good run." When asked about defending her Olympic title, Anthony added that it would depend on "a good performance on the night." She missed the 2025 World Championships in Engadin, Switzerland, due to her injury, missing the opportunity to win an elusive world title.

=== 2025/26 season ===
Anthony made her return to competition in Ruka, Finland, with two moguls events occurring on back-to-back days. This was er first competitive event in a year. In her first competition in Ruka, she flew off the course during the mogul section and missed the podium.

In the final round of the second competition in Ruka, Anthony scored 79.89 points to win the event, beating Olivia Giaccio by 0.25 points, and stated the win felt "special," coming one year and one day after her season-ending collarbone injury last year. When discussing her return to competition, particularly after her performance in the previous event of the weekend, Anthony remarked she needed to "remember" how to ski in competition and make "adjustments" back to a competitive environment, remarking that yesterday's finals performance "was a bummer." Along with Matt Graham winning the men's event, the Australian team completed a gold-medal sweep in an event for the first time since Anthony and Graham achieved it in the dual moguls in Deer Valley in 2023, and only the third time in history that Australia had won both the men's and women's gold medals in the same event. Following the cancellation of the moguls World Cup event in Georgia, Anthony had to wait until January for more competition training.

Anthony’s second World Cup victory of the season occurred at Val Saint-Côme, Canada after the finals were cancelled and qualification scores determined the results, with Anthony setting the highest score in qualification. She then was victorious at Waterville Valley, her 26th World Cup victory, eclipsing the record of most World Cup wins by an Australian athlete in any discipline, overtaking aerial skier Jacqui Cooper.

=== 2026 Winter Olympics ===
Anthony was announced, on 4 February 2026, as Australia's female flag bearer for the parade of nations at the 2026 Winter Olympics. During the press conference, she said that becoming the flag bearer did not seem "feasible" and that she was "lost for words" when she was told she had been selected. Her Olympics campaign began six days later, on 10 February, she finished in first place in the first qualification round of the moguls with a score of 81.65, qualifying for the final. She entered the Super Final as the favourite to win gold, achieving the highest score in the event, 83.96 points, during the first half of the final. However, a crash at the top half of the moguls, which caused her to ski off the course, she received a score of 60.81 in the final, finishing in 8th place, with the gold medal being won by American Elizabeth Lemley. Anthony when speaking to the media after the final said she felt "bummed", concluding that the loss in the final round was "It's just the nature of our sport," and still felt "happy" with her performance in the event.

On 14 February, Anthony competed once more in the dual moguls, the first appearance of the event at an Olympic Games. This was second dual event in the past two and a half years, having done the event only once since her broken collarbone injury in 2024. She began the competition with a 35-point victory over South African Malica Malherbe, and won her round of 16 dual against Canada's Jessica Linton 27-8, advancing to the quarterfinals. Her quarterfinal was against Olivia Giaccio, narrowly winning the dual and advancing to the final four. In the semi-final, Anthony met moguls gold medallist Lemley, with Lemley falling during her run and not completing the course, ensuring that Anthony advanced to the final, and guaranteeing her a second Olympic medal.

In the dual moguls final, Anthony competed against long-time rival Jaelin Kauf, who finished second in the moguls event, in the Big Finals, beating her by 5 points. Her win in the final made her the first Olympic dual moguls gold medallist. This victory made Anthony the most successful Australian in Winter Olympic history, and the first Australian to win two gold medals at the Winter Olympics. It was Australia's 3rd gold medal at the games, making it Australia's overall best Winter Olympics performance. When reflecting on her gold medal, Anthony described the adversity after her surprise loss in the moguls that left her "doubting myself a bit," her victory in the dual moguls was made "more special", describing the days between her two events as "an emotional rollercoaster."

== Personal life ==
Anthony is studying for a Bachelor of Exercise and Sport Science at Deakin University.

In August 2025, the moguls course at Mount Buller was named after her.

== Results ==
=== Olympic Winter Games ===
As of 18 February 2026

Year	Age	Moguls	Dual moguls
(South Korea) 2018 Pyeongchang	19	4	N/A
(China) 2022 Beijing	23	1	N/A
(Italy) 2026 Milano Cortina	27	8	1

=== World Championships ===
As of 18 February 2026

Year	Age	Moguls	Dual moguls
(Spain) 2017 Sierra Nevada	18	12	16
(United States) 2019 Utah	20	2	7
(Kazakhstan) 2021 Almaty	22	4	11
(Georgia (country)) 2023 Bakuriani	24	17	DNC
(Switzerland) 2025 Engadin	26	DNC	

=== World Cup ===
==== Season standings ====
As of 10 March 2026

Year	Overall moguls	Moguls	Dual moguls
2015	–	—N/a	—N/a
2016	41	—N/a	—N/a
2017	22	—N/a	—N/a
2018	17	—N/a	—N/a
2019	3	—N/a	—N/a
2020	2	—N/a	—N/a
2021	10	—N/a	—N/a
2022	1	3	1
2023	2	1	6
2024	1	1	1
2025	20	13	–
2026	2	1	6

==== Results by round ====
As of 10 March 2026

==== Key to colours ====
Winner
Second place
Third place
Other points finish Top15
Other points finish Top30
No points finish
Did not attend (–) or event cancelled (~~C~~)

==== Key to locations ====
- RUK = Ruka
- CAL = Calgary (Canada Olympic Park)
- DVR = Deer Valley Resort
- LKP = Lake Placid
- VSC = Val Saint-Côme
- TAZ = Tazawako
- MEG = Megève
- MOW = Moscow
- BPP = Bogwang Phoenix Park
- THW = Thaiwoo
- TRM = Mont Tremblant Resort
- AIR = Airolo
- ALM = Almaty (Shymbulak Mountain Resort)
- KRA = Krasnoyarsk
- IDR = Idre Fjäll
- ADH = Alpe d'Huez
- VAL = Chiesa in Valmalenco (Valtellina)
- BAK = Bakuriani
- WAT = Waterville Valley Resort
- BEI = Beidahu
- LIV = Livigno
- NAN = Nanto (Taira Ski Area)
- SHA = Shahdag Mountain Resort

==== Other notes ====
- Locations in normal font are mogul events.
- Locations in italics are dual mogul events.

Year	Round																			Evnt	Pods	Wins	MO	DM	MODM	Ovr
Year	1	2	3	4	5	6	7	8	9	10	11	12	13	14	15	16	17	18	19	Evnt	Pods	Wins	MO	DM	MODM	Ovr
2015	RUK –	CAL –	DVR; 33	DVR; 39	LKP –	VSC –	TAZ –	TAZ –	MEG –											2 (1–1)	0	0	—N/a	—N/a	–	–
2016	RUK –	~~LKP~~; ~~C~~	VSC –	CAL –	DVR; 31	DVR; 22	TAZ –	TAZ –	MOW –											2 (1–1)	0	0	—N/a	—N/a	41st (9)	184th (1.13)
2017	RUK –	LKP; 20	VSC; 20	CAL; 20	DVR; 14	DVR; 21	BPP; 21	TAZ; 9	TAZ; 16	THW –	THW –									8 (6–2)	0	0	—N/a	—N/a	22nd (128)	95th (11.64)
2018	RUK; 12	THW; 14	THW; 21	CAL; 26	DVR; 5	DVR; 12	TRM; 21	TAZ –	TAZ –	~~AIR~~; ~~C~~	MEG –									7 (7–0)	0	0	—N/a	—N/a	17th (142)	95th (14.20)
2019	RUK; 4	THW; 2	THW; 5	CAL; 4	LKP; 1	TRM; 2	TAZ; 2	TAZ; 3	ALM –											8 (6–2)	5 (4–1)	1 (1–0)	—N/a	—N/a	3rd (545)	6th (60.56)
2020	RUK; 5	THW; 4	THW; 9	TRM; 4	CAL; 4	DVR; 2	DVR; 6	TAZ; 3	ALM; 2	KRA; 2										10 (6–4)	4 (2–2)	0 (–)	—N/a	—N/a	2nd (564)	7th (56.40)
2021	RUK; 9	IDR; 8	IDR; 9	DVR; 6	DVR; 11															5 (3–2)	0	0	—N/a	—N/a	10th (154)	—N/a
2022	RUK; 2	IDR; 3	IDR; 3	ADH; 1	ADH; 1	TRM; 5	TRM; 2	DVR; 3	DVR; 2	VAL; 1	MEG; 2	MEG; 2								12 (8–4)	11 (7–4)	3 (1–2)	3rd (585)	1st (340)	1st (925)	—N/a
2023	RUK; 1	IDR; 1	IDR; 4	ADH; 1	ADH; 3	VSC; 2	VSC; 9	DVR; 1	DVR; 5	VAL; 5	ALM –	ALM –								10 (5–5)	6 (5–1)	4 (4–0)	1st (480)	6th (229)	2nd (709)	—N/a
2024	RUK; 1	IDR; 1	IDR; 3	ADH; 1	ADH; 1	BAK; 1	BAK; 1	VSC; 1	VSC; 1	WAT; 1	WAT; 1	DVR; 13	DVR; 1	ALM; 1	ALM; 1	VAL; 1				16 (8–8)	15 (7–8)	14 (7–7)	1st (720)	1st (760)	1st (1480)	—N/a
2025	RUK; 2	IDR; 1	~~IDR~~; ~~C~~	~~ADH~~; ~~C~~	~~ADH~~; ~~C~~	BAK –	BAK –	WAT –	WAT –	VSC –	VSC –	DVR –	DVR –	BEI –	BEI –	ALM –	ALM –	LIV –	LIV –	2 (2–0)	2 (2–0)	1 (1–0)	13th (180)	– (–)	20th (180)	—N/a
2026	RUK; 6	RUK; 1	VSC; 1	VSC; 6	WAT; 1	NAN; 13	NAN; 8	~~ALM~~; ~~C~~	~~ALM~~; ~~C~~	~~SHA~~; ~~C~~	~~SHA~~; ~~C~~									7 (5–2)	3 (3–0)	3 (3–0)	1st (360)	6th (72)	2nd (432)	—N/a
Total																				89	46	26	(gold) x3	(gold) x2	(gold) x2	–

==== Race podiums ====
As of 12 March 2026

Event	1st	2nd	3rd	Total
Moguls	17	10	3	30
Dual moguls	9	3	4	16
Total	26	13	7	46

No	Season	Date	Location	Discipline	Result
1	2018–19	15 December 2018	(China) Thaiwoo	Moguls	Second
2	2018–19	18 January 2019	(United States) Lake Placid	Moguls	Winner
3	2018–19	26 January 2019	(Canada) Tremblant	Moguls	Second
4	2018–19	23 February 2019	(Japan) Tazawako	Moguls	Second
5	2018–19	24 January 2019	(Japan) Tazawako	Dual moguls	Third
6	2019–20	6 February 2020	(United States) Deer Valley	Moguls	Second
7	2019–20	22 February 2020	(Japan) Tazawako	Moguls	Third
8	2019–20	1 March 2020	(Kazakhstan) Shymbulak	Dual moguls	Second
9	2019–20	7 March 2020	(Russia) Krasnoyarsk	Dual moguls	Second
10	2020–21	4 December 2021	(Finland) Ruka	Moguls	Second
11	2020–21	11 December 2021	(Sweden) Idre Fjäll	Moguls	Third
12	2020–21	12 December 2021	(Sweden) Idre Fjäll	Dual moguls	Third
13	2020–21	17 December 2021	(France) Alpe d'Huez	Moguls	Winner
14	2020–21	18 December 2021	(France) Alpe d'Huez	Dual moguls	Winner
15	2020–21	8 January 2022	(Canada) Tremblant	Moguls	Second
16	2020–21	13 January 2022	(United States) Deer Valley	Moguls	Third
17	2020–21	14 January 2022	(United States) Deer Valley	Moguls	Second
18	2020–21	12 March 2022	(Italy) Chiesa in Valmalenco	Dual moguls	Winner
19	2020–21	18 March 2022	(France) Megève	Moguls	Second
20	2020–21	19 March 2022	(France) Megève	Dual moguls	Second
21	2022–23	3 December 2022	(Finland) Ruka	Moguls	Winner
22	2022–23	10 December 2022	(Sweden) Idre Fjäll	Moguls	Winner
23	2022–23	16 December 2022	(France) Alpe d'Huez	Moguls	Winner
24	2022–23	17 December 2022	(France) Alpe d'Huez	Dual moguls	Third
25	2022–23	21 January 2023	(Canada) Val Saint-Côme	Moguls	Second
26	2022–23	2 February 2023	(United States) Deer Valley	Moguls	Winner
27	2023–24	2 December 2023	(Finland) Ruka	Moguls	Winner
28	2023–24	8 December 2023	(Sweden) Idre Fjäll	Moguls	Winner
29	2023–24	9 December 2023	(Sweden) Idre Fjäll	Dual moguls	Third
30	2023–24	15 December 2023	(France) Alpe d'Huez	Moguls	Winner
31	2023–24	16 December 2023	(France) Alpe d'Huez	Dual moguls	Winner
32	2023–24	22 December 2023	(Georgia (country)) Bakuriani	Moguls	Winner
33	2023–24	23 December 2023	(Georgia (country)) Bakuriani	Dual moguls	Winner
34	2023–24	19 January 2023	(Canada) Val Saint-Côme	Moguls	Winner
35	2023–24	20 January 2023	(Canada) Val Saint-Côme	Dual moguls	Winner
36	2023–24	26 January 2023	(United States) Waterville Valley	Moguls	Winner
37	2023–24	27 January 2023	(United States) Waterville Valley	Dual moguls	Winner
38	2023–24	3 February 2023	(United States) Deer Valley	Dual moguls	Winner
39	2023–24	8 March 2023	(Kazakhstan) Almaty	Moguls	Winner
40	2023–24	9 March 2023	(Kazakhstan) Almaty	Dual moguls	Winner
41	2023–24	16 March 2023	(Italy) Chiesa in Valmalenco	Dual moguls	Winner
42	2024–25	30 November 2024	(Finland) Ruka	Moguls	Second
43	2024–25	6 December 2024	(Sweden) Idre Fjäll	Moguls	Winner
44	2025–26	8 December 2025	(Finland) Ruka	Moguls	Winner
45	2025–26	9 January 2026	(Canada) Val Saint-Côme	Moguls	Winner
46	2025–26	16 January 2026	(United States) Waterville Valley	Moguls	Winner
