= Freestyle skiing at the 2026 Winter Olympics – Women's moguls =

Women's moguls at the XXV Olympic Winter Games
- Freestyle skiing
- Venue: Livigno Aerials & Moguls Park, Valtellina
- Date: 10, 11 February 2026
- Winning points: 82.30

Medalists
1st place, gold medalist(s)		Elizabeth Lemley	United States
2nd place, silver medalist(s)		Jaelin Kauf	United States
3rd place, bronze medalist(s)		Perrine Laffont	France

The women's moguls competition in freestyle skiing at the 2026 Winter Olympics was held on 10 February 11:15‒15:10 (qualification 1) and 11 February 11:00‒15:25 (qualification 2 and final), at the Livigno Aerials & Moguls Park in Valtellina. Elizabeth Lemley of the United States won the event, her teammate Jaelin Kauf won the silver medal, replicating her 2022 performance, and Perrine Laffont of France won bronze. For Lemley, it was the first Olympic medal.

== Background ==
The 2022 champion, Jakara Anthony, qualified for the event, as did the silver medalist Jaelin Kauf. The bronze medalist, Anastasia Smirnova, was barred from international competitions after the Russian invasion of Ukraine. There were four events in 2025–26 FIS Freestyle Ski World Cup in moguls before the Olympics; Anthony won three of them and was leading the mogul standings, and Tess Johnson won another event. Perrine Laffont, the 2018 Olympic champion in moguls, was also the 2025 World champion.

The Italian skier Manuela Passaretta, who had already sustained an injury in the 2025–26 FIS Freestyle Ski World Cup opening race in Ruka, Finland suffered a bone contusion to her tibia during training in Livigno, which forced her to withdraw from the race.

== Results ==
=== Qualifications ===
==== Qualifying 1 ====
In the first qualifying round, the ten best athletes directly qualify for the final. The bottom twenty athletes go on to compete in the second qualification round.

Rank	Bib	Order	Name	Country	Time	Score			Total	Notes
Rank	Bib	Order	Name	Country	Time	Turns	Air	Time	Total	Notes
1	1	6	Jakara Anthony	Australia	25.59	48.3	15.44	17.91	81.65	QF
2	4	28	Elizabeth Lemley	United States	26.67	48.4	15.91	16.64	80.95	QF
3	3	29	Olivia Giaccio	United States	26.17	47.0	16.51	17.23	80.74	QF
4	11	19	Perrine Laffont	France	25.55	47.1	14.41	17.96	79.47	QF
5	6	1	Hinako Tomitaka	Japan	28.10	47.0	13.32	14.96	75.28	QF
6	9	30	Maïa Schwinghammer	Canada	28.24	45.6	14.50	14.80	74.90	QF
7	17	3	Haruka Nakao	Japan	28.71	45.9	14.57	14.24	74.71	QF
8	17	3	Laurianne Desmarais-Gilbert	Canada	27.69	45.5	13.19	15.44	74.13	QF
9	2	21	Tess Johnson	United States	27.36	44.2	13.76	15.83	73.79	QF
10	16	27	Camille Cabrol	France	27.25	44.00	13.11	15.96	73.07	QF
11	8	2	Avital Carroll	Austria	26.46	42.7	12.01	16.89	71.60	
12	5	4	Anastassiya Gorodko	Kazakhstan	26.95	42.0	12.67	16.31	70.98	
13	23	15	Ashley Koehler	Canada	27.51	44.5	10.55	15.65	70.70	
14	14	9	Yuliya Galysheva	Kazakhstan	27.63	40.2	13.89	15.51	69.60	
15	13	20	Jessica Linton	Canada	27.02	40.1	12.88	16.23	69.21	
16	20	23	Rino Yanagimoto	Japan	28.01	41.4	12.02	15.07	68.49	
17	21	14	Emma Bosco	Australia	28.02	40.6	10.93	15.05	66.58	
18	24	13	Makayla Gerken Schofield	Great Britain	28.67	41.1	10.99	14.29	66.38	
19	10	10	Hina Fujiki	Japan	27.31	37.2	12.80	15.89	65.89	
20	15	5	Ayaulym Amrenova	Kazakhstan	27.77	38.5	9.65	15.35	63.50	
21	30	26	Yun Shin-ee	South Korea	29.56	36.0	10.16	13.24	59.40	
22	22	8	Marie Duaux	France	30.54	35.2	11.71	12.09	59.00	
23	26	25	Katharina Ramsauer	Austria	28.47	33.1	11.30	14.53	58.93	
24	27	22	Yang Ya	China	30.52	32.7	12.78	12.12	57.60	
25	25	16	Malica Malherbe	South Africa	30.39	35.2	8.38	12.27	55.85	
26	28	12	Li Ruilin	China	30.93	32.8	9.02	11.63	53.45	
27	7	24	Jaelin Kauf	United States	24.88	23.6	11.03	18.75	53.38	
28	12	11	Charlotte Wilson	Australia	28.78	21.4	14.39	14.16	49.95	
29	19	18	Elis Lundholm	Sweden	38.27	0.3	8.75	3.00	12.05	
	29	7	Manuela Passaretta	Italy	Did not start					

==== Qualifying 2 ====
In the second qualifying round, the ten best athletes qualify for the final based on that athletes best score from either the athlete's first or second qualifying run. The bottom ten athletes are eliminated.

Rank	Bib	Order	Name	Country	Qual 1	Time	Score			Total	Best	Notes
Rank	Bib	Order	Name	Country	Qual 1	Time	Turns	Air	Time	Total	Best	Notes
1	12	8	Charlotte Wilson	Australia	49.95	26.60	46.8	14.27	16.72	77.79	77.79	QF
2	7	18	Jaelin Kauf	United States	53.38	26.35	46.3	13.86	17.02	77.18	77.18	QF
3	8	1	Avital Carroll	Austria	71.60	27.27	46.1	14.45	15.94	76.49	76.49	QF
4	20	17	Rino Yanagimoto	Japan	68.49	28.16	43.7	14.76	14.89	73.35	73.35	QF
5	14	6	Yuliya Galysheva	Kazakhstan	69.60	27.68	42.1	15.53	15.45	73.08	73.08	QF
6	13	15	Jessica Linton	Canada	69.21	27.41	44.7	12.42	15.77	72.89	72.89	QF
7	5	2	Anastassiya Gorodko	Kazakhstan	70.98	26.54	43.8	10.93	16.79	71.52	71.52	QF
8	23	12	Ashley Koehler	Canada	70.70	27.01	43.2	10.17	16.24	69.61	70.70	QF
9	10	7	Hina Fujiki	Japan	65.89	29.24	43.2	13.24	13.62	70.06	70.06	QF
10	15	3	Ayaulym Amrenova	Kazakhstan	63.50	27.96	43.8	10.05	15.13	68.98	68.98	QF
11	21	11	Emma Bosco	Australia	66.58	27.82	35.9	11.29	15.29	62.48	66.58	
12	24	10	Makayla Gerken Schofield	Great Britain	66.38	28.25	39.7	11.69	14.78	66.17	66.38	
13	22	5	Marie Duaux	France	59.00	30.39	40.3	12.56	12.27	65.13	65.13	
14	30	20	Yun Shin-ee	South Korea	59.40	28.57	38.7	11.35	14.41	64.46	64.46	
15	19	14	Elis Lundholm	Sweden	12.05	27.77	34.1	9.77	15.35	59.22	59.22	
16	26	19	Katharina Ramsauer	Austria	58.93	29.28	33.5	12.12	13.57	59.19	59.19	
17	25	13	Malica Malherbe	South Africa	55.85	30.05	37.5	8.69	12.67	58.86	58.86	
18	27	16	Yang Ya	China	57.60	30.59	32.6	13.09	12.03	57.72	57.72	
19	28	9	Li Ruilin	China	53.45	29.53	28.7	10.85	13.28	52.83	53.45	

=== Final ===
==== Final 1 ====
In the first final round, the eight best athletes qualify for the second final round. The bottom twelve athletes are eliminated.

Rank	Bib	Order	Name	Country	Time	Score			Total	Notes
Rank	Bib	Order	Name	Country	Time	Turns	Air	Time	Total	Notes
1	1	20	Jakara Anthony	Australia	24.71	48.1	16.91	18.95	83.96	QF
2	7	9	Jaelin Kauf	United States	24.96	47.0	14.48	18.65	80.13	QF
3	6	16	Hinako Tomitaka	Japan	26.90	46.8	16.25	16.37	79.42	QF
4	4	19	Elizabeth Lemley	United States	26.49	45.2	16.97	16.85	79.02	QF
5	12	10	Charlotte Wilson	Australia	25.93	45.8	15.07	17.51	78.38	QF
6	9	15	Maïa Schwinghammer	Canada	26.81	44.4	16.30	16.48	77.18	QF
7	8	8	Avital Carroll	Austria	27.11	45.2	15.07	16.12	76.39	QF
8	11	17	Perrine Laffont	France	25.97	46.1	12.65	17.46	76.21	QF
9	3	18	Olivia Giaccio	United States	25.73	41.9	16.16	17.75	75.81	
10	2	12	Tess Johnson	United States	26.57	45.4	13.15	16.76	75.31	
11	10	2	Hina Fujiki	Japan	26.98	43.2	13.76	16.28	73.24	
12	17	13	Laurianne Desmarais-Gilbert	Canada	27.99	45.0	12.56	15.09	72.49	
13	20	7	Rino Yanagimoto	Japan	27.27	42.3	14.25	15.94	72.49	
14	14	6	Yuliya Galysheva	Kazakhstan	26.92	41.0	14.99	16.35	72.34	
15	5	4	Anastassiya Gorodko	Kazakhstan	25.44	41.4	12.66	18.09	72.15	
16	23	3	Ashley Koehler	Canada	26.20	42.6	11.60	17.19	71.39	
17	18	14	Haruka Nakao	Japan	29.03	44.1	12.92	13.87	70.89	
18	15	1	Ayaulym Amrenova	Kazakhstan	27.52	40.2	12.63	15.64	68.47	
19	13	5	Jessica Linton	Canada	26.84	38.5	12.10	16.44	67.04	
20	16	11	Camille Cabrol	France	26.35	38.5	8.61	17.02	61.43	

==== Final 2 ====
The second final round will determine the medal winners amongst the final eight athletes.

Rank	Bib	Order	Name	Country	Time	Score			Total	Notes
Rank	Bib	Order	Name	Country	Time	Turns	Air	Time	Total	Notes
1st place, gold medalist(s)	4	5	Elizabeth Lemley	United States	25.81	47.3	17.35	17.65	82.30	
2nd place, silver medalist(s)	7	7	Jaelin Kauf	United States	25.11	47.3	14.99	18.48	80.77	
3rd place, bronze medalist(s)	11	1	Perrine Laffont	France	26.16	46.2	14.56	17.24	78.00	
4	6	6	Hinako Tomitaka	Japan	27.03	46.0	15.78	16.22	78.00	
5	9	3	Maïa Schwinghammer	Canada	26.42	45.6	15.07	16.94	77.61	
6	12	4	Charlotte Wilson	Australia	26.26	44.4	13.65	17.12	75.17	
7	8	2	Avital Carroll	Austria	27.06	42.7	13.01	16.18	71.89	
8	1	8	Jakara Anthony	Australia	26.69	27.9	16.29	16.62	60.81	
