= Emma Bosco =

Australian freestyle skier (born 2002)

Personal information
- Born: 18 December 2002 (age 23) Wahroonga, New South Wales, Australia

Sport
- Country: Australia
- Sport: Freestyle skiing
- Events: Moguls, Dual moguls
- Club: NSWIS (Senior); Perisher Winter Sports Club (Junior)

World Cup career
- Seasons: 2 (2025-2026)
- Indiv. starts: 11
- Indiv. podiums: 0
- Indiv. wins: 0
- Discipline titles: 0
Medal record
Women's freestyle skiing
Representing Australia
- Updated on 8 March 2026

Emma Bosco (born 18 December 2002) is an Australian freestyle skier, specialising in moguls. She represented Australia at the 2026 Winter Olympics and the FIS Freestyle Ski and Snowboarding World Championships 2025. She made her debut in the World Cup on 24 January 2025 and her best result at a World Cup event was 18th place in the moguls discipline.

== Career ==
=== Early career and setbacks ===
Bosco started her mogul journey from the prestigious Perisher Winter Sports Club that have produced Olympians like Matt Graham, earning a spot in the extended national mogul team before a long term knee injury struck in 2020. Bosco returned to competition in 2022 in the North American Cup, two years after her previous start.

=== 2024–current ===
Bosco continued to compete in second tier events and recorded her very first international win in April 2024 at Snowbird in an FIS Open event. She competed for UNSW at the 2025 Winter World University Games, finishing 15th in the moguls and 8th in the dual moguls. These results helped springboard her into more competitive international events, participating in her first World Cup event at Waterville Valley Resort on 24 January 2025, finishing 27th. Two months later, Bosco competed in the FIS Freestyle World Ski Championships at Engadin 2025 recording 22nd and 17th place finishes in the moguls and dual moguls respectively.

In December 2025, it was announced that Bosco was selected for the Freestyle Moguls National Development Team. Ahead of the 2025–26 season, Bosco was placed within the Top 40 World Rankings, and consistent finishes within the top 30 at Ruka and Val Saint–Côme secured her Olympic qualification alongside fellow UNSW moguls skiers Charlotte Wilson and George Murphy. At her debut Olympics, Bosco competed in both the moguls and the newly introduced dual moguls to the Winter Games. Bosco was ranked 17th after her first qualifying run however was knocked out of the Top 20 finals with her second run. In the dual moguls, Bosco defeated compatriot Charlotte Wilson in the Round of 32 before losing to eventual silver medalist Jaelin Kauf from the United States. The result placed Bosco 16th overall for the event.

== Personal life ==
Bosco is studying Mechanical Engineering (Honours) at UNSW.

== Results ==
=== Olympic results ===
As of 8 March 2026

Year	Age	Moguls	Dual Moguls
(Italy) 2026 Milano Cortina	23	21	16

=== World Championships ===
As of 8 March 2026

Year	Age	Moguls	Dual Moguls
(Switzerland) 2025 Engadin	22	22	17

=== World Cup ===
As of 8 March 2026

Season	Moguls					Dual Moguls					Overall Moguls				
Season	Events started	Pods	Wins	Points	Rank	Events started	Pods	Wins	Points	Rank	Events started	Pods	Wins	Points	Rank
2024–25	3/9	0	0	17	37	3/7	0	0	–	–	6	0	0	17	44
2025–26	4/5	0	0	29	28	1/2	0	0	9	31	5	0	0	38	30
