= Makayla Gerken Schofield =

British freestyle skier (born 1999)

Personal information
- Born: 4 June 1999 (age 26) Chelmsford, England

Sport
- Country: United Kingdom
- Sport: Freestyle skiing
- Event: Moguls
- Club: GB Snowsport

Makayla Gerken Schofield (born 4 June 1999) is a British freestyle skier who competes internationally.

She competed in the FIS Freestyle Ski and Snowboarding World Championships 2021, where she placed seventeenth in women's moguls, and thirteenth in women's dual moguls.

Gerken Schofield is pansexual and in 2021 helped her sport's governing body GB Snowsport to mark LGBT+ History Month.

== Results ==
=== Olympic Winter Games ===
| Year | Age | Moguls | Dual Moguls |
|---|---|---|---|
| (China) 2022 Beijing | 22 | 8 | —N/a |
| (Italy) 2026 Milano Cortina | 26 | 22 | 22 |

=== World Championships ===
| Year | Age | Moguls | Dual Moguls |
|---|---|---|---|
| (Spain) 2017 Sierra Nevada | 17 | 23 | 23 |
| (United States) 2019 Deer Valley | 19 | 11 | 14 |
| (Kazakhstan) 2021 Almaty | 21 | 17 | 13 |
| (Georgia (country)) 2023 Bakuriani | 23 | 9 | 6 |
| (Switzerland) 2025 Engadin | 25 | 23 | 27 |

=== World Cup ===
==== Season standings ====
| Season | Age | Overall Moguls | Moguls | Dual Moguls |
|---|---|---|---|---|
| 2019 | 24 | 19 | —N/a | |
| 2020 | 24 | 14 | —N/a | |
| 2021 | 24 | 12 | —N/a | |
| 2022 | 26 | 25 | 23 | 26 |
| 2023 | 27 | 9 | 8 | 11 |
| 2024 | 28 | 23 | 21 | 22 |
| 2025 | 29 | 26 | 30 | 24 |
