= Olivia Giaccio =

American freestyle skier (born 2000)

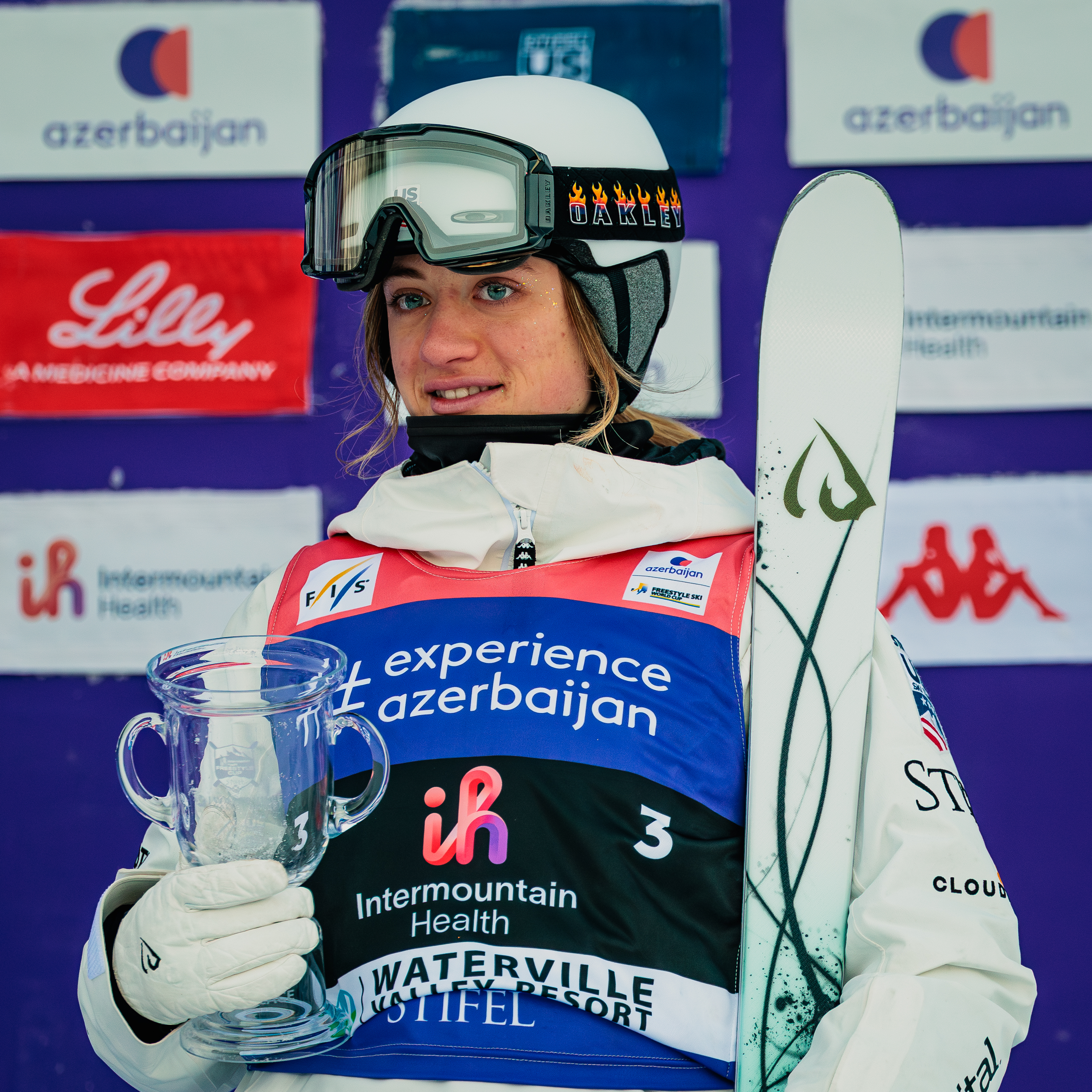
- Giaccio in 2026

Personal information
- Born: August 15, 2000 (age 26) Mount Kisco, New York, U.S.
- Height: 1.65 m (5 ft 5 in)
- Weight: 59 kg (130 lb)

Sport
- Country: United States
- Sport: Freestyle skiing
- Events: Moguls, Dual moguls
- Club: Steamboat Springs Winter Sports Club

Olivia Giaccio (born August 15, 2000) is an American freestyle skier who competed in the 2022 Winter Olympics in women's moguls where she finished 6th overall.

Competing in the 2026 Winter Olympics in Valtellina, she finished in third place in the first qualification round of the moguls with a score of 80.74 on February 10, 2026, qualifying her for the final.

== Personal life ==
She was an undergraduate student at Columbia University.

== World Cup titles ==
Season	
Season	Discipline
2025–26	Overall Moguls

== Results ==
=== Winter Olympic Games ===
Year	Age	Moguls	Dual Moguls
(China) 2022 Beijing	21	6	—N/a
(Italy) 2026 Milano Cortina	25	9	6

=== World Championships ===
Year	Age	Moguls	Dual Moguls
(Spain) 2017 Sierra Nevada	16	15	17
(United States) 2019 Deer Valley	18	25	20
(Georgia (country)) 2023 Bakuriani	22	12	9

=== World Cup ===
==== Season standings ====
Season	Age	Overall	Overall Moguls	Moguls	Dual Moguls
2016	15	167	35	—N/a	
2017	16	58	11	—N/a	
2018	17	64	12	—N/a	
2019	18	52	11	—N/a	
2020	19	158	38	—N/a	
2021	20	—N/a	26	—N/a	
2022	21	—N/a	4	4	10
2023	22	—N/a	7	5	7
2024	23	—N/a	3rd place, bronze medalist(s)	3rd place, bronze medalist(s)	3rd place, bronze medalist(s)
2025	24	—N/a	6	5	10
2026	25	—N/a	1st place, gold medalist(s)	2nd place, silver medalist(s)	2nd place, silver medalist(s)
