= Avital Carroll =

Austrian freestyle skier (born 1996)

Personal information
- Born: 24 April 1996 (age 30) New York City, U.S.

Skiing career
- Sport: Alpine skiing
- Club: Kitzbühler Ski Club
- Disciplines: Moguls, dual moguls
- World Cup debut: 10 January 2018

World Championships
- Teams: 1 – (2023)
- Medals: 3
Medal record
Women's freestyle skiing
Representing Austria
World Championships
Bronze medal – third place	2023 Bakuriani	Moguls
Bronze medal – third place	2023 Bakuriani	Dual moguls
Representing United States
Junior World Championships
Silver medal – second place	2015 Chiesa in Valmalenco	Moguls

Avital Carroll (née Shimko, born 24 April 1996) is an Austrian and former American mogul skier.

== Biography ==
Carroll had her first international success at the 2015 Junior World Championships, where she won the silver medal behind French racer Perrine Laffont and ahead of then teammate Jaelin Kauf.

On 7 June 2022, Carroll announced that she choose to competed under the Austrian flag. This was possible due to a new Austrian law, granting citizenship to descendants of displaced persons.

At the 2023 Snowboard World Championships, Carroll became the first Austrian since Margarita Marbler to win a medal in the moguls event.

== Personal life ==
Her grandmother Elfi Hendell was born in Vienna, her grandfather David Hendell in modern-day Croatia. They both fled to the United States after the Holocaust by ship (U.S.S Henry Gibbons) in 1944. On 7 September 2020, she married her husband, Bobby Carroll, who later became her coach. She competes under her husband's name.

== Results ==
=== Olympic Winter Games ===
Year	Age	Moguls	Dual Moguls
(Italy) 2026 Milano Cortina	26	7	10

=== World Championships results ===
- 2 medals – (2 bronze)

Year	Age	Moguls	Dual Moguls
(Georgia (country)) 2023 Bakuriani	26	3	3
(Switzerland) 2025 St. Moritz	28	17	28

=== Junior World Championships ===
- 1 medals – (1 silver)

Year	Age	Moguls	Dual Moguls
(Italy) 2015 Chiesa in Valmalenco	18	2	6
(Sweden) 2016 Åre	19	4	8
