= Haruka Nakao =

Japanese freestyle skier (born 2001)

Personal information
- Born: 19 April 2001 (age 25) Osaka, Japan

Sport
- Sport: Freestyle skiing
- Event: Moguls
Medal record
Women's freestyle skiing
Representing Japan
World University Games
Silver medal – second place	2025 Turin	Moguls
Junior World Championships
Silver medal – second place	2021 Krasnoyarsk	Dual moguls

Haruka Nakao (中尾春香, Nakao Haruka; born 19 April 2001) is a Japanese freestyle skier specializing in moguls. She represented Japan at the 2026 Winter Olympics.

== Career ==
Nakao competed at the 2021 FIS Freestyle Ski and Snowboarding Junior World Championships and won a silver medal in the dual moguls event.

In January 2025, Nakao represented Japan at the 2025 Winter World University Games and won a silver medal in the moguls event with a score of 76.29. In March 2025, she competed at the 2025 FIS Freestyle Ski World Championships in moguls and finished in sixth place.

In January 2026, she was selected to represent Japan at the 2026 Winter Olympics. During the moguls qualification she scored 74.71 and advanced to the finals.

== Results ==
=== Olympic Winter Games ===
Year	Age	Moguls	Dual Moguls
(Italy) 2026 Milano Cortina	24	17	2

=== World Championships ===
Year	Age	Moguls	Dual Moguls
(Georgia (country)) 2023 Bakuriani	21	13	13
(Switzerland) 2025 Engadin	23	6	14

=== World Cup ===
==== Season standings ====
Season	Age	Overall Moguls	Moguls	Dual Moguls
2022	20	24	19	36
2023	21	16	15	16
2024	22	14	17	13
2025	23	15	19	12
