= Katharina Ramsauer =

Austrian freestyle skier (born 1995)

Kathi Ramsauer
Personal information
- Full name: Katharina Ramsauer
- Born: 21 May 1995 (age 31) Hallein, Austria

Sport
- Country: Austria
- Sport: Freestyle skiing
- Club: USV Krispl-Gaißau
Medal record
Women's freestyle skiing
Representing Austria
Winter Universiade
Bronze medal – third place	2017 Almaty	Moguls
Bronze medal – third place	2017 Almaty	Dual moguls

Katharina Ramsauer (born 21 May 1995) is an Austrian freestyle skier. She competed in the 2022 and 2026 Winter Olympics.

== Career ==
Ramsauer began skiing in 2011. She won two bronze medals at the 2017 Winter Universiade. She finished 24th out of 30 competitors in the first qualifying round in the women's moguls event at the 2022 Winter Olympics before finishing 19th in the second qualifying round, failing to qualify for the finals.

== Personal life ==
Ramsauer attended HTL Braunau, where she received a Master's degree in sports and movement sciences and a Bachelor's degree in sports science.

== Results ==
=== Olympic Winter Games ===
Year	Age	Moguls	Dual Moguls
(China) 2022 Beijing	26	29	—N/a
(Italy) 2026 Milano Cortina	30	26	27

=== World Championships ===
Year	Age	Moguls	Dual Moguls
(Austria) 2015 Kreischberg	19	35	32
(Kazakhstan) 2021 Almaty	25	29	28
(Georgia (country)) 2023 Bakuriani	27	20	18

=== World Cup ===
==== Season standings ====
Season	Age	Overall	Moguls	Dual Moguls
2020	24	135	31	—N/a
2022	26	44	44	37
2023	27	22	23	22
2024	28	26	27	26
2025	29	24	23	20
