= Laurianne Desmarais-Gilbert =

Canadian freestyle skier (born 1997)

Personal information
- Born: June 11, 1997 (age 28) Brossard, Quebec, Canada

Sport
- Sport: Freestyle skiing
- Event: Moguls

Laurianne Desmarais-Gilbert (born June 11, 1997) is a Canadian freestyle skier specializing in moguls. She represented Canada at the 2026 Winter Olympics.

== Career ==
Desmarais-Gilbert represented Canada at the 2025 FIS Freestyle Ski World Championships in moguls and finished in fourth place.

In January 2026, she was selected to represent Canada at the 2026 Winter Olympics. During the moguls qualification she scored 74.13 and advanced to the finals. She finished in 12th place with a score of 72.65 in Final 1 on February 11, 2026.

== Results ==
=== Olympic Winter Games ===
Year	Age	Moguls	Dual Moguls
(Italy) 2026 Milano Cortina	28	12	2

=== World Championships ===
Year	Age	Moguls	Dual Moguls
(Georgia (country)) 2023 Bakuriani	25	11	10
(Switzerland) 2025 Engadin	27	4	10

=== World Cup ===
==== Season standings ====
Season	Age	Overall Moguls	Moguls	Dual Moguls
2019	21	43	—N/a	
2020	22	41	—N/a	
2022	24	39	40	32
2023	25	24	22	25
2024	26	18	19	21
2025	27	21	20	22
