= FIS Freestyle Ski and Snowboarding World Championships 2025 – Women's dual moguls =

Women's dual moguls at the FIS Freestyle Ski and Snowboarding World Championships 2025
- Location: Corviglia, Switzerland
- Dates: 21 March

Medalists
gold medal	Jaelin Kauf	United States
silver medal	Tess Johnson	United States
bronze medal	Anastassiya Gorodko	Kazakhstan

The Women's dual moguls competition at the FIS Freestyle Ski and Snowboarding World Championships 2025 was held on 21 March 2025.

== Results ==
=== Finals ===
Semifinals
(United States) Jaelin Kauf	23
(United States) Kylie Kariotis	12
(Kazakhstan) Anastassiya Gorodko	16
(United States) Tess Johnson	19

Final
(United States) Jaelin Kauf	21
(United States) Tess Johnson	14
Third place
(United States) Kylie Kariotis	13
(Kazakhstan) Anastassiya Gorodko	22

=== Top half ===
==== Section 1 ====
Round of 64
37	(Ukraine) Yuliana Kisil	8
29	(Canada) Ashley Koehler	27

Round of 32
1	(United States) Jaelin Kauf	21
29	(Canada) Ashley Koehler	14
28	(Austria) Avital Carroll	DNF
15	(France) Camille Cabrol	35
6	(Kazakhstan) Yuliya Galysheva	DNS
22	(Canada) Jessica Linton	35
20	(South Africa) Malica Malherbe	DNF
17	(Canada) Laurianne Desmarais-Gilbert	35

Round of 16
1	(United States) Jaelin Kauf	19
15	(France) Camille Cabrol	16
22	(Canada) Jessica Linton	18
17	(Canada) Laurianne Desmarais-Gilbert	17

Quarterfinals
1	(United States) Jaelin Kauf	31
22	(Canada) Jessica Linton	4

==== Section 2 ====
Round of 64
14	(Sweden) Moa Gustafson	30
33	(China) Hao Liyun	5
26	(South Korea) Yun Shin-he	26
30	(China) Ma Zhuoni	9

Round of 32
8	(Canada) Maïa Schwinghammer	21
14	(Sweden) Moa Gustafson	14
21	(Italy) Manuela Passaretta	6
10	(United States) Kylie Kariotis	29
11	(Japan) Haruka Nakao	23
25	(Sweden) Nicolina Stenkula	12
26	(South Korea) Yun Shin-he	DNF
3	(Japan) Rino Yanagimoto	35

Round of 16
8	(Canada) Maïa Schwinghammer	16
10	(United States) Kylie Kariotis	19
11	(Japan) Haruka Nakao	11
3	(Japan) Rino Yanagimoto	24

Quarterfinals
10	(United States) Kylie Kariotis	35
3	(Japan) Rino Yanagimoto	DNF

=== Bottom half ===
==== Section 3 ====
Round of 64
31	(Italy) Sofia Carla Timpone	24
34	(Republic of Ireland) Claire Dooley	11

Round of 32
7	(Japan) Hinako Tomitaka	35
31	(Italy) Sofia Carla Timpone	0
32	(Kazakhstan) Yuliya Feklistova	14
9	(United States) Kasey Hogg	21
13	(Australia) Charlotte Wilson	22
27	(China) Yang Ya	13
35	(Australia) Emma Bosco	15.5
4	(Kazakhstan) Anastassiya Gorodko	19.5

Round of 16
7	(Japan) Hinako Tomitaka	17
9	(United States) Kasey Hogg	18
13	(Australia) Charlotte Wilson	DNF
4	(Kazakhstan) Anastassiya Gorodko	35

Quarterfinals
9	(United States) Kasey Hogg	15
4	(Kazakhstan) Anastassiya Gorodko	20

==== Section 4 ====
Round of 64
36	(United Kingdom) Cali Carr
24	(Germany) Annika Merz

Round of 32
5	(United States) Tess Johnson	28
18	(China) Li Ruilin	7
23	(Germany) Hanna Weese	DNS
16	(France) Marie Duaux	35
12	(Japan) Hina Fujiki	35
19	(United Kingdom) Makayla Gerken Schofield	DNF
36	(United Kingdom) Cali Carr	2
2	(France) Perrine Laffont	33

Round of 16
5	(United States) Tess Johnson	35
16	(France) Marie Duaux	DNF
12	(Japan) Hina Fujiki	14
2	(France) Perrine Laffont	21

Quarterfinals
5	(United States) Tess Johnson	18
2	(France) Perrine Laffont	17
