= Elizabeth Lemley =

American freestyle skier (born 2006)

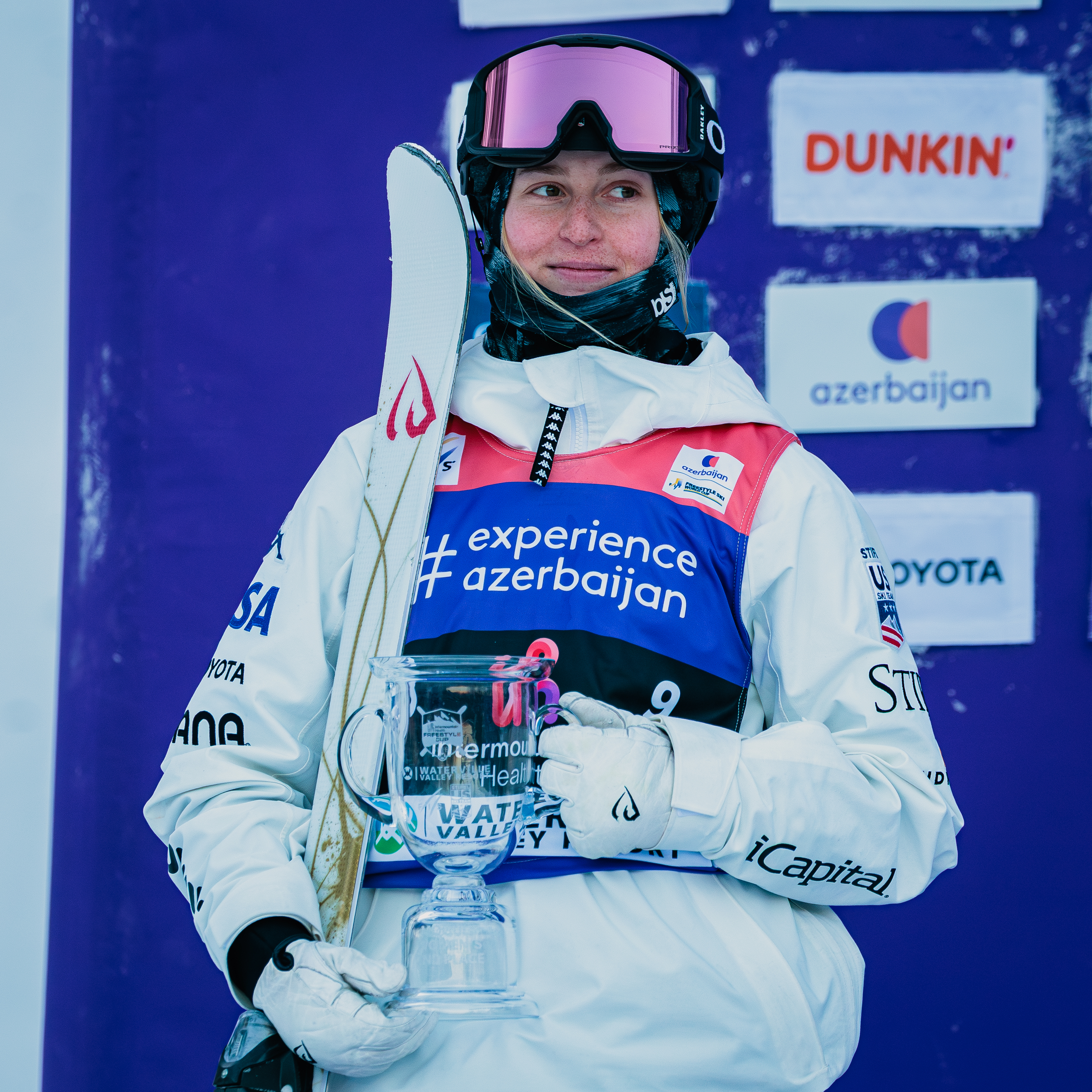
- Lemley in 2026

Personal information
- Born: January 22, 2006 (age 20) Vail, Colorado, U.S.

Sport
- Country: United States
- Sport: Freestyle skiing
- Event: Moguls
- Coached by: John Dowling
Medal record
Women's freestyle skiing
Representing the United States
Olympic Games
Gold medal – first place	2026 Milano Cortina	Moguls
Bronze medal – third place	2026 Milano Cortina	Dual moguls
Youth Olympic Games
Gold medal – first place	2024 Gangwon	Dual moguls
Gold medal – first place	2024 Gangwon	Team dual moguls
Junior World Championships
Gold medal – first place	2022 Chiesa in Valmalenco	Moguls
Silver medal – second place	2022 Chiesa in Valmalenco	Dual moguls

Elizabeth Lemley (born January 22, 2006) is an American freestyle skier specializing in moguls. She is the 2026 Winter Olympic champion in moguls and bronze medalist in dual moguls.

== Career ==
Lemley made her World Cup debut at 15 years old during the 2021–22 FIS Freestyle Ski World Cup and was one of the youngest on the circuit. She finished the season with two top-ten finishes and was named the 2022 Rookie of the Year. She competed at the 2022 FIS Freestyle Junior World Ski Championships and won a gold medal in the moguls and a silver medal in the dual moguls events.

During the 2022–23 FIS Freestyle Ski World Cup she earned her first career World Cup win on December 11, 2022, in her tenth career World Cup start. She finished the season with three podium finishes and in fifth place in the overall standings. During the 2023–24 FIS Freestyle Ski World Cup she had two podium finishes.

Lemley represented the United States at the 2024 Winter Youth Olympics and won a gold medal in the dual moguls and the mixed team dual moguls events. She missed the 2024–25 FIS Freestyle Ski World Cup due to an anterior cruciate ligament injury. During the opening race of the 2025–26 FIS Freestyle Ski World Cup she finished in second place in the dual moguls, behind Jaelin Kauf.

In January 2026, Lemley was selected to represent the United States at the 2026 Winter Olympics. During the moguls qualification she finished in second place with a score of 80.95 and advanced to the finals. During the finals she won a gold medal with a score 82.30 in what was considered an upset. She also won a bronze medal in the inaugural dual moguls event three days later.

== Personal life ==
Lemley's father is a pilot, and she became a pilot as well by earning a license to fly four-seaters and prop planes at 17 years old. Lemley was accepted at Oberlin College (her father's alma mater) for the class of 2029, but deferred her enrollment by a year until fall 2026. She is the first athlete affiliated with the college to compete at the Winter Olympics.

== Results ==
=== Olympic Winter Games ===
Year	Age	Moguls	Dual Moguls
(Italy) 2026 Milano Cortina	20	1	3

=== World Championships ===
Year	Age	Moguls	Dual Moguls
(Georgia (country)) 2023 Bakuriani	17	6	5

=== World Cup ===
==== Season standings ====
Season	Age	Overall Moguls	Moguls	Dual Moguls
2022	16	10	9	16
2023	17	5	6	4
2024	18	10	9	10
