= Maïa Schwinghammer =

Canadian freestyle skier (born 2001)

Personal information
- Born: September 14, 2001 (age 25) Saskatoon, Saskatchewan, Canada

Sport
- Sport: Freestyle skiing
- Event: Moguls
Medal record
Women's freestyle skiing
Representing Canada
World Championships
Bronze medal – third place	2025 St. Moritz	Moguls

Maïa Schwinghammer (born September 14, 2001) is a Canadian mogul skier. She represented Canada at the 2026 Winter Olympics.

== Early life ==
Schwinghammer's first experience of skiing came on Christopher Lake while being pulled behind a snowmobile. Her parents ran her local skiing hill, Mount Blackstrap, during her childhood. She joined the Saskatchewan provincial team at the age of 15, and the national team when she was 17.

Schwinghammer attended Holy Cross High School in Saskatoon, Saskatchewan

== Career ==
During the 2024–25 FIS Freestyle Ski World Cup, Schwinghammer earned her first career World Cup victory on January 31, 2025. She finished the World Cup in third place with 456 points.

Schwinghammer represented Canada at the 2025 FIS Freestyle Ski World Championships and won a bronze medal in the moguls event with 74.92 points.

In January 2026, she was selected to represent Canada at the 2026 Winter Olympics. During the moguls qualification she finished in sixth place with a score of 74.90 and advanced to the finals. She was the only Canadian to qualify for the second final round, in which she finished in fifth place with a score of 77.61. On February 14, 2026, she also competed in the inaugural dual moguls event, and was eliminated by Perrine Laffont in the 1/8 finals.

== Results ==
=== Olympic Winter Games ===
Year	Age	Moguls	Dual Moguls
(Italy) 2026 Milano Cortina	24	11	5

=== World Championships ===
Year	Age	Moguls	Dual Moguls
(United States) 2019 Deer Valley	17	18	–
(Georgia (country)) 2023 Bakuriani	21	5	8
(Switzerland) 2025 Engadin	23	3	11

=== World Cup ===
==== Season standings ====
Season	Age	Overall Moguls	Moguls	Dual Moguls
2019	17	23	—N/a	
2020	18	23	—N/a	
2021	19	21	—N/a	
2022	20	15	20	9
2023	21	14	13	15
2024	22	9	11	5
2025	23	4	8	3rd place, bronze medalist(s)
