= Elis Lundholm =

Swedish freestyle skier (born 2002)

Personal information
- Full name: Elis Lundholm
- Born: 10 July 2002 (age 24)

Sport
- Country: Sweden
- Sport: Freestyle skiing
- Club: Värmdö FMT

Elis Lundholm (born 10 July 2002) is a Swedish mogul skier. He debuted in the 2024 World Cup, where he placed 18th. He has won four Swedish championship medals and represented Sweden at the 2026 Winter Olympics. Lundholm is a transgender man and the first openly trans athlete to compete in a Winter Olympics; as of 2026 he competes in the women's category.

== Early and personal life ==
Lundholm was born on 10 July 2002 and is from Värmdö Municipality, near Stockholm, where he skis with Värmdö FMT. Lundholm is a transgender man and the first openly trans athlete to compete in a Winter Olympics. Under International Ski and Snowboard Federation and International Olympic Committee (IOC) policies, as of 2026 he is eligible to compete in the women's category.

== Career ==
In 2024, Lundholm came second in dual moguls and third in moguls in the Swedish National Championships; he came third in moguls at the Championships in 2023 and 2025. He debuted in Ski World Cup events in 2024, finishing 18th.

Lundholm's participation at the 2026 Winter Olympics occurred during a period in which the IOC was increasingly restricting participation of transgender female athletes. He has noted that, within skiing, he has not received direct hate, but is aware of online abuse and the potential for more of this coming with the higher-profile competition. Lundholm will be helped to clean up online hate on his social media during the Olympics by the IOC's AI scanner. Heavy noted that Lundholm had largely avoided controversy prior to the Olympics due to his decision to remain eligible for and compete in the women's competition. The 2026 Winter Olympics are set to be the last IOC event before universal guidelines on transgender athletes' participation are introduced. Fredrik Joulamo, sports director and team manager at the Swedish Olympic Committee, expressed his full support to Lundholm.

Russian sports media targeted Lundholm with transphobic reporting, while the NBCUniversal commentary of his event consistently misgendered Lundholm and was removed from replays. During the moguls qualification rounds in Valtellina on 10 and 11 February 2026, he finished with a score of 12.05 in the first round and 59.22 in the second round, finishing in 25th place in qualification round 2.

== Results ==
=== Olympic Winter Games ===
Year	Age	Moguls	Dual Moguls
(Italy) 2026 Milano Cortina	23	25	27

=== World Cup ===
==== Season standings ====
Season	Age	Overall	Moguls	Dual Moguls
2025	22	57	50	–

== See also ==
- Sweden at the 2026 Winter Olympics
