= Charlotte Wilson (skier) =

Australian freestyle skier (born 2005)

Personal information
- Born: 15 February 2005 (age 21) St Leonards, New South Wales, Australia

Sport
- Sport: Freestyle skiing
- Event: Moguls

Charlotte Wilson (born 15 February 2005) is an Australian freestyle skier specializing in moguls.

== Career ==
During the final race of the 2024–25 FIS Freestyle Ski World Cup on 12 March 2025, Wilson earned her first career World Cup victory in dual moguls. The day before she was named the FIS World Cup Mogul Skiing Rookie of the Year.

In January 2026, she was selected to represent Australia at the 2026 Winter Olympics. During the second qualifying moguls round she scored 77.79 and advanced to the finals. During the finals she finished in sixth place with a score of 75.17.

== Personal life ==
Her younger sister, Abbey, is an Olympic snowboarder.

== Results ==
=== Olympic Winter Games ===
Year	Age	Moguls	Dual Moguls
(Italy) 2026 Milano Cortina	21	6	22

=== World Championships ===
Year	Age	Moguls	Dual Moguls
(Switzerland) 2025 Engadin	20	7	15

=== World Cup ===
==== Season standings ====
Season	Age	Overall	Moguls	Dual Moguls
2025	20	12	14	14
