= Rino Yanagimoto =

Japanese freestyle skier (born 2000)

Personal information
- Born: 13 December 2000 (age 25) Aichi, Japan

Sport
- Sport: Freestyle skiing
- Event: Moguls

Rino Yanagimoto (柳本理乃, Yanagimoto Rino; born 13 December 2000) is a Japanese freestyle skier specializing in moguls. She represented Japan at the 2026 Winter Olympics.

== Career ==
During the 2021–22 FIS Freestyle Ski World Cup, she earned her first career World Cup podium on 12 December 2021, finishing in second place in the moguls event. During the 2023–24 FIS Freestyle Ski World Cup, she earned her first career World Cup podium of the season on 8 December 2023, finishing in second place in the moguls event. The next day, she finished second in the dual moguls event.

During the 2023 FIS Freestyle Ski World Championships she finished in fourth place in the moguls event with a score of 79.67. In April 2024, she was diagnosed with cerebrospinal fluid hypovolemia. On 1 December 2025, one week before the first World Cup competition of the 2025–26 season she fell while practicing and broke her right collarbone. In January 2026, she was selected to represent Japan at the 2026 Winter Olympics. During the second qualifying moguls round she scored 73.35 and advanced to the finals.

== Results ==
=== Olympic Winter Games ===
Year	Age	Moguls	Dual Moguls
(Italy) 2026 Milano Cortina	25	13	22

=== World Championships ===
Year	Age	Moguls	Dual Moguls
(Georgia (country)) 2023 Bakuriani	23	4	7
(Switzerland) 2025 Engadin	25	11	8

=== World Cup ===
==== Season standings ====
Season	Age	Overall	Moguls	Dual Moguls
2019	24	162	39	—N/a
2020	24	132	29	—N/a
2021	24	17	—N/a	—N/a
2022	26	9	10	11
2023	27	6	5	7
2024	28	8	7	9
2025	29	5	9	3rd place, bronze medalist(s)
