= FIS Freestyle Ski and Snowboarding World Championships 2025 – Women's moguls =

Women's moguls at the FIS Freestyle Ski and Snowboarding World Championships 2025
- Location: Corviglia, Switzerland
- Dates: 18–19 March
- Competitors: 37 from 16 nations
- Winning points: 77.92

Medalists
| gold medal | Perrine Laffont | France |
| silver medal | Hinako Tomitaka | Japan |
| bronze medal | Maïa Schwinghammer | Canada |

The women's moguls competition at the FIS Freestyle Ski and Snowboarding World Championships 2025 was held on 18 and 19 March 2025.

== Qualification ==
The qualification was started at 09:45. The best 20 skiers qualified for the final.

| Rank | Bib | Start order | Name | Country | Q1 | Q2 | Notes |
|---|---|---|---|---|---|---|---|
| 1 | 1 | 3 | Jaelin Kauf | United States | 75.77 | | Q |
| 2 | 8 | 1 | Rino Yanagimoto | Japan | 72.42 | | Q |
| 3 | 2 | 22 | Perrine Laffont | France | 72.37 | | Q |
| 4 | 3 | 12 | Maïa Schwinghammer | Canada | 71.09 | | Q |
| 5 | 14 | 10 | Haruka Nakao | Japan | 69.05 | | Q |
| 6 | 12 | 18 | Charlotte Wilson | Australia | 69.02 | | Q |
| 7 | 4 | 19 | Tess Johnson | United States | 68.85 | | Q |
| 8 | 5 | 25 | Hinako Tomitaka | Japan | 67.53 | | Q |
| 9 | 6 | 8 | Yuliya Galysheva | Kazakhstan | 66.76 | | Q |
| 10 | 23 | 7 | Hanna Weese | Germany | 66.51 | | Q |
| 11 | 9 | 20 | Camille Cabrol | France | DNF | 70.75 | Q |
| 12 | 15 | 11 | Laurianne Desmarais-Gilbert | Canada | 62.78 | 70.05 | Q |
| 13 | 16 | 28 | Marie Duaux | France | 63.56 | 66.56 | Q |
| 14 | 13 | 24 | Hina Fujiki | Japan | 59.42 | 66.47 | Q |
| 15 | 10 | 21 | Anastassiya Gorodko | Kazakhstan | 59.01 | 64.78 | Q |
| 16 | 17 | 27 | Kylie Kariotis | United States | 64.74 | 64.06 | Q |
| 17 | 7 | 30 | Kasey Hogg | United States | 64.33 | 64.27 | Q |
| 18 | 22 | 23 | Ashley Koehler | Canada | 61.90 | 63.73 | Q |
| 19 | 20 | 15 | Moa Gustafsson | Sweden | 58.42 | 63.45 | Q |
| 20 | 19 | 13 | Avital Carroll | Austria | 63.39 | DNF | Q |
| 21 | 21 | 6 | Jessica Linton | Canada | 59.57 | 63.27 | |
| 22 | 30 | 16 | Emma Bosco | Australia | 52.95 | 61.88 | |
| 23 | 24 | 14 | Makayla Gerken Schofield | Great Britain | DNF | 58.93 | |
| 24 | 35 | 36 | Yuliya Feklistova | Kazakhstan | 56.53 | 53.37 | |
| 25 | 27 | 2 | Li Ruilin | China | 52.85 | 55.80 | |
| 26 | 25 | 5 | Nicolina Stenkula | Sweden | 51.82 | 55.58 | |
| 27 | 33 | 4 | Malica Malherbe | South Africa | 54.49 | 46.52 | |
| 28 | 29 | 9 | Cali Carr | Great Britain | 47.48 | 54.03 | |
| 29 | 31 | 17 | Yang Ya | China | 50.02 | 50.82 | |
| 30 | 28 | 29 | Yun Shin-ee | South Korea | 50.42 | 9.76 | |
| 31 | 36 | 32 | Manuela Passaretta | Italy | 45.47 | 49.84 | |
| 32 | 37 | 35 | Hao Liyun | China | 40.34 | 47.17 | |
| 33 | 38 | 34 | Claire Dooley | Ireland | 46.90 | 45.50 | |
| 34 | 39 | 31 | Sofia Carla Timpone | Italy | 43.09 | 39.67 | |
| 35 | 40 | 37 | Yuliana Kisil | Ukraine | 37.65 | 42.82 | |
| 36 | 34 | 33 | Ma Zhuoni | China | 41.61 | 35.80 | |
| 37 | 32 | 26 | Annika Merz | Germany | 37.01 | 31.94 | |

== Final ==
The final was started at 11:30.

| Rank | Bib | Name | Country | Final 1 | Final 2 |
|---|---|---|---|---|---|
| 1st place, gold medalist(s) | 2 | Perrine Laffont | France | 76.23 | 77.92 |
| 2nd place, silver medalist(s) | 5 | Hinako Tomitaka | Japan | 73.34 | 75.15 |
| 3rd place, bronze medalist(s) | 3 | Maïa Schwinghammer | Canada | 75.57 | 74.92 |
| 4 | 15 | Laurianne Desmarais-Gilbert | Canada | 73.32 | 69.64 |
| 5 | 9 | Camille Cabrol | France | 73.17 | 68.44 |
| 6 | 14 | Haruka Nakao | Japan | 74.28 | 67.57 |
| 7 | 12 | Charlotte Wilson | Australia | 74.06 | 54.27 |
| 8 | 1 | Jaelin Kauf | United States | 75.70 | 45.11 |
| 9 | 16 | Marie Duaux | France | 71.71 | — |
| 10 | 10 | Anastassiya Gorodko | Kazakhstan | 71.57 | — |
| 11 | 8 | Rino Yanagimoto | Japan | 71.30 | — |
| 12 | 4 | Tess Johnson | United States | 71.21 | — |
| 13 | 13 | Hina Fujiki | Japan | 71.06 | — |
| 14 | 6 | Yuliya Galysheva | Kazakhstan | 70.41 | — |
| 15 | 17 | Kylie Kariotis | United States | 69.29 | — |
| 16 | 7 | Kasey Hogg | United States | 69.04 | — |
| 17 | 19 | Avital Carroll | Austria | 66.12 | — |
| 18 | 22 | Ashley Koehler | Canada | 64.14 | — |
| 19 | 23 | Hanna Weese | Germany | 53.53 | — |
| 20 | 20 | Moa Gustafsson | Sweden | 49.28 | — |
