= 2023–24 FIS Freestyle Ski World Cup =

Freestyle skiing competitive season

Discipline	Men	Women
Ski Cross	(Sweden) David Mobärg (1)	(Canada) Marielle Thompson (4)
Overall Moguls	(Canada) Mikaël Kingsbury (12)	(Australia) Jakara Anthony (2)
Moguls	(Japan) Ikuma Horishima (1)	(Australia) Jakara Anthony (2)
Dual Moguls	(Canada) Mikaël Kingsbury (3)	(Australia) Jakara Anthony (2)
Aerials	(China) Qi Guangpu (3)	(Australia) Danielle Scott (2)
Park & Pipe Overall	(United States) Alex Ferreira (1)	(Switzerland) Mathilde Gremaud (1)
Halfpipe	(United States) Alex Ferreira (2)	(China) Eileen Gu (2)
Slopestyle	(United States) Mac Forehand (2)	(Switzerland) Mathilde Gremaud (1)
Big Air	(United States) Alexander Hall (1)	(Switzerland) Mathilde Gremaud (1)
- Nations Cup overall: Canada (15)

Competition
Edition	52nd	52nd
Locations	30	30
Individual	53	52
Team	1	1
Cancelled	3	4

The 2023/24 FIS Freestyle Ski World Cup, organized by the International Ski Federation (FIS), is the 52nd World Cup in freestyle skiing for men and women.

The season started on 19 October 2023 in Chur, Switzerland and concluded on 24 March 2024 in Silvaplana, Switzerland.

This season includes six disciplines: moguls, aerials, ski cross, halfpipe, slopestyle and big air.

== Men ==
=== Calendar ===
==== Ski Cross (SX) ====
#	Date	Place	Winner	Second	Third	Discipline leader	R.
1	7 December 2023	(France) Val Thorens	(Austria) Tristan Takats	(United States) Tyler Wallasch	(Switzerland) Romain Detraz	(Austria) Tristan Takats	
2	8 December 2023	(France) Val Thorens	(Canada) Jared Schmidt	(Sweden) David Mobärg	(Austria) Johannes Rohrweck	(Canada) Jared Schmidt	
3	12 December 2023	(Switzerland) Arosa	(Canada) Jared Schmidt	(Canada) Reece Howden	(Sweden) David Mobärg	(Canada) Jared Schmidt	
4	21 December 2023	(Italy) Innichen	(Canada) Jared Schmidt	(France) Nicolas Raffort	(France) Youri Duplessis Kergomard	(Canada) Jared Schmidt	
5	22 December 2023	(Italy) Innichen	(France) Terence Tchiknavorian	(Germany) Tim Hronek	(Germany) Florian Wilmsmann	(Canada) Jared Schmidt	
6	20 January 2024	(Canada) Nakiska	(Canada) Reece Howden	(France) Terence Tchiknavorian	(Switzerland) Alex Fiva	(Canada) Jared Schmidt	
7	21 January 2024	(Canada) Nakiska	(Switzerland) Jonas Lenherr	(Germany) Florian Wilmsmann	(France) Youri Duplessis Kergomard	(Canada) Jared Schmidt	
8	28 January 2024	(Switzerland) St. Moritz	(Italy) Simone Deromedis	(Switzerland) Alex Fiva	(France) Youri Duplessis Kergomard	(Canada) Jared Schmidt	
9	2 February 2024	(Italy) Alleghe	(Sweden) Erik Mobärg	(Switzerland) Alex Fiva	(Germany) Niklas Bachsleitner	(Canada) Reece Howden	
10	3 February 2024	(Italy) Alleghe	(Canada) Reece Howden	(Germany) Florian Wilmsmann	(Austria) Johannes Aujesky	(Canada) Reece Howden	
11	10 February 2024	(Georgia (country)) Bakuriani	(Sweden) David Mobärg	(Germany) Florian Wilmsmann	(Switzerland) Alex Fiva	(Canada) Reece Howden	
12	11 February 2024	(Georgia (country)) Bakuriani	(Italy) Simone Deromedis	(Sweden) David Mobärg	(Switzerland) Tobias Baur	(Switzerland) Alex Fiva	
13	24 February 2024	(Austria) Reiteralm	(Sweden) Erik Mobärg	(Switzerland) Jonas Lenherr	(France) Melvin Tchiknavorian	(Canada) Reece Howden	
14	25 February 2024	(Austria) Reiteralm	(France) Youri Duplessis Kergomard	(Italy) Simone Deromedis	(France) Terence Tchiknavorian	(Canada) Reece Howden	
15	2 March 2024	(Germany) Oberwiesenthal	cancelled				
16	3 March 2024	(Germany) Oberwiesenthal	cancelled				
17	16 March 2024	(Switzerland) Veysonnaz	(Sweden) David Mobärg	(Switzerland) Alex Fiva	(Germany) Florian Wilmsmann	(Switzerland) Alex Fiva	
18	22 March 2024	(Sweden) Idre Fjäll	(Sweden) David Mobärg	(Italy) Simone Deromedis	(Canada) Reece Howden	(Sweden) David Mobärg	
19	23 March 2024	(Sweden) Idre Fjäll	(Sweden) David Mobärg	(Canada) Reece Howden	(Sweden) Erik Mobärg	(Sweden) David Mobärg	

==== Moguls (MO) ====
#	Date	Place	Winner	Second	Third	Discipline leader	R.
1	2 December 2023	(Finland) Ruka	(Japan) Ikuma Horishima	(Sweden) Walter Wallberg	(Canada) Mikaël Kingsbury	(Japan) Ikuma Horishima	
2	8 December 2023	(Sweden) Idre Fjäll	(Canada) Mikaël Kingsbury	(United States) Nick Page	(Sweden) Filip Gravenfors	(Canada) Mikaël Kingsbury	
3	15 December 2023	(France) Alpe d'Huez	(Canada) Mikaël Kingsbury	(Canada) Elliot Vaillancourt	(Japan) Ikuma Horishima	(Canada) Mikaël Kingsbury	
4	22 December 2023	(Georgia (country)) Bakuriani	(Japan) Ikuma Horishima	(Sweden) Filip Gravenfors	(Canada) Mikaël Kingsbury	(Canada) Mikaël Kingsbury	
5	19 January 2024	(Canada) Val Saint-Côme	(Sweden) Walter Wallberg	(Canada) Elliot Vaillancourt	(Sweden) Filip Gravenfors	(Japan) Ikuma Horishima	
6	26 January 2024	(United States) Waterville	(Japan) Ikuma Horishima	(Australia) Cooper Woods	(Canada) Mikaël Kingsbury	(Japan) Ikuma Horishima	
7	1 February 2024	(United States) Deer Valley	(Canada) Mikaël Kingsbury	(Japan) Ikuma Horishima	(Sweden) Filip Gravenfors	(Japan) Ikuma Horishima	
8	8 March 2024	(Kazakhstan) Almaty	(Canada) Mikaël Kingsbury	(Japan) Ikuma Horishima	(Australia) Matt Graham	(Japan) Ikuma Horishima	

==== Dual Moguls (DM) ====
#	Date	Place	Winner	Second	Third	Discipline leader	R.
1	9 December 2023	(Sweden) Idre Fjäll	(Canada) Mikaël Kingsbury	(Sweden) Rasmus Stegfeldt	(Japan) Ikuma Horishima	(Canada) Mikaël Kingsbury	
2	16 December 2023	(France) Alpe d'Huez	(Sweden) Walter Wallberg	(Sweden) Rasmus Stegfeldt	(Canada) Mikaël Kingsbury	(Canada) Mikaël Kingsbury	
3	23 December 2023	(Georgia (country)) Bakuriani	(Canada) Mikaël Kingsbury	(Japan) Ikuma Horishima	(United States) Nick Page	(Canada) Mikaël Kingsbury	
4	20 January 2024	(Canada) Val Saint-Côme	(Canada) Mikaël Kingsbury	(Sweden) Filip Gravenfors	(Australia) Matt Graham	(Canada) Mikaël Kingsbury	
5	27 January 2024	(United States) Waterville	(Canada) Mikaël Kingsbury	(Japan) Ikuma Horishima	(Sweden) Walter Wallberg	(Canada) Mikaël Kingsbury	
6	3 February 2024	(United States) Deer Valley	(Japan) Ikuma Horishima	(France) Benjamin Cavet	(United States) Dylan Marcellini	(Canada) Mikaël Kingsbury	
7	9 March 2024	(Kazakhstan) Almaty	(Canada) Mikaël Kingsbury	(Kazakhstan) Pavel Kolmakov	(United States) Landon Wendler	(Canada) Mikaël Kingsbury	
8	16 March 2024	(Italy) Valmalenco	(Canada) Mikaël Kingsbury	(Japan) Takuya Shimakawa	(United States) Nick Page	(Canada) Mikaël Kingsbury	

==== Aerials (AE) ====
#	Date	Place	Winner	Second	Third	Discipline leader	R.
1	3 December 2023	(Finland) Ruka	(China) Qi Guangpu	(Switzerland) Pirmin Werner	(Ukraine) Dmytro Kotovskyi	(China) Qi Guangpu	
2	16 December 2023	(China) Changchun	(Switzerland) Pirmin Werner	(United States) Christopher Lillis	(China) Li Tianma	(Switzerland) Pirmin Werner	
3	2 February 2024	(United States) Deer Valley	(Canada) Alexandre Duchaine	(United States) Connor Curran	(China) Qi Guangpu	(China) Qi Guangpu	
4	10 February 2024	(Canada) Lac-Beauport	(China) Qi Guangpu	(China) Wang Xindi	(Canada) Émile Nadeau	(China) Qi Guangpu	
5	11 February 2024	(Canada) Lac-Beauport	(China) Zhang Yifan	(China) Wang Xindi	(Switzerland) Noé Roth	(China) Qi Guangpu	
6	10 March 2024	(Kazakhstan) Almaty	(China) Qi Guangpu	(China) Wang Guochen	(United States) Christopher Lillis	(China) Qi Guangpu	

==== Halfpipe (HP) ====
#	Date	Place	Winner	Second	Third	Discipline leader	R.
1	9 December 2023	(China) Secret Garden	(United States) Alex Ferreira	(New Zealand) Luke Harrold	(United States) Hunter Hess	(United States) Alex Ferreira	
2	15 December 2023	(United States) Copper Mountain	(United States) Alex Ferreira	(United States) Hunter Hess	(United States) Birk Irving	(United States) Alex Ferreira	
3	2 February 2024	(United States) Mammoth Mountain	(United States) Alex Ferreira	(United States) Hunter Hess	(United States) Nick Goepper	(United States) Alex Ferreira	
4	15 February 2024	(Canada) Calgary	(United States) Alex Ferreira	(Canada) Brendan Mackay	(Finland) Jon Sallinen	(United States) Alex Ferreira	
5	17 February 2024	(Canada) Calgary	(United States) Alex Ferreira	(Finland) Jon Sallinen	(South Korea) Lee Seung-hun	(United States) Alex Ferreira	

==== Slopestyle (SS) ====
#	Date	Place	Winner	Second	Third	Discipline leader	R.
1	23 November 2023	(Austria) Stubai	(Canada) Evan McEachran	(United States) Mac Forehand	(United States) Alexander Hall	(Canada) Evan McEachran	
	13 January 2024	(France) Font Romeu	cancelled				
2	21 January 2024	(Switzerland) Laax	(Norway) Birk Ruud	(United States) Mac Forehand	(Canada) Max Moffatt	(United States) Mac Forehand	
3	3 February 2024	(United States) Mammoth Mountain	(United States) Alexander Hall	(United States) Colby Stevenson	(Switzerland) Andri Ragettli	(United States) Alexander Hall	
4	16 March 2024	(France) Tignes	(United States) Mac Forehand	(Norway) Tormod Frostad	(United States) Konnor Ralph	(United States) Mac Forehand	
5	24 March 2024	(Switzerland) Silvaplana	(Switzerland) Andri Ragettli	(Austria) Lukas Müllauer	(New Zealand) Luca Harrington	(United States) Mac Forehand	

==== Big Air (BA) ====
#	Date	Place	Winner	Second	Third	Discipline leader	R.
1	19 October 2023	(Switzerland) Chur	(Canada) Dylan Deschamps	(Austria) Daniel Bacher	(Norway) Birk Ruud	(Canada) Dylan Deschamps	
2	2 December 2023	(China) Beijing	(United States) Alexander Hall	(Canada) Édouard Therriault	(Switzerland) Andri Ragettli	(United States) Alexander Hall	
3	16 December 2023	(United States) Copper Mountain	(United States) Mac Forehand	(Italy) Miro Tabanelli	(Norway) Birk Ruud	(Italy) Miro Tabanelli	
4	15 March 2024	(France) Tignes	(United States) Alexander Hall	(Norway) Leo Landroe	(Switzerland) Andri Ragettli	(United States) Alexander Hall	

=== Standings ===
==== Ski Cross ====
Rank	after all 17 events	Points
	(Sweden) David Mobärg	780
2	(Canada) Reece Howden	721
3	(Switzerland) Alex Fiva	698
4	(Germany) Florian Wilmsmann	642
5	(Sweden) Erik Mobärg	612

==== Overall Moguls ====
Rank	after all 16 events	Points
	(Canada) Mikaël Kingsbury	1300
2	(Japan) Ikuma Horishima	982
3	(Sweden) Filip Gravenfors	705
4	(Sweden) Walter Wallberg	568
5	(United States) Nick Page	541

==== Moguls ====
Rank	after all 8 events	Points
	(Japan) Ikuma Horishima	610
2	(Canada) Mikaël Kingsbury	600
3	(Sweden) Filip Gravenfors	361
4	(Sweden) Walter Wallberg	343
5	(Canada) Elliot Vaillancourt	236

==== Dual Moguls ====
Rank	after all 8 events	Points
	(Canada) Mikaël Kingsbury	700
2	(Japan) Ikuma Horishima	372
3	(Sweden) Rasmus Stegfeldt	361
4	(Sweden) Filip Gravenfors	344
5	(United States) Nick Page	308

==== Aerials ====
Rank	after all 6 events	Points
	(China) Qi Guangpu	440
2	(Switzerland) Pirmin Werner	300
3	(United States) Christopher Lillis	298
4	(China) Wang Xindi	285
5	(China) Zhang Yifan	276

==== Park & Pipe Overall (HP/SS/BA) ====
Rank	after all 14 events	Points
	(United States) Alex Ferreira	500
2	(United States) Alexander Hall	460
3	(United States) Mac Forehand	455
4	(Switzerland) Andri Ragettli	380
5	(Norway) Birk Ruud	332

==== Halfpipe ====
Rank	after all 5 events	Points
	(United States) Alex Ferreira	500
2	(United States) Hunter Hess	265
3	(Finland) Jon Sallinen	230
4	(South Korea) Seung Hun Lee	177
5	(United States) Nick Goepper	155

==== Slopestyle ====
Rank	after all 5 events	Points
	(United States) Mac Forehand	310
2	(United States) Alexander Hall	260
3	(Switzerland) Andri Ragettli	255
4	(Norway) Birk Ruud	194
5	(United States) Konnor Ralph	154

==== Big Air ====
Rank	after all 4 events	Points
	(United States) Alexander Hall	236
2	(Switzerland) Andri Ragettli	196
3	(Italy) Miro Tabanelli	162
4	(Norway) Birk Ruud	160
5	(United States) Mac Forehand	136

== Women ==
=== Calendar ===
==== Ski Cross (SX) ====
#	Date	Place	Winner	Second	Third	Discipline leader	R.
1	7 December 2023	(France) Val Thorens	(Sweden) Sandra Näslund	(France) Marielle Berger Sabbatel	(Switzerland) Fanny Smith	(Sweden) Sandra Näslund	
2	8 December 2023	(France) Val Thorens	(Germany) Daniela Maier	(Canada) Brittany Phelan	(France) Marielle Berger Sabbatel	(Sweden) Sandra Näslund	
3	12 December 2023	(Switzerland) Arosa	(Canada) Hannah Schmidt	(France) Marielle Berger Sabbatel (Austria) Christina Foedermayr (Canada) Marielle Thompson		(France) Marielle Berger Sabbatel	
4	21 December 2023	(Italy) Innichen	(Sweden) Sandra Näslund	(Switzerland) Fanny Smith	(Canada) Hannah Schmidt	(Sweden) Sandra Näslund	
5	22 December 2023	(Italy) Innichen	(Switzerland) Sixtine Cousin	(France) Marielle Berger Sabbatel	(Sweden) Sandra Näslund	(Sweden) Sandra Näslund	
6	20 January 2024	(Canada) Nakiska	(Canada) Hannah Schmidt	(Canada) Marielle Thompson	(Switzerland) Fanny Smith	(France) Marielle Berger Sabbatel	
7	21 January 2024	(Canada) Nakiska	(Canada) Hannah Schmidt	(France) Marielle Berger Sabbatel	(Canada) Brittany Phelan	(France) Marielle Berger Sabbatel	
8	28 January 2024	(Switzerland) St. Moritz	(Canada) Marielle Thompson	(Switzerland) Fanny Smith	(Canada) Hannah Schmidt	(Canada) Hannah Schmidt	
9	2 February 2024	(Italy) Alleghe	(Canada) India Sherret	(Switzerland) Saskja Lack	(Switzerland) Talina Gantenbein	(Canada) Hannah Schmidt	
10	3 February 2024	(Italy) Alleghe	(Canada) Marielle Thompson	(Canada) Brittany Phelan	(France) Marielle Berger Sabbatel	(Canada) Hannah Schmidt	
11	10 February 2024	(Georgia (country)) Bakuriani	(Canada) Marielle Thompson	(Canada) Brittany Phelan	(France) Marielle Berger Sabbatel	(Canada) Marielle Thompson	
12	11 February 2024	(Georgia (country)) Bakuriani	(Canada) Marielle Thompson	(France) Marielle Berger Sabbatel	(Switzerland) Talina Gantenbein	(Canada) Marielle Thompson	
13	24 February 2024	(Austria) Reiteralm	cancelled				
14	25 February 2024	(Austria) Reiteralm	(Canada) Brittany Phelan	(France) Marielle Berger Sabbatel	(Switzerland) Margaux Dumont (Switzerland) Talina Gantenbein	(Canada) Marielle Thompson	
15	2 March 2024	(Germany) Oberwiesenthal	cancelled				
16	3 March 2024	(Germany) Oberwiesenthal	cancelled				
17	16 March 2024	(Switzerland) Veysonnaz	(Canada) Marielle Thompson	(Canada) Brittany Phelan	(Canada) India Sherret	(Canada) Marielle Thompson	
18	22 March 2024	(Sweden) Idre Fjäll	(Canada) Brittany Phelan	(Canada) India Sherret	(Switzerland) Saskja Lack	(Canada) Marielle Thompson	
19	23 March 2024	(Sweden) Idre Fjäll	(Canada) Marielle Thompson	(France) Marielle Berger Sabbatel	(Canada) Brittany Phelan	(Canada) Marielle Thompson	

==== Moguls (MO) ====
#	Date	Place	Winner	Second	Third	Discipline leader	R.
1	2 December 2023	(Finland) Ruka	(Australia) Jakara Anthony	(United States) Elizabeth Lemley	(United States) Olivia Giaccio	(Australia) Jakara Anthony	
2	8 December 2023	(Sweden) Idre Fjäll	(Australia) Jakara Anthony	(Japan) Rino Yanagimoto	(United States) Olivia Giaccio	(Australia) Jakara Anthony	
3	15 December 2023	(France) Alpe d'Huez	(Australia) Jakara Anthony	(United States) Jaelin Kauf	(United States) Olivia Giaccio	(Australia) Jakara Anthony	
4	22 December 2023	(Georgia (country)) Bakuriani	(Australia) Jakara Anthony	(Japan) Rino Yanagimoto	(United States) Hannah Soar	(Australia) Jakara Anthony	
5	19 January 2024	(Canada) Val Saint-Côme	(Australia) Jakara Anthony	(United States) Jaelin Kauf	(Japan) Hinako Tomitaka	(Australia) Jakara Anthony	
6	26 January 2024	(United States) Waterville	(Australia) Jakara Anthony	(United States) Jaelin Kauf	(United States) Hannah Soar	(Australia) Jakara Anthony	
7	1 February 2024	(United States) Deer Valley	(United States) Olivia Giaccio	(United States) Jaelin Kauf	(Japan) Hinako Tomitaka	(Australia) Jakara Anthony	
8	8 March 2024	(Kazakhstan) Almaty	(Australia) Jakara Anthony	(United States) Alli Macuga	(United States) Hannah Soar	(Australia) Jakara Anthony	

==== Dual Moguls (DM) ====
#	Date	Place	Winner	Second	Third	Discipline leader	R.
1	9 December 2023	(Sweden) Idre Fjäll	(United States) Jaelin Kauf	(Japan) Rino Yanagimoto	(Australia) Jakara Anthony	(United States) Jaelin Kauf	
2	16 December 2023	(France) Alpe d'Huez	(Australia) Jakara Anthony	(United States) Olivia Giaccio	(United States) Alli Macuga	(Australia) Jakara Anthony	
3	23 December 2023	(Georgia (country)) Bakuriani	(Australia) Jakara Anthony	(Canada) Maïa Schwinghammer	(United States) Jaelin Kauf	(Australia) Jakara Anthony	
4	20 January 2024	(Canada) Val Saint-Côme	(Australia) Jakara Anthony	(United States) Jaelin Kauf	(United States) Olivia Giaccio	(Australia) Jakara Anthony	
5	27 January 2024	(United States) Waterville	(Australia) Jakara Anthony	(United States) Jaelin Kauf	(United States) Olivia Giaccio	(Australia) Jakara Anthony	
6	3 February 2024	(United States) Deer Valley	(Australia) Jakara Anthony	(United States) Jaelin Kauf	(United States) Olivia Giaccio	(Australia) Jakara Anthony	
7	9 March 2024	(Kazakhstan) Almaty	(Australia) Jakara Anthony	(United States) Jaelin Kauf	(United States) Olivia Giaccio	(Australia) Jakara Anthony	
8	16 March 2024	(Italy) Valmalenco	(Australia) Jakara Anthony	(United States) Jaelin Kauf	(United States) Elizabeth Lemley	(Australia) Jakara Anthony	

==== Aerials (AE) ====
#	Date	Place	Winner	Second	Third	Discipline leader	R.
1	3 December 2023	(Finland) Ruka	(Canada) Marion Thénault	(Australia) Danielle Scott	(Kazakhstan) Zhanbota Aldabergenova	(Canada) Marion Thénault	
2	16 December 2023	(China) Changchun	(United States) Winter Vinecki	(China) Kong Fanyu	(Australia) Laura Peel	(United States) Winter Vinecki	
3	2 February 2024	(United States) Deer Valley	(United States) Winter Vinecki	(Australia) Danielle Scott	(Australia) Abbey Willcox	(United States) Winter Vinecki	
4	10 February 2024	(Canada) Lac-Beauport	(United States) Karenna Elliott	(Australia) Danielle Scott	(Canada) Marion Thénault	(Australia) Danielle Scott	
5	11 February 2024	(Canada) Lac-Beauport	(United States) Winter Vinecki	(China) Chen Meiting	(Australia) Danielle Scott	(United States) Winter Vinecki	
6	10 March 2024	(Kazakhstan) Almaty	(Canada) Marion Thénault	(Australia) Danielle Scott	(China) Kong Fanyu	(Australia) Danielle Scott	

==== Halfpipe (HP) ====
#	Date	Place	Winner	Second	Third	Discipline leader	R.
1	9 December 2023	(China) Secret Garden	(China) Eileen Gu	(United States) Hanna Faulhaber	(Canada) Amy Fraser	(China) Eileen Gu	
2	15 December 2023	(United States) Copper Mountain	(China) Eileen Gu	(United States) Hanna Faulhaber	(United Kingdom) Zoe Atkin	(China) Eileen Gu	
3	2 February 2024	(United States) Mammoth Mountain	(Canada) Amy Fraser	(China) Eileen Gu	(United Kingdom) Zoe Atkin	(China) Eileen Gu	
4	15 February 2024	(Canada) Calgary	(China) Eileen Gu	(Canada) Amy Fraser	(United Kingdom) Zoe Atkin	(China) Eileen Gu	
5	17 February 2024	(Canada) Calgary	(China) Eileen Gu	(United Kingdom) Zoe Atkin	(United States) Svea Irving	(China) Eileen Gu	

==== Slopestyle (SS) ====
#	Date	Place	Winner	Second	Third	Discipline leader	R.
1	23 November 2023	(Austria) Stubai	(Switzerland) Mathilde Gremaud	(France) Tess Ledeux	(New Zealand) Ruby Star Andrews	(Switzerland) Mathilde Gremaud	
	13 January 2024	(France) Font Romeu	cancelled				
2	21 January 2024	(Switzerland) Laax	(Switzerland) Mathilde Gremaud	(China) Eileen Gu	(United States) Jay Riccomini	(Switzerland) Mathilde Gremaud	
3	3 February 2024	(United States) Mammoth Mountain	(Switzerland) Mathilde Gremaud	(United States) Eleanor Andrews	(United States) Jay Riccomini	(Switzerland) Mathilde Gremaud	
4	16 March 2024	(France) Tignes	(France) Tess Ledeux	(Switzerland) Mathilde Gremaud	(Canada) Olivia Asselin	(Switzerland) Mathilde Gremaud	
5	24 March 2024	(Switzerland) Silvaplana	(France) Tess Ledeux	(Switzerland) Mathilde Gremaud	(United States) Jay Riccomini	(Switzerland) Mathilde Gremaud	

==== Big Air (BA) ====
#	Date	Place	Winner	Second	Third	Discipline leader	R.
1	19 October 2023	(Switzerland) Chur	(Switzerland) Mathilde Gremaud	(France) Tess Ledeux	(Switzerland) Sarah Höfflin	(Switzerland) Mathilde Gremaud	
2	2 December 2023	(China) Beijing	(Switzerland) Mathilde Gremaud	(United Kingdom) Kirsty Muir	(Italy) Flora Tabanelli	(Switzerland) Mathilde Gremaud	
3	16 December 2023	(United States) Copper Mountain	(France) Tess Ledeux	(Switzerland) Mathilde Gremaud	(United Kingdom) Kirsty Muir	(Switzerland) Mathilde Gremaud	
4	15 March 2024	(France) Tignes	(Switzerland) Mathilde Gremaud	(China) Liu Mengting	(Italy) Flora Tabanelli	(Switzerland) Mathilde Gremaud	

=== Standings ===
==== Ski Cross ====
Rank	after all 16 events	Points
	(Canada) Marielle Thompson	1077
2	(France) Marielle Berger Sabbatel	990
3	(Canada) Brittany Phelan	934
4	(Canada) Hannah Schmidt	663
5	(Switzerland) Talina Gantenbein	635

==== Overall Moguls ====
Rank	after all 16 events	Points
	(Australia) Jakara Anthony	1480
2	(United States) Jaelin Kauf	1064
3	(United States) Olivia Giaccio	882
4	(United States) Hannah Soar	717
5	(United States) Alli Macuga	615

==== Moguls ====
Rank	after all 8 events	Points
	(Australia) Jakara Anthony	720
2	(United States) Jaelin Kauf	500
3	(United States) Olivia Giaccio	427
4	(United States) Hannah Soar	406
5	(Japan) Hinako Tomitaka	325

==== Dual Moguls ====
Rank	after all 8 events	Points
	(Australia) Jakara Anthony	760
2	(United States) Jaelin Kauf	564
3	(United States) Olivia Giaccio	455
4	(United States) Hannah Soar	311
5	(Canada) Maïa Schwinghammer	304

==== Aerials ====
Rank	after all 6 events	Points
	(Australia) Danielle Scott	420
2	(United States) Winter Vinecki	378
3	(Canada) Marion Thénault	311
4	(China) Chen Meiting	278
5	(United States) Kaila Kuhn	227

==== Park & Pipe Overall (HP/SS/BA) ====
Rank	after all 14 events	Points
	(Switzerland) Mathilde Gremaud	600
2	(China) Eileen Gu	560
3	(France) Tess Ledeux	496
4	(Canada) Amy Fraser	335
5	(Italy) Flora Tabanelli	270

==== Halfpipe ====
Rank	after all 5 events	Points
	(China) Eileen Gu	400
2	(Canada) Amy Fraser	290
3	(United Kingdom) Zoe Atkin	260
4	(United States) Riley Jacobs	185
5	(United States) Svea Irving	182

==== Slopestyle ====
Rank	after all 5 events	Points
	(Switzerland) Mathilde Gremaud	380
2	(France) Tess Ledeux	316
3	(United States) Jay Riccomini	209
4	(New Zealand) Ruby Andrews	186
5	(Switzerland) Sarah Höfflin	165

==== Big Air ====
Rank	after all 4 events	Points
	(Switzerland) Mathilde Gremaud	380
2	(France) Tess Ledeux	248
3	(Italy) Flora Tabanelli	189
4	(Norway) Sandra Eie	160
5	(United Kingdom) Kirsty Muir	140

== Team ==
=== Team Aerials (AET) ===
#	Date	Place	Winner	Second	Third	R.
1	17 December 2023	(China) Changchun	United States I Winter Vinecki; Christopher Lillis; Quinn Dehlinger	China II Chen Meiting; Wang Xindi; Li Tianma	China I Kong Fanyu; Zhang Yifan; Qi Guangpu	

== Nations Cup ==
=== Overall ===
Rank	after all 106 events	Points
	Canada	8983
2	United States	8125
3	Switzerland	5737
4	France	4548
5	Sweden	4032

== Podium table by nation ==
Table showing the World Cup podium places (gold–1st place, silver–2nd place, bronze–3rd place) by the countries represented by the athletes.

Rank	Nation	Gold	Silver	Bronze	Total
1	Canada	33	15	15	63
2	United States	17	24	27	68
3	Australia	14	5	6	25
4	Switzerland	10	11	16	37
5	Sweden	10	7	7	24
6	China	8	9	4	21
7	France	5	12	8	25
8	Japan	4	8	4	16
9	Italy	2	3	2	7
10	Germany	1	4	3	8
11	Austria	1	3	2	6
12	Norway	1	2	2	5
13	Great Britain	0	2	4	6
14	New Zealand	0	1	2	3
15	Finland	0	1	1	2
15	Kazakhstan	0	1	1	2
17	South Korea	0	0	1	1
17	Ukraine	0	0	1	1
Totals (18 entries)		106	108	106	320
