= Anastassiya Gorodko =

Kazakhstani freestyle skier (born 2005)

Personal information
- Native name: Анастасия Андреевна Городко
- Nationality: Kazakh
- Born: 14 May 2005 (age 21) Oskemen, Kazakhstan

Sport
- Country: Kazakhstan
- Sport: Freestyle skiing
- Event: Moguls
Medal record
Women's freestyle skiing
Representing Kazakhstan
World Championships
Bronze medal – third place	2021 Almaty	Dual moguls
Bronze medal – third place	2025 Engadin	Dual moguls
FISU World University Games
Gold medal – first place	2025 Turin	Moguls
Gold medal – first place	2025 Turin	Dual moguls

Anastassiya Andreyevna Gorodko (Kazakh: Анастасия Андреевна Городко; born 14 May 2005) is a Kazakh freestyle skier.

She participated at the Dual moguls at the FIS Freestyle Ski and Snowboarding World Championships 2021, winning a medal.
