= Hannah Soar =

American freestyle skier

Personal information
- Born: June 4, 1999 (age 25); Somers, Connecticut, U.S.
- Home town: Killington, Vermont, U.S.

Sport
- Country: United States
- Sport: Freestyle skiing
- Event: Moguls
- Club: Killington Mountain School

Hannah Soar (born June 4, 1999) is an American freestyle skier who competes internationally.

She competed in the FIS Freestyle Ski and Snowboarding World Championships 2021, where she placed tenth in women's ski moguls.

She competed at the 2022 Winter Olympics.
