= Jaelin Kauf =

American freestyle skier (born 1996)

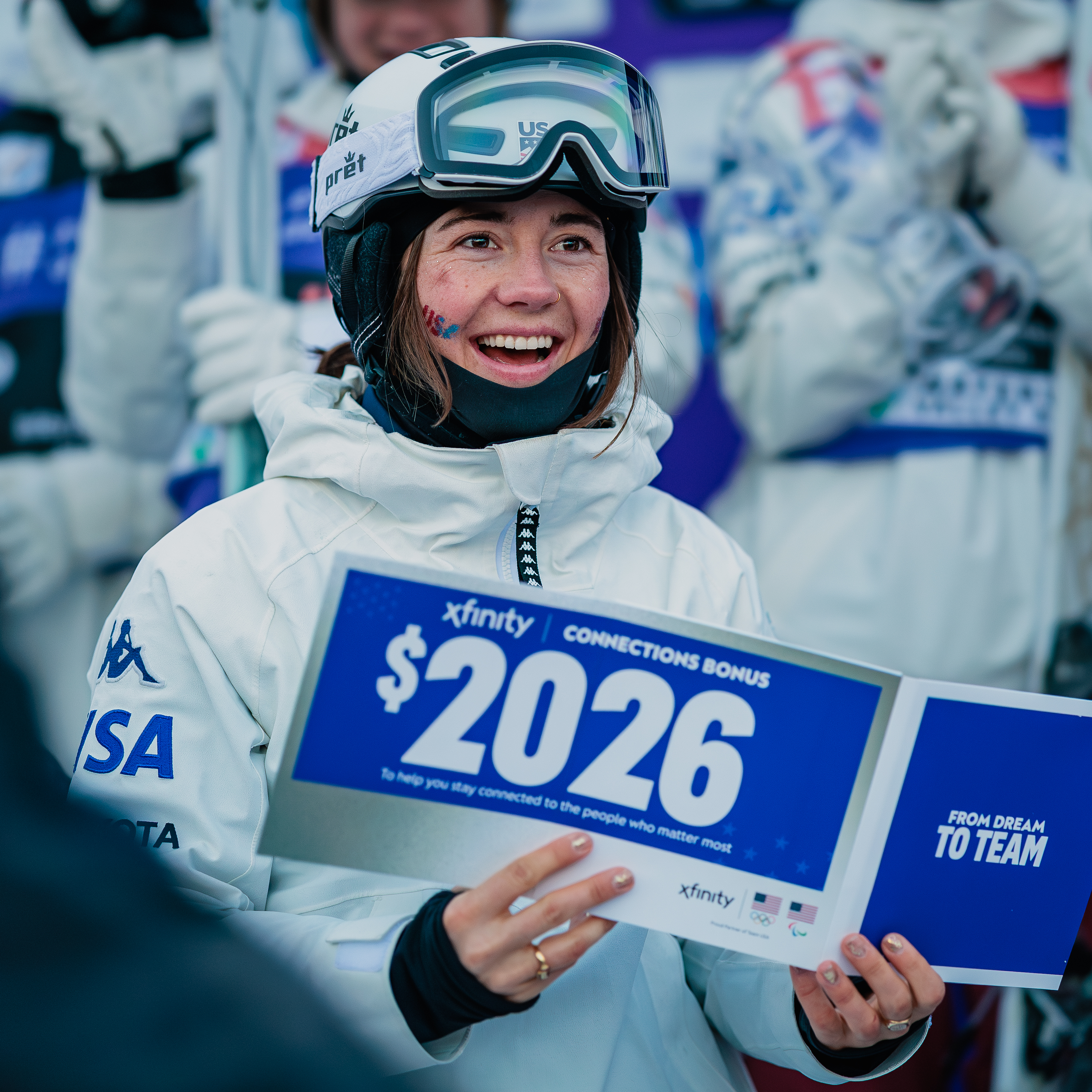
- Jaelin Kauf receives her official invite to compete for Team USA at the 2026 Winter Olympics

Personal information
- Full name: Jaelin Charlotte Kauf
- Born: September 26, 1996 (age 29) Vail, Colorado, U.S.
- Home town: Alta, Wyoming, U.S.
- Height: 5 ft 4 in (1.63 m)
- Weight: 134 lb (61 kg)

Sport
- Country: United States
- Sport: Freestyle skiing
- Event: Dual moguls
- Club: Steamboat Springs Winter Sports Club
Medal record
Women's freestyle skiing
Representing the United States
Olympic Games
Silver medal – second place	2022 Beijing	Moguls
Silver medal – second place	2026 Milano Cortina	Moguls
Silver medal – second place	2026 Milano Cortina	Dual moguls
World Championships
Gold medal – first place	2025 Engadin	Dual moguls
Silver medal – second place	2019 Utah	Dual moguls
Silver medal – second place	2023 Bakuriani	Moguls
Silver medal – second place	2023 Bakuriani	Dual moguls
Bronze medal – third place	2017 Sierra Nevada	Dual moguls

Jaelin Charlotte Kauf (born September 26, 1996) is an American freestyle skier specializing in moguls. She won a silver medal at the 2022 Winter Olympics and two silver medals at the 2026 Winter Olympics.

== Career ==
She competed for the United States at the FIS Freestyle Ski and Snowboarding World Championships 2017 in Sierra Nevada, Spain, where she won a bronze medal in dual moguls. She won a silver at the 2019 World Championships in dual moguls.

Ranked No. 1 in the world going in, Kauf qualified for the 2018 Winter Olympics in Pyeongchang, South Korea where she was among the favorites to medal. However, she finished seventh there and did not make the medal final.

Representing Team USA at the 2022 Beijing Winter Olympics, Kauf won the silver medal in Olympic freestyle moguls.

Kauf competed in the 2026 Winter Olympics at the Livigno Aerials and Moguls Park, in both the moguls and the dual moguls events, the latter of which was making its Olympic debut. In the first round of the moguls qualification, she finished with the quickest time (24.88s) but only in 27th place with a score of 53.38. She improved to 77.18 the next day in the second qualification round and advanced to the final. During the final on February 11, 2026, she won a silver medal with a score of 80.77. She also won a silver medal in the inaugural dual moguls event on February 14, 2026.

== World Cup titles ==
Season	
Season	Discipline
2024–25	Overall Moguls, Moguls, Dual Moguls
2025–26	Dual Moguls

== Results ==
=== Winter Olympic Games ===
Year	Age	Moguls	Dual Moguls
(South Korea) 2018 Pyeongchang	21	7	—N/a
(China) 2022 Beijing	25	2	—N/a
(Italy) 2026 Milano Cortina	29	2	2

=== World Championships ===
Year	Age	Moguls	Dual Moguls
(Spain) 2017 Sierra Nevada	20	21	3
(United States) 2019 Deer Valley	22	6	2
(Kazakhstan) 2021 Almaty	24	8	12
(Georgia (country)) 2023 Bakuriani	26	2	2
(Switzerland) 2025 Engadin	28	8	1

=== World Cup ===
==== Season standings ====
Season	Age	Overall Moguls	Moguls	Dual Moguls
2016	19	14	—N/a	
2017	20	7	—N/a	
2018	21	2nd place, silver medalist(s)	—N/a	
2019	22	2nd place, silver medalist(s)	—N/a	
2020	23	3rd place, bronze medalist(s)	—N/a	
2021	24	5	—N/a	
2022	25	7	16	4
2023	26	4	3rd place, bronze medalist(s)	3rd place, bronze medalist(s)
2024	27	2nd place, silver medalist(s)	2nd place, silver medalist(s)	2nd place, silver medalist(s)
2025	28	1st place, gold medalist(s)	1st place, gold medalist(s)	1st place, gold medalist(s)
2026	29	4	7	1st place, gold medalist(s)
