= Ayaulym Amrenova =

Kazakhstani freestyle skier (born 2001)

Personal information
- Native name: Аяулым Серікқызы Әмренова
- Born: 30 November 2001 (age 24) Aktobe, Kazakhstan
- Height: 1.68 m (5 ft 6 in)

Sport
- Country: Kazakhstan
- Sport: Freestyle skiing
Medal record
Women's freestyle skiing
Representing Kazakhstan
FISU World University Games
Silver medal – second place	2025 Turin	Dual moguls

Aiaulym Serıkqyzy Ämrenova (Note: Often transliterated as Ayaulym Serikovna Amrenova through a Russified Romanization of Аяулым Сериковна Амренова.) (Kazakh: Аяулым Серікқызы Әмренова, born 30 November 2001) is a Kazakhstani freestyle skier. She competed in the 2018, 2022, and 2026 Winter Olympics in the moguls event.
