= Hinako Tomitaka =

Japanese freestyle skier (born 2000)

Personal information
- Born: 21 September 2000 (age 25) Kanagawa Prefecture, Japan

Sport
- Country: Japan
- Sport: Freestyle skiing
- Event: Moguls
- Club: Tama University
Medal record
Women's freestyle skiing
Representing Japan
World Championships
| Silver medal – second place | 2025 St. Moritz | Moguls |

Hinako Tomitaka (冨髙 日向子, Tomitaka Hinako) (born 21 September 2000) is a Japanese freestyle skier who competes internationally.

She competed in the FIS Freestyle Ski and Snowboarding World Championships 2021, where she placed fifth in women's ski moguls.

Competing at the 2026 Winter Olympics in Valtellina, Tomitaka finished in fourth place in the moguls, missing out on the bronze medal on a tiebreak.
