= Camille Cabrol =

French freestyle skier (born 1997)

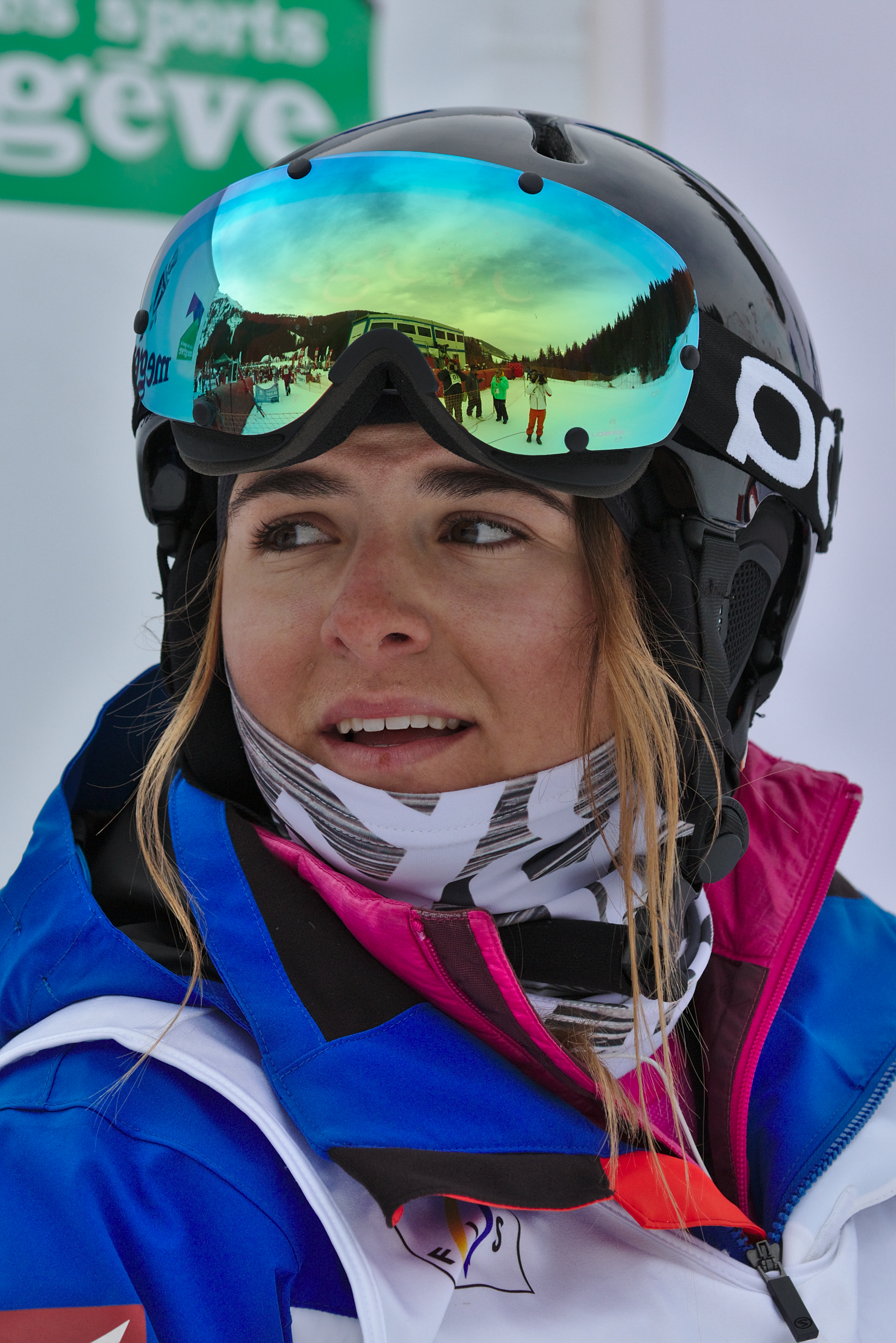
- Cabrol at the FIS Moguls World Cup 2015 Finals

Personal information
- Nationality: French
- Born: 25 December 1997 (age 28) Sallanches (74), France
- Height: 1.63 m (5 ft 4 in)

Sport
- Sport: Freestyle skiing
- Club: Megève

Camille Cabrol (born 25 December 1997 in Sallanches) is a French freestyle skier. Her nickname on social media is Cam. She competed in the 2018 Winter Olympics and 2022 Winter Olympics.

Competing at the 2026 Winter Olympics in Valtellina, she finished in tenth place in the first qualification round of the moguls on 10 February 2026, with a score of 73.07, qualifying her for the final.
