= Short-track speed skating at the 2026 Winter Olympics – Women's 500 metres =

Women's 500 metres at the XXV Olympic Winter Games
- Short-track speed skating
- Venue: Forum di Milano, Milan
- Date: 10 and 12 February
- Competitors: 32 from 16 nations
- Winning time: 41.609

Medalists
1st place, gold medalist(s)		Xandra Velzeboer	Netherlands
2nd place, silver medalist(s)		Arianna Fontana	Italy
3rd place, bronze medalist(s)		Courtney Sarault	Canada

The women's 500 metres competition in short-track speed skating at the 2026 Winter Olympics was held on 10 February (heats) and 12 February (finals), 2026 at the Forum di Milano in Milan. Xandra Velzeboer of the Netherlands won the event, setting a world record in a semi-final. The two-time defending champion, Arianna Fontana of Italy, won silver. Courtney Sarault of Canada won bronze. For Velzeboer and Sarault these were the first individual Olympic medals.

== Background ==
The 2018 and 2022 champion, Arianna Fontana, qualified for the event, as did the bronze medalist, Kim Boutin. The silver medalist, Suzanne Schulting, qualified in both short track and speed skating, but in short track she was only selected for 1500 m. Before the Olympics, Xandra Velzeboer was leading the 2025–26 ISU Short Track World Tour 500 m standings, and Courtney Sarault led the overall standings. Xandra Velzeboer was also the 500 m 2025 World champion.

== Qualification ==
Countries were assigned quotas based on their performance during the 2025–26 ISU Short Track World Tour. A total of 32 athletes from 16 nations qualified for the event.

== Records ==
Prior to this competition, the world and Olympic records were as follows.

World record	Xandra Velzeboer (NED)	41.416	Salt Lake City, United States	4 November 2022
Olympic record	Suzanne Schulting (NED)	42.379	Beijing, China	5 February 2022

A new world record was set during the competition. This was the only world record set at the 2026 Winter Olympics.

Date	Round	Athlete	Country	Time	Record	Ref
12 February	Semifinal 1	Xandra Velzeboer	Netherlands	41.399	WR, OR	

== Results ==
=== Heats ===
10 February 2026, 10:33

Rank	Heat	Name	Country	Time	Notes
1	1	Xandra Velzeboer	Netherlands	42.417	Q
2	1	Chiara Betti	Italy	43.163	Q
3	1	Valentina Aščić	Croatia	44.802	
4	1	Olga Tikhonova	Kazakhstan	46.352	
1	2	Courtney Sarault	Canada	42.464	Q
2	2	Kim Gil-li	South Korea	43.301	Q
3	2	Mirei Nakashima	Japan	43.655	
4	2	Gabriela Topolska	Poland	43.813	
1	3	Wang Xinran	China	43.246	Q
2	3	Rika Kanai	Japan	52.160	Q
3	3	Arianna Sighel	Italy	53.960	
4	3	Corinne Stoddard	United States	1:11.651	
1	4	Michelle Velzeboer	Netherlands	42.598	Q
2	4	Arianna Fontana	Italy	42.668	Q
3	4	Bérénice Comby	France	42.750	q
4	4	Yana Khan	Kazakhstan	1:19.722	
1	5	Kristen Santos-Griswold	United States	42.767	Q
2	5	Zhang Chutong	China	43.100	Q
3	5	Aurélie Lévêque	France	44.488	
4	5	Lea Popovičová	Slovakia	46.101	
1	6	Hanne Desmet	Belgium	43.182	Q
2	6	Choi Min-jeong	South Korea	43.204	Q
3	6	Julie Letai	United States	43.275	q
4	6	Yelyzaveta Sydorko	Ukraine	43.337	
1	7	Kim Boutin	Canada	42.692	Q
2	7	Natalia Maliszewska	Poland	43.313	Q
3	7	Lee So-yeon	South Korea	43.406	q
4	7	Alena Krylova	Individual Neutral Athletes	1:06.997	
1	8	Selma Poutsma	Netherlands	42.629	Q
2	8	Florence Brunelle	Canada	42.838	Q
3	8	Fan Kexin	China	42.992	q
4	8	Diána Laura Végi	Hungary	44.164	

=== Quarterfinals ===
12 February 2026, 20:15

Rank	Heat	Name	Country	Time	Notes
1	1	Xandra Velzeboer	Netherlands	41.583	Q, OR
2	1	Arianna Fontana	Italy	41.679	Q
3	1	Rika Kanai	Japan	43.178	
4	1	Bérénice Comby	France	56.076	
	1	Wang Xinran	China		PEN
1	2	Courtney Sarault	Canada	41.974	Q
2	2	Florence Brunelle	Canada	42.285	Q
3	2	Fan Kexin	China	42.737	q
4	2	Hanne Desmet	Belgium	43.139	
5	2	Natalia Maliszewska	Poland	58.994	
1	3	Kristen Santos-Griswold	United States	42.174	Q
2	3	Michelle Velzeboer	Netherlands	42.417	Q
3	3	Kim Gil-li	South Korea	43.373	
4	3	Julie Letai	United States	1:08.606	
	3	Zhang Chutong	China		PEN
1	4	Choi Min-jeong	South Korea	41.955	Q
2	4	Kim Boutin	Canada	42.196	Q
3	4	Selma Poutsma	Netherlands	42.234	q
4	4	Chiara Betti	Italy	42.279	
5	4	Lee So-yeon	South Korea	43.330	

=== Semifinals ===
12 February 2026, 21:03

Rank	Heat	Name	Country	Time	Notes
1	1	Xandra Velzeboer	Netherlands	41.399	QA, WR
2	1	Arianna Fontana	Italy	41.521	QA
3	1	Selma Poutsma	Netherlands	41.760	qA
4	1	Kristen Santos-Griswold	United States	45.364	QB
5	1	Michelle Velzeboer	Netherlands	1:27.632	QB
1	2	Courtney Sarault	Canada	42.463	QA
2	2	Kim Boutin	Canada	42.672	QA
3	2	Fan Kexin	China	42.833	QB
4	2	Florence Brunelle	Canada	42.838	QB
5	2	Choi Min-jeong	South Korea	43.060	QB

=== Finals ===
==== Final B ====
12 February 2026, 21:32

Rank	Name	Country	Time	Notes
6	Florence Brunelle	Canada	43.397	
7	Choi Min-jeong	South Korea	43.473	
8	Michelle Velzeboer	Netherlands	1:05.774	
9	Kristen Santos-Griswold	United States	1:08.444	
10	Fan Kexin	China	1:19.245	

==== Final A ====
12 February 2026, 21:35

Rank	Name	Country	Time	Notes
1st place, gold medalist(s)	Xandra Velzeboer	Netherlands	41.609	
2nd place, silver medalist(s)	Arianna Fontana	Italy	42.294	
3rd place, bronze medalist(s)	Courtney Sarault	Canada	42.427	
4	Selma Poutsma	Netherlands	42.491	
5	Kim Boutin	Canada	44.347	
