= Short-track speed skating at the 2026 Winter Olympics – Women's 1000 metres =

Women's 1000 metres at the XXV Olympic Winter Games
- Short-track speed skating
- Venue: Forum di Milano, Milan
- Date: 14 and 16 February
- Competitors: 32 from 14 nations
- Winning time: 1:28.437

Medalists
1st place, gold medalist(s)		Xandra Velzeboer	Netherlands
2nd place, silver medalist(s)		Courtney Sarault	Canada
3rd place, bronze medalist(s)		Kim Gil-li	South Korea

The women's 1000 metres competition in short-track speed skating at the 2026 Winter Olympics was held on 14 February (heats) and 16 February (finals), 2026 at the Forum di Milano in Milan. Xandra Velzeboer of the Netherlands won the event. Courtney Sarault of Canada was second, and Kim Gil-li of South Korea third, her first Olympic medal.

== Background ==
World and Olympic record holder and Olympic champion in 2018 and 2022, Suzanne Schulting did not skate to defend her title, despite being on the Dutch team. Coach Niels Kerstholt gave preference to other teammates based on performance at international competitions. Schulting did compete at the 1500m short-track and 1000m long-track speed skating events. The silver medalist, Choi Min-jeong, qualified for the event, as did the bronze medalist, Hanne Desmet. Before the Olympics, Courtney Sarault was leading both the 2025–26 ISU Short Track World Tour 1000 m standings and the overall standings. Desmet was the 1000 m 2025 World champion.

== Qualification ==
Countries were assigned quotas based on their performance during the 2025–26 ISU Short Track World Tour. A total of 32 athletes from 15 nations qualified for the event.

== Records ==
Prior to this competition, the world and Olympic records were as follows.

World record	Suzanne Schulting (NED)	1:25.958	Salt Lake City, United States	4 November 2022
Olympic record	Suzanne Schulting (NED)	1:26.514	Beijing, China	11 February 2022

== Results ==
=== Heats ===
14 February 2026, 21:01

Rank	Heat	Name	Country	Time	Notes
1	1	Courtney Sarault	Canada	1:28.178	Q
2	1	Cloé Ollivier	France	1:28.603	Q
3	1	Diána Laura Végi	Hungary	1:28.779	q
4	1	Ami Hirai	Japan	1:29.276	
1	2	Hanne Desmet	Belgium	1:29.661	Q
2	2	Noh Do-hee	South Korea	1:30.097	Q
3	2	Natalia Maliszewska	Poland	1:31.282	
4	2	Aurélie Lévêque	France	1:32.394	
1	3	Gong Li	China	1:27.788	Q
2	3	Gabriela Topolska	Poland	1:31.999	Q
3	3	Corinne Stoddard	United States	1:32.178	
4	3	Selma Poutsma	Netherlands	1:53.774	
1	4	Xandra Velzeboer	Netherlands	1:27.816	Q
2	4	Zhang Chutong	China	1:28.357	Q
3	4	Alena Krylova	Individual Neutral Athletes	1:28.495	q
4	4	Maja Somodi	Hungary	1:28.661	
1	5	Choi Min-jeong	South Korea	1:26.925	Q
2	5	Kim Boutin	Canada	1:27.069	Q
3	5	Chiara Betti	Italy	1:27.835	q
4	5	Valentina Aščić	Croatia	1:27.863	
1	6	Elisa Confortola	Italy	1:28.300	Q
2	6	Kristen Santos-Griswold	United States	1:28.564	Q
3	6	Yang Jingru	China	1:28.977	q
4	6	Aoi Watanabe	Japan	1:30.764	
1	7	Arianna Fontana	Italy	1:30.638	Q
2	7	Florence Brunelle	Canada	1:30.734	Q
3	7	Mirei Nakashima	Japan	1:31.520	
4	7	Olga Tikhonova	Kazakhstan	1:31.771	
1	8	Kim Gil-li	South Korea	1:29.656	Q
2	8	Michelle Velzeboer	Netherlands	1:29.730	Q
3	8	Kamila Sellier	Poland	1:29.948	
4	8	Julie Letai	United States	1:30.287	

=== Quarterfinals ===
16 February 2026, 11:00

Rank	Heat	Name	Country	Time	Notes
1	1	Arianna Fontana	Italy	1:28.613	Q
2	1	Choi Min-jeong	South Korea	1:28.752	Q
3	1	Kim Boutin	Canada	1:28.907	
4	1	Chiara Betti	Italy	1:29.065	
5	1	Gabriela Topolska	Poland	1:31.541	
1	2	Hanne Desmet	Belgium	1:27.533	Q
2	2	Florence Brunelle	Canada	1:27.637	Q
3	2	Gong Li	China	1:28.147	q
4	2	Alena Krylova	Individual Neutral Athletes	2:31.857	ADV
	2	Zhang Chutong	China		PEN
1	3	Xandra Velzeboer	Netherlands	1:28.986	Q
2	3	Kim Gil-li	South Korea	1:29.068	Q
3	3	Kristen Santos-Griswold	United States	1:29.102	
4	3	Diána Laura Végi	Hungary	1:29.976	
5	3	Noh Do-hee	South Korea	1:32.174	
1	4	Courtney Sarault	Canada	1:28.592	Q
2	4	Elisa Confortola	Italy	1:28.659	Q
3	4	Michelle Velzeboer	Netherlands	1:28.686	
4	4	Yang Jingru	China	1:28.838	
5	4	Cloé Ollivier	France	1:28.964	

=== Semifinals ===
16 February 2026, 12:00

Rank	Heat	Name	Country	Time	Notes
1	1	Xandra Velzeboer	Netherlands	1:29.514	QA
2	1	Gong Li	China	1:29.737	QA
3	1	Florence Brunelle	Canada	1:29.903	QB
4	1	Kim Gil-li	South Korea	2:01.422	ADVA
	1	Hanne Desmet	Belgium		PEN
1	2	Courtney Sarault	Canada	1:28.097	QA
2	2	Arianna Fontana	Italy	1:28.166	QA
3	2	Elisa Confortola	Italy	1:28.208	QB
4	2	Choi Min-jeong	South Korea	1:28.407	QB
5	2	Alena Krylova	Individual Neutral Athletes	2:10.169	QB

=== Finals ===
==== Final B ====
16 February 2026, 12:42

Rank	Name	Country	Time	Notes
6	Elisa Confortola	Italy	1:31.099	
7	Florence Brunelle	Canada	1:31.134	
8	Choi Min-jeong	South Korea	1:31.208	
9	Alena Krylova	Individual Neutral Athletes	1:31.702	

==== Final A ====
16 February 2026, 12:48

Rank	Name	Country	Time	Notes
1st place, gold medalist(s)	Xandra Velzeboer	Netherlands	1:28.437	
2nd place, silver medalist(s)	Courtney Sarault	Canada	1:28.523	
3rd place, bronze medalist(s)	Kim Gil-li	South Korea	1:28.614	
4	Arianna Fontana	Italy	1:28.745	
5	Gong Li	China	1:29.392	
