= France at the 2026 Winter Olympics =

- Flag of France
- IOC code: FRA
- NOC: French National Olympic and Sports Committee
- Website: www.franceolympique.com (in French)

in Milan and Cortina d'Ampezzo, Italy 6 February 2026 – 22 February 2026
- Competitors: 160 (89 men and 71 women) in 14 sports
- Flag bearers (opening): Clément Noël & Chloé Trespeuch
- Flag bearers (closing): Mathis Desloges & Lou Jeanmonnot
- Medals Ranked 6th: Gold 8 Silver 9 Bronze 6 Total 23

Winter Olympics appearances (overview)
- 1924; 1928; 1932; 1936; 1948; 1952; 1956; 1960; 1964; 1968; 1972; 1976; 1980; 1984; 1988; 1992; 1994; 1998; 2002; 2006; 2010; 2014; 2018; 2022; 2026

France competed at the 2026 Winter Olympics in Milan and Cortina d'Ampezzo, Italy, which was held from 6 to 22 February 2026. As French Alps will host the 2030 Winter Olympics, France was the penultimate nation to enter the stadium before the host country Italy during the parade of nations at the opening ceremony as the country is the host of the next edition in 2030.

France achieved its most successful Winter Olympic performance in history at the 2026 Games, winning a record 23 medals, including 8 gold, 9 silver, and 6 bronze. This surpassed the country's previous record of total 15 medals set in 2014 and 2018.

== Competitors ==
The following is the list of number of competitors participating at the Games per sport/discipline.

| Sport | Men | Women | Total |
|---|---|---|---|
| Alpine skiing | 8 | 8 | 16 |
| Biathlon | 6 | 6 | 12 |
| Bobsleigh | 4 | 2 | 6 |
| Cross-country skiing | 8 | 7 | 15 |
| Figure skating | 5 | 4 | 9 |
| Freestyle skiing | 11 | 8 | 19 |
| Ice hockey | 25 | 23 | 48 |
| Nordic combined | 3 | 0 | 3 |
| Short-track speed skating | 2 | 4 | 6 |
| Skeleton | 1 | 0 | 1 |
| Ski jumping | 3 | 2 | 5 |
| Ski mountaineering | 2 | 2 | 4 |
| Snowboarding | 6 | 4 | 10 |
| Speed skating | 5 | 1 | 6 |
| Total | 89 | 71 | 160 |

== Medalists ==
The following French competitors won medals at the Games. In the discipline sections below, the medalists' names are bolded.

| Medal | Name | Sport | Event | Date |
|---|---|---|---|---|
| Gold | Éric Perrot; Quentin Fillon Maillet; Lou Jeanmonnot; Julia Simon | Biathlon | Mixed relay | 8 February |
| Gold | Julia Simon | Biathlon | Women's individual | 11 February |
| Gold | Laurence Fournier Beaudry; Guillaume Cizeron | Figure skating | Ice dance | 11 February |
| Gold | Quentin Fillon Maillet | Biathlon | Men's sprint | 13 February |
| Gold | Fabien Claude; Émilien Jacquelin; Quentin Fillon Maillet; Éric Perrot | Biathlon | Men's relay | 17 February |
| Gold | Camille Bened; Lou Jeanmonnot; Océane Michelon; Julia Simon | Biathlon | Women's relay | 18 February |
| Gold | Emily Harrop; Thibault Anselmet | Ski mountaineering | Mixed relay | 21 February |
| Gold | Océane Michelon | Biathlon | Women's mass start | 21 February |
| Silver | Mathis Desloges | Cross-country skiing | Men's 20 km skiathlon | 8 February |
| Silver | Éric Perrot | Biathlon | Men's individual | 10 February |
| Silver | Lou Jeanmonnot | Biathlon | Women's individual | 11 February |
| Silver | Romane Miradoli | Alpine skiing | Women's super-G | 12 February |
| Silver | Mathis Desloges | Cross-country skiing | Men's 10 km freestyle | 13 February |
| Silver | Océane Michelon | Biathlon | Women's sprint | 14 February |
| Silver | Théo Schely; Hugo Lapalus; Mathis Desloges; Victor Lovera | Cross-country skiing | Men's 4 × 7.5 km relay | 15 February |
| Silver | Emily Harrop | Ski mountaineering | Women's sprint | 19 February |
| Silver | Julia Simon | Biathlon | Women's mass start | 21 February |
| Bronze | Perrine Laffont | Freestyle skiing | Women's moguls | 11 February |
| Bronze | Lou Jeanmonnot | Biathlon | Women's sprint | 14 February |
| Bronze | Émilien Jacquelin | Biathlon | Men's pursuit | 15 February |
| Bronze | Loan Bozzolo; Léa Casta | Snowboarding | Mixed team | 15 February |
| Bronze | Thibault Anselmet | Ski mountaineering | Men's sprint | 19 February |
| Bronze | Quentin Fillon Maillet | Biathlon | Men's mass start | 20 February |

Medals by date
| **Day** | **Date** | 1st place, gold medalist(s) | 2nd place, silver medalist(s) | 3rd place, bronze medalist(s) | **Total** |
| 1 | 7 February | 0 | 0 | 0 | 0 |
| 2 | 8 February | 1 | 1 | 0 | 2 |
| 3 | 9 February | 0 | 0 | 0 | 0 |
| 4 | 10 February | 0 | 1 | 0 | 1 |
| 5 | 11 February | 2 | 1 | 1 | 4 |
| 6 | 12 February | 0 | 1 | 0 | 1 |
| 7 | 13 February | 1 | 1 | 0 | 2 |
| 8 | 14 February | 0 | 1 | 1 | 2 |
| 9 | 15 February | 0 | 1 | 2 | 3 |
| 10 | 16 February | 0 | 0 | 0 | 0 |
| 11 | 17 February | 1 | 0 | 0 | 1 |
| 12 | 18 February | 1 | 0 | 0 | 1 |
| 13 | 19 February | 0 | 1 | 1 | 2 |
| 14 | 20 February | 0 | 0 | 1 | 1 |
| 15 | 21 February | 2 | 1 | 0 | 3 |
| 16 | 22 February | 0 | 0 | 0 | 0 |
| Total | | 8 | 9 | 6 | 23 |

Medals by sport
| Sport | 1st place, gold medalist(s) | 2nd place, silver medalist(s) | 3rd place, bronze medalist(s) | Total |
| Biathlon | 6 | 4 | 3 | 13 |
| Ski mountaineering | 1 | 1 | 1 | 3 |
| Figure skating | 1 | 0 | 0 | 1 |
| Cross-country skiing | 0 | 3 | 0 | 3 |
| Alpine skiing | 0 | 1 | 0 | 1 |
| Freestyle skiing | 0 | 0 | 1 | 1 |
| Snowboarding | 0 | 0 | 1 | 1 |
| Total | 8 | 9 | 6 | 23 |

Medals by gender
| Gender | 1st place, gold medalist(s) | 2nd place, silver medalist(s) | 3rd place, bronze medalist(s) | Total |
| Male | 2 | 4 | 3 | 9 |
| Female | 3 | 5 | 2 | 10 |
| Mixed | 3 | 0 | 1 | 4 |
| Total | 8 | 9 | 6 | 23 |

Multiple medalists
| **Name** | **Sport** | 1st place, gold medalist(s) | 2nd place, silver medalist(s) | 3rd place, bronze medalist(s) | Total |
| Julia Simon | Biathlon | 3 | 1 | 0 | 4 |
| Quentin Fillon Maillet | Biathlon | 3 | 0 | 1 | 4 |
| Lou Jeanmonnot | Biathlon | 2 | 1 | 1 | 4 |
| Océane Michelon | Biathlon | 2 | 1 | 0 | 3 |
| Éric Perrot | Biathlon | 2 | 1 | 0 | 3 |
| Emily Harrop | Ski mountaineering | 1 | 1 | 0 | 2 |
| Émilien Jacquelin | Biathlon | 1 | 0 | 1 | 2 |
| Thibault Anselmet | Ski mountaineering | 1 | 0 | 1 | 2 |
| Mathis Desloges | Cross-country skiing | 0 | 3 | 0 | 3 |

== Alpine skiing ==
France qualified one female and one male alpine skier through the basic quota.

Men

| Athlete | Event | Run 1 | | Run 2 | | Total | |
| Athlete | Event | Time | Rank | Time | Rank | Time | Rank |
|---|---|---|---|---|---|---|---|
| Nils Allègre | Downhill | —N/a | | | | 1:52.80 | 8 |
| Nils Allègre | Super-G | —N/a | | | | 1:25.63 | 4 |
| Nils Alphand | Downhill | —N/a | | | | 1:54.06 | 22 |
| Nils Alphand | Super-G | —N/a | | | | DNF | |
| Steven Amiez | Slalom | 1:00.18 | 20 | 57.41 | 9 | 1:57.59 | 18 |
| Léo Anguenot | Giant slalom | 1:15.83 | 5 | 1:11.16 | 12 | 2:26.99 | 6 |
| Léo Anguenot | Slalom | DNF | | | | | |
| Alban Elezi Cannaferina | Downhill | —N/a | | | | 1:54.90 | 27 |
| Alban Elezi Cannaferina | Super-G | —N/a | | | | 1:26.77 | 15 |
| Alban Elezi Cannaferina | Giant slalom | 1:18.79 | 31 | DNF | | | |
| Maxence Muzaton | Downhill | —N/a | | | | DNF | |
| Clément Noël | Slalom | 58.10 | 7 | DNF | | | |
| Paco Rassat | Slalom | DNF | | | | | |
| Maxence Muzaton; Paco Rassat | Team combined | 1:54.31 | 18 | 52.08 | 4 | 2:46.39 | 15 |
| Nils Alphand; Steven Amiez | Team combined | 1:54.29 | 17 | 52.37 | 9 | 2:46.66 | 16 |
| Nils Allègre; Clément Noël | Team combined | 1:52.71 | 6 | 52.45 | 10 | 2:45.16 | 5 |

Women

| Athlete | Event | Run 1 | | Run 2 | | Total | |
| Athlete | Event | Time | Rank | Time | Rank | Time | Rank |
|---|---|---|---|---|---|---|---|
| Camille Cerutti | Downhill | —N/a | | | | 1:40.41 | 23 |
| Camille Cerutti | Super-G | —N/a | | | | 1:24.44 | 8 |
| Camille Cerutti | Giant slalom | 1:05.98 | 30 | DNF | | | |
| Marion Chevrier | Slalom | DNF | | | | | |
| Clara Direz | Giant slalom | DNF | | | | | |
| Doriane Escané | Giant slalom | 1:04.82 | 19 | 1:10.57 | 20 | 2:15.39 | 22 |
| Doriane Escané | Slalom | 50.63 | 35 | DNF | | | |
| Laura Gauché | Downhill | —N/a | | | | 1:37.98 | 13 |
| Laura Gauché | Super-G | —N/a | | | | 1:25.02 | 12 |
| Marie Lamure | Slalom | 49.03 | 13 | 53.11 | 19 | 1:42.14 | 15 |
| Caitlin McFarlane | Slalom | 48.88 | 12 | 52.90 | 16 | 1:41.78 | 10 |
| Romane Miradoli | Downhill | —N/a | | | | 1:38.10 | 16 |
| Romane Miradoli | Super-G | —N/a | | | | 1:23.82 | 2nd place, silver medalist(s) |
| Romane Miradoli; Marie Lamure | Team combined | 1:37.37 | 8 | DNF | | | |
| Laura Gauché; Marion Chevrier | Team combined | 1:37.92 | 11 | 44.87 | 4 | 2:22.79 | 8 |
| Camille Cerutti; Caitlin McFarlane | Team combined | 1:38.69 | 17 | 45.00 | 9 | 2:23.69 | 12 |

== Biathlon ==
France qualified six female and six male biathletes through the 2024–25 Biathlon World Cup score.

Men

| Athlete | Event | Time | Misses | Rank |
|---|---|---|---|---|
| Fabien Claude | Individual | 55:46.9 | 4 (2+1+0+1) | 17 |
| Émilien Jacquelin | Individual | 58:59.4 | 6 (2+1+0+3) | 55 |
| Quentin Fillon Maillet | Individual | 54:20.9 | 4 (1+2+0+1) | 8 |
| Éric Perrot | Individual | 51:46.3 | 1 (0+1+0+0) | 2nd place, silver medalist(s) |
| Fabien Claude | Sprint | 25:23.2 | 5 (2+3) | 41 |
| Émilien Jacquelin | Sprint | 23:09.2 | 0 (0+0) | 4 |
| Quentin Fillon Maillet | Sprint | 22:53.1 | 0 (0+0) | 1st place, gold medalist(s) |
| Éric Perrot | Sprint | 23:55.2 | 2 (1+1) | 9 |
| Fabien Claude | Pursuit | 34:22.4 | 4 (1+0+1+2) | 24 |
| Émilien Jacquelin | Pursuit | 31:41.6 | 3 (1+0+0+2) | 3rd place, bronze medalist(s) |
| Quentin Fillon Maillet | Pursuit | 32:25.4 | 5 (1+2+0+2) | 7 |
| Éric Perrot | Pursuit | 31:51.4 | 1 (0+0+0+1) | 4 |
| Fabien Claude | Mass start | 45:13.7 | 9 (3+1+4+1) | 27 |
| Émilien Jacquelin | Mass start | 41:56.7 | 6 (0+1+4+1) | 12 |
| Quentin Fillon Maillet | Mass start | 39:42.7 | 4 (1+0+2+1) | 3rd place, bronze medalist(s) |
| Éric Perrot | Mass start | 43:01.5 | 7 (1+2+3+1) | 20 |
| Fabien Claude; Émilien Jacquelin; Quentin Fillon Maillet; Éric Perrot | Team relay | 1:19:55.2 | 10 (1+9) | 1st place, gold medalist(s) |

Women

| Athlete | Event | Time | Misses | Rank |
|---|---|---|---|---|
| Camille Bened | Individual | 42:52.3 | 1 (0+0+0+1) | 6 |
| Justine Braisaz-Bouchet | Individual | 49:50.2 | 8 (2+2+3+1) | 80 |
| Lou Jeanmonnot | Individual | 42:08.7 | 2 (0+1+1+0) | 2nd place, silver medalist(s) |
| Julia Simon | Individual | 41:15.6 | 1 (0+1+0+0) | 1st place, gold medalist(s) |
| Océane Michelon | Sprint | 20:44.6 | 0 (0+0) | 2nd place, silver medalist(s) |
| Justine Braisaz-Bouchet | Sprint | 23:24.4 | 4 (2+2) | 62 |
| Lou Jeanmonnot | Sprint | 21:04.5 | 1 (0+1) | 3rd place, bronze medalist(s) |
| Julia Simon | Sprint | 22:36.6 | 2 (0+2) | 34 |
| Océane Michelon | Pursuit | 31:08.9 | 4 (2+0+1+1) | 5 |
| Lou Jeanmonnot | Pursuit | 31:01.2 | 3 (0+1+1+1) | 4 |
| Julia Simon | Pursuit | DNS | | |
| Océane Michelon | Mass start | 37:18.1 | 2 (1+0+0+1) | 1st place, gold medalist(s) |
| Justine Braisaz-Bouchet | Mass start | 40:30.3 | 6 (0+2+2+2) | 27 |
| Lou Jeanmonnot | Mass start | 38:47.7 | 3 (0+0+1+2) | 16 |
| Julia Simon | Mass start | 37:24.7 | 1 (0+0+1+0) | 2nd place, silver medalist(s) |
| Camille Bened; Lou Jeanmonnot; Océane Michelon; Julia Simon | Team relay | 1:10:22.7 | 7 (1+6) | 1st place, gold medalist(s) |

Mixed

| Athlete | Event | Time | Misses | Rank |
|---|---|---|---|---|
| Éric Perrot; Quentin Fillon Maillet; Lou Jeanmonnot; Julia Simon | Relay | 1:04:15.5 | 7 (0+7) | 1st place, gold medalist(s) |

== Bobsleigh ==
| Athlete | Event | Run 1 | | Run 2 | | Run 3 | | Run 4 | | Total | |
| Athlete | Event | Time | Rank | Time | Rank | Time | Rank | Time | Rank | Time | Rank |
|---|---|---|---|---|---|---|---|---|---|---|---|
| Romain Heinrich*; Dorian Hauterville | Two-man | 55.75 | 11 | 55.89 | 8 | 55.75 | 12 | 55.93 | 13 | 3:43.32 | 10 |
| Romain Heinrich*; Nils Blairon; Dorian Hauterville; Antoine Riou | Four-man | 55.59 | 26 | DNF | | | | | | | |
| Margot Boch | Monobob | 1:00.02 | 6 | 1:00.30 | 11 | 59.79 | 10 | 59.84 | 11 | 3:59.95 | 10 |
| Margot Boch*; Carla Sénéchal | Two-woman | 57.98 | 19 | 57.85 | 14 | 58.54 | 20 | 58.05 | 15 | 3:52.42 | 17 |

== Cross-country skiing ==
France qualified one female and one male cross-country skier through the basic quota. Following the completion of the 2024–25 FIS Cross-Country World Cup, France qualified further five female and six male athletes. After reallocation of declined quotas, France qualified one more female and one more male athlete.

Distance

| Athlete | Event | Classical | | Freestyle | | Final | | |
| Athlete | Event | Time | Rank | Time | Rank | Time | Deficit | Rank |
|---|---|---|---|---|---|---|---|---|
| Mathis Desloges | Men's skiathlon | 23:25.3 | 7 | 22:21.1 | 1 | 46:13.0 | +2.0 | 2nd place, silver medalist(s) |
| Hugo Lapalus | Men's skiathlon | 23:24.6 | 5 | 22:24.8 | 6 | 46:15.3 | +4.3 | 5 |
| Jules Lapierre | Men's skiathlon | 24:04.7 | 12 | 22:29.1 | 9 | 47:00.3 | +49.3 | 9 |
| Victor Lovera | Men's skiathlon | 24:12.6 | 23 | 22:42.1 | 11 | 47:23.1 | +1:12.1 | 15 |
| Mathis Desloges | Men's 10 kilometre freestyle | —N/a | | | | 20:41.1 | +4.9 | 2nd place, silver medalist(s) |
| Hugo Lapalus | Men's 10 kilometre freestyle | —N/a | | | | 21:27.3 | +51.1 | 8 |
| Jules Lapierre | Men's 10 kilometre freestyle | —N/a | | | | 21:43.9 | +1:07.7 | 16 |
| Victor Lovera | Men's 10 kilometre freestyle | —N/a | | | | 21:32.4 | +56.2 | 10 |
| Mathis Desloges; Hugo Lapalus; Théo Schely; Victor Lovera | Men's 4 × 7.5 kilometre relay | —N/a | | | | 1:04:46.7 | +22.2 | 2nd place, silver medalist(s) |
| Mathis Desloges | Men's 50 kilometre classical | —N/a | | | | 2:22:53.6 | +16:08.8 | 33 |
| Hugo Lapalus | Men's 50 kilometre classical | —N/a | | | | 2:22:53.6 | +16:08.8 | 34 |
| Théo Schely | Men's 50 kilometre classical | —N/a | | | | 2:09:44.5 | +2:59.7 | 4 |
| Victor Lovera | Men's 50 kilometre classical | —N/a | | | | 2:11:29.9 | +4:45.1 | 8 |
| Delphine Claudel | Women's skiathlon | 30:04.5 | 38 | 28:25.4 | 25 | 59:00.3 | +5:15.1 | 31 |
| Cloé Pagnier | Women's skiathlon | 29:03.1 | 21 | 28:53.3 | 33 | 58:29.4 | +4:44.2 | 27 |
| Léonie Perry | Women's skiathlon | 29:20.2 | 25 | 27:39.6 | 11 | 57:40.4 | +3:55.2 | 16 |
| Julie Pierrel | Women's skiathlon | 29:04.8 | 22 | 28:11.9 | 20 | 57:47.5 | +4:02.3 | 21 |
| Delphine Claudel | Women's 10 kilometre freestyle | —N/a | | | | 24:53.8 | +2:04.6 | 22 |
| Mélissa Gal | Women's 10 kilometre freestyle | —N/a | | | | 26:08.0 | +3:18.8 | 51 |
| Léonie Perry | Women's 10 kilometre freestyle | —N/a | | | | 24:11.2 | +1:22.0 | 10 |
| Julie Pierrel | Women's 10 kilometre freestyle | —N/a | | | | 25:29.3 | +2:40.1 | 36 |
| Delphine Claudel; Cloé Pagnier; Léonie Perry; Julie Pierrel | Women's 4 × 7.5 kilometre relay | —N/a | | | | 1:20:28.6 | +4:43.8 | 9 |
| Julie Pierrel | Women's 50 kilometre classical | —N/a | | | | DNS | | |
| Cloé Pagnier | Women's 50 kilometre classical | —N/a | | | | 2:27:52.1 | +11:23.9 | 13 |
| Justine Gaillard | Women's 50 kilometre classical | —N/a | | | | 2:45:17.7 | +28:49.5 | 33 |

Sprint

| Athlete | Event | Qualification | | Quarterfinal | | Semifinal | | Final | |
| Athlete | Event | Time | Rank | Time | Rank | Time | Rank | Time | Rank |
|---|---|---|---|---|---|---|---|---|---|
| Lucas Chanavat | Men's sprint | 3:15.29 | 10 Q | 3:32.22 | 4 | Did not advance | | | 19 |
| Jules Chappaz | Men's sprint | 3:12.86 | 2 Q | 3:30.92 | 3 | Did not advance | | | 13 |
| Richard Jouve | Men's sprint | 3:16.44 | 18 Q | 3:41.45 | 5 | Did not advance | | | 24 |
| Théo Schely | Men's sprint | 3:17.84 | 22 Q | 3:29.37 | 6 | Did not advance | | | 27 |
| Mathis Desloges; Jules Chappaz | Men's team sprint | 5:52.67 | 6 Q | —N/a | | | | 18:47.87 | 12 |
| Clémence Didierlaurent | Women's sprint | 3:51.93 | 38 | Did not advance | | | | | 38 |
| Justine Gaillard | Women's sprint | 3:51.37 | 34 | Did not advance | | | | | 34 |
| Mélissa Gal | Women's sprint | 3:43.39 | 11 Q | 4:07.84 | 6 | Did not advance | | | 26 |
| Julie Pierrel | Women's sprint | 3:46.22 | 18 Q | 4:13.57 | 6 | Did not advance | | | 27 |
| Léonie Perry; Mélissa Gal | Women's team sprint | 6:52.54 | 10 Q | —N/a | | | | 20:53.61 | 7 |

== Figure skating ==
In the 2025 World Figure Skating Championships in Boston, the United States, France secured two quotas in men's singles, one quota in women's singles, and two quotas in ice dance. France earned one quota in the pairs' competition at the ISU Skate to Milano Figure Skating Qualifier 2025 in Beijing, China, but only after reallocation of rejected quotas. Furthermore, France qualified to the team event.

| Athlete | Event | SP/SD | | FP/FD | | Total | |
| Athlete | Event | Points | Rank | Points | Rank | Points | Rank |
|---|---|---|---|---|---|---|---|
| Kévin Aymoz | Men's singles | 92.64 | 7 Q | 167.30 | 11 | 259.94 | 11 |
| Adam Siao Him Fa | Men's singles | 102.55 | 3 Q | 166.72 | 12 | 269.27 | 7 |
| Lorine Schild | Women's singles | 55.63 | 24 Q | 111.45 | 22 | 167.08 | 22 |
| Camille Kovalev; Pavel Kovalev | Pairs | 64.65 | 16 Q | 113.78 | 15 | 178.43 | 16 |
| Laurence Fournier Beaudry; Guillaume Cizeron | Ice dance | 90.18 | 1 Q | 135.64 | 1 | 225.82 | 1st place, gold medalist(s) |
| Evgeniia Lopareva; Geoffrey Brissaud | Ice dance | 82.25 | 8 Q | 121.43 | 8 | 203.68 | 8 |

Team event

| Athlete | Event | Short program / Rhythm dance | | | | | | Free skate / Free dance | | | | Total | |
| Athlete | Event | Men's | Women's | Pairs | Ice dance | Total | | Men's | Women's | Pairs | Ice dance | Total | |
| Athlete | Event | Points Team points | Points Team points | Points Team points | Points Team points | Points | Rank | Points Team points | Points Team points | Points Team points | Points Team points | Points | Rank |
|---|---|---|---|---|---|---|---|---|---|---|---|---|---|
| Kévin Aymoz (M); Lorine Schild (W); Camille Kovalev / Pavel Kovalev (P); Laurence Fournier Beaudry / Guillaume Cizeron (ID) | Team event | 88.05; 7 | 62.24; 4 | 63.72; 4 | 89.98; 9 | 24 | 6 | Did not advance | | | | | |

== Freestyle skiing ==
Moguls
Men

| Athlete | Event | Qualification | | | | | | | | Final | | | | | | | |
| Athlete | Event | Run 1 | | | | Run 2 | | | | Run 1 | | | | Run 2 | | | Rank |
| Athlete | Event | Time | Points | Total | Rank | Time | Points | Total | Rank | Time | Points | Total | Rank | Time | Points | Total | Rank |
|---|---|---|---|---|---|---|---|---|---|---|---|---|---|---|---|---|---|
| Benjamin Cavet | Men's | 17.87 | 60.56 | 78.43 | 4 | Bye | | | | 17.56 | 61.28 | 78.84 | 10 | Did not advance | | | 10 |
| Arthur de Villaucourt | Men's | 17.56 | 50.76 | 68.32 | 25 | 14.78 | 58.24 | 73.02 | 14 | Did not advance | | | | | | | 25 |
| Paul Andréa Gay | Men's | 24.60 | 20.50 | 35.39 | 29 | 15.09 | 55.45 | 70.54 | 15 | Did not advance | | | | | | | 26 |
| Thibaud Mouille | Men's | 15.56 | 60.97 | 76.53 | 8 | Bye | | | | 16.16 | 63.19 | 79.35 | 9 | Did not advance | | | 9 |

Women

| Athlete | Event | Qualification | | | | | | | | Final | | | | | | | |
| Athlete | Event | Run 1 | | | | Run 2 | | | | Run 1 | | | | Run 2 | | | Rank |
| Athlete | Event | Time | Points | Total | Rank | Time | Points | Total | Rank | Time | Points | Total | Rank | Time | Points | Total | Rank |
|---|---|---|---|---|---|---|---|---|---|---|---|---|---|---|---|---|---|
| Camille Cabrol | Women's | 27.25 | 57.11 | 73.07 | 10 | Bye | | | | 26.35 | 47.11 | 61.43 | 20 | Did not advance | | | 20 |
| Marie Duaux | Women's | 30.54 | 46.91 | 59.00 | 22 | 30.39 | 52.86 | 65.13 | 13 | Did not advance | | | | | | | 23 |
| Perrine Laffont | Women's | 25.55 | 61.41 | 79.47 | 4 Q | Bye | | | | 25.97 | 58.75 | 76.21 | 8 Q | 26.16 | 60.76 | 78.00 | 3rd place, bronze medalist(s) |

Dual moguls
Men

| Athlete | Event | 1/16 Final | 1/8 Final | Quarterfinal | Semifinal | Final | |
| Athlete | Event | Opposition Result | Opposition Result | Opposition Result | Opposition Result | Opposition Result | Rank |
|---|---|---|---|---|---|---|---|
| Benjamin Cavet | Men's | Murphy (AUS); L 12–23 | Did not advance | | | | 25 |
| Arthur de Villaucourt | Men's | Kolmakov (KAZ); L 13–22 | Did not advance | | | | 24 |
| Paul Andréa Gay | Men's | Mouille (FRA); W 19–16 | Jung (KOR); L 9–26 | Did not advance | | | 10 |
| Thibaud Mouille | Men's | Gay (FRA); L 16–19 | Did not advance | | | | 17 |

Women

| Athlete | Event | 1/16 Final | 1/8 Final | Quarterfinal | Semifinal | Final | |
| Athlete | Event | Opposition Result | Opposition Result | Opposition Result | Opposition Result | Opposition Result | Rank |
|---|---|---|---|---|---|---|---|
| Camille Cabrol | Women's | Yanagimoto (JPN); W 19–16 | Gorodko (KAZ); L 13–22 | Did not advance | | | 12 |
| Marie Duaux | Women's | Schwinghammer (CAN); L 14–21 | Did not advance | | | | 20 |
| Perrine Laffont | Women's | Ramsauer (AUT); W 29–6 | Schwinghammer (CAN); W 21–14 | Johnson (USA); W 18–17 | Kauf (USA); FB L DNF | Lemley (USA); L 17–18 | 4 |

Park & Pipe

| Athlete | Event | Qualification | | | | | Final | | | | |
| Athlete | Event | Run 1 | Run 2 | Run 3 | Best/Total | Rank | Run 1 | Run 2 | Run 3 | Best/Total | Rank |
|---|---|---|---|---|---|---|---|---|---|---|---|
| Vincent Maharavo | Men's halfpipe | 26.25 | 46.25 | —N/a | 46.25 | 21 | Did not advance | | | | |
| Matias Roche | Men's big air | 95.25 | 21.00 | 83.25 | 178.50 | 6 Q | 18.75 | 85.25 | 17.75 | 103.00 | 10 |
| Matias Roche | Men's slopestyle | 54.50 | 57.96 | —N/a | 57.96 | 15 | Did not advance | | | | |
| Timothé Sivignon | Men's big air | 93.00 | 85.00 | DNI | 178.00 | 7 Q | 46.50 | DNI | 33.75 | 80.25 | 11 |
| Timothé Sivignon | Men's slopestyle | 38.93 | 31.95 | —N/a | 38.93 | 23 | Did not advance | | | | |
| Kim Dumont-Zanella | Women's big air | 18.25 | 74.50 | 55.00 | 129.50 | 18 | Did not advance | | | | |
| Kim Dumont-Zanella | Women's slopestyle | 0.50 | 22.85 | —N/a | 22.85 | 22 | Did not advance | | | | |

Ski cross
Men

| Athlete | Event | Seeding | | 1/8 final | Quarterfinal | Semifinal | Final | |
| Athlete | Event | Time | Rank | Position | Position | Position | Position | Rank |
|---|---|---|---|---|---|---|---|---|
| Youri Duplessis Kergomard | Men's | 1:08.18 | 21 | 1 Q | 4 | Did not advance | | 15 |
| Evan Klufts | Men's | 1:08.29 | 23 | DNF | Did not advance | | | 25 |
| Melvin Tchiknavorian | Men's | 1:07.34 | 5 | 3 | Did not advance | | | 17 |
| Terence Tchiknavorian | Men's | 1:07.74 | 12 | 2 Q | 2 Q | 3 FB | 1 | 5 |

Women

| Athlete | Event | Seeding | | 1/8 final | Quarterfinal | Semifinal | Final | |
| Athlete | Event | Time | Rank | Position | Position | Position | Position | Rank |
|---|---|---|---|---|---|---|---|---|
| Mylène Ballet-Baz | Women's | 1:14.27 | 18 | 2 Q | 4 | Did not advance | | 15 |
| Marielle Berger Sabbatel | Women's | 1:14.23 | 17 | 2 Q | 2 Q | 2 FA | 4 | 4 |
| Anouck Errard | Women's | 1:13.67 | 12 | 2 Q | 3 | Did not advance | | 11 |
| Jade Grillet Aubert | Women's | 1:12.89 | 6 | 1 Q | 2 Q | 4 FB | 2 | 6 |

== Ice hockey ==
Summary

Key:

- OT – Overtime
- GWS – Match decided by penalty-shootout

| Team | Event | Group stage | | | | | Qualification playoff | Quarterfinal | Semifinal | Final / BM | |
| Team | Event | Opposition Score | Opposition Score | Opposition Score | Opposition Score | Rank | Opposition Score | Opposition Score | Opposition Score | Opposition Score | Rank |
|---|---|---|---|---|---|---|---|---|---|---|---|
| France men's | Men's | Switzerland; L 0–4 | Czech Republic; L 3–6 | Canada; L 2–10 | —N/a | 4 Q | Germany; L 1–5 | Did not advance | | | 11 |
| France women's | Women's | Italy; L 1–4 | Japan; L 2–3 | Sweden; L 0–4 | Germany; L 1–2^{OT} | 5 | —N/a | Did not advance | | | 10 |

=== Men's tournament ===
France men's national ice hockey team officially failed to qualify after finishing second in the final qualification tournament, but Russia is not allowed to participate in the Olympic tournament, France will take its place as the best-ranked second place team.

Roster

The first six players of France's roster were announced on 16 June 2025. France's full roster was later revealed on 23 December 2025. Pierre-Édouard Bellemare served as France's captain, continuing in the role from Olympic qualifiers in 2024. Yohann Auvitu, Stéphane Da Costa, and Alexandre Texier served as alternate captains.

Head coach: Yorick Treille

| No. | Pos. | Name | Height | Weight | Birthdate | Team |
|---|---|---|---|---|---|---|
| 3 | F | Charles Bertrand | 1.85 m (6 ft 1 in) | 92 kg (203 lb) | 5 February 1991 (aged 34) | (Finland) Vaasan Sport |
| 5 | D | Enzo Guebey | 1.83 m (6 ft 0 in) | 88 kg (194 lb) | 6 May 1999 (aged 26) | (Switzerland) HC Davos |
| 7 | D | Pierre Crinon | 1.96 m (6 ft 5 in) | 102 kg (225 lb) | 2 August 1995 (aged 29) | (France) Brûleurs de Loups |
| 8 | D | Hugo Gallet | 1.93 m (6 ft 4 in) | 93 kg (205 lb) | 20 June 1997 (aged 28) | (Finland) KalPa |
| 14 | F | Stéphane Da Costa – A | 1.80 m (5 ft 11 in) | 82 kg (181 lb) | 11 July 1989 (aged 36) | (Russia) Avtomobilist Yekaterinburg |
| 18 | D | Yohann Auvitu – A | 1.83 m (6 ft 0 in) | 88 kg (194 lb) | 27 July 1989 (aged 36) | (Austria) Black Wings Linz |
| 19 | D | Enzo Cantagallo | 1.80 m (5 ft 11 in) | 85 kg (187 lb) | 19 October 1998 (aged 27) | (France) Spartiates de Marseille |
| 24 | F | Justin Addamo | 1.98 m (6 ft 6 in) | 112 kg (247 lb) | 27 May 1998 (aged 27) | (Finland) Jukurit |
| 25 | F | Nicolas Ritz | 1.80 m (5 ft 11 in) | 88 kg (194 lb) | 26 February 1992 (aged 33) | (France) Ducs d'Angers |
| 27 | D | Jules Boscq | 1.83 m (6 ft 0 in) | 81 kg (179 lb) | 22 February 2002 (aged 23) | (France) Boxers de Bordeaux |
| 29 | F | Louis Boudon | 1.80 m (5 ft 11 in) | 85 kg (187 lb) | 4 October 1998 (aged 26) | (Finland) Jukurit |
| 30 | G | Antoine Keller | 1.88 m (6 ft 2 in) | 74 kg (163 lb) | 6 October 2004 (aged 21) | (Switzerland) HC Ajoie |
| 33 | G | Julian Junca | 1.96 m (6 ft 5 in) | 97 kg (214 lb) | 15 February 1998 (aged 27) | (Slovakia) Dukla Trenčín |
| 36 | G | Martin Neckar | 1.83 m (6 ft 0 in) | 80 kg (176 lb) | 12 September 2005 (aged 20) | (Switzerland) SCL Tigers |
| 41 | F | Pierre-Édouard Bellemare – C | 1.83 m (6 ft 0 in) | 84 kg (185 lb) | 6 March 1985 (aged 40) | (Switzerland) HC Ajoie |
| 62 | D | Florian Chakiachvili | 1.85 m (6 ft 1 in) | 86 kg (190 lb) | 18 March 1992 (aged 33) | (France) Dragons de Rouen |
| 72 | F | Jordann Perret | 1.78 m (5 ft 10 in) | 81 kg (179 lb) | 15 October 1994 (aged 31) | (Czech Republic) Mountfield HK |
| 74 | D | Thomas Thiry | 1.91 m (6 ft 3 in) | 105 kg (231 lb) | 9 September 1997 (aged 27) | (Switzerland) HC Ajoie |
| 77 | F | Sacha Treille | 1.91 m (6 ft 3 in) | 80 kg (176 lb) | 6 November 1987 (aged 37) | (France) Brûleurs de Loups |
| 78 | F | Dylan Fabre | 1.78 m (5 ft 10 in) | 78 kg (172 lb) | 10 November 2000 (aged 24) | (Finland) Porin Ässät |
| 81 | F | Anthony Rech | 1.80 m (5 ft 11 in) | 86 kg (190 lb) | 9 July 1992 (aged 32) | (France) Dragons de Rouen |
| 85 | F | Alexandre Texier – A | 1.85 m (6 ft 1 in) | 88 kg (194 lb) | 13 September 1999 (aged 26) | (Canada) Montreal Canadiens |
| 90 | F | Aurélien Dair | 1.88 m (6 ft 2 in) | 84 kg (185 lb) | 10 September 1999 (aged 25) | (France) Brûleurs de Loups |
| 91 | F | Floran Douay | 1.91 m (6 ft 3 in) | 98 kg (216 lb) | 7 February 1995 (aged 30) | (Switzerland) Lausanne HC |
| 95 | F | Kévin Bozon | 1.88 m (6 ft 2 in) | 90 kg (198 lb) | 30 December 1995 (aged 29) | (Switzerland) HC Ajoie |

Group play

| Pos | Team | Pld | W | OTW | OTL | L | GF | GA | GD | Pts | Qualification |
|---|---|---|---|---|---|---|---|---|---|---|---|
| 1 | Canada | 3 | 3 | 0 | 0 | 0 | 20 | 3 | +17 | 9 | Advance to quarterfinals |
| 2 | Switzerland | 3 | 1 | 1 | 0 | 1 | 9 | 8 | +1 | 5 | Advance to qualification playoffs |
| 3 | Czechia | 3 | 1 | 0 | 1 | 1 | 9 | 12 | −3 | 4 | Advance to qualification playoffs |
| 4 | France | 3 | 0 | 0 | 0 | 3 | 5 | 20 | −15 | 0 | Advance to qualification playoffs |

Source: IIHF
Rules for classification: Tiebreak criteria

| 12 February 2026; 12:10 | Switzerland | 4–0 (2–0, 0–0, 2–0) | France | PalaItalia, Milan; Attendance: 10,627 |

Game reference

Leonardo Genoni
Goalies
Antoine Keller
Referees:
(United States) Brian Pochmara
(Germany) André Schrader
Linesmen:
(United States) Jake Davis
(United States) Jonny Murray

| Riat (Andrighetto, Kurashev) (PP) – 00:55 | 1–0 |
| Moser (Fora) – 03:06 | 2–0 |
| Meier (Josi, Kukan) – 50:08 | 3–0 |
| Meier (Moser, Fiala) – 56:13 | 4–0 |

8 min
Penalties
10 min
43
Shots
27

| 13 February 2026; 16:40 | France | 3–6 (0–2, 3–2, 0–2) | Czechia | PalaItalia, Milan; Attendance: 11,174 |

Game reference

Martin Neckar
Julian Junca
Goalies
Daniel Vladař
Referees:
(Latvia) Andris Ansons
(Canada) Eric Furlatt
Linesmen:
(Canada) Matt MacPherson
(Canada) Tarrington Wyonzek

| | 0–1 | 05:56 – Nečas (Pastrňák, Hronek) (PP) |
| | 0–2 | 13:04 – Kempný (Stránský, Faksa) |
| Boudon (Da Costa, Auvitu) (PP) – 21:01 | 1–2 |
| Boudon (Bertrand) – 24:04 | 2–2 |
| Gallet (Bertrand, Boudon) – 25:54 | 3–2 |
| | 3–3 | 33:23 – Pastrňák (Palát, Kempný) |
| | 3–4 | 39:28 – Stránský (Faksa, Hronek) (SH) |
| | 3–5 | 41:05 – Chlapík (Nečas, Kämpf) |
| | 3–6 | 41:53 – Červenka (Sedlák, Špaček) |

6 min
Penalties
4 min
12
Shots
38

| 15 February 2026; 16:40 | Canada | 10–2 (3–1, 3–0, 4–1) | France | PalaItalia, Milan; Attendance: 11,498 |

Game reference

Jordan Binnington
Goalies
Julian Junca
Antoine Keller
Referees:
(Sweden) Christopher Holm
(United States) Kyle Rehman
Linesmen:
(United States) Ryan Daisy
(Czech Republic) Daniel Hynek

| Wilson (Doughty, McDavid) – 08:41 | 1–0 |
| | 1–1 | 08:54 – Douay (Addamo) |
| Toews (Crosby, Makar) – 09:33 | 2–1 |
| Stone (SH) – 19:56 | 3–1 |
| Makar (McDavid, Crosby) (PP) – 32:10 | 4–1 |
| Celebrini (PS) – 37:16 | 5–1 |
| Crosby (Stone) – 37:35 | 6–1 |
| McDavid (Celebrini, Wilson) – 40:20 | 7–1 |
| | 7–2 | 41:28 – Treille (Addamo, Crinon) |
| Horvat (Reinhart, Bennett) – 45:14 | 8–2 |
| Hagel (MacKinnon, Theodore) – 50:46 | 9–2 |
| Celebrini (Stone, Marner) (PP) – 51:47 | 10–2 |

33 min
Penalties
35 min
46
Shots
14

Qualification play-offs

| 17 February 2026; 12:10 | Germany | 5–1 (3–0, 0–1, 2–0) | France | PalaItalia, Milan; Attendance: 9,788 |

Game reference

Philipp Grubauer
Goalies
Julian Junca
Antoine Keller
Referees:
(Canada) Michael Campbell
(Sweden) Christopher Holm
Linesmen:
(Denmark) Albert Ankerstjerne
(Canada) David Brisebois

| Draisaitl (Samanski, Stützle) (PP) – 03:40 | 1–0 |
| Tiffels – 10:54 | 2–0 |
| Peterka (Stützle) – 18:13 | 3–0 |
| | 3–1 | 24:02 – Bellemare (Perret) |
| Samanski (Draisaitl, Seider) (PP) – 47:01 | 4–1 |
| Sturm (Draisaitl, Rieder) (EN) – 59:04 | 5–1 |

4 min
Penalties
6 min
36
Shots
31

=== Women's tournament ===
France women's national ice hockey team officially failed to qualify after finishing second in the final qualification tournament, but Russia is not allowed to participate in the Olympic tournament, France will take its place as the best-ranked second place team.

Roster

The roster was announced on 23 December 2025.

Head coach: Grégory Tarlé

| No. | Pos. | Name | Height | Weight | Birthdate | Team |
|---|---|---|---|---|---|---|
| 1 | G | Margaux Mameri | 1.61 m (5 ft 3 in) | 58 kg (128 lb) | 12 April 1997 (aged 28) | (France) Les Comètes de Meudon |
| 5 | D | Gabrielle De Serres | 1.73 m (5 ft 8 in) | 70 kg (150 lb) | 29 January 1998 (aged 28) | (Canada) Sudbury Lady Wolves |
| 6 | F | Margot Huot-Marchand | 1.60 m (5 ft 3 in) | 73 kg (161 lb) | 10 June 2000 (aged 25) | (Sweden) Rögle BK |
| 7 | D | Lucie Quarto | 1.67 m (5 ft 6 in) | 66 kg (146 lb) | 7 September 2002 (aged 23) | (United States) Lindenwood Lady Lions |
| 8 | F | Jade Barbirati | 1.67 m (5 ft 6 in) | 67 kg (148 lb) | 6 January 2004 (aged 22) | (United States) Quinnipiac Bobcats |
| 10 | D | Sophie Leclerc | 1.64 m (5 ft 5 in) | 64 kg (141 lb) | 14 August 1997 (aged 28) | (France) Brûleurs de Loups |
| 11 | D | Léa Villiot | 1.65 m (5 ft 5 in) | 64 kg (141 lb) | 11 February 1997 (aged 28) | (Germany) ERC Ingolstadt |
| 12 | F | Estelle Duvin – A | 1.71 m (5 ft 7 in) | 65 kg (143 lb) | 1 February 1997 (aged 29) | (Switzerland) SC Bern |
| 13 | D | Marie-Pierre Pelissou | 1.73 m (5 ft 8 in) | 67 kg (148 lb) | 31 August 1995 (aged 30) | (Switzerland) HC Davos Ladies |
| 16 | F | Clara Rozier – A | 1.61 m (5 ft 3 in) | 57 kg (126 lb) | 28 August 1997 (aged 28) | (Switzerland) SC Bern |
| 17 | F | Chloé Aurard-Bushee | 1.68 m (5 ft 6 in) | 61 kg (134 lb) | 15 March 1999 (aged 26) | (Switzerland) ZSC Lions |
| 18 | F | Anaé Simon | 1.70 m (5 ft 7 in) | 65 kg (143 lb) | 16 December 2002 (aged 23) | (France) Lyon Hockey Club |
| 19 | F | Lore Baudrit – C | 1.90 m (6 ft 3 in) | 86 kg (190 lb) | 11 October 1991 (aged 34) | (Germany) ERC Ingolstadt |
| 21 | F | Julia Mesplède | 1.60 m (5 ft 3 in) | 55 kg (121 lb) | 12 October 2002 (aged 23) | (United States) Vermont Catamounts |
| 22 | F | Manon le Scodan | 1.70 m (5 ft 7 in) | 66 kg (146 lb) | 25 December 2004 (aged 21) | (United States) Clarkson Golden Knights |
| 24 | F | Emma Nonnenmacher | 1.70 m (5 ft 7 in) | 60 kg (130 lb) | 21 August 2004 (aged 21) | (Canada) Concordia Stingers |
| 29 | D | Lea Berger | 1.77 m (5 ft 10 in) | 63 kg (139 lb) | 29 October 2003 (aged 22) | (Canada) Montreal Carabins |
| 31 | G | Violette Pianel-Couriaut | 1.73 m (5 ft 8 in) | 68 kg (150 lb) | 9 May 2006 (aged 19) | (France) Villard-de-Lans U20 |
| 32 | G | Alice Philbert | 1.67 m (5 ft 6 in) | 54 kg (119 lb) | 10 November 1996 (aged 29) | (Italy) EV Bozen Eagles |
| 44 | F | Anais Peyne-Dingival | 1.67 m (5 ft 6 in) | 70 kg (150 lb) | 29 May 2007 (aged 18) | (Canada) John Abbott College |
| 55 | F | Sehana Galbrun | 1.69 m (5 ft 7 in) | 60 kg (130 lb) | 14 September 2005 (aged 20) | (Finland) HIFK |
| 85 | F | Clémence Boudin | 1.63 m (5 ft 4 in) | 56 kg (123 lb) | 1 June 2008 (aged 17) | (France) Sporting Hockey Club Saint Gervais |
| 91 | D | Elina Zilliox | 1.67 m (5 ft 6 in) | 70 kg (150 lb) | 14 May 2005 (aged 20) | (United States) Lindenwood Lady Lions |

Group play

| Pos | Team | Pld | W | OTW | OTL | L | GF | GA | GD | Pts | Qualification |
|---|---|---|---|---|---|---|---|---|---|---|---|
| 1 | Sweden | 4 | 4 | 0 | 0 | 0 | 18 | 2 | +16 | 12 | Quarter-finals |
| 2 | Germany | 4 | 2 | 1 | 0 | 1 | 10 | 8 | +2 | 8 | Quarter-finals |
| 3 | Italy (H) | 4 | 2 | 0 | 0 | 2 | 9 | 11 | −2 | 6 | Quarter-finals |
| 4 | Japan | 4 | 1 | 0 | 0 | 3 | 7 | 14 | −7 | 3 | Eliminated |
| 5 | France | 4 | 0 | 0 | 1 | 3 | 4 | 13 | −9 | 1 | Eliminated |

Source: IIHF
Rules for classification: Tiebreakers
(H) Host

| 5 February 2026; 14:40 v | Italy | 4–1 (1–1, 1–0, 2–0) | France | PalaItalia, Milan; Attendance: 9,356 |

Game reference

Martina Fedel
Goalies
Alice Philbert
Referees:
(United States) Kelly Cooke
(Canada) Elizabeth Mantha
Linesmen:
(United States) Jennifer Cameron
(Canada) Laura Gutauskas

| | 0–1 | 09:42 – De Serres (Rozier) (PP) |
| Tutino (Mattivi) – 10:42 | 1–1 |
| Roccella (Della Rovere, Lobis) – 35:17 | 2–1 |
| Fantin – 40:14 | 3–1 |
| Della Rovere (Caumo) – 44:59 | 4–1 |

6 min
Penalties
6 min
46
Shots
15

| 6 February 2026; 12:10 v | France | 2–3 (0–0, 1–1, 1–2) | Japan | Fiera Milano, Milan; Attendance: 3,424 |

Game reference

Alice Philbert
Goalies
Miyuu Masuhara
Referees:
(United States) Melissa Doyle
(Canada) Michelle McKenna
Linesmen:
(Czech Republic) Kristýna Hájková
(Canada) Kirsten Welsh

| | 0–1 | 38:34 – Ukita (Ak. Shiga, Sato) |
| Baudrit (Le Scodan, Peyne-Dingival) – 39:42 | 1–1 |
| | 1–2 | 56:30 – Ito (Koyama, Miura) |
| | 1–3 | 57:50 – Maeda (Rir. Noro) (EN) |
| De Serres (Duvin, Aurard-Bushee) (PP, EA) – 59:48 | 2–3 |

2 min
Penalties
2 min
25
Shots
28

| 8 February 2026; 16:40 v | France | 0–4 (0–3, 0–1, 0–0) | Sweden | Fiera Milano, Milan; Attendance: 3,868 |

Game reference

Alice Philbert
Goalies
Emma Söderberg
Referees:
(Finland) Anniina Nurmi
(Czech Republic) Zuzana Svobodová
Linesmen:
(United States) Jennifer Cameron
(Sweden) Jessica Lundgren

| 0–1 | 03:30 – T. Johansson (Svensson, Olsson) |
| 0–2 | 07:08 – Hjalmarsson (Olsson, Svensson) (PP) |
| 0–3 | 13:14 – Thuvik (L. Johansson) |
| 0–4 | 20:45 – L. Johansson (Thuvik, Hjalmarsson) |

10 min
Penalties
6 min
14
Shots
49

| 9 February 2026; 16:40 v | Germany | 2–1 OT (1–0, 0–0, 0–1) (OT: 1–0) | France | Fiera Milano, Milan; Attendance: 3,632 |

Game reference

Sandra Abstreiter
Goalies
Alice Philbert
Referees:
(United States) Melissa Doyle
(Czech Republic) Zuzana Svobodová
Linesmen:
(Canada) Alexandra Clarke
(Canada) Justine Todd

| Kluge (Gleißner, Hadraschek) (PP) – 19:25 | 1–0 |
| | 1–1 | 48:21 – Duvin (Le Scodan) |
| Jobst-Smith (Li. Welcke, Lu. Welcke) – 61:07 | 2–1 |

6 min
Penalties
10 min
47
Shots
14

== Nordic combined ==
| Athlete | Event | Ski jumping | | | Cross-country | | Total | |
| Athlete | Event | Distance | Points | Rank | Time | Rank | Time | Rank |
|---|---|---|---|---|---|---|---|---|
| Marco Heinis | Individual normal hill | 97.0 | 118.1 | 17 | 33:12.3 | 24 | 34:10.3 | 22 |
| Marco Heinis | Individual large hill | 129.0 | 133.8 | 10 | 26:03.9 | 17 | 27:08.9 | 14 |
| Laurent Muhlethaler | Individual normal hill | 93.0 | 111.1 | 23 | 34:20.5 | 30 | 35:46.5 | 29 |
| Laurent Muhlethaler | Individual large hill | 126.0 | 125.4 | 17 | 26:28.9 | 23 | 28:06.9 | 20 |
| Maël Tyrode | Individual normal hill | 88.5 | 105.1 | 28 | 32:45.3 | 21 | 34:35.3 | 25 |
| Maël Tyrode | Individual large hill | 123.0 | 118.5 | 24 | 25:42.3 | 15 | 27:48.3 | 17 |
| Maël Tyrode; Marco Heinis | Team large hill | 235.5 | 222.7 | 6 | 44:07.0 | 10 | 44:39.0 | 9 |

== Short-track speed skating ==
France qualified six short-track speed skaters (two men and four women) after the conclusion of the 2025–26 ISU Short Track World Tour.

Men

| Athlete | Event | Heat | | Quarterfinal | | Semifinal | | Final | |
| Athlete | Event | Time | Rank | Time | Rank | Time | Rank | Time | Rank |
|---|---|---|---|---|---|---|---|---|---|
| Etienne Bastier | 1000 m | 1:25.908 | 4 | Did not advance | | | | | 25 |
| Quentin Fercoq | 1000 m | 1:25.818 | 2 Q | PEN | | Did not advance | | | 20 |
| Etienne Bastier | 1500 m | —N/a | | 2:23.760 | 4 | Did not advance | | | 23 |
| Quentin Fercoq | 1500 m | —N/a | | 2:18.492 | 5 | Did not advance | | | 25 |

Qualification legend: Q - Qualify based on position in heat; q - Qualify based on time in field; FA - Qualify to medal final; FB - Qualify to consolation final; ADV - Advanced on referee decision; PEN - Penalty, not advanced on referee decision

Women

| Athlete | Event | Heat | | Quarterfinal | | Semifinal | | Final | |
| Athlete | Event | Time | Rank | Time | Rank | Time | Rank | Time | Rank |
|---|---|---|---|---|---|---|---|---|---|
| Bérénice Comby | 500 m | 42.750 | 3 q | 56.076 | 4 | Did not advance | | | 15 |
| Aurélie Lévêque | 500 m | 44.488 | 3 | Did not advance | | | | | 22 |
| Aurélie Lévêque | 1000 m | 1:32.394 | 4 | Did not advance | | | | | 31 |
| Cloé Ollivier | 1000 m | 1:28.603 | 2 Q | 1:28.964 | 5 | Did not advance | | | 17 |
| Aurélie Lévêque | 1500 m | —N/a | | 2:30.023 | 3 Q | 2:54.173 | 5 | Did not advance | 16 |
| Cloé Ollivier | 1500 m | —N/a | | PEN | | Did not advance | | | 33 |
| Bérénice Comby; Eva Grenouilloux; Aurélie Lévêque; Cloé Ollivier | 3000 m relay | —N/a | | | | 4:08.826 | 4 FB | 4:12.272 | 7 |

Qualification legend: Q - Qualify based on position in heat; q - Qualify based on time in field; FA - Qualify to medal final; FB - Qualify to consolation final; ADV - Advanced on referee decision; PEN - Penalty, not advanced on referee decision

Mixed

| Athlete | Event | Quarterfinal | | Semifinal | | Final | |
| Athlete | Event | Time | Rank | Time | Rank | Time | Rank |
|---|---|---|---|---|---|---|---|
| Etienne Bastier; Bérénice Comby; Quentin Fercoq; Aurélie Lévêque; Cloé Ollivier | 2000 m relay | 2.46.871 | 3 ADV | 3.05.547 | 4 FB | 2.47.708 | 7 |

Qualification legend: Q - Qualify based on position in heat; q - Qualify based on time in field; FA - Qualify to medal final; FB - Qualify to consolation final; ADV - Advanced on referee decision

== Skeleton ==
| Athlete | Event | Run 1 | | Run 2 | | Run 3 | | Run 4 | | Total | |
| Athlete | Event | Time | Rank | Time | Rank | Time | Rank | Time | Rank | Time | Rank |
|---|---|---|---|---|---|---|---|---|---|---|---|
| Lucas Defayet | Men's | 57.63 | 20 | 57.66 | 21 | 57.21 | 20 | 57.19 | 19 | 3:49.69 | 19 |

== Ski jumping ==
Men
Individual

| Athlete | Event | First round | | | Final round | | | Total | |
| Athlete | Event | Distance | Points | Rank | Distance | Points | Rank | Points | Rank |
|---|---|---|---|---|---|---|---|---|---|
| Jules Chervet | Normal hill | 96 | 112.7 | 43 | Did not advance | | | | |
| Jules Chervet | Large hill | 128.5 | 119.1 | 33 | Did not advance | | | | |
| Valentin Foubert | Normal hill | 102.5 | 134.6 | 2 Q | 102.5 | 128.7 | 16 | 263.3 | 5 |
| Valentin Foubert | Large hill | 127.0 | 130.3 | 16 Q | 129.0 | 126.6 | 19 | 256.9 | 17 |
| Enzo Milesi | Normal hill | 99.5 | 124.0 | =25 Q | 95.5 | 117.4 | 30 | 241.4 | 30 |
| Enzo Milesi | Large hill | 122.5 | 107.6 | 43 | Did not advance | | | | |

Team

| Athlete | Event | First round | | | Second round | | | Final round | | | Total | |
| Athlete | Event | Distance | Points | Rank | Distance | Points | Rank | Distance | Points | Rank | Points | Rank |
|---|---|---|---|---|---|---|---|---|---|---|---|---|
| Jules Chervet; Valentin Foubert | Super team large hill | 255.5 | 245.3 | 12 Q | 240.0 | 232.3 | 11 | Cancelled | | | 477.6 | 12 |

Women

| Athlete | Event | First round | | | Final round | | | Total | |
| Athlete | Event | Distance | Points | Rank | Distance | Points | Rank | Points | Rank |
|---|---|---|---|---|---|---|---|---|---|
| Emma Chervet | Normal hill | 84.5 | 94.1 | 43 | Did not advance | | | | |
| Emma Chervet | Large hill | 104.0 | 75.3 | 46 | Did not advance | | | | |
| Joséphine Pagnier | Normal hill | 91.0 | 111.2 | 27 | 92.0 | 103.1 | 27 | 214.3 | 29 |
| Joséphine Pagnier | Large hill | 118.0 | 93.3 | 34 | Did not advance | | | | |

Mixed

| Athlete | Event | First round | | | Final | | | Total | |
| Athlete | Event | Distance | Points | Rank | Distance | Points | Rank | Points | Rank |
|---|---|---|---|---|---|---|---|---|---|
| Emma Chervet; Enzo Milesi; Joséphine Pagnier; Valentin Foubert | Mixed team | 372.0 | 457.9 | 9 | Did not advance | | | | |

== Ski mountaineering ==
France qualified two female and two male ski mountaineers through the 2025 ISMF World Championships.

| Athlete | Event | Heat | | Semifinal | | Final | |
| Athlete | Event | Time | Rank | Time | Rank | Time | Rank |
|---|---|---|---|---|---|---|---|
| Thibault Anselmet | Men's sprint | 2:46.98 | 2 Q | 2:37.17 | 3 q | 2:36.34 | 3rd place, bronze medalist(s) |
| Pablo Giner Dalmasso | Men's sprint | 2:42.37 | 3 Q | 2:41.29 | 4 | Did not advance | 7 |
| Emily Harrop | Women's sprint | 3:03.34 | 1 Q | 3:06.57 | 1 Q | 3:02.15 | 2nd place, silver medalist(s) |
| Margot Ravinel | Women's sprint | 3:07.84 | 2 Q | 3:10.13 | 1 Q | 3:18.27 | 6 |
| Thibault Anselmet; Emily Harrop | Mixed relay | —N/a | | | | 26:57.44 | 1st place, gold medalist(s) |

== Snowboarding ==
Cross
Men

| Athlete | Event | Seeding | | 1/8 final | Quarterfinal | Semifinal | Final | |
| Athlete | Event | Time | Rank | Position | Position | Position | Position | Rank |
|---|---|---|---|---|---|---|---|---|
| Loan Bozzolo | Men's | 1:08.22 | 5 | 1 Q | 2 Q | 4 FB | 1 | 5 |
| Aidan Chollet | Men's | 1:06.37 | 1 | 2 Q | 2 Q | 1 FA | 4 | 4 |
| Jonas Chollet | Men's | 1:08.04 | 4 | 1 Q | 1 Q | 3 FB | 2 | 6 |
| Merlin Surget | Men's | 1:15.89 | 32 | 1 Q | 3 | Did not advance | | 12 |

Women

| Athlete | Event | Seeding | | 1/8 final | Quarterfinal | Semifinal | Final | |
| Athlete | Event | Time | Rank | Position | Position | Position | Position | Rank |
|---|---|---|---|---|---|---|---|---|
| Léa Casta | Women's | 1:12.79 | 2 | 1 Q | 1 Q | 4 FB | 4 | 8 |
| Maja-Li Iafrate Danielsson | Women's | 1:15.05 | 14 | 2 Q | 4 | Did not advance | | 15 |
| Julia Nirani-Pereira | Women's | 1:13.32 | 4 | 1 Q | 1 Q | 4 FB | 2 | 6 |
| Chloé Trespeuch | Women's | 1:13.49 | 5 | 1 Q | 3 | Did not advance | | 9 |

Mixed

| Athlete | Event | Quarterfinal | Semifinal | Final | |
| Athlete | Event | Position | Position | Position | Rank |
|---|---|---|---|---|---|
| Aidan Chollet; Julia Nirani-Pereira | Team snowboard cross | 2 Q | 4 | Did not advance | 5 |
| Loan Bozzolo; Léa Casta | Team snowboard cross | 1 Q | 2 FA | 3 | 3rd place, bronze medalist(s) |
| Jonas Chollet; Chloé Trespeuch | Team snowboard cross | 3 | Did not advance | | 10 |

Qualification legend: Q - Qualify to next round; FA - Qualify to medal final; FB - Qualify to consolation final

Park & Pipe

| Athlete | Event | Qualification | | | | | Final | | | | |
| Athlete | Event | Run 1 | Run 2 | Run 3 | Best/Total | Rank | Run 1 | Run 2 | Run 3 | Best/Total | Rank |
|---|---|---|---|---|---|---|---|---|---|---|---|
| Romain Allemand | Men's big air | 15.50 | 89.75 | 67.25 | 157.00 | 17 | Did not advance | | | | |
| Romain Allemand | Men's slopestyle | 76.05 | 36.93 | —N/a | 76.05 | 7 Q | 76.95 | 52.28 | 35.06 | 76.95 | 5 |
| Enzo Valax | Men's big air | 12.00 | 51.50 | 58.25 | 109.75 | 27 | Did not advance | | | | |
| Enzo Valax | Men's slopestyle | 33.40 | 34.26 | —N/a | 34.26 | 24 | Did not advance | | | | |

== Speed skating ==
France qualified six speed skaters (five men and one woman) through performances at the 2025-26 ISU Speed Skating World Cup.

| Athlete | Event | Race | |
| Athlete | Event | Time | Rank |
|---|---|---|---|
| Valentin Thiébault | Men's 1500 m | 1:46.12 | 17 |
| Timothy Loubineaud | Men's 5000 m | 6:11.15 | 5 |
| Timothy Loubineaud | Men's 10,000 m | 12:44.20 | 4 |
| Violette Braun | Women's 3000 m | 4:07.17 | 16 |

Mass start

| Athlete | Event | Semifinal | | | Final | | |
| Athlete | Event | Points | Time | Rank | Points | Time | Rank |
|---|---|---|---|---|---|---|---|
| Timothy Loubineaud | Men's | 61 | 7:47.23 | 1 Q | 0 | 8:06.93 | 11 |
| Mathieu Belloir | Men's | 10 | 7:43.78 | 5 Q | 1 | 8:12.96 | 7 |
| Violette Braun | Women's | 0 | 8:50.91 | 14 | Did not advance | | 26 |

Team pursuit

| Athlete | Event | Quarterfinal | | Semifinal | | Final | |
| Athlete | Event | Opposition Time | Rank | Opposition Time | Rank | Opposition Time | Rank |
|---|---|---|---|---|---|---|---|
| Germain Deschamps; Timothy Loubineaud; Valentin Thiébault | Men's | Netherlands; 3:42.70 | 5 | —N/a | | Norway; 3:43.90 | 5 |

== See also ==
- France at the 2026 Winter Paralympics
