= Short-track speed skating at the 2026 Winter Olympics – Women's 3000 metre relay =

Women's 3000 metre relay at the XXV Olympic Winter Games
- Short-track speed skating
- Venue: Forum di Milano, Milan
- Date: 14 and 18 February
- Competitors: 35 from 8 nations

Medalists
1st place, gold medalist(s)		Choi Min-jeong; Kim Gil-li; Shim Suk-hee; Lee So-yeon; Noh Do-hee	South Korea
2nd place, silver medalist(s)		Elisa Confortola; Arianna Fontana; Chiara Betti; Arianna Sighel	Italy
3rd place, bronze medalist(s)		Danaé Blais; Florence Brunelle; Kim Boutin; Courtney Sarault	Canada

The women's 3000 metre relay competition in short-track speed skating at the 2026 Winter Olympics was held on 14 February (Semifinals) and 18 February 2026 (Finals) at the Forum di Milano in Milan. Choi Min-jeong, Kim Gil-li, Shim Suk-hee, Lee So-yeon, and Noh Do-hee (with Lee only skating in the semifinal), representing South Korea, won the event. Italy was second and Canada third.

Fontana won her third medal at these Olympics and her fourteenth overall, becoming Italy's most decorated Olympic athlete of all time.

== Background ==
The defending champions were the Netherlands. South Korea were the 2022 silver medalists, and China the bronze medalists. Before the Olympics, the Netherlands were leading the 2025–26 ISU Short Track World Tour women's relay standings. Canada were the 2025 World champion in women's relay.

== Qualification ==
Countries qualified for the relay competition at the Winter Olympics during the 2025–26 ISU Short Track World Tour. A total of 8 nations qualified for the event.

== Records ==
Prior to this competition, the world and Olympic records were as follows.

World record	Netherlands; Suzanne Schulting; Xandra Velzeboer; Selma Poutsma; Yara van Kerkhof	4:02.809	Beijing, China	23 October 2021
Olympic record	Netherlands; Suzanne Schulting; Xandra Velzeboer; Yara van Kerkhof; Selma Poutsma	4:03.409	Beijing, China	13 February 2022

== Results ==
=== Semifinals ===
14 February 2026, 22:00 PM

Rank	Heat	Country	Athletes	Time	Notes
1	1	Netherlands	Xandra Velzeboer; Michelle Velzeboer; Zoë Deltrap; Selma Poutsma	4:06.299	QA
2	1	Italy	Elisa Confortola; Arianna Fontana; Chiara Betti; Arianna Sighel	4:06.550	QA
3	1	United States	Kristen Santos-Griswold; Corinne Stoddard; Julie Letai; Kamryn Lute	4:07.415	QB
4	1	France	Cloé Ollivier; Aurélie Lévêque; Bérénice Comby; Eva Grenouilloux	4:08.826	QB
1	2	South Korea	Choi Min-jeong; Kim Gil-li; Shim Suk-hee; Lee So-yeon	4:04.729	QA
2	2	Canada	Danaé Blais; Florence Brunelle; Kim Boutin; Courtney Sarault	4:04.856	QA
3	2	China	Gong Li; Zhang Chutong; Yang Jingru; Wang Xinran	4:04.978	QB
4	2	Japan	Ami Hirai; Mirei Nakashima; Rika Kanai; Haruna Nagamori	4:09.061	QB

=== Finals ===
==== Final B ====
18 February 2026, 20:50 PM

Rank	Country	Athletes	Time	Notes
1	China	Gong Li; Zhang Chutong; Yang Jingru; Wang Xinran	4:10.446	
2	Japan	Mirei Nakashima; Rika Kanai; Aoi Watanabe; Haruna Nagamori	4:11.385	
3	France	Cloé Ollivier; Aurélie Lévêque; Bérénice Comby; Eva Grenouilloux	4:12.272	
4	United States	Kristen Santos-Griswold; Corinne Stoddard; Eunice Lee; Julie Letai		PEN

==== Final A ====
18 February 2026, 20:59 PM

Rank	Country	Athletes	Time	Notes
1st place, gold medalist(s)	South Korea	Choi Min-jeong; Kim Gil-li; Shim Suk-hee; Noh Do-hee	4:04.014	
2nd place, silver medalist(s)	Italy	Elisa Confortola; Arianna Fontana; Chiara Betti; Arianna Sighel	4:04.107	
3rd place, bronze medalist(s)	Canada	Danaé Blais; Florence Brunelle; Kim Boutin; Courtney Sarault	4:04.314	
4	Netherlands	Xandra Velzeboer; Michelle Velzeboer; Zoë Deltrap; Selma Poutsma	4:09.081	

==== Final ranking ====
Rank	Country	Athletes	SF	FB	FA	Best Time
1st place, gold medalist(s)	South Korea	Choi Min-jeong; Kim Gil-li; Shim Suk-hee; Lee So-yeon; Noh Do-hee	1		1	4:04.014
2nd place, silver medalist(s)	Italy	Elisa Confortola; Arianna Fontana; Chiara Betti; Arianna Sighel	2		2	4:04.107
3rd place, bronze medalist(s)	Canada	Danaé Blais; Florence Brunelle; Kim Boutin; Courtney Sarault	2		3	4:04.314
4	Netherlands	Xandra Velzeboer; Michelle Velzeboer; Zoë Deltrap; Selma Poutsma	1		4	4:06.299
5	China	Gong Li; Zhang Chutong; Yang Jingru; Wang Xinran	3	1		4:04.978
6	Japan	Ami Hirai; Mirei Nakashima; Rika Kanai; Aoi Watanabe; Haruna Nagamori	4	2		4:09.061
7	France	Cloé Ollivier; Aurélie Lévêque; Bérénice Comby; Eva Grenouilloux	4	3		4:08.826
8	United States	Kristen Santos-Griswold; Corinne Stoddard; Eunice Lee; Julie Letai; Kamryn Lute	3	PEN		4:07.415
