= South Korea at the 2026 Winter Olympics =

- Flag of South Korea
- IOC code: KOR
- NOC: Korean Olympic Committee
- Website: www.sports.or.kr (in Korean)

in Milan and Cortina d'Ampezzo, Italy 6 February 2026 – 22 February 2026
- Competitors: 71 (36 men and 35 women) in 12 sports
- Flag bearers (opening): Cha Jun-hwan & Park Ji-woo
- Flag bearers (closing): Hwang Dae-heon & Choi Min-jeong
- Medals Ranked 13th: Gold 3 Silver 4 Bronze 3 Total 10

Winter Olympics appearances (overview)
- 1948; 1952; 1956; 1960; 1964; 1968; 1972; 1976; 1980; 1984; 1988; 1992; 1994; 1998; 2002; 2006; 2010; 2014; 2018; 2022; 2026

Other related appearances
- Korea (2018)

South Korea competed at the 2026 Winter Olympics in Milan and Cortina d'Ampezzo, Italy, from 6 to 22 February 2026.

Cha Jun-hwan and Park Ji-woo were the country's flagbearer during the opening ceremony. Meanwhile, Hwang Dae-heon and Choi Min-jeong were the country's flagbearer during the closing ceremony.

== Competitors ==
The following is the list of number of competitors participating at the Games per sport/discipline.

Sport	Men	Women	Total
Alpine skiing	1	2	3
Biathlon	1	1	2
Bobsleigh	8	2	10
Cross-country skiing	1	2	3
Curling	1	6	7
Figure skating	3	3	6
Freestyle skiing	4	3	7
Luge	0	1	1
Short-track speed skating	5	5	10
Skeleton	2	1	3
Snowboarding	6	5	11
Speed skating	4	4	8
Total	36	35	71

== Medalists ==
Medal	Name	Sport	Event	Date
Gold	Choi Ga-on	Snowboarding	Women's halfpipe	12 February
Gold	Choi Min-jeong; Kim Gil-li; Lee So-Yeon; Noh Do-hee; Shim Suk-hee	Short-track speed skating	Women's 3000 metre relay	18 February
Gold	Kim Gil-li	Short-track speed skating	Women's 1500 m	20 February
Silver	Kim Sang-kyum	Snowboarding	Men's parallel giant slalom	8 February
Silver	Hwang Dae-heon	Short-track speed skating	Men's 1500 metres	14 February
Silver	Choi Min-jeong	Short-track speed skating	Women's 1500 m	20 February
Silver	Hwang Dae-heon; Lee Jeong-min; Lee June-seo; Rim Jong-un; Shin Dong-min	Short-track speed skating	5000 m relay	20 February
Bronze	Yu Seung-eun	Snowboarding	Women's big air	9 February
Bronze	Rim Jong-un	Short-track speed skating	Men's 1000m	12 February
Bronze	Kim Gil-li	Short-track speed skating	Women's 1000m	16 February

Medals by date
Day	Date	1st place, gold medalist(s)	2nd place, silver medalist(s)	3rd place, bronze medalist(s)	Total
2	8 February	0	1	0	1
3	9 February	0	0	1	1
6	12 February	1	0	1	2
8	14 February	0	1	0	1
10	16 February	0	0	1	1
12	18 February	1	0	0	1
14	20 February	1	2	0	3
Total		3	4	3	10

Medals by sport
Sport	1st place, gold medalist(s)	2nd place, silver medalist(s)	3rd place, bronze medalist(s)	Total
Short-track speed skating	2	3	2	7
Snowboarding	1	1	1	3
Total	3	4	3	10

Medals by gender
Gender	1st place, gold medalist(s)	2nd place, silver medalist(s)	3rd place, bronze medalist(s)	Total
Female	3	1	2	6
Male	0	3	1	4
Mixed	0	0	0	0
Total	3	4	3	10

== Alpine skiing ==
South Korea qualified one female and one male alpine skier through the basic quota.

Athlete	Event	Run 1		Run 2		Total	
Athlete	Event	Time	Rank	Time	Rank	Time	Rank
Jung Dong-hyun	Men's giant slalom	1:20.84	37	1:14.57	32	2:35.41	33
Jung Dong-hyun	Men's slalom	DNF					
Gim So-hui	Women's giant slalom	1:09.59	46	1:16.83	42	2:26.42	42
Gim So-hui	Women's slalom	DNF					
Park Seo-yun	Women's giant slalom	DNF					
Park Seo-yun	Women's slalom	DNF					

== Biathlon ==
Athlete	Event	Time	Misses	Rank
Choi Du-jin	Men's individual	1:05:07.6	5 (2+1+2+0)	85
Choi Du-jin	Men's sprint	28:05.7	3 (3+0)	90
Ekaterina Avvakumova	Women's individual	47:18.2	3 (0+0+1+2)	63
Ekaterina Avvakumova	Women's sprint	23:18.3	1 (0+1)	58
Ekaterina Avvakumova	Women's pursuit	35:33.0	2 (1+0+1+0)	55

== Bobsleigh ==
Athlete	Event	Run 1		Run 2		Run 3		Run 4		Total	
Athlete	Event	Time	Rank	Time	Rank	Time	Rank	Time	Rank	Time	Rank
Kim Jin-su*; Kim Hyeong-geun	Two-man	55.53	5	56.16	15	55.90	16	56.01	15	3:43.60	13
Suk Young-jin*; Chae Byung-do	Two-man	56.27	19	56.23	18	56.03	18	56.08	17	3:44.61	19
Kim Jin-su*; Kim Hyeong-geun; Kim Sun-wook; Lee Geon-u	Four-man	54.60	8	54.90	6	54.75	9	54.99	8	3:39.24	8
Suk Young-jin*; Chae Byung-do; Chun Su-hyun; Lee Do-yun	Four-man	55.51	24	55.22	16	55.72	23	DNA		2:46.45	23
Kim Yoo-ran	Monobob	1:00.96	22	1:00.90	22	1:00.51	19	DNA		3:02.37	22
Kim Yoo-ran*; Jeon Eun-ji	Two-woman	57.88	17	57.91	16	58.15	12	58.10	16	3:52.04	16

== Cross-country skiing ==
South Korea qualified one female and one male cross-country skier through the basic quota. Following the completion of the 2024–25 FIS Cross-Country World Cup, South Korea qualified a further one female athlete.

Distance
Men

Athlete	Event	Classical		Freestyle		Final		
Athlete	Event	Time	Rank	Time	Rank	Time	Deficit	Rank
Lee Joon-seo	Men's freestyle	—N/a		24:25.4	73	—N/a		
Lee Joon-seo	Men's skiathlon	26:25.7	55	26:41.2	63	53:39.0	7:28.0	58

Women

Athlete	Event	Classical		Freestyle		Final		
Athlete	Event	Time	Rank	Time	Rank	Time	Deficit	Rank
Han Da-som	Women's freestyle	—N/a		28:15.8	80	—N/a		
Han Da-som	Women's skiathlon	34:11.2	62	Lapped		–	–	65
Lee Eui-jin	Women's freestyle	—N/a		27:35.9	73	—N/a		
Lee Eui-jin	Women's skiathlon	32:24.9	53	Lapped		–	–	54

Sprint

Athlete	Event	Qualification		Quarterfinal		Semifinal		Final	
Athlete	Event	Time	Rank	Time	Rank	Time	Rank	Time	Rank
Lee Joon-seo	Men's sprint	3:32.40	64	Did not advance					
Han Da-som	Women's sprint	DSQ		Did not advance					
Lee Eui-jin	Women's sprint	DSQ		Did not advance					
Han Da-som; Lee Eui-jin	Women's team sprint	7:50.72	23	—N/a				Did not advance	

== Curling ==
Summary

Team	Event	Group stage										Semifinal	Final / BM	
Team	Event	Opposition Score	Opposition Score	Opposition Score	Opposition Score	Opposition Score	Opposition Score	Opposition Score	Opposition Score	Opposition Score	Rank	Opposition Score	Opposition Score	Rank
Gim Eun-ji; Kim Min-ji; Kim Su-ji; Seol Ye-eun; Seol Ye-ji	Women's tournament	USA; L 4–8	ITA; W 7–2	GBR; W 9–3	DEN; L 3–6	JPN; W 7–5	CHN; W 10–9	SUI; L 5–7	SWE; W 8–3	CAN; L 7–10	5	Did not advance		
Kim Seon-yeong; Jeong Yeong-seok	Mixed doubles tournament	SWE; L 3–10	ITA; L 4–8	SUI; L 5–8	GBR; L 2–8	CZE; L 4–9	USA; W 6–5	EST; W 9–3	CAN; W 9–5	NOR; L 5–8	9	Did not advance		

=== Women's tournament ===
South Korea qualified a women's team by finishing in the top seven based on the combined points at the 2024 and 2025 World Championships. Team Gim Eun-ji qualified as Korean representatives by winning the 2025 Korean Curling Championships, finishing 9–2 through the event and defeating Team Ha Seung-youn 7–4 in the championship game.

Final Round Robin Standings
Team	Skip	Pld	W	L	W–L	PF	PA	EW	EL	BE	SE	S%	DSC	Qualification
Sweden	Anna Hasselborg	9	7	2	–	65	50	45	32	5	14	81.7%	25.806	Playoffs
United States	Tabitha Peterson	9	6	3	2–0	60	54	40	37	3	13	82.1%	34.288	Playoffs
Switzerland	Silvana Tirinzoni	9	6	3	1–1	60	51	35	42	6	4	85.0%	44.338	Playoffs
Canada	Rachel Homan	9	6	3	0–2	76	59	45	38	2	9	80.3%	19.781	Playoffs
South Korea	Gim Eun-ji	9	5	4	1–0	60	53	37	35	8	11	81.2%	23.581	
Great Britain	Sophie Jackson	9	5	4	0–1	58	58	36	36	10	8	83.4%	16.938	
Denmark	Madeleine Dupont	9	4	5	–	49	58	36	38	3	11	77.0%	37.875	
Japan	Sayaka Yoshimura	9	2	7	1–1	51	69	35	43	3	6	78.6%	27.513	
Italy	Stefania Constantini	9	2	7	1–1	47	60	34	40	3	4	78.8%	34.719	
China	Wang Rui	9	2	7	1–1	56	70	37	39	3	9	82.7%	41.206	

Source: Official website

Round robin
South Korea had a bye in draws 4, 7 and 11.

Draw 1
Thursday, 12 February, 9:05

Sheet A	1	2	3	4	5	6	7	8	9	10	Final
South Korea (Gim) 🔨	0	1	1	0	0	0	0	2	0	0	4
United States (Peterson)	0	0	0	2	0	1	2	0	1	2	8

Draw 2
Thursday, 12 February, 19:05

Sheet B	1	2	3	4	5	6	7	8	9	10	Final
Italy (Constantini)	0	0	0	0	1	0	1	X	X	X	2
South Korea (Gim) 🔨	0	1	1	1	0	4	0	X	X	X	7

Draw 3
Friday, 13 February, 14:05

Sheet D	1	2	3	4	5	6	7	8	9	10	Final
Great Britain (Jackson)	0	0	2	0	1	0	0	0	X	X	3
South Korea (Gim) 🔨	0	2	0	1	0	3	1	2	X	X	9

Draw 5
Saturday, 14 February, 19:05

Sheet C	1	2	3	4	5	6	7	8	9	10	Final
South Korea (Gim) 🔨	0	0	1	0	1	0	0	1	0	0	3
Denmark (Dupont)	0	1	0	1	0	1	1	0	1	1	6

Draw 6
Sunday, 15 February, 14:05

Sheet A	1	2	3	4	5	6	7	8	9	10	Final
Japan (Yoshimura) 🔨	0	0	0	2	0	1	0	0	2	0	5
South Korea (Gim)	0	1	1	0	1	0	0	3	0	1	7

Draw 8
Monday, 16 February, 19:05

Sheet B	1	2	3	4	5	6	7	8	9	10	Final
South Korea (Gim) 🔨	0	0	3	0	4	0	0	1	0	2	10
China (Wang)	0	0	0	2	0	3	1	0	3	0	9

Draw 9
Tuesday, 17 February, 14:05

Sheet D	1	2	3	4	5	6	7	8	9	10	Final
South Korea (Gim) 🔨	1	0	1	1	0	0	0	1	0	1	5
Switzerland (Tirinzoni)	0	3	0	0	0	1	1	0	2	0	7

Draw 10
Wednesday, 18 February, 9:05

Sheet C	1	2	3	4	5	6	7	8	9	10	Final
Sweden (Hasselborg)	0	0	0	0	1	1	1	X	X	X	3
South Korea (Gim) 🔨	3	1	2	2	0	0	0	X	X	X	8

Draw 12
Thursday, 19 February, 14:30

Sheet B	1	2	3	4	5	6	7	8	9	10	Final
Canada (Homan) 🔨	1	1	0	2	0	4	0	1	0	1	10
South Korea (Gim)	0	0	3	0	1	0	1	0	2	0	7

=== Mixed doubles tournament ===
South Korea qualified a mixed doubles team by finishing second at the Olympic Qualification Event. Kim Seon-yeong and Jeong Yeong-seok qualified as Korean representatives by winning the 2025 Korean Mixed Doubles Curling Championship, finishing 9–1 through the event and defeating the pair of Kim Hye-rin and Yoo Min-hyeon 12–6 in the championship game.

Final Round Robin Standings
Team	Athletes	Pld	W	L	W–L	PF	PA	EW	EL	BE	SE	S%	DSC	Qualification
Great Britain	Jennifer Dodds / Bruce Mouat	9	8	1	–	69	46	37	30	0	11	79.6%	20.931	Playoffs
Italy	Stefania Constantini / Amos Mosaner	9	6	3	1–0	60	50	32	31	1	11	78.3%	27.931	Playoffs
United States	Cory Thiesse / Korey Dropkin	9	6	3	0–1	58	45	36	33	0	12	83.1%	25.900	Playoffs
Sweden	Isabella Wranå / Rasmus Wranå	9	5	4	–	62	55	31	34	0	9	80.1%	19.413	Playoffs
Canada	Jocelyn Peterman / Brett Gallant	9	4	5	2–0	58	52	35	31	0	10	78.5%	36.050	
Norway	Kristin Skaslien / Magnus Nedregotten	9	4	5	1–1	52	47	37	33	0	12	77.1%	24.444	
Switzerland	Briar Schwaller-Hürlimann / Yannick Schwaller	9	4	5	0–2	56	67	32	35	0	6	74.5%	24.000	
Czech Republic	Julie Zelingrová / Vít Chabičovský	9	3	6	1–0	45	62	30	34	0	6	69.1%	16.019	
South Korea	Kim Seon-yeong / Jeong Yeong-seok	9	3	6	0–1	47	64	32	34	0	9	75.1%	42.425	
Estonia	Marie Kaldvee / Harri Lill	9	2	7	–	46	65	32	39	0	7	71.6%	19.300	

Source: Official website

Round robin
South Korea had a bye in draws 3, 5, 7, and 11.

Draw 1
Wednesday, 4 February, 19:05

Sheet A	1	2	3	4	5	6	7	8	Final
Sweden (Wranå / Wranå)	0	2	0	3	4	1	X	X	10
South Korea (Kim / Jeong) 🔨	1	0	2	0	0	0	X	X	3

Draw 2
Thursday, 5 February, 10:05

Sheet D	1	2	3	4	5	6	7	8	Final
South Korea (Kim / Jeong) 🔨	1	0	0	0	1	0	2	X	4
Italy (Constantini / Mosaner)	0	1	2	3	0	2	0	X	8

Draw 4
Thursday, 5 February, 19:05

Sheet B	1	2	3	4	5	6	7	8	Final
Switzerland (Schwaller-Hürlimann / Schwaller) 🔨	1	0	4	0	1	0	2	X	8
South Korea (Kim / Jeong)	0	2	0	1	0	2	0	X	5

Draw 6
Friday, 6 February, 14:35

Sheet C	1	2	3	4	5	6	7	8	Final
South Korea (Kim / Jeong) 🔨	0	0	1	0	0	0	1	X	2
Great Britain (Dodds / Mouat)	2	1	0	2	2	1	0	X	8

Draw 8
Saturday, 7 February, 14:35

Sheet B	1	2	3	4	5	6	7	8	Final
South Korea (Kim / Jeong)	0	1	1	0	0	2	0	X	4
Czech Republic (Zelingrová / Chabičovský) 🔨	2	0	0	2	2	0	3	X	9

Draw 9
Saturday, 7 February, 19:05

Sheet A	1	2	3	4	5	6	7	8	9	Final
South Korea (Kim / Jeong) 🔨	1	1	0	1	0	1	1	0	1	6
United States (Thiesse / Dropkin)	0	0	1	0	1	0	0	3	0	5

Draw 10
Sunday, 8 February, 10:05

Sheet B	1	2	3	4	5	6	7	8	Final
Estonia (Kaldvee / Lill)	0	0	1	0	1	0	1	X	3
South Korea (Kim / Jeong) 🔨	3	2	0	2	0	2	0	X	9

Draw 12
Sunday, 8 February, 19:05

Sheet D	1	2	3	4	5	6	7	8	Final
Canada (Peterman / Gallant)	0	1	2	0	0	2	0	0	5
South Korea (Kim / Jeong) 🔨	1	0	0	3	2	0	2	1	9

Draw 13
Monday, 9 February, 10:05

Sheet C	1	2	3	4	5	6	7	8	Final
Norway (Skaslien / Nedregotten) 🔨	0	0	2	0	0	3	2	1	8
South Korea (Kim / Jeong)	1	2	0	1	1	0	0	0	5

== Figure skating ==
In the 2025 World Figure Skating Championships in Boston, the United States, South Korea secured one quota in each of the men's singles, two quota in each of the women's singles, and one quota in each of the ice dance. South Korea earned one quota in men's singles at the ISU Skate to Milano Figure Skating Qualifier 2025 in Beijing, China. Furthermore, South Korea qualified to the team event.

Athlete	Event	SP/SD		FP/FD		Total	
Athlete	Event	Points	Rank	Points	Rank	Points	Rank
Cha Jun-hwan	Men's singles	92.72	6 Q	181.20	5	273.92	4
Kim Hyun-gyeom	Men's singles	69.30	26	Did not advance			
Lee Hae-in	Women's singles	70.07	9 Q	140.49	8	210.56	8
Shin Ji-a	Women's singles	65.66	14 Q	141.02	7	206.68	11
Hannah Lim; Ye Quan	Ice dance	64.69	22	Did not advance			

Team event

Athlete	Event	Short program / Rhythm dance						Free skate / Free dance				Total	
Athlete	Event	Men's	Women's	Pairs	Ice dance	Total		Men's	Women's	Pairs	Ice dance	Total	
Athlete	Event	Points Team points	Points Team points	Points Team points	Points Team points	Points	Rank	Points Team points	Points Team points	Points Team points	Points Team points	Points	Rank
Cha Jun-hwan (M); Shin Ji-a (W) no entries (P); Hannah Lim / Ye Quan (ID)	Team event	83.53; 3	68.80; 7	WD; 0	70.55; 4	14	7	Did not advance					

== Freestyle skiing ==
Moguls

Athlete	Event	Qualification								Final							
Athlete	Event	Run 1				Run 2				Run 1				Run 2			Rank
Athlete	Event	Time	Points	Total	Rank	Time	Points	Total	Rank	Time	Points	Total	Rank	Time	Points	Total	Rank
Jung Dae-yoon	Men's moguls	22.73	48.10	65.51	27	22.53	59.68	77.36	4 Q	28.87	25.13	34.28	19	Did not advance			
Lee Yoon-seung	Men's moguls	DNF				23.30	52.71	69.35	16	Did not advance							
Yun Shin-ee	Women's moguls	29.56	46.16	59.40	21	28.57	50.05	64.46	14	Did not advance							

Dual moguls

Athlete	Event	1/16 Final	1/8 Final	Quarterfinal	Semifinal	Final	
Athlete	Event	Opposition Result	Opposition Result	Opposition Result	Opposition Result	Opposition Result	Rank
Jung Dae-yoon	Men's dual moguls	Penttala (FIN); W 20–15	Gay (FRA); W 26–9	Kingsbury (CAN); L DNF-35	Did not advance		
Lee Yoon-seung	Men's dual moguls	Walczyk (USA); L 12–23	Did not advance				
Yun Shin-ee	Women's dual moguls	Galysheva (KAZ); L 6–29	Did not advance				

Park & Pipe

Athlete	Event	Qualification					Final				
Athlete	Event	Run 1	Run 2	Run 3	Best	Rank	Run 1	Run 2	Run 3	Best	Rank
Lee Seung-hun	Men's halfpipe	76.00	DNI	—N/a	76.00	10 Q	DNS				
Moon Hee-sung	Men's halfpipe	35.00	DNI	—N/a	35.00	22	Did not advance				
Kim Da-eun	Women's halfpipe	23.25	41.50	—N/a	41.50	20	Did not advance				
Lee So-young	Women's halfpipe	26.75	29.25	—N/a	29.25	21	Did not advance				

== Luge ==
Athlete	Event	Run 1		Run 2		Run 3		Run 4		Total	
Athlete	Event	Time	Rank	Time	Rank	Time	Rank	Time	Rank	Time	Rank
Jung Hye-sun	Women's singles	55.118	25	54.469	23	54.194	21	Did not advance		2:43.781	24

== Short-track speed skating ==
South Korea qualified the maximum team size of ten short-track speed skaters (five per gender) after the conclusion of the 2025–26 ISU Short Track World Tour.

Men

Athlete	Event	Heat		Quarterfinal		Semifinal		Final	
Athlete	Event	Time	Rank	Time	Rank	Time	Rank	Time	Rank
Hwang Dae-heon	500 m	41.191	3	Did not advance					
Rim Jong-un	500 m	41.829	3	Did not advance					
Hwang Dae-heon	1000 m	1:24.133	2 Q	PEN		Did not advance			
Rim Jong-un	1000 m	1:25.558	2 Q	1:25.213	2 Q	1:24.025	1 QA	1:24.611	3rd place, bronze medalist(s)
Shin Dong-min	1000 m	1:24.870	2 Q	1:23.971	2 Q	1:24.327	5 QB	1:27.453	8
Hwang Dae-heon	1500 m	—N/a		2:23.283	1 Q	2:15.823	2 QA	2:12.304	2nd place, silver medalist(s)
Rim Jong-un	1500 m	—N/a		2:38.452	6	Did not advance			
Shin Dong-min	1500 m	—N/a		2:17.365	3 Q	2:17.192	2 QA	2:12.556	4
Hwang Dae-heon; Lee Jeong-min; Lee June-seo; Rim Jong-un; Shin Dong-min	5000 m relay	—N/a				6:52.708	1 QA	6:52.239	2nd place, silver medalist(s)

Qualification legend: Q – Qualify based on position in heat; q – Qualify based on time in field; QA – Qualify to medal final; QB – Qualify to consolation final
* – Athlete skated in a preliminary round but not the final.

Women

Athlete	Event	Heat		Quarterfinal		Semifinal		Final	
Athlete	Event	Time	Rank	Time	Rank	Time	Rank	Time	Rank
Choi Min-jeong	500 m	43.204	2 Q	41.955	1 Q	43.060	5 QB	43.473	7
Kim Gil-li	500 m	43.301	2 Q	43.373	3	Did not advance			
Lee So-yeon	500 m	43.406	3 q	43.330	5	Did not advance			
Choi Min-jeong	1000 m	1:26.925	1 Q	1:28.752	2 Q	1:28.407	4 QB	1:31.208	8
Kim Gil-li	1000 m	1:29.656	1 Q	1:29.068	2 Q	2:01.422	4 ADV A	1:28.614	3rd place, bronze medalist(s)
Noh Do-hee	1000 m	1:30.097	2 Q	1:32.174	5	Did not advance			
Choi Min-jeong	1500 m	—N/a		2:29.010	2 Q	2:20.984	1 QA	2:32.450	2nd place, silver medalist(s)
Kim Gil-li	1500 m	—N/a		2:32.080	1 Q	2:29.385	1 QA	2:32.076	1st place, gold medalist(s)
Noh Do-hee	1500 m	—N/a		2:25.152	3 Q	3:54.35	7	Did not advance	
Choi Min-jeong; Kim Gil-li; Lee So-yeon; Noh Do-hee; Shim Suk-hee	3000 m relay	—N/a				4:04.729	1 QA	4:04.014	1st place, gold medalist(s)

Qualification legend: Q – Qualify based on position in heat; q – Qualify based on time in field; QA – Qualify to medal final; QB – Qualify to consolation final; ADV A – Advanced to medal final on referee decision

Mixed

Athlete	Event	Quarterfinal		Semifinal		Final	
Athlete	Event	Time	Rank	Time	Rank	Time	Rank
Choi Min-jeong; Hwang Dae-heon; Kim Gil-li; Noh Do-hee; Rim Jong-un; Shin Dong-min	2000 m relay	2.39.337	1 Q	2.46.554	3 QB	2.40.317	6

Qualification legend: Q – Qualify based on position in heat; q – Qualify based on time in field; QA – Qualify to medal final; QB – Qualify to consolation final
* – Athlete skated in a preliminary round but not the final.

== Skeleton ==
Athlete	Event	Run 1		Run 2		Run 3		Run 4		Total	
Athlete	Event	Time	Rank	Time	Rank	Time	Rank	Time	Rank	Time	Rank
Jung Seung-gi	Men's	56.57	9	56.65	10	56.19	8	56.49	11	3:45.90	10
Kim Ji-soo	Men's	57.15	15	57.00	15	57.03	17	56.93	17	3:48.11	16
Hong Su-jung	Women's	58.88	22	58.45	21	58.73	20	58.67	22	3:54.73	22
Hong Su-jung; Jung Seung-gi	Mixed team	1:01.84	13	59.61	11	—N/a				2:01.45	11

== Snowboarding ==
Alpine

Athlete	Event	Qualification		Round of 16	Quarterfinal	Semifinal	Final	
Athlete	Event	Time	Rank	Opposition Time	Opposition Time	Opposition Time	Opposition Time	Rank
Cho Wan-hee	Men's parallel giant slalom	1:27.76	18	Did not advance				
Kim Sang-kyum	Men's parallel giant slalom	1:27.18	8 Q	Kosir (SLO); W DNF	Fischnaller (ITA); W DNF	Zamfirov (BUL); W −0.23	Karl (AUT); L +0.19	2nd place, silver medalist(s)
Lee Sang-ho	Men's parallel giant slalom	1:26.74	6 Q	Prommegger (AUT); L +0.17	Did not advance			
Jeong Hae-rim	Women's parallel giant slalom	1:40.55	31	Did not advance				

Cross

Athlete	Event	Seeding		1/8 final	Quarterfinal	Semifinal	Final	
Athlete	Event	Time	Rank	Position	Position	Position	Position	Rank
Woo Su-been	Women's snowboard cross	1:18.90	29	DNF	Did not advance			

Park & Pipe

Athlete	Event	Qualification					Final				
Athlete	Event	Run 1	Run 2	Run 3	Best	Rank	Run 1	Run 2	Run 3	Best	Rank
Kim Geon-hui	Men's halfpipe	8.00	8.50	—N/a	8.50	23	Did not advance				
Lee Chae-un	Men's halfpipe	82.00	DNI	—N/a	82.00	9 Q	24.75	24.75	87.50	87.50	6
Lee Ji-o	Men's halfpipe	17.75	74.00	—N/a	74.00	13	Did not advance				
Choi Ga-on	Women's halfpipe	82.25	DNI	—N/a	82.25	6 Q	10.00	DNI	90.25	90.25	1st place, gold medalist(s)
Lee Na-yoon	Women's halfpipe	35.00	DNS	—N/a	35.00	22	Did not advance				
Yu Seung-eun	Women's big air	80.75	77.75	88.75	166.50	4 Q	87.75	83.25	20.75	171.0	3rd place, bronze medalist(s)
Yu Seung-eun	Women's slopestyle	76.80	18.60	—N/a	76.80	3 Q	20.70	34.18	15.46	34.18	12

== Speed skating ==
South Korea qualified eight speed skaters (four men and four women) through performances at the 2025-26 ISU Speed Skating World Cup.

Men

Athlete	Event	Race	
Athlete	Event	Time	Rank
Kim Jun-ho	500 m	34.68	12
Koo Kyung-min	500 m	34.80	15
Koo Kyung-min	1000 m	1:08.53	10
Chung Jae-won	1500 m	1:45.80	14

Women

Athlete	Event	Race	
Athlete	Event	Time	Rank
Kim Min-sun	500 m	38.010	14
Lee Na-hyun	500 m	37.86	10
Kim Min-sun	1000 m	1:16.24	18
Lee Na-hyun	1000 m	1:15.76	9
Lim Lee-won	1500 m	1:59.73	28
Park Ji-woo	1500 m	1:58.26	21

Mass start

Athlete	Event	Semifinal			Final		
Athlete	Event	Points	Time	Rank	Points	Time	Rank
Cho Seung-min	Men's	0	7:56.44	13	Did not advance		
Chung Jae-won	Men's	21	7:42.81	3 Q	6	8:04.60	5
Lim Lee-won	Women's	0	8:39.27	10	Did not advance		
Park Ji-woo	Women's	20	8:44.22	3 Q	0	8:36.31	14

== Disqualifications ==
Women's cross country skiers Han Dasom and Lee Eui-jin were disqualified from the Women's 50 kilometre classical race for allegedly using fluorinated wax, which is banned, on their skies. South Korea denied the allegations.

== See also ==
- South Korea at the 2026 Winter Paralympics
