= Sighel =

Sighel is a surname. Notable people with the surname include:

- Arianna Sighel (born 1996), Italian short-track speed skater
- Pietro Sighel (born 1999), Italian short track speed skater
- Roberto Sighel (born 1967), Italian speed skater
- Emiliano Sighel (born 2009), Italian ice hockey player for Alps Ice Academy
