= Eva Grenouilloux =

French speed skater (born 2004)

Personal information
- Born: 9 July 2004 (age 21) Nogent-sur-Marne, France
- Height: 153 cm (5 ft 0 in)

Sport
- Country: France
- Sport: Short-track speed skating
- Club: Reims Patinage de Vitesse
Medal record
Women's short-track speed skating
Representing France
Winter World University Games
Bronze medal – third place	2025 Turin	3000 m relay

Eva Grenouilloux (born 9 July 2004) is a French short-track speed skater who competed at the 2026 Winter Olympics.

== Career ==
In January 2025, she competed at the 2025 Winter World University Games and won a bronze medal in the 3000 metre relay, along with Bérénice Comby, Aurélie Lévêque and Cloé Ollivier.

In January 2026 she was selected to represent France at the 2026 Winter Olympics.
