= Danaé Blais =

Canadian speed skater (born 1999)

Personal information
- Born: May 10, 1999 (age 27) Châteauguay, Quebec, Canada
- Height: 1.67 m (5 ft 6 in)

Sport
- Country: Canada
- Sport: Short track speed skating
Medal record
Women's short track speed skating
Representing Canada
Olympic Games
Bronze medal – third place	2026 Milano Cortina	3000 m relay
World Championships
Gold medal – first place	2025 Beijing	2000 m mixed relay
Silver medal – second place	2022 Montreal	3000 m relay
Silver medal – second place	2026 Montreal	2000 m mixed relay
Bronze medal – third place	2024 Rotterdam	3000 m relay
World Junior Championships
Gold medal – first place	2018 Tomaszów Mazowiecki	3000 m relay

Danaé Blais (born May 10, 1999) is a Canadian short-track speed skater. She represented Canada at the 2026 Winter Olympics, where she won a bronze medal in the 3000 m relay.

== Career ==
=== Junior ===
At the 2018 World Junior Short Track Speed Skating Championships, Blais won gold as part of the Canadian 3000 m relay team.

=== Senior ===
On January 18, 2022, Blais was named to Canada's 2022 Olympic team. On December 17, 2025, Blais was named to Canada's 2026 Olympic team.
