= 2025 European Short Track Speed Skating Championships =

2025 ISU European Short Track Speed Skating Championships
- Venue: Joynext Arena
- Location: Dresden, Germany
- Dates: 17–19 January
- Competitors: 120 from 25 nations

The 2025 European Short Track Speed Skating Championships took place from 17 to 19 January 2025 in the Joynext Arena in Dresden.

== Schedule ==
The Championships had nine events: three individual events for men and women and three team events.

		Fri 17	Sat 18	Sun 19
Men	500 m	H	R, QF, SF, F	
Men	1000 m	H		R, QF, SF, F
Men	1500 m	QF	R, SF, F	
Men	5000 m relay	QF	SF	F
Women	500 m	H		R, QF, SF, F
Women	1000 m	H	R, QF, SF, F	
Women	1500 m	QF		R, SF, F
Women	3000 m relay		SF, F	
Mixed	2000 m relay	QF	SF	F

== Participating nations ==
The final entry list totalled 120 athletes from 25 countries.

- Austria (4)
- Belgium (5)
- Bosnia and Herzegovina (1)
- Bulgaria (4)
- Croatia (4)
- Czech Republic (5)
- France (8)
- Germany (9)
- Great Britain (5)
- Hungary (10)
- Ireland (1)
- Italy (10)
- Latvia (5)
- Lithuania (1)
- Netherlands (10)
- Norway (4)
- Poland (10)
- Romania (1)
- Serbia (1)
- Slovakia (2)
- Slovenia (1)
- Sweden (1)
- Switzerland (3)
- Turkey (5)
- Ukraine (10)

== Medal summary ==
=== Medal table ===
Rank	Nation	Gold	Silver	Bronze	Total
1	Italy	4	3	4	11
2	Netherlands	3	3	0	6
3	Hungary	1	2	0	3
4	France	1	0	1	2
5	Poland	0	1	2	3
6	Belgium	0	1	1	2
Totals (6 entries)		9	10	8	27

=== Men ===
Event	Gold		Silver		Bronze	
500 metres	Jens van 't Wout; Netherlands	40.642	Pietro Sighel; Italy	41.245	Quentin Fercoq; France	41.310
1000 metres	Pietro Sighel; Italy	1:23.788	Jens van 't Wout; Netherlands	1:23.797	Luca Spechenhauser; Italy	1:24.121
1500 metres	Jens van 't Wout; Netherlands	2:14.434	Stijn Desmet; Belgium Sven Roes; Netherlands	2:14.492	Not awarded	
5000 metre relay	Italy; Thomas Nadalini; Lorenzo Previtali; Pietro Sighel; Luca Spechenhauser; Mattia Antonioli	6:47.181	Poland; Łukasz Kuczyński; Michał Niewiński; Diané Sellier; Neithan Thomas; Paweł Adamski	6:47.353	Belgium; Stijn Desmet; Warre Noiron; Ward Pétré; Warre Van Damme	6:48.712

=== Women ===
Event	Gold		Silver		Bronze	
500 metres	Petra Jászapáti; Hungary	43.087	Arianna Sighel; Italy	43.236	Chiara Betti; Italy	43.345
1000 metres	Arianna Fontana; Italy	1:32.567	Petra Jászapáti; Hungary	1:32.887	Elisa Confortola; Italy	1:42.652
1500 metres	Xandra Velzeboer; Netherlands	2:38.364	Gloria Ioriatti; Italy	2:38.451	Elisa Confortola; Italy	2:38.529
3000 metre relay	Italy; Chiara Betti; Elisa Confortola; Arianna Fontana; Gloria Ioriatti; Arianna Sighel	4:11.703	Hungary; Sára Bácskai; Petra Jászapáti; Zsófia Kónya; Maja Somodi; Rebeka Sziliczei-Német	4:12.324	Poland; Natalia Maliszewska; Nikola Mazur; Kamila Stormowska; Gabriela Topolska	4:17.021

=== Mixed ===
Event	Gold		Silver		Bronze	
2000 metre relay	France; Étienne Bastier; Quentin Fercoq; Aurélie Lévêque; Cloé Ollivier; Gwendoline Daudet; Tawan Thomas	2:40.460	Netherlands; Teun Boer; Zoë Deltrap; Jens van 't Wout; Michelle Velzeboer; Sjinkie Knegt; Diede van Oorschot	2:48.607	Poland; Natalia Maliszewska; Michał Niewiński; Diané Sellier; Kamila Stormowska; Łukasz Kuczyński; Nikola Mazur	2:54.651
