= Short-track speed skating at the 2025 Winter World University Games =

Short-track speed skating at the Torino 2025 FISU World University Games
- Short track speed skating pictogram
- Venue: Torino Palavela
- Dates: 21–23 January 2025

Short-track speed skating at the 2025 Winter World University Games was held at the Torino Palavela from 21 to 23 January 2025.

== Men's events ==
Event	Gold		Silver		Bronze	
500 metres	Kim Tae-sung; South Korea	40.865	Shogo Miyata; Japan	41.120	Lee Dong-hyun; South Korea	41.208
1000 metres	Kim Tae-sung; South Korea	1:29.377	Bae Seo-chan; South Korea	1:29.699	Lee Dong-hyun; South Korea	1:29.726
1500 metres	Kim Tae-sung; South Korea	2:27.775	Lee Dong-hyun; South Korea	2:27.948	Bae Seo-chan; South Korea	2:28.087
5000 metre relay	China; Li Kun; Liu Guanyi; Song Guixu; Zhang Tianyi; Zhu Yiding	6:57.044	Japan; Mikihiro Inoue; Shogo Miyata; Daito Ochi; Kei Shimmura	6:57.327	Kazakhstan; Valeriy Klimenko; Dinmukhamedaldiyar Tazhibay; Aibek Temirkhan; Sanzhar Zhanissov; Alisher Abulkatimov	7:03.776

== Women's events ==
Event	Gold		Silver		Bronze	
500 metres	Kim Gil-li; South Korea	44.717	Hao Weiying; China	44.825	Seo Whi-min; South Korea	44.925
1000 metres	Kim Gil-li; South Korea	1:31.559	Seo Whi-min; South Korea	1:31.709	Hao Weiying; China	1:31.819
1500 metres	Kim Gil-li; South Korea	2:37.614	Seo Whi-min; South Korea	2:37.985	Kim Geon-hee; South Korea	2:38.302
3000 metre relay	South Korea; Kim Geon-hee; Kim Gil-li; Lee Ji-a; Seo Whi-min; Kim Eun-seo	4:15.323	China; Hao Weiying; Song Yifei; Xing Ailin; Zhang Yan; Lyu Wanyu	4:16.389	France; Bérénice Comby; Eva Grenouilloux; Aurélie Lévêque; Cloé Ollivier	4:19.184

== Mixed events ==
Event	Gold		Silver		Bronze	
2000 metre relay	South Korea; Kim Geon-hee; Kim Gil-li; Kim Tae-sung; Lee Dong-hyun; Bae Seo-chan; Seo Whi-min	2:44.042	China; Hao Weiying; Li Kun; Liu Guanyi; Zhang Yan; Lyu Wanyu; Song Guixu	2:44.631	Kazakhstan; Alina Azhgaliyeva; Valeriy Klimenko; Dinmukhamedaldiyar Tazhibay; Malika Yermek; Yana Khan	2:44.815

== Medal table ==
Rank	Nation	Gold	Silver	Bronze	Total
1	South Korea	8	4	5	17
2	China	1	3	1	5
3	Japan	0	2	0	2
4	Kazakhstan	0	0	2	2
5	France	0	0	1	1
Totals (5 entries)		9	9	9	27
