= Alena Krylova =

Russian speed skater (born 2002)

Personal information
- Native name: Алёна Анато́льевна Крыло́ва
- Born: 11 October 2002 (age 23) Novouralsk, Russia

Sport
- Country: Russia
- Sport: Short track speed skating
- Event(s): 500 m, 1000 m

Alena Krylova (Russian: Алёна Анато́льевна Крыло́ва, born 11 October 2002) is a Russian short track speed-skater. She represented Individual Neutral Athletes at the 2026 Winter Olympics.

== Career ==
Krylova is the 2024 and 2025 Russian Champion in the all-around. During the 2025 Russian Champion she won the 500 metres and 1000 metres.

In October 2025, she was selected to represent Individual Neutral Athletes at the 2026 Winter Olympics. She competed in the 500 metres, and was eliminated in the heats. She then competed in the 1000 metres and advanced to the finals.
