= Arianna Fontana =

Italian speed skater (born 1990)

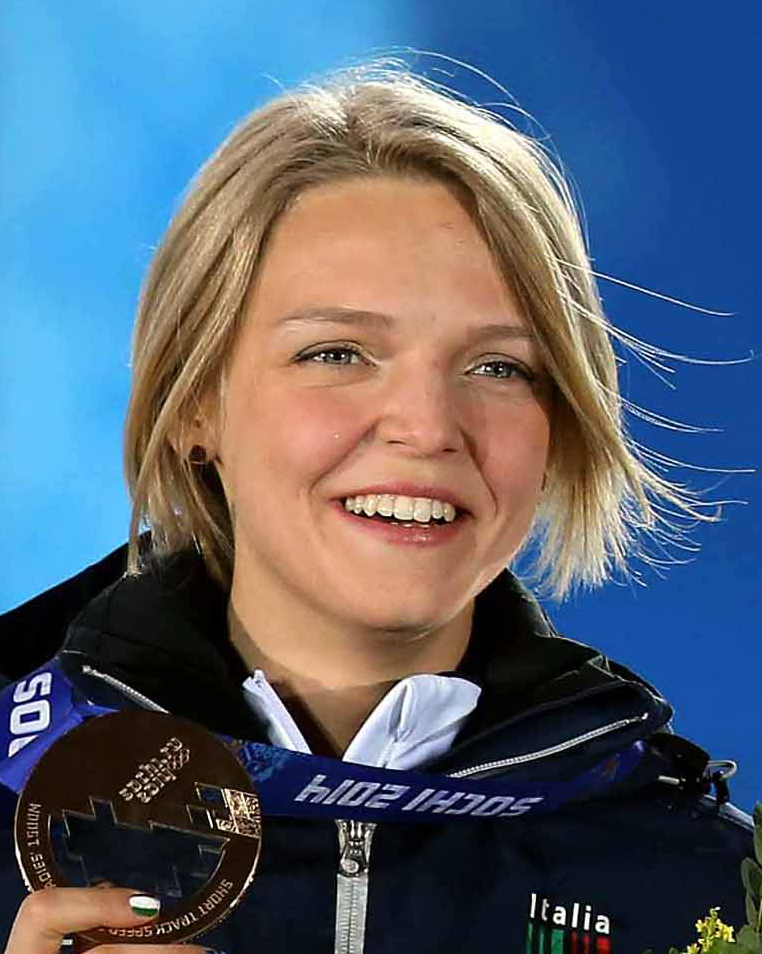
- Fontana in Sochi 2014

Personal information
- Born: 14 April 1990 (age 36) Sondrio, Italy
- Height: 1.64 m (5 ft 5 in)
- Weight: 63 kg (139 lb)

Sport
- Country: Italy
- Sport: Short track speed skating

Achievements and titles
- Personal bests: 500 m: 41.521 (2026); 1000 m: 1:26.811 (2022); 1500 m: 2:15.753 (2016); 3000 m: 5:01.187
Medal record
Women's short track speed skating
Representing Italy
Event	1st	2nd	3rd
Olympic Games	3	6	5
World Championships	1	6	10
World Team Championships	0	0	1
European Championships	25	14	6
Total	29	26	22
Olympic Games
Gold medal – first place	2018 Pyeongchang	500 m
Gold medal – first place	2022 Beijing	500 m
Gold medal – first place	2026 Milano Cortina	2000 m mixed relay
Silver medal – second place	2014 Sochi	500 m
Silver medal – second place	2018 Pyeongchang	3000 m relay
Silver medal – second place	2022 Beijing	1500 m
Silver medal – second place	2022 Beijing	2000 m mixed relay
Silver medal – second place	2026 Milano Cortina	500 m
Silver medal – second place	2026 Milano Cortina	3000 m relay
Bronze medal – third place	2006 Turin	3000 m relay
Bronze medal – third place	2010 Vancouver	500 m
Bronze medal – third place	2014 Sochi	1500 m
Bronze medal – third place	2014 Sochi	3000 m relay
Bronze medal – third place	2018 Pyeongchang	1000 m
World Championships
Gold medal – first place	2015 Moscow	1500 m
Silver medal – second place	2007 Milan	500 m
Silver medal – second place	2011 Sheffield	500 m
Silver medal – second place	2011 Sheffield	1000 m
Silver medal – second place	2012 Shanghai	500 m
Silver medal – second place	2015 Moscow	Overall
Silver medal – second place	2021 Dordrecht	500m
Bronze medal – third place	2006 Minneapolis	3000 m relay
Bronze medal – third place	2011 Sheffield	Overall
Bronze medal – third place	2012 Shanghai	Overall
Bronze medal – third place	2014 Montreal	3000 m relay
Bronze medal – third place	2015 Moscow	500 m
Bronze medal – third place	2015 Moscow	1000 m
Bronze medal – third place	2015 Moscow	3000 m relay
Bronze medal – third place	2021 Dordrecht	Overall
Bronze medal – third place	2021 Dordrecht	3000 m relay
Bronze medal – third place	2024 Rotterdam	1000 m
European Championships
Gold medal – first place	2006 Krynica-Zdrój	3000 m relay
Gold medal – first place	2008 Ventspils	1500 m
Gold medal – first place	2008 Ventspils	Overall
Gold medal – first place	2009 Turin	500 m
Gold medal – first place	2009 Turin	1000 m
Gold medal – first place	2009 Turin	Overall
Gold medal – first place	2010 Dresden	500 m
Gold medal – first place	2010 Dresden	1500 m
Gold medal – first place	2011 Heerenveen	1000 m
Gold medal – first place	2011 Heerenveen	1500 m
Gold medal – first place	2011 Heerenveen	Overall
Gold medal – first place	2012 Mlada Boleslav	500 m
Gold medal – first place	2012 Mlada Boleslav	1500 m
Gold medal – first place	2012 Mlada Boleslav	Overall
Gold medal – first place	2013 Malmö	500 m
Gold medal – first place	2013 Malmö	Overall
Gold medal – first place	2014 Dresden	500 m
Gold medal – first place	2017 Turin	1500 m
Gold medal – first place	2017 Turin	Overall
Gold medal – first place	2017 Turin	3000 m relay
Gold medal – first place	2018 Dresden	1000 m
Gold medal – first place	2018 Dresden	Overall
Gold medal – first place	2025 Dresden	1000 m
Gold medal – first place	2025 Dresden	3000 m relay
Gold medal – first place	2026 Tilburg	1500 m
Silver medal – second place	2006 Krynica-Zdrój	1000 m
Silver medal – second place	2006 Krynica-Zdrój	Overall
Silver medal – second place	2007 Sheffield	3000 m relay
Silver medal – second place	2008 Ventspils	1000 m
Silver medal – second place	2010 Dresden	Overall
Silver medal – second place	2012 Mlada Boleslav	3000 m relay
Silver medal – second place	2013 Malmö	1000 m
Silver medal – second place	2013 Malmö	1500 m
Silver medal – second place	2015 Dordrecht	1000 m
Silver medal – second place	2018 Dresden	500 m
Silver medal – second place	2020 Debrecen	1500 m
Silver medal – second place	2020 Debrecen	Overall
Silver medal – second place	2020 Debrecen	3000 m relay
Silver medal – second place	2026 Tilburg	3000 m relay
Bronze medal – third place	2006 Krynica-Zdrój	1500 m
Bronze medal – third place	2007 Sheffield	1500 m
Bronze medal – third place	2009 Turin	1500 m
Bronze medal – third place	2011 Heerenveen	3000 m relay
Bronze medal – third place	2014 Dresden	Overall
Bronze medal – third place	2020 Debrecen	1000 m
World Junior Championships
Gold medal – first place	2009 Sherbrooke	3000 m relay
Silver medal – second place	2008 Bolzano	2000 m relay
Silver medal – second place	2009 Sherbrooke	500 m
Bronze medal – third place	2008 Bolzano	1500 m

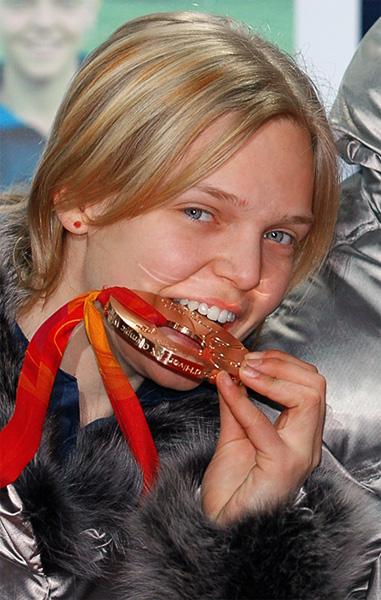
Arianna Fontana, the most decorated Italian Olympian Athlete, with fourteen medals in short track.

Arianna Fontana OMRI (born 14 April 1990) is an Italian short track speed skater and the first woman to win Olympic medals in six straight Winter Olympics. Specializing in the 500 m event, among her fourteen Olympic medals are two gold medals in the 500 m short track, one at the 2018 Winter Olympics in Pyeongchang and the second one at the 2022 Winter Olympics in Beijing, as well as a gold medal at the 2026 Winter Olympics 2000 m mixed relay in her home country of Italy. She is the short track skater with the most Olympic medals, and the Italian athlete, including both men and women, with the highest number of medals 14, in both the Summer and Winter Olympic Games, and the Italian sportswoman with the highest number of Winter Olympic medals, three more than Stefania Belmondo.

== Career ==
Fontana started skating at the age of four, following in the footsteps of her brother Alessandro, initially on roller skates before switching to ice skating. She first trained in Lanzada until the rink there closed, when she switched her training base to Bormio.

Fontana made her international championship debut at the 2006 European Short Track Speed Skating Championships in Krynica-Zdrój, where she took the overall silver medal. At the 2006 Winter Olympics in Turin, she won bronze in the 3000 m relay. She placed 11th in the 500m and 6th in the 1000 m. The relay medal was the first for Italy in short track speed skating: at 15 years of age, Fontana became the youngest Italian to win a Winter Olympic medal. Following the 2006 Games, Fontana and her relay team-mates were appointed Knights of the Order of Merit of the Italian Republic.

At the 2010 Winter Olympics in Vancouver, she won a bronze medal in the 500-metre event, was eliminated in the semi-finals of the 1500 metre event, and was eliminated in the quarterfinals of the 1000 metre event. Her 500m bronze made her the first Italian to take an individual Olympic medal in short track.

Fontana began dating Italian-American skater Anthony Lobello Jr. in 2012: the couple were engaged the following year and married in May 2014 in Colico. The couple split their time between homes in Valtellina, Courmayeur and Tallahassee, Florida.

At the 2014 Winter Olympics in Sochi, she was upgraded from a bronze to a silver medal in the 500 m event after colliding with British skater Elise Christie. Christie was disqualified after causing a crash in the final. She won a bronze medal in the 1500 m event and the Team-event and was disqualified in the 1000 m event. Following the Games, Lobello began coaching Fontana following his retirement from competition. The following year Fontana took her first title at the World Short Track Speed Skating Championships, winning the gold in the 1500m and taking the overall silver.

In October 2017, Fontana was named as Italy's flag bearer for the opening ceremony of the 2018 Winter Olympics in Pyeongchang, South Korea. She was the first short track skater to be selected as flag bearer for the Italian Olympic team and the second flag bearer from the Italian Ice Sports Federation, after Carolina Kostner. She won her first Olympic gold medal there, in the 500 m event. She was the first European to win a 500 m Olympic gold. She also won silver in the team event and bronze in the 1000 m event, becoming the woman with the most medals in the sport. It also meant that she had won Olympic medals at every contested distance.

At the 2022 Winter Olympics, she won three more medals: a silver in the 2000 m mixed relay event, a silver in the 1500 m event, and a gold in the 500 m event, bringing her total medal count to 11 Olympic medals. This made her the Italian sportswoman with the highest number of Winter Olympic medals and elevated her to the rank of second-most decorated Italian athlete in Olympic history, behind Edoardo Mangiarotti.

At the 2026 Winter Olympics, she won three more medals: a gold in the 2000 metre mixed relay event, and silvers in the 500 metres and 3000 metre relay events. She became Italy's most decorated Olympian with 14 medals, surpassing the previous record of 13 set by Mangiarotti.

== Olympic results ==
Edition	500m	1000m	1500m	3000m relay	2000m mixed relay
2006 Winter Olympics Turin	11	6		3rd place, bronze medalist(s)	N/A
2010 Winter Olympics Vancouver	3rd place, bronze medalist(s)	14	9	6	N/A
2014 Winter Olympics Sochi	2nd place, silver medalist(s)	PEN	3rd place, bronze medalist(s)	3rd place, bronze medalist(s)	N/A
2018 Winter Olympics Pyeongchang	1st place, gold medalist(s)	3rd place, bronze medalist(s)	7	2nd place, silver medalist(s)	N/A
2022 Winter Olympics Beijing	1st place, gold medalist(s)	PEN	2nd place, silver medalist(s)	5	2nd place, silver medalist(s)
2026 Winter Olympics Milano Cortina	2nd place, silver medalist(s)	4	5	2nd place, silver medalist(s)	1st place, gold medalist(s)
Best results	1st place, gold medalist(s)	3rd place, bronze medalist(s)	2nd place, silver medalist(s)	2nd place, silver medalist(s)	1st place, gold medalist(s)

== See also ==
- List of multiple Olympic medalists
- List of multiple Winter Olympic medallists
- Italian sportswomen multiple medalists at Olympics and World Championships

Olympic Games
Preceded by Armin Zöggeler	Flagbearer for Italy; Pyeongchang 2018	Succeeded by Michela Moioli
