= Étienne Bastier =

French speed skater (born 2004)

Personal information
- Born: 16 February 2004 (age 22) Amiens, France
- Height: 1.77 m (5 ft 10 in)

Sport
- Country: France
- Sport: Short track speed skating
- Club: USO Patinage de Vitesse
Medal record
Men's short-track speed skating
Representing France
European Championships
Gold medal – first place	2025 Dresden	2000 m mixed relay

Étienne Bastier (French pronunciation: [etjɛn bastje]; born 16 February 2004) is a French short-track speed skater who competed at the 2026 Winter Olympics.

== Career ==
In January 2023, he competed at the 2023 World Junior Short Track Speed Skating Championships, finishing third in the Men's 1500 metre heat 3 with a time of 2:25.200, advancing to the quarterfinals.

In January 2025, he competed at the 2025 European Short Track Speed Skating Championships and won a gold medal in the 2000 metre mixed relay.

In January 2026, he was selected to represent France at the 2026 Winter Olympics. He competed in the 2000 metre mixed relay and advanced to the B Final, finishing in seventh place.
