= Lee So-yeon (short-track speed skater) =

South Korean speed skater (born 1993)

Personal information
- Born: 16 April 1993 (age 33) Suwon, South Korea

Sport
- Country: South Korea
- Sport: Short-track speed skating
Medal record
Olympic Games
Gold medal – first place	2026 Milano Cortina	3000 m relay

Lee So-yeon (Korean: 이소연; born 16 April 1993 in Suwon) is a South Korean short track speed skater. Lee won a gold medal at the 2026 Winter Olympics in the women's 3000m relay. She also won a bronze medal in a 1000 m event at the 2012–13 ISU Short Track Speed Skating World Cup.
