= Kim Gil-li =

South Korean speed skater (born 2004)

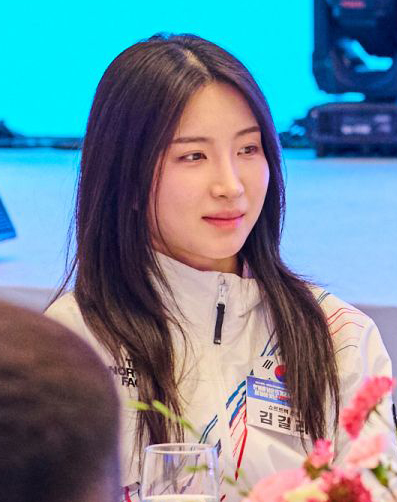
- Kim in 2026

Personal information
- Nationality: South Korean
- Born: 1 July 2004 (age 22) Seoul, South Korea
- Education: Korea University

Korean name
- Hangul: 김길리
- RR: Gim Gilri
- MR: Kim Killi

Sport
- Country: South Korea
- Sport: Short track speed skating
- Club: Seongnam City Hall
Medal record
Representing South Korea
Women's short-track speed skating
Olympic Games
Gold medal – first place	2026 Milano Cortina	1500 m
Gold medal – first place	2026 Milano Cortina	3000 m relay
Bronze medal – third place	2026 Milano Cortina	1000 m
World Championships
Gold medal – first place	2024 Rotterdam	1500 m
Gold medal – first place	2026 Montreal	1000 m
Gold medal – first place	2026 Montreal	1500 m
Silver medal – second place	2023 Seoul	3000 m relay
Silver medal – second place	2024 Rotterdam	1000 m
Bronze medal – third place	2025 Beijing	1500 m
Asian Winter Games
Gold medal – first place	2025 Harbin	1500 m
Gold medal – first place	2025 Harbin	2000 m mixed relay
Silver medal – second place	2025 Harbin	500 m
Silver medal – second place	2025 Harbin	1000 m
Bronze medal – third place	2025 Beijing	1500 m relay
World Junior Championships
Gold medal – first place	2020 Bormio	1000 m
Gold medal – first place	2022 Gdańsk	1500 m
Gold medal – first place	2023 Dresden	1000 m
Gold medal – first place	2023 Dresden	1500 m
Gold medal – first place	2023 Dresden	3000 m relay
Silver medal – second place	2022 Gdańsk	1000 m
Winter World University Games
Gold medal – first place	2025 Turin	500 m
Gold medal – first place	2025 Turin	1000 m
Gold medal – first place	2025 Turin	1500 m
Gold medal – first place	2025 Turin	3000 m relay
Gold medal – first place	2025 Turin	2000 m mixed relay

Kim Gil-li (Korean: 김길리; born 1 July 2004) is a South Korean short track speed skater and double Olympic champion. At the 2026 Winter Olympics, she won gold medals in both the 1500 metres and the 3000 metre relay, as well as a bronze medal in the 1000 metres.

She followed up her performance with victories at both the 1000m and 1500m events of the 2026 World Championships. These victories followed a period of sustained success for Kim, who won the 1500m title at both the 2024 World Championships and the 2025 Asian Winter Games. Additionally, she was awarded the Crystal Globe as the best overall skater of the 2023–24 World Cup season.
