= Arianna Sighel =

Italian speed skater (born 1996)

Personal information
- Born: 2 September 1996 (age 30) Trento, Italy

Sport
- Country: Italy
- Sport: Short track speed skating
- Club: Gruppo Sportivo Fiamme Oro
Medal record
Women's short track speed skating
Representing Italy
Olympic Games
Silver medal – second place	2026 Milano Cortina	3000 m relay
World Championships
Gold medal – first place	2026 Montreal	2000 m mixed relay
Silver medal – second place	2024 Rotterdam	3000 m relay
Silver medal – second place	2026 Montreal	3000 m relay
Bronze medal – third place	2021 Dordrecht	3000 m relay
Bronze medal – third place	2023 Seoul	2000 m mixed relay
European Championships
Gold medal – first place	2025 Dresden	3000 m relay
Silver medal – second place	2020 Debrecen	3000 m relay
Silver medal – second place	2024 Gdansk	3000 m relay
Silver medal – second place	2025 Dresden	500 m
Silver medal – second place	2026 Tilburg	3000 m relay
Bronze medal – third place	2021 Gdansk	3000 m relay
Bronze medal – third place	2023 Gdansk	3000 m relay
Bronze medal – third place	2023 Gdansk	2000 m mixed relay
Bronze medal – third place	2026 Tilburg	1500 m

Arianna Sighel (born 2 September 1996) is an Italian short-track speed skater. Sighel was member of the Italian relay teams at the 2021, 2023 and 2024 World Championships, winning two bronze and one silver medal. She represented Italy at the European Championships between 2020 and 2026, winning several individual and team medals. At the 2026 Winter Olympics, Sighel won a silver medal in the 3000 m relay.

== Career ==
Arianna Sighel is a daughter of Roberto Sighel, who is also her coach, and the older sister of Pietro Sighel.

She made her international debut at the 2012 Winter Youth Olympics. At the international senior level, her first podium was a second place at the 2020 European Championships with the Italian women's relay team. Sighel was part of that relay team that won the gold medal at the 2025 European Championships.

At the World Championships, Sighel was part of the Italian women's relay team that won a bronze medal in 2021 and a silver medal in 2024. She also was part of the mixed relay team that obtained the bronze medal in 2023.

Sighel represented Italy at the 2022 Winter Olympics and she is part of the Italian team at the 2026 Winter Olympics.
