= Gabriela Topolska =

Polish speed skater (born 2001)

Personal information
- Born: 15 March 2001 (age 25) Białystok, Poland

Sport
- Country: Poland
- Sport: Short-track speed skating
Medal record
Women's short-track speed skating
Representing Poland
World Championships
Silver medal – second place	2025 Beijing	3000 m relay
European Championships
Silver medal – second place	2024 Gdańsk	2000 m mixed relay
Silver medal – second place	2026 Tilburg	2000 m mixed relay
Bronze medal – third place	2025 Dresden	3000 m relay

Gabriela Topolska (born 15 March 2001) is a Polish short-track speed skater.

== Career ==
In 2022, Topolska won two bronze medals in the mixed relay at the World Cup with Michał Niewiński, Diané Sellier, Nikola Mazur, Natalia Maliszewska and Kamila Stormowska.

On 14 January 2024, Topolska, together with Mazur, Sellier, Niewiński and Stormowska, won a silver medal in the 2000m at the European Short Track Speed Skating Championships, though she did not compete in the final.

At the 2025 World Championships, she won the silver medal in the women's relay with Maliszewska, Mazur and Stormowska. In the same year, she finished third in the women's relay at the European Championships with the same teammates.

During the 2025–26 ISU Short Track World Tour, Topolska made her first A final in the 1500 meters, finishing as the top Polish skater ahead of Kamila Sellier. In January 2026, she competed at the 2026 European Short Track Speed Skating Championships and won a silver medal in the 2000 metre mixed relay. She was subsequently selected to represent Poland at the 2026 Winter Olympics.
