= Chiara Betti =

Italian speed skater (born 2002)

Personal information
- Born: 12 March 2002 (age 24) Trento, Italy

Sport
- Country: Italy
- Sport: Short-track speed skating
- Club: GS Fiamme Gialle
Medal record
Women's short-track speed skating
Representing Italy
Olympic Games
Gold medal – first place	2026 Milano Cortina	Mixed 2000 m relay
Silver medal – second place	2026 Milano Cortina	3000 m relay
World Championships
Gold medal – first place	2026 Montreal	2000 m mixed relay
Silver medal – second place	2024 Rotterdam	2000 m mixed relay
Silver medal – second place	2025 Beijing	2000 m mixed relay
Silver medal – second place	2026 Montreal	3000 m relay
Bronze medal – third place	2023 Seoul	2000 m relay
Bronze medal – third place	2026 Montreal	500 m
European Championships
Gold medal – first place	2025 Dresden	3000 m relay
Silver medal – second place	2024 Gdańsk	3000 m relay
Silver medal – second place	2026 Tilburg	3000 m relay
Bronze medal – third place	2025 Dresden	500 m

Chiara Betti (born 12 March 2002) is an Italian short-track speed skater. She represented Italy at the 2026 Winter Olympics.

== Career ==
In January 2026, she represented Italy at the 2026 European Short Track Speed Skating Championships and won a silver medal in the 3000 metre relay. She was selected to represent Italy at the 2026 Winter Olympics. She won a gold medal in the mixed 2000 metre relay and a silver medal in the 3000 metre relay. In March 2026, she competed at the 2026 World Short Track Speed Skating Championships and won a silver medal in the 3000 metre relay.
