= Bérénice Comby =

French speed skater (born 2006)

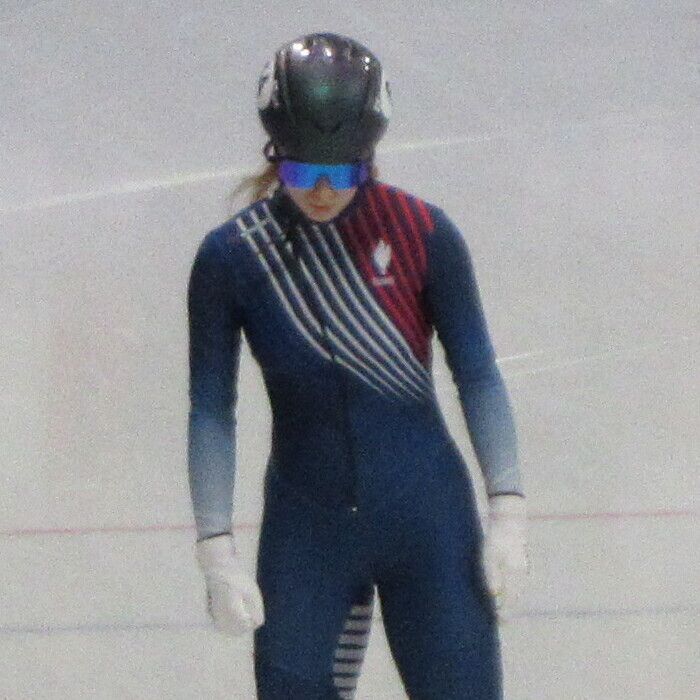
- Comby at the 2026 Winter Olympics

Personal information
- Born: 30 May 2006 (age 20) Orléans, France
- Height: 165 cm (5 ft 5 in)

Sport
- Country: France
- Sport: Short track speed skating
Medal record
Women's short-track speed skating
Representing France
European Championships
Bronze medal – third place	2024 Gdansk	3000 m relaay
Winter World University Games
Bronze medal – third place	2025 Turin	3000 m relay

Bérénice Comby (born 30 May 2006) is a French short track speed skater who competed at the 2026 Winter Olympics.

== Career ==
In January 2026 she was selected to represent France at the 2026 Winter Olympics. She competed in the 2000 metre mixed relay and advanced to the B Final, finishing in seventh place.
