= Cloé Ollivier =

French short-track speed skater (born 2004)

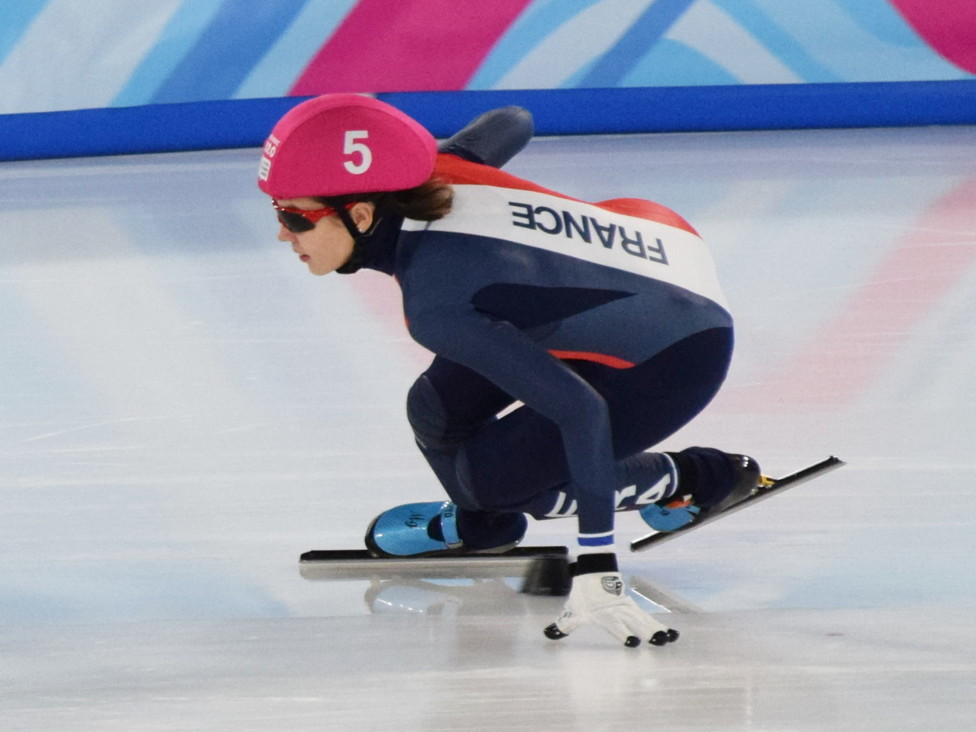
- Ollivier at the 2020 Winter Youth Olympics

Personal information
- Born: 4 February 2004 (age 22) Longueuil, Quebec, Canada
- Home town: Montaigu-Vendée

Sport
- Country: France
- Sport: Short-track speed skating
- Club: Association Choletaise de Patinage sur Glace
Medal record
Women's short-track speed skating
Representing France
European Championships
Gold medal – first place	2025 Dresden	2000 m mixed relay
Bronze medal – third place	2024 Gdansk	3000 m relay
Winter World University Games
Bronze medal – third place	2025 Turin	3000 m relay

Cloé Ollivier (French pronunciation: [kloe ɔlivje]; born 4 February 2004) is a French short-track speed skater who competed at the 2026 Winter Olympics. She also holds Canadian citizenship.

== Career ==
In January 2025, she competed at the 2025 European Short Track Speed Skating Championships and won a gold medal in the 2000 metre mixed relay.

In January 2026 she was selected to represent France at the 2026 Winter Olympics. She competed in the 2000 metre mixed relay and advanced to the B Final, finishing in seventh place.
