= Aurélie Lévêque =

French speed skater (born 2001)

Personal information
- Born: 14 July 2001 (age 24) Grenoble, France
- Height: 163 cm (5 ft 4 in)

Sport
- Country: France
- Sport: Short track speed skating
Medal record
Women's short-track speed skating
Representing France
World Championships
Silver medal – second place	2021 Dordrecht	3000 m relay
European Championships
Gold medal – first place	2021 Gdańsk	3000 m relay
Gold medal – first place	2025 Dresden	2000 m mixed relay
Bronze medal – third place	2024 Gdansk	3000 m relay
Winter World University Games
Gold medal – first place	2023 Lake Placid	2000 m mixed relay
Bronze medal – third place	2025 Turin	3000 m relay

Aurélie Lévêque (born 14 July 2001) is a French short-track speed skater who competed at the 2026 Winter Olympics.

== Career ==
In January 2025, she competed at the 2025 European Short Track Speed Skating Championships and won a gold medal in the 2000 metre mixed relay.

In January 2026 she was selected to represent France at the 2026 Winter Olympics. She competed in the 2000 metre mixed relay and advanced to the B Final, finishing in seventh place.
