= Freestyle skiing at the 2026 Winter Olympics – Men's dual moguls =

Men's dual moguls at the XXV Olympic Winter Games
- Freestyle skiing
- Venue: Livigno Aerials & Moguls Park, Valtellina
- Date: 15 February 2026
- Competitors: 29 from 10 nations

Medalists
1st place, gold medalist(s)		Mikaël Kingsbury	Canada
2nd place, silver medalist(s)		Ikuma Horishima	Japan
3rd place, bronze medalist(s)		Matt Graham	Australia

The men's dual moguls competition in freestyle skiing at the 2026 Winter Olympics was held on 15 February at the Livigno Aerials & Moguls Park in Valtellina. It was the inaugural edition of this event at the Olympics. It was won by Mikaël Kingsbury of Canada, his fifth Olympic medal and second gold. Ikuma Horishima of Japan won the silver medal, and Matt Graham of Australia the bronze medal.

== Background ==
There was only one event in 2025–26 FIS Freestyle Ski World Cup in dual moguls before the Olympics. It was won by Julien Viel, with Ikuma Horishima second and Filip Gravenfors third. Mikaël Kingsbury was the 2025 World champion.

Dual Moguls is scored differently than individual Moguls. Four judges are assigned to turns, two to air and one to speed. Judges are given five points to split between the two skiers based on the comparison between the two. The skier with the most overall points win the round.

== Seeding ==
Rank and bib	Name	Country
1	Julien Viel	Canada
2	Ikuma Horishima	Japan
3	Cooper Woods	Australia
4	Mikaël Kingsbury	Canada
5	Olli Penttala	Finland
6	Matt Graham	Australia
7	Benjamin Cavet	France
8	Walter Wallberg	Sweden
9	Charlie Mickel	United States
10	Pavel Kolmakov	Kazakhstan
11	Severi Vierelä	Finland
12	Takuya Shimakawa	Japan
13	Nick Page	United States
14	Jackson Harvey	Australia
15	Dylan Walczyk	United States
16	Thibaud Mouille	France
17	Jung Dae-yoon	South Korea
18	Goshin Fujiki	Japan
19	Paul Andréa Gay	France
20	Rasmus Stegfeldt	Sweden
21	Taketo Nishizawa	Japan
22	Landon Wendler	United States
23	Elliott Vallaincourt	Canada
25	Akseli Ahvenainen	Finland
26	Rasmus Karjalainen	Finland
27	Matyáš Kroupa	Czech Republic
28	Arthur de Villaucourt	France
29	Lee Yoon-seung	South Korea
30	George Murphy	Australia

== Results ==
=== Finals ===
1/16 Finals
1	Julien Viel (CAN)
Bye
12	Takuya Shimakawa (JPN)	20
23	Elliott Vallaincourt (CAN)	15
14	Jackson Harvey (AUS)	19
18	Goshin Fujiki (JPN)	16
25	Akseli Ahvenainen (FIN)	9
8	Walter Wallberg (SWE)	26

1/8 Finals
1	Julien Viel (CAN)	DNF
12	Takuya Shimakawa (JPN)	35
14	Jackson Harvey (AUS)	8
8	Walter Wallberg (SWE)	27

Quarterfinals
12	Takuya Shimakawa (JPN)	19
8	Walter Wallberg (SWE)	16

1/16 Finals
17	Jung Dae-yoon (KOR)	20
5	Olli Penttala (FIN)	15
16	Thibaud Mouille (FRA)	16
19	Paul Andréa Gay (FRA)	19
28	Arthur de Villaucourt (FRA)	13
10	Pavel Kolmakov (KAZ)	22
4	Mikaël Kingsbury (CAN)	25
27	Matyáš Kroupa (CZE)	10

1/8 Finals
17	Jung Dae-yoon (KOR)	26
19	Paul Andréa Gay (FRA)	9
10	Pavel Kolmakov (KAZ)	12
4	Mikaël Kingsbury (CAN)	23

Quarter Finals
17	Jung Dae-yoon (KOR)	DNF
4	Mikaël Kingsbury (CAN)	35

1/16 Finals
3	Cooper Woods (AUS)
Bye
9	Charlie Mickel (USA)	23
22	Landon Wendler (USA)	12
20	Rasmus Stegfeldt (SWE)	22
11	Severi Vierelä (FIN)	13
21	Taketo Nishizawa (JPN)	13
6	Matt Graham (AUS)	22

1/8 Finals
3	Cooper Woods (AUS)	3
9	Charlie Mickel (USA)	32
20	Rasmus Stegfeldt (SWE)	8
6	Matt Graham (AUS)	27

Quarter Finals
9	Charlie Mickel (USA)	15
6	Matt Graham (AUS)	20

1/16 Finals
30	George Murphy (AUS)	23
7	Benjamin Cavet (FRA)	12
29	Lee Yoon-seung (KOR)	12
15	Dylan Walczyk (USA)	23
26	Rasmus Karjalainen (FIN)	13
13	Nick Page (USA)	22
Bye
2	Ikuma Horishima (JPN)

1/8 Finals
30	George Murphy (AUS)	DNF
15	Dylan Walczyk (USA)	35
13	Nick Page (USA)	DNF
2	Ikuma Horishima (JPN)	35

Quarter Finals
15	Dylan Walczyk (USA)	9
2	Ikuma Horishima (JPN)	26

=== Medal Rounds ===
Semifinals
12	Takuya Shimakawa (JPN)	2
4	Mikaël Kingsbury (CAN)	33
6	Matt Graham (AUS)	14
2	Ikuma Horishima (JPN)	21

Big Final
4	Mikaël Kingsbury (CAN)	30 (gold)
2	Ikuma Horishima (JPN)	5 (silver)
Small Final
12	Takuya Shimakawa (JPN)	15
6	Matt Graham (AUS)	20 (bronze)
