= Freestyle skiing at the 2026 Winter Olympics – Men's moguls =

Men's moguls at the XXV Olympic Winter Games
- Freestyle skiing
- Venue: Livigno Aerials & Moguls Park, Valtellina
- Date: 10, 12 February 2026

Medalists
1st place, gold medalist(s)		Cooper Woods-Topalovic	Australia
2nd place, silver medalist(s)		Mikaël Kingsbury	Canada
3rd place, bronze medalist(s)		Ikuma Horishima	Japan

The men's moguls competition in freestyle skiing at the 2026 Winter Olympics was held on 10 February (qualification 1) and 12 February (qualification 2 and final), at the Livigno Aerials & Moguls Park in Valtellina. Cooper Woods-Topalovic of Australia won gold, his first Olympic medal. Mikaël Kingsbury of Canada won silver and Ikuma Horishima of Japan bronze, both replicated their 2022 performance.

== Background ==
The 2022 champion, Walter Wallberg, qualified for the event, as did the silver medalist (and the 2018 champion) Mikaël Kingsbury and the bronze medalist Ikuma Horishima. There were four events in 2025–26 FIS Freestyle Ski World Cup in moguls before the Olympics; Horishima won two of them and was leading the mogul standings. Two other events were won by Kingsbury and Matt Graham. Horishima was also the 2025 World champion.

== Results ==
=== Qualifications ===
==== Qualifying 1 ====
In the first qualifying round, the ten best athletes directly qualified for the final. The bottom twenty athletes went on to compete in the second qualification round.

Rank	Bib	Order	Name	Country	Time	Score			Total	Notes
Rank	Bib	Order	Name	Country	Time	Turns	Air	Time	Total	Notes
1	1	13	Ikuma Horishima	Japan	22.63	50.4	17.48	17.54	85.42	QF
2	5	21	Julien Viel	Canada	23.45	48.3	14.82	16.44	79.56	QF
3	6	12	Mikaël Kingsbury	Canada	22.86	46.8	15.08	17.23	79.11	QF
4	18	8	Benjamin Cavet	France	22.39	49.1	11.46	17.87	78.43	QF
5	3	11	Nick Page	United States	23.63	46.7	14.60	16.20	77.50	QF
6	7	17	Walter Wallberg	Sweden	22.69	45.2	14.71	17.46	77.37	QF
7	12	5	Dylan Walczyk	United States	23.21	47.8	12.11	16.76	76.67	QF
8	10	20	Thibaud Mouille	France	24.10	46.2	14.77	15.56	76.53	QF
9	22	27	Pavel Kolmakov	Kazakhstan	23.55	46.1	13.84	16.30	76.24	QF
10	2	15	Matt Graham	Australia	22.89	46.3	12.28	17.19	75.77	QF
11	4	18	Charlie Mickel	United States	23.57	46.3	12.73	16.28	75.31	
12	11	26	Landon Wendler	United States	23.63	46.7	12.18	16.20	75.08	
13	21	6	Takuya Shimakawa	Japan	24.06	45.8	13.40	15.62	74.82	
14	17	4	Goshin Fujiki	Japan	23.65	43.1	14.41	16.17	73.68	
15	19	24	Cooper Woods-Topalovic	Australia	23.48	45.8	11.47	16.40	73.67	
16	23	1	Elliott Vallaincourt	Canada	23.59	43.4	13.83	16.25	73.48	
17	20	23	Rasmus Stegfeldt	Sweden	23.13	43.7	12.66	16.87	73.23	
18	15	28	Olli Penttala	Finland	23.88	42.6	13.28	15.86	71.74	
19	27	10	Rasmus Karjalainen	Finland	23.40	43.8	11.25	16.51	71.56	
20	14	22	Akseli Ahvenainen	Finland	24.09	43.5	12.17	15.58	71.25	
21	13	16	Severi Vierelä	Finland	23.05	41.0	13.10	16.98	71.08	
22	16	7	Taketo Nishizawa	Japan	23.80	45.0	9.44	15.97	70.41	
23	8	19	Jackson Harvey	Australia	23.55	42.5	10.46	16.30	69.26	
24	24	29	Matyáš Kroupa	Czech Republic	24.02	41.4	11.68	15.67	68.75	
25	28	2	Arthur de Villaucourt	France	22.62	41.0	9.76	17.56	68.32	
26	25	3	George Murphy	Australia	24.22	40.0	11.79	15.40	67.19	
27	9	9	Jung Dae-yoon	South Korea	22.73	37.3	10.80	17.41	65.51	
28	29	30	Mateo Jeannesson	Great Britain	26.86	23.0	9.79	11.85	44.64	
29	26	25	Paul Andréa Gay	France	24.60	14.5	6.00	14.89	35.39	
30	30	14	Lee Yoon-seung	South Korea						DNF

==== Qualifying 2 ====
In the second qualifying round, the ten best athletes qualified for the final based on that athletes best score from either the athlete's first or second qualifying run. The bottom ten athletes were eliminated.

Rank	Bib	Order	Name	Country	Qual 1	Time	Score			Total	Best	Notes
Rank	Bib	Order	Name	Country	Qual 1	Time	Turns	Air	Time	Total	Best	Notes
1	19	15	Cooper Woods-Topalovic	Australia	73.67	23.28	47.1	16.69	16.67	80.46	80.46	QF
2	21	5	Takuya Shimakawa	Japan	74.82	23.31	46.8	14.84	16.63	78.27	78.27	QF
3	4	11	Charlie Mickel	United States	75.31	22.78	45.5	14.98	17.34	77.82	77.82	QF
4	9	7	Jung Dae-yoon	South Korea	65.51	22.53	42.8	16.88	17.68	77.36	77.36	QF
5	8	12	Jackson Harvey	Australia	69.26	23.17	46.1	14.43	16.82	77.35	77.35	QF
6	20	14	Rasmus Stegfeldt	Sweden	73.23	22.30	43.8	15.12	17.99	76.91	76.91	QF
7	11	17	Landon Wendler	United States	75.08	23.16	44.8	14.71	16.83	76.34	76.34	QF
8	23	1	Elliott Vallaincourt	Canada	73.48	23.59	44.5	15.50	16.25	76.25	76.25	QF
9	14	13	Akseli Ahvenainen	Finland	71.25	23.00	44.0	14.24	17.04	75.28	75.28	QF
10	15	18	Olli Penttala	Finland	71.74	23.19	42.5	15.99	16.79	75.28	75.28	QF
11	27	8	Rasmus Karjalainen	Finland	71.56	23.29	44.1	13.89	16.65	74.64	74.64	
12	15	6	Taketo Nishizawa	Japan	70.41	23.77	44.4	13.54	16.01	73.95	73.95	
13	17	4	Goshin Fujiki	Japan	73.68	23.29	32.9	15.89	16.65	65.44	73.68	
14	13	10	Severi Vierelä	Finland	71.08	22.99	40.7	15.89	17.06	73.65	73.65	
15	28	2	Arthur de Villaucourt	France	68.32	24.68	42.9	15.34	14.78	73.02	73.02	
16	26	16	Paul Andréa Gay	France	35.39	24.45	41.1	14.35	15.09	70.54	70.54	
17	30	9	Lee Yoon-seung	South Korea	DNF	23.30	41.0	11.71	16.64	69.35	69.35	
18	24	19	Matyáš Kroupa	Czech Republic	68.75					DNF	68.75	
19	25	3	George Murphy	Australia	67.19	26.32	25.8	13.25	12.58	51.63	67.19	
20	29	20	Mateo Jeannesson	Great Britain	44.64	23.67	28.7	11.62	16.14	56.46	56.46	

=== Final ===
==== Final 1 ====
In the first final round, the eight best athletes qualified for the second final round. The bottom twelve athletes were eliminated.

Rank	Bib	Order	Name	Country	Time	Score			Total	Notes
Rank	Bib	Order	Name	Country	Time	Turns	Air	Time	Total	Notes
1	19	10	Cooper Woods-Topalovic	Australia	22.70	48.2	17.95	17.45	83.60	QF
2	6	18	Mikaël Kingsbury	Canada	23.24	48.0	17.84	16.72	82.56	QF
3	2	11	Matt Graham	Australia	22.59	48.0	15.96	17.60	81.56	QF
4	7	15	Walter Wallberg	Sweden	22.14	46.6	16.55	18.20	81.35	QF
5	1	20	Ikuma Horishima	Japan	22.61	48.3	14.48	17.57	80.35	QF
6	3	16	Nick Page	United States	22.77	46.2	16.53	17.35	80.08	QF
7	5	19	Julien Viel	Canada	22.98	46.9	16.05	17.07	80.02	QF
8	8	6	Jackson Harvey	Australia	22.90	48.4	14.34	17.18	79.92	QF
9	10	13	Thibaud Mouille	France	23.66	45.9	17.29	16.16	79.35	
10	18	17	Benjamin Cavet	France	22.62	44.6	16.68	17.56	78.84	
11	15	1	Olli Penttala	Finland	22.21	44.6	15.43	18.11	78.14	
12	4	8	Charlie Mickel	United States	22.75	46.5	14.15	17.38	78.03	
13	12	14	Dylan Walczyk	United States	22.65	46.1	14.00	17.52	77.62	
14	23	3	Elliott Vallaincourt	Canada	22.24	43.5	15.28	18.07	76.85	
15	21	9	Takuya Shimakawa	Japan	23.22	44.7	15.09	16.75	76.54	
16	22	12	Pavel Kolmakov	Kazakhstan	23.26	44.0	15.01	16.69	75.70	
17	11	4	Landon Wendler	United States	22.52	40.7	11.81	17.69	70.20	
18	20	5	Rasmus Stegfeldt	Sweden	22.05	31.4	10.47	18.32	60.19	
19	9	7	Jung Dae-yoon	South Korea	28.87	7.9	17.23	9.15	34.28	
20	14	2	Akseli Ahvenainen	Finland	26.01	2.8	11.69	12.99	27.48	

==== Final 2 ====
The second final round determined the medal winners amongst the final eight athletes. Australia's Cooper Woods-Topalovic and Canada's Mikaël Kingsbury finished in a tie for the gold medal, with the tiebreak scenario coming down to the competitor with the higher turn component score. Woods' finished 0.7 points higher than Kingsbury's, which gave Cooper Woods-Topalovic his first Olympic Gold medal.

Rank	Bib	Order	Name	Country	Time	Score			Total	Notes
Rank	Bib	Order	Name	Country	Time	Turns	Air	Time	Total	Notes
1st place, gold medalist(s)	19	8	Cooper Woods-Topalovic	Australia	22.61	48.4	17.74	17.57	83.71	
2nd place, silver medalist(s)	6	7	Mikaël Kingsbury	Canada	22.79	47.7	18.68	17.33	83.71	
3rd place, bronze medalist(s)	1	4	Ikuma Horishima	Japan	22.23	48.3	17.06	18.08	83.44	
4	7	5	Walter Wallberg	Sweden	22.18	46.3	17.95	18.15	82.40	
5	2	6	Matt Graham	Australia	21.84	46.0	16.27	18.61	80.88	
6	5	2	Julien Viel	Canada	22.42	44.9	17.05	17.83	79.78	
7	3	3	Nick Page	United States	22.30	41.8	15.21	17.99	75.00	
8	8	1	Jackson Harvey	Australia	23.38	44.2	14.20	16.53	74.93	
