= FIS Freestyle Ski and Snowboarding World Championships 2025 – Men's moguls =

Men's moguls at the FIS Freestyle Ski and Snowboarding World Championships 2025
- Location: Corviglia, Switzerland
- Dates: 18–19 March
- Competitors: 46 from 16 nations
- Winning points: 89.03

Medalists
gold medal	Ikuma Horishima	Japan
silver medal	Mikaël Kingsbury	Canada
bronze medal	Jung Dae-yoon	South Korea

The Men's moguls competition at the FIS Freestyle Ski and Snowboarding World Championships 2025 was held on 18 and 19 March 2025.

== Qualification ==
The qualification was started at 13:00. The Qualification 2 was cancelled. The best 20 skiers qualified for the final.

Rank	Bib	Start order	Name	Country	Q1	Q2	Notes
1	7	5	Filip Gravenfors	Sweden	81.33		Q
2	1	30	Mikaël Kingsbury	Canada	80.54		Q
3	3	9	Nick Page	United States	79.09		Q
4	2	28	Ikuma Horishima	Japan	78.75		Q
5	6	11	Julien Viel	Canada	78.06		Q
6	5	27	Matt Graham	Australia	77.02		Q
7	20	8	Taketo Nishizawa	Japan	76.48		Q
8	17	2	Dylan Walczyk	United States	75.61		Q
9	23	10	Akseli Ahvenainen	Finland	74.02		Q
10	18	7	Elliot Vaillancourt	Canada	73.68		Q
11	24	20	Robin Olgård	Sweden	73.58		Q
12	9	3	Severi Vierelä	Finland	72.80		Q
13	12	26	Jung Dae-yoon	South Korea	72.67		Q
14	19	15	Asher Michel	United States	72.20		Q
15	15	18	Cooper Woods-Topalovic	Australia	72.06		Q
16	10	21	Pavel Kolmakov	Kazakhstan	71.66		Q
17	8	25	Rasmus Stegfeldt	Sweden	71.63		Q
18	11	29	Charlie Mickel	United States	71.28		Q
19	14	16	Takuya Shimakawa	Japan	70.98		Q
20	28	19	Louis-David Chalifoux	Canada	70.27		Q
21	13	14	Thibaud Mouille	France	69.85		
22	31	17	George Murphy	Australia	69.65		
23	30	1	Matyáš Kroupa	Czech Republic	69.65		
24	25	24	Lee Yoon-seung	South Korea	68.37		
25	40	42	Anton Bondarev	Kazakhstan	67.04		
26	33	32	Enea Buzzi	Switzerland	66.00		
27	45	33	Gordon Berg	Sweden	63.63		
28	32	31	Jackson Harvey	Australia	62.08		
29	42	44	Maxim Yemelyanov	Kazakhstan	61.61		
30	41	43	Fyodor Bugakov	Kazakhstan	60.10		
31	26	22	Tristan Cayolle	France	58.98		
32	38	35	Linus Merz	Germany	56.83		
33	47	37	Paul Andrea Gay	France	56.32		
34	44	41	Martino Conedera	Switzerland	54.52		
35	36	34	Antón Verdaguer	Spain	52.35		
36	37	45	Lucas Verdaguer	Spain	47.28		
37	46	40	Rostyslav Oleksiuk	Ukraine	43.89		
38	22	6	Mateo Jeannesson	Great Britain	42.31		
39	39	36	Nicolas Weese	Germany	39.98		
40	35	46	Marek Gajdečka	Czech Republic	31.47		
41	34	38	Wang Renda	China	21.05		
42	27	4	Goshin Fujiki	Japan	13.38		
	21	12	Samuel Goodison	Canada	DNF		
	16	13	Olli Penttala	Finland	DNF		
	29	23	Léo Crozet	France	DNF		
	43	39	Kim Jin-suck	South Korea	DNF		

== Final ==
The final was started at 12:02.

Rank	Bib	Name	Country	Final 1	Final 2
1st place, gold medalist(s)	2	Ikuma Horishima	Japan	85.47	89.03
2nd place, silver medalist(s)	1	Mikaël Kingsbury	Canada	82.53	82.68
3rd place, bronze medalist(s)	12	Jung Dae-yoon	South Korea	82.90	81.76
4	3	Nick Page	United States	81.54	80.77
5	5	Matt Graham	Australia	81.38	74.84
6	6	Julien Viel	Canada	81.30	58.36
7	7	Filip Gravenfors	Sweden	82.21	7.76
8	9	Severi Vierelä	Finland	81.35	DNF
9	15	Cooper Woods-Topalovic	Australia	79.64	—
10	10	Pavel Kolmakov	Kazakhstan	77.32	—
11	24	Robin Olgård	Sweden	74.97	—
12	17	Dylan Walczyk	United States	74.52	—
13	8	Rasmus Stegfeldt	Sweden	74.08	—
14	18	Elliot Vaillancourt	Canada	73.76	—
15	20	Taketo Nishizawa	Japan	73.44	—
16	11	Charlie Mickel	United States	70.69	—
17	28	Louis-David Chalifoux	Canada	65.56	—
18	14	Takuya Shimakawa	Japan	65.40	—
19	23	Akseli Ahvenainen	Finland	57.13	—
20	19	Asher Michel	United States	DNF	—
