= FIS Freestyle Ski and Snowboarding World Championships 2025 – Men's dual moguls =

Men's dual moguls at the FIS Freestyle Ski and Snowboarding World Championships 2025
- Location: Corviglia, Switzerland
- Dates: 21 March

Medalists
gold medal	Mikaël Kingsbury	Canada
silver medal	Ikuma Horishima	Japan
bronze medal	Matt Graham	Australia

The Men's dual moguls competition at the FIS Freestyle Ski and Snowboarding World Championships 2025 was held on 21 March 2025.

== Results ==
=== Finals ===
Semifinals
(Canada) Mikaël Kingsbury	35
(Australia) Matt Graham	DNF
(Sweden) Filip Gravenfors	DNF
(Japan) Ikuma Horishima	35

Final
(Canada) Mikaël Kingsbury	35
(Japan) Ikuma Horishima	DNF
Third place
(Australia) Matt Graham	35
(Sweden) Filip Gravenfors	DNF

=== Top half ===
==== Section 1 ====
Round of 64
40	(Czech Republic) Marek Gajdečka	DNF
36	(Switzerland) Enea Buzzi	35
35	(Kazakhstan) Anton Bondarev	35
29	(Kazakhstan) Fyodor Bugakov	DNF
41	(Spain) Lucas Verdaguer Forn	DNF
18	(Canada) Samuel Goodison	35

Round of 32
1	(Canada) Mikaël Kingsbury	35
36	(Switzerland) Enea Buzzi	DNF
28	(Australia) Jackson Harvey	17
15	(Japan) Takuya Shimakawa	18
9	(Kazakhstan) Pavel Kolmakov	28
35	(Kazakhstan) Anton Bondarev	7
18	(Canada) Samuel Goodison	15
7	(Finland) Severi Vierelä	20

Round of 16
1	(Canada) Mikaël Kingsbury	19
15	(Japan) Takuya Shimakawa	16
9	(Kazakhstan) Pavel Kolmakov	20
7	(Finland) Severi Vierelä	15

Quarterfinals
1	(Canada) Mikaël Kingsbury	25
9	(Kazakhstan) Pavel Kolmakov	10

==== Section 2 ====
Round of 64
22	(Czech Republic) Matyáš Kroupa	27
44	(Spain) Anton Verdaguer Forn	8
23	(Japan) Goshin Fujiki	30
37	(Kazakhstan) Maxim Yemelyanov	5
31	(France) Léo Crozet	DNF
45	(Ukraine) Rostyslav Oleksiuk	35
25	(Germany) Nicolas Weese	DNF
33	(France) Paul Andrea Gay	35

Round of 32
4	(Australia) Matt Graham	22
22	(Czech Republic) Matyáš Kroupa	13
23	(Japan) Goshin Fujiki	16
19	(Sweden) Robin Olgaard	19
13	(United Kingdom) Mateo Jeannesson	33
45	(Ukraine) Rostyslav Oleksiuk	2
33	(France) Paul Andrea Gay	16
5	(United States) Nick Page	19

Round of 16
4	(Australia) Matt Graham	19
19	(Sweden) Robin Olgaard	16
13	(United Kingdom) Mateo Jeannesson	23
5	(United States) Nick Page	12

Quarterfinals
4	(Australia) Matt Graham	23
13	(United Kingdom) Mateo Jeannesson	12

=== Bottom half ===
==== Section 3 ====
Round of 64
30	(Canada) Louis-David Chalifoux	24
42	(Switzerland) Martino Conedera	11
32	(Sweden) Gordon Berg	DNF
27	(Australia) George Murphy	35
39	(South Korea) Kim Jin-suck	DNF
14	(United States) Asher Michel	35

Round of 32
3	(Sweden) Filip Gravenfors	21
30	(Canada) Louis-David Chalifoux	14
26	(South Korea) Lee Yoon-seung	17
12	(United States) Dylan Walczyk	18
8	(United States) Charlie Mickel	20
27	(Australia) George Murphy	15
14	(United States) Asher Michel	13
10	(Sweden) Rasmus Stegfeldt	22

Round of 16
3	(Sweden) Filip Gravenfors	35
12	(United States) Dylan Walczyk	DNF
8	(United States) Charlie Mickel	18
10	(Sweden) Rasmus Stegfeldt	17

Quarterfinals
3	(Sweden) Filip Gravenfors	25
8	(United States) Charlie Mickel	10

==== Section 4 ====
Round of 64
43	(China) Renda Wang	DNF
21	(France) Thibaud Mouille	35
34	(France) Tristan Cayolle	20
24	(Finland) Akseli Ahvenainen	15
38	(Germany) Linus Merz	1
33	(Finland) Olli Penttala	34

Round of 32
6	(Canada) Julien Viel	6
21	(France) Thibaud Mouille	29
34	(France) Tristan Cayolle	DNF
11	(Australia) Cooper Woods	35
16	(Canada) Elliot Vaillancourt	20
20	(Japan) Taketo Nishizawa	15
17	(Finland) Olli Penttala	11
2	(Japan) Ikuma Horishima	24

Round of 16
21	(France) Thibaud Mouille	16
11	(Australia) Cooper Woods	19
16	(Canada) Elliot Vaillancourt	DNF
2	(Japan) Ikuma Horishima	35

Quarterfinals
11	(Australia) Cooper Woods	2
2	(Japan) Ikuma Horishima	33
