= Sweden at the 2026 Winter Olympics =

- Flag of Sweden
- IOC code: SWE
- NOC: Swedish Olympic Committee
- Website: www.sok.se (in Swedish)

in Milan and Cortina d'Ampezzo, Italy 6 February 2026 – 22 February 2026
- Competitors: 110 (57 men and 53 women) in 9 sports
- Flag bearers (opening): Walter Wallberg & Sara Hector
- Flag bearer (closing): Ebba Andersson
- Medals Ranked 7th: Gold 8 Silver 6 Bronze 4 Total 18

Winter Olympics appearances (overview)
- 1924; 1928; 1932; 1936; 1948; 1952; 1956; 1960; 1964; 1968; 1972; 1976; 1980; 1984; 1988; 1992; 1994; 1998; 2002; 2006; 2010; 2014; 2018; 2022; 2026

Sweden competed at the 2026 Winter Olympics in Milan and Cortina d'Ampezzo, Italy, which was held from 6 to 22 February 2026. This is Sweden's 25th appearance at the Olympic Winter Games, having competed at every edition since the inaugural games in 1924 and having also won medals at every previous Winter Olympics.

Reigning Olympic champions Sara Hector and Walter Wallberg were the country's flagbearers during the opening ceremony, while Ebba Andersson, who won four medals in 2026, was the country's flagbearer during the closing ceremony.

Sweden matched their record 8 gold medals and 18 medals from 2022, but narrowly beat the medal count from those games by having 1 more silver (and 1 less bronze).

15 of Sweden's medals were won in women's events, with only two won in men's events and one in mixed. Sweden's cross-country skiing team led the way with ten medals, of which five were gold. The curling teams were also very successful, winning gold in two of the three curling events.

In the women's sprint event in cross-country skiing, the Swedish skiers Linn Svahn, Jonna Sundling and Maja Dahlqvist managed to win gold, silver and bronze respectively, which was the fourth time Sweden won a triple at a Winter Olympic event. The previous triples occurred in 1928, 1936 and 1948. (They also won a triple in figure skating at the 1908 Summer Olympics.)

== Competitors ==
The following is the list of number of competitors participating at the Games per sport/discipline.

Sport	Men	Women	Total
Alpine skiing	2	5	7
Biathlon	6	6	12
Cross-country skiing	8	8	16
Curling	5	6	11
Figure skating	2	1	3
Freestyle skiing	8	2	10
Ice hockey	25	23	48
Luge	1	1	2
Ski jumping	0	1	1
Total	57	53	110^{1}

^{1} SOC selected 111 athletes, but Filip Gravenfors was injured before the games started and was unable to compete.

== Medalists ==
The following Swedish competitors won medals at the Games. In the discipline sections below, the medalists' names are bolded.

Medal	Name	Sport	Event	Date
Gold	Frida Karlsson	Cross-country skiing	Women's 20 km skiathlon	7 February
Gold	Linn Svahn	Cross-country skiing	Women's sprint	10 February
Gold	Isabella Wranå; Rasmus Wranå	Curling	Mixed doubles	10 February
Gold	Frida Karlsson	Cross-country skiing	Women's 10 km freestyle	12 February
Gold	Martin Ponsiluoma	Biathlon	Men's pursuit	15 February
Gold	Jonna Sundling; Maja Dahlqvist	Cross-country skiing	Women's team sprint	18 February
Gold	Ebba Andersson	Cross-country skiing	Women's 50 km classical	22 February
Gold	Anna Hasselborg; Sara McManus; Agnes Knochenhauer; Sofia Scharback; Johanna Heldin	Curling	Women's tournament	22 February
Silver	Ebba Andersson	Cross-country skiing	Women's 20 km skiathlon	7 February
Silver	Jonna Sundling	Cross-country skiing	Women's sprint	10 February
Silver	Ebba Andersson	Cross-country skiing	Women's 10 km freestyle	12 February
Silver	Linn Svahn; Ebba Andersson; Frida Karlsson; Jonna Sundling	Cross-country skiing	Women's 4 × 7.5 kilometre relay	14 February
Silver	Sara Hector	Alpine skiing	Women's giant slalom	15 February
Silver	Linn Gestblom; Anna Magnusson; Elvira Öberg; Hanna Öberg	Biathlon	Women's relay	18 February
Bronze	Maja Dahlqvist	Cross-country skiing	Women's sprint	10 February
Bronze	Viktor Brandt; Jesper Nelin; Martin Ponsiluoma; Sebastian Samuelsson	Biathlon	Men's relay	17 February
Bronze	Anna Swenn-Larsson	Alpine skiing	Women's slalom	18 February
Bronze	Sandra Näslund	Freestyle skiing	Women's ski cross	20 February

Medals by date
**Day**	**Date**	1st place, gold medalist(s)	2nd place, silver medalist(s)	3rd place, bronze medalist(s)	Total
1	7 February	1	1	0	2
2	8 February	0	0	0	0
3	9 February	0	0	0	0
4	10 February	2	1	1	4
5	11 February	0	0	0	0
6	12 February	1	1	0	2
7	13 February	0	0	0	0
8	14 February	0	1	0	1
9	15 February	1	1	0	2
10	16 February	0	0	0	0
11	17 February	0	0	1	1
12	18 February	1	1	1	3
13	19 February	0	0	0	0
14	20 February	0	0	1	1
15	21 February	0	0	0	0
17	22 February	2	0	0	2
Total		8	6	4	18

Medals by sport
Sport	1st place, gold medalist(s)	2nd place, silver medalist(s)	3rd place, bronze medalist(s)	Total
Cross-country skiing	5	4	1	**10**
Curling	2	0	0	**2**
Biathlon	1	1	1	**3**
Alpine skiing	0	1	1	**2**
Freestyle skiing	0	0	1	**1**
Total	8	6	4	18

Medals by gender
Gender	1st place, gold medalist(s)	2nd place, silver medalist(s)	3rd place, bronze medalist(s)	Total
Male	1	0	1	**2**
Female	6	6	3	**15**
Mixed	1	0	0	**1**
Total	8	6	4	18

Multiple medalists
**Name**	**Sport**	1st place, gold medalist(s)	2nd place, silver medalist(s)	3rd place, bronze medalist(s)	Total
Frida Karlsson	Cross-country skiing	2	1	0	3
Ebba Andersson	Cross-country skiing	1	3	0	4
Jonna Sundling	Cross-country skiing	1	2	0	3
Linn Svahn	Cross-country skiing	1	1	0	2
Maja Dahlqvist	Cross-country skiing	1	0	1	2
Martin Ponsiluoma	Biathlon	1	0	1	2

== Alpine skiing ==
Sweden qualified five female and two male alpine skiers. SOC selected Sara Hector, Anna Swenn-Larsson, Estelle Alphand, Cornelia Öhlund, Hanna Aronsson Elfman, Fabian Ax Swartz and Kristoffer Jakobsen.

Men

Athlete	Event	Run 1		Run 2		Total	
Athlete	Event	Time	Rank	Time	Rank	Time	Rank
Fabian Ax Swartz	Giant slalom	1:17.42	23	1:11.34	19	2:28.76	22
Fabian Ax Swartz	Slalom	59.19	17	57:39	8	1:56.58	14
Kristoffer Jakobsen	Slalom	DNF					

Women

Athlete	Event	Run 1		Run 2		Total	
Athlete	Event	Time	Rank	Time	Rank	Time	Rank
Estelle Alphand	Giant slalom	1:06.02	31	1:11.37	26	2:17.39	27
Hanna Aronsson Elfman	Giant slalom	1:05.50	27	1:09.85	6	2:15.35	21
Hanna Aronsson Elfman	Slalom	Did not finish					
Sara Hector	Giant slalom	1:03.97	4	1:10.15	11	2:14.12	2nd place, silver medalist(s)
Sara Hector	Slalom	48.84	11	Did not finish			
Anna Swenn-Larsson	Slalom	48.29	5	52.52	9	1:40.81	3rd place, bronze medalist(s)
Cornelia Öhlund	Slalom	48.13	3	Did not finish			

== Biathlon ==
Sweden qualified six female and six male biathletes through the 2024–25 Biathlon World Cup score. The first biathletes to be selected were Martin Ponsiluoma, Sebastian Samuelsson, Elvira Öberg and Hanna Öberg. In December, Ella Halvarsson, Anna Magnusson, Viktor Brandt, Jesper Nelin and Malte Stefansson were selected by SOC. Linn Gestblom, Henning Sjökvist and Anna-Karin Heijdenberg were added in January.

Men

Athlete	Event	Time	Misses	Rank
Viktor Brandt	Individual	57:38.3	4 (1+0+0+3)	37
Jesper Nelin	Individual	54:45.3	2 (1+0+0+1)	12
Jesper Nelin	Sprint	26:23.0	5 (2+3)	72
Jesper Nelin	Mass start	44:17.3	7 (0+1+3+3)	26
Martin Ponsiluoma	Individual	54:26.2	3 (0+0+2+1)	9
Martin Ponsiluoma	Sprint	23:39.8	2 (1+1)	7
Martin Ponsiluoma	Pursuit	31:11.9	1 (0+1+0+0)	1st place, gold medalist(s)
Martin Ponsiluoma	Mass start	43:03.8	7 (2+3+1+1)	21
Sebastian Samuelsson	Individual	54:00.8	2 (0+0+0+2)	7
Sebastian Samuelsson	Sprint	23:18.1	0 (0+0)	5
Sebastian Samuelsson	Pursuit	33:34.6	5 (1+0+1+3)	12
Sebastian Samuelsson	Mass start	42:52.1	4 (0+2+1+1)	18
Malte Stefansson	Sprint	25:23.9	2 (2+0)	43
Malte Stefansson	Pursuit	37:01.4	6 (3+0+1+2)	52
Viktor Brandt; Jesper Nelin; Martin Ponsiluoma; Sebastian Samuelsson	Team relay	1:20:52.7	6 (0+6)	3rd place, bronze medalist(s)

Women

Athlete	Event	Time	Misses	Rank
Linn Gestblom	Individual	43:28.2	2 (0+1+1+0)	9
Linn Gestblom	Sprint	22:13.7	2 (0+2)	22
Linn Gestblom	Pursuit	31:47.2	2 (0+0+2+0)	10
Linn Gestblom	Mass start	40:23.0	5 (0+2+1+2)	25
Anna Magnusson	Individual	43:39.9	2 (1+0+0+1)	12
Anna Magnusson	Sprint	22:37.9	3 (2+1)	35
Anna Magnusson	Pursuit	32:29.4	3 (2+0+1+0)	17
Anna Magnusson	Mass start	37:44.7	0 (0+0+0+0)	4
Elvira Öberg	Individual	43:42.0	2 (1+1+0+0)	13
Elvira Öberg	Sprint	22:18.7	2 (0+2)	27
Elvira Öberg	Pursuit	32:49.9	5 (1+2+0+2)	23
Elvira Öberg	Mass start	37:50.0	1 (0+0+0+1)	6
Hanna Öberg	Individual	45:20.2	3 (2+0+0+1)	41
Hanna Öberg	Sprint	22:07.8	2 (0+2)	18
Hanna Öberg	Pursuit	31:31.5	2 (1+0+0+1)	8
Hanna Öberg	Mass start	38:21.2	3 (1+1+1+0)	10
Linn Gestblom; Anna Magnusson; Elvira Öberg; Hanna Öberg	Team relay	1:11:14.0	8 (1+7)	2nd place, silver medalist(s)

Mixed

Athlete	Event	Time	Misses	Rank
Sebastian Samuelsson; Martin Ponsiluoma; Anna Magnusson; Hanna Öberg	Relay	1:05:56.3	2+7 (0+3 2+4)	5

== Cross-country skiing ==
Sweden qualified one female and one male cross-country skier through the basic quota. Following the completioln of the 2024–25 FIS Cross-Country World Cup, Sweden qualified a further seven female and six male athletes. The first cross-country skiers to be selected were Ebba Andersson, Edvin Anger, Frida Karlsson, William Poromaa and Jonna Sundling. In December, Maja Dahlqvist, Johanna Hagström, Moa Ilar, Emma Ribom, Linn Svahn, Anton Grahn and Alvar Myhlback were also selected by SOC. Gustaf Berglund, Truls Gisselman, Calle Halfvarsson and Johan Häggström were added in January.

Distance
Men

Athlete	Event	Classical		Freestyle		Total		
Athlete	Event	Time	Rank	Time	Rank	Time	Deficit	Rank
Edvin Anger	10 km freestyle	—N/a				22:35.8	+1:59.6	42
Edvin Anger	20 km skiathlon	25:26.7	43	23:30.7	24	49:26.8	+3:15.8	37
Gustaf Berglund	10 km freestyle	—N/a				22:13.2	+1:37.0	29
Gustaf Berglund	20 km skiathlon	24:25.1	26	24:31.3	44	49:28.0	+3:17.0	39
Gustaf Berglund	50 km classical	—N/a				2:11:58.5	+5:13.7	9
Truls Gisselman	10 km freestyle	—N/a				22:34.9	+1:58.7	40
Truls Gisselman	20 km skiathlon	23:27.4	8	22:51.6	14	46:47.8	+36.8	7
Calle Halfvarsson	50 km classical	—N/a				2:19:24.3	+12:39.5	24
Johan Häggström	50 km classical	—N/a				2:19:55.5	+13:10.7	25
William Poromaa	10 km freestyle	—N/a				21:51.6	+1:15.4	20
William Poromaa	20 km skiathlon	24:09.1	20	22:46.5	13	47:22.1	+1:11.1	12
Johan Häggström; Calle Halfvarsson; William Poromaa; Edvin Anger	4 × 7.5 km relay	LEG 1; 16:53.0; Leg rank 10 +37.9	LEG 2; 17:33.6; Leg rank 10 +1:39.4	LEG 3; 16:11.6; Leg rank 6 +2:26.3	LEG 4; 17:15.10; Leg rank 9 +3:28.8	1:07:53.3	+3:28.8	10

Women

Athlete	Event	Classical		Freestyle		Total		
Athlete	Event	Time	Rank	Time	Rank	Time	Deficit	Rank
Ebba Andersson	10 km freestyle	—N/a				23:35.8	+46.6	2nd place, silver medalist(s)
Ebba Andersson	20 km skiathlon	27:25.3	3	26:41.1	4	54:36.2	+51.0	2nd place, silver medalist(s)
Ebba Andersson	50 km classical	—N/a				2:16:28.2	—	1st place, gold medalist(s)
Moa Ilar	10 km freestyle	—N/a				24:17.5	+1:28.3	11
Moa Ilar	20 km skiathlon	28:18.3	10	28:38.0	29	57:26.2	+3:41.0	14
Frida Karlsson	10 km freestyle	—N/a				22:49.2	—	1st place, gold medalist(s)
Frida Karlsson	20 km skiathlon	27:24.4	1	25:49.7	1	53:45.2	—	1st place, gold medalist(s)
Frida Karlsson	50 km classical	—N/a				Did not start		
Emma Ribom	10 km freestyle	—N/a				24:27.9	+1:38.7	13
Emma Ribom	50 km classical	—N/a				2:25:18.6	+8:50.4	10
Jonna Sundling	20 km skiathlon	27:57.6	4	28:17.4	22	56:49.5	+3:04.3	11
Jonna Sundling	50 km classical	—N/a				Did not start		
Linn Svahn; Ebba Andersson; Frida Karlsson; Jonna Sundling	4 × 7.5 km relay	LEG 1; 19:07.6; Leg rank 1; 0.0	LEG 2; 20:58.4; Leg rank 12 +1:18.4	LEG 3; 18:06.6; Leg rank 1 +1:06.8	LEG 4; 18:23.1; Leg rank 1 +50.9	1:16:35.7	+50.9	2nd place, silver medalist(s)

Sprint
Men

Athlete	Event	Qualification		Quarterfinal		Semifinal		Final	
Athlete	Event	Time	Rank	Time	Rank	Time	Rank	Time	Rank
Edvin Anger	Sprint	3:17.31	19 Q	3:31.15	4	Did not advance			20
Anton Grahn	Sprint	3:18.21	25 Q	3:38.25	1 Q	3:44.53	5	DNA	10
Johan Häggström	Sprint	3:18.73	30 Q	RAL	6	Did not advance			30
Alvar Myhlback	Sprint	3:14.53	7 Q	3:28.39	2 Q	3:44.47	5	DNA	9
Johan Häggström; Edvin Anger	Team sprint	—N/a				5:55.20	12 Q	18:46.6	10

Women

Athlete	Event	Qualification		Quarterfinal		Semifinal		Final	
Athlete	Event	Time	Rank	Time	Rank	Time	Rank	Time	Rank
Maja Dahlqvist	Sprint	3:41.47	7 Q	3:58.22	1 Q	4:14.85	2 Q	4:07.88	3rd place, bronze medalist(s)
Johanna Hagström	Sprint	3:38.85	3 Q	3:57.96	3	Did not advance			13
Jonna Sundling	Sprint	3:37.24	2 Q	3:55.29	1 Q	4:09.60	1 Q	4:04.64	2nd place, silver medalist(s)
Linn Svahn	Sprint	3:36.21	1 Q	3:55.44	1 Q	4:10.36	2 Q	4:03.05	1st place, gold medalist(s)
Jonna Sundling; Maja Dahlqvist	Team sprint	—N/a				6:29.94	1 Q	20:29.99	1st place, gold medalist(s)

== Curling ==
Summary

Team	Event	Group stage										Semifinal	Final / BM	
Team	Event	Opposition Score	Opposition Score	Opposition Score	Opposition Score	Opposition Score	Opposition Score	Opposition Score	Opposition Score	Opposition Score	Rank	Opposition Score	Opposition Score	Rank
Niklas Edin; Oskar Eriksson; Rasmus Wranå; Christoffer Sundgren; Simon Olofsson	Men's tournament	ITA; L 6–7	GBR; L 3–6	CAN; L 6–8	CHN; W 6–4	USA; L 5–8	GER; L 3–7	SUI; L 4–9	NOR; W 7–4	CZE; L 4–10	9	Did not advance		
Anna Hasselborg; Sara McManus; Agnes Knochenhauer; Sofia Scharback; Johanna Heldin	Women's tournament	JPN; W 8–4	USA; W 9–4	DEN; W 6–5	ITA; W 8–6	GBR; W 10–7	SUI; W 6–4	CAN; L 6–8	KOR; L 3–8	CHN; W 9–4	1 Q	CAN; W 6–3	SUI; W 6–5	1st place, gold medalist(s)
Isabella Wranå; Rasmus Wranå	Mixed doubles tournament	KOR; W 10–3	CZE; W 7–4	EST; L 5–7	GBR; L 4–7	NOR; L 0–9	SUI; W 13–7	ITA; W 9–4	CAN; W 7–6	USA; L 7–8	4 Q	GBR; W 9–3	USA; W 6–5	1st place, gold medalist(s)

=== Men's tournament ===
Sweden qualified a men's team by finishing in the top seven based on the combined points at the 2024 and 2025 World Championships. Team Niklas Edin was selected as the Swedish representatives in May 2025.

Final Round Robin Standings
Team	Skip	Pld	W	L	W–L	PF	PA	EW	EL	BE	SE	S%	DSC	Qualification
Switzerland	Yannick Schwaller	9	9	0	–	75	40	42	30	3	8	88.7%	9.506	Playoffs
Canada	Brad Jacobs	9	7	2	–	63	45	40	28	8	13	86.5%	28.844	Playoffs
Norway	Magnus Ramsfjell	9	5	4	1–0	60	61	37	38	6	7	80.8%	26.938	Playoffs
Great Britain	Bruce Mouat	9	5	4	0–1	63	48	39	33	2	10	86.4%	16.613	Playoffs
United States	Daniel Casper	9	4	5	1–1	52	65	34	37	5	3	81.7%	17.663	
Italy	Joël Retornaz	9	4	5	1–1	58	67	33	39	6	7	83.0%	17.869	
Germany	Marc Muskatewitz	9	4	5	1–1	51	57	36	37	8	7	84.4%	24.850	
Czech Republic	Lukáš Klíma	9	3	6	–	54	63	35	41	3	5	79.8%	29.013	
Sweden	Niklas Edin	9	2	7	1–0	44	63	31	39	6	3	82.5%	26.000	
China	Xu Xiaoming	9	2	7	0–1	52	63	35	40	3	5	81.4%	34.875	

Source: Official website

Round robin
Sweden had a bye in draws 3, 7 and 11.

Draw 1
Wednesday, 11 February, 19:05

Sheet A	1	2	3	4	5	6	7	8	9	10	Final
Sweden (Edin) 🔨	0	0	0	1	0	2	0	2	0	1	6
Italy (Retornaz)	1	0	0	0	3	0	1	0	2	0	7

Draw 2
Thursday, 12 February, 14:05

Sheet C	1	2	3	4	5	6	7	8	9	10	Final
Great Britain (Mouat) 🔨	2	0	0	1	1	0	2	0	X	X	6
Sweden (Edin)	0	0	1	0	0	1	0	1	X	X	3

Draw 4
Friday, 13 February, 19:05

Sheet D	1	2	3	4	5	6	7	8	9	10	Final
Canada (Jacobs)	0	0	2	0	1	0	0	4	0	1	8
Sweden (Edin) 🔨	1	0	0	1	0	2	0	0	2	0	6

Draw 5
Saturday, 14 February, 14:05

Sheet B	1	2	3	4	5	6	7	8	9	10	Final
Sweden (Edin) 🔨	2	0	0	1	0	0	1	0	2	0	6
China (Xu)	0	1	0	0	1	0	0	1	0	1	4

Draw 6
Sunday, 15 February, 9:05

Sheet A	1	2	3	4	5	6	7	8	9	10	Final
United States (Casper)	0	1	0	3	0	1	1	0	2	X	8
Sweden (Edin) 🔨	1	0	1	0	1	0	0	2	0	X	5

Draw 8
Monday, 16 February, 14:05

Sheet C	1	2	3	4	5	6	7	8	9	10	Final
Sweden (Edin) 🔨	0	1	0	1	0	0	1	0	0	0	3
Germany (Muskatewitz)	0	0	2	0	1	1	0	1	1	1	7

Draw 9
Tuesday, 17 February, 9:05

Sheet B	1	2	3	4	5	6	7	8	9	10	Final
Switzerland (Schwaller) 🔨	2	2	0	0	2	0	3	X	X	X	9
Sweden (Edin)	0	0	1	0	0	3	0	X	X	X	4

Draw 10
Tuesday, 17 February, 19:05

Sheet D	1	2	3	4	5	6	7	8	9	10	Final
Sweden (Edin) 🔨	0	2	0	2	0	1	0	2	0	X	7
Norway (Ramsfjell)	1	0	0	0	0	0	2	0	1	X	4

Draw 12
Thursday, 19 February, 9:05

Sheet A	1	2	3	4	5	6	7	8	9	10	Final
Sweden (Edin)	0	1	0	0	1	2	0	0	X	X	4
Czech Republic (Klíma) 🔨	1	0	2	2	0	0	2	3	X	X	10

=== Women's tournament ===
Sweden qualified a women's team by finishing in the top seven based on the combined points at the 2024 and 2025 World Championships. Team Anna Hasselborg was selected as the Swedish representatives in May 2025.

Final Round Robin Standings
Team	Skip	Pld	W	L	W–L	PF	PA	EW	EL	BE	SE	S%	DSC	Qualification
Sweden	Anna Hasselborg	9	7	2	–	65	50	45	32	5	14	81.7%	25.806	Playoffs
United States	Tabitha Peterson	9	6	3	2–0	60	54	40	37	3	13	82.1%	34.288	Playoffs
Switzerland	Silvana Tirinzoni	9	6	3	1–1	60	51	35	42	6	4	85.0%	44.338	Playoffs
Canada	Rachel Homan	9	6	3	0–2	76	59	45	38	2	9	80.3%	19.781	Playoffs
South Korea	Gim Eun-ji	9	5	4	1–0	60	53	37	35	8	11	81.2%	23.581	
Great Britain	Sophie Jackson	9	5	4	0–1	58	58	36	36	10	8	83.4%	16.938	
Denmark	Madeleine Dupont	9	4	5	–	49	58	36	38	3	11	77.0%	37.875	
Japan	Sayaka Yoshimura	9	2	7	1–1	51	69	35	43	3	6	78.6%	27.513	
Italy	Stefania Constantini	9	2	7	1–1	47	60	34	40	3	4	78.8%	34.719	
China	Wang Rui	9	2	7	1–1	56	70	37	39	3	9	82.7%	41.206	

Source: Official website

Round robin
Sweden had a bye in draws 4, 8 and 12.

Draw 1
Thursday, 12 February, 9:05

Sheet B	1	2	3	4	5	6	7	8	9	10	Final
Japan (Yoshimura)	0	0	1	0	0	2	0	1	0	X	4
Sweden (Hasselborg) 🔨	0	1	0	3	1	0	2	0	1	X	8

Draw 2
Thursday, 12 February, 19:05

Sheet D	1	2	3	4	5	6	7	8	9	10	Final
Sweden (Hasselborg) 🔨	0	1	0	0	2	1	0	1	1	3	9
United States (Peterson)	0	0	1	1	0	0	2	0	0	0	4

Draw 3
Friday, 13 February, 14:05

Sheet A	1	2	3	4	5	6	7	8	9	10	Final
Denmark (Dupont)	0	2	0	0	1	0	1	0	1	0	5
Sweden (Hasselborg) 🔨	0	0	1	2	0	1	0	1	0	1	6

Draw 5
Saturday, 14 February, 19:05

Sheet D	1	2	3	4	5	6	7	8	9	10	Final
Italy (Constantini) 🔨	0	2	0	2	0	0	1	0	1	0	6
Sweden (Hasselborg)	1	0	2	0	2	1	0	1	0	1	8

Draw 6
Sunday, 15 February, 14:05

Sheet C	1	2	3	4	5	6	7	8	9	10	Final
Great Britain (Jackson) 🔨	2	0	1	0	0	0	2	0	2	0	7
Sweden (Hasselborg)	0	3	0	3	1	1	0	1	0	1	10

Draw 7
Monday, 16 February, 9:05

Sheet B	1	2	3	4	5	6	7	8	9	10	Final
Sweden (Hasselborg) 🔨	0	1	0	2	0	1	0	1	0	1	6
Switzerland (Tirinzoni)	0	0	2	0	1	0	0	0	1	0	4

Draw 9
Tuesday, 17 February, 14:05

Sheet A	1	2	3	4	5	6	7	8	9	10	Final
Sweden (Hasselborg)	0	0	1	0	3	0	1	0	1	0	6
Canada (Homan) 🔨	0	2	0	1	0	1	0	2	0	2	8

Draw 10
Wednesday, 18 February, 9:05

Sheet C	1	2	3	4	5	6	7	8	9	10	Final
Sweden (Hasselborg)	0	0	0	0	1	1	1	X	X	X	3
South Korea (Gim) 🔨	3	1	2	2	0	0	0	X	X	X	8

Draw 11
Wednesday, 18 February, 19:05

Sheet D	1	2	3	4	5	6	7	8	9	10	Final
China (Wang)	0	0	0	3	0	0	1	0	X	X	4
Sweden (Hasselborg) 🔨	0	2	2	0	1	1	0	3	X	X	9

Semifinal

Friday, 20 February, 14:05

Sheet B	1	2	3	4	5	6	7	8	9	10	Final
Sweden (Hasselborg) 🔨	1	0	1	0	0	2	1	0	1	X	6
Canada (Homan)	0	1	0	1	0	0	0	1	0	X	3

Gold medal game

Sunday, 22 February, 11:05

Sheet C	1	2	3	4	5	6	7	8	9	10	Final
Sweden (Hasselborg) 🔨	2	0	0	0	1	0	1	1	0	1	6
Switzerland (Tirinzoni)	0	0	0	1	0	2	0	0	2	0	5

=== Mixed doubles tournament ===
Sweden qualified a mixed doubles team by finishing in the top seven based on the combined points at the 2024 and 2025 World Championships. Siblings Isabella Wranå and Rasmus Wranå were selected as the Swedish representatives in May 2025.

Final Round Robin Standings
Team	Athletes	Pld	W	L	W–L	PF	PA	EW	EL	BE	SE	S%	DSC	Qualification
Great Britain	Jennifer Dodds / Bruce Mouat	9	8	1	–	69	46	37	30	0	11	79.6%	20.931	Playoffs
Italy	Stefania Constantini / Amos Mosaner	9	6	3	1–0	60	50	32	31	1	11	78.3%	27.931	Playoffs
United States	Cory Thiesse / Korey Dropkin	9	6	3	0–1	58	45	36	33	0	12	83.1%	25.900	Playoffs
Sweden	Isabella Wranå / Rasmus Wranå	9	5	4	–	62	55	31	34	0	9	80.1%	19.413	Playoffs
Canada	Jocelyn Peterman / Brett Gallant	9	4	5	2–0	58	52	35	31	0	10	78.5%	36.050	
Norway	Kristin Skaslien / Magnus Nedregotten	9	4	5	1–1	52	47	37	33	0	12	77.1%	24.444	
Switzerland	Briar Schwaller-Hürlimann / Yannick Schwaller	9	4	5	0–2	56	67	32	35	0	6	74.5%	24.000	
Czech Republic	Julie Zelingrová / Vít Chabičovský	9	3	6	1–0	45	62	30	34	0	6	69.1%	16.019	
South Korea	Kim Seon-yeong / Jeong Yeong-seok	9	3	6	0–1	47	64	32	34	0	9	75.1%	42.425	
Estonia	Marie Kaldvee / Harri Lill	9	2	7	–	46	65	32	39	0	7	71.6%	19.300	

Source: Official website

Round robin
Sweden had a bye in draws 3, 9, 10, and 13.

Draw 1
Wednesday, 4 February, 19:05

Sheet A	1	2	3	4	5	6	7	8	Final
Sweden (Wranå / Wranå)	0	2	0	3	4	1	X	X	10
South Korea (Kim / Jeong) 🔨	1	0	2	0	0	0	X	X	3

Draw 2
Thursday, 5 February, 10:05

Sheet B	1	2	3	4	5	6	7	8	Final
Czech Republic (Zelingrová / Chabičovský) 🔨	0	1	0	0	1	0	2	X	4
Sweden (Wranå / Wranå)	1	0	1	2	0	3	0	X	7

Draw 4
Thursday, 5 February, 19:05

Sheet C	1	2	3	4	5	6	7	8	Final
Estonia (Kaldvee / Lill)	0	3	0	1	1	1	0	1	7
Sweden (Wranå / Wranå) 🔨	1	0	2	0	0	0	2	0	5

Draw 5
Friday, 6 February, 10:05

Sheet B	1	2	3	4	5	6	7	8	Final
Sweden (Wranå / Wranå)	0	0	2	1	0	1	0	X	4
Great Britain (Dodds / Mouat) 🔨	1	3	0	0	2	0	1	X	7

Draw 6
Friday, 6 February, 14:35

Sheet D	1	2	3	4	5	6	7	8	Final
Sweden (Wranå / Wranå) 🔨	0	0	0	0	0	0	X	X	0
Norway (Skaslien / Nedregotten)	1	1	3	1	2	1	X	X	9

Draw 7
Saturday, 7 February, 10:05

Sheet D	1	2	3	4	5	6	7	8	Final
Switzerland (Schwaller-Hürlimann / Schwaller)	0	1	0	4	0	2	0	0	7
Sweden (Wranå / Wranå) 🔨	1	0	2	0	4	0	3	3	13

Draw 8
Saturday, 7 February, 14:35

Sheet C	1	2	3	4	5	6	7	8	Final
Sweden (Wranå / Wranå)	0	2	1	0	3	0	3	X	9
Italy (Constantini / Mosaner) 🔨	1	0	0	1	0	2	0	X	4

Draw 11
Sunday, 8 February, 14:35

Sheet A	1	2	3	4	5	6	7	8	Final
Canada (Peterman / Gallant) 🔨	0	2	0	1	0	2	0	1	6
Sweden (Wranå / Wranå)	2	0	1	0	1	0	3	0	7

Draw 12
Sunday, 8 February, 19:05

Sheet B	1	2	3	4	5	6	7	8	Final
Sweden (Wranå / Wranå) 🔨	3	0	1	0	0	2	1	0	7
United States (Thiesse / Dropkin)	0	3	0	3	1	0	0	1	8

Semifinal

Monday, 9 February, 18:05

Sheet B	1	2	3	4	5	6	7	8	Final
Great Britain (Dodds / Mouat) 🔨	1	0	0	1	1	0	0	X	3
Sweden (Wranå / Wranå)	0	2	1	0	0	5	1	X	9

Gold medal game

Tuesday, 10 February, 18:05

Sheet C	1	2	3	4	5	6	7	8	Final
Sweden (Wranå / Wranå)	0	2	0	1	0	1	0	2	6
United States (Thiesse / Dropkin) 🔨	1	0	1	0	1	0	2	0	5

== Figure skating ==
In the 2025 World Figure Skating Championships in Boston, the United States, Sweden secured one quota in the men's singles. Sweden earned one quota in ice dance competition at the ISU Skate to Milano Figure Skating Qualifier 2025 in Beijing, China, after reallocation of rejected quotas. Andreas Nordebäck was selected for men's singles while Nikolaj Majorov and Milla Ruud Reitan were selected for ice dance.

Athlete	Event	SP/SD		FP/FD		Total	
Athlete	Event	Points	Rank	Points	Rank	Points	Rank
Andreas Nordebäck	Men's singles	67.15	27	Did not advance		67.15	27
Nikolaj Majorov; Milla Ruud Reitan	Ice dance	67.31	19 Q	97.74	20	165.05	20

== Freestyle skiing ==
SOC has selected Walter Wallberg and Rasmus Stegfeldt in men's moguls, Elis Lundholm in women's moguls, brothers David Mobärg and Erik Mobärg in men's skicross, Linnea Mobärg and Sandra Näslund in women's skicross and Henrik Harlaut, Martin Nordqvist and Jesper Tjäder in men's slopestyle/big air.

Freeski

Athlete	Event	Qualification					Final				
Athlete	Event	Run 1	Run 2	Run 3	Best/Total	Rank	Run 1	Run 2	Run 3	Best/Total	Rank
Henrik Harlaut	Men's slopestyle	Did not start									
Martin Nordqvist	Men's big air	90.00	80.75	83.50	173.50	11 Q	16.75	19.25	38.75	58.00	12
Martin Nordqvist	Men's slopestyle	46.00	35.71	—N/a	46.00	19	Did not advance				19
Jesper Tjäder	Men's big air	60.75	55.75	DNI	116.50	23	Did not advance				23
Jesper Tjäder	Men's slopestyle	36.43	79.83	—N/a	79.83	3 Q	77.21	11.58	1.91	77.21	5

Moguls

Athlete	Event	Qualification								Final							
Athlete	Event	Run 1				Run 2				Run 1				Run 2			
Athlete	Event	Time	Points	Total	Rank	Time	Points	Total	Rank	Time	Points	Total	Rank	Time	Points	Total	Rank
Rasmus Stegfeldt	Men's moguls	23.13	16.87	73.23	17	22.69	17.46	77.37	6 Q	22.05	18.32	60.19	18	Did not advance			18
Walter Wallberg	Men's moguls	22.69	17.46	77.37	6 Q	Bye				22.14	18.20	81.35	4 Q	22.18	18.15	82.40	4
Elis Lundholm	Women's moguls	38.27	3.00	12.05	29	27.77	15.35	59.22	15	Did not advance							25

Dual moguls

Athlete	Event	Round of 32	Round of 16	Quarterfinal	Semifinal	Final	
Athlete	Event	Opposition Result	Opposition Result	Opposition Result	Opposition Result	Opposition Result	Rank
Rasmus Stegfeldt	Men's dual moguls	Vierela (FIN); W 22–13	Graham (AUS); L 8–27	Did not advance			12
Walter Wallberg	Men's dual moguls	Ahvenainen (FIN); W 26–9	Harvey (AUS); W 27–8	Shimakawa (JPN); L 16–19	Did not advance		5
Elis Lundholm	Women's dual moguls	Tomitaka (JPN); L 6–29	Did not advance				25

Filip Gravenfors and Robin Olgård were initially selected for men's moguls and men's dual moguls, but were deselected due to injury.

Ski cross

Athlete	Event	Seeding		Round of 16	Quarterfinal	Semifinal	Final	
Athlete	Event	Time	Rank	Position	Position	Position	Position	Rank
David Mobärg	Men's ski cross	1:07.56	10	3	Did not advance			18
Erik Mobärg	Men's ski cross	1:08.19	22	3	Did not advance			23
Linnea Mobärg	Women's ski cross	1:13.39	9	2 Q	3	Did not advance		10
Sandra Näslund	Women's ski cross	1:11.33	2	1 Q	1 Q	1 Q	3	3rd place, bronze medalist(s)

== Ice hockey ==
Summary

Key:

- OT – Overtime
- GWS – Match decided by penalty-shootout

Team	Event	Group stage					Qualification playoff	Quarterfinal	Semifinal	Final / BM	
Team	Event	Opposition Score	Opposition Score	Opposition Score	Opposition Score	Rank	Opposition Score	Opposition Score	Opposition Score	Opposition Score	Rank
Sweden men's	Men's tournament	Italy; W 5–2	Finland; L 1–4	Slovakia; W 5–3	—N/a	3 Q	Latvia; W 5–1	United States; L 1–2 OT	Did not advance		7
Sweden women's	Women's tournament	Germany; W 4–1	Italy; W 6–1	France; W 4–0	Japan; W 4–0	1 Q	—N/a	Czech Republic; W 2–0	United States; L 0–5	Switzerland; L 1–2 OT	4

=== Men's tournament ===
Sweden men's national ice hockey team qualified a team of 25 players by finishing 6th in the 2023 IIHF World Ranking.

Roster

The first six players of Sweden's roster were announced on 16 June 2025. The remainder of the roster was named on 2 January 2026. On 27 January, Marcus Johansson and Hampus Lindholm were announced as injury replacements for Leo Carlsson and Jonas Brodin, respectively. On 8 February, Gabriel Landeskog was named Sweden's captain, with Victor Hedman and Erik Karlsson serving as alternate captains.

Head coach: Sam Hallam

No.	Pos.	Name	Height	Weight	Birthdate	Team
3	D	Oliver Ekman-Larsson	1.88 m (6 ft 2 in)	92 kg (203 lb)	17 July 1991 (aged 34)	(Canada) Toronto Maple Leafs
4	D	Rasmus Andersson	1.85 m (6 ft 1 in)	92 kg (203 lb)	27 October 1996 (aged 29)	(United States) Vegas Golden Knights
6	D	Philip Broberg	1.91 m (6 ft 3 in)	92 kg (203 lb)	25 June 2001 (aged 24)	(United States) St. Louis Blues
9	F	Filip Forsberg	1.85 m (6 ft 1 in)	93 kg (205 lb)	13 August 1994 (aged 31)	(United States) Nashville Predators
10	F	Alexander Wennberg	1.88 m (6 ft 2 in)	85 kg (187 lb)	22 September 1994 (aged 31)	(United States) San Jose Sharks
14	F	Joel Eriksson Ek	1.91 m (6 ft 3 in)	95 kg (209 lb)	29 January 1997 (aged 29)	(United States) Minnesota Wild
19	F	Adrian Kempe	1.91 m (6 ft 3 in)	90 kg (198 lb)	13 September 1996 (aged 29)	(United States) Los Angeles Kings
23	F	Lucas Raymond	1.83 m (6 ft 0 in)	85 kg (187 lb)	28 March 2002 (aged 23)	(United States) Detroit Red Wings
25	G	Jacob Markström	1.96 m (6 ft 5 in)	93 kg (205 lb)	31 January 1990 (aged 36)	(United States) New Jersey Devils
26	D	Rasmus Dahlin	1.91 m (6 ft 3 in)	94 kg (207 lb)	13 April 2000 (aged 25)	(United States) Buffalo Sabres
27	D	Hampus Lindholm	1.93 m (6 ft 4 in)	100 kg (220 lb)	20 January 1994 (aged 32)	(United States) Boston Bruins
28	F	Elias Lindholm	1.83 m (6 ft 0 in)	92 kg (203 lb)	2 December 1994 (aged 31)	(United States) Boston Bruins
29	F	Pontus Holmberg	1.83 m (6 ft 0 in)	89 kg (196 lb)	9 March 1999 (aged 26)	(United States) Tampa Bay Lightning
30	G	Jesper Wallstedt	1.91 m (6 ft 3 in)	97 kg (214 lb)	14 November 2002 (aged 23)	(United States) Minnesota Wild
32	G	Filip Gustavsson	1.88 m (6 ft 2 in)	90 kg (198 lb)	7 June 1998 (aged 27)	(United States) Minnesota Wild
40	F	Elias Pettersson	1.88 m (6 ft 2 in)	80 kg (176 lb)	12 November 1998 (aged 27)	(Canada) Vancouver Canucks
42	D	Gustav Forsling	1.83 m (6 ft 0 in)	90 kg (198 lb)	12 June 1996 (aged 29)	(United States) Florida Panthers
63	F	Jesper Bratt	1.78 m (5 ft 10 in)	81 kg (179 lb)	30 July 1998 (aged 27)	(United States) New Jersey Devils
65	D	Erik Karlsson – A	1.80 m (5 ft 11 in)	79 kg (174 lb)	31 May 1990 (aged 35)	(United States) Pittsburgh Penguins
67	F	Rickard Rakell	1.85 m (6 ft 1 in)	92 kg (203 lb)	5 March 1993 (aged 32)	(United States) Pittsburgh Penguins
77	D	Victor Hedman – A	1.98 m (6 ft 6 in)	110 kg (243 lb)	18 December 1990 (aged 35)	(United States) Tampa Bay Lightning
88	F	William Nylander	1.83 m (6 ft 0 in)	86 kg (190 lb)	1 May 1996 (aged 29)	(Canada) Toronto Maple Leafs
90	F	Marcus Johansson	1.85 m (6 ft 1 in)	95 kg (209 lb)	6 October 1990 (aged 35)	(United States) Minnesota Wild
92	F	Gabriel Landeskog – C	1.85 m (6 ft 1 in)	92 kg (203 lb)	23 November 1992 (aged 33)	(United States) Colorado Avalanche
93	F	Mika Zibanejad	1.88 m (6 ft 2 in)	92 kg (203 lb)	18 April 1993 (aged 32)	(United States) New York Rangers

Group play

Pos	Team	Pld	W	OTW	OTL	L	GF	GA	GD	Pts	Qualification
1	Slovakia	3	2	0	0	1	10	8	+2	6 (Note: Head-to-head points: 3 each. Head-to-head goal difference: Slovakia +1; Finland 0; Sweden −1.)	Advance to quarterfinals
2	Finland	3	2	0	0	1	16	5	+11	6	Advance to quarterfinals
3	Sweden	3	2	0	0	1	11	9	+2	6	Advance to qualification playoffs
4	Italy (H)	3	0	0	0	3	4	19	−15	0	Advance to qualification playoffs

Source: IIHF
Rules for classification: Tiebreak criteria
(H) Host
Notes:

11 February 2026; 21:10	Sweden	5–2 (2–1, 1–1, 2–0)	Italy	PalaItalia, Milan; Attendance: 11,251

Game reference

Filip Gustavsson
Goalies
Damian Clara
Davide Fadani
Referees:
(Czech Republic) Jan Hribik
(Canada) Dan O'Rourke
Linesmen:
(Canada) David Brisebois
(Finland) Onni Hautamäki

	0–1	04:14 – Frigo
Landeskog (Zibanejad, Karlsson) (PP)– 09:06	1–1
Forsling (Raymond, Bratt) – 17:53	2–1
	2–2	20:37 – Bradley (Gazley, Larkin)
Nylander (Dahlin, Kempe) – 36:46	3–2
Zibanejad (Dahlin, Rakell) – 55:42	4–2
Hedman (Forsling) (EN) – 57:11	5–2

2 min
Penalties
2 min
60
Shots
22

13 February 2026; 12:10	Finland	4–1 (2–0, 1–1, 1–0)	Sweden	PalaItalia, Milan; Attendance: 11,336

Game reference

Juuse Saros
Goalies
Filip Gustavsson
Referees:
(Canada) Gord Dwyer
(United States) Chris Rooney
Linesmen:
(Canada) Scott Cherrey
(United States) Jake Davis

Matinpalo (Kakko, Määttä) – 07:44	1–0
Lundell (Luostarinen, Mikkola) – 15:29	2–0
	2–1	24:39 – Dahlin (Nylander, Raymond)
Armia (Haula, Lindell) (SH) – 32:47	3–1
Rantanen (Granlund, Hintz) (EN) – 59:25	4–1

18 min
Penalties
14 min
24
Shots
35

14 February 2026; 12:10	Sweden	5–3 (1–1, 2–1, 2–1)	Slovakia	PalaItalia, Milan; Attendance: 11,332

Game reference

Jacob Markström
Goalies
Samuel Hlavaj
Referees:
(Latvia) Andris Ansons
(United States) Kyle Rehman
Linesmen:
(Czech Republic) Daniel Hynek
(Czech Republic) Libor Suchánek

Eriksson Ek (Kempe) (SH) – 07:17	1–0
	1–1	08:59 – Slafkovský (Nemec, Gernát)
Kempe (Dahlin, Raymond) (PP) – 27:06	2–1
	2–2	29:48 – Gernát (Čerešňák, Ružička)
Pettersson (Forsberg, Hedman) – 34:29	3–2
Pettersson (Raymond, Karlsson) – 47:57	4–2
Raymond (Zibanejad, Karlsson) – 51:38	5–2
	5–3	59:21 – Dvorský (Slafkovský, Čerešňák) (PP)

14 min
Penalties
14 min
51
Shots
32

Qualification play-offs

17 February 2026; 21:10	Sweden	5–1 (2–0, 1–1, 2–0)	Latvia	PalaItalia, Milan; Attendance: 11,088

Game reference

Jacob Markström
Goalies
Elvis Merzļikins
Referees:
(Canada) Gord Dwyer
(United States) Sean MacFarlane
Linesmen:
(Czech Republic) Daniel Hynek
(United States) Jonny Murray

Kempe (Eriksson Ek, Nylander) – 10:55	1–0
Landeskog (Raymond, Zibanejad) – 11:36	2–0
Forsberg (Karlsson, Broberg) – 27:36	3–0
	3–1	30:47 – Tralmaks (Smits, Bļugers)
Zibanejad (Raymond, Landeskog) – 45:54	4–1
Nylander (Raymond, Dahlin) – 53:18	5–1

6 min
Penalties
4 min
28
Shots
21

Quarterfinal

18 February 2026; 21:10	United States	2–1 OT (0–0, 1–0, 0–1) (OT: 1–0)	Sweden	PalaItalia, Milan; Attendance: 11,097

Game reference

Connor Hellebuyck
Goalies
Jacob Markström
Referees:
(Canada) Eric Furlatt
(Canada) Wes McCauley
Linesmen:
(Canada) Scott Cherrey
(Finland) Onni Hautamäki

Larkin (J. Hughes, Q. Hughes) – 31:03	1–0
	1–1	58:29 – Zibanejad (Raymond, Landeskog) (EA)
Q. Hughes (Boldy, Matthews) – 63:27	2–1

2 min
Penalties
4 min
40
Shots
29

=== Women's tournament ===
Sweden women's national ice hockey team qualified a team of 23 players by winning a final qualification tournament.

Roster

The roster was announced on 12 January 2026.

Head coach: Ulf Lundberg

No.	Pos.	Name	Height	Weight	Birthdate	Team
1	G	Ebba Svensson Träff	1.65 m (5 ft 5 in)	69 kg (152 lb)	27 November 2005 (aged 20)	(Sweden) Linköping HC
4	D	Linnéa Andersson	1.71 m (5 ft 7 in)	64 kg (141 lb)	30 September 1998 (aged 27)	(Sweden) MoDo Hockey
7	D	Mira Jungåker	1.72 m (5 ft 8 in)	70 kg (150 lb)	22 July 2005 (aged 20)	(United States) Ohio State Buckeyes
8	F	Hilda Svensson	1.70 m (5 ft 7 in)	67 kg (148 lb)	24 August 2006 (aged 19)	(United States) Ohio State Buckeyes
9	D	Jessica Adolfsson	1.76 m (5 ft 9 in)	82 kg (181 lb)	15 July 1998 (aged 27)	(Sweden) SDE HF
11	F	Josefin Bouveng	1.75 m (5 ft 9 in)	72 kg (159 lb)	15 May 2001 (aged 24)	(United States) Minnesota Golden Gophers
12	D	Maja Nylén Persson	1.62 m (5 ft 4 in)	66 kg (146 lb)	20 November 2000 (aged 25)	(United States) New York Sirens
14	D	Ida Karlsson	1.75 m (5 ft 9 in)	68 kg (150 lb)	30 June 2004 (aged 21)	(United States) Minnesota Duluth Bulldogs
15	F	Lisa Johansson	1.61 m (5 ft 3 in)	59 kg (130 lb)	11 April 1992 (aged 33)	(Sweden) SDE HF
17	F	Sofie Lundin	1.64 m (5 ft 5 in)	63 kg (139 lb)	15 February 2000 (aged 25)	(Sweden) Frölunda HC
19	F	Sara Hjalmarsson – A	1.76 m (5 ft 9 in)	79 kg (174 lb)	8 February 1998 (aged 27)	(Canada) Toronto Sceptres
22	F	Hanna Thuvik	1.70 m (5 ft 7 in)	75 kg (165 lb)	17 May 2002 (aged 23)	(Sweden) Brynäs IF
23	F	Thea Johansson	1.71 m (5 ft 7 in)	67 kg (148 lb)	22 November 2002 (aged 23)	(United States) Minnesota Duluth Bulldogs
24	F	Ebba Hedqvist	1.68 m (5 ft 6 in)	67 kg (148 lb)	30 September 2006 (aged 19)	(Sweden) MoDo Hockey
25	F	Lina Ljungblom	1.67 m (5 ft 6 in)	77 kg (170 lb)	15 October 2001 (aged 24)	(Canada) Montreal Victoire
26	F	Hanna Olsson – A	1.73 m (5 ft 8 in)	69 kg (152 lb)	20 January 1999 (aged 27)	(Sweden) Frölunda HC
29	F	Felizia Wikner Zienkiewicz	1.70 m (5 ft 7 in)	65 kg (143 lb)	17 September 1999 (aged 26)	(Sweden) Frölunda HC
30	G	Emma Söderberg	1.71 m (5 ft 7 in)	69 kg (152 lb)	18 February 1998 (aged 27)	(Sweden) SDE HF
34	F	Mira Hallin	1.67 m (5 ft 6 in)	65 kg (143 lb)	24 April 2006 (aged 19)	(Sweden) MoDo Hockey
35	G	Tindra Holm	1.72 m (5 ft 8 in)	69 kg (152 lb)	26 May 2001 (aged 24)	(Sweden) MoDo Hockey
55	D	Jenna Raunio	1.74 m (5 ft 9 in)	70 kg (150 lb)	25 September 2006 (aged 19)	(United States) Ohio State Buckeyes
71	D	Anna Kjellbin – C	1.69 m (5 ft 7 in)	63 kg (139 lb)	16 March 1994 (aged 31)	(Canada) Toronto Sceptres
89	F	Nicole Hall	1.66 m (5 ft 5 in)	74 kg (163 lb)	24 March 2004 (aged 21)	(United States) Penn State Nittany Lions

Group play

Pos	Team	Pld	W	OTW	OTL	L	GF	GA	GD	Pts	Qualification
1	Sweden	4	4	0	0	0	18	2	+16	12	Quarter-finals
2	Germany	4	2	1	0	1	10	8	+2	8	Quarter-finals
3	Italy (H)	4	2	0	0	2	9	11	−2	6	Quarter-finals
4	Japan	4	1	0	0	3	7	14	−7	3	Eliminated
5	France	4	0	0	1	3	4	13	−9	1	Eliminated

Source: IIHF
Rules for classification: Tiebreakers
(H) Host

5 February 2026; 12:10 v	Sweden	4–1 (1–1, 2–0, 1–0)	Germany	Fiera Milano, Milan; Attendance: 2,455

Game reference

Ebba Svensson Träff
Goalies
Sandra Abstreiter
Referees:
(Canada) Shauna Neary
(Finland) Anniina Nurmi
Linesmen:
(United States) Sarah Buckner
(Finland) Tiina Saarimäki

	0–1	08:30 – Jobst-Smith (Lu. Welcke, Strobel) (PP)
Ljungblom (Wikner, Raunio) – 11:53	1–1
Ljungblom (L. Johansson, Lundin) (PP) – 27:03	2–1
Jungåker (L. Johansson, Raunio) (PP) – 39:20	3–1
T. Johansson (Svensson, Olsson) – 51:20	4–1

2 min
Penalties
8 min
37
Shots
16

7 February 2026; 14:40 v	Sweden	6–1 (1–0, 3–1, 2–0)	Italy	PalaItalia, Milan; Attendance: 10,727

Game reference

Ebba Svensson Träff
Goalies
Martina Fedel
Gabriella Durante
Referees:
(United States) Melissa Doyle
(Canada) Shauna Neary
Linesmen:
(Canada) Alexandra Clarke
(Czech Republic) Kristýna Hájková

Adolfsson (Thuvik, Hjalmarsson) – 09:50	1–0
Lundin (Raunio, Kjellbin) – 29:36	2–0
Hjalmarsson (Karlsson) – 31:47	3–0
	3–1	33:30 – Stocker
Olsson (Andersson, T. Johansson) – 34:39	4–1
T. Johansson (Ljungblom) – 46:53	5–1
T. Johansson (Olsson, Svensson) – 54:32	6–1

2 min
Penalties
4 min
47
Shots
19

8 February 2026; 16:40 v	France	0–4 (0–3, 0–1, 0–0)	Sweden	Fiera Milano, Milan; Attendance: 3,868

Game reference

Alice Philbert
Goalies
Emma Söderberg
Referees:
(Finland) Anniina Nurmi
(Czech Republic) Zuzana Svobodová
Linesmen:
(United States) Jennifer Cameron
(Sweden) Jessica Lundgren

0–1	03:30 – T. Johansson (Svensson, Olsson)
0–2	07:08 – Hjalmarsson (Olsson, Svensson) (PP)
0–3	13:14 – Thuvik (L. Johansson)
0–4	20:45 – L. Johansson (Thuvik, Hjalmarsson)

10 min
Penalties
6 min
14
Shots
49

10 February 2026; 12:10 v	Japan	0–4 (0–1, 0–2, 0–1)	Sweden	Fiera Milano, Milan; Attendance: 3,100

Game reference

Riko Kawaguchi
Rei Halloran
Goalies
Ebba Svensson Träff
Referees:
(United States) Kelly Cooke
(Canada) Michelle McKenna
Linesmen:
(Canada) Alexandra Clarke
(Finland) Tiina Saarimäki

0–1	05:25 – Thuvik (Hjalmarsson)
0–2	25:36 – Bouveng (Raunio)
0–3	37:30 – Hallin (Bouveng, Persson)
0–4	41:06 – Olsson (Persson, T. Johansson) (PP)

8 min
Penalties
6 min
20
Shots
31

Quarterfinal

13 February 2026; 16:40 v	Czechia	0–2 (0–0, 0–1, 0–1)	Sweden	Fiera Milano, Milan; Attendance: 3,360

Game reference
Klára Peslarová	Goalies	Ebba Svensson Träff	Referees: (Canada) Michelle McKenna (United States) Amanda Tassoni; Linesmen: (United States) Sarah Buckner (Canada) Justine Todd
0–1 / 24:47 – Olsson (Svensson, Persson) (PP); 0–2 / 59:35 – Svensson (Kjellbin) (EN)			Referees: (Canada) Michelle McKenna (United States) Amanda Tassoni; Linesmen: (United States) Sarah Buckner (Canada) Justine Todd
8 min	Penalties	10 min	Referees: (Canada) Michelle McKenna (United States) Amanda Tassoni; Linesmen: (United States) Sarah Buckner (Canada) Justine Todd
29	Shots	23	Referees: (Canada) Michelle McKenna (United States) Amanda Tassoni; Linesmen: (United States) Sarah Buckner (Canada) Justine Todd

Semifinal

16 February 2026; 16:40 v	United States	5–0 (1–0, 4–0, 0–0)	Sweden	PalaItalia, Milan; Attendance: 7,894

Game reference

Aerin Frankel
Goalies
Ebba Svensson Träff
Emma Söderberg
Referees:
(Canada) Cianna Murray
(United States) Amanda Tassoni
Linesmen:
(Finland) Tiina Saarimäki
(Canada) Erin Zach

Barnes (Pannek, Stecklein) (EA) – 05:09	1–0
Heise (Bilka, Murphy) – 29:09	2–0
Murphy (Bilka, Winn) – 35:12	3–0
Coyne (Edwards, Keller) – 36:10	4–0
Scamurra (Curl-Salemme, Janecke) – 37:59	5–0

8 min
Penalties
6 min
34
Shots
23

Bronze medal game

19 February 2026; 14:40 v	Switzerland	2–1 OT (0–0, 1–1, 0–0) (OT: 1–0)	Sweden	PalaItalia, Milan; Attendance: 8,243

Game reference

Andrea Brändli
Goalies
Ebba Svensson Träff
Referees:
(Canada) Élizabeth Mantha
(Finland) Anniina Nurmi
Linesmen:
(Canada) Alexandra Clarke
(Canada) Justine Todd

	0–1	31:40 – Jungåker (Svensson, T. Johansson)
Leemann (Marti) – 35:40	1–1
Müller (Wey, Christen) – 69:09	2–1

2 min
Penalties
4 min
25
Shots
33

== Luge ==
Sweden qualified one woman and one man in luge. SOC selected siblings Svante Kohala and Tove Kohala.

Athlete	Event	Run 1		Run 2		Run 3		Run 4		Total	
Athlete	Event	Time	Rank	Time	Rank	Time	Rank	Time	Rank	Time	Rank
Svante Kohala	Men's singles	53.752	14	53.875	17	53.584	13 Q	53.676	14	3:34.887	13
Tove Kohala	Women's singles	54.425	22	53.615	17	53.740	17 Q	53.708	18	3:35.488	19

== Ski jumping ==
Sweden qualified one female ski jumper. SOC selected Frida Westman.

Women

Athlete	Event	First round			Final			Total	
Athlete	Event	Distance	Points	Rank	Distance	Points	Rank	Points	Rank
Frida Westman	Normal hill	87.0	94.8	42	Did not advance			94.8	42
Frida Westman	Large hill	129.5	126.0	6	127.5	139.4	5	265.4	4

== See also ==
- Sweden at the 2026 Winter Paralympics
