= Japan at the 2026 Winter Olympics =

- Flag of Japan
- IOC code: JPN
- NOC: Japanese Olympic Committee
- Website: www.joc.or.jp

in Milan and Cortina d'Ampezzo, Italy 6 February 2026 – 22 February 2026
- Competitors: 121 (47 men and 74 women) in 13 sports
- Flag bearers (opening): Wataru Morishige & Sena Tomita
- Flag bearers (closing): Wataru Morishige & Kaori Sakamoto
- Medals Ranked 10th: Gold 5 Silver 7 Bronze 12 Total 24

Winter Olympics appearances (overview)
- 1928; 1932; 1936; 1948; 1952; 1956; 1960; 1964; 1968; 1972; 1976; 1980; 1984; 1988; 1992; 1994; 1998; 2002; 2006; 2010; 2014; 2018; 2022; 2026

Japan participated in the 2026 Winter Olympics in Milan and Cortina d'Ampezzo, Italy, from February 6 to 22, 2026.

Officially called the XXV Winter Olympic Games, and commonly known as Milano-Cortina 2026, the 2026 Winter Olympics (Italian: Olimpiadi invernali del 2026) was an international multi-sport event taking place at multiple sites across Lombardy and Northeast Italy, with competition in selected events beginning February 4, 2026.

It was Japan's 23rd appearance at the Winter Olympic Games. Speed skater Wataru Morishige and snowboarder Sena Tomita were the flag bearers of the national flag of Japan at the opening ceremony. Meanwhile, Wataru Morishige and Kaori Sakamoto were the country's flagbearer during the closing ceremony.

On February 17, with the bronze medal won by the Japanese women's speed skating team pursuit consisted of Miho Takagi, Ayano Sato, Hana Noake, and Momoka Horikawa, Japan collected its 19th medal of the games, surpassing its previous best record of 18 medals at a single Winter Olympics.

== Medalists ==
Shown in these charts are the Japanese athletes who won medals at the 2026 Winter Olympic games.

Medal	Name	Sport	Event	Date
Gold	Kira Kimura	Snowboarding	Men's big air	7 February
Gold	Kokomo Murase	Snowboarding	Women's big air	9 February
Gold	Yuto Totsuka	Snowboarding	Men's halfpipe	13 February
Gold	Riku Miura; Ryuichi Kihara	Figure skating	Pair skating	16 February
Gold	Mari Fukada	Snowboarding	Women's slopestyle	18 February
Silver	Ryoma Kimata	Snowboarding	Men's big air	7 February
Silver	Yuma Kagiyama; Shun Sato; Kaori Sakamoto; Riku Miura; Ryuichi Kihara; Utana Yoshida; Masaya Morita	Figure skating	Team event	8 February
Silver	Yuma Kagiyama	Figure skating	Mens singles	13 February
Silver	Ren Nikaidō	Ski jumping	Mens individual large hill	14 February
Silver	Ikuma Horishima	Freestyle skiing	Men's dual moguls	15 February
Silver	Taiga Hasegawa	Snowboarding	Men's slopestyle	18 February
Silver	Kaori Sakamoto	Figure skating	Women's singles	19 February
Bronze	Nozomi Maruyama	Ski jumping	Women's normal hill individual	7 February
Bronze	Miho Takagi	Speed skating	Women's 1000 m	9 February
Bronze	Ren Nikaidō	Ski jumping	Men's normal hill individual	9 February
Bronze	Nozomi Maruyama; Ryōyū Kobayashi; Sara Takanashi; Ren Nikaidō	Ski jumping	Mixed team	10 February
Bronze	Ikuma Horishima	Freestyle skiing	Men's moguls	12 February
Bronze	Mitsuki Ono	Snowboarding	Women's halfpipe	12 February
Bronze	Ryusei Yamada	Snowboarding	Men's halfpipe	13 February
Bronze	Shun Sato	Figure skating	Mens singles	13 February
Bronze	Miho Takagi	Speed skating	Women's 500 metres	15 February
Bronze	Momoka Horikawa; Hana Noake; Ayano Sato; Miho Takagi	Speed skating	Women's team pursuit	17 February
Bronze	Kokomo Murase	Snowboarding	Women's slopestyle	18 February
Bronze	Ami Nakai	Figure skating	Women's singles	19 February

Medals by date
Day	Date	1st place, gold medalist(s)	2nd place, silver medalist(s)	3rd place, bronze medalist(s)	Total
1	7 February	1	1	1	3
2	8 February	0	1	0	1
3	9 February	1	0	2	3
4	10 February	0	0	1	1
6	12 February	0	0	2	2
7	13 February	1	1	2	4
8	14 February	0	1	0	1
9	15 February	0	1	1	2
10	16 February	1	0	0	1
11	17 February	0	0	1	1
12	18 February	1	1	1	3
13	19 February	0	1	1	2
Total		5	7	12	24

Medals by sport
Sport	1st place, gold medalist(s)	2nd place, silver medalist(s)	3rd place, bronze medalist(s)	Total
Snowboarding	4	2	3	9
Figure skating	1	3	2	6
Ski jumping	0	1	3	4
Freestyle skiing	0	1	1	2
Speed skating	0	0	3	3
Total	5	7	12	24

Medals by gender
Gender	1st place, gold medalist(s)	2nd place, silver medalist(s)	3rd place, bronze medalist(s)	Total
Male	2	5	4	11
Female	2	1	7	10
Mixed	1	1	1	3
Total	5	7	12	24

Multiple medalists
Name	Sport	1st place, gold medalist(s)	2nd place, silver medalist(s)	3rd place, bronze medalist(s)	Total
Riku Miura	Figure skating	1	1	0	2
Ryuichi Kihara	Figure skating	1	1	0	2
Kokomo Murase	Snowboarding	1	0	1	2
Yuma Kagiyama	Figure skating	0	2	0	2
Kaori Sakamoto	Figure skating	0	2	0	2
Ren Nikaidō	Ski jumping	0	1	2	3
Shun Sato	Figure skating	0	1	1	2
Miho Takagi	Speed skating	0	0	3	3
Nozomi Maruyama	Ski jumping	0	0	2	2

== Competitors ==
The following is the list of number of competitors participating at the Games per sport/discipline.

Sport	Men	Women	Total
Alpine skiing	1	1	2
Cross-country skiing	3	1	4
Curling	0	5	5
Figure skating	6	6	12
Freestyle skiing	9	11	20
Ice hockey	0	23	23
Luge	1	0	1
Nordic combined	3	0	3
Short-track speed skating	4	5	9
Skeleton	1	0	1
Ski jumping	3	4	7
Snowboarding	9	11	20
Speed skating	7	7	14
Total	47	74	121

== Alpine skiing ==
Japan qualified one female and one male alpine skier through the basic quota.

Athlete	Event	Run 1		Run 2		Total	
Athlete	Event	Time	Rank	Time	Rank	Time	Rank
Shiro Aihara	Men's slalom	1:00.83	22	58.75	20	1:59.58	20
Asa Ando	Women's slalom	DNF					

== Cross-country skiing ==
Japan qualified one female and one male cross-country skier through the basic quota. Following the completion of the 2024–25 FIS Cross-Country World Cup, Japan qualified a further three female and two male athletes. However, Japan declined the three additional female quotas.

Distance

Athlete	Event	Classical		Freestyle		Final		
Athlete	Event	Time	Rank	Time	Rank	Time	Deficit	Rank
Naoto Baba	Men's 10 km freestyle	—N/a		22:21.5	35	—N/a		
Naoto Baba	Men's 20 km skiathlon	24:52.8	36	23:45.3	29	49:09.9	+2:58.9	34
Naoto Baba	Men's 50 km classical	2:20:02.0	26	—N/a				
Ryo Hirose	Men's 10 km freestyle	—N/a		22:18.9	33	—N/a		
Ryo Hirose	Men's 20 km skiathlon	24:06.0	15	23:41.4	28	48:14.8	+2:03.8	22
Ryo Hirose	Men's 50 km classical	2:22:41.2	32	—N/a				
Daito Yamazaki	Men's 10 km freestyle	—N/a		22:14.6	30	—N/a		
Daito Yamazaki	Men's 20 km skiathlon	25:50.6	49	24:11.0	36	50:30.9	+4:19.9	44
Masae Tsuchiya	Women's 10 km freestyle	—N/a		25:00.4	26	—N/a		
Masae Tsuchiya	Women's 20 km skiathlon	30:05.6	40	29:13.8	35	59:50.4	+6:05.2	35
Masae Tsuchiya	Women's 50 km classical	2:34:23.9	23	—N/a				

== Curling ==
Summary

Team	Event	Group stage										Semifinal	Final / BM	
Team	Event	Opposition Score	Opposition Score	Opposition Score	Opposition Score	Opposition Score	Opposition Score	Opposition Score	Opposition Score	Opposition Score	Rank	Opposition Score	Opposition Score	Rank
Sayaka Yoshimura; Kaho Onodera; Yuna Kotani; Anna Ohmiya; Mina Kobayashi	Women's tournament	SWE; L 4–8	DEN; L 7–10	SUI; W 7–5	USA; L 4–7	KOR; L 5–7	CAN; L 6–9	ITA; L 6–8	GBR; L 3–9	CHN; W 9–6	8	Did not advance		

=== Women's tournament ===
Japan qualified a women's team by winning the Olympic Qualification Event. Team Sayaka Yoshimura qualified as Japanese representatives by winning the 2025 Japanese Olympic Curling Trials, defeating Team Miyu Ueno 3–2 in the best-of-five series.

Final Round Robin Standings
Team	Skip	Pld	W	L	W–L	PF	PA	EW	EL	BE	SE	S%	DSC	Qualification
Sweden	Anna Hasselborg	9	7	2	–	65	50	45	32	5	14	81.7%	25.806	Playoffs
United States	Tabitha Peterson	9	6	3	2–0	60	54	40	37	3	13	82.1%	34.288	Playoffs
Switzerland	Silvana Tirinzoni	9	6	3	1–1	60	51	35	42	6	4	85.0%	44.338	Playoffs
Canada	Rachel Homan	9	6	3	0–2	76	59	45	38	2	9	80.3%	19.781	Playoffs
South Korea	Gim Eun-ji	9	5	4	1–0	60	53	37	35	8	11	81.2%	23.581	
Great Britain	Sophie Jackson	9	5	4	0–1	58	58	36	36	10	8	83.4%	16.938	
Denmark	Madeleine Dupont	9	4	5	–	49	58	36	38	3	11	77.0%	37.875	
Japan	Sayaka Yoshimura	9	2	7	1–1	51	69	35	43	3	6	78.6%	27.513	
Italy	Stefania Constantini	9	2	7	1–1	47	60	34	40	3	4	78.8%	34.719	
China	Wang Rui	9	2	7	1–1	56	70	37	39	3	9	82.7%	41.206	

Source: Official website

Round robin
Japan had a bye in draws 3, 7 and 10.

Draw 1
Thursday, 12 February, 9:05

Sheet B	1	2	3	4	5	6	7	8	9	10	Final
Japan (Yoshimura)	0	0	1	0	0	2	0	1	0	X	4
Sweden (Hasselborg) 🔨	0	1	0	3	1	0	2	0	1	X	8

Draw 2
Thursday, 12 February, 19:05

Sheet C	1	2	3	4	5	6	7	8	9	10	11	Final
Denmark (Dupont) 🔨	0	2	1	1	0	2	0	0	1	0	3	10
Japan (Yoshimura)	1	0	0	0	2	0	2	1	0	1	0	7

Draw 4
Saturday, 14 February, 9:05

Sheet D	1	2	3	4	5	6	7	8	9	10	Final
Switzerland (Tirinzoni) 🔨	2	0	1	0	0	1	0	0	1	0	5
Japan (Yoshimura)	0	1	0	2	0	0	2	1	0	1	7

Draw 5
Saturday, 14 February, 19:05

Sheet B	1	2	3	4	5	6	7	8	9	10	Final
Japan (Yoshimura) 🔨	0	1	0	2	0	0	0	0	1	X	4
United States (Peterson)	0	0	2	0	1	1	0	3	0	X	7

Draw 6
Sunday, 15 February, 14:05

Sheet A	1	2	3	4	5	6	7	8	9	10	Final
Japan (Yoshimura) 🔨	0	0	0	2	0	1	0	0	2	0	5
South Korea (Gim)	0	1	1	0	1	0	0	3	0	1	7

Draw 8
Monday, 16 February, 19:05

Sheet D	1	2	3	4	5	6	7	8	9	10	Final
Japan (Yoshimura) 🔨	2	0	0	1	0	0	1	0	2	0	6
Canada (Homan)	0	2	3	0	1	1	0	1	0	1	9

Draw 9
Tuesday, 17 February, 14:05

Sheet B	1	2	3	4	5	6	7	8	9	10	Final
Italy (Constantini) 🔨	0	1	0	3	0	1	0	1	0	2	8
Japan (Yoshimura)	0	0	1	0	3	0	1	0	1	0	6

Draw 11
Wednesday, 18 February, 19:05

Sheet A	1	2	3	4	5	6	7	8	9	10	Final
Great Britain (Jackson) 🔨	0	3	1	0	2	0	2	1	X	X	9
Japan (Yoshimura)	0	0	0	1	0	2	0	0	X	X	3

Draw 12
Thursday, 19 February, 14:30

Sheet C	1	2	3	4	5	6	7	8	9	10	Final
Japan (Yoshimura)	0	0	2	2	0	1	0	1	1	2	9
China (Wang) 🔨	0	1	0	0	3	0	2	0	0	0	6

== Figure skating ==
In the 2025 World Figure Skating Championships in Boston, the United States, Japan secured three quota in men's singles, three quota in women's singles, and one quota in pair skating. Japan earned an additional quota in pairs at the ISU Skate to Milano Figure Skating Qualifier 2025 in Beijing, China. Furthermore, Japan qualified to the team event. As Japan had no ice dance quota, they were able to send a pair of ice dancers to compete specifically in the team event.

Athlete	Event	SP/SD		FP/FD		Total	
Athlete	Event	Points	Rank	Points	Rank	Points	Rank
Yuma Kagiyama	Men's singles	103.07	2 Q	176.99	6	280.06	2nd place, silver medalist(s)
Kao Miura	Men's singles	76.77	22 Q	170.11	10	246.88	13
Shun Sato	Men's singles	88.70	9 Q	186.20	3	274.90	3rd place, bronze medalist(s)
Mone Chiba	Women's singles	74.00	4 Q	143.88	8	217.88	4
Ami Nakai	Women's singles	78.71	1 Q	140.45	9	219.16	3rd place, bronze medalist(s)
Kaori Sakamoto	Women's singles	77.23	2 Q	147.67	2	224.90	2nd place, silver medalist(s)
Riku Miura; Ryuichi Kihara	Pairs	73.11	5 Q	158.13	1	231.24	1st place, gold medalist(s)
Yuna Nagaoka; Sumitada Moriguchi	Pairs	59.62	19	Did not advance			19

Team event

Athlete	Event	Short program / Rhythm dance						Free skate / Free dance				Total	
Athlete	Event	Men's	Women's	Pairs	Ice dance	Total		Men's	Women's	Pairs	Ice dance	Total	
Athlete	Event	Points Team points	Points Team points	Points Team points	Points Team points	Points	Rank	Points Team points	Points Team points	Points Team points	Points Team points	Points	Rank
Yuma Kagiyama (M) (SP); Shun Sato (M) (FS); Kaori Sakamoto (W); Riku Miura / Ryuichi Kihara (P); Utana Yoshida / Masaya Morita (ID)	Team event	108.67; 10	78.88; 10	82.84; 10	68.64; 3	33	2 Q	194.86; 9	148.62; 10	155.55; 10	98.55; 6	68	2nd place, silver medalist(s)

== Freestyle skiing ==
Aerials

Athlete	Event	Qualification				Final			
Athlete	Event	Jump 1		Jump 2		Jump 1		Jump 2	
Athlete	Event	Points	Rank	Points	Rank	Points	Rank	Points	Rank
Haruto Igarashi	Men's aerials	67.86	24	DNS		Did not advance			24
Runa Igarashi	Women's aerials	54.60	22	51.94	18	Did not advance			24

Moguls
Men

Athlete	Event	Qualification								Final							
Athlete	Event	Run 1				Run 2				Run 1				Run 2			Rank
Athlete	Event	Time	Points	Total	Rank	Time	Points	Total	Rank	Time	Points	Total	Rank	Time	Points	Total	Rank
Goshin Fujiki	Men's	23.65	16.17	73.68	14	23.29	16.65	65.44	13	Did not advance							23
Ikuma Horishima	Men's	22.63	17.54	85.42	1 Q	Bye				22.61	17.57	80.35	5 Q	22.23	18.08	83.44	3rd place, bronze medalist(s)
Taketo Nishizawa	Men's	23.80	15.97	70.41	22	23.77	16.01	73.95	12	Did not advance							22
Takuya Shimakawa	Men's	24.06	15.62	74.82	13	23.31	16.63	78.27	2 Q	23.22	16.75	76.54	15	Did not advance			15

Women

Athlete	Event	Qualification								Final							
Athlete	Event	Run 1				Run 2				Run 1				Run 2			Rank
Athlete	Event	Time	Points	Total	Rank	Time	Points	Total	Rank	Time	Points	Total	Rank	Time	Points	Total	Rank
Hina Fujiki	Women's	27.31	15.89	65.89	19	29.24	70.06	70.06	9 Q	26.98	16.28	73.24	11	Did not advance			11
Haruka Nakao	Women's	28.71	14.24	74.71	7 Q	Bye				29.03	13.87	70.89	17	Did not advance			17
Hinako Tomitaka	Women's	28.10	14.96	75.28	5 Q	Bye				26.90	16.37	79.42	3 Q	27.03	16.22	78.00	4
Rino Yanagimoto	Women's	28.01	15.07	68.49	16	28.16	73.35	73.35	4 Q	27.27	15.94	72.49	13	Did not advance			13

Dual moguls
Men

Athlete	Event	1/16 Final	1/8 Final	Quarterfinal	Semifinal	Final	
Athlete	Event	Opposition Result	Opposition Result	Opposition Result	Opposition Result	Opposition Result	Rank
Goshin Fujiki	Men's	Harvey (AUS); L 16–19	Did not advance				18
Ikuma Horishima	Men's	Bye	Page (USA); W 35-DNF	Walczyk (USA); W 26-9	Graham (AUS); W 21-14	Kingsbury (CAN); L 4–31	2nd place, silver medalist(s)
Taketo Nishizawa	Men's	Graham (AUS); L 13–22	Did not advance				22
Takuya Shimakawa	Men's	Vallaincourt (CAN); W 20–15	Viel (CAN); W 35–DNF	Wallberg (SWE); W 19–16	Kingsbury (CAN); L 2–33	Graham (AUS); L 15–20	4

Women

Athlete	Event	1/16 Final	1/8 Final	Quarterfinal	Semifinal	Final	
Athlete	Event	Opposition Result	Opposition Result	Opposition Result	Opposition Result	Opposition Result	Rank
Hina Fujiki	Women's	Nakao (JPN); W 19–16	Johnson (USA); L 15–20	Did not advance			9
Haruka Nakao	Women's	Fujiki (JPN); L 16–19	Did not advance				18
Hinako Tomitaka	Women's	Lundholme (SWE); W 29–6	Galysheva (KAZ); W 23–12	Lemley (USA); L DNF–35	Did not advance		7
Rino Yanagimoto	Women's	Cabrol (FRA); L 16–19	Did not advance				17

Park & Pipe

Athlete	Event	Qualification					Final				
Athlete	Event	Run 1	Run 2	Run 3	Best	Rank	Run 1	Run 2	Run 3	Best	Rank
Toma Matsuura	Men's halfpipe	69.25	74.75	—N/a	74.75	13	Did not advance				13
Nanaho Kiriyama	Women's halfpipe	49.75	52.50	—N/a	52.50	19	Did not advance				19
Yuna Koga	Women's big air	65.25	12.50	DNI	77.75	25	Did not advance				25
Yuna Koga	Women's slopestyle	35.66	42.90	—N/a	42.90	18	Did not advance				18
Kokone Kondo	Women's slopestyle	DNS									

Ski cross

Athlete	Event	Seeding		1/8 final	Quarterfinal	Semifinal	Final	
Athlete	Event	Time	Rank	Position	Position	Position	Position	Rank
Satoshi Furuno	Men's ski cross	1:07.12	2	1 Q	1 Q	2 Q	4	4
Ryuto Kobayashi	Men's ski cross	1:10.15	31	4	Did not advance			30
Ryo Sugai	Men's ski cross	1:08.13	19	3	Did not advance			22
Makiko Arai	Women's ski cross	DNF		4	Did not advance			31
Sakurako Mukogawa	Women's ski cross	1:18.88	27	4	Did not advance			27
Lin Nakanishi	Women's ski cross	1:16.26	24	4	Did not advance			26

== Ice hockey ==
Summary

Key:

- OT – Overtime
- GWS – Match decided by penalty-shootout

Team	Event	Group stage					Qualification playoff	Quarterfinal	Semifinal	Final / BM	
Team	Event	Opposition Score	Opposition Score	Opposition Score	Opposition Score	Rank	Opposition Score	Opposition Score	Opposition Score	Opposition Score	Rank
Japan women's	Women's tournament	France; W 3–2	Germany; L 2–5	Italy; L 2–3	Sweden; L 0–4	4	—N/a	Did not advance			9

=== Women's tournament ===
Japan women's national ice hockey team qualified a team of 23 players by winning a final qualification tournament.

Roster

The roster was announced on 25 December 2025.

Head coach: Yuji Iizuka

No.	Pos.	Name	Height	Weight	Birthdate	Team
2	D	Shiori Koike – C	1.59 m (5 ft 3 in)	56 kg (123 lb)	21 March 1993 (aged 32)	(Japan) DK Perigrine
3	D	Aoi Shiga	1.65 m (5 ft 5 in)	61 kg (134 lb)	4 July 1999 (aged 26)	(Sweden) Modo Hockey
4	D	Ayaka Hitosato – A	1.60 m (5 ft 3 in)	60 kg (130 lb)	22 August 1994 (aged 31)	(Sweden) Linköping HC
5	D	Shiori Yamashita	1.58 m (5 ft 2 in)	53 kg (117 lb)	28 April 2002 (aged 23)	(Japan) Seibu Princess Rabbits
6	D	Kohane Sato	1.64 m (5 ft 5 in)	63 kg (139 lb)	16 March 2006 (aged 19)	(Japan) Daishin IHC
7	D	Kanami Seki	1.68 m (5 ft 6 in)	66 kg (146 lb)	23 June 2000 (aged 25)	(Japan) Seibu Princess Rabbits
8	D	Akane Hosoyamada – A	1.63 m (5 ft 4 in)	62 kg (137 lb)	9 March 1992 (aged 33)	(Japan) DK Perigrine
9	D	Nana Akimoto	1.59 m (5 ft 3 in)	50 kg (110 lb)	8 April 2009 (aged 16)	(Japan) DK Perigrine
11	F	Akane Shiga	1.65 m (5 ft 5 in)	63 kg (139 lb)	3 March 2001 (aged 24)	(Sweden) Luleå HF
13	F	Yumeka Wajima	1.56 m (5 ft 1 in)	50 kg (110 lb)	19 October 2002 (aged 23)	(Japan) DK Perigrine
14	F	Haruka Toko	1.67 m (5 ft 6 in)	64 kg (141 lb)	16 March 1997 (aged 28)	(Sweden) Linköping HC
15	F	Rui Ukita	1.70 m (5 ft 7 in)	71 kg (157 lb)	6 June 1996 (aged 29)	(Japan) Daishin IHC
17	F	Ai Tada	1.58 m (5 ft 2 in)	60 kg (130 lb)	4 April 2006 (aged 19)	(Japan) Daishin IHC
18	F	Suzuka Maeda	1.61 m (5 ft 3 in)	54 kg (119 lb)	16 October 1996 (aged 29)	(Japan) DK Perigrine
19	F	Makoto Ito	1.69 m (5 ft 7 in)	73 kg (161 lb)	2 May 2004 (aged 21)	(Japan) Toyota Cygnus
20	G	Miyuu Masuhara	1.57 m (5 ft 2 in)	53 kg (117 lb)	4 October 2001 (aged 24)	(Japan) DK Perigrine
24	F	Mei Miura	1.62 m (5 ft 4 in)	65 kg (143 lb)	16 November 1998 (aged 27)	(Japan) Toyota Cygnus
27	F	Remi Koyama	1.47 m (4 ft 10 in)	54 kg (119 lb)	17 July 2000 (aged 25)	(Japan) Seibu Princess Rabbits
30	G	Rei Halloran	1.70 m (5 ft 7 in)	65 kg (143 lb)	22 March 2001 (aged 24)	(Sweden) Järnbrotts HK
31	G	Riko Kawaguchi	1.66 m (5 ft 5 in)	71 kg (157 lb)	19 September 2004 (aged 21)	(Japan) Daishin IHC
40	F	Rio Noro	1.64 m (5 ft 5 in)	59 kg (130 lb)	15 May 2004 (aged 21)	(Japan) Daishin IHC
41	F	Riri Noro	1.61 m (5 ft 3 in)	59 kg (130 lb)	15 May 2004 (aged 21)	(Japan) Daishin IHC
91	F	Umeka Odaira	1.62 m (5 ft 4 in)	55 kg (121 lb)	12 December 2008 (aged 17)	(Japan) Daishin IHC

Group play

Pos	Team	Pld	W	OTW	OTL	L	GF	GA	GD	Pts	Qualification
1	Sweden	4	4	0	0	0	18	2	+16	12	Quarter-finals
2	Germany	4	2	1	0	1	10	8	+2	8	Quarter-finals
3	Italy (H)	4	2	0	0	2	9	11	−2	6	Quarter-finals
4	Japan	4	1	0	0	3	7	14	−7	3	Eliminated
5	France	4	0	0	1	3	4	13	−9	1	Eliminated

Source: IIHF
Rules for classification: Tiebreakers
(H) Host

6 February 2026; 12:10 v	France	2–3 (0–0, 1–1, 1–2)	Japan	Fiera Milano, Milan; Attendance: 3,424

Game reference

Alice Philbert
Goalies
Miyuu Masuhara
Referees:
(United States) Melissa Doyle
(Canada) Michelle McKenna
Linesmen:
(Czech Republic) Kristýna Hájková
(Canada) Kirsten Welsh

	0–1	38:34 – Ukita (Ak. Shiga, Sato)
Baudrit (Le Scodan, Peyne-Dingival) – 39:42	1–1
	1–2	56:30 – Ito (Koyama, Miura)
	1–3	57:50 – Maeda (Rir. Noro) (EN)
De Serres (Duvin, Aurard-Bushee) (PP, EA) – 59:48	2–3

2 min
Penalties
2 min
25
Shots
28

7 February 2026; 12:10 v	Germany	5–2 (3–0, 2–2, 0–0)	Japan	Fiera Milano, Milan; Attendance: 3,777

Game reference

Sandra Abstreiter
Goalies
Miyuu Masuhara
Riko Kawaguchi
Referees:
(Czech Republic) Zuzana Svobodová
(United States) Amanada Tassoni
Linesmen:
(Canada) Laura Gutauskas
(Sweden) Jessica Lundgren

Gleißner (Lu. Welcke, Kluge) – 00:44	1–0
Nix (Hark, Hadraschek) – 08:44	2–0
Handraschek (Nix, Kluge) – 13:03	3–0
Handraschek (Kluge, Gleißner) – 25:24	4–0
Kluge (Haider, Hark) – 30:30	5–0
	5–1	36:45 – Miura (Ak. Shiga, Ao. Shiga)
	5–2	37:07 – Wajima (Seki, Miura)

6 min
Penalties
6 min
29
Shots
22

9 February 2026; 12:10 v	Japan	2–3 (0–2, 1–0, 1–1)	Italy	Fiera Milano, Milan; Attendance: 3,769

Game reference

Miyuu Masuhara
Goalies
Gabriella Durante
Referees:
(United States) Samantha Hiller
(Canada) Michelle McKenna
Linesmen:
(Czech Republic) Kristýna Hájková
(Canada) Erin Zach

	0–1	12:34 – Fantin (Lobis, Tutino)
	0–2	18:51 – Fantin (Mattivi, Fortino) (PP)
Ukita (Rio Noro) – 22:48	1–2
	1–3	40:37 – Della Rovere
Ak. Shiga (Sato, Ao. Shiga) – 51:01	2–3

4 min
Penalties
6 min
29
Shots
23

10 February 2026; 12:10 v	Japan	0–4 (0–1, 0–2, 0–1)	Sweden	Fiera Milano, Milan; Attendance: 3,100

Game reference

Riko Kawaguchi
Rei Halloran
Goalies
Ebba Svensson Träff
Referees:
(United States) Kelly Cooke
(Canada) Michelle McKenna
Linesmen:
(Canada) Alexandra Clarke
(Finland) Tiina Saarimäki

0–1	05:25 – Thuvik (Hjalmarsson)
0–2	25:36 – Bouveng (Raunio)
0–3	37:30 – Hallin (Bouveng, Persson)
0–4	41:06 – Olsson (Persson, T. Johansson) (PP)

8 min
Penalties
6 min
20
Shots
31

== Luge ==
Athlete	Event	Run 1		Run 2		Run 3		Run 4		Total	
Athlete	Event	Time	Rank	Time	Rank	Time	Rank	Time	Rank	Time	Rank
Seiya Kobayashi	Men's singles	54.679	24	53.645	23	55.106	25	Did not advance		2:44.430	25

== Nordic combined ==
Athlete	Event	Ski jumping			Cross-country		Total	
Athlete	Event	Distance	Points	Rank	Time	Rank	Time	Rank
Akito Watabe	Individual normal hill/10 km	100.0	122.3	11	31:10.4	10	31:51.4	11
Akito Watabe	Individual large hill/10 km	125.5	122.5	19	26:15.2	20	28:05.2	19
Sora Yachi	Individual normal hill/10 km	96.5	120.3	15	33:29.9	27	34:18.9	23
Sora Yachi	Individual large hill/10 km	128.5	129.3	14	26:45.9	28	28:08.9	21
Ryota Yamamoto	Individual normal hill/10 km	102.5	127.8	3	32:37.4	19	32:56.4	15
Ryota Yamamoto	Individual large hill/10 km	136.5	150.0	1	27:09.4	29	27:09.4	15
Akito Watabe; Ryōta Yamamoto	Team large hill / 2 × 7.5 km	244.5	231.0	3	42:33.7	6	42:54.7	6

== Short-track speed skating ==
Japan qualified nine short-track speed skaters (four men and five women) after the conclusion of the 2025–26 ISU Short Track World Tour.

Men

Athlete	Event	Heat		Quarterfinal		Semifinal		Final	
Athlete	Event	Time	Rank	Time	Rank	Time	Rank	Time	Rank
Shōgo Miyata	500 m	40.886	3	Did not advance					25
Kazuki Yoshinaga	500 m	1:09.908	3 ADV	40.895	4	Did not advance			16
Shōgo Miyata	1000 m	1:26.997	3	Did not advance					23
Kazuki Yoshinaga	1000 m	1:25.944	1 Q	1:24.079	4	Did not advance			13
Shōgo Miyata	1500 m	—N/a		2:23.454	3Q	PEN	Did not advance		20
Keita Watanabe	1500 m	—N/a		2:12.851	4 q	2:16.368	5 FB	2:34.631	12
Kazuki Yoshinaga	1500 m	—N/a		2:21.044	4	Did not advance			22
Dan Iwasa; Shōgo Miyata; Keita Watanabe; Kazuki Yoshinaga	5000 m relay	—N/a				6:53.090	4 FB	6:52.083	7

Qualification legend: Q - Qualify based on position in heat; q - Qualify based on time in field; FA - Qualify to medal final; ADV A - Advanced to medal final on referee decision; FB - Qualify to consolation final
* - Athlete skated in a preliminary round but not the final.

Women

Athlete	Event	Heat		Quarterfinal		Semifinal		Final	
Athlete	Event	Time	Rank	Time	Rank	Time	Rank	Time	Rank
Mirei Nakashima	500 m	43.655	4	Did not advance					21
Rika Kanai	500 m	52.160	2 Q	43.178	3	Did not advance			11
Ami Hirai	1000 m	1:29.276	4	Did not advance					27
Mirei Nakashima	1000 m	1:31.520	3	Did not advance					23
Aoi Watanabe	1000 m	1:30.764	4	Did not advance					29
Ami Hirai	1500 m	—N/a		2:30.194	5	Did not advance			25
Haruna Nagamori	1500 m	—N/a		2:28.606	2 Q	2:21.390	5 ADV FB	2:37.450	13
Mirei Nakashima	1500 m	—N/a		2:53.959	5	Did not advance			27
Ami Hirai; Rika Kanai; Haruna Nagamori; Mirei Nakashima; Aoi Watanabe	3000 m relay	—N/a				4:09.061	4 FB	4:11.40	6

Qualification legend: Q - Qualify based on position in heat; q - Qualify based on time in field; FA - Qualify to medal final; FB - Qualify to consolation final; ADV - Advanced on referee decision

Mixed

Athlete	Event	Quarterfinal		Semifinal		Final	
Athlete	Event	Time	Rank	Time	Rank	Time	Rank
Rika Kanai; Shōgo Miyata; Mirei Nakashima; Kazuki Yoshinaga	2000 m relay	DSQ		Did not advance			12

Qualification legend: Q - Qualify based on position in heat; q - Qualify based on time in field; FA - Qualify to medal final; FB - Qualify to consolation final
* - Athlete skated in a preliminary round but not the final.

== Skeleton ==
Athlete	Event	Run 1		Run 2		Run 3		Run 4		Total	
Athlete	Event	Time	Rank	Time	Rank	Time	Rank	Time	Rank	Time	Rank
Hiroatsu Takahashi	Men's	58.06	21	58.46	24	57.69	22	57.42	=21	3:51.63	23

== Ski jumping ==
DOSB announced 4 men and 4 women participating on 20 January 2026.

Men

Athlete	Event	First round			Second round			Final round			Total	
Athlete	Event	Distance	Points	Rank	Distance	Points	Rank	Distance	Points	Rank	Points	Rank
Ryōyū Kobayashi	Normal hill	100.5	130.8	7 Q	—N/a			104.0	129.8	10	260.6	8
Ryōyū Kobayashi	Large hill	131.0	65.4	11	—N/a			138.5	78.9	2	284.5	6
Naoki Nakamura	Normal hill	103.5	130.2	10 Q	—N/a			104.0	124.8	26	255.0	15
Naoki Nakamura	Large hill	126.0	126.2	21	—N/a			134.5	71.7	16	257.2	15
Ren Nikaidō	Normal hill	101.0	131.1	6 Q	—N/a			106.5	134.9	4	266.0	3rd place, bronze medalist(s)
Ren Nikaidō	Large hill	140.0	154.0	1 Q	—N/a			136.5	75.3	9	295.0	2nd place, silver medalist(s)
Ryōyū Kobayashi; Ren Nikaidō	Team large hill	260.5	272.3	5	261.0	262.9	6 Q	Cancelled			535.2	6

Women

Athlete	Event	First round			Final round			Total	
Athlete	Event	Distance	Points	Rank	Distance	Points	Rank	Points	Rank
Yuki Ito	Normal hill	92.5	117.3	17	95.5	111.3	20	228.6	17
Yuki Ito	Large hill	119.5	122.0	8	117.5	114.9	19	236.9	14
Nozomi Maruyama	Normal hill	97.0	135.7	3	100.0	126.1	4	261.8	3rd place, bronze medalist(s)
Nozomi Maruyama	Large hill	128.0	125.6	7	125.0	131.4	8	257.0	8
Yūka Setō	Normal hill	95.0	123.4	9	92.5	114.4	17	237.8	14
Yūka Setō	Large hill	115.5	116.1	14	118.5	119.1	16	235.2	15
Sara Takanashi	Normal hill	92.0	121.5	14	96.0	117.4	12	238.9	13
Sara Takanashi	Large hill	114.0	114.1	17	127.5	120.4	13	234.5	16

Mixed

Athlete	Event	First round			Final			Total	
Athlete	Event	Distance	Points	Rank	Distance	Points	Rank	Points	Rank
Nozomi Maruyama; Ryōyū Kobayashi; Sara Takanashi; Ren Nikaidō	Mixed team	397.0	517.2	2 Q	394.0	516.8	5	1034.0	3rd place, bronze medalist(s)

== Snowboarding ==
Alpine

Athlete	Event	Qualification		Round of 16	Quarterfinal	Semifinal	Final	
Athlete	Event	Time	Rank	Opposition Time	Opposition Time	Opposition Time	Opposition Time	Rank
Masaki Shiba	Men's parallel giant slalom	DSQ		Did not advance				
Tsubaki Miki	Women's parallel giant slalom	1:32.87	3 Q	Buck (CAN); W −0.22	Caffont (ITA); L +0.02	Did not advance		6
Tomoka Takeuchi	Women's parallel giant slalom	1:36.88	22	Did not advance				22

Cross

Athlete	Event	Seeding		1/8 final	Quarterfinal	Semifinal	Final	
Athlete	Event	Time	Rank	Position	Position	Position	Position	Rank
Remi Yoshida	Women's	1:17.10	28	4	Did not advance			28

Park & Pipe
Men

Athlete	Event	Qualification					Final				
Athlete	Event	Run 1	Run 2	Run 3	Best	Rank	Run 1	Run 2	Run 3	Best	Rank
Taiga Hasegawa	Big air	85.00	8.00	87.25	172.25	5 Q	71.75	16.00	28.75	100.50	11
Taiga Hasegawa	Slopestyle	26.98	72.03	—N/a	72.03	9 Q	82.13	69.05	22.30	82.13	2nd place, silver medalist(s)
Ayumu Hirano	Halfpipe	83.00	85.50	—N/a	85.50	7 Q	27.50	86.50	DNI	86.50	7
Ruka Hirano	Halfpipe	80.50	87.50	—N/a	87.50	5 Q	90.00	90.00	91.00	91.00	4
Ryoma Kimata	Big air	75.75	75.25	89.50	164.75	10 Q	86.25	85.25	DNI	171.50	2nd place, silver medalist(s)
Ryoma Kimata	Slopestyle	73.18	80.83	—N/a	80.83	4 Q	72.80	17.58	54.40	72.80	11
Kira Kimura	Big air	81.75	79.75	91.50	173.25	3 Q	89.00	15.00	90.50	179.50	1st place, gold medalist(s)
Kira Kimura	Slopestyle	69.20	40.33	—N/a	69.20	14	Did not advance				
Hiroto Ogiwara	Big air	90.50	88.00	DNI	178.50	1 Q	21.00	DNI	13.75	34.75	12
Hiroto Ogiwara	Slopestyle	DNS					Did not advance				
Yūto Totsuka	Halfpipe	85.50	91.25	—N/a	91.25	2 Q	91.00	95.00	DNI	95.00	1st place, gold medalist(s)
Ryusei Yamada	Halfpipe	90.25	DNI	—N/a	90.25	3 Q	92.00	DNI	92.00	92.00	3rd place, bronze medalist(s)

Women

Athlete	Event	Qualification					Final				
Athlete	Event	Run 1	Run 2	Run 3	Best	Rank	Run 1	Run 2	Run 3	Best	Rank
Mari Fukada	Big air	25.00	77.50	88.25	165.75	5 Q	18.50	85.00	30.00	115.00	9
Mari Fukada	Slopestyle	71.03	35.61	—N/a	71.03	7 Q	33.98	85.70	87.83	87.83	1st place, gold medalist(s)
Reira Iwabuchi	Big air	72.25	79.50	84.50	164.00	7 Q	82.75	20.50	DNI	103.25	11
Reira Iwabuchi	Slopestyle	73.65	59.46	—N/a	59.46	4 Q	11.51	44.16	52.11	52.11	8
Rise Kudo	Halfpipe	83.50	84.75	—N/a	84.75	4 Q	77.50	81.75	DNI	81.75	5
Kokomo Murase	Big air	86.25	82.50	85.00	171.25	2 Q	89.75	72.00	89.25	179.00	1st place, gold medalist(s)
Kokomo Murase	Slopestyle	84.93	35.13	—N/a	84.93	2 Q	79.30	30.56	85.80	85.80	3rd place, bronze medalist(s)
Mitsuki Ono	Halfpipe	68.25	76.00	—N/a	76.00	11 Q	85.00	DNI	DNI	85.00	3rd place, bronze medalist(s)
Sara Shimizu	Halfpipe	19.75	87.50	—N/a	87.50	2 Q	10.50	DNI	84.00	84.00	4
Momo Suzuki	Big air	79.00	13.50	81.50	160.50	8 Q	54.75	81.50	DNI	136.25	6
Momo Suzuki	Slopestyle	44.08	53.50	—N/a	53.50	18	Did not advance				18
Sena Tomita	Halfpipe	50.50	77.50	—N/a	77.50	9 Q	23.50	68.25	DNI	68.25	9

== Speed skating ==
Japan qualified fourteen speed skaters (seven per gender) through performances at the 2025-26 ISU Speed Skating World Cup.

Men

Athlete	Event	Race	
Athlete	Event	Time	Rank
Katsuhiro Kuratsubo	500 m	34.85	19
Wataru Morishige	500 m	34.62	10
Tatsuya Shinhama	500 m	34.46	6
Wataru Morishige	1000 m	1:09.85	24
Taiyo Nonomura	1000 m	1:08.87	13
Kazuya Yamada	1000 m	1:09.381	20
Motonaga Arito	1500 m	1:47.45	26
Taiyo Nonomura	1500 m	1:46.18	18
Kazuya Yamada	1500 m	1:45.53	12
Shomu Sasaki	5000 m	6:27.97	20

Women

Athlete	Event	Race	
Athlete	Event	Time	Rank
Miho Takagi	500 m	37.27	3rd place, bronze medalist(s)
Rio Yamada	500 m	37.78	9
Yukino Yoshida	500 m	37.98	13
Miho Takagi	1000 m	1:13.95	3rd place, bronze medalist(s)
Rio Yamada	1000 m	1:15.16	7
Yukino Yoshida	1000 m	1:16.11	16
Momoka Horikawa	1500 m	1:59.33	26
Ayano Sato	1500 m	1:58.36	22
Miho Takagi	1500 m	1:54.865	6
Momoka Horikawa	3000 m	4:08.32	18

Mass start

Athlete	Event	Semifinal			Final		
Athlete	Event	Points	Time	Rank	Points	Time	Rank
Motonaga Arito	Men's	2	7:53.95	8 Q	0	8:09.46	13
Shomu Sasaki	Men's	40	7:42.61	2 Q	0	8:05.56	10
Momoka Horikawa	Women's	0	8:46.79	12	Did not advance		24
Ayano Sato	Women's	60	8:36.33	1 Q	0	8:36.58	15

Team pursuit

Athlete	Event	Quarterfinal		Semifinal		Final	
Athlete	Event	Opposition Time	Rank	Opposition Time	Rank	Opposition Time	Rank
Motonaga Arito; Taiyo Nonomura; Shomu Sasaki; Kazuya Yamada	Men's	3:48.14	8 FD	Did not advance		Final D Germany; L 3:47.39	8
Momoka Horikawa; Hana Noake; Ayano Sato; Miho Takagi	Women's	2:55.52	2 Q	Netherlands; L 2:55.95	2 FB	United States; W 2:58.50	3rd place, bronze medalist(s)

== See also ==
- Japan at the 2026 Winter Paralympics
