= Landon Wendler =

American freestyle skier (born 2000)

Personal information
- Born: October 12, 2000 (age 25) Steamboat Springs, Colorado, U.S.

Sport
- Country: United States
- Sport: Freestyle skiing
- Event: Moguls

Landon Wendler (born October 12, 2000) is an American freestyle skier specializing in moguls.

== Career ==
During the 2024–25 FIS Freestyle Ski World Cup, Wendler earned his first career World Cup podium on March 9, 2024, finishing in third place.

In January 2026, he was selected to represent the United States at the 2026 Winter Olympics.

=== Olympic Games ===
Year	Age	Dual Moguls	Moguls
2026 Milano Cortina	25	—	17
