= Walczyk =

Walczyk is a Polish surname. Notable people with the surname include:

- Dylan Walczyk (born 1993), American freestyle skier
- Julia Walczyk (born 1997), Polish fencer
- Mark Walczyk (born 1985), American politician
