= Jung Dae-yoon =

South Korean freestyle skier (born 2005)

Personal information
- Native name: 정대윤
- Born: 24 July 2005 (age 20) Seoul, South Korea

Sport
- Country: South Korea
- Sport: Freestyle skiing
- Event: Moguls
Medal record
Men's freestyle skiing
Representing South Korea
World Championships
Bronze medal – third place	2025 Engadin	Moguls

Jung Dae-yoon (Korean: 정대윤; born 24 July 2005) is a South Korean freestyle skier specializing in moguls. He is a 2025 World bronze medalist in moguls and competed at the 2026 Winter Olympics.

== Career ==
Jung competed at the 2023 FIS Freestyle Junior World Ski Championships and won a silver medal in the moguls event. He again competed at the 2024 Junior World Ski Championships and won silver medals in the moguls and dual moguls events.

During the 2024–25 FIS Freestyle Ski World Cup, Jung earned his first career World Cup podium finish on 28 February 2025, finishing in second place. This was South Korea's first-ever World Cup podium finish. The next month he represented South Korea at the 2025 FIS Freestyle Ski World Championships and won a bronze medal in the moguls event with a score of 81.76. He became the first South Korean athlete to medal at the FIS Freestyle World Ski Championships.

He began the 2025–26 FIS Freestyle Ski World Cup, with two top-ten finishes.
