= Filip Gravenfors =

Swedish freestyle skier (born 2004)

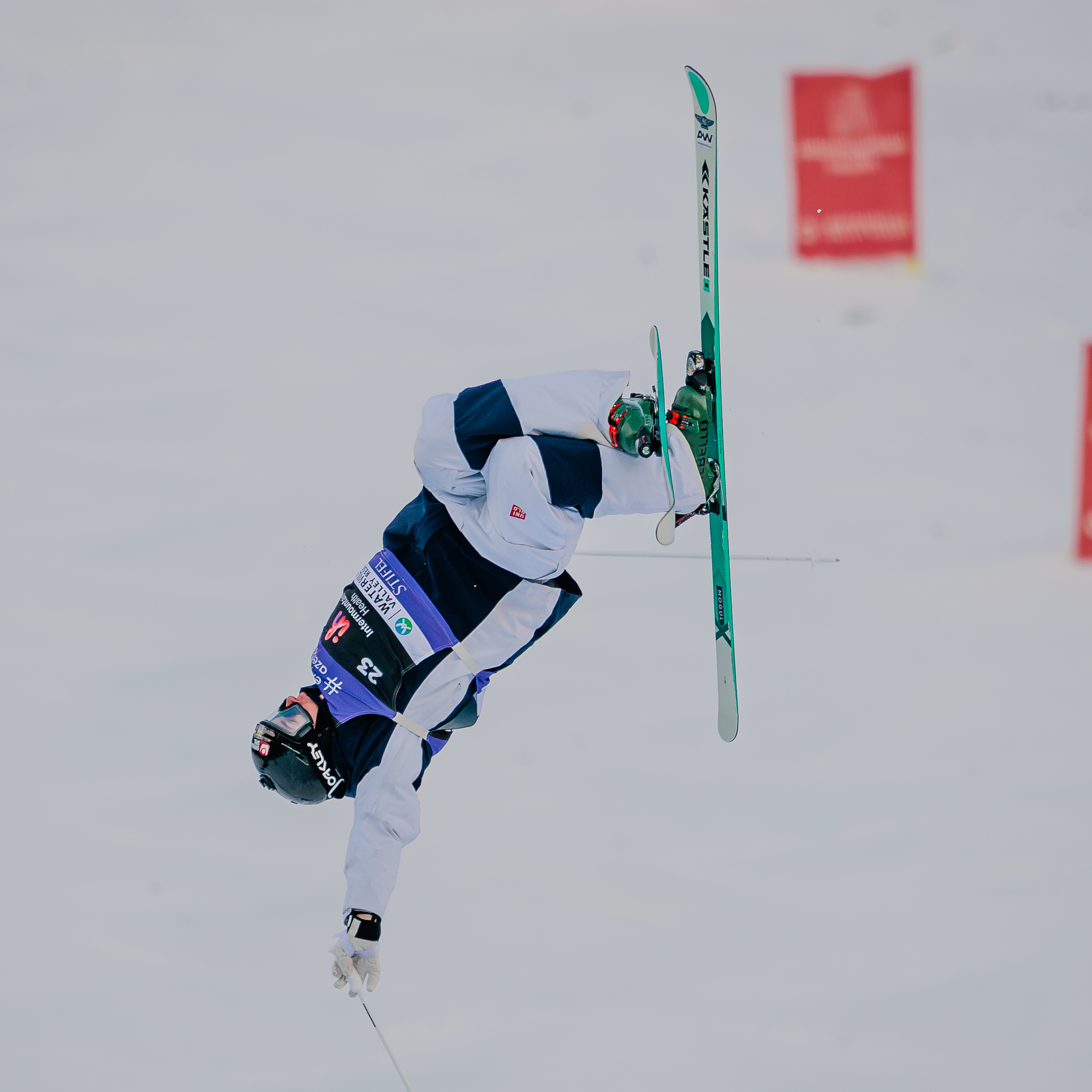
- Gravenfors in 2026

Personal information
- Born: 2 October 2004 (age 21)

Sport
- Country: Sweden
- Sport: Freestyle skiing
- Event: Moguls
Medal record
Men's freestyle skiing
Representing Sweden
Junior World Championships
Gold medal – first place	2023 Chiesa in Valmalenco	Moguls
Gold medal – first place	2023 Chiesa in Valmalenco	Dual moguls
Bronze medal – third place	2022 Chiesa in Valmalenco	Moguls
Bronze medal – third place	2022 Chiesa in Valmalenco	Dual moguls

Filip Gravenfors (born 2 October 2004) is a Swedish freestyle skier specializing in moguls. He is a two-time Junior World Champion.

== Career ==
Gravenfors competed at the 2022 FIS Freestyle Junior World Ski Championships and won bronze medals in the moguls, and dual moguls events. He again competed at the 2023 Junior World Ski Championships and won gold medals in the moguls, and dual moguls events.

During the 2022–23 FIS Freestyle Ski World Cup, he earned his first career World Cup podium finish on 11 December 2022. He finished the 2023–24 and 2024–25 FIS Freestyle Ski World Cup in third place in the overall moguls standings behind Mikaël Kingsbury and Ikuma Horishima.

Gravenfors represented Sweden at the 2025 FIS Freestyle Ski World Championships in the moguls and dual moguls events. During the moguls he had the highest score during qualification of 81.33. However, he finished in seventh place during the final with a score of 82.21. During the dual moguls he advanced to the semifinals, however, he crashed on the last hill and injured himself and failed to medal. He was awarded the Swedish Ski Association's Badge of Honor in October 2025.

He was selected to represent Sweden at the 2026 Winter Olympics. However, he broke his collarbone while training for the Olympic Games, and was ruled out of competition.
