= Thibaud Mouille =

French freestyle skier (born 1999)

Personal information
- Born: 29 September 1999 (age 26) Évian-les-Bains, France

Sport
- Sport: Freestyle skiing
- Event: Moguls
Medal record
Men's freestyle skiing
Representing France
Junior World Championships
Bronze medal – third place	2018 Duved	Moguls

Thibaud Mouille (born 29 September 1999) is a French freestyle skier specializing in moguls. He represented France at the 2026 Winter Olympics.

== Career ==
Mouille competed at the 2018 FIS Freestyle Junior World Ski Championships and won a bronze medal in the moguls event with a score of 83.00

In January 2026, he was selected to represent France at the 2026 Winter Olympics. During the moguls qualification he finished eighth with a score of 76.53 and advanced to the finals.
