= Charlie Mickel =

American freestyle skier (born 2004)

Personal information
- Born: July 6, 2004 (age 21) Durango, Colorado, U.S.

Sport
- Country: United States
- Sport: Freestyle skiing
- Event: Moguls

Charlie Mickel (born July 6, 2004) is an American freestyle skier specializing in moguls. He represented the United States at the 2026 Winter Olympics.

== Career ==
Mickel is a two-time national champion. During the final moguls event of the 2024–25 FIS Freestyle Ski World Cup, he earned his first career World Cup podium on March 11, 2025, finishing in third place with a score of 80.14 points.

In January 2026, he was selected to represent the United States at the 2026 Winter Olympics.

== Personal life ==
Mickel's older sister, Trudy, is a former freestyle skier, after retiring due to health issues.
