= Takuya Shimakawa =

Japanese freestyle skier (born 1998)

Personal information
- Born: 18 December 1998 (age 27) Hokkaido, Japan

Sport
- Country: Japan
- Sport: Freestyle skiing
- Event: Moguls

Takuya Shimakawa (島川拓也, Shimakawa Takuya; born 18 December 1998) is a Japanese freestyle skier specializing in moguls. He represented Japan at the 2026 Winter Olympics.

== Career ==
During the 2023–24 FIS Freestyle Ski World Cup, Shimakawa earned his first career World Cup podium finish on 16 March 2024, finishing in second place.

He represented Japan at the 2026 Winter Olympics in the moguls event and was eliminated in Final 1. He also competed in the inaugural dual moguls event and advanced to the semifinals.
