= Jackson Harvey =

Australian freestyle skier (born 2002)

Personal information
- Born: 7 October 2002 (age 23) Englewood, Colorado, U.S.

Sport
- Country: Australia
- Sport: Freestyle skiing
- Event: Moguls

World Cup career
- Indiv. starts: 19 (MO – 11, DM – 8)
- Indiv. podiums: 0
- Indiv. wins: 0
- Discipline titles: 0

Jackson Harvey (born 7 October 2002) is an Australian freestyle skier specializing in moguls. He represented Australia at the 2026 Winter Olympics.

== Early life ==
Harvey was born in Englewood, Colorado. His mother, originally from Melbourne, worked as a ski patroller for many years before taking a position in guest services at the Winter Park Resort. His father also worked there as a ski instructor. Harvey is a dual citizen of Australia and the United States, and moved to Australia at 19 years old.

== Career ==
In January 2026, he was selected to represent Australia at the 2026 Winter Olympics. During the moguls competition he advanced to the finals and finished in eighth place with a score of 74.93.

== Results ==
=== Olympic Winter Games ===
As of 17 February 2026

Year	Age	Moguls	Dual Moguls
(Italy) 2026 Milano Cortina	23	8	11

=== World Championships ===
As of 17 February 2026

Year	Age	Moguls	Dual Moguls
(Georgia (country)) 2023 Bakuriani	20	28	19
(Switzerland) 2025 Engadin	22	28	18

=== World Cup results by season ===
As of 3 March 2026

Season	Moguls					Dual Moguls					Overall Moguls				
Season	Events started	Pods	Wins	Points	Rank	Events started	Pods	Wins	Points	Rank	Events started	Pods	Wins	Points	Rank
2022–23	5/6	0	0	89	16	5/6	0	0	34	32	10	0	0	123	23
2023–24	0/8	–	–	–	–	0/8	–	–	–	–	0	–	–	–	–
2024–25	2/7	0	0	5	52	2/4	0	0	12	40	4	0	0	17	46
2025–26	4/5	0	0	93	14	1/2	0	0	–	–	5	0	0	93	21
Total	11	0	0	–	–	8	0	0	–	–	19	0	0	–	–
