= Julien Viel =

Canadian freestyle skier (born 2001)

Personal information
- Nationality: Canada
- Born: July 13, 2001 (age 25) Quebec City, Quebec, Canada

Sport
- Sport: Skiing
- Updated on December 24, 2025

Julien Viel (born July 13, 2001) is a Canadian freestyle skier, competing in the moguls and dual moguls. He represented Canada at the 2026 Winter Olympics.

== Career ==
Viel has won multiple medals on the World Cup Circuit. Included in this is a bronze medal in the dual moguls during 2022–23 FIS Freestyle Ski World Cup at the World Cup stop in Valmalenco, Italy. The following season, Viel did not medal in either the moguls or dual moguls, however in the 2024-25 FIS Freestyle Ski World Cup, Viel won a silver in the moguls at the Val St. Come stop, behind teammate Mikael Kingsbury. Viel would later follow up with a bronze medal in the dual moguls at the Beidahu, China World cup stop.

To open the 2025-26 FIS Freestyle Ski World Cup, Viel won bronze in the moguls at the World Cup stop in Ruka, Finland. In January 2026, Viel won his first World Cup medal of his career, by winning the dual moguls event in Val St. Come.
