= Severi Vierelä =

Finnish freestyle skier (born 2001)

Personal information
- Nationality: Finland
- Born: 25 October 2001 (age 24) Jurva, Finland, lived his youth in Kemijärvi

Sport
- Sport: Freestyle skiing
- Event: Moguls
- Club: Ruka Slalom

Severi Vierelä (born 25 October 2001) is a Finnish freestyle skier. He competed in the 2022 and 2026 Winter Olympics.

== Career ==
Vierelä has two top-ten finishes at the Junior World Championships. He also finished in the top ten in both moguls and dual moguls at the 2021 Finnish national championships. He finished 25th out of 30 competitors in the first qualifying round in the men's moguls event at the 2022 Winter Olympics. He then finished 18th out of 20 competitors in the second qualifying round, eliminating him from the competition.
