= Nick Page (freestyle skier) =

American freestyle skier (born 2002)

Personal information
- Full name: Nicholas Page
- Born: August 1, 2002 (age 23) Hollywood, Florida, US
- Height: 5 ft 10 in (178 cm)
- Website: www.nickpage.ski

Sport
- Sport: Freestyle skiing
- Event: Moguls
- Club: Wasatch Freestyle

Nicholas "Nick" Page (born August 1, 2002) is an American freestyle skier. He represented the United States at the 2022 and 2026 Winter Olympics.

He competed in the 2022 Winter Olympics in the men's moguls event and placed fifth.

Page was the second athlete to attempt a cork 1440 in a FIS level competition and the third mogul skier in the world to do a double cork 10 on a mogul course. He also became the youngest man ever to win a moguls Nor-Am event (2019 at Apex Mountain). He grew up in and trains out of Park City, Utah.
