= Cross-country skiing at the 2026 Winter Olympics – Women's 50 kilometre classical =

Women's 50 kilometre classical at the XXV Olympic Winter Games
- Cross-country skiing
- Venue: Cross country and biathlon center Fabio Canal, Tesero
- Date: 22 February 2026
- Competitors: 41 from 21 nations
- Winning time: 2:16:28.2

Medalists
1st place, gold medalist(s)		Ebba Andersson	Sweden
2nd place, silver medalist(s)		Heidi Weng	Norway
3rd place, bronze medalist(s)		Nadja Kälin	Switzerland

The women's 50 kilometre classical competition in cross-country skiing at the 2026 Winter Olympics was held on 22 February, at the Cross country and biathlon center Fabio Canal in Tesero. This was the first time women's 50 kilometre, of any style, had been contested at the Olympics. The distance replaced the women's 30 kilometre, contested previously.

Ebba Andersson of Sweden won the event which became her first Olympic gold medal, after getting silver medals at all distance events at these Olympics. Heidi Weng of Norway won the silver medal, and Nadja Kälin of Switzerland won bronze.

== Background ==
The 2022 champion, Therese Johaug, retired from competitions. The 2022 silver medalist, Jessie Diggins, and the bronze medalist, Kerttu Niskanen, qualified for the event. Diggins was leading both overall and distance standings of the FIS Cross-Country World Cup before the Olympics. Frida Karlsson was the 2025 world champion in the 50 km freestyle. This was the last women's event in the cross-country skiing at the 2026 Olympics.

Karlsson, who had won the 10 kilometre freestyle and 20 kilometre skiathlon golds previously at these Olympics, had to withdraw from the 50 km race due to a cold. Team sprint gold medalist Jonna Sundling also had to refrain from participating due to a cold, and sprint gold medalist Linn Svahn had previously left after falling ill.

== Summary ==
Ebba Andersson won gold with a two-minute margin to silver medalist Heidi Weng. Andersson fell once at the ski exchange, but quickly recovered. Bronze medalist Nadja Kälin finished 6:41 minutes after Andersson.

== Results ==
The race was started at 10:00.

Rank	Bib	Name	Country	Time	Deficit
1st place, gold medalist(s)	3	Ebba Andersson	Sweden	2:16:28.2	
2nd place, silver medalist(s)	6	Heidi Weng	Norway	2:18:43.5	+2:15.3
3rd place, bronze medalist(s)	13	Nadja Kälin	Switzerland	2:23:09.7	+6:41.5
4	9	Kristin Austgulen Fosnæs	Norway	2:23:12.1	+6:43.9
5	1	Jessie Diggins	United States	2:23:14.6	+6:46.4
6	4	Teresa Stadlober	Austria	2:23:23.9	+6:55.7
7	8	Kerttu Niskanen	Finland	2:23:27.2	+6:59.0
8	21	Eliza Rucka-Michałek	Poland	2:23:47.6	+7:19.4
9	12	Katharina Hennig Dotzler	Germany	2:25:16.4	+8:48.2
10	15	Emma Ribom	Sweden	2:25:18.6	+8:50.4
11	18	Patrīcija Eiduka	Latvia	2:25:42.1	+9:13.9
12	31	Cloé Pagnier	France	2:27:52.1	+11:23.9
13	30	Keidy Kaasiku	Estonia	2:28:54.3	+12:26.1
14	2	Karoline Simpson-Larsen	Norway	2:29:30.3	+13:02.1
15	19	Rosie Brennan	United States	2:29:30.8	+13:02.6
16	23	Anna Comarella	Italy	2:31:01.4	+14:33.2
17	32	Jasmine Drolet	Canada	2:31:34.1	+15:05.9
18	34	Sandra Schützová	Czech Republic	2:31:38.8	+15:10.6
19	35	Hailey Swirbul	United States	2:32:09.7	+15:41.5
20	25	Kaidy Kaasiku	Estonia	2:33:32.0	+17:03.8
21	16	Krista Pärmäkoski	Finland	2:33:38.5	+17:10.3
22	37	Sophia Tsu Velicer	Chinese Taipei	2:34:01.5	+17:33.3
23	27	Masae Tsuchiya	Japan	2:34:23.9	+17:55.7
24	28	Barbora Havlíčková	Czech Republic	2:34:32.5	+18:04.3
25	26	Sonjaa Schmidt	Canada	2:34:44.7	+18:16.5
26	29	Kendall Kramer	United States	2:35:00.4	+18:32.2
27	20	Katherine Stewart-Jones	Canada	2:36:35.1	+20:06.9
28	38	Amelia Wells	Canada	2:36:47.9	+20:19.7
29	24	Rosie Fordham	Australia	2:38:30.6	+22:02.4
30	36	Teesi Tuul	Estonia	2:39:07.5	+22:39.3
31	39	Nadezhda Stepashkina	Kazakhstan	2:40:22.6	+23:54.4
32	33	Justine Gaillard	France	2:45:17.7	+28:49.5
33	41	Chi Chunxue	China	Lapped	
34	44	Neža Žerjav	Slovenia	Lapped	
35	40	Anna Melnik	Kazakhstan	Lapped	
36	42	Dinigeer Yilamujiang	China	Lapped	
37	43	Wang Yundi	China	Lapped	
38	45	He Kaile	China	Lapped	
	5	Astrid Øyre Slind	Norway	Did not finish	
	11	Johanna Matintalo	Finland	Did not finish	
	14	Dariya Nepryaeva	Individual Neutral Athletes	Disqualified	
	7	Frida Karlsson	Sweden	Did not start	
	10	Jonna Sundling	Sweden	Did not start	
	17	Katherine Sauerbrey	Germany	Did not start	
	22	Julie Pierrel	France	Did not start	
