= Fischer (company) =

Austrian winter sports equipment company

Fischer Sports GmbH

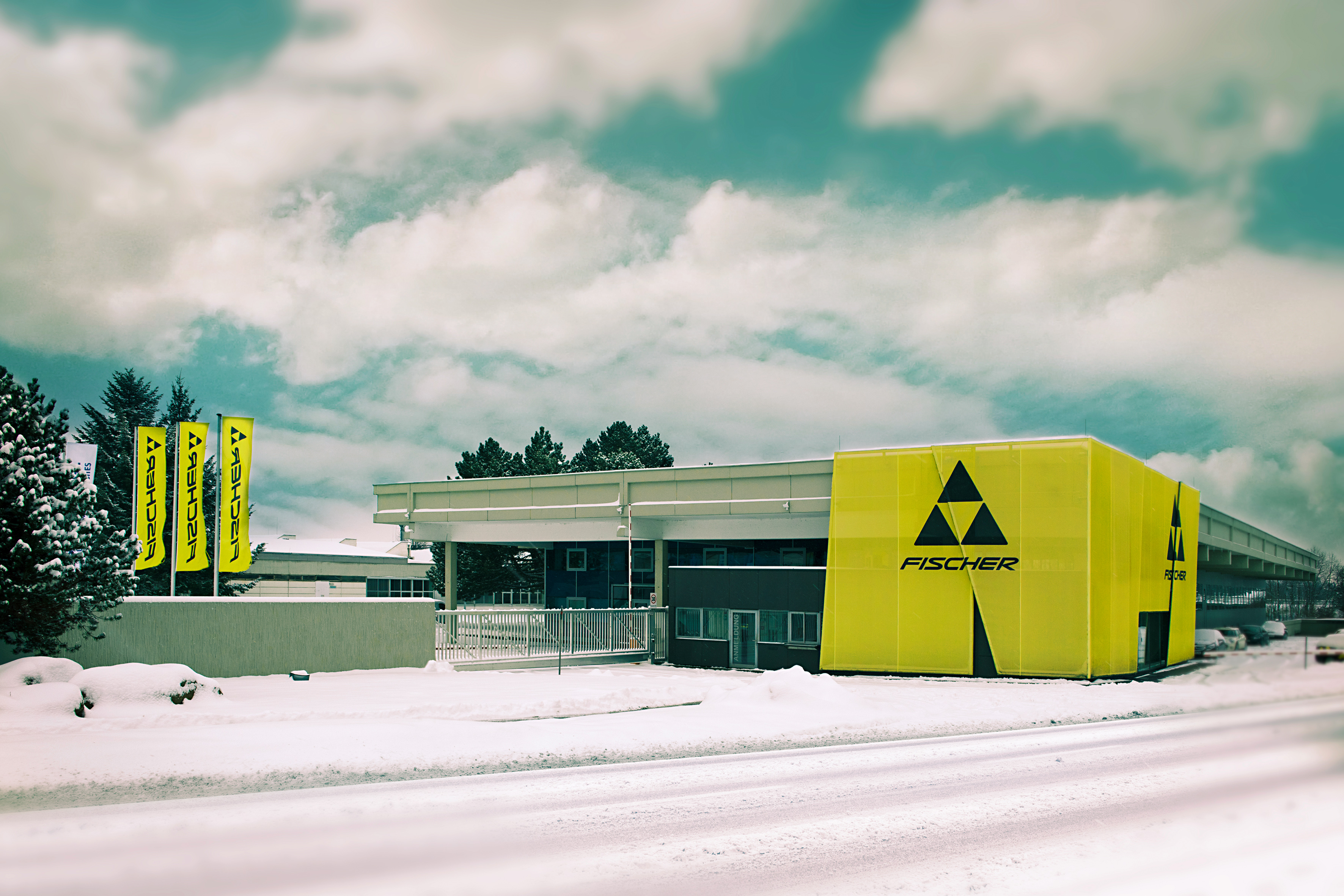
- Fischer Sports Factory at Ried im Innkreis, pictured in 2017
- Industry: Winter sports equipment
- Founded: 1924; 102 years ago
- Founder: Josef Fischer
- Headquarters: Ried im Innkreis (Ried im Innkreis District), Upper Austria, Austria
- Key people: Mag. Franz Föttinger, CEO; Mag. Christian Egger, CFO
- Products: Nordic skiing, Alpine skiing, and ice hockey equipment
- Revenue: List: (2019–20) 191.5 million EUR; (2020–21) 132.9 million EUR; (2021–22) 148.8 million EUR; (2022–23) 198.5 million EUR
- Number of employees: Approx. 480 in Ried, Austria; Approx. 850 at other locations
- Website: fischersports.com

Fischer Sports is an Austrian winter sports equipment manufacturing company, more specifically Nordic skiing, Alpine skiing and ice hockey equipment. Winter sports equipment include skis, boots, bindings, and accessories (bags, backpacks). For ice hockey, Fischer produces sticks, skates, pucks, blades, jerseys, and protective gear (jockstraps, socks, gloves, and visors).

The company's clothing line includes t-shirts, polo shirts, jackets, pants, hoodies, raincoats, knit caps, gloves, kerchiefs, and socks.

== History ==
The company was founded in 1924 by Josef Fischer Sr., a cartwright, in Ried im Innkreis, northeast of Salzburg, Austria. In addition to making wagons, he made an occasional pair of skis. By 1938, the company had significantly expanded its ski manufacturing, with 30 employees, and sales of handmade skis in the United States reached 2,000 pairs. Following the conclusion of World War II, Josef Fischer Jr. became involved in the reconstruction of the company.

In 1949, Fischer developed the first ski press to speed up production, which was still by hand. By 1958, the company employed 137 craftsmen, and was manufacturing 53,000 pairs of skis annually. In that year, Fischer adopted its three-triangle logo. In 1964, the company completed a new factory on the outskirts of town, featuring a state-of-the-art computerized sawmill. Fischer also introduced metal skis for the first time, on which Egon Zimmermann won the downhill at the 1964 Winter Olympics. By 1967, the company had 775 employees, and produced 330,000 pairs of skis. The company's research efforts over the years include skis for racing, including alpine skiing, cross-country skiing, and skis for attempting the world speed record.

In the early 70s, Fischer became the biggest ski manufacturer in the world. The Europa 77, with its fibre-glass technology, was revolutionary. This was the foundation to capture the Scandinavian market. Franz Klammer won the Olympics in 1976 on Fischer C4 skis. In 1988, Fischer opened the factory in Mukachevo, Ukraine.

2002 was the year of Fischer's stock buy-back. Since then, Fischer has been 100% family-owned.

Fischer Tennis division was sold to tennis accessories manufacturer Pacific Entermark GmbH in 2009.

== Success in professional sports ==
At the Winter Olympic Games in Sochi 39 gold, 36 silver and 35 bronze medals were awarded to athletes with Fischer equipment: a total of 108 medals, which were won mainly in the Nordic disciplines. This surpassed the result at the Winter Olympic Games in Vancouver 2010 (74 medals).

The Norwegian athlete Marit Bjørgen, who is equipped by Fischer, is the best female Olympic cross country skier of all time. In Sochi she won three gold medals. US-American Joss Christensen is the first Olympic champion in the Alpine discipline of Freeski Slopestyle.

At the Alpine, Nordic and Biathlon World Championships 2017 in St. Moritz (SUI), Lahti (FIN) and Hochfilzen (AUT) the Fischer equipped athletes took 45 gold-, 43 silver- and 38 bronze medals – a total of 126 medals. At the 2019 World Championships in Seefeld (AUT), Östersund (SWE)and Åre (SWE) there were 129 medals - 45 gold, 40 silver and 43 bronze.

== Affiliated companies ==
Fischer Sports has several affiliates:

- Fischer Deutschland GmbH (Germany)
- Fischer France SARL (France)
- Fischer Mukachevo (Ukraine)
- Fischer Skis US, LLC (United States)
- Fischer Footwear SRL, Montebelluna (Italy)

== In Alpine skiing ==
=== Active ===
Athlete	Sport
Eva-Maria Brem	alpine skiing
Adrien Coirier	freeskiing
Lynsey Dyer	freeskiing
Thomas Fanara	alpine skiing
Max Kroneck	freeskiing
Sandra Lahnsteiner	freeskiing
Roland Leitinger	alpine skiing
Manfred Mölgg	alpine skiing
Steven Nyman	alpine skiing
Nicole Schmidhofer	alpine skiing
Max Franz	alpine skiing
Kyle Smaine	freeskiing

=== Retired ===
Athlete	Sport
Kristian Ghedina	alpine skiing
Nicole Hosp	alpine skiing
Denise Karbon	alpine skiing
Franz Klammer	alpine skiing
Hans Knauß	alpine skiing
Tanja Poutiainen	alpine skiing
Michael von Grünigen	alpine skiing
Harti Weirather	alpine skiing
Egon Zimmermann	alpine skiing

== In Nordic skiing ==
=== Active ===
Athlete	Sport
Kamil Stoch	ski jumping
Dario Cologna	cross country
Eric Frenzel	Nordic combined
Jarl Magnus Riiber	Nordic combined
Johannes Høsflot Klæbo	cross country
Ingvild Flugstad Østberg	cross country
Denise Herrmann	biathlon
Stefan Kraft	ski jumping
Iivo Niskanen	cross country
Frida Karlsson	cross country
Teresa Stadlober	cross country
Astrid Ǿeyre Slind	cross country
Kerttu Niskanen	cross country
Jasmi Joensuu	cross country
Hanna Öberg	biathlon
Lou Jeanmonnot	biathlon
Suvi Minkkinen	biathlon
Rémi Drolet	cross country
Xavier McKeever	cross country
Olivia Bouffard-Nesbitt	cross country

Retired:

Athlete	Sport
Maiken Caspersen Falla	cross country
Charlotte Kalla	cross country
Kaisa Mäkäräinen	biathlon
Martin Johnsrud Sundby	cross country
Tora Berger	biathlon
Laura Dahlmeier	biathlon
Sven Fischer	biathlon
Magdalena Forsberg	cross country / biathlon
Andreas Goldberger	ski jumping
Gregor Schlierenzauer	ski jumping
Thomas Morgenstern	ski jumping
Adam Małysz	ski jumping
Magdalena Neuner	biathlon
Petter Northug	cross country
Marit Bjørgen	cross country
Bente Skari	cross country
Yelena Välbe	cross country
Thomas Wassberg	cross country
Therese Johaug	cross country
Johannes Thingnes Bø	biathlon
