= Canada at the 2026 Winter Olympics =

- Flag of Canada
- IOC code: CAN
- NOC: Canadian Olympic Committee
- Website: www.olympic.ca

in Milan and Cortina d'Ampezzo, Italy 6 February 2026 – 22 February 2026
- Competitors: 205 (99 men and 106 women) in 14 sports
- Flag bearers (opening): Mikaël Kingsbury & Marielle Thompson (Livigno)
- Flag bearers (closing): Steven Dubois & Valérie Maltais
- Medals Ranked 11th: Gold 5 Silver 7 Bronze 9 Total 21

Winter Olympics appearances (overview)
- 1924; 1928; 1932; 1936; 1948; 1952; 1956; 1960; 1964; 1968; 1972; 1976; 1980; 1984; 1988; 1992; 1994; 1998; 2002; 2006; 2010; 2014; 2018; 2022; 2026

Canada competed at the 2026 Winter Olympics in Milan and Cortina d'Ampezzo, Italy, from 6 to 22 February 2026. This was Canada's 25th appearance at the Winter Olympics, having competed at every edition since the inaugural games in 1924.

In March 2025, Torino 2006 Olympic champion Jennifer Heil was named as the country's chef de mission.

During the first eight days of competition, Canadian athletes did not win a single gold medal, which became the longest span without one since 1988. This attracted increasing national consternation and discussions over funding for high performance sports. Freestyle skier Mikaël Kingsbury won Canada's first gold medal on February 15, the ninth day of the Olympic calendar.

== Competitors ==
The following is the list of number of competitors participating at the Games per sport/discipline.

Sport	Men	Women	Total
Alpine skiing	5	8	13
Biathlon	4	4	8
Bobsleigh	8	6	14
Cross-country skiing	5	7	12
Curling	5	6	11
Figure skating	6	6	12
Freestyle skiing	16	16	32
Ice hockey	25	23	48
Luge	2	4	6
Short-track speed skating	5	5	10
Skeleton	1	2	3
Ski Jumping	1	3	4
Snowboarding	9	8	17
Speed skating	7	8	15
Total (14 sports)	99	106	205

== Medallists ==
The following Canadian competitors won medals at the games. In the discipline sections below, the medallists' names are bolded.

Medal	Name	Sport	Event	Date
Gold	Mikaël Kingsbury	Freestyle skiing	Men's dual moguls	February 15
Gold	Megan Oldham	Freestyle skiing	Women's big air	February 16
Gold	Ivanie Blondin; Valérie Maltais; Isabelle Weidemann	Speed skating	Women's team pursuit	February 17
Gold	Steven Dubois	Short track speed skating	Men's 500 metres	February 18
Gold	Brad Jacobs; Marc Kennedy; Brett Gallant; Ben Hebert; Tyler Tardi	Curling	Men's tournament	February 21
Silver	Kim Boutin; Florence Brunelle; William Dandjinou; Félix Roussel; Courtney Sarault; Steven Dubois	Short-track speed skating	Mixed 2000 metre relay	February 7
Silver	Mikaël Kingsbury	Freestyle skiing	Men's moguls	February 12
Silver	Éliot Grondin	Snowboarding	Men's snowboard cross	February 12
Silver	Courtney Sarault	Short-track speed skating	Women's 1000 metres	February 16
Silver	Canada women's national hockey team: Erin Ambrose; Emily Clark; Ann-Renée Desbiens; Renata Fast; Sarah Fillier; Jenn Gardiner; Julia Gosling; Sophie Jaques; Brianne Jenner; Jocelyne Larocque; Emma Maltais; Emerance Maschmeyer; Sarah Nurse; Kristin O'Neill; Kayle Osborne; Marie-Philip Poulin; Ella Shelton; Natalie Spooner; Laura Stacey; Kati Tabin; Claire Thompson; Blayre Turnbull; Daryl Watts	Ice hockey	Women's tournament	February 19
Silver	Ivanie Blondin	Speed skating	Women's mass start	February 21
Silver	Canada men's national hockey team: Sam Bennett; Jordan Binnington; Macklin Celebrini; Sidney Crosby; Drew Doughty; Brandon Hagel; Thomas Harley; Bo Horvat; Seth Jarvis; Darcy Kuemper; Nathan MacKinnon; Cale Makar; Brad Marchand; Mitch Marner; Connor McDavid; Josh Morrissey; Colton Parayko; Sam Reinhart; Travis Sanheim; Mark Stone; Nick Suzuki; Shea Theodore; Logan Thompson; Devon Toews; Tom Wilson	Ice hockey	Men's tournament	February 22
Bronze	Valérie Maltais	Speed skating	Women's 3000 metres	February 7
Bronze	Megan Oldham	Freestyle skiing	Women's slopestyle	February 9
Bronze	Piper Gilles; Paul Poirier	Figure skating	Ice dance	February 11
Bronze	Courtney Sarault	Short-track speed skating	Women's 500 metres	February 12
Bronze	Laurent Dubreuil	Speed skating	Men's 500 metres	February 14
Bronze	Danaé Blais; Kim Boutin; Florence Brunelle; Courtney Sarault	Short-track speed skating	Women's 3000 metre relay	February 18
Bronze	Valérie Maltais	Speed skating	Women's 1500 metres	February 20
Bronze	Brendan Mackay	Freestyle skiing	Men's halfpipe	February 20
Bronze	Rachel Homan; Tracy Fleury; Emma Miskew; Sarah Wilkes; Rachelle Brown	Curling	Women's tournament	February 21

Medals by sport
Sport	1st place, gold medalist(s)	2nd place, silver medalist(s)	3rd place, bronze medalist(s)	Total
Freestyle skiing	2	1	2	**5**
Short-track speed skating	1	2	2	**5**
Speed skating	1	1	3	**5**
Curling	1	0	1	**2**
Ice hockey	0	2	0	**2**
Snowboarding	0	1	0	**1**
Figure skating	0	0	1	**1**
Total	5	7	9	21

Medals by date
Day	Date	1st place, gold medalist(s)	2nd place, silver medalist(s)	3rd place, bronze medalist(s)	Total
1	February 7	0	0	1	**1**
2	February 8	0	0	0	**0**
3	February 9	0	0	1	**1**
4	February 10	0	1	0	**1**
5	February 11	0	0	1	**1**
6	February 12	0	2	1	**3**
7	February 13	0	0	0	**0**
8	February 14	0	0	1	**1**
9	February 15	1	0	0	1
10	February 16	1	1	0	2
11	February 17	1	0	0	1
12	February 18	1	0	1	2
13	February 19	0	1	0	1
14	February 20	0	0	2	2
15	February 21	1	1	1	3
16	February 22	0	1	0	1
Total		5	7	9	21

Medals by gender
Gender	1st place, gold medalist(s)	2nd place, silver medalist(s)	3rd place, bronze medalist(s)	Total
Male	3	3	2	**8**
Female	2	3	6	**11**
Mixed	0	1	1	**2**
Total	5	7	9	21

=== Multiple medallists ===
Multiple medalists
**Name**	**Sport**	1st place, gold medalist(s)	2nd place, silver medalist(s)	3rd place, bronze medalist(s)	Total
Steven Dubois	Short-track speed skating	1	1	0	2
Mikaël Kingsbury	Freestyle skiing	1	1	0	2
Ivanie Blondin	Speed skating	1	1	0	2
Valérie Maltais	Speed skating	1	0	2	3
Megan Oldham	Freestyle skiing	1	0	1	2
Courtney Sarault	Short-track speed skating	0	2	2	4
Kim Boutin	Short-track speed skating	0	1	1	2
Florence Brunelle	Short-track speed skating	0	1	1	2

== Alpine skiing ==
Canada qualified one female and one male alpine skier through the basic quota, along with an additional four men and seven women's quota spots, for a total of 13 (five men and eight women). The 13 member team was officially named on January 26, 2026.

Men

Athlete	Event	Total	
Athlete	Event	Time	Rank
Cameron Alexander	Downhill	1:53.49	14
James Crawford	Downhill	1:53:00	9
Jeffrey Read	Downhill	1:54.56	25
Brodie Seger	Downhill	1:54.96	28
Cameron Alexander	Super-G	1:26.87	17
James Crawford	Super-G	1:26.85	16
Riley Seger	Super-G	DNF	
Brodie Seger	Super-G	1:27.08	22

Women

Athlete*	Event	Run 1		Run 2		Total	
Athlete*	Event	Time	Rank	Time	Rank	Time	Rank
Cassidy Gray	Downhill	—N/a				1:41.99	26
Valérie Grenier	Downhill	—N/a				DSQ	
Cassidy Gray	Super-G	—N/a				DNF	
Valérie Grenier	Super-G	—N/a				DNF	
Kiki Alexander	Slalom	51.74	42	55.75	35	1:47.49	35
Ali Nullmeyer	Slalom	49.47	20	52.70	11	1:42.17	16
Amelia Smart	Slalom	50.06	31	54.43	26	1:44.49	27
Laurence St-Germain	Slalom	49.39	18	52.43	6	1:41.82	12
Cassidy Gray	Giant slalom	DNF					
Valérie Grenier	Giant slalom	1:04.26	8	1:10.32	16	2:14.58	13
Britt Richardson	Giant slalom	1:04.97	21	1:11.6	28	2:16.65	26
Justine Lamontagne	Giant slalom	1:06.34	31	1:11.48	27	2:17.82	28
Cassidy Gray; Ali Nullmeyer	Team combined	1:41.15	22	DSQ		DNF	
Valérie Grenier; Laurence St-Germain	Team combined	1:39.10	19	44.95	7	2:24.05	13

== Biathlon ==
Canada qualified four female and four male biathletes through the 2024–25 Biathlon World Cup.

Men

Athlete	Event	Time	Misses	Rank
Zachary Connelly	Sprint	25:33.5	4 (0+4)	48
Jasper Fleming	Sprint	26:46.1	4 (3+1)	80
Logan Pletz	Sprint	25:46.7	2 (1+1)	55
Adam Runnalls	Sprint	25:02.5	1 (0+1)	31
Adam Runnalls	Pursuit	36:48.3	7 (1+1+4+1)	49
Zachary Connelly	Pursuit	35:51.3	5 (3+0+1+1)	41
Logan Pletz	Pursuit	37:28.0	5 (1+1+2+1)	53
Zachary Connelly	Individual	1:00:39.1	6 (1+3+1+1)	66
Jasper Fleming	Individual	1:05:15.5	8 (1+3+2+2)	86
Logan Pletz	Individual	1:01:42.9	5 (2+1+1+1)	77
Adam Runnalls	Individual	1:00:04.5	5 (1+2+1+1)	64
Zachary Connelly; Jasper Fleming; Logan Pletz; Adam Runnalls	Team relay	1:26:26.9	16 (3+13)	17

Women

Athlete	Event	Time	Misses	Rank
Nadia Moser	Sprint	23:22.6	3 (0+3)	61
Pascale Paradis	Sprint	23:46.7	3 (3+0)	67
Benita Peiffer	Sprint	23:08.5	1 (1+0)	56
Shilo Rousseau	Sprint	24:32.0	3 (2+1)	80
Benita Peiffer	Pursuit	36:43.0	6 (1+2+2+1)	58
Nadia Moser	Individual	48:04.6	6 (1+2+2+1)	68
Pascale Paradis	Individual	44:30.5	2 (0+1+1+0)	24
Benita Peiffer	Individual	DNS		
Shilo Rousseau	Individual	49:45.4	6 (1+2+3+0)	78
Nadia Moser; Pascale Paradis; Benita Peiffer; Shilo Rousseau	Team relay	LAP	13 (2+11)	19

Mixed

Athlete	Event	Time	Misses	Rank
Adam Runnalls; Jasper Fleming; Pascale Paradis; Nadia Moser	Relay	1:08:37.1	1+12	17

== Bobsleigh ==
Men

Athlete	Event	Run 1		Run 2		Run 3		Run 4		Total	
Athlete	Event	Time	Rank	Time	Rank	Time	Rank	Time	Rank	Time	Rank
Taylor Austin*; Shaquille Murray-Lawrence	Two-man	56.18	18	56.07	12	56.08	19	56.27	20	3:44.60	18
Jay Dearborn*; Mike Evelyn	Two-man	56.74	23	56.59	21	56.45	24	Did not advance		2:49.78	23
Taylor Austin*; Keaton Bruggeling; Mike Evelyn; Shaquille Murray-Lawrence	Four-man	54.72	11	55.42	22	55.11	15	55.04	11	3:40.29	14
Jay Dearborn*; Yohan Eskrick-Parkinson; Luka Stoikos; Mark Zanette	Four-man	55.18	22	55.27	18	55.42	20	55.29	19	3:41.16	20

Women

Athlete	Event	Run 1		Run 2		Run 3		Run 4		Total	
Athlete	Event	Time	Rank	Time	Rank	Time	Rank	Time	Rank	Time	Rank
Cynthia Appiah	Monobob	1:00:11	9	1:00.18	9	1:01.23	24	59.61	5	4:01.13	13
Melissa Lotholz	Monobob	1:00:38	14	59.84	3	59.39	6	59.63	6	3:59.24	6
Cynthia Appiah*; Dawn Richardson Wilson	Two-woman	57.68	14	57.66	13	58.41	17	58.04	14	3:51.79	14
Melissa Lotholz*; Kelsey Mitchell	Two-woman	57.29	8	57.64	12	58.82	24	57.78	10	3:51.53	13
Bianca Ribi*; Skylar Sieben	Two-woman	57.57	12	57.55	6	58.16	13	58.16	17	3:51.44	11

== Cross-country skiing ==
Canada qualified one female and one male cross-country skier through the basic quota. Following the completion of the 2024–25 FIS Cross-Country World Cup, Canada qualified further five female and three male athletes. Following the completion of the 2025–26 FIS Cross-Country World Cup first period, Canada was given an additional male quota spot. Most of the Canadian team was selected using the results of the Canadian trials held in Vernon, British Columbia, with Katherine Stewart-Jones earning priority nomination by having achieved two top ten finishes in individual races during the 2024–25 FIS Cross-Country World Cup. The team was officially named on December 19, 2025. Out of the 11 skiers named to the team, eight will be making their Olympic debuts. Antoine Cyr, Remi Drolet and Katherine Stewart-Jones all made the Olympic debuts at the 2022 Winter Olympics.

Distance
Men

Athlete	Event	Classical		Freestyle		Total	
Athlete	Event	Time	Rank	Time	Rank	Time	Rank
Antoine Cyr	20 kilometre skiathlon	24:07.5	18	23:53.0	20	48:30.9	25
Antoine Cyr	50 kilometre classical	2:13:37.8	11	—N/a			
Rémi Drolet	10 kilometre freestyle	—N/a		21:50.8	19	—N/a	
Rémi Drolet	20 kilometre skiathlon	25:26.9	44	24:26.1	42	50:22.0	42
Max Hollmann	10 kilometre freestyle	—N/a		21:56.9	23	—N/a	
Max Hollmann	20 kilometre skiathlon	24:39.8	34	23:23.0	21	48:37.0	27
Xavier McKeever	20 kilometre skiathlon	24:07.0	17	22:45.0	12	47:22.3	13
Xavier McKeever	50 kilometre classical	2:15:07.9	17	—N/a			
Tom Stephen	10 kilometre freestyle	—N/a		21:30.3	9	—N/a	
Tom Stephen	50 kilometre classical	2:15:07.9	17	—N/a			
Antoine Cyr; Rémi Drolet; Xavier McKeever; Tom Stephen	4 × 7.5 kilometre relay	—N/a				1:05:36.8	5

Women

Athlete	Event	Classical		Freestyle		Total	
Athlete	Event	Time	Rank	Time	Rank	Time	Rank
Jasmine Drolet	20 kilometre skiathlon	29:42.9	30	29:59.6	42	1:00:18.8	38
Jasmine Drolet	50 kilometre classical	2:31:34.1	17	—N/a			
Liliane Gagnon	10 kilometre freestyle	—N/a		24:37.6	17	—N/a	
Alison Mackie	10 kilometre freestyle	—N/a		24:01.1	8	—N/a	
Alison Mackie	20 kilometre skiathlon	29:21.2	26	27:50.7	17	57:48.3	22
Sonjaa Schmidt	10 kilometre freestyle	—N/a		25:22.2	34	—N/a	
Sonjaa Schmidt	50 kilometre classical	2:34:44.7	25	—N/a			
Katherine Stewart-Jones	10 kilometre freestyle	—N/a		26:01.7	47	—N/a	
Katherine Stewart-Jones	20 kilometre skiathlon	30:07.6	42	31:05.1	50	1:01:47.4	45
Katherine Stewart-Jones	50 kilometre classical	2:36:35.1	27	—N/a			
Amelia Wells	20 kilometre skiathlon	31:22.7	47	30:32.2	48	1:02:29.4	50
Amelia Wells	50 kilometre classical	2:36:47.9	28	—N/a			
Jasmine Drolet; Liliane Gagnon; Alison Mackie; Sonjaa Schmidt	4 × 7.5 kilometre relay	—N/a				1:19:20.7	8

Sprint
Men

Athlete	Event	Qualification		Quarterfinal		Semifinal		Final	
Athlete	Event	Time	Rank	Time	Rank	Time	Rank	Time	Rank
Antoine Cyr	Sprint	3:21.96	39	Did not advance					
Rémi Drolet	Sprint	3:27.72	56	Did not advance					
Xavier McKeever	Sprint	3:22.46	41	Did not advance					
Tom Stephen	Sprint	3:24.02	47	Did not advance					
Antoine Cyr; Xavier McKeever	Team sprint	—N/a				5:56.69	14 Q	18:38.69	6

Women

Athlete	Event	Qualification		Quarterfinal		Semifinal		Final	
Athlete	Event	Time	Rank	Time	Rank	Time	Rank	Time	Rank
Olivia Bouffard-Nesbitt	Sprint	4:01.89	51	Did not advance					
Jasmine Drolet	Sprint	3:54.63	43	Did not advance					
Alison Mackie	Sprint	3:55.46	44	Did not advance					
Sonjaa Schmidt	Sprint	3:55.55	45	Did not advance					
Alison Mackie; Liliane Gagnon	Team sprint	—N/a				6:46.66	3 Q	20:49.43	6

== Curling ==
Canada qualified a full curling team, by earning spots in the men's, women's and mixed doubles tournaments. On December 1, 2025, a total of 11 curlers (five men and six women) were officially named to the team. Brett Gallant will compete in both the men's and mixed doubles tournaments, becoming the first Canadian curler to compete in two events at the same Olympics.

Summary

Team	Event	Group stage										Semifinal	Final / BM	
Team	Event	Opposition Score	Opposition Score	Opposition Score	Opposition Score	Opposition Score	Opposition Score	Opposition Score	Opposition Score	Opposition Score	Rank	Opposition Score	Opposition Score	Rank
Brad Jacobs; Marc Kennedy; Brett Gallant; Ben Hebert; Tyler Tardi	Men's tournament	GER; W 7–6	USA; W 6–3	SWE; W 8–6	SUI; L 5–9	CHN; W 6–3	CZE; W 8–2	GBR; W 9–5	ITA; W 8–3	NOR; L 6–8	2 Q	NOR; W 5–4	GBR; W 9–6	1st place, gold medalist(s)
Rachel Homan; Tracy Fleury; Emma Miskew; Sarah Wilkes; Rachelle Brown	Women's tournament	DEN; W 10–4	USA; L 8–9	GBR; L 6–7	SUI; L 7–8	CHN; W 10–5	JPN; W 9–6	SWE; W 8–6	ITA; W 8–7	KOR; W 10–7	4 Q	SWE; L 3–6	USA; W 10–7	3rd place, bronze medalist(s)
Jocelyn Peterman; Brett Gallant	Mixed doubles tournament	CZE; W 10–5	NOR; W 6–3	ITA; W 7–2	USA; L 5–7	GBR; L 5–7	EST; L 6–8	SWE; L 6–7	KOR; L 5–9	SUI; W 8–4	5	Did not advance		

=== Men's tournament ===
Canada qualified a men's team by finishing in the top seven based on the combined points at the 2024 and 2025 World Championships. Team Brad Jacobs, skipped by the 2014 Olympic Champion, qualified as the Canadian representatives by winning the 2025 Canadian Olympic Curling Trials, beating Matt Dunstone in both games of their best-of-three final.

Final Round Robin Standings
Team	Skip	Pld	W	L	W–L	PF	PA	EW	EL	BE	SE	S%	DSC	Qualification
Switzerland	Yannick Schwaller	9	9	0	–	75	40	42	30	3	8	88.7%	9.506	Playoffs
Canada	Brad Jacobs	9	7	2	–	63	45	40	28	8	13	86.5%	28.844	Playoffs
Norway	Magnus Ramsfjell	9	5	4	1–0	60	61	37	38	6	7	80.8%	26.938	Playoffs
Great Britain	Bruce Mouat	9	5	4	0–1	63	48	39	33	2	10	86.4%	16.613	Playoffs
United States	Daniel Casper	9	4	5	1–1	52	65	34	37	5	3	81.7%	17.663	
Italy	Joël Retornaz	9	4	5	1–1	58	67	33	39	6	7	83.0%	17.869	
Germany	Marc Muskatewitz	9	4	5	1–1	51	57	36	37	8	7	84.4%	24.850	
Czech Republic	Lukáš Klíma	9	3	6	–	54	63	35	41	3	5	79.8%	29.013	
Sweden	Niklas Edin	9	2	7	1–0	44	63	31	39	6	3	82.5%	26.000	
China	Xu Xiaoming	9	2	7	0–1	52	63	35	40	3	5	81.4%	34.875	

Source: Official website

Round robin
Canada had a bye in draws 2, 6 and 9.

Draw 1
Wednesday, 11 February, 19:05

Sheet B	1	2	3	4	5	6	7	8	9	10	11	Final
Canada (Jacobs)	0	0	0	2	2	0	0	0	2	0	1	7
Germany (Muskatewitz) 🔨	0	0	2	0	0	2	0	0	0	2	0	6

Draw 3
Friday, 13 February, 9:05

Sheet A	1	2	3	4	5	6	7	8	9	10	Final
Canada (Jacobs) 🔨	1	0	0	2	0	1	0	2	0	X	6
United States (Casper)	0	1	0	0	1	0	0	0	1	X	3

Draw 4
Friday, 13 February, 19:05

Sheet D	1	2	3	4	5	6	7	8	9	10	Final
Canada (Jacobs)	0	0	2	0	1	0	0	4	0	1	8
Sweden (Edin) 🔨	1	0	0	1	0	2	0	0	2	0	6

Draw 5
Saturday, 14 February, 14:05

Sheet C	1	2	3	4	5	6	7	8	9	10	Final
Switzerland (Schwaller) 🔨	2	0	2	0	2	0	2	0	1	X	9
Canada (Jacobs)	0	2	0	1	0	1	0	1	0	X	5

Draw 7
Sunday, 15 February, 19:05

Sheet A	1	2	3	4	5	6	7	8	9	10	Final
China (Xu)	0	0	0	0	2	0	0	0	1	X	3
Canada (Jacobs) 🔨	0	0	1	1	0	2	0	2	0	X	6

Draw 8
Monday, 16 February, 14:05

Sheet B	1	2	3	4	5	6	7	8	9	10	Final
Czech Republic (Klíma)	0	0	0	0	1	0	1	0	X	X	2
Canada (Jacobs) 🔨	1	1	1	1	0	3	0	1	X	X	8

Draw 10
Tuesday, 17 February, 19:05

Sheet C	1	2	3	4	5	6	7	8	9	10	Final
Canada (Jacobs) 🔨	2	0	1	0	1	0	3	1	1	X	9
Great Britain (Mouat)	0	1	0	2	0	2	0	0	0	X	5

Draw 11
Wednesday, 18 February, 14:05

Sheet A	1	2	3	4	5	6	7	8	9	10	Final
Italy (Retornaz) 🔨	0	1	2	0	0	0	0	X	X	X	3
Canada (Jacobs)	0	0	0	2	1	4	1	X	X	X	8

Draw 12
Thursday, 19 February, 9:05

Sheet D	1	2	3	4	5	6	7	8	9	10	Final
Norway (Ramsfjell) 🔨	3	0	2	0	2	0	0	1	0	X	8
Canada (Jacobs)	0	1	0	1	0	3	1	0	0	X	6

Semifinal

Thursday, 19 February, 19:35

Sheet D	1	2	3	4	5	6	7	8	9	10	11	Final
Canada (Jacobs) 🔨	0	1	1	0	0	1	0	0	1	0	1	5
Norway (Ramsfjell)	0	0	0	1	0	0	0	1	0	2	0	4

Gold medal game

Saturday, 21 February, 19:05

Sheet C	1	2	3	4	5	6	7	8	9	10	Final
Great Britain (Mouat)	0	2	0	1	0	2	0	1	0	0	6
Canada (Jacobs) 🔨	1	0	2	0	1	0	1	0	3	1	9

=== Women's tournament ===
Canada qualified a women's team by finishing in the top seven based on the combined points at the 2024 and 2025 World Championships. Team Rachel Homan qualified as the Canadian representatives by winning the 2025 Canadian Olympic Curling Trials, beating Christina Black in both games of their best-of-three final.

Final Round Robin Standings
Team	Skip	Pld	W	L	W–L	PF	PA	EW	EL	BE	SE	S%	DSC	Qualification
Sweden	Anna Hasselborg	9	7	2	–	65	50	45	32	5	14	81.7%	25.806	Playoffs
United States	Tabitha Peterson	9	6	3	2–0	60	54	40	37	3	13	82.1%	34.288	Playoffs
Switzerland	Silvana Tirinzoni	9	6	3	1–1	60	51	35	42	6	4	85.0%	44.338	Playoffs
Canada	Rachel Homan	9	6	3	0–2	76	59	45	38	2	9	80.3%	19.781	Playoffs
South Korea	Gim Eun-ji	9	5	4	1–0	60	53	37	35	8	11	81.2%	23.581	
Great Britain	Sophie Jackson	9	5	4	0–1	58	58	36	36	10	8	83.4%	16.938	
Denmark	Madeleine Dupont	9	4	5	–	49	58	36	38	3	11	77.0%	37.875	
Japan	Sayaka Yoshimura	9	2	7	1–1	51	69	35	43	3	6	78.6%	27.513	
Italy	Stefania Constantini	9	2	7	1–1	47	60	34	40	3	4	78.8%	34.719	
China	Wang Rui	9	2	7	1–1	56	70	37	39	3	9	82.7%	41.206	

Source: Official website

Round robin
Canada had a bye in draws 2, 6 and 10.

Draw 1
Thursday, 12 February, 9:05

Sheet D	1	2	3	4	5	6	7	8	9	10	Final
Canada (Homan) 🔨	2	0	0	1	4	0	3	X	X	X	10
Denmark (Dupont)	0	2	1	0	0	1	0	X	X	X	4

Draw 3
Friday, 13 February, 14:05

Sheet C	1	2	3	4	5	6	7	8	9	10	Final
United States (Peterson)	0	0	1	1	0	4	0	1	0	2	9
Canada (Homan) 🔨	0	2	0	0	1	0	2	0	3	0	8

Draw 4
Saturday, 14 February, 9:05

Sheet B	1	2	3	4	5	6	7	8	9	10	Final
Great Britain (Jackson)	0	0	3	1	0	1	0	2	0	0	7
Canada (Homan) 🔨	1	0	0	0	1	0	1	0	1	2	6

Draw 5
Saturday, 14 February, 19:05

Sheet A	1	2	3	4	5	6	7	8	9	10	11	Final
Canada (Homan) 🔨	1	1	2	0	0	1	0	1	0	1	0	7
Switzerland (Tirinzoni)	0	0	0	1	1	0	4	0	1	0	1	8

Draw 7
Monday, 16 February, 9:05

Sheet C	1	2	3	4	5	6	7	8	9	10	Final
China (Wang) 🔨	0	1	1	0	1	0	2	0	0	X	5
Canada (Homan)	0	0	0	4	0	3	0	2	1	X	10

Draw 8
Monday, 16 February, 19:05

Sheet D	1	2	3	4	5	6	7	8	9	10	Final
Japan (Yoshimura) 🔨	2	0	0	1	0	0	1	0	2	0	6
Canada (Homan)	0	2	3	0	1	1	0	1	0	1	9

Draw 9
Tuesday, 17 February, 14:05

Sheet A	1	2	3	4	5	6	7	8	9	10	Final
Sweden (Hasselborg)	0	0	1	0	3	0	1	0	1	0	6
Canada (Homan) 🔨	0	2	0	1	0	1	0	2	0	2	8

Draw 11
Wednesday, 18 February, 19:05

Sheet C	1	2	3	4	5	6	7	8	9	10	11	Final
Canada (Homan)	0	2	0	1	0	2	0	0	2	0	1	8
Italy (Constantini) 🔨	1	0	1	0	0	0	1	1	0	3	0	7

Draw 12
Thursday, 19 February, 14:30

Sheet B	1	2	3	4	5	6	7	8	9	10	Final
Canada (Homan) 🔨	1	1	0	2	0	4	0	1	0	1	10
South Korea (Gim)	0	0	3	0	1	0	1	0	2	0	7

Semifinal

Friday, 20 February, 14:05

Sheet B	1	2	3	4	5	6	7	8	9	10	Final
Sweden (Hasselborg) 🔨	1	0	1	0	0	2	1	0	1	X	6
Canada (Homan)	0	1	0	1	0	0	0	1	0	X	3

Bronze medal game

Saturday, 21 February, 14:05

Sheet C	1	2	3	4	5	6	7	8	9	10	Final
Canada (Homan)	0	1	0	1	0	3	0	3	0	2	10
United States (Peterson) 🔨	1	0	1	0	1	0	2	0	2	0	7

=== Mixed doubles tournament ===
Canada qualified a mixed doubles team by finishing in the top seven based on the combined points at the 2024 and 2025 World Championships. Jocelyn Peterman and Brett Gallant qualified as Canadian representatives by winning the 2025 Canadian Mixed Doubles Curling Olympic Trials. The pair were the first athletes officially named to the Canadian Olympic team.

Final Round Robin Standings
Team	Athletes	Pld	W	L	W–L	PF	PA	EW	EL	BE	SE	S%	DSC	Qualification
Great Britain	Jennifer Dodds / Bruce Mouat	9	8	1	–	69	46	37	30	0	11	79.6%	20.931	Playoffs
Italy	Stefania Constantini / Amos Mosaner	9	6	3	1–0	60	50	32	31	1	11	78.3%	27.931	Playoffs
United States	Cory Thiesse / Korey Dropkin	9	6	3	0–1	58	45	36	33	0	12	83.1%	25.900	Playoffs
Sweden	Isabella Wranå / Rasmus Wranå	9	5	4	–	62	55	31	34	0	9	80.1%	19.413	Playoffs
Canada	Jocelyn Peterman / Brett Gallant	9	4	5	2–0	58	52	35	31	0	10	78.5%	36.050	
Norway	Kristin Skaslien / Magnus Nedregotten	9	4	5	1–1	52	47	37	33	0	12	77.1%	24.444	
Switzerland	Briar Schwaller-Hürlimann / Yannick Schwaller	9	4	5	0–2	56	67	32	35	0	6	74.5%	24.000	
Czech Republic	Julie Zelingrová / Vít Chabičovský	9	3	6	1–0	45	62	30	34	0	6	69.1%	16.019	
South Korea	Kim Seon-yeong / Jeong Yeong-seok	9	3	6	0–1	47	64	32	34	0	9	75.1%	42.425	
Estonia	Marie Kaldvee / Harri Lill	9	2	7	–	46	65	32	39	0	7	71.6%	19.300	

Source: Official website

Round robin
Canada had a bye in draws 2, 6, 8 and 10.

Draw 1
Wednesday, 4 February, 19:05

Sheet C	1	2	3	4	5	6	7	8	Final
Canada (Peterman / Gallant)	1	4	0	2	0	3	0	X	10
Czech Republic (Zelingrová / Chabičovský) 🔨	0	0	3	0	1	0	1	X	5

Draw 3
Thursday, 5 February, 14:35

Sheet B	1	2	3	4	5	6	7	8	Final
Norway (Skaslien / Nedregotten) 🔨	0	1	0	0	1	0	1	0	3
Canada (Peterman / Gallant)	1	0	2	1	0	1	0	1	6

Draw 4
Thursday, 5 February, 19:05

Sheet A	1	2	3	4	5	6	7	8	Final
Canada (Peterman / Gallant) 🔨	5	0	1	0	1	0	X	X	7
Italy (Constantini / Mosaner)	0	1	0	1	0	0	X	X	2

Draw 5
Friday, 6 February, 10:05

Sheet D	1	2	3	4	5	6	7	8	Final
United States (Thiesse / Dropkin) 🔨	0	2	1	0	1	0	3	0	7
Canada (Peterman / Gallant)	1	0	0	2	0	1	0	1	5

Draw 7
Saturday, 7 February, 10:05

Sheet C	1	2	3	4	5	6	7	8	Final
Great Britain (Dodds / Mouat) 🔨	3	0	2	0	2	0	0	X	7
Canada (Peterman / Gallant)	0	1	0	1	0	1	2	X	5

Draw 9
Saturday, 7 February, 19:05

Sheet B	1	2	3	4	5	6	7	8	Final
Canada (Peterman / Gallant)	0	0	0	2	0	3	0	1	6
Estonia (Kaldvee / Lill) 🔨	3	2	1	0	1	0	1	0	8

Draw 11
Sunday, 8 February, 14:35

Sheet A	1	2	3	4	5	6	7	8	Final
Canada (Peterman / Gallant) 🔨	0	2	0	1	0	2	0	1	6
Sweden (Wranå / Wranå)	2	0	1	0	1	0	3	0	7

Draw 12
Sunday, 8 February, 19:05

Sheet D	1	2	3	4	5	6	7	8	Final
Canada (Peterman / Gallant)	0	1	2	0	0	2	0	0	5
South Korea (Kim / Jeong) 🔨	1	0	0	3	2	0	2	1	9

Draw 13
Monday, 9 February, 10:05

Sheet A	1	2	3	4	5	6	7	8	Final
Switzerland (Schwaller-Hürlimann / Schwaller) 🔨	0	0	2	0	0	2	0	X	4
Canada (Peterman / Gallant)	1	2	0	1	1	0	3	X	8

== Figure skating ==
Through the 2025 World Figure Skating Championships in Boston, the United States, Canada secured one quota in each of the men's and women's singles, two quota the pairs and three quotas in the ice dance, for a total 12 athletes. Furthermore, Canada qualified for the team event. The Canadian team was selected on January 11, 2026 at the conclusion of the Canadian Championships held in Gatineau, Quebec.

Singles

Athlete	Event	SP		FP		Total	
Athlete	Event	Points	Rank	Points	Rank	Points	Rank
Stephen Gogolev	Men's	87.41	10	186.37	2	273.78	5
Madeline Schizas	Women's	55.38	25	Did not advance			

Mixed

Athlete	Event	SP/SD		FP/FD		Total	
Athlete	Event	Points	Rank	Points	Rank	Points	Rank
Trennt Michaud; Lia Pereira	Pairs	74.60	3	125.06	10	199.66	8
Maxime Deschamps; Deanna Stellato-Dudek	Pairs	66.04	14	126.57	9	192.61	11
Paul Poirier; Piper Gilles	Ice dance	86.18	3 Q	131.56	3	217.74	3rd place, bronze medalist(s)
Zachary Lagha; Marjorie Lajoie	Ice dance	79.66	9 Q	120.14	9	199.80	10
Romain Le Gac; Marie-Jade Lauriault	Ice dance	74.35	15 Q	112.83	14	187.18	14

Team event

Athlete	Event	Short program / Rhythm dance						Free skate / Free dance				Total	
Athlete	Event	Men's	Women's	Pairs	Ice dance	Total		Men's	Women's	Pairs	Ice dance	Total	
Athlete	Event	Points Team points	Points Team points	Points Team points	Points Team points	Points	Rank	Points Team points	Points Team points	Points Team points	Points Team points	Points	Rank
Stephen Gogolev (M); Madeline Schizas (W); Lia Pereira / Trennt Michaud (P); Piper Gilles / Paul Poirier (ID) (RD); Marjorie Lajoie / Zachary Lagha (ID) (FD)	Team event	92.99; 8	64.97; 5	68.24; 7	85.79; 7	27	4 Q	171.93; 7	125.00; 6	134.42; 6	120.90; 8	54	5

== Freestyle skiing ==
Aerials

Athlete	Event	Qualification				Final			
Athlete	Event	Jump 1		Jump 2		Jump 1		Jump 2	
Athlete	Event	Points	Rank	Points	Rank	Points	Rank	Points	Rank
Miha Fontaine	Men's aerials	99.56	12	93.21	15	Did not advance			
Lewis Irving	Men's aerials	117.70	4 Q	Bye		111.00	7	Did not advance	
Émile Nadeau	Men's aerials	108.85	9	112.67	9 Q	102.21	9	Did not advance	
Victor Primeau	Men's aerials	84.07	17	103.27	14	Did not advance			
Marion Thénault	Women's aerials	108.61	1 Q	Bye		103.89	7	Did not advance	

Moguls
Men

Athlete	Event	Qualification								Final							
Athlete	Event	Run 1				Run 2				Run 1				Run 2			Rank
Athlete	Event	Time	Points	Total	Rank	Time	Points	Total	Rank	Time	Points	Total	Rank	Time	Points	Total	Rank
Mikaël Kingsbury	Men's	22.86	61.88	79.11	3 Q	Bye				23.24	65.84	82.56	2 Q	22.79	66.38	83.71	2nd place, silver medalist(s)
Elliot Vaillancourt	Men's	23.59	57.23	73.48	16	23.59	60.00	76.25	8 Q	22.24	58.78	76.85	14	Did not advance			
Julien Viel	Men's	23.45	63.12	79.56	2 Q	Bye				22.98	62.95	80.02	7 Q	22.42	61.95	79.78	6

Women

Athlete	Event	Qualification								Final							
Athlete	Event	Run 1				Run 2				Run 1				Run 2			Rank
Athlete	Event	Time	Points	Total	Rank	Time	Points	Total	Rank	Time	Points	Total	Rank	Time	Points	Total	Rank
Laurianne Desmarais-Gilbert	Women's	27.69	58.69	74.13	8 Q	Bye				27.99	57.56	72.49	12	Did not advance			
Ashley Koehler	Women's	27.51	55.05	70.70	13	27.01	53.37	69.61	8 Q	26.20	54.20	71.39	16	Did not advance			
Jessica Linton	Women's	27.02	52.98	69.21	15	27.41	57.12	72.89	6 Q	26.84	50.60	67.04	19	Did not advance			
Maia Schwinghammer	Women's	28.24	60.10	74.90	6 Q	Bye				26.81	60.70	77.18	6 Q	26.42	60.67	77.61	5

Dual moguls
Men

Athlete	Event	1/16 Final	1/8 Final	Quarterfinal	Semifinal	Final	
Athlete	Event	Opposition Result	Opposition Result	Opposition Result	Opposition Result	Opposition Result	Rank
Mikaël Kingsbury	Men's	Kroupa (CZE); W 25–10	Kolmakov (KAZ); W 23–12	Jung (KOR); W 35–DNF	Shimakawa (JPN); W 33–2	Horishima (JPN); W 30–5	1st place, gold medalist(s)
Elliot Vaillancourt	Men's	Shimakawa (JPN); L 15–20	Did not advance				
Julien Viel	Men's	Bye	Shimakawa (JPN); L 35–DNF	Did not advance			

Women

Athlete	Event	1/16 Final	1/8 Final	Quarterfinal	Semifinal	Final	
Athlete	Event	Opposition Result	Opposition Result	Opposition Result	Opposition Result	Opposition Result	Rank
Laurianne Desmarais-Gilbert	Women's	Johnson (USA); L 13–22	Did not advance				
Ashley Koehler	Women's	Li (CHN); W 35–DNF	Lemley (USA); L 10–25	Did not advance			
Jessica Linton	Women's	Amrenova (KAZ); W 21–14	Anthony (AUS); L 8–27	Did not advance			
Maia Schwinghammer	Women's	Duaux (FRA); W 21–14	Laffont (FRA); L 14–21	Did not advance			

Park & Pipe
Men

Athlete	Event	Qualification					Final				
Athlete	Event	Run 1	Run 2	Run 3	Best	Rank	Run 1	Run 2	Run 3	Best	Rank
Dylan Deschamps	Big air	85.00	84.25	90.50	175.50	9 Q	20.75	91.00	46.50	137.50	7
Andrew Longino	Halfpipe	80.00	83.50	—N/a	83.50	7 Q	76.50	DNI	DNI	76.50	7
Brendan Mackay	Halfpipe	87.75	92.75	—N/a	92.75	1 Q	37.75	53.00	91.00	91.00	3rd place, bronze medalist(s)
Dylan Marineau	Halfpipe	59.75	82.25	—N/a	82.25	8 Q	22.50	DNI	DNI	22.50	11
Evan McEachran	Big air	12.25	18.25	34.50	52.75	28	Did not advance				
Evan McEachran	Slopestyle	57.85	34.38	—N/a	57.85	16	Did not advance				

Women

Athlete	Event	Qualification					Final				
Athlete	Event	Run 1	Run 2	Run 3	Best	Rank	Run 1	Run 2	Run 3	Best	Rank
Skye Clarke	Big air	67.75	63.25	64.25	132.00	17	Did not advance				
Skye Clarke	Slopestyle	26.96	9.93	—N/a	26.96	21	Did not advance				
Amy Fraser	Halfpipe	79.00	81.75	—N/a	81.75	7 Q	85.00	DNI	88.00	88.00	4
Elena Gaskell	Big air	64.75	82.00	40.00	122.00	20	Did not advance				
Elena Gaskell	Slopestyle	0.96	15.06	—N/a	15.06	23	Did not advance				
Dillan Glennie	Halfpipe	73.00	DNI	—N/a	73.00	14	Did not advance				
Rachael Karker	Halfpipe	74.50	78.25	—N/a	78.25	9 Q	5.00	79.50	DNI	79.50	7
Megan Oldham	Big air	91.25	56.00	80.50	171.75	1 Q	91.75	89.00	DNI	180.75	1st place, gold medalist(s)
Megan Oldham	Slopestyle	61.05	59.13	—N/a	61.05	7 Q	69.76	38.70	76.46	76.46	3rd place, bronze medalist(s)
Cassie Sharpe	Halfpipe	88.25	DNI	—N/a	88.25	3 Q	Did not start				
Naomi Urness	Big air	79.50	81.75	DNI	161.25	7 Q	86.75	16.75	82.00	168.75	6
Naomi Urness	Slopestyle	48.75	58.40	—N/a	58.40	8 Q	24.65	46.03	64.73	64.73	7

Ski cross
Men

Athlete	Event	Seeding		1/8 final	Quarterfinal	Semifinal	Final	
Athlete	Event	Time	Rank	Position	Position	Position	Position	Rank
Kevin Drury	Men's	1:07.53	7	2 Q	4	Did not advance		
Reece Howden	Men's	1:06.13	1	1 Q	4	Did not advance		
Gavin Rowell	Men's	1:09.46	29	4	Did not advance			
Jared Schmidt	Men's	1:07.37	6	4 RAL	Did not advance			

Women

Athlete	Event	Seeding		1/8 final	Quarterfinal	Semifinal	Final	
Athlete	Event	Time	Rank	Position	Position	Position	Position	Rank
Brittany Phelan	Women's	1:15.87	22	2 Q	4	Did not advance		
Hannah Schmidt	Women's	1:13.92	14	1 Q	3	Did not advance		
Marielle Thompson	Women's	1:13.27	8	1 Q	4	Did not advance		

== Ice hockey ==
Canada qualified 25 male and 23 female competitors in hockey, for a total of 48 athletes.
Summary
Key:

- OT – Overtime
- GWS – Match decided by penalty-shootout

Team	Event	Group stage					Qualification playoff	Quarterfinal	Semifinal	Final / BM	
Team	Event	Opposition Score	Opposition Score	Opposition Score	Opposition Score	Rank	Opposition Score	Opposition Score	Opposition Score	Opposition Score	Rank
Canada men's	Men's tournament	Czech Republic; W 5–0	Switzerland; W 5–1	France; W 10–2	—N/a	1 Q	Bye	Czech Republic; W 4–3 (OT)	Finland; W 3–2	United States; L 1–2 (OT)	2nd place, silver medalist(s)
Canada women's	Women's tournament	Switzerland; W 4–0	Czech Republic; W 5–1	United States; L 0–5	Finland; W 5–0	2 Q	—N/a	Germany; W 5–1	Switzerland; W 2–1	United States; L 1–2 (OT)	2nd place, silver medalist(s)

=== Men's tournament ===
Canada men's national ice hockey team qualified a team of 25 players by finishing sixth in the 2023 IIHF World Ranking.

Roster

The first six players of Canada's roster were announced on June 16, 2025. The remainder of the team was named on December 31, 2025. On February 3, 2026, Anthony Cirelli was ruled out due to injury, with Sam Bennett named as his replacement. On February 5, Brayden Point was also ruled out and replaced by Seth Jarvis. On February 8, 2026, Canada named Sidney Crosby as team captain, with Connor McDavid and Cale Makar serving as alternate captains. Following an injury to Crosby in Canada's quarterfinal game against Czechia, McDavid served as captain for their semifinal game against Finland and the gold medal game against the United States, with Nathan MacKinnon serving as an additional alternate captain for both games.

Head coach: Jon Cooper

No.	Pos.	Name	Height	Weight	Birthdate	Team
6	D	Travis Sanheim	1.93 m (6 ft 4 in)	101 kg (223 lb)	29 March 1996 (aged 29)	(United States) Philadelphia Flyers
7	D	Devon Toews	1.85 m (6 ft 1 in)	87 kg (192 lb)	21 February 1994 (aged 31)	(United States) Colorado Avalanche
8	D	Cale Makar – A	1.83 m (6 ft 0 in)	85 kg (187 lb)	30 October 1998 (aged 27)	(United States) Colorado Avalanche
9	F	Sam Bennett	1.85 m (6 ft 1 in)	88 kg (194 lb)	20 June 1996 (aged 29)	(United States) Florida Panthers
10	F	Nick Suzuki	1.80 m (5 ft 11 in)	94 kg (207 lb)	10 August 1999 (aged 26)	(Canada) Montreal Canadiens
13	F	Sam Reinhart	1.85 m (6 ft 1 in)	89 kg (196 lb)	6 November 1995 (aged 30)	(United States) Florida Panthers
14	F	Bo Horvat	1.85 m (6 ft 1 in)	98 kg (216 lb)	5 April 1995 (aged 30)	(United States) New York Islanders
17	F	Macklin Celebrini	1.83 m (6 ft 0 in)	86 kg (190 lb)	13 June 2006 (aged 19)	(United States) San Jose Sharks
20	D	Thomas Harley	1.91 m (6 ft 3 in)	96 kg (212 lb)	19 August 2001 (aged 24)	(United States) Dallas Stars
24	F	Seth Jarvis	1.78 m (5 ft 10 in)	82 kg (181 lb)	1 February 2002 (aged 24)	(United States) Carolina Hurricanes
27	D	Shea Theodore	1.88 m (6 ft 2 in)	90 kg (198 lb)	3 August 1995 (aged 30)	(United States) Vegas Golden Knights
29	F	Nathan MacKinnon – A	1.83 m (6 ft 0 in)	91 kg (201 lb)	1 September 1995 (aged 30)	(United States) Colorado Avalanche
35	G	Darcy Kuemper	1.96 m (6 ft 5 in)	97 kg (214 lb)	5 May 1990 (aged 35)	(United States) Los Angeles Kings
38	F	Brandon Hagel	1.88 m (6 ft 2 in)	82 kg (181 lb)	27 August 1998 (aged 27)	(United States) Tampa Bay Lightning
43	F	Tom Wilson	1.93 m (6 ft 4 in)	103 kg (227 lb)	29 March 1994 (aged 31)	(United States) Washington Capitals
44	D	Josh Morrissey	1.83 m (6 ft 0 in)	89 kg (196 lb)	28 March 1995 (aged 30)	(Canada) Winnipeg Jets
48	G	Logan Thompson	1.93 m (6 ft 4 in)	94 kg (207 lb)	25 February 1997 (aged 28)	(United States) Washington Capitals
50	G	Jordan Binnington	1.88 m (6 ft 2 in)	78 kg (172 lb)	11 July 1993 (aged 32)	(United States) St. Louis Blues
55	D	Colton Parayko	1.98 m (6 ft 6 in)	104 kg (229 lb)	12 May 1993 (aged 32)	(United States) St. Louis Blues
61	F	Mark Stone	1.93 m (6 ft 4 in)	95 kg (209 lb)	13 May 1992 (aged 33)	(United States) Vegas Golden Knights
63	F	Brad Marchand	1.75 m (5 ft 9 in)	80 kg (176 lb)	11 May 1988 (aged 37)	(United States) Florida Panthers
87	F	Sidney Crosby – C	1.80 m (5 ft 11 in)	91 kg (201 lb)	7 August 1987 (aged 38)	(United States) Pittsburgh Penguins
89	D	Drew Doughty	1.85 m (6 ft 1 in)	95 kg (209 lb)	8 December 1989 (aged 36)	(United States) Los Angeles Kings
93	F	Mitch Marner	1.83 m (6 ft 0 in)	82 kg (181 lb)	5 May 1997 (aged 28)	(United States) Vegas Golden Knights
97	F	Connor McDavid – A / C	1.85 m (6 ft 1 in)	88 kg (194 lb)	13 January 1997 (aged 29)	(Canada) Edmonton Oilers

Group play

Pos	Team	Pld	W	OTW	OTL	L	GF	GA	GD	Pts	Qualification
1	Canada	3	3	0	0	0	20	3	+17	9	Advance to quarterfinals
2	Switzerland	3	1	1	0	1	9	8	+1	5	Advance to qualification playoffs
3	Czechia	3	1	0	1	1	9	12	−3	4	Advance to qualification playoffs
4	France	3	0	0	0	3	5	20	−15	0	Advance to qualification playoffs

Source: IIHF
Rules for classification: Tiebreak criteria

12 February 2026; 16:40	Czechia	0–5 (0–1, 0–2, 0–2)	Canada	PalaItalia, Milan; Attendance: 11,451

Game reference

Lukáš Dostál
Goalies
Jordan Binnington
Referees:
(Sweden) Michael Holm
(Canada) Wes McCauley
Linesmen:
(United States) Nick Briganti
(Canada) Scott Cherrey

0–1	19:54 – Celebrini (Makar, McDavid)
0–2	26:40 – Stone (Marner, Crosby)
0–3	37:26 – Horvat (Marchand, Harley)
0–4	47:42 – MacKinnon (McDavid, Crosby) (PP)
0–5	53:22 – Suzuki (McDavid, Harley)

6 min
Penalties
2 min
26
Shots
36

13 February 2026; 21:10	Canada	5–1 (2–1, 1–0, 2–0)	Switzerland	PalaItalia, Milan; Attendance: 11,510

Game reference

Logan Thompson
Goalies
Akira Schmid
Referees:
(Czech Republic) Jan Hribik
(Canada) Dan O'Rourke
Linesmen:
(Denmark) Albert Ankerstjerne
(Canada) David Brisebois

McDavid (MacKinnon, Makar) (PP) – 05:45	1–0
Harley (McDavid, Wilson) – 10:54	2–0
	2–1	12:42 – Suter (Andrighetto, Kukan) (PP)
Celebrini (MacKinnon) (PP) – 24:14	3–1
Crosby (Marner, Makar) – 47:28	4–1
MacKinnon (McDavid, Celebrini) – 53:03	5–1

6 min
Penalties
6 min
39
Shots
25

15 February 2026; 16:40	Canada	10–2 (3–1, 3–0, 4–1)	France	PalaItalia, Milan; Attendance: 11,498

Game reference

Jordan Binnington
Goalies
Julian Junca
Antoine Keller
Referees:
(Sweden) Christopher Holm
(United States) Kyle Rehman
Linesmen:
(United States) Ryan Daisy
(Czech Republic) Daniel Hynek

Wilson (Doughty, McDavid) – 08:41	1–0
	1–1	08:54 – Douay (Addamo)
Toews (Crosby, Makar) – 09:33	2–1
Stone (SH) – 19:56	3–1
Makar (McDavid, Crosby) (PP) – 32:10	4–1
Celebrini (PS) – 37:16	5–1
Crosby (Stone) – 37:35	6–1
McDavid (Celebrini, Wilson) – 40:20	7–1
	7–2	41:28 – Treille (Addamo, Crinon)
Horvat (Reinhart, Bennett) – 45:14	8–2
Hagel (MacKinnon, Theodore) – 50:46	9–2
Celebrini (Stone, Marner) (PP) – 51:47	10–2

33 min
Penalties
35 min
46
Shots
14

Quarterfinals

18 February 2026; 16:40	Canada	4–3 OT (1–2, 1–0, 1–1) (OT: 1–0)	Czechia	PalaItalia, Milan; Attendance: 10,984

Game reference

Jordan Binnington
Goalies
Lukáš Dostál
Referees:
(Sweden) Mikael Holm
(United States) Chris Rooney
Linesmen:
(Canada) David Brisebois
(United States) Jonny Murray

Celebrini (McDavid) – 03:05	1–0
	1–1	08:34 – Sedlák (Červenka, Gudas)
	1–2	14:49 – Pastrňák (Hronek, Červenka) (PP)
MacKinnon (McDavid, Celebrini) (PP) – 32:16	2–2
	2–3	52:18 – Palát (Nečas, Hertl)
Suzuki (Toews, Jarvis) – 56:33	3–3
Marner (Celebrini, Harley) – 61:22	4–3

4 min
Penalties
6 min
41
Shots
24

Semifinal

20 February 2026; 16:40	Canada	3–2 (0–1, 1–1, 2–0)	Finland	PalaItalia, Milan; Attendance: 11,155

Game reference

Jordan Binnington
Goalies
Juuse Saros
Referees:
(Canada) Eric Furlatt
(Canada) Dan O'Rourke
Linesmen:
(Denmark) Albert Ankerstjerne
(United States) Ryan Daisy

	0–1	16:55 – Rantanen (Aho) (PP)
	0–2	23:26 – Haula (Armia) (SH)
Reinhart (Makar, McDavid) (PP) – 34:20	1–2
Theodore (Sanheim, Wilson) – 50:34	2–2
MacKinnon (McDavid, Celebrini) (PP) – 59:24	3–2

4 min
Penalties
8 min
39
Shots
17

Gold medal game

22 February 2026; 14:10	Canada	1–2 OT (0–1, 1–0, 0–0) (OT: 0–1)	United States	PalaItalia, Milan; Attendance: 11,289

Game reference

Jordan Binnington
Goalies
Connor Hellebuyck
Referees:
(Canada) Gord Dwyer
(United States) Chris Rooney
Linesmen:
(Canada) Scott Cherrey
(Finland) Onni Hautamäki

	0–1	06:00 – Boldy (Matthews, Q. Hughes)
Makar (Toews) – 38:16	1–1
	1–2	61:41 – J. Hughes (Werenski, Hellebuyck)

6 min
Penalties
6 min
42
Shots
28

=== Women's tournament ===
Canada women's national ice hockey team qualified a team of 23 players by finishing first in the 2024 IIHF World Ranking.

Roster

The roster was announced on January 9, 2026.

Head coach: Troy Ryan

No.	Pos.	Name	Height	Weight	Birthdate	Team
2	D	Sophie Jaques	1.72 m (5 ft 8 in)	78 kg (172 lb)	16 October 2000 (aged 25)	(Canada) Vancouver Goldeneyes
3	D	Jocelyne Larocque – A	1.68 m (5 ft 6 in)	66 kg (146 lb)	19 May 1988 (aged 37)	(Canada) Ottawa Charge
4	D	Kati Tabin	1.72 m (5 ft 8 in)	70 kg (150 lb)	21 April 1997 (aged 28)	(Canada) Montreal Victoire
7	F	Laura Stacey	1.78 m (5 ft 10 in)	71 kg (157 lb)	5 May 1994 (aged 31)	(Canada) Montreal Victoire
10	F	Sarah Fillier	1.67 m (5 ft 6 in)	59 kg (130 lb)	9 June 2000 (aged 25)	(United States) New York Sirens
14	D	Renata Fast	1.70 m (5 ft 7 in)	65 kg (143 lb)	6 October 1994 (aged 31)	(Canada) Toronto Sceptres
17	D	Ella Shelton	1.73 m (5 ft 8 in)	68 kg (150 lb)	19 January 1998 (aged 28)	(Canada) Toronto Sceptres
19	F	Brianne Jenner	1.75 m (5 ft 9 in)	71 kg (157 lb)	4 May 1991 (aged 34)	(Canada) Ottawa Charge
20	F	Sarah Nurse	1.75 m (5 ft 9 in)	67 kg (148 lb)	5 January 1995 (aged 31)	(Canada) Vancouver Goldeneyes
23	D	Erin Ambrose	1.65 m (5 ft 5 in)	60 kg (130 lb)	30 April 1994 (aged 31)	(Canada) Montreal Victoire
24	F	Natalie Spooner	1.78 m (5 ft 10 in)	82 kg (181 lb)	17 October 1990 (aged 35)	(Canada) Toronto Sceptres
26	F	Emily Clark	1.70 m (5 ft 7 in)	61 kg (134 lb)	28 November 1995 (aged 30)	(Canada) Ottawa Charge
27	F	Emma Maltais	1.63 m (5 ft 4 in)	66 kg (146 lb)	4 November 1999 (aged 26)	(Canada) Toronto Sceptres
29	F	Marie-Philip Poulin – C	1.70 m (5 ft 7 in)	73 kg (161 lb)	28 March 1991 (aged 34)	(Canada) Montreal Victoire
35	G	Ann-Renée Desbiens	1.75 m (5 ft 9 in)	73 kg (161 lb)	10 April 1994 (aged 31)	(Canada) Montreal Victoire
38	G	Emerance Maschmeyer	1.68 m (5 ft 6 in)	64 kg (141 lb)	5 October 1994 (aged 31)	(Canada) Vancouver Goldeneyes
40	F	Blayre Turnbull – A	1.70 m (5 ft 7 in)	69 kg (152 lb)	15 July 1993 (aged 32)	(Canada) Toronto Sceptres
42	D	Claire Thompson	1.72 m (5 ft 8 in)	60 kg (130 lb)	28 January 1998 (aged 28)	(Canada) Vancouver Goldeneyes
43	F	Kristin O'Neill	1.63 m (5 ft 4 in)	57 kg (126 lb)	30 March 1998 (aged 27)	(United States) New York Sirens
82	G	Kayle Osborne	1.73 m (5 ft 8 in)	77 kg (170 lb)	28 February 2002 (aged 23)	(United States) New York Sirens
88	F	Julia Gosling	1.80 m (5 ft 11 in)	81 kg (179 lb)	21 February 2001 (aged 24)	(United States) Seattle Torrent
94	F	Jenn Gardiner	1.67 m (5 ft 6 in)	69 kg (152 lb)	18 September 2001 (aged 24)	(Canada) Vancouver Goldeneyes
95	F	Daryl Watts	1.67 m (5 ft 6 in)	65 kg (143 lb)	15 May 1999 (aged 26)	(Canada) Toronto Sceptres

Group play

Pos	Team	Pld	W	OTW	OTL	L	GF	GA	GD	Pts	Qualification
1	United States	4	4	0	0	0	20	1	+19	12	Quarter-finals
2	Canada	4	3	0	0	1	14	6	+8	9	Quarter-finals
3	Czechia	4	1	0	1	2	7	14	−7	4	Quarter-finals
4	Finland	4	1	0	0	3	3	13	−10	3	Quarter-finals
5	Switzerland	4	0	1	0	3	5	15	−10	2	Quarter-finals

Source: IIHF

7 February 2026; 21:10 v	Switzerland	0–4 (0–0, 0–1, 0–3)	Canada	Fiera Milano, Milan; Attendance: 3,885

Game reference

Saskia Maurer
Goalies
Emerance Maschmeyer
Referees:
(United States) Kelly Cooke
(Austria) Julia Kainberger
Linesmen:
(United States) Sarah Buckner
(Finland) Tiina Saarimäki

0–1	27:02 – Spooner (Poulin, Fillier) (PP)
0–2	44:03 – Fillier (Fast, Watts) (PP)
0–3	53:36 – Gosling (Ambrose, Thompson) (PP)
0–4	56:44 – Watts (Nurse, Thompson)

12 min
Penalties
4 min
6
Shots
55

9 February 2026; 21:10 v	Canada	5–1 (4–0, 1–0, 0–1)	Czechia	Fiera Milano, Milan; Attendance: 3,901

Game reference

Ann-Renée Desbiens
Goalies
Julie Pejšová
Michaela Hesová
Referees:
(Canada) Elizabeth Mantha
(United States) Amanda Tassoni
Linesmen:
(United States) Sarah Buckner
(Canada) Kirsten Welsh

O'Neill (Fast) – 05:44	1–0
Fillier (Watts, Nurse) – 13:12	2–0
Stacey (Maltais, Shelton) – 13:51	3–0
Gosling (Jenner, Ambrose) (PP2) – 18:57	4–0
Gosling (Jenner, Thompson) (PP) – 20:17	5–0
	5–1	48:38 – Mlýnková (Vanišová, Kaltounková) (PP)

10 min
Penalties
10 min
34
Shots
19

10 February 2026; 20:10 v	Canada	0–5 (0–2, 0–2, 0–1)	United States	PalaItalia, Milan; Attendance: 11,390

Game reference

Ann-Renée Desbiens
Emerance Maschmeyer
Goalies
Aerin Frankel
Referees:
(Austria) Julia Kainberger
(Finland) Anniina Nurmi
Linesmen:
(United States) Sarah Buckner
(Canada) Laura Gutauskas

0–1	03:45 – Harvey (Winn, Knight)
0–2	17:18 – Bilka (Murphy, Harvey)
0–3	21:18 – Simms (Janecke, Murphy) (PP)
0–4	33:00 – Bilka (Murphy, Harvey)
0–5	51:53 – Edwards (Curl-Salemme)

10 min
Penalties
4 min
20
Shots
33

12 February 2026 (Note: The Finland v Canada match, originally scheduled on 5 February 2026, 21:10, was postponed to 12 February 2026, 14:30, due to cases of norovirus in the Finnish team.); 14:30 v	Finland	0–5 (0–1, 0–2, 0–2)	Canada	Fiera Milano, Milan; Attendance: 3,826

Game reference

Sanni Ahola
Goalies
Ann-Renée Desbiens
Referees:
(United States) Kelly Cooke
(United States) Melissa Doyle
Linesmen:
(Czech Republic) Kristýna Hájková
(Sweden) Jessica Lundgren

0–1	15:12 – Gardiner (Gosling, O'Neill)
0–2	31:38 – Watts (Fillier, Jaques)
0–3	33:40 – O'Neill (Shelton, Gosling)
0–4	41:22 – Clark (Turnbull, Stacey)
0–5	52:29 – Clark (Stacey)

0 min
Penalties
0 min
17
Shots
23

Quarterfinals

14 February 2026; 16:40 v	Canada	5–1 (2–0, 1–0, 2–1)	Germany	Fiera Milano, Milan; Attendance: 3,913

Game reference

Emerance Maschmeyer
Goalies
Sandra Abstreiter
Referees:
(United States) Melissa Doyle
(Finland) Anniina Nurmi
Linesmen:
(United States) Jennifer Cameron
(Czech Republic) Kristýna Hájková

Jenner (Maltais, Jaques) – 01:40	1–0
Thompson (O'Neill) – 16:41	2–0
Fillier (Fast, Watts) (PP) – 37:30	3–0
Turnbull (Clark) – 40:38	4–0
	4–1	48:42 – Feldmeier (SH)
Poulin (Fillier, Watts) (PP) – 55:30	5–1

6 min
Penalties
14 min
43
Shots
11

Semifinals

16 February 2026; 21:10 v	Canada	2–1 (0–0, 2–0, 0–1)	Switzerland	PalaItalia, Milan; Attendance: 9,662

Game reference

Ann-Renée Desbiens
Goalies
Andrea Brändli
Referees:
(United States) Kelly Cooke
(United States) Melissa Doyle
Linesmen:
(United States) Sarah Buckner
(Czech Republic) Kristýna Hájková

Poulin (Jaques, Watts) – 21:49	1–0
Poulin (Watts, Shelton) – 28:21	2–0
	2–1	44:53 – Enzler (Müller)

6 min
Penalties
4 min
46
Shots
8

Gold medal game

19 February 2026; 19:10 v	United States	2–1 OT (0–0, 0–1, 1–0) (OT: 1–0)	Canada	PalaItalia, Milan; Attendance: 11,171

Game reference

Aerin Frankel
Goalies
Ann-Renée Desbiens
Referees:
(United States) Kelly Cooke
(Canada) Cianna Murray
Linesmen:
(Czech Republic) Kristýna Hájková
(Finland) Tiina Saarimäki

	0–1	20:54 – O'Neill (Stacey, Fast) (SH)
Knight (Edwards, Keller) (EA) – 57:56	1–1
Keller (Heise) – 64:07	2–1

6 min
Penalties
2 min
33
Shots
31

== Luge ==
Athlete	Event	Run 1		Run 2		Run 3		Run 4		Total	
Athlete	Event	Time	Rank	Time	Rank	Time	Rank	Time	Rank	Time	Rank
Devin Wardrope; Cole Zajanski	Men's doubles	52.996	10	52.910	10	—N/a				1:45.906	10
Trinity Ellis	Women's singles	53.351	14	53.510	16	54.065	19	53.403	15	3:34.329	17
Embyr-Lee Susko	Women's singles	53.028	9	54.390	21	53.294	13	53.090	10	3:33.802	15
Kailey Allan; Beattie Podulsky	Women's doubles	55.735	10	53.747	5	—N/a				1:49.482	10

== Short-track speed skating ==
Canada qualified the maximum team size of ten short-track speed skaters (five per gender) after the conclusion of the 2025–26 ISU Short Track World Tour. The Canadian team was officially named on December 17, 2025. The team was led by 2025–26 ISU Short Track World Tour Crystal Globe winners William Dandjinou and Courtney Sarault. The Canadian team qualified the maximum number of quota spots for the individual events for the first time since Nagano 1998.

Men

Athlete	Event	Heat		Quarterfinal		Semifinal		Final	
Athlete	Event	Time	Rank	Time	Rank	Time	Rank	Time	Rank
William Dandjinou	500 m	40.593	1 Q	40.330	1 Q	40.752	1 QA	PEN	
Steven Dubois	500 m	40.284	1 Q	40.377	1 Q	40.163	2 QA	40.835	1st place, gold medalist(s)
Maxime Laoun	500 m	40.943	1 Q	40.454	3 Q	58.859	4 QB	1:22.896	8
William Dandjinou	1000 m	1:24.672	1 Q	1:23.781	1 Q	1:23.520	1 QA	1:24.671	4
Steven Dubois	1000 m	1:50.137	3	Did not advance					
Félix Roussel	1000 m	1:23.828	1 Q	1:24.227	1 Q	1:57.163	5 QB	1:28.007	10
William Dandjinou	1500 m	—N/a		2:12.610	2 Q	2:15.19	1 Q	2:12.639	5
Steven Dubois	1500 m	—N/a		2:15.888	1 Q	2:19.273	6 ADV A	2:36.955	6
Félix Roussel	1500 m	—N/a		2:17.276	1 Q	YC		Did not advance	
William Dandjinou; Steven Dubois; Maxime Laoun; Jordan Pierre-Gilles; Félix Roussel	5000 m relay	—N/a				6:54.075	1 FA	6:52.425	4

Qualification legend: Q – Qualify based on position in heat; q – Qualify based on time in field; FA – Qualify to medal final; ADV A – Advanced to medal final on referee decision; FB – Qualify to consolation final; YC – Athlete received a yellow card and was disqualified
* – Athlete skated in a preliminary round but not the final.

Women

Athlete	Event	Heat		Quarterfinal		Semifinal		Final	
Athlete	Event	Time	Rank	Time	Rank	Time	Rank	Time	Rank
Kim Boutin	500 m	42.692	1 Q	42.196	2 Q	42.672	2 QA	44.347	5
Florence Brunelle	500 m	42.838	2 Q	42.285	2 Q	42.838	4 QB	43.397	6
Courtney Sarault	500 m	42.464	1 Q	41.974	1 Q	42.463	1 QA	42.427	3rd place, bronze medalist(s)
Kim Boutin	1000 m	1:27.069	2 Q	1:28.907	3	Did not advance			
Florence Brunelle	1000 m	1:30.734	2 Q	1:27.637	2 Q	1:29.903	3 FB	1:31.134	7
Courtney Sarault	1000 m	1:28.178	1 Q	1:28.592	1 Q	1:28.097	1 FA	1:28.523	2nd place, silver medalist(s)
Danaé Blais	1500 m	—N/a		2:28.266	4 q	2:30.937	4 FB	2:42.822	14
Kim Boutin	1500 m	—N/a		2:32.209	2 Q	2:33.734	5	Did not advance	
Courtney Sarault	1500 m	—N/a		2:29.331	1 Q	2:48.617	4 FB	2:35.616	9
Danaé Blais; Kim Boutin; Florence Brunelle; Courtney Sarault	3000 m relay	—N/a				4:04.856	2 FA	4:04.314	3rd place, bronze medalist(s)

Qualification legend: Q – Qualify based on position in heat; q – Qualify based on time in field; FA – Qualify to medal final; FB – Qualify to consolation final; ADV – Advanced on referee decision

Mixed

Athlete	Event	Quarterfinal		Semifinal		Final	
Athlete	Event	Time	Rank	Time	Rank	Time	Rank
Kim Boutin; Florence Brunelle; William Dandjinou; Steven Dubois; Felix Roussel; Courtney Sarault	2000 m relay	2:39.034	1 QA	2:39.607	1 QA	2:39.258	2nd place, silver medalist(s)

Qualification legend: Q – Qualify based on position in heat; q – Qualify based on time in field; FA – Qualify to medal final; FB – Qualify to consolation final
* – Athlete skated in a preliminary round but not the final.

== Skeleton ==
Athlete	Event	Run 1		Run 2		Run 3		Run 4		Total	
Athlete	Event	Time	Rank	Time	Rank	Time	Rank	Time	Rank	Time	Rank
Josip Brusic	Men's	58.14	22	58.40	23	57.54	21	58.24	24	3:52.32	24
Jane Channell	Women's	58.08	15	58.14	17	58.51	19	58.23	17	3:52.96	18
Hallie Clarke	Women's	58.51	21	58.22	19	58.31	17	57.98	11	3:53.02	19
Josip Brusic; Jane Channell	Mixed team	1:01.57	10	1:01.07	15	—N/a				2:02.64	15

== Ski jumping ==
Athlete	Event	First round			Final round			Total	
Athlete	Event	Distance	Points	Rank	Distance	Points	Rank	Points	Rank
Mackenzie Boyd-Clowes	Men's normal hill	95.0	110.8	45	Did not advance				
Mackenzie Boyd-Clowes	Men's large hill	119.5	101.8	45	Did not advance				
Natalie Eilers	Women's normal hill	77.5	74.4	49	Did not advance				
Natalie Eilers	Women's large hill	DNS			Did not advance				
Nicole Maurer	Women's normal hill	98.5	116.3	19	96.5	110.3	22	226.6	19
Nicole Maurer	Women's large hill	121.5	107.7	23	126.0	114.9	19	222.6	20
Abigail Strate	Women's normal hill	93.5	122.7	12	95.5	117.7	10	240.4	11
Abigail Strate	Women's large hill	117.0	106.9	26	131.5	136.7	7	243.6	11

== Snowboarding ==
Alpine

Athlete	Event	Qualification		Round of 16	Quarterfinal	Semifinal	Final	
Athlete	Event	Time	Rank	Opposition Time	Opposition Time	Opposition Time	Opposition Time	Rank
Arnaud Gaudet	Men's parallel giant slalom	1:26.57	4 Q	Yankov (BUL); W	Zamfirov (BUL); L +0.03	Did not advance		
Ben Heldman	Men's parallel giant slalom	1:28.16	26	Did not advance				
Kaylie Buck	Women's parallel giant slalom	1:35.34	14 Q	Miki (JPN); L +0.22	Did not advance			
Aurélie Moisan	Women's parallel giant slalom	1:34.56	12 Q	Król-Walas (POL); L +0.36	Did not advance			

Cross

Athlete	Event	Seeding		1/8 final	Quarterfinal	Semifinal	Final	
Athlete	Event	Time	Rank	Position	Position	Position	Position	Rank
Evan Bichon	Men's	1:08.92	11	3	Did not advance			
Éliot Grondin	Men's	1:06.75	2	1 Q	1 Q	1 Q	2	2nd place, silver medalist(s)
Liam Moffatt	Men's	1:09.76	19	4	Did not advance			
Audrey McManiman	Women's	1:14.52	12	3	Did not advance			
Éliot Grondin; Audrey McManiman	Mixed team	—N/a			4	Did not advance		

Park & Pipe
Men

Athlete	Event	Qualification					Final				
Athlete	Event	Run 1	Run 2	Run 3	Best	Rank	Run 1	Run 2	Run 3	Best	Rank
Eli Bouchard	Big air	73.75	79.00	82.25	161.25	14	Did not advance				
Francis Jobin	Big air	84.75	84.75	86.00	170.75	6 Q	37.25	84.00	65.50	149.50	7
Cameron Spalding	Big air	82.75	62.75	DNI	145.50	22	Did not advance				
Eli Bouchard	Slopestyle	17.65	69.51	—N/a	69.51	13	Did not advance				
Francis Jobin	Slopestyle	13.33	17.80	—N/a	17.80	29	Did not advance				
Mark McMorris	Slopestyle	81.81	78.58	—N/a	81.81	3 Q	75.50	37.56	39.53	75.50	8
Cameron Spalding	Slopestyle	33.61	78.76	—N/a	78.76	5 Q	41.66	75.13	37.30	75.13	10

Women

Athlete	Event	Qualification					Final				
Athlete	Event	Run 1	Run 2	Run 3	Best	Rank	Run 1	Run 2	Run 3	Best	Rank
Laurie Blouin	Big air	15.75	72.50	77.75	150.25	14	Did not advance				
Juliette Pelchat	Big air	76.50	17.50	71.50	148.00	16	Did not advance				
Brooke D'Hondt	Halfpipe	24.00	DNI	—N/a	24.00	23	Did not advance				
Felicity Geremia	Halfpipe	44.00	DNI	—N/a	44.00	17	Did not advance				
Elizabeth Hosking	Halfpipe	61.00	80.25	—N/a	80.25	8 Q	27.50	DNI	DNI	27.50	11
Laurie Blouin	Slopestyle	69.30	32.70	—N/a	69.30	9 Q	40.10	33.73	68.60	68.60	5
Juliette Pelchat	Slopestyle	68.25	19.43	—N/a	68.25	12 Q	20.15	46.43	51.76	51.76	9

== Speed skating ==
Canada qualified 15 speed skaters (seven men and eight women) through performances at the 2025-26 ISU Speed Skating World Cup. Any athlete who was ranked in the top eight automatically qualified for the team, with the rest being selected based on the results of the Canadian trials held in January 2026 in Quebec City. The official team was named on January 15, 2026.

Distance
Men

Athlete*	Event	Race	
Athlete*	Event	Time	Rank
Laurent Dubreuil	500 m	34.26	3rd place, bronze medalist(s)
Anders Johnson	500 m	34.81	16
Cédrick Brunet	500 m	34.95	23
Laurent Dubreuil	1000 m	1:08.21	8
Anders Johnson	1000 m	1:09.54	22
David La Rue	1000 m	1:09.310	18
Daniel Hall	1500 m	1:46.91	23
David La Rue	1500 m	1:46.02	15
Ted-Jan Bloemen	5000 m	6:17.97	13
Ted-Jan Bloemen	10000 m	13:00.01	9

Women

Athlete	Event	Race	
Athlete	Event	Time	Rank
Carolina Hiller-Donnelly	500 m	38.38	21
Béatrice Lamarche	500 m	37.53	7
Brooklyn McDougall	500 m	38.36	19
Carolina Hiller-Donnelly	1000 m	1:17.156	26
Rose Laliberté-Roy	1000 m	1:17.50	27
Béatrice Lamarche	1000 m	1:14.73	5
Ivanie Blondin	1500 m	1:54.93	8
Béatrice Lamarche	1500 m	1:57.65	17
Valérie Maltais	1500 m	1:54.40	3rd place, bronze medalist(s)
Laura Hall	3000 m	4:06.15	13
Valérie Maltais	3000 m	3:56.93	3rd place, bronze medalist(s)
Isabelle Weidemann	3000 m	3:59.24	5
Laura Hall	5000 m	6:50.08	5
Isabelle Weidemann	5000 m	7:02.90	9

Mass Start

Athlete*	Event	Semifinal			Final		
Athlete*	Event	Points	Time	Rank	Points	Time	Rank
Antoine Gélinas-Beaulieu	Men's mass start	60	7:42.49	1 Q	3	8:04.76	6
Daniel Hall	Men's mass start	0	7:53.68	11	Did not advance		
Ivanie Blondin	Women's mass start	5	8:46.50	6 Q	40	8:35.09	2nd place, silver medalist(s)
Valérie Maltais	Women's mass start	11	8:36.69	4 Q	6	8:36.10	5

Team pursuit

Athlete	Event	Quarterfinal		Semifinal	Final	
Athlete	Event	Time	Rank	Opposition Time	Opposition Time	Rank
Ivanie Blondin; Valérie Maltais; Isabelle Weidemann	Women's team pursuit	2:55.03	1 SF1	United States; W 2:55.92 FA	Netherlands; W 2:55.81	1st place, gold medalist(s)

== See also ==
- Canada at the 2026 Winter Paralympics
- Canada at the 2026 Commonwealth Games
