= Elias Keck =

German cross-country skier (born 2003)

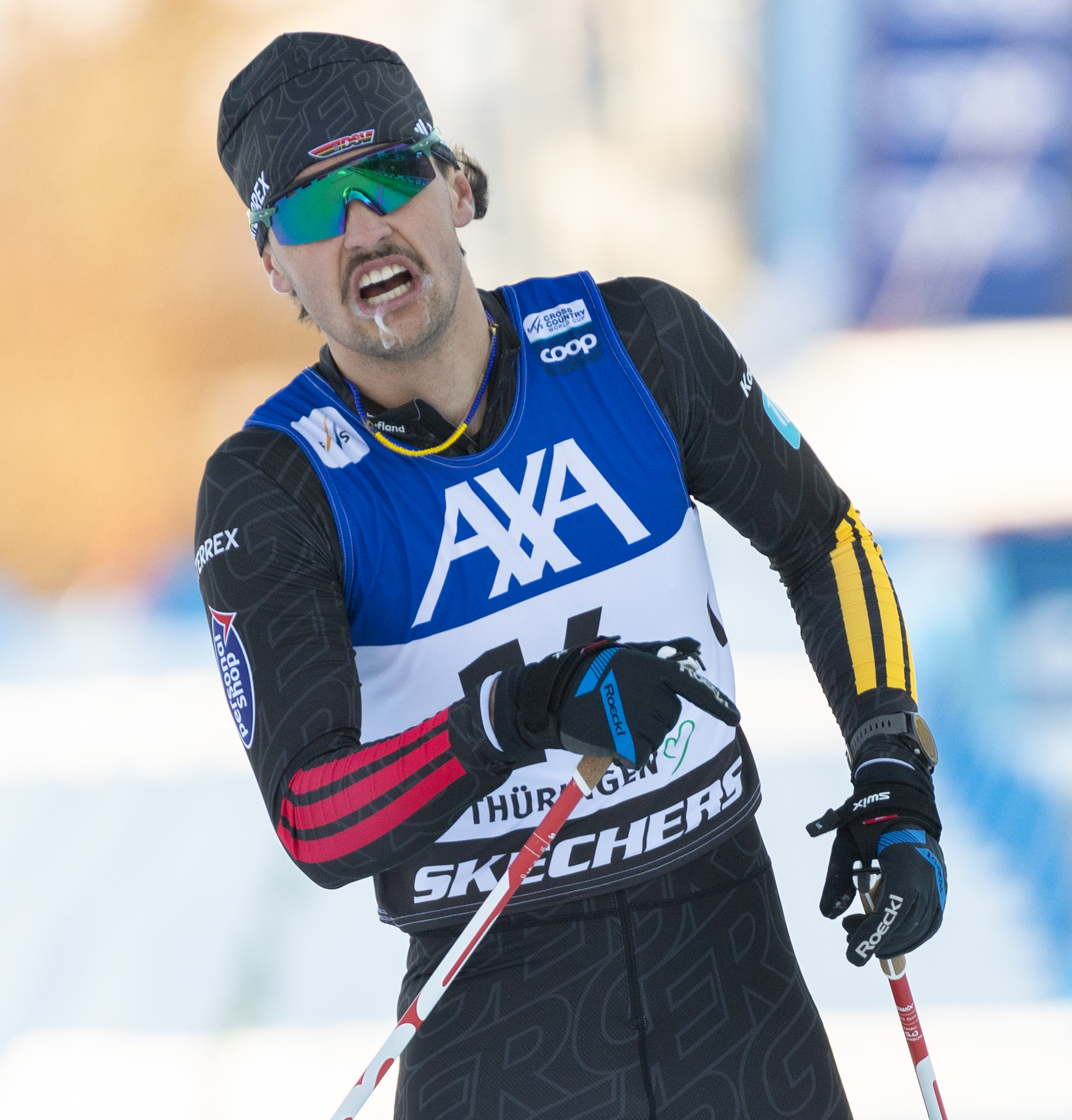

Personal information
- Nationality: Germany
- Born: March 29, 2003 (age 23) Kempten, Germany

Sport
- Sport: Skiing
- Club: Tsv Buchenberg
Medal record
Men's cross-country skiing
Representing Germany
World U23 Championships
Gold medal – first place	2026 Lillehammer	20 km freestyle
Silver medal – second place	2026 Lillehammer	Sprint freestyle
Youth Winter Olympic Games
Silver medal – second place	2020 Lausanne	10 km classical

Elias Keck (born March 29, 2003) is a German cross-country skier. He won the silver medal in the 10 km classical event at the 2020 Winter Youth Olympics in Lausanne. At the 2026 Nordic Junior World Ski Championships he won the Men's U23 20 km mass start freestyle event and placed second in the sprint freestyle.

== Results ==
=== World Championships ===
Year	Age	10 km individual	Skiathlon	50 km mass start	Sprint	Relay	Team sprint
2025	22	—	30	—	32	—	10
