= Niko Anttola =

Finnish cross-country skier (born 2003)

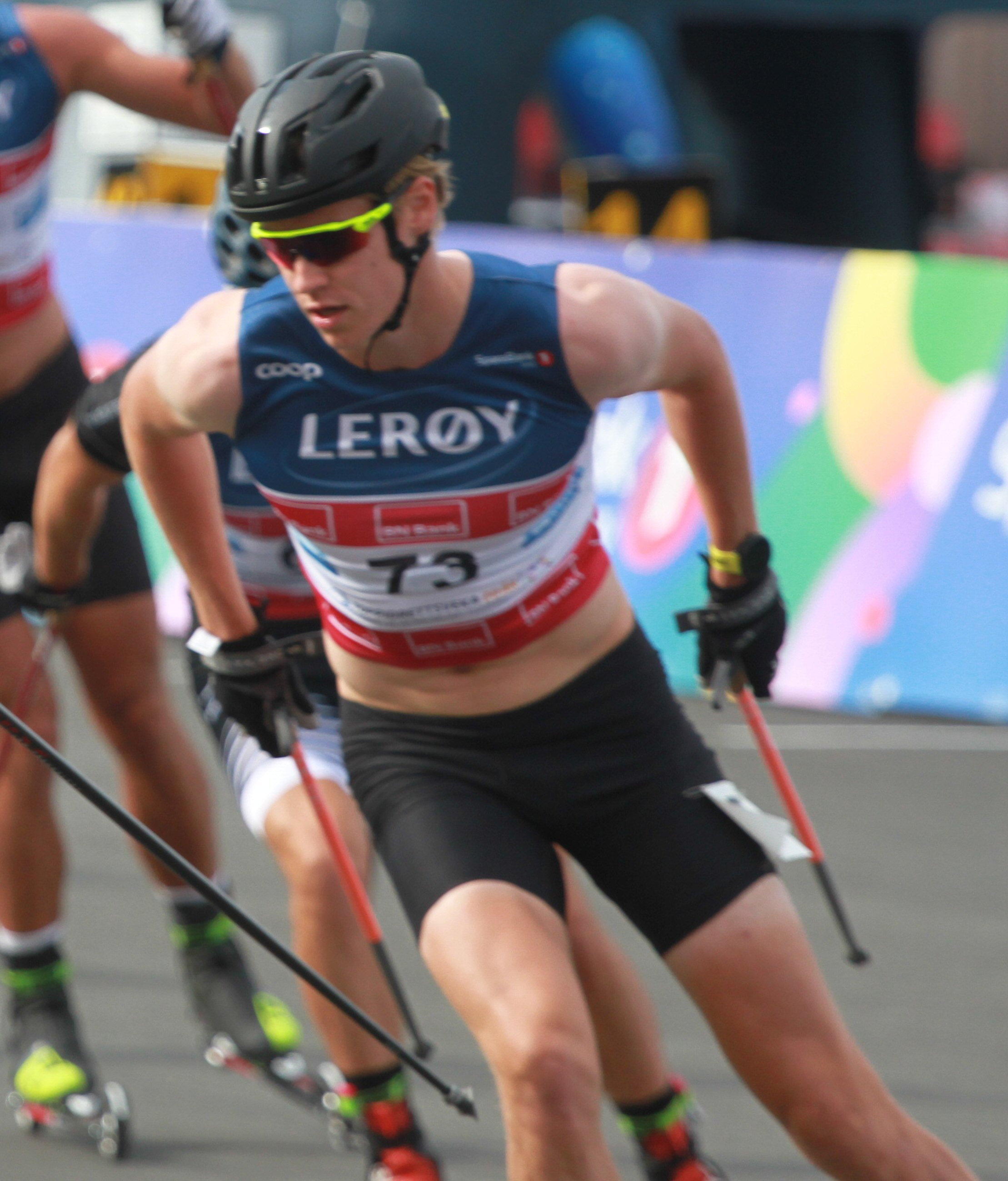
- Niko Anttola

Personal information
- Nationality: Finland
- Born: 13 February 2003 (age 23) Tornio, Finland

Sport
- Sport: Skiing
- Club: ProSki Oulu

World Cup career
- Seasons: 4 – (2022–present)
- Indiv. starts: 33
Medal record
Men's cross-country skiing
Representing Finland
World U23 Championships
Gold medal – first place	2026 Lillehammer	10 km classical
Silver medal – second place	2025 Schilpario	20 km mass start
Bronze medal – third place	2026 Lillehammer	4 × 5 km relay
World Championships
Silver medal – second place	2021 Vuokatti	4 × 5 km relay
Silver medal – second place	2022 Zakopane	10 km classical
- Updated on 10 February 2026

Niko Anttola (born 13 February 2003) is a Finnish cross-country skier. He is best known for winning a silver medal in relay the 2023 World Championships.

== Career ==
He hails from Tornio and is coached by his father, Marko Anttola. At the 2021 Junior World Championships he won a silver medal in the 4 × 5 kilometre relay, followed by a silver medal in the 10 kilometre race at the 2022 Junior World Championships. At the 2023 Junior World Championships he won the gold medal in the 10 kilometre race and the silver medal in the 20 kilometres.

He made his World Cup debut in February 2022 in Lahti, collecting his first World Cup points during the 2022–23 FIS Cross-Country World Cup. He broke into the top 20 for the first time in March 2024 in Lahti, finishing 19th in the 20 kilometres.

At the 2023 World Championships in Planica, he finished 24th in the 15 kilometre race and won a silver medal in the 4 × 10 kilometre relay. He was described by YLE as a wildcard for the relay team; when the World Cup season started in late 2022, "Those who envisioned Niko Anttola as the anchor in the World Championships relay can barely be regarded as sane".

The 2023–24 season was spoiled by illnesses.
