= Nadja Kälin =

Swiss cross-country skier (born 2001)

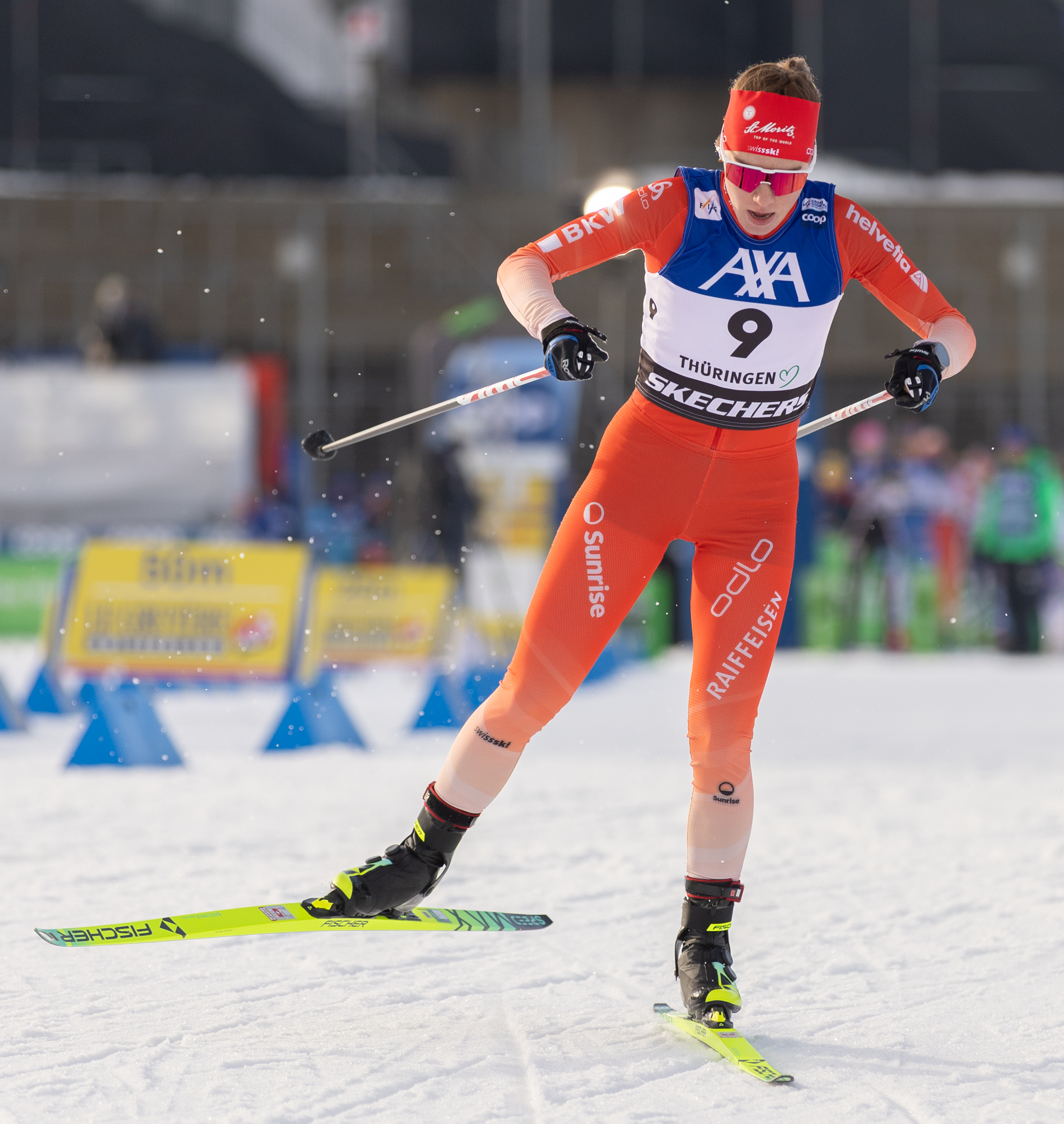

Personal information
- Nationality: Switzerland
- Born: 20 April 2001 (age 25) St. Moritz, Switzerland

Sport
- Sport: Skiing
- Club: SC Alpina St. Moritz

World Cup career
- Seasons: 2 – (2022–present)
- Indiv. starts: 12
- Indiv. podiums: 0
- Team starts: 0
- Overall titles: 0 – (91st in 2022)
- Discipline titles: 0
Medal record
Women's cross-country skiing
Representing Switzerland
Olympic Games
Silver medal – second place	2026 Milano Cortina	Team sprint
Bronze medal – third place	2026 Milano Cortina	50 km classical
U23 World Championships
Silver medal – second place	2024 Planica	10 km classical
Bronze medal – third place	2023 Whistler	4 × 5 km mixed relay
Junior World Championships
Gold medal – first place	2020 Oberwiesenthal	4 × 3.33 km relay
- Updated on 27 March 2023

Nadja Kälin (born 20 April 2001) is a Swiss cross-country skier. She competed in the Women's 10 kilometre classical, and Women's 15 kilometre skiathlon, at the 2022 Winter Olympics. She competed in the 2021–22 FIS Cross-Country World Cup.

Kälin placed fourth in 20 kilometre skiathlon at the 2026 Winter Olympics.

Kälin won the bronze medal in the 50 km classical race at the 2026 Winter Olympics.

== Cross-country skiing results ==
All results are sourced from the International Ski Federation (FIS).

=== Olympic Games ===
Year	Age	Individual	Skiathlon	Mass start	Sprint	Relay	Team sprint
2022	20	43	21	—	—	7	—
2026	24	14	4	Bronze	—	7	Silver

=== World Championships ===
Year	Age	10 km individual	15 km skiathlon	30 km mass start	Sprint	4 × 5 km relay	Team sprint
2023	21	DNS	32	—	—	—	—

=== World Cup ===
==== Season standings ====
Season	Age	Discipline standings				Ski Tour standings
Season	Age	Overall	Distance	Sprint	U23	Tour de Ski
2022	20	91	58	NC	16	DNF
2023	21	118	82	NC	27	DNF
