= 2026 Nordic Junior World Ski Championships =

International skiing competition

2026 FIS Nordic Junior World Ski Championships
- Location: Lillehammer, Norway
- Date: 2–8 March 2026

The 2026 FIS Nordic Junior World Ski Championships were held from 2 to 8 March 2026 in Lillehammer, Norway.

== Schedule ==
All times are local (UTC+1)

Cross-country

Date	Time	Event
2 March	10:00	Women's junior sprint freestyle Men's junior sprint freestyle
3 March	10:00	Women's U23 sprint freestyle Men's U23 sprint freestyle
4 March	10:00	Women's junior 20 km mass start freestyle
4 March	12:30	Men's junior 20 km mass start freestyle
5 March	10:00	Women's U23 20 km mass start freestyle
5 March	12:30	Men's U23 20 km mass start freestyle
6 March	09:30	Men's junior 10 km classical
6 March	12:30	Women's junior 10 km classical
7 March	09:30	Men's U23 10 km classical
7 March	12:30	Women's U23 10 km classical
8 March	09:30	Mixed junior 4 x 5 km relay
8 March	12:00	Mixed U23 4 x 5 km relay

Nordic combined

Date	Time	Event
4 March	09:45; 15:00	Women's team sprint HS98 / 2 x 4.5 km
4 March	11:30; 16:00	Men's team sprint HS98 / 2 x 7.5 km
6 March	09:30; 15:00	Women's HS98 / 5 km
6 March	10:15; 15:45	Men's HS98 / 10 km
7 March	10:00; 15:00	Mixed team HS98 / 5+2.5+2.5+5 km

Ski jumping

Date	Time	Event
4 March	13:30	Women's HS98
5 March	16:45	Men's HS98
6 March	16:30	Women's team HS98
7 March	12:30	Men's team HS98
8 March	10:00	Mixed team HS98

== Medal summary ==
=== Junior events ===
==== Cross-country skiing ====
Event	Gold		Silver		Bronze	
Men's Junior Events
Sprint freestyle	Eddie Pettersson; Sweden	2:46.55	Leopold Strand; Norway	2:46.61	Federico Pozzi; Italy	2:47.72
10 kilometre classical	Leopold Strand; Norway	23:33.7	Daniel Pedranzini; Italy	24:03.3	Torjus Magnus Harbo; Norway	24:05.9
20 kilometre mass start freestyle	Emil August Longva; Norway	44:07.6	Marco Pinzani; Italy	44:09.4	Anton Kemppi; Finland	44:10.8
Women's Junior Events
Sprint freestyle	Heidi Bucher; Austria	3:08.61	Iselin Bjervig Drivenes; Norway	3:09.46	Eline Skaar; Norway	3:09.63
10 kilometre classical	Ingrid Wollan Benum; Norway	27:23.6	Heidi Bucher; Austria	27:52.2	Tove Norgren; Sweden	27:58.9
20 kilometre mass start freestyle	Julie Sand-Hanssen; Norway	52:31.6	Luisa Dahlke; Germany	52:32.4	Heidi Bucher; Austria	52:37.7
Mixed Junior Events
4 x 5 kilometre relay	Norway Torjus Magnus Harbo; Ingrid Wollan Benum; Leopold Strand; Julie Sand-Hanssen	49:46.8	France Gaspard Cottaz; Annette Coupat; Mario Perrillat-Collomb; Agathe Margreither	49:47.1	Italy Marco Pinzani; Caterina Milani; Daniel Pedranzini; Vanessa Cagnati	50:02.9

==== Nordic combined ====
Event	Gold		Silver		Bronze	
Men's Junior Events
Individual normal hill/10 km	Lukáš Doležal; Czech Republic	23:30.4	Lubin Martin; France	23:37.0	Sverre Kumar Lundeby; Norway	23:43.0
Team sprint normal hill/2 × 7.5 km	Austria David Thür; Andreas Gfrerer	30:43.2	Germany Jonathan Gräbert; Felix Brieden	31:06.1	Norway Henrik Elias Wikstrøm Hilmarsen; Alvin Le	31:16.4
Women's Junior Events
Individual normal hill/5 km	Katharina Gruber; Austria	14:00.8	Yuzuki Kainuma; Japan	14:11.4	Teja Pavec; Slovenia	14:14.2
Team sprint normal hill/2 × 4.5 km	Slovenia Tia Malovrh; Teja Pavec	21:43.2	Japan Yuzuka Fujiwara; Yuzuki Kainuma	22:15.7	Italy Giada Delugan; Ludovica Del Bianco	22:38.5
Mixed Junior Events
Team normal hill/5+2.5+2.5+5 km	Austria David Thür; Katharina Gruber; Eva-Maria Holzer; Andreas Gfrerer	38:08.6	Germany Jonathan Gräbert; Maja Loh; Sofia Eggensberger; Felix Brieden	38:38.3	Norway Alvin Le; Nora Helene Evans; Ingrid Græsli; Sverre Kumar Lundeby	39:03.0

==== Ski jumping ====
Event	Gold		Silver		Bronze	
Men's Junior Events
Individual normal hill	Stephan Embacher; Austria	296.5	Kacper Tomasiak; Poland	287.3	Jason Colby; United States	276.0
Team normal hill	Austria Thomas Gfrerer; Julian Auinger; Nikolaus Humml; Lukas Haagen	1047.9	Germany Alex Reiter; Lasse Deimel; Yann Kullmann; Janne Holz	1034.4	Norway Leonard Fageraas; Odd Harald Svenningsen-Fjeld; Jakob Alvsåker Walseth; Oddvar Gunnerød	989.2
Women's Junior Events
Individual normal hill	Anežka Indráčková; Czech Republic	236.2	Ingvild Synnøve Midtskogen; Norway	233.9	Sofia Mattila; Finland	229.7
Team normal hill	Slovenia Taja Terbovšek; Ajda Košnjek; Izadora Kopač; Maja Kovačič	955.2	Austria Sara Pokorny; Meghann Wadsak; Pia Stütz; Luise Tritscher Germany Anna-Fay Scharfenberg; Emily Teubner; Megi Lou Schmidt; Julina Kreibich	919.5	Not awarded	
Mixed Junior Events
Team normal hill	Slovenia Taja Terbovšek; Jaka Kramer; Maja Kovačič; Enej Faletič	977.9	Austria Sara Pokorny; Nikolaus Humml; Luise Tritscher; Lukas Haagen	953.2	Germany Anna-Fay Scharfenberg; Yann Kullmann; Julina Kreibich; Lasse Deimel	936.0

=== U23 events ===
==== Cross-country skiing ====
Event	Gold		Silver		Bronze	
Men's U23 Events
Sprint freestyle	Filip Skari; Norway	2:33.20	Elias Keck; Germany	2:34.31	Roman Alder; Switzerland	2:35.70
10 kilometre classical	Niko Anttola; Finland	24:23.0	Casper Kvam Grindhagen; Norway	24:53.8	Anton Grahn; Sweden	25:02.2
20 kilometre mass start freestyle	Elias Keck; Germany	43:32.5	Savelii Korostelev; Individual Neutral Athletes	43:32.8	Xavier McKeever; Canada	43:33.1
Women's U23 Events
Sprint freestyle	Elin Henriksson; Sweden	2:58.01	Mina Kjærås Moland; Norway	2:58.21	Helene Ekrheim Haugen; Norway	2:58.85
10 kilometre classical	Eva Ingebrigtsen; Norway	28:43.2	Marina Kälin; Switzerland	29:16.0	Léonie Perry; France	29:46.8
20 kilometre mass start freestyle	Alison Mackie; Canada	49:41.0	Eva Ingebrigtsen; Norway	49:41.7	Léonie Perry; France	49:42.1
Mixed U23 Events
4 x 5 kilometre relay	France Milhan Laissus; Léonie Perry; Mathieu Blanc; Margot Tirloy	49:56.9	Norway Casper Kvam Grindhagen; Eva Ingebrigtsen; Lars Michael Saab Bjærtnes; Oline Vestad	49:58.6	Finland Eero Rantala; Selene Rossi; Niko Anttola; Elsa Torvinen	50:12.2

=== Medal tables ===
==== All events ====
* Host nation (Norway)

Rank	Nation	Gold	Silver	Bronze	Total
1	Norway*	7	7	7	21
2	Austria	6	3	1	10
3	Slovenia	3	0	1	4
4	Sweden	2	0	2	4
5	Czech Republic	2	0	0	2
6	Germany	1	6	1	8
7	France	1	2	2	5
8	Finland	1	0	3	4
9	Canada	1	0	1	2
10	Italy	0	2	3	5
11	Japan	0	2	0	2
12	Switzerland	0	1	1	2
13	Individual Neutral Athletes	0	1	0	1
13	Poland	0	1	0	1
15	United States	0	0	1	1
Totals (15 entries)		24	25	23	72

==== Junior events ====
* Host nation (Norway)

Rank	Nation	Gold	Silver	Bronze	Total
1	Austria	6	3	1	10
2	Norway*	5	3	6	14
3	Slovenia	3	0	1	4
4	Czech Republic	2	0	0	2
5	Sweden	1	0	1	2
6	Germany	0	5	1	6
7	Italy	0	2	3	5
8	France	0	2	0	2
8	Japan	0	2	0	2
10	Poland	0	1	0	1
11	Finland	0	0	2	2
12	United States	0	0	1	1
Totals (12 entries)		17	18	16	51

==== U23 events ====
* Host nation (Norway)

Rank	Nation	Gold	Silver	Bronze	Total
1	Norway*	2	4	1	7
2	Germany	1	1	0	2
3	France	1	0	2	3
4	Canada	1	0	1	2
4	Finland	1	0	1	2
4	Sweden	1	0	1	2
7	Switzerland	0	1	1	2
8	Individual Neutral Athletes	0	1	0	1
Totals (8 entries)		7	7	7	21
