= Juliette Pelchat =

Canadian snowboarder (born 2004)

Personal information
- Born: December 4, 2004 (age 21) Squamish, British Columbia, Canada
- Home town: Whistler, British Columbia, Canada

Sport
- Country: Canada
- Sport: Snowboarding

Juliette Pelchat (born December 4, 2004) is a Canadian snowboarder. She represented Canada at the 2026 Winter Olympics.

== Career ==
In January 2026, she was selected to represent Canada at the 2026 Winter Olympics. During the slopestyle qualification she scored 68.25 points and advanced to the finals. During the final she finished in ninth place with a score of 51.76.

== Personal life ==
Pelchat's father, JF, is a former professional snowboarder.
