= Sonjaa Schmidt =

Canadian cross-country skier (born 2002)

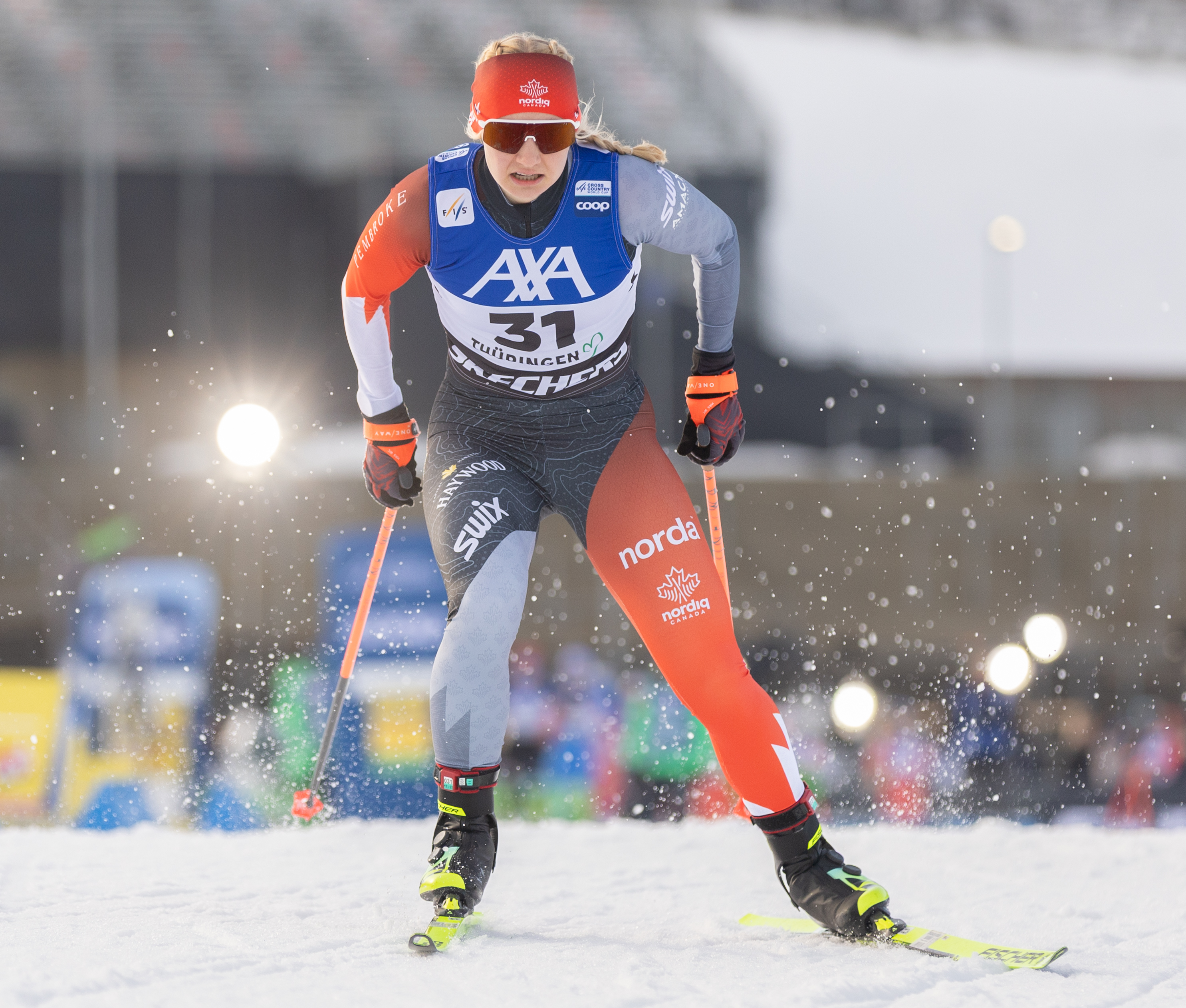

Personal information
- Nationality: Canada
- Born: December 15, 2002 (age 23) Whitehorse, Yukon, Canada

Sport
- Sport: Skiing
Medal record
FIS Nordic Junior World Ski Championships
Gold medal – first place	2024 Planica	Women's U23 Sprint freestyle
- Updated on December 20, 2025

Sonjaa Schmidt (born December 15, 2002) is a Canadian cross-country skier. Schmidt became the first Canadian women to ever win a gold medal at the Nordic Junior World Ski Championships.

== Career ==
Schmidt broke onto the international stage by winning the gold medal in the women's U23 individual sprint freestyle at the 2024 Nordic Junior World Ski Championships in Planica, Slovenia. By doing so, Schmidt became the first Canadian woman ever to win a gold medal at the Nordic Junior World Ski Championships. In the next season, Schmidt took part in the senior Cross-Country World Cup, where she finished fourth in the women's individual sprint at the Engadin stop.

At the 2025 Canadian Olympic trials in Vernon, British Columbia, Schmidt won both distance races, clinching her spot on Canada's 2026 Olympic team. On December 19, 2025, Schmidt was officially named to Canada's 2026 Olympic team.
