= Rémi Drolet =

Canadian cross-country skier (born 2000)

Personal information
- Nationality: Canada
- Born: 31 August 2000 (age 26) Trail, British Columbia, Canada

Sport
- Sport: Skiing
- Club: Black Jack Cross Country SC

World Cup career
- Seasons: 4 – (2019, 2021–present)
- Indiv. starts: 19
- Indiv. podiums: 0
- Team starts: 0
- Overall titles: 0
- Discipline titles: 0
Medal record
Men's cross-country skiing
Representing Canada
Junior World Championships
Silver medal – second place	2020 Oberwiesenthal	4 × 5 km relay
- Updated on 29 March 2023

Rémi Drolet (born 31 August 2000) is a Canadian cross-country skier.

== Early life ==
Rémi Drolet was born in Trail, British Columbia. He started cross-country skiing at age 4, but didn't practice it regularly until he was 11. He graduated from Harvard University with a concentration in physics and math in 2024. While at Harvard, Drolet was inducted into Phi Beta Kappa.

== Career ==
=== Junior ===
At the 2020 Nordic Junior World Ski Championships in Oberwiesenthal, Germany, Drolet was part of the quartet that won silver in the 4 × 5 kilometre relay event, becoming the first Canadians to win a relay medal at the event. Drolet would follow that up with a fourth-place finish in the 30 km event.

=== Senior ===
Drolet competed at the FIS Nordic World Ski Championships 2021, with his top finish coming in the 4 × 10 kilometre relay, where he finished 10th.

On January 21, 2022, Drolet was officially named to Canada's 2022 Olympic team after Canada was awarded an additional berth. On December 19, 2025, Drolet was named to Canada's 2026 Olympic Team. Drolet made the team with his sister Jasmine.

== Cross-country skiing results ==
All results are sourced from the International Ski Federation (FIS).

=== Olympic Games ===
Year	Age	Individual	Skiathlon	Mass Start	Sprint	Relay	Team Sprint
2022	21	33	55	35^{[a]}	—	11	—
2026	25	19	42	-	56	-	—

^{a} Distance reduced to 30 km due to weather conditions.

=== World Championships ===
Year	Age	15 km individual	30 km skiathlon	50 km mass start	Sprint	4 × 10 km relay	Team sprint
2021	20	52	39	31	56	10	—

=== World Cup ===
==== Season standings ====
Season	Age	Discipline standings				Ski Tour standings		
Season	Age	Overall	Distance	Sprint	U23	Nordic Opening	Tour de Ski	World Cup Final
2019	18	NC	NC	NC	NC	—	—	51
2021	20	NC	NC	—	NC	—	—	—N/a
2022	21	NC	NC	NC	NC	—N/a	—	—N/a
2023	22	NC	NC	NC	NC	—N/a	53	—N/a
