= Amelia Wells =

Canadian cross-country skier (born 2002)

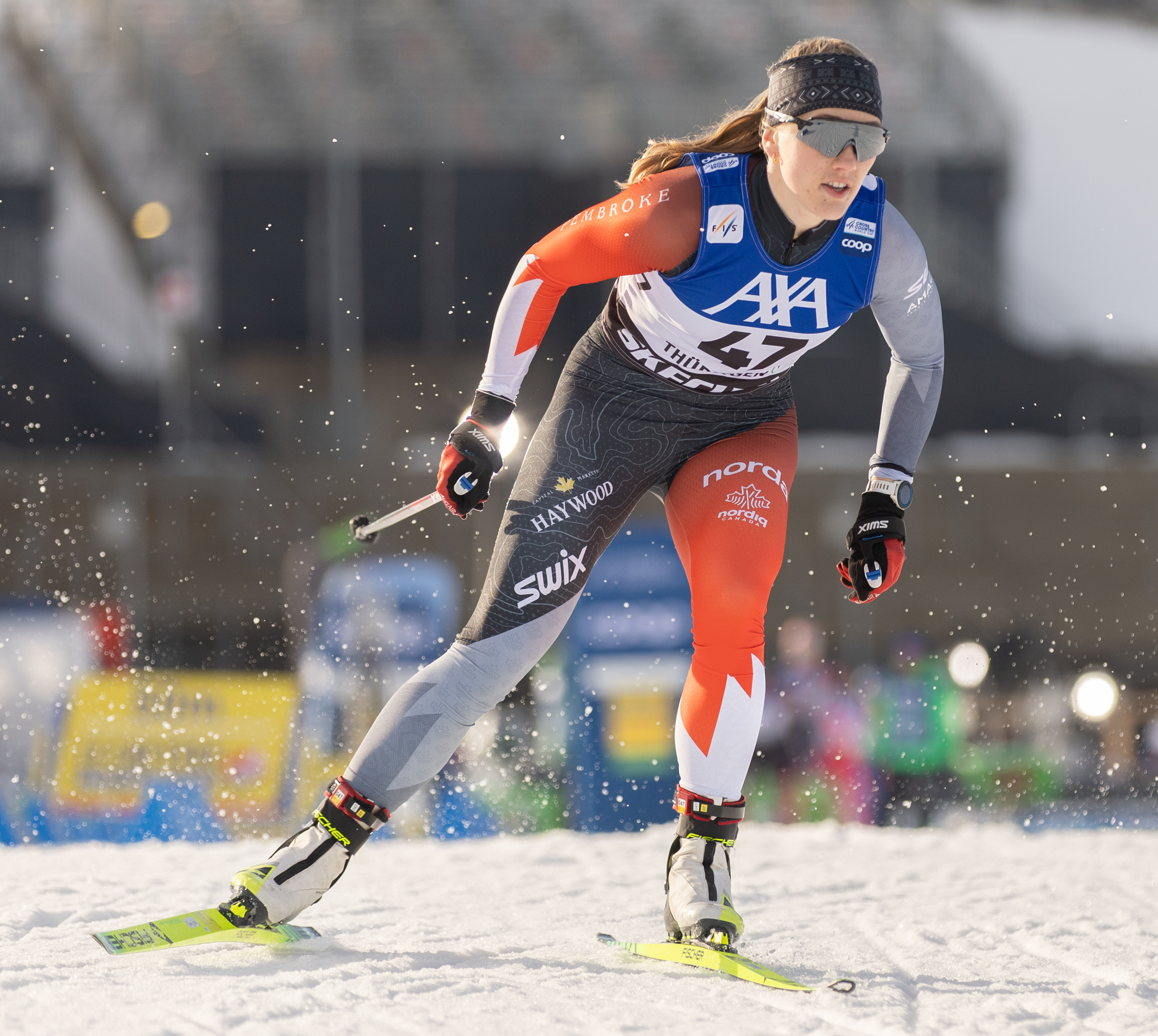

Personal information
- Nationality: Canada
- Born: June 6, 2002 (age 24) Victoria, British Columbia, Canada

Sport
- Sport: Skiing
- Updated on December 21, 2025

Amelia Wells (born June 6, 2002) is a Canadian cross-country skier.

== Career ==
Wells qualified to compete for Canada at three FIS Nordic Junior World Ski Championships. Wells became the first cross-country skier from Vancouver Island to compete in the FIS Cross-Country World Cup.

In April 2025, Wells won two gold medals at the Canadian Nationals to close out the season. On December 19, 2025, Wells was officially named to Canada's 2026 Olympic team.

== Personal life ==
Wells trained at the National Training Center in Canmore, Alberta, while pursuing her degree at the University of Calgary.
