= Xavier McKeever =

Canadian cross-country skier (born 2003)

Personal information
- Nationality: Canada
- Born: August 14, 2003 (age 22) Canmore, Alberta, Canada

Sport
- Sport: Skiing
- Club: Foothils Nordic
Medal record
Men's cross-country skiing
Representing Canada
World U23 Championships
Bronze medal – third place	2026 Lillehammer	20 km freestyle
World Junior Championships
Silver medal – second place	2020 Oberwiesenthal	4 × 5 km relay
- Updated on January 21, 2026

Xavier McKeever (born August 14, 2003) is a Canadian cross-country skier. McKeever started skiing at a young age, as both of his parents were also cross-country skiers.

== Career ==
McKeever competed at the 2020 Nordic Junior World Ski Championships in Germany, and was part of the silver medal winning junior men's relay in the junior division. McKeever followed this up with three top ten placements at the 2022 Nordic Junior World Ski Championships. However McKeever skipped the 2024 edition of the World Juniors to compete at the Canmore stop of the Senior World Cup, which was held in his hometown. McKeever has competed at two Senior Nordic World Championships, in 2023 and 2025. In December 2025, McKeever won the sprint event of the Canadian trials. With the win, McKeever secured his spot on Canada's 2026 Olympic team. On December 19, 2025, McKeever was officially named to Canada's 2026 Olympic team.

=== World Championships ===
Year	Age	15 km individual	Skiathlon	50 km mass start	Sprint	Relay	Team sprint
2023	20	60	44	—	35	5	—
2025	22	—	45	—	51	5	—

== Personal life ==
McKeever's parents are Milaine Theriault and Robin McKeever, who both competed for Canada as Olympic cross-country skiers. Meanwhile, McKeever’s uncle, Brian McKeever, is Canada’s most decorated Winter Paralympian.
