= Jasmine Drolet =

Canadian cross-country skier (born 2002)

Personal information
- Nationality: Canada
- Born: July 20, 2002 (age 24) Trail, British Columbia, Canada

Sport
- Sport: Skiing
Medal record
World Junior Championships
Gold medal – first place	2024 Planica	Mixed U23 4 × 5 Km relay
- Updated on December 24, 2025

Jasmine Drolet (born July 20, 2002) is a Canadian cross-country skier.

== Career ==
Drolet first represented Canada on the international stage at the 2020 Winter Youth Olympics in Lausanne, Switzerland. Drolet was part of the gold medal-winning team in the mixed U23 4 × 5 km relay at the 2024 Nordic Junior World Ski Championships in Planica, Slovenia.

On December 19, 2025, Drolet was officially named to Canada's 2026 Olympic team. Drolet made the team with her brother Rémi.

== Personal life ==
Drolet is an alumnus of Dartmouth College, where she was a member of Sigma Delta sorority.
