= 2017 in ice sports =

== Bandy ==
=== World Championship ===
- January 29 – February 5: 2017 Bandy World Championship in Sandviken
  - Division A: Sweden defeated Russia, 4–3, to win their twelfth overall Bandy World Championship title. Finland took the bronze medal.
  - Division B: Canada defeated Hungary, 4–3, in the final, and is qualified for Division A next year, replacing Belarus. Mongolia took third place.

=== Youth Bandy World Championships ===
- January (TBC): 2017 Bandy World Championship Y-19 in Syktyvkar Champions: Russia
- February 2 – 4: 2017 Bandy World Championship Y-17 in (Finland) Varkaus Champions: Russia
- February 24 – 26: 2017 Bandy World Championship G-17 in (Russia) Irkutsk Champions: Sweden

=== World Cup ===
- Final game, 2016 Bandy World Cup, October 16: Västerås SK (Sweden) - Villa Lidköping BK (Sweden), 4–1

=== World Cup Women ===
- Final game, 2016 Bandy World Cup Women, October 30: Rekord Irkutsk (Russia) - Hammarby IF (Sweden), 4-1

=== National champions ===
- Finland: Veiterä (men), Sudet (women)
- Norway: Stabæk IF (men), Stabæk IF (women)
- Russia: SKA-Neftyanik Khabarovsk (men), Rekord Irkutsk (women)
- Sweden: Edsbyns IF (men), Kareby IS (women)
- United States: Dinkytown Dukes (men)

== Bobsleigh and Skeleton ==
=== International Bobsleigh and Skeleton events ===
- January 9 – 15: 2017 IBSF European Championship in Winterberg
  - Two-man bobsleigh winners: Germany (Francesco Friedrich & Thorsten Margis)
  - Four-man bobsleigh winners: Germany (Johannes Lochner, Sebastian Mrowka, Joshua Bluhm, & Christian Rasp)
  - Women's bobsleigh winners: Germany (Mariama Jamanka & Annika Drazek)
  - Skeleton winners: (Latvia) Martins Dukurs (m) / (Germany) Jacqueline Lölling (f)
- January 24 – 28: 2017 IBSF Junior Skeleton World Championships in (Latvia) Sigulda
  - Junior Skeleton winners: (Russia) Nikita Tregubov (m) / (Russia) Yulia Kanakina (f)
- January 27 – 29: 2017 IBSF Junior Bobsleigh World Championships in Winterberg
  - Junior Two-man bobsleigh winners: Germany (Richard Oelsner & Alexander Schüeller)
  - Junior Four-man bobsleigh winners: Germany (Bennet Buchmueller, Benedikt Hertel, Niklas Scherer, & Costa Tonga Laurenz)
  - Junior Women's bobsleigh winners: Great Britain (Mica McNeill & Mica Moore)
- January 29 – February 5: 2017 IBSF Para-Sport World Championships in (Switzerland) St. Moritz
  - Seated Para-bobsleigh winner: (Latvia) Arturs Klots
- February 13 – 26: IBSF World Championships 2017 in Schönau am Königsee
  - Note 1: This event was supposed to be hosted in Sochi, but the IBSF took it back, due to the release of the McLaren Report.
  - Note 2: There was a tie for first place in the four-man bobsleigh event here.
  - Two-man bobsleigh winners: Germany (Francesco Friedrich & Thorsten Margis)
  - Four-man bobsleigh #1 winners: Germany (Johannes Lochner, Matthias Kagerhuber, Joshua Bluhm, & Christian Rasp)
  - Four-man bobsleigh #2 winners: Germany (Francesco Friedrich, Candy Bauer, Martin Grothkopp, & Thorsten Margis)
  - Women's bobsleigh winners: United States (Elana Meyers & Kehri Jones)
  - Skeleton winners: (Latvia) Martins Dukurs (m) / (Germany) Jacqueline Lölling (f)
  - Team winners: Germany (Axel Jungk, Mariama Jamanka, Franziska Bertels, Jacqueline Lölling, Johannes Lochner, & Christian Rasp)

=== 2016–17 Bobsleigh and Skeleton World Cup ===
- November 28, 2016 – December 3, 2016: #1 in Whistler, British Columbia
  - Two-man bobsleigh winners: Germany (Francesco Friedrich & Thorsten Margis)
  - Four-man bobsleigh winners: Russia (Alexander Kasjanov, Alexey Zaitsev, Aleksei Pushkarev, & Maxim Belugin)
  - Women's bobsleigh winners: Canada (Kaillie Humphries & Cynthia Appiah)
  - Skeleton winners: (South Korea) Yun Sung-bin (m) / (Canada) Elisabeth Vathje (f)
- December 12 – 17, 2016: #2 in Lake Placid, New York
  - Two-man bobsleigh winners: United States (Steven Holcomb & Sam McGuffie)
  - Four-man bobsleigh winners: Switzerland (Rico Peter, Janne Bror van der Zijde, Simon Friedli, & Thomas Amrhein)
  - Women's bobsleigh winners: United States (Jamie Greubel & Aja Evans)
  - Skeleton winners: (Russia) Aleksandr Tretyakov (m) / (Austria) Janine Flock (f)
- January 2 – 8: #3 in Altenberg, Saxony
  - Two-man bobsleigh winners: Germany (Francesco Friedrich & Martin Grothkopp)
  - Four-man bobsleigh winners: Germany (Johannes Lochner, Sebastian Mrowka, Joshua Bluhm, & Christian Rasp)
  - Women's bobsleigh winners: Canada (Kaillie Humphries & Melissa Lotholz)
  - Skeleton winners: (Germany) Christopher Grotheer (m) / (Germany) Jacqueline Lölling (f)
- January 9 – 15: #4 in Winterberg
  - Two-man bobsleigh winners: Germany (Francesco Friedrich & Thorsten Margis)
  - Four-man bobsleigh winners: Germany (Johannes Lochner, Sebastian Mrowka, Joshua Bluhm, & Christian Rasp)
  - Women's bobsleigh winners: United States (Elana Meyers & Kehri Jones)
  - Skeleton winners: (Latvia) Martins Dukurs (m) / (Canada) Elisabeth Vathje (f)
- January 16 – 22: #5 in (Switzerland) St. Moritz
  - Two-man bobsleigh winners: Germany (Johannes Lochner & Christian Rasp)
  - Four-man bobsleigh winners: Latvia (Oskars Ķibermanis, Jānis Jansons, Matiss Miknis, & Raivis Zirups)
  - Women's bobsleigh winners: United States (Elana Meyers & Briauna Jones)
  - Skeleton winners: (Latvia) Martins Dukurs (m) / (Canada) Mirela Rahneva (f)
- January 23 – 29: #6 in Schönau am Königsee
  - Two-man bobsleigh winners: Germany (Johannes Lochner & Joshua Bluhm)
  - Four-man bobsleigh winners: Germany (Johannes Lochner, Matthias Kagerhuber, Joshua Bluhm, & Christian Rasp)
  - Women's bobsleigh winners: United States (Elana Meyers & Kehri Jones)
  - Skeleton winners: (Russia) Aleksandr Tretyakov (m) / (Germany) Jacqueline Lölling (f)
- January 30 – February 5: #7 in (Austria) Innsbruck (Igls)
  - Two-man bobsleigh winners: Germany (Francesco Friedrich & Thorsten Margis)
  - Four-man bobsleigh winners: Latvia (Oskars Melbārdis, Daumants Dreiškens, Arvis Vilkaste, & Jānis Strenga)
  - Women's bobsleigh winners: United States (Elana Meyers & Lolo Jones)
  - Skeleton winners: (Latvia) Martins Dukurs (m) / (Germany) Tina Hermann (f)
- March 13 – 19: #8 (final) in (South Korea) Pyeongchang
  - Two-man bobsleigh winners: Germany (Francesco Friedrich & Thorsten Margis)
  - Four-man bobsleigh winners: Russia (Alexander Kasjanov, Aleksei Pushkarev, Vasilij Kondratenko, & Alexey Zaitsev)
  - Women's bobsleigh winners: United States (Jamie Greubel & Aja Evans)
  - Skeleton winners: (Latvia) Martins Dukurs (m) / (Germany) Jacqueline Lölling (f)

=== 2016–17 IBSF Para-Sport World Cup ===
- November 15 – 23, 2016: Para-Sport World Cup #1 in (United States) Park City
  - Seated Para-bobsleigh winners: (Canada) Brian McPherson (#1) / (Canada) Lonnie Bissonnette (#2)
  - Para-skeleton winners: (United Kingdom) Matthew Richardson (#1) / (United States) Eric Eierdam (#2)
- January 15 – 21: Para-Sport World Cup #2 in (Norway) Lillehammer
  - Seated Para-bobsleigh winners: (United States) Barry Schroeder (#1) / (Latvia) Alvils Brants (#2)
  - Para-skeleton winner: (United States) Eric Eierdam
- January 23 – 28: Para-Sport World Cup #3 (final) in (Germany) Oberhof
  - Seated Para-bobsleigh winner: (Latvia) Arturs Klots (2 times)

=== 2016–17 IBSF Intercontinental Cup ===
- November 6 – 11, 2016: IBSF Intercontinental Cup #1 in (Austria) Innsbruck (Igls)
  - Skeleton winners: (Germany) Kilian von Schleinitz (m; 2 times) / (Netherlands) Kimberley Bos (f; 2 times)
- November 13 – 18, 2016: IBSF Intercontinental Cup #2 in (Germany) Schönau am Königsee
  - Skeleton winners: (Germany) Kilian von Schleinitz (m; 2 times) / (Germany) Anna Fernstaedt (f; 2 times)
- January 9 – 13: IBSF Intercontinental Cup #3 in (Canada) Calgary
  - Men's skeleton winners: (Russia) Egor Veselov (#1) / (Russia) Pavel Kulikov (#2)
  - Women's skeleton winner: (Canada) Lanette Prediger (2 times)
- January 22 – 27: IBSF Intercontinental Cup #4 (final) in (United States) Lake Placid, New York
  - Men's skeleton winners: (United States) John Daly (#1) / (Russia) Egor Veselov (#2)
  - Women's skeleton winner: (United States) Savannah Graybill (2 times)

=== 2016-17 IBSF European Cup ===
- October 31 – November 6, 2016: IBSF European Cup #1 in Sigulda
  - Two-man bobsleigh winners #1: Latvia (Oskars Ķibermanis & Matiss Miknis)
  - Two-man bobsleigh winners #2: Latvia (Oskars Ķibermanis & Jānis Jansons)
  - Women's bobsleigh winners #1: Belgium (Elfje Willemsen & Sophie Vercruyssen)
  - Women's bobsleigh winners #2: Belgium (Elfje Willemsen & Sara Aerts)
  - Skeleton winners: (Latvia) Ivo Steinbergs (m) / (Germany) Anna Fernstaedt (f)
- November 6 – 11, 2016: IBSF European Cup #2 in (Austria) Igls
  - Skeleton winners: (Germany) Fabian Kuechler (m; 2 times) / (Germany) Tamara Seer (f; 2 times)
- November 10 – December 4, 2016: IBSF European Cup #3 in Schönau am Königsee
  - Two-man bobsleigh winners #1: Germany (Johannes Lochner & Joshua Bluhm)
  - Two-man bobsleigh winners #2: Germany (Richard Oelsner & Alexander Schueller)
  - Four-man bobsleigh winners: Germany (#1); Russia (#2); Germany (#3)
  - Women's bobsleigh winners #1: Belgium (Elfje Willemsen & Sophie Vercruyssen)
  - Women's bobsleigh winners #2: Japan (Maria Oshigiri & Arisa Kimishima)
  - Women's bobsleigh winners #3: Switzerland (Sabina Hafner & Eveline Rebsamen)
  - Skeleton #1 winners: (Germany) Felix Seibel (m) / (Germany) Maxi Just (f)
  - Skeleton #2 winners: (Germany) Dominic Rady (m) / (Germany) Tamara Seer (f)
- December 12 – 18, 2016: IBSF European Cup #3 in Altenberg, Saxony
  - Two-man bobsleigh winners #1: Germany (Richard Oelsner & Alexander Schueller)
  - Two-man bobsleigh winners #2: Latvia (Oskars Ķibermanis & Daumants Dreiškens)
  - Four-man bobsleigh winners: Germany
  - Women's bobsleigh winners: Belgium (Elfje Willemsen & Sophie Vercruyssen)
- January 8 – 15: IBSF European Cup #4 in St. Moritz
  - Two-man bobsleigh winners: Latvia (Oskars Melbārdis & Daumants Dreiškens)
  - Four-man bobsleigh winners: Latvia (2 times)
  - Women's bobsleigh winners: Switzerland (Sabina Hafner & Jasmin Naef)
  - Skeleton winners: (Germany) Felix Keisinger (m) / (Germany) Maxi Just (f)
- January 15 – 20: IBSF European Cup #5 in (Germany) Altenberg, Saxony
  - Skeleton winners: (Germany) Dominic Rady (m; 2 times) / (Germany) Tamara Seer (f; 2 times)
- January 22 – 29: IBSF European Cup #6 (final) in Winterberg
  - Two-man bobsleigh winners: Germany (Richard Oelsner & Marc Rademacher)
  - Four-man bobsleigh winners: Russia (2 times)
  - Women's bobsleigh winners: Great Britain (Mica McNeill & Montell Douglas)

=== 2016-17 IBSF North American Cup ===
- November 6 – 14, 2016: IBSF North American Cup #1 in Calgary
  - Two-man bobsleigh #1 winners: United States (Nick Cunningham & Nathan Gilsleider)
  - Two-man bobsleigh #2 winners: South Korea (Kim Dong-hyun & Jun Jung-lin)
  - Four-man bobsleigh winners: Canada (2 times)
  - Women's bobsleigh #1 winners: Canada (Kaillie Humphries & Cynthia Appiah)
  - Women's bobsleigh #2 winners: Canada (Alysia Rissling & Catherine Medeiros)
  - Skeleton #1 winners: (Spain) Ander Mirambell (m; 2 times) / (Canada) Madison Charney (f)
  - Women's Skeleton #2 winner: (South Korea) MUN Ra-young
- November 16 – 26, 2016: IBSF North American Cup #2 in Whistler, British Columbia
  - Two-man bobsleigh #1 winners: Russia (Alexander Kasjanov & Aleksei Pushkarev)
  - Two-man bobsleigh #2 winners: Canada (Nick Poloniato & Timothy Randall)
  - Four-man bobsleigh winners: Russia (2 times)
  - Women's bobsleigh winners: Canada (Alysia Rissling & Genevieve Thibault) (2 times)
  - Skeleton #1 winners: (Japan) Katsuyuki Miyajima (m) / (Canada) Mirela Rahneva (f)
  - Skeleton #2 winners: (Russia) Egor Veselov (m) / (Netherlands) Kimberley Bos (f)
- January 1 – 12: IBSF North American Cup #3 in Park City
  - Two-man bobsleigh #1 winners: Canada (Taylor Austin & Lascelles Brown)
  - Two-man bobsleigh #2 winners: United States (Nick Cunningham & Ryan Bailey)
  - Four-man bobsleigh winners: Brazil (#1) / United States (#2)
  - Women's bobsleigh #1 winners: South Korea (LEE Seon-hye & SHIN Mi-ran)
  - Women's bobsleigh #2 winners: South Korea (KIM Yoo-ran & KIM Min-seong)
  - Skeleton winners: (United States) John Daly (m; 2 times) / (United Kingdom) Madelaine Smith (f; 2 times)
- January 15 – 27: IBSF North American Cup #4 (final) in Lake Placid, New York
  - Two-man bobsleigh #1 winners: United States (Nick Cunningham & Nathan Gilsleider)
  - Two-man bobsleigh #2 winners: United States (Nick Cunningham & Hakeem Abdul-Saboor)
  - Four-man bobsleigh winners: Brazil (#1) / United States (#2)
  - Women's bobsleigh #1 winners: South Korea (KIM Yoo-ran & KIM Min-seong)
  - Women's bobsleigh #2 winners: United States (Nicole Vogt & Bonnie Kilis)
  - Skeleton #1 winners: (Russia) Pavel Kulikov (m) / (United Kingdom) Donna Creighton (f)
  - Skeleton #2 winners: (United States) John Daly (m) / (South Korea) MUN Ra-young (f)

== Curling ==
=== 2016–17 International curling championships ===
- October 14 – 22, 2016: 2016 World Mixed Curling Championship in Kazan
  - Russia (Skip: Alexander Krushelnitskiy) defeated Sweden (Skip: Kristian Lindström), 5–4, to win Russia's first World Mixed Curling Championship title.
  - Scotland (Skip: Cameron Bryce) took the bronze medal.
- November 5 – 12, 2016: 2016 Pacific-Asia Curling Championships in Uiseong
  - Men: Japan (Skip: Yusuke Morozumi) defeated China (Skip: Liu Rui), 5–3, to win Japan's third Men's Pacific-Asia Curling Championships title.
    - South Korea (Skip: Kim Soo-hyuk) took the bronze medal.
  - Women: South Korea (Skip: Kim Eun-jung) defeated China (Skip: Wang Bingyu), 5–3, to win South Korea's fourth Women's Pacific-Asia Curling Championships title.
    - Japan (Skip: Satsuki Fujisawa) took the bronze medal.
- November 19 – 26, 2016: 2016 European Curling Championships in Renfrewshire (Braehead)
  - Men: Sweden (Skip: Niklas Edin) defeated Norway (Skip: Thomas Ulsrud), 6–5, to win Sweden's third consecutive and tenth overall Men's European Curling Championships title.
    - Switzerland (Skip: Peter de Cruz) took the bronze medal.
  - Women: Russia (Skip: Victoria Moiseeva) defeated Sweden (Skip: Anna Hasselborg), 6–4, to win Russia's second consecutive and fourth overall Women's European Curling Championships title.
    - Scotland (Skip: Eve Muirhead) took the bronze medal.
- February 16 – 26: 2017 World Junior Curling Championships in Pyeongchang
  - Men: South Korea (Skip: Lee Ki-jeong) defeated United States (Skip: Andrew Stopera), 5–4, to win South Korea's first Men's World Junior Curling Championships title.
    - Norway (Skip: Magnus Ramsfjell) took the bronze medal.
  - Women: Sweden (Skip: Isabella Wranå) defeated Scotland (Skip: Sophie Jackson), 10–7, to win Sweden's fourth Women's World Junior Curling Championships title.
    - Canada (Skip: Kristen Streifel) took the bronze medal.
- March 4 – 11: 2017 World Wheelchair Curling Championship in (South Korea) Pyeongchang
  - Mixed: Norway (Skip: Rune Lorentsen) defeated Russia (Skip: Andrey Smirnov), 8–3, to win Norway's third World Wheelchair Curling Championship title.
    - Scotland (Skip: Aileen Neilson) took the bronze medal.
- March 18 – 26: 2017 World Women's Curling Championship in (China) Beijing
  - Canada (Skip: Rachel Homan) defeated Russia (Skip: Anna Sidorova), 8–3, to win Canada's 16th World Women's Curling Championship title.
  - Note: Canada became the first women's team to be undefeated throughout this tournament.
    - Scotland (Skip: Eve Muirhead) took the bronze medal.
- April 1 – 9: 2017 Ford World Men's Curling Championship in Edmonton
  - Canada (Skip: Brad Gushue) defeated Sweden (Skip: Niklas Edin), 4–2, to win Canada's 36th World Men's Curling Championship title.
    - Switzerland (Skip: Peter de Cruz) took the bronze medal.
- April 22 – 29: 2017 World Mixed Doubles and World Senior Curling Championships in Lethbridge
  - Mixed Doubles: Switzerland (Martin Rios & Jenny Perret) defeated Canada (Reid Carruthers & Joanne Courtney), 6–5, to win Switzerland's sixth World Mixed Doubles Curling Championship title.
    - China (Ba Dexin & Wang Rui) took the bronze medal.
  - Men's Seniors: Sweden (Skip: Mats Wrana) defeated Canada (Skip: Bryan Cochrane), 5–4, to win Sweden's second consecutive Men's World Senior Curling Championships title.
    - Ireland (Skip: Peter Wilson) took the bronze medal.
  - Women's Seniors: Canada (Skip: Colleen Jones) defeated Switzerland (Skip: Cristina Lestander), 10–5, to win Canada's 11th Women's World Senior Curling Championships title.
    - Scotland (Skip: Jackie Lockhart) took the bronze medal.
- December 5 – 10: 2018 Winter Olympics Qualification Curling Tournament in (Czech Republic) Plzeň
  - Men: Both Italy (Skip: Joël Retornaz) and Denmark (Skip: Rasmus Stjerne) qualified to compete at the 2018 Winter Olympics.
  - Women: Both China (Skip: Wang Bingyu) and Denmark (Skip: Madeleine Dupont) qualified to compete at the 2018 Winter Olympics.

=== 2016–17 Curling Canada season of champions ===
- November 30 – December 4, 2016: 2016 Canada Cup of Curling in (Manitoba) Brandon
  - Men: (Manitoba) Reid Carruthers (skip) defeated (Newfoundland and Labrador) Brad Gushue (skip), 8–6, to win his first Men's Canada Cup of Curling title.
  - Women: (Manitoba) Jennifer Jones (skip) defeated (Ontario) Rachel Homan (skip), 9–5, to win her third Women's Canada Cup of Curling title.
- January 12 – 15: 2017 Continental Cup of Curling in (United States) Las Vegas
  - (Canada) / (United States) Team North America defeated (United Nations) Team World, 37–23, in points.
- January 21 – 29: 2017 Canadian Junior Curling Championships in Victoria, British Columbia
  - Men: (British Columbia) Tyler Tardi (skip) defeated (Ontario) Matthew Hall (skip), 9–7, to win BC's fifth Canadian Junior Curling Championships title.
  - Women: Kristen Streifel (skip) defeated (Ontario) Hailey Armstrong (skip), 5–3, to win Alberta's ninth Women's Canadian Junior Curling Championships title.
- February 18 – 26: 2017 Scotties Tournament of Hearts in (Ontario) St. Catharines
  - (Ontario) Rachel Homan (skip) defeated (Manitoba) Michelle Englot (skip), 8–6, to win her third Scotties Tournament of Hearts title.
- March 4 – 12: 2017 Tim Hortons Brier in (Newfoundland and Labrador) St. John's
  - (Newfoundland and Labrador) Brad Gushue (skip) defeated (Canada) Kevin Koe (skip), 7–6, to win his first Tim Hortons Brier title.

=== 2016–17 World Curling Tour and Grand Slam of Curling ===
- October 25, 2016 – 2017: 2016–17 World Curling Tour and Grand Slam of Curling Schedules
  - October 25 – 30, 2016: 2016 The Masters Grand Slam of Curling in (Alberta) Okotoks
    - Men: (Sweden) Team Edin (Skip: Niklas Edin) defeated (Ontario) Team Jacobs (Skip: Brad Jacobs), 5–4, in the final.
    - Women: (Ontario) Team Flaxey (Skip: Allison Flaxey) defeated (Ontario) Team Homan (Skip: Rachel Homan), 6–3, in the final.
  - November 8 – 13, 2016: 2016 GSOC Tour Challenge in (British Columbia) Cranbrook
    - Men: (Sweden) Niklas Edin (skip) defeated (Scotland) Kyle Smith (skip), 7–3, to win his first Men's GSOC Tour Challenge title.
    - Women: (Alberta) Valerie Sweeting (skip) defeated (Manitoba) Michelle Englot (skip), 8–4, to win her first Women's GSOC Tour Challenge title.
  - December 6 – 11, 2016: 2016 Boost National in (Ontario) Sault Ste. Marie
    - Men: (Ontario) Brad Jacobs (skip) defeated (Manitoba) Reid Carruthers (skip), 4–2, to win his first Men's The National title.
    - Women: (Manitoba) Kerri Einarson (skip) defeated (Switzerland) Silvana Tirinzoni (skip), 5–3, to win her first Women's The National title.
  - January 3 – 8: 2017 Meridian Canadian Open in (Saskatchewan) North Battleford
    - Men: (Newfoundland and Labrador) Brad Gushue (skip) defeated (Sweden) Niklas Edin (skip), 8–3, to win his second Men's Meridian Canadian Open title.
    - Women: (Alberta) Casey Scheidegger (skip) defeated (Switzerland) Silvana Tirinzoni (skip), 5–4, to win her first Women's Meridian Canadian Open title.
  - March 16 – 19: 2017 Elite 10 in (Nova Scotia) Port Hawkesbury
    - (British Columbia) John Morris (skip) defeated (Ontario) Brad Jacobs (skip), 3–2, to win his first Elite 10 title.
  - April 11 – 16: 2017 Players' Championship in (Ontario) Toronto
    - Men: (Sweden) Niklas Edin (skip) defeated (Manitoba) Mike McEwen (skip), 5–3, to win his first Players' Championship title.
    - Note: Niklas' team was the first non-Canadian team to win this curling tournament.
    - Women: (Manitoba) Jennifer Jones (skip) defeated (Alberta) Valerie Sweeting (skip), 8–4, to win her sixth Players' Championship title.
  - April 25 – 30: 2017 Humpty's Champions Cup in (Alberta) Calgary
    - Men: (Ontario) Brad Jacobs (skip) defeated (Alberta) Kevin Koe (skip), 6–2, to win his first Humpty's Champions Cup title.
    - Women: (Ontario) Rachel Homan (skip) defeated (Sweden) Anna Hasselborg (skip), 5–4, to win her first Humpty's Champions Cup title.

== Figure skating ==
=== International figure skating events ===
- January 25 – 29: 2017 European Figure Skating Championships in (Czech Republic) Ostrava
  - Men's winner: (Spain) Javier Fernández
  - Ladies' winner: (Russia) Evgenia Medvedeva
  - Pairs winners: Russia (Evgenia Tarasova & Vladimir Morozov)
  - Ice dance winners: France (Gabriella Papadakis & Guillaume Cizeron)
- February 14 – 19: 2017 Four Continents Figure Skating Championships in (South Korea) Gangneung
  - Men's winner: (United States) Nathan Chen
  - Ladies' winner: (Japan) Mai Mihara
  - Pairs winners: China (Sui Wenjing & Han Cong)
  - Ice dance winners: Canada (Tessa Virtue & Scott Moir)
- March 15 – 19: 2017 World Junior Figure Skating Championships in (Chinese Taipei) Taipei
  - Junior Men's winner: (United States) Vincent Zhou
  - Junior Ladies' winner: (Russia) Alina Zagitova
  - Junior Pairs winners: Australia (Ekaterina Alexandrovskaya & Harley Windsor)
  - Junior Ice dance winners: The United States (Rachel Parsons & Michael Parsons)
- March 29 – April 2: 2017 World Figure Skating Championships in (Finland) Helsinki
  - Men's winner: (Japan) Yuzuru Hanyu
  - Ladies' winner: (Russia) Evgenia Medvedeva
  - Pairs winners: China (Sui Wenjing & Han Cong)
  - Ice dance winners: Canada (Tessa Virtue & Scott Moir)
- April 20 – 23: 2017 ISU World Team Trophy in Figure Skating in Tokyo
  - Champions: Japan; Second: Russia; Third: The United States

=== 2016–17 ISU Grand Prix of Figure Skating ===
- October 21 – 23: 2016 Skate America in Chicago
  - Men's winner: (Japan) Shoma Uno
  - Ladies' winner: (United States) Ashley Wagner
  - Pairs winners: Canada (Julianne Séguin & Charlie Bilodeau)
  - Ice dance winners: United States (Maia Shibutani & Alex Shibutani)
- October 28 – 30: 2016 Skate Canada International in Mississauga
  - Men's winner: (Canada) Patrick Chan
  - Ladies' winner: (Russia) Evgenia Medvedeva
  - Pairs winners: Canada (Meagan Duhamel & Eric Radford)
  - Ice dance winners: Canada (Tessa Virtue & Scott Moir)
- November 4 – 6: 2016 Rostelecom Cup in Moscow
  - Men's winner: (Spain) Javier Fernández
  - Ladies' winner: (Russia) Anna Pogorilaya
  - Pairs winners: Germany (Aliona Savchenko & Bruno Massot)
  - Ice dance winners: Russia (Ekaterina Bobrova & Dmitri Soloviev)
- November 11 – 13: 2016 Trophée de France in Paris
  - Men's winner: (Spain) Javier Fernández
  - Ladies' winner: (Russia) Evgenia Medvedeva
  - Pairs winners: Germany (Aliona Savchenko & Bruno Massot)
  - Ice dance winners: France (Gabriella Papadakis & Guillaume Cizeron)
- November 18 – 20: 2016 Cup of China in Beijing
  - Men's winner: (Canada) Patrick Chan
  - Ladies' winner: (Russia) Elena Radionova
  - Pairs winners: China (Yu Xiaoyu & Zhang Hao)
  - Ice dance winners: United States (Maia Shibutani & Alex Shibutani)
- November 25 – 27: 2016 NHK Trophy in (Japan) Sapporo
  - Men's winner: (Japan) Yuzuru Hanyu
  - Ladies' winner: (Russia) Anna Pogorilaya
  - Pairs winners: Canada (Meagan Duhamel & Eric Radford)
  - Ice dance winners: Canada (Tessa Virtue & Scott Moir)
- December 8 – 11: 2016–17 Grand Prix of Figure Skating Final in (France) Marseille
  - Men's winner: (Japan) Yuzuru Hanyu
  - Ladies' winner: (Russia) Evgenia Medvedeva
  - Pairs winners: Russia (Evgenia Tarasova & Vladimir Morozov)
  - Ice dance winners: Canada (Tessa Virtue & Scott Moir)

=== 2016–17 ISU Junior Grand Prix ===
- August 24 – 28: 2016 ISU Junior Grand Prix in France in Saint-Gervais-les-Bains
  - Junior Men winner: (Russia) Roman Savosin
  - Junior Ladies winner: (Russia) Alina Zagitova
  - Junior Ice Dance winners: France (Angélique Abachkina & Louis Thauron)
- August 31 – September 4: 2016 ISU Junior Grand Prix in the Czech Republic in Ostrava
  - Junior Men winner: (Russia) Dmitri Aliev
  - Junior Ladies winner: (Russia) Anastasiia Gubanova
  - Junior Pairs winners: Czech Republic (Anna Dušková & Martin Bidař)
  - Junior Ice Dance winners: United States (Lorraine McNamara & Quinn Carpenter)
- September 7 – 11: 2016 ISU Junior Grand Prix in Japan in Yokohama
  - Junior Men winner: (South Korea) Cha Jun-hwan
  - Junior Ladies winner: (Japan) Kaori Sakamoto
  - Junior Ice Dance winners: United States (Rachel Parsons & Michael Parsons)
- September 14 – 18: 2016 ISU Junior Grand Prix in Russia in Saransk
  - Junior Men winner: (Russia) Alexander Samarin
  - Junior Ladies winner: (Russia) Elizaveta Nugumanova
  - Junior Pairs winners: Russia (Anastasia Mishina & Vladislav Mirzoev)
  - Junior Ice Dance winners: Russia (Alla Loboda & Pavel Drozd)
- September 21 – 25: 2016 ISU Junior Grand Prix in Slovenia in Ljubljana
  - Junior Men winner: (United States) Alexei Krasnozhon
  - Junior Ladies winner: (Japan) Rika Kihira
  - Junior Ice Dance winners: United States (Lorraine McNamara & Quinn Carpenter)
- September 28 – October 2: 2016 ISU Junior Grand Prix in Estonia in Tallinn
  - Junior Men winner: (Russia) Alexander Samarin
  - Junior Ladies winner: (Russia) Polina Tsurskaya
  - Junior Pairs winners: Australia (Ekaterina Alexandrovskaya & Harley Windsor)
  - Junior Ice Dance winners: Russia (Alla Loboda & Pavel Drozd)
- October 5 – 9: 2016 ISU Junior Grand Prix in Germany in Dresden
  - Junior Men winner: (South Korea) Cha Jun-hwan
  - Junior Ladies winner: (Russia) Anastasiia Gubanova
  - Junior Pairs winners: Russia (Anastasia Mishina & Vladislav Mirzoev)
  - Junior Ice Dance winners: United States (Rachel Parsons & Michael Parsons)
- December 8 – 11: 2016–17 Grand Prix of Figure Skating Final in (France) Marseille
  - Junior Men winner: (Russia) Dmitri Aliev
  - Junior Ladies winner: (Russia) Alina Zagitova
  - Junior Pairs winners: Russia (Anastasia Mishina & Vladislav Mirzoev)
  - Junior Ice Dance winners: United States (Rachel Parsons & Michael Parsons)

== Ice hockey ==
=== World ice hockey championships ===
- December 26, 2016 – January 5, 2017: 2017 World Junior Ice Hockey Championships in Toronto and Montreal
  - The United States defeated Canada, 5–4 in a shootout, to win their fourth World Junior Ice Hockey Championships title.
  - Russia took the bronze medal.
- January 7 – 14: 2017 IIHF World Women's U18 Championship in (Czech Republic) Přerov and Zlín
  - The United States defeated Canada, 3–1, to win their third consecutive and sixth overall IIHF World Women's U18 Championship title.
  - Russia took the bronze medal.
- March 31 – April 7: 2017 IIHF Women's World Championship in Plymouth Township, Michigan
  - The United States defeated Canada, 3–2 in overtime, to win their fourth consecutive and eighth overall IIHF Women's World Championship title.
  - Finland took the bronze medal.
- April 13 – 23: 2017 IIHF World U18 Championships in (Slovakia) Poprad and Spišská Nová Ves
  - The United States defeated Finland, 4–2, to win their tenth IIHF World U18 Championships title.
  - Russia took the bronze medal.
- May 5 – 21: 2017 IIHF World Championship co-hosted in both (France) Paris and (Germany) Cologne
  - Sweden defeated Canada, 2–1 in a shootout and after a 1–1 score in regular play, to win their tenth IIHF World Championship title.
  - Russia took the bronze medal.

=== National Hockey League ===
- October 12, 2016 – April 9, 2017: 2016–17 NHL season
  - Presidents' Trophy winner: (Washington, D.C.) Washington Capitals
  - Regular season scoring winner: (Ontario) Connor McDavid ( (Alberta) Edmonton Oilers)
  - Regular season leading goaltenders winner: (Russia) Sergei Bobrovsky ( (Ohio) Columbus Blue Jackets)
- January 1: NHL Centennial Classic at BMO Field in (Canada) Toronto
  - The (Ontario) Toronto Maple Leafs defeated the (Michigan) Detroit Red Wings, 5–4, in overtime.
- January 2: 2017 NHL Winter Classic at Busch Stadium in (United States) St. Louis
  - The (Missouri) St. Louis Blues defeated the (Illinois) Chicago Blackhawks, 4–1.
- January 28 & 29: 62nd National Hockey League All-Star Game at Staples Center in (United States) Los Angeles
  - Gatorade NHL Skills Challenge Relay winners: Metropolitan Division
  - Honda NHL Four Line Challenge winners: Pacific Division
  - DraftKings NHL Accuracy Shooting winners: Metropolitan & Pacific Divisions
    - Individual AS winner: (Nova Scotia) Sidney Crosby ( (Pennsylvania) Pittsburgh Penguins)
  - Bridgestone NHL Fastest Skater winners: Pacific & Atlantic Divisions
    - Individual FS winner: (Ontario) Connor McDavid ( (Alberta) Edmonton Oilers)
  - Oscar Mayer NHL Hardest Shot winners: Atlantic Division
    - Individual HS winner: (British Columbia) Shea Weber ( (Quebec) Montreal Canadiens)
  - Discover NHL Shootout winners: Atlantic Division
  - All-Star Game: The Metropolitan Division defeated the Pacific Division, 4–3.
    - MVP: (Ontario) Wayne Simmonds ( (Pennsylvania) Philadelphia Flyers)
- February 25: 2017 NHL Stadium Series at Heinz Field in (United States) Pittsburgh
  - The (Pennsylvania) Pittsburgh Penguins defeated the (Pennsylvania) Philadelphia Flyers, 4–2.
- April 12 – June 11: 2017 Stanley Cup playoffs
  - The (Pennsylvania) Pittsburgh Penguins defeated the (Tennessee) Nashville Predators, 4–2 in games won, to win their second consecutive and fifth overall Stanley Cup title.
  - Conn Smythe Trophy winner: (Nova Scotia) Sidney Crosby (Pittsburgh Penguins)
- June 23 & 24: 2017 NHL entry draft at the United Center in (United States) Chicago
  - #1 pick: (Switzerland) Nico Hischier (to the New Jersey Devils from the (Nova Scotia) Halifax Mooseheads)
- October 4, 2017 – April 7, 2018: 2017–18 NHL season
- December 16: NHL 100 Classic at TD Place Stadium in (Canada) Ottawa
  - The (Ontario) Ottawa Senators defeated the (Quebec) Montreal Canadiens, 3–0.

=== Kontinental Hockey League ===
- August 22, 2016 – April 16, 2017: 2016–17 KHL season
  - (Russia) SKA defeated fellow Russian team, Metallurg Magnitogorsk, 4–1 in games played, to win their second Gagarin Cup title.

=== Champions Hockey League ===
- August 16, 2016 – February 7, 2017: 2016–17 Champions Hockey League
  - (Sweden) Frölunda HC defeated (Czech Republic) HC Sparta Praha, 4–3, to win their second consecutive Champions Hockey League title.

=== Asia League Ice Hockey ===
- August 27, 2016 – April 11, 2017: 2016–17 Asia League Ice Hockey
  - (South Korea) Anyang Halla defeated (Russia) PSK Sakhalin, 3–0 in games played, to win their third consecutive and fifth overall Asia League Ice Hockey title.

=== IIHF Continental Cup ===
- September 30, 2016 – January 15, 2017: 2016–17 IIHF Continental Cup
  - Winner: (United Kingdom) Nottingham Panthers (promoted to the 2017–18 Champions Hockey League)

=== Clarkson Cup ===
- March 5, 2017: 2017 Clarkson Cup in Ottawa, Ontario
  - The (Quebec) Les Canadiennes de Montreal defeated the (Alberta) Calgary Inferno 3–1 to win their first Clarkson Cup title.

=== NWHL ===
- March 19, 2016: 2017 Isobel Cup in Lowell, Massachusetts, at the Tsongas Center.
  - The (New York (state)) Buffalo Beauts defeated the (Massachusetts) Boston Pride 3–2 to win the second Isobel Cup.

=== Memorial Cup ===
- May 19 – 28, 2017: 2017 Memorial Cup in Windsor, Ontario
  - The (Ontario) Windsor Spitfires defeated the (Pennsylvania) Erie Otters, 4–3, to win their third Memorial Cup title.

=== Allan Cup ===
- April 10 – 15: 2017 Allan Cup in (New Brunswick) Bouctouche
  - (Newfoundland and Labrador) Grand Falls-Windsor Cataracts defeated (Alberta) Lacombe Generals, 7–4, to win their first Allan Cup title.

== Luge ==
=== International luge events ===
- December 4, 2016: 2016 Junior America-Pacific Luge Championships in (Canada) Calgary
  - Junior Women's Singles: (United States) Brittney Arndt
- December 16 & 17, 2016: 2016 America-Pacific Luge Championships in Park City, Utah
  - Singles: (United States) Tucker West (m) / (United States) Erin Hamlin (f)
  - Men's Doubles: United States (Matthew Mortensen & Jayson Terdiman)
- December 22 & 23, 2016: 2016 Asian Luge Championships in (Japan) Nagano
  - Men's Singles: (India) Shiva Keshavan
- January 5 & 6: FIL European Luge Championships 2017 in Schönau am Königsee
  - Singles: (Russia) Semen Pavlichenko (m) / (Germany) Natalie Geisenberger (f)
  - Men's Doubles: Germany (Tobias Wendl & Tobias Arlt)
  - Mixed Team Relay: Germany (Natalie Geisenberger, Ralf Palik, Tobias Wendl & Tobias Arlt)
- January 21 & 22: 2017 FIL Junior European Luge Championships in Oberhof
  - Junior Singles: (Germany) Max Langenhan (m) / (Germany) Jessica Tiebel (f)
  - Junior Men's Doubles: Germany (Hannes Orlamünder & Paul Gubitz)
- January 27 – 29: FIL World Luge Championships 2017 in Innsbruck
  - Singles: (Austria) Wolfgang Kindl (m) / (Germany) Tatjana Hüfner (f)
  - Men's Doubles: Germany (Toni Eggert & Sascha Benecken)
  - Sprint: (Austria) Wolfgang Kindl (m) / (United States) Erin Hamlin (f)
  - Men's Sprint Doubles: Germany (Tobias Wendl & Tobias Arlt)
  - U23: (Russia) Roman Repilov (m) / (United States) Summer Britcher (f)
  - Men's U23 Doubles: Austria (Thomas Steu & Lorenz Koller)
- February 2 – 5: 2017 FIL World Luge Natural Track Championships in (Romania) Vatra Dornei
  - Singles: (Italy) Alex Gruber (m) / (Italy) Greta Pinggera (f)
  - Men's Doubles: Austria (Rupert Brueggler & Tobias Angerer)
- February 4 & 5: 2017 FIL Junior World Luge Championships in (Latvia) Sigulda
  - Junior Singles: (Latvia) Kristers Aparjods (m) / (Germany) Jessica Tiebel (f)
  - Junior Men's Doubles: Germany (Hannes Orlamunder & Paul Gubitz)
- February 11 & 12: 2017 FIL Junior European Luge Natural Track Championships in (Austria) Umhausen
  - Junior Singles: (Austria) Fabian Achenrainer (m) / (Italy) Alexandra Pfattner (f)
  - Junior Men's Doubles: Italy (Manuel Gaio & Nicolo Debertolis)

=== 2016–17 Luge World Cup ===
- November 26 & 27, 2016: #1 in Winterberg
  - Singles: (Germany) Johannes Ludwig (m) / (Germany) Natalie Geisenberger (f)
  - Men's Doubles: Germany (Toni Eggert & Sascha Benecken)
- December 2 & 3, 2016: #2 in (United States) Lake Placid, New York
  - Singles: (United States) Tucker West (m) / (Germany) Tatjana Hüfner (f)
  - Men's Doubles: Germany (Toni Eggert & Sascha Benecken)
- December 9 & 10, 2016: #3 in (Canada) Whistler, British Columbia
  - Singles: (United States) Tucker West (m) / (Canada) Alex Gough (f)
  - Men's Doubles: Germany (Toni Eggert & Sascha Benecken)
- December 16 & 17, 2016: #4 in (United States) Park City, Utah
  - Singles: (Russia) Roman Repilov (m) / (United States) Erin Hamlin (f)
  - Men's Doubles: Germany (Tobias Wendl & Tobias Arlt)
- January 5 & 6: #5 in Schönau am Königsee
  - Singles: (Russia) Semen Pavlichenko (m) / (Germany) Natalie Geisenberger (f)
  - Men's Doubles: Germany (Tobias Wendl & Tobias Arlt)
- January 14 & 15: #6 in (Latvia) Sigulda
  - Singles: (Russia) Semen Pavlichenko (m) / (Germany) Natalie Geisenberger (f)
  - Men's Doubles: Germany (Toni Eggert & Sascha Benecken)
- February 4 & 5: #7 in Oberhof
  - Singles: (Germany) Felix Loch (m) / (Germany) Natalie Geisenberger (f)
  - Men's Doubles: Germany (Tobias Wendl & Tobias Arlt)
- February 18 & 19: #8 in (South Korea) Pyeongchang
  - Singles: (Italy) Dominik Fischnaller (m) / (Russia) Tatiana Ivanova (f)
  - Men's Doubles: Germany (Toni Eggert & Sascha Benecken)
- February 25 & 26: #9 (final) in Altenberg, Saxony
  - Singles: (Russia) Roman Repilov (m) / (Germany) Natalie Geisenberger (f)
  - Men's Doubles: Germany (Toni Eggert & Sascha Benecken)

=== 2016–17 Team Relay Luge World Cup ===
- December 2 & 3, 2016: #1 in (United States) Lake Placid, New York
  - Winners: Canada (Kimberley McRae, Samuel Edney, Tristan Walker & Justin Snith)
- December 10, 2016: #2 in (Canada) Whistler, British Columbia
  - Event cancelled, due to unfavorable weather delays.
- January 5 & 6: #3 in Schönau am Königsee
  - Winners: Germany (Natalie Geisenberger, Ralf Palik, Tobias Wendl & Tobias Arlt)
- January 14 & 15: #4 in (Latvia) Sigulda
  - Winners: Russia (Tatiana Ivanova, Semen Pavlichenko, Vladislav Yuzhakov & Iurii Prokhorov)
- February 4 & 5: #5 in Oberhof
  - Winners: Germany (Natalie Geisenberger, Felix Loch, Tobias Wendl & Tobias Arlt)
- February 18 & 19: #6 in (South Korea) Pyeongchang
  - Winners: Germany (Natalie Geisenberger, Andi Langenhan, Toni Eggert & Sascha Benecken)
- February 26: #7 (final) in Altenberg
  - Winners: Germany (Natalie Geisenberger, Felix Loch, Toni Eggert & Sascha Benecken)

=== 2016–17 Sprint Luge World Cup ===
- November 26 & 27, 2016: #1 in Winterberg
  - Singles: (Germany) Felix Loch (m) / (Germany) Dajana Eitberger (f)
  - Men's Doubles: Germany (Toni Eggert & Sascha Benecken)
- December 16 & 17, 2016: #2 in (United States) Park City, Utah
  - Singles: (Italy) Dominik Fischnaller (m) / (United States) Erin Hamlin (f)
  - Men's Doubles: Germany (Toni Eggert & Sascha Benecken)
- January 14 & 15: #3 (final) in (Latvia) Sigulda
  - Singles: (Russia) Roman Repilov (m) / (Russia) Tatiana Ivanova (f)
  - Men's Doubles: Germany (Toni Eggert & Sascha Benecken)

=== 2016–17 FIL World Cup – Natural Track ===
- December 9 – 11, 2016: WCNT #1 in (Austria) Kühtai
  - Singles: (Italy) Patrick Pigneter (m) / (Austria) Tina Unterberger (f)
  - Men's Doubles: Italy (Patrick Pigneter & Florian Clara)
- January 6 – 8, 2017: WCNT #2 in (Italy) Latsch
  - Singles: (Italy) Patrick Pigneter (m) / (Italy) Evelin Lanthaler (f)
  - Men's Doubles: Austria (Rupert Brueggler & Tobias Angerer)
- January 12 – 15: WCNT #3 in Moscow
  - Singles: (Austria) Thomas Kammerlander (m) / (Italy) Evelin Lanthaler (f)
  - Men's Doubles: Russia (Pavel Porshnev & Ivan Lazarev)
- January 20 – 22: WCNT #4 in (Slovenia) Železniki
  - Singles: (Italy) Patrick Pigneter (m) / (Italy) Greta Pinggera (f)
  - Men's Doubles: Italy (Patrick Pigneter & Florian Clara)
- January 27 – 29: WCNT #5 in (Italy) Deutschnofen
  - Singles: (Italy) Alex Gruber (m) / (Italy) Greta Pinggera (f)
  - Men's Doubles: Russia (Pavel Porshnev & Ivan Lazarev)
- February 16 – 18: WCNT #6 (final) in (Austria) Umhausen
  - Singles: (Austria) Thomas Kammerlander (m) / (Italy) Greta Pinggera (f)
  - Men's Doubles: Russia (Pavel Porshnev & Ivan Lazarev)

== Speed skating ==
=== 2016–17 ISU Speed Skating World Cup ===
- November 11–13, 2016: ISU LTSS World Cup #1 in (China) Harbin
  - 500 m #1 winners: (Kazakhstan) Roman Krech (m) / (Japan) Nao Kodaira (f)
  - 500 m #2 winners: (Russia) Pavel Kulizhnikov (m) / (Japan) Nao Kodaira (f)
  - 1000 m winners: (Netherlands) Kjeld Nuis (m) / (United States) Heather Richardson-Bergsma (f)
  - 1500 m winners: (Netherlands) Sven Kramer (m) / (United States) Heather Richardson-Bergsma (f)
  - Women's 3000 m winner: (Czech Republic) Martina Sáblíková
  - Men's 5000 m winner: (Netherlands) Sven Kramer
  - Men's Team Pursuit winners: The Netherlands (Sven Kramer, Douwe de Vries, Patrick Roest, & Jorrit Bergsma)
  - Women's Team Pursuit winners: The Netherlands (Ireen Wüst, Marrit Leenstra, Antoinette de Jong, & Marije Joling)
  - Mass start winners: (South Korea) Lee Seung-hoon (m) / (Canada) Ivanie Blondin (f)
- November 18–20, 2016: ISU LTSS World Cup #2 in Nagano
  - 500 m winners: (Germany) Nico Ihle (m) / (Japan) Nao Kodaira (f)
  - 1000 m winners: (Netherlands) Kjeld Nuis (m) / (United States) Heather Richardson-Bergsma (f)
  - 1500 m winners: (United States) Joey Mantia (m) / (United States) Heather Richardson-Bergsma (f)
  - Men's 5000 m winner: (Netherlands) Sven Kramer
  - Women's 3000 m winner: (Czech Republic) Martina Sáblíková
  - Men's Team Pursuit winners: The Netherlands (Sven Kramer, Jorrit Bergsma, Douwe de Vries, & Patrick Roest)
  - Women's Team Pursuit winners: The Netherlands (Marrit Leenstra, Antoinette de Jong, Marije Joling, & Ireen Wüst)
  - Men's Team Sprint winners: Canada (Laurent Dubreuil, Christopher Fiola, Vincent De Haître, & Alexandre St-Jean)
  - Women's Team Sprint winners: Japan (Erina Kamiya, Arisa Go, Maki Tsuji, & Saori Toi)
  - Mass start winners: (Netherlands) Jorrit Bergsma (m) / (South Korea) Kim Bo-reum (f)
- December 2–4, 2016: ISU LTSS World Cup #3 in (Kazakhstan) Astana
  - 500 m #1 winners: (Netherlands) Dai Dai Ntab (m) / (China) Yu Jing (f)
  - 500 m #2 winners: (Russia) Ruslan Murashov (m) / (China) Yu Jing (f)
  - 1000 m winners: (Canada) Vincent De Haître (m) / (Japan) Miho Takagi (f)
  - 1500 m winners: (Russia) Denis Yuskov (m) / (Japan) Miho Takagi (f)
  - Men's 5000 m winner: (New Zealand) Peter Michael
  - Women's 3000 m winner: (Czech Republic) Martina Sáblíková
  - Men's Team Pursuit winners: Japan (Shota Nakamura, Ryosuke Tsuchiya, & Shane Williamson)
  - Women's Team Pursuit winners: Japan (Miho Takagi, Misaki Oshigiri, Nana Takagi, & Ayano Sato)
  - Mass start winners: (Italy) Andrea Giovannini (m) / (Canada) Ivanie Blondin (f)
- December 9–11, 2016: ISU LTSS World Cup #4 in (Netherlands) Heerenveen
  - 500 m winners: (Russia) Ruslan Murashov (m) / (Japan) Nao Kodaira (f)
  - 1000 m winners: (Netherlands) Kjeld Nuis (m) / (United States) Heather Richardson-Bergsma (f)
  - 1500 m winners: (Netherlands) Kjeld Nuis (m) / (Netherlands) Ireen Wüst (f)
  - Men's 10,000 m winner: (Netherlands) Jorrit Bergsma
  - Women's 5000 m winner: (Czech Republic) Martina Sáblíková
  - Men's Team Pursuit winners: Norway (Sverre Lunde Pedersen, Simen Spieler Nilsen, Sindre Henriksen, & Håvard Holmefjord Lorentzen)
  - Women's Team Pursuit winners: Japan (Miho Takagi, Ayano Sato, & Nana Takagi)
  - Men's Team Sprint winners: The United States (Kimani Griffin, Jonathan Garcia, Mitchell Whitmore, & Brian Hansen)
  - Women's Team Sprint winners: Japan (Arisa Go, Maki Tsuji, & Nao Kodaira)
  - Mass start winners: (United States) Joey Mantia (m) / (South Korea) Kim Bo-reum (f)
- January 27–29, 2017: ISU LTSS World Cup #5 in (Germany) Berlin
  - 500 m #1 winners: (Germany) Nico Ihle (m) / (Japan) Nao Kodaira (f)
  - 500 m #2 winners: (Russia) Ruslan Murashov (m) / (Japan) Nao Kodaira (f)
  - Men's 1000 m winners: (Netherlands) Kjeld Nuis (#1) / (Netherlands) Kai Verbij (#2)
  - Women's 1000 m winner: (United States) Heather Richardson-Bergsma (2 times)
  - 1500 m winners: (Netherlands) Kjeld Nuis (m) / (Netherlands) Ireen Wüst (f)
  - Men's 5000 m winner: (Canada) Ted-Jan Bloemen
  - Women's 3000 m winner: (Netherlands) Ireen Wüst
- March 10–12, 2017: ISU LTSS World Cup #6 (final) in (Norway) Stavanger
  - Note: The ISU removed Chelyabinsk from hosting it, due to the McLaren Report.
  - 500 m winners: (Netherlands) Dai Dai Ntab (m; 2 times) / (Japan) Nao Kodaira (f; 2 times)
  - 1000 m winners: (Netherlands) Kjeld Nuis (m) / (United States) Heather Richardson-Bergsma (f)
  - 1500 m winners: (Netherlands) Kjeld Nuis (m) / (United States) Heather Richardson-Bergsma (f)
  - Men's 5000 m winner: (Netherlands) Jorrit Bergsma
  - Women's 3000 m winner: (Czech Republic) Martina Sáblíková
  - Men's Team Pursuit winners: The Netherlands (Jorrit Bergsma, Douwe de Vries, Evert Hoolwerf, & Arjan Stroetinga)
  - Women's Team Pursuit winners: Japan (Misaki Oshigiri, Miho Takagi, Nana Takagi, & Ayano Sato)
  - Men's Team Sprint winners: The Netherlands (Jan Smeekens, Ronald Mulder, Kai Verbij, & Pim Schipper)
  - Women's Team Sprint winners: The Netherlands (Floor van den Brandt, Anice Das, Marrit Leenstra, & Sanneke de Neeling)
  - Mass Start winners: (South Korea) Lee Seung-hoon (m) / (Netherlands) Irene Schouten (f)

=== Other long track speed skating events ===
- January 6–8, 2017: 2017 European Speed Skating Championships in (Netherlands) Heerenveen
  - Note: This event was scheduled for Warsaw, but cancelled, due to major problems at that city's venue.
  - Allround winners: (Netherlands) Sven Kramer (m) / (Netherlands) Ireen Wüst (f)
  - Sprint winners: (Netherlands) Kai Verbij (m) / (Czech Republic) Karolína Erbanová (f)
- February 9–12, 2017: 2017 World Single Distance Speed Skating Championships in (South Korea) Gangneung
  - 500 m winners: (Netherlands) Jan Smeekens (m) / (Japan) Nao Kodaira (f)
  - 1000 m winners: (Netherlands) Kjeld Nuis (m) / (United States) Heather Richardson-Bergsma (f)
  - 1500 m winners: (Netherlands) Kjeld Nuis (m) / (United States) Heather Richardson-Bergsma (f)
  - 5000 m winners: (Netherlands) Sven Kramer (m) / (Czech Republic) Martina Sáblíková (f)
  - Men's 10000 m winner: (Netherlands) Sven Kramer
  - Women's 3000 m winner: (Netherlands) Ireen Wüst
  - Men's Team Pursuit winners: The Netherlands (Jorrit Bergsma, Jan Blokhuijsen, Douwe de Vries, & Patrick Roest)
  - Women's Team Pursuit winners: The Netherlands (Ireen Wüst, Marrit Leenstra, Antoinette de Jong, & Annouk van der Weijden)
  - Mass Start winners: (United States) Joey Mantia (m) / (South Korea) Kim Bo-reum (f)
- February 17–19, 2017: 2017 World Junior Speed Skating Championships in (Finland) Helsinki
  - 500 m winners: (Japan) Koki Kubo (m) / (Russia) Daria Kachanova (f)
  - 1000 m winners: (Norway) Allan Dahl Johansson (m) / (Russia) Daria Kachanova (f)
  - 1500 m winners: (Norway) Allan Dahl Johansson (m) / (Netherlands) Jutta Leerdam (f)
  - Men's 5000 m winner: (Netherlands) Chris Huizinga
  - Women's 3000 m winner: (Netherlands) Joy Beune
  - Men's Team Pursuit winners: Japan (Riki Hayashi, Riku Tsuchiya, & Aoi Yokoyama)
  - Women's Team Pursuit winners: The Netherlands (Joy Beune, Elisa Dul, Sanne In't Hof, & Jutta Leerdam)
  - Men's Team Sprint winners: The Netherlands (Niek Deelstra, Thijs Govers, & Tijmen Snel)
  - Women's Team Sprint winners: China (LI Huawei, YANG Sining, SUN Nan, & XI Dongxue)
  - Mass Start winners: (Netherlands) Chris Huizinga (m) / (Netherlands) Elisa Dul (f)
- February 25 & 26, 2017: 2017 World Sprint Speed Skating Championships in (Canada) Calgary
  - Men's 500 m winner: (Netherlands) Ronald Mulder (2 times)
  - Men's 1000 m winner: (Netherlands) Kjeld Nuis (2 times)
  - Women's 500 m winner: (Japan) Nao Kodaira (2 times)
  - Women's 1000 m winners: (Japan) Nao Kodaira (#1) / (United States) Heather Richardson-Bergsma (#2)
- March 4 & 5, 2017: 2017 World Allround Speed Skating Championships in (Norway) Hamar
  - 500 m winners: (Japan) Shota Nakamura (m) / (Japan) Miho Takagi (f)
  - 1500 m winners: (Russia) Denis Yuskov (m) / (Netherlands) Ireen Wüst (f)
  - 5000 m winners: (Netherlands) Sven Kramer (m) / (Czech Republic) Martina Sáblíková (f)
  - Men's 10,000 m winner: (Netherlands) Sven Kramer
  - Women's 3000 m winner: (Czech Republic) Martina Sáblíková

=== 2016–17 ISU Short Track Speed Skating World Cup ===
- November 4–6, 2016: ISU STSS World Cup #1 in (Canada) Calgary
  - 500 m #1 winners: (Canada) Samuel Girard (m) / (China) Fan Kexin (f)
  - 500 m #2 winners: (Hungary) Sándor Liu Shaolin (m) / (United Kingdom) Elise Christie (f)
  - 1000 m winners: (Canada) Charle Cournoyer (m) / (South Korea) Choi Min-jeong (f)
  - 1500 m winners: (Netherlands) Sjinkie Knegt (m) / (South Korea) Shim Suk-hee (f)
  - Men's 5000 m Relay winners: Hungary (Liu Shaoang, Sándor Liu Shaolin, Csaba Burján, Viktor Knoch)
  - Women's 3000 m Relay winners: South Korea (Shim Suk-hee, Noh Do-hee, KIM Geon-hee, Choi Min-jeong)
- November 11–13, 2016: ISU STSS World Cup #2 in (United States) Salt Lake City
  - 500 m winners: (Kazakhstan) Abzal Azhgaliyev (m) / (Canada) Marianne St-Gelais (f)
  - 1000 m winners: (South Korea) LIM Kyoung-won (m) / (South Korea) KIM Ji-yoo (f)
  - 1500 m #1 winners: (Canada) Samuel Girard (m) / (South Korea) Choi Min-jeong (f)
  - 1500 m #2 winners: (Netherlands) Sjinkie Knegt (m) / (South Korea) Shim Suk-hee (f)
  - Men's 5000 m Relay winners: China (Wu Dajing, XU Hongzhi, Han Tianyu, & Ren Ziwei)
  - Women's 3000 m Relay winners: South Korea (Noh Do-hee, Shim Suk-hee, Choi Min-jeong, & KIM Ji-yoo)
- December 9–11, 2016: ISU STSS World Cup #3 in Shanghai
  - 500 m #1 winners: (China) Wu Dajing (m) / (United Kingdom) Elise Christie (f)
  - 500 m #2 winners: (China) Wu Dajing (m) / (United Kingdom) Elise Christie (f)
  - 1000 m winners: (Hungary) Liu Shaoang (m) / (South Korea) Choi Min-jeong (f)
  - 1500 m winners: (South Korea) Lee Jung-su (m) / (South Korea) Shim Suk-hee (f)
  - Men's 5000 m Relay winners: China (Wu Dajing, XU Hongzhi, Han Tianyu, & Ren Ziwei)
  - Women's 3000 m Relay winners: South Korea (Noh Do-hee, Shim Suk-hee, Choi Min-jeong, & KIM Ji-yoo)
- December 16–18, 2016: ISU STSS World Cup #4 in Gangneung
  - 500 m winners: (China) Wu Dajing (m) / (South Korea) Choi Min-jeong (f)
  - 1000 m #1 winners: (Kazakhstan) Nurbergen Zhumagaziyev (m) / (United Kingdom) Elise Christie (f)
  - 1000 m #2 winners: (Canada) Charles Hamelin (m) / (United Kingdom) Elise Christie (f)
  - 1500 m winners: (South Korea) Lee Jung-su (m) / (South Korea) Shim Suk-hee (f)
  - Men's 5000 m Relay winners: Hungary (Viktor Knoch, Csaba Burján, Sándor Liu Shaolin, & Liu Shaoang)
  - Women's 3000 m Relay winners: South Korea (Noh Do-hee, Shim Suk-hee, Choi Min-jeong, & KIM Ji-yoo)
- February 3–5, 2017: ISU STSS World Cup #5 in (Germany) Dresden
  - 500 m winners: (Hungary) Sándor Liu Shaolin (m) / (Canada) Marianne St-Gelais (f)
  - 1000 m winners: (France) Thibaut Fauconnet (m) / (Canada) Marianne St-Gelais (f)
  - 1500 m #1 winners: (Canada) Charles Hamelin (m) / (Canada) Kim Boutin (f)
  - 1500 m #2 winners: (Netherlands) Sjinkie Knegt (m) / (Netherlands) Suzanne Schulting (f)
  - Men's 5000 m Relay winners: Russia (Semion Elistratov, Vladimir Grigorev, Viktor Ahn, & Alexander Shulginov)
  - Women's 3000 m Relay winners: The Netherlands (Yara van Kerkhof, Lara van Ruijven, Rianne de Vries, & Suzanne Schulting)
- February 10–12, 2017: ISU STSS World Cup #6 (final) in (Belarus) Minsk
  - 500 m winners: (Kazakhstan) Denis Nikisha (m) / (South Korea) KIM Ye-jin (f)
  - 1000 m #1 winners: (South Korea) HWANG Dae-heon (m) / (China) LIU Yang (f)
  - 1000 m #2 winners: (South Korea) LIM Yong-jin (m) / (China) Han Yutong (f)
  - 1500 m winners: (South Korea) LEE Hyo-been (m) / (South Korea) Noh Ah-reum (f)
  - Men's 5000 m Relay winners: The Netherlands (Daan Breeuwsma, Sjinkie Knegt, Itzhak de Laat, & Dennis Visser)
  - Women's 3000 m Relay winners: Russia (Tatiana Borodulina, Evgeniya Zakharova, Sofia Prosvirnova, & Ekaterina Konstantinova)

=== Other short track speed skating events ===
- January 13 – 15: 2017 European Short Track Speed Skating Championships in Torino
  - 500 m winners: (Netherlands) Sjinkie Knegt (m) / (Netherlands) Rianne de Vries (f)
  - 1000 m winners: (Hungary) Sándor Liu Shaolin (m) / (Russia) Sofia Prosvirnova (f)
  - 1500 m winners: (Russia) Semion Elistratov (m) / (Italy) Arianna Fontana (f)
  - 3000 m Superfinal winners: (Russia) Semion Elistratov (m) / (Italy) Arianna Fontana (f)
  - Men's 5000 m relay winners: The Netherlands (Daan Breeuwsma, Sjinkie Knegt, Itzhak de Laat, & Dylan Hoogerwerf)
  - Women's 3000 m relay winners: Italy (Arianna Fontana, Cecilia Maffei, Martina Valcepina, & Lucia Peretti)
- January 27 – 29: 2017 World Junior Short Track Speed Skating Championships in (Austria) Innsbruck
  - 500 m winners: (Hungary) LIU Shaoang (m) / (South Korea) LEE Yu-bin (f)
  - 1000 m winners: (Hungary) LIU Shaoang (m) / (South Korea) LEE Yu-bin (f)
  - 1500 m winners: (Hungary) LIU Shaoang (m) / (South Korea) SEO Whi-min (f)
  - 1500 m Superfinal winners: (South Korea) KIM Si-un / (South Korea) LEE Yu-bin (f)
  - Men's 3000 m relay winners: South Korea (KIM Si-un, MOON Won-jun, PARK Noh-won, & JUNG Hok-young)
  - Women's 3000 m relay winners: China (GONG Li, LI Jinyu, SONG Yang, & LUO Linyun)
- March 10 – 12: 2017 World Short Track Speed Skating Championships in Rotterdam
  - 500 m winners: (Netherlands) Sjinkie Knegt (m) / (China) Fan Kexin (f)
  - 1000 m winners: (South Korea) SEO Yi-ra (m) / (United Kingdom) Elise Christie (f)
  - 1500 m winners: (South Korea) Sin Da-woon (m) / (United Kingdom) Elise Christie (f)
  - 3000 m Superfinal winners: (Netherlands) Sjinkie Knegt (m) / (South Korea) Shim Suk-hee (f)
  - Men's 5000 m relay winners: The Netherlands (Daan Breeuwsma, Sjinkie Knegt, Itzhak de Laat, & Dennis Visser)
  - Women's 3000 m relay winners: China (Fan Kexin, QU Chunyu, Guo Yihan, & ZANG Yize)

== See also ==
- 2017 in skiing
- 2017 in sports
