= 2016–17 ISU Short Track Speed Skating World Cup =

International speed skating competition

ISU Short Track World Cup
- Dates: 2016–17

The 2016–17 ISU Short Track Speed Skating World Cup was a multi-race tournament over a season for short track speed skating. The season began on 5 November 2016 in Canada and ended on 10 February 2017. The World Cup was organised by the ISU who also ran world cups and championships in speed skating and figure skating.

== Calendar ==
=== Men ===
==== Calgary 4–6 November 2016 ====
Date	Place	Distance	Winner	Second	Third	Reference
5 November 2016; 6 November 2016	Calgary Olympic Oval; Calgary Olympic Oval	500m (1); 500m (2)	(Canada) Samuel Girard (Hungary) Sándor Liu Shaolin	(China) Wu Dajing (Russia) Semen Elistratov	(Russia) Victor An (Netherlands) Sjinkie Knegt	
6 November 2016	Calgary Olympic Oval	1000m	(Canada) Charle Cournoyer	(Canada) Samuel Girard	(Hungary) Shaoang Liu	
5 November 2016	Calgary Olympic Oval	1500m	(Netherlands) Sjinkie Knegt	(Israel) Vladislav Bykanov	(Russia) Semen Elistratov	
6 November 2016	Calgary Olympic Oval	5000m relay	Hungary; Shaoang Liu; Sándor Liu Shaolin; Csaba Burjan; Viktor Knoch	(Netherlands) Netherlands; Daan Breeuwsma; Sjinkie Knegt; Dennis Visser; Itzhak de Laat	South Korea; Han Seung-soo; Lee Jung-su; Sin Da-woon; Lim Kyoung-won	

==== Salt Lake City 11–13 November 2016 ====
Date	Place	Distance	Winner	Second	Third	Reference
13 November 2016	Utah Olympic Oval	500m	(Kazakhstan) Abzal Azhgaliyev	(China) Han Tianyu	(Canada) Charles Hamelin	
12 November 2016	Utah Olympic Oval	1000m	(South Korea) Lim Kyoung-won	(South Korea) Hwang Daeheon	(France) Thibaut Fauconnet	
12 November 2016; 13 November 2016	Utah Olympic Oval; Utah Olympic Oval	1500m (1); 1500m (2)	(Canada) Samuel Girard (Netherlands) Sjinkie Knegt WR	(Hungary) Sándor Liu Shaolin (South Korea) Lee Jung-su	(United States) John-Henry Krueger (Russia) Semen Elistratov	
13 November 2016	Utah Olympic Oval	5000m relay	(China) China; Han Tianyu; Xu Hongzhi; Wu Dajing; Ren Ziwei	(Netherlands) Netherlands; Daan Breeuwsma; Sjinkie Knegt; Adwin Snellink; Itzhak de Laat	(Kazakhstan) Kazakhstan; Abzal Azhgaliyev; Aydar Bekzhanov; Nurbergen Zhumagaziyev; Denis Nikisha	

==== Shanghai 9–11 December 2016 ====
Date	Place	Distance	Winner	Second	Third	Reference
10 December 2016; 11 December 2016	Oriental Sports Center; Oriental Sports Center	500m (1); 500m (2)	(China) Wu Dajing (China) Wu Dajing	(Hungary) Liu Shaoang (Hungary) Sándor Liu Shaolin	(Russia) Viktor Ahn (Netherlands) Sjinkie Knegt	
11 December 2016	Oriental Sports Center	1000m	(Hungary) Liu Shaoang	(South Korea) Lim Kyoung-won	(South Korea) Han Seung-soo	
10 December 2016	Oriental Sports Center	1500m	(South Korea) Lee Jung-su	(Russia) Semen Elistratov	(Netherlands) Sjinkie Knegt	
11 December 2016	Oriental Sports Center	5000m relay	China	Netherlands	South Korea	

==== Gangneung 16–18 December 2016 ====
Date	Place	Distance	Winner	Second	Third	Reference
18 December 2016	Gangneung Ice Arena	500m	(China) Wu Dajing	(Kazakhstan) Denis Nikisha	(South Korea) Han Seung-soo	
17 December 2016; 18 December 2016	Gangneung Ice Arena; Gangneung Ice Arena	1000m (1); 1000m (2)	(Kazakhstan) Nurbergen Zhumagaziyev (Canada) Charles Hamelin	(Canada) Pascal Dion (Russia) Semen Elistratov	(Canada) Patrick Duffy (Canada) Charle Cournoyer	
17 December 2016	Gangneung Ice Arena	1500m	(South Korea) Lee Jung-su	(Netherlands) Sjinkie Knegt	(Russia) Semen Elistratov	
18 December 2016	Gangneung Ice Arena	5000m Relay	Hungary	Canada	United States	

==== Dresden 3–5 February 2017 ====
Date	Place	Distance	Winner	Second	Third	Reference
5 February 2017	EnergieVerbund Arena	500m	(Hungary) Shaolin Sándor Liu	(South Korea) Hwang Dae-heon	(Hungary) Liu Shaoang	
5 February 2017	EnergieVerbund Arena	1000m	(France) Thibaut Fauconnet	(South Korea) Hwang Dae-heon	(United States) J. R. Celski	
5 February 2017	EnergieVerbund Arena	1500m (1); 1500m (2)	(Canada) Charles Hamelin (Netherlands) Sjinkie Knegt	(South Korea) Hong Kyung-hwan (Hungary) Csaba Burjan	(Russia) Alexander Shulginov (Israel) Vladislav Bykanov	
5 February 2017	EnergieVerbund Arena	5000m relay	Russia	Netherlands	South Korea	

==== Minsk 10–12 February 2017 ====
Date	Place	Distance	Winner	Second	Third	Reference
12 February 2017	Minsk-Arena	500m	(Kazakhstan) Denis Nikisha	(Kazakhstan) Abzal Azhgaliyev	(Canada) Francois Hamelin	
12 February 2017	Minsk-Arena	1000m	(South Korea) Hwang Dae-heon	(Netherlands) Sjinkie Knegt	(Kazakhstan) Nurbergen Zhumagaziyev	
12 February 2017	Minsk-Arena	1500m	(South Korea) Lee Hyo-been	(South Korea) Hong Kyung-hwan	(South Korea) Lim Yong-jin	
12 February 2017	Minsk-Arena	5000m relay	Netherlands	Russia	Kazakhstan	

=== Women ===
==== Calgary 4–6 November 2016 ====
Date	Place	Distance	Winner	Second	Third	Reference
5 November 2016; 6 November 2016	Calgary Olympic Oval; Calgary Olympic Oval	500m (1); 500m (2)	(China) Fan Kexin (United Kingdom) Elise Christie	(Canada) Marianne St-Gelais (Canada) Jamie Macdonald	(Italy) Arianna Fontana (Netherlands) Yara van Kerkhof	
6 November 2016	Calgary Olympic Oval	1000m	(South Korea) Choi Min-jeong	(South Korea) Shim Suk-hee	(Netherlands) Suzanne Schulting	
5 November 2016	Calgary Olympic Oval	1500m	(South Korea) Shim Suk-hee	(South Korea) Choi Min-jeong	(Netherlands) Suzanne Schulting	
6 November 2016	Calgary Olympic Oval	3000m relay	South Korea; Noh Do-hee; Kim Geon-hee; Choi Min-jeong; Shim Suk-hee	(Netherlands) Netherlands; Yara van Kerkhof; Rianne de Vries; Suzanne Schulting; Lara van Ruijven	(Hungary) Hungary; Sara Luca Bacskai; Petra Jaszapati; Zsófia Kónya; Andrea Keszler	

==== Salt Lake City 11–13 November 2016 ====
Date	Place	Distance	Winner	Second	Third	Reference
13 November 2016	Utah Olympic Oval	500m	(Canada) Marianne St-Gelais	(South Korea) Choi Min-jeong	(China) Fan Kexin	
12 November 2016	Utah Olympic Oval	1000m	(South Korea) Kim Jiyoo	(Netherlands) Suzanne Schulting	(Hungary) Zsófia Kónya	
12 November 2016; 13 November 2016	Utah Olympic Oval; Utah Olympic Oval	1500m (1); 1500m (2)	(South Korea) Choi Min-jeong (South Korea) Shim Suk-hee	(Canada) Marianne St-Gelais (South Korea) Kim Jiyoo	(Canada) Marie-Ève Drolet (South Korea) Noh Do-hee	
13 November 2016	Utah Olympic Oval	3000m relay	South Korea; Noh Do-hee; Kim Jiyoo; Choi Min-jeong; Shim Suk-hee	(Netherlands) Netherlands; Yara van Kerkhof; Rianne de Vries; Suzanne Schulting; Jorien ter Mors	(Canada) Canada; Marianne St-Gelais; Kim Boutin; Kasandra Bradette; Marie-Ève Drolet	

==== Shanghai 9–11 December 2016 ====
Date	Place	Distance	Winner	Second	Third	Reference
10 December 2016; 11 December 2016	Oriental Sports Center; Oriental Sports Center	500m (1); 500m (2)	(United Kingdom) Elise Christie (United Kingdom) Elise Christie	(South Korea) Choi Min-jeong (Italy) Arianna Fontana	(Canada) Marianne St-Gelais (Poland) Natalia Maliszewska	
11 December 2016	Oriental Sports Center	1000m	(South Korea) Choi Min-jeong	(South Korea) Kim Jiyoo	(Netherlands) Suzanne Schulting	
10 December 2016	Oriental Sports Center	1500m	(South Korea) Shim Suk-hee	(South Korea) Kim Jiyoo	(Netherlands) Suzanne Schulting	
11 December 2016	Oriental Sports Center	3000m relay	South Korea	Canada	Netherlands	

==== Gangneung 16–18 December 2016 ====
Date	Place	Distance	Winner	Second	Third	Reference
18 December 2016	Gangneung Ice Arena	500m	(South Korea) Choi Min-jeong	(China) Fan Kexin	(Poland) Natalia Maliszewska	
17 December 2016; 18 December 2016	Gangneung Ice Arena; Gangneung Ice Arena	1000m (1); 1000m (2)	(United Kingdom) Elise Christie (United Kingdom) Elise Christie	(South Korea) Choi Min-jeong (China) Guo Yihan	(Canada) Marie-Ève Drolet (South Korea) Shim Suk-hee	
17 December 2016	Gangneung Ice Arena	1500m	(South Korea) Shim Suk-hee	(Canada) Marianne St-Gelais	(Canada) Kim Boutin	
18 December 2016	Gangneung Ice Arena	3000m relay	South Korea	Netherlands	Canada	

==== Dresden 3–5 February 2017 ====
Date	Place	Distance	Winner	Second	Third	Reference
5 February 2017	EnergieVerbund Arena	500m	(Canada) Marianne St-Gelais	(South Korea) Kim Ye-jin	(Canada) Jamie MacDonald	
5 February 2017	EnergieVerbund Arena	1000m	(Canada) Marianne St-Gelais	(Netherlands) Suzanne Schulting	(Canada) Valérie Maltais	
5 February 2017	EnergieVerbund Arena	1500m (1); 1500m (2)	(Canada) Kim Boutin (Netherlands) Suzanne Schulting	(Netherlands) Rianne de Vries (South Korea) Noh Ah-rum	(United Kingdom) Charlotte Gilmartin (Canada) Valérie Maltais	
5 February 2017	EnergieVerbund Arena	3000m relay	Netherlands	Italy	Canada	

==== Minsk 10–12 February 2017 ====
Date	Place	Distance	Winner	Second	Third	Reference
12 February 2017	Minsk-Arena	500m	(South Korea) Kim Ye-jin	(Italy) Arianna Fontana	(Netherlands) Yara van Kerkhof	
12 February 2017	Minsk-Arena	1000m	(China) Liu Yang	(Japan) Shione Kaminaga	(Italy) Cynthia Mascitto	
12 February 2017	Minsk-Arena	1500m	(South Korea) Noh Ah-rum	(Russia) Ekaterina Efremenkova	(Italy) Lucia Peretti	
12 February 2017	Minsk-Arena	3000m relay	Russia	Italy	South Korea	

== World Cup standings ==
=== Men's 500 metres ===
Final standings after 8 events

Pos	Athlete	Points
1.	Wu Dajing (CHN)	38001
2.	Abzal Azhgaliyev (KAZ)	34433
3.	Sándor Liu Shaolin (HUN)	33774
4.	Denis Nikisha (KAZ)	23420
5.	Samuel Girard (CAN)	20632

=== Women's 500 metres ===
Final standings after 8 events

Pos	Athlete	Points
1.	Marianne St-Gelais (CAN)	37021
2.	Elise Christie (GBR)	35264
3.	Fan Kexin (CHN)	33616
4.	Arianna Fontana (ITA)	33213
5.	Choi Min-jeong (KOR)	26000

=== Men's 1000 metres ===
Final standings after 8 events

Pos	Athlete	Points
1.	Shaoang Liu (HUN)	28669
2.	Thibaut Fauconnet (FRA)	27517
3.	Nurbergen Zhumagaziyev (KAZ)	27486
4.	Hwang Daeheon (KOR)	26000
5.	Lim Kyoung-won (KOR)	22619

=== Women's 1000 metres ===
Final standings after 8 events

Pos	Athlete	Points
1.	Suzanne Schulting (NED)	29198
2.	Choi Min-jeong (KOR)	28000
3.	Elise Christie (GBR)	21678
4.	Kim Jiyoo (KOR)	19678
5.	Valerie Maltais (CAN)	19566

=== Men's 1500 metres ===
Final standings after 8 events

Pos	Athlete	Points
1.	Sjinkie Knegt (NED)	44400
2.	Lee Jung-su (KOR)	35217
3.	Semen Elistratov (RUS)	28059
4.	John-Henry Krueger (USA)	24431
5.	Vladislav Bykanov (ISR)	24311

=== Women's 1500 metres ===
Final standings after 8 events

Pos	Athlete	Points
1.	Shim Suk-hee (KOR)	40000
2.	Suzanne Schulting (NED)	25716
3.	Kim Boutin (CAN)	24747
4.	Charlotte Gilmartin (GBR)	22597
5.	Ekaterina Efremenkova (RUS)	21688

=== Men's 5000 metre relay ===
Final standings after 6 events

Pos	Athlete	Points
1	Netherlands	34000
2	Hungary	30240
3	China	30240
4	Russia	26192
5	South Korea	23296

=== Women's 3000 metre relay ===
Final standings after 6 events

Pos	Athlete	Points
1	South Korea	40000
2	Netherlands	34000
3	Canada	27200
4	Italy	24192
5	China	19456

=== Men's overall ===
Final standings after events

Pos	Athlete	Points
1	Netherlands
2	Canada
3	China
4	Russia
5	Canada

=== Women's overall ===
Final standings after events

Pos	Athlete	Points
1	South Korea
2	United Kingdom
3	South Korea
4	Canada
5	Canada

=== Medal table ===
Rank	Nation	Gold	Silver	Bronze	Total
1	South Korea	16	15	6	37
2	Canada	9	9	11	29
3	China	6	4	1	11
4	Hungary	5	4	4	13
5	Great Britain	5	0	1	6
6	Netherlands	4	10	9	23
7	Kazakhstan	2	1	1	4
8	Russia	1	3	6	10
9	France	1	0	1	2
10	Italy	0	1	1	2
11	Israel	0	1	0	1
12	United States	0	0	3	3
13	Poland	0	0	2	2
14	Japan	0	0	1	1
Totals (14 entries)		49	48	47	144

- After Dresden

== See also ==
- 2017 World Short Track Speed Skating Championships
