= Short-track speed skating at the 2018 Winter Olympics – Women's 3000 metre relay =

Women’s 3000 metre relay at the XXIII Olympic Winter Games
- Venue: Gangneung Ice Arena; Gangneung, South Korea
- Dates: 10 February 2018 (semifinals); 20 February 2018 (finals)
- Competitors: 37 from 8 nations
- Winning time: 4:07.361 OR

Medalists
1st place, gold medalist(s)		Shim Suk-hee; Choi Min-jeong; Kim Ye-jin; Kim A-lang; Lee Yu-bin	South Korea
2nd place, silver medalist(s)		Arianna Fontana; Lucia Peretti; Cecilia Maffei; Martina Valcepina	Italy
3rd place, bronze medalist(s)		Suzanne Schulting; Yara van Kerkhof; Lara van Ruijven; Jorien ter Mors	Netherlands

The Women's 3000 metre relay in short track speed skating at the 2018 Winter Olympics took place on 10 and 20 February 2018 at the Gangneung Ice Arena in Gangneung, South Korea.

== Records ==
Prior to this competition, the existing world and Olympic records were as follows.

World record	South Korea; Choi Min-jeong; Kim Geon-hee; Kim Ji-yoo; Shim Suk-hee	4:04.222	Salt Lake City, United States	12 November 2016
Olympic record	China; Sun Linlin; Wang Meng; Zhang Hui; Zhou Yang	4:06.610	Vancouver, Canada	24 February 2010

Two Olympic records and one world record were set during the competition.

Date	Round	Athlete	Country	Time	Record	Ref
10 February	Semifinal 2	Fan Kexin; Han Yutong; Qu Chunyu; Zhou Yang	China	4:05.315	OR	
20 February	Final B	Suzanne Schulting; Yara van Kerkhof; Lara van Ruijven; Jorien ter Mors	Netherlands	4:03.471	WR, OR	

== Results ==
=== Semifinals ===
The semifinals were held on 10 February.

Rank	Semifinal	Country	Athletes	Time	Notes
1	1	South Korea	Shim Suk-hee; Choi Min-jeong; Kim Ye-jin; Lee Yu-bin	4:06.387	QA
2	1	Canada	Marianne St-Gelais; Kim Boutin; Jamie Macdonald; Kasandra Bradette	4:07.627	QA
3	1	Hungary	Petra Jászapáti; Andrea Keszler; Sára Bácskai; Bernadett Heidum	4:09.555	QB
4	1	Olympic Athletes from Russia	Sofia Prosvirnova; Ekaterina Konstantinova; Ekaterina Efremenkova; Emina Malagich	4:21.973	QB
1	2	China	Fan Kexin; Han Yutong; Qu Chunyu; Zhou Yang	4:05.315	QA, OR
2	2	Italy	Arianna Fontana; Lucia Peretti; Cecilia Maffei; Martina Valcepina	4:05.918	QA
3	2	Netherlands	Suzanne Schulting; Yara van Kerkhof; Lara van Ruijven; Jorien ter Mors	4:05.977	QB
4	2	Japan	Hitomi Saito; Sumire Kikuchi; Ayuko Ito; Yuki Kikuchi	4:12.664	QB

=== Finals ===
==== Final B (classification round) ====
Rank	Country	Athletes	Time	Notes
3rd place, bronze medalist(s)	Netherlands	Suzanne Schulting; Yara van Kerkhof; Lara van Ruijven; Jorien ter Mors	4:03.471	OR, WR
4	Hungary	Petra Jászapáti; Andrea Keszler; Sára Bácskai; Zsófia Kónya	4:03.603	
5	Olympic Athletes from Russia	Sofia Prosvirnova; Ekaterina Konstantinova; Ekaterina Efremenkova; Emina Malagich	4:08.838	
6	Japan	Hitomi Saito; Sumire Kikuchi; Shione Kaminaga; Yuki Kikuchi	4:13.072	

==== Final A (medal round) ====
The final was started at 20:29.

Rank	Country	Athletes	Time	Notes
1st place, gold medalist(s)	South Korea	Shim Suk-hee; Choi Min-jeong; Kim Ye-jin; Kim A-lang	4:07.361	
2nd place, silver medalist(s)	Italy	Arianna Fontana; Lucia Peretti; Cecilia Maffei; Martina Valcepina	4:15.901	
7	China	Fan Kexin; Li Jinyu; Qu Chunyu; Zhou Yang		PEN
8	Canada	Marianne St-Gelais; Kim Boutin; Valérie Maltais; Kasandra Bradette		PEN
