= 2013 European Short Track Speed Skating Championships =

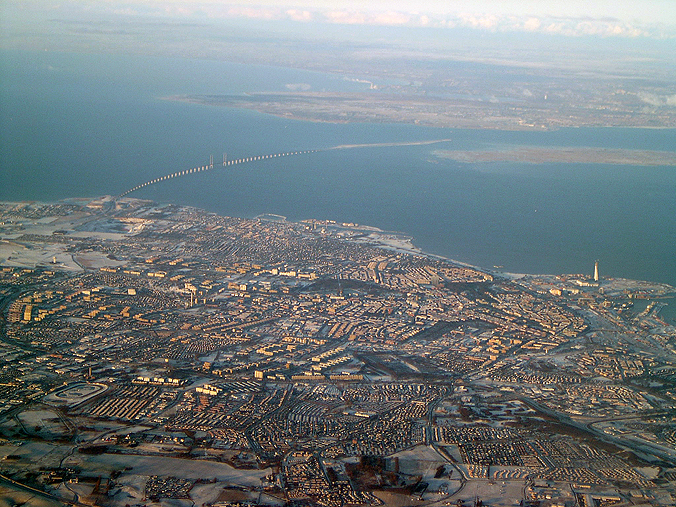
- Malmö in 2006
- Venue: Malmö Arena, Malmö, Sweden
- Dates: 18–20 January
- Competitors: 123 from 25 nations

The 2013 European Short Track Speed Skating Championships took place between 18 and 20 January 2013 at the Malmö Arena in Malmö, Sweden.

== Schedule ==
All times are local (UTC+1).

Date	Time	Event
18 January	15:40	Women's 1500 m heats
18 January	16:07	Men's 1500 m heats
18 January	17:20	Women's 1500 m semi finals
18 January	17:35	Men's 1500 m semi finals
18 January	18:05	Women's 1500 m final
18 January	18:15	Men's 1500 m final
18 January	19:30	Women's 3000 m relay heats
18 January	20:06	Men's 5000 m relay heats
19 January	12:30	Women's 500 m preliminaries
19 January	13:09	Men's 500 m preliminaries
19 January	13:57	Women's 500 m heats
19 January	14:14	Men's 500 m heats
19 January	15:20	Women's 500 m quarter finals
19 January	15:31	Men's 500 m quarter finals
19 January	15:57	Women's 500 m semi finals
19 January	16:03	Men's 500 m semi finals
19 January	16:24	Women's 1500 m final
19 January	16:32	Men's 1500 m final
19 January	16:55	Women's 3000 m relay semi finals
19 January	17:10	Men's 5000 m relay semi finals
20 January	12:15	Women's 1000 m heats
20 January	12:44	Men's 1000 m heats
20 January	13:36	Women's 1000 m quarter finals
20 January	13:50	Men's 1000 m quarter finals
20 January	14:50	Women's 1000 m semi finals
20 January	14:58	Men's 1000 m semi finals
20 January	15:21	Women's 1000 m final
20 January	15:30	Men's 1000 m final
20 January	15:54	Women's 3000 m super final
20 January	16:01	Men's 3000 m super final
20 January	16:24	Women's 3000 m relay final
20 January	16:31	Men's 5000 m relay final

== Medal summary ==
=== Medal table ===
Rank	Nation	Gold	Silver	Bronze	Total
1	Netherlands	4	5	2	11
2	Italy	2	2	1	5
3	Russia	2	1	3	6
4	Great Britain	2	1	1	4
5	Germany	0	1	0	1
6	Poland	0	0	2	2
7	Hungary	0	0	1	1
Totals (7 entries)		10	10	10	30

=== Men's events ===
Event	Gold		Silver		Bronze	
500 metres	Vladimir Grigorev (RUS)	41.330	Sjinkie Knegt (NED)	41.407	Viktor An (RUS)	41.432
1000 metres	Freek van der Wart (NED)	1:26.627	Viktor An (RUS)	1:26.787	Semion Elistratov (RUS)	1:26.978
1500 metres	Sjinkie Knegt (NED)	2:18.474	Niels Kerstholt (NED)	2:21.101	Yuri Confortola (ITA)	2:21.212
5000 metre relay	Russia; Evgeny Kozulin; Viktor An; Semion Elistratov; Vladimir Grigorev	6:51.293	Netherlands; Sjinkie Knegt; Freek van der Wart; Daan Breeuwsma; Niels Kerstholt	6:51.465	Hungary; Viktor Knoch; Bence Béres; Shaolin Sándor Liu; Csaba Burján	7:02.574
Overall Classification	Freek van der Wart (NED)	84 pts.	Sjinkie Knegt (NED)	76 pts.	Vladimir Grigorev (RUS)	41 pts.

=== Women's events ===
Event	Gold		Silver		Bronze	
500 metres	Arianna Fontana (ITA)	44.961	Jorien ter Mors (NED)	45.015	Patrycja Maliszewska (POL)	45.208
1000 metres	Elise Christie (GBR)	1:30.445	Arianna Fontana (ITA)	1:30.742	Jorien ter Mors (NED)	1:30.757
1500 metres	Elise Christie (GBR)	2:26.987	Arianna Fontana (ITA)	2:27.268	Charlotte Gilmartin (GBR)	2:28.043
3000 metre relay	Netherlands; Yara van Kerkhof; Jorien ter Mors; Lara van Ruijven; Sanne van Kerkhof	4:18.569	Germany; Tina Grassow; Christin Priebst; Julia Riedel; Bianca Walter	4:18.692	Poland; Natalia Maliszewska; Patrycja Maliszewska; Aida Bella; Paula Bzura	4:19.794
Overall Classification	Arianna Fontana (ITA)	110 pts.	Elise Christie (GBR)	70 pts.	Jorien ter Mors (NED)	60 pts.

== Participating nations ==
- Austria (1)
- Belarus (10)
- Bosnia and Herzegovina (1)
- Bulgaria (9)
- Czech Republic (2)
- Denmark (1)
- France (5)
- Germany (10)
- Great Britain (9)
- Hungary (10)
- Israel (1)
- Italy (10)
- Latvia (2)
- Lithuania (1)
- Netherlands (10)
- Poland (10)
- Romania (4)
- Russia (10)
- Serbia (1)
- Slovakia (1)
- Spain (2)
- Sweden (1)
- Switzerland (1)
- Turkey (2)
- Ukraine (9)

== See also ==
- Short track speed skating
- European Short Track Speed Skating Championships
