= 2012 European Short Track Speed Skating Championships =

- Venue: Mladá Boleslav, Czech Republic
- Dates: 27–29 January

The 2012 European Short Track Speed Skating Championships took place between 27 and 29 January 2012 in Mladá Boleslav, Czech Republic.

The original bronze medalist in men's overall competition was Thibaut Fauconnet of France but he was later disqualified for doping offence.

== Medal summary ==
=== Medal table ===
Rank	Nation	Gold	Silver	Bronze	Total
1	Netherlands	6	3	1	10
2	Italy	3	2	2	7
3	Russia	1	3	1	5
4	Hungary	0	1	2	3
5	Great Britain	0	1	1	2
6	Germany	0	0	2	2
7	France	0	0	1	1
Totals (7 entries)		10	10	10	30

=== Men's events ===
Event	Gold		Silver		Bronze	
500 metres	Vladimir Grigorev (RUS)	41.798	Jack Whelbourne (GBR)	42.828	Jon Eley (GBR)	42.970
1000 metres	Sjinkie Knegt (NED)	1:28.472	Evgeny Kozulin (RUS)	1:28.751	Paul Herrmann (GER)	1:29.088
1500 metres	Sjinkie Knegt (NED)	2:15.303	Semion Elistratov (RUS)	2:15.428	Niels Kerstholt (NED)	2:15.578
5000 metre relay	Netherlands; Niels Kerstholt; Daan Breeuwsma; Freek van der Wart; Sjinkie Knegt; Christiaan Bökk	6:46.675	Russia; Vyacheslav Kurginyan; Vladimir Grigorev; Evgeny Kozulin; Semion Elistratov; Ruslan Zakharov	6:47.864	Germany; Paul Herrmann; Torsten Kröger; Robert Becker; Daniel Zetzsche; Robert Seifert	6:53.149
Overall Classification	Sjinkie Knegt (NED)	63 pts.	Niels Kerstholt (NED)	47 pts.	Semion Elistratov (RUS)	42 pts.

=== Women's events ===
Event	Gold		Silver		Bronze	
500 metres	Arianna Fontana (ITA)	43.725	Martina Valcepina (ITA)	43.801	Andrea Keszler (HUN)	1:01.011
1000 metres	Jorien ter Mors (NED)	1:30.544	Bernadett Heidum (HUN)	1:30.646	Véronique Pierron (FRA)	1:30.708
1500 metres	Arianna Fontana (ITA)	2:28.082	Jorien ter Mors (NED)	2:28.576	Martina Valcepina (ITA)	2:28.812
3000 metre relay	Netherlands; Yara van Kerkhof; Jorien ter Mors; Annita van Doorn; Sanne van Kerkhof	4:15.392	Italy; Cecilia Maffei; Arianna Valcepina; Arianna Fontana; Martina Valcepina; Elena Viviani	4:15.406	Hungary; Patrícia Tóth; Andrea Keszler; Szandra Lajtos; Bernadett Heidum	4:16.767
Overall Classification	Arianna Fontana (ITA)	107 pts.	Jorien ter Mors (NED)	76 pts.	Martina Valcepina (ITA)	43 pts.

== Participating nations ==
- Austria
- Belarus
- Belgium
- Bosnia and Herzegovina
- Bulgaria
- Croatia
- Czech Republic
- Denmark
- France
- Germany
- Great Britain
- Hungary
- Israel
- Italy
- Latvia
- Lithuania
- Netherlands
- Poland
- Romania
- Russia
- Serbia
- Slovakia
- Spain
- Switzerland
- Turkey
- Ukraine

== See also ==
- Short track speed skating
- European Short Track Speed Skating Championships
