= 2014 European Short Track Speed Skating Championships =

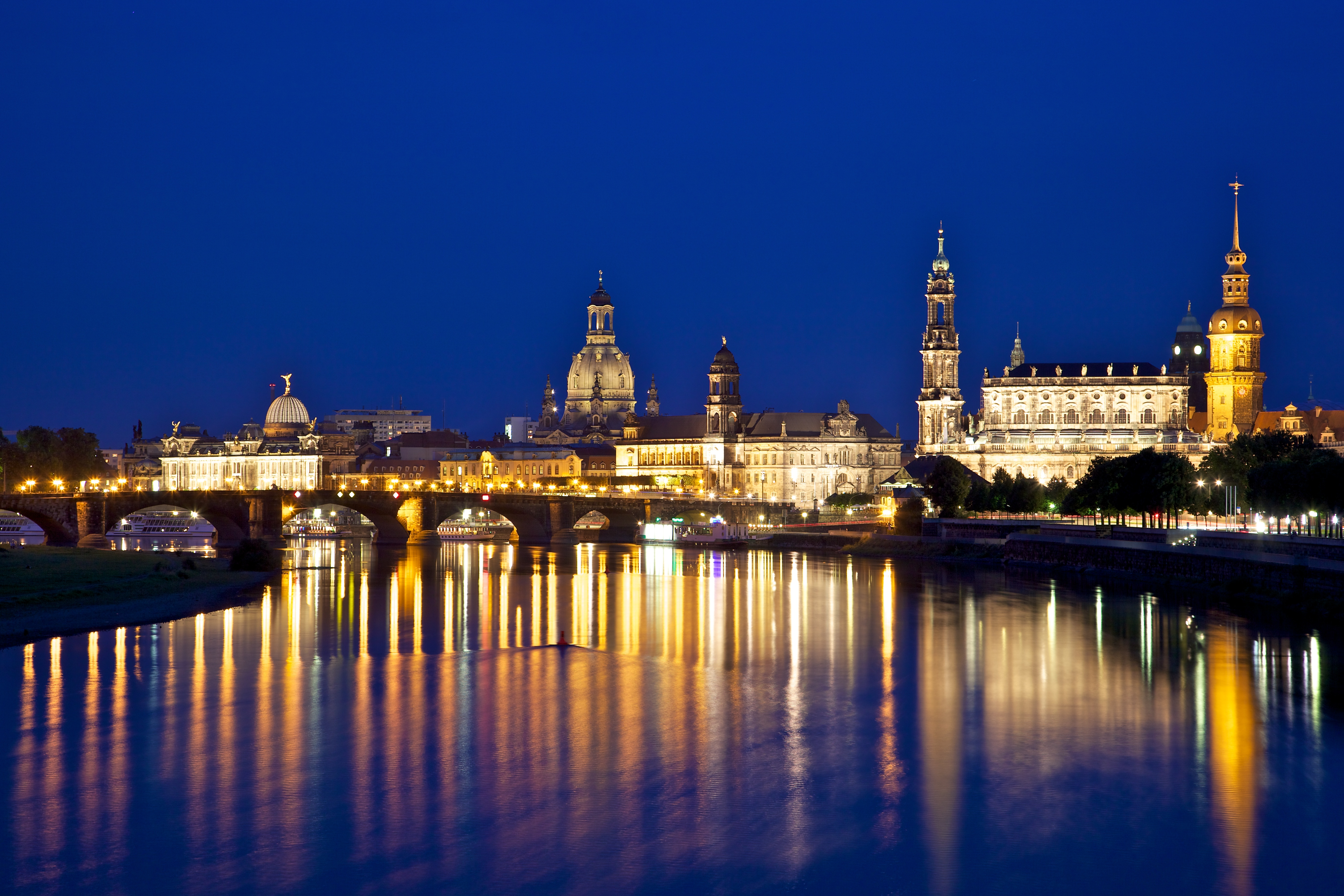
- Dresden in 2011
- Venue: Dresden, Germany
- Dates: 17–19 January

The 2014 European Short Track Speed Skating Championships took place between 17 and 19 January 2014 in Dresden, Germany.

== Medal summary ==
=== Medal table ===
* Host nation (Germany)

Rank	Nation	Gold	Silver	Bronze	Total
1	Russia	5	3	3	11
2	Netherlands	3	4	3	10
3	Great Britain	1	2	0	3
4	Italy	1	0	1	2
5	Hungary	0	1	2	3
6	Germany*	0	0	1	1
Totals (6 entries)		10	10	10	30

=== Men's events ===
Event	Gold		Silver		Bronze	
500 metres	Viktor An (RUS)	40.644	Sjinkie Knegt (NED)	40.734	Vladimir Grigorev (RUS)	40.920
1000 metres	Viktor An (RUS)	1:24.940	Semion Elistratov (RUS)	1:25.215	Vladimir Grigorev (RUS)	1:25.322
1500 metres	Semion Elistratov (RUS)	2:14.541	Niels Kerstholt (NED)	2:14.734	Freek van der Wart (NED)	2:15.650
5000 metre relay	Russia; Dmitry Migunov; Viktor An; Semion Elistratov; Vladimir Grigorev; Ruslan Zakharov	6:45.803	Netherlands; Sjinkie Knegt; Freek van der Wart; Daan Breeuwsma; Niels Kerstholt; Christiaan Bokkerink	6:46.072	Germany; Paul Herrmann; Robert Seifert; Christoph Schubert; Daniel Zetzsche; Jonas Kaufmann-Ludwig	6:48.313
Overall Classification	Viktor An (RUS)	102 pts.	Semion Elistratov (RUS)	60 pts.	Niels Kerstholt (NED)	34 pts.

=== Women's events ===
Event	Gold		Silver		Bronze	
500 metres	Arianna Fontana (ITA)	43.885	Tatiana Borodulina (RUS)	43.923	Jorien ter Mors (NED)	44.233
1000 metres	Elise Christie (GBR)	1:30.489	Jorien ter Mors (NED)	1:30.557	Tatiana Borodulina (RUS)	1:30.650
1500 metres	Jorien ter Mors (NED)	2:35.748	Bernadett Heidum (HUN)	2:36.574	Zsófia Kónya (HUN)	2:36.762
3000 metre relay	Netherlands; Yara van Kerkhof; Jorien ter Mors; Lara van Ruijven; Sanne van Kerkhof	4:14.147	Great Britain; Elise Christie; Alex Stanley; Charlotte Gilmartin; Kathryn Thomson	4:15.497	Hungary; Bernadett Heidum; Szandra Lajtos; Andrea Keszler; Zsófia Kónya	4:15.873
Overall Classification	Jorien ter Mors (NED)	107 pts.	Elise Christie (GBR)	63 pts.	Arianna Fontana (ITA)	52 pts.

== Participating nations ==
- Austria
- Belarus
- Bosnia and Herzegovina
- Bulgaria
- Czech Republic
- Denmark
- France
- Germany
- Great Britain
- Hungary
- Israel
- Italy
- Latvia
- Lithuania
- Netherlands
- Poland
- Romania
- Russia
- Serbia
- Slovakia
- Spain
- Sweden
- Switzerland
- Turkey
- Ukraine

== See also ==
- Short track speed skating
- European Short Track Speed Skating Championships
