= Ye-jin =

- Hangul: 예진
- RR: Yejin
- MR: Yejin

Ye-jin is a Korean given name.

People with this name include:

- Im Ye-jin (born Im Ki-hee, 1960), South Korean actress
- Park Ye-jin (born 1981), South Korean actress
- Son Ye-jin (born Son Eon-jin, 1982), South Korean actress
- Ailee (Korean name Lee Yejin, born 1989), Korean-American singer and songwriter
- Pyo Ye-jin (born 1992), South Korean actress
- Kim Ye-jin (born 1999), South Korean short track speed skater
- Chu Ye-jin (born 2001), South Korean actress

== See also ==
- List of Korean given names
