= Patrycja Maliszewska =

Polish speed skater

Personal information
- Born: 12 March 1988 (age 38) Białystok, Poland
- Height: 1.72 m (5 ft 8 in)
- Weight: 62 kg (137 lb)

Sport
- Country: Poland
- Sport: Short track speed skating

Achievements and titles
- Personal best(s): 500 m: 43.269; 1000 m: 1:30.698; 1500 m: 2:25.586; 3000 m: 5:23.622
Medal record
Women's short track speed skating
Representing Poland
European Championships
Gold medal – first place	2015 Dordrecht	3000 m
Silver medal – second place	2011 Heerenveen	500 m
Bronze medal – third place	2013 Malmö	500 m
Bronze medal – third place	2013 Malmö	3000 m relay
Bronze medal – third place	2015 Dordrecht	500 m
Bronze medal – third place	2015 Dordrecht	overall

Patrycja Maliszewska (born 12 March 1988 in Białystok) is a Polish short-track speed-skater.

== Career ==
Maliszewska competed at the 2010 Winter Olympics for Poland. She finished fourth in the first round of the 500 metres and sixth in the first round of the 1500 metres, failing to advance. She finished 29th in each of her events.

As of 2013, Maliszewska's best finish at the World Championships is 10th, in the 500 metres in 2013. She also has one bronze medal as a member of the Polish relay team at the 2013 European Championships

As of 2013, Maliszewska has not finished on the podium on the ISU Short Track Speed Skating World Cup. Her top World Cup ranking is 9th, in the 500 metres in 2010–11.

The year 2015 for Maliszewska was the best performance at the European Championships in her career where she won three medals (gold and two bronze).

== Personal life ==
Her younger sister Natalia Maliszewska is also a short track speed skater.

== See also ==
- Sport in Poland
