= Rianne de Vries =

Dutch short track speed skater

Personal information
- Nationality: Dutch
- Born: 14 December 1990 (age 35) Heerenveen, Netherlands
- Height: 168 cm (5 ft 6 in)
- Weight: 58 kg (128 lb)

Sport
- Country: Netherlands
- Sport: Short track speed skating
- Club: Shorttrack Club Thialf
Medal record
Women's short-track speed skating
Representing the Netherlands
World Championships
Gold medal – first place	2021 Dordrecht	3000 m relay
Silver medal – second place	2018 Montreal	3000 m relay
Bronze medal – third place	2022 Montreal	3000 m relay
European Championships
Gold medal – first place	2016 Sochi	3000 m relay
Gold medal – first place	2017 Turin	500 m
Gold medal – first place	2019 Dordrecht	3000 m relay
Gold medal – first place	2020 Debrecen	3000 m relay
Silver medal – second place	2015 Dordrecht	3000 m relay
Silver medal – second place	2021 Gdańsk	3000 m relay
Bronze medal – third place	2017 Turin	3000 m relay

Rianne de Vries (born 14 December 1990) is a Dutch short track speed skater.

== Sporting career ==
=== Olympic Games ===
She was selected for the 3000 metre relay team at the 2014 Winter Olympics but didn't compete. She was also selected for the 3000 metre relay team at the 2018 Winter Olympics, but again did not compete.

=== World Championships ===
She competed in the 3000 metre relay event at the 2016 World Short Track Speed Skating Championships in Seoul, South Korea.

=== European Championships ===
De Vries competed at the 2017 European Short Track Speed Skating Championships in the 500-metre and 3000 metre relay events, winning a gold and bronze medal respectively.

== Personal life ==
De Vries started speed skating when she was a child and started doing short track speed skating in 2009. In July 2017 she broke her right ankle during a training.

She studies Sport at the CIOS in Heerenveen.

Her partner is short track speed skater Daan Breeuwsma. He competed at the relay event at the 2014 Winter Olympics.
