= 2020 European Short Track Speed Skating Championships =

2020 European Championships
- Venue: Főnix Hall
- Location: Debrecen, Hungary
- Dates: 24–26 January
- Competitors: 136 from 24 nations

The 2020 European Short Track Speed Skating Championships were held from 24 to 26 January 2020 at the Főnix Hall in Debrecen, Hungary.

== Medal summary ==
=== Medal table ===
* Host nation (Hungary)

| Rank | Nation | Gold | Silver | Bronze | Total |
|---|---|---|---|---|---|
| 1 | Netherlands (NED) | 5 | 3 | 0 | 8 |
| 2 | Hungary (HUN)* | 4 | 3 | 0 | 7 |
| 3 | Russia (RUS) | 1 | 0 | 4 | 5 |
| 4 | Italy (ITA) | 0 | 4 | 3 | 7 |
| 5 | Germany (GER) | 0 | 0 | 1 | 1 |
| 5 | Israel (ISR) | 0 | 0 | 1 | 1 |
| 5 | Poland (POL) | 0 | 0 | 1 | 1 |
| Totals (7 entries) | | 10 | 10 | 10 | 30 |

=== Men's events ===
| Event | Gold | | Silver | | Bronze | |
|---|---|---|---|---|---|---|
| 500 m | Shaolin Sándor Liu; Hungary | 41.244 | Shaoang Liu; Hungary | 41.517 | Semion Elistratov; Russia | 41.686 |
| 1000 m | Shaolin Sándor Liu; Hungary | 1:25.636 | Shaoang Liu; Hungary | 1:25.667 | Semion Elistratov; Russia | 1:25.831 |
| 1500 m | Shaoang Liu; Hungary | 2:25.871 | Itzhak de Laat; Netherlands | 2:25.960 | Vladislav Bykanov; Israel | 2:26.075 |
| 5000 m relay | Russia; Denis Ayrapetyan; Semion Elistratov; Daniil Eybog; Pavel Sitnikov; Aleksandr Shulginov | 7:06.884 | Netherlands; Daan Breeuwsma; Itzhak de Laat; Sven Roes; Dennis Visser; Dylan Hoogerwerf | 7:06.984 | Italy; Mattia Antonioli; Andrea Cassinelli; Yuri Confortola; Tommaso Dotti; Marco Giordano | 7:07.055 |
| Overall Classification | Shaoang Liu Hungary | 77 pts | Shaolin Sándor Liu Hungary | 75 pts | Semion Elistratov Russia | 65 pts |

=== Women's events ===
| Event | Gold | | Silver | | Bronze | |
|---|---|---|---|---|---|---|
| 500 m | Suzanne Schulting; Netherlands | 43.442 | Martina Valcepina; Italy | 43.568 | Natalia Maliszewska; Poland | 43.709 |
| 1000 m | Suzanne Schulting; Netherlands | 1:33.353 | Lara van Ruijven; Netherlands | 1:33.464 | Arianna Fontana; Italy | 1:33.596 |
| 1500 m | Suzanne Schulting; Netherlands | 2:35.915 | Arianna Fontana; Italy | 2:36.134 | Anna Seidel; Germany | 2:36.319 |
| 3000 m relay | Netherlands; Rianne de Vries; Suzanne Schulting; Yara van Kerkhof; Lara van Ruijven | 4:12.877 | Italy; Nicole Botter Gomez; Arianna Fontana; Cynthia Mascitto; Martina Valcepina; Arianna Sighel | 4:13.022 | Russia; Ekaterina Efremenkova; Ekaterina Konstantinova; Emina Malagich; Sofia Prosvirnova; Evgeniya Zakharova | 4:25.577 |
| Overall Classification | Suzanne Schulting Netherlands | 102 pts | Arianna Fontana Italy | 68 pts | Martina Valcepina Italy | 34 pts |
