= 2017 European Short Track Speed Skating Championships =

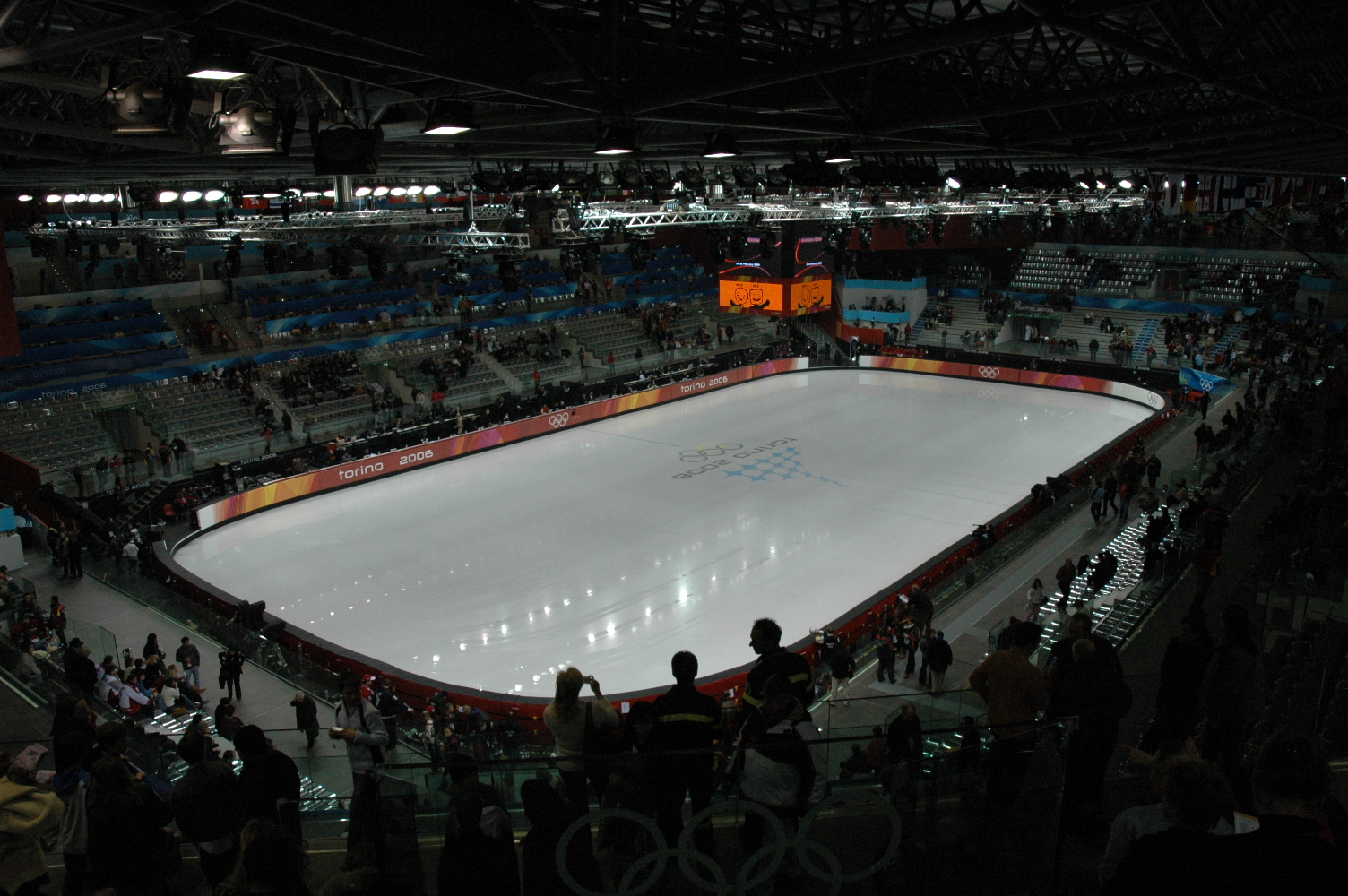
- Venue: Torino Palavela, Turin, Italy
- Dates: 13–15 January
- Competitors: 81 from 28 nations

The 2017 European Short Track Speed Skating Championships took place from 13–15 January 2017 in Turin, Italy.

== Medal summary ==
=== Medal table ===
* Host nation (Italy)

Rank	Nation	Gold	Silver	Bronze	Total
1	Russia (RUS)	3	3	4	10
2	Italy (ITA)*	3	1	2	6
2	Netherlands (NED)	3	1	2	6
4	Hungary (HUN)	1	5	0	6
5	Great Britain (GBR)	0	0	1	1
5	Israel (ISR)	0	0	1	1
Totals (6 entries)		10	10	10	30

== Men's events ==
The results of the Championships:

Event	Gold		Silver		Bronze	
500 metres	Sjinkie Knegt (NED)	41.168	Dylan Hoogerwerf (NED)	41.549	Viktor Ahn (RUS)	41.834
1000 metres	Sándor Liu Shaolin (HUN)	1:25.964	Liu Shaoang (HUN)	1:26.061	Semion Elistratov (RUS)	1:41.207
1500 metres	Semion Elistratov (RUS)	2:20.608	Liu Shaoang (HUN)	2:20.808	Vladislav Bykanov (ISR)	2:20.822
5000 metre relay	Netherlands; Itzhak de Laat; Sjinkie Knegt; Daan Breeuwsma; Dylan Hoogerwerf	6:56.809	Russia; Semion Elistratov; Alexander Shulginov; Viktor Ahn; Denis Ayrapetyan; Ruslan Zakharov	6:56.889	Italy; Tommaso Dotti; Yuri Confortola; Andrea Cassinelli; Nicola Rodigari; Davide Viscardi	7:00.168
Overall Classification	Semion Elistratov (RUS)	86 pts.	Sándor Liu Shaolin (HUN)	71 pts.	Sjinkie Knegt (NED)	54 pts.

== Women's events ==
The results of the Championships:

Event	Gold		Silver		Bronze	
500 metres	Rianne de Vries (NED)	44.263	Martina Valcepina (ITA)	44.320	Charlotte Gilmartin (GBR)	44.548
1000 metres	Sofia Prosvirnova (RUS)	1:31.546	Andrea Keszler (HUN)	1:31.551	Ekaterina Konstantinova (RUS)	1:32.214
1500 metres	Arianna Fontana (ITA)	2:28.884	Sofia Prosvirnova (RUS)	2:29.134	Lucia Peretti (ITA)	2:29.231
3000 metre relay	Italy; Lucia Peretti; Cecilia Maffei; Arianna Fontana; Martina Valcepina; Arianna Valcepina	4:17.166	Hungary; Sára Luca Bácskai; Petra Jászapáti; Andrea Keszler; Zsófia Kónya	4:17.195	Netherlands; Suzanne Schulting; Yara van Kerkhof; Lara van Ruijven; Rianne de Vries	4:18.446
Overall Classification	Arianna Fontana (ITA)	79 pts.	Sofia Prosvirnova (RUS)	73 pts.	Ekaterina Konstantinova (RUS)	39 pts.

== Participating nations ==
- Austria
- Belarus
- Bosnia & Herzegovina
- Belgium
- Bulgaria
- Croatia
- Czech Republic
- Spain
- France
- Great Britain
- Germany
- Hungary
- Ireland
- Israel
- Italy
- Latvia
- Lithuania
- Netherlands
- Norway
- Poland
- Romania
- Russia
- Slovenia
- Serbia
- Slovak Republic
- Sweden
- Turkey
- Ukraine

== See also ==
- Short track speed skating
- European Short Track Speed Skating Championships
