= Davide Viscardi =

Italian short-track speed skater

Personal information
- Born: December 21, 1990 (age 35) Milan, Italy
- Height: 1.69 m (5 ft 7 in)
- Weight: 72 kg (159 lb)

Sport
- Country: Italy
- Sport: Short track speed skating
- Coached by: Kenan Gouadec, Eric Bedard

Davide Viscardi (born 21 December 1990 in Milan) is an Italian male short track speed skater. He was part of the Italian team that placed 8th in the 5,000 meter relay in Short Track Speed Skating during the 2014 Olympics in Sochi.
