= 2017 IBSF Junior Skeleton World Championships =

The 2017 IBSF Junior Skeleton World Championships took place at the Sigulda bobsleigh, luge, and skeleton track in Sigulda, Latvia, from 24 to 28 January 2017.

== Schedule ==
Two events were held.

All times are local (UTC+2).

Date	Time	Events
28 February	10:00	Men's Skeleton
28 February	10:00	Women's Skeleton

== Medal table ==
Rank	Nation	Gold	Silver	Bronze	Total
1	Russia (RUS)	2	1	1	4
2	Latvia (LAT)	0	1	0	1
3	Germany (GER)	0	0	1	1
Totals (3 entries)		2	2	2	6

=== Skeleton ===
Event	Gold		Silver		Bronze	
Men's	Nikita Tregubov; Russia	1:41.47	Krists Netlaus; Latvia	1:41.83 +0.36	Evgeniy Rukosuev; Russia	1:42.46 +0.99
Women's	Yulia Kanakina; Russia	1:45.66	Renata Khuzina; Russia	1:45.85 +0.19	Maxi Just; Germany	1:46.14 +0.48
