= Jamie Macdonald (speed skater) =

Canadian short-track speed skater

Personal information
- Born: December 22, 1994 (age 31) Kitimat, British Columbia, Canada
- Height: 1.50 m (4 ft 11 in)

Sport
- Country: Canada
- Sport: Short track speed skating
Medal record
World Championships
| Bronze medal – third place | 2018 Montreal | 3000 m relay |
Winter Universiade
| Bronze medal – third place | 2015 Granada | 3000 m relay |

Jamie Macdonald (born December 22, 1994) is a Canadian short track speed skater. and has been a member of the senior national team since 2015

== Career ==
=== 2013 ===
Macdonald competed at the 2013 Winter Universiade in Trentino, Italy.

=== 2015 ===
Macdonald competed at the 2015 Winter Universiade in Granada, Spain, where she won a bronze medal as part of the 3,000 metres relay.

=== 2016 ===
As part of the 2015–16 ISU Short Track Speed Skating World Cup, Macdonald won her first ever World Cup medal, a silver in the 1000 m event in Dordrecht, Netherlands. Macdonald followed this up with a silver in the 500 m event in Calgary, Alberta as part of the 2016–17 ISU Short Track Speed Skating World Cup.

=== 2017 ===
Macdonald won a bronze medal in the 500 m event as part of the Dresden World Cup. Macdonald was named to Canada's 2018 Olympic team in August 2017. This will mark her Olympic debut.
