= Ekaterina Konstantinova =

Russian speed skater

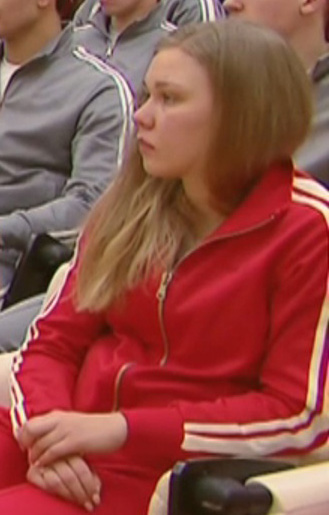

Personal information
- Nationality: Russian
- Born: 13 October 1995 (age 30) Saint Petersburg, Russia
- Height: 1.71 m (5 ft 7 in)
- Weight: 64 kg (141 lb)

Sport
- Country: Russia
- Sport: Short track speed skating
- Club: Central Sports Army Club
Medal record
Representing Russia
World Championships
Silver medal – second place	2019 Sofia	3000 m relay
European Championships
Gold medal – first place	2015 Dordrecht	3000 m relay
Gold medal – first place	2018 Dresden	3000 m relay
Silver medal – second place	2016 Sochi	3000 m relay
Silver medal – second place	2019 Dordrecht	3000 m relay
Bronze medal – third place	2017 Torino	Overall
Bronze medal – third place	2017 Torino	1000 m
Bronze medal – third place	2020 Debrecen	3000 m relay
Military World Games
Silver medal – second place	2017 Sochi	Mixed 3000 m

Ekaterina Igorevna Konstantinova (Russian: Екатерина Игоревна Константинова; born 13 October 1995) is a Russian short track speed skater. She competed in the 2018 Winter Olympics.
