= Kim Ye-jin =

South Korean short track speed skater

Personal information
- Nationality: South Korean
- Born: 20 December 1999 (age 26) Seoul, South Korea
- Height: 1.63 m (5 ft 4 in)
- Weight: 52 kg (115 lb)

Sport
- Country: South Korea
- Sport: Short track speed skating
Medal record
Olympic Games
Gold medal – first place	2018 Pyeongchang	3000 m relay
World Championships
Gold medal – first place	2018 Montreal	3000 m relay

- Kim Ye-jin
- Hangul: 김예진
- RR: Gim Yejin
- MR: Kim Yejin

Kim Ye-jin (Korean: 김예진; born 20 December 1999) is a South Korean short track speed skater. She competed in the 2018 Winter Olympics.

In 2020, she announced that she changed her name to Lia, Kim Lia.
