= Yara van Kerkhof =

Dutch speed skater (born 1990)

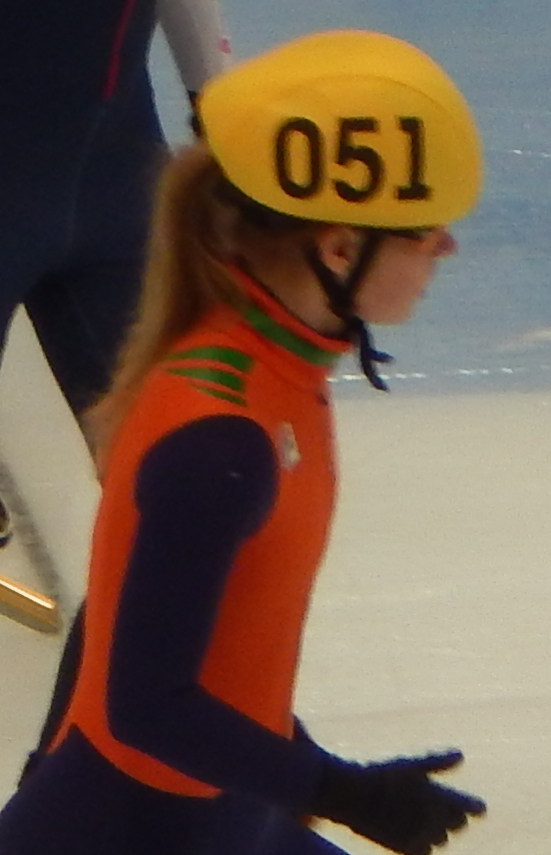
- Van Kerkhof in 2015

Personal information
- Full name: Yara Nina van Kerkhof
- Nickname: Pitbull
- Nationality: Dutch
- Born: 31 May 1990 (age 36) Zoetermeer, Netherlands
- Height: 1.63 m (5 ft 4 in)
- Weight: 52 kg (115 lb)

Sport
- Country: Netherlands
- Sport: Short track speed skating
- Club: IJsvereniging Zoetermeer

Achievements and titles
- Highest world ranking: 11 (1000 m)
Medal record
Women's short-track speed skating
Representing the Netherlands
Olympic Games
| Gold medal – first place | 2022 Beijing | 3000 m relay |
| Silver medal – second place | 2018 Pyeongchang | 500 m |
| Bronze medal – third place | 2018 Pyeongchang | 3000 m relay |
World Championships
| Gold medal – first place | 2021 Dordrecht | 3000 m relay |
| Gold medal – first place | 2023 Seoul | 3000 m relay |
| Gold medal – first place | 2024 Rotterdam | 3000 m relay |
| Silver medal – second place | 2011 Sheffield | 3000 m relay |
| Silver medal – second place | 2018 Montreal | 3000 m relay |
| Bronze medal – third place | 2022 Montreal | 500 m |
| Bronze medal – third place | 2022 Montreal | 3000 m relay |
European Championships
| Gold medal – first place | 2011 Heerenveen | 3000 m relay |
| Gold medal – first place | 2012 Mladá Boleslav | 3000 m relay |
| Gold medal – first place | 2013 Malmö | 3000 m relay |
| Gold medal – first place | 2014 Dresden | 3000 m relay |
| Gold medal – first place | 2016 Sochi | 3000 m relay |
| Gold medal – first place | 2019 Dordrecht | 3000 m relay |
| Gold medal – first place | 2020 Debrecen | 3000 m relay |
| Gold medal – first place | 2023 Gdańsk | 3000 m relay |
| Gold medal – first place | 2024 Gdańsk | 3000 m relay |
| Gold medal – first place | 2024 Gdańsk | 2000 m mixed relay |
| Silver medal – second place | 2015 Dordrecht | 3000 m relay |
| Silver medal – second place | 2018 Dresden | 1500 m |
| Bronze medal – third place | 2017 Turin | 3000 m relay |

Yara Nina van Kerkhof (Dutch pronunciation: [ˈjaːraː vɑŋ ˈkɛr(ə)kɦɔf]; born 31 May 1990) is a Dutch short track speed skater. She won the silver medal in the 500 m event at the 2018 Winter Olympics in Pyeongchang, South Korea.

== Career ==
Van Kerkhof competed at the 2014 Winter Olympics for the Netherlands. In the 500 metres she was second in her heat, advancing to a quarter-final, where she finished third, not advancing. In the 1500 metres she again advanced out of the first round, but was fifth in her semi-final, not advancing. She also competed in the 1000 metres, finishing third in her heat. As a member of the Dutch 3000 metre relay team, she was disqualified in the heats, again not advancing. Her best individual finish was in the 500m, where she was 11th.

As of September 2014, van Kerkhof's best performance at the World Championships came in 2011, when she won a silver medal as a member of the Dutch 3000m relay team. She also won gold medals as a member of the Dutch relay team at the 2012, 2013 and 2014 European Championships.

As of September 2014, van Kerkhof has one ISU Short Track Speed Skating World Cup victory, as part of the relay team in 2012–13 at Dresden. She also has two other podium finishes with the relay team. Her top World Cup ranking is 11th, in the 1000 metres in 2013–14.

She is a sister of Sanne van Kerkhof, also an Olympic short track speed skater.

== World Cup podiums ==
| Date | Season | Location | Rank | Event |
| 5 December 2010 | 2010–11 | Changchun | 3rd place, bronze medalist(s) | 3000m Relay |
| 5 February 2012 | 2011–12 | Moscow | 3rd place, bronze medalist(s) | 3000m Relay |
| 10 February 2013 | 2012–13 | Dresden | 1st place, gold medalist(s) | 3000m Relay |
