= Sára Bácskai =

Hungarian short track speed skater

Personal information
- Full name: Sára Luca Bácskai
- Born: 20 June 1999 (age 27) Budapest, Hungary
- Height: 1.65 m (5 ft 5 in)
- Weight: 57 kg (126 lb)

Sport
- Country: Hungary
- Sport: Short track speed skating
Medal record
Women's short-track speed skating
Representing Hungary
World Championships
Silver medal – second place	2017 Rotterdam	3000 m relay
European Championships
Silver medal – second place	2017 Turin	3000 m relay
Silver medal – second place	2018 Dresden	3000 m relay
Silver medal – second place	2023 Gdańsk	3000 m relay
Silver medal – second place	2025 Dresden	3000 m relay
Bronze medal – third place	2015 Dordrecht	3000 m relay
Bronze medal – third place	2018 Dresden	1500 m
Bronze medal – third place	2019 Dordrecht	3000 m relay
Bronze medal – third place	2026 Tilburg	3000 m relay

Sára Luca Bácskai (born 20 June 1999) is a Hungarian short track speed skater. She competed in the 2018 Winter Olympics.
