= Andrea Keszler =

Hungarian speed skater

Personal information
- Full name: Andrea Kollár-Keszler
- Born: 28 July 1989 (age 36) Tatabánya, Hungary
- Height: 5 ft 9 in (175 cm)
- Weight: 137 lb (62 kg)

Sport
- Country: Hungary
- Sport: Short track speed skating

Achievements and titles
- Highest world ranking: 20 (1000m)
Medal record
World Championships
| Silver medal – second place | 2017 Rotterdam | 3000 m relay |
Winter Universiade
| Bronze medal – third place | 2011 Erzurum | 3000 m relay |
| Bronze medal – third place | 2013 Trentino | 3000 m relay |
European Championships
| Gold medal – first place | 2009 Turin | 3000 m relay |
| Silver medal – second place | 2011 Heerenveen | 3000 m relay |
| Silver medal – second place | 2017 Turin | 3000 m relay |
| Silver medal – second place | 2018 Dresden | 3000 m relay |
| Bronze medal – third place | 2012 Mlada Boleslav | 500 m |
| Bronze medal – third place | 2012 Mlada Boleslav | 3000 m relay |
| Bronze medal – third place | 2014 Dresden | 3000 m relay |

Andrea Keszler (born 28 July 1989) is a Hungarian short-track speed-skater.

Keszler competed at the 2010 Winter Olympics for Hungary. She was a member of the Hungarian 3000 metre relay team, which finished fourth in the semifinals and second in the B Final, ending up fifth overall. She also competed at the 2014 Winter Olympics and the 2018 Winter Olympics.

As of 2013, Keszler's best finish at the World Championships, is 6th, in 2009 as part of the Hungarian 3000 metre relay team. Her best individual performance at a World Championships came in 2013, when she placed 22nd in the 1000 metres. She has also won a gold medal as a member of the Hungarian relay team at the 2009 European Championships.

As of 2013, Keszler has not finished on the podium on the ISU Short Track Speed Skating World Cup. Her top World Cup ranking is 20th, in the 1000 metres in 2012–13.
