= Semion Elistratov =

Russian speed skater (born 1990)

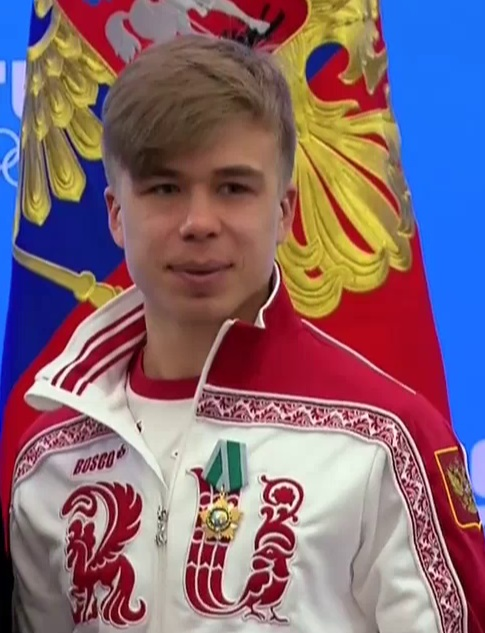
- Elistratov after the 2014 Winter Olympics

Personal information
- Native name: Семён Андреевич Елистратов
- Full name: Semion Andreyevich Elistratov
- Born: 3 May 1990 (age 36) Ufa, Bashkir ASSR, RSFSR, USSR (now Russia)
- Height: 1.75 m (5 ft 9 in)
- Weight: 70 kg (154 lb)

Sport
- Country: Russia
- Sport: Short track speed skating
- Club: MGFSO
- World Cup wins: 14

Achievements and titles
- World finals: 2
- Highest world ranking: 2 (Overall, 2014–15); 11 (500 m, 2010–11); 1 (1000 m, 2014–15); 3 (1500 m, 2015–16)
Medal record
Men's short track speed skating
Event	1st	2nd	3rd
Olympic Games	1	0	2
World Championships	1	2	6
European Championships	14	10	14
Total	16	12	22
Representing Russia
Olympic Games
Gold medal – first place	2014 Sochi	5000 m relay
World Championships
Gold medal – first place	2015 Moscow	1500 m
Silver medal – second place	2013 Debrecen	5000 m relay
Bronze medal – third place	2018 Montreal	500 m
Bronze medal – third place	2018 Montreal	1500 m
Bronze medal – third place	2019 Sofia	1000 m
Bronze medal – third place	2019 Sofia	Overall
European Championships
Gold medal – first place	2013 Malmö	5000 m relay
Gold medal – first place	2014 Dresden	1500 m
Gold medal – first place	2014 Dresden	5000 m relay
Gold medal – first place	2015 Dordrecht	5000 m relay
Gold medal – first place	2016 Sochi	1000 m
Gold medal – first place	2016 Sochi	1500 m
Gold medal – first place	2016 Sochi	Overall
Gold medal – first place	2017 Turin	1500 m
Gold medal – first place	2017 Turin	Overall
Gold medal – first place	2019 Dordrecht	1000 m
Gold medal – first place	2020 Debrecen	5000 m relay
Gold medal – first place	2021 Gdańsk	Overall
Gold medal – first place	2021 Gdańsk	1000 m
Gold medal – first place	2021 Gdańsk	1500 m
Silver medal – second place	2012 Mladá Boleslav	1500 m
Silver medal – second place	2012 Mladá Boleslav	5000 m relay
Silver medal – second place	2014 Dresden	Overall
Silver medal – second place	2014 Dresden	1000 m
Silver medal – second place	2015 Dordrecht	1500 m
Silver medal – second place	2016 Sochi	500 m
Silver medal – second place	2017 Turin	5000 m relay
Silver medal – second place	2018 Dresden	1000 m
Silver medal – second place	2018 Dresden	1500 m
Silver medal – second place	2018 Dresden	5000 m relay
Bronze medal – third place	2012 Mladá Boleslav	Overall
Bronze medal – third place	2013 Malmö	1000 m
Bronze medal – third place	2015 Dordrecht	500 m
Bronze medal – third place	2015 Dordrecht	1000 m
Bronze medal – third place	2015 Dordrecht	Overall
Bronze medal – third place	2017 Turin	1000 m
Bronze medal – third place	2018 Dresden	Overall
Bronze medal – third place	2019 Dordrecht	1500 m
Bronze medal – third place	2019 Dordrecht	Overall
Bronze medal – third place	2019 Dordrecht	5000 m relay
Bronze medal – third place	2020 Debrecen	Overall
Bronze medal – third place	2020 Debrecen	500 m
Bronze medal – third place	2020 Debrecen	1000 m
Bronze medal – third place	2021 Gdańsk	5000 m relay
Representing Olympic Athletes from Russia
Olympic Games
Bronze medal – third place	2018 Pyeongchang	1500 m
Representing ROC
Olympic Games
Bronze medal – third place	2022 Beijing	1500 m
Representing Russian Skating Union
World Championships
Silver medal – second place	2021 Dordrecht	500 m
Bronze medal – third place	2021 Dordrecht	1500 m
Bronze medal – third place	2021 Dordrecht	Overall

Semion Andreyevich Elistratov (Russian: Семён Андреевич Елистратов; alternatively spelled Semen or Semyon, born 3 May 1990) is a Russian short track speed skater. He is the 2014 Olympic champion in the 5000 m relay and a double bronze medalist in the 1500 m at the 2018 and 2022 Winter Olympics.

== Career ==
Elistratov competed at the 2010 Winter Olympics for Russia. In the 500 metres and 1000 metres, he placed third in his round one heat, failing to advance, and in the 1500 metres, he placed fourth, also failing to advance. In all three events, he ended up 24th overall.

As of 2013, Elistratov's best performance at the World Championships came in 2015, when he won a gold medal in 1500 m individual race. Elistratov won gold medals as a member of the Russian relay team at the 2013 and 2014 European Championships, and was runner-up in the overall competition at the 2014 European Championships as well.

As of 2013, Elistratov has two ISU Short Track Speed Skating World Cup victories as part of the relay team in 2012–13 at Sochi, and in the 500 metres at Changchun in 2010–11. He also has nine other podium finishes at World Cup events, three as an individual and six in relay races. His top World Cup ranking was 4th in the 1500 metres in 2012–13.

On 8 March 2016, it was known Elistratov failed a drug test for meldonium and was withdrawn from the entry list for Russia's Team to compete at the 2016 World Short Track Speed Skating Championships in Seoul, South Korea. He was temporarily suspended from the Russian team. On 13 April, the World Anti-Doping Agency gave amnesty to athletes with the presence of less than one microgram of meldonium in doping samples in tests conducted on athletes before 1 March 2016 is acceptable, WADA cites due to uncertainties and lack of studies for how long meldonium stays in the body. On 21 April 2016, the International Skating Union lifted its temporary ban on Elistratov, and he was reinstated in the team since the concentration of meldonium was below the threshold.

The International Skating Union's Official Statement was quoted: "In the case of Meldonium, the WADA recognized that there is currently a lack of clear scientific information on excretion time and considers that in certain circumstances there may be grounds for no fault or negligence on the part of the athlete. All mentioned skaters credibly assured the ISU that they had discontinued the use of Meldonium before 1 January 2016, when the substance was included in the prohibited list. In light of the given information, the ISU has decided to lift the provisional suspension imposed on the four skaters, with immediate effect, to stay the results management process and consequently not to disqualify any results at the present stage."

== World cup podiums ==
- 14 victories – (1 × 500 m, 4 × 1000 m, 3 × 1500, 4 × 5000 m relay, 2 × 2000 m mixed relay)
- 40 podiums – (3 × 500 m, 14 × 1000 m, 11 × 1500, 10 × 5000 m relay, 2 × 2000 m mixed relay)

No.	Season	Date	Location	Discipline	Place
1	2010–11	5 December 2010	Changchun, China	500 m	1st place, gold medalist(s)
2	2011–12	30 October 2011	Saguenay, Canada	5000 m relay	2nd place, silver medalist(s)
3	2011–12	4 December 2011	Nagoya, Japan	5000 m relay	2nd place, silver medalist(s)
4	2011–12	11 February 2012	Dordrecht, the Netherlands	1500 m	3rd place, bronze medalist(s)
5	2012–13	21 October 2012	Calgary, Canada	5000 m relay	2nd place, silver medalist(s)
6	2012–13	27 October 2012	Montreal, Canada	1500 m	3rd place, bronze medalist(s)
7	2012–13	3 February 2013	Sochi, Russia	5000 m relay	1st place, gold medalist(s)
8	2012–13	3 February 2013	Sochi, Russia	1000 m	2nd place, silver medalist(s)
9	2012–13	10 February 2013	Dresden, Germany	5000 m relay	3rd place, bronze medalist(s)
10	2013–14	10 November 2013	Turin, Italy	5000 m relay	2nd place, silver medalist(s)
11	2013–14	17 November 2013	Kolomna, Russia	5000 m relay	2nd place, silver medalist(s)
12	2014–15	9 November 2014	Salt Lake City, United States	1000 m	2nd place, silver medalist(s)
13	2014–15	9 November 2014	Salt Lake City, United States	5000 m relay	1st place, gold medalist(s)
14	2014–15	16 November 2014	Montreal, Canada	1000 m	2nd place, silver medalist(s)
15	2014–15	7 February 2015	Dresden, Germany	1000 m	1st place, gold medalist(s)
16	2014–15	8 February 2015	Dresden, Germany	1500 m	1st place, gold medalist(s)
17	2014–15	14 February 2015	Erzurum, Turkey	1000 m	1st place, gold medalist(s)
18	2015–16	1 November 2015	Montreal, Canada	1000 m	3rd place, bronze medalist(s)
19	2015–16	5 December 2015	Nagoya, Japan	1000 m	1st place, gold medalist(s)
20	2015–16	5 December 2015	Nagoya, Japan	1500 m	2nd place, silver medalist(s)
21	2015–16	12 December 2015	Shanghai, China	1000 m	3rd place, bronze medalist(s)
22	2015–16	7 February 2016	Dresden, Germany	500 m	2nd place, silver medalist(s)
23	2015–16	7 February 2016	Dresden, Germany	1000 m	2nd place, silver medalist(s)
24	2015–16	14 February 2016	Dordrecht, the Netherlands	1000 m	3rd place, bronze medalist(s)
25	2016–17	5 November 2016	Calgary, Canada	1500 m	3rd place, bronze medalist(s)
26	2016–17	6 November 2016	Calgary, Canada	500 m	2nd place, silver medalist(s)
27	2016–17	13 November 2016	Salt Lake City, United States	1500 m	3rd place, bronze medalist(s)
28	2016–17	13 December 2016	Shanghai, China	1500 m	2nd place, silver medalist(s)
29	2016–17	17 December 2016	Gangneung, South Korea	1500 m	3rd place, bronze medalist(s)
30	2016–17	18 December 2016	Gangneung, South Korea	1000 m	2nd place, silver medalist(s)
31	2016–17	5 February 2017	Dresden, Germany	5000 m relay	1st place, gold medalist(s)
32	2018–19	3 February 2019	Dresden, Germany	2000 m mixed relay	1st place, gold medalist(s)
33	2018–19	10 February 2019	Turin, Italy	2000 m mixed relay	1st place, gold medalist(s)
34	2018–19	10 February 2019	Turin, Italy	5000 m relay	1st place, gold medalist(s)
35	2019–20	2 November 2019	Salt Lake City, United States	1500 m	1st place, gold medalist(s)
36	2019–20	10 November 2019	Montreal, Canada	1000 m	1st place, gold medalist(s)
37	2019–20	30 November 2019	Nagoya, Japan	1000 m	3rd place, bronze medalist(s)
38	2019–20	9 February 2019	Dresden, Germany	1500 m	2nd place, silver medalist(s)
39	2021–22	23 October 2021	Beijing, China	1500 m	1st place, gold medalist(s)
40	2021–22	24 October 2021	Beijing, China	1000 m	2nd place, silver medalist(s)
