= Daan Breeuwsma =

Dutch short-track speed skater

Personal information
- Born: 29 December 1987 (age 38) Heerenveen, Netherlands
- Height: 1.81 m (5 ft 11 in)
- Weight: 71 kg (157 lb)

Sport
- Country: Netherlands
- Sport: Short track speed skating
- Coached by: Jeroen Otter
Medal record
World Championships
| Gold medal – first place | 2014 Montreal | 5000 m relay |
| Gold medal – first place | 2017 Rotterdam | 5000 m relay |
| Gold medal – first place | 2021 Dordrecht | 5000 m relay |
| Silver medal – second place | 2012 Shanghai | 5000 m relay |
| Bronze medal – third place | 2013 Debrecen | 5000 m relay |
| Bronze medal – third place | 2015 Moscow | 5000 m relay |
European Championships
| Gold medal – first place | 2011 Heerenveen | 5000 m relay |
| Gold medal – first place | 2012 Mladá Boleslav | 5000 m relay |
| Gold medal – first place | 2016 Sochi | 5000 m relay |
| Gold medal – first place | 2017 Turin | 5000 m relay |
| Gold medal – first place | 2018 Dresden | 5000 m relay |
| Silver medal – second place | 2009 Turin | 5000 m relay |
| Silver medal – second place | 2013 Malmö | 5000 m relay |
| Silver medal – second place | 2014 Dresden | 5000 m relay |
| Silver medal – second place | 2019 Dordrecht | 5000 m relay |
| Silver medal – second place | 2020 Debrecen | 5000 m relay |
| Bronze medal – third place | 2015 Dordrecht | 1500 m |
| Bronze medal – third place | 2015 Dordrecht | 5000 m relay |

Daan Breeuwsma (born 29 December 1987) is a Dutch male short-track speed-skater.

His partner is short track speed skater Rianne de Vries, who was also part of the national team at the 2014 Winter Olympics.
