= Sanne van Kerkhof =

Dutch short track speed skater

Personal information
- Born: 27 March 1987 (age 39) Voorburg, Netherlands

Sport
- Sport: Short track speed skating
- Retired: 2015

Sanne van Kerkhof (born 27 March 1987) is a Dutch former short track speed skater.

She participated in the 2010 Winter Olympics and the 2014 Winter Olympics. She was part of the 3000 m relay team which was fourth in 2010; in 2014, the team was disqualified in the semifinal and did not advance to the finals.

In 2015, van Kerkhof retired from competitions. In 2014, she started working with the recruitment company Randstad NV.

She is a sister of Yara van Kerkhof, also an Olympic short track speed skater and a 2018 Olympics silver medalist.
