= Lara van Ruijven =

Dutch short track speed skater (1992–2020)

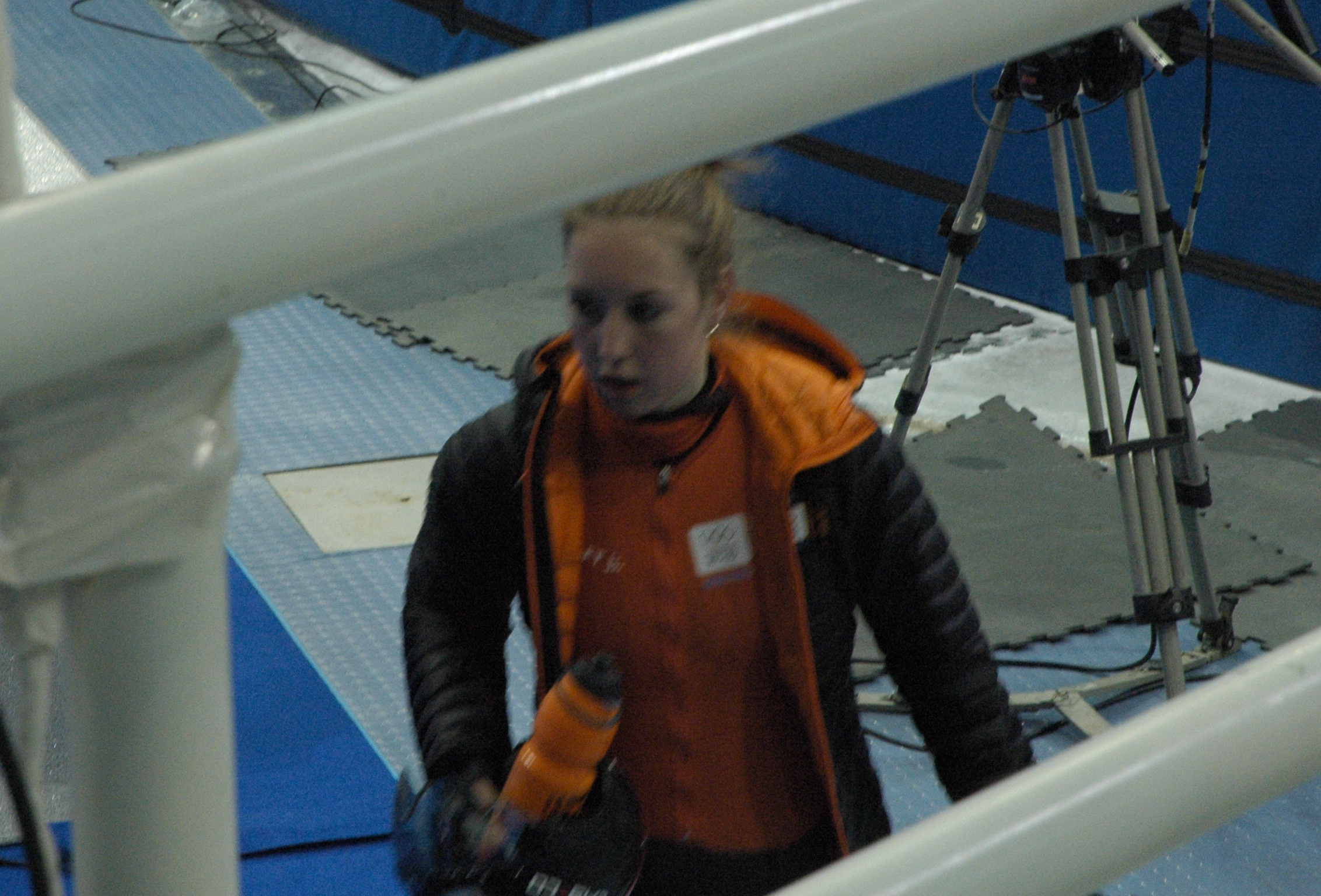
- Van Ruijven at the 2014 Winter Olympics

Personal information
- Full name: Lara Victoria van Ruijven
- Nationality: Dutch
- Born: 28 December 1992 Naaldwijk, Netherlands
- Died: 10 July 2020 (aged 27) Perpignan, France
- Height: 1.68 m (5 ft 6 in)
- Weight: 58 kg (128 lb)

Sport
- Country: Netherlands
- Sport: Short track speed skating
- Event: 500 m
- Club: HVHW
- World Cup wins: 10

Achievements and titles
- Highest world ranking: 24 (500m)
- Personal bests: 500 m: 42.453 (2019); 1000 m: 1:28.006 (2018); 1500 m: 2:23.588 (2018); 3000 m: 5:14.025 (2015)
Medal record
Event	1st	2nd	3rd
Olympic Games	0	0	1
World Championships	1	1	0
European Championships	5	2	2
Olympic Games
Bronze medal – third place	2018 Pyeongchang	3000 m relay
World Championships
Gold medal – first place	2019 Sofia	500 m
Silver medal – second place	2018 Montreal	3000 m relay
European Championships
Gold medal – first place	2013 Malmö	3000 m relay
Gold medal – first place	2014 Dresden	3000 m relay
Gold medal – first place	2016 Sochi	3000 m relay
Gold medal – first place	2019 Dordrecht	3000 m relay
Gold medal – first place	2020 Debrecen	3000 m relay
Silver medal – second place	2015 Dordrecht	3000 m relay
Silver medal – second place	2020 Debrecen	1000 m
Bronze medal – third place	2017 Turin	3000 m relay
Bronze medal – third place	2019 Dordrecht	500 m

Lara Victoria van Ruijven (Dutch pronunciation: [ˈlaːraː vɑn ˈrœyvə(n)]; 28 December 1992 – 10 July 2020) was a Dutch short track speed skater. At the 2018 Winter Olympics, she was part of the Dutch 3000 metres relay team that won a bronze medal. She won gold at the World Championships one year later. By doing so, she became the first Dutch woman to win a world short track title at an individual event.

== Early life ==
Lara Victoria van Ruijven was born in Naaldwijk (near The Hague) on 28 December 1992. She began racing short track when she was six, and her childhood idol was Evgenia Radanova. She studied law at the Open University of the Netherlands and resided in Heerenveen. In addition to her native Dutch, she also spoke English and French.

== Career ==
Van Ruijven first competed as a member of the Dutch Olympic team at the 2014 Winter Olympics. In the 500 metres she was third in her heat, failing to advance, and placing 17th overall. As a member of the Dutch 3000 metre relay team, she was disqualified in the heats, again not advancing. Throughout that year, she had problems with her knee that compelled her to change her training routine. Three years later, in September 2017, she dislocated her shoulder.

She breakthrough year came in 2018, when she earned her first Olympic medal at that year's Winter Games, as part of the Dutch team that finished third in the 3000 metre relay. Several weeks later, she secured her first medal at the World Championships, when her team finished runner-up in the 3000 metre relay.

At the 2019 World Championships, Van Ruijven won a gold medal in the 500 metres (1,600 ft) event and was in the lead for almost the entirety of the race. However, the Dutch team were unable to improve on their result in the 3000 metre relay from the previous year and dropped to fourth place. By securing gold, she became the first Dutch woman to win a world short track title at an individual event. Van Ruijven finished fourth overall in terms of total points won at the championships.

== Illness and death ==
Van Ruijven was hospitalized on 25 June 2020, after falling ill during a stay at a training camp near Font-Romeu-Odeillo-Via. Four days later, she was transferred to an intensive care unit due to an autoimmune disease. She was subsequently placed in a coma and underwent multiple surgeries, but her condition did not improve. She died on 10 July 2020 at a hospital in Perpignan, France; she was 27 years old.

== Achievements ==
=== World Cup victories ===
Date	Season	Location	Rank	Event
10 February 2013	2012–13	Dresden	1st place, gold medalist(s)	3000 m relay
5 February 2017	2016–17	Dresden	1st place, gold medalist(s)	3000 m relay
19 November 2017	2017–18	Seoul	1st place, gold medalist(s)	3000 m relay
4 November 2018	2018–19	Calgary	1st place, gold medalist(s)	500m
9 December 2018	2018–19	Almaty	1st place, gold medalist(s)	3000 m relay
10 February 2019	2018–19	Turin	1st place, gold medalist(s)	3000 m relay
7 December 2019	2019–20	Shanghai	1st place, gold medalist(s)	2000m relay
9 February 2020	2019–20	Dresden	1st place, gold medalist(s)	3000 m relay
15 February 2020	2019–20	Dordrecht	1st place, gold medalist(s)	500m
16 February 2020	2019–20	Dordrecht	1st place, gold medalist(s)	3000 m relay
