= Short-track speed skating at the 2017 Asian Winter Games – Men's 1500 metres =

Men's 1500 metres at the 2017 Asian Winter Games
- Venue: Makomanai Ice Arena
- Dates: 20 February 2017
- Competitors: 39 from 15 nations

Medalists
| gold medal | Park Se-yeong | South Korea |
| silver medal | Wu Dajing | China |
| bronze medal | Lee Jung-su | South Korea |

The men's 1500 metres at the 2017 Asian Winter Games was held on February 20, 2017, in Sapporo, Japan.

== Schedule ==
All times are Japan Standard Time (UTC+09:00)

| Date | Time | Event |
|---|---|---|
| Monday, 20 February 2017 | 13:39 | Heats |
| Monday, 20 February 2017 | 14:43 | Semifinals |
| Monday, 20 February 2017 | 15:27 | Finals |

== Results ==
Legend

- ADV — Advanced
- PEN — Penalty

=== Heats ===
- Qualification: 1–3 → Semifinals (Q)

==== Heat 1 ====
| Rank | Athlete | Time | Notes |
|---|---|---|---|
| 1 | Keita Watanabe (JPN) | 2:34.056 | Q |
| 2 | Nurtilek Kazhgali (KAZ) | 2:34.179 | Q |
| 3 | Chris Jarden (NZL) | 2:37.238 | Q |
| 4 | Kelvin Tsang (HKG) | 2:39.924 | |
| 5 | Oky Andrianto (INA) | 2:48.962 | |

==== Heat 2 ====
| Rank | Athlete | Time | Notes |
|---|---|---|---|
| 1 | Lee Jung-su (KOR) | 2:44.094 | Q |
| 2 | Choe Un-song (PRK) | 2:45.227 | Q |
| 3 | Tsai Chia-wei (TPE) | 2:46.725 | Q |
| 4 | Lucas Ng (SGP) | 2:47.061 | |
| 5 | Vincent Chan (MAS) | 2:59.788 | |

==== Heat 3 ====
| Rank | Athlete | Time | Notes |
|---|---|---|---|
| 1 | Hiroki Yokoyama (JPN) | 2:47.202 | Q |
| 2 | Alex Bryant (AUS) | 2:47.403 | Q |
| 3 | Sidney Chu (HKG) | 3:05.485 | Q |
| 4 | Ben Whiteside (NZL) | 5:18.198 | |
| — | Teerasak Boonpok (THA) | PEN | |

==== Heat 4 ====
| Rank | Athlete | Time | Notes |
|---|---|---|---|
| 1 | Park Se-yeong (KOR) | 2:42.158 | Q |
| 2 | Han Tianyu (CHN) | 2:42.246 | Q |
| 3 | Kuandyk Suleimenov (KAZ) | 2:42.364 | Q |
| 4 | Lin Xian-you (TPE) | 2:43.214 | |
| 5 | Ashwin D'Silva (IND) | 2:49.967 | |
| 6 | Mubarak Al-Mohannadi (QAT) | No time | |

==== Heat 5 ====
| Rank | Athlete | Time | Notes |
|---|---|---|---|
| 1 | Seo Yi-ra (KOR) | 2:30.868 | Q |
| 2 | Pierre Boda (AUS) | 2:30.891 | Q |
| 3 | Su Jun-peng (TPE) | 2:31.202 | Q |
| 4 | Hazim Syahmi Shahrum (MAS) | 2:34.392 | |
| 5 | Johanes Wihardja (INA) | No time | |
| 6 | Jumah Al-Sulaiti (QAT) | No time | |

==== Heat 6 ====
| Rank | Athlete | Time | Notes |
|---|---|---|---|
| 1 | Ren Ziwei (CHN) | 2:31.155 | Q |
| 2 | Yerkebulan Shamukhanov (KAZ) | 2:31.253 | Q |
| 3 | Sohan Sudhir Tarkar (IND) | 2:36.272 | Q |
| 4 | Khairil Ridhwan Khalil (MAS) | 2:40.871 | |
| 5 | Prakit Bovornmongkolsak (THA) | 2:44.237 | |
| 6 | Mohammed Al-Sahouti (QAT) | No time | |

==== Heat 7 ====
| Rank | Athlete | Time | Notes |
|---|---|---|---|
| 1 | Wu Dajing (CHN) | 2:36.403 | Q |
| 2 | Kazuki Yoshinaga (JPN) | 2:36.527 | Q |
| 3 | Keanu Blunden (AUS) | 2:36.530 | Q |
| 4 | Allan Chandra Moedjiono (INA) | 2:55.645 | |
| 5 | Omkara Yogaraj (IND) | 3:11.470 | |
| — | Atip Navarat (THA) | PEN | |

=== Semifinals ===
- Qualification: 1–2 → Final A (QA), 3–4 → Final B (QB)

==== Heat 1 ====
| Rank | Athlete | Time | Notes |
|---|---|---|---|
| 1 | Lee Jung-su (KOR) | 2:19.871 | QA |
| 2 | Han Tianyu (CHN) | 2:20.059 | QA |
| 3 | Hiroki Yokoyama (JPN) | 2:21.105 | QB |
| 4 | Kuandyk Suleimenov (KAZ) | 2:21.825 | QB |
| 5 | Choe Un-song (PRK) | 2:22.423 | |
| 6 | Chris Jarden (NZL) | 2:29.791 | |
| 7 | Seo Yi-ra (KOR) | 2:43.085 | |

==== Heat 2 ====
| Rank | Athlete | Time | Notes |
|---|---|---|---|
| 1 | Park Se-yeong (KOR) | 2:21.830 | QA |
| 2 | Ren Ziwei (CHN) | 2:21.901 | QA |
| 3 | Pierre Boda (AUS) | 2:24.500 | QB |
| 4 | Tsai Chia-wei (TPE) | 2:29.519 | QB |
| 5 | Kazuki Yoshinaga (JPN) | 2:48.665 | ADVB |
| 6 | Alex Bryant (AUS) | 2:49.851 | ADVB |
| — | Keanu Blunden (AUS) | PEN | |

==== Heat 3 ====
| Rank | Athlete | Time | Notes |
|---|---|---|---|
| 1 | Wu Dajing (CHN) | 2:24.460 | QA |
| 2 | Yerkebulan Shamukhanov (KAZ) | 2:24.507 | QA |
| 3 | Keita Watanabe (JPN) | 2:24.730 | QB |
| 4 | Nurtilek Kazhgali (KAZ) | 2:25.195 | QB |
| 5 | Su Jun-peng (TPE) | 2:30.481 | |
| 6 | Sidney Chu (HKG) | 2:38.007 | |
| 7 | Sohan Sudhir Tarkar (IND) | No time | |

=== Finals ===
==== Final B ====
| Rank | Athlete | Time |
|---|---|---|
| 1 | Keita Watanabe (JPN) | 2:23.837 |
| 2 | Kazuki Yoshinaga (JPN) | 2:24.127 |
| 3 | Nurtilek Kazhgali (KAZ) | 2:24.233 |
| 4 | Kuandyk Suleimenov (KAZ) | 2:24.290 |
| 5 | Pierre Boda (AUS) | 2:25.339 |
| 6 | Alex Bryant (AUS) | 2:28.679 |
| 7 | Tsai Chia-wei (TPE) | 2:33.206 |
| 8 | Hiroki Yokoyama (JPN) | No time |

==== Final A ====
| Rank | Athlete | Time |
|---|---|---|
| 1st place, gold medalist(s) | Park Se-yeong (KOR) | 2:34.056 |
| 2nd place, silver medalist(s) | Wu Dajing (CHN) | 2:34.265 |
| 3rd place, bronze medalist(s) | Lee Jung-su (KOR) | 2:34.356 |
| 4 | Ren Ziwei (CHN) | 2:34.389 |
| 5 | Yerkebulan Shamukhanov (KAZ) | 2:34.499 |
| — | Han Tianyu (CHN) | PEN |
