= Short-track speed skating at the 2017 Asian Winter Games – Men's 1000 metres =

Men's 1000 metres at the 2017 Asian Winter Games
- Venue: Makomanai Ice Arena
- Dates: 22 February 2017
- Competitors: 39 from 15 nations

Medalists
gold medal	Seo Yi-ra	South Korea
silver medal	Sin Da-woon	South Korea
bronze medal	Keita Watanabe	Japan

The men's 1000 metres at the 2017 Asian Winter Games was held on February 22, 2017 in Sapporo, Japan.

== Schedule ==
All times are Japan Standard Time (UTC+09:00)

Date	Time	Event
Wednesday, 22 February 2017	12:42	Heats
Wednesday, 22 February 2017	13:41	Quarterfinals
Wednesday, 22 February 2017	14:20	Semifinals
Wednesday, 22 February 2017	14:53	Finals

== Results ==
Legend

- ADV — Advanced
- PEN — Penalty

=== Heats ===
- Qualification: 1–2 + Four best 3 → Quarterfinals (Q + q)

==== Heat 1 ====
Rank	Athlete	Time	Notes
1	Lee Jung-su (KOR)	1:29.747	Q
2	Alex Bryant (AUS)	1:30.554	Q
3	Kelvin Tsang (HKG)	1:33.122	q
4	Allan Chandra Moedjiono (INA)	1:48.441	
5	Jumah Al-Sulaiti (QAT)	2:11.590	

==== Heat 2 ====
Rank	Athlete	Time	Notes
1	Seo Yi-ra (KOR)	1:31.159	Q
2	Han Tianyu (CHN)	1:31.189	Q
3	Ben Whiteside (NZL)	1:34.838	
4	Steavanus Wihardja (INA)	1:39.367	
5	Atip Navarat (THA)	1:39.473	

==== Heat 3 ====
Rank	Athlete	Time	Notes
1	Hiroki Yokoyama (JPN)	1:37.281	Q
2	Pierre Boda (AUS)	1:37.585	Q
3	Wong De Vin (MAS)	1:39.925	
4	Akash Aradhya (IND)	1:40.375	
5	Mubarak Al-Mohannadi (QAT)	2:10.332	

==== Heat 4 ====
Rank	Athlete	Time	Notes
1	Keita Watanabe (JPN)	1:35.527	Q
2	Mersaid Zhaxybayev (KAZ)	1:35.835	Q
3	Mohammed Al-Sahouti (QAT)	2:11.778	ADV
—	Lin Xian-you (TPE)	PEN	

==== Heat 5 ====
Rank	Athlete	Time	Notes
1	Wu Dajing (CHN)	1:32.338	Q
2	Adil Galiakhmetov (KAZ)	1:32.495	Q
3	Su Jun-peng (TPE)	1:33.857	q
4	Lucas Ng (SGP)	1:34.332	
5	Hazim Syahmi Shahrum (MAS)	1:40.704	

==== Heat 6 ====
Rank	Athlete	Time	Notes
1	Sin Da-woon (KOR)	1:31.615	Q
2	Yerkebulan Shamukhanov (KAZ)	1:31.790	Q
3	Lin Chun-chieh (TPE)	1:36.291	
4	Teerasak Boonpok (THA)	1:39.694	
5	G. V. Raghavendra (IND)	1:43.239	

==== Heat 7 ====
Rank	Athlete	Time	Notes
1	Kazuki Yoshinaga (JPN)	1:28.686	Q
2	Choe Un-song (PRK)	1:29.508	Q
3	Sidney Chu (HKG)	1:33.592	q
4	Ashwin D'Silva (IND)	1:39.562	
5	Prakit Bovornmongkolsak (THA)	1:44.725	

==== Heat 8 ====
Rank	Athlete	Time	Notes
1	Andy Jung (AUS)	1:31.828	Q
2	Xu Hongzhi (CHN)	1:32.122	Q
3	Chris Jarden (NZL)	1:33.266	q
4	Oky Andrianto (INA)	1:39.051	
5	Khairil Ridhwan Khalil (MAS)	1:44.021	

=== Quarterfinals ===
- Qualification: 1–2 + Two best 3 → Semifinals (Q + q)

==== Heat 1 ====
Rank	Athlete	Time	Notes
1	Kazuki Yoshinaga (JPN)	1:28.307	Q
2	Hiroki Yokoyama (JPN)	1:28.455	Q
3	Choe Un-song (PRK)	1:28.561	
4	Pierre Boda (AUS)	1:29.572	
5	Kelvin Tsang (HKG)	1:33.467	

==== Heat 2 ====
Rank	Athlete	Time	Notes
1	Lee Jung-su (KOR)	1:27.199	Q
2	Keita Watanabe (JPN)	1:27.289	Q
3	Mersaid Zhaxybayev (KAZ)	1:28.145	q
4	Alex Bryant (AUS)	1:28.609	
5	Chris Jarden (NZL)	1:29.333	

==== Heat 3 ====
Rank	Athlete	Time	Notes
1	Han Tianyu (CHN)	1:25.899	Q
2	Seo Yi-ra (KOR)	1:25.984	Q
3	Adil Galiakhmetov (KAZ)	1:26.111	q
4	Sidney Chu (HKG)	1:32.711	
—	Wu Dajing (CHN)	PEN	

==== Heat 4 ====
Rank	Athlete	Time	Notes
1	Sin Da-woon (KOR)	1:27.774	Q
2	Xu Hongzhi (CHN)	1:28.945	Q
3	Andy Jung (AUS)	1:28.968	
4	Su Jun-peng (TPE)	1:31.049	
5	Mohammed Al-Sahouti (QAT)	2:23.497	
—	Yerkebulan Shamukhanov (KAZ)	PEN	

=== Semifinals ===
- Qualification: 1–2 → Final A (QA), 3–4 → Final B (QB)

==== Heat 1 ====
Rank	Athlete	Time	Notes
1	Seo Yi-ra (KOR)	1:24.641	QA
2	Lee Jung-su (KOR)	1:25.080	QA
3	Han Tianyu (CHN)	1:25.150	QB
4	Adil Galiakhmetov (KAZ)	1:25.880	QB
5	Xu Hongzhi (CHN)	1:32.092	

==== Heat 2 ====
Rank	Athlete	Time	Notes
1	Sin Da-woon (KOR)	1:26.853	QA
2	Keita Watanabe (JPN)	1:27.001	QA
3	Hiroki Yokoyama (JPN)	1:27.149	QB
4	Kazuki Yoshinaga (JPN)	1:27.412	QB
5	Mersaid Zhaxybayev (KAZ)	1:27.751	

=== Finals ===
==== Final B ====
Rank	Athlete	Time
1	Han Tianyu (CHN)	1:28.292
2	Kazuki Yoshinaga (JPN)	1:28.390
3	Hiroki Yokoyama (JPN)	1:28.898
4	Adil Galiakhmetov (KAZ)	1:31.417

==== Final A ====
Rank	Athlete	Time
1st place, gold medalist(s)	Seo Yi-ra (KOR)	1:24.097
2nd place, silver medalist(s)	Sin Da-woon (KOR)	1:24.119
3	Lee Jung-su (KOR)	1:24.169
3rd place, bronze medalist(s)	Keita Watanabe (JPN)	1:24.395

- Keita Watanabe was awarded bronze because of no three-medal sweep per country rule.
