= Short-track speed skating at the 2017 Asian Winter Games =

- Venue: Makomanai Ice Arena
- Dates: 20–22 February 2017
- Competitors: 93 from 17 nations

Short-track speed skating at the 2017 Asian Winter Games was held in Sapporo, Japan between 20–22 February at the Makomanai Ice Arena. A total of eight events were contested (four each for men and women).

== Schedule ==
H	Heats	Q	Quarterfinals	S	Semifinals	F	Finals

Event↓/Date →	20th Mon			21st Tue				22nd Wed			
Men's 500 m				H	Q	S	F				
Men's 1000 m								H	Q	S	F
Men's 1500 m	H	S	F								
Men's 5000 m relay	H			S				F			
Women's 500 m				H	Q	S	F				
Women's 1000 m								H	Q	S	F
Women's 1500 m	H	S	F								
Women's 3000 m relay				H				F			

== Medalists ==
=== Men ===
Event	Gold	Silver	Bronze
500 m	Wu Dajing; China	Seo Yi-ra; South Korea	Park Se-yeong; South Korea
1000 m	Seo Yi-ra; South Korea	Sin Da-woon; South Korea	Keita Watanabe; Japan
1500 m	Park Se-yeong; South Korea	Wu Dajing; China	Lee Jung-su; South Korea
5000 m relay	China; Wu Dajing; Han Tianyu; Ren Ziwei; Xu Hongzhi; Shi Jingnan	South Korea; Lee Jung-su; Seo Yi-ra; Sin Da-woon; Park Se-yeong; Han Seung-soo	Japan; Hiroki Yokoyama; Kazuki Yoshinaga; Keita Watanabe; Ryosuke Sakazume; Takayuki Muratake

=== Women ===
Event	Gold	Silver	Bronze
500 m	Zang Yize; China	Ayuko Ito; Japan	Choi Min-jeong; South Korea
1000 m	Shim Suk-hee; South Korea	Choi Min-jeong; South Korea	Sumire Kikuchi; Japan
1500 m	Choi Min-jeong; South Korea	Shim Suk-hee; South Korea	Guo Yihan; China
3000 m relay	South Korea; Shim Suk-hee; Choi Min-jeong; Noh Do-hee; Kim Ji-yoo; Kim Geon-hee	China; Fan Kexin; Qu Chunyu; Zang Yize; Guo Yihan; Lin Yue	Kazakhstan; Kim Iong-a; Anastassiya Krestova; Madina Zhanbussinova; Anita Nagay; Olga Tikhonova

== Medal table ==
Rank	Nation	Gold	Silver	Bronze	Total
1	South Korea (KOR)	5	5	3	13
2	China (CHN)	3	2	1	6
3	Japan (JPN)	0	1	3	4
4	Kazakhstan (KAZ)	0	0	1	1
Totals (4 entries)		8	8	8	24

== Participating nations ==
A total of 93 athletes from 17 nations competed in short-track speed skating at the 2017 Asian Winter Games:

- Australia (6)
- China (10)
- Chinese Taipei (8)
- Hong Kong (2)
- India (6)
- Indonesia (7)
- Japan (10)
- Kazakhstan (10)
- Malaysia (8)
- Mongolia (1)
- New Zealand (2)
- North Korea (4)
- Philippines (1)
- Qatar (3)
- Singapore (2)
- South Korea (10)
- Thailand (3)

* Australia and New Zealand as guest nations, were ineligible to win any medals.
