= Short-track speed skating at the 2017 Asian Winter Games – Men's 500 metres =

Men's 500 metres at the 2017 Asian Winter Games
- Venue: Makomanai Ice Arena
- Dates: 21 February 2017
- Competitors: 39 from 15 nations

Medalists
gold medal	Wu Dajing	China
silver medal	Seo Yi-ra	South Korea
bronze medal	Park Se-yeong	South Korea

The men's 500 metres at the 2017 Asian Winter Games was held on February 21, 2017 in Sapporo, Japan.

== Schedule ==
All times are Japan Standard Time (UTC+09:00)

Date	Time	Event
Tuesday, 21 February 2017	13:36	Heats
Tuesday, 21 February 2017	14:24	Quarterfinals
Tuesday, 21 February 2017	14:57	Semifinals
Tuesday, 21 February 2017	15:27	Finals

== Results ==
Legend

- ADV — Advanced
- PEN — Penalty

=== Heats ===
- Qualification: 1–2 + Four best 3 → Quarterfinals (Q + q)

==== Heat 1 ====
Rank	Athlete	Time	Notes
1	Wu Dajing (CHN)	41.248	Q
2	Kim Chol-gwang (PRK)	43.685	Q
3	Lucas Ng (SGP)	45.115	q
4	Ben Whiteside (NZL)	49.456	
5	Mubarak Al-Mohannadi (QAT)	59.105	

==== Heat 2 ====
Rank	Athlete	Time	Notes
1	Han Seung-soo (KOR)	42.236	Q
2	Kelvin Tsang (HKG)	45.910	Q
3	Teerasak Boonpok (THA)	46.660	
4	Ariff Rasydan Fadzli (MAS)	47.083	
5	Mohammed Al-Sahouti (QAT)	1:08.645	

==== Heat 3 ====
Rank	Athlete	Time	Notes
1	Ren Ziwei (CHN)	41.597	Q
2	Chris Jarden (NZL)	47.209	Q
3	Sohan Sudhir Tarkar (IND)	47.736	
4	Hazim Syahmi Shahrum (MAS)	47.990	
5	Atip Navarat (THA)	49.451	

==== Heat 4 ====
Rank	Athlete	Time	Notes
1	Han Tianyu (CHN)	41.908	Q
2	Su Jun-peng (TPE)	44.070	Q
3	Denali Blunden (AUS)	46.116	q
4	Wong De Vin (MAS)	46.352	
5	Steavanus Wihardja (INA)	1:03.383	

==== Heat 5 ====
Rank	Athlete	Time	Notes
1	Keita Watanabe (JPN)	42.526	Q
2	Sidney Chu (HKG)	45.829	Q
3	Johanes Wihardja (INA)	49.510	
4	Prakit Bovornmongkolsak (THA)	51.832	
5	G. V. Raghavendra (IND)	1:26.586	

==== Heat 6 ====
Rank	Athlete	Time	Notes
1	Park Se-yeong (KOR)	42.306	Q
2	Lin Xian-you (TPE)	44.751	Q
3	Oky Andrianto (INA)	48.930	
4	Andy Jung (AUS)	1:12.243	ADV
5	Yerkebulan Shamukhanov (KAZ)	1:19.276	

==== Heat 7 ====
Rank	Athlete	Time	Notes
1	Takayuki Muratake (JPN)	42.584	Q
2	Adil Galiakhmetov (KAZ)	42.779	Q
3	Keanu Blunden (AUS)	43.279	q
4	Lin Chun-chieh (TPE)	45.804	
5	Jumah Al-Sulaiti (QAT)	1:01.190	

==== Heat 8 ====
Rank	Athlete	Time	Notes
1	Seo Yi-ra (KOR)	41.693	Q
2	Ryosuke Sakazume (JPN)	41.936	Q
3	Mersaid Zhaxybayev (KAZ)	42.431	q
4	Akash Aradhya (IND)	45.457	

=== Quarterfinals ===
- Qualification: 1–2 → Semifinals (Q)

==== Heat 1 ====
Rank	Athlete	Time	Notes
1	Wu Dajing (CHN)	40.761	Q
2	Ryosuke Sakazume (JPN)	40.984	Q
3	Takayuki Muratake (JPN)	41.637	
4	Mersaid Zhaxybayev (KAZ)	45.228	
5	Chris Jarden (NZL)	45.737	

==== Heat 2 ====
Rank	Athlete	Time	Notes
1	Ren Ziwei (CHN)	41.439	Q
2	Keita Watanabe (JPN)	41.638	Q
3	Adil Galiakhmetov (KAZ)	41.834	
4	Keanu Blunden (AUS)	42.271	
5	Kelvin Tsang (HKG)	45.923	

==== Heat 3 ====
Rank	Athlete	Time	Notes
1	Seo Yi-ra (KOR)	41.482	Q
2	Park Se-yeong (KOR)	41.569	Q
3	Kim Chol-gwang (PRK)	43.056	
4	Lucas Ng (SGP)	46.432	
—	Sidney Chu (HKG)	PEN	

==== Heat 4 ====
Rank	Athlete	Time	Notes
1	Han Tianyu (CHN)	41.158	Q
2	Han Seung-soo (KOR)	41.270	Q
3	Andy Jung (AUS)	43.475	
4	Su Jun-peng (TPE)	43.687	
5	Lin Xian-you (TPE)	44.160	
6	Denali Blunden (AUS)	45.311	

=== Semifinals ===
- Qualification: 1–2 → Final A (QA), 3–4 → Final B (QB)

==== Heat 1 ====
Rank	Athlete	Time	Notes
1	Wu Dajing (CHN)	40.714	QA
2	Seo Yi-ra (KOR)	41.042	QA
3	Han Seung-soo (KOR)	41.098	QB
—	Ryosuke Sakazume (JPN)	PEN	

==== Heat 2 ====
Rank	Athlete	Time	Notes
1	Han Tianyu (CHN)	41.296	QA
2	Park Se-yeong (KOR)	41.469	QA
3	Ren Ziwei (CHN)	41.590	QB
4	Keita Watanabe (JPN)	42.206	QB

=== Finals ===
==== Final B ====
Rank	Athlete	Time
1	Ren Ziwei (CHN)	41.608
2	Han Seung-soo (KOR)	41.675
3	Keita Watanabe (JPN)	41.753

==== Final A ====
Rank	Athlete	Time
1st place, gold medalist(s)	Wu Dajing (CHN)	40.764
2nd place, silver medalist(s)	Seo Yi-ra (KOR)	40.842
3rd place, bronze medalist(s)	Park Se-yeong (KOR)	41.182
4	Han Tianyu (CHN)	41.196
