= Short-track speed skating at the 2017 Asian Winter Games – Men's 5000 metre relay =

Sports event in Sapporo, Japan

Men's 5000 metre relay at the 2017 Asian Winter Games
- Venue: Makomanai Ice Arena
- Dates: 20–22 February 2017
- Competitors: 45 from 10 nations

Medalists
gold medal	China; Wu Dajing, Han Tianyu, Ren Ziwei, Xu Hongzhi, Shi Jingnan
silver medal	South Korea; Lee Jung-su, Seo Yi-ra, Sin Da-woon, Park Se-yeong, Han Seung-soo
bronze medal	Japan; Hiroki Yokoyama, Kazuki Yoshinaga, Keita Watanabe, Ryosuke Sakazume, Takayuki Muratake

The men's 5000 metre relay at the 2017 Asian Winter Games was held from February 20 to February 22, 2017, in Sapporo, Japan.

== Schedule ==
All times are Japan Standard Time (UTC+09:00)

Date	Time	Event
Monday, 20 February 2017	15:53	Heats
Tuesday, 21 February 2017	16:03	Semifinals
Wednesday, 22 February 2017	15:25	Finals

== Results ==
Legend

- PEN — Penalty

=== Heats ===
- Qualification: 1–2 + Two best 3 → Semifinals (Q + q)

==== Heat 1 ====
Rank	Team	Time	Notes
1	China (CHN); Ren Ziwei; Han Tianyu; Shi Jingnan; Xu Hongzhi	7:01.394	Q
2	North Korea (PRK); Choe Un-song; Kim Chol-gwang; Kim Tae-song; Kim Pyol-song	7:05.485	Q
—	Chinese Taipei (TPE); Lin Xian-you; Lin Chun-chieh; Tsai Chia-wei; Su Jun-peng	PEN	

==== Heat 2 ====
Rank	Team	Time	Notes
1	South Korea (KOR); Lee Jung-su; Park Se-yeong; Han Seung-soo; Sin Da-woon	6:58.269	Q
2	Australia (AUS); Pierre Boda; Alex Bryant; Andy Jung; Keanu Blunden	7:00.450	Q
3	India (IND); Akash Aradhya; Ashwin D'Silva; G. V. Raghavendra; Sohan Sudhir Tarkar	7:55.159	q

==== Heat 3 ====
Rank	Team	Time	Notes
1	Japan (JPN); Ryosuke Sakazume; Kazuki Yoshinaga; Hiroki Yokoyama; Keita Watanabe	6:48.762	Q
2	Kazakhstan (KAZ); Mersaid Zhaxybayev; Yerkebulan Shamukhanov; Adil Galiakhmetov; Nurtilek Kazhgali	6:53.798	Q
3	Malaysia (MAS); Wong De Vin; Khairil Ridhwan Khalil; Vincent Chan; Hazim Syahmi Shahrum	8:01.319	q
4	Indonesia (INA); Oky Andrianto; Steavanus Wihardja; Johanes Wihardja; Allan Chandra Moedjiono	8:14.994	

=== Semifinals ===
- Qualification: 1–2 → Final A (QA), 3–4 → Final B (QB)

==== Heat 1 ====
Rank	Team	Time	Notes
1	Japan (JPN); Ryosuke Sakazume; Kazuki Yoshinaga; Takayuki Muratake; Keita Watanabe	6:57.188	QA
2	Malaysia (MAS); Hazim Syahmi Shahrum; Vincent Chan; Wong De Vin; Khairil Ridhwan Khalil	8:01.032	QA
—	Kazakhstan (KAZ); Yerkebulan Shamukhanov; Mersaid Zhaxybayev; Adil Galiakhmetov; Kuandyk Suleimenov	PEN	
—	Australia (AUS); Andy Jung; Keanu Blunden; Alex Bryant; Pierre Boda	PEN	

==== Heat 2 ====
Rank	Team	Time	Notes
1	China (CHN); Wu Dajing; Han Tianyu; Xu Hongzhi; Ren Ziwei	6:55.745	QA
2	South Korea (KOR); Sin Da-woon; Han Seung-soo; Lee Jung-su; Park Se-yeong	6:55.831	QA
3	North Korea (PRK); Choe Un-song; Kim Chol-gwang; Kim Tae-song; Kim Pyol-song	7:03.562	QB
—	India (IND); Akash Aradhya; Ashwin D'Silva; G. V. Raghavendra; Sohan Sudhir Tarkar	PEN	

=== Finals ===
==== Final B ====
Rank	Team	Time
1	North Korea (PRK); Choe Un-song; Kim Chol-gwang; Kim Tae-song; Kim Pyol-song	

==== Final A ====
Rank	Team	Time
1st place, gold medalist(s)	China (CHN); Wu Dajing; Han Tianyu; Ren Ziwei; Xu Hongzhi	7:01.983
2nd place, silver medalist(s)	South Korea (KOR); Lee Jung-su; Seo Yi-ra; Sin Da-woon; Park Se-yeong	7:02.703
3rd place, bronze medalist(s)	Japan (JPN); Hiroki Yokoyama; Kazuki Yoshinaga; Keita Watanabe; Ryosuke Sakazume	7:02.909
4	Malaysia (MAS); Hazim Syahmi Shahrum; Wong De Vin; Khairil Ridhwan Khalil; Ariff Rasydan Fadzli	8:13.362
