= 2011 World Junior Short Track Speed Skating Championships – Men's 3000 metre relay =

The Men's 3000 metre relay at the 2011 World Junior Short Track Speed Skating Championships will begin on 25 February, and are scheduled to end on 27 February at the Forum Sport Center ice rink.

== Results ==
Top 2 Relays from each heat qualify for Semifinals.

Heat 1

Rank	Country	Athlete	Time	Notes
1	Kazakhstan	Fedor Andreyev; Abzal Azhgaliyev; Aydar Bezhanov	4:13.188	Q
2	United States	Cole Krueger; John-Henry Krueger; James Rodowsky	4:16.938	Q
3	Ukraine	Valentyn Danilovskyi; Artem Khmelevsky; Maksim Zhernovy	4:22.975	
4	China	Songbo Liu; Jingnan Shi; Dajing Wu		DSQ

Heat 3

Rank	Country	Athlete	Time	Notes
1	France	Thibault Crolet; Sebastien LePape; Alexis Yang	4:12.522	Q
2	United Kingdom	Joshua Cheetham; Billy Simms; Jack Whelbourne	4:16.578	Q
3	Netherlands	Christiaan Bokkerink; Itzhak De Laat; Adwin Snellink	4:19.104	
4	Australia	Lazenby Armstrong; Pierre Boda; Angus McCulloch	4:19.552	

Heat 2

Rank	Country	Athlete	Time	Notes
1	South Korea	Jun Ho Jung; Hyo Been Lee; Yi Ra Seo	4:13.532	Q
2	Japan	Minto Sekai; Keita Watanabe; Hiroki Yokoyama	4:15.675	Q
3	Hungary	Bence Beres; Sandor Shaolin Liu; Bence Olah	4:20.112	
4	Germany	Jonas Kaufmann-Ludwig; Christoph Schubert; Felix Spiegel	4:29.828	

Heat 4

Rank	Country	Athlete	Time	Notes
1	Canada	Patrick Duffy; Pier-Olivier Gagnon; Alexandre St. Jean	4:17.504	Q
2	Poland	Jakub Borowski; Sebastian Klosinski; Dawid Rzemieniecki	4:18.06	Q
3	Russia	Emil Karneev; Dmitry Migunov; Timur Zakharov	4:20.039	
4	Italy	Andrea Cassinelli; Tommaso Dotti; Francesco Palla	4:42.852	
