= Short-track speed skating at the 2018 Winter Olympics – Men's 5000 metre relay =

Men’s 5000 metre relay at the XXIII Olympic Winter Games
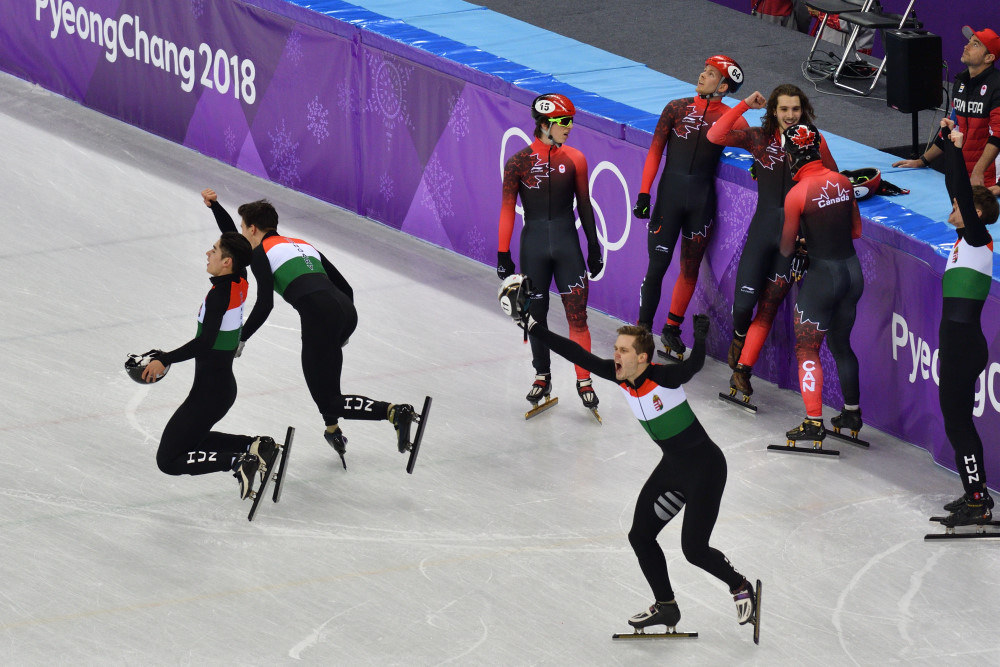
- Team Hungary celebrates their victory
- Venue: Gangneung Ice Arena; Gangneung, South Korea
- Dates: 13 February 2018 (semifinals); 22 February 2018 (finals)
- Competitors: 34 from 8 nations
- Winning time: 6:31.971

Medalists
1st place, gold medalist(s)		Shaoang Liu; Shaolin Sándor Liu; Viktor Knoch; Csaba Burján	Hungary
2nd place, silver medalist(s)		Wu Dajing; Han Tianyu; Chen Dequan; Xu Hongzhi; Ren Ziwei	China
3rd place, bronze medalist(s)		Samuel Girard; Charles Hamelin; Charle Cournoyer; Pascal Dion	Canada

The Men’s 5000 metre relay in short track speed skating at the 2018 Winter Olympics took place on 13 and 22 February 2018 at the Gangneung Ice Arena in Gangneung, South Korea. The race was won by Hungary, this was Hungary's first ever Winter Olympics gold medal.

== Records ==
Prior to this competition, the existing world and Olympic records were as follows.

World record	United States; Keith Carroll; J. R. Celski; Thomas Hong; John-Henry Krueger	6:29.052	Shanghai, China	12 November 2017
Olympic record	Russia; Viktor Ahn; Semion Elistratov; Vladimir Grigorev; Ruslan Zakharov	6:42.100	Sochi, Russia	21 February 2014

Two Olympic records were set during the competition.

Date	Round	Athlete	Country	Time	Record	Ref
13 February	Semifinal 2	Hwang Dae-heon; Kim Do-kyoum; Kwak Yoon-gy; Lim Hyo-jun	South Korea	6:34.510	OR	
22 February	Final 2	Shaoang Liu; Shaolin Sándor Liu; Viktor Knoch; Csaba Burján	Hungary	6:31.971	OR	

== Results ==
=== Semifinals ===
The semifinals were held on 13 February.

QA – qualified for Final A
QB – qualified for Final B
PEN – penalty

Rank	Semifinal	Country	Athletes	Time	Notes
1	1	China	Wu Dajing; Han Tianyu; Ren Ziwei; Xu Hongzhi	6:36.605	QA
2	1	Canada	Samuel Girard; Charles Hamelin; Charle Cournoyer; Pascal Dion	6:41.042	QA
3	1	Kazakhstan	Denis Nikisha; Nurbergen Zhumagaziyev; Abzal Azhgaliyev; Yerkebulan Shamukhanov	6:47.727	QB
	1	Netherlands	Sjinkie Knegt; Daan Breeuwsma; Itzhak de Laat; Dennis Visser		PEN
1	2	South Korea	Hwang Dae-heon; Kim Do-kyoum; Kwak Yoon-gy; Lim Hyo-jun	6:34.510	QA, OR
2	2	Hungary	Shaoang Liu; Shaolin Sándor Liu; Viktor Knoch; Csaba Burján	6:34.866	QA
3	2	United States	J. R. Celski; John-Henry Krueger; Thomas Hong; Aaron Tran	6:36.867	QB
4	2	Japan	Keita Watanabe; Ryosuke Sakazume; Kazuki Yoshinaga; Hiroki Yokoyama	6:42.655	QB

=== Finals ===
==== Final B (classification round) ====
Rank	Country	Athletes	Time	Notes
5	United States	J. R. Celski; John-Henry Krueger; Thomas Hong; Aaron Tran	6:52.708	
6	Kazakhstan	Denis Nikisha; Nurbergen Zhumagaziyev; Abzal Azhgaliyev; Yerkebulan Shamukhanov	6:52.791	
7	Japan	Keita Watanabe; Ryosuke Sakazume; Kazuki Yoshinaga; Hiroki Yokoyama	7:02.554	

==== Final A (medal round) ====
The final was held on 22 February.

Rank	Country	Athletes	Time	Notes
1st place, gold medalist(s)	Hungary	Shaoang Liu; Shaolin Sándor Liu; Viktor Knoch; Csaba Burján	6:31.971	OR
2nd place, silver medalist(s)	China	Wu Dajing; Han Tianyu; Xu Hongzhi; Chen Dequan	6:32.035	
3rd place, bronze medalist(s)	Canada	Samuel Girard; Charles Hamelin; Charle Cournoyer; Pascal Dion	6:32.282	
4	South Korea	Seo Yi-ra; Kim Do-kyoum; Kwak Yoon-gy; Lim Hyo-jun	6:42.118	
