= Indonesia at the 2017 Asian Winter Games =

- IOC code: INA
- NOC: Indonesian Olympic Committee

in Sapporo and Obihiro 19–26 February
- Competitors: 34 in 3 sports
- Flag bearer: Jonathan Sudharta
- Medals: Gold 0 Silver 0 Bronze 0 Total 0

Asian Winter Games appearances
- 2017; 2025; 2029

Indonesia competed in the 2017 Asian Winter Games in Sapporo and Obihiro, Japan from 19 to 26 February, supported by Indonesian Olympic Committee & IWSC Indonesia. The country competed in two sports (three disciplines). The Indonesian team consisted of 34 athletes. This was the first time Indonesia take part at the Asian Winter Games.

== Competitors ==
The following table lists the Indonesian delegation per sport and gender.

Sport	Men	Women	Total
Figure skating	2	2	4
Ice hockey	23	0	23
Short track speed skating	4	3	7
Total	29	5	34

== Figure skating ==
Indonesia competed in the figure skating competitions.

Singles

Athlete(s)	Event	SP		FP		Total	
Athlete(s)	Event	Points	Rank	Points	Rank	Points	Rank
Dwiki Eka Ramadhan	Men's	24.07	20	64.65	19	88.72	20
William Sutrisna	Men's	34.85	19	60.80	20	95.65	19
Nurul Ayinie	Women's	16.81	24	30.88	24	47.69	24
Tasya Putri	Women's	22.21	20	48.01	20	70.22	20

== Ice hockey ==
Indonesia entered a men's hockey team. The team competed in division two. Indonesia finished in eighth (and last) place (18th place overall) in division 2 of the competition.

=== Men's tournament ===
Indonesia was represented by the following 23 athletes:

- Zaharul Haq (G)
- Sangga Putra (G)
- Susanto (G)
- Muchammad Athalaa (D)
- Victor Budiwarman (D)
- Ronald Chandra (D)
- Andianto Hie (D)
- Stephanus Sugianto (D)
- Rinaldo Sutjipto (D)
- Syailendra Bakrie (F)
- Felix Cahyono (F)
- Jusuf Hendrata (F)
- Aditya Landreth (F)
- Yaser Muhammad (F)
- Abraham Novendra (F)
- Roy Nugraha (F)
- Anryan Saputra (F)
- Jonathan Sudharta (F)
- Stefanus Suryadi (F)
- Felix Utama (F)
- Ronald Wijaya (F)
- Ready Wongso (F)
- Felix Yussanto (F)

Legend: G = Goalie, D = Defense-man, F = Forward

Group B

Rank	Team	Pld	W	OW	OL	L	GF	GA	GD	Pts
1	Turkmenistan	3	3	0	0	0	37	4	+33	9
2	Macau	3	2	0	0	1	15	22	–7	6
3	Malaysia	3	1	0	0	2	19	20	–1	3
4	Indonesia	3	0	0	0	3	6	31	–25	0

21 February 2017; 13:00	Malaysia	13–2 (6–1, 3–1, 4–0)	Indonesia	Hoshioki Ice Skating Rink; Attendance: 146

Game reference
47 min	Penalties	26 min
40	Shots	12

23 February 2017; 13:00	Macau	6–2 (2–0, 4–0, 0–2)	Indonesia	Hoshioki Ice Skating Rink; Attendance: 87

Game reference
22 min	Penalties	14 min
42	Shots	25

24 February 2017; 13:00	Indonesia	2–12 (1–5, 0–5, 1–2)	Turkmenistan	Hoshioki Ice Skating Rink; Attendance: 102

Game reference
2 min	Penalties	8 min
11	Shots	71

== Short track speed skating ==
Men

Athlete	Event	Heat		Quarterfinal		Semifinal		Final	
Athlete	Event	Time	Rank	Time	Rank	Time	Rank	Time	Rank
Oky Andrianto	500 m	48.930	3	did not advance					
Johanes Wihardja	500 m	49.510	3	did not advance					
Steavanus Wihardja	500 m	1:03.383	5	did not advance					
Okky Andrianto	1000 m	1:39.051	4	did not advance					
Steavanus Wihardja	1000 m	1:39.367	4	did not advance					
Allan Chandra Moedjiono	1000 m	1:48.441	4	did not advance					
Okky Andrianto	1500 m	2:48.962	5	did not advance					
Allan Chandra Moedjiono	1500 m	2:55.645	4	did not advance					
Johanes Wihardja	1500 m	DSQ		did not advance					
Steavanus Wihardja; Okky Andrianto; Allan Chandra Modejiono; Johanes Wihardja	5000 m	8:14.994	4	did not advance					

Qualification legend: Q - Qualify based on position in heat; q - Qualify based on time in field; FA - Qualify to medal final; FB - Qualify to consolation final
