= Malaysia at the 2011 Asian Winter Games =

- IOC code: MAS
- NOC: Olympic Council of Malaysia
- Website: www.olympic.org.my (in English)

in Astana and Almaty
- Competitors: 22 in 2 sports
- Flag bearer: Haniff Mahmood
- Medals: Gold 0 Silver 0 Bronze 0 Total 0

Asian Winter Games appearances
- 2007; 2011; 2017; 2025; 2029

Malaysia participated in the 2011 Asian Winter Games in Almaty and Astana, Kazakhstan from 30 January 2011 to 6 February 2011.

== Figure skating ==
Malaysia sent 2 figure skaters.

Athlete(s)	Event	SP/SP		FS/LP		Total	
Athlete(s)	Event	Points	Rank	Points	Rank	Points	Rank
Ryan Yee Zhi Jwen	Men's singles	37.25	12	66.31	13	103.56	13
Ching Siau Chian	Women's singles	22.33	16	45.66	15	67.99	15

== Ice hockey ==
=== Men's tournament ===
Malaysia sent a men's hockey team. Malaysia was in the premier division.

Team roster

- Abdul Hakim Ismail
- Ahmad Bazli Abu Safian
- Allan Yeoh Keong Yau
- Andy Chang Yew Ming
- Aris Samad Yahaya
- Brandon Tan Wai Kin
- Edmond Ng Eng Kuan
- Gabriel Ong Meng Huei
- Haniff Mahmood
- Jamil David Ahmad Mokhtar
- Jeremy Chee Tack Hoong
- Khoo Seng Chee
- Loke Ban Kin
- Moi Jia Yung
- Reezman Isa
- Tan Kay Seng
- Tan Khia Peng
- Tengku Muhammad Azlly
- Vincent Matthew Loh
- Yap Eu Jin

Head coach: Martin Koloc

Premier Division

Rank	Team	Pld	W	OW	OL	L	GF	GA	GD	Pts
6	Kyrgyzstan	6	6	0	0	0	95	23	+72	18
7	Thailand	6	5	0	0	1	70	22	+48	15
8	United Arab Emirates	6	4	0	0	2	48	27	+21	12
9	Mongolia	6	3	0	0	3	35	37	−2	9
10	Malaysia	6	2	0	0	4	46	59	−13	6
11	Athletes from Kuwait	6	1	0	0	5	41	40	+1	3
12	Bahrain	6	0	0	0	6	11	138	−127	0

28 January; 17:00	Malaysia	25 – 0 (4–0, 8–0, 13–0)	Bahrain	Kazakhstan Sports Palace 2, Astana; Attendance: 300

Game reference

Tengku Mohd Azlly
Goalies
Abdulla Al-Adhab (out 20:00, in 20:06, out 35:22)
Mohamed Al-Doy (in 20:00, out 20:06, in 35:22)
Referee:
Kimikazu Koizumi (JPN)

Loke B.K. (David) – 10:11	1–0
David (Loke B.K.) (PP) – 12:03	2–0
Loke B.K. – 12:58	3–0
Khoo S.C. (Moi J.Y.) – 17:58	4–0
Loke B.K. – 20:06	5–0
Moi J.Y. (Khoo S.C.) (PP) – 24:32	6–0
Tan K.P. (Loke B.K., Yahaya) – 30:50	7–0
Moi J.Y. (Khoo S.C.) – 31:31	8–0
Tan K.S. (Moi J.Y., Chee) (PP) – 34:01	9–0
David (Loke B.K.) – 35:22	10–0
Tan K.P. (Loke B.K.) – 35:30	11–0
Loke B.K. (David) (SH) – 38:31	12–0
Yeoh K.Y. (Ong) – 41:55	13–0
Chee (Khoo S.C.) – 43:32	14–0
Tan K.P. (Loke B.K.) – 49:28	15–0
Loke B.K. – 49:46	16–0
Loke B.K. (Tan K.P., Yap E.J.) – 52:08	17–0
Chee – 52:26	18–0
Tan K.P. (Loke B.K., Yahaya) – 53:47	19–0
Chee – 55:13	20–0
David (Loke B.K.) – 56:40	21–0
Chee (Mahmood) – 57:41	22–0
B. Tan (Yap E.J.) – 58:01	23–0
Tan K.P. (Yahaya, Loke B.K.) (PP) – 59:43	24–0
Loke B.K. – 59:56	25–0

8 min
Penalties
14 min
72
Shots
8

29 January; 20:30	Athletes from Kuwait	7 – 12 (1–5, 2–4, 4–3)	Malaysia	Kazakhstan Sports Palace 2, Astana; Attendance: 200

Game reference

Jasem Al-Sarraf (out 13:41, in 34:11)
Jasem Dashti (in 13:41, out 34:11)
Goalies
Tengku Mohd Azlly
Referee:
Andrey Sachuk (KAZ)

	0–1	00:24 – Loke B.K.
	0–2	00:58 – Tan K.S. (Khoo S.C.)
	0–3	03:32 – Yahaya (Tan K.P.) (PP2)
	0–4	09:43 – Loke B.K. (Tan K.P.) (PP)
	0–5	13:41 – Tan K.P. (Ong) (PP)
A. Al-Ajmi (Atallah, Y. Al-Kandari) – 15:32	1–5
	1–6	24:07 – Tan K.S. (Chee, Yeoh K.Y.)
	1–7	25:43 – Chee
	1–8	33:00 – Tan K.S. (Isa)
	1–9	34:11 – Loke B.K.
A. Al-Ajmi (A. Al-Maragi) – 34:56	2–9
Mo. Al-Ajmi (Atallah) – 37:05	3–9
A. Shetail (A. Al-Ajmi) – 41:56	4–9
Mo. Al-Ajmi (PP) – 43:14	5–9
A. Al-Maragi (Me. Al-Ajmi) – 44:43	6–9
	6–10	46:38 – Loke B.K.
	6–11	50:51 – Loke B.K. (SH)
	6–12	54:19 – Tan K.P. (Loke B.K.) (PP)
A. Al-Ajmi (Mo. Al-Ajmi) (PP) – 55:10	7–12

32 min
Penalties
22 min
30
Shots
41

1 February; 13:30	Kyrgyzstan	23 – 2 (11–0, 8–1, 4–1)	Malaysia	Kazakhstan Sports Palace 2, Astana; Attendance: 200

Game reference

Sergey Ossintsev (out 29:04)
Zhirgalbek Bakirov (in 29:04)
Goalies
Abdul Hakim Ismail (out 3:15)
Tengku Mohd Azlly (in 3:15)
Referee:
Keith Fong (CAN)

Kabanov (Zhuravlyov) – 01:28	1–0
Kabanov (Zhuravlyov) – 01:47	2–0
Falfudinov (Shiderinov, Kolobov) – 02:58	3–0
Kabanov (Zhuravlyov, S. Sorokin) – 03:15	4–0
Sazonov (Sheishenaliev) – 04:46	5–0
Kryukov (Kolobov, Falfudinov) – 06:09	6–0
Omorkanov (Zhuravlyov, Kabanov) – 06:44	7–0
Shiderinov (Kolobov) – 09:04	8–0
Omorkanov (Falfudinov) – 09:27	9–0
Kabanov (V. Sorokin) – 13:23	10–0
Kryukov (Shiderinov, Kolobov) – 18:03	11–0
Omorkanov (Zhuravlyov, Kabanov) – 22:16	12–0
Fillippov (Kryukov, Kolobov) – 25:31	13–0
Kabanov (Zhuravlyov) – 25:51	14–0
	14–1	27:45 – Chang (B. Tan)
Tynaliev (Kolobov, Shiderinov) – 29:04	15–1
Tynaliev (Shiderinov, Kolobov) – 33:08	16–1
Kabanov (Bakirov, V. Sorokin) – 35:39	17–1
Fillippov (Kryukov, Tynaliev) – 37:43	18–1
S. Sorokin (Zhuravlyov, V. Sorokin) – 39:17	19–1
Tynaliev (Shiderinov, Kolobov) – 41:25	20–1
	20–2	46:33 – Tan K.S. (Yeoh K.Y.)
V. Sorokin (Omorkanov, Kabanov) – 47:30	21–2
Omorkanov (Zhuravlyov, Kabanov) – 52:04	22–2
Esen Uulu (Askarbekov, Kudayarov) – 53:12	23–2

2 min
Penalties
2 min
61
Shots
13

2 February; 20:30	Thailand	16 – 1 (7–0, 7–0, 2–1)	Malaysia	Kazakhstan Sports Palace 2, Astana; Attendance: 300

Game reference

Jason Cotsmire
Goalies
Tengku Mohd Azlly (out 36:10)
Abdul Hakim Ismail (in 36:10)
Referee:
Liu Wubin (CHN)

Ct. Supadilokluk (Chartsuwan) (PP) – 02:09	1–0
Chartsuwan (Neimwan) – 05:33	2–0
Rattanachot (Aarola) (PP) – 10:09	3–0
Chartsuwan (Aarola) (PP) – 11:29	4–0
Aarola – 13:24	5–0
Chartsuwan (Aarola) – 16:43	6–0
Aarola (Rattanachot) (SH) – 18:56	7–0
Thamwongsin (Tengsakul) – 27:47	8–0
Aarola (Rattanachot) – 30:20	9–0
Chartsuwan (Rattanachot) – 30:35	10–0
Chartsuwan (Aarola, Neimwan) – 34:53	11–0
Aarola (Chartsuwan, Rattanachot) – 35:47	12–0
Kullugin (Tengsakul) – 36:10	13–0
Harnnarujchai (Pivekumt) – 38:16	14–0
	14–1	48:50 – Yap E.J. (David)
Neimwan (Rodprasert) – 53:14	15–1
Jittranont – 56:25	16–1

8 min
Penalties
24 min
55
Shots
15

4 February; 20:30	Malaysia	1 – 7 (0–1, 1–2, 0–4)	United Arab Emirates	Kazakhstan Sports Palace 2, Astana; Attendance: 200

Game reference

Tengku Mohd Azlly
Goalies
Ahmed Al-Dhaheri
Referee:
Keith Fong (CAN)

	0–1	14:22 – J. Al-Dhaheri (Al-Jachi, O. Al-Shamisi)
	0–2	24:55 – Al-Mheiri (SH)
	0–3	31:32 – O. Al-Shamisi (Al-Subousi)
David (Yap E.J., Loke B.K.) (PP) – 38:01	1–3
	1–4	44:19 – Al. Al-Mazrouei (Al-Jachi) (PP2)
	1–5	48:57 – Bu-Debs (J. Al-Dhaheri) (PP)
	1–6	50:22 – Al-Nuaimi (Al-Muharami)
	1–7	58:46 – O. Al-Shamisi

16 min
Penalties
22 min
14
Shots
44

5 February; 17:00	Malaysia	5 – 6 (1–1, 4–3, 0–2)	Mongolia	Kazakhstan Sports Palace 2, Astana; Attendance: 200

Game reference

Tengku Mohd Azlly
Goalies
Batsukh Battur
Referee:
Choi Yoon-Young (KOR)

David (Chee, Tan K.P.) – 07:52	1–0
	1–1	08:32 – Batzaya (Mishigsuren)
Loke B.K. – 20:55	2–1
	2–2	26:46 – Erdenebat (Zolboo, Bolor-Erdene)
Loke B.K. (David) – 27:27	3–2
	3–3	35:07 – Batzaya (Mishigsuren)
Tan K.P. (SH) – 36:16	4–3
David (Loke B.K., Tan K.P.) (PP) – 39:00	5–3
	5–4	39:41 – Purev-Ochir (Mishigsuren)
	5–5	45:47 – Chuluunzorig (Batgerel)
	5–6	47:57 – Batzaya

8 min
Penalties
12 min
30
Shots
34
