= Short-track speed skating at the 2014 Winter Olympics – Men's 500 metres =

Men's 500 metres at the XXII Olympic Winter Games
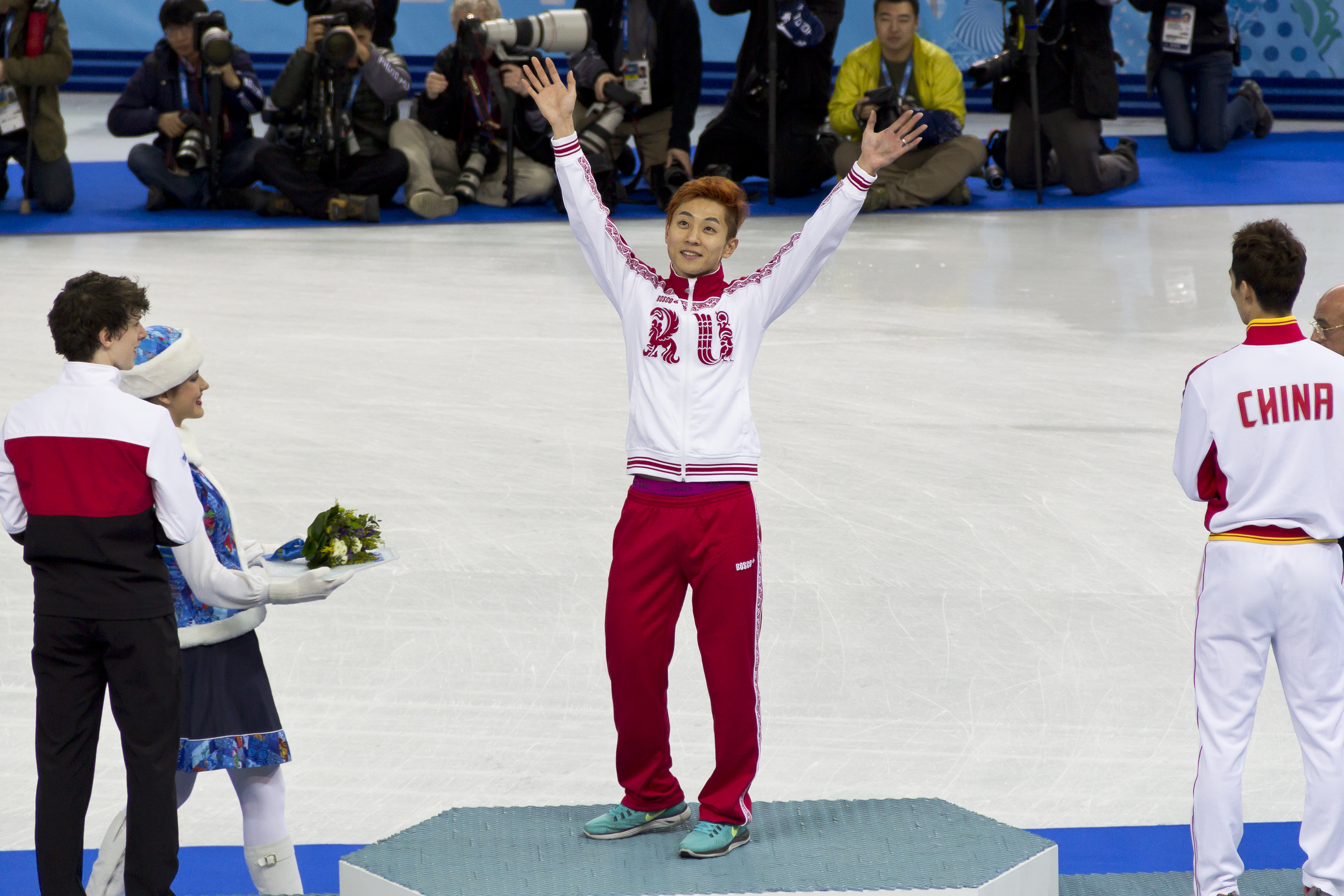
- Podium
- Venue: Iceberg Skating Palace; Sochi, Russia
- Dates: 18 February 2014 (qualifying heats); 21 February 2014 (quarterfinal, semifinal, and final)
- Competitors: 32 from 16 nations
- Winning time: 41.312

Medalists
1st place, gold medalist(s)		Victor Ahn	Russia
2nd place, silver medalist(s)		Wu Dajing	China
3rd place, bronze medalist(s)		Charle Cournoyer	Canada

The men's 500 metres in short track speed skating at the 2014 Winter Olympics was held between 18–21 February 2014 at the Iceberg Skating Palace in Sochi, Russia.

The qualifying heats was held on 18 February with the quarterfinal, the semifinal, and final on 21 February.

The defending Olympic Champion was Charles Hamelin of Canada, while the defending World Champion was Liang Wenhao of China. None of them won a medal.

Viktor Ahn of Russia won the race, getting the third individual medal in short track speed skating at the same Olympics (two golds and one bronze) and thus replicating his own performance at the 2006 Winter Olympics. No other male short track skater ever won three individual medals at the same Olympics. Wu Dajing of China finished second, and Charle Cournoyer of Canada won the bronze medal.

== Qualification ==
Countries were assigned quotas using a combination of the four special Olympic Qualification classifications that were held at two world cups in November 2013. A nation may enter a maximum of three athletes per event. For this event a total of 32 athletes representing 16 nations qualified to compete.

== Results ==
The event was started at 20:30.

=== Preliminaries ===
==== Heats ====
Q – qualified for Quarterfinals
ADV – advanced
PEN – penalty

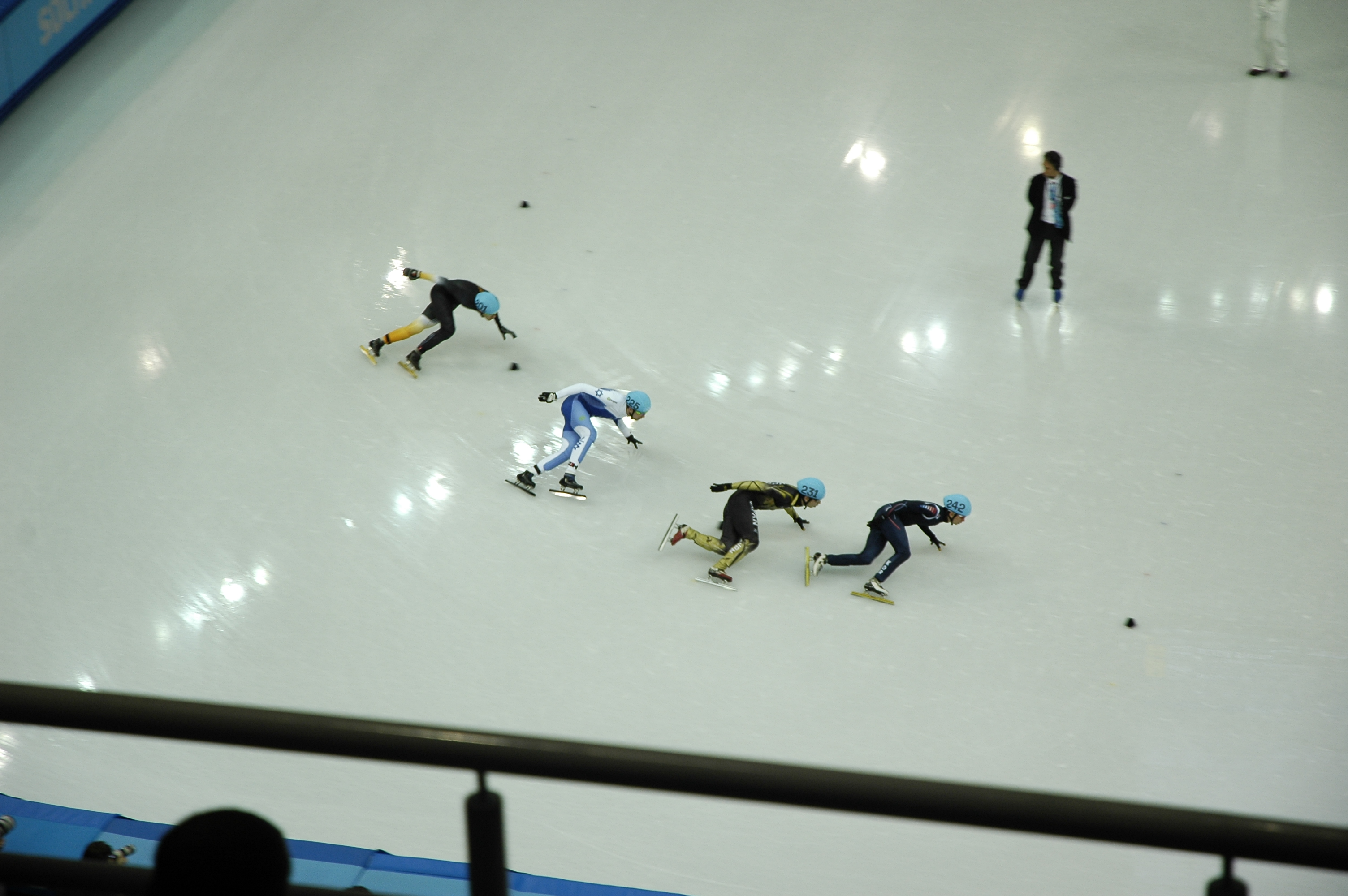
Heat 1

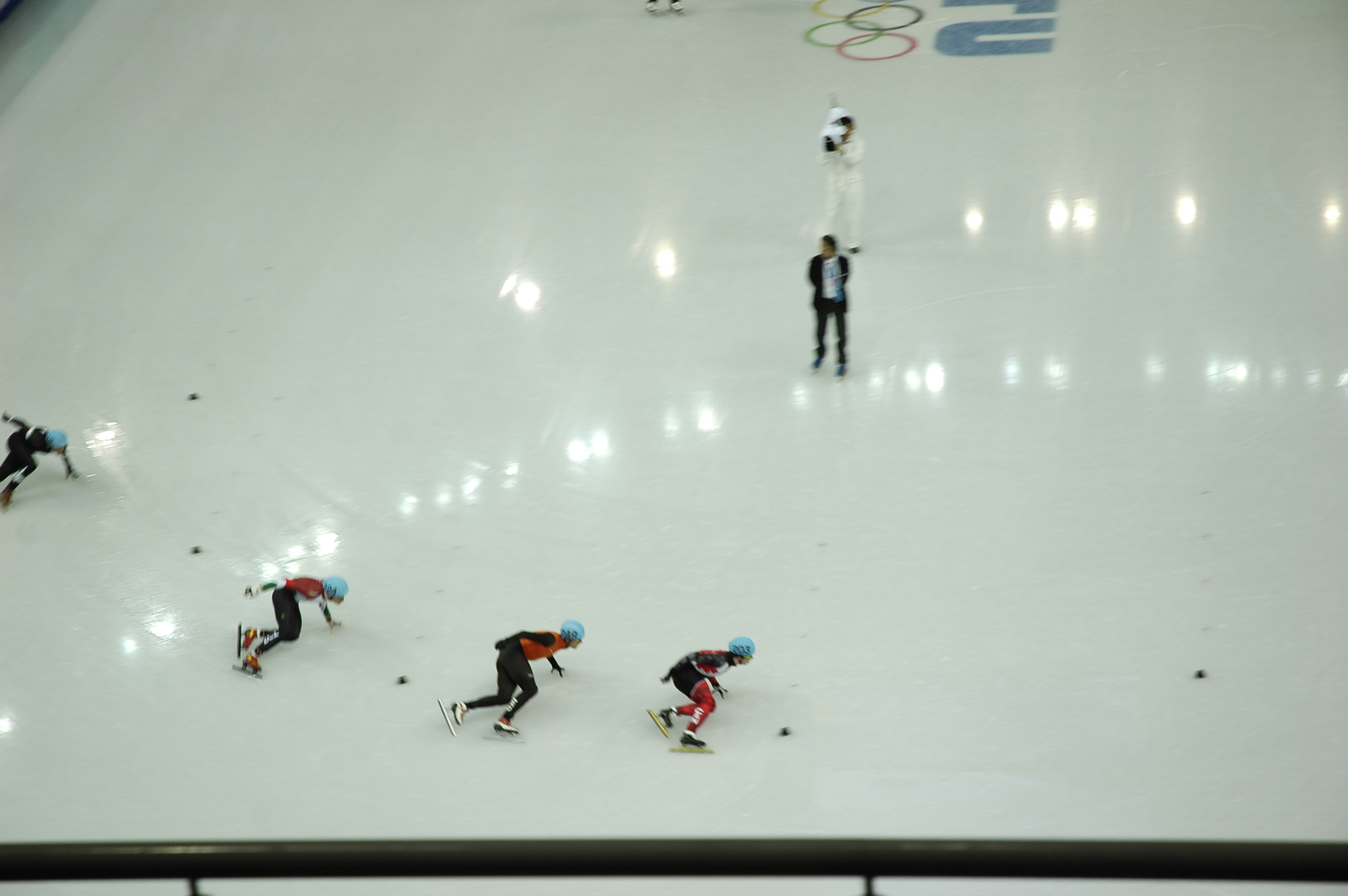
Heat 2

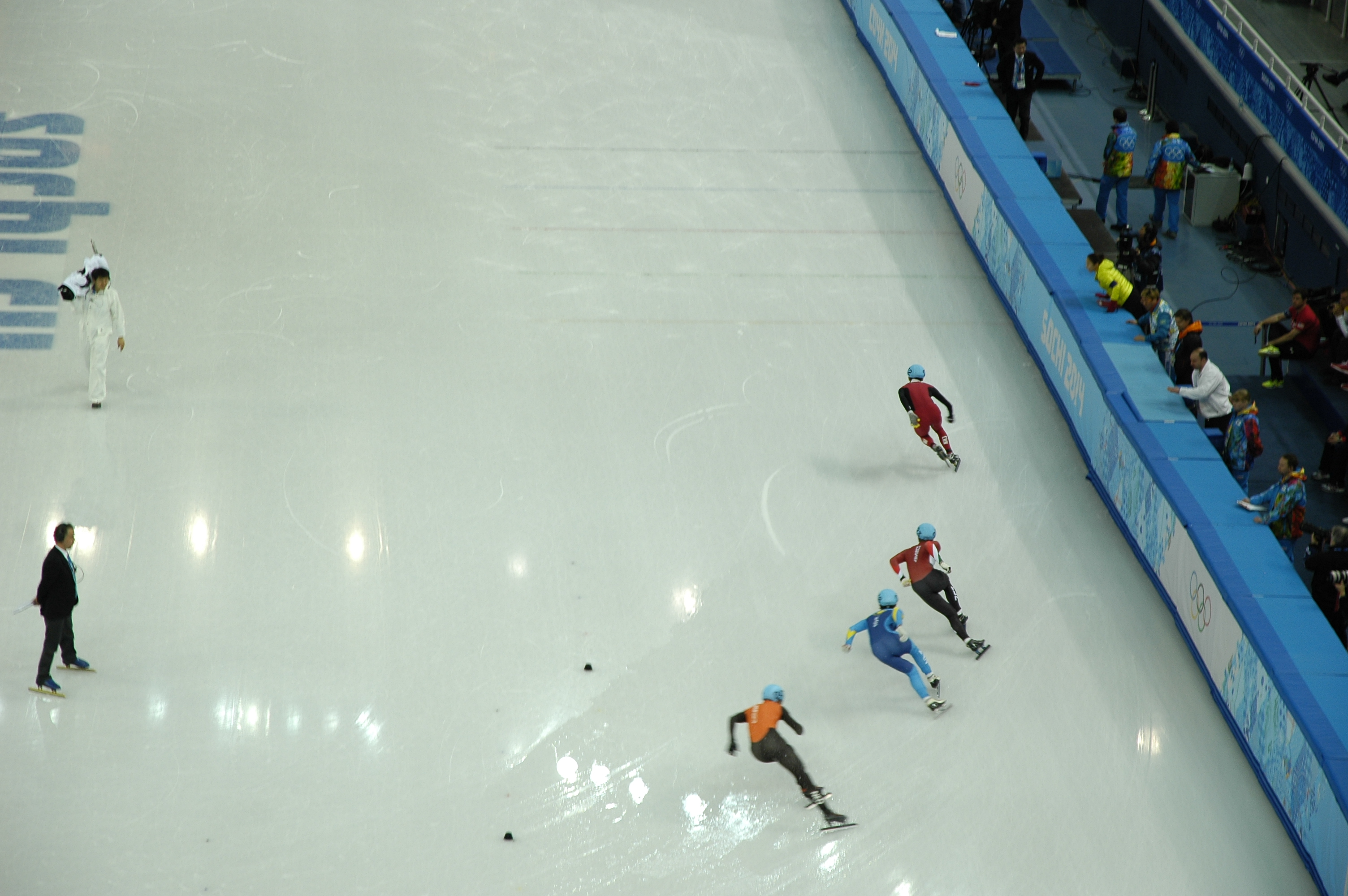
Heat 6

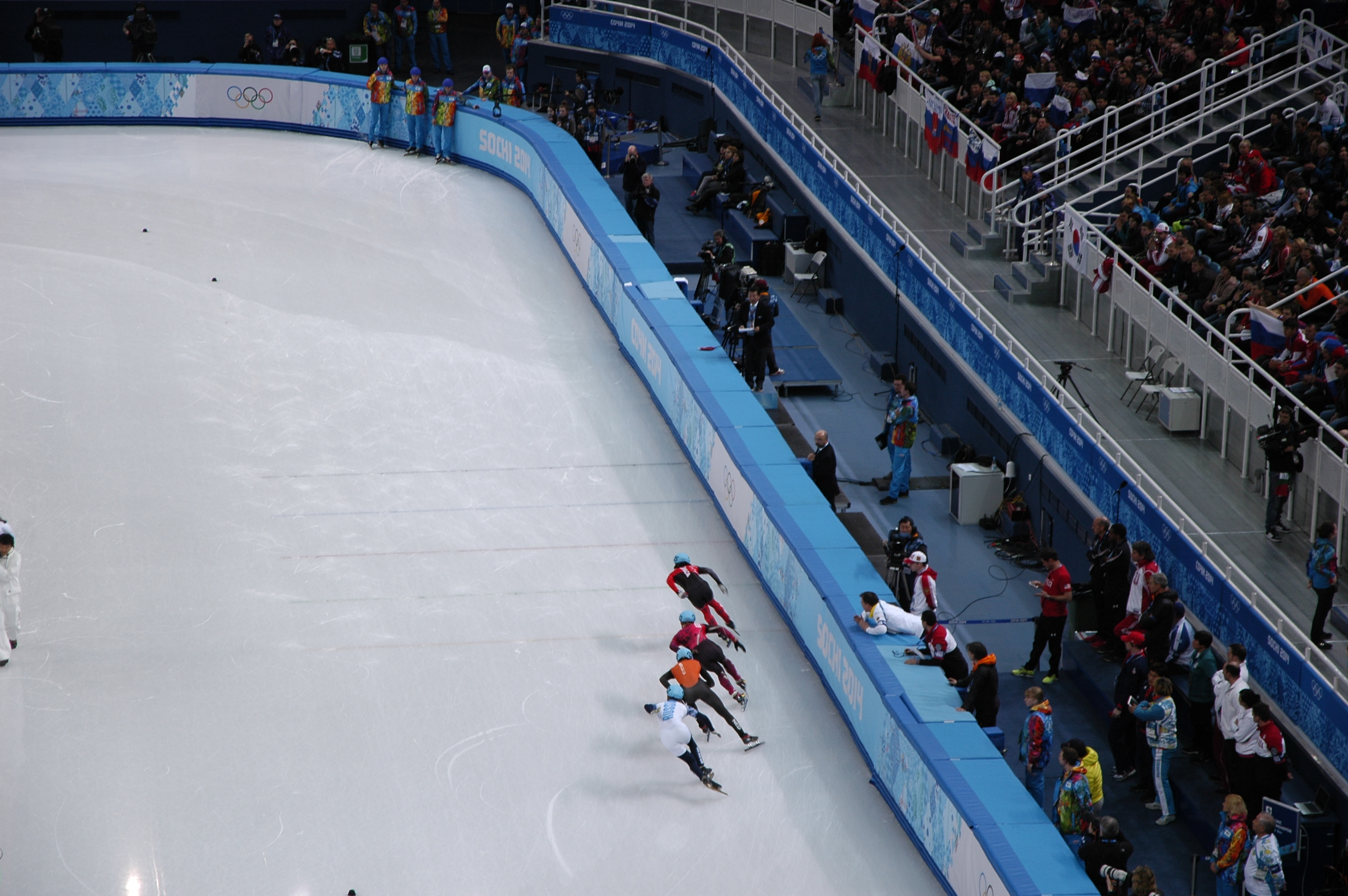
Heat 8

Rank	Heat	Name	Country	Time	Notes
1	1	Park Se-yeong	South Korea	41.566	Q
2	1	Satoshi Sakashita	Japan	41.629	Q
3	1	Vladislav Bykanov	Israel	41.769	
4	1	Pierre Boda	Australia	42.702	
1	2	Charle Cournoyer	Canada	41.180	Q
2	2	Freek van der Wart	Netherlands	41.190	Q
3	2	Sándor Liu Shaolin	Hungary	41.683	
4	2	Anthony Lobello	Italy	42.133	
1	3	Liang Wenhao	China	41.647	Q
2	3	Lee Han-bin	South Korea	41.982	Q
3	3	Yuri Confortola	Italy	42.042	
4	3	Eduardo Alvarez	United States	1:15.108	
1	4	Han Tianyu	China	41.592	Q
2	4	Vladimir Grigorev	Russia	41.883	Q
3	4	Sébastien Lepape	France	42.167	
4	4	Jack Whelbourne	Great Britain	42.513	
1	5	Viktor Ahn	Russia	41.450	Q
2	5	Jon Eley	Great Britain	41.554	Q
3	5	Aidar Bekzhanov	Kazakhstan	41.800	
4	5	Jordan Malone	United States	42.533	
1	6	Wu Dajing	China	41.712	Q
2	6	Viktor Knoch	Hungary	42.261	Q
3	6	Niels Kerstholt	Netherlands	42.441	
4	6	Nurbergen Zhumagaziyev	Kazakhstan	42.680	
1	7	Olivier Jean	Canada	41.616	Q
2	7	J. R. Celski	United States	41.717	Q
3	7	Mackenzie Blackburn	Chinese Taipei	42.337	
4	7	Thibaut Fauconnet	France	42.368	
1	8	Sjinkie Knegt	Netherlands	41.235	Q
2	8	Semen Elistratov	Russia	41.355	Q
3	8	Robert Seifert	Germany	41.624	
4	8	Charles Hamelin	Canada	1:18.871	

==== Quarterfinal ====
Q – qualified for Semifinals
ADV – advanced
PEN – penalty

Rank	Quarterfinal	Name	Country	Time	Notes
1	1	Sjinkie Knegt	Netherlands	41.683	Q
2	1	Liang Wenhao	China	41.817	Q
3	1	Viktor Knoch	Hungary	42.043	
–	1	Semen Elistratov	Russia		PEN
1	2	Han Tianyu	China	41.390	Q
2	2	J. R. Celski	United States	53.178	Q
3	2	Satoshi Sakashita	Japan	59.249	ADV
–	2	Park Se-yeong	South Korea		PEN
1	3	Wu Dajing	China	41.056	Q
2	3	Charle Cournoyer	Canada	41.060	Q
3	3	Freek van der Wart	Netherlands	1:01.371	
–	3	Vladimir Grigorev	Russia		PEN
1	4	Viktor Ahn	Russia	41.257	Q
2	4	Jon Eley	Great Britain	41.337	Q
3	4	Lee Han-bin	South Korea	41.471	
4	4	Olivier Jean	Canada	41.760	

==== Semifinals ====
QA – qualified for Final A
QB – qualified for Final B
ADV – advanced
PEN – penalty
YC – yellow card

Rank	Semifinal	Name	Country	Time	Notes
1	1	Wu Dajing	China	40.846	QA
2	1	Charle Cournoyer	Canada	40.945	QA
3	1	Han Tianyu	China	41.151	QB
4	1	J. R. Celski	United States	41.152	QB
5	1	Satoshi Sakashita	Japan	41.661	
1	2	Viktor Ahn	Russia	41.063	QA
2	2	Liang Wenhao	China	41.221	QA
3	2	Sjinkie Knegt	Netherlands	41.290	QB
4	2	Jon Eley	Great Britain	41.441	QB

=== Finals ===
==== Final B (Classification Round) ====
Rank	Name	Country	Time	Notes
5	Han Tianyu	China	41.534	
6	J. R. Celski	United States	41.786	
7	Jon Eley	Great Britain	41.870	
8	Sjinkie Knegt	Netherlands	42.608	

==== Final A (Medal Round) ====
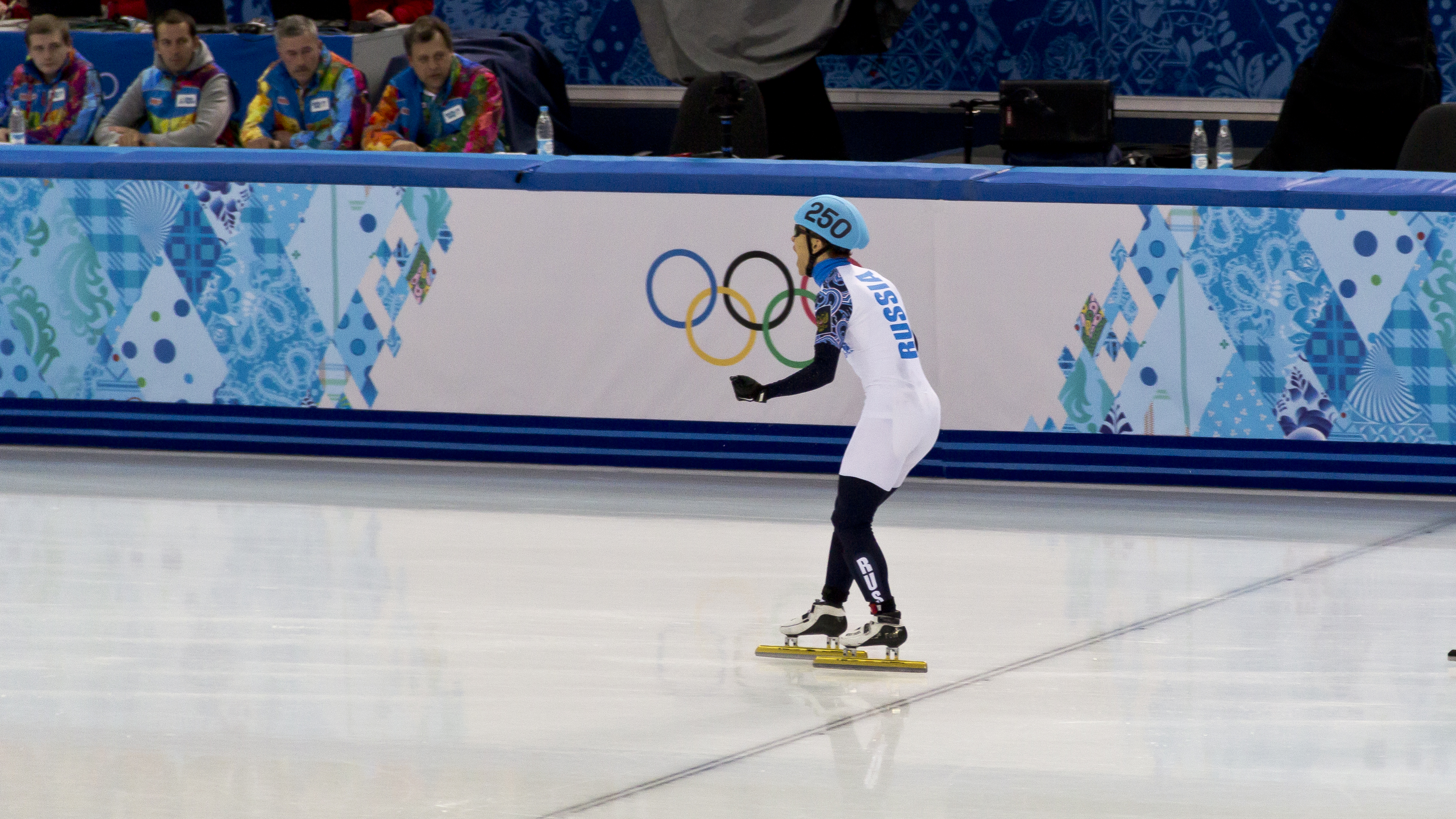
Viktor Ahn

Rank	Name	Country	Time	Notes
1st place, gold medalist(s)	Viktor Ahn	Russia	41.312	
2nd place, silver medalist(s)	Wu Dajing	China	41.516	
3rd place, bronze medalist(s)	Charle Cournoyer	Canada	41.617	
4	Liang Wenhao	China	1:13.590	
