= Malaysia at the 2017 Asian Winter Games =

- IOC code: MAS
- NOC: Olympic Council of Malaysia
- Website: www.olympic.org.my (in English)

in Sapporo and Obihiro February 19–26
- Competitors: 36 in 3 sports
- Flag bearer: Reezman Bin Isa(Opening Ceremony)
- Medals: Gold 0 Silver 0 Bronze 0 Total 0

Asian Winter Games appearances
- 2007; 2011; 2017; 2025; 2029

Malaysia participated in the 2017 Asian Winter Games in Sapporo and Obihiro, Japan from February 19 to 26. The country is scheduled to compete with thirty-six athletes in three sports (four disciplines).

== Competitors ==
The following table lists the Malaysian delegation per sport and gender.

Sport	Men	Women	Total
Alpine skiing	2	0	2
Figure skating	2	2	4
Ice hockey	22	0	22
Short track speed skating	3	5	8
Total	29	7	36

== Alpine skiing ==
Malaysia is scheduled to compete in alpine skiing for the first time at the Asian Winter Games. The team consists of two male athletes.

Men

Athlete	Event			
Athlete	Event	Run 1	Run 2	Rank
Othman Mirzan	Giant slalom	1:25.66	1:25.34	24
Othman Mirzan	Slalom	(Did not participate)		
Jeffrey Webb	Giant slalom	1:18.24	1:17.75	15
Jeffrey Webb	Slalom	52.93	56.80	10

== Figure skating ==
Malaysia is scheduled to compete in the figure skating competitions.

Men's single

Athlete(s)	Event	SP		FS		Total	
Athlete(s)	Event	Points	Rank	Points	Rank	Points	Rank
Julian Yee	Singles	72.75	10	149.94	8	222.69	8
Chew Kai Xiang	Singles	58.86	12	109.56	14	168.42	14

Women's single

Athlete(s)	Event	SP		FS		Total	
Athlete(s)	Event	Points	Rank	Points	Rank	Points	Rank
Aina Sorfina Aminudin	Singles	25.16	16	57.19	14	82.35	16
Aneeta Lingam	Singles	18.67	21	44.15	21	62.82	22

== Ice hockey ==
Malaysia has entered a men's hockey team. The team will compete in division two. Malaysia finished in fifth place (15th place overall) in division 2 of the competition.

=== Men's tournament ===
Malaysia was represented by the following 22 athletes:

- Lee Thien-ian (G)
- Shahrul Shukor (G)
- Azlly Tengku (G)
- Hariz Mohammad (D)
- Hisham Mohammad (D)
- Moi Jia-yung (D)
- Azman Muhammad (D)
- Shaharudin Muhammad (D)
- Bin Reezman (D)
- Yap Eu-jin (D)
- Aqfar Abulais (F)
- Darshen Chelliah (F)
- Aiman Fadzul (F)
- Khoo Seng-chee (F)
- Bryan Lim (F)
- Loke Ban-kin (F)
- Low Jun-ming (F)
- Anjam Mohd (F)
- Brandon Tan (F)
- Stephen Santhanasamy (F)
- Syed Shahabuddin (F)
- Yow Cheong-jun (F)

Legend: G = Goalie, D = Defense, F = Forward

Group B

Rank	Team	Pld	W	OW	OL	L	GF	GA	GD	Pts
1	Turkmenistan	3	3	0	0	0	37	4	+33	9
2	Macau	3	2	0	0	1	15	22	–7	6
3	Malaysia	3	1	0	0	2	19	20	–1	3
4	Indonesia	3	0	0	0	3	6	31	–25	0

18 February 2017; 13:00	Turkmenistan	9–2 (5–0, 4–1, 0–1)	Malaysia	Hoshioki Ice Skating Rink; Attendance: 113

Game reference
			Referee: (Sweden) Richard Magnusson; Linesmen: (Poland) Rafal Noworyta (Norway) Daniel Haugen
8 min	Penalties	4 min	Referee: (Sweden) Richard Magnusson; Linesmen: (Poland) Rafal Noworyta (Norway) Daniel Haugen
50	Shots	14	Referee: (Sweden) Richard Magnusson; Linesmen: (Poland) Rafal Noworyta (Norway) Daniel Haugen

21 February 2017; 13:00	Malaysia	13–2 (6–1, 3–1, 4–0)	Indonesia	Hoshioki Ice Skating Rink; Attendance: 146

Game reference
47 min	Penalties	26 min
40	Shots	12

24 February 2017; 9:30	Malaysia	4–9 (1–2, 2–4, 2–3)	Macau	Hoshioki Ice Skating Rink; Attendance: 110

Game reference
50 min	Penalties	16 min
40	Shots	24

== Short track speed skating ==
Malaysia is scheduled to compete in Short track speed skating for the first time at the Asian Winter Games.

Men

Athlete	Event	Heat		Quarterfinal		Semifinal		Final	
Athlete	Event	Time	Rank	Time	Rank	Time	Rank	Time	Rank
Ariff Rasydan Fadzli	500 m	47.083	4	did not advance					
Hazim Syahmi Shahrum	500 m	47.990	4	did not advance					
Hazim Syahmi Shahrum	1000 m	1:40.704	5	did not advance					
Hazim Syahmi Shahrum	1500 m	2:34.392	4	did not advance					
Wong De Vin	500 m	46.352	4	did not advance					
Wong De Vin	1000 m	1:39.925	3	did not advance					
Khairil Ridhwan Khalil	1000 m	1:44.021	4	did not advance					
Khairil Ridhwan Khalil	1500 m	2:40.971	4	did not advance					
Vincent Chan	1500 m	2:59.788	5	did not advance					
Wong De Vin; Khairil Ridhwan Khalil; Vincent Chan; Hazim Syahmi Shahrum	5000 m relay	8:01.319	3 Q	—		8:01.032	2 FA	8:13.362	4

Women

Athlete	Event	Heat		Quarterfinal		Semifinal		Final	
Athlete	Event	Time	Rank	Time	Rank	Time	Rank	Time	Rank
Ashley Chin	500 m	1:11.252	4	did not advance					
Ashley Chin	1000 m	2:00.641	3	did not advance					
Ashley Chin	1500 m	3:02.460	3 Q	2:56.844	5	did not advance			
Nor Marissa Alia	500 m	55.653	3	did not advance					
Nor Marissa Alia	1000 m	2:07.488	4	did not advance					
Anja Chong	500 m	48.357	2 Q	47.473	4	did not advance			
Anja Chong	1000 m	1:48.243	2 Q	1:39.869	4	did not advance			
