= Josh Cheetham =

British speed skater (born 1992)

Personal information
- Full name: Joshua Luke Cheetham
- Nationality: British
- Born: 26 October 1992 (age 33) Nottingham, England
- Height: 170 cm (5 ft 7 in)
- Weight: 64 kg (141 lb)

Sport
- Country: Great Britain
- Sport: Short track speed skating

Joshua Luke Cheetham (born 26 October 1992) is a British short track speed skater. He competed in the 2018 Winter Olympics.
