= Thailand at the 2017 Asian Winter Games =

- IOC code: THA
- NOC: National Olympic Committee of Thailand

in Sapporo and Obihiro February 19–26
- Competitors: 51 in 3 sports
- Flag bearer: Thita Lamsam
- Medals: Gold 0 Silver 0 Bronze 0 Total 0

Asian Winter Games appearances
- 1996; 1999; 2003; 2007; 2011; 2017; 2025; 2029

Thailand is scheduled to compete in the 2017 Asian Winter Games in Sapporo and Obihiro, Japan from February 19 to 26.

Thailand is scheduled to compete in three sports (seven disciplines). The team consisted of 55 athletes, which marks the most the country has sent to the Asian Winter Games.

== Competitors ==
The following table lists the Thai delegation per sport and gender.

Sport	Men	Women	Total
Alpine skiing	1	0	1
Cross-country skiing	1	1	2
Figure skating	0	2	2
Freestyle skiing	1	0	1
Ice hockey	22	20	42
Short track speed skating	3	0	3
Speed skating	0	1	1
Total	27	24	51

- The same athlete will compete in both alpine and freestyle skiing.

== Alpine skiing ==
Thailand competed in the alpine skiing competition with one male athlete. Robert-Worachai Pinsent will also compete in freestyle skiing.

Men

Athlete	Event	Run 1		Run 2		Total	
Athlete	Event	Time	Rank	Time	Rank	Time	Rank
Robert-Worachai Pinsent	Giant slalom	1:19.25	22	DNF			
Robert-Worachai Pinsent	Slalom	57.34	14	1:06.33	17	2:03.67	15

== Cross-country skiing ==
Thailand entered two athletes, however their results did not count at the time for unknown reasons.

Men

- Mark Chanloung

Women

- Karen Chanloung

== Figure skating ==
Thailand entered two female figure skaters in the ladies individual competition.

Individual

Athlete(s)	Event	SP		FP		Total	
Athlete(s)	Event	Points	Rank	Points	Rank	Points	Rank
Thita Lamsam	Ladies	26.89	15	53.12	18	80.01	17
Promsan Rattanadilok na Phuket	Ladies	25.71	16	62.84	14	88.55	14

== Freestyle skiing ==
Thailand will compete in the freestyle skiing competition with one male athlete. Robert-Worachai Pinsent will also compete in alpine skiing.

Men

- Robert-Worachai Pinsent

== Ice hockey ==
Thailand has entered teams in both hockey tournaments. The men's team will compete in division one. Thailand's men's team finished in first place (5th place overall) in division 1 of the competition.

=== Men's tournament ===
Thailand was represented by the following 18 athletes:

- Prawes Kaewjeen (G)
- Prakpoom Thongaram (G)
- Ungkulpattanasuk Pattarapol (G)
- Nattapong Harnnarujchai (D)
- Anun Kullugin (D)
- Chanchit Supadilokluk (D)
- Tanapon Andreas Helgesen (D)
- Edvin Ken Kindborn (D)
- Papan Thanakroekkiat (D)
- Likit Neimwan (D)
- Voravith Maklamthong (D)
- Rakchai Sukwiboon (F)
- Tewin Chartsuwan (F)
- Panithi Nawasmittawong (F)
- Weerachai Prasertsri (F)
- Teerasak Rattanachot (F)
- Jantaphong Tengsakul (F)
- Juhani Kim Aarola (F)
- Chanchieo Supadilokluk (F)
- Rattharut Surasirirattanasin (F)
- Peravit Kovitaya (F)
- Masato Kitayama (F)

Legend

- G– Goalie D = Defense F = Forward

Rank	Team	Pld	W	OW	OL	L	GF	GA	GD	Pts
5	Thailand	5	4	1	0	0	36	12	+24	14
6	Chinese Taipei	5	3	1	1	0	34	13	+21	12
7	United Arab Emirates	5	3	0	0	2	29	24	+5	9
8	Mongolia	5	2	0	0	3	25	23	+2	6
9	Hong Kong	5	1	0	1	3	27	27	0	4
10	Singapore	5	0	0	0	5	4	56	–52	0

18 February 2017; 19:00	Thailand	5–4 (1–1, 3–1, 1–2)	Mongolia	Mikaho Gymnasium; Attendance: 200

Game reference
			Referee: (South Korea) Chang Sung-kuk; Linesmen: (Japan) Sawayama Naoki (Switzerland) Dominik Altmann
14 min	Penalties	18 min	Referee: (South Korea) Chang Sung-kuk; Linesmen: (Japan) Sawayama Naoki (Switzerland) Dominik Altmann
43	Shots	27	Referee: (South Korea) Chang Sung-kuk; Linesmen: (Japan) Sawayama Naoki (Switzerland) Dominik Altmann

20 February 2017; 12:00	United Arab Emirates	4–6 (0–1, 1–2, 3–3)	Thailand	Mikaho Gymnasium; Attendance: 450

Game reference
24 min	Penalties	6 min
19	Shots	52

21 February 2017; 15:30	Hong Kong	2–8 (1–3, 1–2, 0–3)	Thailand	Mikaho Gymnasium; Attendance: 270

Game reference
22 min	Penalties	14 min
31	Shots	43

23 February 2017; 12:00	Chinese Taipei	2–3 (1–0, 0–0, 1–2, 0–1)	Thailand	Mikaho Gymnasium; Attendance: 500

Game reference
6 min	Penalties	6 min
40	Shots	50

25 February 2017; 15:30	Thailand	14–0 (5–0, 5–0, 4–0)	Singapore	Mikaho Gymnasium; Attendance: 250

Game reference
4 min	Penalties	2 min
50	Shots	13

=== Women's tournament ===
Thailand was represented by the following 20 athletes:

- Wasunun Angkulpattanasuk (G)
- Wichaya Phangnga (G)
- Sirikarn Jittresin (D)
- Siriluck Kaewkitinarong (D)
- Pimnapa Pungpapong (D)
- Nion Putsuk (D)
- Jaravee Srichamnong (D)
- Varachanant Boonyubol (F)
- Kwanchanok Choeiklang (F)
- Siriwan Kaewkitinarong (F)
- Pawadee Keratichewanun (F)
- Nuchanat Ponglerkdee (F)
- Kritsana Promdirat (F)
- Wirasinee Rattananai (F)
- Pijittra Jear Sae (F)
- Rungrawee Sakulsurarat (F)
- Fongfon Sukontanit (F)
- Panvipa Suksirivecharuk (F)
- Thanravee Surasirirattanasin (F)
- Minsasha Teekhathanasakul (F)

Legend: G = Goalie, D = Defense, F = Forward

Rank	Team	Pld	W	OW	OL	L	GF	GA	GD	Pts
1st place, gold medalist(s)	Japan	5	5	0	0	0	98	1	+97	15
2nd place, silver medalist(s)	China	5	3	0	1	1	46	12	+34	10
3rd place, bronze medalist(s)	Kazakhstan	5	3	0	0	2	31	14	+17	9
4	South Korea	5	2	1	0	2	37	6	+31	8
5	Thailand	5	1	0	0	4	5	84	–79	3
6	Hong Kong	5	0	0	0	5	4	104	–100	0

18 February 2017; 15:30	Thailand	0–20 (0–7, 0–7, 0–6)	South Korea	Tsukisamu Gymnasium; Attendance: 360

Game reference
			Referee: (United Kingdom) Deana Cuglietta; Linesmen: (Norway) Anette Fjeldstad (Switzerland) Cindy Naef
4 min	Penalties	4 min	Referee: (United Kingdom) Deana Cuglietta; Linesmen: (Norway) Anette Fjeldstad (Switzerland) Cindy Naef
1	Shots	108	Referee: (United Kingdom) Deana Cuglietta; Linesmen: (Norway) Anette Fjeldstad (Switzerland) Cindy Naef

20 February 2017; 12:00	Hong Kong	4–5 (2–2, 1–1, 1–2)	Thailand	Tsukisamu Gymnasium; Attendance: 261

Game reference
6 min	Penalties	4 min
28	Shots	30

21 February 2017; 12:00	China	15–0 (7–0, 4–0, 4–0)	Thailand	Tsukisamu Gymnasium; Attendance: 184

Game reference
2 min	Penalties	4 min
74	Shots	3

23 February 2017; 19:00	Thailand	0–37 (0–18, 0–13, 0–6)	Japan	Tsukisamu Gymnasium; Attendance: 348

Game reference
10 min	Penalties	0 min
0	Shots	150

25 February 2017; 12:00	Kazakhstan	8–0 (5–0, 2–0, 1–0)	Thailand	Tsukisamu Gymnasium; Attendance: 337

Game reference
0 min	Penalties	6 min
75	Shots	0

== Short track speed skating ==
Thailand's short track speed skating team consisted of three male athletes.

Men

- Teerasak Boonpok
- Prakit Bovornmongkolsak
- Atip Navarat

== Speed skating ==
Thailand's speed skating team consisted of one female athlete.

Woman

Athlete	Event	Final		
Athlete	Event	Points	Time	Rank
Bertha Natalie Hognestad	500 m	—N/a	48.26	17
Bertha Natalie Hognestad	1000 m	—N/a	1:37.74	18
Bertha Natalie Hognestad	Mass start	0	2:34.4	10
