= Ren Ziwei =

Chinese short track speed skater (born 1997)

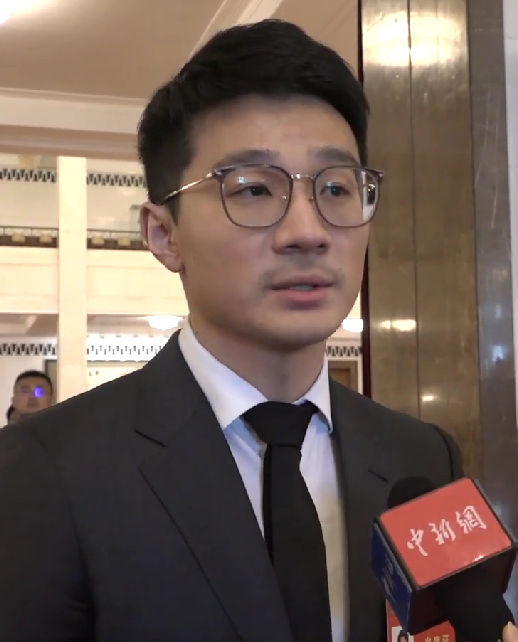
- Ren in 2024

Personal information
- Nationality: Chinese
- Born: 3 June 1997 (age 29) Harbin, Heilongjiang, China
- Height: 1.77 m (5 ft 10 in)
- Weight: 73 kg (161 lb)

Sport
- Country: China
- Sport: Short track speed skating
- Event: 500 m
- Club: Harbin Winter Sports Training Centre

Achievements and titles
- Personal best(s): 1000m: 1:26.512 (2014); 1500m: 2:19.946 (2014)
Medal record
Olympic Games
Gold medal – first place	2022 Beijing	1000 m
Gold medal – first place	2022 Beijing	2000 m mixed relay
Silver medal – second place	2018 Pyeongchang	5000 m relay
World Championships
Silver medal – second place	2017 Rotterdam	5000 m relay
Silver medal – second place	2018 Montreal	500 m
Silver medal – second place	2019 Sofia	5000 m relay
Bronze medal – third place	2019 Sofia	500 m
Asian Winter Games
Gold medal – first place	2017 Sapporo	5000 m relay
World Junior Championships
Gold medal – first place	2014 Erzurum	3000 m relay
Bronze medal – third place	2014 Erzurum	1500 m
Gold medal – first place	2016 Sofia	1000 m
Silver medal – second place	2016 Sofia	1500 m
Gold medal – first place	2016 Sofia	3000 m relay
Gold medal – first place	2016 Sofia	Overall

Ren Ziwei
- Chinese: 任子威
Transcriptions
Standard Mandarin
- Hanyu Pinyin: Rén Zǐwēi
- IPA: [ɻə̌n tsɹ̩̀ wéɪ]

Ren Ziwei (born 3 June 1997) is a Chinese short track speed-skater.

== Career ==
He won a bronze medal in men's 1500 meters in 2014 World Junior Championships in Erzurum, Turkey. With his three teammates Chen Guang, Xu Fu and Sui Xin, he had also won the gold medal in men's 3000 meter relay race. Ren competed in the 2022 Beijing Winter Olympics, and won gold in the men's 1000 meters, while his compatriot Li Wenlong took the silver. Ren and Li had actually finished 2nd and 3rd behind Hungary's Shaolin Sándor Liu, who was disqualified for a lane violation and an arm block on Ren at the finish. Ren along with his teammates Wu Dajing, Qu Chunyu and Fan Kexin, had also won the gold medal in the 2000 meters mixed relay event.

== ISU World Cup Medals ==
Season	Location	Rank	Event
2021–22	(Japan) Nagoya	1st place, gold medalist(s)	1000m
2021–22	(Netherlands) Dordrecht	1st place, gold medalist(s)	1500m
2021–22	(Hungary) Debrecen	1st place, gold medalist(s)	1500m
2019-20	(Germany) Dresden	1st place, gold medalist(s)	1500m
2015–16	(China) Shanghai	1st place, gold medalist(s)	1500m
2019–20	(Japan) Nagoya	1st place, gold medalist(s)	5000m Relay
2016–17	(United States) Salt Lake City	1st place, gold medalist(s)	5000m Relay
2016–17	(China) Shanghai	1st place, gold medalist(s)	5000m Relay
2021–22	(Netherlands) Dordrecht	1st place, gold medalist(s)	Mixed 2000m Relay
2021–22	(Hungary) Debrecen	1st place, gold medalist(s)	Mixed 2000m Relay
2021–22	(China) Beijing	1st place, gold medalist(s)	Mixed 2000m Relay
2019-20	(Canada) Montreal	1st place, gold medalist(s)	Mixed 2000m Relay
2018-19	(Canada) Calgary	1st place, gold medalist(s)	Mixed 2000m Relay
2021–22	(Japan) Nagoya	2nd place, silver medalist(s)	500m
2018-19	(United States) Salt Lake City	2nd place, silver medalist(s)	1000m
2021–22	(Japan) Nagoya	2nd place, silver medalist(s)	5000m Relay
2018-19	(United States) Salt Lake City	2nd place, silver medalist(s)	5000m Relay
2017-18	(Hungary) Budapest	2nd place, silver medalist(s)	5000m Relay
2021–22	(Japan) Nagoya	2nd place, silver medalist(s)	Mixed 2000m Relay
2021–22	(Hungary) Debrecen	3rd place, bronze medalist(s)	500m
2019–20	(Netherlands) Dordrecht	3rd place, bronze medalist(s)	1500m
2018–19	(Canada) Calgary	3rd place, bronze medalist(s)	1000m
2017–18	(Netherlands) Dordrecht	3rd place, bronze medalist(s)	5000m Relay
