= Hong Kong at the 2017 Asian Winter Games =

- IOC code: HKG
- NOC: Sports Federation and Olympic Committee of Hong Kong, China

in Sapporo and Obihiro February 19–26
- Competitors: 50 in 2 sports
- Flag bearer: Tony Leung (Opening Ceremony) MA Maisy Hiu Ching (Closing Ceremony)
- Medals: Gold 0 Silver 0 Bronze 0 Total 0

Asian Winter Games appearances
- 1986; 1990; 1996; 1999; 2003; 2007; 2011; 2017; 2025; 2029

Hong Kong competed in the 2017 Asian Winter Games in Sapporo and Obihiro, Japan from February 19 to 26. The country competed in two sports (three disciplines).

Hong Kong's team consisted of 50 athletes, the largest team the nation has sent to the Asian Winter Games. These games also marked the country's debut in the women's ice hockey competition. The team also consists of 28 officials.

Ice hockey player Tony Leung was the country's flagbearer during the parade of nations at the opening ceremony.

== Competitors ==
The following table lists the Hong Kong delegation per sport and gender.

Sport	Men	Women	Total
Figure skating	2	2	4
Ice hockey	23	21	44
Short track speed skating	2	0	2
Total	27	23	50

== Figure skating ==
Hong Kong competed in the figure skating competitions. The team consisted of four athletes.

Men

- Leung Kwun-hung
- Harry Lee

Women

- Maisy Ma
- Joanna So

== Ice hockey ==
Hong Kong has entered a men's and women's hockey team. The men's team will compete in division one. Hong Kong's men's team finished in fifth place (9th place overall) in division 1 of the competition.

=== Men's tournament ===
Hong Kong was represented by the following 23 athletes:

- Cheung Ching-ho (G)
- Ho King-chi (G)
- Emerson Keung (G)
- Lam Chi-kin (D)
- Tony Leung (D)
- Julian Ma (D)
- Wong Ka-ho (D)
- Theophilus Wong (D)
- Yannick Wong (D)
- Yeung Chun-ying (D)
- Howard Yuen (D)
- Justin Cheng (F)
- Terence Chim (F)
- Terry Choi (F)
- John Fu (F)
- Bernard Fung (F)
- Kan Siu-him (F)
- Lau Chi-lok (F)
- Linus Lo (F)
- Herman Lui (F)
- Alvin Sham (F)
- Jasper Tang (F)
- To Hei-yu (F)

Legend

- G– Goalie D = Defense F = Forward

Rank	Team	Pld	W	OW	OL	L	GF	GA	GD	Pts
5	Thailand	5	4	1	0	0	36	12	+24	14
6	Chinese Taipei	5	3	1	1	0	34	13	+21	12
7	United Arab Emirates	5	3	0	0	2	29	24	+5	9
8	Mongolia	5	2	0	0	3	25	23	+2	6
9	Hong Kong	5	1	0	1	3	27	27	0	4
10	Singapore	5	0	0	0	5	4	56	–52	0

18 February 2017; 12:00	Singapore	1–12 (0–2, 1–5, 0–5)	Hong Kong	Mikaho Gymnasium; Attendance: 260

Game reference
			Referee: (Germany) Benjamin Hoppe; Linesmen: (Austria) Maximilian Gatol (South Korea) Park Jun-soo
12 min	Penalties	4 min	Referee: (Germany) Benjamin Hoppe; Linesmen: (Austria) Maximilian Gatol (South Korea) Park Jun-soo
16	Shots	45	Referee: (Germany) Benjamin Hoppe; Linesmen: (Austria) Maximilian Gatol (South Korea) Park Jun-soo

20 February 2017; 19:00	Hong Kong	4–5 (3–0, 0–3, 1–1, 0–0, 0–1)	Chinese Taipei	Mikaho Gymnasium; Attendance: 180

Game reference
28 min	Penalties	14 min
19	Shots	39

21 February 2017; 15:30	Hong Kong	2–8 (1–3, 1–2, 0–3)	Thailand	Mikaho Gymnasium; Attendance: 270

Game reference
22 min	Penalties	14 min
31	Shots	43

23 February 2017; 15:30	Mongolia	8–6 (6–2, 1–2, 1–2)	Hong Kong	Mikaho Gymnasium; Attendance: 280

Game reference
8 min	Penalties	36 min
38	Shots	30

25 February 2017; 19:00	Hong Kong	3–5 (1–0, 1–2, 1–3)	United Arab Emirates	Mikaho Gymnasium; Attendance: 180

Game reference
10 min	Penalties	8 min
30	Shots	25

=== Women's tournament ===
Hong Kong made its debut in the women's ice hockey competition. Hong Kong was represented by the following 21 athletes:

- Chau Nga-sze (G)
- Virginia Wong (G)
- Chloe Chan (D)
- Kwan Yim-kuen (D)
- Kwok Hoi-kei (D)
- Aman Leung (D)
- Adrienne Li (D)
- Joey Lin (D)
- Brittany Ng (D)
- Monica Shum (D)
- Maureen Wong (D)
- Queenie Chan (F)
- Joanna Chan (F)
- Cheung Oi-lam (F)
- Chow Suet-yee (F)
- Chow Wai-yee (F)
- Cindy Chu (F)
- Claudia Ieong (F)
- Lau Yeuk-ting (F)
- Wong Tsui-yi (F)
- Jacqueline Ng (F)
- Legend: G = Goalie, D = Defense, F = Forward

Rank	Team	Pld	W	OW	OL	L	GF	GA	GD	Pts
1st place, gold medalist(s)	Japan	5	5	0	0	0	98	1	+97	15
2nd place, silver medalist(s)	China	5	3	0	1	1	46	12	+34	10
3rd place, bronze medalist(s)	Kazakhstan	5	3	0	0	2	31	14	+17	9
4	South Korea	5	2	1	0	2	37	6	+31	8
5	Thailand	5	1	0	0	4	5	84	–79	3
6	Hong Kong	5	0	0	0	5	4	104	–100	0

18 February 2017; 19:00	China	20–0 (4–0, 8–0, 8–0)	Hong Kong	Tsukisamu Gymnasium; Attendance: 110

Game reference
			Referee: (Japan) Kuroda Anna; Linesmen: (Japan) Mizuhori Mai (South Korea) Lee Kyung-sun
6 min	Penalties	2 min	Referee: (Japan) Kuroda Anna; Linesmen: (Japan) Mizuhori Mai (South Korea) Lee Kyung-sun
78	Shots	3	Referee: (Japan) Kuroda Anna; Linesmen: (Japan) Mizuhori Mai (South Korea) Lee Kyung-sun

20 February 2017; 12:00	Hong Kong	4–5 (2–2, 1–1, 1–2)	Thailand	Tsukisamu Gymnasium; Attendance: 261

Game reference
6 min	Penalties	4 min
28	Shots	30

21 February 2017; 19:00	Japan	46–0 (17–0, 18–0, 11–0)	Hong Kong	Tsukisamu Gymnasium; Attendance: 513

Game reference
0 min	Penalties	2 min
158	Shots	0

23 February 2017; 15:30	Hong Kong	0–19 (0–7, 0–5, 0–7)	Kazakhstan	Tsukisamu Gymnasium; Attendance: 182

Game reference
0 min	Penalties	8 min
2	Shots	72

25 February 2017; 15:30	South Korea	14–0 (9–0, 5–0, 0–0)	Hong Kong	Tsukisamu Gymnasium; Attendance: 508

Game reference
6 min	Penalties	4 min
59	Shots	0

== Short track speed skating ==
Hong Kong is scheduled to compete in Short track speed skating. The team consists of two athletes.

Men

- Sidney Chu
- Kelvin Tsang
