= 2017 Asian Winter Games medal table =

2017 Asian Winter Games medals
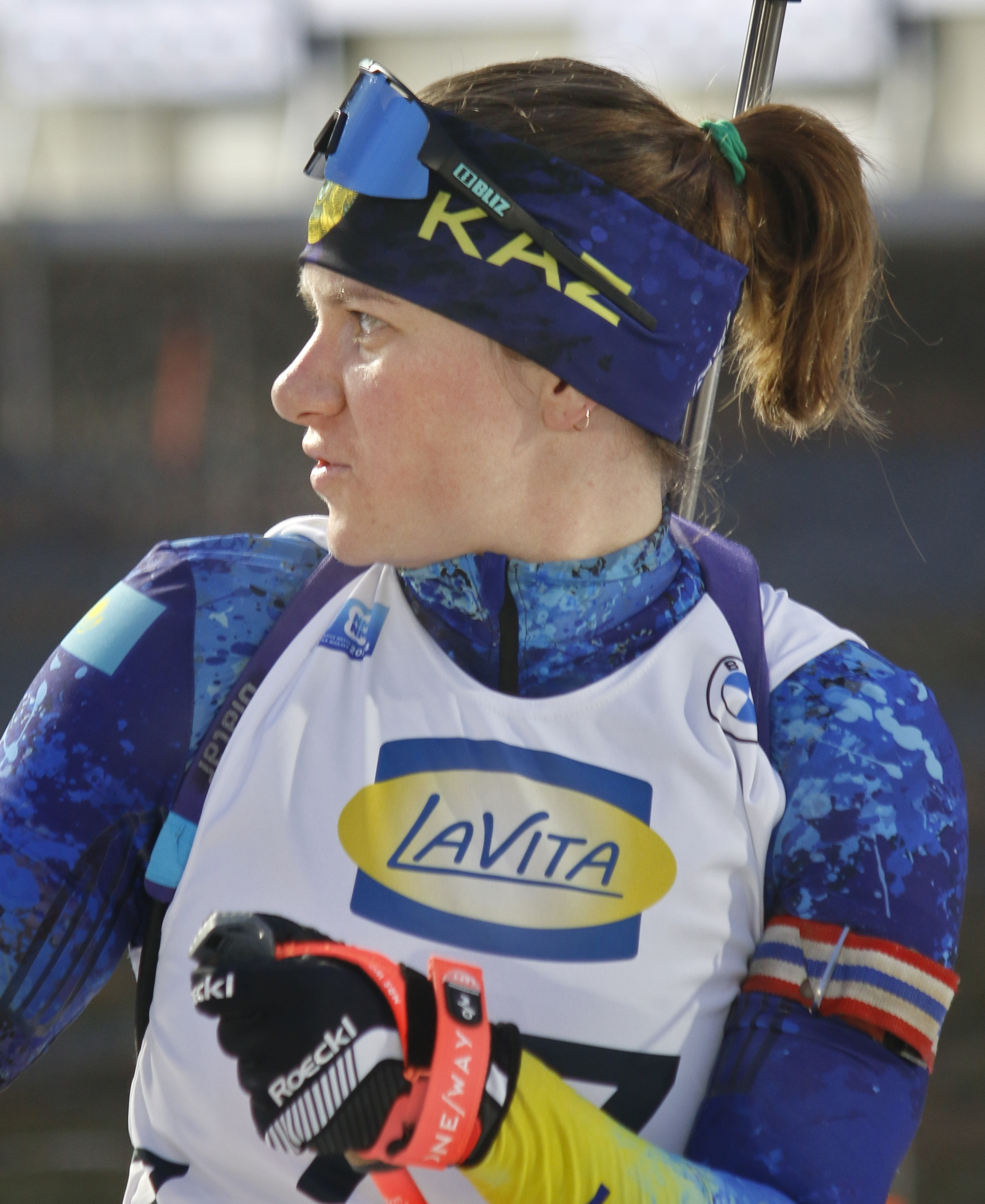
- Galina Vishnevskaya of Kazakhstan (pictured in 2024) tied for the most gold medals and most overall medals at the 2017 Asian Winter Games, winning four gold medals in the biathlon.
- Location: Sapporo, Japan

Highlights
- Most gold medals: Japan (27)
- Most total medals: Japan (74)
- Medaling NOCs: 5

The 2017 Asian Winter Games, officially known as the 8th Asian Winter Games, were an international multi-sport event held in Sapporo, Japan, from 19 to 26 February 2017, with some preliminary events in curling and ice hockey beginning the day before the 19th. The games were originally scheduled for 2015 but were moved to the year before the 2018 Winter Olympics. A total of 1,147 athletes representing 32 National Olympic Committees (NOCs) participated, surpassing the previous record high of 26 NOCs set at the previous games in Astana and Almaty, Kazakhstan. Indonesia, Sri Lanka, Timor-Leste, Turkmenistan and Vietnam made their Asian Winter Games debut, with Australia and New Zealand competing as guest competitors, and therefore ineligible to win medals. The games featured 64 events in 11 sports, with bandy and ski orienteering being removed.

Overall, athletes representing five NOCs won at least one medal, and four NOCs won at least one gold medal. Host nation Japan won the most gold and the most overall medals, with 27 and 74 respectively. Biathlete Galina Vishnevskaya of Kazakhstan, cross-country skier Yuki Kobayashi of Japan, and speed skater Lee Seung-hoon of South Korea tied for the most gold medals won by an individual at the games, with four each. Alongside them, biathlete Yan Savitskiy of Kazakhstan, cross-country skier Akira Lenting of Japan, short track speed skater Choi Min-jeong of South Korea, and speed skaters Miho Takagi of Japan and Kim Bo-reum of South Korea, tied for the most overall medals won by an individual at the games, with four each.

== Medals ==
The medal design was revealed on 21 December 2016. The medals were cut using diamonds and the three stars on them are curved to look like ice. The three stars are meant to represent athletes as "Stars of Hope", while the surface of the medal represents the fresh air in the winter along with snow and ice seen across Hokkaido. The medals are 55 millimetres (2.2 in) in diameter and 4.5 millimetres (0.18 in) thick. The three kind of medals also weigh differently, with the gold weighing the most at 109.1 grams (3.85 oz), followed by silver at 107.1 grams (3.78 oz) and finally bronze at 87.9 grams (3.10 oz).

== Medal table ==
The medal table is based on information provided by the Olympic Council of Asia and is consistent with conventional International Olympic Committee sorting in its published medal tables. The table uses the Olympic medal table sorting method. By default, the table is ordered by the number of gold medals the athletes from a nation won, where a nation is an entity represented by a NOC. The number of silver medals is taken into consideration next and then the number of bronze medals. If teams are still tied, equal ranking is given and they are listed alphabetically.

* Host nation (Japan)

2017 Asian Winter Games medal table
Rank	Nation	Gold	Silver	Bronze	Total
1	Japan*	27	21	26	74
2	South Korea	16	18	16	50
3	China	12	14	9	35
4	Kazakhstan	9	11	12	32
5	North Korea	0	0	1	1
Totals (5 entries)		64	64	64	192
