= Andy Jung (speed skater) =

Australian short track speed skater

Personal information
- National team: Australia
- Born: Jung Hyun-Woo; 24 April 1997 (age 29) South Korea
- Height: 177 cm (5 ft 10 in)
- Weight: 70 kg (154 lb)

Sport
- Sport: Short track speed skating
- Coached by: Jae-Su Chun (personal); Lachlan Hay (national)

Jung Hyun-Woo (Korean: 현우정, born 24 April 1997), known professionally as Andy Jung, is a South Korean-born professional short track speed skating athlete residing in Melbourne, Victoria. Jung represented Australia at the 2018 Winter Olympics, where he competed in the Men's 1500m event as well as the Men's 500 metres.

== Career ==
In the Men's 1500m event at the 2018 Winter Olympics, his first competition at the Olympic games, he finished in fourth place behind Canada's Charles Hamelin, Belgium's Jens Almey, and the United States' Aaron Tran. Both Jung and China's Han Tianyu, who placed fifth, advanced to the semifinal despite the top three quota due to the disqualification of Italy's Yuri Confortola, who collided with Tianyu during the race. The judges awarded a semifinal berth to Jung after the judges ruled that Jung was impeded by the collision. In the first semifinal of the event, Jung finished fifth behind Russia's Semion Elistratov, Hamelin, Korea's Seo Yira and Latvia's Roberto Puķītis. The top two placers, Elistratov and Hamelin qualified for the gold medal race and the third and fourth placers, Yira and Puķītis, qualified for the ranking final, while Jung failed to advance.

He also competed in the men's 500 metres at the 2018 Pyeongchang Olympics, where he slipped because of the American athlete, Aaron Tran, who pushed Andy's blade. Aaron ended up receiving penalty, but unfortunately Andy came third and could not proceed to the next game.

== Statistics ==
=== International competitions ===
Year	Competition	Venue	Event	Position	Time
2018	Winter Olympic Games	Pyeongchang, South Korea	Men's 1500m – Heat 2	4th (Note: Jung and China's Han Tianyu advanced to the semifinals after Italy's Yuri Confortola was penalised.)	2:16.995
2018	Winter Olympic Games	Pyeongchang, South Korea	Men's 1500m – Semifinal 1	5th	2:11.183

== See also ==
- List of Australian Winter Olympians
