= New Zealand at the 2017 Asian Winter Games =

- IOC code: NZL
- NOC: New Zealand Olympic Committee

in Sapporo and Obihiro 19–26 February
- Competitors: 3 in 1 sport
- Flag bearer: Volunteer(Closing Ceremony)
- Medals: Gold 0 Silver 0 Bronze 0 Total 0

Asian Winter Games appearances
- 2017; 2025; 2029

New Zealand competed in the 2017 Asian Winter Games in Sapporo and Obihiro, Japan from 19 to 26 February. This marked the debut of the country at the Asian Winter Games, however New Zealand athletes were not eligible to win any medals, as they were classified as guest competitors.

New Zealand competed in one sport (two disciplines) and the team consisted of three male athletes.

== Competitors ==
The following table lists the Chinese delegation per sport and gender.

| Sport | Men | Women | Total |
|---|---|---|---|
| Short track speed skating | 2 | 0 | 2 |
| Speed skating | 1 | 0 | 1 |
| Total | 3 | 0 | 3 |

== Speed skating ==
New Zealand's speed skating team consisted of one male athlete.

Man

| Athlete | Event | Final | |
| Athlete | Event | Time | Rank |
|---|---|---|---|
| Sasha Faris | 500 m | 42.12 | 20 |
| Sasha Faris | 1000 m | 1:24.24 | 21 |
| Sasha Faris | 1500 m | 2:11.03 | 20 |
