= North Korea at the 2017 Asian Winter Games =

- IOC code: PRK
- NOC: Olympic Committee of the Democratic People's Republic of Korea

in Sapporo and Obihiro February 19–26
- Competitors: 7 in 2 sports
- Flag bearers: Kim Pyol-song (opening); Kim Ju-sik (closing)
- Medals Ranked 5th: Gold 0 Silver 0 Bronze 1 Total 1

Asian Winter Games appearances
- 1986; 1990; 1996–1999; 2003; 2007; 2011; 2017; 2025; 2029

The Democratic People's Republic of Korea (North Korea) competed in the 2017 Asian Winter Games in Sapporo and Obihiro, Japan from February 19 to 26. The country competed in one sport (skating) and two disciplines: figure skating and short track speed skating. The North Korean team consisted of seven athletes.

North Korea finished the games with one medal, a bronze in the pairs figure skating competition. This was exactly the same result the country achieved at the last games in 2011.

== Background ==
North Korea is scheduled to return to competition after missing the last edition of the games in 2011. The country had to request special permission from Japanese authorities so its athletes and officials could enter the country. Current Japanese law bans citizens of the country from entering Japan. On February 6, 2017, the Japanese government announced its decision to allow the North Korean delegation of 20 people to enter the country.

== Medal summary ==
=== Medal table ===
Sport	Gold	Silver	Bronze	Total
Figure skating	0	0	1	1
Totals (1 entries)	0	0	1	1

=== Medalists ===
Medal	Name	Sport	Event	Date
Bronze	Ryom Tae-ok; Kim Ju-sik	Figure skating	Pairs	25 February

== Competitors ==
The following table lists the North Korean delegation per sport and gender.

Sport	Men	Women	Total
Figure skating	1	1	2
Short track speed skating	5	0	5
Total	6	1	7

== Figure skating ==
North Korea has entered a two athletes into the pairs competition.

Athlete	Event	SP		FS		Total	
Athlete	Event	Points	Rank	Points	Rank	Points	Rank
Ryom Tae-ok / Kim Ju-sik	Pairs	65.22	3	112.18	3	177.40	3rd place, bronze medalist(s)

== Short track speed skating ==
North Korea has entered a full men's team of five athletes.

Men

- Kim Chol-gwang
- Kim Pyol-song
- Kim Tae-song
- Choe Un-song
- Pak Gwang-myong
