= Pierre Boda =

Australian short track speed skater

Pierre Boda (born 15 July 1993 in Camperdown) is an Australian Olympic short track speed skater. He competed at the 2011 World Short Track Speed Skating Championships in Sheffield, and at the 2012 World Short Track Speed Skating Championships in Shanghai. He competed at the 2014 Winter Olympics in Sochi, in men's 500 metres (short track speed skating).

In December 2016, Boda was named to Australia's team for the 2017 Asian Winter Games in Sapporo, Japan.
