= Wu Dajing =

Chinese speed skater (born 1994)

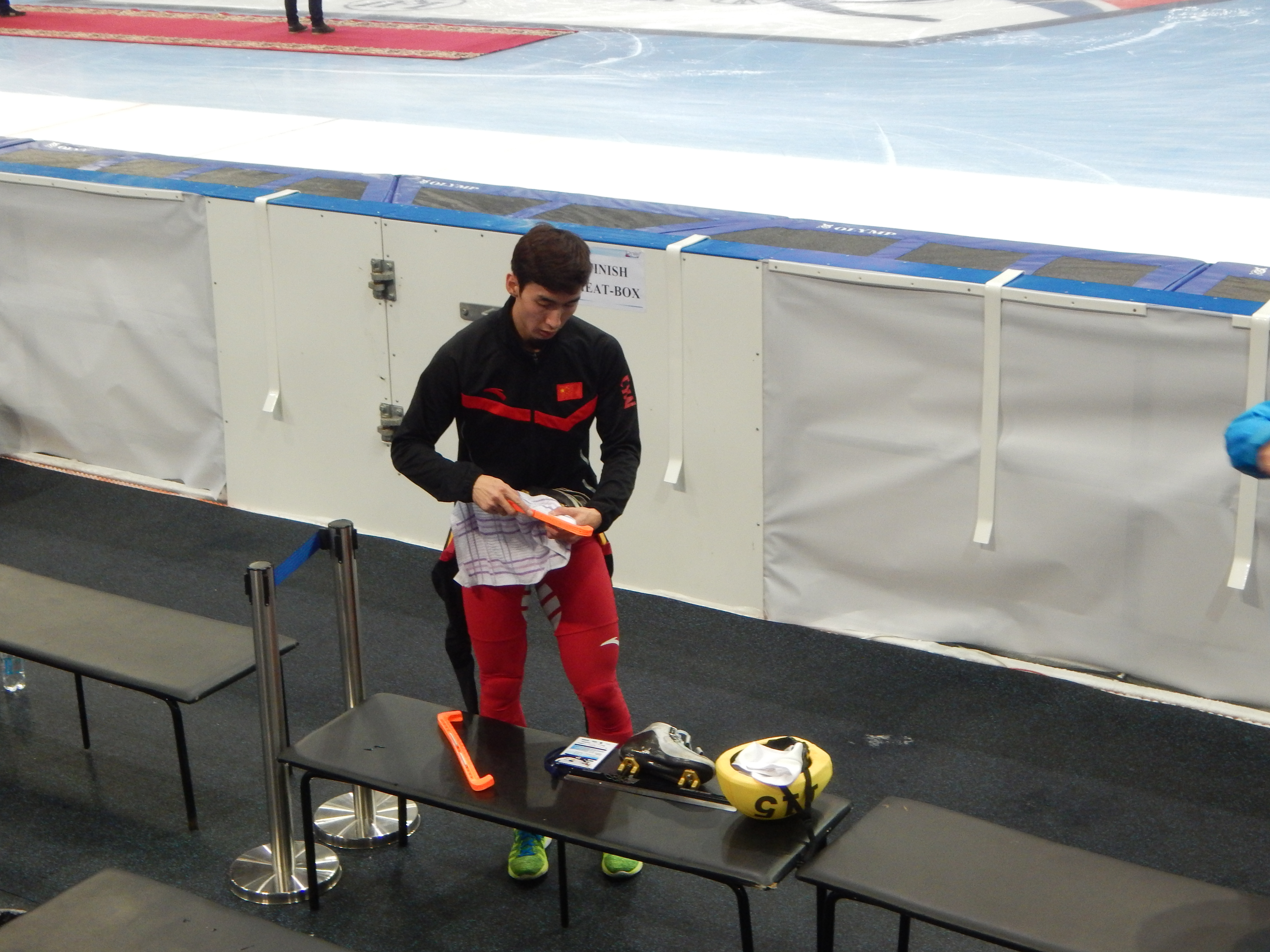
- Wu in 2015

Personal information
- Born: 24 July 1994 (age 32) Jiamusi, Heilongjiang, China
- Height: 1.82 m (6 ft 0 in)
- Weight: 73 kg (161 lb)

Sport
- Country: China
- Sport: Short-track speed skating
- Event: 500 m
- Club: Jilin Province
- Coached by: Li Yan, Kim Sun-tae, Viktor An (Ahn Hyun-soo)

Achievements and titles
- Personal bests: 500m: 39.505 WR (2018); 1000m: 1:23.380 (2017); 1500m: 2:12.926 (2016); 3000m: 4:51.835 (2016)
Medal record
Olympic Games
Gold medal – first place	2018 Pyeongchang	500 m
Gold medal – first place	2022 Beijing	2000 m mixed relay
Silver medal – second place	2014 Sochi	500 m
Silver medal – second place	2018 Pyeongchang	5000 m relay
Bronze medal – third place	2014 Sochi	5000 m relay
World Championships
Gold medal – first place	2014 Montreal	500 m
Gold medal – first place	2015 Moscow	500 m
Gold medal – first place	2015 Moscow	5000 m relay
Gold medal – first place	2016 Seoul	5000 m relay
Silver medal – second place	2016 Seoul	500 m
Silver medal – second place	2017 Rotterdam	500 m
Silver medal – second place	2017 Rotterdam	5000 m relay
Silver medal – second place	2019 Sofia	500 m
Silver medal – second place	2019 Sofia	5000 m relay
Bronze medal – third place	2015 Moscow	Overall
Bronze medal – third place	2016 Seoul	1000 m
Asian Games
Gold medal – first place	2017 Sapporo	500 m
Gold medal – first place	2017 Sapporo	5000 m relay
Silver medal – second place	2017 Sapporo	1500 m
World Junior Championships
Silver medal – second place	2011 Courmayeur	500 m
Bronze medal – third place	2010 Taipei	500 m
Bronze medal – third place	2011 Courmayeur	Overall

Wu Dajing
- Chinese: 武大靖
Transcriptions
Standard Mandarin
- Hanyu Pinyin: Wǔ Dàjìng
- Bopomofo: ㄨˇ ㄉㄚˋ ㄐㄧㄥˋ
- Gwoyeu Romatzyh: Wuu DahJinq
- Wade–Giles: Wu^{3} Ta^{4}ching^{4}
- Tongyong Pinyin: Wǔ Dàjìng
- Yale Romanization: Wǔ Dàjìng
- MPS2: Wǔ Dà-jìng
- IPA: [ù tâ tɕîŋ]

Wu Dajing (born 24 July 1994) is a Chinese short track speed skater. He is a gold medalist in the Men's 500 metres at the 2018 Winter Olympic Games in Pyeongchang. He won a gold medal in the Men's 500m at the 2014 ISU World Championships in Montreal, Canada.

== Career ==
He won China's only gold medal at the 2018 Winter Olympic Games in Pyeongchang. He won the Men's 500 metres, setting an Olympic record (heat) and two world records (quarterfinal and final) while leading wire-to-wire in all three contests en route to capturing the gold. He became only the second person in history to have skated the discipline in under 40 seconds, after American J. R. Celski who managed the feat in 2012 in Calgary at a much higher elevation where the reduced air density tends to give the skater an advantage due to lowered air resistance. Wu also won a silver medal with his teammates in the men's 5000m team relay.

Wu Dajing was China's flag bearer during the parade of nations at the opening ceremony of the 2017 Asian Winter Games.

In 2020, Wu Dajing made a special appearance in the Chinese drama TV series Skate into Love, and was later cast as Yang Gensi in the 2023 film The Volunteers: To the War.

Although they never officially confirmed their relationship, it was widely believed that he once dated a Korean woman studying in Canada. Several moments during competitions and interviews hinted at a public display of affection, fueling speculation. She also gained popularity as an influencer, admired for her beauty and charisma, after being seen on screen acting as his personal translator. However, due to their differing nationalities and the complications brought on by the COVID-19 pandemic, the two seemed to drift apart. After his retirement, they were spotted together multiple times in Beijing. While he appeared unbothered by public attention, she was often seen trying to keep a low profile.

== International competition podiums ==
Date	Competition	Location	Rank	Event	Result
9 January 2010	2010 World Junior Championships, Taipei	(Chinese Taipei) Taipei Arena	Bronze medal	500 m	43.107
26 February 2011	2011 World Junior Championships, Courmayeur	(Italy) Courmayeur Forum Sports Center	Silver medal	500 m	42.491
27 February 2011	2011 World Junior Championships, Courmayeur	(Italy) Courmayeur Forum Sports Center	Bronze medal	Overall	40 points
4 December 2011	2011–12 ISU World Cup, Nagoya	(Japan) Nippon Gaishi Hall	1st place, gold medalist(s)	5000 m relay	6:50.562
11 December 2011	2011–12 ISU World Cup, Shanghai	(China) Oriental Sports Center	1st place, gold medalist(s)	5000 m relay	6:38.567
2 December 2012	2012–13 ISU World Cup, Nagoya	(Japan) Nippon Gaishi Hall	3rd place, bronze medalist(s)	5000 m relay	6:47.885
9 December 2012	2012–13 ISU World Cup, Shanghai	(China) Oriental Sports Center	3rd place, bronze medalist(s)	500 m	40.911
2 February 2013	2012–13 ISU World Cup, Sochi	(Russia) Iceberg Skating Palace	2nd place, silver medalist(s)	500 m	41.095
3 February 2013	2012–13 ISU World Cup, Sochi	(Russia) Iceberg Skating Palace	1st place, gold medalist(s)	500 m	41.413
3 February 2013	2012–13 ISU World Cup, Sochi	(Russia) Iceberg Skating Palace	3rd place, bronze medalist(s)	5000 m relay	6:49.925
10 February 2013	2012–13 ISU World Cup, Dresden	(Germany) EnergieVerbund Arena	2nd place, silver medalist(s)	500 m	40.684
5 October 2013	2013–14 ISU World Cup, Seoul	(South Korea) Mokdong Ice Rink	2nd place, silver medalist(s)	500 m	40.637
6 October 2013	2013–14 ISU World Cup, Seoul	(South Korea) Mokdong Ice Rink	1st place, gold medalist(s)	1000 m	1:25.935
16 November 2013	2013–14 ISU World Cup, Kolomna	(Russia) Kolomna Speed Skating Center	3rd place, bronze medalist(s)	500 m	41.123
21 February 2014	2014 Winter Olympics, Sochi	(Russia) Iceberg Skating Palace	Silver medal	500 m	40.846
21 February 2014	2014 Winter Olympics, Sochi	(Russia) Iceberg Skating Palace	Bronze medal	5000 m relay	6:44.521
15 March 2014	2014 World Championships, Montreal	(Canada) Maurice Richard Arena	Gold medal	500 m	40.158
9 November 2014	2014–15 ISU World Cup, Salt Lake City	(United States) Utah Olympic Oval	3rd place, bronze medalist(s)	500 m	40.572
9 November 2014	2014–15 ISU World Cup, Salt Lake City	(United States) Utah Olympic Oval	2nd place, silver medalist(s)	5000 m relay	6:39.715
15 November 2014	2014–15 ISU World Cup, Montreal	(Canada) Maurice Richard Arena	1st place, gold medalist(s)	500 m	40.720
13 March 2015	2015 World Championships, Moscow	(Russia) Ice Palace Krylatskoye	Gold medal	500 m	41.032
15 March 2015	2015 World Championships, Moscow	(Russia) Ice Palace Krylatskoye	Bronze medal	3000 m	5:06.093
15 March 2015	2015 World Championships, Moscow	(Russia) Ice Palace Krylatskoye	Gold medal	5000 m relay	41.032
15 March 2015	2015 World Championships, Moscow	(Russia) Ice Palace Krylatskoye	Bronze medal	Overall	55 points
22 February 2018	2018 Winter Olympics, Pyeongchang	(South Korea) Gangneung Ice Arena	Gold medal	500 m	39.584 Former WR
22 February 2018	2018 Winter Olympics, Pyeongchang	(South Korea) Gangneung Ice Arena	Silver medal	5000 m relay	6:32.035
5 February 2022	2022 Winter Olympics, Beijing	(China) Capital Indoor Stadium	Gold medal	2000 m mixed relay	2:37.348

Olympic Games
Preceded by Liu Qiuhong	Flagbearer for China at the Olympics closing ceremony Pyeongchang 2018	Succeeded by Xu Mengtao & Gao Tingyu
