= Choe Un-song =

North Korean speed skater (born 1992)

Personal information
- Nationality: North Korean
- Born: 7 December 1992 (age 32)
- Height: 1.70 m (5 ft 7 in)

Sport
- Country: North Korea
- Sport: Short track speed skating
- Coached by: Yun Chol

Choe Un-song (Korean: 최은성, born 7 December 1992) is a North Korean short track speed skater. He is coached by Yun Chol.

== Career ==
Choe is from Manpo, North Korea, where his father gave him a pair of skates, sparking his interest in speed skating. Choe first went to the Manpo Youth Sports School and continued training at the Ganggye-dong First Education University.

=== 2018 Winter Olympics ===
Choe competed in the 2018 Winter Olympics in the men's 1500 metres discipline. He finished last in his heat with a time of 2:18.213 and did not advance to the semifinal, despite being enthusiastically cheered on by a group of 100 North Korean cheerleaders in the stands. Before the heat, he had been injured during a training session in Pyeongchang.
