= Seo Yi-ra =

South Korean short track speed skater

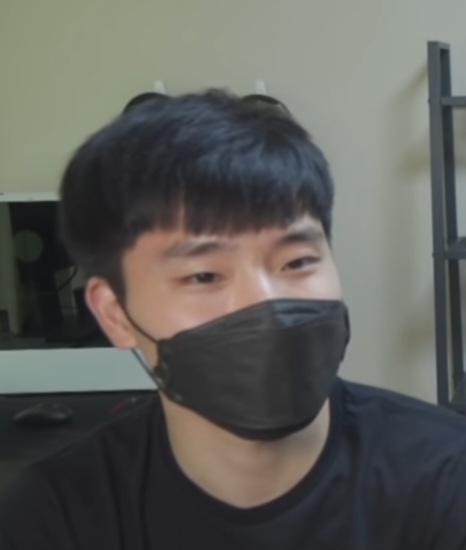

Personal information
- Nationality: South Korean
- Born: 31 October 1992 (age 33) Seoul, South Korea
- Height: 1.68 m (5 ft 6 in)
- Weight: 65 kg (143 lb)

Sport
- Country: South Korea
- Sport: Short track speed skating
Medal record
Olympic Games
| Bronze medal – third place | 2018 Pyeongchang | 1000 m |
World Championships
| Gold medal – first place | 2017 Rotterdam | Overall |
| Gold medal – first place | 2017 Rotterdam | 1000 m |
| Gold medal – first place | 2018 Montreal | 5000 m relay |
| Silver medal – second place | 2017 Rotterdam | 3000 m |
| Silver medal – second place | 2024 Rotterdam | 5000 m relay |
| Bronze medal – third place | 2017 Rotterdam | 500 m |
| Bronze medal – third place | 2017 Rotterdam | 1500 m |
World Junior Championships
| Gold medal – first place | 2011 Courmayeur | Overall |
Asian Winter Games
| Gold medal – first place | 2017 Sapporo | 1000 m |
| Silver medal – second place | 2017 Sapporo | 500 m |
| Silver medal – second place | 2017 Sapporo | 5000 m relay |

- Seo Yi-ra
- Hangul: 서이라
- RR: Seo Ira
- MR: Sŏ Ira

Seo Yi-ra (Korean: 서이라; born 31 October 1992) is a South Korean short track speed skater. He competed in the 2018 Winter Olympics.

Seo Yi-ra advanced past the first heat to the semifinals in the 1,500 speed skate event. He did not advance to the finals.
