= Steavanus Wihardja =

Indonesian short track speed skater

Personal information
- Nationality: Indonesian

Sport
- Sport: Short track speed skating
Medal record
Men's short track speed skating
Representing Indonesia
SEA Games
Silver medal – second place	2017 Kuala Lumpur	Men's 500 m
Silver medal – second place	2019 Philippines	Men's 500 m
Silver medal – second place	2019 Philippines	Men's 1000 m
Bronze medal – third place	2019 Philippines	Men's 3000 m relay

Steavanus Wihardja is an Indonesian short track speed skater. He competed at the 2019 SEA Games in Manila, Philippines.
