= Australia at the 2017 Asian Winter Games =

- IOC code: AUS
- NOC: Australian Olympic Committee

in Sapporo and Obihiro 19–26 February
- Competitors: 30 in 3 sports
- Flag bearer: Deanna Lockett (Opening Ceremony) Jakara Anthony (Closing Ceremony)
- Medals: Gold 0 Silver 0 Bronze 0 Total 0

Asian Winter Games appearances
- 2017; 2025; 2029

Australia competed in the 2017 Asian Winter Games in Sapporo and Obihiro, Japan from 19 to 26 February. The event marked the debut of the country at the Asian Winter Games, however its athletes were not eligible to win any medals, as the team was classified as guest competitors.

Australia's team of 30 athletes (18 men and 12 women) competed in three sports (eight disciplines). The team consisted mostly of developmental athletes, mixed with some who were expected to qualify for the 2018 Winter Olympics in PyeongChang, South Korea.

Short track speed skater Deanna Lockett was the country's flagbearer during the parade of nations at the opening ceremony.

== Competitors ==
The following table lists the Australian delegation per sport and gender.

Sport	Men	Women	Total
Alpine skiing	1	1	2
Biathlon	2	2	4
Cross-country skiing	2	1	3
Figure skating	3	3	6
Freestyle skiing	2	2	4
Short track speed skating	5	1	6
Speed skating	1	0	1
Snowboarding	2	2	4
Total	18	12	30

== Alpine skiing ==
Australia's alpine skiing delegation consists of two athletes, one male and one female.

Athlete	Event	Run 1		Run 2		Total	
Athlete	Event	Time	Rank	Time	Rank	Time	Rank
Liam Michael	Men's lalom						
Liam Michael	Men's giant slalom						
Zanna Farrell	Women's slalom						
Zanna Farrell	Women's giant slalom						

== Biathlon ==
Australia's biathlon team consists of four athletes, two men and two women.

Men

- Jeremy Flanagan
- Damon Morton

Women

- Jillian Colebourn
- Darcie Morton

== Cross-country skiing ==
Australia's cross-country skiing team consists of three athletes, two men and one woman. Casey Wright finished third in the Women's sprint classical.

Men

- Jackson Bursill
- Ben Sim

Woman

- Casey Wright

== Figure skating ==
Australia's figure skating team consists of six athletes.

Athlete(s)	Event	SP/SD		FS/FD		Total	
Athlete(s)	Event	Points	Rank	Points	Rank	Points	Rank
Brendan Kerry	Men's						
Kailani Craine	Ladies						
Paris Stephens / Matthew Dodds	Pairs						
Matilda Friend / William Badaoui	Ice dancing	42.56	6	63.42	6	105.98	6

== Freestyle skiing ==
Australia's freestyle skiing team consists of four athletes, two men and two women.

Men

- Ben Matsumoto
- Cooper Woods-Topalovic

Women

- Jakara Anthony
- Sophie Ash

== Short track speed skating ==
Australia's short track speed skating team consists of six athletes, five men and one woman.

Men

- Pierre Boda
- Denali Blunden
- Keanu Blunden
- Alex Bryant
- Andy Jung

Woman

- Deanna Lockett

== Speed skating ==
Australia's speed skating squad consists of one male athlete.

Men

- Joshua Capponi

== Snowboarding ==
Australia's snowboarding team consists of four athletes, two men and two women.

Alpine

Athlete	Event	Run 1		Run 2		Total	
Athlete	Event	Time	Rank	Time	Rank	Time	Rank
Nicholas Masjuk	Men's giant slalom	1:02.51	19	50.02	17	1:52.53	17
Nicholas Masjuk	Men's slalom	51.80	19	42.66	15	1:34.46	15
Christian De Oliveira	Men's giant slalom	55.61	10	46.12	9	1:41.73	10
Christian De Oliveira	Men's slalom	44.06	12	37.09	8	1:21.15	9
Millie Bongiorno	Women's giant slalom	1:01.55	6	53.58	8	1:55.13	8
Millie Bongiorno	Women's slalom	49.40	8	43.12	7	1:32.52	8

Halfpipe

- Holly Crawford – halfpipe
