= Hiroki Yokoyama (speed skater) =

Japanese short-track speed skater (born 1994)

Personal information
- Nationality: Japanese
- Born: 18 February 1994 (age 32)
- Height: 168 cm (5 ft 6 in)
- Weight: 60 kg (132 lb)

Sport
- Country: Japan
- Sport: Short track speed skating
Medal record
World Championships
Bronze medal – third place	2018 Montréal	5000 m Relay
Asian Winter Games
Bronze medal – third place	2017 Sapporo	5000 m relay

Hiroki Yokoyama (横山 大希, Yokoyama Hiroki; born 18 February 1994) is a Japanese short track speed skater. He competed in the 2018 Winter Olympics.
