= Yerkebulan Shamukhanov =

Kazakh short-track speed skater

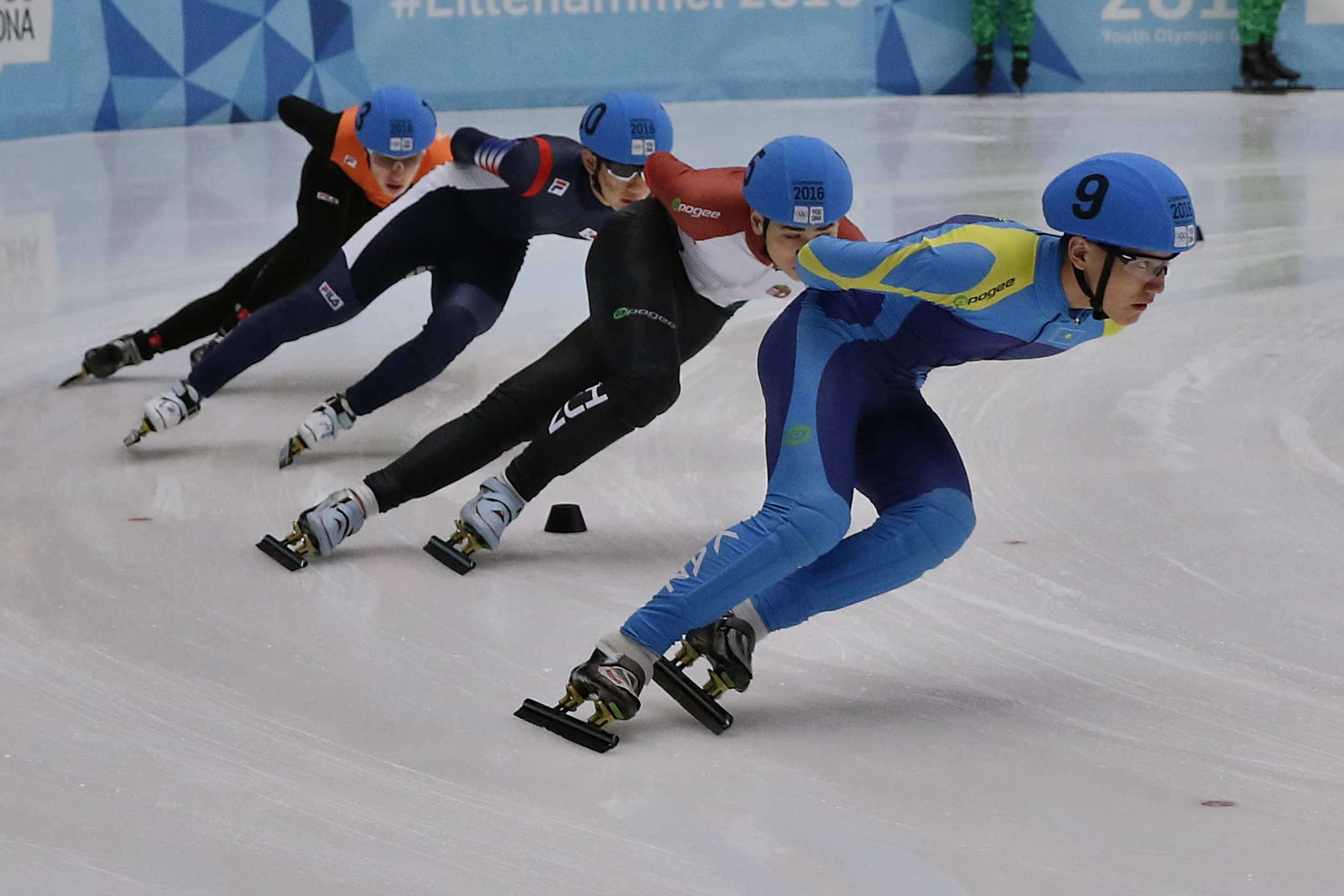
- Shamukhanov (front) at the 2016 Winter Youth Olympics

Personal information
- Nationality: Kazakhstani
- Born: 23 August 1999 (age 26)
- Height: 1.73 m (5 ft 8 in)
- Weight: 68 kg (150 lb)

Sport
- Country: Kazakhstan
- Sport: Short track speed skating
Medal record
Representing Kazakhstan
Winter Universiade
| Silver medal – second place | 2023 Lake Placid | 2000 m relay |
| Bronze medal – third place | 2019 Krasnoyarsk | 5000 m relay |

Yerkebulan Shamukhanov (Еркебулан Казыбекович Шамуханов, born 23 August 1999) is a Kazakhstani short track speed skater. He competed in the 2018 Winter Olympics.
