= Keita Watanabe =

Japanese speed skater (born 1992)

Personal information
- Nationality: Japanese
- Born: 25 March 1992 (age 34) Kawagoe, Japan
- Height: 1.72 m (5 ft 8 in)
- Weight: 65 kg (143 lb)

Sport
- Country: Japan
- Sport: Short track speed skating
- Event(s): 1000 m, 3000 m
- Club: Hannan University
Medal record
World Championships
Bronze medal – third place	2018 Montreal	5000 m relay
Asian Winter Games
Bronze medal – third place	2017 Sapporo	1000 m
Bronze medal – third place	2017 Sapporo	5000 m relay

Keita Watanabe (渡邊 啓太, Watanabe Keita; born 25 March 1992) is a Japanese short track speed skater. He competed in the 2018 Winter Olympics and 2026 Winter Olympics.
