= 2015–16 ISU Short Track Speed Skating World Cup =

International speed skating competition

ISU Short Track World Cup
- Dates: 2015–16

The 2015–16 ISU Short Track Speed Skating World Cup was a multi-race tournament over a season for short track speed skating. The season began on 30 October 2015 in Canada and ended on 14 February 2016. The World Cup was organised by the ISU who also ran world cups and championships in speed skating and figure skating. Toronto hosted a world cup competition for the first time ever.

== Calendar ==
=== Men ===
==== Montreal 30 October – 1 November 2015 ====
Date	Place	Distance	Winner	Second	Third	Reference
1 November 2015	Maurice Richard Arena	500m	(China) Wu Dajing	(Canada) Charle Cournoyer	(South Korea) Park Se-yeong	
31 October 2015; 1 November 2015	Maurice Richard Arena	1000m (1); 1000m (2)	(China) Han Tianyu (Canada) Charles Hamelin	(China) Shi Jingnan (Canada) Samuel Girard	(Russia) Artem Kozlov (Russia) Semen Elistratov	
31 October 2015	Maurice Richard Arena	1500m	(South Korea) Kwak Yoon-Gy	(Netherlands) Sjinkie Knegt	(China) Xu Fu	
1 November 2015	Maurice Richard Arena	5000m relay	China; Shi Jingnan; Chen Guang; Han Tianyu; Xu Fu	Netherlands; Freek van der Wart; Daan Breeuwsma; Sjinkie Knegt; Leon Bloemhof	Hungary; Csaba Burján; Viktor Knoch; Sándor Liu Shaolin; Shaoang Liu	

==== Toronto 6–8 November 2015 ====
Date	Place	Distance	Winner	Second	Third	Reference
6 November 2015; 7 November 2015	MasterCard Centre	500m (1); 500m (2)	(Canada) Samuel Girard (Canada) Charles Hamelin	(Canada) Alexander Fathoullin (Hungary) Sándor Liu Shaolin	(France) Sébastien Lepape (Hungary) Viktor Knoch	
6 November 2015	MasterCard Centre	1000m	(Canada) Charle Cournoyer	(South Korea) Seo Yi-ra	(South Korea) Kwak Yoon-Gy	
6 November 2015	MasterCard Centre	1500m	(South Korea) Kwak Yoon-Gy	(Netherlands) Sjinkie Knegt	(Canada) Francois Hamelin	
6 November 2015	MasterCard Centre	5000m relay	Canada; Charle Cournoyer; Samuel Girard; Charles Hamelin; Patrick Duffy	(South Korea) South Korea; Park Se-yeong; Park Ji-won; Kwak Yoon-gy; Seo Yi-ra	(China) China; Shi Jingnan; Wu Dajing; Chen Guang; Han Tianyu	

==== Nagoya 4–6 December 2015 ====
Date	Place	Distance	Winner	Second	Third	Reference
5 December 2015	Nippon Gaishi Arena	500m	(Canada) Charles Hamelin (Canada) Francois Hamelin	(South Korea) Kwak Yoon-gy (Russia) Artem Kozlov	(Canada) Francois Hamelin (China) Chen Guang	
5 December 2015	Nippon Gaishi Arena	1000m	(Russia) Semen Elistratov	(Hungary) Sándor Liu Shaolin	(Netherlands) Freek van der Wart	
5 December 2015	Nippon Gaishi Arena	1500m	(Netherlands) Sjinkie Knegt	(Russia) Semen Elistratov	(South Korea) Park Ji-won	
6 December 2015	Nippon Gaishi Arena	5000m relay	Netherlands; Freek van der Wart; Daan Breeuwsma; Sjinkie Knegt; Dennis Visser	China; Shi Jingnan; Chen Guang; Han Tianyu; Ma Wei	Canada; Charle Cournoyer; Patrick Duffy; Charles Hamelin; François Hamelin	

==== Shanghai 11–13 December 2015 ====
Date	Place	Distance	Winner	Second	Third	Reference
13 December 2015	Oriental Sports Center	500m	(China) Wu Dajing	(Netherlands) Sjinkie Knegt	(Canada) Samuel Girard	
12 December 2015	Oriental Sports Center	1000m	(South Korea) Kwak Yoon-gy	(Canada) Charle Cournoyer	(Russia) Semen Elistratov	
12 December 2015; 13 December 2015	Oriental Sports Center	1500m (1); 1500m (2)	(Canada) Charles Hamelin (China) Ren Ziwei	(Netherlands) Sjinkie Knegt (South Korea) Park Ji-won	(South Korea) Park Se-yeong (South Korea) Kwak Yoon-gy	
13 December 2015	Oriental Sports Center	5000m relay	Hungary; Csaba Burján; Viktor Knoch; Shaoang Liu; Sándor Liu Shaolin	Italy; Andrea Cassinelli; Tommaso Dotti; Nicola Rodigari; Yuri Confortola	Canada; Patrick Duffy; Samuel Girard; Charles Hamelin; Charle Cournoyer	

==== Dresden 5–7 February 2016 ====
Date	Place	Distance	Winner	Second	Third	Reference
7 February 2016	EnergieVerbund Arena	500m	(Canada) Charles Hamelin	(Russia) Semen Elistratov	(Russia) Dmitry Migunov	
7 February 2016	EnergieVerbund Arena	1000m	(Canada) Charles Hamelin	(Russia) Semen Elistratov	(Canada) Charle Cournoyer	
7 February 2016	EnergieVerbund Arena	1500m (1); 1500m (2)	(South Korea) Park Ji-won (South Korea) Seo Yi-ra	(South Korea) Park Se-yeong (Canada) Alexander Fathoullin	(Netherlands) Sjinkie Knegt (South Korea) Kwak Yoon-gy	
7 February 2016	EnergieVerbund Arena	5000m relay	(Russia) Russia; Dmitry Migunov; Aleksandr Shulginov; Vladimir Grigoryev; Semion Elistratov	(Canada) Canada; Alexander Fathoullin; Samuel Girard; Charles Hamelin; Charle Cournoyer	(United States) United States; Keith Carroll; John-Henry Krueger; Aaron Tron; Cole Krueger	

==== Dordrecht 12–14 February 2016 ====
Date	Place	Distance	Winner	Second	Third	Reference
14 February 2016	Sportboulevard Dordrecht	500m	(Russia) Dmitry Migunov	(United Kingdom) Paul Stanley	(South Korea) Kwak Yoon-Gy	
14 February 2016	Sportboulevard Dordrecht	1000m (1); 1000m (2)	(South Korea) Park Se-yeong (Canada) Charle Cournoyer	(Hungary) Sándor Liu Shaolin (South Korea) Park Ji-won	(South Korea) Kim Joon-chun (Russia) Semen Elistratov	
14 February 2016	Sportboulevard Dordrecht	1500m	(Israel) Vladislav Bykanov	(South Korea) Kwak Yoon-Gy	(South Korea) Lee Jung-Su	
14 February 2016	Sportboulevard Dordrecht	5000m relay	(Russia) Russia; Dmitry Migunov; Artiom Kozlov; Vladimir Grigoryev; Semion Elistratov	(Netherlands) Netherlands; Freek van der Wart; Itzhak de Laat; Mark Prinsen; Dennis Visser	(Canada) Canada; Patrick Duffy; François Hamelin; Alexander Fathoullin; Charle Cournoyer	

=== Women ===
==== Montreal 30 October – 1 November 2015 ====
Date	Place	Distance	Winner	Second	Third	Reference
1 November 2015	Maurice Richard Arena	500m	(Canada) Marianne St-Gelais	(Poland) Natalia Maliszewska	(Russia) Sofia Prosvirnova	
31 October 2015; 1 November 2015	Maurice Richard Arena	1000m (1); 1000m (2)	(South Korea) Choi Min-jeong (South Korea) Shim Suk-hee	(Canada) Marianne St-Gelais (South Korea) Choi Min-jeong	(China) Fan Kexin (China) Tao Jiaying	
31 October 2015	Maurice Richard Arena	1500m	(South Korea) Shim Suk-hee	(Canada) Kim Boutin	(Germany) Anna Seidel	
1 November 2015	Maurice Richard Arena	3000m relay	(South Korea) South Korea; Choi Min-jeong; Kim A-lang; Lee Eun-byul; Shim Suk-hee	(Canada) Canada; Jamie MacDonald; Valérie Maltais; Marianne St-Gelais; Kasandra Bradette	(Russia) Russia; Emina Malagich; Sofia Prosvirnova; Ekaterina Strelkova; Ekaterina Konstantinova	

==== Toronto 6–8 November 2015 ====
Date	Place	Distance	Winner	Second	Third	Reference
6 November 2015; 7 November 2015	MasterCard Centre	500m (1); 500m (2)	(United Kingdom) Elise Christie (South Korea) Choi Min-jeong	(Netherlands) Lara van Ruijven (Canada) Marianne St-Gelais	(China) Fan Kexin (China) Han Yutong	
6 November 2015	MasterCard Centre	1000m	(South Korea) Shim Suk-hee	(United Kingdom) Elise Christie	(Canada) Valérie Maltais	
6 November 2015	MasterCard Centre	1500m	(South Korea) Choi Min-jeong	(South Korea) Shim Suk-hee	(Canada) Marianne St-Gelais	
6 November 2015	MasterCard Centre	3000m relay	(South Korea) South Korea; Shim Suk-hee; Choi Min-jeong; Kim A-lang; Noh Do-hee	(China) China; Fan Kexin; Zang Yize; Tao Jiaying; Han Yutong	(Russia) Russia; Tatiana Borodulina; Ekaterina Konstantinova; Sofia Prosvirnova; Emina Malagich	

==== Nagoya 4–6 December 2015 ====
Date	Place	Distance	Winner	Second	Third	Reference
5 December 2015	Nippon Gaishi Arena	500m (1); 500m (2)	(China) Fan Kexin (China) Fan Kexin	(United Kingdom) Elise Christie (Germany) Anna Seidel	(Canada) Marianne St-Gelais (Canada) Audrey Phaneuf	
5 December 2015	Nippon Gaishi Arena	1000m	(South Korea) Choi Min-jeong	(Canada) Marianne St-Gelais	(South Korea) Kim A-lang	
5 December 2015	Nippon Gaishi Arena	1500m	(South Korea) Choi Min-jeong	(South Korea) Shim Suk-hee	(South Korea) Noh Do-hee	
6 December 2015	Nippon Gaishi Arena	3000m relay	(South Korea) South Korea; Shim Suk-hee; Choi Min-jeong; Kim A-lang; Noh Do-hee	(China) China; Fan Kexin; Zang Yize; Yin Qi; Tao Jiaying	(Canada) Canada; Audrey Phaneuf; Kasandra Bradette; Valérie Maltais; Marianne St-Gelais	

==== Shanghai 11–13 December 2015 ====
Date	Place	Distance	Winner	Second	Third	Reference
13 December 2015	Oriental Sports Center	500m	(China) Fan Kexin	(Canada) Marianne St-Gelais	(China) Qu Chunyu	
12 December 2015	Oriental Sports Center	1000m	(Canada) Valérie Maltais	(Netherlands) Suzanne Schulting	(South Korea) Shim Suk-hee	
12 December 2015; 13 December 2015	Oriental Sports Center	1500m (1); 1500m (2)	(South Korea) Choi Min-jeong (South Korea) Shim Suk-hee	(China) Tao Jiaying (Canada) Valérie Maltais	(United Kingdom) Charlotte Gilmartin (South Korea) Kim A-lang	
13 December 2015	Oriental Sports Center	3000m relay	(South Korea) South Korea; Noh Do-hee; Choi Min-jeong; Kim A-lang; Shim Suk-hee	(Canada) Canada; Audrey Phaneuf; Kasandra Bradette; Valérie Maltais; Marianne St-Gelais	(Netherlands) Netherlands; Suzanne Schulting; Rianne de Vries; Yara van Kerkhof; Lara van Ruijven	

==== Dresden 5–7 February 2016 ====
Date	Place	Distance	Winner	Second	Third	Reference
7 February 2016	EnergieVerbund Arena	500m	(Canada) Marianne St-Gelais	(United Kingdom) Elise Christie	(Netherlands) Lara van Ruijven	
7 February 2016	EnergieVerbund Arena	1000m	(Canada) Marianne St-Gelais	(China) Tao Jiaying	(Hungary) Petra Jaszapati	
7 February 2016	EnergieVerbund Arena	1500m (1); 1500m (2)	(United Kingdom) Elise Christie (South Korea) Choi Min-jeong	(South Korea) Choi Min-jeong (South Korea) Noh Do-hee	(South Korea) Kim Alang (South Korea) Kim Alang	
7 February 2016	EnergieVerbund Arena	5000m relay	(Italy) Italy; Arianna Valcepina; Cecilia Maffei; Arianna Fontana; Elena Viviani	(Hungary) Hungary; Bernadett Heidum; Sára Luca Bácskai; Petra Jászapáti; Andrea Keszler	(Japan) Japan; Moemi Kikuchi; Ayuko Itō; Sumire Kikuchi; Hitomi Saito	

==== Dordrecht 12–14 February 2016 ====
Date	Place	Distance	Winner	Second	Third	Reference
14 February 2016	Sportboulevard Dordrecht	500m	(United Kingdom) Elise Christie	(South Korea) Choi Min-jeong	(Canada) Marianne St-Gelais	
14 February 2016	Sportboulevard Dordrecht	1000m (1); 1000m (2)	(United Kingdom) Elise Christie (South Korea) Noh Do-hee	(South Korea) Choi Min-jeong (Canada) Valérie Maltais	(Canada) Jamie Macdonald (China) Tao Jiaying	
14 February 2016	Sportboulevard Dordrecht	1500m	(Canada) Marianne St-Gelais	(China) Guo Yihan	(Netherlands) Suzanne Schulting	
14 February 2016	Sportboulevard Dordrecht	5000m relay	(Italy) Italy; Arianna Valcepina; Lucia Peretti; Arianna Fontana; Elena Viviani	(Russia) Russia; Emina Malagich; Tatiana Borodulina; Evgeniya Zakharova; Ekaterina Efremenkova	(France) France; Véronique Pierron; Tifany Huot-Marchand; Aurélie Monvoisin; Selma Poutsma	

== World Cup standings ==
=== Men's 500 metres ===
Final standings after 8 events

Pos	Athlete	Points
1.	Dmitry Migunov (RUS)	31810
2.	Charles Hamelin (CAN)	30342
3.	Samuel Girard (CAN)	25616
4.	Wu Dajing (CHN)	23280
5.	François Hamelin (CAN)	20100

=== Women's 500 metres ===
Final standings after 8 events

Pos	Athlete	Points
1.	Marianne St-Gelais (CAN)	48800
2.	Elise Christie (GBR)	45216
3.	Fan Kexin (CHN)	43198
4.	Lara van Ruijven (NED)	24138
5.	Choi Min-jeong (KOR)	23120

=== Men's 1000 metres ===
Final standings after 8 events

Pos	Athlete	Points
1.	Semen Elistratov (RUS)	37200
2.	Charle Cournoyer (CAN)	34599
3.	Charles Hamelin (CAN)	25120
4.	Sándor Liu Shaolin (HUN)	17678
5.	Kwak Yoon-Gy (KOR)	16415

=== Women's 1000 metres ===
Final standings after 8 events

Pos	Athlete	Points
1.	Choi Min-jeong (KOR)	36000
2.	Valérie Maltais (CAN)	29019
3.	Shim Suk-hee (KOR)	26400
4.	Marianne St-Gelais (CAN)	26000
5.	Tao Jiaying (CHN)	25970

=== Men's 1500 metres ===
Final standings after 8 events

Pos	Athlete	Points
1.	Kwak Yoon-gy (KOR)	45920
2.	Sjinkie Knegt (NED)	43677
3.	Park Ji-won (KOR)	30593
4.	François Hamelin (CAN)	17311
5.	Charles Hamelin (CAN)	13457

=== Women's 1500 metres ===
Final standings after 8 events

Pos	Athlete	Points
1.	Choi Min-jeong (KOR)	48000
2.	Shim Suk-hee (KOR)	36000
3.	Noh Do-hee (KOR)	23020
4.	Valérie Maltais (CAN)	21900
5.	Marianne St-Gelais (CAN)	19677

=== Men's 5000 metre relay ===
Final standings after 6 events

Pos	Athlete	Points
1.	Canada	30800
2.	Netherlands	30096
3.	China	29520
4.	Russia	27373
5.	Hungary	25616

=== Women's 3000 metre relay ===
Final standings after 6 events

Pos	Athlete	Points
1.	South Korea	40000
2.	Canada	27520
3.	China	26240
4.	Russia	25920
5.	Italy	25242

=== Men's overall ===
Final standings after 6 events

Pos	Athlete	Points
1	Canada	52400
2	South Korea	43920
3	Russia	34893
4	China	32493
5	Netherlands	27452

=== Women's overall ===
Final standings after 6 events

Pos	Athlete	Points
1	South Korea	54400
2	Canada	47200
3	China	44900
4	Netherlands	24830
5	Russia	21912

== Medal table ==
Rank	Nation	Gold	Silver	Bronze	Total
1	South Korea	22	14	15	51
2	Canada	16	15	14	45
3	China	8	7	9	24
4	Russia	4	5	8	17
5	Great Britain	4	4	1	9
6	Netherlands	2	8	5	15
7	Italy	2	1	0	3
8	Hungary	1	4	3	8
9	Israel	1	0	0	1
10	Germany	0	1	1	2
11	Poland	0	1	0	1
12	France	0	0	2	2
13	Japan	0	0	1	1
13	United States	0	0	1	1
Totals (14 entries)		60	60	60	180

== See also ==
- 2016 World Short Track Speed Skating Championships
- 2016 European Short Track Speed Skating Championships
