= 2014–15 ISU Short Track Speed Skating World Cup =

International speed skating competition

ISU Short Track World Cup
- Dates: 2014–15

The 2014–15 ISU Short Track Speed Skating World Cup was a multi-race tournament over a season for short track speed skating. The season began on 7 November 2014 and ended on 15 February 2015. The World Cup was organised by the ISU who also ran world cups and championships in speed skating and figure skating. In a break from normal tradition, the 4th leg of the world cup, held in Seoul, included a 3000m individual event for both the Men and Women.

== Calendar ==
=== Men ===
==== Salt Lake City 7–9 November 2014 ====
Date	Place	Distance	Winner	Second	Third	Reference
9 November 2014	Utah Olympic Oval	500m	(United States) John-Henry Krueger	(Netherlands) Sjinkie Knegt	(China) Wu Dajing	
8 November 2014; 9 November 2014	Utah Olympic Oval	1000m	(Russia) Viktor Ahn (1) (South Korea) Seo Yi-ra (2)	(South Korea) Park Se-yeong (1) (Russia) Semion Elistratov (2)	(Netherlands) Sjinkie Knegt (1) (Russia) Ruslan Zakharov (2)	
8 November 2014	Utah Olympic Oval	1500m	(South Korea) Sin Da-woon	(Canada) Charles Hamelin	(South Korea) Lee Jung-su	
9 November 2014	Utah Olympic Oval	5000m relay	Russia; Semion Elistratov; Dmitry Migunov; Vladimir Grigorev; Viktor Ahn	China; Wu Dajing; Chen Dequan; Xu Hongzhi; Han Tianyu	United States; Cole Krueger; John-Henry Krueger; Keith Carroll; Ryan Pivirotto	

==== Montreal 14–16 November 2014 ====
Date	Place	Distance	Winner	Second	Third	Reference
15 November 2014; 16 November 2014	Maurice Richard Arena	500m	(China) Wu Dajing (1) (Russia) Dmitry Migunov (2)	(Russia) Dmitry Migunov (1) (Russia) Vladimir Grigorev (2)	(South Korea) Kwak Yoon-gy (1) (United States) John-Henry Krueger (2)	
16 November 2014	Maurice Richard Arena	1000m	(South Korea) Sin Da-woon	(Russia) Semion Elistratov	(Hungary) Sándor Liu Shaolin	
15 November 2014	Maurice Richard Arena	1500m	(South Korea) Park Se-yeong	(South Korea) Sin Da-woon	(Netherlands) Sjinkie Knegt	
16 November 2014	Maurice Richard Arena	5000m relay	South Korea; Kwak Yoon-gy; Park Se-yeong; Seo Yi-ra; Sin Da-woon	Hungary; Viktor Knoch; Csaba Burján; Sándor Liu Shaolin; Shaoang Liu	United Kingdom; Jon Eley; Paul Stanley; Jack Whelbourne; Richard Shoebridge	

==== Shanghai 12–14 December 2014 ====
Date	Place	Distance	Winner	Second	Third	Reference
13 December 2014; 14 December 2014	Shanghai Oriental Sports Center	500m	(South Korea) Kwak Yoon-gy (1) (Russia) Dmitry Migunov (2)	(Hungary) Sándor Liu Shaolin(1) (United States) John-Henry Krueger (2)	(Russia) Dmitry Migunov (1) (Canada) William Preudhomme (2)	
14 December 2014	Shanghai Oriental Sports Center	1000m	(Canada) Charles Hamelin	(Netherlands) Sjinkie Knegt	(Hungary) Sándor Liu Shaolin	
13 December 2014	Shanghai Oriental Sports Center	1500m	(South Korea) Sin Da-woon	(Canada) Charles Hamelin	(United States) John-Henry Krueger	
14 December 2014	Shanghai Oriental Sports Center	5000m relay	South Korea; Han Seungsoo; Sin Da-woon; Kwak Yoon-gy; Seo Yi-ra	Netherlands; Daan Breeuwsma; Sjinkie Knegt; Freek van der Wart; Itzhak de Laat	Canada; Samuel Girard; Charles Hamelin; François Hamelin; Patrick Duffy	

==== Seoul 19–21 December 2014 ====
Date	Place	Distance	Winner	Second	Third	Reference
21 December 2014	Mokdong Ice Rink	500m	(South Korea) Seo Yi-ra	(Netherlands) Sjinkie Knegt	(Canada) Charles Hamelin	
20 December 2014	Mokdong Ice Rink	1000m	(China) Wu Dajing	(South Korea) Kwak Yoon-gy	(Netherlands) Sjinkie Knegt	
20 December 2014	Mokdong Ice Rink	1500m	(South Korea) Sin Da-woon	(China) Chen Dequan	(South Korea) Park Se-yeong	
21 December 2014	Mokdong Ice Rink	3000m	(South Korea) Lee Jung-su	(South Korea) Kwak Yoon-gy	(South Korea) Sin Da-woon	
21 December 2014	Mokdong Ice Rink	5000m relay	Netherlands; Daan Breeuwsma; Freek van der Wart; Sjinkie Knegt; Adwin Snellink	Canada; Charles Hamelin; Patrick Duffy; Charle Cournoyer; Samuel Girard	China; Wu Dajing; Chen Dequan; Xu Hongzhi; Zhang Hongchao	

==== Dresden 6–8 February 2015 ====
Date	Place	Distance	Winner	Second	Third	Reference
8 February 2015	EnergieVerbund Arena	500m	(Russia) Dmitry Migunov	(Canada) François Hamelin	(South Korea) Kwak Yoon-gy	
7 February 2015	EnergieVerbund Arena	1000m	(Russia) Semion Elistratov	(Russia) Vladimir Grigorev	(Netherlands) Sjinkie Knegt	
7 February 2015; 8 February 2015	EnergieVerbund Arena	1500m	(South Korea) Sin Da-woon (1) (Russia) Semion Elistratov (2)	(South Korea) Park Se-yeong (1) (South Korea) Han Seungsoo (2)	(China) Chen Dequan (1) (Canada) Charles Hamelin (2)	
8 February 2015	EnergieVerbund Arena	5000m relay	Netherlands; Daan Breeuwsma; Sjinkie Knegt; Mark Prinsen; Freek van der Wart	Hungary; Shaoang Liu; Sándor Liu Shaolin; Csaba Burján; Viktor Knoch	China; Shi Jingnan; Wu Dajing; Chen Dequan; Han Tianyu	

==== Erzurum 13–15 February 2015 ====
Date	Place	Distance	Winner	Second	Third	Reference
15 February 2015		500m	(Hungary) Viktor Knoch	(China) Wu Dajing	(Canada) Charles Hamelin	
14 February 2015; 15 February 2015		1000m	(Russia) Semion Elistratov (1) (South Korea) Sin Da-woon (2)	(Netherlands) Sjinkie Knegt (1) (Russia) Viktor Ahn (2)	(South Korea) Sin Da-woon (1) (Canada) Patrick Duffy (2)	
14 February 2015		1500m	(China) Han Tianyu	(China) Chen Dequan	(Russia) Viktor Ahn	
15 February 2015		5000m relay	China; Shi Jingnan; Wu Dajing; Chen Dequan; Han Tianyu	South Korea; Lee Jung-su; Sin Da-woon; Kwak Yoon-gy; Lee Han-bin	Netherlands; Daan Breeuwsma; Sjinkie Knegt; Adwin Snellink; Freek van der Wart	

=== Women ===
==== Salt Lake City 7–9 November 2014 ====
Date	Place	Distance	Winner	Second	Third	Reference
9 November 2014	Utah Olympic Oval	500m	(China) Fan Kexin	(Italy) Arianna Fontana	(Canada) Marianne St-Gelais	
8 November 2014; 9 November 2014	Utah Olympic Oval	1000m	(Canada) Marianne St-Gelais (1) (South Korea) Shim Suk-hee (2)	(South Korea) Choi Min-jeong (1) (South Korea) Kim A-lang (2)	(China) Fan Kexin (1) (Canada) Valérie Maltais (2)	
8 November 2014	Utah Olympic Oval	1500m	(South Korea) Shim Suk-hee	(South Korea) Kim A-lang	(Italy) Arianna Fontana	
9 November 2014	Utah Olympic Oval	3000m relay	South Korea; Jeon Ji-soo; Shim Suk-hee; Kim A-lang; Choi Min-jeong	China; Fan Kexin; Han Yutong; Lin Yue; Tao Jiaying	Canada; Valérie Maltais; Marianne St-Gelais; Kasandra Bradette; Kim Boutin	

==== Montreal 14–16 November 2014 ====
Date	Place	Distance	Winner	Second	Third	Reference
15 November 2014; 16 November 2014	Maurice Richard Arena	500m	(China) Fan Kexin (1) (Italy) Arianna Fontana (2)	(Canada) Marianne St-Gelais (1) (South Korea) Jeon Ji-soo (2)	(South Korea) Jeon Ji-soo (1) (China) Lin Yue (2)	
16 November 2014	Maurice Richard Arena	1000m	(South Korea) Shim Suk-hee	(South Korea) Choi Min-jeong	(China) Guo Yihan	
15 November 2014	Maurice Richard Arena	1500m	(South Korea) Choi Min-jeong	(Italy) Arianna Fontana	(South Korea) Shim Suk-hee	
16 November 2014	Maurice Richard Arena	3000m relay	South Korea; Jeon Ji-soo; Lee Eun-byul; Shim Suk-hee; Choi Min-jeong	Italy; Arianna Fontana; Lucia Peretti; Elena Viviani; Arianna Valcepina	Russia; Emina Malagich; Ekaterina Strelkova; Sofia Prosvirnova; Ekaterina Konstantinova	

==== Shanghai 12–14 December 2014 ====
Date	Place	Distance	Winner	Second	Third	Reference
13 December 2014; 14 December 2014	Shanghai Oriental Sports Center	500m	(China) Fan Kexin (1) (China) Li Hongshuang (2)	(Canada) Marianne St-Gelais (1) (China) Lin Yue (2)	(South Korea) Kim A-lang (1) (Canada) Kasandra Bradette (2)	
14 December 2014	Shanghai Oriental Sports Center	1000m	(South Korea) Choi Min-jeong	(South Korea) Shim Suk-hee	(Canada) Marianne St-Gelais	
13 December 2014	Shanghai Oriental Sports Center	1500m	(China) Han Yutong	(South Korea) Shim Suk-hee	(China) Li Hongshuang	
14 December 2014	Shanghai Oriental Sports Center	3000m relay	South Korea; Lee Eun-byul; Noh Do-hee; Kim A-lang; Choi Min-jeong	China; Fan Kexin; Han Yutong; Lin Yue; Li Hongshuang	Canada; Marianne St-Gelais; Kasandra Bradette; Kim Boutin; Joanie Gervais	

==== Seoul 19–21 December 2014 ====
Date	Place	Distance	Winner	Second	Third	Reference
21 December 2014	Mokdong Ice Rink	500m	(China) Fan Kexin	(South Korea) Jeon Ji-soo	(United Kingdom) Elise Christie	
20 December 2014	Mokdong Ice Rink	1000m	(China) Han Yutong	(Canada) Marianne St-Gelais	(United Kingdom) Elise Christie	
21 December 2014	Mokdong Ice Rink	1500m	(South Korea) Choi Min-jeong	(China) Han Yutong	(South Korea) Noh Do-hee	
20 December 2014	Mokdong Ice Rink	3000m	(South Korea) Choi Min-jeong	(China) Tao Jiaying	(South Korea) Lee Eun-byul	
21 December 2014	Mokdong Ice Rink	3000m relay	China; Fan Kexin; Han Yutong; Lin Yue; LI Hongshuang	South Korea; Jeon Ji-soo; Lee Eun-byul; Kim A-lang; Choi Min-jeong	Russia; Emina Malagich; Ekaterina Strelkova; Sofia Prosvirnova; Ekaterina Konstantinova	

==== Dresden 6–8 February 2015 ====
Date	Place	Distance	Winner	Second	Third	Reference
8 February 2015	EnergieVerbund Arena	500m	(Italy) Arianna Fontana	(United Kingdom) Elise Christie	(China) Fan Kexin	
7 February 2015	EnergieVerbund Arena	1000m	(South Korea) Kim A-lang	(China) Fan Kexin	(Canada) Marianne St-Gelais	
7 February 2015; 8 February 2015	EnergieVerbund Arena	1500m	(South Korea) Choi Min-jeong (1) (South Korea) Shim Suk-hee (2)	(South Korea) Noh Do-hee (1) (South Korea) Kim A-lang (2)	(Lithuania) Agnė Sereikaitė (1) (China) Tao Jiaying (2)	
8 February 2015	EnergieVerbund Arena	3000m relay	Canada; Marianne St-Gelais; Kim Boutin; Kasandra Bradette; Audrey Phaneuf	Italy; Arianna Fontana; Lucia Peretti; Elena Viviani; Arianna Valcepina	France; Tiffany Huot-Marchand; Aurélie Monvoisin; Louise Milesi; Veronique Pierron	

==== Erzurum 13–15 February 2015 ====
Date	Place	Distance	Winner	Second	Third	Reference
15 February 2015		500m	(China) Fan Kexin	(Russia) Sofia Prosvirnova	(United Kingdom) Elise Christie	
14 February 2015; 15 February 2015		1000m	(United Kingdom) Elise Christie (1) (Italy) Arianna Fontana (2)	(Canada) Kasandra Bradette (1) (Japan) Yui Sakai (2)	(South Korea) Shim Suk-hee (1) (Canada) Kim Boutin (2)	
14 February 2015		1500m	(Italy) Arianna Fontana	(Canada) Marianne St-Gelais	(Canada) Kim Boutin	
15 February 2015		3000m relay	China; Zhou Yang; Fan Kexin; Lin Yue; Tao Jiaying	South Korea; Jeon Ji-soo; Noh Do Hee; Shim Suk-hee; Choi Min-jeong	Canada; Marianne St-Gelais; Kasandra Bradette; Geneve Belanger; Kim Boutin	

== World Cup standings ==
=== Men's 500 metres ===
After 6 of 6 events

Pos	Athlete	Points
1.	Dmitry Migunov (RUS)	46078
2.	Wu Dajing (CHN)	36737
3.	Kwak Yoon-gy (KOR)	27977
4.	John-Henry Krueger (USA)	25742
5.	Viktor Knoch (HUN)	21178

=== Women's 500 metres ===
After 6 of 6 events

Pos	Athlete	Points
1.	Fan Kexin (CHN)	56400
2.	Jeon Ji-soo (KOR)	31714
3.	Marianne St-Gelais (CAN)	30581
4.	Elise Christie (GBR)	30016
5.	Lin Yue (CHN)	28858

=== Men's 1000 metres ===
After 6 of 6 events

Pos	Athlete	Points
1.	Semen Elistratov (RUS)	36000
2.	Sjinkie Knegt (NED)	35211
3.	Sin Da-woon (KOR)	33198
4.	Charles Hamelin (CAN)	24590
5.	Viktor Ahn (RUS)	21280

=== Women's 1000 metres ===
After 6 of 6 events

Pos	Athlete	Points
1.	Shim Suk-hee (KOR)	39745
2.	Marianne St-Gelais (CAN)	30800
3.	Choi Min-jeong (KOR)	29277
4.	Elise Christie (GBR)	29096
5.	Fan Kexin (CHN)	21423

=== Men's 1500 metres ===
After 6 of 6 events

Pos	Athlete	Points
1.	Sin Da-woon (KOR)	54400
2.	Chen Dequan (CHN)	27773
3.	Charles Hamelin (CAN)	24497
4.	Park Se-yeong (KOR)	24400
5.	Lee Jung-su (KOR)	21738

=== Women's 1500 metres ===
After 6 of 6 events

Pos	Athlete	Points
1.	Choi Min-jeong (KOR)	45898
2.	Shim Suk-hee (KOR)	34438
3.	Han Yutong (CHN)	28240
4.	Arianna Fontana (ITA)	27677
5.	Tao Jiaying (CHN)	23856

=== Men's 5000 metre relay ===
After 6 of 6 events

Pos	Athlete	Points
1.	Netherlands	34400
2.	South Korea	33120
3.	China	30800
4.	Hungary	22193
5.	Russia	20894

=== Women's 3000 metre relay ===
After 6 of 6 events

Pos	Athlete	Points
1.	South Korea	38000
2.	China	36000
3.	Canada	29200
4.	Italy	25216
5.	Russia	23040

=== Overall men's ===
After 6 of 6 events

Pos	Athlete	Points
1.	South Korea	52400
2.	China	42320
3.	Russia	41898
4.	Canada	35136
5.	Netherlands	23962

=== Overall women's ===
After 6 of 6 events

Pos	Athlete	Points
1.	China	52000
2.	South Korea	44752
3.	Canada	42320
4.	Italy	27758
5.	Russia	25805

== See also ==
- 2015 World Short Track Speed Skating Championships
