= 2013 World Junior Short Track Speed Skating Championships =

International speed skating competition

- The logo of the 2013 World Junior Short Track Speed Skating Championships
- Location: Warsaw, Poland
- Venue: Torwar Hall
- Dates: 22–24 February
- Competitors: 191 from 39 nations

The 2013 World Junior Short Track Speed Skating Championships took place from 22 to 24 February 2013 in Warsaw, Poland at the Torwar Hall. The World Championships are organised by the ISU which also run world cups and championships in speed skating and figure skating.

== Medal summary ==
=== Medal table ===
Rank	Nation	Gold	Silver	Bronze	Total
1	South Korea	7	4	3	14
2	China	3	4	3	10
3	Russia	0	1	1	2
4	Canada	0	1	0	1
5	Australia	0	0	1	1
5	Hungary	0	0	1	1
5	Japan	0	0	1	1
Totals (7 entries)		10	10	10	30

=== Men's events ===
The results of the Championships:

Event	Gold		Silver		Bronze	
Overall	Park Se-yeong; South Korea	102 pts	Han Tianyu; China	97 pts	Lee Hyo-been; South Korea	42 pts
500 metres	Park Se-yeong; South Korea	41.412 JWR	Han Tianyu; China	41.458	Kim Byung-joon; South Korea	42.375
1000 metres	Han Tianyu; China	1:28.592	Park Se-yeong; South Korea	1:28.695	Sándor Liu Shaolin; Hungary	1:30.278
1500 metres	Han Tianyu; China	2:35.255	Lee Hyo-been; South Korea	2:35.286	Park Se-yeong; South Korea	2:35.716
3000 metre relay	South Korea; Jung Ji-woong; Kim Byung-joon; Lee Hyo-been; Park Se-yeong	4:07.393	Canada; Alexander Fathoullin; Yoan Gauthier; David Goulet; William Preudhomme	4:08.585	Japan; Dan Iwasa; Kei Saito; Ryu Watanabe; Hiroki Yokoyama	4:09.834

=== Women's events ===
Event	Gold		Silver		Bronze	
Overall	Noh Do-hee; South Korea	89 pts	Kim A-lang; South Korea	63 pts	Han Yutong; China	52 pts
500 metres	Han Yutong; China	45.369	Xiao Han; China	45.502	Lin Yue; China	45.559
1000 metres	Kim A-lang; South Korea	1:33.784	Noh Do-hee; South Korea	1:34.051	Han Yutong; China	1:34.409
1500 metres	Noh Do-hee; South Korea	2:32.853	Evgeniya Zakharova; Russia	2:33.164	Deanna Lockett; Australia	2:33.214
3000 metre relay	South Korea; Ahn Se-jung; Kim A-lang; Kong Sang-jeong; Noh Do-hee	4:21.550	China; Han Yutong; Ji Xue; Lin Yue; Xiao Han	4:23.372	Russia; Emina Malagich; Sofia Prosvirnova; Ekaterina Strelkova; Evgeniya Zakharova	4:25.827

== Participating nations ==
191 athletes from 39 countries participated in these championships, which is an increase of eleven nations and 61 athletes from the last year's competition.

- Argentina (2)
- Australia (4)
- Austria (2)
- Belarus (8)
- Belgium (1)
- Bosnia and Herzegovina (6)
- Bulgaria (8)
- Canada (8)
- China (8)
- Chinese Taipei (5)
- Croatia (4)
- Czech Republic (4)
- France (8)
- Germany (6)
- Great Britain (4)
- Hong Kong (1)
- Hungary (5)
- India (4)
- Italy (8)
- Japan (8)
- Kazakhstan (8)
- Latvia (5)
- Lithuania (1)
- Malaysia (2)
- Mongolia (2)
- Netherlands (8)
- New Zealand (2)
- Poland (8)
- Romania (6)
- Russia (8)
- Serbia (1)
- Singapore (4)
- Slovakia (2)
- South Africa (1)
- South Korea (8)
- Thailand (1)
- Turkey (4)
- Ukraine (8)
- United States (8)

== See also ==
- Short track speed skating
- World Junior Short Track Speed Skating Championships
