= Short-track speed skating at the 2013 Winter Universiade =

Short track speed skating at the 2013 Winter Universiade was held at the Trento Ghiaccio Arena in Trento from December 18 to December 20, 2013.

== Men's events ==
Event	Gold		Silver		Bronze	
500 metres	Lee Hyo-Been; South Korea	41.642	Patrick Duffy; Canada	41.917	Shi Jingnan; China	42.025
1000 metres	Noh Jin-Kyu; South Korea	1:25.506	Um Cheon-Ho; South Korea	1:25.642	Guillaume Bastille; Canada	1:25.777
1500 metres	Noh Jin-Kyu; South Korea	2:16.810	Um Cheon-Ho; South Korea	2:16.852	Yoan Gauthier; Canada	2:17.742
5000 metres relay	Hungary (HUN); Bence Beres; Csaba Burjan; Viktor Knoch; Bence Olah	6:46.953	Canada (CAN); Guillaume Bastille; Patrick Duffy; Yoan Gauthier; Sebastien Landry	6:46.960	Russia (RUS); Dmitry Miasnikov; Dmitriy Migunov; Andrey Mikhasev; Eduard Strelkov	6:55.547

== Women's events ==
Event	Gold		Silver		Bronze	
500 metres	Wang Xue; China	44.713	Caroline Truchon; Canada	44.834	Agnė Sereikaitė; Lithuania	45.044
1000 metres	Guo Yihan; China	1:35.691	Lee Eun-byul; South Korea	1:36.161	Tao Jiaying; China	1:36.271
1500 metres	Tao Jiaying; China	2:30.296	Bernadett Heidum; Hungary	2:30.545	Hwang Hyun-Sun; South Korea	2:30.606
3000 metres relay	South Korea (KOR); Hwang Hyun-sun; Lee Eun-byul; Lee So-youn; Song Jae-won; Choi Ji-hyun*	4:15.946	Russia (RUS); Iullia Kichapova; Emina Malagich; Liya Stepanova; Evgeniya Zakharova	4:17.107	Hungary (HUN); Bernadett Heidum; Andrea Keszler; Zsófia Kónya; Szandra Lajtos	4:17.549

* Skaters who did not participate in the final, but received medals.
