= 2016 European Short Track Speed Skating Championships =

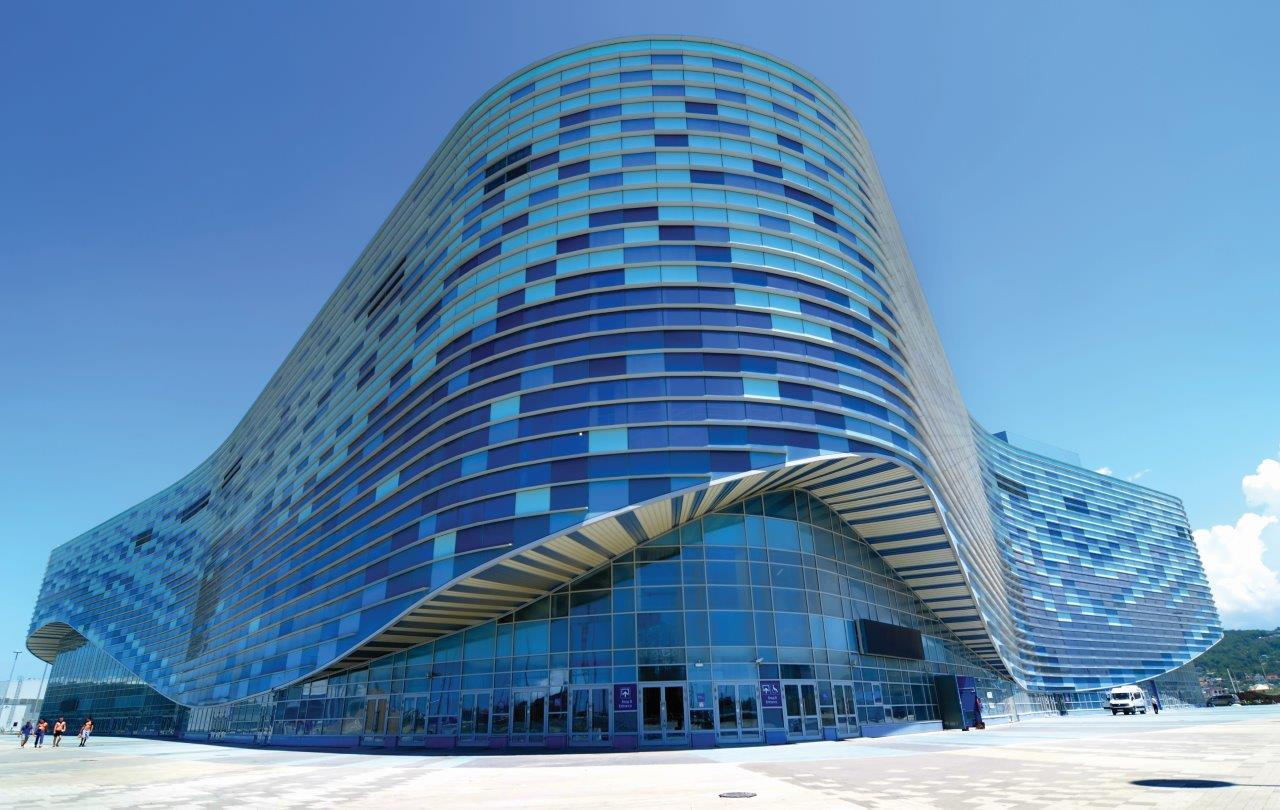
- Venue: Iceberg Skating Palace, Sochi, Russia
- Dates: 22–24 January
- Competitors: 130 from 25 nations

The 2016 European Short Track Speed Skating Championships took place between 22 and 24 January 2016 in Sochi, Russia.

== Medal summary ==
=== Medal table ===
* Host nation (Russia)

Rank	Nation	Gold	Silver	Bronze	Total
1	Great Britain (GBR)	4	1	1	6
2	Netherlands (NED)	3	3	3	9
3	Russia (RUS)*	3	2	2	7
4	Hungary (HUN)	0	4	0	4
5	France (FRA)	0	0	2	2
6	Germany (GER)	0	0	1	1
6	Italy (ITA)	0	0	1	1
Totals (7 entries)		10	10	10	30

=== Men's events ===
The results of the Championships:

Event	Gold		Silver		Bronze	
500 metres	Sjinkie Knegt (NED)	41.920	Semen Elistratov (RUS)	42.005	Dmitry Migunov (RUS)	42.645
1000 metres	Semen Elistratov (RUS)	1:33.000	Sándor Liu Shaolin (HUN)	1:33.060	Dmitry Migunov (RUS)	1:33.067
1500 metres	Semen Elistratov (RUS)	2:24.034	Sándor Liu Shaolin (HUN)	2:24.463	Freek van der Wart (NED)	2:24.601
5000 metre relay	Netherlands; Daan Breeuwsma; Sjinkie Knegt; Freek van der Wart; Dennis Visser; Adwin Snellink	7:12.495	Hungary; Csaba Burján; Viktor Knoch; Shaoang Liu; Shaolin Sándor Liu; Bence Oláh	7:12.634	Great Britain; Josh Cheetham; Richard Shoebridge; Paul Stanley; Jack Whelbourne	7:17.390
Overall Classification	Semen Elistratov (RUS)	91 pts.	Sándor Liu Shaolin (HUN)	50 pts.	Vincent Jeanne (FRA)	44 pts.

=== Women's events ===
Event	Gold		Silver		Bronze	
500 metres	Elise Christie (GBR)	43.923	Lara van Ruijven (NED)	45.106	Veronique Pierron (FRA)	45.492
1000 metres	Elise Christie (GBR)	1:33.285	Suzanne Schulting (NED)	1:33.347	Anna Seidel (GER)	1:33.440
1500 metres	Elise Christie (GBR)	2:39.510	Jorien ter Mors (NED)	2:39.591	Suzanne Schulting (NED)	2:39.662
3000 metre relay	Netherlands; Suzanne Schulting; Jorien ter Mors; Yara van Kerkhof; Lara van Ruijven; Rianne de Vries	4:12.556	Russia; Ekaterina Konstantinova; Emina Malagich; Ekaterina Strelkova; Evgeniya Zakharova; Tatiana Borodulina	4:14.949	Italy; Cecilia Maffei; Lucia Peretti; Arianna Valcepina; Elena Viviani; Federica Tombolato	4:15.219
Overall Classification	Elise Christie (GBR)	112 pts.	Charlotte Gilmartin (GBR)	47 pts.	Suzanne Schulting (NED)	42 pts.

== Participating nations ==
- Austria
- Belgium
- Belarus
- Bosnia and Herzegovina
- Bulgaria
- Croatia
- Czech Republic
- France
- Germany
- Great Britain
- Hungary
- Italy
- Latvia
- Netherlands
- Norway
- Poland
- Russia
- Serbia
- Slovakia
- Slovenia
- Spain
- Sweden
- Switzerland
- Turkey
- Ukraine

== See also ==
- Short track speed skating
- European Short Track Speed Skating Championships
