= 2015 European Short Track Speed Skating Championships =

- Venue: Sportboulevard Dordrecht, Dordrecht, Netherlands
- Dates: 23–25 January
- from 28 nations

The 2015 European Short Track Speed Skating Championships took place between 23 and 25 January 2015 in Dordrecht, the Netherlands.

== Medal summary ==
=== Medal table ===
* Host nation (Netherlands)

Rank	Nation	Gold	Silver	Bronze	Total
1	Russia (RUS)	4	5	3	12
2	Netherlands (NED)*	3	3	2	8
3	Great Britain (GBR)	3	0	0	3
4	Hungary (HUN)	0	1	1	2
5	Italy (ITA)	0	1	0	1
6	Poland (POL)	0	0	2	2
7	France (FRA)	0	0	1	1
7	Lithuania (LTU)	0	0	1	1
Totals (8 entries)		10	10	10	30

=== Men's events ===
The results of the Championships:

Event	Gold		Silver		Bronze	
500 metres	Victor An (RUS)	41.780	Sjinkie Knegt (NED)	41.834	Semen Elistratov (RUS)	41.935
1000 metres	Sjinkie Knegt (NED)	1:27.775	Freek van der Wart (NED)	1:27.936	Semen Elistratov (RUS)	1:28.245
1500 metres	Sjinkie Knegt (NED)	2:20.320	Semen Elistratov (RUS)	2:20.351	Daan Breeuwsma (NED)	2:20.580
5000 metre relay	Russia; Victor An; Semion Elistratov; Vladimir Grigorev; Dmitry Migunov; Ruslan Zakharov	7:04.153	Hungary; Csaba Burján; Viktor Knoch; Shaoang Liu; Shaolin Sándor Liu; Bence Béres	7:04.492	Netherlands; Daan Breeuwsma; Itzhak de Laat; Sjinkie Knegt; Freek van der Wart; Adwin Snellink	7:04.850
Overall Classification	Sjinkie Knegt (NED)	97 pts.	Victor An (RUS)	71 pts.	Semen Elistratov (RUS)	60 pts.

=== Women's events ===
Event	Gold		Silver		Bronze	
500 metres	Elise Christie (GBR)	43.295	Sofia Prosvirnova (RUS)	43.381	Patrycja Maliszewska (POL)	43.571
1000 metres	Sofia Prosvirnova (RUS)	1:35.39	Arianna Fontana (ITA)	1:35.536	Agnė Sereikaitė (LTU)	1:35.758
1500 metres	Elise Christie (GBR)	2:42.939	Sofia Prosvirnova (RUS)	2:43.097	Veronique Pierron (FRA)	2:43.207
3000 metre relay	Russia; Ekaterina Konstantinova; Emina Malagich; Sofia Prosvirnova; Ekaterina Strelkova; Evgeniya Zakharova	4:18.084	Netherlands; Rianne de Vries; Suzanne Schulting; Yara van Kerkhof; Lara van Ruijven	4:18.174	Hungary; Sára Bácskai; Bernadett Heidum; Petra Jászapáti; Szandra Lajtos	4:18.658
Overall Classification	Elise Christie (GBR)	89 pts.	Sofia Prosvirnova (RUS)	79 pts.	Patrycja Maliszewska (POL)	52 pts.

== Participating nations ==
- Austria
- Belgium
- Belarus
- Bosnia and Herzegovina
- Bulgaria
- Croatia
- Czech Republic
- Denmark
- France
- Germany
- Great Britain
- Hungary
- Israel
- Italy
- Latvia
- Lithuania
- Luxembourg
- Netherlands
- Norway
- Poland
- Russia
- Serbia
- Slovakia
- Spain
- Sweden
- Switzerland
- Turkey
- Ukraine

== See also ==
- Short track speed skating
- European Short Track Speed Skating Championships
