= Short-track speed skating at the 2017 Asian Winter Games – Women's 3000 metre relay =

Women's 3000 metre relay at the 2017 Asian Winter Games
- Venue: Makomanai Ice Arena
- Dates: 21–22 February 2017
- Competitors: 24 from 5 nations

Medalists
gold medal	South Korea; Shim Suk-hee, Choi Min-jeong, Noh Do-hee, Kim Ji-yoo, Kim Geon-hee
silver medal	China; Fan Kexin, Qu Chunyu, Zang Yize, Guo Yihan, Lin Yue
bronze medal	Kazakhstan; Kim Iong-a, Anastassiya Krestova, Madina Zhanbussinova, Anita Nagay, Olga Tikhonova

The women's 3000 metre relay at the 2017 Asian Winter Games was held from February 21 to February 22, 2017 in Sapporo, Japan.

== Schedule ==
All times are Japan Standard Time (UTC+09:00)

Date	Time	Event
Tuesday, 21 February 2017	15:49	Heats
Wednesday, 22 February 2017	15:18	Final

== Results ==
=== Heats ===
- Qualification: 1 + Next two best → Final (Q + q)

==== Heat 1 ====
Rank	Team	Time	Notes
1	South Korea (KOR); Noh Do-hee; Kim Ji-yoo; Kim Geon-hee; Shim Suk-hee	4:16.041	Q
2	Kazakhstan (KAZ); Kim Iong-a; Anastassiya Krestova; Madina Zhanbussinova; Olga Tikhonova	4:22.412	q
3	Chinese Taipei (TPE); Lu Chia-tung; Lin Yu-tzu; Yang Zih-shian; Wang Kuan-ming	4:49.901	

==== Heat 2 ====
Rank	Team	Time	Notes
1	Japan (JPN); Sumire Kikuchi; Hitomi Saito; Moemi Kikuchi; Aoi Watanabe	4:13.389	Q
2	China (CHN); Zang Yize; Fan Kexin; Qu Chunyu; Lin Yue	4:19.997	q

=== Final ===
Rank	Team	Time
1st place, gold medalist(s)	South Korea (KOR); Shim Suk-hee; Choi Min-jeong; Noh Do-hee; Kim Ji-yoo	4:10.515
2nd place, silver medalist(s)	China (CHN); Fan Kexin; Qu Chunyu; Zang Yize; Guo Yihan	4:10.980
3rd place, bronze medalist(s)	Kazakhstan (KAZ); Kim Iong-a; Anastassiya Krestova; Madina Zhanbussinova; Anita Nagay	4:20.034
4	Japan (JPN); Ayuko Ito; Hitomi Saito; Sumire Kikuchi; Moemi Kikuchi	4:22.464
