= 2019 World Short Track Speed Skating Championships =

Speed skating event in Sofia, Bulgaria

- Venue: Arena Armeec
- Location: Sofia, Bulgaria
- Dates: 8–10 March

The 2019 World Short Track Speed Skating Championships were held in Sofia, Bulgaria from 8 to 10 March 2019.

== Schedule ==
All times are local (UTC+2).

Date	Time	Event
8 March	10:00	Qualifying
9 March	14:02	1500 m women
9 March	14:02	1500 m men
9 March	14:02	500 m women
9 March	14:02	500 m men
10 March	14:02	1000 m women
10 March	14:02	1000 m men
10 March	14:02	3000 m women
10 March	14:02	3000 m men
10 March	14:02	3000 m relay women
10 March	14:02	5000 m relay men

== Medal summary ==
=== Medals table ===
Rank	Nation	Gold	Silver	Bronze	Total
1	South Korea (KOR)	7	4	1	12
2	Netherlands (NED)	3	0	1	4
3	China (CHN)	0	3	1	4
4	Canada (CAN)	0	2	3	5
5	Russia (RUS)	0	1	3	4
6	Hungary (HUN)	0	0	1	1
Totals (6 entries)		10	10	10	30

=== Men ===
Event	Gold		Silver		Bronze	
Overall	Lim Hyo-jun; South Korea	102 pts	Hwang Dae-heon; South Korea	55 pts	Semion Elistratov; Russia	44 pts
500 m	Hwang Dae-heon; South Korea	42.490	Wu Dajing; China	42.725	Ren Ziwei; China	42.888
1000 m	Lim Hyo-jun; South Korea	1:26.468	Hwang Dae-heon; South Korea	1:26.657	Semion Elistratov; Russia	1:26.660
1500 m	Lim Hyo-jun; South Korea	2:31.632	Samuel Girard; Canada	2:31.685	Lee June-seo; South Korea	2:31.717
5000 m relay	South Korea; Hwang Dae-heon; Lee June-seo; Lim Hyo-jun; Park Ji-won; Hong Kyung-hwan	7:04.292	China; Ren Ziwei; Wu Dajing; Xu Hongzhi; Yang Shuai; Sun Long	7:04.651	Hungary; Csaba Burján; Cole Krueger; Shaolin Sándor Liu; Alex Varnyú	7:04.961

=== Women ===
Event	Gold		Silver		Bronze	
Overall	Suzanne Schulting; Netherlands	81 pts	Choi Min-jeong; South Korea	76 pts	Kim Boutin; Canada	37 pts
500 m	Lara van Ruijven; Netherlands	43.267	Fan Kexin; China	43.427	Suzanne Schulting; Netherlands	43.518
1000 m	Suzanne Schulting; Netherlands	1:28.986	Choi Min-jeong; South Korea	1:29.187	Kim Boutin; Canada	1:29.211
1500 m	Choi Min-jeong; South Korea	2:29.741	Kim Boutin; Canada	2:29.803	Sofia Prosvirnova; Russia	2:29.843
3000 m relay	South Korea; Choi Min-jeong; Kim Geon-hee; Kim Ji-yoo; Shim Suk-hee; Choi Ji-hyun	4:13.904	Russia; Ekaterina Efremenkova; Ekaterina Konstantinova; Emina Malagich; Sofia Prosvirnova	4:14.353	Canada; Kim Boutin; Camille de Serres-Rainville; Alyson Charles; Courtney Sarault; Kasandra Bradette	4:14.984
