= Han Tianyu =

Chinese short track speed skater

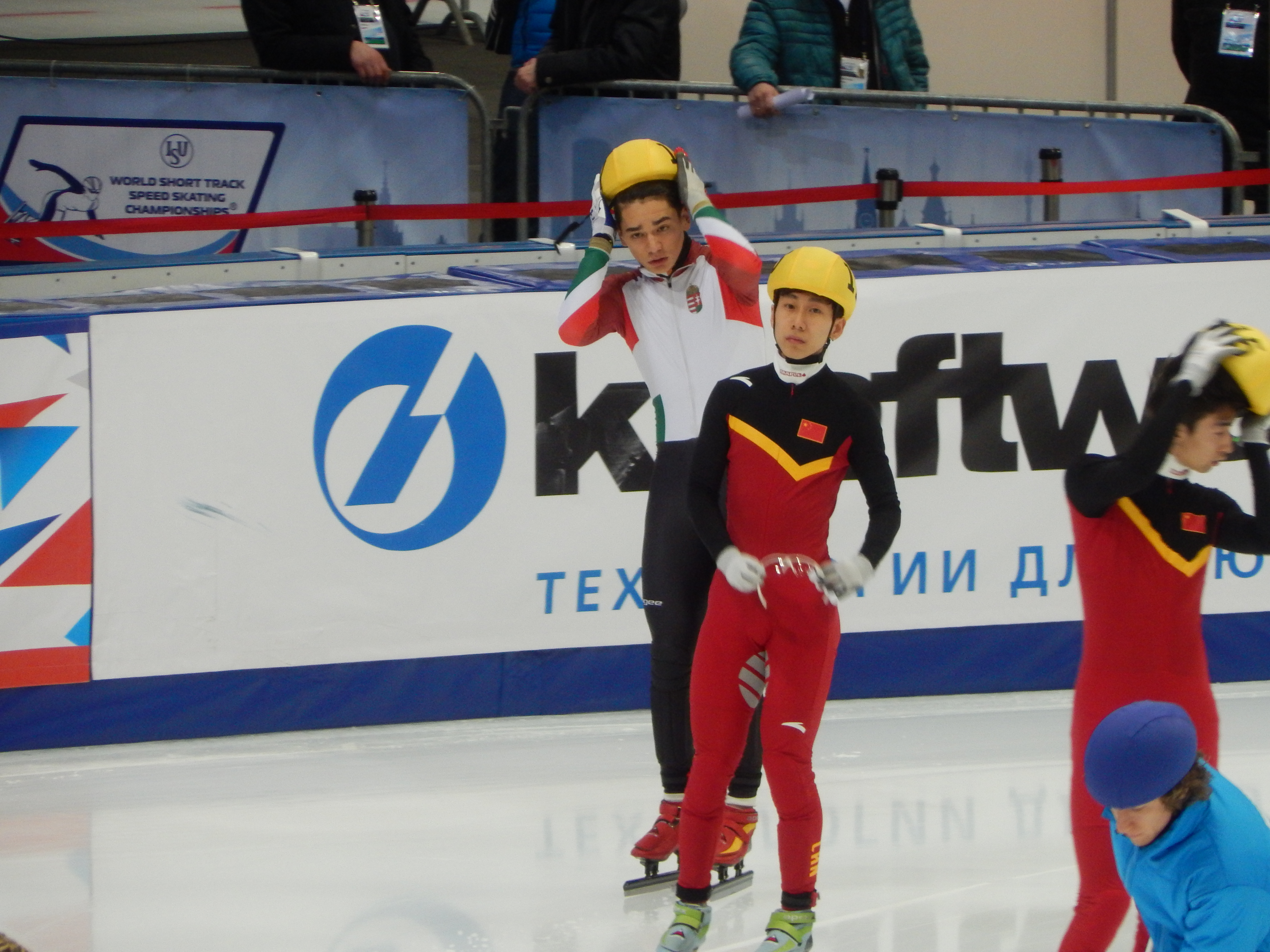

Personal information
- Born: 3 June 1996 (age 30) Fushun, Liaoning, China
- Height: 1.73 m (5 ft 8 in)
- Weight: 65 kg (143 lb)

Sport
- Country: China
- Sport: Short track speed skating
- Coached by: Li Yan (National Team Coach)

Achievements and titles
- Personal bests: 500m: 40.419 (2016); 1000m: 1:24.490 (2014); 1500m: 2:10.395 (2016); 3000m: 4:49.450 (2016)
Medal record
Olympic Games
Silver medal – second place	2014 Sochi	1500 m
Silver medal – second place	2018 Pyeongchang	5000 m relay
Bronze medal – third place	2014 Sochi	5000 m relay
World Championships
Gold medal – first place	2015 Moscow	5000 m relay
Gold medal – first place	2016 Seoul	Overall
Gold medal – first place	2016 Seoul	1500 m
Gold medal – first place	2016 Seoul	3000 m
Gold medal – first place	2016 Seoul	5000 m relay
Silver medal – second place	2014 Montreal	1500 m
Silver medal – second place	2017 Rotterdam	5000 m relay
Bronze medal – third place	2015 Moscow	500 m
Asian Winter Games
Gold medal – first place	2017 Sapporo	5000 m relay
World Junior Championships
Gold medal – first place	2012 Melbourne	Super 1500 m
Gold medal – first place	2013 Warsaw	1500 m
Gold medal – first place	2013 Warsaw	1000 m
Silver medal – second place	2012 Melbourne	500 m
Silver medal – second place	2012 Melbourne	3000m relay
Silver medal – second place	2013 Warsaw	500 m
Silver medal – second place	2013 Warsaw	Overall
Bronze medal – third place	2012 Melbourne	Overall
Asian Winter Games
Gold medal – first place	2017 Sapporo	5000m relay

Han Tianyu
- Simplified Chinese: 韩天宇
- Traditional Chinese: 韓天宇
Transcriptions
Standard Mandarin
- Hanyu Pinyin: =Hán Tiānyǔ
- IPA: [xǎn tʰjɛ́n ỳ]

Han Tianyu (born 3 June 1996) is a Chinese short-track speed-skater. He won the silver medal in men's 1500 metres short track speed skating at the 2014 Winter Olympics, behind the Canadian skater Charles Hamelin, who won the gold medal. Han also won medals in the 5000 m relay event at the 2014 and 2018 Winter Olympics.

== Early life ==
In 2002, Tianyu started to practice roller skating when he was only six years old. He was very talented in skating and won 8 national champions and 5 provincial champions during 2002 to 2006. In 2006, 10-year-old Tianyu decided to learn and practice short track speed skating. While there was no professional short track team in Liaoning Province at that time, he went to Changchun, Jilin and started his short track training.

== Career ==
Han Tianyu made his international debut in 2012 World Junior Short Track Speed Skating Championships, Melbourne, where he finished first in super 1500 meters, as well as a silver medal in 500 meters. Finally, he won a bronze medal in the overall ranking. After that competition, he was selected as a Chinese national team skater.

He started to compete in world cups in the 2012–2013 season. He also competed in 2013 World Junior Short Track Speed Skating Championships one year later in Warsaw, Poland. During that championships, he won 2 gold and a silver in single distances and ranked 2nd in the overall ranking. During the ISU competitions in 2013–2014 season, he showed a lot of improvements and was selected as a competitor in 2014 winter olympic games in Sochi.

On 10 February 2014, Han went on the ice for men's 1500 meters in Winter Olympic Game. He was in the same heat with superstar Victor An and world junior champion in 2013 Park Se-yeong, in both quarterfinals and semifinals. He made a second and a first in the two races and got the chance to be in the final race. In the final race, he stayed in top three during the whole race and in the last few laps still tried to challenge Charles Hamelin, who won the gold medal in the end. Tianyu finished second and Victor got the bronze medal.

On March 12, 2016, Han Tianyu won men's 1500 meters gold medal in World Short Track Speed Skating Championships held in Seoul, which made him the first male Chinese skater to win gold medal in World Championships in 1500m. On 13th, he finished first in the men's 3000 meters superfinal, and won the gold medal of men's overall classification. Han became the second skater who won World Championships Men's overall gold medal in Chinese history (after Li Jiajun).

== International Competition Podiums ==
Date	Competition	Location	Rank	Event	Result
25 Feb 2012	2012 World Junior Championships, Melbourne	(Australia) Medibank Icehouse	Silver medal	500 m	42.308
25 Feb 2012	2012 World Junior Championships, Melbourne	(Australia) Medibank Icehouse	Gold medal	1500 m Super Final	2:38.889
25 Feb 2012	2012 World Junior Championships, Melbourne	(Australia) Medibank Icehouse	Silver medal	3000 m relay	4:02.922
25 Feb 2012	2012 World Junior Championships, Melbourne	(Australia) Medibank Icehouse	Bronze medal	Overall	63 Points
28 Oct 2012	2012–13 ISU World Cup, Montreal	(Canada) Maurice Richard Arena	2nd place, silver medalist(s)	5000 m relay	6:45.864
2 Dec 2012	2012–13 ISU World Cup, Nagoya	(Japan) Nippon Gaishi Hall	3rd place, bronze medalist(s)	5000 m relay	6:47.885
3 Feb 2013	2012–13 ISU World Cup, Sochi	(Russia) Iceberg Skating Palace	3rd place, bronze medalist(s)	5000 m relay	6:49.925
22 Feb 2013	2013 World Junior Championships, Warsaw	(Poland) Torwar Hall	Gold medal	1500 m	2:35.255
23 Feb 2013	2013 World Junior Championships, Warsaw	(Poland) Torwar Hall	Silver medal	500 m	41.458
24 Feb 2013	2013 World Junior Championships, Warsaw	(Poland) Torwar Hall	Gold medal	1000 m	1:28.592
24 Feb 2013	2013 World Junior Championships, Warsaw	(Poland) Torwar Hall	Silver medal	Overall	97 Points
10 Feb 2014	2014 Winter Olympics, Sochi	(Russia) Iceberg Skating Palace	Silver medal	1500 m	2:15.055
21 Feb 2014	2014 Winter Olympics, Sochi	(Russia) Iceberg Skating Palace	Bronze medal	5000 m relay	6:48.341
14 Mar 2014	2014 World Championships, Montreal	(Canada) Maurice Richard Arena	Silver medal	1500 m	2:15.138
9 Nov 2014	2014–15 ISU World Cup, Salt Lake City	(United States) Utah Olympic Oval	2nd place, silver medalist(s)	5000 m relay	6:39.715
8 Feb 2015	2014–15 ISU World Cup, Dresden	(Germany) EnergieVerbund Arena	3rd place, bronze medalist(s)	5000 m relay	6:55.225
14 Feb 2015	2014–15 ISU World Cup, Erzurum	(Turkey) Palandöken Ice Skating Hall	1st place, gold medalist(s)	1500 m	2:13.354
15 Feb 2015	2014–15 ISU World Cup, Erzurum	(Turkey) Palandöken Ice Skating Hall	1st place, gold medalist(s)	5000 m relay	6:50.822
14 Mar 2015	2015 World Championships, Moscow	(Russia) Ice Palace Krylatskoye	Bronze medal	500 m	41.202
15 Mar 2015	2015 World Championships, Moscow	(Russia) Ice Palace Krylatskoye	Gold medal	5000 m relay	6:55.980
22 Feb 2018	2018 Winter Olympics, Pyeongchang	(South Korea) Gangneung Ice Arena	Silver medal	5000 m relay	6:32.035
