= 2017 World Short Track Speed Skating Championships =

International speed skating competition

- Venue: Rotterdam Ahoy, Rotterdam, Netherlands
- Dates: 10–12 March

Medalist men
1st place, gold medalist(s)		Seo Yi-ra	South Korea
2nd place, silver medalist(s)		Sjinkie Knegt	Netherlands
3rd place, bronze medalist(s)		Samuel Girard	Canada

Medalist women
1st place, gold medalist(s)		Elise Christie	Great Britain
2nd place, silver medalist(s)		Marianne St-Gelais	Canada
3rd place, bronze medalist(s)		Shim Suk-hee	South Korea

The 2017 World Short Track Speed Skating Championships took place from 10 to 12 March 2017 in Rotterdam, Netherlands and were the 42nd World Short Track Speed Skating Championships.

== Medal summary ==
=== Medal table ===
* Host nation (Netherlands)

Rank	Nation	Gold	Silver	Bronze	Total
1	South Korea (KOR)	3	0	5	8
2	Great Britain (GBR)	3	0	0	3
3	China (CHN)	2	2	0	4
4	Netherlands (NED)*	2	1	1	4
5	Canada (CAN)	0	5	2	7
6	Hungary (HUN)	0	2	1	3
7	Japan (JPN)	0	0	1	1
Totals (7 entries)		10	10	10	30

=== Men ===
Event	Gold		Silver		Bronze	
Overall	Seo Yi-ra; South Korea	81 pts	Sjinkie Knegt; Netherlands	73 pts	Samuel Girard; Canada	37 pts
500 m	Sjinkie Knegt; Netherlands	41.832	Wu Dajing; China	41.891	Seo Yi-ra; South Korea	42.036
1000 m	Seo Yi-ra; South Korea	1:25.550	Liu Shaoang; Hungary	1:25.732	Charles Hamelin; Canada	1:25.829
1500 m	Sin Da-woon; South Korea	2:16.919	Samuel Girard; Canada	2:16.982	Seo Yi-ra; South Korea	2:17.051
5000 m relay	Netherlands; Daan Breeuwsma; Sjinkie Knegt; Itzhak de Laat; Dennis Visser	7:06.826	China; Wu Dajing; Xu Hongzhi; Han Tianyu; Ren Ziwei	7:07.523	Hungary; Viktor Knoch; Csaba Burján; Sándor Liu Shaolin; Liu Shaoang	7:07.544

=== Women ===
Event	Gold		Silver		Bronze	
Overall	Elise Christie; Great Britain	89 pts	Marianne St-Gelais; Canada	68 pts	Shim Suk-hee; South Korea	52 pts
500 m	Fan Kexin; China	43.605	Marianne St-Gelais; Canada	43.630	Kim Ji-yoo; South Korea	43.744
1000 m	Elise Christie; Great Britain	1:30.818	Marianne St-Gelais; Canada	1:31.145	Suzanne Schulting; Netherlands	1:31.597
1500 m	Elise Christie; Great Britain	2:54.369	Marianne St-Gelais; Canada	2:54.381	Shim Suk-hee; South Korea	2:54.424
3000 m relay	China; Fan Kexin; Guo Yihan; Lin Yue; Zang Yize; Qu Chunyu	4:14.058	Hungary; Bernadett Heidum; Andrea Keszler; Sára Bácskai; Petra Jászapáti	4:14.627	Japan; Ayuko Ito; Hitomi Saito; Sumire Kikuchi; Aoi Watanabe; Moemi Kikuchi	4:16.668
