= Camille de Serres-Rainville =

Canadian speed skater (born 1995)

Personal information
- Born: August 24, 1995 (age 31) Montreal, Quebec, Canada

Sport
- Country: Canada
- Sport: Short track speed skating
- Events: 500 m, 1000 m, 1500 m
- Club: CPV Pointe-aux-Trembles
Medal record
World Championships
Bronze medal – third place	2019 Sofia	3000 m relay

Camille de Serres-Rainville (born August 24, 1995) is a Canadian short track speed skater.

She participated at the 2019 World Short Track Speed Skating Championships, winning a medal.
