= 2018 World Short Track Speed Skating Championships =

International speed skating competition

- Venue: Maurice Richard Arena, Montreal, Canada
- Dates: 16–18 March
- Competitors: 92 from 37 nations

Medalist men
1st place, gold medalist(s)		Charles Hamelin	Canada
2nd place, silver medalist(s)		Shaolin Sándor Liu	Hungary
3rd place, bronze medalist(s)		Hwang Dae-heon	South Korea

Medalist women
1st place, gold medalist(s)		Choi Min-jeong	South Korea
2nd place, silver medalist(s)		Shim Suk-hee	South Korea
3rd place, bronze medalist(s)		Li Jinyu	China

The 2018 World Short Track Speed Skating Championships were the 43rd World Short Track Speed Skating Championships and held from 16 to 18 March 2018 in Montreal, Canada.

== Medal summary ==
=== Medal table ===
* Host nation (Canada)

Rank	Nation	Gold	Silver	Bronze	Total
1	South Korea (KOR)	7	4	1	12
2	Canada (CAN)*	3	1	2	6
3	China (CHN)	0	1	3	4
4	Russia (RUS)	0	1	2	3
5	Netherlands (NED)	0	1	1	2
6	Hungary (HUN)	0	1	0	1
6	Poland (POL)	0	1	0	1
8	Japan (JPN)	0	0	1	1
Totals (8 entries)		10	10	10	30

=== Men ===
Event	Gold		Silver		Bronze	
Overall	Charles Hamelin; Canada	81 pts	Shaolin Sándor Liu; Hungary	45 pts	Hwang Dae-heon; South Korea	44 pts
500 m	Hwang Dae-heon; South Korea	40.742	Ren Ziwei; China	40.805	Semion Elistratov; Russia	40.827
1000 m	Charles Hamelin; Canada	1:22.249	Lim Hyo-jun; South Korea	1:22.283	Sjinkie Knegt; Netherlands	1:22.413
1500 m	Charles Hamelin; Canada	2:12.982	Lim Hyo-jun; South Korea	2:13.157	Semion Elistratov; Russia	2:13.312
5000 m relay	South Korea; Hwang Dae-heon; Kim Do-kyoum; Kwak Yoon-gy; Lim Hyo-jun; Seo Yi-ra	6:44.267	Canada; Charle Cournoyer; Pascal Dion; Samuel Girard; Charles Hamelin	6:44.434	Japan; Ryosuke Sakazume; Kazuki Yoshinaga; Keita Watanabe; Hiroki Yokoyama	6:44.587

=== Women ===
Event	Gold		Silver		Bronze	
Overall	Choi Min-jeong; South Korea	110 pts	Shim Suk-hee; South Korea	63 pts	Li Jinyu; China	39 pts
500 m	Choi Min-jeong; South Korea	42.845	Natalia Maliszewska; Poland	43.441	Qu Chunyu; China	43.527
1000 m	Shim Suk-hee; South Korea	1:29.316	Sofia Prosvirnova; Russia	1:29.352	Li Jinyu; China	1:29.580
1500 m	Choi Min-jeong; South Korea	2:23.351	Shim Suk-hee; South Korea	2:23.468	Kim Boutin; Canada	2:23.592
3000 m relay	South Korea; Choi Min-jeong; Kim A-lang; Kim Ye-jin; Shim Suk-hee; Lee Yu-bin	4:07.569	Netherlands; Suzanne Schulting; Yara van Kerkhof; Lara van Ruijven; Rianne de Vries	4:09.054	Canada; Kim Boutin; Kasandra Bradette; Valérie Maltais; Marianne St-Gelais; Jamie Macdonald	4:09.198
