= 2015 World Short Track Speed Skating Championships =

International speed skating competition

- Venue: Moscow, Russia
- Dates: 13–15 March 2015

Medalist men
| 1st place, gold medalist(s) | | Sjinkie Knegt | NED |
| 2nd place, silver medalist(s) | | Park Se-yeong | KOR |
| 3rd place, bronze medalist(s) | | Wu Dajing | CHN |

Medalist women
| 1st place, gold medalist(s) | | Choi Min-jeong | KOR |
| 2nd place, silver medalist(s) | | Arianna Fontana | ITA |
| 3rd place, bronze medalist(s) | | Shim Suk-hee | KOR |

The 2015 World Short Track Speed Skating Championships took place from 13 to 15 March 2015 in Moscow, Russia. They were the 40th World Short Track Speed Skating Championships.

== Medal table ==
* Host nation (Russia)

| Rank | Nation | Gold | Silver | Bronze | Total |
|---|---|---|---|---|---|
| 1 | South Korea (KOR) | 4 | 2 | 2 | 8 |
| 2 | China (CHN) | 3 | 1 | 3 | 7 |
| 3 | Italy (ITA) | 1 | 1 | 3 | 5 |
| 4 | Netherlands (NED) | 1 | 1 | 1 | 3 |
| 5 | Russia (RUS)* | 1 | 0 | 0 | 1 |
| 6 | Great Britain (GBR) | 0 | 2 | 0 | 2 |
| 6 | Hungary (HUN) | 0 | 2 | 0 | 2 |
| 8 | Canada (CAN) | 0 | 1 | 1 | 2 |
| Totals (8 entries) | | 10 | 10 | 10 | 30 |

== Medalists ==
* Skaters who did not participate in the final, but received medals.

=== Men ===
| Event | Gold | | Silver | | Bronze | |
|---|---|---|---|---|---|---|
| Overall | Sjinkie Knegt; Netherlands | 63 pts | Park Se-yeong; South Korea | 63 pts | Wu Dajing; China | 55 pts |
| 500 m | Wu Dajing; China | 41.032 | Sándor Liu Shaolin; Hungary | 41.133 | Han Tianyu; China | 41.133 |
| 1000 m | Park Se-yeong; South Korea | 1:25.155 | Charles Hamelin; Canada | 1:25.189 | Shi Jingnan; China | 1:25.225 |
| 1500 m | Semion Elistratov; Russia | 2:18.096 | Sjinkie Knegt; Netherlands | 2:18.104 | Charles Hamelin; Canada | 2:18.117 |
| 5000 m relay | China; Wu Dajing; Chen Dequan; Xu Hongzhi; Han Tianyu; Shi Jingnan* | 6:55.228 | Hungary; Viktor Knoch; Csaba Burján; Sándor Liu Shaolin; Liu Shaoang | 6:56.024 | Netherlands; Daan Breeuwsma; Freek van der Wart; Sjinkie Knegt; Mark Prinsen | 6:56.321 |

=== Women ===
| Event | Gold | | Silver | | Bronze | |
|---|---|---|---|---|---|---|
| Overall | Choi Min-jeong; South Korea | 89 pts | Arianna Fontana; Italy | 68 pts | Shim Suk-hee; South Korea | 47 pts |
| 500 m | Fan Kexin; China | 43.866 | Elise Christie; Great Britain | 44.139 | Arianna Fontana; Italy | 55.723 |
| 1000 m | Choi Min-jeong; South Korea | 1:32.730 | Elise Christie; Great Britain | 1:32.782 | Arianna Fontana; Italy | 1:32.903 |
| 1500 m | Arianna Fontana; Italy | 2:31.392 | Shim Suk-hee; South Korea | 2:31.472 | Choi Min-jeong; South Korea | 2:31.502 |
| 3000 m relay | South Korea; Noh Do-hee; Shim Suk-hee; Kim A-lang; Choi Min-jeong; Jeon Ji-soo* | 4:18.550 | China; Fan Kexin; Han Yutong; Lin Yue; Tao Jiaying; Zhou Yang* | 4:18.595 | Italy; Arianna Fontana; Lucia Peretti; Elena Viviani; Arianna Valcepina | 4:20.916 |
