= Chen Dequan =

Chinese short track speed skater

Personal information
- Born: 30 August 1995 (age 30) Fushun, Liaoning, China
- Height: 1.76 m (5 ft 9 in)
- Weight: 66 kg (146 lb)

Sport
- Country: China
- Sport: Short track speed skating
- Coached by: Li Yan (National Team Coach)

Achievements and titles
- Personal best(s): 500m: 41.727 (2012); 1000m: 1:25.054 (2012); 1500m: 2:15.263 (2012)
Medal record
Men's short track speed skating
Representing China
Olympic Games
Silver medal – second place	2018 Pyeongchang	5000 m relay
Bronze medal – third place	2014 Sochi	5000 m relay
World Championships
Gold medal – first place	2015 Moscow	5000 m relay
World Junior Championships
Silver medal – second place	2012 Melbourne	1000 m
Silver medal – second place	2012 Melbourne	3000 m relay

Chen Dequan
- Simplified Chinese: 陈德全
- Traditional Chinese: 陳德全
Transcriptions
Standard Mandarin
- Hanyu Pinyin: Chén Déquán
- IPA: [ʈʂʰə̌n tɤ̌ tɕʰɥɛ̌n]

Chen Dequan (born 30 August 1995) is a Chinese male short track speed skater. He won medals in relay events at the 2014 Winter Olympics and the 2018 Winter Olympics.

== International Competition Podiums ==
Date	Competition	Location	Rank	Event	Result
11 Dec 2011	2011-12 ISU World Cup, Shanghai	(China) Oriental Sports Center	1st place, gold medalist(s)	5000m Relay	6:38.567
26 Feb 2012	2012 World Junior Championships, Melbourne	(Australia) Medibank Icehouse	Silver medal	1000 m	1:27.596
26 Feb 2012	2012 World Junior Championships, Melbourne	(Australia) Medibank Icehouse	Silver medal	3000 m relay	4:02.922
28 Oct 2012	2012-13 ISU World Cup, Montreal	(Canada) Maurice Richard Arena	2nd place, silver medalist(s)	5000m Relay	6:45.864
2 Dec 2012	2012-13 ISU World Cup, Nagoya	(Japan) Nippon Gaishi Hall	3rd place, bronze medalist(s)	5000m Relay	6:47.885
21 Feb 2014	2014 Winter Olympics, Sochi	(Russia) Iceberg Skating Palace	Bronze medal	5000 m relay	6:44.521
15 Mar 2015	2015 World Championships, Moscow	(Russia) Ice Palace Krylatskoye	Gold medal	5000 m relay	6:55.228
22 Feb 2018	2018 Winter Olympics, Pyeongchang	(South Korea) Gangneung Ice Arena	Silver medal	5000 m relay	6:32.035
