= Noh Do-hee =

South Korean speed skater (born 1995)

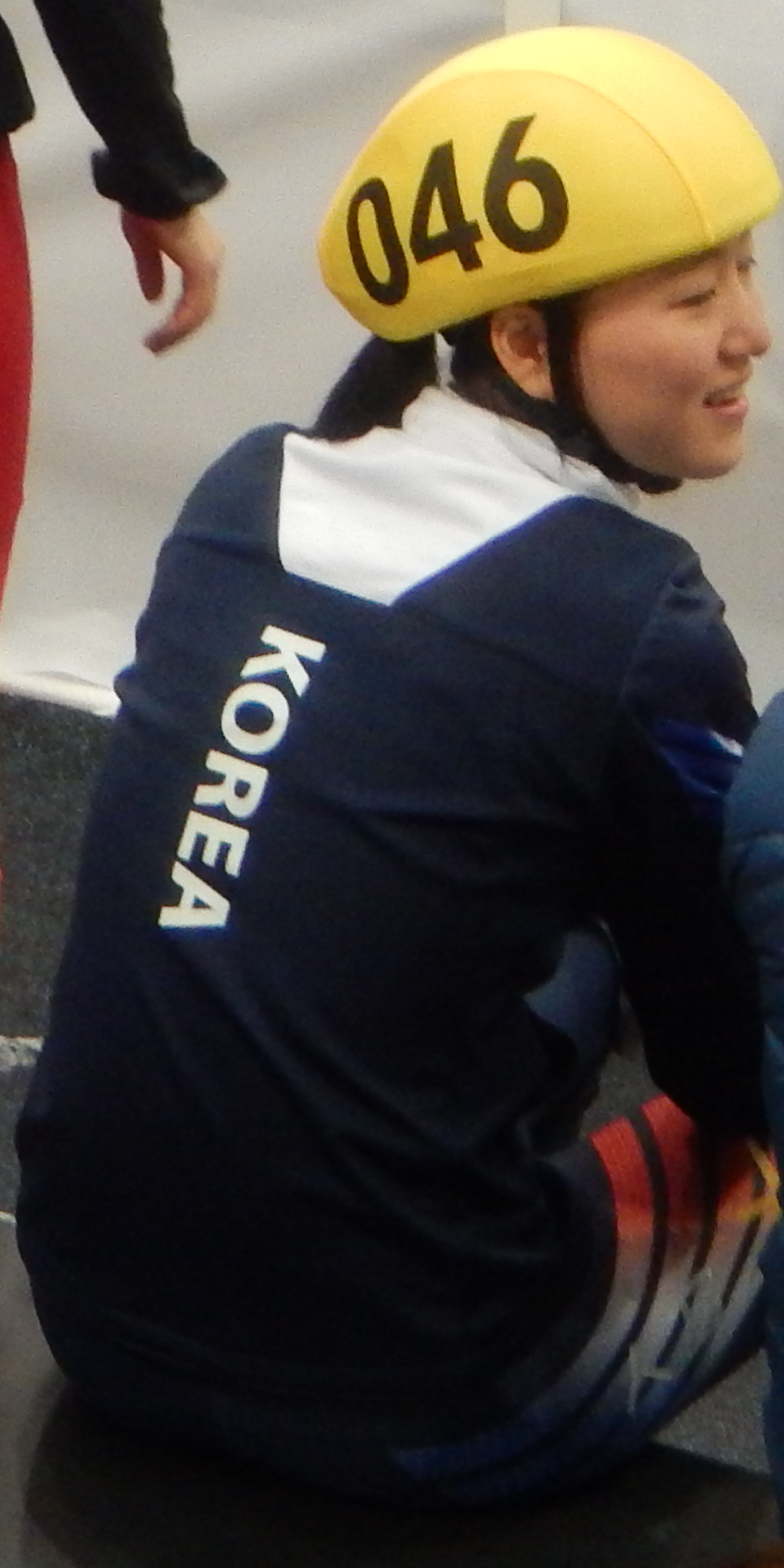
- Moscow, 2015

Personal information
- Born: 13 December 1995 (age 30) Seoul, South Korea
- Height: 171 cm (5 ft 7 in)

Sport
- Country: South Korea
- Sport: Short track speed skating
- Club: Korea National Sport University

Achievements and titles
- Personal bests: 500 m: 43.713 (2014); 1000 m: 1:30.166 (2014); 1500 m: 2:24.853 (2014); 3000 m: 5:46.351 (2014)
Medal record
Women's short-track speed skating
Representing South Korea
Olympic Games
Gold medal – first place	2026 Milano Cortina	3000 m relay
World Championships
Gold medal – first place	2015 Moscow	3000 m relay
Gold medal – first place	2016 Seoul	3000 m relay
Asian Winter Games
Gold medal – first place	2017 Sapporo	3000 m relay
Gold medal – first place	2025 Harbin	2000 m mixed relay
World Junior Championships
Gold medal – first place	2013 Warsaw	Overall
Gold medal – first place	2014 Erzurum	Overall
Winter Universiade
Gold medal – first place	2017 Almaty	3000 m relay

- Noh Do-hee
- Hangul: 노도희
- Hanja: 盧都熹
- RR: No Dohui
- MR: No Tohŭi

Noh Do-hee (Korean: 노도희; born 13 December 1995) is a South Korean short track speed skater. In the 3000 m relay, she has won gold medals at the 2026 Winter Olympics, 2015 World Championships, and 2016 World Championships.

== Career ==
Two-time overall world junior champion Noh was called up to the South Korean national team for the 2014–15 season and had two podium finishes in the 1500 metres at the 2014–15 World Cup. At the 2015 World Short Track Speed Skating Championships, she won a gold medal as part of the South Korean 3000 metre relay team. In the 2026 Winter Olympics, she won gold in the same event as a part of the same team.
