= Kim Geon-hee (speed skater) =

South Korean short track speed skater

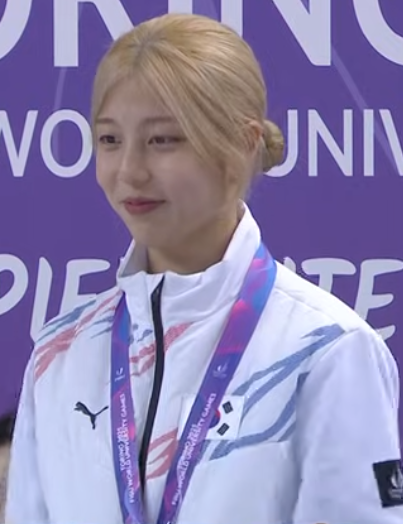
- At the 2025 Winter World University Games

Personal information
- Nationality: South Korean
- Born: 9 August 2000 (age 26)

Sport
- Country: South Korea
- Sport: Short track speed skating
- Club: Mandeok High School
Medal record
World Championships
Gold medal – first place	2019 Sofia	3000 m relay
Silver medal – second place	2023 Seoul	3000 m relay
World Junior Championships
Gold medal – first place	2020 Bormio	1500 m
Winter World University Games
Gold medal – first place	2023 Lake Placid	3000 m relay
Gold medal – first place	2025 Turin	3000 m relay
Gold medal – first place	2025 Turin	2000 m mixed relay
Silver medal – second place	2023 Lake Placid	1500 m
Bronze medal – third place	2025 Turin	1500 m

Kim Geon-hee (born 9 August 2000) is a South Korean short track speed skater.

She participated at the 2019 World Short Track Speed Skating Championships, winning a medal.
