= 2016 World Short Track Speed Skating Championships =

International speed skating competition

- Venue: Mokdong Stadium, Seoul, South Korea
- Dates: 11–13 March
- from 34 nations

Medalist men
1st place, gold medalist(s)		Han Tianyu	CHN
2nd place, silver medalist(s)		Charles Hamelin	CAN
3rd place, bronze medalist(s)		Sándor Liu Shaolin	HUN

Medalist women
1st place, gold medalist(s)		Choi Min-jeong	KOR
2nd place, silver medalist(s)		Marianne St-Gelais	CAN
3rd place, bronze medalist(s)		Elise Christie	GBR

The 2016 World Short Track Speed Skating Championships took place from 11 to 13 March 2016 in Seoul, South Korea. They were the 41st World Short Track Speed Skating Championships.

== Medal summary ==
=== Medal table ===
* Host nation (South Korea)

Rank	Nation	Gold	Silver	Bronze	Total
1	China (CHN)	4	1	2	7
2	South Korea (KOR)*	3	1	2	6
3	Canada (CAN)	2	6	1	9
4	Hungary (HUN)	1	1	2	4
5	Great Britain (GBR)	0	1	2	3
6	Russia (RUS)	0	0	1	1
Totals (6 entries)		10	10	10	30

=== Men ===
Event	Gold		Silver		Bronze	
Overall	Han Tianyu; China	68 pts	Charles Hamelin; Canada	48 pts	Sándor Liu Shaolin; Hungary	41 pts
500 m	Sándor Liu Shaolin; Hungary	41.485	Wu Dajing; China	41.550	Liu Shaoang; Hungary	41.994
1000 m	Charles Hamelin; Canada	1:24.436	Samuel Girard; Canada	1:24.787	Wu Dajing; China	1:24.868
1500 m	Han Tianyu; China	2:17.355	Liu Shaoang; Hungary	2:17.470	Park Se-yeong; South Korea	2:17.582
5000 m relay	China; Shi Jingnan; Wu Dajing; Han Tianyu; Xu Hongzhi	7:05.539	Canada; Charle Cournoyer; Alexander Fathoullin; Samuel Girard; Charles Hamelin	7:05.622	South Korea; Kwak Yoon-Gy; Seo Yi-ra; Park Ji-won; Park Se-yeong; Kim Joon-chun	7:05.652

=== Women ===
Event	Gold		Silver		Bronze	
Overall	Choi Min-jeong; South Korea	66 pts	Marianne St-Gelais; Canada	63 pts	Elise Christie; Great Britain	47 pts
500 m	Fan Kexin; China	43.258	Marianne St-Gelais; Canada	43.317	Qu Chunyu; China	43.389
1000 m	Choi Min-jeong; South Korea	1:31.903	Elise Christie; Great Britain	1:31.980	Kasandra Bradette; Canada	1:32.607
1500 m	Marianne St-Gelais; Canada	2:36.844	Choi Min-jeong; South Korea	2:37.073	Elise Christie; Great Britain	2:37.123
3000 m relay	South Korea; Noh Do-hee; Shim Suk-hee; Choi Min-jeong; Lee Eun-byul; Kim A-lang	4:19.545	Canada; Marianne St-Gelais; Valérie Maltais; Audrey Phaneuf; Kasandra Bradette; Namasthée Harris-Gauthier	4:20.193	Russia; Sofia Prosvirnova; Ekaterina Efremenkova; Emina Malagich; Evgeniya Zakharova	4:24.945
