= Samuel Girard =

Canadian short-track speed skater (born 1996)

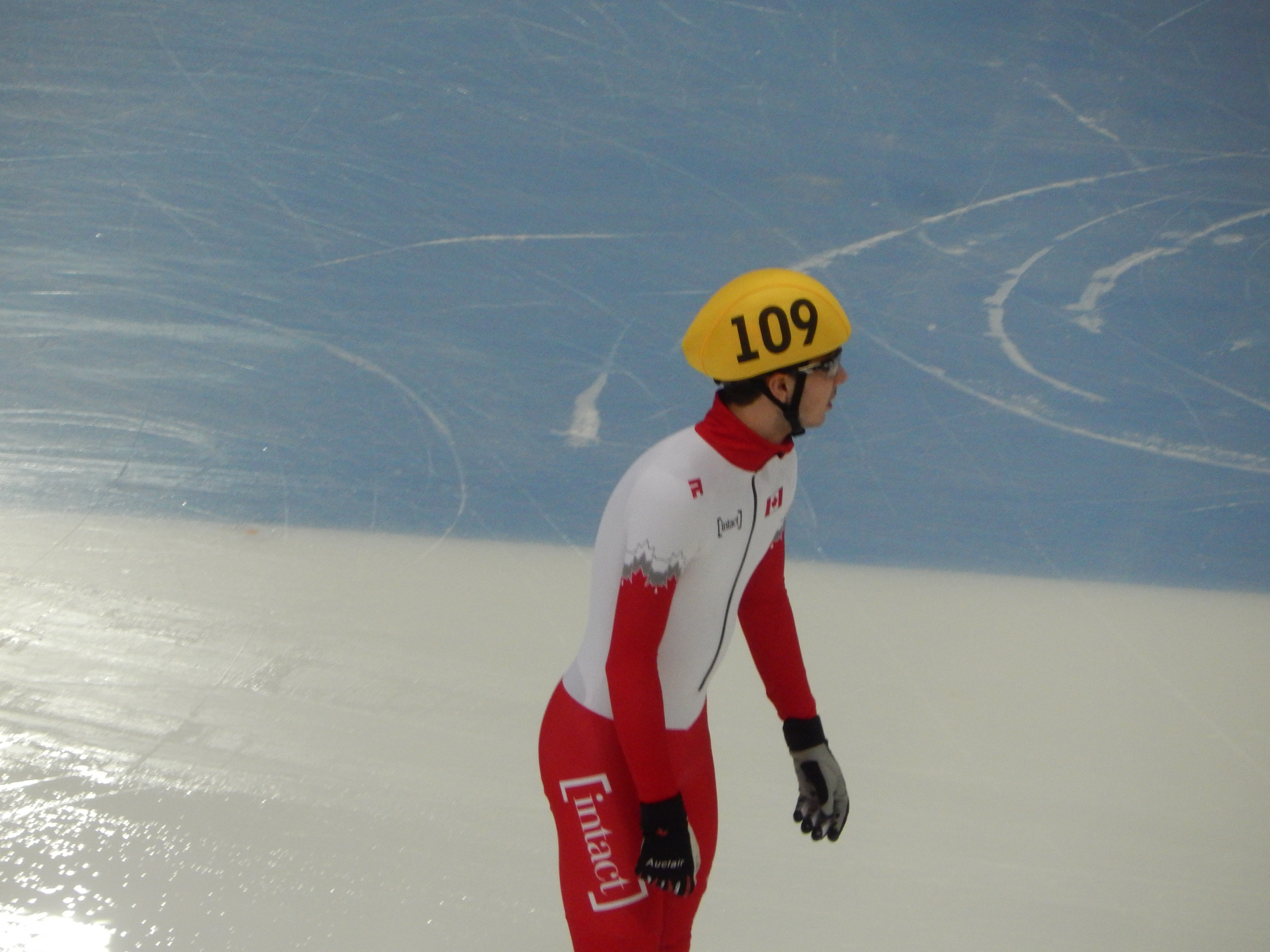
- Girard in 2015

Personal information
- Nationality: Canadian
- Born: June 26, 1996 (age 30) Ferland-et-Boilleau, Quebec, Canada
- Height: 1.81 m (5 ft 11 in)
- Weight: 72 kg (159 lb)

Sport
- Country: Canada
- Sport: Short track speed skating
- Events: 1000 m, 1500 m
Medal record
Olympic Games
Gold medal – first place	2018 Pyeongchang	1000 m
Bronze medal – third place	2018 Pyeongchang	5000 m relay
World Championships
Silver medal – second place	2016 Seoul	1000 m
Silver medal – second place	2016 Seoul	5000 m relay
Silver medal – second place	2017 Rotterdam	1500 m
Silver medal – second place	2018 Montreal	5000 m relay
Silver medal – second place	2019 Sofia	1500 m
Bronze medal – third place	2017 Rotterdam	Overall

Samuel Girard (French pronunciation: [samɥɛl ʒiʁaʁ]; born June 26, 1996) is a Canadian retired short-track speed skater. Girard is the 2018 Olympic champion and first Canadian to win the Olympic gold in the 1,000 m. He won four medals, three silver and two bronze at the World Short Track Speed Skating Championships and multiple World Cup medals.

== Career ==
Girard competed at the 2016 World Championships where he won a silver in the 1,000 m behind countryman Charles Hamelin, and a silver in the 5,000 m relay. These results led to his being named a rising star in short track competitions among Canadian media. In response to being referred to as the next Hamelin, Girard said that “I’m not the second Charles Hamelin. I will be Samuel Girard, and this will be my career. I want to follow what Charles did, and it’s really inspiring to skate with him."

The following season, Girard had an even better world championships in Rotterdam at the 2017 World Championships. There he won a silver medal in the 1,500 m event, and with his total results finished in third overall at the competition.

=== 2018 Winter Olympics ===
Girard was named to Canada's team at the 2018 Winter Olympics. In the 1,000 m competition, he was in the semi-final together with teammate Hamelin. Girard initially failed to qualify for the final but a review of a tight passing scenario in the semi-final determined that Hamelin had interfered with Girard and Girard was advanced to the final. Skating the final, Girard led almost from start to finish, with his tactics to stay out of trouble in the pack. His strategy was proven wise when Hungarian skater Sándor Liu Shaolin took out both Korean skaters behind Girard in an aggressive pass. This cleared the way for Girard to win the gold in 1,000 m, the first Canadian short track speed skater to win in the distance.

=== Retirement ===
While competing at the 2019 World Championships Girard won another silver medal, his fourth individual world medal and sixth including two relay medals. During the summer of 2019, Girard and his girlfriend Kasandra Bradette suddenly announced their retirement. Girard was expected to be the heir to Charles Hamelin but actually retired before the elder. His retirement left the Canadian men's short track team without a true star aside from Hamelin, leaving Kim Boutin as the sole leader of the Canadian team.
