= Bernadett Heidum =

Hungarian short track speed skater

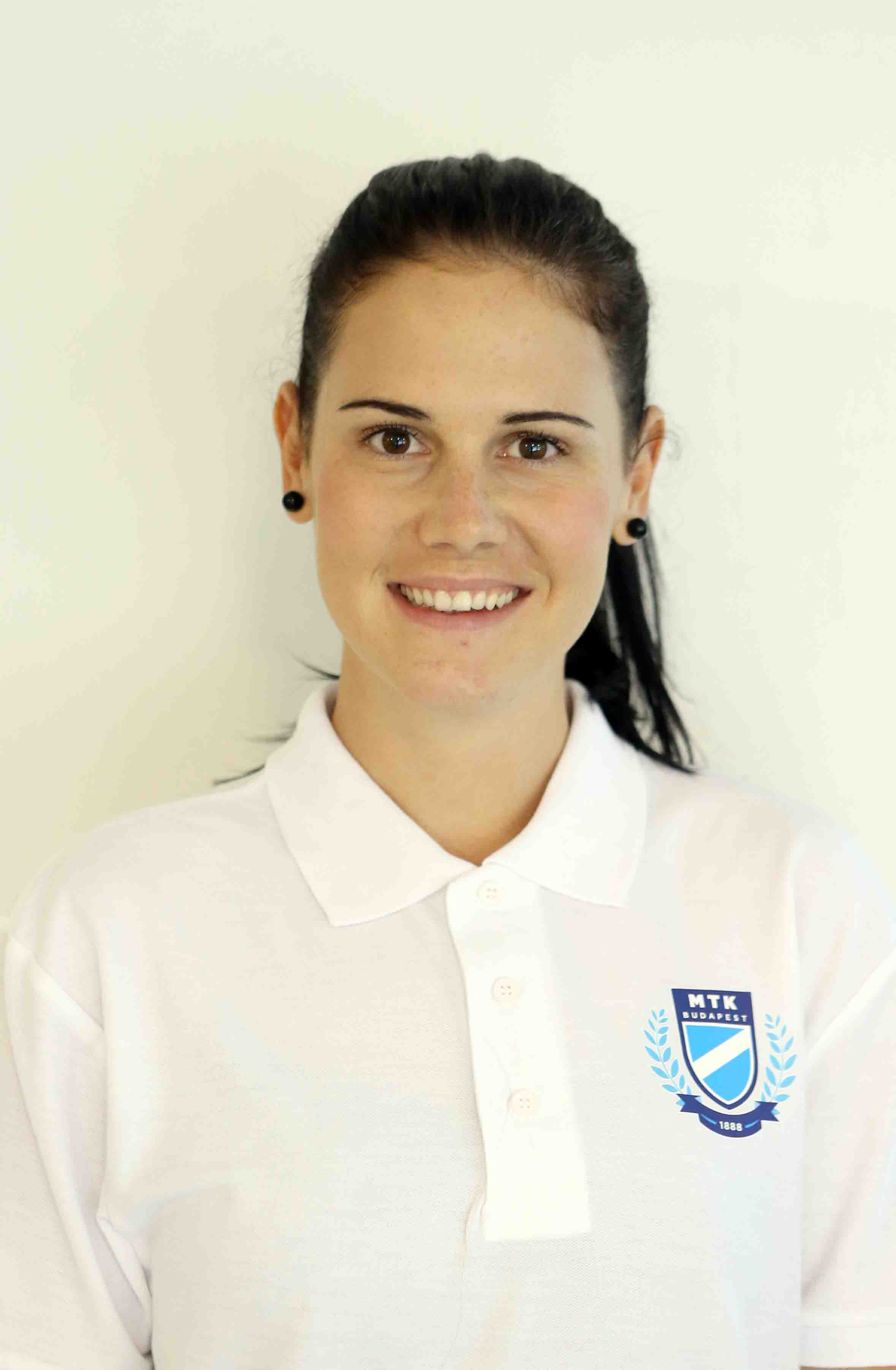
- Heidum in 2015

Personal information
- Born: 26 May 1988 (age 38) Budapest, Hungary
- Height: 169 cm (5 ft 7 in)
- Spouse: András Nagy

Sport
- Sport: Short track speed skating
Medal record
World Championships
Silver medal – second place	2017 Rotterdam	3000 m relay
Winter Universiade
Silver medal – second place	2013 Trentino	1500 m
Bronze medal – third place	2011 Erzurum	3000 m relay
Bronze medal – third place	2013 Trentino	3000 m relay
European Championships
Gold medal – first place	2009 Turin	3000 m relay
Silver medal – second place	2011 Heerenveen	Overall
Silver medal – second place	2012 Mlada Boleslav	1000 m
Silver medal – second place	2014 Dresden	1500 m
Silver medal – second place	2018 Dresden	3000 m relay
Bronze medal – third place	2012 Mlada Boleslav	3000 m relay
Bronze medal – third place	2014 Dresden	3000 m relay
Bronze medal – third place	2015 Dordrecht	3000 m relay

Bernadett Heidum (born 26 May 1988) is a Hungarian short track speed skater. She competed at the 2010, 2014, and 2018 Winter Olympics.

Winter Olympics
Preceded by Júlia Sebestyén	Flagbearer for Hungary; Sochi 2014	Succeeded by Konrád Nagy
