= Marianne St-Gelais =

Canadian short-track speed skater

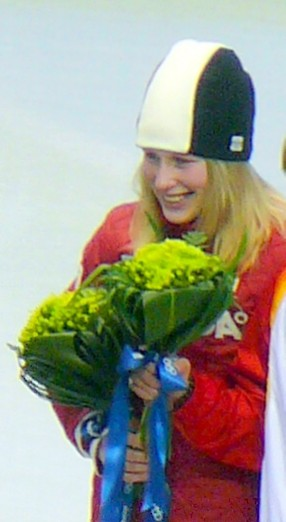
- St-Gelais in 2020

Personal information
- Born: February 17, 1990 (age 36) Roberval, Quebec, Canada
- Height: 1.62 m (5 ft 4 in)

Sport
- Country: Canada
- Sport: Short-track speed skating

Achievements and titles
- Personal bests: 500 m: 43.922 WR (2009); 1000 m: (2009); 1500 m: (2009); 3000 m: (2009)
Medal record
Olympic Games
| Silver medal – second place | 2010 Vancouver | 500 m |
| Silver medal – second place | 2010 Vancouver | 3000 m relay |
| Silver medal – second place | 2014 Sochi | 3000 m relay |
World Championships
| Gold medal – first place | 2016 Seoul | 1500 m |
| Silver medal – second place | 2010 Sofia | 3000 m relay |
| Silver medal – second place | 2013 Debrecen | 3000 m |
| Silver medal – second place | 2013 Debrecen | 3000 m relay |
| Silver medal – second place | 2014 Montreal | 3000 m relay |
| Silver medal – second place | 2016 Seoul | Overall |
| Silver medal – second place | 2016 Seoul | 500 m |
| Silver medal – second place | 2016 Seoul | 3000 m relay |
| Silver medal – second place | 2017 Rotterdam | Overall |
| Silver medal – second place | 2017 Rotterdam | 500 m |
| Silver medal – second place | 2017 Rotterdam | 1000 m |
| Silver medal – second place | 2017 Rotterdam | 1500 m |
| Bronze medal – third place | 2010 Sofia | 500 m |
| Bronze medal – third place | 2011 Sheffield | 3000 m relay |
| Bronze medal – third place | 2013 Debrecen | 1500 m |
| Bronze medal – third place | 2018 Montreal | 3000 m relay |
World Team Championships
| Silver medal – second place | 2010 Bormio | Team |
World Junior Championships
| Gold medal – first place | 2009 Sherbrooke | 500 m |
| Silver medal – second place | 2009 Sherbrooke | 3000 m relay |
| Bronze medal – third place | 2008 Bolzano | 500 m |
| Bronze medal – third place | 2008 Bolzano | 2000 m relay |

Marianne St-Gelais (born February 17, 1990) is a Canadian former short track speed skater. She won two silver medals in the 500 m and 3,000 m relay at the Vancouver 2010 Winter Olympics, and a third silver in the 3,000 m relay at the 2014 Winter Olympics in Sochi.

== Personal life ==
St-Gelais, one of five siblings, began skating at the age of 10 when her neighbour encouraged her to join the local speed skating club. Her younger sister Catherine, 15, and brother Bastien 13, still skate competitively.

Marianne calls Saint-Félicien, Quebec her hometown but currently resides in Montreal. In mid-2018, she broke up with her then-boyfriend, short track speed skater Charles Hamelin. St-Gelais as well as boyfriend Hamelin made Hello Canada's 50 most beautiful Canadians list in 2010.

== Career ==
As an accomplished junior skater, and world record holder, St-Gelais placed first overall at the 2007 Canada Games with four gold (500m, 1000m, 3000m and relay) and one silver medal (1500m). St-Gelais was named team Canada's "rising star" of 2009. Marianne St-Gelais is the 2009 world junior champion and world junior record holder in the 500 metres with a time of 43.922 seconds. St-Gelais won her first ever World Cup medal in 500m short track speed skating at Vancouver in 2009.

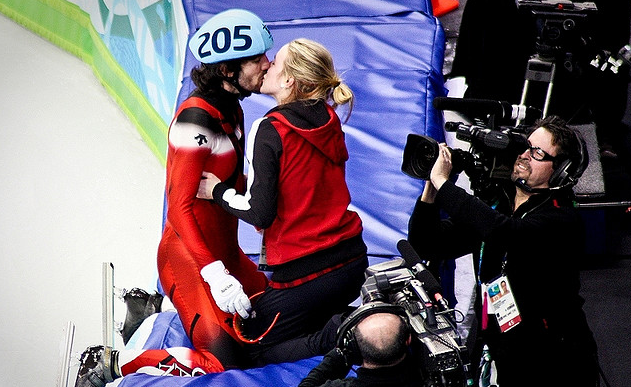
St-Gelais kisses then-boyfriend Hamelin, after he won his gold medal at the 2010 Winter Olympics

St-Gelais was a member of the Canadian team that attended the 2010 Winter Olympics in both the 500m and 3,000m relay. Prior to these Olympic games she had yet to win any medals at an Olympics or world championships. On February 17, her 20th birthday, she won a silver medal in the 500 metres. She followed this success with a silver medal on February 24, in the 3,000 metre relay, along with Jessica Gregg, Kalyna Roberge and Tania Vicent. After the Olympics St-Gelais continued on her success at the Olympics with a bronze in the 500m at the 2010 World Championships as well as a silver in the 3,000m relay. At the World Team Championships St-Gelais was a part of the Canadian squad that won silver in the event. This concluded what was the most successful season of her young career, with 2 Olympic silvers, 2 world championship silvers, and a worlds bronze.

St-Gelais ended the 2010–11 ISU World Cup season as the 500 m World Cup Champion.

At the 2014 Winter Olympics she took a third Olympic medal as part of the Canadian team in the 3,000 m relay.

=== 2018 Winter Olympics ===
In August 2017, St-Gelais was named to Canada's 2018 Winter Olympics team. However she was unable to secure a medal there, being disqualified in the 500 m for interference. However, after the Games she competed in her eighth World Championships, where she secured a bronze medal. She retired from competition that year.
