= Shi Jingnan =

Chinese short track speed skater

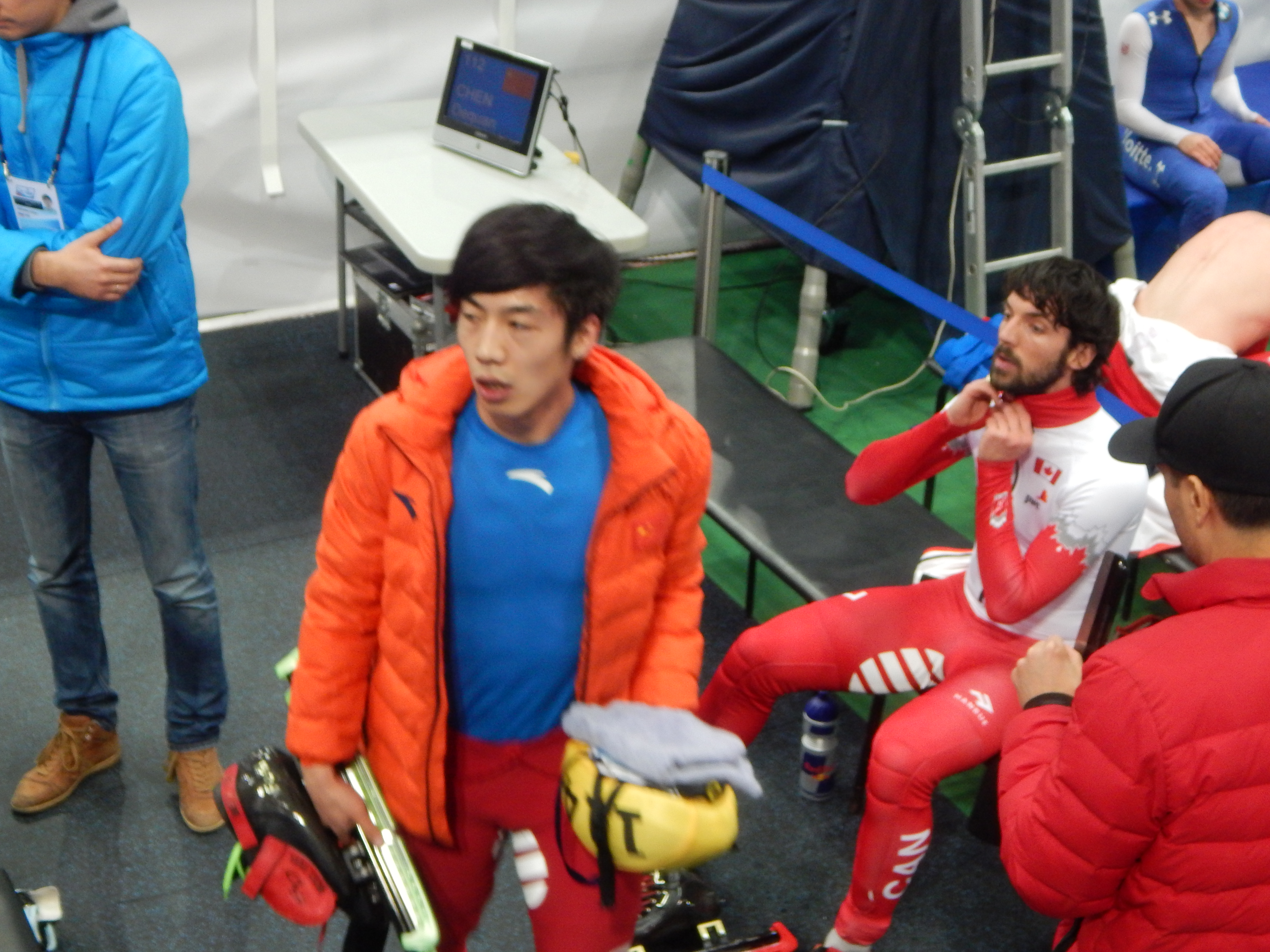
- Moscow 2015

Personal information
- Born: 7 April 1994 (age 32) Daqing, Heilongjiang, China
- Height: 175 cm (5 ft 9 in)
- Weight: 66 kg (146 lb)

Sport
- Country: China
- Sport: Short track speed skating
- Coached by: Li Yan (National Team Coach)

Achievements and titles
- Personal best(s): 500m: 40.641 (2014); 1000m: 1:25.771 (2013); 1500m: 2:16.333 (2011); 3000m: 5:01.801 (2014)
Medal record
Olympic Games
Bronze medal – third place	2014 Sochi	5000 m relay
World Championships
Gold medal – first place	2015 Moscow	5000 m relay
Gold medal – first place	2016 Seoul	5000 m relay
Silver medal – second place	2014 Montreal	3000 m
Bronze medal – third place	2015 Moscow	1000 m
Asian Winter Games
Gold medal – first place	2017 Sapporo	5000 m relay
World Junior Championships
Bronze medal – third place	2011 Courmayeur	1000 m
Bronze medal – third place	2011 Courmayeur	Super 1500 m
Winter Universiade
Bronze medal – third place	2013 Trentino	500 m

Shi Jingnan (Chinese: 石竟男; born 7 April 1994) is a Chinese male short track speed skater.
