= Csaba Burján =

Hungarian speed skater (born 1994)

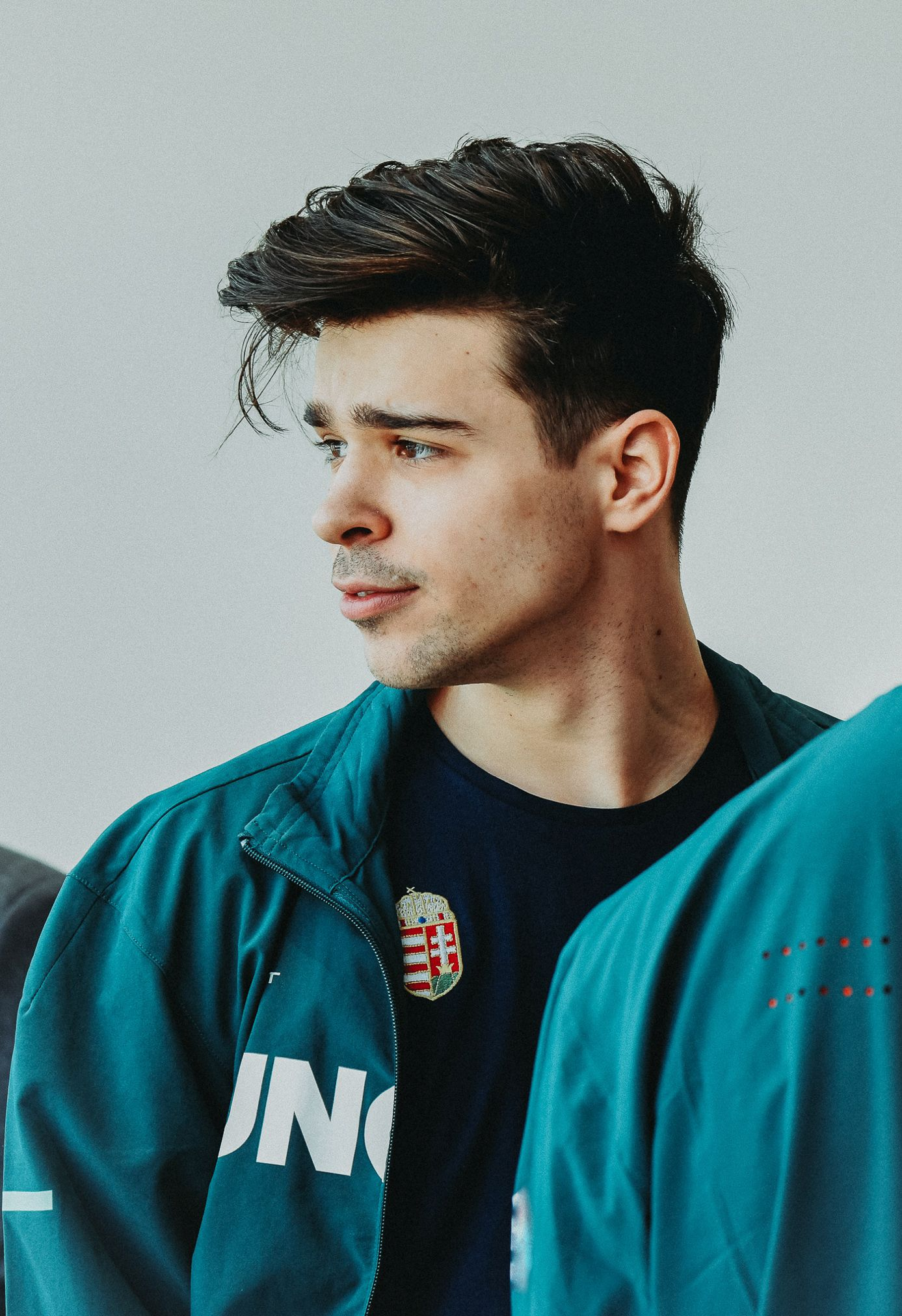
- Burján in 2018

Personal information
- Born: 27 September 1994 (age 31) Pécs, Hungary
- Height: 1.82 m (6 ft 0 in)
- Weight: 79 kg (174 lb)

Sport
- Country: Hungary
- Sport: Short track speed skating
- Club: Pécsi Korcsolyázó SE
Medal record
Olympic Games
Gold medal – first place	2018 Pyeongchang	5000 m relay
World Championships
Silver medal – second place	2015 Moscow	5000 m relay
Silver medal – second place	2021 Dordrecht	5000 m relay
Bronze medal – third place	2017 Rotterdam	5000 m relay
Bronze medal – third place	2019 Sofia	5000 m relay
European Championships
Gold medal – first place	2019 Dordrecht	5000 m relay
Silver medal – second place	2015 Dordrecht	5000 m relay
Silver medal – second place	2016 Sochi	5000 m relay
Bronze medal – third place	2013 Malmö	5000 m relay
Bronze medal – third place	2018 Dresden	5000 m relay
Winter Universiade
Gold medal – first place	2013 Trentino	5000 m relay
World Junior Championships
Silver medal – second place	2014 Erzurum	3000 m relay

Csaba Burján (Hungarian pronunciation: [ˈt͡ʃɒbɒ ˈburjaːn], born 27 September 1994) is a Hungarian Olympic gold medalist short track speed skater.
