= Alexander Fathoullin =

Canadian speed skater

Personal information
- Born: August 26, 1995 (age 30) Iqaluit, Northwest Territories, Canada
- Height: 1.81 m (5 ft 11 in)
- Weight: 71 kg (157 lb; 11.2 st)

Sport
- Country: Canada
- Sport: Speed skating
Medal record
World Championships
Silver medal – second place	2016 Seoul	5000 m relay

Alexander Fathoullin (born August 26, 1995) is a Canadian short-track speed skater. He won world championship and World Cup medals.
