= Dmitry Migunov =

Russian speed skater

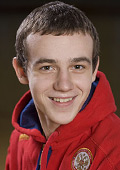

Personal information
- Born: 21 November 1992 (age 33) Ufa, Russia

Sport
- Country: Russia
- Sport: Short track speed skating
- World Cup wins: 4
Medal record
Men's short track speed skating
Representing Russia
European Championships
Gold medal – first place	2014 Dresden	5000m relay
Gold medal – first place	2015 Dordrecht	5000m relay
Bronze medal – third place	2016 Sochi	500m
Bronze medal – third place	2016 Sochi	1000m

Dmitry Andreyevich Migunov (Russian: Дмитрий Андреевич Мигунов; born 21 November 1992) is a Russian speed skater, Olympic athlete, and an Honored Master of Sports of Russia.

== World Cup podiums ==
Date	Season	Location	Rank	Event
10 November 2013	2013–14	Turin	2nd place, silver medalist(s)	5000m relay
17 November 2013	2013–14	Kolomna	2nd place, silver medalist(s)	5000m relay
8 February 2014	2014–15	Dresden	1st place, gold medalist(s)	500m
9 November 2014	2014–15	Salt Lake City	1st place, gold medalist(s)	5000m relay
15 November 2014	2014–15	Montreal	2nd place, silver medalist(s)	500m
16 November 2014	2014–15	Montreal	1st place, gold medalist(s)	500m
13 December 2014	2014–15	Shanghai	3rd place, bronze medalist(s)	500m
14 December 2014	2014–15	Shanghai	1st place, gold medalist(s)	500m
