= Han Yutong =

Chinese speed skater

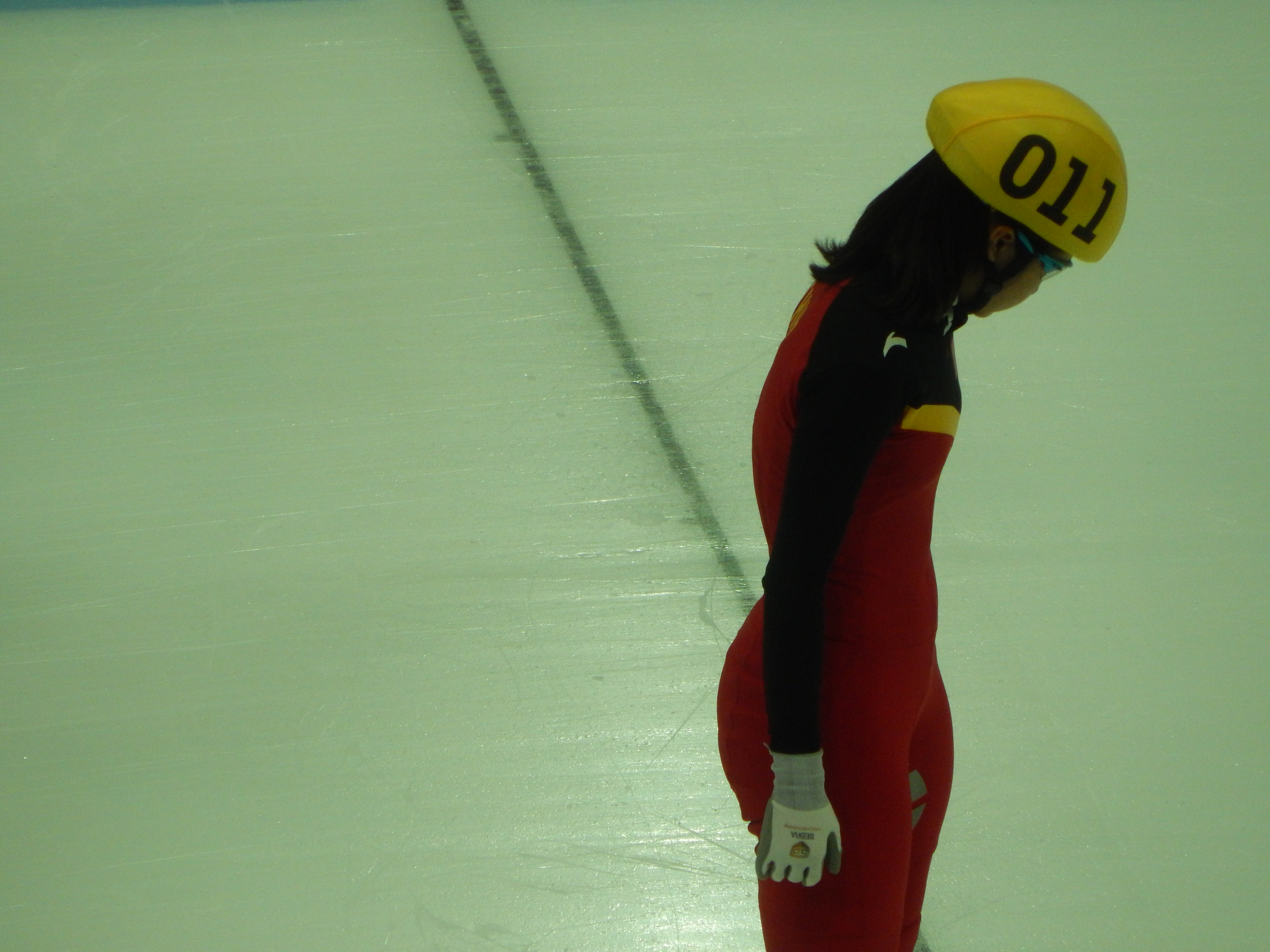
- World Championships in Moscow (2015)

Personal information
- Born: 16 September 1994 (age 31) Yanbian, Jilin, China

Sport
- Country: China
- Sport: Short track speed skating

Achievements and titles
- Personal best(s): 500m: 43.765 (2014); 1000m: 1:31.180 (2012); 1500m: 2:19.983 (2014)
Medal record
Women's short track speed skating
Representing China
Olympic Games
| Bronze medal – third place | 2022 Beijing | 3000 m relay |
World Championships
| Gold medal – first place | 2014 Montreal | 3000 m relay |
| Silver medal – second place | 2015 Moscow | 3000 m relay |
World Junior Championships
| Gold medal – first place | 2013 Warsaw | 500 m |
| Silver medal – second place | 2014 Erzurum | 500 m |
| Silver medal – second place | 2013 Warsaw | 3000 m relay |
| Silver medal – second place | 2012 Melbourne | 3000 m relay |
| Bronze medal – third place | 2013 Warsaw | Overall |
| Bronze medal – third place | 2013 Warsaw | 1000 m |
| Bronze medal – third place | 2014 Erzurum | 3000 m relay |
Winter Universiade
| Gold medal – first place | 2015 Granada | 500 m |
| Gold medal – first place | 2015 Granada | 3000 m relay |
| Bronze medal – third place | 2015 Granada | 1500 m |

Han Yutong
- Simplified Chinese: 韩雨桐
- Traditional Chinese: 韓雨桐
Transcriptions
Standard Mandarin
- Hanyu Pinyin: Hán Yǔtóng
- IPA: [xǎn ỳ tʰʊ̌ŋ]

Han Yutong (Chinese: 韩雨桐; pinyin: Hán Yǔtóng;; Mandarin pronunciation: [xǎn ỳ tʰʊ̌ŋ]; born 16 September 1994) is a Chinese female short track speed skater. She competed at the 2018 Winter Olympics and the 2022 Winter Olympics.
