= Tao Jiaying =

Chinese female short track speed skater (born 1993)

Personal information
- Born: 15 April 1993 (age 33) Heilongjiang, China
- Height: 171 cm (5 ft 7 in)
- Weight: 56 kg (123 lb)

Sport
- Country: China
- Sport: Short track speed skating

Achievements and titles
- Personal best(s): 1000m: 1:30.862 (2013); 1500m: 2:27.244 (2013)
Medal record
Women's short track speed skating
Representing China
World Championships
Silver medal – second place	2015 Moscow	3000 m relay
Winter Universiade
Gold medal – first place	2013 Trentino	1500 m
Bronze medal – third place	2013 Trentino	1000 m

Tao Jiaying (Chinese: 陶嘉莹, born 15 April 1993) is a Chinese female short track speed skater. She won the gold medal for Ladies' 1500 meters and the bronze medal for 1000 meters in 2013 Winter Universiade, Trentino.
