= Cole Krueger =

Hungarian speed skater (born 1991)

Personal information
- Nationality: Hungarian/American
- Born: 22 August 1991 (age 34) Pittsburgh, United States

Sport
- Country: Hungary
- Sport: Short track speed skating
- Club: FTC
Medal record
World Championships
Bronze medal – third place	2019 Sofia	5000 m relay

Cole Krueger (born 22 August 1991) is a Hungarian short track speed skater.

He participated at the 2019 World Short Track Speed Skating Championships, winning a medal. Cole competed for the US until 2018, when he switched his representation to Hungary. His brother, John-Henry Krueger, made the same move in 2019.
