= Charle Cournoyer =

Canadian short track speed skater

Personal information
- Born: June 11, 1991 (age 35) Boucherville, Quebec, Canada
- Height: 1.73 m (5 ft 8 in)
- Weight: 68 kg (150 lb)

Sport
- Country: Canada
- Sport: Short track speed skating
- Club: Longueuil Speed Skating Club
Medal record
Olympic Games
Bronze medal – third place	2014 Sochi	500 m
Bronze medal – third place	2018 Pyeongchang	5000 m relay
World Championships
Gold medal – first place	2013 Debrecen	5000 m relay
Silver medal – second place	2016 Seoul	5000 m relay
Silver medal – second place	2018 Montreal	5000 m relay

Charle Cournoyer (born June 11, 1991) is a Canadian short track speed skater. He won an Olympic bronze medal in the 500 m at the 2014 Winter Olympics. Cournoyer was also part of the gold medal World Championship relay team at the 2013 ISU World Championships for Canada.

== Career ==
Cournoyer won a surprise bronze medal in the 500 m at the 2014 Winter Olympics. After winning the medal he said that "I came in here to have as much fun as possible. I was expecting to be good but the bronze medal? It was a fog for me. I was just racing, doing what I know. The atmosphere was really great, with Victor An winning the gold medal. It was super loud." He was the youngest member of the Canadian short track team at the 2014 Winter Olympics. Cournoyer had been pegged by national director, Yves Hamelin, as a rising star in Canadian short track. Hamelin said that "He's the one we invested a lot in the last couple of years." His son Charles Hamelin, an Olympic star for Canada also spoke highly of Cournoyer, saying that "He's the future of short track for Canada. It's good for him to bring back a medal. It will put some confidence in his skating."

=== 2018 Winter Olympics ===
In August 2017, Cournoyer was named to Canada's 2018 Winter Olympics team.
