= Park Se-yeong =

South Korean speed skater

Personal information
- Born: 26 July 1993 (age 33) Suwon, South Korea
- Height: 5 ft 8 in (173 cm)
- Weight: 128 lb (58 kg)

Sport
- Country: South Korea
- Sport: Short track speed skating
Medal record
World Championships
Gold medal – first place	2015 Moscow	1000 m
Silver medal – second place	2014 Montreal	5000 m relay
Silver medal – second place	2015 Moscow	3000 m
Silver medal – second place	2015 Moscow	Overall
Silver medal – second place	2016 Seoul	1500 m
Bronze medal – third place	2014 Montreal	1000 m
Bronze medal – third place	2014 Montreal	1500 m
World Junior Championships
Gold medal – first place	2012 Melbourne	Overall
Gold medal – first place	2013 Warsaw	Overall
Bronze medal – third place	2010 Taipei	Overall
Winter Universiade
Gold medal – first place	2015 Granada	1000 m
Gold medal – first place	2015 Granada	1500 m
Asian Winter Games
Gold medal – first place	2017 Sapporo	1500 m
Silver medal – second place	2017 Sapporo	5000 m relay
Bronze medal – third place	2017 Sapporo	500 m

- Park Se-yeong
- Hangul: 박세영
- Hanja: 朴 世映
- RR: Bak Seyeong
- MR: Pak Seyŏng

Park Se-yeong (born 26 July 1993) is a South Korean short track speed skater.

== Personal life ==
His sisters are Park Seung-ju, a speed skater, and Park Seung-hi, a short track speed skater. In February 2014, all of them competed for the South Korea national team in the 2014 Winter Olympics.
