= Lucia Peretti =

Italian speed skater

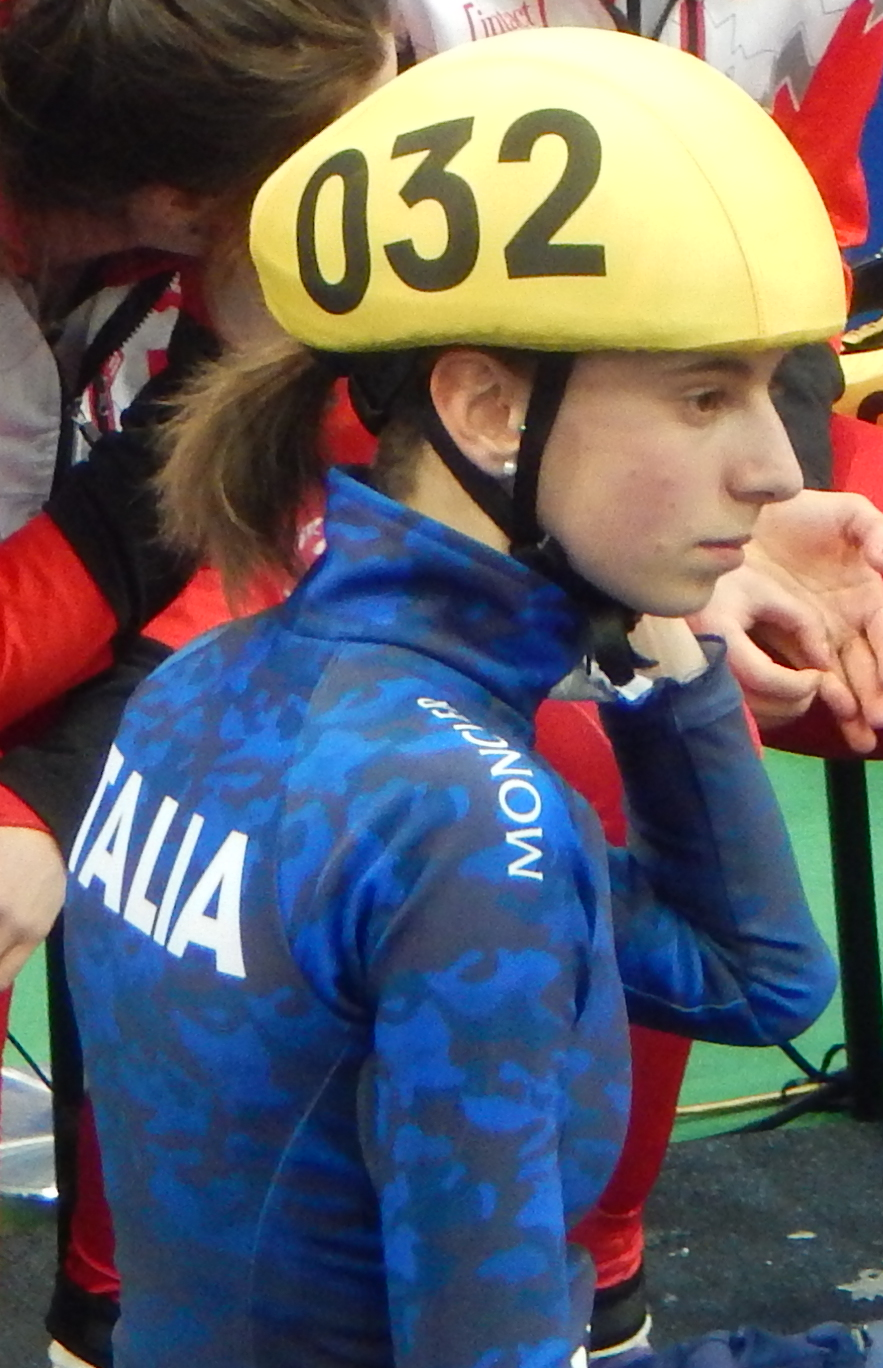
- World Championships, Moscow, 2015

Personal information
- Born: 14 November 1990 (age 35) Sondalo, Italy
- Height: 5 ft 5 in (165 cm)
- Weight: 119 lb (54 kg)

Sport
- Country: Italy
- Sport: Short track speed skating

Achievements and titles
- World finals: 1
- Highest world ranking: 20 (1500m)
Medal record
Women's short track speed skating
Representing Italy
Olympic Games
Silver medal – second place	2018 Pyeongchang	3000 m relay
Bronze medal – third place	2014 Sochi	3000 m relay
World Championships
Bronze medal – third place	2014 Montreal	3000 m relay
Bronze medal – third place	2015 Moscow	3000 m relay
World Team Championships
Bronze medal – third place	2010 Bormio	Team
European Championships
Bronze medal – third place	2017 Turin	1500 m

Lucia Peretti (born 14 November 1990) is an Italian short track speed skater.

== Career ==
Peretti competed at the 2010 Winter Olympics for Italy. She was a member of the Italian 3000 metre relay team. She did not race in the semifinals, where the team finished fourth, but did in the B Final, finishing third and ending up sixth overall.

As of 2013, Peretti's best performance at the World Championships came in 2012, finishing 4th as a member of the Italian relay team. She also won a bronze medal at the 2010 World Short Track Speed Skating Team Championships for Italy, and a gold medal at the World Junior Championships.

As of 2013, Peretti has six ISU Short Track Speed Skating World Cup podium finishes, all as part of the Italian relay team. Her best finishes are a pair of silver medals in 2008–09. Her best finish in the World Cup rankings is 20th, in the 1500 metres in 2013–14.

== World Cup podiums ==
Date	Season	Location	Rank	Event
30 November 2008	2008–09	Beijing	3rd place, bronze medalist(s)	3000m Relay
8 February 2009	2008–09	Sofia	2nd place, silver medalist(s)	3000m Relay
15 February 2009	2008–09	Dresden	2nd place, silver medalist(s)	3000m Relay
29 September 2013	2013–14	Shanghai	3rd place, bronze medalist(s)	3000m Relay
10 November 2013	2013–14	Turin	3rd place, bronze medalist(s)	3000m Relay
17 November 2013	2013–14	Kolomna	3rd place, bronze medalist(s)	3000m Relay
