= Emina Malagich =

Russian speed skater

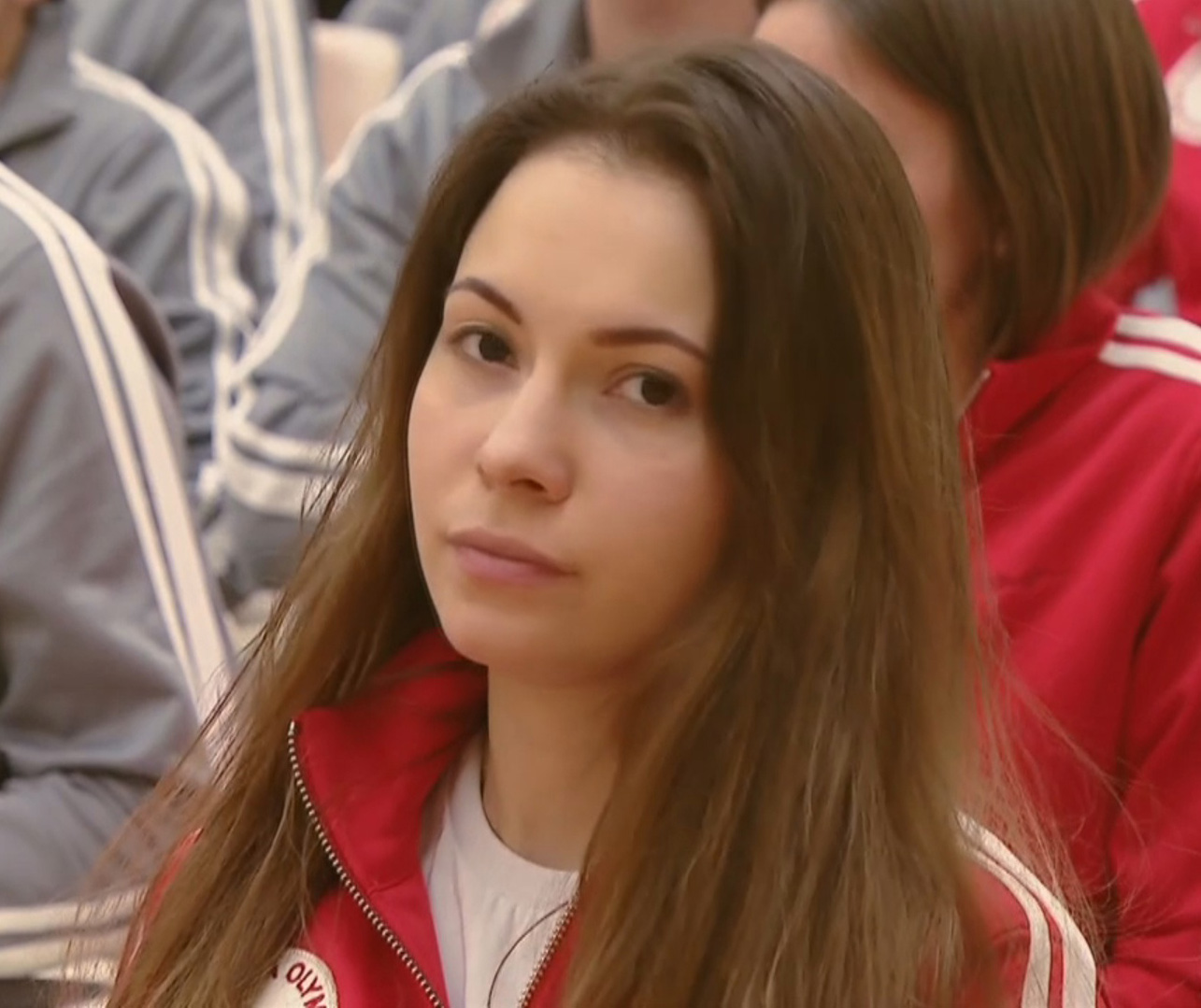
- Malagich in 2018

Personal information
- Native name: Эмина Асимовна Малагич
- Full name: Emina Asimovna Malagich
- Nationality: Russian
- Born: 29 August 1995 (age 30) Moscow, Russia
- Height: 1.66 m (5 ft 5 in)
- Weight: 56 kg (123 lb)

Sport
- Country: Russia
- Sport: Short track speed skating
- Club: MGFSO
Medal record
Representing Russia
World Championships
| Silver medal – second place | 2019 Sofia | 3000 m relay |
| Bronze medal – third place | 2016 Seoul | 3000 m relay |
European championships
| Gold medal – first place | 2015 Dordrecht | 3000 m relay |
| Gold medal – first place | 2018 Dresden | 3000 m relay |
| Silver medal – second place | 2016 Sochi | 3000 m relay |
| Silver medal – second place | 2019 Dordrecht | 3000 m relay |
| Bronze medal – third place | 2020 Debrecen | 3000 m relay |
Winter Universiade
| Gold medal – first place | 2019 Krasnoyarsk | 3000 m relay |
| Silver medal – second place | 2013 Trentino | 3000 m relay |

Emina Asimovna Malagich (Russian: Эмина Асимовна Малагич, Bosnian: Emina Malagić; born 29 August 1995) is a Russian short-track speed skater. She competed in the women's 500 metres at the 2018 Winter Olympics. She is of Bosnia and Herzegovina descent.
