= Freek van der Wart =

Short track speed skater

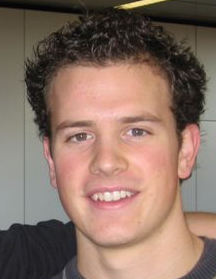
- Freek van der Wart

Personal information
- Born: 1 February 1988 (age 38) Voorburg, Netherlands
- Height: 183 cm (6 ft 0 in)
- Weight: 80 kg (176 lb)

Sport
- Country: Netherlands
- Sport: Short track speed skating
- Coached by: Jeroen Otter
Medal record
Men's short track speed skating
Representing Netherlands
World Championships
Gold medal – first place	2014 Montreal	5000 m Relay
Silver medal – second place	2012 Shanghai	5000 m Relay
Bronze medal – third place	2013 Debrecen	500 m
Bronze medal – third place	2013 Debrecen	5000 m Relay
Bronze medal – third place	2015 Moscow	5000 m Relay

Freek van der Wart (born 1 February 1988) is a retired Dutch male short track speed skater.
