= Kasandra Bradette =

Canadian short track speed skater

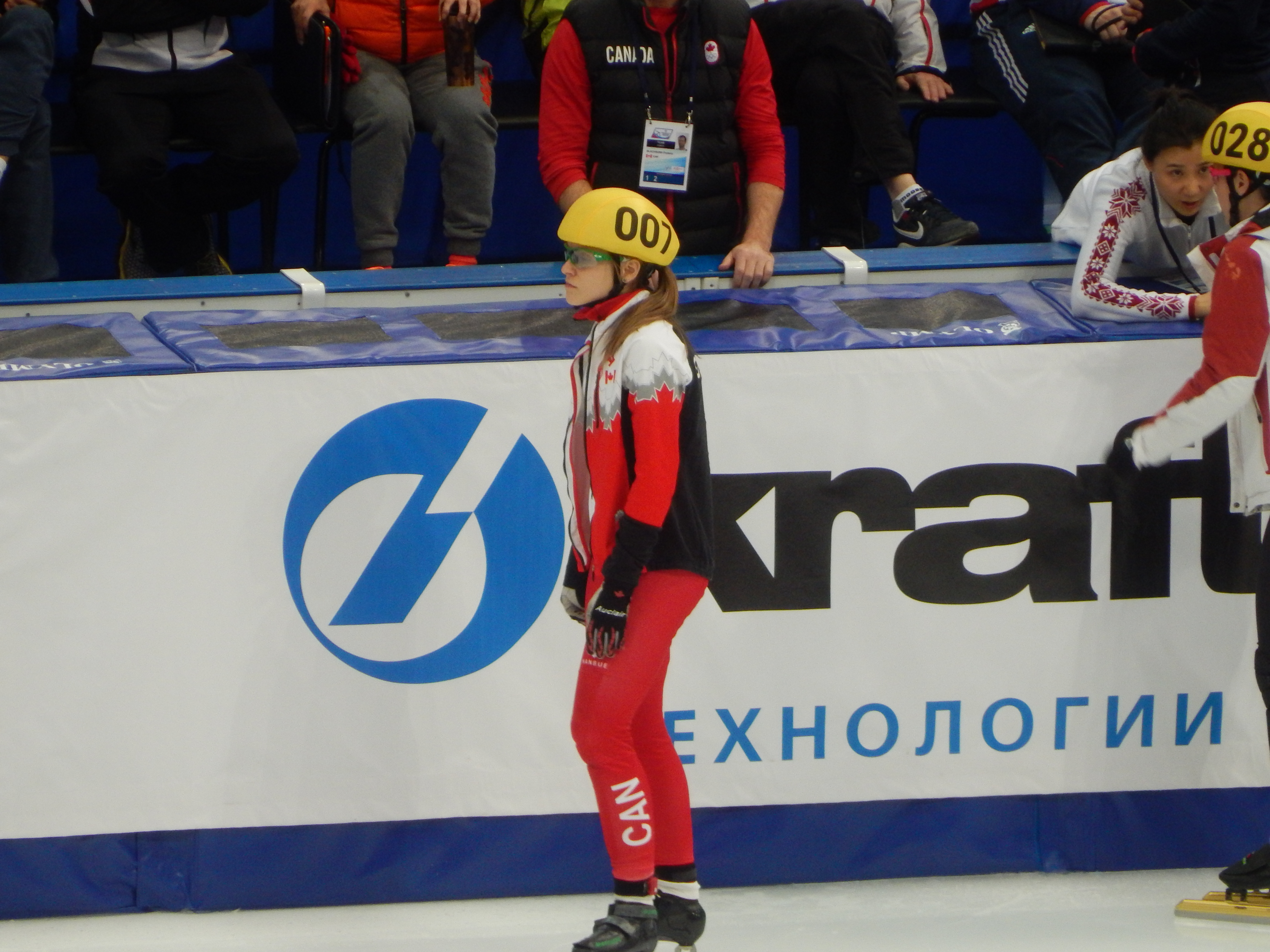
- Bradette in 2015

Personal information
- Born: October 10, 1989 (age 36) Saint-Félicien, Québec, Canada
- Height: 160 cm (5 ft 3 in)
- Weight: 55 kg (121 lb)

Sport
- Country: Canada
- Sport: Short track speed skating
Medal record
World Championships
Silver medal – second place	2016 Seoul	3000 m relay
Bronze medal – third place	2016 Seoul	1000 m
Bronze medal – third place	2018 Montreal	3000 m relay

Kasandra Bradette (born October 10, 1989) is a Canadian short track speed skater. She has won world championship and World Cup medals.

== Career ==
=== 2018 Winter Olympics ===
In August 2017, Bradette was named to Canada's 2018 Winter Olympics team.

In her second world championship appearance in 2016, Bradette stood on the podium twice, winning an individual bronze medal in the 1000m and a silver medal with the 3000m relay. At the Canadian selection trials for PyeongChang 2018, Bradette finished third in the overall standings. She made her Olympic debut as a member of the 3000m relay team.
