= Viktor Knoch =

Hungarian speed skater (born 1989)

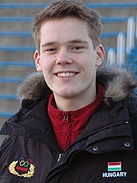
- Knoch in 2009

Personal information
- Born: 12 December 1989 (age 36) Pécs, Hungary

Sport
- Country: Hungary
- Sport: Short track speed skating
Medal record
Olympic Games
Gold medal – first place	2018 Pyeongchang	5000 m relay
World Championships
Silver medal – second place	2015 Moscow	5000 m relay
Bronze medal – third place	2017 Rotterdam	5000 m relay
European Championships
Silver medal – second place	2007 Sheffield	1500 m
Silver medal – second place	2007 Sheffield	5000 m relay
Silver medal – second place	2009 Turin	500 m
Silver medal – second place	2015 Dordrecht	5000 m relay
Bronze medal – third place	2009 Turin	1000 m
Bronze medal – third place	2009 Turin	1500 m
Bronze medal – third place	2009 Turin	5000 m relay
Bronze medal – third place	2013 Malmö	5000 m relay
Bronze medal – third place	2018 Dresden	5000 m relay

Viktor Knoch (born 12 December 1989) is a Hungarian Olympic gold medalist short track speed skater. He represented Hungary at four Winter Olympic games in 2006, 2010, 2014, and 2018.
