= 2013–2014 Chinese Short Track Speed Skating League =

Multi race national tournament in China

The 2013–2014 Chinese Short Track Speed Skating League was a multi race national tournament over a season for Short track speed skating. The season began on 10 October 2013 and ended on 9 March 2014. The Chinese Short Track Speed Skating League is organized by the Chinese Skating Association.

== Calendar & Results ==
=== Men ===
==== 1. Harbin, October 10 to 13, 2013 ====
Date	Place	Distance	Winner	Second	Third
10 October 2013	Tianrun Skating Gymnasium	9 lap pursuit	Wei Jiguang/ 1:26.325	Song Weilong/ 1:26.468	Ma Qiang/ 1:26.633
11 October 2013	Tianrun Skating Gymnasium	1500 m	Shi Jingnan/ 2:15.639	Jia Daonan/ 2:15.112	Song Weilong/ 2:20.950
12 October 2013	Tianrun Skating Gymnasium	500 m	Liu Songbo/ 41.880	Yang Fei/ 41.985	Song Weilong/ 42.114
13 October 2013	Tianrun Skating Gymnasium	1000 m	Xu Fu/ 1:28.438	Yang Fei/ 1:28.644	Ma Qiang/ 1:28.043
13 October 2013	Tianrun Skating Gymnasium	5000 m relay	Heilongjiang Team 2/ 6:58.998	Army Team 1/ 6:59.216	Changchun/ 6:59.230

==== 2. Harbin, October 17 to 20, 2013 ====
Date	Place	Distance	Winner	Second	Third
17 October 2013	Tianrun Skating Gymnasium	4 lap pursuit	Shi Jingnan/ 37.397	Liu Songbo/ 37.700	Yang Fei/ 37.729
18 October 2013	Tianrun Skating Gymnasium	1500 m	Ren Ziwei/ 2:13.984	Zhang Hongchao/ 2:13.843	Jia Daonan/ 2:24.485
19 October 2013	Tianrun Skating Gymnasium	500 m	Liu Songbo/ 41.996	Nie Xin/ 42.252	Sui Xin/ 42.438
20 October 2013	Tianrun Skating Gymnasium	1000 m	Shi Jingnan/ 1:26.665	Ren Ziwei/ 1:28.229	An Kai/ 1:26.898
20 October 2013	Tianrun Skating Gymnasium	5000 m relay	Heilongjiang Team 2/ 6:59.619	Heilongjiang Team 1/ 7:00.286	Army Team 1/ 7:01.261

==== 3. Changchun, November 14 to 17, 2013 ====
Date	Place	Distance	Winner	Second	Third
17 October 2013	Changchun Ice Training Base Speed Skating Stadium	9 lap pursuit	Shi Jingnan/ 1:26.429	Ma Qiang/ 1:27.040	Wang Xingchun/ 1:27.076
18 October 2013	Changchun Ice Training Base Speed Skating Stadium	1500 m	Jia Daonan/ 2:17.983	Ma Qiang/ 2:15.237	Ma Xingguang/ 2:16.266
19 October 2013	Changchun Ice Training Base Speed Skating Stadium	500 m	Shi Jingnan/ 41.982	Gong Qiuwen/ 42.124	Jia Daonan/ 42.470
20 October 2013	Changchun Ice Training Base Speed Skating Stadium	1000 m	Jia Daonan/ 1:28.361	Chen Guang/ 1:27.187	Wang Xingchun/ 1:28.346
20 October 2013	Changchun Ice Training Base Speed Skating Stadium	5000 m relay	Changchun Team 1/ 7:03.664	Jilin Province Team/ 7:09.550	Army Team 2/ 7:12.627

==== Olympic Selection: Qingdao, November 22 to 24, 2013 ====
Date	Place	Distance	Winner	Second	Third
22 November 2013	Qingdao Sports Center	1500 m	Shi Jingnan/ 2:22.561	Song Weilong/ 2:22.708	Niu Yongqiang/ 2:23.171
23 November 2013	Qingdao Sports Center	500 m	Yu Jiyang/ 42.286	Gong Qiuwen/ 42.300	Liu Songbo/ 42.329
24 November 2013	Qingdao Sports Center	1000 m	Yu Jiyang/ 1:28.821	Shi Jingnan/ 1:28.883	Xu Fu/ 1:29.232
24 November 2013	Qingdao Sports Center	3000 m	Shi Jingnan/ 4:58.628	Yu Jiyang/ 4:58.702	Song Weilong/ 4:58.920
24 November 2013	Qingdao Sports Center	5000 m relay	Heilongjiang/ 7:16.184	Jilin Province/ 7:05.183	Changchun/ 7:06.047
22–24 November 2013	Qingdao Sports Center	Overall	Shi Jingnan/ 97 points	Yu Jiyang/ 94 points	Song Weilong/ 34 points

==== 6. Olympic Warm-up: Shanghai, January 10 to 12, 2014 ====
Date	Place	Distance	Winner	Second	Third
10 January 2014	Shanghai Oriental Sports Center	7 lap pursuit	Wu Dajing/ 1:03.909	Shi Jingnan/ 1:04.699	Yu Jiyang/ 1:05.208
10 January 2014	Shanghai Oriental Sports Center	4 lap pursuit	Shi Jingnan/ 36.847	Wu Dajing/ 36.946	Wang Yang/ 37.246
11 January 2014	Shanghai Oriental Sports Center	1500 m	Shi Jingnan/ 2:11.148	Han Tianyu/ 2:11.396	Chen Dequan/ 2:13.568
11 January 2014	Shanghai Oriental Sports Center	500 m	Wu Dajing/ 40.513	Han Tianyu/ 40.630	Liu Songbo/ 41.024
12 January 2014	Shanghai Oriental Sports Center	1000 m	Ma Qiang/ 1:26.366	Han Tianyu/ 1:25.480	Wu Dajing/ 1:27.405

==== National Junior Championships: Changchun, January 17 to 19, 2013 ====
Date	Place	Distance	Winner	Second	Third
17 January 2014	Changchun Ice Training Base Speed Skating Stadium	1500 m	Ren Ziwei/ 2:19.450	Ma Wei/ 2:19.836	Xu Hongzhi/ 2:21.358
18 January 2014	Changchun Ice Training Base Speed Skating Stadium	500 m	Xu Hongzhi/ 42.989	Ma Wei/ 43.089	Ren Ziwei/ 43.130
19 January 2014	Changchun Ice Training Base Speed Skating Stadium	1000 m	Ren Ziwei/ 1:28.268	Ma Wei/ 1:28.314	Chen Enxue/ 1:28.983
19 January 2014	Changchun Ice Training Base Speed Skating Stadium	Super 1500 m	Ren Ziwei/ 2:34.201	Jia Haidong/ 2:34.880	Xu Hongzhi/ 2:35.270
19 January 2014	Changchun Ice Training Base Speed Skating Stadium	3000 m relay	Army/ 4:17.775	Qingdao/ 4:17.044	Jilin Province Sports School/ 4:18.004
17–19 January 2014	Changchun Ice Training Base Speed Skating Stadium	Overall	Ren Ziwei/ 115 points	Ma Wei/ 65 points	Xu Hongzhi/ 60 points

==== National Championships: Changchun, March 14 to 16, 2013 ====
Date	Place	Distance	Winner	Second	Third
14 March 2014	Changchun Ice Training Base Speed Skating Stadium	1500 m	Ma Wei/ 2:15.194	Zhang Hongchao/ 2:15.977	Liu Songbo/ 2:14.461
15 March 2014	Changchun Ice Training Base Speed Skating Stadium	500 m	Wang Yang/ 42.337	Ma Wei/ 42.350	Ma Qiang/ 42.676
16 March 2014	Changchun Ice Training Base Speed Skating Stadium	1000 m	Zhang Hongchao/ 1:29.770	Xu Hongzhi/ 1:29.842	Wang Yigan/ 1:28.493
16 March 2014	Changchun Ice Training Base Speed Skating Stadium	3000 m	Shao Shuai/ 4:49.481	Ma Wei/ 4:54.875	Zhang Hongchao/ 4:55.438
16 March 2014	Changchun Ice Training Base Speed Skating Stadium	5000 m relay	Heilongjiang/ 7:14.687	Jilin Province/ 7:11.752	Harbin/ 7:14.704
14–16 March 2014	Changchun Ice Training Base Speed Skating Stadium	Overall	Ma Wei/ 76 points	Zhang Hongchao/ 68 points	Shao Shuai/ 42 points

=== Women ===
==== 1. Harbin, October 10 to 13, 2013 ====
Date	Place	Distance	Winner	Second	Third
10 October 2013	Tianrun Skating Gymnasium	9 lap pursuit	Xiao Han/ 1:30.040	Wang Yueyue/ 1:32.221	Han Yutong/ 1:32.324
11 October 2013	Tianrun Skating Gymnasium	1500 m	Xiao Han/ 2:23.749	Han Yutong/ 2:23.419	Tao Jiaying/ 2:28.097
12 October 2013	Tianrun Skating Gymnasium	500 m	Jin Jingzhu/ 45.163	Yang Yang/ 45.081	Xiao Han/ 44.945
13 October 2013	Tianrun Skating Gymnasium	1000 m	Xiao Han/ 1:31.139	Han Yutong/ 1:31.245	Li Hongshuang/ 1:31.800
13 October 2013	Tianrun Skating Gymnasium	3000 m relay	Jilin Province Team 2/ 4:20.048	Army Team 1/ 4:20.085	Changchun/ 4:20.273

==== 2. Harbin, October 17 to 20, 2013 ====
Date	Place	Distance	Winner	Second	Third
17 October 2013	Tianrun Skating Gymnasium	4 lap pursuit	Qu Chunyu/ 40.404	Xiao Han/ 40.703	Jin Jingzhu/ 40.800
18 October 2013	Tianrun Skating Gymnasium	1500 m	Xiao Han/ 2:26.502	Lin Meng/ 2:26.793	Zhang Xiyang/ 2:26.676
19 October 2013	Tianrun Skating Gymnasium	500 m	Jin Jingzhu/ 45.635	Wang Xue/ 45.732	Jin Huiyang/ 45.875
20 October 2013	Tianrun Skating Gymnasium	1000 m	Xiao Han/ 1:34.026	Zhang Qichao/ 1:34.137	Xu Moyuan/ 1:33.766
20 October 2013	Tianrun Skating Gymnasium	3000 m relay	Jilin Province Team 1/ 4:19.084	Jilin Province Team 2/ 4:19.227	Heilongjiang Team 2/ 4:19.438

==== 3. Changchun, November 14 to 17, 2013 ====
Date	Place	Distance	Winner	Second	Third
17 October 2013	Changchun Ice Training Base Speed Skating Stadium	9 lap pursuit	Han Yutong/ 1:31.041	Xiao Han/ 1:31.966	Zhang Xiyang/ 1:32.139
18 October 2013	Changchun Ice Training Base Speed Skating Stadium	1500 m	Han Yutong/ 2:26.633	Tao Jiaying/ 2:23.122	Guo Yihan/ 2:23.041
19 October 2013	Changchun Ice Training Base Speed Skating Stadium	500 m	Zhao Nannan/ 45.072	Han Yutong/ 44.982	Wang Xue/ 45.387
20 October 2013	Changchun Ice Training Base Speed Skating Stadium	1000 m	Han Yutong/ 1:31.862	Guo Yihan/ 1:32.610	Ji Xue/ 1:33.511
20 October 2013	Changchun Ice Training Base Speed Skating Stadium	3000 m relay	Jilin Province Team 2/ 4:20.277	Jilin Province Team 1/ 4:20.300	Army Team 1/ 4:21.564

==== Olympic Selection: Qingdao, November 22 to 24, 2013 ====
Date	Place	Distance	Winner	Second	Third
22 November 2013	Qingdao Sports Center	1500 m	Han Yutong/ 2:28.670	Xiao Han/ 2:28.118	Kong Xue/ 2:27.790
23 November 2013	Qingdao Sports Center	500 m	Lin Yue/ 45.136	Xiao Han/ 45.720	Han Yutong/ 45.014
24 November 2013	Qingdao Sports Center	1000 m	Xiao Han/ 1:32.783	Zhang Xiyang/ 1:31.893	Kong Xue/ 1:32.011
24 November 2013	Qingdao Sports Center	3000 m	Xiao Han/ 5:11.731	Han Yutong/ 5:12.104	Kong Xue/ 5:12.378
24 November 2013	Qingdao Sports Center	3000 m relay	Jilin Province/ 4:20.743	Heilongjiang/ 4:22.359	Army/ 4:22.380
22–24 November 2013	Qingdao Sports Center	Overall	Xiao Han/ 110 points	Han Yutong/ 73 points	Kong Xue/ 39 points

==== 6. Olympic Warm-up: Shanghai, January 10 to 12, 2014 ====
Date	Place	Distance	Winner	Second	Third
10 January 2014	Shanghai Oriental Sports Center	7 lap pursuit	Wang Meng/ 1:07.007	Fan Kexin/ 1:08.624	Liu Qiuhong/ 1:09.245
10 January 2014	Shanghai Oriental Sports Center	4 lap pursuit	Wang Meng/ 38.584	Fan Kexin/ 39.018	Liu Qiuhong/ 39.681
11 January 2014	Shanghai Oriental Sports Center	1500 m	Li Jianrou/ 2:26.772	Han Yutong/ 2:26.847	Kong Xue/ 2:26.853
11 January 2014	Shanghai Oriental Sports Center	500 m	Liu Qiuhong/ 43.767	Fan Kexin/ 43.395	Jin Jingzhu/ 43.973
12 January 2014	Shanghai Oriental Sports Center	1000 m	Li Jianrou/ 1:31.021	Liu Qiuhong/ 1:31.643	Fan Kexin/ 1:32.132

==== National Junior Championships: Changchun, January 17 to 19, 2013 ====
Date	Place	Distance	Winner	Second	Third
17 January 2014	Changchun Ice Training Base Speed Skating Stadium	1500 m	Zhang Xiyang/ 2:21.847	Zhao Xiaoyu/ 2:21.930	Wang Yueyue/ 2:21.995
18 January 2014	Changchun Ice Training Base Speed Skating Stadium	500 m	Zhao Xiaoyu/ 45.907	Lv Xiaotong/ 46.855	Qu Chunyu/ 45.824
19 January 2014	Changchun Ice Training Base Speed Skating Stadium	1000 m	Zhang Xiyang/ 1:33.236	Wang Siyu/ 1:33.342	Li Jingtong/ 1:35.790
19 January 2014	Changchun Ice Training Base Speed Skating Stadium	Super 1500 m	Zhang Xiyang/ 2:27.002	Wang Siyu/ 2:27.116	Zhao Xiaoyu/ 2:27.747
19 January 2014	Changchun Ice Training Base Speed Skating Stadium	3000 m relay	Army/ 4:55.972	-	-
17–19 January 2014	Changchun Ice Training Base Speed Skating Stadium	Overall	Zhang Xiyang/ 102 points	Zhao Xiaoyu/ 68 points	Wang Siyu/ 47 points

==== National Championships: Changchun, March 14 to 16, 2013 ====
Date	Place	Distance	Winner	Second	Third
14 March 2014	Changchun Ice Training Base Speed Skating Stadium	1500 m	Tao Jiaying/ 2:37.103	Guo Yihan/ 2:36.733	Zhang Xiyang/ 2:36.840
15 March 2014	Changchun Ice Training Base Speed Skating Stadium	500 m	Lin Yue/ 45.242	Zhang Xiyang/ 45.706	Jin Huiyang/ 46.066
16 March 2014	Changchun Ice Training Base Speed Skating Stadium	1000 m	Zhang Xiyang/ 1:32.643	Li Hongshuang/ 1:33.151	Wang Xue/ 1:32.777
16 March 2014	Changchun Ice Training Base Speed Skating Stadium	3000 m	Tao Jiaying/ 5:18.117	Guo Yihan/ 5:18.259	Wang Siyu/ 5:18.352
16 March 2014	Changchun Ice Training Base Speed Skating Stadium	3000 m relay	Army/ 4:33.247	Heilongjiang/ 4:33.495	Jilin Province/ 4:33.946
14–16 March 2014	Changchun Ice Training Base Speed Skating Stadium	Overall	Zhang Xiyang/ 71 points	Tao Jiaying/ 68 points	Guo Yihan/ 42 points
