= 2012 World Short Track Speed Skating Championships – Men's 500 metres =

The men's 500 metre at the 2012 World Short Track Speed Skating Championships took place on 10 March 2012, at the Shanghai Oriental Sports Center.

== Results ==
=== Preliminaries ===
Top two athletes from each heat qualified for the heats.

Heat 1

Rank	Athlete	Country	Time	Notes
1	Semen Elistratov	Russia	42.965	Q
2	Edoardo Reggiani	Italy	43.113	Q
3	Lucas Ng	Singapore	48.911	
4	Ievgen Gutenov	Ukraine	1:14.499	

Heat 3

Rank	Athlete	Country	Time	Notes
1	Simon Cho	United States	42.319	Q
2	Yuzo Takamido	Japan	42.956	Q
3	Bence Olah	Hungary	43.496	
4	Selim Tanrikulu	Turkey	44.288	

Heat 5

Rank	Athlete	Country	Time	Notes
1	Liang Wenhao	China	42.207	Q
2	Guillaume Bastille	Canada	42.565	Q
3	Nurbergen Zhumagaziyev	Kazakhstan	43.157	
4	Nihad Bašić	Bosnia and Herzegovina	45.875	

Heat 7

Rank	Athlete	Country	Time	Notes
1	Noh Jin-Kyu	South Korea	42.510	Q
2	Vladislav Bykanov	Israel	43.401	Q
3	Lui Pan To Barton	Hong Kong	43.470	

Heat 9

Rank	Athlete	Country	Time	Notes
1	Kwak Yoon-Gy	South Korea	42.611	Q
2	Jakub Jaworski	Poland	43.055	Q
3	Torsten Kröger	Germany	43.156	

Heat 11

Rank	Athlete	Country	Time	Notes
1	Gong Qiuwen	China	42.543	Q
2	Niels Kerstholt	Netherlands	42.727	Q
3	Jose Cavalli	Switzerland	44.457	
4	Kim Ryong-Chol	North Korea	44.510	

Heat 13

Rank	Athlete	Country	Time	Notes
1	Vladimir Grigorev	Russia	42.401	Q
2	Viktor Knoch	Hungary	42.421	Q
3	Aliaksandr Antanenka	Belarus	46.256	
4	Shung Fan-Yang	Chinese Taipei	47.330	

Heat 2

Rank	Athlete	Country	Time	Notes
1	Olivier Jean	Canada	41.525	Q
2	Jordan Malone	United States	42.848	Q
3	Kiril Pandov	Bulgaria	1:07.795	
4	Tommaso Dotti	Italy		PEN

Heat 4

Rank	Athlete	Country	Time	Notes
1	Chen Dequan	China	42.318	Q
2	Daisuke Uemura	Japan	43.680	Q
3	Jose Ignacio Fazio	Argentina	45.505	
4	Jonathan López	Spain	46.800	

Heat 6

Rank	Athlete	Country	Time	Notes
1	Sin Da-Woon	South Korea	42.469	Q
2	Richard Shoebridge	United Kingdom	42.544	Q
3	Oleksiy Koshelenko	Ukraine	42.790	

Heat 8

Rank	Athlete	Country	Time	Notes
1	Charles Hamelin	Canada	41.704	Q
2	Jack Whelbourne	United Kingdom	42.727	Q
3	Fedor Andreyev	Kazakhstan	45.053	
4	Alvaro Peña	Spain	46.412	

Heat 10

Rank	Athlete	Country	Time	Notes
1	Travis Jayner	United States	43.026	Q
2	Jekabs Saulitis	Latvia	43.264	Q
3	Maksim Siarheyu	Belarus	44.787	
4	Om Chol	North Korea	44.859	

Heat 12

Rank	Athlete	Country	Time	Notes
1	Sjinkie Knegt	Netherlands	42.339	Q
2	Robert Seifert	Germany	42.340	Q
3	Pierre Boda	Australia	42.712	
4	Maxime Chataignier	France	42.736	

Heat 14

Rank	Athlete	Country	Time	Notes
1	Thibaut Fauconnet	France	42.893	Q
2	Lachlan Hay	Australia	43.767	Q
3	Myukerrem Top	Turkey	45.185	
4	Blake Skjellerup	New Zealand	1:13.655	

=== Heats ===
Top two athletes from each heat and the two fastest thirds qualified for the quarterfinals.

Heat 1

Rank	Athlete	Country	Time	Notes
1	Chen Dequan	China	41.727	Q
2	Vladimir Grigorev	Russia	41.998	Q
3	Richard Shoebridge	United Kingdom	42.040	
4	Jekabs Saulitis	Latvia	42.804	

Heat 3

Rank	Athlete	Country	Time	Notes
1	Charles Hamelin	Canada	41.035	Q
2	Gong Qiuwen	China	41.483	Q
3	Robert Seifert	Germany	41.728	q
4	Jakub Jaworski	Poland	42.467	

Heat 5

Rank	Athlete	Country	Time	Notes
1	Noh Jin-Kyu	South Korea	42.581	Q
2	Guillaume Bastille	Canada	42.855	Q
3	Thibaut Fauconnet	France	1:26.160	ADV
4	Jack Whelbourne	United Kingdom		PEN

Heat 7

Rank	Athlete	Country	Time	Notes
1	Liang Wenhao	China	42.023	Q
2	Niels Kerstholt	Netherlands	42.096	Q
3	Vladislav Bykanov	Israel	42.717	
4	Sin Da-Woon	South Korea	1:10.553	

Heat 2

Rank	Athlete	Country	Time	Notes
1	Kwak Yoon-Gy	South Korea	42.105	Q
2	Yuzo Takamido	Japan	42.241	Q
3	Edoardo Reggiani	Italy	42.662	
4	Travis Jayner	United States	58.536	

Heat 4

Rank	Athlete	Country	Time	Notes
1	Olivier Jean	Canada	41.390	Q
2	Jordan Malone	United States	41.532	Q
3	Semen Elistratov	Russia	41.600	q
4	Viktor Knoch	Hungary	42.272	

Heat 6

Rank	Athlete	Country	Time	Notes
1	Simon Cho	United States	41.743	Q
2	Sjinkie Knegt	Netherlands	41.776	Q
3	Daisuke Uemura	Japan	42.621	
4	Lachlan Hay	Australia	46.502	

=== Quarterfinals ===
Top two athletes from each heat qualified for the semifinals.

Heat 1

Rank	Athlete	Country	Time	Notes
1	Robert Seifert	Germany	41.894	Q
2	Simon Cho	United States	42.329	Q
3	Noh Jin-Kyu	South Korea	43.157	
4	Gong Qiuwen	China	53.947	ADV
5	Thibaut Fauconnet	France		PEN

Heat 3

Rank	Athlete	Country	Time	Notes
1	Charles Hamelin	Canada	41.290	Q
2	Niels Kerstholt	Netherlands	41.548	Q
3	Liang Wenhao	China	57.322	ADV
4	Vladimir Grigorev	Russia		PEN

Heat 2

Rank	Athlete	Country	Time	Notes
1	Olivier Jean	Canada	41.381	Q
2	Sjinkie Knegt	Netherlands	42.410	Q
3	Semen Elistratov	Russia	42.560	
4	Yuzo Takamido	Japan	42.668	

Heat 4

Rank	Athlete	Country	Time	Notes
1	Guillaume Bastille	Canada	42.382	Q
2	Kwak Yoon-Gy	South Korea	42.461	Q
3	Jordan Malone	United States	43.392	ADV
4	Chen Dequan	China		PEN

=== Semifinals ===
Top two athletes from each heat qualified for the final.

Heat 1

Rank	Athlete	Country	Time	Notes
1	Charles Hamelin	Canada	41.894	Q
2	Sjinkie Knegt	Netherlands	42.329	Q
3	Gong Qiuwen	China	43.157	
4	Robert Seifert	Germany	53.947	ADV
5	Simon Cho	United States		PEN

Heat 2

Rank	Athlete	Country	Time	Notes
1	Olivier Jean	Canada	41.351	Q
2	Kwak Yoon-Gy	South Korea	41.583	Q
3	Guillaume Bastille	Canada	41.664	
4	Jordan Malone	United States	42.964	
5	Liang Wenhao	China	1:03.588	
6	Niels Kerstholt	Netherlands		PEN

=== Final ===
Rank	Athlete	Country	Time	Notes
1st place, gold medalist(s)	Olivier Jean	Canada	41.077	
2nd place, silver medalist(s)	Charles Hamelin	Canada	41.186	
3rd place, bronze medalist(s)	Kwak Yoon-Gy	South Korea	41.479	
4	Robert Seifert	Germany	41.574	
5	Sjinkie Knegt	Netherlands	59.578	
