= 2014–2015 Chinese Short Track Speed Skating League =

The 2014–2015 Chinese Short Track Speed Skating League is a multi race national tournament over a season for Short track speed skating. The season began on 25 September 2014 and will end on 22 March 2015. The Chinese Short Track Speed Skating League is organized by the Chinese Skating Association.

== Calendar & Results ==
=== Men ===
==== 1. Qitaihe, September 25 to 28, 2014 (National Team Selection) ====
Date	Place	Distance	Winner	Second	Third
25 September 2014	Qitaihe Sports & Exhibition Center	9-lap pursuit	Wu Dajing/ 1:25.291	Chen Guang/ 1:25.935	Han Tianyu/ 1:26.052
26 September 2014	Qitaihe Sports & Exhibition Center	1500 m	Chen Guang/ 2:16.807	Han Tianyu/ 2:16.114	Gong Qiuwen/ 2:16.915
27 September 2014	Qitaihe Sports & Exhibition Center	500 m	Wu Dajing/ 42.013	Liu Songbo/ 42.297	Gong Qiuwen/ 42.055
28 September 2014	Qitaihe Sports & Exhibition Center	1000 m	Chen Dequan/ 1:27.884	Zhang Hongchao/ 1:27.698	Wu Dajing/ 1:27.914
25 September 2014	Qitaihe Sports & Exhibition Center	Overall	Wu Dajing/ 47 Points	Chen Dequan/ 42 Points	Chen Guang/ 34 Points

=== Women ===
==== 1. Qitaihe, September 25 to 28, 2014 (National Team Selection) ====
Date	Place	Distance	Winner	Second	Third
25 September 2014	Qitaihe Sports & Exhibition Center	9-lap pursuit	Fan Kexin/ 1:31.403	Liu Yang/ 1:32.433	Zhang Xiyang/ 1:32.546
26 September 2014	Qitaihe Sports & Exhibition Center	1500 m	Han Yutong/ 2:23.034	Fan Kexin/ 2:23.630	Zhang Xiyang/ 2:23.929
27 September 2014	Qitaihe Sports & Exhibition Center	500 m	Fan Kexin/ 44.025	Lin Yue/ 44.221	Li Hongshuang/ 44.533
28 September 2014	Qitaihe Sports & Exhibition Center	1000 m	Han Yutong/ 1:33.168	Fan Kexin/ 1:32.429	Li Hongshuang/ 1:32.382
25 September 2014	Qitaihe Sports & Exhibition Center	Overall	Fan Kexin/ 76 Points	Han Yutong/ 68 Points	Li Hongshuang/ 34 Points
