= Short-track speed skating at the 2020 Winter Youth Olympics – Girls' 1000 metres =

Girls' 1000 metres at the III Winter Youth Olympic Games
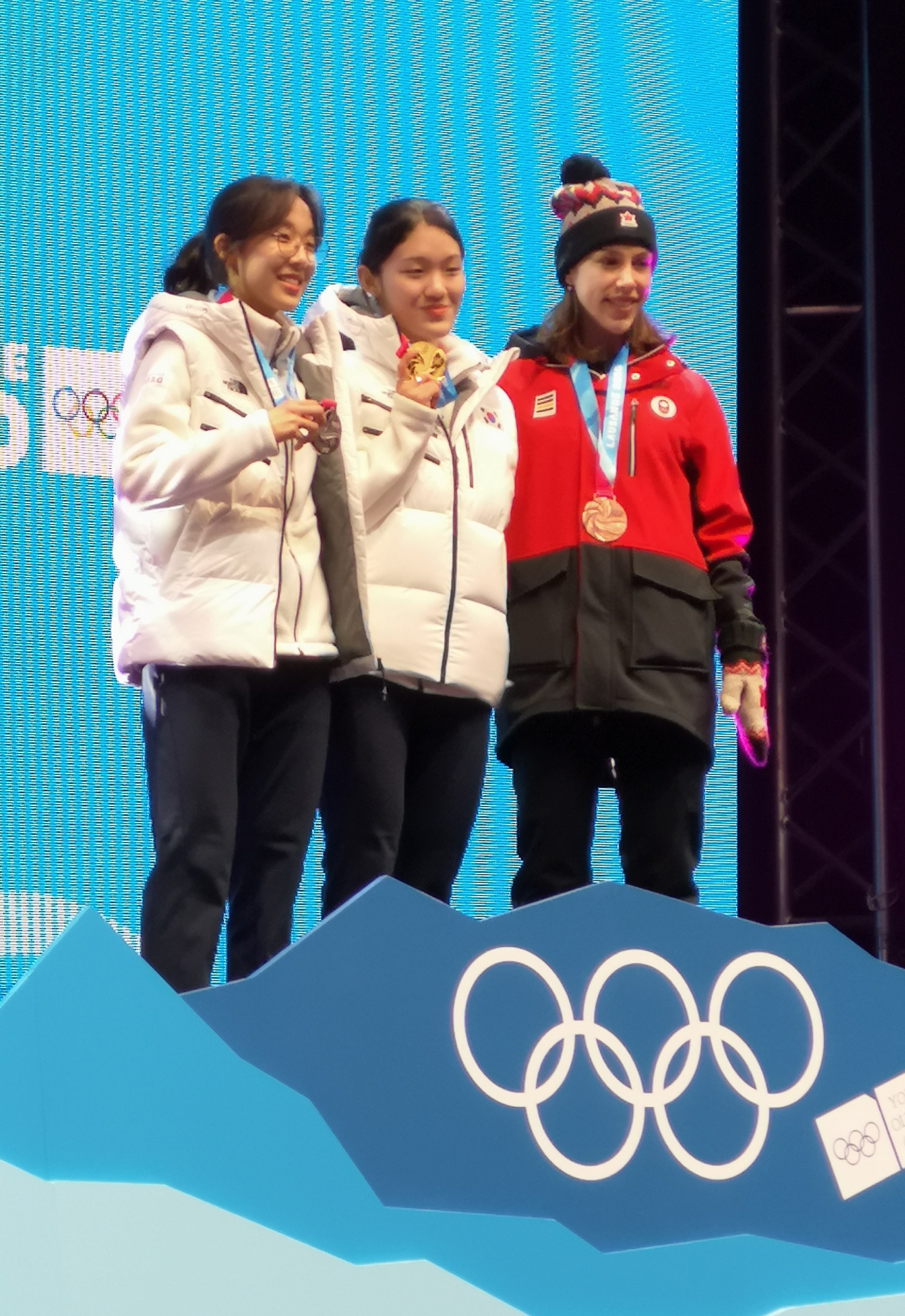
- Venue: Lausanne Skating Arena
- Dates: 18 January
- Competitors: 29 from 25 nations
- Winning time: 1:29.439

Medalists
1st place, gold medalist(s)		Seo Whi-min	South Korea
2nd place, silver medalist(s)		Kim Chan-seo	South Korea
3rd place, bronze medalist(s)		Florence Brunelle	Canada

The girls' 1000 metres in short track speed skating at the 2020 Winter Youth Olympics was held on 18 January at the Lausanne Skating Arena.

== Results ==
=== Heats ===
Q – qualified for the quarterfinals
PEN – penalty

Rank	Heat	Name	Country	Time	Notes
1	1	Seo Whi-min	South Korea	1:53.546	Q
2	1	Elisa Confortola	Italy	1:54.036	Q
3	1	Hanna Sokołowska	Poland	1:54.146	
1	2	Petra Rusnáková	Slovakia	1:36.709	Q
2	2	Barbara Somogyi	Hungary	1:37.283	Q
3	2	Maria Dobosz	Poland	1:37.668	
1	3	Kim Chan-seo	South Korea	1:49.254	Q
2	3	Chang Hui	Chinese Taipei	1:50.122	Q
3	3	Markéta Fajkusová	Czech Republic	2:01.616	
	3	Jenell Berhorst	United States		PEN
1	4	Hailey Choi	United States	1:35.837	Q
2	4	Diede van Oorschot	Netherlands	1:35.857	Q
3	4	Olivia Weedon	Great Britain	1:37.974	
4	4	Petra Jašić	Serbia	1:38.217	
1	5	Michelle Velzeboer	Netherlands	1:44.657	Q
2	5	Anna Jansone	Latvia	1:45.697	Q
3	5	Tetiana Zarvanska	Ukraine	1:45.982	
4	5	Alexia Turunen	Switzerland	1:48.936	
1	6	Haruna Nagamori	Japan	1:47.696	Q
2	6	Anna Ruysschaert	Luxembourg	1:48.993	Q
3	6	Alyssa Pok	Singapore	1:49.094	
4	6	Maja Ivandić	Croatia	1:49.948	
1	7	Iuliia Beresneva	Russia	1:45.050	Q
2	7	Mariya Gorbunova	Kazakhstan	1:46.899	Q
3	7	Dione Tan	Malaysia	1:47.536	
4	7	Betty Moeske	Germany	1:58.705	
1	8	Zhang Chutong	China	1:38.561	Q
1	8	Florence Brunelle	Canada	1:38.671	Q
3	8	Cloé Ollivier	France	1:38.981	

=== Quarterfinals ===
Q – qualified for the semifinals
ADV – advanced

Rank	Heat	Name	Country	Time	Notes
1	1	Florence Brunelle	Canada	1:34.974	Q
2	1	Zhang Chutong	China	1:35.105	Q
3	1	Haruna Nagamori	Japan	1:35.182	
4	1	Anna Ruysschaert	Luxembourg	1:40.537	
1	2	Petra Rusnáková	Slovakia	1:38.442	Q
2	2	Chang Hui	Chinese Taipei	1:39.495	Q
3	2	Kim Chan-seo	South Korea	1:59.433	ADV
4	2	Barbara Somogyi	Hungary	2:11.909	
1	3	Iuliia Beresneva	Russia	1:39.625	Q
2	3	Michelle Velzeboer	Netherlands	1:39.730	Q
3	3	Anna Jansone	Latvia	1:41.144	
4	3	Mariya Gorbunova	Kazakhstan	1:41.491	
1	4	Seo Whi-min	South Korea	1:31.586	Q
2	4	Elisa Confortola	Italy	1:31.679	Q
3	4	Diede van Oorschot	Netherlands	1:33.131	
4	4	Hailey Choi	United States	1:33.787	

=== Semifinals ===
QA – qualified for Final A
QB – qualified for Final B
ADV – advanced

Rank	Heat	Name	Country	Time	Notes
1	1	Petra Rusnáková	Slovakia	1:34.226	QA
2	1	Iuliia Beresneva	Russia	1:34.346	QA
3	1	Elisa Confortola	Italy	1:34.439	QB
4	1	Michelle Velzeboer	Netherlands	1:34.733	QB
1	2	Seo Whi-min	South Korea	1:27.692	QA
2	2	Kim Chan-seo	South Korea	1:27.833	QA
3	2	Chang Hui	Chinese Taipei	1:28.718	QB
4	2	Florence Brunelle	Canada	DNF	ADVA
4	2	Zhang Chutong	China	DNF	QB

=== Final B ===
Rank	Name	Country	Time	Notes
6	Zhang Chutong	China	1:33.580	
7	Michelle Velzeboer	Netherlands	1:33.773	
8	Elisa Confortola	Italy	1:34.061	
9	Chang Hui	Chinese Taipei	1:34.150	

=== Final A ===
The final A was held at 13:41.

Rank	Name	Country	Time	Notes
1st place, gold medalist(s)	Seo Whi-min	South Korea	1:29.439	
2nd place, silver medalist(s)	Kim Chan-seo	South Korea	1:29.538	
3rd place, bronze medalist(s)	Florence Brunelle	Canada	1:30.024	
4	Iuliia Beresneva	Russia	1:30.115	
5	Petra Rusnáková	Slovakia	1:30.221	
