= 2010 World Junior Short Track Speed Skating Championships =

International speed skating competition

- Location: Taipei, Taiwan
- Venue: Taipei Arena
- Dates: 8–10 January
- Competitors: 123

The 2010 World Junior Short Track Speed Skating Championships took place between 8 and 10 January 2010 in Taipei, Taiwan at the Taipei Arena. The World Championships are organised by the ISU which also run world cups and championships in speed skating and figure skating.

== Medal summary ==
=== Medal table ===
Rank	Nation	Gold	Silver	Bronze	Total
1	South Korea	9	4	4	17
2	Canada	1	4	2	7
3	China	0	2	2	4
4	Great Britain	0	0	1	1
4	Japan	0	0	1	1
Totals (5 entries)		10	10	10	30

=== Men's events ===
Event	Gold		Silver		Bronze	
Overall*	Noh Jin-kyu; South Korea	68 pts	Antoine Gélinas-Beaulieu; Canada	63 pts	Park Se-yeong; South Korea	47 pts
500 metres	Mikhail Jeonghan Choi; Canada	42.981	Antoine Gélinas-Beaulieu; Canada	43.048	Wu Dajing; China	43.971
1000 metres	Noh Jin-kyu; South Korea	1:30.776	Antoine Gélinas-Beaulieu; Canada	1:32.998	Park Se-yeong; South Korea	1:44.020
1500 metres	Noh Jin-kyu; South Korea	2:21.631	Kim Sung-han; South Korea	2:21.918	Jack Whelbourne; Great Britain	2:22.699
3000 metre relay	South Korea; Joo Hyung-jun; Kim Sung-han; Noh Jin-kyu; Park Se-yeong	4:06:934	Canada; Mikhail Jeonghan Choi; Pier-Olivier Gagnon; Antoine Gélinas-Beaulieu; Robert Watson	4:15:713	Japan; Yoshiaki Oguro; Keita Watanabe; Shota Uemura; Takashi Yoshida	4:16:320
* First place is awarded 34 points, second is awarded 21 points, third is awarded 13 points, fourth is awarded 8 points, fifth is awarded 5 points, sixth is awarded 3 points, and seventh place is awarded 2 points in each race to determine the overall world champion, except for the relays which do not count for individual scores.

=== Women's events ===
Event	Gold		Silver		Bronze	
Overall*	Choi Ji-hyun; South Korea	115 pts	Lee Mi-yeon; South Korea	68 pts	Song Jae-won; South Korea	42 pts
500 metres	Choi Ji-hyun; South Korea	45.928	Fan Kexin; China	45.934	Li Dan; China	46.653
1000 metres	Choi Ji-hyun; South Korea	1:34:583	Lee Mi-yeon; South Korea	1:34:631	Laurie Marceau; Canada	1:52.751
1500 metres	Choi Ji-hyun; South Korea	2:27:340	Song Jae-won; South Korea	2:27:433	Lee Mi-yeon; South Korea	2:27:627
3000 metre relay	South Korea; Choi Ji-hyun; Hwang Hyun-sun; Lee Mi-yeon; Song Jae-won	4:23:689	China; Fan Kexin; Li Dan; Lin Meng; Zhang Shaoyang	4:24:697	Canada; Sabrina Bourgela; Laurie Marceau; Keri Morrison; Kristy Shoebridge	4:29:147
* First place is awarded 34 points, second is awarded 21 points, third is awarded 13 points, fourth is awarded 8 points, fifth is awarded 5 points, sixth is awarded 3 points, and seventh place is awarded 2 points in each race to determine the overall world champion, except for the relays which do not count for individual scores.

== See also ==
- List of sporting events in Taiwan
- Short track speed skating
- World Junior Short Track Speed Skating Championships
