= Florence Brunelle =

Canadian speed skater (born 2003)

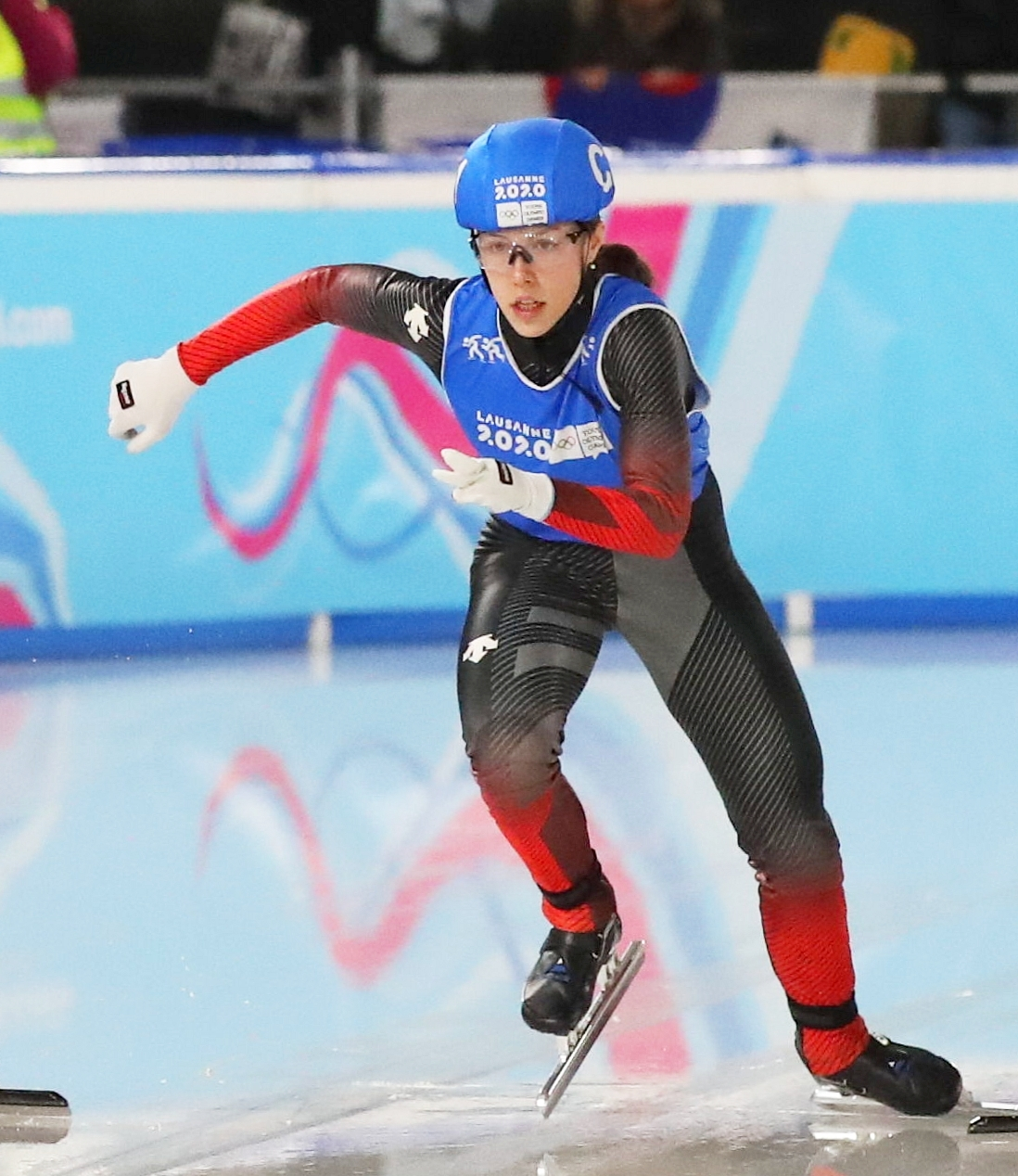
- Brunelle at the 2020 Winter Youth Olympics

Personal information
- Nationality: Canadian
- Born: December 20, 2003 (age 22) Trois-Rivières, Quebec, Canada
- Height: 1.73 m (5 ft 8 in)

Sport
- Country: Canada
- Sport: Short track speed skating
Medal record
Women's short track speed skating
Representing Canada
Olympic Games
Silver medal – second place	2026 Milano Cortina	Mixed 2000 m relay
Bronze medal – third place	2026 Milano Cortina	3000 m relay
World Championships
Gold medal – first place	2025 Beijing	3000 m relay
Gold medal – first place	2025 Beijing	2000 m mixed relay
Silver medal – second place	2022 Montreal	3000 m relay
Silver medal – second place	2026 Montreal	2000 m mixed relay
Winter Youth Olympics
Bronze medal – third place	2020 Lausanne	500 m
Bronze medal – third place	2020 Lausanne	1000 m
World Junior Championships
Gold medal – first place	2022 Gdańsk	500 m
Gold medal – first place	2022 Gdańsk	1000 m
Gold medal – first place	2022 Gdańsk	3000 m relay
Gold medal – first place	2023 Dresden	500 m
Silver medal – second place	2020 Bormio	500 m
Silver medal – second place	2020 Bormio	1500 m
Silver medal – second place	2023 Dresden	1000 m
Silver medal – second place	2023 Dresden	1000 m

Florence Brunelle (French pronunciation: [flɔʁɑ̃s bʁynɛl]; born December 20, 2003) is a Canadian short-track speed skater. She is a two-time Winter Olympic medalist, two-time World champion, and four-time World Junior champion.

== Career ==
=== Junior ===
Brunelle competed at the third Winter Youth Olympics held in Lausanne, Switzerland. Brunelle would go onto win the bronze medal in both individual events contested: the 500 metres and 1000 metres.

Later in the season at the 2020 World Junior Short Track Speed Skating Championships in Bormio, Italy, Brunelle won two silver medals in the 500 metres and 1500 metres. At the 2022 World Junior Short Track Speed Skating Championships in Gdańsk, Poland, Brunelle improved on her silver medal performance in the 500 metres, by winning the gold and becoming World Junior Champion. Brunelle would also win the gold in the 1000 metres event and was part of the 3000 metres relay gold medal winning team.

=== Senior ===
Brunelle made her senior debut at the 2021 World Short Track Speed Skating Championships in Dordrecht, Netherlands. Brunelle made her World Cup debut in the 2021–22 season, where she won two silver medals in the women's 3000 m relay and the mixed relay.

==== Winter Olympics ====
On January 18, 2022, Brunelle was named to Canada's 2022 Olympic team. At the Winter Olympics, Brunelle advanced to the quarterfinals in her only individual event the 500 metres, while finishing fourth in the 3000 metres relay and sixth in the 2000 metres mixed relay.

On December 17, 2025, Brunelle was named to Canada's 2026 Olympic team. In February 2026, she won a silver medal in the mixed 2000-metre relay.
