= 2012 World Junior Short Track Speed Skating Championships =

International speed skating competition

- The logo of the 2012 World Junior Short Track Speed Skating Championships
- Location: Melbourne, Australia
- Venue: Medibank Icehouse
- Dates: 24–26 February
- Competitors: 130 from 28 nations

The 2012 World Junior Short Track Speed Skating Championships took place between 24 and 26 February in Melbourne, Australia at the Medibank Icehouse. This is the first time which the Championship was held during the summer and in the Southern Hemisphere. The World Championships are organised by the ISU which also run world cups and championships in speed skating and figure skating.

== Medal summary ==
=== Medal table ===
Rank	Nation	Gold	Silver	Bronze	Total
1	South Korea	10	5	3	18
2	China	0	4	3	7
3	Lithuania	0	1	0	1
4	United States	0	0	2	2
5	Canada	0	0	1	1
5	Russia	0	0	1	1
Totals (6 entries)		10	10	10	30

=== Men's events ===
Event	Gold		Silver		Bronze	
Overall	Park Se-yeong; South Korea	84 pts	Lee Hyo-been; South Korea	81 pts	Han Tianyu; China	63 pts
500 metres	Lee Hyo-been; South Korea	42.108	Han Tianyu; China	42.308	Alexandre St-Jean; Canada	42.461
1000 metres	Park Se-yeong; South Korea	1:27.571	Chen Dequan; China	1:27.596	Lee Hyo-been; South Korea	1:27.685
1500 metres	Park Se-yeong; South Korea	2:20.059	Lee Hyo-been; South Korea	2:20.087	John-Henry Krueger; United States	2:21.480
3000 metre relay	South Korea; Kim Do-kyoum; Kim Joon-chun; Lee Hyo-been; Park Se-yeong	4:02.440	China; Chen Dequan; Chen Guang; Han Tianyu; Xu Fu	4:02.922	United States; Adam Callister; Claude Gilbert; John-Henry Krueger; James Rodowsky	4:06.420

=== Women's events ===
Event	Gold		Silver		Bronze	
Overall	Shim Suk-hee; South Korea	115 pts	Hwang Hyun-sun; South Korea	76 pts	Ahn Se-jung; South Korea	42 pts
500 metres	Shim Suk-hee; South Korea	44.202	Agnė Sereikaitė; Lithuania	44.998	Xue Wang; China	45.035
1000 metres	Shim Suk-hee; South Korea	1:30.208; JWR	Hwang Hyun-sun; South Korea	1:30.314	Xue Wang; China	1:30.465
1500 metres	Shim Suk-hee; South Korea	2:21.987	Hwang Hyun-sun; South Korea	2:22.069	Ahn Se-jung; South Korea	2:22.183
3000 metre relay	South Korea; Ahn Se-jung; Cheon Hee-jung; Hwang Hyun-sun; Shim Suk-hee	4:14.800	China; Guo Yihan; Han Yutong; Ji Xue; Wang Xue	4:17.711	Russia; Ekaterina Baranok; Ekaterina Strelkova; Yulia Kichapova; Evgeniya Zakharova	4:23.275

== Participating nations ==
Athletes from 28 countries participated in these championships, which is a decrease of five nations from the last year's competition. Malaysia and Singapore made their debut appearance.

- Argentina (1)
- Australia (7)
- Austria (2)
- Belgium (1)
- Bulgaria (1)
- Canada (8)
- China (8)
- Chinese Taipei (6)
- Czech Republic (2)
- Germany (4)
- Great Britain (4)
- Hong Kong (1)
- Hungary (7)
- Italy (8)
- Japan (8)
- Kazakhstan (8)
- Latvia (2)
- Lithuania (1)
- Malaysia (6)
- Netherlands (6)
- New Zealand (4)
- Poland (2)
- Romania (3)
- Russia (8)
- Singapore (2)
- South Korea (8)
- Turkey (4)
- United States (8)

== See also ==
- Short track speed skating
- World Junior Short Track Speed Skating Championships
