= Choi Ji-hyun =

South Korean speed skater

Personal information
- Born: 9 March 1994 (age 32) Cheongju, Chungcheongbuk-do, South Korea
- Height: 1.66 m (5 ft 5 1/2 in)
- Weight: 56 kg (123 lb)

Sport
- Country: South Korea
- Sport: Short track speed skating
Medal record
Women's short track speed skating
Representing South Korea
World Championships
Gold medal – first place	2019 Sofia	3000 m relay
World Junior Championships
Gold medal – first place	2010 Taipei	1500m
Gold medal – first place	2010 Taipei	500m
Gold medal – first place	2010 Taipei	1000m
Gold medal – first place	2010 Taipei	Overall
Gold medal – first place	2010 Taipei	2000m relay
Bronze medal – third place	2010 Taipei	1500m SF
Winter Universiade
Gold medal – first place	2013 Trentino	3000m relay

- Choi Ji-hyun
- Hangul: 최지현
- Hanja: 崔智賢
- RR: Choe Jihyeon
- MR: Ch'oe Chihyŏn

Choi Ji-hyun (born March 9, 1994) is a South Korean short track speed skater.

== Career ==
Choi won four distances and the overall classification at the 2010 World Junior Championships in Taipei. She was the first South Korean ever to win a gold medal in the women's 500 metres in the World Junior Championships.
