= 2022 World Junior Short Track Speed Skating Championships =

2022 speed skating competition in Gdańsk, Poland

- Venue: Gdańsk, Poland
- Dates: 4–6 March
- Competitors: 142 from 31 nations

The 2022 World Junior Short Track Speed Skating Championships took place between 4 and 6 March 2022 in Hala Olivia in Gdańsk, Poland.

On 1 March 2022, following IOC recommendation, the ISU Council based on the ISU Constitution agreed with immediate effect and until further notice that no skaters belonging to the ISU Members in Russia and Belarus should be invited or allowed to participate in International ice skating competitions including ISU championships and other ISU events.

== Schedule ==
All times are CET (UTC+01:00).

Date	Time	Event
4 March	9:50	Qualifying Rounds 1500, 500, 1000 meters Women & Men; Qualifying Rounds 3000 meters Relay Women & Men
5 March	9:30	Ranking Finals 1500, 500 meters Women & Men
5 March	14:02	Finals 1500 meters Women & Men; Heats, Quarter-Finals, Semi-Finals & Finals; 500 meters Women & Men; Semi-Finals 3000 meters Relay Women; Semi-Finals 3000 meters Relay Men
6 March	9:30	Ranking Finals 1000 meters Women & Men
6 March	14:02	Heats, Quarter-Finals, Semi-Finals & Finals 1000 meters Women & Men; Finals 3000 meters Relay Women; Finals 3000 meters Relay Men

== Medal summary ==
=== Medal table ===
Rank	Nation	Gold	Silver	Bronze	Total
1	South Korea	3	3	3	9
2	Canada	3	1	0	4
3	Netherlands	1	2	2	5
4	Italy	1	0	0	1
5	Hungary	0	2	2	4
6	France	0	0	1	1
Totals (6 entries)		8	8	8	24

=== Medalists ===
==== Men ====
Event	Gold		Silver		Bronze	
500 metres	Jenning de Boo; Netherlands	41.319	Bence Nógrádi; Hungary	41.385	Péter Jászapáti; Hungary	41.492
1000 metres	Kim Min-seo; South Korea	1:26.929	Park Geon-nyeong; South Korea	1:27.020	Lee Do-gyu; South Korea	1:27.200
1500 metres	Park Geon-nyeong; South Korea	2:21.408	Lee Do-gyu; South Korea	2:21.509	Kim Min-seo; South Korea	2:21.601
3000 metres relay	Italy; Piero Castellazzi; Alessandro Loreggia; Davide Oss Chemper; Lorenzo Previtali	4:06.895	Hungary; Ádám Granasztói; Péter Jászapáti; Dominik Major; Bence Nógrádi	4:06.986	France; Étienne Bastier; Noah Buffet; Tawan Thomas; Arthur Vanbesien	4:07.039

==== Women ====
Event	Gold		Silver		Bronze	
500 metres	Florence Brunelle; Canada	44.473	Ann-Sophie Bachand; Canada	44.559	Michelle Velzeboer; Netherlands	44.659
1000 metres	Florence Brunelle; Canada	1:32.000	Kim Gil-li; South Korea	1:32.072	Diede van Oorschot; Netherlands	1:32.298
1500 metres	Kim Gil-li; South Korea	2:24.688	Angel Daleman; Netherlands	2:25.612	Jang Yeon-jae; South Korea	2:25.723
3000 metres relay	Canada; Ann-Sophie Bachand; Anne-Clara Belley; Florence Brunelle; Ayisha Miao	4:19.363	Netherlands; Angel Daleman; Zoë Deltrap; Diede van Oorschot; Michelle Velzeboer	4:19.469	Hungary; Viktória Albert; Maja Somodi; Dóra Szigeti; Diána Laura Végi	4:19.518

== Participants ==
A total of 153 competitors and 14 substitutes from the national teams of the following 31 countries was registered to compete at 2022 World Junior Short Track Speed Skating Championships.

- Australia (1)
- Austria (1)
- Belgium (4)
- Bosnia and Herzegovina (1)
- Bulgaria (6)
- Canada (8)
- Croatia (3)
- Czech Republic (3)
- France (6)
- Germany (8)
- Great Britain (2)
- Hungary (8)
- Italy (8)
- Kazakhstan (8)
- Latvia (6)
- Lithuania (3)
- Malaysia (1)
- Netherlands (8)
- Norway (7)
- Philippines (1)
- Poland (8)
- Serbia (1)
- Singapore (4)
- Slovakia (3)
- Slovenia (4)
- South Korea (8)
- Switzerland (1)
- Thailand (2)
- Turkey (8)
- Ukraine (2)
- United States (8)
