= 2016 World Junior Short Track Speed Skating Championships =

International speed skating competition

- Location: Sofia, Bulgaria
- Venue: Winter Sports Palace
- Dates: 29–31 January
- Competitors: 191 from 39 nations

The 2016 World Junior Short Track Speed Skating Championships took place from 29 to 31 January 2016 in Sofia, Bulgaria.

== Medal summary ==
=== Medal table ===
Rank	Nation	Gold	Silver	Bronze	Total
1	China	8	1	4	13
2	South Korea	1	7	3	11
3	Netherlands	1	1	1	3
4	Hungary	0	1	0	1
5	Canada	0	0	1	1
5	Russia	0	0	1	1
Totals (6 entries)		10	10	10	30

=== Men's events ===
The results of the Championships:

Event	Gold		Silver		Bronze	
500 metres	Xu Hongzhi (CHN)	41.558	Shaoang Liu (HUN)	41.594	Steven Dubois (CAN)	41.719
1000 metres	Ren Ziwei (CHN)	1:25.191	Lim Yong-jin (KOR)	1:25.287	Ma Wei (CHN)	1:25.347
1500 metres	Lim Yong-jin (KOR)	2:29.887	Ren Ziwei (CHN)	2:30.102	Kim Si-un (KOR)	2:30.173
3000 metre relay	China; Ma Wei; Ren Ziwei; Xu Hongzhi; Yu Wei	3:59.809 WR	South Korea; Hwang Dae-heon; Kim Si-un; Lee Seong-hun; Lim Yong-jin	3:59.921	Russia; Denis Ayrapetyan; Daniil Eybog; Artem Kozlov; Pavel Sitnikov	4:03.466
Overall Classification	Ren Ziwei (CHN)	90 pts.	Lim Yong-jin (KOR)	68 pts.	Ma Wei (CHN)	47 pts.

=== Women's events ===
Event	Gold		Silver		Bronze	
500 metres	Qu Chunyu (CHN)	43.827	Lee Yu-bin (KOR)	43.930	Zang Yize (CHN)	44.407
1000 metres	Qu Chunyu (CHN)	1:33.437	Lee Su-youn (KOR)	1:33.635	Lee Yu-bin (KOR)	1:33.762
1500 metres	Suzanne Schulting (NED)	2:32.532	Lee Su-youn (KOR)	2:32.532	Qu Chunyu (CHN)	2:32.677
3000 metre relay	China; Li Jinyu; Qu Chunyu; Yu Miaohui; Zang Yize	4:15.124	South Korea; Lee Su-youn; Lee Yu-bin; Park Jung-hyun; Yoon Jung-min	4:15.405	Netherlands; Avalon Aardoom; Tineke den Dulk; Gioya Lancee; Suzanne Schulting	4:17.670
Overall Classification	Qu Chunyu (CHN)	86 pts.	Suzanne Schulting (NED)	79 pts.	Lee Yu-bin (KOR)	55 pts.

== Participating nations ==
- Australia (4)
- Austria (5)
- Belarus (8)
- Belgium (5)
- Bosnia and Herzegovina (3)
- Bulgaria (5)
- Canada (8)
- China (8)
- Chinese Taipei (5)
- Colombia (1)
- Croatia (4)
- Czech Republic (4)
- France (8)
- Germany (6)
- Great Britain (2)
- Hungary (8)
- Hong Kong (1)
- India (1)
- Italy (8)
- Japan (8)
- Kazakhstan (8)
- Latvia (4)
- Lithuania (1)
- Malaysia (2)
- Netherlands (8)
- New Zealand (3)
- Norway (1)
- Poland (8)
- Romania (5)
- Russia (8)
- Serbia (1)
- Slovakia (6)
- Slovenia (1)
- Spain (4)
- South Korea (8)
- Sweden (2)
- Turkey (4)
- Ukraine (7)
- United States (8)

== See also ==
- Short track speed skating
- World Junior Short Track Speed Skating Championships
