= 2020 World Junior Short Track Speed Skating Championships =

International speed skating competition

- Venue: Bormio, Italy
- Dates: 31 January – 2 February
- Competitors: 173 from 37 nations

The 2020 World Junior Short Track Speed Skating Championships took place between 31 January and 2 February 2020 in Bormio, Italy.

== Medal summary ==
=== Medal table ===
* Host nation (Italy)

Rank	Nation	Gold	Silver	Bronze	Total
1	South Korea (KOR)	5	2	0	7
2	Netherlands (NED)	2	0	0	2
3	China (CHN)	1	0	3	4
4	Russia (RUS)	0	3	2	5
5	Canada (CAN)	0	2	0	2
6	United States (USA)	0	1	1	2
7	Italy (ITA)*	0	0	1	1
7	Japan (JPN)	0	0	1	1
Totals (8 entries)		8	8	8	24

=== Men's events ===
Event	Gold		Silver		Bronze	
500 metres	Lee Jeong-min; South Korea	42.063	Vladimir Balbekov; Russia	42.171	Sun Long; China	1:03.327
1000 metres	Sun Long; China	1:34.108	Ahn Hyun-jun; South Korea	1:34.111	Vladimir Balbekov; Russia	1:34.647
1500 metres	Kim Tae-sung; South Korea	2:31.495	Ahn Hyun-jun; South Korea	2:31.584	Zhang Tianyi; China	2:31.671
3000 metre relay	South Korea; Ahn Hyun-jun; Jang Sung-woo; Kim Tae-sung; Lee Jeong-min	3:55.494; WR	Russia; Vladimir Balbekov; Konstantin Ivliev; Viacheslav Karpov; Daniil Krasnokutskiy	3:55.982	Japan; Ibuki Hayashi; Ota Ishii; Shogo Miyata; Takumi Wada	4:12.437

=== Women's events ===
Event	Gold		Silver		Bronze	
500 metres	Xandra Velzeboer; Netherlands	43.924	Florence Brunelle; Canada	44.383	Corinne Stoddard; United States	44.760
1000 metres	Kim Gil-li; South Korea	1:32.069	Corinne Stoddard; United States	1:32.924	Anna Matveeva; Russia	1:33.292
1500 metres	Kim Geon-hee; South Korea	2:38.292	Florence Brunelle; Canada	2:38.507	Li Xuan; China	2:38.616
3000 metre relay	Netherlands; Georgie Dalrymple; Anne Floor Otter; Xandra Velzeboer; Marijn Wiersma	4:12.019; JWR	Russia; Yuliia Beresneva; Sofia Boytsova; Daria Krasnokutskaia; Anna Matveeva	4:13.288	Italy; Chiara Betti; Elisa Confortola; Viola De Piazza; Katia Filippi	4:21.298

== Participating nations ==
- Australia (5)
- Austria (2)
- Belarus (8)
- Belgium (5)
- Bulgaria (2)
- Canada (8)
- China (7)
- Chinese Taipei (2)
- Croatia (2)
- Czech Republic (3)
- France (6)
- Germany (5)
- Great Britain (5)
- Hong Kong (3)
- Hungary (8)
- India (2)
- Ireland (1)
- Italy (8)
- Japan (8)
- Kazakhstan (8)
- Latvia (4)
- Lithuania (1)
- Malaysia (3)
- Netherlands (8)
- New Zealand (1)
- Philippines (1)
- Poland (8)
- Russia (8)
- Serbia (3)
- Singapore (3)
- Slovakia (2)
- South Korea (8)
- Switzerland (2)
- Thailand (3)
- Turkey (4)
- Ukraine (8)
- United States (8)
