= Xiao Han (speed skater) =

Chinese speed skater

Personal information
- Born: September 7, 1994 (age 31)

Sport
- Country: China
- Sport: Short track speed skating

Achievements and titles
- Personal bests: 500m: 44.915 (2014); 1000m: 1:31.055 (2011); 1500m: 2:21.110 (2011); 3000m: 5:18.276 (2011)
Medal record
Women's short track speed skating
Representing China
World Championships
Gold medal – first place	2011 Sheffield	3000 m relay
Gold medal – first place	2012 Shanghai	3000 m relay
World Team Championships
Silver medal – second place	2011 Warsaw	Team
World Junior Championships
Silver medal – second place	2013 Warsaw	500 m
Silver medal – second place	2013 Warsaw	3000 m relay
Bronze medal – third place	2011 Courmayeur	1000 m
Bronze medal – third place	2014 Erzurum	3000 m relay
Bronze medal – third place	2011 Courmayeur	3000 m relay

Xiao Han (Chinese: 肖涵: born September 7, 1994, in Jilin) is a Chinese female short track speed skater. She won the gold medal for 777 meters in the 12th China National Winter Games in 2012.
