= Lin Meng =

Chinese speed skater

Personal information
- Born: July 7, 1993 (age 33) Jiamusi, Heilongjiang, China

Sport
- Country: China
- Sport: Short track speed skating

Achievements and titles
- Personal bests: 500m: 45.524 (2011); 1000m: 1:32.377 (2010); 1500m: 2:25.558 (2011)
Medal record
Women's short track speed skating
Representing China
World Junior Championships
Silver medal – second place	2010 Taipei	3000 m relay
Bronze medal – third place	2011 Courmayeur	500 m
Bronze medal – third place	2011 Courmayeur	1500 m
Bronze medal – third place	2011 Courmayeur	3000 m relay
Winter Universiade
Gold medal – first place	2015 Granada	3000 m relay

Lin Meng (Chinese: 林孟, born on July 7, 1993, in Jiamusi, Heilongjiang) is a Chinese female short track speed skater.
