= Diede van Oorschot =

Speed skater from the Netherlands

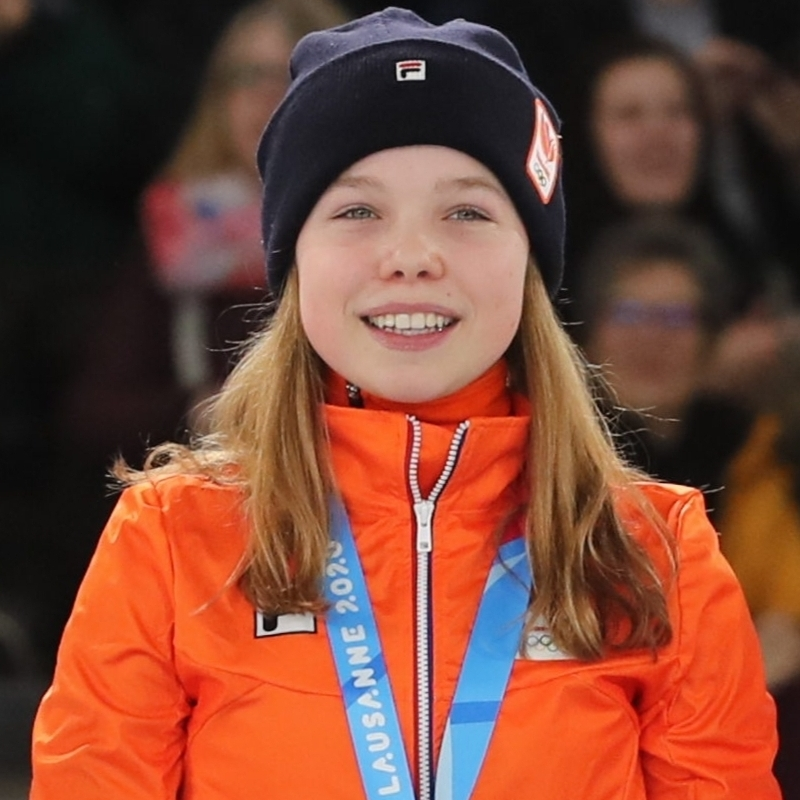
- Van Oorschot at the 2020 Winter Youth Olympics

Personal information
- Nationality: Dutch
- Born: 11 December 2003 (age 22) Utrecht, Netherlands

Sport
- Country: Netherlands
- Sport: Short track speed skating
Medal record
Women's short-track speed skating
Representing the Netherlands
World Championships
Gold medal – first place	2026 Montreal	3000 m relay
Bronze medal – third place	2025 Beijing	3000 m relay
European Championships
Gold medal – first place	2024 Gdańsk	3000 m relay
Gold medal – first place	2026 Tilburg	3000 m relay
Silver medal – second place	2025 Dresden	2000 m mixed relay
World Junior Championships
Silver medal – second place	2022 Gdańsk	3000 m relay
Bronze medal – third place	2022 Gdansk	1000 m
Representing Mixed-NOCs
Youth Olympic Games
Gold medal – first place	2020 Lausanne	Mixed team relay

Diede van Oorschot (born 11 December 2003) is a Dutch short track speed skater. She was part of the Dutch relay team at the 2024 European Championships that obtained a gold medal.

== Career ==
Van Oorschot won the Dutch National Junior title in 2019 and was selected for the Youth Olympic Games in 2020, obtaining a gold medal in the mixed team relay with an NOC team. In 2022 Van Oorschot won a bronze medal in the 1000 meter event at the World Junior Championships. Since 2023 she is part of the Dutch national team. She participated in the women's relay team that obtained a gold medal in the 2024 European Championships and in the mixed relay team that won a silver medal in the 2025 European Championships.
