= Wang Xue =

Chinese speed skater

Personal information
- Born: June 14, 1993 (age 33)
- Height: 1.65 m (5 ft 5 in)
- Weight: 55 kg (121 lb; 8.7 st)

Sport
- Country: China
- Sport: Short track speed skating

Achievements and titles
- Personal best(s): 500m: 44.571 (2013); 1000m: 1:30.465 (2012); 1500m: 2:27.058 (2012)
Medal record
Women's short track speed skating
Representing China
World Junior Championships
Silver medal – second place	2012 Melbourne	3000 m relay
Bronze medal – third place	2012 Melbourne	500 m
Bronze medal – third place	2012 Melbourne	1000 m
Winter Universiade
Gold medal – first place	2013 Trentino	500 m

Wang Xue (Chinese: 王雪, born on June 14, 1993, in Jilin) is a Chinese female short track speed skater. She won the gold medal for Ladies' 500 meters in 2013 Winter Universiade, Trentino.
