= 2011 World Junior Short Track Speed Skating Championships =

International speed skating competition

- Location: Courmayeur, Italy
- Dates: 25–27 February
- Competitors: 159 from 33 nations

The 2011 World Junior Short Track Speed Skating Championships took place between 25 and 27 February 2011 in Courmayeur, Italy at the Forum Sport Center ice rink. The World Championships are organised by the ISU which also run world cups and championships in speed skating and figure skating.

This event was a qualification for the short track speed skating events at the 2012 Winter Youth Olympics.

== Medal summary ==
=== Medal table ===
* Host nation (Italy)

Rank	Nation	Gold	Silver	Bronze	Total
1	South Korea	5	4	1	10
2	Italy*	2	0	1	3
3	Great Britain	1	2	0	3
4	China	1	1	6	8
5	France	1	0	0	1
6	Canada	0	1	1	2
7	Japan	0	1	0	1
7	Netherlands	0	1	0	1
Totals (8 entries)		10	10	9	29

=== Men's events ===
Event	Gold		Silver		Bronze	
Overall	Seo Yi-ra; South Korea	89 pts	Jack Whelbourne; Great Britain	76 pts	Wu Dajing; China	40 pts
500 metres	Liu Songbo; China	43.065	Wu Dajing; China	50.424	No Medal Awarded*	-
1000 metres	Jack Whelbourne; Great Britain	1:26.049	Seo Yi-ra; South Korea	1:26.086	Shi Jingnan; China	1:26.312
1500 metres	Seo Yi-ra; South Korea	2:20.410	Jack Whelbourne; Great Britain	2:20.592	Lee Hyo-been; South Korea	2:20.663
3000 metre relay	France; Thibault Crolet; Vincent Giannitrapani; Sébastien Lepape; Alexis Yang	4:08.911	Japan; Minto Sekai; Keita Watanabe; Hiroki Yokoyama; Masashi Yoshikawa	4:09.923	Canada; Patrick Duffy; Pier-Olivier Gagnon; Maxime Gauthier; Alexandre St-Jean	4:15.867

- No medal was awarded in the men's 500 metre event, because the other two skaters were disqualified.

=== Women's events ===
Event	Gold		Silver		Bronze	
Overall	Cheon Hee-jung; South Korea	68 pts	Ahn Se-jung; South Korea	68 pts	Martina Valcepina; Italy	50 pts
500 metres	Martina Valcepina; Italy	45.136	Lara van Ruijven; Netherlands	45.470	Lin Meng; China	45.622
1000 metres	Ahn Se-jung; South Korea	1:31.336	Noh Do-hee; South Korea	1:31.446	Xiao Han; China	1:31.527
1500 metres	Cheon Hee-jung; South Korea	2:28.227	Ahn Se-jung; South Korea	2:28.316	Lin Meng; China	2:28.858
3000 metre relay	Italy; Yelenia Tota; Arianna Valcepina; Martina Valcepina; Elena Viviani	4:20.004	Canada; Laurie Marceau; Cynthia Mascitto; Ann-Véronique Michaud; Courtney Shmyr	4:20.166	China; Jin Jingzhu; Lin Meng; Xiao Han; Zhang Shaoyang	4:32.995

== Participating nations ==
159 athletes from 33 countries participated.

- Argentina (2)
- Australia (6)
- Austria (2)
- Belgium (4)
- Belarus (4)
- Bosnia and Herzegovina (3)
- Bulgaria (7)
- Canada (8)
- China (8)
- Chinese Taipei (2)
- Croatia (5)
- Czech Republic (3)
- France (5)
- Germany (7)
- Great Britain (4)
- Hong Kong (1)
- Hungary (8)
- India (1)
- Italy (8)
- Japan (8)
- Kazakhstan (7)
- Latvia (4)
- Lithuania (1)
- Netherlands (5)
- New Zealand (1)
- Poland (6)
- Romania (6)
- Russia (8)
- Slovakia (2)
- South Korea (8)
- Sweden (1)
- Ukraine (6)
- United States (8)

== See also ==
- Short track speed skating
- World Junior Short Track Speed Skating Championships
