= Richard Shoebridge =

British speed skater

Personal information
- Nickname: Shoei
- Nationality: British
- Born: 12 August 1985 (age 40) Johannesburg, South Africa
- Height: 175 cm (5 ft 9 in) (2014)
- Weight: 75 kg (165 lb) (2014)

Sport
- Country: United Kingdom
- Sport: Short track speed skating
- Club: Mohawks Ice Racing Club

Achievements and titles
- Personal best(s): 500m: 40.819 (2014); 1000m: 1:25.175 (2013); 1500m: 2:16.878 (2011)
Medal record
Men's short track speed skating
Representing United Kingdom
World Championships
| Bronze medal – third place | 2014 Montreal | 5000 m relay |

Richard Shoebridge (born 12 August 1985 in Johannesburg, South Africa) is a British short track speed skater who competed at the 2014 Winter Olympics.

Shoebridge was part of the British 5,000m relay team that broke the world record in February 2011.
