= Chinese Short Track Speed Skating League =

Chinese Short Track Speed Skating League is the series of national competitions organized by the Chinese Skating Association. It starts in October in every season till March in the next year. It opens to all registered short track speed skaters in China, and those national team skaters who compete in international competitions (for example: ISU Short Track Speed Skating World Cup, World Short Track Speed Skating Championships and Winter Olympic Games) may also participate if time does not conflict.

== Seasons ==
- 2013–2014 Chinese Short Track Speed Skating League
- 2014–2015 Chinese Short Track Speed Skating League
