= Jakub Jaworski =

Polish speed skater

Personal information
- Born: 29 July 1986 (age 39) Białystok, Poland
- Height: 5 ft 10 in (178 cm)
- Weight: 152 lb (69 kg)

Sport
- Country: Poland
- Sport: Short track speed skating

Achievements and titles
- Highest world ranking: 43rd (1000m)

Jakub Jaworski (born 29 July 1986) is a Polish short-track speed-skater.

Jaworski competed at the 2010 Winter Olympics for Poland. In the 1500 metres, he finished fourth in his first round heat, failing to advance. placing 27th overall.

As of 2013, Jaworski's best performance at the World Championships came in 2012, when he placed 19th in the 1500 metres.

As of 2013, Jaworski has not finished on the podium on the ISU Short Track Speed Skating World Cup. His top World Cup ranking is 43rd, in the 1000 metres in 2007-08.
