= Liu Songbo =

Chinese speed skater

Personal information
- Born: April 1, 1993 (age 33) Changchun, Jilin, China

Sport
- Country: China
- Sport: Short track speed skating

Achievements and titles
- Personal best(s): 500m: 41.664 (2011); 1000m: 1:27.891 (2011); 1500m: 2:18.384 (2011)
Medal record
Men's short track speed skating
Representing China
World Junior Championships
Gold medal – first place	2011 Courmayeur	500 m
Winter Universiade
Gold medal – first place	2011 Erzurum	5000 m relay

Liu Songbo (Chinese: 刘松博; born 1 April 1993 in Jilin) is a Chinese male short track speed skater. Representing China, he participated in both 2009 and 2010 World Junior Short Track Speed Skating Championships, and ranked 15th and 4th respectively (overall ranking). He won the gold medal for 500 meters in 2011 World Junior Championships, as well as a gold medal in 2011 Winter Universiade for men's 5000 meter relay race.
