= Chinese Skating Association =

Governing body of ice skating in China

- Sport: figure skating
- Jurisdiction: China
- Abbreviation: CSA
- Founded: 1956
- Affiliation: International Skating Union
- Headquarters: Beijing

Official website
- www.chinacsa.net.cn
- (China)

The Chinese Skating Association (CSA) (simplified Chinese: 中国滑冰协会; traditional Chinese: 中國滑冰協會; pinyin: Zhōngguó Huábīng Xiéhuì) was founded in 1956. It was the second Asian country to join the International Skating Union (ISU).

It hosts international and manages domestic short track speed skating and speed skating competitions. Meanwhile, the Chinese Figure Skating Association (CFSA) (simplified Chinese: 中国花样滑冰协会; traditional Chinese: 中國花式滑冰協會; pinyin: Zhōngguó Huāyàng Huábīng Xiéhuì), formed in 2018, hosts the Cup of China and manages a series of domestic competitions including the annual Chinese Figure Skating Championships.

Chinese Skating Association
- Traditional Chinese: 中國滑冰協會
- Simplified Chinese: 中国滑冰协会
Transcriptions
Standard Mandarin
- Hanyu Pinyin: Zhōngguó Huábīng Xiéhuì

== Events Hosted by the CSA ==
=== Figure skating (hosted by the CFSA) ===
==== Domestic events ====
- Chinese Figure Skating Inter-club League & Inter-club League final
- National Grand Prix Figure Skating Competition
- Chinese Figure Skating Championships
- Chinese Junior Figure Skating Championships
- Chinese Novice Figure Skating Championships
- Chinese Synchronized Skating Championships
- Chinese National Figure skating champion competition

==== International events ====
- Shanghai Trophy
- Cup of China

=== Short track speed skating (hosted by the CSA) ===
==== Domestic events ====
- Chinese Short Track Speed Skating Interschool League for Primary and Secondary Schools
- Chinese Cup of China Short Track Speed Skating Elite League
- Chinese Short track speed skating Championships
- Chinese Junior Short track speed skating Championships
- Chinese Short Track Speed Skating champion competition
- Chinese Short Track Speed Skating League

==== International events ====
- Shanghai Trophy
- One leg at the ISU Short Track Speed Skating World Cup

=== Speed skating (hosted by the CSA) ===
==== Domestic events ====
- Chinese Speed Skating Interschool League for Primary and Secondary Schools
- Chinese Cup of China Speed Skating Elite League
- Chinese Speed Skating Outdoor series
- Chinese Speed skating Championships
- Chinese Junior speed skating Championships

==== International events ====
- One leg at the ISU Speed Skating World Cup

== Notable people in Chinese figure skating ==
- Yao Bin & Luan Bo Pairs team now coaches - first Chinese pair skaters at a Winter Olympics
- Chen Lu - singles skater - first Chinese world champion figure skater
- Guo Zhengxin - singles skater - first man to land two quads in a free skate
- Zhang Min - singles skater
- Li Chenjiang - singles skater
- Shen Xue & Zhao Hongbo - First Chinese skaters to win Olympic Gold
