= Hwang Hyun-sun =

South Korean speed skater

Personal information
- Born: March 24, 1993 (age 33)

Sport
- Sport: Short track speed skating
Medal record
Representing South Korea
Women's short track speed skating
World Team Championships
| Gold medal – first place | 2011 Warsaw | Team |
Asian Winter Games
| Silver medal – second place | 2011 Astana-Almaty | 3000 m relay |
Winter Universiade
| Gold medal – first place | 2013 Trentino | 3000 m relay |
| Gold medal – first place | 2017 Almaty | 3000 m relay |
| Silver medal – second place | 2013 Trentino | 1500 m |
World Junior Championships
| Gold medal – first place | 2012 Melbourne | Super 1500 m |
| Gold medal – first place | 2012 Melbourne | 3000 m Relay |
| Silver medal – second place | 2012 Melbourne | Overall |
| Silver medal – second place | 2012 Melbourne | 1000 m |
| Silver medal – second place | 2012 Melbourne | 1500 m |
Women's speed skating
Four Continents Championships
| Bronze medal – third place | 2023 Quebec | Team pursuit |

Hwang Hyun-sun (Korean: 황현선; Hanja: 黃鉉善, born March 24, 1993) is a short track speed skater who competes for South Korea.

== Career ==
In 2010, Kim was chosen by the South Korea national team at the age of 17. She won one gold, five silvers and one bronze medals at the World Cup. At the 2011 Asian Winter Games, she also won silver in 3000 m relay. She also won a gold medal at the 2011 World Team Championships in Warsaw.
