= Gong Qiuwen =

Chinese short track speed skater

Personal information
- Born: June 13, 1993 (age 33) Mudanjiang, Heilongjiang, China

Sport
- Country: China
- Sport: Short track speed skating
- Coached by: Li Yan

Achievements and titles
- Personal best(s): 500m: 41.339 (2011); 1000m: 1:24.174 (2012); 1500m: 2:18.392 (2012)
Medal record
Men's short track speed skating
Representing China
World Team Championships
| Silver medal – second place | 2011 Warsaw | Team |
World Junior Championships
| Silver medal – second place | 2009 Sherbrooke | Relay |

Gong Qiuwen (born June 13, 1993, in Mudanjiang, Heilongjiang) is a Chinese former male short track speed skater. He competed in the 2011–12 World Cup, finishing twince in top-3, and at the 2012 World Championships, finishing 4th in 500 m race. He was also named to the Chinese team at the 2011 Asian Winter Games.
