= Zhang Qichao =

Chinese speed skater

Zhang Qichao (born February 22, 1992) is a Chinese short track speed skater. She won one distance and became third overall at the 2008 World Junior Championships in Bolzano.

== Career highlights ==
ISU World Junior Short Track Speed Skating Championships
2008 - Bolzano, (bronze) 3rd overall classification

1st at 500 m
