= World Junior Short Track Speed Skating Championships =

Annual youth speed skating competition

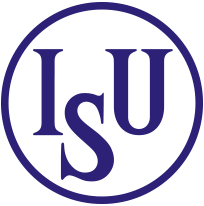
- Status: active
- Genre: sporting event
- Date: varying
- Frequency: annual
- Country: varying
- Inaugurated: 1994

The World Junior Short Track Speed Skating Championships are a junior short track speed skating event and held once a year in a different country. Skaters perform individual races in the 500 meters, 1000 meters, 1500 meters, 1500 meters super final and a team effort in the 3000 meters relay.

== Editions ==
Edition	Year	Host	Events
1	1994	(South Korea) Seoul	8
2	1995	(Canada) Calgary	8
3	1996	(Italy) Courmayeur	11
4	1997	(United States) Marquette	10
5	1998	(United States) St. Louis	10
6	1999	(Canada) Montreal	10
7	2000	(Hungary) Székesfehérvár	10
8	2001	(Poland) Warsaw	12
9	2002	(South Korea) Chuncheon	12
10	2003	(Hungary) Budapest	12
11	2004	(China) Beijing	12
12	2005	(Serbia and Montenegro) Belgrade	12
13	2006	(Romania) Miercurea Ciuc	12
14	2007	(Czech Republic) Mladá Boleslav	12
15	2008	(Italy) Bolzano	12
16	2009	(Canada) Sherbrooke	12
17	2010	(Taiwan) Taipei	12
18	2011	(Italy) Courmayeur	12
19	2012	(Australia) Melbourne	12
20	2013	(Poland) Warsaw	12
21	2014	(Turkey) Erzurum	12
22	2015	(Japan) Osaka	12
23	2016	(Bulgaria) Sofia	12
24	2017	(Austria) Innsbruck	12
25	2018	(Poland) Tomaszów Mazowiecki	12
26	2019	(Canada) Montreal	8
27	2020	(Italy) Bormio	8
28	2022	(Poland) Gdańsk	8
29	2023	(Germany) Dresden	8
30	2024	(Poland) Gdańsk	9
31	2025	(Canada) Calgary	9
32	2026	(United States) Salt Lake City	9

- 2021 Edition in Salt Lake City was cancelled.

== Medalists – boys (overall) ==
Year	Location	Gold	Silver	Bronze
1994	(South Korea) Seoul	(South Korea) Lee Seung-chan	(South Korea) Lee Jun-hwan	(United States) Tony Goskowicz
1995	(Canada) Calgary	(South Korea) Lee Sang-jun	(Canada) Patrice Lapointe (South Korea) Lee Seung-chan (Canada) Jonathan Guilmette	none
1996	(Italy) Courmayeur	(Canada) Jean-François Monette (South Korea) Lee Sang-jun	none	(Japan) Naoya Tamura
1997	(United States) Marquette	(South Korea) Kim Dong-sung	(United States) Rusty Smith	(United States) Daniel Weinstein
1998	(United States) St. Louis	(Canada) François-Louis Tremblay (South Korea) Lee Seung-jae	none	(Canada) Andrew Lahey
1999	(Canada) Montreal	(United States) Apolo Anton Ohno	(South Korea) An Jung-hyun	(Canada) François-Louis Tremblay
2000	(Hungary) Székesfehérvár	(South Korea) Min Ryoung	(Italy) Nicola Rodigari	(Canada) Andrew Lahey
2001	(Poland) Warsaw	(South Korea) Lee Seung-jae	(China) Guo Wei	(South Korea) Min Ryoung
2002	(South Korea) Chuncheon	(South Korea) Ahn Hyun-soo	(South Korea) Seo Ho-jin	(China) Guo Wei
2003	(Hungary) Budapest	(South Korea) Lee Ho-suk	(South Korea) Kim Hyun-kon	(South Korea) Sung Si-bak
2004	(China) Beijing	(South Korea) Lee Ho-suk	(South Korea) Kwon Ki-deok	(United Kingdom) Jon Eley
2005	(Serbia and Montenegro) Belgrade	(South Korea) Lee Ho-suk	(South Korea) Kim Hyun-kon	(South Korea) Kwak Yoon-gy
2006	(Romania) Miercurea Ciuc	(South Korea) Lee Jung-su	(France) Maxime Chataignier	(South Korea) Kim Jae-han
2007	(Czech Republic) Mladá Boleslav	(South Korea) Shin Woo-chul	(South Korea) Lee Jung-su	(South Korea) Jang Won-hoon
2008	(Italy) Bolzano	(South Korea) Kim Yun-jae	(South Korea) Lee Jung-su	(South Korea) Lee Han-bin
2009	(Canada) Sherbrooke	(South Korea) Um Cheon-ho	(South Korea) You Dong-kun	(United States) J. R. Celski
2010	(Taiwan) Taipei	(South Korea) Noh Jin-kyu	(Canada) Antoine Gélinas-Beaulieu	(South Korea) Park Se-yeong
2011	(Italy) Courmayeur	(South Korea) Seo Yi-ra	(United Kingdom) Jack Whelbourne	(China) Wu Dajing
2012	(Australia) Melbourne	(South Korea) Park Se-yeong	(South Korea) Lee Hyo-been	(China) Han Tianyu
2013	(Poland) Warsaw	(South Korea) Park Se-yeong	(China) Han Tianyu	(South Korea) Lee Hyo-been
2014	(Turkey) Erzurum	(South Korea) Lee Mun-hyeon	(South Korea) Lee Hyo-been	(Hungary) Sándor Liu Shaolin
2015	(Japan) Osaka	(South Korea) Kim Da-gyeom	(South Korea) Park Ji-won	(Hungary) Sándor Liu Shaolin
2016	(Bulgaria) Sofia	(China) Ren Ziwei	(South Korea) Lim Yong-jin	(China) Ma Wei
2017	(Austria) Innsbruck	(Hungary) Shaoang Liu	(South Korea) Kim Si-Un	(Japan) Kazuki Yoshinaga
2018	(Poland) Tomaszow Mazowiecki	(South Korea) Hong Kyung-hwan	(South Korea) Lee June-seo	(South Korea) Park Jang-hyuk

== Medalists – girls (overall) ==
Year	Location	Gold	Silver	Bronze
1994	(South Korea) Seoul	(South Korea) Kim So-hee	(South Korea) Won Hye-kyung	(China) Su Xiaohua
1995	(Canada) Calgary	(South Korea) Kim Yun-mi	(South Korea) Won Hye-kyung	(Canada) Catherine Dussault (Japan) Ikue Teshigawara
1996	(Italy) Courmayeur	(Japan) Ikue Teshigawara	(United States) Erin Porter	(South Korea) Kim Moon-jung (South Korea) Hong Ro-sa
1997	(United States) Marquette	(South Korea) Won Hye-kyung (South Korea) An Sang-mi	none	(United States) Julie Goskowicz
1998	(United States) St. Louis	(South Korea) Joo Min-jin	(South Korea) Kim Moon-jung	(Bulgaria) Kristina Vuteva
1999	(Canada) Montreal	(South Korea) Joo Min-jin	(South Korea) Kim Moon-jung	(Italy) Marta Capurso
2000	(Hungary) Székesfehérvár	(Canada) Marie-Ève Drolet	(South Korea) Choi Min-kyung	(South Korea) Park Hye-rim
2001	(Poland) Warsaw	(Canada) Marie-Ève Drolet	(South Korea) Ko Gi-hyun	(South Korea) Choi Min-kyung
2002	(South Korea) Chuncheon	(South Korea) Kim Min-jee	(China) Wang Meng	(South Korea) Cho Ha-ri
2003	(Hungary) Budapest	(South Korea) Byun Chun-sa	(South Korea) Kang Yun-mi	(South Korea) Kim Min-jee
2004	(China) Beijing	(South Korea) Kang Yun-mi	(South Korea) Jung Eun-ju	(South Korea) Hur Hee-been
2005	(Serbia and Montenegro) Belgrade	(South Korea) Park Sun-young	(South Korea) Jeon Ji-soo	(Canada) Kalyna Roberge
2006	(Romania) Miercurea Ciuc	(South Korea) Jung Eun-ju	(South Korea) Choi Jung-won	(China) Zhou Yang
2007	(Czech Republic) Mladá Boleslav	(South Korea) Yang Shin-young	(South Korea) Shin Sae-bom	(South Korea) Park Seung-hi
2008	(Italy) Bolzano	(South Korea) Noh Ah-reum	(South Korea) Lee Eun-byul	(China) Zhang Qichao
2009	(Canada) Sherbrooke	(South Korea) Noh Ah-reum	(South Korea) Lee Eun-byul	(South Korea) Lee Mi-yeon
2010	(Taiwan) Taipei	(South Korea) Choi Ji-hyun	(South Korea) Lee Mi-yeon	(South Korea) Song Jae-won
2011	(Italy) Courmayeur	(South Korea) Cheon Hee-jung	(South Korea) Ahn Se-jung	(Italy) Martina Valcepina
2012	(Australia) Melbourne	(South Korea) Shim Suk-hee	(South Korea) Hwang Hyun-sun	(South Korea) Ahn Se-jung
2013	(Poland) Warsaw	(South Korea) Noh Do-hee	(South Korea) Kim A-lang	(China) Han Yutong
2014	(Turkey) Erzurum	(South Korea) Noh Do-hee	(South Korea) Ahn Se-jung	(South Korea) Choi Min-jeong
2015	(Japan) Osaka	(South Korea) Kong Sang-jeong	(South Korea) Kim Ji-yoo	(South Korea) Son Ha-kyung
2016	(Bulgaria) Sofia	(China) Qu Chunyu	(Netherlands) Suzanne Schulting	(South Korea) Lee Yu-bin
2017	(Austria) Innsbruck	(South Korea) Lee Yu-bin	(South Korea) Seo Whi-min	(Russia) Sofia Prosvirnova
2018	(Poland) Tomaszow Mazowiecki	(South Korea) Kim Ji-yoo	(Canada) Courtney Lee Sarault	(United States) Maame Biney

== Medals (2010–2024) ==
Rank	Nation	Gold	Silver	Bronze	Total
1	South Korea	98	64	43	205
2	China	22	24	31	77
3	Canada	7	20	10	37
4	Hungary	7	8	10	25
5	Netherlands	5	6	7	18
6	Italy	3	2	6	11
7	United States	2	5	8	15
8	Russia	1	10	11	22
9	Japan	1	5	13	19
10	Great Britain	1	3	1	5
11	France	1	0	2	3
11	Poland	1	0	2	3
13	Kazakhstan	0	1	2	3
14	Lithuania	0	1	0	1
15	Australia	0	0	2	2
Totals (15 entries)		149	149	148	446

- No bronze medal was awarded in the men's 500 metre event in 2011 Edition, because the other two skaters were disqualified.

== See also ==
- Short track speed skating
- World Short Track Speed Skating Championships
- World Short Track Speed Skating Team Championships
